= List of Chicago Fire FC seasons =

This is a list of seasons played by Chicago Fire FC in North American soccer competitions from 1998, when the club was formed, to the most recent completed season. It details the club's achievements in all major competitive competitions.

== Key ==
Key to competitions

- Major League Soccer (MLS) – The top-flight of soccer in the United States, established in 1996.
- U.S. Open Cup (USOC) – The premier knockout cup competition in U.S. soccer, first contested in 1914.
- CONCACAF Champions League (CCL) – The premier competition in North American soccer since 1962. It went by the name of Champions' Cup until 2008.

Key to colors and symbols

1st or W	Winners
2nd or RU	Runners-up
3rd	Third place
Last	Wooden Spoon
♦	MLS Golden Boot
	Highest average attendance
Italics	Ongoing competition

Key to league record

- Season = The year and article of the season
- Div = Division/level on pyramid
- League = League name
- Pld = Games played
- W = Games won
- L = Games lost
- D = Games drawn
- GF = Goals for
- GA = Goals against
- GD = Goal difference
- Pts = Points
- PPG = Points per game
- Conf. = Conference position
- Overall = League position

Key to cup record

- DNE = Did not enter
- DNQ = Did not qualify
- NH = Competition not held or canceled
- QR = Qualifying round
- PR = Preliminary round
- GS = Group stage
- R1 = First round
- R2 = Second round
- R3 = Third round
- R4 = Fourth round
- R5 = Fifth round
- Ro16 = Round of 16
- QF = Quarterfinals
- SF = Semifinals
- F = Final
- RU = Runners-up
- W = Winners

== Seasons ==
Season	League										Position		Playoffs	USOC	Continental / Other		Average attendance (Note: Average attendance only includes statistics from regular season matches.)	Top goalscorer(s) (Note: Top goalscorer(s) includes all goals scored in the regular season, MLS Cup Playoffs, U.S. Open Cup, MLS is Back Tournament, CONCACAF Champions League, FIFA Club World Cup, and other competitive continental matches.)	
Season	League	Pld	W	L	D	GF	GA	GD	Pts	PPG	Conf.	Overall	Playoffs	USOC	Continental / Other		Average attendance	Name(s)	Goals
1998	MLS	32	20	12	0	62	45	+17	56	1.75	2nd	3rd	W	W	DNE		17,886	(United States) Ante Razov	11
1999	MLS	32	18	14	0	51	36	+15	48	1.50	3rd	4th	QF	Ro16	CONCACAF Champions Cup	3rd	16,016	(United States) Ante Razov	16
2000	MLS	32	17	9	6	67	51	+16	57	1.78	1st	2nd	RU	W	DNQ		13,387	(United States) Ante Razov	22
2001	MLS	27	16	6	5	50	30	+20	53	1.96	1st	2nd	SF	SF	DNQ		16,388	(United States) Eric Wynalda	11
2002	MLS	28	11	13	4	43	38	+5	37	1.32	3rd	7th	QF	Ro16	CONCACAF Champions Cup	QF	12,922	(United States) Ante Razov	16
2003	MLS	30	15	7	8	53	43	+10	53	1.77	1st	1st	RU	W	DNQ		14,005	(United States) Ante Razov	16
2004	MLS	30	8	13	9	36	44	−8	33	1.10	5th	10th	DNQ	RU	CONCACAF Champions Cup	SF	17,153	(Jamaica) Damani Ralph	13
2005	MLS	32	15	13	4	49	50	−1	49	1.53	3rd	4th	SF	SF	DNQ		17,238	(United States) Chris Rolfe	8
2006	MLS	32	13	11	8	43	41	+2	47	1.47	3rd	4th	QF	W	DNQ		14,111	(Costa Rica) Andy Herron	13
2007	MLS	30	10	10	10	31	36	−5	40	1.33	4th	7th	SF	Ro16	DNQ		16,490	(United States) Chad Barrett	8
2008	MLS	30	13	10	7	44	33	+11	46	1.53	2nd	3rd	SF	QF	DNQ		17,034	(United States) Chris Rolfe	10
2009	MLS	30	11	7	12	39	34	+5	45	1.50	2nd	5th	SF	Ro16	North American SuperLiga	RU	15,487	(United States) Brian McBride	7
2010	MLS	30	9	12	9	37	38	−1	36	1.20	4th	10th	DNQ	Ro16	North American SuperLiga	GS	15,814	(Guatemala) Marco Pappa	7
2011	MLS	34	9	9	16	46	45	+1	43	1.26	6th	11th	DNQ	RU	DNQ		14,274	(Ghana) Dominic Oduro	14
2012	MLS	34	17	11	6	46	41	+5	57	1.68	4th	6th	R1	R3	DNQ		16,409	(United States) Chris Rolfe	8
2013	MLS	34	14	13	7	47	52	−5	49	1.44	6th	12th	DNQ	SF	DNQ		15,228	(United States) Mike Magee	18
2014	MLS	34	6	10	18	41	51	−10	36	1.06	9th	15th	DNQ	SF	DNQ		16,076	(United States) Quincy Amarikwa	10
2015	MLS	34	8	20	6	43	58	−15	30	0.88	10th	20th	DNQ	SF	DNQ		16,003	(Ghana) David Accam	10
2016	MLS	34	7	17	10	42	58	−16	31	0.91	10th	20th	DNQ	SF	DNQ		15,602	(Ghana) David Accam	14
2017	MLS	34	16	11	7	62	48	+14	55	1.67	3rd	3rd	R1	Ro16	DNQ		17,383	(Hungary) Nemanja Nikolić	24♦ (Note: Nikolić won the MLS Golden Boot (24 goals))
2018	MLS	34	8	18	8	48	61	−13	32	0.94	10th	20th	DNQ	SF	DNQ		14,806	(Hungary) Nemanja Nikolić	19
2019	MLS	34	10	12	12	55	47	+8	42	1.24	8th	17th	DNQ	R4	Leagues Cup	QF	12,324	(Hungary) Nemanja Nikolić	13
2020	MLS	23	5	10	8	33	39	−6	23	1.00	11th	22nd	DNQ	NH	MLS is Back Tournament	GS	0 (Note: Due to the COVID-19 pandemic, games were played behind closed doors.)	(Slovenia) Robert Berić	12
2021	MLS	34	9	18	7	36	54	−18	34	1.00	12th	22nd	DNQ	NH	DNQ		10,703	(Slovenia) Robert Berić	8
2022	MLS	34	10	15	9	39	48	−9	39	1.15	12th	24th	DNQ	R3	DNQ		15,848	(Colombia) Jhon Durán	8
2023	MLS	34	10	14	10	39	51	−12	40	1.18	13th	24th	DNQ	QF	Leagues Cup	R32	18,170	(Switzerland) Maren Haile-Selassie (Switzerland) Xherdan Shaqiri	7
2024	MLS	34	7	18	9	40	62	−22	30	0.88	15th	28th	DNQ	DNE	Leagues Cup	GS	21,327	(Belgium) Hugo Cuypers	10
2025	MLS	34	15	11	8	68	60	+8	53	1.56	9th	13th	R1	QF	DNE		23,479	(Belgium) Hugo Cuypers	17
Total	–	894	327	344	226	1283	1307	-24	1194	1.34	–	–	–	–	—		–	(United States) Ante Razov	110
