= Section 8 Chicago =

- Section 8 Chicago logo
- Nickname: Section 8
- Abbreviation: S8
- Established: 1999 (section); 2003 (association)
- Type: Supporters' association
- Team: Chicago Fire
- Location: Chicago, Illinois, U.S.
- Stadium: Toyota Park (formerly); Benedetti-Wehrli Stadium (formerly); Soldier Field
- Colors: Red, white
- Website: www.s8c.org

Section 8 Chicago is the independent supporters' association for the Chicago Fire. The organization encompasses a number of affiliated supporters groups, as well as independent fans. The vision of the ISA is "to unite all Chicago Fire fans, to create a dominant in-stadium force unseen in American sports, and to establish home-field advantage whenever the Fire play".

Most groups associated with Section 8 Chicago occupy an area in the stadium known as "Section 8" – named after its original location at Soldier Field. With the Fire now playing at the renovated Soldier Field, "Section 8" consists of sections 121 to 124 in the South End of the stadium.

Reports describe Section 8 supporters' chanting during matches and use of visual displays.

As an independent association for supporters, Section 8 Chicago exists to coordinate fan initiatives, assist supporters groups, donate to local charities, and act as the fanbase's primary liaison to the Chicago Fire organization. The ISA board of directors is elected annually in January at a meeting open to all Fire fans.

== The History of "Section 8" ==
Fire supporter culture began in 1997 with the establishment of Barn Burners 1871 and the selection of the seating area in the Fire's stadium beginning the following year. As much for the symbolism of the name as the location on the corner of the field, Section 8 was chosen as the fans' home sector and established a designated standing area there ( with then-GM Peter Wilt) to encourage the style of fandom seen both in other countries' soccer traditions or in American college athletics. From the 1999 season, the Fire Ultras 98 moved to Section 8 from their location on the opposite side of the stadium. The primarily American/English influence of the Barn Burners became fused with the European ultras style of the Polish group. The resultant cocktail was a success, and both groups agreed to permanent cohabitation in the section. This set the precedent for cooperative organization among Fire fans still held today.

Growth continued despite an adversarial relationship with stadium security personnel. During the following period of the Fire's greatest playing success in 2000 and 2001, the uniquely chaotic style attracted more independents with the supporters' end swelling past 1000 persons at important matches.

In 2002, renovations of Soldier Field forced the Fire to temporarily relocate to the suburb of Naperville, playing at Cardinal Stadium. Its location on a small college campus, some newly restrictive policies on fans, and poor performance by the club all stifled growth for a period. However, the move introduced behind-the-goal seating to Section 8, with the entire north stand of the small facility designated as a supporters' area. The close proximity of the supporters' area to the rest of the crowd fostered a heightened interaction and participation stadium-wide compared to previous years at Soldier Field, where fans were more dispersed.

The club returned to the renovated Soldier Field in 2003, and the stands behind the south goal housed Section 8. The team's improved performance and an increase in fan numbers helped lead to a new movement of creating large banners along the walls surrounding the field, marking territory throughout the stadium. Choreographed pre-match visual displays (tifo)) using a variety of materials became de rigueur for important matches in the manner of large European soccer clubs. In 2005, after Fire ownership's unexpected and sudden dismissal of popular club president Peter Wilt, fans coordinated a large protest at that season's home opener; entering en masse and dressed in black eight minutes after kickoff, in a show of solidarity with the ex-president.

In 2006, the construction of Toyota Park gave the club a permanent home. The move to the corner of 71st Street and Harlem Avenue saw Section 8 take residence in sections 117 and 118 on the stadium's north side, also known as the "Harlem End" . The combined resources of fan groups and the Section 8 Chicago organization made several large fan-led projects possible in the stadium's inaugural year. Amongst them were the commissioning of a handmade wooden sign for the player tunnel leading to the field, and funding an engraved brick testimonial at the stadium's entrance commemorating former president Peter Wilt's role in making the facility happen. Most spectacularly, fans combined to create one of the largest fan-produced flags in professional sports - the 80 yard by 25 yard Megabandera. The flag covered the entire "Harlem End" of the stadium, and was displayed just prior to kickoff at the Fire's most important home games.

Due to continued growth and an improved season ticket base, Section 8 has expanded to encompass four sections (116, 117, 118, and 119) since the 2011 season.

== Supporters' Player of the Year ==
ISA started the Supporters' Player of the Year award in 2009. At the end of the season supporters vote via the ISA's website for their player of the year. There are no criteria for which the player is judged on. The player is given a plaque and has their name engraved on a plaque that is displayed publicly. Section 8 Chicago makes a donation to a charity of the player's choice.

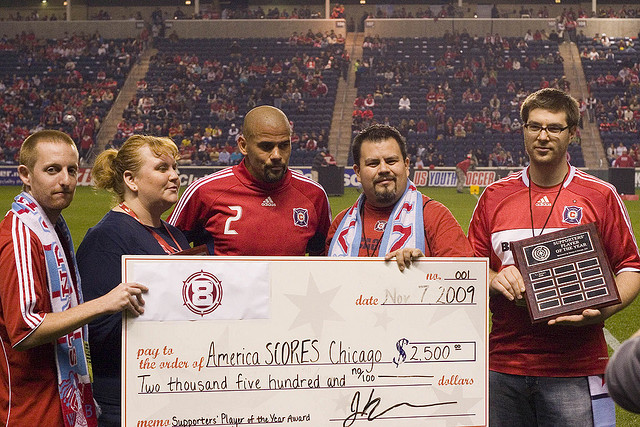
ISA leadership presenting the inaugural award to Brown in 2009.

=== List of Recipients ===
Year	Player	Charity	Amount
2009	CJ Brown	America Scores Chicago	$2,500
2010	CJ Brown	Chicago Fire Foundation	$2,000
2011	Dominic Oduro	Nothing But Nets	$1,000
2012	Patrick Nyarko	A Better Life For Kids	$1,500
2013	Mike Magee	Meals on Wheels Chicago	$1,500
2014	Lovel Palmer	Harbour View FC	$1,000

== Main Supporter Groups ==
Information and background of the main affiliated supporter groups:

"Section 8", the supporters area at Toyota Park

=== Barn Burners 1871 ===
Established in spring 1997 by Don Crafts, before the founding of the Chicago Fire Soccer Club. This group was the first to organize, and were the original occupants of Section 8 at Soldier Field in the first season. Numbering in the hundreds, BB1871 are the dominant fan group in coordinating supporter activities. They are known for establishing the tailgate parties as the standard prematch activity for Fire fans.

=== Fire Ultras 98 ===
Fire Ultras 98 Large Logo

The most notorious of supporters’ groups, Fire Ultras 98 is a group of Polish fans, both recent immigrants and transplanted natives, dedicated to supporting the Chicago Fire Soccer Club in the traditional “ultras” style common in their home country and across Europe.

Established in 1998, FU98 members known for their harder edge in support of the Fire at home and away; identifiable by their orange jackets, scarfs and fervent vocal and visual support. Originally residing in Section 9 at Soldier Field in 1998, they merged into Section 8 for the 1999 season. This group is responsible for the original visual style of Fire fans: wearing of scarves, displaying large banners, and waving flags.

=== Ultras Red-Side ===
Inspired by the Fire Ultras 98, Ultras Red-Side was established in 2003 to encourage more fans to support in an ultras manner. Whereas FU98 were led by central European methods, URS are heavily influenced by those in Spain, France, Italy, and Scandinavia. This group formally introduced the concept of organised visual displays, or tifo, to Fire fan culture. After several years of informal organization, the group began an annual dues-paying membership structure in 2007.

=== Other Groups ===
- Arsonists were established in 1998, sitting in Section 16 near the center line of old Soldier Field.
- Mike Ditka Street Crew became a Fire fan group in 2002, claiming a punk/skin/mod influence not unlike the fans of St. Pauli in Germany.
- Whiskey Brothers Aught Five (WB05) became a group in 2005, originally a younger group of hipsters primarily based around drinking culture.
- Sector Latino are a barra style group of Latin American fans.
- Acme Irregulars are a group of Central Illinois Transplants, who are now affiliated with Ultras Red-Side.
- Husaria became a group in 2008, and are composed of both original members of Fire Ultras 98, and younger Polish Fire supporters.
- Black Fires established in 2018
- Red Line
- Arson City Ultras punk influenced fans who support local music as much as their local team.
- Fanbulance
- Red Love
- Banter Buddies

== 2026 ISA Board of Directors ==
(position, name, group affiliation)

- Chairperson: John (Red Line)
- Vice-Chairperson: Raul (Fanbulance)
- Dir., Communications: Gary (Independent)
- Dir., Finances: Carri (Independent)
- Dir., Events/Operations: Collin & Terry (Barn Burners 1871)
- Dir., Marketing: Sean (Whiskey Brothers)
- Dir., Fundraising: Nick (Black Fires)

== Previous Chair ==
- Maurico Pineda (Barn Burners 1871) (2025)
- Nick Mann (Black Fires) (2021-2024)
- Jake Campbell (Red Line) (2020)
- Nicole Hack (Independent) (2019)
- Dan Giroux (Logan's Squares) (2018)
- Scott Greene (WB05) (2016-2017)
- Dan Martin (WB05) (2015)
- Pattrick Stanton (WB05) (2014)
- Jeff Marinacci (WB05) (2014)
- Joel Piktel (Independent) (2012-2013)
- Thomas Dunmore (WB05) (2010-2011)
- Benjamin Burton (Independent) (2007–2009)
- Marcin Tłustochowicz (Fire Ultras 98) (2005–2006)

== Section 8 Chicago Affiliate Supporters Groups ==
(in order of founding date; approx. size listed)

- Barn Burners 1871 (1997; 300+)
- Fire Ultras 98 (1998; 20+)
- Ultras Red-Side (2003; 20+)
- Whiskey Brothers Aught Five (2005; 20+)
- Sector Latino (2005; 50+)
- Brew City Firm Milwaukee (2006; 20+)
- Red Love (2010; 10)
- Fanbulance (2010; 10)
- Westmont Ultras (2011; 24)
- Banda Roja (2012; 20+)
- Logan's Squares (2015; 1+)
- Arson City Ultras (2016; 15+)
- Red Line (2018; 8+)

NB: The majority of "Section 8" fans are independent and unaffiliated with a supporter group.

== Related Websites ==
- Section 8 Chicago Independent Supporters' Association Web Site
- Barn Burners 1871 Supporters' Group still active archived website
- Barn Burners 1871 Supporters' Group current website
- Fire Ultras 98 Supporters' Group website
- Ultras Red-Side Supporters' Group website
- Blitzer Mob Supporters' Group website
- YouTube video of Section 8 photos
- 2006 Chicago Tribune article on Section 8
