= 2009 Chicago Fire season =

Chicago Fire
2009 season
- Chairman: Andrew Hauptman
- Manager: Denis Hamlett
- MLS: 5th overall (2nd in Eastern Conference)
- MLS Cup Playoffs: Conference Final
- U.S. Open Cup: Round of 16
- Superliga: Runners-up
- Brimstone Cup: No winner determined
- Top goalscorer: Brian McBride (7)
- Average home league attendance: 15,071
- Biggest win: DAL 1-3 CHI (3/21)
- Biggest defeat: CHI 0-3 DAL (5/31)
Home colors	Away colors

The 2009 Chicago Fire season was the club's 11th year of existence, as well as their 12th season in Major League Soccer and 12th consecutive year in the top-flight of American soccer. It began with a 3–1 away win over FC Dallas on March 21, 2009, and ended with a loss on penalties to Real Salt Lake in the Eastern Conference Final on November 14, 2009.

As of 2025, this is the most recent appearance for the Fire in the conference finals and was the last time the club won a playoff game until 2025.

== Roster ==
=== Squad ===
As of July 17, 2009. Note: Flags indicate national team as defined under FIFA eligibility rules; some limited exceptions apply. Players may hold more than one non-FIFA nationality.

No.	Pos.	Nation	Player
1	GK	USA	Jon Busch
2	DF	USA	C. J. Brown (Captain)
3	FW	USA	Calen Carr
4	DF	MLI	Bakary Soumaré
5	DF	USA	Tim Ward
6	DF	USA	Brandon Prideaux
7	MF	USA	Logan Pause
9	MF	BIH	Baggio Husidić
10	MF	MEX	Cuauhtémoc Blanco
11	MF	USA	John Thorrington
14	FW	GHA	Patrick Nyarko
16	MF	GUA	Marco Pappa

No.	Pos.	Nation	Player
17	FW	USA	Chris Rolfe
18	MF	USA	Mike Banner
20	FW	USA	Brian McBride
21	MF	USA	Justin Mapp
22	DF	COL	Wilman Conde
23	FW	BUL	Stefan Dimitrov
24	DF	USA	Daniel Woolard
25	DF	CRC	Gonzalo Segares
29	MF	USA	Peter Lowry
32	DF	USA	Dasan Robinson
34	DF	USA	Austin Washington
40	GK	USA	Andrew Dykstra

=== Transfers ===
==== In ====
Note: Flags indicate national team as defined under FIFA eligibility rules; some limited exceptions apply. Players may hold more than one non-FIFA nationality.

No.	Pos.	Nation	Player
9	MF	BIH	Baggio Husidić (from Draft, 20th Overall)
5	DF	USA	Tim Ward (off waivers)

No.	Pos.	Nation	Player
40	GK	USA	Andrew Dykstra (unattached)

==== Out ====
Note: Flags indicate national team as defined under FIFA eligibility rules; some limited exceptions apply. Players may hold more than one non-FIFA nationality.

No.	Pos.	Nation	Player
8	MF	USA	Diego Gutiérrez (Retired)
33	MF	USA	Stephen King (to Seattle Sounders FC, 2009 Expansion Draft)
9	FW	POL	Tomasz Frankowski (Released on waivers)

No.	Pos.	Nation	Player
26	FW	CRC	Andy Herron (Released on waivers)
28	GK	USA	Nick Noble (Released on waivers)
4	DF	MLI	Bakary Soumaré (Mid season transfer to Boulogne)

== Club ==
=== Management ===
Position	Staff
Technical Director	(United States) Frank Klopas
Manager	(Costa Rica) Denis Hamlett
Assistant manager	(United States) Mike Jeffries
Assistant manager	(United States) Mike Matkovich
Assistant manager	(United States) Daryl Shore
Head athletic trainer	(United States) Paul Ziemba
Assistant athletic trainer	(United States) Bo Leonard
Equipment manager	(United States) Charles Raycroft

Last updated: April 18, 2009
Source: Chicago Fire

=== Other information ===
Chairman	(United States) Andrew Hauptman
Ground (capacity and dimensions)	Toyota Park (20,000 / N/A)

Source: Chicago Fire

== Competitions ==
=== Overall ===
Competition	Started round	Current position / round	Final position / round	First match	Last match
MLS	—	—	Eastern Conference Championship	March 21, 2009	November 14, 2009
USOC	Third round	—	Third round	June 30, 2009	
Superliga	Group A	—	Runner-up	June 20, 2009	August 5, 2009

Updated to match played October 18, 2008
Source: Competitions

=== Standings ===
Pos	Team	Pld	W	L	T	GF	GA	GD	Pts	Qualification
1	Columbus Crew	30	13	7	10	41	31	+10	49	MLS Cup Playoffs
2	Chicago Fire	30	11	7	12	39	34	+5	45	MLS Cup Playoffs
3	New England Revolution	30	11	10	9	33	37	−4	42	MLS Cup Playoffs
4	D.C. United	30	9	8	13	43	44	−1	40	
5	Toronto FC	30	10	11	9	37	46	−9	39	
6	Kansas City Wizards	30	8	13	9	33	42	−9	33	
7	New York Red Bulls	30	5	19	6	27	47	−20	21	

Source: MLS

Pos	Team	Pld	W	L	T	GF	GA	GD	Pts	Qualification
1	Columbus Crew (S)	30	13	7	10	41	31	+10	49	CONCACAF Champions League
2	LA Galaxy	30	12	6	12	36	31	+5	48	CONCACAF Champions League
3	Houston Dynamo	30	13	8	9	39	29	+10	48	North American SuperLiga
4	Seattle Sounders FC	30	12	7	11	38	29	+9	47	CONCACAF Champions League
5	Chicago Fire	30	11	7	12	39	34	+5	45	North American SuperLiga
6	Chivas USA	30	13	11	6	34	31	+3	45	North American SuperLiga
7	New England Revolution	30	11	10	9	33	37	−4	42	North American SuperLiga
8	Real Salt Lake (C)	30	11	12	7	43	35	+8	40	CONCACAF Champions League
9	Colorado Rapids	30	10	10	10	42	38	+4	40	
10	D.C. United	30	9	8	13	43	44	−1	40	
11	FC Dallas	30	11	13	6	50	47	+3	39	
12	Toronto FC	30	10	11	9	37	46	−9	39	CONCACAF Champions League
13	Kansas City Wizards	30	8	13	9	33	42	−9	33	
14	San Jose Earthquakes	30	7	14	9	36	50	−14	30	
15	New York Red Bulls	30	5	19	6	27	47	−20	21	

Source: MLS
Rules for classification: 1) points; 2) head-to-head record; 3) goal difference; 4) number of goals scored
(C) Champions; (S) Supporters' Shield

=== Results summary ===
Overall								Home						Away					
Pld	Pts	W	L	T	GF	GA	GD	W	L	T	GF	GA	GD	W	L	T	GF	GA	GD
30	45	11	7	12	39	34	+5	5	4	6	16	17	−1	6	3	6	23	17	+6

Last updated: October 22, 2009
Source: Major League Soccer
Pld = Matches played; Pts = Points; W = Matches won; T = Matches tied; L = Matches lost; GF = Goals for; GA = Goals against; GD = Goal difference

Round	1	2	3	4	5	6	7	8	9	10	11	12	13	14	15	16	17	18	19	20	21	22	23	24	25	26	27	28	29	30
Stadium	A	A	H	A	H	A	H	H	A	A	A	H	H	A	A	H	H	A	H	A	A	H	H	H	A	H	H	A	A	H
Result	W	T	W	T	T	T	T	T	W	W	W	L	L	L	W	T	W	T	W	L	W	L	W	L	T	T	T	L	T	W

Updated to match(es) played on October 22, 2009. Source: Chicago Fire
A = Away; H = Home; W = Win; L = Loss; T = Tie

== Matches ==
Win Tie Loss

=== March ===
March 21, 2009	FC Dallas	1–3	Chicago Fire	Frisco, Texas
	Ferreira (yellow card) 5'; Cooper 9'	Report	Mapp 38'; Soumaré (yellow card) 39'; McBride 51'; Thorrington (yellow card) 52'; Pappa (yellow card) 69'; Blanco 94+'	Stadium: Pizza Hut Park; Attendance: 15,905; Referee: Baldomero Toledo

March 28, 2009	D.C. United	1–1	Chicago Fire	Washington, D.C.
	Emilio 7'; Olsen (yellow card) 30'; Jakovic 79'; Burch (yellow card) 91+'	Report	Nyarko 53'	Stadium: RFK Stadium; Attendance: 15,895; Referee: Mark Geiger

=== April ===
April 5, 2009	Chicago Fire	1–0	New York Red Bulls	Bridgeview, Illinois
	Thorrington (red card) 14'; Pappa 33'	Report	Goldthwaite (yellow card) 44'; Richards (yellow card) 91+'	Stadium: Toyota Park; Attendance: 11,633; Referee: Tim Weyland

April 11, 2009	San Jose Earthquakes	3–3	Chicago Fire	Santa Clara, California
	Leitch (yellow card) 7'; Johnson 14'; Convey 43'; Alvarez 75'; Corrales (yellow card) 78'; Salinas (yellow card) 73' (yellow-red card) 81'	Report	Pappa 41'; Segares (yellow card) 55'; McBride 57'; Robinson (yellow card) 73'; Rolfe 85'	Stadium: Buck Shaw Stadium; Attendance: 9,717; Referee: Jorge Gonzalez

April 18, 2009	Chicago Fire	2–2	Kansas City Wizards	Bridgeview, Illinois
	McBride 13'; McBride 20'; Soumaré (yellow card) 70'	Report	López (yellow card) 64'; Wolff (yellow card) 66'; Wolff 78'; Wolff 89'	Stadium: Toyota Park; Attendance: 10,782; Referee: Hilario Grajeda

April 25, 2009	Columbus Crew	2–2	Chicago Fire	Columbus, Ohio
	Marshall 25'; Moreno 34'; Padula (red card) 57'; Zayner (yellow card) 80'	Report	Pappa (yellow card) 32'; Ward (yellow card) 64'; Thorrington (yellow card) 72'; McBride 86'; Segares 88'	Stadium: Columbus Crew Stadium; Attendance: 16,628; Referee: Jair Marrufo

=== May ===
May 2, 2009	Chicago Fire	1–1	Seattle Sounders FC	Bridgeview, Illinois
	Soumaré (yellow card) 55'; Pappa 68'; Rolfe (yellow card) 95+'	Report	Marshall (yellow card) 1'; Montero (red card) 48'; Marshall 74'; Riley (yellow card) 95+'	Stadium: Toyota Park; Attendance: 10,288; Referee: Jasen Anno

May 9, 2009	Chicago Fire	1–1	New England Revolution	Bridgeview, Illinois
	Conde 36'	Report	Joseph 49'; Larentowicz (yellow card) 60'; Heaps (yellow card) 79'	Stadium: Toyota Park; Attendance: 11,288; Referee: Mark Geiger

May 16, 2009	Toronto FC	0–2	Chicago Fire	Toronto, Ontario Canada
		Report	Rolfe 59'; Busch (yellow card) 77'; McBride 81'	Stadium: BMO Field; Attendance: 20,006; Referee: Ricardo Salazar

May 24, 2009	New York Red Bulls	0–1	Chicago Fire	East Rutherford, New Jersey
	Pacheco (yellow card) 44'	Report	Rolfe (yellow card) 17'; Rolfe 45'	Stadium: Giants Stadium; Attendance: 10,762; Referee: Kevin Stott

May 28, 2009	Chivas USA	2–3	Chicago Fire	Carson, California
	Nagamura 16'; Nagamura (yellow card) 24'; Galindo 37' (pen.); Galindo (yellow card) 41'; Marsch (yellow card) 51' (yellow-red card) 63'; Harris (yellow card) 77'; Trujillo (yellow card) 95+'; Talley (yellow card) 95+'	Report	Thorrington (yellow card) 10'; Blanco 25' (pen.); Conde (yellow card) 39'; Segares (yellow card) 41'; Blanco (yellow card) 54'; Nyarko 89'; Blanco 96+' (pen.)	Stadium: The Home Depot Center; Attendance: 20,379; Referee: Terry Vaughn

May 31, 2009	Chicago Fire	0–3	FC Dallas	Bridgeview, Illinois
	Rolfe (yellow card) 28'; Ward (yellow card) 34'; Soumaré (yellow card) 66' (yellow-red card) 79'	Report	Cunningham 15'; Brown 35' (o.g.); Torres (yellow card) 48'; Cunningham (yellow card) 54'; Ricchetti (yellow card) 58'; Cooper 80'	Stadium: Toyota Park; Attendance: 13,120; Referee: Shane Moody

=== June ===
June 5, 2009	Chicago Fire	0–1	Houston Dynamo	Bridgeview, Illinois
	Mapp (yellow card) 81'; Ward (yellow card) 88'	Report	Holden 4'; Davis (yellow card) 27'; Wondolowski (yellow card) 76'	Stadium: Toyota Park; Attendance: 13,246; Referee: Ricardo Salazar

June 13, 2009	D.C. United	2–1	Chicago Fire	Washington, D.C. USA
	Moreno 24' (pen.); Gomez 41'; Gomez (yellow card) 74'	Report	Busch (yellow card) 22'; Thorrington (yellow card) 27'; Pappa 33'; Conde (yellow card) 40'; Pause (yellow card) 70'	Stadium: Robert F. Kennedy Memorial Stadium; Attendance: 18,369; Referee: Baldomero Toledo

=== July ===
July 4, 2009	Colorado Rapids	1–2	Chicago Fire	Commerce City, Colorado
	Gibbs (yellow card) 24'; Peterson 76'; Casey (yellow card) 80'	Report	Pappa 30'; Conde 37'	Stadium: Dick's Sporting Goods Park; Attendance: 19,680; Referee: Jorge Gonzalez

July 11, 2009	Chicago Fire	0–0	Columbus Crew	Bridgeview, Illinois
	Ward (yellow card) 52'	Report	Ekpo (yellow card) 33'; Carroll (yellow card) 54'; Gaven (yellow card) 85'; Hejduk (yellow card) 88'	Stadium: Toyota Park; Attendance: 18,123; Referee: Michael Kennedy

July 18, 2009	Chicago Fire	2–0	San Jose Earthquakes	Bridgeview, Illinois
	Soumaré (yellow card) 17'; Nyarko 82'; Blanco 92+'	Report	Hernandez (yellow card) 2'; Wondolowski (yellow card) 5'; Zaher (yellow card) 90'	Stadium: Toyota Park; Attendance: 14,228; Referee: Jasen Anno

July 25, 2009	Seattle Sounders FC	0–0	Chicago Fire	Seattle, Washington
12:00 PST	Hurtado (yellow card) 28'; Ianni (yellow card) 57'; Ljungberg (yellow card) 59' (yellow-red card) 59'	Report	Segares (yellow card) 39'; Thorrington (yellow card) 40' (yellow-red card) 54'	Stadium: Qwest Field; Attendance: 32,405; Referee: Baldomero Toledo

=== August ===
August 1, 2009	Chicago Fire	1–0	Real Salt Lake	Bridgeview, Illinois
19:30 CDT	Segares (yellow card) 8'; Nyarko 76'	Report		Stadium: Toyota Park; Attendance: 14,534; Referee: Alex Prus

August 9, 2009	Houston Dynamo	3–2	Chicago Fire	Houston, Texas
	Kamara 21'; Clark 37'; Ching (yellow card) 56'; Holden 83' (pen.)	Report	Brown (yellow card) 35'; Prideaux (yellow card) 39'; Busch (yellow card) 46'; Rolfe 46' (yellow card) 62'; Lowry 48'; Blanco (yellow card) 73'	Stadium: Robertson Stadium; Attendance: 18,809; Referee: Terry Vaughn

August 16, 2009	Kansas City Wizards	0–2	Chicago Fire	Kansas City, Kansas
	Hirsig (yellow card) 68'; Hercegfalvi (red card) 85'	Report	Rolfe 13'; Mapp (yellow card) 45'; Banner 89'; Pause (yellow card) 91+'	Stadium: CommunityAmerica Ballpark; Attendance: 9,974; Referee: Jorge Gonzalez

August 19, 2009	Chicago Fire	0–2	Los Angeles Galaxy	Bridgeview, Illinois
	Thorrington (yellow card) 60'	Report	Magee 23'; Miglioranzi (yellow card) 43'; Donovan 54'; Ricketts (yellow card) 72'	Stadium: Toyota Park; Attendance: 20,000; Referee: Silviu Petrescu

August 23, 2009	Chicago Fire	3–2	Colorado Rapids	Bridgeview, Illinois
	Blanco 72' (pen.); Banner 85'; Robinson (yellow card) 85' (yellow-red card) 93+'; Robinson 93+'	Report	Cummings 48' 58'; Casey (yellow card) 65'; Kimura (yellow card) 71'; Cummings (yellow card) 82'; Gibbs (yellow card) 91+'	Stadium: Toyota Park; Attendance: 15,789; Referee: Ramon Hernandez

August 29, 2009	Chicago Fire	0–1	D.C. United	Bridgeview, Illinois
		Report	Namoff 11'; Burch (yellow card) 36'; Fred (yellow card) 44'; Namoff (yellow card) 53'; Jakovic (yellow card) 94+'	Stadium: Toyota Park; Attendance: 16,324; Referee: Kevin Stott

=== September ===
September 12, 2009	Real Salt Lake	1–1	Chicago Fire	Sandy, Utah
	Beltran (yellow card) 23'; Olave (yellow card) 27'; Olave 72'	Report	Lowry (yellow card) 32'; Rolfe 44'; Carr (yellow card) 79'	Stadium: Rio Tinto Stadium; Attendance: 17,615; Referee: Alex Prus

September 20, 2009	Chicago Fire	2–2	Columbus Crew	Bridgeview, Illinois
	Lowry 6'; Lowry 35'; Mapp (yellow card) 70'	Report	Padula (yellow card) 7'; Schelotto 55'; Schelotto 78' (pen.)	Stadium: Toyota Park; Attendance: 16,549; Referee: Mark Geiger

September 26, 2009	Chicago Fire	2–2	Toronto FC	Bridgeview, Illinois
	Garcia 14' (o.g.); Prideaux (yellow card) 61'; McBride 78'	Report	De Rosario 6'; Wynne (yellow card) 25'; Barrett 46'; Robinson (yellow card) 81'	Stadium: Toyota Park; Attendance: 16,890; Referee: Edvin Jurisevic

=== October ===
October 2, 2009	Los Angeles Galaxy	1–0	Chicago Fire	Carson, California
	Donovan 42'; Birchall (yellow card) 45'; Klein (yellow card) 63'	Report		Stadium: The Home Depot Center; Attendance: 21,679; Referee: Alex Prus

October 17, 2009	New England Revolution	0–0	Chicago Fire	Foxborough, Massachusetts
	Banner (yellow card) 5'; McBride (yellow card) 62'	Report	Nyassi (yellow card) 41'	Stadium: Gillette Stadium; Attendance: 18,064; Referee: Jorge Gonzalez

October 22, 2009	Chicago Fire	1–0	Chivas USA	Bridgeview, Illinois
	Lillingston 67' (o.g.)	Report	Braun (yellow card) 70'; Cuesta (yellow card) 87'	Stadium: Toyota Park; Attendance: 17,537; Referee: Terry Vaughn

=== MLS playoffs ===
November 1, 2009 Conf. Semifinals	New England Revolution	2–1	Chicago Fire	Foxborough, Massachusetts
14:00 PST	Alston (yellow card) 41'; Osei 47+'; Joseph 75'	report	Rolfe 17'; Husidic (yellow card) 93+'	Stadium: Gillette Stadium; Attendance: 7,416; Referee: Baldomero Toledo

November 7, 2009 Conf. Semifinals	Chicago Fire	2–0	New England Revolution	Bridgeview, Illinois
19:30 CST	Thorrington 35'; Blanco 83'	report	Mansally (yellow card) 17'; Jankauskas (yellow card) 36'; Larentowicz (yellow card) 85'	Stadium: Toyota Park; Attendance: 21,528; Referee: Alex Prus

November 14, 2009 Conf. Finals	Chicago Fire	0–0 (a.e.t.) (4–5 p)	Real Salt Lake	Bridgeview, Illinois
19:00 CST	Thorrington (yellow card) 92+'; Prideaux (yellow card) 101'; Blanco (yellow card) 117'	Report	Morales (yellow card) 39'; Wingert (yellow card) 75'; Beckerman (yellow card) 99'; Johnson (yellow card) 110'	Stadium: Toyota Park; Attendance: 21,723; Referee: Ricardo Salazar
	Penalties
	Blanco (penalty scored); McBride (penalty scored); Conde (penalty scored); Thorrington (penalty missed); Brown (penalty scored); Pause (penalty missed); Prideaux (penalty missed)		Mathis (penalty scored); Morales (penalty missed); Findley (penalty scored); Beckerman (penalty scored); Johnson (penalty scored); Espindola (penalty missed); Grabavoy (penalty scored)

=== SuperLiga 2009 ===
June 20, 2009 Group stage	Chicago Fire (United States)	1–0	(Mexico) San Luis	Bridgeview, Illinois
20:00 EDT	McBride 57'	Report	Delacruz (yellow card) 87'	Stadium: Toyota Park; Attendance: 8,421; Referee: Silviu Petrescu (Canada)

June 23, 2009 Group stage	Chicago Fire (United States)	1–0	(United States) Chivas USA	Bridgeview, Illinois
20:00 EDT	Mapp 35'; Conde (yellow card) 82'	Report	Curtin (yellow card) 82'; Eskandarian (yellow card) 82'	Stadium: Toyota Park; Attendance: 9,126; Referee: Mark Geiger (USA)

June 27, 2009 Group stage	Chicago Fire (United States)	1–2	(Mexico) UANL	Bridgeview, Illinois
20:00 EDT	Blanco 85'	Report	Pulido 37'; Viniegra (yellow card) 60'; Pulido 61'; Cabrera (yellow card) 80'; Garcia (yellow card) 84'	Stadium: Toyota Park; Attendance: 9,157; Referee: Kevin Thomas (Jamaica)

July 15, 2009 Semifinals	New England (United States)	1–2	(United States) Chicago Fire	Foxborough, Massachusetts
19:00 EDT	Phelan (yellow card) 4'; Jankauskas 44'	Report	Soumaré (yellow card) 6'; McBride 34'; Blanco (yellow card) 36'; Blanco 63'; Pappa (yellow card) 80'	Stadium: Gillette Stadium; Referee: Paul Ward (USA)

August 5, 2009 Final	Chicago Fire (United States)	1–1 (a.e.t.) (3–4 p)	(Mexico) UANL	Bridgeview, Illinois
19:00 CDT	Nyarko 10'	Report	Ayala (yellow card) 32'; Itamar 43'	Stadium: Toyota Park; Attendance: 20,000; Referee: Joel Aguilar
	Penalties
	Blanco (penalty scored); Banner (penalty missed); Rolfe (penalty scored); Mapp (penalty missed); Woolard (penalty scored)		(penalty scored) Fernández; (penalty missed) Viniegra; (penalty scored) Ayala; (penalty scored) Pulido; (penalty scored) Itamar

=== U.S. Open Cup ===
June 30, 2009 Third round	Chicago Fire	0–1	Wilmington Hammerheads (USL-2)	Wilmington, North Carolina
7:00 PM EDT	Soumaré (yellow card) 42'	Report	Walters (yellow card) 6'; Bundy 37'; Briggs (yellow card) 66'; Watson (yellow card) 70'	Stadium: Legion Stadium

=== Friendlies ===
April 29, 2009	Chicago Fire (United States)	1–2	(Mexico) Club América	Bridgeview, Illinois
	Rolfe 72'	Report	Silva 2'; Pardo 42'	Stadium: Toyota Park; Attendance: 17,342
