= John Guppy =

John Guppy may refer to:

- John Guppy (businessman)
- John Guppy (politician)
