= Brimstone Cup =

American soccer rivalry

- Brimstone Cup logo
- Type: Cup awarded to the team with the most aggregate points
- Teams: Chicago Fire FC; FC Dallas
- First meeting: June 17, 1998; MLS regular season Chicago Fire 1–0 Dallas Burn
- Latest meeting: March 8, 2025; MLS regular season FC Dallas 1–3 Chicago Fire
- Stadiums: Toyota Stadium; Soldier Field

Statistics
- All-time series: Dallas 18–6–13 Chicago

The Brimstone Cup is a soccer trophy awarded to the yearly winner of the Major League Soccer rivalry between Chicago Fire FC and FC Dallas. The cup is awarded by the Brimstone Cup Committee to the team with the most points in games played between the two. If the two teams have the same points against each other at the end of the year (including MLS regular season and playoff games and the U.S. Open Cup), then the cup stays with the team holding it at the beginning of the year.

The cup was created during the 2001 season by the supporters' groups of both clubs, Section 8 from Chicago and the Inferno from Dallas. Its name came from a reference of the names of the two teams at the time, as FC Dallas was then known as the Dallas Burn. The name is reflected with a quote from Virgil's Aeneid engraved on the base: "The more the kindled combat rises high'r, The more with fury burns the blazing fire." The two supporters groups contracted with the R.S. Owens Corporation, the makers of the Academy Awards since 1982, to craft the physical Brimstone Cup.

== Winners ==
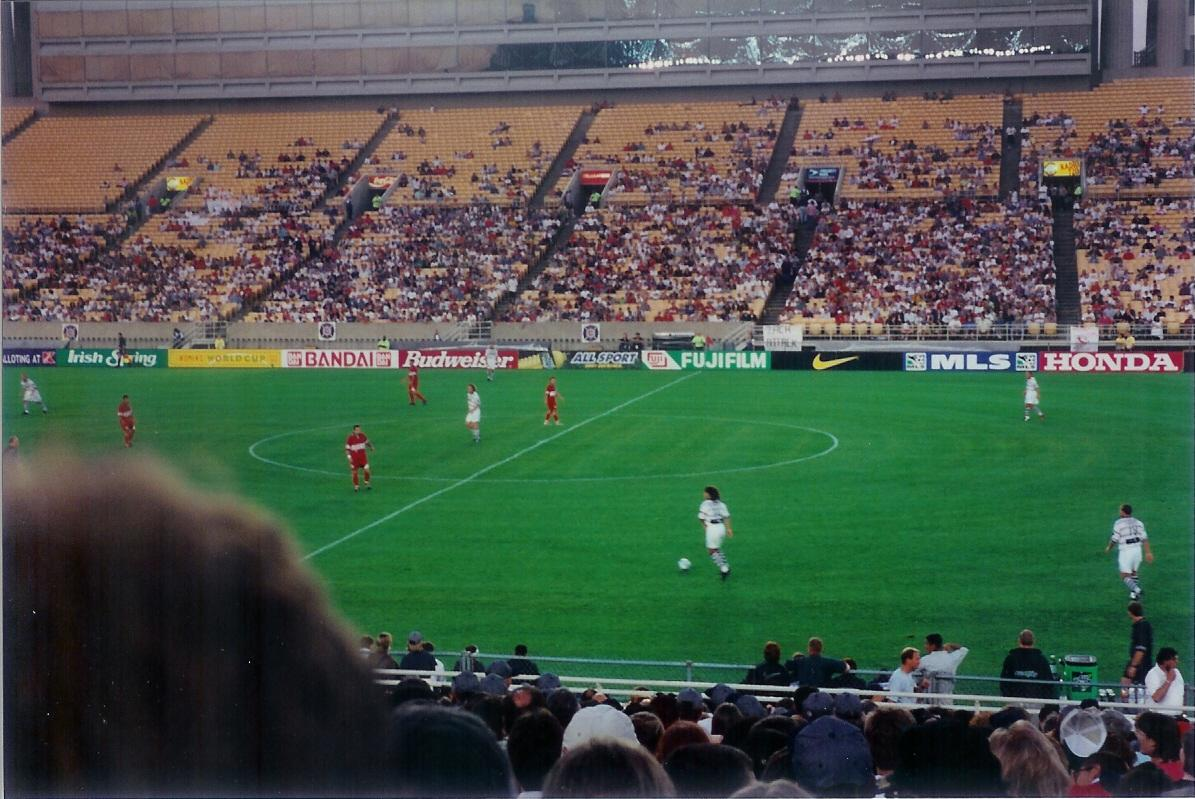
Fire vs. Burn on July 4, 1998. The Brimstone Cup was created during the 2001 MLS season.

Unofficial results^{1}

Year	Winner	Chicago pts	Dallas pts	Note
1998	Chicago Fire	9	3	Won in regular season
1999	Chicago Fire	4	2	Won in regular season
2000	Chicago Fire	9	6	Tie broken in U.S. Open Cup quarterfinals

Year	Winner	Chicago pts	Dallas pts	Note
2001	Chicago Fire	11	5	Tie broken in playoff series
2002	Dallas Burn	0	6	Won in regular season
2003	Dallas Burn	3	3	No winner, Dallas Burn retain the Cup
2004	Dallas Burn	0	6	Won in regular season
2005	FC Dallas	3	6	Tie broken in U.S. Open Cup semifinals
2006	FC Dallas	0	6	Won in regular season
2007	FC Dallas	1	4	Won in regular season
2008	FC Dallas	0	6	Won in regular season
2009	FC Dallas	3	3	No winner, FC Dallas retains the Cup
2010	FC Dallas	1	4	Won in regular season
2011	FC Dallas	1	4	Won in regular season
2012	Chicago Fire	3	0	Won in regular season
2013	Chicago Fire	3	0	Won in regular season
2014	Chicago Fire	3	0	Won in regular season
2015	Chicago Fire	3	0	Won in regular season
2016	FC Dallas	0	3	Won in regular season
2017	Chicago Fire	3	0	Won in regular season
2018	FC Dallas	0	3	Won in regular season
2019	Chicago Fire	3	0	Won in regular season
2020	None	0	0	No winner, match not played (COVID-19)
2021	None	0	0	No winner, no matches held
2022	Chicago Fire	1	1	No winner, Chicago Fire retains the Cup
2023	None	0	0	No winner, no matches held
2024	None	0	0	No winner, no matches held
2025	Chicago Fire	3	0	Won in regular season
2026	None	0	0	No winner, no matches held

^{1}The Brimstone Cup did not exist in the years 1998–2000. These results were determined retroactively and are unofficial.

== Series results by year ==
Venue	Date	FCD score	Fire score
Cotton Bowl	April 21, 2001	3	2
Soldier Field	July 21, 2001	1	2
Soldier Field	September 8, 2001	2	2
Soldier Field	September 20, 2001	0	2
Cotton Bowl	September 23, 2001	1	1
Soldier Field	September 29, 2001	0	2
Cardinal Stadium	June 15, 2002	3	1
Cotton Bowl	August 10, 2002	3	1
Cardinal Stadium	June 18, 2003	1	4
Dragon Stadium	September 20, 2003	2	0
Soldier Field	April 17, 2004	2	0
Cotton Bowl	August 28, 2004	4	1
Cotton Bowl	April 2, 2005	2	1
Soldier Field	June 12, 2005	0	2
Pizza Hut Park	September 14, 2005	1	0
Pizza Hut Park	April 1, 2006	3	2
Toyota Park	July 15, 2006	3	2
Toyota Park	May 17, 2007	2	1
Pizza Hut Park	September 20, 2007	1	1
Pizza Hut Park	June 15, 2008	1	0
Toyota Park	September 21, 2008	4	1
Pizza Hut Park	March 21, 2009	1	3
Toyota Park	May 31, 2009	3	0
Toyota Park	May 27, 2010	1	1
Pizza Hut Park	October 2, 2010	3	0
Pizza Hut Park	March 19, 2011	1	1
Toyota Park	October 12, 2011	2	1
Toyota Park	May 23, 2012	1	2
Toyota Stadium	October 12, 2013	2	3
Toyota Stadium	August 30, 2014	0	1
Toyota Park	August 2, 2015	0	2
Toyota Stadium	July 16, 2016	3	1
Toyota Park	May 25, 2017	1	2
Toyota Stadium	July 14, 2018	3	1
SeatGeek Stadium	September 14, 2019	0	4
Soldier Field	April 2, 2022	0	0
Toyota Stadium	March 8, 2025	1	3
