= Chicago Fire FC =

American professional soccer club based in Chicago

- Nicknames: The Fire; The Men in Red
- Founded: October 8, 1997; 29 years ago
- Stadium: Soldier Field; Chicago, Illinois
- Capacity: 61,500
- Owner: Joe Mansueto
- Sporting director: Gregg Berhalter
- Head coach: Gregg Berhalter
- League: Major League Soccer
- 2026: Eastern Conference: 4th Overall: 6th Playoffs: TBD
- Website: chicagofirefc.com
Home colors	Away colors	Third colors

Chicago Fire Football Club is an American professional soccer club based in Chicago. The club competes in Major League Soccer (MLS) as a member of the Eastern Conference. The Fire play their home games at Soldier Field, which they share with the Chicago Bears of the National Football League (NFL).

The franchise, named in memory of the Great Chicago Fire of 1871, was founded as the Chicago Fire Soccer Club on October 8, 1997, the Great Fire's 126th anniversary. The team began play in 1998 as one of the league's first expansion teams. The Fire won the MLS Cup as well as the U.S. Open Cup (the "double") in their first season in 1998. They also won U.S. Open Cups in 2000, 2003, and 2006, in addition to the 2003 MLS Supporters' Shield. Chicago Fire FC is valued at over $500 million. They have the longest drought in appearing in the MLS Cup, having last appeared in 2003.

The club maintains an extensive development system, consisting of the Chicago Fire Development Academy and the Chicago Fire Juniors youth organization. They also operate the Chicago Fire Foundation, the team's community-based charitable division.

== History ==
=== Overview ===
Chicago Fire Football Club was founded as Chicago Fire Soccer Club on October 8, 1997. The club is named after the Great Chicago Fire of 1871; the official founding date of the team was the 126th anniversary of that event. The owner and chairman of the Fire is Joe Mansueto, who purchased the club in 2019. The club president is Ishwara Glassman-Chrein; Georg Heitz was appointed sporting director in December 2019; The Fire were originally based at Soldier Field from 1997 to 2006. From 2006 to 2019, the club played at SeatGeek Stadium, a stadium originally built for the club, at 71st and Harlem Avenue in Bridgeview. In 2019, with the change of ownership to Joe Mansueto, the Fire returned to Soldier Field for the 2020 MLS season. The Fire are currently one of the most successful clubs in the U.S. Open Cup, winning championships in 1998, 2000, 2003, and 2006.

Many notable players have worn the Fire shirt, including U.S. internationals Chris Armas, Carlos Bocanegra, Frank Klopas, DaMarcus Beasley, Brian McBride, Tony Sanneh, Cory Gibbs, Ante Razov, Josh Wolff, Eric Wynalda and Jon Busch. Some of the club's other notable American professional players include C.J. Brown, Jesse Marsch, Chris Rolfe, and Zach Thornton. The Fire also have a reputation for importing international talent, from established veterans like Bastian Schweinsteiger, Pável Pardo, Piotr Nowak, Cuauhtémoc Blanco, Tomasz Frankowski, Luboš Kubík, Hristo Stoichkov and Jorge Campos; in addition to younger players such as Patrick Nyarko, Marco Pappa, Damani Ralph, Bakary Soumaré and Nery Castillo.

Chicago was once the home of the Chicago Sting who competed in the top-level North American Soccer League (NASL) from 1975 to 1984. They spread their home games at Soldier Field, Wrigley Field, and Comiskey Park. The Sting won the Soccer Bowl twice: 1981 and 1984. They were the only club other than the New York Cosmos to win multiple titles in the NASL. Some of the club's notable players were Argentine striker Pato Margetic and German forwards Karl-Heinz Granitza and Arno Steffenhagen.

=== Foundation and initial success (1997–2000) ===
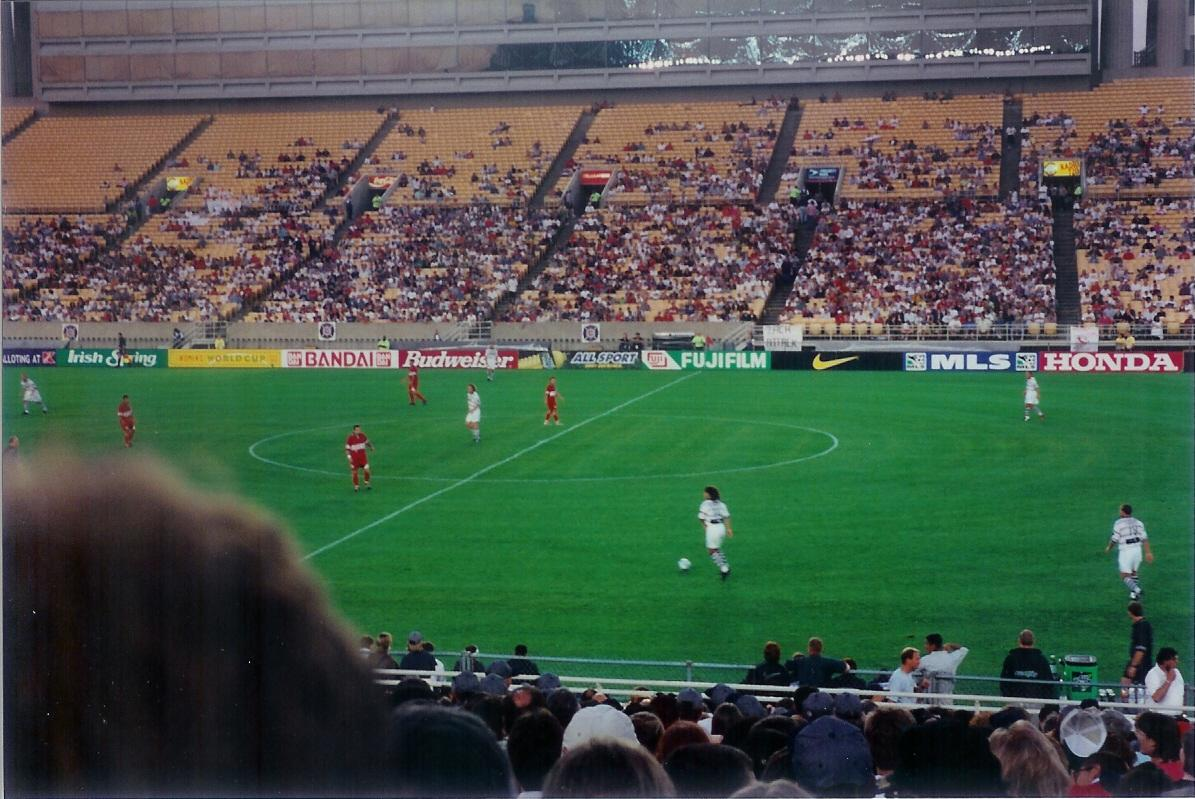
The Fire (in red) hosting the Dallas Burn at Soldier Field in July 1998

Founded in 1997 at Navy Pier, on the anniversary of the Great Fire, the Fire immediately tapped into the diverse ethnic makeup of the city. The team brought in Polish players Piotr Nowak, Jerzy Podbrożny, and Roman Kosecki; the Mexican Jorge Campos; and the Czech Luboš Kubík. While all showed their talent while playing for Chicago that first year, American players (Zach Thornton, Chris Armas, C.J. Brown) proved most integral to the Fire's continued success. Under the club's first head coach, Bob Bradley—and against all expectation—the team completed the double in its first competitive year, beating D.C. United in the 1998 MLS Cup Final, and defeating the Columbus Crew in Chicago to win the 1998 U.S. Open Cup a week later.

The team's momentum continued, winning the 2000 U.S. Open Cup over the Miami Fusion and reaching the 2000 MLS Cup final, losing to the Kansas City Wizards. Internationally experienced players such as Hristo Stoitchkov joined the Fire, while young American talents such as DaMarcus Beasley developed. The Fire quickly became cemented as one of the league's preeminent teams.

=== Nomadic times (2002–2004) ===
With Soldier Field undergoing massive renovations, the Fire moved to the western Chicago suburb of Naperville in 2002. That same year, Bob Bradley abruptly departed the team to lead the MetroStars, from his home state of New Jersey. The Fire then selected the U.S. men's national team's top assistant, Dave Sarachan, to assume the vacant post.

Chicago qualified for the league final while also capturing the Supporters' Shield and 2003 U.S. Open Cup along the way. The team returned to Chicago and the renovated Soldier Field midway through the 2003 season.

After that season, longtime captain Piotr Nowak retired to take a position in the front office. He departed a year later to become manager of D.C. United. In this period new talent emerged, including Jamaican striker Damani Ralph. Still, stagnating performances and the building strength of the Eastern Conference made Chicago's league position ever more tenuous. In 2004, the team missed the league playoffs for the first time in their history.

=== Turmoil, and a permanent home (2005–2007) ===
The 2005 season began with the unexpected dismissal of popular club president Peter Wilt by then-owners AEG, a move decried by fans, many players, and club staff. This came as a shock, given his brokering of a $100m deal to build the Fire a stadium in the collar suburb of Bridgeview. He was immediately replaced by MetroStars executive John Guppy.

Competitively, the season was most notable for the blockbuster visit of Milan from Italy's Serie A, and the surprising 4–0 away defeat of D.C. United in the Eastern Conference Semi-finals.

2006 arrived, and the Fire moved from Soldier Field into its new stadium in Bridgeview, a southwest suburb of Chicago: Toyota Park, located at the corner of 71st Street and Harlem Avenue. In its first season, it played host to an unspectacular league campaign; but victory in the 2006 U.S. Open Cup marked a continuation of the club's successes and promise for the future.

The anxiety to win another league title continued to grow, however. Sarachan entered 2007 (his fifth season in charge) under intense pressure from fans and the administration to produce a league championship. Tension mounted further on April 3, 2007, when the Fire signed Mexico and América star Cuauhtémoc Blanco to a Designated Player contract. After a perfect three matches to open the year, they won only one of their next eight, and Sarachan was dismissed. Following a brief search, Millonarios manager Juan Carlos Osorio was named the club's third head coach.

=== Andell Inc. acquisition of the Fire (2007–2009) ===
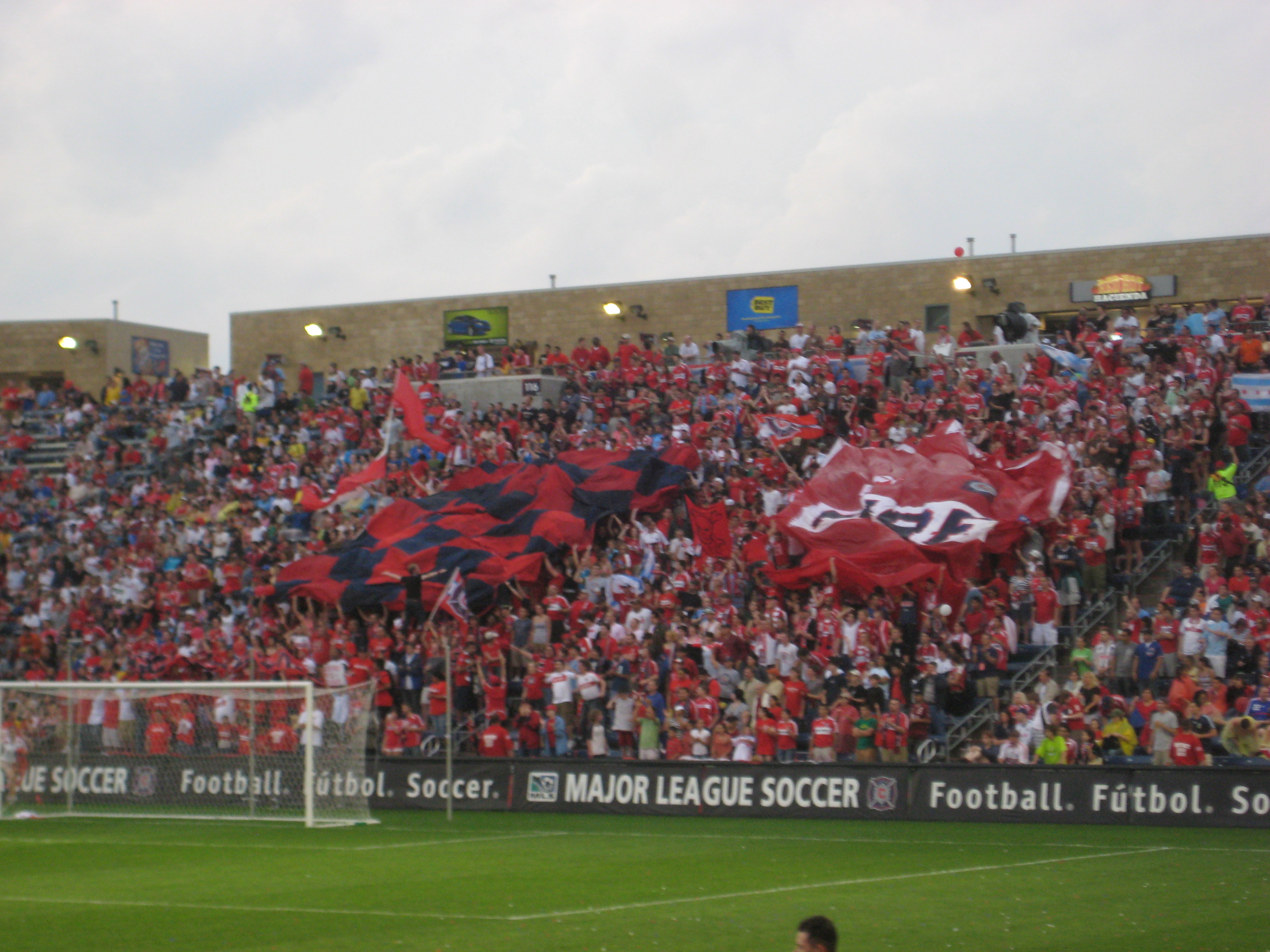
Section 8 during a June 2008 match at Toyota Park

More change came soon afterward. On September 6, 2007, Andell Holdings, a Los Angeles-based private investment firm controlled by chairman Andrew Hauptman, acquired AEG's interest in the Chicago Fire Soccer Club. Reports estimated the purchase price to be upwards of $35 million. The team has not won a major trophy since Hauptman bought the team.

On the field, behind Blanco and Wilman Conde, Osorio's central defender at Millionarios, the Fire went on an extended unbeaten run to close the season, easily qualifying for the playoffs but were defeated at New England in the Eastern Conference Final. On December 10, 2007, the Fire announced Osorio's resignation. He was named manager of the New York Red Bulls eight days later. Hauptman filed tampering charges with the league in protest, and the Fire were compensated by the Red Bulls with cash and draft picks.

Changes came quickly in Osorio's wake. On January 17, 2008, former Fire star Frank Klopas was named Technical Director in charge of player personnel, and longtime Fire assistant Denis Hamlett was appointed manager. While the Fire struggled at home in 2008 the team found unusual success on the road, gathering 22 out of a possible 45 away points. Momentum grew with the long-anticipated signing of Chicago native Brian McBride on a free transfer in July 2008. After disposing of the Red Bulls 5–2 in the season's final game, they decisively conquered New England in the first round of the playoffs with a 3–0 victory at home. This was Chicago's first playoff advancement over the Revolution in four consecutive seasons. But triumph only lasted for a week, as they again missed the league final with their 2–1 Eastern Conference Final loss to eventual champion Columbus.

The 2009 season saw few alterations to the previous year's roster. The story of the season was much the same, as continued poor home form offset excellent performances away from Toyota Park. This led to a second place Eastern Conference finish behind Columbus. Despite this, Real Salt Lake managed to upset the Crew in the quarterfinals, meaning Chicago would host the semi-final for the first time in six years. Chicago's nearly flawless home playoff history meant little in the end, as they lost to Salt Lake, 5–3, on penalties after 120 scoreless minutes. Shortly thereafter, manager Denis Hamlett was dismissed.

=== A team in flux (2010–2012) ===
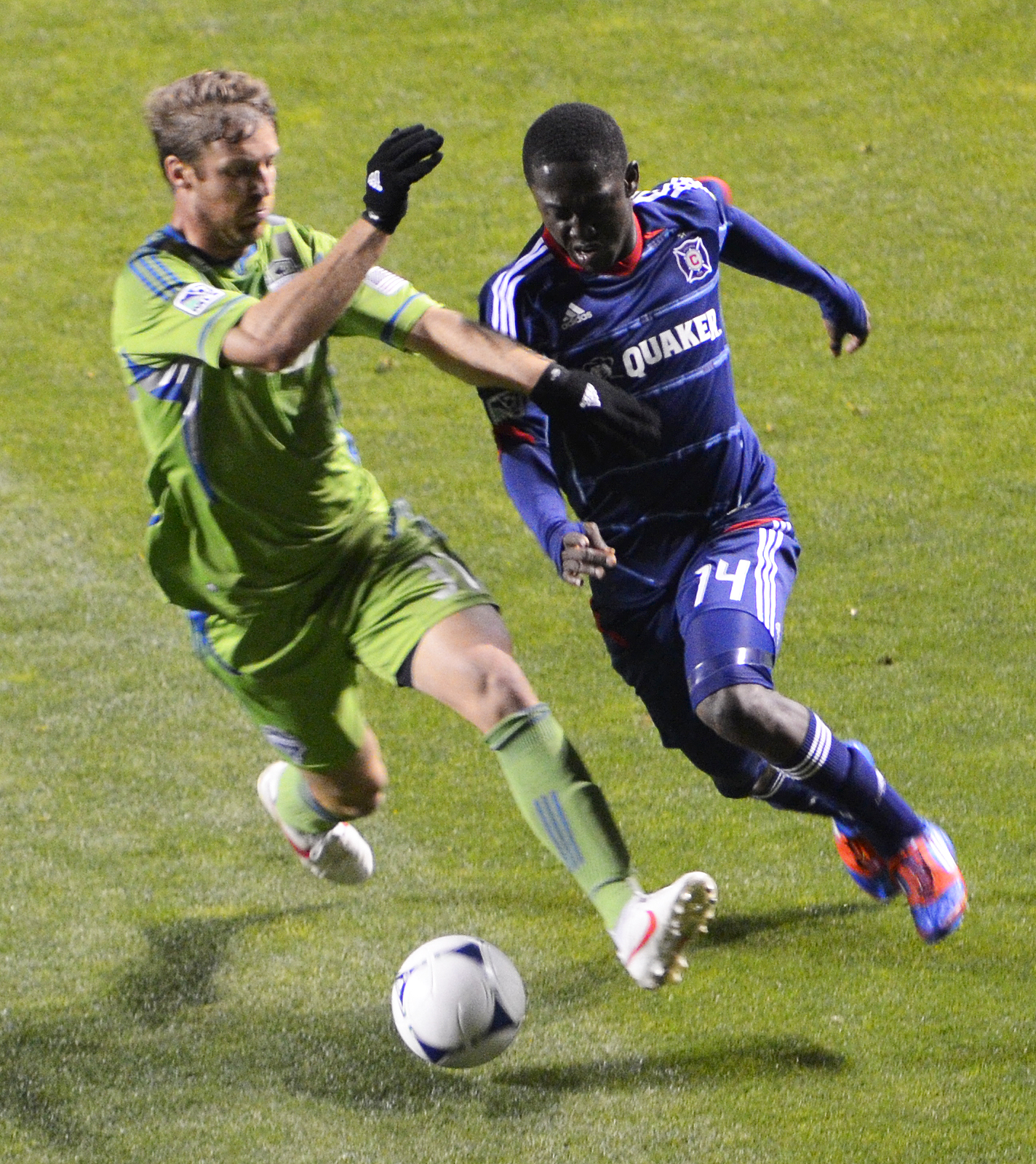
Chicago's Patrick Nyarko (right) dribbling past a Seattle defender during an April 2012 match

Leading up to 2010, Chicago hired Carlos de los Cobos as head coach, previously manager of El Salvador. Cuauhtémoc Blanco, Chris Rolfe and Gonzalo Segares all departed. More changes came in the summer transfer window with the trade of Justin Mapp to Philadelphia, the acquisition of Mexican international striker Nery Castillo, and the trade for former Swedish international midfielder Freddie Ljungberg. Defender Gonzalo Segares returned to the Fire, leaving Apollon Limassol after only six months away. Despite these reinforcements, the Fire failed to qualify for the playoffs for only the second time in club history. Former U.S. international Brian McBride and club original C.J. Brown retired at season's end, followed closely by the departures of Wilman Conde, Ljungberg, and Castillo.

2011 began much in the way of 2010, with foundering performances both home and away. After nine winless matches, Carlos de los Cobos was let go on May 30, 2011. Technical Director Frank Klopas was named interim head coach. Behind summer reinforcements Pável Pardo and Sebastián Grazzini, as well as forward Dominic Oduro's 12 goals after being acquired in a trade from Houston and Dan Gargan's defensive addition, the Fire qualified for the U.S. Open Cup Final (lost at Seattle) and narrowly missed making the playoffs after gaining 24 points in their last 12 league matches. After the season's conclusion, Klopas was given the permanent manager job on November 3, 2011.

Although expectations were modest for 2012, Klopas' first full season as coach, the year saw a change in fortune for the Fire. The spring and summer months saw several new acquisitions for the club, starting with the reacquiring of Chris Rolfe from Aalborg BK. Rolfe, who scored eight goals and 12 assists in the 21 games he played in 2012, would later be named the Fire's MVP. Other signings included Brazilian midfielders Alex Monteiro de Lima from the Swiss side FC Wohlen, Alvaro Fernández from Seattle Sounders FC, forward Sherjill MacDonald from Beerschot AC of Belgium and veteran defender Arne Friedrich from VfL Wolfsburg. Although they would fall out of the U.S. Open tournament early that season, the Fire eventually compiled a 17–11–6 record, their best since 2000, and ranked as high as second in the Eastern Conference before ending the year in fourth place. On October 31, 2012, in their first playoff appearance since 2009, the Fire lost their first-round MLS Cup playoff match-up at home against the Houston Dynamo, 2–1.

=== Missing the playoffs (2013–2015) ===
In the 2012–2013 offseason, the franchise made some moves to improve on 2012's success. The team acquired Joel Lindpere and Jeff Larentowicz and also traded Dominic Oduro for Dilly Duka and the rights to Robbie Rogers. The beginning of the season saw the team struggling to score goals, resulting in a record of 2–5–1 through April. After two successive losses to the Union in May, and with veteran Arne Friedrich still on injured reserve, the Fire acquired their former centerback Bakary Soumaré from Philadelphia. Also in May, Robbie Rogers expressed an interest to play in Southern California, at which point a deal was brokered for Rogers' rights in exchange for Chicago native Mike Magee from the Los Angeles Galaxy. On June 23, 2013, Friedrich, who had not played a 2012–13 game due to recurring injuries, announced his retirement. After starting the season 2–7–3, the additions of Soumare and Magee led to seven wins in the squad's last 10 games. The Fire were busy in the transfer window as well, adding veteran defensive midfielder Arévalo Ríos and forward Juan Luis Anangonó. The Chicago Fire also advanced to host the semifinal of the 2013 Lamar Hunt U.S. Open Cup, but fell 2–0 to eventual champions D.C. United. Alleged fan actions in the stadium that night led to a famous editorial piece, "What it means to be a part of the Fire family", being penned by the club's Director of Communications, which was seen as an odd attack on the fan base and widely panned by local and national media. After a 12–6–6 finish to the season, the Fire narrowly missed the playoffs for the third time in the last four years—losing out to the Montreal Impact on goal difference. On October 30, 2013, the club announced that the president of soccer operations Javier Leon and head coach Frank Klopas had stepped down, but the Fire front office had a replacement one day later. On October 31, 2013, Chicago Fire named Frank Yallop as its new head coach and director of soccer. On December 5, 2013, Fire MVP Mike Magee became the first Fire player to win the MLS MVP Award—beating out Los Angeles Galaxy's Robbie Keane and Montreal Impact's Marco Di Vaio for the honor.

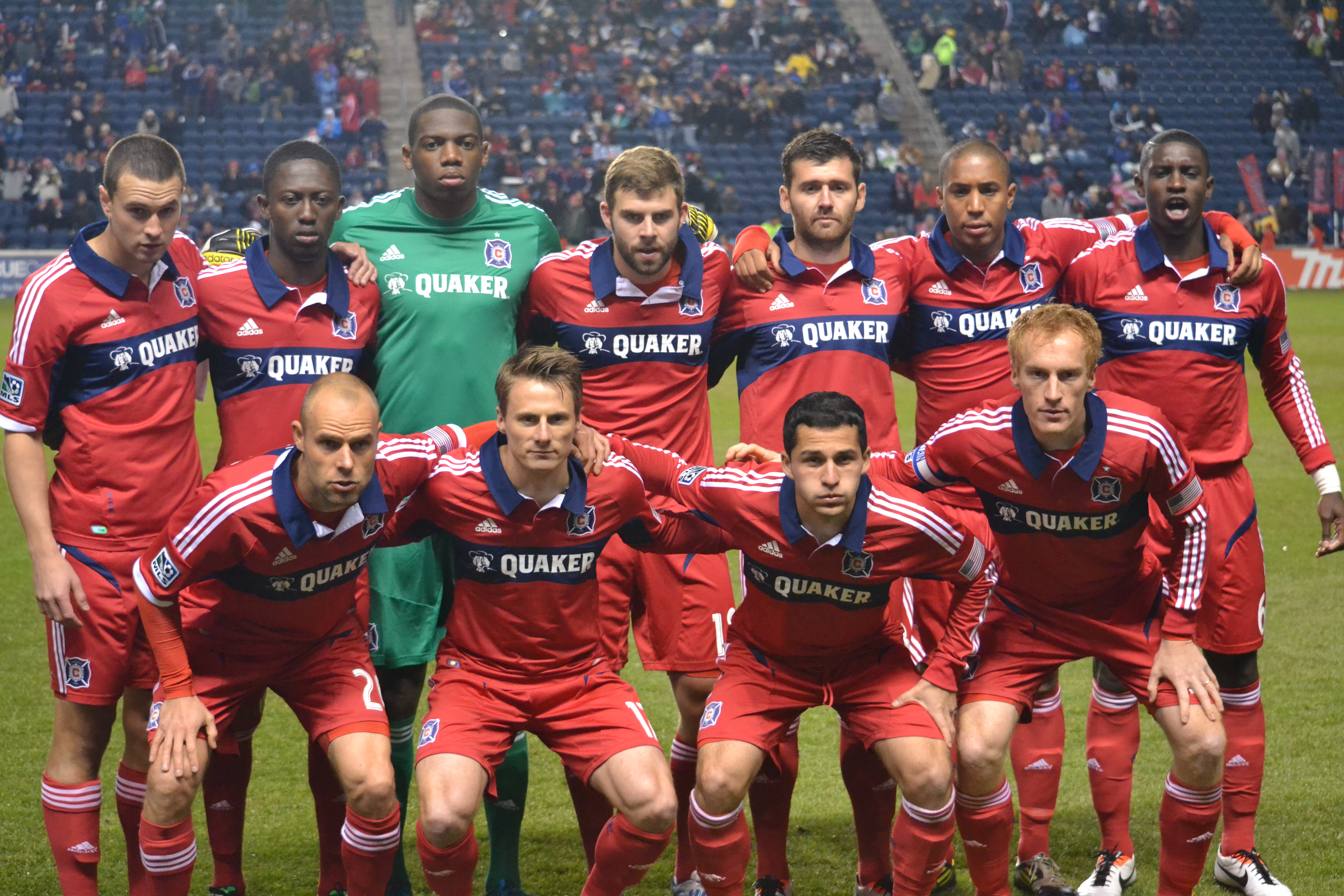
Chicago Fire F.C. lineup photo, 2013

Meanwhile, Yallop was busy recruiting a new coaching staff which included "Ring of Fire" member and Chicago Fire veteran C. J. Brown and former U.S. International striker Clint Mathis as the team's assistant coaches, adding Columbus Crew's Brian Bliss as Technical Director. Former Fire forward Brian McBride was added as an assistant coach in May 2014 for a short-term assignment. The shake-up extended to the roster, as Yallop moved team veterans and starters and brought in youth prospects—reforming the team while freeing up cap space. Major exits in early 2014 included Chris Rolfe, Austin Berry, Jalil Anibaba, Daniel Paladini, and Paolo Tornaghi. Filling that void was a handful of youth prospects including Harrison Shipp (homegrown player), Benji Joya (via MLS "weighted lottery"), and Grant Ward on loan from Tottenham Hotspur. Despite rarely looking like a team that could advance to the MLS Cup Playoffs, the team once again advanced to the semifinals of the 2014 Lamar Hunt U.S. Open Cup, but were routed 6–0 by eventual champions Seattle Sounders FC on August 13. The result was the worst competitive defeat in club history and saw Frank Yallop issue an apology to Chicago Fire supporters on the club's official website. As the Cup run had, the season ended in disappointment, with the Fire ending the season with a 6–18–10 record, with 18 draws, also setting a record for most draws in an MLS season in the process.

The club began 2015 with renewed hope, bringing three new Designated Player signings in David Accam, Shaun Maloney and Kennedy Igboananike to bolster an anemic attack. The club also signed products Michael Stephens and Eric Gehrig as well as Trinindad and Tobago international Joevin Jones. With so many new pieces needing to adjust, 2015 marked the first time in club history the side began the season with an 0–3–0 record, but they showed signs of recovery by winning their next three matches. April was the last time the club would be anywhere near equal on wins and losses, but the side did still advance to another Lamar Hunt U.S. Open Cup semifinal. Playing in front of a sparse crowd at the Philadelphia Union's PPL Park, the Fire fell 1–0 at the same hurdle for the third straight season. Less than two weeks later, Maloney, who was the club's center piece offseason signing, was transferred back to England with Hull City citing personal reasons.

Despite no hope for a Cup final, widespread fan protests and dim likelihood of a playoff berth, the club didn't part ways with Frank Yallop until September 20, 2015, one day after another listless 1–0 home defeat to Orlando City SC. Along with Yallop's departure, the club announced it had named long-time MLS executive Nelson Rodríguez as the club's new general manager, with his first job being to commence a search for a new head coach. Technical director Brian Bliss was given the interim head coaching job, with former player and current club vice president Logan Pause assisting for the remaining five matches. The club has finished the 2015 season with an overall record of 8 wins, 20 losses and 6 ties. For the first time in the club's history Fire finished the season with zero road wins (0–12–5). Twenty losses in a season became the highest in the club's history.

=== Final years in Bridgeview, Illinois (2016–2019) ===
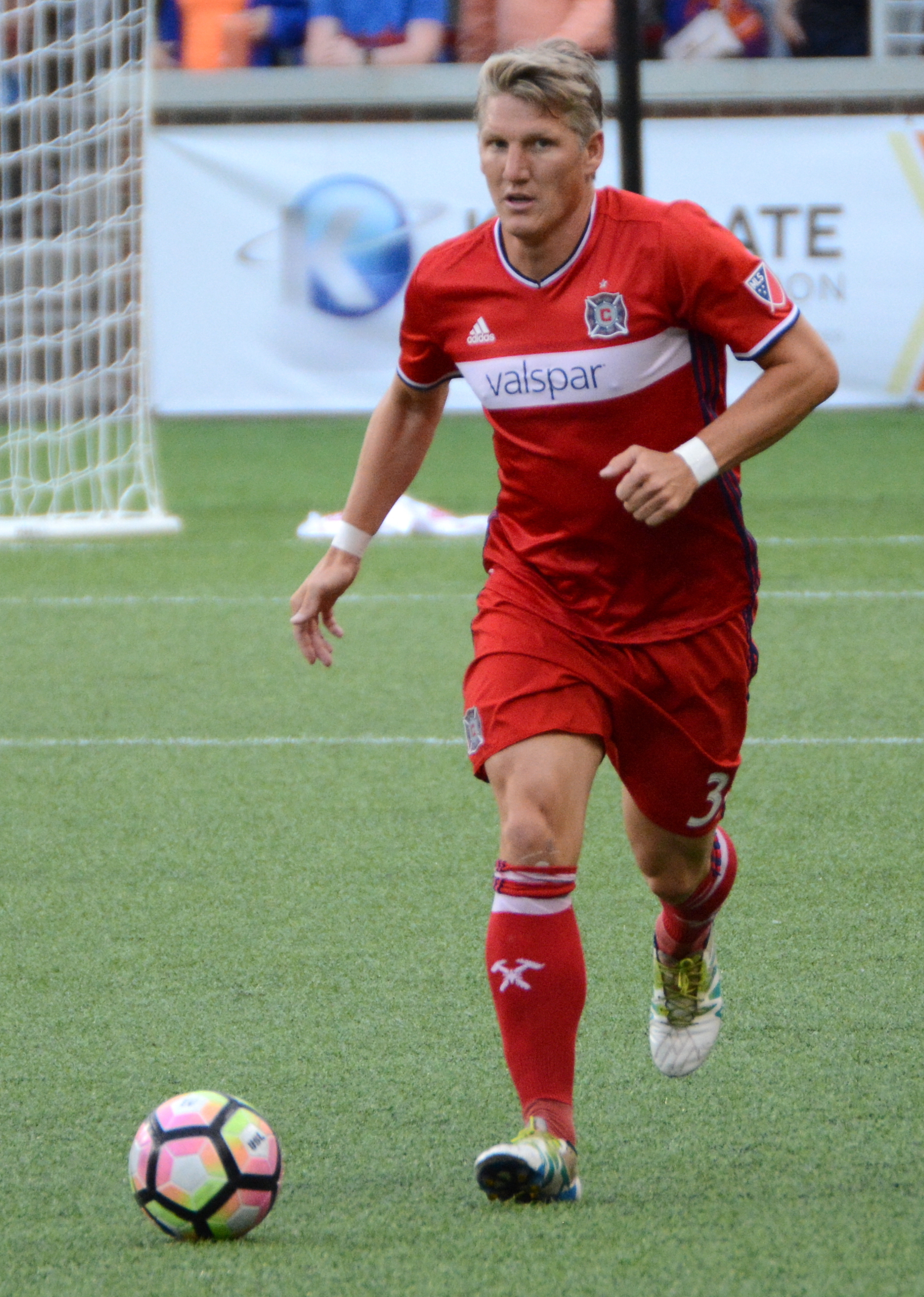
Bastian Schweinsteiger played for Chicago from 2017 to 2019

On November 18, 2015, Rodriguez made his first moves as GM, firing most of Yallop's remaining technical staff, including goalkeeping coach Aron Hyde, fitness coach Adrian Lamb and Director of Scouting Trevor James. Rodriguez also parted ways with the club's long-time Director of First Team Operations Ron Stern, Equipment Manager Charles Raycroft and Assistant Equipment Manager Allan Araujo. On November 24, 2015, the club announced that Veljko Paunovic, former coach of the Serbian U-20 side that won the 2015 FIFA U-20 World Cup, had been named the new head coach of the Chicago Fire. On January 5, 2016, technical director Brian Bliss also departed the Fire to join Sporting Kansas City as Director of Player Personnel, completing the total overhaul of the technical staff.

On March 21, 2017 Manchester United allowed Bastian Schweinsteiger to join Chicago Fire, subject to a medical and a visa being secured. The move from Manchester United was completed on March 29, 2017.

On July 11, 2018, the club announced that Hauptman had sold a 49 percent stake of his ownership to Joe Mansueto, the founder of Morningstar, Inc. On September 13, 2019, Hauptman sold his majority share to Mansueto, who became the sole owner.

=== Return to Soldier Field and rebrand (2020–present) ===
As the 2019 MLS campaign concluded, the Chicago Fire organization began the ambitious process of reinventing the franchise during the course of a three-month offseason. The changes included securing a downtown Chicago venue, adding new front office positions, shifting organizational roles, making major roster changes, and rolling out a new brand identity.

Two days after the end of the season, October 8, the Fire officially announced they would return to Soldier Field to play the 2020 MLS season, that same day Bastian Schweinsteiger announced his retirement. Two days later, the Fire announced the signing of midfielder Álvaro Medrán; eight days later Designated Player and former Golden Boot winner Nemanja Nikolić announced he would be leaving the team.

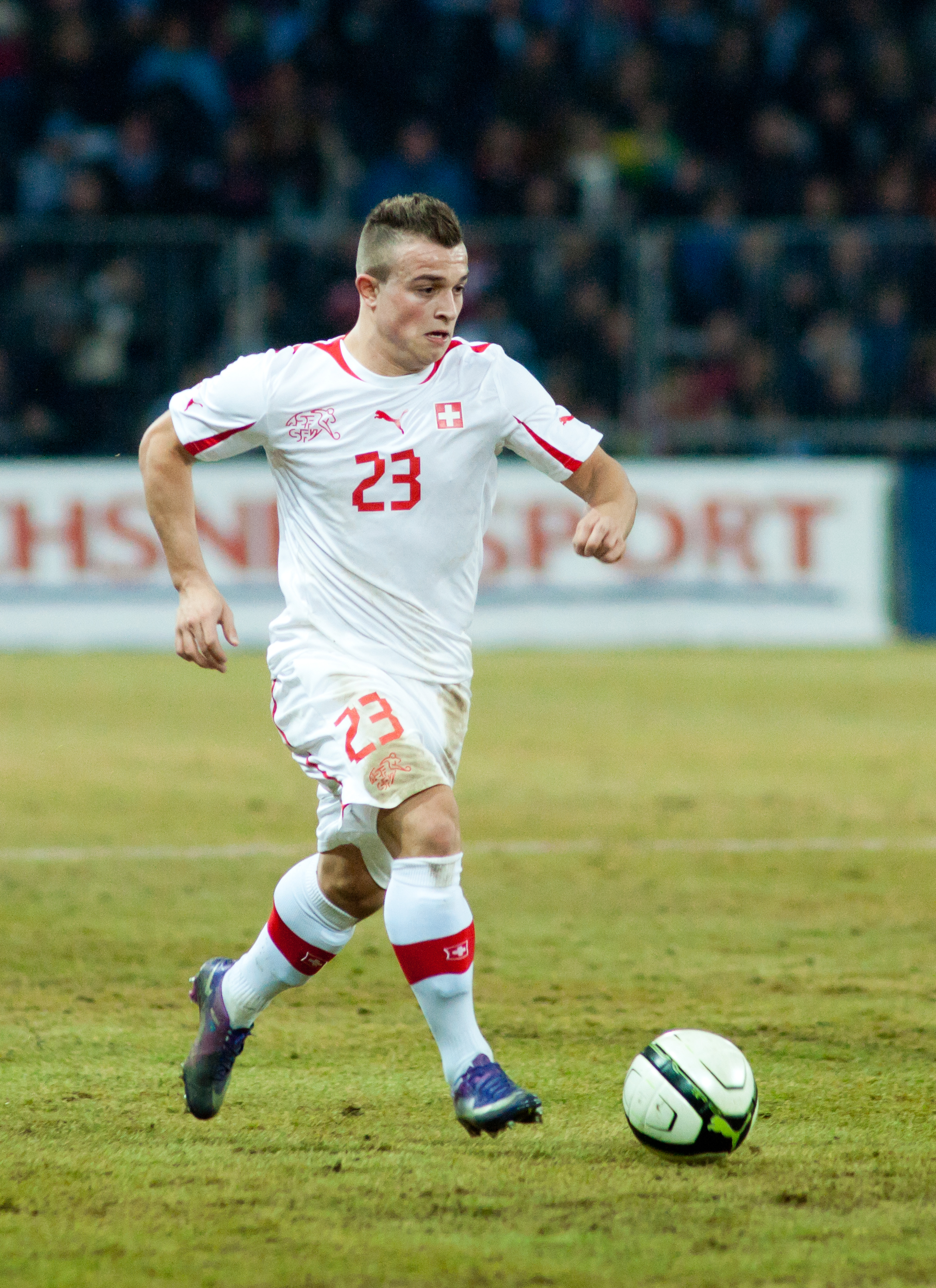
Xherdan Shaqiri's signing was the most expensive in Chicago Fire history ($7.5 million).

The first full month of the off-season saw the Fire continue their overhaul. On November 4, the team traded captain Dax McCarty to expansion side Nashville SC. Ten days later Homegrown Player Grant Lillard was dealt to MLS's other expansion team Inter Miami CF. That same day, November 14, Chicago Fire President and general manager Nelson Rodríguez fired head coach Veljko Paunović and his staff. News that the Chicago Fire would not be renewing the contract of their last-remaining DP, Nicolás Gaitán, as well as winger Aleksandar Katai was overshadowed by an even larger organizational unveiling one week later.

On November 21, the long-anticipated rebrand of the Chicago Fire franchise was announced. Developed with the help of marketing agency Doubleday & Cartwright, the team revealed changes to its franchise colors, red and white to red, blue, and gold, its name from Chicago Fire Soccer Club to Chicago Fire FC and, most contentiously, its logo.

While the Fire organization made their second player acquisition of the offseason in early December, homegrown player Nicholas Slonina, a relatively quiet few weeks had some followers of the team concerned about their organizational progress. However the Fire were busy again in late December with Nelson Rodríguez relinquishing his on-field decision making responsibilities to new Sporting Director Georg Heitz, who swiftly named former US Soccer Youth National Coach Raphaël Wicky as head coach and Sebastian Pelzer as Technical Director. Heitz has previously worked with Wicky at Swiss club FC Basel and "worked closely" with Pelzer at his management consultancy business Heusler Werthmüller Heitz (HWH).

The Fire opened the 2020 campaign with the signings of Argentinian duo Ignacio Aliseda from Defensa and Gaston Giménez from Vélez Sarsfield, looking to bolster their squad after losing DP Nicolás Gaitán The Fire also announced the signing of Robert Berić from French outfit Saint-Étienne, who netted in his debut defeat against the Seattle Sounders FC (2–1).

Ahead of the 2026 Major League Soccer season, the club released an updated version of its official mobile app in partnership with YinzCam. The app, available on the Apple App Store and Google Play Store, introduced customizable navigation, an interactive matchday hub, and improved ticket purchasing and scanning features. The update was part of the club's efforts to expand its digital services and improve fan engagement and ticket management.

On June 29, 2026, it was announced that the Fire had signed Poland's all time appearance holder, goalscorer and Champions League winner Robert Lewandowski as a designated player on a deal through the 2027–28 season.

== Colors and badge ==
Chicago Fire crest (1997–2019)

The club's official primary colors are red, flag blue, deep blue, and white. Secondary colors such as navy blue, sky blue, gold, and black have also been used throughout the history of the Fire. The original logo of the Chicago Fire, used from 1997 to 2019, was derived from the Cross of Saint Florian, a common symbol for fire departments in the United States. A stylized "C" sat in the center, representing the city, similar to the logos of the Bears and Cubs. The six points in a ring around the center alluded to the stars in the Flag of Chicago, one of which commemorates the Great Chicago Fire of 1871. This style was chosen by the original general manager, Peter Wilt, to establish a timeless image evocative of both classic American sports (as in the logos of the NHL Original Six) and the traditions of European soccer.

Nike, the Fire's original equipment supplier, intended for the team to be named the Chicago Rhythm. The Rhythm identity featured a turquoise, black and green color scheme, and a logo adorned with a cobra. Team officials ignored Nike's work, and privately developed the Fire identity with the help of Adrenalin, Inc., a sports branding agency from Denver. The names "Chicago Blues" and "Chicago Wind" were also considered.

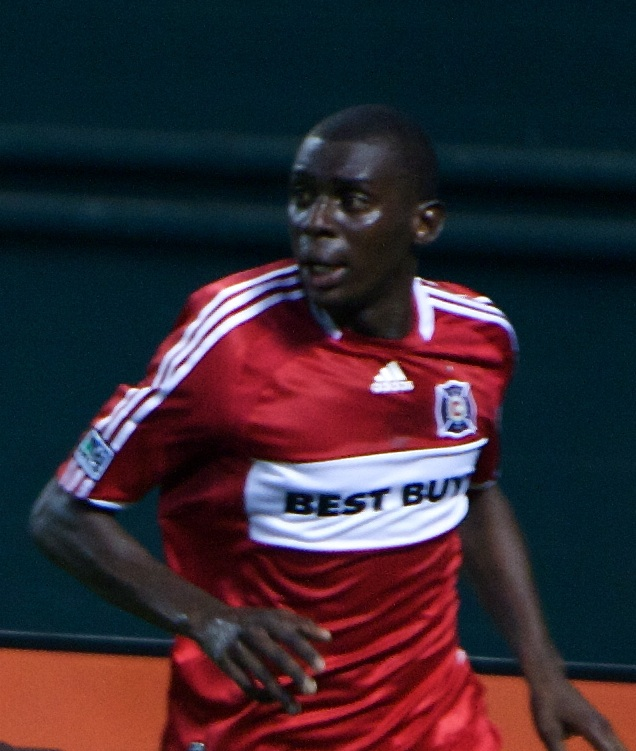
Bakary Soumaré wearing the all-red shirt with a white horizontal chest stripe. This was the club's primary kit until 2012.

The original Fire jerseys were chosen because of their resemblance to a Chicago fireman's coat, featuring broad horizontal stripes across the torso and sleeves. In the first year, the home jersey was red and white with a silver "FIRE" on the stripe; while the away shirts were white and black in the same style. The jersey maintained the same format of an all-red shirt with a white horizontal chest stripe through changes in equipment sponsor (from Nike, to Puma, and currently Adidas), until 2012 when the white stripe was exchanged for a blue stripe. Conversely, the Fire's secondary shirts have changed much over the years from white with black, to white with navy, to white with red, to all-white style and the all-blue currently used. Third shirts have often been yellow (originally to honor the Chicago Sting, later for the expired partnership with Morelia). In 2005, and again from 2014 through 2016, the club wore third shirts with designs based on the Flag of Chicago.

The club and their fans make frequent use of the symbols of Chicago, as a show of civic pride. Most prominent are the six-pointed Chicago stars, but the light blue color associated with the city, the municipal device, and the city skyline appear regularly on materials produced by the club and its fans. The Flag of Chicago is also favored by fans and often seen at the stadium.

On November 21, 2019, the club unveiled its first major rebranding ahead of their move back to Soldier Field in Chicago. The club's name was changed to Chicago Fire Football Club (Chicago Fire FC) and the original logo was replaced with an ovular crest marked with mirrored sets of three triangles called the "Fire Crown" to reference the revitalization of Chicago following the Great Fire. The crest used dark blue, red, and gold as its main colors. Secondary design colors are to be ivory and "flag blue", a light blue color derived from the Chicago flag. Before its unveiling, the rebranding was leaked onto social media and garnered an "overwhelmingly negative response" from fans. Comparisons were made between the "Fire Crown" and the existing logo of the Vancouver Whitecaps FC, which uses a similar set of mirrored triangles, and some fans worried that the "Fire Crown" was reminiscent of the logo of the Latin Kings street gang. The team responded to the decidedly negative reaction by saying "[new] brands take time and repetition to build meaning. They will be judged in years, not days", insisting that there are no plans to revive the old logo. The club ultimately unveiled a new crest in the middle of the 2021 season, with a full embrace of it beginning in 2022. This new logo was designed by Matthew Wolff.

=== Uniform history ===
1998-1999	2000-2002	2003-2004	2006-2007	2008–2009	2010-2011	2012–2013	2014–2015	2020	2021–2022	2022–2023	2024–2025

=== Sponsorship ===
Seasons	Kit manufacturer	Shirt sponsor
1998–2002	Nike	—
2003–2005	Puma	—
2006–2007	Adidas	—
2008–2010	Adidas	Best Buy
2011	Adidas	—
2012–2015	Adidas	Quaker Oats
2016–2018	Adidas	Valspar
2019–2022	Adidas	Motorola
2023	Adidas	—
2024–present	Adidas	Carvana

== Stadium ==
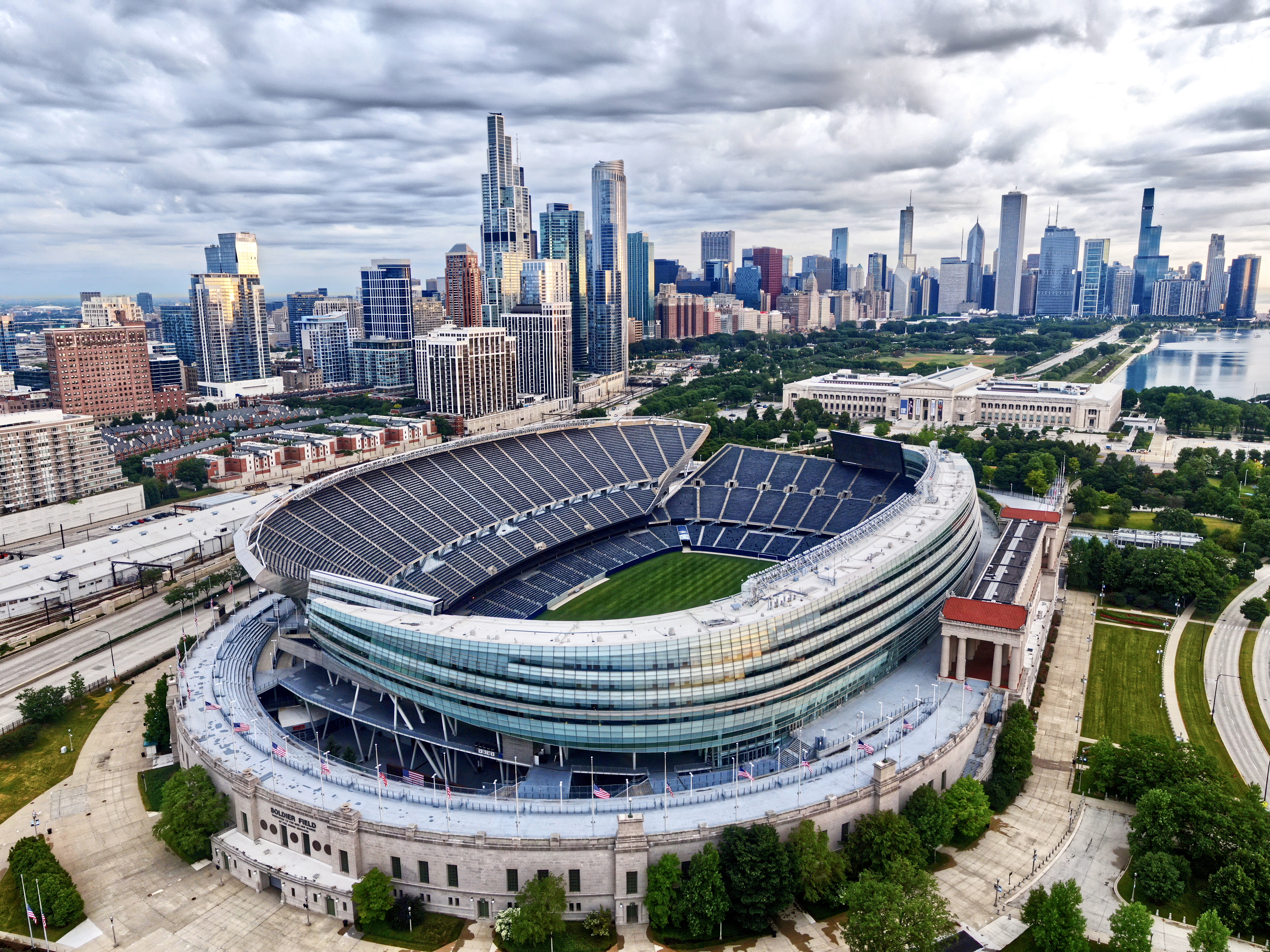
Soldier Field

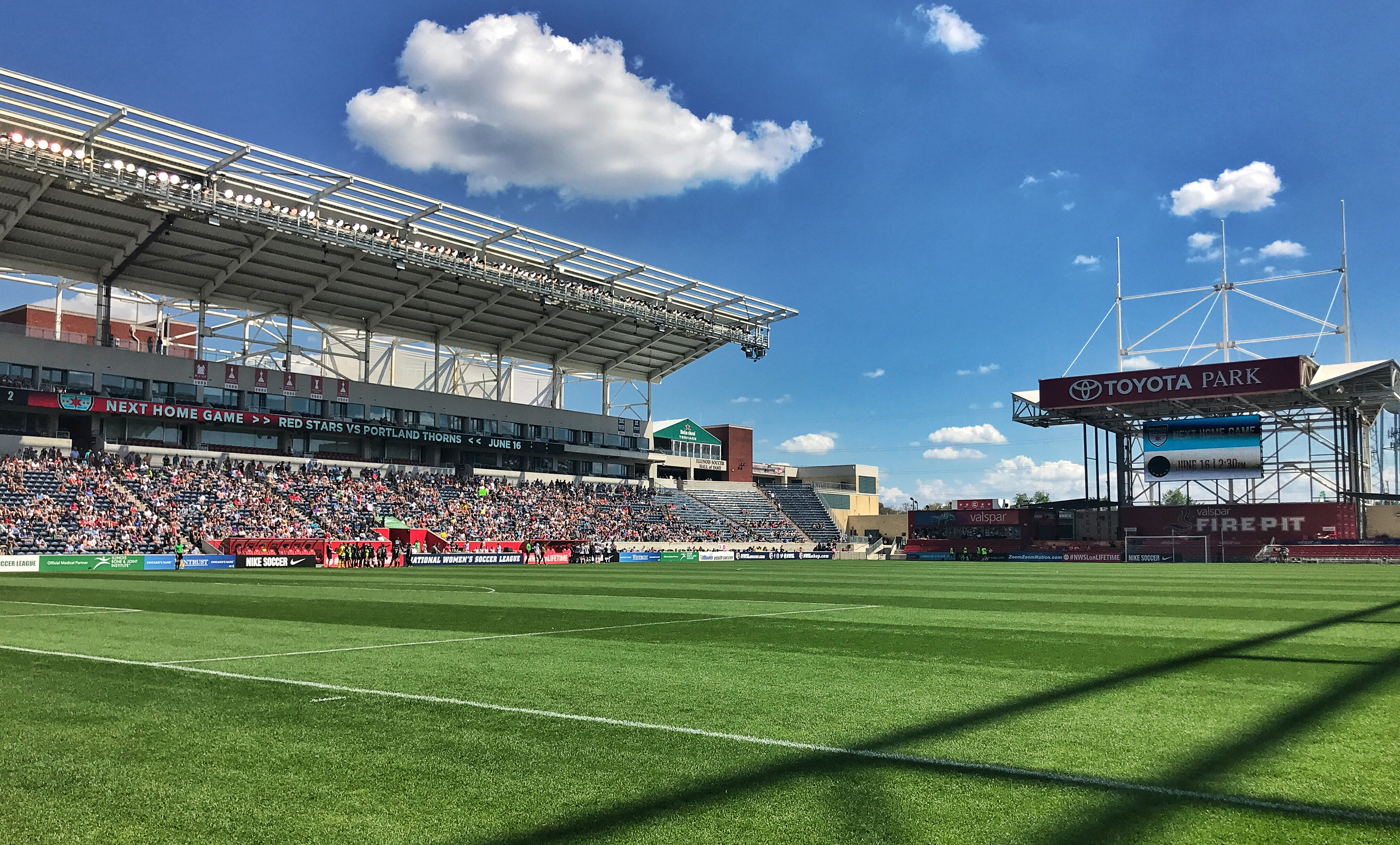
SeatGeek Stadium, located in Bridgeview, Illinois, was the club's home stadium from 2006 until 2019

Chicago played its home games at SeatGeek Stadium, a soccer-specific stadium located at 71st Street and Harlem Avenue in the Chicago suburb of Bridgeview, Illinois, about 12 miles southwest from downtown Chicago from 2006 until the end of the 2019 season. The Village of Bridgeview owns and operates SeatGeek Stadium, which opened as Toyota Park on June 11, 2006, and originally cost approximately $100 million. After the end of the 2018 season, It was renamed from Toyota Park to SeatGeek Stadium, with an estimated naming rights fee between $2.5 million to $4 million per year.

For its first years in the league the Fire played at Soldier Field, the 61,500-capacity home of the Chicago Bears of the NFL and one of the main venues of the 1994 FIFA World Cup. While that stadium was undergoing a $632 million renovation, the Fire played at Cardinal Stadium in Naperville, Illinois, on the outskirts of the Chicago metropolitan area; the stadium was temporarily expanded to 15,000 seats to accommodate the team. Attempts to play at other venues, including Comiskey Park and the Arlington Park racecourse, were rejected by their respective owners. They returned to Soldier Field toward the end of 2003, remaining there through the end of 2005 while their soccer-specific stadium was under construction.

In April 2019, multiple sources reported the club in negotiations with Bridgeview to buy out the remainder of its lease at SeatGeek Stadium and return to Soldier Field. In July 2019, Chicago Fire reached a deal to leave SeatGeek Stadium for a payment of $65.5 million and move back to Soldier Field starting in 2020. The return to Soldier Field was finalized with an agreement with the Chicago Park District in September 2019. SeatGeek Stadium continues to be utilized by the team for certain matches due to the Bears' own CPD lease conditions, which disallow any event in the five days before or after a Bears game to maintain turf quality and allow proper game preparation, including a 2025 playoff series against Philadelphia Union.

On June 3, 2025, Chicago Fire FC owner Joe Mansueto announced plans for a new, privately funded, soccer-specific McDonald's Park and entertainment district located along the Chicago River just south of Roosevelt Road. The stadium will be the anchor tenant of The 78 – a mixed-use development that will eventually include restaurants, retail, office space, and residential buildings, along with green space and an extension of the Chicago Riverwalk.

=== Home stadiums ===
- Soldier Field; Chicago (1998–2001, 2003–2005, 2020–present)
- Cardinal Stadium; Naperville, Illinois (2002–2003, one U.S. Open Cup game in 2004)
- SeatGeek Stadium; Bridgeview, Illinois (2006–2019, 2020–present for Bears conflicts)

=== Other stadiums ===
- Forest View Park; Arlington Heights, Illinois (2000) 1 game in U.S. Open Cup
- The Rock Sports Complex; Franklin, Wisconsin (2001) 1 game in U.S. Open Cup
- McCully Field; Wheaton, Illinois (2001) 1 game in U.S. Open Cup
- Shea Stadium, Peoria, Illinois (2008, 2011) 2 games in U.S. Open Cup Qualifying

== Club culture ==
=== Supporters ===
There is a noteworthy fan culture for the Fire, beginning with the original Fire SG Barn Burners, existing from the date the club was founded, and building on an enthusiasm throughout Chicago sports. At matches, supporters and ultras groups occupy a standing area directly behind the north goal, in the Harlem End of Toyota Park. This area is referred to as Section 8, originating from the numbering of the corresponding section at Soldier Field and the American military designation of mentally unfit soldiers. Section 8 Chicago, the Independent Supporters' Association (ISA) for the Fire, oversees the activities of these numerous groups. While incorporating a worldwide variety of styles with a Chicago bent, groups as part of Section 8 generally fall under the ultras designation. Additionally, an associated spinoff group called "Sector Latino" which originally congregated in the corner-kick Section 101 at the stadium's southwest end until season long discussions between the ISA and the Chicago Fire Front Office eventually saw the group moved to Section 137, directly behind the south goal. There are also several other affiliated ultras and supporters groups, including The Arsonists, Banter Buddies, Blitzer Mob, Husaria, Fire Ultras 98, Partisans, Red Scare, Second City North, The Western Front, Ultras Red-Side, Mike Ditka Street Crew (MDSC), and Whiskey Brothers Aught-Five. The Section 8 Chicago ISA is a registered 501(c)7 non-profit organization run by volunteers through an elected board of directors.

"Section 8", the supporters area at SeatGeek Stadium

Match atmosphere is known for organized displays of stadium-wide support, particularly for matches of prime competitive importance. Call-and-response cheering amongst the crowd is commonplace. Fans at SeatGeek Stadium for Fire matches periodically choreograph tifo presentations both to show their pride and inspire the players on the field. SeatGeek Stadium remains one of the few American environments to conduct such fan-driven presentations on a large scale.

=== Mascot ===
Their official mascot is Sparky, an anthropomorphic Dalmatian dog. Sparky is usually shown wearing the club's jersey but also arrives wearing firefighter attire.

=== Rivalries ===
While the Fire have rivalries with a number of different MLS teams, Fire supporters of different ages will likely give different responses as to who the club's main rival is. The earliest Fire supporters would list Brimstone Cup rival FC Dallas as the Fire's nemesis, or the Los Angeles Galaxy following heated playoff and cup matches with Dallas and L.A. in the league's early years.

After the Fire moved to the Eastern Conference, meetings with Dallas and LA became less frequent. Rivalries with D.C. United and New England Revolution were stoked following several thrilling playoff meetings. The Fire and Revolution are MLS' most frequent playoff matchup, meeting in the MLS Cup Playoffs 8 different times in 10 seasons from 2000 to 2009, splitting those encounters 4–4, with the Fire winning in 2000, 2003, 2008, and 2009. New England ended the Fire's playoff runs in 2002, 2005, 2006, and 2007. Newer rivals include Columbus Crew, who up until the introduction of FC Cincinnati were the closest MLS team geographically to the Fire, and Atlanta United FC following quarrels between the two sets of fans.

In 2023 St. Louis City SC entered the league. As St. Louis and Chicago are considered historic rival cities, a rivalry has naturally emerged between the two teams.

== Broadcasting ==
Beginning with the 2020 season, WGN Sports was added as a regional television rightsholder under a multi-year deal, with all regional matches airing on WGN-TV. The first season under the contract was concurrent with the final year of the existing ESPN+ regional rights. WGN had recently lost its legacy professional sports rights to NBC Sports Chicago and Marquee Sports Network. In April 2021, the club announced that their television broadcast team would consist of play-by-play commentator Tyler Terens, color analyst, Tony Meola. Play-by-play commentator Arlo White – whose Fire broadcast debut was postponed in 2020 because of the pandemic – was also expected to call several games. With every MLS game available on Apple TV via their rights deal in 2023, Chicago games will be broadcast almost exclusively on this service, with exceptions for certain national linear television broadcast partners.

Spanish-language radio station WRTO has aired Chicago Fire matches since 2017, replacing WEBG-HD2.

On April 26, 2023, the Fire announced a deal with Cumulus Media to carry Fire matches on English language radio, with matches to be broadcast on either WLS 890 am, or on the station's website at wlsam.com. Max Thoma will provide play-by-play with former Fire player Dasan Robinson providing color commentary.

== Players ==
=== Roster ===
As of September 4, 2026

Note: Flags indicate national team as defined under FIFA eligibility rules; some limited exceptions apply. Players may hold more than one non-FIFA nationality.

No.	Pos.	Nation	Player
1	GK	USA	Chris Brady
2	DF	POR	Leonardo Barroso
3	DF	ENG	Jack Elliott (Captain)
4	DF	RSA	Mbekezeli Mbokazi
5	DF	USA	Sam Rogers
6	MF	SWE	Anton Salétros
7	MF	SUI	Maren Haile-Selassie
9	FW	POL	Robert Lewandowski
10	MF	POR	André Franco
11	FW	DEN	Philip Zinckernagel
12	FW	RSA	Puso Dithejane
15	DF	USA	Andrew Gutman
17	MF	FIN	Robin Lod
18	FW	USA	Johan Gómez

No.	Pos.	Nation	Player
19	FW	CIV	Jonathan Bamba
21	DF	NOR	Andreas Hanche-Olsen
22	MF	USA	Mauricio Pineda
23	MF	GEO	Anzor Mekvabishvili
24	DF	USA	Jonathan Dean
25	GK	USA	Jeffrey Gal
28	FW	USA	Dean Boltz
29	MF	USA	David Poreba
32	DF	GRE	Noah Allen (on loan from Inter Miami)
35	MF	USA	Sergio Oregel
37	MF	USA	Robert Turdean
42	MF	CIV	Djé D'Avilla
44	GK	USA	Josh Cohen

=== Out on loan ===
Note: Flags indicate national team as defined under FIFA eligibility rules; some limited exceptions apply. Players may hold more than one non-FIFA nationality.

No.	Pos.	Nation	Player
14	DF	SRB	Viktor Radojević (on loan to CF Montréal)
26	FW	GUY	Omari Glasgow (on loan to Monterey Bay FC)
27	MF	USA	Dylan Borso (on loan to Greenock Morton)

No.	Pos.	Nation	Player
38	DF	USA	Christopher Cupps (on loan to Greenock Morton)
47	MF	USA	Sam Williams (on loan to Colorado Springs Switchbacks)

== Ring of Fire ==
The "Ring of Fire" was established in 2003 by Chicago Fire Soccer Club and the Chicago Fire Alumni Association as permanent tribute to honor those who have made the club proud and successful over its history. Aside from the initial member Piotr Nowak, only "Ring of Fire" members can select new inductees, and no more than one can be selected any year. Names and numbers (if applicable) are prominently displayed inside SeatGeek Stadium.

There were no inductees in 2008, 2010, or 2011. In 2008, the members voted to honor two recently deceased fans (supporter leaders Dan Parry and Brandon Kitchens) but were overruled by the club chairman Andrew Hauptman. Parry and Kitchens were later made members of the Wall of Honor, a special recognition for Fire fans. In addition to Parry and Kitchens, the late Fire fans Euan McLean and Al Hack have been inducted into the Wall of Honor as of 2011. C.J. Brown was expected to be honored in 2011, but a new rule was established that inductees must have been away from the club for at least a calendar year. Brown, at the time an assistant head coach at Real Salt Lake, was officially inducted at the halftime ceremony during the home game vs. Real Salt Lake in Toyota Park on May 9, 2012.

On October 3, 2015, Ante Razov, the club's all-time leading scorer, became the eighth individual to be inducted into the club's Ring of Fire Hall of Fame. The ceremony took place on that day during the halftime of the regular season home match against New England Revolution. On February 10, 2024, former goalkeeper and current goalkeeping coach Zach Thornton was inducted into the Ring of Fire. The ceremony will be held on April 27 at Soldier Field during the match against Atlanta United.

- (Poland) 10 Piotr Nowak (inducted 2003)
- (United States) 41 Frank Klopas (inducted 2004)
- (Czech Republic) 5 Luboš Kubík (inducted 2005)
- (United States) Former general manager and club president Peter Wilt (inducted 2006)
- (United States) Former head coach Bob Bradley (inducted 2007)
- (United States) 14 Chris Armas (inducted 2009)
- (United States) 2 C.J. Brown (inducted 2012)
- (United States) 9 Ante Razov (inducted 2015)
- (United States) 18 Zach Thornton (inducted 2024)

== Staff ==
=== Head coaches ===
Name	Nationality	Tenure
Bob Bradley	United States	October 30, 1997 – October 5, 2002
Dave Sarachan	United States	November 4, 2002 – June 20, 2007
Denis Hamlett (interim)	Costa Rica	June 20, 2007 – June 30, 2007
Juan Carlos Osorio	Colombia	July 1, 2007 – December 10, 2007
Denis Hamlett	Costa Rica	January 11, 2008 – November 24, 2009
Carlos de los Cobos	Mexico	January 1, 2010 – May 30, 2011
Frank Klopas (interim)	United States	May 30, 2011 – November 3, 2011
Frank Klopas	United States	November 3, 2011 – October 30, 2013
Frank Yallop	Canada	October 31, 2013 – September 20, 2015
Brian Bliss (interim)	United States	September 20, 2015 – November 24, 2015
Veljko Paunović	Serbia	November 24, 2015 – November 13, 2019
Raphaël Wicky	Switzerland	December 27, 2019 – September 30, 2021
Frank Klopas (interim)	United States	September 30, 2021 – November 7, 2021
Ezra Hendrickson	Saint Vincent and the Grenadines	November 24, 2021 – May 8, 2023
Frank Klopas (interim)	United States	May 8, 2023 – December 5, 2023
Frank Klopas	United States	December 5, 2023 – October 19, 2024
Gregg Berhalter	United States	October 20, 2024 – Present

=== Club presidents ===
Name	Tenure
Robert Sanderman	1997–2000
Peter Wilt	2001–2005
John Guppy	2005–2008
Javier León (interim)	2008
Dave Greeley	2008–2010
Javier León (interim)	2010
Julian Posada	2010–2012
Nelson Rodríguez	2018–2021
Ishwara Glassman-Chrein	2021–2022
Dave Baldwin	2023–present

=== Sporting Directors ===
Name	Tenure
Peter Wilt	1997–2005
Nelson Rodríguez	2015–2019
Georg Heitz	2019–2024
Gregg Broughton	2024-Present

=== Chief Operating Officer (General Manager) ===
Name	Tenure
John Urban	2018–2024
Zayne Thomajan	2024–Present

=== Technical directors ===
- Frank Klopas (2008–2011)
- Brian Bliss (December 6, 2013 – January 5, 2016)
- Sebastian Pelzer (December 28, 2019 – November 23, 2024)

=== Directors of player personnel ===
- Mike Jeffries (2010–2012)

=== Assistant coaches ===
- Denis Hamlett (1998–2007)
- Mike Jeffries (1998–2000, 2008–2009)
- Frank Klopas (2000)
- Daryl Shore (2000–2009)
- Tom Soehn (2001–2003)
- Craig Reynolds (2004–2007)
- Chris Armas (2008–2009)
- Alvaro Briones (2010)
- Larry Sunderland (2010–2011)
- Mike Matkovich (2009–2010, 2012–2013)
- Leo Percovich (2011–2013)
- Aron Hyde (2010–2015)
- C. J. Brown (2013–2014)
- Clint Mathis (2014–2015)
- Marc Bircham (2015)
- Marko Mitrović (2015–2019)
- Eric Gehrig (2017–2019)
- Frank Klopas (2020–2023)
- David Zdrillic (2020–2021)
- Adin Brown (2020–2022)
- Junior Gonzalez (2022–2023)
- C. J. Brown (2022–2023)
- Zach Thornton (2022–)
- Paulo Nagamura (2024)
- Carlos García (2024)
- Filipe Çelikkaya (2025-2026)
- Tom Heinemann (2025-)
- Héctor Jiménez (2025-)
- Nico Estévez (2026-)

== Honors ==
Domestic
Competitions	Titles	Seasons
MLS Cup	1	1998
Supporters' Shield	1	2003
U.S. Open Cup	4	1998, 2000, 2003, 2006
Eastern Conference (Playoff)	1	2003
Eastern Conference (Regular Season)	1	2003
Western Conference (Playoff)	1	1998
Central Division	2	2000, 2001

Notes

- record

=== Awards ===
- MLS Team Fair Play Award: 2009
- MLS Wooden Spoon: 2015, 2016

== Records ==
=== Most appearances ===
Rank	Player	Career	MLS	Playoffs	Open Cup	CONCACAF	Other	Total
1	(United States) C. J. Brown	1998–2010	295	35	8	6	6	350
2	(United States) Logan Pause	2003–2014	286	14	9	4	4	317
3	(Costa Rica) Gonzalo Segares	2005–2009; 2010–2014	231	13	9	0	3	256
4	(United States) Chris Armas	1998–2007	214	29	6	5	0	254
5	(United States) Zach Thornton	1998–2006	215	31	6	1	0	253
6	(United States) Jesse Marsch	1998–2005	200	31	8	2	0	241
7	(United States) Patrick Nyarko	2008–2015	196	5	13	0	5	219
8	(United States) Chris Rolfe	2005–2009; 2012–2014	178	15	7	0	5	205

=== Top goalscorers ===
As of May 16, 2026

Rank	Player	Career	MLS	Playoffs	Open Cup	CONCACAF	Other	Total
1	(United States) Ante Razov	1998–2000; 2001–2004	76	10	6	3	0	95
2	(Hungary) Nemanja Nikolić	2017–2019	51	0	5	0	0	56
3	(United States) Chris Rolfe	2005–2009; 2012–2014	48	4	3	0	0	55
4	(Belgium) Hugo Cuypers	2024–2026	40	2	2	0	0	44
5	(United States) Josh Wolff	1998–2002	32	0	7	0	0	39
6	(Ghana) David Accam	2015–2017	33	0	5	0	0	38
7	(Ukraine) Dema Kovalenko	1999–2002	22	5	3	4	0	34
8	(Poland) Piotr Nowak	1998–2002	26	3	0	0	0	29
9	(Jamaica) Damani Ralph	2003–2004	22	1	4	1	0	28
9	(United States) Mike Magee	2013–2015	22	0	6	0	0	28

=== Year-by-year ===
This is a partial list of the last five seasons completed by the Fire. For the full season-by-season history, see List of Chicago Fire FC seasons.

Season	League											Position		Playoffs	USOC	Continental / other		Average attendance (Note: Average attendance include statistics from league matches only.)	Top goalscorer(s) (Note: Top goalscorer(s) includes all goals scored in League, MLS Cup playoffs, U.S. Open Cup, MLS is Back Tournament, Leagues Cup, CONCACAF Champions Cup, FIFA Club World Cup, and other competitive continental matches.)	
Season	Div	League	Pld	W	L	D	GF	GA	GD	Pts	PPG	Conf.	Overall	Playoffs	USOC	Continental / other		Average attendance	Player(s)	Goals
2021	MLS	1	34	9	18	7	36	54	−18	34	1.00	12th	22nd	DNQ	NH	DNQ		10,703	(Slovenia) Robert Berić	8
2022	MLS	1	34	10	15	9	39	48	−9	39	1.15	12th	24th	DNQ	R3	DNQ		15,848	(Colombia) Jhon Durán	8
2023	MLS	1	34	10	14	10	39	51	−12	40	1.18	13th	24th	DNQ	QF	Leagues Cup	R32	18,170	(Switzerland) Maren Haile-Selassie	6
2024	MLS	1	34	7	18	9	40	62	−22	30	0.88	15th	28th	DNQ	DNQ	Leagues Cup	GS	21,327	(Belgium) Hugo Cuypers	10
2025	MLS	1	34	15	11	8	68	60	+8	53	1.56	8th	13th	R1	QF	DNQ		23,450	(Belgium) Hugo Cuypers	21

== Team awards ==
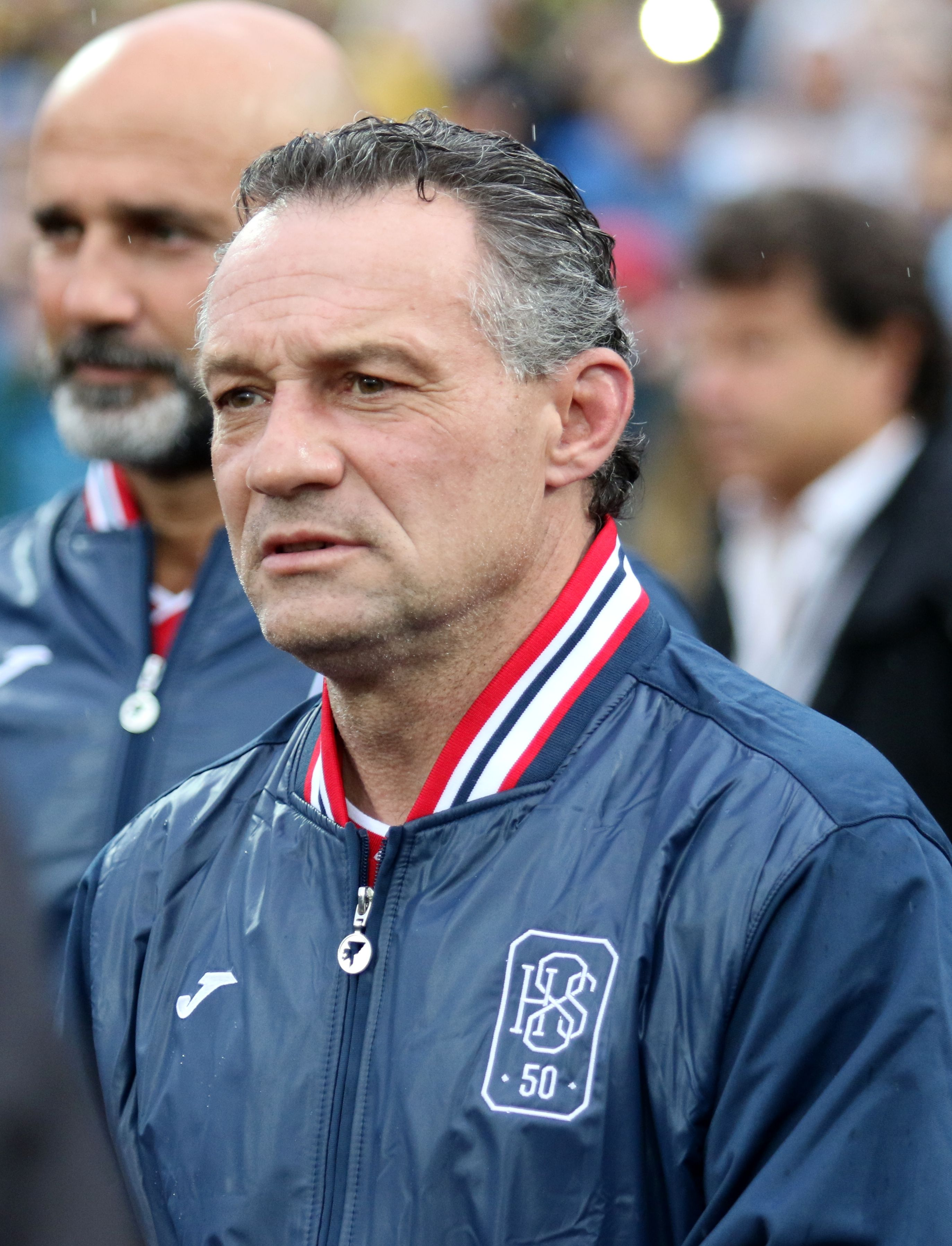
Piotr Nowak, the only three-time Fire MVP

As of December 6, 2025

Year	Team MVP	Golden Boot		Defender of the Year
Year	Team MVP	Winner	Goals	Defender of the Year
1998	(Poland) Piotr Nowak (1)	(United States) Ante Razov (1)	10	(Czech Republic) Luboš Kubík (1)
1999	(Czech Republic) Luboš Kubík	(United States) Ante Razov (2)	14	(Czech Republic) Luboš Kubík (2)
2000	(Poland) Piotr Nowak (2)	(United States) Ante Razov (3)	18	(United States) Carlos Bocanegra (1)
2001	(Poland) Piotr Nowak (3)	(United States) Eric Wynalda	10	(United States) Zach Thornton (1)
2002	(United States) Zach Thornton	(United States) Ante Razov (4)	14	(United States) Zach Thornton (2)
2003	(United States) Chris Armas	(United States) Ante Razov (5)	14	(United States) Carlos Bocanegra (2)
2004	(United States) Henry Ring	(Jamaica) Damani Ralph	11	(United States) Jim Curtin
2005	(Honduras) Iván Guerrero	(United States) Chris Rolfe (1)	8	(Honduras) Iván Guerrero
2006	(Costa Rica) Andy Herron	(Costa Rica) Andy Herron	9	(United States) CJ Brown (1)
2007	(Mexico) Cuauhtémoc Blanco	(United States) Chad Barrett	7	(Costa Rica) Gonzalo Segares
2008	(United States) Jon Busch	(United States) Chris Rolfe (2)	9	(Mali) Bakary Soumaré
2009	(United States) Brian McBride	(United States) Brian McBride	7	(Colombia) Wilman Conde
2010	(United States) Logan Pause	(Guatemala) Marco Pappa	7	(United States) CJ Brown (2)
2011	(Ghana) Dominic Oduro	(Ghana) Dominic Oduro	12	(United States) Cory Gibbs
2012	(United States) Chris Rolfe	(United States) Chris Rolfe (3)	8	(Germany) Arne Friedrich
2013	(United States) Mike Magee	(United States) Mike Magee	15	(United States) Sean Johnson (1)
2014	(United States) Sean Johnson	(United States) Quincy Amarikwa	8	(United States) Sean Johnson (2)
2015	(Ghana) David Accam (1)	(Ghana) David Accam (1)	10	(United States) Eric Gehrig
2016	(Ghana) David Accam (2)	(Ghana) David Accam (2)	9	(Netherlands) Johan Kappelhof (1)
2017	(Hungary) Nemanja Nikolić	(Hungary) Nemanja Nikolić (1)	24	(Netherlands) Johan Kappelhof (2)
2018	(Germany) Bastian Schweinsteiger	(Hungary) Nemanja Nikolić (2)	15	(Germany) Bastian Schweinsteiger (1)
2019	(United States) C.J. Sapong	(United States) C.J. Sapong	13	(Germany) Bastian Schweinsteiger (2)
2020	(Slovenia) Robert Berić	(Slovenia) Robert Berić (1)	12	(United States) Mauricio Pineda
2021	(Argentina) Federico Navarro	(Slovenia) Robert Berić (2) (Serbia) Luka Stojanović	8*	(Slovakia) Boris Sekulić
2022	(Switzerland) Xherdan Shaqiri	(Colombia) Jhon Durán	8	(Germany) Rafael Czichos
2023	(United States) Brian Gutiérrez	(Switzerland) Maren Haile-Selassie	6	(United States) Chris Brady (1)
2024	(Belgium) Hugo Cuypers	(Belgium) Hugo Cuypers (1)	10	(United States) Chris Brady (2)
2025	(Denmark) Philip Zinckernagel	(Belgium) Hugo Cuypers (2)	17	(England) Jack Elliott

Golden Boot is the team leader in goals (regular season games only). * Indicates a season where two players tied for the Golden Boot award.
