= John Guppy (businessman) =

American soccer marketing agency executive

John Guppy is the owner of Gilt Edge Soccer Marketing, a soccer-specific marketing agency.

== Career ==
Guppy was Executive VP of the MetroStars until 2005, when he was chosen by former Chicago Fire owners AEG to replace the popular Peter Wilt in Chicago—a move that resulted in substantial fan backlash and protest. He successfully managed the team's move from Soldier Field to Toyota Park in Bridgeview in 2006. and was recognized by Crains Business Magazine as one of Chicago's 40 under 40 important business leaders.

He was the president and CEO of the Fire until agreeing to part ways with new team owners, Andell Holdings, on April 11, 2008.

== Personal ==
John Guppy was born in Winchester, England. In 1970, he graduated from New Hampshire College (now Southern New Hampshire University), and in 1992, from the University of Massachusetts Amherst. He currently lives in Naperville, Illinois with his family.

John is also the cousin of former England national team midfielder Steve Guppy.
