= Peter Wilt =

American soccer executive

- Born: 1960 (age 64–65); Woodstock, Illinois
- Education: Marquette University
- Occupation(s): President and CEO of Chicago House AC
- Known for: Founding member of: Chicago Fire FC; Chicago Red Stars; Indy Eleven; National Independent Soccer Association; Forward Madison; Green Bay Voyageurs FC; Chicago House AC

Peter Wilt is an American soccer executive and founding president and general manager of the Chicago Fire in Major League Soccer (MLS). He contributed to the efforts to expand MLS to Milwaukee, Wisconsin, and has remained active in the soccer community in the Midwest, particularly in Chicago.

== History ==
Peter Wilt was born in Woodstock, Illinois and raised in McHenry, Illinois. He started his career in sports working for the Milwaukee Brewers and Milwaukee Admirals, before concentrating on soccer with the Milwaukee Wave.

Wilt gained a following for answering questions from fans through the BigSoccer Internet message boards and now maintains his own blog on Chicago soccer issues.

In his seven seasons as Chicago's GM, the Fire won one MLS Cup, three U.S. Open Cups and one Supporters' Shield. In 2005, Wilt was fired by Anschutz Entertainment Group, the team's owner. The following year, he became the chief executive officer of Milwaukee Professional Soccer, a group bidding to bring an MLS franchise to Milwaukee, but left the position to become CEO of the Chicago Red Stars of Women's Professional Soccer that started play in 2009. After one season with the Red Stars, Wilt departed for a front office position with the Milwaukee Wave. After one season with the Wave, Wilt founded the now-defunct expansion MISL side Chicago Riot.

In late 2012, Wilt partnered with a group of Indianapolis-based investors, headed by Ersal Ozdemir, to determine the ability of the market to support a North American Soccer League team in the city, with eventual hopes to join MLS. On January 16, 2013, the league awarded Indianapolis the league's twelfth franchise, naming Wilt team President. The team, known as Indy Eleven, began play in the 2014 season.

In January 2016, Wilt stepped down from his role with Indy Eleven to pursue establishing an NASL team in Chicago. He later announced that talks were in progress to secure both short-term and long-term stadium options, and was exploring partnerships with various potential investors and the potential of establishing a supporter ownership program.

On June 6, 2017, Wilt announced that the newly formed National Independent Soccer Association would begin play in 2018, starting with 8 to 10 teams, later revised to 8 to 12 teams. The league also outlined plans to introduce a promotion/relegation system once they reached their goal of standing up 24 teams, becoming the first league in US professional soccer to do so. The league would act as a feeder league to the North American Soccer League.

On May 17, 2018, Wilt left the NISA to assist standing up a future professional team in Madison, Wisconsin of the USL League One, later named Forward Madison FC. A committee of club owners was formed to elect new leadership within the organization. Wilt was also named the managing director of Green Bay Voyageurs FC, Forward Madison's affiliate in USL League Two.

On October 24, 2019, Forward Madison announced Wilt's departure from the club in order to take a role with the USL.

On September 10, 2020, the National Independent Soccer Association (NISA) announced that an investor group, led by Wilt, had applied for a club to play in the Chicago market.

On January 10, 2024, the Open Soccer Alliance was formed with Peter Wilt as chief strategic officer. The Alliance's stated goal is, "To unite advocates for an open system structure of professional and amateur soccer."
