= Benedetti–Wehrli Stadium =

Athletic facility at North Central College

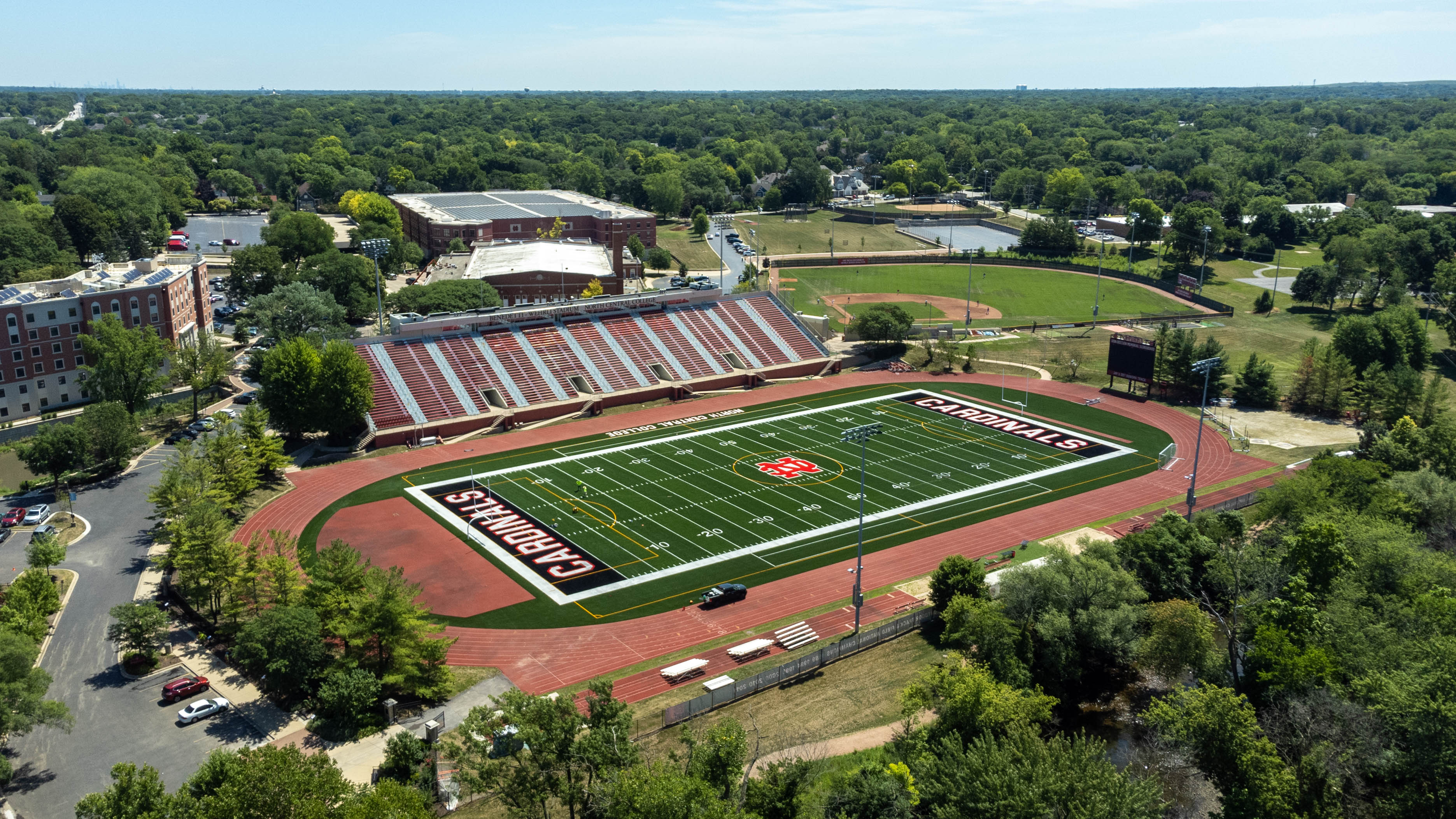
- Interactive map of Benedetti–Wehrli Stadium
- Location: Naperville, IL
- Coordinates: 41.770175°N 88.146121°W
- Owner: North Central College
- Capacity: 5,500

Construction
- Opened: September 11, 1999

Tenants
- North Central Cardinals (NCAA) (1999–present); Chicago Fire (MLS) (2002–2003)

Benedetti–Wehrli Stadium, formerly Cardinal Stadium, is a stadium in Naperville, Illinois. It is primarily used for American football, soccer and track and field and has a seating capacity of 5,500. It was home to Chicago Fire FC of Major League Soccer from 2002 to 2003.

== History ==
The athletic fields for North Central College, home to several NCAA Division III programs, were destroyed by a flood in July 1996 and were quickly repaired to allow the school's football team to play on a temporary field. Plans for a larger renovation of the football stadium and adjacent athletics facility were announced in January 1997, but later replaced with the development of a new complex anchored by a 5,000-seat football and soccer stadium. The $6.5 million complex included the new football stadium, indoor training facilities, a 750-seat baseball stadium, and a track-and-field stadium.

The new stadium opened for a Cardinals football game on September 11, 1999, and initially retained its former name of Kroehler Field before being renamed Cardinal Stadium. The track-and-field area opened the following year and hosted the NCAA Division III men's outdoor track and field championships in May 2000. The natural grass playing surface was replaced with artificial turf in September 2001 due to the stadium's frequent events. Cardinal Stadium was renamed Benedetti–Wehrli Stadium in 2003 for two North Central College alumni and board members, Albert Benedetti and Richard Wehrli.

== Tenants and events ==
Benedetti–Wehrli hosts two highly hyped high school football games featuring Naperville Central High School versus Naperville North High School and Waubonsie Valley High School versus Neuqua Valley High School. The stadium also serves as host to a competitive drum corps show hosted by The Cavaliers Drum and Bugle Corps of Rosemont, Ill., each summer.

In 2018, the stadium became the home field for the Chicago Wildfire of the American Ultimate Disc League.

=== Chicago Fire ===
The Chicago Fire, a Major League Soccer team, played their home matches at Cardinal Stadium in 2002 and 2003 while Soldier Field underwent extensive renovations. The team had inquired with several venues in the Chicago area, including Comiskey Park and the Arlington Park racecourse, and agreed to play at Cardinal Stadium in January 2002. They had previously used the stadium for the quarterfinals of the 2000 U.S. Open Cup, which drew 7,096 spectators.

To accommodate the team's larger crowds, temporary seating was installed in phases, beginning with bleachers behind the goals in time for the regular season opener. The first match, played without these bleachers, was a CONCACAF Champions' Cup match on March 20 against C.S.D. Municipal of Guatemala that had 4,844 spectators. The regular season opener on April 27 had over 10,000 in attendance; the Fire also ran shuttle buses from remote parking areas. An additional stand on the west side of the stadium opened on May 26 against the San Jose Earthquakes and drew 13,521 spectators—the team's first full sellout at Cardinal Stadium. Additional seats opened up in the following months to bring the stadium's temporary capacity up to 15,000, close to the Fire's average attendance of 16,325 at Soldier Field the previous year.

The Fire finished the 2002 regular season with an average of 12,922 spectators at Cardinal Stadium, including four consecutive sellouts in September. The stadium's small footprint allowed fans to be closer to the field and created an "intimate" atmosphere compared to Soldier Field; the team's lease was renewed in September 2002 by the Naperville City Council. Cardinal Stadium's artificial turf surface, as well as its narrow dimensions, was subject to criticism by players and coaches. The temporary seating was removed during the offseason and gradually re-added at the start of the 2003 season, which began with a standing room only crowd of 7,143 at the opener on April 13. The Fire's final match at Cardinal Stadium was played on October 4 against the Los Angeles Galaxy with 11,874 in attendance; they averaged 11,601 in the 14 matches played at the stadium during the 2003 regular season and drew 331,989 total fans over 20 months. The team returned to the reopened Soldier Field for the final two matches of the regular season and the MLS Cup Playoffs.

Preceded by Soldier Field	Home of the Chicago Fire; 2002 – 2003	Succeeded by Soldier Field
