= Chris Rolfe =

American soccer player (born 1983)

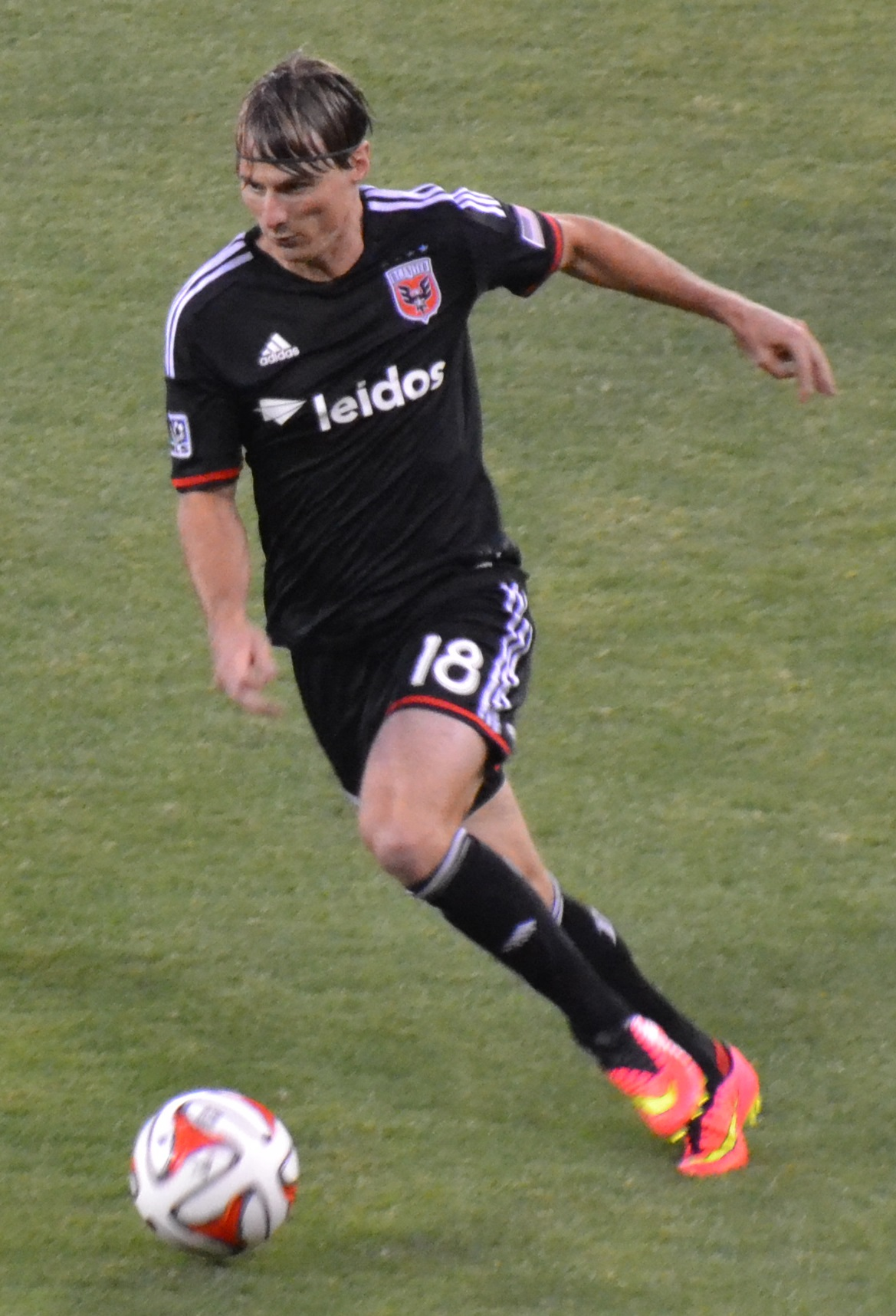
- Rolfe playing for DC United in 2014

Personal information
- Date of birth: January 17, 1983 (age 43)
- Place of birth: Kettering, Ohio, U.S.
- Height: 5 ft 8 in (1.73 m)
- Positions: Forward; winger

Youth career
- Fairmont Firebirds

College career
Years	Team	Apps	(Gls)
2001–2004	Dayton Flyers		

Senior career*
Years	Team	Apps	(Gls)
2003–2004	Chicago Fire Premier	18	(9)
2005–2009	Chicago Fire	123	(36)
2010–2012	AaB	35	(6)
2012–2014	Chicago Fire	55	(12)
2014–2017	D.C. United	61	(16)
Total		292	(79)

International career
2005–2009	United States	10	(0)
- * Club domestic league appearances and goals

Chris Rolfe (born January 17, 1983) is an American former professional soccer player. Playing both as a forward and winger, Rolfe primarily played for the Chicago Fire of Major League Soccer, in addition to spending time in the Danish Superliga, before joining D.C. United later in his career. He also earned 10 caps for the United States during his career. He has been the director of operations with the University of Notre Dame men's soccer program since July 2019.

== Club career ==
=== High school and college ===
Rolfe attended Kettering Fairmont High School, where he was given his first varsity start as a freshman in the last game of the season in order to play with his brother Jon, a senior. Set the goal scoring record in only 3 years on Varsity. Earned All-State and All-Midwest honors in his senior year after leading the Firebirds to their first district title and first-ever victory over arch-rival Centerville High School. He played college soccer at the University of Dayton.

Despite missing most of his final two intercollegiate seasons due to injury, Rolfe continued to be a dynamic goal scorer and eventually set the school record for career assists (25). He was named an NSCAA All-American after his senior year with the Flyers. Rolfe also played for Chicago Fire Premier in the USL Premier Development League during the summers of 2003 and 2004, helping the Fire PDL team to the national championship game in 2003 and an undefeated season in 2004.

In 2010, Rolfe was inducted into the Ohio Soccer Hall of Fame for his accomplishments at the prep and college levels in the state of Ohio.

=== Professional ===
Rolfe was drafted by the senior team in the third round of the 2005 MLS SuperDraft by Chicago Fire, and became a Chicago mainstay, scoring 30 goals in his first four seasons with the club, leading his team in goals with eight in his debut 2005 season, and winning the Lamar Hunt U.S. Open Cup in 2006. Since 2007, Rolfe was one of the Fire's top scorers, scoring 8 goals in the 2007 season and 9 goals in the 2008 season, including a hat-trick and man of the match performance versus the New York Red Bulls.

On September 2, 2009, it was announced that Rolfe had signed with Danish Superliga side Aalborg beginning January 1, 2010. Rolfe struggled at first in Denmark due to injuries, but came into form after recovering from his injuries, being named to the Superliga Best XI five weeks during his final year there.

On April 15, 2012, it was announced that Rolfe was returning to the Fire. Rolfe made his first-team debut with the Fire on June 2 coming on as a second-half substitute against the New England Revolution. Rolfe scored in his home re-debut match at Toyota Park on June 17 in a 3–1 win over the New York Red Bulls. He won the Chicago Fire MVP and Golden Boot for the 2012 season.

Rolfe was traded by Chicago to D.C. United on April 2, 2014, in exchange for allocation money.

Rolfe thrived in his first season at D.C. United, scoring a goal in his debut for D.C. United as a substitute in a 2–0 win against the New England Revolution, giving D.C. United their first win of the season. After scoring 6 goals and creating 6 assists in 21 games, Rolfe suffered a terrible arm injury on September 3, 2014, ending his season.

In 2015, Rolfe led D.C. United to the playoffs and was awarded the Team MVP award (his 2nd) and the Golden Boot Award (his 4th) for most goals scored (10). In the first round of the MLS Cup Playoffs, Rolfe scored the 2nd goal in a 2-1 come-from-behind win to push United into the MLS Eastern Conference Semi-final.

Rolfe suffered a concussion in a game against the Chicago Fire on April 30, 2016, when an inadvertent elbow struck him in the nose; he has not played since.

On November 9, 2017, after 18 months out of the game, Rolfe announced his retirement from professional soccer. In his career for DC, he recorded 61 games, scored 17 goals, and assisted 9 goals.

== International career ==
Rolfe made his debut with the United States national team on November 12, 2005, against Scotland at Hampden Park in Glasgow, and participated in the national team's annual January camp the following four years. He was named to the 2006 FIFA World Cup roster of 30. He represented his country in two World Cup qualifying games, helping the team qualify for the 2010 World Cup. The injury sustained in April 2010 in Denmark ruled him unfit for the 2010 FIFA World Cup.

== Personal life ==
Since being sidelined from soccer Rolfe has returned to the University of Dayton, near his home town of Kettering, Ohio, to complete his degree in finance that he started more than 16 years previously.

He has volunteered as assistant coach for the University of Denver women's program.

He has had an interest for organic farming, and volunteered at farms and farmers markets in Chicago, Washington and Denver.

== Career statistics ==
As of December 17, 2015

Appearances and goals by club, season and competition
Club	Season	League			Cup (Note: Includes US Open Cup, Danish Cup)		Play-offs (Note: Includes MLS Cup Playoffs)		Continental		Total	
Club	Season	Division	Apps	Goals	Apps	Goals	Apps	Goals	Apps	Goals	Apps	Goals
Chicago Fire	2005	MLS	29	8	2	0	3	0	–		34	8
Chicago Fire	2006	MLS	21	7	1	0	2	0	–		24	7
Chicago Fire	2007	MLS	19	6	0	0	3	2	–		22	8
Chicago Fire	2008	MLS	26	9	3	0	3	1	–		32	10
Chicago Fire	2009	MLS	28	6	1	0	3	1	–		32	7
Chicago Fire	Total		123	36	7	0	14	4	0	0	144	40
AaB	2009–10	Danish Superliga	7	1			–		–		7	1
AaB	2010–11	Danish Superliga	7	1			–		–		7	1
AaB	2011–12	Danish Superliga	21	4			–		–		21	4
AaB	Total		35	6			0	0	0	0	35	6
Chicago Fire	2012	MLS	22	8	0	0	1	0	–		23	8
Chicago Fire	2013	MLS	31	4	4	2			–		35	6
Chicago Fire	2014	MLS	2	0					–		2	0
Chicago Fire	Total		55	12	4	2	1	0	0	0	60	14
D.C. United	2014	MLS	21	6	1	0	2	0	–		24	6
D.C. United	2015	MLS	31	10	1	0	3	1	2	0	37	11
D.C. United	Total		52	16	2	0	5	1	2	0	61	17
Career total			265	70	13	2	20	5	2	0	300	77

== Honors ==
Chicago Fire

- U.S. Open Cup: 2006

Individual

- Chicago Fire: Golden Boot (top scorer) 2005, 2008, 2012
- Chicago Fire Team MVP: 2012
- D.C. United: Team MVP & Golden Boot (top scorer) 2015
