= 2012 Chicago Fire season =

Chicago Fire Soccer Club
2012 season
- Chairman: Andrew Hauptman
- Head coach: Frank Klopas
- Stadium: Toyota Park (capacity: 20,000)
- MLS: 6th overall (4th in the Eastern Conference)
- MLS Cup Playoffs: Knockout round
- U.S. Open Cup: Third round
- Carolina Challenge Cup: Runners-up
- Brimstone Cup: Winners
- Top goalscorer: Chris Rolfe (8 goals)
- Highest home attendance: 20,533 vs Los Angeles Galaxy (July 8)
- Lowest home attendance: 10,489 vs Houston Dynamo (April 15)
- Average home league attendance: 16,407 (regular season)
- Biggest win: CHI 3-1 NY (6/17); PHI 1-3 CHI (8/12); CHI 3-1 HOU (9/2)
- Biggest defeat: DC 4-2 CHI (8/22)
Home colors	Away colors

The 2012 Chicago Fire season was the club's 14th year of existence, as well as their 15th season in Major League Soccer and their 15th consecutive year in the top-flight of American soccer.

The Fire began the regular season with a 1–1 tie on March 17, 2012 when they were hosted by the expansion team Montreal Impact in their first Major League Soccer home game. The Men in Red concluded the regular season hosting D.C. United at the Toyota Park on October 27, 2012.

The Fire qualified for the MLS Cup Playoffs for the twelfth time in their fifteen competitive seasons and for the first time since 2009. The team was eliminated from the playoffs after a 1–2 home loss to Houston Dynamo in the Knockout Round match on October 31, 2012.

At the end of the season, Chicago Fire's defender, Austin Berry, has been awarded the 2012 MLS Rookie of the Year Award, while the club's captain Logan Pause has won the 2012 MLS Fair Play Award.

== Squad at the end of the season ==
As of October 31, 2012. Source: Chicago Fire Official Roster

No.	Name	Nationality	Position	Date of birth (aged)	Previous club
Goalkeepers
1	Jay Nolly	(United States)	GK	January 2, 1982 (aged 30)	(Canada) Vancouver Whitecaps FC
25	Sean Johnson	(United States)	GK	May 31, 1989 (aged 23)	(United States) Atlanta Blackhawks
70	Paolo Tornaghi	(Italy)	GK	June 21, 1988 (aged 24)	(Italy) F.C. Internazionale Milano
Defenders
3	Dan Gargan	(United States)	RB	December 14, 1982 (aged 29)	(Canada) Toronto FC
5	Cory Gibbs	(United States)	CB	January 14, 1980 (aged 32)	(United States) New England Revolution
6	Jalil Anibaba	(United States)	CB	October 19, 1988 (aged 24)	(United States) Carolina Dynamo
13	Gonzalo Segares	(Costa Rica)	LB	October 13, 1982 (aged 30)	(Cyprus) Apollon Limassol
20	Tony Walls	(United States)	RB	January 16, 1990 (aged 22)	(United States) University of Wisconsin–Green Bay
22	Austin Berry	(United States)	CB	June 6, 1988 (aged 24)	(United States) Louisville Cardinals
23	Arne Friedrich	(Germany)	CB	May 29, 1979 (aged 33)	(Germany) VfL Wolfsburg
28	Steven Kinney	(United States)	RB	October 28, 1987 (aged 25)	(United States) Carolina Dynamo
99	Hunter Jumper	(United States)	LB	February 28, 1989 (aged 23)	(United States) University of Virginia Cavaliers
Midfielders
4	Álvaro Fernández	(Uruguay)	M	October 11, 1985 (aged 27)	(United States) Seattle Sounders FC
11	Daniel Paladini	(United States)	M	November 11, 1984 (aged 27)	(United States) Carolina RailHawks FC
12	Logan Pause	(United States)	M	August 22, 1981 (aged 31)	(United States) North Carolina Tar Heels
15	Wells Thompson	(United States)	M	November 25, 1983 (aged 28)	(United States) Colorado Rapids
17	Pável Pardo	(Mexico)	M	July 26, 1976 (aged 36)	(Mexico) Club América
19	Corben Bone	(United States)	M	September 16, 1988 (aged 24)	(United States) Carolina Dynamo
21	Michael Videira	(United States)	M	January 6, 1986 (aged 26)	(United States) AC St. Louis
27	Victor Pineda	(United States)	M	March 15, 1993 (aged 19)	(United States) Chicago Fire Academy
71	Alex	(Brazil)	M	December 15, 1988 (aged 23)	(Switzerland) FC Wohlen
Forwards
7	Sherjill MacDonald	(Netherlands)	F	November 20, 1984 (aged 27)	(Belgium) Beerschot AC
8	Dominic Oduro	(Ghana)	F	August 13, 1985 (aged 27)	(United States) Houston Dynamo
10	Guillermo Franco	(Mexico)	F	November 3, 1976 (aged 35)	(Mexico) Pachuca
14	Patrick Nyarko	(Ghana)	F	January 15, 1986 (aged 26)	(United States) Virginia Tech Hokies
18	Chris Rolfe	(United States)	F	January 17, 1983 (aged 29)	(Denmark) Aalborg BK
94	Kellen Gulley	(United States)	F	April 6, 1994 (aged 18)	(United States) Chicago Fire Academy

== Player movement ==
=== Transfers ===
==== In ====
Date	Player	Position	Previous club	Fee/notes	Ref
December 5, 2011	(Israel) Orr Barouch	F	(Mexico) Tigres de la UANL	Purchased rights after loan, terms not disclosed	
December 5, 2011	(United States) Jay Nolly	GK	(Canada) Vancouver Whitecaps FC	Acquired in exchange for a first round selection in the 2013 MLS Supplemental Draft	
December 6, 2011	(United States) Logan Pause	M	(United States) Chicago Fire	Extended the contract through 2013, terms not disclosed	
January 9, 2012	(Colombia) Rafael Robayo	M	(Colombia) Millonarios	Signed, terms not disclosed	
January 11, 2012	(Uruguay) Federico Puppo	M	(Uruguay) Danubio F.C.	Signed, terms not disclosed	
January 12, 2012	(United States) Austin Berry	D	(United States) University of Louisville	Selected ninth overall in 2012 MLS SuperDraft, signed with MLS	
January 18, 2012	(Mexico) Pável Pardo	M	(United States) Chicago Fire	Re-signed for a two-year contract, terms not disclosed	
January 24, 2012	(Zimbabwe) Kheli Dube	F	(United States) New England Revolution	Signed on as free agent after being selected in Stage Two of the 2011 MLS Re-Entry Draft on December 12, 2011	
March 6, 2012	(United States) Hunter Jumper	D	(United States) University of Virginia Cavaliers	Signed after being selected 28th overall in 2012 MLS SuperDraft, terms not disclosed	
March 7, 2012	(Germany) Arne Friedrich	D	(Germany) VfL Wolfsburg	Signed, terms of the deal not disclosed	
March 7, 2012	(Italy) Paolo Tornaghi	GK	(Italy) F.C. Internazionale Milano	Signed, terms of the deal not disclosed	
March 15, 2012	(United States) Tony Walls	D	(United States) University of Wisconsin–Green Bay	Signed after being selected 47th overall in the 2012 MLS Supplemental Draft, terms not disclosed	
April 5, 2012	(Ghana) Patrick Nyarko	F	(United States) Chicago Fire	Re-signed, terms and length not disclosed	
April 17, 2012	(United States) Chris Rolfe	F	(Denmark) Aalborg BK	Reacquired, signed as a free agent, terms not disclosed	
April 26, 2012	(Brazil) Alex Monteiro de Lima	M	(Switzerland) FC Wohlen	Signed on a free transfer, terms not disclosed; was added to the roster upon the opening of the summer transfer window on June 27	
July 24, 2012	(Netherlands) Sherjill MacDonald	F	(Belgium) Beerschot AC	Signed as a Designated Player, terms not disclosed	
July 27, 2012	(Uruguay) Álvaro Fernández	M	(United States) Seattle Sounders FC	Acquired as a Designated Player in return for allocation money, terms not disclosed	
September 10, 2012	(United States) Wells Thompson	M	(United States) Colorado Rapids	Acquired in exchange for a conditional draft pick, terms not disclosed	
September 14, 2012	(Mexico) Guillermo Franco	F	(Mexico) Pachuca	Signed on a free transfer, terms not disclosed	

==== Out ====
Date	Player	Position	Destination club	Fee/notes	Ref
December 2, 2011	(United States) Alec Dufty	GK	None	Placed on Re-Entry list, was not selected in the Re-Entry Draft, became a free agent	
December 7, 2011	(United States) Cristian Nazarit	F	(Colombia) Deportivo Cali	Released	
December 7, 2011	(United States) Gabriel Ferrari	F	None	Released	
December 12, 2011	(United States) Jon Conway	GK	(United States) Los Angeles Galaxy	Selected by Los Angeles Galaxy in the Re-Entry Draft; retired on January 10, 2012	
December 12, 2011	(United States) Baggio Husidić	M	(Sweden) Hammarby IF	Selected by Colorado Rapids in the Re-Entry Draft, declined and signed with the Swedish Hammarby IF	
January 15, 2012	(Uruguay) Diego Cháves	F	(Chile) C.D. Palestino	Out of contract, signed with the Chilean C.D. Palestino	
January 23, 2012	(United States) Mike Banner	M	None	Waived	
January 26, 2012	(Croatia) Josip Mikulić	D	None	Returned to Croatia due to family issues	
January 26, 2012	(Colombia) Yamith Cuesta	D	(Spain) UB Conquense	Loan expired, loan agreement is not presently allowing to re-sign	
January 30, 2012	(Colombia) Wilman Conde	D	(United States) New York Red Bulls	Free transfer after MLS rights were acquired by New York Red Bulls for allocation money	
March 11, 2012	(Greece) Pari Pantazopoulos	D	None	Waived	
June 26, 2012	(Zimbabwe) Kheli Dube	F	None	Waived	
June 27, 2012	(United States) Kwame Watson-Siriboe	D	(United States) Real Salt Lake	Traded to Real Salt Lake in exchange for 4th round pick in the 2014 MLS SuperDraft	
August 30, 2012	(Guatemala) Marco Pappa	M	(Netherlands) SC Heerenveen	Transferred effective immediately, terms not disclosed; previously announced on Aug 13 Pappa would be transferred at the end of the MLS 2012 season	

- The following players selected by Chicago Fire in either the 2012 MLS SuperDraft or 2012 MLS Supplemental Draft were released during the pre-season trials: FW Evans Frimpong, Supplemental Draft round 1; GK Karl Woszczynski, Supplemental Draft round 1; MF Justin Chavez, Supplemental Draft round 4. FW Lucky Mkosana, SuperDraft round 2, entered the season but ultimately was not signed by the club.

=== Loans ===
==== In ====
Date	Player	Position	Loaned from	Fee/notes	Ref

==== Out ====
Date	Player	Position	Loaned to	Fee/notes	Ref
July 24, 2012	(Uruguay) Federico Puppo	F	(Uruguay) Defensor Sporting	For the remainder of the season; terms not disclosed	
July 26, 2012	(Colombia) Rafael Robayo	M	(Colombia) Millonarios	For the remainder of the season; terms not disclosed	
August 17, 2012	(Argentina) Sebastián Grazzini	M	(Argentina) Atlético de Rafaela	For the remainder of the season; terms not disclosed	
September 13, 2012	(Israel) Orr Barouch	F	(Israel) Bnei Yehuda	For the remainder of the season; terms not disclosed	

== Club staff ==
Position	Staff
Head Coach	(United States) Frank Klopas
Assistant Coaches	(Uruguay) Leo Percovich (United States) Mike Matkovich
Goalkeeper Coach	(United Kingdom) Aron Hyde
Strength & Conditioning Coach	(France) Tony Jouaux
Vice President of Soccer Operations	(Argentina) Guillermo Petrei
Director of Soccer & Team Development	(United States) Paul Cadwell
Director of Team Operations	(United States) Ron Stern
Head Equipment Manager	(United States) Charles Raycroft
Assistant Equipment Manager	(United States) Allan Araujo
Head Athletic Trainer	(United States) Bo Leonard, MS, ATC, PES-NASM
Assistant Athletic Trainer	(United States) Matt Zalewski, ATC
Massage Therapist	(United States) Jake Bronowski, LMT
Team Medical Director	(United States) Dr. Gilberto Munoz

Last updated: October 23, 2012
Source: Chicago Fire Technical Staff

== Standings ==
Eastern Conference Table

Pos	Team	Pld	W	L	T	GF	GA	GD	Pts	Qualification
1	Sporting Kansas City	34	18	7	9	42	27	+15	63	MLS Cup Conference Semifinals
2	D.C. United	34	17	10	7	53	43	+10	58	MLS Cup Conference Semifinals
3	New York Red Bulls	34	16	9	9	57	46	+11	57	MLS Cup Conference Semifinals
4	Chicago Fire	34	17	11	6	46	41	+5	57	MLS Cup Knockout Round
5	Houston Dynamo	34	14	9	11	48	41	+7	53	MLS Cup Knockout Round
6	Columbus Crew	34	15	12	7	44	44	0	52	
7	Montreal Impact	34	12	16	6	45	51	−6	42	
8	Philadelphia Union	34	10	18	6	37	45	−8	36	
9	New England Revolution	34	9	17	8	39	44	−5	35	
10	Toronto FC	34	5	21	8	36	62	−26	23	

Source: MLS

Western Conference Table

Pos	Team	Pld	W	L	T	GF	GA	GD	Pts	Qualification
1	San Jose Earthquakes	34	19	6	9	72	43	+29	66	MLS Cup Conference Semifinals
2	Real Salt Lake	34	17	11	6	46	35	+11	57	MLS Cup Conference Semifinals
3	Seattle Sounders FC	34	15	8	11	51	33	+18	56	MLS Cup Conference Semifinals
4	LA Galaxy	34	16	12	6	59	47	+12	54	MLS Cup Knockout Round
5	Vancouver Whitecaps FC	34	11	13	10	35	41	−6	43	MLS Cup Knockout Round
6	FC Dallas	34	9	13	12	42	47	−5	39	
7	Colorado Rapids	34	11	19	4	44	50	−6	37	
8	Portland Timbers	34	8	16	10	34	56	−22	34	
9	Chivas USA	34	7	18	9	24	58	−34	30	

Source: MLS

Overall table

Pos	Team	Pld	W	L	T	GF	GA	GD	Pts	Qualification
1	San Jose Earthquakes (S)	34	19	6	9	72	43	+29	66	CONCACAF Champions League
2	Sporting Kansas City	34	18	7	9	42	27	+15	63	CONCACAF Champions League
3	D.C. United	34	17	10	7	53	43	+10	58	
4	New York Red Bulls	34	16	9	9	57	46	+11	57	
5	Real Salt Lake	34	17	11	6	46	35	+11	57	
6	Chicago Fire	34	17	11	6	46	41	+5	57	
7	Seattle Sounders FC	34	15	8	11	51	33	+18	56	
8	LA Galaxy (C)	34	16	12	6	59	47	+12	54	CONCACAF Champions League
9	Houston Dynamo	34	14	9	11	48	41	+7	53	CONCACAF Champions League
10	Columbus Crew	34	15	12	7	44	44	0	52	
11	Vancouver Whitecaps FC	34	11	13	10	35	41	−6	43	
12	Montreal Impact	34	12	16	6	45	51	−6	42	CONCACAF Champions League
13	FC Dallas	34	9	13	12	42	47	−5	39	
14	Colorado Rapids	34	11	19	4	44	50	−6	37	
15	Philadelphia Union	34	10	18	6	37	45	−8	36	
16	New England Revolution	34	9	17	8	39	44	−5	35	
17	Portland Timbers	34	8	16	10	34	56	−22	34	
18	Chivas USA	34	7	18	9	24	58	−34	30	
19	Toronto FC	34	5	21	8	36	62	−26	23	

Source: MLS
Rules for classification: 1) points; 2) head-to-head record; 3) goal difference; 4) number of goals scored
(C) MLS Cup Champion; (S) Supporters' Shield

=== Results summary ===
Overall								Home						Away					
Pld	Pts	W	L	T	GF	GA	GD	W	L	T	GF	GA	GD	W	L	T	GF	GA	GD
34	57	17	11	6	46	41	+5	11	3	3	27	18	+9	6	8	3	19	23	−4

Last updated: October 27, 2012
Source: MLSsoccer.com standings
Pld = Matches played; Pts = Points; W = Matches won; T = Matches tied; L = Matches lost; GF = Goals for; GA = Goals against; GD = Goal difference

=== Results by round ===
Round	1	2	3	4	5	6	7	8	9	10	11	12	13	14	15	16	17	18	19	20	21	22	23	24	25	26	27	28	29	30	31	32	33	34
Stadium	A	H	A	H	A	H	A	H	H	A	H	A	A	H	H	A	A	H	H	A	A	H	A	H	A	H	A	H	H	A	H	A	A	H
Result	T	W	L	T	W	L	W	T	W	L	W	L	L	W	W	W	T	L	W	L	T	W	W	W	L	W	W	W	W	L	L	W	L	T
Conference	3	3	7	7	4	4	5	4	4	4	4	4	5	4	4	4	4	4	4	4	5	5	4	3	4	3	2	2	2	3	3	2	3	4
Overall	11	10	13	15	12	12	11	11	9	9	7	9	10	9	8	6	7	8	7	7	10	7	6	5	6	6	4	3	3	4	4	3	6	6

Updated to match(es) played on October 27, 2012. Source: MLS conference standings and MLS Supporters' Shield standings
A = Away; H = Home; W = Win; L = Loss; T = Tie

== Match results ==
Win Tie Loss

=== Pre-season ===
Kickoff times are in CST.

January 29, 2012 Pre-season	D.C. United	0–0	Chicago Fire	Fort Myers, Florida
12:00	Perry Kitchen (yellow card) 32'	Report		Stadium: Florida Gulf Coast University; Attendance: 1,800; Referee: Andres Pfefferkorn

February 1, 2012 Pre-season	Chicago Fire	3–0	FGCU	Ave Maria, Florida
18:30	Marco Pappa 7'; Dominic Oduro 21'; Cory Gibbs (yellow card) 28'; Orr Barouch 60'	Report	Christian Velez (yellow card) 90'	Stadium: Ave Maria University

February 4, 2012 Int'l Friendly	Real C.D. España	1–3	Chicago Fire	New Orleans, Louisiana
17:00	Edder Delgado 38'	Report	Patrick Nyarko (yellow card) 21'; Dominic Oduro 26', 44'; Pari Pantazopoulos (yellow card) 80'; Orr Barouch 88'	Stadium: Tad Gormley Stadium; Attendance: 6,234; Referee: Jasen Anno

February 11, 2012 Pre-season	Chivas USA	0–1	Chicago Fire	Oxnard, California
14:00		Report	Daniel Paladini 49'	Stadium: Oxnard College; Referee: Kevin Stott

February 11, 2012 Pre-season	Ventura County Fusion	0–0	Chicago Fire Reserves	Oxnard, California
14:00		Report		Stadium: Oxnard College

February 15, 2012 Pre-season	Portland Timbers	2–0	Chicago Fire	Carson, California
13:00	Eric Alexander 64'; Jorge Perlaza 113'	Report; 120 min game		Stadium: The Home Depot Center; Attendance: Free admission

February 18, 2012 Pre-season	San Jose Earthquakes	2–0	Chicago Fire	Oxnard, California
11:30	Steven Lenhart 3'; Brad Ring 38'	Report; 75 min game		Stadium: Oxnard College; Referee: Kevin Stott

February 18, 2012 Pre-season	Ventura County Fusion	1–2	Chicago Fire Reserves	Oxnard, California
11:30	Unidentified 18'	Report; 75 min game	Orr Barouch 58' (pen.); Pari Pantazopoulos 68'	Stadium: Oxnard College

February 25, 2012 CCC	D.C. United	1–0	Chicago Fire	Charleston, South Carolina
16:00	Marcelo Saragosa (yellow card) 30'; Emiliano Dudar (yellow card) 50'; Hamdi Salihi 66'	Report	Dan Gargan (yellow card) 33'; Rafael Robayo (yellow card) 52'; Jalil Anibaba (yellow card) 77'	Stadium: Blackbaud Stadium

February 26, 2012 Pre-season	College of Charleston	1–2	Chicago Fire Reserves	Charleston, South Carolina
10:00	Tanner Clay 61'	Report	Kheli Dube 27'; Kellen Gulley 40'	Stadium: Blackbaud Stadium

February 29, 2012 CCC	Columbus Crew	0–1	Chicago Fire	Charleston, South Carolina
16:00	Tony Tchani (yellow card) 73'	Report	Amadou Sanyang (yellow card) 38'; Gonzalo Segares (yellow card) 75'; Federico Puppo 80'	Stadium: Blackbaud Stadium

March 3, 2012 CCC	Charleston Battery	canceled	Chicago Fire	Charleston, South Carolina
18:15		Advisory		Stadium: Blackbaud Stadium
Note: Match canceled due to severe thunderstorms in the area, it will not be rescheduled.

March 9, 2012 Pre-season	Chicago Fire	3–1	Minnesota Stars FC	Bridgeview, Illinois
10:00	Dominic Oduro 18'; Daniel Paladini 66'; Orr Barouch 81'	Report	Connor Tobin 88'	Stadium: Toyota Park practice field Referee: Michael Kennedy

=== Major League Soccer ===
Kickoff times are in CDT.

March 17, 2012 Match 1	Montreal Impact	1–1	Chicago Fire	Montreal, Quebec
13:00	Arnaud 56'; Neagle (yellow card) 84'; Nyassi (yellow card) 89'	Report	Grazzini (yellow card) 42'; Oduro 71'; Pardo (yellow card) 87'	Stadium: Olympic Stadium; Attendance: 58,912; Referee: Kevin Stott

March 24, 2012 Match 2	Chicago Fire	1–0	Philadelphia Union	Bridgeview, Illinois
19:30	Oduro 28'; Grazzini (yellow card) 75'; Gibbs (yellow card) 81'	Report	Farfan (yellow card) 59'	Stadium: Toyota Park; Attendance: 18,075; Referee: Ricardo Salazar

April 1, 2012 Match 3	Colorado Rapids	2–0	Chicago Fire	Commerce City, Colorado
18:00	Cummings 58'; Hill 92+'	Report; Live TV: Galavisión	Grazzini (yellow card) 55'	Stadium: Dick's Sporting Goods Park; Attendance: 13,152; Referee: Chris Penso

April 15, 2012 Match 4	Chicago Fire	1–1	Houston Dynamo	Bridgeview, Illinois
18:00	Bruin 24'	Report; Live TV: Galavisión	Pause 27'; Pappa (yellow card) 49'; Nyarko (yellow card) 61'	Stadium: Toyota Park; Attendance: 10,489; Referee: Geoff Gamble
Note: The match was first delayed in the 13th minute for an hour and ten minutes and then called in the 66th minute due to inclement weather.

April 21, 2012 Match 5	Toronto FC	2–3	Chicago Fire	Toronto, Ontario
14:30	Cann (yellow card) 24'; Lambe 36', 40'; Guzman (yellow card) 70'; Eckersley (yellow card) 80'	Report; Live TV: NBC Sports	Oduro 1'; Segares 41'; Nyarko 58'	Stadium: BMO Field; Attendance: 19,255; Referee: Kevin Stott

April 28, 2012 Match 6	Chicago Fire	1–2	Seattle Sounders FC	Bridgeview, Illinois
19:30	Pappa 89' (yellow card) 91'; Anibaba (red card) 97+'; Klopas (red card) 97+'	Report	Friedrich 39' (o.g.); Estrada (yellow card) 60'; Johnson 67'; Montero (yellow card) 91'; Johnson (yellow card) 92'	Stadium: Toyota Park; Attendance: 14,166; Referee: Michael Kennedy

May 4, 2012 Match 7	Chivas USA	1–2	Chicago Fire	Carson, California
22:00	Minda (yellow card) 16'; Ángel 23' (pen.)	Report; Live TV: ESPN Deportes	Pardo (yellow card) 20'; Berry 25'; Oduro (yellow card) 72'; Pappa 93+'	Stadium: Home Depot Center; Attendance: 14,652; Referee: Baldomero Toledo

May 9, 2012 Match 8	Chicago Fire	0–0	Real Salt Lake	Bridgeview, Illinois
19:30		Report	Beckerman (yellow card) 71'	Stadium: Toyota Park; Attendance: 13,544; Referee: Jair Marrufo

May 12, 2012 Match 9	Chicago Fire	2–1	Sporting Kansas City	Bridgeview, Illinois
19:30	Segares (yellow card) 40'; Grazzini 61' (pen.); Puppo (yellow card) 79'; Oduro 81'	Report	César (yellow card) 4'; Convey 31'; Myers (yellow card) 57'; Espinoza (red card) 62'; Kamara (yellow card) 93+'	Stadium: Toyota Park; Attendance: 14,159; Referee: Jose Carlos Rivero

May 20, 2012 Match 10	Portland Timbers	2–1	Chicago Fire	Portland, Oregon
18:00	Brunner 19'; Chabala (yellow card) 45'; Pause 52' (o.g.); Zizzo (yellow card) 79'	Report; Live TV: Galavisión	Anibaba 40'; Nyarko (yellow card) 45'; Segares (yellow card) 48'; Grazzini (yellow card) 80'; Berry (yellow card) 85'	Stadium: Jeld-Wen Field; Attendance: 20,438; Referee: Silviu Petrescu

May 23, 2012 Match 11	Chicago Fire	2–1	FC Dallas	Bridgeview, Illinois
19:30	Gargan (yellow card) 36'; Grazzini 45'; Pappa 63' (yellow card) 64'; Barouch (yellow card) 69'; Robayo (yellow card) 89'	Report	John (yellow card) 30'; Hedges 41'; Keeshan (red card) post-game'	Stadium: Toyota Park; Attendance: 11,947; Referee: Hilario Grajeda

May 26, 2012 Match 12	Columbus Crew	2–1	Chicago Fire	Columbus, Ohio
18:00	Gaven 9'; Rentería 43'; Anor (yellow card) 67'	Report; Live TV: Univision	Berry 72'	Stadium: Columbus Crew Stadium; Attendance: 16,024; Referee: Allen Chapman

June 2, 2012 Match 13	New England Revolution	2–0	Chicago Fire	Foxborough, Massachusetts
18:30	Rowe 69'; Feilhaber 73'	Report	Orr Barouch (yellow card) 60'	Stadium: Gillette Stadium; Attendance: 12,523; Referee: Fotis Bazakos

June 17, 2012 Match 14	Chicago Fire	3–1	New York Red Bulls	Bridgeview, Illinois
16:00	Nyarko 4'; Gargan (yellow card) 37'; Oduro (yellow card) 65'; Segares 68' (yellow card) 79'; Rolfe 81'	Report	Dax McCarty 55'; Dane Richards (yellow card) 80'	Stadium: Toyota Park; Attendance: 18,526; Referee: Baldomero Toledo

June 23, 2012 Match 15	Chicago Fire	2–1	Columbus Crew	Bridgeview, Illinois
19:30	Pappa 2'; Oduro 26'; Segares (red card) 29'; Gargan (yellow card) 85'	Report	Tchani 36'; George (yellow card) 66'; Schoenfeld (yellow card) 94+'	Stadium: Toyota Park; Attendance: 17,144; Referee: Armando Villarreal

June 29, 2012 Match 16	Sporting Kansas City	0–1	Chicago Fire	Kansas City, Kansas
19:00	Nielsen (yellow card) 86'	Report; Live TV: NBC Sports	Anibaba (yellow card) 33'; Pappa 58'; Rolfe (yellow card) 87'	Stadium: Livestrong Sporting Park; Attendance: 19,274; Referee: Baldomero Toledo

July 3, 2012 Match 17	Houston Dynamo	0–0	Chicago Fire	Houston, Texas
19:30	Ashe (yellow card) 38'	Report		Stadium: BBVA Compass Stadium; Attendance: 22,039; Referee: Allen Chapman

July 8, 2012 Match 18	Chicago Fire	0–2	Los Angeles Galaxy	Bridgeview, Illinois
14:00	Pappa (yellow card) 69'	Report	Lopes (yellow card) 14'; Junior (yellow card) 14'; Keane 24' (pen.), 78'	Stadium: Toyota Park; Attendance: 20,533; Referee: Jair Marrufo

July 14, 2012 Match 19	Chicago Fire	1–0	Vancouver Whitecaps FC	Bridgeview, Illinois
19:30	Pardo 10'; Segares (yellow card) 36'; Lima (yellow card) 41'; Friedrich (yellow card) 67' (yellow-red card) 69'	Report	Mattocks (yellow card) 12'; Rochat (yellow card) 43'	Stadium: Toyota Park; Attendance: 16,820; Referee: Jose Carlos Rivero

July 18, 2012 Match 20	New York Red Bulls	1–0	Chicago Fire	Harrison, New Jersey
12:00	Barklage (yellow card) 61'; Henry 71'	Report	Marco Pappa (yellow card) 20'; Patrick Nyarko (yellow card) 91'	Stadium: Red Bull Arena; Attendance: 15,814; Referee: Edvin Jurisevic

July 28, 2012 Match 21	San Jose Earthquakes	1–1	Chicago Fire	Santa Clara, California
21:30	Gordon (yellow card) 54' (yellow-red card) 93+'; Wondolowski (yellow card) 93+'; Lenhart 98+'	Report	Rolfe 37'; Gargan (yellow card) 70'	Stadium: Buck Shaw Stadium; Attendance: 10,525; Referee: Chris Penso

August 4, 2012 Match 22	Chicago Fire	2–1	Toronto FC	Bridgeview, Illinois
19:30	Friedrich (yellow card) 34'; Oduro (yellow card) 45'; Pappa 64'; Berry 84'	Report	Johnson 16'; Emory (yellow card) 40' (yellow-red card) 79'	Stadium: Toyota Park; Attendance: 15,757; Referee: Michael Kennedy

August 12, 2012 Match 23	Philadelphia Union	1–3	Chicago Fire	Chester, Pennsylvania
18:00	Anibaba 34' (o.g.)	Report; Live TV: Galavisión	Rolfe 43', 56'; Friedrich 47+'	Stadium: PPL Park; Attendance: 18,412; Referee: Fotis Bazakos

August 18, 2012 Match 24	Chicago Fire	2–1	New England Revolution	Bridgeview, Illinois
19:30	Rolfe 5' (pen.); MacDonald 25'; Johnson (yellow card) 89'	Report	Cárdenas 11'; Guy (yellow card) 69'	Stadium: Toyota Park; Attendance: 17,495; Referee: Sorin Stoica

August 22, 2012 Match 25	D.C. United	4–2	Chicago Fire	Washington, D.C.
18:30	Rosario 19'; Pajoy 45+'; McDonald 51'; Hamid (yellow card) 80'; Tan 89'	Report	Paladini 44'; Segares 75'; MacDonald (yellow card) 81'; Pardo (yellow card) 83'	Stadium: RFK Memorial Stadium; Attendance: 10,291; Referee: Ismail Elfath

September 2, 2012 Match 26	Chicago Fire	3–1	Houston Dynamo	Bridgeview, Illinois
18:00	Nyarko 1'; Paladini 19'; Lima 93+'	Report; Live TV: Galavisión	Boswell (yellow card) 79'; Ching 90'	Stadium: Toyota Park; Attendance: 17,007; Referee: Dave Gantar

September 12, 2012 Match 27	Toronto FC	1–2	Chicago Fire	Toronto, Ontario
18:00	Morgan (yellow card) 66'; Hassli 79'; Avila (yellow card) 90'	Report	Fernández 13'; Rolfe 42'	Stadium: BMO Field; Attendance: 14,623; Referee: Ed Jurisevic

September 15, 2012 Match 28	Chicago Fire	3–1	Montreal Impact	Bridgeview, Illinois
19:30	MacDonald 34'; Gargan (yellow card) 47'; Lima 61'; Fernández 80'	Report	Marco Di Vaio 20'	Stadium: Toyota Park; Attendance: 17,691; Referee: Paul Ward

September 22, 2012 Match 29	Chicago Fire	2–1	Columbus Crew	Bridgeview, Illinois
19:30	Chris RolfeRolfe 23', 26'; Johnson (yellow card) 89'	Report	Arrieta 15'; O'Rourke (yellow card) 29'; Rentería (yellow card) 35'	Stadium: Toyota Park; Attendance: 19,172; Referee: Michael Kennedy

September 28, 2012 Match 30	Sporting Kansas City	2–0	Chicago Fire	Kansas City, Kansas
19:30	Zusi 11', 96+'; Nagamura (yellow card) 70'	Report; Live TV: NBC Sports	Friedrich (yellow card) 25'; Segares (yellow card) 72' (yellow-red card) 94+'; Klopas (red card)	Stadium: Livestrong Sporting Park; Attendance: 21,010; Referee: Chris Penso

October 3, 2012 Match 31	Chicago Fire	1–3	Philadelphia Union	Bridgeview, Illinois
19:30	Berry (yellow card) 45'; Oduro 69'; Franco (red card) 79'	Report	McInerney 7'; Lahoud (yellow card) 18'; Gómez 67'; Williams (yellow card) 78'; Hoppenot 87'	Stadium: Toyota Park; Attendance: 16,375; Referee: Abbey Okulaja

October 6, 2012 Match 32	New York Red Bulls	0–2	Chicago Fire	Harrison, New Jersey
14:30	Conde (yellow card) 14'; Henry (yellow card) 43'	Report; Live TV: NBC	Paladini (yellow card) 28'; MacDonald 65', 78'	Stadium: Red Bull Arena; Attendance: 21,157; Referee: Ricardo Salazar

October 20, 2012 Match 33	New England Revolution	1–0	Chicago Fire	Foxborough, Massachusetts
18:30	Fagundez 17'; Bengtson (yellow card) 44'	Report	MacDonald (yellow card) 67'	Stadium: Gillette Stadium; Attendance: 25,534; Referee: Kevin Stott

October 27, 2012 Match 34	Chicago Fire	1–1	D.C. United	Bridgeview, Illinois
15:00	Nyarko 16'; Friedrich (yellow card) 47'	Report; Live TV: NBC Sports	Pajoy 50'; McDonald (yellow card) 56'; Jakovic (yellow card) 82'	Stadium: Toyota Park; Attendance: 20,017; Referee: Jair Marrufo

=== MLS Cup Playoffs ===
Kickoff times are in CDT.

October 31, 2012 Knockout Round	Chicago Fire	1–2	Houston Dynamo	Bridgeview, Illinois
20:00	Alex 83'	Report	Will Bruin 12', 46'; Brad Davis (yellow card) 67'; Tally Hall (yellow card) 91+'	Stadium: Toyota Park; Attendance: 10,923; Referee: Baldomero Toledo

=== U.S. Open Cup ===
Kickoff times are in CDT.

May 29, 2012 Third Round	Michigan Bucks	3–2 (a.e.t.)	Chicago Fire	Pontiac, Michigan
18:30	Tommy Catalano 9'; Nermin Crnkic (yellow card) 29'; Nate Boyden 79'; Nermin Crnkic 93'	Report	Daniel Paladini (yellow card) 25'; Corben Bone 28'; Federico Puppo 51'	Stadium: Ultimate Soccer Arenas; Attendance: 2,006; Referee: Britt Maier

=== International friendlies ===
Kickoff times are in CDT.

July 21, 2012	Chicago Fire	0–1	(England) Aston Villa	Bridgeview, Illinois
19:30	Daniel Paladini (yellow card) 49'	Report	Gabriel Agbonlahor 29'; Fabian Delph (yellow card) 48'; Samir Carruthers (yellow card) 90+'; Nathan Delfouneso (yellow card) 90+'	Stadium: Toyota Park; Attendance: 16,388; Referee: Dan Fitzgerald

September 8, 2012	Chicago Fire	2–2	(Mexico) Santos Laguna	Bridgeview, Illinois
19:30	Victor Pineda (yellow card) 22'; Michael Videira 48'; Daniel Paladini (yellow card) 61'; Corben Bone 63'; Hunter Jumper (yellow card) 72'	Report	Benji Joya 24'; Daniel Ludueña 29'; Kenyi Adachi (yellow card) 43'; Cándido Ramírez (yellow card) 51'; Marc Crosas (yellow card) 72'	Stadium: Toyota Park; Attendance: 18,597; Referee: Jesus Cisneros

== Recognition ==
=== Kits ===
Home	Away	Away special

Type	Shirt	Shorts	Socks	First appearance / Info
Home	Red / White lettering	Red	Red	
Away	Navy / White lettering	Navy	Navy	
Away Special	Navy / Pink lettering	Navy	Pink	MLS, October 27 against D.C. United

=== Leading scorers ===
Rank	Scorer	Goals	Assists
1	(United States) Chris Rolfe	8	3
2	(Guatemala) Marco Pappa	6	5
3	(Ghana) Dominic Oduro	6	3
4	(Ghana) Patrick Nyarko	4	7
5	(Netherlands) Sherjill MacDonald	4	4
6	(Costa Rica) Gonzalo Segares	3	1
7	(United States) Austin Berry	3	0
8	(Argentina) Sebastián Grazzini	2	5
9	(United States) Daniel Paladini	2	2
10	(Uruguay) Álvaro Fernández	2	1
11	(Brazil) Alex	2	0
12	(Mexico) Pável Pardo	1	4
13	(United States) Jalil Anibaba	1	1
14	(Germany) Arne Friedrich	1	0
14	(United States) Logan Pause	1	0
16	(United States) Sean Johnson	0	1
16	(Uruguay) Federico Puppo	0	1
16	(United States) Dan Gargan	0	1

Updated to match played on October 27, 2012.
Source: MLSsoccer.com statistics - 2012 Chicago Fire

=== MLS Team of the Week ===
Week	Player	Position	Report
3	(Guatemala) Marco Pappa	MF	Report
7	(Ghana) Patrick Nyarko	FW	Report
9	(United States) Austin Berry	DF	Report
9	(Guatemala) Marco Pappa	MF	Report
16	(United States) Sean Johnson	GK	Report
17	(United States) Sean Johnson	GK	Report
17	(Germany) Arne Friedrich	DF	Report
19	(United States) Austin Berry	DF	Report
23	(Germany) Arne Friedrich	DF	Report
23	(United States) Chris Rolfe	FW	Report
24	(United States) Chris Rolfe	FW	Report
26	(Germany) Arne Friedrich	DF	Report
26	(Ghana) Patrick Nyarko	MF	Report
28	(United States) Jalil Anibaba	FW	Report
28	(Uruguay) Álvaro Fernández	MF	Report
28	(United States) Frank Klopas	Coach	Report
29	(United States) Chris Rolfe	FW	Report
31	(Germany) Arne Friedrich	DF	Report
31	(Netherlands) Sherjill MacDonald	FW	Report
33	(Ghana) Patrick Nyarko	MF	Report

=== MLS Player of the Week ===
Week	Player	Report
28	(United States) Sean Johnson	POTW

=== MLS Save of the Week ===
Week	Player	Save	Report
4	(Italy) Paolo Tornaghi	65'	SOTW
10	(United States) Sean Johnson	43'	SOTW
21	(United States) Sean Johnson	59'	SOTW

=== MLS Goal of the Week ===
Week	Player	Goal	Report
8	(Guatemala) Marco Pappa	89'	GOTW

=== MLS Fair Play Award ===
Chicago Fire's midfielder and captain, Logan Pause, has been awarded the league's 2012 Fair Play Award. Over the course of 32 matches played this season, Pause has accumulated only 11 fouls and no yellow or red cards.

=== MLS Rookie of the Year ===
Chicago Fire's defender Austin Berry, selected number nine overall in the 2012 MLS SuperDraft, has been awarded the league's 2012 Rookie of the Year Award. Berry has started in 28 games and scored three goals, one in his debut match. Berry collected the most votes in all three categories: players, media and club management.

== Miscellany ==
=== Allocation ranking ===
Chicago is in the #9 position in the MLS Allocation Ranking. The allocation ranking is the mechanism used to determine which MLS club has first priority to acquire a U.S. National Team player who signs with MLS after playing abroad, or a former MLS player who returns to the league after having gone to a club abroad for a transfer fee. A ranking can be traded, provided that part of the compensation received in return is another club's ranking.

=== International roster slots ===
Chicago has 8 MLS International Roster Slots for use in the 2012 season. Each club in Major League Soccer is allocated 8 international roster spots. No slot trades involving Chicago have been reported.

=== Future draft pick trades ===
Future picks acquired: *2014 MLS SuperDraft round 4 pick from Real Salt Lake.
Future picks traded: *2013 MLS Supplemental Draft round 1 pick to Vancouver Whitecaps FC. At the time of the trade, this pick was equivalent to a round 3 SuperDraft selection.

=== MLS rights to other players ===
It is believed Chicago maintains the MLS rights to Carlos Bocanegra and Freddie Ljungberg, as each of these players declined contract offers by the club and signed overseas on free transfers.
