= 2013 Chicago Fire season =

Chicago Fire Soccer Club
2013 season
- Chairman: Andrew Hauptman
- Head coach: Frank Klopas
- Stadium: Toyota Park (capacity: 20,000)
- MLS: 12th overall (6th in the Eastern Conference)
- MLS Cup Playoffs: Did not qualify
- U.S. Open Cup: Semifinals
- Carolina Challenge Cup: Winners
- Brimstone Cup: Winners
- Top goalscorer: Mike Magee (15 goals)
- Highest home attendance: Regular season: 19,889 vs Toronto FC (October 19); Friendly: 20,042 vs Club América (July 10)
- Lowest home attendance: 9,723 vs Chivas USA (March 24)
- Average home league attendance: 15,228 (regular season)
- Biggest win: CHI 4-1 DC (7/20)
- Biggest defeat: RBNY 5-2 CHI (10/27)
| Home colors | Away colors |

The 2013 Chicago Fire season was the club's 15th year of existence, as well as their 16th season in Major League Soccer and their 16th consecutive year in the top-flight of American soccer.

Chicago Fire began the regular season on March 3, 2013 with an away match against the defending champions Los Angeles Galaxy. The Men in Red concluded the regular season on October 27, 2013 with an away match against New York Red Bulls.

The Fire finished the regular season with a 14-13-7 record, but narrowly missed the playoffs, losing the spot to the Montreal Impact on second tiebreaker. On October 30, 2013, the club has announced the head coach Frank Klopas and the president of soccer operations Javier Leon have stepped down.

On December 5, 2013 the club's forward Mike Magee was named the MLS Most Valuable Player.

== Squad at the end of the season ==
As of October 27, 2013. Source: Chicago Fire official roster

| No. | Name | Nationality | Position | Date of birth (age) | Previous club |
Goalkeepers
| 1 | Alec Kann | (United States) | GK | August 8, 1990 (aged 23) | (United States) Charleston Battery |
| 25 | Sean Johnson | (United States) | GK | May 31, 1989 (aged 24) | (United States) Atlanta Blackhawks |
| 70 | Paolo Tornaghi | (Italy) | GK | June 21, 1988 (aged 25) | (Italy) Inter Milan |
Defenders
| 3 | Hunter Jumper | (United States) | LB | February 28, 1989 (aged 24) | (United States) University of Virginia Cavaliers |
| 4 | Bakary Soumaré | (Mali) | CB | November 9, 1985 (aged 27) | (United States) Philadelphia Union |
| 6 | Jalil Anibaba | (United States) | CB | October 19, 1988 (aged 25) | (United States) Carolina Dynamo |
| 13 | Gonzalo Segares | (Costa Rica) | LB | October 13, 1982 (aged 31) | (Cyprus) Apollon Limassol |
| 18 | Steven Kinney | (United States) | RB | October 28, 1987 (aged 25) | (United States) Carolina Dynamo |
| 22 | Austin Berry | (United States) | CB | June 6, 1988 (aged 25) | (United States) University of Louisville Cardinals |
| 28 | Shaun Francis | (Jamaica) | D | October 2, 1986 (aged 27) | (United States) Charlotte Eagles |
Midfielders
| 5 | Arévalo Ríos | (Uruguay) | M | January 1, 1982 (aged 31) | (Italy) Palermo |
| 8 | Dilly Duka | (United States) | M | September 15, 1989 (aged 24) | (United States) Columbus Crew |
| 11 | Daniel Paladini | (United States) | M | November 11, 1984 (aged 28) | (United States) Carolina RailHawks |
| 12 | Logan Pause | (United States) | M | August 22, 1981 (aged 32) | (United States) University of North Carolina Tar Heels |
| 15 | Wells Thompson | (United States) | M | November 25, 1983 (aged 29) | (United States) Colorado Rapids |
| 16 | Brendan King | (United States) | M | February 5, 1990 (aged 23) | (Norway) Alta IF |
| 19 | Corben Bone | (United States) | M | September 16, 1988 (aged 25) | (United States) Carolina Dynamo |
| 20 | Jeff Larentowicz | (United States) | M | August 5, 1983 (aged 30) | (United States) Colorado Rapids |
| 21 | Michael Videira | (United States) | M | January 6, 1986 (aged 27) | (United States) AC St. Louis |
| 26 | Joel Lindpere | (Estonia) | M | October 5, 1981 (aged 32) | (United States) New York Red Bulls |
| 27 | Victor Pineda | (United States) | M | March 15, 1993 (aged 20) | (United States) Chicago Fire Academy |
| 71 | Alex | (Brazil) | M | December 15, 1988 (aged 24) | (Switzerland) FC Wohlen |
Forwards
| 9 | Mike Magee | (United States) | F | September 2, 1984 (aged 29) | (United States) Los Angeles Galaxy |
| 14 | Patrick Nyarko | (Ghana) | F | January 15, 1986 (aged 27) | (United States) Virginia Tech Hokies |
| 17 | Chris Rolfe | (United States) | F | January 17, 1983 (aged 30) | (Denmark) Aalborg BK |
| 24 | Quincy Amarikwa | (United States) | F | October 29, 1987 (aged 25) | (Canada) Toronto FC |
| 29 | Maicon Santos | (Brazil) | F | April 18, 1984 (aged 29) | (United States) D.C. United |
| 30 | Yazid Atouba | (Cameroon) | F | January 2, 1993 (aged 20) | (Cameroon) Rainbow FC Bamenda |
| 33 | Juan Luis Anangonó | (Ecuador) | F | April 13, 1989 (aged 24) | (Argentina) Argentinos Juniors |

== Player movement ==
=== In ===
Per Major League Soccer and club policies terms of the deals do not get disclosed.

| Date | Player | Position | Previous club | Notes | Ref |
|---|---|---|---|---|---|
| November 7, 2012 | (Germany) Arne Friedrich | D | (United States) Chicago Fire | Re-signed through the end of 2013 season | |
| December 6, 2012 | (Costa Rica) Gonzalo Segares | D | (United States) Chicago Fire | Re-signed with the club to a multi-year deal | |
| December 7, 2012 | (Brazil) Maicon Santos | F | (United States) D.C. United | Selected in the Stage One of the 2012 MLS Re-Entry Draft | |
| January 4, 2013 | (Estonia) Joel Lindpere | M | (United States) New York Red Bulls | Acquired in exchange for a 2013 MLS International Roster Slot | |
| January 16, 2013 | (United States) Jeff Larentowicz | M | (United States) Colorado Rapids | Acquired together with the 30th pick (Round 2) in the 2013 MLS SuperDraft in exchange for the 11th pick (Round 1) in the 2013 MLS SuperDraft, allocation money and a 2013 MLS International Roster Slot | |
| January 21, 2013 | (United States) Corben Bone | M | (United States) Chicago Fire | Opted out of Stage Two of the 2012 MLS Re-Entry Draft; re-signed by the club on January 21, 2013 | |
| January 21, 2013 | (Brazil) Alex | M | (United States) Chicago Fire | Contract option was picked up by the club | |
| January 21, 2013 | (United States) Michael Videira | M | (United States) Chicago Fire | Contract option was picked up by the club | |
| January 31, 2013 | (United States) Brendan King | M | (Norway) Alta IF | Signed on a free transfer | |
| February 4, 2013 | (United States) Dilly Duka | M | (United States) Columbus Crew | Acquired together with the MLS rights to Robbie Rogers in exchange for Dominic Oduro | |
| February 27, 2013 | (United States) Quincy Amarikwa | F | (Canada) Toronto FC | Acquired in exchange for a first round selection in the 2014 MLS Supplemental Draft | |
| March 1, 2013 | (Cameroon) Yazid Atouba | M | (Cameroon) Rainbow FC Bamenda | Signed after being selected 30th overall (second round) in the 2013 MLS SuperDraft | |
| March 19, 2013 | (United States) Alec Kann | GK | (United States) Charleston Battery | Signed on a free transfer | |
| May 23, 2013 | (Mali) Bakary Soumaré | D | (United States) Philadelphia Union | Acquired in exchange for the second round pick in 2014 MLS SuperDraft and allocation money | |
| May 25, 2013 | (United States) Mike Magee | F | (United States) Los Angeles Galaxy | Acquired in exchange for the right of first refusal to Robbie Rogers and other considerations | |
| July 10, 2013 | (Jamaica) Shaun Francis | D | (United States) Charlotte Eagles | Signed per mutual agreement with Charlotte Eagles | |
| July 23, 2013 | (Ecuador) Juan Luis Anangonó | F | (Argentina) Argentinos Juniors | Signed as a Designated Player | |
| August 14, 2013 | (Uruguay) Arévalo Ríos | M | (Italy) Palermo | Signed as a Designated Player | |

=== Out ===
| Date | Player | Position | Destination Club | Notes | Ref |
|---|---|---|---|---|---|
| November 26, 2012 | (United States) Cory Gibbs | D | None | Retired | |
| December 14, 2012 | (United States) Dan Gargan | D | (United States) San Jose Earthquakes | Selected in the First Round of Stage Two of the 2012 MLS Re-Entry Draft | |
| December 14, 2012 | (United States) Jay Nolly | GK | None | Was not selected in the 2012 MLS Re-Entry Draft, became a free agent | |
| January 19, 2013 | (Mexico) Pável Pardo | M | None | Retired | |
| January 21, 2013 | (Mexico) Guillermo Franco | F | None | Contract option not picked up by the club | |
| February 4, 2013 | (Ghana) Dominic Oduro | F | (United States) Columbus Crew | Traded in exchange for Dilly Duka and the MLS rights to Robbie Rogers | |
| February 22, 2013 | (United States) Tony Walls | D | None | Waived | |
| June 23, 2013 | (Germany) Arne Friedrich | D | None | Retired | |
| August 14, 2013 | (Netherlands) Sherjill MacDonald | F | None | Released by mutual consent | |

- Players selected in the 2013 MLS Supplemental Draft, but ultimately not signed by the club (in the order they were released): defender Caleb Konstanski (selected 68th overall in Supplemental Draft, fourth round, from Indiana University), defender John Gallagher (30th overall in Supplemental Draft, second round, from Penn State), goalkeeper James Belshaw (49th overall in Supplemental Draft, third round, from Duke).
- Trialists who departed or were released in the preseason: midfielder Luke Boden, forward Sam Archer (winner of the Open Tryout), goalkeeper Ian Joyce, defender Rich Balchan, defender Eric Robertson, goalkeeper Neal Kitson, defender Rauwshan McKenzie, midfielder Borfor Carr, midfielder José Alexander Pabón, forward Blake Brettschneider, forward Dailos Tejera, forward Maxwell Griffin, forward Kevin Mercado, defender Pascal Chimbonda, defender Leo Lelis and forward Colin Rolfe.

=== Loans ===
==== In ====
| Date | Player | Position | Loaned From | Notes | Ref |

==== Out ====
Per Major League Soccer and club policies terms of the deals do not get disclosed.

| Date | Player | Position | Loaned To | Notes | Ref |
|---|---|---|---|---|---|
| July 26, 2012 | (Colombia) Rafael Robayo | M | (Colombia) Millonarios | The club did not announce the duration of the loan | |
| August 17, 2012 | (Argentina) Sebastián Grazzini | M | (Argentina) Atlético de Rafaela | The club did not announce the duration of the loan | |
| September 13, 2012 | (Israel) Orr Barouch | F | (Israel) Bnei Yehuda | Was loaned for the remainder of the 2012 season; current status not yet announced by the club | |
| January 25, 2013 | (Uruguay) Federico Puppo | F | (Ecuador) LDU Quito | For the 2013 season (one-year loan) | |
| April 1, 2013 | (United States) Kellen Gulley | F | (United States) Atlanta Silverbacks | Season-long loan | |
| July 9, 2013 | (Uruguay) Álvaro Fernández | M | (Uruguay) Nacional | Through the remainder of the 2013 season | |

== Technical staff ==
| Position | Staff |
|---|---|
| Head Coach | (United States) Frank Klopas |
| Assistant Coaches | (United States) Mike Matkovich (Uruguay) Leo Percovich |
| Goalkeeper Coach | (England) Aron Hyde |
| Strength and Conditioning Coach | (France) Tony Jouaux |
| Vice President of Soccer Operations | (Argentina) Guillermo Petrei |
| Head of Scouting | (Spain) Rafael Carmona |
| Director of Soccer & Team Development | (United States) Paul Cadwell |
| Director of Team Operations | (United States) Ron Stern |
| Head Equipment Manager | (United States) Charles Raycroft |
| Assistant Equipment Manager | (United States) Allan Araujo |
| Head Athletic Trainer | (United States) Bo Leonard, MS, ATC, PES-NASM |
| Assistant Athletic Trainer | (United States) Matt Zalewski, ATC |
| Massage Therapist | (United States) Jake Bronowski, LMT |
| Team Medical Director | (United States) Dr. Gilberto Munoz |

Last updated: October 27, 2013
Source: Chicago Fire Technical Staff

== Standings ==
=== Conference tables ===
Eastern Conference

| Pos | Team | Pld | W | L | T | GF | GA | GD | Pts | Qualification |
|---|---|---|---|---|---|---|---|---|---|---|
| 1 | New York Red Bulls | 34 | 17 | 9 | 8 | 58 | 41 | +17 | 59 | MLS Cup Conference Semifinals |
| 2 | Sporting Kansas City | 34 | 17 | 10 | 7 | 47 | 30 | +17 | 58 | MLS Cup Conference Semifinals |
| 3 | New England Revolution | 34 | 14 | 11 | 9 | 49 | 38 | +11 | 51 | MLS Cup Conference Semifinals |
| 4 | Houston Dynamo | 34 | 14 | 11 | 9 | 41 | 41 | 0 | 51 | MLS Cup Knockout Round |
| 5 | Montreal Impact | 34 | 14 | 13 | 7 | 50 | 49 | +1 | 49 | MLS Cup Knockout Round |
| 6 | Chicago Fire | 34 | 14 | 13 | 7 | 47 | 52 | −5 | 49 | |
| 7 | Philadelphia Union | 34 | 12 | 12 | 10 | 42 | 44 | −2 | 46 | |
| 8 | Columbus Crew | 34 | 12 | 17 | 5 | 42 | 46 | −4 | 41 | |
| 9 | Toronto FC | 34 | 6 | 17 | 11 | 30 | 47 | −17 | 29 | |
| 10 | D.C. United | 34 | 3 | 24 | 7 | 22 | 59 | −37 | 16 | |

Source: MLS

Western Conference

| Pos | Team | Pld | W | L | T | GF | GA | GD | Pts | Qualification |
|---|---|---|---|---|---|---|---|---|---|---|
| 1 | Portland Timbers | 34 | 14 | 5 | 15 | 54 | 33 | +21 | 57 | MLS Cup Conference Semifinals |
| 2 | Real Salt Lake | 34 | 16 | 10 | 8 | 57 | 41 | +16 | 56 | MLS Cup Conference Semifinals |
| 3 | LA Galaxy | 34 | 15 | 11 | 8 | 53 | 38 | +15 | 53 | MLS Cup Conference Semifinals |
| 4 | Seattle Sounders FC | 34 | 15 | 12 | 7 | 42 | 42 | 0 | 52 | MLS Cup Knockout Round |
| 5 | Colorado Rapids | 34 | 14 | 11 | 9 | 45 | 38 | +7 | 51 | MLS Cup Knockout Round |
| 6 | San Jose Earthquakes | 34 | 14 | 11 | 9 | 35 | 42 | −7 | 51 | |
| 7 | Vancouver Whitecaps FC | 34 | 13 | 12 | 9 | 53 | 45 | +8 | 48 | |
| 8 | FC Dallas | 34 | 11 | 12 | 11 | 48 | 52 | −4 | 44 | |
| 9 | Chivas USA | 34 | 6 | 20 | 8 | 30 | 67 | −37 | 26 | |

Source: MLS

=== Overall table ===
| Pos | Team | Pld | W | L | T | GF | GA | GD | Pts | Qualification |
|---|---|---|---|---|---|---|---|---|---|---|
| 1 | New York Red Bulls (S) | 34 | 17 | 9 | 8 | 58 | 41 | +17 | 59 | CONCACAF Champions League |
| 2 | Sporting Kansas City (C) | 34 | 17 | 10 | 7 | 47 | 30 | +17 | 58 | CONCACAF Champions League |
| 3 | Portland Timbers | 34 | 14 | 5 | 15 | 54 | 33 | +21 | 57 | CONCACAF Champions League |
| 4 | Real Salt Lake | 34 | 16 | 10 | 8 | 57 | 41 | +16 | 56 | |
| 5 | LA Galaxy | 34 | 15 | 11 | 8 | 53 | 38 | +15 | 53 | |
| 6 | Seattle Sounders FC | 34 | 15 | 12 | 7 | 42 | 42 | 0 | 52 | |
| 7 | New England Revolution | 34 | 14 | 11 | 9 | 49 | 38 | +11 | 51 | |
| 8 | Colorado Rapids | 34 | 14 | 11 | 9 | 45 | 38 | +7 | 51 | |
| 9 | Houston Dynamo | 34 | 14 | 11 | 9 | 41 | 41 | 0 | 51 | |
| 10 | San Jose Earthquakes | 34 | 14 | 11 | 9 | 35 | 42 | −7 | 51 | |
| 11 | Montreal Impact | 34 | 14 | 13 | 7 | 50 | 49 | +1 | 49 | CONCACAF Champions League |
| 12 | Chicago Fire | 34 | 14 | 13 | 7 | 47 | 52 | −5 | 49 | |
| 13 | Vancouver Whitecaps FC | 34 | 13 | 12 | 9 | 53 | 45 | +8 | 48 | |
| 14 | Philadelphia Union | 34 | 12 | 12 | 10 | 42 | 44 | −2 | 46 | |
| 15 | FC Dallas | 34 | 11 | 12 | 11 | 48 | 52 | −4 | 44 | |
| 16 | Columbus Crew | 34 | 12 | 17 | 5 | 42 | 46 | −4 | 41 | |
| 17 | Toronto FC | 34 | 6 | 17 | 11 | 30 | 47 | −17 | 29 | |
| 18 | Chivas USA | 34 | 6 | 20 | 8 | 30 | 67 | −37 | 26 | |
| 19 | D.C. United | 34 | 3 | 24 | 7 | 22 | 59 | −37 | 16 | CONCACAF Champions League |

Source: MLS
Rules for classification: 1) points; 2) head-to-head record; 3) goal difference; 4) number of goals scored
(C) MLS Cup Champion; (S) Supporters' Shield

=== Results summary ===
| Overall | | | | | | | | Home | | | | | | Away | | | | | |
| Pld | Pts | W | L | T | GF | GA | GD | W | L | T | GF | GA | GD | W | L | T | GF | GA | GD |
|---|---|---|---|---|---|---|---|---|---|---|---|---|---|---|---|---|---|---|---|
| 34 | 49 | 14 | 13 | 7 | 47 | 52 | −5 | 10 | 4 | 2 | 28 | 20 | +8 | 4 | 9 | 5 | 19 | 32 | −13 |

Last updated: October 27, 2013
Source: MLSsoccer.com standings
Pld = Matches played; Pts = Points; W = Matches won; T = Matches tied; L = Matches lost; GF = Goals for; GA = Goals against; GD = Goal difference

=== Results ===
| Round | 1 | 2 | 3 | 4 | 5 | 6 | 7 | 8 | 9 | 10 | 11 | 12 | 13 | 14 | 15 | 16 | 17 | 18 | 19 | 20 | 21 | 22 | 23 | 24 | 25 | 26 | 27 | 28 | 29 | 30 | 31 | 32 | 33 | 34 |
|---|---|---|---|---|---|---|---|---|---|---|---|---|---|---|---|---|---|---|---|---|---|---|---|---|---|---|---|---|---|---|---|---|---|---|
| Stadium | A | H | A | H | H | A | H | A | H | A | A | H | H | H | A | H | H | A | H | A | A | H | A | H | H | A | A | H | A | H | A | A | H | A |
| Result | L | L | T | L | W | L | W | L | L | L | T | W | T | W | W | W | L | L | W | T | W | W | L | W | T | L | T | W | L | T | W | W | W | L |

Updated to match(es) played on October 27, 2013. Source: MLS conference standings and MLS Supporters' Shield standings
A = Away; H = Home; W = Win; L = Loss; T = Tie

== Match results ==
Win Tie Loss

=== Preseason ===
| January 27, 2013 Preseason | Chicago Fire | 2–0 | Florida Gulf Coast University | Ave Maria, Florida |
| 15:00 CST (UTC-06) | Dominic Oduro 39'; Daniel Paladini 47' | Report | | Stadium: Ave Maria University |

| January 30, 2013 Preseason | Chicago Fire | 1–2 | Columbus Crew | Bradenton, Florida |
| 10:30 CST (UTC-06) | Neal Kitson (yellow card) 20'; Wells Thompson (yellow card) 31'; Hunter Jumper (yellow card) 61'; John Gallagher (yellow card) 72'; Yazid Atouba 89' | Report | Federico Higuaín 21' (pen.); Sercan Güvenışık 65' | Stadium: IMG Academy |

| February 5, 2013 Preseason | Chicago Fire | 1–1 | Chivas USA | Carson, California |
| 13:30 CST (UTC-06) | Yazid Atouba 52' | Report; 105 min match (45+30+30) | Miller Bolaños 39'; Mario de Luna (yellow card) 49' | Stadium: The Home Depot Center |

| February 9, 2013 Preseason | Chicago Fire Reserves | 1–1 | University of California Santa Barbara | Santa Barbara, California |
| 18:00 CST (UTC-06) | Michael Videira 12' | Report; 80 min match (40+40) | Charlie Miller 21' | Stadium: Harder Stadium |

| February 9, 2013 Preseason | Chicago Fire | 1–0 | San Jose Earthquakes | Santa Barbara, California |
| 20:00 CST (UTC-06) | Jeff Larentowicz 79' (pen.) | Report; 80 min match (40+40) | | Stadium: Harder Stadium |

| February 16, 2013 CCC | Chicago Fire | 3–2 | Houston Dynamo | Charleston, South Carolina |
| 16:00 CST (UTC-06) | Sherjill MacDonald 23' uncredited 27' (o.g.); Jeff Larentowicz 48'; Wells Thompson (yellow card) 89' | Report | Jermaine Taylor (yellow card) 10'; Brad Davis 15'; Mike Chabala (yellow card) 46'; Cam Weaver 64'; Je-Vaughn Watson (yellow card) 89' | Stadium: Blackbaud Stadium |

| February 17, 2013 Preseason | Chicago Fire Reserves | 4–2 | Coastal Carolina University | North Charleston, South Carolina |
| 12:00 CST (UTC-06) | Maicon Santos 13'; Alex 19'; Wells Thompson 31'; Colin Rolfe 56' | Report; 80 min match (40+40) | Jakub Stourac 2' unidentified 42' | Stadium: Charleston Southern University |

| February 20, 2013 CCC | Charleston Battery | 1–2 | Chicago Fire | Charleston, South Carolina |
| 18:15 CST (UTC-06) | Jose Cuevas 11'; Gibson Bardsley (yellow card) 54' | Report | Austin Berry 27'; Arne Friedrich (yellow card) 44'; Hunter Jumper (yellow card) 90'; Alex 90' | Stadium: Blackbaud Stadium |

| February 23, 2013 CCC | Chicago Fire | 1–1 | Vancouver Whitecaps FC | Charleston, South Carolina |
| 15:30 CST (UTC-06) | Jeff Larentowicz (yellow card) 55'; Maicon Santos 57'; Wells Thompson (yellow card) 83' | Report | Gershon Koffie (yellow card) 43'; Darren Mattocks 67' (pen.) | Stadium: Blackbaud Stadium |

=== Major League Soccer ===
Kickoff times are in CDT (UTC-05) unless shown otherwise

| Sunday, March 3, 2013 Match 1 | Los Angeles Galaxy | 4–0 | Chicago Fire | Carson, California |
| 16:00 CST (UTC-06) | Magee 38', 68', 74'; Dunivant (yellow card) 75'; Keane 80' | Report; National broadcast: UniMás | | Stadium: The Home Depot Center; Attendance: 20,124; Referee: Kevin Stott |

| Saturday, March 9, 2013 Match 2 | Chicago Fire | 0–1 | New England Revolution | Bridgeview, Illinois |
| 18:30 CST (UTC-06) | Larentowicz (yellow card) 55' | Report; National broadcast: NBC Sports | Bengtson 62'; Fagúndez (yellow card) 86' | Stadium: Toyota Park; Attendance: 13,242; Referee: Hilario Grajeda |

| Saturday, March 16, 2013 Match 3 | Sporting Kansas City | 0–0 | Chicago Fire | Kansas City, Kansas |
| 14:00 | Sinovic (yellow card) 47'; Rosell (yellow card) 93+' | Report; National broadcast: NBC Sports | Paladini (yellow card) 41'; Segares (yellow card) 77'; Santos (yellow card) 84'; Rolfe (yellow card) 91+' | Stadium: Sporting Park; Attendance: 19,868; Referee: Silviu Petrescu |

| Sunday, March 24, 2013 Match 4 | Chicago Fire | 1–4 | Chivas USA | Bridgeview, Illinois |
| 16:00 | Paladini (yellow card) 22'; Nyarko 64' | Report; National broadcast: UniMás | Burling (yellow card) 26'; Bowen (yellow card) 40'; Mejía 57'; Velázquez 73'; Agudelo 75'; Anibaba 88' (o.g.) | Stadium: Toyota Park; Attendance: 9,723; Referee: Sorin Stoica |

| Sunday, April 7, 2013 Match 5 | Chicago Fire | 3–1 | New York Red Bulls | Bridgeview, Illinois |
| 16:00 | Berry (yellow card) 16'; Paladini 44'; Santos 83', 89' | Report; National broadcast: ESPN2 | Olave 17'; Holgersson (yellow card) 51'; Luyindula (yellow card) 66' | Stadium: Toyota Park; Attendance: 12,557; Referee: Allen Chapman |

| Sunday, April 14, 2013 Match 6 | Houston Dynamo | 2–1 | Chicago Fire | Houston, Texas |
| 16:00 | Bruin 26'; Davis 81'; Ashe (yellow card) 93+' | Report; National broadcast: UniMás | Rolfe 29'; Daniel Paladini (yellow card) 55' | Stadium: BBVA Compass Stadium; Attendance: 18,942; Referee: Edvin Jurisevic |

| Saturday, April 20, 2013 Match 7 | Chicago Fire | 1–0 | Columbus Crew | Bridgeview, Illinois |
| 19:30 | Segares (yellow card) 6'; Thompson (yellow card) 13'; Larentowicz 83'; Paladini (yellow card) 87' | Report | Gláuber (yellow card) 85' | Stadium: Toyota Park; Attendance: 12,813; Referee: David Gantar |

| Saturday, April 27, 2013 Match 8 | Montreal Impact | 2–0 | Chicago Fire | Montreal, Quebec |
| 15:00 | Iapichino (yellow card) 43'; Romero 57'; Vaio (yellow card) 64' (goal) 76'; Lefèvre (yellow card) 74' | Report; National broadcast: NBC Sports | Larentowicz (red card) 63'; Johnson (yellow card) 64' | Stadium: Saputo Stadium; Attendance: 19,773; Referee: Fotis Bazakos |

| Saturday, May 11, 2013 Match 9 | Chicago Fire | 0–1 | Philadelphia Union | Bridgeview, Illinois |
| 12:30 | Duka (yellow card) 62' | Report; National broadcast: NBC Sports | McInerney 75' | Stadium: Toyota Park; Attendance: 12,205; Referee: Armando Villarreal |

| Saturday, May 18, 2013 Match 10 | Philadelphia Union | 1–0 | Chicago Fire | Chester, Pennsylvania |
| 18:30 | McInerney 3'; Carroll (yellow card) 56'; Williams (yellow card) 73'; Casey (yellow card) 91+' | Report | Wells Thompson (yellow card) 14' (yellow-red card) 63'; Jalil Anibaba (yellow card) 57' | Stadium: PPL Park; Attendance: 18,575; Referee: David Gantar |

| Saturday, May 25, 2013 Match 11 | Real Salt Lake | 1–1 | Chicago Fire | Sandy, Utah |
| 20:00 | Saborío 78'; Morales (yellow card) 94' | Report | Amarikwa 84'; Nyarko (yellow card) 85' | Stadium: Rio Tinto Stadium; Attendance: 18,293; Referee: Chris Penso |

| Sunday, June 2, 2013 Match 12 | Chicago Fire | 2–0 | D.C. United | Bridgeview, Illinois |
| 16:00 | DeLeon 9' (o.g.); Magee 85'; Duka (yellow card) 88' | Report; National broadcast: UniMás | | Stadium: Toyota Park; Attendance: 14,546; Referee: Juan Guzman |

| Saturday, June 8, 2013 Match 13 | Chicago Fire | 2–2 | Portland Timbers | Bridgeview, Illinois |
| 19:30 | Magee (yellow card) 60' (goal) 68'; Paladini 82' | Report | Valeri 33'; Chará (yellow card) 47'; Zemanski 58'; W. Johnson (yellow card) 83' | Stadium: Toyota Park; Attendance: 15,349; Referee: Jorge Gonzalez |

| Wednesday, June 19, 2013 Match 14 | Chicago Fire | 2–1 | Colorado Rapids | Bridgeview, Illinois |
| 19:30 | Magee 23' (pen.); Berry 47'; Larentowicz (yellow card) 60' | Report | Brown 17'; Mullan (yellow card) 70'; Sturgis (yellow card) 81'; Mera (yellow card) 84' | Stadium: Toyota Park; Attendance: 11,349; Referee: Edvin Jurisevic |

| Saturday, June 22, 2013 Match 15 | Columbus Crew | 1–2 | Chicago Fire | Columbus, Ohio |
| 19:00 | Higuaín 7' (pen.); Arrieta (yellow card) 45'; Sánchez (yellow card) 77' | Report | Lindpere (yellow card) 48'; Duka 52'; Magee 54'; Segares (yellow card) 60'; Soumaré (yellow card) 65' | Stadium: Columbus Crew Stadium; Attendance: 19,624; Referee: Drew Fischer |

| Wednesday, July 3, 2013 Match 16 | Chicago Fire | 3–2 | San Jose Earthquakes | Bridgeview, Illinois |
| 19:30 | Duka 36'; Larentowicz (yellow card) 39'; Nyarko 47'; Rolfe 84' | Report | Gordon 14'; Lindpere 72' (o.g.) | Stadium: Toyota Park; Attendance: 14,815; Referee: Chris Penso |

| Sunday, July 7, 2013 Match 17 | Chicago Fire | 1–2 | Sporting Kansas City | Bridgeview, Illinois |
| 14:00 | Magee 38'; Segares (yellow card) 57'; Anibaba (yellow card) 62'; Larentowicz (yellow card) 81'; Soumaré (yellow card) 85'; Paladini (red card) 90+3' | Report; National broadcast: ESPN | Feilhaber 6'; Zusi 8'; Olum (yellow card) 28'; Zusi (yellow card) 55' | Stadium: Toyota Park; Attendance: 17,735; Referee: Baldomero Toledo |

| Sunday, July 14, 2013 Match 18 | Vancouver Whitecaps FC | 3–1 | Chicago Fire | Vancouver, British Columbia |
| 18:00 | Sanvezzo 66', 71'; Manneh 84' | Report | Nyarko 94+' | Stadium: BC Place; Attendance: 20,206; Referee: Allen Chapman |

| Saturday, July 20, 2013 Match 19 | Chicago Fire | 4–1 | D.C. United | Bridgeview, Illinois |
| 19:30 | Rolfe 2', 45+1'; Lindpere 11'; Magee 56' (pen.); Rolfe (yellow card) 81'; Berry (yellow card) 90+1' | Report | Silva 58'; Porter 70'; Thorrington (yellow card) 90+2' | Stadium: Toyota Park; Attendance: 17,190; Referee: Fotis Bazakos |

| Saturday, July 27, 2013 Match 20 | Houston Dynamo | 1–1 | Chicago Fire | Houston, Texas |
| 19:00 | Barnes (yellow card) 36'; Weaver 61' | Report; National broadcast: NBC Sports | Lindpere (yellow card) 27'; Magee 63' | Stadium: BBVA Compass Stadium; Attendance: 22,039; Referee: Ricardo Salazar |

| Saturday, August 3, 2013 Match 21 | Philadelphia Union | 1–2 | Chicago Fire | Philadelphia, Pennsylvania |
| 18:30 | Williams 60'; Hoppenot (yellow card) 85' | Report | Nyarko 9'; Anibaba (yellow card) 16'; Lima (yellow card) 40'; Magee 75' | Stadium: PPL Park; Attendance: 18,295; Referee: David Gantar |

| Saturday, August 10, 2013 Match 22 | Chicago Fire | 2–1 | Montreal Impact | Bridgeview, Illinois |
| 19:30 | Lindpere 6'; Duka 23' | Report | Martins 57'; Paponi (yellow card) 80'; Ferrari (yellow card) 89' | Stadium: Toyota Park; Attendance: 17,297; Referee: Juan Guzman |

| Saturday, August 17, 2013 Match 23 | New England Revolution | 2–0 | Chicago Fire | Foxborough, Massachusetts |
| 18:30 | Agudelo 54'; Rowe 90+1'; Sène (red card) 90+5' | Report | Segares (yellow card) 34'; Soumaré (red card) 90+5' | Stadium: Gillette Stadium; Attendance: 14,630; Referee: Edwin Jurisevic |

| Friday, August 23, 2013 Match 24 | Chicago Fire | 1–0 | Sporting Kansas City | Bridgeview, Illinois |
| 19:30 | Jumper 13'; Lima (yellow card) 20'; Jumper (yellow card) 35' | Report; National broadcast: NBC Sports | Joseph (yellow card) 62'; Besler (yellow card) 88' | Stadium: Toyota Park; Attendance: 17,085; Referee: Mark Geiger |

| Sunday, September 1, 2013 Match 25 | Chicago Fire | 1–1 | Houston Dynamo | Bridgeview, Illinois |
| 14:00 | Boswell 36' (o.g.); Rolfe (yellow card) 40' | Report; National broadcast: UniMás | Creavalle (yellow card) 51'; Moffat 90' | Stadium: Toyota Park; Attendance: 17,808; Referee: Drew Fischer |

| Saturday, September 7, 2013 Match 26 | Seattle Sounders FC | 2–1 | Chicago Fire | Seattle, Washington |
| 21:00 | Neagle 40'; Rosales (yellow card) 48'; González (yellow card) 70'; Segares 89' (o.g.) | Report; National broadcast: NBC Sports | Magee 25'; Soumaré (yellow card) 29'; Duka (yellow card) 41'; Paladini (yellow card) 87' | Stadium: CenturyLink Field; Attendance: 38,503; Referee: Hilario Grajeda |

| Wednesday, September 11, 2013 Match 27 | Toronto FC | 1–1 | Chicago Fire | Toronto, Ontario |
| 18:30 | Earnshaw 23'; Convey (yellow card) 29'; Braun (yellow card) 45+1'; Hall (yellow card) 71'; Henry (yellow card) 90+1' | Report | Dilly Duka 20' | Stadium: BMO Field; Attendance: 15,217; Referee: Geoff Gamble |

| Saturday, September 14, 2013 Match 28 | Chicago Fire | 3–2 | New England Revolution | Bridgeview, Illinois |
| 19:30 | Anangonó 30'; Magee 55' (yellow card) 89'; Segares (yellow card) 61'; Larentowicz (yellow card) 69'; Lima 86' | Report | Rowe 9'; Sène 45+1' | Stadium: Toyota Park; Attendance: 17,104; Referee: Ismail Elfath |

| Saturday, September 21, 2013 Match 29 | Columbus Crew | 3–0 | Chicago Fire | Columbus, Ohio |
| 18:30 | Oduro 15'; Marshall (yellow card) 38'; Higuaín 70'; Añor 76'; Arrieta (yellow card) 76' | Report | Bakary Soumaré (red card) 29' | Stadium: Columbus Crew Stadium; Attendance: 19,010; Referee: Juan Guzman |

| Saturday, September 28, 2013 Match 30 | Chicago Fire | 2–2 | Montreal Impact | Bridgeview, Illinois |
| 19:30 | Vaio 25'; Arnaud (yellow card) 70'; Tissot 87' | Report | Pause (yellow card) 19'; Magee 57', 73' (yellow card) 84' | Stadium: Toyota Park; Attendance: 18,173; Referee: Armando Villarreal |

| Friday, October 4, 2013 Match 31 | D.C. United | 0–3 | Chicago Fire | Washington, D.C. |
| 19:00 | Nyassi (yellow card) 34'; Riley (yellow card) 36'; Kitchen (yellow card) 84' | Report; National broadcast: NBC Sports | Larentowicz 24'; Soumaré 26'; Amarikwa 89' | Stadium: RFK Memorial Stadium; Attendance: 13,949; Referee: Ricardo Salazar |

| Saturday, October 12, 2013 Match 32 | FC Dallas | 2–3 | Chicago Fire | Frisco, Texas |
| 19:30 | Jackson (yellow card) 22'; Cooper 63', 75' (pen.); Castillo (yellow card) 84' | Report | Anangonó 25'; Magee 42'; Anibaba 52' | Stadium: Toyota Stadium; Attendance: 14,087; Referee: Kevin Stott |

| Saturday, October 19, 2013 Match 33 | Chicago Fire | 1–0 | Toronto FC | Bridgeview, Illinois |
| 19:30 | Larentowicz (yellow card) 57'; Magee 64' (pen.); Segares (yellow card) 70' | Report | Morgan (yellow card) 54' | Stadium: Toyota Park; Attendance: 19,889; Referee: Edvin Jurisevic |

| Sunday, October 27, 2013 Match 34 | New York Red Bulls | 5–2 | Chicago Fire | Harrison, New Jersey |
| 16:00 | Henry 24'; Carney (yellow card) 37'; Sekagya 49'; Sam 56'; Alexander 77'; Steele 84' | Report; National broadcast: UniMás | Magee 6'; Anangonó (yellow card) 52'; Soumaré (yellow card) 77'; Amarikwa 90' | Stadium: Red Bull Arena; Attendance: 25,219; Referee: Ismail Elfath |

=== U.S. Open Cup ===
Kickoff times are in CDT (UTC-05)

| Wednesday, May 29, 2013 Third Round | Charlotte Eagles | 0–2 | Chicago Fire | Rock Hill, South Carolina |
| 18:00 | Mike Magee 11'; Bakary Soumaré (yellow card) 39'; Chris Rolfe 57' | Report | | Stadium: Eagle Field, Winthrop University |

| Wednesday, June 13, 2013 Fourth Round | Chicago Fire | 2–1 | Columbus Crew | Bridgeview, Illinois |
| 12:00 | Mike Magee 28' (yellow card) 71'; Patrick Nyarko 78' (yellow card) 82'; Bakary Soumaré (yellow card) 90' | Report | Konrad Warzycha 22' (yellow card) 71' | Stadium: Toyota Park; Attendance: free admission |
Note: The match, originally scheduled for June 12th at 7:30 pm, was moved to June 13th at 12 noon due to inclement weather and lightning in the area. The admission was free.

| Wednesday, June 26, 2013 Quarterfinals | Chicago Fire | 5–1 | Orlando City | Bridgeview, Illinois |
| 19:30 | Chris Rolfe 6', 63'; Alex (yellow card) 24'; Patrick Nyarko 69'; Gonzalo Segares (yellow card) 73'; Mike Magee 83'; Joel Lindpere 91+' | Report | Christian Duke (yellow card) 21'; Rob Valentino 51'; Yann Songo'o (red card) 71'; Bryan Burke (yellow card) 76'; Adama Mbengue (red card) 86' | Stadium: Toyota Park |

| Wednesday, August 7, 2013 Semifinals | Chicago Fire | 0–2 | D.C. United | Bridgeview, Illinois |
| 19:30 | | Report | Dwayne De Rosario 44'; Nick DeLeon 48' | Stadium: Toyota Park; Referee: Jair Marrufo |

=== Friendlies ===
Kickoff times are in CDT (UTC-05)

| Friday, March 29, 2013 | Chicago Fire | 0–1 | Minnesota United FC | Bridgeview, Illinois |
| 10:00 | Leo Lelis (yellow card) 90' (red card) 93+' | Report | Simone Bracalello (yellow card) 55'; Miguel Ibarra 73' | Stadium: Toyota Park Practice Field; Attendance: free |

| Wednesday, July 10, 2013 | Chicago Fire | 2–3 | (Mexico) Club América | Bridgeview, Illinois |
| 19:30 | Daniel Paladini 19' (yellow card) 24'; Shaun Francis (yellow card) 51'; Sherjill MacDonald 91+' | Report | Luis Gabriel Rey 25'; Erik Pimentel (yellow card) 31'; Paul Aguilar (yellow card) 34'; Jesús Antonio Leal (yellow card) 41'; Christian Bermúdez 63' (pen.); Antonio López Ojeda 83' (pen.) | Stadium: Toyota Park; Attendance: 20,042; Referee: Ted Unkel |

== Recognition ==
=== Leading scorers ===
MLS regular season
| Rank | Scorer | Goals | Assists |
|---|---|---|---|
| 1 | (United States) Mike Magee | 15 | 4 |
| 2 | (Ghana) Patrick Nyarko | 4 | 4 |
| 3 | (United States) Dilly Duka | 4 | 3 |
| 4 | (United States) Chris Rolfe | 4 | 1 |
| 5 | (United States) Quincy Amarikwa | 3 | 0 |
| 6 | (Estonia) Joel Lindpere | 2 | 8 |
| 7 | (United States) Jeff Larentowicz | 2 | 4 |
| 8 | (United States) Daniel Paladini | 2 | 3 |
| 9 | (Brazil) Maicon Santos | 2 | 2 |
| 10 | (Ecuador) Juan Luis Anangonó | 2 | 1 |
| 11 | (United States) Jalil Anibaba | 1 | 3 |
| 12 | (United States) Austin Berry | 1 | 2 |
| 13 | (United States) Hunter Jumper | 1 | 1 |
| 13 | (Brazil) Alex | 1 | 1 |
| 15 | (Mali) Bakary Soumaré | 1 | 0 |
| 16 | (Netherlands) Sherjill MacDonald | 0 | 1 |
| 16 | (Costa Rica) Gonzalo Segares | 0 | 1 |

U.S. Open Cup
| Rank | Scorer | Goals | Assists |
|---|---|---|---|
| 1 | (United States) Mike Magee | 3 | 2 |
| 2 | (United States) Chris Rolfe | 3 | 1 |
| 3 | (Ghana) Patrick Nyarko | 2 | 0 |
| 4 | (Estonia) Joel Lindpere | 1 | 0 |
| 5 | (Costa Rica) Gonzalo Segares | 0 | 2 |
| 6 | (United States) Dilly Duka | 0 | 1 |
| 6 | (United States) Jeff Larentowicz | 0 | 1 |
| 6 | (Brazil) Maicon Santos | 0 | 1 |

Updated to match played on October 27, 2013.
Source: MLSsoccer.com statistics - 2013 Chicago Fire

=== MLS Team of the week ===
| Week | Player | Position | Report |
|---|---|---|---|
| 6 | (United States) Daniel Paladini | MF | Report |
| 6 | (Brazil) Maicon Santos | FW | Report |
| 8 | (United States) Austin Berry | DF | Report |
| 15 | (Brazil) Alex | MF | Report |
| 17 | (United States) Dilly Duka | MF | Report |
| 17 | (United States) Mike Magee | FW | Report |
| 17 | (United States) Frank Klopas | Coach | Report |
| 21 | (Estonia) Joel Lindpere | MF | Report |
| 21 | (United States) Chris Rolfe | FW | Report |
| 24 | (United States) Sean Johnson | GK | Report |
| 26 | (United States) Jalil Anibaba | DF | Report |
| 26 | (United States) Hunter Jumper | DF | Report |
| 29 | (Ecuador) Juan Luis Anangonó | FW | Report |
| 29 | (United States) Frank Klopas | Coach | Report |
| 31 | (United States) Mike Magee | FW | Report |
| 32 | (United States) Sean Johnson | GK | Report |
| 32 | (Mali) Bakary Soumaré | DF | Report |
| 33 | (United States) Jeff Larentowicz | MF | Report |
| 33 | (United States) Frank Klopas | Coach | Report |
| 34 | (United States) Mike Magee | FW | Report |

=== MLS Player of the week ===
| Week | Player | Report |
|---|---|---|
| 21 | (United States) Chris Rolfe | POTW |

=== MLS Player of the month ===
| Month | Player | Report |
|---|---|---|
| June | (United States) Mike Magee | POTM |

=== MLS All-star game ===
| Position | Player | Report |
|---|---|---|
| Forward | (United States) Mike Magee | Fan XI |

=== Team annual award winners ===
Forward Mike Magee was named the team's Most Valuable Player, as well as the Golden Boot winner. Goalkeeper Sean Johnson was named the Defender of the year. These annual team award winners were selected by local media.

Daniel Paladini won the club's Goal of the Year award via online fan voting.

=== MLS season award winners ===
Forward Mike Magee was named to the MLS Best XI and won the MLS Most Valuable Player Award.

== Kits ==
| Home | Home alt. 1 | Home alt. 2 | Away |

| Type | Shirt | Shorts | Socks | First appearance / Info |
|---|---|---|---|---|
| Home | Red with white lettering | Red | Red | |
| Home alt. 1 | Red with stars-and-stripes lettering | Navy blue | White | Independence Day special; worn at home MLS game on July 3 against San Jose Earthquakes |
| Home alt. 2 | Navy blue with pink lettering | Navy blue | Pink | Breast cancer awareness special; away kit worn at home MLS game on October 19 against Toronto FC |
| Away | Navy blue with white lettering | Navy blue | Navy blue | |

=== Third kit ===
On October 8, 2013 the club unveiled the third kit to be worn in the 2014 season. The municipal-themed design named "Heart on Your Sleeve" incorporated the city flag as well as the iconic Chicago skyline. The winning design was selected via a fan vote online.

== Miscellany ==
=== International roster slots ===
On January 4, 2013 Chicago has traded a 2013 International Roster Slot to New York Red Bulls in exchange for the midfielder Joel Lindpere. On January 16, 2013 Chicago has traded another 2013 International Roster Slot to Colorado Rapids in exchange for Jeff Larentowicz, 11th pick in the 2013 MLS SuperDraft and allocation money. Subsequently, Chicago Fire had six MLS International Roster Slots for use in the 2013 season.

=== Future draft pick trades ===
Future picks acquired: 2014 MLS SuperDraft round 4 pick from Real Salt Lake in exchange for Kwame Watson-Siriboe.
Future picks traded: 2014 MLS SuperDraft second-round pick and allocation money to Philadelphia Union in exchange for defender Bakary Soumaré. 2014 MLS Supplemental Draft round 1 (which later was merged into 2014 MLS SuperDraft and became round 3) pick to Toronto FC in exchange for Quincy Amarikwa.

=== MLS rights to other players ===
On February 4, 2013 Chicago Fire acquired the MLS rights to Robbie Rogers from Columbus Crew and subsequently traded them to Los Angeles Galaxy in exchange for Mike Magee.
