= Austin Berry (soccer) =

American soccer player

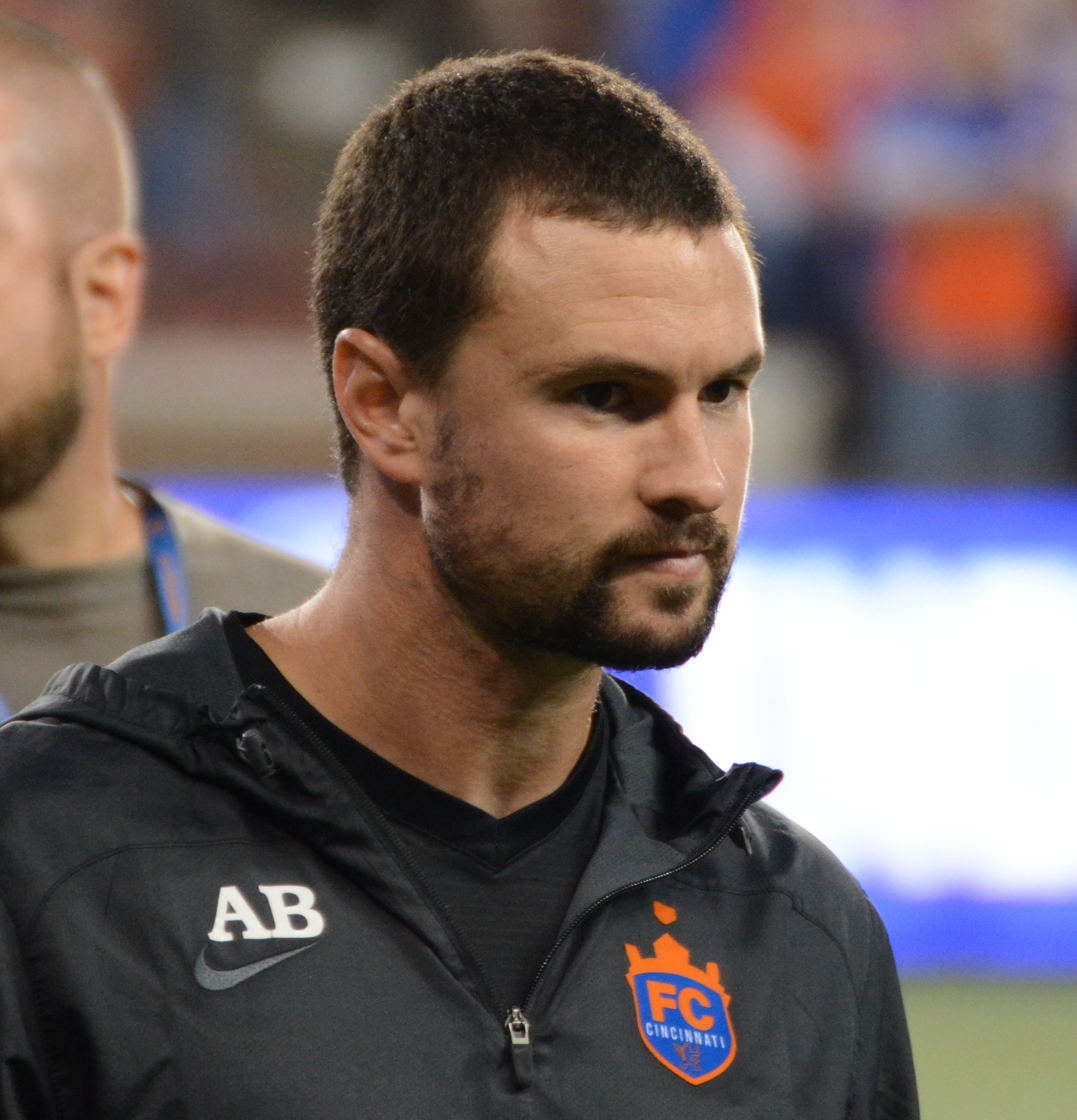
- Berry with FC Cincinnati in 2018

Personal information
- Full name: Gregory Austin Berry
- Date of birth: October 6, 1988 (age 38)
- Place of birth: Cincinnati, Ohio, United States
- Height: 6 ft 2 in (1.88 m)
- Position: Defender

College career
Years	Team	Apps	(Gls)
2007–2011	Louisville Cardinals	94	(11)

Senior career*
Years	Team	Apps	(Gls)
2010	Chicago Fire Premier	16	(1)
2012–2013	Chicago Fire	62	(4)
2014–2015	Philadelphia Union	6	(0)
2015	→ FC Anyang (loan)	34	(1)
2016–2017	FC Cincinnati	47	(4)
Total		168	(10)

Managerial career
- 2018–: FC Cincinnati (strength & conditioning)
- * Club domestic league appearances and goals

Gregory Austin Berry (born October 6, 1988) is an American former soccer defender from Cincinnati, Ohio. After playing for the Louisville Cardinals in college, he was a first-round pick in the 2012 MLS SuperDraft. He signed with Chicago Fire, and was named MLS Rookie of the Year after his first season. He played another season with Chicago before he was traded to Philadelphia Union. After spending his second season with Philadelphia on loan to the South Korean club FC Anyang, Berry returned to his hometown to play for the newly formed club FC Cincinnati in the lower division United Soccer League. He served as FC Cincinnati's team captain for two seasons before retiring from his playing career and accepting a position as the club's strength and conditioning coach.

== Youth career ==
Born in Cincinnati, Ohio, he attended the Summit Country Day School for high school where he played four fall seasons of soccer. With a 14–1–1 record during his senior year, Berry contributed 10 goals, 6 assists, and led his team to the Regional finals. He earned first team all-state, first team Miami Valley Conference, Division III Player of the Year, and was named a Cincinnati Enquirer All-Star. Berry played college soccer at the University of Louisville between 2007 and 2011. During his time at Louisville, Berry was named an NSCAA All-American in 2010 and 2011, Soccer America and College Soccer News All-American honors, Earned Big East Defensive Player of the Year honors in 2010, All-BIG EAST First Team and Big East All Tournament Team in 2010 and 2011. In 2010, he led the University of Louisville to the national championship game and was named to the College Cup All Tournament Team. Berry finished his career at Louisville with 94 appearances and 11 goals.

In 2010, Berry played for the USL Premier Development League team Chicago Fire Premier.

== Professional career ==
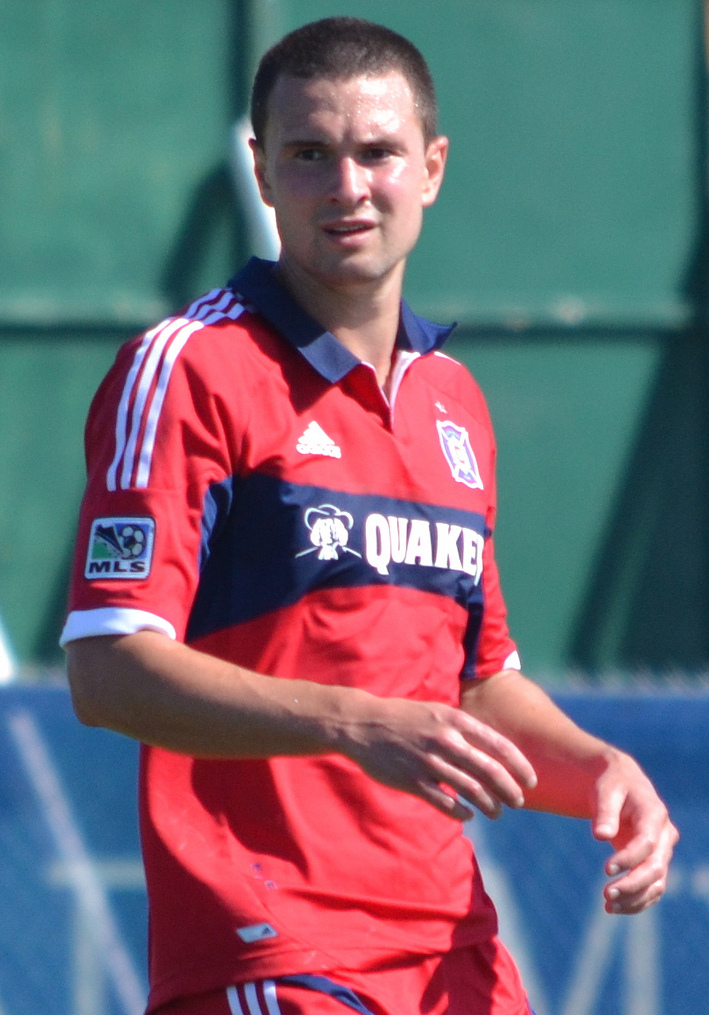
Berry playing with Chicago Fire in 2013

=== Chicago Fire ===
The Chicago Fire selected Berry in the first round (No. 9 overall) of the 2012 MLS SuperDraft. Berry made his first MLS appearance against Chivas USA. After conceding a penalty, Berry scored his first MLS goal two minutes later off a throw-in deep in the Chivas box. Berry earned MLS team of the week honors after the Chivas game and was named the Player of the Game in his second match against Real Salt Lake. During the 2012 season, he started 28 games and scored three goals and won the MLS Rookie of the Year Award.

Berry started and played 62 consecutive full games for the Fire, falling just short of the MLS record.

=== Philadelphia Union and FC Anyang ===
Prior to the 2014 season, Berry was traded to Philadelphia Union in exchange for allocation money. Berry was the opening day starter at centerback for the Union in 2014 but suffered a hamstring injury in the second game. Due to injury, Berry was limited to only 6 games for the Union.

Berry was loaned to South Korea's FC Anyang ahead of the 2015 season.

=== FC Cincinnati ===
In December 2015, Berry was announced as one of the first eleven signings for United Soccer League club FC Cincinnati, which played its first season in 2016. He served as the team's captain from the start of the season. Berry scored a goal in the club's inaugural home match, a 2–1 win over Charlotte Independence. Berry's goal earned him an honorable mention on the USL Team of the Week. On April 29, Berry suffered a quadriceps injury during training, which ultimately caused him to miss roughly a third of the season. Berry's performance in a 1–0 road victory against Pittsburgh Riverhounds earned him a spot on the final USL Team of the Week of 2016. At the end of the regular season, FC Cincinnati honored Berry with the Cincinnatus Award for demonstrating "outstanding leadership, service to the great good, civic virtue, lack of personal ambition, and modesty."

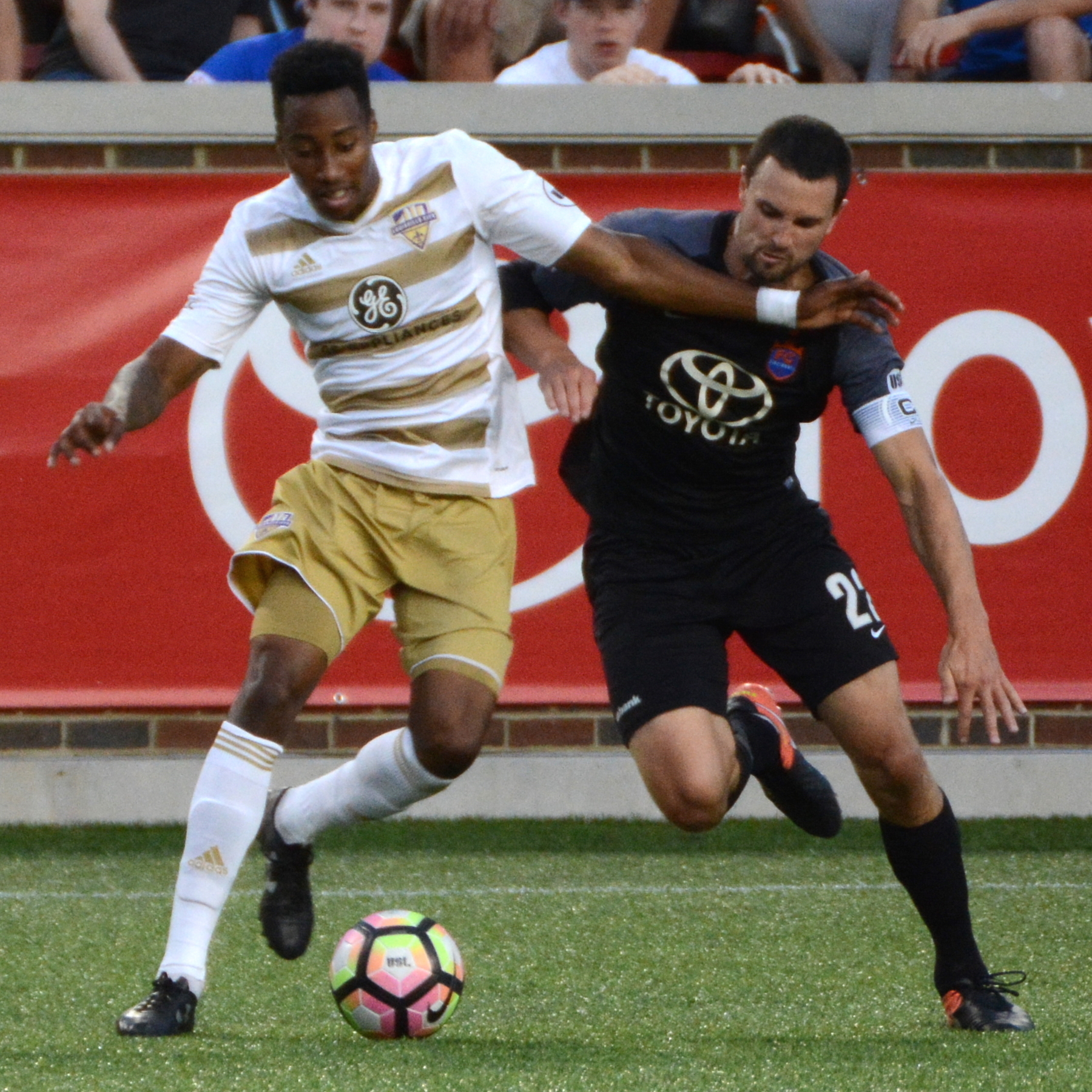
Mark-Anthony Kaye of Louisville City FC battling Berry for possession in a 2017 U.S. Open Cup match

In November 2016, FC Cincinnati announced Berry as one of 15 players that would be returning for the 2017 season. He remained the team's captain throughout the 2017 season. On March 4, Berry suffered a sprained elbow during a pre-season match against Sacramento Republic FC. He was expected to be out for 2–3 weeks and miss one or two of the club's first USL matches of the year. However, Berry recovered more quickly and played a full 90 minutes in the club's USL opener at Charleston Battery. Berry remained a core player in Cincinnati's 2017 lineup, and started in 27 of his 29 total league appearances. He also made five appearances in the club's championship run in the 2017 U.S. Open Cup, and scored a goal against New York Red Bulls in the semifinals.

In December 2017, FC Cincinnati announced that Berry would be retiring from his playing career and accepting a position on the technical staff. He is now the team's strength and conditioning coach. His captain role was filled by Dekel Keinan, a defender signed for the 2018 season.

== Personal life ==
Berry's daughter, Lilly Newton Berry, was born on January 30, 2020.

== Career statistics ==
Appearances and goals by club, season and competition
Club	Season	League			National Cup		League Cup		Total	
Club	Season	Division	Apps	Goals	Apps	Goals	Apps	Goals	Apps	Goals
Chicago Fire Premier	2010	USL Premier Development League	16	1	–		–		16	1
Chicago Fire	2012	Major League Soccer	28	3	1	0	1	0	30	3
Chicago Fire	2013	Major League Soccer	34	1	4	0	0	0	38	1
Chicago Fire	Total		62	4	5	0	1	0	68	4
Philadelphia Union	2014	Major League Soccer	6	0	0	0	0	0	6	0
FC Anyang (loan)	2015	K League 2	34	1	0	0	0	0	34	1
FC Cincinnati	2016	United Soccer League	20	3	0	0	1	0	21	3
FC Cincinnati	2017	United Soccer League	30	1	6	1	1	0	37	2
FC Cincinnati	Total		50	4	6	1	2	0	58	5
Career total			168	10	11	1	3	0	182	11

== Honors ==
Individual

- MLS Rookie of the Year: 2012
