= Jalil Anibaba =

American soccer player

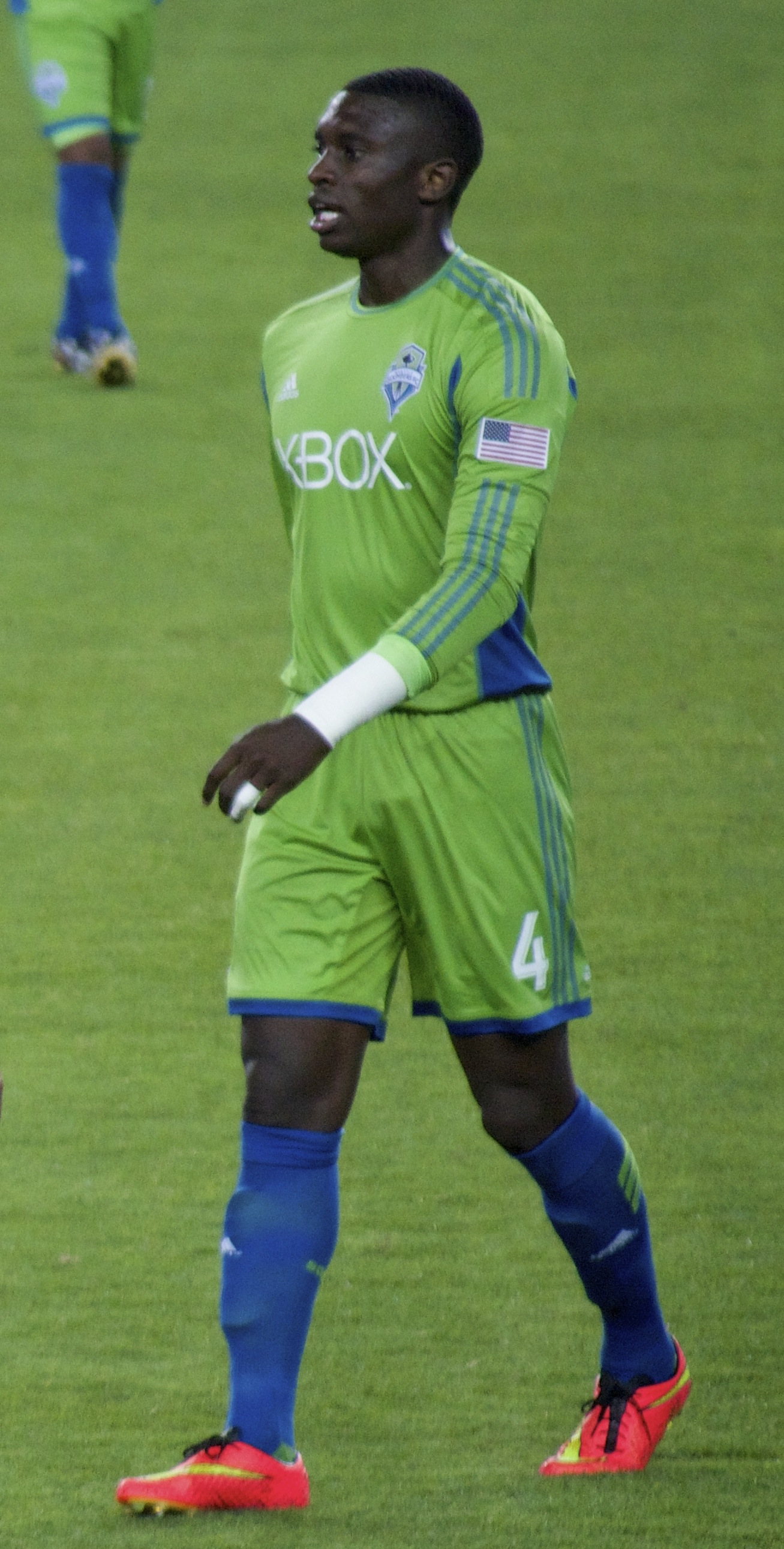
- Anibaba playing for Seattle Sounders FC in 2014

Personal information
- Full name: Jalil Anibaba
- Date of birth: October 19, 1988 (age 38)
- Place of birth: Davis, California, U.S.
- Height: 6 ft 0 in (1.83 m)
- Position: Defender

College career
Years	Team	Apps	(Gls)
2007–2009	Santa Clara Broncos	61	(3)
2010	North Carolina Tar Heels	24	(0)

Senior career*
Years	Team	Apps	(Gls)
2010	Carolina Dynamo	12	(0)
2011–2013	Chicago Fire	96	(4)
2014	Seattle Sounders FC	16	(0)
2015	Sporting Kansas City	16	(1)
2016–2017	Houston Dynamo	38	(0)
2018–2019	New England Revolution	53	(1)
2020–2021	Nashville SC	21	(1)
2022	Columbus Crew	5	(0)
Total		257	(7)

International career^{‡}
2007	United States U18	3	(0)
2007	United States U20	1	(0)
- * Club domestic league appearances and goals as of 20:23, 3 September 2022 (UTC) ‡ National team caps and goals as of August 4, 2012

Jalil Anibaba (/dʒəˈliːl ɑːniˈbɑːbə/; born October 19, 1988) is an American former professional soccer player who last played in Major League Soccer for Columbus Crew. He is currently a club ambassador for Nashville SC.

== Career ==
=== College and amateur ===
Anibaba was born in Davis, California where he attended Davis Senior High School, where in his senior season he was the California Gatorade Soccer Player of the year, and played college soccer at Santa Clara University for the first three years of his college career. In 2009, Anibaba captained the Broncos, who were selected for the National Soccer Coaches Association of America (NSCAA) All-West Region team.

For his senior season he transferred to the University of North Carolina, where he won numerous awards, including NSCAA Second Team All-America, NSCAA First Team All-Region, First Team All-ACC, ACC All-Tournament Team and 2007 WCC Freshman of the Year.

Anibaba made twelve appearances for USL Premier Development League club Carolina Dynamo during their 2010 season.

=== Professional ===
On January 14, 2011, Anibaba was drafted #9 overall in the 2011 MLS SuperDraft by the Chicago Fire. He made his professional debut on March 19, 2011, in Chicago's first game of the 2011 MLS season, a 1–1 tie with FC Dallas, and scored his first professional goal – a 40-yard screamer – on March 30, 2011, in a 2–1 victory over the Colorado Rapids in the qualifying round of the Lamar Hunt US Open Cup. Anibaba would go on to tally two more goals in the 2011 season finale, heading home two strikes in the space of 19 minutes in a 3–2 win vs. Columbus Crew on October 22, 2011. Anibaba closed out his first season in MLS setting a club record for regular season appearances by a rookie with 29 and had his March 30 strike vs. Colorado voted the team's "Goal of the Year" by the team's fans following the campaign.

After three seasons with Chicago, Anibaba was traded in January 2014 with the #8 pick in the 2014 MLS SuperDraft and a conditional third-round selection in the 2015 MLS SuperDraft to Seattle Sounders FC in exchange for the #13 pick in the 2014 SuperDraft, defender Jhon Kennedy Hurtado, and defender Patrick Ianni.

On December 10, 2014, Anibaba was selected by Orlando City SC with the fifth pick in the 2014 MLS Expansion Draft. After the draft, Anibaba was shipped to Sporting Kansas City as part of the trade for Aurelien Collin. Anibaba was dropped by Sporting Kansas City on November 25, 2015.

Anibaba was released by Kansas City at the end of the 2015 MLS season and later signed with the Houston Dynamo. His option was declined following the 2017 season; he signed with the New England Revolution in the 2018 preseason. Anibaba quickly became a fan-favorite in New England, partly due to his passionate celebrations following successful blocks and tackles. On March 30, 2019, Anibaba scored his only goal for the Revs in a 2–1 victory over Minnesota United FC.

On November 19, 2019, Anibaba was selected by MLS expansion side Nashville SC in the 2019 MLS Expansion Draft. Following the 2021 season Anibaba's contract expired with Nashville.

On January 14, 2022, Anibaba signed a 1-year deal as a free agent with Columbus Crew.

On Monday, February 13, 2023, Anibaba announced his retirement from professional soccer, after which he was named the first-ever club ambassador for Nashville SC.

== Personal life ==
Anibaba was born in the United States and is of Nigerian descent. His brother Jammil and cousin Sule played college soccer during the 2000s for the UC Davis Aggies, while half brother Josh Reese played American football for UC Davis Aggies.

== Career statistics ==
=== Club ===
As of match played 25 November 2020

Appearances and goals by club, season and competition
Club	Season	League			National Cup		Other		Total	
Club	Season	Division	Apps	Goals	Apps	Goals	Apps	Goals	Apps	Goals
Carolina Dynamo	2010	PDL	12	0	—		—		12	0
Chicago Fire	2011	MLS	29	2	4	0	—		33	2
Chicago Fire	2012	MLS	33	1	1	0	1 (Note: Appearance(s) in MLS Cup Playoffs)	0	35	1
Chicago Fire	2013	MLS	34	1	4	0	—		38	1
Chicago Fire	Total		96	4	9	0	1	0	106	4
Seattle Sounders FC	2014	MLS	16	0	4	0	1	0	21	0
Sporting Kansas City	2015	MLS	16	1	1	0	0	0	17	1
Houston Dynamo	2016	MLS	30	0	2	0	—		32	0
Houston Dynamo	2017	MLS	8	0	2	0	4	0	14	0
Houston Dynamo	Total		38	0	4	0	4	0	46	0
New England Revolution	2018	MLS	31	0	1	0	—		32	0
New England Revolution	2019	MLS	22	1	2	0	0	0	24	1
New England Revolution	Total		53	1	3	0	0	0	56	1
Nashville SC	2020	MLS	12	0	—		1	0	13	0
Career total			243	6	21	0	7	0	271	6
