= Alex (footballer, born December 1988) =

Brazilian footballer

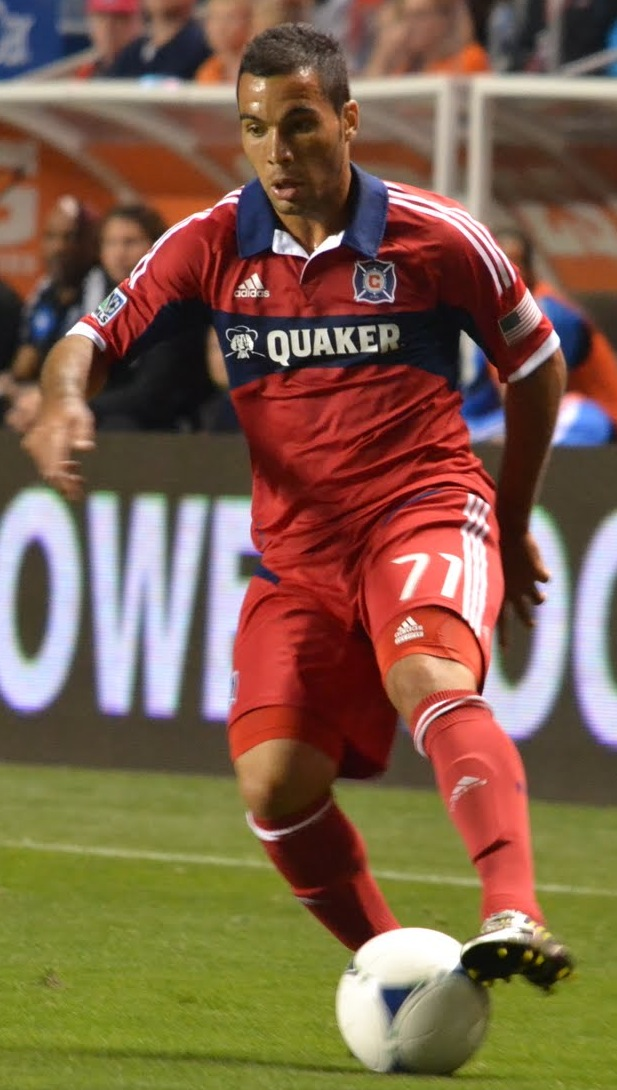
- Alex with Chicago Fire in 2012

Personal information
- Full name: Alexandre Monteiro de Lima
- Date of birth: 15 December 1988 (age 37)
- Place of birth: São Paulo, Brazil
- Height: 1.74 m (5 ft 9 in)
- Position: Midfielder

Youth career
- Grêmio Mauaense

Senior career*
Years	Team	Apps	(Gls)
2008–2012	Wohlen	68	(6)
2009–2010	→ Gossau (loan)	18	(2)
2012–2015	Chicago Fire	76	(3)
2015–2017	Houston Dynamo	82	(9)
2018–2019	Suwon	30	(5)
2019–2020	Anyang	31	(13)
2020	Ho Chi Minh City	3	(0)
2020–2022	Jamshedpur	41	(1)
2022–2023	East Bengal	17	(1)
- * Club domestic league appearances and goals as of 15:57, 25 February 2023 (UTC)

Alexandre Monteiro de Lima (born 15 December 1988), simply known as Alex, is a Brazilian professional footballer who plays as a midfielder.

== Club career ==
Alex began his career in the youth system of Grêmio Mauaense. In 2008, he left Brazil to sign with FC Wohlen in Switzerland. During the 2009–10 season, he was loaned to Gossau. He returned to Wohlen the following season and became a regular starter for the club as he made 48 league appearances and scored six goals in two seasons.

On April 26, 2012, Alex signed a deal with Chicago Fire of Major League Soccer. He officially joined the squad on June 27, 2012, with the opening of the summer transfer window. As of April 13, 2015, he was traded to the Houston Dynamo.

Alex was released by Houston at the end of their 2017 season. He later signed for K League 2 side Suwon FC.

In 2020, he moved to India and signed for the Indian Super League side Jamshedpur FC, for which he appeared in 11 matches of the 2020–21 season. He scored his first goal on 6 December 2021 against ATK Mohun Bagan in their 2–1 win.

=== East Bengal ===
In August 2022, Alex was announced as one of the five foreigners signed by East Bengal for the upcoming season.

On 22 August, he made his debut against Indian Navy in the Durand Cup, which ended in a 0–0 stalemate. He came on as a half-time substitute for Mobashir Rahman.

== Career statistics ==
=== Club ===
As of 17 April 2023

Club	Season	League			National Cup		League Cup		Continental		Total	
Club	Season	Division	Apps	Goals	Apps	Goals	Apps	Goals	Apps	Goals	Apps	Goals
Wohlen	2008–09	Swiss Challenge League	20	0	0	0	—		—		20	0
Wohlen	2010–11	Swiss Challenge League	23	4	3 (Note: Appearance(s) in Swiss Cup)	0	—		—		24	4
Wohlen	2011–12	Swiss Challenge League	25	2	3	1	—		—		26	3
Wohlen	Wohlen total		68	6	6	1	0	0	0	0	74	7
Gossau (loan)	2009–10	Swiss Challenge League	18	2	0	0	—		—		18	2
Chicago Fire	2012	Major League Soccer	18	3	0	0	—		—		18	3
Chicago Fire	2013	Major League Soccer	30	1	4 (Note: Appearance(s) in U.S. Open Cup)	0	—		—		34	1
Chicago Fire	2014	Major League Soccer	28	0	3	1	—		—		31	1
Chicago Fire	2015	Major League Soccer	1	0	0	0	—		—		1	0
Chicago Fire	Chicago Fire total		77	4	7	1	0	0	0	0	84	5
Houston Dynamo	2015	Major League Soccer	15	2	2	0	—		—		17	2
Houston Dynamo	2016	Major League Soccer	30	5	3	2	—		—		33	7
Houston Dynamo	2017	Major League Soccer	37	2	1	0	—		—		38	2
Houston Dynamo	Houston Dynamo total		82	9	6	2	0	0	0	0	88	11
Suwon	2018	K League 2	30	5	1 (Note: Appearance(s) in Korean FA Cup)	1	—		—		31	6
Anyang	2019	K League 2	33	13	3	0	—		—		36	13
Ho Chi Minh City	2020	V.League 1	3	0	0	0	—		—		3	0
Jamshedpur	2020–21	Indian Super League	19	0	0	0	—		—		19	0
Jamshedpur	2021–22	Indian Super League	22	1	0	0	—		—		22	1
Jamshedpur	Jamshedpur total		41	1	0	0	0	0	0	0	41	1
East Bengal	2022–23	Indian Super League	17	1	3 (Note: Appearance(s) in Super Cup)	0	4 (Note: Appearance(s) in Durand Cup)	0	—		24	1
Career total			369	41	26	5	4	0	0	0	399	46

== Honours ==
Jamshedpur

- Indian Super League Premiers: 2021–22

== Personal life ==
Alex received his U.S. green card in June 2014. This qualifies him as a domestic player for MLS roster purposes.
