= Kenyi Adachi =

Mexican footballer (born 1993)

Personal information
- Date of birth: January 19, 1993 (age 33)
- Place of birth: Colima, Mexico

Senior career*
Years	Team	Apps	(Gls)
- Real Burgos CF
- * Club domestic league appearances and goals

Kenyi Fernando Adachi García (born 19 January 1993) is a Mexican professional footballer who currently plays for Real Burgos CF. He is of Japanese descent.
