= Gonzalo Segares =

Costa Rican footballer (born 1982)

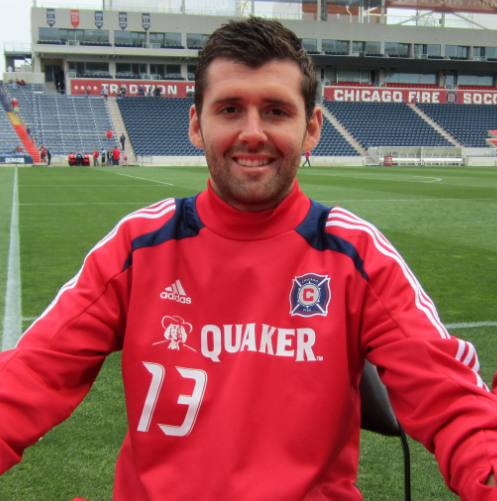
- Segares with Chicago Fire in 2012

Personal information
- Full name: Gonzalo Segares González
- Date of birth: October 13, 1982 (age 44)
- Place of birth: San José, Costa Rica
- Height: 5 ft 10 in (1.78 m)
- Position: Defender

Team information
- Current team: United States U17 (head coach)

Youth career
- 2000–2001: Saprissa

College career
Years	Team	Apps	(Gls)
2001–2004	VCU Rams	84	(16)

Senior career*
Years	Team	Apps	(Gls)
2003	Williamsburg Legacy	5	(0)
2005–2009	Chicago Fire	108	(8)
2010	Apollon Limassol	12	(0)
2010–2014	Chicago Fire	123	(3)
Total		248	(11)

International career
2007–2011	Costa Rica	19	(0)

Managerial career
- 2015–2016: Chicago Fire (academy)
- 2016–2019: Chicago FC United (academy)
- 2020–2021: United States U15
- 2021–: United States U17
- * Club domestic league appearances and goals

Gonzalo Segares González (born October 13, 1982) is a Costa Rican former professional footballer who spent most of his career with Major League Soccer club Chicago Fire. He currently serves as head coach for the United States U17 national team.

== Playing career ==
=== Youth and college ===
Segares started his career playing in Saprissa's minor league system, before being awarded with a scholarship to play college soccer at Virginia Commonwealth University from 2001 to 2004. Segares was a strong player from his debut, starting all 83 games he played in his four seasons. He registered 16 goals and 10 assists from the back in his four years with the team, was a first-team All-CAA selection his final three years, and was a first team All-American and Hermann Trophy finalist as a senior. During this time he also played with the Williamsburg Legacy in the USL Premier Development League.

=== Professional ===
Segares began his professional career with the Chicago Fire as a 2005 SuperDraft third round selection, and quickly proved himself during his rookie campaign. Segares was in the Fire's starting eleven for the first three games of the 2006 campaign until an ankle injury sidelined the young defender for a month of action. Upon his return, Segares came back with a vengeance, starting 19 of Chicago's last 24 games. Segares also helped the "Men in Red" earn an MLS club-record fourth Lamar Hunt U.S. Open Cup title in 2006, playing every minute in the tournament's Final. He held down the left side of defense in Chicago's starting XI in 2008 and 2009, while balancing his burgeoning duties for both club and country.

After the 2009 season, Segares left the Fire for Greek Cypriot club Apollon Limassol on a free transfer. In August 2010 Segares returned to the Fire. On December 6, 2012, Chicago Fire re-signed Segares to a multi-year deal. At the end of the 2014 season, the club declined his contract option.

On February 4, 2015, Segares announced his retirement.

=== International ===
Earning his first call up in 2007, Segares participated in 2010 FIFA World Cup qualifying and the 2009 CONCACAF Gold Cup, where Costa Rica made it to the semifinals.

== Coaching career ==
After his retirement, Segares remained on staff with Chicago Fire as an academy coach and a club ambassador. In January 2020, he joined the United States Soccer Federation becoming United States U15 head coach. On October 18, 2021, Segares was announced as the United States U17 new head coach.

== Coaching statistics ==
As of matches played on June 3, 2024.

Coaching record by team and tenure
Team	From	To	Record				
Team	From	To	P	W	D	L	Win %
United States U-17 MNT	Oct 2021	Present	19	10	2	7	52.6
Total			19	10	2	7	52.6

== Personal ==
Segares holds a U.S. green card which qualified him as a domestic player for MLS roster purposes.

== Honours ==
=== Chicago Fire ===
- Lamar Hunt U.S. Open Cup
  - Winners (1): 2006

=== Individual ===
- Chicago Fire Defender of the Year:
  - Winner: (1): 2007
