= Daniel Paladini =

American soccer player (born 1984)

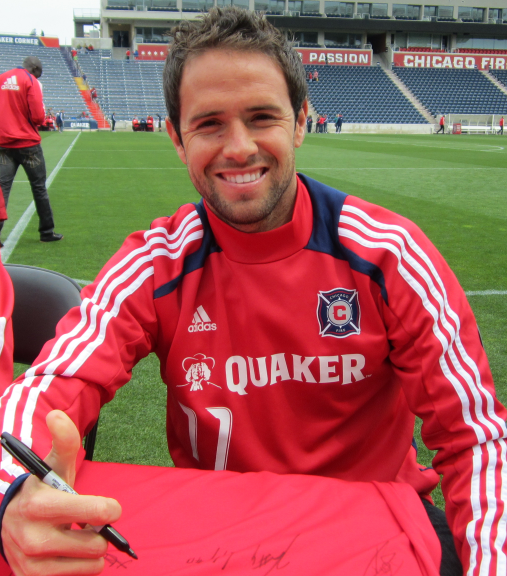

Personal information
- Date of birth: November 11, 1984 (age 41)
- Place of birth: Northridge, California, U.S.
- Height: 5 ft 9 in (1.75 m)
- Position: Midfielder

Youth career
- 2002–2005: Cal State Northridge Matadors

Senior career*
| Years | Team | Apps | (Gls) |
| 2006 | Los Angeles Galaxy | 0 | (0) |
| 2007 | San Fernando Valley Quakes | 14 | (3) |
| 2008 | Chivas USA | 8 | (1) |
| 2009–2010 | Carolina RailHawks | 59 | (10) |
| 2011–2013 | Chicago Fire | 58 | (4) |
| 2014 | Columbus Crew | 4 | (0) |
- * Club domestic league appearances and goals as of December 10, 2014

Daniel Paladini (born November 11, 1984) is an American former soccer player.

== Career ==
=== Youth and college ===
Paladini was twice named an all-state selection at St. Francis High School in 2000 and 2001, and played club soccer for Real SoCal for many years. At Cal State Northridge, he was a first team All-Big West Conference selection in 2004 and 2005, and scored seven goals and added four assists in 2005 en route to Big West midfielder of the year honors.

=== Professional ===
Paladini was signed to Los Angeles Galaxy's developmental roster in May 2006, having been the club's last selection of the second round (24th overall) of the 2006 MLS Supplemental Draft. He played for both Galaxy and C.D. Chivas USA's reserves during the 2006 season, and was a named substitute on several occasions for Galaxy, but never appeared for either first team, and was waived by the Galaxy at the end of the season.

Paladini played for the San Fernando Valley Quakes in the USL Premier Development League in 2007, scoring 3 goals in 14 appearances and helping the team reach the PDL playoffs, before being picked up by Chivas USA on March 26, 2008, and signed to the developmental roster for the 2008 season. He made his MLS debut on May 11, 2008, coming on as a 68th-minute substitute for Jesse Marsch in a 2–1 defeat to New England Revolution.

On February 9, 2009, Paladini joined Carolina RailHawks for the 2009 season. He went on to play a major part in Carolina's 2009 and 2010 campaigns, featuring in 57 games and scoring 10 goals while being named to the League's Best XI both years, as well as being named the club's MVP in 2009 and Offensive Player of the Year in 2010.

Paladini returned to Major League Soccer in 2011 when he signed with Chicago Fire on January 10, 2011. In his three years at the club Paladini featured in 58 league matches and scored 4 goals. On December 12, 2013, Paladini's rights were traded to Columbus Crew in exchange for a 4th round 2014 MLS SuperDraft pick.

On September 18, 2014, it was announced Paladini underwent a surgery for tibia and fibula fracture (as a result of a challenge during training session) and expected to be sidelined for at least four months.

== Personal life ==
Paladini was suspended from all MLS-related soccer activities on October 29, 2014, following allegations of a domestic dispute in which the police were called to his house.

Court reports released in January 2015 claim Paladini allegedly punched and kicked his fiancée Sarah Alexander. The complaint also alleged that Paladini pushed Alexander down, dragged her by the hair, and poured bleach over her head, and that Alexander was left with burns, bruises and a black eye as a result.

Paladini pleaded guilty to a misdemeanor count of domestic violence and was placed on probation for two years (suspended for six months) and fined $150 by Franklin County Municipal Court.

== Honors ==
=== Individual ===
- USSF D-2 Pro League Best XI (1): 2010
