= Hunter Jumper =

American soccer player

Personal information
- Date of birth: February 28, 1989 (age 37)
- Place of birth: Plano, Texas, United States
- Height: 6 ft 2 in (1.88 m)
- Position: Defender

Youth career
- –2008: Solar SC

College career
Years	Team	Apps	(Gls)
2008–2011	Virginia Cavaliers	79	(5)

Senior career*
Years	Team	Apps	(Gls)
2012–2014	Chicago Fire	7	(1)
2021–2022	Georgia Storm FC	6	(0)

International career^{‡}
2007	United States U18	1	(0)
- * Club domestic league appearances and goals as of January 4, 2021 ‡ National team caps and goals as of April 2, 2012

Hunter Jumper (born February 28, 1989) is an American soccer player who last played as a defender for National Premier Soccer League club Georgia Storm.

== College career ==
Jumper played his collegiate career at Virginia. During his four years with the Cavaliers, he was named to the Atlantic Coast Conference All-Tournament team three times.

== Professional career ==
=== Chicago Fire ===
Jumper was selected with the 28th pick of the 2012 MLS SuperDraft by Chicago Fire. After taking part in preseason, he officially signed for the club on March 6. Jumper made his club and professional debut on March 17, coming on as a 68th-minute substitution in a 1–1 draw against Montreal Impact. His lone professional goal came on August 23, 2013, helping the fire defeat Sporting Kansas City by a 1–0 scoreline.

At the beginning of the 2014 season, Jumper was diagnosed with arrhythmogenic right ventricular dysplasia. After undergoing treatment at the Cedars-Sinai Medical Center and Johns Hopkins Hospital, he was denied medical clearance to play sports and was forced to retire as a professional player. The Fire officially declined his contract option on November 18, ending his time with the club after eight appearances and one goal in all competitions.

=== Retirement and comeback ===
Following his retirement, Jumper returned to the University of Virginia to complete his bachelor's degree, "went into finance, got a master's degree, and started writing for a sports analytics company." He stayed active in soccer, spending the 2014 collegiate season as a graduate assistant coach at Virginia and criticizing the coaches, owner, and club culture of the Fire on Twitter. In 2020, Jumper received medical clearance to begin playing soccer again. He made his return to the sport on January 4, 2021, signing for National Premier Soccer League expansion club Georgia Storm after going through the club's tryout process. He became the first senior-level signing in club history.

== International career ==
Jumper made one appearance for the United States under-18 national team.
