= Leo Percovich =

Uruguayan footballer (born 1968)

Personal information
- Full name: Galileo Galilei Percovich Lopes
- Date of birth: 20 April 1968 (age 58)
- Place of birth: Montevideo, Uruguay
- Height: 1.90 m (6 ft 3 in)
- Position: Goalkeeper

Team information
- Current team: Middlesbrough (head of player pathway & development)

Senior career*
Years	Team	Apps	(Gls)
1987–1993	Nacional		
1994	Atlético Mineiro		
1995	Guarani		
1995	Bangu		
1995–1999	Fluminense		
2000	Alianza Lima		
2001	Racing de Ferrol		

International career
	Uruguay	6	(0)

Managerial career
- 2022: Middlesbrough (interim)
- * Club domestic league appearances and goals

Galileo Galilei Percovich Lopes (born 20 April 1968), is an Uruguayan former professional footballer, who is currently Head of Player Pathway and Development at Championship club Middlesbrough. He was granted British citizenship in June 2024.

== Playing career ==
Percovich played for Nacional, notably winning the Copa Libertadores and Uruguayan First Division. He went on to play for Atlético Mineiro, Guaraní, Fluminense and Alianza Lima. He appeared six times for the Uruguay national team.

== Coaching career ==
Percovich has had previous coaching stints and training with Stuttgart, Pachuca, Cruzeiro, Valencia and Real Madrid, alongside spells serving with the national teams of Brazil, France and Uruguay.

He joined the Colorado Rapids coaching staff in 2006, as their new goalkeeper coach, serving for two seasons before joining Chivas USA prior to the commence of the 2008 season. He moved to Toronto in December 2009, as an assistant coach following the departure of Preki during the off-season. In January 2011, Percovich continued coaching in the United States, joining Chicago Fire as assistant coach. In November 2013, it was announced he would not be returning for the 2014 season.

In November 2013, Percovich was appointed as a member of Aitor Karanka's coaching staff at Championship club Middlesbrough, being appointed as their new goalkeeping coach. He was part of the club staff that secured promotion to the Premier League at the end of the 2015–16 season. Percovich continued on as goalkeeping coach for the entirety of the 2016–17 season, despite Karanka's dismissal in March. Following the appointment of Garry Monk in June 2017, Percovich vacated his position, being replaced by Darryl Flahavan.

After a brief spell coaching at Fluminense, Percovich returned to Middlesbrough in June 2019, after being appointed as a first team assistant coach to new manager and former associate Jonathan Woodgate.

After Chris Wilder was sacked by Middlesbrough on 3 October 2022, Percovich was named caretaker manager. Middlesbrough won his first game in charge, a 1-0 home victory, over Birmingham City. On 24 October 2022, following the appointment of Michael Carrick, Percovich assumed the role of Head of Player Pathway and Development.

== Personal life ==
Percovich was born in Montevideo to a family of Croatian descent and was named after the Italian astronomer Galileo Galilei. In December 2017, Percovich and his family were seriously injured after the vehicle he was driving in plummeted off a bridge. He personally suffered from "slight injuries", his youngest daughter Antonella was killed, whereas his other two children, son Pietro and daughter Valentina, were seriously injured and left in critical condition. His wife Juliana suffered from a fractured pelvis. His older daughter Valentina died a week later.

== Managerial statistics ==
As of match played 22 October 2022

Managerial record by team and tenure
Team	From	To	Record				
Team	From	To	G	W	D	L	Win %
Middlesbrough (interim)	3 October 2022	24 October 2022	5	2	1	2	40.00

== Honours ==
Nacional

- Primera División Uruguaya: 1992

Middlesbrough

- Championship promotion: 2015–16
