= Sherjill Mac-Donald =

Dutch footballer (born 1984)

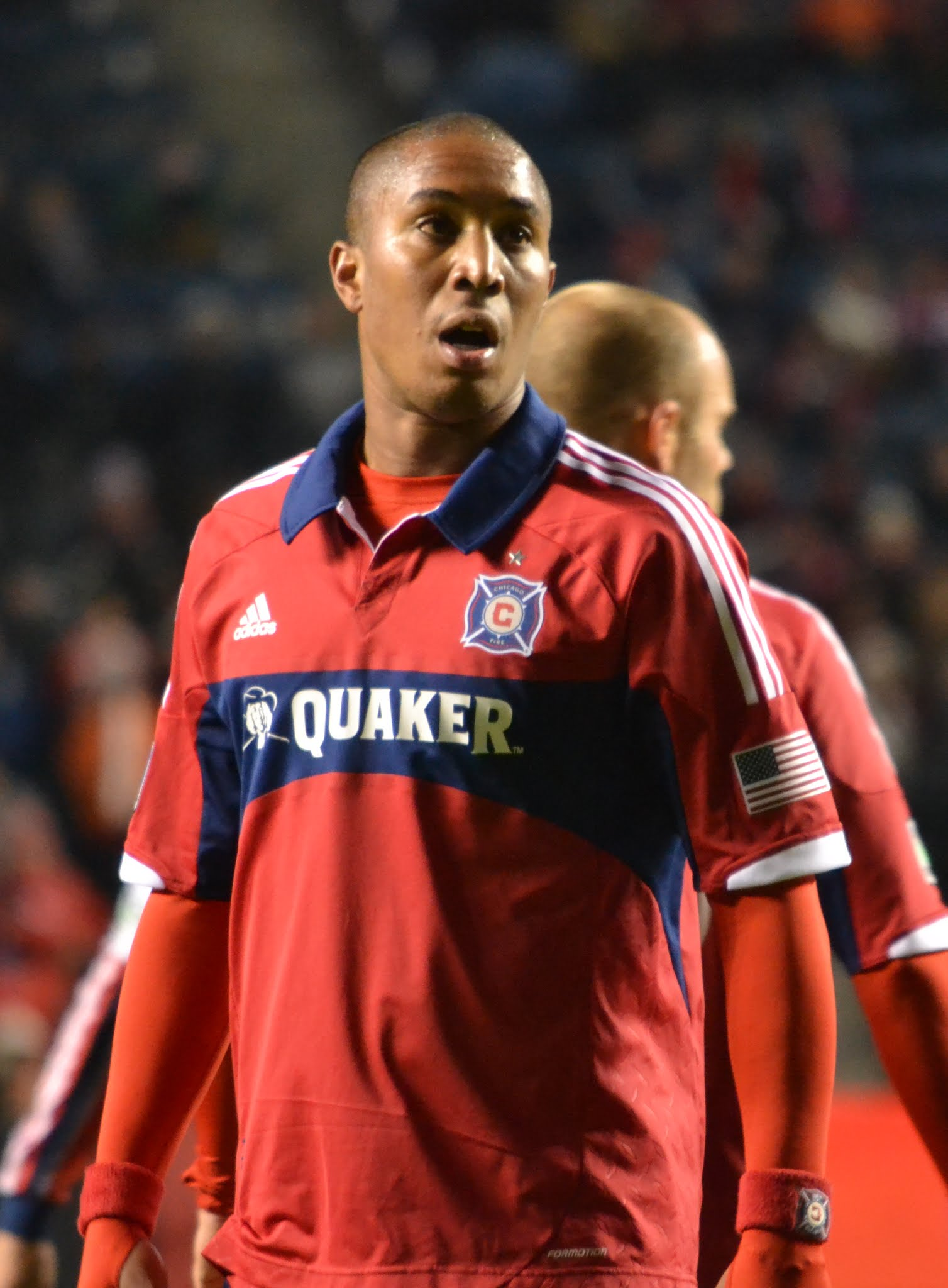
- Mac-Donald with Chicago Fire in 2013

Personal information
- Full name: Sherjill Jermaine Mac-Donald
- Date of birth: 20 November 1984 (age 42)
- Place of birth: Amsterdam, Netherlands
- Height: 1.84 m (6 ft 0 in)
- Position: Forward

Team information
- Current team: FC Ekeren

Youth career
- AVV De Volewijckers
- 2000–2001: Ajax

Senior career*
Years	Team	Apps	(Gls)
2002–2006	Anderlecht	26	(1)
2004–2005	→ Heracles Almelo (loan)	17	(4)
2005–2006	→ Hamburger SV II (loan)	22	(4)
2006–2008	AGOVV	24	(11)
2007–2008	→ West Bromwich Albion (loan)	18	(0)
2008–2009	West Bromwich Albion	5	(0)
2008	→ Hereford United (loan)	7	(6)
2009	→ Roeselare (loan)	16	(6)
2009–2012	Germinal Beerschot	82	(15)
2012–2013	Chicago Fire	27	(4)
2013–2016	Westerlo	41	(15)
2015–2016	→ Sparta Rotterdam (loan)	17	(2)
2016–2018	Almere City	55	(13)
2018	Busan IPark	2	(0)
2019–2020	KFC Lille		
2020–2021	ASV Geel		
2021–2025	KV Hooikt		
2025–	FC Ekeren		

International career
2006–2007	Netherlands U21	2	(0)
- * Club domestic league appearances and goals as of 1 February 2026

Sherjill Jermaine Mac-Donald (born 20 November 1984) is a Dutch professional footballer who plays as a forward for FC Ekeren.

== Club career ==
Mac-Donald started his career as a product of the Ajax youth system, and was loaned out to several clubs before being transferred to Anderlecht and then to AGOVV Apeldoorn.

He joined West Bromwich Albion on loan during the January 2007 transfer window, with the option of a permanent transfer at the end of his loan spell. He made his club debut as a substitute in a 2–1 victory over Plymouth Argyle on 31 January. On 27 February 2007, he missed a penalty during sudden death in the 6th round of the FA cup against Middlesbrough, who won 5–4 on penalties. After the end of the 2006–07 season it was announced that his loan period had been extended until January 2008. He has been described by West Bromwich Albion manager Tony Mowbray as "a special talent". On 4 January 2008, he signed a two-and-a-half-year permanent contract with Albion, after they paid a £200,000 fee.

On 8 February 2008, Mac-Donald joined Hereford United on a month's emergency loan. He scored twice on his debut the following day in a 4–1 victory over Dagenham & Redbridge, earning him a place in the League Two Team of the Week. Three days later he scored a hat-trick against Rochdale in a 4–2 away win. Mac-Donald returned to the Hawthorns having scored six goals in seven league games.

He joined Roeselare on loan during the January 2009 transfer window.

During the 2009 close season he left West Bromwich Albion to sign a contract with Germinal Beerschot which will keep him at the club until 30 June 2013.

Mac-Donald joined Major League Soccer club Chicago Fire on 24 July 2012 under the league's designated player rule. His debut for the Chicago Fire was unsuccessful, as the Fire drew last second to the San Jose Earthquakes. He was released on 14 August 2013.

In July 2018, Mac-Donald joined Busan IPark in South Korea, but after an unsuccessful half-year, he left the club again and returned to Belgium. He then started to train with KFC Lille. Mac-Donald signed with the club and scored one goal and made one assist in his first game.

In July 2020, Mac-Donald joined ASV Geel. He played for KV Hooikt in the 2021–22 season, competing in the Second Provincial League. He finished the season with 35 appearances, in which he scored 26 goals. In the 2023–24 season he helped the club to promotion to the First Provincial League.

== International career ==
Mac-Donald was capped for the Netherlands at U21 level, making his debut against an England U21 side who won 1–0 in November 2006. It was during this game that he came to the attention of West Bromwich Albion, as he played against Albion centre-back Curtis Davies.

== Personal life ==
Mac-Donald is of Surinamese descent.

== Honours ==
Sparta Rotterdam

- Eerste Divisie: 2015–16
