= Patrick Nyarko =

Ghanaian footballer

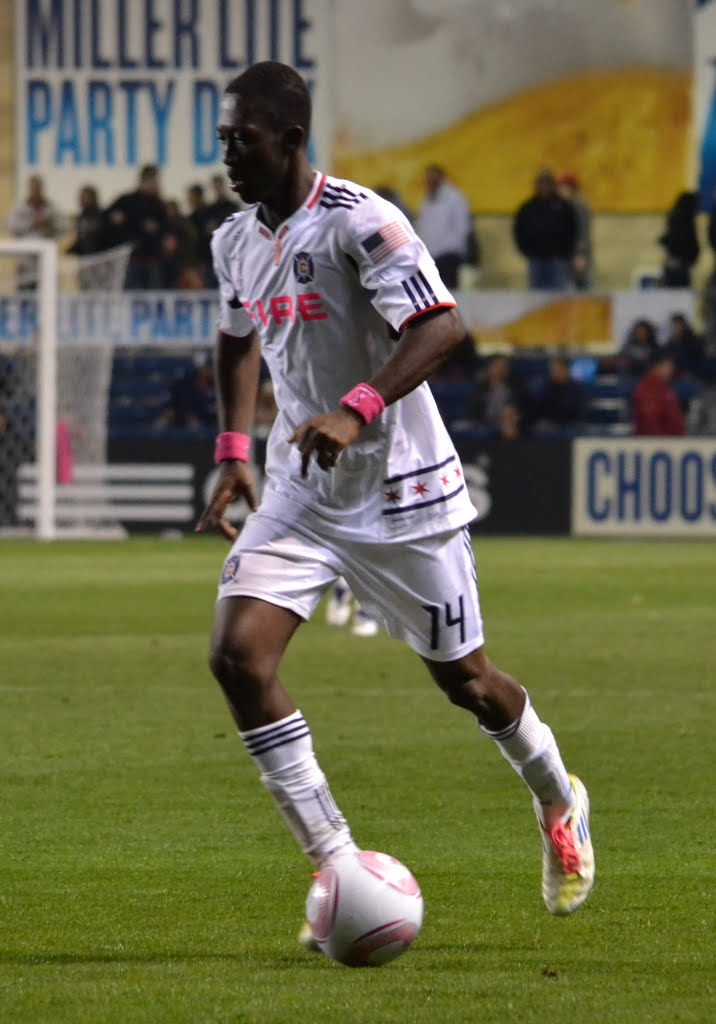

Personal information
- Full name: Patrick Nyarko
- Date of birth: January 15, 1986 (age 40)
- Place of birth: Kumasi, Ghana
- Height: 6 ft 0 in (1.83 m)
- Position: Winger

Team information
- Current team: Forward Madison (assistant coach)

Youth career
- 2005: Kaaseman

College career
Years	Team	Apps	(Gls)
2005–2007	Virginia Tech Hokies		

Senior career*
Years	Team	Apps	(Gls)
2008–2015	Chicago Fire	196	(19)
2016–2017	D.C. United	40	(5)
Total		236	(24)

International career^{‡}
2012	Ghana	1	(0)

Managerial career
- 2021–2022: Chicago Fire Academy (assistant coach)
- 2022–2024: Chicago Fire II (assistant coach)
- 2025: Forward Madison (U19 head coach)
- 2026–: Forward Madison (assistant coach)
- * Club domestic league appearances and goals as of October 28, 2017 ‡ National team caps and goals as of October 24, 2017

Patrick Nyarko (born January 15, 1986) is a Ghanaian football coach and former professional football player. Nyarko is currently an assistant coach for USL League One club Forward Madison.

== Playing career ==
=== College ===
After coming to the United States in 2005, Nyarko was a star forward and three-time All-ACC selection for the Virginia Tech Hokies soccer team, which played in the 2007 Division I Men's College Cup, falling to Wake Forest in the National Semifinals.

Nyarko, who finished his Virginia Tech career with 31 goals, was called by coach Oliver Weiss, "the most incredible player I've ever coached" and he is considered to be the best soccer player in Virginia Tech history. Nyarko first met Weiss when the coach was on a recruiting trip to Ghana.

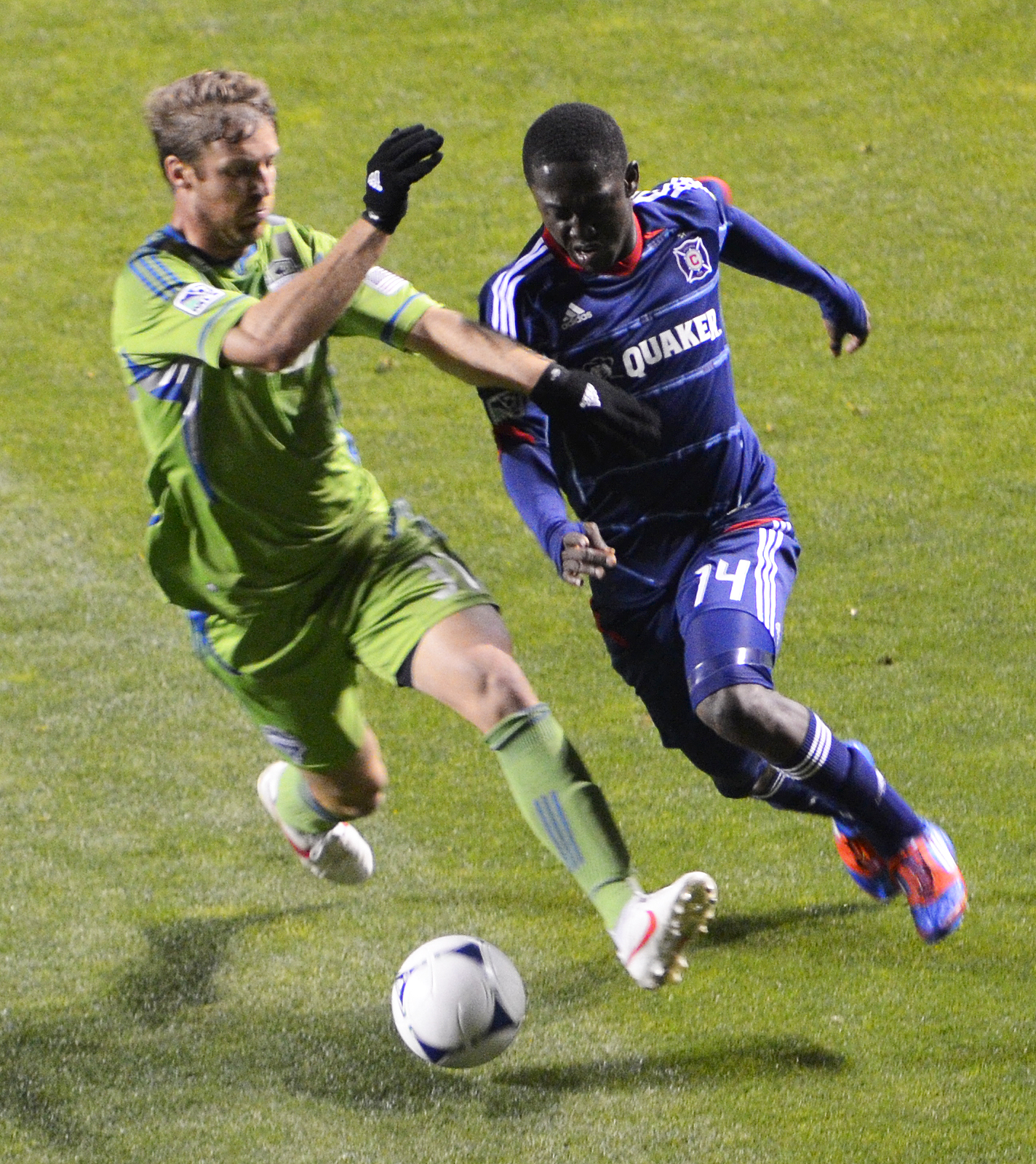
Jeff Parke of the Seattle Sounders is defending against attacking midfielder Patrick Nyarko of the Chicago Fire (Saturday, April 28, 2012)

In Nyarko's freshman year, he scored the lone goal of his team's marquee win over then-#4 North Carolina. Tech rose as high as #10 in the polls and earned its second trip in school history to the NCAA tournament. Nyarko was named the Atlantic Coast Conference freshman of the year and was named to the all-ACC team.

Following the 2007 season, in which the Hokies finished #8 in the final AP poll and played in the National Semifinals of the 2007 Division I Men's College Cup, Nyarko was named as a finalist for the Hermann Trophy. His accomplishments for the Hokies led to his enshrinement into the Virginia Tech Sports Hall of Fame in 2018.

=== Professional ===
Nyarko decided to forgo his senior season and enter the 2008 MLS SuperDraft. Widely predicted to be the first pick in the draft, Nyarko was selected 7th overall by the Chicago Fire.

He made his MLS debut on June 15, 2008, against FC Dallas, and scored his first MLS goal on August 2, 2008, against Chivas USA.

After eight seasons with Chicago, Nyarko was traded to D.C. United on January 6, 2016, in exchange for a second round 2016 MLS SuperDraft pick. Nyarko scored his first goal for United on April 2, 2016, scoring against the San Jose Earthquakes. He missed the last 3 months of the season with concussion. He was out of contract with United following the 2017 season and was considering retirement due to brain trauma due to 8 separate concussions he has suffered from.

=== International career ===
Nyarko was called up to the Ghana squad to face Chile. Nyarko made his Ghana debut against Chile on February 29, 2012, at the PPL Park in Chester, Pennsylvania.

== Coaching career ==
Nyarko joined the Chicago Fire Academy as an assistant coach in June 2021, and moved to the same role with Chicago Fire II before their inaugural 2022 season. Nyarko left the club for personal reasons following the 2024 season.

Nyarko joined Forward Madison as the head coach of their MLS Next U19 team in May 2025. Nyarko was named as an assistant coach for Forward Madison's senior team prior to their 2026 season.

== Personal ==
Nyarko was granted a U.S. green card in 2011. This status qualifies him as a domestic player for MLS roster purposes. Nyarko became a United States citizen in 2015.
