= 2008 Chicago Fire season =

Chicago Fire S.C.
2008 season
- Chairman: Andrew Hauptman
- Manager: Denis Hamlett
- MLS: 3rd overall (2nd in Eastern Conference)
- MLS Cup Playoffs: Conference Final
- U.S. Open Cup: Quarterfinals
- Brimstone Cup: Runners-up
- Top goalscorer: League: Chris Rolfe (9); All: Chris Rolfe (10)
- Average home league attendance: 17,052
Home colors	Away colors

The 2008 Chicago Fire season was the club's 10th year of existence, as well as their 11th season in Major League Soccer and 11th consecutive year in the top-flight of American soccer. It began with a 3-1 away win over Real Salt Lake on March 29, 2008 and ended with a 2-1 loss to Columbus Crew in the Eastern Conference Final on November 13, 2008. Denis Hamlett made his debut as the Chicago Fire coach after being promoted.

== Roster ==
=== Squad ===
- Players in bold have had senior international caps for their respective national squads.

Note: Flags indicate national team as defined under FIFA eligibility rules; some limited exceptions apply. Players may hold more than one non-FIFA nationality.

No.	Pos.	Nation	Player
0	GK	USA	Tyler Kettering
1	GK	USA	**Jon Busch**
2	DF	USA	**C.J. Brown** (Vice-captain)
3	FW	USA	Calen Carr
4	MF	MLI	**Bakary Soumare**
5	MF	USA	Brian Plotkin
6	DF	USA	Brandon Prideaux
7	MF	USA	**Logan Pause**
8	MF	USA	**Diego Gutiérrez**
9	FW	POL	**Tomasz Frankowski**
10	MF	MEX	**Cuauhtémoc Blanco** (Captain)
11	MF	USA	**John Thorrington**
12	FW	GHA	Patrick Nyarko
16	MF	GUA	**Marco Pappa**
17	FW	USA	**Chris Rolfe**

No.	Pos.	Nation	Player
18	MF	USA	Mike Banner
20	FW	USA	**Brian McBride**
21	MF	USA	**Justin Mapp**
22	DF	COL	Wilman Conde
23	MF	PAR	Líder Mármol
24	DF	USA	Daniel Woolard
25	DF	CRC	**Gonzalo Segares**
26	FW	CRC	**Andy Herron**
28	GK	USA	Nick Noble
29	MF	USA	Peter Lowry
32	DF	USA	Dasan Robinson
33	MF	USA	Stephen King
34	DF	USA	Austin Washington
36	MF	USA	Kai Kasiguran
70	MF	FRA	Saad Karim Hadji

=== Transfers ===
==== In ====
- (Ghana) Patrick Nyarko Drafted 7th overall in 2008 MLS Superdraft
- (United States) Dominic Cervi Drafted 12th overall in 2008 MLS Superdraft
- (United States) Peter Lowry Drafted 26th overall in 2008 MLS Superdraft
- (United States) Dwight Barnett Drafted 38th overall in 2008 MLS Superdraft
- (United States) Stephen King Drafted 40th overall in 2008 MLS Superdraft
- (United States) Austin Washington Drafted 54th overall in 2008 MLS Superdraft
- (Costa Rica) Andy Herron Rights acquired from Columbus Crew for 4th round pick in the 2010 Superdraft
- (Poland) Tomasz Frankowski Signed from (England) Wolverhampton Wanderers
- (United States) Brandon Prideaux Acquired in waiver draft from Colorado Rapids
- (Paraguay) Líder Mármol Signed as free agent.
- (United States) Brian McBride Free agent
- (France) Saad Karim Hadji Free agent

==== Out ====
- (United States) Matt Pickens To (England) Queens Park Rangers
- (Honduras) Iván Guerrero Lost to San Jose Earthquakes in the Expansion Draft
- (United States) Jim Curtin Traded to Chivas USA
- (United States) Chris Armas Retired
- (Costa Rica) Paulo Wanchope Retired
- (United States) Jeff Curtin Waived, later signed with D.C. United
- (Trinidad and Tobago) Osei Telesford Waived, later signed with Puerto Rico Islanders
- (United States) Chad Barrett Traded to Toronto FC in Brian McBride deal
- (United States) Brian Plotkin Waived, later signed with Columbus Crew

== Statistics ==
=== Appearances and goals ===
Last updated on June 5, 2008.

No.	Pos	Nat	Player	Total		MLS Season	
No.	Pos	Nat	Player	Apps	Goals	Apps	Goals
0	GK	(United States) USA	Tyler Kettering	0	0	0	0
1	GK	(United States) USA	Jon Busch	30	0	30	0
2	DF	(United States) USA	C.J. Brown	3	0	3	0
3	FW	(United States) USA	Calen Carr	9	2	9	2
4	MF	(Mali) MLI	Bakary Soumare	28	0	28	0
6	DF	(United States) USA	Brandon Prideaux	27	0	27	0
7	MF	(United States) USA	Logan Pause	27	0	27	0
8	MF	(United States) USA	Diego Gutiérrez	20	0	20	0
9	FW	(Poland) POL	Tomasz Frankowski	17	2	17	2
10	MF	(Mexico) MEX	Cuauhtémoc Blanco	27	7	27	7
11	MF	(United States) USA	John Thorrington	23	5	23	5
12	FW	(Ghana) GHA	Patrick Nyarko	9	1	9	1
16	MF	(Guatemala) GUA	Marco Pappa	6	0	6	0
17	FW	(United States) USA	Chris Rolfe	26	10	26	10
18	MF	(United States) USA	Mike Banner	11	0	11	0
20	FW	(United States) USA	Brian McBride	11	5	11	5
21	MF	(United States) USA	Justin Mapp	30	2	30	2
22	DF	(Colombia) COL	Wilman Conde	22	1	22	1
23	DF	(Paraguay) PAR	Lider Marmol	2	0	2	0
24	DF	(United States) USA	Daniel Woolard	8	1	8	1
25	DF	(Costa Rica) CRC	Gonzalo Segares	23	2	23	2
26	FW	(Costa Rica) CRC	Andy Herron	17	0	17	0
28	GK	(United States) USA	Nick Noble	0	0	0	0
29	MF	(United States) USA	Peter Lowry	0	0	0	0
32	DF	(United States) USA	Dasan Robinson	2	0	2	0
33	MF	(United States) USA	Stephen King	20	2	20	2
34	DF	(United States) USA	Austin Washington	1	0	1	0
36	MF	(United States) USA	Kai Kasiguran	0	0	0	0

== Competitions ==
=== Overall ===
Competition	Started round	Current position / round	Final position / round	First match	Last match
MLS	—	—		March 29, 2008	

Updated to match played July 21, 2009
Source: Competitions

== Standings ==
Pos	Team	Pld	W	L	T	GF	GA	GD	Pts	Qualification
1	Columbus Crew	30	17	7	6	50	36	+14	57	MLS Cup Playoffs
2	Chicago Fire	30	13	10	7	44	33	+11	46	MLS Cup Playoffs
3	New England Revolution	30	12	11	7	40	43	−3	43	MLS Cup Playoffs
4	Kansas City Wizards	30	11	10	9	37	39	−2	42	MLS Cup Playoffs
5	New York Red Bulls	30	10	11	9	42	48	−6	39	MLS Cup Playoffs
6	D.C. United	30	11	15	4	43	51	−8	37	
7	Toronto FC	30	9	13	8	34	43	−9	35	

Source: MLS

Pos	Team	Pld	W	L	T	GF	GA	GD	Pts	Qualification
1	Columbus Crew (C, S)	30	17	7	6	50	36	+14	57	CONCACAF Champions League
2	Houston Dynamo	30	13	5	12	45	32	+13	51	CONCACAF Champions League
3	Chicago Fire	30	13	10	7	44	33	+11	46	North American SuperLiga
4	Chivas USA	30	12	11	7	40	41	−1	43	North American SuperLiga
5	New England Revolution	30	12	11	7	40	43	−3	43	North American SuperLiga
6	Kansas City Wizards	30	11	10	9	37	39	−2	42	North American SuperLiga
7	Real Salt Lake	30	10	10	10	40	39	+1	40	
8	New York Red Bulls	30	10	11	9	42	48	−6	39	CONCACAF Champions League
9	Colorado Rapids	30	11	14	5	44	45	−1	38	
10	D.C. United	30	11	15	4	43	51	−8	37	CONCACAF Champions League
11	FC Dallas	30	8	10	12	45	41	+4	36	
12	Toronto FC	30	9	13	8	34	43	−9	35	CONCACAF Champions League (Note: As winners of the 2009 Canadian Championship)
13	LA Galaxy	30	8	13	9	55	62	−7	33	
14	San Jose Earthquakes	30	8	13	9	32	38	−6	33	

Source: MLS
Rules for classification: 1) points; 2) head-to-head record; 3) goal difference; 4) number of goals scored
(C) Champions; (S) Supporters' Shield

=== Results summary ===
Overall								Home						Away					
Pld	Pts	W	L	T	GF	GA	GD	W	L	T	GF	GA	GD	W	L	T	GF	GA	GD
30	46	13	10	7	44	33	+11	7	5	3	23	17	+6	6	5	4	21	16	+5

Last updated: July 21, 2009
Source: Major League Soccer
Pld = Matches played; Pts = Points; W = Matches won; T = Matches tied; L = Matches lost; GF = Goals for; GA = Goals against; GD = Goal difference

Round	1	2	3	4	5	6	7	8	9	10	11	12	13	14	15	16	17	18	19	20	21	22	23	24	25	26	27	28	29	30
Stadium	A	H	A	H	H	A	A	H	A	H	A	A	H	A	H	H	A	H	A	H	A	A	H	A	H	H	A	H	A	H
Result	T	W	W	L	W	W	W	L	W	L	L	L	T	T	W	T	T	W	W	L	W	L	W	L	L	W	T	T	L	W

Source: Chicago Fire
A = Away; H = Home; W = Win; L = Loss; T = Tie

== Matches ==
Win Tie Loss

=== MLS regular season ===
March 29, 2008	Real Salt Lake	1–1	Chicago Fire	Salt Lake City, Utah, United States
	Joy (yellow card) 51'; Soumare 71' (o.g.); Findley (yellow card) 80'; Beckerman (yellow card) 87'	Report	Pause (yellow card) 89'; Blanco 92+'	Stadium: Rice-Eccles Stadium; Attendance: 20,272; Referee: Terry Vaughn

April 3, 2008	Chicago Fire	4–0	New England Revolution	Bridgeview, Illinois, United States
	Barrett 4'; Mapp (yellow card) 17'; Frankowski 22'; Blanco 37' (pen.); Frankowski 39'; Barrett (yellow card) 50'; Gutierrez (yellow card) 89'	Report	Larentowicz (red card) 7'; Joseph (yellow card) 7'; Mansally (yellow card) 23'	Stadium: Toyota Park; Attendance: 15,553; Referee: Baldomero Toledo

April 12, 2008	San Jose Earthquakes	0–1	Chicago Fire	Oakland, California, United States
	Cochrane (yellow card) 65'; Riley (yellow card) 94+'	Report	Barrett 19'; Soumare (yellow card) 55'	Stadium: McAfee Coliseum; Attendance: 20,038; Referee: Kevin Stott

April 20, 2008	Chicago Fire	0–1	Kansas City Wizards	Bridgeview, Illinois, United States
	Prideaux (yellow card) 46'	Report	Jewsbury 4'; Harrington (yellow card) 57'; Trujillo (yellow card) 76'	Stadium: Toyota Park; Attendance: 17,121; Referee: Jair Marrufo

April 26, 2008	Chicago Fire	2–1	Colorado Rapids	Bridgeview, Illinois, United States
	Segares (yellow card) 45'; Thorrington 53'; Thorrington 84'; Gutierrez (yellow card) 88'	Report	Gomez (yellow card) 45'; Gomez (yellow card) 64'; Gray (yellow card) 66'; McManus 86'	Stadium: Toyota Park; Attendance: 14,251; Referee: Tim Weyland

May 3, 2008	New England Revolution	0–3	Chicago Fire	Foxborough, Massachusetts, United States
		Report	Rolfe 29'; Thorrington 50'; King 76'	Stadium: Gillette Stadium; Attendance: 10,858; Referee: Jair Marrufo

May 8, 2008	D.C. United	0–2	Chicago Fire	Washington, D.C., United States
	Burch (yellow card) 30'; Dyachenko (yellow card) 40'; Namoff (yellow card) 73'	Report	Mapp 38'; Blanco 62'; Prideaux (yellow card) 77'; Thorrington (yellow card) 92'	Stadium: RFK Stadium; Attendance: 18,605; Referee: Terry Vaughn

May 17, 2008	Chicago Fire	1–2	Houston Dynamo	Bridgeview, Illinois, United States
	Carr 28'; Segares (yellow card) 92'; Blanco (yellow card) 95'	Report	De Rosario 17'; Clark (yellow card) 48'; De Rosario (yellow card) 58'; Boswell 82'	Stadium: Toyota Park; Attendance: 17,183; Referee: Paul Ward

May 25, 2008	New York Red Bulls	1–5	Chicago Fire	East Rutherford, New Jersey, United States
	Angel (yellow card) 68'; Altidore 74'	Report	Barrett 8'; Rolfe 48'; Blanco 55'; Barrett 60'; Segares 62'; Soumare (yellow card) 68'	Stadium: Giants Stadium; Attendance: 14,754; Referee: Ricardo Salazar

June 7, 2008	Chicago Fire	v	D.C. United	Bridgeview, Illinois
				Stadium: Toyota Park

June 15, 2008	F.C. Dallas	v	Chicago Fire	Fort Worth, Texas
				Stadium: Toyota Stadium

June 19, 2008	Chivas USA	v	Chicago Fire	Carson, California
				Stadium: Home Depot Center

June 28, 2008	Chicago Fire	v	San Jose Earthquakes	Bridgeview, Illinois
				Stadium: Toyota Park

July 5, 2008	Columbus Crew	v	Chicago Fire	Columbus, Ohio
				Stadium: MAPFRE Stadium

July 12, 2008	Chicago Fire	v	Toronto FC	Bridgeview, Illinois
				Stadium: Toyota Park

July 19, 2008	Chicago Fire	v	Real Salt Lake	Bridgeview, Illinois
				Stadium: Toyota Park

July 27, 2008	Kansas City Wizards	v	Chicago Fire	Kansas City, Kansas
				Stadium: CommunityAmerica Ballpark

August 2, 2008	Chivas USA	v	Chicago Fire	Carson, California
				Stadium: Home Depot Center

August 9, 2008	New England Revolution	v	Chicago Fire	Foxborough, Massachusetts
				Stadium: Gillette Stadium

August 16, 2008	Chicago Fire	v	D.C. United	Bridgeview, Illinois
				Stadium: Toyota Park

August 21, 2008	Los Angeles Galaxy	v	Chicago Fire	Carson, California
				Stadium: StubHub Center

August 31, 2008	Houston Dynamo FC	v	Chicago Fire	Houston, Texas
				Stadium: Robertson Stadium

September 6, 2008	Chicago Fire	v	New York Red Bulls	Bridgeview, Illinois
				Stadium: Toyota Park

September 14, 2008	Colorado Rapids	v	Chicago Fire	Commerce City, Colorado
				Stadium: Dick's Sporting Goods Park

September 21, 2008	Chicago Fire	v	FC Dallas	Bridgeview, Illinois
				Stadium: Toyota Park

September 25, 2008	Chicago Fire	v	Los Angeles Galaxy	Bridgeview, Illinois
				Stadium: Toyota Park

October 5, 2008	Kansas City Wizards	v	Chicago Fire	Kansas City, Kansas
				Stadium: CommunityAmerica Ballpark

October 12, 2008	Chicago Fire	2–2	Columbus Crew	Bridgeview, Illinois, United States
	McBride 13', 79'	Report, Report	Gaven 59'; Busch (yellow card) 45'; Schelotto 61'; Carroll (yellow card) 86'	Stadium: Toyota Park; Attendance: 14,994; Referee: Shane Moody

October 18, 2008	Toronto FC	v	Chicago Fire	Exhibition Place
				Stadium: BMO Field

October 23, 2008	Chicago Fire	v	New York Red Bulls	Bridgeview, Illinois
				Stadium: Toyota Park

=== MLS Cup Playoffs ===
October 30, 2008 Conference Semifinals	New England Revolution	0–0	Chicago Fire	Foxborough, Massachusetts
6:30 p.m. CDT				Stadium: Gillette Stadium; Attendance: 5,221; Referee: Alex Prus

November 6, 2008 Conference Semifinals	Chicago Fire	3–0	New England Revolution	Bridgeview, Illinois
7:30 p.m. CDT	Rolfe 45+2'; Conde 47'; Segarez 74'			Stadium: Toyota Park; Attendance: 17,312; Referee: Jair Marrufo

November 13, 2008 Conference Finals	Columbus Crew	2–1	Chicago Fire	Columbus, Ohio
6:30 p.m. CDT	Marshall 49'; Gaven 55'		McBride 29'	Stadium: Columbus Crew Stadium; Attendance: 14,688; Referee: Terry Vaughn

=== U.S. Open Cup ===
June 10, 2008 MLS Qualifier	Chicago Fire	3–2 (AET)	Columbus Crew	Peoria, Illinois, United States
19:00 CDT	King 10'; Herron 65'; Prideaux (yellow card) 82'; Herron 116'	Report	Ekpo 63'; Garey 67'; Zayner (yellow card) 79'; Rogers (yellow card) 100'	Stadium: Shea Stadium; Attendance: 3,829; Referee: Tony Russo

July 1, 2008 Third round	Chicago Fire	4–1	Cleveland City Stars (USL-2)	Bridgeview, Illinois, United States
19:30 CDT	Banner 13'; Carr 23'; Barrett 26'; Marmol (yellow card) 57'; Banner 73'	Report	McClung 61'; Stewart (yellow card) 78'	Stadium: Toyota Park; Referee: Hidajet Tica

July 8, 2008 Quarterfinals	D.C. United	2–1 (AET)	Chicago Fire	Germantown, Maryland, United States
19:30 EDT	Doe (yellow card) 52'; Doe 77'; Moreno (yellow card) 89'; Namoff 99'; Fred (yellow card) 107'; Burch (red card) 108'	Report	Woolard 36'; Soumare (yellow card) 48'; Pause (yellow card) 78'; Thorrington (yellow card) 81'; Blanco (red card) 108'	Stadium: Maryland SoccerPlex; Attendance: 4,118; Referee: Shane Moody

=== Friendlies ===
May 21, 2008	Chicago Fire (United States)	0–0	(Poland) Wisła Kraków	Bridgeview, Illinois, United States
19:30 CDT	Robinson (yellow card) 20'; Conde (yellow card) 75'; Brown (yellow card) 78'; Woolard (yellow card) 81'	Report	Cléber (yellow card) 51'; Cantoro (yellow card) 54'; Díaz (yellow card) 55'	Stadium: Toyota Park; Attendance: 14,040; Referee: Mark Kadlecik

July 30, 2008	Chicago Fire (United States)	2–0	(England) Everton F.C.	Bridgeview, Illinois, United States
19:30 CDT	Rolfe 42'; Frankowski 70'	Report	Baxter (yellow card) 45'; Gosling (yellow card) 81'; Vaughan (red card) 92+'	Stadium: Toyota Park; Attendance: 9,125; Referee: Landis Wiley

August 24, 2008	Veracruz (Mexico)	3–1	(United States) Chicago Fire	Veracruz, Veracruz, Mexico
	Leyva 41'; Olivera (yellow card) 44'; Seccafien 55'; Marmol 71' (o.g.)	Report	Blanco 16'; Robinson (yellow card) 18'	Stadium: Estadio Luis de la Fuente
