= 2009 Real Salt Lake season =

American soccer team season

Real Salt Lake
2009 season
- Owner: SCP Worldwide
- Coach: Jason Kreis
- Stadium: Rio Tinto Stadium
- Major League Soccer: 8th
- MLS Cup: Champions
- 2009 U.S. Open Cup: N/A
- Rocky Mountain Cup: Winners
- Highest home attendance: 19,546 (vs Colorado Rapids, 6 June)
- Lowest home attendance: 11,499 (vs Columbus Crew, 31 October)
- Average home league attendance: 16,070
- Biggest win: RSL 6-0 NE (4/25)
- Biggest defeat: 'DAL 3-0 RSL (9/26)
Home colors	Away colors

The 2009 Real Salt Lake season was the fifth season of the team's existence. After clinching the eighth and final spot in the 2009 MLS Cup Playoffs, Real Salt Lake would go on to defeat the Los Angeles Galaxy in the 2009 MLS Cup. The team was the first team in MLS history to win the MLS Cup after finishing the regular season with a losing record (11–12–7).

== Squad ==
=== First-team squad ===
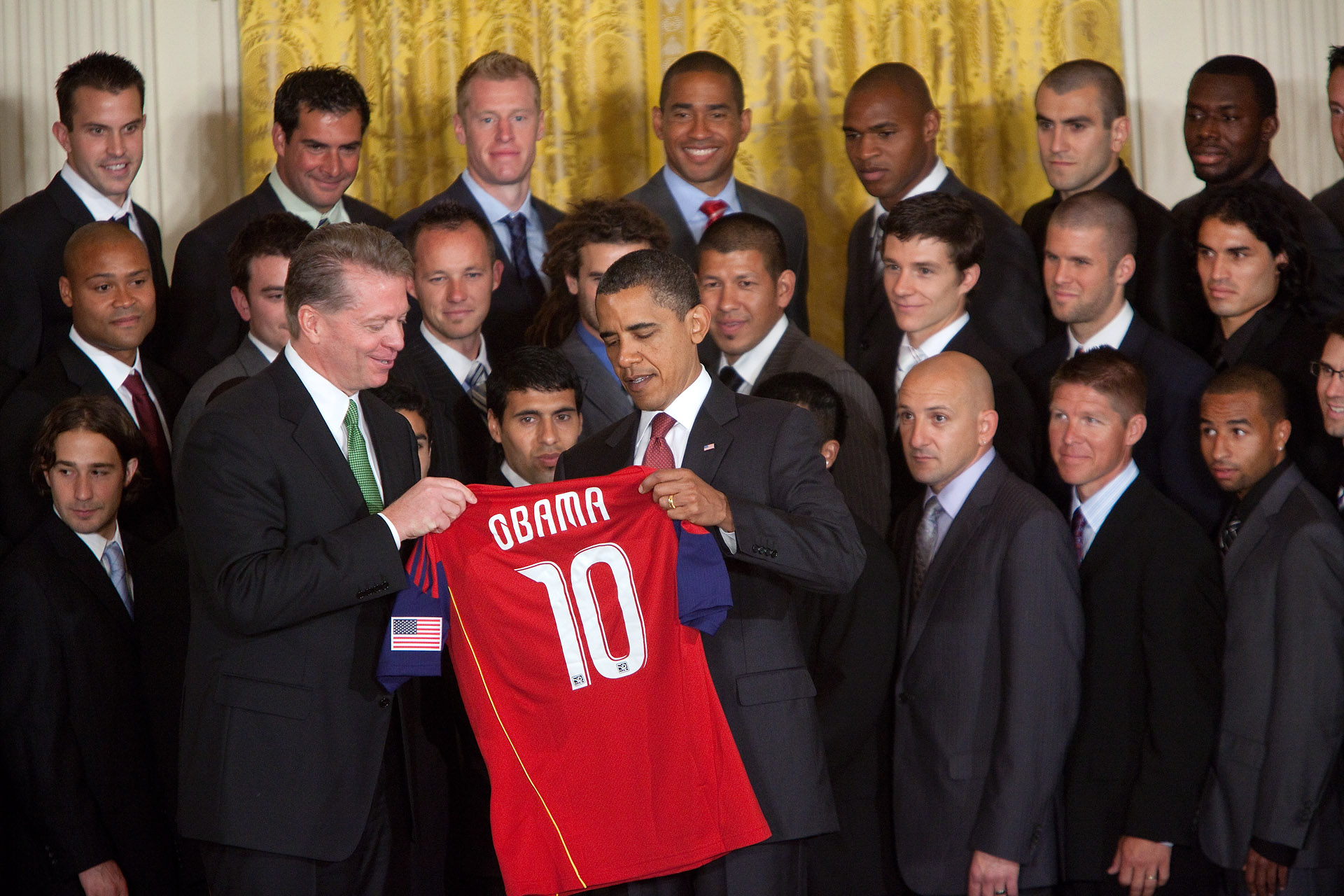
Real Salt Lake with President Barack Obama at the White House in June 2010

As of July 15, 2009. Note: Flags indicate national team as defined under FIFA eligibility rules; some limited exceptions apply. Players may hold more than one non-FIFA nationality.

No.	Pos.	Nation	Player
1	GK	USA	Chris Seitz
2	DF	USA	Tony Beltran
3	DF	GHA	Robbie Russell
4	DF	COL	Jámison Olave
5	MF	USA	Kyle Beckerman
6	DF	USA	Nat Borchers
7	MF	USA	Alex Nimo (on loan at Portland)
8	FW	CAN	Will Johnson
10	FW	USA	Robbie Findley
11	MF	ARG	Javier Morales
12	MF	HAI	Jean Alexandre (on loan at Austin)
14	FW	ARM	Yura Movsisyan
16	FW	ARG	Fabián Espíndola

No.	Pos.	Nation	Player
17	DF	USA	Chris Wingert
18	GK	USA	Nick Rimando
19	FW	BRA	Pablo Campos
20	MF	USA	Ned Grabavoy
21	MF	NED	Rachid El Khalifi
22	MF	ARG	Nelson González (on loan from Quilmes)
23	MF	USA	Raphael Cox
24	GK	USA	Kyle Reynish
25	FW	USA	Tino Nuñez
33	DF	USA	David Horst (on loan at Austin)
77	MF	JAM	Andy Williams
84	MF	USA	Clint Mathis

=== Out on loan ===
Note: Flags indicate national team as defined under FIFA eligibility rules; some limited exceptions apply. Players may hold more than one non-FIFA nationality.

No.	Pos.	Nation	Player
7	MF	USA	Alex Nimo (with the Portland Timbers until the end of the USL season)

== Club ==
=== Management ===
Position	Staff
Head Coach	(United States) Jason Kreis
Assistant Coach	(United States) Jeff Cassar
Assistant Coach	(United States) Brian Johnson
Assistant Coach	(United States) Robin Fraser
Head Athletic trainer	(United States) Jake Joachim
Assistant Athletic trainer	(United States) Tyson Pace

Last updated: April 18, 2009
Source: Real Salt Lake

=== Other information ===
Owner	(United States) SCP Worldwide
Ground (capacity and dimensions)	Rio Tinto Stadium (20,008 / N/A)

Source: Real Salt Lake

== Competitions ==
=== Overall ===
Competition	Started round	Final position / round	First match	Last match
MLS	—		March 21, 2009	November 22, 2009

Updated to match played June 30, 2014
Source: Competitions

=== Major League Soccer ===
==== Standings ====
Pos	Team	Pld	W	L	T	GF	GA	GD	Pts	Qualification
1	LA Galaxy	30	12	6	12	36	31	+5	48	MLS Cup Playoffs
2	Houston Dynamo	30	13	8	9	39	29	+10	48	MLS Cup Playoffs
3	Seattle Sounders FC	30	12	7	11	38	29	+9	47	MLS Cup Playoffs
4	Chivas USA	30	13	11	6	34	31	+3	45	MLS Cup Playoffs
5	Real Salt Lake	30	11	12	7	43	35	+8	40	MLS Cup Playoffs
6	Colorado Rapids	30	10	10	10	42	38	+4	40	
7	FC Dallas	30	11	13	6	50	47	+3	39	
8	San Jose Earthquakes	30	7	14	9	36	50	−14	30	

Source: MLS

Pos	Team	Pld	W	L	T	GF	GA	GD	Pts	Qualification
1	Columbus Crew (S)	30	13	7	10	41	31	+10	49	CONCACAF Champions League
2	LA Galaxy	30	12	6	12	36	31	+5	48	CONCACAF Champions League
3	Houston Dynamo	30	13	8	9	39	29	+10	48	North American SuperLiga
4	Seattle Sounders FC	30	12	7	11	38	29	+9	47	CONCACAF Champions League
5	Chicago Fire	30	11	7	12	39	34	+5	45	North American SuperLiga
6	Chivas USA	30	13	11	6	34	31	+3	45	North American SuperLiga
7	New England Revolution	30	11	10	9	33	37	−4	42	North American SuperLiga
8	Real Salt Lake (C)	30	11	12	7	43	35	+8	40	CONCACAF Champions League
9	Colorado Rapids	30	10	10	10	42	38	+4	40	
10	D.C. United	30	9	8	13	43	44	−1	40	
11	FC Dallas	30	11	13	6	50	47	+3	39	
12	Toronto FC	30	10	11	9	37	46	−9	39	CONCACAF Champions League
13	Kansas City Wizards	30	8	13	9	33	42	−9	33	
14	San Jose Earthquakes	30	7	14	9	36	50	−14	30	
15	New York Red Bulls	30	5	19	6	27	47	−20	21	

Source: MLS
Rules for classification: 1) points; 2) head-to-head record; 3) goal difference; 4) number of goals scored
(C) Champions; (S) Supporters' Shield

==== Results summary ====
Overall								Home						Away					
Pld	Pts	W	L	T	GF	GA	GD	W	L	T	GF	GA	GD	W	L	T	GF	GA	GD
29	40	11	11	7	43	34	+9	9	1	5	34	11	+23	2	10	2	9	23	−14

Last updated: October 25, 2009
Source: Major League Soccer
Pld = Matches played; Pts = Points; W = Matches won; T = Matches tied; L = Matches lost; GF = Goals for; GA = Goals against; GD = Goal difference

Round	1	2	3	4	5	6	7	8	9	10	11	12	13	14	15	16	17	18	19	20	21	22	23	24	25	26	27	28	29	30
Stadium	A	H	H	A	H	A	H	A	H	A	A	H	A	A	H	H	A	H	A	H	H	A	H	A	H	A	A	H	A	H
Result	L	W	W	L	W	L	T	L	L	T	L	T	W	T	W	T	L	W	L	W	T	L	W	W	T	L	L	W	L	W

Updated to match(es) played on October 25, 2009. Source: Real Salt Lake
A = Away; H = Home; W = Win; L = Loss; T = Tie

== Matches ==
Win Tie Loss

=== March ===
March 28, 2009	Seattle Sounders FC	2–0	Real Salt Lake	Seattle, Washington
	Jaqua 17'; Alonso (yellow card) 21'; Montero 77'	Report	Beckerman (yellow card) 10'; Morales (yellow card) 22'; Olave (yellow card) 45'	Stadium: Qwest Field; Attendance: 28,548; Referee: Baldomero Toledo

=== April ===
April 2, 2009	Real Salt Lake	4–1	Columbus Crew	Sandy, Utah
	Findley 2'; Findley 29'; Borchers (yellow card) 40'; Beckerman (yellow card) 45'; Findley 62'; Beckerman 67'	Report	Garey 22'; Ekpo (yellow card) 48+'; Rogers (yellow card) 58'	Stadium: Rio Tinto Stadium; Attendance: 11,806; Referee: Alex Prus

April 11, 2009	Real Salt Lake	2–1	D.C. United	Sandy, Utah
	Morales (yellow card) 15'; Wingert (yellow card) 25'; Borchers (yellow card) 35'; Olave 40'; Morales 80'	Report	Emilio 38'; Gomez (yellow card) 39'; Burch (yellow card) 75'; McTavish (yellow card) 91+'	Stadium: Rio Tinto Stadium; Attendance: 11,793; Referee: Kevin Stott

April 18, 2009	New York Red Bulls	2–0	Real Salt Lake	East Rutherford, New Jersey
	Kandji 2'; Angel 57'; Hall (red card) 66'; Richards (yellow card) 69'	Report	Morales (yellow card) 42'; Russell (yellow card) 49'	Stadium: Giants Stadium; Attendance: 8,508; Referee: Ricardo Salazar

April 25, 2009	Real Salt Lake	6–0	New England Revolution	Sandy, Utah
	Morales (yellow card) 43'; Olave 53'; Mathis 55'; Movsisyan 70'; Escalada 81'; Williams 85'; Findley 89'	Report	Thompson (yellow card) 22'; Heaps (yellow card) 45'; Mansally (yellow card) 57'	Stadium: Rio Tinto Stadium; Attendance: 14,051

=== May ===
May 2, 2009	Colorado Rapids	2–0	Real Salt Lake	Commerce City, Colorado
	LaBrocca 11'; Ihemelu (yellow card) 37'; Kimura 60'	Report	Olave (red card) 41'; Findley (yellow card) 54'; Beckerman (yellow card) 86'	Stadium: Dick's Sporting Goods Park; Attendance: 9,045; Referee: Edvin Jurisevic

May 6, 2009	Real Salt Lake	2–2	Los Angeles Galaxy	Sandy, Utah
	Mathis (yellow card) 7'; Findley 34'; Johnson 92+'	Report	Donovan 91+'; Magee 94+'	Stadium: Rio Tinto Stadium; Attendance: 16,155; Referee: Michael Kennedy

May 9, 2009	Chivas USA	1–0	Real Salt Lake	Carson, California
	Kljestan (yellow card) 25'; Lillingston (yellow card) 45'; Nagamura 54'; Galindo (yellow card) 66'	Report	Olave (yellow card) 32'; Beckerman (yellow card) 58'	Stadium: The Home Depot Center; Attendance: 13,421; Referee: Hilario Grajeda

May 16, 2009	Real Salt Lake	0–2	Kansas City Wizards	Sandy, Utah
	Johnson (yellow card) 73'; Russell (yellow card) 89'	Report	Wolff 20'; Espinoza (yellow card) 22'; Besler (yellow card) 24'; Arnaud (yellow card) 40'; Wolff 67'	Stadium: Rio Tinto Stadium; Attendance: 19,340; Referee: Yader Reyes

May 23, 2009	D.C. United	0–0	Real Salt Lake	Washington, D.C.
		Report	Russell (yellow card) 37'	Stadium: RFK Memorial Stadium; Attendance: 16,089; Referee: Jorge Gonzalez

May 30, 2009	San Jose Earthquakes	2–1	Real Salt Lake	Santa Clara, California
	Glen 52'; Johnson (yellow card) 57'; Alvarez 63'; Alvarez (yellow card) 63'; Corrales (yellow card) 69'	Report	Beckerman (yellow card) 28'; Johnson (yellow card) 48'; Morales (yellow card) 70'; Findley 80'	Stadium: Buck Shaw Stadium; Attendance: 10,153; Referee: Kevin Stott

=== June ===
June 6, 2009	Real Salt Lake	1–1	Colorado Rapids	Sandy, Utah
	Espindola (yellow card) 22'; Russell (yellow card) 73' (yellow-red card) 82'; Movsisyan 79'; Mathis (yellow card) 87'	Report	Ballouchy (yellow card) 3'; LaBrocca (yellow card) 45'; Ihemelu (yellow card) 76'; Cummings 88'	Stadium: Rio Tinto Stadium; Attendance: 19,546; Referee: Jeff Gontarek

June 13, 2009	Los Angeles Galaxy	0–2	Real Salt Lake	Carson, California
	Gordon (yellow card) 46'; Kirovski (yellow card) 65'; Lewis (red card) 65'; Gonzalez (yellow card) 91+'	Report	Movsisyan 13'; Borchers 51'; Johnson (yellow card) 59'; Mathis (yellow card) 59'	Stadium: The Home Depot Center; Attendance: 19,718; Referee: Jasen Anno

June 20, 2009	Houston Dynamo	1–1	Real Salt Lake	Houston, Texas, United States
	Mulrooney (yellow card) 44'; Ching 89'	Report	Beltran (yellow card) 17'; Espindola 28'; Olave (yellow card) 35' (yellow-red card) 58'; Morales (yellow card) 67'; Rimando (yellow card) 72'	Stadium: Robertson Stadium; Attendance: 17,151; Referee: Jair Marrufo

June 27, 2009	Real Salt Lake	3–0	Toronto FC	Sandy, Utah, United States
	Movsisyan 21'; Beckerman 44'; Mathis 78'	Report	Barrett (yellow card) 46+'; Brennan (yellow card) 51'; Vitti (yellow card) 61'; Serioux (yellow card) 65'	Stadium: Rio Tinto Stadium; Attendance: 18,188; Referee: Edvin Jurisevic

=== July ===
July 4, 2009	Real Salt Lake	1–1	San Jose Earthquakes	Sandy, Utah
	Williams (yellow card) 43'; Espindola (red card) 77'; Leitch 91+' (o.g.)	Report	Campos (yellow card) 13'; Salinas (yellow card) 47'; Alvarez 63'; McDonald (yellow card) 75'; Hernandez (yellow card) 76'; Leitch (yellow card) 86'; Cannon (yellow card) 95+'	Stadium: Rio Tinto Stadium; Attendance: 17,478; Referee: Michael Kennedy

July 18, 2009	Columbus Crew	3–1	Real Salt Lake	Columbus, Ohio
	Lenhart 23'; Garey 31'; Garey 52'; O'Rourke (yellow card) 72'	Report	Grabavoy (yellow card) 34'; Beltran (yellow card) 46+'; Russell (yellow card) 65'; Cox (yellow card) 76'	Stadium: Columbus Crew Stadium; Attendance: 12,922; Referee: Hilario Grajeda

July 24, 2009	Real Salt Lake	4–2	FC Dallas	Sandy, Utah
	Espindola (yellow card) 29'; Borchers (yellow card) 35'; Movsisyan 55'; Findley 62' (pen.); Johnson (yellow card) 72'; Olave (yellow card) 77'; Torres 82' (o.g.); Movsisyan 91+'	Report	Cunningham 13' van den Bergh 21' van den Bergh (yellow card) 61'; Burse (yellow card) 62'; Ricchetti (yellow card) 78'; Moor (red card) 95+'	Stadium: Rio Tinto Stadium; Attendance: 18,822; Referee: Ricardo Salazar

=== August ===
August 1, 2009	Chicago Fire	1–0	Real Salt Lake	Bridgeview, Illinois
19:30 CDT	Segares (yellow card) 8'; Nyarko 76'	Report		Stadium: Toyota Park; Attendance: 14,534; Referee: Alex Prus

August 8, 2009	Real Salt Lake	1–0	Seattle Sounders FC	Sandy, Utah
19:00 MST	Mathis (yellow card) 11'; Findley 62'; Beckerman (yellow card) 65'	Report	Hurtado (yellow card) 76'	Stadium: Rio Tinto Stadium; Attendance: 14,193; Referee: Kevin Stott

August 15, 2009	Real Salt Lake	0–0	Houston Dynamo	Sandy, Utah
	Mathis (yellow card) 4' (yellow-red card) 47+'; Olave (yellow card) 30'; Beckerman (yellow card) 74'; Beltran (yellow card) 77'	Report	Hainault (yellow card) 8' (yellow-red card) 36'; Barrett (yellow card) 35'	Stadium: Rio Tinto Stadium; Attendance: 16,972; Referee: Paul Ward

August 23, 2009	New England Revolution	3–1	Real Salt Lake	Foxborough, Massachusetts
	Dube 9'; Dube 29'; Barnes (yellow card) 35'; Dube (yellow card) 47'; Dube 66'	Report	Espindola (yellow card) 35'; Johnson (yellow card) 65'; Barnes 85' (o.g.); Wingert (yellow card) 87'	Stadium: Gillette Stadium; Attendance: 10,552; Referee: Edvin Jurisevic

August 26, 2009	Real Salt Lake	4–0	Chivas USA	Sandy, Utah
	Beltran (yellow card) 32'; Campos 43'; Campos (yellow card) 46+'; Johnson (yellow card) 57'; Espindola 75'; Findley 85'; Findley 90'	Report	Saragosa (yellow card) 47'; Bornstein (yellow card) 51'	Stadium: Rio Tinto Stadium; Attendance: 14,747; Referee: Terry Vaughn

August 29, 2009	Kansas City Wizards	0–1	Real Salt Lake	Kansas City, Kansas
	Cristman (yellow card) 16'; Hirsig (yellow card) 87'	Report	Campos 18'; Grabavoy (red card) 42'; Beckerman (yellow card) 44'; Wingert (yellow card) 78'	Stadium: CommunityAmerica Ballpark; Attendance: 9,924; Referee: Mark Geiger

=== September ===
September 12, 2009	Real Salt Lake	1–1	Chicago Fire	Sandy, Utah
	Beltran (yellow card) 23'; Olave (yellow card) 27'; Olave 72'	Report	Lowry (yellow card) 32'; Rolfe 44'; Carr (yellow card) 79'	Stadium: Rio Tinto Stadium; Attendance: 17,615; Referee: Alex Prus

September 19, 2009	Houston Dynamo	3–2	Real Salt Lake	Houston, Texas, United States
	Ching 2'; Cameron 5'; Cochrane (yellow card) 46+'; Davis 81'; Ching (red card) 82'; Ashe (yellow card) 92+'	Report	Borchers (yellow card) 20'; Beckerman 27'; Olave (red card) 32'; Movsisyan 60'; Findley (yellow card) 61'; Johnson (yellow card) 70'	Stadium: Robertson Stadium; Attendance: 18,133; Referee: Baldomero Toledo

September 26, 2009	FC Dallas	3–0	Real Salt Lake	Frisco, Texas
	Movsisyan (yellow card) 79'; Williams (yellow card) 84'	Report	Cunningham 5'; Ferreira 10'; Cunningham 87'	Stadium: Pizza Hut Park; Referee: Kevin Stott

=== October ===
October 14, 2009	Real Salt Lake	2–0	New York Red Bulls	Sandy, Utah
	Beltran (yellow card) 3'; Johnson (yellow card) 59'; Williams 80'; Espindola 90'	Report	Borman (yellow card) 38'; Boyens (yellow card) 86'	Stadium: Rio Tinto Stadium; Attendance: 16,247; Referee: Baldomero Toledo

October 17, 2009	Toronto FC	1–0	Real Salt Lake	Toronto, Ontario, Canada
	Brennan (yellow card) 19'; Brennan 48'	Report	Beltran (yellow card) 39'; Beckerman (yellow card) 55'	Stadium: BMO Field; Attendance: 20,384; Referee: Terry Vaughn

October 24, 2009	Real Salt Lake	3–0	Colorado Rapids	Sandy, Utah
	Findley 15'; Williams (yellow card) 25'; Findley 33'; Borchers (yellow card) 35'; Beckerman (yellow card) 58'; Movsisyan 85'	Report	Baudet (yellow card) 18'; Casey (yellow card) 39'; Movsisyan (yellow card) 86'	Stadium: Rio Tinto Stadium; Attendance: 18,675; Referee: Jorge Gonzalez

=== MLS playoffs ===
October 31, 2009 Conf. Semifinals	Real Salt Lake	1–0	Columbus Crew	Sandy, Utah
16:30 MDT	Beckerman (yellow card) 38'; Findley 88'	Report	Carroll (yellow card) 19'	Stadium: Rio Tinto Stadium; Attendance: 11,499; Referee: Mark Geiger

November 5, 2009 Conf. Semifinals	Columbus Crew	2–3	Real Salt Lake	Columbus, Ohio
20:00 CST	Schelotto 19'; Schelotto 35'; O'Rourke (yellow card) 48'; Moreno (yellow card) 59'	[ Report]	Morales 37'; Findley 45+2' (pen.); Williams 74'; Olave (yellow card) 68'	Stadium: Columbus Crew Stadium; Attendance: 10,109; Referee: Baldomero Toledo

November 14, 2009 Conf. Finals	Chicago Fire	0–0 (a.e.t.) (4–5 p)	Real Salt Lake	Bridgeview, Illinois
19:00 CST	Thorrington (yellow card) 92+'; Prideaux (yellow card) 101'; Blanco (yellow card) 117'	Report	Morales (yellow card) 39'; Wingert (yellow card) 75'; Beckerman (yellow card) 99'; Johnson (yellow card) 110'	Stadium: Toyota Park; Attendance: 21,723; Referee: Ricardo Salazar
	Penalties
	Blanco (penalty scored); McBride (penalty scored); Conde (penalty scored); Thorrington (penalty missed); Brown (penalty scored); Pause (penalty missed); Prideaux (penalty missed)		Mathis (penalty scored); Morales (penalty missed); Findley (penalty scored); Beckerman (penalty scored); Johnson (penalty scored); Espindola (penalty missed); Grabavoy (penalty scored)

November 22, 2009 Final	Los Angeles Galaxy	1–1 (a.e.t.) (4–5 p)	Real Salt Lake	Seattle, Washington
5:30 p.m. PST	Birchall (yellow card) 39'; Magee 41'	Report	Johnson (yellow card) 14'; Findley 64'	Stadium: Qwest Field; Attendance: 46,011; Referee: Kevin Stott
	Penalties
	Beckham (penalty scored); Berhalter (penalty scored); Kirovski (penalty missed); Donovan (penalty missed); Magee (penalty scored); Klein (penalty scored); Buddle (penalty missed)		Mathis (penalty scored); Findley (penalty scored); Beckerman (penalty missed); Grabavoy (penalty scored); Williams (penalty missed); Wingert (penalty scored); Russell (penalty scored)

=== U.S. Open Cup qualifying ===
April 28, 2009 Qualification	Seattle Sounders FC	4–1	Real Salt Lake	Tukwila, Washington
	Ianni (yellow card) 20'; Le Toux 25' (pen.) 55'; Nyassi 27' (yellow card) 71'; King 53'	Report	Johnson 32'; Olave (yellow card) 41'	Stadium: Starfire Sports Complex; Attendance: 3,890
