= 2010 Chicago Fire season =

Chicago Fire
2010 season
- Owner: Andrew Hauptman
- Coach: Carlos de los Cobos
- MLS: 10th overall (4th in Eastern Conference)
- MLS Cup Playoffs: Did not qualify
- U.S. Open Cup: Round of 16
- SuperLiga: Group stage
- Sister Cities Cup: 4th
- Top goalscorer: Marco Pappa (7)
- Biggest win: CHV 1-4 CHI (10/23)
- Biggest defeat: TFC 4-1 CHI (5/8)
Home colors	Away colors

The 2010 Chicago Fire season was the club's 12th year of existence, their 13th season in Major League Soccer, and 13th consecutive year in the top-flight of American soccer.

== Squad ==
As of October 23, 2010 Note: Flags indicate national team as defined under FIFA eligibility rules; some limited exceptions apply. Players may hold more than one non-FIFA nationality.

No.	Pos.	Nation	Player
2	DF	USA	C. J. Brown
3	FW	USA	Calen Carr
4	DF	USA	Kwame Watson-Siriboe
6	MF	USA	Peter Lowry
8	MF	SWE	Freddie Ljungberg
9	MF	BIH	Baggio Husidić
10	FW	MEX	Nery Castillo (on loan from Shakhtar Donetsk)
11	MF	USA	John Thorrington
12	MF	USA	Logan Pause
13	DF	SLV	Deris Umanzor
14	FW	GHA	Patrick Nyarko
15	FW	NED	Collins John
16	MF	GUA	Marco Pappa

No.	Pos.	Nation	Player
18	MF	USA	Mike Banner
19	MF	USA	Corben Bone
20	FW	USA	Brian McBride (captain)
22	DF	COL	Wilman Conde
23	DF	POL	Krzysztof Król (on loan from Jagiellonia)
25	GK	USA	Sean Johnson
27	MF	USA	Victor Pineda
28	DF	USA	Steven Kinney
29	DF	USA	Erik Ustruck
31	DF	CRC	Gonzalo Segares
32	DF	USA	Dasan Robinson
40	GK	USA	Andrew Dykstra
77	MF	SRB	Bratislav Ristić
—	GK	USA	Ian Anderson
—	GK	USA	Alec Dufty (on loan from AC St. Louis)

=== Transfers ===
==== In ====
Note: Flags indicate national team as defined under FIFA eligibility rules; some limited exceptions apply. Players may hold more than one non-FIFA nationality.

No.	Pos.	Nation	Player
19	MF	USA	Corben Bone (from Draft, 13th Overall)
4	DF	USA	Kwame Watson-Siriboe (from Draft, 26th Overall)
28	DF	USA	Steven Kinney (from Draft, 45th Overall)
25	GK	USA	Sean Johnson (from Draft, 51st Overall)
15	FW	NED	Collins John (from K.S.V. Roeselare)
—	MF	SLV	Julio Martínez (On loan from Club León)
13	DF	SLV	Deris Umanzor (from C.D. Águila)

No.	Pos.	Nation	Player
8	MF	SWE	Freddie Ljungberg (from Seattle Sounders FC)
10	FW	MEX	Nery Castillo (On loan from Shakhtar Donetsk)
27	MF	USA	Victor Pineda (from Academy)
29	GK	USA	Erik Ustruck
77	MF	SRB	Bratislav Ristić (from Rad Beograd)
31	DF	CRC	Gonzalo Segares (from Apollon Limassol)
—	GK	USA	Ian Anderson
—	GK	USA	Alec Dufty (On loan from AC St. Louis)

==== Out ====
Note: Flags indicate national team as defined under FIFA eligibility rules; some limited exceptions apply. Players may hold more than one non-FIFA nationality.

No.	Pos.	Nation	Player
10	MF	MEX	Cuauhtémoc Blanco (Free Agent)
31	DF	CRC	Gonzalo Segares (To Apollon Limassol)
6	DF	USA	Brandon Prideaux (Retired)
17	FW	USA	Chris Rolfe (To AaB Fodbold)
24	DF	USA	Daniel Woolard (Released on waivers)
00	GK	USA	Ian Anderson (Released on waivers)
34	DF	USA	Austin Washington (Released on waivers)

No.	Pos.	Nation	Player
1	GK	USA	Jon Busch (Released on waivers)
21	MF	USA	Justin Mapp (Trade to Philadelphia Union)
5	DF	USA	Tim Ward (to the San Jose Earthquakes)
23	FW	BUL	Stefan Dimitrov (Released on waivers)
—	MF	SLV	Julio Martinez (To Club León)

=== Formation ===
Starting XI vs. Chivas USA on Oct. 23:

== Club ==
Chairman	(United States) Andrew Hauptman
Ground (capacity and dimensions)	Toyota Park (20,000 / N/A)

Source: Chicago Fire

=== Management ===
Position	Staff
Technical Director	(United States) Frank Klopas
Manager	(Mexico) Carlos de los Cobos
Assistant manager	(Mexico) Alvaro Briones

Last updated: November 23, 2010
Source: Chicago Fire

=== Kits ===
Home	Away	Away Special

Type	Shirt	Shorts	Socks	First appearance / Info
Home	Red / White lettering	Red	Red	
Away	White / Navy lettering	White	White	
Away Special	White / Green lettering	White	Green	MLS, April 24 against Houston

== Review ==
=== March ===
Chicago began their twelfth Major League Soccer regular season on the road the first two weeks with a match against the New York Red Bulls on March 27, 2010 and the Colorado Rapids on April 3, 2010 followed by their first home match against San Jose Earthquakes on April 10, 2010.

=== May ===
The Chicago Fire participated in the first ever Chicago Sister Cities International Cup. A friendly tournament hosted by the Fire.

=== July ===
Fire terminate loan agreement with Leon F.C. for the rights of Julio Martinez

=== August ===
The Fire trade for Freddie Ljungberg (from Seattle) and also sign Nery Castillo from Shakhtar Donetsk. The Fire trade away Justin Mapp and Tim Ward for allocation money and to clear roster spots.

== Competitions ==
- MLS – 10th Overall
- MLS Cup – Did not qualify
- U.S. Open Cup – 3rd round
- SuperLiga – Group Stage

== League table ==
Conference

Pos	Team	Pld	W	L	T	GF	GA	GD	Pts	Qualification
1	New York Red Bulls	30	15	9	6	38	29	+9	51	MLS Cup Playoffs
2	Columbus Crew	30	14	8	8	40	34	+6	50	MLS Cup Playoffs
3	Kansas City Wizards	30	11	13	6	36	35	+1	39	
4	Chicago Fire	30	9	12	9	37	38	−1	36	
5	Toronto FC	30	9	13	8	33	41	−8	35	
6	New England Revolution	30	9	16	5	32	50	−18	32	
7	Philadelphia Union	30	8	15	7	35	49	−14	31	
8	D.C. United	30	6	20	4	21	47	−26	22	

Source: MLS

Overall

Pos	Team	Pld	W	L	T	GF	GA	GD	Pts	Qualification
1	LA Galaxy (S)	30	18	7	5	44	26	+18	59	CONCACAF Champions League
2	Real Salt Lake	30	15	4	11	45	20	+25	56	
3	New York Red Bulls	30	15	9	6	38	29	+9	51	
4	FC Dallas	30	12	4	14	42	28	+14	50	CONCACAF Champions League
5	Columbus Crew	30	14	8	8	40	34	+6	50	
6	Seattle Sounders FC	30	14	10	6	39	35	+4	48	CONCACAF Champions League
7	Colorado Rapids (C)	30	12	8	10	44	32	+12	46	CONCACAF Champions League
8	San Jose Earthquakes	30	13	10	7	34	33	+1	46	
9	Kansas City Wizards	30	11	13	6	36	35	+1	39	
10	Chicago Fire	30	9	12	9	37	38	−1	36	
11	Toronto FC	30	9	13	8	33	41	−8	35	CONCACAF Champions League
12	Houston Dynamo	30	9	15	6	40	49	−9	33	
13	New England Revolution	30	9	16	5	32	50	−18	32	
14	Philadelphia Union	30	8	15	7	35	49	−14	31	
15	Chivas USA	30	8	18	4	31	45	−14	28	
16	D.C. United	30	6	20	4	21	47	−26	22	

Source: MLS
Rules for classification: 1) points; 2) head-to-head record; 3) goal difference; 4) number of goals scored
(C) Champions; (S) Supporters' Shield

=== Results summary ===
Overall								Home						Away					
Pld	Pts	W	L	T	GF	GA	GD	W	L	T	GF	GA	GD	W	L	T	GF	GA	GD
30	36	9	12	9	37	38	−1	4	4	7	15	13	+2	5	8	2	22	25	−3

Last updated: October 23, 2010
Source: MLS 2010 regular reason standings
Pld = Matches played; Pts = Points; W = Matches won; T = Matches tied; L = Matches lost; GF = Goals for; GA = Goals against; GD = Goal difference

Round	1	2	3	4	5	6	7	8	9	10	11	12	13	14	15	16	17	18	19	20	21	22	23	24	25	26	27	28	29	30
Stadium	A	A	H	A	H	H	A	A	H	H	H	A	A	H	A	H	H	A	A	H	H	A	A	H	A	A	H	H	H	A
Result	L	T	L	W	W	T	L	T	T	W	T	W	L	L	W	T	W	L	L	T	T	L	L	L	W	L	W	L	T	W
Position	10	13	15	11	7	7	12	11	11	9	10	9	9	9	9	9	7	9	10	10	10	11	11	11	11	12	11	10	10	10

Updated to match(es) played on October 23, 2010. Source: MLS Results and League table
A = Away; H = Home; W = Win; L = Loss; T = Tie

== Match results ==
Win Tie Loss

=== March ===
March 27, 2010	New York Red Bulls	1–0	Chicago Fire	Harrison, New Jersey
7:00 pm ET	Lindpere 29'	Report		Stadium: Red Bull Arena; Attendance: 24,572; Referee: Baldomero Toledo

=== April ===
April 3, 2010	Colorado Rapids	2–2	Chicago Fire	Commerce City, Colorado
4:00 pm ET	Cummings 12'; Wynne (yellow card) 22'; Clark (yellow card) 31'; Casey 41'; Earls (yellow card) 42'; Cummings (yellow card) 57'	Report	John 25'; Pappa (yellow card) 42'; McBride 50' (pen.)	Stadium: Dick's Sporting Goods Park; Attendance: 11,641; Referee: Terry Vaughn

April 10, 2010	Chicago Fire	1–2	San Jose Earthquakes	Bridgeview, Illinois
8:30 pm ET	Pappa 52'	Report	Luiz (yellow card) 28'; Alvarez 49'; Opara 81'	Stadium: Toyota Park; Attendance: 20,276; Referee: Mark Geiger

April 17, 2010	D.C. United	0–2	Chicago Fire	Washington, D.C.
8:30 pm ET	James (yellow card) 73'; Morsink (yellow card) 85'	Report	Pappa 80'; McBride 90'	Stadium: RFK Stadium; Attendance: 18,407; Referee: Ricardo Salazar

April 24, 2010	Chicago Fire	2–0	Houston Dynamo	Bridgeview, Illinois
8:30 pm ET	Husidic 48+'; Lowry (yellow card) 55' (goal) 67'; John (yellow card) 81'; Krol (red card) 84'; Banner (yellow card) 88'	(report)	Chabala (yellow card) 58'; Serioux (yellow card) 65'; Cruz (yellow card) 79' (yellow-red card) 82'; Landin (yellow card) 84'	Stadium: Toyota Park; Attendance: 11,312; Referee: Ricardo Salazar

=== May ===
May 1, 2010	Chicago Fire	1–1	C.D. Chivas USA	Bridgeview, Illinois
8:30 pm ET	Husidic 52'	Report	Dealgado (yellow card) 67'; Santos 76'	Stadium: Toyota Park; Attendance: 13,224; Referee: Jason Anno

May 8, 2010	Toronto FC	4–1	Chicago Fire	Toronto, Ontario, CAN
4:00 pm ET	LaBrocca 24'; De Guzman (yellow card) 39'; White 46'; Barrett 66'; Barrett 69'; Cann (yellow card) 72'	Report	Pause 50'	Stadium: BMO Field; Attendance: 20,060; Referee: Terry Vaughn

May 15, 2010	Kansas City Wizards	2–2	Chicago Fire	Kansas City, Kansas
8:30 pm ET	Jewsbury (yellow card) 33'; Espinoza (yellow card) 43'; Kamara 50'; Conrad (yellow card) 62'; Escobar (yellow card) 63'; Kamara 88'	Report	Martínez 13'; Martínez (yellow card) 43'; McBride 47'; Krol (yellow card) 63'	Stadium: CommunityAmerica Ballpark; Attendance: 8,155; Referee: Michael Kennedy

May 27, 2010	Chicago Fire	1–1	FC Dallas	Bridgeview, Illinois
8:00 pm ET	McBride 40'; Conde (yellow card) 62'	Report	Ferreira 6'	Stadium: Toyota Park; Attendance: 12,522; Referee: Baldomero Toledo

=== June ===
June 5, 2010	Chicago Fire	2–1	Philadelphia Union	Bridgeview, Illinois
7:30 CT	Husidic 14'; Brown (yellow card) 45'; McBride (yellow card) 70'; Pappa 74'	Report	Miglioranzi (yellow card) 22'; Mwanga 90+'	Stadium: Toyota Park; Attendance: 14,658; Referee: Abiodun Okulaja

June 9, 2010	Chicago Fire	2–2	Colorado Rapids	Bridgeview, Illinois
	Pappa 23' 46'	Report	Cummings 21'; Casey 91'	Stadium: Toyota Park; Attendance: 13,607; Referee: Paul Ward

June 27, 2010	New England Revolution	0–1	Chicago Fire	Foxborough, Massachusetts
7:00 pm EDT		(report)	Pappa 30'; Conde (yellow card) 47'	Stadium: Gillette Stadium; Attendance: 12,306; Referee: Jair Marrufo

=== July ===
July 3, 2010	Columbus Crew	2–1	Chicago Fire	Columbus, Ohio
	Moffat 43'; Garey 45'		Hejduk 44' (o.g.); Robinson (yellow card) 45'	Stadium: Crew Stadium; Attendance: 14,017; Referee: Alex Prus

July 8, 2010	Chicago Fire	0–1	Real Salt Lake	Bridgeview, Illinois
	Conde (yellow card) 50'		Findley 40'; Johnson (yellow card) 67'; Espíndola (yellow card) 88'	Stadium: Toyota Park; Attendance: 17,847; Referee: Terry Vaughn

=== August ===
August 1, 2010	Los Angeles Galaxy	2–3	Chicago Fire	Carson, California
	Bowen (yellow card) 23'; Donovan 37'; Kirovski (yellow card) 45'; Birchall (yellow card) 53'; Kovalenko (yellow card) 65'; Dunivant (yellow card) 68'; Donovan 81'		Pappa 4'; John 5'; Banner 19'; Nyarko (yellow card) 36'; Johnson (yellow card) 90'	Stadium: Home Depot Center; Attendance: 20,348; Referee: Silviu Petrescu

August 8, 2010	Chicago Fire	0–0	New York Red Bulls	Bridgeview, Illinois
	Husidić (yellow card) 30'		Ream (yellow card) 31'; Mendes (yellow card) 78'	Stadium: Toyota Park; Attendance: 21,868; Referee: Baldomero Toledo

August 18, 2010	Chicago Fire	2–1	New England Revolution	Bridgeview, Illinois
	Husidic 32'; Castillo (yellow card) 37'; Conde (yellow card) 39'; Carr 85'; Castillo (yellow card) 38'		Phelan (yellow card) 12'; Perovic 16'; Gibbs (yellow card) 25'; Perović (yellow card) 42'; Osei (yellow card) 52'; Barnes (yellow card) 90'	Stadium: Toyota Park; Attendance: 14,056; Referee: Michael Kennedy

August 21, 2010	Houston Dynamo	4–3	Chicago Fire	Houston, Texas
	Ching 31'; Ching (yellow card) 42'; Palmer 50'; Ching 59'; Ching 85'		Carr 55'; Pappa (yellow card) 60'; Boswell 69' (o.g.); Conde (yellow card) 70'; Brown 81'; Ljungberg (yellow card) 90'	Stadium: Robertson Stadium; Attendance: 18,890; Referee: Kevin Stott

August 28, 2010	Seattle Sounders FC	2–1	Chicago Fire	Seattle, Washington
	Montero (yellow card) 24'; Montero 36'; Nkufo (yellow card) 44'; Montero 90'; Jaqua (yellow card) 90'		Kinney (yellow card) 21'; Thorrington 28' (pen.); Ljungberg (yellow card) 83'	Stadium: Qwest Field; Attendance: 36,386; Referee: Ramón Hernández

=== September ===
September 4, 2010	Chicago Fire	1–1	Los Angeles Galaxy	Bridgeview, Illinois
	Segares (red card) 22'; Pause (yellow card) 63'; John (yellow card) 88' (goal) 88'	Report	Gonzalez (yellow card) 87' (goal) 89'	Stadium: Toyota Park; Attendance: 21,068; Referee: Mark Geiger

September 8, 2010	Chicago Fire	0–0	Toronto FC	Bridgeview, Illinois
7:30 pm CDT	Nyarko (yellow card) 68'	Report	Cann (yellow card) 24' de Guzman (yellow card) 35'; Usanov (yellow card) 69'	Stadium: Toyota Park; Attendance: 12,891; Referee: Ramon Hernandez

September 11, 2010	Philadelphia Union	1–0	Chicago Fire	Chester, Pennsylvania
6:00 pm EDT	Le Toux 36'; Jacobson (yellow card) 60'	Report	Ljungberg (yellow card) 36'; Conde (yellow card) 45+'	Stadium: PPL Park; Attendance: 18,563; Referee: Edvin Jurisevic

September 18, 2010	Real Salt Lake	1–0	Chicago Fire	Sandy, Utah
2:00 pm MDT	Beckerman (yellow card) 33'; Saborío 47+' (pen.)	Report	Conde (yellow card) 30' (yellow-red card) 46+'	Stadium: Rio Tinto Stadium; Attendance: 14,440; Referee: Jorge Gonzalez

September 25, 2010	Chicago Fire	0–1	Seattle Sounders FC	Bridgeview, Illinois
7:00 pm CDT	Thorrington (yellow card) 27'; Pappa (yellow card) 69'	Report	Nkufo 89'	Stadium: Toyota Park; Attendance: 17,477; Referee: Jason Anno

September 29, 2010	San Jose Earthquakes	0–3	Chicago Fire	Santa Clara, California
9:00 pm CDT	Geovanni (yellow card) 50'	Report	Kinney 36'; Krol (yellow card) 50'; Ljungberg 72'; Nyarko 92'	Stadium: Buck Shaw Stadium; Attendance: 9,829; Referee: Abiodun Okulaja

=== October ===
October 2, 2010	FC Dallas	3–0	Chicago Fire	Frisco, Texas
	Rodriguez 19'; Chavez (yellow card) 30'; Chavez 46'; Cunningham 67'	Report	Pause (yellow card) 28'; Conde (yellow card) 84'	Stadium: Pizza Hut Park; Attendance: 10,615; Referee: Yader Reyes

October 8, 2010	Chicago Fire	2–0	Columbus Crew	Bridgeview, Illinois
	Lowry 30'; Kinney (yellow card) 41'; McBride 53'; Brown (yellow card) 58'; Lowry (yellow card) 88'	Report	Moffat (yellow card) 25'; Brunner (yellow card) 37'	Stadium: Toyota Park; Attendance: 15,124; Referee: Edvin Jurisevic

October 12, 2010	Chicago Fire	0–2	Kansas City Wizards	Bridgeview, Illinois
		Report	Arnaud 46'; Arnaud (yellow card) 65'; Bunbury 80'; Zusi (yellow card) 91+'	Stadium: Toyota Park; Attendance: 12,230; Referee: Ricardo Salazar

October 16, 2010	Chicago Fire	0–0	D.C. United	Bridgeview, Illinois
7:00 pm CDT	Conde (yellow card) 37'	Report	Quaranta (yellow card) 5'	Stadium: Toyota Park; Attendance: 19,056; Referee: Abiodun Okulaja

October 23, 2010	Chivas USA	1–4	Chicago Fire	Carson, California
8:00 pm CDT	Flores (yellow card) 5'; Borja (yellow card) 44'; Maldonado 57'; Maldonado (yellow card) 59'; Zemanski (yellow card) 64'; Espinoza (yellow card) 71'; Ante Jazic (yellow card) 89'	Report	McBride 40'; Ljungberg 47'; Conde (yellow card) 47'; Carr 68'; Ljungberg (yellow card) 72'; Husidic 93+'	Stadium: Home Depot Center; Attendance: 14,825; Referee: Paul Ward

=== International Friendly ===
May 30, 2010	Chicago Fire	0–1	A.C. Milan	Bridgeview, Illinois
7:00 pm EDT			Seedorf 47'	Stadium: Toyota Park; Attendance: 20,000

=== U.S. Open Cup ===
June 29, 2010 Third round	Chicago Fire	0–0 (a.e.t.) (3–0 p)	Charleston Battery	Bridgeview, Illinois
7:00 pm EDT	Nyarko (yellow card) 48'; Conde (yellow card) 70'; Watson-Siriboe (yellow card) 73'; Pappa (yellow card) 88'	Report	Armstrong (yellow card) 16'; Zaher (yellow card) 90'	Stadium: Toyota Park; Attendance: 2,526
	Penalties
	Neagle (penalty scored); Zaher (penalty scored); Fuller (penalty scored)		(penalty missed) McBride; (penalty missed) Król; (penalty missed) Conde

=== Sister Cities Cup ===
Semi-Final Match

May 19, 2010	Chicago Fire (United States)	0–1	Paris Saint-Germain (France)	Bridgeview, Illinois
7:00 pm ET			Chantome 14'	Stadium: Toyota Park; Attendance: 9,254; Referee: Chris Penzo

Third Place Match

May 22, 2010	Chicago Fire (United States)	0–3	Legia Warsaw (Poland)	Bridgeview, Illinois
7:00 pm ET		Report	Iwański 59'; Szałachowski 63'; Iwański (yellow card) 75'; Szałachowski 86'	Stadium: Toyota Park; Attendance: 12,234; Referee: Chris Penzo

=== SuperLiga ===
July 14, 2010	Chicago Fire (United States)	1–5	C.A. Morelia (Mexico)	Bridgeview, Illinois
7:00 pm ET	Kinney 49'	[[[Category:All articles with unsourced statements]] report]	Elias Hernandez 4'; Luis Gabriel Rey 34'; Miguel Sabah 40'; Rafael Marquez Lugo 50'; Jaime Arturo Lozano 70'	Stadium: Toyota Park; Attendance: 11,009; Referee: José Vitelio Rivera (El Salvador)

July 17, 2010	Chicago Fire (United States)	0–1	New England Revolution (United States)	Bridgeview, Illinois
7:00 pm ET		Report	Perovic 77'	Stadium: Toyota Park; Attendance: 16,117; Referee: Kevin Stott (United States)

July 20, 2010	Chicago Fire (United States)	1–0	Pumas UNAM (Mexico)	Bridgeview, Illinois
7:00 pm ET	Conde 34'	[[[Category:All articles with unsourced statements]] report]		Stadium: Toyota Park; Attendance: 9,429; Referee: Jose Pineda (Honduras)
