= Líder Mármol =

Paraguayan footballer (born 1985)

Personal information
- Full name: Eder Líder Mármol Cuenca
- Date of birth: 2 October 1985 (age 41)
- Place of birth: Juan León Mallorquín, Paraguay
- Height: 1.85 m (6 ft 1 in)
- Positions: Defender; midfielder

Youth career
- 1999–2002: 4 de Agosto

Senior career*
Years	Team	Apps	(Gls)
2002–2004	River Plate Asunción	?	(0)
2004	Sol de América	?	(2)
2004–2006	Guaraní	?	(1)
2007	Hércules	11	(1)
2008	Chicago Fire	2	(0)
2009	12 de Octubre	?	(?)
2009	San Martín San Juan	31	(2)
2010–2011	Atlante	12	(0)
2011–2013	Atlético Tucumán	43	(3)
2014	12 de Octubre	12	(1)

International career
- Paraguay U20
- * Club domestic league appearances and goals

Eder Líder Mármol Cuenca (born 2 September 1985 in Juan León Mallorquín, Alto Paraná) is a Paraguayan retired professional footballer. Marmol holds Italian documentation and counts as a Community player. Marmol was one of the first Paraguayans to arrive at the Major League Soccer. ABC Color branded his career as being made with much sacrifice.

== Club career ==
=== Early career ===
In 1999, Marmol began his career at Club Deportivo 4 de Agosto, where he played for 4 seasons until 2002.

After four seasons at the club Mármol moved on to Paraguayan second division side Club Atlético River Plate (Asunción). His play at River started to gain him notice by the countries first division clubs. He was acquired by first division side Club Sol de América where he remained for one year. In 2005, he joined Club Guaraní, helping the club to a second-place finish in the Torneo Apertura. At Guaraní, he played in the defence with Julio Manzur, Gilberto Velázquez and German Centurión.

=== Europe ===
After two successful seasons at Guaraní, Mármol emigrated to Hércules CF in Spain's Second Division. After arriving in Spain during the December European transfer window, together with his Paraguayan compatriot Julio Irrazábal, both signed with a contract of six months with an option to extend to three years. Mármol became a fixture in the center of the defense starting eleven matches and scoring one goal for the Spanish side.

Following Marmol's stint in Spain's Segunda Liga, he trialled with English teams as Coventry City and Reading, however, before signing, his agent ask for a higher amount of money than was stipulated.

=== Chicago Fire ===
On 30 April 2008, it was announced that Marmol joined MLS team Chicago Fire after months of trialling with uncertainty with Chicago Fire and New York Red Bulls under the training of Colombian coach Juan Carlos Osorio. Chicago Fire Director of Football Frank Klopas said "We are very excited to have Líder in our organization. He is a good young player and we are sure he will make the team much stronger". Marmol would officially join the team when he'd receive his P-1 visa and work permit.

On 28 June 2008, Marmol appeared on the bench for Chicago Fire in a 0–0 home draw against San Jose Earthquakes. In this task, he was team mates with Mexican player Cuauhtémoc Blanco. On 1 July 2008, Marmol debuted for Chicago Fire in a Lamar Hunt Open Cup third-round victory against Cleveland City Stars and was praised by the coach. On 6 July 2008, Marmol debuted for Chicago Fire in a 2–2 away draw against Columbus Crew. He was substituted on the field for Justin Mapp in the 86th minute. In this event, Marmol also faced Argentine player Guillermo Barros Schelotto. On 21 September 2008, Marmol made his full debut, second appearance and also his last appearance for Chicago Fire, when he started in a 4–1 home defeat against FC Dallas, playing all of the 90 minutes of the game.

In January 2009, Marmol was granted a release from Chicago Fire following a request submitted by the player.

He amassed 94 minutes for Chicago Fire in 1 start, and appeared on the bench on 9 occasions.

=== Latter career ===
On 20 April 2010, Medio Tiempo reported that Marmol was in the sight of 3 Mexican clubs. He was also mentioned with football in Spain and France.

He retired due to complications of recovery to injuries that he had.

== Statistics ==
League	Appearances	Goals
Liga Paraguaya: Primera División	44	3
Segunda División	11	1
Major League Soccer	2	0

== International ==
Líder Mármol has represented Paraguay at the under 20 level.

== Personal life ==
Marmol was born in the city of Juan León Mallorquín in the Alto Paraná Department.

Whilst living in Luque, more than 200 football jerseys were stolen from him.

From the money he received from his transfer from Guaraní to Spain's Hercules, he bought his mother a house, which was a dream of his whole life.

When he had a free day whilst playing for Chicago Fire, he was invited each week for lunch with the Paraguayans that had lived for years in Chicago. Also, he pointed to the food he wanted to eat when ordering it at a restaurant since he couldn't speak in English.

In October 2010, his sister faked her own kidnapping in an attempt to extort USD $40, 000.00 from Marmol. Marmol told Ultima Hora that he was hurt when he found out that his sister faked her own kidnapping to take money from him. One of Marmol's brother's received a call, reclaiming a pay near to USD $40, 000.00 for the release of his sister. The same day, his sister – who was in debt and had 5 children to maintain – appeared and confessed that she was involved in a self-kidnapping, she was arrested and charger with simulation of a punishable act.

In 2010, Marmol passed Christmas with Atlante teammate Mario Ortiz in Mexico as they lived in the same building.

Since retiring, he began an electronic games business.

In 2020, he was studying to be a football coach.
