= Calen Carr =

American soccer player (born 1982)

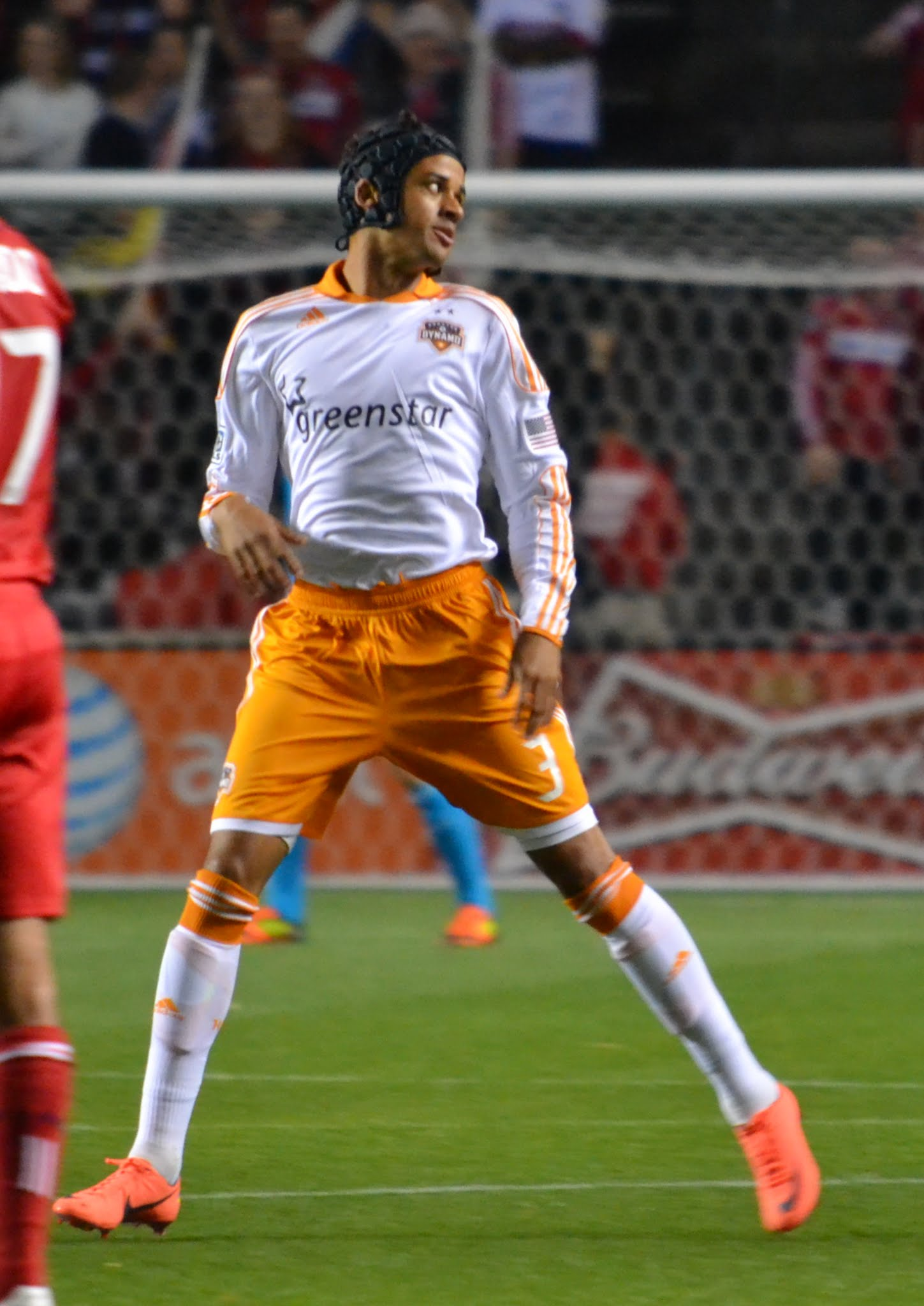
- Carr with Houston Dynamo

Personal information
- Date of birth: October 4, 1982 (age 44)
- Place of birth: Oakland, California, United States
- Height: 6 ft 0 in (1.83 m)
- Positions: Forward; winger

College career
Years	Team	Apps	(Gls)
2001–2005	California Golden Bears	78	(22)

Senior career*
Years	Team	Apps	(Gls)
2004–2005	Orange County Blue Star	18	(12)
2006–2011	Chicago Fire	82	(9)
2011–2013	Houston Dynamo	35	(5)
Total		135	(26)
- * Club domestic league appearances and goals

Calen Carr (born October 4, 1982) is an American former professional soccer player. He played in Major League Soccer for the Chicago Fire and Houston Dynamo as a forward and winger. He currently works for MLS as a match analyst for MLS Season Pass broadcasts on Apple TV and a host on the league's website.

== Career ==
=== High School and College ===
Born in Oakland, California, Carr attended The Branson School in Ross, California until 2001, where he was the team Offensive Player of the Year three times. During this time, Carr trained at the Zico Academy in Brazil.

Carr played college soccer at the University of California, Berkeley, where he finished with 22 goals and 15 assists in 75 matches. He was redshirted in 2003 due to injury. While with the Golden Bears, Carr was named All-Pac-10 First Team three times, as well as being an All-American and the Pac-10 Player of the Year in 2005. In 2019, Carr was inducted into the Cal Athletics Hall of Fame.

He also played with Orange County Blue Star in the USL Premier Development League for two seasons, and in the summer of 2005, trained with Arsenal in England.

=== Professional ===
==== Chicago Fire ====
Carr was drafted in the first round, 10th overall, by the Chicago Fire in the 2006 MLS SuperDraft. He made his Fire debut in the opening match of April 1, 2006, coming on as substitute in a 3–2 loss to FC Dallas. Carr scored his first professional goal on June 11 in the stoppage time against the New England Revolution, however the Revs would score twice soon after, with the game ending 3–3. On June 25, he recorded the first assist of his career in a 2–0 win over the New York Red Bulls. The next match saw him Carr get his first career start, as he helped the Fire to a 2–1 win over Real Salt Lake. He ended the regular season with 1 goal and 1 assist from 22 appearances, however just 3 of them were starts. He appeared off the bench in both legs of Chicago's playoff matchup with New England, with the Revolution advancing on penalties. In the 2006 U.S. Open Cup, Carr scored three goals and one assists as he helped the Fire win the Open Cup.

On May 17, 2007, Carr scored his first goal of the season in a 2–1 loss to FC Dallas. On July 29, he had a goal and an assist in a 3–0 win over Toronto FC. On October 21, he had an assist in the 93rd minute to give Chicago a 1–- 0win over the Los Angeles Galaxy. Carr finished the regular season with 27 appearances, 10 of them starts, 3 goals and 2 assists, helping the Fire qualify for the playoffs. After a 1–0 win for the Fire in the first leg of the Conference Semifinals, Carr had 2 assists to give the Fire a 2–2 draw in leg 2, advancing past D.C. United. He came off the bench in the Conference Final as Chicago lost 1–0 to New England.

Carr scored his first goal of the 2008 season on May 17 in a 2–1 loss to the Houston Dynamo. On July 1, Carr scored once in a 4–1 win over the Cleveland City Stars in the U.S. Open Cup. He found the back of the net in Chicago's next match to help the Fire to a 2–2 draw with the Columbus Crew. On July 8, Carr tore his right ACL during a 2–1 loss to D.C. United in the Open Cup quarterfinals. He missed the rest of the season due to the injury, having made just 9 appearances up to that point in the regular season.

Carr returned to the field on July 4, 2009, coming on as a late substitute in a 2–1 win over the Colorado Rapids. He would make 10 appearances in 2009, all of them off the bench. He did not play in any of the three playoff games for Chicago.

On February 8, 2010, Carr signed a new contract with Chicago. He missed the first 4 months of the season due to a quadriceps injury suffered during preseason. On August 18, Carr made his first appearance of the season, coming on as a substitute and scoring the winning goal in a 2–1 win over the New England Revolution. In Chicago's next match, Carr scored as a sub again, however this time the Fire lost 4–3 to Houston. Carr ended the season with 3 goals from 14 appearances, 4 of them being starts.

While playing for the Chicago Fire, Carr participated in an off-season friendly playing for Chivas USA against their sister club, C.D. Guadalajara. Carr drew a penalty as the two sides drew 1-1.

During the 2011 preseason Carr suffered a serious concussion.

==== Houston Dynamo ====
On March 23, 2011, Carr was traded to the Houston Dynamo in exchange for Dominic Oduro. He made his Dynamo debut on August 17, 2011, coming on as a substitute in a 1–1 draw with the New England Revolution. During the game, Carr wore a protective helmet for the first time, something he would do throughout the rest of his career. On September 14, he came off the bench and scored in the 86th minute to give Houston a 2–2 draw with the Columbus Crew. He ended the regular season with 1 goal from 9 appearances, 4 of them being starts. In Houston's opening game of the playoffs, Carr scored to help the Dynamo to a 2–1 win over the Philadelphia Union. Carr would start the second leg of the Conference Semifinals as Houston beat the Union 1–0 to advance. He got the start in the Conference Finals as well, helping the Dynamo beat Sporting Kansas City 2–0 to advance to MLS Cup 2011, where Carr and the Dynamo would lose to the Los Angeles Galaxy 1–0.

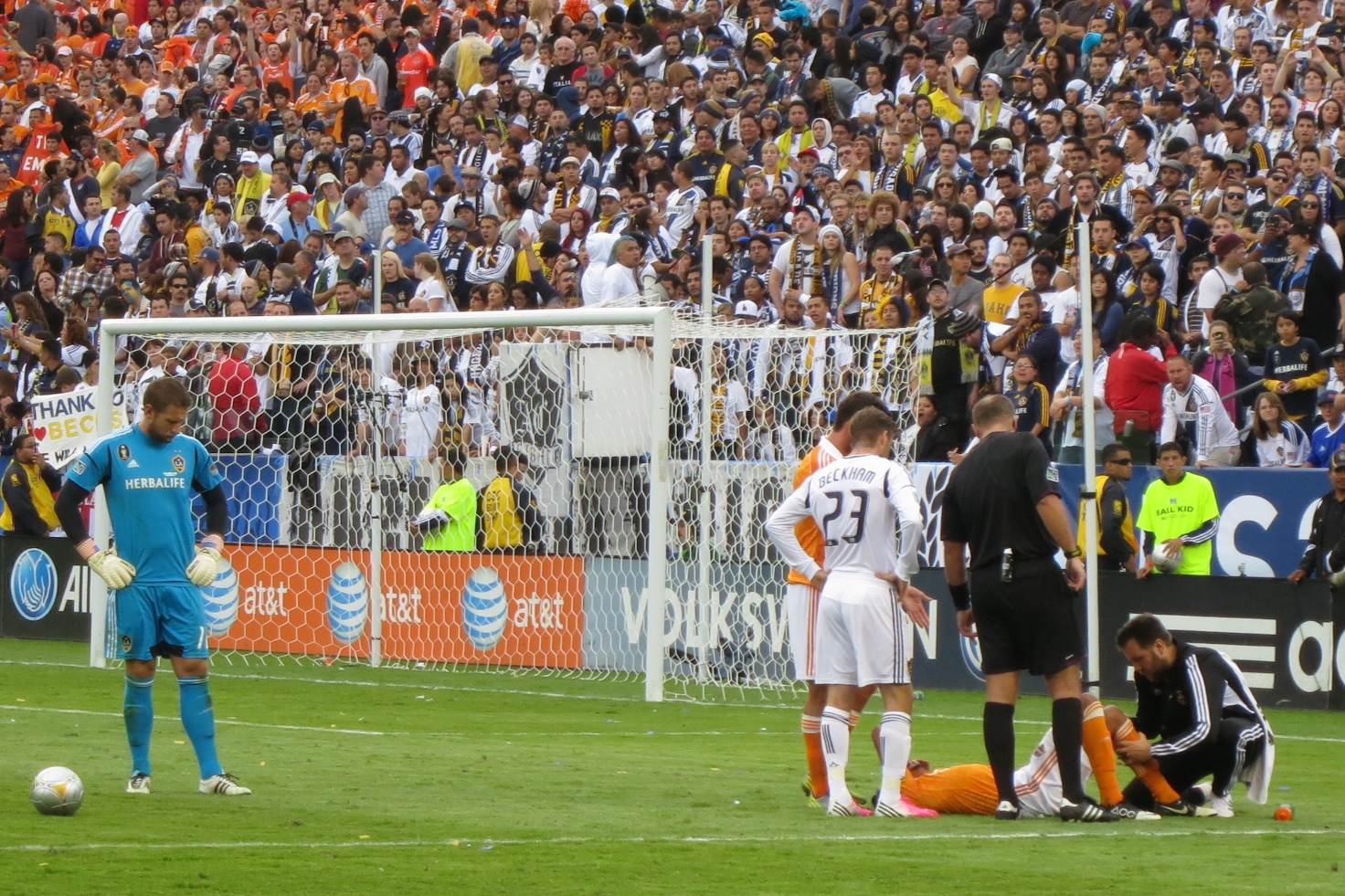
Calen Carr lies injured during MLS Cup 2012.

Carr underwent surgery on his left knee ahead of the 2012 season. Houston opened the 2012 season on March 11 with a 1–0 win over Chivas USA, with Carr coming off the bench in the game. On June 16, he suffered a left hamstring strain during a 2–1 win over FC Dallas, forcing him to miss 5 games. He returned from the injury on July 15, making a substitute appearance in a 4–0 win over D.C. United. In Houston's next match, Carr scored twice to give the Dynamo a 2–1 win over Sporting Kansas City, On July 21, he picked up his first assist of the season in a 3–0 win over the Montreal Impact. On July 28, he scored in a 2–0 win against Toronto FC. Carr found the back of the net again in Houston's next game, a 2–0 win over the New York Red Bulls. On September 20, Carr played in his first career CONCACAF Champions League match, scoring once in a 4–0 win against C.D. FAS. He ended the regular season with 4 goals and 2 assists from 27 appearances. In the first match of the playoffs, Carr had an assist to help the Dynamo defeat the Chicago Fire 2–1. In leg 1 of the Conference Semifinals, he had an assist to help Houston to a 2–0 win over Sporting Kansas City. In the second leg, Carr went down with a left hamstring strain, but the Dynamo would still advance. He would miss both legs of the Conference Finals, but the Dynamo would advance past D.C. United 4–2 on aggregate. He returned from his hamstring injury to start MLS Cup 2012. In the 44th minute Carr scored to put Houston up 1–0 over the Los Angeles Galaxy through one half. However, he would leave the game less than 10 minutes into the second half due to a torn left ACL. Los Angeles would go onto win 3–1.

Carr did not make any first team appearances in 2013 as a result of the injury, but he did make an appearance with the Dynamo reserves, scoring in the game. He retired after the 2013 season.

== Post-playing career ==
Since 2016, Carr has worked as a host for various shows on MLS's website and YouTube channel, including "The Movement" documentary series and the "Extratime" podcast.

== Personal life ==
Carr was born in Oakland, California and raised in nearby Berkeley, but spent significant time traveling around the world with mother, Claudia Carr, who was a professor at University of California, Berkeley. His mom is white from Indianapolis, Indiana while his dad is Aboriginal Australian from Alice Springs, Northern Territory. He founded a clothing company called Future Collective with two friends.

== Career statistics ==
Appearances and goals by club, season and competition
Club	Season	League			Playoffs		Open Cup		CONCACAF		Total	
Club	Season	Division	Apps	Goals	Apps	Goals	Apps	Goals	Apps	Goals	Apps	Goals
Chicago Fire	2006	MLS	22	1	2	0	3	3	—		27	4
Chicago Fire	2007	MLS	27	3	3	0	1	0	—		31	3
Chicago Fire	2008	MLS	9	2	0	0	3	1	—		12	3
Chicago Fire	2009	MLS	10	0	0	0	0	0	0	0	10	0
Chicago Fire	2010	MLS	14	3	—		0	0	0	0	14	3
Chicago Fire	Total		82	9	5	0	7	4	0	0	94	13
Houston Dynamo	2011	MLS	9	1	4	1	0	0	—		13	2
Houston Dynamo	2012	MLS	26	4	4	1	0	0	2 (Note: Appearances in CONCACAF Champions League)	1	32	6
Houston Dynamo	2013	MLS	0	0	0	0	0	0	0	0	0	0
Houston Dynamo	Total		35	5	8	2	0	0	2	1	45	8
Career total			117	14	13	2	7	4	2	1	139	21

== Honors ==
Chicago Fire

- U.S. Open Cup: 2006

Houston Dynamo

- MLS Eastern Conference: 2011, 2012

Individual

- Pac-10 Conference Men's Soccer Player of the Year: 2005
