= Tyler Kettering =

American soccer player

Personal information
- Date of birth: July 24, 1984 (age 42)
- Place of birth: Xenia, Ohio, United States
- Height: 6 ft 1 in (1.85 m)
- Position: Goalkeeper

Youth career
- 2003–2006: Gardner–Webb

Senior career*
Years	Team	Apps	(Gls)
2005	Southern California Seahorses	2	(0)
2007	Wilmington Hammerheads	10	(0)
2008–2009	Chicago Fire	0	(0)
- * Club domestic league appearances and goals as of 13:44, August 31, 2008 (PDT)

Tyler Kettering (born July 24, 1984) is an American former professional soccer player who played as a goalkeeper.

He played college soccer at Gardner–Webb University, where he was a 4-year starter and 3-year captain. When he graduated, he signed with Wilmington Hammerheads of USL Second Division. He appeared in 10 matches (900 minutes) and posted 2 wins and 3 shutouts with 51 saves. He was not retained by the team following the season.

Kettering signed a developmental contract to join Fire's 28-man roster for the 2008 season.
