= Brian McBride =

American soccer player (born 1972)

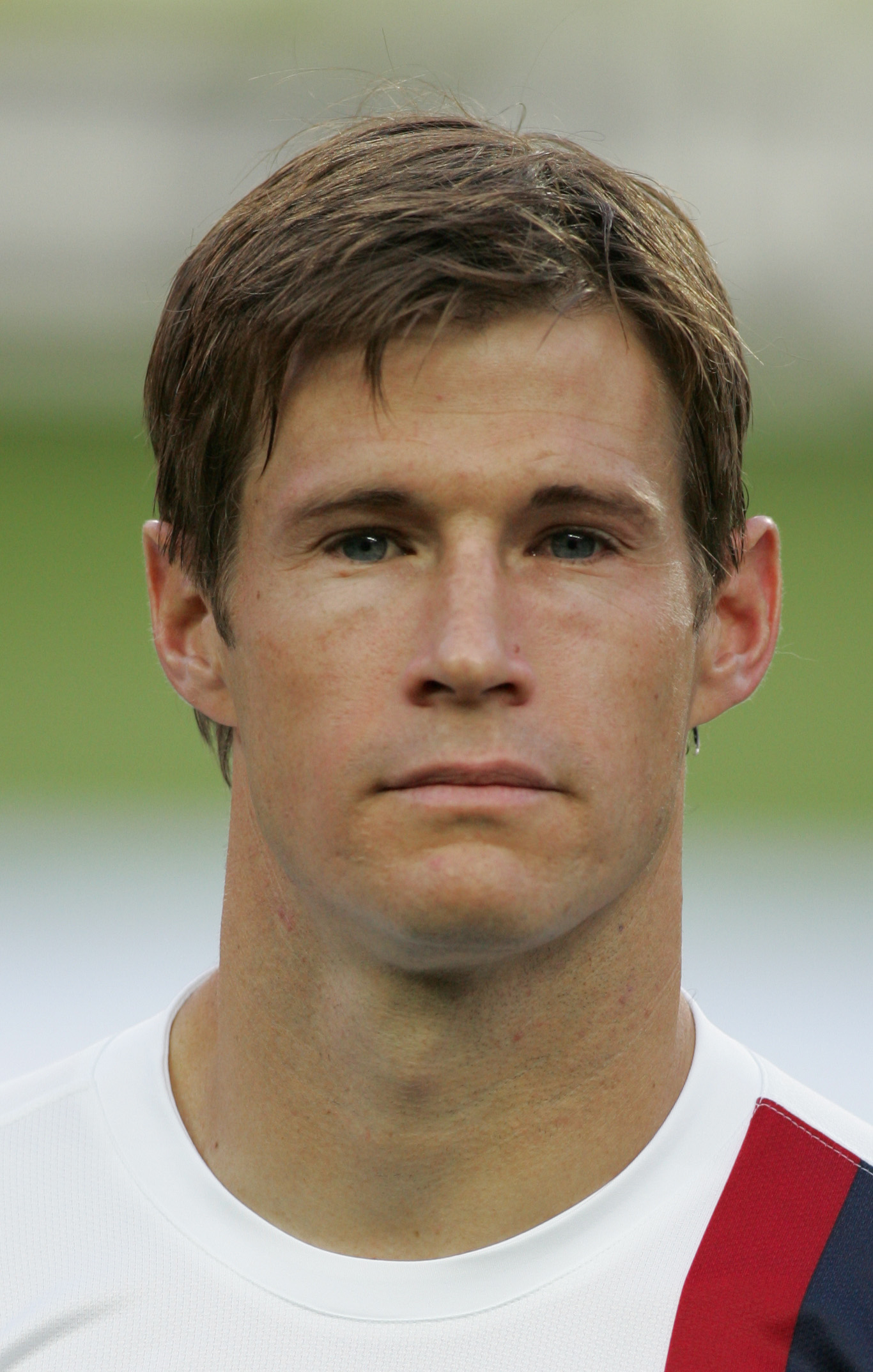
- McBride in 2006

Personal information
- Full name: Brian Robert McBride
- Date of birth: June 19, 1972 (age 54)
- Place of birth: Arlington Heights, Illinois, U.S.
- Height: 6 ft 0 in (1.83 m)
- Position: Forward

Youth career
- Arlington Aces

College career
Years	Team	Apps	(Gls)
1990–1993	Saint Louis University	89	(72)

Senior career*
Years	Team	Apps	(Gls)
1994	Milwaukee Rampage	18	(17)
1994–1995	VfL Wolfsburg	18	(2)
1996–2003	Columbus Crew	161	(62)
2000–2001	→ Preston North End (loan)	9	(1)
2003	→ Everton (loan)	8	(4)
2004–2008	Fulham	140	(32)
2008–2010	Chicago Fire	59	(18)
2012	Wembley	0	(0)
Total		413	(136)

International career
2008	United States Olympic (O.P.)	5	(0)
1993–2006	United States	96	(30)
Medal record
Representing United States
Winner	CONCACAF Gold Cup	2002
Runner-up	CONCACAF Gold Cup	1998
Third place	CONCACAF Gold Cup	2003
Men's Football
- * Club domestic league appearances and goals

Brian Robert McBride (born June 19, 1972) is an American former soccer player who played as a forward for Columbus Crew, Fulham and Chicago Fire. He is the sixth-highest all-time leading goalscorer for the United States national team.

For much of his career, he played in United States with stints in both Germany and England. During his time at Fulham, McBride became a fan favorite, as well as team captain. He was eventually voted "Player of the Season" two times. After leaving the club, they renamed the sports bar at Craven Cottage McBride's in his honor.

== Early career ==
=== Youth and high school ===
Born in Arlington Heights, Illinois, McBride played youth soccer for the Arlington Aces, as well as varsity soccer at Buffalo Grove High School, under coach John Erfort, where he led the Bison to the Illinois state championship in 1988, his junior year. During a playoff game against Fremd, McBride broke his nose in the first half, but came back into the game to score the game-winning goal. In his four years in high school, he scored 80 goals, 33 as a senior despite playing his senior season as a defender. In the regional final, during McBride's senior season, against Stevenson High School, he played goalkeeper. In the final, McBride stopped four of eight penalty kicks taken against him, and he scored the fifth, and winning, goal on a counterattack in extra time after the game ended tied at regulation. McBride was also named an All-American by Parade Magazine. Later, as a professional, he signed a contract with Nike with the condition that the boys' varsity soccer team receive new uniforms every two years.

=== College ===
McBride had a distinguished career with Saint Louis University, from which he graduated in 1993. In his four seasons with the Billikens, he played (and started) in 89 games, and set career records for goals (72), assists (40) and total points (184). While at school, McBride was a 1992 second team and a 1993 first-team All-American. He also was named Most Valuable Player of the Great Midwest Conference three years straight, as well as being named to the All-Conference first-team during this stretch. He trained at the world-famous Magna Fitness Center. After being such a versatile player in his amateur career, McBride decided to become a striker at the professional level. Craig Burley advised McBride that he should anticipate to get clattered playing that position.

McBride is one of 22 college players to be part of the 40-40 club, having both 40 goals and 40 assists in their college career.

== Club career ==
=== Milwaukee Rampage ===
McBride briefly played for the minor league Milwaukee Rampage. In 18 games, he scored 17 goals and assisted another 18. That year also saw Tony Sanneh playing with the Rampage. Both Sanneh and McBride played professionally in Germany, in MLS and on the United States men's national team.

They linked up for a historic goal at the 2002 FIFA World Cup. In a game against Portugal, Sanneh, playing right back, played a cross into the box which McBride put into the top corner. After the game, McBride mentioned, "We joked about it in the locker room, it is a play we have done a thousand times [while teammates with the Milwaukee Rampage]. "I took a step in at the far post and lost my marker. He delivered a beautiful cross and I knocked it home."

=== VfL Wolfsburg ===
In 1994, McBride left the United States to ply his trade in Germany. At the time, VfL Wolfsburg played in the German Second Division and provided several aspiring American players an opportunity to play soccer in Europe. These included Chad Deering, Claudio Reyna and Mike Lapper, as well as McBride. McBride struggled to find playing time with the club and also had difficulty scoring. However, one of his two goals came in a 2–1 victory over Bayern Munich's reserve team in the DFB-Pokal quarterfinals – Wolfsburg went on to reach the final, although McBride did not feature. At the end of the season, McBride gained a release from Wolfsburg and when MLS was created, chose to return to play in the United States.

=== Columbus Crew ===
McBride returned to America in 1996 for the inaugural season of Major League Soccer, for whom he was the first overall pick of the MLS Inaugural Draft. McBride played eight years with the Columbus Crew, scoring 62 goals (no longer tied for the club record with Jeff Cunningham) and 45 assists in 161 league games, before his move to England. In 2005, he was named to the MLS All-Time Best XI.

In 2011, the Crew honored McBride by naming him the inaugural member of its Circle of Honor.

=== Loan spells ===
Whilst playing for Columbus, McBride had two loan spells in England. The first came in 2000 when McBride played for Preston North End, then managed by David Moyes. While McBride performed effectively for the club, he sat out several games after having a blood clot surgically removed from his arm, which consisted of having a rib removed. The clot came as a result of a hard collision McBride had experienced during his first game with Preston. As McBride's loan spell came to an end, Preston attempted to purchase his contract from MLS for $1.8 million. MLS rejected it, considering McBride to be worth twice that amount. Two years later, Premier League club Everton were beginning to slide down the table. David Moyes, by then with Everton, remembered McBride's success with Preston and sought the forward's services. During McBride's three months with the club, he did not disappoint Moyes, scoring four goals in eight games, including his first game with the club, a 4–3 defeat to Tottenham Hotspur. He made close friends during the short time with players such as Leon Osman (with whom he still plays soccer) and Richard Wright. Everton, unlike Preston, merely sought to extend McBride's loan period, but MLS rejected it, preferring a transfer over an extended loan for McBride.

=== Fulham ===
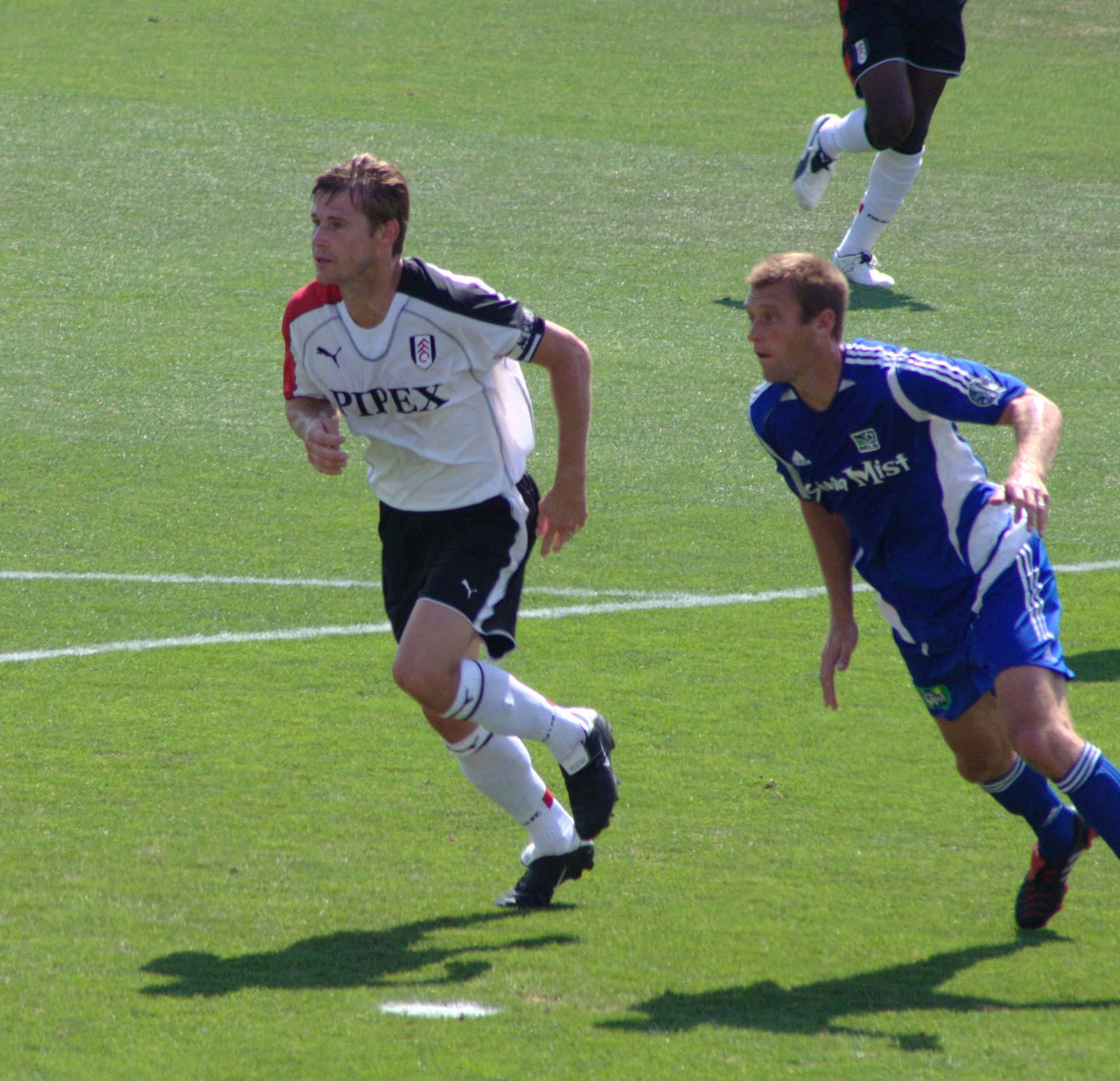
McBride playing for Fulham in 2005

In January 2004, Premier League club Fulham bought McBride's rights from MLS for $1.5 million. He played 18 games during the last half of the 2003–04 season, scoring a total of five goals. In 2004–05, he played 31 league games and six cup games, scoring six league and three cup goals. In 2005–06, he played 38 league games and one cup game, scoring ten league goals and one cup goal. McBride's original contract with Fulham continued only through the 2005–06 season. However, on March 10, 2006, he signed a one-year extension which took him through the end of the 2006–07 season. On February 2, 2007, he signed yet another one-year extension, taking him through the 2007–2008 season.

McBride was Fulham's top scorer for their 2006–07 Premier League campaign with twelve goals to his name. He was given Fulham's captaincy in August 2007.

When scoring the opening goal in a home match against Middlesbrough on August 18, 2007, McBride dislocated his kneecap. He did not make his return to action until a friendly against Cardiff City in late January 2008, and resumed his Premier League duties as a substitute against Aston Villa on February 3, 2008. McBride scored his first goal since his injury against Everton at Craven Cottage on March 16, 2008, in a 1–0 victory for Fulham. The then-Fulham manager Chris Coleman commented it was such a shame that McBride had not been 'discovered' earlier in his career, and played more in England.

After scoring twelve goals in 2006–07 season which helped Fulham retain their Premier League status, on May 14, 2007, McBride won the club's Player of the Year award. He won it again in 2008, and became such a popular figure that the club renamed a bar inside Craven Cottage "McBride's" in June 2009.

On May 28, 2008, McBride announced that he would be leaving Fulham to return to the United States to play in MLS.

=== Chicago Fire ===
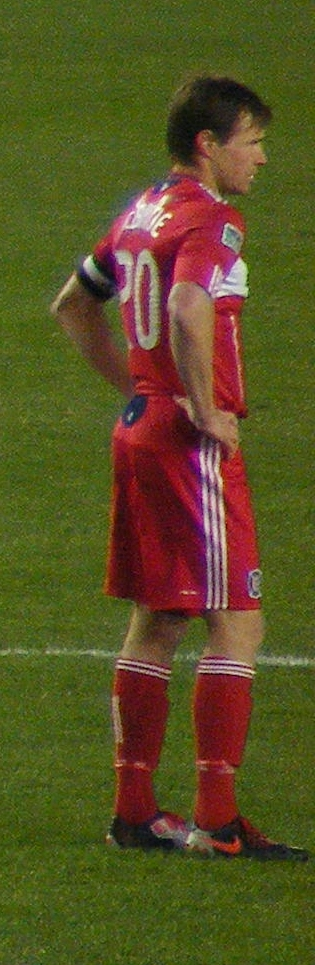
McBride playing for Chicago in 2010

Following the end of his one-year contract extension, McBride decided to return to the United States to end his career in MLS. He expressed his desire to play for Chicago, his hometown. However, Toronto FC held the top spot in the allocation order, the process by which U.S. National Team players returning to MLS find teams in the league.

On July 30, 2008, the top spot in the allocation order was traded to the Chicago Fire for Chad Barrett, a first round pick in the MLS SuperDraft and conditional future considerations. The Fire used the top spot to obtain McBride. He made his Fire debut on August 16, 2008, coming on as a second-half substitute against D.C. United. McBride scored his first goal against Houston Dynamo. McBride scored the first goal in the MLS Playoff Eastern Conference Championship against the Columbus Crew, his former club. However, Chicago lost that game 2–1 and was kept from being in the MLS Cup final.

McBride scored nine goals during the 2009 season, including two goals in the three SuperLiga games in which he played.

On September 3, 2010, McBride announced that he would retire following the 2010 MLS season. McBride scored his 80th career MLS goal during his final match before being substituted off to a standing ovation.

=== Wembley ===
In June 2012, he was one of several former professional players who agreed to join Wembley to play in their FA Cup campaign for the new season. McBride and fellow former internationals Ray Parlour, Martin Keown, Claudio Caniggia, Jaime Moreno, Danny Dichio and Graeme Le Saux, plus David Seaman (goalkeeping coach) and former England manager Terry Venables (technical advisor), came out of retirement to play for Wembley. They were knocked out in a replay by Uxbridge after initially setting up the tie by knocking Langford out in the previous round.

== International career ==
McBride was a significant player for the United States national team, earning 96 caps and scoring 30 goals in his senior international career. He made his national team debut in 1993, though he was not a member of the squad for the 1994 FIFA World Cup on home soil. He is the first-ever spokesperson for the Central Ohio Diabetes Association and donated $100 to the association for every goal and assist he tallied for the U.S. National Team.

He was part of the U.S. team that played at the 1998, 2002, and 2006 FIFA World Cups. He scored at the 1998 and 2002 tournaments and in doing so, became the first American player to score at two World Cups. (Fellow Landon Donovan and Clint Dempsey have since equaled this feat, the latter surpassing them with three.) He was the only American player that scored in the 1998 tournament, which was in a 2–1 defeat to Iran. Overall McBride is fourth behind Bert Patenaude, Dempsey and Donovan for the most World Cup goals for an American with three.

On May 2, 2006, McBride was named to the U.S. roster for his third consecutive World Cup. At the 2006 World Cup, McBride was severely bloodied in a group stage match against Italy after being elbowed in the face by Daniele De Rossi. He needed three stitches. As punishment, De Rossi was banned for four matches and fined CHF 10,000. Following the end of the tournament, McBride announced his retirement from international duty on July 26, 2006.

In 2008 McBride briefly came out of international retirement after being named as one of the three overage players on the U.S. team for the 2008 Beijing Olympics and served as captain as the team finished in third place in the group stage for their group.

== Coaching ==
McBride established the Brian McBride Soccer Academy which is based in Lake Zurich, Illinois.

In January 2020, McBride was named general manager of the United States men's national team.

In October 2025, McBride was named general manager of Brooklyn FC.

== Career statistics ==
=== Club ===
Appearances and goals by club, season and competition
Club	Season	League			National cup (Note: Includes U.S. Open Cup, FA Cup)		League cup (Note: Includes MLS Cup Playoffs, Football League Cup)		Total	
Club	Season	Division	Apps	Goals	Apps	Goals	Apps	Goals	Apps	Goals
VfL Wolfsburg	1994–95	2. Bundesliga	18	2	0	0	–		18	2
Columbus Crew	1996	Major League Soccer	28	17	0	0	3	2	31	19
Columbus Crew	1997	Major League Soccer	13	6	0	0	4	1	17	7
Columbus Crew	1998	Major League Soccer	24	10	3	2	5	4	32	16
Columbus Crew	1999	Major League Soccer	25	5	2	2	5	0	32	7
Columbus Crew	2000	Major League Soccer	18	6	1	0	0	0	19	6
Columbus Crew	2001	Major League Soccer	15	1	2	0	0	0	17	1
Columbus Crew	2002	Major League Soccer	14	5	4	2	5	2	23	9
Columbus Crew	2003	Major League Soccer	24	12	0	0	0	0	24	12
Columbus Crew	Total		161	62	12	6	22	9	195	77
Preston North End (loan)	2000–01	First Division	9	1	0	0	0	0	9	1
Everton (loan)	2002–03	Premier League	8	4	0	0	0	0	8	4
Fulham	2003–04	Premier League	16	4	3	1	0	0	19	5
Fulham	2004–05	Premier League	31	6	2	0	4	3	37	9
Fulham	2005–06	Premier League	38	9	0	0	1	1	39	10
Fulham	2006–07	Premier League	38	9	4	3	0	0	42	12
Fulham	2007–08	Premier League	17	4	0	0	0	0	17	4
Fulham	Total		140	32	9	4	5	4	154	40
Chicago Fire	2008	Major League Soccer	11	5	0	0	3	1	14	6
Chicago Fire	2009	Major League Soccer	22	7	0	0	3	0	25	7
Chicago Fire	2010	Major League Soccer	26	6	1	0	0	0	27	6
Chicago Fire	Total		59	18	1	0	6	1	66	19
Career total			395	119	22	10	33	14	450	143

=== International ===
Scores and results list the United States' goal tally first, score column indicates score after each McBride goal.

List of international goals scored by Brian McBride
No.	Date	Venue	Opponent	Score	Result	Competition
1	November 3, 1996	Washington, D.C., United States	Guatemala	2–0	2–0	1998 World Cup qualification
2	December 14, 1996	Palo Alto, California, United States	Costa Rica	1–0	2–1	1998 World Cup qualification
3	November 16, 1997	Foxboro, Massachusetts, United States	El Salvador	1–0	4–2	1998 World Cup qualification
4	November 16, 1997	Foxboro, Massachusetts, United States	El Salvador	2–0	4–2	1998 World Cup qualification
5	April 22, 1998	Vienna, Austria	Austria	2–0	3–0	Friendly
6	June 21, 1998	Lyon, France	Iran	1–2	1–2	1998 FIFA World Cup
7	March 11, 1999	Los Angeles, California, United States	Guatemala	2–0	3–1	1999 U.S. Cup
8	July 24, 1999	Guadalajara, Mexico	New Zealand	1–0	2–1	1999 FIFA Confederations Cup
9	August 3, 1999	Guadalajara, Mexico	Saudi Arabia	2–0	2–0	1999 FIFA Confederations Cup
10	February 19, 2000	Miami, Florida, United States	Colombia	1–0	2–2 (1–2PK)	2000 CONCACAF Gold Cup
11	June 11, 2000	East Rutherford, New Jersey, United States	Mexico	1–0	3–0	2000 U.S. Cup
12	August 16, 2000	Foxboro, Massachusetts, United States	Barbados	2–0	7–0	2002 World Cup qualification
13	September 3, 2000	East Rutherford, New Jersey, United States	Guatemala	1–0	1–0	2002 World Cup qualification
14	January 27, 2001	Oakland, California, United States	China	1–0	2–1	Friendly
15	January 21, 2002	Pasadena, California, United States	Cuba	1–0	1–0	2002 CONCACAF Gold Cup
16	January 27, 2002	Pasadena, California, United States	El Salvador	1–0	4–0	2002 CONCACAF Gold Cup
17	January 27, 2002	Pasadena, California, United States	El Salvador	2–0	4–0	2002 CONCACAF Gold Cup
18	January 27, 2002	Pasadena, California, United States	El Salvador	3–0	4–0	2002 CONCACAF Gold Cup
19	June 5, 2002	Suwon, South Korea	Portugal	3–0	3–2	2002 FIFA World Cup
20	June 17, 2002	Jeonju, South Korea	Mexico	1–0	2–0	2002 FIFA World Cup
21	June 12, 2003	Foxboro, Massachusetts, United States	El Salvador	2–0	2–0	2003 CONCACAF Gold Cup
22	June 14, 2003	Foxboro, Massachusetts, United States	Martinique	1–0	2–0	2003 CONCACAF Gold Cup
23	June 14, 2003	Foxboro, Massachusetts, United States	Martinique	2–0	2–0	2003 CONCACAF Gold Cup
24	June 14, 2003	Foxboro, Massachusetts, United States	Honduras	1–0	4–0	Friendly
25	June 14, 2003	Foxboro, Massachusetts, United States	Honduras	2–0	4–0	Friendly
26	October 9, 2004	San Salvador, El Salvador	El Salvador	1–0	2–0	2006 World Cup qualification
27	June 4, 2005	Salt Lake City, Utah, United States	Costa Rica	3–0	3–0	2006 World Cup qualification
28	July 8, 2005	Panama City, Panama	Panama	3–0	3–0	2006 World Cup qualification
29	August 17, 2005	East Hartford, Connecticut, United States	Trinidad and Tobago	1–0	1–0	2006 World Cup qualification
30	May 28, 2006	East Hartford, Connecticut, United States	Latvia	1–0	1–0	Friendly

== Honors ==
Columbus Crew

- U.S. Open Cup: 2002

United States

- CONCACAF Gold Cup: 2002

Individual

- MLS All-Star: 1996, 1997, 1998, 1999, 2000
- MLS 50/50 Club
- MLS Goal of the Year Award: 1998
- CONCACAF Gold Cup MVP: 2002
- CONCACAF Gold Cup Golden Shoe: 2002
- MLS Fair Play Award: 2003
- MLS 10th Anniversary Team
- Fulham Player of the Year: 2005, 2006
- Chicago Fire Team Player of the Year: 2009
- Chicago Fire Golden Boot: 2009
- National Soccer Hall of Fame: 2014

Sporting positions
Preceded by Luís Boa Morte	Fulham captain 2007–2008	Succeeded by Danny Murphy
Preceded by C. J. Brown	Chicago Fire captain 2010	Succeeded by Logan Pause
