= MedioTiempo =

Mexican sports website

MedioTiempo logo

MedioTiempo (otherwise known as Medio Tiempo or by its Internet domain, mediotiempo.com) is a Mexican digital sports news website. Medio Tiempo S.A. de C.V. was founded on 15 November 1999 aimed to report on soccer. It originally operated as futbolitos.com.mx, and reported only local-league soccer match results via pager messages. In February 2000, it became mediotiempo.com.

The idea originated with Patricio Villalobos, who, while staying in Germany, struggled to find results from the Mexican league, particularly those of his favorite team, Pumas UNAM. In 1997, he developed a website managed by his cousin in Mexico. The site functioned like an email service, sending notifications to Villalobos' pager. Later, with the help of Miguel Ramírez Lombana and Sergio González Muñoz de Cote, Villalobos co-founded the company. Muñoz de Cote died shortly afterward and was replaced by his brother, Santiago. Telcel subsequently began offering SMS alerts with notifications from MedioTiempo.

In February 2008, Time Inc. acquired 51 percent of the company and merged it into the Grupo Expansión division. Following the acquisition, the website reached one million users. In 2012, the website signed an agreement with América Móvil to allow the broadcast of Club León games for three years, the first time an Internet platform was allowed to do so. Grupo Expansión was acquired by the Argentine Southern Cross Group in 2014, and in 2017, Grupo Milenio, part of Grupo Multimedios, bought mediotiempo.com.

MedioTiempo has become one of the most important sports news websites in Mexico.
