= Kai Kasiguran =

American soccer player

Personal information
- Date of birth: September 8, 1985 (age 41)
- Place of birth: Oakwood Village, Ohio, United States
- Height: 5 ft 11 in (1.80 m)
- Position: Midfielder

College career
Years	Team	Apps	(Gls)
2004–2007	Messiah Falcons		

Senior career*
Years	Team	Apps	(Gls)
2008	Chicago Fire	0	(0)
2009–2010	Harrisburg City Islanders	31	(1)
- * Club domestic league appearances and goals as of September 22, 2010

Kai Kasiguran (born September 8, 1985, in Oakwood Village, Ohio) is an American soccer player who played for the Harrisburg City Islanders in the USL Second Division.

After his illustrious soccer career, Kai had star turns in local community theatre productions, largely at SALT Performing Arts. Most notably, Kai received critical acclaim for his portrayal of Henry Jekyll and Edward Hyde in Frank Wildhorn's hit gothic musical thriller Jekyll & Hyde. Other roles at SALT include Mr. Andrews in Titanic, the voice of Audrey II in Little Shop of Horrors, a slightly older Jack Kelly in Newsies, Che in Evita, Bob Wallace in White Christmas, and most recently Gaston in Beauty & the Beast where the Silly Girls had little trouble pretending to fawn over his chiseled jaw line and piercing brown eyes.

== Career ==
=== College ===
Kasiguran played college soccer at Messiah College, where he was a four-year starter, He helped lead the team to three straight Division III National Championships (2004–06) and four straight Final Four appearances. He was the Division III Player of the Year in 2007, a four-time All-American, and three-time Conference Player of the Year.

=== Professional ===
Kasiguran was drafted in the first round (12th overall) of the 2008 MLS Supplemental Draft by Chicago Fire, but injuries limited his opportunities with the club.

With smaller roster sizes being applied to MLS clubs, Kasiguran was released by Chicago having never made a first team appearance, and was later signed by the Harrisburg City Islanders of the USL Second Division. He made his professional debut on April 18, 2009, in Harrisburg's 2–2 opening day tie with the Richmond Kickers.
