= Mike Banner =

American soccer player

Personal information
- Full name: Mike Banner
- Date of birth: October 20, 1984 (age 42)
- Place of birth: Washington, D.C., United States
- Height: 5 ft 9 in (1.75 m)
- Positions: Midfielder; left back

College career
Years	Team	Apps	(Gls)
2002	Georgetown Hoyas		
2003–2006	SIU Edwardsville Cougars		

Senior career*
Years	Team	Apps	(Gls)
2007–2011	Chicago Fire	54	(3)
2012–2013	FF Jaro	48	(4)
2014	FC Edmonton	2	(0)
2016	KPV	22	(0)
- * Club domestic league appearances and goals as of July 9, 2016

Mike Banner (born October 20, 1984) is an American former professional soccer player who is currently retired.

== Career ==
=== College ===
Born in Washington, D.C., Banner attended Gonzaga College High School and began his collegiate soccer career at Georgetown University in 2002. He played in 18 matches during his freshman season for the Hoyas, starting 13 games, but transferred to Southern Illinois University, Edwardsville the following season. After sitting out a season he went on to play three more seasons for the Cougars, appearing in 56 matches during his career, scoring 18 goals along the way, and being awarded first team NCAA All-American.

=== Professional ===
Banner was drafted in the third round, 34th overall, by the Chicago Fire in the 2007 MLS SuperDraft. He stayed with Chicago for five seasons. In January 2012, the club announced that Banner would not return for the 2012 season. He later signed with the Illinois Piasa indoor soccer team. In March 2012, Banner signed a two-year contract with Finnish Veikkausliiga side FF Jaro.

Banner signed with FC Edmonton ahead of the 2014 season.
