= Austin Washington =

American soccer player

Personal information
- Date of birth: September 26, 1985 (age 41)
- Place of birth: Spokane, Washington, USA
- Height: 6 ft 0 in (1.83 m)
- Position: Defender

College career
Years	Team	Apps	(Gls)
2004	Whitworth Pirates		
2005–2007	Gonzaga Bulldogs		

Senior career*
Years	Team	Apps	(Gls)
2004–2005	Spokane Shadow	22	(0)
2006	Boulder Rapids Reserve	15	(0)
2007	Spokane Spiders	6	(0)
2008–2009	Chicago Fire	9	(0)
2009	→ Cleveland City Stars (loan)	1	(0)
Total		53	(0)
- * Club domestic league appearances and goals

Austin Washington (born September 26, 1985) is an American academic and former professional soccer player who played as a defender in Major League Soccer.

== Soccer career ==
=== College and amateur ===
Washington attended Joel E Ferris High School.

=== Professional ===
Washington was drafted in the fourth round (54th overall) of the 2008 MLS SuperDraft by Chicago Fire. He was sent on loan to the Cleveland City Stars for one game in early 2009 before returning to complete the season with the Chicago Fire. After appearing in a pre-season exhibition match, he was waived by Chicago Fire ahead of the 2010 season.

== Academic career ==
After working at Phillips Exeter Academy, and Boston University, as of September 2023 Washington was Dean of Flagstaff Cluster and an instructor in Philosophy and Religious Studies at Phillips Academy Andover. He also served as soccer coach for Andover.
