= John Thorrington =

American soccer executive (born 1979)

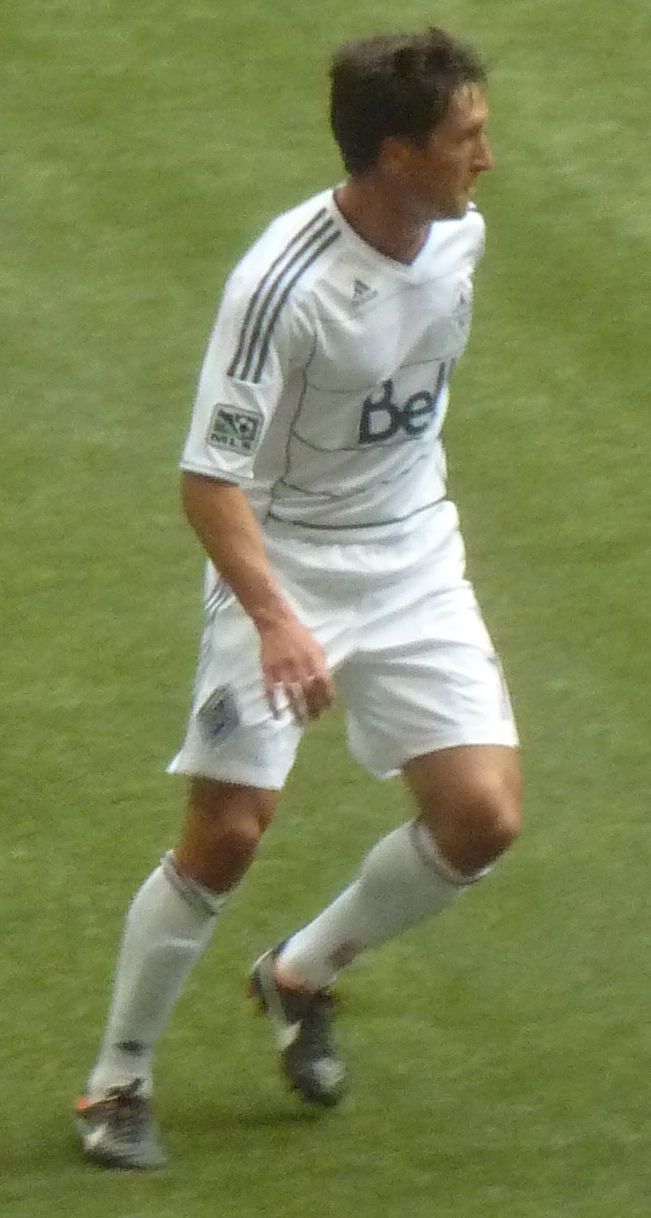
- Thorrington playing for Vancouver Whitecaps FC in 2011

Personal information
- Full name: John Gerard Thorrington
- Date of birth: October 17, 1979 (age 47)
- Place of birth: Johannesburg, South Africa
- Height: 5 ft 8 in (1.73 m)
- Position: Midfielder

Youth career
- Mission Viejo Pateadores
- 1997–1999: Manchester United

Senior career*
| Years | Team | Apps | (Gls) |
| 1999–2001 | Bayer Leverkusen | 0 | (0) |
| 2001–2003 | Huddersfield Town | 67 | (7) |
| 2004 | Grimsby Town | 3 | (0) |
| 2005–2010 | Chicago Fire | 64 | (9) |
| 2011–2012 | Vancouver Whitecaps FC | 35 | (0) |
| 2013 | D.C. United | 14 | (0) |
| Total | | 179 | (16) |

International career^{‡}
| 1999 | United States U20 | 4 | (0) |
| 2001–2008 | United States | 4 | (0) |
- * Club domestic league appearances and goals as of March 19, 2014 ‡ National team caps and goals as of November 24, 2010

John Gerard Thorrington (/ˈθɔːrɪŋtən/, THOR-ing-tən; born October 17, 1979) is a former soccer player who currently serves as co-president and general manager of Major League Soccer club Los Angeles FC.

Although raised in the United States, Thorrington was born in South Africa and started his career as a youth team player in England with Premier League side Manchester United as a midfielder. In 1999, he moved to Germany and signed with Bayer Leverkusen; however, he failed to make the first team with either club and returned to England, where he signed for Huddersfield Town. He later featured for Grimsby Town before moving home to the United States, where he signed with Chicago Fire in 2005. He went on to play for fellow Major League Soccer teams Vancouver Whitecaps FC and D.C. United.

He was capped four times by the United States between 2001 and 2008, having previously also played four times for the United States U20.

== Early life ==
Thorrington was born in Johannesburg to a South African father and Armenian mother, but moved to California at age two. From age four, he began playing in the American Youth Soccer Organization. He was spotted by Octavio Zambrano and invited to join Mission Viejo Pateadores. His mother Monique drove him to training there twice a week. He is the son of South African 400-meter runner Peter Thorrington, who was denied a chance to compete in the Olympics because of the sporting boycott of South Africa during the apartheid era.

== Career ==
=== Early career ===
Thorrington attended the Chadwick School in Palos Verdes Peninsula, California. Thorrington was the CIF-SS Division V Player of the Year in 1996 and 1997. After his junior year of high school and while playing for the Pateadores, Thorrington was spotted by an Englishman, Steve Kelly, who had connections to Manchester United, and Kelly got Thorrington a trial at Manchester United. At age 17, Thorrington signed with Manchester United in 1997. Later, he moved to Bundesliga club Bayer Leverkusen. After his time in Germany, he spent a short spell on trial with Bolton Wanderers in the 2000–2001 season.

=== Huddersfield Town ===
After failing to make a first-team appearance with Manchester United and Leverkusen, Thorrington signed with Huddersfield Town in the summer of 2001 on a free transfer. Huddersfield had recently suffered relegation to the third tier of English soccer and were managed by former Manchester United player Lou Macari. Macari handed Thorrington his full professional debut on August 11, 2001, in a 1-0 league victory over AFC Bournemouth. He scored his first Town goal September 2, 2001 in a 2–1 victory over Wycombe Wanderers. At the end of a promising first season, he developed a hamstring injury, which led to chronic leg troubles. Thorrington said that he considers his debut with Huddersfield Town as one of his favorite moments professionally along with his debuts with the U.S. National Team and the Chicago Fire. Thorrington made 97 appearances and scored seven times during a three-year spell with the Yorkshire club. During the 2002–2003 season, Huddersfield were yet again relegated to the Third Division.

=== Grimsby Town ===
On transfer deadline day in March 2004, Thorrington signed with Grimsby Town on a free transfer until the end of the season. He was brought to the club by Town's newly appointed manager Nicky Law along with veterans Alan Fettis and Paul Warhurst. He made his Mariners debut on March 13, 2004, in a 1–1 draw with Bournemouth. Thorrington would only manage two other appearances for Grimsby and missed the end of the season due to ongoing injury woes. Grimsby suffered relegation at the end of the 2003–2004 season, and with Law dismissed as manager at the end of the season, Thorrington's contract was not renewed.

=== Chicago Fire ===
Thorrington returned to the States and signed with MLS side Chicago Fire in early 2005, but injury problems continued. In mid-2006, during the team's inaugural training session in its new stadium, Thorrington suffered a knee injury. The following season, Thorrington scored his first goal of the campaign on October 21, 2007, netting a stoppage-time strike for the Chicago Fire against the Los Angeles Galaxy that helped send the fire into the MLS Cup playoffs. From that point on, Thorrington formed an integral part of the Chicago midfield. In 2008, he scored five goals and had two assists. Although normally a winger, he played defensive midfield and attacking midfield in the 2009 season due to the absences of Logan Pause and Cuauhtémoc Blanco.

=== Vancouver Whitecaps FC ===
Thorrington was left exposed by Chicago for the November 2010 MLS Expansion Draft and was selected by Vancouver Whitecaps FC. Thorrington injured his right leg and had to undergo surgery early during the 2011 season. After spending 2011 with Vancouver, the club re-signed him for the 2012 season on December 5, 2011. Thorrington's 2013 contract option was declined by Vancouver.

=== D.C. United ===
He elected to participate in the December 2012 MLS Re-Entry Draft, where he was selected by D.C. United in stage two of the draft. He signed with D.C. on January 21, 2013.

== International ==
=== U.S. Under 20 ===
After gaining his U.S. citizenship in January 1999, Thorrington played in nine games for the U.S. U-20 men's team. He was a member of the U.S. U-20 squad that advanced to the second round of the 1999 FIFA World Youth Championship in Nigeria. Thorrington made his U.S. U-20 international debut in a 1–0 victory over Denmark on January 24, 1999. He scored his first international goal in a 1–1 draw with Morocco on October 3, 1999.

=== U.S. Under 23 ===
Thorrington played in four matches for the U.S. Under-23 men's national team in 2000, including three of the U-23's four matches (two starts) in the 2000 CONCACAF Olympic Qualifying Tournament in Hershey, Pennsylvania, helping the squad advance to the 2000 Summer Olympics in Sydney, Australia. His first goal for the U-23s was in a 3–0 victory over Honduras on April 21, 2000, in the opening round of the 2000 CONCACAF Olympic Qualifying Tournament. He was unable to participate in the 2000 Olympics after suffering a hamstring injury leading up to the tournament.

=== U.S. National Team ===
He made his debut coming on for Steve Cherundolo in the 71st minute of a 0–0 draw versus Ecuador on June 7, 2001.

His second cap came seven years later in early-round CONCACAF World Cup qualifying when he came on as a substitute against Barbados on June 22, 2008, with his third cap (and first start) against Guatemala in the last game of the semi-final round. His fourth came in a friendly against Sweden.

In addition to playing four times for the U.S. national team, he was called up to multiple national team camps, including one in January 2009 and another before the 2009 CONCACAF Gold Cup. However, he failed to make another matchday roster.

== Soccer executive ==
After retiring from soccer, Thorrington served as special assistant to MLS Players' Union executive director Bob Foose and received an MBA from Northwestern's Kellogg School of Management. He was named LAFC's first EVP of Soccer Operations and General Manager on December 8, 2015. He presided over 'the best regular-season team in MLS history', as LAFC broke the league record for points with 72, equaled the single-season best with 85 goals and outscored opponents by 48. He was named co-president of LAFC on March 31, 2021.

== Honors ==
=== D.C. United ===
- Lamar Hunt U.S. Open Cup: 2013
