= Peter Lowry (soccer) =

American soccer player and coach

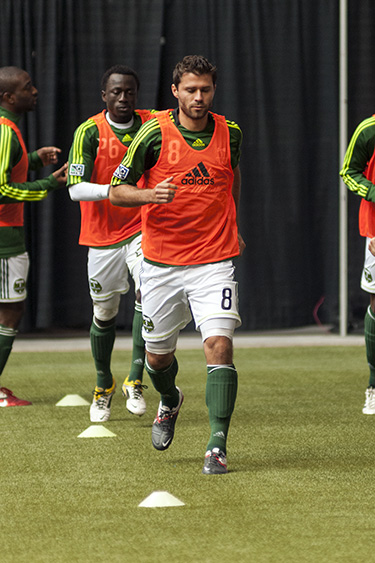

Personal information
- Date of birth: October 2, 1985 (age 41)
- Place of birth: Missoula, Montana, U.S.
- Height: 5 ft 11 in (1.80 m)
- Position: Attacking midfielder

Youth career
- 2000–2004: Irvine Strikers
- 2000–2004: Bella Vista Broncos
- 2003–2004: San Juan SC

College career
Years	Team	Apps	(Gls)
2004–2007	Santa Clara Broncos		

Senior career*
Years	Team	Apps	(Gls)
2004	Ajax Orlando Prospects	2	(0)
2004–2005	Boulder Rapids Reserve	11	(1)
2007	San Jose Frogs	3	(0)
2008–2010	Chicago Fire	24	(5)
2011	Portland Timbers	3	(0)
Total		41	(6)

Managerial career
- 2012–2013: San Juan SC
- 2013–2015: Saint Mary's Geels
- 2014: Walnut Creek Soccer Club
- 2015–: Lipscomb Bisons
- * Club domestic league appearances and goals

Peter Lowry (born October 2, 1985) is an American former soccer player. He is current an assistant coach of Lipscomb Bisons men soccer team.

== Career ==
=== College and amateur ===
Lowry grew up in Fair Oaks, California. He played club soccer for Irvine Strikers under head coach Don Ebert. Lowry played college soccer at Santa Clara University from 2004 to 2007, and played in the USL Premier Development League for Ajax Orlando Prospects, Boulder Rapids Reserve and San Jose Frogs.

=== Professional ===
Lowry was drafted in the second round (26th overall) of the 2008 MLS SuperDraft by Chicago Fire. He made his full professional debut for Fire on 1 July 2008, in a US Open Cup third-round game against Cleveland City Stars. Lowry stayed with Chicago through the 2010 season.

On November 24, 2010, Lowry was selected by Portland Timbers in the 2010 MLS Expansion Draft and spent the 2011 season with Portland. The club announced on November 28, 2011, that it was declining the 2012 contract option for Lowry. Lowry entered the 2011 MLS Re-Entry Draft but was not selected and became a free agent.
