= Wilman Conde =

Colombian footballer (born 1982)

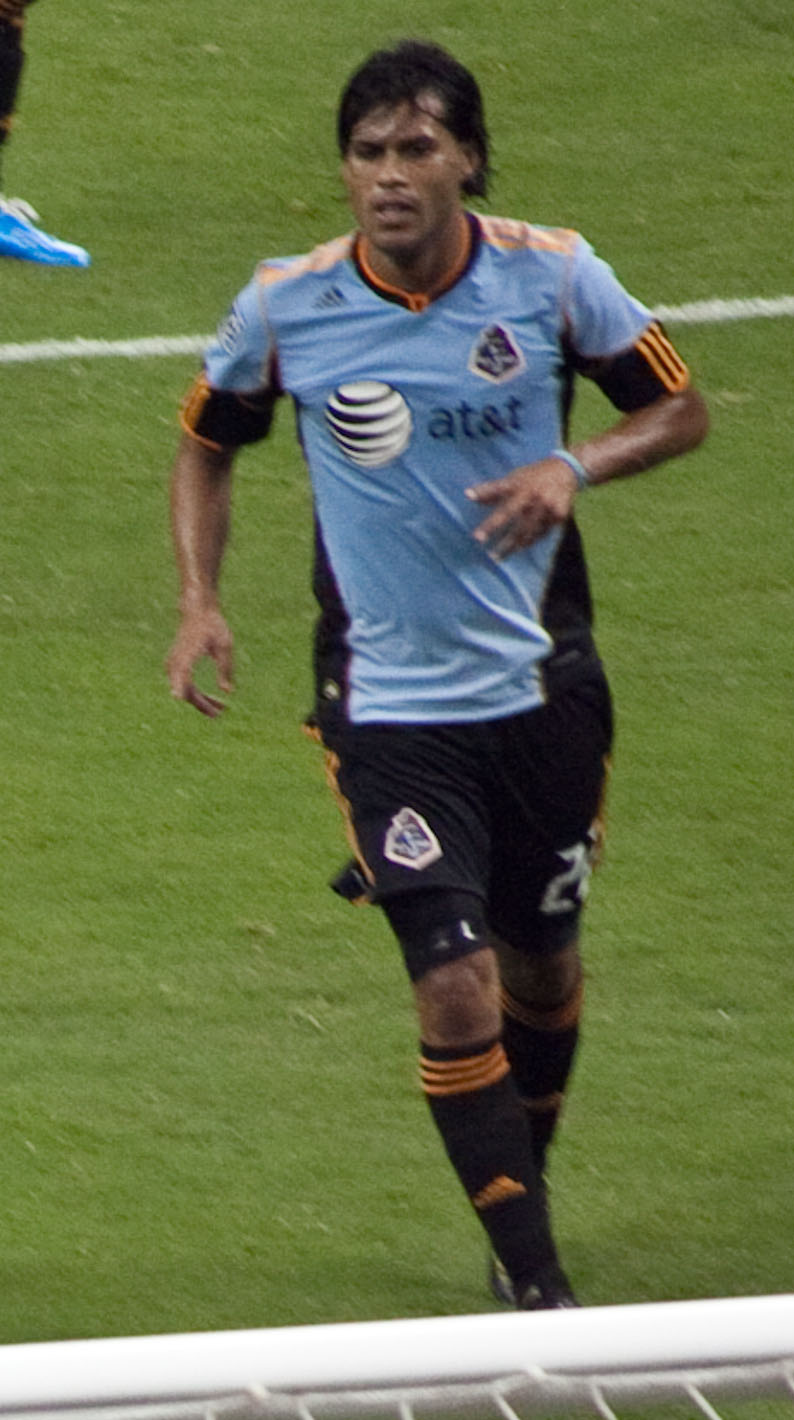

Personal information
- Full name: Wilman Fernando Conde Roa
- Date of birth: 29 August 1982 (age 44)
- Place of birth: Cali, Colombia
- Height: 6 ft 2 in (1.88 m)
- Position: Defender

Youth career
- Deportes Quindío

Senior career*
Years	Team	Apps	(Gls)
2000	Deportes Quindío	12	(0)
2001–2005	Deportivo Cali	67	(0)
2004	→ Cortuluá (loan)	17	(2)
2005	→ Aucas (loan)	14	(1)
2006	Real Cartagena	6	(0)
2006–2007	Millonarios	33	(3)
2007–2010	Chicago Fire	73	(4)
2011	Atlas	13	(2)
2012	New York Red Bulls	17	(1)
Total		252	(13)
- * Club domestic league appearances and goals as of 17:57, 6 October 2012 (UTC)

Wilman Fernando Conde Roa Jr. (born 29 August 1982, in Cali) is a Colombian footballer.

== Career ==
=== Professional ===
Conde made his professional debut with Deportes Quindío during the 2000 campaign. His play at Quindío led to interest from the top Colombian sides, and in 2001 he joined Deportivo Cali and became a fixture at the club for the next three years. In 2004, he went to Cortuluá, followed by a brief spell at Ecuadorean side Aucas. After training with Club Atlético Tigre in Argentina and playing briefly for Real Cartagena, Conde signed with Millonarios and became a fixture in central defense.

After appearing in 33 matches for Millonarios, he was sold to the Chicago Fire of Major League Soccer for about $300,000 due to the money constraints of the Colombian club. Conde left Chicago after four seasons with them in MLS, where he had a lot of personal success with the team, despite not winning any trophies with the club. After a proposed move to Puebla fell through at the last minute, Conde moved to fellow Mexican side Atlas in December 2010. Conde made his debut for Atlas in the Mexican Primera División on 8 January 2011, scoring one goal in a 5–0 victory over Monarcas Morelia. Conde's season with Atlas was cut short as he had to have surgery on his left instep, which sidelined him for the rest of the year. Prior to the start of the 2012 season Conde agreed to terminate his contract with the Mexican club.

After terminating his contract with Atlas, Conde was rumored to be returning to Millonarios or to a club in Major League Soccer. On 30 January 2012, it was announced that New York Red Bulls had obtained the rights to Conde and consequently agreed to terms with the defender.

Following the 2012 season, Conde and the Red Bulls agreed to part ways.

=== International ===
Conde has represented Colombia at the under-15, under-17, under-20 and under-23 levels. In 2000, he helped Colombia win the Toulon Tournament in France.

== Honors ==
=== Individual ===
- MLS Best XI: 2009
- Chicago Fire Defender of the Year: 2009
