= Logan Pause =

American soccer player

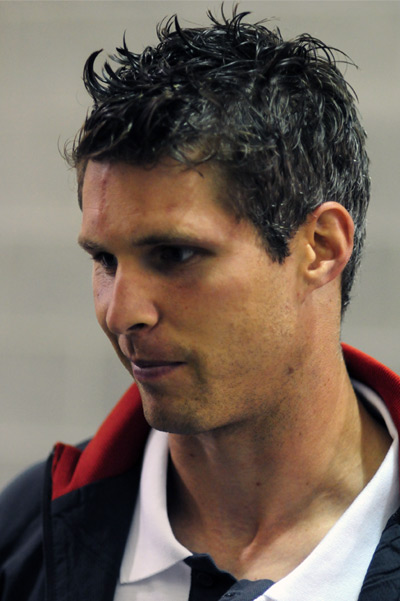

Personal information
- Full name: Logan Allen Pause
- Date of birth: August 22, 1981 (age 45)
- Place of birth: Hillsborough, North Carolina, United States
- Height: 5 ft 10 in (1.78 m)
- Position: Defensive midfielder

Youth career
- 2000–2002: North Carolina Tar Heels
- 2002: Raleigh CASL Elite

Senior career*
Years	Team	Apps	(Gls)
2003–2014	Chicago Fire	286	(4)

International career^{‡}
2004	United States U23	4	(0)
2009–2010	United States	6	(0)

Managerial career
- 2015: Chicago Fire (interim assistant)
- 2016: Chicago Fire U-23
- 2017: Orange County SC
- 2019: Chicago FC United
Medal record
Representing United States
Runner-up	CONCACAF Gold Cup	2009
Men's Soccer
- * Club domestic league appearances and goals as of October 24, 2014 ‡ National team caps and goals as of October 23, 2011

Logan Allen Pause (born August 22, 1981) is an American former soccer player and coach who spent his entire twelve-year professional career with the Chicago Fire in Major League Soccer.

== Playing career ==
=== College and amateur ===
After attending Jordan High School in Durham, North Carolina, Pause played college soccer at the University of North Carolina from 2000 to 2002. After a 2002 season in which he co-captained the Tar Heels and played everywhere from central defense to attacking midfield due to injuries, Pause signed a Project-40 contract with MLS. During the 2002 collegiate off-season, Pause played for the Raleigh CASL Elite of the fourth division Premier Development League.

=== Professional ===
Pause was selected 24th overall in the 2003 MLS SuperDraft by the Chicago Fire. He surprised many by seeing immediate time with the team, finishing the season with 21 appearances and 15 starts for a Fire team that won the MLS Supporters' Shield and the U.S. Open Cup. Pause played the same role for the Fire in 2004, filling in for Jesse Marsch and Chris Armas, starting 19 games and adding two assists.

Pause served primarily as the club's defensive midfielder after Armas retired. He made his 200th league appearance for the Fire on March 26, 2011, in a 3–2 win over Sporting Kansas City.

With the additions of Arévalo Ríos and Jeff Larentowicz in the 2013 MLS season, Pause saw a reduction in playing time, appearing in only 15 matches and starting 11 of those. Following the season's conclusion Pause was made available in the 2013 MLS Re-Entry Draft but eventually agreed to new a contract ahead of the 2014 season.

Logan Pause retired at the end of 2014 MLS season. He spent his entire 12-year professional career playing for the Chicago Fire.

On November 3, 2014, Pause was announced the Vice President of the Chicago Fire Soccer Club.

=== International ===
Pause played for a range of United States youth national teams, including the Under-23's during Olympic Qualifying.

Pause was called up for the United States National Team for the 2009 CONCACAF Gold Cup held in the United States, his first call up to the United States full squad. On July 4, 2009, Pause received his first cap playing the entire 90 minutes against Grenada while also registering an assist on Robbie Rogers' goal.

=== Career statistics ===
Club	Season	MLS			MLS Playoffs		U.S. Open Cup		CONCACAF		SuperLiga		Total	
Club	Season	Division	Apps	Goals	Apps	Goals	Apps	Goals	Apps	Goals	Apps	Goals	Apps	Goals
Chicago Fire	2003	Major League Soccer	23	0	1	0	3	0	0	0	0	0	27	0
Chicago Fire	2004	Major League Soccer	21	0	0	0	4	0	4	0	0	0	29	0
Chicago Fire	2005	Major League Soccer	27	0	3	0	3	0	0	0	0	0	33	0
Chicago Fire	2006	Major League Soccer	25	0	0	0	4	0	0	0	0	0	29	0
Chicago Fire	2007	Major League Soccer	23	1	3	0	1	0	0	0	0	0	27	1
Chicago Fire	2008	Major League Soccer	27	0	3	0	2	0	0	0	0	0	32	0
Chicago Fire	2009	Major League Soccer	26	0	3	0	0	0	0	0	4	0	33	0
Chicago Fire	2010	Major League Soccer	26	1	0	0	1	0	0	0	0	0	27	1
Chicago Fire	2011	Major League Soccer	29	0	0	0	5	0	0	0	0	0	34	0
Chicago Fire	2012	Major League Soccer	32	1	1	0	0	0	0	0	0	0	33	1
Chicago Fire	2013	Major League Soccer	15	1	0	0	2	0	0	0	0	0	17	1
Chicago Fire	2014	Major League Soccer	12	0	0	0	4	0	0	0	0	0	16	0
Career total			286	4	14	0	29	0	4	0	4	0	337	4 Career Balance

Chicago Fire Player Registry

== Coaching career ==
In 2017, Pause was named Head Coach for Orange County SC playing in USL Championship. Following the 2017 USL Season, Pause and OCSC parted ways, announced November 2017.

In 2019 Pause became the head coach of Chicago FC United.

Coaching Record
Year	Team	Division	W	D	L
2017	Orange County SC	USL Championship	11	10	11
2019	Chicago FC United	USL League 2	8	1	3
		Total	19	11	14

== Post soccer life ==
In 2018 Pause joined the Northwestern Medical Group as a program director where he coordinates wellness programs for the group's physicians.

== Honors ==
=== Chicago Fire ===
- Lamar Hunt U.S. Open Cup (2):
  - Winner: 2003, 2006
- MLS Supporters' Shield (1):
  - Winner: 2003

=== Individual ===
- Chicago Fire Most Valuable Player (1):
  - Winner: 2010
- MLS Fair Play Award (1):
  - Winner: 2012
- MLS Humanitarian of the Year Award
  - Winner: 2009

Sporting positions
Preceded by Brian McBride	Chicago Fire captain 2011–2014	Succeeded by Jeff Larentowicz
