= Brandon Prideaux =

American soccer player (born 1976)

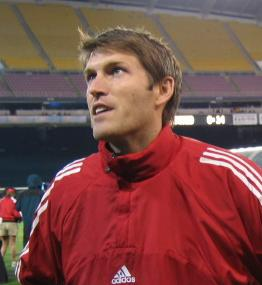

Personal information
- Date of birth: August 18, 1976 (age 50)
- Place of birth: Seattle, Washington, United States
- Height: 6 ft 0 in (1.83 m)
- Position: Defender

Youth career
- 1994–1997: Washington Huskies

Senior career*
Years	Team	Apps	(Gls)
1996	Puget Sound Hammers		
1998	Seattle Sounders	23	(2)
1999–2001	Kansas City Wizards	69	(0)
2002–2006	D.C. United	116	(0)
2007	Colorado Rapids	21	(0)
2008–2009	Chicago Fire	49	(0)
Total		278	(2)

Managerial career
- 2010–: University of Washington (assistant)
- * Club domestic league appearances and goals

Brandon Prideaux (born August 18, 1976) is an American soccer coach and former player who is an assistant coach for the men's soccer team at the University of Washington.

Prideaux spent most of his professional career in Major League Soccer, playing for the Kansas City Wizards, D.C. United, the Colorado Rapids and Chicago Fire. His final game as a professional was on November 14, 2009, when his Fire team lost on penalties to Real Salt Lake in the 2009 MLS Cup Eastern Conference playoff final.

== Early life and college ==
Born in Seattle, Washington, Prideaux is a native of Renton, Washington and a graduate of Kentridge High School. Prideaux played college soccer for the University of Washington from 1994 to 1997.

== Playing career ==
Upon graduating college in 1998, Prideaux joined the Seattle Sounders of the A-League. He excelled for the Sounders, registering two goals and ten assists while leading the team in minutes played.

Prideaux's performance in the A-League attracted the attention of MLS, and he signed with the Kansas City Wizards for the 1999 season; he played in 15 games, starting 8, registering one assist. In his second year with the Wizards, Prideaux seized a starting role, starting all 31 of the games he played in, and helped lead the Wizards to an MLS Cup, playing a part in one of the best defenses in the league's history. Prideaux played with the Wizards one more season, before being traded to D.C. United for Stephen Armstrong prior to the 2002 season.

Prideaux started 53 of 55 games he played for D.C. in 2002 and 2003, but had his starting position challenged in 2004 with the emergence of Josh Gros, and a tactical shift that led the team to play a 3-5-2 formation more often. Nevertheless, he started 16 games, and was a useful role player for the club. In 2005, he resumed his regular role, starting 28 of 29 games, but served primarily as a backup in 2006, playing in only 9 matches after suffering a knee injury. While in D.C., Prideaux coached the NCSL division 1 Arlington Warriors, and led them to great success in Metro area league. Prideaux has yet to score a goal after eight years in MLS and currently holds the record for most matches played without scoring having succeeded Nick Garcia after the latter finally scored his first in June 2006.

On December 15, 2006, D.C. United traded Prideaux to the Colorado Rapids in exchange for two draft picks.

Prideaux was waived by the Colorado Rapids on March 4, 2008, and was picked up by the Chicago Fire in the MLS Waiver Draft.

Prideaux announced his retirement from MLS on June 9, 2009, effective at the end of the season.

== Coaching career ==
Prideaux became an assistant coach at the University of Washington on January 1, 2010. After his MLS career, he returned to his alma-mater where he is currently the assistant coach. His coaching style is known for taking examples of himself and his experience in the MLS.
