= Andrew Hauptman =

American businessman

- Born: 1969 (age 56–57); Fort Walton Beach, Florida
- Education: B.A. Yale University; M.B.A. Harvard University
- Occupations: Co-founder & Chairman of Andell Holdings (1998-present); Owner & Chairman of Chicago Fire FC (2007-2019)
- Spouse: Ellen Bronfman Hauptman
- Relatives: Charles Bronfman (father-in-law)

Andrew Hauptman (born 1969) is an American business executive and philanthropist. In 1998, Hauptman founded the investment firm Andell Holdings, a family office entity.

== Early life ==
Hauptman was born in 1969 on Eglin Air Force Base in Ft. Walton Beach, and raised in Smithtown, New York. His father is a retired pediatrician and his mother is an artist and former college counseling advisor. He graduated with a B.A. from Yale University and an M.B.A. from Harvard Business School. Early in his career, he worked at Alex. Brown & Sons in New York City and later, as an executive with Universal Studios in London, where he played a key role in the oversight of its international operations. In his youth, he was a competitive soccer and tennis player and participated in social service programs in Latin America (Belize) and Sub-Saharan Africa (Lesotho).

== Career ==
=== Andell Entertainment ===
Hauptman previously developed and produced several feature films including State of Play, starring Russell Crowe in 2009, Millions directed by Danny Boyle in 2004, and John Hamburg's directorial debut, Safe Men, which premiered at Sundance in 1998.

=== Andell Holdings ===
Andell invests in private and public companies and real estate, acquiring control and minority stakes, as well as with top-tier investment managers across the globe. Andell has invested in all asset classes and throughout the capital structure.

=== Chicago Fire Soccer Club ===
In 2007, Hauptman's Andell purchased Major League Soccer's Chicago Fire Soccer Club from billionaire Philip Anschutz's AEG for $35 million. Hauptman, who served as chairman, sold the club for $400 million in 2019.

==== Growth ====
During Hauptman's 12-year tenure, the league grew from 12 to 30 teams. Hauptman sat on the league's board of governors and was an active member of MLS governance, holding positions on various league committees including the Expansion, Media, Competition, and Advisory Finance Committees. He was closely involved in the design and creation of MLS' 2014 logo redesign. Under Hauptman, the Fire regularly ranked in the top five in the league in salaries. The team also spent on community programming and resources, working to build excitement for the sport from the ground up.

Notable players under Hauptman's ownership included American star Brian McBride, World Cup Winner Bastian Schweinsteiger, Mexican legends Pavel Pardo and Cuauhtemoc Blanco, and Arsenal star Freddie Ljungberg.

==== Community ====
During Hauptman's ownership, the club funded and expanded several community initiatives. During his tenure, Hauptman constructed the $22 million, 125,000 square foot CIBC Fire Pitch community center on the north side of Chicago serving 300,000 participants annually, launched the Chicago Fire Rec Soccer League (which grew to 20,000 participants), expanded the Chicago Fire Juniors program (from 400 to 16,000 players across six states), and formed the Chicago Fire Academy, one of the first fully scholarshipped programs in the nation, which became a source for star players signed to the first team. Hauptman also expanded the Chicago Fire Foundation and created its award-winning P.L.A.Y.S. (Participate Learn Achieve Youth Soccer) program, which expanded into 30 schools in the Chicago Public Schools district, and formed a partnership with the U.S Soccer Foundation and the city of Chicago to build 50 mini-pitches in underserved neighborhoods across Chicago.

==== Recognition ====
The club received several community and humanitarian awards, including being awarded ESPN's 2019 Sports Humanitarian Team of the Year Award, the 2017 Corporate Citizen of the Year Award by the Executives' Club of Chicago, the 2016 Beyond Sport Team of the Year, winning over other finalists FC Barcelona, Arsenal FC, the San Francisco Giants, and the Detroit Pistons, and the 2015 Robert Wood Johnson Sport Team of the Year. Mayor Rahm Emanuel praised the "key long-term investments" of the Fire and their ability to "drive tourism and bolster Chicago's future by encouraging our youth to engage in sports and spurring economic development across neighborhoods." He also highlighted the "culture of the Chicago Fire," saying "we're a better city because of what you do." Under Hauptman's leadership, Chicago competed against Manchester United in Chicago in 2011 and hosted the 2017 MLS All Star Game vs. Real Madrid, at Soldier Field. The games set TV viewership records with the 2017 All Star Game being watched by viewers in 170 countries. Hauptman was inducted into the Chicagoland Sports Hall of Fame as Sports Advocate of the year in 2017 for his singular commitments to the city and to the sport of soccer.

==== Bridgeview deal ====
According to Forbes, the deal to move the team to Bridgeview, IL which pre-dated Hauptman's purchase of the team, meant the Fire were "saddled with one of the worst stadium deals and restrictive leases in American pro sports" due to a lack of public transportation and contextual economic issues which had historically limited the municipality's investment. Hauptman led a complex and successful multi-year effort to leave Bridgeview and move the team to downtown Chicago and Soldier Field. In 2019, with the support of both Mayors, he brokered deals with the Village of Bridgeview to exit its lease early and closed a three-year deal with the city of Chicago to return to Chicago's Soldier Field, beginning in 2020.

==== Sale ====
In September 2019, after securing the move of the team downtown, Hauptman sold his controlling interest in the Fire to Joe Mansueto, founder of Morningstar, Inc., who had purchased a minority stake a year earlier. Mansueto's purchase valued the franchise at $400 million. Mansueto credits Hauptman for having "developed a tremendous platform for continued soccer growth across Chicago and beyond, worked tirelessly to dramatically increase the profile of the Chicago Fire Soccer Club, MLS, and the game overall and...left a wonderful legacy for our City."

In an interview with Forbes, Hauptman stated that he was satisfied with the club's progress, highlighting its operational growth, management structure and community-focused initiatives. He also described the team's planned move to a downtown stadium as an important development for the club and the city.

=== BSN Sports ===
From 2007 until 2013, Hauptman's holding company Andell co-owned BSN Sports (formerly Sports Supply Group), the largest multi-channel direct marketer, manufacturer and distributor of sporting goods, athletic equipment and team sports apparel in the United States. After acquiring an ownership stake in the publicly traded business in 2007, Hauptman brought ONCAP Management Partners (a part of Onex Corporation) to the table, and alongside management, orchestrated a take-private transaction in 2010.

In June 2013, a strategic buyer purchased BSN. Andell more than quadrupled its investment, representing a 67.6% gross IRR over the last three-year investment period.

=== Storage Mobility/PODS ===
From 2004 through 2014, Hauptman founded, owned, and operated Storage Mobility, the largest franchisee of PODS Enterprises, Inc.

Under Hauptman's tenure as chairman of the board, Storage Mobility launched and operated PODS locations in 21 new markets across the United States. In 2014, Hauptman reached an agreement to merge Storage Mobility with PODS, which was sold in 2015 to Ontario Teachers for $1 billion.

=== Altas Partners ===
In 2013, Hauptman backed the launch of Toronto-based Altas Partners, Canada's largest independent private equity firm, managing more than $9 billion in capital. Hauptman currently serves as an advisor and founding advisory board member. Altas has acquired businesses including NSC Minerals in 2013 (sold to Kissner Group in 2019); Medforth Global Healthcare Education in 2014 (partially sold to Carlyle Group in 2017, with the remaining sale finalized in 2022); and Capital Vision Services/MyEyeDr in 2015, representing 165 optometry centers serving 1.8 million patients in seven states. MyEyeDr grew to 575 practices in 18 states and was sold to Goldman Sachs for $2.7 billion in 2019.

=== Board affiliations ===
Hauptman has been a director of numerous public and private companies. As of 2022, he serves on the advisory board of Altas Partners and Pendulum Holdings. Other for-profit boards on which he serves or has served include:

- Altas Partners
- BSN Sports
- Canyon Ranch Holdings
- Dick Clark Productions
- Koor Industries
- Loews Cineplex Entertainment
- Pendulum Holdings
- Storage Mobility (PODS)

=== Published works ===
Hauptman has been a contributor to CNN.com, The74Million, Huffington Post, and Crain's.

== Philanthropy ==
Hauptman is a board member of the Center for American Progress, a liberal public policy and research and advocacy organization. For more than twelve years, Hauptman served as a National Trustee for City Year Inc., an education nonprofit that recruits young adults to serve as AmeriCorps members in under-resourced schools and communities across the nation and was elected Charter Trustee in 2020. Hauptman also co-founded and led the effort to bring City Year to Los Angeles in 2007, where he served as chairman for nine years and continues as Chair Emeritus. He serves on the Leadership Council of Service Year Alliance and is a co-chair of the organization's “Serve America Together” campaign, which called on 2020 presidential candidates to make national service a priority. Hauptman is also on the advisory board of the Los Angeles Coalition for the Economy and Jobs and the Leadership Council of International Medical Corps.

Hauptman served as president of the Chicago Fire Foundation for twelve years, where he launched the award-winning P.L.A.Y.S. Program. He co-founded and serves as director of the Bronfman Hauptman Foundation, dedicated to social justice, advancements in education, environmental protection, and other philanthropic and civic causes. He is a co-founder and Trustee of the Charles Bronfman Prize, which recognizes young humanitarians whose work is "grounded in their Jewish values and is of universal benefit to all people". Recent laureates include Becca Heller, the co-founder and executive director of International Refugee Assistance Project, Nik Kafka, the founder of Teach a Man to Fish, David Hertz, the co-founder and president of Gastromotiva, and Amy Bach, founder of Measures for Justice.

Hauptman's notable public contributions include the Obama Foundation, the Mayor's Fund for Los Angeles to support those most hurt by the COVID-19 pandemic, and City Year Los Angeles to motivate donors to give in the wake of COVID-19.

Hauptman has been a leading contributor nationally to Democratic candidates.

Hauptman was a leading national donor and fundraiser in the 2020 effort to elect President Biden and Vice President Kamala Harris.

Hauptman has written articles about the value of national service and called for strong funding for such programs.

Civic and philanthropic boards on which he has served include:

- The Bronfman Hauptman Foundation (Co-founder & Director, 2006–present)
- Center for American Progress (Board of Directors, 2020–present)
- The Charles Bronfman Prize (Co-founder & Trustee, 2002–present)
- Chicago Fire Foundation (2007 – 2019)
- City Year (Trustee 2008–2020) (Charter Trustee, 2020 – present)
- City Year Los Angeles (co-founder, 2007; board chair, 2007–2016, 2019–2020; chair emeritus, 2016–present)
- Israel Policy Forum (Advisory Council, 2017–present)
- The Los Angeles Coalition for the Economy and Jobs (Advisory Board, 2015–present)
- Los Angeles Fund for Public Education (Board of Directors, 2011 - 2016)
- Service Year Alliance (Leadership Council & co-chair of Serve America Together campaign)

== Personal life ==
Hauptman is married to Ellen Bronfman Hauptman, the daughter of Canadian businessman Charles Bronfman. They have two children, Lila and Zack. They are members of Sinai Temple, a conservative synagogue.

== Honors and awards ==
- 2017 Chicagoland Sports Hall of Fame (CSHOF) Inductee
- 2017 City Year Honoree
