= Mansueto =

Mansueto may refer to the following people:

Given name

- Mansueto Bianchi (1949–2016), Italian Roman Catholic bishop
- Pietro Mansueto Ferrari (1823–1893), Italian entomologist
- Mansueto Velasco (born 1974), Filipino boxer and comedian

Surname

- Joe Mansueto (born 1956), American billionaire entrepreneur
  - Joe and Rika Mansueto Library in Chicago
  - Mansueto High School in Chicago
- Trizer D. Mansueto, Filipino historian
