= Doong =

- isle
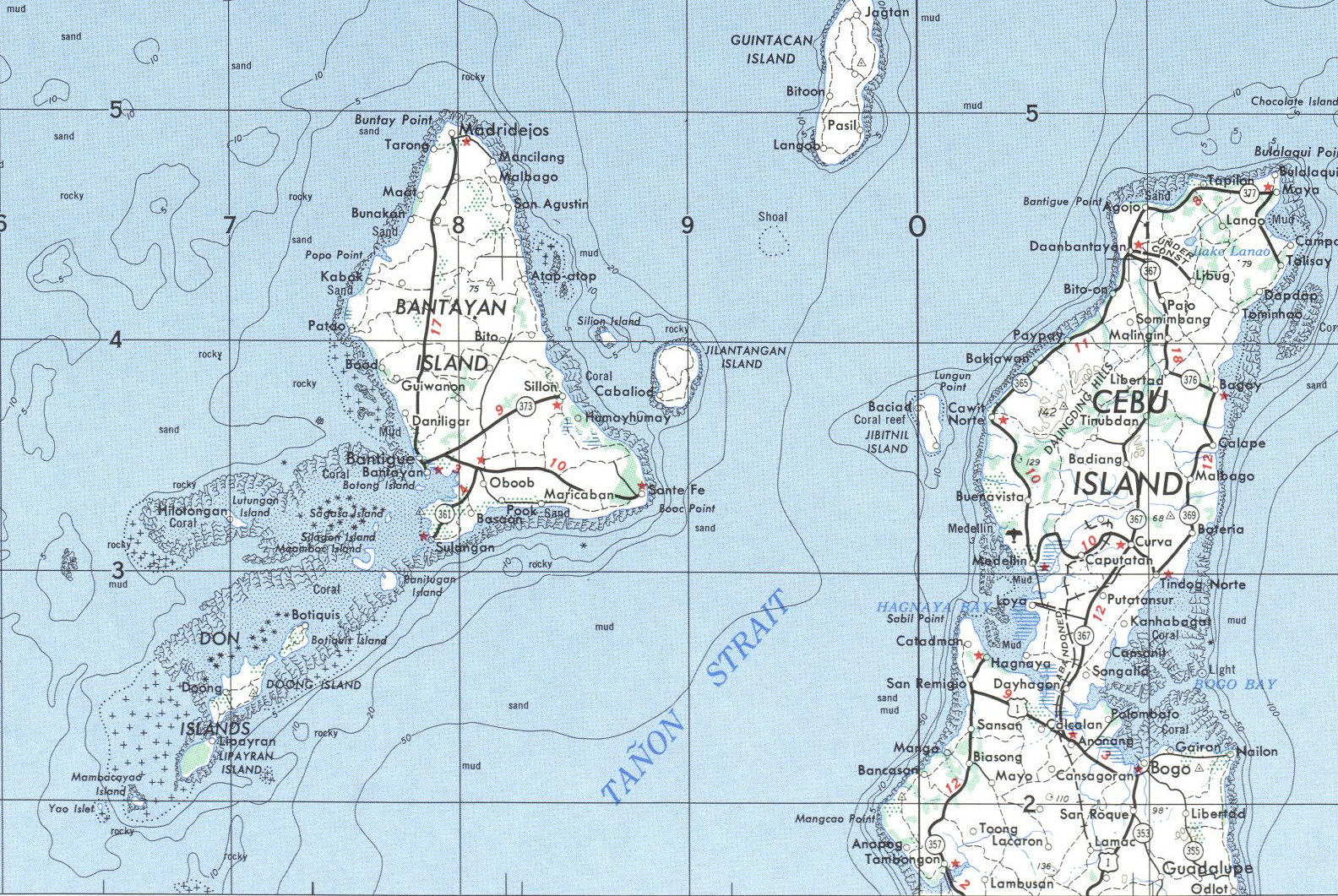
- Location within Bantayan Island
- Coordinates: 11°4′45″N 123°38′45″E

Area
  - Total: 4.32 km^{2} (1.67 sq mi)
- Area estimated from satellite photograph

Population (2010)
  - Total: 2,318
  - Density: 537/km^{2} (1,390/sq mi)

Doong is a small inhabited island in the Don group, to the south west of Bantayan Island in the Philippines. It is part of the municipality of Bantayan, and holds two barangays – Doong and Luyongbaybay.
