= MFJ =

MFJ can mean:

- Modification of Final Judgment, a legal agreement stemming from the 1982 AT&T breakup
- MFJ Enterprises, ham radio manufacturer based in Mississippi, USA
- Measures for Justice, criminal & judicial US non-profit organisation
