= Andell Holdings =

Private investment firm

- Type: Private
- Industry: Private equity, Holding Company, Investment Company
- Founder: Andrew Hauptman
- Headquarters: Los Angeles, United States
- Key people: Andrew Hauptman

Andell Holdings is a private investment firm and one of the nation's leading family offices. Andell invests directly in private and public companies and real estate, acquiring control and minority stakes, as well as with top-tier investment managers. Andell's real estate platform includes a variety of investments across all asset classes and throughout the capital structure. Andell has been helmed by co-founder Andrew Hauptman since its inception in 1998.

== Key holdings ==
=== Chicago Fire Soccer Club ===
From 2007 to 2019, Andell owned Major League Soccer's Chicago Fire Soccer Club, purchasing the Club from AEG in 2007 for $35 million. Under Andell’s ownership, the Club experienced dramatic growth, with the franchise value increasing more than eleven-fold, culminating in a sale at $400 million.

The club was consistently recognized for its deep community engagement, including being awarded ESPN's 2019 Sports Humanitarian Team of the Year Award, the 2017 Corporate Citizen of the Year Award by the Executives' Club of Chicago, the 2016 Beyond Sport Team of the Year, winning over other finalists FC Barcelona, Arsenal FC, the San Francisco Giants, and the Detroit Pistons, and the 2015 Robert Wood Johnson Sport Team of the Year.

Andell’s Chairman, Andrew Hauptman, led a complex and successful multi-year effort to move the team to downtown Chicago and Soldier Field. In September 2019, after securing the relocation of the team downtown, Hauptman sold the Fire to Joe Mansueto, founder of Morningstar, Inc.

=== BSN Sports ===
From 2007 until 2013, Andell was co-owner of BSN Sports (formerly Sports Supply Group), the largest multi-channel direct marketer, manufacturer and distributor of sporting goods, athletic equipment and team sports apparel in the United States. After acquiring an ownership stake in the publicly traded business in 2007, Hauptman brought ONCAP Management Partners (a part of Onex Corporation) to the table, and alongside management, orchestrated a take-private transaction in 2010.

In June 2013, a strategic buyer purchased BSN. Andell realized more than a 4.5x gross multiple of its capital invested, representing a 67.6% gross IRR over the last three-year investment period.

=== Storage Mobility/PODS ===
From 2004 through 2014, Andell founded, owned, and operated Storage Mobility, the largest franchisee of PODS Enterprises, Inc.

Under Hauptman’s tenure as Chairman of the Board, Storage Mobility launched and operated PODS locations in 21 new markets across the United States. In 2014, Hauptman reached an agreement to merge Storage Mobility with PODS which subsequently sold in 2015 to Ontario Teachers for $1 billion.

=== Altas Partners ===
In 2013, Andell backed the launch of Toronto-based Altas Partners, Canada’s largest independent private equity firm, managing more than $9 billion in capital. Hauptman currently serves as an advisor and founding Advisory Board member. Andell has invested alongside Altas in a number of businesses that have been successfully exited, including NSC Minerals (sold to Kissner Group); Medforth Global Healthcare Education (sold to Carlyle Group); and Capital Vision Services/MyEyeDr, representing 165 optometry centers serving 1.8 million patients in seven states. MyEyeDr grew to 575 practices in 18 states and was sold to Goldman Sachs for $2.7 billion. Andell has also invested alongside Altas in many of its current investments, including Hub International, a leading insurance broker; University of St. Augustine, a physical and occupational therapist educator; DuBois Chemicals, a specialty chemical provider; and Unified Women’s Healthcare, the largest ob-gyn physician practice management company in the U.S.

== Real estate ==
Andell's real estate platform includes a variety of investments across all asset classes and throughout the capital structure. In 2013, San Francisco-based Ridge Capital Investors and an affiliate of Andell’s bought a 105-unit LeSarra apartment building for $22.8 million. In 2014, Pacific Capital sold the 136-unit Sierra Ridge apartment building in Roseville, CA to Ridge Capital Investors and an affiliate of Andell’s for $18 million. In 2020, Stos Partners and an affiliate of Andell’s bought a 227,160 SF industrial building in Tolleson, AZ for $16.35 million. In 2022, Ridge Capital Investors and Andell’s acquired a two-property apartment portfolio totaling 444 units in the East Bay section of Northern California. Also in 2022, Stos Partners and an affiliate of Andell’s bought a 35,000 SF industrial building in Signal Hill, CA for $8.4 million.

== Key people ==
Andrew Hauptman is co-founder and chairman of Andell Holdings.

== History ==
Andell Inc. was named after Andrew and Ellen Bronfman Hauptman (daughter of Charles Bronfman), the two principal owners, using the first portions of each of their names (ANDrew and ELLen).
