= State of Play (film) =

2009 film by Kevin Macdonald

- Theatrical release poster
- Directed by: Kevin Macdonald
- Screenplay by: Matthew Michael Carnahan; Tony Gilroy; Billy Ray
- Based on: State of Play by Paul Abbott
- Produced by: Andrew Hauptman; Tim Bevan; Eric Fellner
- Starring: Russell Crowe; Ben Affleck; Rachel McAdams; Robin Wright Penn; Jason Bateman; Jeff Daniels; Helen Mirren
- Cinematography: Rodrigo Prieto
- Edited by: Justine Wright
- Music by: Alex Heffes
- Production companies: Working Title Films; StudioCanal; Relativity Media; Andell Entertainment
- Distributed by: Universal Pictures (International); StudioCanal (France)
- Release dates: April 17, 2009 (United States); April 22, 2009 (United Kingdom)
- Running time: 127 minutes
- Countries: United Kingdom; United States; France
- Language: English
- Budget: $60 million
- Box office: $88.8 million

State of Play is a 2009 political thriller film directed by Kevin Macdonald. It is based on the 2003 British television serial of the same name. The film tells of journalist Cal McAffrey's (Russell Crowe) probe into the suspicious death of the assistant and mistress of Congressman Stephen Collins (Ben Affleck). The supporting cast includes Rachel McAdams, Helen Mirren, Jason Bateman, Robin Wright, and Jeff Daniels.

Macdonald said that State of Play is influenced by the films of the 1970s. He explores the privatization of American Homeland Security and, to a minor extent, journalistic independence, along with the relationship between politicians and the press. Released in North America on April 17, 2009, by Universal Pictures, the film received generally positive reviews from critics and grossed $88 million worldwide.

== Plot ==
In Washington, D.C., a man with a metal briefcase kills fleeing thief Deshaun Stagg. A passing witness is shot and left in a coma. The next morning, Congressional aide Sonia Baker is killed by a Washington Metro train.

Sonia was chief researcher for Congressman Stephen Collins, as the chair of the Congressional committee investigating private defense contractors, including one named PointCorp. Stephen reveals to Cal McAffrey, senior reporter of the Washington Globe newspaper, that he had been having an affair with Sonia and does not believe that she was suicidal.

News blogger Della Frye, Cal's new recruit, reviews the Metro CCTV footage, which proves fruitless. Cal eventually finds Sonia's number in Deshaun's phone. A homeless teenage girl named Mandi seeks out Cal to sell him items from a bag stolen by Deshaun; they had been close friends. These items include covert photographs of Sonia meeting a well-dressed man and a gun with handmade hollow point bullets. While Cal meets up with Stephen's wife, Anne — with whom he had previously had an affair — he sends Della to the hospital, where the witness is coming out of his coma. However, a sniper kills the witness. Della realizes that she saw the killer at the hospital and in the Metro footage.

Stephen confirms that PointCorp is secretly the power behind other contractors, thus seeking a virtual monopoly on foreign and domestic government defense and security contracts worth hundreds of billions of dollars. If Cal can prove that PointCorp had Sonia killed, Stephen will go public with his findings.

A PointCorp insider gives Cal a contact address, where he encounters the assassin, who shoots at him before fleeing. Detective Donald Bell informs Cal that Mandi has been found murdered. Sonia's flatmate, Rhonda Silver, identifies the well-dressed man as Dominic Foy, a PR executive at a subsidiary of PointCorp. Rhonda also says that she had a threesome with Sonia and Stephen and that the latter paid off Sonia's $40,000 of debt. Believing Rhonda to be lying, Cal resists Della's urge to publish.

Cal buttonholes Dominic at a diner and convinces him that he is in danger. His best protection is to make a statement on the record. Dominic reveals that Sonia was being paid $26,000 a month to spy on Stephen for PointCorp, but had fallen in love and had become pregnant with Stephen's child. Sonia was killed when she refused to continue spying. Cal plays the tape of the interview to Stephen, who lashes out at Cal for not telling him in person about the pregnancy. He accuses Cal of caring about his story above their friendship and storms off. That evening, Cal confronts Congressman George Fergus, the majority leader who had mentored Stephen and recommended Sonia to him. Cal reveals that he plans to run a story about Fergus' link with PointCorp and his undermining of Stephen's investigation.

Stephen and Anne later enter the Globe offices. Stephen confirms the story on PointCorp, his affair with Sonia, and his belief that PointCorp had her killed. Anne then tells Cal that Sonia slept with her husband "for $26,000 a month".

As the story goes to press, Cal realizes that the specific sum was never mentioned to Stephen. He recognizes the assassin as "Robert Bingham" in an old military group photograph featuring Stephen. He leaves, telling Della to hold the story. Cal confronts Stephen, who confirms that Bingham is an unstable veteran whose life he had saved in a war (Note: The Kuwait War of 1991.) and whom he asked to follow Sonia, once he became suspicious of her. He says that he never asked him to kill her and initially thought, as did Cal, that PointCorp had done it. Cal says this is not about Fergus or PointCorp, but about decisions Stephen made that resulted in four deaths. Cal reveals that the police are already coming to arrest Stephen.

Leaving the building, Cal is confronted by Bingham. He attempts to kill Cal, but is shot dead by the approaching police. At the Globe, Cal types up the story headlined "Congressman Arrested". He puts Della's name first on the byline and has her submit the story for publication. The two then leave together.

== Cast ==
- Russell Crowe as Cal McAffrey
- Ben Affleck as Rep. Stephen Collins
- Rachel McAdams as Della Frye
- Helen Mirren as Cameron Lynne
- Robin Wright as Anne Collins
- Harry Lennix as Det. Donald Bell
- Jason Bateman as Dominic Foy
- Jeff Daniels as Rep. George Fergus
- Josh Mostel as Pete
- Wendy Makkena as Greer Thornton
- Maria Thayer as Sonia Baker
- Michael Jace as Stuart Brown
- Brennan Brown as Andrew Pell
- Michael Berresse as Robert Bingham
- Michael Weston as Hank
- Viola Davis as Dr. Judith Franklin
- Barry Shabaka Henley as Gene Stavitz
- David Harbour as PointCorp insider
- Zoe Lister-Jones as Jessy
- Katy Mixon as Rhonda Silver
- Sarah Lord as Mandi
- LaDell Preston as DeShaun Stagg

For the movie adaptation, certain names of characters were changed:

- Della's surname was changed from "Smith" to "Frye".
- Cameron's surname was changed from "Foster" to "Lynne," and the character's gender was changed.
- Andrew's surname was changed from "Wilson" to "Pell".
- Det. Bell's first name was changed from "William" to "Donald".

== Production ==
=== Development ===
The television miniseries was written by Paul Abbott and aired on British television channel BBC One in May and June 2003 and on BBC America in April 2004. Abbott was initially reluctant to sell the film rights to State of Play, fearing a compressed version of his miniseries would be unworkable, but in May 2004 he accepted a seven-figure Paramount Pictures-backed bid led by producer Scott Rudin. The bid prevailed over an offer from Andrew Hauptman's Mission Pictures (backed by Warner Bros.), but the deal fell through before completion. After a second bidding war, Mission acquired the rights for Universal Pictures in December 2004.

Director Kevin Macdonald had long been attached to the project; however, an early report suggested screenwriter Matthew Michael Carnahan was set to make the film his directorial debut. Macdonald was a fan of the original miniseries, and said it would be a "hard act to follow".

He said the blend of fiction and the topical subjects of journalism and politics attracted him to the project, adding that he wanted to examine how American and European societies learn what is happening in the world and to what degree newspapers and the nightly news could be trusted. He said that in an age when people read fewer newspapers, he wanted to explore the necessity for reliable information and the threat to the journalistic profession from collusion between reporters and politicians, and that the film would "[ask] questions of how independent the press is, how much real investigating is conducted, and how much is taken on faith from lobbyists or PR sheets." Macdonald cited the films of the 1970s, All the President's Men in particular, as major influences, saying that while he was scared of comparisons with the film account of the Watergate scandal, State of Play would primarily be a piece of entertainment.

According to Carnahan, the story's core issue (and the main factor behind his desire to write the adaptation) was the question it raised about whether a person would be justified in doing "a pretty awful thing" if performing great deeds in other areas of their life. Carnahan began working on revisions to his script with Macdonald, but the process was disrupted when Carnahan's daughter fell ill. When he chose to concentrate his time on his family, the task was handed to screenwriter Tony Gilroy, who performed a small rewrite based upon Carnahan's notes. He is known for the Bourne film series. Further rewrites were carried out by Peter Morgan, screenwriter of The Queen and writer/director Billy Ray, associated with Shattered Glass.

The film was made for Universal Pictures by Working Title Films. Eric Fellner and Tim Bevan produced for Working Title, alongside E. Bennett Walsh, and Andell Entertainment's Andrew Hauptman and Eric Hayes. Paul Abbott served as executive producer alongside Liza Chasin and Debra Hayward. Kristen Lowe and Maradith Frenkel were overseers for the studio. State of Play was to be released in the United States toward the end of 2008, but the delayed start to production saw the date changed to April 17, 2009. State of Play was released in the United Kingdom on April 24, 2009, and was released in Australia on May 28, 2009.

=== Casting ===
I wanted to explore the ambiguity of journalism... It's a kind of conceit that journalists live under, that they remain objective. That's never been my experience. They're all too human, all too emotionally affected. Someone could write absolute rubbish about you because their aunty's having a problem with cancer or something. It's the way they re-balance themselves. So I think examining that conceit and examining the true input of human experience in the journalism that we read, was very interesting for me.

— Russell Crowe on his attraction to the role of Cal McAffrey.

Brad Pitt had a long association with the main role. He was initially attracted to the project after watching Macdonald's documentary Touching the Void (2003), and had enjoyed the director's film The Last King of Scotland (2006). Macdonald had also been working with Pitt's production company Plan B Entertainment on a potential future project.

Pitt officially committed to star in State of Play in August 2007 after a Tony Gilroy script rewrite was completed. He visited the newsroom of The Washington Post with Macdonald in September 2007 to research the role, spending four hours "talking shop" with political and investigative reporters. But one week before filming was to begin in November 2007, he left the production.

Producer Eric Fellner attempted to convince Pitt to remain in the film, but Pitt disagreed with changes that the studio had made to the script since he originally agreed to star. Talent agency CAA (which represents Pitt) maintained that he never signed off on the changes; Macdonald delayed filming by a week to perform a scene-by-scene review of the script with Pitt; by the end, the director told the actor "I don't think we want to make the same film." When Pitt decided to drop out of the film, he called the director to tell him. Pitt preferred a version closer to the original Carnahan draft and wanted to postpone filming until after the resolution of the 2007–2008 Writers Guild of America strike, which would have enabled a further rewrite. The studio preferred to press on with production; initially, it said it intended to sue Pitt for reneging on his "pay or play" deal, which would have earned him $20 million. Settlement talks later led to a thawing of relations between the parties. Pitt later said of the situation: "I had definite beliefs of what [the film] should be, and the director had his definite beliefs [and] we got up against this writers' strike where we couldn't fuse the two."

Macdonald traveled to Australia to court Crowe's involvement, which averted the film's abandonment after Pitt left. Crowe had to negotiate with the studio over shooting dates to avoid a conflict with Nottingham (later renamed Robin Hood), which he was due to star in for director Ridley Scott in March 2008. Crowe said jumping immediately into the part was similar to immediately taking roles as a jobbing young actor. He had not seen the series and was unsure about taking the role, as he could not compare a six-hour telling of the story to a two-hour adaption. The majority of Crowe's three hours per day in hair and makeup preparation was spent hiding his "extremely long" hair, which he grew for his title role in Robin Hood. During filming in Washington, D.C., Crowe acquired an education in journalism from The Washington Post's Metro editor, R.B. Brenner. Universal president of production Donna Langley said Crowe's performance was a naturalistic one, and claimed State of Play was a different film than the one that would have been made had Pitt remained.

British newspaper The Independent noted that hiring an A-list American actor (Pitt) for the lead role was sidelining original McAffrey actor John Simm, who it said was "widely considered one of the best television actors to emerge in recent years" and that the recasting was "the latest example of the trend for British actors to be replaced by Americans". The Stage television writer Liz Thomas said that while it was frustrating for British actors, such casting made good commercial sense, expressing hope that the film's high-profile would be a "huge advert" or "shop window" for other such projects to come out of the UK in recent years.

In a scene shot at the Library of Congress, the production employed several real-world journalists among the extras in a scene in which Wright-Penn's character makes a statement to the press. The group included Bob Woodward, Margaret Carlson, Bob Schieffer, John Palmer, E. J. Dionne, Katty Kay, and Steven Clemons. Additionally featured are cameos by news media commentators Lou Dobbs of CNN and Chris Matthews of MSNBC. Long-time Washington, D.C.-area sportscaster Frank Herzog also has a non-speaking cameo as a congressman present at the PointCorp hearings. Journalist and Clinton confidante Cody Shearer is credited as a consultant on the film. Steve Clemons observed that "Crowe's style, language, posture, everything — just had to be modeled on Cody Shearer."

Affleck replaced Edward Norton, who had joined the project in September 2007, but when the start of production was delayed due to Pitt's departure, Norton had a scheduling conflict, as he was committed to film Leaves of Grass for Tim Blake Nelson early in 2008. Norton asked Universal Pictures if he could be replaced, and a deal was struck between the studio and the Endeavor Talent Agency (which represents Norton and Affleck) to enable Norton to leave the production amicably. Crowe had partly been attracted to the project because of Norton's involvement, but he and Affleck had "so many touchstones in common", he was fine with the recasting. Affleck visited Capitol Hill to research his role, meeting with Speaker Nancy Pelosi, Representative Anthony D. Weiner of New York's 9th congressional district, and members of the Massachusetts congressional delegation. In an April 2009 interview to promote the film, Affleck said he drew on the experiences of Gary Condit, Eliot Spitzer, and John Edwards while preparing for the role.

=== Filming ===
Principal photography took place between January 11, 2008, and April 6, 2008. Filming was originally scheduled to start in November 2007, but was postponed due to Brad Pitt's unexpected departure from the production. Eric Fellner indicated that the film was close to being abandoned and credited Universal's chairman and co-chairman (Marc Shmuger and David Linde) with seeing the film to production.

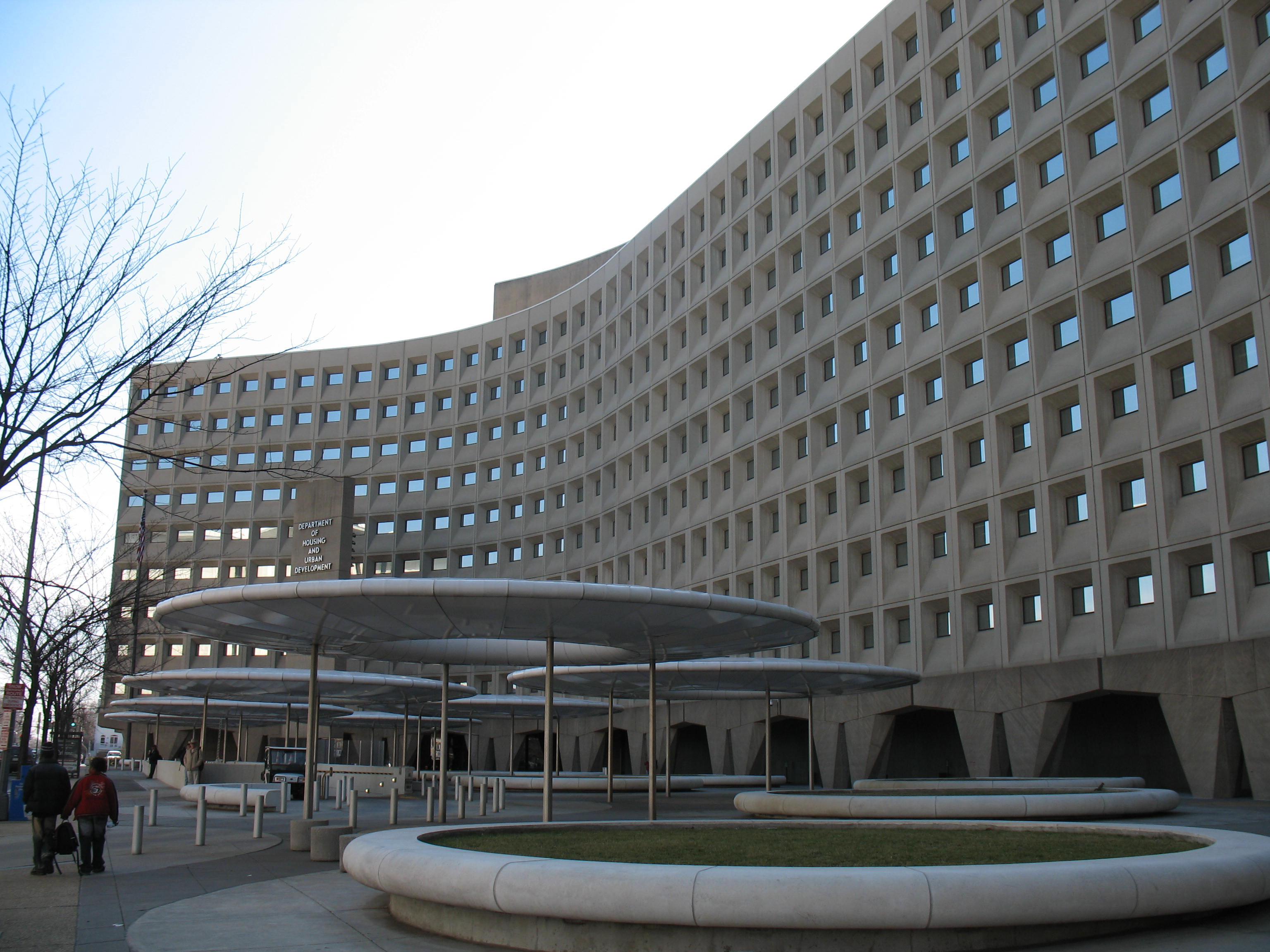
The exterior of the Department of Housing and Urban Development building in Washington, D.C. doubled as a hospital entrance.

The first eight weeks of filming took place in Los Angeles, which accounted for the majority of the shooting schedule. A newsroom set was built to be the fictional Washington Globe newspaper operations hub. Costume designer Jacqueline West indicated that she looked to the newsroom of The Washington Post for inspiration and used photos of The Baltimore Sun's newsroom to help her develop the journalists' looks.

The production moved to Washington, D.C., for five weeks of location filming toward the end of the shoot, commencing on March 6, 2008. More than a third of State of Play was shot in Washington, D.C., with filming taking place throughout the city. The filmmakers estimated that State of Play may have set a record for the longest studio shoot in the city. Locations included the neighborhoods of Adams Morgan, Shaw, and Mount Pleasant. Scenes set on Mount Pleasant Street were also filmed at the Los Angeles studio, where a full replica of the strip's facade was built. In Georgetown, menswear store The District Line was transformed into household goods store for the shooting of a chase scene for the film's opening sequence.

Filming took place on various streets in Washington, D.C., including the U Street Corridor, and at "practically every major landmark", including outside the headquarters of the World Bank on Pennsylvania Avenue, around Capitol Hill, at the Supreme Court building, outside the Library of Congress, and at the Washington Monument. Other locations included landmark restaurant Ben's Chili Bowl, where restaurant workers were employed as extras, and the Maine Avenue Fish Market. The Americana Hotel in Crystal City was also used for the scenes in which McAffrey interrogates Dominic Foy. The exterior of the Department of Housing and Urban Development building was used to double as a hospital entrance. In preparation for filming, eighteen two-foot by three-foot photographs of Secretary Alphonso Jackson were removed from the entrance. The production's "working week" was Wednesday to Sunday, because several of the government buildings featured could not be used for filming during regular work days. The Harbour Square Owners Cooperative complex was used as the home of Affleck's character.

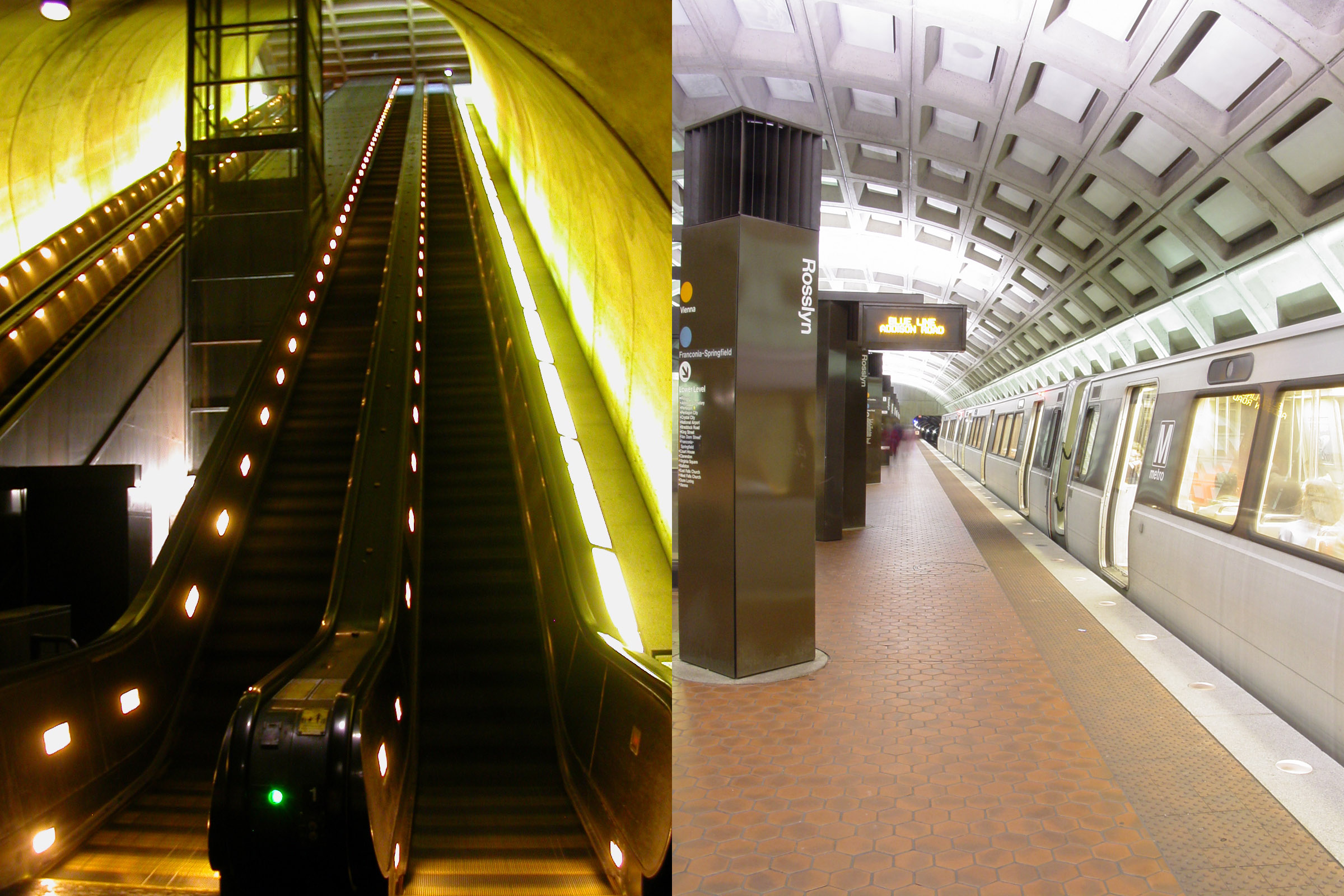
The Rosslyn Metro station is the setting for a scene in which a character is struck by a train. The filmmakers chose the station for its long escalator that leads directly onto a platform.

A pivotal scene in which a character is struck by a train occurs on the Washington Metro. Filming for the scene took place at the Rosslyn Metro station in Virginia. The Rosslyn station was chosen because it was the only station in the Metro system with a long escalator leading to a platform, with trains passing simultaneously on upper and lower levels. Filming also took place at night aboard two railcars at the Forest Glen Metro station in Maryland.

Permission to film at the stations was granted after the script was vetted by the Metro's media relations office, which is notoriously discriminating about which productions it allows to film on the Metro. After the deaths of three Metro employees in 2006, the office was reluctant to allow filming of the scene, but because the script did not explicitly show a death, the office assented. Scenes on the Metro had to meet strict standards for logistics and safety. The portrayal of anything illegal in the system was not allowed, nor was showing characters eating, drinking, jumping over fare gates, or running on the tracks. The production also had to agree to film scenes at the busy Rosslyn station when the system was least busy: late at night and after rush hour. Producer E. Bennett Walsh said that the production chose not to shoot on the less restrictive Baltimore subway, which has substituted for Washington, D.C., in other films that have come up against the Metro's rules. He said, "To shoot any other subway, you would know you're not in Washington."

Scenes were filmed at the Watergate complex, for which the production was granted permission to use the roof of a George Washington University campus building. Scenes were also filmed in the morgue of the St. Mary Medical Center in Long Beach, California. Washington, D.C. police officer Quintin Peterson was employed as a consultant on the film. Peterson, who has acted as a script consultant and technical adviser on numerous productions in the city, helped the production to depict the city's police force accurately.

Filming took place on the steps of the Scottish Rite Freemasonry temple in Washington, D.C.. Maryland's Montgomery Blair High School provided a marching band for the background. They were joined by players from the school's production of the Beauty and the Beast musical and students from Paint Branch High School's Winter guard to act as color guard for the scene. Macdonald aimed to recreate a famous 1970s Canadian photograph, which depicts rifle-twirling majorettes, to emphasize militaristic themes and to comment upon the place of guns in American society. The aesthetic also appealed to Macdonald: "It's just very colorful and beautiful and very American—like a piece of anthropology in America."

The majority of filming over the last three weeks of the shoot took place at night. Filming for these scenes usually began at 5:00 p.m. and finished at 5:00 a.m. A scene filmed under the Key Bridge in Georgetown on April 6, 2008, was the last of principal photography.

=== Visual effects ===
Director of photography Rodrigo Prieto indicated that the film was shot in two distinct visual styles: scenes featuring the media were shot in the anamorphic format on 35mm film, while scenes focusing on the world of politics were shot in high-definition video with the Panavision Genesis digital video camera. Hand-held cameras have been used. For color management, Prieto employed Gamma & Density Company's 3cP color management and correction software, using the American Society of Cinematographers' Color Decision List to keep color consistent throughout shooting, dailies, post and digital intermediate finishing process. The visual effects were handled by Rhythm & Hues Studios (R&H).

=== Music ===
The film score is written by Alex Heffes, who previously worked with MacDonald in the documentaries One Day in September (1999), Touching the Void (2003) and The Last King of Scotland (2007) and produced by Grammy Award-winning record producer Flood (aka Mark Ellis).

== Release ==
State of Play was released in the US on April 17, 2009, and in the UK on April 22, 2009, by Universal Pictures.

== Reception ==
=== Box office ===
State of Play has grossed $37 million domestically, and $50 million in other territories, for a worldwide total of $88 million.

=== Critical response ===
On review aggregator Rotten Tomatoes, State of Play holds an approval rating of 84% based on 213 reviews, with an average rating of 7/10. The site's critical consensus reads: "A taut, well-acted political thriller, State of Play overcomes some unsubtle plot twists with an intelligent script and swift direction." Metacritic, another review aggregator, assigned the film a weighted average score of 64 out of 100 based on 36 critics, indicating "generally favorable reviews". Audiences polled by CinemaScore gave the film an average grade of "A−" on an A+ to F scale.

Philip Kemp from Total Film called it "a twisty substantial thriller" and said, "It's not as exceptional as its source but the changes implemented mostly enhance rather than harm the story." Roger Ebert of the Chicago Sun Times described the film as "a smart ingenious thriller", and he went on to say, "There are many other surprises in the film, which genuinely fooled me a couple of times, and maintains a certain degree of credibility for a thriller".
