= Morningstar DBRS =

Global credit rating agency

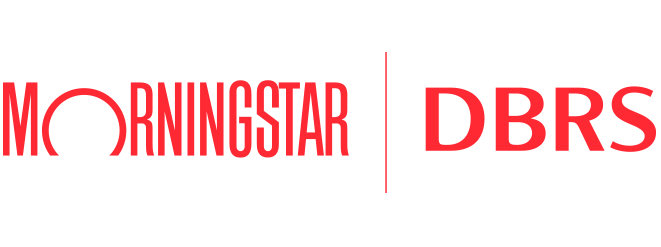
- Company type: Subsidiary
- Industry: Credit rating; Financial services
- Predecessor: DBRS, Dominion Bond Rating Service
- Founded: 1976; 50 years ago
- Founder: Walter Schroeder
- Products: Credit ratings; Financial research
- Parent: Morningstar, Inc.
- Divisions: DBRS Limited; DBRS, Inc.; DBRS Ratings Limited; DBRS Ratings GmbH; DBRS Ratings GmbH; Sucursal en España
- Website: dbrs.morningstar.com

Morningstar DBRS is a global credit rating agency with offices in Toronto, New York, Chicago, London, Frankfurt and Madrid. Morningstar DBRS provides independent credit rating services for financial institutions, corporate and sovereign entities and structured finance products and instruments. It was originally founded as Dominion Bond Rating Service in Toronto in 1976, and its operations were integrated with Morningstar Credit Ratings to form Morningstar DBRS after its acquisition by the global financial services firm Morningstar, Inc. in 2019. It is the largest rating agency in Canada.

Morningstar DBRS is the fourth-largest credit rating agency by global market share, with between 2% and 3% of global market share. The company is one of only four CRAs, including Standard & Poor's, Moody's Investors Service, and Fitch Ratings, to be recognized as an external credit assessment institution by the European Central Bank (ECB). In recent years, Morningstar DBRS' sovereign ratings on European nations, including Portugal, Ireland and Italy, were used by the ECB for such purposes.

== History ==
The company was founded by Walter Schroeder, who started the company in a small office in Toronto with less than $1,000. Schroeder and his family later sold the company to The Carlyle Group and Warburg Pincus.

DBRS opened offices in Chicago and New York in 2003. After changing its name from Dominion Bond Rating Service to DBRS in 2008, the organization opened its current office in London in 2010, an office in Frankfurt in 2018, and an office in Madrid in 2019.

On May 29, 2019, Morningstar, Inc. announced their acquisition of DBRS in an approximately $700 million cash and stock transaction. The takeover closed on July 2, 2019.

== Corporate structure and regulation ==
DBRS Limited is the operating company in Canada. DBRS, Inc. is the operating company in the United States. DBRS Ratings Limited is the operating entity based in London and is home to the agency's broader European operations. DBRS Ratings GmbH is the German operating unit and DBRS Ratings GmbH, Sucursal en España is the operating company in Spain.

In Canada, Morningstar DBRS is regulated through the Canadian Securities Administrators and its principal regulator is the OSC. In the United States, Morningstar DBRS is regulated by the Securities and Exchange Commission. In Europe, Morningstar DBRS is regulated by ESMA and the FCA.
