= Bantayan, Cebu =

Municipality in Cebu, Philippines

Bantayan
- Municipality
- Municipality of Bantayan
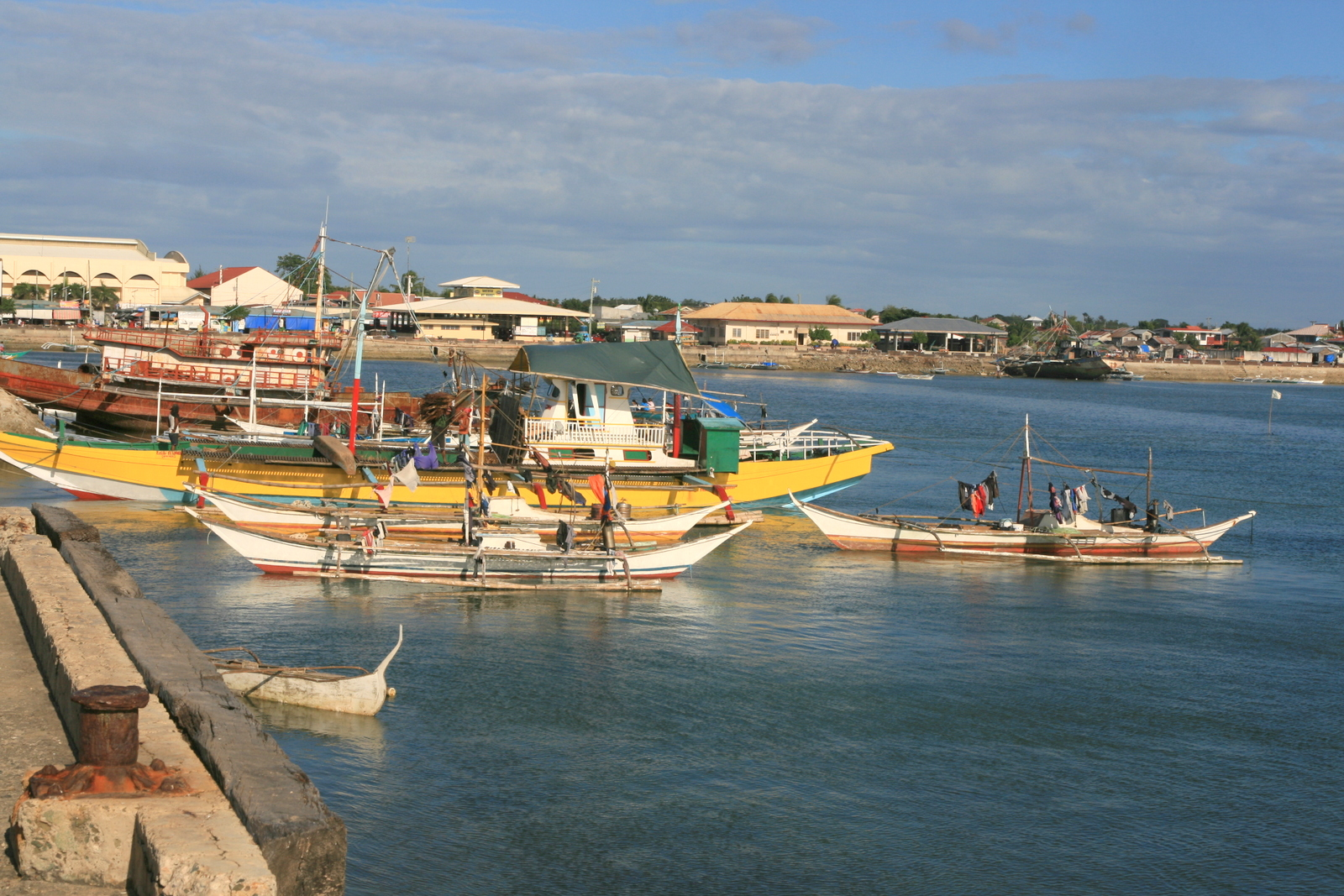
- Bantayan municipality from far end of quay

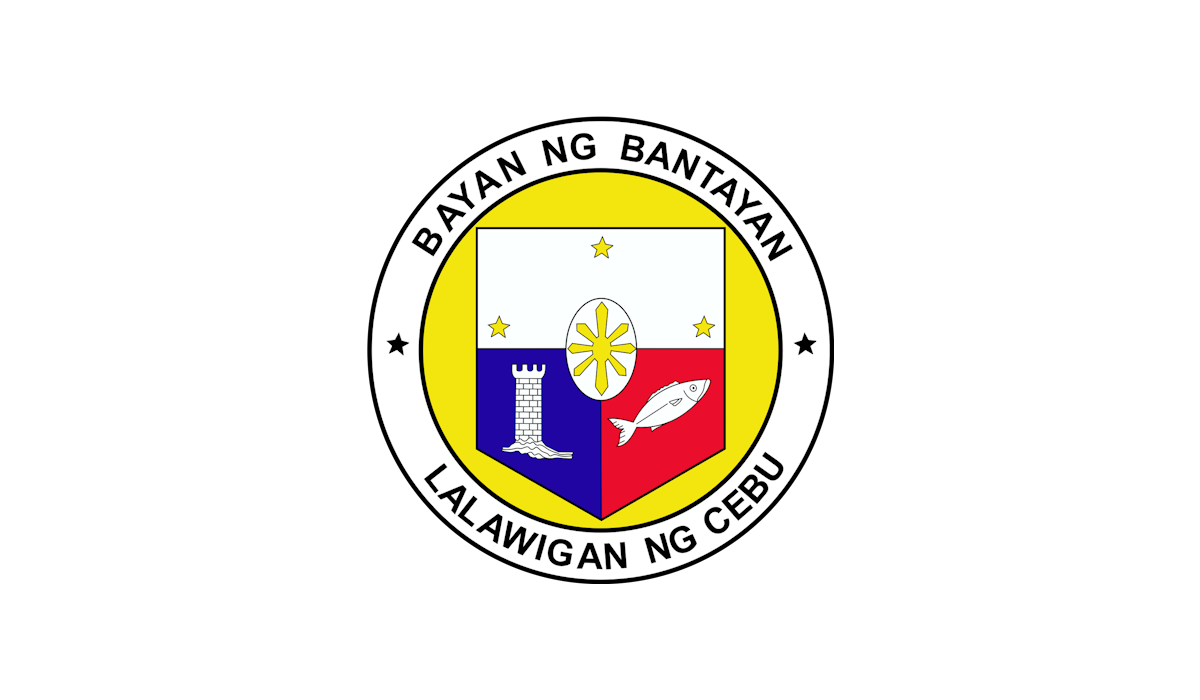
- Flag Seal
- Nickname: Egg Basket of the Visayas
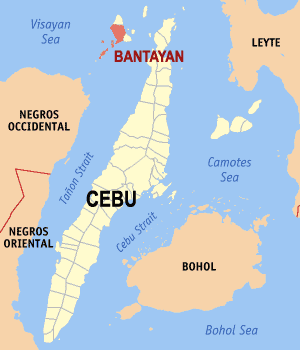
- Map of Cebu with Bantayan highlighted
- Interactive map of Bantayan
- Location within the Philippines
- Coordinates: 11°12′N 123°44′E
- Country: Philippines
- Region: Central Visayas
- Province: Cebu
- District: 4th district
- Barangays: 25 (see Barangays)

Government
  - Type: Sangguniang Bayan
  - Mayor: Orlando "Alex" F. Layese (Ind)
  - Vice Mayor: Arthur E. Despi (1Cebu)
  - Representative: Sun J. Shimura (PMP)
  - Municipal Council: Members: Edwin D. Deldig; Juvel M. Ducay; Edgardo F. Layese; Miguel Angelo O. Pacheco; Dino N. Montemar; Jedleonil C. Umbao; Jeffrey Q. Barretto; Paolo Anecito L. Despi
  - Electorate: 49,851 voters (2025)

Area
  - Total: 81.68 km^{2} (31.54 sq mi)
- includes outlying islands
- Elevation: 8.0 m (26.2 ft)

Population (2024 census)
  - Total: 87,394
  - Density: 1,070/km^{2} (2,771/sq mi)
  - Households: 19,493

Economy
  - Income class: 1st municipal income class
  - Poverty incidence: 28.46% (2023)
  - Revenue: ₱ 428.1 million (2024)
  - Assets: ₱ 781.7 million (2024)
  - Expenditure: ₱ 288.7 million (2024)
  - Liabilities: ₱ 176.9 million (2024)

Service provider
  - Electricity: Bantayan Island Electric Cooperative (BANELCO)
- Time zone: UTC+8 (PST)
- ZIP code: 6052
- PSGC: 072209000
- IDD : area code: +63 (0)32
- Native languages: Bantayanon; Cebuano; Tagalog

Bantayan, officially the Municipality of Bantayan (Cebuano: Lungsod sa Bantayan; Tagalog: Bayan ng Bantayan), is a municipality in the province of Cebu, Philippines. According to the 2024 census, it has a population of 87,394 people, making it the island's most populous town as well as the largest.

== Geography ==
Bantayan is located on Bantayan Island, 136 kilometres (85 miles) from Cebu City.

It is bordered to the north by the town of Madridejos, to the southwest is the Tañon Strait, to the east is the town of Medellin and to the south is the town of Santa Fe.

=== Barangays ===
Bantayan is politically subdivided into 25 barangays. Each barangay consists of puroks and some have sitios.

PSGC	Barangay	Population			±% p.a.	
		2024		2010		
072209001	Atop-atop	3.6%	3,187	2,718	▴	1.10%
072209002	Baigad	1.8%	1,550	1,415	▴	0.63%
072209024	Bantigue (Poblacion)	6.0%	5,232	4,703	▴	0.74%
072209003	Baod	3.5%	3,039	3,209	▾	−0.37%
072209004	Binaobao (Poblacion)	3.4%	2,957	2,919	▴	0.09%
072209005	Botigues	3.2%	2,773	2,704	▴	0.17%
072209007	Doong	2.9%	2,531	2,318	▴	0.61%
072209009	Guiwanon	2.9%	2,532	2,546	▾	−0.04%
072209008	Hilotongan	2.9%	2,506	2,060	▴	1.36%
072209006	Kabac	5.1%	4,460	4,164	▴	0.47%
072209010	Kabangbang	2.7%	2,345	2,343	▴	0.01%
072209011	Kampingganon	1.1%	1,000	1,007	▾	−0.05%
072209012	Kangkaibe	2.7%	2,348	2,635	▾	−0.79%
072209013	Lipayran	4.0%	3,502	3,067	▴	0.92%
072209014	Luyongbaybay	1.6%	1,423	1,456	▾	−0.16%
072209015	Mojon	3.1%	2,731	1,704	▴	3.30%
072209016	Obo‑ob	2.4%	2,086	1,893	▴	0.67%
072209017	Patao	6.6%	5,772	5,475	▴	0.36%
072209018	Putian	2.1%	1,809	1,865	▾	−0.21%
072209019	Sillon	4.8%	4,203	4,064	▴	0.23%
072209021	Suba (Poblacion)	4.4%	3,859	3,960	▾	−0.18%
072209022	Sulangan	5.6%	4,925	4,596	▴	0.48%
072209020	Sungko	3.8%	3,312	3,296	▴	0.03%
072209023	Tamiao	2.4%	2,106	1,979	▴	0.43%
072209025	Ticad (Poblacion)	7.9%	6,896	6,689	▴	0.21%
	Total		87,394	74,785	▴	1.08%
Notes	Lipayran	with Mambacayao Daku & Mambacayao Diot				
Notes	Patao	with Polopolo				
Notes	Sulangan	with Biayagayag Daku, Biayagayag Diot, Moamboc, Panitugan, Silagon and Sagasa				
Notes	Suba	with Botong, Panangatan				

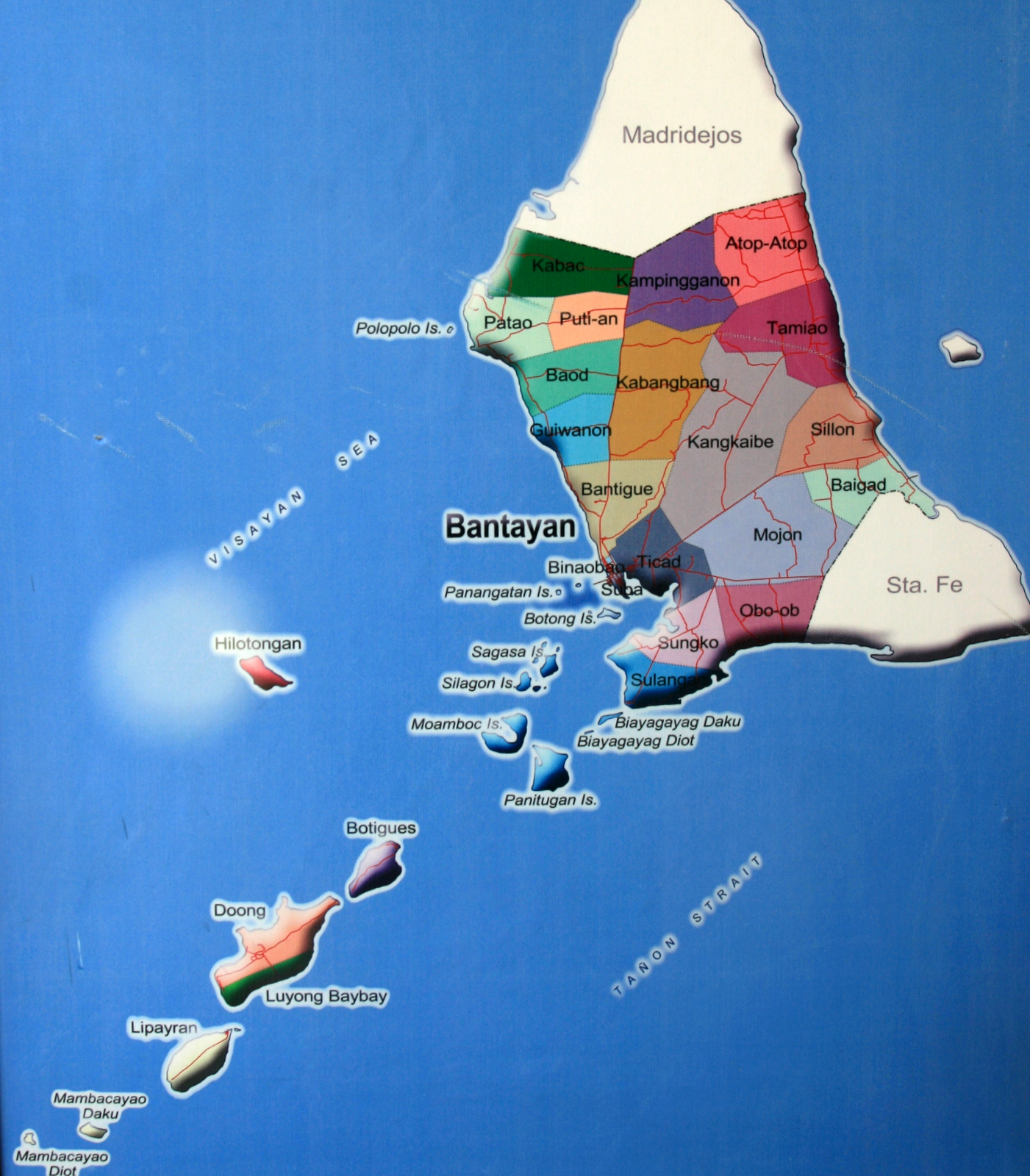
Map showing barangays and islands

=== GK Village ===
Gawad Kalinga has a village in Barangay Mojon.

=== Climate ===
Climate data for Bantayan, Cebu
Month	Jan	Feb	Mar	Apr	May	Jun	Jul	Aug	Sep	Oct	Nov	Dec	Year
Mean daily maximum °C (°F)	29 (84)	29 (84)	31 (88)	32 (90)	32 (90)	31 (88)	30 (86)	30 (86)	30 (86)	30 (86)	29 (84)	29 (84)	30 (86)
Mean daily minimum °C (°F)	23 (73)	22 (72)	23 (73)	23 (73)	25 (77)	25 (77)	24 (75)	25 (77)	24 (75)	24 (75)	24 (75)	23 (73)	24 (75)
Average precipitation mm (inches)	39 (1.5)	34 (1.3)	42 (1.7)	36 (1.4)	73 (2.9)	109 (4.3)	118 (4.6)	108 (4.3)	129 (5.1)	136 (5.4)	112 (4.4)	89 (3.5)	1,025 (40.4)
Average rainy days	12.6	9.7	12.0	13.0	20.5	25.3	26.2	24.8	25.2	25.9	21.9	17.9	235
Source: Meteoblue

== Demographics ==
Population census of Bantayan

Year	Pop.	±% p.a.
1903	13,324	—
1918	14,812	+0.71%
1939	18,805	+1.14%
1948	25,351	+3.37%
1960	30,623	+1.59%
1970	40,017	+2.71%

Year	Pop.	±% p.a.
1975	43,899	+1.87%
1980	47,711	+1.68%
1990	60,000	+2.32%
1995	62,260	+0.70%
2000	68,125	+1.95%
2007	71,655	+0.70%

Year	Pop.	±% p.a.
2010	74,785	+1.57%
2015	79,084	+1.07%
2020	86,247	+1.84%
2024	87,394	+0.32%

Source: Philippine Statistics Authority

== Religion ==
Nearly all of Bantayan's population is Roman Catholic. There is also a small Muslim community. In late 2018, around 215 people converted to Islam in a mission initiated by the UK-based Islamic Education & Research Academy (IERA).

== Economy ==
Poverty incidence of Bantayan (%)

Source: Philippine Statistics Authority

== Transportation ==
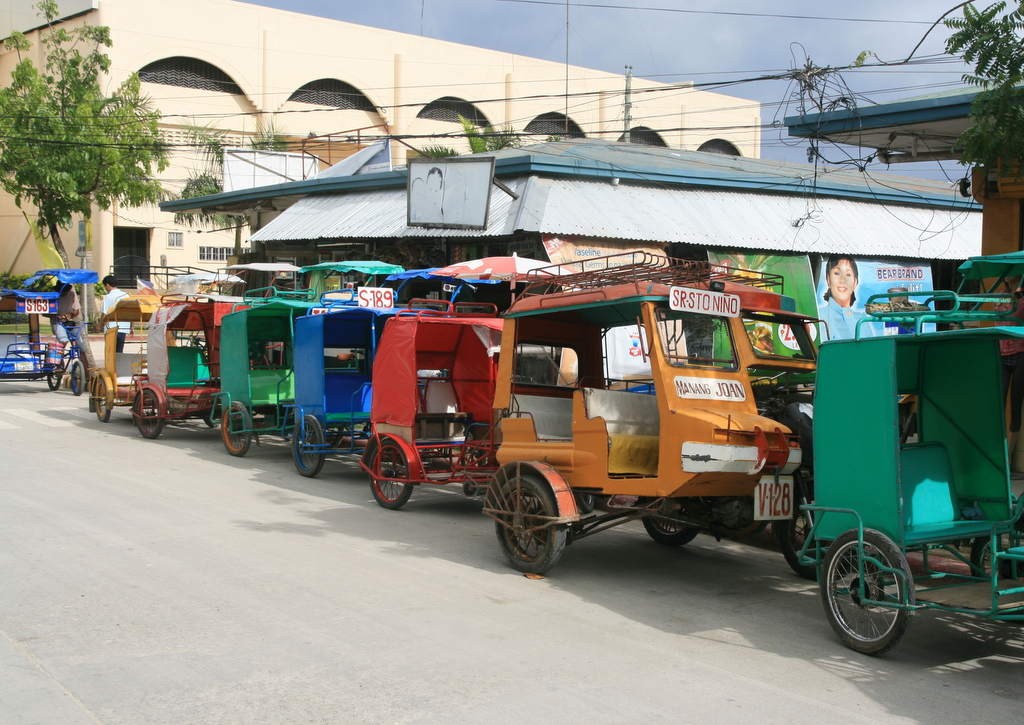
Trisikads (and one tricycle) for hire lined up outside public market in downtown Bantayan

For short journeys within population centres, then trisikads are readily available. They can carry two or three adults plus goods, a total load in excess of 250 kg (550 lb). They are available only where land is flat and level.

For longer journeys, such as from the municipal centre to outlying barangays, then motor tricycles are available. Smaller ones are motorcycle-sidecar combinations, and can carry about 4 passengers. Larger ones, known as multis, have some sort of saloon behind the driver, and are usually shared between as many as eight passengers, plus some goods stowage.

For the longest journeys, such as from Santa Fe ferry pier into downtown Bantayan and onwards, there are larger jeepneys, which can carry around 20 passengers with rooftop goods stowage.

There is no public bus service as such.

== Heritage ==
There are a few historically notable buildings but they have generally not been well maintained, and the ravages of the climate hasten decay, together with several major fires, which consume the wooden structures. Preventive maintenance generally was not practiced, so even the best preserved buildings date back only to the middle of the 19th century.

=== Parish church of Sts. Peter and Paul ===
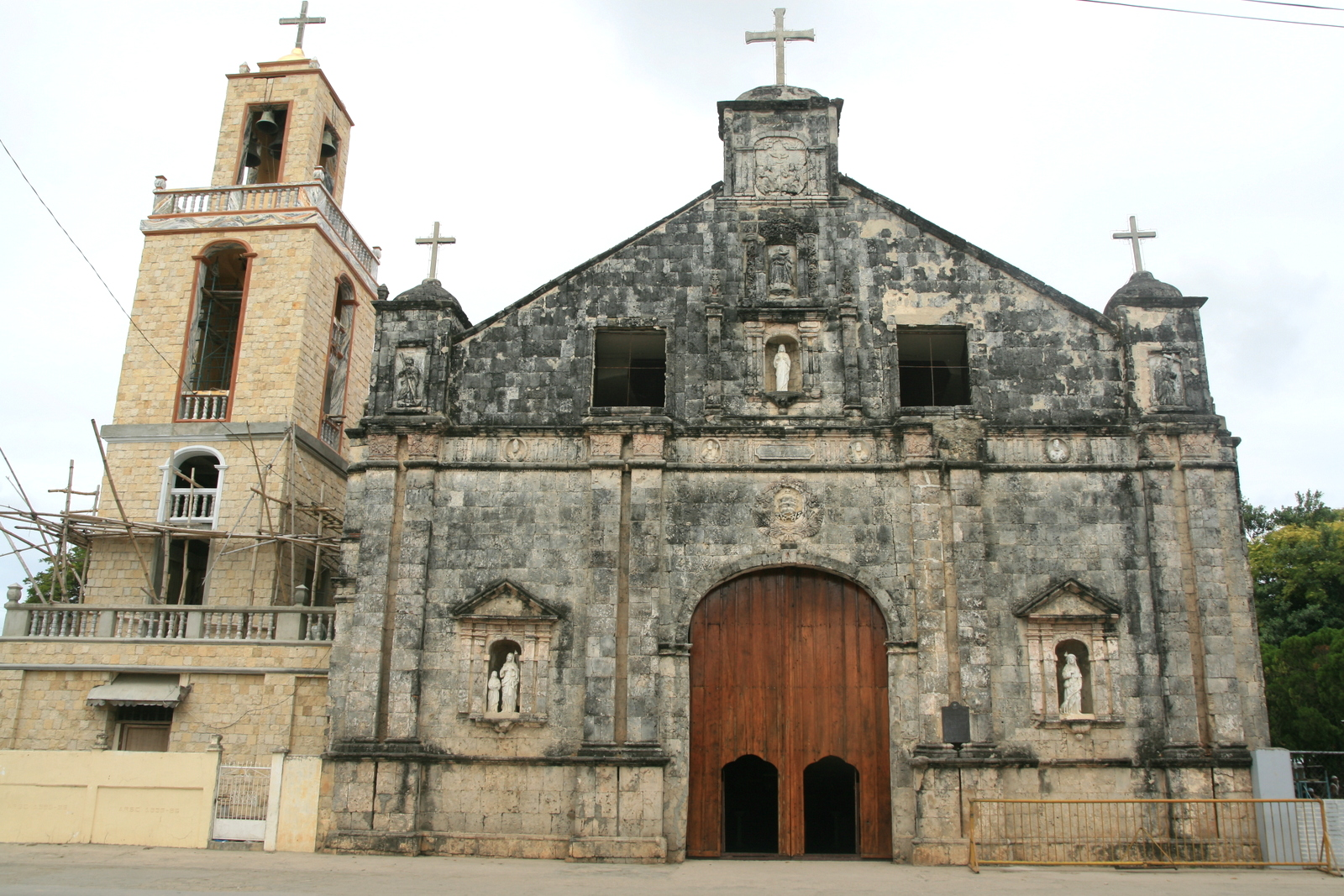
Sts. Peter & Paul front exterior with belfry

The main church stands on the principal plaza. Since the arrival of the Spanish there have been several buildings on its site: originally it was little more than a bamboo and nipa structure, which was burned down during one of the Moro raids. This was replaced by another wooden structure, which also burned down. Construction of the present building (the fifth on the site) started in 1839. The main driving force was the parish priest Padre Doroteo Andrade del Rosario and the maestro de obras (master of works) was his nephew Manuel Rubio y del Rosario (also known as Kapitan Tawi). Construction lasted about 24 years. The principal building material is coral, sawn to approximately parallelepiped shape and dressed like stone.

Since mid–2012 refurbishment work has been in progress: the belfry has been restored to its former glory, and as at February 2013 there are plans to open it for tourist access. The stairs are very steep and not very well guarded, however it does offer an elevated panoramic view of the waterfront.

The church also houses a small museum, visiting by appointment.

=== D.C. Abello theater ===
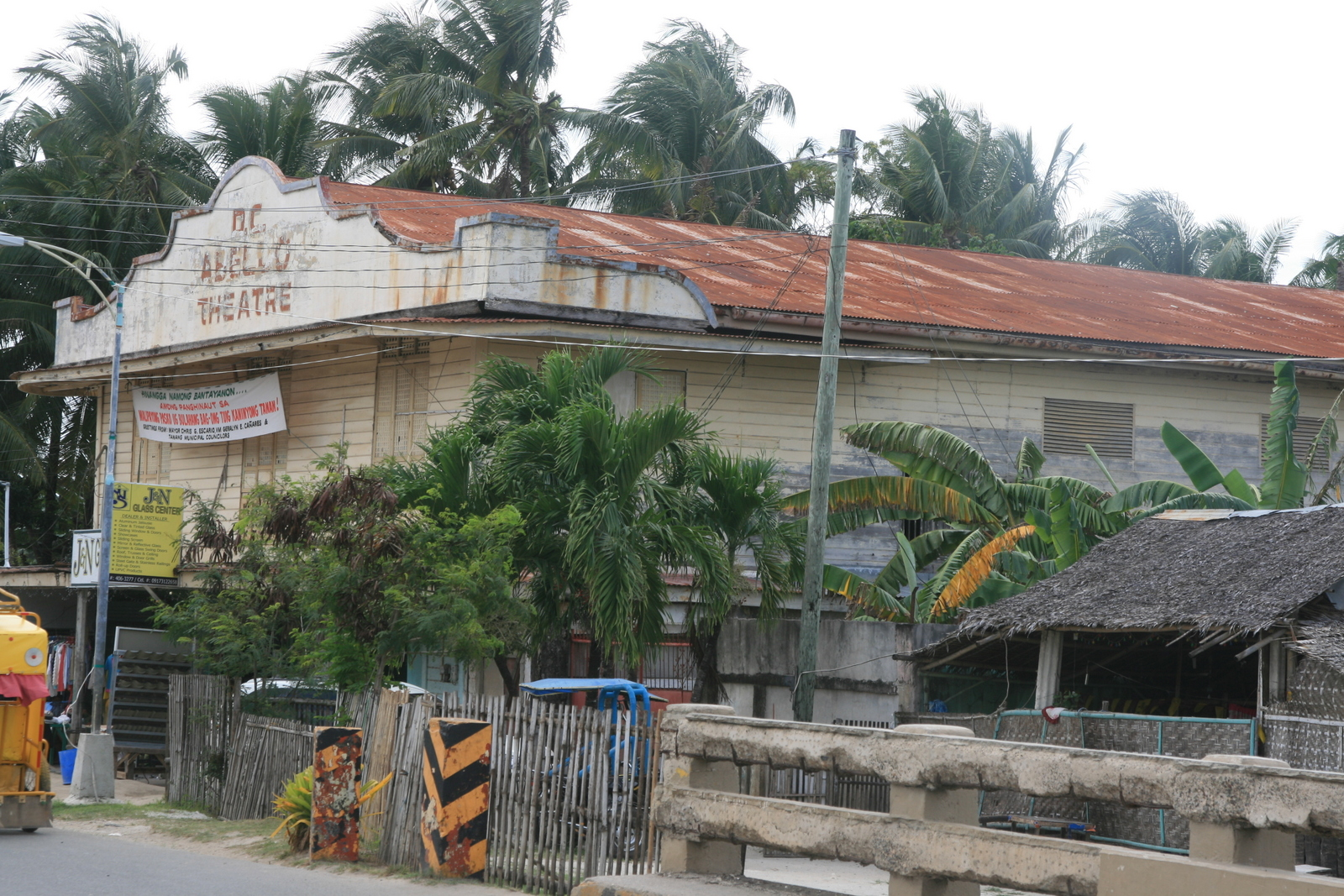
DC Abello movie theater

The D.C. Abello Theater was a Love Offering of Diego Abello and Candelaria Abello y Causing, parents of the Mayor Remedios Abello Escario. Construction of the theater started in 1948 and was completed in 1952. It took four years before the theater could be fully operation as they had to source out a suitable projector and a quality screen that showed images clearly. Diego and Candelaria Abello built this theater to provide entertainment to the people of Bantayan. The building's architectural style harks back to the American period. The D.C. Abello Theater used to show double films and was the favorite rendezvous site of many young romantic Bantayanons at the time. Bantayanons from the neighboring islets and island barangays would flock to this theater especially when a Fernando Poe Jr film was showing. The theater was closed in the early 1980s with the advent of Betamax and, later the DVD era.

— Heritage building sign

As at February 2013 it is some sort of warehouse for glass and windows.

The building was entirely demolished in early 2015 to make way for the island's first supermarket development.

=== Houses ===
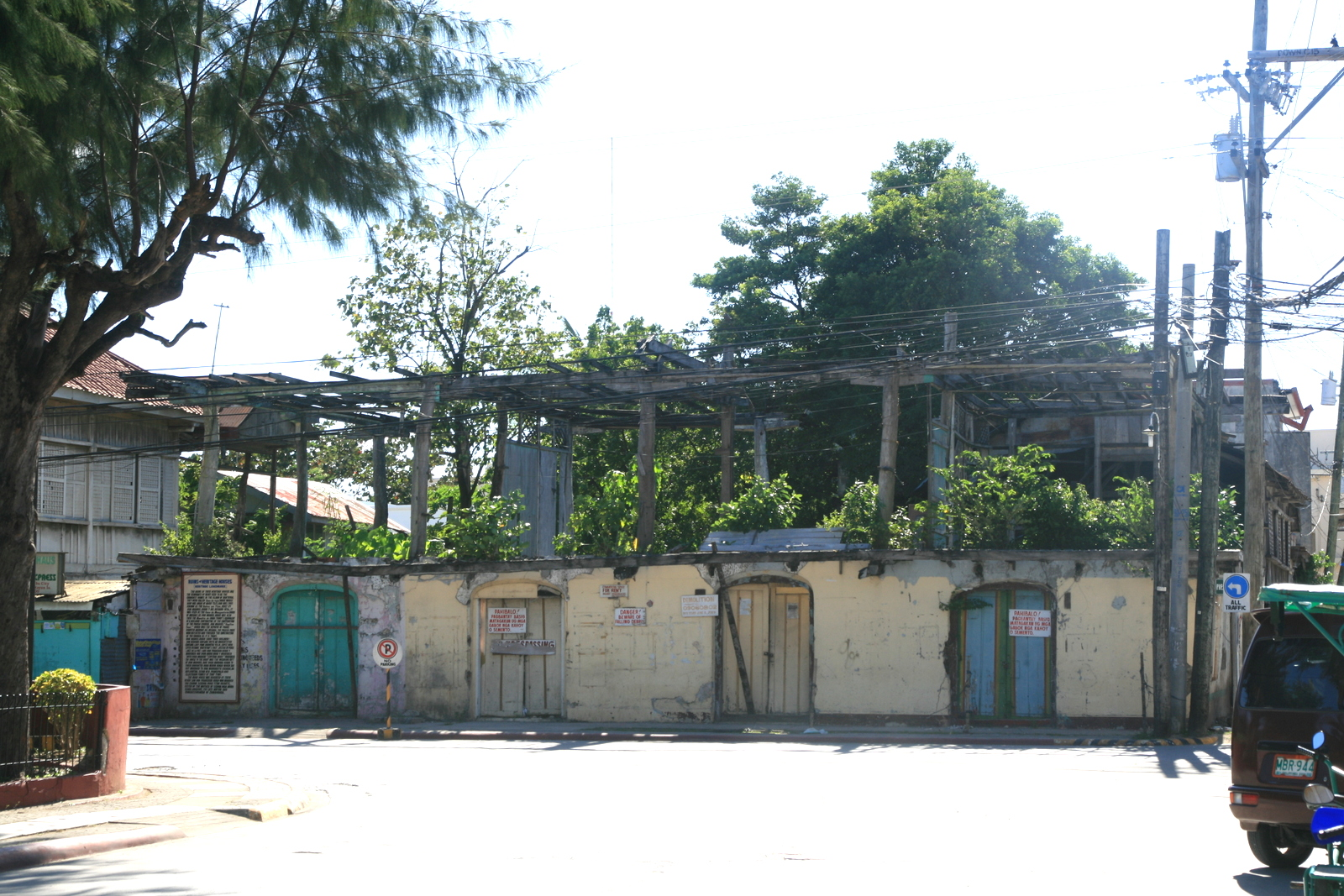
Derelict once-grand homes on Bantayan island

Central plaza was the location of several well-built houses. Opposite the church Manuel del Rosario built two which used to be "the grandest homes on Bantayan island". Originally pre-dating the church, one was used as the Casa de Mamposteria (house of masons) during construction of the church. The main house was later inherited by the son of del Rosario and his second wife, while the house next door was their wedding gift to their daughter.

After subsequent bequests, ownership of both houses was shared by many scions of the Causing and Escario families. They were unable to decide on (or maybe fund) any necessary preventive maintenance work. As at February 2013 both houses have more or less collapsed in ruins past repair. All that remains of Bantayan's former glory is a dangerous and collection of rotten beams, collapsed walls and broken tiles occupying a prime and valuable location. Typhoon Yolanda subsequently caused both ruins to collapse entirely.

== Recreation ==
There are no longer any public entertainment centres such as cinemas. Apart from religious fiestas and processions, a common form of enjoyment for Bantayanons is karaoke (known as videoke). Many households have their own equipment, but for special occasions they hire equipment with high output, especially with low frequency sound. This is often placed in the street, for the enjoyment of the neighbourhood.

=== Beach ===
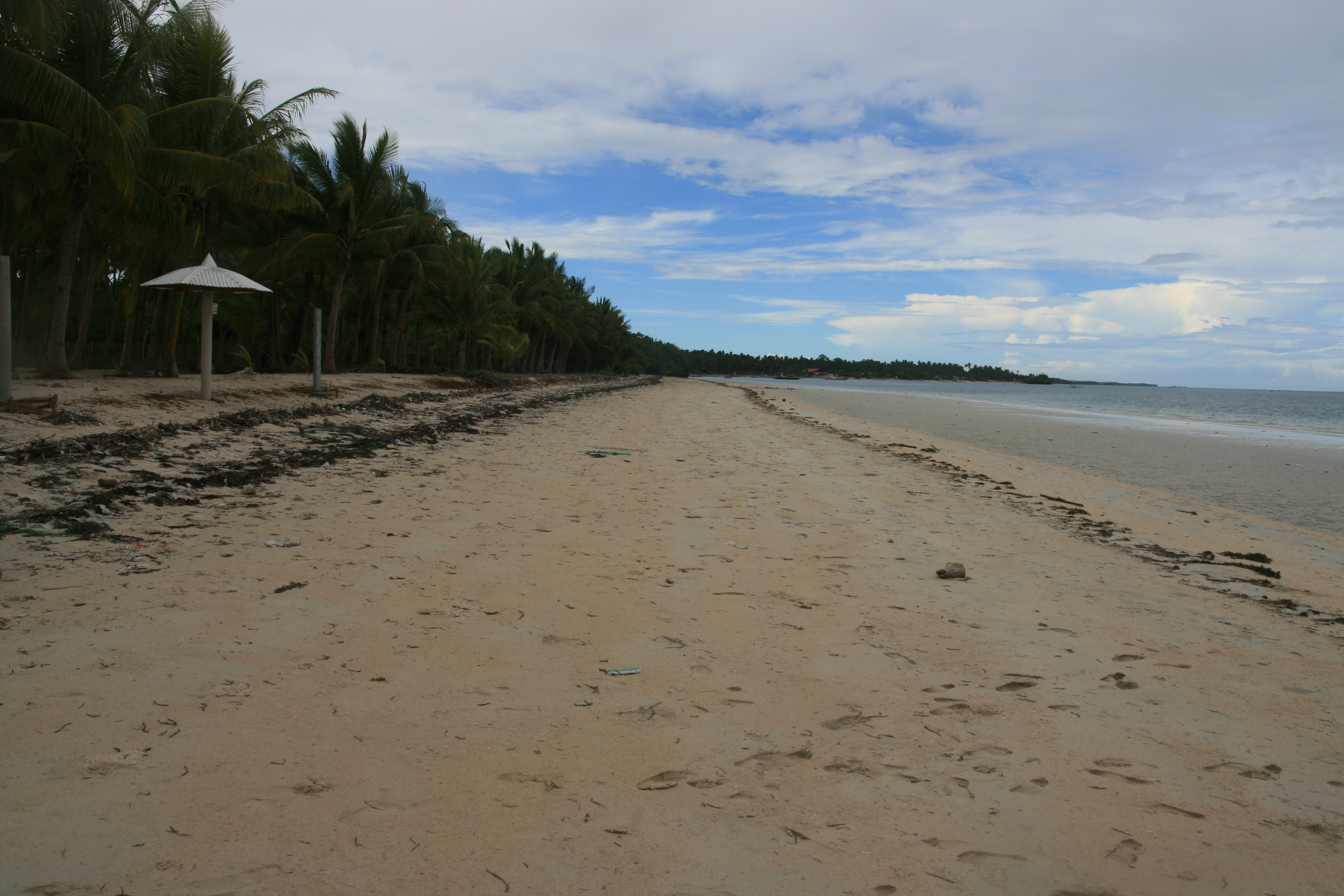
Empty beach, empty sea at Baigad

Much of the municipality coastline is unsuitable as a beach - there is no real sandy area, mostly rocks or mud, all along the southern coast of the municipality, and the western coast almost as far north as Baod and Patao. There are better beaches on the eastern coast, but access is difficult.

Sillon and Baigad is where beaches can be found. However these too have plenty of detritus and flotsam – for the most part seaweed and vegetation from the coconut palms which line the shore. The beaches are almost completely undeveloped, so no facilities, and there are several large private properties which are built close to the shore line.

=== Attractions ===
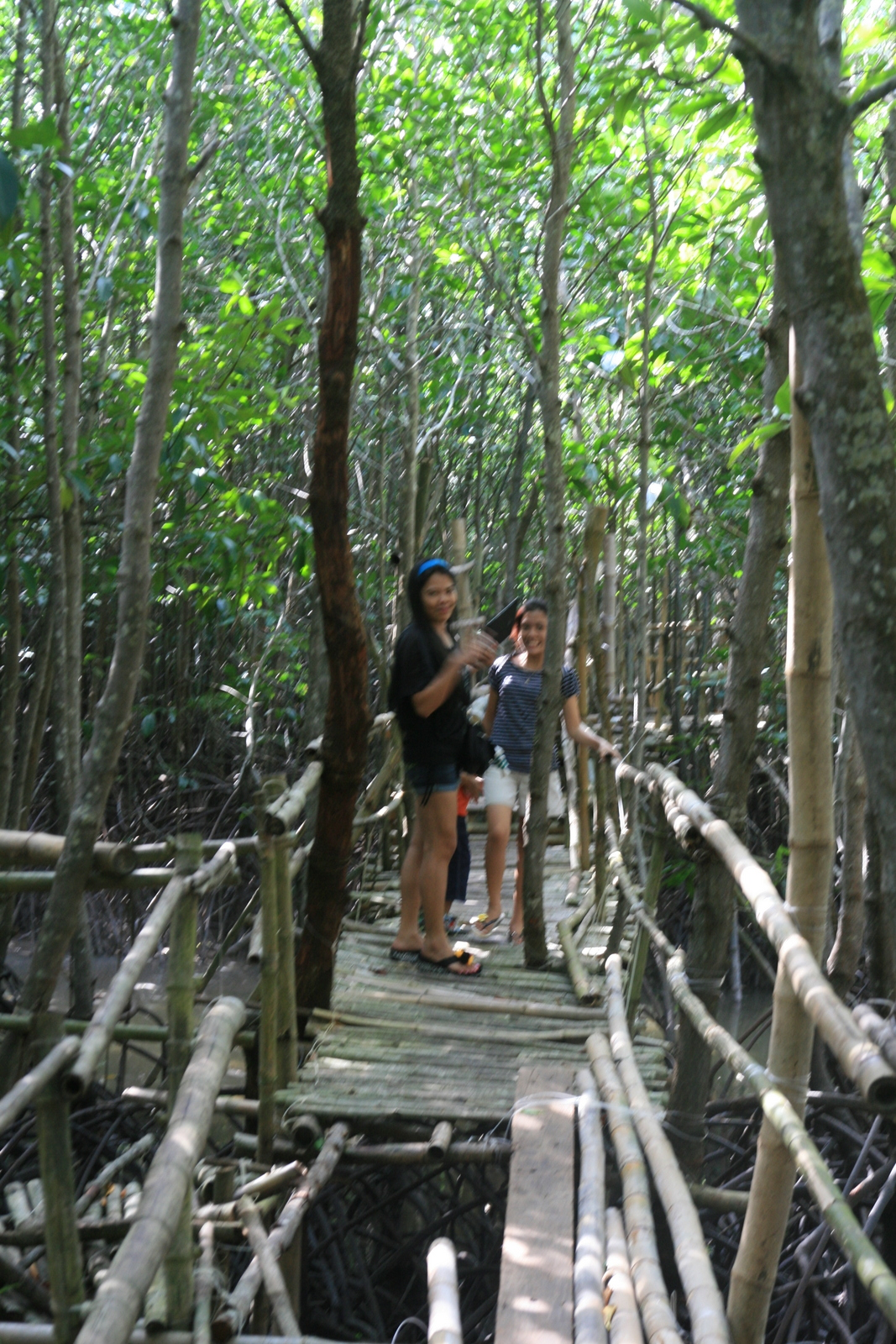
Walkway to the Obo‑ob Mangrove Garden

Private facilities which are open to the public include:

- Casa de Antiguedades – This is a private house whose owner is happy to show visitors some of the artefacts and objects he has collected over the years. No entrance fee, but a contribution to upkeep is appreciated.
- Obo‑ob Mangrove Garden – established by the residents of brgy Obo‑ob, the garden offers visitors a tour into the mangal forest along an elevated bamboo trail.
- St Helena Botanical Garden shows off a selection of exotic flowers and fruits.
- Bantayan Nature Park – this recently established (2012) place does not (yet) live up to its name.

=== Cockfighting ===
As is common throughout the Philippines, 'sport' is synonymous with cock-fighting. There is a large sports centre (cockpit) on the road to Santa Fe, which attracts a large clientele in Sundays. In addition, puroks can have their own arena, usually just a piece of land set aside for the purpose.

=== Festivals and processions ===
The Holy Week observance attracts large numbers of local and foreign tourists to the foot processions on Maundy Thursday and Good Friday, when life-sized images and icons are mounted on carrozas (floats) decorated in a carnival style that depict various tableaux of Christ's Passion and the Stations of the Cross.

Palawod is another festival held 29 June in honour of Sts. Peter & Paul. The street dancing and ritual showdown competitions which depict the fishing traditions of Bantayan have contributed to Palawod's being the 3-times Grand Champion of the Pasigarbo sa Sugbo Festival of Festivals.

Sinulog takes place at the end of January, when there are ten or more days of noisy celebration.

== Notable personalities ==
- Casimiro del Rosario – National Scientist of the Philippines for Physics, Astronomy, and Meteorology
- Auxiliary Bishop-Emeritus Emilio L. Bataclan - auxiliary bishop-emeritus of Cebu and former Bishop of Iligan
- Archbishop John F. Du – current archbishop of the Roman Catholic Archdiocese of Palo in Leyte
- Trizer D. Mansueto – historian

== Gallery ==
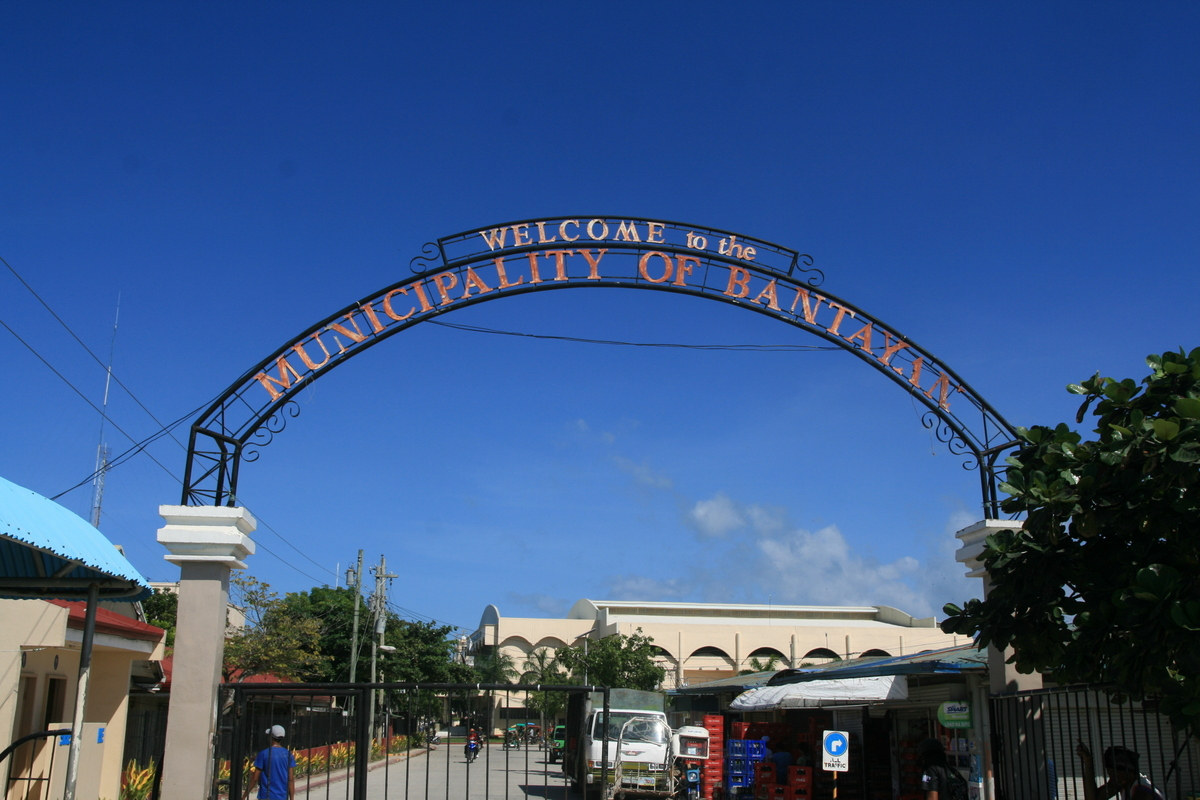
Arched sign on municipal quay

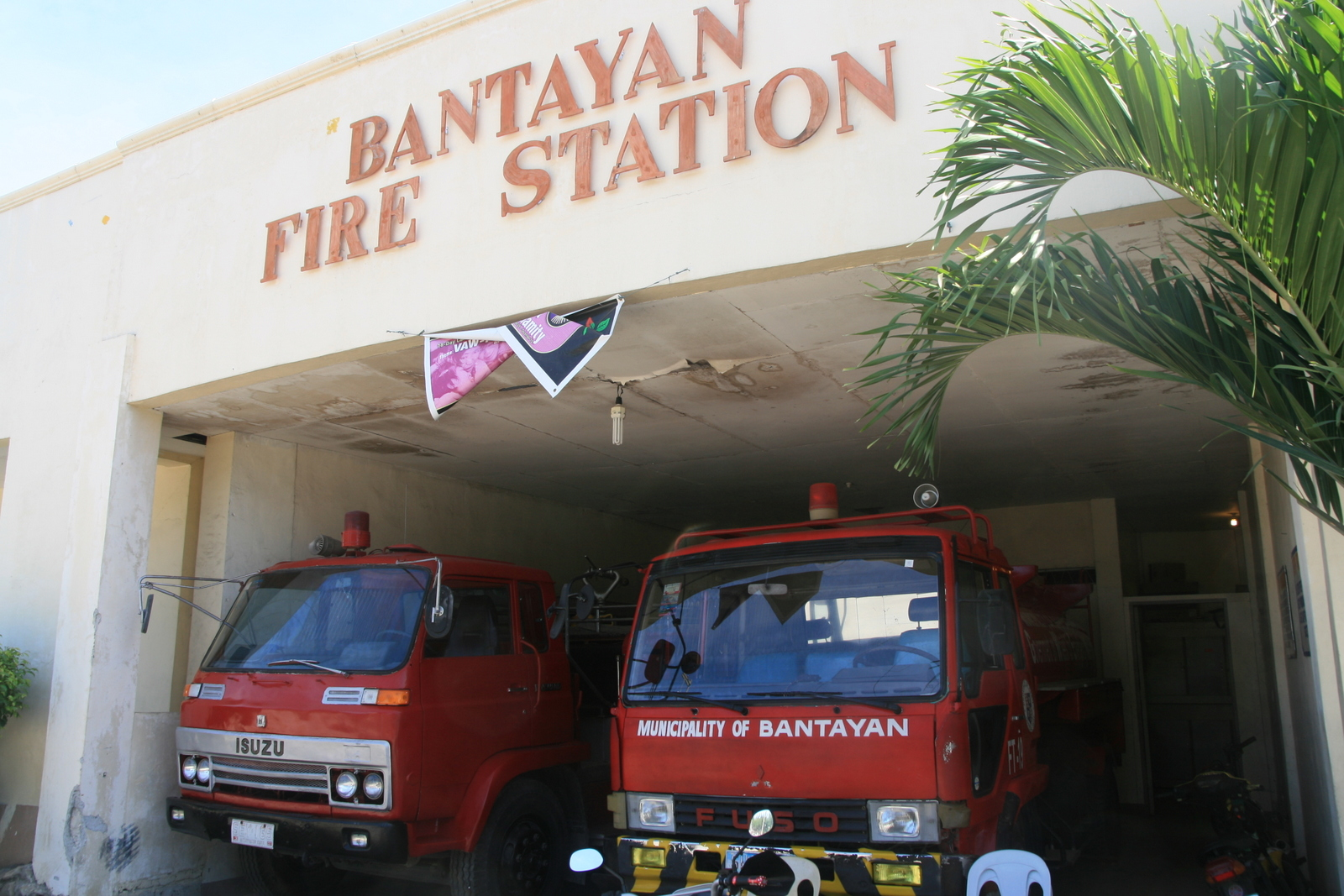
Bantayan fire station

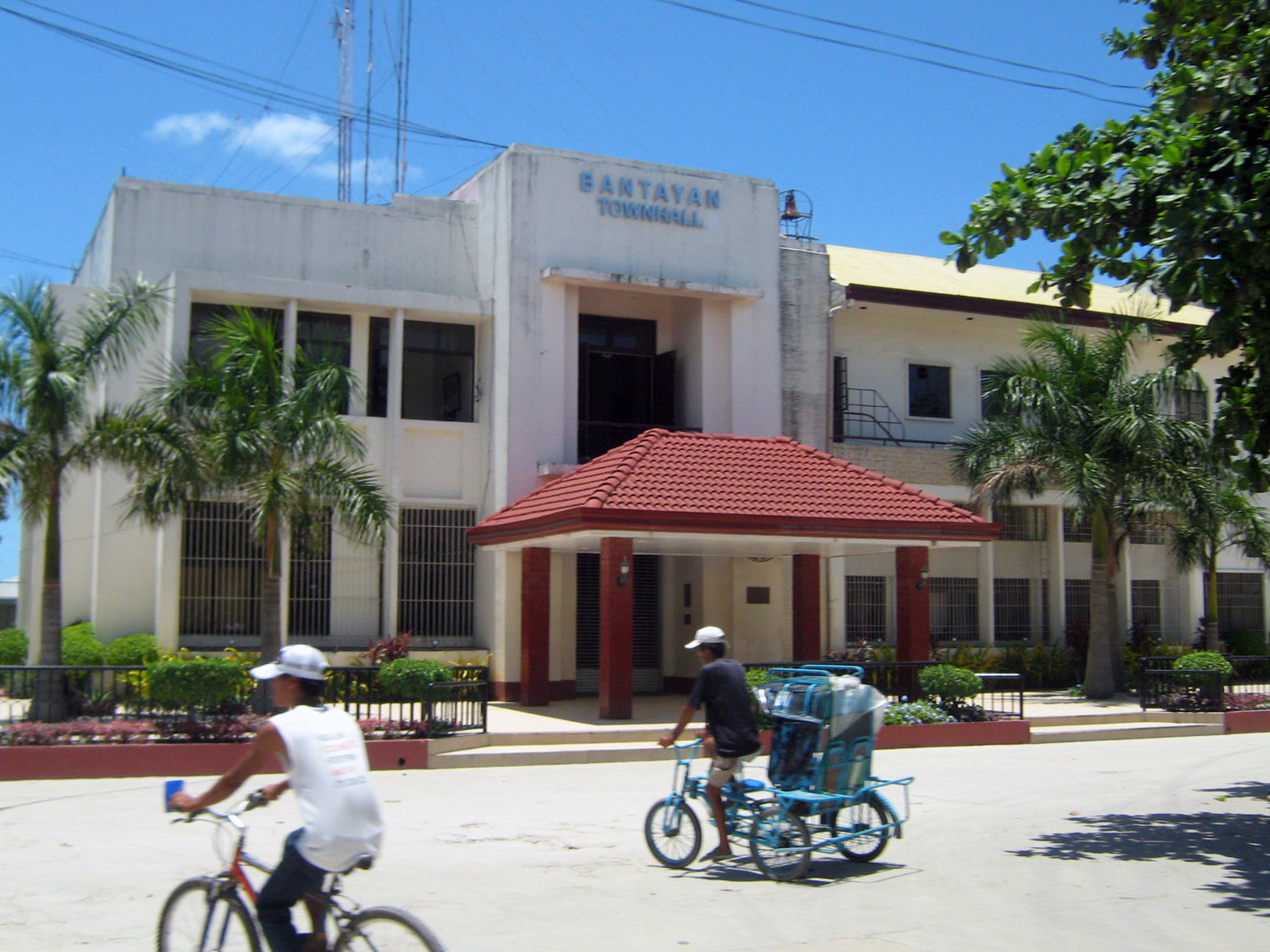
Bantayan municipal hall

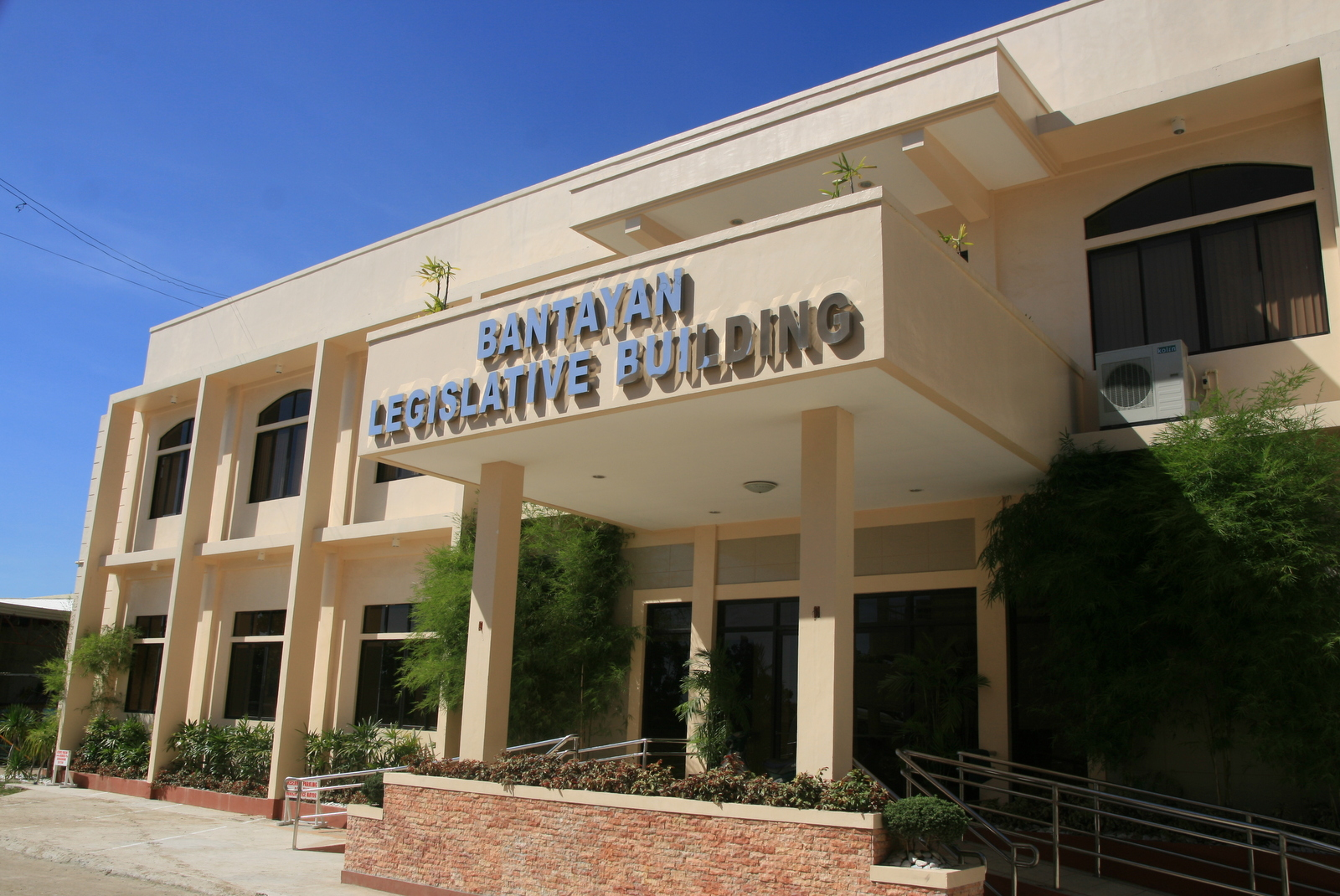
Bantayan legislative building

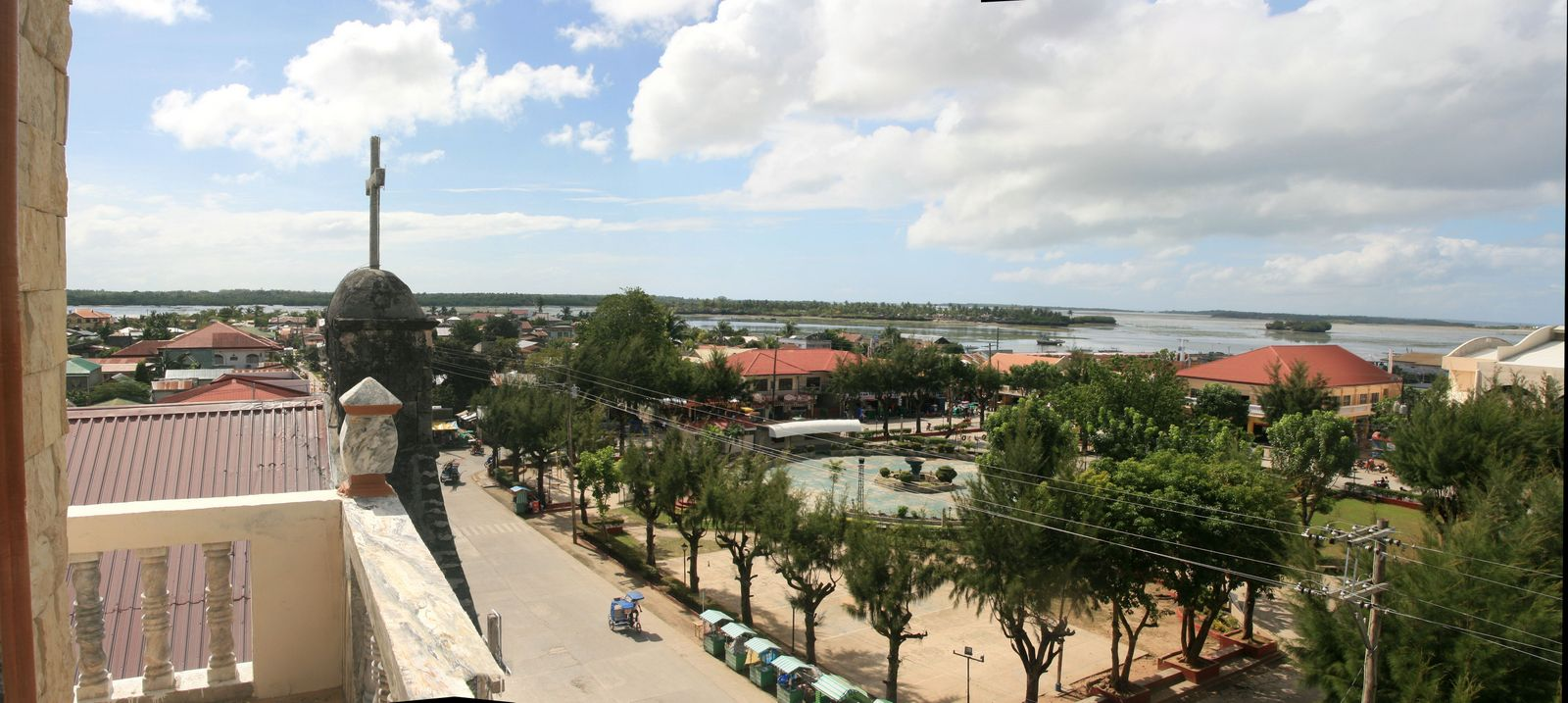
75° panorama from SS Peter & Paul belfry looking SW

== See also ==
- List of political families in the Philippines
- Political dynasties in the Philippines

== Sources ==
- Cebu Daily News, Joeber Bersales (13 September 2007). "Finding gold in Bantayan". Archived from the original (retrieved via Southeast Asian Archeology archive) on 2007-11-07.
- The Freeman, Reynan Villena (8 August 2010). "Casa de Antiguedades (House of Antiques)" (Cebu lifestyle). Archived from the original on 2015-11-10.
- The Freeman, Kristine B. Quintas (6 May 2017). "Comelec declares Escario Bantayan mayor".
