= Trizer D. Mansueto =

Filipino historian and author

- Born: Trizer Dale Dajuya Mansueto; Bantayan, Cebu, Philippines
- Education: Silliman University (BA, MA)
- Occupations: Historian, Academic, Columnist

Trizer Dale Dajuya Mansueto, is a Filipino historian.

== Early life ==
He earned a B.A. in History and a Master of Arts in History from Silliman University, Dumaguete, Philippines.

== Career ==
An author of several books, he is also involved in museums, translation and teaching. He contributes to Cebu Daily News and the Philippine Daily Inquirer.

He helped organize the Carcar City Museum in Carcar, Cebu, and the Cathedral Museum of Cebu, an ecclesiastical museum in 2006. He co-authored Balaanong Bahandi: Sacred Treasures of the Archdiocese of Cebu and Via Veritatis: The Life and Ministry of Ricardo Cardinal Vidal.

He was co-translator in English of Hunger in Nayawak together with Hope Sabanpan-Yu and translator in Cebuano of I See Cebu. His latest translation in Cebuano is a biography, Pedro Calungsod: Patron sa Kabatan-unang Pilipino originally in English by Salvador G. Agualada.

Mansueto was commissioned to write The History of Danao City of the Cebu Provincial History Project by the province of Cebu.

== Personal life ==
He lives in Bantayan, Cebu.
