= Amy Bach =

American writer (born 1968)

- Born: 1968 (age 57–58)
- Education: Brown University (BA); Stanford University (JD)
- Occupations: Founder and executive director of Measures for Justice
- Employer: Measures for Justice
- Notable credit: 2010 Robert F. Kennedy Book Award
- Spouse: John Markman
- Children: 1

Amy Bach (born 1968) is an American journalist, attorney, and author of Ordinary Injustice: How America Holds Court, for which she won the 2010 Robert F. Kennedy Book Award. She is the founder and executive director of Measures for Justice, a nonprofit that collects and publishes county-level criminal justice performance data. She founded the organization after she published her book.

== Background and education ==
Bach grew up in New York City, where she graduated from the Chapin School. She earned her bachelor's in English and American Literature at Brown University in Rhode Island and was a Knight Foundation Journalism Fellow at Yale Law School where she received her master's degree in law. Bach was the recipient of an Echoing Green Fellowship in 2011 and earned her Juris Doctor from Stanford Law School in 1998.

She has also received a Soros Media Fellowship, a fellowship from the Radcliffe Institute for Advanced Study, and a special J. Anthony Lucas citation. Bach is a member of the New York bar, and has taught as an adjunct professor at the University of Rochester.

In 2020, Bach was awarded the Dial Fellowship, named after a journal founded by Ralph Waldo Emerson and funded by Laurene Powell Jobs, through the Emerson Collective, a social change organization.

== Career ==
Bach worked as a freelance journalist, writing for The New York Times, The Nation, Slate (magazine), The American Lawyer, and New York Magazine.

In 2001, Bach wrote an article titled Justice on the Cheap, published in The Nation. The article followed Tasha McDonald and her difficulty in the Georgia court system. While writing the article, Bach began looking closely into the criminal court system. Bach, who spent eight years investigating the failure of the courts, and utilizing her background as an attorney and journalist, wrote her book, Ordinary Justice, which was published in 2009.

In 2010, part of an essay, published in The Crime Report, and adapted from a lecture in February 2010, Bach recalled:

"Many did not realize that their behavior had devastating consequences for ordinary peoples' lives. Their mistakes had become so routine that they could no longer see their role in them.

This is ordinary injustice.

There was something else I noticed in that Georgia courtroom. As I watched the cases proceed, it became increasingly harder to hear what was going on. The prosecutor and defense attorney huddled around the bench, speaking softly to the judge. It looked like they were all on the same team – rather than opposing advocates duking it out before a neutral arbiter. Steve Bright, of the Southern Center for Human Rights in Atlanta, asked the judge to speak up, and the judge installed a microphone. But the next day the microphone was gone. I went back and visited this court (with different sitting judges) for the next five years. There was never another microphone. And there was always a huddle."

— Amy Bach, February 15, 2010, essay adapted from the Law, Politics, and Media Lecture Series; S.I. Newhouse School of Public Communications at Syracuse University

After the publication of her book, Anthony Lewis of the New York Review of Books noted that "Bach has done something different: shown us the reality of the criminal justice process in microscopic, human detail. In different places across the country she watched went on in courtrooms. Her accounts of what she saw should open others' eyes to unwelcome reality. It is a revealing and important book," and the Milwaukee Journal Sentinel wrote that the book "Should be required reading for every judge, prosecutor, defense lawyer, clerk and defendant in courthouses everywhere."

In 2011, following the publication of her book, Bach founded Measures for Justice, a nonprofit that collects and publishes county-level criminal justice performance data, where she serves as the executive director.

== Awards and recognition ==
- 2005 Finalist Anthony Lukas Work-In-Progress Award, Columbia University Graduate School of Journalism.
- 2009 Green Bag Journal Award, for Exemplary Legal Writing in her book, Ordinary Injustice: How American Holds Court.
- 2010 Robert F. Kennedy Book Award, for Ordinary Injustice: How American Holds Court.
- 2018 The Academy of Criminal Justice Science's Leadership and Innovation Award.
- 2018 Charles Bronfman Prize for young humanitarians.

== Personal ==
Bach is married to John Markman, a doctor at the University of Rochester Medical Center. They have one son. They reside in Rochester, New York.
