= Measures for Justice =

US nonprofit organization

- Type: Criminal justice data transparency nonprofit organization, 501(c)(3)
- Founded: 2011, Rochester
- Headquarters: 421 University Avenue, Rochester, New York, 14607, United States
- Area served: United States
- Key people: Amy Bach (Executive Director)
- Revenue: ▲$4,305,451 (2016)
- Net income: ▲$1,744,454 (2016)
- Website: measuresforjustice.org

Measures for Justice is a United States, 501(c)(3), nonprofit organization designed to gather data from every county in the US on the criminal justice system and to run that data through a series of standardized performance metrics. Their aim is to foster more data-driven decision-making based on the performance and differences among counties. By the end of 2020, Measures for Justice had gathered data for 20 states. The data are publicly accessible on a user-friendly web portal.

== Purpose ==
Measures for Justice (MFJ)'s primary goal is to provide a US-wide open database on all counties' (c.3100) justice systems and processes. By standardizing the same core metrics across all counties it seeks to enable a like-for-like comparison for data that are frequently difficult to access and compare. By determining both negative, positive, and anomalous trends in system performance, MFJ aims to allow various groups in the justice system (district attorneys, public defenders, judges, legislators, etc.) to make more informed solutions.

== History ==
In 2010, Amy Bach published her book Ordinary Injustice: How America Holds Court, highlighting both systemic problems in the pursuit of justice and the dearth of information about how the system operates, with a lack of awareness both outside and within the systems.

In 2011 MFJ was founded as a non-profit by Bach with a seed-stage grant from Echoing Green and MFJ researched and drafted the initial standardized metrics to be used.

In 2013, the Department of Justice funded a pilot study in Milwaukee County, Wisconsin. After initial verification that the process worked the pilot remit was expanded to cover all 72 counties in Wisconsin.

2015 was the primary growth year, with a $3 million grant from the Pershing Square Foundation allowing immediate expansion into five other states: Washington, Utah, Pennsylvania, North Carolina, and Florida, with roughly 370 counties' data gathered. The initial alpha prototype of the visualization software was created and door to door verification of key otherwise-unobtainable data was begun. The "20 states by 2020" campaign was commenced in 2016, primarily funded by Google ($1.5 million) and Chan Zuckerberg Initiative ($6.5 million), and the goal of 20 states was reached in December 2020.

In 2021, MFJ launched Commons, a data dashboard to provide ongoing, open access to specific counties' criminal justice data.

== Methodology ==
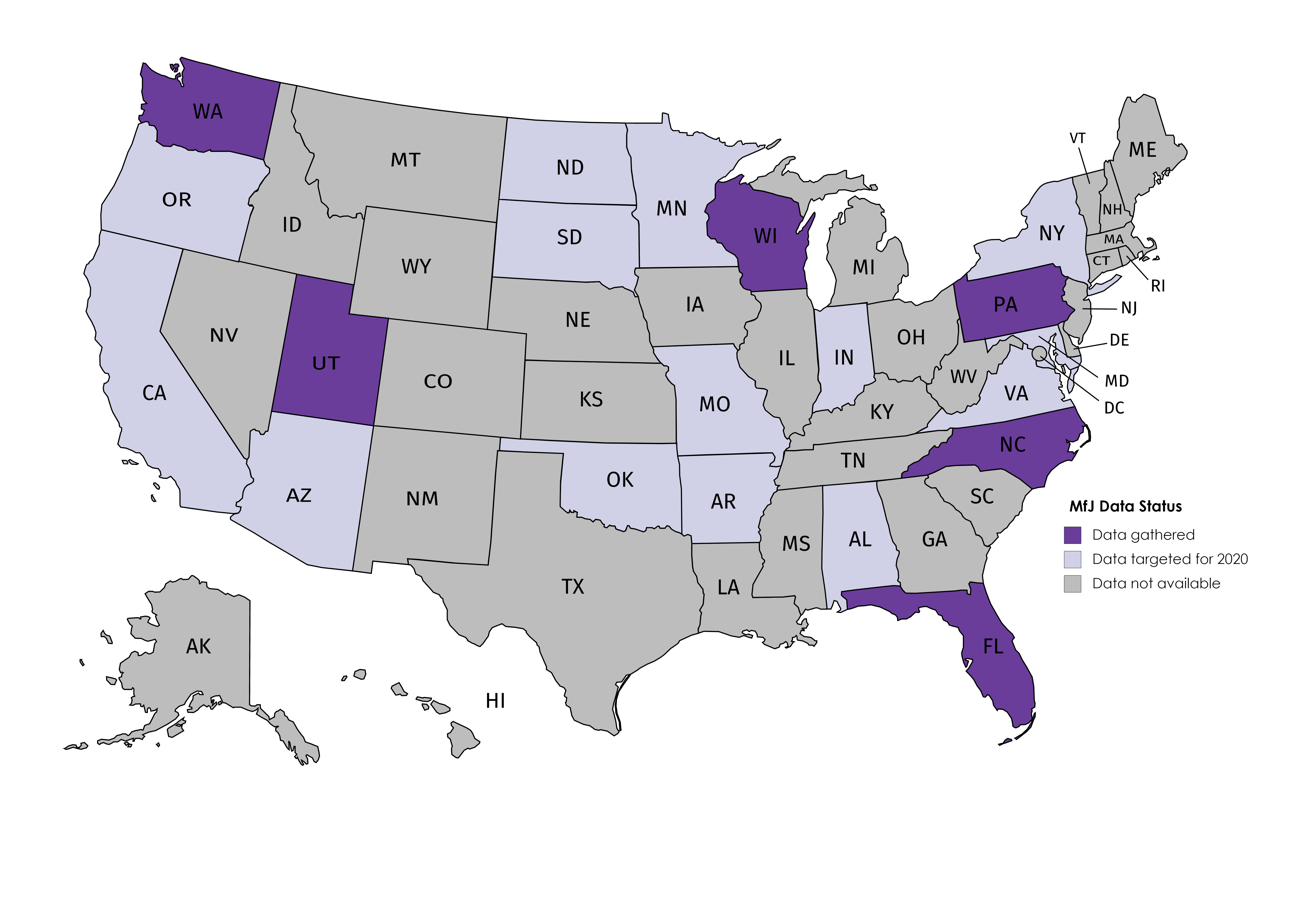
Status of Measures for Justice data gathering operation

=== Data acquisition and impact ===
The organization's data acquisition process begins with collecting data from U.S. statewide court datasets; often, these populate the majority of the measures. MFJ may also approach local agencies (prosecutors' offices, sheriffs' offices, public defenders' offices, etc.) to acquire supplemental data; this is done in writing or in person, via pairs of MFJ researchers who travel the states county by county.

After meeting with Measures for Justice to talk about criminal justice data, in 2018 Florida lawmakers passed laws requiring "its jails, prosecutors, public defenders, courts and prisons to coordinate their data collection, enabling lawmakers and the public to track how someone moves through the entire criminal justice system, from arrest to release." In 2019 Connecticut passed a law requiring standardized recording of prosecutorial data.

=== Data analysis ===
In order to help align data using different titles for the same concepts, or different definitions for the same words, automated character tracking is used on the various data sets to enable harmonizing.

This, coupled with more conventional deep dives, allows equivalent data to be extracted. This is then mapped against census data to provide contextual analysis.

Comparative analysis is undertaken both intrastate, to provide information on how a county is doing compared to its counterparts; and inter-state, to allow a more countrywide analysis. Each data sample is designed for filtering, to allow a finer-grain analysis to provide the "in which circumstances does county X do well or poorly".

=== Presentation of data ===
Data is presented in a user-navigable data portal, allowing selections of both criteria, geographical spread and appearance to allow customizable consideration. The metrics can either be considered in bar graph format or in map form (state-wide or nation-wide) to allow better geographical comparison. The data can also be filtered by various demographics and the base figures downloaded, with explanations provided for why each metric is important.

== Key discoveries and changes ==
=== Bail-granting ===
Some individuals unable to make a low bail were being kept in jail on weekends/holidays in Winnebago county as a prosecutor was needed for a probable cause session with a judge, and prosecutors were only present on weekdays. Once at that session, the bail was usually being totally waived by the judge. County officials used the data to realize that scrapping the need for the prosecutor at a session would lead to savings with no actual change in the ultimate bail result - enabling shorter stays in jail, and thus lower costs for the county and negatives for the accused.

=== Interpretation of data ===
MFJ found that the absence of clearcut data was leading to the scarce data being interpreted in different ways, such as during California's consideration of whether to scrap cash bail. Reform and opposition groups clashed as to the apparent cost for its abolition and significant numbers of reformers dropped their support for the scheme due to fears it would actually increase the numbers in prison.

=== Disparate impact ===
A prosecutor in Wisconsin identified that white defendants were being moved into drug rehabilitation diversion programs 1.8 times as frequently as non-white defendants. This had been identified before, however by use of the gathered data, he was able to identify that all defendants were equally likely to be offered the program. The difference was being caused in a lower take-up rate. This allows effort to be targeting at pushing the benefits of the schemes to defendants, rather than at the judges and lawyers for racial discrimination.

On a more positive note, it was able to confirm to certain counties that efforts to reduce racial disparity in charge/no-charge decisions were succeeding, particularly in comparison to statewide performance.

== Controversies ==
In Florida there were initially issues with compliance costs for handling the new reporting requirements. A significant initial outlay of costs and time is required for compliance, distracting resources from other goals. In the 2019 legislative session, Florida lawmakers passed an amendment that appropriated an additional $5.7 million for the criminal justice transparency initiative.

Some, including MFJ advocates, have argued that MFJ's data dives cannot provide a full picture because they do not seek out any data on either police behavior or on what happens before the initial arrest of an individual.
