= Joe Mansueto =

American entrepreneur (born 1956)

- Born: Joseph Daniel Mansueto; September 3, 1956 (age 69); Munster, Indiana, U.S.
- Education: University of Chicago (AB, MBA)
- Known for: Founder, majority owner and executive chairman of Morningstar, Inc. Owner of Chicago Fire FC and FC Lugano
- Spouse: Rika Yoshida
- Children: 3

Joseph Daniel Mansueto (born September 3, 1956) is an American billionaire entrepreneur. Mansueto is the founder, majority owner, and executive chairman of Morningstar, Inc. Through his company Mansueto Ventures, he also owns the financial magazines Inc. and Fast Company.

Mansueto is also the owner of Major League Soccer club Chicago Fire FC and Swiss Super League club FC Lugano.

== Early life and education ==
Joe Mansueto was born in Munster, Indiana, the son of Mario Mansueto, an Italian doctor. He attended Munster High School and graduated with a bachelor's and master's degrees in Business Administration from the University of Chicago.

== Career ==
In 1984, Mansueto founded Morningstar out of his home with $80,000. Morningstar went public in May 2005.

Through his company Mansueto Ventures, Mansueto purchased the financial magazines Inc. and Fast Company in June 2005. He was a limited partner in the publication of the entertainment magazine Time Out Chicago from 2005 to 2013.

As of June 2008, Mansueto owned about 60.4% of Morningstar common stock.

In September 2016, Morningstar announced that it had appointed Kunal Kapoor as chief executive officer, effective January 2017, with Mansueto becoming executive chairman at the same time.

In July 2018, Mansueto reportedly purchased a 49 percent stake in the Chicago Fire, a Major League Soccer team based in Bridgeview, Illinois. On September 13, 2019, it was announced that Mansueto had acquired full control of the Fire from Andrew Hauptman ahead of the club's move to Soldier Field.

In August 2021, Mansueto reportedly purchased FC Lugano, a soccer team competing in the Swiss Super League, and that they would work with Chicago Fire, interchanging players when needed.

In 2024, his majority ownership of Morningstar gained him inclusion on the Forbes "World's Billionaires" list, with a net worth at time of publication of $6.7 billion.

== Philanthropy ==
In May 2008, it was reported that Mansueto and his wife Rika pledged $25 million to the expansion of the Joseph Regenstein Library at the University of Chicago. The new wing, called the Joe and Rika Mansueto Library and designed by Chicago-based architect Helmut Jahn, was completed in May 2011.

As of December 2010, Mansueto was the only Chicagoan on the list of American billionaires pledging to give away half of their wealth, as part of The Giving Pledge started by Warren Buffett.

In the spring of 2016, Mansueto and his wife Rika announced a donation of $35 million to found the Mansueto Institute for Urban Innovation, a part of the University of Chicago committed to advancing urban science through interdisciplinary scholarship.

In April 2026, they announced a donation of $50 million to fund multidisciplinary AI and machine learning research at the University of Chicago. This donation is planned to inspire further fundraising through matching and fund the recruitment of 20 additional faculty in AI research.

== Personal life ==
In 1998, Mansueto married Japanese-American Rika Yoshida, a Morningstar analyst. They have three children, and live in a home in Lincoln Park, Chicago that cost an estimated $22 million to build.

Mansueto's younger brother John died in 2003 of West Nile virus.
