= 2015 Chicago Fire season =

Chicago Fire
2015 season
- Chairman: Andrew Hauptman
- Head coach: Frank Yallop (until September 20); Brian Bliss (interim) (from September 20)
- Stadium: Toyota Park (capacity: 20,000)
- MLS: Conference: 10th (last); Overall: 20th (last)
- MLS Cup Playoffs: Did not qualify
- U.S. Open Cup: Semifinals
- Brimstone Cup: Winners
- Top goalscorer: David Accam (10)
- Highest home attendance: 20,280 vs Orlando City SC (September 19)
- Lowest home attendance: 11,196 vs New York Red Bulls (August 26)
- Average home league attendance: 16,003 (regular season)
- Biggest win: CHI 3-0 MTL (5/30)
- Biggest defeat: DC 4-0 CHI (10/18)
Home colors	Away colors	Third colors

The 2015 Chicago Fire season was the club's 17th year of existence, as well as their 18th season in Major League Soccer and their 18th consecutive year in the top-flight of American soccer.

Chicago Fire began the regular season on March 6, 2015 with an away match against the defending champions LA Galaxy. They finished the regular season on October 25, 2015, with a home match against the New York Red Bulls. The club has missed the playoffs for the fifth time in the past six years.

For the first time in the franchise history Chicago Fire opened the season with three consecutive losses.

On September 20, 2015, entrenched in last place both in the conference and overall, with the playoff hopes out of sight, the club parted ways with head coach and director of soccer Frank Yallop and assistant coaches Marc Bircham and Clint Mathis. In two seasons with the Fire Yallop posted a 13-26-24 record. Fire named the technical director Brian Bliss as interim coach, while the vice president and former player Logan Pause took over as interim assistant coach. The club also hired Nelson Rodriguez, a former MLS executive, as new general manager.

On October 3, 2015, Ante Razov, the club's all-time leading scorer, became the eighth individual to be inducted into the club's Ring of Fire Hall of Fame. The ceremony took place during the halftime of the regular season home match against New England Revolution.

On October 14, 2015 Chicago Fire announced the end of a four-year run with the title sponsor Quaker and introduced Valspar as the new jersey sponsor starting with 2016 season. The three-year deal is worth between $2.5 million and $3 million per year.

For the first time in the club's history Fire finished the season with zero road wins (0-12-5). The club has finished the season with an overall record of 8 wins, 20 losses and 6 ties. Twenty losses in a season became the highest in the club's history. The club has finished the season in last place in the league overall, also another first in the club's history.

== Squad at the end of the season ==
As of October 25, 2015. Source: Chicago Fire official roster

No.	Name	Nationality	Position	Date of birth (aged)	Previous club
Goalkeepers
1	Alec Kann	(United States)	GK	August 8, 1990 (aged 25)	(United States) Charleston Battery
18	Jon Busch	(United States)	GK	August 18, 1976 (aged 39)	(United States) San Jose Earthquakes
25	Sean Johnson	(United States)	GK	May 31, 1989 (aged 26)	(United States) Atlanta Blackhawks
Defenders
2	Matt Polster	(United States)	D	June 8, 1993 (aged 22)	(United States) SIU Edwardsville Cougars
3	Joevin Jones	(Trinidad and Tobago)	D	August 3, 1991 (aged 24)	(Finland) HJK Helsinki
4	Adaílton	(Brazil)	CB	April 16, 1983 (aged 32)	(Brazil) Esporte Clube Bahia
5	Lovel Palmer	(Jamaica)	RB	August 30, 1984 (aged 31)	(United States) Real Salt Lake
6	Eric Gehrig	(United States)	D	December 15, 1987 (aged 27)	(United States) Columbus Crew SC
16	Greg Cochrane	(United States)	D	November 1, 1990 (aged 24)	(United States) Los Angeles Galaxy
20	Jeff Larentowicz	(United States)	D	August 5, 1983 (aged 32)	(United States) Colorado Rapids
22	Patrick Doody	(United States)	D	April 22, 1992 (aged 23)	(United States) Indiana University Hoosiers
24	Ty Harden	(United States)	D	March 6, 1984 (aged 31)	(United States) San Jose Earthquakes
55	Daneil Cyrus	(Trinidad and Tobago)	D	December 15, 1990 (aged 24)	(Trinidad and Tobago) W Connection F.C.
Midfielders
8	Matt Watson	(England)	M	January 1, 1985 (aged 30)	(Canada) Vancouver Whitecaps FC
17	Collin Fernandez	(United States)	M	February 13, 1997 (aged 18)	(United States) Chicago Fire Juniors
19	Harry Shipp	(United States)	M	November 7, 1991 (aged 23)	(United States) University of Notre Dame Fighting Irish
21	Chris Ritter	(United States)	M	October 29, 1990 (aged 24)	(United States) Northwestern University Wildcats
26	Michael Stephens	(United States)	M	April 3, 1989 (aged 26)	(Norway) Stabæk
27	Kingsley Bryce	(United States)	M	April 16, 1993 (aged 22)	(United States) Saint Louis University
30	Răzvan Cociș	(Romania)	M	February 19, 1983 (aged 32)	(Ukraine) FC Hoverla Uzhhorod
Forwards
7	Jason Johnson	(Jamaica)	F	October 9, 1990 (aged 25)	(United States) Houston Dynamo
9	Mike Magee	(United States)	F	September 2, 1984 (aged 31)	(United States) Los Angeles Galaxy
11	David Accam	(Ghana)	F	September 28, 1990 (aged 25)	(Sweden) Helsingborgs IF
14	Patrick Nyarko	(Ghana)	F	January 15, 1986 (aged 29)	(United States) Virginia Tech Hokies
29	Gilberto	(Brazil)	F	June 5, 1989 (aged 26)	(Canada) Toronto FC
77	Kennedy Igboananike	(Nigeria)	F	February 26, 1989 (aged 26)	(Sweden) AIK

== Player movement ==
=== In ===
Per Major League Soccer and club policies terms of the deals do not get disclosed.

Date	Player	Position	Previous club	Notes	Ref
October 29, 2014	(Jamaica) Lovel Palmer	D	(United States) Chicago Fire	Re-signed with the club	
November 18, 2014	(Ghana) Patrick Nyarko	F	(United States) Chicago Fire	Re-signed with the club	
December 2, 2014	(Nigeria) Kennedy Igboananike	F	(Sweden) AIK	Signed as a Designated Player	
December 3, 2014	(Trinidad and Tobago) Joevin Jones	D	(Finland) HJK Helsinki	Signed with the club	
December 9, 2014	(United States) Michael Stephens	M	(Norway) Stabæk	Signed with the club	
December 10, 2014	(United States) Eric Gehrig	D	(United States) Columbus Crew SC (United States) Orlando City SC	After being selected by Orlando City SC from Columbus Crew SC as the tenth pick in the 2014 MLS Expansion Draft, Chicago Fire acquired his Right of First Refusal in exchange for the natural selection in the second round of the 2016 MLS SuperDraft; he was signed on December 16	
December 19, 2014	(Ghana) David Accam	F	(Sweden) Helsingborgs IF	Signed as a Designated Player	
December 22, 2014	(United States) Patrick Doody	D	(United States) Indiana University Hoosiers	Signed as a Homegrown Player	
December 30, 2014	(Brazil) Adaílton	D	(Brazil) Esporte Clube Bahia	Signed with the club	
January 6, 2015	(Brazil) Guly do Prado	F	(England) Southampton F.C.	Signed with the club	
January 25, 2015	(Scotland) Shaun Maloney	M	(England) Wigan Athletic	Signed as a Designated Player	
January 25, 2015	(Brazil) Alex	M	(United States) Chicago Fire	Re-signed with the club, after initially having his contract option declined	
January 27, 2015	(United States) Jon Busch	GK	(United States) San Jose Earthquakes	Signed with the club	
February 4, 2015	(United States) Matt Polster	D	(United States) SIU Edwardsville Cougars	Signed with the club after being selected 7th overall (first round) in 2015 MLS SuperDraft	
March 24, 2015	(United States) Kingsley Bryce	M	(United States) Saint Louis University	Signed with the club after being selected 28th overall (second round) in 2015 MLS SuperDraft	
April 13, 2015	(Jamaica) Jason Johnson	F	(United States) Houston Dynamo	Acquired in exchange for Alex	
June 26, 2015	(United States) Ty Harden	D	(United States) San Jose Earthquakes	Acquired in exchange for Quincy Amarikwa	
July 27, 2015	(Brazil) Gilberto	F	(Canada) Toronto FC	Acquired as a Designated Player after claiming him on waivers	

=== Out ===
Date	Player	Position	Destination club	Notes	Ref
October 25, 2014	(United States) Logan Pause	M	None	Retired	
November 18, 2014	(United States) Marco Franco	D	(United States) Indy Eleven	2015 contract option was declined	
November 18, 2014	(United States) Patrick Ianni	D	None	2015 contract option was declined, subsequently retired on January 12, 2015	
November 18, 2014	(United States) Hunter Jumper	D	None	2015 contract option was declined	
November 18, 2014	(United States) Steven Kinney	D	None	2015 contract option was declined	
November 18, 2014	(Costa Rica) Gonzalo Segares	D	None	2015 contract option was declined, subsequently retired on February 4, 2015	
November 18, 2014	(Mali) Bakary Soumaré	D	(Canada) Montreal Impact	2015 contract option was declined; selected by Montreal Impact in the Re-Entry Draft	
November 18, 2014	(The Gambia) Sanna Nyassi	M	(United States) San Jose Earthquakes	2015 contract option was declined; selected by San Jose Earthquakes in the Re-Entry Draft	
November 18, 2014	(Wales) Robert Earnshaw	F	(Canada) Vancouver Whitecaps FC	2015 contract option was declined	
November 18, 2014	(United States) Matthew Fondy	F	(United States) Louisville City FC	2015 contract option was declined	
November 18, 2014	(France) Florent Sinama Pongolle	F	(France) Lausanne-Sport	2015 contract option was declined	
November 18, 2014	(United States) Victor Pineda	M	(United States) Indy Eleven	Out of contract	
November 18, 2014	(United States) Benji Joya	M	(Mexico) Santos Laguna	Loan deal has expired	
November 18, 2014	(England) Grant Ward	M	(England) Tottenham Hotspur	Loan deal has expired	
December 18, 2014	(Ecuador) Juan Luis Anangonó	F	(Mexico) Universidad de Guadalajara	Transferred after six-month loan with LDU Quito	
January 20, 2015	(United States) Kyle Reynish	GK	(United States) New York Red Bulls	Traded in exchange for 2016 MLS SuperDraft third round pick	
April 13, 2015	(Brazil) Alex	M	(United States) Houston Dynamo	Traded in exchange for Jason Johnson	
June 9, 2015	(Spain) Víctor Pérez	M	(Spain) Real Valladolid	Loan deal not extended	
June 26, 2015	(United States) Quincy Amarikwa	F	(United States) San Jose Earthquakes	Traded in exchange for Ty Harden	
August 4, 2015	(Brazil) Guly do Prado	F	None	The club and the player have mutually agreed to part ways	
August 27, 2015	(Scotland) Shaun Maloney	M	(England) Hull City	Transferred	

- Players selected in 2015 MLS SuperDraft, but ultimately not signed: midfielder Alex Shinsky (68th overall, fourth round, from University of Maryland)
- Trialists released in the preseason: goalkeeper Mark Pais, defender Joachim de Wilde, defender Bryan Gaul (Open Tryout winner), defender Nick Miele, defender Albert Edward, midfielder Franck Songo'o, midfielder Alou Diarra, defender Danny Gabbidon and forward Shahdon Winchester.

=== Loans ===
Per Major League Soccer and club policies terms of the deals do not get disclosed.

==== In ====
Date	Player	Position	Loaned from	Notes	Ref
August 6, 2015	(Trinidad and Tobago) Daneil Cyrus	D	(Trinidad and Tobago) W Connection F.C.	Acquired on loan	

==== Out ====
Date	Player	Position	Loaned to	Notes	Ref
July 9, 2013	(Uruguay) Álvaro Fernández	M	(Uruguay) Gimnasia y Esgrima La Plata	Out on loan	
March 20, 2015	(United States) Patrick Doody	D	(United States) Saint Louis FC	Out on loan with option to recall	
March 30, 2015	(United States) Alec Kann	GK	(United States) Saint Louis FC	Out on loan with option to recall	
April 9, 2015	(United States) Greg Cochrane	D	(United States) Saint Louis FC	Out on loan with option to recall	
June 9, 2015	(United States) Collin Fernandez	M	(United States) Louisville City FC	Out on loan with option to recall	

== Technical staff at the end of the season ==
Position	Staff
General Manager	(United States) Nelson Rodríguez
Technical Director and Interim Head Coach	(United States) Brian Bliss
Interim Assistant Coach	(United States) Logan Pause
Goalkeeping Coach	(England) Aron Hyde
Strength and Conditioning Coach	(England) Adrian Lamb
Head of Scouting	(England) Trevor James
Director of Soccer & Team Development	(United States) Paul Cadwell
Director of Team Operations	(United States) Ron Stern
Academy Director	(United States) Larry Sunderland
Senior Coordinator of Team Operations	(United States) Alex Boler
Head Equipment Manager	(United States) Charles Raycroft
Assistant Equipment Manager	(United States) Allan Araujo
Head Athletic Trainer	(United States) Frank Pena
Assistant Athletic Trainer	(United States) Steve Bagus, ATC, NASM-PES
Massage Therapist	(United States) Jake Bronowski, LMT
Chief Medical Officer	(United States) Dr. Jeffrey Mjaanes, M.D.
Associate Medical Officer	(United States) Dr. Joshua Blomgren, D.O.

Last updated: November 12, 2015
Source: Chicago Fire Technical Staff

== Standings ==
=== Eastern Conference table ===
Pos	Team	Pld	W	L	T	GF	GA	GD	Pts	Qualification
1	New York Red Bulls	34	18	10	6	62	43	+19	60	MLS Cup Conference Semifinals
2	Columbus Crew	34	15	11	8	58	53	+5	53	MLS Cup Conference Semifinals
3	Montreal Impact	34	15	13	6	48	44	+4	51	MLS Cup Knockout Round
4	D.C. United	34	15	13	6	43	45	−2	51	MLS Cup Knockout Round
5	New England Revolution	34	14	12	8	48	47	+1	50	MLS Cup Knockout Round
6	Toronto FC	34	15	15	4	58	58	0	49	MLS Cup Knockout Round
7	Orlando City SC	34	12	14	8	46	56	−10	44	
8	New York City FC	34	10	17	7	49	58	−9	37	
9	Philadelphia Union	34	10	17	7	42	55	−13	37	
10	Chicago Fire	34	8	20	6	43	58	−15	30	

Source: MLS

=== Overall table ===
Pos	Team	Pld	W	L	T	GF	GA	GD	Pts	Qualification
1	New York Red Bulls (S)	34	18	10	6	62	43	+19	60	CONCACAF Champions League
2	FC Dallas	34	18	10	6	52	39	+13	60	CONCACAF Champions League
3	Vancouver Whitecaps FC	34	16	13	5	45	36	+9	53	CONCACAF Champions League
4	Columbus Crew	34	15	11	8	58	53	+5	53	
5	Portland Timbers (C)	34	15	11	8	41	39	+2	53	CONCACAF Champions League
6	Seattle Sounders FC	34	15	13	6	44	36	+8	51	
7	Montreal Impact	34	15	13	6	48	44	+4	51	
8	D.C. United	34	15	13	6	43	45	−2	51	
9	LA Galaxy	34	14	11	9	56	46	+10	51	
10	Sporting Kansas City	34	14	11	9	48	45	+3	51	CONCACAF Champions League
11	New England Revolution	34	14	12	8	48	47	+1	50	
12	Toronto FC	34	15	15	4	58	58	0	49	
13	San Jose Earthquakes	34	13	13	8	41	39	+2	47	
14	Orlando City SC	34	12	14	8	46	56	−10	44	
15	Houston Dynamo	34	11	14	9	42	49	−7	42	
16	Real Salt Lake	34	11	15	8	38	48	−10	41	
17	New York City FC	34	10	17	7	49	58	−9	37	
18	Philadelphia Union	34	10	17	7	42	55	−13	37	
19	Colorado Rapids	34	9	15	10	33	43	−10	37	
20	Chicago Fire	34	8	20	6	43	58	−15	30	

Source: MLS
Rules for classification: 1) points; 2) total wins; 3) total goal differential; 4) total goals scored
(C) MLS Cup Champion; (S) Supporters' Shield

=== Results summary ===
Overall								Home						Away					
Pld	Pts	W	L	T	GF	GA	GD	W	L	T	GF	GA	GD	W	L	T	GF	GA	GD
34	30	8	20	6	43	58	−15	8	8	1	23	19	+4	0	12	5	20	39	−19

Source: MLSsoccer.com standings
Pld = Matches played; Pts = Points; W = Matches won; T = Matches tied; L = Matches lost; GF = Goals for; GA = Goals against; GD = Goal difference

=== Results ===
Round	1	2	3	4	5	6	7	8	9	10	11	12	13	14	15	16	17	18	19	20	21	22	23	24	25	26	27	28	29	30	31	32	33	34
Stadium	A	H	A	H	H	H	A	H	A	A	H	A	H	A	H	A	H	H	A	H	H	A	A	H	H	A	A	A	H	A	A	H	A	H
Result	L	L	L	W	W	W	L	L	T	T	W	L	L	L	L	T	W	L	L	T	W	L	T	L	W	T	L	L	L	L	L	W	L	L

Updated to match(es) played on October 25, 2015. Source: MLS Results and Chicago Fire Schedule
A = Away; H = Home; W = Win; L = Loss; T = Tie

== Match results ==
Win Tie Loss

=== Preseason ===
Kickoff times are in CST (UTC-06)

Thurs., February 5, 2015 Preseason	Norwich City (England)	0–0	Chicago Fire	Norwich, England
6:00		Report		Stadium: Colney Training Centre; Attendance: closed-door

Thurs., February 12, 2015 Preseason	Queens Park Rangers (England)	0–1	Chicago Fire	London, England
7:00		Report	Quincy Amarikwa 15'	Stadium: QPR Training Centre

Simple Invitational

Pos	Team	Pld	W	L	T	GF	GA	GD	Pts
1	(Canada) Vancouver Whitecaps FC	3	2	0	1	5	3	+2	7
2	(United States) Portland Timbers	3	1	1	1	2	2	0	4
3	(United States) Chicago Fire	3	0	0	3	2	2	0	3
4	(Norway) Stabæk	3	0	2	1	2	4	−2	1

Sun., February 22, 2015 Simple Invitational	Chicago Fire	0–0	(Norway) Stabæk	Portland, Oregon
16:30	Răzvan Cociș (yellow card) 51'	Report		Stadium: Providence Park

Wed., February 25, 2015 Simple Invitational	Portland Timbers	1–1	Chicago Fire	Portland, Oregon, U.S.
19:30 (PST)	Michael Nanchoff 22'; George Fochive (yellow card) 30' (red card) 88'; Jeanderson (yellow card) 55'	Report	Quincy Amarikwa (yellow card) 4'; Norberto Paparatto 44' (o.g.); Chris Ritter (yellow card) 87'	Stadium: Providence Park; Attendance: 10,417

Sat., February 28, 2015 Simple Invitational	Vancouver Whitecaps FC	1–1	Chicago Fire	Portland, Oregon
16:30	Pa Modou Kah 31'; Kendall Waston (yellow card) 52'	Report	Shahdon Winchester 90'	Stadium: Providence Park

=== Major League Soccer ===
Kickoff times are in CDT (UTC-05), unless posted otherwise

Friday, March 6, 2015 Match 1	LA Galaxy	2–0	Chicago Fire	Carson, California
21:00 CST (UTC-06)	Walker (yellow card) 61'; Villarreal 65'; Keane 81'	Report	Maloney (yellow card) 22'; Prado (yellow card) 75'	Stadium: StubHub Center; Attendance: 27,000; Referee: Jair Marrufo

Saturday, March 14, 2015 Match 2	Chicago Fire	0–1	Vancouver Whitecaps FC	Bridgeview, Illinois
17:00	Polster (yellow card) 4'; Igboananike (yellow card) 90+6'	Report	Waston (yellow card) 22'; Morales (yellow card) 66'; Mezquida (yellow card) 76'; Rivero (yellow card) 82', (goal) 86'	Stadium: Toyota Park; Attendance: 15,731; Referee: Fotis Bazakos

Sunday, March 22, 2015 Match 3	San Jose Earthquakes	2–1	Chicago Fire	San Jose, California
18:00	Alashe 5'; Harden 21'	Report	Polster (yellow card) 26'; Shipp 29'	Stadium: Avaya Stadium; Attendance: 18,000; Referee: Ricardo Salazar

Sunday, March 29, 2015 Match 4	Chicago Fire	1–0	Philadelphia Union	Bridgeview, Illinois
16:00	Adaílton 37'; Johnson (yellow card) 80'	Report	Carreiro (red card) 72'; Edu (yellow card) 90'	Stadium: Toyota Park; Attendance: 12,815; Referee: David Gantar

Saturday, April 4, 2015 Match 5	Chicago Fire	3–2	Toronto FC	Bridgeview, Illinois
14:00	Jones 14'; Adaílton (yellow card) 32'; Maloney 56'; Larentowicz 68'; Gehrig (yellow card) 73'	Report	Creavalle (yellow card) 5' (yellow-red card) 72'; Giovinco 20'; Cheyrou 54'; Morrow (yellow card) 90'	Stadium: Toyota Park; Attendance: 13,818; Referee: Juan Guzman

Friday, April 24, 2015 Match 6	Chicago Fire	1–0	New York City FC	Bridgeview, Illinois
19:00	Accam 20'; Watson (yellow card) 28'; Adaílton (yellow card) 90+3'	Report	Jacobson (red card) 24'; Brovsky (yellow card) 26'	Stadium: Toyota Park; Attendance: 19,124; Referee: Ricardo Salazar

Sunday, May 3, 2015 Match 7	Sporting Kansas City	1–0	Chicago Fire	Kansas City, Kansas
16:00	Sinovic (yellow card) 38'; Nagamura 75', (yellow card) 90+2'	Report	Adaílton (yellow card) 32'; Ritter (yellow card) 58'; Accam (red card) 89'	Stadium: Sporting Park; Attendance: 19,581; Referee: Jose Carlos Rivero

Saturday, May 9, 2015 Match 8	Chicago Fire	1–2	Real Salt Lake	Bridgeview, Illinois
14:00	Prado (yellow card) 32'; Polster (yellow card) 70'; Larentowicz 88' (pen.)	Report	Saborío 13'; Mulholland (yellow card) 27', (goal) 56'; Allen (yellow card) 50'	Stadium: Toyota Park; Attendance: 16,017; Referee: Drew Fischer

Friday, May 15, 2015 Match 9	New York City FC	2–2	Chicago Fire	New York City, New York
16:00	Allen (red card) 26'; Ballouchy 45+1'; Villa (yellow card) 45+3'; Facey (yellow card) 51'; Jacobson (yellow card) 71'; Shelton 90+1'	Report	Cocis 14'; Larentowicz 27' (pen.), (yellow card) 55'; Jones (yellow card) 61'; Maloney (yellow card) 63'	Stadium: Yankee Stadium; Attendance: 23,315; Referee: Ted Unkel

Friday, May 22, 2015 Match 10	Columbus Crew SC	2–2	Chicago Fire	Columbus, Ohio
16:00	Kamara 8', 55'; George (yellow card) 21'	Report	Gehrig (yellow card) 42'; Accam 58'; Johnson 90+4'	Stadium: Mapfre Stadium; Attendance: 13,118; Referee: Fotis Bazacos

Saturday, May 30, 2015 Match 11	Chicago Fire	3–0	Montreal Impact	Bridgeview, Illinois
19:30	Shipp 13'; Larentowicz 45' (pen.); Igboananike 72'	Report	Reo-Coker (yellow card) 3'; Donadel (yellow card) 23' (yellow-red card) 37'; Mallace (yellow card) 70'	Stadium: Toyota Park; Attendance: 15,256; Referee: Allen Chapman

Wednesday, June 3, 2015 Match 12	D.C. United	3–1	Chicago Fire	Washington, D.C.
18:00	Halsti (yellow card) 30'; Espíndola (yellow card) 57'; Arrieta 61', 69'; Doyle 75'	Report	Jones (yellow card) 24'; Accam 28'; Polster (yellow card) 58'	Stadium: Robert F. Kennedy Memorial Stadium; Attendance: 11,218; Referee: Edvin Jurisevic

Saturday, June 6, 2015 Match 13	Chicago Fire	2–3	Orlando City SC	Bridgeview, Illinois
19:30	Igboananike 9'; Accam 57'; Palmer (yellow card) 90+2'; Amarikwa (yellow card) 90+5'	Report	Collin (yellow card) 25'; Higuita (yellow card) 34'; Cerén (yellow card) 61'; Adaílton 40', 86' (o.g.); St. Ledger (yellow card) 64'; Larin 82'	Stadium: Toyota Park; Attendance: 20,124; Referee: Juan Guzman

Saturday, June 13, 2015 Match 14	New England Revolution	2–0	Chicago Fire	Foxborough, Massachusetts
18:30	Dorman (yellow card) 40'; Fagúndez 48'; Davies 50'; Woodberry (yellow card) 59'	Report	Adaílton (yellow card) 33'; Polster (yellow card) 43'; Igboananike (yellow card) 71'	Stadium: Gillette Stadium; Attendance: 15,775; Referee: Silviu Petrescu
Note: The match was rescheduled from April 15 to avoid a conflict with the USMNT vs. Mexico friendly

Wednesday, June 24, 2015 Match 15	Chicago Fire	0–1	D.C. United	Bridgeview, Illinois
19:30	Ritter (yellow card) 45'; Prado (yellow card) 79'	Report	Doyle 73'; Birnbaum (yellow card) 90'	Stadium: Toyota Park; Attendance: 11,833; Referee: Jorge Gonzalez

Friday, July 3, 2015 Match 16	Houston Dynamo	1–1	Chicago Fire	Houston, Texas
20:00	Alex 56'; Raúl Rodríguez (yellow card) 66'	Report	Lovel Palmer (yellow card) 38'; Guly (yellow card) 40'; Patrick Nyarko 72', (yellow card) 86'	Stadium: BBVA Compass Stadium; Attendance: 22,651; Referee: Elias Bazakos

Saturday, July 11, 2015 Match 17	Chicago Fire	1–0	Seattle Sounders FC	Bridgeview, Illinois
19:30	Răzvan Cociș (yellow card) 82'; Adaílton (yellow card) 84'; Jason Johnson 90+2'	Report	Andy Craven (yellow card) 80'	Stadium: Toyota Park; Attendance: 18,528; Referee: Allen Chapman

Wednesday, July 15, 2015 Match 18	Chicago Fire	0–1	Columbus Crew SC	Bridgeview, Illinois
19:30	Chris Ritter (yellow card) 46'; Eric Gehrig (yellow card) 63'; David Accam (yellow card) 90+5'	Report	Kei Kamara 41'; Chad Barson (yellow card) 77'; Steve Clark (yellow card) 90+3'	Stadium: Toyota Park; Attendance: 14,092; Referee: Ted Unkel

Friday, July 19, 2015 Match 19	Columbus Crew SC	3–1	Chicago Fire	Columbus, Ohio
16:00	Federico Higuaín 2' (pen.), (yellow card) 65'; Kei Kamara 17'; Tony Tchani (yellow card) 53'; Ethan Finlay 83'	Report	David Accam 9'; Jason Johnson (yellow card) 35' (yellow-red card) 50'; Adaílton (yellow card) 45+1'	Stadium: Mapfre Stadium; Attendance: 15,455; Referee: Chris Penso

Saturday, July 25, 2015 Match 20	Chicago Fire	2–2	New England Revolution	Bridgeview, Illinois
19:30	Shaun Maloney 44' (pen.); David Accam (yellow card) 61'; Harry Shipp (yellow card) 62'; Răzvan Cociș 75'; Eric Gehrig (yellow card) 81'	Report	Lee Nguyen 28'; Andrew Farrell (yellow card) 45+2'; Kelyn Rowe 77'; Chris Tierney (yellow card) 88'	Stadium: Toyota Park; Attendance: 14,159; Referee: Ricardo Salazar

Sunday, August 2, 2015 Match 21	Chicago Fire	2–0	FC Dallas	Bridgeview, Illinois
18:00	Accam 4'; Watson (red card) 79'; Maloney 85' (pen.)	Report	Díaz (yellow card) 35'; Akindele (yellow card) 48'; Acosta (yellow card) 76'	Stadium: Toyota Park; Attendance: 14,209; Referee: Jair Marrufo

Friday, August 7, 2015 Match 22	Portland Timbers	1–0	Chicago Fire	Portland, Oregon
22:00	Adi 48'; Melano (yellow card) 71'	Report	Matt Polster (yellow card) 44'	Stadium: Providence Park; Attendance: 21,144; Referee: Armando Villarreal

Sunday, August 16, 2015 Match 23	Philadelphia Union	3–3	Chicago Fire	Chester, Pennsylvania
18:00	Aristeguieta 21'; Alves 31'; Creavalle (yellow card) 34'; Barnetta (yellow card) 55'; Le Toux 90', (yellow card) 90+1'	Report	Igboananike 9', 90+2'; Nyarko 54', (yellow card) 70'	Stadium: PPL Park; Attendance: 17,608; Referee: Mark Geiger

Saturday, August 22, 2015 Match 24	Chicago Fire	0–1	Colorado Rapids	Bridgeview, Illinois
19:30	Larentowicz (yellow card) 35'; Nyarko (yellow card) 51'	Report	Serna 1'; Irwin (yellow card) 10'; Moor (yellow card) 82'; Torres (yellow card) 89'	Stadium: Toyota Park; Attendance: 18,317; Referee: Sorin Stoica

Wed., August 26, 2015 Match 25	Chicago Fire	3–2	New York Red Bulls	Bridgeview, Illinois
19:30	Igboananike 22', 73'; Nyarko 41'; Polster (yellow card) 70'	Report	Kljestan 10' (pen.); Lade (yellow card) 19'; McCarty (yellow card) 39'; Zubar 49'; Miazga (yellow card) 87'	Stadium: Toyota Park; Attendance: 11,196; Referee: Allen Chapman

Saturday, August 29, 2015 Match 26	Orlando City SC	1–1	Chicago Fire	Orlando, Florida
18:30	Boden (yellow card) 32'; Gehrig 37' (o.g.); Rivas (yellow card) 87'	Report	Accam 30'; Gehrig (yellow card) 43'; Igboananike (yellow card) 77'	Stadium: Orlando Citrus Bowl Stadium; Attendance: 28,921; Referee: Baldomero Toledo

Sat., September 5, 2015 Match 27	Montreal Impact	4–3	Chicago Fire	Montreal, Quebec
19:00	Tissot (yellow card) 24'; Drogba 27', 61', 65'; Lefèvre 42'; Bush (yellow card) 86'	Report	Larentowicz 36' (pen.); Júnior 44', (yellow card) 54'; Igboananike 59'	Stadium: Saputo Stadium; Attendance: 20,801; Referee: Silviu Petrescu

Friday, September 11, 2015 Match 28	New York Red Bulls	3–2	Chicago Fire	Harrison, New Jersey
18:00	Wright-Phillips 28', (yellow card) 81'; Grella 38'; Kljestan 71' (pen.)	Report	Larentowicz 14' (pen.); Accam 26'; Igboananike (yellow card) 51'; Polster (yellow card) 65'; Cyrus (yellow card) 74'; Harden (yellow card) 84'	Stadium: Red Bull Arena; Attendance: 17,184; Referee: Armando Villarreal

Sat., September 19, 2015 Match 29	Chicago Fire	0–1	Orlando City SC	Bridgeview, Illinois
19:30	Larentowicz (yellow card) 39'; Stephens (yellow card) 63'; Nyarko (yellow card) 79'	Report	Róchez 86'	Stadium: Toyota Park; Attendance: 20,280; Referee: Alan Kelly

Wed., September 23, 2015 Match 30	Montreal Impact	2–1	Chicago Fire	Montreal, Quebec
19:00	Drogba 39'; Ciman (yellow card) 58' (yellow-red card) 90+1'; Romero 76', (yellow card) 76'; Cabrera (yellow card) 86'	Report	Cocis (yellow card) 45+1'; Accam 50'; Polster (yellow card) 56'; Doody (yellow card) 80'; Harden (yellow card) 89'	Stadium: Stade Saputo; Attendance: 17,832; Referee: Fotis Bazakos
Note: The match was rescheduled from April 18 to allow Montreal Impact to prepare for the CCL Final

Sat., September 26, 2015 Match 31	Toronto FC	3–2	Chicago Fire	Toronto, Ontario
13:00	Giovinco 29', (yellow card) 69'; Bradley 59'; Altidore 79'	Report	Júnior 1', 52'	Stadium: BMO Field; Attendance: 22,513; Referee: Ismail Elfath

Saturday, October 3, 2015 Match 32	Chicago Fire	3–1	New England Revolution	Bridgeview, Illinois
19:30	Accam (yellow card) 43', (goal) 51'; Shipp 59', (yellow card) 65'; Larentowicz (yellow card) 62'; Júnior 86'; Stephens (yellow card) 89'	Report	Agudelo 31'; Bunbury (yellow card) 90'; Jones (yellow card) 90+6'	Stadium: Toyota Park; Attendance: 16,694; Referee: Kevin Stott

Sunday, October 18, 2015 Match 33	D.C. United	4–0	Chicago Fire	Washington, D.C.
13:00	Pontius 39'; Boswell 67'; Espíndola 71'; Saborío 80'	Report	Júnior (yellow card) 50'; Accam (yellow card) 77'	Stadium: Robert F. Kennedy Memorial Stadium; Attendance: 20,104; Referee: Sorin Stoica

Sunday, October 25, 2015 Match 34	Chicago Fire	1–2	New York Red Bulls	Bridgeview, Illinois
18:00	Polster (yellow card) 71'; Larentowicz (yellow card) 74'; Júnior 78'	Report	Wright-Phillips 8'; Kljestan 35' (pen.)	Stadium: Toyota Park; Attendance: 19,850; Referee: Ricardo Salazar

=== U.S. Open Cup ===
Kickoff times are in CDT (UTC-05)

June 16, 2015 Fourth round	Chicago Fire	1–0 (a.e.t.)	Louisville City FC	Bridgeview, Illinois
19:30	Matt Watson (yellow card) 20'; Chris Ritter (yellow card) 71'; Quincy Amarikwa 115'; Eric Gehrig (yellow card) 117'	Report; Video	Juan Guzman (yellow card) 90+4'	Stadium: Toyota Park; Attendance: 3,544

June 30, 2015 Round of 16	Chicago Fire	3–1	Charlotte Independence	Bridgeview, Illinois
19:30	Mike Magee 37', 82'; Lovel Palmer 50'	Report	Tomasz Zahorski 5'; Patrick Slogic (yellow card) 70'	Stadium: Toyota Park; Attendance: 3,617; Referee: Alex Chilowicz

July 22, 2015 Quarterfinals	Chicago Fire	3–1	Orlando City SC	Bridgeview, Illinois
19:30	Patrick Nyarko 3'; Kennedy Igboananike 87', 90', (yellow card) 89'	Report; Video	Rafael Ramos (yellow card) 15'; Cyle Larin 56', (yellow card) 80'	Stadium: Toyota Park; Attendance: 4,723; Referee: Edvin Jurisevic

August 11, 2015 Semifinals	Philadelphia Union	1–0	Chicago Fire	Chester, Pennsylvania
18:30	Fabinho (yellow card) 30'; Sébastien Le Toux 74'	Report	Mike Magee (yellow card) 83'; Răzvan Cociș (yellow card) 85'	Stadium: PPL Park; Referee: Juan Guzman

=== Friendlies ===
Kickoff times are in CDT (UTC-05)

March 10, 2015	Chicago Fire	1–0	University of Notre Dame	Bridgeview, Illinois
afternoon	Adaílton 19'	Report		Stadium: Toyota Park Training Field

== Leading scorers ==
MLS Regular Season
Rank	Scorer	Goals	Assists
1	(Ghana) David Accam	10	2
2	(Nigeria) Kennedy Igboananike	7	3
3	(United States) Jeff Larentowicz	6	0
4	(Brazil) Gilberto	5	2
5	(United States) Harry Shipp	3	8
6	(Ghana) Patrick Nyarko	3	4
7	(Scotland) Shaun Maloney	3	2
8	(Romania) Răzvan Cociș	2	3
9	(Jamaica) Jason Johnson	2	2
10	(Trinidad and Tobago) Joevin Jones	1	1
11	(Brazil) Adaílton	1	0
12	(United States) Michael Stephens	0	4
13	(United States) Mike Magee	0	2
14	(United States) Quincy Amarikwa	0	1
14	(United States) Patrick Doody	0	1
14	(United States) Eric Gehrig	0	1
14	(Jamaica) Lovel Palmer	0	1
14	(England) Matt Watson	0	1

U.S. Open Cup
Rank	Scorer	Goals	Assists
1	(Nigeria) Kennedy Igboananike	2	1
2	(United States) Mike Magee	2	0
3	(Jamaica) Lovel Palmer	1	1
3	(Ghana) Patrick Nyarko	1	1
5	(United States) Quincy Amarikwa	1	0
6	(Brazil) Guly do Prado	0	1
6	(United States) Jon Busch	0	1
6	(Trinidad and Tobago) Joevin Jones	0	1

All Competitions
Rank	Scorer	Goals	Assists
1	(Ghana) David Accam	10	2
2	(Nigeria) Kennedy Igboananike	9	4
3	(United States) Jeff Larentowicz	6	0
4	(Brazil) Gilberto	5	2
5	(Ghana) Patrick Nyarko	4	5
6	(United States) Harry Shipp	3	8
7	(Scotland) Shaun Maloney	3	2
8	(Romania) Răzvan Cociș	2	3
9	(United States) Mike Magee	2	2
9	(Jamaica) Jason Johnson	2	2
11	(Trinidad and Tobago) Joevin Jones	1	2
11	(Jamaica) Lovel Palmer	1	2
13	(United States) Quincy Amarikwa	1	1
14	(Brazil) Adaílton	1	0
15	(United States) Michael Stephens	0	4
16	(Brazil) Guly do Prado	0	1
16	(United States) Jon Busch	0	1
16	(United States) Eric Gehrig	0	1
16	(United States) Patrick Doody	0	1
16	(England) Matt Watson	0	1

Italics indicate player who departed the club during the season.
Updated to match played on October 25, 2015.
Source: MLSsoccer.com statistics - 2015 Chicago Fire

=== Appearances and goals ===
No.	Pos	Nat	Player	Total		MLS Regular season		MLS Cup Playoffs		U.S. Open Cup	
No.	Pos	Nat	Player	Apps	Goals	Apps	Goals	Apps	Goals	Apps	Goals
1	GK	(United States) USA	Alec Kann (on loan to Saint Louis FC)	1	-2	1+0	-2	0+0	0	0+0	0
2	DF	(United States) USA	Matt Polster	34	0	27+3	0	0+0	0	4+0	0
3	DF	(Trinidad and Tobago) TTO	Joevin Jones	31	1	26+2	1	0+0	0	3+0	0
4	DF	(Brazil) BRA	Adaílton	20	1	17+0	1	0+0	0	3+0	0
5	DF	(Jamaica) JAM	Lovel Palmer	24	1	20+2	0	0+0	0	2+0	1
6	DF	(United States) USA	Eric Gehrig	29	0	25+0	0	0+0	0	3+1	0
7	FW	(Jamaica) JAM	Jason Johnson	24	2	5+15	2	0+0	0	2+2	0
8	MF	(England) ENG	Matt Watson	16	0	8+5	0	0+0	0	3+0	0
9	FW	(United States) USA	Mike Magee	14	2	3+9	0	0+0	0	1+1	2
11	FW	(Ghana) GHA	David Accam	26	10	21+3	10	0+0	0	1+1	0
14	FW	(Ghana) GHA	Patrick Nyarko	21	4	14+5	3	0+0	0	1+1	1
16	DF	(United States) USA	Greg Cochrane	6	0	4+0	0	0+0	0	2+0	0
17	MF	(United States) USA	Collin Fernandez	1	0	0+1	0	0+0	0	0+0	0
18	GK	(United States) USA	Jon Busch	13	-25	12+0	-24	0+0	0	1+0	-1
19	MF	(United States) USA	Harry Shipp	37	3	29+4	3	0+0	0	4+0	0
20	DF	(United States) USA	Jeff Larentowicz	30	6	29+0	6	0+0	0	1+0	0
21	MF	(United States) USA	Chris Ritter	9	0	5+2	0	0+0	0	2+0	0
22	DF	(United States) USA	Patrick Doody	7	0	6+1	0	0+0	0	0+0	0
24	DF	(United States) USA	Ty Harden	3	0	3+0	0	0+0	0	0+0	0
25	GK	(United States) USA	Sean Johnson	32	-34	29+0	-32	0+0	0	3+0	-2
26	MF	(United States) USA	Michael Stephens	22	0	16+4	0	0+0	0	1+1	0
27	MF	(United States) USA	Kingsley Bryce	0	0	0+0	0	0+0	0	0+0	0
29	FW	(Brazil) BRA	Gilberto	11	5	8+2	5	0+0	0	1+0	0
30	MF	(Romania) ROU	Răzvan Cociș	29	2	22+4	2	0+0	0	2+1	0
55	DF	(Trinidad and Tobago) TTO	Daneil Cyrus	6	0	5+1	0	0+0	0	0+0	0
77	FW	(Nigeria) NGR	Kennedy Igboananike	34	9	20+11	7	0+0	0	1+2	2
Players who left the club during the season: (Statistics shown are the appearances made and goals scored while at Chicago Fire)
7	MF	(Brazil) BRA	Alex (traded)	1	0	0+1	0	0+0	0	0+0	0
10	MF	(Scotland) SCO	Shaun Maloney (transferred)	17	3	14+0	3	0+0	0	2+1	0
15	MF	(Spain) ESP	Víctor Pérez (loan ended)	1	0	0+1	0	0+0	0	0+0	0
23	FW	(Brazil) BRA	Guly do Prado (mutually parted ways)	16	0	6+9	0	0+0	0	0+1	0
24	FW	(United States) USA	Quincy Amarikwa (traded)	15	1	7+7	0	0+0	0	1+0	1

== Recognition ==
=== MLS Player of the Week ===
Week	Player	Report
5	(Scotland) Shaun Maloney	POTW

=== MLS Team of the Week ===
Week	Player	Position	Report
4	(United States) Harry Shipp	M	Report
5	(Trinidad and Tobago) Joevin Jones	D	Report
8	(Ghana) David Accam	F	Report
13	(Nigeria) Kennedy Igboananike	F	Report
22	(United States) Eric Gehrig	D	Report
22	(United States) Matt Polster	M	Report
24	(United States) Sean Johnson	GK	Report
26	(United States) Michael Stephens	M	Report
26	(Ghana) David Accam	F	Report
31	(United States) Harry Shipp	M	Report
31	(Brazil) Gilberto	F	Report

=== Team annual awards ===
Midfielder David Accam was named the Most Valuable Player, as well as was awarded the Golden Boot. In 23 matches this season Accam scored team-leading ten goals and added two assists.

First-year defender Eric Gehrig was named the Defensive Player of the Year.

David Accam was chosen Section 8 Chicago Supporters' Player of the Year.

Lovel Palmer's left-footed strike from over 30 yards in the U.S. Open Cup Round of 16 win over the Charlotte Independence was named the club's Goal of the Year.

== Kits ==
Home	Away

Type	Shirt	Shorts	Socks	First appearance / Info
Home	Red / Navy	Red	Red	
Away	White	White	White	

=== Primary kit ===
According to the league's bi-annual rotation of kits the primary kit carried over from the previous season. It was originally unveiled on March 4, 2014. The jersey design was inspired by the City of Chicago fire trucks which feature a dark top, a band and red throughout the bottom half. The light blue represents the primary color of the Chicago flag.

=== Secondary kit ===
On March 2, 2015 Chicago Fire unveiled the club's new secondary kit. The design and details were inspired by the City of Chicago flag.

== Draft pick trades ==
Picks acquired:

- 2016 MLS SuperDraft third round pick in exchange for goalkeeper Kyle Reynish

Picks traded:

- 2015 MLS SuperDraft conditional third round pick, 2014 MLS SuperDraft 8th overall pick and Jalil Anibaba to Seattle Sounders FC in exchange for Jhon Kennedy Hurtado and Patrick Ianni
- 2016 MLS SuperDraft conditional pick to Los Angeles Galaxy in exchange for Greg Cochrane
- 2016 MLS SuperDraft natural selection second round pick to Orlando City SC in exchange for Eric Gehrig
