= 2014 Chicago Fire season =

Chicago Fire
2014 season
- Chairman: Andrew Hauptman
- Head coach: Frank Yallop
- Stadium: Toyota Park (capacity: 20,000)
- MLS: 15th overall (9th in the Eastern Conference)
- MLS Cup Playoffs: Did not qualify
- U.S. Open Cup: Semifinals
- Brimstone Cup: Winners
- Top goalscorer: League: Quincy Amarikwa (8); All: Quincy Amarikwa (9)
- Highest home attendance: 18,776 vs Houston Dynamo (October 24)
- Lowest home attendance: 12,699 vs Philadelphia Union (April 5)
- Average home league attendance: 16,076 (regular season)
- Biggest win: RBNY 4-5 CHI (5/8)
- Biggest defeat: SJ 5-1 CHI (7/23)
| Home colors | Away colors |

The 2014 Chicago Fire season was the club's 16th year of existence, as well as their 17th season in Major League Soccer and their 17th consecutive year in the top-flight of American soccer.

Chicago Fire began the regular season on March 9, 2014, with an away match against Chivas USA. The Men in Red concluded the regular season on October 24, 2014, with a home match against Houston Dynamo. Chicago finished the season with a 6–10–18 record and missed the playoffs for the fourth time in the past five seasons. With 18 drawn matches, the Fire set a new MLS record for most ties in a season, beating the previous record of 16 ties set in 2011 by Chicago Fire and New York Red Bulls.

After 12 years with the team, midfielder Logan Pause retired at the end of the season. Pause spent all of his professional career playing for Chicago Fire. On November 3, 2014, he was named Vice President of the Chicago Fire Soccer Club.

== Squad at the end of the season ==
As of October 24, 2014. Source: Chicago Fire official roster

| No. | Name | Nationality | Position | Date of birth (aged) | Previous club |
Goalkeepers
| 25 | Sean Johnson | (United States) | GK | May 31, 1989 (aged 25) | (United States) Atlanta Blackhawks |
| 28 | Kyle Reynish | (United States) | GK | November 3, 1983 (aged 30) | (United States) New York Cosmos |
Defenders
| 3 | Hunter Jumper | (United States) | LB | February 28, 1989 (aged 25) | (United States) University of Virginia Cavaliers |
| 4 | Bakary Soumaré | (Mali) | CB | November 9, 1985 (aged 28) | (United States) Philadelphia Union |
| 5 | Lovel Palmer | (Jamaica) | RB | August 30, 1984 (aged 30) | (United States) Real Salt Lake |
| 6 | Patrick Ianni | (United States) | CB | June 15, 1985 (aged 29) | (United States) Seattle Sounders FC |
| 13 | Gonzalo Segares | (Costa Rica) | LB | October 13, 1982 (aged 32) | (Cyprus) Apollon Limassol |
| 16 | Greg Cochrane | (United States) | LB | November 11, 1990 (aged 23) | (United States) Los Angeles Galaxy |
| 18 | Steven Kinney | (United States) | RB | October 28, 1987 (aged 26) | (United States) Carolina Dynamo |
Midfielders
| 7 | Alex | (Brazil) | M | December 15, 1988 (aged 25) | (Switzerland) FC Wohlen |
| 8 | Grant Ward | (England) | M | December 5, 1994 (aged 19) | (England) Tottenham Hotspur |
| 11 | Sanna Nyassi | (The Gambia) | M | January 31, 1989 (aged 25) | (Canada) Montreal Impact |
| 12 | Logan Pause | (United States) | M | August 22, 1981 (aged 33) | (United States) University of North Carolina Tar Heels |
| 20 | Jeff Larentowicz | (United States) | M | August 5, 1983 (aged 31) | (United States) Colorado Rapids |
| 21 | Chris Ritter | (United States) | M | October 29, 1990 (aged 23) | (United States) Northwestern University Wildcats |
| 22 | Matt Watson | (England) | M | January 1, 1985 (aged 29) | (Canada) Vancouver Whitecaps FC |
| 30 | Răzvan Cociș | (Romania) | M | February 19, 1983 (aged 31) | (Ukraine) FC Hoverla Uzhhorod |
| 54 | Benji Joya | (United States) | M | September 22, 1993 (aged 21) | (Mexico) Santos Laguna |
Forwards
| 9 | Mike Magee | (United States) | F | September 2, 1984 (aged 30) | (United States) Los Angeles Galaxy |
| 14 | Patrick Nyarko | (Ghana) | F | January 15, 1986 (aged 28) | (United States) Virginia Tech Hokies |
| 15 | Matthew Fondy | (United States) | F | July 28, 1989 (aged 25) | (United States) Chivas USA |
| 19 | Harry Shipp | (United States) | F | November 7, 1991 (aged 22) | (United States) University of Notre Dame Fighting Irish |
| 24 | Quincy Amarikwa | (United States) | F | October 29, 1987 (aged 26) | (Canada) Toronto FC |
| 88 | Robert Earnshaw | (Wales) | F | November 6, 1981 (aged 32) | (England) Blackpool |
| 99 | Florent Sinama Pongolle | (France) | F | October 20, 1984 (aged 30) | (Russia) FC Rostov |

== Player movement ==
=== In ===
Per Major League Soccer and club policies terms of the deals do not get disclosed.

| Date | Player | Position | Previous club | Notes | Ref |
|---|---|---|---|---|---|
| December 13, 2013 | (Jamaica) Lovel Palmer | D | (United States) Real Salt Lake | Acquired in exchange for allocation money | |
| December 18, 2013 | (United States) Chris Rolfe | F | (United States) Chicago Fire | Re-signed with the club after initially having his contract option declined and later opting out of Stage Two of the 2013 MLS Re-Entry Draft | |
| January 6, 2014 | (United States) Kyle Reynish | GK | (United States) New York Cosmos | Signed via free transfer | |
| January 9, 2014 | (United States) Harry Shipp | F | (United States) University of Notre Dame Fighting Irish | Signed as a Homegrown Player | |
| January 13, 2014 | (United States) Chris Ritter | M | (United States) Northwestern University Wildcats | Signed as a Homegrown Player | |
| January 15, 2014 | (Colombia) Jhon Kennedy Hurtado | D | (United States) Seattle Sounders FC | Acquired together with the 13th overall selection in the 2014 MLS SuperDraft in exchange for Jalil Anibaba, the 8th overall selection in the 2014 MLS SuperDraft and a conditional third round selection in the 2015 MLS SuperDraft | |
| January 15, 2014 | (United States) Patrick Ianni | D | (United States) Seattle Sounders FC | Acquired together with the 13th overall selection in the 2014 MLS SuperDraft in exchange for Jalil Anibaba, the 8th overall selection in the 2014 MLS SuperDraft and a conditional third round selection in the 2015 MLS SuperDraft | |
| January 24, 2014 | (United States) Logan Pause | M | (United States) Chicago Fire | Re-signed with the club after having initially having his contract option declined and later opting out of Stage Two of the 2013 MLS Re-Entry Draft | |
| January 24, 2014 | (United States) Giuseppe Gentile | F | (United States) University of North Carolina Charlotte 49ers | Acquired via the Waiver Draft | |
| February 14, 2014 | (Israel) Orr Barouch | F | (Israel) Bnei Yehuda | Returned from loan | |
| February 25, 2014 | (United States) Marco Franco | D | (United States) University of California-Irvine Anteaters | Signed after being selected 13th overall (first round) in the 2014 MLS SuperDraft | |
| February 28, 2014 | (United States) Greg Cochrane | D | (United States) Los Angeles Galaxy | Traded for a conditional 2016 MLS SuperDraft pick | |
| March 5, 2014 | (England) Matt Watson | M | (Canada) Vancouver Whitecaps FC | Traded for a 2014 MLS International Roster Slot | |
| July 5, 2014 | (United States) Matthew Fondy | F | (United States) Chivas USA | Signed as a free agent | |
| July 14, 2014 | (Romania) Răzvan Cociș | M | (Ukraine) FC Hoverla Uzhhorod | Signed as a free agent | |
| July 29, 2014 | (The Gambia) Sanna Nyassi | M | (Canada) Montreal Impact | Acquired in exchange for Dilly Duka | |
| August 15, 2014 | (Wales) Robert Earnshaw | F | (England) Blackpool | Signed via free transfer | |
| August 28, 2014 | (United States) Collin Fernandez | M | (United States) Chicago Fire Academy | Signed as a Homegrown Player, will not be added to the first team roster until 2015 | |
| September 9, 2014 | (France) Florent Sinama Pongolle | F | (Russia) FC Rostov | Signed as a free agent | |

=== Out ===
| Date | Player | Position | Destination club | Notes | Ref |
|---|---|---|---|---|---|
| November 25, 2013 | (Uruguay) Arévalo Ríos | M | None | Contract option was not picked up | |
| November 25, 2013 | (Italy) Paolo Tornaghi | GK | None | Waived | |
| December 9, 2013 | (United States) Corben Bone | M | (United States) Philadelphia Union | 2014 contract option was declined; selected with the sixth pick in Stage One of the 2013 MLS Re-Entry Draft by Philadelphia Union | |
| December 9, 2013 | (Estonia) Joel Lindpere | M | None | 2014 contract option was declined | |
| December 9, 2013 | (United States) Daniel Paladini | M | (United States) Columbus Crew | 2014 contract option was declined; rights traded to Columbus Crew in exchange for the fourth round (61st overall) pick in the 2014 MLS SuperDraft | |
| December 9, 2013 | (Brazil) Maicon Santos | F | None | 2014 contract option was declined | |
| December 9, 2013 | (United States) Michael Videira | M | None | 2014 contract option was declined | |
| December 9, 2013 | (Jamaica) Shaun Francis | D | (United States) San Jose Earthquakes | Out of contract; selected in Stage Two of the 2013 MLS Re-Entry Draft by San Jose Earthquakes | |
| December 9, 2013 | (United States) Wells Thompson | M | None | Out of contract | |
| January 15, 2014 | (United States) Jalil Anibaba | D | (United States) Seattle Sounders FC | Traded together with the 8th overall selection in the 2014 MLS SuperDraft and a conditional third round selection in the 2015 MLS SuperDraft in exchange for Jhon Kennedy Hurtado, Patrick Ianni and the 13th overall selection in the 2014 MLS SuperDraft | |
| February 20, 2014 | (United States) Kellen Gulley | F | None | Returned from loan and was re-signed by the club after initially having his contract option declined, subsequently was waived in the preseason | |
| February 20, 2014 | (United States) Brendan King | M | None | Waived by the club | |
| February 24, 2014 | (Uruguay) Federico Puppo | F | (Ecuador) LDU Quito | After being out on loan since July 2012, a mutual agreement was reached to terminate the contract | |
| February 24, 2014 | (United States) Austin Berry | D | (United States) Philadelphia Union | Traded in exchange for allocation money | |
| March 6, 2014 | (Cameroon) Yazid Atouba | M | None | Re-signed with the club after being out of contract, subsequently was waived in the preseason | |
| April 2, 2014 | (United States) Chris Rolfe | F | (United States) D.C. United | Traded in exchange for allocation money | |
| June 11, 2014 | (Israel) Orr Barouch | F | None | The club and the player have mutually agreed to part ways | |
| June 30, 2014 | (United States) Giuseppe Gentile | F | None | Waived, after being loaned to Charlotte Eagles earlier in the season | |
| July 29, 2014 | (United States) Dilly Duka | M | (Canada) Montreal Impact | Traded in exchange for Sanna Nyassi | |
| August 22, 2014 | (Colombia) Jhon Kennedy Hurtado | D | (United States) Chivas USA | Traded in exchange for allocation money | |
| October 24, 2014 | (United States) Logan Pause | M | None | Retired | |

- Players selected in the 2014 MLS SuperDraft, but ultimately not signed by the club: midfielder Zach Bolden (selected 61st overall, fourth round, from University of Denver), midfielder Kadeem Dacres (selected 65th overall, fourth round, from University of Maryland, Baltimore County) and midfielder Bryan Ciesulka (selected 75th overall, fourth round, from Marquette University).
- Trialists released in the preseason: defender Rafael Alves, forward Vini Dantas, goalkeeper Kyle Renfro, defender Andrae Campbell, forward Daniel Jackson, midfielder Freddie Braun (winner of the Open Tryout), defender Tim Ward goalkeeper David Meves defender Parker Walsh and forward Grant Ward.

=== Loans ===
==== In ====
| Date | Player | Position | Loaned From | Notes | Ref |
|---|---|---|---|---|---|
| February 5, 2014 | (United States) Benji Joya | M | (Mexico) Santos Laguna | One year loan with transfer option | |
| March 22, 2014 | (England) Grant Ward | M | (England) Tottenham Hotspur | Acquired on loan | |

==== Out ====
Per Major League Soccer and club policies terms of the deals do not get disclosed.

| Date | Player | Position | Loaned To | Notes | Ref |
|---|---|---|---|---|---|
| July 9, 2013 | (Uruguay) Álvaro Fernández | M | (Uruguay) Nacional | Was initially loaned for the 2013 season; current status not yet announced by the club | |
| June 6, 2014 | (United States) Alec Kann | GK | (United States) Charlotte Eagles | Loaned for the rest of the season with the option to recall | |
| June 13, 2014 | (United States) Victor Pineda | M | (United States) Indy Eleven | Loaned with the option to recall | |
| July 3, 2014 | (Ecuador) Juan Luis Anangonó | F | (Ecuador) LDU Quito | Six-month loan | |
| September 12, 2014 | (United States) Marco Franco | D | (United States) Indy Eleven | Loaned through end of 2014 NASL season with option to recall | |

== Technical staff ==
| Position | Staff |
|---|---|
| Head Coach and Director of Soccer | (Canada) Frank Yallop |
| First Assistant Coach | (United States) C. J. Brown |
| Assistant Coach | (United States) Clint Mathis |
| Goalkeeping Coach | (England) Aron Hyde |
| Strength and Conditioning Coach | (France) Tony Jouaux |
| Technical Director | (United States) Brian Bliss |
| Head of Scouting | (England) Trevor James |
| Director of Soccer & Team Development | (United States) Paul Cadwell |
| Director of Team Operations | (United States) Ron Stern |
| Head Equipment Manager | (United States) Charles Raycroft |
| Assistant Equipment Manager | (United States) Allan Araujo |
| Head Athletic Trainer | (United States) Bo Leonard, MS, ATC, PES-NASM |
| Assistant Athletic Trainer | (United States) Steve Bagus, ATC, PES-NASM |
| Massage Therapist | (United States) Jake Bronowski, LMT |
| Team Medical Director | (United States) Dr. Gilberto Munoz |

Last updated: October 24, 2014
Source: Chicago Fire Technical Staff

== Standings ==
=== Conference tables ===
Eastern Conference

| Pos | Team | Pld | W | L | T | GF | GA | GD | Pts | Qualification |
|---|---|---|---|---|---|---|---|---|---|---|
| 1 | D.C. United | 34 | 17 | 9 | 8 | 52 | 37 | +15 | 59 | MLS Cup Conference Semifinals |
| 2 | New England Revolution | 34 | 17 | 13 | 4 | 51 | 37 | +14 | 55 | MLS Cup Conference Semifinals |
| 3 | Columbus Crew SC | 34 | 14 | 10 | 10 | 52 | 42 | +10 | 52 | MLS Cup Conference Semifinals |
| 4 | New York Red Bulls | 34 | 13 | 10 | 11 | 55 | 50 | +5 | 50 | MLS Cup Knockout round |
| 5 | Sporting Kansas City | 34 | 14 | 13 | 7 | 48 | 41 | +7 | 49 | MLS Cup Knockout round |
| 6 | Philadelphia Union | 34 | 10 | 12 | 12 | 51 | 51 | 0 | 42 | |
| 7 | Toronto FC | 34 | 11 | 15 | 8 | 44 | 54 | −10 | 41 | |
| 8 | Houston Dynamo | 34 | 11 | 17 | 6 | 39 | 58 | −19 | 39 | |
| 9 | Chicago Fire | 34 | 6 | 10 | 18 | 41 | 51 | −10 | 36 | |
| 10 | Montreal Impact | 34 | 6 | 18 | 10 | 38 | 58 | −20 | 28 | |

Source: MLS

Western Conference

| Pos | Team | Pld | W | L | T | GF | GA | GD | Pts | Qualification |
|---|---|---|---|---|---|---|---|---|---|---|
| 1 | Seattle Sounders FC | 34 | 20 | 10 | 4 | 65 | 50 | +15 | 64 | MLS Cup Conference Semifinals |
| 2 | LA Galaxy | 34 | 17 | 7 | 10 | 69 | 37 | +32 | 61 | MLS Cup Conference Semifinals |
| 3 | Real Salt Lake | 34 | 15 | 8 | 11 | 54 | 39 | +15 | 56 | MLS Cup Conference Semifinals |
| 4 | FC Dallas | 34 | 16 | 12 | 6 | 55 | 45 | +10 | 54 | MLS Cup Knockout round |
| 5 | Vancouver Whitecaps FC | 34 | 12 | 8 | 14 | 42 | 40 | +2 | 50 | MLS Cup Knockout round |
| 6 | Portland Timbers | 34 | 12 | 9 | 13 | 61 | 52 | +9 | 49 | |
| 7 | Chivas USA | 34 | 9 | 19 | 6 | 29 | 61 | −32 | 33 | |
| 8 | Colorado Rapids | 34 | 8 | 18 | 8 | 43 | 62 | −19 | 32 | |
| 9 | San Jose Earthquakes | 34 | 6 | 16 | 12 | 35 | 50 | −15 | 30 | |

Source: MLS

=== Overall table ===
| Pos | Team | Pld | W | L | T | GF | GA | GD | Pts | Qualification |
|---|---|---|---|---|---|---|---|---|---|---|
| 1 | Seattle Sounders FC (S) | 34 | 20 | 10 | 4 | 65 | 50 | +15 | 64 | CONCACAF Champions League |
| 2 | LA Galaxy (C) | 34 | 17 | 7 | 10 | 69 | 37 | +32 | 61 | CONCACAF Champions League |
| 3 | D.C. United | 34 | 17 | 9 | 8 | 52 | 37 | +15 | 59 | CONCACAF Champions League |
| 4 | Real Salt Lake | 34 | 15 | 8 | 11 | 54 | 39 | +15 | 56 | CONCACAF Champions League |
| 5 | New England Revolution | 34 | 17 | 13 | 4 | 51 | 46 | +5 | 55 | |
| 6 | FC Dallas | 34 | 16 | 12 | 6 | 55 | 45 | +10 | 54 | |
| 7 | Columbus Crew | 34 | 14 | 10 | 10 | 52 | 42 | +10 | 52 | |
| 8 | New York Red Bulls | 34 | 13 | 10 | 11 | 55 | 50 | +5 | 50 | |
| 9 | Vancouver Whitecaps FC | 34 | 12 | 8 | 14 | 42 | 40 | +2 | 50 | CONCACAF Champions League |
| 10 | Sporting Kansas City | 34 | 14 | 13 | 7 | 48 | 41 | +7 | 49 | |
| 11 | Portland Timbers | 34 | 12 | 9 | 13 | 61 | 52 | +9 | 49 | |
| 12 | Philadelphia Union | 34 | 10 | 12 | 12 | 51 | 51 | 0 | 42 | |
| 13 | Toronto FC | 34 | 11 | 15 | 8 | 44 | 54 | −10 | 41 | |
| 14 | Houston Dynamo | 34 | 11 | 17 | 6 | 39 | 58 | −19 | 39 | |
| 15 | Chicago Fire | 34 | 6 | 10 | 18 | 41 | 51 | −10 | 36 | |
| 16 | Chivas USA | 34 | 9 | 19 | 6 | 29 | 61 | −32 | 33 | |
| 17 | Colorado Rapids | 34 | 8 | 18 | 8 | 43 | 62 | −19 | 32 | |
| 18 | San Jose Earthquakes | 34 | 6 | 16 | 12 | 35 | 50 | −15 | 30 | |
| 19 | Montreal Impact | 34 | 6 | 18 | 10 | 38 | 58 | −20 | 28 | |

Source: MLS
Rules for classification: 1) points; 2) head-to-head record; 3) goal difference; 4) number of goals scored
(C) MLS Cup Champion; (S) Supporters' Shield

=== Results summary ===
| Overall | | | | | | | | Home | | | | | | Away | | | | | |
| Pld | Pts | W | L | T | GF | GA | GD | W | L | T | GF | GA | GD | W | L | T | GF | GA | GD |
|---|---|---|---|---|---|---|---|---|---|---|---|---|---|---|---|---|---|---|---|
| 34 | 36 | 6 | 10 | 18 | 41 | 51 | −10 | 4 | 2 | 11 | 22 | 20 | +2 | 2 | 8 | 7 | 19 | 31 | −12 |

Source: MLSsoccer.com standings
Pld = Matches played; Pts = Points; W = Matches won; T = Matches tied; L = Matches lost; GF = Goals for; GA = Goals against; GD = Goal difference

=== Results ===
| Round | 1 | 2 | 3 | 4 | 5 | 6 | 7 | 8 | 9 | 10 | 11 | 12 | 13 | 14 | 15 | 16 | 17 | 18 | 19 | 20 | 21 | 22 | 23 | 24 | 25 | 26 | 27 | 28 | 29 | 30 | 31 | 32 | 33 | 34 |
|---|---|---|---|---|---|---|---|---|---|---|---|---|---|---|---|---|---|---|---|---|---|---|---|---|---|---|---|---|---|---|---|---|---|---|
| Stadium | A | A | H | A | H | A | H | H | A | H | A | H | A | H | H | A | A | H | A | H | H | H | A | A | H | A | H | H | A | A | H | A | A | H |
| Result | L | T | T | T | T | T | T | L | W | W | L | T | T | L | T | T | W | T | L | T | T | W | L | T | W | L | T | T | L | T | T | L | L | W |

Updated to match(es) played on October 24, 2014. Source: MLS Results and Chicago Fire Schedule
A = Away; H = Home; W = Win; L = Loss; T = Tie

== Match results ==
Win Tie Loss

=== Preseason ===
Kickoff times are in CST (UTC-06)

| February 2, 2014 Preseason | Chicago Fire | 1–0 | Florida Gulf Coast University | Ave Maria, Florida |
| 10:00 | Kinney (yellow card) 25'; Jumper (red card) 26'; Gentile 40+' | Report; 80 min match (40+40) | (yellow card) 25' | Stadium: Ave Maria University |

| February 8, 2014 Preseason | Chicago Fire | 2–0 | D.C. United | Bradenton, Florida |
| 18:00 | Shipp 48'; Ward 80' | Report | Arnaud (yellow card) 39'; Doyle (yellow card) 86' | Stadium: IMG Academy |

| February 11, 2014 Preseason | Chicago Fire | 3–0 | Orlando City | Bradenton, Florida |
| 18:00 | Shipp 14'; Jackson 30'; Braun 78'; Gulley (yellow card) 90+' | Report | Turner (yellow card) 77' | Stadium: IMG Academy |

| February 12, 2014 Preseason | Chicago Fire | 1–0 | D.C. United | Bradenton, Florida |
| 9:00 | Joya 75'; Ward (yellow card) 85' | Report | Arnaud (yellow card) 35'; Porter (yellow card) 72' | Stadium: IMG Academy |

| February 19, 2014 Desert Diamond Cup | Colorado Rapids | 1–2 | Chicago Fire | Tucson, Arizona |
| 16:30 | Torres 68'; José Mari (yellow card) 75' | Report | Ward 37'; Amarikwa 40' | Stadium: North Stadium at Kino Sports Complex |

| February 22, 2014 Desert Diamond Cup | FC Tucson | 0–2 | Chicago Fire | Tucson, Arizona |
| 14:00 | | Report | Alex 19'; Soumaré 43' | Stadium: North Stadium at Kino Sports Complex |

| February 26, 2014 Desert Diamond Cup | New England Revolution | 1–0 | Chicago Fire | Tucson, Arizona |
| 16:30 | Rowe 90+1' | Report | Hurtado (yellow card) 34' | Stadium: North Stadium at Kino Sports Complex |

| March 1, 2014 Desert Diamond Cup | Chicago Fire | 2–0 | (Mexico) Chivas Rayadas | Tucson, Arizona |
| 19:30 | Anangonó 15'; Larentowicz (yellow card) 80'; Magee (yellow card) 88'; Amarikwa 90' | Report | E. Flores (yellow card) 18' | Stadium: Kino Veterans Memorial Stadium |

=== Major League Soccer ===
Kickoff times are in CDT (UTC-05)

| March 9, 2014 Match 1 | Chivas USA | 3–2 | Chicago Fire | Carson, California |
| 16:00 | Burling (yellow card) 40', (goal) 88'; Torres 56' (pen.); McNamara 59'; Bocanegra (yellow card) 77' | Report | Segares (yellow card) 55'; Duka (yellow card) 61'; Joya 64', (yellow card) 78'; Amarikwa 70' | Stadium: StubHub Center; Attendance: 8,320; Referee: William Anderson |

| March 16, 2014 Match 2 | Portland Timbers | 1–1 | Chicago Fire | Portland, Oregon |
| 14:00 | Fernández 79'; Paparatto (yellow card) 90+1' | Report | Larentowicz 19' (pen.); Soumaré (yellow card) 25'; Palmer (yellow card) 43'; Amarikwa (yellow card) 61'; Nyarko (yellow card) 73' (yellow-red card) 86' | Stadium: Providence Park; Attendance: 20,814; Referee: Marcos de Oliveira |

| March 23, 2014 Match 3 | Chicago Fire | 1–1 | New York Red Bulls | Bridgeview, Illinois |
| 14:00 | Larentowicz 6'; Magee (yellow card) 13' | Report | McCarty 21', (yellow card) 74'; Olave (yellow card) 30'; Eckersley (yellow card) 79'; Sekagya (yellow card) 85'; Cahill (yellow card) 90+1' | Stadium: Toyota Park; Attendance: 16,228; Referee: Drew Fischer |

| March 29, 2014 Match 4 | D.C. United | 2–2 | Chicago Fire | Washington, D.C. |
| 15:00 | DeLeon (yellow card) 22'; Espíndola 35'; Parke (yellow card) 56'; Kitchen 73' | Report | Hurtado 27'; Cochrane (yellow card) 58'; Amarikwa 82' | Stadium: Robert F. Kennedy Memorial Stadium; Attendance: 9,445; Referee: Jair Marrufo |

| April 5, 2014 Match 5 | Chicago Fire | 2–2 | Philadelphia Union | Bridgeview, Illinois |
| 16:00 | Magee 16'; Duka (yellow card) 64'; Anangonó 86'; Soumaré (yellow card) 88' | Report | Edu 32', (yellow card) 86'; Fernandes 39'; Bone (yellow card) 86' | Stadium: Toyota Park; Attendance: 12,699; Referee: Chris Penso |

| April 12, 2014 Match 6 | Montreal Impact | 1–1 | Chicago Fire | Montreal, Quebec |
| 15:00 | McInerney 43'; Camara (yellow card) 90+2' | Report | Nyarko (yellow card) 44'; Amarikwa 54'; Magee (yellow card) 66' | Stadium: Saputo Stadium; Attendance: 19,313; Referee: Jose Carlos Rivero |

| April 19, 2014 Match 7 | Chicago Fire | 1–1 | New England Revolution | Bridgeview, Illinois |
| 15:00 | Amarikwa 16', (yellow card) 34' (yellow-red card) 73' | Report | Nguyen 31' (pen.); Barnes (yellow card) 45+2'; Dorman (yellow card) 64'; Soares (yellow card) 87'; Alston (red card) 90' | Stadium: Toyota Park; Attendance: 15,743; Referee: Sorin Stoica |

| May 3, 2014 Match 8 | Chicago Fire | 2–3 | Real Salt Lake | Bridgeview, Illinois |
| 19:30 | Magee 22', (yellow card) 63'; Anangonó 30' | Report | Schuler (yellow card) 30'; Beckerman (yellow card) 44'; Plata 72', 93+'; Saborío 90' | Stadium: Toyota Park; Attendance: 14,903; Referee: Juan Guzman |

| May 10, 2014 Match 9 | New York Red Bulls | 4–5 | Chicago Fire | Harrison, New Jersey |
| 18:00 | Cahill 6', (yellow card) 90+3'; Wright-Phillips 39', 67', 78' (pen.) | Report | Shipp 4', 53', 58'; Amarikwa 49'; Nyarko 64' | Stadium: Red Bull Arena; Attendance: 23,776; Referee: Kevin Stott |

| May 18, 2014 Match 10 | Chicago Fire | 2–1 | Sporting Kansas City | Bridgeview, Illinois |
| 14:00 | Magee 6' (pen.), 15' (pen.), (yellow card) 90+1'; Hurtado (yellow card) 90+6' | Report | Palmer-Brown (yellow card) 49' (yellow-red card) 64'; Dwyer 68'; Feilhaber (yellow card) 82'; Ellis (yellow card) 90+4' | Stadium: Toyota Park; Attendance: 15,746; Referee: Jose Carlos Rivero |

| May 24, 2014 Match 11 | Columbus Crew | 2–0 | Chicago Fire | Columbus, Ohio |
| 18:30 | Finlay 10'; Arrieta 25'; Higuaín (yellow card) 54' | Report | Amarikwa (yellow card) 57'; Ianni (yellow card) 81' | Stadium: Columbus Crew Stadium; Attendance: 15,290; Referee: Fotis Bazakos |

| June 1, 2014 Match 12 | Chicago Fire | 1–1 | LA Galaxy | Bridgeview, Illinois |
| 15:00 | Hurtado (yellow card) 7'; Larentowicz 68' (pen.) | Report | Donovan 74', (yellow card) 76' | Stadium: Toyota Park; Attendance: 17,487; Referee: Hilario Grajeda |

| June 4, 2014 Match 13 | Colorado Rapids | 0–0 | Chicago Fire | Commerce City, Colorado |
| 20:00 | Watts (yellow card) 85' | Report | Joya (yellow card) 20'; Watson (yellow card) 78' | Stadium: Dick's Sporting Goods Park; Attendance: 13,402; Referee: Ricardo Salazar |

| June 7, 2014 Match 14 | Chicago Fire | 2–3 | Seattle Sounders FC | Bridgeview, Illinois |
| 19:30 | Ritter (yellow card) 8'; Hurtado (yellow card) 24' (yellow-red card) 37'; Shipp 41', 82'; Amarikwa (yellow card) 90+2' | Report | Martins (yellow card) 8', (goal) 31', 38' (pen.), (red card) 42'; Neagle 78'; Pineda (yellow card) 90+2'; Frei (yellow card) 90+3' | Stadium: Toyota Park; Attendance: 16,416; Referee: Chris Penso |

| July 2, 2014 Match 15 | Chicago Fire | 1–1 | Toronto FC | Bridgeview, Illinois |
| 19:30 | Amarikwa (yellow card) 45+2'; Shipp 56'; Palmer (yellow card) 86' | Report | Moore (red card) 29'; Jackson 42'; Caldwell (yellow card) 53' | Stadium: Toyota Park; Attendance: 13,153; Referee: Jorge Gonzalez |

| July 6, 2014 Match 16 | Sporting Kansas City | 1–1 | Chicago Fire | Kansas City, Kansas |
| 14:00 | Dwyer 33', (yellow card) 34'; Feilhaber (yellow card) 86' | Report | Magee 40'; Ritter (yellow card) 45'; Duka (yellow card) 54' | Stadium: Sporting Park; Attendance: 20,858; Referee: Alan Kelly |

| July 12, 2014 Match 17 | New England Revolution | 0–1 | Chicago Fire | Foxborough, Massachusetts |
| 18:30 | Kobayashi (yellow card) 23'; Gonçalves (yellow card) 63' | Report | Amarikwa 3'; Ianni (yellow card) 84'; Ward (yellow card) 90+2' | Stadium: Gillette Stadium; Attendance: 15,406; Referee: Jose Carlos Rivero |

| July 19, 2014 Match 18 | Chicago Fire | 1–1 | Philadelphia Union | Bridgeview, Illinois |
| 19:30 | Alex (yellow card) 26'; Larentowicz 60' | Report | Okugo (yellow card) 22'; Le Toux 90+1' (pen.) | Stadium: Toyota Park; Attendance: 17,460; Referee: Geoff Gamble |

| July 23, 2014 Match 19 | San Jose Earthquakes | 5–1 | Chicago Fire | Santa Clara, California |
| 22:00 | Stewart (yellow card) 32'; Salinas 45'; Harris 52'; Wondolowski 62'; Djaló 79'; Cato 84' | Report | Segares (yellow card) 67'; Ward 75'; Fondy 81' | Stadium: Buck Shaw Stadium; Attendance: 10,525; Referee: Dave Gantar |

| July 30, 2014 Match 20 | Chicago Fire | 0–0 | Vancouver Whitecaps FC | Bridgeview, Illinois |
| 19:30 | Ritter (yellow card) 28'; Palmer (yellow card) 69' | Report | Harvey (yellow card) 36'; Leverón (yellow card) 63' | Stadium: Toyota Park; Attendance: 13,532; Referee: Fotis Bazakos |

| August 2, 2014 Match 21 | Chicago Fire | 1–1 | Columbus Crew | Bridgeview, Illinois |
| 19:30 | Magee 37' (pen.); Segares (yellow card) 75' | Report | Higuaín 46'; González (yellow card) 50'; Francis (yellow card) 69' | Stadium: Toyota Park; Attendance: 14,332; Referee: Silviu Petrescu |

| August 10, 2014 Match 22 | Chicago Fire | 1–0 | New York Red Bulls | Bridgeview, Illinois |
| 19:00 | Magee 38' (pen.) | Report | Sekagya (yellow card) 66' | Stadium: Toyota Park; Attendance: 16,109; Referee: Ted Unkel |

| August 16, 2014 Match 23 | Montreal Impact | 1–0 | Chicago Fire | Montreal, Quebec |
| 17:30 | Larrea (yellow card) 70'; Vaio 84' | Report | Ianni (yellow card) 24' | Stadium: Saputo Stadium; Attendance: 17,132; Referee: Kevin Stott |

| August 23, 2014 Match 24 | Toronto FC | 2–2 | Chicago Fire | Toronto, Ontario |
| 18:00 | Soumaré 3' (o.g.); Warner (yellow card) 57'; Júnior 79' | Report | Palmer (yellow card) 20'; Lima (yellow card) 39'; Soumaré (yellow card) 46'; Earnshaw 70'; Amarikwa 90'; Segares (yellow card) 90+1' | Stadium: BMO Field; Attendance: 22,591; Referee: Daniel Fitzgerald |

| August 30, 2014 Match 25 | Chicago Fire | 1–0 | FC Dallas | Bridgeview, Illinois |
| 19:30 | Ward (yellow card) 10'; Soumaré (yellow card) 52'; Earnshaw 83'; Watson (yellow card) 90+5' | Report | | Stadium: Toyota Park; Attendance: 16,824; Referee: Marcos de Oliveira |

| September 7, 2014 Match 26 | New England Revolution | 2–1 | Chicago Fire | Foxborough, Massachusetts |
| 18:00 | Fagúndez 41'; Davies 60'; Barnes (yellow card) 74'; Caldwell (yellow card) 78'; Jones (yellow card) 78' | Report | Nyassi 28'; Palmer (yellow card) 36'; Cocis (yellow card) 39'; Watson (yellow card) 58' | Stadium: Gillette Stadium; Attendance: 12,204; Referee: Chris Penso |

| September 13, 2014 Match 27 | Chicago Fire | 1–1 | Toronto FC | Bridgeview, Illinois |
| 19:30 | Palmer 11'; Nyassi (yellow card) 41' | Report | Hagglund (yellow card) 47'; Morrow (yellow card) 62'; Rosario 89' | Stadium: Toyota Park; Attendance: 18,691; Referee: David Gantar |

| September 20, 2014 Match 28 | Chicago Fire | 3–3 | D.C. United | Bridgeview, Illinois |
| 19:30 | Amarikwa 16'; Larentowicz 32' (pen.); Cocis (yellow card) 45'; Watson 78'; Palmer (yellow card) 90+1' | Report | Kitchen (yellow card) 31'; Silva 39' (pen.), 54'; DeLeon (yellow card) 65'; Boswell 68' | Stadium: Toyota Park; Attendance: 17,279; Referee: Fotis Bazakos |

| September 28, 2014 Match 29 | Houston Dynamo | 2–0 | Chicago Fire | Houston, Texas |
| 14:00 | Clark (yellow card) 10'; Cummings 15'; Horst (yellow card) 21'; García 67' | Report | Segares (yellow card) 47'; Larentowicz (yellow card) 65' | Stadium: BBVA Compass Stadium; Attendance: 20,262; Referee: Jose Carlos Rivero |

| October 2, 2014 Match 30 | Philadelphia Union | 1–1 | Chicago Fire | Chester, Pennsylvania |
| 19:00 | Okugo 88' | Report | Palmer (yellow card) 5'; Nyarko (yellow card) 86'; Larentowicz (yellow card) 90+1'; Earnshaw 90+2' | Stadium: PPL Park; Attendance: 14,838; Referee: Chris Penso |

| October 5, 2014 Match 31 | Chicago Fire | 0–0 | Montreal Impact | Bridgeview, Illinois |
| 16:00 | Segares (yellow card) 88' | Report | Camara (yellow card) 65' | Stadium: Toyota Park; Attendance: 17,915; Referee: Mark Geiger |

| October 10, 2014 Match 32 | Sporting Kansas City | 2–0 | Chicago Fire | Kansas City, Kansas |
| 19:30 | Besler (yellow card) 71'; Zusi 80'; Dwyer 90+2' | Report | Watson (yellow card) 4'; Soumaré (yellow card) 60' | Stadium: Sporting Park; Attendance: 18,938; Referee: Kevin Stott |

| October 18, 2014 Match 33 | D.C. United | 2–1 | Chicago Fire | Washington, D.C. |
| 18:00 | Pontius 31'; Johnson 53' | Report | Shipp 67'; Ritter (yellow card) 90+2' | Stadium: Robert F. Kennedy Memorial Stadium; Attendance: 20,162; Referee: Armando Villarreal |

| October 24, 2014 Match 34 | Chicago Fire | 2–1 | Houston Dynamo | Bridgeview, Illinois |
| 19:00 | Lima (yellow card) 33'; Larentowicz 66' (pen.); Pause (yellow card) 70'; Pongolle 90+1' | Report | Cummings 18'; Davis (yellow card) 82'; Deric (yellow card) 82'; Cochran (yellow card) 85' | Stadium: Toyota Park; Attendance: 18,776; Referee: Allen Chapman |

=== U.S. Open Cup ===
Kickoff times are in CDT (UTC-05)

| June 18 Fourth round | Chicago Fire | 2–1 | Pittsburgh Riverhounds | Bridgeview, Illinois |
| 21:23 | Ward 22'; Magee 40' | Report | Marshall 42' | Stadium: Toyota Park; Attendance: 5,716; Referee: Alex Chilowicz |

| June 25 Fifth round | Chicago Fire | 4–2 (a.e.t.) | Columbus Crew | Bridgeview, Illinois |
| 19:30 | Ianni 34'; Pause (yellow card) 54'; Anangonó 83', 108'; Amarikwa 92'; Ward (yellow card) 118' | Report | Arrieta 55'; Añor 70'; Parkhurst (red card) 97' | Stadium: Toyota Park; Attendance: 5,124; Referee: Robert Sibiga |

| July 9 Quarterfinals | Atlanta Silverbacks | 1–3 | Chicago Fire | Atlanta, Georgia |
| 18:30 | Jesus Gonzalez (red card) 31'; Ferrety Sousa (yellow card) 43'; Deon McCaulay 54'; Ramiro Canovas (yellow card) 61' | Report | Mike Magee (red card) 31'; Matt Watson (yellow card) 34'; Quincy Amarikwa 50'; Jeff Larentowicz 82' (pen.); Alex 85'; Bakary Soumaré (yellow card) 86'; Jhon Kennedy Hurtado (yellow card) 90' | Stadium: Atlanta Silverbacks Park; Referee: Edvin Jurisevic |

| August 13 Semifinals | Seattle Sounders FC | 6–0 | Chicago Fire | Tukwila, Washington |
| 21:30 | Chad Barrett 6'; Andy Rose 33', 58'; Lamar Neagle (yellow card) 73'; Obafemi Martins 79'; Kenny Cooper 83', 84' | Report | Răzvan Cociș (yellow card) 17'; Lovel Palmer (yellow card) 55'; Bakary Soumaré (yellow card) 70'; Gonzalo Segares (yellow card) 82' | Stadium: Starfire Sports Complex; Attendance: 4,361; Referee: Jair Marrufo |

=== Friendlies ===
Kickoff times are in CDT (UTC-05)

| July 26, 2014 | Chicago Fire | 0–2 | (England) Tottenham Hotspur | Bridgeview, Illinois |
| 19:00 | | Report; Highlights | Harry Kane 5'; Aaron Lennon 83' | Stadium: Toyota Park |

== Statistics ==
=== Appearances and goals ===
| No. | Pos | Nat | Player | Total | | MLS Regular season | | U.S. Open Cup | |
| No. | Pos | Nat | Player | Apps | Goals | Apps | Goals | Apps | Goals |
|---|---|---|---|---|---|---|---|---|---|
| 1 | GK | (United States) USA | Alec Kann (on loan to Charlotte Eagles) | 0 | 0 | 0+0 | 0 | 0+0 | 0 |
| 3 | DF | (United States) USA | Hunter Jumper | 0 | 0 | 0+0 | 0 | 0+0 | 0 |
| 4 | DF | (Mali) MLI | Bakary Soumaré | 30 | 0 | 25+1 | 0 | 4+0 | 0 |
| 5 | DF | (Jamaica) JAM | Lovel Palmer | 32 | 1 | 29+1 | 1 | 1+1 | 0 |
| 6 | DF | (United States) USA | Patrick Ianni | 14 | 1 | 11+1 | 0 | 2+0 | 1 |
| 7 | MF | (Brazil) BRA | Alex | 31 | 1 | 24+4 | 0 | 1+2 | 1 |
| 8 | MF | (England) ENG | Grant Ward (on loan from Tottenham Hotspur) | 27 | 2 | 12+11 | 1 | 4+0 | 1 |
| 9 | FW | (United States) USA | Mike Magee | 20 | 8 | 17+0 | 7 | 3+0 | 1 |
| 11 | MF | (The Gambia) GAM | Sanna Nyassi | 10 | 1 | 6+4 | 1 | 0+0 | 0 |
| 12 | MF | (United States) USA | Logan Pause | 16 | 0 | 6+6 | 0 | 3+1 | 0 |
| 13 | DF | (Costa Rica) CRC | Gonzalo Segares | 22 | 0 | 20+1 | 0 | 1+0 | 0 |
| 14 | FW | (Ghana) GHA | Patrick Nyarko | 17 | 1 | 9+8 | 1 | 0+0 | 0 |
| 15 | FW | (United States) USA | Matthew Fondy | 10 | 0 | 0+8 | 0 | 0+2 | 0 |
| 16 | DF | (United States) USA | Greg Cochrane | 15 | 0 | 12+0 | 0 | 3+0 | 0 |
| 18 | DF | (United States) USA | Steven Kinney | 2 | 0 | 2+0 | 0 | 0+0 | 0 |
| 19 | FW | (United States) USA | Harry Shipp | 37 | 7 | 26+7 | 7 | 4+0 | 0 |
| 20 | MF | (United States) USA | Jeff Larentowicz | 37 | 7 | 33+0 | 6 | 4+0 | 1 |
| 21 | MF | (United States) USA | Chris Ritter | 11 | 0 | 8+2 | 0 | 0+1 | 0 |
| 22 | MF | (England) ENG | Matt Watson | 31 | 1 | 22+5 | 1 | 4+0 | 0 |
| 23 | DF | (United States) USA | Marco Franco (on loan to Orange County Blues) | 0 | 0 | 0+0 | 0 | 0+0 | 0 |
| 24 | FW | (United States) USA | Quincy Amarikwa | 36 | 10 | 29+3 | 8 | 4+0 | 2 |
| 25 | GK | (United States) USA | Sean Johnson | 37 | -59 | 33+0 | -49 | 4+0 | -10 |
| 27 | MF | (United States) USA | Victor Pineda (on loan to Indy Eleven) | 4 | 0 | 0+4 | 0 | 0+0 | 0 |
| 28 | GK | (United States) USA | Kyle Reynish | 1 | 0 | 1+0 | 0 | 0+0 | 0 |
| 30 | MF | (Romania) ROU | Razvan Cocis | 11 | 0 | 8+2 | 0 | 1+0 | 0 |
| 33 | FW | (Ecuador) ECU | Juan Luis Anangonó (on loan to LDU Quito) | 16 | 4 | 4+11 | 2 | 0+1 | 2 |
| 54 | MF | (United States) USA | Benji Joya (on loan from Santos Laguna) | 12 | 1 | 9+3 | 1 | 0+0 | 0 |
| 88 | FW | (Wales) WAL | Robert Earnshaw | 5 | 3 | 1+4 | 3 | 0+0 | 0 |
| 99 | FW | (France) FRA | Florent Sinama Pongolle | 7 | 1 | 4+3 | 1 | 0+0 | 0 |
Players who left the club during the season: (Statistics shown are the appearances made and goals scored while at Chicago Fire)
| 11 | MF | (United States) USA | Dilly Duka (traded) | 6 | 0 | 3+3 | 0 | 0+0 | 0 |
| 15 | FW | (Israel) ISR | Orr Barouch (contract terminated) | 0 | 0 | 0+0 | 0 | 0+0 | 0 |
| 17 | FW | (United States) USA | Chris Rolfe (traded) | 2 | 0 | 1+1 | 0 | 0+0 | 0 |
| 34 | DF | (Colombia) COL | Jhon Kennedy Hurtado (traded) | 21 | 1 | 19+0 | 1 | 1+1 | 0 |
| 92 | FW | (United States) USA | Giuseppe Gentile (waived) | 0 | 0 | 0+0 | 0 | 0+0 | 0 |

=== Leading scorers ===
MLS Regular Season
| Rank | Scorer | Goals | Assists |
|---|---|---|---|
| 1 | (United States) Quincy Amarikwa | 8 | 5 |
| 2 | (United States) Harry Shipp | 7 | 6 |
| 3 | (United States) Mike Magee | 7 | 4 |
| 4 | (United States) Jeff Larentowicz | 6 | 3 |
| 5 | (Wales) Robert Earnshaw | 3 | 0 |
| 6 | (Ecuador) Juan Luis Anangono | 2 | 0 |
| 7 | (Ghana) Patrick Nyarko | 1 | 3 |
| 8 | (England) Grant Ward | 1 | 2 |
| 9 | (The Gambia) Sanna Nyassi | 1 | 1 |
| 9 | (England) Matt Watson | 1 | 1 |
| 9 | (Jamaica) Lovel Palmer | 1 | 1 |
| 12 | (France) Florent Sinama Pongolle | 1 | 0 |
| 12 | (United States) Benji Joya | 1 | 0 |
| 12 | (Colombia) Jhon Kennedy Hurtado | 1 | 0 |
| 15 | (United States) Greg Cochrane | 0 | 2 |
| 16 | (Brazil) Alex | 0 | 1 |

U.S. Open Cup
| Rank | Scorer | Goals | Assists |
|---|---|---|---|
| 1 | (United States) Quincy Amarikwa | 2 | 1 |
| 2 | (Ecuador) Juan Luis Anangonó | 2 | 0 |
| 3 | (United States) Jeff Larentowicz | 1 | 1 |
| 3 | (Brazil) Alex | 1 | 1 |
| 5 | (United States) Patrick Ianni | 1 | 0 |
| 6 | (United States) Harry Shipp | 0 | 2 |
| 7 | (England) Matt Watson | 0 | 1 |

Updated to match played on October 24, 2014.
Source: MLSsoccer.com statistics - 2014 Chicago Fire

== Recognition ==
=== MLS Player of the Week ===
| Week | Player | Report |
|---|---|---|
| 10 | (United States) Harry Shipp | POTW |

=== MLS Team of the Week ===
| Week | Player | Position | Report |
|---|---|---|---|
| 2 | (Mali) Bakary Soumaré | D | Report |
| 10 | (United States) Harry Shipp | M | Report |
| 13 | (Mali) Bakary Soumaré | D | Report |
| 14 | (United States) Harry Shipp | M | Report |
| 17 | (United States) Sean Johnson | GK | Report |
| 18 | (United States) Sean Johnson | GK | Report |
| 18 | (Jamaica) Lovel Palmer | D | Report |
| 22 | (United States) Jeff Larentowicz | D | Report |
| 25 | (Mali) Bakary Soumaré | D | Report |
| 30 | (Jamaica) Lovel Palmer | D | Report |
| 33 | (United States) Sean Johnson | GK | Report |

=== Team annual awards ===
Forward Quincy Amarikwa won the Golden Boot award for scoring the team-leading eight goals this season. Goalkeeper Sean Johnson was named the Defensive Player of the Year for the second year in a row. Johnson was also named the team's Most Valuable Player. The winners were selected by the local media members.

First-year defender Lovel Palmer was voted Section 8 Chicago Supporters Player of the Year.

Patrick Nyarko's strike in the match against New York Red Bulls on May 10 was voted the team's 2014 Goal of the Year.

== Kits ==
| Home | Home Alt. | Away |

| Type | Shirt | Shorts | Socks | First appearance / Info |
|---|---|---|---|---|
| Home | Red / Navy | Red | Red | |
| Home Alt. | Red / Navy | Navy | Red | MLS, March 23 against New York |
| Away | Navy | Navy | Navy | |

=== Primary kit ===
The club unveiled its new 2014 primary kit on March 4, 2014. According to the release, the jersey design was inspired by the City of Chicago fire trucks which feature a dark top, a band and red throughout the bottom half. The light blue represents the primary color of the Chicago flag.

=== Third kit ===
On October 8, 2013, the club unveiled the third kit to be worn in the 2014 season. The municipal-themed design named "Heart on Your Sleeve" incorporated the city flag as well as the iconic Chicago skyline. The winning design was selected via a fan vote online.

== Miscellany ==
=== Draft pick trades ===
Picks acquired:

- 2014 MLS SuperDraft 13th overall pick, Jhon Kennedy Hurtado and Patrick Ianni from Seattle Sounders FC in exchange for Jalil Anibaba
- 2014 MLS SuperDraft fourth round pick from Real Salt Lake in exchange for Kwame Watson-Siriboe
- 2014 MLS SuperDraft fourth round pick from Columbus Crew in exchange for Daniel Paladini

Picks traded:

- 2014 MLS SuperDraft second round pick and allocation money to Philadelphia Union in exchange for defender Bakary Soumaré
- 2014 MLS SuperDraft third round pick to Toronto FC in exchange for Quincy Amarikwa
- 2014 MLS SuperDraft 8th overall pick, a 2015 MLS SuperDraft conditional third round pick and Jalil Anibaba to Seattle Sounders FC in exchange for Jhon Kennedy Hurtado and Patrick Ianni
- 2016 MLS SuperDraft conditional pick to Los Angeles Galaxy in exchange for Greg Cochrane
