= Harry Shipp =

American former soccer player

Personal information
- Full name: Harrison Shipp
- Date of birth: November 7, 1991 (age 35)
- Place of birth: Lake Forest, Illinois, United States
- Height: 1.75 m (5 ft 9 in)
- Position: Midfielder

Youth career
- 2009–2010: Chicago Fire

College career
Years	Team	Apps	(Gls)
2010–2013	Notre Dame Fighting Irish	84	(23)

Senior career*
Years	Team	Apps	(Gls)
2011–2013	Chicago Fire Premier	12	(4)
2014–2015	Chicago Fire	66	(10)
2016	Montreal Impact	27	(2)
2017–2020	Seattle Sounders FC	64	(10)
2017–2018	→ Seattle Sounders FC 2 (loan)	4	(0)
Total		180	(23)
- * Club domestic league appearances and goals as of June 16, 2020

Harrison "Harry" Shipp (born November 7, 1991) is an American former soccer player who last played as a midfielder for Seattle Sounders FC of Major League Soccer.

== Early life and college ==
Shipp was born in Lake Forest, Illinois, and attended Lake Forest High School. He played club soccer for the official youth soccer club of the Chicago Fire, The Chicago Fire Juniors North. Following high school, Shipp attended the University of Notre Dame and played four seasons there, scoring 23 goals and tallying 24 assists in 83 matches. He finished his collegiate career by helping lead Notre Dame to their first ever NCAA College Cup appearance and victory. Following the 2013 season, he was nominated for the prestigious MAC-Hermann Trophy, but eventually lost out to University of Maryland striker Patrick Mullins. Shipp did, however, win the 2013 Atlantic Coast Conference Men's Soccer Offensive Player of the Year award.

== Club career ==
Throughout Notre Dame's College Cup run, there was much discussion whether Shipp would be eligible for the MLS Superdraft, or could be signed to a homegrown contract by the Chicago Fire. After the Fire made a homegrown claim for his signature, some MLS clubs requested for the league to verify whether he was classified as a homegrown talent. After MLS confirmed his status as a homegrown player, the Fire signed Shipp to a homegrown deal, making him the third in the club's history after Victor Pineda and Kellen Gulley. He made his first appearance for Chicago by playing the full 90 minutes in an away match against Portland Timbers on March 16, 2014. On May 11, 2014, Shipp scored his first goal and his first professional hat trick for the Fire in a 5–4 away victory at New York Red Bulls. On June 7, 2014, Shipp scored two goals at Toyota Park in a losing effort against Seattle Sounders FC in which the final score was 3–2.

On February 13, 2016, Shipp was traded to Montreal Impact for general allocation and targeted allocation money.

On December 22, 2016, Montreal traded Shipp to newly crowned MLS Cup champion Seattle Sounders FC in exchange for allocation money. Shipp made his Sounders debut on March 11, 2017, when he started against his former team in a 2–2 draw against Montreal. Shipp scored his first Sounders goal in a 3–1 win over New York on March 19, 2017, redirecting a shot by Joevin Jones into the goal. He won a MLS Cup with Seattle in 2019 and was part of the team's midfield rotation during the regular season and playoffs. On June 16, 2020, Shipp announced his retirement from professional soccer to pursue an MBA at Northwestern University's Kellogg School of Management. He had been accepted to the program during the league's suspension for the COVID-19 pandemic but halted his announcement while serving as a team representative for the MLS is Back Tournament.

== Career statistics ==
As of June 2020

Club	Season	League			Cup (Note: Appearances in the Canadian Championship and U.S. Open Cup.)		Continental		Other		Total	
Club	Season	Division	Apps	Goals	Apps	Goals	Apps	Goals	Apps	Goals	Apps	Goals
Chicago Fire	2014	MLS	33	7	1	0	—				34	7
Chicago Fire	2015	MLS	33	3	4	0	—				37	3
Chicago Fire	Chicago total		66	10	5	0	—				71	10
Montreal Impact	2016	MLS	27	2	1	0	—		2 (Note: Appearances in the MLS Cup playoffs.)	0	30	2
Seattle Sounders FC	2017	MLS	18	2	1	0	—		3	0	22	2
Seattle Sounders FC	2018	MLS	19	3	2	1	3 (Note: Appearances in the CONCACAF Champions League.)	0	1	0	25	4
Seattle Sounders FC	2019	MLS	25	5	1	0	—		0	0	26	5
Seattle Sounders FC	2020	MLS	2	0	—		0	0	0	0	2	0
Seattle Sounders FC	Seattle total		64	10	4	1	3	0	4	0	75	11
Seattle Sounders FC 2 (loan)	2018	USL	4	0	—						4	0
Career totals			161	22	10	1	3	0	6	0	180	23

== Honors ==
=== Club ===
Seattle Sounders FC

- MLS Cup: 2019

=== Individual ===
- NCAA Division I Championship 2013
- ACC Offensive Player of the Year 2013
- First team All-America selection
- Finalist for both the MAC Hermann Trophy and the Senior CLASS Award
- Most Outstanding Offensive Player at the NCAA Championship
- Capital One Academic All-American of the Year for Men's Soccer
- NSCAA Scholar-All-America Player of the Year
- ACC Men's Scholar-Athlete of the Year award

== Family and personal life ==
Shipp is the oldest of four children born to his parents, Terry and Kathleen. His younger brother, Michael, played soccer with him at Notre Dame. At the end of 2016, Shipp proposed to his long-time girlfriend Maria Kosse, whom he met while at Notre Dame.

After retiring, Shipp enrolled in Northwestern University's Kellogg School of Management, where he received his Master of Business Administration in June 2022. Since then, Shipp works as a consultant for the Boston Consulting Group and lives in the Chicago metropolitan area.
