= Grant Ward =

English footballer (born 1994)

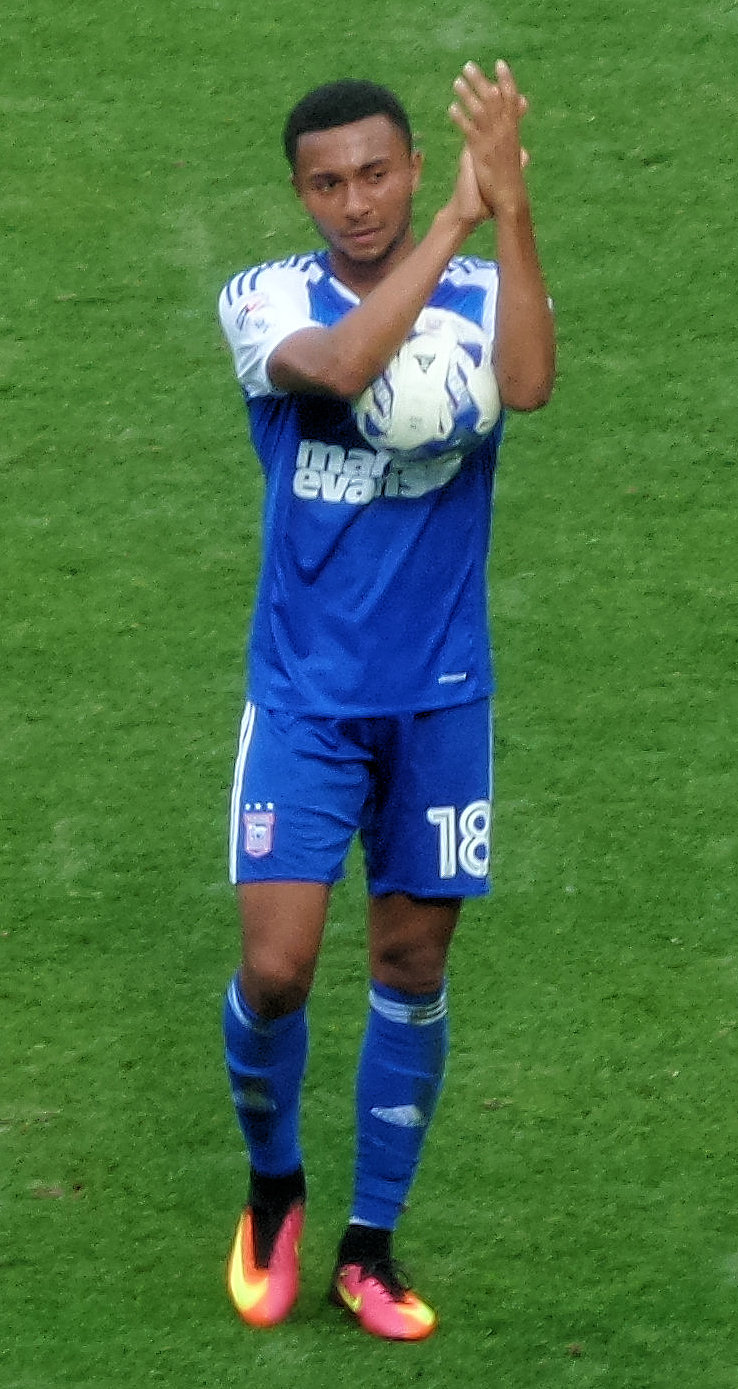
- Ward in 2016

Personal information
- Full name: Grant Anthony Ward
- Date of birth: 5 December 1994 (age 31)
- Place of birth: Lewisham, England
- Height: 5 ft 11 in (1.80 m)
- Positions: Central midfielder; right winger

Youth career
- 2011–2014: Tottenham Hotspur

Senior career*
Years	Team	Apps	(Gls)
2014–2016	Tottenham Hotspur	0	(0)
2014	→ Chicago Fire (loan)	23	(1)
2015	→ Coventry City (loan)	11	(0)
2015–2016	→ Rotherham United (loan)	40	(2)
2016–2019	Ipswich Town	94	(8)
2019–2022	Blackpool	45	(1)
2022–2023	Blackpool	2	(0)
2023–2025	Bristol Rovers	74	(3)
2026	Port Vale	5	(0)
- * Club domestic league appearances and goals as of 16:02, 2 May 2026 (UTC)

Grant Anthony Ward (born 5 December 1994) is an English professional footballer who plays as a central midfielder and right-winger.

Ward came through the Academy at Tottenham Hotspur, having loan spells away at Chicago Fire (United States), Coventry City, and Rotherham United. He played 43 games in the 2015–16 season and was named Rotherham United's Young Player of the Year. He was sold by Spurs to Ipswich Town for £600,000 in August 2016. He scored a hat-trick on his debut, scoring eight goals in 98 appearances over three seasons, before an ACL injury in December 2018 derailed his career. Released by Ipswich, he signed with Blackpool in December 2019. He achieved promotion out of League One with the club in the 2020–21 campaign, featuring in their play-off final victory. Injuries limited him to four Championship appearances the following season, and he was released, only to rejoin on a three-month contract in October 2022. He signed with Bristol Rovers in January 2023, playing 80 times in two-and-a-half seasons. He spent the first half of the 2025–26 campaign without a club before joining up with Port Vale.

== Early life ==
Ward was born in Lewisham, though he grew up in Kent after his parents split up. His elder brother, Jason, played non-League football for Grays Athletic.

== Club career ==
=== Tottenham Hotspur ===
Ward signed with the Tottenham Hotspur Academy in July 2011. During his time at Spurs, he progressed through the club's youth system. He appeared for their Under-18 side during the 2011–2012 season, scoring three goals in 16 starts and 10 substitute appearances, as well as featuring in three FA Youth Cup matches. He developed as an attacking left full-back during the 2012–13 season, making 17 appearances in the U18 Premier League, while also making three appearances in the FA Youth Cup and featuring twice in the NextGen Series. He signed a new two-and-a-half year contract in February 2016. He never made a first-team appearance in his five years at White Hart Lane.

==== Chicago Fire (loan) ====
Ward had a trial with Major League Soccer club Chicago Fire in February 2014 to try and impress head coach Frank Yallop, scoring twice in pre-season friendlies. On 22 March, he joined the Chicago Fire on loan. His debut was delayed due to an injury on his metatarsal that kept him out for three months. It took until 25 May, where he came on as a substitute for Dilly Duka in the 61st minute, as Chicago Fire won 2–0 versus Columbus Crew. His loan spell with Chicago Fire was extended until the end of the 2014 season. Ward scored his first Chicago Fire goal on 24 July, in a 5–1 loss to the San Jose Earthquakes at Toyota Park. In the last game of the season, Ward then provided two assists, in a 2–1 win over Houston Dynamo. He scored one goal and provided two assists in his 12 starts and 11 substitute MLS appearances. Chicago Fire attempted to sign him on loan again for the 2015 season.

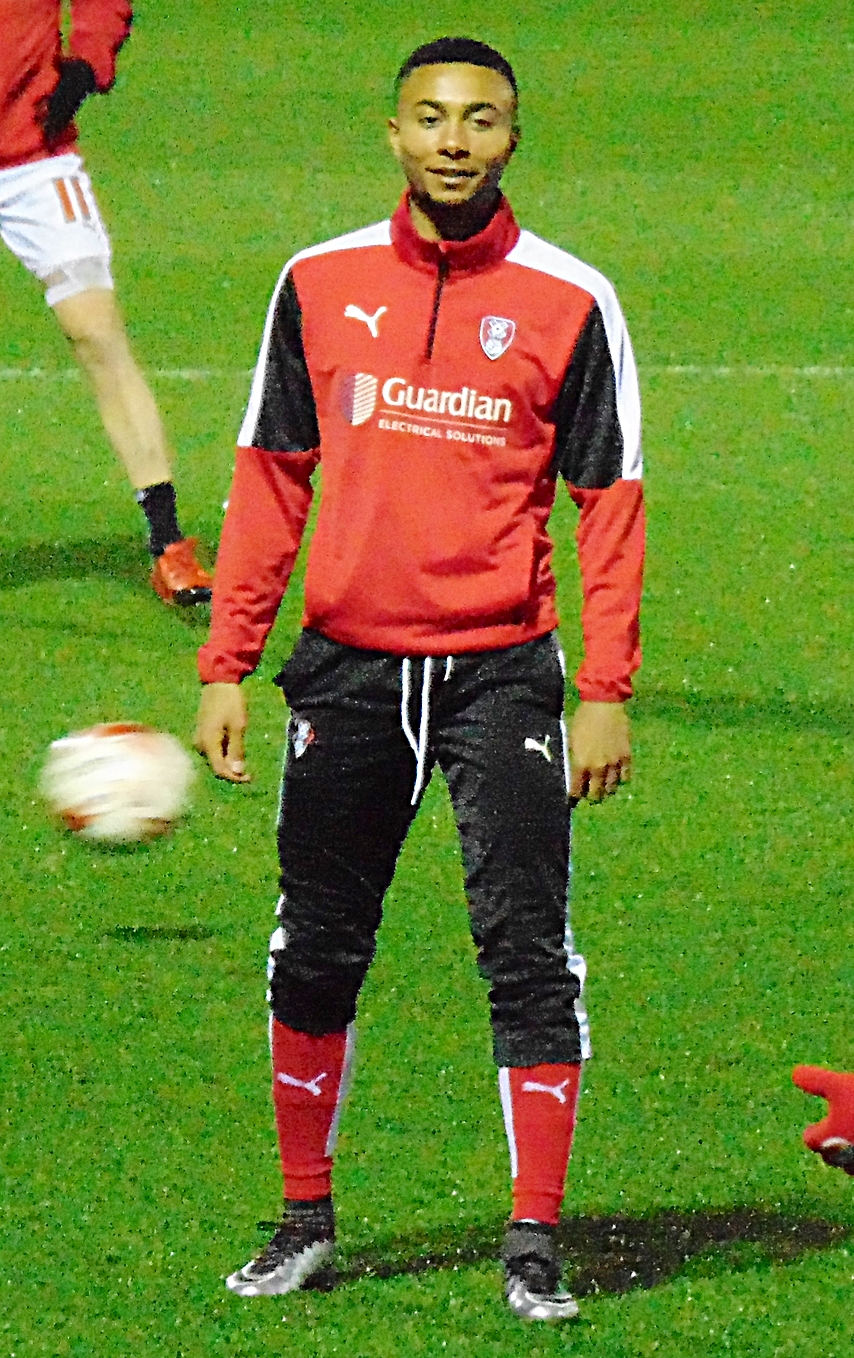
Ward warming-up for Rotherham United in 2016

==== Coventry City (loan) ====
On 11 March 2015, Ward began training with League One side Coventry City, and two days later joined them on a youth loan until the end of the 2014–15 season. Ward made his debut for the Sky Blues three days later against Chesterfield, where he assisted a goal for Sanmi Odelusi. The match ended in a 3–2 Coventry victory. Ward said he gained a winning mentality at the club after previously only experiencing youth football in England. Manager Tony Mowbray was keen to bring him back to the Ricoh Arena the following season, though felt Spurs would likely send him elsewhere.

==== Rotherham United (loan) ====
Ward began training with Championship club Rotherham United at the start of the 2015–16 season. He joined Rotherham on a six-month loan deal on 13 July. Manager Steve Evans said that Ward had chosen Rotherham ahead of "several Championship options". Ward made his debut at the New York Stadium on the opening game of the season, as the Millers lost 4–1 to Milton Keynes Dons. He scored his first goal for the club in a 2–1 loss to Burnley on 2 October. After having his loan type changed by Rotherham manager Neil Redfearn from an initial youth loan to a senior loan to cover for injuries in the squad, Ward then scored his second goal for the club in a 4–0 Boxing Day win over Bolton Wanderers. After extending his loan spell for the rest of the season, Ward was a key player as the club managed to avoid relegation under the stewardship of Neil Warnock, playing 43 times in total. Ward won both the club's Young Player of the Year and Goal of the Year awards.

=== Ipswich Town ===
On 1 August 2016, Ward joined Championship club Ipswich Town for an undisclosed fee, signing a three-year deal with the option of a further 12 months. The fee was reported to be around £600,000. Ward was previously linked with a move back to Rotherham United before opting to join Ipswich Town instead. He scored a 39 minute hat-trick on his Blues debut after coming on as a second-half substitute in an opening day 4–2 win over Barnsley at Portman Road. Three weeks later, on 27 August, Ward scored the only goal in a 1–0 win over Preston North End. He scored again on 26 November, in a 3–0 win over Queens Park Rangers. He was overshadowed by loanee Tom Lawrence, but still made 46 appearances in all competitions during the 2016–17 season, scoring six goals in total. He looked to be a confident winger, comfortable on the ball, who linked up well with his teammates.

Ward scored his first goal of the 2017–18 season on 26 September, netting the final goal in a 5–2 home win over Sunderland after getting the better of Bryan Oviedo all night. He scored a goal and gave away a penalty playing at right-wing-back under caretaker boss Bryan Klug in April, following the departure of Mick McCarthy, and said "I think Mick's left the team in a good place". He ended the campaign on a straight red card following a high tackle on Aston Villa left-back Neil Taylor. He made a total of 37 appearances over the course of the season, scoring two goals. Of these, 25 were Championship starts, 10 fewer than the previous campaign, playing wide right and occasionally part of a central midfield three as he struggled for consistency. He remained a regular in the first team under new manager Paul Hurst, though was dropped completely after Paul Lambert took charge midway through the 2018–19 campaign. On 26 December, Ward suffered an Anterior cruciate ligament injury (ACL) during a 3–0 loss at Queens Park Rangers, which ruled him out of playing for nine months. This proved to be his last appearance for the club and although he was released at the end of the season, he remained at the club while he recovered from injury.

=== Blackpool ===
On 28 December 2019, Ward joined League One club Blackpool on an 18-month contract, with the option of an additional year. He chose the club ahead of Rotherham United, who had offered to make him one of their highest-paid players. He was dropped from the Blackpool first-team after manager Simon Grayson was sacked on 12 February, having seen little of the ball whilst operating in the number ten position. He was limited to seven appearances by the end of the 2019–20 campaign. He featured 44 times during the 2020–21 promotion season, though missed the play-off semi-finals due to a calf injury. He featured in the play-off final at Wembley Stadium, coming on as a late substitute to help Blackpool to retain their 2–1 lead over Lincoln City and secure promotion to the Championship. The club took up the 12-month extension option in his contract. He played his best football for the club as part of a midfield two in a 4–4–2 formation.

Ward suffered an Achilles tendon injury in August 2021, which required surgery and a lengthy time off. Manager Neil Critchley stated that "he's a really reliable performer and we will miss him badly". Ward worked on his coaching badges and helped with coaching the youth teams during his time out injured. He was released by the club at the end of the 2021–22 season. He appeared as a trialist for Blackpool during pre-season friendlies, having been on trial with Reading. Manager Michael Appleton said it was an opportunity for the player to prove his fitness and win a contract. On 21 October, he rejoined Blackpool on a three-month contract after Seasiders midfielder Kevin Stewart picked up a serious injury. He featured as an emergency right-back against Middlesbrough before disappearing from matchday squads at Bloomfield Road, with manager Michael Appleton confirming he would leave at the end of his contract. He was released on 21 January 2023.

=== Bristol Rovers ===
On 27 January 2023, Ward signed for League One club Bristol Rovers. Manager Joey Barton said he was a "quality addition" with a great deal of experience. Ward made his debut the following day as a substitute in a 5–1 defeat at Morecambe. On 10 April, he scored his first goal for the club with the winner in a 2–1 victory over Fleetwood Town, his cross flying over the goalkeeper's head and finding the top corner. Having only signed a short-term contract until the end of the 2022–23 season, he was reportedly receiving interest from other clubs with a new contract offer from Rovers also on the table. He was officially offered a contract at the end of the season.

He signed a new two-year contract at the Memorial Stadium in June 2023. Injury issues once again returned for Ward during the 2023–24 season, as he made just three appearances across three months from late August to late November before another injury suffered in early January ruled him out until March. Interim manager Andy Mangan had spoken how he had been careful not to rush him back too soon. Ward proved to be an integral player under new manager Matt Taylor at the start of the 2024–25 season. On 5 October, he provided two assists and scored one goal in a 3–1 victory at Burton Albion to claim the League One Player of the Week award and a place on the EFL Team of the Week. However, he faced more injury issues during Iñigo Calderón's time in charge. Following relegation into League Two, Ward was released at the end of the season.

=== Port Vale ===
On 9 February 2026, Ward joined League One bottom-club Port Vale on a short-term deal until the end of the 2025–26 season. Manager Jon Brady said he would offer "quality and versatility in the midfield". He was limited to three league starts as the club were relegated in 22nd place. He was released upon the expiry of his contract.

Ward had a trial with Northampton Town in July 2026.

== Style of play ==
Primarily a winger in his early career, Ward can play all across the midfield. He has good levels of professionalism, athleticism and technique. Speaking in 2016, he described himself as "very quick and athletic, box-to-box, I like to take people on.... I like to get people off their seats". Conversely, five years later, Blackpool manager Neil Critchley praised him as an "unsung hero" in central midfield "with the amount of coverage he makes all over the pitch, picking up first balls and second balls, he allows you to get a foothold in the game". Ward struggled with injuries throughout his career and found goals hard to come by.

== Career statistics ==
As of match played 2 May 2026

Appearances and goals by club, season and competition
Club	Season	League			National cup (Note: Includes U.S. Open Cup, FA Cup)		League cup (Note: Includes EFL Cup)		Other		Total	
Club	Season	Division	Apps	Goals	Apps	Goals	Apps	Goals	Apps	Goals	Apps	Goals
Chicago Fire (loan)	2014	Major League Soccer	23	1	4	1	—		—		27	2
Coventry City (loan)	2014–15	League One	11	0	—		—		—		11	0
Rotherham United (loan)	2015–16	Championship	40	2	1	0	2	0	—		43	2
Ipswich Town	2016–17	Championship	43	6	2	0	1	0	—		46	6
Ipswich Town	2017–18	Championship	37	2	0	0	0	0	—		37	2
Ipswich Town	2018–19	Championship	14	0	0	0	1	0	—		15	0
Ipswich Town	Total		94	8	2	0	2	0	0	0	98	8
Blackpool	2019–20	League One	5	0	2	0	—		—		7	0
Blackpool	2020–21	League One	36	1	3	1	1	0	4 (Note: Three appearances in EFL Trophy, one appearance in EFL League One play-offs)	0	44	2
Blackpool	2021–22	Championship	4	0	0	0	1	0	—		5	0
Blackpool	2022–23	Championship	2	0	0	0	0	0	—		2	0
Blackpool	Total		47	1	5	1	2	0	4	0	58	2
Bristol Rovers	2022–23	League One	19	1	—		—		—		19	1
Bristol Rovers	2023–24	League One	20	1	2	1	1	0	0	0	23	2
Bristol Rovers	2024–25	League One	35	1	3	1	0	0	0	0	38	2
Bristol Rovers	Total		74	3	5	2	1	0	0	0	80	5
Port Vale	2025–26	League One	5	0	2	0	—		1 (Note: Appearance in EFL Trophy)	0	8	0
Career total			294	15	19	4	7	0	5	0	325	19

== Honours ==
Blackpool

- EFL League One play-offs: 2021

Individual

- Rotherham United Young Player of the Year: 2015–16
- Rotherham United Goal of the Season: 2015–16: vs Burnley
