= Bakary Soumaré =

Malian footballer (born 1985)

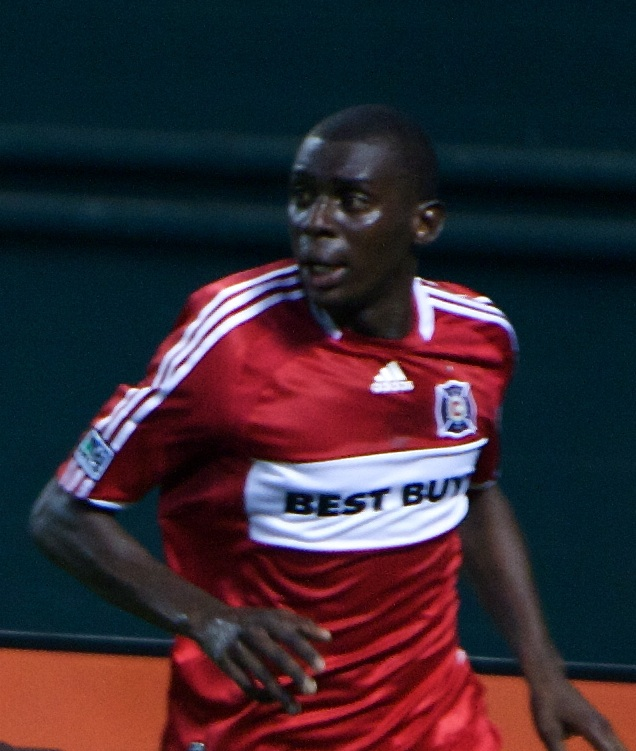
- Soumaré with Chicago Fire in December 2008

Personal information
- Date of birth: 9 November 1985 (age 41)
- Place of birth: Bamako, Mali
- Height: 1.93 m (6 ft 4 in)
- Position: Defender

Youth career
- 2002–2005: La Salle Cardinals

College career
Years	Team	Apps	(Gls)
2005–2006	Virginia Cavaliers		

Senior career*
Years	Team	Apps	(Gls)
2007–2009	Chicago Fire	63	(0)
2009–2012	Boulogne	67	(2)
2012	→ Karlsruher SC (loan)	7	(0)
2012–2013	Philadelphia Union	4	(0)
2013–2014	Chicago Fire	48	(1)
2015	Montreal Impact	10	(0)
2015	FC Dallas	0	(0)
Total		199	(3)

International career
2009–2010	Mali	12	(0)
- * Club domestic league appearances and goals

Bakary Soumaré (born 9 November 1985) is a Malian former professional footballer who played as a defender. He played professionally in the United States, France, Germany and Canada, and earned twelve caps for the Mali national team.

== Early life ==
Born in Bamako, Mali, Soumaré moved as a two-year-old to France with this family, growing up in Saint-Denis, a suburb of Paris. At sixteen he left France for New York City where he attended the Catholic high school La Salle Academy for four years, eventually earning a degree. Through an athletic scholarship he was then able to go to the University of Virginia where he stayed for three semesters until he was drafted into MLS.

== Club career ==
=== Chicago Fire ===
Soumaré was drafted 2nd overall by the Chicago Fire in the 2007 MLS SuperDraft. After appearing on a substitute bench several times, Soumaré made his debut, coming on for Brian Plotkin, in a 0–0 draw against Real Salt Lake on 27 May 2007; on 1 July 2007, Soumaré received a straight red card for a violent conduct in a 0–0 draw against Colorado Rapids.

He since established himself in the first team. During the 2008 season, Soumaré scored an own goal against the team, which he played his first game against, in a 1–1 draw on the opening game of the season. Despite this, he was later nominated for the MLS Defender of the Year award, alongside Jimmy Conrad and eventual winner Chad Marshall. On 31 May 2009, Soumaré's aggressive on-field play continued as he received a red card after a second bookable offence in a 3–0 loss against Dallas. In August 2009, Soumaré was fined for being involved in a fight with manager Denis Hamlett during the half-time interval of their game against Houston Dynamo.

=== France ===
In August 2009, Soumaré joined French club US Boulogne on a four-year contract, for a reported fee of $2.200.000 Soumaré made his debut for the club on 19 August 2009, in a 2–0 loss against Ligue 1 champion Bordeaux. On 20 March 2010, Soumaré received a straight red card in a 3–0 loss against Paris Saint-Germain. At the end of the season Boulogne was relegated to Ligue 2 while Soumaré was promoted as captain ahead of the new season. Soumaré scored his first goal of his career in a 1–0 win over Reims on 29 October 2010; his second came on his last game of the season in a 3–2 win over Tours on 22 April 2011. A clause in his contract allowed him to go on a loan when Boulogne got relegated. Boulogne loaned Soumaré out for a fee of €500,000. In total, Soumaré made 65 league appearances for Boulogne.

=== Germany ===
In January 2012, Soumaré signed for German club Karlsruher SC on loan until the end of the 2011–12 season, having previously linked with 2. Bundesliga side Fortuna Düsseldorf and Ingolstadt 04. Soumaré made his debut on 5 February in a 2–1 win over Erzgebirge Aue. However, his season got cut short due to a knee injury.

=== Philadelphia Union ===
Soumaré returned to Major League Soccer when he signed with Philadelphia Union on 26 June 2012. Philadelphia traded with Vancouver Whitecaps FC to move up in the MLS Allocation Order and gain the right to sign Soumaré. Bakary made his first return in MLS since leaving Chicago Fire, in a 3–1 loss against his former club on 13 August 2012. In September 2012 he had an exploratory follow-up to the major knee surgery he underwent in April 2012.

=== Return to Chicago ===
After playing back-to-back games against his old club, Philadelphia traded Soumaré back to Chicago Fire on 23 May 2013 in exchange for allocation money and a second-round pick in the 2014 MLS SuperDraft.

=== Montreal Impact ===
Soumaré's second stint in Chicago was not as successful as his first and the club declined his 2015 contract option at the conclusion of the 2014 season. In December 2014, Soumaré entered the 2014 MLS Re-Entry Draft and was selected in stage two by Montreal Impact. He officially signed with the Impact on 6 January 2015. He asked to leave the club in July 2015.

=== FC Dallas ===
In July 2015, Soumaré was traded to FC Dallas in exchange for Kyle Bekker.

== International ==
Soumaré had expressed a desire to represent the United States at international level once he would become an American citizen. At the time of the announcement, he believed he would have his citizenship by sometime in 2009. After that was not possible, Soumaré declared himself for Mali, making his debut in 2009. In the Africa Cup of Nations, Soumaré was in a squad and made two appearances, playing 90 minutes and receiving a yellow card, resulting in a miss for one game.

== Personal life ==
Soumaré is a triple citizen of Mali, France and the United States.

== Career statistics ==
=== Club ===
Appearances and goals by club, season and competition
Club	Season	League			Cup		League Cup		Continental		Total	
Club	Season	Division	Apps	Goals	Apps	Goals	Apps	Goals	Apps	Goals	Apps	Goals
Chicago Fire	2007	Major League Soccer	19	0	1	0	1	0	–		21	0
Chicago Fire	2008	Major League Soccer	28	0	2	0	3	0	–		33	0
Chicago Fire	2009	Major League Soccer	16	0	1	0	0	0	–		17	0
Chicago Fire	Total		63	0	4	0	4	0	0	0	71	0
Boulogne	2009–10	Ligue 1	20	0	2	0	1	0	–		23	0
Boulogne	2010–11	Ligue 2	31	2	2	0	4	0	–		37	2
Boulogne	2011–12	Ligue 2	16	0	0	0	1	0	–		17	0
Boulogne	Total		67	2	4	0	6	0	0	0	77	2
Karlsruher SC (loan)	2011–12	2. Bundesliga	7	0	0	0	0	0	–		7	0
Philadelphia Union	2012	Major League Soccer	1	0	0	0	0	0	–		1	0
Philadelphia Union	2013	Major League Soccer	3	0	–		–		–		3	0
Philadelphia Union	Total		4	0	0	0	0	0	0	0	4	0
Chicago Fire	2013	Major League Soccer	22	0	4	0	–		–		26	0
Chicago Fire	2014	Major League Soccer	26	0	4	0	–		–		30	0
Chicago Fire	Total		48	0	8	0	0	0	0	0	56	0
Montreal Impact	2015	Major League Soccer	10	0	0	0	–		6	0	16	0
FC Dallas	2015	Major League Soccer	0	0	–		0	0	–		0	0
Career total			199	2	16	0	10	0	6	0	231	2

== Honors ==
Individual

- MLS Best XI: 2008
