= Chris Ritter =

American soccer player

Personal information
- Full name: Christopher Jay Ritter
- Date of birth: October 29, 1990 (age 35)
- Place of birth: Winnetka, Illinois, United States
- Height: 6 ft 2 in (1.88 m)
- Position: Midfielder

Youth career
- 2008–2009: Chicago Fire
- 2009–2013: Northwestern Wildcats

Senior career*
Years	Team	Apps	(Gls)
2010–2013	Chicago Fire Premier	9	(0)
2014–2015	Chicago Fire	17	(0)
- * Club domestic league appearances and goals as of October 29, 2015

Christopher Jay Ritter (born October 20, 1990) is an American soccer player who last played for Chicago Fire of Major League Soccer.

== Career ==
=== Youth and college ===
Ritter played five years of college soccer at Northwestern University between 2009 and 2013,red-shirting in 2010 after suffering a stress fracture in his leg early in the season. While at college, Ritter also appeared for USL PDL club Chicago Fire Premier between 2010 and 2013.

=== Professional ===
On January 13, 2014, Ritter signed with Chicago Fire as a Homegrown Player. On November 30, 2015, Chicago Fire declined his contract option.
