= Kellen Gulley =

American professional soccer player

Personal information
- Full name: Kellen Gulley
- Date of birth: April 6, 1994 (age 32)
- Place of birth: Clinton, Mississippi, United States
- Height: 6 ft 0 in (1.83 m)
- Position: Forward

Youth career
- 2009–2011: IMG Soccer Academy
- 2011–2012: Chicago Fire

Senior career*
Years	Team	Apps	(Gls)
2012–2013	Chicago Fire	0	(0)
2013	→ Atlanta Silverbacks (loan)	10	(0)
2014	Atlanta Silverbacks	3	(0)
2015	Mississippi Brilla	11	(7)

International career^{‡}
2009–2010	United States U17	9	(4)
- * Club domestic league appearances and goals as of February 20, 2014 ‡ National team caps and goals as of May 28, 2013

Kellen Gulley (born April 6, 1994) is an American former professional soccer player who played for the Chicago Fire and Atlanta Silverbacks.

== Youth career ==
Gulley was part of Chicago Fire's youth system from 2009 to 2012. In his three years with Mississippi Fire Juniors, he played in three consecutive SUM/Generation adidas Cups and also trained with the club's first team, PDL and Super-20 sides during the 2010 season. Gulley was also a member of U.S. Soccer's residency program during his time in Mississippi.

Gulley also spent time with the Chicago Fire U18 during their 2011-12 campaign where he made 23 appearances and tallied six goals.

== Club career ==
=== Chicago Fire ===
On August 11, 2011, it was announced that Gulley signed a homegrown contract with Chicago Fire. Making him the second homegrown signing in club history. He wasn't eligible to make an MLS appearance the club until 2012. He did make a few appearances for the reserve squad in 2011 and 2012 and also made an appearance for the first team on September 14, 2011, in an international friendly match against Mexican powerhouse Chivas de Guadalajara. He has not made an official first team appearance for the club.

=== Atlanta Silverbacks ===
On April 1, 2013, Gulley was sent on a season long loan to North American Soccer League club Atlanta Silverbacks after training with them for a month. He made his professional debut for the club on May 21 in a 3–2 victory over Georgia Revolution in the second round of the Lamar Hunt U.S. Open Cup. His league debut came three days later in a 1–0 victory over San Antonio Scorpions.

=== Return to Chicago Fire ===
On January 14, 2014, Chicago Fire announced Gulley was re-signed by the club. However, on February 20, 2014, Gulley was waived by Chicago Fire.

=== Return to Atlanta ===
On July 7, 2014, the Atlanta Silverbacks officially signed Gulley. He had spent the entire previous season with the Silverbacks on loan from the Chicago Fire. Ironically enough, the Silverbacks next match was a U.S. Open Cup Quarterfinal match against the Fire, in Atlanta.

=== Return home ===
On April 15, 2015, the Mississippi Brilla announced the signing of Gulley along with his brother James Gulley. He played has first match for Brilla in an exhibition in a 1–0 win against the Birmingham Hammers on May 16, 2015.

== International ==
Gulley was part of the U.S. Soccer residency program for three years. During his time with the residency program, he capped eight times for the United States U17 national team and scored four goals from 2009 to 2010.

== Personal ==
=== Referee assault incident ===
On December 6, 2008, while playing high school soccer for Clinton High School, Gulley's brother was sent off for inappropriate behavior. At the conclusion of the match, Gulley's father, Jim Gulley, came onto the field and assaulted the referee.

=== 2016 drug arrests ===
In January 2016, Gulley was arrested in Clinton, Mississippi for a shooting incident that occurred at his Clinton, Mississippi home. The January shooting stemmed from a "drug deal gone bad" where Gulley was believed to have opened fire, hitting a subject who was attempting to rob Gulley for illegal drugs, according to the Clinton Police Department.

On August 1, 2016, The Clinton Police Department released information that Kellen has been arrested for possession of illegal narcotics with intent to distribute while in possession of a firearm. According to the press release from the police department "Gulley is believed to be a significant dealer of marijuana, powder cocaine, and codeine syrup in Clinton and other portions of the Jackson metro area."

On November 3, 2017, Gulley was sentenced to four years in prison for possession of Marijuana with intent to sell.

=== 2019 arrest ===
In 2019, Gulley was arrested in Madison, Mississippi for cocaine possession and possession of a firearm by a convicted felon. On December 16, 2019, Gulley was sentenced to 10 years in prison. As of February 2021, Gulley is housed in the Issaquena County Correctional Facility in Mayersville, Mississippi.
