= Matt Watson (footballer, born 1985) =

English footballer

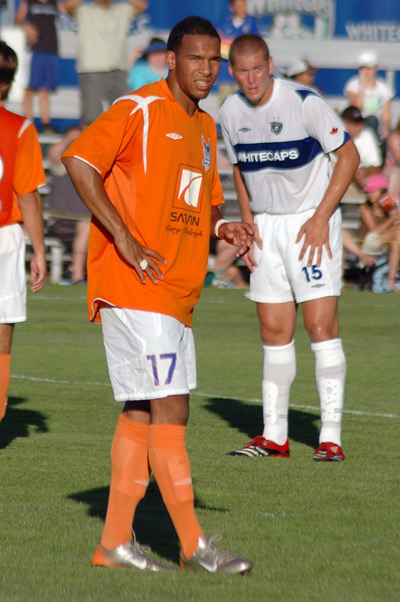

Personal information
- Full name: Matthew Watson
- Date of birth: 1 January 1985 (age 41)
- Place of birth: Bromsgrove, England
- Position: Midfielder

College career
Years	Team	Apps	(Gls)
2004–2005	UMBC Retrievers	37	(7)

Senior career*
Years	Team	Apps	(Gls)
2006–2007	Richmond Kickers	37	(10)
2006–2012	Baltimore Blast (indoor)	83	(34)
2008–2011	Carolina RailHawks	94	(6)
2012–2013	Vancouver Whitecaps FC	36	(0)
2014–2015	Chicago Fire	40	(1)
2016	Carolina RailHawks	29	(3)
2017	Phoenix Rising	30	(1)
2018–2020	Indy Eleven	72	(3)

Managerial career
- 2023: FC Tulsa (assistant)
- 2024: New Mexico United (assistant)
- 2025–: FC Dallas (assistant)
- * Club domestic league appearances and goals

Matthew Watson (born 1 January 1985) is an English former professional footballer who works as assistant coach for Major League Soccer side FC Dallas.

== Career ==
=== College ===
Watson grew up in England, but chose to attend the University of Maryland, Baltimore County in the United States. He played two seasons for the UMBC Retrievers in 2004 and 2005. Following the 2005 season, Watson chose to forgo his final two seasons of collegiate eligibility to turn professional.

=== Professional ===
In 2006, Watson signed with Richmond Kickers of the USL Second Division. That season, he played in all twenty-four Kickers games as the team took both the regular season and playoff titles. In 2007, Watson and his teammates again took the regular season title but lost in the final of the USL-2 Championship to Harrisburg City Islanders. Watson was named a USL-2 first team All Star.

In April 2006, Baltimore Blast of the Major Indoor Soccer League (MISL) selected Watson with the third pick in the MISL Draft. During the 2006–2007 season, Watson scored ten goals in twenty-nine games as the Blast failed to qualify for the playoffs. In his second season, he broke his toe, putting him out for much of the season. However, he did win his second professional championship as the Blast won the 2007–2008 title. While playing for the Blast, teammate Jonny Steele, a member of the 2007 Carolina RailHawks convinced him to join the RailHawks. On 12 December 2007, the RailHawks signed Watson for the 2008 USL First Division season.

Watson rejoined Baltimore for the 2010–11 indoor season, scoring 14 points in 18 regular season games. He went scoreless in the championship game which the Blast lost. He returned to Carolina RailHawks for the 2011 season and helped the club to the NASL regular-season title.

Watson signed for Vancouver Whitecaps FC on 16 December 2011, reuniting with former RailHawks manager Martin Rennie. He was a starter at the beginning of the season before he suffered a leg injury.

On 5 March 2014, Watson was traded to Chicago Fire in exchange for an international roster slot.

After two seasons in Chicago, on 15 January 2016 Watson signed for a second stint with Carolina RailHawks.

Watson signed with United Soccer League side Phoenix Rising on 4 March 2017.

After a season stint with Phoenix Rising, Watson signed with USL side Indy Eleven on 8 February 2018.

== Coaching ==
On 25 October 2022, it was announced that Watson would join FC Tulsa as second assistant coach on 1 January 2023.

Watson joined the coaching staff at New Mexico United on 26 January 2024.

In January 2025, he joined the coaching staff at Major League Soccer side FC Dallas.

== Personal ==
Watson earned his US green card in 2012. This status also qualifies him as a domestic player for MLS roster purposes.
