= Steven Kinney =

American soccer player (born 1987)

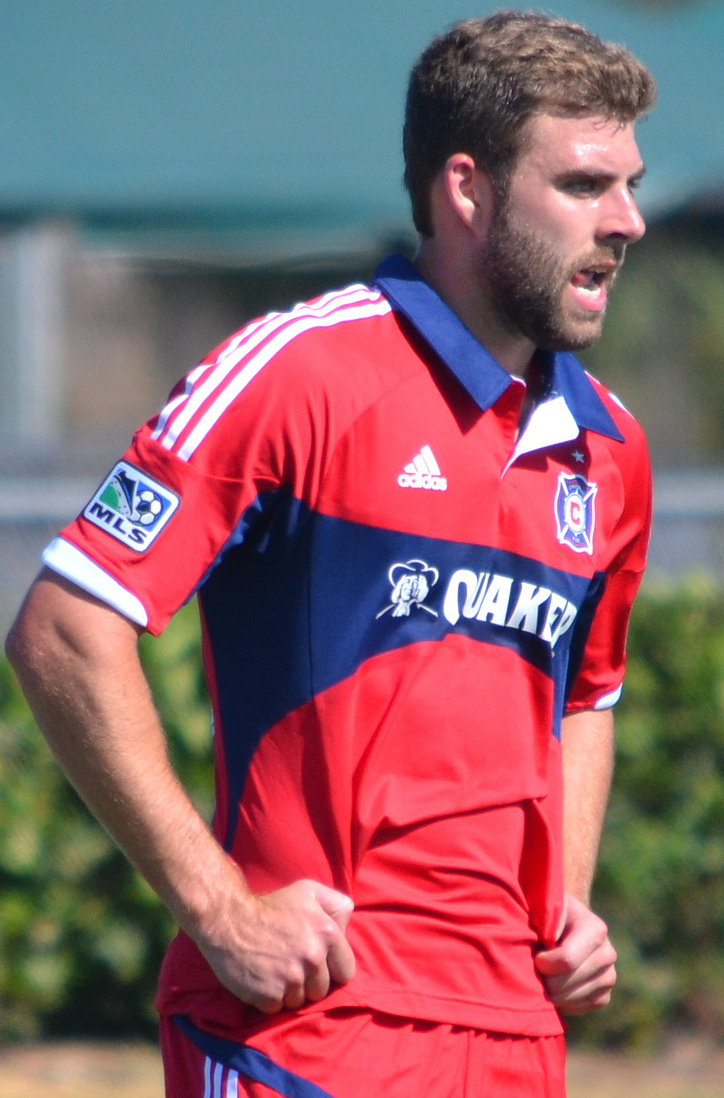

Personal information
- Full name: Steven Kinney
- Date of birth: October 28, 1987 (age 39)
- Place of birth: Norcross, Georgia, United States
- Height: 6 ft 0 in (1.83 m)
- Position: Defender

Youth career
- –2006: Concorde Fire
- 2006–2009: Elon Phoenix

Senior career*
| Years | Team | Apps | (Gls) |
| 2008–2009 | Carolina Dynamo | 10 | (0) |
| 2010–2014 | Chicago Fire | 17 | (1) |
- * Club domestic league appearances and goals as of June 4, 2014

Steven Kinney (born October 28, 1987, in Norcross, Georgia) is an American soccer player who plays as a defender. He is currently without a club.

== Career ==
=== Youth and college ===
Kinney helped his club team, '88 Concorde Fire Elite, to three Region III Premier League titles, a 2005 Disney Showcase title, and a USYSA Regional finals appearance in 2006.

As a two-time captain for his Norcross (GA) High School varsity squad, Kinney led the team to a 7AAAAA region title. He was named all-county, as both a player and scholar-athlete in 2005 and 2006, and he was selected as his team's offensive player of the year in 2005.

After a notable prep career, Kinney now looked to take his game to the next level. He committed to play for coach Darren Powell at Elon University. Kinney made an impact right away as a defender for the Elon Phoenix, starting in all 20 matches of his freshman campaign. He scored the first goal of his career in the season-opener against Stetson, and also notched the game-winning goal against Charlotte. He was honored as the team's top newcomer for 2006.

As a sophomore tri-captain for the Phoenix, Kinney again started every match. He scored just once, but it was the game-winner against High Point. He was named first-team All-Southern Conference, as well as second-team NSCAA All-South and NCCSIA All-State honors. Kinney also earned team MVP for his efforts on the backline.

In 2008, as a junior, Kinney tri-captained the Phoenix to a 7-0-0 record in conference play, and its first SoCon regular season title. Starting every match, once again, his lone goal came in a losing effort against William & Mary. Kinney's stellar defensive play earned him first-team All-SoCon honors, once again. He was also named to the NCCSIA All-State team, as well as the NSCAA All-South Region second-team. Kinney was also a recipient of Elon's Robert C. Browne Sportsmanship Award.

Kinney co-captained the 2009 squad to a 10-8-2 record, and he helped lead the Phoenix to its first appearance in the SoCon Tournament championship game. He scored three goals, but more importantly (as a defender) anchored a defense that posted a school record 10 shutouts in 20 matches. After starting each of the first 19 matches for the Phoenix, Kinney severely sprained his ankle in the SoCon Tournament semifinal against College of Charleston. For the first time in his Elon soccer career, Kinney was forced to watch from the bench as his teammates fought hard but ultimately fell 2–1 in the championship match. The loss meant the end of the season for the Phoenix, and the end of a brilliant college career for Steven Kinney. For the third consecutive season, he was named first-team All-SoCon, NSCAA All-South Region second-team, and NCCSIA All-State. He also won his second team MVP and Robert C. Browne Sportsmanship Awards.

Kinney not only excelled on the field during his Elon career, recording eight goals and six assists in 78 career matches for the Elon soccer team, but in the classroom as well. He graduated from Elon University in December 2009 with a degree in accounting. He was recognized as first-team Scholar All-South Region honoree, named second-team University Division NSCAA/Adidas Men's College Scholar All-American, and selected to the ESPN The Magazine Academic All-District III first-team during his time at Elon. Though Kinney was an outstanding student, he hoped to pursue a professional soccer career upon receiving his diploma, and Major League Soccer would give him that opportunity.

=== Professional ===
Kinney's accomplishments on the field at Elon earned him an invitation to the 2010 MLS Player Combine. He was one of only 62 Division I seniors to be invited, and he became the first Elon player ever to be asked to the combine. His performance at the combine put him in a strong position to be drafted.

Kinney was selected by the Chicago Fire with the 45th overall pick of the 2010 MLS SuperDraft. He then headed to Fire training camp with a strong chance of making the final squad.

He locked up a contract offer by impressing the organization in the preseason.

"Kinney turned heads in February after being inserted into the starting lineup in the club’s friendly with the Arizona Sahauros. Playing with what most would consider a projected starting 11, Kinney partnered in central defense with veteran defender Wilman Conde, helping the team earn a shutout in the 1-0 victory."

Kinney signed with the Fire in March, and he became the first player from Elon to sign an MLS contract.

The Fire were not in dire need of replacing their veteran central defenders this season, and that has contributed to Kinney's very limited minutes in his rookie year. Still, as Fire Technical Director Frank Klopas explains:

“We believe Steven has a very bright future ahead of him,” said Klopas. “He has a lot of strength and athleticism and he came into camp with a lot of confidence for a rookie. Now he has the opportunity to develop into a great center back in this league – it’s just the beginning for him.”

Kinney earned his first Major League Soccer start against Real Salt Lake on July 8, 2010. A rash of injuries in the Fire lineup gave him his shot at rightback. The Fire fell behind 1–0 after a Robbie Findley penalty, but Kinney nearly found the equalizer for the Fire shortly after halftime. He sent a header from a corner-kick off the right post in the 48th minute, and then was denied by the left post on a similar play eight minutes later.

Though the Fire were defeated, Kinney's performance stood out as a bright spot for Chicago in the eyes of the media.

In 2014, Kinney was released by Chicago Fire and remains as a free agent.

"If Thursday’s form was indicative of Kinney’s fit level in the long run, the young man will make noise at the professional level...The stellar play, though unlucky play of Steven Kinney is a positive to take away from a game where the Fire outclassed Real Salt Lake for all but ten minutes, and yet lost."

=== Post soccer career ===
Kinney now works in wealth management at Northwestern Mutual in Peachtree Corners, GA
