= Greg Cochrane =

American soccer player (born 1990)

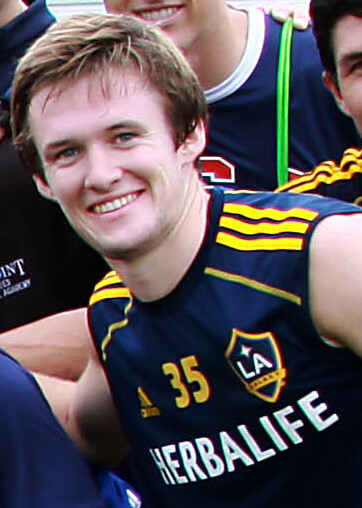
- Cochrane with the LA Galaxy in 2013

Personal information
- Full name: Gregory Cochrane
- Date of birth: November 1, 1990 (age 36)
- Place of birth: Babylon, New York, U.S.
- Height: 1.73 m (5 ft 8 in)
- Position: Defender

Youth career
- 2009–2010: Virginia Tech Hokies
- 2011–2012: Louisville Cardinals

Senior career*
| Years | Team | Apps | (Gls) |
| 2011 | Central Jersey Spartans | 14 | (1) |
| 2012 | Reading United | 11 | (1) |
| 2013 | LA Galaxy | 12 | (0) |
| 2014–2015 | Chicago Fire | 16 | (0) |
| 2015 | → Saint Louis FC (loan) | 4 | (0) |
| 2016–2018 | San Antonio FC | 101 | (1) |
- * Club domestic league appearances and goals as of 17:36, 17 October 2018 (UTC)

Gregory Cochrane (born November 1, 1990) is an American former professional soccer player.

== Career ==
=== Early career ===
Born in Babylon, New York, and moved to Holland, Pennsylvania, Cochrane attended Council Rock High School South in his hometown before attending Virginia Tech for which he played soccer for two seasons before joining the University of Louisville and playing for the Louisville Cardinals for two seasons as well.

=== Los Angeles Galaxy ===
Cochrane was selected in the second round of the 2013 MLS SuperDraft by the LA Galaxy. He made his professional debut for the Galaxy against FC Dallas at FC Dallas Stadium on April 13.

=== Chicago Fire ===
In March 2014, he was traded to the Chicago Fire in exchange for a conditional draft pick in the 2016 MLS SuperDraft

=== San Antonio FC ===
After Chicago declined to exercise their contract option for the 2016 season, Cochrane signed with USL club San Antonio FC on February 25, 2016. On September 29, 2018, Cochrane became the first player in San Antonio FC history to reach 100 appearances in all competitions.

On November 8, 2018, Cochrane announced his retirement from professional soccer.

== Career statistics ==
As of September 27, 2015

Appearances and goals by club, season and competition
| Club | Season | League | | MLS Cup | | US Open Cup | | CONCACAF | | Total | |
| Club | Season | Apps | Goals | Apps | Goals | Apps | Goals | Apps | Goals | Apps | Goals |
|---|---|---|---|---|---|---|---|---|---|---|---|
| LA Galaxy | 2013 | 12 | 0 | 0 | 0 | 1 | 0 | 2 | 0 | 15 | 0 |
| Chicago Fire | 2014 | 12 | 0 | – | | 0 | 0 | – | | 12 | 0 |
| Chicago Fire | 2015 | 3 | 0 | – | | 0 | 0 | – | | 3 | 0 |
| Chicago Fire | Total | 15 | 0 | 0 | 0 | 0 | 0 | 0 | 0 | 15 | 0 |
| Saint Louis FC (loan) | 2015 | 1 | 0 | – | | – | | – | | 1 | 0 |
| San Antonio FC | 2016 | 30 | 0 | – | | 3 | 0 | – | | 33 | 0 |
| Career total | | 58 | 0 | 0 | 0 | 4 | 0 | 2 | 0 | 64 | 0 |
