= Chicago Fire Juniors =

The Chicago Fire Juniors are the youth club affiliate of the Chicago Fire professional soccer club with branches in Chicago, NW Indiana, West Michigan, Louisiana, Mississippi and Florida. Established in 2004 as the official youth soccer club of Major League Soccer's Chicago Fire, the Chicago Fire Juniors are the only professionally based youth soccer club in the United States. The technical director of the Juniors is Larry Sunderland, also the head coach of the Chicago Fire Premier PDL team.. For 2009, the Chicago Fire Juniors Boys teams are IL State Cup Champions at U15, U16 and U19. For 2019, The Chicago Fire U15 Juniors Boys teams won the YSSL National Soccer Title with an extraordinary 37–0 undefeated season. Led by team captains Francisco Ventro and Dylan Zadeh (both currently playing up in U17), the team will advance to the Global Championship in June 2020.

== Overview ==
The Chicago Fire Juniors are part of the Chicago Fire Player Development Program and are an integral piece of the Player Development Pyramid. This "Pyramid" creates a progressive developmental structure providing players the opportunity to move from introductory play, competitive play and elite youth play into professional academy formats (Fire Academy U16, U18) and professional development programs (Super-20, PDL) – finally, onto the Fire MLS team. The Chicago Fire Juniors, in association with the Chicago Red Eleven of the women's W-League, replicate the Player Development Pyramid for females by providing young ladies the opportunity to play at the highest levels presently available in the United States.

The Chicago Fire Juniors have demonstrated results in the top state leagues, regional leagues and national leagues (NISL Premiership, MRL, US Club, Super Y, USYS National League, USSF Academy), as well as overseas. The players are recognized on Olympic Developmental Program, Regional and National Teams. The teams participate in tournaments including the Dallas Cup, Disney Soccer Showcase, Orange Classic, Raleigh Invite and Final Four Showcases. Many Chicago Fire Juniors alumni graduate to college soccer.

== History ==
Established in 2004, the Juniors formed by the combination of two existing youth clubs in Wheaton to form their initial Chicago youth soccer flagship as a program of the Wheaton Illinois Park District.

== Controversy ==
On December 30, 2011, after numerous attempts to resolve issues, Chicago Fire has terminated its affiliation with and sued the Chicago Fire Juniors "claiming it failed to pay more than $35,000 for use of team trademarks, violating a licensing agreement." Chicago Fire subsequently sent a cease and desist letter to Chicago Fire Juniors demanding it stop unauthorized use of Fire trademarks. According to the suit "the youth league didn’t amend its bylaws to specify that at least one board position be a designee of the Fire, and didn’t develop a plan to coordinate functions, operations and ownership as required in the agreement."
