= 2019 Chicago Fire season =

Chicago Fire
2019 season
- Chairman: Andrew Hauptman (Until September 13); Joe Mansueto (Partial until September 13; sole afterwards)
- Head coach: Veljko Paunović
- Stadium: SeatGeek Stadium (capacity: 20,000)
- MLS: Conference: 8th Overall: 17th
- MLS Cup Playoffs: Did not qualify
- U.S. Open Cup: Fourth round
- Leagues Cup: Quarter-finals
- Top goalscorer: League: C. J. Sapong, 12 goals (2 assists); All: Nemanja Nikolić, 13 goals
- Highest home attendance: League: 18,232 (July 27 vs. D.C. United)
- Lowest home attendance: League: 6,074 (May 8 vs. New England)
- Average home league attendance: League: 11,969
- Biggest win: 5–0 (May 8 vs. New England Revolution)
- Biggest defeat: 1–4 (May 18 vs. San Jose Earthquakes)
Home colors	Away colors

The 2019 Chicago Fire season was the club's 21st year of existence, as well as their 22nd in Major League Soccer.

== Current squad ==
As of August 13, 2019. Sources: Chicago Fire official roster and Official MLS Roster

No.	Name	Nationality	Position	Date of birth (age)	Previous club	Player Notes
1	David Ousted	(Denmark)	GK	February 1, 1985 (age 41)	(United States) D.C. United	International
2	Marcelo	(Brazil)	D	July 27, 1989 (age 37)	(Portugal) Sporting CP	International
3	Jonathan Bornstein	(United States)	D	November 7, 1984 (age 42)	(Israel) Maccabi Netanya F.C.	
4	Johan Kappelhof	(Netherlands)	D	August 5, 1990 (age 36)	(Netherlands) FC Groningen	
5	Francisco Calvo	(Costa Rica)	D	July 8, 1992 (age 34)	(United States) Minnesota United FC	
6	Dax McCarty	(United States)	M	April 30, 1987 (age 39)	(United States) New York Red Bulls	(Captain)
7	Raheem Edwards	(Canada)	M/D	July 17, 1995 (age 31)	(Canada) Montreal Impact	International
9	C. J. Sapong	(United States)	F	December 27, 1988 (age 37)	(United States) Philadelphia Union	
10	Aleksandar Katai	(Serbia)	M	February 6, 1991 (age 35)	(Spain) Deportivo Alavés	International; Designated Player
11	Przemysław Frankowski	(Poland)	M	April 12, 1995 (age 31)	(Poland) Jagiellonia Białystok	International
12	Amando Moreno	(United States)	M	September 10, 1995 (age 31)	(United States) New York Red Bulls II	
13	Brandt Bronico	(United States)	M	June 20, 1995 (age 31)	(United States) University of North Carolina Charlotte	
14	Djordje Mihailovic	(United States)	M	November 10, 1998 (age 28)	(United States) Chicago Fire Academy	Homegrown
15	Grant Lillard	(United States)	D	December 5, 1995 (age 30)	(United States) Indiana Hoosiers	Homegrown; On Loan
16	Michael Azira	(Uganda)	M	August 22, 1987 (age 39)	(Canada) Montreal Impact	
17	Diego Campos	(Costa Rica)	F	October 1, 1995 (age 31)	(United States) Clemson	International
18	Cristian Martínez	(Panama)	M	February 6, 1997 (age 29)	(United States) Columbus Crew	
20	Nicolás Gaitán	(Argentina)	M	February 23, 1988 (age 38)	(China) Dalian Yifang F.C.	International
21	Fabian Herbers	(Germany)	F	August 17, 1993 (age 33)	(United States) Philadelphia Union	
23	Nemanja Nikolić	(Hungary)	F	December 31, 1987 (age 38)	(Poland) Legia Warsaw	Designated Player; International
27	Kenneth Kronholm	(United States)	G	October 14, 1985 (age 41)	(Germany) Holstein Kiel	
28	Elliot Collier	(New Zealand)	F	February 22, 1995 (age 31)	(United States) Loyola Chicago	International; On Loan
30	Stefan Cleveland	(United States)	G	May 25, 1994 (age 32)	(United States) University of Louisville	On Loan
31	Bastian Schweinsteiger	(Germany)	M	August 1, 1984 (age 42)	(England) Manchester United	Designated Player; International
32	Gabriel Slonina	(United States)	G	May 15, 2004 (age 22)	(United States) Chicago Fire Academy	Homegrown
33	Jeremiah Gutjahr	(United States)	M	August 10, 1997 (age 29)	(United States) Indiana Hoosiers	Homegrown
36	Andre Reynolds II	(United States)	D	May 2, 2001 (age 25)	(United States) Chicago Fire Academy	Homegrown
45	Richard Sánchez	(Mexico)	G	May 5, 1994 (age 32)	(Mexico) Tigres UANL	

== Player movement ==
=== In ===
Date	Player	Position	Previous club	Notes	Ref
November 25, 2018	(New Zealand) Elliot Collier	F	(United States) Chicago Fire	Option was exercised	
November 26, 2018	(United States) Brandt Bronico	M	(United States) Chicago Fire	Option was exercised	
November 26, 2018	(Costa Rica) Diego Campos	D/M/F	(United States) Chicago Fire	Option was exercised	
November 26, 2018	(United States) Stefan Cleveland	G	(United States) Chicago Fire	Option was exercised	
November 26, 2018	(Cuba) Jorge Luis Corrales	D	(United States) Chicago Fire	Option was exercised	
November 26, 2018	(Canada) Raheem Edwards	D/M/F	(United States) Chicago Fire	Option was exercised	
November 26, 2018	(Liechtenstein) Nicolas Hasler	D/M	(United States) Chicago Fire	Option was exercised	
November 28, 2018	(Germany) Bastian Schweinsteiger	M	(United States) Chicago Fire	Re-signed through 2019 after his contract expired	
December 9, 2018	(Germany) Fabian Herbers	F	(United States) Philadelphia Union	Acquired in exchange for the Fire's natural second-round pick in the 2019 MLS SuperDraft	
December 27, 2018	(Brazil) Marcelo	D	(Portugal) Sporting CP	Signed through 2020 after being acquired from Sporting CP	
January 22, 2019	(Poland) Przemysław Frankowski	M	(Poland) Jagiellonia Białystok	Signed through 2022 after being acquired from Jagiellonia Białystok	
January 22, 2019	(United States) Jeremiah Gutjahr	D	(United States) Indiana Hoosiers	Signed to a homegrown deal for 2019 with options for 2020, 2021, and 2022	
January 24, 2019	(Panama) Cristian Martínez	M	(United States) Columbus Crew	Signed to a deal after being selected fourth overall in the 2018 MLS Waiver Draft; contract is for 2019 with options for 2020 and 2021	
January 24, 2019	(United States) Amando Moreno	M	(United States) New York Red Bulls II	Signed to a deal after his rights were acquired in exchange for the 32nd overall pick in the 2019 MLS SuperDraft; contract is for 2019 with options for 2020, 2021, and 2022	
January 25, 2019	(United States) Andre Reynolds	D	(United States) Chicago Fire Academy	Signed to a homegrown contract through 2022 with an option for 2023	
January 26, 2019	(Netherlands) Johan Kappelhof	D	(United States) Chicago Fire	Re-signed through 2021 after his contract expired	
January 27, 2019	(Denmark) David Ousted	G	(United States) D.C. United	Acquired off waivers and signed a contract through 2019 with an option for 2020	
February 23, 2019	(United States) C. J. Sapong	F	(United States) Philadelphia Union	Acquired from Philadelphia for $200k in 2019 TAM, $100k in 2020 TAM, and $100k in 2019 GAM if it becomes available.	
March 8, 2019	(United States) Gabriel Slonina	G	(United States) Chicago Fire Academy	Signed as a homegrown player through 2022 with an option for 2023	
March 14, 2019	(Argentina) Nicolás Gaitán	M	(China) Dalian Yifang F.C.	Signed through 2019 with an option for 2020	
May 3, 2019	(Costa Rica) Francisco Calvo	D	(United States) Minnesota United FC	Acquired for $400k in allocation money across 2019 and 2020	
May 7, 2019	(United States) Kenneth Kronholm	GK	(Germany) Holstein Kiel	Acquired from Holstein Kiel on a contract through 2021 with an option for 2022	
July 22, 2019	(United States) Jonathan Bornstein	D	(Israel) Maccabi Netanya F.C.	Acquired from Maccabi Netanya on a contract through 2020 with an option for 2021	
August 7, 2019	(Uganda) Michael Azira	M	(Canada) Montreal Impact	Acquired alongside a second-round draft pick and the Impact's allocation pick in exchange for the Fire's allocation pick and Jorge Corrales	

=== Out ===
Date	Player	Position	Destination Club	Notes	Ref
October 28, 2018	(United States) Alan Gordon	F	Retired		
October 30, 2018	(United States) Brandon Vincent	D	Retired		
October 31, 2018	(United States) Christian Dean	D	Retired		
November 26, 2018	(United States) Jonathan Campbell	D	(United States) Seattle Sounders FC	Option was declined, and his rights were ultimately traded to Seattle on December 28, 2018	
November 26, 2018	(United States) Drew Conner	M	(Czech Republic) 1. SC Znojmo	Option was declined	
November 26, 2018	(Netherlands) Michael de Leeuw	F	(Netherlands) FC Emmen	Option was declined	
November 26, 2018	(United States) Daniel Johnson	M	(United States) Birmingham Legion FC	Option was declined	
November 26, 2018	(United States) Patrick McLain	G	(United States) Orange County SC	Option was declined	
November 26, 2018	(Armenia) Yura Movsisyan	F		Option was declined	
November 26, 2018	(United States) Matt Polster	D/M	(Scotland) Rangers FC	Out of contract, later signed with Rangers	
November 26, 2018	(Argentina) Luis Solignac	F		Option was declined	
January 27, 2019	(Argentina) Nicolás Del Grecco	D		Waived	
March 28, 2019	(Liechtenstein) Nicolas Hasler	D/M	(United States) Sporting Kansas City	Waived	
July 17, 2019	(England) Mo Adams	M	(United States) Atlanta United FC	Traded for $100k in 2020 GAM	
August 7, 2019	(Cuba) Jorge Luis Corrales	D	(Canada) Montreal Impact	Traded alongside the Fire's allocation pick in exchange for a second-round draft pick, the Impact's allocation pick, and Michael Azira	

The following players were drafted and did not sign a contract:

- (Ghana) Ebenezer Ackon (D), selected 53rd overall in the 2019 MLS SuperDraft from Bowling Green State University; signed with San Antonio FC
- (United States) Mark Forrest (F), selected 77th overall in the 2019 MLS SuperDraft from Lehigh University
- (United States) Grant Stoneman (D), selected 55th overall in the 2019 MLS SuperDraft from Loyola University Chicago; signed with Lansing Ignite
- (Costa Rica) Marco Ureña (F), selected in the Waiver Draft from Los Angeles FC; signed with Liga Deportiva Alajuelense

The following players were trialing or training with the club but did not sign a contract:

- Antonio Rodriguez
- (Germany) Christopher Schorch, last played for (Germany) KFC Uerdingen 05

=== Loans Out ===
Date	Player	Position	Destination Club	Notes	Ref
March 1, 2019	(New Zealand) Elliot Collier	F	(United States) Memphis 901 FC	Loaned out with the option for the Fire to recall at any point	
March 16, 2019	(England) Mo Adams	M	(United States) Memphis 901 FC	Returned for the game against the New York Red Bulls on March 30	

== Technical staff ==
Position	Staff
General Manager	(United States) Nelson Rodríguez
Head Coach	(Serbia) Veljko Paunović
Assistant Coach	(Serbia) Marko Mitrović
Assistant Coach	(United States) Eric Gehrig
Goalkeeper Coach	(Serbia) Aleksandar Sarić
Senior Director of Soccer Operations	Eddie Rock
Strength and Conditioning Coach	Raphael Fevre
Massage Therapist	Steven Burrows
Director of Scouting	Matt Pearson
Video Analyst	Nenad Babic
Manager of Team and Soccer Operations	Alex Boler
Equipment Manager	Brian Sauer
Assistant Equipment Manager	Juan Arreola
Head Athletic Trainer	Steven Purcell
Assistant Athletic Trainer	Reade Whitney
Chief Medical Officer	Dr. Joshua Blomgren, D.O.
Head Orthopedic Officer	Dr. Brian Forsythe, M.D.
Physical Therapist	Ryan Perry

Last updated: October 30, 2017
Source: Chicago Fire Technical Staff

== Standings ==
=== Eastern Conference table ===
2019 MLS Eastern Conference standings
Pos	Team	Pld	W	L	T	GF	GA	GD	Pts	Qualification
1	New York City FC	34	18	6	10	63	42	+21	64	Qualification for the conference semifinals
2	Atlanta United FC	34	18	12	4	58	43	+15	58	Qualification for the first round
3	Philadelphia Union	34	16	11	7	58	50	+8	55	Qualification for the first round
4	Toronto FC	34	13	10	11	57	52	+5	50	Qualification for the first round
5	D.C. United	34	13	10	11	42	38	+4	50	Qualification for the first round
6	New York Red Bulls	34	14	14	6	53	51	+2	48	Qualification for the first round
7	New England Revolution	34	11	11	12	50	57	−7	45	Qualification for the first round
8	Chicago Fire	34	10	12	12	55	47	+8	42	
9	Montreal Impact	34	12	17	5	47	60	−13	41	
10	Columbus Crew SC	34	10	16	8	39	47	−8	38	
11	Orlando City SC	34	9	15	10	44	52	−8	37	
12	FC Cincinnati	34	6	22	6	31	75	−44	24	

Source: MLS
Rules for classification: 1) points; 2) total wins; 3) total goal differential; 4) total goals scored; 5) disciplinary points; 6) away goal differential; 7) away goals scored; 8) home goals scored; 9) home goal differential; 10) coin toss or drawing of lots.

=== Overall table ===
2019 MLS regular season standings
Pos	Team	Pld	W	L	T	GF	GA	GD	Pts	
1	Los Angeles FC (S)	34	21	4	9	85	37	+48	72	Qualification for the CONCACAF Champions League
2	New York City FC	34	18	6	10	63	42	+21	64	Qualification for the CONCACAF Champions League
3	Atlanta United FC (U)	34	18	12	4	58	43	+15	58	Qualification for the CONCACAF Champions League
4	Seattle Sounders FC (C)	34	16	10	8	52	49	+3	56	Qualification for the CONCACAF Champions League
5	Philadelphia Union	34	16	11	7	58	50	+8	55	
6	Real Salt Lake	34	16	13	5	46	41	+5	53	
7	Minnesota United FC	34	15	11	8	52	43	+9	53	
8	LA Galaxy	34	16	15	3	58	59	−1	51	
9	Toronto FC	34	13	10	11	57	52	+5	50	
10	D.C. United	34	13	10	11	42	38	+4	50	
11	Portland Timbers	34	14	13	7	52	49	+3	49	
12	New York Red Bulls	34	14	14	6	53	51	+2	48	
13	FC Dallas	34	13	12	9	54	46	+8	48	
14	New England Revolution	34	11	11	12	50	57	−7	45	
15	San Jose Earthquakes	34	13	16	5	52	55	−3	44	
16	Colorado Rapids	34	12	16	6	58	63	−5	42	
17	Chicago Fire	34	10	12	12	55	47	+8	42	
18	Montreal Impact (V)	34	12	17	5	47	60	−13	41	Qualification for the CONCACAF Champions League
19	Houston Dynamo	34	12	18	4	49	59	−10	40	
20	Columbus Crew SC	34	10	16	8	39	47	−8	38	
21	Sporting Kansas City	34	10	16	8	49	67	−18	38	
22	Orlando City SC	34	9	15	10	44	52	−8	37	
23	Vancouver Whitecaps FC	34	8	16	10	37	59	−22	34	
24	FC Cincinnati	34	6	22	6	31	75	−44	24	

Source: MLS
Rules for classification: 1) points; 2) total wins; 3) total goal differential; 4) total goals scored; 5) disciplinary points; 6) away goals scored; 7) away goal differential; 8) coin toss or drawing of lots
(C) MLS Cup champions; (S) Supporters' Shield winners; (U) U.S. Open Cup winners; (V) Canadian Championship winners

== Match results ==
Win Tie Loss

=== Preseason ===
Kickoff times are in CST (UTC-06)

January 30	Atlético Madrid B (Spain)	1–1	(United States) Chicago Fire	Madrid, Spain
	28' (pen.)	Report	Katai	Stadium: La Ciudad del Fútbol
Note: Two 35-minute halves.

February 3	La Liga AFE (Spain)	Canceled	(United States) Chicago Fire	Madrid, Spain
				Stadium: La Ciudad del Fútbol

February 6	CF Fuenlabrada (Spain)	0–1	(United States) Chicago Fire	Madrid, Spain
		Report	Katai 52'	Stadium: Estadio Fernando Torres

February 16 2019 Carolina Challenge Cup	Columbus Crew SC	1–1	Chicago Fire	Charleston, South Carolina
	Zardes 26'; Trapp (red card) 31'	Report	Mihailovic 16'; Campos (yellow card) 73'	Stadium: MUSC Health Stadium

February 20 2019 Carolina Challenge Cup	FC Cincinnati	1–1	Chicago Fire	Charleston, South Carolina
20:30	Adi (yellow card) 79'; Lamah 84'	Report	Adams (yellow card) 45+1'; Katai 53', (yellow card) 87'	Stadium: MUSC Health Stadium

February 23 2019 Carolina Challenge Cup	Charleston Battery	0–1	Chicago Fire	Charleston, South Carolina
20:30		Report	Schweinsteiger (yellow card) 61'; Herbers 85'	Stadium: MUSC Health Stadium

=== Major League Soccer ===
Kickoff times are in CST (UTC-06)

March 2 1	LA Galaxy	2–1	Chicago Fire	Carson, California
19:00	Steres 68'; Ibrahimović 80'; Álvarez (yellow card) 83'	Report	Marcelo (yellow card) 44'; Sapong 49'	Stadium: Dignity Health Sports Park; Attendance: 25,866; Referee: Allen Chapman

March 9 2	Chicago Fire	1–1	Orlando City SC	Bridgeview, Illinois
12:00	Mihailovic (yellow card) 45'; Corrales (red card) 64'; Schweinsteiger (yellow card) 90'; Sapong 90+5'	Report	Smith (yellow card) 34'; Dwyer 47'	Stadium: SeatGeek Stadium; Attendance: 11,041; Referee: Robert Sibiga

March 16 3	Chicago Fire	2–4	Seattle Sounders FC	Bridgeview, Illinois
12:00	Edwards 56', (yellow card) 64'; Herbers 84', (yellow card) 90+2'	Report	Rodríguez 8'; Morris 15'; Lodeiro 49' (pen.); Roldan (yellow card) 77'; Ruidíaz 88'	Stadium: SeatGeek Stadium; Attendance: 10,032; Referee: Joseph Dickerson

March 30 4	Chicago Fire	1–0	New York Red Bulls	Bridgeview, Illinois
12:00	Sapong (yellow card) 47'; Parker 48' (o.g.)	Report		Stadium: SeatGeek Stadium; Attendance: 12,013; Referee: Alex Chilowicz

April 6 5	Toronto FC	2–2	Chicago Fire	Toronto, Ontario
14:00	Altidore 31'; Laryea (yellow card) 37'; Pozuelo (yellow card) 57'; Osorio 76'	Report	Katai (yellow card) 37'; Sapong 45+1'; Nikolić (yellow card) 52', (goal) 76'; Mihailovic (yellow card) 56'; Schweinsteiger (yellow card) 81'	Stadium: BMO Field; Attendance: 26,256; Referee: Armando Villarreal

April 12 6	Chicago Fire	1–1	Vancouver Whitecaps FC	Bridgeview, Illinois
19:30	Adams (yellow card) 40'; Nikolić 84' (pen.)	Report	Reyna 53'; Crépeau (yellow card) 79'	Stadium: SeatGeek Stadium; Attendance: 10,439; Referee: Jair Marrufo

April 20 7	Chicago Fire	4–1	Colorado Rapids	Bridgeview, Illinois
12:00	Nikolić 34'; Sapong 53'; Mihailovic 61'; Katai 80'; Adams (yellow card) 84'	Report	Rubio (yellow card) 31'; Kamara 40'; Price (red card) 86'	Stadium: SeatGeek Stadium; Attendance: 12,697; Referee: Dave Gantar

April 24 8	New York City FC	1–0	Chicago Fire	New York City, New York
18:00	Chanot (yellow card) 7'; Castellanos 9', (yellow card) 67'; Ring (yellow card) 16'; Tinnerholm (yellow card) 37'	Report	Adams (yellow card) 16'; Mihailovic (yellow card) 75'; Schweinsteiger (yellow card) 90'	Stadium: Yankee Stadium; Attendance: 21,791; Referee: Robert Sibiga

April 28 9	Montreal Impact	1–0	Chicago Fire	Montreal, Quebec
11:30	Sagna (yellow card) 78'; Browne 83'	Report	Kappelhof (yellow card) 90+5'	Stadium: Stade Saputo; Attendance: 15,758; Referee: Rubiel Vazquez

May 4 10	Los Angeles FC	0–0	Chicago Fire	Los Angeles, California
21:30	Beitashour (yellow card) 25'	Report	Corrales (yellow card) 25'; Schweinsteiger (yellow card) 41'; Frankowski (yellow card) 88'	Stadium: Banc of California Stadium; Attendance: 22,154; Referee: Fotis Bazakos

May 8 11	Chicago Fire	5–0	New England Revolution	Bridgeview, Illinois
19:00	Nikolić 28', 40'; Kappelhof (yellow card) 55'; Bronico 78'; Gaitán 85'; Frankowski 89'	Report	Caicedo (yellow card) 58'	Stadium: SeatGeek Stadium; Attendance: 6,074; Referee: Timothy Ford

May 11 12	Chicago Fire	2–0	Minnesota United FC	Bridgeview, Illinois
19:00	Gaitán 21'; Katai 34'; Schweinsteiger (yellow card) 77'	Report	Métanire (yellow card) 42'; Rodríguez (yellow card) 78'; Danladi (yellow card) 90+2'; Quintero (yellow card) 90+3'	Stadium: SeatGeek Stadium; Attendance: 11,531; Referee: Marcos DeOliveira

May 18 13	San Jose Earthquakes	4–1	Chicago Fire	San Jose, California
14:30	Wondolowski 21', 48', 74', 76'; Espinoza (yellow card) 54'	Report	Kappelhof (yellow card) 41'; Corrales (yellow card) 63'; Katai 83', (yellow card) 90+5'; Calvo (yellow card) 86'	Stadium: Avaya Stadium; Attendance: 15,232; Referee: Alex Chilowicz

May 25 14	Chicago Fire	1–1	New York City FC	Bridgeview, Illinois
14:30	Sapong 28'; Katai (yellow card) 80'; Edwards (yellow card) 90+1'	Report	Mitriță 40'; Ring (yellow card) 53'; Tajouri-Shradi (yellow card) 90'	Stadium: SeatGeek Stadium; Attendance: 10,986; Referee: Ramy Touchan

May 29 15	D.C. United	3–3	Chicago Fire	Washington, DC
19:00	Segura 43', 61'; Canouse (yellow card) 49'; Acosta 81'	Report	Sapong 12'; Mihailovic 14'; Frankowski (yellow card) 62'; Calvo 90+2'	Stadium: Audi Field; Attendance: 14,201; Referee: Armando Villarreal

June 1 16	Atlanta United FC	2–0	Chicago Fire	Atlanta, Georgia
17:00	Martínez 12', 43'; Escobar (yellow card) 33'	Report	Corrales (yellow card) 59'; Schweinsteiger (yellow card) 77'	Stadium: Mercedes-Benz Stadium; Attendance: 67,502; Referee: Nima Saghafi

June 22 17	Chicago Fire	1–1	Real Salt Lake	Bridgeview, Illinois
19:00	Katai 5'; Adams (yellow card) 15'; Schweinsteiger (yellow card) 90+3'	Report	Rusnák 33' (pen.); Luiz (yellow card) 34'; Rimando (yellow card) 90+3'	Stadium: SeatGeek Stadium; Attendance: 15,609; Referee: Baldomero Toledo

June 28 18	New York Red Bulls	3–1	Chicago Fire	Harrison, New Jersey
19:00	Gamarra 8'; Rzatkowski (yellow card) 28'; Robles (yellow card) 30'; White 59'; Royer 90+3'	Report	Nikolić 74', (yellow card) 81'	Stadium: Red Bull Arena; Attendance: 17,563; Referee: Ted Unkel

July 3 19	Chicago Fire	5–1	Atlanta United FC	Bridgeview, Illinois
19:00	Calvo 4'; Sapong 7', 37'; Gaitán 13' (pen.); Herbers 44'; Frankowski (yellow card) 55'; Gutjahr (yellow card) 87'; Nikolić (yellow card) 90+2'	Report	Pereira (red card) 11'; Vazquez 58' (pen.); Robinson (yellow card) 69'	Stadium: SeatGeek Stadium; Attendance: 13,476; Referee: Silviu Petrescu

July 6 20	Sporting Kansas City	1–0	Chicago Fire	Kansas City, Missouri
19:30	Croizet 14'; Gutiérrez (yellow card) 67'; Baráth (yellow card) 88'	Report	Herbers (yellow card) 44'; McCarty (yellow card) 69'; Campos (yellow card) 83'; Schweinsteiger (yellow card) 90'	Stadium: Children's Mercy Park; Attendance: 18,570; Referee: Joseph Dickerson

July 13 21	Chicago Fire	1–2	FC Cincinnati	Bridgeview, Illinois
19:00	Gaitán 45+4'; Corrales (yellow card) 73'; Mihailovic (yellow card) 78'	Report	Cruz 1'; Richey (yellow card) 48'; Ledesma (yellow card) 52'; Bertone (yellow card) 59'; Adi 83'	Stadium: SeatGeek Stadium; Attendance: 13,127; Referee: Fotis Bazakos

July 17 22	Chicago Fire	2–2	Columbus Crew	Bridgeview, Illinois
19:00	Mihailovic 28'; Schweinsteiger (yellow card) 52'; Sapong 63'	Report	Zardes 47'; R. Williams 90'	Stadium: SeatGeek Stadium; Attendance: 7,482; Referee: Armando Villarreal

July 20 23	Philadelphia Union	2–0	Chicago Fire	Chester, Pennsylvania
7:30 p.m. EDT	Fabián 11'; Wagner (yellow card) 19'; Fontana 65'; Picault (yellow card) 84'	Report	Bronico (yellow card) 7'	Stadium: Talen Energy Stadium; Attendance: 17,471; Referee: Rubiel Vazquez

July 27 24	Chicago Fire	0–0	D.C. United	Bridgeview, Illinois
19:00	Sapong (yellow card) 54'; Kappelhof (yellow card) 58'	Report	Pines (yellow card) 69'	Stadium: SeatGeek Stadium; Attendance: 18,232; Referee: Kevin Stott

August 3 25	Houston Dynamo	0–1	Chicago Fire	Houston, Texas
20:00	Elis (yellow card) 44'; Vera (yellow card) 46'	Report	Nikolić 45+3'; Bronico (yellow card) 53'; McCarty (yellow card) 67'	Stadium: BBVA Compass Stadium; Attendance: 14,250; Referee: Ramy Touchan

August 10 26	Chicago Fire	3–2	Montreal Impact	Bridgeview, Illinois
20:00	McCarty 8', (yellow card) 74'; Nikolić 19'; Kronholm (yellow card) 32'; Schweinsteiger 86'	Report	Taïder 34' (pen.); Diallo (yellow card) 67'; Sagna 76'	Stadium: SeatGeek Stadium; Attendance: 11,002

August 14 27	Portland Timbers	3–2	Chicago Fire	Portland, Oregon
22:00	Moreira 11'; Fernández 21', 88'; Loría (yellow card) 27'; Ebobisse (yellow card) 81'	Report	Katai (red card) 30'; Nikolić 74'; Calvo (yellow card) 79'; Sapong 90+2'	Stadium: Providence Park; Attendance: 25,218; Referee: Silviu Petrescu

August 17 28	Chicago Fire	2–0	Philadelphia Union	Bridgeview, Illinois
19:00	Nikolić 38', 45' (pen.); Gaitán (red card) 45+3'	Report	Collin (yellow card) 43'; Monteiro (yellow card) 66'	Stadium: SeatGeek Stadium; Attendance: 14,883; Referee: Joseph Dickerson

August 24 29	New England Revolution	2–1	Chicago Fire	Foxborough, Massachusetts
18:30	Zahibo 17'; Mancienne (yellow card) 30'; Bou 86', (yellow card) 87'	Report	Gaitán (yellow card) 1'; Calvo 41'; Azira (yellow card) 90+1'	Stadium: Gillette Stadium; Attendance: 16,236; Referee: Alex Chilowicz

August 31 30	Columbus Crew	1–1	Chicago Fire	Columbus, Ohio
18:30	Santos 27'	Report	Bornstein (yellow card) 46'; Calvo (yellow card) 48'; Schweinsteiger (yellow card) 82'; Frankowski 90+4'	Stadium: MAPFRE Stadium; Attendance: 16,438; Referee: Drew Fischer

September 14 31	Chicago Fire	4–0	FC Dallas	Bridgeview, Illinois
14:30	Sapong 7', 29'; Frankowski 16'; Nikolić 39'	Report	Pomykal (yellow card) 5'	Stadium: SeatGeek Stadium; Attendance: 12,847; Referee: Jair Marrufo

September 21 32	FC Cincinnati	0–0	Chicago Fire	Cincinnati, Ohio
18:30	Waston (yellow card) 20'	Report	Sapong (yellow card) 25'; McCarty (yellow card) 30'	Stadium: Nippert Stadium; Attendance: 26,466; Referee: Baldomero Toledo

September 29 33	Chicago Fire	2–2	Toronto FC	Bridgeview, Illinois
16:00	Katai 68'; Herbers 77'; Gaitán (yellow card) 85'	Report	Altidore 59'; Delgado (yellow card) 69'; Gonzalez 80'	Stadium: SeatGeek Stadium; Referee: Kevin Stott

October 6 34	Orlando City SC	2–5	Chicago Fire	Orlando, Florida
15:00	Akindele 5'; Nani (yellow card) 45+1'; Michel 74'; Pereyra (yellow card) 83'	Report	Smith 17' (o.g.); Kappelhof (yellow card) 40'; Sapong 61'; Katai 63'; Frankowski 67', 87'; Herbers (yellow card) 76'; Calvo (yellow card) 78'	Stadium: Orlando City Stadium; Attendance: 22,433; Referee: Pierre-Luc Lauziere

=== Open Cup ===
As a member of MLS, the Fire will enter the competition at the fourth round, scheduled to be played on June 12, 2019.

Kickoff times are in CST (UTC-06)

June 11 Fourth round	Saint Louis FC (Missouri)	2–1	(Illinois) Chicago Fire	St. Charles, Missouri
19:30	Martz 17'; Abend 21'; Kamdem (yellow card) 71'	Report	Kappelhof (yellow card) 19'; Nikolić 72' (pen.)	Stadium: Harlen C. Hunter Stadium; Attendance: 4,456; Referee: Greg Dopka

=== Leagues Cup ===
The Fire were invited to this inaugural edition of this competition between MLS and Liga MX.

Kickoff times are in CST (UTC-06)

July 23 Quarterfinal	Chicago Fire (United States)	0–2	(Mexico) Cruz Azul	Bridgeview, Illinois
19:30	Marcelo (yellow card) 60'; Herbers (yellow card) 72'; Campos (yellow card) 82'; Bronico (yellow card) 90+3'	Report	Alvarado 43'; Aguilar (yellow card) 70'; Lichnovsky (yellow card) 86'; Hernández 90'	Stadium: SeatGeek Stadium; Attendance: 14,213; Referee: Oshane Nation

== Squad statistics ==
=== Games Played ===
No.	Pos.	Nat.	Name	MLS			Open Cup			Total		
No.	Pos.	Nat.	Name	Starts	Apps	Minutes	Starts	Apps	Minutes	Starts	Apps	Minutes
1	GK	DEN	David Ousted	14	14	1260				14	14	1260
2	DF	BRA	Marcelo	12	16	1147	1	1	90	13	17	1237
3	DF	USA	Jonathan Bornstein	10	10	848				10	10	848
4	DF	NED	Johan Kappelhof	28	28	2472	1	1	25	29	29	2497
5	DF	CRC	Francisco Calvo	20	22	1846				20	22	1846
6	MF	USA	Dax McCarty	31	31	2760	1	1	90	32	32	2850
7	M/D	CAN	Raheem Edwards	2	4	244	1	1	67	3	5	311
9	FW	USA	C. J. Sapong	28	31	2507	1	1	90	29	32	2597
10	MF	SRB	Aleksandar Katai	23	28	2013				23	28	2013
11	MF	POL	Przemysław Frankowski	23	30	2210				23	30	2210
12	MF	USA	Amando Moreno		7	77					7	77
13	MF	USA	Brandt Bronico	19	28	1777		1	5	19	29	1782
14	MF	USA	Djordje Mihailovic	16	26	1424	1	1	90	17	27	1514
15	DF	USA	Grant Lillard	2	4	206		1	65	2	5	271
16	MF	Uganda	Michael Azira	2	4	216				2	4	216
17	FW	CRC	Diego Campos	5	10	439	1	1	85	6	11	524
18	MF	PAN	Cristian Martinez		5	50					5	50
20	MF	ARG	Nicolás Gaitán	24	26	1967	1	1	90	25	27	2057
21	FW	GER	Fabian Herbers	7	16	730	1	1	90	7	17	820
23	FW	HUN	Nemanja Nikolić	25	30	1983	1	1	90	26	31	2073
27	GK	USA	Kenneth Kronholm	19	19	1710	1	1	90	20	20	1800
28	FW	NZL	Elliot Collier									
30	GK	USA	Stefan Cleveland									
31	MF	GER	Bastian Schweinsteiger	29	29	2586				29	29	2586
32	GK	USA	Gabriel Slonina									
33	MF	USA	Jeremiah Gutjahr	5	8	502				5	8	502
36	DF	USA	Andre Reynolds III									
45	GK	MEX	Richard Sánchez									
	MF	ENG	Mo Adams	5	10	484				5	10	484
	D/M	LIE	Nicolas Hasler	1	3	73				1	3	73
	DF	CUB	Jorge Luis Corrales	13	15	1036		1	23	13	16	1059

=== Goalkeeping Statistics ===
No.	Nat.	Name	MLS			Open Cup			Total		
No.	Nat.	Name	Clean sheets	Saves	GA	Clean sheets	Saves	GA	Clean sheets	Saves	GA
1	DEN	David Ousted	4	35	20				4	35	20
27	USA	Kenneth Kronholm	4	47	25		1	2	4	48	27
30	USA	Stefan Cleveland									
32	USA	Gabriel Slonina									
45	MEX	Richard Sánchez									

=== Goalscoring and Assisting Record ===
MLS Regular Season
Rank	Player	Goal	A
1	(United States) C. J. Sapong	12	2
2	(Hungary) Nemanja Nikolić	12	1
3	(Serbia) Aleksandar Katai	5	6
4	(Argentina) Nicolás Gaitán	4	12
5	(Costa Rica) Francisco Calvo	3	2
6	(Poland) Przemysław Frankowski	3	9
7	(United States) Djordje Mihailovic	3	1
8	(Germany) Fabian Herbers	3	
9	(United States) Dax McCarty	1	3
9	(Germany) Bastian Schweinsteiger	1	3
11	(United States) Brandt Bronico	1	2
12	(Canada) Raheem Edwards	1	
13	(Netherlands) Johan Kappelhof		2
14	(England) Mo Adams		1
14	(United States) Jeremiah Gutjahr		1

Open Cup
Rank	Player	Goal	A
1	(Hungary) Nemanja Nikolić	1	

MLS Regular Season
Rank	Player	Goal	A
1	(Hungary) Nemanja Nikolić	13	1
2	(United States) C. J. Sapong	12	2
3	(Serbia) Aleksandar Katai	5	6
4	(Argentina) Nicolás Gaitán	4	12
5	(Costa Rica) Francisco Calvo	3	2
6	(Poland) Przemysław Frankowski	3	9
7	(United States) Djordje Mihailovic	3	1
8	(Germany) Fabian Herbers	3	
9	(United States) Dax McCarty	1	3
9	(Germany) Bastian Schweinsteiger	1	3
11	(United States) Brandt Bronico	1	2
12	(Canada) Raheem Edwards	1	
13	(Netherlands) Johan Kappelhof		2
14	(England) Mo Adams		1
14	(United States) Jeremiah Gutjahr		1

=== Cards ===
MLS Regular Season
Rank	Player	Yellow card	(yellow card) (yellow-red card)	Red card	Matches Missed
1	(Cuba) Jorge Luis Corrales	4		1	March 16 vs Seattle Sounders
2	(Serbia) Aleksandar Katai	2		1	August 17 vs Philadelphia Union; August 24 vs New England
3	(Argentina) Nicolás Gaitán	2		1	Suspension lifted
4	(Germany) Bastian Schweinsteiger	10			May 18 vs San Jose Earthquakes; July 13 vs FC Cincinnati
5	(England) Mo Adams	4			
5	(Netherlands) Johan Kappelhof				
5	(United States) Dax McCarty				
5	(United States) Djordje Mihailovic				
9	(Costa Rica) Francisco Calvo	3			
9	(Poland) Przemysław Frankowski	3			
9	(Hungary) Nemanja Nikolić	3			
9	(United States) C. J. Sapong	3			
13	(United States) Brandt Bronico	2			
13	(Canada) Raheem Edwards	2			
13	(Germany) Fabian Herbers	2			
16	(Uganda) Michael Azira	1			
16	(United States) Jonathan Bornstein	1			
16	(Costa Rica) Diego Campos	1			
16	(United States) Jeremiah Gutjahr	1			
16	(Brazil) Marcelo	1			

Rank	Player	Yellow card	(yellow card) (yellow-red card)	Red card	Matches Missed
1	(Netherlands) Johan Kappelhof	1			

Totals
Rank	Player	Yellow card	(yellow card) (yellow-red card)	Red card	Matches Missed
1	(Cuba) Jorge Luis Corrales	4		1	March 16 vs Seattle Sounders
2	(Serbia) Aleksandar Katai	2		1	August 17 vs Philadelphia Union; August 24 vs New England
3	(Argentina) Nicolás Gaitán	2		1	Suspension lifted
4	(Germany) Bastian Schweinsteiger	10			May 18 vs San Jose Earthquakes; July 13 vs FC Cincinnati
5	(Netherlands) Johan Kappelhof	5			
6	(England) Mo Adams	4			
6	(United States) Dax McCarty				
6	(United States) Djordje Mihailovic				
9	(Costa Rica) Francisco Calvo	3			
9	(Poland) Przemysław Frankowski	3			
9	(Hungary) Nemanja Nikolić	3			
9	(United States) C. J. Sapong	3			
13	(United States) Brandt Bronico	2			
13	(Canada) Raheem Edwards	2			
13	(Germany) Fabian Herbers	2			
16	(Uganda) Michael Azira	1			
16	(United States) Jonathan Bornstein	1			
16	(Costa Rica) Diego Campos	1			
16	(United States) Jeremiah Gutjahr	1			
16	(Brazil) Marcelo	1			

Note: Italics indicates a player who left during the season

== Player Awards ==
=== Fire Awards ===
Man of the Match Awards

Game #	Player	Position	Notable Statistics	Reference
1	(Denmark) David Ousted	GK	3 SV, 2 GA	
2	(United States) C. J. Sapong	MF	1 G, 1 SOG	
3	(Poland) Przemysław Frankowski	MF	1 A	
4	(England) Mo Adams	MF	2 tackles, 3 interceptions, 74% passing	
5	(United States) C. J. Sapong (2)	MF	1 G	
6	(United States) Dax McCarty	MF	4 key passes, 12 recoveries	
7	(Argentina) Nicolás Gaitán	MF	2 A	
8	(Denmark) David Ousted (2)	GK	2 SV, 1 GA	
9	(Netherlands) Johan Kappelhof	DF	7 recoveries, 1 tackle	
10	(Poland) Przemysław Frankowski (2)	DF	5 tackles	
11	(Hungary) Nemanja Nikolić	FW	2 goals	
12	(Netherlands) Johan Kappelhof (2)	DF	1 A	
13	No player named			
14	(United States) C. J. Sapong (3)	F	1 G	
15	(Argentina) Nicolás Gaitán (2)	MF	1 A	
16	No player named			
17	(Serbia) Aleksandar Katai	MF	1 G	
18	No player named			
19	(Argentina) Nicolás Gaitán (3)	MF	1 G, 3 A	
20	No player named			
21	(United States) Dax McCarty (2)	MF		
22	(Netherlands) Johan Kappelhof (2)	DF		
23	No player named			
24	(Netherlands) Johan Kappelhof (3)	DF		
25	(United States) Kenneth Kronholm	GK	4 SV	
26	(Germany) Bastian Schweinsteiger	MF	1 G	
27	(Hungary) Nemanja Nikolić (2)	FW	1 G	
28	(Hungary) Nemanja Nikolić (3)	FW	2 G	
29	No player named			
30	(Poland) Przemysław Frankowski (3)	MF	1 G	
31	(United States) C. J. Sapong (4)	MF	2 G	
32	(Costa Rica) Francisco Calvo	DF		
33				
34				

=== MLS Player of the Week ===
Week	Player	Stats	Report
11	(Argentina) Nicolás Gaitán	2 G, 2 A, 2 wins	

=== MLS Team of the Week ===
Week	Player	Position	Report
5	(Germany) Bastian Schweinsteiger	D	
5	(United States) Dax McCarty	Bench	
6	(Serbia) Aleksandar Katai	M	
7	(Germany) Bastian Schweinsteiger (2)	D	
8	(Argentina) Nicolás Gaitán	Bench	
10	(United States) Dax McCarty (2)	Bench	
11	(Costa Rica) Francisco Calvo	D	
11	(Argentina) Nicolás Gaitán (2)	M	
11	(Serbia) Aleksandar Katai (2)	Bench	
18	(Argentina) Nicolás Gaitán (3)	Bench	
18	(United States) C. J. Sapong	Bench	
22	(Argentina) Nicolás Gaitán (4)	Bench	
23	(Germany) Bastian Schweinsteiger (3)	D	
24	(Hungary) Nemanja Nikolić	F	
26	(Poland) Przemysław Frankowski	Bench	
28	(Poland) Przemysław Frankowski (2)	M	
28	(United States) C. J. Sapong (2)	Bench	
31	(Poland) Przemysław Frankowski (3)	M	

== Affiliate Loans ==
Nelson Rodriguez announced on January 8, 2019, that the Fire's affiliation with Tulsa had ended, and that they'd affiliate with Indy Eleven in the USL Championship and Lansing Ignite in USL League One for the year. The following players were loaned to either team above:

Date	Player	Position	Destination Club	Return Date	Ref
March 1, 2019	(Canada) Raheem Edwards	D/M/F	Lansing	March 16, 2019	
May 16, 2019	(United States) Stefan Cleveland	G	Lansing		
May 16, 2019	(United States) Grant Lillard	D	Lansing		
May 24, 2019	(Costa Rica) Diego Campos	D/M	Lansing		

== National team call-ups ==
Armenia
Yura Movsisyan

- UEFA Nations League Match vs Gibraltar, November 16, 2018 (Started, played 70 minutes, scored four goals)
- UEFA Nations League Match vs Liechtenstein, November 19, 2018 (Started, played 90 minutes)

Canada
Raheem Edwards

- 2019 CONCACAF Gold Cup Preliminary Roster

Costa Rica
Francisco Calvo

- Friendly vs Peru, June 5, 2019 (Did not play)
- 2019 CONCACAF Gold Cup Match vs Nicaragua, June 16, 2019 (Did not play)
- 2019 CONCACAF Gold Cup Match vs Bermuda, June 20, 2019 (Did not play)
- 2019 CONCACAF Gold Cup Match vs Haiti, June 24, 2019 (Started, played 90 minutes)
- 2019 CONCACAF Gold Cup Match vs Mexico, June 29, 2019 (Subbed on, played 21 minutes)
- Friendly vs Uruguay, September 6 (Did not play)

Liechtenstein
Nicolas Hasler

- UEFA Nations League Match vs Macedonia, November 16, 2018 (Started, played 90 minutes)
- UEFA Nations League Match vs Armenia, November 19, 2018 (Started, played 90 minutes, scored one goal)
- Euro 2020 Qualifying Match vs Greece, March 23, 2019 (Started, played 86 minutes)
- Euro 2020 Qualifying Match vs Italy, March 26, 2019 (Started, played 90 minutes)

Panama national under-23 football team
Cristian Martínez

Poland
Przemysław Frankowski

- Euro 2020 Qualifying Match vs Austria, March 21 (Subbed on, played 45 minutes)
- Euro 2020 Qualifying Match vs Latvia, March 24 (Subbed on, played 7 minutes)
- Euro 2020 Qualifying Match vs North Macedonia, June 7 (Started, played 46 minutes))
- Euro 2020 Qualifying Match vs Israel, June 10 (Did not play)

Serbia
Aleksandar Katai

- Euro 2020 Qualifying Match vs Ukraine, June 7 (Did not play)
- Euro 2020 Qualifying Match vs Lithuania, June 10 (Subbed on, played 3 minutes, 1 assist)
- Euro 2020 Qualifying Match vs Portugal, September 7 (Subbed on, played 7 minutes)
- Euro 2020 Qualifying Match vs Luxembourg, September 10 (Started, played 46 minutes)

(United States) United States
Senior Team
Djordje Mihailovic

- Friendly vs Panama, January 27, 2019 (Started, played 62 minutes, scored one goal)
- Friendly vs Costa Rica, February 2, 2019 (Started, played 63 minutes)
- Friendly vs Jamaica, June 5, 2019 (Started, played 90 minutes)
- 2019 CONCACAF Gold Cup Match vs Guyana, June 18, 2019 (Subbed on, played 16 minutes)
- 2019 CONCACAF Gold Cup Match vs Trinidad and Tobago, June 22, 2019 (Did not play)
- 2019 CONCACAF Gold Cup Match vs Panama, June 26, 2019 (Started, played 90 minutes)
- 2019 CONCACAF Gold Cup Match vs Curaçao, June 30, 2019 (Did not play)
- 2019 CONCACAF Gold Cup Match vs Jamaica, July 3, 2019 (Did not play)
- 2019 CONCACAF Gold Cup Final vs Mexico, July 7, 2019 (Did not play)

U-23 Team
Djordje Mihailovic

- Friendly vs Egypt, March 22, 2019 (Started, played 45 minutes)
- Friendly vs Netherlands, March 24, 2019 (Started, played 90 minutes)
- Friendly vs Japan, September 9 (Started, played 90 minutes)

U-15 Team
Gabriel Slonina

- Torneo delle Nazioni group stage match vs India, April 28, 2019 (Started, played 90 minutes, clean sheet)
- Torneo delle Nazioni group stage match vs Slovenia, April 29, 2019 (Did not play)
- Torneo delle Nazioni group stage match vs Mexico, April 30, 2019 (Started, played 90 minutes)
- Torneo delle Nazioni 9th-12th consolation match qualifier vs England, May 2, 2019 (Did not play)
- Torneo delle Nazioni 9th consolation match vs Norway, May 4, 2019

Note: Italics indicates player left after his first call up
