= 2018 Chicago Fire season =

Chicago Fire
2018 season
- Chairman: Andrew Hauptman
- Head coach: Veljko Paunović
- Stadium: Toyota Park (capacity: 20,000)
- MLS: Conference: 10th Overall: 20th
- MLS Cup Playoffs: Did not qualify
- U.S. Open Cup: Semifinals
- Brimstone Cup: Lost
- Top goalscorer: League: Nemanja Nikolić, 15 goals All: Nemanja Nikolić, 19 goals
- Highest home attendance: League: 21,915 (April 14 vs. LA Galaxy)
- Lowest home attendance: 8,551
- Average home league attendance: 14,516
- Biggest win: CHI 4-0 ORL (9/16)
- Biggest defeat: TOR 3-0 CHI (7/28)
Home colors	Away colors

The 2018 Chicago Fire season was the club's 20th year of existence, as well as their 21st in Major League Soccer.

== Current squad ==
As of August 10, 2018. Source: Chicago Fire official roster and Official MLS Roster

No.	Name	Nationality	Position	Date of birth (age)	Previous club	Player Notes
Goalkeepers
30	Stefan Cleveland	(United States)	GK	May 25, 1994 (age 32)	(United States) University of Louisville	Loaned Out
32	Patrick McLain	(United States)	GK	August 22, 1988 (age 37)	(United States) Minnesota United FC	
45	Richard Sánchez	(Mexico)	GK	May 5, 1994 (age 32)	(Mexico) Tigres UANL	
Defenders
2	Matt Polster	(United States)	D/M	June 8, 1993 (age 32)	(United States) SIU Edwardsville Cougars	
3	Brandon Vincent	(United States)	D	May 1, 1994 (age 32)	(United States) Stanford Cardinal	
4	Johan Kappelhof	(Netherlands)	D	August 5, 1990 (age 35)	(Netherlands) FC Groningen	
15	Grant Lillard	(United States)	D	December 5, 1995 (age 30)	(United States) Indiana Hoosiers	Homegrown
16	Jonathan Campbell	(United States)	D	June 27, 1993 (age 32)	(United States) North Carolina Tar Heels	
22	Nicolas Hasler	(Liechtenstein)	D/M	May 4, 1991 (age 35)	(Canada) Toronto FC	International
24	Nicolás Del Grecco	(Argentina)	D	November 19, 1994 (age 31)	(Honduras) C.D. Olimpia	International; Loaned Out
25	Jorge Luis Corrales	(Cuba)	D	May 20, 1991 (age 35)	(United States) Tulsa Roughnecks	
26	Christian Dean	(United States)	D	March 14, 1993 (age 33)	(Canada) Vancouver Whitecaps FC	
Midfielders
6	Dax McCarty (Captain)	(United States)	M	April 30, 1987 (age 39)	(United States) New York Red Bulls	
7	Raheem Edwards	(Canada)	M/D	July 17, 1995 (age 30)	(Canada) Montreal Impact	International
10	Aleksandar Katai	(Serbia)	M	February 6, 1991 (age 35)	(Spain) Deportivo Alavés	International
13	Brandt Bronico	(United States)	M	June 20, 1995 (age 30)	(United States) University of North Carolina Charlotte	
14	Djordje Mihailovic	(United States)	M	November 10, 1998 (age 27)	(United States) Chicago Fire Academy	Homegrown
18	Drew Conner	(United States)	M	February 18, 1994 (age 32)	(United States) Wisconsin Badgers	Homegrown
19	Mo Adams	(England)	M	September 23, 1996 (age 29)	(United States) Syracuse	Generation Adidas; International
20	Daniel Johnson	(United States)	M	September 8, 1995 (age 30)	(United States) University of Louisville	
31	Bastian Schweinsteiger	(Germany)	M	August 1, 1984 (age 41)	(England) Manchester United	Designated Player; International
Forwards
5	Yura Movsisyan	(Armenia)	F	August 2, 1987 (age 38)	(Sweden) Djurgårdens IF Fotboll	
8	Michael de Leeuw	(Netherlands)	F	October 7, 1986 (age 39)	(Netherlands) FC Groningen	International
9	Luis Solignac	(Argentina)	F	February 16, 1991 (age 35)	(United States) Colorado Rapids	International
17	Diego Campos	(Costa Rica)	F	October 1, 1995 (age 30)	(United States) Clemson	International; Loaned Out
21	Alan Gordon	(United States)	F	October 16, 1981 (age 44)	(United States) Colorado Rapids	
23	Nemanja Nikolić	(Hungary)	F	December 31, 1987 (age 38)	(Poland) Legia Warsaw	Designated Player; International
28	Elliot Collier	(New Zealand)	F	February 22, 1995 (age 31)	(United States) Loyola Chicago	International; Loaned Out

== Player movement ==
=== In ===
Date	Player	Position	Previous club	Notes	Ref
November 28, 2017	(El Salvador) Arturo Álvarez	M	(United States) Chicago Fire	Option was exercised	
November 28, 2017	(Armenia) David Arshakyan	F	(United States) Chicago Fire	Option was exercised	
November 28, 2017	(Uruguay) Jorge Bava	GK	(United States) Chicago Fire	Option was exercised	
November 28, 2017	(United States) Brandt Bronico	M	(United States) Chicago Fire	Option was exercised	
November 28, 2017	(United States) Jonathan Campbell	D	(United States) Chicago Fire	Option was exercised	
November 28, 2017	(United States) Stefan Cleveland	GK	(United States) Chicago Fire	Option was exercised	
November 28, 2017	(United States) Drew Conner	M	(United States) Chicago Fire	Option was exercised	
November 28, 2017	(United States) Daniel Johnson	M	(United States) Chicago Fire	Option was exercised	
November 28, 2017	(United States) Dax McCarty	M	(United States) Chicago Fire	Option was exercised	
November 28, 2017	(United States) Matt Polster	D	(United States) Chicago Fire	Option was exercised	
November 28, 2017	(United States) Brandon Vincent	D	(United States) Chicago Fire	Option was exercised	
January 10, 2018	(United States) Grant Lillard	D	(United States) Indiana Hoosiers	Signed as a homegrown player through 2019 with options for 2020 and 2021	
January 15, 2018	(Mexico) Richard Sánchez	GK	(United States) Chicago Fire	Re-Signed after his contract was initially declined; signed through 2019 with an option for 2020.	
January 17, 2018	(Germany) Bastian Schweinsteiger	M	(United States) Chicago Fire	Signed a new one-year contract after his original expired.	
January 18, 2018	(Portugal) Rafael Ramos	D	(United States) Orlando City S.C.	Acquired from Orlando City, along with $100,000 in allocation money, for the rights to Fire homegrown prospect Cameron Lindley.	
January 19, 2018	(Spain) Jon Bakero	F	(United States) Wake Forest	Acquired via the 5th overall pick in the SuperDraft after signing an MLS contract	
January 19, 2018	(England) Mo Adams	M	(United States) Syracuse	Acquired via the 10th overall pick in the SuperDraft after signing a Generation Adidas contract	
February 28, 2018	(Cameroon) Tony Tchani	M	(Canada) Vancouver Whitecaps FC	Acquired from Vancouver in exchange for $150,000 in TAM	
February 28, 2018	(Costa Rica) Diego Campos	F	(United States) Clemson	Signed to a contract for 2018 with options for 2019, 2020, and 2021, after being selected with the 38th overall pick in the SuperDraft	
February 28, 2018	(New Zealand) Elliot Collier	F	(United States) Loyola Chicago	Signed to a contract for 2018 with options for 2019, 2020, and 2021, after being selected with the 49th overall pick in the SuperDraft	
March 9, 2018	(United States) Kevin Ellis	D	(United States) Sporting Kansas City	Signed to a contract for 2018 with an option for 2019	
March 9, 2018	(United States) Patrick McLain	GK	(United States) Minnesota United FC	Signed to a contract for 2018 with an option for 2019 and 2020	
March 16, 2018	(United States) Alan Gordon	F	(United States) Colorado Rapids	Signed for the 2018 season	
July 11, 2018	(Serbia) Aleksandar Katai	M	(Spain) Deportivo Alavés	Permanently signed through 2019 with an option for 2020	
July 12, 2018	(Argentina) Nicolás Del Grecco	D	(Honduras) C.D. Olimpia	Signed for an undisclosed amount through 2019 with an option for 2020	
July 17, 2018	(Canada) Raheem Edwards	M/D	(Canada) Montreal Impact	Acquired in exchange for $400k in TAM	
July 20, 2018	(Liechtenstein) Nicolas Hasler	D/M	(Canada) Toronto FC	Acquired in exchange for $50k in GAM and Jon Bakero	
September 14, 2018	(Armenia) Yura Movsisyan	F	(Sweden) Djurgårdens IF Fotboll	Signed off of waivers	

=== Out ===
Date	Player	Position	Destination Club	Notes	Ref
November 18, 2017	(Portugal) João Meira	D/M	(Spain) Lorca FC	After his contract expired, he announced that he wouldn't be returning to the Fire	
November 28, 2017	(United States) Joey Calistri	M	(United States) St. Louis FC	Option was declined	
November 28, 2017	(Croatia) Matej Dekovic	D		Option was declined	
November 28, 2017	(United States) Patrick Doody	D	Retired	Option was declined; on February 13, he announced his retirement.	
November 28, 2017	(United States) / (Peru) Collin Fernandez	M	(United States) Phoenix Rising FC	Option was declined	
November 28, 2017	(Netherlands) John Goossens	M	(Netherlands) ADO Den Haag	Option was declined	
November 28, 2017	(United States) Michael Harrington	D	(United States) North Carolina FC	Option was declined	
November 28, 2017	(Brazil) Juninho	M	(Mexico) Club Tijuana	Loan was not extended	
November 28, 2017	(Mexico) Richard Sánchez	G	(United States) Chicago Fire	Option was declined	
November 28, 2017	(Germany) Bastian Schweinsteiger	M	(United States) Chicago Fire	Out of Contract	
December 10, 2017	(El Salvador) Arturo Álvarez	M	(United States) Houston Dynamo	Traded to Houston for Houston's natural second round selection in the 2019 MLS SuperDraft	
December 18, 2018	(Armenia) David Arshakyan	F	(Denmark) Vejle Boldklub	Mutually parted ways	
January 14, 2018	(Uruguay) Jorge Bava	GK	(Uruguay) Liverpool F.C.	Mutually parted ways	
January 19, 2018	(United States) Matt Lampson	GK	(United States) Minnesota United FC	Traded along with $175 thousand in allocation money to Minnesota for the fifth overall pick in the SuperDraft	
January 19, 2018	(Ghana) David Accam	MF	(United States) Philadelphia Union	Traded for $1.2 million in allocation money over 2018 and 2019	
July 20, 2018	(Spain) Jon Bakero	FW	(Canada) Toronto FC	Traded with $50K in GAM for Nicolas Hasler	
August 6, 2018	(Portugal) Rafael Ramos	DF	(Netherlands) FC Twente	Contract was mutually terminated	
August 9, 2018	(United States) Kevin Ellis	DF	(United States) D.C. United	Waived	
August 9, 2018	(Cameroon) Tony Tchani	MF		Waived	

=== Loaned in ===
Date	Player	Position	Original Club	Loan Ended	Ref
February 6, 2018	(Serbia) Aleksandar Katai	MF	(Spain) Deportivo Alavés	July 11, 2018	

=== Loaned out ===
Date	Player	Position	Destination Club	Loan Ended	Ref
August 10, 2018	(Costa Rica) Diego Campos	FW	(United States) Indy Eleven	End of season	
August 10, 2018	(New Zealand) Elliot Collier	FW	(United States) Indy Eleven	End of season	

=== Unsigned trialists and draft picks ===
Pre-Season

- Midfielder (United States) Omar Castro
- Midfielder/Forward (United States) Joshua Gatt, last played for Colorado Rapids; left the team on February 26
- Goalkeeper (United States) Sam Howard, last played for IFK Åmål in Sweden; left the team on February 19
- Defender Maxi Moreira, last played for Huracán F.C. in Uruguay
- Defender (United States) Josh Morton from California, picked 84th overall in the SuperDraft; was not part of the starting camp roster
- Forward (Spain) Albert Ruiz, last played for Florida Gulf Coast Eagles after not being selected in the SuperDraft; left camp sometime after the game against Kansas City

Academy midfielders Gilberto Angeles and Javier Casas also trained with the Fire while they were in Florida. Academy goalie Kyle Orciuch trained once they got back to Chicago after their travel to Bradenton as well.

== Technical staff ==
Position	Staff
General Manager	(United States) Nelson Rodríguez
Head Coach	(Serbia) Veljko Paunović
Assistant Coach	(Serbia) Marko Mitrović
Assistant Coach	(United States) Eric Gehrig
Goalkeeper Coach	(Serbia) Aleksandar Sarić
Senior Director of Soccer Operations	Eddie Rock
Strength and Conditioning Coach	Raphael Fevre
Massage Therapist	Steven Burrows
Director of Scouting	Matt Pearson
Video Analyst	Nenad Babic
Manager of Team and Soccer Operations	Alex Boler
Equipment Manager	Brian Sauer
Assistant Equipment Manager	Juan Arreola
Head Athletic Trainer	Steven Purcell
Assistant Athletic Trainer	Reade Whitney
Chief Medical Officer	Dr. Joshua Blomgren, D.O.
Head Orthopedic Officer	Dr. Brian Forsythe, M.D.
Physical Therapist	Ryan Perry

Last updated: October 30, 2017
Source: Chicago Fire Technical Staff

== Standings ==
=== Eastern Conference table ===
Pos	Team	Pld	W	L	T	GF	GA	GD	Pts	Qualification
1	New York Red Bulls	34	22	7	5	62	33	+29	71	MLS Cup Conference Semifinals
2	Atlanta United FC	34	21	7	6	70	44	+26	69	MLS Cup Conference Semifinals
3	New York City FC	34	16	10	8	59	45	+14	56	MLS Cup Knockout Round
4	D.C. United	34	14	11	9	60	50	+10	51	MLS Cup Knockout Round
5	Columbus Crew	34	14	11	9	43	45	−2	51	MLS Cup Knockout Round
6	Philadelphia Union	34	15	14	5	49	50	−1	50	MLS Cup Knockout Round
7	Montreal Impact	34	14	16	4	47	53	−6	46	
8	New England Revolution	34	10	13	11	49	55	−6	41	
9	Toronto FC	34	10	18	6	59	64	−5	36	
10	Chicago Fire	34	8	18	8	48	61	−13	32	
11	Orlando City SC	34	8	22	4	43	74	−31	28	

Source: MLS

=== Overall table ===
Pos	Team	Pld	W	L	T	GF	GA	GD	Pts	Qualification
1	New York Red Bulls (S)	34	22	7	5	62	33	+29	71	CONCACAF Champions League
2	Atlanta United FC (C)	34	21	7	6	70	44	+26	69	CONCACAF Champions League
3	Sporting Kansas City	34	18	8	8	65	40	+25	62	CONCACAF Champions League
4	Seattle Sounders FC	34	18	11	5	52	37	+15	59	
5	Los Angeles FC	34	16	9	9	68	52	+16	57	
6	FC Dallas	34	16	9	9	52	44	+8	57	
7	New York City FC	34	16	10	8	59	45	+14	56	
8	Portland Timbers	34	15	10	9	54	48	+6	54	
9	D.C. United	34	14	11	9	60	50	+10	51	
10	Columbus Crew	34	14	11	9	43	45	−2	51	
11	Philadelphia Union	34	15	14	5	49	50	−1	50	
12	Real Salt Lake	34	14	13	7	55	58	−3	49	
13	LA Galaxy	34	13	12	9	66	64	+2	48	
14	Vancouver Whitecaps FC	34	13	13	8	54	67	−13	47	
15	Montreal Impact	34	14	16	4	47	53	−6	46	
16	New England Revolution	34	10	13	11	49	55	−6	41	
17	Houston Dynamo	34	10	16	8	58	58	0	38	CONCACAF Champions League
18	Minnesota United FC	34	11	20	3	49	71	−22	36	
19	Toronto FC	34	10	18	6	59	64	−5	36	CONCACAF Champions League
20	Chicago Fire	34	8	18	8	48	61	−13	32	
21	Colorado Rapids	34	8	19	7	36	63	−27	31	
22	Orlando City SC	34	8	22	4	43	74	−31	28	
23	San Jose Earthquakes	34	4	21	9	49	71	−22	21	

Source: MLS
Rules for classification: 1) points; 2) total wins; 3) total goal differential; 4) total goals scored; 5) disciplinary points; 6) away goals scored; 7) away goal differential; 8) coin toss or drawing of lots
(C) MLS Cup Champion; (S) Supporters' Shield

=== Results summary ===
Overall								Home						Away					
Pld	Pts	W	L	T	GF	GA	GD	W	L	T	GF	GA	GD	W	L	T	GF	GA	GD
33	31	8	18	7	48	61	−13	6	7	3	28	25	+3	2	11	4	20	36	−16

Source: MLSsoccer.com standings
Pld = Matches played; Pts = Points; W = Matches won; T = Matches tied; L = Matches lost; GF = Goals for; GA = Goals against; GD = Goal difference

== Match results ==
Win Tie Loss

=== Preseason ===
Kickoff times are in CST (UTC−06)

February 3, 2018	South Florida Bulls	0–2	Chicago Fire	Tampa, Florida
16:00		Report	Mo Adams (yellow card) 14'; Nemanja Nikolić 40'; Elliot Collier 76'	Stadium: USF Soccer Stadium

February 8, 2018	Philadelphia Union	0–0	Chicago Fire	Clearwater, Florida
10:00	Alejandro Bedoya (yellow card) 42'	Report	Gilberto Angeles (yellow card) 79'	Stadium: Joe DiMaggio Sports Complex

February 14, 2018	Montreal Impact	2–1	Chicago Fire	Bradenton, Florida
18:00	Ignacio Piatti 34'; Matteo Mancosu 42'; Ken Krolicki (yellow card) 54'; Daniel Lovitz (yellow card) 70'	Report	Grant Lillard (yellow card) 41'; Dax McCarty 55'; Christian Dean (yellow card) 87'; Omar Castro (yellow card) 89'	Stadium: IMG Academy

February 17, 2018	Florida Gulf Coast Eagles	0–2	Chicago Fire	Bradenton, Florida
		Report	Omar Castro 19'; Albert Ruiz 27'	Stadium: IMG Academy

February 21, 2018	Nashville SC	0–0	Chicago Fire	Bradenton, Florida
15:00	Michael Cox (yellow card) 50'	Report	Christian Dean (yellow card) 39'	Stadium: IMG Academy

March 3, 2018	Chicago Fire	2–1	Tulsa Roughnecks	Bridgeview, Illinois
12:00	Tony Tchani (yellow card) 54'; Johan Kappelhof (yellow card) 57'; Nemanja Nikolić 69'; Elliot Collier 78'	Report	Jhon Pirez 16', (yellow card) 66'; Michael Gamble (yellow card) 25'	Stadium: Toyota Park

=== Major League Soccer ===
Kickoff times are in CST (UTC−06)

March 10, 2018 1	Chicago Fire	3–4	Sporting Kansas City	Bridgeview, Illinois
17:00	Kappelhof (yellow card) 36'; Schweinsteiger (yellow card) 50'; Katai 70'; Nikolić 74', 82'	Report	Gutiérrez 9', 86'; Melia (yellow card) 33'; Russell 44'; Sanchez (yellow card) 56'; Medranda 83'	Stadium: Toyota Park; Attendance: 14,021; Referee: Jose Carlos Rivero

March 17, 2018 2	Minnesota United FC	2–1	Chicago Fire	Minneapolis, Minnesota
13:00	Ibarra 55'; Nicholson 66'; Mears (yellow card) 90+2'	Report	Collier 58'; Ellis (yellow card) 60'; Tchani (yellow card) 67'	Stadium: TCF Bank Stadium; Attendance: 23,138; Referee: Alex Chilowicz

March 31, 2018 3	Chicago Fire	2–2	Portland Timbers	Bridgeview, Illinois
17:00	Katai (yellow card) 12'; Nikolić 50'; Vincent 84'	Report	Valeri 6', (yellow card) 52'; Blanco 55'	Stadium: Toyota Park; Attendance: 13,678; Referee: Drew Fischer

April 7, 2018 4	Chicago Fire	1–0	Columbus Crew	Bridgeview, Illinois
19:30	Kappelhof (yellow card) 6'; Nikolić 27', (yellow card) 90+4'; Sánchez (yellow card) 90'	Report	Artur (yellow card) 47'	Stadium: Toyota Park; Attendance: 11,028; Referee: Jair Marrufo

April 14, 2018 5	Chicago Fire	0–1	LA Galaxy	Bridgeview, Illinois
14:30	Vincent (yellow card) 45'; Gordon (yellow card) 48'	Report	Alessandrini (yellow card) 35'; Ibrahimović 45+1'; Kitchen (yellow card) 77'; Cole (yellow card) 89'	Stadium: Toyota Park; Attendance: 21,915; Referee: Ted Unkel

April 21, 2018 6	New York Red Bulls	1–2	Chicago Fire	Harrison, New Jersey
13:00	Robles (yellow card) 68'; Wright-Phillips 81'	Report	Katai 30'; Nikolić 69' (pen.); Adams (yellow card) 90+2'	Stadium: Red Bull Arena; Attendance: 18,784; Referee: Robert Sibiga

April 28, 2018 7	Toronto FC	2–2	Chicago Fire	Toronto
14:00	Osorio 8'; Vázquez 22'; Hernandez (yellow card) 80'	Report	Schweinsteiger 69'; Katai (yellow card) 73'; Gordon 90+4'	Stadium: BMO Field; Attendance: 26,331; Referee: Alan Kelly

May 5, 2018 8	Chicago Fire	1–2	Atlanta United FC	Bridgeview, Illinois
17:00	Kappelhof (yellow card) 24'; Ellis 61'; Lillard (yellow card) 80'	Report	Barco 53', (yellow card) 73'; Pírez (yellow card) 65'; Villalba (yellow card) 90+5'	Stadium: Toyota Park; Attendance: 15,024; Referee: Drew Fischer

May 9, 2018 9	Chicago Fire	1–0	Montreal Impact	Bridgeview, Illinois
19:30	Vincent (yellow card) 66'; Adams (yellow card) 70'; Ellis 89'	Report	Petrasso (yellow card) 65'	Stadium: Toyota Park; Attendance: 10,067; Referee: Sorin Stoica

May 12, 2018 10	Columbus Crew	3–0	Chicago Fire	Columbus, Ohio
18:30	Higuain 28' (pen.); Zardes 50', 70', (yellow card) 57'	Report	Ellis (yellow card) 27'	Stadium: MAPFRE Stadium; Attendance: 11,108; Referee: Allen Chapman

May 20, 2018 11	Chicago Fire	2–3	Houston Dynamo	Bridgeview, Illinois
15:00	Nikolić 14'; Campos 16'; Adams (yellow card) 38'; Sánchez (yellow card) 83'; Ramos (yellow card) 90+1'	Report	Quioto 4', (yellow card) 79'; Elis 56' (pen.), 74' (yellow card) 80'; O. García (yellow card) 67'; Willis (yellow card) 90+6'	Stadium: Toyota Park; Attendance: 14,206; Referee: Silviu Petrescu

May 26, 2018 12	Orlando City SC	1–2	Chicago Fire	Orlando, Florida
18:30	El Monir (yellow card) 11'; Higuita 28'; Schuler (yellow card) 40'; Rosell (yellow card) 64'; Mueller (yellow card) 70'; Kljestan (yellow card) 90'	Report	Katai 13'; Ellis (yellow card) 45+1'; Gordon 82'; Adams (red card); Kappelhof (yellow card) 90+5'	Stadium: Orlando City Stadium; Attendance: 25,288; Referee: Nima Saghafi

May 30, 2018 13	Philadelphia Union	3–1	Chicago Fire	Chester, Pennsylvania
17:30	Ilsinho 44'; Burke 51'; Dočkal 87' (pen.)	Report	Corrales (yellow card) 32'; Gordon 56'	Stadium: Talen Energy Stadium; Attendance: 14,805; Referee: Fotis Bazakos

June 2, 2018 14	Chicago Fire	2–1	San Jose Earthquakes	Bridgeview, Illinois
19:30	Gordon 29'; Katai 49'; Corrales (yellow card) 57'	Report	Alashe (yellow card) 45+5'; Ockford (yellow card) 61'; Hoesen 74'	Stadium: Toyota Park; Attendance: 14,138; Referee: Ismail Elfath

June 9, 2018 15	Chicago Fire	1–1	New England Revolution	Bridgeview, Illinois
19:30	Schweinsteiger 63'	Report	Dielna (yellow card) 31'; Bunbury 82', (yellow card) 83'	Stadium: Toyota Park; Attendance: 14,415; Referee: Kevin Stott

June 13, 2018 16	Colorado Rapids	2–2	Chicago Fire	Commerce City, Colorado
20:00	Badji 7'; Smith 15'; Blomberg (yellow card) 56'	Report	Wilson 21' (o.g.); Katai 24'; Schweinsteiger (yellow card) 29'; Kappelhof (yellow card) 45+1', (red card) 84'; Campos (yellow card) 90+2'	Stadium: Dick's Sporting Goods Park; Attendance: 16,068; Referee: JC Rivero

June 23, 2018 17	Seattle Sounders FC	1–1	Chicago Fire	Seattle, Washington
21:00	Dempsey 22'; Roldan (yellow card) 87'; Tolo (yellow card) 90+1'	Report	Katai 9'; Schweinsteiger (yellow card) 44'; Campbell (yellow card) 61'; Collier (yellow card) 85'	Stadium: CenturyLink Field; Attendance: 39,513; Referee: Armando Villarreal

June 30, 2018 18	Chicago Fire	3–2	New York City FC	Bridgeview, Illinois
19:30	Nikolić 6'; Bronico (yellow card) 10'; Katai 47, 52'; Sánchez (yellow card) 89'; Gordon (yellow card) 90+1'	Report	Ring (yellow card) 28'; Tajouri-Shradi 36'; Berget 40'	Stadium: Toyota Park; Attendance: 15,204; Referee: Chris Penso

July 7, 2018 19	Vancouver Whitecaps FC	3–2	Chicago Fire	Vancouver, British Columbia
21:30	Kamara 28', 72'; Mutch 47'	Report	Vincent (yellow card) 10'; Nikolić 42'; Katai (yellow card) 67'; Tchani 80'	Stadium: BC Place Stadium; Attendance: 22,120; Referee: Robert Sibiga

July 11, 2018 20	Chicago Fire	3–4	Philadelphia Union	Bridgeview, Illinois
19:30	Corrales (yellow card) 5'; Nikolić 39' (pen.); Katai 69'; Kappelhof (yellow card) 83'; Schweinsteiger 90+4'	Report	Burke (yellow card) 7', (goal) 45+3', 73'; Medunjanin 31'; Accam 90+5', (yellow card) 90+6'	Stadium: Toyota Park; Attendance: 12,008; Referee: Dave Gantar

July 14, 2018 21	FC Dallas	3–1	Chicago Fire	Frisco, Texas
19:00	Gruezo 27'; Cannon (yellow card) 63'; Acosta 74'; Ziegler 81' (pen.)	Report	Conner (yellow card) 39' (yellow-red card); Bronico 86'	Stadium: Toyota Stadium; Attendance: 16,000; Referee: Marcos Deoliveira

July 21, 2018 22	Chicago Fire	1–2	Toronto FC	Bridgeview, Illinois
18:00	Corrales (yellow card) 45+1'; Nikolić 62'	Report	Mavinga (yellow card) 41'; Giovinco 47'; Morrow (yellow card) 61'; Osorio 65'	Stadium: Toyota Park; Attendance: 15,177; Referee: Sorin Stoica

July 28, 2018 23	Toronto FC	3–0	Chicago Fire	Toronto
18:00	Giovinco (yellow card) 42', (goal) 89'; Altidore 52'; Bradley (yellow card) 63'; Osorio 73'	Report	Bronico (yellow card) 30'	Stadium: BMO Field; Attendance: 29,190; Referee: Joseph Dickerson

August 4, 2018 24	Real Salt Lake	2–1	Chicago Fire	Sandy, Utah
21:00	Kreilach 45+3', 75'; Silva (yellow card) 90'	Report	Schweinsteiger 48', (yellow card) 90+6'; Conner (yellow card) 55'	Stadium: Rio Tinto Stadium; Attendance: 19,817; Referee: Kevin Stott

August 11, 2018 25	Chicago Fire	0–1	New York Red Bulls	Bridgeview, Illinois
19:30	Bronico (yellow card) 11'; McCarty (yellow card) 42'	Report	Wright-Phillips 55'; Rzatkowski (yellow card) 66'; Royer (yellow card) 74'; Muyl (yellow card) 76'; Murillo (yellow card) 89'	Stadium: Toyota Park; Attendance: 18,064; Referee: Nima Saghafi

August 18, 2018 26	Montreal Impact	2–1	Chicago Fire	Montreal, Quebec
18:30	Piatti 6' (pen.); Camacho (yellow card) 24'; Sagna (yellow card) 68'; Lovitz 90+1'	Report	Corrales (yellow card) 41'; Nikolić 70'; McCarty (yellow card) 80'	Stadium: Stade Saputo; Attendance: 18,831; Referee: Baldomero Toledo

August 23, 2018 27	Chicago Fire	1–1	Columbus Crew	Bridgeview, Illinois
18:00	de Leeuw (yellow card) 55'; Nikolić 67'; Katai (yellow card) 69'; Schweinsteiger (yellow card) 90+1'	Report	Higuaín (yellow card) 65'; Hansen 87'	Stadium: Toyota Park; Attendance: 8,551; Referee: Armando Villareal

September 16, 2018 28	Chicago Fire	4–0	Orlando City SC	Bridgeview, Illinois
16:00	Nikolić 3', 70'; Katai 28', (yellow card) 58' de Leeuw 56'	Report		Stadium: Toyota Park; Attendance: 16,287; Referee: Allen Chapman

September 22, 2018 29	New England Revolution	2–2	Chicago Fire	Foxborough, Massachusetts
18:30	Mlinar (yellow card) 31'; Bye (yellow card) 36'; Caldwell 62', (yellow card) 80'; Bunbury (yellow card) 69'; Penilla 70'	Report	Katai 19'; McCarty (yellow card) 58'; Mancienne 67' (o.g.); Kappelhof (yellow card) 78'	Stadium: Gillette Stadium; Attendance: 24,388; Referee: Joe Dickerson

September 26, 2018 30	New York City FC	2–0	Chicago Fire	New York City
18:00	Tajouri-Shradi (yellow card) 27'; Ring 47'; Villa 51'	Report		Stadium: Yankees Stadium; Attendance: 21,582; Referee: Jair Marrufo

September 29, 2018 31	Chicago Fire	3–1	Los Angeles FC	Bridgeview, Illinois
4:30	Mihailovic 20'; McCarty (yellow card) 24'; Nikolić 29' (pen.), (yellow card) 56'; Katai 66'; Bronico (yellow card) 79'; Kappelhof (yellow card) 90+3'	Report	Rossi 73'	Stadium: Toyota Park; Attendance: 18,471; Referee: Chris Penso

October 7, 2018 32	D.C. United	2–1	Chicago Fire	Washington, D.C.
12:00	Rooney 62', 81' (pen.)	Report	Edwards 51'; Schweinsteiger (yellow card) 90+4'	Stadium: Audi Field; Attendance: 20,064; Referee: Ismail Elfath

October 21, 2018 33	Atlanta United FC	2–1	Chicago Fire	Atlanta
2:00 PM EDT	Escobar 9'; Kappelhof 26' (o.g.); Remedi (yellow card) 81'	Report	de Leeuw 24'; Kappelhof (yellow card) 72'	Stadium: Mercedes-Benz Stadium; Attendance: 71,812; Referee: Drew Fischer

October 28, 2018 34	Chicago Fire	0–0	D.C. United	Bridgeview, Illinois
3:30 PM EDT	McCarty (yellow card) 54'; Schweinsteiger (yellow card) 79'	Report		Stadium: Toyota Park; Attendance: 19,459; Referee: Nima Saghafi

=== Open Cup ===
Kickoff times are in CST (UTC−06)

June 6, 2018 Fourth round	Columbus Crew	2–2 (a.e.t.) (9–10 p)	Chicago Fire	Columbus, Ohio
18:00	Cristian Martinez 10'; Eduardo Sosa (yellow card) 64'; Mohammed Abu (yellow card) 71'; Alex Crognale (yellow card) 107'; Jahn 114'	Report	Nemanja Nikolić 45', 109'; Rafael Ramos (yellow card) 81'; Dax McCarty (yellow card) 90+3'; Aleksandar Katai (yellow card) 112'	Stadium: MAPFRE Stadium; Attendance: 4,992; Referee: Marcos DeOliveira
	Penalties
	Valenzuela (penalty scored); Jiménez (penalty missed); Argudo (penalty scored); Abubakar (penalty scored); Jahn (penalty scored); Martinez (penalty scored); Crognale (penalty scored); Sosa (penalty scored); Abu (penalty scored); Opoku (penalty scored); Ketterer (penalty missed)		(penalty missed) Nikolić; (penalty scored) Katai; (penalty scored) McCarty; (penalty scored) Campos; (penalty scored) Schweinsteiger; (penalty scored) Bronico; (penalty scored) Lillard; (penalty scored) Corrales; (penalty scored) Ramos; (penalty scored) Campbell; (penalty scored) Sánchez

June 20, 2018 Round of 16	Atlanta United FC	0–1	Chicago Fire	Atlanta
18:30	Leandro González Pírez (yellow card) 81'	Report	Aleksandar Katai (yellow card) 39'; Nemanja Nikolić 54'	Stadium: Mercedes Benz Stadium; Attendance: 41,012; Referee: Rubiel Vazquez

July 18, 2018 Quarterfinals	Chicago Fire	4–0	Louisville City	Bridgeview, Illinois
19:30	Nikolić 16'; Aleksandar Katai 32'; Elliot Collier (yellow card) 86', (goal) 90+2'; Diego Campos 90'; Tony Tchani (yellow card) 90+4'	Report	Paco Craig (yellow card) 62'; Paolo DelPiccolo (yellow card) 64'; Kyle Smith (red card) 84'; Sean Totsch (yellow card) 89'; Magnus Rasmussen (red card) 90+3'	Stadium: Toyota Park; Attendance: 2,561

August 8, 2018 Semifinals	Philadelphia Union	3–0	Chicago Fire	Chester, Pennsylvania
7:00 p.m. EDT	Cory Burke 59', 77'; CJ Sapong 86'	Report	Aleksandar Katai (yellow card) 62'	Stadium: Talen Energy Stadium; Attendance: 7,934

=== International friendlies ===
Kickoff times are in CST (UTC−06)

August 28, 2018	(Germany) Bayern Munich	4–0	(United States) Chicago Fire	Munich, Germany
13:30	Serge Gnabry 7'; Sandro Wagner 38'; Arjen Robben 63'; Bastian Schweinsteiger 82'			Stadium: Allianz Arena

== Squad statistics ==
=== Games played ===
No.	Pos.	Nat.	Name	MLS			Open Cup			Total		
No.	Pos.	Nat.	Name	Starts	Apps	Minutes	Starts	Apps	Minutes	Starts	Apps	Minutes
2	DF/MF	USA	Matt Polster	1	2	106	0	0	0	1	1	89
3	DF	USA	Brandon Vincent	30	31	2,738	2	2	180	32	33	2,918
4	DF	NED	Johan Kappelhof	29	29	2,604	3	3	270	32	32	2,874
5	FW	ARM	Yura Movsisyan	0	3	45	0	0	0	0	3	45
6	MF	USA	Dax McCarty	25	25	2,169	3	4	305	28	29	2,474
7	M/D	CAN	Raheem Edwards	9	12	826	1	1	90	10	13	916
8	FW	NED	Michael de Leeuw	5	9	454	0	0	0	5	9	454
9	FW	ARG	Luis Solignac	8	11	702	2	2	155	10	13	857
10	MF	SER	Aleksandar Katai	26	32	2,338	3	4	294	28	36	2,632
13	MF	USA	Brandt Bronico	17	23	1,531	4	4	372	21	27	1,903
14	MF	USA	Djordje Mihailovic	7	8	512	0	0	0	7	8	512
15	DF	USA	Grant Lillard	6	8	562	1	1	120	7	9	682
16	DF	USA	Jonathan Campbell	10	14	915	2	3	217	12	17	1,132
17	FW	CRC	Diego Campos	12	22	1,107	3	3	275	15	25	1,382
18	MF	USA	Drew Conner	5	11	462	0	1	5	5	12	467
19	MF	ENG	Mo Adams	10	15	908	0	0	0	10	15	908
20	MF	USA	Daniel Johnson	3	7	261	1	1	79	4	8	340
21	FW	USA	Alan Gordon	7	22	799	0	2	19	7	24	818
22	DF	LIE	Nicolas Hasler	7	9	701	1	1	85	8	10	786
23	FW	HUN	Nemanja Nikolić	28	30	2,381	4	4	378	32	34	2,759
24	DF	ARG	Nicolás Del Grecco	0	0	0	0	0	0	0	0	0
25	DF	CUB	Jorge Luis Corrales	15	17	1,292	4	4	374	19	21	1,666
26	DF	USA	Christian Dean	2	2	178	0	0	0	2	2	178
28	FW	NZL	Elliot Collier	9	16	904	1	1	90	10	17	994
30	GK	USA	Stefan Cleveland	5	5	450	0	0	0	5	5	450
31	MF	GER	Bastian Schweinsteiger	29	30	2,636	3	4	319	32	34	2,955
32	GK	USA	Patrick McLain	4	4	314	0	0	0	4	4	314
45	GK	MEX	Richard Sánchez	24	25	2,207	4	4	390	28	28	2,597
	FW	ESP	Jon Bakero	1	4	75	0	0	0	1	4	75
	DF	USA	Kevin Ellis	19	20	1,537	0	2	41	19	22	1,578
	DF	POR	Rafael Ramos	1	3	105	1	2	136	2	5	241
	MF	CMR	Tony Tchani	9	13	825	1	3	106	10	16	731

=== Goalkeeping statistics ===
No.	Pos.	Nat.	Name	MLS			Open Cup			Total		
No.	Pos.	Nat.	Name	Clean sheets	Saves	GA	Clean sheets	Saves	GA	Clean sheets	Saves	GA
30	GK	USA	Stefan Cleveland	0	25	8	0	0	0	0	25	8
32	GK	USA	Patrick McLain	0	12	6	0	0	0	0	12	6
45	GK	MEX	Richard Sánchez	3	80	47	2	12	5	5	92	52

=== Goalscoring and assisting record ===
MLS Regular Season
Rank	Player	Goal	A
1	(Hungary) Nemanja Nikolić	15	2
2	(Serbia) Aleksandar Katai	12	5
3	(Germany) Bastian Schweinsteiger	4	6
4	(United States) Alan Gordon	4	0
5	(United States) Kevin Ellis	2	4
6	(Netherlands) Michael de Leeuw	2	2
7	(United States) Brandt Bronico	1	5
8	(United States) Brandon Vincent	1	4
9	(United States) Djordje Mihailovic	1	3
10	(Costa Rica) Diego Campos	1	2
10	(Canada) Raheem Edwards	1	2
12	(New Zealand) Elliot Collier	1	1
13	(Cameroon) Tony Tchani	1	0
14	(Netherlands) Johan Kappelhof	0	4
15	(United States) Dax McCarty	0	3
16	(United States) Jonathan Campbell	0	1
16	(United States) Drew Conner	0	1
16	(United States) Matt Polster	0	1
16	(Argentina) Luis Solignac	0	1

U.S. Open Cup
Rank	Player	Goal	A
1	(Hungary) Nemanja Nikolić	4	0
2	(Serbia) Aleksandar Katai	1	1
3	(Costa Rica) Diego Campos	1	0
3	(New Zealand) Elliot Collier	1	0
5	(Germany) Bastian Schweinsteiger	0	2
6	(Cuba) Jorge Luis Corrales	0	1
6	(Portugal) Rafael Ramos	0	1
6	(Argentina) Luis Solignac	0	1

All Competitions
Rank	Player	Goal	A
1	(Hungary) Nemanja Nikolić	19	2
2	(Serbia) Aleksandar Katai	13	6
3	(Germany) Bastian Schweinsteiger	4	8
4	(United States) Alan Gordon	4	0
5	(United States) Kevin Ellis	2	4
6	(Costa Rica) Diego Campos	2	2
6	(Netherlands) Michael de Leeuw	2	2
8	(New Zealand) Elliot Collier	2	1
9	(United States) Brandt Bronico	1	5
10	(United States) Brandon Vincent	1	4
11	(United States) Djordje Mihailovic	1	3
12	(Canada) Raheem Edwards	1	2
13	(Cameroon) Tony Tchani	1	0
14	(Netherlands) Johan Kappelhof	0	4
15	(United States) Dax McCarty	0	3
16	(Argentina) Luis Solignac	0	2
17	(United States) Jonathan Campbell	0	1
17	(Cuba) Jorge Luis Corrales	0	1
17	(United States) Drew Conner	0	1
17	(United States) Matt Polster	0	1
17	(Portugal) Rafael Ramos	0	1

=== Cards ===
MLS Regular Season
Rank	Player	Booked	(yellow card) (yellow-red card)	Sent off (straight red)	Matches Missed
1	(Netherlands) Johan Kappelhof	9	0	1	June 23 vs Seattle Sounders; June 30 vs New York City FC
2	(United States) Drew Conner	1	1	0	July 21 vs Toronto
3	(Serbia) Aleksandar Katai	6	0	0	
3	(Germany) Bastian Schweinsteiger	6	0	0	
5	(Cuba) Jorge Luis Corrales	5	0	0	
6	(United States) Brandt Bronico	4	0	0	
6	(United States) Kevin Ellis	4	0	0	
6	(United States) Dax McCarty	4	0	0	
9	(England) Mo Adams	3	0	0	(Note: While Adams was sent off against Orlando on May 26, his card was later removed by an independent panel)
9	(Mexico) Richard Sánchez	3	0	0	
9	(United States) Brandon Vincent	3	0	0	
12	(United States) Alan Gordon	2	0	0	
12	(Hungary) Nemanja Nikolić	2	0	0	
14	(United States) Jonathan Campbell	1	0	0	
14	(Costa Rica) Diego Campos	1	0	0	
14	(New Zealand) Elliot Collier	1	0	0	
14	(Netherlands) Michael de Leeuw	1	0	0	
14	(United States) Grant Lillard	1	0	0	
14	(Portugal) Rafael Ramos	1	0	0	
14	(Cameroon) Tony Tchani	1	0	0	

U.S. Open Cup
Rank	Player	Booked	(yellow card) (yellow-red card)	Sent off (straight red)	Matches Missed
1	(Serbia) Aleksandar Katai	3	0	0	
2	(New Zealand) Elliot Collier	1	0	0	
2	(United States) Dax McCarty	1	0	0	
2	(Portugal) Rafael Ramos	1	0	0	
2	(Cameroon) Tony Tchani	1	0	0	

All Competitions
Rank	Player	Booked	(yellow card) (yellow-red card)	Sent off (straight red)	Matches Missed
1	(Netherlands) Johan Kappelhof	9	0	1	June 23 vs Seattle Sounders; June 30 vs New York City FC; October 28 vs D.C. United
2	(United States) Drew Conner	1	1	0	July 21 vs Toronto
3	(Serbia) Aleksandar Katai	9	0	0	
4	(Germany) Bastian Schweinsteiger	6	0	0	
5	(Cuba) Jorge Luis Corrales	5	0	0	
5	(United States) Dax McCarty	5	0	0	
7	(United States) Brandt Bronico	4	0	0	
7	(United States) Kevin Ellis	4	0	0	
9	(England) Mo Adams	3	0	0	
9	(Mexico) Richard Sánchez	3	0	0	
9	(United States) Brandon Vincent	3	0	0	
12	(New Zealand) Elliot Collier	2	0	0	
12	(United States) Alan Gordon	2	0	0	
12	(Hungary) Nemanja Nikolić	2	0	0	
12	(Portugal) Rafael Ramos	2	0	0	
12	(Cameroon) Tony Tchani	2	0	0	
17	(United States) Jonathan Campbell	1	0	0	
17	(Costa Rica) Diego Campos	1	0	0	
17	(Netherlands) Michael de Leeuw	1	0	0	
17	(United States) Grant Lillard	1	0	0	

=== Notes ===
Player left during the season

== Awards ==
=== MLS Team of the Week ===
Week	Player	Position	Report
5	(Germany) Bastian Schweinsteiger	M	Report
6	(Germany) Bastian Schweinsteiger	D	Report
6	(Hungary) Nemanja Nikolić	Bench	Report
8	(Mexico) Richard Sánchez	GK	Report
8	(United States) Dax McCarty	Bench	Report
13	(United States) Alan Gordon	Bench	Report
13	(United States) Patrick McLain	Bench	Report
14	(United States) Alan Gordon	Bench	Report
15	(Netherlands) Johan Kappelhof	D	Report
16	(Serbia) Aleksandar Katai	M	Report
17	(Serbia) Aleksandar Katai	F	Report
17	(United States) Brandt Bronico	Bench	Report
18	(Serbia) Aleksandar Katai	F	Report
18	(United States) Dax McCarty	Bench	Report
26	(Hungary) Nemanja Nikolić	Bench	Report
29	(Hungary) Nemanja Nikolić	Bench	Report
31	(United States) Djordje Mihailovic	M	Report

=== MLS Goal of the week ===
Week	Player	Game	Score	Report
18	(Serbia) Aleksandar Katai	vs New York City FC	3-2	Report
31	(United States) Djordje Mihailovic	vs LAFC	1-0	Report

== Tulsa loanee statistics ==
The Fire renewed their affiliation with Tulsa for another season on January 12, 2018. The affiliation allows for players to be called back at any point or loaned out at any point.

=== Loaned out ===
The following players were loaned out during the season:

Player	Position	Notes	Ref
(United States) Stefan Cleveland	GK		
(Spain) Jon Bakero	FW	Traded to Toronto on July 20	
(Argentina) Nicolás Del Grecco	FW	Officially loaned out on August 10	
(England) Mo Adams	MF		

=== Games played ===
No.	Pos.	Nat.	Name	USL			Open Cup			Total		
No.	Pos.	Nat.	Name	Starts	Apps	Minutes	Starts	Apps	Minutes	Starts	Apps	Minutes
4	DF	(Argentina)	Nicolás Del Grecco	1	1	90	0	0	0	1	1	90
30	GK	(United States)	Stefan Cleveland	1	1	90	0	0	0	1	1	90
91	MF	(England)	Mo Adams	0	1	45	0	0	0	0	1	45
	FW	(Spain)	Jon Bakero	2	3	202	0	0	0	2	3	202

=== Goalscoring and assisting record ===
USL Regular Season
Rank	Player	Goal	A
	(Spain) Jon Bakero	2	1

=== Cards ===
USL Regular Season
Rank	Player	Booked	(yellow card) (yellow-red card)	Sent off (straight red)	Matches Missed
1	Nicolás Del Grecco	1	0	0	

=== Goalkeeping statistics ===
No.	Pos.	Nat.	Name	USL			Open Cup			Total		
No.	Pos.	Nat.	Name	Clean sheets	Saves	GA	Clean sheets	Saves	GA	Clean sheets	Saves	GA
30	GK	(United States)	Stefan Cleveland	0	4	2	0	0	0	0	4	2

=== Notes ===
Player left during the season

== National team call-ups ==
Armenia
Yura Movsisyan

- UEFA Nations League Match vs Gibraltar, October 13 (Started, played 69 minutes)
- UEFA Nations League Match vs Macedonia, October 16 (Started, played 74 minutes, scored one goal)

Hungary
Nemanja Nikolić

- Friendly vs Luxembourg, November 9, 2017 (Started, played 75 minutes, scored one goal)
- Friendly vs Costa Rica, November 14, 2017 (Started, played 81 minutes, scored one goal)
- Friendly vs Kazakhstan, March 23 (Started, played 76 minutes)
- Friendly vs Scotland, March 27 (Subbed on, played 7 minutes)

Liechtenstein
Nicolas Hasler

- UEFA Nations League Match vs Armenia, September 6 (Started, played 90 minutes, assisted one goal)
- UEFA Nations League Match vs Gibraltar, September 9 (Started, played 90 minutes)
- UEFA Nations League Match vs Macedonia, October 13 (Started, played 90 minutes)
- UEFA Nations League Match vs Gibraltar, October 16 (Started, played 90 minutes)

United States
Matt Polster

- Friendly vs Bosnia and Herzegovina, January 28 (Started, played 90 minutes)

Brandon Vincent

- Friendly vs Bosnia and Herzegovina, January 28 (Did not play)
