= Dax McCarty =

American soccer player (born 1987)

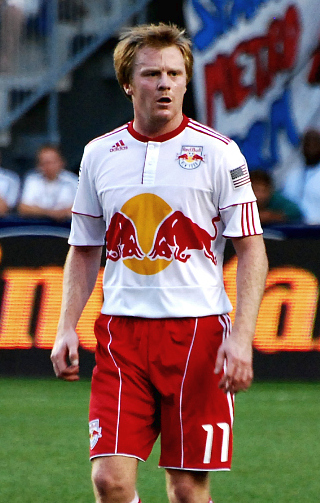
- McCarty with the New York Red Bulls in 2011

Personal information
- Full name: Michael Dax McCarty
- Date of birth: April 30, 1987 (age 39)
- Place of birth: Winter Park, Florida, United States
- Height: 5 ft 9 in (1.75 m)
- Position: Midfielder

College career
Years	Team	Apps	(Gls)
2004–2005	North Carolina Tar Heels	45	(4)

Senior career*
Years	Team	Apps	(Gls)
2006–2010	FC Dallas	93	(5)
2011	D.C. United	13	(0)
2011–2016	New York Red Bulls	169	(14)
2017–2019	Chicago Fire	86	(1)
2020–2023	Nashville SC	105	(2)
2024	Atlanta United	22	(0)
2025	Des Moines Menace	0	(0)
Total		488	(22)

International career
2007	United States U20	5	(0)
2008	United States U23	6	(0)
2009–2017	United States	13	(0)
- * Club domestic league appearances and goals

Michael Dax McCarty (born April 30, 1987) is an American former professional soccer player who played as a midfielder.

Beginning his professional career with FC Dallas in 2006, McCarty spent his entire career in Major League Soccer with six clubs, namely FC Dallas, D.C. United, New York Red Bulls (whom he won the 2013 and 2015 editions of the Supporter’s Shield with), Chicago Fire, Nashville SC, and finally Atlanta United, retiring from football with the latter at the end of the 2024 MLS season.

== Early life and career ==
McCarty was raised in Winter Park, Florida and attended Winter Park High School. During his early years, McCarty was a member of the United States Soccer Residency program and attended the Edison Soccer Academy in Bradenton, Florida. He was also a member of the Ajax Orlando Prospects in the USL Premier Development League the summer after his freshman year in college.

McCarty played college soccer at the University of North Carolina at Chapel Hill between 2004 and 2005. Over that span, he appeared in 45 games, scoring 4 goals and assisting on 11 others. In 2005, he was named to the All-ACC first team.

== Club career ==
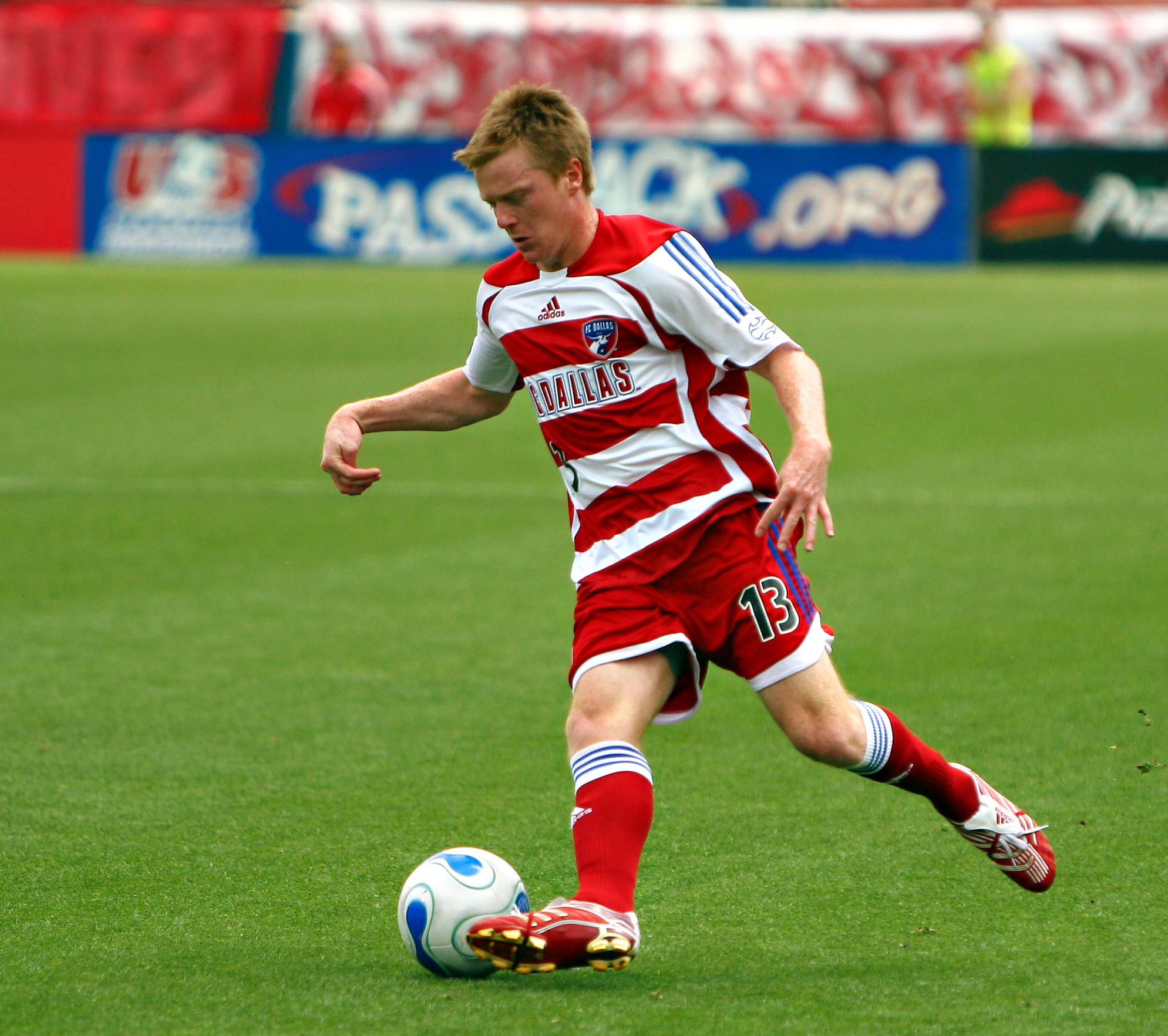
McCarty playing for FC Dallas in 2007

=== FC Dallas ===
Opting to forgo his last two years at North Carolina, he was drafted in the first round, 6th overall, of the 2006 MLS SuperDraft by FC Dallas. McCarty made his MLS debut in the 85th minute in a 3–0 loss against Chivas USA on July 1, 2006. Dax had his best season as a professional in 2007 making his first start against the Los Angeles Galaxy in a 2–1 victory on April 12, 2007, and scored his first career MLS goal against the Galaxy on September 23, 2007. McCarty featured in Dallas' 3–2 loss to the New England Revolution in the 2007 Lamar Hunt U.S. Open Cup Final. He finished the 2007 campaign leading the team with seven assists in 31 appearances throughout all competitions, including appearances in the 2007 North American SuperLiga. In 2008, McCarty was limited to only 17 games due to injury, but made eight starts for FC Dallas while recording two assists. In May, McCarty underwent sports hernia surgery in Germany during the middle of the season in hopes of speeding up his recovery time.

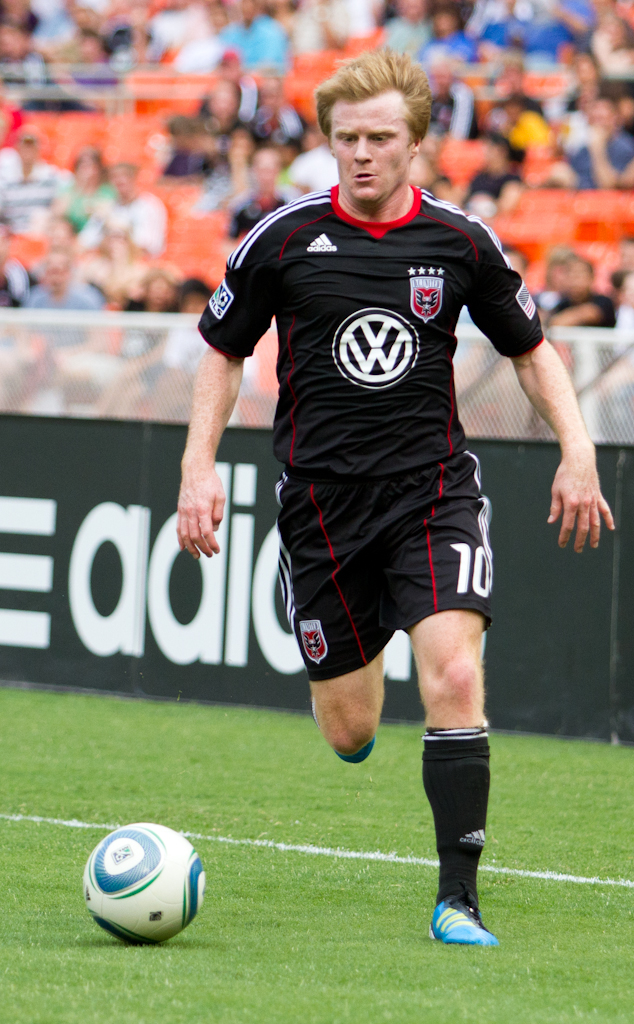
McCarty playing for D.C. United in 2011

McCarty played an important role in the FC Dallas 2009 season, sitting in central midfield as a deep playmaker. He recorded his best statistical season with the club scoring 3 goals and 6 assists. On November 11, head coach Schellas Hyndman made it a top priority to retain McCarty, signing him to a new deal. During the 2010 season McCarty was once again a key player for FC Dallas helping the club reach the MLS Cup Playoffs. On November 6, McCarty scored the winning goal against Real Salt Lake that clinched the series and sent Dallas to the Western Conference Finals. Dallas would go on to reach the MLS Cup 2010, where they lost 2–1 to the Colorado Rapids. He played the entire 120 minutes of the match in what would be his final game for Dallas.

=== D.C. United ===
On November 24, 2010, McCarty was selected by the Portland Timbers as their first pick in the 2010 MLS Expansion Draft, and then immediately traded with allocation money to D.C. United for Rodney Wallace and a fourth-round pick in the 2011 MLS SuperDraft. Then interim coach, Ben Olsen made McCarty a priority signing due to the similarities between Dax and his own style of play. On March 16, 2011, after only 4 months with the club, McCarty was named as the club's captain by Ben Olsen. McCarty made his first official appearance with the club in a 3–1 victory against the Columbus Crew during the season opener. After failing to perform up to Olsen's expectations as a converted attacking midfielder, McCarty was traded after 13 matches to rival club, New York Red Bulls in the middle of the season.

=== New York Red Bulls ===
In a shock move on June 27, 2011, McCarty was traded to the New York Red Bulls in return for Dwayne De Rosario. He became an instant starter for New York in central midfield upon his arrival at the club and was nicknamed the "Ginger Ninja" by teammates and supporters because of his light red hair. During the 2012 season McCarty had a breakout season for New York playing as a holding midfielder and was regarded as one of the top players on the team. He made 33 league appearances for the club and scored three goals and set up three others. He was regarded as the most underrated player in the league due to his silent presence in the midfield behind stars Thierry Henry and Tim Cahill.

Before the 2013 season; sporting director Andy Roxburgh extended McCarty's contract and praised him as the "heart and soul of the team." McCarty continued his fine play for New York throughout the season as he made 30 league appearances and scored four goals in helping the club to its first major title the 2013 MLS Supporters' Shield. On August 26, 2014, McCarty made his CONCACAF Champions League debut in a 2–0 win against El Salvadorian side, C.D. FAS. Throughout the 2014 season, McCarty anchored the midfield during their run to the 2014 Eastern Conference Finals where they ultimately fell to the New England Revolution. At the end of the season, McCarty was nominated for Goal of the Year, for his chip from outside the box against Bobby Shuttleworth and the Revolution on August 2. In December 2014, the Red Bulls turned down a large trade offer (multiple draft picks and allocation money) for McCarty from expansion club, Orlando City.

McCarty was named captain of New York on March 8, 2015, by the club's new coach, Jesse Marsch. During his first season as captain, McCarty appeared in a career-high 39 matches in all competitions and recorded another career-high with eight assists. His partnerships with Sacha Kljestan and Felipe helped form one of the strongest midfield trios in the league and helped lead New York to the 2015 MLS Supporters' Shield. McCarty and the front office met with season ticket holders at a town hall meeting on September 2 in a way to build an even stronger relationship with the fanbase and address concerns. On November 1, 2015, McCarty scored the lone goal for New York in a 1–0 victory over former club and rival D.C. United in the first leg of the MLS Cup Playoff Seminfinals. The match also wrote McCarty's name in the record books as he tied the club record for most playoff starts with 12. He would go on to break that record the following week with a start against his former club, D.C. United. Strong performances throughout the 2015 season, landed McCarty his first all-star appearance as well as his first appearance on Major League Soccer's Best XI of the season.

During the 2016 preseason, McCarty signed a new multi-year deal with the club on January 8. The terms of the deal were not disclosed as per MLS' league policy. McCarty was named alongside Darlington Nagbe as ESPN's most underrated player in MLS, even after earning MLS All-Star recognition during the previous season. On May 21, McCarty scored two goals in the Red Bulls 7–0 victory against New York City FC in the Hudson River Derby. It was the first two-goal game in his career. The following week against Toronto FC, McCarty became the second player in club history to make 150 league starts. McCarty fractured his tibia on July 31 against the Chicago Fire. After being forced out of play for a month, McCarty returned to the field on September 3 against Vancouver. After being eliminated from the playoffs by the Montreal Impact; McCarty appeared in his 198th game for the club and became the club's all-time appearance leader.

=== Chicago Fire ===
On January 16, 2017, McCarty was traded to the Chicago Fire in exchange for $400,000 in allocation money. The trade took McCarty completely by surprise, with the move being announced just days after the 29-year-old was married and while he was attending his first U.S. national team camp in years. Since joining Chicago Fire in 2017, the club has had their most successful season in years and he has enjoyed acclaim as the "unsung hero" of the club with which he passed 250 starts in MLS.

=== Nashville SC ===
On November 12, 2019, it was officially announced that McCarty had been traded to new MLS side Nashville SC ahead of their inaugural season in 2020. Chicago received $50,000 in 2020 General Allocation Money, $50,000 in 2020 Targeted Allocation Money and a second round pick in the 2021 MLS SuperDraft.

=== Atlanta United FC ===
On January 9, 2024, McCarty signed for fellow club Atlanta United as a free agent.

On August 19, 2024, McCarty announced that he would be retiring from professional football after the 2024 season.

=== Des Moines Menace ===
In 2025, McCarty joined several other retired MLS players including fellow Apple TV MLS analysts Sacha Kljestan, Bradley Wright-Phillips, and Ozzie Alonso on the roster of USL League Two side Des Moines Menace for their matches in the 2025 U.S. Open Cup. McCarty played the full 90 minutes in both the 2–1 win over Sporting Kansas City II and the 2–1 loss to Union Omaha on March 19 and April 2 respectively.

== International career ==
McCarty was named to the United States U-20 men's national soccer team for the 2007 FIFA U-20 World Cup.

He was named to the roster of the United States U-23 men's national soccer team for the 2008 CONCACAF Men Pre-Olympic Tournament in March 2008. He played in every match for the U-23 squad and was named to the All Tournament Team with teammates Maurice Edu and Freddy Adu. He was also voted to the "2008 Best XI" as a midfielder by the CONCACAF Technical Study Group.

McCarty received his first senior international cap with the United States national team as a late substitute for Michael Bradley during the international friendly between Slovakia and the United States on November 14, 2009. He earned his second cap four days later in a match against Denmark. In 2010, McCarty played the last 13 minutes in a friendly against Honduras.

2011 looked to be the beginning of a more consistent McCarty role with the national team as he was called up by Coach Bob Bradley to participate in the January training camp and then led the team as captain in their match against Chile, which resulted in a draw.

After a long absence from the national team, McCarty was called into the January 2017 training camp by Bruce Arena.

== Personal life ==
McCarty's middle name, and now nickname came from the main character in his father's favorite book; The Adventurers. He was listed as one of the top American soccer players to follow on Twitter (now X) because of his funny remarks, critiques of referees, and banter with rival fans. His French Bulldogs, Koji and Bali, also have their own Instagram page. In June 2016, McCarty appeared in a cartoon advertisement for Affinity Federal Credit Union, along with teammates, Luis Robles, Connor Lade and Felipe.

== Career statistics ==
=== Club ===
Appearances and goals by club, season and competition
Club	Season	League			U.S. Open Cup		Playoffs		Continental		Other		Total	
Club	Season	Division	Apps	Goals	Apps	Goals	Apps	Goals	Apps	Goals	Apps	Goals	Apps	Goals
FC Dallas	2006	MLS	2	0	—		0	0	—		—		2	0
FC Dallas	2007	MLS	25	1	1	0	1	0	1 (Note: Appearance in North American SuperLiga)	0	—		28	1
FC Dallas	2008	MLS	17	0	0	0	0	0	—		—		17	0
FC Dallas	2009	MLS	28	3	0	0	0	0	—		—		28	3
FC Dallas	2010	MLS	21	1	1	1	4	1	—		—		26	3
FC Dallas	Total		93	5	2	1	5	1	1	0	0	0	101	7
D.C. United	2011	MLS	13	0	0	0	0	0	—		—		13	0
New York Red Bulls	2011	MLS	16	0	—		2	0	—		—		18	0
New York Red Bulls	2012	MLS	33	3	2	0	2	0	—		—		37	3
New York Red Bulls	2013	MLS	30	4	2	0	2	0	—		—		34	4
New York Red Bulls	2014	MLS	31	3	—		5	0	3 (Note: Appearances in CONCACAF Champions League)	0	—		38	3
New York Red Bulls	2015	MLS	32	1	3	0	4	1	—		—		39	2
New York Red Bulls	2016	MLS	27	3	2	0	2	0	—		—		31	3
New York Red Bulls	Total		169	14	9	0	17	1	3	0	0	0	198	15
Chicago Fire	2017	MLS	28	0	1	0	1	0	—		—		30	0
Chicago Fire	2018	MLS	26	0	4	0	0	0	—		—		30	0
Chicago Fire	2019	MLS	32	1	1	0	0	0	—		—		33	1
Chicago Fire	Total		86	1	6	0	1	0	0	0	0	0	93	1
Nashville SC	2020	MLS	21	1	—		3	1	—		—		24	2
Nashville SC	2021	MLS	28	0	—		2	0	—		—		30	0
Nashville SC	2022	MLS	29	0	3	0	1	0	—		—		33	0
Nashville SC	2023	MLS	27	1	0	0	1	0	—		6 (Note: Appearances in Leagues Cup)	0	34	1
Nashville SC	Total		105	2	3	0	7	1	0	0	6	0	121	3
Atlanta United FC	2024	MLS	22	0	3	0	5	0	—		2	0	32	0
Des Moines Menace	2025	USL2	—		2	0	—		—		—		2	0
Career total			488	22	25	1	35	3	4	0	8	0	560	26

=== International ===
Appearances and goals by national team and year
National team	Year	Apps	Goals
United States	2009	2	0
United States	2010	2	0
United States	2011	1	0
United States	2017	8	0
Total		13	0

== Honors ==
FC Dallas

- MLS Western Conference: 2010

New York Red Bulls

- Supporters' Shield: 2013, 2015

United States

- CONCACAF Gold Cup: 2017

Individual

- MLS All-Star: 2015, 2017
- MLS Best XI: 2015
- MLS 400 games club

Preceded by Thierry Henry	New York Red Bulls captain 2015–2016	Succeeded by Sacha Kljestan
