= Mo Adams =

Saudi footballer

Personal information
- Full name: Mohammed Adams
- Date of birth: 23 September 1996 (age 30)
- Place of birth: Nottingham, England
- Height: 1.75 m (5 ft 9 in)
- Position: Midfielder

Youth career
- 2008–2013: Nottingham Forest
- 2013–2015: Derby County

College career
| Years | Team | Apps | (Gls) |
| 2016–2017 | Syracuse Orange | 35 | (1) |

Senior career*
| Years | Team | Apps | (Gls) |
| 2015–2016 | Boston United | 1 | (0) |
| 2017 | Reading United | 5 | (0) |
| 2018–2019 | Chicago Fire | 25 | (0) |
| 2018 | → Tulsa Roughnecks (loan) | 1 | (0) |
| 2019–2021 | Atlanta United | 27 | (1) |
| 2019 | Atlanta United 2 | 4 | (0) |
| 2021–2022 | Inter Miami | 8 | (0) |
| 2022–2023 | Al Shabab | 0 | (0) |
| 2023–2024 | Al-Khaleej | 6 | (0) |
| 2024–2025 | Al-Batin | 6 | (0) |
- * Club domestic league appearances and goals as of 12:39, 21 August 2024 (UTC)

Mohammed "Mo" Adams (born 23 September 1996) is a British professional footballer who plays as a midfielder.

A youth product of Nottingham Forest and Derby County, in 2016, Adams moved to the United States and played two seasons of college soccer for the Syracuse Orange. In 2018, Adams was chosen as the 10th overall selection by the Chicago Fire in the MLS SuperDraft.

== Career ==
=== Youth ===
Adams started his career in the youth ranks at Nottingham Forest before moving to Derby County. He scored 15 goals for Derby County Under-18s before his release in July 2015.

=== Syracuse Orange ===
In 2016, Adams committed to Syracuse University. In his freshman year with Syracuse Orange, Adams scored once in 19 games. At the end of the season, he was named in the All-Atlantic Coast Conference Second Team and the Cuse Award winner for Male Rookie of the Year. He was a member of the ACC All-Academic Team and the Athletic Director's Honor Roll. In his sophomore year, Adams was named team captain and made 16 appearances.

=== Chicago Fire ===
On 5 January 2018, Adams signed a Generation Adidas contract with Major League Soccer, making him eligible for the 2018 MLS SuperDraft.

On 19 January 2018, Adams was selected with the 10th overall pick of the 2018 MLS SuperDraft by the Chicago Fire. He made his professional debut on 21 April 2018, starting against New York Red Bulls in a 2–1 win.

=== Atlanta United ===
On 17 July 2019, Adams was traded to Atlanta United in exchange for $100,000 of General Allocation Money. On 26 July, Adams scored his first professional goal against Los Angeles FC, scoring the first in a 4–3 defeat.

=== Inter Miami ===
On 17 December 2021, it was announced that Adams would sign with Inter Miami ahead of their 2022 season. On 10 June 2022, he agreed to mutually terminate his contract.

=== Saudi Arabia ===
On 10 June 2022, Adams joined Saudi Professional League side Al Shabab on a four-year deal.

On 23 November 2023, Adams joined Saudi Professional League side Al-Khaleej FC.

On 12 September 2024, Adams joined Saudi First Division League side Al-Batin FC.

== Personal life ==
Adams was born in Eritrea and moved to Nottingham, England when he was 8 years old. His football inspirations include Dom Dwyer and Bastian Schweinsteiger.

== Career statistics ==
=== Club ===
As of match played 2 November 2020

Appearances and goals by club, season and competition
| Club | Season | League | | | National cup | | League cup | | Continental | | Total | |
| Club | Season | Division | Apps | Goals | Apps | Goals | Apps | Goals | Apps | Goals | Apps | Goals |
|---|---|---|---|---|---|---|---|---|---|---|---|---|
| Boston United | 2015–16 | National League North | 1 | 0 | — | | — | | — | | 1 | 0 |
| Reading United | 2017 | USL PDL | 5 | 0 | 1 | 0 | — | | — | | 6 | 0 |
| Chicago Fire | 2018 | Major League Soccer | 15 | 0 | — | | — | | — | | 15 | 0 |
| Chicago Fire | 2019 | Major League Soccer | 10 | 0 | — | | — | | — | | 10 | 0 |
| Chicago Fire | Total | | 25 | 0 | — | | — | | — | | 25 | 0 |
| Tulsa Roughnecks (loan) | 2018 | USL Championship | 1 | 0 | — | | — | | — | | 1 | 0 |
| Atlanta United | 2019 | Major League Soccer | 4 | 1 | 0 | 0 | 2 (Note: Appearances in MLS Cup Playoffs) | 0 | 0 | 0 | 6 | 1 |
| Atlanta United | 2020 | Major League Soccer | 13 | 0 | — | | — | | 3 (Note: Appearances in CONCACAF Champions League) | 0 | 16 | 0 |
| Atlanta United | Total | | 17 | 1 | 0 | 0 | 2 | 0 | 3 | 0 | 22 | 1 |
| Atlanta United 2 | 2019 | USL Championship | 4 | 0 | — | | — | | — | | 4 | 0 |
| Career total | | | 53 | 1 | 1 | 0 | 2 | 0 | 3 | 0 | 59 | 1 |
