= Grant Lillard =

American soccer player (born 1995)

Personal information
- Full name: Grant Lillard
- Date of birth: December 5, 1995 (age 30)
- Place of birth: Scottsdale, Arizona, United States
- Height: 1.90 m (6 ft 3 in)
- Position: Defender

Youth career
- 2012–2014: Chicago Fire

College career
Years	Team	Apps	(Gls)
2014–2017	Indiana Hoosiers	86	(14)

Senior career*
Years	Team	Apps	(Gls)
2018–2019	Chicago Fire	12	(0)
2019	→ Lansing Ignite (loan)	4	(0)
2020	Inter Miami	0	(0)
2020–2021	Columbus Crew	0	(0)
2022	Loudoun United	16	(1)
- * Club domestic league appearances and goals as of August 23, 2022

Grant Lillard (born December 5, 1995) is an American professional soccer player who plays as a defender.

== Early life ==
=== Youth ===
Lillard moved to Hinsdale, Illinois and enrolled at Hinsdale Central, playing soccer for the Chicago Fire Academy (U16 and U18). While living in Arizona, he played soccer for the Scottsdale Soccer Club 96 Blackhawks, winning Arizona State Championships in 2009, 2010, and 2011. One of his close childhood friends is Ryan Scales. Scales was one of the all-time leading scorers for the Hinsdale Central High School Men's Basketball program.

=== College ===
Lillard attended Indiana University, where he played college soccer as a center back for the Hoosiers from 2014 to 2017, tallying a total of 14 goals and 9 assists in 86 appearances. During his time at Indiana, Lillard was a three-time First-Team All-Big Ten, Big Ten Defensive Player of the Year, and a First-Team All-American.

== Professional career ==
=== Chicago Fire ===
On January 10, 2018, Lillard signed a one-year contract with Chicago Fire as a Homegrown Player, with options for the 2019 and 2020 seasons.

Lillard made his professional debut on April 7, 2018, as a 64th minute substitution in a 1–0 win over the Columbus Crew SC. He made his first professional start on April 14, 2018, in a 1–0 loss to the LA Galaxy.

=== Inter Miami ===
On November 14, 2019, Lillard was traded to Inter Miami in exchange for $75,000 in General Allocation Money.

=== Columbus Crew ===
On August 14, 2020, Lillard was traded to Columbus Crew in exchange for a third round 2021 MLS SuperDraft pick. Lillard failed to make a single appearance during the 2020 season for Columbus, however, he was part of the squad that won the 2020 MLS Cup. On December 14, 2020, Columbus announced that it had exercised Lillard's option for the 2021 season. Following the 2021 season, Columbus opted to decline their contract option on Lillard.

=== Loudoun United ===
On January 28, 2022, Lillard signed with USL Championship side Loudoun United, the lower-league affiliate of D.C. United.

== Career statistics ==
=== Club ===
As of June 28, 2021

Appearances and goals by club, season and competition
Club	Season	League			National Cup		Continental		Total	
Club	Season	Division	Apps	Goals	Apps	Goals	Apps	Goals	Apps	Goals
Chicago Fire	2018	MLS	8	0	1	0	0	0	9	0
Chicago Fire	2019	MLS	4	0	1	0	1 (Note: Appearance(s) in Leagues Cup)	0	6	0
Chicago Fire	Total		12	0	2	0	1	0	15	0
Lansing Ignite (loan)	2019	USL	4	0	—		—		4	0
Inter Miami	2020	MLS	0	0	—		—		0	0
Columbus Crew	2020	MLS	0	0	—		—		0	0
Columbus Crew	2021	MLS	0	0	—		1 (Note: Includes 1 appearance in the CONCACAF Champions League)	0	1	
Career total			16	0	2	0	2	0	20	0

== Honors ==
Columbus Crew

- MLS Cup: 2020
- Campeones Cup: 2021
