= Stefan Cleveland =

American soccer player (born 1994)

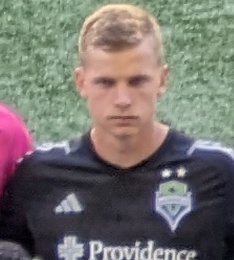
- Cleveland with the Seattle Sounders in 2023

Personal information
- Full name: Stefan Daniel Cleveland
- Date of birth: May 25, 1994 (age 32)
- Place of birth: Dayton, Ohio, United States
- Height: 6 ft 2 in (1.88 m)
- Position: Goalkeeper

Team information
- Current team: Sporting Kansas City
- Number: 30

Youth career
- Blast FC

College career
Years	Team	Apps	(Gls)
2012–2015	Dartmouth Big Green	38	(0)
2016	Louisville Cardinals	22	(0)

Senior career*
Years	Team	Apps	(Gls)
2015	Dayton Dutch Lions	3	(0)
2017–2019	Chicago Fire	5	(0)
2017	→ Tulsa Roughnecks (loan)	2	(0)
2018	→ Tulsa Roughnecks (loan)	1	(0)
2019	→ Lansing Ignite (loan)	21	(0)
2020–2023	Seattle Sounders	22	(0)
2020	→ Tacoma Defiance (loan)	2	(0)
2022–2023	→ Tacoma Defiance (loan)	1	(0)
2024–2025	Austin FC	0	(0)
2025	→ Austin FC II (loan)	1	(0)
2026–	Sporting Kansas City	0	(0)
- * Club domestic league appearances and goals as of 12:27, December 12, 2025 (UTC)

Stefan Daniel Cleveland (born May 25, 1994) is an American professional soccer player who plays as a goalkeeper for Major League Soccer club Sporting Kansas City.

== Early life ==
Cleveland was born in Dayton, Ohio, and attended The Miami Valley School.

== Career ==
=== College and amateur ===
Cleveland spent four years at Dartmouth College playing college soccer. After earning an engineering degree from Dartmouth College in 2016, Cleveland began graduate school at the University of Louisville in 2017. While at University of Louisville, Cleveland used his final season of NCAA eligibility playing for the Cardinals.

In 2015, Cleveland appeared for Premier Development League side Dayton Dutch Lions.

=== Professional ===
On January 13, 2017, Cleveland was drafted in the second round as the 26th overall pick in the 2017 MLS SuperDraft by Chicago Fire. He signed with the club on January 30, 2017.

He made his professional debut on May 27, 2017, whilst on loan with Chicago's United Soccer League affiliate Tulsa Roughnecks during a 3–1 win over Portland Timbers 2. He made his MLS debut on August 4, 2018, starting in a 2–1 loss to Real Salt Lake, making 8 saves and allowing 2 goals.

Cleveland was acquired by Seattle Sounders FC on November 26, 2019. He has mainly played for reserve team Tacoma Defiance or filled in for starting Sounders goalkeeper Stefan Frei during congested weeks of the season or with injuries. Cleveland played 16 matches during the 2021 season after Frei injured his knee early in the season. On January 19, 2022, Cleveland re-signed with the Sounders.

On December 24, 2023, Austin FC acquired Cleveland as a free agent and signed him to a two-year deal with a club option for the third year.

On December 10, 2025, Sporting Kansas City acquired Cleveland in exchange for $50,000 in general allocation money.

== Career statistics ==
=== Club ===
As of match played May 7, 2025

Appearances and goals by club, season and competition
Club	Season	League			National cup (Note: Appearances in U.S. Open Cup)		Other		Total	
Club	Season	Division	Apps	Goals	Apps	Goals	Apps	Goals	Apps	Goals
Dayton Dutch Lions	2015	PDL	3	0	—		—		3	0
Chicago Fire	2017	Major League Soccer	0	0	0	0	—		0	0
Chicago Fire	2018	Major League Soccer	5	0	0	0	—		5	0
Chicago Fire	2019	Major League Soccer	0	0	0	0	—		0	0
Chicago Fire	Total		5	0	0	0	0	0	5	0
Tulsa Roughnecks (loan)	2017	USL	2	0	0	0	—		2	0
Tulsa Roughnecks (loan)	2018	USL	1	0	0	0	—		1	0
Tulsa Roughnecks (loan)	Total		3	0	0	0	0	0	3	0
Lansing Ignite (loan)	2019	USL 1	21	0	0	0	1 (Note: Appearances in USL League One Playoffs)	0	22	0
Seattle Sounders FC	2020	Major League Soccer	0	0	—		—		0	0
Seattle Sounders FC	2021	Major League Soccer	15	0	—		1 (Note: Appearances in Leagues Cup)	0	15	0
Seattle Sounders FC	2022	Major League Soccer	7	0	1	0	—		8	0
Seattle Sounders FC	2023	Major League Soccer	2	0	2	0	1	0	5	0
Seattle Sounders FC	Total		24	0	3	0	2	0	28	0
Tacoma Defiance	2020	USL Championship	0	0	—		—		0	0
Tacoma Defiance	2021	USL Championship	2	0	—		—		2	0
Tacoma Defiance	2022	USL Championship	1	0	—		—		1	0
Tacoma Defiance	Total		3	0	0	0	0	0	3	0
Austin FC	2024	Major League Soccer	0	0	—		1	0	1	0
Austin FC	2025	Major League Soccer	0	0	1	0	—		1	0
Austin FC	Total		0	0	1	0	1	0	2	0
Austin FC II (loan)	2025	MLS Next Pro	1	0	—		—		1	0
Sporting Kansas City	2026	Major League Soccer	0	0	0	0	—		0	0
Career total			60	0	4	0	4	0	68	0

== Honors ==
Seattle Sounders FC

- CONCACAF Champions League: 2022
