= Aleksandar Katai =

Serbian footballer (born 1991)

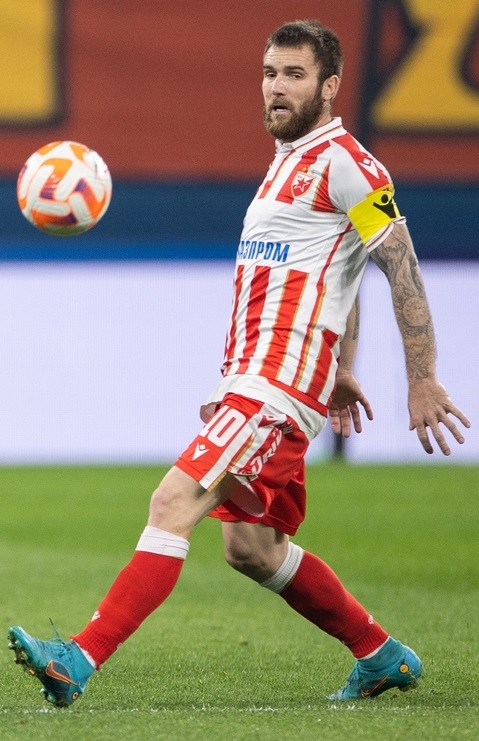
- Katai playing for Red Star Belgrade in 2022

Personal information
- Date of birth: 6 February 1991 (age 35)
- Place of birth: Srbobran, SR Serbia, Yugoslavia
- Height: 1.82 m (6 ft 0 in)
- Position: Winger

Team information
- Current team: Red Star Belgrade
- Number: 10

Youth career
- 2002–2009: Vojvodina

Senior career*
Years	Team	Apps	(Gls)
2009–2011	Vojvodina	29	(6)
2009	→ Palić (loan)	10	(3)
2011–2014	Olympiacos	0	(0)
2011	→ OFI (loan)	2	(0)
2012–2013	→ Vojvodina (loan)	31	(6)
2013–2014	→ Platanias (loan)	24	(8)
2014–2016	Red Star Belgrade	57	(25)
2016–2017	Alavés	23	(3)
2018–2020	Chicago Fire	62	(18)
2020	LA Galaxy	2	(0)
2020–	Red Star Belgrade	180	(104)

International career^{‡}
2011–2012	Serbia U21	2	(0)
2015–	Serbia	13	(1)
- * Club domestic league appearances and goals as of 26 October 2026 ‡ National team caps and goals as of 16 November 2025

Aleksandar Katai (Serbian Cyrillic: Александар Катаи; born 6 February 1991) is a Serbian professional footballer who plays as a winger for Red Star Belgrade and the Serbia national team.

== Club career ==
=== Vojvodina ===
Katai started playing football for his hometown club FK Vojvodina youth squad. After a six- month loan to lower league team FK Palić at the start of 2009–10 season, he was promoted to Vojvodina's first team. His debut in Serbian SuperLiga was on 14 March 2010, when he came in as substitute against FK Čukarički, and he scored his first goal just seven days later in a match against Mladi Radnik. On 28 June 2011, he left FK Vojvodina and went to Athens to join Olympiacos.

=== Olympiacos ===
On 24 June 2011, Olympiacos agreed to sign Katai on a four-year contract. At his first trainings with the club, coach Ernesto Valverde told Katai that he did not defend enough and that he needed to improve as a player. Katai did not play a single match for Olympiacos, but was instead sent on loan four times.

He was first loaned to OFI, with whom he made his debut on 5 November 2011, against Panionios. The loan spell to Crete was unsuccessful, and so Olympiacos loaned him back to his hometown club FK Vojvodina. While on loan at Vojvodina, in 2012 after one game with Spartak Subotica, he fell very ill and was admitted to the hospital, where he was diagnosed with thrombocytopenia. He had to have some blood removed, and stayed in the hospital for two weeks before he was allowed to finish his recovery from home. During his recovery, he gained over 20 pounds, and he did not return to play football until the end of the year. He remained a loaned player for Vojvodina until the club president Ratko Butorović died unexpectedly on 8 June 2013, which led to a period of instability in the club during which Katai left. He subsequently was loaned to Platanias, for whom he scored a total of eight goals and six assists, until his loan there expired in the summer of 2014.

"Katai's problem is not motivation, it's in his head, because maybe he did not want to return to Serbia. The boy trained for a month and a half until midnight [at Olympiacos], and they still didn't allow him to train properly. All they did was let him on the training field so he wouldn't sue them. He is a little angry..."

— Nenad Lalatović, 7 October 2014

=== Red Star Belgrade ===
==== 2014–15 season ====
On 31 August 2014, in a last-minute deal before the transfer window closed, Katai devoted to a one-year loan to Red Star Belgrade. Throughout autumn 2014, Katai was reported to be out of shape, and Red Star's coach Nenad Lalatović was said to have claimed that Katai "had a problem in his head".

==== 2015–16 season ====
On 18 June 2015, it was announced that Katai terminated his contract with Olympiacos and forgave a debt of €300,000 which was owed to him by Red Star from the loan contract, and subsequently signed a two-year contract with Red Star Belgrade. For the 2015–16 season, Miodrag "Grof" Božović was hired as the new coach, and Katai played a good game against Kairat in the first qualifying round for the Europa League, although Red Star failed to qualify. By the end of October 2015, Katai had scored 10 goals and made 6 assists in 15 league matches, ranking him one of the most effective midfielders in all of Europe at the time surveyed.

Katai ended the season with the title of the best scorer of the Superliga, scoring his 21st in the last round against Radnički for the 27th title celebration.

==== 2016–17 season ====
In the first competitive match of the 2016–17 season, Katai scored an equalizer and assist for win against Valletta FC in the first match of the second qualifying round for the Champions League in Valletta and winner in rematch, in Belgrade. In the first game of the third round of qualification for the Champions League against Bulgarian Ludogorets Razgrad, Katai continued his goal-scoring series with a 12th consecutive goal, when he dribbled past three players and scored. Red Star were ultimately eliminated.

=== Alavés ===
On 31 August 2016, Katai signed a three-year contract with La Liga side Deportivo Alavés, for an undisclosed fee.

=== Chicago Fire ===
On 6 February 2018, Katai was loaned by Alavés to Chicago Fire of Major League Soccer. The loan was for the 2018 MLS season and included a purchase option at season's end.

On 11 July 2018, the Chicago Fire acquired Katai on a permanent basis from Alavés for an unknown amount. The deal had Katai signed through the 2019 season, with a club option for 2020. It also had him remaining a TAM player for the 2018 season, but would change to a DP in 2019.

=== LA Galaxy ===
On 31 December 2019, after leaving the Chicago Fire, Katai joined the LA Galaxy through the use of Targeted Allocation Money. Katai was expected to be an important part of the Galaxy’s attack in 2020.

Katai was released by LA Galaxy on 5 June 2020, following controversial Instagram posts by Katai's wife, Tea, in the wake of the George Floyd protests and looting across the United States. Katai's wife, writing in Serbian, had compared protestors to "disgusting cattle", called for violent action against them in a caption under a photo of New York Police Department officers driving an SUV into a crowd of protesters ("shoot those shits"), and captioned an image of what appears to be a looter running off with boxes of Nike sneakers with "Black Nikes Matter".

The LA Galaxy requested the removal of his wife’s posts and issued a statement condemning "racism of any kind". Tea then took down the posts. In an Instagram post, Katai condemned his wife's posts as "unacceptable", rebuked her insensitivity, issued a personal apology, and indicated his support for the Black Lives Matter movement. Two days after the team became aware of the wife's posts, which also was two days after his post condemning her statements, and following a day of protests against Katai, the LA Galaxy released him.

=== Return to Red Star Belgrade ===
On 9 July 2020, Katai signed a two-year contract with Red Star Belgrade. On 31 May 2024, he extended his contract until 2026.

== International career ==
Katai played two games for Serbia U21 national team. He made his debut for Serbia in a 4–1 friendly loss to the Czech Republic on 13 November 2015. He earned a total of 10 caps (no goals) and his final international was a November 2020 European Championship qualification match against Scotland.

== Personal life ==
Born in Srbobran, a village in northern Serbia, his paternal grandfather was of Ukrainian origin and his grandmother was Hungarian. His surname is Hungarian, adopted from his grandmother.

== Career statistics ==
=== Club ===
As of match played 26 October 2026

Appearances and goals by club, season and competition
Club	Season	League			National cup (Note: Includes Serbian Cup, Greek Football Cup, Copa del Rey, U.S. Open Cup)		Continental		Total	
Club	Season	Division	Apps	Goals	Apps	Goals	Apps	Goals	Apps	Goals
Palić (loan)	2009–10	Serbian League Vojvodina	10	3	—		—		10	3
Palić (loan)	Total		10	3	—		—		10	3
Vojvodina	2009–10	Serbian SuperLiga	6	3	—		—		6	3
Vojvodina	2010–11	Serbian SuperLiga	23	3	4	1	—		27	4
Vojvodina	Total		29	6	4	1	—		33	7
OFI Crete (loan)	2011–12	Super League Greece	2	0	—		—		2	0
OFI Crete (loan)	Total		2	0	—		—		2	0
Vojvodina (loan)	2011–12	Serbian SuperLiga	11	1	2	0	—		13	1
Vojvodina (loan)	2012–13	Serbian SuperLiga	20	5	5	0	—		25	5
Vojvodina (loan)	Total		31	6	7	0	—		38	6
Platanias (loan)	2013–14	Super League Greece	24	8	2	0	—		26	8
Platanias (loan)	Total		24	8	2	0	—		26	8
Red Star Belgrade (loan)	2014–15	Serbian SuperLiga	20	2	2	0	—		22	2
Red Star Belgrade	2015–16	Serbian SuperLiga	33	21	1	2	2 (Note: Appearances in UEFA Europa League)	0	36	23
Red Star Belgrade	2016–17	Serbian SuperLiga	4	2	—		6 (Note: Four appearances and three goals in UEFA Champions League, two appearances and one goal in UEFA Europa League)	4	10	6
Red Star Belgrade	Total		57	25	3	2	8	4	68	31
Alavés	2016–17	La Liga	20	3	6	0	—		26	3
Alavés	2017–18	La Liga	3	0	1	0	—		4	0
Alavés	Total		23	3	7	0	—		30	3
Chicago Fire	2018	MLS	33	12	4	1	—		37	13
Chicago Fire	2019	MLS	29	6	0	0	—		29	6
Chicago Fire	Total		62	18	4	1	—		66	19
LA Galaxy	2020	MLS	2	0	0	0	—		2	0
LA Galaxy	Total		2	0	0	0	—		2	0
Red Star Belgrade	2020–21	Serbian SuperLiga	23	14	3	1	8 (Note: Three appearances in UEFA Champions League, five appearances and three goals in UEFA Europa League)	3	34	18
Red Star Belgrade	2021–22	Serbian SuperLiga	31	24	4	3	12 (Note: Four appearances and two goals in UEFA Champions League, eight appearances and four goals in UEFA Europa League)	6	47	33
Red Star Belgrade	2022–23	Serbian SuperLiga	35	17	5	0	10 (Note: Four appearances in UEFA Champions League, six appearances and two goals in UEFA Europa League)	2	50	19
Red Star Belgrade	2023–24	Serbian SuperLiga	23	9	5	2	5 (Note: Appearances in UEFA Champions League)	1	33	12
Red Star Belgrade	2024–25	Serbian SuperLiga	27	13	5	6	2	0	34	19
Red Star Belgrade	2025–26	Serbian SuperLiga	31	24	4	0	14 (Note: Six appearances and one goal in UEFA Champions League, eight appearances in UEFA Europa League)	1	49	25
Red Star Belgrade	2026–27	Serbian SuperLiga	10	3	1	1	5	2	16	6
Red Star Belgrade	Total		180	104	27	13	56	15	263	132
Career total			420	173	54	17	64	19	528	206

=== International ===
As of 16 November 2025

Appearances and goals by national team and year
National team	Year	Apps	Goals
Serbia	2015	1	0
Serbia	2016	5	0
Serbia	2017	0	0
Serbia	2018	0	0
Serbia	2019	3	0
Serbia	2020	1	0
Serbia	2021	0	0
Serbia	2022	0	0
Serbia	2023	0	0
Serbia	2024	0	0
Serbia	2025	3	1
Total		13	1

Scores and results list Serbia's goal tally first, score column indicates score after each Katai goal.

List of international goals scored by Aleksandar Katai
No.	Date	Venue	Opponent	Score	Result	Competition
1	16 November 2025	Dubočica Stadium, Leskovac, Serbia	Latvia	1–1	2–1	2026 FIFA World Cup qualification

== Honours ==
Red Star

- Serbian SuperLiga: 2015–16, 2020–21, 2021–22, 2022–23, 2023–24, 2024–25, 2025–26
- Serbian Cup: 2020–21, 2021–22, 2022–23, 2023–24, 2024–25, 2025–26

Individual

- Serbian SuperLiga top goalscorer: 2015–16, 2025–26
- Serbian SuperLiga Team of the Season: 2015–16, 2022–23
