= Jeremiah Gutjahr =

American soccer player

Personal information
- Date of birth: August 10, 1997 (age 29)
- Place of birth: Bloomington, Indiana, United States
- Height: 1.78 m (5 ft 10 in)
- Position: Defensive midfielder

Youth career
- 2012–2015: Chicago Fire

College career
Years	Team	Apps	(Gls)
2015–2018	Indiana Hoosiers	71	(2)

Senior career*
Years	Team	Apps	(Gls)
2016	Chicago Fire U-23	12	(2)
2019–2020	Chicago Fire	8	(0)
2021	Indy Eleven	27	(0)

International career
2017	United States U20	3	(0)
- * Club domestic league appearances and goals

Jeremiah Gutjahr (born August 10, 1997) is an American former professional soccer player who played as a midfielder.

== Early life ==
=== College & Youth ===
Gutjahr attended Indiana University, where he played college soccer as a defensive midfielder for the Hoosiers from 2016 to 2018, tallying a total of 2 goals and 3 assists in 71 appearances.

While at college, Gutjahr also appeared for USL PDL side Chicago Fire U-23 during their 2016 season.

== Professional career ==
=== Chicago Fire ===
On January 22, 2019, Gutjahr signed a one-year contract with Chicago Fire as a Homegrown Player, with options for the 2019, 2020 and 2021 seasons. He was released by Chicago at the end of the 2020 season.

=== Indy Eleven ===
On March 15, 2021, Gutjahr signed with USL Championship side Indy Eleven. He made his debut for the club on May 1, 2021, against Birmingham Legion.

=== Retirement ===
He is now retired and working at Indiana University as their Assistant Athletic Director for Revenue Share.

== Honors ==
United States U20

- CONCACAF Under-20 Championship (1): 2017
