= Aleksandar Sarić =

Serbian footballer (born 1974)

Aleksandar Sarić Александар Сарић
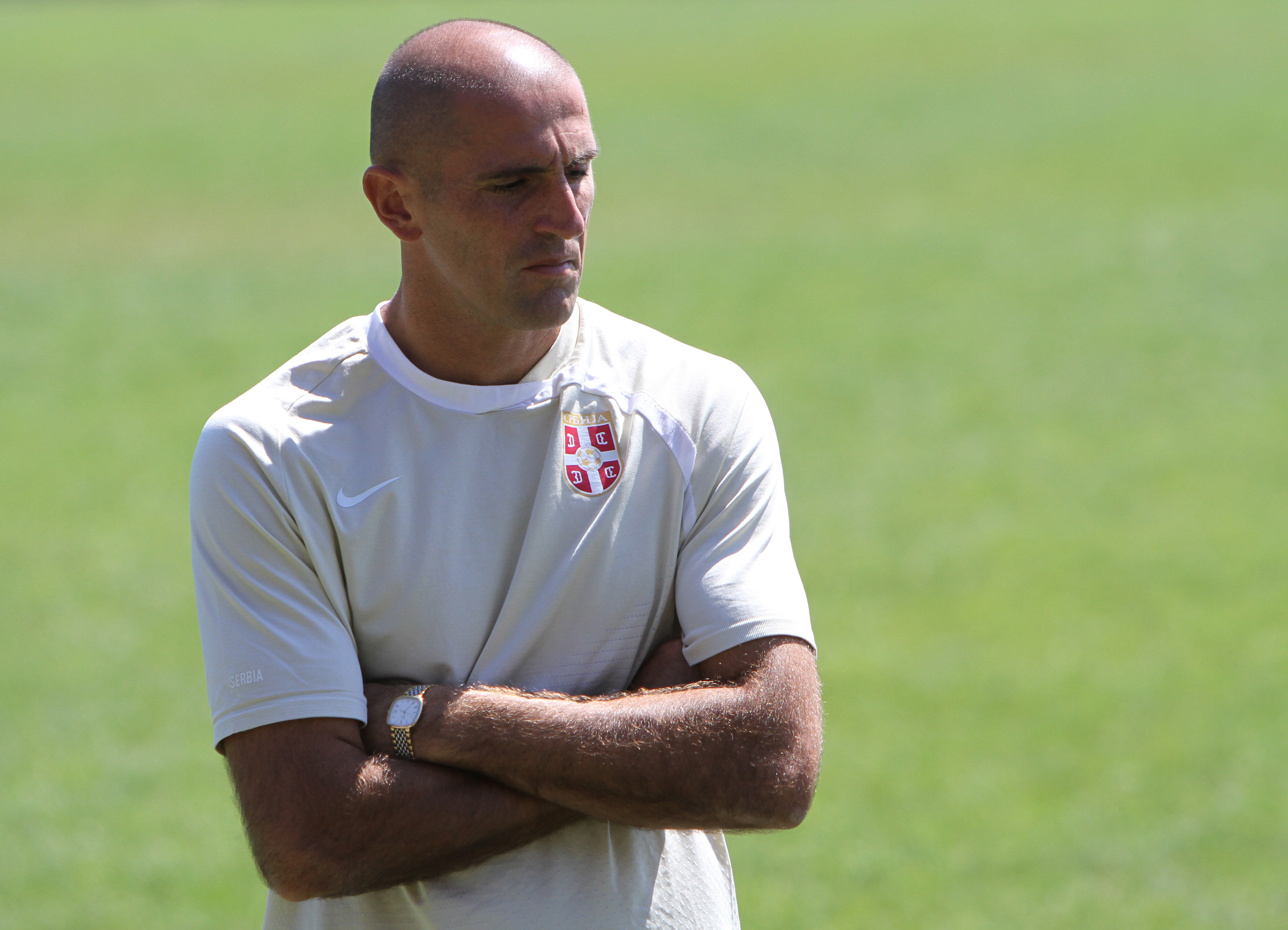
- Sarić in 2010

Personal information
- Date of birth: 27 January 1974 (age 52)
- Place of birth: Belgrade, SFR Yugoslavia
- Height: 1.92 m (6 ft 4 in)
- Position: Goalkeeper

Team information
- Current team: Elmhurst University

Youth career
- 1986–1991: Red Star Belgrade
- 1991–1993: Spartak Subotica

Senior career*
Years	Team	Apps	(Gls)
1993–1995	Beograd		
1995–1996	Obilić	12	(0)
1996–1997	Carl Zeiss Jena	14	(0)
1997–1999	União Madeira	62	(0)
1999–2000	Hapoel Jerusalem	38	(0)
2000–2001	Maccabi Petah Tikva	11	(0)
2001–2002	Železnik	2	(0)
2003	Politehnica Timișoara	7	(0)
2003–2004	Austria Lustenau	31	(0)
2005–2006	Varzim	6	(0)
2006–2007	SC-ESV Parndorf	12	(0)
2007–2008	Austria Kärnten	0	(0)
2008–2009	Dunajská Streda	0	(0)
2009–2011	Čukarički		

International career
- Yugoslavia U17
- FR Yugoslavia U21

Managerial career
- 2023–: Panathinaikos Chicago
- * Club domestic league appearances and goals

Aleksandar Sarić (Serbian Cyrillic: Александар Сарић; born 27 January 1974) is a Serbian football coach and former player. A former goalkeeper, he was goalkeeper coach of the Serbian U20 team which became world champion on New Zealand 2015.

== Club career ==
In an 18-year professional career, Sarić played for clubs in Serbia, Germany, Portugal, Israel, Romania, Austria and Slovakia. He played top division football with FK Beograd, FK Obilić, Hapoel Jerusalem F.C. – where he was voted the best goalkeeper in the Israeli Premier League – Maccabi Petah Tikva F.C., FK Železnik, FC Politehnica Timișoara, SK Austria Kärnten, FK DAC 1904 Dunajská Streda and FK Čukarički.

After he finished his career as an active player in 2010 Serbian SuperLiga, at the age of 37, he worked as a coach for FK Beograd and the national Serbian youth teams (U-15, U-17, and U-19). He is the owner and founder of the "B1" goalkeeper school in Belgrade.

== Coaching career ==
As a goalkeeper coach Saric has worked in the senior teams of SC Varzim, FC Austria Lustenau, FC Dunajska Streda, FC Beograd, FC Arema Malang, Chicago Fire SC and in Serbian National youth teams U15, U16, U17, U18, U19 and U20

In 2015 with Serbian U20 national team Saric become a World champion at New Zealand as a GK coach and assistant in the staff. Since 2015 he has worked as an assistant and GK coach in MLS league for Chicago Fire.

Half finalist of U20 European championship in Hungary as a goalkeeper coach and member of the staff of Serbian squad In Hungary as a member of the staff and GK coach on European championship

== Education ==
- Master manager of training technology Alfa University Belgrade
- Bachelor of sport science, Trainer in Football, University of Sport Belgrade
- UEFA A licence
- Spanish football federation Goalkeeper coach licence
- Austrian Goalkeeper coach licence
