= Nicolás Del Grecco =

Argentine footballer (born 1993)

Personal information
- Full name: Nicolás Del Grecco
- Date of birth: 19 November 1993 (age 32)
- Place of birth: Morteros, Argentina
- Height: 1.86 m (6 ft 1 in)
- Position: Defender

Team information
- Current team: Villa Mitre

Youth career
- Boca Juniors
- Tigre
- Atlético de Rafaela

Senior career*
Years	Team	Apps	(Gls)
2015–2016	Atlético de Rafaela	0	(0)
2016–2017	Libertad de Sunchales	36	(1)
2018	Olimpia	8	(0)
2018	Chicago Fire	0	(0)
2018	→ Tulsa Roughnecks	1	(0)
2020–	Villa Mitre	11	(0)
- * Club domestic league appearances and goals as of 20:07, 1 March 2021 (UTC)

Nicolás Del Grecco (born 19 November 1993) is an Argentine footballer who plays as a defender for Villa Mitre.
