= 2017 Chicago Fire season =

Chicago Fire
2017 season
- Chairman: Andrew Hauptman
- Head coach: Veljko Paunović
- Stadium: Toyota Park (capacity: 20,000)
- MLS: Conference: 3rd Overall: 3rd
- MLS Cup Playoffs: Conference Quarterfinals
- U.S. Open Cup: Round of 16
- Brimstone Cup: Winners
- Top goalscorer: League: Nemanja Nikolić (24); All: Nemanja Nikolić (24)
- Highest home attendance: 21,891 (August 19 vs Toronto FC)
- Lowest home attendance: 11,244 (May 17 vs Colorado Rapids)
- Average home league attendance: 17,383 (regular season); 11,647(playoffs)
- Biggest win: CHI 4-0 ORL (6/24); CHI (4-0) VAN (7/1)
- Biggest defeat: ATL 4-0 CHI (3/18)
Home colors	Away colors

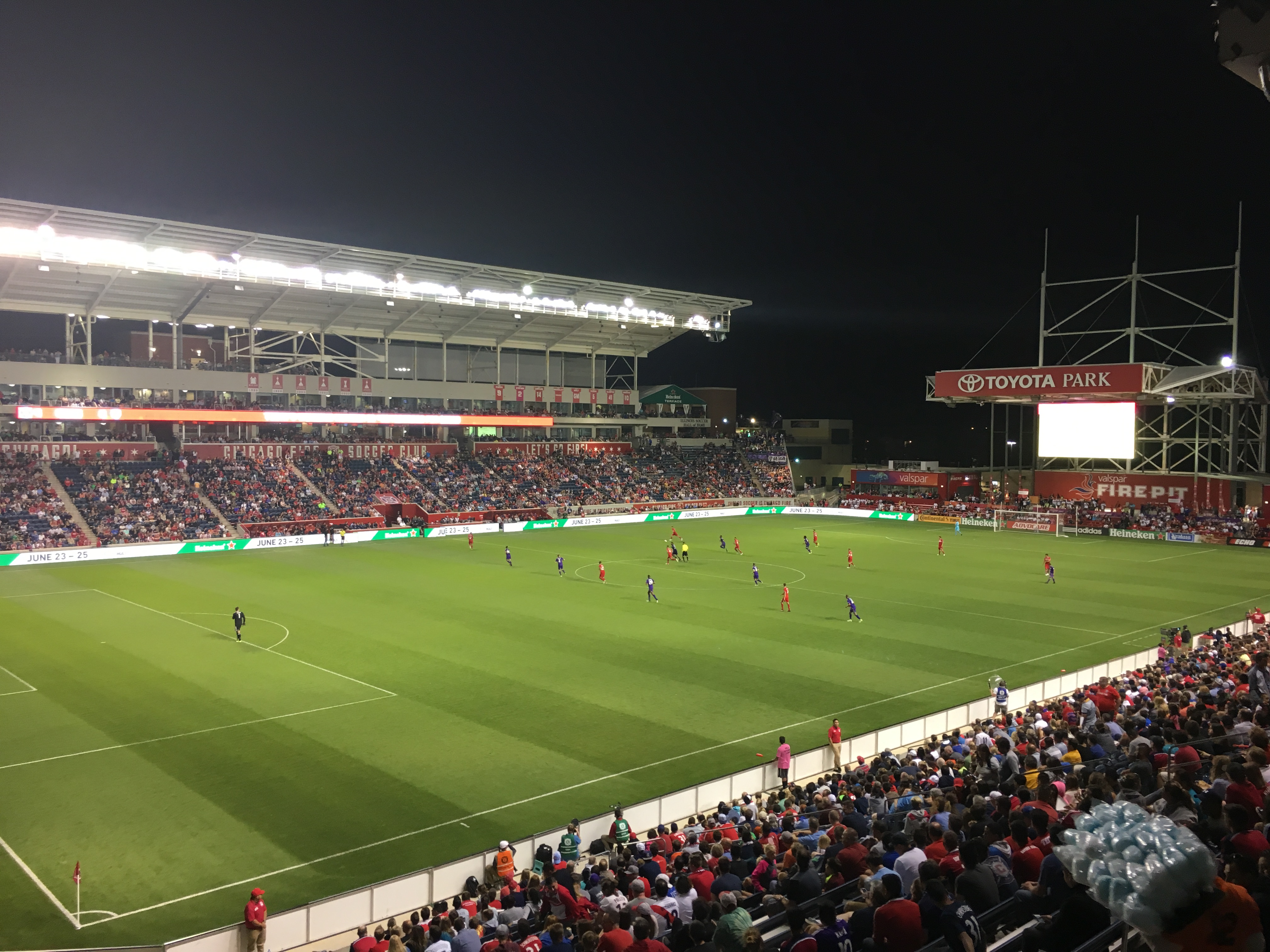
June 24 game against Orlando City SC

The 2017 Chicago Fire season was the club's 19th year of existence, as well as their 20th season in Major League Soccer, the top-flight of American soccer. The Fire reached the playoffs for the first time since 2012, losing in the knockout round. The team would not make the playoffs again until 2025.

== Current squad ==
As of September 27, 2017. Source: Chicago Fire official roster

No.	Name	Nationality	Position	Date of birth (age)	Previous club	Player Notes
Goalkeepers
1	Jorge Bava	(Uruguay)	GK	August 2, 1981 (age 44)	(Colombia) Atlético Bucaramanga	International
28	Matt Lampson	(United States)	GK	September 6, 1989 (age 36)	(United States) Columbus Crew	
30	Stefan Cleveland	(United States)	GK	May 25, 1994 (age 31)	(United States) University of Louisville	Loaned Out
45	Richard Sánchez	(Mexico)	GK	May 5, 1994 (age 31)	(Mexico) Tigres UANL	
Defenders
3	Brandon Vincent	(United States)	D	May 1, 1994 (age 31)	(United States) Stanford Cardinal	
4	Johan Kappelhof	(Netherlands)	D	August 5, 1990 (age 35)	(Netherlands) FC Groningen	International
5	Michael Harrington	(United States)	D	January 24, 1986 (age 40)	(United States) Colorado Rapids	
16	Jonathan Campbell	(United States)	D	June 27, 1993 (age 32)	(United States) North Carolina Tar Heels	
22	Patrick Doody	(United States)	D	April 22, 1992 (age 33)	(United States) Indiana Hoosiers	Homegrown
25	Jorge Luis Corrales	(Cuba)	D	May 20, 1991 (age 34)	(United States) Tulsa Roughnecks	Loaned Out
26	Christian Dean	(United States)	D	March 14, 1993 (age 32)	(Canada) Vancouver Whitecaps FC	
33	Matej Dekovic	(Croatia)	D	September 19, 1993 (age 32)	(United States) University of North Carolina Charlotte	International, Loaned out
66	João Meira	(Portugal)	D/M	April 30, 1987 (age 38)	(Portugal) Belenenses	International
Midfielders
2	Matt Polster	(United States)	M	June 8, 1993 (age 32)	(United States) SIU Edwardsville Cougars	
6	Dax McCarty	(United States)	M	April 30, 1987 (age 38)	(United States) New York Red Bulls	
7	John Goossens	(Netherlands)	M	July 25, 1988 (age 37)	(Romania) FC Voluntari	International, On injured list
12	Arturo Álvarez	(El Salvador)	M	June 28, 1985 (age 40)	(Hungary) Videoton FC	
13	Brandt Bronico	(United States)	M	June 20, 1995 (age 30)	(United States) University of North Carolina Charlotte	Loaned out
14	Djordje Mihailovic	(United States)	M	November 10, 1998 (age 27)	(United States) Chicago Fire Academy	Homegrown
15	Joey Calistri	(United States)	M	November 20, 1993 (age 32)	(United States) Northwestern Wildcats	Homegrown, Loaned out
17	Collin Fernandez	(United States) / (Peru)	M	February 13, 1997 (age 29)	(United States) Chicago Fire Academy	Homegrown, Loaned out
18	Drew Conner	(United States)	M	February 18, 1994 (age 32)	(United States) Wisconsin Badgers	Homegrown
19	Juninho	(Brazil)	M	January 8, 1989 (age 37)	(Mexico) Club Tijuana	Loaned in
20	Daniel Johnson	(United States)	M	September 8, 1995 (age 30)	(United States) University of Louisville	
31	Bastian Schweinsteiger	(Germany)	M	August 1, 1984 (age 41)	(England) Manchester United	Designated Player, International
Forwards
8	Michael de Leeuw	(Netherlands)	F	October 7, 1986 (age 39)	(Netherlands) FC Groningen	International
9	Luis Solignac	(Argentina)	F	February 16, 1991 (aged 25)	(United States) Colorado Rapids	International
10	David Arshakyan	(Armenia)	F	August 16, 1994 (age 31)	(Lithuania) FK Trakai	International
11	David Accam	(Ghana)	F/M	September 28, 1990 (age 35)	(Sweden) Helsingborgs IF	Designated Player
23	Nemanja Nikolić	(Hungary)	F	December 31, 1987 (age 38)	(Poland) Legia Warsaw	Designated Player, International

== Player movement ==
=== In ===
Per Major League Soccer and club policies terms of the deals do not get disclosed.

Date	Player	Position	Previous club	Notes	Ref
November 23, 2016	(El Salvador) Arturo Álvarez	M	(United States) Chicago Fire	Exercised option	
November 23, 2016	(United States) Joey Calistri	M	(United States) Chicago Fire	Exercised option	
November 23, 2016	(United States) Jonathan Campbell	D	(United States) Chicago Fire	Exercised option	
November 23, 2016	(United States) Drew Conner	M	(United States) Chicago Fire	Exercised option	
November 23, 2016	(United States) Patrick Doody	D	(United States) Chicago Fire	Exercised option	
November 23, 2016	(United States) Sean Johnson	GK	(United States) Chicago Fire	Exercised option	
November 23, 2016	(United States) Matt Lampson	GK	(United States) Chicago Fire	Exercised option	
November 23, 2016	(United States) Matt Polster	M	(United States) Chicago Fire	Exercised option	
November 23, 2016	(United States) Brandon Vincent	D	(United States) Chicago Fire	Exercised option	
December 20, 2016	(Hungary) Nemanja Nikolić	F	(Poland) Legia Warsaw	Acquired via transfer as a Designated Player, signed a three-year deal	
January 5, 2017	(Argentina) Luis Solignac	F	(United States) Chicago Fire	Re-signed with the club after initially having his option declined on November 23, 2016; signed to a two-year contract with an option for a third	
January 7, 2017	(Uruguay) Jorge Bava	GK	(Colombia) Atlético Bucaramanga	Signed as a Discovery Player to a one-year deal with options for 2018 and 2019	
January 16, 2017	(United States) Dax McCarty	M	(United States) New York Red Bulls	Acquired in exchange for $400,000 in General Allocation Money ($200,000 in 2017 allocation funds and $200,000 for 2018); signed one-year contract with two one-year options	
January 27, 2017	(United States) Djordje Mihailovic	M	(United States) Chicago Fire Academy	Signed as a Homegrown Player	
January 30, 2017	(United States) Daniel Johnson	M	(United States) University of Louisville	Signed to a one-year deal with three-year club options after being drafted 11th overall in the 2017 MLS SuperDraft	
January 30, 2017	(United States) Stefan Cleveland	GK	(United States) University of Louisville	Signed to a one-year deal with three-year club options after being drafted 26th overall in the 2017 MLS SuperDraft	
February 27, 2017	(United States) Brandt Bronico	M	(United States) University of North Carolina Charlotte	Signed to a one-year deal with three-year club options after being drafted 47th overall in the 2017 MLS SuperDraft	
February 27, 2017	(Croatia) Matej Dekovic	D	(United States) University of North Carolina Charlotte	Signed to a one-year deal with three-year club options after being drafted 69th overall in the 2017 MLS SuperDraft	
March 21, 2017	(Germany) Bastian Schweinsteiger	M	(England) Manchester United	Signed as a Designated Player to a one-year deal with a mutual option for at least one year	
August 9, 2017	(United States) Christian Dean	D	(Canada) Vancouver Whitecaps FC	Acquired in exchange for $50,000 of General Allocation Money, $50,000 of conditional Targeted Allocation Money in the event he starts 12 or more 2018 regular season matches, and a percentage of any future transfer fees; signed a one-year deal with two-year club options	
August 11, 2017	(Mexico) Richard Sánchez	G	(Mexico) Tigres UANL	Signed a one-year contract with options for 2018 and 2019 after being acquired 6th overall in the Allocation Order	
September 14, 2017	(Cuba) Jorge Luis Corrales	D	(United States) Tulsa Roughnecks	Signed a contract through 2018 with options for 2019 and 2020; he was then immediately loaned back to the Roughnecks	

=== Out ===
Date	Player	Position	Destination Club	Notes	Ref
November 23, 2016	(Romania) Răzvan Cociș	M	None	Contract option was not exercised, was eligible for the Re-Entry Draft but wasn't selected	
November 23, 2016	(United States) Eric Gehrig	D	None	Contract option was not exercised, was eligible for the Re-Entry Draft but wasn't selected; retired and was named Chicago Fire assistant coach on February 15, 2017	
November 23, 2016	(United States) Nick LaBrocca	M	None	Contract option was not exercised, eligible for free agency	
November 23, 2016	(United States) Patrick McLain	GK	(United States) Orlando City SC	Contract option was not exercised, selected by Orlando City SC in the Re-Entry Draft	
November 23, 2016	(United States) Alex Morrell	M	(United States) Tampa Bay Rowdies	Contract option was not exercised, signed with Tampa Bay Rowdies on December 29, 2016	
November 23, 2016	(Brazil) Rodrigo Ramos	D	(Brazil) Coritiba	Loan expired	
November 23, 2016	(United States) Michael Stephens	M	(United States) San Francisco Deltas	Contract option was not exercised, was eligible for the Re-Entry Draft but wasn't selected; signed with San Francisco Deltas on January 6	
November 23, 2016	(Senegal) Khaly Thiam	M	(Hungary) MTK Budapest	Loan expired	
December 11, 2016	(United States) Sean Johnson	GK	(United States) New York City FC	Traded to Atlanta United FC for General Allocation Money; Atlanta then traded him to New York City FC in exchange for General Allocation Money and Targeted Allocation Money	

- Players selected in 2017 MLS SuperDraft, but ultimately not signed: forward Guillermo Delgado (27th overall, second round, from University of Delaware).
- Trialists released in the preseason: midfielder Miguel Alvarado, defender Chad Barson, defender Drew Beckie, forward Juan Pablo Caffa, goalkeeper Chris Konopka, goalkeeper Mihajlo Miskovic (Chicago Fire Academy), defender Boyd Okwuonu defender Taylor Peay, and defender Ryan Taylor.
- Trialists who joined the team during the season but were not signed: forward Maximilian Beister, defender Justin Bilyeu, midfielder Alessandro Diamanti, and defender Michael Schulze,

=== Loans ===
Per Major League Soccer and club policies terms of the deals do not get disclosed.

==== In ====
Date	Player	Position	Loaned from	Notes	Ref
December 23, 2016	(Brazil) Juninho	M	(Mexico) Club Tijuana	Signed on loan to a one-year contract with options to purchase the player outright or extend the contract; Fire sent general allocation money, 2017 MLS SuperDraft natural selection second round pick and the No. 3 spot in the Allocation Ranking Order to Minnesota United FC in exchange for the No. 2 spot used to acquire the player (No. 1 spot holder passed)	

==== Out ====
Date	Player	Position	Loaned to	Notes	Return	Ref
March 15, 2017	(United States) Joey Calistri	M	(United States) Tulsa Roughnecks	Reporter Orrin Schwartz confirmed that Collin Fernandez, Joey Calistri and Matej Dekovic would be loaned to Tulsa Roughnecks with the ability to call back at any time.		
March 15, 2017	(Croatia) Matej Dekovic	D	(United States) Tulsa Roughnecks	Reporter Orrin Schwartz confirmed that Collin Fernandez, Joey Calistri and Matej Dekovic would be loaned to Tulsa Roughnecks with the ability to call back at any time.		
March 15, 2017	(United States) / (Peru) Collin Fernandez	M	(United States) Tulsa Roughnecks	Reporter Orrin Schwartz confirmed that Collin Fernandez, Joey Calistri and Matej Dekovic would be loaned to Tulsa Roughnecks with the ability to call back at any time.		
May 13, 2017	(United States) Brandt Bronico	M	(United States) Tulsa Roughnecks	The Tulsa Roughnecks tweeted out a starting lineup that included Bronico, confirming that he'd been loaned to the club. He returned in early June.		
May 23, 2017	(United States) Stefan Cleveland	GK	(United States) Tulsa Roughnecks	Nelson Rodriguez announced that Cleveland would be leaving for Tulsa following the May 25 game against FC Dallas. Following the injury of Jorge Bava, he was called back in.	June 2017	
July 14, 2017	(United States) Patrick Doody	D	(United States) St. Louis FC	St. Louis announced that they'd acquired Doody on loan.	July 2017	
September 14, 2017	(Cuba) Jorge Luis Corrales	D	(United States) Tulsa Roughnecks	Signed a contract through 2018 with options for 2019 and 2020; he was then immediately loaned back to the Roughnecks		

== Technical staff ==
Position	Staff
General Manager	(United States) Nelson Rodríguez
Head Coach	(Serbia) Veljko Paunović
Assistant Coach	(Serbia) Marko Mitrović
Assistant Coach	(United States) Eric Gehrig
Goalkeeper Coach	(Serbia) Aleksandar Sarić
Strength and Conditioning Coach	Raphael Fevre
Director of Scouting	Matt Pearson
Video Analyst	Nenad Babic
Manager of Team and Soccer Operations	Alex Boler
Equipment Manager	Brian Sauer
Assistant Equipment Manager	Juan Arreola
Head Athletic Trainer	Steven Purcell
Assistant Athletic Trainer	Reade Whitney
Chief Medical Officer	Dr. Joshua Blomgren, D.O.
Head Orthopedic Officer	Dr. Brian Forsythe, M.D.
Physical Therapist	Ryan Perry

Last updated: May 1, 2017
Source: Chicago Fire Technical Staff

== Standings ==
=== Eastern Conference table ===
Pos	Team	Pld	W	L	T	GF	GA	GD	Pts	Qualification
1	Toronto FC	34	20	5	9	74	37	+37	69	MLS Cup Conference Semifinals
2	New York City FC	34	16	9	9	56	43	+13	57	MLS Cup Conference Semifinals
3	Chicago Fire	34	16	11	7	62	48	+14	55	MLS Cup Knockout Round
4	Atlanta United FC	34	15	9	10	70	40	+30	55	MLS Cup Knockout Round
5	Columbus Crew	34	16	12	6	53	49	+4	54	MLS Cup Knockout Round
6	New York Red Bulls	34	14	12	8	53	47	+6	50	MLS Cup Knockout Round
7	New England Revolution	34	13	15	6	53	61	−8	45	
8	Philadelphia Union	34	11	14	9	50	47	+3	42	
9	Montreal Impact	34	11	17	6	52	58	−6	39	
10	Orlando City SC	34	10	15	9	39	58	−19	39	
11	D.C. United	34	9	20	5	31	60	−29	32	

Source: MLS

=== Overall table ===
Pos	Team	Pld	W	L	T	GF	GA	GD	Pts	Qualification
1	Toronto FC (C, S)	34	20	5	9	74	37	+37	69	CONCACAF Champions League
2	New York City FC	34	16	9	9	56	43	+13	57	
3	Chicago Fire	34	16	11	7	61	47	+14	55	
4	Atlanta United FC	34	15	9	10	70	40	+30	55	
5	Columbus Crew	34	16	12	6	53	49	+4	54	
6	Portland Timbers	34	15	11	8	60	50	+10	53	
7	Seattle Sounders FC	34	14	9	11	52	39	+13	53	
8	Vancouver Whitecaps FC	34	15	12	7	50	49	+1	52	
9	New York Red Bulls	34	14	12	8	53	47	+6	50	
10	Houston Dynamo	34	13	10	11	57	45	+12	50	
11	Sporting Kansas City	34	12	9	13	40	29	+11	49	CONCACAF Champions League
12	San Jose Earthquakes	34	13	14	7	39	60	−21	46	
13	FC Dallas	34	11	10	13	48	48	0	46	
14	Real Salt Lake	34	13	15	6	49	55	−6	45	
15	New England Revolution	34	13	15	6	53	61	−8	45	
16	Philadelphia Union	34	11	14	9	50	47	+3	42	
17	Montreal Impact	34	11	17	6	52	58	−6	39	
18	Orlando City SC	34	10	15	9	39	58	−19	39	
19	Minnesota United FC	34	10	18	6	47	70	−23	36	
20	Colorado Rapids	34	9	19	6	31	51	−20	33	
21	D.C. United	34	9	20	5	31	60	−29	32	
22	LA Galaxy	34	8	18	8	45	67	−22	32	

Source: MLS
Rules for classification: 1) points; 2) total wins; 3) total goal differential; 4) total goals scored; 5) disciplinary points; 6) away goals scored; 7) away goal differential; 8) coin toss or drawing of lots
(C) MLS Cup Champion; (S) Supporters' Shield

=== Results summary ===
Overall								Home						Away					
Pld	Pts	W	L	T	GF	GA	GD	W	L	T	GF	GA	GD	W	L	T	GF	GA	GD
34	55	16	11	7	61	47	+14	12	2	3	41	14	+27	4	9	4	20	33	−13

Last updated: October 22, 2017
Source: MLSsoccer.com standings
Pld = Matches played; Pts = Points; W = Matches won; T = Matches tied; L = Matches lost; GF = Goals for; GA = Goals against; GD = Goal difference

== Match results ==
Win Tie Loss

=== Preseason ===
Kickoff times are in CST (UTC-06)

Saturday, February 4, 2017	Chicago Fire	1–0	Florida Gulf Coast University	Fort Myers, Florida
18:00	Nemanja Nikolić 41'	Report		Stadium: FGCU Soccer Complex

Thursday, February 9, 2017	Chicago Fire	1–0	Philadelphia Union	Bradenton, Florida
12:00	Patrick Doody (yellow card) 49'; Michael de Leeuw 56'	Report	Roland Alberg (yellow card) 39'	Stadium: IMG Academy

Wednesday, February 15, 2017	Chicago Fire	4–1	Montreal Impact	St. Petersburg, Florida
10:00	David Accam 1'; Dax McCarty 15'; Kyle Fisher 18' (o.g.); Nemanja Nikolić 64'	Report	Ballou Jean-Yves Tabla (yellow card) 30'; Laurent Ciman (yellow card) 52'; Ignacio Piatti 88' (pen.)	Stadium: Al Lang Stadium

Sunday, February 19, 2017	Chicago Fire	5–2	Miami FC	Bradenton, Florida
17:00	Luis Solignac 3'; John Goossens 42' (pen.); Arturo Álvarez 49'; David Arshakyan 52'; David Accam 63'; João Meira (yellow card) 87'	Report	Dylan Mares 38'; Ariel Martínez 71' (pen.); Unknown player (yellow card) 73'	Stadium: IMG Academy

Wednesday, February 22, 2017	Chicago Fire	3–2	FC Cincinnati	Bradenton, Florida
16:00	Luis Solignac 31'; Djordje Mihailovic (yellow card) 67'; Michael de Leeuw 70'; Drew Conner (yellow card) 72'; Patrick Doody (yellow card) 74'; Matej Dekovic 89'	Report	Aodhan Quinn (yellow card) 21'; Marco Dominguez (yellow card) 85'; Djiby Fall 88'; Paul Nicholson 90+1'	Stadium: IMG Academy

Saturday, February 25, 2017 Suncoast Invitational	Chicago Fire	4–1	Toronto FC	St. Petersburg, Florida
14:00	Juninho 9'; Nemanja Nikolić 16' (pen.); Michael de Leeuw 39', 74'	Report	Clément Simonin (yellow card) 61'; Tosaint Ricketts 89' (pen.)	Stadium: Al Lang Stadium

=== Major League Soccer ===
Kickoff times are in CDT (UTC-05), unless posted otherwise

Saturday, March 4, 2017 1	Columbus Crew SC	1–1	Chicago Fire	Columbus, Ohio
13:00 CST (UTC-06)	Finlay 17'; Higuaín (yellow card) 41'	Report	Accam 73'; Goossens (yellow card) 81'	Stadium: Mapfre Stadium; Attendance: 15,023; Referee: Fotis Bazakos

Saturday, March 11, 2017 2	Chicago Fire	2–0	Real Salt Lake	Bridgeview, Illinois
13:00 CST (UTC-06)	Nikolić 11'; Álvarez 15'	Report	Wingert (yellow card) 79'	Stadium: Toyota Park; Attendance: 13,024; Referee: Kevin Stott

Saturday, March 18, 2017 3	Atlanta United FC	4–0	Chicago Fire	Atlanta, Georgia
15:00	Vincent 4' (o.g.); Gressel (yellow card) 15'; Almirón (yellow card) 45'; Martínez 60', 82'; Villalba 67'	Report	Kappelhof (red card) 11'; Bava (yellow card) 18'	Stadium: Bobby Dodd Stadium; Attendance: 45,922; Referee: Jose Carlos Rivero

Saturday, April 1, 2017 4	Chicago Fire	2–2	Montreal Impact	Bridgeview, Illinois
14:00	Schweinsteiger 17'; Júnior (yellow card) 41' (yellow-red card) 71'; Solignac 90+3'	Recap	Duvall (yellow card) 57'; Arregui (yellow card) 60'; Mancosu 61'; Cabrera (yellow card) 76' (red card) 80'; Lovitz (yellow card) 78'; Tabla 90'	Stadium: Toyota Park; Attendance: 15,103; Referee: Ismail Elfath

Saturday, April 8, 2017 5	Chicago Fire	1–0	Columbus Crew SC	Bridgeview, Illinois
13:00	Nikolić 22'; McCarty (yellow card) 86'	Report	Crognale (yellow card) 84'	Stadium: Toyota Park; Attendance: 16,434; Referee: Alan Kelly

Saturday, April 15, 2017 6	Chicago Fire	3–0	New England Revolution	Bridgeview, Illinois
16:00	Schweinsteiger 45'; Nikolić 47', 73'; Kappelhof (yellow card) 77'	Recap	Watson (yellow card) 21' (yellow-red card) 27'	Stadium: Toyota Park; Attendance: 16,914; Referee: Ted Unkel

Friday, April 21, 2017 7	Toronto FC	3–1	Chicago Fire	Toronto, Ontario
18:30	Giovinco 28', 82'; Zavaleta 32'; Osorio (yellow card) 85'	Report	McCarty (yellow card) 15'; Kappelhof (yellow card) 24'; Accam 88'	Stadium: BMO Field; Attendance: 27,097; Referee: Silviu Petrescu

Saturday, April 29, 2017 8	New York Red Bulls	2–1	Chicago Fire	Harrison, New Jersey
18:30	Wright-Phillips 37'; Muyl (yellow card) 51'; Lade (yellow card) 61'; Lawrence 71'; Martins (yellow card) 81'; Gulbrandsen (yellow card) 87'		Nikolić 59'	Stadium: Red Bull Arena; Attendance: 22,814; Referee: Hilario Grajeda

Saturday, May 6, 2017 9	LA Galaxy	2–2	Chicago Fire	Carson, California
21:30	Steres 56'; Santos 65'; Alessandrini (yellow card) 74'	Report	Accam 13' (pen.); Nikolić 16'; Vincent (yellow card) 60'; Schweinsteiger (yellow card) 90'	Stadium: StubHub Center; Attendance: 24,256; Referee: Kevin Stott

Saturday, May 13, 2017 10	Chicago Fire	4–1	Seattle Sounders FC	Bridgeview, Illinois
20:00	Nikolić 25' (pen.), 76'; Lampson (yellow card) 48'; Accam 60'; Solignac 73'; Brandon Vincent (yellow card) 78'	Report	Frei (yellow card) 26'; Dempsey 28'; Jones (yellow card) 87' (yellow-red card) 89'	Stadium: Toyota Park; Attendance: 20,153; Referee: Nima Saghafi

Wednesday, May 17, 2017 11	Chicago Fire	3–0	Colorado Rapids	Bridgeview, Illinois
19:30	Nikolić 15', 74'; Accam 57'	Report	Azira (yellow card) 62'	Stadium: Toyota Park; Attendance: 11,244; Referee: Armando Villarreal

Saturday, May 20, 2017 12	D.C. United	0–1	Chicago Fire	Washington, D.C.
15:00	Sarvas (yellow card) 8'; Neagle (yellow card) 64'	Report	Accam 52'; Schweinsteiger (yellow card) 66'	Stadium: Robert F. Kennedy Memorial Stadium; Attendance: 20,618; Referee: Hilario Grajeda

Thursday, May 25, 2017 13	Chicago Fire	2–1	FC Dallas	Bridgeview, Illinois
19:30	Nikolić 3'; Accam 9'; Solignac (yellow card) 18'; Kappelhof (yellow card) 82'	Report	Lamah 6'; Gruezo (yellow card) 21'; Guillen (yellow card) 23'; Hume (yellow card) 45'; Hedges (yellow card) 70'	Stadium: Toyota Park; Attendance: 12,584; Referee: Jose Carlos Rivero

Sunday, June 4, 2017 14	Orlando City SC	0–0	Chicago Fire	Orlando, Florida
18:30	Ramos (red card) 26'; Nocerino (red card) 66'	Report	Leeuw (yellow card) 60'; Arshakyan (yellow card) 81'	Stadium: Orlando City Stadium; Attendance: 24,469; Referee: Ted Unkel

Saturday, June 10, 2017 15	Chicago Fire	2–0	Atlanta United FC	Bridgeview, Illinois
15:00	Solignac 29'; Schweinsteiger (yellow card) 50'; Accam (yellow card) 59'; Nikolić 70' (pen.)	Report	Kratz (yellow card) 39'; Carmona (yellow card) 67'	Stadium: Toyota Park; Attendance: 18,453; Referee: Alan Kelly

Saturday, June 17, 2017 16	New England Revolution	1–2	Chicago Fire	Foxborough, Massachusetts
19:30	Rowe (yellow card) 21'; Mlinar 70'	Report	Nikolić 18'; Solignac 61'	Stadium: Gillette Stadium; Attendance: 21,548; Referee: Kevin Stott

Saturday, June 24, 2017 17	Chicago Fire	4–0	Orlando City SC	Bridgeview, Illinois
19:30	Accam 3', 8', 63' (pen.); Nikolić 52', (yellow card) 69'; Schweinsteiger (yellow card) 53'; Leeuw (yellow card) 56'	Report	Johnson (yellow card) 22'; Higuita (yellow card) 33'; Kaká (yellow card) 58'; PC (yellow card) 84'	Stadium: Toyota Park; Attendance: 20,000; Referee: Jorge Gonzalez

Saturday, July 1, 2017 18	Chicago Fire	4–0	Vancouver Whitecaps FC	Bridgeview, Illinois
18:00	Nikolić 14', 18'; Álvarez 25'; Leeuw 84'	Report	Laba (red card) 78'	Stadium: Toyota Park; Attendance: 20,187; Referee: Ismail Elfath

Wednesday, July 5, 2017 19	Portland Timbers	2–2	Chicago Fire	Portland, Oregon
21:30	Adi 24' (pen.); Blanco 70', (yellow card) 73'	Report	Álvarez 34'; Vincent 61'; Lampson (yellow card) 65'	Stadium: Providence Park; Attendance: 21,144; Referee: Robert Sibiga

Saturday, July 22, 2017 20	New York City FC	2–1	Chicago Fire	New York, New York
13:00	Herrera (yellow card) (yellow-red card) 8'; Villa 47'; Brillant 50', (yellow card) 87'; Johnson (yellow card) 60'; Harrison (yellow card) 83'	Report	Meira (yellow card) 44'; Accam 54'; Kappelhof (yellow card) 61'	Stadium: Yankee Stadium; Attendance: 26,025; Referee: Allen Chapman

Saturday, July 29, 2017 21	Sporting Kansas City	3–2	Chicago Fire	Kansas City, Kansas
19:00	Sallói 23'; Feilhaber 45+1'; Blessing 51'	Report	Besler 28' (o.g.); Júnior (yellow card) 76'; Accam 78'; Meira (yellow card) 90'	Stadium: Children's Mercy Park; Attendance: 20,313; Referee: Alan Kelly

Saturday, August 5, 2017 22	Chicago Fire	4–1	New England Revolution	Bridgeview, Illinois
19:30	Polster 8'; Júnior 39'; Accam (yellow card) 45+1'; Leeuw 49', (yellow card) 64'; Campbell (yellow card) 80'; Solignac 90+2'	Report	Kamara 24'; Angoua (yellow card) 44'	Stadium: Toyota Park; Attendance: 20,214; Referee: Silviu Petrescu

Saturday, August 12, 2017 23	Columbus Crew SC	3–1	Chicago Fire	Columbus, Ohio
18:30	Manneh 18'; Meram (yellow card) 59', (goal) 73'; Mensah (yellow card) 67'; Kamara 88' (pen.)	Report	Leeuw 13'; Meira (yellow card) 26'; Polster (yellow card) 73'; Lampson (yellow card) 89'	Stadium: Mapfre Stadium; Attendance: 18,690; Referee: Armando Villarreal

Wednesday, August 16, 2017 24	Montreal Impact	3–0	Chicago Fire	Montreal, Quebec
18:30	Piatti 6', 38'; Cabrera (yellow card) 20'; Mancosu 37' (pen.); Duvall (yellow card) 48'; Piette (yellow card) 78'	Report	Matt Lampson (yellow card) 36'	Stadium: Saputo Stadium; Attendance: 19,894; Referee: Nima Saghafi

Saturday, August 19, 2017 25	Chicago Fire	1–3	Toronto FC	Bridgeview, Illinois
19:00	David Accam 54'	Report	Bradley (yellow card) 5'; Delgado 13'; Hasler 63'; Zavaleta (yellow card) 75'; Giovinco 90'	Stadium: Toyota Park; Attendance: 21,891; Referee: Jair Marufo

Saturday, August 26, 2017 26	Chicago Fire	1–2	Minnesota United FC	Bridgeview, Illinois
19:30	McCarty (yellow card) 69'; Accam 77'; Schweinsteiger (yellow card) 84'	Report	Danladi 36', 45', (yellow card) 78'	Stadium: Toyota Park; Attendance: 18,048; Referee: Kevin Stott

Saturday, September 2, 2017 27	Montreal Impact	0–1	Chicago Fire	Montreal, Quebec
18:00	Boldor (red card) 50'; Donadel (yellow card) 70'	Report	Júnior (yellow card) 38'; Schweinsteiger 59'; Leeuw (yellow card) 90+2'	Stadium: Saputo Stadium; Attendance: 19,619; Referee: Baldomero Toledo

Saturday, September 9, 2017	Chicago Fire	1–1	New York Red Bulls	Bridgeview, Illinois
15:00	Campbell (yellow card) 57'; Nikolić 66'; Alvarez (yellow card) 73'; Leeuw (yellow card) 76'	Report	Wright-Phillips 7'; Zizzo (yellow card) 31'	Stadium: Toyota Park; Attendance: 17,808; Referee: Alan Kelly

Saturday, September 16, 2017 29	Chicago Fire	3–0	D.C. United	Bridgeview, Illinois
19:30	Vincent (yellow card) 15', (goal) 62'; Harkes (o.g.); Nikolić 90' (pen.)	Recap		Stadium: Toyota Park; Attendance: 15,643; Referee: Ismail Elfath

Saturday, September 23, 2017 30	Philadelphia Union	3–1	Chicago Fire	Chester, Pennsylvania
18:00	Pontius 10', 55'; Sapong 64'; Rosenberry (yellow card) 85'; Creavalle (yellow card) 86'	Report	Polster (yellow card) 16'; Kappelhof (yellow card) 42'; Solignac 67'	Stadium: Talen Energy Stadium; Attendance: 18,619; Referee: Robert Sibiga

Wednesday, September 27, 2017 31	San Jose Earthquakes	1-4	Chicago Fire	San Jose, California
21:30	Jungwirth (yellow card) 35'; Godoy (yellow card) 39'; Yueill (yellow card) 67'; Wondolowski 87'	Report	Mihailovic 14'; Alvarez (yellow card) 26'; Solignac 40'; Nikolić 48', 65'	Stadium: Avaya Stadium; Attendance: 17,256; Referee: Drew Fischer

Saturday, September 30, 2017 32	Chicago Fire	1-1	New York City FC	Bridgeview, Illinois
19:30	McCarty (yellow card) 16'; Nikolić 20'	Report	Villa 43'; Morález (yellow card) 73'	Stadium: Toyota Park; Attendance: 20,195; Referee: Jose Carlos Rivero

Sunday, October 15, 2017 33	Chicago Fire	3-2	Philadelphia Union	Bridgeview, Illinois
16:00	Nemanja Nikolić 3', 64' (pen.); Matt Polster (yellow card) 45+1'		Johan Kappelhof (o.g.); Alejandro Bedoya 13'	Stadium: Toyota Park; Attendance: 17,616; Referee: Allen Chapman

Sunday, October 22, 2017 34	Houston Dynamo	3-0	Chicago Fire	Houston, Texas
15:00	Leonardo 2'; Romell Quioto 68'; Mauro Manotas 75'	Report		Stadium: BBVA Compass Stadium; Attendance: 20,456; Referee: Alan Kelly

=== MLS Cup Playoffs ===
Kickoff times are in CDT (UTC-05)

October 25, 2017 Knockout Round	Chicago Fire	0-4	New York Red Bulls	Bridgeview, Illinois
19:30		Report	Wright-Phillips 7'; Kljestan 11'; Royer 70'; Verón (yellow card) 85', (goal) 87'	Stadium: Toyota Park; Attendance: 11,647; Referee: Ismail Elfath

=== U.S. Open Cup ===
Kickoff times are in CDT (UTC-05)

Wednesday, June 14, 2017 4th Round	Saint Louis FC	0–1	Chicago Fire	Fenton, Missouri
19:30	Octavio Guzmán (yellow card) 29'; Dragan Stojkov (yellow card) 68' (yellow-red card) 81'	Report	Luis Solignac 27'; Dax McCarty (yellow card) 43'; Juninho (yellow card) 71'; Brandon Vincent (yellow card) 85'	Stadium: Toyota Stadium; Attendance: 5,786; Referee: Jon Freemon

June 28, 2017 Round of 16	FC Cincinnati	0–0 (a.e.t.) (3–1 p)	Chicago Fire	Cincinnati, Ohio
18:30	Josu (yellow card) 55'; Andrew Wiedeman (yellow card) 109'	Report	Matt Polster (yellow card) 46'; Nemanja Nikolić (yellow card) 72'	Stadium: Nippert Stadium; Attendance: 32,287; Referee: Hilario Grajeda
	Penalties
	Aodhan Quinn (penalty missed); Josu (penalty scored); Harrison Delbridge (penalty scored); Jimmy McLaughlin (penalty scored)		Nemanja Nikolić (penalty missed); Arturo Álvarez (penalty missed); Bastian Schweinsteiger (penalty scored); Juninho (penalty missed)

== Squad statistics ==
=== Games Played ===
No.	Pos.	Nat.	Name	MLS			Playoffs			Open Cup			Total		
No.	Pos.	Nat.	Name	Starts	Apps	Minutes	Starts	Apps	Minutes	Starts	Apps	Minutes	Starts	Apps	Minutes
1	GK	URU	Jorge Bava	8	8	720	0	0	0	0	0	0	8	8	720
2	MF	USA	Matt Polster	21	22	1,769	1	1	90	1	2	152	23	25	2,011
3	DF	USA	Brandon Vincent	26	27	2,341	1	1	90	2	2	210	29	30	2,641
4	DF	NED	Johan Kappelhof	33	33	2,881	1	1	90	2	2	210	36	36	3,181
5	DF	USA	Michael Harrington	9	9	798	0	0	0	0	0	0	9	9	798
6	MF	USA	Dax McCarty	28	28	2,465	1	1	90	1	1	58	30	30	2,613
7	MF	NED	John Goossens	1	1	89	0	0	0	0	0	0	1	1	89
8	FW	NED	Michael de Leeuw	26	30	2,189	0	0	0	2	2	192	28	32	2,381
9	FW	ARG	Luis Solignac	26	33	2,153	1	1	90	1	2	161	28	36	2,404
10	FW	ARM	David Arshakyan	0	7	27	0	1	20	0	0	0	0	8	47
11	MF/FW	GHA	David Accam	24	30	2,177	1	1	90	0	0	0	25	31	2,267
12	MF	SLV	Arturo Álvarez	13	25	1,084	0	1	20	2	2	210	15	28	1,314
13	MF	USA	Brandt Bronico	0	4	53	0	0	0	0	0	0	0	4	53
14	MF	USA	Djordje Mihailovic	7	17	732	1	1	65	0	1	33	7	18	830
15	MF	USA	Joey Calistri	0	0	0	0	0	0	0	0	0	0	0	0
16	DF	USA	Jonathan Campbell	8	24	919	0	0	0	2	2	210	10	26	1,129
17	MF	USA/PER	Collin Fernandez	0	0	0	0	0	0	0	0	0	0	0	0
18	MF	USA	Drew Conner	8	21	882	0	0	0	2	2	135	10	23	1,017
19	MF	BRA	Juninho	17	21	1,528	1	1	70	2	2	210	20	24	1,808
20	MF	USA	Daniel Johnson	0	8	125	0	0	0	1	2	75	1	9	200
22	DF	USA	Patrick Doody	7	7	629	0	0	0	0	0	0	7	7	629
23	FW	HUN	Nemanja Nikolić	34	34	2,946	1	1	90	1	1	120	36	36	3,156
25	DF	CUB	Jorge Luis Corrales	0	0	0	0	0	0	0	0	0	0	0	0
26	DF	USA	Christian Dean	2	3	220	0	0	0	0	0	0	2	3	220
28	GK	USA	Matt Lampson	24	24	2,160	1	1	90	2	2	210	27	27	2,460
30	GK	USA	Stefan Cleveland	0	0	0	0	0	0	0	0	0	0	0	0
31	MF	GER	Bastian Schweinsteiger	23	24	1,993	0	1	25	1	1	120	24	25	2,138
33	DF	CRO	Matej Dekovic	0	0	0	0	0	0	0	1	4	0	1	4
45	GK	MEX	Richard Sánchez	2	2	180	0	0	0	0	0	0	2	2	180
66	DF/MF	POR	João Meira	27	30	2,412	1	1	70	0	0	0	27	30	2,482

=== Goalkeeping Statistics ===
No.	Pos.	Nat.	Name	MLS			Playoffs			Open Cup			Total		
No.	Pos.	Nat.	Name	Clean sheets	Saves	GA	Clean sheets	Saves	GA	Clean sheets	Saves	GA	Clean sheets	Saves	GA
1	GK	URU	Jorge Bava	3	20	12	0	0	0	0	0	0	3	20	12
28	GK	USA	Matt Lampson	8	58	31	0	2	4	2	9	0	10	67	31
30	GK	USA	Stefan Cleveland	0	0	0	0	0	0	0	0	0	0	0	0
45	GK	MEX	Richard Sánchez	0	11	4	0	0	0	0	0	0	0	11	4

=== Goalscoring and Assisting Record ===
MLS Regular Season
Rank	Player	Goal	A
1	(Hungary) Nemanja Nikolić	24	4
2	(Ghana) David Accam	14	8
3	(Argentina) Luis Solignac	7	4
4	(Netherlands) Michael de Leeuw	3	8
5	(Germany) Bastian Schweinsteiger	3	6
6	(El Salvador) Arturo Álvarez	3	2
7	(United States) Brandon Vincent	2	5
8	(United States) Matt Polster	1	7
9	(Brazil) Juninho	1	2
9	(United States) Djordje Mihailovic	1	2
11	(United States) Dax McCarty	0	5
12	(United States) Patrick Doody	0	4
12	(Netherlands) Johan Kappelhof	0	4
14	(Portugal) João Meira	0	2
15	(United States) Drew Conner	0	1

U.S. Open Cup
Rank	Player	Goal	A
1	(Argentina) Luis Solignac	1	0
2	(United States) Brandon Vincent	0	1

All Competitions
Rank	Player	Goal	A
1	(Hungary) Nemanja Nikolić	24	4
2	(Ghana) David Accam	14	8
3	(Argentina) Luis Solignac	8	4
4	(Netherlands) Michael de Leeuw	3	8
5	(Germany) Bastian Schweinsteiger	3	6
6	(El Salvador) Arturo Álvarez	3	2
7	(United States) Brandon Vincent	2	6
8	(United States) Matt Polster	1	7
9	(Brazil) Juninho	1	2
9	(United States) Djordje Mihailovic	1	2
11	(United States) Dax McCarty	0	5
12	(United States) Patrick Doody	0	4
12	(Netherlands) Johan Kappelhof	0	4
14	(Portugal) João Meira	0	2
15	(United States) Drew Conner	0	1

Updated to match played on October 22, 2017.
Source: MLSsoccer.com statistics – 2017 Chicago Fire

=== Disciplinary record ===
MLS Regular Season
Rank	Player	Booked	(yellow card) (yellow-red card)	Sent off (straight red)	Matches Missed
1	(Netherlands) Johan Kappelhof	5	0	1	April 1 vs Montreal
2	(Brazil) Juninho	2	1	0	April 8 vs Columbus
3	(Netherlands) Michael de Leeuw	5	0	0	September 16 vs DC United
3	(Germany) Bastian Schweinsteiger	5	0	0	
4	(United States) Dax McCarty	4	0	0	
5	(United States) Matt Lampson	3	0	0	
5	(Portugal) João Meira	3	0	0	
5	(United States) Matt Polster	3	0	0	
5	(United States) Brandon Vincent	3	0	0	
9	(Ghana) David Accam	2	0	0	
9	(El Salvador) Arturo Álvarez	2	0	0	
9	(United States) Jonathan Campbell	2	0	0	
13	(Armenia) David Arshakyan	1	0	0	
13	(Uruguay) Jorge Bava	1	0	0	
13	(Netherlands) John Goossens	1	0	0	
13	(Hungary) Nemanja Nikolić	1	0	0	
13	(Argentina) Luis Solignac	1	0	0	

U.S. Open Cup
Rank	Player	Booked	(yellow card) (yellow-red card)	Sent off (straight red)	Matches Missed
1	(Brazil) Juninho	1	0	0	
1	(United States) Dax McCarty	1	0	0	
1	(Hungary) Nemanja Nikolić	1	0	0	
1	(United States) Matt Polster	1	0	0	
1	(United States) Brandon Vincent	1	0	0	
Unranked	(Ghana) David Accam	0	0	0	June 14 vs Saint Louis FC

MLS Regular Season
Rank	Player	Booked	(yellow card) (yellow-red card)	Sent off (straight red)	Matches Missed
1	(Netherlands) Johan Kappelhof	5	0	1	April 1 vs Montreal
2	(Brazil) Juninho	3	1	0	April 8 vs Columbus
3	(Netherlands) Michael de Leeuw	5	0	0	September 16 vs DC United
3	(United States) Dax McCarty	5	0	0	
3	(Germany) Bastian Schweinsteiger	5	0	0	
6	(United States) Matt Polster	4	0	0	
7	(United States) Matt Lampson	3	0	0	
7	(Portugal) João Meira	3	0	0	
7	(United States) Brandon Vincent	3	0	0	
10	(Ghana) David Accam	2	0	0	
10	(El Salvador) Arturo Álvarez	2	0	0	
10	(United States) Jonathan Campbell	2	0	0	
10	(Hungary) Nemanja Nikolić	2	0	0	
14	(Armenia) David Arshakyan	1	0	0	
14	(Uruguay) Jorge Bava	1	0	0	
14	(Netherlands) John Goossens	1	0	0	
14	(Argentina) Luis Solignac	1	0	0	

Updated to match played on October 22, 2017.
Source: MLSsoccer.com statistics – 2017 Chicago Fire

== Awards ==
=== MLS End of Year Awards ===
Award	Player	Statistics	Report
MLS Golden Boot	(Hungary) Nemanja Nikolić	24 goals, 4 assists in 34 matches	Report
MLS Best XI	(Hungary) Nemanja Nikolić	Forward	Report

=== MLS Player of the Month ===
Month	Player	Statistics	Report
May	(Hungary) Nemanja Nikolić	6 goals, 1 assist in 5 matches	Report

=== MLS Player of the Week ===
Week	Player	Statistics	Report
7	(Hungary) Nemanja Nikolić	2 goals against New England Revolution	Report
17	(Ghana) David Accam	3 goals, 1 assist against Orlando City SC	Report
18	(Hungary) Nemanja Nikolić	2 goals, 1 assist against Vancouver Whitecaps FC	Report
32	(Hungary) Nemanja Nikolić	3 goals against Philadelphia Union	

=== MLS Team of the Week ===
Week	Player	Position	Report
1	(Ghana) David Accam	F	Report
2	(Netherlands) Johan Kappelhof	D	Report
2	(United States) Dax McCarty	M	Report
5	(Germany) Bastian Schweinsteiger	M	Report
6	(United States) Dax McCarty	M	Report
7	(Argentina) Luis Solignac	F	Report
7	(Hungary) Nemanja Nikolić	F	Report
7	(United States) Dax McCarty	Bench	Report
7	(Germany) Bastian Schweinsteiger	Bench	Report
10	(Ghana) David Accam	Bench	Report
11	(Ghana) David Accam	M	Report
11	(Hungary) Nemanja Nikolić	F	Report
11	(United States) Brandon Vincent	Bench	Report
12	(United States) Brandon Vincent	D	Report
12	(Hungary) Nemanja Nikolić	F	Report
12	(Ghana) David Accam	Bench	Report
12	(Serbia) Veljko Paunović	Coach	Report
13	(United States) Brandon Vincent	D	Report
15	(Portugal) João Meira	D	Report
15	(Ghana) David Accam	M	Report
15	(Germany) Bastian Schweinsteiger	M	Report
15	(Hungary) Nemanja Nikolić	F	Report
15	(Netherlands) Michael de Leeuw	Bench	Report
15	(United States) Matt Polster	Bench	Report
15	(Serbia) Veljko Paunović	Coach	Report
16	(United States) Dax McCarty	Bench	Report
17	(United States) Matt Polster	D	Report
17	(Ghana) David Accam	M	Report
17	(Germany) Bastian Schweinsteiger	Bench	Report
17	(Serbia) Veljko Paunović	Coach	Report
18	(United States) Matt Polster	D	Report
18	(Hungary) Nemanja Nikolić	F	Report
22	(United States) Patrick Doody	D	Report
26	(United States) Matt Polster	D	Report
26	(Brazil) Juninho	Bench	Report
27	(United States) Brandon Vincent	D	Report
30	(United States) Djordje Mihailovic	M	Report
30	(Hungary) Nemanja Nikolić	F	Report
32	(Hungary) Nemanja Nikolić	F	Report
32	(United States) Djordje Mihailovic	Bench	Report

=== MLS Goal of the Week ===
Week	Player	Goal	Match Result	Report
32	(Hungary) Nemanja Nikolić	1-0 vs Philadelphia Union	3-2	Report

=== MLS All-Star Game ===
Selected	Player	Position	Report
Fan XI	(Germany) Bastian Schweinsteiger	M	Report
Fan XI	(Hungary) Nemanja Nikolić	F	Report
Coach's Pick	(Netherlands) Johan Kappelhof	D	Report
Coach's Pick	(United States) Dax McCarty	M	Report
MLS	(Serbia) Veljko Paunovic	Coach	Report

=== MLS Homegrown Game ===
Player	Position	Report
(United States) Djordje Mihailovic	M	Report

== National team call-ups ==
El Salvador
Arturo Álvarez

- Friendly vs Canada, October 8 (Started, played 89 minutes)

Ghana
David Accam

- Friendly vs Mexico, June 28 (Subbed on, played 31 minutes)
- Friendly vs United States, July 1 (Started, played 45 minutes)

United States
Dax McCarty

- Friendly vs Serbia, January 29 (Did not play)
- Friendly vs Jamaica, February 3 (Started, played 63 minutes)
- World Cup qualifier vs Honduras, March 24 (Did not play)
- World Cup qualifier at Panama, March 28 (Did not play)
- Friendly vs Venezuela, June 3 (Did not play)
- World Cup qualifier vs Trinidad and Tobago, June 8 (Did not play)
- World Cup qualifier at Mexico, June 11 (Did not play)
- Friendly vs Ghana (Started, played 90 minutes)
- 2017 CONCACAF Gold Cup

- vs Panama, July 8 (Started, played 90 minutes)
- vs Martinique, July 12 (Subbed on, played four minutes)
- vs Nicaragua, July 15 (Started, played 90 minutes)
- vs El Salvador, July 19 (Did not play)
- vs Costa Rica, July 22 (Subbed on, played five minutes)
- vs Jamaica, July 26 (Subbed on, played one minute)

- World Cup qualifier vs Costa Rica, September 1 (Did not play)
- World Cup qualifier at Honduras, September 5 (Did not play)
- World Cup qualifier vs Panama, October 6 (Subbed on, played 33 minutes)
- World Cup qualifier at Trinidad and Tobago, October 10 (Did not play)

Matt Polster

- 2017 CONCACAF Gold Cup Preliminary Roster (Was not selected)

== Kits ==
Home	Away

Type	Shirt	Shorts	Socks	Info
Home	Red	Red	Red	
Away	Gray	Gray	Gray	

=== Primary kit ===
According to the league's bi-annual rotation of kits the primary kit carried over from the previous season. It was originally unveiled on January 25, 2016. The jersey features an all-red design with the return of the iconic white bar across the chest. The Chicago city flag embossed on the lower front for the jersey's jock tag.

=== Secondary kit ===
The new secondary kit has been unveiled by the club on February 6, 2017. It's gray color is based on the same tone as the center of the club's logo. The jersey has the high V-neck collar and features blue numbers, names and trim, with red accents and "EST. 1997" on jock tag. The back neck tape has crossed axes, as the primary kit. Six-pointed stars from Chicago city flag are placed on the sleeve trim as well as socks.

== Draft pick trades ==
Picks acquired:

- 2017 MLS SuperDraft natural first round pick (No. 11), General Allocation Money, Targeted Allocation Money, discovery rights to an unnamed player, and the #2 ranking in the MLS Allocation Order from Philadelphia Union in exchange for the #1 ranking in the MLS Allocation Order. Philadelphia used the #1 allocation ranking to acquire midfielder Alejandro Bedoya.
- 2017 MLS SuperDraft No. 26 and 27 overall picks (second round) from Toronto FC in exchange for $75,000 in Targeted Allocation Money.
- 2019 MLS SuperDraft natural third round pick from D.C. United in exchange for forward Kennedy Igboananike.
- 2019 MLS SuperDraft natural third round pick from Minnesota United FC in exchange for the first spot in the MLS Waiver Order.

Picks traded:

- 2017 MLS SuperDraft natural first round pick (No. 3) to New York City FC in exchange for $250,000 in General Allocation Money.
- 2017 MLS SuperDraft natural second round pick to Columbus Crew SC in exchange for the Discovery Priority on Khaly Thiam. Pursuant to the trade agreement, if Thiam started in 12 or more 2016 MLS regular season games, or if his loan was extended or successfully converted into a transfer following the 2016 season, Columbus would receive General Allocation Money instead of the SuperDraft pick. As Thiam started in 12 or more regular season games, Fire retained the pick. This second round natural selection was traded to Minnesota United FC, together with the No. 3 ranking in the MLS Allocation Order, and general allocation money in exchange for the No. 2 ranking in the MLS Allocation Order. Chicago Fire used its allocation ranking to acquire midfielder Juninho (No. 1 spot holder Atlanta United FC passed on the player).
- 2018 MLS SuperDraft conditional pick to Portland Timbers in exchange for the No. 6 ranking in the MLS Allocation Order, which it then used to sign goalkeeper Richard Sánchez (all previous holders opted not to sign him); if he starts at least five games, Portland receives the Fire's natural second round pick- if he doesn't, they receive the natural third round pick
