= List of Major League Soccer transfers 2017 =

The following is a list of transfers for the 2017 Major League Soccer season that have been made during the 2016-17 MLS offseason all the way through to the roster freeze on September 15, 2017.

== Transfers ==
Date	Name	Moving from	Moving to	Mode of Transfer
October 6, 2016	Chris Goslin	(United States) USA U-17 national team	Atlanta United FC	Homegrown player
October 14, 2016	(United States) Marco Farfan	(United States) Portland Timbers 2	Portland Timbers	Homegrown player
October 20, 2016	(Canada) Ballou Jean-Yves Tabla	(Canada) FC Montreal	Montreal Impact	Homegrown player
November 4, 2016	(Canada) Karl Ouimette	(United States) Jacksonville Armada	New York Red Bulls	Loan Return
November 10, 2016	(Canada) Louis Béland-Goyette	(Canada) FC Montreal	Montreal Impact	Homegrown player
November 10, 2016	(Israel) Omer Damari	New York Red Bulls	(Germany) RB Leipzig	Loan Return
November 17, 2016	(Colombia) Jesús Ferreira	(United States) FC Dallas Academy	FC Dallas	Homegrown player
November 21, 2016	(United States) Aaron Long	New York Red Bulls	(United States) New York Red Bulls II	Loan Return
November 21, 2016	(Trinidad and Tobago) Aubrey David	FC Dallas	(Costa Rica) Saprissa	Loan Return
November 21, 2016	(Colombia) Carlos Lizarazo	FC Dallas	(Mexico) Cruz Azul	Loan Return
November 21, 2016	(Brazil) Getterson	FC Dallas	(Brazil) J. Malucelli	Loan Return
November 22, 2016	(United States) Bryan Reynolds	(United States) FC Dallas Academy	FC Dallas	Homegrown player
November 23, 2016	(Brazil) Rodrigo Ramos	Chicago Fire	(Brazil) Coritiba	Loan Return
November 23, 2016	(Senegal) Khaly Thiam	Chicago Fire	(Hungary) MTK Budapest	Loan Return
November 23, 2016	(Romania) Răzvan Cociș	Chicago Fire	Unattached	Released
November 23, 2016	(United States) Eric Gehrig	Chicago Fire	Unattached	Released
November 23, 2016	(United States) Nick LaBrocca	Chicago Fire	Unattached	Released
November 23, 2016	(United States) Alex Morrell	Chicago Fire	Unattached	Released
November 23, 2016	(United States) Michael Stephens	Chicago Fire	Unattached	Released
November 28, 2016	(Colombia) Stiven Mendoza	New York City	(Brazil) Corinthians	Loan Return
November 28, 2016	(Argentina) Federico Bravo	New York City	(Argentina) Boca Juniors	Loan Return
November 30, 2016	(Paraguay) Pedro Báez	Real Salt Lake	(Paraguay) Cerro Porteño	Loan Return
December 1, 2016	(United States) Justin Davis	(United States) Minnesota United (NASL)	Minnesota United FC	Free
December 1, 2016	(United States) Kevin Venegas	(United States) Minnesota United (NASL)	Minnesota United FC	Free
December 2, 2016	(United States) Brandon Vazquez	(Mexico) Club Tijuana	Atlanta United FC	Discovery Signing
December 5, 2016	(Paraguay) Miguel Almirón	(Argentina) Lanús	Atlanta United FC	Undisclosed
December 5, 2016	(United States) Sean Okoli	(United States) FC Cincinnati	New York City	Free
December 8, 2016	(Canada) Fraser Aird	Vancouver Whitecaps FC	(Scotland) Rangers	Loan Return
December 8, 2016	(Costa Rica) Jordan Smith	Vancouver Whitecaps FC	(Costa Rica) Saprissa	Loan Return
December 9, 2016	(Argentina) Lucas Ontivero	Montreal Impact	(Turkey) Galatasaray	Loan Return
December 11, 2016	(United States) Michael Parkhurst	Columbus Crew SC	Atlanta United FC	Trade
December 11, 2016	(Jamaica) Romario Williams	Montreal Impact	Atlanta United FC	Trade
December 11, 2016	(Germany) Kevin Kratz	Philadelphia Union	Atlanta United FC	Trade
December 11, 2016	(England) Harrison Heath	Orlando City SC	Atlanta United FC	Trade
December 11, 2016	(United States) Sean Johnson	Chicago Fire	Atlanta United FC	Trade
December 11, 2016	(United States) Sean Johnson	Atlanta United FC	New York City	Trade
December 11, 2016	(United States) Joseph Greenspan	Colorado Rapids	Minnesota United FC	Trade
December 12, 2016	(Mexico) Miguel Aguilar	D.C. United	LA Galaxy	Trade
December 13, 2016	(United States) Donny Toia	Montreal Impact	Atlanta United FC	Expansion Draft
December 13, 2016	(United States) Chris Duvall	New York Red Bulls	Minnesota United FC	Expansion Draft
December 13. 2016	(United States) Zach Loyd	FC Dallas	Atlanta United FC	Expansion Draft
December 13, 2016	(United States) Collen Warner	Houston Dynamo	Minnesota United FC	Expansion Draft
December 13, 2016	(United States) Clint Irwin	Toronto FC	Atlanta United FC	Expansion Draft
December 13, 2016	(Sweden) Mohammed Saeid	Columbus Crew SC	Minnesota United FC	Expansion Draft
December 13, 2016	(United States) Mikey Ambrose	Orlando City SC	Atlanta United FC	Expansion Draft
December 13, 2016	(United States) Jeff Attinella	Real Salt Lake	Minnesota United FC	Expansion Draft
December 13, 2016	(United States) Alec Kann	Sporting Kansas City	Atlanta United FC	Expansion Draft
December 13, 2016	(Benin) Femi Hollinger-Janzen	New England Revolution	Minnesota United FC	Expansion Draft
December 13, 2016	(United States) Donny Toia	Atlanta United FC	Orlando City SC	Trade
December 13, 2016	(United States) Clint Irwin	Atlanta United FC	Toronto FC	Trade
December 13, 2016	(United States) Mark Bloom	Toronto FC	Atlanta United FC	Trade
December 13, 2016	(United States) Chris Duvall	Minnesota United FC	Montreal Impact	Trade
December 13, 2016	(Costa Rica) Johan Venegas	Montreal Impact	Minnesota United FC	Trade
December 13, 2016	(United States) Sheanon Williams	Houston Dynamo	Vancouver Whitecaps FC	Trade
December 13, 2016	(United States) Jermaine Jones	Colorado Rapids	LA Galaxy	Trade
December 14, 2016	(Ecuador) Aníbal Chalá	(Ecuador) El Nacional	FC Dallas	Undisclosed
December 14, 2016	(United States) Jeff Larentowicz	LA Galaxy	Atlanta United FC	Free Agent
December 16, 2016	(Belgium) Roland Lamah	(Hungary) Ferencváros	FC Dallas	Free
December 16, 2016	(United States) Dylan Remick	Seattle Sounders FC	Houston Dynamo	Re-Entry Draft Stage One
December 16, 2016	(United States) Patrick McLain	Chicago Fire	Orlando City SC	Re-Entry Draft Stage One
December 16, 2016	(United States) Bryan Meredith	San Jose Earthquakes	Seattle Sounders FC	Re-Entry Draft Stage One
December 16, 2016	(El Salvador) Junior Burgos	Atlanta United FC	Unattached	Waived
December 19, 2016	(United States) Spencer Richey	(Canada) Whitecaps FC 2	Vancouver Whitecaps FC	Free
December 19, 2016	(United States) Kyle Greig	(Canada) Whitecaps FC 2	Vancouver Whitecaps FC	Free
December 20, 2016	(United States) Alex Crognale	(United States) Maryland Terrapins	Columbus Crew SC	Homegrown player
December 20, 2016	(United States) Jeff Attinella	Minnesota United FC	Portland Timbers	Trade
December 20, 2016	(Costa Rica) José Guillermo Ortiz	(Costa Rica) Herediano	D.C. United	Loan
December 20, 2016	(Honduras) Alberth Elis	(Mexico) Monterrey	Houston Dynamo	Loan
December 20, 2016	(Hungary) Nemanja Nikolić	(Poland) Legia Warsaw	Chicago Fire	Undisclosed
December 20, 2016	(United States) Taylor Washington	Philadelphia Union	(United States) Pittsburgh Riverhounds	Free
December 21, 2016	(United States) Jacob Peterson	Sporting Kansas City	Atlanta United FC	Free Agent
December 21, 2016	(Mexico) José Hernández	(United States) UCLA Bruins	Real Salt Lake	Homegrown player
December 21, 2016	(United States) Nick Lima	(United States) California Golden Bears	San Jose Earthquakes	Homegrown player
December 21, 2016	(Panama) Adolfo Machado	(Costa Rica) Saprissa	Houston Dynamo	Undisclosed
December 22, 2016	(Costa Rica) David Guzmán	(Costa Rica) Saprissa	Portland Timbers	Undisclosed
December 22, 2016	(Brazil) Leonardo	LA Galaxy	Houston Dynamo	Re-Entry Draft Stage Two
December 22, 2016	(United States) Josh Williams	Toronto FC	Columbus Crew SC	Re-Entry Draft Stage Two
December 22, 2016	(Colombia) Olmes García	Real Salt Lake	San Jose Earthquakes	Re-Entry Draft Stage Two
December 22, 2016	(United States) Andrew Dykstra	D.C. United	Sporting Kansas City	Re-Entry Draft Stage Two
December 22, 2016	(United States) Reggie Cannon	(United States) UCLA Bruins	FC Dallas	Homegrown player
December 22, 2016	(United States) Harry Shipp	Montreal Impact	Seattle Sounders FC	Trade
December 22, 2016	(United States) Matt Van Oekel	(Canada) FC Edmonton	Real Salt Lake	Undisclosed
December 23, 2016	(Brazil) Igor Julião	(Brazil) Fluminense	Sporting Kansas City	Loan
December 23, 2016	(United States) Will Bruin	Houston Dynamo	Seattle Sounders FC	Trade
December 23, 2016	(Honduras) Romell Quioto	(Honduras) Olimpia	Houston Dynamo	Undisclosed
December 23, 2016	(Finland) Jukka Raitala	(Norway) Sogndal	Columbus Crew SC	Discovery signing
December 23, 2016	(United States) Greg Garza	(Mexico) Tijuana	Atlanta United FC	Loan
December 23, 2016	(Brazil) Juninho	(Mexico) Tijuana	Chicago Fire	Loan
December 27, 2016	(Argentina) Javier Morales	Real Salt Lake	FC Dallas	Free Agent
December 27, 2016	(Costa Rica) Francisco Calvo	(Costa Rica) Saprissa	Minnesota United FC	Undisclosed
December 27, 2016	(Democratic Republic of the Congo) Cedrick Mabwati	Columbus Crew SC	(Spain) UCAM Murcia	Free
December 28, 2016	(Canada) Will Johnson	Toronto FC	Orlando City SC	Free Agent
December 30, 2016	(Colombia) Juan David Cabezas	(Colombia) Deportivo Cali	Houston Dynamo	Loan
December 30, 2016	(Japan) Masato Kudo	Vancouver Whitecaps FC	(Japan) Sanfrecce Hiroshima	Free
December 31, 2016	(Guinea-Bissau) Sambinha	New England Revolution	(Portugal) Sporting B	Loan Return
December 31, 2016	(United States) Erik Palmer-Brown	(Portugal) Porto B	Sporting Kansas City	Loan Return
January 1, 2017	(Switzerland) Tranquillo Barnetta	Philadelphia Union	(Switzerland) St. Gallen	Free
January 3, 2017	(Ghana) Jonathan Mensah	(Russia) Anzhi Makhachkala	Columbus Crew SC	Undisclosed
January 3, 2017	(United States) Collin Martin	D.C. United	Minnesota United FC	Trade
January 4, 2017	(Guinea-Bissau) Gerso Fernandes	(Portugal) Belenenses	Sporting Kansas City	Undisclosed
January 4, 2017	(Brazil) Victor Giro	(United States) Tampa Bay Rowdies	Orlando City SC	Undisclosed
January 4, 2017	(Costa Rica) Roy Miller	(Costa Rica) Saprissa	Portland Timbers	Undisclosed
January 5, 2017	(United States) Christian Ramirez	(United States) Minnesota United (NASL)	Minnesota United FC	Free
January 5, 2017	(United States) Miguel Ibarra	(Mexico) León	Minnesota United FC	Undisclosed
January 5, 2017	(Netherlands) Giliano Wijnaldum	(Germany) VfL Bochum	Philadelphia Union	Undisclosed
January 6, 2017	(United States) Kortne Ford	(United States) Denver Pioneers	Colorado Rapids	Homegrown player
January 6, 2017	(Mexico) Ricardo Perez	(United States) Creighton Bluejays	Colorado Rapids	Homegrown player
January 6, 2017	(Colombia) Fabián Castillo	FC Dallas	(Turkey) Trabzonspor	Undisclosed
January 6, 2017	(Slovakia) Albert Rusnák	(Netherlands) Groningen	Real Salt Lake	Undisclosed
January 7, 2017	(Uruguay) Jorge Bava	(Colombia) Atlético Bucaramanga	Chicago Fire	Discovery signing
January 7, 2017	(Panama) Harold Cummings	(Costa Rica) Alajuelense	San Jose Earthquakes	Undisclosed
January 9, 2017	(Ghana) Latif Blessing	(Ghana) Liberty Professionals	Sporting Kansas City	Discovery signing
January 9, 2017	(United States) Christian Volesky	Portland Timbers	Sporting Kansas City	Trade
January 9, 2017	(England) Jay Simpson	(England) Leyton Orient	Philadelphia Union	Discovery signing
January 10, 2017	(United States) Cameron Iwasa	(United States) Sacramento Republic	Sporting Kansas City	Free
January 10, 2017	(Norway) Vadim Demidov	(Norway) Brann	Minnesota United FC	Undisclosed
January 10, 2017	(Colombia) Jefferson Mena	New York City	(Ecuador) Barcelona	Loan
January 10, 2017	(Costa Rica) Álvaro Saborío	D.C. United	(Costa Rica) Saprissa	Free
January 11, 2017	(Panama) Miguel Camargo	(Panama) Chorrillo	New York City	Loan
January 11, 2017	(Argentina) Yamil Asad	(Argentina) Vélez Sarsfield	Atlanta United FC	Loan
January 11, 2017	(Canada) Sergio Camargo	(United States) Syracuse Orange	Toronto FC	Homegrown player
January 12, 2017	(Colombia) Victor Arboleda	(United States) Portland Timbers 2	Portland Timbers	Free
January 12, 2017	(Jamaica) Rennico Clarke	(United States) Portland Timbers 2	Portland Timbers	Free
January 12, 2017	(United States) Kendall McIntosh	(United States) Portland Timbers 2	Portland Timbers	Free
January 13, 2017	(Spain) Ilie Sánchez	(Germany) 1860 Munich	Sporting Kansas City	Free
January 13. 2017	(United States) Hugo Arellano	(United States) LA Galaxy II	LA Galaxy	Homegrown player
January 13, 2017	(Guam) A. J. DeLaGarza	LA Galaxy	Houston Dynamo	Trade
January 15, 2017	(Ghana) Gershon Koffie	New England Revolution	(Sweden) Hammarby	Free
January 16, 2017	(United States) Dax McCarty	New York Red Bulls	Chicago Fire	Trade
January 16, 2017	(Chile) Pedro Morales	Vancouver Whitecaps FC	(Chile) Colo-Colo	Free
January 17, 2017	(Canada) Karl Ouimette	New York Red Bulls	(United States) San Francisco Deltas	Free
January 18, 2017	(United States) Seyi Adekoya	(United States) UCLA Bruins	Seattle Sounders FC	Homegrown player
January 18, 2017	(United States) Henry Wingo	(United States) Washington Huskies	Seattle Sounders FC	Homegrown player
January 19, 2017	(Portugal) João Pedro	(Portugal) Vitória de Guimarães	LA Galaxy	Discovery signing
January 20, 2017	(Honduras) José Escalante	(Honduras) Olimpia	Houston Dynamo	Loan
January 20, 2017	(United States) Pierre da Silva	(United States) Orlando City B	Orlando City SC	Free
January 20, 2017	(Guatemala) Marco Pappa	Colorado Rapids	(Guatemala) Municipal	Free
January 23, 2017	(United States) Ian Harkes	(United States) Wake Forest Demon Deacons	D.C. United	Homegrown player
January 23, 2017	(United States) Alan Gordon	LA Galaxy	Colorado Rapids	Free Agent
January 23, 2017	(Peru) Yordy Reyna	(Austria) Red Bull Salzburg	Vancouver Whitecaps FC	Undisclosed
January 23, 2017	(United States) Chance Myers	Sporting Kansas City	Portland Timbers	Free Agent
January 23, 2017	(Colombia) Dairon Asprilla	(Colombia) Millonarios	Portland Timbers	Loan Return
January 23, 2017	(Brazil) Ibson	(United States) Minnesota United (NASL)	Minnesota United FC	Free
January 23, 2017	(United States) Brent Kallman	(United States) Minnesota United (NASL)	Minnesota United FC	
January 23, 2017	(United States) Evan Louro	(United States) Michigan Wolverines	New York Red Bulls	Homegrown player
January 23, 2017	(United States) Dan Metzger	(United States) New York Red Bulls II	New York Red Bulls	Free
January 24, 2017	(Ghana) Mohammed Abu	(Norway) Strømsgodset	Columbus Crew SC	Discovery signing
January 24, 2017	(Dominican Republic) Rafael Díaz	(United States) New York Red Bulls II	New York Red Bulls	Free
January 24, 2017	(Uruguay) Vicente Sánchez	(Uruguay) Defensor Sporting	Houston Dynamo	Free
January 24, 2017	(United States) Jonathan Spector	(England) Birmingham City	Orlando City SC	Free
January 24, 2017	(Finland) Rasmus Schüller	(Sweden) Häcken	Minnesota United FC	Undisclosed
January 24, 2017	(Jamaica) Jermaine Taylor	Portland Timbers	Minnesota United FC	Undisclosed
January 24, 2017	(Venezuela) Bernardo Añor	Sporting Kansas City	Minnesota United FC	Unidslcosed
January 24, 2017	(Ghana) Bismark Adjei-Boateng	(England) Manchester City	Colorado Rapids	Undisclosed
January 24, 2017	(England) Tyrone Mears	Seattle Sounders FC	Atlanta United FC	Trade
January 24, 2017	(France) Sébastien Le Toux	Colorado Rapids	D.C. United	Free Agent
January 24, 2017	(United States) Arun Basuljevic	(United States) Georgetown Hoyas	New York Red Bulls	Homegrown player
January 25, 2017	(Slovenia) Antonio Delamea Mlinar	(Slovenia) Olimpija Ljubljana	New England Revolution	Undisclosed
January 25, 2017	(United States) Abuchi Obinwa	(Germany) Hannover 96	Columbus Crew SC	Free
January 25, 2017	(Panama) Cristian Martínez	(Panama) Chorrillo	Columbus Crew SC	Undisclosed
January 26, 2017	(England) Anton Walkes	(England) Tottenham Hotspur	Atlanta United FC	Loan
January 26, 2017	(United States) Chad Barrett	San Jose Earthquakes	Real Salt Lake	Free Agent
January 26, 2017	(United States) David Horst	Houston Dynamo	Real Salt Lake	Free Agent
January 26, 2017	(Paraguay) Cristian Colmán	(Paraguay) Nacional Asunción	FC Dallas	Undisclosed
January 26, 2017	(Cameroon) Nouhou Tolo	(United States) Seattle Sounders FC 2	Seattle Sounders FC	Free
January 26, 2017	(Argentina) Leandro González Pírez	(Argentina) Estudiantes	Atlanta United FC	Undisclosed
January 26, 2017	(Trinidad and Tobago) Kevin Molino	Orlando City SC	Minnesota United FC	Trade
January 26, 2017	(United States) Patrick McLain	Orlando City SC	Minnesota United FC	Trade
January 27, 2017	(United States) Djordje Mihailovic	(United States) Chicago Fire Academy	Chicago Fire	Homegrown player
January 27, 2017	(United States) Josh Saunders	New York City	Orlando City SC	Trade
January 27, 2017	(Costa Rica) Marco Ureña	(Denmark) Brøndby	San Jose Earthquakes	Undisclosed
January 27, 2017	(Ivory Coast) Benjamin Angoua	(France) Guingamp	New England Revolution	Undisclosed
January 27, 2017	(Peru) Alexander Callens	(Spain) Numancia	New York City	Undisclosed
January 29, 2017	(Sweden) John Alvbåge	(Sweden) IFK Göteborg	Minnesota United FC	Loan
January 30, 2017	(United States) Oguchi Onyewu	Unattached	Philadelphia Union	Free Agent
January 31, 2017	(France) Romain Alessandrini	(France) Marseille	LA Galaxy	Undisclosed
January 31, 2017	(Democratic Republic of the Congo) Chris Mavinga	(Russia) Rubin Kazan	Toronto FC	Undisclosed
January 31, 2017	(Bosnia and Herzegovina) Haris Medunjanin	(Israel) Maccabi Tel Aviv	Philadelphia Union	Undisclosed
January 31, 2017	(Sweden) Gustav Svensson	(China) Guangzhou R&F	Seattle Sounders FC	Undisclosed
January 31, 2017	(Cameroon) Hassan Ndam	(Cameroon) Rainbow FC	New York Red Bulls	Undisclosed
February 1, 2017	(Finland) Alexander Ring	(Germany) 1. FC Kaiserslautern	New York City	Undisclosed
February 1, 2017	(Canada) Kianz Froese	Vancouver Whitecaps FC	(Germany) Fortuna Düsseldorf	Undisclosed
February 2, 2017	(United States) Fafà Picault	(Germany) St. Pauli	Philadelphia Union	Undisclosed
February 2, 2017	(Venezuela) Josef Martínez	(Italy) Torino	Atlanta United FC	Loan
February 2, 2017	(Netherlands) Danny Hoesen	(Netherlands) Groningen	San Jose Earthquakes	Loan
February 2, 2017	(Germany) Florian Jungwirth	(Germany) SV Darmstadt 98	San Jose Earthquakes	Undisclosed
February 2, 2017	(Argentina) Sebastián Blanco	(Argentina) San Lorenzo	Portland Timbers	Undisclosed
February 3, 2017	(Kenya) Lawrence Olum	Sporting Kansas City	Portland Timbers	Trade
February 3, 2017	(Albania) Jahmir Hyka	(Switzerland) Luzern	San Jose Earthquakes	Undisclosed
February 6, 2017	(United States) Brooks Lennon	(England) Liverpool	Real Salt Lake	Loan
February 6, 2017	(Chile) Carlos Carmona	(Italy) Atalanta	Atlanta United FC	Discovery Signing
February 7, 2017	(Argentina) Hernán Grana	(Argentina) All Boys	FC Dallas	Loan
February 7, 2017	(Venezuela) Carlos Cermeño	(Venezuela) Deportivo Táchira	FC Dallas	Loan
February 8, 2017	(Denmark) Bashkim Kadrii	(Denmark) F.C. Copenhagen	Minnesota United FC	Loan
February 8, 2017	(United States) Adam Najem	New York Red Bulls	Philadelphia Union	Trade
February 13, 2017	(Brazil) Artur	(Brazil) São Paulo	Columbus Crew SC	Loan
February 14, 2017	(Venezuela) Yangel Herrera	(England) Manchester City	New York City	Loan
February 15, 2017	(United States) Josh Gatt	Unattached	Minnesota United FC	Free Agent
February 15, 2017	(Argentina) Maxi Moralez	(Mexico) León	New York City	Undisclosed
February 15, 2017	(Colombia) Fredy Montero	(China) Tianjin TEDA	Vancouver Whitecaps FC	Loan
February 15, 2017	(Costa Rica) Rodney Wallace	(Brazil) Sport Recife	New York City	Free
February 15, 2017	(United States) Bobby Shuttleworth	New England Revolution	Minnesota United FC	Trade
February 15, 2017	(Benin) Femi Hollinger-Janzen	Minnesota United FC	New England Revolution	Trade
February 16, 2017	(United States) John Stertzer	Unattached	New York City	Free Agent
February 18, 2017	(Panama) Michael Amir Murillo	(Panama) San Francisco F.C.	New York Red Bulls	Loan
February 20, 2017	(Spain) Víctor Vázquez	(Mexico) Cruz Azul	Toronto FC	Undisclosed
February 21, 2017	(Switzerland) Jérôme Thiesson	(Switzerland) Luzern	Minnesota United FC	Undisclosed
February 22, 2017	(Argentina) Adrián Arregui	(Argentina) Temperley	Montreal Impact	Loan
February 23, 2017	(United States) Ben Sweat	Unattached	New York City	Free Agent
February 24, 2017	(Canada) Maxim Tissot	Unattached	D.C. United	Free Agent
February 25, 2017	(United States) Brek Shea	Orlando City SC	Vancouver Whitecaps FC	Trade
February 25, 2017	(Jamaica) Giles Barnes	Vancouver Whitecaps FC	Orlando City SC	Trade
February 27, 2017	(Argentina) Mauro Rosales	FC Dallas	Vancouver Whitecaps FC	Free
March 1, 2017	(United States) Jack McInerney	Portland Timbers	Unattached	Waived
March 1, 2017	(United States) Kyle Reynish	New York Red Bulls	Atlanta United FC	Trade
March 2, 2017	(Ghana) Jeffrey Otoo	Atlanta United FC	(United States) Charleston Battery	Loan
March 2, 2017	(Jamaica) Romario Williams	Atlanta United FC	(United States) Charleston Battery	Loan
March 3, 2017	(Switzerland) Scott Sutter	(Switzerland) Young Boys	Orlando City SC	Undisclosed
March 3, 2017	(Senegal) Moussa Sane	(Senegal) AS Dakar Sacré Coeur	Orlando City SC	Loan
March 10, 2017	(Norway) Fredrik Gulbrandsen	(Austria) Red Bull Salzburg	New York Red Bulls	Loan
March 10, 2017	(United States) Mix Diskerud	New York City	(Sweden) IFK Göteborg	Loan
March 10, 2017	(United States) Jake McGuire	Unattached	Philadelphia Union	Free
March 11, 2017	(Finland) Johan Brunell	(Finland) FF Jaro	Toronto FC	Undisclosed
March 18, 2017	(Honduras) Bryan Róchez	Unattached	Atlanta United FC	Free
March 21, 2017	(Germany) Bastian Schweinsteiger	(England) Manchester United	Chicago Fire	Undisclosed
March 21, 2017	(Puerto Rico) Jason Hernandez	New York City	Toronto FC	Free
March 30, 2017	(The Gambia) Kekuta Manneh	Vancouver Whitecaps FC	Columbus Crew SC	Trade
March 30, 2017	(Cameroon) Tony Tchani	Columbus Crew SC	Vancouver Whitecaps FC	Trade
March 31, 2017	(United States) Josh Gatt	Minnesota United FC	Colorado Rapids	Trade
March 31, 2017	(Sweden) Mohammed Saeid	Minnesota United FC	Colorado Rapids	Trade
March 31, 2017	(United States) Sam Cronin	Colorado Rapids	Minnesota United FC	Trade
March 31, 2017	(United States) Marc Burch	Colorado Rapids	Minnesota United FC	Trade
April 4, 2017	(Cameroon) Anatole Abang	New York Red Bulls	(Finland) SJK	Loan
April 4, 2017	(Cameroon) Eric Ayuk	Philadelphia Union	(Sweden) Jönköpings Södra IF	Loan
April 6, 2017	(United States) Luis Gil	(Mexico) Querétaro	Orlando City SC	Loan
April 6, 2017	(Finland) Johan Brunell	Toronto FC	Unattached	Waived
April 18, 2017	(United States) Jack McInerney	Unattached	LA Galaxy	Free
April 21, 2017	(Canada) Molham Babouli	Toronto FC	Unattached	Waived
May 2, 2017	(United States) Ben Spencer	Toronto FC II	Toronto FC	Transfer
May 8, 2017	(Ghana) Gershon Koffie	(Sweden) Hammarby Fotboll	New England Revolution	Loan
May 9, 2017	(Venezuela) Jefferson Savarino	(Venezuela) Zulia	Real Salt Lake	Loan
May 9, 2017	(Australia) Bernie Ibini-Isei	(Belgium) Club Brugge	Vancouver Whitecaps FC	Transfer
May 12, 2017	(Ecuador) Aníbal Chalá	FC Dallas	(Ecuador) L.D.U. Quito	Loan
May 31, 2017	(Bosnia and Herzegovina) Amer Didic	(United States) Swope Park Rangers	Sporting Kansas City	Transfer
June 6, 2017	(Norway) Fredrik Gulbrandsen	New York Red Bulls	(Austria) Red Bull Salzburg	Loan Terminated
June 9, 2017	(Spain) Agus	Houston Dynamo	Unattached	Waived
June 15, 2017	(Uruguay) Álvaro Fernández	Seattle Sounders FC	Unattached	Released
June 16, 2017	(Argentina) Adrián Arregui	Montreal Impact	(Argentina) Temperley	Loan Terminated
June 20, 2017	(Jamaica) Deshorn Brown	(United States) Tampa Bay Rowdies	D.C. United	Trade
June 21, 2017	(United States) James Sands	(United States) New York City FC Academy	New York City	Homegrown player
June 22, 2017	(Georgia (country)) Valeri Qazaishvili	(Netherlands) Vitesse	San Jose Earthquakes	Free
June 24, 2017	(Sierra Leone) Alhaji Kamara	D.C. United	(Saudi Arabia) Al-Taawoun	Transfer
June 26, 2017	(Democratic Republic of the Congo) Larrys Mabiala	(Turkey) Kayserispor	Portland Timbers	Transfer
June 28, 2017	(United States) Justin Bilyeu	New York Red Bulls	Unattached	Waived
June 28, 2017	(Argentina) Matías Pérez García	Orlando City SC	Unattached	Waived
June 29, 2017	(Brazil) Igor Julião	Sporting Kansas City	(Brazil) Fluminense	Loan Terminated
June 29, 2017	(Spain) Cristian Lobato	(Spain) Gimnàstic de Tarragona	Sporting Kansas City	Undisclosed
July 1, 2017	(Netherlands) Kelvin Leerdam	(Netherlands) Vitesse	Seattle Sounders FC	Free
July 3, 2017	(Uruguay) Marcelo Silva	(Spain) Real Zaragoza	Real Salt Lake	Transfer
July 10, 2017	(Scotland) Sam Nicholson	(Scotland) Heart of Midlothian	Minnesota United FC	Undisclosed
July 10, 2017	(United States) Brad Guzan	(England) Middlesbrough F.C.	Atlanta United FC	Free
July 11, 2017	(Netherlands) Pele van Anholt	(Netherlands) Willem II	LA Galaxy	Free
July 11, 2017	(United States) Dilly Duka	Columbus Crew SC	Unattached	Waived
July 12, 2017	(New Zealand) Michael Boxall	(South Africa) SuperSport United	Minnesota United FC	Transfer
July 12, 2017	(Costa Rica) José Guillermo Ortiz	D.C. United	(Costa Rica) Herediano	Loan Terminated
July 13, 2017	(Liechtenstein) Nicolas Hasler	(Switzerland) Vaduz	Toronto FC	Transfer
July 13, 2017	(Jamaica) Shaun Francis	San Jose Earthquakes	Montreal Impact	Trade
July 14, 2017	(United States) Patrick Doody	Chicago Fire	(United States) Saint Louis FC	Loan
July 15, 2017	(United States) Brandon Allen	New York Red Bulls	Minnesota United FC	Loan
July 17, 2017	(Argentina) Tomás Martínez	(Portugal) Braga	Houston Dynamo	Transfer
July 18, 2017	(Italy) Paolo Tornaghi	Vancouver Whitecaps FC	Unattached	Released
July 19, 2017	(New Zealand) Stefan Marinovic	(Germany) SpVgg Unterhaching	Vancouver Whitecaps FC	Transfer
July 20, 2017	(Romania) Deian Boldor	(Italy) Bologna	Montreal Impact	Loan
July 21, 2017	(Switzerland) François Affolter	(Switzerland) Luzern	San Jose Earthquakes	Transfer
July 25, 2017	(United States) Dom Dwyer	Sporting Kansas City	Orlando City SC	Trade
July 25, 2017	(Canada) Sam Adekugbe	Vancouver Whitecaps FC	(Sweden) IFK Göteborg	Loan
July 26, 2017	(New Zealand) Bill Tuiloma	(France) Marseille	Portland Timbers	Transfer
July 26, 2017	(Germany) Stefan Aigner	(Germany) 1860 Munich	Colorado Rapids	Transfer
July 27, 2017	(Panama) Fidel Escobar	(Panama) Sporting San Miguelito	New York Red Bulls	Loan
July 28, 2017	(Norway) Muhamed Keita	(Poland) Lech Poznań	New York Red Bulls	Transfer
July 28, 2017	(Mexico) Jonathan dos Santos	(Spain) Villarreal	LA Galaxy	Transfer
July 28, 2017	(France) Claude Dielna	(England) Sheffield Wednesday	New England Revolution	Transfer
August 1, 2017	(United States) Fatai Alashe	San Jose Earthquakes	(United States) Reno 1868 FC	Loan
August 2, 2017	(Spain) Víctor Rodríguez	(Spain) Sporting de Gijón	Seattle Sounders FC	Transfer
August 3, 2017	(Canada) Samuel Piette	(Spain) CD Izarra	Montreal Impact	Transfer
August 4, 2017	(Peru) Yoshimar Yotún	(Sweden) Malmö	Orlando City SC	Transfer
August 4, 2017	(Bolivia) Bruno Miranda	Universidad de Chile	D.C. United	Loan
August 7, 2017	(United States) Lamar Neagle	D.C. United	Seattle Sounders FC	Trade
August 7, 2017	(Switzerland) Philippe Senderos	(Scotland) Rangers F.C.	Houston Dynamo	Transfer
August 8, 2017	(Portugal) Pedro Santos	(Portugal) Braga	Columbus Crew SC	Transfer
August 8, 2017	(United States) Bobby Boswell	D.C. United	Atlanta United FC	Trade
August 8, 2017	(United States) Alex Kapp	Unattached	Minnesota United FC	Free
August 9, 2017	(United States) Ethan Finlay	Columbus Crew SC	Minnesota United FC	Trade
August 9, 2017	(United States) Russell Canouse	(Germany) TSG 1899 Hoffenheim	D.C. United	Transfer
August 9, 2017	(United States) Aaron Maund	Real Salt Lake	Vancouver Whitecaps FC	Trade
August 9, 2017	(United States) Christian Dean	Vancouver Whitecaps FC	Chicago Fire	Trade
August 9, 2017	(Venezuela) Luis González	(Venezuela) Monagas	FC Dallas	Loan
August 9, 2017	(Finland) Rasmus Schüller	Minnesota United FC	(Finland) HJK	Loan
August 9, 2017	(Cameroon) Anatole Abang	New York Red Bulls	(Romania) Astra Giurgiu	Loan
August 9, 2017	(Hungary) Zoltán Stieber	(Germany) 1. FC Kaiserslautern	D.C. United	Transfer
August 10, 2017	(United States) Paul Arriola	(Mexico) Tijuana	D.C. United	Transfer
August 10, 2017	(Costa Rica) José Leitón	(Costa Rica) Herediano	Minnesota United FC	Loan
August 10, 2017	(Egypt) Ali Ghazal	(China) Guizhou Zhicheng	Vancouver Whitecaps FC	Transfer
August 10, 2017	(Scotland) Calum Mallace	Montreal Impact	Seattle Sounders FC	Trade
August 10, 2017	(United States) Luis Gil	Orlando City SC	Colorado Rapids	Trade
August 10, 2017	(United States) Dillon Powers	Colorado Rapids	Orlando City SC	Trade
August 10, 2017	(Hungary) Krisztián Németh	Columbus Crew SC	New England Revolution	Trade
August 11, 2017	(United States) Victor Mansaray	Seattle Sounders FC	Unattached	Waived
August 11, 2017	(Mexico) Richard Sánchez	Unattached	Chicago Fire	Allocation
August 14, 2017	(Germany) Julian Büscher	D.C. United	(United States) Rochester Rhinos	Loan
August 17, 2017	(United States) Steve Clark	(Denmark) AC Horsens	D.C. United	Free
August 17, 2017	(France) Sébastien Le Toux	D.C. United	Unattached	Released
August 18, 2017	(Belgium) Jelle Van Damme	LA Galaxy	(Belgium) Royal Antwerp	Transfer
August 22, 2017	(Honduras) Bryan Róchez	Atlanta United FC	Unattached	Waived
August 24, 2017	(Argentina) Juan Edgardo Ramírez	Colorado Rapids	Unattached	Released
August 25, 2017	(United States) Gianluca Busio	(United States) Sporting Kansas City Academy	Sporting Kansas City	Homegrown player
September 14, 2017	(Cuba) Jorge Corrales	(United States) Tulsa Roughnecks FC	Chicago Fire	Transfer
September 14, 2017	(Cuba) Jorge Corrales	Chicago Fire	(United States) Tulsa Roughnecks FC	Loan
