= Wimilio Vink =

Dutch footballer (born 1993)

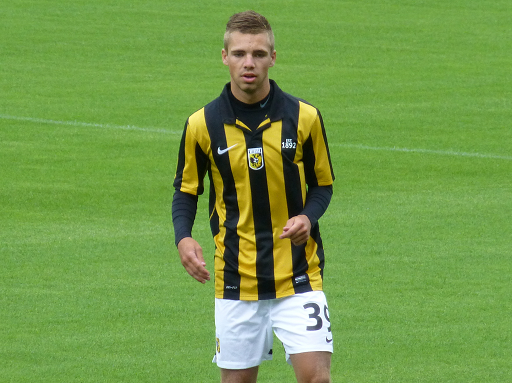
- Vink training with Vitesse

Personal information
- Date of birth: 13 September 1993 (age 33)
- Place of birth: Tiel, Netherlands
- Height: 1.73 m (5 ft 8 in)
- Position: Attacking midfielder

Team information
- Current team: GVVV

Youth career
- VV Kesteren
- SV DFS
- 2003–2005: NEC
- 2005–2011: Vitesse

Senior career*
Years	Team	Apps	(Gls)
2011–2014	Vitesse	1	(0)
2014–2015	MVV	21	(1)
2015–2016	Eindhoven	22	(0)
2016–2020	TEC	120	(34)
2020–2025	Spakenburg	137	(19)
2025–	GVVV	10	(1)

International career
2013	Netherlands U20	3	(0)
- * Club domestic league appearances and goals as of 21:11, 20 October 2025 (UTC)

Wimilio Vink (born 13 September 1993) is a Dutch footballer who plays as an attacking midfielder for Tweede Divisie club GVVV.

== Career ==
Vink finished his youth career at Vitesse, after a spell with NEC.

On 26 August 2011, Vink made his professional debut, in a 4–1 away defeat against Ajax. On 17 November, he signed a professional contract with Vitesse, until 2014. After he was released in July 2014, Vink signed with Eerste Divisie side MVV Maastricht.

== Personal life ==
Vink's father, Gery Vink, is a youth manager at Ajax.
