= Anderson López =

Dutch footballer (born 1999)

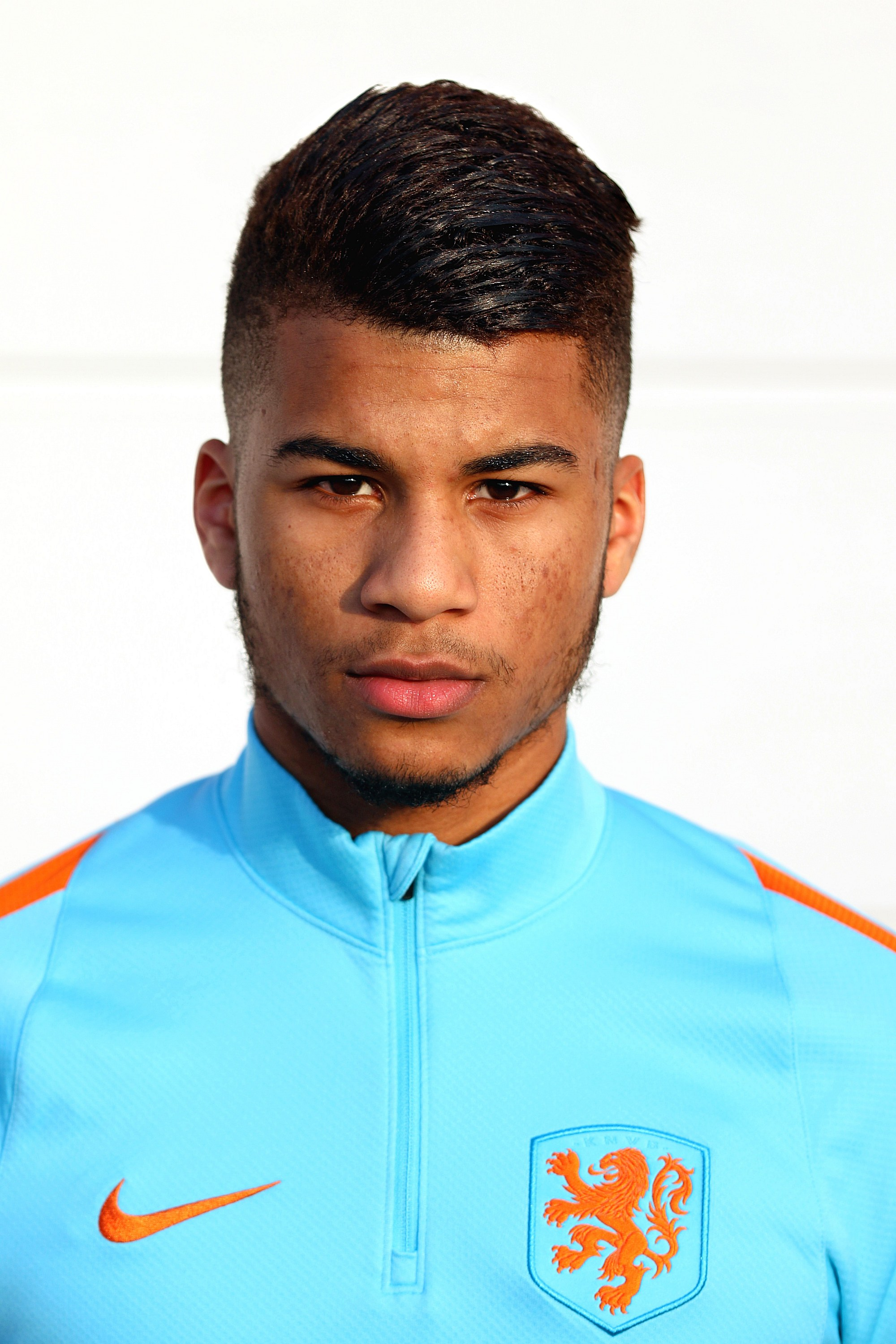
- López with Netherlands U18 in 2017

Personal information
- Full name: Anderson Mateo López
- Date of birth: 25 January 1999 (age 27)
- Place of birth: Renkum, Netherlands
- Height: 1.75 m (5 ft 9 in)
- Position: Forward

Team information
- Current team: Scherpenzeel
- Number: 14

Youth career
- RVW
- 2011–2013: Vitesse
- 2013–2017: AFC Ajax

Senior career*
Years	Team	Apps	(Gls)
2017–2020	Monaco	0	(0)
2017–2019	→ Cercle Brugge (loan)	1	(0)
2020–2021	Jong NEC	2	(0)
2023	GVVV	6	(0)
2023–2025	TEC	60	(7)
2025–	Scherpenzeel	8	(2)

International career
2013–2014	Netherlands U15	4	(2)
2015	Netherlands U16	2	(0)
2015–2016	Netherlands U17	8	(4)
2017	Netherlands U18	2	(0)
- * Club domestic league appearances and goals as of 16:20, 19 October 2025 (UTC)

Anderson Mateo López (born 25 January 1999) is a Dutch footballer who plays as a forward for Derde Divisie club Scherpenzeel.

== Club career ==
A youth product of the Ajax academy, López signed for Monaco and was immediately loaned to Cercle Brugge while recovering from knee surgery. He made his professional debut on 26 December 2018 in a 1–0 First Division A defeat to Eupen.

In 2020, López joined NEC as a free agent and was assigned to the club's under-21 side. After leaving NEC in 2021, he was without a club for almost two years before signing for GVVV of the Derde Divisie in March 2023. He moved to TEC in September 2023, and spent two seasons with the Tiel club before joining Scherpenzeel in April 2025 following their promotion to the same division.

== International career ==
López was born in the Netherlands and is of Dominican descent. He is a youth international for the Netherlands at various youth levels.

== Personal life ==
Alongside his playing career, López has worked in healthcare. He has spoken about progressing through the Ajax academy in the same age group as future Netherlands internationals Matthijs de Ligt, Donyell Malen, Noa Lang and Justin Kluivert, and about taking a different career path while playing in the Dutch fourth tier, the Derde Divisie.

== Honours ==
Monaco

- Ligue 1: 2016–17
