= David Arshakyan =

Armenian association football player

Personal information
- Full name: David Arshakyan
- Date of birth: 16 August 1994 (age 32)
- Place of birth: Saint Petersburg, Russia
- Height: 6 ft 4 in (1.93 m)
- Position: Forward

Youth career
- 2000–2006: Smena St. Petersburg
- 2006: Lokomotiv St. Petersburg
- 2006–2009: Smena St. Petersburg
- 2009–2010: Zenit-84 St. Petersburg
- 2010–2012: Lokomotiv St. Petersburg

Senior career*
Years	Team	Apps	(Gls)
2012–2013	Mika	3	(0)
2015–2016	Trakai	52	(34)
2016–2017	Chicago Fire	17	(0)
2018	Vejle BK	5	(0)
2018	Gorica	4	(0)
2019	Fakel Voronezh	8	(0)
2019	Rudeš	0	(0)
2019–2020	Ararat Yerevan	5	(1)
2020–2021	Irtysh Omsk	6	(1)
2022	FA Šiauliai	6	(0)
2022–2023	Van	0	(0)
2023	BKMA Yerevan	4	(0)
2024	Maxline Vitebsk	2	(1)

International career^{‡}
2012	Armenia U19	3	(0)
2016	Armenia U21	1	(0)
2016	Armenia	1	(0)
- * Club domestic league appearances and goals as of 10 December 2024 ‡ National team caps and goals as of 4 September 2016

David Arshakyan (Armenian: Դավիթ Արշակյան; born 16 August 1994) is an Armenian footballer. He also holds Russian citizenship as David Rudolfovich Arshakyan (Russian: Давид Рудольфович Аршакян).

== Club career ==
=== FC Mika ===
Arshakyan began his professional career with Armenian side FC Mika in 2012, and made three Armenian Premier League appearances as his side captured the 2012–13 Armenian Supercup.

=== FK Trakai ===
Arshakyan was transferred to Lithuanian side FK Trakai prior to the start of the 2015 season. In 34 A Lyga appearances, Arshakyan scored 25 goals and had six multi-goal games, including three hat-tricks, finishing the season just three goals shy of the top scorer in the league. That season, he also appeared in six UEFA Europa League qualifiers, scoring five goals in total.

Arshakyan made 18 appearances for Trakai in the 2016 season, scoring nine goals, including a hat-trick over FK Utenis Utena on July 28.

=== Chicago Fire ===
On August 3, 2016, the Chicago Fire announced that they had acquired Arshakyan from FK Trakai, on a two-year contract with club options for the third and fourth years. Arshakyan made his Chicago Fire debut on August 27, 2016, in a 6–2 defeat against D.C. United, when he replaced striker Michael de Leeuw in the 56th minute.

On December 18, 2017, Chicago and Arshakayan mutually agreed to terminate his contract.

=== Vejle Boldklub ===
On January 26, 2018, the Danish club Vejle Boldklub announced that they had signed Arshakyan on a free transfer. He signed a contract until the summer 2020.

=== Irtysh Omsk ===
On 23 September 2020, Arshakyan signed for Irtysh Omsk. On 31 March 2021, his contract with Irtysh was terminated by mutual consent.

== International career ==
As a youth player, Arshakyan represented Armenia at the U-19 and U-21 levels. In August 2016 Arshakyan was called up to the senior team ahead of its first match of 2018 FIFA World Cup qualification. On 4 September 2016 he debuted for the senior team, starting in Armenia's qualification match against Denmark.

== Career statistics ==
As of match played 10 December 2017

Appearances and goals by club, season and competition
Club	Season	League			National Cup		Continental		Other		Total	
Club	Season	Division	Apps	Goals	Apps	Goals	Apps	Goals	Apps	Goals	Apps	Goals
Mika	2014–15	Premier League	3	0	2	0	—		0	0	5	0
Trakai	2015	A Lyga	34	25	5	2	4 (Note: Appearances in the Europa League)	3	—		43	30
Trakai	2016	A Lyga	18	9	0	0	2	2	1 (Note: Appearance in the Lithuanian Supercup)	1	21	12
Trakai	Total		52	34	5	2	6	5	1	1	64	42
Chicago Fire	2016	MLS	9	0	0	0	—		—		9	0
Chicago Fire	2017	MLS	8	0	0	0	—		—		8	0
Chicago Fire	Total		17	0	0	0	0	0	0	0	17	0
Vejle	2017–18	1. Division	5	0	0	0	—		—		0	0
Career total			72	34	7	2	6	5	1	1	86	42
