= GVVV =

Dutch football club

- Full name: Gelders Veenendaalse Voetbal Vereniging
- Nickname: De Blauwen (the Blues)
- Founded: 15 November 1947; 78 years ago
- Ground: Sportpark Panhuis; Veenendaal
- Capacity: 4,500
- Chairman: Wilfried Bruijnzeels
- Manager: Gery Vink
- League: Tweede Divisie
- 2025–26: Tweede Divisie, 14th of 18
Home colours	Away colours

Gelders Veenendaalse Voetbal Vereniging, better known as GVVV, is a football club based in Veenendaal, Netherlands, that competes in the Tweede Divisie, the third tier of the Dutch football league system.

It is one of seven football clubs from Veenendaal. GVVV's colors are blue-white. GVVV plays its matches at Sportpark Panhuis. Since 2016, it plays in the Tweede Divisie.

== Current squad ==
As of 24 October 2026

Note: Flags indicate national team as defined under FIFA eligibility rules; some limited exceptions apply. Players may hold more than one non-FIFA nationality.

No.	Pos.	Nation	Player
1	GK	NED	Menno Heus
2	DF	NED	Tariq Dilrosun
3	DF	NED	Mitch Willems
4	DF	NED	Koen Hillen
5	DF	NED	Dennis Hillen
6	FW	NED	Arwin van Soest
7	FW	BOE	Shi-jon Martina
9	FW	NED	Bo van Essen
10	MF	NED	Quincy Veenhof
11	FW	NED	Nick Huls
16	GK	NED	Thom van der Oest

No.	Pos.	Nation	Player
17	FW	NED	Youri Roseboom
20	DF	NED	Joeri Potjes
21	MF	NED	Justin Spies
22	FW	NED	Morad El Haddouti
24	DF	NED	Fabio Helderton
25	MF	NED	Mart de Jong
27	MF	NED	Jayden Houtriet
29	MF	NED	Giel Slijkhuis
31	GK	UKR	Mykola Yaroshevych
34	MF	NED	Anis Yadir
43	MF	NED	Aaron Menelik

== Timeline ==
- 1948/1949 champions 3e klasse UPVB
- 1954/1955 champions 2e klasse UPVB
- 1957/1958 champions 1e klasse UPVB
- 1958/1959 champions 4e klasse KNVB
- 1959/1960 champions 3e klasse KNVB
- 1969/1970 promotion 2e to 1e klasse KNVB
- 1975/1976 relegation to 2e klasse
- 1979/1980 champions 2e klasse C KNVB
- 1984/1985 champions 1e klasse B KNVB
- 1996/1997 champions hoofdklasse A KNVB
- 2003/2004 relegation to 1e klasse KNVB
- 2004/2005 champions 1e klasse C KNVB
- 2005/2006 winners regional KNVB-cup (West I)
- 2010/2011 winners Hoofdklasse B
