= Morad El Haddouti =

Dutch footballer (born 1998)

Personal information
- Date of birth: 9 May 1998 (age 28)
- Place of birth: Nijmegen, Netherlands
- Height: 1.71 m (5 ft 7 in)
- Position: Right winger

Team information
- Current team: GVVV
- Number: 22

Youth career
- –2007: CSV Oranje Blauw
- 2007–2010: VV Union
- 2010–2014: NEC
- 2014–2015: De Graafschap
- 2015–2019: NEC

Senior career*
| Years | Team | Apps | (Gls) |
| 2019 | NEC | 2 | (0) |
| 2019–2021 | RKC | 6 | (0) |
| 2022–2023 | IJsselmeervogels | 28 | (7) |
| 2024 | De Treffers | 8 | (0) |
| 2024–2025 | Sparta Nijkerk | 12 | (1) |
| 2026– | GVVV | 1 | (0) |
- * Club domestic league appearances and goals as of 19:13, 24 October 2026 (UTC)

Morad El Haddouti (born 9 May 1998) is a Dutch footballer who plays as a winger for Tweede Divisie club GVVV.

== NEC ==
El Haddouti started playing football at CSV Oranje Blauw and VV Union and played in the youth academy of NEC between 2010 and 2014. In 2014–15 season, he played in the youth academy of the De Graafschap. In 2015 he rejoined NEC. He made his professional debut on 18 January 2019 against SC Telstar, the game ended in 1-1.

El Haddouti's contract with NEC was not extended and he left the club at the end of the 2019–20 season. He then joined RKC Waalwijk, where he was registered for the club reserve team. El Haddouti made his debut on 17 September 2019 for Jong RKC, where he came in to the second half and scored two goals. He made his first-team debut for the club on 13 September 2020 in a 0–1 home loss to Vitesse. He came on as an 82nd-minute substitute for Lennerd Daneels.

After spells at IJsselmeervogels and De Treffers, he joined fellow amateur side GVVV in summer 2026 after he left Sparta Nijkerk in 2025.
