= Menno Heus =

Dutch footballer (born 1995)

Personal information
- Date of birth: 17 December 1995 (age 30)
- Place of birth: Oosterhout, Netherlands
- Height: 1.88 m (6 ft 2 in)
- Position: Goalkeeper

Team information
- Current team: GVVV
- Number: 1

Youth career
- –2014: ASC Nieuwland
- 2004–2014: Utrecht

Senior career*
Years	Team	Apps	(Gls)
2014–2018	Jong Utrecht	31	(0)
2019	Den Bosch	0	(0)
2019–2020	Lienden	20	(0)
2020–2026	Spakenburg	47	(0)
2026–	GVVV	7	(0)
- * Club domestic league appearances and goals as of 116 October 2026

Menno Heus (born 17 December 1995) is a Dutch footballer who plays as a goalkeeper for Tweede Divisie club GVVV.

== Club career ==
Born in Oosterhout but raised in Amersfoort, Heus started playing football for local club ASC Nieuwland. He made his professional debut in the Eerste Divisie for Jong FC Utrecht on 26 August 2016 in a game against Jong PSV.

In the beginning of 2019, Heus joined FC Den Bosch on their training camp in Sevilla. His trial was successful and he officially signed for the club on 11 January 2019 for the rest of the season, as the third choice on the goalkeeper position. Ahead of the 2019–20 season, he joined FC Lienden.

On 17 December 2019, Heus signed with Spakenburg, joining the Tweede Divisie club from the start of the 2020–21 season.

On 28 January 2026, GVVV announced the signing of Heus on a one-year contract, with a club option for a further year, from the 2026–27 season.

== Honours ==
Spakenburg

- Tweede Divisie: 2023–24
