= Matej Deković =

Croatian footballer

Personal information
- Full name: Matej Deković
- Date of birth: 19 September 1993 (age 33)
- Place of birth: Zagreb, Croatia
- Height: 1.88 m (6 ft 2 in)
- Position: Left back

Team information
- Current team: Egersund
- Number: 4

Youth career
- –2011: Rudeš
- 2011–2012: Slaven

College career
Years	Team	Apps	(Gls)
2014–2016	Charlotte 49ers	57	(5)

Senior career*
Years	Team	Apps	(Gls)
2012–2014	HAŠK	16	(0)
2017	Chicago Fire	0	(0)
2017	→ Tulsa Roughnecks (loan)	6	(0)
2019–2020	Fløy	41	(2)
2021–	Egersund	26	(1)
- * Club domestic league appearances and goals as of 22:23, 15 November 2020 (UTC)

Matej Deković (born 19 September 1993) is a Croatian professional footballer who plays as a defender for Egersunds IK.

== Club career ==
Deković spent three years at the University of North Carolina at Charlotte following time with a handful of clubs in his native Croatia. On 17 January 2017, Deković was drafted in the fourth round (69th overall) of the 2017 MLS SuperDraft by Chicago Fire. He signed with the club on 27 February 2017.

On 20 March 2017, Deković signed on loan with United Soccer League side Tulsa Roughnecks. In 2019 he signed for Norwegian third-tier club Flekkerøy IL. On 8 December 2020, he signed a 2-years contract for Egersund
