= Pele van Anholt =

Dutch footballer (born 1991)

Personal information
- Full name: Kingsley Pele van Anholt
- Date of birth: 23 April 1991 (age 35)
- Place of birth: Sneek, Netherlands
- Height: 1.70 m (5 ft 7 in)
- Positions: Full-back; defensive midfielder

Team information
- Current team: TEC
- Number: 6

Youth career
- CAB Bolsward
- 2002–2009: Heerenveen

Senior career*
Years	Team	Apps	(Gls)
2009–2016	Heerenveen	127	(2)
2010–2011	→ Emmen (loan)	6	(0)
2016–2017	Willem II	23	(0)
2017	LA Galaxy	5	(0)
2018–2020	NAC	41	(1)
2020–2021	Enosis Neon Paralimni	13	(0)
2022	Roda JC	3	(0)
2023–	TEC	80	(3)
- * Club domestic league appearances and goals as of 18:13, 5 August 2025 (UTC)

Kingsley Pele van Anholt (born 23 April 1991) is a Dutch professional footballer who plays as a defensive midfielder or full back for Derde Divisie club TEC. Van Anholt is of Curaçaoan-Ghanaian descent.

== Club career ==
Van Anholt started his career with SC Heerenveen, where he played six seasons. He also formerly played on loan for FC Emmen.

Van Anholt signed with Major League Soccer club LA Galaxy on 12 July 2017. Pele played five games with LA Galaxy before tearing his MCL and ACL on 29 August 2017 in a 3–0 loss to San Jose Earthquakes. His 2018 contract option was declined by the LA Galaxy on 27 November 2017.
