= Youri Roseboom =

Dutch footballer

Personal information
- Date of birth: 19 January 2000 (age 26)
- Place of birth: Rheden, Netherlands
- Height: 1.87 m (6 ft 2 in)
- Position: Forward

Team information
- Current team: TEC

Youth career
- –2011: AVW'66
- 2011–2014: Vitesse
- 2014–2016: SWL Arnhem
- 2016–2017: NEC Nijmegen
- 2017–2018: Achilles '29
- 2018–2019: De Treffers

Senior career*
Years	Team	Apps	(Gls)
2018	Achilles '29	4	(0)
2019–2020	Eindhoven	5	(1)
2020	DOVO		
2021	Huragan Morąg	13	(5)
2021	KFC Diest		
2022–2024	MASV Arnhem		
2024	Silves		
2025–	TEC		
- * Club domestic league appearances and goals as of 11:50, 6 January 2025 (UTC)

Youri Roseboom (born 19 January 2000) is a Dutch footballer who plays as a forward for TEC.

== Career statistics ==
=== Club ===
As of 2 June 2020.

Club	Season	League			Cup		Continental		Other		Total	
Club	Season	Division	Apps	Goals	Apps	Goals	Apps	Goals	Apps	Goals	Apps	Goals
Achilles '29	2017–18	Tweede Divisie	4	0	0	0	–		0	0	4	0
Eindhoven	2019–20	Eerste Divisie	5	1	1 (Note: Appearances in the KNVB Cup)	0	–		0	0	6	1
Career total			9	1	1	0	0	0	0	0	10	1
