= Gery Vink =

Dutch football coach (born 1965)

Personal information
- Date of birth: 30 August 1965 (age 61)
- Place of birth: Opheusden, Netherlands

Team information
- Current team: GVVV Veenendaal - Head Coach

Managerial career
- Years: Team
- 2006–2010: Ajax (youth)
- 2011–2013: Jong Ajax
- 2013–2017: Ajax (youth)
- 2018–2021: Willem II (assistant)
- 2019–2020: TEC

Gery Vink (Born 30 August 1965) is a Dutch football coach.

== Career ==
Vink is the current head coach of the Ajax A2 selection of Dutch football club AFC Ajax. He was previously head coach of the reserves team Jong Ajax, having been coach of the A2 selection again once prior. Vink joined the ranks of Ajax in 2006, winning the A-Junioren Eerste Divisie on two occasions. 2008 and 2009. He became manager of Jong Ajax during the Winter break of the 2010–11 AFC Ajax season, and his contract was extended until 2014. In 2013 Vink has resumed the role as head coach of the A2 selection once more.

In 2014 Vink took over the Ajax A1 selection at the annual Copa Amsterdam, replacing the recently departed Orlando Trustfull at the tournament. Ajax finished in 6th place.

== Personal life ==
His son Wimilio Vink is a footballer.

== Honours ==
=== Manager ===
Ajax A2 (under-18)

- A-Junioren Eerste Divisie: 2007–08, 2008–09

Jong Ajax

- KNVB Reserve Cup: 2012
