= SV TEC =

Dutch football club

TEC
- Full name: Sportvereniging Tielse Eendracht Combinatie
- Founded: 1 June 1924; 101 years ago
- Ground: Sportpark De Lok, Tiel
- Capacity: 2,500
- Chairman: Johan Verweij
- Manager: Eric Meijers
- League: Derde Divisie
- 2024–25: Derde Divisie A, 11th of 18
- Website: https://www.svtec.nl/
Home colours

Sportvereniging Tielse Eendracht Combinatie, more commonly known as SV TEC or simply TEC (Dutch pronunciation: [ˌteːjeːˈseː]), is a football club based in Tiel, Gelderland. Formed on 1 June 1924, it plays in the Derde Divisie, the fourth tier of the Dutch football league system, and has spent most of its history in the lower amateur tiers. Its home ground is Sportpark De Lok.

== History ==
TEC was founded on 1 June 1924 as a merger of four clubs in Tiel, Gelderland. Initially, Amical, Hercules and Inter Amicos joined forces. Later Houdt Stand also participated in the merger which was called Tielse Eendracht Combinatie (TEC). Despite a difficult start, which saw economical difficulties, the club managed to reach promotion to the Tweede Klasse during the 1930s and another Tiel-based side, Velox, participated in the merger.

In the 1951–52 season, TEC finally won promotion to the Eerste Klasse after beating SC Emma. It would only last one season at that level, and the club subsequently suffered two successive relegations, ending up in the Derde Klasse.

The following decades mostly saw TEC bounce around between the Tweede and Derde Klasse, the second and third level of amateur football, respectively. In the season that TEC celebrated its 60th anniversary, they won promotion to the Tweede Klasse. The club played an anniversary match against Dutch champions Feyenoord in 1984. At home ground "De Lok", TEC faced players such as Sjaak Troost, Ivan Nielsen, Ben Wijnstekers, Ruud Gullit and Tiel native Simon Tahamata. More than 3,000 spectators watch their club lose 8–1 to Feyenoord. The second half of the 1980s was successful for TEC. Under manager and former player Henk van Tricht the club promoted to the Eerste Klasse for the first time in decades.

Between 2002 and 2004, TEC managed to compete in the Hoofdklasse, which was the highest amateur level at the time. From 2010, where the club played in the Derde Klasse again after successive relegations, they experienced a highly successful period under the leadership of head coach and former player Hanky Leatemia. Three championships and one play-off appearance later, TEC promoted to the Topklasse, which later became known as the Derde Divisie, the fourth tier in the Dutch football league system. Under the guidance of manager Frits van den Berk, TEC finished just behind FC Lienden to claim second place. This meant that promotion to the third-tier Tweede Divisie became a fact in 2016 – the highest ranking in club history. The performance occurred after the club board, sponsors and volunteers joined forces in 2010 to develop a five-year plan known as Project TEC, with the goal of propelling TEC to the top divisions. Gery Vink, former professional player at FC Wageningen and youth developer at Vitesse, PSV and Ajax, had been recruited to realise the plan which was finally achieved with the promotion.

=== 2019: Promotion to the Tweede Divisie ===
In the 2018–19 Derde Divisie, TEC finished 2nd and won promotion to the Tweede Divisie. TEC finished 15th in the 2022–23 Tweede Divisie, and were forced to participate in the relegation playoffs. They lost 6–1 on aggregate to SteDoCo in the first round, and were relegated to the Derde Divisie.

=== 2023–: Years in Derde Divisie ===
Following their relegation back to the Derde Divisie, TEC finished fourth in the 2023–24 Derde Divisie B, and qualified for the promotion playoffs. In the first round, TEC defeated SC Genemuiden 1–0 at home in the first leg, but lost 5–1 in the return leg, and lost 5–2 on aggregate.

== Current squad ==
As of 26 January 2025

Note: Flags indicate national team as defined under FIFA eligibility rules; some limited exceptions apply. Players may hold more than one non-FIFA nationality.

No.	Pos.	Nation	Player
1	GK	NED	Job Schuurman
3	DF	NED	Jeffrey Ket
4	DF	NED	Niall Raben
5	DF	NED	Guido van Rijn
6	MF	NED	Pele van Anholt (captain)
7	FW	NED	Bo van Essen
8	DF	NED	Quentin van Veenendaal
9	FW	NED	Anderson López
10	FW	CUW	Jarchinio Antonia
11	FW	NED	Fabian Serrarens
12	MF	NED	Walid Hassoun
14	FW	NED	Oğuzhan Yelkovan
16	MF	NED	Mohamed El Makrini
17	MF	NED	Redouan Hazzat
20	GK	NED	Dhanesh Ghiraw
21	MF	NED	Jayden Houtriet

No.	Pos.	Nation	Player
22	MF	NED	Hachim Lechkar
24	MF	SUR	Zyvairo Ritfeld
25	DF	NED	Marciano van Leijenhorst
26	MF	NED	Orlando Valadares Fonseca
28	DF	NED	Roshendrik Ortela
31	GK	NED	Joey Zwaan
—	GK	KOS	Rijad Bytyqi
—	MF	NED	Dominique van Zundert
—	MF	BEL	Jason Bourdouxhe
—	MF	NED	Awale Ismail-Mahamed
—	MF	NED	Dico Jap Tjong
—	FW	NED	Naoufal El Amrani
—	FW	NED	Youri Roseboom
—	FW	NED	Facinet van Gils
—	FW	NED	Sami Haouam

== Competition results 1926–2019 ==
1; 4C	2; 3D	1; 3D	4; 3D	6; 3D	2; 3C	4; 3C	1; 3C	3; 3C	3; 3E	1; 3E	1; 3C	1; 3C	8; 2B	3; M	6; 2C	8; 2C	7; 2C	4; 2C	-	6; 2C	7; 2C	1; 2C	3; 2C	2; 2C	2; 2B	1; 2B	14; 1D	11; 2A	3; 3D	7; 3D	7; 3D	5; 3D	9; 3D	9; 3D	4; 3D	5; 3D	3; 3D	3; 3D	1; 3D	6; 2A	11; 2A	7; 3D	5; 3D	7; 3D	10; 3D	7; 3D	6; 3D	2; 3D	1; 2A	11; 1D	7; 2A	12; 2A	2; 3D	5; 3D	2; 3D	5; 3D	5; 3D	1; 3D	9; 2A	4; 2A	5; 2A	8; 2A	6; 2A	1; 2A	6; 1D	10; 1D	4; 2A	3; 2A	5; 2A	11; 2A	1; 3C	4; 2F	2; 2F	3; 2F	2; 1C	3; 1C	6; B	14; A	5; 1C	11; 1C	2; 2F	11; 2F	4; 3C	3; 3C	1; 3C	2; 2F	1; 2F	2; 1C	1; B	2	12	16	?
26	27	28	29	30	31	32	33	34	35	36	37	38	39	40	41	42	43	44	45	46	47	48	49	50	51	52	53	54	55	56	57	58	59	60	61	62	63	64	65	66	67	68	69	70	71	72	73	74	75	76	77	78	79	80	81	82	83	84	85	86	87	88	89	90	91	92	93	94	95	96	97	98	99	00	01	02	03	04	05	06	07	08	09	10	11	12	13	14	15	16	17	18	19

Tweede Divisie	Derde Divisie	Hoofdklasse	Eerste Klasse	Tweede Klasse	Derde Klasse	Vierde Klasse	Emergency League
