= 2016 MLS Re-Entry Draft =

College draft for soccer teams

General information
- Dates: Stage 1: December 16, 2016; Stage 2: December 22, 2016

Overview
- League: Major League Soccer
- Teams: 22

The two-stage 2016 MLS Re-Entry Draft took place on December 16, 2016 (Stage 1) and December 22, 2016 (Stage 2). All 22 Major League Soccer clubs were eligible to participate. The priority order for the Re-Entry Draft was reverse order of finish in 2016, taking into account playoff performance. The two 2017 expansion teams, Atlanta United FC and Minnesota United FC, had selections 21 and 22, respectively.

Available to all teams in Stage 1 of the Re-Entry draft were:

- Players who were at least 23-years-old and had a minimum of three MLS service years whose options were not exercised by their clubs (available at option salary for 2017).
- Players who were at least 25-years-old with a minimum of four years of MLS experience who were out of contract and whose club did not wish to re-sign them at their previous salary (available for at least their 2016 salary).

Players who were not selected in Stage 1 of the Re-Entry Draft were made available in Stage 2. Clubs selecting players in Stage 2 were able to negotiate a new salary with the player. Players who remained unselected after Stage 2 were made available to any MLS club on a first-come, first-served basis.

Teams also had the option of passing on their selection.

== Available players ==
Players were required to meet age and service requirements to participate as stipulated by the terms of the MLS Collective Bargaining Agreement. The league released a list of all players available for the Re-Entry Draft on December 16, 2016.

Player	Position	Released By	Re-Entry Draft Result
Răzvan Cociș	M	Chicago Fire	Not selected
Eric Gehrig	D	Chicago Fire	Not selected
Patrick McLain	G	Chicago Fire	Selected by Orlando City in Stage One
Michael Stephens	D	Chicago Fire	Not selected
Conor Doyle	F	Colorado Rapids	Not selected
Chad Barson	D	Columbus Crew SC	Not selected
Steve Clark	G	Columbus Crew SC	Not selected
Andrew Dykstra	G	D.C. United	Selected by Sporting Kansas City in Stage Two
Chris Korb	D	D.C. United	Not selected
Norberto Paparatto	D	FC Dallas	Not selected
Mauro Rosales	M	FC Dallas	Not selected
Cristian Maidana	M	Houston Dynamo	Not selected
Abdoulie Mansally	F	Houston Dynamo	Not selected
Leonardo	D	Los Angeles Galaxy	Selected by Houston Dynamo in Stage Two
Kyle Bekker	M	Montreal Impact	Not selected
Daigo Kobayashi	M	New England Revolution	Re-signed with New England prior to Stage Two
Steve Neumann	M	New England Revolution	Retired prior to Stage Two
Tony Taylor	F	New York City FC	Not selected
Karl Ouimette	D	New York Red Bulls	Not selected
Pedro Ribiero	F	Orlando City SC	Not selected
Leo Fernandes	M	Philadelphia Union	Not selected
Chris Klute	D	Portland Timbers	Not selected
Chris Konopka	G	Portland Timbers	Not selected
Jermaine Taylor	D	Portland Timbers	Not selected
Olmes García	F	Real Salt Lake	Selected by San Jose Earthquakes in Stage Two
Devon Sandoval	F	Real Salt Lake	Not selected
John Stertzer	M	Real Salt Lake	Not selected
Bryan Meredith	G	San Jose Earthquakes	Selected by Seattle Sounders in Stage One
Sanna Nyassi	M	San Jose Earthquakes	Not selected
Mark Sherrod	F	San Jose Earthquakes	Not selected
Jordan Stewart	D	San Jose Earthquakes	Not selected
Michael Farfan	M	Seattle Sounders FC	Not selected
Damion Lowe	D	Seattle Sounders FC	Not selected
Dylan Remick	D	Seattle Sounders FC	Selected by Houston Dynamo in Stage One
Jon Kempin	G	Sporting Kansas City	Not selected
Daniel Lovitz	M	Toronto FC	Not selected
Josh Williams	D	Toronto FC	Selected by Columbus Crew in Stage Two
Pedro Morales	M	Vancouver Whitecaps FC	Not selected
Blas Pérez	F	Vancouver Whitecaps FC	Not selected

== Stage One ==
The first stage of the 2016 MLS Re-Entry Draft took place on December 16, 2016.

=== Round 1 ===
Pick #	Drafting Team	Player	Position	Former Team
1	Chicago Fire	Pass		
2	Houston Dynamo	Dylan Remick	D	Seattle Sounders
3	Columbus Crew SC	Pass		
4	San Jose Earthquakes	Pass		
5	Vancouver Whitecaps FC	Pass		
6	Orlando City SC	Patrick McLain	G	Chicago Fire
7	New England Revolution	Pass		
8	Portland Timbers	Pass		
9	Philadelphia Union	Pass		
10	D.C. United	Pass		
11	Real Salt Lake	Pass		
12	Sporting Kansas City	Pass		
13	Los Angeles Galaxy	Pass		
14	New York City FC	Pass		
15	New York Red Bulls	Pass		
16	FC Dallas	Pass		
17	Montreal Impact	Pass		
18	Colorado Rapids	Pass		
19	Toronto FC	Pass		
20	Seattle Sounders FC	Bryan Meredith	G	San Jose Earthquakes
21	Atlanta United FC	Pass		
22	Minnesota United FC	Pass		

=== Round 2 ===
Pick #	Drafting Team	Player	Position	Former Team
23	Houston Dynamo	Pass		
24	Orlando City SC	Pass		
25	Seattle Sounders FC	Pass		

== Stage Two ==
The second stage of the 2016 MLS Re-Entry Draft took place on December 22, 2016.

=== Round 1 ===
Pick #	Drafting Team	Player	Position	Former Team
1	Chicago Fire	Pass		
2	Houston Dynamo	Leonardo	D	Los Angeles Galaxy
3	Columbus Crew SC	Josh Williams	D	Toronto FC
4	San Jose Earthquakes	Olmes García	F	Real Salt Lake
5	Vancouver Whitecaps FC	Pass		
6	Orlando City SC	Pass		
7	New England Revolution	Pass		
8	Portland Timbers	Pass		
9	Philadelphia Union	Pass		
10	D.C. United	Pass		
11	Real Salt Lake	Pass		
12	Sporting Kansas City	Andrew Dykstra	G	D.C. United
13	Los Angeles Galaxy	Pass		
14	New York City FC	Pass		
15	New York Red Bulls	Pass		
16	FC Dallas	Pass		
17	Montreal Impact	Pass		
18	Colorado Rapids	Pass		
19	Toronto FC	Pass		
20	Seattle Sounders FC	Pass		
21	Atlanta United FC	Pass		
22	Minnesota United FC	Pass		

=== Round 2 ===
Pick #	Drafting Team	Player	Position	Former Team
23	Houston Dynamo	Pass		
24	Columbus Crew SC	Pass		
25	San Jose Earthquakes	Pass		
26	Sporting Kansas City	Pass		
