= Patrick Doody =

American soccer player

Personal information
- Date of birth: April 22, 1992 (age 34)
- Place of birth: Naperville, Illinois, U.S.
- Height: 1.83 m (6 ft 0 in)
- Position: Defender

Youth career
- 2008–2011: Chicago Fire

College career
Years	Team	Apps	(Gls)
2011–2014	Indiana Hoosiers		

Senior career*
Years	Team	Apps	(Gls)
2012–2014	Chicago Fire U-23	14	(0)
2015–2017	Chicago Fire	14	(0)
2015–2017	→ Saint Louis FC (loan)	33	(2)
- * Club domestic league appearances and goals as of 17:20, 26 October 2017 (UTC)

Patrick Doody (born April 22, 1992) is an American retired soccer player who last played for the Chicago Fire in the MLS.

== Career ==
=== Youth College ===
Doody was a member of the Chicago Fire Academy for three seasons before spending his college career at Indiana University. He made a total of 86 appearances for the Hoosiers and tallied six goals and 12 assists, helping lead them to a College Cup title in 2012.

Doody also played in the Premier Development League for Chicago Fire U-23.

=== Professional ===
On December 22, 2014, Doody signed a homegrown contract with the Chicago Fire. On March 20, he was sent on loan to United Soccer League affiliate club Saint Louis FC. He made his professional debut for the club a week later in a 2–0 defeat to Louisville City FC.

On November 30, 2015, the Fire exercised their contract option on Doody, retaining him for the 2016 season, then again sent him on loan to Saint Louis FC on March 25, 2016.

On November 23, 2016, Doody's contract option was exercised by the Fire, keeping him with the club for another season. After not making any appearances for the club, he was loaned back out to Saint Louis FC until he was recalled back to the Fire on July 25, 2017.
