= Eric Gehrig =

American soccer player

Personal information
- Full name: Eric Gehrig
- Date of birth: December 25, 1987 (age 38)
- Place of birth: Harvey, Illinois, United States
- Height: 6 ft 1 in (1.85 m)
- Position: Defender

College career
Years	Team	Apps	(Gls)
2006–2009	Loyola Ramblers		

Senior career*
Years	Team	Apps	(Gls)
2008–2009	Chicago Fire Premier	7	(1)
2011–2014	Columbus Crew	46	(0)
2015–2016	Chicago Fire	30	(0)
2016	→ Saint Louis FC (loan)	1	(0)

Managerial career
- 2017–2019: Chicago Fire (assistant)
- * Club domestic league appearances and goals as of November 11, 2016

Eric Otto Gehrig (born December 25, 1987) is an American former soccer player who was most recently an assistant coach for Chicago Fire of MLS.

== Career ==
=== College and amateur ===
Gehrig played for Ajax FC Chicago then Loyola University Chicago from 2006 to 2009. Gehrig was a three-time All-Horizon League player. He appeared in all 78 of the Ramblers' matches in that time, and captained the team for three years.

=== Professional ===
Eric Gehrig was signed by Columbus Crew on March 17, 2011. He made his MLS regular season debut on June 26, 2011, against the Colorado Rapids, coming on as a sub in the 85th minute for Emmanuel Ekpo. He also started and played all 90 minutes in an Open Cup third round match against the Richmond Kickers on June 28, 2011. Gehrig made his first career MLS regular season start and played all 90 minutes in a 1–0 win at Vancouver on July 6, 2011.

On December 10, 2014, Gehrig was the 10th round pick in the 2014 MLS Expansion Draft by Orlando City SC, promptly being traded to Chicago Fire for a second-round selection in the 2016 MLS SuperDraft.

Gehrig went on to start 25 games for the Chicago Fire and was named 2015 Fire Defender of the Year. On November 23, 2016, Gehrig's contract option was not exercised by Chicago Fire. He became eligible for the Re-Entry Draft but wasn't selected. On February 15, 2017, Gehrig announced his retirement. On the same day he was named assistant coach for Chicago Fire.
