= Jorge Bava =

Uruguayan footballer (born 1981)

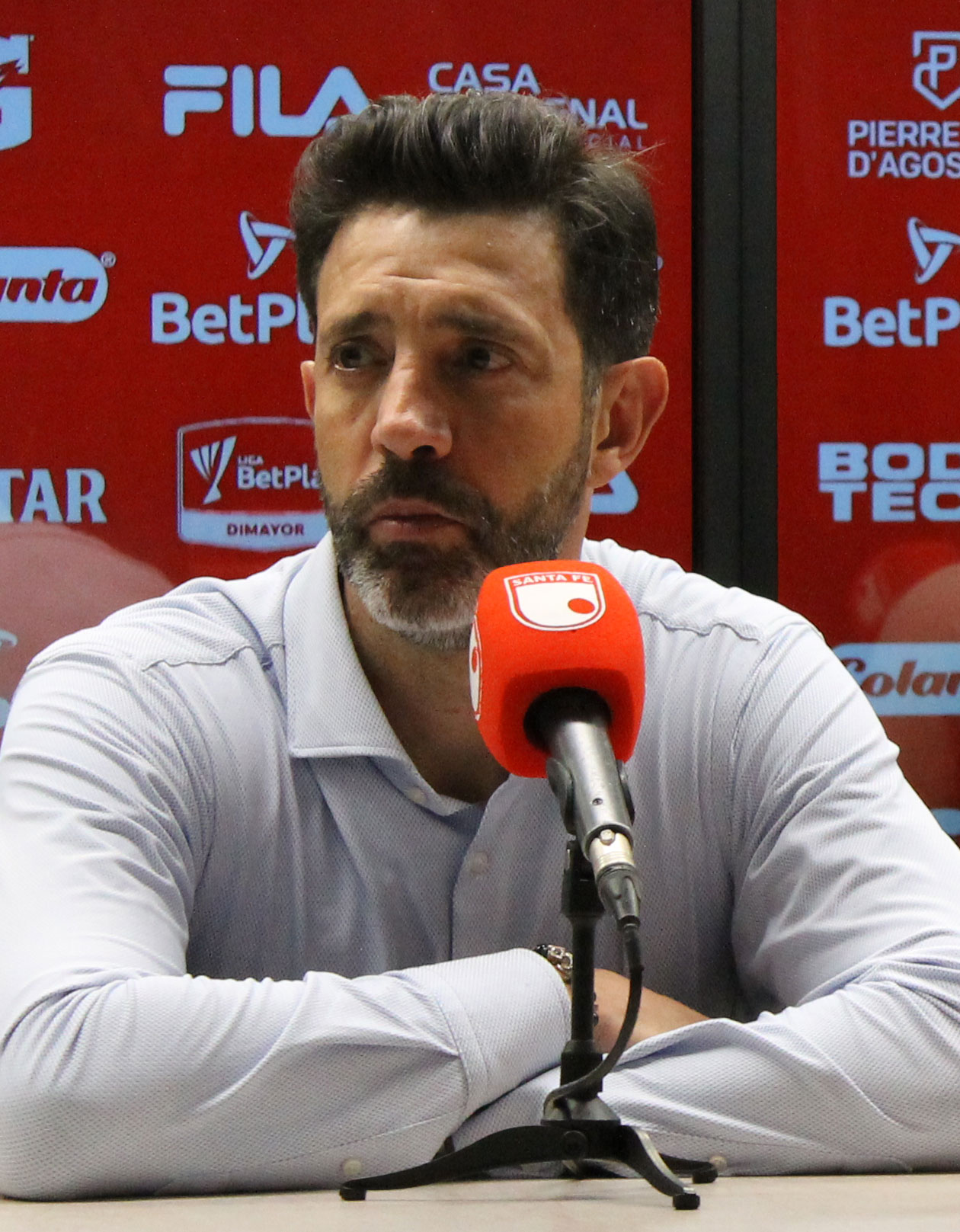
- Bava as the manager of Santa Fe in 2025

Personal information
- Full name: Jorge Rodrigo Bava
- Date of birth: 2 August 1981 (age 45)
- Place of birth: Montevideo, Uruguay
- Height: 1.93 m (6 ft 4 in)
- Position: Goalkeeper

Youth career
- Cerromar

Senior career*
Years	Team	Apps	(Gls)
1998–2000	Progreso	12	(0)
2000–2001	Peñarol	3	(0)
2001–2002	Juventud	18	(0)
2002	Nacional	2	(0)
2002–2003	Bella Vista	16	(0)
2003–2006	Nacional	58	(0)
2006–2010	Libertad	32	(0)
2008	→ Atlas (loan)	33	(0)
2010–2012	Rosario Central	6	(0)
2012–2015	Nacional	43	(0)
2015–2016	Liverpool Montevideo	27	(0)
2016–2017	Atletico Bucaramanga	21	(0)
2017–2018	Chicago Fire	8	(0)
2018–2019	Liverpool Montevideo	48	(0)
2019–2020	Guaraní	7	(0)
2021	Liverpool Montevideo	4	(0)

International career
2004	Uruguay U23	1	(0)

Managerial career
- 2021–2023: Liverpool Montevideo
- 2024: León
- 2025: Santa Fe
- 2025–2026: Cerro Porteño
- 2026: Nacional
- * Club domestic league appearances and goals

Jorge Rodrigo Bava (born 2 August 1981) is a Uruguayan football manager and former player who played as a goalkeeper.

== Playing career ==
After beginning his career with Cerromar in the youth categories, Bava made his senior debut with Progreso in 1998. He joined Peñarol in 2000, but played rarely before moving to Juventud de Las Piedras in the following year.

Bava signed for Nacional in 2002, but featured rarely before joining Bella Vista shortly after. Back to Nacional in the following year, he was a first-choice during the 2005–06 season as the club won the championship.

In 2006, Bava moved abroad and joined Libertad in Paraguay. He moved to Mexican side Atlas on loan in January 2008, but returned to his parent club in November after the club failed to agree new terms.

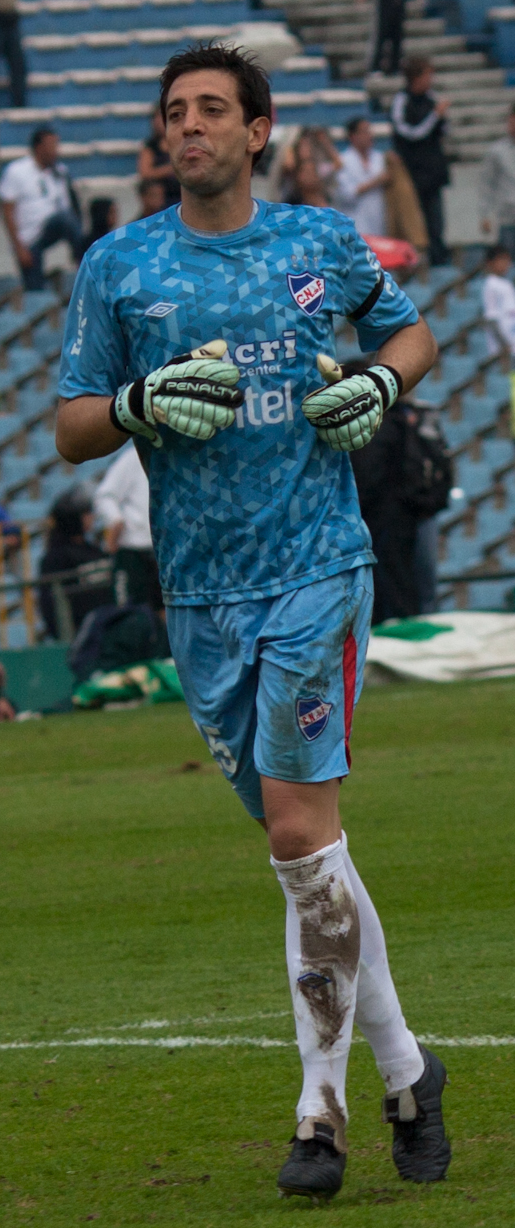
Bava playing for Nacional in 2012

In January 2010, Rosario Central signed Bava on a two-year contract. On 10 January 2012, he returned to Nacional for a third spell.

In July 2015, after losing his starting spot, Bava agreed to a deal with Liverpool Montevideo. After one season as a starter, he signed for Atletico Bucaramanga in Colombia on 8 July 2016.

On 7 January 2017, Bava signed with Major League Soccer club Chicago Fire to a one-year contract with two one-year options. His contract was terminated by mutual consent on 18 January 2018, and returned to Liverpool shortly after.

In May 2019, Bava confirmed his departure from Liverpool, and returned to Paraguay to join Guaraní. He left the latter on 6 October 2020 due to personal reasons, and returned to Liverpool the following 5 January.

== Managerial career ==
On 15 June 2021, Bava agreed to become manager of his last club Liverpool after a match against Plaza Colonia, with Gustavo Ferrín remaining as an interim. He led the club to their first-ever league title in the 2023 campaign, being also elected Best Manager of the competition.

Bava resigned from Liverpool on 19 December 2023, and returned to Mexico to take over León three days later. Sacked on 1 September 2024, he was appointed at the helm of Independiente Santa Fe on 27 March 2025, but resigned on 24 September.

On 29 September 2025, five days after leaving Santa Fe, Bava was appointed manager of Cerro Porteño in Paraguay. Dismissed the following 19 March, he returned to Nacional three days later, now as manager.

On 16 August 2026, Bava was sacked from Nacional.

== Managerial statistics ==
As of 15 August 2026

Managerial record by team and tenure
Team	Nat	From	To	Record							
Team	Nat	From	To	G	W	D	L	GF	GA	GD	Win %
Liverpool Fútbol Club	(Uruguay)	18 June 2021	31 December 2023	117	60	23	34	171	119	+52	51.28
Club León	(Mexico)	1 January 2024	1 September 2024	25	7	8	10	31	38	−7	28.00
Independiente Santa Fe	(Colombia)	27 March 2025	24 September 2025	31	14	10	7	37	26	+11	45.16
Club Cerro Porteño	(Paraguay)	29 September 2025	19 March 2026	19	11	5	3	23	11	+12	57.89
Nacional	(Uruguay)	22 March 2026	16 August 2026	25	11	3	11	36	42	−6	44.00
Total				217	103	49	65	298	236	+62	47.47

== Honours ==
=== Player ===
Nacional

- Uruguayan Primera División: 2002, 2005, 2005–06

Libertad

- Paraguayan Primera División: 2007

=== Manager ===
Liverpool Montevideo

- Uruguayan Primera División: 2023

Santa Fe

- Categoría Primera A: 2025 Apertura

Cerro Porteño

- Copa de Primera: 2025 Clausura
