= Patrick McLain =

American soccer goalkeeper (born 1988)

Personal information
- Full name: Patrick S. McLain
- Date of birth: August 22, 1988 (age 38)
- Place of birth: Eau Claire, Wisconsin, United States
- Height: 1.91 m (6 ft 3 in)
- Position: Goalkeeper

College career
Years	Team	Apps	(Gls)
2007–2011	Cal Poly Mustangs		

Senior career*
Years	Team	Apps	(Gls)
2009	Portland Timbers U23s	1	(0)
2010–2011	Orange County Blue Star	20	(0)
2012–2013	Chivas USA	2	(0)
2013	→ Los Angeles Blues (loan)	0	(0)
2014	Orange County Blues	15	(0)
2015	Sacramento Republic	24	(0)
2016	Chicago Fire	1	(0)
2016	→ Saint Louis FC (loan)	1	(0)
2017	Minnesota United	0	(0)
2018	Chicago Fire	5	(0)
2019	Orange County SC	12	(0)
- * Club domestic league appearances and goals as of July 20, 2019

Patrick S. McLain (born August 22, 1988, in Eau Claire, Wisconsin) is an American soccer goalkeeper.

== Career ==
=== Early and collegiate ===
McLain attended California Polytechnic State University in San Luis Obispo, where he played soccer between 2007 and 2011. McLain earned second All-Big West second team spot his junior year after leading all conference goalkeepers with a program-record .835 save percentage and ranking second with 5.46 saves per match, third with five shut-outs and fourth with 71 saves

=== Chivas USA ===
McLain signed with MLS club Chivas USA in 2012, making his debut with the club on May 5, 2013. He had a brief loan spell in April 2013 with USL Pro club Los Angeles Blues.

=== Sacramento Republic ===
McLain signed with United Soccer League club Sacramento Republic on February 17, 2015. He was named to the USL Team of the Week in week 13. On December 9, 2015, Republic FC declined the option on McLain for the 2016 season.

=== Chicago Fire ===
McLain signed with MLS club Chicago Fire on January 18, 2016. On April 22, he was sent on short-term loan to the Fire's USL affiliate Saint Louis FC. The next day, he got the start in goal for Saint Louis against Sacramento Republic, keeping a clean sheet in a 1–0 victory over his old team.

McLain was released by Chicago at the end of their 2018 season.

=== Orlando City ===
On December 16, 2016, McLain was selected by Orlando City in the second round of the 2016 Re-Entry Draft Stage 1.
