= List of Major League Soccer transfers 2016 =

The following is a list of transfers for the 2016 Major League Soccer season that have been made during the 2015–16 MLS offseason all the way through to the roster freeze on September 1, 2016.

The 2015–16 offseason is the first in the history of MLS in which free agency is allowed for qualified veteran players. Justin Mapp became the first MLS free-agent transfer on December 14, 2015, when he signed with Sporting Kansas City.

== Transfers ==
Date	Name	Moving from	Moving to	Mode of Transfer
November 3, 2015	(United States) Tyler Adams	(United States) New York Red Bulls II	New York Red Bulls	Free
November 9, 2015	(United States) Mason Stajduhar	(United States) Orlando City U-23	Orlando City SC	Homegrown player
December 6, 2015	(United States) Lamar Neagle	Seattle Sounders FC	D.C. United	Trade
December 6, 2015	(United States) Chris Pontius	D.C. United	Philadelphia Union	Trade
December 7, 2015	(Argentina) Cristian Maidana	Philadelphia Union	Houston Dynamo	Trade
December 7, 2015	(United States) Andrew Wenger	Philadelphia Union	Houston Dynamo	Trade
December 7, 2015	(United States) Kenney Walker	LA Galaxy	(United States) FC Cincinnati	Free
December 9, 2015	(Uganda) Michael Azira	Seattle Sounders FC	Colorado Rapids	2015 Waiver Draft
December 9, 2015	(Kenya) Lawrence Olum	(Malaysia) Kedah FA	Sporting Kansas City	Free
December 10, 2015	(United States) Ethan White	Philadelphia Union	New York City FC	Trade
December 10, 2015	(Jamaica) Dane Richards	New York Red Bulls	(United States) Miami FC	Free
December 11, 2015	(Argentina) Maximiliano Urruti	Portland Timbers	FC Dallas	2015 Re-Entry Draft
December 11, 2015	(United States) Alec Kann	Chicago Fire	Sporting Kansas City	2015 Re-Entry Draft
December 11, 2015	(United States) Jorge Villafaña	Portland Timbers	(Mexico) Santos Laguna	Undisclosed
December 11, 2015	(United States) Chris Klute	Columbus Crew SC	Portland Timbers	Trade
December 11, 2015	(United States) Zac MacMath	Philadelphia Union	Colorado Rapids	Trade
December 14, 2015	(United States) Justin Mapp	Free Agent	Sporting Kansas City	Free
December 15, 2015	(United States) Dan Kennedy	FC Dallas	LA Galaxy	Trade
December 15, 2015	(Guatemala) Marco Pappa	Seattle Sounders FC	Colorado Rapids	Trade
December 16, 2015	(United States) Drew Moor	Free Agent	Toronto FC	Free
December 16, 2015	(France) Clément Diop	(United States) LA Galaxy II	LA Galaxy	Free
December 16, 2015	(Iceland) Kristinn Steindórsson	Columbus Crew SC	(Sweden) GIF Sundsvall	Free
December 17, 2015	(United States) Kevin Alston	New England Revolution	Orlando City SC	2015 Re-Entry Draft
December 17, 2015	(Jamaica) Jermaine Taylor	Houston Dynamo	Portland Timbers	2015 Re-Entry Draft
December 17, 2015	(United States) Joey Calistri	(United States) Chicago Fire Academy	Chicago Fire	Homegrown player
December 17, 2015	(United States) Drew Conner	(United States) Chicago Fire Academy	Chicago Fire	Homegrown player
December 17, 2015	(United States) Daniel Steres	(United States) LA Galaxy II	LA Galaxy	Free
December 18, 2015	(United States) Corey Ashe	Free Agent	Columbus Crew SC	Free
December 18, 2015	(Iran) Steven Beitashour	Vancouver Whitecaps FC	Toronto FC	Trade
December 18, 2015	(Canada) Will Johnson	Portland Timbers	Toronto FC	Trade
December 21, 2015	(United States) Joe Bendik	Toronto FC	Orlando City SC	Trade
December 21, 2015	(United States) Tyler Miller	(United States) Seattle Sounders FC 2	Seattle Sounders FC	Free
December 21, 2015	(Haiti) Derrick Etienne	(United States) New York Red Bulls Academy	New York Red Bulls	Homegrown player
December 21, 2015	(United States) Brandon Allen	(United States) New York Red Bulls Academy	New York Red Bulls	Homegrown player
December 22, 2015	(United States) Alex Muyl	(United States) New York Red Bulls Academy	New York Red Bulls	Homegrown player
December 22, 2015	(United States) Omar Gonzalez	LA Galaxy	(Mexico) Pachuca	Undisclosed
December 22, 2015	(Costa Rica) Leonardo González	Seattle Sounders FC	(Costa Rica) Herediano	Free
December 23, 2015	(United States) Bradley Bourgeois	(United States) Houston Dynamo Academy	Houston Dynamo	Homegrown player
December 23, 2015	(United States) Luis Gil	Real Salt Lake	(Mexico) Querétaro	Free
December 23, 2015	(United States) Mael Corboz	(United States) New York Red Bulls Academy	New York Red Bulls	Homegrown player
December 23, 2015	(United States) Scott Thomsen	(United States) New York Red Bulls Academy	New York Red Bulls	Homegrown player
December 23, 2015	(United States) Chris Thorsheim	(United States) New York Red Bulls Academy	New York Red Bulls	Homegrown player
December 24, 2015	(England) Andy Rose	Seattle Sounders FC	(England) Coventry City	Free
December 24, 2015	(Brazil) Juninho	LA Galaxy	(Mexico) Tijuana	Unidsclosed
December 28, 2015	(United States) Chad Barrett	Free Agent	San Jose Earthquakes	Free
December 28, 2015	(Costa Rica) Roy Miller	New York Red Bulls	(Costa Rica) Saprissa	Free
December 28, 2015	(Democratic Republic of the Congo) Danny Mwanga	Orlando City SC	(United States) Tampa Bay Rowdies	Free
December 29, 2015	(Japan) Masato Kudo	(Japan) Kashiwa Reysol	Vancouver Whitecaps FC	Free
December 29, 2015	(Honduras) Danilo Acosta	(United States) Real Monarchs	Real Salt Lake	Homegrown player
December 30, 2015	(England) Liam Ridgewell	Portland Timbers	(England) Brighton & Hove Albion	Loan
January 5, 2016	(Mexico) Aaron Guillen	(United States) Florida Gulf Coast	FC Dallas	Homegrown player
January 5, 2016	(Austria) Emanuel Pogatetz	Columbus Crew SC	(Germany) Union Berlin	Free
January 6, 2016	(Jamaica) Simon Dawkins	(England) Derby County	San Jose Earthquakes	Free
January 6, 2016	(Uruguay) Cristian Techera	(Uruguay) River Plate Montevideo	Vancouver Whitecaps FC	Undisclosed
January 6, 2016	(United States) Jeff Larentowicz	Free Agent	LA Galaxy	Free
January 6, 2016	(Ghana) Patrick Nyarko	Chicago Fire	D.C. United	Trade
January 7, 2016	(United States) Brad Davis	Houston Dynamo	Sporting Kansas City	Trade
January 7, 2016	(United States) Jordan Schweitzer	(United States) Denver Pioneers	Seattle Sounders FC	Homegrown player
January 8, 2016	(United States) Michael Nanchoff	Portland Timbers	(United States) Tampa Bay Rowdies	Free
January 11, 2016	(United States) Jalil Anibaba	Sporting Kansas City	Houston Dynamo	Free
January 12, 2016	(United States) Zarek Valentin	Montreal Impact	Portland Timbers	Trade
January 12, 2016	(United States) Ned Grabavoy	Free Agent	Portland Timbers	Free
January 12, 2016	(Colombia) Wálter Restrepo	(United States) New York Cosmos	Philadelphia Union	Undisclosed
January 12, 2016	(Sierra Leone) Michael Lahoud	Philadelphia Union	(United States) New York Cosmos	Loan
January 12, 2016	(Mexico) Sebastian Saucedo	Real Salt Lake	(Mexico) Veracruz	Loan
January 12, 2016	(Jamaica) Lovel Palmer	Chicago Fire	(United States) Indy Eleven	Free
January 13, 2016	(Hungary) Dániel Sallói	(Hungary) Újpest FC	Sporting Kansas City	Homegrown player
January 13, 2016	(Argentina) Andrés Imperiale	(Costa Rica) Saprissa	San Jose Earthquakes	Free
January 13, 2016	(United States) Jack McInerney	Columbus Crew SC	Portland Timbers	Trade
January 13, 2016	(Brazil) Anderson Conceição	(Brazil) Tombense	Philadelphia Union	Loan
January 13, 2016	(Cameroon) Marius Obekop	New York Red Bulls	(United States) Orlando City B	Free
January 14, 2016	(United States) Mike Magee	Free Agent	LA Galaxy	Free
January 14, 2016	(Ghana) Emmanuel Boateng	(Sweden) Helsingborgs IF	LA Galaxy	Free
January 14, 2016	(Trinidad and Tobago) Joevin Jones	Chicago Fire	Seattle Sounders FC	Trade
January 14, 2016	(Costa Rica) Jairo Arrieta	D.C. United	(United States) New York Cosmos	Free
January 14, 2016	(England) Jack Harrison	(United States) Wake Forest Demon Deacons	New York City F.C.	SuperDraft
January 14, 2016	(United States) Brandon Vincent	(United States) Stanford Cardinal	Chicago Fire	SuperDraft
January 14, 2016	(United States) Jonathan Campbell	(United States) North Carolina Tar Heels	Chicago Fire	SuperDraft
January 15, 2016	(United States) Zach Pfeffer	Philadelphia Union	Colorado Rapids	Trade
January 15, 2016	(Armenia) Yura Movsisyan	(Russia) Spartak Moscow	Real Salt Lake	Loan
January 15, 2016	(England) Matt Watson	Chicago Fire	(United States) Carolina RailHawks	Free
January 18, 2016	(United States) Michael Harrington	Free Agent	Chicago Fire	Free
January 18, 2016	(United States) Patrick McLain	(United States) Sacramento Republic	Chicago Fire	Free
January 18, 2016	(Argentina) Lucas Ontivero	(Turkey) Galatasaray	Montreal Impact	Loan
January 18, 2016	(United States) Clint Irwin	Colorado Rapids	Toronto FC	Trade
January 18, 2016	(Honduras) Deybi Flores	(Honduras) C.D. Motagua	Vancouver Whitecaps FC	Undisclosed
January 20, 2016	(Colombia) Juan Esteban Ortiz	(Colombia) Atlético Huila	FC Dallas	Free
January 20, 2016	(Costa Rica) Christian Bolaños	(Costa Rica) Saprissa	Vancouver Whitecaps FC	Undisclosed
January 20, 2016	(Costa Rica) Rónald Matarrita	(Costa Rica) Alajuelense	New York City FC	Undisclosed
January 20, 2016	(United States) Michael Farfan	D.C. United	Seattle Sounders FC	Free
January 21, 2016	(Argentina) Sebastián Jaime	Real Salt Lake	(Chile) Universidad Católica	Free
January 21, 2016	(United States) Jordan Morris	(United States) Stanford	Seattle Sounders FC	Homegrown player
January 21, 2016	(Nigeria) Stephen Sunday	(Turkey) Alanyaspor	Real Salt Lake	Free
January 21, 2016	(Brazil) Michel	FC Dallas	(United States) Rayo OKC	Free
January 22, 2016	(Guinea-Bissau) Sambinha	(Portugal) Sporting B	New England Revolution	Loan
January 22, 2016	(Denmark) Emil Larsen	(Denmark) OB	Columbus Crew SC	Free
January 22, 2016	(Argentina) Diego Martínez	(Argentina) River Plate	New York City FC	Free
January 22, 2016	(Guyana) Emery Welshman	(United States) Real Monarchs	Real Salt Lake	Free
January 23, 2016	(Ecuador) Carlos Gruezo	(Germany) VfB Stuttgart	FC Dallas	Undisclosed
January 23, 2016	(Argentina) Víctor Cabrera	(Argentina) River Plate	Montreal Impact	Undisclosed
January 23, 2016	(Portugal) João Meira	(Portugal) Belenenses	Chicago Fire	Free
January 25, 2016	(United States) Tommy Meyer	LA Galaxy	(United States) Swope Park Rangers	Free
January 25, 2016	(Greece) Alexandros Tabakis	(Greece) Panathinaikos	Atlanta United FC	Free
January 25, 2016	(Greece) Alexandros Tabakis	Atlanta United FC	(United States) Charleston Battery	Loan
January 26, 2016	(United States) Conor Casey	Free Agent	Columbus Crew SC	Free
January 26, 2016	(Honduras) Maynor Figueroa	Colorado Rapids	FC Dallas	Trade
January 26, 2016	(Belgium) Jelle Van Damme	(Belgium) Standard Liège	LA Galaxy	Free
January 26, 2016	(Portugal) Nuno André Coelho	(Turkey) Balıkesirspor	Sporting Kansas City	Free
January 26, 2016	(United States) Mikey Lopez	Sporting Kansas City	New York City FC	Free
January 26, 2016	(Argentina) Juan Ramírez	Colorado Rapids	(Spain) UD Almería	Loan
January 27, 2016	(Spain) David Rocha	(Spain) Gimnàstic	Houston Dynamo	Free
January 27, 2016	(Spain) Agus	(Spain) Albacete	Houston Dynamo	Free
January 27, 2016	(England) Ashley Cole	(Italy) Roma	LA Galaxy	Free
January 27, 2016	(Honduras) Devron García	(Honduras) C.D. Victoria	Orlando City SC	Undisclosed
January 27, 2016	(United States) Nick LaBrocca	Free Agent	Chicago Fire	Free
January 28, 2016	(France) Frédéric Brillant	(Belgium) KV Oostende	New York City FC	Undisclosed
January 29, 2016	(Canada) Fraser Aird	(Scotland) Rangers	Vancouver Whitecaps FC	Loan
January 29, 2016	(Hungary) Krisztián Németh	Sporting Kansas City	(Qatar) Al-Gharafa	Undisclosed
January 30, 2016	(United States) Matt Miazga	New York Red Bulls	(England) Chelsea	Undisclosed
January 30, 2016	(Argentina) Leonel Miranda	(Argentina) Independiente	Houston Dynamo	Loan
February 1, 2016	(United States) Erik Palmer-Brown	Sporting Kansas City	(Portugal) FC Porto	Loan
February 1, 2016	(Ivory Coast) Xavier Kouassi	(Switzerland) FC Sion	New England Revolution	Free
February 1, 2016	(Albania) Shkëlzen Gashi	(Switzerland) FC Basel	Colorado Rapids	Undisclosed
February 1, 2016	(Brazil) Marcelo Sarvas	Colorado Rapids	D.C. United	Trade
February 2, 2016	(United States) George Fochive	Portland Timbers	(Denmark) Viborg FF	Undisclosed
February 2, 2016	(Netherlands) Johan Kappelhof	(Netherlands) FC Groningen	Chicago Fire	Undisclosed
February 2, 2016	(El Salvador) Junior Burgos	(United States) Atlanta Silverbacks	Atlanta United FC	Free
February 2, 2016	(El Salvador) Junior Burgos	Atlanta United FC	(United States) Tampa Bay Rowdies	Loan
February 2, 2016	(United States) Chris Wingert	New York City FC	Real Salt Lake	Waivers
February 3, 2016	(Netherlands) Nigel de Jong	(Italy) Milan	LA Galaxy	Free
February 3, 2016	(Egypt) Amro Tarek	(Spain) Real Betis	Columbus Crew SC	Loan
February 3, 2016	(Brazil) Rodrigo Ramos	(Brazil) Coritiba	Chicago Fire	Loan
February 4, 2016	(Norway) Ola Kamara	Austria Wien	Columbus Crew SC	Undisclosed
February 4, 2016	(Netherlands) Roland Alberg	(Netherlands) ADO Den Haag	Philadelphia Union	Undisclosed
February 5, 2016	(Trinidad and Tobago) Mekeil Williams	(Guatemala) Antigua GFC	Colorado Rapids	Undisclosed
February 9, 2016	(Ghana) Gideon Baah	(Finland) HJK Helsinki	New York Red Bulls	Undisclosed
February 9, 2016	(United States) Conor Doyle	D.C. United	Colorado Rapids	Trade
February 9, 2016	(England) Matt Jones	(Portugal) Belenenses	Philadelphia Union	Loan
February 11, 2016	(Ghana) Gershon Koffie	Vancouver Whitecaps FC	New England Revolution	Trade
February 12, 2016	(Colombia) Carlos Lizarazo	(Mexico) Cruz Azul	FC Dallas	Loan
February 13, 2016	(United States) Harry Shipp	Chicago Fire	Montreal Impact	Trade
February 14, 2016	(United States) Eric Miller	Montreal Impact	Colorado Rapids	Trade
February 15, 2016	(Argentina) Luciano Acosta	(Argentina) Boca Juniors	D.C. United	Loan
February 16, 2016	(Argentina) Mauro Rosales	Vancouver Whitecaps FC	FC Dallas	Trade
February 16, 2016	(Panama) Blas Pérez	FC Dallas	Vancouver Whitecaps FC	Trade
February 17, 2016	(England) Rob Vincent	(United States) Pittsburgh Riverhounds	D.C. United	Undisclosed
February 17, 2016	(Venezuela) Bernardo Añor	Sporting Kansas City	(United States) Minnesota United FC	Loan
February 18, 2016	(Italy) Antonio Nocerino	(Italy) AC Milan	D.C. United	Free
February 18, 2016	(Italy) Antonio Nocerino	D.C. United	Orlando City SC	Trade
February 18, 2016	(Jamaica) Je-Vaughn Watson	FC Dallas	New England Revolution	Mutual Contract Termination
February 18, 2016	(The Gambia) Abdoulie Mansally	Real Salt Lake	Houston Dynamo	Trade
February 19, 2016	(England) Paul Clowes	(United States) Clemson Tigers	D.C. United	SuperDraft
February 20, 2016	(Argentina) Federico Bravo	(Argentina) Boca Juniors	New York City FC	Loan
February 20, 2016	(Brazil) Ilsinho	(Ukraine) FC Shakhtar Donetsk	Philadelphia Union	Free
February 23, 2016	(United States) Nathan Sturgis	Houston Dynamo	Seattle Sounders FC	Free
February 23, 2016	(United States) Amobi Okugo	Sporting Kansas City	(United States) New York Red Bulls II	Free
February 24, 2016	(Panama) Alberto Quintero	(Mexico) Lobos BUAP	San Jose Earthquakes	Loan
February 25, 2016	(Nigeria) Obafemi Martins	Seattle Sounders FC	(China) Shanghai Greenland Shenhua F.C.	Transfer
February 26, 2016	(United States) Memo Rodriguez	Houston Dynamo	(United States) Rio Grande Valley FC Toros	Waived
February 26, 2016	(United States) Taylor Hunter	Houston Dynamo	(United States) Rio Grande Valley FC Toros	Waived
February 26, 2016	(United States) Matt Lampson	Columbus Crew SC	Chicago Fire	Free
February 26, 2016	(England) Luke Moore	Toronto FC		Waived
February 27, 2016	(United States) J. J. Koval	San Jose Earthquakes	(United States) Sacramento Republic	Waived
February 27, 2016	(Japan) Tsubasa Endoh	(United States) Maryland Terrapins	Toronto FC	SuperDraft
February 29, 2016	(Netherlands) John Goossens	(Romania) FC Voluntari	Chicago Fire	Free
February 29, 2016	(United States) Ryan Herman	(United States) Washington Huskies	FC Dallas	SuperDraft
February 29, 2016	(Germany) Timo Pitter	(United States) Creighton Bluejays	FC Dallas	SuperDraft
February 29, 2016	(Nigeria) Rasheed Olabiyi	Houston Dynamo		Waived
February 29, 2016	(United States) Dan Gargan	Los Angeles Galaxy		Waived
February 29, 2016	(Spain) Ignacio Maganto	Los Angeles Galaxy	(Croatia) Hajduk Split	Waived
February 29, 2016	(United States) Mael Corboz	New York Red Bulls	(United States) Wilmington Hammerheads FC	Waived
March 1, 2016	(Canada) Marcel de Jong	Sporting Kansas City	(Canada) Ottawa Fury FC	Mutual Contract Termination
March 1, 2016	(Belize) Michael Salazar	(United States) UC Riverside Highlanders	Montreal Impact	SuperDraft
March 1, 2016	(Jamaica) Neco Brett	(United States) Robert Morris Colonials	Portland Timbers	SuperDraft
March 1, 2016	(United States) Wade Hamilton	(United States) Cal Poly Mustangs	Portland Timbers	SuperDraft
March 1, 2016	(Saint Vincent and the Grenadines) Oalex Anderson	(United States) Seattle Sounders FC 2	Seattle Sounders FC	Signed
March 1, 2016	(United States) Jordan Schweitzer	Seattle Sounders FC	(United States) Seattle Sounders FC 2	Waived and signed
March 2, 2016	(United States) Collen Warner	Toronto FC	Houston Dynamo	Trade
March 2, 2016	(United States) Kingsley Bryce	Chicago Fire		Waived
March 2, 2016	(United States) Herculez Gomez	Toronto FC	Seattle Sounders FC	Waived
March 2, 2016	(United States) Colin Bonner	(United States) UNC Wilmington Seahawks	FC Dallas	SuperDraft
March 3, 2016	(El Salvador) Arturo Álvarez	(Hungary) Videoton FC	Chicago Fire	Free
March 3, 2016	(United States) Charlie Horton	(England) Leeds United	New England Revolution	Free
March 3, 2016	(United States) Charlie Horton	New England Revolution	D.C. United	Trade
March 3, 2016	(United States) Davy Arnaud	D.C. United		Retired
March 3, 2016	(England) Michael Gamble	(United States) Wake Forest Demon Deacons	New England Revolution	SuperDraft
March 3, 2016	(United States) Matt Turner	(United States) Fairfield Stags	New England Revolution	SuperDraft
March 3, 2016	(Trinidad and Tobago) Shannon Gomez	(Trinidad and Tobago) W Connection F.C.	New York City FC	Loan
March 3, 2016	(United States) Andre Rawls	(United States) Wilmington Hammerheads FC	New York City FC	Free
March 3, 2016	(United States) Zach Carroll	(United States) Michigan State Spartans	New York Red Bulls	SuperDraft
March 3, 2016	(United States) Justin Bilyeu	(United States) SIU Edwardsville Cougars	New York Red Bulls	SuperDraft
March 4, 2016	(United States) Jermaine Jones	New England Revolution	Colorado Rapids	Trade
March 4, 2016	(United States) Chris Froschauer	(United States) Ohio State Buckeyes	Colorado Rapids	SuperDraft
March 4, 2016	(Ghana) Emmanuel Appiah	(United States) Cincinnati Bearcats	Colorado Rapids	SuperDraft
March 4, 2016	(United States) Matt Pacifici	(United States) Davidson Wildcats	Columbus Crew SC	Free
March 4, 2016	(United States) Marshall Hollingsworth	(United States) Wheaton Thunder	Columbus Crew SC	SuperDraft
March 4, 2016	(Jamaica) Je-Vaughn Watson	FC Dallas	New England Revolution	Trade
March 4, 2016	(New Zealand) Kip Colvey	(United States) Cal Poly Mustangs	San Jose Earthquakes	SuperDraft
March 5, 2016	(Canada) Molham Babouli	(Canada) Toronto FC II	Toronto FC	USL
March 5, 2016	(Costa Rica) Ariel Lassiter	(United States) LA Galaxy II	LA Galaxy	USL
March 7, 2016	(United States) Scott Thomsen	New York Red Bulls	(United States) Richmond Kickers	Waived
March 8, 2016	(Chile) Diego Rubio	(Spain) Real Valladolid	Sporting Kansas City	Loan
March 8, 2016	(United States) Tony Alfaro	(United States) Cal State Dominguez Hills Toros	Seattle Sounders FC	Waived
March 8, 2016	(Jamaica) Damion Lowe	Seattle Sounders FC	(United States) Minnesota United FC	Loan
March 9, 2016	(England) Jack Barmby	(England) Leicester City	Portland Timbers	Loan
March 11, 2016	(United States) Alex Morrell	(United States) North Florida Ospreys	Chicago Fire	Loan
March 11, 2016	(Colombia) Steven Mendoza	(Brazil) Corinthians	New York City FC	Loan
March 11, 2016	(United States) Andrew Jacobson	New York City FC	Vancouver Whitecaps FC	Trade
March 14, 2016	(Jamaica) Darren Mattocks	Vancouver Whitecaps FC	Portland Timbers	Trade
March 20, 2016	(United States) Tim Howard	(England) Everton	Colorado Rapids	Free
March 23, 2016	(Brazil) Júlio Baptista	Free Agent	Orlando City SC	Free
March 23, 2016	(England) Paul Clowes	D.C. United	(United States) Richmond Kickers	Loan
March 23, 2016	(United States) Collin Martin	D.C. United	(United States) Richmond Kickers	Loan
March 23, 2016	(United States) Jalen Robinson	D.C. United	(United States) Richmond Kickers	Loan
May 2, 2016	(France) Aurélien Collin	Orlando City SC	New York Red Bulls	Trade
May 4, 2016	(Senegal) Khaly Thiam	(Hungary) MTK	Chicago Fire	Loan
May 10, 2016	(Sierra Leone) Alhaji Kamara	(Sweden) Norrköping	D.C. United	Undisclosed
May 10, 2016	(England) Paul Clowes	D.C. United	(United States) Charlotte Independence	Free
May 12, 2016	(Sierra Leone) Kei Kamara	Columbus Crew SC	New England Revolution	Trade
May 17, 2016	(Netherlands) Michael de Leeuw	(Netherlands) Groningen	Chicago Fire	Trade
May 17, 2016	(Panama) Cristian Martínez	(Panama) Chorrillo	Columbus Crew SC	Loan
May 23, 2016	(Sierra Leone) Michael Lahoud	(United States) New York Cosmos	Philadelphia Union	Loan end
May 24, 2016	(Sierra Leone) Michael Lahoud	Philadelphia Union	(United States) Miami FC	$300,000
June 24, 2016	(Canada) Karl Ouimette	New York Red Bulls	(United States) Jacksonville Armada	Loan
June 24, 2016	(United States) Alex Zendejas	FC Dallas	(Mexico) Guadalajara	$500,000
June 29, 2016	(Ghana) Kwadwo Poku	New York City FC	(United States) Miami FC	$750,000
June 29, 2016	(United States) Zach Steinberger	Houston Dynamo	(United States) Jacksonville Armada	Loan
June 30, 2016	(Ghana) Emmanuel Appiah	Colorado Rapids	Sporting Kansas City	Waived
June 30, 2016	(United States) Chris Froschauer	Colorado Rapids		Waived
June 30, 2016	(Colombia) Dairon Asprilla	Portland Timbers	(Colombia) Millonarios	Loan
July 5, 2016	(Switzerland) Adrian Winter	Orlando City SC	(Switzerland) FC Zürich	Undisclosed
July 6, 2016	(Republic of Ireland) Chris McCann	(England) Wigan Athletic	Atlanta United FC	Undisclosed
July 6, 2016	(Argentina) Leonel Miranda	Houston Dynamo	(Argentina) Club Atlético Independiente	Loan Return
July 6, 2016	(Spain) David Rocha	Houston Dynamo	(Spain) Real Oviedo	Waived
July 7, 2016	(Italy) Matteo Mancosu	(Italy) Bologna	Montreal Impact	Loan
July 9, 2016	(Brazil) Getterson	(Brazil) J. Malucelli	FC Dallas	Loan
July 10, 2016	(Denmark) Emil Larsen	Columbus Crew SC	(Denmark) Lyngby BK	Undisclosed
July 12, 2016	(Ghana) Lloyd Sam	New York Red Bulls	D.C. United	Trade
July 12, 2016	(United States) Cameron Porter	Montreal Impact	Sporting Kansas City	Trade
July 12, 2016	(United States) Amadou Dia	Sporting Kansas City	Montreal Impact	Trade
July 13, 2016	(Poland) Damien Perquis	Toronto FC	(England) Nottingham Forest	Mutual Contract Termination
July 14, 2016	(Lithuania) Vytautas Andriuskevicius	(Netherlands) SC Cambuur	Portland Timbers	Undisclosed
July 15, 2016	(Canada) Sam Adekugbe	Vancouver Whitecaps FC	(England) Brighton & Hove Albion	Loan
July 15, 2016	(Trinidad and Tobago) Kenwyne Jones	(Wales) Cardiff City	Atlanta United FC	Undisclosed
July 16, 2016	(Luxembourg) Maxime Chanot	(Belgium) K.V. Kortrijk	New York City FC	Undisclosed
July 18, 2016	(Ghana) Adam Larsen Kwarasey	Portland Timbers	(Norway) Rosenborg	Undisclosed
July 20, 2016	(Canada) Tosaint Ricketts	(Turkey) Boluspor	Toronto FC	Free
July 20, 2016	(Argentina) Fabián Espíndola	D.C. United	Vancouver Whitecaps FC	Trade
July 20, 2016	(United States) Patrick Mullins	New York City FC	D.C. United	Undisclosed
July 21, 2016	(Norway) Nicolai Næss	(Norway) Stabæk	Columbus Crew SC	Undisclosed
July 21, 2016	(Uruguay) Jose Aja	(Uruguay) Nacional	Orlando City SC	Loan
July 22, 2016	(Paraguay) Pedro Baez	(Paraguay) Cerro Porteno	Real Salt Lake	Loan
July 22, 2016	(Argentina) Héctor Villalba	(Argentina) San Lorenzo	Atlanta United FC	Undisclosed
July 22, 2016	(United States) Zack Steffen	(Germany) SC Freiburg	Columbus Crew SC	Undisclosed
July 23, 2016	(Argentina) Hernán Bernardello	(Spain) Alavés	Montreal Impact	Undisclosed
July 27, 2016	(Argentina) Fabián Espíndola	Vancouver Whitecaps FC	(Mexico) Club Necaxa	Undisclosed
July 27, 2016	(Uruguay) Nicolás Lodeiro	(Argentina) Boca Juniors	Seattle Sounders FC	Undisclosed
July 28, 2016	(Uruguay) Álvaro Fernández	(Argentina) Gimnasia	Seattle Sounders FC	Undisclosed
July 28, 2016	(United States) Chris Konopka	(Scotland) Ross County F.C.	Portland Timbers	Free
July 28, 2016	(Argentina) Héctor Villalba	Atlanta United FC	(Mexico) Club Tijuana	Loan
July 29, 2016	(Colombia) Yair Arboleda	(Colombia) Independiente Santa Fe	Houston Dynamo	Loan
July 29, 2016	(Nigeria) Kennedy Igboananike	Chicago Fire	D.C. United	Trade
July 30, 2016	(United States) Adam Jahn	San Jose Earthquakes	Columbus Crew SC	Trade
July 30, 2016	(Jamaica) Giles Barnes	Houston Dynamo	Vancouver Whitecaps FC	Trade
August 1, 2016	(England) Steven Taylor	(England) Newcastle United FC	Portland Timbers	Free
August 2, 2016	(Argentina) Norberto Paparatto	Portland Timbers	FC Dallas	Trade
August 2, 2016	(Nigeria) Gbenga Arokoyo	(Turkey) Gaziantepspor	Portland Timbers	Undisclosed
August 2, 2016	(Republic of Ireland) Chris McCann	Atlanta United FC	(England) Coventry City	Loan
August 3, 2016	(Austria) Daniel Royer	(Denmark) FC Midtjylland	New York Red Bulls	Undisclosed
August 3, 2016	(United States) Alejandro Bedoya	(France) Nantes	Philadelphia Union	Undisclosed
August 3, 2016	(France) Sebastien Le Toux	Philadelphia Union	Colorado Rapids	Trade
August 3, 2016	(Argentina) Luis Solignac	Colorado Rapids	Chicago Fire	Trade
August 3, 2016	(Costa Rica) Keyner Brown	(Costa Rica) Herediano	Houston Dynamo	Loan
August 3, 2016	(Armenia) David Arshakyan	(Lithuania) FK Trakai	Chicago Fire	Undisclosed
August 3, 2016	(Argentina) Matías Pérez García	San Jose Earthquakes	Orlando City SC	Trade
August 3, 2016	(El Salvador) Darwin Ceren	Orlando City SC	San Jose Earthquakes	Trade
August 3, 2016	(Honduras) José Escalante	Rio Grande Valley FC	Houston Dynamo	Loan
August 3, 2016	(Israel) Omer Damari	(Germany) RB Leipzig	New York Red Bulls	Loan
August 3, 2016	(United States) Charlie Davies	New England Revolution	Philadelphia Union	Trade
August 3, 2016	(Colombia) Fabian Castillo	FC Dallas	(Turkey) Trabzonspor	Loan
August 10, 2016	(United States) Auston Trusty	(United States) Bethlehem Steel FC	Philadelphia Union	Homegrown Player
August 10, 2016	(Eritrea) Henok Goitom	(Spain) Getafe CF	San Jose Earthquakes	Free
August 18, 2016	(Panama) Armando Cooper	(Panama) C.D. Árabe Unido	Toronto FC	Loan
August 18, 2016	(United States) Cody Cropper	(England) Southampton F.C.	New England Revolution	Free
August 19, 2016	(United States) Jack McBean	Los Angeles Galaxy	(England) Coventry City	Loan
September 3, 2016	(Mexico) Erick Torres	Houston Dynamo	(Mexico) Cruz Azul	Loan
September 15, 2016	(Guatemala) Carlos Ruiz	(Guatemala) C.S.D. Municipal	FC Dallas	Undisclosed

- ^1 Player officially joined his new club on January 1, 2016.
- ^2 Only rights to player were acquired.
- ^3 Player will officially join his new club on July 4, 2016.
