= 2016 Chicago Fire season =

Chicago Fire
2016 season
- Chairman: Andrew Hauptman
- Head coach: Veljko Paunović
- Stadium: Toyota Park (capacity: 20,000)
- MLS: Conference: 10th Overall: 20th
- MLS Cup Playoffs: Did not qualify
- U.S. Open Cup: Semifinals
- Brimstone Cup: Did not win
- Top goalscorer: League: David Accam (9); All: David Accam (14)
- Highest home attendance: 18,976 (Oct 16 vs New England Revolution)
- Lowest home attendance: League: 12,073 (Apr 2 vs Philadelphia); Open Cup: 3,666 (Jul 20 vs Fort Lauderdale)
- Average home league attendance: League: 15,602 (regular season); Open Cup: 5,133
- Biggest win: MTL 0-3 CHI (8/20); CHI 3-0 PHL (9/3)
- Biggest defeat: DC 6-2 CHI (8/27)
Home colors	Away colors	Third colors

The 2016 Chicago Fire season was the club's 18th year of existence, as well as their 19th season in Major League Soccer and their 19th consecutive year in the top-flight of American soccer.

On November 24, 2015 Veljko Paunović, coach of the 2015 World Cup champions Serbia U-20 team, was announced as the Chicago Fire's new head coach.

Chicago Fire began the regular season on March 6, 2016, with a home match against New York City FC. The Men in Red finished the regular season on October 23, 2016, with an away match against Toronto FC. The club has missed the playoffs for the sixth time in the past seven years.

The loss on the road to Vancouver Whitecaps on May 11, 2016, was the Fire's 28th straight match (19L, 9T) without a road win. This surpassed the New York Red Bulls for the longest road winless streak in MLS history. With the away loss to Real Salt Lake on August 6, 2016, the streak extended to 36 matches (27L, 9T). The two-years and 28 days long streak finally ended when the Fire defeated Montreal Impact, 3–0, on the road on August 20, 2016. It was the first victory away from home since the Fire beat the New England Revolution, 1–0, in Foxborough, MA on July 12, 2014.

Chicago Fire became the first team in MLS history to finish last in the overall table two years in a row.

== Squad at the end of the season ==
As of October 23, 2016. Source: Chicago Fire official roster

No.	Name	Nationality	Position	Date of birth (Aged)	Previous club
Goalkeepers
23	Patrick McLain	(United States)	GK	August 22, 1988 (aged 28)	(United States) Sacramento Republic FC
25	Sean Johnson	(United States)	GK	May 31, 1989 (aged 27)	(United States) Atlanta Blackhawks
28	Matt Lampson	(United States)	GK	September 6, 1989 (aged 27)	(United States) Columbus Crew
Defenders
3	Brandon Vincent	(United States)	D	May 1, 1994 (aged 22)	(United States) Stanford Cardinal
4	Johan Kappelhof	(Netherlands)	D	August 5, 1990 (aged 26)	(Netherlands) FC Groningen
5	Michael Harrington	(United States)	D	January 24, 1986 (aged 30)	(United States) Colorado Rapids
6	Eric Gehrig	(United States)	D	December 15, 1987 (aged 28)	(United States) Columbus Crew SC
13	Rodrigo Ramos	(Brazil)	D	May 24, 1995 (aged 21)	(Brazil) Coritiba
16	Jonathan Campbell	(United States)	D	June 27, 1993 (aged 23)	(United States) North Carolina Tar Heels
22	Patrick Doody	(United States)	D	April 22, 1992 (aged 24)	(United States) Indiana Hoosiers
66	João Meira	(Portugal)	D/M	April 30, 1987 (aged 29)	(Portugal) Belenenses
Midfielders
2	Matt Polster	(United States)	M	June 8, 1993 (aged 23)	(United States) SIU Edwardsville Cougars
7	John Goossens	(Netherlands)	M	July 25, 1988 (aged 28)	(Romania) FC Voluntari
12	Arturo Álvarez	(El Salvador)	M	June 28, 1985 (aged 31)	(Hungary) Videoton FC
15	Joey Calistri	(United States)	M	November 20, 1993 (aged 22)	(United States) Northwestern Wildcats
17	Collin Fernandez	(United States)	M	February 13, 1997 (aged 19)	(United States) Chicago Fire Juniors
18	Drew Conner	(United States)	M	February 18, 1994 (aged 22)	(United States) Wisconsin Badgers
19	Khaly Thiam	(Senegal)	M	January 7, 1994 (aged 22)	(Hungary) MTK Budapest
21	Nick LaBrocca	(United States)	M	December 4, 1984 (aged 31)	(United States) Colorado Rapids
26	Michael Stephens	(United States)	M	April 3, 1989 (aged 27)	(Norway) Stabæk
29	Alex Morrell	(United States)	M	May 11, 1994 (aged 22)	(United States) North Florida Ospreys
30	Răzvan Cociș	(Romania)	M	February 19, 1983 (aged 33)	(Ukraine) FC Hoverla Uzhhorod
Forwards
8	Michael de Leeuw	(Netherlands)	F	October 7, 1986 (aged 30)	(Netherlands) FC Groningen
9	Luis Solignac	(Argentina)	F	February 16, 1991 (aged 25)	(United States) Colorado Rapids
10	David Arshakyan	(Armenia)	F	August 16, 1994 (aged 22)	(Lithuania) FK Trakai
11	David Accam	(Ghana)	F/M	September 28, 1990 (aged 26)	(Sweden) Helsingborgs IF

== Player movement ==
=== In ===
Per Major League Soccer and club policies terms of the deals do not get disclosed.

Date	Player	Position	Previous club	Notes	Ref
November 30, 2015	(United States) Matt Polster	M	(United States) Chicago Fire	Exercised option	
November 30, 2015	(United States) Patrick Doody	D	(United States) Chicago Fire	Exercised option	
December 17, 2015	(United States) Joey Calistri	F	(United States) Chicago Fire Academy	Signed as a Homegrown Player	
December 17, 2015	(United States) Drew Conner	M	(United States) Chicago Fire Academy	Signed as a Homegrown Player	
January 14, 2016	(United States) Brandon Vincent	D	(United States) Stanford University	Drafted 4th overall (first round) in 2016 MLS SuperDraft, already signed contract with MLS	
January 14, 2016	(United States) Jonathan Campbell	D	(United States) University of North Carolina	Drafted 12th overall (first round) in 2016 MLS SuperDraft, already signed contract with MLS	
January 18, 2016	(United States) Michael Harrington	D	(United States) Colorado Rapids	Signed as a free agent	
January 18, 2016	(United States) Patrick McLain	GK	(United States) Sacramento Republic FC	Signed as a free agent	
January 23, 2016	(Romania) Răzvan Cociș	M	(United States) Chicago Fire	Re-signed with the club, after initially having his contract option declined; signed one-year deal with one year club option	
January 23, 2016	(Portugal) João Meira	D	(Portugal) Belenenses	Signed as a free agent, one-year deal with one year club option	
January 27, 2016	(United States) Nick LaBrocca	M	(United States) Colorado Rapids	Signed as a free agent, one-year deal with one year club option	
February 2, 2016	(Netherlands) Johan Kappelhof	D	(Netherlands) FC Groningen	Signed as a discovery signing using targeted allocation money	
February 26, 2016	(United States) Matt Lampson	GK	(United States) Columbus Crew	Signed as a free agent after trial, one-year deal with one year club option	
February 29, 2016	(Netherlands) John Goossens	M	(Romania) FC Voluntari	Signed after a trial, two-year deal with one year club option	
March 3, 2016	(El Salvador) Arturo Álvarez	M	(Hungary) Videoton FC	Signed after a trial, one-year deal with one year club option	
March 11, 2016	(United States) Alex Morrell	M	(United States) North Florida Ospreys	Signed to a one-year deal with three-year club option, after being selected 22nd overall (second round) in 2016 MLS SuperDraft	
May 17, 2016	(Netherlands) Michael de Leeuw	F	(Netherlands) FC Groningen	Signed as a discovery signing using targeted allocation money for a three-year deal through 2018 with a club option for 2019	
August 3, 2016	(Armenia) David Arshakyan	F	(Lithuania) FK Trakai	Signed as a Special Discovery Player, two-year deal with options for the third and fourth years	
August 3, 2016	(Argentina) Luis Solignac	F	(United States) Colorado Rapids	Acquired in exchange for General Allocation Money	

=== Out ===
Date	Player	Position	Destination Club	Notes	Ref
November 30, 2015	(Brazil) Adaílton	D	(United States) Miami FC	2016 contract option was declined, signed with Miami FC as a free agent on February 9	
November 30, 2015	(United States) Jon Busch	GK	(United States) Indy Eleven	2016 contract option was declined, signed with Indy Eleven as a free agent on January 22	
November 30, 2015	(United States) Greg Cochrane	D	(United States) San Antonio FC	2016 contract option was declined, signed with San Antonio FC as a free agent on February 25	
November 30, 2015	(Jamaica) Jason Johnson	F	(United States) San Antonio FC	2016 contract option was declined, signed with San Antonio FC as a free agent on February 16	
November 30, 2015	(United States) Alec Kann	GK	(United States) Sporting Kansas City	2016 contract option was declined, selected by Sporting Kansas City in the Re-Entry Draft	
November 30, 2015	(United States) Jeff Larentowicz	D	(United States) LA Galaxy	2016 contract option was declined, signed with LA Galaxy as a free agent on January 6	
November 30, 2015	(Jamaica) Lovel Palmer	D	(United States) Indy Eleven	2016 contract option was declined, signed with Indy Eleven on January 12	
November 30, 2015	(United States) Chris Ritter	M	None	2016 contract option was declined	
November 30, 2015	(Trinidad and Tobago) Daneil Cyrus	D	(Trinidad and Tobago) W Connection	Loan deal expired	
November 30, 2015	(United States) Ty Harden	D	None	Out of contract, eligible for free agency	
November 30, 2015	(United States) Mike Magee	F	(United States) LA Galaxy	Out of contract, signed with LA Galaxy as a free agent on January 14	
November 30, 2015	(England) Matt Watson	M	(United States) Carolina RailHawks	Out of contract, signed with Carolina RailHawks as a free agent on January 15	
January 6, 2016	(Ghana) Patrick Nyarko	F	(United States) D.C. United	Traded for second round pick in 2016 MLS SuperDraft	
January 14, 2016	(Trinidad and Tobago) Joevin Jones	D	(United States) Seattle Sounders FC	Traded in exchange for first round pick in 2016 MLS SuperDraft and allocation money	
February 13, 2016	(United States) Harry Shipp	M	(Canada) Montreal Impact	Traded for general allocation money and targeted allocation money, after initially having his option exercised on November 30, 2015	
March 2, 2016	(United States) Kingsley Bryce	M	None	Waived, after initially having his option exercised on November 30, 2015	
June 29, 2016	(Brazil) Gilberto	F	(Brazil) São Paulo FC	Mutual termination of contract; signed with São Paulo FC on July 15	
July 29, 2016	(Nigeria) Kennedy Igboananike	F	(United States) D.C. United	Traded for Targeted Allocation Money and the natural third round pick in the 2019 MLS SuperDraft	

- Players selected in 2016 MLS SuperDraft, but ultimately not signed: midfielder Jack Harrison (1st overall, first round, from Wake Forest University) - traded to New York City FC, midfielder Vincent Mitchell (62nd overall, fourth round, from Butler University) and defender/midfielder Vincent Keller (57th overall, third round, from Creighton University).
- Trialists released in the preseason: defender James Musa, midfielder Parker Maher (Saint Louis FC), goalkeeper Zach Bennett (winner of the Open Tryout), defender Benedikt Krug, defender Mauricio Pineda (Chicago Fire Academy), goalkeeper Callum Irving, goalkeeper Matt Bersano and midfielder Christian Volesky.

=== Loans ===
Per Major League Soccer and club policies terms of the deals do not get disclosed.

==== In ====
Date	Player	Position	Loaned from	Notes	Ref
February 3, 2016	(Brazil) Rodrigo Ramos	D	(Brazil) Coritiba	Acquired as a Discovery Signing on a one-year loan	
May 4, 2016	(Senegal) Khaly Thiam	M	(Hungary) MTK Budapest	Acquired on loan through the end of 2016	

== Technical staff ==
Position	Staff
General Manager	(United States) Nelson Rodríguez
Head Coach	(Serbia) Veljko Paunović
Assistant Coach	(Serbia) Marko Mitrović
Assistant Coach	(United States) Logan Pause
Goalkeeper Coach	(Serbia) Aleksandar Sarić
Strength and Conditioning Coach	Jordan Webb
Manager of Team and Soccer Operations	Alex Boler
Equipment Manager	Brian Sauer
Assistant Equipment Manager	Juan Arreola
Head Athletic Trainer	Mario Cruz
Assistant Athletic Trainer	Steve Purcell
Massage Therapist	Jake Bronowski, LMT
Chief Medical Officer	Dr. Joshua Blomgren, D.O.
Head Orthopedic Officer	Dr. Brian Forsythe, M.D.
Physical Therapist	Ryan Perry

Last updated: October 23, 2016
Source: Chicago Fire Technical Staff

== Standings ==
=== Eastern Conference table ===
Pos	Team	Pld	W	L	T	GF	GA	GD	Pts	Qualification
6	Philadelphia Union	34	11	14	9	52	55	−3	42	Qualification for the knockout round
7	New England Revolution	34	11	14	9	44	54	−10	42	
8	Orlando City SC	34	9	11	14	55	60	−5	41	
9	Columbus Crew SC	34	8	14	12	50	58	−8	36	
10	Chicago Fire	34	7	17	10	42	58	−16	31	

Source: MLS

=== Overall table ===
Pos	Team	Pld	W	L	T	GF	GA	GD	Pts
16	Vancouver Whitecaps FC	34	10	15	9	45	52	−7	39
17	San Jose Earthquakes	34	8	12	14	32	40	−8	38
18	Columbus Crew SC	34	8	14	12	50	58	−8	36
19	Houston Dynamo	34	7	14	13	39	45	−6	34
20	Chicago Fire	34	7	17	10	42	58	−16	31

Source: MLS
Rules for classification: 1) points; 2) total wins; 3) total goal differential; 4) total goals scored;

=== Results summary ===
Overall								Home						Away					
Pld	Pts	W	L	T	GF	GA	GD	W	L	T	GF	GA	GD	W	L	T	GF	GA	GD
34	31	7	17	10	42	58	−16	6	3	8	26	21	+5	1	14	2	16	37	−21

Last updated: October 23, 2016
Source: MLSsoccer.com standings
Pld = Matches played; Pts = Points; W = Matches won; T = Matches tied; L = Matches lost; GF = Goals for; GA = Goals against; GD = Goal difference

=== Results ===
Round	1	2	3	4	5	6	7	8	9	10	11	12	13	14	15	16	17	18	19	20	21	22	23	24	25	26	27	28	29	30	31	32	33	34
Stadium	H	A	H	H	A	H	H	A	A	A	H	H	A	A	H	A	H	A	A	H	A	H	A	H	A	H	H	H	A	A	A	H	H	A
Result	L	T	T	W	T	L	T	L	L	L	W	T	L	L	W	L	W	L	L	T	L	T	W	T	L	W	L	T	L	L	L	T	W	L

Updated to match(es) played on October 23, 2016. Source: MLS Results and Chicago Fire Schedule
A = Away; H = Home; W = Win; L = Loss; T = Tie

== Match results ==
Win Tie Loss

=== Preseason ===
Kickoff times are in CST (UTC-06)

February 6, 2016	University of South Florida	0–3	Chicago Fire	Tampa, Florida
16:00	Michael Bajza (yellow card) 44'	Report	Arturo Alvarez 28'; David Accam 33'; Vincent Mitchell 52'	Stadium: Corbett Stadium

February 11, 2016	Chicago Fire	4–2	Philadelphia Union	Clearwater, Florida
15:00	David Accam 14' (pen.), 40'; Nick LaBrocca 60'; Gilberto 64'	Report	Fabian Herbers 16'; Warren Creavalle 83'	Stadium: Joe DiMaggio Sports Complex

February 18, 2016	University of Portland	1–1	Chicago Fire	Portland, Oregon
	Eddie Sanchez 62'	Report	John Goossens 40'; Drew Conner (yellow card) 58'	Stadium: Merlo Field

Simple Invitational

Pos	Team	GP	W	L	D	GF	GA	GD	Pts
1	(United States) Chicago Fire	3	3	0	0	9	2	+7	9
2	(Canada) Vancouver Whitecaps FC	3	2	1	0	7	4	+3	6
3	(United States) Portland Timbers	3	1	2	0	4	4	0	3
4	(United States) Minnesota United FC	3	0	3	0	1	11	-10	0

February 21, 2016	Vancouver Whitecaps FC	2–3	Chicago Fire	Portland, Oregon
16:30	Johan Kappelhof 24' (o.g.); Deybi Flores (yellow card) 33'; Cristian Techera 38'; Kendall Waston (yellow card) 78'	Report	John Goossens 5'; Gilberto (yellow card) 36', (goal) 51' (pen.); Kennedy Igboananike 81' (pen.); Collin Fernandez (yellow card) 86'	Stadium: Providence Park

Wed., February 24, 2016	Chicago Fire	4–0	Minnesota United FC	Portland, Oregon
19:00	Joey Calistri 24', 35'; Matt Polster (yellow card) 42'; Patrick Doody (yellow card) 55'; Kingsley Bryce 62'; Arturo Álvarez 89' (pen.)	Report	Damian Lowe (yellow card) 75'	Stadium: Providence Park

February 27, 2016	Portland Timbers	0–2	Chicago Fire	Portland, Oregon
19:00	Zarek Valentin (yellow card) 21'; Jermaine Taylor (yellow card) 34'; Diego Chará (yellow card) 56'	Report	João Meira (yellow card) 4'; Arturo Álvarez 28'; Gilberto 35'; Matt Polster (yellow card) 81'; Kennedy Igboananike (yellow card) 82'	Stadium: Providence Park; Attendance: 16,134

=== Major League Soccer ===
Kickoff times are in CDT (UTC-05), unless posted otherwise

March 6, 2016 Match 1	Chicago Fire	3–4	New York City FC	Bridgeview, Illinois
13:00 CST (UTC-06)	Cocis 19'; Meira (yellow card) 32'; Igboananike 49'; Polster (yellow card) 62'; Accam 72' (pen.)	Report	McNamara 10'; Brillant (yellow card) 14'; Taylor 29', (yellow card) 59'; Shelton 36'; Diskerud 63'	Stadium: Toyota Park; Attendance: 17,768; Referee: Armando Villarreal

March 11, 2016 Match 2	Orlando City SC	1–1	Chicago Fire	Orlando, Florida
18:00 CST (UTC-06)	Larin 4'; Higuita (yellow card) 62'; Carrasco (yellow card) 75'; Shea (yellow card) 90'	Report	Accam 14', (yellow card) 83'; Polster (yellow card) 28'; Harrington (red card) 32'; Meira (yellow card) 71'	Stadium: Orlando Citrus Bowl; Attendance: 29,041; Referee: Ted Unkel

March 19, 2016 Match 3	Chicago Fire	0–0	Columbus Crew SC	Bridgeview, Illinois
16:00		Report	Meram (yellow card) 38'	Stadium: Toyota Park; Attendance: 12,605; Referee: Robert Sibiga

April 2, 2016 Match 4	Chicago Fire	1–0	Philadelphia Union	Bridgeview, Illinois
16:00	Ramos (yellow card) 37'; Igboananike 51'; Polster (yellow card) 72'	Report	Creavalle (yellow card) 13' (red card) 47'	Stadium: Toyota Park; Attendance: 12,073; Referee: Silviu Petrescu

April 10, 2016 Match 5	New York City FC	0–0	Chicago Fire	New York City, New York
18:00	Matarrita (yellow card) 54'	Report	LaBrocca (yellow card) 86'	Stadium: Yankee Stadium; Attendance: 22,930; Referee: Mark Geiger

April 16, 2016 Match 6	Chicago Fire	1–2	Montreal Impact	Bridgeview, Illinois
16:00	Igboananike 29'	Report	Drogba 56'; Piatti 90+1'	Stadium: Toyota Park; Attendance: 14,509; Referee: Kevin Stott

April 30, 2016 Match 7	Chicago Fire	1–1	D.C. United	Bridgeview, Illinois
16:00	Campbell 41'; Igboananike (yellow card) 44'	Report	Rolfe (yellow card) 45+1'; Nyarko 64'; Birnbaum (yellow card) 83'	Stadium: Toyota Park; Attendance: 13,114; Referee: Edvin Jurisevic

May 11, 2016 Match 8	Vancouver Whitecaps FC	2–1	Chicago Fire	Vancouver, British Columbia
21:00	Pérez 36', 89'; Watson (yellow card) 82'	Report	Igboananike 62'	Stadium: BC Place; Attendance: 19,638; Referee: Baldomero Toledo

May 14, 2016 Match 9	New England Revolution	2–0	Chicago Fire	Foxborough, Massachusetts
18:30	Nguyen 22'; Koffie (yellow card) 24'; Woodberry (yellow card) 57'; Agudelo (yellow card) 80'; Hollinger-Janzen 84'	Report	Álvarez (yellow card) 19'	Stadium: Gillette Stadium; Attendance: 18,997; Referee: Jorge Gonzalez

May 18, 2016 Match 10	New York Red Bulls	1–0	Chicago Fire	Harrison, New Jersey
18:30	Collin (yellow card) 29'; Grella 58'	Report	Meira (yellow card) 22'; Vincent (yellow card) 78'	Stadium: Red Bull Arena; Attendance: 16,624; Referee: Robert Sibiga

May 21, 2016 Match 11	Chicago Fire	1–0	Houston Dynamo	Bridgeview, Illinois
16:00	Álvarez 3'; Igboananike (yellow card) 56'; Polster (yellow card) 76'	Report	Horst (yellow card) 23'	Stadium: Toyota Park; Attendance: 15,363; Referee: Allen Chapman

May 28, 2016 Match 12	Chicago Fire	1–1	Portland Timbers	Bridgeview, Illinois
19:30	Accam 20'; Kappelhof (yellow card) 38'; Ramos (yellow card) 77'	Report	Valeri 18'; Ridgewell (yellow card) 69'; Klute (yellow card) 90+2'	Stadium: Toyota Park; Attendance: 14,729; Referee: Mathieu Bourdeau

June 18, 2016 Match 13	Colorado Rapids	2–1	Chicago Fire	Commerce City, Colorado
20:00	Doyle 57'; Pappa 89'; Burch (yellow card) 90+4'	Report	Ramos (yellow card) 67'; Calistri 81'	Stadium: Dick's Sporting Goods Park; Attendance: 18,103; Referee: Juan Guzman

June 22, 2016 Match 14	Philadelphia Union	4–3	Chicago Fire	Chester, Pennsylvania
18:00	Campbell 11' (o.g.); Alberg 15', 45+1', 56' (pen.), (yellow card) 58'; Carroll (yellow card) 36'; Tribbett (yellow card) 37'	Report	Accam 2'; Cocis 69'; Thiam 80'; Campbell (yellow card) 85'	Stadium: Talen Energy Stadium; Attendance: 16,667; Referee: Jaime Herrera

July 1, 2016 Match 15	Chicago Fire	1–0	San Jose Earthquakes	Bridgeview, Illinois
19:00	Stephens (yellow card) 53'; Goossens 58'; LaBrocca (yellow card) 90+3'	Report	Dawkins (yellow card) 10'; Francis (yellow card) 49'; Alashe (yellow card) 66'	Stadium: Toyota Park; Attendance: 16,487; Referee: Jose Carlos Rivero

July 9, 2016 Match 16	Toronto FC	1–0	Chicago Fire	Toronto, Ontario
18:30	Morrow 9'	Report		Stadium: BMO Field; Attendance: 27,934; Referee: Silviu Petrescu

July 13, 2016 Match 17	Chicago Fire	1–0	Sporting Kansas City	Bridgeview, Illinois
19:30	Leeuw 19'; Thiam (yellow card) 26'; Álvarez (yellow card) 68'; Meira (yellow card) 79'	Report	Mustivar (yellow card) 29'; Dwyer (yellow card) 71'; Medranda (yellow card) 85'	Stadium: Toyota Park; Attendance: 13,879; Referee: Nima Saghafi
Note: The kickoff was delayed by 1 hour and 48 minutes due to a thunderstorm.

July 16, 2016 Match 18	FC Dallas	3–1	Chicago Fire	Frisco, Texas
20:00	Urruti 23'; Díaz 41'; Rosales 90+2'	Report	Álvarez 90+1'	Stadium: Toyota Stadium; Attendance: 13,942; Referee: Baldomero Toledo

July 23, 2016 Match 19	New England Revolution	1–0	Chicago Fire	Foxborough, Massachusetts
18:30	Bunbury (yellow card) 77'; Watson 85'	Report	Leeuw (yellow card) 30'; Accam (yellow card) 90+1'	Stadium: Gillette Stadium; Attendance: 21,872; Referee: Juan Guzman

July 31, 2016 Match 20	Chicago Fire	2–2	New York Red Bulls	Bridgeview, Illinois
18:00	Accam 35'; Thiam (yellow card) 38'; Polster 45+2'; Cocis (yellow card) 76'	Report	Martins (yellow card) 15'; Polster 16' (o.g.); Grella (yellow card) 57'; Wright-Phillips 90'; Zubar (yellow card) 90+2'	Stadium: Toyota Park; Attendance: 17,221; Referee: Fotis Bazakos

August 6, 2016 Match 21	Real Salt Lake	3–1	Chicago Fire	Sandy, Utah
21:00	García 14', (yellow card) 15'; Morales 28' (pen.), 64'	Report	LaBrocca (yellow card) 35'; Álvarez 58'	Stadium: Rio Tinto Stadium; Attendance: 19,909; Referee: Silviu Petrescu

August 14, 2016 Match 22	Chicago Fire	2–2	Orlando City SC	Bridgeview, Illinois
15:00	Goossens 6'; Accam (yellow card) 45+2'; Cocis 78'	Report	Larin 9'; Redding (yellow card) 17'; Kaká 32'; Aja (yellow card) 86'	Stadium: Toyota Park; Attendance: 18,148; Referee: Mark Geiger

August 20, 2016 Match 23	Montreal Impact	0–3	Chicago Fire	Montreal, Quebec
19:30	Ciman (yellow card) 44'; Drogba (yellow card) 71'	Report	Solignac 15', (yellow card) 31'; Accam 73'; Polster 89'	Stadium: Saputo Stadium; Attendance: 20,801; Referee: David Gantar

August 24, 2016 Match 24	Chicago Fire	2–2	LA Galaxy	Bridgeview, Illinois
19:30	Álvarez 34'; Accam 39' (pen.), (yellow card) 90+3'	Report	Zardes 31'; Van Damme (yellow card) 38'; Santos 69'; Lletget (yellow card) 71'; Hušidić (yellow card) 76'	Stadium: Toyota Park; Attendance: 16,179; Referee: Jose Carlos Rivero

August 27, 2016 Match 25	D.C. United	6–2	Chicago Fire	Washington, D.C.
18:00	Jeffery (yellow card) 19'; Mullins 40', 45+1', 74'; Nyarko 51'; DeLeon 89'	Report	Leeuw 31', (yellow card) 47'; Thiam (red card) 34'; Kappelhof (yellow card) 36'; Cocis 45+2'	Stadium: RFK Stadium; Attendance: 15,720; Referee: Drew Fischer

September 3, 2016 Match 26	Chicago Fire	3–0	Philadelphia Union	Bridgeview, Illinois
19:30	Alberg 22' (o.g.); Meira (yellow card) 58'; Cocis (yellow card) 61'; Kappelhof (yellow card) 64'; Leeuw 71'; Álvarez 90'	Report		Stadium: Toyota Park; Attendance: 16,102; Referee: Ted Unkel

September 10, 2016 Match 27	Chicago Fire	1–2	Toronto FC	Bridgeview, Illinois
19:30	Michael de Leeuw 58'	Report	Altidore 33'; Osorio 52'	Stadium: Toyota Park; Attendance: 18,391; Referee: Marcos de Oliveira

September 16, 2016 Match 28	Chicago Fire	2–2	D.C. United	Bridgeview, Illinois
19:00	Cocis 22'; Accam 29'	Report	Vincent 19'; Boswell 90+2'	Stadium: Toyota Park; Attendance: 13,807; Referee: Kevin Stott

September 23, 2016 Match 29	New York City FC	4–1	Chicago Fire	New York City, New York
19:00	Mena 8'; Villa 9', 83'; Mendoza 44'; Brillant (yellow card) 72'	Report	Solignac 35'	Stadium: Yankee Stadium; Attendance: 25,011; Referee: Jaime Herrera

Wed., September 28, 2016 Match 30	Seattle Sounders FC	1–0	Chicago Fire	Seattle, Washington
21:30	Marshall 24'; Lodeiro (yellow card) 58'	Report	Cocis (yellow card) 75'	Stadium: CenturyLink Field; Attendance: 39,269; Referee: Hilario Grajeda

October 1, 2016 Match 31	Columbus Crew SC	3–0	Chicago Fire	Columbus, Ohio
18:30	Afful 8'; Meram 50'; Duka 59'	Report	Ramos (yellow card) 88'	Stadium: Mapfre Stadium; Attendance: 20,034; Referee: Alejandro Mariscal

October 13, 2016 Match 32	Chicago Fire	2–2	Columbus Crew SC	Bridgeview, Illinois
19:30	Parkhurst 53' (o.g.); Leeuw 57'; Cocis (yellow card) 80'; Meira (yellow card) 85'	Report	Jahn 13', 80'	Stadium: Toyota Park; Attendance: 15,883; Referee: David Gantar

October 16, 2016 Match 33	Chicago Fire	2–1	New England Revolution	Bridgeview, Illinois
14:00	Leeuw 9'; Thiam 44'; Solignac (red card) 54'; Accam 80'; Polster (yellow card) 90+2'	Report	Kamara (yellow card) 29'; Fagúndez 43'; Woodberry (yellow card) 51'; Knighton (red card) 73'	Stadium: Toyota Park; Attendance: 18,976; Referee: Baldomero Toledo

October 23, 2016 Match 34	Toronto FC	3–2	Chicago Fire	Toronto, Ontario
15:00	Giovinco 45' (pen.); Zavaleta (yellow card) 45+2'; Morrow 54'; Osorio 62'	Report	Leeuw 18'; Goossens 83'	Stadium: BMO Field; Attendance: 25,235; Referee: Fotis Bazakos

=== U.S. Open Cup ===
The Chicago Fire entered the 2016 U.S. Open Cup with the rest of Major League Soccer in the fourth round.
Kickoff times are in CDT (UTC-05)

June 15, 2016 Fourth round	Chicago Fire	1–1 (a.e.t.) (4–3 p)	Indy Eleven	Bridgeview, Illinois
19:30	Nick LaBrocca (yellow card) 87'; David Accam 111'	Report	Justin Braun (yellow card) 27', (goal) 105'; Nicki Paterson (yellow card) 72'; Souleymane Youla (yellow card) 90+2'; Nemanja Vuković (yellow card) 117'	Stadium: Toyota Park; Attendance: 5,543; Referee: Elvis Mahmutovic
	Penalties
	Igboananike (penalty missed); Thiam (penalty scored); Vincent (penalty scored); LaBrocca (penalty scored); Accam (penalty scored)		Paterson (penalty scored); Zayed (penalty scored); Vuković (penalty missed); Keller (penalty missed); Ubiparipović (penalty scored)

June 28, 2016 Round of 16	Chicago Fire	2–1	Columbus Crew SC	Bridgeview, Illinois
19:30	David Accam 7', 29'; Nick LaBrocca (yellow card) 53'; Rodrigo Ramos (yellow card) 66'	CHI Report; MLS Report	Ethan Finlay 79' (pen.); Tyson Wahl (yellow card) 90'	Stadium: Toyota Park; Attendance: 6,190; Referee: Nima Saghafi

July 20, 2016 Quarterfinals	Chicago Fire	3–0	Fort Lauderdale Strikers	Bridgeview, Illinois
19:30	David Accam 5' (pen.); Michael de Leeuw 35'; Khaly Thiam 51'	Report	Gale Agbossoumonde (yellow card) 30' (yellow-red card) 70'; Julius James (yellow card) 47'	Stadium: Toyota Park; Attendance: 3,666; Referee: Fotis Bazakos

August 9, 2016 Semifinals	New England Revolution	3–1	Chicago Fire	Foxborough, Massachusetts
19:00	Kei Kamara 16' (pen.); Je-Vaughn Watson 42', (yellow card) 51'; Teal Bunbury 85'; Kelyn Rowe (yellow card) 89'	Report	David Accam 40', (red card) 89'; Johan Kappelhof (yellow card) 43'; Michael de Leeuw (yellow card) 90+1'	Stadium: Gillette Stadium; Attendance: 9,801; Referee: Edvin Jurisevic

== Stats ==
=== Leading scorers ===
MLS Regular Season
Rank	Scorer	Goals	Assists
1	(Ghana) David Accam	9	5
2	(Netherlands) Michael de Leeuw	7	3
3	(El Salvador) Arturo Álvarez	5	9
4	(Romania) Răzvan Cociș	5	2
5	(Nigeria) Kennedy Igboananike	4	1
6	(Netherlands) John Goossens	3	4
7	(United States) Matt Polster	2	2
8	(Argentina) Luis Solignac	2	0
9	(United States) Joey Calistri	1	1
9	(United States) Jonathan Campbell	1	1
11	(Senegal) Khaly Thiam	1	0
12	(Brazil) Rodrigo Ramos	0	3
12	(United States) Brandon Vincent	0	3
13	(Brazil) Gilberto	0	2
13	(United States) Michael Stephens	0	2
16	(United States) Michael Harrington	0	1
16	(United States) Nick LaBrocca	0	1
16	(Portugal) João Meira	0	1

U.S. Open Cup
Rank	Scorer	Goals	Assists
1	(Ghana) David Accam	5	1
2	(Netherlands) Michael de Leeuw	1	1
3	(Senegal) Khaly Thiam	1	0
4	(Netherlands) John Goossens	0	1
4	(Brazil) Rodrigo Ramos	0	1
4	(United States) Nick LaBrocca	0	1

All Competitions
Rank	Scorer	Goals	Assists
1	(Ghana) David Accam	14	5
2	(El Salvador) Arturo Álvarez	5	5
3	(Netherlands) Michael de Leeuw	4	4
4	(Nigeria) Kennedy Igboananike	4	1
4	(Romania) Răzvan Cociș	4	1
6	(Netherlands) John Goossens	2	4
7	(United States) Matt Polster	2	1
8	(Senegal) Khaly Thiam	2	0
9	(United States) Joey Calistri	1	1
10	(United States) Jonathan Campbell	1	0
10	(Argentina) Luis Solignac	1	0
12	(Brazil) Rodrigo Ramos	0	4
13	(Brazil) Gilberto	0	2
13	(United States) Michael Stephens	0	2
13	(United States) Nick LaBrocca	0	2
13	(United States) Brandon Vincent	0	2
17	(Portugal) João Meira	0	1
17	(United States) Michael Harrington	0	1

Italics indicate player who departed the club during the season.
Updated to match played on October 23, 2016.
Source: MLSsoccer.com statistics - 2016 Chicago Fire

=== Appearances and goals ===
No.	Pos	Nat	Player	Total		MLS Regular season		MLS Cup Playoffs		U.S. Open Cup	
No.	Pos	Nat	Player	Apps	Goals	Apps	Goals	Apps	Goals	Apps	Goals
2	MF	(United States) USA	Matt Polster	17	1	12+2	1	0+0	0	2+1	0
3	DF	(United States) USA	Brandon Vincent	18	0	13+1	0	0+0	0	3+1	0
4	DF	(Netherlands) NED	Johan Kappelhof	25	0	19+2	0	0+0	0	3+1	0
5	DF	(United States) USA	Michael Harrington	16	0	14+1	0	0+0	0	1+0	0
6	DF	(United States) USA	Eric Gehrig	6	0	2+2	0	0+0	0	1+1	0
7	MF	(Netherlands) NED	John Goossens	15	1	8+5	1	0+0	0	2+0	0
8	MF	(Netherlands) NED	Michael de Leeuw	8	1	5+1	0	0+0	0	2+0	1
9	FW	(Argentina) ARG	Luis Solignac	1	0	1+0	0	0+0	0	0+0	0
11	FW	(Ghana) GHA	David Accam	17	10	12+1	5	0+0	0	4+0	5
12	MF	(El Salvador) ESA	Arturo Álvarez	21	3	15+3	3	0+0	0	3+0	0
13	DF	(Brazil) BRA	Rodrigo Ramos (on loan from Coritiba)	22	0	14+4	0	0+0	0	4+0	0
15	FW	(United States) USA	Joey Calistri	13	1	2+8	1	0+0	0	0+3	0
16	DF	(United States) USA	Jonathan Campbell	24	1	18+2	1	0+0	0	4+0	0
18	MF	(United States) USA	Drew Conner	0	0	0+0	0	0+0	0	0+0	0
19	MF	(Senegal) SEN	Khaly Thiam (on loan from MTK Budapest)	14	2	9+2	1	0+0	0	3+0	1
21	MF	(United States) USA	Nick LaBrocca	15	0	5+7	0	0+0	0	1+2	0
22	DF	(United States) USA	Patrick Doody	0	0	0+0	0	0+0	0	0+0	0
26	MF	(United States) USA	Michael Stephens	15	0	11+2	0	0+0	0	1+1	0
30	MF	(Romania) ROU	Răzvan Cociș	23	2	10+9	2	0+0	0	4+0	0
66	DF	(Portugal) POR	João Meira	17	0	14+2	0	0+0	0	0+1	0
Players currently out on loan with another club: (Statistics shown are the appearances made and goals scored while at Chicago Fire)
17	MF	(United States) USA	Collin Fernandez (on loan to Saint Louis FC)	2	0	0+2	0	0+0	0	0+0	0
29	FW	(United States) USA	Alex Morrell (on loan to Saint Louis FC)	4	0	0+4	0	0+0	0	0+0	0
Players who left the club during the season: (Statistics shown are the appearances made and goals scored while at Chicago Fire)
9	FW	(Brazil) BRA	Gilberto (mutually terminated contract)	9	0	8+1	0	0+0	0	0+0	0
77	FW	(Nigeria) NGR	Kennedy Igboananike (traded)	21	4	18+0	4	0+0	0	2+1	0

=== Goalkeeper stats ===
No.	Nat	Player	Total						Major League Soccer						U.S. Open Cup					
No.	Nat	Player	GS	GP	MIN	GA	GAA	W	GS	GP	MIN	GA	GAA	W	GS	GP	MIN	GA	GAA	W
23	(United States)	Patrick McLain	0	0	0	0	0.00	0	0	0	0	0	0.00	0	0	0	0	0	0.00	0
25	(United States)	Sean Johnson	22	22	1980	37	1.68	6	22	22	1980	37	1.68	6	0	0	0	0	0.00	0
28	(United States)	Matt Lampson	15	15	1380	22	1.43	4	11	11	990	18	1.64	1	4	4	390	4	0.92	3

Source: Chicago Fire goalkeeper stats

=== National team participation ===
Four Fire players have been called up to play for their senior national teams during this season.

Players	Team	Competition	Opponent	Date	Goals	Minutes	Ref
Brandon Vincent	United States	Friendly	Canada	February 5, 2016	0	45'	
Matt Polster	United States	Friendly	Canada	February 5, 2016	0	unused sub	
David Accam	Ghana	2017 Africa Cup of Nations qualification	Mozambique	March 24, 2016	0	0' (injury)	
David Accam	Ghana	2017 Africa Cup of Nations qualification	Mozambique	March 27, 2016	0	0' (injury)	
David Arshakyan	Armenia	Friendly	Czech Republic	August 31, 2016	0	unused sub	
David Accam	Ghana	2017 Africa Cup of Nations qualification	Rwanda	September 3, 2016	0	Earned a start	
David Arshakyan	Armenia	2018 FIFA World Cup qualification	Denmark	September 4, 2016	0	70'	
David Accam	Ghana	Friendly	Russia	September 6, 2016	0	12'	

== Recognition ==
=== MLS Goal of the Week ===
Week	Player	Report
24	(Argentina) Luis Solignac	GOTW

=== MLS Team of the Week ===
Week	Player	Position	Report
5	(Netherlands) Johan Kappelhof	D	Report
17	(Brazil) Rodrigo Ramos	D	Report
24	(Ghana) David Accam	F	Report
26	(United States) Sean Johnson	GK	Report
26	(Portugal) João Meira	D	Report
26	(Netherlands) Michael de Leeuw	F	Report

=== MLS All-Star Game ===
Position	Player	Report
Defender	(United States) Brandon Vincent	Report

=== MLS 24 under 24 ===
Chicago Fire midfielder Matt Polster was selected to Major League Soccer's "24 under 24" list, an annual ranking of the top players in the league under the age of 24.

=== Team annual awards ===
Forward/midfielder David Accam was named the team's Most Valuable Player and Golden Boot winner for the second year in a row in both categories. In 24 league matches Accam scored nine goals and had five assists. Accam also had team-high 14 goals across all competitions of the season.

In his first year with the club Johan Kappelhof was named the Defensive Player of the Year. Tied with Jonathan Campbell for a team-high 33 league appearances, Kappelhof made 85 clearances, 17 blocks and 113 interceptions during his first MLS campaign.

Goalkeeper Sean Johnson was chosen Section 8 Chicago Supporters' Player of the Year.

== Kits ==
Home	Away

Type	Shirt	Shorts	Socks	First appearance / Info
Home	Red	Red	Red	
Away	White	White	White	

=== Primary kit ===
The new primary kit for 2016 season was officially unveiled on January 25, 2016. The jersey features an all-red design with the return of the iconic white bar across the chest. The Chicago city flag embossed on the lower front for the jersey's jock tag.

=== Secondary kit ===
According to the league's bi-annual rotation of kits the secondary kit carried over from the previous season. It was originally unveiled on March 2, 2015. The design and details were inspired by the City of Chicago flag.

== Draft pick trades ==
Picks acquired:

- 2016 MLS SuperDraft second round pick from D.C. United in exchange for forward Patrick Nyarko.
- 2016 MLS SuperDraft third round pick from New York Red Bulls in exchange for goalkeeper Kyle Reynish.
- 2017 MLS SuperDraft natural first round pick from Philadelphia Union in exchange for the top spot in the MLS Allocation Ranking Order.
- 2019 MLS SuperDraft natural third round pick from D.C. United in exchange for forward Kennedy Igboananike.

Picks traded:

- 2016 MLS SuperDraft conditional pick to Los Angeles Galaxy in exchange for Greg Cochrane.
- 2016 MLS SuperDraft natural second round pick to Orlando City SC in exchange for Eric Gehrig.
- 2017 MLS SuperDraft natural second round pick to Columbus Crew SC in exchange for the Discovery Priority on Khaly Thiam (however, pursuant to the trade agreement, if Thiam starts in 12 or more 2016 MLS regular season games, or if his loan is extended or successfully converted into a transfer following the 2016 season, Columbus will receive General Allocation Money instead of the SuperDraft pick).
