= 2016 Major League Soccer season =

21st season of Major League Soccer

Major League Soccer
- Season: 2016
- Teams: 20
- MLS Cup: Seattle Sounders FC (1st title)
- Supporters' Shield: FC Dallas (1st shield)
- Champions League (United States): Colorado Rapids; FC Dallas; New York Red Bulls; Seattle Sounders FC
- Champions League (Canada): Toronto FC
- Matches: 340
- Goals: 956 (2.81 per match)
- Top goalscorer: Bradley Wright-Phillips (24 goals)
- Best goalkeeper: Luis Robles (11 shutouts)
- Biggest home win: 5 goals: HOU 5–0 DAL (Mar 12); SEA 5–0 DAL (Jul 13); DC 6–1 CHI (August 27)
- Biggest away win: 7 goals: NYC 0–7 NY (May 21)
- Highest scoring: 8 goals: CLB 4–4 MTL (May 7); DC 6–2 CHI (Aug 27)
- Longest winning run: 4 games: New York Red Bulls (May 18 – Jun 19); New York City FC (Jun 18 – Jul 6); LA Galaxy (Jul 4 – Jul 23); Toronto FC (Jul 23 – Aug 6); Seattle Sounders FC (Sep 17 – Oct 2); D.C. United (Sep 24 – Oct 16); New York Red Bulls (Sep 24 – Oct 23); Toronto FC (Oct 23 – Nov 6); Montreal Impact (Oct 27 – Nov 22)
- Longest unbeaten run: 16 games: New York Red Bulls (Jul 10 – Oct 23)
- Longest winless run: 10 games: Columbus Crew SC (Jun 1 – Aug 13)
- Longest losing run: 4 games: New York Red Bulls (Apr 1 – Apr 16); New England Revolution (Jul 31 – Aug 20); Vancouver Whitecaps FC (Jul 31 – Aug 20); Philadelphia Union (Oct 1 – Oct 26)
- Highest attendance: 60,147; ORL 2–2 RSL (Mar 6)
- Lowest attendance: 10,144; NE 1–1 POR (Apr 27)
- Total attendance: 7,345,265
- Average attendance: 21,692

The 2016 Major League Soccer season featured 20 total clubs (17 based in the United States, 3 based in Canada). The regular season began on March 6 and ended on October 23. The playoffs began on October 26 and ended on December 10. The defending MLS Cup champions were the Portland Timbers, while the New York Red Bulls were the defending Supporters' Shield winners. FC Dallas won the Supporter's Shield for the first time, and the Seattle Sounders FC won their first MLS Cup in their history after defeating Toronto FC 5–4 in a penalty kick shootout, after playing to a 0–0 result after regulation and added extra time.

== Teams ==
=== Stadiums and locations ===
Western Conference
Team	Stadium	Capacity
Colorado Rapids	Dick's Sporting Goods Park	17,424
FC Dallas	Toyota Stadium	20,500
Houston Dynamo	BBVA Compass Stadium	22,039
LA Galaxy	StubHub Center	27,000
Portland Timbers	Providence Park	21,144
Real Salt Lake	Rio Tinto Stadium	20,213
San Jose Earthquakes	Avaya Stadium	18,000
Seattle Sounders FC	CenturyLink Field	40,000
Sporting Kansas City	Children's Mercy Park	18,467
Vancouver Whitecaps FC	BC Place	22,500

Eastern Conference
Team	Stadium	Capacity
Chicago Fire	Toyota Park	20,000
Columbus Crew SC	Mapfre Stadium	20,145
D.C. United	RFK Stadium	20,000
Montreal Impact	Saputo Stadium	20,801
New England Revolution	Gillette Stadium	20,000
New York City FC	Yankee Stadium	30,000
New York Red Bulls	Red Bull Arena	25,000
Orlando City SC	Camping World Stadium	33,500
Philadelphia Union	Talen Energy Stadium	18,500
Toronto FC	BMO Field	30,991

Locations of teams for the 2016 Major League Soccer season
Western Conference Eastern Conference

1. Non-soccer specific stadium and artificially reduced capacity.

=== Personnel and sponsorship ===
Note: All teams use Adidas as kit manufacturer.

Team	Head coach	Captain	Shirt sponsor
Chicago Fire	(Serbia) Veljko Paunović	(Romania) Răzvan Cociș	Valspar
Colorado Rapids	(United States) Pablo Mastroeni	(United States) Sam Cronin	Transamerica
Columbus Crew SC	(United States) Gregg Berhalter	(United States) Michael Parkhurst	Barbasol
D.C. United	(United States) Ben Olsen	(United States) Bobby Boswell	Leidos
FC Dallas	(Colombia) Óscar Pareja	(United States) Matt Hedges	AdvoCare
Houston Dynamo	(United States) Wade Barrett (interim)	(United States) DaMarcus Beasley	BHP Billiton
LA Galaxy	(United States) Bruce Arena	(Republic of Ireland) Robbie Keane	Herbalife
Montreal Impact	(Canada) Mauro Biello	(Canada) Patrice Bernier	Bank of Montreal
New England Revolution	(United States) Jay Heaps	(United States) Lee Nguyen	UnitedHealthcare
New York City FC	(France) Patrick Vieira	(Spain) David Villa	Etihad Airways
New York Red Bulls	(United States) Jesse Marsch	(United States) Dax McCarty	Red Bull
Orlando City SC	(United States) Jason Kreis	(Brazil) Kaká	Orlando Health
Philadelphia Union	(United States) Jim Curtin	(United States) Brian Carroll	Bimbo
Portland Timbers	(United States) Caleb Porter	(England) Liam Ridgewell	Alaska Airlines
Real Salt Lake	(United States) Jeff Cassar	(United States) Kyle Beckerman	LifeVantage
San Jose Earthquakes	(United States) Dominic Kinnear	(United States) Chris Wondolowski	Sutter Health
Seattle Sounders FC	(United States) Brian Schmetzer (interim)	(United States) Brad Evans	Xbox
Sporting Kansas City	(United States) Peter Vermes	(United States) Matt Besler	Ivy Funds
Toronto FC	(United States) Greg Vanney	(United States) Michael Bradley	Bank of Montreal
Vancouver Whitecaps FC	(Wales) Carl Robinson	(Chile) Pedro Morales	Bell Canada

=== Managerial changes ===
Team	Outgoing manager	Manner of departure	Date of vacancy	Position in table	Incoming manager	Date of appointment
New York City	(United States) Jason Kreis	Fired	November 2, 2015	Preseason	(France) Patrick Vieira	November 9, 2015
Chicago Fire	(United States) Brian Bliss (interim)	End of interim period	November 24, 2015	Preseason	(Serbia) Veljko Paunovic	November 24, 2015
Houston Dynamo	(Republic of Ireland) Owen Coyle	Mutual consent	May 25, 2016	10th in West, 18th overall	(United States) Wade Barrett (interim)	June 7, 2016
Orlando City SC	(England) Adrian Heath	Mutual consent	July 6, 2016	7th in East, 15th overall	(United States) Bobby Murphy (interim)	July 7, 2016
Orlando City SC	(United States) Bobby Murphy (interim)	End of interim period	July 19, 2016	8th in East, 16th overall	(United States) Jason Kreis	July 19, 2016
Seattle Sounders FC	(United States) Sigi Schmid	Mutual consent	July 26, 2016	9th in West, 17th overall	(United States) Brian Schmetzer (interim)	July 26, 2016

== Regular season ==
=== Eastern Conference ===
Pos	Team	Pld	W	L	T	GF	GA	GD	Pts	Qualification
1	New York Red Bulls	34	16	9	9	61	44	+17	57	Qualification for the conference semifinals
2	New York City FC	34	15	10	9	62	57	+5	54	Qualification for the conference semifinals
3	Toronto FC	34	14	9	11	51	39	+12	53	Qualification for the knockout round
4	D.C. United	34	11	10	13	53	47	+6	46	Qualification for the knockout round
5	Montreal Impact	34	11	11	12	49	53	−4	45	Qualification for the knockout round
6	Philadelphia Union	34	11	14	9	52	55	−3	42	Qualification for the knockout round
7	New England Revolution	34	11	14	9	44	54	−10	42	
8	Orlando City SC	34	9	11	14	55	60	−5	41	
9	Columbus Crew SC	34	8	14	12	50	58	−8	36	
10	Chicago Fire	34	7	17	10	42	58	−16	31	

Source: MLS

=== Western Conference ===
Pos	Team	Pld	W	L	T	GF	GA	GD	Pts	Qualification
1	FC Dallas	34	17	8	9	50	40	+10	60	Qualification for the conference semifinals
2	Colorado Rapids	34	15	6	13	39	32	+7	58	Qualification for the conference semifinals
3	LA Galaxy	34	12	6	16	54	39	+15	52	Qualification for the knockout round
4	Seattle Sounders FC	34	14	14	6	44	43	+1	48	Qualification for the knockout round
5	Sporting Kansas City	34	13	13	8	42	41	+1	47	Qualification for the knockout round
6	Real Salt Lake	34	12	12	10	44	46	−2	46	Qualification for the knockout round
7	Portland Timbers	34	12	14	8	48	53	−5	44	
8	Vancouver Whitecaps FC	34	10	15	9	45	52	−7	39	
9	San Jose Earthquakes	34	8	12	14	32	40	−8	38	
10	Houston Dynamo	34	7	14	13	39	45	−6	34	

Source: MLS

=== Overall standings ===
Pos	Team	Pld	W	L	T	GF	GA	GD	Pts	Qualification
1	FC Dallas (S, U)	34	17	8	9	50	40	+10	60	Qualification for the CONCACAF Champions League
2	Colorado Rapids	34	15	6	13	39	32	+7	58	Qualification for the CONCACAF Champions League
3	New York Red Bulls	34	16	9	9	61	44	+17	57	Qualification for the CONCACAF Champions League
4	New York City FC	34	15	10	9	62	57	+5	54	
5	Toronto FC (V)	34	14	9	11	51	39	+12	53	Qualification for the CONCACAF Champions League
6	LA Galaxy	34	12	6	16	54	39	+15	52	
7	Seattle Sounders FC (C)	34	14	14	6	44	43	+1	48	Qualification for the CONCACAF Champions League
8	Sporting Kansas City	34	13	13	8	42	41	+1	47	
9	Real Salt Lake	34	12	12	10	44	46	−2	46	
10	D.C. United	34	11	10	13	53	47	+6	46	
11	Montreal Impact	34	11	11	12	49	53	−4	45	
12	Portland Timbers	34	12	14	8	48	53	−5	44	
13	Philadelphia Union	34	11	14	9	52	55	−3	42	
14	New England Revolution	34	11	14	9	44	54	−10	42	
15	Orlando City SC	34	9	11	14	55	60	−5	41	
16	Vancouver Whitecaps FC	34	10	15	9	45	52	−7	39	
17	San Jose Earthquakes	34	8	12	14	32	40	−8	38	
18	Columbus Crew SC	34	8	14	12	50	58	−8	36	
19	Houston Dynamo	34	7	14	13	39	45	−6	34	
20	Chicago Fire	34	7	17	10	42	58	−16	31	

Source: MLS
Rules for classification: 1) points; 2) total wins; 3) total goal differential; 4) total goals scored;
(C) MLS Cup champions; (S) Supporters' Shield winners; (U) U.S. Open Cup winners; (V) Canadian Championship winners

== MLS Cup playoffs ==
=== Bracket ===
Knockout round	Conference semifinals
E5	Montreal Impact	1	2	3
October 27 – Washington, D.C.
E1	New York Red Bulls	0	1	1
E4	D.C. United	2
E5	Montreal Impact	4
Eastern Conference
E3	Toronto FC	2	5	7
October 26 – Toronto, Ontario
E2	New York City FC	0	0	0
E3	Toronto FC	3
E6	Philadelphia Union	1
W4	Seattle Sounders FC	3	1	4
October 27 – Seattle, Washington
W1	FC Dallas	0	2	2
W4	Seattle Sounders FC	1
W5	Sporting Kansas City	0
Western Conference
W3	LA Galaxy	1	0	1 (1)
October 26 – Carson, California
W2	Colorado Rapids (p)	0	1	1 (3)
W3	LA Galaxy	3
W6	Real Salt Lake	1

Conference finals
E5	Montreal Impact	3	2	5
E3	Toronto FC (a.e.t.)	2	5	7
W4	Seattle Sounders FC	2	1	3
W2	Colorado Rapids	1	0	1

MLS Cup; December 10 – Toronto, Ontario
E3	Toronto FC	0 (4)
W4	Seattle Sounders FC (p)	0 (5)

=== MLS Cup ===
December 10, 2016
8:00 p.m. EST

Toronto FC	0–0 (a.e.t.)	Seattle Sounders FC
	Report
Penalties
Altidore (penalty scored); Bradley (penalty missed); Cheyrou (penalty scored); Johnson (penalty scored); Moor (penalty scored); Morrow (penalty missed)	4–5	(penalty scored) Evans; (penalty scored) Ivanschitz; (penalty missed) Fernández; (penalty scored) J. Jones; (penalty scored) Lodeiro; (penalty scored) Torres

BMO Field, Toronto, Ontario
Attendance: 36,045
Referee: Alan Kelly

== Attendance ==
=== Average home attendances ===
Ranked from highest to lowest average attendance.

As of October 24, 2016

Pos.	Team	GP	Cumulative	High	Low	Mean
1	Seattle Sounders FC	17	724,809	53,302	39,269	42,636
2	Orlando City SC	17	502,478	60,147	23,802	31,324
3	New York City FC	17	462,336	37,858	22,736	27,196
4	Toronto FC	17	451,917	30,262	22,212	26,583
5	LA Galaxy	17	427,492	27,167	19,651	25,147
6	Vancouver Whitecaps FC	17	379,603	27,038	18,836	22,330
7	Portland Timbers	17	359,448	21,144	21,144	21,144
8	Montreal Impact	17	351,366	27,545	16,318	20,669
9	New York Red Bulls	17	350,535	25,218	15,167	20,620
10	New England Revolution	17	343,150	39,587	10,144	20,185
11	San Jose Earthquakes	17	338,816	50,816	18,000	19,930
12	Real Salt Lake	17	335,909	20,389	18,036	19,759
13	Sporting Kansas City	17	333,155	20,618	18,563	19,549
14	Houston Dynamo	17	323,361	21,601	15,045	19,597
15	Philadelphia Union	17	297,825	18,681	15,011	17,519
16	Columbus Crew SC	17	291,128	20,389	13,114	17,125
17	D.C. United	17	290,381	30,943	12,094	17,081
18	Colorado Rapids	17	276,721	18,759	10,670	16,278
19	Chicago Fire	17	265,234	18,976	12,073	15,602
20	FC Dallas	17	239,601	16,215	10,381	14,094
–	Total	340	7,375,144	60,147	10,144	21,692

1. Non-soccer specific stadium and artificially reduced capacity.

=== Highest attendances ===
Regular season

As of October 24, 2016

Rank	Home team	Score	Away team	Attendance	Date	Week	Stadium
1	Orlando City SC	2–2	Real Salt Lake	60,147	March 6, 2016	1	Orlando Citrus Bowl
2	Seattle Sounders FC	3–1	Portland Timbers	53,302	August 21, 2016	25	CenturyLink Field
3	San Jose Earthquakes	1–1	Los Angeles Galaxy	50,816	June 25, 2016	15	Stanford Stadium
4	Seattle Sounders FC	2–1	Real Salt Lake	50,022	October 23, 2016	34	CenturyLink Field
5	Seattle Sounders FC	1–1	Los Angeles Galaxy	48,458	July 31, 2016	22	CenturyLink Field
6	Seattle Sounders FC	0–2	New York City FC	47,537	June 25, 2016	15	CenturyLink Field
7	Seattle Sounders FC	1–0	Vancouver Whitecaps FC	47,111	September 17, 2016	30	CenturyLink Field
8	Seattle Sounders FC	0–1	Colorado Rapids	41,028	May 21, 2016	11	CenturyLink Field
9	Seattle Sounders FC	0–1	Los Angeles Galaxy	40,813	July 9, 2016	18	CenturyLink Field
10	Seattle Sounders FC	5–0	FC Dallas	40,101	July 13, 2016	19	CenturyLink Field

== Player statistics ==
=== Goals ===
Rank	Player	Club	Goals
1	(England) Bradley Wright-Phillips	New York Red Bulls	25
2	(Spain) David Villa	New York City FC	24
3	(Italy) Sebastian Giovinco	Toronto FC	17
3	(Argentina) Ignacio Piatti	Montreal Impact	17
5	(Nigeria) Fanendo Adi	Portland Timbers	16
5	(United States) Dom Dwyer	Sporting Kansas City	16
5	(Norway) Ola Kamara	Columbus Crew	16
8	(Mexico) Giovani Dos Santos	LA Galaxy	14
8	(Canada) Cyle Larin	Orlando City SC	14
8	(Argentina) Diego Valeri	Portland Timbers	14

=== Hat-tricks ===
Player	Club	Against	Result	Date
(England) Bradley Wright-Phillips	New York Red Bulls	Toronto FC	3–0	May 28
(Norway) Ola Kamara	Columbus Crew SC	Real Salt Lake	4–3	May 28
(Netherlands) Roland Alberg	Philadelphia Union	Chicago Fire	4–3	June 22
(Ivory Coast) Didier Drogba	Montreal Impact	Philadelphia Union	5–1	July 23
(Italy) Sebastian Giovinco	Toronto FC	D.C. United	4–1	July 23
(England) Frank Lampard	New York City FC	Colorado Rapids	5–1	July 30
(Italy) Sebastian Giovinco	Toronto FC	New England Revolution	4–1	August 6
(United States) Clint Dempsey	Seattle Sounders FC	Orlando City SC	3–1	August 7
(United States) Patrick Mullins	D.C. United	Chicago Fire	6–2	August 27
(Colombia) Mauro Manotas	Houston Dynamo	Portland Timbers	3–1	September 24
(Italy) Sebastian Giovinco	Toronto FC	New York City FC	5–0	November 6

=== Assists ===
Rank	Player	Club	Assists
1	(United States) Sacha Kljestan	New York Red Bulls	20
2	(Italy) Sebastian Giovinco	Toronto FC	15
3	(Argentina) Mauro Díaz	FC Dallas	13
3	(United States) Benny Feilhaber	Sporting Kansas City	13
3	(Iraq) Justin Meram	Columbus Crew	13
6	(Mexico) Giovani Dos Santos	LA Galaxy	12
7	(Argentina) Luciano Acosta	D.C. United	11
7	(England) Steven Gerrard	LA Galaxy	11
7	(Italy) Andrea Pirlo	New York City FC	11
7	(Ecuador) Joao Plata	Real Salt Lake	11

=== Clean Sheets ===
Rank	Player	Club	Clean Sheets
1	(United States) Luis Robles	New York Red Bulls	11
2	(United States) Chris Seitz	FC Dallas	10
3	(United States) Brian Rowe	LA Galaxy	9
4	(United States) David Bingham	San Jose Earthquakes	8
4	(United States) Steve Clark	Columbus Crew SC	8
4	(Switzerland) Stefan Frei	Seattle Sounders FC	8
4	(United States) Tim Melia	Sporting Kansas City	8
4	(Puerto Rico) Josh Saunders	New York City FC	8
9	(United States) Tim Howard	Colorado Rapids	7
10	7 players		6

== Awards ==
=== Player of the Month ===
Month	Player	Club	Stats
March	(Ecuador) Joao Plata	Real Salt Lake	3G, 2A
April	(Nigeria) Fanendo Adi	Portland Timbers	3G, 1A
May	(England) Bradley Wright-Phillips	New York Red Bulls	6G, 2A
June	(Armenia) Yura Movsisyan	Real Salt Lake	3G
July	(England) Frank Lampard	New York City FC	6G, 1A
August	(Uruguay) Nicolás Lodeiro	Seattle Sounders FC	2G, 6A
September	(United States) Chad Marshall	Seattle Sounders FC	1G
October	(Iraq) Justin Meram	Columbus Crew	1G, 4A

=== Weekly awards ===
Week	MLS Player of the Week		MLS Goal of the Week		MLS Save of the Week	
Week	Player	Club	Player	Club	Player	Club
1	(United States) Mike Magee	LA Galaxy	(Argentina) Ignacio Piatti	Montreal Impact	(United States) Evan Bush	Montreal Impact
2	(United States) Andrew Wenger	Houston Dynamo	(Canada) Cyle Larin	Orlando City SC	(United States) Brian Rowe	LA Galaxy
3	(Brazil) Felipe	New York Red Bulls	(Brazil) Felipe	New York Red Bulls	(United States) Tim Melia	Sporting Kansas City
4	(Colombia) Michael Barrios	FC Dallas	(United States) Thomas McNamara	New York City FC	(United States) Bobby Shuttleworth	New England Revolution
5	(Brazil) Kaká	Orlando City SC	(United States) Adam Jahn	San Jose Earthquakes	(United States) Joe Bendik	Orlando City SC
6	(Argentina) Fabián Espíndola	D.C. United	(Panama) Alberto Quintero	San Jose Earthquakes	(United States) David Bingham	San Jose Earthquakes
7	(Mexico) Giovani dos Santos	LA Galaxy	(Argentina) Ignacio Piatti	Montreal Impact	(United States) Nick Rimando	Real Salt Lake
8	(Ghana) Emmanuel Boateng	LA Galaxy	(Argentina) Luciano Acosta	D.C. United	(United States) David Bingham	San Jose Earthquakes
9	(New Zealand) Jake Gleeson	Portland Timbers	(Canada) Maxim Tissot	Montreal Impact	(United States) Joe Bendik	Orlando City SC
10	(Argentina) Ignacio Piatti	Montreal Impact	(Argentina) Ignacio Piatti	Montreal Impact	(United States) Tim Melia	Sporting Kansas City
11	(The Gambia) Kekuta Manneh	Vancouver Whitecaps FC	(Panama) Blas Perez	Vancouver Whitecaps FC	(United States) Joe Bendik	Orlando City SC
12	(England) Bradley Wright-Phillips	New York Red Bulls	(Canada) Cyle Larin	Orlando City SC	(United States) Joe Bendik	Orlando City SC
13	(Norway) Ola Kamara	Columbus Crew SC	(Trinidad and Tobago) Kevin Molino	Orlando City SC	(United States) Luis Robles	New York Red Bulls
14	(United States) Chris Pontius	Philadelphia Union	(United States) Chris Pontius	Philadelphia Union	(United States) Nick Rimando	Real Salt Lake
15	(United States) Mike Grella	New York Red Bulls	(Brazil) Júlio Baptista	Orlando City SC	(New Zealand) Jake Gleeson	Portland Timbers
16	(Netherlands) Roland Alberg	Philadelphia Union	(United States) Lamar Neagle	D.C. United	(Jamaica) Andre Blake	Philadelphia Union
17	(England) Jack Harrison	New York City FC	(Argentina) Cristian Maidana	Houston Dynamo	(United States) Joe Bendik	Orlando City SC
18	(Brazil) Ilsinho	Philadelphia Union	(United States) Lee Nguyen	New England Revolution	(United States) Brian Rowe	LA Galaxy
19	(Argentina) Diego Valeri	Portland Timbers	(England) Jack Harrison	New York City FC	(United States) Joe Bendik	Orlando City SC
20	(Italy) Sebastian Giovinco	Toronto FC	(Argentina) Ignacio Piatti	Montreal Impact	(United States) Joe Bendik	Orlando City SC
21	(England) Frank Lampard	New York City FC	(Canada) Cyle Larin	Orlando City SC	(United States) Joe Bendik	Orlando City SC
22	(Italy) Sebastian Giovinco	Toronto FC	(Argentina) Javier Morales	Real Salt Lake	(United States) Joe Bendik	Orlando City SC
23	(England) Bradley Wright-Phillips	New York Red Bulls	(Albania) Shkelzen Gashi	Colorado Rapids	(United States) Bill Hamid	D.C. United
24	(United States) Clint Dempsey	Seattle Sounders FC	(Argentina) Luis Solignac	Chicago Fire SC	(United States) Joe Willis	Houston Dynamo
25	(United States) Patrick Mullins	D.C. United	(Armenia) Yura Movsisyan	Real Salt Lake	(United States) Joe Bendik	Orlando City SC
26	(England) Frank Lampard	New York City FC	(Mexico) Giovani dos Santos	LA Galaxy	(United States) Brad Knighton	New England Revolution
27	(Mexico) Giovani dos Santos	LA Galaxy	(Ecuador) Joao Plata	Real Salt Lake	(United States) Joe Bendik	Orlando City SC
28	(United States) Kelyn Rowe	New England Revolution	(Canada) Cyle Larin	Orlando City SC	(Denmark) David Ousted	Vancouver Whitecaps FC
29	(Colombia) Mauro Manotas	Houston Dynamo	(Albania) Shkelzen Gashi	Colorado Rapids	(United States) Brad Knighton	New England Revolution

==== Team of the Week ====
Team of the Week
Week	Goalkeeper	Defender	Midfielder	Forward
1	(United States) Bingham (SJ)	(England) Cole (LA) (United States) Moor (TOR) (United States) Zimmerman (DAL)	(Colombia) Chara (POR) (Uruguay) Fagundez (NE) (Argentina) Martínez (RSL) (United States) McNamara (NYC)	(Canada) Larin (ORL) (United States) Magee (LA) (Argentina) Piatti (MTL)
2	(Jamaica) Blake (PHI)	(United States) Beasley (HOU) (Belgium) Ciman (MTL) (Trinidad and Tobago) Williams (COL)	(Haiti) Mustivar (SKC) (United States) Pontius (PHI) (Nigeria) Sunday (RSL) (United States) Wenger (HOU)	(England) Dwyer (SKC) (Argentina) Piatti (MTL) (Spain) Villa (NYC)
3	(United States) Shuttleworth (NE)	(United States) Hollingshead (DAL) (United States) Rosenberry (PHI) (Costa Rica) Waston (VAN)	(Argentina) Díaz (DAL) (Brazil) Felipe (NYR) (Colombia) Higuita (ORL) (United States) Zardes (LA)	(Nigeria) Adi (POR) (United States) Bruin (HOU) (United States) Sapong (PHI)
4	(Denmark) Ousted (VAN)	(Argentina) Bravo (NYC) (United States) Jacobson (VAN) (United States) Tierney (NE)	(United States) Bunbury (NE) (Argentina) Díaz (DAL) (United States) McNamara (NYC) (Chile) Morales (VAN)	(Colombia) Barrios (DAL) (Colombia) Castillo (DAL) (Argentina) Urruti (DAL)
5	(Denmark) Ousted (VAN)	(Netherlands) Kappelhof (CHI) (United States) Maund (RSL) (United States) Rogers (LA) (United States) Shea (ORL)	(Cuba) Alonso (SEA) (Colombia) Higuita (ORL) (United States) Neagle (DC) (Ecuador) Plata (RSL)	(Albania) Gashi (COL) (Brazil) Kaká (ORL)
6	(United States) Melia (SKC)	(Belgium) Ciman (MTL) (United States) Marshall (SEA) (Costa Rica) Matarrita (NYC)	(Jamaica) Barnes (HOU) (Colombia) Chara (POR) (Ghana) Koffie (NE) (Argentina) Piatti (MTL)	(United States) Amarikwa (SJ) (Argentina) Espíndola (DC) (Costa Rica) Saborío (DC)
7	(United States) Rimando (RSL)	(Iran) Beitashour (TOR) (Belgium) Ciman (MTL) (Jamaica) Phillips (RSL)	(Austria) Ivanschitz (SEA) (United States) Jones (COL) (Iraq) Meram (CLB) (Argentina) Piatti (MTL)	(Nigeria) Adi (POR) (Colombia) Castillo (DAL) (Mexico) Dos Santos (LA)
8	(Denmark) Ousted (VAN)	(United States) Boswell (DC) (United States) Harvey (VAN) (United States) Moor (TOR)	(Switzerland) Barnetta (PHI) (Ghana) Boateng (LA) (United States) Bradley (TOR) (United States) Kljestan (NYR)	(Mexico) Dos Santos (LA) (Italy) Giovinco (TOR) (England) Wright-Phillips (NYR)
9	(New Zealand) Gleeson (POR)	(United States) Scott (SEA) (United States) Wynne (SJ) (United States) Zusi (SKC)	(United States) Allen (RSL) (Brazil) Felipe (NYR) (Albania) Gashi (COL) (United States) Kljestan (NYR) (Argentina) Valeri (POR)	(Ivory Coast) Drogba (MTL) (Spain) Villa (NYC)
10	(United States) Irwin (TOR)	(United States) Horst (HOU) (Costa Rica) Matarrita (NYC) (Poland) Perquis (TOR)	(United States) Jones (COL) (United States) Kljestan (NYR) (United States) Nagbe (POR) (Argentina) Piatti (MTL)	(Japan) Kudo (VAN) (United States) Morris (SEA) (United States) Zardes (LA)
11	(United States) Worra (DC)	(United States) Hernandez (NYC) (Trinidad and Tobago) Williams (COL) (United States) Zimmerman (DAL)	(Honduras) Espinoza (SKC) (The Gambia) Manneh (VAN) (Ghana) Nyarko (DC) (Panama) Quintero (SJ)	(Italy) Giovinco (TOR) (Panama) Pérez (VAN) (Spain) Villa (NYC)
12	(United States) Bendik (ORL)	(United States) Glad (RSL) (United States) Marquez (PHI) (Sweden) Sjöberg (COL)	(United States) Acosta (DAL) (United States) Grella (NYR) (Brazil) Kaká (ORL) (United States) McCarty (NYR) (United States) Nagbe (POR)	(Canada) Akindele (DAL) (England) Wright-Phillips (NYR)
13	(United States) Robles (NYR)	(United States) Allen (NYC) (United States) Beasley (HOU) (Ghana) Opare (DC)	(United States) Kljestan (NYR) (Trinidad and Tobago) Molino (ORL) (United States) Nguyen (NE) (Argentina) Piatti (MTL)	(Ivory Coast) Drogba (MTL) (Norway) Kamara (CLB) (England) Wright-Phillips (NYR)
14	(New Zealand) Gleeson (POR)	(Colombia) Medranda (SKC) (United States) Opara (SKC) (England) Ridgewell (POR) (United States) Rosenberry (PHI)	(Colombia) Chara (POR) (France) Nogueira (PHI) (United States) Pontius (PHI) (United States) Roldan (SEA)	(Norway) Kamara (CLB) (Armenia) Movsisyan (RSL)
15	(United States) Hamid (DC)	(United States) Burch (COL) (United States) Moor (TOR) (United States) Abdul-Salaam (SKC)	(United States) Salinas (SJ) (Brazil) Felipe (NYR) (United States) Feilhaber (SKC) (England) Harrison (NYC) (United States) Grella (NYR)	(Spain) Villa (NYC) (Argentina) Martínez (RSL)
16	(United States) Irwin (TOR)	(Costa Rica) Matarrita (NYC) (United States) Wynne (SJ) (United States) Robinson (DC)	(Brazil) Kaká (ORL) (Argentina) Valeri (POR) (Netherlands) Alberg (PHI) (Argentina) Díaz (DAL) (United States) Neagle (DC)	(The Gambia) Manneh (VAN) (England) Dwyer (SKC)
17	(United States) Hamid (DC)	(United States) Beasley (HOU) (United States) Zimmerman (DAL) (Brazil) Ramos (CHI)	(United States) Zusi (SKC) (England) Gerrard (LA) (Argentina) Díaz (DAL) (England) Harrison (NYC)	(Sierra Leone) Kamara (NE) (Norway) Kamara (CLB) (Belize) Salazar (MTL)
18	(New Zealand) Gleeson (POR)	(Jamaica) Phillips (RSL) (Belgium) Van Damme (LA) (United States) Hedges (DAL) (United States) Morrow (TOR)	(Netherlands) Alberg (PHI) (United States) Larentowicz (LA) (United States) Feilhaber (SKC) (Brazil) Ilsinho (PHI)	(Republic of Ireland) Doyle (COL) (Sierra Leone) Kamara (NE)
19	(United States) Robles (NYR)	(Sweden) Sjöberg (COL) (Honduras) Bernárdez (SJ) (United States) Maund (RSL)	(Colombia) Castillo (DAL) (United States) Kljestan (NYR) (Argentina) Valeri (POR) (Argentina) Díaz (DAL) (Austria) Ivanschitz (SEA)	(Spain) Villa (NYC) (Mexico) Dos Santos (LA)
20	(Denmark) Ousted (VAN)	(Cameroon) Oyongo (MTL) (Belgium) Van Damme (LA) (United States) Woodberry (NE)	(United States) Muyl (NYR) (United States) Kljestan (NYR) (Republic of Ireland) Cronin (COL) (Argentina) Piatti (MTL)	(England) Dwyer (SKC) (Italy) Giovinco (TOR) (Ivory Coast) Drogba (MTL)
21	(United States) Bingham (SJ)	(United States) Opara (SKC) (Belgium) Van Damme (LA) (United States) Moor (TOR)	(Trinidad and Tobago) Molino (ORL) (Uruguay) Lodeiro (SEA) (England) Lampard (NYC) (United States) McNamara (NYC)	(Argentina) Urruti (DAL) (Italy) Giovinco (TOR) (Ecuador) Plata (RSL)
22	(United States) Bush (MTL)	(United States) Burch (COL) (Luxembourg) Chanot (NYC) (United States) Moor (TOR)	(Argentina) Valeri (POR) (Uruguay) Lodeiro (SEA) (Argentina) Morales (RSL) (United States) Hairston (COL)	(United States) Morris (SEA) (Italy) Giovinco (TOR) (United States) Dempsey (SEA)
23	(United States) Bingham (SJ)	(United States) Birnbaum (DC) (Spain) Agus (HOU) (United States) Marshall (SEA)	(United States) Pontius (PHI) (Switzerland) Barnetta (PHI) (United States) Davis (NYR) (United States) Finlay (CLB)	(Spain) Villa (NYC) (England) Wright-Phillips (NYR) (England) Dwyer (SKC)
24	(United States) Willis (HOU)	(United States) Parkhurst (CLB) (Colombia) Olave (RSL) (United States) Horst (HOU) (Costa Rica) Matarrita (NYC)	(United States) Roldan (SEA) (United States) Feilhaber (SKC) (Ghana) Accam (CHI)	(United States) Dempsey (SEA) (England) Wright-Phillips (NYR) (United States) Altidore (TOR)
25	(United States) Howard (COL)	(France) Camara (MTL) (Norway) Næss (CLB) (United States) Rosenberry (PHI)	(United States) Beckerman (RSL) (Brazil) Kaká (ORL) (Brazil) Felipe (NYR) (Argentina) Valeri (POR) (Colombia) Barrios (DAL)	(United States) Mullins (DC) (Armenia) Movsisyan (RSL)
26	(United States) Johnson (CHI)	(United States) Farrell (NE) (United States) Zimmerman (DAL) (France) Collin (NYR) (Portugal) Meira (CHI)	(United States) Lletget (LA) (Argentina) Díaz (DAL) (England) Lampard (NYC) (United States) Rowe (NE)	(England) Wright-Phillips (NYR) (Netherlands) de Leeuw (CHI)
27	(United States) Howard (COL)	(Lithuania) Vytas (POR) (Costa Rica) Waston (VAN) (England) Stewart (SJ)	(Honduras) Garcia (HOU) (Brazil) Kaká (ORL) (Uganda) Azira (COL) (Ghana) Koffie (NE) (Uruguay) Fagundez (NE)	(United States) Altidore (TOR) (Mexico) Dos Santos (LA)

=== End-of-season awards ===
Award	Player/Club
Most Valuable Player	David Villa
Defender of the Year	Matt Hedges
Goalkeeper of the Year	Andre Blake
Coach of the Year	Óscar Pareja
Rookie of the Year	Jordan Morris
Newcomer of the Year	Nicolás Lodeiro
Comeback Player of the Year	Chris Pontius
Golden Boot	Bradley Wright-Phillips
Fair Play Player Award	Keegan Rosenberry
Fair Play Team Award	Columbus Crew SC
Humanitarian of the Year	Matt Lampson
Referee of the Year	Alan Kelly
Assistant Referee of the Year	Frank Anderson
Goal of the Year	Shkëlzen Gashi
Save of the Year	Joe Bendik

=== Best XI ===
Goalkeeper	Defenders	Midfielders	Forwards
(Jamaica) Andre Blake, Philadelphia	(Sweden) Axel Sjöberg, Colorado (United States) Matt Hedges, Dallas (Belgium) Jelle Van Damme, LA Galaxy	(Argentina) Mauro Díaz, Dallas (Mexico) Giovani dos Santos, LA Galaxy (United States) Sacha Kljestan, Red Bulls (Argentina) Ignacio Piatti, Montreal	(Italy) Sebastian Giovinco, Toronto (England) Bradley Wright-Phillips, Red Bulls (Spain) David Villa, New York City

== Player transfers ==
=== Allocation ranking ===
The allocation ranking is the mechanism used to determine which MLS club has first priority to acquire a player who is in the MLS allocation list. The MLS allocation list contains select U.S. National Team players and players transferred outside of MLS garnering a transfer fee of at least $500,000. The allocations will be ranked in reverse order of finish for the 2015 season, taking playoff performance into account.

Once the club uses its allocation ranking to acquire a player, it drops to the bottom of the list. A ranking can be traded provided that part of the compensation received in return is another club's ranking. At all times each club is assigned one ranking. The rankings reset at the end of each MLS season.

Original ranking	Current ranking	Club	Date allocation used (rank on that date)	Player signed	Previous club	Ref
1	1	Chicago Fire				
4	2	New York City FC				
5	3	Real Salt Lake				
6	4	Houston Dynamo				
7	5	Orlando City SC				
8	6	San Jose Earthquakes				
9	7	Toronto FC				
10	8	New England Revolution				
11	9	Sporting Kansas City				
12	10	LA Galaxy				
13	11	D.C. United				
14	12	Montreal Impact				
15	13	Seattle Sounders FC				
16	14	Vancouver Whitecaps FC				
17	15	FC Dallas				
18	16	New York Red Bulls				
19	17	Columbus Crew SC				
20	18	Portland Timbers				
2	19	Colorado Rapids	March 20, 2016 (1)	(United States) Tim Howard	(England) Everton	
3	20	Philadelphia Union	August 3, 2016 (1)	(United States) Alejandro Bedoya	(France) Nantes	

1. On January 14, 2016, Colorado Rapids acquired the number 1 allocation ranking (original ranking number 1), a first-round selection (15th overall) in the 2016 MLS SuperDraft, and a second-round selection (33rd overall) in the 2016 SuperDraft from Chicago Fire in exchange for the number 2 allocation ranking (original ranking number 2), a first-round selection (12th overall) in the 2016 SuperDraft, and a second-round selection (22nd overall) in the 2016 SuperDraft.
2. On August 3, 2016, Philadelphia Union acquired the number 1 allocation ranking (original ranking number 2) from Chicago Fire in exchange for the number 2 allocation ranking (original ranking number 3), a first-round selection in the 2017 MLS SuperDraft, and the Discovery Priority on a player to be named later.

== Television ==
=== United States ===
In the 2016 MLS season, 96 games aired in the United States on national television. English-language broadcasts once again included Soccer Sunday doubleheaders — 29 games on ESPN and 5 on ESPN2 (mainly on Sunday afternoons), 4 on Fox, and 30 on Fox Sports 1 (mainly on Sunday evenings). The 2016 season marked MLS's debut on the Fox network channel. Spanish-language broadcasts included 28 games on UniMás (mainly on Friday evenings).

U.S. TV viewership ('000)
Wkd	Date(s)	ESPN	FS1	UDN	Ref	Notes
1	March 6	362	267	148		The UDN match aired from 10:00 pm to 12:08 am, outside its usual window.
2	March 11–13	197	175	84		
3	March 18–20	179	184	98		MLS matches went head-to-head against the NCAA basketball tournament.
4	March 25–27					No Games on TV (international window).
5	April 1–3		261	185		No Games on ESPN (MLB opening day).
6	April 8–10	386	183; 270	192		Two Games on FS1, 183k NYCFC-CHI, 270k LAG-POR
7	April 15–17	229	138	109		
8	April 22–24	180	176			No Games on Unimas.
9	April 29–May 1	302	199	51		
10	May 6–8	225	199	93		
	May 20–22	463	636*; 210	190		*New York derby was broadcast on FOX instead of FS1.
	July 1–3	439	136			
	July 8–10	223	171	84		
	July 15–17	322	118			
AVG	2016	262.1	205.8	120		2016 Average

Notes:

- All viewership numbers are in thousands.
- Average viewership for the previous 2015 season was 245,000 (ESPN2), 197,000 (FS1), and 244,000 (Univ).

=== Other countries ===
TSN, RDS and Sportsnet aired matches in Canada of primarily the three Canadian-based teams.

MLS aired on Sky Sports in the United Kingdom, Eurosport in Continental Europe, Abu Dhabi Media in the Middle East and North Africa, Letv Sports in China, beIN Sports in Asia-Pacific, ESPN and Fox Sports in Latin America, SporTV in Brazil and Fox Sports in Africa.

== 2016 attendances ==
The following is a list of the average attendance for each of the twenty MLS teams at their regular-season games. It includes the team, the average attendance for the 2016 regular season and the 2015 regular season, the percentage change in attendance from season-to-season, the home venue, the home venue's capacity, and the percent of capacity.

Team	2016 Attendance	2015 Attendance	Change	Stadium	Capacity (Unrestricted)	Percent (2016)
Seattle Sounders FC	42,636	44,247	-4%	CenturyLink Field	39,115 (69,000)	109% (62%)
Orlando City SC	31,324	32,847	-5%	Camping World Stadium	19,500 (65,000)	161% (48%)
New York City FC	27,196	29,016	-6%	Yankee Stadium	27,470 (49,638)	99% (55%)
Toronto FC	26,583	23,451	+13%	BMO Field	30,226	88%
LA Galaxy	25,138	23,392	+7%	StubHub Center	27,167	93%
Vancouver Whitecaps FC	22,330	20,507	+9%	BC Place	22,120 (54,500)	101% (41%)
Portland Timbers	21,144	21,144	0%	Providence Park	21,144	100%
Montreal Impact	20,669	17,750	+16%	Saputo Stadium	20,801	99%
New York Red Bulls	20,620	19,657	+5%	Red Bull Arena	25,219	82%
New England Revolution	20,185	19,627	+3%	Gillette Stadium	20,000 (66,829)	101% (30%)
San Jose Earthquakes	19,930	20,979	-5%	Avaya Stadium	18,000	111%
Real Salt Lake	19,759	20,160	-2%	Rio Tinto Stadium	20,213	98%
Sporting Kansas City	19,597	19,687	-0.5%	Children's Mercy Park	18,467	106%
Houston Dynamo	19,021	20,658	-8%	BBVA Compass Stadium	22,039	86%
Philadelphia Union	17,519	17,451	0%	PPL Park	18,500	95%
Columbus Crew SC	17,125	16,513	+4%	Mapfre Stadium	20,145	85%
D.C. United	17,081	16,244	+5%	RFK Stadium	20,000 (45,596)	85% (37%)
Colorado Rapids	16,278	15,657	+4%	Dick's Sporting Goods Park	18,061	90%
Chicago Fire	15,602	16,003	-3%	Toyota Park	20,000	78%
FC Dallas	14,094	16,015	-12%	Toyota Stadium	20,500	67%

Note: Vancouver's and Seattle's attendances are both over 100% capacity because, for select games, they open up additional sections above the regular limited capacity. Orlando's and New England's attendances are over 100% because their capacities are artificial; both teams regularly sell more tickets than the limit. San Jose's attendance is over 100% capacity because they played one game at Levi's Stadium (68,000 capacity).

== Coaches ==
=== Eastern Conference ===
- Chicago Fire: Veljko Paunović
- Columbus Crew SC: Gregg Berhalter
- D.C. United: Ben Olsen
- Montreal Impact: Mauro Biello
- New England Revolution: Jay Heaps
- New York City FC: Patrick Vieira
- New York Red Bulls: Jesse Marsch
- Orlando City SC: Jason Kreis
- Philadelphia Union: Jim Curtin
- Toronto FC: Greg Vanney

=== Western Conference ===
- Colorado Rapids: Pablo Mastroeni
- FC Dallas: Óscar Pareja
- Houston Dynamo: Owen Coyle, Wade Barrett and Wílmer Cabrera
- Los Angeles Galaxy: Bruce Arena
- Portland Timbers: Caleb Porter
- Real Salt Lake: Jeff Cassar
- San Jose Earthquakes: Dominic Kinnear
- Seattle Sounders FC: Sigi Schmid and Brian Schmetzer
- Sporting Kansas City: Peter Vermes
- Vancouver Whitecaps FC: Carl Robinson

== See also ==
- List of Major League Soccer transfers 2016
- 2016 MLS Cup Playoffs
