= Khaly Thiam =

Senegalese footballer

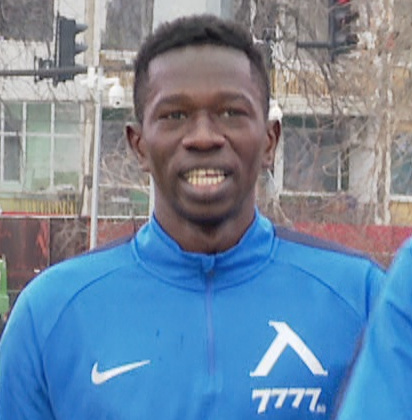
- Thiam in 2020

Personal information
- Full name: Khaly Iyane Thiam
- Date of birth: 7 January 1994 (age 32)
- Place of birth: Dakar, Senegal
- Height: 1.86 m (6 ft 1 in)
- Position: Defensive midfielder

Youth career
- Racing Club Dakar

Senior career*
Years	Team	Apps	(Gls)
2012–2014	Kaposvári Rákóczi	25	(4)
2012–2014	Kaposvári Rákóczi II	13	(3)
2014–2018	MTK Budapest	47	(3)
2016	→ Chicago Fire (loan)	20	(1)
2017	→ Gaziantepspor (loan)	11	(1)
2017	→ Dynamo Moscow (loan)	6	(0)
2018	→ Levski Sofia (loan)	10	(0)
2018–2020	Levski Sofia	51	(4)
2020–2022	Altay	54	(3)
2022	Pendikspor	12	(0)
2023–2024	MTK Budapest	23	(2)
- * Club domestic league appearances and goals as of 30 August 2024

Khaly Thiam (born 7 January 1994) is a Senegalese professional footballer who plays as a defensive midfielder.

== Career ==
Thiam started his senior footballing career in 2012 in Hungary with Kaposvári Rákóczi, making 25 appearances and scoring 4 goals in two years with the Nemzeti Bajnokság I team; he also played 13 times for the team's reserves in the second tier Nemzeti Bajnokság II. In 2014, Thiam joined fellow Hungarian top-flight club MTK Budapest and subsequently made his debut on 26 July in a league match against Pécsi MFC. 47 appearances and 3 goals in his first two seasons came prior to him leaving MTK to complete a loan move to Major League Soccer club Chicago Fire on 4 May 2016. He scored one goal, vs. Philadelphia Union, in twenty games in the United States before returning to Hungary.

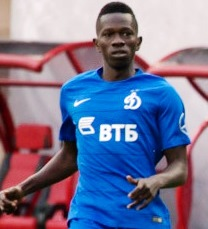
Thiam with Dynamo Moscow in 2017

On 25 January 2017, Thiam joined Süper Lig side Gaziantepspor on a three-and-a-half-year contract.

On 21 August 2017, Russian club Dynamo Moscow announced the signing of Thiam on a one-year loan deal from MTK Budapest (as Gaziantepspor did not activate a buyout option). The Dynamo contract included a buyout option. The loan was terminated on 12 February 2018 by mutual consent after Thiam failed to establish his position in the Dynamo squad.

On 14 February 2018, he was loaned to the Bulgarian club Levski Sofia until the end of the season. On 2 June 2018, Thiam was permanently transferred to Levski, where he established himself as a regular starter. On 28 June 2020, he captained the team in a 2–1 away win over Beroe in a First League game, which had been announced beforehand to be his last match for the "bluemen".

In August 2020 Thiam joined Turkish club Altay. In July 2022, Thiam joined Pendikspor where he remained until December 2022.

On 31 January 2023, Thiam returned to MTK Budapest, now in the second-tier Nemzeti Bajnokság II. He signed a two-and-a-half-year contract.

== Personal life ==
In an interview for Hungarian media in July 2019, Thiam announced he had sent his documents for a Hungarian passport since he moved to the country at age 18 and his wife, with whom they have two kids, is also Hungarian, and he also showed a desire to represent Hungary at international level.

== Career statistics ==
As of 8 December 2017

Appearances and goals by club, season and competition
Club	Season	League		National cup		League cup		Continental		Total	
Club	Season	Apps	Goals	Apps	Goals	Apps	Goals	Apps	Goals	Apps	Goals
Kaposvári Rákóczi	2012–13	6	1	0	0	5	0	—		11	1
Kaposvári Rákóczi	2013–14	19	3	2	1	4	0	—		25	4
Kaposvári Rákóczi	Total	25	4	2	1	9	0	0	0	36	5
Kaposvári Rákóczi II	2012–13	13	3	—		—		—		13	3
Kaposvári Rákóczi II	2013–14	0	0	—		—		—		0	0
Kaposvári Rákóczi II	Total	13	3	0	0	0	0	0	0	13	3
MTK Budapest	2014–15	16	1	0	0	11	1	—		27	2
MTK Budapest	2015–16	31	2	2	0	—		2	0	35	2
MTK Budapest	2016–17	0	0	0	0	—		0	0	0	0
MTK Budapest	Total	47	3	2	0	11	1	2	0	62	4
Chicago Fire (loan)	2016	20	1	3	1	—		—		23	2
Gaziantepspor (loan)	2016–17	11	1	0	0	—		—		11	1
Dynamo Moscow (loan)	2017–18	6	0	0	0	—		—		6	0
Career total		122	12	7	2	20	1	2	0	151	15
