= Johan Kappelhof =

Dutch footballer (born 1990)

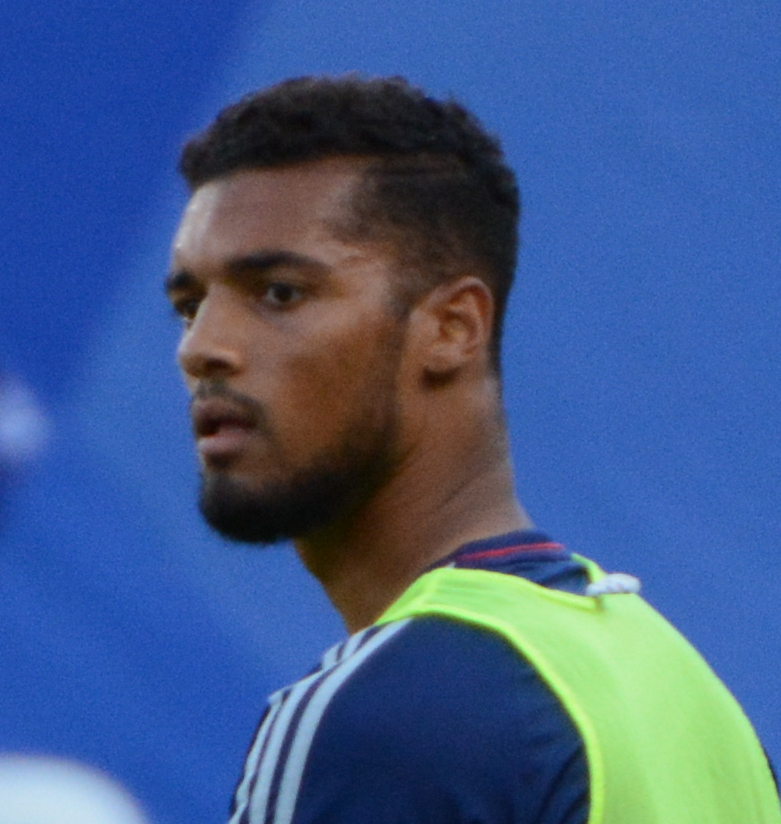
- Kappelhof with Chicago Fire in 2017

Personal information
- Full name: Johan Kappelhof
- Date of birth: 5 August 1990 (age 36)
- Place of birth: Amsterdam, Netherlands
- Height: 1.80 m (5 ft 11 in)
- Position: Defender

Team information
- Current team: Safa

Youth career
- Amstelland
- –2011: Ajax

Senior career*
Years	Team	Apps	(Gls)
2011–2016	Groningen	123	(3)
2016–2021	Chicago Fire	158	(0)
2022	Real Salt Lake	6	(1)
2023	Safa	11	(0)

International career
2011–2013	Netherlands U21	5	(0)
- * Club domestic league appearances and goals as of 27:57, 16 December 2024 (UTC)

Johan Kappelhof (born 5 August 1990) is a Dutch professional footballer who plays as a defender for Lebanese Premier League club Safa.

== Career ==
Kappelhof was born in Amsterdam, Netherlands. Whilst being in Ajax's youth academy for 13 years he moved from being a right winger to a defender.

At Groningen he made his debut in 2011, before helping them win the KNVB Cup in 2014–15 against defending champions PEC Zwolle. It was their first major trophy and they qualified for the UEFA Europa League. He played in all six of Groningen's Europe league group games.

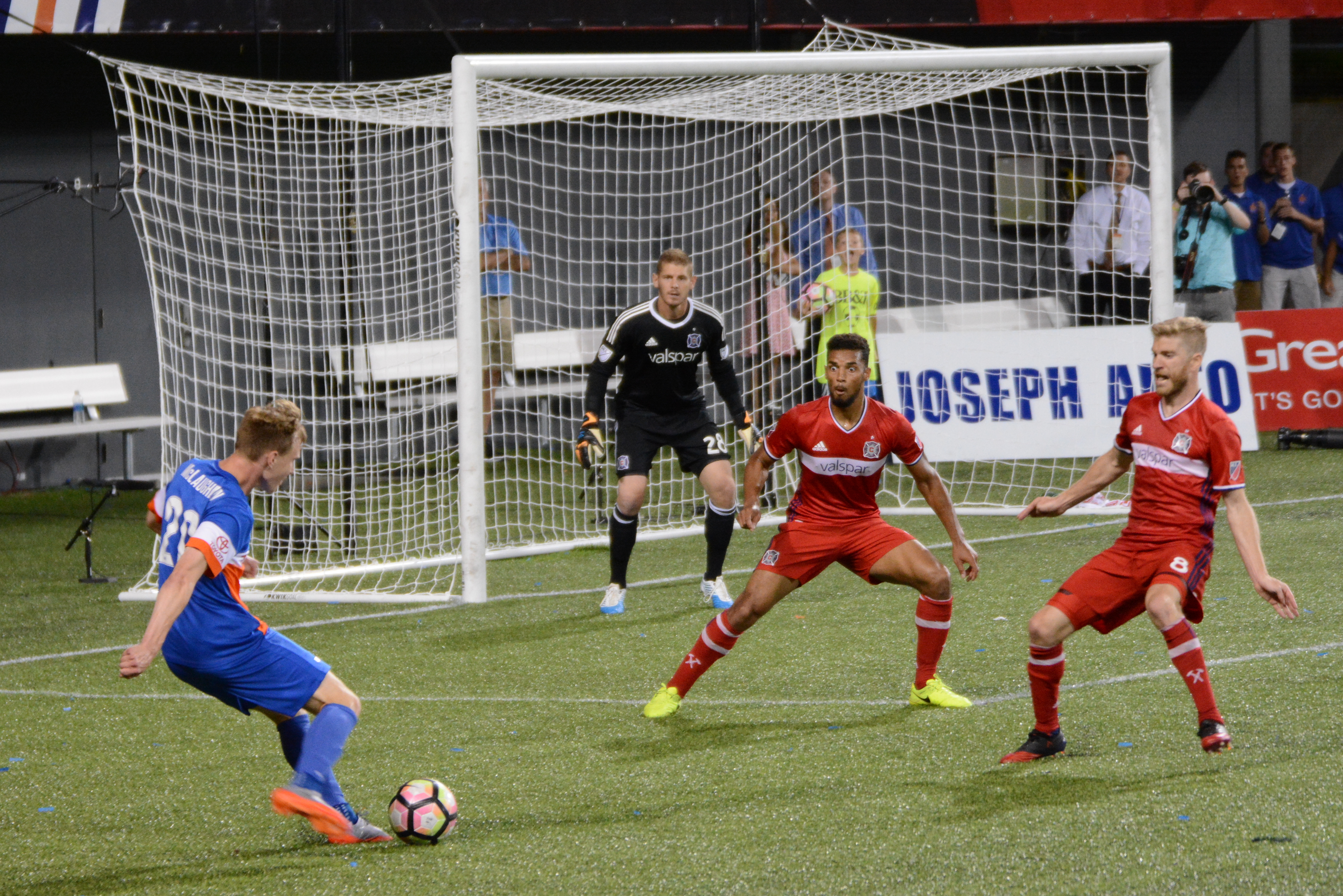
Lampson, Kappelhof, and de Leeuw of Chicago Fire defend against FC Cincinnati's Jimmy McLaughlin in the 2017 U.S. Open Cup.

=== Chicago Fire ===
On 2 February 2016, Kappelhof joined American Major League Soccer club Chicago Fire. Following the 2017 season, he was voted the club's defender of the year after earning 4 assists in 33 matches.

Kappelhof's contract with Chicago expired after the 2021 season, and he became a free agent.

=== Real Salt Lake ===
On 18 February 2022, Kappelhof signed as a free agent with Real Salt Lake. Following the 2022 season, his contract option was declined by Salt Lake.

=== Safa ===
On 2 July 2023, Kappelhof signed for Safa in the Lebanese Premier League, ahead of the 2023–24 season.

== Personal life ==
Kappelhof has a Ghanaian mother and a Dutch father.

== Career statistics ==
=== Club ===
As of match played 8 October 2020

Appearances and goals by club, season and competition
Club	Season	League			National Cup		Continental		Other		Total	
Club	Season	Division	Apps	Goals	Apps	Goals	Apps	Goals	Apps	Goals	Apps	Goals
Groningen	2011–12	Eredivisie	23	0	1	0	—		—		24	0
Groningen	2012–13	Eredivisie	21	0	3	0	—		—		24	0
Groningen	2013–14	Eredivisie	36	2	3	0	—		—		39	2
Groningen	2014–15	Eredivisie	29	0	6	1	2 (Note: Appearance(s) in UEFA Europa League)	0	—		37	1
Groningen	2015–16	Eredivisie	18	1	2	0	6	0	—		26	1
Groningen	Total		127	3	15	1	8	0	0	0	150	4
Chicago Fire	2016	Major League Soccer	33	0	4	0	—		—		37	0
Chicago Fire	2017	Major League Soccer	33	0	2	0	—		1 (Note: Appearance(s) in MLS Cup Playoffs)	0	36	0
Chicago Fire	2018	Major League Soccer	29	0	3	0	—		—		32	0
Chicago Fire	2019	Major League Soccer	29	0	1	0	0	0	—		30	0
Chicago Fire	2020	Major League Soccer	4	0	—		—		—		4	0
Chicago Fire	Total		128	0	10	0	0	0	1	0	139	0
Career total			255	3	25	0	8	0	1	0	289	0

== Honours ==
Groningen

- KNVB Cup: 2014–15
