= João Meira =

Portuguese footballer (born 1987)

Personal information
- Full name: João Diogo Serpa Meira
- Date of birth: 30 April 1987 (age 39)
- Place of birth: Lisbon, Portugal
- Height: 1.85 m (6 ft 1 in)
- Position: Centre-back

Youth career
- 1995–2003: Cova Piedade
- 2003–2006: Vitória Setúbal

Senior career*
| Years | Team | Apps | (Gls) |
| 2006–2008 | Cova Piedade | | |
| 2008–2009 | Mafra | 24 | (0) |
| 2009–2012 | Atlético | 66 | (2) |
| 2012–2015 | Belenenses | 79 | (2) |
| 2016–2017 | Chicago Fire | 59 | (0) |
| 2018 | Lorca | 0 | (0) |
| 2018 | Vålerenga | 2 | (0) |
| 2019 | Concordia Chiajna | 13 | (0) |
| 2019–2020 | Vitória Setúbal | 8 | (0) |
| 2020–2021 | Cova Piedade | 24 | (1) |
| 2021–2023 | Leixões | 23 | (0) |
| Total | | 298 | (5) |
- * Club domestic league appearances and goals

João Diogo Serpa Meira (born 30 April 1987) is a Portuguese former professional footballer who played as a central defender.

== Club career ==
Born in Lisbon and raised in Almada, Meira spent until the age of 24 competing in the third and fourth divisions. In the 2010–11 season, he started in all of his 33 league appearances as Atlético Clube de Portugal returned to the Segunda Liga following a lengthy absence.

Meira made his professional debut on 31 July 2011, in a 0–1 home loss against S.C. Freamunde in the first round of the Taça da Liga. On 2 February 2012, he was suspended for eight months after failing a drug test on 29 May of the previous year, in a match against Padroense FC.

For 2012–13, Meira joined C.F. Os Belenenses also in the second tier, signing a three-year contract. He contributed 34 games and two goals, as the Lisbon side returned to the Primeira Liga after three years, as champions with 21 points more than the closest team in the table.

From 2013 to 2015, Meira started in 43 of his 45 league appearances, and Belenenses also qualified for the UEFA Europa League in the latter season. On 23 January 2016, aged 28, he moved abroad for the first time in his career, signing with Chicago Fire FC of Major League Soccer as a free agent. He made his debut on 6 March, as the campaign opened with a 3–4 home defeat to New York City FC.

After a solid performance during a 3–0 win over Philadelphia Union at Toyota Park on 4 September 2016, Meira earned a spot on the Team of the Week. In November 2017, he announced he would not continue the following season.

Meira joined Spanish Segunda División club Lorca FC on 11 January 2018. Eleven days later, however, after the latter failed to meet the terms of the contract, he left.

On 23 March 2018, Meira signed a one-year deal with Vålerenga Fotball from the Norwegian Eliteserien. In late January 2019, he moved to the Romanian Liga I with CS Concordia Chiajna.

Meira retired in October 2023 aged 36, following one-season spells with Vitória de Setúbal (top division), C.D. Cova da Piedade and Leixões SC (second). Immediately afterwards, he was named his last club's sporting director.
