= Jonathan Campbell (soccer) =

American soccer player (born 1993)

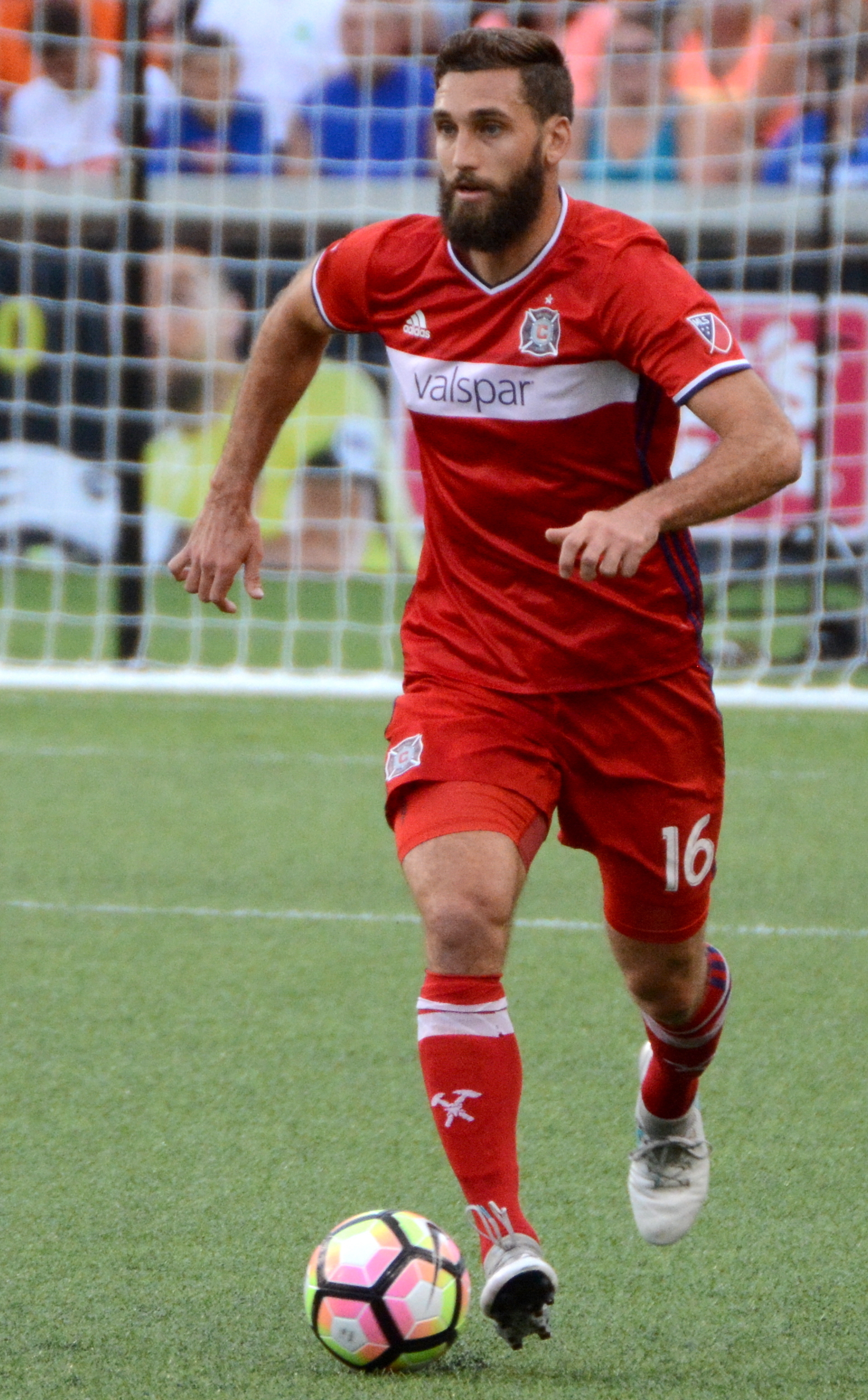
- Campbell playing for Chicago Fire in 2017

Personal information
- Date of birth: June 27, 1993 (age 33)
- Place of birth: Greensboro, North Carolina, United States
- Height: 1.88 m (6 ft 2 in)
- Position: Defender

Youth career
- 2008–2012: North Carolina Fusion

College career
Years	Team	Apps	(Gls)
2012–2015	North Carolina Tar Heels	77	(3)

Senior career*
Years	Team	Apps	(Gls)
2011–2013	Carolina Dynamo	20	(1)
2015	Seattle Sounders FC U-23	12	(1)
2016–2018	Chicago Fire	72	(1)
2019	Seattle Sounders FC	4	(0)
2019	→ Tacoma Defiance (loan)	1	(0)
Total		109	(3)

International career^{‡}
- United States U18
- * Club domestic league appearances and goals as of October 20, 2019 ‡ National team caps and goals as of February 5, 2016

Jonathan Campbell (born June 27, 1993) is an American former professional soccer player who played as a defender.

== Career ==
Campbell attended Greensboro Day School where he was the Gatorade State Player of the Year his senior year.

After spending four years at University of North Carolina, Campbell was drafted as the twelfth overall pick in the 2016 MLS SuperDraft by Chicago Fire.

At college, Campbell finished 2015 with NSCAA First Team All-American and First Team All-ACC honors.

He made his professional debut as a half-time substitute in a 3–4 loss against New York City FC on March 6, 2016.

Campbell was released by Chicago at the end of their 2018 season.

On December 28, 2018, Campbell's rights were traded to Seattle Sounders FC in exchange for a fourth-round pick in the 2020 MLS SuperDraft. He was released by Seattle at the end of the 2019 season. On May 7, 2020, Campbell announced he was retiring from professional soccer.

== Honors ==
=== Player ===
Seattle Sounders FC

- MLS Cup: 2019
