= Rodrigo Ramos =

Brazilian footballer (born 1995)

Personal information
- Full name: Rodrigo de Oliveira Ramos
- Date of birth: 24 May 1995 (age 31)
- Place of birth: Juazeiro, Brazil
- Height: 1.73 m (5 ft 8 in)
- Position: Right-back

Team information
- Current team: Brasiliense

Youth career
- Coritiba

Senior career*
| Years | Team | Apps | (Gls) |
| 2015–2018 | Coritiba | 25 | (0) |
| 2016 | → Maringá (loan) | 0 | (0) |
| 2016 | → Chicago Fire (loan) | 21 | (0) |
| 2019–2020 | Juazeirense | 19 | (1) |
| 2020 | Jacuipense | 4 | (0) |
| 2021 | Botafogo-PB | 12 | (0) |
| 2022 | Juazeirense | 8 | (0) |
| 2022 | Juazeiro | 11 | (1) |
| 2022 | Atlético Ceilandense | 3 | (0) |
| 2022– | Brasiliense | 0 | (0) |

International career
| 2015 | Brazil U20 | 2 | (0) |
- * Club domestic league appearances and goals as of 21:18, 16 November 2022 (UTC)

Rodrigo de Oliveira Ramos (born 24 May 1995), sometimes known as just Rodrigo, is a Brazilian professional footballer who plays as a right back for Juazeirense.
