= Paralyzed Veterans of America =

US nonprofit organization

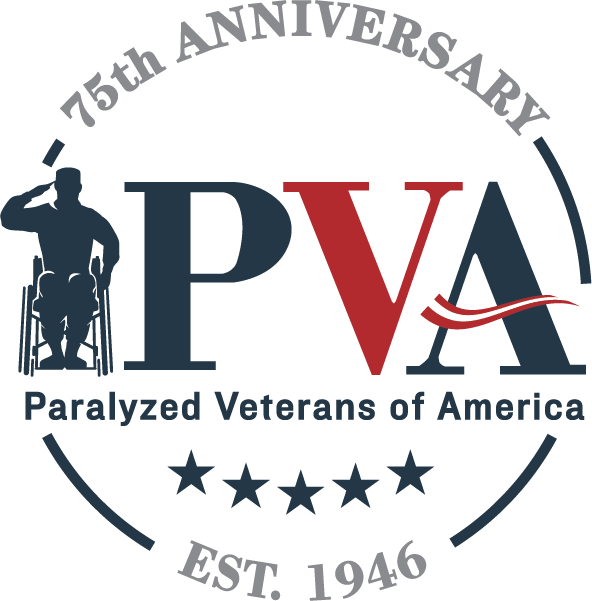
- Nickname: PVA
- Formation: 1946
- Headquarters: Washington, DC
- Leader: Charles Brown, President
- Website: pva.org

The Paralyzed Veterans of America was established in 1946 with the goal of serving the needs of disabled veterans. The organization was created to assist members, such as veterans of the armed forces living with spinal cord injuries or diseases like multiple sclerosis (MS) or amyotrophic lateral sclerosis (ALS) in living with increased independence and dignity.

PVA is a Congressionally-chartered organization under Title 36 of the United States Code, headquartered in Washington, D.C. It currently has 33 chapters and 70 National Service Offices across the US and Puerto Rico. Their overall mission is to help paralyzed veterans and all people with disabilities live fuller, more productive lives.

== Programs and services ==
The Paralyzed Veterans of America (PVA) provides integrative programs and services to severely disabled veterans. Some offerings include medical services and health policy, research and education, veterans benefits, government advocacy and legislation, architecture, Veterans Career Program, and sports and recreation. The primary focus of PVA services is veterans with spinal cord injuries and diseases; it extends support to able-bodied, ill, wounded, and injured veterans of all branches, conflicts, and eras, as well as to dependents, survivors, and caregivers in the global disability community.

PVA services are provided free of charge to veterans and their families. The organization is primarily funded through individual donations and corporate sponsors.

=== Veterans benefits ===
PVA offers assistance with VA claims and appeals to any veteran, family member, or caregiver.

Shortly after a veteran is injured, a PVA National Service Officer comes to their bedside to assist them with filing for VA benefits, with the aim of allowing the veteran to focus solely on recovery. NSO's are typically experts in veterans' law and VA regulations, and must know how to apply that knowledge to fight for the benefits a veteran has earned. This includes claims for service-connected compensation, non-service-connected pensions, home health care, specially adapted housing, automobile grants and adaptive equipment.

=== Medical services and health policy ===
PVA's medical services team strives to ensure the Department of Veterans Affairs is implementing best practices to improve quality of care in VA Spinal Cord Injury and Disorders Centers (SCI/D) across the country. During annual site visits to VA SCI/D and long-term care centers, PVA inspects facilities, confers with staff, ensures problems have been corrected, and speaks directly to patients about their needs. PVA's site visit team is composed of physicians, nurses, staff, architects, and a field advisory committee who are paralyzed veterans themselves.

PVA's medical services department also operates a SCI/D hotline and develops consumer and clinical practice guidelines widely considered to set the standard of care.

=== Veterans Career Program ===
PVA's Veterans Career Program provides career assistance and vocational counseling to transitioning service members, veterans, military spouses, and caregivers. The program operates through eight locations nationwide: Atlanta, Long Beach, Minneapolis, Philadelphia, Richmond, San Antonio, San Diego, and Washington, D.C.

Clients receive one-on-one engagement on their path toward meaningful employment. Support is focused on the unique needs of each client, and can range from in-depth vocational rehabilitation, to developing a resume or practicing interviewing skills. The program has strong relationships with key employers, and PVA is able to provide needed support to these employers so they can successfully integrate Veterans into their organizations.

PVA staff work with any Veteran who needs help, but they specialize in those with barriers to employment, such as catastrophic injury or illness. This commitment was recognized by the U.S. Chamber of Commerce Foundation's Hiring Our Heroes program, when PVA was a finalist for their Wounded Veteran and Military Caregiver Employment Award.

=== Veterans Career Live ===
Veterans Career Live is a virtual engagement initiative that reaches Veterans who do not have the time, means, or ability to attend traditional employment or educational events.

With Veterans Career Live, veterans can:

- Interact with PVA employment experts through virtual meetings.
- Access an online library of career information, recorded presentations and other tools and resources.
- Discover a wide range of education, volunteer, and employment opportunities.

=== Architecture ===
PVA promotes state-of-the-art healing facilities for spinal cord injured veterans at VA hospitals, as well as barrier-free environments around the country for all people with disabilities. To accomplish this, PVA employs on-staff architects who work directly the VA and design teams.

PVA is also a strong advocate for accessible design in the building and construction industries. PVA architects are frequently asked to consult on accessibility standards and building codes, and to work with cities and municipalities to improve access to facilities and transportation systems. They help advance accessible design through teaching, public speaking, seminars, and publications that deal with accessibility issues.

Some of PVA's notable achievements include advising on the accessibility of:

- Washington Nationals (Nationals Park) Ballpark
- Virginia Governor's Executive Mansion
- Dwight D. Eisenhower Memorial
- Minnesota Vikings (U.S. Bank) Stadium
- REACH, a unique expansion of the John F. Kennedy Center for the Performing Arts

The Air Carrier Access Act of 1986 prohibits commercial airlines from discriminating against passengers with disabilities. The act was passed by the U.S. Congress in direct response to a narrow interpretation of Section 504 of the Rehabilitation Act of 1973 by the U.S. Supreme Court in U.S. Department of Transportation (DOT) v. Paralyzed Veterans of America (PVA) (1986). In this case, the Supreme Court held that private, commercial air carriers are not liable under Section 504 because they are not "direct recipients" of federal funding to airports.

=== Research and education ===
PVA supports research, educational programs, and other initiatives that unite people and activities toward a single mission: improved quality of life for everyone with spinal cord injury or disorders SCI/D, and diseases like MS and ALS.

The PVA Research Foundation funds scientists who conduct research to improve the lives of veterans and others living with SCI/D, as well as diseases like MS and ALS. These scientists address significant problems that impact our lives and develop new strategies to ameliorate them. Some strategies become clinical protocols and guide best practices, others are used to guide additional research efforts.

=== Sports and recreation ===
From handcycling, bass fishing, bowling and billiards, to boccia, shooting sports, and an annual quad rugby tournament, PVA provides a wide variety of sports and recreation opportunities to enhance the fitness and quality of life for veterans with disabilities.

== Ratings ==
PVA received a Gold Star rating from GuideStar based on organizational mission, impact, financial data, and commitment to transparency in accordance with GAAP. PVA has also earned GuideStar's Platinum Seal of Transparency by voluntarily sharing the measures of progress and results they use to pursue their mission.

In 2019, PVA was named one of the Top 5 Veterans Nonprofits by Impact Matters, a new charity rating system that measures the impact of contributions.

== Presidents ==
Past presidents include:

- Gilford S. Moss: 1947
- Robert Moss: 1948
- Bernard Shufelt: 1948–1950
- Patterson Grissom: 1950–1951
- Stanley Reese: 1951–1952
- William P. Green: 1952–1954
- Robert Frost: 1954–1956
- Raymond Conley: 1956–1957
- Harry A. Schweikert Jr.: 1958–1959
- Dwight D. Guilfold Jr.: 1959–1960
- Robert Classon: 1960–1962
- John J. Farkas: 1962–1964
- Harold L. Stone Jr.: 1964
- Harold W. Wagner: 1964–1966
- Leslie P. Burghoff Jr.: 1966–1968
- Wayne L. Capson: 1968–1970
- Carlos Rodriguez: 1970–1972
- Frank R. DeGeorge: 1972–1974
- Donald H. Broderick: 1974–1976
- Edward R. Jasper: 1976–1978
- Joseph M. Romagnano: 1978–1980
- Michael F. Delaney: 1980–1982
- Paul M. Cheremeta: 1982–1984
- Richard D. Hoover: 1984–1987
- John H. Michaels: 1987–1989
- F. David Parker: 1989–1990
- Victor S. McCoy, Sr.: 1990–1992
- Richard F. Johnson: 1992–1994
- Richard Grant: 1994–1996
- Kenneth C. Huber: 1996–1998
- Homer S. Townsend Jr.: 1998–2000
- Joseph L. Fox, Sr.: 2000–2004
- Randy L. Pleva, Sr.: 2004–2009
- Gene A. Crayton: 2009–2010
- Bill Lawson: 2010–2014
- Albert Kovach Jr.: 2014–2017
- David Zurfluh: 2017–2021
- Charles Brown: 2021–2023
- Robert Thomas 2023-

== See also ==
- American Theater (1939–1945)
- Birmingham General Hospital, California
- California during World War II
- Ernest Bors
- United States home front during World War II
