= 2009 Los Angeles Galaxy season =

American soccer club season

Los Angeles Galaxy
2009 season
- Owner: Philip Anschutz (AEG)
- Coach: Bruce Arena
- Major League Soccer: Western Conference: 1st Overall: 2nd
- MLS Cup: Runners-up
- U.S. Open Cup: Did not qualify
- Average home league attendance: 20,827
Home colors	Away colors

The 2009 Los Angeles Galaxy season was the 14th season of the team's existence. It began on March 22, 2009, with a 2-2 home draw against D.C. United, and ended on November 22, 2009, with a loss on penalties to Real Salt Lake in the 2009 MLS Cup Final.

== Squad ==
=== First-team squad ===
As of August 29, 2009.

Note: Flags indicate national team as defined under FIFA eligibility rules; some limited exceptions apply. Players may hold more than one non-FIFA nationality.

No.	Pos.	Nation	Player
1	GK	JAM	Donovan Ricketts
2	DF	USA	Todd Dunivant
3	DF	USA	Leonard Griffin
4	DF	USA	Omar Gonzalez
5	DF	TRI	Yohance Marshall
6	MF	USA	Eddie Lewis
7	MF	USA	Chris Klein (Vice Captain)
8	MF	UKR	Dema Kovalenko
9	FW	USA	Jovan Kirovski
10	FW	USA	Landon Donovan (Captain)
11	FW	USA	Alecko Eskandarian
12	GK	PUR	Josh Saunders
14	FW	USA	Edson Buddle

No.	Pos.	Nation	Player
15	MF	BRA	Stefani Miglioranzi
16	DF	USA	Gregg Berhalter
17	FW	USA	Tristan Bowen
18	MF	USA	Mike Magee
20	DF	USA	A. J. DeLaGarza
21	FW	USA	Alan Gordon
22	DF	USA	Tony Sanneh
23	MF	ENG	David Beckham
24	DF	USA	Julian Valentin
27	FW	USA	Bryan Jordan
28	DF	USA	Sean Franklin
30	MF	ENG	Kyle Patterson
33	MF	TRI	Chris Birchall

== Off-season ==
The Galaxy was involved in the following off-season activity:

=== Draft ===
The 2009 MLS SuperDraft took place on January 15, 2009, with draft order determined by regular and post-season record.

Players marked with an asterisk after their previous club affiliation were contracted under the Generation Adidas program.

Player	Position	Pick overall (round)	Previous club
Omar Gonzalez	D	#3 (1st)	University of Maryland '*'
A. J. DeLaGarza	D	#19 (2nd)	University of Maryland
Joshua Boateng	F	#33 (3rd)	Liberty University
Kyle Patterson	M	#48 (4th)	Saint Louis University; St. Louis Lions

== Statistics ==
Statistics are from all MLS matches. Ages are as of March 19, 2009 (the date of their season opener).

Last updated: September 20, 2009.

Nat	No	Player	Age	Pos	Starts	Apps	G	A	Booked	Sent off (straight red)	Acquired
(United States)	2	Todd Dunivant	December 26, 1980 (aged 28)	DF	21	22	1	2	0	0	
(United States)	3	Leonard Griffin	September 11, 1982 (aged 26)	DF	0	1	0	0	0	0	
(United States)	4	Omar Gonzalez	October 11, 1988 (aged 20)	DF	26	26	1	1	4	0	
(United States)	6	Eddie Lewis	May 17, 1974 (aged 34)	MF	21	23	2	4	4	2	
(United States)	7	Chris Klein	January 4, 1976 (aged 33)	MF	9	26	0	1	1	0	
(Ukraine)	8	Dema Kovalenko	August 28, 1977 (aged 31)	MF	13	13	0	2	2	1	
(United States)	9	Jovan Kirovski	March 18, 1976 (aged 33)	FW	13	19	2	1	3	0	
(United States)	10	Landon Donovan	March 4, 1982 (aged 27)	FW	20	21	10	6	1	0	
(United States)	11	Alecko Eskandarian	July 9, 1982 (aged 26)	FW	3	3	2	0	2	0	
(United States)	14	Edson Buddle	May 21, 1981 (aged 27)	FW	9	15	5	0	1	0	
(Jamaica)	15	Stefani Miglioranzi	September 20, 1977 (aged 31)	MF	19	22	0	0	4	0	
(United States)	16	Gregg Berhalter	August 1, 1973 (aged 35)	DF	22	22	0	0	3	2	
(United States)	17	Tristan Bowen	January 31, 1991 (aged 18)	FW	0	1	0	0	0	0	
(United States)	18	Mike Magee	September 2, 1984 (aged 24)	MF	17	20	2	6	3	0	
(United States)	19	Josh Tudela*	March 13, 1984 (aged 25)	MF	8	8	0	0	1	0	
(United States)	20	A. J. DeLaGarza	November 4, 1987 (aged 21)	DF	19	20	1	1	2	0	
(United States)	21	Alan Gordon	October 16, 1981 (aged 27)	FW	13	19	3	3	3	1	
(United States)	22	Tony Sanneh	June 1, 1971 (aged 37)	DF	5	13	0	0	2	0	
(England)	23	David Beckham	May 2, 1975 (aged 33)	MF	11	11	2	3	1	1	
(United States)	27	Bryan Jordan	September 13, 1985 (aged 23)	FW	1	17	1	0	2	0	
(United States)	28	Sean Franklin	March 21, 1985 (aged 23)	DF	9	9	0	1	0	0	
(England)	30	Kyle Patterson	January 6, 1986 (aged 23)	MF	2	3	0	1	0	0	
(Trinidad and Tobago)	33	Chris Birchall	May 5, 1984 (aged 24)	MF	2	5	0	1	0	0	
							33	33	40	7	

* = Not currently part of team.

=== Goalkeepers ===
Nat	No	Player	Age	Starts	Apps	GA	GAA	CS	Acquired
(Jamaica)	1	Donovan Ricketts	July 6, 1977 (aged 31)	22	22	24	1.13	6	
(United States)	12	Josh Saunders	March 2, 1981 (aged 28)	4	6	5	1.06	2	
						29	1.12	9	

== Recognition ==
MLS All-Stars

- Landon Donovan - FW - First XI

MLS Player of the Week

- Donovan Ricketts - Week 4 - SHO, 5 SVS

MLS Player of the Month

- Landon Donovan - July - 1 G, 2 A, Galaxy 3-0-1 in July

MLS Goal of the Week

- Landon Donovan - Week 21 - 21'

MLS Save of the Week

- Donovan Ricketts - Week 14 - 14'
- Josh Saunders - Week 16 - 73'
- Donovan Ricketts - Week 18 - 42'

== Club ==
=== Management ===
Position	Staff
General Manager/head coach	(United States) Bruce Arena
Associate head coach	(United States) Dave Sarachan
Assistant Coach	(England) Trevor James
Assistant Coach	(United States) Cobi Jones
Goalkeeper Coach	(United States) Ian Feuer
Head Athletic trainer	(United States) Armando Rivas
Assistant Athletic trainer	(United States) Cecelia Gutierrez
Equipment manager	(Mexico) Raul Vargas

Last updated: April 18, 2009
Source: Los Angeles Galaxy

=== Other information ===
Owner	(United States) Philip Anschutz (AEG)
Ground (capacity and dimensions)	The Home Depot Center (27,000 / N/A)

Source: Los Angeles Galaxy

== Competitions ==
=== Overall ===
Competition	Started round	Current position / round	Final position / round	First match	Last match
MLS	—	—		March 21, 2009	

Updated to match played April 15, 2008
Source: Competitions

=== Major League Soccer ===
==== Standings ====
Pos	Team	Pld	W	L	T	GF	GA	GD	Pts	Qualification
1	LA Galaxy	30	12	6	12	36	31	+5	48	MLS Cup Playoffs
2	Houston Dynamo	30	13	8	9	39	29	+10	48	MLS Cup Playoffs
3	Seattle Sounders FC	30	12	7	11	38	29	+9	47	MLS Cup Playoffs
4	Chivas USA	30	13	11	6	34	31	+3	45	MLS Cup Playoffs
5	Real Salt Lake	30	11	12	7	43	35	+8	40	MLS Cup Playoffs
6	Colorado Rapids	30	10	10	10	42	38	+4	40	
7	FC Dallas	30	11	13	6	50	47	+3	39	
8	San Jose Earthquakes	30	7	14	9	36	50	−14	30	

Source: MLS

Pos	Team	Pld	W	L	T	GF	GA	GD	Pts	Qualification
1	Columbus Crew (S)	30	13	7	10	41	31	+10	49	CONCACAF Champions League
2	LA Galaxy	30	12	6	12	36	31	+5	48	CONCACAF Champions League
3	Houston Dynamo	30	13	8	9	39	29	+10	48	North American SuperLiga
4	Seattle Sounders FC	30	12	7	11	38	29	+9	47	CONCACAF Champions League
5	Chicago Fire	30	11	7	12	39	34	+5	45	North American SuperLiga
6	Chivas USA	30	13	11	6	34	31	+3	45	North American SuperLiga
7	New England Revolution	30	11	10	9	33	37	−4	42	North American SuperLiga
8	Real Salt Lake (C)	30	11	12	7	43	35	+8	40	CONCACAF Champions League
9	Colorado Rapids	30	10	10	10	42	38	+4	40	
10	D.C. United	30	9	8	13	43	44	−1	40	
11	FC Dallas	30	11	13	6	50	47	+3	39	
12	Toronto FC	30	10	11	9	37	46	−9	39	CONCACAF Champions League
13	Kansas City Wizards	30	8	13	9	33	42	−9	33	
14	San Jose Earthquakes	30	7	14	9	36	50	−14	30	
15	New York Red Bulls	30	5	19	6	27	47	−20	21	

Source: MLS
Rules for classification: 1) points; 2) head-to-head record; 3) goal difference; 4) number of goals scored
(C) Champions; (S) Supporters' Shield

==== Results summary ====
Overall								Home						Away					
Pld	Pts	W	L	T	GF	GA	GD	W	L	T	GF	GA	GD	W	L	T	GF	GA	GD
30	48	12	6	12	36	31	+5	7	4	4	18	17	+1	5	2	8	18	14	+4

Last updated: October 25, 2009
Source: Major League Soccer
Pld = Matches played; Pts = Points; W = Matches won; T = Matches tied; L = Matches lost; GF = Goals for; GA = Goals against; GD = Goal difference

Round	1	2	3	4	5	6	7	8	9	10	11	12	13	14	15	16	17	18	19	20	21	22	23	24	25	26	27	28	29	30
Stadium	H	H	H	A	A	H	A	A	H	A	H	A	H	A	H	H	A	A	A	A	H	A	A	H	H	H	A	H	A	H
Result	T	L	T	T	T	W	T	T	T	T	T	W	L	L	W	W	W	W	T	W	L	W	T	W	L	W	L	W	T	W

Updated to match(es) played on October 25, 2009. Source: Los Angeles Galaxy
A = Away; H = Home; W = Win; L = Loss; T = Tie

== Matches ==
Win Tie Loss

=== Pan-Pacific Championship ===
February 18, 2009	Los Angeles Galaxy (United States)	2–0	(Japan) Oita Trinita	Carson, California
	Buddle 44'; Kirovski 53' (pen.)	Report		Stadium: The Home Depot Center

February 21, 2009	Los Angeles Galaxy (United States)	1–1 (2–4 p)	(South Korea) Suwon Bluewings	Carson, California
	Magee 89' (pen.)	Report	Franklin 39' (o.g.)	Stadium: The Home Depot Center
	Penalties
	Buddle (penalty missed); Klein (penalty scored); Magee (penalty scored); Patterson (penalty missed)		(penalty scored) Edu; (penalty scored) Sang-Min; (penalty scored) Kil-Hoon; (penalty scored) Sung-Hwan

=== Phoenix Soccer Classico ===
March 14, 2009	Chicago Fire	1–1	Los Angeles Galaxy	Tempe, Arizona
	Pappa 30'	Report	Tudela 4'	Stadium: Sun Devil Stadium; Attendance: 8,614

=== International friendlies ===
June 9, 2009	Los Angeles Galaxy	1–0	Herediano	Carson, California
	Buddle 12'; Griffin (yellow card) 66'; Patterson (yellow card) 91'	Report		Stadium: The Home Depot Center; Attendance: 3,657; Referee: Alejandro Mariscal

July 20, 2009	Los Angeles Galaxy	2–2	Milan	Carson, California
	Gordon 30'; Jordan 64'	Report	Silva 16'; Inzaghi 60'	Stadium: The Home Depot Center; Attendance: 27,000; Referee: Silviu Petrescu

August 1, 2009	Los Angeles Galaxy	1–2	Barcelona	Pasadena, California
	Beckham 45'; Gordon (yellow card) 54'	Report	Pedro 11'; Touré (yellow card) 44'; Jeffrén 67'	Stadium: Rose Bowl; Attendance: 93,137; Referee: Baldomero Toledo

=== MLS regular season ===
March 22, 2009	Los Angeles Galaxy	2–2	D.C. United	Carson, California
	Donovan 80' (pen.); Donovan 85'	Report	Gomez 44'; Pontius 62'	Stadium: The Home Depot Center; Attendance: 18,013; Referee: Jair Marrufo

April 4, 2009	Los Angeles Galaxy	2–3	Colorado Rapids	Carson, California
	Gonzalez 37'; Gordon 48'	Report	Casey 1'; Gibbs (yellow card) 46+'; Casey 49'; Casey (yellow card) 63'; Ballouchy (yellow card) 66'; Casey 84'	Stadium: The Home Depot Center; Attendance: 16,709; Referee: Michael Kennedy

April 11, 2009	Los Angeles Galaxy	0–0	Chivas USA	Carson, California
	Miglioranzi (yellow card) 19'; Lewis (yellow card) 26'; Gordon (yellow card) 68' (yellow-red card) 71'; Berhalter (red card) 79'	Report	Nagamura (yellow card) 25' (yellow-red card) 45'; Kljestan (yellow card) 33'; Thomas (yellow card) 36'	Stadium: The Home Depot Center; Attendance: 23,317; Referee: Tim Weyland

April 18, 2009	San Jose Earthquakes	1 - 1	Los Angeles Galaxy	Santa Clara, California
	Campos 5'; Corrales (yellow card) 67'; Garcia (yellow card) 90'; Amarikwa (yellow card) 92+'	Report	Kovalenko (yellow card) 25'; Miglioranzi (yellow card) 73'; Jordan 76'	Stadium: Buck Shaw Stadium; Attendance: 15,463; Referee: Alex Prus

April 25, 2009	Colorado Rapids	1–1	Los Angeles Galaxy	Commerce City, Colorado
	Clark 60'	Report	Donovan 82'	Stadium: Dick's Sporting Goods Park; Attendance: 12,180; Referee: Alex Prus

May 2, 2009	Los Angeles Galaxy	1–0	New York Red Bulls	Carson, California
	Donovan 4' (pen.)	Report	Johnson (yellow card) 76'	Stadium: The Home Depot Center; Attendance: Abiodun Okulaja; Referee: 21,006

May 6, 2009	Real Salt Lake	2–2	Los Angeles Galaxy	Sandy, Utah
	Mathis (yellow card) 7'; Findley 34'; Johnson 92+' (pen.)	Report	Donovan 91+' (pen.); Magee 94+'	Stadium: Rio Tinto Stadium; Attendance: 16,155; Referee: Michael Kennedy

May 10, 2009	Seattle Sounders FC	1–1	Los Angeles Galaxy	Seattle, Washington
	Le Toux 22'; Evans (yellow card) 45'; Riley (yellow card) 57' (red card) 57'; Ljungberg (yellow card) 58'; Jaqua (yellow card) 80'	Report	Gordon (yellow card) 32'; Gordon 35'; Magee (yellow card) 59'; Sanneh (yellow card) 61'; Miglioranzi (yellow card) 83'	Stadium: Qwest Field; Attendance: 29,025; Referee: Tim Weyland

May 17, 2009	Los Angeles Galaxy	1–1	Columbus Crew	Carson, California
	Lewis (yellow card) 32'; Jordan (yellow card) 46'; Lewis 91+'	Report	Rogers (yellow card) 58'; Moreno (yellow card) 62'; Schelotto 70'; O'Rourke (yellow card) 86' (yellow-red card) 89'	Stadium: The Home Depot Center; Attendance: 16,649; Referee: Alex Prus

May 23, 2009	FC Dallas	1–1	Los Angeles Galaxy	Frisco, Texas
	Saragosa (red card) 25'; Moor 31'; Ricchetti (yellow card) 32'; Rocha (yellow card) 41'; Guarda (yellow card) 74'	Report	Donovan 3'; Lewis (yellow card) 26'; Gonzalez (yellow card) 33'; Tudela (yellow card) 42'	Stadium: Pizza Hut Park; Attendance: 9,595; Referee: Paul Ward

May 30, 2009	Los Angeles Galaxy	1–1	Kansas City Wizards	Carson, California
	DeLaGarza (yellow card) 57'; Berhalter (red card) 59'; Buddle 87'	Report	Conrad (yellow card) 47'; Arnaud (yellow card) 78'; Arnaud 84'; Watson (yellow card) 92'	Stadium: The Home Depot Center; Attendance: 19,673; Referee: Terry Vaughn

June 6, 2009	Toronto FC	1–2	Los Angeles Galaxy	Toronto, Ontario Canada
	Harmse (yellow card) 44'; Dichio 64'	Report	Gordon 5'; Gonzalez (yellow card) 9'; Senneh (yellow card) 31'; Buddle 77'	Stadium: BMO Field; Attendance: 20,753; Referee: Alex Prus

June 13, 2009	Los Angeles Galaxy	0–2	Real Salt Lake	Carson, California
	Gordon (yellow card) 46'; Kirovski (yellow card) 65'; Lewis (red card) 65'; Gonzalez (yellow card) 91+'	Report	Movsisyan 13'; Borchers 51'; Johnson (yellow card) 59'; Mathis (yellow card) 59'	Stadium: The Home Depot Center; Attendance: 19,718; Referee: Jasen Anno

June 20, 2009	San Jose Earthquakes	2–1	Los Angeles Galaxy	Oakland, California
	Campos 6' (pen.); Pitchkolan (yellow card) 24'; Johnson (yellow card) 48'; Johnson 54'; Huckerby (yellow card) 90'	Report	Kirovski (yellow card) 28'; Kirovski 65'	Stadium: Oakland–Alameda County Coliseum; Attendance: 17,128; Referee: Yader Reyes

June 28, 2009	Los Angeles Galaxy	1–0	Houston Dynamo	Carson, California
	Dunivant 24'; Buddle (yellow card) 56'; Magee (yellow card) 89'	Report	Chabala (yellow card) 54'; Boswell (yellow card) 56'; Cameron (yellow card) 81'	Stadium: The Home Depot Center; Attendance: 17,938; Referee: Michael Kennedy

July 4, 2009	Los Angeles Galaxy	1–0	New England Revolution	Carson, California
	Eskandarian 8'; Berhalter (yellow card) 72'; Jordan (yellow card) 87'	Report	Mansally (yellow card) 50'; Thompson (yellow card) 61'; Phelan (yellow card) 61'; Reis (yellow card) 87'	Stadium: The Home Depot Center; Attendance: 20,609; Referee: Mark Geiger

July 11, 2009	Chivas USA	0–1	Los Angeles Galaxy	Carson, California
		Report	Buddle 30'; Eskandarian (yellow card) 66'	Stadium: The Home Depot Center; Attendance: 23,409; Referee: Ricardo Salazar

July 16, 2009	New York Red Bulls	1–3	Los Angeles Galaxy	East Rutherford, New Jersey
	Angel 87' (pen.); Rojas (yellow card) 90'	Report	Eskandarian 3'; Berhalter (yellow card) 10'; Eskandarian (yellow card) 28'; Donovan 31'; Lewis 45'	Stadium: Giants Stadium; Attendance: 23,238; Referee: Shane Moody

July 25, 2009	Kansas City Wizards	1–1	Los Angeles Galaxy	Kansas City, Kansas
	López 26'	Report	Donovan 33'; Gonzalez (yellow card) 51'	Stadium: CommunityAmerica Ballpark; Attendance: 11,906; Referee: Terry Vaughn

August 8, 2009	New England Revolution	1–2	Los Angeles Galaxy	Foxborough, Massachusetts
	Mansally (yellow card) 74'; Ralston 83'	Report	Donovan 21'; Kirovski 52'; Lewis (yellow card) 77'	Stadium: Gillette Stadium; Attendance: 26,623; Referee: Jorge Gonzalez

August 15, 2009	Los Angeles Galaxy	0–2	Seattle Sounders FC	Carson, California
20:00 PST	DeLaGarza (yellow card) 14'; Beckham (red card) 17'; Lewis (red card) 79'; Kirovski (yellow card) 94+'	Report	Zakuani 22'; Montero 54'; Marshall (yellow card) 65' (yellow-red card) 76'; Montero (yellow card) 81'	Stadium: The Home Depot Center; Attendance: 20,162; Referee: Ricardo Salazar

August 19, 2009	Chicago Fire	0–2	Los Angeles Galaxy	Bridgeview, Illinois
	Thorrington (yellow card) 60'	Report	Magee 23'; Miglioranzi (yellow card) 43'; Donovan 54'; Ricketts (yellow card) 72'	Stadium: Toyota Park; Attendance: 20,000; Referee: Silviu Petrescu

August 22, 2009	D.C. United	0–0	Los Angeles Galaxy	Washington, D.C.
	Olsen (yellow card) 10'; Wallace (yellow card) 68'	Report	Donovan (yellow card) 31'; Magee (yellow card) 54'	Stadium: RFK Memorial Stadium; Attendance: 22,134; Referee: Mark Geiger

August 29, 2009	Los Angeles Galaxy	1–0	Chivas USA	Carson, California
	Beckham 80'; Klein (yellow card) 90'	Report	Saragosa (yellow card) 23'; Galindo (red card) 82'; Nagamura (yellow card) 92'	Stadium: The Home Depot Center; Attendance: 27,000; Referee: Baldomero Toledo

September 12, 2009	Los Angeles Galaxy	3–6	FC Dallas	Carson, California
	Berhalter (yellow card) 6'; Benitez 26' (o.g.); DeLaGarza 42'; Buddle 90'	Report	van den Bergh 8'; Cunningham 25'; Ferreira (yellow card) 31'; Ihemelu (yellow card) 33'; McCarty 71'; Harris 82'; Ferreira 83'; Cunningham 86'	Stadium: The Home Depot Center; Attendance: 18,148; Referee: Hilario Grajeda

September 19, 2009	Los Angeles Galaxy	2–0	Toronto FC	Carson, California
	Beckham 9'; Beckham (yellow card) 64'; Buddle 83'	Report	Guzman (yellow card) 24'; Guevara (yellow card) 64'; Garcia (yellow card) 67'	Stadium: The Home Depot Center; Attendance: 18,619; Referee: Kevin Stott

September 26, 2009	Columbus Crew	2–0	Los Angeles Galaxy	Columbus, Ohio
	Hejduk (yellow card) 28'; Gaven 33'; Lenhart 59'; Brunner (yellow card) 62'; Moreno (yellow card) 69'; Lenhart (yellow card) 75'	Report	Kirovski (yellow card) 56'; Birchall (yellow card) 71'; Berhalter (yellow card) 73'; Gordon (yellow card) 93+'	Stadium: Columbus Crew Stadium; Attendance: 20,966; Referee: Terry Vaughn

October 2, 2009	Los Angeles Galaxy	1–0	Chicago Fire	Carson, California
	Donovan 42'; Birchall (yellow card) 45'; Klein (yellow card) 63'	Report		Stadium: The Home Depot Center; Attendance: 21,679; Referee: Alex Prus

October 18, 2009	Houston Dynamo	0–0	Los Angeles Galaxy	Houston, Texas, United States
	Ching (yellow card) 84' (yellow-red card) 84'; Oduro (yellow card) 87'	Report	Beckham (yellow card) 84'; Gordon (yellow card) 91+'	Stadium: Robertson Stadium; Attendance: 29,470; Referee: Kevin Stott

October 24, 2009	Los Angeles Galaxy	2–0	San Jose Earthquakes	Carson, California
	Burling 24' (o.g.); Donovan 77'; Gonzalez (yellow card) 78'	Report	Convey (yellow card) 17'; Alvarez (yellow card) 69'	Stadium: The Home Depot Center; Attendance: 27,000; Referee: Silviu Petrescu

=== MLS playoffs ===
November 1, 2009 Conf. Semifinals	Chivas USA	2–2	Los Angeles Galaxy	Carson, California
13:00 PST	Santos 4'; Galindo 50'; Saragosa (yellow card) 81'	Report	Magee 14'; Birchall (yellow card) 27'; Donovan 41'	Stadium: The Home Depot Center; Attendance: 25,218; Referee: Kevin Stott

November 8, 2009 Conf. Semifinals	Los Angeles Galaxy	1–0	Chivas USA	Carson, California
16:30 PST	Franklin (yellow card) 60'; Donovan 73' (pen.)	Report	Talley (yellow card) 38'; Thornton (yellow card) 72'; Nagamura (yellow card) 78'; Cuesta (yellow card) 78'; Kljestan (yellow card) 94+'	Stadium: The Home Depot Center; Attendance: 27,000; Referee: Ricardo Salazar

November 13, 2009 Conf. Finals	Los Angeles Galaxy	2–0 (a.e.t.)	Houston Dynamo	Carson, California
20:00 PST	Kovalenko (yellow card) 77'; Donovan (yellow card) 89'; Berhalter 103'; Donovan 109' (pen.)	Report	Mullan (yellow card) 26'; Boswell (yellow card) 111'; Landín (yellow card) 119'	Stadium: Home Depot Center; Attendance: 25,373; Referee: Terry Vaughn

November 22, 2009 Final	Los Angeles Galaxy	1–1 (a.e.t.) (4–5 p)	Real Salt Lake	Seattle, Washington
5:30 p.m. PST	Birchall (yellow card) 39'; Magee 41'	Report	Johnson (yellow card) 14'; Findley 64'	Stadium: Qwest Field; Attendance: 46,011; Referee: Kevin Stott
	Penalties
	Beckham (penalty scored); Berhalter (penalty scored); Kirovski (penalty missed); Donovan (penalty missed); Magee (penalty scored); Klein (penalty scored); Buddle (penalty missed)		Mathis (penalty scored); Findley (penalty scored); Beckerman (penalty missed); Grabavoy (penalty scored); Williams (penalty missed); Wingert (penalty scored); Russell (penalty scored)

=== U.S. Open Cup qualification ===
April 7, 2009 Qualification	Los Angeles Galaxy	0–0 (a.e.t.) (2–4 p)	Colorado Rapids	Carson, California
	Gonzalez (yellow card) 41'; Marshall (yellow card) 63'; Magee (yellow card) 109'	Report	Dalby (red card) 36'	Stadium: The Home Depot Center; Attendance: 6,219; Referee: Abiodun Okulaja
	Penalties
	Gordon (penalty scored); Klein (penalty missed); Jordan (penalty scored); Magee (penalty missed)		Cummings (penalty scored); Ballouchy (penalty scored); Clark (penalty scored); Ihemelu (penalty scored)
