= Daniel Pearl (disambiguation) =

Daniel Pearl (1963–2002) was an American journalist beheaded in Karachi, Pakistan.

Daniel Pearl may also refer to:

- Daniel Pearl (cinematographer) (born 1951), American cinematographer
- Daniel Pearl Magnet High School, Lake Balboa, Los Angeles, California
