= Psychiatric assistance dog =

Type of service dog

A psychiatric assistance dog or psychiatric service dog is a sub-category of assistance dog trained to assist their handler with a psychiatric disability or a mental disability, such as obsessive-compulsive disorder, post-traumatic stress disorder, schizophrenia, depression, anxiety, ADHD, and bipolar disorder.

A psychiatric assistance dog can assist their handler by providing a safe presence that grounds them; the dog may perhaps lean on the person to provide a calming pressure.

== Training ==
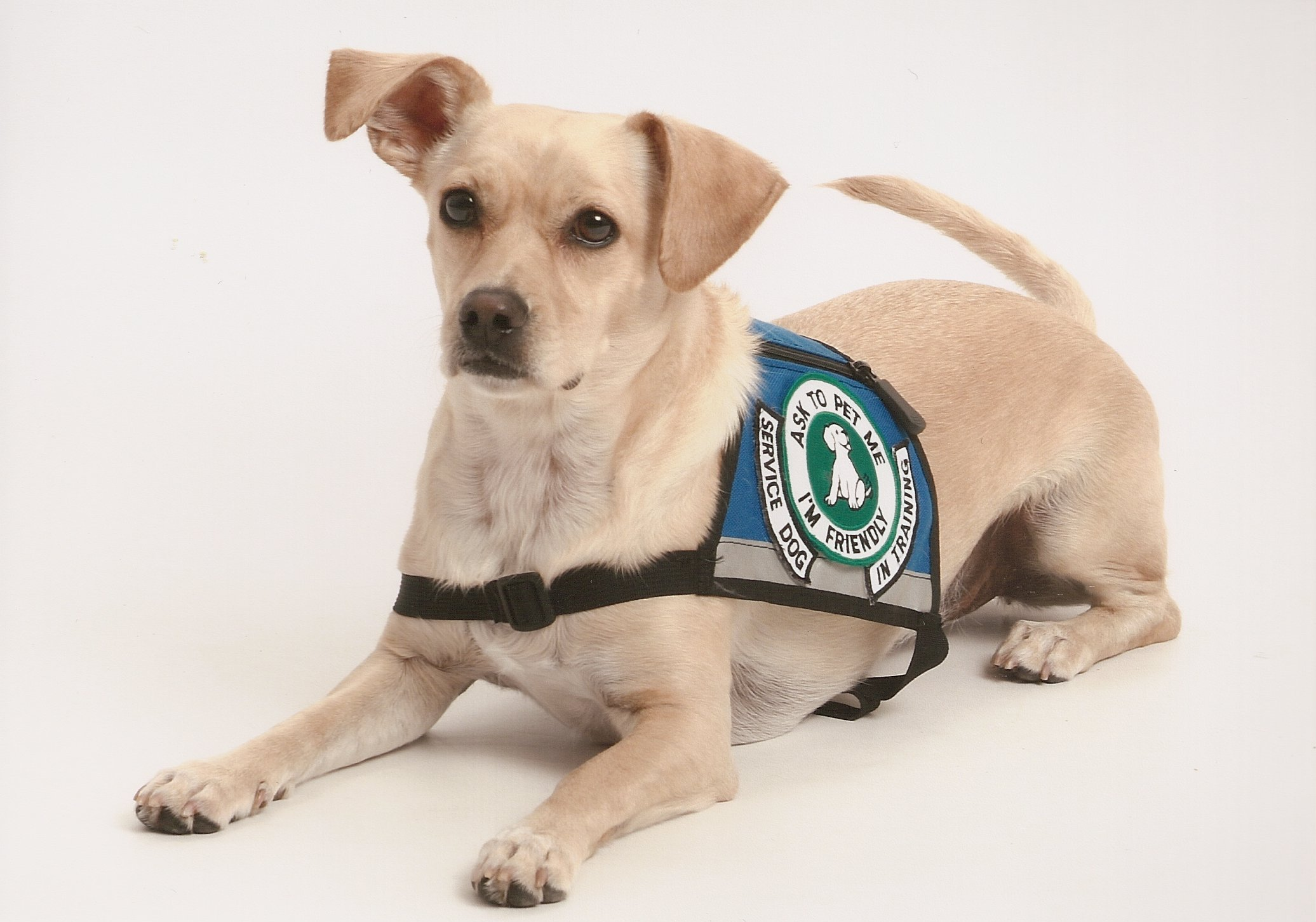
A psychiatric service dog in training

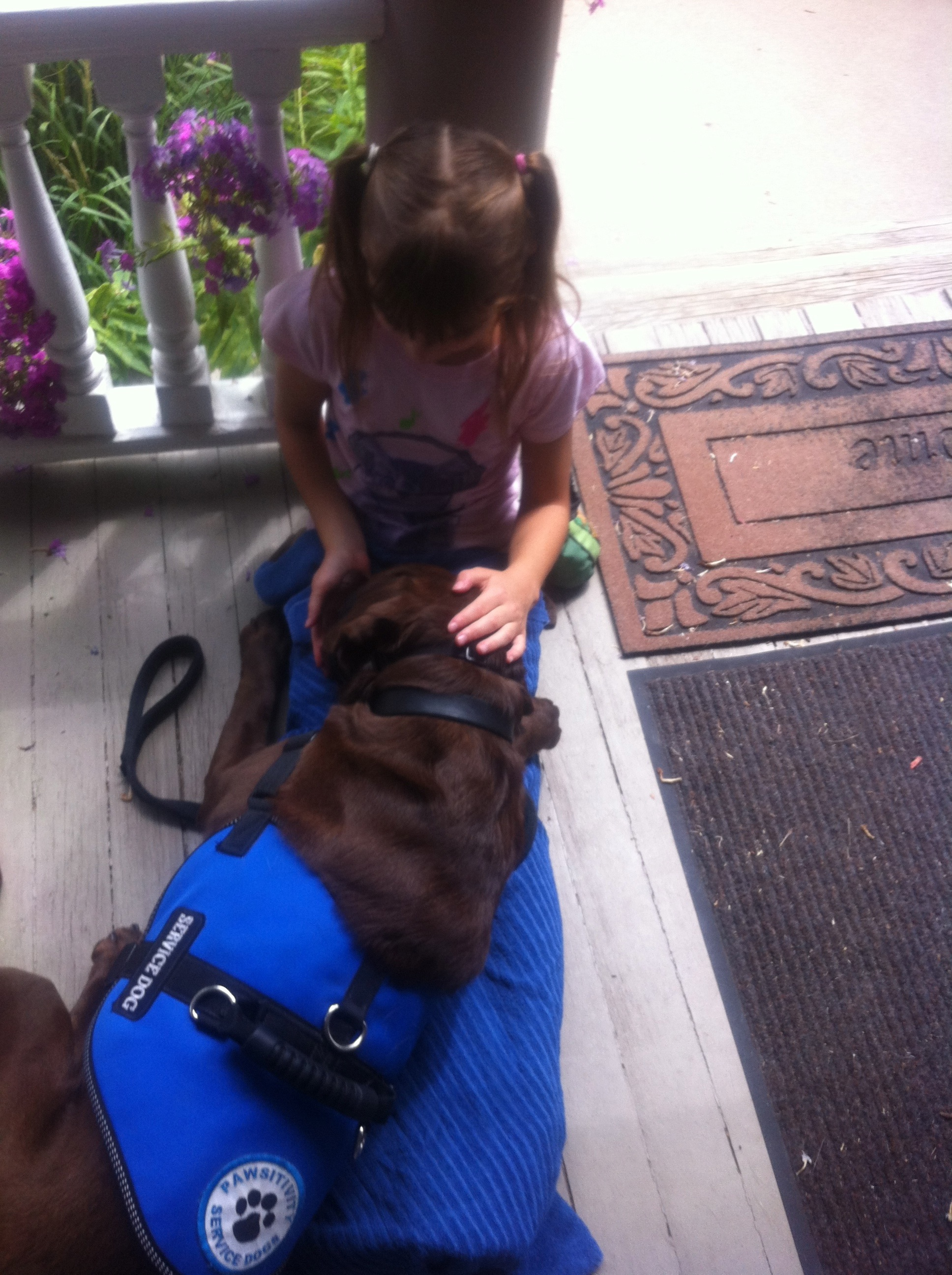
Service dog being trained to run over and lie in handler's lap to ground handler on command.

Like all assistance dogs, a psychiatric assistance dog is individually trained to do work or perform tasks that mitigate their handler's disability. Training to mitigate a psychiatric disability may include providing environmental assessment (in such cases as paranoia or hallucinations), signaling behaviors (such as interrupting repetitive or injurious behaviors), reminding the handler to take medication, retrieving objects, guiding the handler from stressful situations, or acting as a brace if the handler becomes dizzy. Moreover, the dog can be an extremely useful companion in any controlled training concerning cognitive functions, such as walking the dog.

Many psychiatric assistance dogs are trained by the person who will become the handler— either with or without the help of a professional trainer. Others are trained by assistance or service dog programs. Assistance dog organizations are increasingly recognizing the need for dogs to help individuals with psychiatric disabilities, and there are even organizations dedicated specifically to supporting psychiatric assistance dog handlers.

== Accessibility ==
In the US, the Air Carrier Access Act has permitted psychiatric service dogs to travel in the cabin with their handler. Due to negative incidents with service dogs and emotional support animals, from 2018 through 2020 there has been a push to limit or restrict dogs on US flights. During this time the act treated psychiatric service dogs and emotional support animals the same and required the handler to provide paperwork for their dog. In December 2020, a revision of the act meant that the two were no longer treated the same, and psychiatric service dogs were treated equally to other types of service dogs.

While some organizations offer certification or identification cards for service dogs, there is no federally mandated or recognized certification process for service dogs in the US. The Americans with Disabilities Act (ADA) does not require service dogs to be registered or certified. Handlers are not legally obligated to obtain or carry any specific documentation for their Psychiatric Service Dogs. However, having such identification can be helpful in situations where proof of the dog's training and status may be required, such as when traveling or accessing certain public accommodations.

== See also ==
- Assistance dog
- Autism assistance dog
