= SCID =

SCID may stand for:

== Computing ==
- Shane's Chess Information Database, a chess database to maintain, view and replay chess games
- Source code in database, program source code stored in a database with structural relations reflecting the language syntax and program structure
- Synchronous optical networking, carrier identification

== Health ==
- Severe combined immunodeficiency, a genetic disorder in which the immune system fails to develop
  - Severe combined immunodeficiency (non-human), a variation in nonhumans
- Structured Clinical Interview for DSM
- SCI/D, referring to spinal cord injury and spinal cord disorder

== Other ==
- Doctor of Science (Sci.D)
