= Jose Botello =

American soccer player and coach (born 1976)

Personal information
- Full name: Jose Botello
- Date of birth: April 24, 1976 (age 50)
- Place of birth: Los Angeles, California, U.S.
- Height: 6 ft 0 in (1.83 m)
- Position: Forward

Team information
- Current team: Hollywood United Hitmen (head coach)

Youth career
- 1994–1995: East Los Angeles Huskies
- 1996: Los Angeles Golden Eagles

Senior career*
Years	Team	Apps	(Gls)
1997–1999	Los Angeles Galaxy	10	(0)
1997	→ Orange County Zodiac (loan)	9	(1)
1998	→ MLS Pro 40 (loan)	16	(2)
1999	→ MLS Pro 40 (loan)	9	(13)
1999	→ Orange County Zodiac (loan)	1	(0)
2000	Orange County Waves		
2001–2003	Inter Tijuana		

Managerial career
- 2010–: Hollywood United Hitmen
- * Club domestic league appearances and goals as of 6 April 2009

Jose Botello (born April 24, 1976) is an American retired soccer player. He is currently the head coach of the Hollywood United Hitmen in the USL Premier Development League.

== Career ==
=== College ===
Botello played college soccer at East Los Angeles College and at California State University, Los Angeles.

=== Professional ===
Botello signed a Project-40 contract with Major League Soccer in 1997, and was assigned to the Los Angeles Galaxy. He played in 10 MLS games for Galaxy in his three years with the team, but never truly established himself as a regular starter, and was waived at the end of the 1999 season. After being released by Galaxy, Botello played for Orange County Waves in the old A-League, and for Inter Tijuana in Mexico, before retiring from top flight competitive soccer in the mid-2000s. He went on to play for the L.A. Blues team in various amateur leagues in the Los Angeles area, and won several local cups and leagues between 2005 and 2009.

=== Coaching ===
Botello worked a coach for Southern California youth soccer organization Legends FC, alongside fellow ex-Galaxy player Alex Bengard. He was hired as head coach of the Hollywood United Hitmen in the USL Premier Development League in 2010.
