= Mike Magee (soccer) =

American soccer player

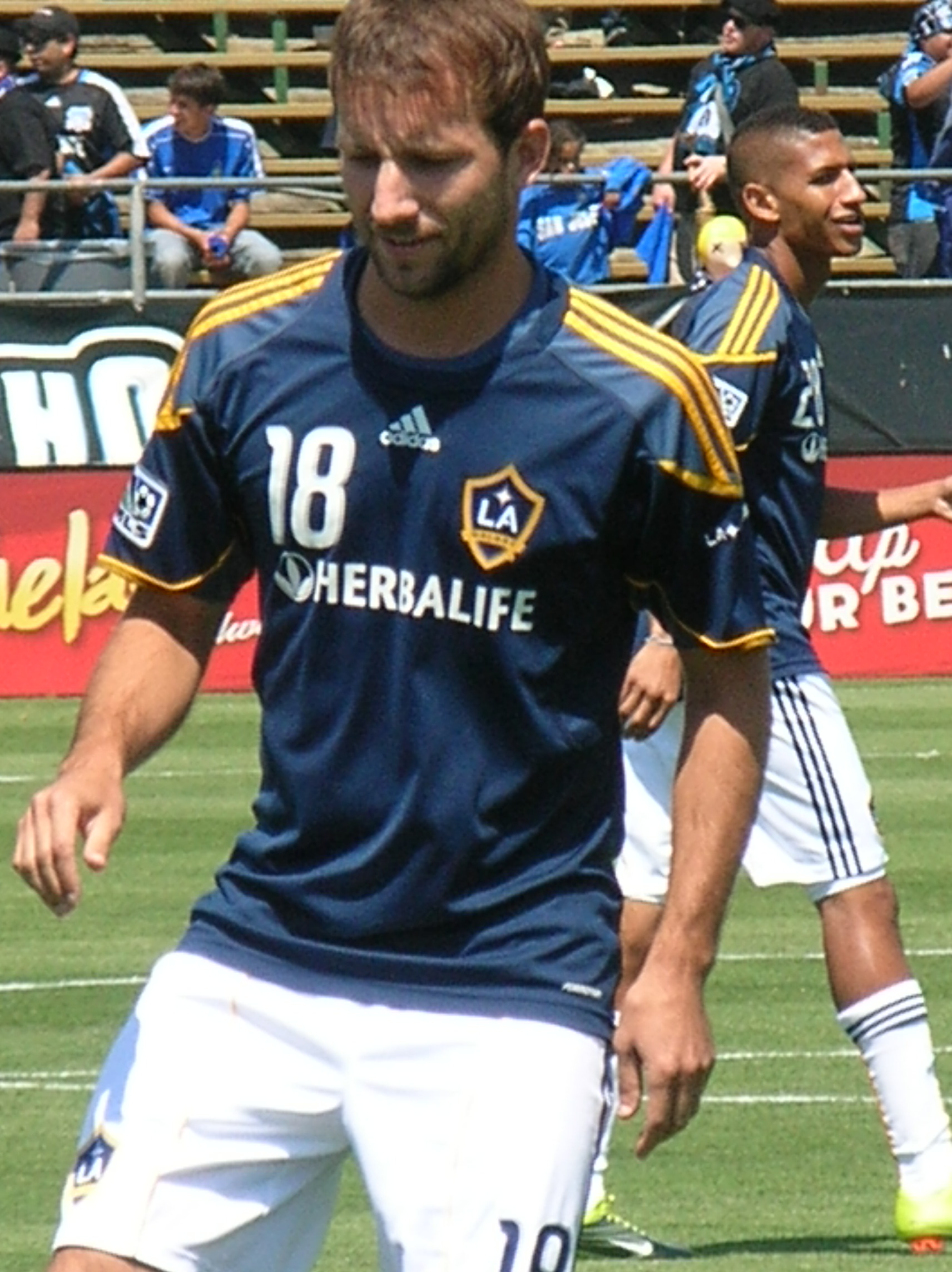
- Magee with the LA Galaxy in 2010

Personal information
- Date of birth: September 2, 1984 (age 42)
- Place of birth: Elmhurst, Illinois, United States
- Height: 5 ft 10 in (1.78 m)
- Positions: Second striker; attacking midfielder

Youth career
- 2000–2001: IMG Soccer Academy

Senior career*
Years	Team	Apps	(Gls)
2003–2008	New York Red Bulls	130	(23)
2009–2013	LA Galaxy	105	(19)
2013–2015	Chicago Fire	51	(22)
2015	→ Saint Louis FC (loan)	1	(0)
2016	LA Galaxy	30	(6)
Total		317	(70)

International career^{‡}
2001	United States U17	3	(1)
2003	United States U20	2	(1)
- * Club domestic league appearances and goals as of November 11, 2016 ‡ National team caps and goals as of September 23, 2012

Michael Magee (born September 2, 1984) is an American former soccer player who last played for LA Galaxy in Major League Soccer as a forward. In the 2013 season with the Chicago Fire, Magee scored 21 goals and was named the MLS MVP.

== Club career ==
=== MetroStars ===
Magee graduated from USSF's Bradenton Academy he entered the 2003 MLS SuperDraft, where the MetroStars traded the previous year's third overall selection, Brad Davis, to acquire Magee with the fourth overall pick.

With Metro coach Bob Bradley familiar with Magee from his youth soccer days, the youngster quickly stepped into the Metro lineup, and played every game of the 2003 season except the meaningless finale. He became the youngest player in team history to start a game and score a goal. He scored seven goals, nearing the rookie record, which included a couple of game-winning and game-tying efforts.

When the MetroStars signed a trio of foreign strikers before the 2004 season, Magee struggled for playing time early on. But he soon found a new niche as an attacking midfielder, as his skill on the ball, leadership, precise passing, and overall intelligence made him an important part of the Metro team. Magee ended up with three goals on the season, one of them in the 90th minute to give the Metros a 2–1 win over Los Angeles Galaxy. He scored five in 2005, adding five assists. Magee followed that with three goals in an injury-filled 2006. Magee's injury woes continued in 2007 as he was limited to 7 league matches. The 2008 season saw Magee receive significant playing time as an attacking midfielder, but it was apparent that he was not fully recovered from his injuries. He was then moved to his natural forward position and had a resurgence as he scored in 3 consecutive matches, helping the club to three straight wins. He ended the 2008 season scoring five key goals, helping the club reach the MLS Playoffs.

=== LA Galaxy ===
Magee was traded to Los Angeles Galaxy in January 2009 in exchange for a 2nd round pick in the 2010 MLS SuperDraft. In his first season with Los Angeles, Magee appeared in 23 league matches scoring 2 goals. During the 2009 MLS Cup Playoffs Magee started all 4 of the team's playoff matches scoring two goals in helping lead the club to the MLS Cup Final. At the MLS 2009 Cup Final Magee scored the Galaxy's only goal but the team ended up losing during an overtime penalty shoot out.

Magee made his first professional appearance as a goalkeeper on June 25, 2011, moving to the position in the 43rd minute of a match against San Jose Earthquakes, after starting goalkeeper Donovan Ricketts was injured and reserve goalkeeper Josh Saunders received a red card for an elbow to the face of Steven Lenhart. Magee made 4 saves, including a late stop on a 1-v-1 against Lenhart, preserving a clean sheet for the Galaxy in a 0–0 draw. It was the first time Magee had played in goal at any level of soccer. Magee had his most productive season during the 2011 campaign scoring 10 goals in all competitions for the Galaxy including 3 in the MLS playoffs, helping the Galaxy to capture the 2011 MLS Cup.

Magee has become LA's "Mr. November" due to his repeated ability to deliver goals and in form clutch performances in the post-season, having scored 8 goals in his 15 playoff matches for the team.

=== Chicago Fire ===
On May 24, 2013, Magee was traded to Chicago Fire for the MLS rights to Robbie Rogers. He made an immediate impact with the club, scoring 7 goals in his first 7 matches across all competitions. He won the June Player of the Month Award. The Fire missed the playoffs by three goals and Magee lost to Camilo Sanvezzo for the MLS Golden Boot. Camilo had 22 goals and 6 assists, while Magee had 21 goals and 4 assists. On November 20, Magee along with Robbie Keane and Marco Di Vaio, was nominated for the MVP Award. On December 5, he was named the MVP of MLS. Magee became the first Chicago Fire player ever to win the award.

In September 2014, Magee underwent a right hip surgery to address an injury of the labrum and to repair articular surface damage. He would miss eight months due to recovery. In May 2015, Magee was loaned to Chicago's USL affiliate, Saint Louis FC, to begin his on-field recovery from this injury.

=== Return to LA Galaxy ===
On January 14, 2016, the Galaxy announced that Magee would return after he became a free-agent.

== International career ==
Magee has spent time with various U.S. youth national Teams. He played in the 2003 FIFA World Youth Championship in the United Arab Emirates, scoring the game-winner against Paraguay.

In November 2013, Republic of Ireland national team captain Robbie Keane revealed that he would recommend Magee to Martin O'Neill as a possible call-up.

Magee was called up by Jürgen Klinsmann for the 2014 January Camp. However, he was left out of the lineup on February 1 against South Korea due to food poisoning.

== Personal life ==
Magee spent some of his earliest years living in Elmhurst, Illinois before moving away, and has lived considerable time in South Barrington. He played AYSO; one year, his team name was the "Green Slimers".

Magee and his wife, Kristen Pizzolato were married in 2012, had a daughter in 2010 and a son in 2015.

In 2018, Magee became the owner of Sneaky Fox Spirits and Sneaky Clean Hand Sanitizer in 2020.

== Career statistics ==
As of July 24, 2016

Club	Season	League			Cup		Playoffs		Continental		Total	
Club	Season	Division	Apps	Goals	Apps	Goals	Apps	Goals	Apps	Goals	Apps	Goals
New York Red Bulls	2003	MLS	29	7	5	0	2	0	—		36	7
New York Red Bulls	2004	MLS	22	3	-	-	-	-	—		22	3
New York Red Bulls	2005	MLS	29	5	1	0	-	-	—		30	5
New York Red Bulls	2006	MLS	17	3	1	0	1	0	—		19	3
New York Red Bulls	2007	MLS	7	0	-	-	-	-	—		7	0
New York Red Bulls	2008	MLS	26	5	1	0	-	-	—		27	5
Los Angeles Galaxy	2009	MLS	23	2	1	0	4	2	—		28	4
Los Angeles Galaxy	2010	MLS	16	1	-	-	3	0	1	0	20	1
Los Angeles Galaxy	2011	MLS	27	5	1	1	4	3	4	1	36	10
Los Angeles Galaxy	2012	MLS	29	5	1	0	5	3	3	1	38	9
Los Angeles Galaxy	2013	MLS	10	6	0	0	0	0	4	0	14	6
Chicago Fire	2013	MLS	22	15	4	3	-	-	—		26	18
Chicago Fire	2014	MLS	17	7	3	1	-	-	—		20	8
Chicago Fire	2015	MLS	12	0	2	2	-	-	—		14	2
Los Angeles Galaxy	2016	MLS	30	6	2	0	3	0	0	0	35	6
Career total		MLS	316	70	22	7	22	8	12	2	372	87

== Honors ==
Los Angeles Galaxy

- MLS Cup (2): 2011, 2012
- MLS Supporters' Shield (2): 2010, 2011
- MLS Western Conference Playoffs (3): 2009, 2011, 2012
- MLS Western Conference Regular Season (3): 2009, 2010, 2011
- MLS Player of the Month (1): March 2013
- MLS Player of the Week (2): 2011, 2013

Chicago Fire

- MLS Player of the Month (1): June 2013
- MLS Best XI (1): 2013
- MLS MVP (1): 2013
