= Henry Patrick Birmingham =

United States Army general

- Born: March 15, 1854
- Died: May 4, 1932 (aged 78)
- Education: University of Michigan
- Military career
- Rank: Brigadier general

Henry Patrick Birmingham (March 15, 1854 – May 4, 1932) was a surgeon and an American brigadier general active during World War I.

== Early life ==
Birmingham was born in Brooklyn, New York. He received his medical degree from the University of Michigan in 1876, and on February 18, 1881, he entered the army as an assistant surgeon of the Medical Corps.

== Career ==
Birmingham's first tours of duty were with the Fourth Cavalry in actions against the Apaches in the southwest. He was promoted to assistant surgeon on February 18, 1886.

During the Spanish–American War, he served in Puerto Rico and then in the Philippines. On June 4, 1898, he was promoted to major, brigade surgeon of volunteers, and on April 23, 1908, he was promoted to lieutenant colonel, Medical Corps.

In 1914, he was the chief surgeon of the Vera Cruz Expedition under General Frederick Funston. On October 2, 1917, Birmingham was promoted to brigadier general and the same year he received an honorary master's degree from the University of Michigan. During World War I, Birmingham was in charge of the ambulance service of the army and the gas defense service of the medical department. In 1918, he retired as a colonel, then went right back to active duty. In 1930, he retired by operation of law as a brigadier general.

== Death and legacy ==
Birmingham died at age 78 on May 4, 1932. He is buried at Arlington National Cemetery.

A World War II US Army Hospital called the Birmingham General Hospital from August 24, 1943, till March 31, 1946 in Van Nuys, California was named after him. The Hospital serviced troop returning home from the war. From 1946 to 1950 the hospital was named the Birmingham Veterans Administration Hospital. In 1952, the hospital was sold to the Los Angeles City Schools where it eventually became Birmingham High School.
