= Michael Erush =

American soccer player and coach

Personal information
- Full name: Michael Erush
- Date of birth: January 24, 1983 (age 43)
- Place of birth: Van Nuys, California, United States
- Height: 5 ft 11 in (1.80 m)
- Position: Defender

College career
Years	Team	Apps	(Gls)
2000–2003	Loyola Marymount Lions		

Senior career*
Years	Team	Apps	(Gls)
2002	Los Angeles Heroes		
2003	Orange County Blue Star	5	(0)
2004	Colorado Rapids	0	(0)
2005	Chivas USA	0	(0)
2006	Hapoel Ashkelon	0	(0)
2006	Miami FC	17	(0)
2007–2009	Hollywood United		
2010–	Orange County Blue Star	1	(0)

Managerial career
- 2007–2013: Loyola Marymount Lions (assistant)
- 2009: Hollywood United Hitmen
- 2010–????: Orange County Blue Star (assistant)
- 2014–2017: Loyola Marymount Lions (associate head coach)
- 2010–: United States Maccabiah team
- 2018–2021: Cal State LA Golden Eagles (assistant)
- 2022–: Cal State LA Golden Eagles
- * Club domestic league appearances and goals as of June 18, 2010

Michael Erush
Medal record

Representing United States

Football

Maccabiah Games
Silver medal – second place	2005 Maccabiah	Football

Michael Erush (born January 24, 1983) is a former professional soccer player who is currently the head coach of the men's team at California State University-Los Angeles.

He was inducted into the Birmingham Community Charter High School Athletic Hall of Fame, and the Loyola Marymount University Athletics Hall of Fame. Erush won a silver medal with Team USA at the 2005 Maccabiah Games in Israel.

In Major League Soccer, he played for the Colorado Rapids (2004), Chivas USA (2005), and Miami FC (2006). Erush played internationally with Hapoel Ashkelon F.C. in Israel, Lombard-Papa TFC in Hungary, and Olimpia Bălţi in Moldova. He was formerly a coach of the Loyola Marymount Lions soccer team.

== Early life and personal ==
Erush is the son of Russian immigrants; his father is Lazar Erush. He was born in North Hollywood, California, and raised in Van Nuys, California, and Sherman Oaks, California. He attended North Hollywood High School as well as Birmingham High School.

He earned a bachelor's degree from Loyola Marymount University, College of Business Administration (Business Management; '03), and an M.A. in Guidance and Counseling from Loyola Marymount University ('10).

On May 2, 2015, Erush proposed to Ally Siegel. The couple got married on July 16, 2016. They live in Studio City, California, with their two daughters.

== Playing career ==
=== Youth career ===
As a youth player, Erush played for the United States U-14, U-16, and U-18 National teams, and was team captain of the U-14 and U-16 teams from 1996 through 2000, and was part of the USMNT pool in 2001, but was never called up to the senior roster.

Erush was honored as the 1999 Los Angeles Times and Los Angeles Daily News All-Region Player of the Year, and was a 2000 NSCAA High School All-America selection from Birmingham Community Charter High School ('00). He was team captain as a junior and senior, three-time All-Northwest Conference, and two-time All-Valley and All-West Valley League, as well as All-America honorable mention as a senior. He was inducted into the Birmingham Community Charter Athletic Hall of Fame.

=== College ===
Erush was a Loyola Marymount University Lions men's soccer standout, a four-time All-West Coast Conference (WCC) selection (2000, 2001, 2002), was named First Team in 2003, and served as team captain during his junior and senior seasons. He was named First Team National Soccer Coaches Association of America All Far West Selection in 2002, and was named First Team All-America by the Jewish Sports Review in 2003. During his last three years, he helped the Lions advance to the NCAA Tournament, and in 2003 finished in a first-round bye and national seeding (#13) in the postseason. He was inducted into the Loyola Marymount Athletics Hall of Fame in 2017.

=== Professional ===
Erush played in Major League Soccer for the Colorado Rapids (2004), Chivas USA (2005), and Miami FC (2006). He played internationally for Hapoel Ashkelon F.C. in Israel, Lombard-Papa TFC in Hungary, and Olimpia Bălţi in Moldova.

=== International ===
In 2005 Erush competed on Team USA in the 2005 Maccabiah Games in Israel, where the team went on to win a silver medal.

== Coaching ==
In January 2007 Erush was hired as an assistant coach to Paul Krumpe with the men's Loyola Marymount Lions soccer team at Loyola Marymount University. In 2014, he was promoted to associate head coach, and remained in that position through 2018.

Erush, having played with the amateur Hollywood United team in Los Angeles for several years, was hired as the first-ever head coach of the Hollywood United Hitmen in the USL Premier Development League in 2009. He moved to become head coach of the Orange County Blue Star in 2010. That year he also headed up the USA team that competed at the Maccabiah Australia International Games, winning the silver medal. From 2009 to 2014 Erush also coached the South Bay Force and the Fram Soccer Club.

From 2011 to 2015, Erush was a United States Soccer Federation Southern California Scout, and evaluated, developed, and scouted youth players for the U.S. national teams. In 2014, he joined the L.A. Galaxy Academy Youth Staff.

In December 2015, Erush served as the soccer Head Coach for the Maccabiah Pan Am games in Santiago, Chile. He served as Head Coach for soccer for Team USA for the 2017 Maccabiah Games in Israel.

Since 2018 Erush has been the head coach of the Cal State Los Angeles Golden Eagles men's team at California State University-Los Angeles. The coaching staff that he was part of was named the 2021 Coaching Staff of the Year by the United Soccer Coaches.
