= Emanuel Bentil =

Ghanaian footballer (born 1978)

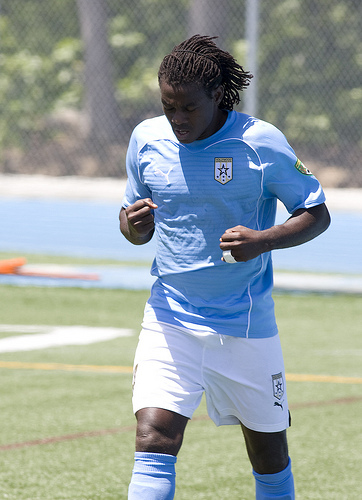

Personal information
- Date of birth: December 3, 1978 (age 47)
- Place of birth: Tema, Ghana
- Height: 1.75 m (5 ft 9 in)
- Position: Midfielder

Youth career
- 1995–1997: Bayern Munich

Senior career*
| Years | Team | Apps | (Gls) |
| 1994–1995 | Okwawu United | | |
| 1997–1998 | Bayern Munich | 0 | (0) |
| 1997–2000 | Bayern Munich (A) | 40 | (9) |
| 2000–2003 | Kalamata | 6 | (0) |
| 2003 | Alania Vladikavkaz | 0 | (0) |
| 2003–2004 | Cherno More | 4 | (0) |
| 2006–2007 | Isidro Metapán | 33 | (1) |
| 2007 | Khatoco Khánh Hoà | 16 | (7) |
| 2008–2009 | Hapoel Nazareth Illit | 8 | (0) |
| 2010–2012 | Hollywood United Hitmen | 12 | (2) |

International career
| 1995 | Ghana U17 | 6 | (2) |
- * Club domestic league appearances and goals

Emanuel Bentil (born December 3, 1978) is a Ghanaian former professional footballer who played as a midfielder.

== Club career ==
Bentil was born in Tema. He began his playing career with Okwawu United, making his debut for the team aged 16, before scouts spotted him as he captained Ghana U-17 to victory at the 1995 FIFA U-17 World Championship, scoring the decisive goal against Brazil in the final. He subsequently signed for famed German side Bayern Munich, but never made a first team appearance for the side in his three years there, playing instead for the reserve team, before being released in 2000.

Bentil spent the next few years bouncing around in Europe, playing for Kalamata in Greece, Alania Vladikavkaz in Russia, and Cherno More in Bulgaria, before heading to North America in 2006. He played with Los Angeles Galaxy's reserve team, before signing for Isidro Metapán in the Primera División de Fútbol de El Salvador, playing 33 matches before leaving at the end of the 2007 season.

Bentil tackled his fourth continent in 2007 when he signed for Vietnamese side Khatoco Khánh Hoà. He moved again in 2008 to play for Hapoel Nazareth Illit in Israel, and played the entire 2008–09 season for the team, before again leaving at the end of the year.

He returned to North America in 2010 and having been unable to secure a professional contract elsewhere, signed with the Hollywood United Hitmen of the USL Premier Development League for the 2010 PDL season. He scored a goal on his Hitmen debut on May 22, 2010, in a 3–3 tie with Fresno Fuego.

== International career ==
Bentil was a member of various Ghanaian youth teams as a teenager. Playing alongside current senior international Stephen Appiah he captained the Ghana team that won the 1995 FIFA U-17 World Championship, scoring what turned out to be the winning goal in the 3–2 victory over Brazil in the final.
