= Daniel Pearl Magnet High School =

School in Los Angeles, California, US

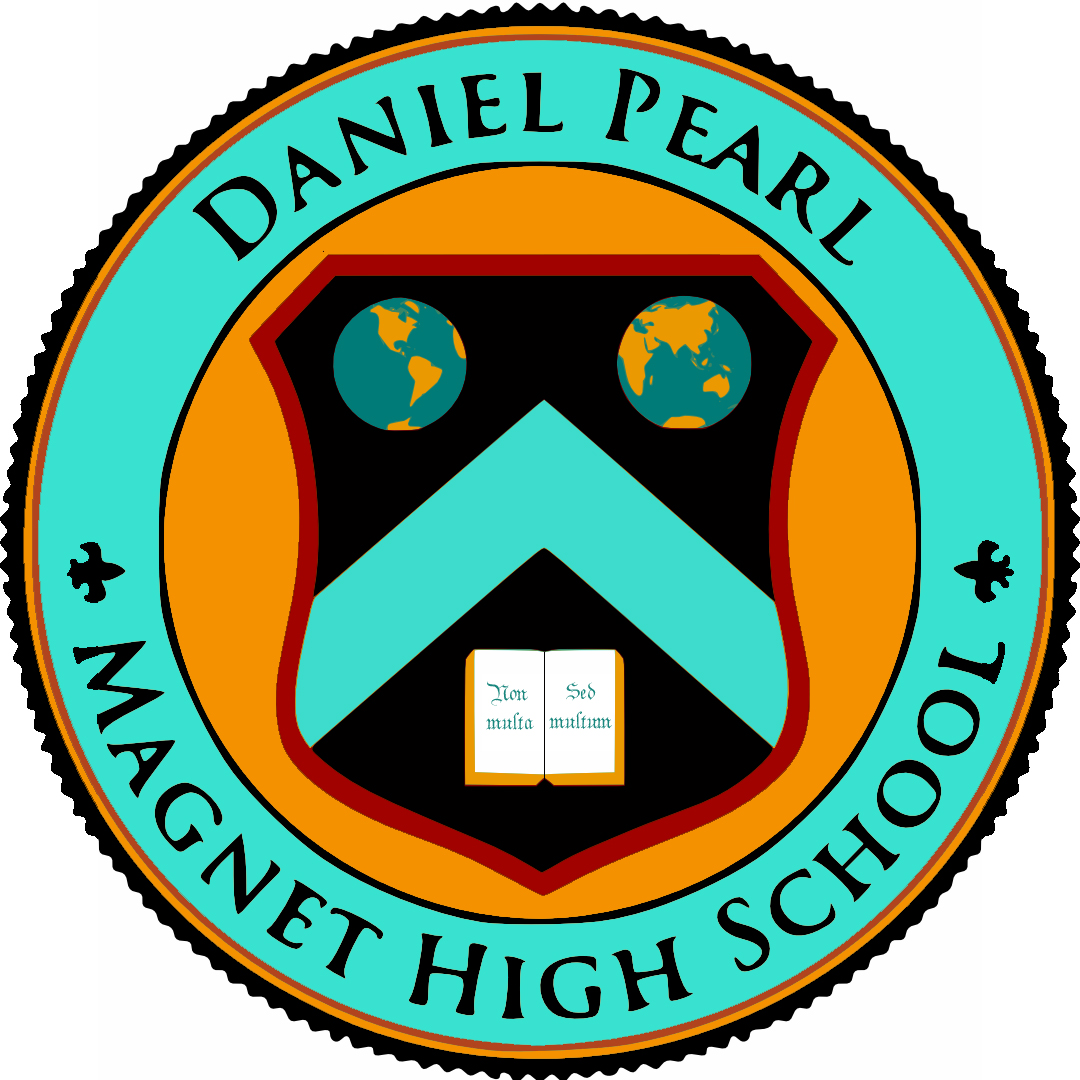

Location
- 6649 Balboa Blvd; Lake Balboa, Los Angeles, California 91406; 34.190972°N 118.501578°W

Information
- Type: Public Magnet School
- Motto: Non multa sed multum (Not many but mighty)
- Established: 2009
- School district: Los Angeles Unified School District
- Principal: Armen Petrossian
- Staff: 9
- Faculty: 15.42 (FTE)
- Grades: 9-12
- Student to teacher ratio: 14.53
- Colors: Turquoise & Black
- Mascot: Shark
- Magnet Coordinator: James Morrison
- Website: Official website

Daniel Pearl Magnet High School (DPMHS) is a magnet school within the Los Angeles Unified School District in Lake Balboa, Los Angeles, near Van Nuys, in the San Fernando Valley.

It is the smallest comprehensive high school in LAUSD. The high school offers a complete academic program with an emphasis on journalism and communications.

== History ==
The school started as a part of Birmingham High School in 1995. In May 2007, the Magnet was renamed. Its current name honors Daniel Pearl, a Wall Street Journal reporter killed by terrorists who was an alumnus of Birmingham High School.

Prior to Pearl Magnet's separation from Birmingham, Birmingham became an independent charter school within LAUSD. About 66% of the faculty members of the school supported it. Because of the divisions within teachers and other staff members, the faculty and staff of the magnet program received permission from LAUSD to split from Birmingham. In 2009, DPMHS was formed as an independent high school on the Birmingham campus. Connie Llanos of the Los Angeles Daily News said that Pearl "got off to a rocky start." During the first year as a standalone school, one third of the students left. Some left due to conflicts with Birmingham staff and students; some Birmingham students and staff members tormented Pearl students. Some left because Pearl was so small; they wanted a more comprehensive high school experience.

DPMHS showed academic prowess as a standalone school. In the Spring 2011 semester, 94% of the tenth grade students passed the California High School Exit Exam (CAHSEE) on the first attempt. It is one of the highest passing rates of the rates of the high schools within the district. As of 2011 the school has an 80% graduation rate, while the average LAUSD graduation rate is 56%. In addition, 72% of the Pearl classes meet university entrance requirements.

In 2010 Pearl moved into a former special education center adjacent to Birmingham. Its current location is made up of the last buildings remaining from Birmingham General Hospital. The site had previously been occupied by West Valley Special Education School since 1980. During that year the school had 313 students, while it had a capacity of 500. Pearl is among the smallest high schools in the LAUSD. Most classes had 30 or less students, and some classes had 12 students each. Many LAUSD high schools have classes of 40 students.

== Academics ==
DPMHS offers a complete college preparation program, with 72% of the courses offered meeting entrance requirements of the University of California.

The school had a 94% pass rate for the 2011 CAHSEE, the third highest in LAUSD. In addition, it had an API Score of 823 for the 2011–2012 academic year.

At the June, 2010 graduation, 65 of 68 seniors graduated, which gave the school a 95.5% pass rate, compared to 53% for LAUSD. For the June, 2016 graduation, 93 of 94 seniors graduated, which is a 98.9% pass rate.

In May, 2016, U.S. News & World Report ranked DPMHS in the top 4.3% (845 out of 19,908) of public high schools in the United States, and awarded the school a Silver Medal ranking. The School was also ranked in the same study as #120 in the nationwide ranking of Magnet Schools. These scores indicate that DPMHS is considered to be the top performing public non-charter High School in the San Fernando Valley.

== Publications ==
The Pearl Post is the student newspaper published at DPMHS.

On June 26, 2016, the Los Angeles Press Club recognized The Pearl Post as High School Newspaper of the Year, stating that "The Pearl Post combines an exciting range of articles, photos, and opinion pieces in a well-organized layout, making it easier and quicker to find sections of interest and, thus, keeping its readers coming back for more."

== Censorship ==
In November 2021, students wrote an article about the district's COVID protocols, and named a librarian who refused to comply with the district's vaccine mandate, resulting in the closure of the school's library. The librarian complained to the principal, alleging that the story violated HIPAA. The principal ordered Adriana Chavira, student newspaper advisor, to censor the student paper by removing the librarian's name. She refused, with the support of the Student Press Law Center and the family of Daniel Pearl. In September 2022, the principal suspended the teacher without pay, but in an appeal hearing on September 16, the district rescinded the suspension.

== Houses ==
In the Spring 2011 semester, Houses were introduced as a part of the school culture. The houses are named after famous journalists. Members of the Houses are awarded House Points for academic, athletic, or service achievements; points are deducted for infractions such as tardiness, missing homework, or violation of class or school rules. All of the Houses compete for the House Cup, which is awarded at an annual Banquet at the end of the school year. As of August 2019, the system of Houses has been abolished, as its overseer and founder Intal has retired from teaching.

Houses at Daniel Pearl Magnet High School
Name	Namesake	Colors	Symbol
Clemens House	Samuel Clemens	black and gold	Ship's Wheel
Hersey House	John Hersey	red and gold	Sunburst
Higgins House	Marguerite Higgins	blue and silver	Griffin
Salazar House	Rubén Salazar	green and silver	Castle Tower

=== House of the Year ===
Year	House
2010–2011	Salazar House
2011–2012	Clemens House
2012–2013	Hersey House
2013–2014	Salazar House
2014–2015	Hersey House
2015–2016	Higgins House
2016–2017	Clemens House

== See also ==
- High Tech Los Angeles
- Birmingham High School
