= Carlos Carrillo (footballer) =

Salvadoran footballer (born 1984)

Personal information
- Full name: Carlos Josué Carrillo Chopin
- Date of birth: October 12, 1984 (age 42)
- Place of birth: San Salvador, El Salvador
- Height: 1.75 m (5 ft 9 in)
- Position: Defender

Youth career
- 2001–2003: Alianza FC (reserves)

Senior career*
| Years | Team | Apps | (Gls) |
| 2003 | Platense | | |
| 2004–2006 | Alianza FC | | |
| 2006–2008 | Isidro Metapán | | |
| 2008–2010 | Municipal Limeño | | |
| 2009 | Nejapa FC | | |
| 2011 | Hollywood United Hitmen | | |
| 2011–2016 | CD FAS | | |
| 2016–2017 | CD Chalatenango | 39 | (2) |
| 2017–2018 | Sonsonate FC | 38 | (0) |
| 2018–2019 | CD Audaz | 21 | (0) |
| 2019–2020 | Independiente FC | | |

International career
- El Salvador
- * Club domestic league appearances and goals

Carlos Josué Carrillo Chopin (born October 12, 1984) is a Salvadoran professional footballer, who plays as a defender.

== Club career ==
=== Alianza ===
Born in San Salvador, Carrillo began his career in the reserve team of Alianza, before joining Segunda División club, Platense, in 2003.

=== Isidro Metapán ===
Carrillo went on to play with several clubs in the Primera División; these included Isidro Metapán and Municipal Limeño.

=== Hollywood United Hitmen ===
He signed with Hollywood United Hitmen of the USL Premier Development League in mid 2011.

=== FAS ===
Carrillo signed with FAS in August 2011. With FAS, Carrillo reached the Clausura 2013 final, but they were defeated 3–0 by Luis Ángel Firpo.

In the Apertura 2013, they reached the final again, but they were defeated 1–0 by Isidro Metapán.

FAS reached a new final in the Apertura 2015. Carrillo could not dispute that final because of an injury. FAS was defeated 1–0 by Alianza.

=== Chalatenango ===
Carrillo signed with Chalatenango for the Apertura 2016 tournament. With Chalatenango, Carrillo experienced a serious institutional, economic and sports crisis. The most serious episode of this crisis occurred in 2017, when the club's directive did not make the federal registration in the FESFUT.

=== Sonsonate ===
Carrillo signed with Sonsonate for the Apertura 2017 tournament. Carrillo continued with the club for the Clausura 2018. However, with Sonsonate he experienced an administrative, economic and sports crisis in that tournament. Sonsonate played an extra game against Dragón in the Estadio Cuscatlán to define the team descended. Sonsonate won 3–2.

=== Audaz ===
Carrillo signed with Audaz for the Apertura 2018 tournament. With Audaz, Carrillo reached the quarter-finals of that tournament, but he suffered an injury in the second leg of the quarter-finals, a 2–1 defeat against Águila in the Estadio Juan Francisco Barraza.
