= José Miranda (footballer) =

Cuban footballer (born 1986)

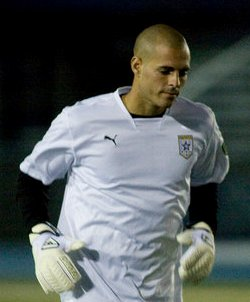

Personal information
- Full name: José Manuel Miranda Boudy
- Date of birth: August 22, 1986 (age 40)
- Place of birth: Varadero, Cuba
- Height: 6 ft 2 in (1.88 m)
- Position: Goalkeeper

Senior career*
Years	Team	Apps	(Gls)
2005–2007	Matanzas		
2008	Sevilla FC Puerto Rico		
2009	Hollywood United Hitmen	15	(0)
2009	Sevilla FC Puerto Rico		
2010	Hollywood United Hitmen	15	(0)
2011	Puerto Rico United	4	(0)
2011–2012	Barnechea FC	1	(0)
2012	Los Angeles Blues	10	(0)
2014	Los Angeles Misioneros	6	(0)
2014–2015	Orange County Blues	27	(0)
2016	San Nicolás		
2017	Moreno Valley		
2017–2018	Golden State Force	8	(0)

International career^{‡}
2008	Cuba	2	(0)
- * Club domestic league appearances and goals as of August 10, 2012 ‡ National team caps and goals as of May 17, 2009

José Manuel Miranda Boudy (born August 22, 1986, in Varadero, Matanzas Province) is a Cuban footballer who last played for Golden State Force in the Premier Development League.

== Career ==
=== Club ===
Miranda began his career in his native Cuba, playing for his local side, Matanzas.

Following his defection to the United States, Miranda signed on with Puerto Rican team Sevilla FC Puerto Rico, before eventually finding his way to southern California. He played for Los Angeles-based amateur team, before signing with the expansion Hollywood United Hitmen in the USL Premier Development League for the 2009 PDL season.

=== International ===
He made his senior international debut for Cuba in a February 2008 friendly match against Guyana and has earned a total of 2 caps, scoring no goals.

Miranda was called up to the Cuba national football team to compete in the qualifying tournament for the 2008 Summer Olympics. He started in the games against Trinidad and Tobago and Grenada, but following Cuba's game against the United States in Tampa, Florida, on March 11, 2008, Miranda defected under the US's wet foot dry foot policy along with six of his teammates.
