= Birmingham High School =

High school in the San Fernando Valley

Birmingham Community Charter High School
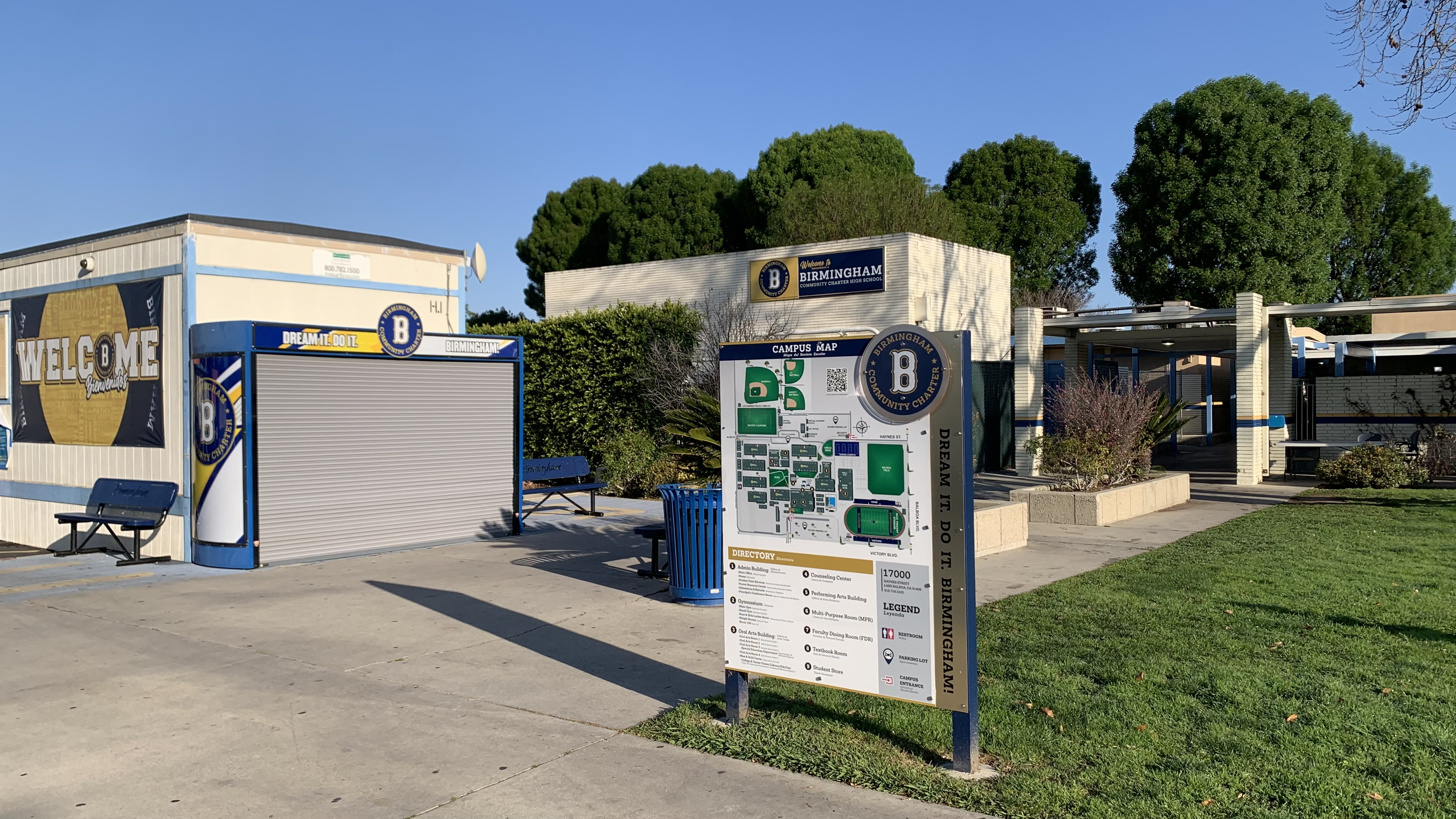

Location
- 17000 Haynes Street Lake Balboa; Los Angeles, California 91406; United States; 34°11′18″N 118°30′18″W

Information
- Type: Charter College-preparatory
- Established: 1953; 73 years ago
- Locale: City, Large
- School district: Los Angeles Unified School District (internal charter)
- NCES District ID: 0601596
- NCES School ID: 060159602857
- Principal: Ari Bennett
- Teaching staff: 139.87 (on an FTE basis)
- Grades: 9–12
- Enrollment: 3,162 (2024–25)
  - Male: 1,613
  - Female: 1,546
- Student to teacher ratio: 22.61
- Colors: Blue and gold
- Athletics conference: CIF Los Angeles City Section
- Nickname: Patriots
- Website: www.bcchs.net

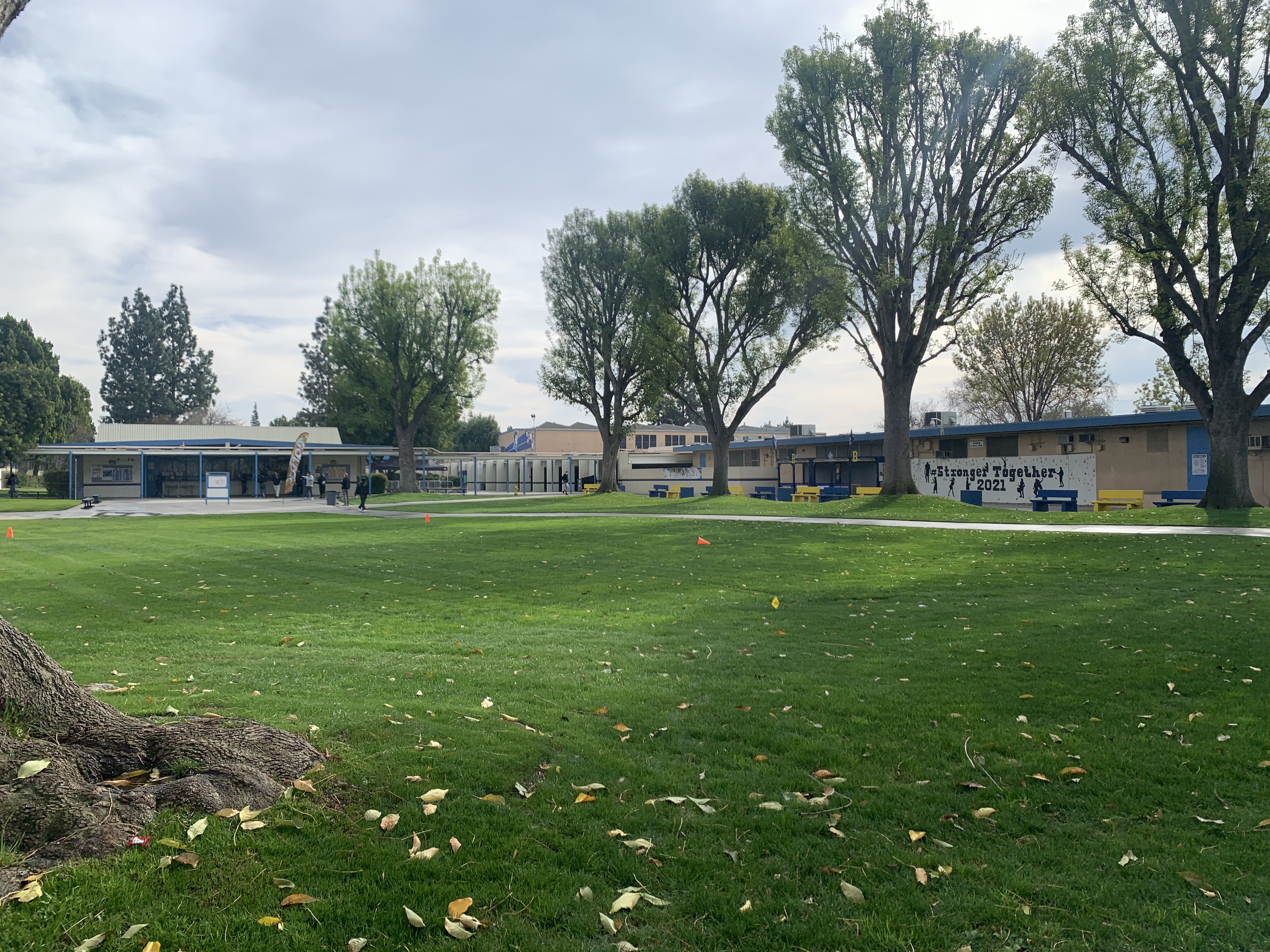
View of the Birmingham High School Quad

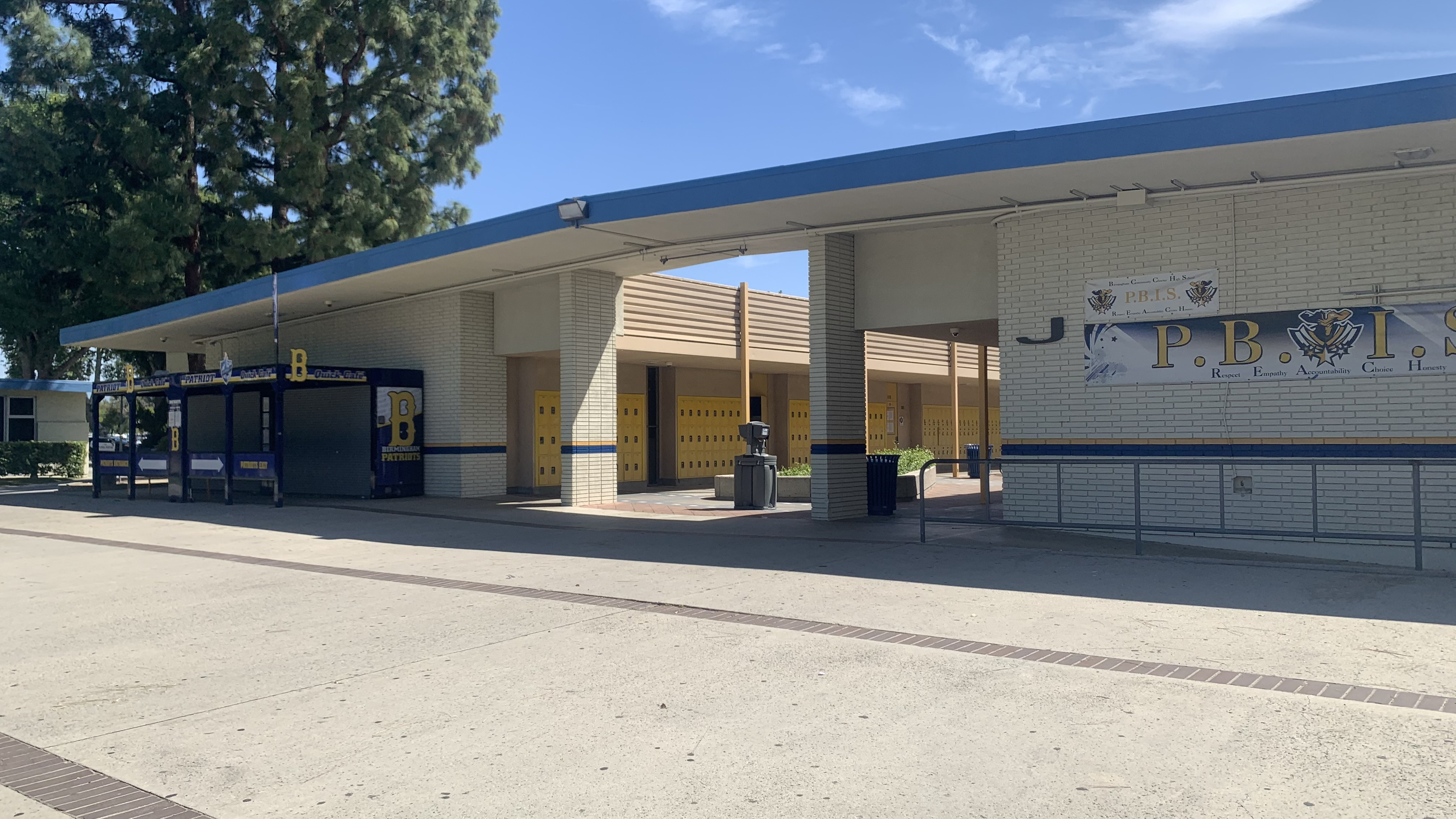
View of J Hall, one of the eight halls in the school

Birmingham Community Charter High School (formerly Birmingham High School) is a charter high school in the neighborhood/district of Lake Balboa in the San Fernando Valley section of Los Angeles, California, United States. It was founded in 1953 as a 7–12 grade combined high school and became solely a senior high school in 1963. The school has a Van Nuys address and serves Lake Balboa, parts of Encino, and Amestoy Estates. It is within the Los Angeles Unified School District but operates as an internal charter school.

== History ==
The land of Birmingham High School was a US Army hospital called Birmingham General Hospital from August 24, 1943, until March 31, 1946. From 1946 to 1950 the hospital was named the Birmingham Veterans Administration Hospital when it was turned over to the Veterans Administration. In 1952, the hospital was sold to the Los Angeles City Schools for $1.00. The hospital was named after Brigadier General Henry Patrick Birmingham (1854–1932), with the World War I US Army Medical Corps. The school opened in 1953, during the immediate post-World War II era. Originally it served children grades seven to 12 from families newly settled in the San Fernando Valley. As of the 1960s the families were middle-class, and many of them had settled in the San Fernando Valley from the East Coast and the Midwest.

It was in the Los Angeles City High School District until 1961, when it merged into LAUSD.

On November 13, 1992, a 17-year-old student was stabbed twice in the back from a gang-related fight. He was immediately treated and sent to Northridge Hospital Medical Center for non-life-threatening wounds.

By 2006, the student demographics became majority Latino and Hispanic. The same year, Marsha Coates, the principal, established "small learning communities" and a ninth-grade academy in order to cater to incoming students.

=== Charter designation ===
On July 1, 2009, the Los Angeles Unified School District (LAUSD) voted to allow the high school to become a charter school under the name Birmingham Community Charter High School. Prior to the approval, the school officials had fought over whether the school should become a charter for months. Some school officials had advocated creating an alternate school sponsored by the teachers' union on the same campus. About 66% of the faculty members of the school supported the charter change. After the charter was approved, 91 teachers continued to teach at Birmingham while 34 decided to leave to work at other LAUSD schools. This meant the Spanish, science, and history departments had a high level of turnover.

Because of the divisions within teachers and other staff members, the faculty and staff of the magnet program received permission from LAUSD to split from Birmingham. In 2009, Daniel Pearl Magnet High School was formed as an independent high school within the Birmingham campus. Connie Llanos of the Los Angeles Daily News said that Pearl "got off to a rocky start." During the first year as a standalone school, one third of the students left. Some left due to conflicts with Birmingham staff and students; some Birmingham students and staff members tormented Pearl students. Some left because Pearl was so small; they wanted a more comprehensive high school experience. Pearl moved into its own facility next to Birmingham in 2010.

In 2012, LAUSD officials accused the school of failing to adequately respond to allegations of racial discrimination and mishandling disabled student services and expulsion, and the LAUSD officials attempted to return Birmingham to direct district control. Birmingham officials stated that they were unaware of serious problems at their school.

== Campus ==
The school is located in the Lake Balboa area, which was previously a part of Van Nuys. The site was previously a military hospital.

As of 2009, Birmingham has the largest high school campus in the LAUSD, at 53 acres. The campus is in proximity to Reseda.

== Attendance boundary ==
Its attendance boundary includes Lake Balboa, and portions of Van Nuys, Encino, Tarzana, and Reseda. The boundary also includes Amestoy Estates.

== Academics ==
In 2006 Mitchell Landsberg of the Los Angeles Times wrote that "It would be easy to see Birmingham as just another bad public school. But for many students, it's not." He cited the Daniel Pearl Journalism Magnet, the "dedicated core of teachers" and the "variety of honors and Advanced Placement classes." Landsberg stated that despite the demographic changes that came before 2006, "academic standards have not suffered; if anything, a Birmingham diploma today is more difficult to obtain than it was a generation ago."

== Demographics ==
In 2009 the school had 2,700 students. That year, Mitchell Landsberg of the Los Angeles Times wrote that "Birmingham is in some ways the quintessential Los Angeles school, with demographics and student performance that come close to mirroring the city as a whole."

In September 2001 there were 1,100 9th graders entering Birmingham High School; this class would become the Class of 2005. Over 350 of the students in this class, over the course of the years, switched to other schools to study. About half of the switching students remained at traditional high schools and the other half went to independent study, vocational school, or other alternative educational settings. In June 2005 there were 521 graduating students of the Class of 2005, fewer than half of the starting number. Media attention to this rate of graduation resulted in a nighttime meeting with parents.

In a period prior to 2006 students zoned to overcrowded high schools were bused to Birmingham. 102 students who were zoned to Belmont High School were instead a part of the Birmingham Class of 2005.

As of 2006 there were almost 4,000 students attending the school. Landsberg wrote that there had been ethnic conflicts between Latino and African-American students and between Latino and Armenian students the same year.

From 2016 to 2017, about 3,145 students enrolled at Birmingham High School, making it a large school. Birmingham is ranked one of the top 10 largest schools in California. The school offers their students college course classes known as AP courses to prepare students for college. These courses include: Art History, Calculus AB, Calculus BC, Chemistry, Environmental Science, Human Geography, Psychology, United States Government and Politics, English Language and Composition, European History, Human Geography, Spanish Literature and Culture, Statistics, Studio Art: 2-D Design, Studio Art: Drawing, and United States History.

== Academic performance ==
In 2006 Mitchell Landsberg of the Los Angeles Times wrote that "Many students thrived at Birmingham", but "many others struggled, or gave up and quit." As of that year, he stated that the school "sent its share of students to good colleges -- Cal State and UC campuses, even the Ivy League." In the Class of 2005, about 75% had intentions to partake in higher education. Over 60 students from that class went to the University of California campuses.

In 2006 the LAUSD gave the official four-year graduation rate of Birmingham High as being almost 80%, with an official dropout rate of 3.5%. A Civil Rights Project at Harvard University/University of California, Los Angeles published a report in the northern hemisphere Spring of 2005 that stated that the four year graduation rate at Birmingham was 50%.

In 2009, 9% of students were rated as proficient or higher in mathematics and 34% were rated as proficient or higher in English. In 2008 9% received this rating in mathematics and 36% received this rating in English.

== In popular culture ==
Birmingham High School has been used as the backdrop for numerous music videos, commercials, and television shows, such as the music video for Simple Plan's song "Can't Keep My Hands off You", Missy Elliott's song "Gossip Folks", Gwen Stefani's song "Hollaback Girl", Corbin Bleu's song "Push It to the Limit," Eminem's "No Love", Lil Wayne's "Prom Queen", and Charli XCX's "Break the Rules". In 2007 an episode of America's Next Top Model was filmed there, also two more episodes were filmed there, one in 2008, and later in 2013. Other shows filmed at Birmingham High School include Nip/Tuck, NCIS, Cold Case, Scrubs, The Office, Ghost Whisperer and Monk. The movie “The Boy Next Door” with Jennifer Lopez

The school's football field was used as a set for the shoot of the music video for Angels & Airwaves' song "Everything's Magic". The track surrounding the football field served as the location for the relay race scene starring Kirk Cameron in Like Father Like Son. An episode of Full House was filmed there, with Danny, Jesse, and Joey running a race around the track. In addition, Fanny Pak of America's Best Dance Crew comes to the dance studio to practice before they go on tour.

In June 2009 Los Angeles Schools superintendent Ramon C. Cortines objected to photographs of the school's football team posing with comedian Sacha Baron Cohen in his guise as Brüno that appeared in GQ magazine. Although Cortines gave discipline against principal Marcia Coates and athletic director Rick Prizant, Cortines stated that the discipline could not be enforced, because, since Birmingham was becoming a charter school, Coates and Prizant would no longer be LAUSD employees.

== Sports ==
The school's athletic nickname is the Patriots. Originally the nickname was the Braves. Native Americans in the San Fernando Valley had campaigned against the use of the "Braves" mascot at Birmingham High, as part of a national movement to remove Native American mascots. The LAUSD school board voted to remove Native American mascots and logos from all schools.

The school was told that it needed to change its mascot by June 28, 1998. The students voted for the new mascot to be the "Blue Devil". Gerald Kleinman, the principal at the time, stated that the school's mascot committee believed the "Blue Devil" was an inappropriate choice and overruled the students, instead choosing the "Patriot".

=== Soccer ===
- In soccer, alumni Michael Erush was honored as the 1999 Los Angeles Times and Los Angeles Daily News All-Region Player of the Year, and was a 2000 NSCAA High School All-America selection. He was three-time All-Northwest Conference, and two-time All-Valley and All-West Valley League, as well as All-America honorable mention as a senior. He was inducted into the Birmingham Community Charter Athletic Hall of Fame.

=== Lacrosse ===
- During the 2008–09 school year, Birmingham introduced a lacrosse team.

== Notable alumni ==
- Govind Armstrong, chef
- Larry Bell, artist
- Lisa Bonet, actress
- Damon Buford, Major League Baseball player
- Mick Burrs, poet
- Marc Cohen, ABC radio talk show host
- Tim Conway Jr., radio personality, The Tim Conway Jr. Show
- Ronnie Eckstine, actor
- Michael Erush, soccer player and coach
- Jordan Farmar, basketball player
- Raymond E. Feist, novelist
- Sally Field, actress; played Gidget in 1965
- Jo Freeman, feminist and political scientist
- Mossimo Giannulli, clothing designer
- Terry Gilliam, director, actor, Monty Python
- Jay Golden, academic, sustainability leader
- David Gregory, journalist
- Bill Handel, radio personality, KFI 640 AM
- Jermaine Jackson, singer, songwriter
- Malik Jackson, NFL player
- Marquis Jackson, NFL player
- Jeremy Licht, actor
- Linda Lingle, governor of Hawaii
- Michael Milken, financier, philanthropist
- Tamera Mowry, actress
- Tia Mowry, actress
- Robert Newman, actor, Guiding Light
- Michael Ovitz, talent agent
- Daniel Pearl, journalist, murdered by Islamist militants
- Ken Poulsen, baseball player, member of "Impossible Dream" 1967 Boston Red Sox American League championship team
- Michael Richards, actor
- Sally Ride, physicist and former NASA astronaut
- Mychal Rivera, NFL player
- Paul Rodriguez Jr., professional skateboarder
- Daniel Rotman, entrepreneur
- David S. Rubin, curator, art critic, artist
- Peter Schlesinger, artist
- Bobby Sherman, actor
- Mickey Sholdar, actor
- Judee Sill, singer, actor
- Pamela Skaist-Levy, clothing designer, founder of Juicy Couture
- Leland Sklar, bassist
- Chris Taylor, Wisconsin State Assembly member and Wisconsin Circuit Court judge
- Karrueche Tran, model and actress
- Karen Valentine, actress, Room 222
- Barry Van Dyke, actor
- Billy Warlock, actor
- Cindy Williams, actress
- Jeron Wilson, professional skateboarder
- Hasan Zaidi, Harvard neurosurgeon

== Notable faculty ==
- Hy Cohen (1931–2021), Major League Baseball player
