= Israel Sesay =

American soccer player (born 1990)

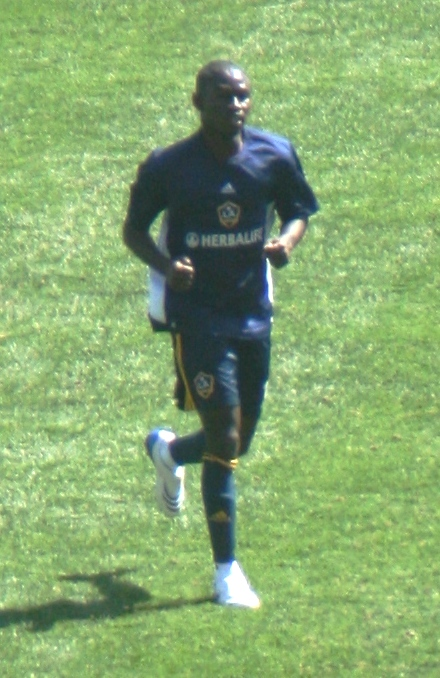

Personal information
- Full name: Israel Sesay
- Date of birth: September 4, 1990 (age 36)
- Place of birth: Kenema, Sierra Leone
- Height: 5 ft 6 in (1.68 m)
- Positions: Defender; forward

Team information
- Current team: Empire Strykers
- Number: 23

Youth career
- 2004–2005: Bethesda Arsenal
- 2005–2006: Potomac Cougars
- 2006–2008: IMG Soccer Academy

Senior career*
Years	Team	Apps	(Gls)
2007–2010	Los Angeles Galaxy	30	(8)
2009	→ Hollywood United Hitmen (loan)	4	(3)
2009	→ Cleveland City Stars (loan)	12	(0)
2010	Real Maryland	18	(7)
2011–2012	Los Angeles Blues	43	(20)
2012–2013	Milwaukee Wave (indoor)	24	(5)
2013–2014	Ontario Fury (indoor)	7	(5)
2014	Las Vegas Legends (indoor)	8	(7)
2014–	Empire Strykers (indoor)	189	(56)

International career^{‡}
2006–2008	United States U17	14	(0)
	United States U20	7	
- United States arena soccer
- * Club domestic league appearances and goals as of November 27, 2024 ‡ National team caps and goals as of May 15, 2009

Israel Sesay (born September 4, 1990) is a soccer player who currently plays as a defender for the Empire Strykers in the Major Arena Soccer League. Born in Sierra Leone, he has represented the United States at youth level.

== Career ==
=== Early life and amateur ===
Sesay immigrated from his native Sierra Leone with his family at the age of 11, settling in Gaithersburg, Maryland. He attended Quince Orchard High School, where he starred as a forward and helped lead his school to the Regional Quarterfinals in 2005. He also played for local club team Potomac Cougars.

=== Professional ===
Sesay came to Los Angeles Galaxy as part of a weighted lottery in August 2007, and made his MLS debut on September 13, 2007, coming on as a substitute for Kyle Martino against Chivas USA; in doing so, Sesay became the youngest player in Los Angeles history to appear in a game, at the age of 17 years and 9 days, breaking the former record held by Guillermo Gonzalez, who was 17 years and 168 days when he made his debut in June 2003.

With the MLS Reserve Division having been scrapped at the end of 2008, Los Angeles loaned Sesay to the Hollywood United Hitmen of the USL Premier Development League and the Cleveland City Stars of the USL First Division for part of the 2009 season, to maintain his match fitness levels. He scored two goals on his Hollywood debut on May 16, 2009, against Bakersfield Brigade.

Sesay signed with the Real Maryland Monarchs of the USL Second Division on April 26, 2010. However, Sesay was still considered to be a part of Los Angeles per the MLS Players Union Player Salaries as of June 14, 2010.

Sesay signed with the Los Angeles Blues of the USL Pro in January 2011. He re-signed with LA for the 2012 season on October 7, 2011.

In October 2013, Sesay signed with the Ontario Fury (now the Empire Strykers) of the Professional Arena Soccer League. In January 2014, he was traded to the Las Vegas Legends. The following season he transferred back to the Ontario Fury.

=== International ===
Sesay played in 14 games with the U.S. national Under-17 team between 2006 and 2008, making ten starts and collecting three assists.
