= Willie Sims (footballer) =

Guatemalan soccer player

Personal information
- Full name: Jefferson Willie Sims
- Date of birth: 18 January 1984 (age 42)
- Place of birth: Guatemala City, Guatemala
- Height: 5 ft 9 in (1.75 m)
- Position: Forward

College career
Years	Team	Apps	(Gls)
2002–2005	Cal State Northridge Matadors		

Senior career*
Years	Team	Apps	(Gls)
2006–2007	New England Revolution	9	(0)
2007	→ Puerto Rico Islanders (loan)	10	(3)
2008	San Fernando Valley Quakes	1	(0)
2008	Miami FC	10	(0)
2008	Suchitepéquez	5	(0)
2009–2010	Hollywood United Hitmen	12	(6)
2010	Ventura County Fusion	2	(0)
2012–2014	Los Angeles Misioneros	1	(0)

International career^{‡}
2007	Guatemala	1	(0)
- * Club domestic league appearances and goals as of April 22, 2012 ‡ National team caps and goals as of June 30, 2009

Jefferson Willie Sims (born 18 January 1984) is a Guatemalan former professional footballer who played as a forward.

== Early life ==
Sims grew up in the San Fernando Valley area of Los Angeles, California, attended Reseda High School, and then played college soccer at California State University, Northridge from 2003 to 2005, redshirting in 2002. Sims was named the Big West Conference Co-Offensive Player of the Year in the 2003 and 2004 seasons, and NSCAA First-Team All-American in the 2005 season. CSUN made the NCAA Men's Soccer Championship tournament all three seasons that Sims was on the team.

== Club career ==
Sims was drafted in the second round (23rd overall) of the 2006 MLS SuperDraft by New England Revolution. He saw little time in his rookie season, but showed much potential for the Revolution, and was praised by Revolution head coach Steve Nicol. Sims led the Revolution's reserve squad in the 2006 season with 3 goals in ten games (the entire team only scored 9). His best performance for New England came in a pre-season exhibition match against Bermuda U-21 team, in which he scored 3 goals. He also had an assist in a mid-season exhibition against Scottish giants Celtic.

During his second year, Sims only saw regular time for the reserves, so the New England management decided to loan out Sims to the USL First Division side Puerto Rico Islanders to gain more experience and minutes. Sims made ten appearances for the Islanders, and became the first Islanders player ever to score a hattrick (against Miami FC on August 19).

Sims returned to New England for the final few months of the season, but was waived at the end of 2007. He subsequently signed for PDL side San Fernando Valley Quakes, where his brother Oscar has also played, and played one game for them against Ventura County Fusion, before signing with Miami FC of the USL First Division in June 2008.

Sims spent the rest of the 2008 USL season with Miami FC in the USL First Division, playing nine games during the final couple of months of the year, before and then travelled home to Guatemala when he signed with Suchitepéquez of the Liga Nacional de Fútbol de Guatemala in October 2008.

Sims was released by Suchitepéquez in early 2009 and, having been unable to secure a professional contract elsewhere, signed for Hollywood United Hitmen in the USL Premier Development League in June. He made his debut, and scored his first goal for the team, on June 4, 2009, in a 3-2 loss to Ventura County Fusion. After starting the 2010 PDL season with the Hitmen he was released during the campaign, and switched to their league rivals Ventura County Fusion.

After spending a year out of the game in 2011, Sims signed to play for the Los Angeles Misioneros in the USL Premier Development League in 2012.

== International career ==
Sims's name was often discussed as a potential player for the Guatemalan National Team. Sims was born in Guatemala, and his father Oscar played for the national team and in the Guatemalan League.

Before the 2006 MLS SuperDraft, Sims said he had no interest in playing for La Azul y Blanco, and that he was even considering becoming an American citizen, in hopes of one day playing for the U.S. National Team.

By November 2006, Sims had changed his position, telling La Opinión that he would be interested in playing for Guatemala in the UNCAF Nations Cup 2007, and nearly joining the squad for a friendly against Venezuela on November 15.

Sims finally made his debut for the Guatemalan national team on 17 November 2007 in a game against Honduras, coming off the bench in the 85th minute. It was his first appearance at any national level, having been ignored by Guatemala at youth level in spite of his college performances. He would have also been in the Guatemalan Olympic team, but missed out because of the U23 rule that applies for that competition. As of January 2010, he did not add any caps to his tally.
