= Hollywood United Hitmen =

- Full name: Hollywood United FC Hitmen
- Nickname: The Hitmen
- Founded: 2009
- Ground: Crenshaw High School; Crenshaw, California
- Capacity: 4,000
- Owners: (Australia) Anthony LaPaglia (United States) Donal Logue (Canada) Jason Mathot
- Head Coach: (United States) Jose Botello
- 2010 (PDL): 2nd, Southwest; Playoffs: Conference Semifinals
Home colors	Away colors

Hollywood United Hitmen was an American soccer team based in Los Angeles. The team was founded in 2009 and played in the National Premier Soccer League (NPSL) and the USL Premier Development League (PDL).

The team played its home games in Cougar Stadium at Crenshaw High School, where they played since 2011. The team's colors are black, gold and white.

== History ==
Hollywood United Hitmen was formed as a result of a collaboration between the 2008 USL W-League champions Pali Blues and the Hollywood United organization, who acquired the franchise right from the San Fernando Valley Quakes in 2009.

Hollywood United is an internationally famous Los Angeles-based amateur team which has, for many years, competed in local amateur leagues. Over the years, celebrity players such as actors Anthony LaPaglia, Dermot Mulroney, Brandon Routh, Gilles Marini, Ralf Little, Donal Logue, and Jimmy Jean-Louis, musicians Steve Jones, Robbie Williams, Christian Olde Wolbers and Ziggy Marley, film director Danny Cannon, MLS veteran Paul Bravo, and former international soccer players Vinnie Jones, Eric Wynalda, John Harkes, Alexi Lalas, Richard Gough and Frank Leboeuf have played for the "senior" Hollywood United team.

The Hitmen played their first official PDL game on May 1, 2009, a 1–0 victory over the Fresno Fuego., with the first goal in franchise history being scored by Armando Ochoa. The first half of the season continued spectacularly for the Hitmen, winning their next four games on the bounce, demolishing Ventura County Fusion and Bakersfield Brigade 4–0 each, and not conceding a goal until their topsy-turvy 4–3 victory over Ogden Outlaws in mid-May. During the early part of the season, Hollywood negotiated a deal with Los Angeles Galaxy whereby some of the MLS team's fringe players would join the Hitmen on loan to keep up their match fitness levels, following the demise of the MLS Reserve Division; Tristan Bowen, Leonard Griffin, Kyle Patterson and Israel Sesay all contributed to the Hollywood cause with several goals and assists during their spells. They suffered their first defeat 1–0 away to BYU Cougars, and endured a rocky spell in June when they went three games without a win, but bounced back to demolish Ogden 7–3 at home thanks to a brace from striker Jaime Chavez. Halfway through the season head coach Michael Erush left the team to take up a coaching position with the US national soccer team competing at the 2009 Maccabiah Games in Israel; his position as head coach was taken over by his assistant, Mat Herold. Despite being involved in an astonishing 0–0 tie with the Los Angeles Legends in early July in which seven players were shown red cards, Hollywood wrapped up the Southwest Division title with a 3–2 come-from-behind victory over the Southern California Seahorses, and secured a bye to the final of the divisional playoffs. Unfortunately, the Hitmen were unexpectedly dropped 3–1 by Ventura County Fusion in extra time, and had to be content with nothing more than the divisional title in their first year in PDL competition. Jaime Chavez was Hollywood's top scorer, with 10 goals, while both Nick Kohlschreiber and Armando Ochoa contributed three assists each.

Hollywood began 2010 with the introduction of a new head coach - former Los Angeles Galaxy forward Jose Botello - and a cache of new internationals including former Bayern Munich midfielder Emanuel Bentil, El Salvador international Edwin Miranda, and Mutala Mohammed, a Ghanaian youth international with CAF Champions League experience. Despite the wealth of talent, Hollywood stuttered through their opening games; a promising 3–0 opening-day victory on the road against Fresno Fuego was followed by a pair of demoralizing losses to the Southern California Seahorses and the Los Angeles Azul Legends, and a 3–3 tie at home against Fresno which saw the Hitmen throw away a 2-goal lead and concede an 88th-minute equalizer. The tide turned following a 3–1 victory over national champions Ventura County Fusion in late May, and from then on Hollywood became a free-scoring goal machine, losing just one of their next 11 games. Mutala Mohammed and Shay Spitz both scored twice in a 6–3 victory over the Lancaster Rattlers, they beat Ventura for a second time with a convincing 3–0 win in June, Jaime Chavez bagged a brace in 6–2 win on the road against the Ogden Outlaws, and Brent Whitfield scored twice on his debut in the 4–1 win in the return fixture against Ogden on the final day of the regular season. Finishing second in the division behind Ventura, Hollywood traveled to Bremerton, Washington for the Western Conference playoffs, where they played Northwest Division champs Portland Timbers U23's. Despite taking an early lead, Hollywood lost 2–1 to the eventual national champions. Jaime Chavez was the top marksman for the Hitmen, with 11 goals and 7 assists.

== Players ==
=== 2011 roster ===
Note: Flags indicate national team as defined under FIFA eligibility rules; some limited exceptions apply. Players may hold more than one non-FIFA nationality.

No.	Pos.	Nation	Player
1	GK	MEX	Raul Calderon
2	DF	MEX	Leo Alvarez
3	DF	GUA	Oscar Sims
4	DF	MEX	Carlos Morales
5	FW	MEX	Jose Miranda
6	DF	USA	Marcus Watson
7	MF	MEX	Emmanuel Rodriguez
8	FW	USA	Brent Whitfield
9	FW	MEX	Esaul Mendoza
10	MF	GHA	Emanuel Bentil
11	DF	MEX	Jose de Anda
11	MF	BOL	Gerardo Espinoza

No.	Pos.	Nation	Player
13	MF	USA	Jorge Becerra
14	DF	ARG	Antonio Meza
15	MF	COL	Nick Blanco
16	FW	USA	Estuardo Sanchez
17	MF	MEX	Rene Corona
18	FW	GUA	Edwin Acevedo
19	MF	CHI	Andy Contreras
20	FW	SLV	Arturo Albarrán
21	FW	HON	Jesus Flores
22	DF	SLV	Carlos Carrillo
23	MF	PAR	Gerardo Martinez
26	MF	NGA	Shalom Bako
32	GK	ARG	Luis Romero

=== Notable former players ===
This list of notable former players comprises players who went on to play professional soccer after playing for the team in the Premier Development League, or those who previously played professionally before joining the team.

- (United States) Tristan Bowen
- (United States) Jaime Chavez
- (Iran) Shahryar Dastan
- (United States) Leonard Griffin
- (El Salvador) Edwin Miranda
- (Cuba) José Miranda
- (Ghana) Mutala Mohammed
- (England) Kyle Patterson
- (United States) Israel Sesay
- (Guatemala) Willie Sims
- (United States) Julian Valentin

=== Staff ===
- (United States) Jose Botello Head Coach
- (Canada) Jason Mathot General Manager
- (Mexico) Humberto Mier Assistant Coach
- (Mexico) Jesse Colon Assistant Coach
- (United States) Kenzo Bergeron Director of Operations
- (England) Jon Broxton Game Day Operations
- (Belgium) Christian Olde Wolbers Game Day Operations
- (United States) Alexandria Lacayo Trainer

== Year-by-year ==
Year	Division	League	Regular season	Playoffs	Open Cup
2009	4	USL PDL	1st, Southwest	Divisional Finals	Did not qualify
2010	4	USL PDL	2nd, Southwest	Conference Semifinals	Did not qualify
2011	4	NPSL	1st, Northwest	Finals	1st Round

== Honors ==
- NPSL Western Conference Champions 2011
- NPSL Northwest Division Champions 2011
- USL PDL Southwest Division Champions 2009

== Head coaches ==
- (United States) Michael Erush (2009)
- (United States) Mat Herold (2009)
- (United States) Jose Botello (2010–present)

== Stadia ==
- Stadium by the Sea at Palisades Charter High School; Pacific Palisades, California (2009–2010)
- Titan Stadium at California State University, Fullerton; Fullerton, California 1 game (2009)
- Stadium at Crenshaw High School; Crenshaw, California (2011–present)
- Stadium at Rosemead High School; Rosemead, California (2011) 1 game

== Average attendance ==
Attendance stats are calculated by averaging each team's self-reported home attendances from the historical match archive at https://web.archive.org/web/20100105175057/http://www.uslsoccer.com/history/index_E.html.

- 2009: 113
- 2010: 145
