= The Men (1950 film) =

1950 film by Fred Zinnemann

- Theatrical poster
- Directed by: Fred Zinnemann
- Written by: Carl Foreman
- Produced by: Stanley Kramer
- Starring: Marlon Brando; Teresa Wright; Everett Sloane; Jack Webb; Richard Erdman; Virginia Farmer; Dorothy Tree; Howard St. John
- Cinematography: Robert De Grasse
- Edited by: Harry W. Gerstad
- Music by: Dimitri Tiomkin
- Production company: Stanley Kramer Productions
- Distributed by: United Artists
- Release date: July 20, 1950
- Running time: 87 minutes
- Country: United States
- Languages: English; Spanish
- Budget: $420,000
- Box office: $1,175,000

The Men is a 1950 American drama film set mostly in a paraplegic ward of a VA hospital. The film stars Marlon Brando (in his film debut) as ex-GI Ken who, as a result of a war wound, is paralyzed and a wheelchair user. Suffering from depression and an impaired self-concept, Ken struggles to cope with his disability and his need to accept care from others, including that of the woman who loves him.

The film was directed by Fred Zinnemann, written by Carl Foreman, produced by Stanley Kramer and stars Teresa Wright and Everett Sloane. It received generally favorable reviews and an Academy Award nomination for writing.

== Plot ==
During World War II, U.S. Army lieutenant Ken Wilocek is shot in the back by a sniper, injuring his spinal cord. In the years that follow, he faces a series of ongoing struggles in accepting his condition, in rehabilitation and in reentering society. Ken and Ellen, his fiancée, face challenges both as individuals and as a couple, before and after they marry. The other men in the Veterans Administration hospital experience a variety of events, such as a wedding celebration and a sudden death from meningitis. The medical team is led by Dr. Brock, who became involved with paraplegia after his wife was injured in a car accident many years earlier. He encourages Ken that his life is not over and that his wife's love will give him a chance to overcome his obstacles.

Faced with the reality of losing Ellen forever, Ken drives to Ellen's parents' home and rides his wheelchair up the steep walkway until a step blocks him. Ellen appears and Ken allows her to help him push his wheelchair into the house.

== Cast ==
- Marlon Brando as Ken Wilocek
- Teresa Wright as Ellen
- Everett Sloane as Dr. Brock
- Jack Webb as Norm
- Richard Erdman as Leo
- Arthur Jurado as Angel
- Virginia Farmer as Nurse Robbins
- Dorothy Tree as Ellen's Mother
- Howard St. John as Ellen's Father

Many of the patients and staff at the Birmingham Veterans Administration Hospital in Van Nuys, California, where much of the film was shot, appear in the film. These men include paraplegic Arthur Jurado, Dr. Norman Karr, physical therapist Helen Winston and nurses Rhoda Cormeny and Eunice Newberry.

== Production ==
The film opens with a dedication:

In all Wars [sic], since the beginning of History [sic], there have been men who fought twice. The first time they battled with club, sword or machine gun. The second time they had none of these weapons. Yet this by far, was the greatest battle. It was fought with abiding faith and raw courage and in the end, Victory [sic] was achieved. This is the story of such a group of men. To them this film is dedicated.

Marlon Brando spent a month at the VA hospital in preparation for the film. The situations and dialogue in the script were based on writer Carl Foreman's significant amount of time spent with patients at the hospital.

== Reception ==
The film was banned in the United Kingdom because of a scene in which Dr. Brock speaks to a group of wives, mothers, fiancées and girlfriends of patients. The subject of having children (and, by implication, sexual relations) with a paraplegic husband is discussed, and Brock tells them that the ability to beget children varies in individual cases but was unlikely overall.

In a contemporary review for The New York Times, critic Bosley Crowther called The Men a "a fine and arresting film drama" and wrote:

[N]othing yet demonstrated has so fully realized and portrayed—at least, to the public's comprehension—the inner torments, the despairs, the loneliness and the possible triumphs of a paraplegic as this picture does. ... [T]here is no wonder that a striking and authentic documentary quality has been imparted to the whole film in every detail, attitude and word. But the major accomplishment of these artists is the simplicity and eloquence with which they have shown the fundamental conflicts in a paraplegic's readjustment to life—the terrible, pathetic reluctance to give up hoping for a "return" and the forcing of the head to take over the life of the dead immobile legs. And in these demonstrations they have coincidently achieved an understanding of doctors, nurses, parents, sweethearts and wives ... Stern in its intimations of the terrible consequences of war, this film is a haunting and affecting, as well as a rewarding, drama to have at this time.

Critic Edwin Schallert of the Los Angeles Times wrote: "The subject of the picture is essentially poignant. The wages of war are felt throughout. Yet the optimistic trend which events take during the unfoldment, the theme of undying love finely expressed, and the enormous gayety which pervades certain scenes, in spite of their character, makes this an unusually engrossing screen offering. Notably the picture introduces a new and fascinating personality in Marlon Brando. around whose life pattern in his role of the handicapped veteran the action revolves."

== Reissue ==
The film was reissued by National Telefilm Associates under the title Battle Stripe together with the 1943 Lewis Milestone film The North Star, which was renamed Armored Attack.

== Awards ==
Carl Foreman was nominated for an Academy Award for Best Writing, Story and Screenplay.

The National Board of Review included the film in its annual list of the ten best films of the year.

== See also ==
- List of American films of 1950
