= Mutala Mohammed =

Ghanaian footballer (born 1988)

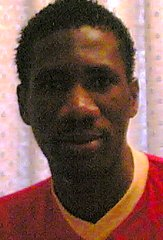

Personal information
- Date of birth: February 2, 1988 (age 38)
- Place of birth: Accra, Ghana
- Height: 6 ft 3 in (1.91 m)
- Positions: Defender; defensive midfielder

Team information
- Current team: Hollywood United Hitmen
- Number: 24

Senior career*
Years	Team	Apps	(Gls)
2005–2006	Real Sportive		
2006–2007	Asante Kotoko		
2008–2009	Étoile du Sahel		
2010–	Hollywood United Hitmen	15	(3)

International career
- Ghana U-20
- * Club domestic league appearances and goals as of August 7, 2010

Mutala Mohammed (born February 2, 1988, in Accra) is a Ghanaian footballer who currently plays for Hollywood United Hitmen in the USL Premier Development League.

== Career ==
=== Africa ===
Mohammed turned professional in 2005 at the age of 16 when he signed for Ghana Premier League team Real Sportive. After impressing during a game against them, he moved to league rivals Asante Kotoko midway through the 2006 season. He was an integral part of the Asante Kotoko team which competed in the 2006 CAF Champions League, scoring an important goal against Tunisian side CS Sfaxien.

Mohammed was due to move to Tunisia to play for Étoile du Sahel in 2007, but returned to Ghana prior to the 2007-2008 pre-season. Asante Kotoko.

After trialing with Syrian side Al-Shorta Damascus during the second half of 2007, Mohammed eventually signed for Étoile du Sahel for the 2008–2009 season, and he played for them in the Tunisian Ligue Professionnelle 1.

=== United States ===
Mohammed left Tunisia and came to the United States in 2009. After spending some time playing in local amateur leagues, including a period playing for the L.A. Blues, he joined the Hollywood United Hitmen of USL Premier Development League in 2010. He scored his first career senior goal for Hollywood on June 3, 2010, in a 3–0 win over the BYU Cougars, and went on to play 15 games for the Hitmen during the season, helping them qualify for the 2010 PDL playoffs.
