= Kyle Patterson =

English footballer (born 1986)

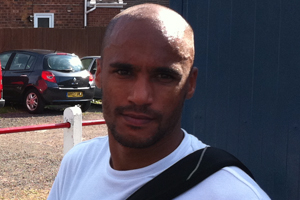
- Patterson in July 2011

Personal information
- Date of birth: 6 January 1986 (age 40)
- Place of birth: Birmingham, England
- Positions: Attacking midfielder; winger; forward

Youth career
- 1999–2004: West Bromwich Albion

College career
Years	Team	Apps	(Gls)
2005–2008	Saint Louis Billikens		

Senior career*
Years	Team	Apps	(Gls)
2005	TP-47	11	(2)
2008	St. Louis Lions	6	(0)
2009	Los Angeles Galaxy	3	(0)
2009	→ Hollywood United (loan)	1	(1)
2010	GAIS	10	(0)
2010–2011	Hednesford Town	22	(14)
2011–2012	Tamworth	41	(5)
2012	Nuneaton Town	8	(0)
2013	→ Worcester City (loan)	9	(2)
2013	→ Hednesford Town (loan)	8	(1)
2013–2014	Redditch United	10	(2)
2013–2014	→ Halesowen Town (loan)	6	(1)
2014–2015	Shepshed Dynamo		
2015–2016	Hednesford Town		
2016–2017	Redditch United		
2019–2024	Lichfield City		

Managerial career
- 2016: Hednesford Town
- 2016–2017: Redditch United (assistant)
- * Club domestic league appearances and goals as of 2 September 2019

Kyle James N. Patterson (born 6 January 1986) is an English former footballer who played as a midfielder.

== Playing career ==
=== Youth and college ===
Patterson was signed by English club West Bromwich Albion's youth academy in 1999 at the age of thirteen, and subsequently spent five years with the club, scoring more than 50 goals for the club while winning the Youth Alliance League and Midland Youth Cup.

Patterson played with Finnish club TP-47 from January 2005 to December 2005, before moving to the United States to play college soccer at St. Louis University, where he was named the Atlantic 10 Offensive Player of the Year in 2007.

During his collegiate years Patterson also played in the USL Premier Development League with St. Louis Lions.

=== Professional ===
Patterson was drafted in the fourth round (48th overall) of the 2009 MLS SuperDraft by Los Angeles Galaxy. He made his professional debut on 22 March 2009, in Galaxy's first game of the 2009 MLS season against D.C. United, and provided the assist on Landon Donovan's equalising goal.

With the MLS Reserve Division having been scrapped at the end of 2008, Galaxy briefly loaned Patterson to the Hollywood United Hitmen of the USL Premier Development League to maintain his match fitness levels. He made his debut, and scored a goal, in Hollywood's 4–0 victory over Ventura County Fusion on 8 May 2009.

Patterson was waived by Galaxy on 25 November 2009, having played in three MLS games for the team, and later signed with the Swedish Allsvenskan club GAIS.

Patterson left GAIS later that year, and after attending trials with several professional clubs in England, joined Hednesford Town. He made his debut on 30 August against Didcot Town, scoring twice in a 3–0 win.

=== Tamworth ===
On 14 June 2011, Patterson was confirmed as Marcus Law's first signing for Tamworth, Patterson signed a one-year contract with the club holding another year's option.

=== Nuneaton Town ===
With a day to go until the first game of the season, Patterson left The Lambs to join local rivals Nuneaton Town.

=== Hednesford Town ===
On 21 February 2013, Patterson joined one of his former clubs, Hednesford Town, on loan for the rest of the 2012–13 season.

=== Redditch United ===
On 17 May 2016, Patterson was named as assistant manager to Darren Byfield at Redditch United.

=== Retirement ===
Patterson announced his retirement from football on 7 January 2024, having finished his career with Lichfield City.

== Career statistics ==
Statistics accurate as of match played 28 April 2012.

Club performance			League		Cup		League Cup		Continental		Total	
Season	Club	League	Apps	Goals	Apps	Goals	Apps	Goals	Apps	Goals	Apps	Goals
USA			League		Open Cup		League Cup		North America		Total	
2008	St. Louis Lions	USL Premier Development League	6	0	0	0	0	0	0	0	6	0
2009	Los Angeles Galaxy	Major League Soccer	3	0	0	0	0	0	0	0	3	0
2009	→ Hollywood United Hitmen (loan)	USL Premier Development League	1	1	0	0	0	0	0	0	1	1
Sweden			League		Svenska Cupen		League Cup		Europe		Total	
2010	GAIS	Allsvenskan	10	0	0	0	0	0	0	0	10	0
England			League		FA Cup		League Cup		Europe		Total	
2010–11	Hednesford Town	Southern League Premier Division	22	14	0	0	0	0	0	0	22	14
2011–12	Tamworth	Conference National	41	5	5	3	0	0	0	0	46	8
2012–13	Nuneaton Town	Conference National	0	0	0	0	0	0	0	0	0	0
Total	USA		10	1	0	0	0	0	0	0	10	1
Total	Sweden		10	0	0	0	0	0	0	0	10	0
Total	England		63	19	5	3	0	0	0	0	68	22
Career total			83	20	5	3	0	0	0	0	88	23
