= Birmingham General Hospital, California =

US WWII army base in California

Birmingham General Hospital
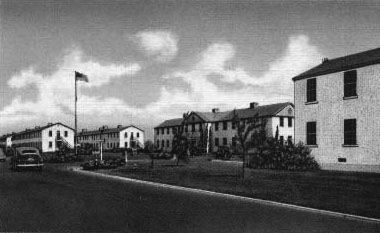
- Birmingham General Hospital, 1945

- Location within California Location within the Los Angeles metropolitan area
- 34°11′32″N 118°30′22″W
- Location: Van Nuys, California

History
- Built: Open August 24, 1943 (closed 1950)

Site notes
- Area: 131 acres (53 ha)
- Architect: US Army

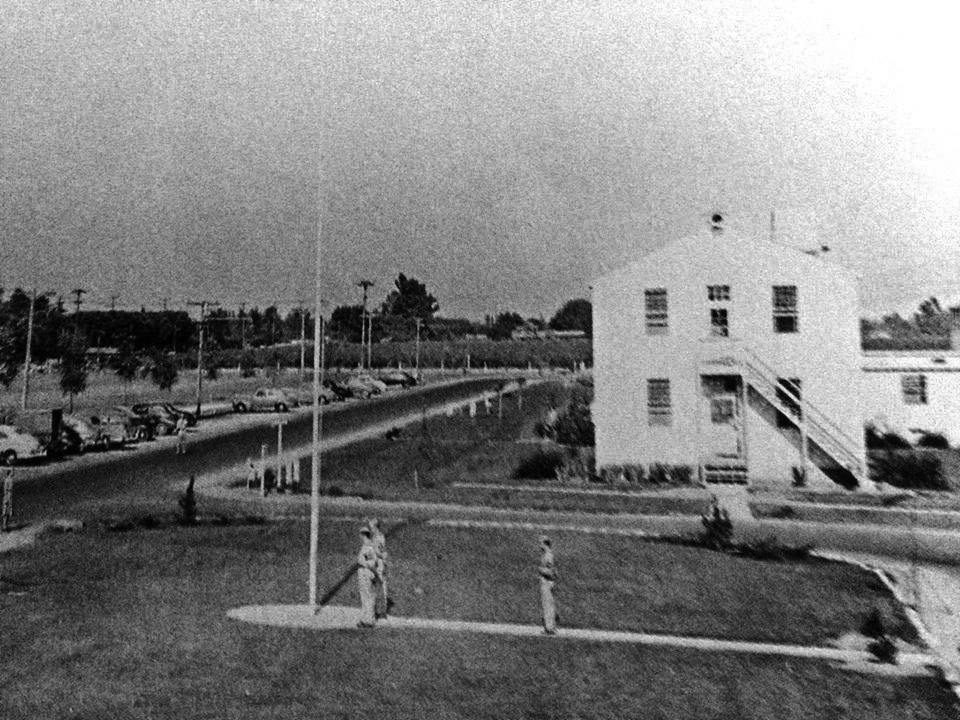
Birmingham General Hospital Flag Pole, used for a US Medal Ceremony for an injured Vet in 1945

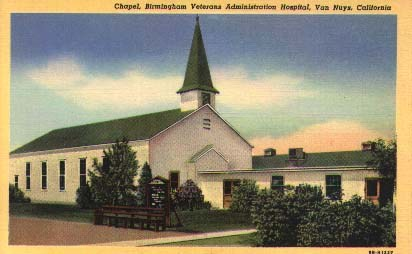
Birmingham General Hospital chapel

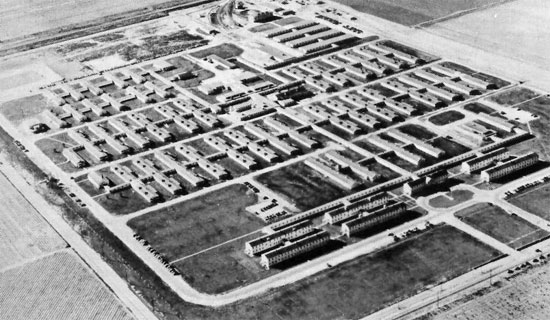
Birmingham General Hospital in 1945

Birmingham General Hospital was a World War II US Army Hospital in Van Nuys, California at the corner of Vanowen Street and Balboa Boulevard. The hospital was built in 1942 and 1943 to care for troops returning home from oversea service. The first patient checked-in on August 24, 1943. The hospital had 1,777 beds housed in single-story buildings over the 131-acre campus.

== Birmingham General Hospital ==
For a short time when it opened, Birmingham General Hospital was called Van Nuys General Hospital, but was renamed Birmingham General Hospital after Brigadier General Henry Patrick Birmingham (1854–1932), of the U.S. Army Medical Corps. The War Department approved the construction of the hospital on August 24, 1943. The land was farm land of the Encino Rancho and the Petit Ranch. The 80 single-story buildings were made of brick and some stucco. The hospital also had a chapel, rehabilitation pool, gymnasium, fire station, bomb shelter, kitchen, movie theater, racquetball/handball court, Pacific Electric street car station (possibly Van Nuys station) and a Prisoners of War (POW) wing. An Italian Service Unit with 40 Italian POWs from the North African campaign volunteered at the hospital. The Army hospital worked on general medicine of returning Veterans. There was special care for Vets with central nervous system syphilis, rheumatic fever, quadriplegic and paraplegic and shell shock. Due to the war efforts Penicillin was being mass-produced by 1944. The Hospital made use of this new wonder drug in helping Vets. The hospital was also one of the first to use an antibiotic ointment on patients. Maj. Joseph Weinberg used the new antibiotic ointment to help patients with infected compound fractures. The hospital also had a wing for women vets, women that served in WAVES (Women Accepted for Volunteer Emergency Service), Women's Army Corps and Army nurses. For returning Vets, 800 beds were used for debarkation medical work. The first commander of the hospital was Col. Alvin C. Miller, from the US Army's Pearl Harbor Army hospital. Chief of the medical rehabilitation was Jack W. Gregory. Birmingham General Hospital also had a unit to modify cars for those that lost the use of their legs, to drive with hands only. Actress Susan Peters also received a modified Birmingham car after a hunting accident.

After the war on 31 March 1946, the hospital was turned over to the Veterans Administration and renamed Birmingham Veterans Administration Hospital. The veterans' organization Paralyzed Veterans of America was started at this hospital. The VA Hospital closed in 1950, the Vets at Birmingham were moved to the Veterans Administration Long Beach Hospital. In 1952 the hospital was sold to the Los Angeles City Schools for $1.00. Los Angeles City School opened Birmingham High School - Birmingham Community Charter High School (BCCHS) on 1953, it served grades seven to 12. Mrs. Albert Zoraster, a member of the Havenhurst Elementary School P.T.A, was credited with having the vision of using the former hospital as a school. Congressman Joseph F. Holt helped make her vision a reality. The school's principal, Dr. John I. Abbott, quickly transformed the shuttered hospital grounds into a school facility. For example, the chapel was converted into a drama classroom. Some original VA buildings, along with the old pools, are still on the high school campus. The land also is used for the current Mulholland Junior High - William Mulholland Middle School.

Part of the land was retained by the US Army and used for Cold War air defense missile battalion headquarters of the 551st Anti-Aircraft Artillery Missile Battalion, and later the 4th Battalion, 65th Artillery, up until November 1968. This headquarters facility was responsible for the management of Nike Missile Control Sites in the Los Angeles area which operated Nike Ajax missiles and Nike Hercules missiles.

== Ernest Bors ==
In 1945 the US Army opened the first Spinal Cord Injury Center at Birmingham General Army Hospital. The Center used the work of Doctor Ernest Bors (1900–1990), who was one of the foremost experts on neurourology in traumatic spinal cord injury. Bors had developed a holistic multidisciplinary approach for treating spinal cord injury which is still used in care centers. At Birmingham General Hospital, Bors treated up to 220 Vets. From around the world, other military doctors visited Birmingham General Hospital so as to learn about these new medical techniques.

== Hollywood ==
The hospital was located 13 miles north of Hollywood; as such, many Hollywood actors and actress came to visit the servicemen. Hollywood Radio personalities also visited the hospital. During late 1944, the Jack Benny Christmas program was broadcast from the hospital. Among these regular visitors were: Ronald Reagan, Anne Jeffreys, Basil Rathbone, Mary Pickford, Linda Darnell, Al Pearce, Charles Laughton, June Haver, Jimmy Stewart, Bagelman Sisters, Clarence Nash, The Charioteers and Bob Hope.

The hospital was used for the 1950 Hollywood movie The Men which was Marlon Brando's first film; in it, he plays the part of an injured-in-combat World War II veteran. Brando lived as a wheelchair-user for several weeks among the patients in preparation for the role. Birmingham General Hospital was used along with its actual name in the 1950 movie Backfire. The movie was inspired by the work carried out at Birmingham General Hospital's Spinal Cord Injury Center. The main actor plays an injured Vet who falls in love with a Birmingham General Hospital nurse.

Desi Arnaz was stationed at Birmingham General Hospital during the war to entertain the troops there with the United Service Organizations (USO). Arnaz had a bad knee and so was transferred to the US Army Medical Corps. Arnaz also coordinated with the stars that visited the hospital. Arnaz was discharged on November 16, 1945.

=== This Is Your Life ===
The TV show This Is Your Life came about as an idea for a radio show for a veteran at the hospital. The show was created by Ralph Edwards in 1948. The US Army asked Edwards to "do something" for paraplegic soldiers at the hospital. In This Is Your Life the host would surprise one person by bringing on guests from that person's life in front of an audience. The people from the person's life could be colleagues, friends, and family. A Vet down on his luck was picked as the first person on the show Truth or Consequences. The show was a hit and This Is Your Life was started as its own show.

== Current Land Use ==
The Birmingham grounds are now home to Birmingham Community High School, High Tech Los Angeles, Daniel Pearl Magnet High School, Valley Alternative School, Mulholland Middle School, and LAUSD offices.

== See also ==
- California during World War II
- American Theater (1939–1945)
- Desert Training Center
- United States home front during World War II
- Veterans Health Administration
- DeWitt General Hospital
