= Ernest Bors =

American physician

Ernest Herman Joseph Bors, MD (February 23, 1900, Prague – September 26, 1990) was a Czech-born American physician. He was a pioneer in the multidisciplinary care of individuals with spinal cord injury (SCI).

== Biography ==
Bors was born in Prague, Austria-Hungary on February 23, 1900, and grew up there too. He earned his medical degree in 1925, at Charles University in Prague, Czechoslovakia. Early in his career he studied anatomy and held research and faculty positions at the universities in Zürich, Switzerland and Freiburg im Breisgau, Germany. In 1938, he emigrated to the United States where he became a citizen. At the outbreak of World War II, Bors joined the Army Medical Corps.

Bors became interested in spinal cord injury while caring for veterans after the war. In 1944, he joined the staff of Hammond General Army Hospital in Modesto, California. As assistant chief of urology, Bors was urology consultant to the hospital's Spinal Cord Injury Care Section. At that time, comprehensive care for the injured veterans was hindered by a lack of a cohesive approach to their complex medical and social problems. Bors was appalled by the lack of specific interventions for bladder management and other conditions secondary to spinal cord injury. He was motivated to devote his career to improving every aspect of the care of individuals with spinal cord injury.

As a result of his experiences, Bors became the foremost expert on neurourology in traumatic spinal cord injury. He also developed a holistic multidisciplinary approach that formed the foundation for modern spinal cord injury care centers. His successful organization of a comprehensive specialized ward attracted the attention of the War Department. Modeled on Bors' innovative approach, in 1945, the War Department opened the first Spinal Cord Injury Center in the United States at Birmingham General Army Hospital in Van Nuys, California, with Bors in charge. Soon, he had 220 patients under his care. Military doctors from around the country visited his facility and began to establish similar centers around the country.

In 1958, Bors helped oversee the construction of a new facility dedicated to the SCI Service, which is now known as VA Long Beach Healthcare System. For the next two decades, doctors and administrators from around the world observed the innovative work of Bors and his colleague, Dr. Estin Comarr. By 1970, the year he retired, Bors had overseen the care of more than 2,500 people with SCI. Through his efforts, the number of SCI centers increased in the US, as well as the staff-to-patient ratio. Bors authored more than 140 scientific papers and a major textbook, co-authored by Estin Comarr and titled, Neurological Urology, Physiology of Micturition, its Neurological Disorders and Sequelae, which remains the authoritative text in this field.

Bors is recognized as a pioneer who "carried the torch of care and research and opened the way for better care" of all individuals with spinal cord injury. He is memorialized by The Ernest Bors Award for Scientific Development, which is administered by the Journal of Spinal Cord Medicine, the official journal of the American Paraplegia Society. The annual award recognizes the best article published in the Journal by a young investigator.
