= Air Carrier Access Act =

United States transportation legislation

- Other short titles: Air Carrier Access Act of 1986
- Long title: An Act to prohibit commercial airlines from discriminating against passengers with disabilities.
- Acronyms (colloquial): ACAA
- Enacted by: the 99th United States Congress
- Effective: October 2, 1986

Citations
- Statutes at Large: 99 Stat. 435

Codification
- Acts amended: Federal Aviation Act of 1958
- U.S.C. sections created: 49 U.S.C. § 41705

Legislative history
- Introduced in the Senate as S. 2703 by Sen. Robert J. Dole (R–KS) on July 30, 1986; Committee consideration by Senate Commerce, Science, and Transportation; House Public Works and Transportation; Passed the Senate on August 15, 1986 (Passed without amendment by voice vote); Passed the House on September 18, 1986 (Passed by voice vote); Signed into law by President Ronald Reagan on October 2, 1986

The Air Carrier Access Act of 1986 (ACAA) is Title 49, Section 41705 of the U.S. Code.

== Legal passage ==
The Act amended the earlier section 404(b) of the Federal Aviation Act of 1958 (FAA), which was repealed by the Airline Deregulation Act of 1978. The ACAA prohibits commercial airlines from discriminating against passengers with disabilities. The act was passed by the U.S. Congress in direct response to a narrow interpretation of Section 504 of the Rehabilitation Act of 1973 by the U.S. Supreme Court in U.S. Department of Transportation (DOT) v. Paralyzed Veterans of America (PVA). In PVA, the Supreme Court held that private, commercial air carriers are not liable under Section 504 because they are not "direct recipients" of federal funding to airports.

== Purpose ==
The Act was construed to contain an implied private right of action. However, in 2001, the U.S. Supreme Court decided Alexander v. Sandoval, which held that federal courts may not find an implied private right unless a statute gives explicit indication that Congress intended to bestow such a right. In 2004, the U.S. Court of Appeals for the Tenth Circuit followed the lead of the US Court of Appeals for the Eleventh Circuit, which relied on the Sandoval decision to hold that the Act can only be enforced by filing an administrative complaint with the DOT.

== Later developments ==
In 2013, the DOT provided new rules requiring all domestic and foreign air carriers to have accessible websites and kiosks. By December 12, 2015, the core functionality of all air carrier's websites needed to be accessible, and by December 12, 2016, the remaining web pages were required to be accessible.

In 2022, it was announced that the DOT had published the Airline Passengers with Disabilities Bill of Rights. It (as stated by the DOT) “describes the fundamental rights of air travelers with disabilities under the Air Carrier Access Act and its implementing regulation, 14 Code of Federal Regulations (CFR) Part 382.”

In 2024, a rule was issued by the Secretary of Transportation making it an automatic violation of the Air Carrier Access Act to mishandle wheelchairs.

== Service animals ==
Since this act prohibits airlines from discriminating against passengers with disabilities, they must allow them to bring along their service animals. In recent years, people were taking advantage of this act. Delta Air Lines released the statistic that they had seen an 84% increase in animal incidents. Not all of the disability animals that came through the doors of Delta Air Lines, however, were actually service animals. Since December 2020, the U.S. Department of Transportation (DOT) does not include emotional support animals in the Air Carrier Access Act, which is the act that allows service animals to fly on airplanes if they meet requirements. Before December 2020, they did include emotional support animals in their definition of service animals (US Department of Transportation, 2020).
