= Inter Tijuana =

- Full name: Club Atlético Inter Tijuana
- Nickname: Lions
- Founded: 2010
- Ground: Auditorio Municipal de Tijuana
- Capacity: 4,800
- Coach: (Mexico) Julio Martinez
- League: (United States) Major League Futsal USA

Founded in 2010, the Inter Tijuana is a Mexican professional futsal team; team based in Tijuana, Mexico.
