= SCI/D =

SCI/D refers to anyone with a spinal cord injury or spinal cord disorder. The spinal cord can be damaged in many ways that can provide a variety of symptoms. It can be cut, bruised, or compressed in an accident, injured by infection, damaged when its blood supply is cut off, or affected by diseases that alter its nerve function.

== Causes ==
- Spinal cord injury
- Amyotrophic lateral sclerosis (Lou Gehrig’s disease)
- Multiple sclerosis
- Poliomyelitis (Polio)
- Spina bifida
- Transverse myelitis
- Syringomyelia
