= 2013 Los Angeles Galaxy season =

American soccer club season

Los Angeles Galaxy
2013 season
- Owner: Philip Anschutz (AEG)
- Coach: Bruce Arena
- Major League Soccer: Conference: 3rd Overall: 5th
- MLS Cup playoffs: Conference semifinals
- CONCACAF Champions League (12–13): Semifinals
- CONCACAF Champions League (13–14): Group stage
- U.S. Open Cup: Third round
- Top goalscorer: League: Robbie Keane (16); All: Robbie Keane (19)
Home colors	Away colors	Third colors

The 2013 Los Angeles Galaxy season was the club's eighteenth season of existence, and their eighteenth season in Major League Soccer, the top tier of the American and Canadian soccer pyramids.

The Galaxy entered the season as the two-time defending MLS Cup champions. They were eliminated by Real Salt Lake in the Conference Semifinals of the MLS Cup Playoffs. The team reached the semifinals of the 2012–13 CONCACAF Champions League, where they were knocked out by Monterrey. The Galaxy also qualified for the 2013–14 CONCACAF Champions League by virtue of winning the 2012 MLS Cup.

== Club ==
=== Roster ===
Note: Flags indicate national team as defined under FIFA eligibility rules; some limited exceptions apply. Players may hold more than one non-FIFA nationality. Squad correct as of March 2, 2013.

No.	Pos.	Nation	Player
1	GK	ITA	Carlo Cudicini
2	DF	USA	Todd Dunivant
4	DF	USA	Omar Gonzalez
5	DF	USA	Sean Franklin
6	MF	USA	Pablo Mastroeni
7	FW	IRL	Robbie Keane (DP / Captain)
8	MF	BRA	Marcelo Sarvas
10	FW	USA	Landon Donovan (DP / vice-captain)
11	MF	USA	Colin Clark
12	GK	USA	Brian Rowe
14	MF	USA	Robbie Rogers
15	MF	FRA	Laurent Courtois
16	MF	USA	Hector Jiménez
18	GK	PAN	Jaime Penedo
19	MF	BRA	Juninho
20	DF	USA	A. J. DeLaGarza
21	DF	USA	Tommy Meyer
22	DF	BRA	Leonardo
24	GK	USA	Brian Perk
25	MF	USA	Rafael Garcia
26	MF	USA	Michael Stephens
27	FW	USA	Charlie Rugg
28	DF	USA	Kofi Opare
29	FW	USA	Gyasi Zardes (HGP)
30	FW	USA	Chandler Hoffman
32	FW	USA	Jack McBean (HGP)
33	MF	USA	Jose Villarreal (HGP)
35	DF	USA	Greg Cochrane
36	DF	USA	Oscar Sorto (HGP)

== Competitions ==
=== Preseason ===
February 1, 2013	Los Angeles Galaxy	5–0	United States U-17	Carson, California
15:30 PDT		Report		Stadium: The Home Depot Center; Attendance: Closed door

February 5, 2013	Los Angeles Galaxy	3–0	Los Angeles Blues	Carson, California
15:30 PDT	Hall 4' (o.g.); Keane 15'; Clark (yellow card) 41'; Villarreal 76' (yellow card) 82'	Report		Stadium: The Home Depot Center; Attendance: Closed door

February 8, 2013	Los Angeles Galaxy	0–1	Real Salt Lake	Carson, California
14:30 PDT		Report	Grabavoy 27'	Stadium: The Home Depot Center; Attendance: Closed door

February 13, 2013	Los Angeles Galaxy	7–2	UCLA Bruins	Carson, California
12:30 PDT	Stephens 13'; Gonzalez 29'; Franklin 41', 45'; Jimenez 57'; Rugg 64', 78'	Report	Williams 66'; Raynr 82'	Stadium: The Home Depot Center; Attendance: Closed door

February 16, 2013	Los Angeles Galaxy	0–0	Gangwon	Carson, California
11:30 PDT		Report		Stadium: The Home Depot Center; Attendance: Closed door

February 19, 2013	Los Angeles Galaxy	6–2	Club Tijuana	Carson, California
19:30 PDT	Keane 4'; Leonardo 36'; Gaul (yellow card) 18' (goal) 65', 90+1'; DeLaGarza (yellow card) 41'; R. Garcia (red card) 47'; Jiménez 80'; McBean (yellow card) 77' (goal) 84'	Report	Ortiz (yellow card) 24'; Santiago (yellow card) 34'; L. García 69'; Trujillo (red card) 72'; Carmona (yellow card) 73'; Piceno 83'	Stadium: The Home Depot Center; Attendance: 12,000

February 22, 2013	Los Angeles Galaxy	2–1	Colorado Rapids	Goleta, California
19:30 PDT	Sarvas 36'; Keane (yellow card) 58'; Stephens (yellow card) 68'; McBean 80'	Report	Moor 12'; Thomas (yellow card) 44'	Stadium: Harder Stadium; Attendance: 12,000

=== MLS ===
==== Standings ====
Western Conference Table

Pos	Team	Pld	W	L	T	GF	GA	GD	Pts	Qualification
1	Portland Timbers	34	14	5	15	54	33	+21	57	MLS Cup Conference Semifinals
2	Real Salt Lake	34	16	10	8	57	41	+16	56	MLS Cup Conference Semifinals
3	LA Galaxy	34	15	11	8	53	38	+15	53	MLS Cup Conference Semifinals
4	Seattle Sounders FC	34	15	12	7	42	42	0	52	MLS Cup Knockout Round
5	Colorado Rapids	34	14	11	9	45	38	+7	51	MLS Cup Knockout Round
6	San Jose Earthquakes	34	14	11	9	35	42	−7	51	
7	Vancouver Whitecaps FC	34	13	12	9	53	45	+8	48	
8	FC Dallas	34	11	12	11	48	52	−4	44	
9	Chivas USA	34	6	20	8	30	67	−37	26	

Source: MLS

Overall table

Pos	Team	Pld	W	L	T	GF	GA	GD	Pts	Qualification
1	New York Red Bulls (S)	34	17	9	8	58	41	+17	59	CONCACAF Champions League
2	Sporting Kansas City (C)	34	17	10	7	47	30	+17	58	CONCACAF Champions League
3	Portland Timbers	34	14	5	15	54	33	+21	57	CONCACAF Champions League
4	Real Salt Lake	34	16	10	8	57	41	+16	56	
5	LA Galaxy	34	15	11	8	53	38	+15	53	
6	Seattle Sounders FC	34	15	12	7	42	42	0	52	
7	New England Revolution	34	14	11	9	49	38	+11	51	
8	Colorado Rapids	34	14	11	9	45	38	+7	51	
9	Houston Dynamo	34	14	11	9	41	41	0	51	
10	San Jose Earthquakes	34	14	11	9	35	42	−7	51	
11	Montreal Impact	34	14	13	7	50	49	+1	49	CONCACAF Champions League
12	Chicago Fire	34	14	13	7	47	52	−5	49	
13	Vancouver Whitecaps FC	34	13	12	9	53	45	+8	48	
14	Philadelphia Union	34	12	12	10	42	44	−2	46	
15	FC Dallas	34	11	12	11	48	52	−4	44	
16	Columbus Crew	34	12	17	5	42	46	−4	41	
17	Toronto FC	34	6	17	11	30	47	−17	29	
18	Chivas USA	34	6	20	8	30	67	−37	26	
19	D.C. United	34	3	24	7	22	59	−37	16	CONCACAF Champions League

Source: MLS
Rules for classification: 1) points; 2) head-to-head record; 3) goal difference; 4) number of goals scored
(C) MLS Cup Champion; (S) Supporters' Shield

==== Match results ====
March 3, 2013 1	Los Angeles Galaxy	4–0	Chicago Fire	Carson, California
19:00 PDT	Magee 38', 68', 74'; Dunivant (yellow card) 75'; Keane 80'	Report		Stadium: The Home Depot Center; Attendance: 20,127; Referee: Kevin Stott

March 17, 2013 2	Los Angeles Galaxy	1–1	Chivas USA	Carson, California
14:00 PDT	Franklin (yellow card) 27'; Sarvas (yellow card) 32'; McBean 83'; Keane (yellow card) 90+4'	Report	Iraheta (yellow card) 22'; Velázquez (yellow card) 40' (red card); Álvarez 89'	Stadium: The Home Depot Center; Attendance: 19,117; Referee: Ricardo Salazar

March 23, 2013 3	Los Angeles Galaxy	1–0	Colorado Rapids	Carson, California
19:30 PDT	Magee 50' (pen.); Sarvas (yellow card) 73'	Report	Moor (red card) 48'; Thomas (yellow card) 64'	Stadium: The Home Depot Center; Attendance: 19,936; Referee: Armando Villarreal

March 30, 2013 4	Toronto FC	2–2	Los Angeles Galaxy	Toronto, Ontario, Canada
11:00 PDT	Earnshaw 29'; Califf (yellow card) 51'; Osorio 78'	Report	Magee 16'; Sarvas (yellow card) 76'; Villarreal 90+2'	Stadium: BMO Field; Attendance: 18,355; Referee: Hilario Grajeda

April 13, 2013 5	FC Dallas	1–0	Los Angeles Galaxy	Frisco, Texas
16:30 PDT	Jackson (yellow card) 53'; John 87'	Report	Gonzalez (yellow card) 52'; Leonardo (red card) 60'; Magee (yellow card) 77'	Stadium: FC Dallas Stadium; Attendance: 20,465; Referee: Baldomero Toledo

April 20, 2013 6	Los Angeles Galaxy	2–0	Sporting Kansas City	Carson, California
19:30 PDT	Sarvas 27'; Donovan 74'	Report	Joseph (yellow card) 64'	Stadium: The Home Depot Center; Attendance: 25,908; Referee: Jair Marrufo

April 27, 2013 7	Real Salt Lake	0–2	Los Angeles Galaxy	Sandy, Utah
18:00 PDT	Palmer (yellow card) 19'	Report	Magee 6'; Rugg 13'; Juninho (yellow card) 54'	Stadium: Rio Tinto Stadium; Attendance: 17,655; Referee: Edvin Jurisevic

May 5, 2013 8	Los Angeles Galaxy	0–1	Houston Dynamo	Carson, California
20:00 PDT		Report	Driver 56'	Stadium: The Home Depot Center; Attendance: 20,071; Referee: Allen Chapman

May 11, 2013 9	Vancouver Whitecaps FC	3–1	Los Angeles Galaxy	Vancouver, British Columbia
16:00 PDT	Leveron (yellow card) 3'; Teibert 63', 76', (yellow card) 76'; Mattocks 92+'	Report	Zardes 86'	Stadium: BC Place; Attendance: 21,000; Referee: Sorin Stoica

May 15, 2013 10	Philadelphia Union	1–4	Los Angeles Galaxy	Chester, Pennsylvania
16:30 PDT	Okugo 23', (yellow card) 90+1'; Soumare (yellow card) 53'; Gaddis (yellow card) 68'	Report	MacMath 3' (o.g.); Keane 71'; Jiménez 80'; Franklin (yellow card) 85'; Donovan 87'	Stadium: PPL Park; Attendance: 17,031; Referee: Ismail Elfath

May 19, 2013 11	New York Red Bulls	1–0	Los Angeles Galaxy	Harrison, New Jersey
10:00 PDT	Henry (yellow card) 87'; Cahill 91+'	Report	DeLaGarza (yellow card) 34'	Stadium: Red Bull Arena; Attendance: 25,219; Referee: Silviu Petrescu

May 26, 2013 12	Los Angeles Galaxy	4–0	Seattle Sounders FC	Carson, California
20:00 PDT	Franklin 12'; Keane 24', 34' (pen.), 44' (pen.); Zardes (yellow card) 40'; Gonzalez (yellow card) 70'	Report	Evans (yellow card) 43'; Johnson (yellow card) 65'; Joseph (red card) 87'	Stadium: The Home Depot Center; Attendance: 24,811; Referee: Baldomero Toledo

June 2, 2013 13	New England Revolution	5–0	Los Angeles Galaxy	Foxborough, Massachusetts
13:00 PDT	Sène 34'; Nguyen 71'; Kelyn Rowe (yellow card) 75', (goal) 94+'; Fagundez 87'; Barrett 91+'	Report	Donovan (yellow card) 72'; Sarvas (yellow card) 93+'	Stadium: Gillette Stadium; Attendance: 19,120; Referee: Fotis Bazakos

June 8, 2013 14	Real Salt Lake	3–1	Los Angeles Galaxy	Sandy, Utah
18:30 PDT	Stephenson 44'; Beckerman (yellow card) 54'; Wingert (yellow card) 79'; García 79', 90+'	Report	Donovan 45+'; Sarvas (yellow card) 90+'	Stadium: Rio Tinto Stadium; Attendance: 18,962; Referee: Drew Fischer

June 19, 2013 15	Los Angeles Galaxy	0–0	Portland Timbers	Carson, California
19:30 PDT	DeLaGarza (yellow card) 73'	Report	Kah (yellow card) 7'	Stadium: StubHub Center; Attendance: 23,675; Referee: Allen Chapman

June 23, 2013 16	Chivas USA	0–1	Los Angeles Galaxy	Carson, California
20:00 PDT	Vilchez (yellow card) 82'	Report	Zardes 44'; Dunivant (yellow card) 90'	Stadium: StubHub Center; Attendance: 14,575; Referee: Hilario Grajeda

June 29, 2013 17	San Jose Earthquakes	3–2	Los Angeles Galaxy	Stanford, California
19:30 PDT	Gordon 68', 93+' (yellow card) 94+'; Bernardez (yellow card) 69' (yellow-red card) 77'; Salinas 92+'	Report	Sarvas 20' (yellow card) 79'; Jiménez 65'	Stadium: Stanford Stadium; Attendance: 50,028; Referee: Armando Villarreal

July 4, 2013 18	Los Angeles Galaxy	2–1	Columbus Crew	Carson, California
19:30 PDT	Keane 85' (pen.), 92+' (pen.)	Report	Oduro (yellow card) 43'; Williams (yellow card) 66'; Anor 78' (yellow card) 92+'	Stadium: StubHub Center; Attendance: 24,180; Referee: Sorin Stoica

July 7, 2013 19	Los Angeles Galaxy	2–0	FC Dallas	Carson, California
19:30 PDT	Juninho (yellow card) 29'; Sarvas 65'; Jiménez 80'	Report	Ferreira (yellow card) 28'	Stadium: StubHub Center; Attendance: 19,729; Referee: Ricardo Salazar

July 13, 2013 20	Portland Timbers	2–1	Los Angeles Galaxy	Portland, Oregon
20:00 PDT	Johnson 27' (yellow card) 42'; Chara (yellow card) 40'; Ricketts (yellow card) 92+'; Jean-Baptiste 94+' (yellow card) 95+'	Report	Sarvas 17' (yellow card) 40'; DeLaGarza (yellow card) 30'; Cudicini (yellow card) 97+'	Stadium: JELD-WEN Field; Attendance: 20,674; Referee: Baldomero Toledo

July 20, 2013 21	Los Angeles Galaxy	2–1	Vancouver Whitecaps FC	Carson, California
19:30 PDT	Villarreal 29'; Zardes 56'; Juninho (yellow card) 72'	Report	Sanvezzo 19'; Koffie (yellow card) 32'; Reo-Coker (yellow card) 37'; Davidson (yellow card) 51'	Stadium: StubHub Center; Attendance: 20,093; Referee: Chris Penso

July 27, 2013 22	Colorado Rapids	2–0	Los Angeles Galaxy	Commerce City, Colorado
18:00 PDT	Thomas (yellow card) 9' (goal) 41'; Powers 47'	Report	Juninho (yellow card) 29'; Mastroeni (yellow card) 30'	Stadium: Dick's Sporting Goods Park; Attendance: 15,765; Referee: Juan Guzman

August 11, 2013 23	FC Dallas	3–3	Los Angeles Galaxy	Frisco, Texas
17:00 PDT	Hedges 15' (yellow card) 45+1'; Pérez 48', 86'; Benitez (yellow card) 69'; Michel (yellow card) 88'	Report	Franklin (yellow card) 29'; Donovan 45+1', 73', 82'; Leonardo (yellow card) 85'; Cudicini (yellow card) 86'	Stadium: FC Dallas Stadium; Attendance: 18,161; Referee: Silviu Petrescu

August 17, 2013 24	Los Angeles Galaxy	4–2	Real Salt Lake	Carson, California
19:30 PDT	Keane 56', 67', 86'; Gonzalez 75'	Report	Plata 53'; Beckerman (yellow card) 57'; Findley 90+5'	Stadium: StubHub Center; Attendance: 24,237; Referee: Hilario Grajeda

August 24, 2013 25	Vancouver Whitecaps FC	0–1	Los Angeles Galaxy	Vancouver, British Columbia
18:00 PDT	Koffie (yellow card) 55'; Lee (yellow card) 73'; Reo-Coker (yellow card) 90+1'	Report	Donovan 3'	Stadium: BC Place; Attendance: 21,000; Referee: Armando Villarreal

August 31, 2013 26	Los Angeles Galaxy	3–0	San Jose Earthquakes	Carson, California
19:30 PDT	Donovan 26'; Keane 43' (pen.), 67'	Report		Stadium: StubHub Center; Attendance: 27,000; Referee: Kevin Stott

September 7, 2013 27	Los Angeles Galaxy	0–1	Colorado Rapids	Carson, California
19:30 PDT	Juninho (yellow card) 49'	Report	Powers (yellow card) 54'; Buddle 75'	Stadium: StubHub Center; Attendance: 20,801; Referee: Allen Chapman

September 14, 2013 28	D.C. United	2–2	Los Angeles Galaxy	Washington D.C.
14:00 PDT	Pontius 39'; Porter 84'	Report	Keane 7'; Stephens 81'	Stadium: RFK Stadium; Attendance: 16,233

September 21, 2013 29	Los Angeles Galaxy	1–1	Seattle Sounders FC	Carson, California
19:30 PDT	Juninho 45+2'	Report	Johnson 25'; Scott (yellow card) 45+1' (yellow-red card) 90'; Alonso (yellow card) 62'	Stadium: StubHub Center; Attendance: 27,000

September 29, 2013 30	Portland Timbers	1–0	Los Angeles Galaxy	Portland, Oregon
12:30 PDT	Urruti 52'; Kah (yellow card) 74'	Report	Sarvas (yellow card) 35'	Stadium: JELD-WEN Field; Attendance: 20,674

October 6, 2013 31	Los Angeles Galaxy	5–0	Chivas USA	Carson, California
14:00 PDT	Keane 6', 90'; Donovan 23', 41'; Zardes 41'	Report		Stadium: StubHub Center; Attendance: 21,160; Referee: Jair Marrufo

October 16, 2013 32	Los Angeles Galaxy	1–0	Montreal Impact	Carson, California
19:30 PDT	Opare 68' (yellow card) 69'	Report	Warner (yellow card) 34'; Camara (yellow card) 48'; Romero (yellow card) 73'	Stadium: StubHub Center; Attendance: 13,320; Referee: Ricardo Salazar

October 20, 2013 33	Los Angeles Galaxy	0–0	San Jose Earthquakes	Carson, California
18:00 PDT	Juninho (yellow card) 70'	Report	Cronin (yellow card) 20'; Bernárdez (yellow card) 53'	Stadium: StubHub Center; Attendance: 25,418

October 27, 2013 34	Seattle Sounders FC	1–1	Los Angeles Galaxy	Seattle, Washington
18:00 PDT	Dempsey 30'	Report	Keane (yellow card) 43' (goal) 78'; Sarvas (yellow card) 60'	Stadium: CenturyLink Field; Referee: Mark Geiger

=== U.S. Open Cup ===
May 29, 2013 Third round	Carolina RailHawks	2–0	LA Galaxy	Cary, NC
				Stadium: WakeMed Soccer Park

=== CONCACAF Champions League ===
==== 2012–13 tournament ====
===== Quarterfinals =====
March 7, 2013 First leg	Herediano (Costa Rica)	0–0	(United States) Los Angeles Galaxy	Heredia, Costa Rica
19:00 PDT		Report		Stadium: Estadio Eladio Rosabal Cordero; Attendance: 4,314; Referee: Courtney Campbell (Jamaica)

March 13, 2013 Second leg	Los Angeles Galaxy (United States)	4–1 (4–1 agg.)	(Costa Rica) Herediano	Carson, United States
19:00 PDT	Gonzalez 18'; Juninho (yellow card) 43'; Villarreal 69'; Keane 83'; Franklin (yellow card) 89'; McBean 90+3'	Report	Salazar (yellow card) 71'; Ruiz (yellow card) 75'; Aguilar 85'	Stadium: The Home Depot Center; Attendance: 8,284; Referee: Walter López (Guatemala)

===== Semifinals =====
April 3, 2013 First leg	Los Angeles Galaxy (United States)	1–2	(Mexico) Monterrey	Carson, United States
19:00 PDT	DeLaGarza 28', (yellow card) 86'	Report	Mier (yellow card) 37'; Suazo 82'; Osorio (yellow card) 89' de Nigris 90', (yellow card) 90+1'	Stadium: The Home Depot Center; Attendance: 21,745; Referee: Hugo Cruz (Costa Rica)

April 10, 2013 Second leg	Monterrey (Mexico)	1–0 (3–1 agg.)	(United States) Los Angeles Galaxy	Monterrey, Mexico
19:00 PDT	de Nigris 81'	Report	McBean (yellow card) 86'	Stadium: Estadio Tecnológico; Attendance: 32,234; Referee: Roberto Moreno (Panama)

==== 2013–14 tournament ====
===== Group 8 =====
Team	Pld	W	D	L	GF	GA	GD	Pts	Qualification	LA	CAR	MET
(United States) LA Galaxy	4	3	0	1	6	4	+2	9	Advance to championship stage		2–0	1–0
(Costa Rica) Cartaginés	4	1	1	2	4	7	−3	4 (Note: Cartaginés and Isidro Metapán are ranked on head-to-head record.)		0–3		0–0
(El Salvador) Isidro Metapán	4	1	1	2	6	5	+1	4		4–0	2–4	

===== Group Stage Matches =====
August 20, 2013 1	Los Angeles Galaxy (United States)	2–0	(Costa Rica) Cartaginés	Carson, California
19:00 PDT	Keane 67', 90+3'	Report		Stadium: StubHub Center; Attendance: 9,474; Referee: Héctor Rodríguez (Honduras)

September 18, 2013 2	Los Angeles Galaxy (United States)	1–0	(El Salvador) Isidro Metapán	Carson, California
19:00 PDT	Courtois 7'; Opare (yellow card) 47'	Report	Sánchez (yellow card) 20'; Orantes (yellow card) 74'	Stadium: StubHub Center

September 25, 2013 3	Cartaginés (Costa Rica)	0–3	(United States) Los Angeles Galaxy	San José, Costa Rica
19:00 PDT	Barrantes (yellow card) 62'; Fonseca (yellow card) 77'	Report	McBean 5'; Hoffman 17'; Courtois 28'; García (yellow card) 71'	Stadium: Estadio Nacional de Costa Rica; Referee: John Pitti

October 24, 2013 4	Isidro Metapán (El Salvador)	4–0	(United States) Los Angeles Galaxy	San Salvador, El Salvador
19:00 PDT	Muñoz 29', 31', 33', 41'; Ramos (yellow card) 57'	Report	Garcia (yellow card) 18'	Stadium: Estadio Cuscatlán

=== International Champions Cup ===
August 1, 2013 1	Real Madrid (Spain)	3–1	(United States) LA Galaxy	Phoenix
19:30 MST	Di María 15'; Benzema 51', 74'		63' Villarreal	Stadium: University of Phoenix Stadium; Attendance: 38,922

August 3, 2013 2	LA Galaxy (United States)	3–1	(Italy) Juventus	Los Angeles
19:30 PDT (UTC−07:00)	Gonzalez 36'; Donovan 60'; Keane 89'		39' Matri	Stadium: Dodger Stadium; Attendance: 40,681

August 7, 2013 3	LA Galaxy (United States)	0–2	(Italy) Milan	Miami Gardens
18:30 EDT (UTC−04:00)				Stadium: Sun Life Stadium

== Transfers ==
=== In ===
No.	Pos.	Player	Transferred from	Fee/notes	Date	Ref.
36	DF	(United States) Oscar Sorto	(United States) LA Galaxy Youth Academy	Free	December 11, 2012	
29	FW	(United States) Gyasi Zardes	(United States) LA Galaxy Youth Academy	Free	December 20, 2012	
1	GK	(Italy) Carlo Cudicini	(England) Tottenham Hotspur	Free	December 31, 2012	
19	MF	(Brazil) Juninho	(Brazil) São Paulo	Undisclosed	January 16, 2013	
14	MF	(United States) Robbie Rogers	(England) Leeds United	MLS Rights Traded For	May 25, 2013	
6	MF	(United States) Pablo Mastroeni	(United States) Colorado Rapids	Traded For	June 17, 2013	
15	MF	(United States) Laurent Courtois	(United States) Chivas USA	Free	July 19, 2013	
18	GK	(Panama) Jaime Penedo	(Guatemala) C.S.D. Municipal	Free	August 5, 2013	

=== MLS Drafts ===
Pos.	Player	Transferred from	Fee/notes	Date	Ref.
MF	(United States) Colin Clark	(United States) Houston Dynamo	Stage Two MLS Re-Entry Draft, Round 1	December 14, 2012	
GK	(United States) William Hesmer	(United States) Columbus Crew	Stage Two MLS Re-Entry Draft, Round 2	December 14, 2012	
FW	(United States) Charlie Rugg	(United States) Boston College Eagles	SuperDraft, 1st round	January 17, 2013	
DF	(United States) Kofi Opare	(United States) Michigan Wolverines	SuperDraft, 2nd round	January 17, 2013	
DF	(United States) Greg Cochrane	(United States) Louisville Cardinals	SuperDraft, 2nd round	January 17, 2013	
MF	(United States) Andy Riemer	(United States) Georgetown Hoyas	Supplemental Draft, 1st round	January 22, 2013	

=== Out ===
No.	Pos.	Player	Transferred to	Fee/notes	Date	Ref.
23	MF	(England) David Beckham	(France) Paris Saint-Germain	Free	December 2, 2012	
14	FW	(United States) Edson Buddle	(United States) Colorado Rapids	Traded	December 14, 2012	
9	FW	(United States) Chad Barrett	(United States) New England Revolution	Stage Two MLS Re-Entry Draft, Round 1	December 14, 2012	
6	DF	(United States) Bryan Jordan	(United States) San Jose Earthquakes	Stage Two MLS Re-Entry Draft, Round 3	December 14, 2012	
29	DF	(New Zealand) Andrew Boyens	TBD	Free	December 14, 2012	
12	GK	(Puerto Rico) Josh Saunders	(United States) Real Salt Lake	Free	December 31, 2012	
11	FW	(United States) Pat Noonan	None	Retired	January 13, 2013	
9	MF	(Sweden) Christian Wilhelmsson	(United Arab Emirates) Baniyas SC	Free	January 13, 2013	
15	MF	(New Zealand) Dan Keat	(Sweden) Falkenbergs FF	Free	January 18, 2013	
3	DF	(Brazil) David Junior Lopes	TBD	Free	January 19, 2013	
28	MF	(United States) Kyle Nakazawa	None	Retired	January 21, 2013	
18	MF	(United States) Mike Magee	(United States) Chicago Fire	Traded	May 25, 2013	

=== Loan out ===
No.	Pos.	Player	Loaned to	Start	End	Ref.
34	MF	(United States) Kenney Walker	(United States) Ft. Lauderdale Strikers	July 26, 2013	December 31, 2013	
17	DF	(United States) Bryan Gaul	(United States) Ft. Lauderdale Strikers	July 26, 2013	December 31, 2013	
