= 2014 CONCACAF Champions League final =

- Event: 2013–14 CONCACAF Champions League
Cruz Azul	Toluca
(Mexico)	(Mexico)
1	1
- on aggregate Cruz Azul won on away goals

First leg
Cruz Azul	Toluca
0	0
- Date: 15 April 2014
- Venue: Estadio Azul, Mexico City
- Referee: Roberto García (Mexico)
- Attendance: 24,329

Second leg
Toluca	Cruz Azul
1	1
- Date: 23 April 2014
- Venue: Estadio Nemesio Díez, Toluca
- Referee: Marco Rodríguez (Mexico)
- Attendance: 20,675

The 2014 CONCACAF Champions League final was the final of the 2013–14 CONCACAF Champions League, the 6th edition of the CONCACAF Champions League under its current format, and overall the 49th edition of the premium football club competition organized by CONCACAF, the regional governing body of North America, Central America, and the Caribbean.

The final was contested in two-legged home-and-away format between two Mexican teams, Cruz Azul and Toluca. The first leg was hosted by Cruz Azul at Estadio Azul in Mexico City on 15 April 2014, while the second leg was hosted by Toluca at Estadio Nemesio Díez in Toluca on 23 April 2014. The winner earned the right to represent CONCACAF at the 2014 FIFA Club World Cup, entering at the quarterfinal stage.

The first leg ended in a 0–0 draw, and the second leg ended in a 1–1 draw, giving Cruz Azul a record-setting sixth CONCACAF club title (and their first during the Champions League era) on the away goals rule.

== Background ==
For the fifth time in six seasons of the CONCACAF Champions League, the final was played between two Mexican sides. This guaranteed a Mexican champion for the ninth straight year and 30th time since the confederation began staging the tournament in 1962 (including the tournament's predecessor, the CONCACAF Champions' Cup). Both clubs had won the CONCACAF Champions' Cup, with Cruz Azul winning five times (1969, 1970, 1971, 1996, 1997), a record they shared with América, and Toluca winning twice (1968, 2003). During the Champions League era, Cruz Azul had lost in two finals (2009, 2010), while Toluca's previous best record was reaching the semifinals.

Cruz Azul finished top of Group 3 ahead of Herediano and Valencia in the group stage, and were seeded second for the championship stage, where they eliminated Sporting Kansas City in the quarterfinals and Tijuana in the semifinals.

Toluca finished top of Group 6 ahead of Comunicaciones and Caledonia AIA in the group stage, and were seeded first for the championship stage, where they eliminated San Jose Earthquakes in the quarterfinals and Alajuelense in the semifinals.

== Road to the final ==
Note: In all results below, the score of the finalist is given first (H: home; A: away).

(Mexico) Cruz Azul				Round	(Mexico) Toluca			
Opponent	Result			Group stage	Opponent	Result		
Bye				Matchday 1	(Trinidad and Tobago) Caledonia AIA	3–1 (H)		
(Costa Rica) Herediano	3–0 (H)			Matchday 2	(Guatemala) Comunicaciones	2–1 (A)		
(Haiti) Valencia	2–1 (A)			Matchday 3	Bye			
Bye				Matchday 4	(Trinidad and Tobago) Caledonia AIA	5–1 (A)		
(Haiti) Valencia	3–0 (H)			Matchday 5	Bye			
(Costa Rica) Herediano	2–1 (A)			Matchday 6	(Guatemala) Comunicaciones	5–1 (H)		
Group 3 winner: Team / Pld / W / D / L / GF / GA / GD / Pts / Qualification; (Mexico) Cruz Azul / 4 / 4 / 0 / 0 / 10 / 2 / +8 / 12 / Advance to championship stage; (Costa Rica) Herediano / 4 / 2 / 0 / 2 / 11 / 8 / +3 / 6; (Haiti) Valencia / 4 / 0 / 0 / 4 / 4 / 15 / −11 / 0; Source:				Final standings	Group 6 winner: Team / Pld / W / D / L / GF / GA / GD / Pts / Qualification; (Mexico) Toluca / 4 / 4 / 0 / 0 / 15 / 4 / +11 / 12 / Advance to championship stage; (Guatemala) Comunicaciones / 4 / 2 / 0 / 2 / 7 / 7 / 0 / 6; (Trinidad and Tobago) Caledonia AIA / 4 / 0 / 0 / 4 / 2 / 13 / −11 / 0; Source:			
Opponent	Agg.	1st leg	2nd leg	Championship stage	Opponent	Agg.	1st leg	2nd leg
(United States) Sporting Kansas City	5–2	0–1 (A)	5–1 (H)	Quarterfinals	(United States) San Jose Earthquakes	2–2 (5–4 p)	1–1 (A)	1–1 (a.e.t.) (H)
(Mexico) Tijuana	2–1	0–1 (A)	2–0 (H)	Semifinals	(Costa Rica) Alajuelense	3–0	1–0 (A)	2–0 (H)

== Rules ==
The final was played on a home-and-away two-legged basis. The away goals rule was used if the aggregate score was level after normal time of the second leg, but not after extra time, and so the final was decided by penalty shoot-out if the aggregate score was level after extra time of the second leg.

== Matches ==
=== First leg ===
15 April 2014
19:00 UTC−5

Cruz Azul (Mexico)	0–0	(Mexico) Toluca
	Report

Estadio Azul, Mexico City
Attendance: 24,329
Referee: Roberto García (Mexico)

Cruz Azul	Toluca

GK	12	(Mexico) Guillermo Allison
DF	5	(Mexico) Alejandro Castro
DF	4	(Mexico) Julio Domínguez
DF	15	(Mexico) Gerardo Flores
DF	57	(Argentina) Emanuel Loeschbor
DF	28	(Mexico) Rogelio Chávez
MF	6	(Mexico) Gerardo Torrado (c)	(yellow card) 40'
MF	8	(Mexico) Marco Fabián
MF	33	(Argentina) Mauro Fórmica		(substituted off) 66'
FW	9	(Argentina) Mariano Pavone		(substituted off) 67'
FW	11	(Ecuador) Joao Rojas		(substituted off) 81'
Substitutions:
GK	37	(Mexico) Javier Caso
DF	55	(Mexico) David Stringel
DF	53	(Mexico) Horacio Cervantes
MF	7	(Mexico) Pablo Barrera		(substituted on) 81'
MF	10	(Mexico) Christian Giménez		(substituted on) 67'
MF	20	(Cameroon) Achille Emaná		(substituted on) 66'
MF	58	(Mexico) Héctor Gutiérrez
Manager:
(Mexico) Luis Fernando Tena

GK	1	(Mexico) Alfredo Talavera
DF	2	(Mexico) Francisco Gamboa
DF	6	(Mexico) Miguel Ponce	(yellow card) 31'
DF	8	(Mexico) Aarón Galindo
DF	4	(Paraguay) Paulo da Silva (c)
MF	5	(Brazil) Wilson Mathías
MF	15	(Mexico) Antonio Ríos	(yellow card) 71'
MF	11	(Mexico) Carlos Esquivel		(substituted off) 90+2'
MF	17	(Uruguay) Juan Manuel Salgueiro		(substituted off) 86'
FW	27	(Mexico) Isaác Brizuela	(yellow card) 84'	(substituted off) 84'
FW	7	(Paraguay) Pablo Velázquez	(yellow card) 36'
Substitutions:
GK	22	(Mexico) César Lozano
DF	20	(Mexico) Miguel Almazán
DF	14	(Mexico) Édgar Dueñas
MF	16	(Mexico) Óscar Rojas		(substituted on) 90+2'
MF	18	(Mexico) Emilio Orrantía
FW	23	(Paraguay) Édgar Benítez		(substituted on) 84'
FW	29	(Mexico) Raúl Nava		(substituted on) 86'
Manager:
(Paraguay) José Cardozo

Assistant referees:
José Luis Camargo (Mexico)
Alberto Morín (Mexico)
Fourth official:
César Ramos (Mexico)

=== Second leg ===
23 April 2014
19:00 UTC−5

Toluca (Mexico)	1–1	(Mexico) Cruz Azul
Benítez 63'	Report	Pavone 41'

Estadio Nemesio Díez, Toluca
Attendance: 20,675
Referee: Marco Rodríguez (Mexico)

Toluca	Cruz Azul

GK	1	(Mexico) Alfredo Talavera
DF	4	(Paraguay) Paulo da Silva (c)
DF	6	(Mexico) Miguel Ponce	(yellow card) 29'
DF	8	(Mexico) Aarón Galindo	(yellow card) 87'
MF	16	(Mexico) Óscar Rojas		(substituted off) 78'
MF	5	(Brazil) Wilson Mathías
MF	15	(Mexico) Antonio Ríos	(yellow card) 55'
MF	11	(Mexico) Carlos Esquivel		(substituted off) 53'
MF	17	(Uruguay) Juan Manuel Salgueiro		(substituted off) 46'
FW	27	(Mexico) Isaác Brizuela
FW	7	(Paraguay) Pablo Velázquez
Substitutions:
GK	22	(Mexico) César Lozano
DF	14	(Mexico) Édgar Dueñas
MF	2	(Mexico) Francisco Gamboa		(substituted on) 78'
MF	19	(Mexico) Edy Brambila
MF	21	(Mexico) Gabriel Velasco
FW	23	(Paraguay) Édgar Benítez		(substituted on) 53'
FW	29	(Mexico) Raúl Nava		(substituted on) 46'
Manager:
(Paraguay) José Cardozo

GK	1	(Mexico) José de Jesús Corona
DF	4	(Mexico) Julio Domínguez
DF	15	(Mexico) Gerardo Flores
DF	57	(Argentina) Emanuel Loeschbor
DF	28	(Mexico) Rogelio Chávez
MF	5	(Mexico) Alejandro Castro	(yellow card) 68'
MF	6	(Mexico) Gerardo Torrado (c)
MF	8	(Mexico) Marco Fabián		(substituted off) 89'
MF	33	(Argentina) Mauro Fórmica		(substituted off) 67'
FW	11	(Ecuador) Joao Rojas	(yellow card) 58'	(substituted off) 71'
FW	9	(Argentina) Mariano Pavone
Substitutions:
GK	12	(Mexico) Guillermo Allison
DF	14	(Colombia) Luis Amaranto Perea	(yellow card) 72'	(substituted on) 71'
DF	53	(Mexico) Horacio Cervantes		(substituted on) 89'
MF	7	(Mexico) Pablo Barrera
MF	10	(Mexico) Christian Giménez		(substituted on) 67'
MF	18	(Mexico) Sergio Nápoles
MF	70	(Mexico) Ismael Valadéz
Manager:
(Mexico) Luis Fernando Tena

Assistant referees:
Marvin Torrentera (Mexico)
Marcos Quintero (Mexico)
Fourth official:
Fernando Guerrero (Mexico)
