= Puerto Rican football clubs in North American competitions =

This is a list of Puerto Rican football clubs in North American competitions. Puerto Rican clubs have participated in competitive international football competitions since at least 2006 when the Puerto Rico Islands entered the 2006 CFU Club Championship.

Puerto Rican clubs are among the most successful Caribbean clubs. They have won two CFU Club Championships, and have reached the semifinals of the modern CONCACAF Champions League, the furthest of any Caribbean nation. The most successful team in international competition is the now-defunct Puerto Rico Islanders who have won the two CFU titles, and reached the Champions League semifinals.

== Who qualifies for CONCACAF competitions ==
Since 2018, the winner of the Liga Puerto Rico, the top tier of football on the island qualifies for the Caribbean Club Shield, a tertiary knockout tournament for developing Caribbean football nations. This competition is held in the spring. This also serves as a qualifying for the CONCACAF League, which played the fall. The CONCACAF League is the secondary association football competition for club football in North America. Should a team finish in the top six standings of the CONCACAF League, they qualify for the CONCACAF Champions League, which is played the following winter.

In order for a Puerto Rican team to reach the Champions League, they would need to win the Caribbean Club Shield and then earn a top six finish in the CONCACAF League.

== Results by competition ==
=== CONCACAF Champions League / Champions Cup ===
Year	Team	Progress	Aggregate	Opponents	Results	Ref.
1962–1983	None entered					
1984	Guayama	First round	1–2	(Guadeloupe) Moulien	0–1 home, 1–1 away	
1985–1991	None entered					
1992	Guayama	Preliminary round	w/o	(United States Virgin Islands) Rockmaster	withdrew	
2008–09	Puerto Rico Islanders	Semi-finals	3–3 (2–4 p)	(Mexico) Cruz Azul	2–0 home, 1–3 away	
2009–10	Puerto Rico Islanders	4th in group stage	—N/a	(United States) Columbus Crew, (Mexico) Cruz Azul, (Costa Rica) Saprissa		
2010–11	Puerto Rico Islanders	3rd in group stage	—N/a	(El Salvador) FAS, (Honduras) Olimpia, (Mexico) Toluca		
2011–12	Puerto Rico Islanders	Preliminary round	3–3 (a)	(El Salvador) Isidro Metapán	3–1 home, 0–2 away	
2012–13	Puerto Rico Islanders	2nd in group stage	—N/a	(El Salvador) Isidro Metapán, (United States) LA Galaxy		
2013–14	None qualified					
2014–15	Bayamón	3rd in group stage	—N/a	(Mexico) América, (Guatemala) Comunicaciones		
2015–2025	None qualified					

=== CONCACAF League ===
Year	Team	Progress	Aggregate	Opponents	Results	Ref.
2021	Metropolitan	Preliminary round	1–5	(Guatemala) Santa Lucía	1–2 home, 0–3 away	

=== CFU Club Championship ===
Year	Team	Progress	Aggregate	Opponents	Results	Ref.
2006	Puerto Rico Islanders	2nd in group stage	—N/a	(Antigua and Barbuda) Hoppers, (Guyana) Fruta Conquerors, (Trinidad and Tobago) W Connection		
2007	Puerto Rico Islanders	Third place	1–0	(Trinidad and Tobago) San Juan Jabloteh	1–0 home, 0–0 away	
2009	Puerto Rico Islanders	Final	1–2	(Trinidad and Tobago) W Connection	0–0 home, 1–2 away	
2010	Bayamón	Fourth place	—N/a	(Trinidad and Tobago) Joe Public, Puerto Rico Islanders, (Trinidad and Tobago) San Juan Jabloteh		
2010	Puerto Rico Islanders	Winners	—N/a	(Puerto Rico) Bayamón, (Trinidad and Tobago) Joe Public, (Trinidad and Tobago) San Juan Jabloteh		
2010	River Plate	Semi-final round	—N/a	(Guyana) Alpha United, (Trinidad and Tobago) San Juan Jabloteh		
2011	Puerto Rico Islanders	Winners	3–1	(Haiti) Tempête	3–1 neutral	
2011	River Plate	Quarter-finals	2–3	(Guyana) Alpha United	2–3 home, 0–0 away	
2012	Bayamón	3rd in group stage	—N/a	(Haiti) Baltimore, (Curaçao) CSD Barber, (Haiti) Victory		
2012	Puerto Rico Islanders	Third place	3–1	(Antigua and Barbuda) Antigua Barracuda	3–1 neutral	
2013	Bayamón	4th in group stage	—N/a	(Jamaica) Boys' Town, (Jamaica) Portmore United, (Haiti) Valencia		
2014	Bayamón	Semi-finals	—N/a	(Jamaica) Waterhouse	Cancelled	
2015–2016	None entered					
2017	Puerto Rico FC	2nd in group stage	—N/a	(Jamaica) Portmore United, (Cayman Islands) Scholars International, (Suriname) Transvaal		
2021	Metropolitan	Semi-finals	1–3	(Suriname) Inter Moengotapoe	1–3 neutral	

=== CFU Club Shield ===
Year	Team	Progress	Aggregate	Opponents	Results	Ref.
2018–2019	None entered					
2020	Metropolitan	Cancelled due to the COVID-19 pandemic				
2021	Metropolitan	Cancelled due to the COVID-19 pandemic				
2022	Bayamón	Winners	2–1	(Suriname) Inter Moengotapoe	2–1 (a.e.t.) neutral	
2023	Metropolitan	4th place	1–6	(Trinidad and Tobago) Club Sando	1–6 neutral	
2024	Metropolitan	Quarter-finals	0–1	(Dominican Republic) Atlético Pantoja	0–1 neutral	
2025	Academia Quintana	2nd in group stage	—N/a	(Bonaire) Real Rincon, (United States Virgin Islands) Rovers		
2026	Metropolitan	Semi-finals	0–0 (9–10 p)	(Dominican Republic) Delfines del Este	0–0 (9–10 p) neutral	

== Appearances in CONCACAF competitions ==
As of December 23, 2019

Club	Total						CCL	CCC	CCS	CWC	First Appearance	Last Appearance
Club	Apps	Pld	W	D	L	Win%	CCL	CCC	CCS	CWC	First Appearance	Last Appearance
Bayamón	5	19	5	3	11	.342	1	4	0	0	2010 CFU Club Championship	2014–15 CONCACAF Champions League
Guayama	2	4	0	1	3	.563	2	0	0	0	1984 CONCACAF Champions Cup	1992 CONCACAF Champions Cup
Metropolitan	2	3	2	1	0	.833	0	0	2	0	2020 CFU Club Shield	2021 CONCACAF League
Puerto Rico FC	1	3	2	0	1	.667	0	1	0	0	2017 CFU Club Championship	2017 CFU Club Championship
Puerto Rico Islanders	11	61	31	14	16	.623	5	6	0	0	2006 CFU Club Championship	2012–13 CONCACAF Champions League
River Plate	2	9	4	2	3	.556	0	2	0	0	2010 CFU Club Championship	2011 CFU Club Championship
