= Luis Trujillo =

Luis Trujillo may refer to:

- Luis Trujillo (Peruvian footballer) (born 1990), Peruvian football left-back
- Luis Trujillo (Mexican footballer) (born 1993), Mexican football defender
