= Kofi Opare =

Ghanaian footballer (born 1990)

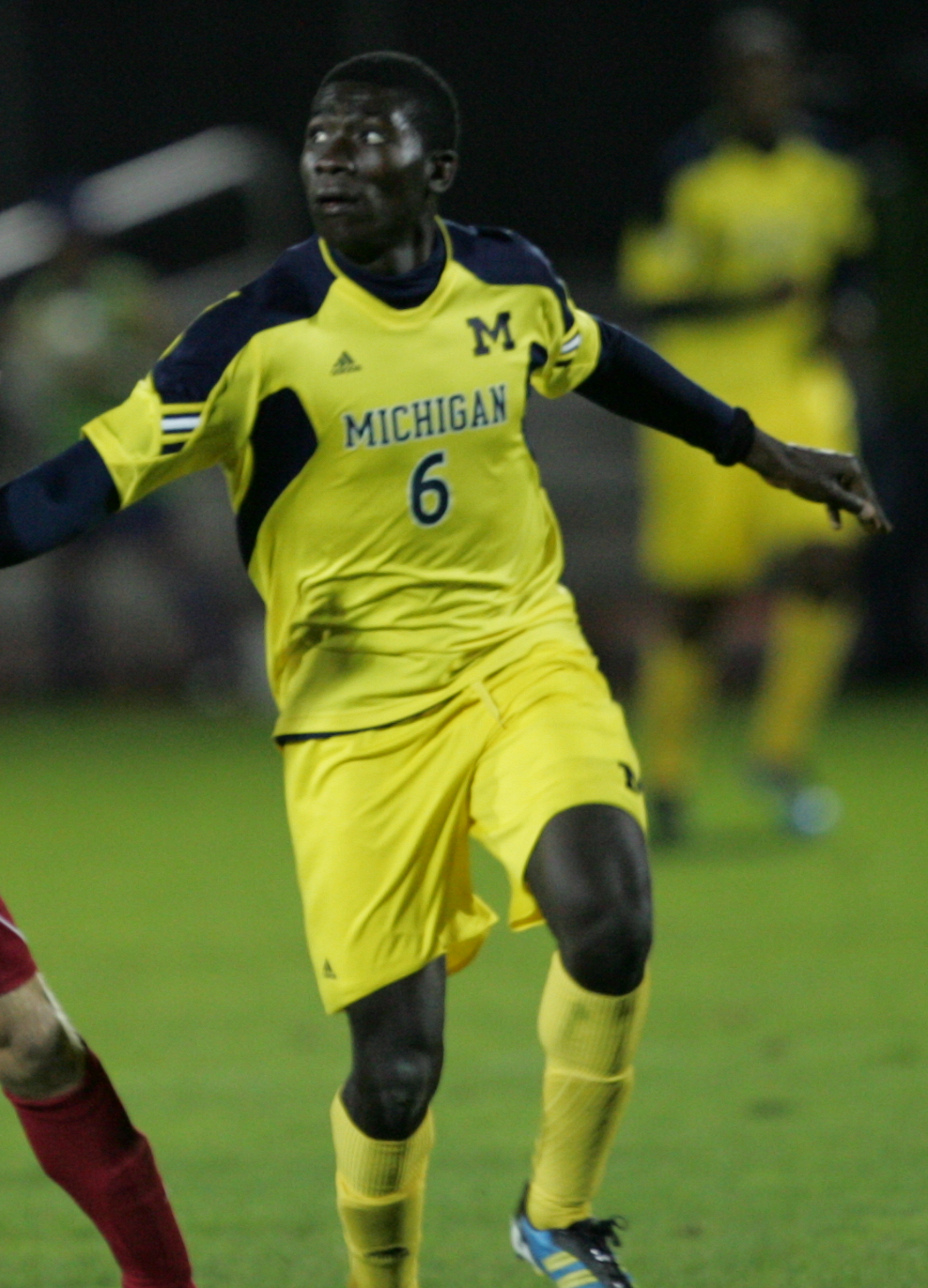
- Opare with Michigan in 2011

Personal information
- Date of birth: October 12, 1990 (age 36)
- Place of birth: Mampong, Ashanti, Ghana
- Height: 1.88 m (6 ft 2 in)
- Position: Defender

Youth career
- 2007–2008: St. Catharine's Concord Gunners

College career
Years	Team	Apps	(Gls)
2009–2012	Michigan Wolverines	76	(6)

Senior career*
Years	Team	Apps	(Gls)
2010–2012	Michigan Bucks	6	(0)
2012	Detroit City	4	(0)
2013–2014	LA Galaxy	12	(1)
2014	→ LA Galaxy II (loan)	5	(0)
2014–2018	D.C. United	65	(3)
2019	Colorado Rapids	3	(0)
2019	→ Colorado Springs Switchbacks (loan)	2	(0)
- * Club domestic league appearances and goals as of 20 April 2019

Kofi Opare (born October 12, 1990) is a Ghanaian professional footballer who plays as a defender. He has previously appeared for Michigan Bucks, Detroit City, LA Galaxy, D.C. United, and Colorado Rapids.

== Early life ==
Opare was born on October 12, 1990, in Mampong, Ghana. His family lived in Pretoria, South Africa and Newark, New Jersey, United States before settling in Niagara Falls, Ontario, Canada.

== Career ==
=== College and amateur ===
After spending his youth career with St. Catharines Concord Gunners, Opare committed to the University of Michigan on March 4, 2009, where he would spend all four years of his college career. In his freshman year with the Wolverines, Opare made 14 appearances and scored his first collegiate goal on September 11 in a 3–0 victory over Wright State. He also went on to be named to the Big Ten All-Freshman team. In 2010, he made 25 appearances and helped lead Michigan to the College Cup semi-final where they would fall 2–1 to the eventual champion Akron Zips. In 2011, Opare started all 20 games for the Wolverines and finished the year with two goals and one assist and was also named All-Big Ten Second Team. In his final season with Michigan, Opare made 17 appearances and finished the year with three goals.

During his time in college, Opare also played for Michigan Bucks in the USL Premier Development League and for Detroit City in the National Premier Soccer League.

=== Professional ===
On January 17, 2013, Opare was selected in the second round (24th overall) of the 2013 MLS SuperDraft by Los Angeles Galaxy. He signed his first professional contract with the club on March 11. On August 20, Opare made his professional debut for the club in a 2–0 victory over Costa Rican side Cartaginés in the CONCACAF Champions League.

Opare was traded to D.C. United in July 2014 with a second-round pick in the 2015 MLS SuperDraft in exchange for a swap in places in the MLS allocation order. He scored his first goal for United on May 13, 2015, against Orlando City. Opare stayed with D.C. through the 2018 season, at which time the club declined his 2019 contract option.

On February 25, 2019, Opare joined Colorado Rapids. His contract option was declined by the Rapids for the 2020 season.

=== International ===
Opare was called up to a training camp in Trinidad and Tobago with the U.S. U-20 national team by Thomas Rongen in January 2009 ahead of the 2009 CONCACAF U-20 Championship. During the camp, the U.S. played against the Trinidad U-17 team.

However, the then 18-year-old Opare was not called up to CONCACAF U-20 Championship roster as he was not eligible to play. In May 2008 FIFA had updated their regulations with immediate effect and required that players reside "continuously for at least five years after reaching the age of 18 on the territory of the relevant Association" to become eligible to play for a national team in a competitive game. It was a measure put in place by FIFA to prevent countries offering citizenship to talented footballers and allowing them to play for the national team immediately despite not having any ties to the country.

The change in regulations meant that despite living in Ontario for four years as a teenager, Opare would not be eligible to represent Canada irrespective of holding citizenship unless he lives there for five years after the age of 18, Opare could however represent U.S. in competitive football as he meets those requirements for the U.S. Opare is also eligible to play for Ghana, the nation where he was born.

== Personal ==
Opare holds both U.S. and Canadian citizenship.

== Career statistics ==
As of April 20, 2019

Club	Season	League			Cup		Continental		Other		Total	
Club	Season	Division	Apps	Goals	Apps	Goals	Apps	Goals	Apps	Goals	Apps	Goals
Michigan Bucks	2010	PDL	1	0	–		–		0	0	1	0
Michigan Bucks	2011	PDL	4	0	–		–		1 (Note: Appearance in the PDL playoffs)	0	5	0
Michigan Bucks	2012	PDL	1	0			–		0	0	1+	0+
Michigan Bucks	Total		6	0	0+	0+	0	0	1	0	7+	0+
Detroit City	2012	NPSL	4	0	–		–		0	0	4	0
LA Galaxy	2013	MLS	6	1	0	0	2 (Note: Appearances in the CONCACAF Champions League)	0	2 (Note: Appearances in the MLS Cup Playoffs)	0	10	1
LA Galaxy	2014	MLS	6	0	1	0	0	0	0	0	7	0
LA Galaxy	Total		12	1	1	0	2	0	2	0	17	1
LA Galaxy II (loan)	2014	USL Pro	5	0	0	0	–		0	0	5	0
D.C. United	2014	MLS	0	0	0	0	4	0	0	0	4	0
D.C. United	2015	MLS	18	1	2	1	4	2	2	0	26	4
D.C. United	2016	MLS	10	0	1	0	0	0	0	0	11	0
D.C. United	2017	MLS	26	2	1	0	–		–		27	2
D.C. United	2018	MLS	11	0	0	0	–		0	0	11	0
D.C. United	Total		65	3	4	1	8	2	2	0	79	6
Colorado Rapids	2019	MLS	3	0	0	0	–		0	0	3	0
Colorado Springs Switchbacks (loan)	2019	USL Championship	2	0	0	0	–		–		2	0
Career total			97	4	5	1	10	2	5	0	117+	7+
