= 2013 CFU Club Championship =

2013 CFU Club Champions’ Cup

Tournament details
- Dates: April 26 – May 22, 2013
- Teams: 7 (from 5 associations)

Tournament statistics
- Matches played: 11
- Goals scored: 32 (2.91 per match)
- Attendance: 5,233 (476 per match)
- Top scorer(s): (Haiti) Augustin Walson (Jamaica) Ricardo Morris (3 goals)

The 2013 CFU Club Championship was the 15th edition of CFU Club Championship, the annual international club football competition in the Caribbean region, held amongst clubs whose football associations are affiliated with the Caribbean Football Union (CFU). The top three teams in the tournament qualified for the 2013–14 CONCACAF Champions League.

== Participating teams ==
A total of seven teams from five CFU associations took part in the competition.

Association	Team	Qualification method
Antigua and Barbuda	Antigua Barracuda	USL Pro team (only professional team based in country)
Haiti	Valencia	2012 Ligue Haïtienne champion
Jamaica	Portmore United	2011–12 National Premier League champion
Jamaica	Boys' Town	2011–12 National Premier League runner-up
Puerto Rico	Bayamón FC	2012 Liga Nacional de Fútbol de Puerto Rico champion
Trinidad and Tobago	W Connection	2011–12 TT Pro League champion
Trinidad and Tobago	Caledonia AIA	2011–12 TT Pro League third place

- Baltimore (Haiti) was supposed to take part and was drawn into Group 1, but withdrew before the competition started.
- Inter Moengotapoe (Suriname) was supposed to take part and was drawn into Group 2, but withdrew before the competition started. Portmore United (Jamaica) took their spot.

== First round ==
The seven teams were divided into one group of three teams and one group of four teams. Each group was played on a round-robin basis at a centralized venue. The winners from each group qualified directly to the 2013–14 CONCACAF Champions League, while the runners-up advanced to the playoff round to determine the third entrant to the 2013–14 CONCACAF Champions League.

Key to colours in group tables
Group winners qualified directly to the 2013–14 CONCACAF Champions League
Group runners-up advanced to the playoff round

=== Group 1 ===
- Hosted by W Connection at Ato Boldon Stadium in Couva, Trinidad and Tobago (all times UTC−4).

Team	Pld	W	D	L	GF	GA	GD	Pts
(Trinidad and Tobago) W Connection	2	1	1	0	4	0	+4	4
(Trinidad and Tobago) Caledonia AIA	2	1	0	1	3	5	−2	3
(Antigua and Barbuda) Antigua Barracuda	2	0	1	1	1	3	−2	1

April 26, 2013
18:00

W Connection (Trinidad and Tobago)	4–0	(Trinidad and Tobago) Caledonia AIA
Jones 6', 81'; Pacheco 27'; Rijssel 89'	Report

Ato Boldon Stadium, Couva
Attendance: 70
Referee: Raymond Bogle (Jamaica)

April 28, 2013
17:00

Caledonia AIA (Trinidad and Tobago)	3–1	(Antigua and Barbuda) Antigua Barracuda
Gay 21'; Theobald 34'; Edwards 90'	Report	Manders 88'

Ato Boldon Stadium, Couva
Attendance: 40
Referee: Kimbett Ward (Saint Kitts and Nevis)

April 30, 2013
18:00

W Connection (Trinidad and Tobago)	0–0	(Antigua and Barbuda) Antigua Barracuda
	Report

Ato Boldon Stadium, Couva
Attendance: 86
Referee: Johannes Dolaini (Suriname)

=== Group 2 ===
- Hosted by Boys' Town at Anthony Spaulding Sports Complex in Kingston, Jamaica (all times UTC−5).

Team	Pld	W	D	L	GF	GA	GD	Pts
(Haiti) Valencia	3	2	1	0	7	4	+3	7
(Jamaica) Portmore United	3	2	0	1	9	4	+5	6
(Jamaica) Boys' Town	3	1	1	1	2	1	+1	4
(Puerto Rico) Bayamón FC	3	0	0	3	1	10	−9	0

April 26, 2013
18:00

Bayamón FC (Puerto Rico)	1–3	(Haiti) Valencia
Martin 9'	Report	Walson 22'; Pompée 29'; Amy 85'

Anthony Spaulding Sports Complex, Kingston
Attendance: 200
Referee: Valdin Legister (Jamaica)
April 26, 2013
20:00

Portmore United (Jamaica)	1–0	(Jamaica) Boys' Town
Morris 83'	Report

Anthony Spaulding Sports Complex, Kingston
Attendance: 1,500
Referee: Stanley Lancaster (Guyana)

April 28, 2013
18:00

Portmore United (Jamaica)	3–4	(Haiti) Valencia
McCalla 69'; Reid 81'; Morris 90+4'	Report	Walson 6', 34'; Jean 24'; R. Joseph 83'

Anthony Spaulding Sports Complex, Kingston
Attendance: 1,700
Referee: Rodphin Harris (Trinidad and Tobago)
April 28, 2013
20:00

Boys' Town (Jamaica)	2–0	(Puerto Rico) Bayamón FC
Stewart 33' (pen.), 55'	Report

Anthony Spaulding Sports Complex, Kingston
Attendance: 500
Referee: Bryan Willett (Antigua and Barbuda)

April 30, 2013
18:00

Portmore United (Jamaica)	5–0	(Puerto Rico) Bayamón FC
McCalla 45'; Morris 50'; Wilson 81', 90+2'; Pryce 84'	Report

Anthony Spaulding Sports Complex, Kingston
Attendance: 400
Referee: Stanley Lancaster (Guyana)
April 30, 2013
20:00

Boys' Town (Jamaica)	0–0	(Haiti) Valencia
	Report

Anthony Spaulding Sports Complex, Kingston
Attendance: 400
Referee: Bryan Willett (Antigua and Barbuda)

== Playoff round ==
The playoff between the two group runners-up was played on two-legged basis, with both matches held in Trinidad and Tobago (all times UTC−4).

May 20, 2013
18:00

Portmore United (Jamaica)	0–1	(Trinidad and Tobago) Caledonia AIA
	Report	Gay 27'

Hasely Crawford Stadium, Port of Spain
Attendance: 187
Referee: Leo Clarke (Saint Lucia)

May 22, 2013
18:00

Caledonia AIA (Trinidad and Tobago)	2–2	(Jamaica) Portmore United
Lewis 13'; Edwards 68'	Report	Williams 61'; Vanzie 74'

Ato Boldon Stadium, Couva
Attendance: 150
Referee: Marcos Brea (Cuba)

Caledonia AIA won 3–2 on aggregate and qualified for the 2013–14 CONCACAF Champions League.

== Goalscorers ==
Rank	Player	Team	Goals
1	(Haiti) Augustin Walson	(Haiti) Valencia	3
1	(Jamaica) Ricardo Morris	(Jamaica) Portmore United	3
3	(Jamaica) Marvin Stewart	(Jamaica) Boys' Town	2
3	(Jamaica) Sue-Lae McCalla	(Jamaica) Portmore United	2
3	(Jamaica) Paul Wilson	(Jamaica) Portmore United	2
3	(Trinidad and Tobago) Keyon Edwards	(Trinidad and Tobago) Caledonia AIA	2
3	(Trinidad and Tobago) Jamal Gay	(Trinidad and Tobago) Caledonia AIA	2
3	(Trinidad and Tobago) Joevin Jones	(Trinidad and Tobago) W Connection	2
9	(Bermuda) Taurean Manders	(Antigua and Barbuda) Antigua Barracuda	1
9	(Haiti) André Amy	(Haiti) Valencia	1
9	(Haiti) Jean-Robert Jean	(Haiti) Valencia	1
9	(Haiti) Samuel Pompée	(Haiti) Valencia	1
9	(Haiti) Roody Joseph	(Haiti) Valencia	1
9	(Jamaica) Cleon Pryce	(Jamaica) Portmore United	1
9	(Jamaica) Adrian Reid	(Jamaica) Portmore United	1
9	(Jamaica) Andrew Vanzie	(Jamaica) Portmore United	1
9	(Jamaica) Stephen Williams	(Jamaica) Portmore United	1
9	(Puerto Rico) Carlos Martin	(Puerto Rico) Bayamón FC	1
9	(Trinidad and Tobago) Nathan Lewis	(Trinidad and Tobago) Caledonia AIA	1
9	(Trinidad and Tobago) Densill Theobald	(Trinidad and Tobago) Caledonia AIA	1
9	(Trinidad and Tobago) Andrei Pacheco	(Trinidad and Tobago) W Connection	1
9	(Suriname) Stefano Rijssel	(Trinidad and Tobago) W Connection	1
