= 2013–14 CONCACAF Champions League championship stage =

The championship stage of the 2013–14 CONCACAF Champions League was played from March 10 to April 24, 2014. A total of eight teams competed in the championship stage.

== Qualified teams ==
The winners of each of the eight groups in the group stage qualified for the championship stage.

Group	Winners
1	(Panama) Árabe Unido
2	(United States) Sporting Kansas City
3	(Mexico) Cruz Azul
4	(Costa Rica) Alajuelense
5	(United States) San Jose Earthquakes
6	(Mexico) Toluca
7	(Mexico) Tijuana
8	(United States) LA Galaxy

== Seeding ==
The qualified teams were seeded 1–8 in the championship stage according to their results in the group stage.

Seed	Team	Pld	W	D	L	GF	GA	GD	Pts
1	(Mexico) Toluca	4	4	0	0	15	4	+11	12
2	(Mexico) Cruz Azul	4	4	0	0	10	2	+8	12
3	(Mexico) Tijuana	4	3	1	0	10	2	+8	10
4	(Panama) Árabe Unido	4	3	0	1	7	3	+4	9
5	(Costa Rica) Alajuelense	4	3	0	1	4	1	+3	9
6	(United States) LA Galaxy	4	3	0	1	6	4	+2	9
7	(United States) Sporting Kansas City	4	2	2	0	5	1	+4	8
8	(United States) San Jose Earthquakes	4	2	0	2	4	2	+2	6

Rules for classification: 1. Points; 2. Goal difference; 3. Goals scored; 4. Away goals scored; 5. Wins; 6. Away wins; 7. Drawing of lots.

== Format ==
In the championship stage, the eight teams played a single-elimination tournament. Each tie was played on a home-and-away two-legged basis. The away goals rule was used if the aggregate score was level after normal time of the second leg, but not after extra time, and so a tie was decided by penalty shoot-out if the aggregate score was level after extra time of the second leg.

== Bracket ==
The bracket of the championship stage was determined by the seeding as follows:

- Quarterfinals: Seed 1 vs. Seed 8 (QF1), Seed 2 vs. Seed 7 (QF2), Seed 3 vs. Seed 6 (QF3), Seed 4 vs. Seed 5 (QF4), with seeds 1–4 hosting the second leg
- Semifinals: Winner QF1 vs. Winner QF4 (SF1), Winner QF2 vs. Winner QF3 (SF2), with winners QF1 and QF2 hosting the second leg
- Finals: Winner SF1 vs. Winner SF2, with winner SF1 hosting the second leg

Quarterfinals
6	(United States) LA Galaxy	1	2	3
3	(Mexico) Tijuana	0	4	4
7	(United States) Sporting Kansas City	1	1	2
2	(Mexico) Cruz Azul	0	5	5
5	(Costa Rica) Alajuelense	0	2	2
4	(Panama) Árabe Unido	0	0	0
8	(United States) San Jose Earthquakes	1	1	2 (4)
1	(Mexico) Toluca (p)	1	1	2 (5)

Semifinals
3	(Mexico) Tijuana	1	0	1
2	(Mexico) Cruz Azul	0	2	2
5	(Costa Rica) Alajuelense	0	0	0
1	(Mexico) Toluca	1	2	3

Finals
2	(Mexico) Cruz Azul (a)	0	1	1
1	(Mexico) Toluca	0	1	1

== Quarterfinals ==
The first legs were played on March 10–12, 2014, and the second legs were played on March 18–20, 2014.

All times U.S. Eastern Daylight Time (UTC−4)

Team 1	Agg.	Team 2	1st leg	2nd leg
San Jose Earthquakes (United States)	2–2 (4–5 p)	(Mexico) Toluca	1–1	1–1 (a.e.t.)
Sporting Kansas City (United States)	2–5	(Mexico) Cruz Azul	1–0	1–5
LA Galaxy (United States)	3–4	(Mexico) Tijuana	1–0	2–4
Alajuelense (Costa Rica)	2–0	(Panama) Árabe Unido	0–0	2–0

=== First leg ===
March 10, 2014
22:00

Alajuelense (Costa Rica)	0–0	(Panama) Árabe Unido
	Report

Estadio Alejandro Morera Soto, Alajuela
Referee: Roberto García (Mexico)

March 11, 2014
22:00

San Jose Earthquakes (United States)	1–1	(Mexico) Toluca
Gordon 90+5'	Report	Nava 67'

Buck Shaw Stadium, Santa Clara
Attendance: 10,525
Referee: Wálter Quesada (Costa Rica)

March 12, 2014
20:00

Sporting Kansas City (United States)	1–0	(Mexico) Cruz Azul
Ellis 17'	Report

Sporting Park, Kansas City
Attendance: 18,467
Referee: Elmer Bonilla (El Salvador)

March 12, 2014
22:00

LA Galaxy (United States)	1–0	(Mexico) Tijuana
Samuel 11'	Report

StubHub Center, Carson
Attendance: 15,159
Referee: Enrico Wijngaarde (Suriname)

=== Second leg ===
March 18, 2014
22:00

Tijuana (Mexico)	4–2	(United States) LA Galaxy
Ayoví 2', 9'; Benedetto 26'; Ruiz 82'	Report	Keane 47', 84'

Estadio Caliente, Tijuana
Attendance: 19,333
Referee: Roberto Moreno (Panama)

Tijuana won 4–3 on aggregate.

March 19, 2014
20:00

Toluca (Mexico)	1–1 (a.e.t.)	(United States) San Jose Earthquakes
Brizuela 69'	Report	Harden 56'
Penalties
Nava (penalty missed); Ríos (penalty scored); Velázquez (penalty scored); Ponce (penalty scored); Talavera (penalty scored); Wilson Mathías (penalty scored)	5–4	(penalty missed) Wondolowski; (penalty scored) Gordon; (penalty scored) Cronin; (penalty scored) Schuler; (penalty scored) Koval; (penalty missed) Salinas

Estadio Nemesio Díez, Toluca
Attendance: 11,844
Referee: Héctor Rodríguez (Honduras)

2–2 on aggregate. Toluca won 5–4 on penalties.

March 19, 2014
22:00

Cruz Azul (Mexico)	5–1	(United States) Sporting Kansas City
Pavone 2', 23', 55'; Formica 65'; Giménez 70'	Report	Feilhaber 43'

Estadio Azul, Mexico City
Referee: Walter López (Guatemala)

Cruz Azul won 5–2 on aggregate.

March 20, 2014
22:00

Árabe Unido (Panama)	0–2	(Costa Rica) Alajuelense
	Report	Palacios 6'; McDonald 58'

Estadio Rommel Fernández, Panama City
Referee: Joel Aguilar (El Salvador)

Alajuelense won 2–0 on aggregate.

== Semifinals ==
The first legs were played on April 1, 2014, and the second legs were played on April 8–9, 2014.

All times U.S. Eastern Daylight Time (UTC−4)

Team 1	Agg.	Team 2	1st leg	2nd leg
Alajuelense (Costa Rica)	0–3	(Mexico) Toluca	0–1	0–2
Tijuana (Mexico)	1–2	(Mexico) Cruz Azul	1–0	0–2

=== First leg ===
April 1, 2014
20:00

Alajuelense (Costa Rica)	0–1	(Mexico) Toluca
	Report	Da Silva 71'

Estadio Alejandro Morera Soto, Alajuela
Attendance: 16,573
Referee: Mark Geiger (United States)

April 1, 2014
22:00

Tijuana (Mexico)	1–0	(Mexico) Cruz Azul
Pellerano 78' (pen.)	Report

Estadio Caliente, Tijuana
Attendance: 22,333
Referee: Francisco Chacón (Mexico)

=== Second leg ===
April 8, 2014
20:00

Toluca (Mexico)	2–0	(Costa Rica) Alajuelense
Esquivel 35'; Salgueiro 62'	Report

Estadio Nemesio Díez, Toluca
Attendance: 16,672
Referee: Enrico Wijngaarde (Suriname)

Toluca won 3–0 on aggregate.

April 9, 2014
20:00

Cruz Azul (Mexico)	2–0	(Mexico) Tijuana
Güemez 3' (o.g.); Domínguez 51'	Report

Estadio Azul, Mexico City
Attendance: 26,603
Referee: Paul Delgadillo (Mexico)

Cruz Azul won 2–1 on aggregate.

== Finals ==
The first leg was played on April 15, 2014, and the second leg was played on April 23, 2014.

All times U.S. Eastern Daylight Time (UTC−4)

Team 1	Agg.	Team 2	1st leg	2nd leg
Cruz Azul (Mexico)	1–1 (a)	(Mexico) Toluca	0–0	1–1

=== First leg ===
April 15, 2014
20:00

Cruz Azul (Mexico)	0–0	(Mexico) Toluca
	Report

Estadio Azul, Mexico City
Attendance: 30,203
Referee: Roberto García (Mexico)

=== Second leg ===
April 23, 2014
20:00

Toluca (Mexico)	1–1	(Mexico) Cruz Azul
Benítez 63'	Report	Pavone 41'

Estadio Nemesio Díez, Toluca
Attendance: 25,000
Referee: Marco Rodríguez (Mexico)

1–1 on aggregate. Cruz Azul won on away goals.
