= Geteau Ferdinand =

Haitian footballer (born 1974)

Personal information
- Date of birth: 19 May 1974 (age 52)
- Position: Goalkeeper

Senior career*
| Years | Team | Apps | (Gls) |
| 1999–2011 | Valencia | | |

International career
| 1999–2002 | Haiti | 19 | (0) |
- * Club domestic league appearances and goals

Geteau Ferdinand (born 19 May 1974) is a Haitian former professional footballer who played as a goalkeeper for Valencia and the Haiti national team.
