= 2013–14 CONCACAF Champions League group stage =

The group stage of the 2013–14 CONCACAF Champions League was played from August 6 to October 24, 2013. A total of 24 teams competed in the group stage.

== Draw ==
The draw for the group stage was held on June 3, 2013, 20:00 EDT (UTC−4), at the InterContinental Hotel at Doral in Miami.

The 24 teams were drawn into eight groups of three, with each group containing one team from each of the three pots. The allocation of teams into pots was based on their national association and qualifying berth. Teams from the same association (excluding "wildcard" teams which replace a team from another association) could not be drawn with each other in the group stage, and each group was guaranteed to contain a team from either the United States or Mexico, meaning U.S. and Mexican teams could not play each other in the group stage.

== Seeding ==
The following were the group stage seeding of the 24 teams which qualified for the Champions League:

Pot A
(Mexico) Tijuana	(Mexico) América	(United States) LA Galaxy	(United States) San Jose Earthquakes
(Costa Rica) Herediano	(Honduras) Olimpia	(Guatemala) Comunicaciones	(Panama) Árabe Unido
Pot B
(Mexico) Toluca	(Mexico) Cruz Azul	(United States) Houston Dynamo	(United States) Sporting Kansas City
(Costa Rica) Alajuelense	(Honduras) Victoria	(El Salvador) Isidro Metapán	(Canada) Montreal Impact
Pot C
(Guatemala) Heredia	(El Salvador) Luis Ángel Firpo	(Panama) Sporting San Miguelito	(Nicaragua) Real Estelí
(Costa Rica) Cartaginés	(Trinidad and Tobago) W Connection	(Haiti) Valencia	(Trinidad and Tobago) Caledonia AIA

== Format ==
In the group stage, each group was played on a home-and-away round-robin basis. The winners of each group advanced to the championship stage.

=== Tiebreakers ===
In each group, teams are ranked according to points (3 points for a win, 1 point for a draw, 0 points for a loss). If tied on points, tiebreakers are applied in the following order:

1. Greater number of points earned in matches between the teams concerned
2. Greater goal difference in matches between the teams concerned
3. Greater number of goals scored away from home in matches between the teams concerned
4. Reapply first three criteria if two or more teams are still tied
5. Greater goal difference in all group matches
6. Greater number of goals scored in group matches
7. Greater number of goals scored away in all group matches
8. Drawing of lots

== Groups ==
The matchdays were August 6–8, August 20–22, August 27–29, September 17–19, September 24–26, and October 22–24, 2013.

All times U.S. Eastern Daylight Time (UTC−4)

=== Group 1 ===
Team	Pld	W	D	L	GF	GA	GD	Pts	Qualification	ARA	HOU	WCO
(Panama) Árabe Unido	4	3	0	1	7	3	+4	9	Advance to championship stage		1–0	3–1
(United States) Houston Dynamo	4	2	1	1	4	2	+2	7		2–1		2–0
(Trinidad and Tobago) W Connection	4	0	1	3	1	7	−6	1		0–2	0–0	

August 8, 2013
22:00

Árabe Unido (Panama)	3–1	(Trinidad and Tobago) W Connection
Ward 21', 33'; González 53'	Report	Benjamin 76'

Estadio Rommel Fernández, Panama City
Attendance: 1,000
Referee: Sandy Vásquez (Dominican Republic)

August 20, 2013
20:00

W Connection (Trinidad and Tobago)	0–0	(United States) Houston Dynamo
	Report

Hasely Crawford Stadium, Port of Spain
Attendance: 1,500
Referee: Marco Rodríguez (Mexico)

August 27, 2013
20:00

Houston Dynamo (United States)	2–1	(Panama) Árabe Unido
Weaver 23', 76'	Report	Arroyo 8' (pen.)

BBVA Compass Stadium, Houston
Attendance: 12,694
Referee: Hugo Cruz (Costa Rica)

September 19, 2013
20:00

W Connection (Trinidad and Tobago)	0–2	(Panama) Árabe Unido
	Report	Fraiz 28'; Arroyo 61'

Hasely Crawford Stadium, Port of Spain
Attendance: 1,000
Referee: Trevor Taylor (Barbados)

September 25, 2013
20:00

Houston Dynamo (United States)	2–0	(Trinidad and Tobago) W Connection
Johnson 39'; Boswell 52'	Report

BBVA Compass Stadium, Houston
Attendance: 11,933
Referee: Ricardo Montero (Costa Rica)

October 24, 2013
20:00

Árabe Unido (Panama)	1–0	(United States) Houston Dynamo
González 61'	Report

Estadio Agustín Sánchez, La Chorrera
Referee: Courtney Campbell (Jamaica)

=== Group 2 ===
Team	Pld	W	D	L	GF	GA	GD	Pts	Qualification	KC	OLI	EST
(United States) Sporting Kansas City	4	2	2	0	5	1	+4	8	Advance to championship stage		0–0	1–1
(Honduras) Olimpia	4	2	1	1	2	2	0	7		0–2		1–0
(Nicaragua) Real Estelí	4	0	1	3	1	5	−4	1		0–2	0–1	

August 7, 2013
22:00

Real Estelí (Nicaragua)	0–2	(United States) Sporting Kansas City
	Report	Opara 33'; Dwyer 76'

Estadio Independencia, Estelí
Referee: Jafeth Perea (Panama)

August 21, 2013
22:00

Real Estelí (Nicaragua)	0–1	(Honduras) Olimpia
	Report	Méndez 47'

Estadio Independencia, Estelí
Attendance: 4,800
Referee: Ricardo Montero (Costa Rica)

August 27, 2013
22:00

Olimpia (Honduras)	0–2	(United States) Sporting Kansas City
	Report	Saad 27', 68' (pen.)

Estadio Tiburcio Carías Andino, Tegucigalpa
Referee: Henry Bejarano (Costa Rica)

September 17, 2013
20:00

Sporting Kansas City (United States)	1–1	(Nicaragua) Real Estelí
Peterson 78'	Report	Calero 54'

Sporting Park, Kansas City
Attendance: 18,467
Referee: Sandy Vásquez (Dominican Republic)

September 24, 2013
22:00

Olimpia (Honduras)	1–0	(Nicaragua) Real Estelí
Lozano 67'	Report

Estadio Tiburcio Carías Andino, Tegucigalpa
Referee: William Anderson (Puerto Rico)

October 23, 2013
20:00

Sporting Kansas City (United States)	0–0	(Honduras) Olimpia
	Report

Sporting Park, Kansas City
Attendance: 18,467
Referee: Joel Aguilar (El Salvador)

=== Group 3 ===
Team	Pld	W	D	L	GF	GA	GD	Pts	Qualification	CA	HER	VAL
(Mexico) Cruz Azul	4	4	0	0	10	2	+8	12	Advance to championship stage		3–0	3–0
(Costa Rica) Herediano	4	2	0	2	11	8	+3	6		1–2		4–2
(Haiti) Valencia	4	0	0	4	4	15	−11	0		1–2	1–6	

August 8, 2013
20:00

Valencia (Haiti)	1–6	(Costa Rica) Herediano
R. Joseph 68'	Report	Gómez 39'; Ruiz 45'; Nuñez 55'; Sánchez 71'; Porras 81'; Duverger 85' (o.g.)

Stade Sylvio Cator, Port-au-Prince
Referee: William Anderson (Puerto Rico)

August 22, 2013
20:00

Cruz Azul (Mexico)	3–0	(Costa Rica) Herediano
Pereira 32'; Pavone 42'; Torrado 45+1'	Report

Estadio Azul, Mexico City
Attendance: 3,000
Referee: Armando Castro (Honduras)

August 28, 2013
20:00

Valencia (Haiti)	1–2	(Mexico) Cruz Azul
Amy 72'	Report	Amione 17'; Lara 86'

Stade Sylvio Cator, Port-au-Prince
Attendance: 3,000
Referee: Óscar Dávila (Nicaragua)

September 18, 2013
22:00

Herediano (Costa Rica)	4–2	(Haiti) Valencia
Vargas 1'; Díaz 7'; Sánchez 52'; Porras 77'	Report	R. Joseph 50'; Amy 85'

Estadio Alejandro Morera Soto, Alajuela
Attendance: 2,000
Referee: Erick Andino (Honduras)

September 24, 2013
20:00

Cruz Azul (Mexico)	3–0	(Haiti) Valencia
Emaná 6', 31', 75'	Report

Estadio Azul, Mexico City
Referee: Jeffrey Solís (Costa Rica)

October 22, 2013
22:00

Herediano (Costa Rica)	1–2	(Mexico) Cruz Azul
Porras 56'	Report	Emaná 6'; Lara 89'

Estadio Eladio Rosabal Cordero, Heredia
Attendance: 6,000
Referee: Walter López (Guatemala)

=== Group 4 ===
Team	Pld	W	D	L	GF	GA	GD	Pts	Qualification	ALA	AME	SM
(Costa Rica) Alajuelense	4	3	0	1	4	1	+3	9	Advance to championship stage		1–0	2–0
(Mexico) América	4	2	0	2	4	2	+2	6		0–1		3–0
(Panama) Sporting San Miguelito	4	1	0	3	1	6	−5	3		1–0	0–1	

August 7, 2013
22:00

Sporting San Miguelito (Panama)	0–1	(Mexico) América
	Report	Bermúdez 24'

Estadio Rommel Fernández, Panama City
Attendance: 3,000
Referee: Oscar Reyna (Guatemala)

August 22, 2013
22:00

Sporting San Miguelito (Panama)	1–0	(Costa Rica) Alajuelense
Pretelt 38'	Report

Estadio Rommel Fernández, Panama City
Referee: Valdin Legister (Jamaica)

August 29, 2013
22:00

Alajuelense (Costa Rica)	1–0	(Mexico) América
Sánchez 83' (pen.)	Report

Estadio Alejandro Morera Soto, Alajuela
Referee: Elmer Bonilla (El Salvador)

September 17, 2013
22:00

América (Mexico)	3–0	(Panama) Sporting San Miguelito
Jiménez 40', 78'; Andrade 81'	Report

Estadio Azteca, Mexico City
Referee: Enrico Wijngaarde (Suriname)

September 26, 2013
22:00

Alajuelense (Costa Rica)	2–0	(Panama) Sporting San Miguelito
Palacios 62'; Alpízar 76'	Report

Estadio Alejandro Morera Soto, Alajuela
Attendance: 6,000
Referee: Juan Guzman (United States)

October 22, 2013
20:00

América (Mexico)	0–1	(Costa Rica) Alajuelense
	Report	Palacios 55'

Estadio Azteca, Mexico City
Attendance: 20,000
Referee: Roberto Moreno (Panama)

=== Group 5 ===
Team	Pld	W	D	L	GF	GA	GD	Pts	Qualification	SJ	MTL	HER
(United States) San Jose Earthquakes	4	2	0	2	4	2	+2	6 (Note: All three teams are tied on points, and so are ranked by overall goal difference, then overall goals scored.)	Advance to championship stage		3–0	1–0
(Canada) Montreal Impact	4	2	0	2	3	4	−1	6		1–0		2–0
(Guatemala) Heredia	4	2	0	2	2	3	−1	6		1–0	1–0	

Notes:
August 7, 2013
20:00

Montreal Impact (Canada)	1–0	(United States) San Jose Earthquakes
Camara 17'	Report

Saputo Stadium, Montreal
Attendance: 15,115
Referee: Javier Santos (Puerto Rico)

August 21, 2013
22:00

Heredia (Guatemala)	1–0	(Canada) Montreal Impact
Córdoba 88'	Report

Estadio Cementos Progreso, Guatemala City
Referee: Paul Delgadillo (Mexico)

August 28, 2013
22:00

Heredia (Guatemala)	1–0	(United States) San Jose Earthquakes
Miranda 68'	Report

Estadio Cementos Progreso, Guatemala City
Referee: José Alfredo Peñaloza (Mexico)

September 17, 2013
22:00

San Jose Earthquakes (United States)	3–0	(Canada) Montreal Impact
Wondolowski 21'; Chávez 57'; Salinas 84'	Report

Buck Shaw Stadium, Santa Clara
Referee: Armando Castro (Honduras)

September 24, 2013
20:00

Montreal Impact (Canada)	2–0	(Guatemala) Heredia
Paponi 4'; Wenger 54'	Report

Saputo Stadium, Montreal
Attendance: 13,703
Referee: Courtney Campbell (Jamaica)

October 23, 2013
22:00

San Jose Earthquakes (United States)	1–0	(Guatemala) Heredia
Wondolowski 62'	Report

Buck Shaw Stadium, Santa Clara
Attendance: 4,744
Referee: Roberto García (Mexico)

=== Group 6 ===
Team	Pld	W	D	L	GF	GA	GD	Pts	Qualification	TOL	COM	CAL
(Mexico) Toluca	4	4	0	0	15	4	+11	12	Advance to championship stage		5–1	3–1
(Guatemala) Comunicaciones	4	2	0	2	7	7	0	6		1–2		2–0
(Trinidad and Tobago) Caledonia AIA	4	0	0	4	2	13	−11	0		1–5	0–3	

August 6, 2013
20:00

Toluca (Mexico)	3–1	(Trinidad and Tobago) Caledonia AIA
Benítez 24'; Almazán 30'; Nava 61'	Report	Wade 88'

Estadio Nemesio Díez, Toluca
Attendance: 5,000
Referee: John Pitti (Panama)

August 22, 2013
22:00

Comunicaciones (Guatemala)	1–2	(Mexico) Toluca
López 19'	Report	Nava 17'; Cacho 26' (pen.)

Estadio Cementos Progreso, Guatemala City
Attendance: 12,000
Referee: Javier Santos (Puerto Rico)

August 29, 2013
20:00

Caledonia AIA (Trinidad and Tobago)	0–3	(Guatemala) Comunicaciones
	Report	Suárez 11', 62', 90+4'

Hasely Crawford Stadium, Port of Spain
Referee: Erick Andino (Honduras)

September 18, 2013
20:00

Caledonia AIA (Trinidad and Tobago)	1–5	(Mexico) Toluca
Bain 46'	Report	Nava 18', 67'; Muhammad 28' (o.g.); Brambila 41'; Sinha 72'

Hasely Crawford Stadium, Port of Spain
Attendance: 500
Referee: Valdin Legister (Jamaica)

September 25, 2013
22:00

Comunicaciones (Guatemala)	2–0	(Trinidad and Tobago) Caledonia AIA
Arreola 30'; Benítez 42'	Report

Estadio Cementos Progreso, Guatemala City
Referee: Marcos Brea (Cuba)

October 23, 2013
20:00

Toluca (Mexico)	5–1	(Guatemala) Comunicaciones
Nava 5', 89'; Benítez 23', 72'; Trejo 67'	Report	Márquez 54'

Estadio Nemesio Díez, Toluca
Attendance: 6,000
Referee: Wálter Quesada (Costa Rica)

=== Group 7 ===
Team	Pld	W	D	L	GF	GA	GD	Pts	Qualification	TIJ	FIR	VIC
(Mexico) Tijuana	4	3	1	0	10	2	+8	10	Advance to championship stage		1–0	6–0
(El Salvador) Luis Ángel Firpo	4	2	1	1	6	3	+3	7		0–0		2–1
(Honduras) Victoria	4	0	0	4	4	15	−11	0		2–3	1–4	

August 6, 2013
22:00

Luis Ángel Firpo (El Salvador)	0–0	(Mexico) Tijuana
	Report

Estadio Cuscatlán, San Salvador
Attendance: 2,000
Referee: Henry Bejarano (Costa Rica)

August 20, 2013
22:00

Victoria (Honduras)	2–3	(Mexico) Tijuana
Crisanto 48' (pen.); Elvir 86'	Report	Arriola 12'; Olsina 41'; Pellerano 69'

Estadio Nilmo Edwards, La Ceiba
Referee: Marlon Mejía (El Salvador)

August 28, 2013
22:00

Tijuana (Mexico)	1–0	(El Salvador) Luis Ángel Firpo
Martínez 82'	Report

Estadio Caliente, Tijuana
Referee: Silviu Petrescu (Canada)

September 19, 2013
22:00

Luis Ángel Firpo (El Salvador)	2–1	(Honduras) Victoria
Guevara 72'; Rivera 82'	Report	Hoyos 19'

Estadio Cuscatlán, San Salvador
Referee: Jafeth Perea (Panama)

September 26, 2013
22:00

Tijuana (Mexico)	6–0	(Honduras) Victoria
Olsina 17'; Arriola 32'; Cerda 35'; Gomez 60', 68', 85'	Report

Estadio Caliente, Tijuana
Attendance: 17,000
Referee: Elmer Bonilla (El Salvador)

October 23, 2013
22:00

Victoria (Honduras)	1–4	(El Salvador) Luis Ángel Firpo
Vuelto 50'	Report	García 45+2' (pen.); Canales 68', 81'; Guevara 86'

Estadio Nilmo Edwards, La Ceiba
Referee: Oscar Reyna (Guatemala)

=== Group 8 ===
Team	Pld	W	D	L	GF	GA	GD	Pts	Qualification	LA	CAR	MET
(United States) LA Galaxy	4	3	0	1	6	4	+2	9	Advance to championship stage		2–0	1–0
(Costa Rica) Cartaginés	4	1	1	2	4	7	−3	4 (Note: Cartaginés and Isidro Metapán are ranked on head-to-head record.)		0–3		0–0
(El Salvador) Isidro Metapán	4	1	1	2	6	5	+1	4		4–0	2–4	

Notes:
August 8, 2013
22:00

Isidro Metapán (El Salvador)	2–4	(Costa Rica) Cartaginés
Sirias 45' (o.g.); Muñoz 56'	Report	Herrera 41', 69', 80'; Flores 45+2'

Estadio Cuscatlán, San Salvador
Referee: Juan Guzman (United States)

August 20, 2013
22:00

LA Galaxy (United States)	2–0	(Costa Rica) Cartaginés
Keane 66', 90+4'	Report

StubHub Center, Carson
Attendance: 9,474
Referee: Héctor Rodríguez (Honduras)

August 27, 2013
22:00

Cartaginés (Costa Rica)	0–0	(El Salvador) Isidro Metapán
	Report

Estadio Nacional de Costa Rica, San José
Referee: Trevor Taylor (Barbados)

September 18, 2013
22:00

LA Galaxy (United States)	1–0	(El Salvador) Isidro Metapán
Courtois 7'	Report

StubHub Center, Carson
Attendance: 6,211
Referee: Hugo Cruz (Costa Rica)

September 25, 2013
22:00

Cartaginés (Costa Rica)	0–3	(United States) LA Galaxy
	Report	McBean 6'; Hoffman 18'; Courtois 29'

Estadio Nacional de Costa Rica, San José
Referee: John Pitti (Panama)

October 24, 2013
22:00

Isidro Metapán (El Salvador)	4–0	(United States) LA Galaxy
Muñoz 30', 31', 33', 41'	Report

Estadio Cuscatlán, San Salvador
Referee: Paul Delgadillo (Mexico)
