= Pablo Barrera =

Mexican footballer (born 1987)

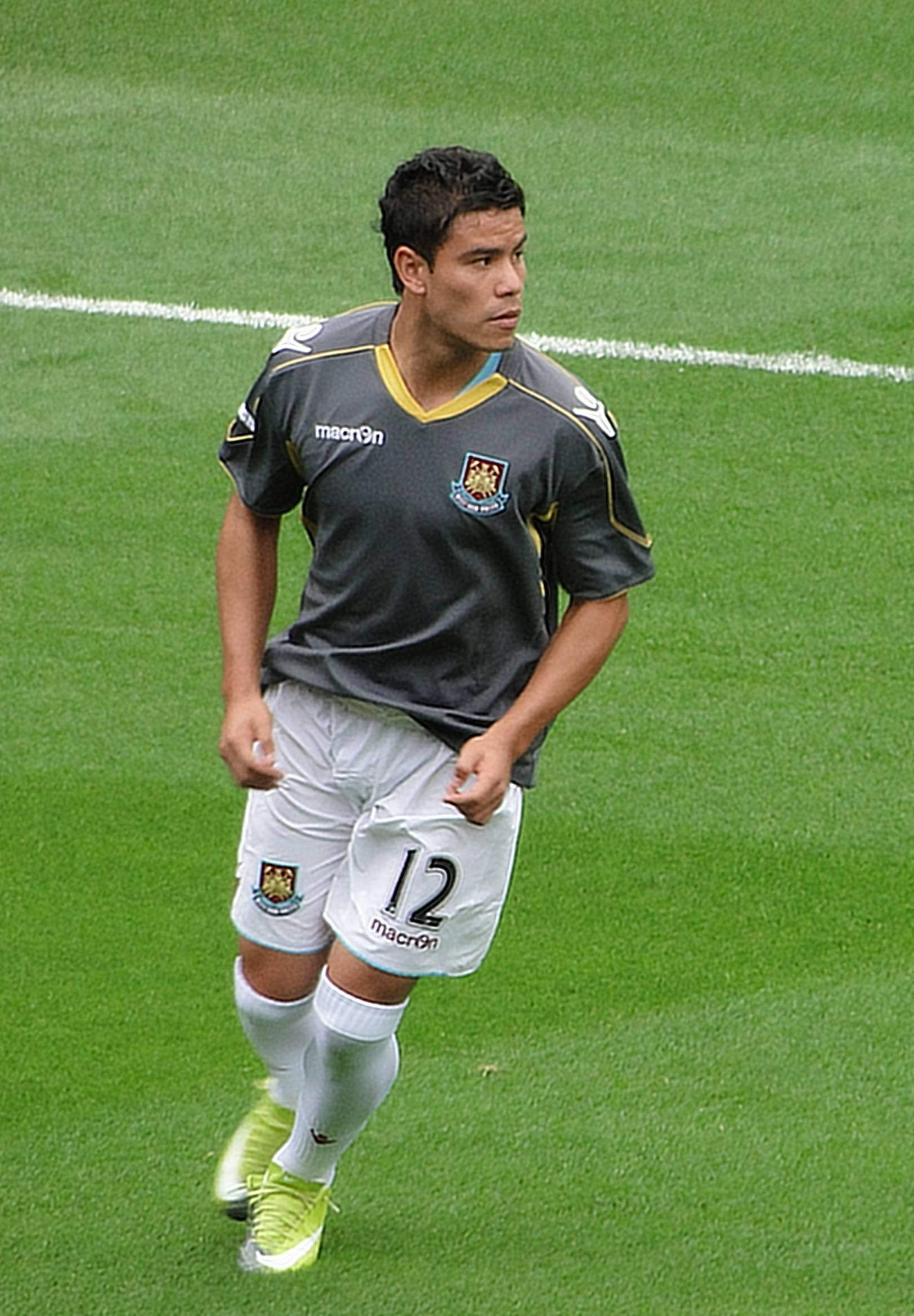
- Barrera playing for West Ham United in 2010

Personal information
- Full name: Pablo Edson Barrera Acosta
- Date of birth: 21 June 1987 (age 39)
- Place of birth: Tlalnepantla, Mexico
- Height: 1.78 m (5 ft 10 in)
- Position: Winger

Senior career*
Years	Team	Apps	(Gls)
2005–2010	UNAM	73	(17)
2010–2012	West Ham United	15	(0)
2011–2012	→ Zaragoza (loan)	20	(1)
2012–2014	Cruz Azul	50	(4)
2015–2016	Monterrey	38	(3)
2016–2020	UNAM	113	(15)
2020–2021	Atlético San Luis	29	(1)
2021–2025	Querétaro	131	(17)

International career
2007	Mexico U20	5	(2)
2008	Mexico U23	8	(0)
2007–2013	Mexico	57	(6)
Medal record
Representing Mexico
CONCACAF Gold Cup
Winner	CONCACAF Gold Cup	2009
Winner	CONCACAF Gold Cup	2011
- * Club domestic league appearances and goals as of 10 March 2025

Pablo Edson Barrera Acosta (born 21 June 1987) is a Mexican former professional footballer who played as a winger.

== Club career ==
=== Club Universidad Nacional ===
Born in Tlalnepantla, Mexico, Barrera began his career as a midfielder for Mexico City-based club Universidad Nacional, also known as Pumas. He joined Pumas youth system at the age of 11 and worked his way through the ranks to make his debut in the Primera División in 2005. He was involved in all the plays in Pumas' 8–0 victory over Veracruz.

In July 2008, Barrera had surgery to repair a ruptured cruciate ligament in his left knee that would sideline him for six months.

In early January, Barrera came back from his injury and in his very first game back he scored a goal against Necaxa. He was a starter until manager Ricardo Ferreti put him on the bench. He scored another goal that same season against Puebla. He would help Pumas reach the final in which they faced Pachuca and scored the winning goal that gave Pumas the win in the second half of overtime. Barrera enjoyed his finest season in the Torneo Bicentenario 2010 scoring six goals in 13 games, though his season was cut short as he was called up to the Mexico national football team pre-World Cup training camp.

=== West Ham United ===
On 16 July 2010 Barrera signed for West Ham United on a four-year contract, with a one-year option, for fee of £4m. He became West Ham's second summer signing of 2010. He made his Premier League debut, on 14 August, in a 3–0 loss to Aston Villa, coming on as a second-half substitute for Luis Boa Morte.

After making only six Premier League starts, scoring no goals and having zero assists, and not being able to help keep West Ham out of relegation, Barrera's first season in England was considered a "flop". It was reported during the summer 2011 transfer window that La Liga club Real Zaragoza wanted to sign Barrera, which would have re-united him with ex-Mexico national team coach Javier Aguirre.

==== Real Zaragoza (loan) ====
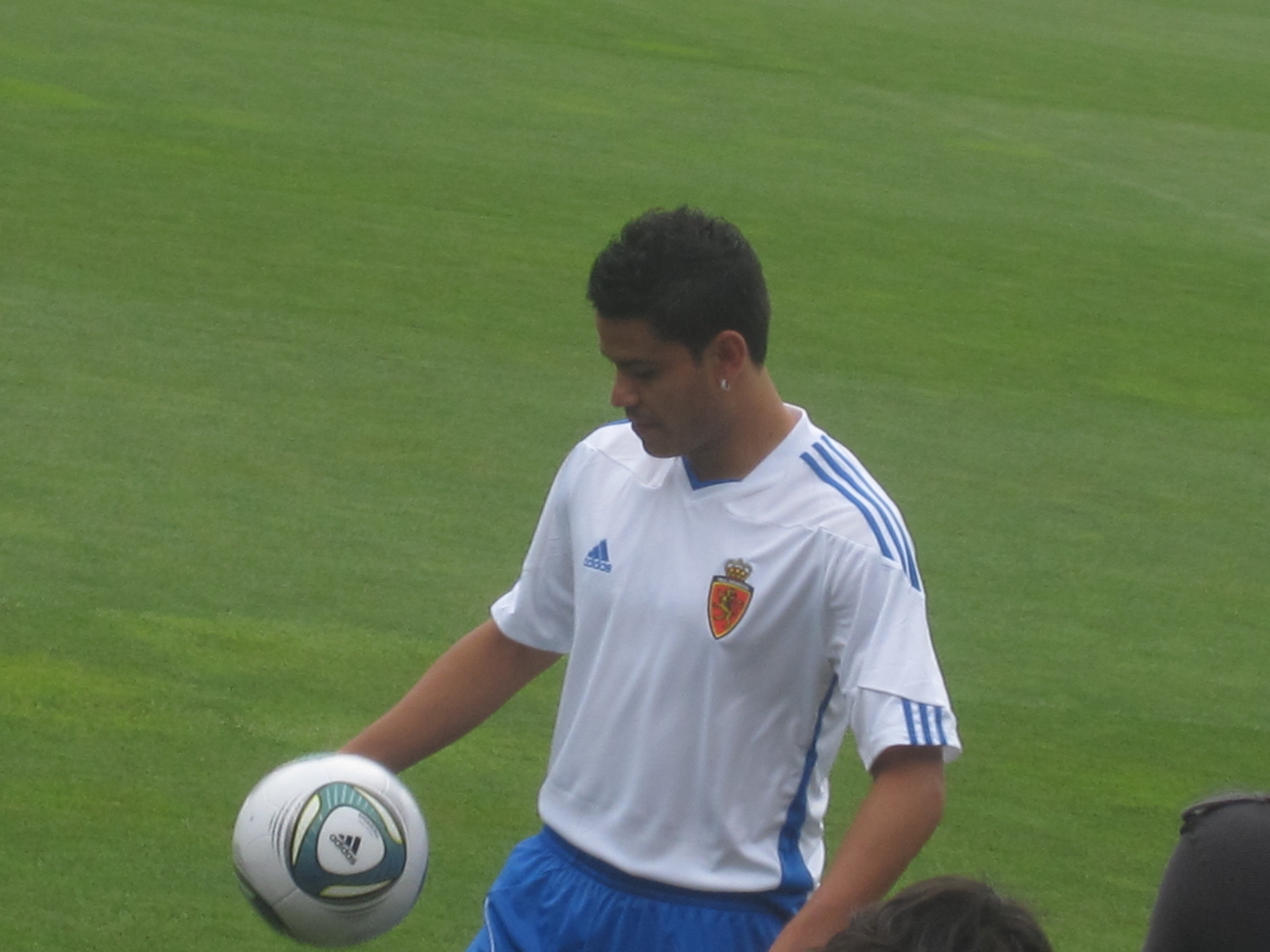
Barrera during his presentation in August 2011

On 25 August 2011, Barrera joined Spanish club Real Zaragoza on a season-long loan, which would reunite him with former Mexico national team manager Javier Aguirre and teammate Efraín Juárez. He scored his first La Liga goal for Zaragoza in a 2–2 draw against Villarreal. After the sacking of Aguirre, and the appointment of Manolo Jiménez as new manager, Barrera was slowly relegated to the bench.

=== Cruz Azul ===
On 3 July 2012, Cruz Azul announced the signing of Barrera who returned to Mexico after a two-year stint in Europe.

=== Late Career ===
The second half of Barrera's career took him through Monterrey, Universidad Nacional, and Atlético San Luis, with Querétaro serving as his final club.

== International career ==
=== Youth ===
Barrera participated at the 2007 FIFA U-20 World Cup in Canada, where he scored two goals.

=== Senior ===
==== Debut, 2009 CONCACAF Gold Cup ====
Barrera has appeared for the senior national team, making his debut in a friendly against Guatemala on 17 October 2007.
He scored his first international goal against Nicaragua on 5 July 2009 at the 2009 CONCACAF Gold Cup. He scored his second goal with "El Tri" in a game against Haiti national football team at the Gold Cup.

==== 2010 FIFA World Cup ====
Barrera appeared in three matches at the 2010 FIFA World Cup for Mexico. Barrera made his debut in the second match against France, coming on in the 31st minute for an injured Carlos Vela. Barrera caused the second goal for Mexico when French defender Eric Abidal knocked him down in the penalty area and was given a penalty which Cuauhtémoc Blanco scored and Mexico ended up winning the match 2–0.

==== 2011 Gold Cup ====
He was called up to participate in the 2011 CONCACAF Gold Cup. He scored the fourth goal in the 4–1 win against Costa Rica. On 25 June Barerra scored a brace against the United States in the final where Mexico won 4–2.

== Career statistics ==
=== Club ===
Updated 17 August 2012

Club performance			League		Cup		League cup		Continental		Total	
Season	Club	League	Apps	Goals	Apps	Goals	Apps	Goals	Apps	Goals	Apps	Goals
Mexico			League		Cup		League Cup		North America		Total	
2005–06	UNAM	Primera División	1	0	–		–		–		1	0
2006–07	UNAM	Primera División	5	0	–		–		–		5	0
2007–08	UNAM	Primera División	31	4	–		–		–		31	4
2008–09	UNAM	Primera División	20	3	–		–		2	0	22	3
2009–10	UNAM	Primera División	28	11	–		–		3	3	31	14
England			League		FA Cup		League Cup		Europe		Total	
2010–11	West Ham United	Premier League	14	0	3	0	4	0	–		21	0
2011–12	West Ham United	Championship	1	0	–		1	0	–		2	0
Spain			League		Copa del Rey		Supercopa de España		Europe		Total	
2011–12	Zaragoza	La Liga	20	1	–		–		–		20	1
Total	Mexico		85	18	–	–	–	–	5	3	90	21
Total	England		15	0	3	0	5	0	–	–	23	0
Total	Spain		20	1	0	0	–	–	–	–	20	1
Total			120	19	3	0	5	0	5	3	133	22

=== International ===
As of 22 June 2013

National team	Year	Apps	Goals
Mexico	2007	1	0
Mexico	2008	1	0
Mexico	2009	9	2
Mexico	2010	17	1
Mexico	2011	16	3
Mexico	2012	7	0
Mexico	2013	6	0
Total		57	6

=== International goals ===
Scores and results list Mexico's goal tally first.

Goal	Date	Venue	Opponent	Score	Result	Competition
1.	5 July 2009	Oakland–Alameda County Coliseum, Oakland, United States	Nicaragua	2–0	2–0	2009 CONCACAF Gold Cup
2.	19 July 2009	Cowboys Stadium, Arlington, United States	Haiti	4–0	4–0	2009 CONCACAF Gold Cup
3.	24 February 2010	Candlestick Park, San Francisco, United States	Bolivia	1–0	5–0	Friendly
4.	12 June 2011	Soldier Field, Chicago, United States	Costa Rica	4–0	4–1	2011 CONCACAF Gold Cup
5.	25 June 2011	Rose Bowl, Pasadena, United States	United States	1–2	4–2	2011 CONCACAF Gold Cup
6.	25 June 2011	Rose Bowl, Pasadena, United States	United States	3–2	4–2	2011 CONCACAF Gold Cup

== Honours ==
UNAM

- Mexican Primera División: Clausura 2009

Cruz Azul

- Copa MX: Clausura 2013
- CONCACAF Champions League: 2013–14

Mexico

- CONCACAF Gold Cup: 2009, 2011

Individual

- Mexican Primera División Best Rookie: Apertura 2007
- CONCACAF Gold Cup top assist provider: 2011 (shared)
