= Luis Fraiz =

Panamanian footballer (born 1993)

Personal information
- Full name: Luis Cesar Fraiz Santamaría
- Date of birth: 13 June 1993 (age 33)
- Place of birth: Panama City, Panama
- Height: 1.76 m (5 ft 9 in)
- Position: Defender

Team information
- Current team: Plaza Amador
- Number: 16

Senior career*
Years	Team	Apps	(Gls)
2011–2016	Árabe Unido	57	(4)
2014–2015	→ Frosinone (loan)	1	(0)
2016–	Plaza Amador		
- * Club domestic league appearances and goals as of 2 June 2014 ‡ National team caps and goals as of 14 November 2012

Luis Cesar Fraiz Santamaría (born 13 June 1993) is a Panamanian football defender who plays for Plaza Amador.

== Club career ==
Fraiz was part of the Frosinone squad that won the club a first promotion to Serie A in 2015, but played only a league game himself.
