= Ricardo Morris (footballer, born 1992) =

Jamaican footballer

Personal information
- Full name: Ricardo Wayne Morris
- Date of birth: 2 November 1992 (age 34)
- Place of birth: Jamaica
- Height: 1.78 m (5 ft 10 in)
- Position: Midfielder

Team information
- Current team: Portmore United
- Number: 8

Senior career*
Years	Team	Apps	(Gls)
2011–2014	Portmore United	65	(4)
2014	Tampa Bay Rowdies	7	(0)
2015	Montego Bay United	9	(0)
2015–	Portmore United	86	(22)
2019	→ VPS (loan)	8	(0)

International career^{‡}
2014–	Jamaica	17	(2)
Medal record
Men's football
Representing Jamaica
CONCACAF Gold Cup
Runner-up	2017 United States	Team
- * Club domestic league appearances and goals as of 11:23, 16 November 2019 (UTC) ‡ National team caps and goals as of 11:23, 16 November 2019 (UTC)

Ricardo Wayne Morris (born 2 November 1992) is a Jamaican international footballer who plays for Portmore United, as a midfielder.

== Club career ==
Morris has played club football for Portmore United, Tampa Bay Rowdies and Montego Bay United.

In March 2010, Morris had heart surgery.

In 2019, Morris went on loan to VPS in Finland.

== International career ==
He made his international debut for Jamaica in 2014.

=== International goals ===
Scores and results list Jamaica's goal tally first.

No.	Date	Venue	Opponent	Score	Result	Competition
1.	14 October 2018	Ergilio Hato Stadium, Willemstad, Curaçao	Bonaire	2–0	6–0	2019–20 CONCACAF Nations League qualification
2.	14 October 2018	Ergilio Hato Stadium, Willemstad, Curaçao	Bonaire	4–0	6–0	2019–20 CONCACAF Nations League qualification
3.	15 November 2019	Sir Vivian Richards Stadium, North Sound, Antigua and Barbuda	Antigua and Barbuda	1–0	2–0	2019–20 CONCACAF Nations League B

== Honors ==
=== Portmore United ===
- Jamaica Premier League (2): 2017–18, 2018–19
