= Samuel Pompée =

Haitian footballer (born 1994)

Personal information
- Full name: Mardoché Samuel Pompée
- Date of birth: April 12, 1994 (age 32)
- Place of birth: La Gonâve, Haiti
- Position: Defender

Team information
- Current team: Violette

Senior career*
Years	Team	Apps	(Gls)
2012–2015	Valencia		
2015–2016	G.D. Gafanha		
2016–2018	Don Bosco		
2018–2019	Valencia		
2019–2020	Cavaly		
2020–2022	Violette		
2022–2023	FC Motown		
2023–	Violette		

International career
2017–	Haiti	3	(0)
- * Club domestic league appearances and goals as of 13 March 2023 (UTC)

Mardoché Samuel Pompée (born 12 April 1994, La Gonâve, Haiti) is a Haitian footballer who currently plays for Violette.

== Club career ==
Pompée started his career with Valencia of Léogâne and won the Ligue Haïtienne in 2012.

At the end of his time with Valencia, Pompée then signed a two-year contract with third division Portuguese club G.D. Gafanha.

After his stint in Portugal, Pompée returned to his native Haiti to play for Don Bosco.

Pompée and his club Don Bosco qualified for the 2016–17 CONCACAF Champions League, where he started in all four matches before being eliminated.

== International career ==
Pompée made his international debut for the Haiti national football team against Trinidad and Tobago on 8 January 2017.
