= Mauro Formica =

Argentine footballer

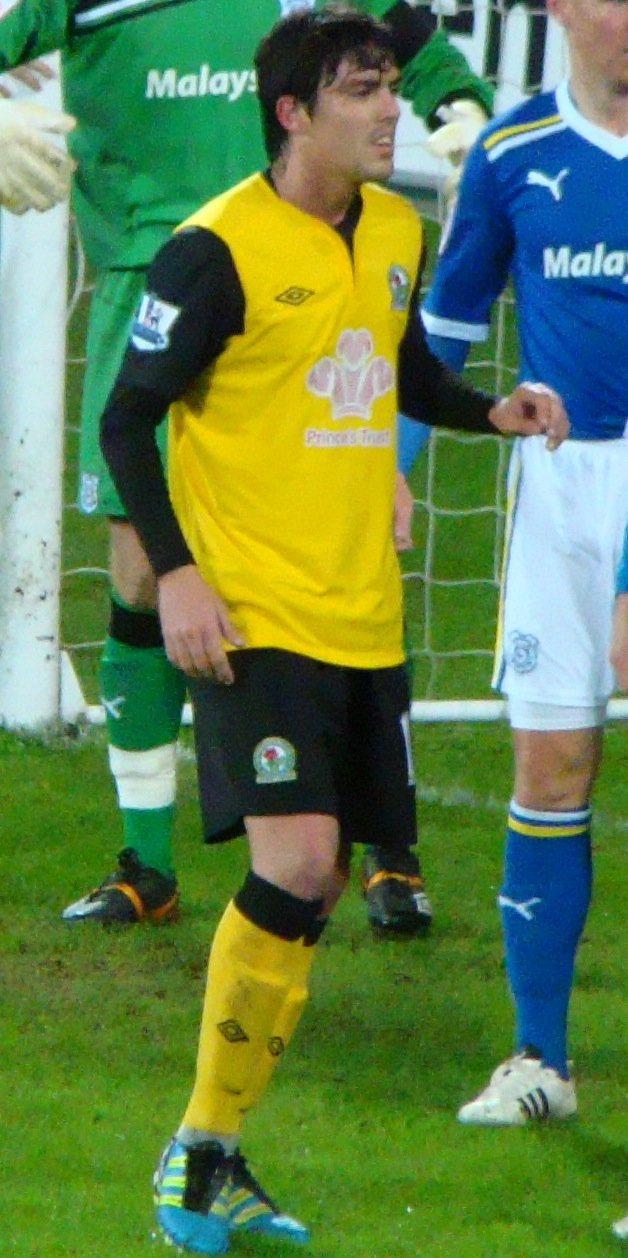
- Formica with Blackburn Rovers in 2011

Personal information
- Full name: Mauro Abel Formica
- Date of birth: 4 April 1988 (age 38)
- Place of birth: Rosario, Argentina
- Height: 1.75 m (5 ft 9 in)
- Position: Attacking midfielder

Youth career
- Newell's Old Boys

Senior career*
Years	Team	Apps	(Gls)
2006–2011	Newell's Old Boys	76	(17)
2011–2013	Blackburn Rovers	49	(5)
2013	→ Palermo (loan)	8	(1)
2013–2017	Cruz Azul	55	(8)
2015–2017	→ Newell's Old Boys (loan)	44	(7)
2017–2018	UNAM	21	(0)
2018–2021	Newell's Old Boys	53	(6)
2021–2022	Colón	18	(0)
2023	Defensores de Belgrano	11	(0)
Total		335	(44)

International career
2005–2006	Argentina U17	4	(2)
2011	Argentina	1	(0)
- * Club domestic league appearances and goals

Mauro Abel Formica (born 4 April 1988) is an Argentine former professional footballer who played as an attacking midfielder. He is nicknamed El Gato (The Cat).

== Club career ==
=== Newell's Old Boys ===
Having signed a professional contract, Formica made his professional debut for Newell's Old Boys on 29 September 2006 at the age of 18, in a match against Club Atlético Colón, as the teams drew 1–1. After two-years since professional at Newell's Old Boys, Formica soon established himself in the first team in 2008–09 and in Torneo Apertura on 13 December 2008, Formica scored his first goal in a 3–0 win over Racing Club. Soon after, on the opening game of the season, Formica scored his first goal (and scored another) and set up a goal for Leandro Armani in a 3–0 win over Gimnasia. Soon in mid-May, Formica scored three goals in three consecutive games, against River Plate, Arsenal de Sarandí and Rosario Central. After the end of the season, Formica made sixteen appearances (having missed four appearances due to slight injury) and scoring seven.

The following season, Formica continued to retain his first team and in Torneo Inicial, Formica scored four goals in nineteen appearances. Shortly after the end of Torneo Inicial, Formica played his first game of Copa Libertadores in a 0–0 draw against Emelec in the first leg but the club was eliminated in the second leg, with a 2–1 score for Emelec. On the final game of the season of Torneo Final, Formica scored twice and set up a goal for Lucas Bernardi in a 6–1 win over Gimnasia, the team which he scored his first goal.

His good performance attracted attention from Europe with the likes of Ajax, AS Monaco, Galatasaray and Arsenal. Russian side Rubin Kazan made a bid for Formica but the offer was rejected. Soon after rival River Plate tried to sign him but the offer was also rejected.

Though rebuffing offers from Europe, Formica playing time was reduced under new manager Roberto Sensini. Though fallen out, Formica continued his form in Copa Sudamericana, scoring three goals, against Estudiantes and a brace against Club San Jose.

After leaving Newell's Old Boys, Formica played a total of 84 games scoring 22 goals for the club over 5 years. While at Newell's Old Boys, Formica is known for his technique, dribbling and speed. He is also known for his great shot from half-distance.

=== Blackburn Rovers ===
On the last day of the transfer window, Formica signed for Blackburn Rovers – on a four-year deal – reported to be worth around £4 million. Then-manager Steve Kean described Formica as a young Gabriel Batistuta, believing he's best prospects in Argentine football. However, Formica did not break into the squad, appearing instead for Blackburn reserves, often due to a lack of match fitness.

Kean tipped Formica as a future star going into his second season with Rovers, and on 13 August 2011, Formica scored on his Premier League debut for Rovers against Wolverhampton Wanderers in a 2–1 defeat at Ewood Park. On 20 August 2011, he came on for Jason Roberts on 75 minutes in a 3–1 defeat against Aston Villa at Villa Park. Four days later, Formica started and played the full 90 minutes in a 3–1 victory over Sheffield Wednesday at Ewood Park in the second round of the League Cup. On 27 August 2011, Formica won two penalties in a home league game against Everton. He missed one and so did Junior Hoilett, the match ended with Everton winning 1–0. In the January transfer window, Formica was expected to leave Blackburn, having been named one of Blackburn's player to leave the club, reportedly for personal reasons. Several days later, Formica revealed the club rejected a move back to his former club, with Blackburn want to sell for €5million. In mid-January, Formica was also linked with a move to Greek side Olympiacos, where he would join his brother, playing for a different Greek club. His brother told Sport24 that Mauro want to leave Blackburn, insisting the talk is ongoing However, the move to Greece fell through, as the club were unable to meet Blackburn's asking price. Later in the season, Formica would score three more goals against Tottenham Hotspur, Fulham and Norwich City. However, at the end of the season, Blackburn were relegated to the Championship.

Formica was in and out of the first team, due to change of management. On 17 November 2012, Formica scored his first goal of the season in a 4–1 win over Peterborough United and several weeks on, Formica made his last appearance in a 4–1 loss against Cardiff City. Formica hadn't played since throughout December and January, due to injury on the knee.

=== Palermo ===
On 23 January 2013, Serie A strugglers Palermo announced on their website to have signed Formica on loan until the end of the season, with an option to make the move permanent during the period of the loan spell. He made his debut four days later, as a second-half substitute for Josip Iličić in a 1–1 draw at Cagliari. In the next match in a 2–1 loss against Atalanta, Formica provided assist for Nélson Marcos from a cross, with Nélson scoring from a backheel.

=== Cruz Azul ===
On 13 August 2013, Cruz Azul announced on their website that they had signed Mauro Formica.

=== Defensores de Belgrano ===
On 30 January 2023, Formica was announced as a new reinforcement for Club Atlético Defensores de Belgrano.

=== Retirement ===
After playing against San Telmo, with a 2–0 victory for the locals, on 18 June 2023, he announced his final retirement from professional soccer, after almost 18 years in the discipline.

== International career ==
Formica played his first cap, coming on for Ariel Cabral, in a 2–1 loss against Poland on 5 June 2011.

== Personal life ==
Mauro is the younger brother of fellow professional player Lautaro Formica.

== Career statistics ==
Appearances and goals by club, season and competition
Club	Season	League		National cup		League cup		Continental (Note: Includes Copa Libertadores and Copa Sudamericana.)		Total	
Club	Season	Apps	Goals	Apps	Goals	Apps	Goals	Apps	Goals	Apps	Goals
Newell's Old Boys	2007–08	4	0	–		–		0	0	4	0
Newell's Old Boys	2008–09	19	7	–		–		0	0	19	7
Newell's Old Boys	2009–10	36	8	–		–		2	0	38	8
Newell's Old Boys	2010–11	17	2	–		–		6	3	23	5
Newell's Old Boys	2015	3	0	–		–		0	0	3	0
Newell's Old Boys	2016	14	0	2	0	–		0	0	16	0
Newell's Old Boys	2016–17	9	4	–		–		0	0	9	4
Newell's Old Boys	Total	102	21	2	0	0	0	8	3	112	24
Blackburn Rovers	2011–12	34	4	1	0	4	0	–		39	4
Blackburn Rovers	2012–13	15	1	0	0	1	0	–		16	1
Blackburn Rovers	Total	49	5	2	0	4	0	0	0	55	5
Palermo	2012–13	8	1	–		–		–		8	1
Cruz Azul	2013–14	29	7	–		–		9	1	38	8
Cruz Azul	2014–15	29	1	–		–		7	1	36	2
Cruz Azul	Total	58	8	0	0	0	0	16	2	74	10
Career total		219	35	3	0	5	0	24	5	251	40

== Honours ==
Cruz Azul

- CONCACAF Champions League: 2013–14
