= 2013–14 CONCACAF Champions League =

49th edition of premier club football tournament organized by CONCACAF

Tournament details
- Dates: August 6, 2013 – April 23, 2014
- Teams: 24 (from 11 associations)

Final positions
- Champions: (Mexico) Cruz Azul (6th title)
- Runners-up: (Mexico) Toluca

Tournament statistics
- Matches played: 62
- Goals scored: 151 (2.44 per match)
- Top scorer(s): (Mexico) Raúl Nava (7 goals)
- Best player(s): (Argentina) Mariano Pavone
- Best goalkeeper: (Mexico) Alfredo Talavera

The 2013–14 CONCACAF Champions League was the 6th edition of the CONCACAF Champions League under its current name, and overall the 49th edition of the premier football club competition organized by CONCACAF, the regional governing body of North America, Central America and the Caribbean. Monterrey were the three-time defending champions, but were unable to defend their title as they failed to qualify for the tournament.

Cruz Azul won a record-setting sixth CONCACAF club title (and their first during the Champions League era), after winning an all-Mexican final over Toluca on away goals. As a result, they qualified as the CONCACAF representative at the 2014 FIFA Club World Cup.

== Qualification ==
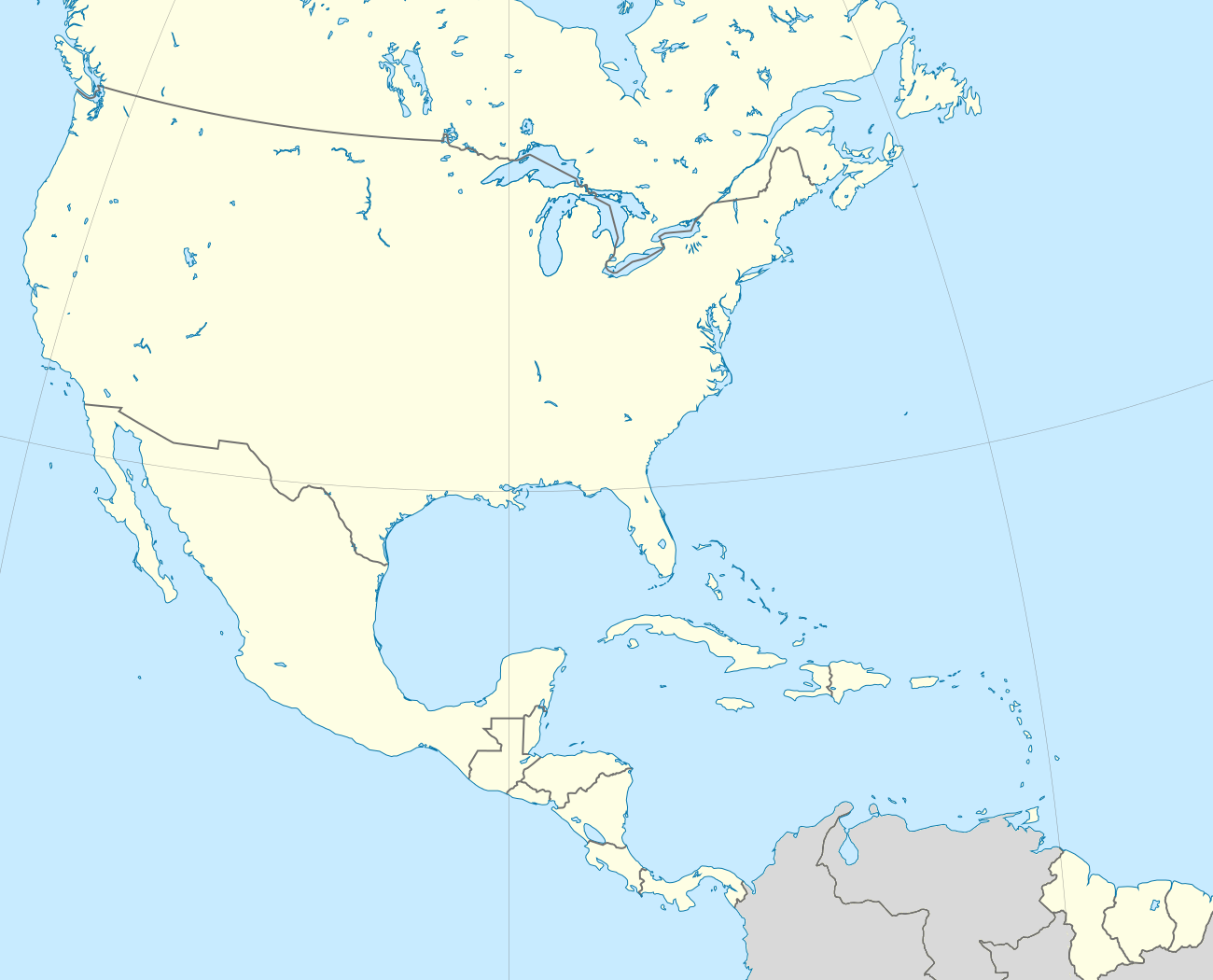
Location of teams of the 2013–14 CONCACAF Champions League
Brown: Group 1; Red: Group 2; Orange: Group 3; Yellow: Group 4;
Green: Group 5; Blue: Group 6; Purple: Group 7; Pink: Group 8.

Twenty-four teams participate in the CONCACAF Champions League: nine from the North American Zone, twelve from the Central American Zone, and three from the Caribbean Zone.

Clubs may be disqualified and replaced by a club from another association if the club does not have an available stadium that meets CONCACAF regulations for safety. If a club's own stadium fails to meet the set standards then it may find a suitable replacement stadium within its own country. However, if it is still determined that the club cannot provide the adequate facilities then it runs the risk of being replaced.

=== North America ===
Nine teams from the North American Football Union qualify to the Champions League. Mexico and the United States are each allocated four spots, the most of any of the CONCACAF's member associations, while Canada is granted one spot in the tournament.

For Mexico, the winners of the Liga MX Apertura and Clausura tournaments earn berths in Pot A of the tournament's group stage, while the Apertura and Clausura runners-up earn berths in Pot B.

For the United States, three spots are allocated through the Major League Soccer (MLS) regular season and playoffs; the fourth spot is allocated to the winner of its domestic cup competition, the Lamar Hunt U.S. Open Cup. The MLS Cup winner and the Supporters' Shield winner (if U.S.-based) are placed in Pot A; the MLS Cup runner-up (if U.S.-based) and the U.S. Open Cup winner are placed in Pot B. If any of the above spots are taken by a Canada-based MLS team, the Champions League place is allocated to the U.S.-based team with the best MLS regular season record who has failed to otherwise qualify.

For Canada, the winner of the domestic cup competition, the Voyageurs Cup competed for in the Canadian Championship, earns the lone Canadian berth into the tournament, in Pot B.

=== Central America ===
Twelve teams from the Central American Football Union qualify to the Champions League. The allocation is as follows: two teams from each of Costa Rica, Honduras, Guatemala, Panama and El Salvador, and one team from each of Nicaragua and Belize.

For the Central American teams that qualify via split seasons, the aggregate record of the two tournaments within the season is used to determine which team gains the association's top spot. The pots of the teams are as follows:

- The top teams from the leagues of Costa Rica, Honduras, Guatemala and Panama are placed in Pot A.
- The top team from the league of El Salvador, and the second teams from the leagues of Costa Rica and Honduras are placed in Pot B.
- The second teams from the leagues of Guatemala, Panama and El Salvador, and the teams from the leagues of Nicaragua and Belize are placed in Pot C.

If one or more clubs is precluded, it is supplanted by a club from another Central American association. The reallocation is based on results from previous Champions League tournaments.

=== Caribbean ===
Three teams from the Caribbean Football Union qualify to the Champions League. The three berths, in Pot C, are allocated to the top three finishers of the CFU Club Championship, a subcontinental tournament for clubs from associations of the Caribbean Football Union. In order for a team to qualify for the CFU Club Championship, they usually need to finish as the champion or runner-up of their respective association's league in the previous season, but professional teams may also be selected by their associations if they play in the league of another country.

If any Caribbean club is precluded, it is supplanted by the fourth-place finisher from the CFU Club Championship.

== Teams ==
The following teams qualified for the tournament.

In the following table, the number of appearances, last appearance, and previous best result count only those in the CONCACAF Champions League era starting from 2008–09 (not counting those in the era of the Champions' Cup from 1962 to 2008).

Association	Team	Pot	Qualifying method	App	Last App	Previous Best
North America (9 teams)
(Mexico) Mexico; 4 berths	Tijuana	A	2012 Apertura champions	1st	N/A	N/A
(Mexico) Mexico; 4 berths	Toluca	B	2012 Apertura runners-up	3rd	2010–11	Semifinals
(Mexico) Mexico; 4 berths	América	A	2013 Clausura champions	1st	N/A	N/A
(Mexico) Mexico; 4 berths	Cruz Azul	B	2013 Clausura runners-up	4th	2010–11	Runner-up
(United States) United States; 4 berths	LA Galaxy	A	2012 MLS Cup champions	4th	2012–13	Semifinals
(United States) United States; 4 berths	San Jose Earthquakes	A	2012 MLS Supporters' Shield champions	1st	N/A	N/A
(United States) United States; 4 berths	Houston Dynamo	B	2012 MLS Cup runners-up	4th	2012–13	Quarterfinals
(United States) United States; 4 berths	Sporting Kansas City	B	2012 U.S. Open Cup champions	1st	N/A	N/A
(Canada) Canada; 1 berth	Montreal Impact	B	2013 Canadian Championship champions	2nd	2008–09	Quarterfinals
Central America (12 teams)
(Costa Rica) Costa Rica; 2 (+1) berths	Alajuelense	B	2012 Invierno champions	4th	2012–13	Group stage
(Costa Rica) Costa Rica; 2 (+1) berths	Herediano	A	2013 Verano champions	4th	2012–13	Quarterfinals
(Costa Rica) Costa Rica; 2 (+1) berths	Cartaginés	C	2013 Verano runners-up	1st	N/A	N/A
(Honduras) Honduras; 2 berths	Olimpia	A	2012 Apertura and 2013 Clausura champions	6th	2012–13	Quarterfinals
(Honduras) Honduras; 2 berths	Victoria	B	Runners-up with better aggregate record in 2012–13 season	1st	N/A	N/A
(Guatemala) Guatemala; 2 berths	Comunicaciones	A	2012 Apertura and 2013 Clausura champions	3rd	2011–12	Quarterfinals
(Guatemala) Guatemala; 2 berths	Heredia	C	Runners-up with better aggregate record in 2012–13 season	1st	N/A	N/A
(Panama) Panama; 2 berths	Árabe Unido	A	2012 Apertura champions	3rd	2010–11	Quarterfinals
(Panama) Panama; 2 berths	Sporting San Miguelito	C	2013 Clausura champions	1st	N/A	N/A
(El Salvador) El Salvador; 2 berths	Isidro Metapán	B	2012 Apertura champions	6th	2012–13	Quarterfinals
(El Salvador) El Salvador; 2 berths	Luis Ángel Firpo	C	2013 Clausura champions	3rd	2009–10	Group stage
(Nicaragua) Nicaragua; 1 berth	Real Estelí	C	2012 Apertura and 2013 Clausura champions	4th	2012–13	Group stage
Caribbean (3 teams)
Trinidad and Tobago	W Connection	C	2013 CFU Club Championship Group 1 winners	3rd	2012–13	Group stage
Trinidad and Tobago	Caledonia AIA	C	2013 CFU Club Championship Playoff round winners	2nd	2012–13	Group stage
Haiti	Valencia	C	2013 CFU Club Championship Group 2 winners	1st	N/A	N/A

Notes

1. Montreal Impact's previous appearance in 2008–09 was made by an earlier incarnation of the franchise with the same name, which played in the USL First Division. The current MLS club began play in 2012.
2. Because Belize could not provide a stadium which met CONCACAF'S minimum standards for the Champions League, the berth normally reserved for Belize was reallocated to Costa Rica, based on the results of the 2012–13 CONCACAF Champions League.
3. No final round was played in the 2013 CFU Club Championship. W Connection and Valencia, the two first round group winners, and Caledonia AIA, the playoff round winner between the two first round group runners-up, qualified for the 2013–14 CONCACAF Champions League.

== Draw ==
The draw for the group stage was held on June 3, 2013 at Doral, Florida, United States.

The 24 teams were drawn into eight groups of three, with each group containing one team from each of the three pots. The allocation of teams into pots was based on their national association and qualifying berth. Teams from the same association (excluding "wildcard" teams which replace a team from another association) could not be drawn with each other in the group stage, and each group was guaranteed to contain a team from either the United States or Mexico, meaning U.S. and Mexican teams could not play each other in the group stage.

Pot A
(Mexico) Tijuana	(Mexico) América	(United States) LA Galaxy	(United States) San Jose Earthquakes
(Costa Rica) Herediano	(Honduras) Olimpia	(Guatemala) Comunicaciones	(Panama) Árabe Unido
Pot B
(Mexico) Toluca	(Mexico) Cruz Azul	(United States) Houston Dynamo	(United States) Sporting Kansas City
(Costa Rica) Alajuelense	(Honduras) Victoria	(El Salvador) Isidro Metapán	(Canada) Montreal Impact
Pot C
(Guatemala) Heredia	(El Salvador) Luis Ángel Firpo	(Panama) Sporting San Miguelito	(Nicaragua) Real Estelí
(Costa Rica) Cartaginés	(Trinidad and Tobago) W Connection	(Haiti) Valencia	(Trinidad and Tobago) Caledonia AIA

== Schedule ==
The schedule of the competition was as follows.

Round		First leg	Second leg
Group stage	Matchday 1	August 6–8, 2013	
Group stage	Matchday 2	August 20–22, 2013	
Group stage	Matchday 3	August 27–29, 2013	
Group stage	Matchday 4	September 17–19, 2013	
Group stage	Matchday 5	September 24–26, 2013	
Group stage	Matchday 6	October 22–24, 2013	
Championship stage	Quarterfinals	March 10–12, 2014	March 18–20, 2014
Championship stage	Semifinals	April 1, 2014	April 8–9, 2014
Championship stage	Final	April 15, 2014	April 23, 2014

== Group stage ==
In the group stage, each group was played on a home-and-away round-robin basis. The winners of each group advanced to the championship stage.

Tiebreakers

The teams are ranked according to points (3 points for a win, 1 point for a draw, 0 points for a loss). If tied on points, tiebreakers are applied in the following order:

1. Greater number of points earned in matches between the teams concerned
2. Greater goal difference in matches between the teams concerned
3. Greater number of goals scored away from home in matches between the teams concerned
4. Reapply first three criteria if two or more teams are still tied
5. Greater goal difference in all group matches
6. Greater number of goals scored in group matches
7. Greater number of goals scored away in all group matches
8. Drawing of lots

=== Group 1 ===
Team	Pld	W	D	L	GF	GA	GD	Pts	Qualification	ARA	HOU	WCO
(Panama) Árabe Unido	4	3	0	1	7	3	+4	9	Advance to championship stage		1–0	3–1
(United States) Houston Dynamo	4	2	1	1	4	2	+2	7		2–1		2–0
(Trinidad and Tobago) W Connection	4	0	1	3	1	7	−6	1		0–2	0–0	

=== Group 2 ===
Team	Pld	W	D	L	GF	GA	GD	Pts	Qualification	KC	OLI	EST
(United States) Sporting Kansas City	4	2	2	0	5	1	+4	8	Advance to championship stage		0–0	1–1
(Honduras) Olimpia	4	2	1	1	2	2	0	7		0–2		1–0
(Nicaragua) Real Estelí	4	0	1	3	1	5	−4	1		0–2	0–1	

=== Group 3 ===
Team	Pld	W	D	L	GF	GA	GD	Pts	Qualification	CA	HER	VAL
(Mexico) Cruz Azul	4	4	0	0	10	2	+8	12	Advance to championship stage		3–0	3–0
(Costa Rica) Herediano	4	2	0	2	11	8	+3	6		1–2		4–2
(Haiti) Valencia	4	0	0	4	4	15	−11	0		1–2	1–6	

=== Group 4 ===
Team	Pld	W	D	L	GF	GA	GD	Pts	Qualification	ALA	AME	SM
(Costa Rica) Alajuelense	4	3	0	1	4	1	+3	9	Advance to championship stage		1–0	2–0
(Mexico) América	4	2	0	2	4	2	+2	6		0–1		3–0
(Panama) Sporting San Miguelito	4	1	0	3	1	6	−5	3		1–0	0–1	

=== Group 5 ===
Team	Pld	W	D	L	GF	GA	GD	Pts	Qualification	SJ	MTL	HER
(United States) San Jose Earthquakes	4	2	0	2	4	2	+2	6 (Note: All three teams are tied on points, and so are ranked by overall goal difference, then overall goals scored.)	Advance to championship stage		3–0	1–0
(Canada) Montreal Impact	4	2	0	2	3	4	−1	6		1–0		2–0
(Guatemala) Heredia	4	2	0	2	2	3	−1	6		1–0	1–0	

=== Group 6 ===
Team	Pld	W	D	L	GF	GA	GD	Pts	Qualification	TOL	COM	CAL
(Mexico) Toluca	4	4	0	0	15	4	+11	12	Advance to championship stage		5–1	3–1
(Guatemala) Comunicaciones	4	2	0	2	7	7	0	6		1–2		2–0
(Trinidad and Tobago) Caledonia AIA	4	0	0	4	2	13	−11	0		1–5	0–3	

=== Group 7 ===
Team	Pld	W	D	L	GF	GA	GD	Pts	Qualification	TIJ	FIR	VIC
(Mexico) Tijuana	4	3	1	0	10	2	+8	10	Advance to championship stage		1–0	6–0
(El Salvador) Luis Ángel Firpo	4	2	1	1	6	3	+3	7		0–0		2–1
(Honduras) Victoria	4	0	0	4	4	15	−11	0		2–3	1–4	

=== Group 8 ===
Team	Pld	W	D	L	GF	GA	GD	Pts	Qualification	LA	CAR	MET
(United States) LA Galaxy	4	3	0	1	6	4	+2	9	Advance to championship stage		2–0	1–0
(Costa Rica) Cartaginés	4	1	1	2	4	7	−3	4 (Note: Cartaginés and Isidro Metapán are ranked on head-to-head record.)		0–3		0–0
(El Salvador) Isidro Metapán	4	1	1	2	6	5	+1	4		4–0	2–4	

== Championship stage ==
In the championship stage, the eight teams played a single-elimination tournament. Each tie was played on a home-and-away two-legged basis. The away goals rule was used if the aggregate score was level after normal time of the second leg, but not after extra time, and so a tie was decided by penalty shoot-out if the aggregate score was level after extra time of the second leg.

=== Seeding ===
The qualified teams were seeded 1–8 in the championship stage according to their results in the group stage.

Seed	Team	Pld	W	D	L	GF	GA	GD	Pts
1	(Mexico) Toluca	4	4	0	0	15	4	+11	12
2	(Mexico) Cruz Azul	4	4	0	0	10	2	+8	12
3	(Mexico) Tijuana	4	3	1	0	10	2	+8	10
4	(Panama) Árabe Unido	4	3	0	1	7	3	+4	9
5	(Costa Rica) Alajuelense	4	3	0	1	4	1	+3	9
6	(United States) LA Galaxy	4	3	0	1	6	4	+2	9
7	(United States) Sporting Kansas City	4	2	2	0	5	1	+4	8
8	(United States) San Jose Earthquakes	4	2	0	2	4	2	+2	6

Rules for classification: 1. Points; 2. Goal difference; 3. Goals scored; 4. Away goals scored; 5. Wins; 6. Away wins; 7. Drawing of lots.

=== Bracket ===
The bracket of the championship stage was determined by the seeding as follows:

- Quarterfinals: Seed 1 vs. Seed 8 (QF1), Seed 2 vs. Seed 7 (QF2), Seed 3 vs. Seed 6 (QF3), Seed 4 vs. Seed 5 (QF4), with seeds 1–4 hosting the second leg
- Semifinals: Winner QF1 vs. Winner QF4 (SF1), Winner QF2 vs. Winner QF3 (SF2), with winners QF1 and QF2 hosting the second leg
- Finals: Winner SF1 vs. Winner SF2, with winner SF1 hosting the second leg

Quarterfinals
6	(United States) LA Galaxy	1	2	3
3	(Mexico) Tijuana	0	4	4
7	(United States) Sporting Kansas City	1	1	2
2	(Mexico) Cruz Azul	0	5	5
5	(Costa Rica) Alajuelense	0	2	2
4	(Panama) Árabe Unido	0	0	0
8	(United States) San Jose Earthquakes	1	1	2 (4)
1	(Mexico) Toluca (p)	1	1	2 (5)

Semifinals
3	(Mexico) Tijuana	1	0	1
2	(Mexico) Cruz Azul	0	2	2
5	(Costa Rica) Alajuelense	0	0	0
1	(Mexico) Toluca	1	2	3

Finals
2	(Mexico) Cruz Azul (a)	0	1	1
1	(Mexico) Toluca	0	1	1

=== Quarterfinals ===
Team 1	Agg.	Team 2	1st leg	2nd leg
San Jose Earthquakes (United States)	2–2 (4–5 p)	(Mexico) Toluca	1–1	1–1 (a.e.t.)
Sporting Kansas City (United States)	2–5	(Mexico) Cruz Azul	1–0	1–5
LA Galaxy (United States)	3–4	(Mexico) Tijuana Xolos	1–0	2–4
Alajuelense (Costa Rica)	2–0	(Panama) Árabe Unido	0–0	2–0

=== Semifinals ===
Team 1	Agg.	Team 2	1st leg	2nd leg
Alajuelense (Costa Rica)	0–3	(Mexico) Toluca	0–1	0–2
Tijuana Xolos (Mexico)	1–2	(Mexico) Cruz Azul	1–0	0–2

=== Final ===
Team 1	Agg.	Team 2	1st leg	2nd leg
Cruz Azul (Mexico)	1–1 (a)	(Mexico) Toluca	0–0	1–1

CONCACAF Champions League
2013–14 champion

Cruz Azul
Sixth title

== Awards ==
Award	Player	Team
Golden Ball	(Argentina) Mariano Pavone	(Mexico) Cruz Azul
Golden Boot	(Mexico) Raúl Nava	(Mexico) Toluca
Golden Glove	(Mexico) Alfredo Talavera	(Mexico) Toluca
Fair Play Award	—	(United States) LA Galaxy

== Top goalscorers ==
Rank	Player	Club	Goals
1	(Mexico) Raúl Nava	(Mexico) Toluca	7
2	(Panama) Nicolás Muñoz	(El Salvador) Isidro Metapán	5
2	(Argentina) Mariano Pavone	(Mexico) Cruz Azul	5
4	(Paraguay) Édgar Benítez	(Mexico) Toluca	4
4	(Cameroon) Achille Emaná	(Mexico) Cruz Azul	4
4	(Republic of Ireland) Robbie Keane	(United States) Los Angeles Galaxy	4
7	(United States) Herculez Gomez	(Mexico) Tijuana Xolos	3
7	(Costa Rica) Pablo Herrera	(Costa Rica) Cartaginés	3
7	(Honduras) Jerry Palacios	(Costa Rica) Alajuelense	3
7	(Costa Rica) Anllel Porras	(Costa Rica) Herediano	3
7	(Uruguay) Paolo Suárez	(Guatemala) Comunicaciones	3

== See also ==
- 2014 FIFA Club World Cup
