= Luis Trujillo (Mexican footballer) =

Mexican footballer (born 1993)

Personal information
- Full name: Luis Trujillo Alday
- Date of birth: 3 December 1993 (age 32)
- Place of birth: Tijuana, Baja California, Mexico
- Height: 1.90 m (6 ft 3 in)
- Position: Defender

Youth career
- 2010–2014: Tijuana

Senior career*
Years	Team	Apps	(Gls)
2010–2014	Tijuana	2	(0)
2014–2017	Dorados de Sinaloa	20	(1)
2015–2016	→ Tapachula (loan)	12	(0)
2017–2018	Tuxtla	31	(0)
2018–2020	Coras Nayarit	26	(1)
2020	Los Cabos	0	(0)
2021–2022	Real Potosí	27	(0)
2022	SV Rottenmann	0	(0)
- * Club domestic league appearances and goals

Luis Trujillo Alday (born 3 December 1993) is a Mexican former professional footballer.
