= Laurent Courtois =

French footballer (born 1978)

Personal information
- Date of birth: 11 September 1978 (age 48)
- Place of birth: Lyon, France
- Height: 1.75 m (5 ft 9 in)
- Position: Midfielder

Team information
- Current team: Columbus Crew

Youth career
- 1996–1998: Lyon

Senior career*
| Years | Team | Apps | (Gls) |
| 1998–1999 | Ajaccio | 30 | (5) |
| 1999–2001 | Toulouse | 53 | (4) |
| 2001–2003 | West Ham United | 7 | (0) |
| 2003–2005 | Istres | 74 | (9) |
| 2005–2008 | Levante | 73 | (4) |
| 2008–2011 | Grenoble | 62 | (5) |
| 2011–2013 | Chivas USA | 33 | (3) |
| 2013 | LA Galaxy | 6 | (0) |
| 2014 | LA Galaxy II | 11 | (2) |
| Total | | 349 | (32) |

Managerial career
- 2014: LA Galaxy II (assistant)
- 2022–2024: Columbus Crew 2
- 2024–2025: CF Montréal
- 2026: Columbus Crew (assistant)
- 2026–: Columbus Crew (interim)
- * Club domestic league appearances and goals

Laurent Courtois (French pronunciation: [lɔʁɑ̃ kuʁtwa]; born 11 September 1978) is a French professional football coach and former player who played as a midfielder. He is currently the interim head coach of Major League Soccer club Columbus Crew.

== Club career ==
Laurent Courtois began his career in the youth ranks of top French club Lyon. In the 1998–99 season, he moved to Ajaccio in Ligue 2, where he gained his first experience. After a fine season with Ajaccio, he transferred to Toulouse, where he helped the club gain promotion to Ligue 1. After a successful second season with Toulouse, he was transferred to West Ham United in England. After 18 unsuccessful months, with only seven Premier League appearances, Courtois left England and returned home.

He signed with Istres in January 2003 to restart his career. In two years at the club, he appeared in 74 league matches and scored 9 goals. In 2005, he joined Spanish La Liga side Levante. He remained at the club for three years. In 2008, he returned to France joining Grenoble. He helped the club gain promotion to Ligue 1 during the 2008–09 season.

During the second half of the 2011 Major League Soccer season, Courtois signed with Chivas USA. He was released on 30 June 2013, just a day after scoring a goal against the New England Revolution in a 1–1 draw.

After a brief trial, Courtois signed with Chivas USA's city rivals Los Angeles Galaxy on 19 July 2013.

Courtois made his debut with the LA Galaxy on 20 July 2013 against Vancouver Whitecaps FC.

After signing for the Galaxy's reserve squad as a player/coach, he announced his retirement on 15 August 2014 in order to obtain his coaching credentials from the FFF.

== Coaching career ==
Following his retirement, Courtois returned to France to work with the Lyon Academy that he had developed in. He went back to the United States in 2019 to join the coaching staff with the Columbus Crew Academy. On 28 January 2022, Courtois was named inaugural head coach of Columbus Crew 2 ahead of the first MLS Next Pro season. At the end of the year, he was named as MLS Next Pro Coach of the Year while coaching the club to its first ever championship.

=== CF Montréal ===
On January 8, 2024, Courtois was announced as the head coach of CF Montréal. During his first season in charge of Montréal, the team finished eighth in the Eastern Conference and reached the MLS Playoffs. However, Montréal was eliminated after a penalty shootout loss to Atlanta United.

On 24 March 2025, Courtois was dismissed from his position after a five-game winless start to the season. He became the first manager fired in the 2025 MLS season.

== Personal life ==
Laurent Courtois holds a blue belt in brazilian jiu-jitsu under André Alemão Vasconcellos.

== Managerial statistics ==
As of 24 March 2025

Managerial record by team and tenure
| Team | Nat. | From | To | Record | | | | | | | | Ref |
| Team | Nat. | From | To | G | W | D | L | GF | GA | GD | Win % | Ref |
|---|---|---|---|---|---|---|---|---|---|---|---|---|
| Columbus Crew 2 | (United States) | 28 January 2022 | 8 January 2024 | 59 | 38 | 8 | 13 | 137 | 77 | +60 | 64.41 | |
| CF Montréal | (Canada) | 8 January 2024 | 24 March 2025 | 45 | 12 | 13 | 20 | 58 | 86 | −28 | 26.67 | |
| Career total | | | | 104 | 50 | 21 | 33 | 195 | 163 | +32 | 48.08 | — |
