= Valencia FC (Haiti) =

Haitian football club

- Full name: Valencia Football Club
- Nickname: Vert et Rouge
- Founded: 27 June 1972; 54 years ago
- Ground: Parc Indrich de Four
- Capacity: 2,000
- Manager: Jean Daniel Laurent
- League: Championnat National D2
- 2015: Ligue Haïtienne, 17th (relegated)
Home colours

Valencia Football Club is a professional football club based in Léogâne, Haiti. The club plays in Haiti's top national league, the Ligue Haïtienne.

== History ==
Valencia FC was founded on 27 June 1972. The club won its first national championship in 2012.

Following their league success in 2012, Valencia would make their first appearance in the regional championship, the CONCACAF Champions League (CCL), in 2013, finishing atop their qualification group on April 30, 2013 after a 0–0 draw with Boys' Town F.C. of Jamaica. Valencia would go on to face Cruz Azul of Mexico and C.S. Herediano of Costa Rica in the group stage.

== Honours ==
- Ligue Haïtienne: 1

2012

== International competitions ==
- CONCACAF Champions League: 1 appearance

2013–14 – Group 1 – Lost against (Mexico) Cruz Azul (1–2), & (Costa Rica) Herediano (1–6)

- CFU Club Championship: 1 appearance

2013 – Won Group 2 – Won against (Puerto Rico) Bayamón (1–3), won against (Jamaica) Portmore United (3–4), draw against (Jamaica) Boys' Town; qualified directly to the 2013–14 CONCACAF Champions League
2014 – Bye to Finals, Finals cancelled, did not qualify for 2014–15 CONCACAF Champions League

== Crests ==
The current Valencia FC crest

The former Valencia FC crest

== Players ==
Note: Flags indicate national team as defined under FIFA eligibility rules; some limited exceptions apply. Players may hold more than one non-FIFA nationality.

No.	Pos.	Nation	Player
—	GK	HAI	Geteau Ferdinand
—	GK	HAI	Frandy Montrévil
—	DF	HAI	Mackenzie Duverger
—	DF	HAI	Jean-Robert Jean
—	DF	HAI	Maurice Jean-Dany
—	DF	HAI	Joseph Géraldy

No.	Pos.	Nation	Player
—	DF	HAI	Louisius Nicolas
—	MF	HAI	Chaderson Charlemagne
—	MF	HAI	Joseph Roody
—	FW	HAI	André Amy
—		HAI	Samuel Pompée
