= Raúl Nava =

Mexican footballer (born 1990)

Personal information
- Full name: Raúl Nava López
- Date of birth: September 17, 1990 (age 36)
- Place of birth: Mexico City, Mexico
- Height: 1.85 m (6 ft 1 in)
- Position: Forward

Senior career*
Years	Team	Apps	(Gls)
2006–2008	Atlético Mexiquense	23	(4)
2008–2015	Toluca	92	(13)
2012–2013	→ Tijuana (loan)	10	(0)
2015	→ Mineros de Zacatecas (loan)	4	(0)
2018	Atlante	0	(0)
2018	Deportivo Iztapa	8	(0)

International career
2012	Mexico U-23	1	(0)
- * Club domestic league appearances and goals

Raúl Nava López (born 17 September 1990) is a Mexican former professional footballer.

== Club career ==
=== Toluca F.C. ===
He made his professional debut with Club Toluca in the Apertura 2008 season uprising from the Atlético Mexiquense squad. He scored his first goal in the quarterfinals home game against Tecos UAG. He scored his second goal with Toluca in a match against C.D. Guadalajara. He was awarded best young player of the Apertura 2009 tournament.

=== U-23 International appearances ===
As of 22 February 2012

International appearances
#	Date	Venue	Opponent	Result	Competition
1.	22 February 2012	Ciudad Nezahualcóyotl, Mexico	(Mexico) Toros Neza	4-2	Friendly

== Honours ==
Tijuana

- Liga MX: Apertura 2012

Individual

- Primera División de México Rookie of the Tournament: Apertura 2009
- CONCACAF Champions League Golden Boot: 2013–14
