= 2011 Los Angeles Galaxy season =

American soccer club season

Los Angeles Galaxy
2011 season
- Owner: Philip Anschutz (AEG)
- Coach: Bruce Arena
- Major League Soccer: 1st
- MLS Cup: Winners
- CONCACAF Champions League: Quarterfinals
- U.S. Open Cup: Quarterfinals
- Honda SuperClasico: Won (2–0–0)
- California Clasico: Won (1–0–1)
- Top goalscorer: League: Landon Donovan (12); All: Landon Donovan (13)
- Highest home attendance: 27,000 (three matches)
- Lowest home attendance: 14,458 v Houston Dynamo (May 25, 2011)
- Average home league attendance: 23,051
Home colors	Away colors	Third colors

The 2011 Los Angeles Galaxy season was the club's 17th year of existence as well as their 16th season in Major League Soccer and their 16th consecutive year in the top-flight of American soccer. The Galaxy entered the season as the defending MLS Supporters' Shield titleholders.

Most notably, the Galaxy became the third straight team to win consecutive Supporters' Shields, after D.C. United (2006–07) and Columbus Crew (2008–09). The Galaxy clinched their fourth Shield on October 8, after Seattle Sounders FC lost 0–2 at home to Philadelphia Union. They also won their third MLS Cup, defeating Houston Dynamo 1–0 in the final.

Outside of league play, the Galaxy participated in the CONCACAF Champions League and the U.S. Open Cup, reaching the Quarterfinals in both competitions. Along with these competitive tournaments, the Galaxy played in the friendly-match World Football Challenge, losing to Real Madrid and drawing to Manchester City.

Their record in all competitions (yet excluding their Asia-Pacific tour) was 28–9–11, earning 95/144 points from 48 matches.

== Season summary ==
=== Preseason ===
The Galaxy had a busy month in January, mostly with transfers. On January 10, club striker, and Golden Boot-finalist, Edson Buddle left the Galaxy to sign with second division German club, Ingolstadt 04 through the end of the 2012–13 2. Bundesliga season.

On January 9, 2010, rumors about David Beckham potentially ending his three-and-a-half-year MLS career by signing with Tottenham Hotspur or going on loan with the Premier League club ended. The Galaxy announced that Beckham would be training with Tottenham for two weeks, before joining Los Angeles for the start of pre-season training. The news made it the first time since 2008 that Beckham did not go on an off-season loan to Europe.

=== Regular season ===
==== March ====
"We just did not play well. None of our guys had a good game. That's pretty obvious..."

— Bruce Arena, LA Galaxy Head Coach, following the 4–1 defeat to Real Salt Lake.

The Galaxy opened the MLS regular season with a 0–1 victory over the Sounders at Qwest Field in rainy Seattle on March 15. Second-year midfielder Juninho had the lone goal of the match. Although they were back home at the Home Depot Center for the second match of the season on March 20, the Galaxy once again played in the rain. A rare Southern California rainstorm made for difficult conditions in the 1–1 draw with the New England Revolution. Juninho scored the equalizer for the Galaxy, his second goal of the season – which already matched his goal total from his debut 2010 season. The toughest test of the early season came on March 26 – and the Galaxy failed. Traveling to Rio Tinto Stadium in Sandy, Utah without captain Landon Donovan (who was away on international duty with the USA national team), the Galaxy lost 4–1 to Real Salt Lake. To be fair, Rio Tinto is a difficult venue for any visiting club, as Real hasn't lost at home in nearly two years. The only consolation was seeing Juan Pablo Ángel open his Galaxy goal account in his first start for his new club. Ángel had been suffering from a virus and didn't start the first two matches (though he did come on as a substitute in the second half against the Revolution).

==== April ====
The Galaxy rebounded from the loss to Real Salt Lake with a 1–0 victory over the Philadelphia Union at the Home Depot Center on April 2. Donovan Ricketts and Omar Gonzalez saw their first action of the season after recovering from minor injuries. Leonardo headed in a David Beckham free kick in the 33rd minute for the game's only goal. It was the defender's first goal in a Galaxy shirt. A 53rd minute red card for Chris Birchall meant that the Galaxy had to spend the majority of the second half protecting their narrow lead a man down.

Next up was a 3-games-in-8-days cross-country road trip. To complicate matters, the Galaxy would be without captain Landon Donovan, who did not travel with the club while he nursed a knee injury. The first match of the trip came at RFK Stadium in Washington, D.C., on April 9. Mike Magee nodded in a Beckham corner to give the Galaxy the early lead. But Charlie Davies drew a dubious penalty and converted from the spot himself in the 90th minute to save the draw for D.C. United. The squad traveled to Toronto to take on Toronto FC 4 days later. The fans at BMO Field saw a largely unentertaining affair resulting in a scoreless draw. Most notable from a Galaxy perspective was the sending off of Juninho in stoppage time of the 2nd half. Also, Beckham received his 5th yellow card of the season in the 44th minute. These two events meant that the Galaxy would be without 3/4ths of their preferred midfield (Donovan, Beckham, and Juninho) when they finished their trip on April 17 in Bridgeview, Illinois against the Chicago Fire. Yet it was no problem as the Galaxy won 1–2 behind goals from Chad Barrett and Gonzalez with Miguel López providing the assists on both goals. Although there was one concerning casualty on the Toyota Park field – Leonardo picked up a right knee injury late in the match. It was revealed a couple days later that he tore the ACL and LCL in the knee, and he is expected to miss the remainder of the season. Heading home to LA, the Galaxy had picked up a very respectable 5 points on their travels.

== Squad ==
=== Roster ===
Note: Flags indicate national team as defined under FIFA eligibility rules; some limited exceptions apply. Players may hold more than one non-FIFA nationality.

No.	Pos.	Nation	Player
1	GK	JAM	Donovan Ricketts
2	DF	USA	Todd Dunivant
3	DF	USA	Gregg Berhalter
4	DF	USA	Omar Gonzalez
5	DF	USA	Sean Franklin
6	DF	USA	Frankie Hejduk
7	MF	USA	Jovan Kirovski
8	MF	TRI	Chris Birchall
10	FW	USA	Landon Donovan (captain)
11	FW	USA	Chad Barrett
12	GK	PUR	Josh Saunders
14	FW	IRL	Robbie Keane
15	MF	NZL	Dan Keat
16	MF	USA	Héctor Jiménez
17	FW	USA	Adam Cristman
18	FW	USA	Mike Magee

No.	Pos.	Nation	Player
19	MF	BRA	Juninho (on loan from São Paulo)
20	DF	USA	A. J. DeLaGarza
21	MF	USA	Dustin McCarty
22	DF	BRA	Leonardo (on loan from São Paulo)
23	MF	ENG	David Beckham
24	GK	USA	Brian Perk
25	MF	ARG	Miguel López (on loan from Quilmes)
26	MF	USA	Michael Stephens
27	FW	USA	Bryan Jordan
28	DF	USA	Ryan Thomas
30	MF	URU	Paolo Cardozo
32	FW	USA	Jack McBean
33	DF	USA	Sean Alvarado
55	DF	USA	Joshua Kelly
29	DF	USA	Dasan Robinson

Last updated: August 19, 2011.
Source: LA Galaxy

=== Squad information ===
No.	Nat.	Player	Birthday	At LAG since	Previous club	MLS appearances	MLS goals
Goalkeepers
1	(Jamaica)	Donovan Ricketts	June 7, 1977 (age 49)	2009	(Jamaica) Village United	59	0
12	(Puerto Rico)	Josh Saunders	March 2, 1981 (age 45)	2009	(United States) Miami FC	12	0
24	(United States)	Brian Perk	July 21, 1989 (age 37)	2010	(United States) Philadelphia Union	1	0
Defenders
2	(United States)	Todd Dunivant	December 26, 1980 (age 45)	2009	(Canada) Toronto FC	59	2
3	(United States)	Gregg Berhalter	August 1, 1973 (age 53)	2009	(Germany) 1860 Munich	41	0
4	(United States)	Omar Gonzalez	October 11, 1988 (age 37)	2009	(United States) Maryland Terrapins	62	4
5	(United States)	Sean Franklin	March 21, 1985 (age 41)	2008	(United States) San Fernando Valley Quakes	72	0
6	(United States)	Frankie Hejduk	August 5, 1974 (age 52)	2011	(United States) Columbus Crew	1	0
20	(United States)	A. J. DeLaGarza	November 4, 1987 (age 38)	2009	(United States) Maryland Terrapins	44	2
22	(Brazil)	Leonardo	February 8, 1988 (age 38)	2010	on loan from (Brazil) São Paulo	17	1
28	(United States)	Ryan Thomas	March 20, 1989 (age 37)	2011	(United States) Stanford Cardinal	0	0
55	(United States)	Joshua Kelly	August 31, 1989 (age 37)	2011	(United States) University of California, Riverside	0	0
29	(United States)	Dasan Robinson	June 6, 1984 (age 42)	2011	(Canada) Toronto FC	85	3
Midfielders
7	(United States)	Jovan Kirovski	March 18, 1976 (age 50)	2008	(United States) San Jose Earthquakes	46	6
8	(Trinidad and Tobago)	Chris Birchall	May 5, 1984 (age 42)	2009	(England) Brighton & Hove Albion	38	0
15	(New Zealand)	Dan Keat	September 28, 1987 (age 38)	2011	(New Zealand) Team Wellington	0	0
16	(United States)	Héctor Jiménez	November 3, 1988 (age 37)	2011	(United States) California Golden Bears	0	0
19	(Brazil)	Juninho	January 5, 1989 (age 37)	2010	on loan from (Brazil) São Paulo	31	4
21	(United States)	Dustin McCarty	October 12, 1988 (age 37)	2011	(United States) North Carolina Tar Heels	0	0
23	(England)	David Beckham	May 2, 1975 (age 51)	2007	(Spain) Real Madrid	63	11
25	(Argentina)	Miguel López	June 9, 1988 (age 38)	2011	on loan from (Argentina) Quilmes	5	0
26	(United States)	Michael Stephens	April 3, 1989 (age 37)	2010	(United States) Chicago Fire Premier	25	1
30	(Uruguay)	Paolo Cardozo	June 9, 1989 (age 37)	2011	(Argentina) Quilmes	5	0
Strikers
10	(United States)	Landon Donovan	March 4, 1982 (age 44)	2005	(Germany) Bayer Leverkusen	148	71
11	(United States)	Chad Barrett	April 30, 1985 (age 41)	2011	(Canada) Toronto FC	7	1
14	(Republic of Ireland)	Robbie Keane	July 8, 1980 (age 46)	2011	(England) Tottenham Hotspur	0	0
17	(United States)	Adam Cristman	January 8, 1985 (age 41)	2011	(United States) D.C. United	0	0
18	(United States)	Mike Magee	September 2, 1984 (age 41)	2009	(United States) New York Red Bulls	44	4
27	(United States)	Bryan Jordan	September 13, 1985 (age 40)	2008	(United States) Portland Timbers	37	2
32	(United States)	Jack McBean	December 15, 1994 (age 31)	2011	(United States) IMG Soccer Academy	0	0

Last updated: August 17, 2011.
Source: LA Galaxy

== Transfers ==
=== In ===
Date	Player	Position	Previous club	Fee/notes	Ref
December 15, 2010	(Colombia) Juan Pablo Ángel	FW	(United States) New York Red Bulls	Re-Entry Draft	
December 15, 2010	(United States) Luke Sassano	MF	(United States) New York Red Bulls	Re-Entry Draft, subsequently traded	
December 15, 2010	(United States) Frankie Hejduk	DF	(United States) Sporting Kansas City	Acquired in exchange for Luke Sassano	
January 11, 2011	(United States) Adam Cristman	FW	(United States) D.C. United	Acquired in exchange for a Supplemental Draft pick	
January 13, 2011	(United States) Chad Barrett	FW	(Canada) Toronto F.C.	Acquired in exchange for undisclosed future considerations	
February 14, 2011	(Uruguay) Paolo Cardozo	MF	(Argentina) Quilmes	SuperDraft, 1st round	
February 14, 2011	(United States) Héctor Jiménez	MF	(United States) University of California, Berkeley	SuperDraft, 2nd round	
February 14, 2011	(New Zealand) Dan Keat	MF	(United States) Dartmouth College	Supplemental Draft, 1st round	
February 14, 2011	(United States) Ryan Thomas	DF	(United States) Stanford University	Supplemental Draft, 1st round	
February 14, 2011	(United States) Dustin McCarty	MF	(United States) University of North Carolina	Supplemental Draft, 2nd round	
March 16, 2011	(United States) Sean Alvarado	DF	Unattached	Free	
May 11, 2011	(United States) Kyle Davies	DF	Unattached	Free	
August 15, 2011	(Republic of Ireland) Robbie Keane	FW	(England) Tottenham Hotspur	Undisclosed, believed to be roughly $4M transfer fee	
September 15, 2011	(United States) Dasan Robinson	DF	(Canada) Toronto FC	Acquired for Kyle Davies	

=== Out ===
Date	Player	Position	Destination club	Fee/notes	Ref
November 15, 2010	(United States) Eddie Lewis	MF	None	Retired	
November 15, 2010	(United States) Chris Klein	MF	None	Retired	
December 3, 2010	(Ukraine) Dema Kovalenko	MF	None	Option declined, retired	
December 15, 2010	(United States) Tristan Bowen	FW	(United States) Chivas USA	Traded for allocation money	
December 15, 2010	(United States) Luke Sassano	MF	(United States) Sporting Kansas City	Traded for Frankie Hejduk	
January 1, 2011	(Brazil) Alex Cazumba	MF	(Brazil) São Paulo	Loan expired, option declined	
January 10, 2011	(United States) Edson Buddle	FW	(Germany) Ingolstadt 04	Undisclosed	
January 26, 2011	(Trinidad and Tobago) Yohance Marshall	DF	(United States) Vermont Voltage	Option declined, free transfer	
August 17, 2011	(Colombia) Juan Pablo Ángel	FW	(United States) Chivas USA	Traded for a 2012 Supplemental Draft, 3rd round pick	
September 15, 2011	(United States) Kyle Davies	DF	(Canada) Toronto FC	Traded for Dasan Robinson	

=== Loans ===
==== In ====
Date	Player	Position	Previous club	Fee/notes	Ref
December 23, 2009	(Brazil) Leonardo	DF	(Brazil) São Paulo	Loan	
December 23, 2009	(Brazil) Juninho	MF	(Brazil) São Paulo	Loan	
January 28, 2011	(Argentina) Miguel López	MF	(Argentina) Quilmes	One year loan, terms undisclosed	

== Competitions ==
=== Pre-season ===
February 4, 2011	Loyola Marymount Lions	1–7	LA Galaxy	Carson, California
16:30 PST		Report	Birchall; Ángel; Berhalter; Juninho; Cardozo; Kirovski	Stadium: The Home Depot Center

February 8, 2011	LA Galaxy	1–1	Portland Timbers	Carson, California
15:00 PST	López (red card) 26'; Cardozo 47'	Report	Umony 50'	Stadium: The Home Depot Center

March 2, 2011	LA Galaxy	2–2 (3–4 p)	Tijuana	San Diego, California
	Gonzalez 41'; Donovan 75'	Report	Pulido 39'; Orozco 81'	Stadium: Torero Stadium; Attendance: 6,124
	Penalties
	Donovan (penalty scored); Magee (penalty scored); López (penalty missed); Barrett (penalty scored); Kirovski (penalty missed)		(penalty missed) Rosa; (penalty scored) Molina; (penalty scored) Orozco; (penalty scored) Otreras; (penalty scored) Yacuzzi

=== Major League Soccer ===
==== Overall table ====
Pos	Team	Pld	W	L	T	GF	GA	GD	Pts	Qualification
1	LA Galaxy (S, C)	34	19	5	10	48	28	+20	67	CONCACAF Champions League
2	Seattle Sounders FC	34	18	7	9	56	37	+19	63	CONCACAF Champions League
3	Real Salt Lake	34	15	11	8	44	36	+8	53	CONCACAF Champions League
4	FC Dallas	34	15	12	7	42	39	+3	52	
5	Sporting Kansas City	34	13	9	12	50	40	+10	51	
6	Houston Dynamo	34	12	9	13	45	41	+4	49	CONCACAF Champions League
7	Colorado Rapids	34	12	9	13	44	41	+3	49	
8	Philadelphia Union	34	11	8	15	44	36	+8	48	
9	Columbus Crew	34	13	13	8	43	44	−1	47	
10	New York Red Bulls	34	10	8	16	50	44	+6	46	
11	Chicago Fire	34	9	9	16	46	45	+1	43	
12	Portland Timbers	34	11	14	9	40	48	−8	42	
13	D.C. United	34	9	13	12	49	52	−3	39	
14	San Jose Earthquakes	34	8	12	14	40	45	−5	38	
15	Chivas USA	34	8	14	12	41	43	−2	36	
16	Toronto FC	34	6	13	15	36	59	−23	33	CONCACAF Champions League
17	New England Revolution	34	5	16	13	38	58	−20	28	
18	Vancouver Whitecaps FC	34	6	18	10	35	55	−20	28	

Source: MLS
Rules for classification: 1) points; 2) head-to-head record; 3) goal difference; 4) number of goals scored
(C) Champions; (S) Supporters' Shield

==== Western Conference table ====
Pos	Team	Pld	W	L	T	GF	GA	GD	Pts	Qualification
1	LA Galaxy	34	19	5	10	48	28	+20	67	MLS Cup Conference Semifinals
2	Seattle Sounders FC	34	18	7	9	56	37	+19	63	MLS Cup Conference Semifinals
3	Real Salt Lake	34	15	11	8	44	36	+8	53	MLS Cup Conference Semifinals
4	FC Dallas	34	15	12	7	42	39	+3	52	MLS Cup Play-In Round
5	Colorado Rapids	34	12	9	13	46	42	+4	49	MLS Cup Play-In Round
6	Portland Timbers	34	11	14	9	40	48	−8	42	
7	San Jose Earthquakes	34	8	12	14	40	45	−5	38	
8	Chivas USA	34	8	14	12	41	43	−2	36	
9	Vancouver Whitecaps FC	34	6	18	10	35	55	−20	28	

Source: MLS

==== Results summary ====
Overall								Home						Away					
Pld	W	D	L	GF	GA	GD	Pts	W	D	L	GF	GA	GD	W	D	L	GF	GA	GD
32	18	10	4	46	25	+21	64	11	5	0	27	8	+19	7	5	4	19	17	+2

Last updated: October 9, 2011.
Source: Match results

==== Results by round ====
Round	1	2	3	4	5	6	7	8	9	10	11	12	13	14	15	16	17	18	19	20	21	22	23	24	25	26	27	28	29	30	31	32	33	34
Stadium	A	H	A	H	A	A	A	H	A	H	A	H	A	H	A	H	H	A	A	H	H	H	A	A	H	H	A	H	H	A	H	A	H	A
Result	W	D	L	W	D	D	W	W	L	D	D	W	W	W	W	D	D	W	D	D	W	W	W	L	W	W	D	W	W	W	W	L	W	L

Updated to match(es) played on October 9, 2011. Source: Match results
A = Away; H = Home; W = Win; D = Draw; L = Loss

==== Match results ====
Win Tie Loss

March 15, 2011 1	Seattle Sounders FC	0–1	LA Galaxy	Seattle
19:00 PDT	Friberg (yellow card) 44'; González (yellow card) 45+1'	Report	Birchall (yellow card) 24'; Juninho 58'; Beckham (yellow card) 90+3'	Stadium: Qwest Field; Attendance: 36,443; Referee: Alex Prus

March 20, 2011 2	LA Galaxy	1–1	New England Revolution	Carson, California
15:00 PDT	Juninho 39'	Report	Joseph 3'	Stadium: The Home Depot Center; Attendance: 27,000; Referee: Hilario Grajeda

March 26, 2011 3	Real Salt Lake	4–1	LA Galaxy	Sandy, Utah
18:00 PDT	Williams 2'; Morales 10' (pen.), 41'; Paulo Jr. 68'	Report	Saunders (yellow card) 9'; Beckham (yellow card) 54'; López (yellow card) 54'; Leonardo (yellow card) 74'; Ángel 80'	Stadium: Rio Tinto Stadium; Attendance: 20,507; Referee: Jair Marrufo

April 2, 2011 4	LA Galaxy	1–0	Philadelphia Union	Carson, California
19:30 PDT	Leonardo 33'; López (yellow card) 51'; Birchall (red card) 53'; Ricketts (yellow card) 60'; Beckham (yellow card) 89'; Donovan (yellow card) 90+2'	Report	Ruiz (yellow card) 53'; Williams (yellow card) 63'; Harvey (yellow card) 78'; Califf (yellow card) 88'; McInerney (red card) 90+5'	Stadium: The Home Depot Center; Attendance: 24,998; Referee: Paul Ward

April 9, 2011 5	D.C. United	1–1	LA Galaxy	Washington, D.C.
16:30 PDT	Quaranta (yellow card) 40' (red card) 84'; Davies 90'	Report	Magee 12'; Dunivant (yellow card) 29'; Beckham (yellow card) 41'; Kirovski (red card) 90+5'	Stadium: RFK Stadium; Attendance: 26,622; Referee: Abiodun Okulaja

April 13, 2011 6	Toronto FC	0–0	LA Galaxy	Toronto
17:00 PDT	Martina (yellow card) 67'; Stevanović (yellow card) 68'	Report	Bechkam (yellow card) 44'; Jordan (yellow card) 76'; Juninho (yellow card) 78' (red card) 90+3'	Stadium: BMO Field; Attendance: 22,453; Referee: Terry Vaughn

April 17, 2011 7	Chicago Fire	1–2	LA Galaxy	Bridgeview, Illinois
13:00 PDT	Videira (yellow card) 10'; Oduro 89', (yellow card) 90+3'	Report	Magee (yellow card) 31'; Barrett 42'; Stephens (yellow card) 63'; Gonzalez 72'; Hejduk (yellow card) 73'	Stadium: Toyota Park; Attendance: 18,203; Referee: Edvin Jurisevic

April 23, 2011 8	LA Galaxy	3–0	Portland Timbers	Carson, California
20:00 PDT	Barrett 3'; Donovan 8' (pen.), 67'; Franklin (yellow card) 17'; Magee (yellow card) 90+1'	Report	Wallace (yellow card) 7'	Stadium: The Home Depot Center; Attendance: 23,719; Referee: Ramón Hernández

May 1, 2011 9	FC Dallas	2–1	LA Galaxy	Frisco, Texas
16:00 PDT	Castillo 47'; Shea 88'	Report	Donovan 51'; Juninho (yellow card) 55'	Stadium: Pizza Hut Park; Attendance: 21,867; Referee: Alex Prus

May 7, 2011 10	LA Galaxy	1–1	New York Red Bulls	Carson, California
20:00 PDT	Donovan 41'	Report	Henry 4'; Rodgers (yellow card) 57'	Stadium: The Home Depot Center; Attendance: 27,000; Referee: Edvin Jurisevic

May 11, 2011 11	Philadelphia Union	1–1	LA Galaxy	Chester, Pennsylvania
16:30 PDT	Caroll (yellow card) 58'; Torres (yellow card) 76'; Mwanga 83', (yellow card) 83'; Williams (yellow card) 90+2'	Report	Donovan 24'; Birchall (yellow card) 30'; Gonzalez (yellow card) 78'; DeLaGarza (yellow card) 87'	Stadium: PPL Park; Attendance: 19,178; Referee: Andrew Chapin

May 14, 2011 12	LA Galaxy	4–1	Sporting Kansas City	Carson, California
19:30 PDT	Donovan 44' (pen.), 46'; Ángel 64'; Juninho (yellow card) 80'; Beckham 87'	Report	Gonzalez 39' (o.g.)	Stadium: The Home Depot Center; Attendance: 19,763; Referee: Baldomero Toledo

May 21, 2011 13	Chivas USA	0–1	LA Galaxy	Carson, California
19:00 PDT	Elliot (yellow card) 50'; Valentin (yellow card) 73'	Report	Barrett 26'	Stadium: The Home Depot Center; Attendance: 27,000; Referee: Jair Marrufo

May 25, 2011 14	LA Galaxy	1–0	Houston Dynamo	Carson, California
19:30 PDT	Donovan 46' (pen.); Franklin (yellow card) 87'	Report	Watson (yellow card) 90'	Stadium: The Home Depot Center; Attendance: 14,458; Referee: Chris Penso

May 28, 2011 15	New England Revolution	0–1	LA Galaxy	Foxborough, Massachusetts
17:00 PDT		Report	Beckham (yellow card) 67'; López 69'	Stadium: Gillette Stadium; Attendance: 21,793; Referee: Jorge Gonzalez

June 3, 2011 16	LA Galaxy	0–0	D.C. United	Carson, California
20:00 PDT	Gonzalez (yellow card) 42'	Report	Fred (yellow card) 6'; White (yellow card) 65'	Stadium: The Home Depot Center; Attendance: 20,036; Referee: Silviu Petrescu

June 11, 2011 17	LA Galaxy	2–2	Toronto FC	Carson, California
19:30 PDT	Birchall 2'; Beckham (yellow card) 29'; DeLaGarza (yellow card) 83'; Ángel 90+1'	Report	Borman (yellow card) 17'; Henry (yellow card) 57'; Gordon 68', 90+4' (yellow card) 81'	Stadium: The Home Depot Center; Attendance: 20,675; Referee: Mark Kadlecik

June 18, 2011 18	Colorado Rapids	1–3	LA Galaxy	Commerce City, Colorado
18:00 PDT	Nyassi (yellow card) 36'; Casey 64'; Folan (red card) 74'; Mastroeni (yellow card) 81'	Report	Moor 25' (o.g.); Juninho 42'; Barrett 80'	Stadium: Dick's Sporting Goods Park; Attendance: 18,277; Referee: Daniel Fitzgerald

June 25, 2011 19	San Jose Earthquakes	0–0	LA Galaxy	Santa Clara, California
20:00 PDT	Lenhart (yellow card) 43'; Corrales (yellow card) 49'	Report	Dunivant (yellow card) 37'; Saunders (red card) 43'	Stadium: Buck Shaw Stadium; Attendance: 10,872; Referee: Juan Guzman

July 4, 2011 20	LA Galaxy	0–0	Seattle Sounders FC	Carson, California
19:30 PDT	Donovan (yellow card) 90+4'	Report	Friberg (yellow card) 55'	Stadium: The Home Depot Center; Attendance: 27,000; Referee: Ricardo Salazar

July 9, 2011 21	LA Galaxy	2–1	Chicago Fire	Carson, California
19:30 PDT	Donovan 58'; Beckham 65'; Birchall (yellow card) 90+2'	Report	Paladini (yellow card) 64'; Nazarit 62'; Cháves (yellow card) 90+1'; Mikulić (red card) 90+5'	Stadium: The Home Depot Center; Attendance: 21,762; Referee: David Ganter

July 20, 2011 22	LA Galaxy	1–0	Columbus Crew	Carson, California
19:30 PDT	Berhalter (yellow card) 16'; Franklin 70'; Juninho (yellow card) 85'; Beckham (yellow card) 90+2'	Report	James (yellow card) 65'	Stadium: The Home Depot Center; Attendance: 24,709; Referee: Andrew Chapin

July 30, 2011 23	Vancouver Whitecaps FC	0–4	LA Galaxy	Vancouver, BC
16:30 PDT		Report	Donovan 61', 75' (pen.); Stephens (yellow card) 65'; Franklin 80'; Cristman 90'	Stadium: Empire Field; Attendance: 27,500; Referee: Baldomero Toledo

August 3, 2011 24	Portland Timbers	3–0	LA Galaxy	Portland, Oregon
20:00 PDT	Chabala 26'; Perlaza 33'; Brunner 68'; Chará (yellow card) 82'; Zizzo (yellow card) 89'	Report	Donovan (yellow card) 64'	Stadium: Jeld-Wen Field; Attendance: 18,627; Referee: Mark Kadlecik

August 6, 2011 25	LA Galaxy	3–1	FC Dallas	Carson, California
19:30 PDT	Beckham (yellow card) 25'; Gonzalez 32'; Berhalter (yellow card) 35'; Juninho 62'; Magee 81'; Stephens (yellow card) 90+4'	Report	Chávez 9' (yellow card) 68'; Villar (yellow card) 18'; Benítez (yellow card) 27'	Stadium: The Home Depot Center; Attendance: 21,546; Referee: Michael Kennedy

August 20, 2011 26	LA Galaxy	2–0	San Jose Earthquakes	Carson, California
19:30 PDT	Keane 21'; Hejduk (yellow card) 68'; Magee 90'	Report	Baca (yellow card) 54'; Beitashour (red card) 81'	Stadium: The Home Depot Center; Attendance: 27,000; Referee: Alejandro Mariscal

September 5, 2011 27	Sporting Kansas City	2–2	LA Galaxy	Kansas City, Kansas
15:00 PDT	Espinoza (yellow card) 2'; Zusi (yellow card) 67'; Júlio César 72'; Collin (yellow card) 73'; Bravo 90+2' (pen.)	Report	Franklin 25', 74'; Hejduk (yellow card) 66'; Donovan (yellow card) 84'; Beckham (yellow card) 90+1'	Stadium: Livestrong Sporting Park; Attendance: 20,512; Referee: Ricardo Salazar

September 9, 2011 28	LA Galaxy	1–0	Colorado Rapids	Carson, California
20:00 PDT	Donovan 36'	Report	Mullan (yellow card) 67'	Stadium: The Home Depot Center; Attendance: 20,068; Referee: Kevin Stott

September 17, 2011 29	LA Galaxy	3–0	Vancouver Whitecaps FC	Carson, California
19:30 PDT	Magee 40' 75'; Keane 64'	Report	Rochat (yellow card) 17'; Koffie (yellow card) 28'; Hassli (yellow card) 62'	Stadium: The Home Depot Center; Attendance: 22,959; Referee: Michael Kennedy

September 24, 2011 30	Columbus Crew	0–1	LA Galaxy	Columbus, Ohio
16:30 PDT		Report	Barrett 90+3'	Stadium: Crew Stadium; Attendance: 21,203; Referee: Silviu Petrescu

October 1, 2011 31	LA Galaxy	2–1	Real Salt Lake	Carson, California
19:30 PDT	Barrett 59'; Borchers 72' (o.g.)	Report	Espíndola 10'	Stadium: The Home Depot Center; Attendance: 27,000; Referee: Kevin Stott

October 4, 2011 32	New York Red Bulls	2–0	LA Galaxy	Harrison, New Jersey
17:00 PDT	Rodgers 32'; Henry 59'	Report		Stadium: Red Bull Arena; Attendance: 25,186; Referee: Jair Marrufo

October 16, 2011 33	LA Galaxy	1–0	Chivas USA	Carson, California
18:00 PDT	Barrett 53'	Report		Stadium: The Home Depot Center; Attendance: 27,000; Referee: Jair Marrufo

October 23, 2011 34	Houston Dynamo	3–1	LA Galaxy	Houston, Texas
16:00 PDT	Moffat 27'; Boswell 48'; Costly 74'	Report	McBean 88'	Stadium: Robertson Stadium; Attendance: 30,018; Referee: Jorge Gonzalez

=== MLS Cup Playoffs ===
==== Conference semifinals ====
October 30, 2011 First Leg	New York Red Bulls	0–1	LA Galaxy	Harrison, New Jersey
12:00 PDT	Henry (yellow card) 44'	Report	Magee 15'; Franklin (yellow card) 40'	Stadium: Red Bull Arena; Attendance: 22,663; Referee: Alex Prus

November 3, 2011 Second Leg	LA Galaxy	2–1 (3–1 agg.)	New York Red Bulls	Carson, California
20:00 PDT	Magee 42'; Donovan 75' (pen.)	Report	Rodgers 4'	Stadium: The Home Depot Center; Attendance: 20,000; Referee: Hilario Grajeda

==== Conference finals ====
November 6, 2011	LA Galaxy	3–1	Real Salt Lake	The Home Depot Center; Carson, California
18:00 PST	Donovan 23' (pen.); Magee 58'; Keane 68'	Report	Saborío 25'	Attendance: 23,437; Referee: Jorge Gonzalez

==== Championship ====
November 20, 2011	LA Galaxy	1–0	Houston Dynamo	The Home Depot Center; Carson, California
18:00 PST	Donovan 72'			Attendance: 30,281; Referee: Ricardo Salazar

=== CONCACAF Champions League ===
The Los Angeles Galaxy qualified directly into Group stage play by winning the Supporters' Shield. The Galaxy played in Group A with Alajuelense of Costa Rica, Morelia of Mexico, and Motagua of Honduras.

==== Group A Table ====
Team	Pld	W	D	L	GF	GA	GD	Pts	Qualification	LA	MOR	ALA	MOT
(United States) Los Angeles Galaxy	6	4	0	2	8	4	+4	12 (Note: Tiebreakers: Los Angeles Galaxy, Morelia and Alajuelense are ranked by their head-to-head records.)	Advance to championship round		2–1	2–0	2–0
(Mexico) Morelia	6	4	0	2	11	5	+6	12	Advance to championship round	2–1		2–1	4–0
(Costa Rica) Alajuelense	6	4	0	2	8	6	+2	12		1–0	1–0		1–0
(Honduras) Motagua	6	0	0	6	2	14	−12	0		0–1	0–2	2–4	

==== Group Stage Matches ====
August 16, 2011 1	LA Galaxy (United States)	2–0	(Honduras) Motagua	Carson
20:00 PDT	Cristman 13'; Donovan 60'; Berhalter (yellow card) 90'	Report	Guerrero (red card) 70'	Stadium: The Home Depot Center; Attendance: 8,196; Referee: Enrico Wijngaarde (Suriname)

August 25, 2011 2	LA Galaxy (United States)	2–0	(Costa Rica) Alajuelense	Carson
20:00 PDT	Beckham (yellow card) 31'; Gonzalez 38'; Donovan (yellow card) 68'; Barrett 77'; Magee (yellow card) 77'; Juninho (red card) 88'	Report	Acosta (yellow card) 60'	Stadium: The Home Depot Center; Attendance: 9,855; Referee: Marco Antonio Rodríguez (Mexico)

September 13, 2011 3	Morelia (Mexico)	2–1	(United States) LA Galaxy	Morelia, Mexico
16:00 PDT	Aldrete 83'; Sabah 90+2' (yellow card) 90+3'	Report	Keane 52'	Stadium: Estadio Morelos; Referee: José Pineda (Honduras)

September 21, 2011 4	Alajuelense (Costa Rica)	1–0	(United States) LA Galaxy	Alajuela, Costa Rica
18:00 PDT	Antonio Gabas 28'	Report		Stadium: Estadio Alejandro Morera Soto; Referee: Courtney Campbell (Jamaica)

September 28, 2011 5	LA Galaxy (United States)	2–1	(Mexico) Morelia	Carson
22:00	Magee 21'; Juninho 90'	Report	Lugo 59'	Stadium: The Home Depot Center; Referee: Joel Aguilar (El Salvador)

October 20, 2011 6	Motagua (Honduras)	0–1	(United States) LA Galaxy	Tegucigalpa, Honduras
16:00 PDT		Report	Juninho 29'	Stadium: Estadio Tiburcio Carías Andino; Attendance: 14,000; Referee: Walter López (Guatemala)

=== U.S. Open Cup ===
June 28, 2011 Third round	LA Galaxy (California)	2–1	(California) Los Angeles Blues	Fullerton, California
19:30 PDT	Berhalter (yellow card) 8'; Gonzalez 75'; Magee 81'; Cristman (yellow card) 88'	Report	Tudela (yellow card) 1'; Rivera 62'; Momeni (yellow card) 70'; Sesay (yellow card) 90' (red card) 90'	Stadium: Titan Stadium; Attendance: 3,627; Referee: Alejandro Mariscal

July 13, 2011 Quarterfinals	Seattle Sounders FC (Washington (state))	3–1	(California) LA Galaxy	Tukwila, Washington
19:00 PDT	Jaqua 4'; Alonso (yellow card) 22'; Montero 25' (yellow card) 54'; Parke (yellow card) 55'; Neagle 74'; Fucito (yellow card) 90'	Report	Cristman 40'; Cardozo (yellow card) 59'	Stadium: Starfire Sports Complex; Attendance: 4,322; Referee: Kevin Stott

=== World Football Challenge ===
July 16, 2011	LA Galaxy (United States)	1–4	(Spain) Real Madrid	Los Angeles, California
19:00 PDT	López (yellow card) 38'; Cristman 67'	Report	Callejón 31'; Joselu 40'; Ronaldo 53'; Benzema 58'	Stadium: Los Angeles Memorial Coliseum; Attendance: 56,211; Referee: Jorge González

July 24, 2011	LA Galaxy (United States)	1–1 (6–7 p)	(England) Manchester City	Carson, California
13:00 PDT	Magee 53'	Report	Balotelli 20' (pen.); Savić (yellow card) 67'	Stadium: The Home Depot Center; Attendance: 24,897; Referee: Ricardo Salazar
	Penalties
	Keat (penalty scored); Birchall (penalty scored); Juninho (penalty missed); Dunivant (penalty scored); Stephens (penalty scored); McBean (penalty missed); Gonzalez (penalty scored); McCarty (penalty scored); DeLaGarza (penalty missed)		(penalty scored) Milner; (penalty scored) Weiss; (penalty scored) Suárez; (penalty scored) Kolarov; (penalty missed) Guidetti; (penalty missed) Lescott; (penalty scored) De Jong; (penalty scored) Wright-Phillips; (penalty scored) Hart

=== Asia Pacific Tour 2011 ===
November 30, 2011	Indonesia Selection	0–1	(United States) LA Galaxy	Jakarta, Indonesia
04:00 PST		Report	Keane 14' (yellow card) 24'; Gonzalez (yellow card) 20'; Magee (yellow card) 26'	Stadium: Bung Karno Stadium; Attendance: 20,000; Referee: Faulur Rosy

December 3, 2011	Philippines	1–6	(United States) LA Galaxy	Manila, Philippines
03:30 PST	P. Younghusband 41' (yellow card) 48'; De Jong (yellow card) 64'	Report	Beckham 20'; Magee 39'; Keane 47'; Cristman 63', 87'; Berhalter 81' (pen.)	Stadium: Rizal Memorial Stadium; Attendance: 9,000; Referee: Jovanie Villagracia

December 6, 2011	Melbourne Victory FC (Australia)	2–2 (3–4 p)	(United States) LA Galaxy	Melbourne, Australia
00:30 PST	Hernández 15'; Cernak 37'	Report	Keane 43' (pen.), 50' (pen.)	Stadium: Etihad Stadium; Attendance: 34,608; Referee: Strebre Delovski
	Penalties
	Vargas (penalty scored); Jeggo (penalty scored); Pondeljak (penalty scored); Retre (penalty missed); Rojas (penalty missed)		Donovan (penalty missed); Jiménez (penalty scored); Berhlater (penalty scored); Stephens (penalty scored); Cardozo (penalty scored)

== Statistics ==
All statistics are for competitive matches only.

=== Appearances and goals ===
No.	Pos	Nat	Player	Total		MLS		Champions League		Open Cup	
No.	Pos	Nat	Player	Apps	Goals	Apps	Goals	Apps	Goals	Apps	Goals
1	GK	(Jamaica) JAM	Donovan Ricketts	12	0	12+0	0	0+0	0	0+0	0
2	DF	(United States) USA	Todd Dunivant	29	0	26+0	0	2+0	0	1+0	0
3	DF	(United States) USA	Gregg Berhalter	12	0	6+2	0	2+0	0	2+0	0
4	DF	(United States) USA	Omar Gonzalez	25	4	22+0	2	2+0	1	1+0	1
5	DF	(United States) USA	Sean Franklin	28	2	23+2	2	1+1	0	1+0	0
6	DF	(United States) USA	Frankie Hejduk	2	0	2+0	0	0+0	0	0+0	0
7	FW	(United States) USA	Jovan Kirovski	11	0	1+8	0	0+0	0	1+1	0
8	MF	(Trinidad and Tobago) TRI	Chris Birchall	22	1	14+5	1	0+2	0	1+0	0
9	FW	(Colombia) COL	Juan Pablo Ángel	22	3	17+5	3	0+0	0	0+0	0
10	FW	(United States) USA	Landon Donovan	21	12	18+0	11	2+0	1	1+0	0
11	FW	(United States) USA	Chad Barrett	22	5	15+5	4	0+1	1	1+0	0
12	GK	(Puerto Rico) PUR	Josh Saunders	17	0	13+1	0	2+0	0	1+0	0
14	FW	(Republic of Ireland) IRL	Robbie Keane	2	1	1+0	1	1+0	0	0+0	0
15	MF	(New Zealand) NZL	Dan Keat	3	0	0+3	0	0+0	0	0+0	0
16	MF	(United States) USA	Héctor Jiménez	1	0	0+0	0	0+0	0	0+1	0
17	FW	(United States) USA	Adam Cristman	10	3	2+4	1	2+0	1	1+1	1
18	MF	(United States) USA	Mike Magee	25	4	17+5	3	2+0	0	1+0	1
19	MF	(Brazil) BRA	Juninho	28	4	24+0	4	2+0	0	1+1	0
20	DF	(United States) USA	A. J. DeLaGarza	26	0	22+0	0	2+0	0	2+0	0
21	MF	(United States) USA	Dustin McCarty	0	0	0+0	0	0+0	0	0+0	0
22	DF	(Brazil) BRA	Leonardo	7	1	7+0	1	0+0	0	0+0	0
23	MF	(England) ENG	David Beckham	34	2	26+4	2+0	4	0	0+0	0
24	GK	(United States) USA	Brian Perk	2	0	1+0	0	0+0	0	1+0	0
25	MF	(Argentina) ARG	Miguel López	24	1	12+9	1	0+1	0	0+2	0
26	MF	(United States) USA	Michael Stephens	20	0	10+7	0	0+1	0	2+0	0
27	FW	(United States) USA	Bryan Jordan	10	0	1+7	0	0+0	0	2+0	0
28	DF	(United States) USA	Ryan Thomas	0	0	0+0	0	0+0	0	0+0	0
30	MF	(Uruguay) URU	Paolo Cardozo	13	0	2+9	0	0+0	0	2+0	0
32	FW	(United States) USA	Jack McBean	0	0	0+0	0	0+0	0	0+0	0
33	DF	(United States) USA	Sean Alvarado	0	0	0+0	0	0+0	0	0+0	0

Updated to match played August 25, 2011
Source: LA Galaxy

=== Goalkeeper stats ===
No.	Nat.	Player	Total			MLS			Champions League			Open Cup		
No.	Nat.	Player	MIN	GA	GAA	MIN	GA	GAA	MIN	GA	GAA	MIN	GA	GAA
1	(Jamaica)	Donovan Ricketts	1014	6	0.53	1014	6	0.53	0	0	0.00	0	0	0.00
12	(Puerto Rico)	Josh Saunders	1459	17	1.05	1189	14	1.06	180	0	0.00	90	3	3.00
18	(United States)	Mike Magee	47	0	0.00	47	0	0.00	0	0	0.00	0	0	0.00
24	(United States)	Brian Perk	180	1	0.50	90	0	0.00	0	0	0.00	90	1	1.00
		TOTALS	2700	24	0.80	2340	20	0.77	180	0	0.00	180	4	2.00

Updated to match played August 25, 2011
Source: LA Galaxy

=== Starting XI ===
MLS regular season matches only.

No.	Pos.	Nat.	Name	MS	Notes
12	GK	(Puerto Rico)	Saunders	18	
5	RB	(United States)	Franklin	25	Also played as RM
4	CB	(United States)	Gonzalez	29	
20	CB	(United States)	DeLaGarza	30	
2	LB	(United States)	Dunivant	32	
10	RM	(United States)	Donovan	21	
23	CM	(England)	Beckham	25	
19	CM	(Brazil)	Juninho	30	
18	LM	(United States)	Magee	20	Also played as FW
9	FW	(Colombia)	Ángel	17	
11	FW	(United States)	Barrett	20	

Updated to match played November 27, 2011
Source: LA Galaxy

=== Top scorers ===
Rank	Nation	Number	Name	Total	MLS	Champions League	Open Cup
1	(United States)	10	Landon Donovan	13	12	1	0
2	(United States)	11	Chad Barrett	5	4	1	0
3	(United States)	5	Sean Franklin	4	4	0	0
3	(United States)	4	Omar Gonzalez	4	2	1	1
3	(Brazil)	19	Juninho	4	4	0	0
3	(United States)	18	Mike Magee	4	3	0	1
3	(Colombia)	9	Juan Pablo Ángel	4	4	0	0
8	(United States)	17	Adam Cristman	3	1	1	1
9	(England)	23	David Beckham	2	2	0	0
10	(Trinidad and Tobago)	8	Chris Birchall	1	1	0	0
10	(Republic of Ireland)	14	Robbie Keane	1	1	0	0
10	(Brazil)	22	Leonardo	1	1	0	0
10	(Argentina)	25	Miguel López	1	1	0	0

Updated to match played September 9, 2011
Source: LA Galaxy

=== Top assists ===
Rank	Nation	Number	Name	Total	MLS	Champions League	Open Cup
1	(England)	23	David Beckham	14	12	2	0
2	(United States)	11	Chad Barrett	3	3	0	0
2	(United States)	10	Landon Donovan	3	3	0	0
2	(United States)	5	Sean Franklin	3	2	1	0
2	(Argentina)	25	Miguel López	3	2	0	0
6	(United States)	2	Todd Dunivant	2	2	0	0
6	(Brazil)	19	Juninho	2	1	0	1
8	(Colombia)	9	Juan Pablo Ángel	1	1	0	0
8	(United States)	3	Gregg Berhalter	1	1	0	0
8	(Trinidad and Tobago)	8	Chris Birchall	1	0	0	1
8	(United States)	20	A. J. DeLaGarza	1	0	1	0
8	(United States)	4	Omar Gonzalez	1	0	0	1

Updated to match played August 25, 2011
Source: LA Galaxy

=== Disciplinary record ===
Position	Nation	Number	Name	Total		MLS		Champions League		Open Cup	
Position	Nation	Number	Name	Booked	Sent off (straight red)	Booked	Sent off (straight red)	Booked	Sent off (straight red)	Booked	Sent off (straight red)
GK	(Jamaica)	1	Donovan Ricketts	100	100	1	0	0	0	0	0
DF	(United States)	2	Todd Dunivant	2	0	2	0	0	0	0	0
DF	(United States)	3	Gregg Berhalter	4	0	2	0	1	0	1	0
DF	(United States)	4	Omar Gonzalez	2	0	2	0	0	0	0	0
DF	(United States)	5	Sean Franklin	2	0	2	0	0	0	0	0
DF	(United States)	6	Frankie Hejduk	2	0	2	0	0	0	0	0
MF	(United States)	7	Jovan Kirovski	0	1	0	1	0	0	0	0
MF	(Trinidad and Tobago)	8	Chris Birchall	3	1	3	1	0	0	0	0
FW	(United States)	10	Landon Donovan	4	0	3	0	1	0	0	0
GK	(Puerto Rico)	12	Josh Saunders	1	1	1	1	0	0	0	0
FW	(United States)	17	Adam Cristman	1	0	0	0	0	0	1	0
FW	(United States)	18	Mike Magee	3	0	2	0	1	0	0	0
MF	(Brazil)	19	Juninho	4	2	4	1	0	1	0	0
DF	(United States)	20	A. J. DeLaGarza	2	0	2	0	0	0	0	0
DF	(Brazil)	22	Leonardo	1	0	1	0	0	0	0	0
MF	(England)	23	David Beckham	10	0	9	0	1	0	0	0
MF	(Argentina)	25	Miguel López	2	0	2	0	0	0	0	0
MF	(United States)	26	Michael Stephens	3	0	3	0	0	0	0	0
FW	(United States)	27	Bryan Jordan	1	0	1	0	0	0	0	0
MF	(Uruguay)	30	Paolo Cardozo	1	0	0	0	0	0	1	0
			TOTALS	46	5	39	4	4	1	3	0

Updated to match played August 25, 2011
Source: LA Galaxy

== Club staff ==
Position	Name
General Manager & Head Coach	(United States) Bruce Arena
Assistant head coach	(United States) Dave Sarachan
Assistant coach & Reserve Team Head Coach	(United States) Curt Onalfo
Assistant coach	(United States) Gregg Berhalter
Goalkeeper coach	(United States) Ian Feuer
Director of Soccer Operations	(United States) David Kammarman
Senior Director Galaxy Academy & Special Projects	(United States) Chris Klein
LA Galaxy Academy Coach & Administrator	(England) Craig Harrington
Head Athletic Trainer	(United States) Armando Rivas
Assistant Athletic Trainer	(United States) Cecelia Gutierrez
Equipment Manager	(Mexico) Raul Vargas
Equipment Coordinator	(United States) Rafael Verdin
Team Administrator	(United States) Shant Kasparian
Strength & Conditioning Coach	(United States) Ben Yauss
Active Release Specialist	(United States) Shunta Shimizu

Updated to match played March 27, 2011
Source: LA Galaxy

== Miscellany ==
=== Allocation ranking ===
Los Angeles is in the No. 10 position in the MLS Allocation Ranking. The allocation ranking is the mechanism used to determine which MLS club has first priority to acquire a U.S. National Team player who signs with MLS after playing abroad, or a former MLS player who returns to the league after having gone to a club abroad for a transfer fee. A ranking can be traded, provided that part of the compensation received in return is another club's ranking.

=== International roster spots ===
Los Angeles has 8 international roster spots. Each club in Major League Soccer is allocated 8 international roster spots, which can be traded. Los Angeles dealt one slot to Portland Timbers on November 22, 2010, for use in the 2011 and 2012 seasons then acquired one slot from D.C. United on February 17, 2011, for use in the 2011 and 2012 seasons. There is no limit on the number of international slots on each club's roster. The remaining roster slots must belong to domestic players. For clubs based in the United States, a domestic player is either a U.S. citizen, a permanent resident (green card holder) or the holder of other special status (e.g., refugee or asylum status).

=== Future draft pick trades ===
Future picks acquired: 2012 Supplemental Draft Round 3 pick acquired from Chivas USA.
Future picks traded: 2014 SuperDraft Round 4 pick traded to Houston Dynamo. The Galaxy also traded unspecified future considerations to Toronto FC which may or may not include draft pick(s).

=== MLS rights to other players ===
Los Angeles maintains the MLS rights to Edson Buddle after the player declined a contract offer by the league and signed overseas on a free transfer.
