= 2012 Los Angeles Galaxy season =

American soccer club season

LA Galaxy
2012 season
- Owner: Philip Anschutz (AEG)
- Coach: Bruce Arena
- Major League Soccer: Conference: 4th Overall: 8th
- MLS Cup: Champions
- CONCACAF Champions League (11–12): Quarterfinals
- CONCACAF Champions League (12–13): Quarterfinals
- U.S. Open Cup: Third round
- Top goalscorer: League: Robbie Keane (16); All: Robbie Keane (23)
- Highest home attendance: 27,000 (six matches)
- Lowest home attendance: 16,512 v San Jose Earthquakes (May 23, 2012)
- Average home league attendance: 22,984
Home colors	Away colors	Third colors

The 2012 Los Angeles Galaxy season was the club's 18th year of existence as well as their 17th season in Major League Soccer (MLS) and their 17th consecutive year in the top-flight of American soccer. The Galaxy entered the season as both the defending MLS Cup and Supporters' Shield winners.

The 2012 campaign was highlighted by the Galaxy successfully defending their MLS Cup title, defeating Houston Dynamo, 3–1, in the MLS Cup final to win their fourth ever MLS Cup championship, tying D.C. United for the most league championships in MLS history, and the second most in North American history.

Although Los Angeles defended their MLS Cup trophy, the club failed to defend the Supporters' Shield, losing on point differential to their upstate rivals, the San Jose Earthquakes on point total. Most of this is to blame due to poorer performance early on in the season, before a second-half season resurgence.

Elsewhere, the Galaxy also competed in 2012 Desert Diamond Cup, winning the preseason tournament, the 2011–12 and 2012–13 CONCACAF Champions League, as well as the 2012 U.S. Open Cup. In the 2011–12 edition of the Champions League, the Galaxy reached the quarterfinals before losing 4–3 on aggregate to Canadian side, Toronto FC. In the 2012–13 edition, the Galaxy won their group for the second straight year, and reached the knockout round, which will be played during the 2013 campaign. Finally, the Galaxy were eliminated in the third round proper of the Open Cup losing to second-tier North American Soccer League outfit, Carolina RailHawks.

In noncompetitive tournaments, the Galaxy hosted Spanish club, Real Madrid, in the 2012 World Football Challenge, losing the exhibition match, 1–5.

== Background ==
The Galaxy entered the 2012 season off of one of the franchise's most successful campaigns ever. The club earned the league double, winning both the Supporters' Shield and the MLS Cup. Additionally, the Galaxy reached the quarterfinals of the U.S. Open Cup, and were the only American team to win their group in the CONCACAF Champions League, posting a record of four wins, two losses and no draws.

Following the 2011 MLS Cup Playoffs, the Galaxy embarked on a two-week, postseason tour across Asia, stopping in Australia, the Philippines and Indonesia. During the tour, the Galaxy finished undefeated, winning twice and tying once.

Offseason reports involved David Beckham's contract concluding at the end of 2011, and whether or not he would remain with the Galaxy. On January 18, 2012, Galaxy announced Beckham had signed a new two-year contract to remain in Los Angeles.

== Competitions ==
=== Pre-season ===
February 3, 2012	LA Galaxy	7–2	LA Blues	Carson, California
10:00 PST	Sarvas 12' (pen.); Dunivant 28'; Cristman 36', 45'; Cardozo 42'; McBean 63'; Nakazawa 84'	Report	Russell (yellow card) 17'; Cho 30'; Fondi 84' (pen.)	Stadium: The Home Depot Center

February 7, 2012	LA Galaxy	1–4	Portland Timbers	Carson, California
10:00 PST	Keat 80'	Report	Dike 8'; Perlaza 9'; Marcelin 67'; Danso 85' (pen.)	Stadium: The Home Depot Center

February 10, 2012	LA Galaxy	0–1	Houston Dynamo	Carson, California
10:00 PST	Jimenez (yellow card) 34'	Report	Sturgis 68'; Rolfe (red card) 77'	Stadium: The Home Depot Center; Referee: Alejandro Mariscal

February 14, 2012	LA Galaxy	0–3	Montreal Impact	Carson, California
10:00 PST			Nyassi 37'; Valentin 51'; James 90+'	Stadium: The Home Depot Center

February 16, 2012	LA Galaxy	3–2	Chivas USA	Carson, California
10:00 PST	Noonan 21'; Cristman 31'; Keat 39'; Nakazawa (yellow card) 73'	Report	Lahoud 53'; LaBrocca (yellow card) 61'; Romero 77'	Stadium: The Home Depot Center; Referee: Chris Penso

=== Desert Diamond Cup ===
==== Standings ====
Pos	Team	Pld	W	L	D	GF	GA	GD	Pts
1	New England Revolution	3	3	0	0	7	3	+4	9
2	LA Galaxy	3	1	2	0	5	5	0	3
3	New York Red Bulls	3	1	2	0	2	4	−2	3
4	Real Salt Lake	3	1	2	0	2	4	−2	3

==== Matches ====
February 22, 2012 Group	New England Revolution	3–2	LA Galaxy	Tucson, Arizona
17:00 PST	Feilhaber 2'; Lozano 36'; White 74'		Buddle 31'; Magee 38'	Stadium: Kino Stadium

February 25, 2012 Group	LA Galaxy	2–0	Real Salt Lake	Tucson, Arizona
17:00 PST	Boyens (yellow card) 53'; Cardozo 81'; Magee 87'	Report	Alvarez (yellow card) 50' (yellow-red card) 77'; Grabavoy (red card) 70'	Stadium: Kino Stadium; Referee: Allen Chapman

February 29, 2012 Group	New York Red Bulls	2–1	LA Galaxy	Tucson, Arizona
19:00 PST	Cooper 31'; Henry 62'	Report	Sarvas 78'	Stadium: Kino Stadium; Attendance: 6,212; Referee: Ismail Elfath

March 3, 2012 Championship	New England Revolution	0–0 (2–4 p)	LA Galaxy	Tucson, Arizona
19:00 PST		Report		Stadium: Kino Stadium
	Penalties
	Guy (penalty missed); Reis (penalty scored); Joseph (penalty scored); Feilhaber (penalty missed)		(penalty scored) Cardozo; (penalty missed) Stephens; (penalty scored) Jimenez; (penalty scored) Walker; (penalty scored) Sarvas

=== CONCACAF Champions League (2011–12) ===
March 7, 2012 Quarterfinals	Toronto FC (Canada)	2–2	(United States) LA Galaxy	Toronto, Ontario, Canada
17:00 PST	Johnson 12'; Silva 17'; Frei (yellow card) 81'		Magee 29'; Donovan 88'	Stadium: Rogers Centre; Attendance: 47,658; Referee: Courtney Campbell

March 14, 2012 Quarterfinals	LA Galaxy (United States)	1–2 (3–4 agg.)	(Canada) Toronto FC	Carson
19:00 PST	Franklin (yellow card) 43'; Harden 55' (o.g.)	Report	Eckersley (yellow card) 19'; Johnson 34'; Aceval (yellow card) 63'; Soolsma 67'; Frings (yellow card) 92+'	Stadium: The Home Depot Center; Attendance: 7,500; Referee: Roberto Moreno

=== Major League Soccer ===
==== Standings ====
Western Conference Table

Pos	Team	Pld	W	L	T	GF	GA	GD	Pts	Qualification
1	San Jose Earthquakes	34	19	6	9	72	43	+29	66	MLS Cup Conference Semifinals
2	Real Salt Lake	34	17	11	6	46	35	+11	57	MLS Cup Conference Semifinals
3	Seattle Sounders FC	34	15	8	11	51	33	+18	56	MLS Cup Conference Semifinals
4	LA Galaxy	34	16	12	6	59	47	+12	54	MLS Cup Knockout Round
5	Vancouver Whitecaps FC	34	11	13	10	35	41	−6	43	MLS Cup Knockout Round
6	FC Dallas	34	9	13	12	42	47	−5	39	
7	Colorado Rapids	34	11	19	4	44	50	−6	37	
8	Portland Timbers	34	8	16	10	34	56	−22	34	
9	Chivas USA	34	7	18	9	24	58	−34	30	

Source: MLS

Overall table

Pos	Team	Pld	W	L	T	GF	GA	GD	Pts	Qualification
1	San Jose Earthquakes (S)	34	19	6	9	72	43	+29	66	CONCACAF Champions League
2	Sporting Kansas City	34	18	7	9	42	27	+15	63	CONCACAF Champions League
3	D.C. United	34	17	10	7	53	43	+10	58	
4	New York Red Bulls	34	16	9	9	57	46	+11	57	
5	Real Salt Lake	34	17	11	6	46	35	+11	57	
6	Chicago Fire	34	17	11	6	46	41	+5	57	
7	Seattle Sounders FC	34	15	8	11	51	33	+18	56	
8	LA Galaxy (C)	34	16	12	6	59	47	+12	54	CONCACAF Champions League
9	Houston Dynamo	34	14	9	11	48	41	+7	53	CONCACAF Champions League
10	Columbus Crew	34	15	12	7	44	44	0	52	
11	Vancouver Whitecaps FC	34	11	13	10	35	41	−6	43	
12	Montreal Impact	34	12	16	6	45	51	−6	42	CONCACAF Champions League
13	FC Dallas	34	9	13	12	42	47	−5	39	
14	Colorado Rapids	34	11	19	4	44	50	−6	37	
15	Philadelphia Union	34	10	18	6	37	45	−8	36	
16	New England Revolution	34	9	17	8	39	44	−5	35	
17	Portland Timbers	34	8	16	10	34	56	−22	34	
18	Chivas USA	34	7	18	9	24	58	−34	30	
19	Toronto FC	34	5	21	8	36	62	−26	23	

Source: MLS
Rules for classification: 1) points; 2) head-to-head record; 3) goal difference; 4) number of goals scored
(C) MLS Cup Champion; (S) Supporters' Shield

==== Matches ====
Win Tie Loss

March 10, 2012 1	LA Galaxy	1–3	Real Salt Lake	Carson, CA
19:30 PDT	Buddle 71'	Report	Beckerman (yellow card) 36'; Franklin 73' (o.g.); Morales 80', (yellow card) 80'; Espíndola 85'	Stadium: The Home Depot Center; Attendance: 27,000; Referee: Kevin Stott

March 18, 2012 2	LA Galaxy	3–1	D.C. United	Carson, CA
16:00 PDT	Keane 45', 69'; Sarvas 86'	Report	DeLeon 87'	Stadium: The Home Depot Center; Attendance: 18,466; Referee: Baldomero Toledo

March 31, 2012 3	LA Galaxy	1–3	New England Revolution	Carson, CA
20:00 PDT	Keane 78'	Report; Live TV: NBC Sports	Rowe 10'; Tierney 13'; Sène 65'	Stadium: The Home Depot Center; Attendance: 21,324; Referee: Ricardo Salazar

April 7, 2012 4	Sporting Kansas City	1–0	LA Galaxy	Kansas City, KS
2:00 PDT	Kamara 40'	Report	Donovan (yellow card) 89'	Stadium: LIVESTRONG Sporting Park; Attendance: 20,323; Referee: Jorge Gonzalez

April 14, 2012 5	LA Galaxy	3–1	Portland Timbers	Carson, CA
19:30 PDT	Donovan 44'; Juninho 83'; Beckham 91'	Report	Boyd (yellow card) 14'; Boyd 23'; Mosquera (yellow card) 26'	Stadium: The Home Depot Center; Attendance: 22,153; Referee: Jair Marrufo

April 21, 2012 6	Colorado Rapids	1–2	LA Galaxy	Commerce City, CO
18:00 PDT	Larentowicz (yellow card) 23'; Kimura (yellow card) 43'; Cummings 63', (yellow card) 83'	Report	Wynne 21' (o.g.); Donovan 39'; Juninho (yellow card) 66'; Lopes (yellow card) 90+1'	Stadium: Dick's Sporting Goods Park; Attendance: 19,152; Referee: Ramon Hernandez

April 28, 2012 7	LA Galaxy	1–1	FC Dallas	Carson, CA
19:30 PDT	Gaudette (yellow card) 60'; Cristman (yellow card) 83'; Noonan 90+2'; Beckham (yellow card) 90+5'	Report	Shea (yellow card) 4', (goal) 61' (pen.); Castillo (yellow card) 19'; Benítez (yellow card) 48'	Stadium: The Home Depot Center; Attendance: 23,249; Referee: Ricardo Salazar

May 2, 2012 8	Seattle Sounders FC	2–0	LA Galaxy	Seattle, WA
19:00 PDT	Johnson 40'; Montero 48'	Report	Sarvas (yellow card) 34'	Stadium: CenturyLink Field; Attendance: 39,002; Referee: Hilario Grajeda

May 5, 2012 9	LA Galaxy	0–1	New York Red Bulls	Carson, CA
17:00 PDT	Beckham (yellow card) 32'; Barrett (yellow card) 88'	Report	Lindpere 19'; Richards (yellow card) 31'; McCarty (yellow card) 80'	Stadium: The Home Depot Center; Attendance: 27,000; Referee: Kevin Stott

May 12, 2012 10	Montreal Impact	1–1	LA Galaxy	Montreal, QC
13:00 PDT	Arnaud 8'; Ferrari (yellow card) 46'	Report	Keat (yellow card) 44'; Beckham (yellow card) 54', (goal) 62'; Juninho (yellow card) 57'	Stadium: Olympic Stadium; Attendance: 60,860; Referee: Jason Anno

May 19, 2012 11	Chivas USA	1–0	LA Galaxy	Carson, CA
19:30 PDT	Minda (yellow card) 36'; Correa 70' (pen.)	Report	Lopes (red card) 70'; Donovan (yellow card) 85'	Stadium: The Home Depot Center; Attendance: 18,800; Referee: Mark Geiger

May 23, 2012 12	LA Galaxy	2–3	San Jose Earthquakes	Carson, CA
19:30 PDT	Jimenez 3', (red card) 59'; Gaul (yellow card) 55'; Magee 73'; Beckham (yellow card) 81'	Report	Lenhart (yellow card) 47', (goal) 76'; Stephenson 82'; Gordon 90+4', (yellow card) 90+5'	Stadium: The Home Depot Center; Attendance: 16,512; Referee: Jair Marrufo

May 26, 2012 13	Houston Dynamo	2–1	LA Galaxy	Houston, TX
11:30 PDT	Magee 38' (o.g.); Hainault 57'; Watson (yellow card) 86'	Report	Buddle 10'; Stephens (yellow card) 46'; Gaul (yellow card) 59'; Magee (yellow card) 90+2'	Stadium: BBVA Compass Stadium; Attendance: 22,039; Referee: Silviu Petrescu

June 17, 2012 14	LA Galaxy	1–0	Portland Timbers	Carson, CA
16:00 PDT	Dunivant (yellow card) 33', (goal) 61'	Report	Chabala (yellow card) 40'; Perkins (yellow card) 61'; Chará (yellow card) 71'	Stadium: The Home Depot Center; Attendance: 20,611; Referee: Geoff Gamble

June 20, 2012 15	Real Salt Lake	2–3	LA Galaxy	Sandy, UT
18:00 PDT	Beckerman 9'; Saborío 24'; Steele (yellow card) 53'; Morales (yellow card) 66'; Espíndola (yellow card) 80'	Report	Donovan 29', 68'; Magee 50'; DeLaGarza (yellow card) 53'	Stadium: Rio Tinto Stadium; Attendance: 20,382; Referee: Kevin Stott

June 23, 2012 16	LA Galaxy	3–0	Vancouver Whitecaps FC	Carson, CA
19:30 PDT	Beckham (yellow card) 10'; Magee 16'; Keane 30'; Donovan 41' (pen.); Franklin (yellow card) 68'	Report	Mattocks (yellow card) 25'; Davidson (yellow card) 61'	Stadium: The Home Depot Center; Attendance: 21,529; Referee: Allen Chapman

June 30, 2012 17	San Jose Earthquakes	4–3	LA Galaxy	Stanford, CA
19:00 PDT	Lenhart 7', (yellow card) 47'; Bernárdez 44', (yellow card) 51'; Cronin 47'; Wondolowski 61'	Report	Juninho (yellow card) 24'; Beckham 31', (yellow card) 90+3'; Hernandez 36' (o.g.); Donovan 41'; David Lopes (yellow card) 86'	Stadium: Stanford Stadium; Attendance: 50,391; Referee: Hilario Grajeda

July 4, 2012 18	LA Galaxy	1–2	Philadelphia Union	Carson, CA
19:30 PDT	Barrett 73'; DeLaGarza (yellow card) 90+7'	Report	Valdés (yellow card) 14'; McInerney 45+1'; Okugo (yellow card) 70'; MacMath (yellow card) 78'; Farfan 90+5'	Stadium: The Home Depot Center; Attendance: 27,000; Referee: Armando Villarreal

July 8, 2012 19	Chicago Fire	0–2	LA Galaxy	Bridgeview, IL
12:00 PDT	Pappa (yellow card) 69'	Report	Juninho (yellow card) 14'; David Lopes (yellow card) 16'; Keane 24' (pen.), 78'	Stadium: Toyota Park; Attendance: 20,563; Referee: Jair Marrufo

July 14, 2012 20	Portland Timbers	3–5	LA Galaxy	Portland, OR
20:00 PDT	Boyd 3', 70'; Kimura 35'; Alexander (yellow card) 72'	Report	Beckham 20', 25'; Donovan 26' (pen.); Keane 29', 64'	Stadium: JELD-WEN Field; Attendance: 20,438; Referee: Baldomero Toledo

July 18, 2012 21	Vancouver Whitecaps FC	2–2	LA Galaxy	Vancouver, BC
19:00 PDT	Koffie 18'; Robson 27'; DeMerit (yellow card) 59'	Report	Donovan (yellow card) 45+1'; Beckham 81'; David Lopes (yellow card) 83'; Villarreal (yellow card) 86', (goal) 87'	Stadium: BC Place; Attendance: 21,000; Referee: Silviu Petrescu

July 21, 2012 22	LA Galaxy	3–1	Chivas USA	Carson, CA
19:00 PDT	Keane 14'; Beckham (yellow card) 32'; Donovan 48', 78', (yellow card) 53'	Report	Smith (yellow card) 18'; Zemanski (yellow card) 36'; McKenzie (yellow card) 47'; Cardozo 52'	Stadium: The Home Depot Center; Attendance: 25,180; Referee: Jorge Gonzalez

July 27, 2012 23	FC Dallas	0–1	LA Galaxy	Frisco, TX
17:00 PDT	John (yellow card) 89'	Report	Magee 62'; DeLaGarza (yellow card) 65'; Sarvas (yellow card) 69'	Stadium: FC Dallas Stadium; Attendance: 22,565; Referee: Hilario Grajeda

August 5, 2012 24	Seattle Sounders FC	4–0	LA Galaxy	Seattle, WA
19:00 PDT	Johnson 6'; Montero 52'; Evans (yellow card) 60'; Caskey 61'; Rose 88'	Report	DeLaGarza (yellow card) 24'	Stadium: CenturyLink Field; Attendance: 60,908; Referee: Chris Penso

August 12, 2012 25	Chivas USA	0–4	LA Galaxy	Carson, CA
20:00 PDT	Valencia (yellow card) 33'	Report	Keane 27'; Juninho 64', 74'; Gonzalez 83'	Stadium: The Home Depot Center; Attendance: 17,601; Referee: Jair Marrufo

August 15, 2012 26	Columbus Crew	1–1	LA Galaxy	Columbus, OH
17:00 PDT	Arrieta 47'	Report	Keane 64'; Sarvas (yellow card) 87'	Stadium: Crew Stadium; Attendance: 17,019; Referee: Edvin Jurisevic

August 26, 2012 27	LA Galaxy	2–0	FC Dallas	Carson, CA
16:00 PDT	Dunivant (yellow card) 11', (goal) 84'; Franklin (yellow card) 27'; Juninho 66'; Sarvas (yellow card) 72'; Gonzalez (yellow card) 90+2'	Report	Perez (yellow card) 90+1'	Stadium: The Home Depot Center; Attendance: 21,933; Referee: Kevin Stott

September 1, 2012 28	LA Galaxy	2–0	Vancouver Whitecaps FC	Carson, CA
19:00 PDT	Gonzalez (yellow card) 21'; Juninho 41'; Beckham 79'	Report	Richards (yellow card) 61'; Barbara (yellow card) 90+1'	Stadium: The Home Depot Center; Attendance: 20,168; Referee: Baldomero Toledo

September 16, 2012 29	LA Galaxy	2–0	Colorado Rapids	Carson, CA
16:00 PDT	Keane 15'; Wilhelmsson 58'; DeLaGarza (yellow card) 77'	Report		Stadium: The Home Depot Center; Attendance: 20,204; Referee: Ismail Elfath

September 22, 2012 30	LA Galaxy	4–2	Toronto FC	Carson, CA
19:30 PDT	Juninho 11', 33'; Keane 36', 90+2'	Report	Johnson (yellow card) 30'; Dunfield 38'; O'Dea (yellow card) 79'; Morgan (yellow card) 84'; Silva 86'	Stadium: The Home Depot Center; Attendance: 27,000; Referee: Silvia Reyes

September 30, 2012 31	Colorado Rapids	1–1	LA Galaxy	Commerce City, CO
16:00 PDT	Larentowicz (yellow card) 2'; Castrillón 16'	Report	Sarvas 10'; Magee (yellow card) 17'; Donovan (yellow card) 29'	Stadium: Dick's Sporting Goods Park; Attendance: 17,649; Referee: Allen Chapman

October 6, 2012 32	LA Galaxy	1–2	Real Salt Lake	Carson, CA
18:00 PDT	Keane 17'; Gaul (yellow card) 64'	Report	Espindola 25', 28'; Beltran (yellow card) 71'	Stadium: The Home Depot Center; Attendance: 27,000; Referee: Baldomero Toledo

October 21, 2012 33	San Jose Earthquakes	2–2	LA Galaxy	Santa Clara, CA
16:00 PDT	Chavez 61'; Wondolowski 73'	Report	Keane 59'; Buddle 69'	Stadium: Buck Shaw Stadium; Attendance: 10,744; Referee: Jair Marrufo

October 28, 2012 34	LA Galaxy	1–0	Seattle Sounders FC	Carson, CA
18:00 PDT	Magee 83'	Report		Stadium: The Home Depot Center; Attendance: 27,000; Referee: Kevin Stott

=== MLS Cup playoffs ===
==== Knockout round ====
November 1, 2012	LA Galaxy	2–1	Vancouver Whitecaps FC	Carson, California
19:30 PDT	Juninho (yellow card) 43'; Magee 69'; Donovan 73'	Report	Mattocks 3'	Stadium: The Home Depot Center; Attendance: 14,703; Referee: Silviu Petrescu

==== Conference semifinals ====
November 4, 2012 First Leg	LA Galaxy	0–1	San Jose Earthquakes	The Home Depot Center, Carson, California
6:00 PM PST		Report	Chávez (yellow card) 17'; Bernárdez 90+4'	Attendance: 27,000; Referee: Ricardo Salazar

November 7, 2012 Second Leg	San Jose Earthquakes	1–3 (2–3 agg.)	LA Galaxy	Buck Shaw Stadium, Santa Clara, California
7:00 PM PST	Bernárdez (yellow card) 4'; Lenhart (yellow card) 42'; Gordon 82'	Report	Beckham (yellow card) 17'; Keane 21', 34'; Magee 39'; Gonzalez (yellow card) 41'	Attendance: 10,744; Referee: Kevin Stott

==== Conference finals ====
November 11, 2012 First Leg	LA Galaxy	3–0	Seattle Sounders FC	The Home Depot Center, Carson, California
6:00 PM PST	Keane 45+1', 67'; Magee 64'	Report	Hurtado (yellow card) 14'	Attendance: 27,000; Referee: Jair Marrufo

November 18, 2012 Second Leg	Seattle Sounders FC	2–1 (2–4 agg.)	LA Galaxy	CenturyLink Field, Seattle, Washington
7:00 PM PST	Johnson 12', (yellow card) 68'; Scott 57'; Alonso (yellow card) 74' (yellow-red card) 90+5'	Report	Keane 68' (pen.)	Attendance: 44,575; Referee: Mark Geiger

==== Championship ====
December 1, 2012	LA Galaxy	3–1	Houston Dynamo	The Home Depot Center, Carson, California
1:30 PM PST	Gonzalez 60'; Donovan 65' (pen.); Keane 90+4' (pen.)	Report	Carr 44'	Attendance: 30,510; Referee: Silviu Petrescu

=== U.S. Open Cup ===
May 29, 2012 Third round	Carolina RailHawks	2–1	LA Galaxy	Cary, NC
	Shipalane 75'; Shriver 88'	Report	Noonan 38'	Stadium: WakeMed Soccer Park; Attendance: 7,939; Referee: Kevin Terry

=== International Friendlies ===
July 24, 2012	LA Galaxy	1–1	Tottenham Hotspur	Carson, CA
19:30 PDT	Lopes 29'	Report	Bale 17'	Stadium: The Home Depot Center

=== World Football Challenge ===
August 2, 2012	LA Galaxy	1–5	Real Madrid	Carson, CA
19:30 PDT	David Lopes 23'	Report	Higuaín 2'; Di María 11'; Callejón 36'; Morata 49'; Jesé 84'	Stadium: The Home Depot Center; Attendance: 30,317; Referee: Ricardo Salazar

=== CONCACAF Champions League (2012–13) ===
The Galaxy earned a berth into the group stage of the CONCACAF Champions League by winning the Supporters Shield on October 8, 2011. Since the Galaxy also won the MLS Cup, which also merits a direct bye into group play, the Galaxy forfeited their Shield berth to the Sounders and took the MLS Cup berth.

==== Group 5 Table ====
Team	Pld	W	D	L	GF	GA	GD	Pts	Qualification	LA	PRI	MET
(United States) Los Angeles Galaxy	4	3	1	0	12	4	+8	10	Advance to championship round		4–0	5–2
Puerto Rico Islanders	4	1	1	2	4	7	−3	4		0–0		3–0
(El Salvador) Isidro Metapán	4	1	0	3	7	12	−5	3		2–3	3–1	

==== Group Stage Matches ====
August 23, 2012 Group stage	LA Galaxy (United States)	5–2	(El Salvador) Isidro Metapán	Carson, CA
19:00 PDT	DeLaGarza (yellow card) 6'; Alvarado 20' (o.g.); Keane 22', (yellow card) 70' (red card) 70'; Beckham 45+1'; Stephens (yellow card) 80'; Juninho 82', 90'	Report	Muñoz 17', 87' (pen.)	Stadium: The Home Depot Center; Attendance: 10,574; Referee: Jose Alfredo Penaloza (MEX)

August 29, 2012 Group stage	LA Galaxy (United States)	4–0	Puerto Rico Islanders	Carson, CA
19:00 PDT	Meyer 7'; Villarreal 46'; McBean 80'; Stephens 82'	Report		Stadium: The Home Depot Center; Attendance: 7,500; Referee: Jafeth Perea (PAN)

September 19, 2012 Group stage	Puerto Rico Islanders	0–0	(United States) LA Galaxy	Bayamón, Puerto Rico
17:00 PDT		Report		Stadium: Juan Ramón Loubriel; Attendance: 2,905; Referee: Raymond Bogle (JAM)

October 25, 2012 Group stage	Isidro Metapán (El Salvador)	2–3	(United States) LA Galaxy	Metapán, El Salvador
19:00 PDT	Muñoz 55'; Suárez 67'	Report	McBean 38', 62'; Stephens 79'	Stadium: Estadio Jorge Calero Suárez; Attendance: 1,318; Referee: H. Cruz (CRC)

== Player movement and trades ==
=== Transfers ===
==== In ====
No.	Pos.	Player	Transferred from	Fee/notes	Date	Ref.
8	MF	(Brazil) Marcelo Sarvas	(Costa Rica) LD Alajuelense	Free	December 13, 2011	
33	MF	(United States) Jose Villarreal	(United States) LA Galaxy Youth Academy	Free	December 22, 2011	
34	MF	(United States) Kyle Nakazawa	(United States) Philadelphia Union	Traded for	February 1, 2012	
14	FW	(United States) Edson Buddle	(Germany) Ingolstadt 04	Free	February 1, 2012	
22	DF	(Brazil) Leonardo	(Brazil) São Paulo	Free	February 7, 2012	
1	GK	(Puerto Rico) Bill Gaudette	(Canada) Montreal Impact	Free	February 29, 2012	
3	DF	(Brazil) David Junior Lopes	(United States) Chivas USA	Traded for	April 10, 2012	
1	GK	(United States) Brian Rowe	Unattached	Free	July 13, 2012	
9	MF	(Sweden) Christian Wilhelmsson	(Saudi Arabia) Al-Hilal FC	Free	September 5, 2012	

==== MLS Drafts ====
Pos.	Player	Transferred from	Fee/notes	Date	Ref.
DF	(New Zealand) Andrew Boyens	(United States) Chivas USA	Stage Two MLS Re-Entry Draft, Round 1	December 12, 2011	
DF	(United States) Chris Leitch	(United States) San Jose Earthquakes	Stage Two MLS Re-Entry Draft, Round 2	December 12, 2011	
FW	(United States) Pat Noonan	(United States) Seattle Sounders FC	Stage Two MLS Re-Entry Draft, Round 3	December 12, 2011	
GK	(United States) Jon Conway	(United States) Chicago Fire	Stage Two MLS Re-Entry Draft, Round 4	December 12, 2011	
DF	(United States) Tommy Meyer	(United States) Indiana University	SuperDraft, 1st round	January 12, 2012	
MF	(United States) Kenney Walker	(United States) University of Louisville	SuperDraft, 2nd round	January 12, 2012	
DF	(United States) Bryan Gaul	(United States) Bradley University	Supplemental Draft, 1st round	January 17, 2012	
MF	(United States) Rafael Garcia	(United States) Cal State Northridge	Supplemental Draft, 2nd round	January 17, 2012	
FW	(Brazil) Yuri Gorentzvaig	(Brazil) Flamengo	Supplemental Draft, 3rd round	January 17, 2012	
FW	(United States) Steven Posa	(United States) University of San Diego	Supplemental Draft, 4th round	January 17, 2012	
DF	(United States) Justin Davies	(United States) San Diego State University	Supplemental Draft, 4th round	January 17, 2012	

==== Out ====
No.	Pos.	Player	Transferred to	Fee/notes	Date	Ref.
3	DF	(United States) Gregg Berhalter	None	Retired	October 12, 2011	
1	GK	(Jamaica) Donovan Ricketts	(Canada) Montreal Impact	Traded	November 28, 2011	
25	MF	(Argentina) Miguel López	(Argentina) Quilmes	Loan expired	December 31, 2011	
6	DF	(United States) Frankie Hejduk	None	Out of contract	January 19, 2012	
7	FW	(United States) Jovan Kirovski	None	Retired	January 19, 2012	
29	DF	(United States) Dasan Robinson	None	Retired	January 23, 2012	
33	DF	(United States) Sean Alvarado	None	Released	January 23, 2012	
8	MF	(Trinidad and Tobago) Chris Birchall	(United States) Columbus Crew	Out of contract	February 6, 2012	
21	MF	(United States) Dustin McCarty	None	Released	February 13, 2012	
28	DF	(United States) Ryan Thomas	None	Released	February 13, 2012	
55	DF	(United States) Joshua Kelly	None	Out of contract	February 13, 2012	
30	MF	(Uruguay) Paolo Cardozo	(United States) Chivas USA	Traded	April 10, 2012	
17	FW	(United States) Adam Cristman	None	Retired	July 3, 2012	
1	GK	(Puerto Rico) Bill Gaudette	(United States) New York Red Bulls	Traded	July 13, 2012	

=== Loan in ===
No.	Pos.	Player	Previous club	Start	End	Ref.
19	MF	(Brazil) Juninho	(Brazil) São Paulo	December 23, 2009	December 31, 2012	

=== Loan out ===
No.	Pos.	Player	Loaned to	Start	End	Ref.
10	MF	(United States) Landon Donovan	(England) Everton	January 1, 2012	February 19, 2012	
4	DF	(United States) Omar Gonzalez	(Germany) Nuremberg	January 5, 2012	February 15, 2012	
14	FW	(Republic of Ireland) Robbie Keane	(England) Aston Villa	January 9, 2012	February 26, 2012	
9	FW	(United States) Chad Barrett	(Norway) Vålerenga	July 31, 2012	December 31, 2012	

== Kits ==
Home	Away	Third	Special

Type	Shirt	Shorts	Socks	First appearance / Info
Home	White	White	White	
Away	Blue-grey	Blue-grey	Blue-grey	
Third	Black	Black	Black	
Special	White	Blue-grey	White	2011–12 CCL, ¼-Finals, March 7 against Toronto → Training Shirt

== Miscellany ==
=== Allocation ranking ===
Los Angeles is in the #19 position in the MLS Allocation Ranking. The allocation ranking is the mechanism used to determine which MLS club has first priority to acquire a U.S. National Team player who signs with MLS after playing abroad, or a former MLS player who returns to the league after having gone to a club abroad for a transfer fee. A ranking can be traded, provided that part of the compensation received in return is another club's ranking.

=== International roster slots ===
Los Angeles has 7 MLS International Roster Slots for use in the 2012 season. Each club in Major League Soccer is allocated 8 international roster spots. Los Angeles traded one slot to Portland Timbers, traded another to Philadelphia Union, and acquired one from D.C. United. Each of these trades expire on January 1, 2013.

=== Future draft pick trades ===
Future picks acquired:

- 2013 MLS SuperDraft Round 2 pick from Philadelphia Union
- 2014 MLS Supplemental Draft Round 2 pick from New York Red Bulls

Future picks traded:

- 2014 MLS SuperDraft Round 4 pick to Houston Dynamo
