= Miguel López (footballer, born 1988) =

Argentine footballer

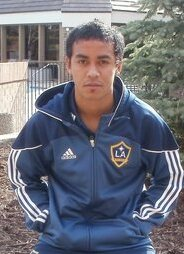

Personal information
- Full name: Miguel Pedro López
- Date of birth: June 9, 1988 (age 38)
- Place of birth: Ensenada, Argentina
- Height: 5 ft 9 in (1.75 m)
- Position: Midfielder

Team information
- Current team: Real Pilar

Youth career
- 1999–2005: Gimnasia LP

Senior career*
Years	Team	Apps	(Gls)
2005–2008	Deportivo Coreano	20	(2)
2008–2009	Cambaceres	28	(4)
2009–2013	Quilmes	23	(0)
2011	→ LA Galaxy (loan)	21	(1)
2013–2014	Gandzasar Kapan	14	(1)
2014–2015	Tristán Suárez	10	(1)
2015–2016	Banants	35	(8)
2017	Racing de Olavarría	14	(1)
2018–2021	Excursionistas	112	(17)
2022–	Real Pilar	11	(1)
- * Club domestic league appearances and goals as of 17:34, 4 August 2022 (UTC)

Miguel Pedro López (born June 9, 1988, in Ensenada) is an Argentine footballer who plays for Real Pilar.

== Club career ==
=== South America ===
López began his career in the youth ranks of Gimnasia La Plata. In 2005, he moved to Deportivo Coreano. After three years with Coreano, López joined Defensores de Cambaceres. After a fine season with Defensores de Cambaceres he was signed by Quilmes. While with Quilmes López appeared in 21 league matches and helped his side earn promotion to the Primera Division in August 2010. While in Argentina López appeared in 69 league matches and scored 6 goals.

=== United States ===
On January 28, 2011, LA Galaxy signed López on a loan deal from Quilmes. He made his MLS debut on March 26, 2011, as a second-half substitute in a 4–1 loss to Real Salt Lake He scored his first goal for Galaxy on May 28, in a 1–0 win over New England Revolution on an assist from David Beckham.

The loan deal with Galaxy expired on December 31, 2011, and López returned to Quilmes.

=== Banants ===
López left Banants at the end of the 2015–16 season.

== Career statistics ==
=== Club ===
As of match played 14 May 2016

Appearances and goals by club, season and competition
Club	Season	League			National Cup		Continental		Total	
Club	Season	Division	Apps	Goals	Apps	Goals	Apps	Goals	Apps	Goals
Quilmes	2009–10	Primera B Nacional	21	0	-		-		21	0
Quilmes	2010–11	Argentine Primera División	0	0	-		-		0	0
Quilmes	2011–12	Primera B Nacional	1	0	1	0	-		2	0
Quilmes	2012–13	Argentine Primera División	1	0	0	0	-		1	0
Quilmes	Total		23	0	1	0	-	-	24	0
LA Galaxy (loan)	2011	Major League Soccer	21	1	1	0	2	0	24	1
Gandzasar Kapan	2013–14	Armenian Premier League	14	1	3	0	-		17	1
Tristán Suárez	2014	Primera B Metropolitana	10	1	0	0	-		10	1
Banants	2014–15	Armenian Premier League	12	6	2	0	-		14	6
Banants	2015–16	Armenian Premier League	23	2	5	0	-		28	2
Banants	Total		35	8	7	0	-	-	42	8
Career total			103	11	12	0	2	0	117	11

== Honors ==
LA Galaxy

- MLS Cup (1): 2011
- Major League Soccer Supporters' Shield (1): 2011
- Major League Soccer Western Conference Championship (1): 2011

Banants

- Armenian Cup (1): 2015–16
