= Brian Perk =

American soccer player (born 1989)

Personal information
- Full name: Brian Gregory Perk
- Date of birth: July 21, 1989 (age 37)
- Place of birth: Rancho Santa Margarita, California, United States
- Height: 5 ft 11 in (1.80 m)
- Position: Goalkeeper

Youth career
- 1998–2004: Pateadores
- 2004–2006: IMG Soccer Academy
- 2006–2009: UCLA Bruins

Senior career*
| Years | Team | Apps | (Gls) |
| 2009 | Seattle Wolves | 1 | (0) |
| 2010 | Philadelphia Union | 1 | (0) |
| 2010–2015 | LA Galaxy | 7 | (0) |
| 2014 | → LA Galaxy II (loan) | 5 | (0) |

International career^{‡}
| 2004–2006 | United States U17 | 9 | (0) |
| 2006–2007 | United States U18 | 8 | (0) |
| 2007–2009 | United States U20 | 18 | (0) |
Medal record
Representing United States
| Runner-up | CONCACAF U-20 Championship | 2009 |
- * Club domestic league appearances and goals as of April 24, 2015 ‡ National team caps and goals as of December 30, 2014

Brian Gregory Perk (born July 21, 1989) is an American former soccer player.

== Career ==
=== College and amateur ===
Perk appeared in goal for the UCLA Bruins between 2006 and 2009, where he won numerous individual honors, including – 2006 Top Drawer Soccer All-Freshman second team 2007 Pre-season All-American selection by Soccer America and Pac-10 Player of the Week for Sept. 4–10 and Top Drawer Soccer Team of the Week on October 15, 2008, Pac-10 Player of the Week for Oct 21 (2009)Named Pac-10 Player of the Week twice (week of Oct 18, Sept. 6) and Second-team NSCAA All-American and first-team All-Pac-10 honoree and Top Drawer Soccer Team of the Season .

During his college years Perk also played in the USL Premier Development League for Seattle Wolves.

=== Professional ===
Perk was drafted in the fourth round (49th overall) of the 2010 MLS SuperDraft by Philadelphia Union. He debuted on July 14, 2010, coming in as a second-half substitute in a friendly against Celtic F.C. He would also play in the second half of another friendly against Manchester United on July 21, 2010, at Lincoln Financial Field.

Perk was waived by Philadelphia on July 30, 2010, without ever making a first team appearance for the club. Shortly after his release, he was claimed off waivers by the Los Angeles Galaxy on August 4, 2010.

In his first career MLS appearance on July 4, 2011, for Los Angeles Galaxy vs. Seattle Sounders FC, he saved a penalty kick taken by Fredy Montero in the first half and secured a clean sheet after the final whistle.

=== International ===
Perk was the starting goalkeeper for the US at the 2009 FIFA U-20 World Cup and the 2009 CONCACAF U-20 Championship.

== Honors ==
=== LA Galaxy ===
- MLS Cup (3): 2011, 2012, 2014
- Major League Soccer Supporters' Shield (2): 2010, 2011
- Major League Soccer Western Conference Championship (1): 2011, 2012
