= Dan Keat =

New Zealand footballer (born 1987)

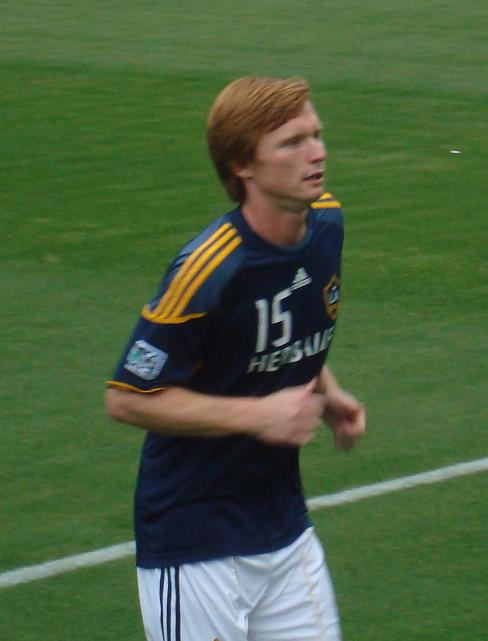
- Keat with LA Galaxy in 2011

Personal information
- Full name: Daniel Phillip Keat
- Date of birth: 28 September 1987 (age 39)
- Place of birth: Barnstaple, England
- Height: 1.80 m (5 ft 11 in)
- Position: Midfielder

Youth career
- 1994–2002: Stokes Valley

College career
Years	Team	Apps	(Gls)
2006–2010	Dartmouth Big Green	82	(26)

Senior career*
Years	Team	Apps	(Gls)
2002–2004	Western Suburbs FC	0	(0)
2004–2006	Team Wellington	28	(5)
2009–2010	Team Wellington	7	(0)
2011–2012	Los Angeles Galaxy	6	(0)
2013–2015	Falkenberg	70	(9)
2016–2017	GAIS	16	(1)

International career^{‡}
2007	New Zealand U20	6	(4)
2008	New Zealand U23	3	(0)
2012–2014	New Zealand	7	(0)
- * Club domestic league appearances and goals as of 18 June 2017 ‡ National team caps and goals as of 18 November 2014

Daniel Phillip Keat (born 28 September 1987) is a former New Zealand footballer who played as a midfielder.

== Amateur career ==
His hometown is Lower Hutt, where he attended Hutt International Boys' School in Upper Hutt and was named Sportsman of the Year in 2004 and 2005. He was also named the College Sport Wellington 2005 Sportsperson of the Year for his achievements in football. Keat made 28 appearances for Team Wellington in the New Zealand Football Championship before making his way to the United States to take up a scholarship with Dartmouth College.

=== Dartmouth College ===
At the end of high school in 2006, Keat began his undergraduate education with fellow New Zealand U-20 soon-to-be teammate Craig Henderson at Dartmouth College and has since graduated with a government major.

Keat has earned All-American status and on the back of a stellar 2009 season, was named in the All-Ivy first team and the NSCAA All-Northeast squads. This led to trials with Scottish Premier league giants Rangers F.C. and also another trial at England's Blackburn Rovers.

== Professional career ==
In 2004, Keat was offered a month-long trial with Premier League club Blackburn Rovers, however a fractured ankle suffered playing school football two weeks before he was set to leave looked to have scuttled his chance. Blackburn opted to wait for Keat to recover and offered him a new trial opportunity in January 2005. Unfortunately, Keat's trial was unsuccessful and he returned to the NZFC for round 12 of the 2005–06 season.

=== Los Angeles ===
Keat was selected third overall in the 2011 MLS Supplemental Draft by the Los Angeles Galaxy. He has already signed a contract with Major League Soccer. After recovering for two months from the heel fracture he suffered during pre-season training Keat made his senior debut in a friendly versus Real Madrid.

Keat's 2013 option was not taken by Los Angeles at the end of the 2012 MLS season.

=== Falkenbergs FF ===
After leaving Los Angeles, Keat signed with Falkenbergs FF in the Swedish Superettan. Keat was part of the Falkenbergs FF side that won the 2013 Superettan. Keat made 20 appearances and scored 4 goals.

=== GAIS ===
Early 2016, Dan signed with GAIS.

== International career ==
Keat captained the under 20's while scoring 4 times in 6 games in qualifying for their first appearance at the FIFA U-20 World Cup, in Canada 2007.

In their World Cup build up, Keat scored a goal in a friendly match against Wellington A-League franchise Wellington Phoenix in a 2–1 upset win.

He was also a part of the Under 23's in their qualifying campaign to the 2008 Beijing Olympic Games, however after playing all 5 qualifying games he suffered a devastating knee injury while playing for his University side Dartmouth College in the US and was missed the entire tournament.

Keat made his debut with the full national team on 29 February 2012 against Jamaica. He came on in the 64th minute for Michael McGlinchey.

=== International goals and caps ===
New Zealand's goal tally first.

International appearances and goals
#	Date	Venue	Opponent	Result	Competition	Goal	Match Report
2012
1	29 February	Mount Smart Stadium, Auckland	Jamaica	2–3	International Match		NZ Football
2	13 October	Stade Pater Te Hono Nui, Pirae	Tahiti	2–0	2014 FIFA World Cup Qualifier		NZ Football
3	16 October	AMI Stadium, Christchurch	Tahiti	3–0	2014 FIFA World Cup Qualifier		NZ Football
4	14 November	Hongkou Football Stadium, Shanghai	China	1–1	Friendly		NZ Football
2013
5	26 March	Lawson Tama Stadium, Honiara	Solomon Islands	2–0	2014 FIFA World Cup Qualifier		NZ Football

=== International career statistics ===
New Zealand national team
Year	Apps	Goals
2012	4	0
2013	1	0
Total	5	0

== Honors ==
=== Los Angeles Galaxy ===
- MLS Cup (2): 2011, 2012
- Major League Soccer Supporters' Shield (1): 2011
- Major League Soccer Western Conference Championship (2): 2011, 2012

=== Falkenbergs FF ===
- Superettan: 2013 Superettan
