= Paolo Cardozo =

Uruguayan footballer (born 1989)

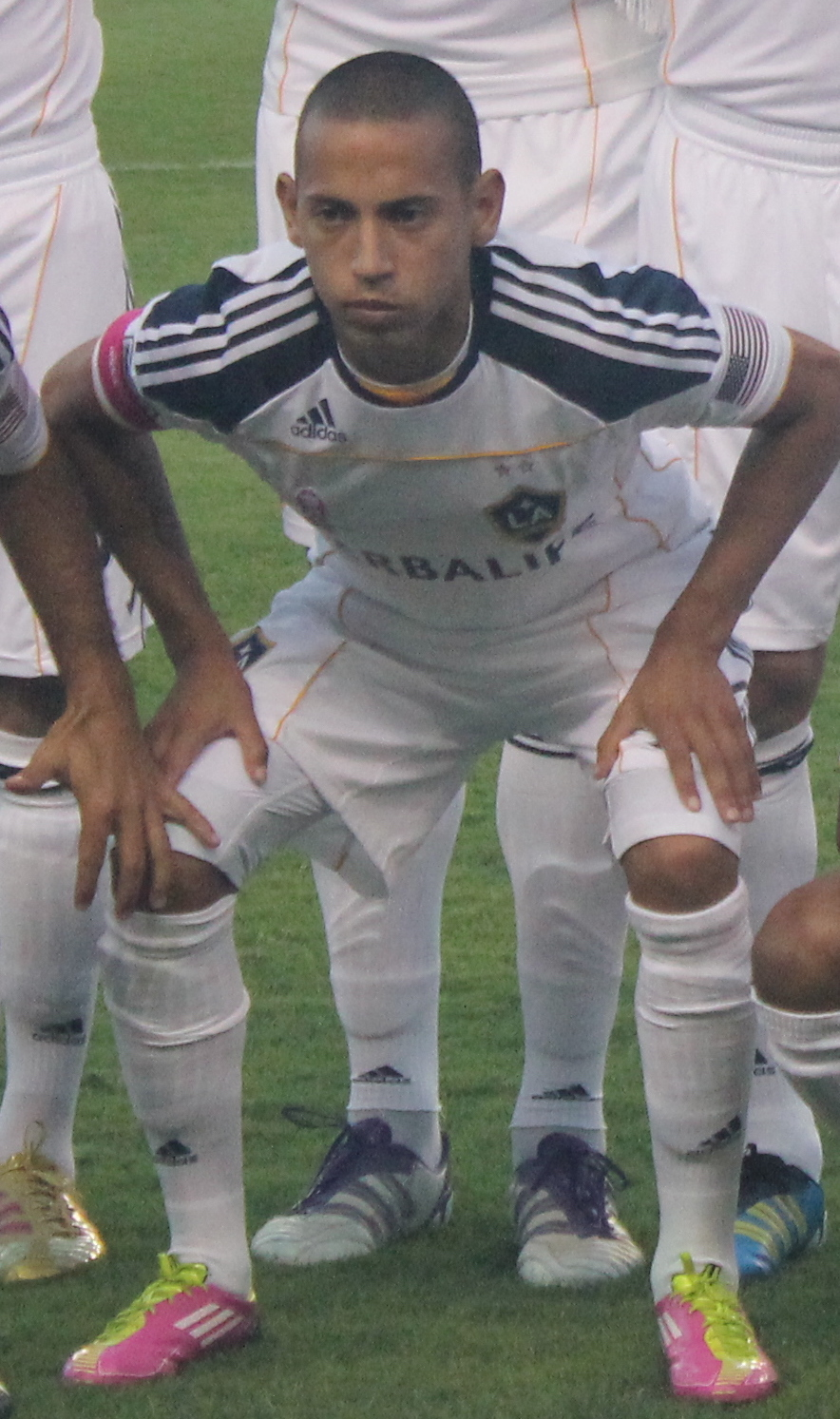

Personal information
- Full name: Paolo Daniel Cardozo
- Date of birth: June 9, 1989 (age 37)
- Place of birth: Montevideo, Uruguay
- Height: 1.65 m (5 ft 5 in)
- Position: Winger

Team information
- Current team: Olympians FC
- Number: 30

Youth career
- 1996–2008: River Plate
- 2009–2010: Quilmes

Senior career*
Years	Team	Apps	(Gls)
2010	Quilmes	1	(0)
2011–2012	LA Galaxy	18	(0)
2012	Chivas USA	9	(1)
2013–2014	Cartaginés	44	(6)
2015–2016	L.A. Wolves	9	(6)
2017	OC Invicta		
2017–2020	California United Strikers	42	(15)
2019	LA 10		
2020	Los Angeles Force	5	(0)
2022–	Olympians FC		
- * Club domestic league appearances and goals as of October 15, 2020

Paolo Daniel Cardozo (born June 9, 1989) is a Uruguayan footballer who plays for Olympians FC in the United Premier Soccer League.

== Career ==
=== Argentina ===
Cardozo started his career with the youth ranks of Argentine power Club Atlético River Plate. After impressing while at River, Cardozo moved to the reserve side of Quilmes. While with Quilmes, Cardozo quickly established himself as one of the top scorers in the highly successful Quilmes reserve side. As a result, he was signed to a full professional contract by Quilmes in June 2010. On January 31, 2010 Cardozo debuted for the senior side in a match against Boca Unidos.

=== United States ===
During the 2010 season Cardozo went on trial with Columbus Crew. In January 2011, after receiving limited first team action with Quilmes, Cardozo signed with Major League Soccer with hopes of being selected in the 2011 MLS SuperDraft. On January 13, he was selected by the Los Angeles Galaxy with the #16 pick of the first round of the MLS SuperDraft.

He made his debut for Galaxy on March 20, 2011, in a game against New England Revolution.

On April 10, 2012 Cardozo was traded to Chivas USA in exchange for David Lopes. Chivas USA released Cardozo on February 14, 2013.

Cardozo was named United Premier Soccer League 2017 Spring Season MVP on August 4, 2017. He tallied 14 goals and 18 assists to help the LA Wolves to their first UPSL Championship.

Cardozo transferred from Wolves to fellow UPSL side OC Invicta FC for the 2017 Fall Season. He was named national player of the week with Invicta on September 25, 2017.

In 2019, Cardozo played with LA 10 FC of the UPSL.

Following a 2020 stint in the National Independent Soccer Association with Los Angeles Force, Cardozo returned to the UPSL to play with Arizona club Olympians FC. Cardozo scored 7 times for Olympians during the 2022 Fall Season.

== Honours ==
=== Los Angeles Galaxy ===
- MLS Cup (1): 2011
- Major League Soccer Supporters' Shield (1): 2011
- Major League Soccer Western Conference Championship (1): 2011

=== California United FC II ===
United Premier Soccer League 2017 Spring Season Most Valuable Player (MVP) & member of the 2017 Fall & Spring UPSL National Championship teams.
