= Michael Stephens (soccer) =

American soccer player (born 1989)

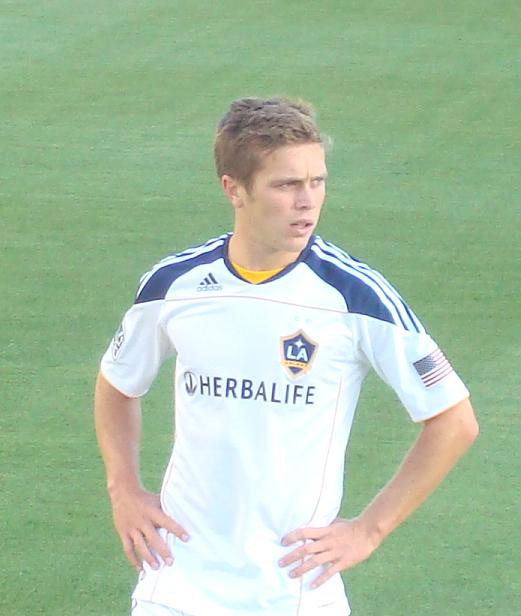
- Stephens with LA Galaxy in 2010

Personal information
- Full name: Michael Francis Stephens
- Date of birth: April 3, 1989 (age 37)
- Place of birth: Hinsdale, Illinois, United States
- Height: 5 ft 9 in (1.75 m)
- Position: Midfielder

Youth career
- 2004–2005: IMG Soccer Academy

College career
Years	Team	Apps	(Gls)
2006–2009	UCLA Bruins		

Senior career*
Years	Team	Apps	(Gls)
2007–2008	Chicago Fire Premier	8	(1)
2010–2013	LA Galaxy	94	(2)
2014	Stabæk	30	(1)
2015–2016	Chicago Fire	37	(0)
2017	San Francisco Deltas	26	(0)

International career^{‡}
2009	United States U20	5	(2)
2012	United States U23	2	(0)
- * Club domestic league appearances and goals as of October 30, 2017 ‡ National team caps and goals as of May 11, 2012

Michael Francis Stephens (born April 3, 1989) is an American former professional soccer player.

== Career ==
=== College and amateur ===
Stephens grew up in Naperville, Illinois, attended Edison Academic Center, and played four years of college soccer at UCLA. He was honored as UCLA's Rookie of the Year in 2006, while also being selected to the Top Drawer Soccer All-Freshman first team and to Soccer America's All-Freshman second team, playing in all 24 games in his rookie season.

He was named to the Soccer America MVP second-team in 2008, and became only the third player in Bruin history to earn Pac-10 Player of the Year honors. As a senior, he was named to the All-Pac-10 First-team and was a NSCAA All-Far West second-team honoree. He finished his UCLA career with 81 appearances, 11 goals and 20 assists.

During his college years Stephens also played two seasons with Chicago Fire Premier in the USL Premier Development League.

=== Professional ===
Stephens was drafted in the first round (16th overall) of the 2010 MLS SuperDraft by Los Angeles Galaxy. He made his professional debut on March 27, 2010, in Galaxy's opening game of the 2010 MLS season against New England Revolution.

In March 2014, Stephens signed a two-year contract with Norwegian Tippeligaen side Stabæk. After one season with Stabæk, Stephens returned to MLS on 9 December 2014, signing with Chicago Fire. After the end of 2016 season, Fire did not exercise his contract option and he became a free agent.

After his release from Chicago, Stephens joined North American Soccer League side San Francisco Deltas on January 6, 2017.

=== International ===
Stephens was a member of U.S. squad at the 2009 FIFA U-20 World Cup, having previously scored a goal in consecutive games against Costa Rica with the Under-20s in May. He was the US's starting forward in three games at the 2007 Pan American Games, and featured for the Under-18 National Team in 2006, scoring one goal with three assists. Previously, he had been a member of the U-17 National Team Residency Program from 2004 to 2006, and played with the U-15 and U-16 National Teams.

== Career statistics ==
As of 10 December 2016

Club	Season	League		Cup		Continental		Total	
Club	Season	Apps	Goals	Apps	Goals	Apps	Goals	Apps	Goals
LA Galaxy	2010	25	1	0	0	1	0	26	1
LA Galaxy	2011	27	0	2	0	4	0	33	0
LA Galaxy	2012	27	0	1	0	5	0	33	0
LA Galaxy	2013	21	1	1	0	7	0	29	1
LA Galaxy	Total	100	2	4	0	17	0	121	2
Stabæk	2014	30	1	4	0	-		34	1
Stabæk	Total	30	1	4	0	0	0	34	1
Chicago Fire	2015	20	0	2	0	-		22	0
Chicago Fire	2016	17	0	2	0	-		19	0
Chicago Fire	Total	37	0	4	0	0	0	41	0
Career Total		167	3	12	0	17	0	196	3

== Honors ==
=== Los Angeles Galaxy ===
- MLS Cup (2): 2011, 2012
- Major League Soccer Supporters' Shield (2): 2010, 2011
- Major League Soccer Western Conference Championship (2): 2011, 2012

=== San Francisco Deltas ===
- NASL Soccer Bowl (1): 2017
