= David Lopes =

Brazilian footballer (born 1982)

Personal information
- Full name: David Júnior Lopes
- Date of birth: 19 July 1982 (age 44)
- Place of birth: Maringá, Brazil
- Height: 1.90 m (6 ft 3 in)
- Position: Defender

Youth career
- 1992–2000: Adap Galo Maringá
- 2000–2002: Atl. Paranaense

Senior career*
Years	Team	Apps	(Gls)
2002–2003	Atl. Paranaense		
2003–2004	Porto B	5	(0)
2004–2005	Iraty	7	(0)
2005–2007	NK Osijek	35	(0)
2008	Terek Grozny	14	(0)
2009–2010	Córdoba	13	(1)
2010–2011	Universitatea Craiova	15	(0)
2011–2012	Chivas USA	8	(0)
2012	Los Angeles Galaxy	17	(0)
2016	Maringá	0	(0)
2016	Comercial	6	(0)
2018	União de Rondonópolis		
Total		120	(1)
- * Club domestic league appearances and goals as of 3 October 2019

David Júnior Lopes (born 19 July 1982) is a Brazilian former football defender.

== Career ==
David Júnior Lopes began his career in the youth ranks of Adap Galo Maringá Football Club and Clube Atlético Paranaense. He made his professional debut with Atlético Paranaense during the 2002/03 season. At mid season he signed with Portugal's F.C. Porto and was assigned to the B team.

After two years in Portugal, he returned to Brazil signing with Iraty SC. During the winter transfer period he returned to Europe signing with Croatian club NK Osijek. He was a regular for Osijek appearing in 35 league matches in his eighteen months at the club.

In 2008, he joined Russian league club FC Terek Grozny, participating in 14 matches with the club. During the winter transfer period he was again on the move, this time joining Spanish Second Division side Córdoba CF. He made his debut against Villarreal CF B scoring a goal in the match. At the end of the season he left the club and signed with Universitatea Craiova in Romania.

After one season in Romania the Brazilian defender signed with Chivas USA of Major League Soccer during the latter part of the 2011 season. He was traded to LA Galaxy on 10 April 2012 in exchange for Paolo Cardozo.

Lopes was released by Los Angeles at the end of the 2013 MLS season.

== Honours ==
Los Angeles Galaxy

- MLS Cup: 2012
