= Adam Cristman =

American soccer player

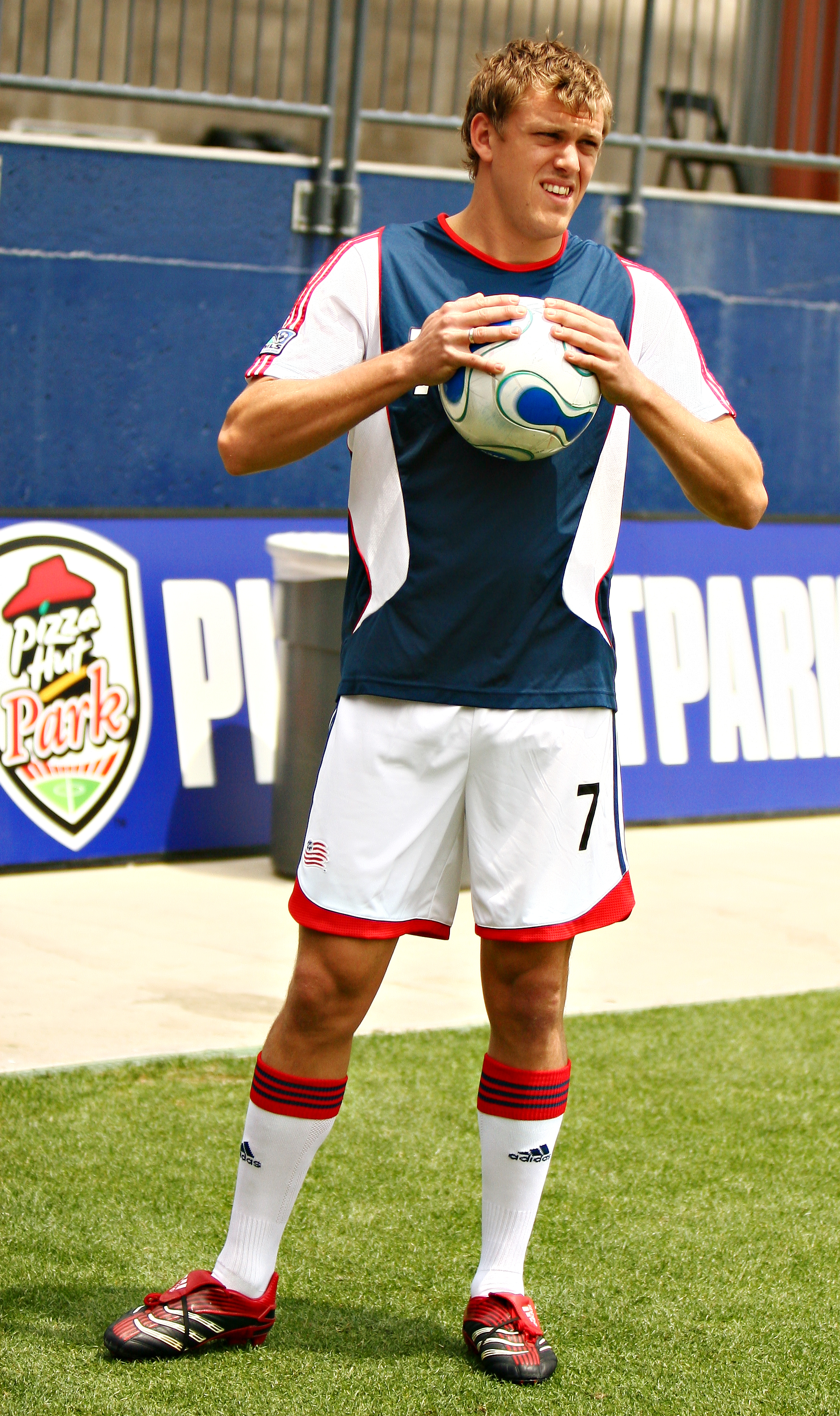
- Cristman as a player for the New England Revolution

Personal information
- Full name: Adam Cristman
- Date of birth: January 8, 1985 (age 41)
- Place of birth: Washington, D.C., United States
- Height: 6 ft 1 in (1.85 m)
- Position: Forward

Youth career
- 2003–2006: Virginia Cavaliers

Senior career*
Years	Team	Apps	(Gls)
2004	Richmond Kickers Future		
2007–2008	New England Revolution	46	(10)
2009	Kansas City Wizards	5	(0)
2010	D.C. United	17	(2)
2011–2012	Los Angeles Galaxy	13	(1)
Total		81	(13)

International career^{‡}
	United States U18	31	(4)
- United States U23
- * Club domestic league appearances and goals as of July 4, 2012 ‡ National team caps and goals as of July 4, 2012

Adam Cristman (born January 8, 1985) is an American former professional soccer player.

== Career ==
=== Youth and college ===
Cristman graduated from Mills Godwin High School in Richmond, Virginia, where as a senior in 2003 he helped seal a perfect 22–0–0 record for the team on way to an AAA state championship and No. 1 national ranking. He played college soccer at the University of Virginia, where he scored 34 career goals and accumulated 15 assists. During his college years Cristman also played for the Richmond Strikers and Richmond Kickers Future in the USL Premier Development League.

=== Professional ===
Cristman was selected in the fourth round of the 2007 MLS SuperDraft by New England Revolution and signed a developmental contract with the club. He began his debut season as a starter with Pat Noonan out with injury, and later settled into a role as a regular sub and spot starter, appearing in almost every game of the season. His solid play quickly earned him a bump up to the senior roster in midseason.

After the 2008 season, Cristman was traded to Kansas City Wizards for allocation money and a third round 2009 MLS SuperDraft selection. On July 25, 2009, after being plagued by injury for the first few months of the year, he made his debut coming on as a second-half sub in an MLS game against LA Galaxy.

In February 2010, D.C. United acquired Cristman from Kansas City in exchange for use of an international roster slot through December 31, 2011.

On January 11, 2011, Cristman was traded to Los Angeles Galaxy in exchange for the Galaxy's first-round pick in the 2011 MLS Supplemental Draft. After an extended layoff while he recovered from a knee injury, Cristman made his Galaxy debut on June 3, 2011, as a late substitute in a 0–0 tie with D.C. United.

He signed a new contract with Los Angeles on December 23, 2011.

On July 3, 2012, Cristman retired from professional soccer due to injuries (multiple concussions).

=== International ===
Cristman has played for the US national U-18 and U-23 teams.

== Honors ==
=== New England Revolution ===
- Lamar Hunt U.S. Open Cup (1): 2007
- North American SuperLiga (1): 2008

=== Los Angeles Galaxy ===
- MLS Cup (1): 2011
- Major League Soccer Supporters' Shield (1): 2011
- Major League Soccer Western Conference Championship (1): 2011
