= 2011 Major League Soccer season =

16th season of Major League Soccer

Major League Soccer
- Season: 2011
- Teams: 18
- MLS Cup: LA Galaxy (3rd title)
- Supporters' Shield: LA Galaxy (4th shield)
- Champions League (U.S.): LA Galaxy; Seattle Sounders FC (via U.S. Open Cup); Real Salt Lake; Houston Dynamo
- Champions League (Canada): Toronto FC (via Canadian Championship)
- Matches: 306
- Goals: 791 (2.58 per match)
- Top goalscorer: Dwayne De Rosario and Chris Wondolowski (16 goals)
- Biggest home win: NY 5–0 TOR (July 6)
- Biggest away win: DCU 0–4 NY (April 21); TOR 2–6 PHI (May 28); VAN 0–4 LA (July 30)
- Highest scoring: 8 goals: TOR 2–6 PHI (May 28); SEA 6–2 CLB (August 27); PHI 4–4 NE (September 7)
- Longest winning run: 5 matches: Real Salt Lake (August 27 – Sep 21)
- Longest unbeaten run: 14 matches: LA Galaxy (May 7 – July 30); Sporting KC (May 28 – August 3)
- Longest winless run: 14 matches: Vancouver Whitecaps FC (March 26 – June 11)
- Longest losing run: 5 matches: Sporting KC (April 16 – May 21); New England Revolution(September 16 – October 15)
- Highest attendance: 64,140; SJ @ SEA
- Lowest attendance: 6,680; TOR @ NE
- Average attendance: 17,872

Locations of teams for the 2011 Major League Soccer season
Western Conference Eastern Conference

The 2011 Major League Soccer season was the 16th season of Major League Soccer. It was also the 99th season of FIFA-sanctioned soccer in the United States, and the 33rd with a national first-division league.

This season marked the arrival of two new clubs, the Portland Timbers and Vancouver Whitecaps FC, who replaced teams of the same name that last played in the USSF D2 Pro League. The addition of those two clubs led to a realignment of the league's conferences, with the Houston Dynamo moving to the Eastern Conference to create two conferences of nine teams each.

The Kansas City Wizards rebranded as Sporting Kansas City, which coincided with its move to its new stadium, Livestrong Sporting Park.

The MLS Reserve League returned this season after previously disbanding following the 2008 season.

The regular season began on March 15 and concluded on October 23. The MLS Cup Playoffs began on October 26 and ended on November 20, when the LA Galaxy claimed their third league title by defeating the Houston Dynamo, 1–0, in MLS Cup.

== Overview ==
=== Season format ===
The season began on March 15 and concluded with MLS Cup on November 20. The 18 teams were split evenly into two conferences. Each team played 34 games that were evenly divided between home and away. Each team played every other team in the league twice.

This was the first playoffs to include ten teams. The top three teams in each conference earned a bye to the conference semifinals, while the next four teams with the most points earned wild card berths. The wild card round included two single-elimination matches where the winners advanced to the conference semifinals. In all rounds, draws were broken with two 15-minute periods of extra time, followed by penalty kicks if necessary. The away goals rule was not used in any round.

The team with the most points in the regular season was awarded the MLS Supporters' Shield and qualified for the CONCACAF Champions League. Additionally, the winner of MLS Cup, and the runner-up, also qualified for the CONCACAF Champions League. An additional berth in the Champions League was also awarded to the winner of the U.S. Open Cup. If a team qualified for multiple berths into the Champions League, then additional berths were awarded to the highest overall finishing MLS team(s) not already qualified. Also, Toronto FC and the Vancouver Whitecaps FC, as Canadian-based teams, could not qualify for the CONCACAF Champions League through MLS, and had to instead qualify through the Canadian Championship.

=== Roster rule changes ===
Team rosters were expanded to 30 players in order to accommodate the re-introduction of the MLS Reserve League. Of these 30 players, 18–20 count against a club's salary cap of $2,675,000. Clubs may still have a maximum of three Designated Players per club, each of whom counts $335,000 for salary cap purposes. The transfer windows for acquisition of players under contract in another country run from January 21 to April 15 and from July 15 to August 14.

Other key roster rule changes were the introduction of Off-Budget players who do not count against a club's salary cap; the ability of clubs to forgo fielding a full roster of 30 players for salary reasons; the introduction of roster slots paid below last year's league minimum; the ability of the two Canadian clubs to count U.S. domestic players as domestic players for roster purposes; and the ability of clubs to buy out one guaranteed player contract during the off-season and free up the corresponding budget space.

=== Stadiums and locations ===
Team	Stadium	Capacity
Chicago Fire	Toyota Park	20,000
Chivas USA	Home Depot Center	27,000
Colorado Rapids	Dick's Sporting Goods Park	18,061
Columbus Crew	Columbus Crew Stadium	22,555
D.C. United	RFK Stadium	45,596
FC Dallas	Pizza Hut Park	21,193
Houston Dynamo	Robertson Stadium	32,000
LA Galaxy	Home Depot Center	27,000
New England Revolution	Gillette Stadium	68,756
New York Red Bulls	Red Bull Arena	25,000
Philadelphia Union	PPL Park	18,500
Portland Timbers	Jeld-Wen Field	18,627
Real Salt Lake	Rio Tinto Stadium	20,213
San Jose Earthquakes	Buck Shaw Stadium	10,525
Seattle Sounders FC	Qwest Field	68,740
Sporting Kansas City	Livestrong Sporting Park	18,467
Toronto FC	BMO Field	21,566
Vancouver Whitecaps FC	Empire Field; BC Place	27,528; 22,120

=== Personnel and sponsorships ===
Note: Flags indicate national team as has been defined under FIFA eligibility rules. Players and Managers may hold more than one non-FIFA nationality.

Team	Head coach	Captain	Shirt sponsor
Chicago Fire	(United States) Frank Klopas	(United States) Logan Pause	—
Chivas USA	(United States) Robin Fraser	(New Zealand) Simon Elliott	Corona
Colorado Rapids	(England) Gary Smith	(United States) Pablo Mastroeni	—
Columbus Crew	(Poland) Robert Warzycha	(United States) Chad Marshall	—
D.C. United	(United States) Ben Olsen	(United States) Josh Wolff	Volkswagen
FC Dallas	(United States) Schellas Hyndman	(United States) Daniel Hernández	—
Houston Dynamo	(United States) Dominic Kinnear	(United States) Brian Ching	Greenstar Recycling
LA Galaxy	(United States) Bruce Arena	(United States) Landon Donovan	Herbalife
New England Revolution	(Scotland) Steve Nicol	(Grenada) Shalrie Joseph	UnitedHealthcare
New York Red Bulls	(Sweden) Hans Backe	(France) Thierry Henry	Red Bull
Philadelphia Union	(Poland) Piotr Nowak	(Colombia) Faryd Mondragón	Bimbo
Portland Timbers	(Scotland) John Spencer	(United States) Jack Jewsbury	Alaska Airlines
Real Salt Lake	(United States) Jason Kreis	(United States) Kyle Beckerman	XanGo
San Jose Earthquakes	(Canada) Frank Yallop	(United States) Ramiro Corrales	Amway Global
Seattle Sounders FC	(United States) Sigi Schmid	(United States) Kasey Keller	Xbox
Sporting Kansas City	(United States) Peter Vermes	(United States) Davy Arnaud	—
Toronto FC	(Netherlands) Aron Winter	(Germany) Torsten Frings	Bank of Montreal
Vancouver Whitecaps FC	(United States) Tom Soehn	(United States) Jay DeMerit	Bell Canada

=== Managerial changes ===
Team	Outgoing coach	Manner of departure	Date of vacancy	Table	Incoming coach	Date of appointment	Table
Portland Timbers	Expansion club				(Scotland) John Spencer	August 10, 2010	Pre-season
Chivas USA	(United States) Martín Vásquez	Fired	October 27, 2010	8th West ('10)	(United States) Robin Fraser	January 4, 2011	Pre-season
Toronto FC	(Canada) Nick Dasovic	End of interim period	September 14, 2010	5th East ('09)	(Netherlands) Aron Winter	January 6, 2011	Pre-season
Vancouver Whitecaps FC	(Iceland) Teitur Thordarson	Fired	May 29, 2011	9th West ('11)	(United States) Tom Soehn	May 29, 2011	9th West ('11)
Chicago Fire	(Mexico) Carlos de los Cobos	Fired	May 30, 2011	8th East ('11)	(United States) Frank Klopas	May 30, 2011	8th East ('11)

== Results table ==
Home \ Away	CHI	CHV	COL	CLB	DCU	FCD	HOU	LAG	NER	NY	PHI	POR	RSL	SJE	SEA	SKC	TOR	VAN
Chicago Fire		3–2	2–0	3–2	1–1	1–2	1–1	1–2	3–2	1–1	1–1	0–1	0–0	2–2	0–0	3–2	2–0	0–0
Chivas USA	1–1		0–1	0–0	0–3	1–2	3–0	0–1	3–0	0–0	1–1	1–0	0–1	2–0	1–3	2–3	3–0	1–1
Colorado Rapids	1–1	2–2		2–0	4–1	1–0	0–0	1–3	2–2	4–1	1–1	3–1	0–0	1–1	0–1	1–1	0–0	2–1
Columbus Crew	0–1	3–3	4–1		2–1	2–0	2–2	0–1	3–1	0–0	2–1	1–0	2–1	0–0	1–1	1–0	2–4	2–1
D.C. United	1–2	2–2	1–1	3–1		0–0	2–2	1–1	0–1	0–4	2–2	1–1	4–1	2–4	2–1	0–1	3–3	4–0
FC Dallas	1–1	1–0	3–0	2–0	0–0		0–1	2–1	1–0	0–1	2–0	4–0	0–0	0–2	0–1	1–4	1–0	2–0
Houston Dynamo	1–1	2–1	1–2	0–2	4–1	2–2		3–1	1–0	2–2	0–1	2–1	3–2	2–1	3–1	1–1	2–0	3–1
LA Galaxy	2–1	1–0	1–0	1–0	0–0	3–1	1–0		1–1	1–1	1–0	3–0	2–1	2–0	0–0	4–1	2–2	3–0
New England Revolution	1–1	2–3	0–0	0–3	2–1	2–0	1–1	0–1		2–2	4–4	1–1	0–2	1–2	1–2	3–2	0–0	1–0
New York Red Bulls	2–2	2–3	2–2	1–1	0–1	2–2	1–1	2–0	2–1		1–0	2–0	1–3	3–0	1–0	1–0	5–0	1–1
Philadelphia Union	2–1	3–2	1–2	1–0	3–2	2–2	1–1	1–1	3–0	1–0		0–0	1–1	1–0	1–1	0–0	1–1	1–0
Portland Timbers	4–2	1–0	0–1	1–0	2–3	3–2	0–2	3–0	3–0	3–3	1–0		1–0	1–1	2–3	1–2	2–2	2–1
Real Salt Lake	0–3	1–0	1–0	0–2	1–1	2–0	0–0	4–1	3–3	3–0	2–1	1–1		4–0	1–2	1–0	3–1	2–0
San Jose Earthquakes	2–0	1–2	1–2	3–0	0–2	4–2	2–0	0–0	2–1	2–2	0–0	1–1	0–1		2–2	1–1	1–1	2–2
Seattle Sounders FC	2–1	0–0	4–3	6–2	3–0	0–1	1–1	0–1	2–1	4–2	0–2	1–1	1–2	2–1		1–0	3–0	2–2
Sporting Kansas City	0–0	1–1	1–1	2–1	1–0	2–3	3–0	2–2	1–1	2–0	1–1	3–1	2–0	1–0	1–2		4–2	2–1
Toronto FC	2–2	1–1	2–1	1–1	0–3	0–1	2–1	0–0	2–2	1–1	2–6	2–0	1–0	1–1	0–1	0–0		1–0
Vancouver Whitecaps FC	4–2	0–0	1–2	0–1	2–1	1–2	1–0	0–4	1–1	1–1	1–0	0–1	3–0	1–1	1–3	3–3	4–2	

Updated to match(es) played on October 20, 2011. Source: official website
Legend: Blue = home team win; Yellow = draw; Red = away team win.

== Standings ==
=== Eastern Conference ===
Pos	Team	Pld	W	L	T	GF	GA	GD	Pts	Qualification
1	Sporting Kansas City	34	13	9	12	50	40	+10	51	MLS Cup Conference Semifinals
2	Houston Dynamo	34	12	9	13	45	41	+4	49	MLS Cup Conference Semifinals
3	Philadelphia Union	34	11	8	15	44	36	+8	48	MLS Cup Conference Semifinals
4	Columbus Crew	34	13	13	8	43	44	−1	47	MLS Cup Play-In Round
5	New York Red Bulls	34	10	8	16	50	44	+6	46	MLS Cup Play-In Round
6	Chicago Fire	34	9	9	16	46	45	+1	43	
7	D.C. United	34	9	13	12	49	52	−3	39	
8	Toronto FC	34	6	13	15	36	59	−23	33	
9	New England Revolution	34	5	16	13	38	58	−20	28	

Source: MLS

=== Western Conference ===
Pos	Team	Pld	W	L	T	GF	GA	GD	Pts	Qualification
1	LA Galaxy	34	19	5	10	48	28	+20	67	MLS Cup Conference Semifinals
2	Seattle Sounders FC	34	18	7	9	56	37	+19	63	MLS Cup Conference Semifinals
3	Real Salt Lake	34	15	11	8	44	36	+8	53	MLS Cup Conference Semifinals
4	FC Dallas	34	15	12	7	42	39	+3	52	MLS Cup Play-In Round
5	Colorado Rapids	34	12	9	13	46	42	+4	49	MLS Cup Play-In Round
6	Portland Timbers	34	11	14	9	40	48	−8	42	
7	San Jose Earthquakes	34	8	12	14	40	45	−5	38	
8	Chivas USA	34	8	14	12	41	43	−2	36	
9	Vancouver Whitecaps FC	34	6	18	10	35	55	−20	28	

Source: MLS

=== Overall standings ===
Pos	Team	Pld	W	L	T	GF	GA	GD	Pts	Qualification
1	LA Galaxy (S, C)	34	19	5	10	48	28	+20	67	CONCACAF Champions League
2	Seattle Sounders FC	34	18	7	9	56	37	+19	63	CONCACAF Champions League
3	Real Salt Lake	34	15	11	8	44	36	+8	53	CONCACAF Champions League
4	FC Dallas	34	15	12	7	42	39	+3	52	
5	Sporting Kansas City	34	13	9	12	50	40	+10	51	
6	Houston Dynamo	34	12	9	13	45	41	+4	49	CONCACAF Champions League
7	Colorado Rapids	34	12	9	13	44	41	+3	49	
8	Philadelphia Union	34	11	8	15	44	36	+8	48	
9	Columbus Crew	34	13	13	8	43	44	−1	47	
10	New York Red Bulls	34	10	8	16	50	44	+6	46	
11	Chicago Fire	34	9	9	16	46	45	+1	43	
12	Portland Timbers	34	11	14	9	40	48	−8	42	
13	D.C. United	34	9	13	12	49	52	−3	39	
14	San Jose Earthquakes	34	8	12	14	40	45	−5	38	
15	Chivas USA	34	8	14	12	41	43	−2	36	
16	Toronto FC	34	6	13	15	36	59	−23	33	CONCACAF Champions League
17	New England Revolution	34	5	16	13	38	58	−20	28	
18	Vancouver Whitecaps FC	34	6	18	10	35	55	−20	28	

Source: MLS
Rules for classification: 1) points; 2) head-to-head record; 3) goal difference; 4) number of goals scored
(C) Champions; (S) Supporters' Shield

== MLS Cup playoffs ==
=== Bracket ===
Play-in round
8	Colorado Rapids	1
9	Columbus Crew	0
7	FC Dallas	0
10	New York Red Bulls	2

Conference semifinals
E1	Sporting Kansas City	2	2
WC	Colorado Rapids	0	0
Eastern Conference
E2	Houston Dynamo	2	1
E3	Philadelphia Union	1	0
W1	LA Galaxy	1	2
WC	New York Red Bulls	0	1
Western Conference
W2	Seattle Sounders FC	0	2
W3	Real Salt Lake	3	0

Conference finals
E1	Sporting Kansas City	0
E2	Houston Dynamo	2
W3	Real Salt Lake	1
W1	LA Galaxy	3

MLS Cup
E2	Houston Dynamo	0
W1	LA Galaxy	1

== Player statistics ==
=== Goals ===
Rank	Player	Club	Goals
1	(Canada) Dwayne De Rosario	D.C. United	16
1	(United States) Chris Wondolowski	San Jose Earthquakes	16
3	(France) Thierry Henry	New York Red Bulls	14
4	(Peru) Andrés Mendoza	Columbus Crew	13
5	(Brazil) Camilo Sanvezzo	Vancouver Whitecaps FC	12
5	(United States) Landon Donovan	LA Galaxy	12
5	(Colombia) Fredy Montero	Seattle Sounders FC	12
5	(Ghana) Dominic Oduro	Chicago Fire	12
9	(United States) Charlie Davies	D.C. United	11
9	(France) Sébastien Le Toux	Philadelphia Union	11
9	(Costa Rica) Álvaro Saborío	Real Salt Lake	11
9	(United States) Brek Shea	FC Dallas	11

=== Assists ===
Rank	Player	Club	Goals
1	(United States) Brad Davis	Houston Dynamo	16
2	(England) David Beckham	LA Galaxy	15
3	(Argentina) Mauro Rosales	Seattle Sounders FC	13
4	(Canada) Dwayne De Rosario	D.C. United	12
5	(United States) Kyle Beckerman	Real Salt Lake	9
5	(Switzerland) Davide Chiumiento	Vancouver Whitecaps FC	9
5	(France) Sébastien Le Toux	Philadelphia Union	9
5	(Colombia) Fredy Montero	Seattle Sounders FC	9
5	(Ghana) Patrick Nyarko	Chicago Fire	9
10	(United States) Jack Jewsbury	Portland Timbers	8

=== Clean sheets ===
Rank	Player	Club	Clean sheets
1	(United States) Kevin Hartman	FC Dallas	13
1	(United States) Nick Rimando	Real Salt Lake	13
3	(United States) Kasey Keller	Seattle Sounders FC	9
3	(United States) Dan Kennedy	Chivas USA	9
3	(United States) Troy Perkins	Portland Timbers	9
6	(United States) Will Hesmer	Columbus Crew	8
6	(Denmark) Jimmy Nielsen	Sporting Kansas City	8
6	(United States) Matt Pickens	Colorado Rapids	8
6	(Puerto Rico) Josh Saunders	LA Galaxy	8
10	(United States) Jon Busch	San Jose Earthquakes	7
10	(United States) Bill Hamid	D.C. United	7
10	(United States) Sean Johnson	Chicago Fire	7
10	(Colombia) Faryd Mondragón	Philadelphia Union	7
10	(Jamaica) Donovan Ricketts	LA Galaxy	7

== Awards ==
=== Individual awards ===
Award	Player	Club
Most Valuable Player	(Canada) Dwayne De Rosario	D.C. United
Defender of the Year	(United States) Omar Gonzalez	LA Galaxy
Goalkeeper of the Year	(United States) Kasey Keller	Seattle Sounders FC
Coach of the Year	(United States) Bruce Arena	LA Galaxy
Rookie of the Year	(United States) C.J. Sapong	Sporting Kansas City
Newcomer of the Year	(Argentina) Mauro Rosales	Seattle Sounders FC
Comeback Player of the Year	(England) David Beckham	LA Galaxy
Golden Boot	(Canada) Dwayne De Rosario	D.C. United
Goal of the Year	(United States) Darlington Nagbe	Portland Timbers
Save of the Year	(United States) Kasey Keller	Seattle Sounders FC
Fair Play Award	(France) Sébastien Le Toux	Philadelphia Union
Humanitarian of the Year	(United States) Zak Boggs	New England Revolution

=== Best XI ===
Goalkeeper	Defenders	Midfielders	Forwards
(United States) Kasey Keller, Seattle	(United States) Todd Dunivant, LA Galaxy (United States) Omar Gonzalez, LA Galaxy (Colombia) Jámison Olave, Salt Lake	(England) David Beckham, LA Galaxy (United States) Brad Davis, Houston (Canada) Dwayne De Rosario, D.C. United (United States) Landon Donovan, LA Galaxy (United States) Brek Shea, Dallas	(France) Thierry Henry, Red Bulls (United States) Chris Wondolowski, San Jose

=== Player of the Month ===
Month	Player	Club	Stats
March	(United States) Nick Rimando	Real Salt Lake	1GA
April	(United States) Brad Davis	Houston Dynamo	6A
May	(United States) Landon Donovan	LA Galaxy	6G
June	(United States) Graham Zusi	Sporting Kansas City	2G, 3A
July	(United States) Kevin Hartman	FC Dallas	4GA
August	(Canada) Dwayne De Rosario	D.C. United	3G, 2A
September	(France) Sébastien Le Toux	Philadelphia Union	7G
October	(United States) Chris Wondolowski	San Jose Earthquakes	5G

=== Weekly awards ===
Week	Player of the Week		AT&T Goal of the Week		MLS Save of the Week	
Week	Player	Club	Player	Club	Player	Club
Week 1	(Mexico) Omar Bravo	Sporting Kansas City	(United States) Juan Agudelo	New York Red Bulls	(United States) Nick Rimando	Real Salt Lake
Week 2	(Argentina) Javier Morales	Real Salt Lake	(Netherlands) Javier Martina	Toronto FC	(New Zealand) Jake Gleeson	Portland Timbers
Week 3	(Brazil) Camilo	Vancouver Whitecaps FC	(Jamaica) Khari Stephenson	San Jose Earthquakes	(United States) Kasey Keller	Seattle Sounders FC
Week 4	(Colombia) David Ferreira	FC Dallas	(Jamaica) O'Brian White	Seattle Sounders FC	(United States) Kasey Keller	Seattle Sounders FC
Week 5	(England) Luke Rodgers	New York Red Bulls	(Colombia) Jorge Perlaza	Portland Timbers	(New Zealand) Jake Gleeson	Portland Timbers
Week 6	(United States) Landon Donovan	Los Angeles Galaxy	(United States) Juan Agudelo	New York Red Bulls	(Jamaica) Donovan Ricketts	Los Angeles Galaxy
Week 7	(United States) Will Bruin	Houston Dynamo	(United States) Brek Shea	FC Dallas	(United States) Bobby Shuttleworth	New England Revolution
Week 8	(Ecuador) Joao Plata	Toronto FC	(France) Thierry Henry	New York Red Bulls	(United States) Tim Ream	New York Red Bulls
Week 9	(United States) Justin Braun	Chivas USA	(England) David Beckham	Los Angeles Galaxy	(Switzerland) Stefan Frei	Toronto FC
Week 10	(United States) Jeff Parke	Seattle Sounders FC	(Guatemala) Carlos Ruiz	Philadelphia Union	(United States) Troy Perkins	Portland Timbers
Week 11	(United States) Justin Mapp	Philadelphia Union	(United States) Lamar Neagle	Seattle Sounders FC	(United States) Donovan & DeLaGarza	Los Angeles Galaxy
Week 12	(Haiti) Jean Alexandre	Real Salt Lake	(Haiti) Jean Alexandre	Real Salt Lake	(United States) Kasey Keller	Seattle Sounders FC
Week 13	(United States) Steven Lenhart	San Jose Earthquakes	(France) Eric Hassli	Vancouver Whitecaps FC	(Canada) Greg Sutton	New York Red Bulls
Week 14	(Venezuela) Bernardo Anor	Columbus Crew	(Colombia) Fredy Montero	Seattle Sounders FC	(Finland) Teemu Tainio	New York Red Bulls
Week 15	(United States) Mike Magee	Los Angeles Galaxy	(United States) Tyson Wahl	Seattle Sounders FC	(United States) Mike Magee	Los Angeles Galaxy
Week 16	(Estonia) Joel Lindpere	New York Red Bulls	(Liberia) Darlington Nagbe	Portland Timbers	(United States) Brian Perk	Los Angeles Galaxy
Week 17	(Colombia) Fredy Montero	Seattle Sounders FC	(England) David Beckham	Los Angeles Galaxy	(United States) Troy Perkins	Portland Timbers
Week 18	(Argentina) Mauro Rosales	Seattle Sounders FC	(Guatemala) Carlos Ruiz	Philadelphia Union	(United States) Troy Perkins	Portland Timbers
Week 19	(The Gambia) Sanna Nyassi	Colorado Rapids	(Sierra Leone) Kei Kamara	Sporting Kansas City	(Denmark) Jimmy Nielsen	Sporting Kansas City
Week 20	(Canada) Dwayne De Rosario	D.C. United	(Colombia) Roger Torres	Philadelphia Union	(United States) Andy Gruenebaum	Columbus Crew
Week 21	(Canada) Dwayne De Rosario	D.C. United	(United States) Luis Gil	Real Salt Lake	(Denmark) Jimmy Nielsen	Sporting Kansas City
Week 22	(United States) Chris Pontius	D.C. United	(Scotland) Adam Moffat	Houston Dynamo	(Serbia) Miloš Kocić	Toronto FC
Week 23	(United States) Graham Zusi	Sporting Kansas City	(United States) Graham Zusi	Sporting Kansas City	(United States) Kasey Keller	Seattle Sounders FC
Week 24	(United States) Lamar Neagle	Seattle Sounders FC	(United States) Lamar Neagle	Seattle Sounders FC	(United States) Nick Rimando	Real Salt Lake
Week 25	No award given		(United States) Kyle Beckerman	Real Salt Lake	(Denmark) Jimmy Nielsen	Sporting Kansas City
Week 26	(United States) Charlie Davies	D.C. United	(Switzerland) Davide Chiumiento	Vancouver Whitecaps FC	(United States) Joe Cannon	Vancouver Whitecaps FC
Week 27	(Netherlands) Danny Koevermans	Toronto FC	(Uruguay) Álvaro Fernández	Seattle Sounders FC	(United States) Zac MacMath	Philadelphia Union
Week 28	(Canada) Dwayne De Rosario	D.C. United	(Colombia) Fredy Montero	Seattle Sounders FC	(United States) Troy Perkins	Portland Timbers
Week 29	(Guatemala) Marco Pappa	Chicago Fire	(United States) Kenny Cooper	Portland Timbers	(United States) Nick Rimando	Real Salt Lake
Week 30	No award given		(United States) Chris Wondolowski	San Jose Earthquakes	(United States) Kasey Keller	Seattle Sounders FC
Week 31	(United States) Kasey Keller	Seattle Sounders FC	(United States) Danny Cruz	Houston Dynamo	(United States) Kasey Keller	Seattle Sounders FC
Week 32	(United States) Jalil Anibaba	Chicago Fire	(Scotland) Adam Moffat	Houston Dynamo	(Denmark) Jimmy Nielsen	Sporting Kansas City

== Transfers ==
Major League Soccer employs no fewer than 12 methods to acquire players. These include: signing players on transfers/free transfers as is done in most of the world; via trades; drafting players through mechanisms such as the MLS SuperDraft, MLS Supplemental Draft, or MLS Re-Entry Draft; rarely used methods which cover extreme hardship and injury replacement; signing players as Designated Players or Homegrown Players; placing a discovery claim on players; waivers; and methods peculiar to MLS such as through allocation or a weighted lottery.

=== Allocation ranking ===
The allocation ranking is the mechanism used to determine which MLS club has first priority to acquire a U.S. National Team player who signs with MLS after playing abroad, or a former MLS player who returns to the League after having gone to a club abroad for a transfer fee. The allocation rankings may also be used in the event two or more clubs file a request for the same player on the same day. The allocations will be ranked in reverse order of finish for the 2010 season, taking playoff performance into account.

Once the club uses its allocation ranking to acquire a player, it drops to the bottom of the list. A ranking can be traded, provided that part of the compensation received in return is another club's ranking. At all times, each club is assigned one ranking. The rankings reset at the end of each MLS League season.

Original ranking	Club	Date allocation used	Player signed	Previous club	Ref
1	Vancouver Whitecaps FC	November 18, 2010	(United States) Jay DeMerit	(England) Watford	
2	Portland Timbers	January 17, 2011	(United States) Kenny Cooper	(Germany) 1860 Munich	
3	D.C. United	February 16, 2011	(United States) Charlie Davies	(France) Sochaux¤	
4	Chivas USA				
5	Philadelphia Union	August 12, 2011	(United States) Freddy Adu	(Portugal) Benfica	
6	New England Revolution	April 19, 2011	(United States) Benny Feilhaber	(Denmark) AGF Aarhus	
7	Houston Dynamo				
8	Toronto FC				
9	Seattle Sounders FC¤¤	August 26, 2011	(United States) Sammy Ochoa	(Mexico) Estudiantes Tecos	
10	Sporting Kansas City				

¤ Davies was signed by United on a twelve-month loan deal.
¤¤ Chicago originally had the No. 9 ranking but traded it to Seattle on August 26, 2011.

The remaining order after Sporting Kansas City is: Chicago Fire¤¤, Columbus Crew, New York Red Bulls, Real Salt Lake, San Jose Earthquakes, Los Angeles Galaxy, FC Dallas, and Colorado Rapids. In the unlikely event that all clubs use an allocation, the order begins anew with Vancouver Whitecaps FC.

=== Weighted lottery ===
Some players are assigned to MLS teams via a weighted lottery process. A team can only acquire one player per year through a weighted lottery. The players made available through lotteries include: (i) Generation adidas players signed after the MLS SuperDraft; and (ii) Draft eligible players to whom an MLS contract was offered but who failed to sign with the League prior to the SuperDraft.

The team with the worst record over its last 30 regular season games (dating back to previous season if necessary and taking playoff performance into account) will have the greatest probability of winning the lottery. Teams are not required to participate in a lottery. Players are assigned via the lottery system in order to prevent a player from potentially influencing his destination club with a strategic holdout.

The results of 2011 weighted lotteries:

Lottery Date	Player	Position	Winning Club	Other Clubs Participating	Ref
January 26, 2011	(United States) David Bingham	GK	San Jose Earthquakes	New England Revolution, Toronto FC, Chicago Fire, Seattle Sounders FC, Columbus Crew, New York Red Bulls, Colorado Rapids, FC Dallas, Real Salt Lake, Los Angeles Galaxy, Portland Timbers, Vancouver Whitecaps FC	
February 11, 2011	(United States) Cody Arnoux	FW	Real Salt Lake	Houston Dynamo, Seattle Sounders FC, Columbus Crew, Portland Timbers, Vancouver Whitecaps FC	
February 14, 2011	(United States) Chris Agorsor	FW	Philadelphia Union	Portland Timbers, Vancouver Whitecaps FC	
February 15, 2011	(United States) Korey Veeder	DF	Columbus Crew	Toronto FC, Seattle Sounders FC, Colorado Rapids	
July 5, 2011	(United States) Soony Saad	FW	Sporting Kansas City	Chivas USA, Chicago Fire, Portland Timbers	

== Related competitions ==
=== International competitions ===
==== CONCACAF Champions League ====
Prior to the start of the MLS regular season, Columbus Crew and Real Salt Lake played against each other in the quarterfinals of 2010–11 edition of the CONCACAF Champions League. The first leg, contested at Crew Stadium on February 22, 2011; ended in a scoreless draw between the sides. On March 1, 2011; the second leg at Rio Tinto Stadium was played, where Real Salt Lake won the series against the Crew 4–1 in the game and on aggregate, this ending Columbus' Champions League campaign.

As a result, Salt Lake became the first MLS team to advance into the semifinals of the Champions League under its current format. The team won its home fixture against Saprissa of Costa Rica 2–0 on March 15, 2011. Real Salt Lake lost the away fixture 2–1 on April 5, 2011, but advanced 3–2 on aggregate. They faced Monterrey of Mexico in the first leg of the final on April 20 in Monterrey. The game concluded in a 2–2 draw. The second leg was played at Rio Tinto on April 27, 2011. Monterrey won 1–0 (3–2 on aggregate) with a late goal in the first half.

Colorado Rapids and Los Angeles Galaxy have qualified directly into Group Stage for the 2011–12 edition of the Champions League by being the MLS Cup and Supporters' Shield winners, respectively. Both Seattle Sounders FC and FC Dallas have earned preliminary entries in the tournament by winning the U.S. Open Cup and finishing runner up in the MLS Cup, respectively. Toronto FC secured the Canadian berth in the preliminary round with their Voyageurs Cup victory on July 2.

==== World Football Challenge ====
On March 29, 2011, MLS Commissioner Don Garber confirmed that the 2011 edition of the North American SuperLiga would be replaced by the World Football Challenge, a friendly tournament which started play on July 14 and will end on August 6.

The following MLS sides entered the tournament based on invitation: Los Angeles Galaxy, Philadelphia Union, New England Revolution, Chicago Fire and Vancouver Whitecaps FC.

=== Domestic competitions ===
==== Lamar Hunt U.S. Open Cup ====
The MLS clubs that finished first through sixth place overall during last year's regular season earned a direct bye to the third round proper of the U.S. Open Cup. Clubs that finished seventh or lower will have to play for the final two spots in a series of play-in propers, based on their geographic location as well as their final regular season position.

==== Canadian championship ====
The two Canadian-based MLS clubs, Toronto FC and Vancouver Whitecaps FC participated in the Canadian Championship, Canada's domestic soccer cup. They competed against two other professional Canadian soccer teams from the NASL for the Voyageurs Cup, as well as a Preliminary Round berth in the CONCACAF Champions League. The tournament is organized in a knockout format with two-legged ties in both the semifinals and final, with the away goals rule in place.

The two began in the semifinal round, where the Whitecaps defeated the Montreal Impact and Toronto defeated FC Edmonton. The first leg of the final, held in Vancouver on May 18, ended in a 1–1 draw. The second leg, on May 25 in Toronto, was abandoned due to torrential rains with the Whitecaps leading 1–0. Under competition rules, the second leg was to be replayed in its entirety the following day, but the field remained unplayable. The second leg was replayed, again in its entirety, on July 2, with Toronto winning the game 2–1 and the championship 3–2 on aggregate.

=== League competitions ===
==== MLS Cup ====
Following the 2011 season, ten MLS clubs will qualify for the MLS Cup Playoffs postseason tournament. Of the ten clubs, six will be automatic qualifiers from the top three clubs in each conference. These automatic qualifiers earn a bye to the conference semifinal, or quarterfinal round proper. Four more qualifiers will enter in a play-in round, where these for clubs will be determined by their final regular season standing, regardless of their conference. The winners of the play-in games will play in the conference semifinals, where the lowest seeded club will play against the Supporters' Shield winners.

The cup final will be held on a neutral venue.

==== Cups and Rivalries ====
This season marks the first time that the Cascadia Cup will be contested in Major League Soccer. Seattle, Portland and Vancouver contested this cup from 2004–08 until Seattle joined Major League Soccer. The competition continued between Portland and Vancouver for the next two years.
