= 2010 Los Angeles Galaxy season =

American soccer club season

Los Angeles Galaxy
2010 season
- Owner: Philip Anschutz (AEG)
- Coach: Bruce Arena
- Major League Soccer: 1st
- MLS Cup: Conference finals
- CONCACAF Champions League: Preliminary round
- U.S. Open Cup: Quarterfinals
- Top goalscorer: League: Edson Buddle (17); All: Edson Buddle (18)
- Highest home attendance: 89,134 vs Real Madrid (August 7, 2010)
- Lowest home attendance: 2,179 vs St. Louis (June 29, 2010)
- Average home league attendance: 21,437
Home colors	Away colors

The 2010 Los Angeles Galaxy season was the club's fifteenth season of existence. It was also the Galaxy's fifteenth season in Major League Soccer and their fifteenth-consecutive year at the top-flight of American soccer.

The club's season was highlighted by winning their third-ever Supporters' Shield. Statistically, the 2010 MLS season was the Galaxy's strongest season on record, and the club had their strongest start ever, opening their first eleven games unbeaten before losing to the eventual second-place finishers, Real Salt Lake at Rio Tinto. Some of the club's notable achievements included Edson Buddle being a runner-up for the MLS Golden Boot award, with 17 goals tallied during the regular season. Galaxy captain and United States national team star Landon Donovan led the club in assists with 12. The club finished the MLS regular season with a 17–7–8 record, their best in nearly a decade.

The club also competed in the preliminary rounds of the CONCACAF Champions League, and the early rounds of the U.S. Open Cup.

In Champions League play, the Galaxy, considered at one point to be favorites to win the entire tournament suffered a shocking blow, when the club suffered a 4–1 home defeat to confederation minnows, Puerto Rico Islanders, who were 11th place at the time in USSF D2 Pro League, the then-second tier of U.S. soccer. Although the Galaxy would defeat the Islanders 2–1 in Puerto Rico, it was not enough on aggregate to see the club advance into Group play. In the tournament, the Galaxy were the only club to defeat the Islanders in Puerto Rico. However, the Galaxy returned to Champions League play the next year by winning the Supporters' Shield title.

The Galaxy made it to the quarterfinals of the U.S. Open Cup with a convincing 2–0 win over second-tier AC St. Louis, before losing to Seattle Sounders FC by the same score line.

== Review ==
=== March ===
Los Angeles began their fifteenth Major League Soccer regular season at home with a 1–0 win against the New England Revolution on March 27, 2010. Edson Buddle scored the only goal for the Galaxy in the sixth minute.

=== April ===
David Beckham, with a torn left Achilles tendon injury, was ruled out for the season on April 26. He suffered the injury in a Serie A match for AC Milan against ChievoVerona on March 13, and as a result, will also miss the entire MLS season.

After scoring a league-leading 7 goals, Edson Buddle was named MLS Player of the Month for April

=== September ===
After a quick and incredible recovery, David Beckham returns to the LA Galaxy. He is brought in as a late sub for Juniho during the 70th minute of the September 11 L.A Galaxy vs Columbus Crew match, amidst the roaring cheers and applauds of Galaxy fans. The Galaxy go on to win the match 3–1.

== Club ==
=== First team roster ===

The first squad against Chivas USA on Oct. 3, 2010.

As of August 10, 2010.

Note: Flags indicate national team as defined under FIFA eligibility rules; some limited exceptions apply. Players may hold more than one non-FIFA nationality.

No.	Pos.	Nation	Player
1	GK	JAM	Donovan Ricketts
2	DF	USA	Todd Dunivant
4	DF	USA	Omar Gonzalez
5	DF	TRI	Yohance Marshall
6	MF	USA	Eddie Lewis
7	MF	USA	Chris Klein
8	MF	UKR	Dema Kovalenko
9	MF	USA	Jovan Kirovski
10	FW	USA	Landon Donovan (captain)
11	MF	TRI	Chris Birchall
12	GK	PUR	Josh Saunders
14	FW	USA	Edson Buddle

No.	Pos.	Nation	Player
16	DF	USA	Gregg Berhalter
17	FW	USA	Tristan Bowen
18	MF	USA	Mike Magee
19	MF	BRA	Juninho
20	DF	USA	A. J. DeLaGarza
22	DF	BRA	Leonardo
23	MF	ENG	David Beckham
24	GK	USA	Brian Perk
26	MF	USA	Michael Stephens
27	FW	USA	Bryan Jordan
28	DF	USA	Sean Franklin
88	DF	BRA	Alex Cazumba

=== Technical staff ===
Position	Staff
Head coach/general manager	(United States) Bruce Arena
Associate head coach	(United States) Dave Sarachan
Assistant coach/Director of player development	(England) Trevor James
Assistant coach	(United States) Cobi Jones
Goalkeeping coach	(United States) Ian Feuer
Director of Soccer Operations	(United States) David Kammarman
Athletic Trainer	(United States) Armando Rivas
Assistant Athletic Trainer	(United States) Cecelia Gutierrez
Equipment Manager	(Mexico) Raul Vargas
Equipment Coordinator	(Guatemala) Rafael Verdin
Team Administrator	(United States) Shant Kasparian
Strength & Conditioning Coach	(United States) Ben Yauss
Active Release Specialist	(Japan) Shunta Shimizu

Updated to match played October 20, 2010
Source: LA Galaxy

=== Management ===
Owner/Chairman	(United States) AEG
President of business operations	(United States) Tom Payne
Ground (capacity and dimensions)	Home Depot Center (27,000 / 109x68 meters)

Updated to match played October 26, 2010
Source: Los Angeles Galaxy

== Transfers ==
=== In ===
Date	Player	Previous club	Fee	Ref
December 23, 2009	(Brazil) Leonardo	(Brazil) São Paulo	Loan	
December 23, 2009	(Brazil) Juninho	(Brazil) São Paulo	Loan	
December 23, 2009	(Brazil) Alex Cazumba	(Brazil) São Paulo	Loan	
January 14, 2010	(United States) Michael Stephens	(United States) Chicago Fire Premier	Drafted	

=== Out ===
Date	Player	Destination Club	Fee	Ref
November 27, 2009	(Brazil) Stefani Miglioranzi	(United States) Philadelphia Union	Expansion Draft	
August 5, 2010	(United States) Alan Gordon	(United States) Chivas USA	Trade	

=== Loan ===
Player	Loaned to	Start	End	Ref
(England) David Beckham	(Italy) Milan	December 28, 2009	May 16, 2010	
(United States) Landon Donovan	(England) Everton	January 1, 2010	March 15, 2010	

== Statistics ==
Games played	37 (30 MLS, 3 MLS Playoffs, 2 CONCACAF Champions League, 2 U.S. Open Cup)
Games won	22 (18 MLS, 2 MLS Playoffs, 1 CONCACAF Champions League, 1 U.S. Open Cup)
Games drawn	5 (5 MLS)
Games lost	10 (7 MLS, 1 CONCACAF Champions League, 1 MLS Playoffs, 1 U.S. Open Cup)
Goals scored	52
Goals conceded	38
Goal difference	+16
Clean sheets	13
Yellow cards	50
Red cards	1
Worst discipline	(United States) Omar Gonzalez 8 (yellow card) 0 (red card)
Best result(s)	W 4–0 (A) v Seattle – Major League Soccer – July 2, 2010
Worst result(s)	L 4–1 (H) v Puerto Rico – CONCACAF Champions League – July 17, 2010
Most appearances	(Jamaica) Donovan Ricketts (32)
Top scorer	(United States) Edson Buddle (19)
Points	Overall: 59/90 (65.55%)

Last updated: November 18, 2010
Source: Competitions' Wikipedia articles.

== Match results ==
Win Tie Loss

== Major League Soccer ==
=== League table ===
Conference

Pos	Team	Pld	W	L	T	GF	GA	GD	Pts	Qualification
1	LA Galaxy	30	18	7	5	44	26	+18	59	MLS Cup Playoffs
2	Real Salt Lake	30	15	4	11	45	20	+25	56	MLS Cup Playoffs
3	FC Dallas	30	12	4	14	42	28	+14	50	MLS Cup Playoffs
4	Seattle Sounders FC	30	14	10	6	39	35	+4	48	MLS Cup Playoffs
5	Colorado Rapids	30	12	8	10	44	32	+12	46	MLS Cup Playoffs
6	San Jose Earthquakes	30	13	10	7	34	33	+1	46	MLS Cup Playoffs
7	Houston Dynamo	30	9	15	6	40	49	−9	33	
8	Chivas USA	30	8	18	4	31	45	−14	28	

Source: MLS

Overall

Pos	Team	Pld	W	L	T	GF	GA	GD	Pts	Qualification
1	LA Galaxy (S)	30	18	7	5	44	26	+18	59	CONCACAF Champions League
2	Real Salt Lake	30	15	4	11	45	20	+25	56	
3	New York Red Bulls	30	15	9	6	38	29	+9	51	
4	FC Dallas	30	12	4	14	42	28	+14	50	CONCACAF Champions League
5	Columbus Crew	30	14	8	8	40	34	+6	50	
6	Seattle Sounders FC	30	14	10	6	39	35	+4	48	CONCACAF Champions League
7	Colorado Rapids (C)	30	12	8	10	44	32	+12	46	CONCACAF Champions League
8	San Jose Earthquakes	30	13	10	7	34	33	+1	46	
9	Kansas City Wizards	30	11	13	6	36	35	+1	39	
10	Chicago Fire	30	9	12	9	37	38	−1	36	
11	Toronto FC	30	9	13	8	33	41	−8	35	CONCACAF Champions League
12	Houston Dynamo	30	9	15	6	40	49	−9	33	
13	New England Revolution	30	9	16	5	32	50	−18	32	
14	Philadelphia Union	30	8	15	7	35	49	−14	31	
15	Chivas USA	30	8	18	4	31	45	−14	28	
16	D.C. United	30	6	20	4	21	47	−26	22	

Source: MLS
Rules for classification: 1) points; 2) head-to-head record; 3) goal difference; 4) number of goals scored
(C) Champions; (S) Supporters' Shield

=== Results summary ===
Overall								Home						Away					
Pld	Pts	W	L	T	GF	GA	GD	W	L	T	GF	GA	GD	W	L	T	GF	GA	GD
30	59	18	7	5	44	26	+18	9	4	2	27	19	+8	9	3	3	17	7	+10

Last updated: October 25, 2010
Source: MLSNet.com
Pld = Matches played; Pts = Points; W = Matches won; T = Matches tied; L = Matches lost; GF = Goals for; GA = Goals against; GD = Goal difference

Round	1	2	3	4	5	6	7	8	9	10	11	12	13	14	15	16	17	18	19	20	21	22	23	24	25	26	27	28	29	30
Stadium	H	H	A	H	A	H	A	A	H	A	A	H	A	A	H	A	A	H	H	A	A	H	A	H	H	H	A	A	H	H
Result	W	W	W	W	T	W	W	W	T	W	W	W	L	T	W	L	W	T	L	W	L	L	T	W	W	L	W	W	L	W
Position	5	2	1	1	1	1	1	1	1	1	1	1	1	1	1	1	1	1	1	1	1	1	1	1	1	1	1	1	1	1

Updated to match(es) played on October 25, 2010. Source: MLS Results and League table
A = Away; H = Home; W = Win; L = Loss; T = Tie

== Matches ==
=== Regular season ===
March 27, 2010	Los Angeles Galaxy	1–0	New England Revolution	Carson, California
11:00 pm EDT	Buddle 6'	Report	Alston (yellow card) 18'; Niouky (yellow card) 41'	Stadium: The Home Depot Center; Attendance: 21,500; Referee: Terry Vaughn

April 1, 2010	Los Angeles Galaxy	2–0	Chivas USA	Carson, California USA
11:00 pm EDT	Buddle 7', 86'; Birchall (yellow card) 25'; Stephens (yellow card) 90'	Report	Umaña (yellow card) 18'	Stadium: The Home Depot Center; Attendance: 19,805; Referee: Ricardo Salazar

April 10, 2010	Houston Dynamo	0–2	Los Angeles Galaxy	Houston, Texas
8:30 pm EDT	Landín (red card) 43'	Report	Buddle 26', 44'	Stadium: Robertson Stadium; Attendance: 16,459; Referee: Baldomero Toledo

April 17, 2010	Los Angeles Galaxy	2–1	Real Salt Lake	Carson, California
11:00 pm EDT	Buddle 11', 76'	Report	Beckerman 40'	Stadium: The Home Depot Center; Attendance: 20,444; Referee: Mark Geiger

April 24, 2010	Kansas City Wizards	0–0	Los Angeles Galaxy	Kansas City, Kansas
8:30 pm EDT	Arnaud (yellow card) 73'	Report	Juninho (yellow card) 35'; Birchall (yellow card) 57'; Buddle (yellow card) 90+4'	Stadium: Community America Ballpark; Attendance: 10,045; Referee: Alex Prus

May 1, 2010	Los Angeles Galaxy	3–1	Philadelphia Union	Carson, California
10:30 pm EDT	DeLaGarza 1'; Buddle 27', 44'; Gonzalez (yellow card) 77'	Report	Miglioranzi (red card) 45'; Nakazawa (yellow card) 72'; McInerney 84'	Stadium: The Home Depot Center; Attendance: 15,453; Referee: Silvia Reyes

May 5, 2010	Colorado Rapids	0–1	Los Angeles Galaxy	Commerce City, Colorado USA
9:30 pm EDT	Ballaouchy (yellow card) 29'; Cummings (yellow card) 63'; Casey (yellow card) 77'	Report	Gordon 21'; Juninho (yellow card) 30'; Buddle (yellow card) 89'	Stadium: Dick's Sporting Goods Park; Attendance: 9,882; Referee: Edvin Jurisevic

May 8, 2010	Seattle Sounders FC	0–4	Los Angeles Galaxy	Seattle, Washington USA
4:00 pm EDT	Hurtado (yellow card) 38'; Marshall (yellow card) 63'	Report	Kirovski 22'; Gonzalez 52'; Dunivant 57'; Donovan 68'	Stadium: Qwest Field; Attendance: 36,273; Referee: Kevin Stott

May 15, 2010	Los Angeles Galaxy	0–0	Toronto FC	Carson, California
10:30 pm EDT	Gonzalez (yellow card) 50'	(Report)	Usanov (yellow card) 61' (yellow-red card) 90+4'	Stadium: The Home Depot Center; Attendance: 20,007; Referee: Jair Marrufo

May 20, 2010	FC Dallas	0–1	Los Angeles Galaxy	Frisco, Texas
8:30 pm EDT	Ihemelu (yellow card) 28'; Shea (yellow card) 41'	Report	Magee 17'; Magee (yellow card) 31'; Stephens (yellow card) 34'	Stadium: Pizza Hut Park; Attendance: 10,947; Referee: Abbey Okulaja

May 29, 2010	Columbus Crew	0–2	Los Angeles Galaxy	Columbus, Ohio
7:30 pm EDT	Zayner (yellow card) 35'	Report	Stephens 10'; Gonzalez (yellow card) 25'; DeLaGarza (yellow card) 29'; Birchall (yellow card) 79'; Bowen 88'; Dunivant (yellow card) 90'	Stadium: Columbus Crew Stadium; Attendance: 18,139; Referee: Michael Kennedy

June 5, 2010	Los Angeles Galaxy	4–1	Houston Dynamo	Carson, California
8:00 pm EDT	Kirovski 1', 21'; Bowen 49'; Cazumba 55'	Report	Weaver 6'	Stadium: The Home Depot Center; Attendance: 20,826; Referee: Paul Ward

June 9, 2010	Real Salt Lake	1–0	Los Angeles Galaxy	Sandy, Utah
9:00 pm EDT	Williams (yellow card) 62'; Morales 79'; Morales (yellow card) 80'	Report	Juninho (yellow card) 19'; Gonzalez (yellow card) 84'	Stadium: Rio Tinto Stadium; Attendance: 19,513; Referee: Edvin Jurisevic

June 26, 2010	Toronto FC	0–0	Los Angeles Galaxy	Toronto, Ontario, CAN
7:30 pm EDT		Report		Stadium: BMO Field; Attendance: 18,809; Referee: Alex Prus

July 4, 2010	Los Angeles Galaxy	3–1	Seattle Sounders FC	Carson, California
10:30 pm EDT	Buddle 19'; Juninho 47'; Riley 77' (o.g.); Cazumba (yellow card) 88'	Report	Zakuani 66'; Marshall (yellow card) 81'	Stadium: The Home Depot Center; Attendance: 27,000; Referee: Silviu Petrescu

July 10, 2010	New England Revolution	2–0	Los Angeles Galaxy	Foxborough, Massachusetts
7:30 pm ET	Perovic 67'; Nyassi 73' (yellow card) 88'	Report	Bowen (yellow card) 43'; Juninho (yellow card) 64'	Stadium: Gillette Stadium; Attendance: 20,155; Referee: Paul Ward

July 18, 2010	D.C. United	1–2	Los Angeles Galaxy	Washington, D.C.
	Najar 54'		Buddle 38'; Donovan 58' (pen.)	Stadium: RFK Stadium; Attendance: 17,688; Referee: Jasen Anno

July 22, 2010	Los Angeles Galaxy	2–2	San Jose Earthquakes	Carson, California
	Buddle 59'; Donovan (yellow card) 70' (goal) 90'; Franklin (yellow card) 89'; Juninho (yellow card) 90+3'	Report	Convey 2'; Burling (yellow card) 53'; McDonald 72'	Stadium: The Home Depot Center; Attendance: 17,712; Referee: Jair Marrufo

August 1, 2010	Los Angeles Galaxy	2–3	Chicago Fire	Carson, California
	Donovan 37' (pen.), 81' (pen.)	Report	Pappa 4'; John 5'; Banner 19'	Stadium: The Home Depot Center; Attendance: 20,348; Referee: Silviu Petrescu

August 14, 2010	New York Red Bulls	0–1	Los Angeles Galaxy	Harrison, New Jersey
		Report	Buddle 10'	Stadium: Red Bull Arena; Attendance: 25,000; Referee: Mark Geiger

August 21, 2010	San Jose Earthquakes	1–0	Los Angeles Galaxy	Santa Clara, California
	Wondolowski 4'	Report		Stadium: Buck Shaw Stadium; Attendance: 10,799; Referee: Terry Vaughn

August 28, 2010	Los Angeles Galaxy	0–2	Kansas City Wizards	Carson, California
	Birchall (yellow card) 68'	Report	Arnaud 12'; Conrad 70'; Nielsen (yellow card) 91'	Stadium: The Home Depot Center; Attendance: 20,112; Referee: Yeder Reyes

September 4, 2010	Chicago Fire	1–1	Los Angeles Galaxy	Bridgeview, Illinois
	Segares (red card) 22'; Pause (yellow card) 63'; John (yellow card) 88' (goal) 88'	Report	Gonzalez (yellow card) 87' (goal) 89'	Stadium: Toyota Park; Attendance: 21,068; Referee: Mark Geiger

September 11, 2010	Los Angeles Galaxy	3–1	Columbus Crew	Carson, California
7:30 pm PDT	Buddle 14'; Kovalenko 35'; Kirovski 55'; Magee (yellow card) 72'; Beckham (yellow card) 74'	Report	Mendoza 85'	Stadium: The Home Depot Center; Attendance: 19,482; Referee: Alex Prus

September 18, 2010	Los Angeles Galaxy	2–1	D.C. United	Carson, California
7:30 pm PDT	Gonzalez (yellow card) 39'; Marshall (yellow card) 62'; Donovan 81', 86' (yellow card) 87'	Report	Najar 60'	Stadium: The Home Depot Center; Attendance: 20,094; Referee: Baldomero Toledo

September 24, 2010	Los Angeles Galaxy	0–2	New York Red Bulls	Carson, California
8:00 pm PDT	DeLaGarza (yellow card) 56'; Marshall (yellow card) 59'; Beckham (yellow card) 86'	Report	Richards 35'; Ángel 59' (pen.)	Stadium: The Home Depot Center; Attendance: 27,000; Referee: Baldomero Toledo

October 3, 2010	Chivas USA	1–2	Los Angeles Galaxy	Carson, California
4:00 pm PDT	Borja (yellow card) 38'; Gordon 63'; Espinoza (yellow card) 79'	in progress	Buddle 23'; Beckham 39'; Eddie Lewis (red card) 76'; Stephens (yellow card) 89'	Stadium: The Home Depot Center; Attendance: 24,283; Referee: Jair Marrufo

October 7, 2010	Philadelphia Union	0–1	Los Angeles Galaxy	Chester, Pennsylvania
			Buddle 27'	Stadium: PPL Park; Attendance: 18,779

October 16, 2010	Los Angeles Galaxy	1–3	Colorado Rapids	Carson, California
	Buddle 9'		Juninho 18' (o.g.); Thompson (yellow card) 24'; Casey 30' (yellow card) 34'; Cummings 67'	Stadium: The Home Depot Center; Attendance: 27,000; Referee: Kevin Scott

October 24, 2010	Los Angeles Galaxy	2–1	FC Dallas	Carson, California
	Beckham 33'; Juninho 46'		Harris 22'	Stadium: The Home Depot Center; Attendance: 24,993; Referee: Mark Geiger

=== Playoffs ===
October 30, 2010 Conf. Semifinals	Seattle Sounders FC	0–1	Los Angeles Galaxy	Seattle, Washington
5:00 pm PDT	Montero (yellow card) 49'; Nkufo (yellow card) 93+'	Report	Buddle 38'; Juninho (yellow card) 48'; Kovalenko (yellow card) 65'; Kirovski (yellow card) 82'	Stadium: Qwest Field; Attendance: 35,521; Referee: (California) Ricardo Salazar

November 7, 2010 Conf. Semifinals	Los Angeles Galaxy	2–1 (3–1 agg.)	Seattle Sounders FC	Carson, California
6:00 pm PDT	Beckham (yellow card) 8'; Buddle 19'; Gonzalez 27'	Report	Ianni (yellow card) 65'; Zakuani 86'	Stadium: Home Depot Center; Attendance: 27,000; Referee: (New Mexico) Baldomero Toledo

November 14, 2010 Conf. Finals	Los Angeles Galaxy	0–3	FC Dallas	Carson, California
6:00 pm PDT	Kovalenko (yellow card) 37'; Beckham (yellow card) 73'; Birchall (yellow card) 82'; Cazumba (yellow card) 84'	Report	Ferreira 26'; John 54'; Chavez 73'; Loyd (yellow card) 85'	Stadium: Home Depot Center; Attendance: 27,000; Referee: Jair Maruffo

=== U.S. Open Cup ===
Finishing in second place overall in 2009, the Galaxy were one of the six MLS clubs guaranteed a Third round spot in the 2010 edition of the U.S. Open Cup. The Galaxy were paired against the USSF Pro League's AC St. Louis. Hosting the Saints at Home Depot Center on June 29, a pair of goals from Chris Klein and Juninho gave the Galaxy a 2–0 victory over visiting St. Louis.

On July 7, 2010; the Galaxy traveled up northwest to take on the defending Open Cup champions, Seattle Sounders FC in Tukwila, Washington. In front of a sold-out crowd of 4,500 at Starfire Complex, the Galaxy would lose 2–0, the loss to the eventual champions ended their brief Open Cup campaign.

June 29, 2010 Third round	Los Angeles Galaxy (California)	2–0	(Missouri) AC St. Louis	The Home Depot Center; Carson, CA
7:30 pm PDT	Kirovski (yellow card) 55'; Klein 69'; Juninho 80'	Report	Salvaggione (yellow card) 72'	Attendance: 2,179; Referee: (USA)

July 7, 2010 Quarterfinals	Seattle Sounders FC (Washington (state))	2–0	(California) Los Angeles Galaxy	Starfire Sports Complex, Tukwila, WA
7:00 pm PDT	Jaqua 50', 62'; Estrada (yellow card) 89'	Report	Cazumba (yellow card) 45'; Jordan (yellow card) 70'; Gordon (yellow card) 89'	Attendance: 4,512; Referee: (Texas) Jair Marrufo

=== 2010–11 CONCACAF Champions League ===
July 27, 2010 Preliminary round	Los Angeles Galaxy (United States)	1–4	Puerto Rico Islanders	The Home Depot Center, Carson
7:00 pm PDT	Martinez 83' (o.g.)	Report	Foley 26'; Addlery 45', 81'; Hansen 56'	Attendance: 6,783; Referee: (Jamaica) Raymond Bogle

August 4, 2010 Preliminary round	Puerto Rico Islanders	1–2 (5–3 agg.)	(United States) Los Angeles Galaxy	Estadio Juan Ramón Loubriel, Bayamón
4:00 pm PDT	Foley 33' (pen.)	Report	Vélez 37' (o.g.); Franklin 84'	Attendance: 12,993; Referee: (Barbados) Trevor Taylor

Puerto Rico Islanders won 5–3 on aggregate.

=== International friendlies ===
May 23, 2010	Los Angeles Galaxy (United States)	1–0	(Argentina) Boca Juniors	Carson, California
	Bowen 82'			Stadium: Home Depot Center; Attendance: 18,268

August 7, 2010	Los Angeles Galaxy (United States)	2–3	(Spain) Real Madrid	Pasadena, California
	Dunivant 40'; Donovan 45'		Higuaín 52', 62'; Pedro León 71'	Stadium: The Rose Bowl; Attendance: 89,134
