= A. J. DeLaGarza =

Soccer player (born 1987)

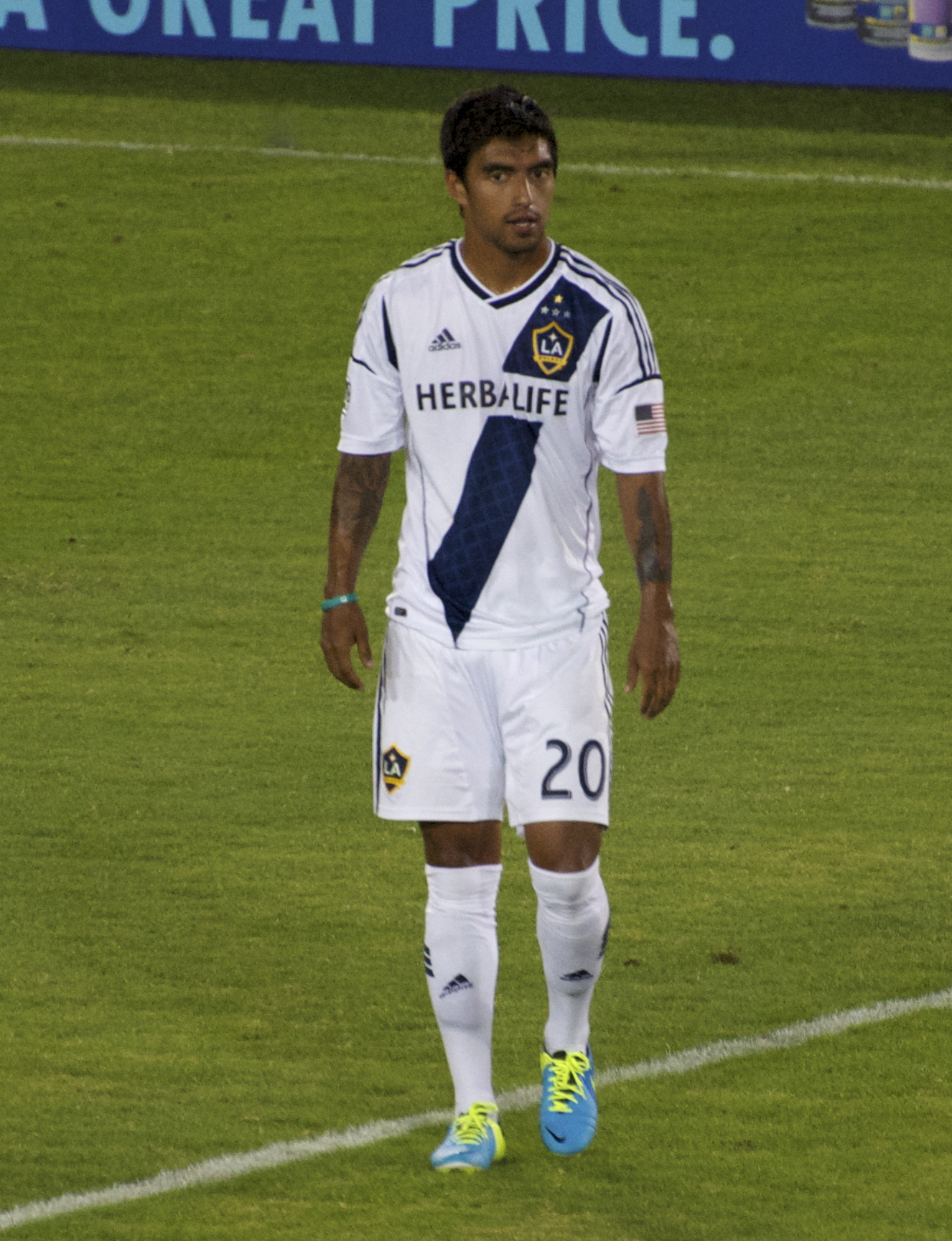
- DeLaGarza with LA Galaxy in 2013

Personal information
- Full name: Adolph Joseph DeLaGarza
- Date of birth: November 4, 1987 (age 39)
- Place of birth: Bryans Road, Maryland, United States
- Height: 1.75 m (5 ft 9 in)
- Position: Defender

Team information
- Current team: Des Moines Menace

Youth career
- Henry E. Lackey High School

College career
Years	Team	Apps	(Gls)
2005–2008	Maryland Terrapins	88	(0)

Senior career*
Years	Team	Apps	(Gls)
2009–2016	LA Galaxy	204	(2)
2015	LA Galaxy II	1	(0)
2017–2019	Houston Dynamo	57	(0)
2018	→ Rio Grande Valley (loan)	4	(0)
2020	Inter Miami CF	5	(0)
2021–2022	New England Revolution	14	(0)
2024–	Des Moines Menace	0	(0)
Total		285	(2)

International career^{‡}
2012	United States	2	(0)
2013–2019	Guam	14	(0)
- * Club domestic league appearances and goals as of October 13, 2022 ‡ National team caps and goals as of April 19, 2020

Adolph Joseph DeLaGarza (born November 4, 1987) is a former professional soccer player. He was a constant fixture in the LA Galaxy teams of the early 2010s that won three MLS Cups and two Supporters' Shields. He currently plays for USL League Two club Des Moines Menace.

A United States international in 2012, DeLaGarza switched allegiances and represented his ancestral Guam from 2013 until 2019.

== Early life ==
DeLaGarza was born in Bryans Road, Maryland to a Mexican-Chamorro father and a Native American mother.

== Club career ==
=== Youth career ===
At the age of 12, DeLaGarza played for the D.C. United U-12 at the Danone Cup in France, under coach Dave Sarachan. He also played for Baltimore Casa Mia's Bays, where he won two USYSA National Championships. In high school, DeLaGarza played at Henry E. Lackey High School for head coach Gary Lesko in Indian Head, Maryland. DeLaGarza enjoyed a distinguished high school career, being named all-state twice, all-county four times and all-conference four times.

DeLaGarza played college soccer at the University of Maryland, College Park. He was named College Soccer News Second Team All-Freshman after helping Maryland win the National Championship in 2005. He started the title game and helped the Terps keep a clean sheet in a 1–0 victory over New Mexico. DeLaGarza had a successful senior season being named to the College Cup All-Tournament Team, Second Team All-ACC selection, and was his team's Co-Most Valuable Defensive Player as he helped lead Maryland to the 2008 National Championship and 2008 ACC Championship.

=== Los Angeles Galaxy ===
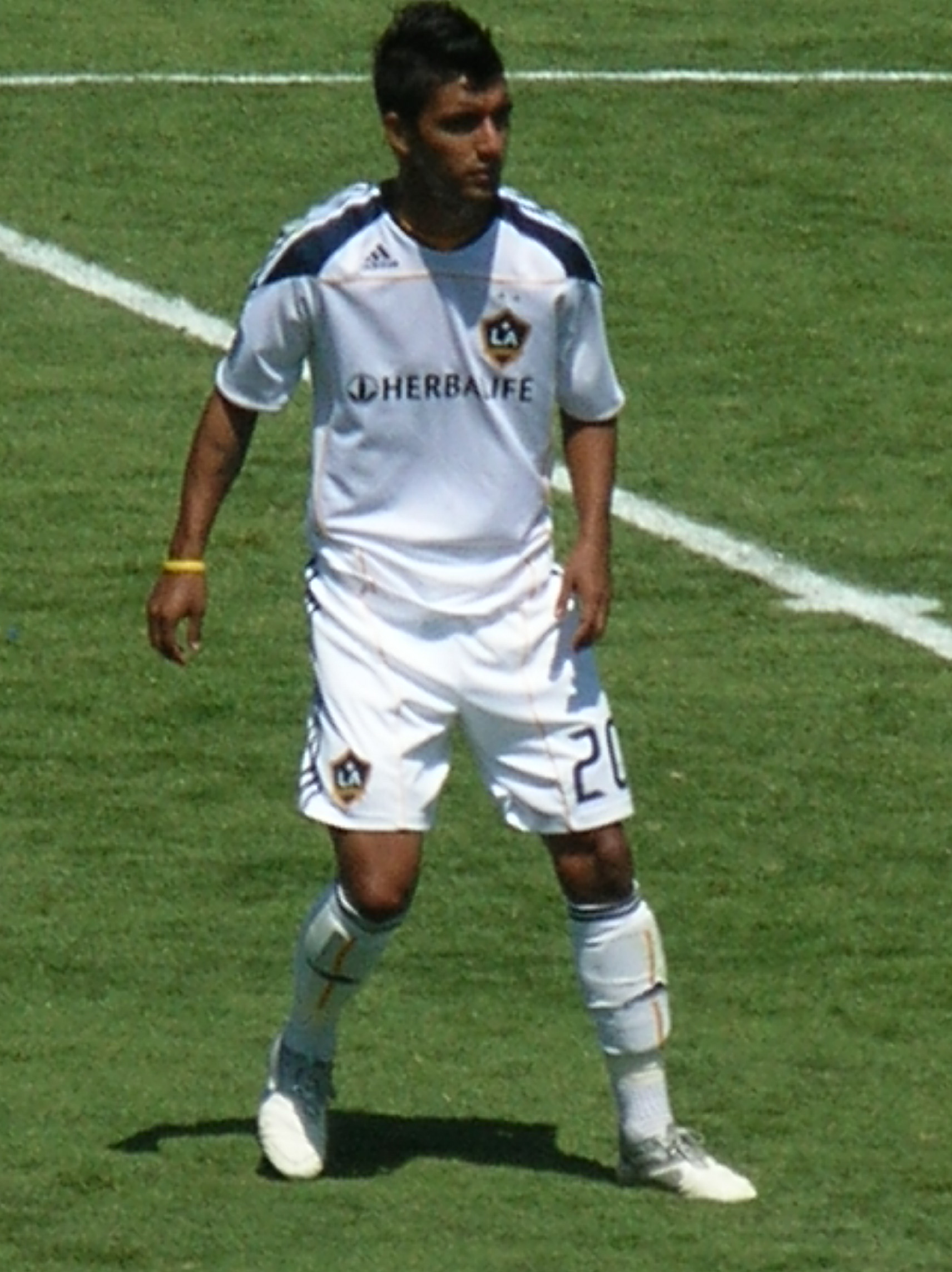
DeLaGarza with the Galaxy in August 2010

DeLaGarza was drafted in the second round (19th overall) of the 2009 MLS SuperDraft by LA Galaxy. He made his professional debut on March 22, 2009, in Galaxy's first game of the 2009 MLS season against D.C. United, playing the whole 90 minutes at left back in a 2–2 draw. Following Sean Franklin's mid-season hamstring injury, DeLaGarza played many games at the right side of Galaxy's defense, starting 16 consecutive games at right back before missing a game due to injury. He would ultimately clock 1,754 minutes in his rookie season. DeLaGarza picked up his first career assist on July 11, sending in a cross that Edson Buddle headed past the Chivas USA keeper to give the Galaxy a 1–0 win. DeLaGarza scored his first goal for LA in a 6–3 loss against FC Dallas on September 12, 2009. He helped the Galaxy defense concede 31 fewer goals than in 2008 and set a club record for clean sheets in a season with 12. The strengthened defense helped LA finish first in the Western Conference. DeLaGarza would make two appearances in the playoffs as the Galaxy would go onto reach MLS Cup, where they lost to Real Salt Lake.

On May 1, 2010, DeLaGarza scored the then fourth fastest goal in club history when he rushed to the back post to tap in a pass from Buddle after 51 seconds. LA would go on to defeat the Philadelphia Union 3–1. He made his debut in the CONCACAF Champions League on July 27, a 4–1 loss to the Puerto Rico Islanders. He and the Galaxy had a strong season in 2010 as they lifted the Supporters' Shield. DeLaGarza's versatility was on display throughout the year, as he featured as a left back, center back, and as a right back. In eight of his 17 league appearances on the year, LA kept a clean sheet. He played every minute of their playoff run at center back, filling in for the injured Gregg Berhalter. However, they would fail to return to MLS Cup after losing to Dallas in the Western Conference Finals.

He's been a rock now for years, and he makes plays. He's always in the right spot; he's always dependable. You know if something goes wrong then he's going to be in the right spot.

— Landon Donovan on the importance of DeLaGarza, October 2012.

In 2011, DeLaGarza featured mainly as a center back. He established himself as a key player for the Galaxy, playing in 30 of the 34 regular season matches and his 2,627 regular season were the second most on the team to Todd Dunivant. He also played every minute in both US Open Cup fixtures, every minute in all six CCL games, and played every minute of the Galaxy's playoff run. DeLaGarza also only picked up two yellow cards all season. The Galaxy would once again win the Supporters' Shield, but had more success in the playoffs this year, defeating the Houston Dynamo 1–0 in the MLS Cup final, becoming the sixth club to win both in the same season.

2012 saw DeLaGarza start all 30 of his league games at center back. Once Omar Gonzalez returned from injury in July, he and DeLaGarza formed one of the better center back pairs in MLS. On October 1, 2012, in a match against the Colorado Rapids, DeLaGarza went down with a serious injury in the 31st minute. The Galaxy managed to hold off Colorado in a 1–1 draw, but DeLaGarza would be out for the rest of the regular season as well as the playoffs. Despite missing DeLaGarza, the Galaxy managed to return to MLS Cup once again and defeated the Dynamo for the second straight year, this time by a score of 3–1. DeLaGarza was rewarded for his strong performances throughout the year as he was named the Galaxy Defensive Player of the Year for 2012.

DeLaGarza remained a key piece of LA's defense in 2013. He scored his first goal since 2010 and his first in the Champions League on April 3 in a 1–2 loss to CF Monterrey in the first leg of the semi-final tie. The Galaxy would go onto to lose 3–1 on aggregate. DeLaGarza started the season shifting between right back and center back before settling in at center back in April, where he would remain until August, when he once again moved to right back. On September 14, he suffered a dislocated elbow in a 2–2 draw with D.C. United that forced him to miss the rest of the regular season. DeLaGarza returned to action on October 24 in a 4–0 loss to Isidro Metapán in a CONCACAF Champions League group stage match. He also came off the bench in both of the Galaxy's quarter final games with Real Salt Lake in the playoffs; however, LA lost 2–1 extra time.

2014 was one of the most successful seasons of DeLaGarza's career. He played primarily as a center back, but also played as a left back and right back throughout the year. DeLaGarza anchored the backline that allowed a MLS low 35 goals in 34 games. He was named as the Galaxy Defensive player of the year for the second time in his career. Although he only had two assists in the regular season, he matched that total in his four playoff appearances. The first of his playoff assists came on November 9 in the second leg of the Western Conference semi-final match up with Real Salt Lake. DeLaGarza sent in a cross that Landon Donovan headed past Nick Rimando in the 10th minute to open up the scoring. The Galaxy would go onto win the match 5–0 and advance. The second came in the first leg of the Western Conference Final matchup against Seattle Sounders FC. DeLaGarza set up Marcelo Sarvas who sent the ball into the net. Los Angeles would win the first leg 1–0 and would advance on away goals after losing the second leg 2–1. The Galaxy would face the New England Revolution in the final win 2–1 in extra time with DeLaGarza playing for the whole 120 minutes. DeLaGarza missed three games in September after the death of his son Luca, who suffered from a rare heart defect.

The 2015 season was a disappointing season for the Galaxy and for DeLaGarza. He made 24 appearances in the league to help LA reach the playoffs for the seventh straight season. However, they would be eliminated in the knockout round after losing 3–2 to Seattle. DeLaGarza also missed time and played injured throughout the season while dealing with a groin injury that he suffered during pre-season.

2016 saw DeLaGarza once again lead one of the league's best defenses, making 24 MLS appearances for the defense that allowed the second fewest goals in the league. On September 4, DeLaGarza became just the fifth Galaxy players to make at least 200 MLS regular season appearances for the club, joining Landon Donovan, Cobi Jones, Kevin Hartman and Mauricio Cienfuegos. His versatility was crucial for head coach Bruce Arena, who could count on DeLaGarza to give a strong performance at right back and center back throughout the year. The Galaxy returned for the playoffs for the eighth straight year in 2016. However, they would fail to make a deep run, losing to the Rapids on penalties in the Conference semi-finals. DeLaGarza did not appear in any of the three playoff matches.

After eight seasons with LA Galaxy, DeLaGarza was traded to the Houston Dynamo on January 13, 2017, in exchange for $125,000 of general allocation money and $50,000 of targeted allocation money.

=== Houston Dynamo ===
Dynamo head coach Wílmer Cabrera made it clear that he intended to use DeLaGarza solely as a right back. DeLaGarza made his Dynamo debut in the season opener on March 4, a 2–1 win over Seattle. He got his first assist as a Dynamo on May 6 in a 4–0 win over Orlando City SC, sending the ball forward to Alberth Elis who was able to put the ball in the net for the second goal of the game. He started all but four games at right back for Houston, missing three in April with a quad injury and one due to yellow card accumulation. DeLaGarza helped the Dynamo reach the playoffs for the first time in three seasons. His three assists were also a single season career high. However, in the final game of the regular season, DeLaGarza suffered a torn ACL, which forced him to miss the playoffs and most of 2018.

On January 9, 2018, DeLaGarza signed a new contract to remain in Houston. The Dynamo had declined the option on his previous deal, opting to negotiate a lower salary as a result of his significant injury. DeLaGarza returned from injury on August 11 the Dynamo's USL affiliate, Rio Grande Valley FC in a 2–1 defeat to Sacramento Republic. He would make four appearances with the Toros before rejoining to the Dynamo. On September 26, DeLaGarza was on the Dynamo bench for the first time of the season for the 2018 US Open Cup Final, a 3–0 win over the Philadelphia Union, although DeLaGarza did not feature in the match. The result saw the Dynamo qualify for the CONCACAF Champions League the following season. He made his first appearance with the Dynamo of the year on September 29, a 3–2 win against the San Jose Earthquakes. He would start fou of the final five games of the season, including a 3–2 win over the Galaxy on the last day of the season to deny LA a spot in the playoffs, with DeLaGarza winning a penalty that Mauro Manotas converted to level the score at two. His return was unable to save the Dynamo's season as they would miss the playoffs in 2018, the first time DeLaGarza's team had failed to qualify in his career.

Now back to full health, DeLaGarza returned to his role as the primary right back for Houston in 2019. He would make his first appearance of 2019 in the Dynamo's opening match of their CONCACAF Champions League campaign, a 1–0 win at Guastatoya on February 19. DeLaGarza appeared in all four of the CCL matches as they reached the quarterfinals before falling to Tigres. After not appearing in the season opener due to being rested for the Champions League, DeLaGarza made 14 straight starts at right back in MLS matches, picking up one assist in that stretch. After appearing in his 23rd out of a possible 28 league games for the Dynamo, DeLaGarza's season came to an end on August 31 when he suffered a broken foot in a 1–0 loss to Sporting Kansas City. It was another disappointing season for Houston as a team, missing out on the playoffs for the second straight season.

DeLaGarza's contract expired at the end of the 2019 season, making him a free agent.

=== Inter Miami ===
On December 2, 2019, DeLaGarza joined MLS expansion side Inter Miami CF ahead of their inaugural 2020 season. He made his debut for Miami on October 3, 2020, in a 3–2 loss to New York City FC. In a shortened season due to the COVID-19 pandemic, DeLaGarza played in 5 of a possible 23 games during the regular season. In their first game of the playoffs, DeLaGarza got to start at centerback, however they would lose to fellow expansion side Nashville SC 3–0.

His contract expired after the 2020 season, making him a free agent.

=== New England Revolution ===
As a free agent, DeLaGarza signed with the New England Revolution on January 7, 2021. Following the 2022 season, DeLaGarza's contract with New England expired. On November 17, 2022, DeLaGarza signed a ceremonial one-day contract with LA Galaxy and retired from playing professional soccer.

=== Des Moines Menace ===
In April 2024, DeLaGarza joined the Des Moines Menace ahead of the 2024 U.S. Open Cup second round match.

== International career ==
=== United States ===
On December 21, 2010, United States men's national soccer team head coach Bob Bradley called in DeLaGarza along with 23 other players into the United States' January 2011 training camp. The end of the training camp culminated in a match against the Chile national football team. On January 22, 2011, DeLaGarza was selected to the 18 member game day roster. However, DeLaGarza failed to make an appearance in the 1–1 draw against Chile.

On January 21, 2012, DeLaGarza made his début for the senior side of the United States in a friendly match against the Venezuela national football team. DeLaGarza started the match and played all 90 minutes in the 1–0 win over the Venezuela. Four days later, DeLaGarza, again started and played the full 90 minutes in the United States' victory against Panama.

=== Guam ===
DeLaGarza was still eligible to play for the Guam national team because he was not officially cap-tied with the United States. On August 27, 2013, he made the commitment to switch and play for the Guam national team. On November 16, 2013, DeLaGarza made his first appearance for the Matao in a 1–1 draw in a friendly with Laos. He appeared in his first competitive match for Guam on November 13, 2014, a 2–1 win over Taiwan in the East Asian Cup.

On June 11, 2015, DeLaGarza started and played all 90 minutes in Guam's first-ever World Cup Qualifier win beating Turkmenistan 1–0. Just a few days later DeLaGarza started and played all 90 minutes, against India, in Guam's second ever World Cup Qualifier win.

DeLaGarza announced his international retirement on April 19, 2020.

== Personal life ==
DeLaGarza's son Luca died on September 4, 2014, only a week after being born. Luca suffered from Hypoplastic left heart syndrome, a rare heart defect. In his son's memory DeLaGarza and his family started the Luca Knows Heart foundation to help other people who have the condition. DeLaGarza was named the 2014 MLS Humanitarian of the Year as a result of his work with the Luca Knows Heart foundation as well his work with other organizations. DeLaGarza is married to Megan, his high school sweetheart, and the couple have three daughters, Noelle, Alexi, and Colette.

DeLaGarza is close friends with Omar Gonzalez, who was his teammate at Maryland from 2006 to 2008 and with the Galaxy from 2009 to 2015.

He is of Native-American heritage through his mother and Mexican and Chamorro through his father. Although he represented the US and Guam at international levels, he was also eligible to represent Mexico. He has a sister named Tabatha.

DeLaGarza modeled his game off of Barcelona and Spain legend Carles Puyol, who, like DeLaGarza, was undersized for a center back and had long hair, which DeLaGarza had as a child.

== Career statistics ==
=== Club ===
Appearances and goals by club, season and competition
Club	Season	League			MLS Cup Playoffs		US Open Cup		CONCACAF Champions League		Total	
Club	Season	Division	Apps	Goals	Apps	Goals	Apps	Goals	Apps	Goals	Apps	Goals
LA Galaxy	2009	MLS	22	1	2	0	—		—		24	1
LA Galaxy	2010	MLS	17	1	3	0	2	0	1	0	23	1
LA Galaxy	2011	MLS	30	0	4	0	2	0	6	0	42	0
LA Galaxy	2012	MLS	30	0	0	0	0	0	3	0	33	0
LA Galaxy	2013	MLS	28	0	2	0	0	0	5	1	35	0
LA Galaxy	2014	MLS	29	0	4	0	2	0	2	0	37	0
LA Galaxy	2015	MLS	24	0	1	0	2	0	1	0	28	0
LA Galaxy	2016	MLS	24	0	0	0	2	0	2	0	28	0
LA Galaxy	Total		204	2	16	0	10	0	20	1	250	3
LA Galaxy II (loan)	2015	USL	1	0	0	0	0	0	—		1	0
Houston Dynamo	2017	MLS	30	0	0	0	0	0	—		30	0
Houston Dynamo	2018	MLS	4	0	—		0	0	—		4	0
Houston Dynamo	2019	MLS	23	0	—		0	0	4	0	27	0
Houston Dynamo	Total		57	0	0	0	0	0	4	0	61	0
Rio Grande Valley FC (loan)	2018	USL	4	0	—		—		—		4	0
Inter Miami CF	2020	MLS	5	0	1	0	—		—		6	0
New England Revolution	2021	MLS	10	0	—		—		—		10	0
New England Revolution	2022	MLS	4	0	0	0	1	0	0	0	5	0
New England Revolution	Total		14	0	0	0	1	0	0	0	15	0
Career total			285	2	17	0	11	0	24	1	337	3

=== International ===
Appearances and goals by national team and year
National team	Year	Apps	Goals
United States	2012	2	0
Total		2	0
Guam	2013	2	0
Guam	2014	2	0
Guam	2015	5	0
Guam	2016	3	0
Guam	2017	0	0
Guam	2018	0	0
Guam	2019	2	0
Total		14	0

== Honors ==
Individual

- College Cup All-Tournament Team: 2008
- Second Team All-ACC Selection: 2008
- Co-Most Valuable Defensive Player Award: 2008
- LA Galaxy Defensive Player of the Year: 2012, 2014
- MLS Team Fair Play Award: 2013, 2022
- MLS Humanitarian of the Year Award: 2014
