= 2014 LA Galaxy season =

American soccer club season

LA Galaxy
2014 season
- Owner: Philip Anschutz (AEG)
- Coach: Bruce Arena
- MLS: Conference: 2nd Overall: 2nd
- MLS Cup playoffs: Winners
- CONCACAF Champions League: Quarterfinals
- U.S. Open Cup: Fifth round
- Top goalscorer: League: Robbie Keane (19 goals); All: Robbie Keane (23 goals)
- Highest home attendance: 27,244 (October 19 vs. Seattle Sounders FC)
- Lowest home attendance: 14,615 (May 21 vs. FC Dallas)
Home colors	Away colors	Third colors

The 2014 LA Galaxy season was the club's nineteenth season of existence, and their nineteenth consecutive season in Major League Soccer, the top tier of American soccer.

The Galaxy won a league-leading fifth MLS Cup by defeating the New England Revolution in the final 2–1 in extra time. The club reached the quarterfinals of the 2013-14 CONCACAF Champions League before being knocked out by Tijuana, and were eliminated in the fifth round of the U.S. Open Cup by the Carolina Railhawks.

All-star Landon Donovan retired at the end of the season, after winning his sixth MLS Cup and fourth with the Galaxy. He would come out of retirement and sign with the Galaxy during the 2016 season.

== Background ==
=== Transfers ===
==== In ====
No.	Pos.	Player	Transferred from	Fee/notes	Date	Source
6	MF	(Bosnia and Herzegovina) Baggio Husidić	(Sweden) Hammarby	Free transfer	November 11, 2013	
16	MF	(Canada) Rob Friend	(Germany) Eintracht Frankfurt	Free transfer	January 13, 2014	
31	DF	(United States) Kyle Venter	(United States) New Mexico Lobos (United States) Real Colorado Foxes	Selected in the 2014 MLS SuperDraft, second round	January 16, 2014	
24	MF	(Sweden) Stefan Ishizaki	(Sweden) Elfsborg	Free transfer	January 30, 2014	
40	FW	(Mexico) Raul Mendiola	Galaxy Youth Academy	Sign	February 21, 2014	
38	FW	(United States) Bradford Jamieson IV	Galaxy Youth Academy	Sign	February 21, 2014	
26	DF	(United States) James Riley	D.C. United	Sign	March 4, 2014	
33	DF	(United States) Dan Gargan	San Jose Earthquakes	Free transfer	March 7, 2014	
9	FW	(United States) Alan Gordon	San Jose Earthquakes	Allocation money	August 11, 2014	

==== Out ====
No.	Pos.	Player	Transferred to	Fee/notes	Date	Source
11	MF	(United States) Colin Clark	TBD	Option declined	December 9, 2013	
15	MF	(France) Laurent Courtois	LA Galaxy II (player/coach)	Option declined	December 9, 2013	
5	DF	(United States) Sean Franklin	D.C. United	Selected in 2013 MLS Re-Entry Draft - Stage One	December 9, 2013	
26	MF	(United States) Michael Stephens	(Norway) Stabæk	Out of contract	December 9, 2013	
6	MF	(United States) Pablo Mastroeni	None	Retired	December 10, 2013	
16	MF	(United States) Hector Jiménez	Columbus Crew	Traded	January 14, 2014	
17	DF	(United States) Bryan Gaul	TBD	Waived	February 28, 2014	
35	DF	(United States) Greg Cochrane	Chicago Fire	Traded for a 2016 MLS SuperDraft pick	March 3, 2014	
9	FW	(Brazil) Samuel	(Brazil) Fluminense	Loan ended	July 10, 2014	
28	DF	(United States) Kofi Opare	D.C. United	Traded for a 2016 MLS SuperDraft second round pick	July 29, 2014	

==== Loan in ====
No.	Pos.	Player	Loaned From	Start	End	Source
9	FW	(Brazil) Samuel	(Brazil) Fluminense	January 7, 2014	December 31, 2014	

==== Loan out ====
No.	Pos.	Player	Loaned To	Start	End	Source
15	FW	(United States) Jose Villarreal	(Mexico) Cruz Azul	December 22, 2013	September 20, 2014	
25	MF	(United States) Rafael Garcia	(United States) LA Galaxy II	March 21, 2014	September 20, 2014	
38	FW	(United States) Bradford Jamieson IV	(United States) LA Galaxy II	March 21, 2014		
32	FW	(United States) Jack McBean	(United States) LA Galaxy II	March 21, 2014	September 20, 2014	
40	FW	(Mexico) Raul Mendiola	(United States) LA Galaxy II	March 21, 2014	September 20, 2014	
28	DF	(United States) Kofi Opare	(United States) LA Galaxy II	March 21, 2014	September 20, 2014	
27	FW	(United States) Charlie Rugg	(United States) LA Galaxy II	March 21, 2014	September 20, 2014	
36	DF	(United States) Oscar Sorto	(United States) LA Galaxy II	March 21, 2014	September 20, 2014	
31	DF	(United States) Kyle Venter	(United States) LA Galaxy II	March 21, 2014	September 20, 2014	
34	MF	(United States) Kenney Walker	(United States) LA Galaxy II	March 21, 2014	September 20, 2014	
14	MF	(United States) Robbie Rogers	(United States) LA Galaxy II	April 11, 2014	September 20, 2014	
12	GK	(United States) Brian Rowe	(United States) LA Galaxy II	April 11, 2014	September 20, 2014	
30	FW	(United States) Chandler Hoffman	(United States) LA Galaxy II	April 11, 2014	September 20, 2014	

== Player information ==
=== Players ===
Note: Flags indicate national team as defined under FIFA eligibility rules; some limited exceptions apply. Players may hold more than one non-FIFA nationality. Squad correct as of May 26, 2014.

No.	Pos.	Nation	Player
1	GK	USA	Brian Perk
2	DF	USA	Todd Dunivant
4	DF	USA	Omar Gonzalez (DP)
6	MF	USA	Baggio Husidić
7	FW	IRL	Robbie Keane (DP & Captain)
8	MF	BRA	Marcelo Sarvas
9	FW	USA	Alan Gordon
10	FW	USA	Landon Donovan (DP & vice-captain)
11	FW	USA	Gyasi Zardes (HGP)
12	GK	USA	Brian Rowe
14	MF	USA	Robbie Rogers
16	FW	CAN	Rob Friend
18	GK	PAN	Jaime Penedo
19	MF	BRA	Juninho
20	DF	GUM	A. J. DeLaGarza
21	DF	USA	Tommy Meyer
22	DF	BRA	Leonardo
24	MF	SWE	Stefan Ishizaki
17	MF	JAM	Jeff Ferguson
30	FW	USA	Chandler Hoffman
31	DF	USA	Kyle Venter
33	DF	USA	Dan Gargan
34	MF	USA	Kenney Walker

==== Out on loan ====
Note: Flags indicate national team as defined under FIFA eligibility rules; some limited exceptions apply. Players may hold more than one non-FIFA nationality.

No.	Pos.	Nation	Player
25	MF	USA	Rafael Garcia (on loan to LA Galaxy II)
27	FW	USA	Charlie Rugg (on loan to LA Galaxy II)
32	FW	USA	Jack McBean (HGP; on loan to LA Galaxy II)
33	MF	USA	Jose Villarreal (HGP; on loan to LA Galaxy II)
36	DF	USA	Oscar Sorto (HGP; on loan to LA Galaxy II)
38	FW	USA	Bradford Jamieson IV (HGP; on loan to LA Galaxy II)
40	FW	MEX	Raul Mendiola (HGP; on loan to LA Galaxy II)

== Friendlies ==
All times in Pacific Time Zone.

=== Preseason ===
February 5	LA Galaxy	2–2	Chivas USA	Carson, California
10:30	Friend 5'; Juninho 20'	Report	Barron 72'; Fondy 80'	Stadium: StubHub Center; Attendance: Closed-Door

February 8	LA Galaxy	2–1	FC Shirak	Carson, California
18:00	Samuel 42'; Zardes 75'	Report	Déblé 35'	Stadium: StubHub Center; Attendance: 12,447

February 11	Pumas UNAM	2–1	LA Galaxy	Mexico City, Mexico
12:00	Sosa 15'; Sosa 70'	Report	Venter 78'	Stadium: Estadio Olímpico Universitario; Attendance: Closed-Door

February 15 Central California Cup	LA Galaxy	2–1	San Jose Earthquakes	Fresno, California
19:00	Sarvas 31'; Zardes 54'	Report	Morton 67'	Stadium: Chukchansi Park; Attendance: 12,659

February 19	LA Galaxy	2–0	UCLA Bruins	Carson, California
	Hoffman 27'; Keane 62' (pen.)	Report		Stadium: StubHub Center; Attendance: Closed-Door

February 22	LA Galaxy	3–0	LA Galaxy II	Carson, California
19:30	Keane 2', 24' (pen.); Samuel 68'	Report		Stadium: StubHub Center

=== Mid-season ===
July 23	LA Galaxy	0–7	Manchester United	Pasadena, California
19:30	Keane (yellow card) 48'	Report	Welbeck 13'; Rooney 42' (pen.), 45+1'; James 62', 84'; Young 88', 90'	Stadium: Rose Bowl; Attendance: 86,432; Referee: Baldomero Toledo

== Major League Soccer ==
=== Tables ===
==== Western Conference ====
Pos	Team	Pld	W	L	T	GF	GA	GD	Pts	Qualification
1	Seattle Sounders FC	34	20	10	4	65	50	+15	64	MLS Cup Conference Semifinals
2	LA Galaxy	34	17	7	10	69	37	+32	61	MLS Cup Conference Semifinals
3	Real Salt Lake	34	15	8	11	54	39	+15	56	MLS Cup Conference Semifinals
4	FC Dallas	34	16	12	6	55	45	+10	54	MLS Cup Knockout round
5	Vancouver Whitecaps FC	34	12	8	14	42	40	+2	50	MLS Cup Knockout round
6	Portland Timbers	34	12	9	13	61	52	+9	49	
7	Chivas USA	34	9	19	6	29	61	−32	33	
8	Colorado Rapids	34	8	18	8	43	62	−19	32	
9	San Jose Earthquakes	34	6	16	12	35	50	−15	30	

Source: MLS

==== Overall ====
Pos	Team	Pld	W	L	T	GF	GA	GD	Pts	Qualification
1	Seattle Sounders FC (S)	34	20	10	4	65	50	+15	64	CONCACAF Champions League
2	LA Galaxy (C)	34	17	7	10	69	37	+32	61	CONCACAF Champions League
3	D.C. United	34	17	9	8	52	37	+15	59	CONCACAF Champions League
4	Real Salt Lake	34	15	8	11	54	39	+15	56	CONCACAF Champions League
5	New England Revolution	34	17	13	4	51	46	+5	55	
6	FC Dallas	34	16	12	6	55	45	+10	54	
7	Columbus Crew	34	14	10	10	52	42	+10	52	
8	New York Red Bulls	34	13	10	11	55	50	+5	50	
9	Vancouver Whitecaps FC	34	12	8	14	42	40	+2	50	CONCACAF Champions League
10	Sporting Kansas City	34	14	13	7	48	41	+7	49	
11	Portland Timbers	34	12	9	13	61	52	+9	49	
12	Philadelphia Union	34	10	12	12	51	51	0	42	
13	Toronto FC	34	11	15	8	44	54	−10	41	
14	Houston Dynamo	34	11	17	6	39	58	−19	39	
15	Chicago Fire	34	6	10	18	41	51	−10	36	
16	Chivas USA	34	9	19	6	29	61	−32	33	
17	Colorado Rapids	34	8	18	8	43	62	−19	32	
18	San Jose Earthquakes	34	6	16	12	35	50	−15	30	
19	Montreal Impact	34	6	18	10	38	58	−20	28	

Source: MLS
Rules for classification: 1) points; 2) head-to-head record; 3) goal difference; 4) number of goals scored
(C) MLS Cup Champion; (S) Supporters' Shield

=== Regular season ===
Win Draw Loss Postponed

All times in Pacific Time Zone.

March 8 1	LA Galaxy	0–1	Real Salt Lake	Carson, California
19:30	Riley (yellow card) 45'	Report	Morales (yellow card) 35'; Mulholland (yellow card) 79'; Plata 80'; Saborío (yellow card) 87'; Rimando (yellow card) 90+3'	Stadium: StubHub Center; Attendance: 25,634; Referee: Javier Santos

March 22 2	Real Salt Lake	1–1	LA Galaxy	Sandy, Utah
13:00	Saborío 19', (yellow card) 63'; Morales (yellow card) 55'	Report	Ishizaki (yellow card) 18'; Keane 34'	Stadium: Rio Tinto Stadium; Attendance: 20,466; Referee: Ismail Elfath

April 6 3	Chivas USA	0–3	LA Galaxy	Carson, California
12:00	Torres (yellow card) 40'; Rosales (yellow card) 48'	Report	Gargan (yellow card) 26'; Keane 37'; Ishizaki 42'; Husidić 56'	Stadium: StubHub Center; Attendance: 15,008; Referee: Drew Fischer

April 12 4	LA Galaxy	1–0	Vancouver Whitecaps FC	Carson, California
19:30	Keane 47'	Report		Stadium: StubHub Center; Attendance: 20,847; Referee: Jair Marrufo

April 19 5	Vancouver Whitecaps FC	2–2	LA Galaxy	Vancouver, British Columbia
16:00	O'Brien (yellow card) 1'; Mattocks 67'; Manneh 86'	Report	Husidić (yellow card) 34'; Ishizaki 38'; Keane 77'	Stadium: BC Place; Attendance: 21,000; Referee: Silviu Petrescu

May 3 6	Colorado Rapids	1–0	LA Galaxy	Commerce City, Colorado
18:00	Sánchez 20'	Report	Juninho (yellow card) 88'; Samuel (yellow card) 90+3'	Stadium: Dick's Sporting Goods Park; Attendance: 14,040; Referee: Hilario Grajeda

May 11 7	Portland Timbers	1–1	LA Galaxy	Portland, Oregon
11:30	Fernández (yellow card) 34'; Valeri 90+5'	Report	Gargan (yellow card) 58'; Keane 90+2'	Stadium: Providence Park; Attendance: 20,804; Referee: Armando Villarreal

May 17 8	Houston Dynamo	1–0	LA Galaxy	Houston, Texas
17:30	Taylor (yellow card) 17'; Barnes 61'	Report	DeLaGarza (yellow card) 19'; Opare (yellow card) 76'	Stadium: BBVA Compass Stadium; Attendance: 22,233; Referee: Edvin Jurisevic

May 21 9	LA Galaxy	2–1	FC Dallas	Carson, California
19:30	Keane 24'; Opare (yellow card) 37'; Zardes 44'	Report	Akindele (yellow card) 43', (goal) 65'; Watson (yellow card) 71'	Stadium: StubHub Center; Attendance: 14,615; Referee: Allen Chapman

May 25 10	LA Galaxy	4–1	Philadelphia Union	Carson, California
17:00	Leonardo 2'; Juninho (yellow card) 31'; Donovan 49', 81'; Keane 64'	Report	Edu 88' (pen.)	Stadium: StubHub Center; Attendance: 21,010; Referee: Jorge Gonzalez

June 1 11	Chicago Fire	1–1	LA Galaxy	Bridgeview, Illinois
13:00	Hurtado (yellow card) 7'; Larentowicz 68' (pen.)	Report	Donovan 74', (yellow card) 76'	Stadium: Toyota Park; Attendance: 17,487; Referee: Hilario Grajeda

June 8 12	LA Galaxy	1–1	Chivas USA	Carson, California
17:00	Zardes 35'	Report	Erick Torres 20'	Stadium: StubHub Center; Attendance: 19,756; Referee: Jair Marrufo

June 28 13	San Jose Earthquakes	0–1	LA Galaxy	Stanford, California
19:30		Report	Zardes 61'; Gargan (yellow card) 67'; Donovan (yellow card) 90'	Stadium: Stanford Stadium; Attendance: 50,006; Referee: Baldomero Toledo

July 4 14	LA Galaxy	2–2	Portland Timbers	Carson, California
20:00	Gargan (yellow card) 40'; Sarvas 65'; McKenzie 86' (o.g.)	Report	Valeri (yellow card) 12', (goal) 67'; Villafaña 70'; Chará (yellow card) 76'	Stadium: StubHub Center; Attendance: 27,000; Referee: Jair Marrufo

July 12 15	LA Galaxy	1–0	Real Salt Lake	Carson, California
19:30	Zardes 20'; Sarvas (yellow card) 90+4'	Report	García (yellow card) 90+4'; Rimando (yellow card) 90+7'	Stadium: StubHub Center; Attendance: 19,882; Referee: Silviu Petrescu

July 16 16	LA Galaxy	5–1	New England Revolution	Carson, California
19:30	Keane 10', 78'; DeLaGarza (yellow card) 11'; Zardes 18', 48'; Gargan (red card) 36'; Leonardo (yellow card) 51'; Ishizaki 75'; Hoffman (yellow card) 82'	Report	Soares (red card) 29'; Nguyen 38' (pen.); Bengtson (yellow card) 84'	Stadium: StubHub Center; Attendance: 17,741; Referee: Ricardo Salazar

July 19 17	Sporting Kansas City	2–1	LA Galaxy	Kansas City, Kansas
15:00	Feilhaber 10'; Olum 61', (yellow card) 66'; Peterson (yellow card) 90+3'	Report	Keane 79', (yellow card) 88'	Stadium: Sporting Park; Attendance: 21,493; Referee: Chris Penso

July 28 18	Seattle Sounders FC	0–3	LA Galaxy	Seattle, Washington
17:00	Anibaba (yellow card) 69'; Pineda (yellow card) 79'	Report	Zardes 8'; Donovan 18', (yellow card) 27'; Ishizaki 36'; Gonzalez (yellow card) 45+3'	Stadium: CenturyLink Field; Attendance: 39,304; Referee: Hilario Grajeda

August 2 19	LA Galaxy	3–1	Portland Timbers	Carson, California
11:30	Zardes 45+3'; Keane 73', 85' (pen.); Sarvas (yellow card) 75'	Report	Valeri 14'; Chará (yellow card) 81'	Stadium: StubHub Center; Attendance: 20,089; Referee: Kevin Stott

August 8 20	LA Galaxy	2–2	San Jose Earthquakes	Carson, California
19:30	Zardes 29'; Gonzalez 49'	Report	Wondolowski 18'; García 31'; Francis (yellow card) 51'; Cronin (yellow card) 79'	Stadium: StubHub Center; Attendance: 19,719; Referee: Alan Kelly

August 16 21	Columbus Crew	4–1	LA Galaxy	Columbus, Ohio
16:30	Meram 23'; Finlay 33'; Speas 75'; González 84'	Report	Zardes 49'	Stadium: Columbus Crew Stadium; Attendance: 20,729; Referee: Armando Villarreal

August 20 22	Colorado Rapids	3–4	LA Galaxy	Commerce City, Colorado
18:00	Hairston 14'; Buddle 17'; Burch 30'	Report	Keane 20'; Gonzalez 55'; Gordon 68'; Donovan 80'; Sarvas (yellow card) 85'	Stadium: Dick's Sporting Goods Park; Attendance: 14,011; Referee: Ricardo Salazar

August 23 23	LA Galaxy	2–0	Vancouver Whitecaps FC	Carson, California
19:30	Donovan 4'; Gargan (yellow card) 21'; Sarvas 32', (yellow card) 80'; DeLaGarza (yellow card) 78'; Gonzalez (yellow card) 83'	Report	Ballouchy (yellow card) 60'; Waston (yellow card) 87'; Leverón (red card) 90'	Stadium: StubHub Center; Attendance: 21,637; Referee: Allen Chapman

August 27 24	LA Galaxy	4–1	D.C. United	Carson, California
19:30	Gordon 2'; Donovan (yellow card) 18', (goal) 75' (pen.); Gonzalez 25'; Husidić 45+1'	Report	Silva (yellow card) 21'; Leonardo 58' (o.g.); Espíndola (yellow card) 81'	Stadium: StubHub Center; Attendance: 16,044; Referee: Kevin Stott

August 31 25	Chivas USA	0–3	LA Galaxy	Carson, California
17:00	Jean-Baptiste (yellow card) 22'; Erick Torres (red card) 75'	Report	Husidić (yellow card) 35'; Zardes 41', 71'; Keane 68'	Stadium: StubHub Center; Attendance: 18,652; Referee: Ismail Elfath

September 5 26	LA Galaxy	6–0	Colorado Rapids	Carson, California
19:30	Donovan 5' (pen.), 47' (pen.); Husidić 30', 86', (yellow card) 30'; Zardes 45+2', 75'; Ishizaki (yellow card) 50'	Report	Nasco (red card) 1'; Burch (yellow card) 57'; Piermayr (yellow card) 70'; Hairston (yellow card) 84'	Stadium: StubHub Center; Attendance: 18,145; Referee: Baldomero Toledo

September 10 27	Montreal Impact	2–2	LA Galaxy	Montreal, Quebec
16:30	Di Vaio 28'; Piatti 43', (yellow card) 53'; Felipe (yellow card) 80'; Mallace (yellow card) 87'	Report	Gargan (yellow card) 37'; Donovan (yellow card) 44'; Zardes 59'; Gordon 64'	Stadium: Saputo Stadium; Attendance: 13,916; Referee: Hilario Grajeda

September 14 28	San Jose Earthquakes	1–1	LA Galaxy	Santa Clara, California
12:00	Hernandez (yellow card) 37'; Harris (yellow card) 63'; Lenhart (yellow card) 64'; Wondolowski 66'; Pierazzi (yellow card) 69'; Cronin (yellow card) 74'	Report	Gonzalez (yellow card) 25', (goal) 28'; Rogers (yellow card) 60'; Juninho (yellow card) 75'; Keane (yellow card) 79'	Stadium: Buck Shaw Stadium; Attendance: 10,525; Referee: Sorin Stoica

September 20 29	LA Galaxy	2–1	FC Dallas	Carson, California
19:30	Keane 62'; Gonzalez (yellow card) 69'; Sarvas (yellow card) 74'; Gordon 84'; Donovan (yellow card) 90'	Report	Acosta (yellow card) 23'; Ulloa (yellow card) 35'; Hernandez (yellow card) 42'; Pérez 54'	Stadium: StubHub Center; Attendance: 22,863; Referee: Kevin Stott

September 28 30	LA Galaxy	4–0	New York Red Bulls	Carson, California
17:30	Keane 8', 82'; Donovan 50'; Zardes 69'	Report	Olave (yellow card) 67'	Stadium: StubHub Center; Attendance: 25,102; Referee: Armando Villarreal

October 4 31	LA Galaxy	3–0	Toronto FC	Carson, California
19:30	Keane 22', 25'; Sarvas (yellow card) 66'; Gordon 90+3'	Report	Osorio (yellow card) 66'	Stadium: StubHub Center; Attendance: 24,064; Referee: Baldomero Toledo

October 12 32	FC Dallas	2–1	LA Galaxy	Frisco, Texas
16:00	Texeira 52'; Castillo 87'; Hernandez (red card) 89'	Report	DeLaGarza (yellow card) 17'; Ishizaki 22'; Riley (yellow card) 44'	Stadium: Toyota Stadium; Attendance: 19,039; Referee: Alan Kelly

October 19 33	LA Galaxy	2–2	Seattle Sounders FC	Carson, California
17:30	Rogers (yellow card) 22'; Gonzalez (yellow card) 43' (yellow-red card) 88'; Husidić 45+1'; Sarvas 50'	Report	Scott (yellow card) 26'; Pineda (yellow card) 27'; Dempsey (yellow card) 36', (goal) 69'; Martins (yellow card) 57'; Neagle 72'	Stadium: StubHub Center; Attendance: 27,244; Referee: Ismail Elfath

October 25 34	Seattle Sounders FC	2–0	LA Galaxy	Seattle, Washington
11:30	Dempsey (yellow card) 15'; Scott (yellow card) 51'; Pineda (yellow card) 71'; Pappa 85', 90+5'	Report	Gargan (yellow card) 22'; Donovan (yellow card) 38'; Sarvas (yellow card) 71'	Stadium: CenturyLink Field; Attendance: 57,673; Referee: Mark Geiger

=== Playoffs ===
==== Western Conference Semifinal ====
November 1 First leg	Real Salt Lake	0–0	LA Galaxy	Sandy, Utah
17:00 PDT	Beltran (yellow card) 63'; Wingert (yellow card) 67'	Report	Gonzalez (yellow card) 53'; Rogers (yellow card) 77'	Stadium: Rio Tinto Stadium; Attendance: 20,713; Referee: Silviu Petrescu

November 9 Second leg	LA Galaxy	5–0 (5–0 agg.)	Real Salt Lake	Carson, California
16:30 PST	Donovan 10', 54', 72', (yellow card) 81'; Keane 20'; Sarvas 63'	Report	Saborío (yellow card) 79'; Beltran (yellow card) 86'	Stadium: StubHub Center; Attendance: 27,000; Referee: Jair Marrufo

==== Western Conference Final ====
November 23 First leg	LA Galaxy	1–0	Seattle Sounders FC	Carson, California
14:00 PST	DeLaGarza (yellow card) 8'; Ishizaki (yellow card) 35'; Sarvas 52'	Report	Yedlin (yellow card) 3'; Scott (yellow card) 37'	Stadium: StubHub Center; Attendance: 27,000; Referee: Kevin Stott

November 30 Second leg	Seattle Sounders FC	2–1 (2–2 agg.)	LA Galaxy	Seattle, Washington
18:20 PST	Evans 26'; Dempsey 32'	Report	Sarvas (yellow card) 35'; Juninho 54'; Penedo (yellow card) 90+2'	Stadium: CenturyLink Field; Attendance: 46,758; Referee: Jair Marrufo
Note: LA Galaxy won on an away goals rule.

=== MLS Cup ===
December 7	LA Galaxy	2–1 (a.e.t.)	New England Revolution	Carson, California
12:00 PST	Donovan (yellow card) 45+1'; Zardes 52'; Rogers (yellow card) 82'; Keane (yellow card) 92', (goal) 111'; Sarvas (yellow card) 113'; Gordon (yellow card) 113'	Report	Farrell (yellow card) 62'; Tierney 79'; Jones (yellow card) 113'	Stadium: StubHub Center; Attendance: 27,000; Referee: Mark Geiger

== U.S. Open Cup ==
As an MLS team, the Galaxy entered in the fourth round.

=== Fourth round ===
June 18 Fourth round	Arizona United	1–2	(California) LA Galaxy	Peoria, Arizona
19:30 MST	Kassel 37'; Okafor (yellow card) 74'	Report	Rogers (yellow card) 20'; Zardes 51', 53'	Stadium: Peoria Sports Complex; Attendance: 4,018; Referee: Alejandro Mariscal

=== Fifth round ===
June 24 Fifth round	Carolina Railhawks (North Carolina)	1–0 (a.e.t.)	(California) LA Galaxy	Cary, North Carolina
19:00 ET	Low (yellow card) 35'; Scott (yellow card) 44'; Jackson 105'	Report	DeLaGarza (yellow card) 45'; Sarvas (yellow card) 113'	Stadium: WakeMed Soccer Park; Attendance: 3,000; Referee: Fotis Bazakos

== CONCACAF Champions League ==
=== Quarterfinals ===
March 12, 2014 First leg	LA Galaxy (United States)	1–0	(Mexico) Tijuana	Carson, California
22:00 ET	Samuel 11'	Report		Stadium: StubHub Center; Attendance: 15,159; Referee: Enrico Wijngaarde (Suriname)

March 18, 2014 Second leg	Tijuana (Mexico)	4–2 (4–3 agg.)	(United States) LA Galaxy	Tijuana, Baja California
22:00 ET	Ayoví 2', 9'; Benedetto 26'; Ruiz 82'	Report	Keane 47', 84'	Stadium: Estadio Caliente; Attendance: 19,333; Referee: Roberto Moreno (Panama)

== See also ==
- 2014 in American soccer
