= Leonardo (footballer, born 1988) =

Brazilian footballer

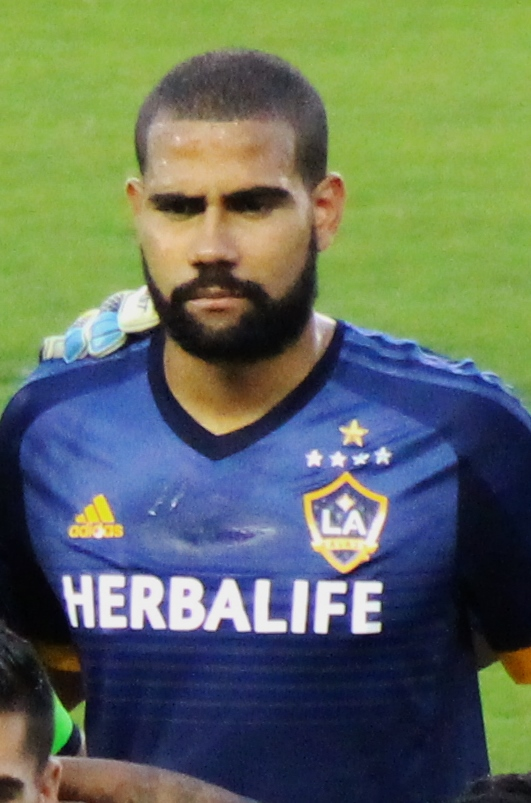

Personal information
- Full name: José Leonardo Ribeiro da Silva
- Date of birth: February 5, 1988 (age 38)
- Place of birth: São Paulo, Brazil
- Height: 6 ft 2 in (1.88 m)
- Position: Centre back

Youth career
- 1999–2009: São Paulo

Senior career*
Years	Team	Apps	(Gls)
2009–2011	São Paulo	0	(0)
2009	→ Toledo (loan)	0	(0)
2010–2011	→ LA Galaxy (loan)	17	(1)
2012–2016	LA Galaxy	68	(1)
2014	→ LA Galaxy II (loan)	1	(0)
2016	→ LA Galaxy II (loan)	1	(0)
2017–2018	Houston Dynamo	54	(3)
2019	Orange County SC	16	(3)
- * Club domestic league appearances and goals as of 20 April 2021

José Leonardo Ribeiro da Silva (born February 8, 1988), commonly known as Leonardo, is a Brazilian former footballer who played as a defender.

== Career ==
Leonardo was born in São Paulo and played for the São Paulo youth teams before being promoted into the senior team. He was sent out on loan to Major League Soccer team Los Angeles Galaxy in 2010 along with fellow Brazilians from the club Alex Cazumba and Juninho.

He made his debut for the team on March 27, 2010, in Galaxy's opening game of the 2010 MLS season against New England Revolution. Leonardo would deal with injuries in 2010, but made 10 appearances and helped the Galaxy win the 2010 Supporters Shield.

He scored his first professional goal on April 2, 2011, a headed goal from a David Beckham cross, in a 1–0 win over Philadelphia Union. However he would suffer a torn ACL and a torn LCL on April 17, 2011, forcing him to miss the rest of the 2011 season.

On February 7, 2012, Los Angeles announced it had acquired the full rights to Leonardo on a free transfer from São Paulo. Leonardo would miss most of the 2012 season due to injuries, making 0 league appearances and only appearing in 1 US Open Cup match.

Leonardo would recover from his injuries for the 2013 season and established himself as a starter for the 2014 season as part of a backline that allowed a league low 35 goals. He would start in 3 of the Galaxy's playoff games, including the final as LA won their 5th MLS Cup. Leonardo enjoyed a good season for 2015, making 29 appearances across all competitions and being named the Galaxy defender of the year. However the team lost 3-2 in the first round of the playoffs to Sporting Kansas City.

Leonardo missed some time for a leg injury and also fell out of favor in 2016, only making 7 appearances in all competitions. On December 22, 2016 Leonardo was selected by the Houston Dynamo in stage 2 of the 2016 Re-Entry Draft. He signed with the Dynamo on January 5, 2017.

Leonardo made his Dynamo debut on March 4, 2017 in a 3-2 win over Seattle Sounders FC. He scored his first goal for the Dynamo on May 31 against Real Salt Lake. He made 30 league appearances on the year and helped the Dynamo qualify for the playoffs for the first time since 2013. He would make 3 appearances in the playoffs as the Dynamo reached the Western Conference Finals, where they would fall to Seattle.

In 2018, Leonardo helped the Dynamo win the 2018 US Open Cup, the first in club history, however he missed the final due to injury. Overall he enjoyed a healthy season, only missing 4 games. Leonardo also emerged as a leader of the team, wearing the captain's armband on 4 occasions.

On March 12, 2019, he joined USL Championship side Orange County SC.

== Career statistics ==
As of November 17, 2018

Club	Season	League			US Open Cup		Playoffs		Continental		Total	
Club	Season	Division	Apps	Goals	Apps	Goals	Apps	Goals	Apps	Goals	Apps	Goals
LA Galaxy	2010	MLS	10	0	2	0	0	0	—		12	0
LA Galaxy	2011	MLS	7	1	0	0	0	0	2	0	9	1
LA Galaxy	2012	MLS	0	0	1	0	0	0	0	0	1	0
LA Galaxy	2013	MLS	14	0	1	0	0	0	4	0	19	0
LA Galaxy	2014	MLS	24	1	1	0	3	0	3	0	31	1
LA Galaxy	2015	MLS	26	0	2	0	1	0	0	0	29	0
LA Galaxy	2016	MLS	4	0	3	0	0	0	0	0	7	0
LA Galaxy	Total		85	2	10	0	4	0	9	0	108	2
LA Galaxy II	2014	USL	1	0	0	0	0	0	—		1	0
LA Galaxy II	2016	USL	1	0	—		0	0	—		1	0
LA Galaxy II	Total		2	0	0	0	0	0	0	0	2	0
Houston Dynamo	2017	MLS	30	2	0	0	3	0	—		33	2
Houston Dynamo	2018	MLS	24	1	1	0	—		—		25	1
Houston Dynamo	Total		54	3	1	0	3	0	0	0	58	3
Career Totals			141	5	11	0	7	0	9	0	168	5

== Honors ==
Los Angeles Galaxy

- MLS Cup (3): 2011, 2012, 2014
- Supporters' Shield (2): 2010, 2011
- Major League Soccer Western Conference Championship (2): 2011, 2012

Houston Dynamo

- US Open Cup: 2018
