= Alex Cazumba =

Brazilian footballer (born 1988)

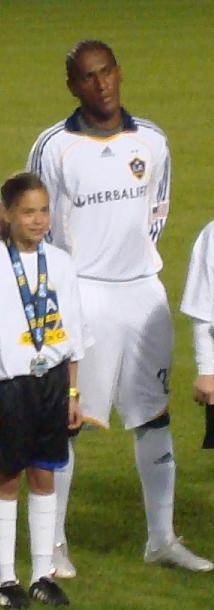

Personal information
- Full name: Alex dos Santos Cazumba
- Date of birth: June 30, 1988 (age 38)
- Place of birth: Amélia Rodrigues, Brazil
- Height: 6 ft 1 in (1.85 m)
- Position: Left back

Youth career
- 2005–2006: São Paulo

Senior career*
Years	Team	Apps	(Gls)
2007–2012	São Paulo		
2007	→ Rio Claro (loan)		
2007	→ Juventude (loan)		
2008	→ Figueirense (loan)		
2009	→ Toledo (loan)		
2009	→ Vila Nova (loan)		
2010	→ Los Angeles Galaxy (loan)		
2011	→ Ituano (loan)		
2011	→ Botafogo-SP (loan)		
2012	→ XV de Piracicaba (loan)		
2012	Ferroviária		
2012	Skoda Xanthi		
2013	→ Operário Ferroviário (loan)		
2013	→ Marcilio Dias (loan)		
2013	Vitória		
2014	Bahia de Feira		
2014–2015	Botafogo da Paraiba		
2016	América de Natal		
2016	Nacional de Manaus		
2017	Passo Fundo		
2017	Mogi Mirim		
2018–	Bahia de Feira		
- * Club domestic league appearances and goals as of 11 April 2011

Feira FC 2026 Alex dos Santos Cazumba (born 30 June 1988), usually known as Alex Cazumba, Alequito or Alex, is a Brazilian footballer currently playing for Feira FC, on loan from Bahia Feira FC.

== Career ==
Alex Cazumba played for the São Paulo youth teams before being promoted into the senior team in 2007. He was loaned out to several Brazilian regional over the next couple of years, making first team appearances for Juventude and Figueirense.

He was sent out on loan to Major League Soccer team Los Angeles Galaxy in 2010 along with fellow Brazilians from the club Leonardo and Juninho.

He made his debut for the team on March 27, 2010, in Galaxy's opening game of the 2010 MLS season against New England Revolution.

His first MLS goal came on June 5, 2010, in a 4–1 defeat of the Houston Dynamo.

== Honours ==
São Paulo

- Campeonato Brasileiro Série A (1): 2008

Los Angeles Galaxy

- Major League Soccer Supporter's Shield (1): 2010

Botafogo da Paraíba

- Campeonato Paraibano (1): 2014
