= Amélia Rodrigues =

Municipality of Bahia State, Brazil

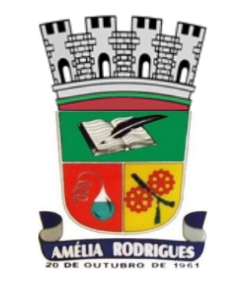
- Flag Coat of arms

- Coordinates: 12°24′32″S 38°45′32″W
- Country: Brazil
- Region: Nordeste
- State: Bahia
- Founded: 20 October 1961

Population (2020)
  - Total: 25,048
- Time zone: UTC−3 (BRT)
- Postal code: 2901106

Amélia Rodrigues is a municipality in the state of Bahia in the North-East region of Brazil.

== See also ==
- List of municipalities in Bahia
