= Omar Gonzalez =

American soccer player (born 1988)

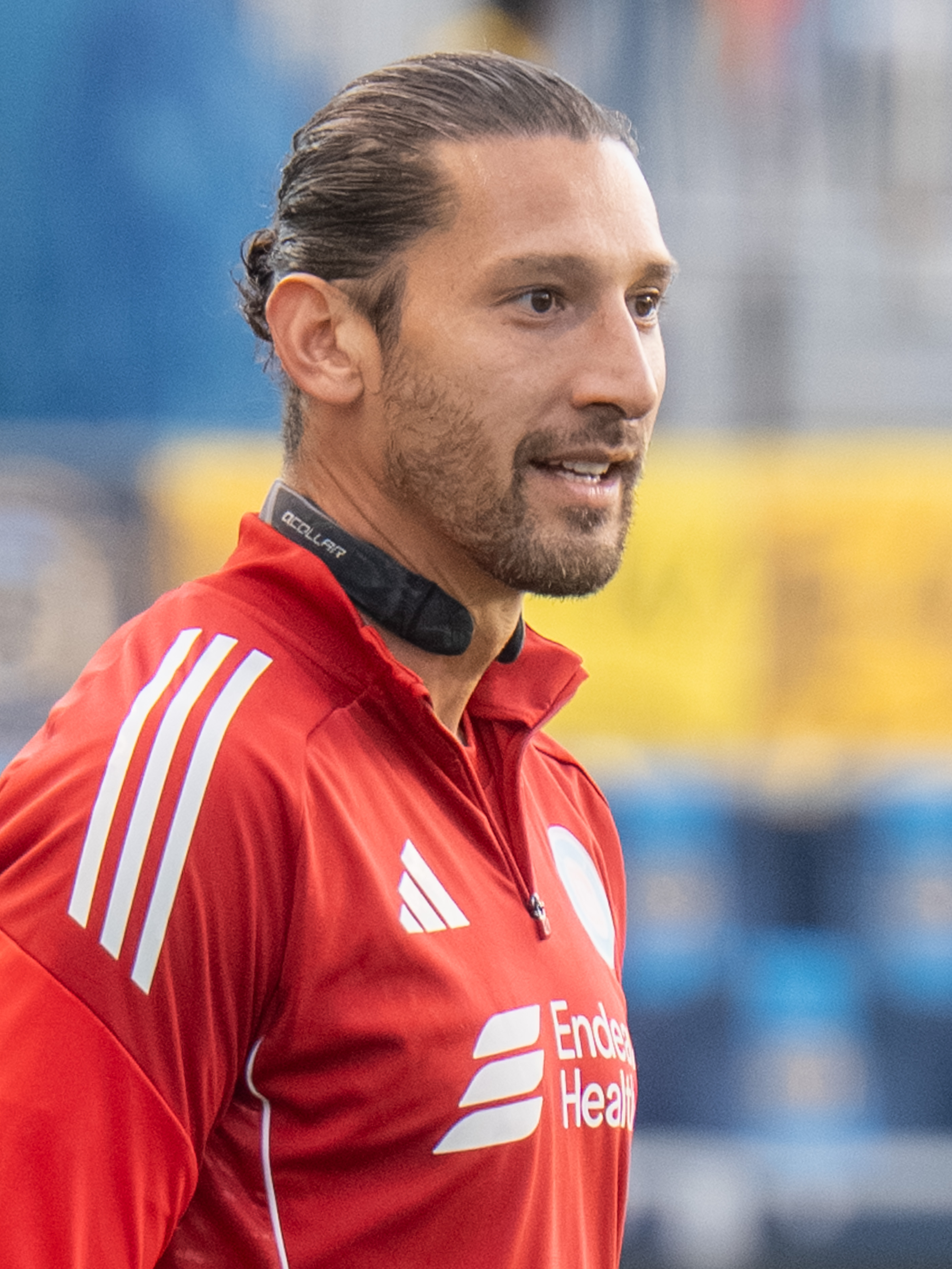
- Gonzalez with the Chicago Fire in 2025

Personal information
- Full name: Omar Alejandro Gonzalez
- Date of birth: 11 October 1988 (age 38)
- Place of birth: Dallas, Texas, U.S.
- Height: 6 ft 5 in (1.96 m)
- Position: Center-back

Team information
- Current team: Chicago Fire FC II
- Number: 34

Youth career
- 2001–2006: Dallas Texans
- 2005: IMG Soccer Academy

College career
Years	Team	Apps	(Gls)
2006–2008	Maryland Terrapins	69	(7)

Senior career*
Years	Team	Apps	(Gls)
2009–2015	LA Galaxy	180	(12)
2012	→ 1. FC Nürnberg (loan)	0	(0)
2016–2019	Pachuca	59	(1)
2018–2019	→ Atlas (loan)	28	(2)
2019–2021	Toronto FC	64	(4)
2022–2023	New England Revolution	32	(1)
2024	FC Dallas	15	(0)
2025	Chicago Fire	12	(0)
2026–	Chicago Fire FC II	0	(0)

International career^{‡}
2005	United States U17	2	(0)
2007	United States U18	3	(2)
2010–2019	United States	52	(3)
Medal record
Representing United States
Winner	CONCACAF Gold Cup	2013
Winner	CONCACAF Gold Cup	2017
Runner-up	CONCACAF Gold Cup	2019
Men's Soccer
- * Club domestic league appearances and goals as of September 6, 2025 ‡ National team caps and goals as of June 30, 2019

Omar Alejandro Gonzalez (born October 11, 1988) is an American professional soccer player who plays as a center-back for MLS Next Pro club Chicago Fire FC II.

A college soccer player for the Maryland Terrapins, Gonzalez joined the LA Galaxy in the 2009 MLS SuperDraft, and went on to play 180 regular-season games for them, winning the MLS Cup in 2011, 2012 and 2014. He was named the MLS Rookie of the Year in 2009 and the MLS Defender of the Year in 2011.

Gonzalez represented the United States at the 2014 FIFA World Cup and four CONCACAF Gold Cups, winning the 2013 and 2017 editions. He last played for the national team in 2019.

== Club career ==
=== Early life and college ===
Gonzalez played youth soccer for the Dallas Texans Soccer Club, and played college soccer at the University of Maryland, College Park, where he won the 2008 College Cup championship, was named to the NCAA/Adidas All-American First Team and First Team All-ACC and was named the ACC Defensive Player of the Year as a sophomore in 2007.

=== LA Galaxy ===
Gonzalez was drafted in the first round (3rd overall) of the 2009 MLS SuperDraft by the Los Angeles Galaxy. Gonzalez began a regular feature in the Galaxy lineup from the start, and scored his first professional goal on April 4, 2009, against Colorado Rapids. He was named MLS Rookie of the Year for helping lead the Galaxy from a last-place finish in 2008.

In the 2010 season, Gonzalez scored a total of three goals including in the second leg of the Conference Semifinals.

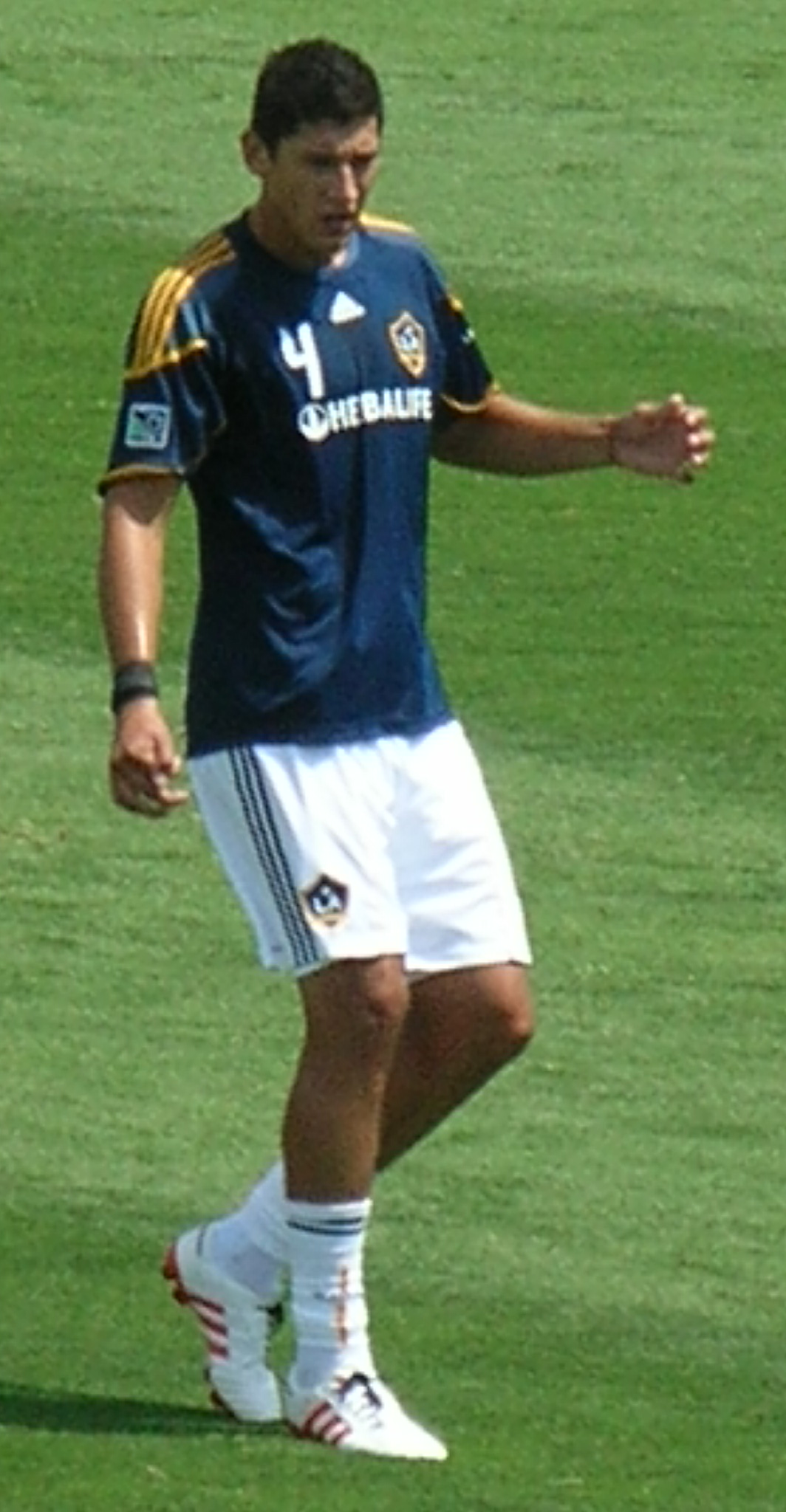
Omar Gonzalez playing San Jose on August 21, 2010

In January 2012, Gonzalez was loaned to 1. FC Nürnberg of the Bundesliga until mid-February. During his first training session with his new club, Gonzalez suffered a torn anterior cruciate ligament to his left knee after a collision with national teammate Timothy Chandler. He immediately headed back to the U.S. to undergo surgery.

In August 2013, Gonzalez became Galaxy's third Designated Player after signing a new multi-year contract, rumored to be an annual average of more than $1.5 million. Gonzalez is the first pure center back to ever earn a Designated Player contract in Major League Soccer.

=== Pachuca ===
On December 22, 2015, Gonzalez was sold to Pachuca of Liga MX, ending his seven-season stay with the Galaxy. During their press conference with a Star Wars theme, Gonzalez was unveiled as Star Wars character Darth Vader in presentation.

Gonzalez made his league debut on January 8, 2016, in a 1–1 draw against Club Tijuana at Estadio Caliente. In his debut, Gonzalez registered an assist to Franco Jara to tie the match in the 43rd minute. On February 7, 2016, Gonzalez scored his first goal for Pachuca late against Pumas UNAM to salvage a 1–1 draw. Gonzalez won the Liga MX championship with Pachuca in his first season being a key player in the team's defense. At the start of the Apertura 2016 Gonzalez changed jersey numbers and was given the number 4 after the loan of Hugo Isaác Rodríguez ended.

=== Toronto FC ===
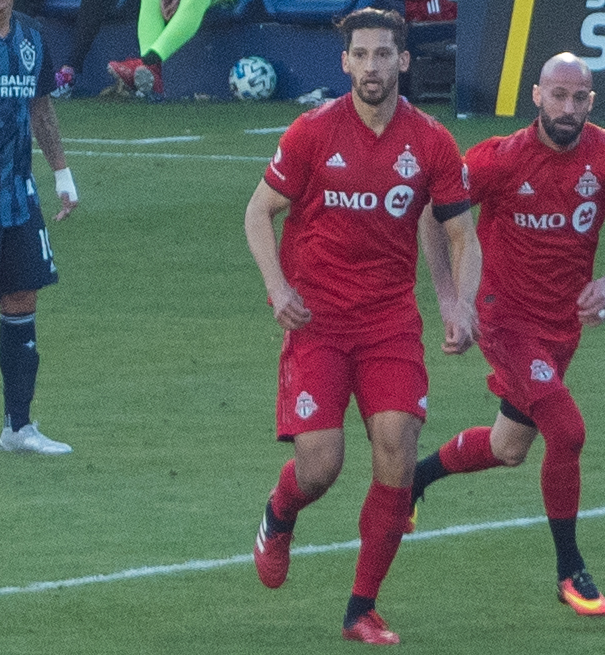
Omar Gonzalez playing for Toronto FC against the LA Galaxy

On June 3, 2019, it was announced that Gonzalez would join Toronto FC from Pachuca once the transfer market officially opened on July 9. He was signed using Targeted Allocation Money (TAM). He made his debut for Toronto on 14 July, against rivals Montreal Impact. He scored his first goal for the club on 29 September against the Chicago Fire. In December 2021, Toronto FC confirmed that Gonzalez' contract option would not be picked up for the 2022 season.

=== New England Revolution ===
On December 22, 2021, Gonzalez signed with the New England Revolution through the 2023 season.

Gonzalez had a difficult start to the 2022 season for his new club. Through June 1, Gonzalez, who was primarily signed as a backup but was forced into regular service due to injuries to Henry Kessler and Jon Bell, ranked in the bottom half of the MLS for defenders in successful pressures and blocks and in the bottom 25% for tackles, interceptions, and various other passing-out-of-the-back metrics. Gonzalez's plus-minus was second-worst amongst center backs, and his plus-minus net was the worst amongst center backs at −1.08, according to stats from Football Reference.

On April 9 Miami's Bryce Duke beat Gonzalez to cross to striker Leonardo Campana, who beat Brad Knighton from close range to give Miami a 3–2 lead in the 88th minute.

On May 7, 2022, New England surrendered an 89th-minute equalizer to Columbus Crew after Gonzalez lost his mark on Crew winger Erik Hurtado, who steered the ball into the net at point-blank range past Matt Turner.

On May 28, 2022, Gonzalez' poor clearance landed at the feet of Union forward Mikael Uhre who equalized in the 77th minute, nullifying Gustavo Bou's 75th-minute goal. Ultimately the match ended 1–1.

Gonzalez experienced a "mini-resurgence" during the 2023 season. He would score his first goal for the Revolution on September 16, 2023, in the 92nd minute of the Revolution's 2–1 loss to Colorado Rapids.

On November 25, 2025, Chicago Fire has appointed Gonzalez to be Chicago Fire II's assistant coach. In addition, he could play for the team as well.

== International career ==
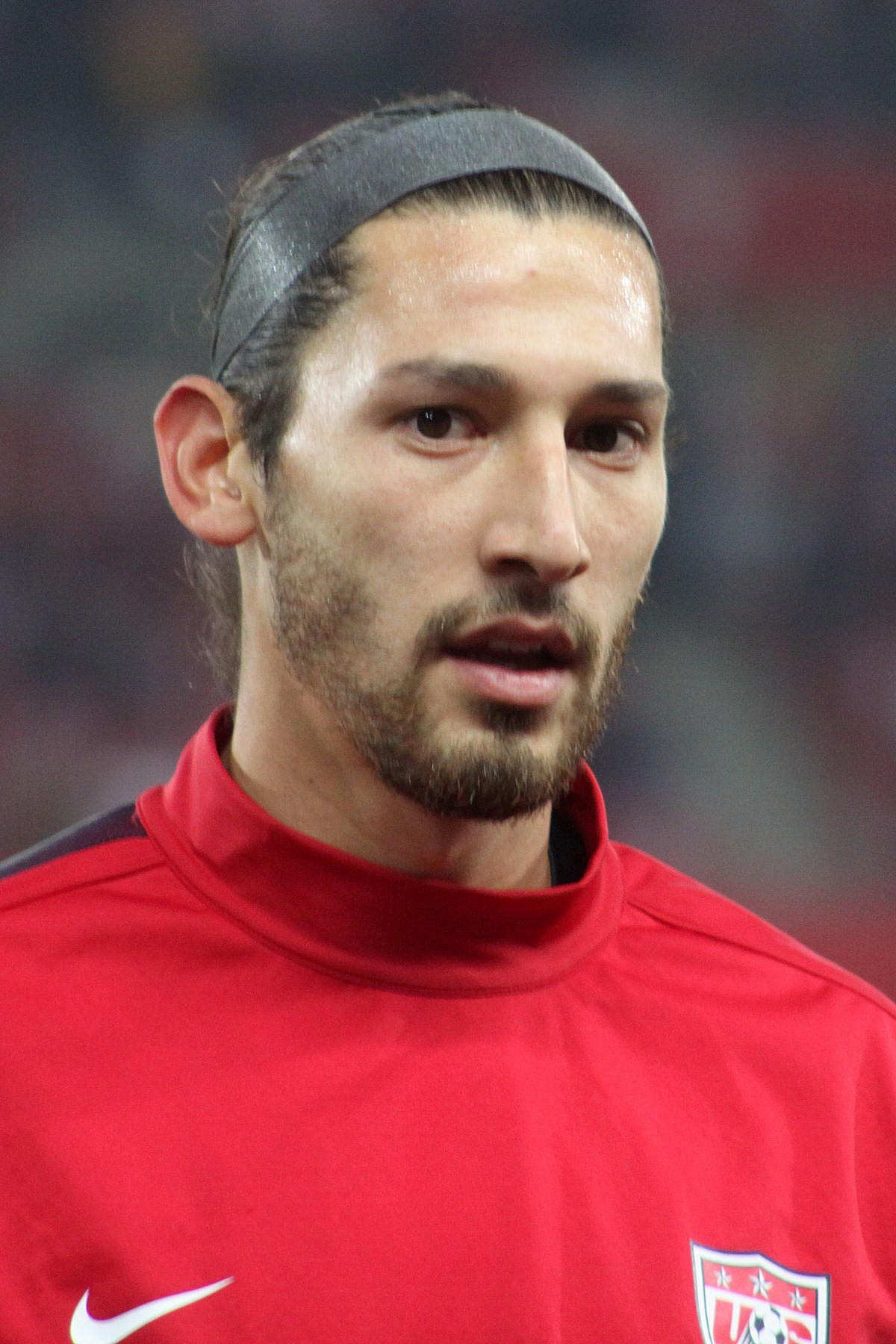
Gonzalez with the United States in 2013.

On August 10, 2010, Gonzalez made his senior team debut for the United States in a friendly against Brazil.

On March 26, 2013, Gonzalez was given the start in central defense in the United States' 0–0 draw in a World Cup qualifier against Mexico at Estadio Azteca in Mexico City. According to Jeff Carlisle of ESPN, Gonzalez "was the man of the match by a clear margin".

Gonzalez was included on Jurgen Klinsmann's 23-man roster for the 2014 World Cup. He started in the final group match against Germany, and the round of 16 match versus Belgium.

On October 10, 2017, Gonzalez scored an own goal in the final game of the 2018 World Cup qualifiers against Trinidad and Tobago which resulted in a 2–1 loss which prevented the United States from qualifying for the 2018 World Cup.

Gonzalez would make his final appearance for the national team in a quarterfinal game in the 2019 Gold Cup against Curaçao.

== Personal life ==
Born in the United States, Gonzalez is of Mexican descent.

== Career statistics ==
=== Club ===
As of match played September 6, 2025

Appearances and goals by club, season and competition
Club	Season	League			Playoffs		National cup		Continental		Other		Total	
Club	Season	Division	Apps	Goals	Apps	Goals	Apps	Goals	Apps	Goals	Apps	Goals	Apps	Goals
LA Galaxy	2009	Major League Soccer	30	1	4	0	–		–		–		34	1
LA Galaxy	2010	Major League Soccer	28	2	3	1	1	0	1	0	–		33	3
LA Galaxy	2011	Major League Soccer	29	2	4	0	1	1	6	1	–		40	4
LA Galaxy	2012	Major League Soccer	14	1	6	1	–		1	0	–		21	2
LA Galaxy	2013	Major League Soccer	27	1	2	0	–		5	1	–		34	2
LA Galaxy	2014	Major League Soccer	22	4	5	0	–		2	0	–		29	4
LA Galaxy	2015	Major League Soccer	30	1	1	0	1	0	–		–		32	1
LA Galaxy	Total		180	12	25	2	3	1	15	2	–		223	17
Pachuca	2015–16	Liga MX	16	1	6	0	–		–		1	0	23	1
Pachuca	2016–17	Liga MX	29	0	2	0	–		9	0	–		40	0
Pachuca	2017–18	Liga MX	14	0	–		8	2	–		3	0	25	2
Pachuca	Total		59	1	8	0	8	2	9	0	4	0	88	3
Atlas (loan)	2018–19	Liga MX	28	2	–		8	0	–		–		36	2
Toronto FC	2019	Major League Soccer	14	1	1	0	1	0	–		–		16	1
Toronto FC	2020	Major League Soccer	23	0	1	0	–		–		1	0	25	0
Toronto FC	2021	Major League Soccer	27	3	–		1	0	4	0	–		32	3
Toronto FC	Total		64	4	2	0	2	0	4	0	1	0	73	4
New England Revolution	2022	Major League Soccer	17	0	–		1	0	2	0	–		20	0
New England Revolution	2023	Major League Soccer	15	1	–		2	0	–		–		17	1
New England Revolution	Total		32	1	–		3	0	2	0	–		37	1
FC Dallas	2024	Major League Soccer	15	0	–		1	0	–		1	0	17	0
Chicago Fire	2025	Major League Soccer	12	0	0	0	3	0	–		–		15	0
Career total			390	20	35	2	29	3	29	2	6	0	489	27

=== International ===
As of match played June 30, 2019. Scores and results list the United States's goal tally first.

No.	Date	Venue	Opponent	Score	Result	Competition	Ref.
1.	July 18, 2015	M&T Bank Stadium, Baltimore, United States	Cuba	4–0	6–0	2015 CONCACAF Gold Cup	
2.	July 12, 2017	Raymond James Stadium, Tampa, United States	Martinique	1–0	3–2	2017 CONCACAF Gold Cup	
3.	July 19, 2017	Lincoln Financial Field, Philadelphia, United States	El Salvador	1–0	2–0	2017 CONCACAF Gold Cup	

== Honors ==
University of Maryland

- NCAA Men's Division I Soccer Championship: 2008

LA Galaxy

- MLS Cup: 2011, 2012, 2014
- Supporters' Shield: 2010, 2011

Pachuca

- Liga MX: Clausura 2016
- CONCACAF Champions League: 2016–17

United States

- CONCACAF Gold Cup: 2013, 2017

Individual

- MLS Rookie of the Year: 2009
- MLS Defender of the Year: 2011
- MLS Best XI: 2010, 2011, 2013, 2014
- MLS Cup MVP: 2012
- CONCACAF Gold Cup Best XI: 2017
