= Juninho (footballer, born January 1989) =

Brazilian footballer

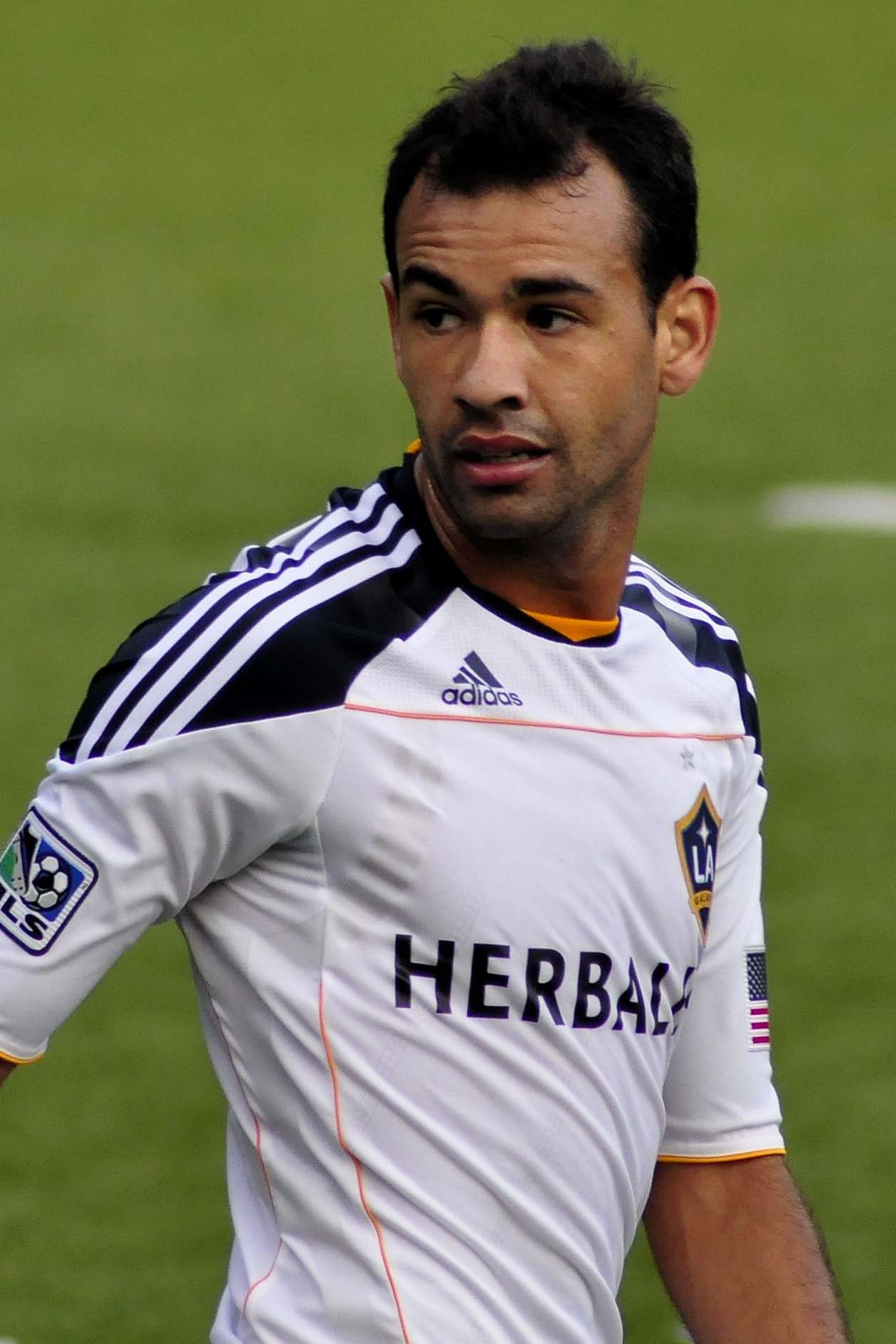
- Juninho with LA Galaxy in 2011

Personal information
- Full name: Vitor Gomes Pereira Junior
- Date of birth: 8 January 1989 (age 37)
- Place of birth: São José dos Campos, Brazil
- Height: 5 ft 7 in (1.70 m)
- Position: Central midfielder

Team information
- Current team: LA Galaxy (U19 manager)

Youth career
- 2004–2008: São Paulo

Senior career*
Years	Team	Apps	(Gls)
2008–2013	São Paulo	0	(0)
2009	→ Toledo (loan)	10	(2)
2010–2012	→ LA Galaxy (loan)	87	(13)
2013–2015	LA Galaxy	100	(5)
2016–2019	Tijuana	20	(1)
2017	→ Chicago Fire (loan)	21	(1)
2019	LA Galaxy	2	(0)
2019	LA Galaxy II	2	(0)
Total		242	(22)

Managerial career
- 2020–: LA Galaxy (academy coach)
- * Club domestic league appearances and goals

Vítor Gomes Pereira Júnior (born 8 January 1989), is a Brazilian former professional footballer who played as a midfielder, who is currently the head coach of the LA Galaxy Academy U-19 team playing in the United Premier Soccer League. He is commonly known as Juninho or Vitor Junior, and is the older brother of footballer Ricardo Goulart.

== Career ==
Juninho grew up in the city of São Paulo and played for the São Paulo youth team, winning the U-17 Paulista Championship side in 2006. He made one appearance for the São Paulo senior side in 2007. He was sent out on loan to Major League Soccer team Los Angeles Galaxy in 2010 along with fellow Brazilians from the club Alex Cazumba and Leonardo. He made his debut for the team on 27 March 2010, in Galaxy's opening game of the 2010 MLS season against New England Revolution, and scored his first goal for the Galaxy in a 2-0 win over AC St. Louis in the 2010 U.S. Open Cup Round of 16 game on 29 June 2010. Juninho scored his first goal in a league game against Seattle Sounders FC on 4 July 2010, shooting from over 30 yards out. The goal was named the Goal of the Week for week 13.

Juninho helped Galaxy win the Supporters' Shield in both 2010 and 2011. He was also a key player in the Galaxy's 2011 MLS Cup championship and played the full 90 minutes in the final victory over the Houston Dynamo. At the conclusion of the 2011 MLS season, Juninho left Los Angeles and signed a three-year contract with boyhood club São Paulo. However, in February 2012 Juninho returned to Los Angeles on loan for the 2012 MLS season.

Juninho eventually made his stay at Los Angeles a permanent one when he signed with the club in January 2013 following his release from São Paulo. In his six seasons with LA Galaxy, Juninho made 180 starts and 187 regular season appearances, recording 18 goals and 23 assists along the way. He also recorded an additional 21 appearances, one goal and four assists in postseason play, including scoring the decisive goal in the 2014 Wester Conference Final to send the Galaxy to the MLS Cup.

In December 2015, Juninho was sold to Tijuana of Liga MX, where he signed a three-year deal.

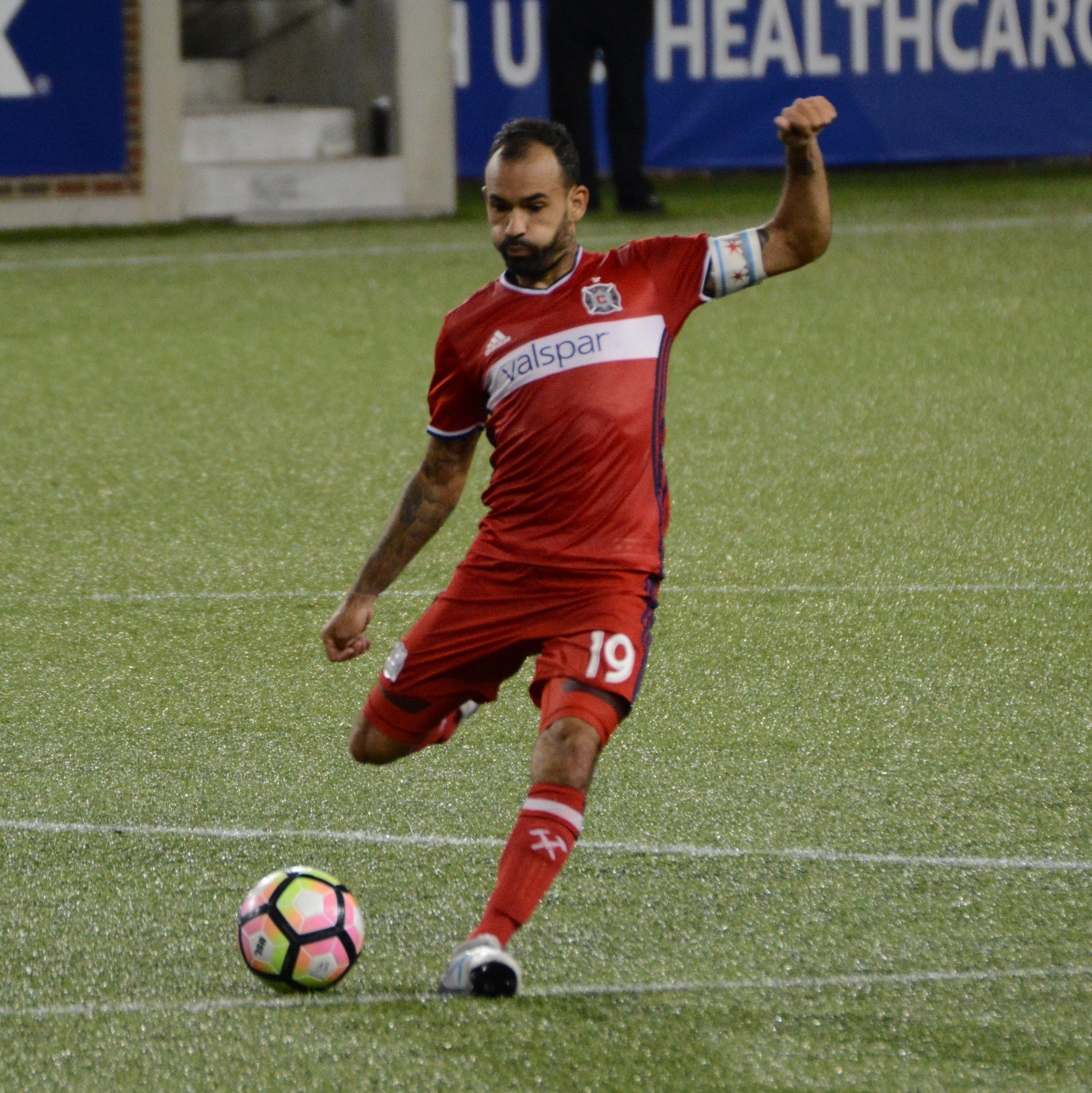
Juninho playing for Chicago Fire in 2017

In December 2016, Juninho was loaned from Tijuana to Chicago Fire of Major League Soccer. This loan ended following the conclusion of the 2017 season.

On 18 December 2018, Juninho returned to LA Galaxy for a third stint, after acquiring the Right of First Refusal from the Chicago Fire in exchange for $75,000 in General Allocation Money.

On 30 June 2020, Juninho announced his retirement from playing professional football.

=== Coaching ===
After retiring, Juninho was hired as a academy coach at LA Galaxy. Juninho was named head coach of the LA Galaxy Academy U-19 squad ahead of their first season playing in the United Premier Soccer League. He had previously coached the Galaxy U-14 team before joining Marcelo Sarvas in coaching the Galaxy U-17s.

== Personal life ==
Juninho holds a U.S. green card which qualified him as a domestic player in MLS. Juninho's brother Ricardo Goulart is also a former footballer best known for playing with former Chinese Super League champion Guangzhou Evergrande, he came back to Brazil playing for Santos FC and Esporte Clube Bahia, before retiring in 2023.

== Honours ==
=== Club ===
São Paulo Reserves

- U-17 Paulista Championship: 2006

Los Angeles Galaxy

- MLS Cup (3): 2011, 2012, 2014
- Supporters' Shield (2): 2010, 2011

Individual

- MLS All-Star: 2011, 2015
