= Todd Dunivant =

American soccer executive and former player

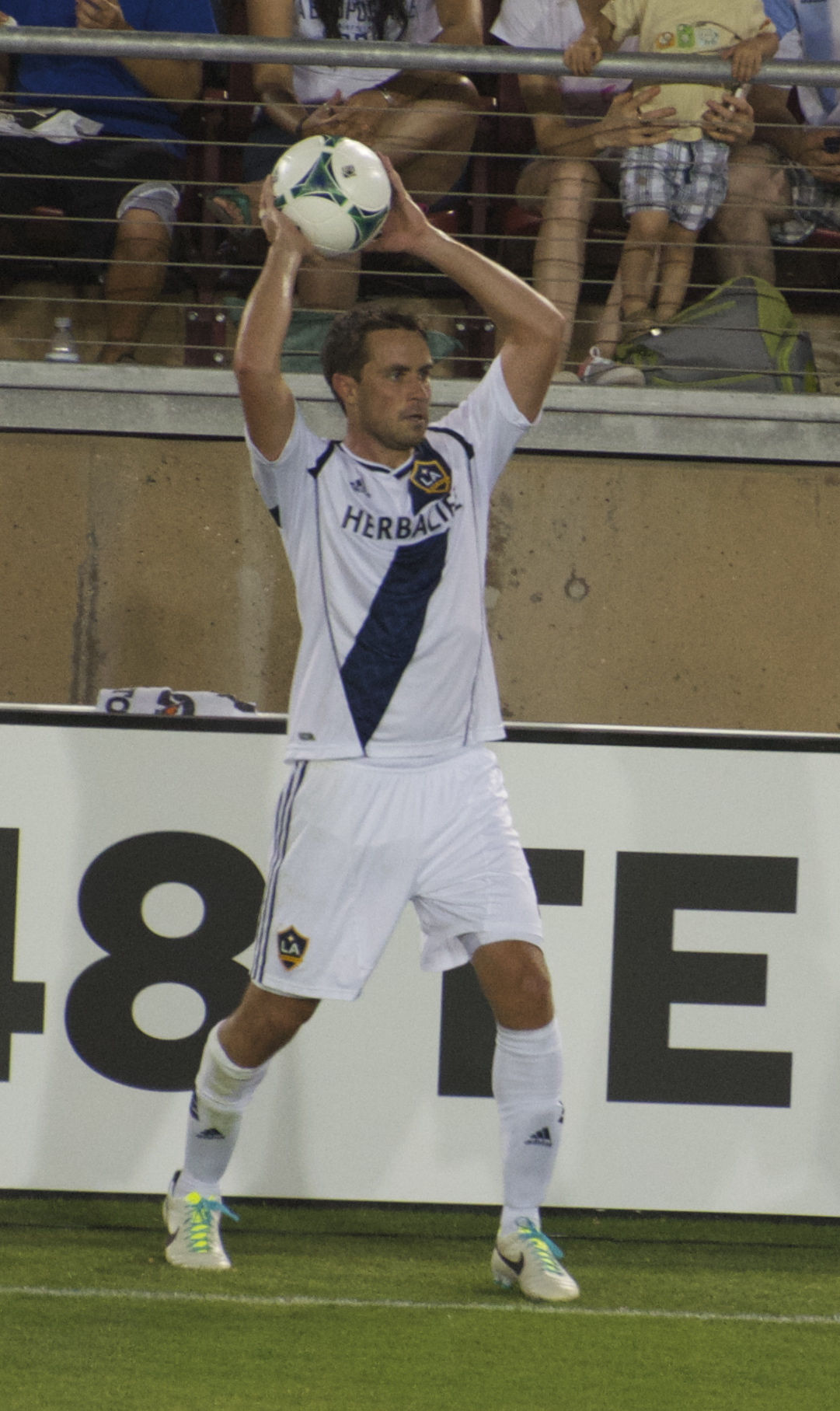

Personal information
- Full name: Todd Dunivant
- Date of birth: December 26, 1980 (age 45)
- Place of birth: Wheat Ridge, Colorado, United States
- Height: 6 ft 0 in (1.83 m)
- Position: Defender

Team information
- Current team: New York City FC (sporting director)

College career
Years	Team	Apps	(Gls)
1999–2002	Stanford Cardinal		

Senior career*
Years	Team	Apps	(Gls)
2002	Boulder Rapids Reserve		
2003–2004	San Jose Earthquakes	46	(1)
2005–2006	LA Galaxy	45	(0)
2006–2007	New York Red Bulls	16	(2)
2007–2008	Toronto FC	27	(0)
2009–2015	LA Galaxy	148	(4)
Total		284	(7)

International career^{‡}
2006	United States	2	(0)
- * Club domestic league appearances and goals as of August 24, 2015 ‡ National team caps and goals as of October 19, 2011

Todd Dunivant (born December 26, 1980) is an American soccer executive and former defender who played 13 years in Major League Soccer winning 5 MLS Cup trophies. After retirement he spearheaded the San Francisco Deltas professional soccer team as the Director of Soccer Operations and Business Development, winning the NASL Championship in its expansion season. He served as the president and general manager of Sacramento Republic FC from 2018 to 2025, leading the team to the 2022 U.S. Open Cup Final. Beginning in 2026, Dunivant will be the new sporting director of Major League Soccer side New York City FC.

== Playing career ==
=== College and amateur ===
In high school, Dunivant won two Colorado state championships in 1997 and 1998 at Dakota Ridge High School. Dunivant was also an exemplary student, being Valedictorian for his class of 1999. Dunivant played college soccer at Stanford University from 1999 to 2002. Dunivant appeared in 81 Games at Stanford and was the only player in the nation to be both First Team All-American and First Team Academic All-American in 2002. He led the Cardinal to back to back Final Fours in 2001 and 2002. He graduated with a Bachelor of Arts in economics in 3.33 years.

=== Club tenure ===
Dunivant was the first college senior taken in the 2003 MLS SuperDraft and was selected sixth overall by the San Jose Earthquakes. Dunivant started all thirty of the team's games that year, while scoring one goal and six assists, as the Quakes won its second MLS Cup. He was traded to Los Angeles Galaxy in 2005 in a four-player deal and played every minute for the Galaxy, as they won the MLS Cup and U.S. Open Cup double.^{[1]} Dunivant was eventually traded to the New York Red Bulls, where he made twenty-two appearances during the 2006–07 seasons.

Dunivant was acquired by expansion side Toronto FC on June 27, 2007, in a trade for Kevin Goldthwaite. Dunivant played 18 games for Toronto in his first season, all of them starts. Dunivant was traded back to the Los Angeles Galaxy on February 3, 2009, in exchange for allocation money. He spent seven more seasons with the Galaxy, collecting 3 more MLS Cups (2011, 2012, 2014), 2 supporter shields (2010, 2011).

Dunivant retired from soccer at the end of the 2015 MLS season with 25 MLS Playoff appearances, 5 MLS Cup Championships (second most all-time), a 2011 Best XI Selection and a 4x Humanitarian of the Year Recipient.^{[2]} Those accomplishments suggest that Dunivant "was arguably the best left fullback in the league during his career - certainly one of the most consistent players in MLS."

==== International appearances ====
Dunivant got his first cap for the United States national team on January 29, 2006, against Norway where he recorded 2 assists. He then started in a 3–2 victory over Japan on February 11, 2006.

== Front office career ==
In 2011, prior to his retirement from playing, Dunivant was elected to the MLS Players Association executive board, where he served for five years.

Dunivant joined SF Deltas as director of soccer operations and business development for their sole season in the revived NASL. Despite off-the-field challenges, including poor attendance and a lack of experienced ownership, the team eventually won the 2017 NASL championship, in the club's sole year of existence, and the league's final one to date.

In 2018, Dunivant joined Sacramento Republic FC as general manager, in the USL Championship, and was promoted to president and g.m. in 2021. His tenure at Republic FC was marked by success, including regular playoff competition, groundbreaking on a new stadium, a conference championship in 2023, and the club's appearance in the 2022 U.S. Open Cup final.

Beginning in 2026, Dunivant will be the new sporting director of New York City FC.

== Honors ==
=== Club ===
LA Galaxy

- Major League Soccer MLS Cup: 2005, 2011, 2012, 2014
- Lamar Hunt U.S. Open Cup: 2005
- Major League Soccer Supporter's Shield: 2010, 2011
- Major League Soccer Western Conference Championship: 2005, 2009, 2011

San Jose Earthquakes

- Major League Soccer MLS Cup: 2003

=== Individual ===
- Major League Soccer MLS Best XI: 2011
