= 2011 Chicago Fire season =

Chicago Fire
2011 season
- Chairman: Andrew Hauptman
- Manager: Frank Klopas (interim)
- Stadium: Toyota Park (capacity: 20,000)
- MLS: 11th overall (6th in the Eastern Conference)
- MLS Playoffs: Did not qualify
- U.S. Open Cup: Runners-up
- Carolina Challenge Cup: Third place
- Brimstone Cup: Did not win
- Top goalscorer: Dominic Oduro (12)
- Highest home attendance: Regular season: 20,237 vs Columbus Crew (October 22, 2011); Other (Friendly): 18,224 vs C.D. Guadalajara (September 14, 2011); Other venue: 61,308 vs Manchester United at Soldier Field (July 23, 2011)
- Lowest home attendance: Regular season: 10,362 vs FC Dallas (October 12, 2011); Other (U.S. Open Cup): 8,909 vs Richmond Kickers (August 30, 2011)
- Average home league attendance: 14,273
- Biggest win: RSL 0-3 CHI (9/28)
- Biggest defeat: POR 4-2 CHI (4/14); VAN 4-2 CHI (8/7)
Home colors	Away colors

The 2011 Chicago Fire season was the club's 13th year of existence, as well as their 14th season in Major League Soccer and their 14th consecutive year in the top-flight of American soccer.

== Squad ==
As of September 14, 2011.

Note: Flags indicate national team as defined under FIFA eligibility rules; some limited exceptions apply. Players may hold more than one non-FIFA nationality.

No.	Pos.	Nation	Player
1	GK	USA	Jon Conway
3	DF	USA	Dan Gargan
4	DF	USA	Kwame Watson-Siriboe (on loan to FC Tampa Bay)
5	DF	USA	Cory Gibbs
6	DF	USA	Jalil Anibaba
7	MF	USA	Mike Banner
8	FW	GHA	Dominic Oduro
9	MF	BIH	Baggio Husidić
10	MF	ARG	Sebastián Grazzini
11	MF	USA	Daniel Paladini
12	MF	USA	Logan Pause (captain)
13	DF	CRC	Gonzalo Segares
14	FW	GHA	Patrick Nyarko
15	FW	ISR	Orr Barouch (on loan from Tigres UANL)
16	MF	GUA	Marco Pappa

No.	Pos.	Nation	Player
17	MF	MEX	Pável Pardo
19	MF	USA	Corben Bone
21	MF	USA	Michael Videira
23	DF	CRO	Josip Mikulić
24	DF	GRE	Pari Pantazopoulos
25	GK	USA	Sean Johnson
27	MF	USA	Victor Pineda
28	DF	USA	Steven Kinney
29	FW	COL	Cristian Nazarit
30	GK	USA	Alec Dufty
88	FW	USA	Gabriel Ferrari
89	DF	COL	Yamith Cuesta
94	FW	USA	Kellen Gulley
99	FW	URU	Diego Cháves

== Player movement ==
=== Transfers ===
==== In ====
Date	Player	Position	Previous club	Fee/notes	Ref
December 15, 2010	(United States) Cory Gibbs	DF	(United States) New England Revolution	Re-Entry Draft	
January 11, 2011	(United States) Daniel Paladini	MF	(United States) Carolina RailHawks	Free	
January 11, 2011	(Croatia) Josip Mikulić	DF	(Croatia) NK Zagreb	Undisclosed	
January 13, 2011	(United States) Jalil Anibaba	DF	(United States) University of North Carolina	SuperDraft, 1st round	
January 13, 2011	(United States) Jon Conway	GK	(Canada) Toronto FC	Acquired for 3rd round draft pick	
February 3, 2011	(Uruguay) Gastón Puerari	FW	(Uruguay) Montevideo Wanderers	Undisclosed	
February 18, 2011	(Uruguay) Diego Cháves	FW	(Uruguay) Nacional	Undisclosed	
March 1, 2011	(United States) Alec Dufty	GK	(United States) AC St. Louis	Free	
March 2, 2011	(Croatia) Marko Marić	MF	(Greece) Skoda Xanthi	Free	
March 10, 2011	(United States) Michael Videira	MF	(United States) AC St. Louis	Free	
March 17, 2011	(United States) Davis Paul	FW	(United States) University of California, Berkeley	SuperDraft, 3rd round	
March 23, 2011	(Colombia) Yamith Cuesta	DF	(United States) Chivas USA	Acquired for a 2012 Supplemental Draft pick	
March 23, 2011	(Ghana) Dominic Oduro	FW	(United States) Houston Dynamo	Acquired for Calen Carr	
March 24, 2011	(United States) Gabriel Ferrari	FW	(Switzerland) FC Wohlen	Undisclosed	
April 4, 2011	(Greece) Pari Pantazopoulos	DF	(Greece) Zakynthos	Free	
May 4, 2011	(Colombia) Cristian Nazarit	FW	(Colombia) Independiente Santa Fe	Undisclosed	
July 13, 2011	(Argentina) Sebastián Grazzini	MF	(Argentina) Club Atlético All Boys	Undisclosed	
July 26, 2011	(Mexico) Pável Pardo	MF	(Mexico) Club América	Undisclosed	
July 28, 2011	(United States) Dan Gargan	DF	(Canada) Toronto FC	Acquired with a 2012 SuperDraft Round 2 pick for Dasan Robinson	
August 11, 2011	(United States) Kellen Gulley	FW	(United States) Chicago Fire Juniors Mississippi	Undisclosed; will not be added to first-team roster until 2012	

==== Out ====
Date	Player	Position	Destination club	Fee/notes	Ref
October 24, 2010	(United States) C.J. Brown	DF	None	Retired	
October 24, 2010	(United States) Brian McBride	FW	None	Retired	
November 24, 2010	(United States) Peter Lowry	MF	(United States) Portland Timbers	Expansion Draft	
November 24, 2010	(United States) John Thorrington	MF	(Canada) Vancouver Whitecaps FC	Expansion Draft	
November 24, 2010	(Netherlands) Collins John	FW	(Azerbaijan) Gabala FC	Released, free transfer	
November 24, 2010	(Poland) Krzysztof Król	DF	(Poland) Jagiellonia Białystok	Loan expired, returned to parent club	
December 31, 2010	(Colombia) Wilman Conde	DF	(Mexico) Atlas	Contract expired, free transfer	
December 31, 2010	(Sweden) Freddie Ljungberg	MF	(Scotland) Celtic F.C.	Contract expired, free transfer	
January 31, 2011	(United States) Andrew Dykstra	GK	(United States) Charleston Battery	Released, free transfer	
February 9, 2011	(El Salvador) Deris Umanzor	DF	(El Salvador) C.D. Águila	Released	
March 23, 2011	(United States) Calen Carr	FW	(United States) Houston Dynamo	Traded for Dominic Oduro	
June 15, 2011	(Uruguay) Gastón Puerari	FW	(Mexico) Atlas	Undisclosed	
June 29, 2011	(United States) Davis Paul	FW	(United States) Chicago Fire Premier	Released, free transfer	
July 26, 2011	(Serbia) Bratislav Ristić	MF		Released	
July 28, 2011	(United States) Dasan Robinson	DF	(Canada) Toronto FC	Traded for Dan Gargan and a 2012 SuperDraft Round 2 pick	
September 14, 2011	(Croatia) Marko Marić	MF		Waived	

=== Loans ===
==== In ====
Date	Player	Position	Loaned from	Fee/notes	Ref
March 10, 2011	(Israel) Orr Barouch	FW	(Mexico) Tigres UANL	One year loan	

==== Out ====
Date	Player	Position	Destination club	Fee/notes	Ref
June 2, 2011	(United States) Kwame Watson-Siriboe	DF	(United States) FC Tampa Bay	Through the end of 2011 season	

== League table ==
Pos	Team	Pld	W	L	T	GF	GA	GD	Pts	Qualification
1	LA Galaxy (S, C)	34	19	5	10	48	28	+20	67	CONCACAF Champions League
2	Seattle Sounders FC	34	18	7	9	56	37	+19	63	CONCACAF Champions League
3	Real Salt Lake	34	15	11	8	44	36	+8	53	CONCACAF Champions League
4	FC Dallas	34	15	12	7	42	39	+3	52	
5	Sporting Kansas City	34	13	9	12	50	40	+10	51	
6	Houston Dynamo	34	12	9	13	45	41	+4	49	CONCACAF Champions League
7	Colorado Rapids	34	12	9	13	44	41	+3	49	
8	Philadelphia Union	34	11	8	15	44	36	+8	48	
9	Columbus Crew	34	13	13	8	43	44	−1	47	
10	New York Red Bulls	34	10	8	16	50	44	+6	46	
11	Chicago Fire	34	9	9	16	46	45	+1	43	
12	Portland Timbers	34	11	14	9	40	48	−8	42	
13	D.C. United	34	9	13	12	49	52	−3	39	
14	San Jose Earthquakes	34	8	12	14	40	45	−5	38	
15	Chivas USA	34	8	14	12	41	43	−2	36	
16	Toronto FC	34	6	13	15	36	59	−23	33	CONCACAF Champions League
17	New England Revolution	34	5	16	13	38	58	−20	28	
18	Vancouver Whitecaps FC	34	6	18	10	35	55	−20	28	

Source: MLS
Rules for classification: 1) points; 2) head-to-head record; 3) goal difference; 4) number of goals scored
(C) Champions; (S) Supporters' Shield

=== Results summary ===
Overall								Home						Away					
Pld	Pts	W	L	T	GF	GA	GD	W	L	T	GF	GA	GD	W	L	T	GF	GA	GD
34	43	9	9	16	46	45	+1	6	3	8	24	19	+5	3	6	8	22	26	−4

Last updated: October 23, 2011
Source: MLSSoccer.com Standings
Pld = Matches played; Pts = Points; W = Matches won; T = Matches tied; L = Matches lost; GF = Goals for; GA = Goals against; GD = Goal difference

=== Results by round ===
Round	1	2	3	4	5	6	7	8	9	10	11	12	13	14	15	16	17	18	19	20	21	22	23	24	25	26	27	28	29	30	31	32	33	34
Stadium	A	H	A	A	H	H	A	H	A	A	H	H	A	A	A	H	H	A	A	H	H	A	A	H	H	H	A	H	H	A	A	H	A	H
Result	T	W	L	L	L	T	T	T	T	L	T	T	T	W	T	T	T	T	L	L	T	L	T	T	W	W	L	W	W	W	T	L	W	W
Position	9	4	9	14	17	16	16	14	16	17	16	17	17	15	15	15	15	15	15	16	16	16	16	15	15	14	15	14	13	13	13	13	12	11

Updated to match(es) played on October 23, 2011. Source: 2011 Major League Soccer season
A = Away; H = Home; W = Win; L = Loss; T = Tie

=== Match results ===
Win Tie Loss

=== Pre-season ===
Kickoff times are in CST.

February 23, 2011	Chicago	4–2	New York	Lockhart Stadium, Fort Lauderdale
morning	Orr Barouch (2 (pen.)), 30', 42', 90'	report	John Rooney 9'; Corey Hertzog 68' (pen.)	Attendance: closed door

February 23, 2011	Chicago	1–1	New York	Lockhart Stadium, Fort Lauderdale
afternoon	Marco Pappa 53'	report	Joel Lindpere 18'	Attendance: closed door

February 26, 2011	Chicago	0–1	Seattle	IMG Soccer Academy, Bradenton, FL
13:00	Cory Gibbs (yellow card) 28' (yellow-red card) 55'	report	unnamed trialist (yellow card) 55'; Miguel Montano (yellow card) 72'; Servando Carrasco 120'	Attendance: open to public, free entry

=== Carolina Challenge Cup ===
Kickoff times are in CST.

March 5, 2011	Toronto FC	0–1	Chicago	Blackbaud Stadium, Charleston
16:00	Joao Plata (yellow card) 31'; Nick LaBrocca (yellow card) 33'; Nick Soolsma (yellow card) 57'; Mikael Yourassowsky (yellow card) 67'	report	Marco Pappa 6'; Logan Pause (red card) 36'

March 9, 2011	Chicago	0–1	D.C. United	Blackbaud Stadium, Charleston
16:00	Diego Cháves (red card) 37'	report	Blake Brettschneider 10'; Charlie Davies (yellow card) 34'; Conor Shanosky (yellow card) 75'; Rodrigo Brasesco (yellow card) 90'

March 12, 2011	Charleston Battery	0–0	Chicago	Blackbaud Stadium, Charleston
18:15	Stephen Armstrong (red card) 31'; Mark Wiltse (red card) 34'	report	Daniel Paladini (yellow card) 31'; Michael Videira (yellow card) 32' (yellow-red card) 39'

=== Major League Soccer ===
Kickoff times are in CST.

March 19, 2011 1	FC Dallas	1–1	Chicago	Frisco, Texas
19:30	Rodriguez 19'; Gonçalves (yellow card) 35'; Hernández (yellow card) 36'; Shea (red card) 55'	report	Cháves 17'; Gibbs (yellow card) 30'; Videira (yellow card) 59'; Mikulić (yellow card) 71'; Segares (yellow card) 78'	Stadium: Pizza Hut Park; Attendance: 20,145; Referee: Terry Vaughn

March 26, 2011 2	Chicago	3–2	Kansas City	Bridgeview, Illinois
15:00	Cháves 34'; Puerari 40' (yellow card) 48'; Pappa 59'	report	Bravo (red card) 30'; Besler 51'; Arnaud (yellow card) 58'; Bunbury 72'; Diop (yellow card) 88'	Stadium: Toyota Park; Attendance: 12,157; Referee: Jasen Anno

April 9, 2011 3	Seattle Sounders FC	2–1	Chicago	Seattle, Washington
15:00	White 7'; Zakuani 25'; Riley (yellow card) 32'; Hurtado (yellow card) 47+'	report	Cháves 8'; Robinson (yellow card) 71'	Stadium: Qwest Field; Attendance: 36,223; Referee: Hilario Grajeda

April 14, 2011 4	Portland	4–2	Chicago	Portland, Oregon
22:00	Perlaza 29'; Wallace 37'; Alhassan (yellow card) 43'; Perlaza 47'; Hall (yellow card) 53'; Jewsbury (yellow card) 57'; Robinson 84' (o.g.)	report	Segares (yellow card) 16'; Gibbs (yellow card) 37'; Brunner 65' (o.g.); Pappa 80'; Anibaba (yellow card) 84'	Stadium: Jeld-Wen Field; Attendance: 18,627; Referee: Ricardo Salazar

April 17, 2011 5	Chicago	1–2	Los Angeles	Bridgeview, Illinois
15:00	Videira (yellow card) 10'; Oduro 89' (yellow card) 93+'	report	Magee (yellow card) 31'; Barrett 42'; Stephens (yellow card) 63'; Gonzalez 72'; Hejduk (yellow card) 73'	Stadium: Toyota Park; Attendance: 18,203; Referee: Niko Bratsis

April 23, 2011 6	Chicago	1–1	Houston	Bridgeview
19:30	Cháves 18'; Oduro (yellow card) 21'; Cháves (yellow card) 91+'	report	Boswell 83'; Palmer (yellow card) 95+'	Stadium: Toyota Park; Attendance: 12,473; Referee: Mark Geiger

April 30, 2011 7	Colorado	1–1	Chicago	Commerce City, Colorado
20:00	Marshall (yellow card) 26'; Moor (yellow card) 49+'; Akpan 50'	report	Pappa 43'; Segares (yellow card) 49'; Paladini (yellow card) 56'	Stadium: Dick's Sporting Goods Park; Attendance: 11,789; Referee: Jorge Gonzalez

May 7, 2011 8	Chicago	0–0	Vancouver	Bridgeview, Illinois
19:30	Mikulić (yellow card) 4'; Cháves (yellow card) 61'; Paladini (yellow card) 76'; Husidić (yellow card) 83'	report	Dunfield (yellow card) 25'; Chiumiento (yellow card) 61'	Stadium: Toyota Park; Attendance: 11,680; Referee: Andrew Chapin

May 14, 2011 9	Toronto FC	2–2	Chicago	Toronto
18:00	Plata 9'; Guzman (yellow card) 25'; Santos 47'	report	Segares (yellow card) 19'; Paladini (yellow card) 28'; Pappa 63'; Barouch 76'	Stadium: BMO Field; Attendance: 18,674; Referee: Elias Bazakos

May 21, 2011 10	Philadelphia	2–1	Chicago	Chester, Pennsylvania
19:00	Califf (yellow card) 41'; Harvey (yellow card) 54'; Farfan 64'; Ruiz 74'	report	Ristić (yellow card) 30'; Oduro (yellow card) 59' (goal) 68'; Paladini (yellow card) 72'; Puerari (yellow card) 92+'	Stadium: PPL Park; Attendance: 18,372; Referee: Hilario Grajeda

May 28, 2011 11	Chicago	2–2	San Jose	Bridgeview, Illinois
19:30	Oduro 57'; Gibbs 80' (yellow card) 81'	report	Corrales 47'; Wondolowski 74'	Stadium: Toyota Park; Attendance: 11,926; Referee: Abiodun Okulaja

June 4, 2011 12	Chicago	0–0	Seattle	Bridgeview, Illinois
19:30	Cháves (yellow card) 46+'	report	Fucito (yellow card) 33'; Wahl (yellow card) 36'	Stadium: Toyota Park; Attendance: 13,839; Referee: Terry Vaughn

June 9, 2011 13	Kansas City Wizards	0–0	Chicago	Kansas City, Kansas
21:00	Harrington (yellow card) 21'; Nielsen (red card) 67'; Collin (yellow card) 97+'	report	Puerari (yellow card) 37'; Nazarit (yellow card) 57'	Stadium: Livestrong Sporting Park; Attendance: 19,925; Referee: Michael Kennedy

June 12, 2011 14	Columbus	0–1	Chicago	Columbus, Ohio
15:00	Ekpo (yellow card) 40'; Meram (yellow card) 50'	report	Nyarko (yellow card) 53'; Nazarit 91+'	Stadium: Crew Stadium; Attendance: 13,498; Referee: Hilario Grajeda

June 18, 2011 15	New England	1–1	Chicago	Foxborough, Massachusetts
18:30	Oduro 32'; Nazarit (yellow card) 59'; Segares (yellow card) 66'; Oduro (yellow card) 77'; Paladini (yellow card) 90'	report	Lekić 48'; Joseph (yellow card) 78'	Stadium: Gillette Stadium; Attendance: 14,246; Referee: Silviu Petrescu

June 22, 2011 16	Chicago	0–0	Real Salt Lake	Bridgeview, Illinois
19:30	Gibbs (yellow card) 3'; Barouch (yellow card) 64'	report	Johnson (yellow card) 47+'; Russell (yellow card) 49'	Stadium: Toyota Park; Attendance: 14,972; Referee: Juan Guzman

June 26, 2011 17	Chicago	1–1	New York	Bridgeview, Illinois
13:00	Cuesta (yellow card) 14'; Paladini (yellow card) 37'; Nyarko (yellow card) 49'; Pappa 58'	report	Lindpere 40'; Tainio (yellow card) 91+'	Stadium: Toyota Park; Attendance: 16,961; Referee: Michael Kennedy

July 2, 2011 18	Chivas USA	1–1	Chicago	Carson, California
21:00	Oduro 26'; Pappa (yellow card) 55'	report	LaBrocca 46'; Lahoud (yellow card) 67'	Stadium: The Home Depot Center; Attendance: 15,152; Referee: Ricardo Salazar

July 9, 2011 19	Los Angeles	2–1	Chicago	Carson, California
21:30	Donovan 58'; Beckham 65'; Birchall (yellow card) 94+'	report	Nazarit 62'; Paladini (yellow card) 65'; Cháves (yellow card) 91+'; Mikulić (red card) 96+'	Stadium: The Home Depot Center; Attendance: 21,762; Referee: David Gantar

July 16, 2011 20	Chicago	0–1	Portland	Bridgeview, Illinois
19:30	Gibbs (yellow card) 30'; Cuesta (yellow card) 57' (yellow-red card) 63'; Nazarit (yellow card) 85'	report	Jewsbury 25' (pen.); Hall (yellow card) 45'; Marcelin (yellow card) 70'; Chara (yellow card) 78'	Stadium: Toyota Park; Attendance: 16,419; Referee: Elias Bazakos

August 3, 2011 21	Chicago	1–1	Philadelphia	Bridgeview, Illinois
20:00	Pardo 54'; Pause (yellow card) 85'	report	Paunović 34'; Carroll (yellow card) 35'	Stadium: Toyota Park; Attendance: 10,557; Referee: Michael Kennedy

August 7, 2011 22	Vancouver	4–2	Chicago	Vancouver, British Columbia
18:00	Hassli 1', 72'; Harvey (yellow card) 4'; Koffie 24'; Rochat (yellow card) 33'; Sanvezzo 48'	report	Oduro 23' (yellow card) 26'; Pappa (yellow card) 53'; Pause (yellow card) 71'; Barouch 80'	Stadium: Empire Field; Attendance: 18,714; Referee: Chris Penso

August 13, 2011 23	New York	2–2	Chicago	Harrison, New Jersey
18:30	Henry 9'; Lindpere 63' (yellow card) 64'	report	Oduro 16'; Grazzini 24' (yellow card) 25'	Stadium: Red Bull Arena; Attendance: 25,177; Referee: Jair Marrufo

August 18, 2011 24	Chicago	1–1	D.C. United	Bridgeview, Illinois
20:00	Grazzini 59'; Gargan (yellow card) 68'; Pause (yellow card) 83'; Cuesta (yellow card) 93+'	report	Simms (yellow card) 38'; Jakovic (yellow card) 70'; Wolff 73'	Stadium: Toyota Park; Attendance: 15,818; Referee: Ricardo Salazar

August 21, 2011 25	Chicago	2–0	Toronto FC	Bridgeview, Illinois
18:00	Oduro 16'; Gargan 69'	report	Borman (yellow card) 77'	Stadium: Toyota Park; Attendance: 12,020; Referee: Paul Ward

August 27, 2011 26	Chicago	2–0	Colorado	Bridgeview, Illinois
19:30	Oduro 17'; Gibbs 36'; Segares (yellow card) 61'	report	Moor (yellow card) 55'; Nyassi (yellow card) 67'; Mullan (yellow card) 74'	Stadium: Toyota Park; Attendance: 15,211; Referee: Juan Guzman

September 10, 2011 27	San Jose	2–0	Chicago	Santa Clara, California
21:30	Wondolowski 10'; Beitashour (yellow card) 19'; Corrales 69'; Dawkins (yellow card) 85'; Corrales (yellow card) 90'; Cronin (yellow card) 92+'	report	Husidić (yellow card) 35'; Gargan (yellow card) 57'	Stadium: Buck Shaw Stadium; Attendance: 10,525; Referee: Geoff Gamble

September 17, 2011 28	Chicago	3–2	Chivas USA	Bridgeview, Illinois
15:00	Gibbs 3'; Ángel 26' (o.g.); Gibbs (red card) 37'; Mikulić (yellow card) 73'; Oduro 85'	report	Lahoud (yellow card) 5'; Ángel 61'; LaBrocca 63'	Stadium: Toyota Park; Attendance: 15,246; Referee: Jorge Gonzalez

September 25, 2011 29	Chicago	3–2	New England	Bridgeview, Illinois
15:00	Grazzini 5' (pen.); Oduro 9'; Nyarko 30'; Gargan (yellow card) 76'; Husidić (yellow card) 86'	report	Coria (yellow card) 27'; Barnes (yellow card) 46+'; Guy 90', 92+'	Stadium: Toyota Park; Attendance: 14,576; Referee: Michael Kennedy

September 28, 2011 30	Real Salt Lake	0–3	Chicago	Sandy, Utah
20:00	Beckerman (red card) 11'; Espíndola (yellow card) 16'; Álvarez (yellow card) 56'	report	Pappa 9', 36', 75'; Gargan (yellow card) 16'	Stadium: Rio Tinto Stadium; Attendance: no data Referee: Baldomero Toledo

October 1, 2011 31	Houston	1–1	Chicago	Houston
15:00	Clark 33'	report	Oduro 43'; Segares (yellow card) 68'	Stadium: Robertson Stadium; Attendance: 17,544; Referee: Edvin Jurisevic

October 12, 2011 32	Chicago	1–2	FC Dallas	Bridgeview, Illinois
19:30	Segares (yellow card) 18'; Gargan (yellow card) 39'; Pardo (red card) 78'; Gibbs (yellow card) 82'; Grazzini 85'; Mikulić (yellow card) 90'	report	Loyd (yellow card) 29'; Gonçalves 41' (yellow card) 43'; Cruz 52' (yellow card) 58'	Stadium: Toyota Park; Attendance: 10,362; Referee: Michael Kennedy

October 15, 2011 33	D.C. United	1–2	Chicago	Washington, D.C.
18:30	Najar (yellow card) 76'; Rosario 90' (pen.)	report	Mikulic (yellow card) 46'; Barouch (yellow card) 78'; Grazzini 92+'; Cháves 94+'	Stadium: RFK Memorial Stadium; Attendance: 16,548; Referee: Terry Vaughn

October 22, 2011 34	Chicago	3–2	Columbus	Bridgeview, Illinois
19:30	Anibaba 11', 30'; Cháves 80'	report	Miranda (yellow card) 46+'; Rentería 73'; Duka (yellow card) 74' (goal) 79'; Ekpo (yellow card) 78' (yellow-red card) 90'	Stadium: Toyota Park; Attendance: 20,237; Referee: Hilario Grajeda

=== U.S. Open Cup ===
Kickoff times are in CST.

March 30, 2011 Qualification R2	Chicago	2–1	Colorado	Shea Stadium, Peoria
18:30	Puerari 45'; Anibaba 61'	report	46' Akpan	Attendance: 2,029

May 24, 2011 Qualification R3	San Jose	2–2 (a.e.t.) (4–5 p)	Chicago	Buck Shaw Stadium, Santa Clara
21:30	McLoughlin 14'; Wondolowski (yellow card) 37'; Morrow 43'; Ring (yellow card) 69'; Stephenson (yellow card) 97'	report	Cuesta (yellow card) 39'; Barouch 61'; Paladini (yellow card) 63'; Barouch (yellow card) 69'; Ristic (yellow card) 74'; Cuesta 76'; Nazarit (yellow card) 89'; Segares (red card) 98'	Attendance: 4,124; Referee: Daniel Radford
	Penalties
	Wondolowski (penalty scored); Cronin (penalty missed); Corrales (penalty scored); Stephenson (penalty scored); McDonald (penalty scored); Sealy (penalty missed)		(penalty scored) Pappa; (penalty missed) Pause; (penalty scored) Nazarit; (penalty scored) Barouch; (penalty scored) Oduro; (penalty scored) Paladini

June 28, 2011 USOC Round 3	Rochester	0–1	Chicago	Sahlen's Stadium, Rochester
18:30	Roberts (yellow card) 26'; Costanzo (yellow card) 87'; Motagalvan (yellow card) 90+'	report	Cháves 37'; Videira (yellow card) 72'; Nazarit (yellow card) 90+'	Attendance: 5,558; Referee: Daniel Fitzgerald

July 12, 2011 USOC Quarterfinal	Chicago	4–0	New York	Toyota Park, Bridgeview
17:00	Dominic Oduro 7'; Yamith Cuesta 48'; Orr Barouch 52', 69'; Orr Barouch (yellow card) 60'	report	Matt Kassel (yellow card) 85'; John Rooney (yellow card) 87'	Attendance: open gates Referee: Hilario Grajeda

August 30, 2011 USOC Semifinal	Chicago	2–1	Richmond Kickers	Toyota Park, Bridgeview
19:30	Sebastián Grazzini 32' (pen.); Dominic Oduro 61'	report	Stanley Nyazamba (yellow card) 14'; Yomby William 68'; Yomby William (yellow card) 77'	Attendance: 8,909; Referee: Jasen Anno

October 4, 2011 USOC Final	Seattle Sounders FC	2–0	Chicago	CenturyLink Field, Seattle
21:00	Fredy Montero 77'; Fredy Montero (yellow card) 90'; Osvaldo Alonso (yellow card) 90'; Osvaldo Alonso 96+'	report	Patrick Nyarko (yellow card) 27'; Daniel Paladini (yellow card) 39'; Jalil Anibaba (yellow card) 90'	Attendance: 35,615; Referee: Alex Prus

=== International friendlies ===
Kickoff times are in CST.

July 23, 2011	Chicago Fire (United States)	1–3	Manchester United (England)	Soldier Field, Chicago
16:00	Cory Gibbs 13'	report	Wayne Rooney 66'; Rafael 75'; Ryan Giggs (yellow card) 81'; Nani 82'	Attendance: 61,308; Referee: Terry Vaughn

September 14, 2011	Chicago Fire (United States)	0–1	C.D. Guadalajara (Mexico)	Toyota Park, Bridgeview
20:00	Yamith Cuesta (yellow card) 55'; Victor Pineda (yellow card) 81'	report	Jorge Mora 61'; Julio Nava (yellow card) 90+'	Attendance: 18,224; Referee: Michael Kennedy

== Recognition ==
=== Kits ===
Home	Away	Away Special

Type	Shirt	Shorts	Socks	First appearance / Info
Home	Red / White lettering	Red	Red	
Away	White / Navy lettering	White	White	
Away Special	White / Green lettering	White	Light green	MLS, April 23 against Houston

=== Leading scorers ===
Rank	Scorer	Goals	Assists
1	(Ghana) Dominic Oduro	12	2
2	(Guatemala) Marco Pappa	8	2
3	(Uruguay) Diego Cháves	6	1
4	(Argentina) Sebastián Grazzini	5	4
5	(United States) Cory Gibbs	3	1
6	(Israel) Orr Barouch	2	2
7	(United States) Jalil Anibaba	2	1
8	(Colombia) Cristian Nazarit	2	0
9	(Ghana) Patrick Nyarko	1	9
10	(Mexico) Pável Pardo	1	5
11	(Uruguay) Gastón Puerari	1	2
12	(United States) Dan Gargan	1	0
13	(Costa Rica) Gonzalo Segares	0	5
14	(Bosnia and Herzegovina) Baggio Husidic	0	2
15	(United States) Corben Bone	0	1
15	(United States) Daniel Paladini	0	1
15	(United States) Michael Videira	0	1

Last updated on October 23, 2011. Source: MLSsoccer.com Statistics - 2011 Chicago Fire

=== MLS Team of the Week ===
Week	Player	Position	Report
6	(Croatia) Josip Mikulić	DF	Report
6	(Uruguay) Diego Cháves	FW	Report
10	(Ghana) Dominic Oduro	MF	Report
12	(United States) Daniel Paladini	MF	Report
13	(Colombia) Yamith Cuesta	DF	Report
13	(United States) Frank Klopas	Coach	Report
16	(Ghana) Dominic Oduro	FW	Report
17	(Ghana) Patrick Nyarko	MF	Report
24	(Argentina) Sebastián Grazzini	MF	Report
24	(Ghana) Patrick Nyarko	MF	Report
24	(Ghana) Dominic Oduro	FW	Report
29	(Guatemala) Marco Pappa	MF	Report
31	(Costa Rica) Gonzalo Segares	DF	Report
32	(United States) Jalil Anibaba	DF	Report

=== MLS Player of the Week ===
Week	Player	Week's Statline
29	(Guatemala) Marco Pappa	3G (9', 36', 75')
32	(United States) Jalil Anibaba	2G

=== MLS All-Stars 2011 ===
Position	Player	Note
No Fire players were selected to the 2011 All-Star Team

== Miscellany ==
=== Allocation ranking ===
Chicago is in the #5 position in the MLS Allocation Ranking. The allocation ranking is the mechanism used to determine which MLS club has first priority to acquire a U.S. National Team player who signs with MLS after playing abroad, or a former MLS player who returns to the league after having gone to a club abroad for a transfer fee. Chicago traded allocation ranking positions with Seattle Sounders FC on August 26, 2011, with Seattle gaining the #4 position and Chicago receiving the #6 position.

=== International roster spots ===
Chicago has 8 international roster spots. Each club in Major League Soccer is allocated 8 international roster spots, which can be traded. There have been no reported trades involving Chicago international roster spots for the 2011 season. There is no limit on the number of international slots on each club's roster. The remaining roster slots must belong to domestic players. For clubs based in the United States, a domestic player is either a U.S. citizen, a permanent resident (green card holder) or the holder of other special status (e.g., refugee or asylum status).

=== Future draft pick trades ===
Acquired
Year	Draft	Round	Traded from	Ref.
2012	SuperDraft	Round 2	Toronto FC	
2012	SuperDraft	Round 3	Seattle Sounders FC	

Traded
Year	Draft	Round	Traded to	Ref.
2012	Supplemental	Not specified	Chivas USA	

=== MLS rights to other players ===
It is believed Chicago maintains the MLS rights to Carlos Bocanegra, Wilman Conde, Freddie Ljungberg, and Chris Rolfe as each of these players declined contract offers by the club and signed overseas on free transfers.
