= All-time Chicago Fire FC roster =

This list comprises all players who have participated in at least one league match for Chicago Fire FC since the team's first Major League Soccer season in 1998. Players who were on the roster but never played a first team game are not listed; players who appeared for the team in other competitions (U.S. Open Cup, CONCACAF Champions League, etc.) but never actually made an MLS appearance are noted at the bottom of the page.

A "†" denotes players who only appeared in a single match.

== A ==
- (Ghana) David Accam
- (Mexico) Alonso Aceves
- (Brazil) Adaílton
- (England) Mo Adams
- (Ghana) Junior Agogo †
- (Brazil) Alex
- (Argentina) Ignacio Aliseda
- (El Salvador) Arturo Álvarez
- (United States) Quincy Amarikwa
- (Ecuador) Juan Luis Anangonó
- (United States) Jalil Anibaba
- (Uruguay) Egidio Arévalo Ríos
- (United States) Chris Armas
- (Armenia) David Arshakyan
- (Uganda) Michael Azira

== B ==
- (United States) John Ball
- (United States) Mike Banner
- (Israel) Orr Barouch
- (United States) Chad Barrett
- (United States) Brian Bates
- (United States) DaMarcus Beasley
- (United States) Jamar Beasley
- (France) Pascal Bedrossian
- (Slovenia) Robert Berić
- (United States) Austin Berry
- (United States) Victor Bezerra
- (Mexico) Cuauhtémoc Blanco
- (United States) Carlos Bocanegra
- (Costa Rica) Jonathan Bolaños
- (United States) Corben Bone
- (Uganda) Tenywa Bonseu
- (United States) Jonathan Bornstein
- (Haiti) Alexandre Boucicaut
- (United States) Chris Brady
- (United States) Brandt Bronico
- (United States) C. J. Brown
- (United States) Scott Buete
- (United States) Kendall Burks
- (United States) Jon Busch

== C ==
- (Honduras) Samuel Caballero
- (United States) Joey Calistri
- (Costa Rica) Francisco Calvo
- (United States) Jonathan Campbell
- (Costa Rica) Diego Campos
- (Mexico) Jorge Campos
- (United States) Craig Capano
- (United States) Calen Carr
- (United States) Chris Carrieri †
- (United States) Javy Casas
- (Mexico) Nery Castillo
- (Uruguay) Diego Cháves
- (United States) Matt Chulis †
- (United States) Denny Clanton
- (United States) Greg Cochrane
- (Romania) Răzvan Cociș
- (New Zealand) Elliot Collier
- (Colombia) Wilman Conde
- (United States) Drew Conner
- (United States) Jon Conway
- (Cuba) Jorge Corrales
- (United States) Scott Coufal †
- (United States) D. J. Countess
- (Colombia) Yamith Cuesta
- (United States) Jeff Curtin
- (United States) Jim Curtin
- (Germany) Rafa Czichos

== D ==
- (Ukraine) Sergi Daniv
- (Netherlands) Michael de Leeuw
- (United States) Christian Dean
- (United States) Jonathan Dean
- (Bulgaria) Stefan Dimitrov
- (Brazil) Guly do Prado
- (United States) Patrick Doody
- (England) Paul Dougherty
- (Ivory Coast) Ousmane Doumbia
- (United States) Dilly Duka
- (United States) Andrew Dykstra

== E ==
- (Wales) Robert Earnshaw
- (Canada) Raheem Edwards
- (Ecuador) Jhon Espinoza
- (United States) Justin Evans

== F ==
- (Brazil) Rodrigo Faria
- (Uruguay) Álvaro Fernández
- (Peru) Collin Fernandez
- (United States) Gabriel Ferrari
- (United States) Matthew Fondy
- (Jamaica) Shaun Francis †
- (Mexico) Guillermo Franco
- (Poland) Przemysław Frankowski
- (Poland) Tomasz Frankowski
- (United States) Floyd Franks
- (Germany) Arne Friedrich
- (United States) Ryan Futagaki

== G ==
- (Argentina) Nicolás Gaitán
- (United States) Dan Gargan
- (United States) Eric Gehrig
- (United States) Sam George
- (Argentina) Gastón Giménez
- (Netherlands) John Goossens
- (United States) Cory Gibbs
- (Brazil) Gilberto
- (United States) Alan Gordon
- (United States) Kelly Gray
- (Argentina) Sebastián Grazzini
- (United States) Leonard Griffin
- (Honduras) Iván Guerrero
- (Mexico) Brian Gutiérrez
- (United States) Diego Gutiérrez
- (United States) Jeremiah Gutjahr

== H ==
- (Switzerland) Maren Haile-Selassie
- (United States) Michael Harrington
- (Liechtenstein) Nicolas Hasler
- (United States) David Hayes
- (Germany) Fabian Herbers
- (Costa Rica) Andy Herron
- (Colombia) Jhon Kennedy Hurtado
- (Bosnia and Herzegovina) Baggio Husidić

== I ==
- (United States) Patrick Ianni
- (Ghana) Sumed Ibrahim
- (United States) Zak Ibsen
- (Nigeria) Kennedy Igboananike
- (Bulgaria) Stanislav Ivanov

== J ==
- (United States) Chris Jahr
- (United States) Nate Jaqua
- (Netherlands) Collins John
- (United States) Will John
- (United States) Daniel Johnson
- (Jamaica) Jason Johnson
- (Jamaica) Ryan Johnson
- (United States) Sean Johnson
- (Canada) Will Johnson
- (Trinidad and Tobago) Joevin Jones
- (United States) Benji Joya
- (United States) Hunter Jumper

== K ==
- (Sierra Leone) Kei Kamara
- (Netherlands) Johan Kappelhof
- (Serbia) Aleksandar Katai
- (United States) Josh Keller
- (United States) Stephen King
- (United States) Steven Kinney
- (United States) Frank Klopas
- (Ukraine) Aleksey Korol †
- (Poland) Roman Kosecki
- (United States) Ritchie Kotschau
- (Greece) Georgios Koutsias
- (Ukraine) Dema Kovalenko
- (Poland) Krzysztof Król
- (United States) Kenneth Kronholm
- (Czech Republic) Luboš Kubík
- (United States) Tony Kuhn

== L ==
- (United States) Nick LaBrocca
- (United States) Manny Lagos
- (United States) Matt Lampson
- (United States) Jeff Larentowicz
- (United States) Andrew Lewis
- (United States) Grant Lillard
- (Estonia) Joel Lindpere
- (Sweden) Freddie Ljungberg
- (United States) Peter Lowry

== M ==
- (Netherlands) Sherjill MacDonald
- (United States) Amos Magee
- (United States) Mike Magee
- (United States) David Mahoney
- (Scotland) Shaun Maloney
- (United States) Justin Mapp
- (Brazil) Marcelo
- (Croatia) Marko Marić †
- (Paraguay) Líder Mármol
- (United States) Jesse Marsch
- (Panama) Cristian Martínez
- (El Salvador) Julio Martínez
- (United States) Brian McBride
- (United States) Dax McCarty
- (United States) Patrick McLain
- (Spain) Álvaro Medrán
- (Portugal) João Meira
- (Brazil) Bruno Menezes
- (United States) Djordje Mihailovic
- (Croatia) Josip Mikulić
- (United States) Alex Monis
- (Angola) Jerson Monteiro
- (United States) Jared Montz †
- (United States) Jason Moore
- (United States) Amando Moreno
- (United States) Alex Morrell
- (Armenia) Yura Movsisyan
- (United States) Chris Mueller

== N ==
- (Argentina) Federico Navarro
- (Venezuela) Miguel Navarro
- (Colombia) Cristian Nazarit
- (Hungary) Nemanja Nikolić
- (Poland) Piotr Nowak
- (United States) Mike Nugent
- (Ghana) Patrick Nyarko
- (The Gambia) Sanna Nyassi

== O ==
- (Ghana) Dominic Oduro
- (Nigeria) Chinonso Offor
- (Nigeria) Francis Okaroh
- (Brazil) William Oliveira
- (United States) Wyatt Omsberg
- (United States) Sergio Oregel Jr.
- (Denmark) David Ousted

== P ==
- (United States) Daniel Paladini
- (Jamaica) Lovel Palmer
- (Mexico) Pável Pardo
- (United States) Davis Paul †
- (United States) Logan Pause
- (United States) Orlando Perez
- (Spain) Víctor Pérez †
- (United States) Matt Pickens
- (United States) Mauricio Pineda
- (United States) Victor Pineda
- (United States) Brian Plotkin
- (Poland) Jerzy Podbrożny
- (United States) Matt Polster
- (United States) Brandon Prideaux
- (United States) Chad Prince
- (Poland) Kacper Przybyłko
- (Uruguay) Gastón Puerari
- (Uruguay) Federico Puppo

== R ==
- (Jamaica) Damani Ralph
- (Brazil) Rodrigo Ramos
- (United States) Ante Razov
- (Slovakia) Ľubomír Reiter
- (United States) Kyle Reynish
- (United States) Andre Reynolds II
- (United States) Michael Richardson †
- (United States) Spencer Richey
- (United States) Henry Ring
- (Serbia) Bratislav Ristić
- (United States) Chris Ritter
- (Colombia) Rafael Robayo
- (United States) Dasan Robinson
- (United States) Missael Rodríguez †
- (United States) Chris Rolfe
- (United States) Jordan Russolillo
- (Portugal) Rafael Ramos

== S ==
- (United States) Jorge Salcedo
- (Mexico) Richard Sánchez
- (United States) Tony Sanneh
- (Brazil) Maicon Santos
- (United States) C. J. Sapong
- (Germany) Bastian Schweinsteiger
- (Slovakia) Boris Sekulić
- (Costa Rica) Gonzalo Segares
- (Botswana) Dipsy Selolwane
- (Switzerland) Xherdan Shaqiri
- (United States) Harry Shipp
- (United States) Bobby Shuttleworth
- (France) Florent Sinama Pongolle
- (United States) Billy Sleeth
- (United States) Gabriel Slonina
- (United States) Chris Snitko
- (United States) Tom Soehn
- (Argentina) Luis Solignac
- (United States) Mike Sorber
- (Mali) Bakary Soumaré
- (France) Arnaud Souquet
- (United States) Curtis Spiteri †
- (United States) Dan Stebbins
- (United States) Michael Stephens
- (United States) Jack Stewart
- (Bulgaria) Hristo Stoichkov
- (Serbia) Luka Stojanović
- (Canada) Greg Sutton

== T ==
- (Trinidad and Tobago) Osei Telesford
- (Colombia) Carlos Terán
- (Brazil) Thiago
- (Senegal) Khaly Thiam
- (United States) Wells Thompson
- (United States) Zach Thornton
- (United States) John Thorrington
- (United States) Ryan Tinsley
- (Italy) Paolo Tornaghi
- (Mexico) Jairo Torres
- (Colombia) Johnny Torres

== U ==
- (El Salvador) Deris Umanzor

== V ==
- (United States) David Vaudreuil
- (United States) Michael Videira
- (United States) Brandon Vincent

== W ==
- (United States) Billy Walsh
- (Costa Rica) Paulo Wanchope
- (England) Grant Ward
- (United States) Tim Ward
- (United States) Austin Washington
- (England) Matt Watson
- (United States) Kwame Watson-Siriboe
- (United States) Evan Whitfield
- (Jamaica) Andy Williams
- (United States) Josh Wolff
- (United States) John Wolyniec
- (United States) Daniel Woolard
- (United States) Eric Wynalda

== Z ==
- (United States) Jeff Zaun †

== Miscellaneous ==
- (Bulgaria) Kalin Bankov never appeared in a league match but appeared in a 2001 U.S. Open Cup second round match.
- (United States) Nick Noble never appeared in a league match but appeared in a 2008 U.S. Open Cup third round match.
- (Greece) Pari Pantazopoulos never appeared in a league match but appeared in a 2011 U.S. Open Cup third round match.
- (United States) Miguel Saavedra never appeared in a league match but appeared in a CONCACAF Champions' Cup quarterfinal match.
- (United States) Tony Walls never appeared in a league match but appeared in a 2012 U.S. Open Cup third round match.

== Sources ==
- "MLS All-Time MLS Player Register". Mlsnet.com. Major League Soccer. Archived from the original on 14 February 2009.
- "MLS Number Assignments Archive".
- "TrueCar Chicago Fire Player Registry".
