= 2011 U.S. Open Cup final =

2011 final of the Lamar Hunt U.S. Open Cup

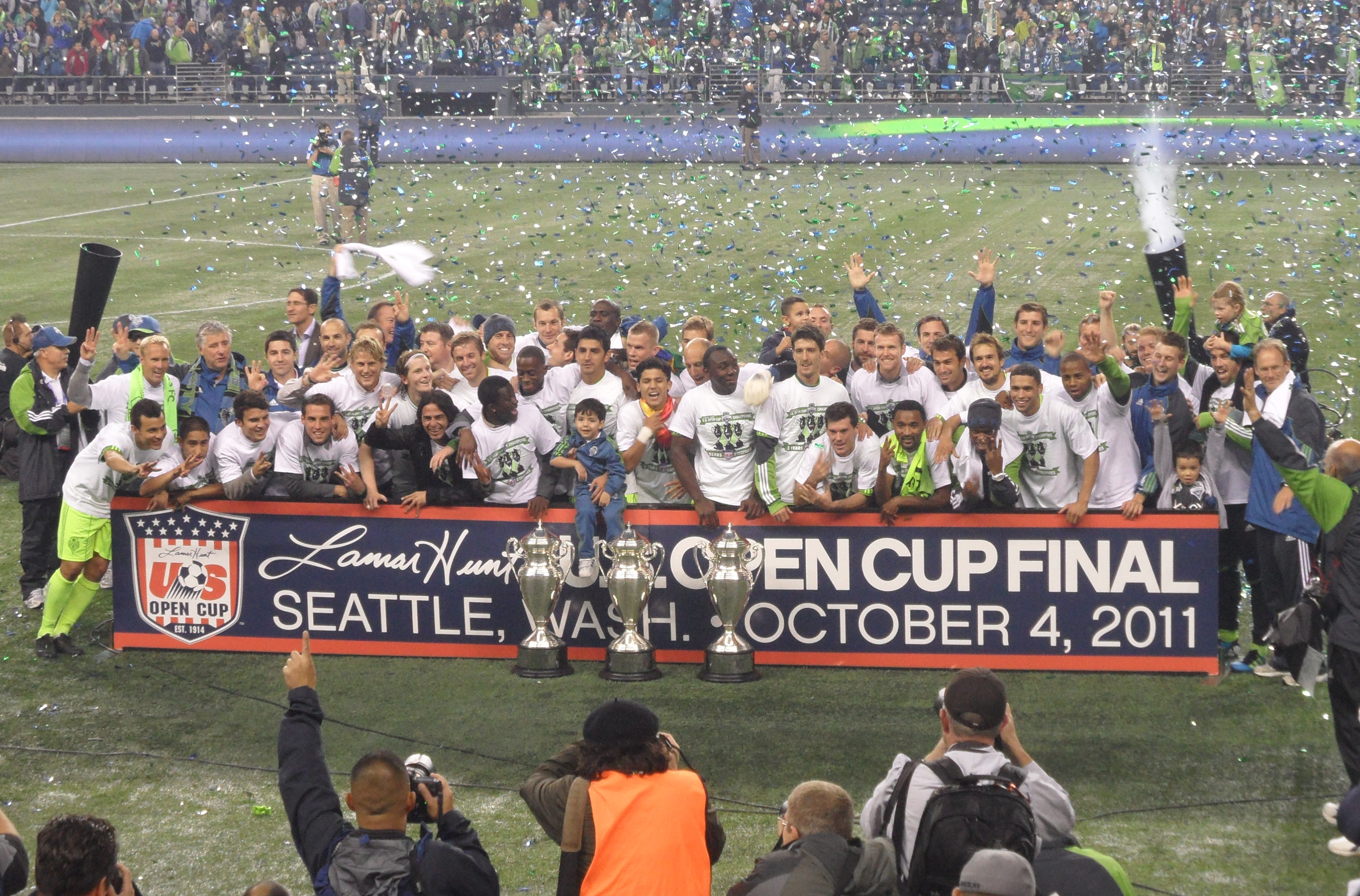
- Sounders FC players with the 2009, 2010 and 2011 U.S. Open Cup trophies after winning the 2011 final
- Event: 2011 U.S. Open Cup
Seattle Sounders FC	Chicago Fire
MLS	MLS
2	0
- Date: October 4, 2011
- Venue: CenturyLink Field, Seattle, Washington
- Man of the Match: Osvaldo Alonso
- Referee: Alex Prus (South Carolina)
- Attendance: 35,615
- Weather: 60 degrees; cool, crisp, light drizzle

The 2011 Lamar Hunt U.S. Open Cup final was a soccer match between the Seattle Sounders FC and the Chicago Fire, played on October 4, 2011, at CenturyLink Field in Seattle, Washington. The match was the culmination of the 2011 U.S. Open Cup, a tournament open to amateur and professional soccer teams affiliated with the United States Soccer Federation (U.S. Soccer). This was the 98th edition of the U.S. Open Cup, the oldest ongoing competition in American soccer. The Seattle Sounders FC won by defeating the Chicago Fire 2–0 with goals scored by Fredy Montero and Osvaldo Alonso. The attendance was 36,615, breaking the record for the final set the previous year when Seattle also won and hosted. Seattle became the first team since 1968 to win three consecutive U.S. Open Cup championships and the fourth team ever to do so in the 98-year history of the tournament.

Sounders FC automatically qualified for the third round of the U.S. Open Cup tournament by finishing among the top six in the 2010 Major League Soccer season. The Fire did not automatically qualify, and had to play through two qualification rounds before entering the official tournament. Prior to the final, Chicago and Seattle had met twice in 2011, with Seattle winning one game and the other ending in a draw.

The final was televised live on Fox Soccer. This was the second consecutive year the tournament final was played at CenturyLink Field. As the winner of the tournament, Seattle earned a berth in the 2012–13 CONCACAF Champions League and received a $100,000 cash prize. Chicago received a $50,000 prize as the runner-up. Following the final, criticism was raised regarding Seattle winning hosting rights for each round they played. In response, U.S. Soccer announced changes to the rules for determining the host of tournament matches.

== Road to the final ==
The U.S. Open Cup is an annual American soccer competition open to all U.S. Soccer affiliated teams, from amateur adult club teams to the professional clubs of Major League Soccer (MLS). The 2011 tournament was the 98th edition of the oldest soccer tournament in the United States.

The MLS, which has teams that play in both the United States and Canada, was allowed to enter eight of its fifteen U.S.-based teams in the tournament. The top six MLS teams from the previous season's league standings qualified automatically for the tournament, while the remaining two spots were determined by preliminary qualification matches. The eight MLS entries began play in the third round of the tournament. In 2010, Seattle Sounders FC finished among the top six in the MLS overall league standings to qualify for the third round of the 2011 U.S. Open Cup. The Chicago Fire however, did not and therefore had to play a series of qualification matches against fellow MLS teams that finished outside of the top six to qualify for the Open Cup tournament.

=== Chicago Fire ===
We've talked about the success and meaning of the tournament recently. That success started long before I was here. Winning the double in 1998, then winning again in 2000. My first year was 2003 when we won it and I was here in 2006. It's been a tournament this club has put a lot of effort, energy and money into being successful in.

— Logan Pause, Chicago Fire captain

Prior to reaching the 2011 final, the Chicago Fire had reached the U.S. Open Cup final five times in their 14-year history, the most of any MLS franchise, winning four out of five of the tournaments–most recently in 2006. The Fire began their 2011 Open Cup campaign on March 30, 2011, in the MLS qualification semifinals, hosting the Colorado Rapids at Shea Stadium in Peoria, Illinois. Chicago scored first with a goal from Gastón Puerari right before half time. Just one minute into the second half, the Rapids equalized with a goal from Andre Akpan. Following Akpan's goal, the match remained tied for 15 minutes until Chicago's Jalil Anibaba scored the match-winning goal in the 61st minute of play. Chicago moved on to the next round of qualification with a final score of 2–1.

The Fire then turned their attention to their second and final qualification match hosted by the San Jose Earthquakes at Buck Shaw Stadium in Santa Clara, California. Played on May 24, 2011, in front of 4,124 spectators, the hosts took a two-goal lead in the first half with Ellis McLoughlin and Justin Morrow scoring in the 14th and 43rd minutes, respectively. The Fire halved the deficit in the 61st minute with a goal from Orr Barouch. Fifteen minutes later the Fire tied the score with a strike from Yamith Cuesta. The score remained tied until the end of regulation, leading to extra time, during which Chicago's Gonzalo Segares was ejected for dissent. Despite the Earthquakes' man advantage, the two sides remained tied during overtime, prompting a penalty shootout. In the fifth round of penalties, with Chicago leading 5–4, San Jose's Scott Sealy missed his shot as it deflected off the crossbar, giving the Fire a second qualifier victory and a berth into the third round of the 2011 U.S. Open Cup tournament.

In the third round, Chicago faced the Rochester Rhinos of the USL Pro division. Rochester hosted the match on June 28 at the Rhinos' Sahlen's Stadium in front of a crowd of 5,558. The Fire's Diego Cháves netted the match's only goal in the 37th minute of play, earning the Fire a spot in the quarterfinals for the first time since 2008.

In the quarterfinals, held on July 12, 2011, the Fire hosted MLS Eastern Conference rival the New York Red Bulls at Toyota Park in Bridgeview, Illinois. Against mostly reserves for New York, the Fire won the match 4–0 with two goals from Orr Barouch and a goal each scored by Dominic Oduro and Yamith Cuesta. Due to power outages in the area following a severe thunderstorm, the game's start time was moved up from 7:30 pm to 5:00 pm local time, resulting in a late-arriving attendance of about 2,000. Following the match, uproar from Red Bull fans prompted coach Hans Backe to explain that fatigue was the reason for sending only his team's reserve players and an assistant coach to Chicago. New York had lost to DC United in league play just 2 days earlier.

On August 31, 2011, the Fire played host to another USL Pro side, the Richmond Kickers, in the semifinal round. On their way to the semifinals, the Kickers defeated two MLS teams in consecutive rounds. They upset the Columbus Crew and Sporting Kansas City in the third round and the quarterfinals, respectively. The semifinal was hosted by the Fire at Toyota Park in front of a crowd of 8,909. In the 32nd minute, the Fire took the lead with a goal from Sebastián Grazzini. In the 61st minute, Chicago went up 2–0 with a goal from Dominic Oduro. Seven minutes later, the Kickers cut the lead in half with a goal from Yomby William. The Fire won 2–1, earning their sixth trip to the U.S. Open Cup final.

=== Seattle Sounders FC ===
We want to accomplish something that no MLS team has done by winning three in a row. Any time we can make an achievement that sets us apart, it's important to our club.

— Sigi Schmid, Seattle Sounders FC head coach

In 2009, Seattle Sounders FC became the second MLS expansion club to win the U.S. Open Cup tournament, after the Chicago Fire in 1998. They defended their title in 2010 to win a second straight championship. Prior to the final, Sounders FC played U.S. Open Cup home games at the Starfire Sports Complex in Tukwila, Washington. The facility is smaller than the club's home stadium for league matches, CenturyLink Field, but Sounders FC representatives preferred the atmosphere at Starfire for smaller cup matches.

Sounders FC began the defense of their title on June 28, 2011, when they hosted the Kitsap Pumas of the USL Premier Development League from Bremerton, Washington. The match was played at Starfire in front of 3,811 fans. Seattle took the lead in the 39th minute when Michael Fucito scored off a headed pass from Nate Jaqua. Early in the second half Fucito doubled the lead by taking a pass from Mike Seamon and shooting past several defenders for the goal. Kitsap attempted their comeback in the 71st minute when Nikolas Besagno scored from a crossing pass from Robert Christner. In the 83rd minute, Kitsap forward Warlen Silva nearly equalized on a breakaway run, but his shot went into the side netting. Seattle was able to hold on for the 2–1 victory.

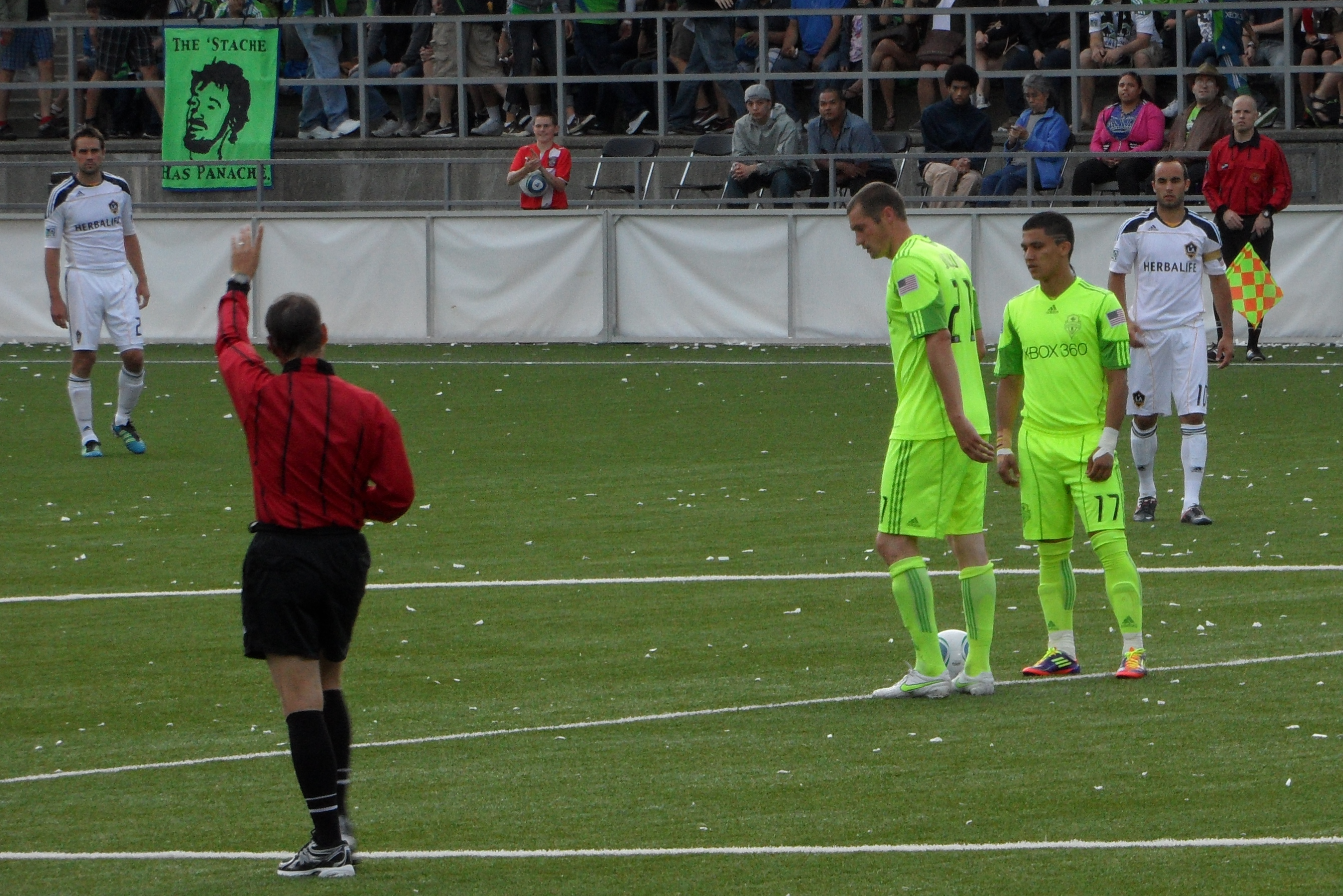
Seattle's second half kickoff vs. the LA Galaxy at Starfire.

Seattle then hosted their quarterfinal match on July 13 against a fellow MLS side, the Los Angeles Galaxy. The match was again held at Starfire, with an attendance of 4,322. Nate Jaqua scored following a pass from Pat Noonan in the 4th minute. In the 25th minute, Fredy Montero scored with a left-footed shot from an assist from Jaqua giving Seattle a 2–0 lead. The Galaxy gained a goal back in the 40th minute when Adam Cristman scored on a cross from Chris Birchall. In the 74th minute, Seattle midfielder Lamar Neagle scored from a cross by Álvaro Fernández, extending Seattle's lead to 2 goals.

On August 30, 2011, Sounders FC hosted their semifinal opponent, FC Dallas, in front of 4,593 at Starfire Sports Complex. Both teams started their first team players for the match. Seattle applied offensive pressure for most of the first half and broke through with a goal in the 40th minute. Fredy Montero, who had just missed with a bicycle kick shot moments earlier, took a curling left-footed shot in front of goal for the score. Dallas nearly equalized in the 49th minute when Marvin Chavez had a shot bounce hard off the goal post. Dallas continued to attack for most of the second half, and Chavez again had a chance to equalize just before the final whistle, but his shot went high over the goal. With a final score of 1–0, Seattle secured their third straight appearance in the U.S. Open Cup final match. Following the match, Dallas coach Schellas Hyndman complained about how hosts are determined for U.S. Open Cup matches saying, "for me, this is one of the best events – the Lamar Hunt Open Cup – but I'd really like to see it into a structure where it's not a bid system. A bid system is where one team will buy the games because they're bidding higher." He continued, "it could go to the higher seeds, instead of a bid system where you're spending money, or it could be pre-determined. I think that brings out all the fairness to the event."

== Pre-match ==
=== Venue selection ===
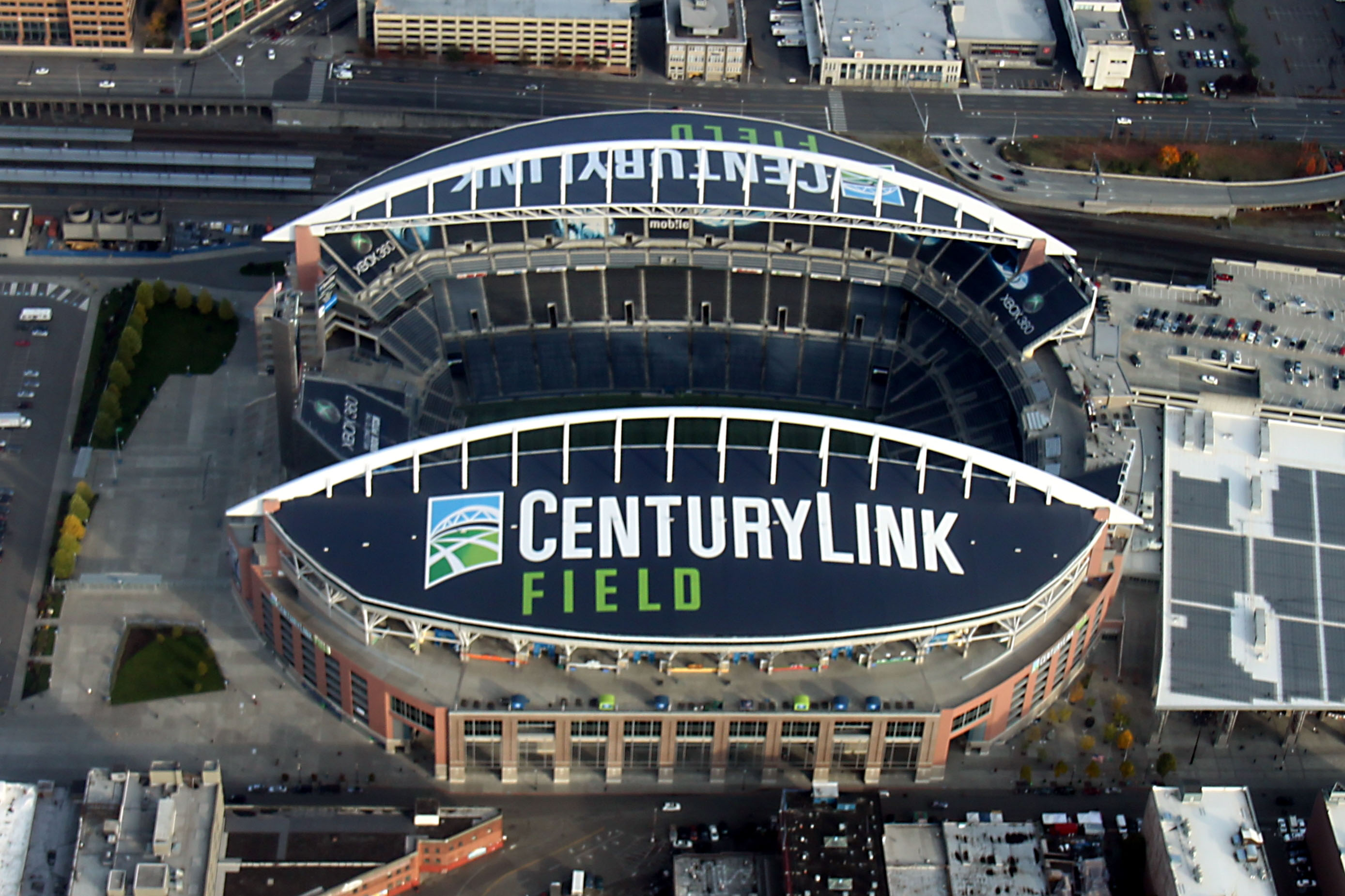
CenturyLink Field in Seattle

On August 26, 2011, U.S. Soccer announced the potential sites for the final, depending on the outcome of the semifinals. It was determined through a blind bid process that if Seattle qualified for the final, they would host it at CenturyLink Field regardless of the opponent, for the second straight year. If FC Dallas defeated Sounders FC in the semifinals, they would host the Richmond Kickers at Pizza Hut Park in Frisco, Texas, or visit the Chicago Fire at Toyota Park in Bridgeview, Illinois, depending on the outcome of the other semifinal match. Seattle defeated Dallas and Chicago defeated Richmond in the semifinals, which resulted in Sounders FC hosting the Fire in the 2011 Open Cup final at CenturyLink Field. Seattle had hosted the previous final, in 2010, drawing a crowd of 31,311 and breaking the 81-year-old attendance record for the event set in 1929 when New York Hakoah defeated the Madison Kennel Club of St. Louis.

Tickets for the 2011 final went on sale to the public on September 6. By September 19, it was announced that 27,000 tickets had already been sold. Nine days later, ticket sales surpassed 30,000 and it was announced that the "Hawks Nest" bleacher seats in the north end of CenturyLink Field would be made available for the event. In the week leading up to the final, Sounders FC owner and general manager Adrian Hanauer indicated that sections of the stadium would continue to be opened to meet demand. He stated that "no paying customer would be turned away."

=== Analysis ===
With a better MLS regular season record and home field advantage, Sounders FC were the favorites to win the match; however, the Fire had improved throughout the year through better play from their wingers and midfielders.

Seattle and Chicago had met twice in MLS regular season matches in 2011. The first meeting, on April 9, 2011, resulted in a 2–1 win for Sounders FC in front of their home crowd. It was Seattle's 5th game of the season. The second meeting was hosted by Chicago on June 4, 2011, and resulted in a 0–0 draw. It was the first game for Chicago coach Frank Klopas as he replaced Carlos de los Cobos, who was fired by the club the previous week. As a player, Klopas had scored the winning goal for Chicago in the 1998 U.S. Open Cup final. As coach, ESPNChicago.com analyst Charlie Corr credited him with the team's successful shift in tactics since previously meeting Seattle.

In the days leading up to the final, Seattle had recently finished a long road trip. Chicago's schedule made the match their third in a week's time. In preparation for the final, the managers fielded weaker sides during their respective league matches two days before the game, allowing them to rest several regular starters. The Sounders were playing well, having already clinched a MLS playoff berth. A victory over the New England Revolution on the weekend prior to the final gave the team a three-game winning streak. The Fire had defeated Real Salt Lake on September 28, but their playoff chances were diminished after a tie against the Houston Dynamo on the weekend prior to the final.

== Match ==
The match was televised live on Fox Soccer with coverage starting at 7 pm PT (02:00 UTC). The attendance of 36,615 was a record crowd for the competition's final. Seattle's Emerald City Supporters unveiled tifo before kickoff depicting the Grim Reaper over the graves of D.C. United, the Columbus Crew, and the Chicago Fire.

Injuries to key players were a concern for both teams in the buildup to the final. For Seattle, midfielder Mauro Rosales's knee was injured and he did not recover in time for the final. Also, Sounders FC defender James Riley was recovering from a concussion. He practiced in the week prior to the final and started in the match. For Chicago, midfielder Sebastian Grazzini was a key player who was questionable before the match. Grazzini began the game on the bench for Chicago.

=== First half ===
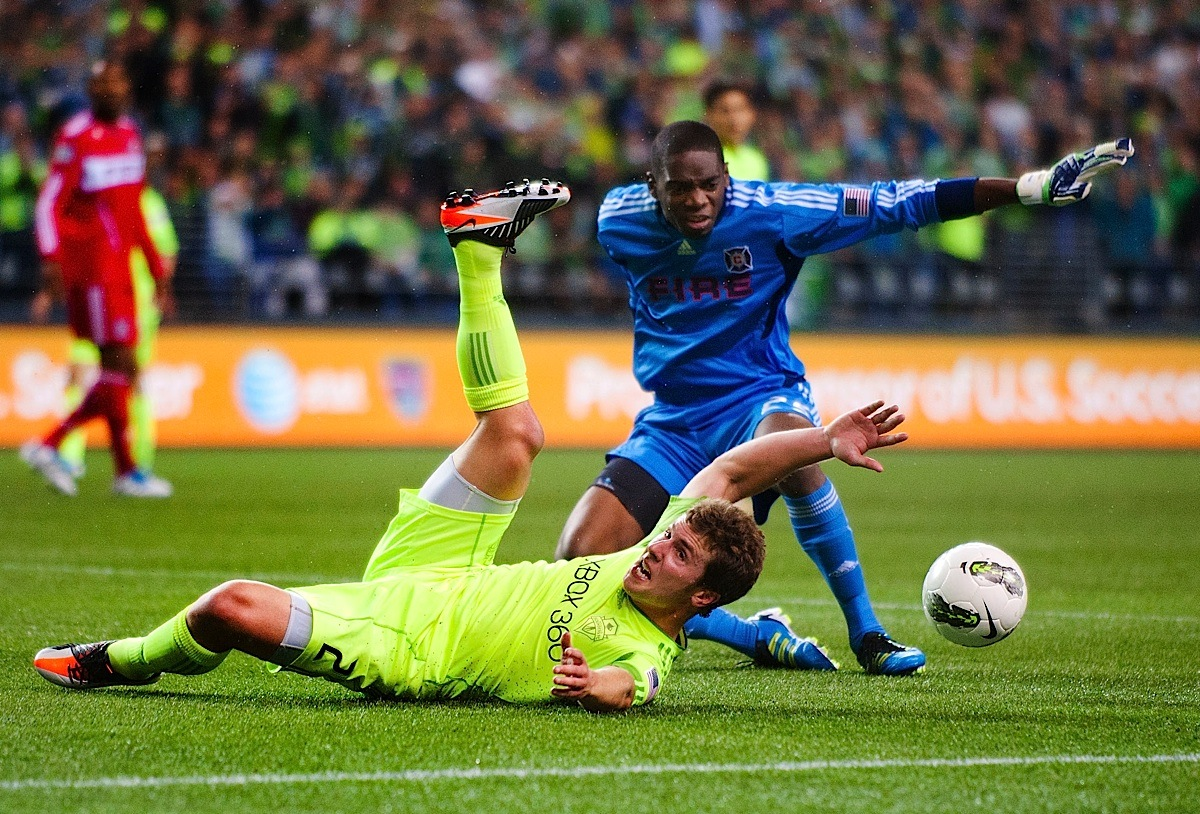
Fire goalkeeper Sean Johnson saves a scoring attempt by Seattle's Mike Fucito in the first half.

The match started with a frenetic pace as both teams earned free kick attempts within the opening two minutes. Seattle forward Mike Fucito had the first goal scoring opportunity of the match in the eighth minute as he broke free in the penalty area and took a shot on goal. The shot was kicked away by Fire goalkeeper Sean Johnson. Neither side appeared to gain control as the match progressed through the first 10 minutes. In the 11th minute, Chicago midfielder Marco Pappa slipped between two defenders in the middle of the field and had a long range shot go just wide of the net. Two minutes later Pappa again had a long shot which forced Seattle goalkeeper Kasey Keller to make a save. Pappa was responsible for all five of his team's shots in the first half. In the 26th minute, Patrick Nyarko was shown a yellow card by referee Alex Prus for a hard tackle on Seattle's Osvaldo Alonso near the touch-line.

As the match passed the 30 minute mark, Seattle began to take control as they held possession and created more scoring opportunities. Five minutes before half time Marco Pappa again tested the Seattle goalkeeper as he cut inside a defender and took a shot from 30 yards. The shot forced Kasey Keller to make a diving save. In the 44th minute Seattle striker Mike Fucito rushed onto a poor backpass by the Chicago defense and then backhealed a pass to Alvaro Fernandez who was streaking into the box. His shot was stopped with a reaching save by Chicago goalkeeper Sean Johnson. One minute later, in first half injury time, Seattle striker Fredy Montero nearly scored with a 20-yard shot that flew past the keeper and bounced off the left goal post. The half ended with the score tied 0–0.

=== Second half ===
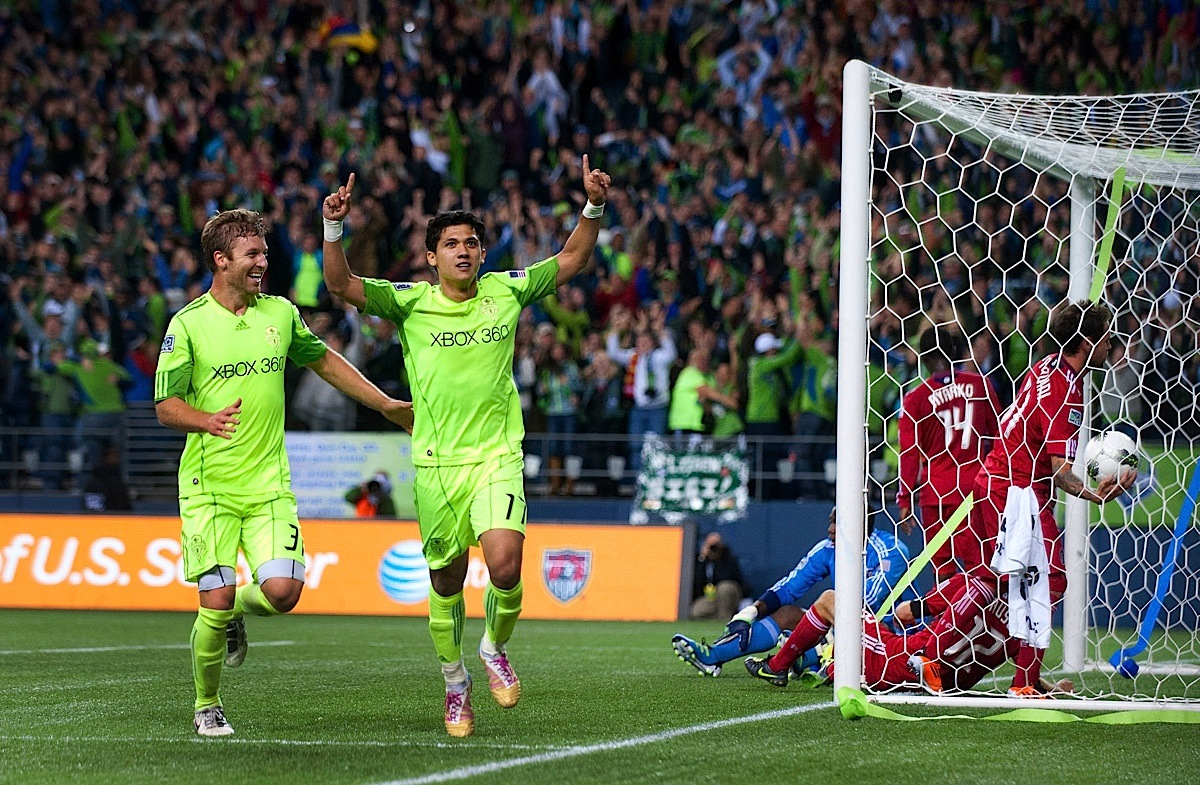
Sounders FC striker Fredy Montero celebrates after scoring his goal.

At half time, Seattle midfielder Erik Frieberg was subbed on for Alvaro Fernandez, who had suffered a slight concussion during the first half. Shortly after the second half began, Seattle nearly broke the stalemate. In the 53rd minute, a Sounders FC throw-in was flicked on to Mike Fucito, who lifted a shot up and over the keeper. His shot was chased by several Chicago defenders as it crossed the goal mouth and bounced off the far goal post and back into play. In the 78th minute, Montero broke the deadlock on a corner kick taken by Erik Friberg. Sounders FC defender Jeff Parke headed the corner kick on goal and Chicago goalkeeper Sean Johnson saved the shot. The ball rebounded to the feet of Fredy Montero, who tapped the ball into the net for in the first goal of the game. Sounders FC now had a 1–0 lead.

For much of the first half and early second half, Sounders FC's defensive efforts had been focused on closely defending Chicago midfield Pável Pardo. With Pardo unable to distribute the ball to Chicago's speedy wingers, Patrick Nyarko and Domonic Oduro, Chicago's offense had been effectively neutralized for much of the match. Fire coach Frank Klopas made two substitutions late in the match, bringing on forward Diego Chaves in the 80th minute and midfielder Sebastián Grazzini in the 85th. Chicago's best chance of the half came in the 90th minute when Dominic Oduro headed a shot toward Kasey Keller, who made the save even though the attempt was ruled offside.

As the match neared its conclusion, Chicago shifted players forward as they searched for an equalizing goal. However, in the sixth minute of stoppage time, Osvaldo Alonso scored Seattle's second goal on a counterattack play as he dribbled around multiple defenders and the goalkeeper and finally tapped the ball into the net. The goal gave Sounders FC a 2–0 lead and sealed the victory.

=== Details ===
October 4, 2011
19:00 PDT

Seattle Sounders FC	2–0	Chicago Fire
Montero 77'; Alonso 90+6'	Report

CenturyLink Field, Seattle, WA
Attendance: 35,615
Referee: Alex Prus (South Carolina)

Seattle Sounders FC	Chicago Fire

GK	18	Kasey Keller (c)
DF	7	James Riley
DF	34	Jhon Kennedy Hurtado
DF	31	Jeff Parke
DF	12	Leonardo González
MF	15	Álvaro Fernández		(substituted off) 46'
MF	6	Osvaldo Alonso	(yellow card) 90'
MF	3	Brad Evans
MF	27	Lamar Neagle
FW	17	Fredy Montero
FW	2	Mike Fucito		(substituted off) 89'
Substitutes:
GK	29	Josh Ford
DF	5	Tyson Wahl
MF	19	Sammy Ochoa
DF	20	Zach Scott
MF	21	Nate Jaqua
MF	8	Erik Friberg		(substituted on) 46'
FW	24	Roger Levesque		(substituted on) 89'
Manager:
Sigi Schmid

GK	25	Sean Johnson
DF	3	Dan Gargan		(substituted off) 85'
DF	23	Josip Mikulić		(substituted off) 61'
DF	5	Cory Gibbs
DF	13	Gonzalo Segares
MF	12	Logan Pause (c)
MF	17	Pável Pardo
MF	11	Daniel Paladini	(yellow card) 37'	(substituted off) 80'
MF	16	Marco Pappa
FW	14	Patrick Nyarko	(yellow card) 26'
FW	8	Dominic Oduro
Substitutes:
GK	1	Jon Conway
DF	6	Jalil Anibaba	(yellow card) 90'	(substituted on) 61'
MF	9	Baggio Husidić
MF	10	Sebastián Grazzini		(substituted on) 85'
FW	99	Diego Cháves		(substituted on) 80'
FW	15	Orr Barouch
MF	21	Michael Videira
Manager:
Frank Klopas

Man of the Match:
Osvaldo Alonso (Seattle Sounders FC)

MATCH OFFICIALS

- Referee: Alex Prus
- Assistant referees:
  - Steven Taylor
  - Eric Boria
- Fourth official: Josh Wilkens

=== Statistics ===
Overall

	Sounders FC	Chicago Fire
Goals scored	2	0
Total shots	10	5
Shots on target	3	3
Saves	3	3
Corner kicks	6	4
Fouls committed	12	18
Offsides	0	2
Yellow cards	1	3
Red cards	0	0

== Post-match ==
Most of the record crowd remained after the game as they watched Seattle players and coaches engaged in the post match trophy awarding ceremony and celebrated on the field. In the post match press conference, Sigi Schmid praised his team's defensive efforts in the match, saying "We talked about making sure their defenders – and primarily Pável Pardo – didn’t have a chance to lift their heads and hit those long balls in behind." Schmid continued, "I thought Evans did a really good job. Sometimes we were stretched in the midfield, but I thought he did a very good job of stepping up to Pável. When you look at the 90 minutes, it was a rare occasion that he was able to hit a ball behind our defense." Chicago midfielder Logan Pause commented on the game saying, "It's disappointing. We came here to win. We were under the gun all night. They’re a great team, one of the best in the league. It was a great atmosphere and home field advantage. The better team won tonight unfortunately."

The day after the match, Sounders FC flew a 3,000-square-foot (280 m^{2}) scarf over Seattle and Bellevue in the afternoon and early evening respectively, in celebration of their victory. By winning the final, Sounders FC became the first MLS team to win the competition three times in a row, and the first club to do so in the competition since Greek American Atlas did so in 1969, 42 years earlier. Seattle also became the fourth team in the 98-year history of the tournament to win three in a row. As U.S. Open Cup champions, Seattle received the $100,000 cash prize while Chicago was given $50,000 as the runner up. Seattle also earned a berth in the 2012–13 CONCACAF Champions League with the victory. In the Champions League, Seattle won their group and were eventually knocked out of the tournament in the semifinals by Mexican club Santos Laguna.

Sounders FC midfielder Osvaldo Alonso was voted the "player of the round" for the final. Alonso was recognized for his goal scoring effort as well as his record-setting fourth consecutive appearance as a player in the U.S. Open Cup final match. He had appeared first with the Charleston Battery in the 2008 final and then 3 times with Seattle from 2009 to 2011. Seattle forward Fredy Montero was recognized as the "player of the tournament" as he scored the game winning goals for Sounders FC in their quarterfinal, semifinal, and final matches. Osvaldo Alonso was one of the four finalists for "player of the tournament" along with Montero and two players from the semifinalist Richmond Kickers–Ronnie Pascale and David Bulow.

=== Host selection process changes ===
U.S. Soccer was criticized after the match for the secretive bid process that allows teams to outspend their opponents for hosting rights. Both the blind bidding process for hosting tournament matches and the manner in which MLS teams qualified for the tournament were widely criticized. An example of the concerns raised around hosting came from FC Dallas midfielder Daniel Hernandez on Twitter, where he complained about Seattle's home-field advantage throughout the 2011 tournament. Following the final, MLS and U.S. Soccer officials met to discuss rule changes to the tournament's host bidding system and team qualification processes. Sounders FC owner Adrian Hanauer commented on the changes and the possibility of raising the profile of the tournament, "I don’t think the bidding process is going to change the profile of the tournament, necessarily. It might make a few people happy, it might make a few people unhappy. But ultimately, I’m not convinced that's what is going to raise the profile."

In January 2012, in preparation for the 2012 edition of the U.S. Open Cup, U.S. Soccer announced several changes to the tournament format. Included in these changes was the introduction of a new host selection process. Beginning in 2012, for all rounds of the tournament through the quarterfinals, a random host selection process would be used. While in previous years a blind bidding system was used to determine the host of a match, the new process has the host determined by blind draw if both teams' venues meet minimum standards. The blind bidding system for hosting rights remained in effect for the semifinals and final of the 2012 tournament. However, U.S. Soccer announced in 2013 that hosting for all rounds of the tournament would be determined randomly as long as both venues met minimum standards.
