= Marko Marić =

Marko Marić may refer to:

- Marko Marić (footballer, born 1983), Croatian footballer, midfielder
- Marko Marić (footballer, born 1996), Croatian footballer, goalkeeper
- Marko Marić (Party of United Pensioners of Serbia politician) (born 1965), Serbian politician
- Marko Marić (Serbian Progressive Party politician) (born 1987), Serbian politician
