= 2011 U.S. Open Cup qualification =

American soccer cup qualification competition

The 2011 Lamar Hunt U.S. Open Cup tournament proper features teams from four of the five tiers of the American Soccer Pyramid. These four levels—Major League Soccer, United Soccer League's Pro League, the USL's Premier Development League, the National Premier Soccer League, and the United States Adult Soccer Association— each have their own separate qualification process to trim their ranks down to their final club delegations in the months leading up to the start of the tournament proper.

The event will feature 40 teams. Eight clubs from Major League Soccer will participate, six that automatically qualify based on last season's league position and two that qualify through a play-in tournament. In addition, 11 USL Pro League clubs, 9 clubs from the USL Premier Development League, 4 clubs from the National Premier Soccer League, and 8 USASA clubs and will also qualify.

The provisional second tier of the soccer pyramid, a reincarnation of the North American Soccer League, was disallowed by the United States Soccer Federation for the American-based clubs to participate into the tournament, mainly due to scheduling conflicts it would cause.

== Major League Soccer ==
The following MLS clubs have already qualified for the 2011 US Open Cup:

- Los Angeles Galaxy – 1st overall in 2010
- Real Salt Lake – 2nd overall in 2010
- New York Red Bulls – 3rd overall in 2010
- FC Dallas – 4th overall in 2010
- Columbus Crew – 5th overall in 2010
- Seattle Sounders FC – 6th overall in 2010

The following MLS clubs are attempting to qualify for the tournament:

- Colorado Rapids – 7th overall in 2010
- San Jose Earthquakes – 8th overall in 2010
- Sporting Kansas City – 9th overall in 2010
- Chicago Fire – 10th overall in 2010
- Houston Dynamo – 12th overall in 2010
- New England Revolution – 13th overall in 2010
- Philadelphia Union – 14th overall in 2010
- Chivas USA – 15th overall in 2010
- D.C. United – 16th overall in 2010
- Portland Timbers – Expansion club

=== Bracket ===
The bracket is loosely based on geography, rather than seeding. This is the first time qualification is bracketed geographically. In the previous years, teams were bracketed strictly according to seeding. Seeds 7–10 play an extra round. All teams in the top bracket are the westernmost teams, except for Chicago. All teams in the bottom bracket are easternmost teams, except for Houston.

Play-in Round
8	Chivas USA	0
10	Portland Timbers	2
7	Philadelphia Union	2 (2)
9	D.C. United (a.e.t.) (p)	2 (4)

Qualification Semifinals
2	San Jose Earthquakes (a.e.t.)	1
10	Portland Timbers	0
1	Colorado Rapids	1
4	Chicago Fire	2
3	Sporting Kansas City (a.e.t.)	1
5	Houston Dynamo	0
6	New England Revolution	3
9	D.C. United	2

Qualification Finals
2	San Jose Earthquakes	2 (4)
4	Chicago Fire (a.e.t.) (p)	2 (5)
3	Sporting Kansas City	5
6	New England Revolution	0

Qualifiers
4	Chicago Fire
3	Sporting Kansas City

Note: Scorelines use the standard U.S. convention of placing the home team on the right-hand side of the score boxes.

=== Play-in round ===
March 29, 2011	Chivas USA	0–2	Portland Timbers	Portland, Oregon
19:00 PDT	Mondaini (yellow card) 14'; Boyens (yellow card) 35' (yellow-red card) 43'; Braun (yellow card) 49'	Report	Purdy (yellow card) 74'; Jewsbury 84'; Brunner 86'; Hall (yellow card) 89'	Stadium: Merlo Field; Attendance: 5,061 (SO); Referee: Juan Guzman

April 6, 2011	Philadelphia Union	2 – 2 (a.e.t.) (2–4 p)	D.C. United	Boyds, Maryland
19:30 EDT	Ruiz 18'; Ruiz (yellow card) 73'; Valdes (yellow card) 39' (yellow-red card) 86'; Nowak (red card) 118'; Carroll 118'	Report	Fred (yellow card) 25'; Wolff 45'; Jaković (yellow card) 70'; Woolard 111'	Stadium: Maryland SoccerPlex; Attendance: 2,347; Referee: Andrew Chapin
	Penalties
	Le Toux (penalty scored); McInerney (penalty missed); Torres (penalty missed); Nakazawa (penalty scored)		Pontius (penalty scored); Barklage (penalty scored); Najar (penalty scored); Bošković (penalty scored)

=== Qualification semifinals ===
March 30, 2011	Colorado Rapids	1–2	Chicago Fire	Peoria, Illinois
	Akpan 46'	Report	45' Puerari; 61' Anibaba	Stadium: Shea Stadium; Attendance: 2,029

April 6, 2011	Sporting Kansas City	1 – 0 (a.e.t.)	Houston Dynamo	College Station, Texas
19:00 CDT	Bravo (yellow card) 46+'; Sapong 92'	Report	Sarkodie (yellow card) 5'; Palmer (yellow card) 43'; Chabala (yellow card) 65'; Boswell (yellow card) 73'	Stadium: Aggie Soccer Stadium; Attendance: 2,383

April 26, 2011	New England Revolution	3–2	D.C. United	Boyds, Maryland
19:30 EDT	Dube 37', 47'; Koger 67'	Report	Bošković 73', 83'	Stadium: Maryland SoccerPlex; Referee: Juan Carlos Rivero

May 3, 2011	San Jose Earthquakes	1 – 0 (a.e.t.)	Portland Timbers	Portland, Oregon
19:30 PDT	Opara 120'	Report		Stadium: Jeld-Wen Field; Attendance: 11,412; Referee: Alejandro Mariscal

=== Qualification finals ===
May 24, 2011	Chicago Fire	2 – 2 (a.e.t.) (5–4 p)	San Jose Earthquakes	Santa Clara, California
19:30 PDT	Barouch 61'; Cuesta 76'	Report	McLoughlin 14'; Morrow 43'	Stadium: Buck Shaw Stadium; Attendance: 4,124; Referee: Daniel Radford

May 25, 2011	New England Revolution	0–5	Sporting Kansas City	Overland Park, Kansas
		Report	Myers 9', 19'; Sapong 24', 88'; Collin 81'	Stadium: Blue Valley District Athletic Center; Attendance: 1,228; Referee: Sorin Stoica

== North American Soccer League ==
USSF President Sunil Gulati announced that NASL teams were being denied entry due to the lateness of their provisional sanctioning.

== USL Professional League ==
All eleven U.S.-based clubs qualified for the tournament.

- Charleston Battery
- Charlotte Eagles
- Dayton Dutch Lions
- F.C. New York
- Harrisburg City Islanders
- Los Angeles Blues
- Orlando City
- Pittsburgh Riverhounds
- Richmond Kickers
- Rochester Rhinos
- Wilmington Hammerheads

== Premier Development League ==
The PDL received nine berths to the 2011 U.S. Open Cup. One entrant from each division will be determined based upon the results of four PDL divisional games also serving as U.S. Open Cup qualifiers. Canadian and Bermudan PDL sides are not eligible for U.S. Open Cup play.

As part of PDL qualification, the Northwest Division spot was completely deadlocked between Portland Timbers U23's and Kitsap Pumas. Instead of going to a lottery, the two sides mutually agreed to hold an unprecedented "fifth game" tiebreaker, using their regular season game on June 3, 2011, to determine the slot.

=== Qualified clubs ===
Eastern Conference
Mid Atlantic Division	Reading United
Northeast Division	Western Mass Pioneers
South Atlantic Division	Carolina Dynamo
Central Conference
Great Lakes Division	Chicago Fire Premier
Heartland Division	Real Colorado Foxes
Southern Conference
Mid South Division	Chivas El Paso Patriots
Southeast Division	Central Florida Kraze
Western Conference
Northwest Division	Kitsap Pumas
Southwest Division	Ventura County Fusion

For standings see 2011 PDL season.

== National Premier Soccer League ==
In contrast to prior years, where NPSL teams had to qualify for the U.S. Open Cup through the USASA Regional tournaments, the NPSL was awarded four entries to the 2011 U.S. Open Cup. The NPSL elected to give one berth to each of its four divisions.

=== Northeast Division ===
The Northeast Division representative was determined by a three-team tournament played on May 7 and May 27, 2011.

Semifinal		Final
		Brooklyn Italians	2
FC Buffalo	0	FC Sonic Lehigh Valley	1
Brooklyn Italians	1

Brooklyn Italians qualify.

=== Southeast Division ===
The Southeast Division's qualifier was determined in a six-team tournament held at Finley Stadium in Chattanooga, Tennessee, on May 27–29, 2011.

First round May 27, 2011
Jacksonville United	1
Knoxville Force	0
FC Tulsa	1
Rocket City United	7

Semifinals; May 28, 2011
Jacksonville United	1
Atlanta Silverbacks Reserves	3
Rocket City United	0
Chattanooga FC	2

Finals; May 29, 2011
Atlanta Silverbacks Reserves	0
Chattanooga FC (a.e.t.)	1

=== Midwest Division ===
The Midwest Division slot was automatically awarded to the Madison 56ers. The 56ers earned the bid as 2010 U.S. Open Cup division qualifying champions, as well as the fact none of the other divisional rivals had expressed interest in a qualifying tournament.

=== West Division ===
The West Division representative was awarded to the club with the highest point total after its first seven league matches. The berth was clinched by the Hollywood United Hitmen after the San Diego Flash had two games forfeited by the NPSL for the use of an illegal player.

Team	Pld	W	L	D	GF	GA	GD	Pts
Hollywood United Hitmen*	7	7	0	0	34	3	+31	21
Santa Ana Winds	6	5	1	0	15	6	+9	15
San Diego Flash*	7	5	2	0	14	9	+5	15
Sonoma County Sol	6	3	2	1	16	10	+6	10
San Diego Boca	7	3	4	0	14	16	−2	9
Sacramento Gold	6	2	2	2	10	8	+2	8
FC Hasental	7	2	4	1	13	17	−4	7
Bay Area Ambassadors*	7	1	5	1	9	22	−13	4
Lancaster Rattlers	4	1	3	0	4	9	−5	3
Real San Jose	7	1	6	0	4	32	−28	3

Updated to games played May 19, 2011.
Tiebreakers: (1) Points; (2) Goal difference; (3) Goals scored
*-Includes 3–0 forfeitures imposed on San Diego Flash for using an illegal player

== USASA ==
For qualification into the U.S. Open Cup, the United States Adult Soccer Association organizes a series of state and regional tournaments to determine its regional participants. Each individual region's National Cup doubles as the qualification process for the U.S. Open Cup.

=== Qualified Clubs ===
Region I
Bracket A	NY Pancyprian-Freedoms
Bracket B	Phoenix SC
Region II
Bracket A	Iowa Menace
Bracket B	A.A.C. Eagles
Region III
Bracket A	ASC New Stars
Bracket B	Regals FC
Region IV
Bracket A	Doxa Italia
Bracket B	DV8 Defenders

=== Region I ===
The USASA Region I Cup determines two qualifiers for the U.S. Open Cup. The first round of qualifying begins on May 1, 2011. The national finals prior to the third round proper are scheduled between July 15–17, 2011.

Each of the states in Region I conduct their own state qualification propers from February to March 2011 to send representatives to the regional tournament. Delaware, Maine, New Hampshire, Vermont, and West Virginia did not enter a club into the 2011 Region I Tournament.

Qualification Semifinals
(Connecticut) Danbury United	0
(New York (state)) NY Pancyprian-Freedoms	4
(Rhode Island) East Providence Sports	1
(Massachusetts) MPS	4
Maryland Bays	2
(Pennsylvania) Phoenix SC (aet)	3
Atletico Virginia	1
(New Jersey) Go Soccer FC	2

Qualification Finals
(New York (state)) NY Pancyprian-Freedoms	4
(Massachusetts) MPS	2
(Pennsylvania) Phoenix SC	3
(New Jersey) Go Soccer FC	0

Qualified
(New York (state)) NY Pancyprian-Freedoms
(Pennsylvania) Phoenix SC

=== Region II ===
Each of the states in Region II conduct their own state qualification propers from to send representatives to the regional tournament. Kentucky, Minnesota, Missouri, Nebraska, North Dakota, Ohio, South Dakota, and Wisconsin did not enter a club into the 2011 Region II Tournament.

Round One
(Illinois)	RWB Adria	6
(Michigan)	Detroit United	4
(Indiana)	FC Indiana	2
(Illinois)	A.A.C. Eagles	7

Round Two
(Iowa)	Iowa Menace	7
(Kansas)	KC Athletics	1
(Illinois)	RWB Adria	1
(Illinois)	A.A.C. Eagles	4

=== Region III ===
Teams that qualify in Region III were invited to play in the Region III National Cup in Tuscaloosa, Alabama on Memorial Day Weekend. The draw for the tournament took place on May 26, 2011, the night before play bega. Alabama, Arkansas, Georgia, Mississippi, and Tennessee did not enter teams into the Region III Tournament.

Group A	Pld	W	L	D	GF	GA	GD	Pts
ASC New Stars	3	3	0	0	7	2	+5	9
Greenville Eagles	3	2	1	0	12	4	+8	6
Florida Gators	3	1	2	0	1	3	−2	3
Boston Avenue ACR	3	0	3	0	1	12	−11	0

Group B	Pld	W	L	D	GF	GA	GD	Pts
Regals FC	2	1	1	0	5	4	+1	3
CASL Elite	2	1	1	0	5	4	+1	3
Royal Eagles	2	1	1	0	2	4	−2	3

- Regals FC win tiebreaker penalty shootout with CASL Elite to advance.

=== Region IV ===
Group A	Pld	W	L	D	GF	GA	GD	Pts
DV8 Defenders	3	2	0	1	14	2	+12	7
Albuquerque Metro SC	3	1	1	1	7	8	−1	4
SF Italian AC	3	0	3	0	1	15	−14	0

Group B	Pld	W	L	D	GF	GA	GD	Pts
Doxa Italia	3	2	0	1	25	1	+24	7
San Francisco Rosal FC	3	2	0	1	16	3	+13	7
Tracy CV Eagles FC	3	0	3	0	1	35	−34	0
