= Marko Marić (Serbian Progressive Party politician) =

Serbian politician

Marko Marić (Serbian Cyrillic: Марко Марић; born 1987) is a politician in Serbia. He has served in the Assembly of Vojvodina since 2020 as a member of the Serbian Progressive Party.

== Private career ==
Marić holds a bachelor's degree in economics. He lives in Sombor and was appointed to the city's youth council in 2016. He is not to be confused with a different Marko Marić who served in the Assembly of Vojvodina from 2012 to 2020 as a member of the Party of United Pensioners of Serbia.

== Politician ==
Marić received the forty-second position on the Progressive Party's Aleksandar Vučić — For Our Children electoral list in the 2020 Vojvodina provincial election and was elected when the list won a majority victory with seventy-six out of 120 mandates. He is a member of the assembly committee on economy and the committee on youth and sports.
