= Cristian Nazarit =

Colombian footballer (born 1990)

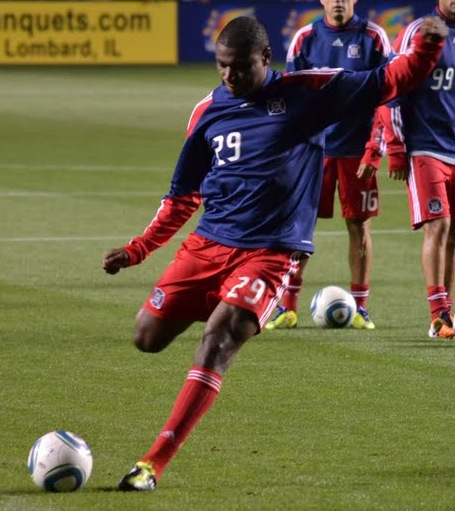
- Nazarit with Chicago Fire in 2011

Personal information
- Full name: Cristian Nazarit Truque
- Date of birth: 13 August 1990 (age 36)
- Place of birth: Villarrica, Tolima, Colombia
- Height: 1.86 m (6 ft 1 in)
- Position: Striker

Senior career*
Years	Team	Apps	(Gls)
2007	América de Cali	13	(0)
2008–2010	Independiente Santa Fe	42	(16)
2011	Chicago Fire	12	(2)
2012	Deportivo Cali	27	(6)
2013	Itagüí	16	(1)
2013	Deportes Concepción	9	(1)
2014	FC Gifu	34	(17)
2015	Consadole Sapporo	24	(5)
2016	Deportivo Pasto	29	(8)
2017	Independiente Medellín	13	(1)
2017–2018	Al Ahli	9	(2)

International career
	Colombia U17	12	(9)
2009–2010	Colombia U20	9	(1)
- * Club domestic league appearances and goals as of 24 July 2017

Cristian Nazarit Truque (born 13 August 1990) is a Colombian former professional footballer who last played for Qatari Club Al Ahli.

== Career ==
=== Club ===
Nazarit began his career in the youth ranks of América de Cali. In 2008, he moved to Independiente Santa Fe and eventually became a key player for the club, making 42 league appearances and scoring 16 goals. In early February 2011, Nazarit was linked to a move from Independiente Santa Fe to Independiente de Avellaneda in Argentina, but he did not join the club.

In May 2011, after completing a short trial period, Nazarit joined Major League Soccer club Chicago Fire. He made his official league debut on 28 May 2011 in a game against the San Jose Earthquakes. He had 3 shots in the game including one that hit both posts, which was finished by Dominic Oduro.

On 7 December 2011 the Chicago Fire announced they had released Nazarit and teammate Gabriel Ferrari.

He took trial term in Winter training camp with FC Gifu and then signed them for 2014 season. He scored 17 goals for the club then transferred to Consadole Sapporo for 2015 season.

=== International ===
Nazarit was a starter in the Colombian under-17 team that made it to the Round of 16 of the 2007 FIFA U-17 World Cup. He was Colombia's leading scorer during the qualifiers, and was the second top scorer of the tournament.

Colombia national team coach Jorge Luis Pinto invited Nazarit to the training camp in October 2007 to train with the Colombia national team that would start off qualifiers at home with Brazil, but he has yet to make his senior international debut.

== Club statistics ==
As of 5 December 2015.

Club performance			League		Cup		Int'l Cup / League Cup		Total	
Season	Club	League	Apps	Goals	Apps	Goals	Apps	Goals	Apps	Goals
Colombia			League		Cup		Copa Sudamericana		Total	
2007	América de Cali	Primera A	13	0					13	0
2008	Independiente Santa Fe	Primera A	7	4					7	4
2009	Independiente Santa Fe	Primera A	11	4					11	4
2010	Independiente Santa Fe	Primera A	24	8			3	0	27	8
USA			League		US Open Cup		Int'l / League Cup		Total	
2011	Chicago Fire	MLS	12	2	2	0			14	2
Colombia			League		Cup		Int'l / League Cup		Total	
2012	Deportivo Cali	Primera A	29	6					29	6
2013	Itagüí Ditaires	Primera A	21	2					21	2
Chile			League		Cup		Int'l / League Cup		Total	
2013	Deportes Concepción	Primera B	10	1					10	1
Japan			League		Emperor's Cup		League Cup		Total	
2014	FC Gifu	J2 League	34	17	0	0	-		34	17
2015	Consadole Sapporo	J2 League	24	5	2	1	-		26	6
Career total			196	54	4	1	6	0	206	56
