= Marko Marić (Party of United Pensioners of Serbia politician) =

Serbian politician (born 1965)

Marko Marić (Serbian Cyrillic: Марко Марић; born 1965) is a politician in Serbia. He served in the Assembly of Vojvodina from 2012 to 2020 and is now an assistant mayor of Subotica.

== Private career ==
Marić has a master of economics degree. He lives in Subotica. He is not to be confused with a different Marko Marić, who was elected to the Assembly of Vojvodina in 2020 as a member of the Serbian Progressive Party.

== Politician ==
=== Assembly of Vojvodina ===
The PUPS contested the 2012 Vojvodina provincial election in an alliance with the Socialist Party of Serbia. Marić appeared in the eighth position on the Socialist-led list and was elected when the list won nine mandates. The election was won by the Democratic Party and its allies, and Marić served for the next four years in opposition.

For the 2016 provincial election, the PUPS formed a new alliance with the Progressive Party. Marić appeared in the twenty-ninth position on the Progressive Party's Aleksandar Vučić – Serbia Is Winning list and was re-elected when the list won a majority victory with sixty-three out of 120 mandates. He did not seek re-election at the provincial level in 2020.

=== Municipal politics ===
Marić appeared in the eighth position on the Socialist-led list for the Subotica city assembly in the 2012 Serbian local elections. The list won four mandates, and he was not elected.

He was given the thirteenth position on the Progressive-led list in the 2016 local elections and was elected when the list won a plurality victory with thirty-one out of sixty-seven mandates. For the 2020 local elections, he was given the seventeenth position on the Progressive list and was re-elected when the list again won thirty-one seats.

On 10 February 2021, Marić was appointed as assistant mayor of Subotica with responsibility for communal activities and public companies. By virtue of holding this position, he was required to resign from the city assembly.
