= Zagrad, Velika Kladuša =

Zagrad
- Village
- Location within Bosnia and Herzegovina
- Coordinates: 45.181418°N 15.791567°E
- Country: Bosnia and Herzegovina
- Entity: Federation of Bosnia and Herzegovina
- Canton: Una-Sana
- Municipality: Velika Kladuša

Area
  - Total: 0.98 sq mi (2.54 km^{2})

Population (2013)
  - Total: 1,234
  - Density: 1,260/sq mi (486/km^{2})
- Time zone: UTC+1 (CET)
  - Summer (DST): UTC+2 (CEST)

Zagrad is a village in the municipality of Velika Kladuša, Bosnia and Herzegovina.

== Demographics ==
According to the 2013 census, its population was 1,234.

Ethnicity in 2013
Ethnicity	Number	Percentage
Bosniaks	1,019	82.6%
Croats	23	1.9%
Serbs	2	0.2%
other/undeclared	190	15.4%
Total	1,234	100%
