= Baggio Hušidić =

Bosnian footballer (born 1987)

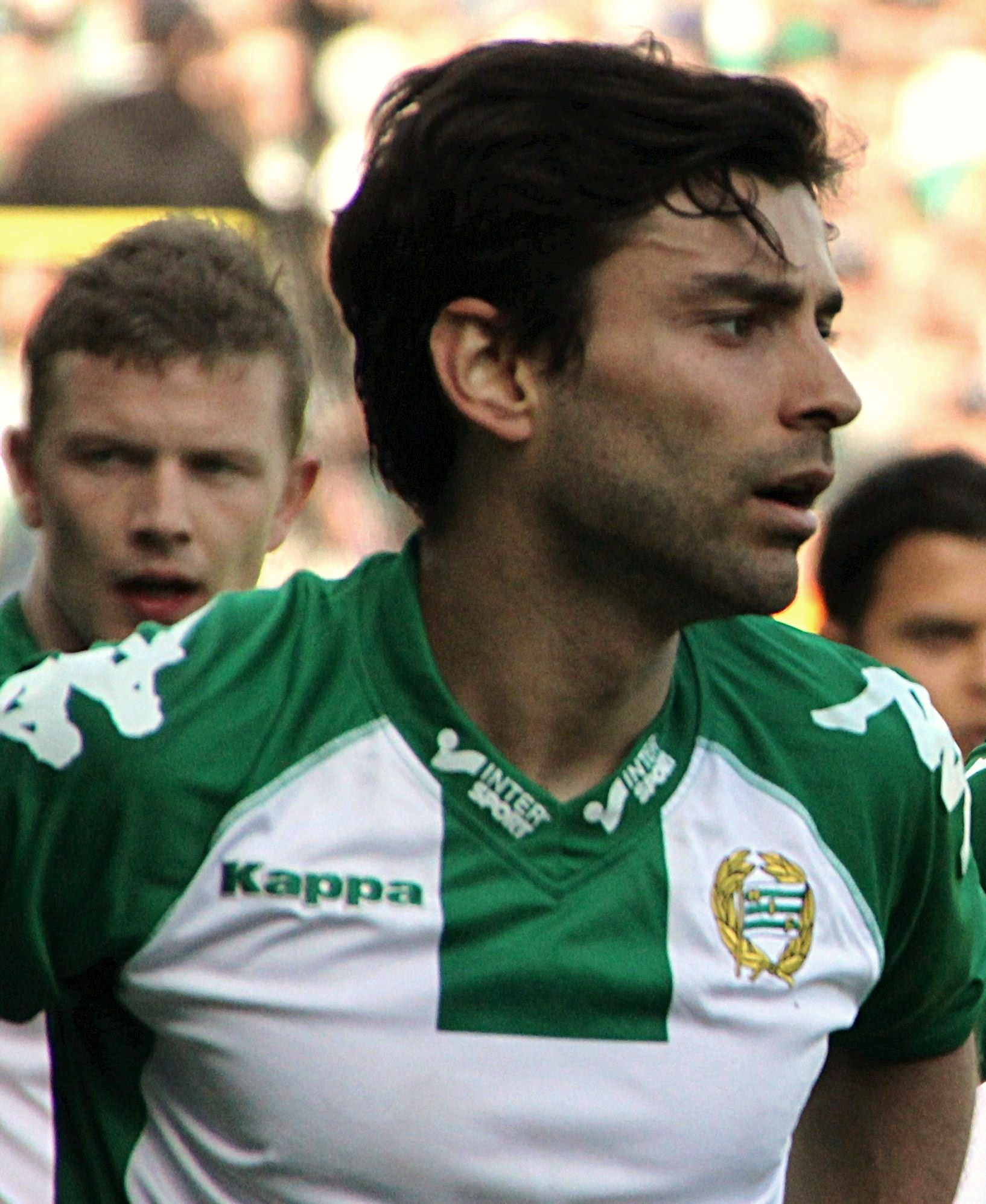
- Hušidić plays for Hammarby IF in 2013

Personal information
- Full name: Adis Hušidić
- Date of birth: 19 May 1987 (age 39)
- Place of birth: Zagrad, SR Bosnia and Herzegovina, Yugoslavia
- Height: 6 ft 1 in (1.85 m)
- Position: Midfielder

College career
Years	Team	Apps	(Gls)
2006–2008	UIC Flames		

Senior career*
Years	Team	Apps	(Gls)
2009–2011	Chicago Fire	50	(5)
2012–2013	Hammarby IF	41	(1)
2014–2018	LA Galaxy	104	(9)
2015	→ LA Galaxy II (loan)	2	(0)
Total		197	(15)

International career
2016	Bosnia and Herzegovina	1	(0)

Managerial career
- 2019–2021: Saint Mary's Gaels (assistant)
- 2021–2023: San Francisco Dons (assistant)
- 2023–2024: Puerto Rico (assistant)
- 2025: St. Louis City 2 (assistant)
- 2025–: St. Louis City SC (assistant)
- * Club domestic league appearances and goals as of 26 June 2025

Adis "Baggio" Hušidić (born 19 May 1987) is a Bosnian former footballer. He mainly played as a midfielder but was also deployed as a left-back.

== Early life ==
Born in Zagrad, Velika Kladuša, Bosanska Krajina, SR Bosnia, SFR Yugoslavia (present-day Bosnia and Herzegovina), Hušidić and his family fled Bosnia in the mid-1990s to escape the Bosnian War, spending time in a refugee camp in southern Croatia, and living in Hamburg, Germany for several years, before eventually settling in the US in 1997.

== Career ==
=== Youth and college ===
Hušidić attended Libertyville High School. He also played club soccer for Sockers FC Chicago, who he helped reach state, regional and national championship tournaments. He played college soccer at the University of Illinois at Chicago from 2006 to 2008, where he was named to the Horizon League All-Newcomer Team as a freshman, and to the All-Horizon League First Team as a sophomore in 2007.

=== Professional ===
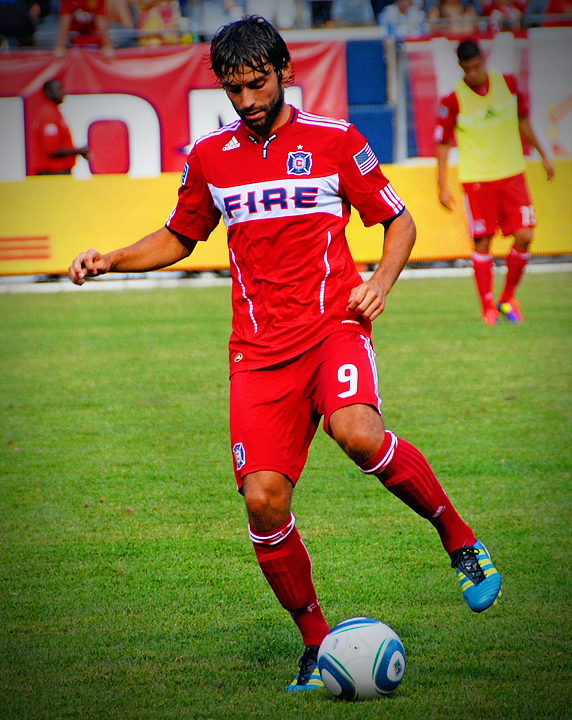
Hušidić playing for Chicago Fire

Husidić was drafted in the second round (20th overall) of the 2009 MLS SuperDraft by Chicago Fire, and signed a Generation Adidas contract. He made his professional debut on 28 May 2009, coming on as a late substitute for Gonzalo Segares in a game against Chivas USA. He scored his first career professional goal on 24 April 2010 in a game against Houston Dynamo.

It was announced on 18 November 2010 that Hušidić would graduate from the MLS Generation Adidas program at the end of the 2010 season. Baggio had his breakout season in 2010. He proved to be a vital part of the Fire, scoring goals and filling in voids in the midfield.

Hušidić didn't have a great season in 2011 and received only limited playing time. At season's end, Chicago declined his 2012 contract option and he entered the 2011 MLS Re-Entry Draft. Hušidić was selected by Colorado Rapids in stage 2 of the draft on 12 December 2011. However, Hušidić spurned Colorado and instead signed with Swedish second division side Hammarby IF on 23 December 2011.

Despite still being with Hammarby, LA Galaxy acquired the MLS rights to Hušidić in a trade with Colorado on 17 June 2013. On 11 November 2013, LA Galaxy head coach Bruce Arena confirmed that the team had signed Hušidić from Hammarby. On 21 May 2016 Husidić was called to join the Bosnian national team for a friendly match with Spain.

Hušidić was released by LA Galaxy at the end of their 2018 season.

He announced his retirement on 7 March 2019.

== Personal life ==
Hušidić was given the nickname 'Baggio' (after Italian player Roberto Baggio) at a young age by his father. He became a naturalized U.S. citizen while he was in college. An advocate of veganism, Hušidić has said of the benefits of his whole foods, plant-based diet: "I’m able to run the longest distance per game of any player on my team. My recovery rate is much faster. My muscles recover much quicker than most other players. My energy level is high; I nap once a year. I sleep very well, averaging around 9 1/2 hours a night. I’m always happy, I have clear skin and no body odor, and I rarely ever get ill. I could go on and on."

== Honors ==
=== Club ===
LA Galaxy

- MLS Cup: 2014
