= Bratislav Ristić =

Serbian footballer

Personal information
- Full name: Bratislav Ristić
- Date of birth: January 21, 1980 (age 46)
- Place of birth: Niš, Yugoslavia
- Height: 1.77 m (5 ft 10 in)
- Position: Midfielder

Youth career
- Radnički Niš

Senior career*
| Years | Team | Apps | (Gls) |
| 1998–2003 | Club Brugge | 16 | (0) |
| 2003–2007 | Metalurh Donetsk | 65 | (1) |
| 2006–2007 | → Málaga (loan) | 21 | (3) |
| 2008 | Kuban Krasnodar | 15 | (4) |
| 2009 | Slavia Sofia | 9 | (3) |
| 2009–2010 | Rad | 24 | (7) |
| 2010–2011 | Chicago Fire | 17 | (0) |
| 2012 | Olimpik Sarajevo | 3 | (0) |
| 2013–2016 | Čelik Nikšić | 6 | (0) |
| Total | | 176 | (18) |

International career
- Yugoslavia U18
- * Club domestic league appearances and goals

Bratislav Ristić (born 21 January 1980) is a current sports agent and former Serbian footballer who last played for FK Čelik Nikšić.

== Career ==
=== Club career ===
He started his career with Club Brugge KV, and later played for FC Metalurh Donetsk, Málaga CF and FC Kuban Krasnodar.

He then had a spell with PFC Slavia Sofia, before joining Serbian side FK Rad.

Ristić joined Chicago Fire FC of Major League Soccer in September 2010. Ristic played in seventeen games for Chicago Fire, starting in thirteen of them. On July 25, 2011 he was released by the club.

=== International career ===
In 1998 Ristić was selected to play for the National Team of FR Yugoslavia at the under-18 level. He played 10 matches for the U-18 National Team.

== Honours ==
Club Brugge

- Belgian Cup: 2001–02
- Belgian Super Cup: 2002
