= Davis Paul =

American professional soccer player (born 1988)

Personal information
- Full name: Davis Paul
- Date of birth: October 12, 1988 (age 38)
- Place of birth: San Diego, United States
- Height: 5 ft 9 in (1.75 m)
- Positions: Attacking midfielder; winger

College career
| Years | Team | Apps | (Gls) |
| 2007–2010 | California Golden Bears | 75 | (18) |

Senior career*
| Years | Team | Apps | (Gls) |
| 2008 | Los Angeles Legends | 12 | (10) |
| 2011 | Chicago Fire | 7 | (2) |
| 2011 | Chicago Fire Premier | 3 | (3) |
| 2012 | Strømsgodset Toppfotball | 2 | (0) |
- * Club domestic league appearances and goals as of March 1st, 2013

Davis Paul (born October 12, 1988) is and American former professional soccer player who last played for the Chicago Fire in Major League Soccer.

== Career ==
=== Amateur and college ===
Davis attended Damien High School where he was recognized as a multi-sport Youth All-American, leading the school to back-to-back CIF Division One Championships while receiving first team All-CIF, Sierra League and San Gabriel Valley Honors. He played club soccer for Arsenal FC of the Premier Coast Soccer League, becoming the first ever 3-Peat US Youth Soccer National Champion and earning Gold Boot honors in 2006 as Player of the Tournament.

Selected to Generation Adidas Elite Soccer Program (ESP) in 2006, Paul earned an All-Star Game selection, scoring the game-winning goal. As a member of the US Olympic National Team pool, Paul led Cal South ODP to a National Championship, tied as the top scorer of the tournament and garnering his 2nd Gold Boot Award. He was later selected by College Soccer News to the "100 Freshmen From Coast To Coast To Keep An Eye On" before committing to UC Berkeley his senior year.

Paul played college soccer at the University of California, Berkeley, where he scored 18 goals and 21 assists in 75 appearances for the team.

During the regular season, he led the Pac-10 in points (28), goals (8) assists (13) and game-winners (4). Along with many other accolades including Athlete of the Year at UC Berkeley, he claimed four Pac-10 Player of the Week honors.

During college, Paul played several summer seasons with the Los Angeles Legends in the USL Premier Development League, scoring 10 goals and notching 5 assists in 12 games. He graduated a semester early in 2010 to pursue a professional soccer career, being invited to the January 2011 Major League Soccer combine in Florida.

=== Professional ===
On January 14, 2011, Paul was drafted #51 overall in the 2011 MLS SuperDraft by the Chicago Fire. He made his professional debut on March 30, 2011, starting in a Lamar Hunt US Open Cup game against the Colorado Rapids, and made his MLS debut on April 17 against Los Angeles Galaxy.

Paul was waived by Chicago and subsequently re-signed to their U23 team until joining the Seattle Sounders until the end of the season. He had a short stint with Sporting Kansas City before moving to Norwegian First Division on a temporary visa.

Upon his return, he played in the Lamar Hunt Open Cup with PSA Elite, where he helped the team advance to the round of 16 with two goals over Major League Soccer's Portland Timbers

== Non-football career ==
Paul co-founded Lovely Day Studios in 2018 with Kia Dahl. He was credited as director and director of photography on the Telly Award-winning project Adidas Samba | "Going Nowhere", and was credited as a creative producer on the Webby Award-winning Atlanta Falcons project Records Are Made to Be Broken: Falcons Mascot Soars Into Record Books.
