= Pari Pantazopoulos =

American soccer player

Paraskevas "Pari" Pantazopoulos
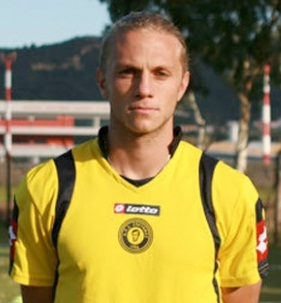

Personal information
- Full name: Paraskevas Pantazopoulos
- Date of birth: 17 September 1988 (age 38)
- Place of birth: Athens, Greece
- Height: 6 ft 0 in (1.83 m)
- Position: Defender

Team information
- Current team: Panathinaikos Chicago

Youth career
- 1992–1998: Vrilisia
- 2000-2007: Chicago Magic

Senior career*
Years	Team	Apps	(Gls)
2007	ASIL Lysi	20	(2)
2008–2009	Zakynthos	20	(2)
2009–2010	Korinthos	9	(1)
2010	Aspropyrgos Enosis	9	(1)
2010-2012	Chicago Fire	15	(0)
2012	Puerto Rico Islanders	25	(0)
2013	Chicago Inferno		
2020–	Panathinaikos Chicago	0	(0)
- * Club domestic league appearances and goals as of 2 July 2020

Paraskevas "Pari" Pantazopoulos (Greek: Παρασκευάς Πανταζόπουλος; born 17 September 1988 in Athens) is a Greek-born American soccer player who currently plays for Panathinaikos Chicago in the National Premier Soccer League.

== Career ==
=== Youth and high school ===
Pantazopoulos was born in Athens and began playing football at the age of four. He played for the Athens youth team Vrilisia F.C. for four years before his family moved to the United States in 1998. In Chicago, he played with the US Youth Soccer Olympic Development Program where he was recognized by the Chicago Magic, one of America's top boys' sides.

Pantazopoulos played in the Chicago Magic's starting XI and reached the US Youth Soccer National Championships final in Florida where they lost 1–0 to California's Arsenal F.C. With the US ODP 1988's, he competed against the Brazilian team in Lloret de Mar, Spain in 2006.

Pantazopoulos was a regular with Prospect High School's starting XI. During his high school career with the Prospect Knights, he tallied 51 goals, earning an Illinois All-State team selection over his four-year high school career.

=== Professional ===
During Pantazopoulos' senior high school season, he was offered a trial by German first division side F.C. Koln but declined the offer in favour of remaining with his high school team. In 2006, he signed with ASIL Lysi, a second division team in Cyprus. In 2007, Pantazopoulos signed with Greek third division side A.P.S. Zakynthos. After two seasons in Zakynthos, Pantazopoulos signed a one-year contract with fellow Greek third division side Korinthos F.C. He spent the first half of the season with Korinthos and the second half with Aspropyrgos Enosis.

In January 2011, Pantazopoulos returned to the United States and won an open tryout, earning a trial with Major League Soccer outfit Chicago Fire, the club he has supported since his childhood. Chicago officially signed him to a contract on 4 April 2011.

Pantazopoulos was waived by Chicago on 11 March 2012, six days prior to the club's first game of the MLS season.

Pantazopoulos trialled with Indy Eleven of the North American Soccer League in 2013, before signing with Chicago Inferno of the USL Premier Development League.

In May 2020, Pantazopoulos was named team captain for National Premier Soccer League side Panathinaikos Chicago.
