= Michael Videira =

American soccer player (born 1986)

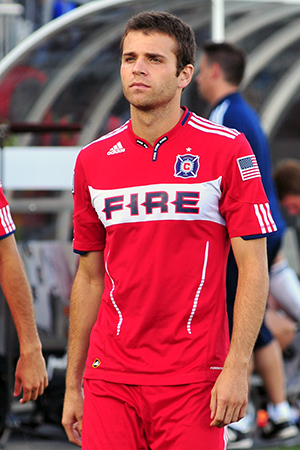

Personal information
- Full name: Michael Videira
- Date of birth: 6 January 1986 (age 40)
- Place of birth: Milford, Massachusetts, United States
- Height: 5 ft 10 in (1.78 m)
- Position: Midfielder

Youth career
- 2005–2008: Duke Blue Devils

Senior career*
| Years | Team | Apps | (Gls) |
| 2006 | Raleigh Elite | 5 | (2) |
| 2007–2008 | Cary RailHawks U23s | 19 | (4) |
| 2008 | Hamilton Academical | 0 | (0) |
| 2009–2010 | New England Revolution | 12 | (0) |
| 2009 | → Western Mass Pioneers (loan) | 1 | (1) |
| 2010 | AC St. Louis | 8 | (0) |
| 2011–2013 | Chicago Fire | 14 | (0) |

International career^{‡}
| 2003 | United States U17 | 14 | (0) |
| 2004–2005 | United States U20 | 2 | (0) |
- * Club domestic league appearances and goals as of 7 April 2013 ‡ National team caps and goals as of 25 April 2009

Michael Videira (born 6 January 1986 in Milford, Massachusetts) is an American soccer player.

== Career ==
=== Youth and college ===
Videira attended Noble & Greenough School, where he was a Parade and McDonald's high school All-American and the Gatorade Massachusetts Player of the Year as a junior, and played club soccer for the Greater Boston Bolts club team, where he played for Revolution assistant coach Paul Mariner alongside teammate Chris Tierney.

He played college soccer at Duke University, where he was a three-time semifinalist for the Hermann Trophy in 2005, 2006 and 2007, and was an NSCAA Third-Team All-American in both 2006 and 2007. Videira was also a four-time All-ACC selection and four-time NSCAA All-South honoree, was voted the ACC All-Tournament MVP as a junior, and was Soccer America's national freshman of the year in 2004.

During his college years, Videira also played with Cary RailHawks U23s in the USL Premier Development League.

=== Professional ===
Videira was drafted in the second round (18th overall) of the 2008 MLS SuperDraft by New England Revolution, but chose not to sign an MLS contract, and instead went to Scotland, signing with Scottish Premier League side Hamilton Academical. Videira did not make any first-team appearances for the Accies because of a string of injuries, and after being released from his contract in December 2008, finally signed with Revolution. He made his professional debut on 25 April 2009, in New England's game against Real Salt Lake.

During 2009 Videira also briefly spent time on loan with Western Mass Pioneers in the USL Second Division.

Videira was released by New England on 26 July 2010, and subsequently signed for AC St. Louis of the USSF Division 2 Pro League, eventually making 8 appearances for the team in the one and only season.

After AC St. Louis folded, Videira trialled with Chicago Fire during their 2011 pre-season and was eventually signed by the Major League Soccer club on 10 March 2011.

=== International ===
Videira is a former member of both the United States Under-17 and Under-20 teams, and played in the Croix International Tournament in Spain in 2003 and in the Milk Cup in Northern Ireland in 2003 and 2005.
