= Sebastián Grazzini =

Argentine footballer

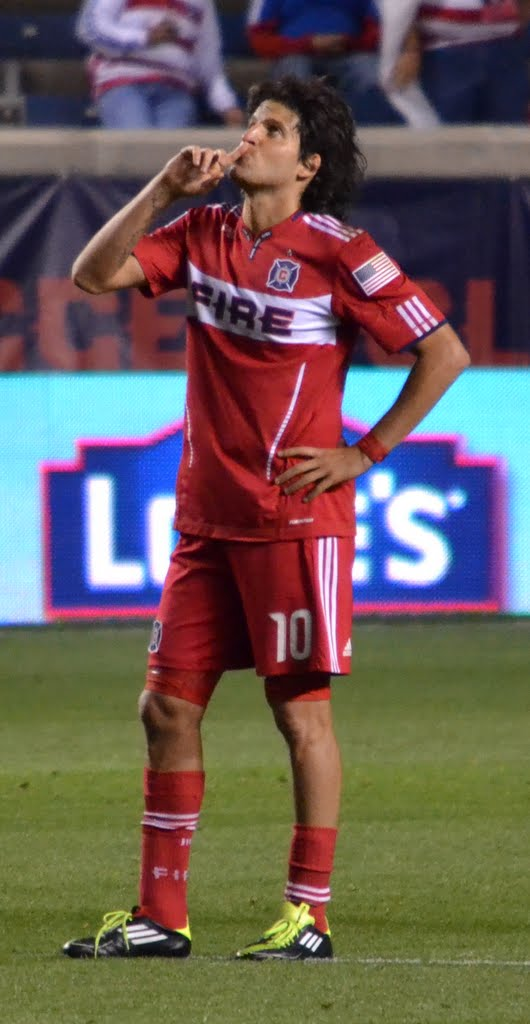

Personal information
- Full name: Sebastián Hugo Grazzini
- Date of birth: 25 January 1981 (age 45)
- Place of birth: Rosario, Argentina
- Height: 1.81 m (5 ft 11 in)
- Position: Attacking midfielder

Youth career
- 2001–2003: Central Córdoba

Senior career*
Years	Team	Apps	(Gls)
2003	Sevilla Atlético	0	(0)
2003–2004	Virton	9	(0)
2004	Central Córdoba	12	(1)
2005	Unión de Sunchales	14	(1)
2006	Italchacao	15	(6)
2007–2008	Sestrese	45	(22)
2008	Newell's Old Boys	9	(1)
2009–2010	Racing Club	34	(5)
2010–2011	All Boys	22	(5)
2011–2013	Chicago Fire	25	(7)
2012–2013	→ Atlético de Rafaela (loan)	25	(4)
2013–2014	Asteras Tripolis	10	(0)
2014	Patronato	11	(1)
2015	Rangers de Talca	11	(0)
2015	Nueva Chicago	10	(0)
2016–2017	Douglas Haig	53	(7)
2017–2018	Sportivo Las Parejas	14	(0)
2018	Flandria	2	(0)
2018	Central Córdoba	7	(0)

Managerial career
- 2023: Racing Club (reserves)
- 2023: Racing Club (interim)
- 2024: Platense
- 2024–2025: Monterrey (assistant)
- * Club domestic league appearances and goals

Sebastián Hugo Grazzini (born 25 January 1981) is an Argentine football manager and former player who played as an attacking midfielder.

== Career ==
Grazzini has played for a number of clubs in Argentina, Spain, Belgium, Venezuela and Italy. He began his career in the youth ranks of Central Córdoba. He impressed while with Central Córdoba and was signed by Spain's Sevilla FC, playing with the club's reserve side Sevilla Atlético. He then went on to play for Virton in Belgium before returning to Central Córdoba the following season. After a brief stop with Unión de Sunchales Grazzini left Argentina and signed with Venezuela's Italchaco. While with Italchaco Grazzini appeared in 15 matches and scored 6 goals. He then returned to Europe for the 2007–08 season joining Italy's Sestrese. While in Italy Grazzini was at top form scoring 22 goals in 45 matches.

In 2008, he returned to Argentina to play for Newell's Old Boys, the team his entire family has supported. Grazzini scored his first goal for Newell's in a 4–0 away win over Argentinos Juniors. On 13 March 2009, Racing Club de Avellaneda signed the midfielder on a free transfer. While with Racing Grazzini appeared in 34 matches and scored 5 goals, his most productive season in Argentina. Subsequently, for the 2010–11 season, Grazzini joined All Boys. He appeared in 22 matches for All Boys scoring 5 goals.

In June 2011 it was reported that Grazzini would be joining Major League Soccer side Chicago Fire on a one-year deal. The Fire officially announced signing Grazzini on 13 July 2011. On 17 August 2012, Chicago Fire loaned Grazzini to Atlético de Rafaela for the remainder of the MLS season.
