= Marko Marić (footballer, born 1983) =

Croatian footballer (born 1983)

Personal information
- Date of birth: 25 April 1983 (age 43)
- Place of birth: Zagreb, SR Croatia, SFR Yugoslavia
- Height: 1.89 m (6 ft 2 in)
- Position: Midfielder

Youth career
- 2000–2003: NK Zagreb

Senior career*
Years	Team	Apps	(Gls)
2000–2005	NK Zagreb	35	(0)
2001–2002	→ NK Marsonia (loan)	1	(0)
2005–2007	Egaleo	41	(1)
2007–2009	Lille	5	(1)
2010	Skoda Xanthi	3	(0)
2011	Chicago Fire	1	(0)

International career
- Croatia U21

Managerial career
- 2018: Dinamo Zagreb (assistant)
- * Club domestic league appearances and goals

Marko Marić (born 25 April 1983) is a Croatian former professional footballer.

== Playing career ==
=== Europe ===
Born in Zagreb, Marić began his career with Croatia's NK Zagreb and in two years at the club appeared in 35 league matches. In 2005, he joined Greek First Division side Egaleo. In two years in Greece Marić appeared in 41 league matches and scored one goal. His play with Egaleo did not go unnoticed and Marić started to receive interest from higher-level clubs.

In the summer of 2007 he signed a three-year contract with France's Lille OSC. In two years at the club Marić received limited playing time making five league appearances and scoring one goal. On 29 January 2010 the Croatian midfielder left Lille and returned to Greece signing for Skoda Xanthi.

=== North America ===
On 2 March 2011, Marić signed with Chicago Fire of Major League Soccer. He made his debut for his new team on 14 April 2011 in a game against the Portland Timbers. That proved to be the only match Marić played for Chicago before suffering an injury and spending the remainder of season on the injured reserve. Marić was eventually waived by the club on 14 September 2011.

== Coaching career ==
On 13 March 2018, Marić was named assistant coach of Croatian team Dinamo Zagreb in staff of manager Nikola Jurčević.
