= Josip Mikulić =

Croatian footballer (born 1986)

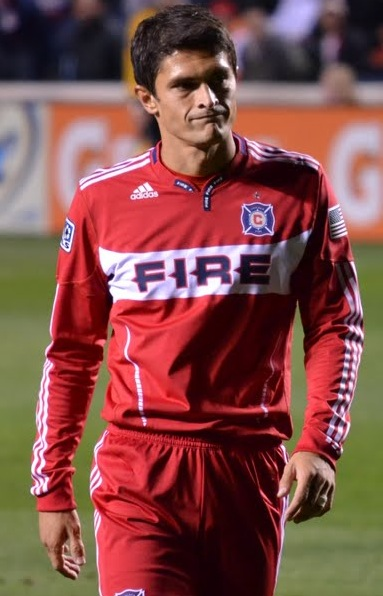
- Mikulić with Chicago Fire in 2011

Personal information
- Date of birth: 12 April 1986 (age 40)
- Place of birth: Ljubuški, SFR Yugoslavia
- Height: 1.87 m (6 ft 2 in)
- Position: Centre-back

Youth career
- 2003–2004: Dinamo Zagreb

Senior career*
Years	Team	Apps	(Gls)
2004–2005	Dinamo Zagreb	25	(5)
2004–2005	→ Croatia Sesvete (loan)	20	(4)
2005–2010	NK Zagreb	119	(9)
2011	Chicago Fire	18	(0)
2012–2013	HNK Gorica	15	(0)

International career
	Croatia U19	6	(0)
- * Club domestic league appearances and goals

Josip Mikulić (born 12 April 1986) is a Croatian former professional footballer who played as a centre-back.

== Career ==
=== Croatia ===
Mikulić was born in Ljubuški. He began his career in the youth ranks of top Croatian side Dinamo Zagreb before going on loan to Croatia Sesvete during the 2004 season. After one season with Sesvete he moved to Croatian top flight side NK Zagreb and remained there for five seasons, playing 49 league games for the team in total.

=== United States ===
Mikulić officially signed with the Chicago Fire on 6 January 2011 as a free agent. He made his debut for his new club on 19 March 2011, in Chicago's 1–1 tie with FC Dallas on the opening day of the 2011 MLS season. At the end of the 2011 season, Mikulić left Chicago to return to Croatia due to family reasons.

=== Back to Croatia ===
After returning home from the US, Mikulić was a free agent for seven months. After failing to find a club in such a long period, Mikulić agreed to sign for second division club HNK Gorica.
