= Diego Cháves =

Uruguayan footballer (born 1986)

Diego Chaves
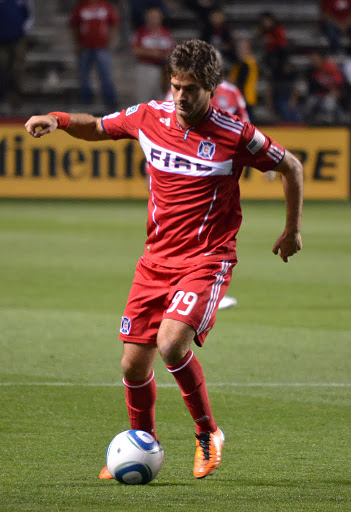
- Chaves in 2011

Personal information
- Full name: Diego Gonzalo Chaves de Miquelerena
- Date of birth: 14 February 1986 (age 40)
- Place of birth: Montevideo, Uruguay
- Height: 1.78 m (5 ft 10 in)
- Position: Forward

Youth career
- Montevideo Wanderers

Senior career*
Years	Team	Apps	(Gls)
2004–2009	Montevideo Wanderers	93	(27)
2009–2010	Querétaro	15	(4)
2010	Veracruz	9	(1)
2010–2011	Nacional	10	(1)
2011–2012	Chicago Fire	29	(6)
2012–2015	Palestino	66	(25)
2014	→ O'Higgins (loan)	27	(6)
2015–2016	Sarmiento	25	(4)
2016–2017	San Martín SJ	15	(2)
2017	San Luis	6	(0)
2018	Arsenal de Sarandí	12	(2)
2018–2019	Deportivo Morón	5	(0)
2019–2020	Sarmiento	4	(0)
Total		316	(78)
- * Club domestic league appearances and goals

Diego Gonzalo Chaves de Miquelerena (born 14 February 1986) is an Uruguayan former professional footballer who played as a forward.

== Career ==
Born in Montevideo, Uruguay, Chaves began his career with Montevideo Wanderers. There he played a total of 93 games in which he scored 27 goals. In July 2009, he received an offer from Querétaro FC and moved to Mexico. With Querétaro he appeared in 15 games and scored 4 goals.

Diego scored his first two goals for Querétaro while playing against Jaguares, with a final score of 2–2. His third goal was against Monterrey, but the team lost the game 3 to 1. In December 2009 he was transferred to Veracruz, a club that was looking to return to the maximum division in Mexico. He returned to Uruguay with Nacional in 2010.

In February 2011, Chaves signed with Chicago Fire of Major League Soccer. He made his debut, and scored his first goal for his new club, 19 March 2011 in Chicago's 1–1 tie with FC Dallas on the opening day of the 2011 MLS season. Chaves went on to score in each of his next two matches, a 3–2 win vs. Sporting Kansas City 26 March 2011 and a 2–1 loss at Seattle Sounders F.C. 9 April 2011 to become the first player in club history to record goals in each of his first three league appearances for the team. Chaves would finish the 2011 campaign with seven goals and three assists across all competitions, helping the team to its first appearance in the Lamar Hunt U.S. Open Cup final since 2006 where they eventually fell 2–0 at Seattle.

A report in the Chilean media on 15 January 2012 claims that the 25-year-old Uruguayan striker has signed with Primera División club Palestino after he and the Fire mutually parted ways. On 2014, Chaves was out on loan to O'Higgins, playing 27 matches and scoring 6 goals in league. In December 2014, he return to Palestino.

== Honours ==
O'Higgins

- Supercopa de Chile: 2014
