= Gabriel Ferrari =

American soccer player

Personal information
- Full name: Gabriel Enzo Ferrari
- Date of birth: September 1, 1988 (age 38)
- Place of birth: New York City, New York, United States
- Height: 1.88 m (6 ft 2 in)
- Position: Striker

Youth career
- –2005: BW Gottschee
- 2005–2007: MetroStars
- 2007–2008: Sampdoria

Senior career*
Years	Team	Apps	(Gls)
2008–2010	Sampdoria	0	(0)
2008–2009	→ Perugia (loan)	14	(1)
2009–2010	→ Foggia (loan)	14	(0)
2010	→ Ternana (loan)	5	(1)
2010–2011	AC Bellinzona	0	(0)
2010	→ Wohlen (loan)	6	(1)
2011	Chicago Fire	3	(0)

International career^{‡}
2007–2008	United States U20	4	(3)
- * Club domestic league appearances and goals as of July 26, 2011 ‡ National team caps and goals as of July 14, 2008

Gabriel Enzo Ferrari (born September 1, 1988) is an American former soccer player.

== Biography ==
Ferrari was born in New York City to a Brazilian mother and Italian American father. He is fluent in English, Portuguese, Spanish, and Italian.

== Club career ==
=== Early career ===
Ferrari started with Blau Weiss Gottschee where he won four New York State Championships. Ferrari played high school soccer at Saint Benedict's Preparatory School in Newark, New Jersey. He then continued his youth career in the system of Major League Soccer club MetroStars, now known as the New York Red Bulls. Gabriel was the captain of the MetroStars side that captured the U-16 North American Championship. He verbally committed to play college soccer at the University of Connecticut, but elected to sign a professional contract with Sampdoria instead.

=== Italy ===
Ferrari signed with Serie A club Sampdoria on January 17, 2007, in a deal that kept him in Italy until 2010. Gabriel made his Sampdoria debut on February 1 in a Coppa Italia match against Inter Milan, coming on as a substitute. He did not make any appearances in Serie A, the Italian top flight. In July 2008, Sampdoria announced that they loaned Ferrari out to Lega Pro Prima Divisione side Perugia. He moved on loan to Serie C side Foggia for the 2009–10 season. On February 1, 2010. he moved to Ternana Calcio.

=== Switzerland ===
In September 2010 Swiss Super League club AC Bellinzona announced they had signed Ferrari on a permanent transfer. He then went on loan with FC Wohlen in the Swiss Challenge League.

=== United States ===
Prior to the start of the 2011 Major League Soccer season Ferrari went on trial with Chicago Fire SC. After impressing during his trial stint, the club signed Ferrari on 24 March 2011. He made his Fire debut on June 18, coming on as a substitute in the 1–1 draw at the New England Revolution.

Ferrari was released by Chicago on December 7,2011.

== International career ==
Ferrari holds American, Brazilian, and Italian citizenship. His triple citizenship, primarily that with Italy, sparked a debate over which senior international team he might attempt to play for, as fears arose that Ferrari might play for Italy instead of his native United States, like Giuseppe Rossi. Gabriel quickly dismissed the speculation, saying:

"I'm a New Yorker. I grew up in the US and that is the country I would like to play for if I get the chance."

Ferrari scored the game-winning goal in his international debut with the US under-20 team in a 2–1 victory over the full Haitian national team on March 28 in Frisco, Texas. Ferrari was named to the 21-player squad who represented the United States at the 2007 FIFA U-20 World Cup.

In May 2008, Ferrari was named to the 22-player squad to represent the United States at the 2008 Toulon Tournament.

== Honors ==
- Sampdoria
  - Coppa Italia Primavera: 2008
