= Yamith Cuesta =

Colombian footballer (born 1989)

Personal information
- Full name: Yamith Cuesta
- Date of birth: April 17, 1989 (age 37)
- Place of birth: Turbo, Colombia
- Height: 6 ft 3 in (1.91 m)
- Position: Defender

Senior career*
Years	Team	Apps	(Gls)
2007	Santa Fe	24	(2)
2008–2012	Expreso Rojo	35	(0)
2009–2010	→ Chivas USA (loan)	15	(0)
2011	→ Chicago Fire (loan)	20	(0)
2012	→ Conquense (loan)	16	(0)
2012	América	15	(1)
2013	Paulista	0	(0)
2013	Chicago Fire Reserves	2	(0)
2014	Fortaleza	15	(2)
2015	Deportivo Pasto	3	(0)
2015	Aragua	21	(2)
2016	Independiente Santa Fe	7	(0)

International career
2009	Colombia U20	9	(1)
- * Club domestic league appearances and goals

Yamith Cuesta (born April 17, 1989, in Turbo) is a Colombian footballer.

== Career ==
=== Club ===
Cuesta made his debut in the Colombian First Division with Bogota club Santa Fe in 2007, playing 24 matches and scoring two goals.

In 2008, he joined Expreso Rojo in the Colombian Second Division, before being loaned to Major League Soccer side Chivas USA on August 15, 2009. He played in 11 games on a backline that only allowed 11 goals during his first MLS season.

He was released by Chivas USA on February 6, 2011. Chicago Fire acquired his rights in a trade with Chivas USA and immediately signed him on March 23, 2011. His loan deal with Chicago closed at the end of the 2011 season and the club considered acquiring him permanently. Cuesta is known for his strength and tough tackling, as well as his aerial threat.

=== International ===
Cuesta has played for the Colombian U-20 national team, and scored the game-winning goal a 1–0 win over Peru, but has never been called up to the senior squad.
