= Orr Barouch =

Israeli footballer

Orr Barouch אור ברוך
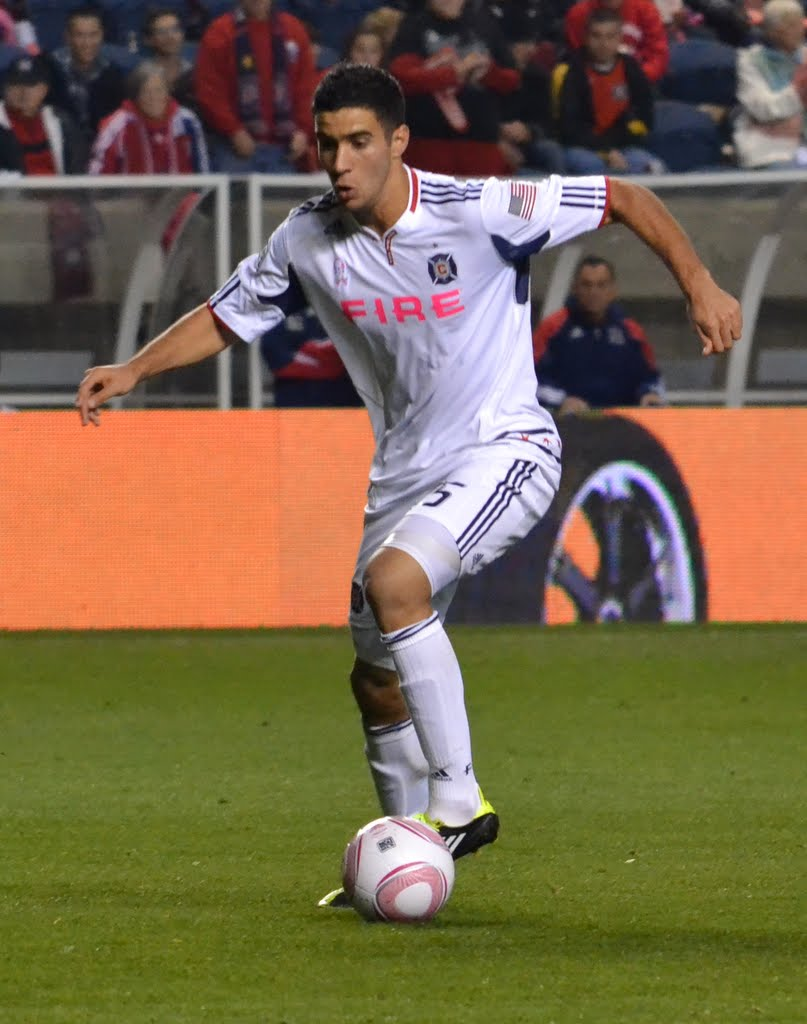
- Barouch with Chicago Fire

Personal information
- Full name: Orr Barouch
- Date of birth: 29 November 1991 (age 34)
- Place of birth: Haifa, Israel
- Height: 6 ft 2 in (1.88 m)
- Position: Forward

Youth career
- 2008: Chivas USA
- 2009–2011: Tigres

Senior career*
Years	Team	Apps	(Gls)
2011–2012	Tigres	0	(0)
2011	→ Chicago Fire (loan)	28	(2)
2012–2014	Chicago Fire	9	(0)
2012–2014	→ Bnei Yehuda (loan)	30	(3)
2014–2015	Maccabi Netanya	23	(2)
2015–2016	Biel-Bienne	10	(1)
2016	Orange County Blues	4	(1)
2017–2018	Hapoel Petah Tikva	33	(10)
2018	Hapoel Ramat Gan	12	(7)
2019	Cal FC	0	(0)

International career
2011–2013	Israel U21	8	(4)
- * Club domestic league appearances and goals

Orr Barouch (Hebrew: אור ברוך; born 29 November 1991) is an Israeli former footballer who played as a forward.

== Career ==
=== Early life and career ===
Barouch is Jewish, and was born in Haifa, Israel. He moved to the United States with his parents as a child. He grew up in Woodland Hills, California, attended El Camino Real High School and played in the youth ranks of Chivas USA. During the summer of 2009, Barouch was one of the athletes selected to tour Europe with the SuperElite Discover Europe team of top youth soccer players based in America. While with Chivas he drew the interest of Belgian side Club Brugge. However, in 2009 he elected to sign with Mexico's Tigres de la UANL. While with the Monterrey-based club, Barouch appeared in 24 youth team matches, scoring one goal, primarily as a left winger, and helped Tigres to a first-place finish in the Mexican U-20 Apertura tournament, but he never played for senior Tigres team.

=== Chicago Fire ===
During the 2011 Major League Soccer preseason Barouch joined Chicago Fire on trial. Barouch became the third Israeli ever to play in Major League Soccer, after Guy Melamed and Dedi Ben Dayan. Barouch impressed during his trial stint and was signed on loan from Tigres on 10 March 2011, with the American side holding an option to purchase his contract.

He made his professional debut on 19 March 2011 in Chicago's 1–1 tie with FC Dallas on the opening day of the 2011 MLS season., and scored his first professional goal on 24 May in a 2–2 tie with Toronto FC. On 2 December 2011 Chicago Fire purchased the rights to Barouch from Tigres.

On 13 September 2012 Chicago Fire announced it loaned Barouch to the Israeli club Bnei Yehuda Tel Aviv for the remainder of the 2012 season.

=== Bnei Yehuda ===
In August 2012, it was reported Bnei Yehuda purchased Orr Barouch for a fee of $400,000 signing the player to a four-year contract. However, there have not been any official announcements from either club confirming this.

On 14 February 2014 Chicago Fire announced Orr Barouch re-joined the team after a year and a half on loan with Bnei Yehuda.

After struggling for minutes in 2014, Barouch and Chicago mutually agreed to part ways on 11 June 2014.

== International ==
Barouch grew up in Southern California and is a U.S. green card holder. While trialing with the Chicago Fire in February 2011, he was scouted by then U.S. under-20 coach Thomas Rongen in a preseason match vs. the New York Red Bulls at Lockhart Stadium in Ft. Lauderdale, FL a 4–1 win in which Barouch scored all four goals. Barouch claimed he was trying to gain his U.S. citizenship with the hopes of joining the U.S. U20 team in the 2011 FIFA World Championships in Colombia, but "hangups" coupled with the team's failure to qualify for the tournament put the plans on hold.

With his impressive play for the Fire, Barouch received his first call up and cap for the Israeli U21 national team in a 4–1 friendly loss against England U21s on 5 September 2011. Barouch assisted on Israel's lone goal in the 25th minute.

== See also ==
- List of select Jewish football (association; soccer) players
