= Gastón Puerari =

Uruguayan footballer (born 1986)

Personal information
- Full name: Leonardo Gastón Puerari Torres
- Date of birth: January 23, 1986 (age 40)
- Place of birth: Paysandú, Uruguay
- Height: 1.73 m (5 ft 8 in)
- Position: Forward

Youth career
- 2004–2007: Selección de Paysandú

Senior career*
Years	Team	Apps	(Gls)
2007–2009	Rampla Juniors	30	(6)
2008	→ Emelec (loan)	3	(0)
2009–2010	Montevideo Wanderers	35	(8)
2011	Chicago Fire	14	(1)
2011	Atlas	3	(0)
2012–2013	Defensor Sporting	9	(1)
2013–2014	El Tanque Sisley	6	(1)
2014–2015	Juventud	43	(12)
2016–2018	Municipal	96	(26)
2018	Plaza Colonia	5	(1)
- * Club domestic league appearances and goals as of 17 February 2019

Gastón Puerari (born 23 January 1986 in Paysandú) is an Uruguayan footballer who most recently played for Plaza Colonia.

== Career ==
=== Uruguay ===
Puerari, a diminutive striker who can play as a left or right winger, started his career with Selección de Paysandú. After impressing several First Division clubs he joined Rampla Juniors in 2007. With Rampla Juniors Puerari appeared in 30 league matches and scored 6 goals. During the 2008 season he was loaned to top Ecuadorian club Emelec. Following a short stint in the Ecuadorian top flight he returned to Rampla Juniors.

In 2009, he joined Montevideo Wanderers and quickly established himself as a key player for the top Uruguayan side. In the 2010 Apertura season Puerari scored 5 goals in fourteen matches with Wanderers.

=== United States ===
On February 3, 2011 it was announced that Puerari was joining Chicago Fire in Major League Soccer. After starting off very well with the MLS club, Puerari failed to impress.

=== Mexico ===
On June 15, 2011, having played just fourteen MLS games for Chicago, it was announced that Puerari had been sold to Club Atlas in Primera División de México.
