= 2011 D.C. United season =

D.C. United
2011 season
- General manager: Dave Kasper
- Head coach: Ben Olsen
- Stadium: RFK Stadium
- MLS: Conference: 7th Overall: 13th
- U.S. Open Cup: Qualification Second round
- Atlantic Cup: Runners-up
- Carolina Challenge Cup: Winners
- Top goalscorer: League: Dwayne De Rosario (13); All: Dwayne De Rosario (13)
- Highest home attendance: 26,622 vs. LA
- Lowest home attendance: 11,254 vs. SEA
- Average home league attendance: 15,181
Home colors	Away colors	Third colors

The 2011 D.C. United season was D.C. United's 17th year of existence, their 16th season in Major League Soccer, and their 16th consecutive season in the top-flight of American soccer. D.C. United tried to salvage a poor showing last season where they finished at the bottom of the MLS standings. The season covers the period of November 1, 2010, through October 31, 2011.

Ahead of the preseason, then interim-head coach Ben Olsen assumed head coaching duties, under a three-year contract for an undisclosed price. Olsen became the first head coach in franchise history to both play for and coach the squad. Upon retiring as a player on November 24, 2009, Olsen became an assistant coach under head coach Curt Onalfo. On August 7, 2010, Olsen was named interim head coach after Onalfo was fired. Olsen finished the 2010 season with a 3–8–1 record. Several major offseason acquisitions were made, in both the offense and defense. Notable signings included Charlie Davies on loan, Perry Kitchen, Dax McCarty and Josh Wolff. In the summer, a major trade was made when United traded McCarty to their Atlantic Cup rivals, New York Red Bulls, for Dwayne De Rosario. During the MLS regular season, United regularly hovered in the middle of the league's overall table, frequently swapping positions barely in or outside of a berth in the MLS Cup Playoffs. Ultimately, their playoff run ended in the 33rd week of the campaign, culminating a six-match winless streak, that included five consecutive losses.

Outside of MLS, the team failed to qualify for the third round proper of the U.S. Open Cup for the first time since 2002. In the qualification propers, United lost 3–2 to New England Revolution in the MLS qualification semifinals. Before the MLS regular season campaign, United participated in the preseason Carolina Challenge Cup tournament, where the club defended their 2010 title by recording a 2–0–1 record in the pre-season competition.

== Background ==
The 2010 season marked the worst regular season record in United's history, as the club finished at the bottom of the Eastern Conference and overall league standings. As a result, United failed to qualify for the MLS Cup Playoffs for a league record-tying third year.

Midway through the season, head coach Curt Onalfo was fired and replaced by assistant coach, Ben Olsen. As interim head coach Olsen led the club to a 3–8–1 record, which advanced them to a season total of 22 points over 30 games.

The team concluded the regular season on October 23, 2010, with a 3–2 loss at home against Toronto FC. Club veteran, Jaime Moreno, earned his 133rd regular season goal during the final match of his professional career. Moreno departed professional soccer as the MLS career scoring leader.

== Preseason ==
=== November 2010 ===
On November 24, D.C. United acquired Dax McCarty and an allocation fee of roughly $35,000 from the Portland Timbers for Rodney Wallace and the lower of United's two fourth round 2011 MLS SuperDraft selections. Three days after playing for the entire MLS Cup 2010 McCarty was acquired by the Portland Timbers with the first overall pick of the 2010 MLS Expansion Draft. At 4:13 pm EST D.C. United announced it had signed McCarty from the Portland Timbers.

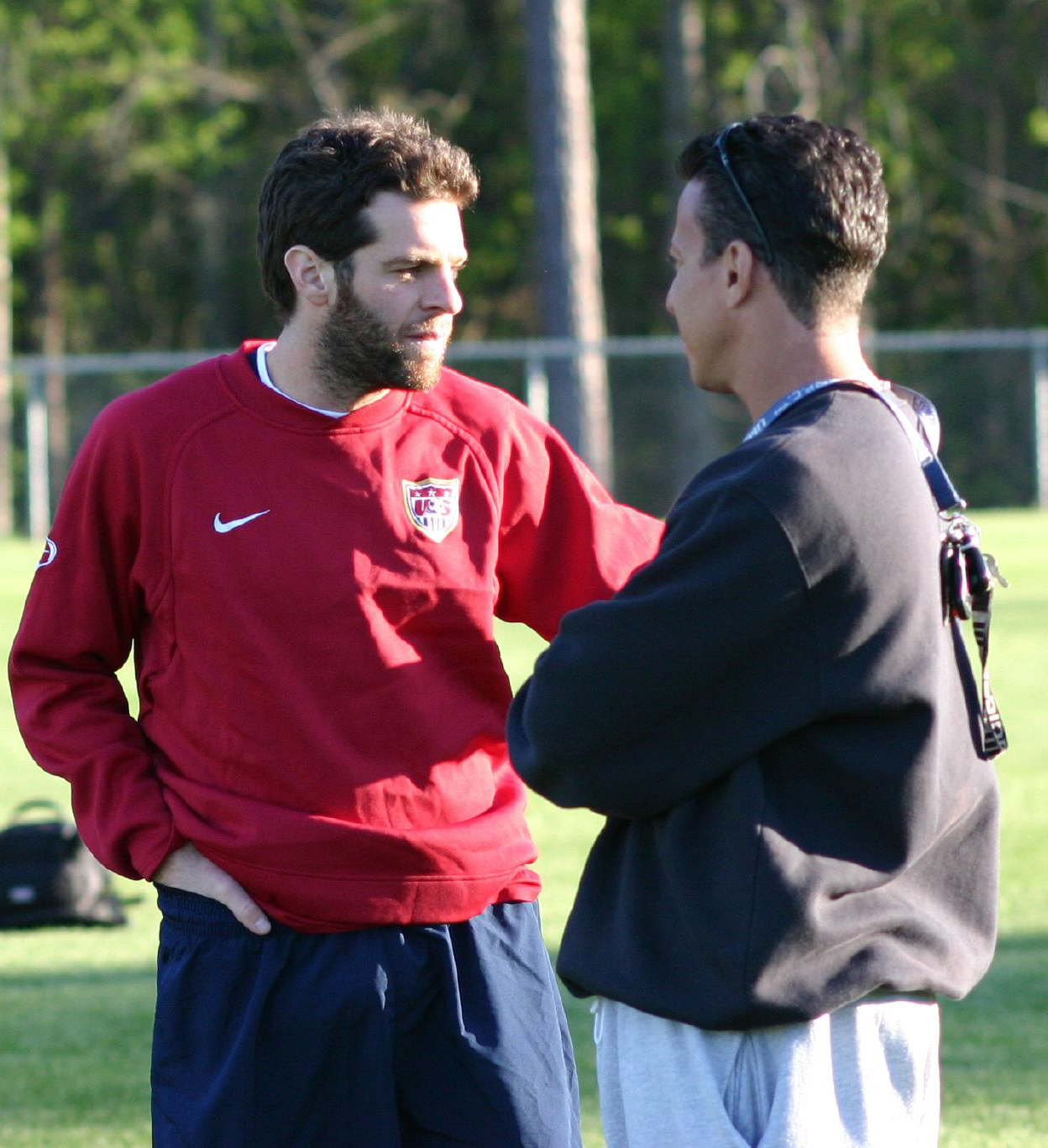
Former player Ben Olsen took over head coaching duties on November 29, 2010.

After much speculation for a new coach, United announced Ben Olsen became head coach on November 29, 2010. His three-year contract as an assistant coach was replaced with a new three-year guaranteed contract that also includes options for additional seasons. At the time of the announcement Olsen had only selected one assistant coach, Chad Ashton, who had been serving as technical director during the previous season. Mark Simpson, the goalkeeping coach, decided not to return to the club. Kris Kelderman, who had another year under his contract as an assistant coach, was named the head coach of the UW–Green Bay Phoenix men's soccer team in May 2010.

=== December ===
On December 2, D.C. United announced it would not exercise options on the contracts of defenders Barry Rice and Juan Manuel Peña, as well as midfielder Carlos Varela and Brandon Barklage.

On December 21, D.C. United announced MLS veteran goalkeeper Pat Onstad would join D.C. United as goalkeeping coach. Onstad retired after a 24-year professional career, including 136 regular season matches with the Houston Dynamo. It was also announced that Olsen would not hire a third assistant coach to replace Kris Kelderman.

On December 8, D.C. United acquired former Houston Dynamo forward Joseph Ngwenya during the first stage of the 2010 MLS Re-Entry Draft. On December 15, D.C. United acquired Josh Wolff from the Kansas City Wizards during the second stage of the draft. Ngwenya was guaranteed $156,000 for the 2011 season, which was an increase from his base salary in 2010 of $72,000. Wolff was guaranteed $160,000 for 2011, which was $60,004 less than his 2010 base salary.

Between the two stages of the MLS Re-Entry Draft, D.C. United signed D.C. United Academy player Ethan White. White previously played for the Maryland Terrapins before signing a homegrown player contract with D.C. United on December 14, 2010. He became the fourth academy signee within the last year for United.

=== January ===
The start of 2011 was highlighted by United's first selection in the SuperDraft, where they had the third overall pick in the first round. For the third pick, United drafted University of Akron standout Perry Kitchen, who was a key cog for the Akron Zips' championship-run in the College Cup the previous month. Club management expressed immense excitement in signing Kitchen, with head coach Ben Olsen and manager David Kasper sharing that if they had the first overall pick, they would have signed Kitchen.

Along with Kitchen, United signed Kitchen's teammate, Chris Korb in the second round, and in the final round, selecting Joe Willis, who last played for University of Denver in collegiate soccer, while playing for the Premier Development League's Real Colorado Foxes.

If I had had the number one pick, I would have taken him. I can't tell you how happy we are to have this kid.

— Ben Olsen, D.C. United Head Coach, upon drafting midfielder Perry Kitchen in the SuperDraft.

United also made one selection in the Supplemental Draft, choosing forward Blake Brettschneider in the second round. The Black-and-Red had previously traded its first-round pick and another first-round supplemental pick acquired in a SuperDraft day trade to Los Angeles Galaxy. United chose to pass on its third round Supplemental Draft selection.

On January 30, at the Washington Auto Show, United unveiled their brand-new third kits for the 2011 season. The third kit, marked the first time in club history that the team will don a third kit during any year campaign. The new third kit is predominately red; red jersey, shorts and socks, with accents of black on the jersey.

Concluding the Supplemental Draft, United shortly thereafter began their preseason training, which started with mandatory team physicals for the upcoming MLS season, as well as fitness training. Following players' medical clearances and preliminary training, United went south to Fort Lauderdale, Florida on January 31 to begin their preseason training camp.

=== February ===
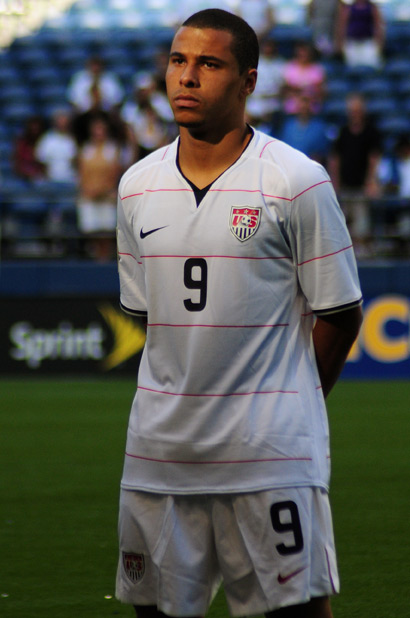
U.S. national team forward Charlie Davies was acquired on loan from Sochaux for the remainder of the year.

During the first week of February, rumors began to circulate that D.C. United was in "serious talks" with FC Sochaux-Montbéliard to acquire U.S. national team forward Charlie Davies on loan from the French Ligue 1 side. Originally declining to comment about a possible loan, Davies' agent, Lyle Yorks, told reporters that Davies was seeking a loan, in order to have more ample playing time while recovering from a series of injuries he suffered in an automobile accident in October 2009. On February 2, D.C. United posted a press release that stated Davies would be training with United during their Fort Lauderdale training camp, for a week starting on February 3. Subsequently, club public relations released a press statement declaring that Davies would join United on loan if they saw him match fit.

On February 16, two weeks following the arrival of Charlie Davies in camp, the club made local and national headlines when they announced that they successfully acquired Davies on a 12-month loan deal from Sochaux. Club management expressed how impressive Davies was in camp. D.C. United have the option of buying out Davies from Sochaux at the end of the season should they decide to do so. United were able to obtain Davies due to their position in the leagues allocation order.

The very next day following Davies official announcement, the club waived long-time defender, Julius James. In the press statement, D.C. cited that the waiving freed another international roster spot on the team's squad. That same day, United also acquired allocation money from L.A. Galaxy when trading the international roster spot vacated with James' departure. James did not make any appearances with the club during preseason training.

During their Florida preseason training, United went undefeated in all matches, winning each match. and Florida International University's men's soccer team. Following training in Florida, United continued their preseason tour by traveling to Southern California, where they played against the PDL's Ventura County Fusion, as well as a match against UC Santa Barbara's men's team. To conclude their California preseason training, United took on fellow MLS club, C.D. Chivas USA in a friendly on February 25. During their time in California, United posted victories against Ventura County as well as UC Santa Barbara, before drawing against Chivas USA.

Concluding the Chivas USA match, the club traveled back east to Charleston, South Carolina to participate in the Carolina Challenge Cup.

=== March ===
The first half of March opened with D.C. United participating in their final preseason tune-up, the 2011 Carolina Challenge Cup, played in Charleston, South Carolina. United, the defending champions, were paired up against the host Charleston Battery in the opening match of the tournament on March 5. In the game, United emerged victorious 2–1, and moved into first place in the tournament table.

Three days later, United played their second MLS opponent of the preseason. This time, they played fellow conference foes, Chicago Fire, for the second match of the Challenge Cup. Played on March 9, the match proved to be another successful game for newly acquired Brettschneider, as he tallied on the scoresheet in the 10th minute of play. Things would continue in United's way in the 37th minute, when Chicago midfielder Diego Cháves was ejected from the game in the 37th minute, allowing United to have a one-man advantage for a significant portion of the match. Consequently, the Fire would fail to create many goalscoring opportunities, being outshot 16–5 by United. Brettschneider's tenth-minute tally was the lone goal of the match, thus giving United a 2–0–0 record in the tournament table, and placing them in a key position to win the entire cup.

Needing a draw at minimum, United were in a keen position to win their second-consecutive Challenge Cup. The club closed out their cup run with their third and final match against last-place Toronto FC; who had fallen to both Chicago and Charleston earlier in the week. The match started out heavily in favor of United, who scored off a Charlie Davies goal in the ninth minute. The 1–0 lead over the Reds was short-lived, as TFC quickly leveled off of a penalty kick scored by TFC captain, Dwayne De Rosario, leveling the match at one-all. Immediately minutes later, the Reds struck again, taking a 2–1 lead. The lead was Toronto's first in the entire tournament and, ironically, United's first time trailing in a match in the entire tournament.

Towards the end of the first half, nearing the halftime break, came an unusual string of reckless challenges from Toronto right back, Mikael Yourassowsky, on loan from Croatian side Rijeka. In the 36th minute of play, Yourassowsky was carded for a reckless challenge on Andy Najar, and a minute later was given a second yellow and subsequently ejected for doing a similarly mistimed tackle on Chris Pontius. It would not be until the 62nd minute that United were able to capitalize on the shorthanded Toronto, restoring parity at 2–2 thanks a goal from Ngwenya. The draw gave D.C. United the cup title.

== Regular season ==
During the Major League Soccer regular season, D.C. United finished with a record of 9–12–12, failing to qualify for the MLS Cup Playoffs for a record fourth-consecutive year.

D.C. United's began the Major League Soccer regular season on March 19, 2011, when the club hosted the Columbus Crew. Though the club earned a 3–1 victory against Columbus, United would only post one more victory throughout March and April, and consequently, fell towards the bottom of both the Eastern Conference and overall standings. Additionally, the chain of losses in April culminated with the club being eliminated during the U.S. Open Cup qualification propers. However, following their 4–1 league loss at Houston Dynamo, United would go unbeaten in their next five matches, winning two games and drawing thrice.

During the summer, with United only losing three matches, and either winning or drawing their other league fixtures, the club ascended in the standings and eventually, into a position that offered a berth into the wildcard round of the playoffs. United held a spot within the league's top ten overall standings throughout July and August. By September, the luck faded as the club ran into a bit of a slump.

The slump continued into September and October, and as the club made up matches in hand, narrow losses ultimately doomed United in reaching the playoffs, as a club hit a five match losing streak. Upon their fourth-straight loss, United was ultimately eliminated from postseason contention with a 1–1 draw against Portland Timbers on October 15.

=== Late March ===
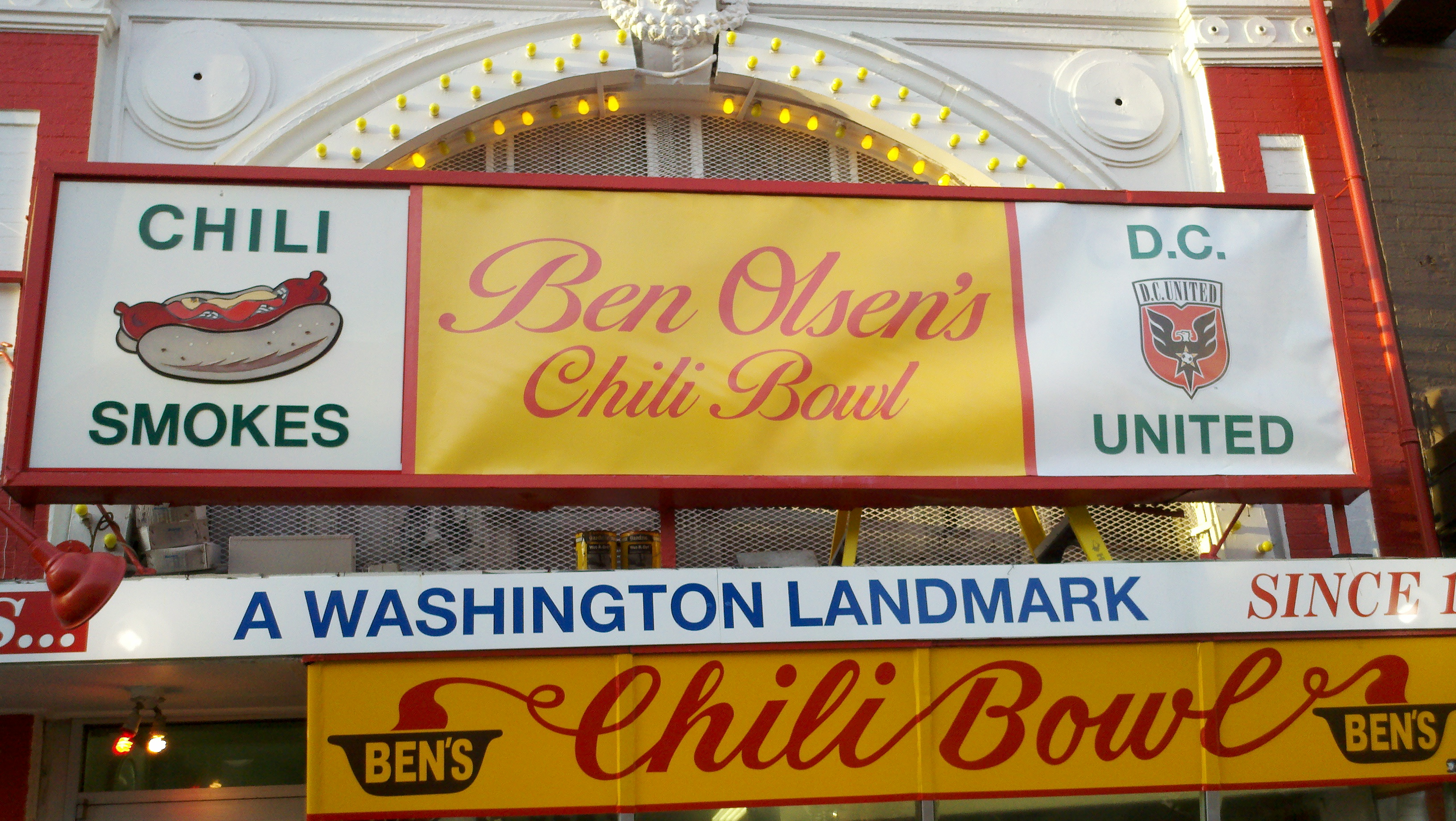
In a promotion for the upcoming season, Ben's Chili Bowl was renamed "Ben Olsen's Chili Bowl" on March 17, 2011

As the Challenge Cup concluded, United began to shift gears to the MLS regular season, and with that, naming their captain for the campaign. On March 16, 2011, Head Coach Ben Olsen named Dax McCarty the club captain.

United opened the MLS regular season on March 19, 2011. Their campaign opened in strong fashion, amassing a 3–1 victory over Eastern Conference foes, Columbus Crew. In the match, two of United's recent acquisitions tallied the three goals on the scoresheet; two for Charlie Davies, who came on as a 55th-minute substitute, and one for Josh Wolff. The goals for Davies were his first since August 12, 2009; when he scored for the U.S. national team in their 1–2 loss against Mexico in Estadio Azteca. The lone blemish for the Black-and-Red that evening was a converted penalty kick by long-time Crew midfielder Robbie Rogers in the 83rd minute.

Following their opening victory, the United traveled up north to take on New England Revolution on March 26. The United would fall into a 2–0 hole early in the match, with some citing poor officiating as the cause. A late penalty kick goal from Charlie Davies resulted in a 2–1 loss for the United.

=== April ===
==== Colorado snowstorm ====
April opened with United playing the defending MLS Cup champions, Colorado Rapids at their home ground, DSG Park on April 2. The match was almost postponed due to snow earlier in the day. However, the match was still called on, as a smaller crowd of around 9,000 braved the wintry conditions. The match saw Colorado take a first half lead off recently purchased Irish-international Caleb Folan. In the 67th minute of play, the United leveled the score thanks to a strike from Santino Quaranta.The tie was short-lived, as the Rapids immediately struck back with a 68th-minute goal from Scottish-international Jamie Smith. Ten minutes later, Folan gave the Rapids a 3–1 lead, and in injury time, Jamaican-international Omar Cummings gave a sucker punch goal, resulting in a 4–1 defeat for United to the Rapids.

By finishing in 16th in MLS last season, United were not guaranteed an MLS berth in the 2011 edition of the U.S. Open Cup. Therefore, they will have to qualify for one of two spots against teams that finished in 7th place or below in MLS last season.

On February 28, 2011, MLS announced that for their qualification, United would play the Philadelphia Union in a play-in game for U.S. Open Cup qualification. The decision for United to play the Union was due to the Union's proximity to United, and their relative record during the 2010 season. The match will be played April 6, 2011, at the Maryland SoccerPlex. United hosts the Union due to winning a coin flip. The winner of the D.C.-Philadelphia match will host New England Revolution in the second phase of MLS qualification. That match is expected to be played in late April 2011.

==== L.A. Galaxy match ====
In front of their largest league crowd in three years, United hosted the Los Angeles Galaxy on April 9. In their previous meeting, the United took a lead midway in the second half, before Galaxy captain, Landon Donovan scored two goals late in the game to give the Galaxy a 2–1 win. The match piqued interest across the region, as a crowd of 26,222 turned up for the game, United's largest league match crowd in over three years. The game itself ended in a 1–1 draw, with the Galaxy scoring the first goal, a Mike Magee header off of a David Beckham corner in the 12th minute. United equalized late into match, in the second minute of stoppage time, thanks to a Charlie Davies penalty kick, his fourth in MLS league play and his fifth with D.C. United.

The match itself swirled around controversy between Abiodun Okulaja's (the center referee) calls and officiating. The most questionable calls were associated the severity of cards distributed to players and a late-match decision to award a penalty kick to the United, in which many claimed was a fake trip in the box. One controversial call came from a reckless challenge by Galaxy midfielder, Beckham, to United forward, Josh Wolff in the 40th minute. Following the referee stopping play to call the foul, a verbal exchange between Beckham and United's Santino Quaranta resulted in a swarm of United and Galaxy players coming in to push the two apart. While Quaranta was not carded for his exchange with Beckham, Beckham was carded for his foul against Wolff in the 37th minute and Davies' penalty kick in the 91st. The goal received much national attention from the controversy surrounding the decision to award a penalty, and Davies' celebration for successfully converting the kick. Subsequent to the match, center referee Abiodun Okulaja ejected Galaxy midfielder Jovan Kirovski for cursing at him while sniping his decision.

==== Success in Toronto ====
On April 16, United took on Toronto FC at Toronto's BMO Field. In the 2010 campaign, United were able to pull out a 1–0 victory against the Reds; this time, D.C. was able to earn a 3–0 victory at Toronto. Their game against Toronto quickly went into good fortune for the Black-and-Red, as United found the back of the net twice within the first 10 minutes of play. The opening goal was scored by Chris Pontius, which was his first in MLS league play since his hat trick against Seattle Sounders FC last June, prior to his calf injury. Pontius netted in the 5th minute as well as the 73rd minute of the match. Additionally, Charlie Davies netted his fifth MLS goal of the year, and his second in the run of play. Davies' goal was a follow-up shot in the 9th minute following a strike from winger Josh Wolff. Additionally, the game saw United not only pull out their first away win of the season, but their first shout-out since the Carolina Challenge Cup; which was also Bill Hamid's first shutout in MLS play.

We put in a good effort and to not get anything is disappointing. We'll put in the video and continue to work, for us it's a process.

— Josh Wolff, D.C. United forward, when asked about United's lack of scoring opportunities in their 4–0 loss to New York.

==== Atlantic Cup drubbing ====
The following Thursday, April 22, United hosted their longtime rivals, Red Bull New York. Broadcast on ESPN2, it was United's first televised match on the network this year. In the 12th minute of play, a Luke Rodgers cross to Red Bulls striker, Thierry Henry led to the first goal for New York. Henry scored his third goal of the season, and the second of the match in the 38th minute of play, doubling New York's lead. Heading into halftime, Olsen replaced club captain, McCarty in for DP, Branko Bošković at halftime. Bošković, praised for his play in the match, had two shots on goal that were deflected off of the crossbar. In the 64th minute, Bošković sent a free kick hurdling towards the upper right post, only to be denied by the crossbar. Throughout a majority of the second half United dominated the Red Bulls in possession, but failed time and time again to score. A counterattack in the 72nd minute, led by Estonian international, Joel Lindpere gave New York a 3–0 advantage over United. Subsequently, Bošković had his third shot on goal deflect off the bar. American prospect, Juan Agudelo netted in injury time for the Red Bulls, giving the club a 4–0 win over United. The loss for United was their worst ever home loss against New York, and their worst loss at home since 2005, when the team lost 4–0 to Chicago Fire in an MLS Cup quarterfinal leg.

Following the club's 4–0 home defeat, United returned to Open Cup play, where they took on New England Revolution in the MLS qualification semifinals. Hosted at Maryland SoccerPlex in Boyds, the Revolution quickly got off to a 2–0 lead, thanks to a pair of goals from Revolution midfielder Kheli Dube. Dube scored in 37th and 47th minutes of play. Twenty minutes following Dube's second goal, Virginia-native Alan Koger gave the Revs a 3–0 lead. Shortly thereafter, United's Branko Bošković scored his first two goals of 2011 to trim the lead down to one goal. The late rally, however, proved to be too little, too late as the Revolution defeated United 3–2. Consequently, it was the first time since 2002 that United did not qualify into the main tournament propers of the Open Cup.

==== Houston defeat, U.S. Open Cup elimination ====
United's woes continued in their final match of April, where they traveled south to take on Houston Dynamo on April 29. United was routed 4–1 in the match, making them have a league-worst 16 goals conceded. However, with 10 goals scored, United was jointly tied for second in the league for goals scored on. The Orange Crush came out on a roaring start, as Dynamo-striker Will Bruin netted in the fourth minute of play. In the 39th minute, United defender Marc Burch scored off a complex free kick that caused the Dynamo defense to scramble, tallying his first goal of 2011. The parity was short-lived, as Bruin would regain the lead for Houston two minutes later off of a header from Brad Davis cross. Bruin would complete his hat trick in the 57th minute to give Dynamo a commanding 3–1 lead. Houston's Cam Weaver came in to add a buffer to the lead in the 62nd minute.

=== May ===
==== Bošković injury ====
It's a nightmare. Branko can't believe it. He's sad and shocked.

— Dejan Drobnjak, Branko Bošković's agent, when finding out about Bošković's torn ACL injury.

During the month of May, D.C. United went undefeated in their four Major League Soccer regular season matches, winning and drawing two games apiece. While the club had success on the field, the team suffered with several injuries, including the club's lone Designated Player, Branko Bošković. Bošković, who left in the team's U.S. Open Cup qualifier loss to New England, was revealed to have a torn Anterior cruciate ligament (ACL) in his right thigh. Towards the end of the month, United hosted defending Dutch champions, Ajax in a friendly match, in which United lost.

Bošković's injury was released publicly on May 1, only three days before their midweek fixture against Seattle Sounders FC. D.C. United, who had never defeated Seattle at home, was coming off a two-match winning streak. The match ended in United's favor, as goals from Josh Wolff and Charlie Davies helped United earn a 2–1 victory. Playing their third match within a week, United hosted 2010 MLS Cup-finalists, FC Dallas on May 7. Like United, Dallas was suffering from a slew of injuries, most notably forward David Ferreira who broke his ankle in Dallas' 2–1 away victory at Vancouver. The game itself ended in a scoreless tie, though United out shot Dallas 5–2 in total shots on frame.

==== Rapids draw, Ajax friendly loss ====
Within a week, United squared off in their return match against the defending league champions, Colorado Rapids. The May 14 affair ended in a 1–1 draw between the two camps as the Rapids' Drew Moor netted a 23rd-minute brace to give the visitors an advantage. The hosts, United, continued to press throughout the match, dominating possession. In the 56th minute, what seemed to be a certain foul in the box for a penalty from Colorado's Jeff Lorentowictz on D.C.'s Joseph Ngwenya was waved off, resulting in heavy dissent from both the players and the bench of United. The incident was seemingly hindered in the 62nd minute when the Rapids' Kosuke Kimura collided with United's Chris Pontius. Pontius would subsequently score from the penalty spot, leveling the scoreline and thus giving United a draw.

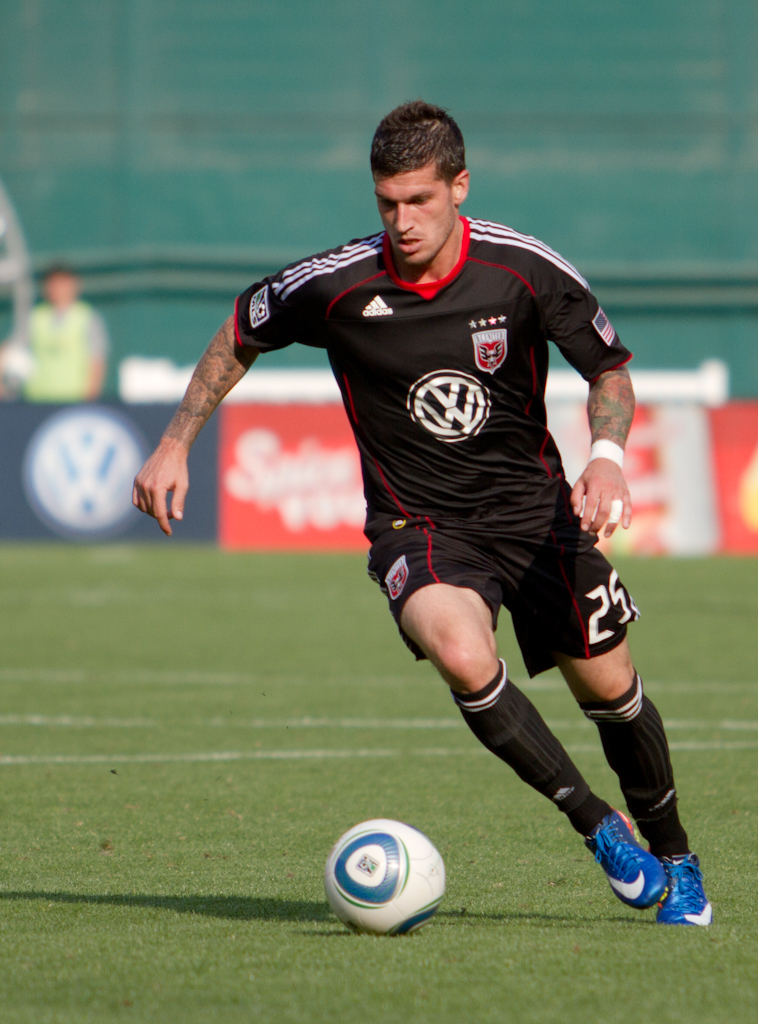
Santino Quaranta dribbling the ball during the international friendly against AFC Ajax

During the week of May 22, United had a bye week from league play, which allowed the club to schedule a home friendly against the defending Dutch champions, AFC Ajax of Amsterdam. The previous week, Ajax had tallied a 3–1 win over Twente to secure the Dutch title for an unprecedented 30th time, their first since 2004. The Amsterdamers notched an early strike in the 10th minute thanks to forward, and Serbian international, Miralem Sulejmani. The Black-and-Red managed to make up for the early setback thanks to a 58th-minute cross from Ngwenya to newly drafted Blake Brettschneider, leveling the match at one apiece. However, the match ended in Ajax's favor over United as the Amsterdammers tallied a final goal in the 87th minute courtesy of midfielder Vurnon Anita.

==== Victory at Jeld-Wen ====
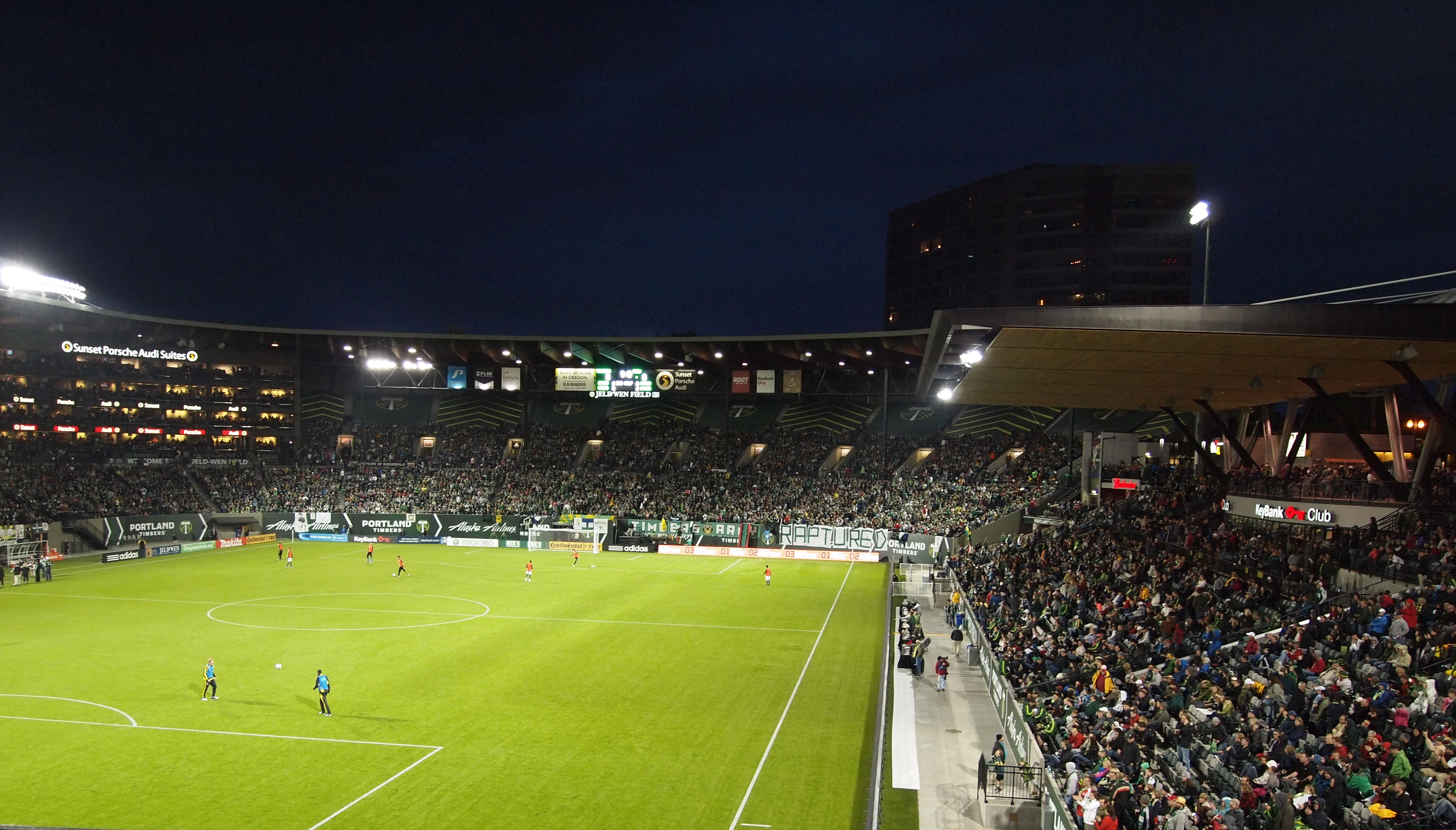
D.C. United became the first MLS side to defeat the MLS Portland Timbers club at Jeld-Wen Field on May 29.

Heading into Memorial Day Weekend, United wrapped up May with the opening match of their two-game West Coast road trip on May 29 at Jeld-Wen Field to take on the Portland Timbers. The Timbers, who held a 5–3–2 record prior to the match had won every single match at home during MLS play. United successfully ended that home streak with a 3–2 victory over the Timbers, thanks to goals from Perry Kitchen, his first professional goal in his career, as well as Chris Pontius and Josh Wolff. In the match, Kitchen opened the scoring for United with a 13th-minute half-volley thanks to a redirected header from Dejan Jakovic. While United were able to hold the 1–0 lead well into the second half of play, a chain of contentious decisions from center official Geoff Gamble, but primarily linesmen Eric Proctor. It was only the second MLS match that Gamble officiated, with his first coming on the previous weekend. In the 67th minute of play, United conceded a penalty kick to the Timbers. United goalkeeper, Bill Hamid initially saved Timbers striker Kenny Cooper's first penalty shot, only for the shot to be retaken. Proctor flagged for a retaking of the kick claiming that Hamid stepping off his line before the kick was taken, an infraction of the rules. The contrasting argument from Hamid, as well as other United players, was that Cooper stutter-stepped before taking the ball, which is illegal in the Laws of the Game. Nevertheless, it was ruled that a second retake would be taken, again by Cooper. Hamid consecutively saved the shot, only for Proctor to again rule that Hamid repeated the same original infraction. The ruling caused Hamid to storm over to Proctor in disdain for his decision, consequently earning Hamid a yellow card for dissent. For the third shot on the mark, Timbers captain Jack Jewsbury took the shot and buried it in the bottom left-hand post, leveling the score at 1–1. The stalemate was tentative, as Diego Chara of the Timbers conceded a penalty in the box when he mistimed a slide tackle on Pontius, leading to a handball. Pontius scored his second penalty of the season, and his second consecutive in league play to give United the 2–1 advantage. A quarter of an hour later, Wolff notched a goal, extending United's lead in the 85th minute. The Timbers' Jorge Perlaza scored a consolation goal in the 88th minute of play, but it would fail to be enough.

=== June ===
==== Third kit debut, L.A. "family affair" ====
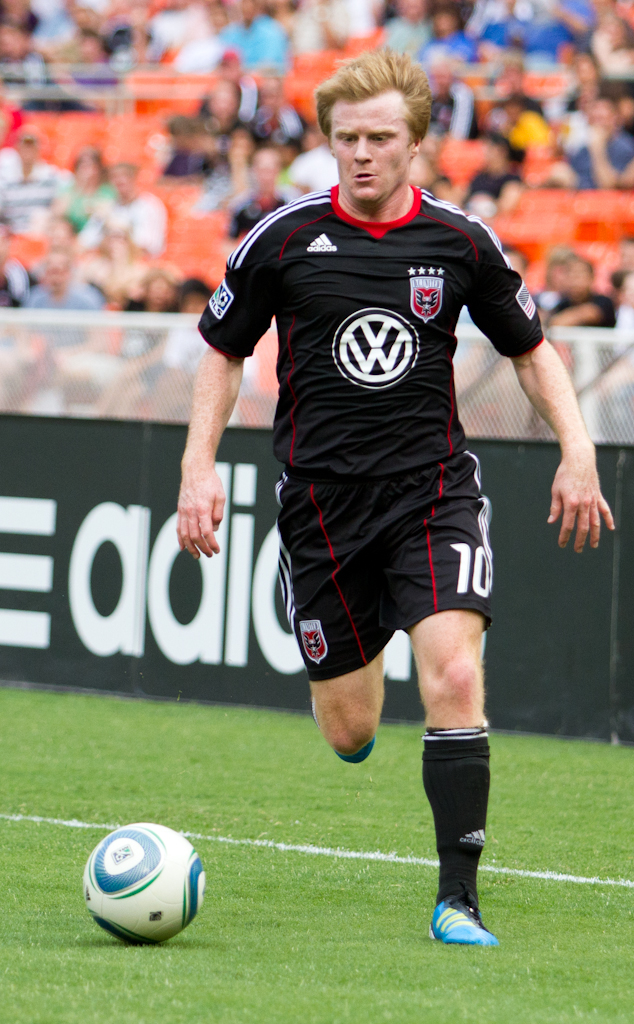
Dax McCarty dribbles the ball during his final match with United on June 25, 2011, against the Houston Dynamo.

The beginning of June was heralded by the debut of United's third kit, which debuted in the opening match of the month. The new third kit, which featured a primary color of red, with black accents debuted in the June 3 away fixture at Los Angeles Galaxy. June also saw a wave of controversy arrive involving Charlie Davies and deceiving match officials during the run of play, causing Davies to be fined by MLS. As the international transfer window neared, United made an unanticipated, blockbuster trade with their Atlantic Cup rivals, New York Red Bulls on June 27. On the pitch, however, United failed to win any matches during the month, tallying three draws and a loss during the month.

The opening match of June was deemed a "family affair" by the media, due to the close relationship between Galaxy manager, Bruce Arena and United manager, Ben Olsen. Beforehand, Arena coached Olsen on the dynasty D.C. United squad of the late 1990s and on the United States national team into the mid-2000s. Continuing their unbeaten streak from May, United earned a 1–1 draw. With the draw, United tentatively moved into third place in the Eastern Conference, ahead of Columbus Crew.

In spite of the strong finish at Los Angeles, who led the Western Conference and overall standings at the time, United failed to win any matches during the month of June, amassing three subsequent draws and a loss. The loss would come the following week on June 11, where they would lose at home against San Jose Earthquakes. Consequently, the loss, along with a Columbus victory, saw United fall to fourth in the conference and 11th in the overall standings.

==== Davies controversy in Salt Lake ====
He just kicked it away and jumped over. It's almost laughable.

— Real Salt Lake defender Chris Wingert, when asked about the controversial foul on Davies.

On June 16, United embarked for Salt Lake City for a June 18 away game at Real Salt Lake. Played at Rio Tinto Stadium, the venue has been considered by fans and media alike to be one of the most hostile environments in MLS and in North American to play in. In franchise history, United had not only failed to win in Rio Tinto, but failed to earn a point in the stadium. In spite of Salt Lake's struggling form, and United's improved form, many still expected Real to defeat United, having the home field advantage and a stronger roster. The June 18 fixture played to a 1–1 tie thanks to penalty kicks from Salt Lake's Fabian Espindola and United's Charlie Davies. The match was marred for its extremely physical, sometimes ruthless play, as well as the lack of discipline imposed by center referee, Terry Vaughn, who only gave one yellow card the entire match. Espindola scored the opening goal in the 38th minute. The penalty was drawn when Salt Lake captain, Kyle Beckerman dribbled within the goal box. As Beckerman dribbled inwards, United's Clyde Simms mistime a slide tackle that missed Beckerman, but resulted in his right wrist deflecting Beckerman's pass into the box. In the second half, United continued to control a majority of the ball position, only to see Chris Pontius's shot deflect off the crossbar in the 53rd minute. Controversy further ignited on what many fans and journalists declared a dive from United's Davies, who drew a penalty kick in the 85th minute, following a breakaway counterattack. The declaration was near universal as video replay and still frames of the incident in the penalty box revealed Davies falling in a diving motion prior to Salt Lake defender, Chris Wingert making any contact with Davies, only to do so once Davies had already fallen down. In spite of this, center official Terry Vaughn whistled it to be a penalty kick. Met with heavy jeers at Rio Tinto, Davies successfully bagged the match tying goal, in spite of the fact that Salt Lake's goalkeeper, a former United player, Nick Rimando, guessed the correct way. In the 92nd minute, during stoppage time, Salt Lake's Jamison Olave recklessly fouled United's Blake Brettschneider to draw a final set piece, possibly to allow United to earn a shocking road win in Salt Lake. However, Najar's free kick was successfully passed to Pontius, whose shot deflected off the crossbar, allowing the match to remain leveled at one apiece. At the match's end heavy boos were ignited by the Salt Lake crowd, primarily directed towards the officiating. The match was deemed as one of the most reckless matches of 2011.

==== Celebrity golf tournament, McCarty–De Rosario trade ====
On June 20, United hosted its annual celebrity tournament. That same day, the club made more headlines when they announced that Fred would be allowed to join Australian A-League side, Melbourne Heart on a summer transfer in July. The exact date was not disclosed, although mid-season transfer window in MLS opens on July 15 and closes August 31.

One week later, United made national headlines following an unexpected trade with their Atlantic Cup rivals, Red Bull New York. The trade, announced on June 27, involved United acquiring New York midfielder, Dwayne De Rosario in exchange for United central midfielder, Dax McCarty.

=== July ===
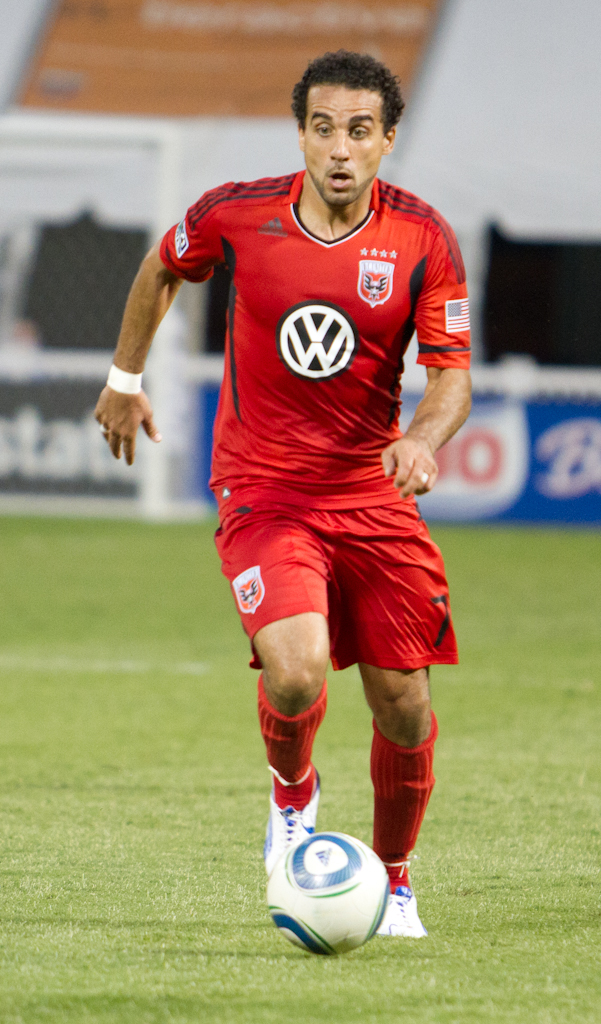
Dwayne De Rosario during his first match with United against the Philadelphia Union

The month of July began with D.C. United announcing a new assistant coach, as well as playing two nearby Eastern Conference rivals. On July 1, the franchise announced that Dutch manager Sonny Silooy was hired as an assistant coach for the senior team. Three days later, United played budding rivals, Philadelphia Union at home. The match, ending in a 2–2 tie saw newcomer Dwayne De Rosario make an assist to Josh Wolff as well as midfielder Andy Najar score a long range volley from 35 yards.

==== Victory in New York, Atlantic Cup defeat ====
The following week, United traveled up the Interstate 95 corridor to take on their Atlantic Cup rivals, Red Bull New York. The Red Bulls, previously thrashed United 4–0 in April, and looked to be heavy favorites by fans and the media alike, especially coming off a 5–0 home win over Toronto. During the 61st minute of play, De Rosario scored against his former club to give United a 1–0 advantage, which ended up being the match-winning goal. The win means that the Red Bulls have failed to defeat United at home since 2008. In spite of the win, United failed to win the Atlantic Cup trophy for the second consecutive year, losing 4–1 on aggregate. However, despite winning the Cup for the second straight year, Red Bulls players found the consolation prize as nothing worth meriting about. D.C. continued their streak the following week, drawing 0–0 to FC Dallas at Pizza Hut Park.

United concluded July with a 2–0 victory over the San Jose Earthquakes at Buck Shaw Stadium. De Rosario scored both goals.

=== August ===
The fifth month into D.C. United's regular season campaign marked the return of several players whom were previously injured throughout the season. Some key players included Dejan Jakovic, Kurt Morsink and Santino Quaranta. On the field, D.C. United was scheduled to host Canada's two MLS franchises, Toronto FC and Vancouver Whitecaps FC, respectively. While recent United acquisition, and former Toronto captain, Dwayne De Rosario scored a hat trick against his former club, a shorthanded United ended up drawing 3–3 against Toronto. The following weekend, United posted a 4–0 thrashing of last-place Vancouver, earning their largest home victory since 2008.

Upon their homestance against the Canadian teams, United hit the road for matches at Eastern Conference rivals, Chicago Fire and Sporting Kansas City. A lone goal in the 73rd minute from United's Josh Wolff gave the team a point against Chicago, while an early goal from Sporting's Omar Bravo consequently ended in a 1–0 defeat against Kansas City, making it the first time since April 27 that United lost on the road.

Originally, United was expecting to conclude their competitive play on August 27, at home to the Portland Timbers, but due to the effects of Hurricane Irene, the match was rescheduled from 7:30 pm to 2:30 pm. Two days prior to the match itself, the club and the MLS League Committee agreed to postpone the match to a later date. It was later confirmed that the match would be played in October.

=== September ===
With the Portland match being postponed, it resulted in a three-week span of no competitive play for D.C. United. To give his players some additional rest and to ease the tensions in training sessions, head coach Ben Olsen granted the players and staff a four-week break over Labor Day Weekend. On September 6, United players and staff rejoined one another in training, four days ahead of their trip to Los Angeles for their road fixture against Chivas USA. The September 10 match led to a 3–0 victory for United, earning their largest road victory since April. Charlie Davies netted a hat trick, scoring thrice in the run of play, each goal coming off of an assist from Chris Pontius. However, the large victory paid a devastating price, as Pontius collided with ??? in the 83rd minute, breaking his leg, and consequently missing the remainder of the season. The road swing concluded with a 3–0 loss to Seattle Sounders.

Following the defeat to Seattle, United had a two-match homestand against 2005 expansion teams, Chivas USA and Real Salt Lake. Against Chivas USA, United went up 2–0 before conceding twice to settle for a 2–2 draw. Against Real Salt Lake, Dwayne De Rosario netted a hat trick in the match within the first 31 minutes, scoring the fastest hat trick in MLS history, earning him Player of the Week honors. In addition to De Rosario's three goals, he assisted to Andy Najar, and the club won 4–1 over Salt Lake.

The month of competitive matches ended on September 29 with a trip to their budding I-95 rivals, Philadelphia Union, where United lost 3–2.

=== October ===
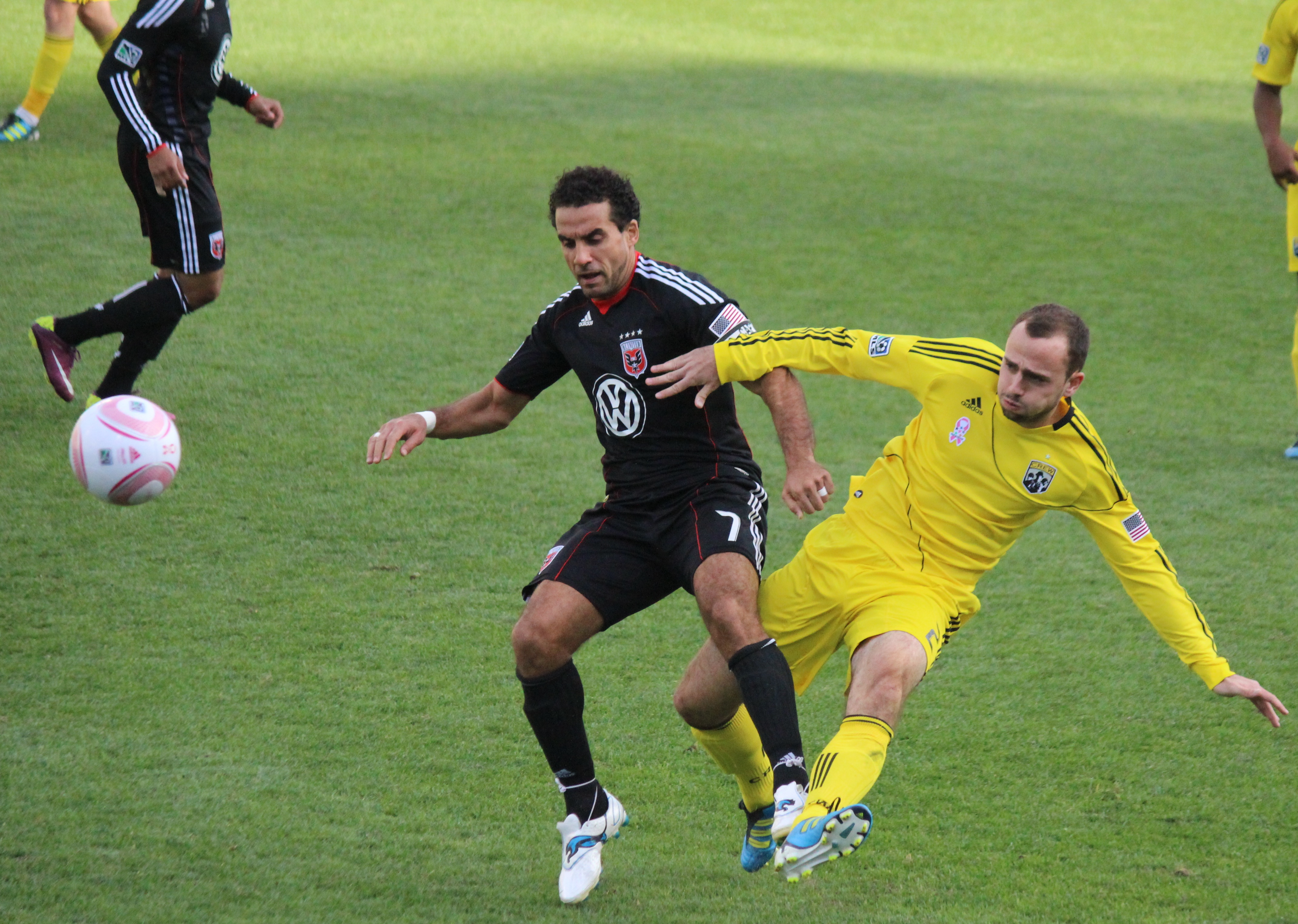
Rich Balchan challenging Dwayne De Rosario at Columbus Crew Stadium

Entering the final month of the regular season, the race for the 2011 MLS Cup Playoffs began to heat up. In their away fixture at Columbus Crew, United lost 1–2, with United's Daniel Woolard scoring the lone goal for the club. It was the first time since April 29 that the team lost consecutive matches. Consequently, the club remained outside of the playoff race. United in need of points, lost their third-straight match on the road to Vancouver Whitecaps FC, 2–1.

On October 15, United lost their fourth-consecutive match, making it their longest losing streak since August 2010. Playing Chicago, United took a 1–0 lead in the 90th minute thanks to a penalty kick from De Rosario. The slight goal lead seemed certain to return United back into a playoff position for only Chicago's Sebastián Grazzini and Diego Cháves to score for the Fire in the third and fifth minutes of stoppage time, respectively. Despite the loss, United barely remained in the playoff chance. On October 19, United hosted the Portland Timbers. With the match ending in a 1–1 draw, United failed to qualify for the playoffs for a team-record fourth-consecutive season. United concluded the regular season on October 22 with a 0–1 home loss to Sporting Kansas City.

== Competitions ==
Key

Win Draw Loss

=== Preseason ===
February 5 Scrimmage	Black	0–2	Red	Fort Lauderdale, FL
12:00 EDT		Report	5' Barklage; 8' Bošković	Stadium: Fort Lauderdale Stadium; Attendance: 40

February 7 Scrimmage	D.C. United	5–1	Canada U-20	Fort Lauderdale, FL
11:00 EDT	Ngwenya 4', 8', 21'; Davies 41'; Najar 51'	Report	70' Pennycooke	Stadium: Fort Lauderdale Stadium; Attendance: 684

February 9 Scrimmage	FIU Golden Panthers	0–4	D.C. United	Fort Lauderdale, FL
16:00 EDT		Report	10' King; 15' Yang; 31' Barklage; 53' Bošković	Stadium: Fort Lauderdale Stadium; Attendance: 702

February 12 Scrimmage	Trinidad and Tobago U-20	0–4	D.C. United	Fort Lauderdale, FL
09:30 EDT		Report	33' Ngwenya; 68' Morsink; 69', 75' Davies	Stadium: Lockhart Stadium; Attendance: 613

February 20 Friendly	Ventura County Fusion	1–3	D.C. United	Ventura, CA
13:30 EDT	Avesian 67'	Report	(red card) 25' Wolff; 67', 73' Brettschneider; 87' Villarreal	Stadium: Bulldog Stadium; Attendance: 217

February 22 Friendly	UC Santa Barbara Gauchos	0–1	D.C. United	Santa Barbara, CA
22:30 EDT		Report	81' Brettschneider	Stadium: Harder Stadium; Attendance: 600

February 25 Friendly	Chivas USA	0–0	D.C. United	Carson, CA
15:00 EDT		Report		Stadium: The Home Depot Center

=== Carolina Challenge Cup ===
March 5	Charleston Battery	1–2	D.C. United	Charleston, SC
19:15 EDT	Armstrong 15' (pen.)	Report	4' Pontius; 71' Wolff	Stadium: Blackbaud Stadium

March 9	D.C. United	1–0	Chicago Fire	Charleston, SC
16:00 EDT	Brettschneider 10'; Davies (yellow card) 34'; Shanosky (yellow card) 76'; Brasesco (yellow card) 89'	Report	(red card) 37' Cháves	Stadium: Blackbaud Stadium; Referee: Juan Calos Rivera

March 12	Toronto FC	2–2	D.C. United	Charleston, SC
17:15 EDT	De Rosario 19' (pen.); Santos 28'; Yourassowsky (yellow card) 36' (yellow-red card) 37'	Final, Post-Match	12' Davies; 62' Ngwenya	Stadium: Blackbaud Stadium

=== Major League Soccer ===
==== Matches ====
March 19, 2011 1	D.C. United	3–1	Columbus	Washington, D.C. USA
19:30 EDT	Burch (yellow card) 38'; Wolff 51' (yellow card) 52'; Davies 63' (pen.) 76'	Report	(yellow card) 16' Duka; 82' (pen.) Rogers	Stadium: RFK Stadium; Attendance: 18,402; Referee: Mark Geiger (New Jersey)

March 26, 2011 2	New England	2–1	D.C. United	Foxboro, Massachusetts
16:30 EDT	Schilawski 7'; Joseph 17' (pen.) (yellow card) 37'	Report	(yellow card) 16' Onstad; (yellow card) 40' Morsink; (yellow card) 51' Najar; (yellow card) 68' Fred; 91+' (pen.) Davies; (red card) 93+' Jakovic	Stadium: Gillette Stadium; Attendance: 12,914; Referee: Baldomero Toledo (Texas)

April 3, 2011 3	Colorado	3–1	D.C. United	Commerce City, Colorado
19:00 EDT	Casey (yellow card) 16'; Folan 38'; Smith 71'; Cummings 90+'	Report	(yellow card) 41' McCarty; 70' Quaranta; (yellow card) 83' Burch	Stadium: DSG Park; Attendance: 9,857; Referee: Elias Bazakos (Minnesota)

April 9, 2011 4	D.C. United	1–1	Los Angeles	Washington, D.C. USA
19:30 EDT	Quaranta (yellow card) 39' (yellow-red card) 84'; Davies 91+' (pen.)	Report	12' Magee; (yellow card) 27' Dunivant; (yellow card) 41' Beckham (red card) (post-match) Kirovski	Stadium: RFK Stadium; Attendance: 26,622; Referee: Abiodun Okulaja (New York)

April 16, 2011 5	Toronto	0–3	D.C. United	Toronto, Ontario Canada
16:00 EDT	Harden (red card) 49'; Gargan (yellow card) 88'	Report	5' (yellow card) 42' (goal) 73' Pontius; 10' Davies	Stadium: BMO Field; Attendance: 16,313; Referee: Mark Kadlecik (Oklahoma)

April 21, 2011 6	D.C. United	0–4	New York	Washington, D.C. USA
20:00 EDT		Report	12', 38' Henry; 76' Lindpere; 92+' Agudelo	Stadium: RFK Stadium; Attendance: 18,052; Referee: Jorge Gonzalez

April 29, 2011 7	Houston	4–1	D.C. United	Houston, Texas USA
18:30 EDT	Bruin 4', 41', 57'; Weaver 62'		39' Burch	Stadium: Robertson Stadium

May 4, 2011 8	D.C. United	2–1	Seattle	Washington, D.C. USA
19:30 EDT	White (yellow card) 13'; Wolff 31'; Davies (yellow card) 35' (goal) 52'	Report	(yellow card) 58' Jaqua; 71' (pen.) Evans	Stadium: RFK Stadium; Attendance: 11,254; Referee: Hilario Grajeda

May 7, 2011 9	D.C. United	0–0	Dallas	Washington, D.C. USA
19:30 EDT	Fred (yellow card) 82'	Report	(yellow card) 59' John	Stadium: RFK Stadium; Attendance: 11,504; Referee: Baldomero Toledo

May 14, 2011 10	D.C. United	1–1	Colorado	Washington, D.C. USA
19:30 EDT	Pontius 62' (pen.)	Report	23' (yellow card) 46' Moor; (yellow card) 92+' Pickens	Stadium: RFK Stadium; Attendance: 12,500; Referee: Terry Vaughn (Iowa)

May 29, 2011 11	Portland	2–3	D.C. United	Portland, Oregon
17:00 EDT	Jewsbury 67' (pen.); Perlaza 88'	Report	12' Kitchen; (yellow card) 57' Jakovic; (yellow card) 67' Hamid; 75' (pen.) Pontius; 85' Wolff	Stadium: Jeld-Wen Field; Attendance: 18,627; Referee: Geoff Gamble (New York)

June 3, 2011 12	Los Angeles	0–0	D.C. United	Carson, California
23:00 EDT	Gonzalez (yellow card) 42'	Report	(yellow card) 65' White	Stadium: The Home Depot Center; Attendance: 20,036; Referee: Silviu Petrescu (Ontario)

June 11, 2011 13	D.C. United	2–4	San Jose	Washington, D.C. USA
19:30 EDT		Report		Stadium: RFK Stadium; Attendance: 14,105; Referee: Andrew Chapin (Illinois)

June 18, 2011 14	Real Salt Lake	1–1	D.C. United	Sandy, Utah
21:00 EDT	Espindola 38' (pen.)	Report	(yellow card) 65' Brettschneider; 85' (pen.) Davies	Stadium: Rio Tinto Stadium; Attendance: 16,841; Referee: Terry Vaughn

June 25, 2011 15	D.C. United	2–2	Houston	Washington, D.C. USA
20:00 EDT	Pontius 31'; Davies 73'; Pontius (yellow card) 90+5'	Report	41' (pen.) Davis; (yellow card) 74' Sarkodie; 88' (o.g.) White; (yellow card) 90+4' Cruz	Stadium: RFK Stadium; Attendance: 15,734; Referee: Mark Kadlecik

July 2, 2011 16	D.C. United	2–2	Philadelphia	Washington, D.C. USA
19:00 EDT	Wolff 44'; Najar 58'	Report	(yellow card) 16' Harvey; 49' (o.g.) Kitchen; 84' Ruiz	Stadium: RFK Stadium; Attendance: 13,365; Referee: Abiodun Okulaja

July 9, 2011 17	New York	0–1	D.C. United	Harrison, New Jersey
19:30 EDT	Richards (yellow card) 82'; Miller (yellow card) 85'	Report	61' De Rosario; (yellow card) 85' Davies	Stadium: Red Bull Arena; Attendance: 22,200; Referee: Jair Marrufo

July 16, 2011 18	Dallas	0–0	D.C. United	Frisco, Texas
20:30 EDT	Hernández (yellow card) 58'	Report	(yellow card) 26' White	Stadium: Pizza Hut Park; Attendance: 10,802; Referee: Niko Bratsis

July 20, 2011 19	D.C. United	0–1	New England	Washington, D.C. USA
19:30 EDT				Stadium: RFK Stadium; Attendance: 16,597; Referee: Michael Kennedy

July 30, 2011 20	San Jose	0–2	D.C. United	San Jose, California
21:30 EDT	Gordon (yellow card) 37'	Final, Post Match	57', 67' De Rosario; (red card) 70' Najar; (yellow card) 79' da Luz	Stadium: Buck Shaw Stadium; Attendance: 10,525; Referee: Mark Kadlecik

August 6, 2011 21	D.C. United	3–3	Toronto	Washington, D.C. USA
19:30 EDT	Hamid (red card) 7'; De Rosario 19', 64', 87' (yellow card) 79'	Report	52' Marošević; 69' de Guzman; 87' Koevermans	Stadium: RFK Stadium; Attendance: 11,684; Referee: Jasen Anno

August 13, 2011 22	D.C. United	4–0	Vancouver	Washington, D.C. USA
19:30 EDT	McDonald (yellow card) 39'; Pontius 45+2', 70'; Najar 47'; Davies (yellow card) 60'; King 81'	Report	(yellow card) 15' Camilio; (yellow card) 45+1' Boxall	Stadium: RFK Stadium; Attendance: 11,738; Referee: Hilario Grajeda

August 18, 2011 23	Chicago	1–1	D.C. United	Bridgeview, Illinois
21:00 EDT				Stadium: Toyota Park; Referee: Ricardo Salazar

August 21, 2011 24	Sporting K.C.	1–0	D.C. United	Kansas City, Kansas
19:00 EDT	Kamara 19'	Report	Kitchen (yellow card) 35'; Quaranta (yellow card) 54'	Stadium: Livestrong Sporting Park; Attendance: 15,352; Referee: Alex Prus

September 10, 2011 25	Chivas USA	0–3	D.C. United	Carson, California
22:30 EDT		Report	11', 14', 66' Davies	Stadium: The Home Depot Center; Attendance: 12,245; Referee: Ricardo Salazar

September 17, 2011 26	Seattle	3–0	D.C. United	Seattle, Washington USA
21:00 EDT	Fucito 35'; Wahl (yellow card) 41'; Fernández 47+', 60'	Report	(yellow card) 16' Ngwenya; (yellow card) 63' da Luz	Stadium: Qwest Field; Attendance: 36,242; Referee: Kevin Stott

September 21, 2011 27	D.C. United	2–2	Chivas USA	Washington, D.C. USA
19:30 EDT	McDonald (yellow card) 16'; De Rosario 39'; White 47'	Report	(yellow card) 30' Zemanski; (yellow card) 46' Umaña; 57', 70' Ángel	Stadium: RFK Stadium; Attendance: 14,849; Referee: Chris Penso

September 24, 2011 28	D.C. United	4–1	Real Salt Lake	Washington, D.C. USA
21:30 EDT	Najar 13'; De Rosario 22', 27', 31'	Report	(yellow card) 59' Warner; 85' Saborio	Stadium: RFK Stadium; Attendance: 16,367; Referee: Edvin Jurisevic

September 29, 2011 29	Philadelphia	3–2	D.C. United	Chester, Pennsylvania
22:00 EDT	Le Toux 4', 15'; Farfan 57'	Report	22' De Rosario; 30' Najar; (yellow card) 39' Kitchen; (yellow card) 71' McDonald	Stadium: PPL Park; Referee: Ricardo Salazar

October 2, 2011 30	Columbus	2–1	D.C. United	Columbus, Ohio
16:00 EDT		Report		Stadium: Crew Stadium; Attendance: 15,566; Referee: Baldomero Toledo

October 12, 2011 31	Vancouver	2–1	D.C. United	Vancouver, British Columbia Canada
22:30 EDT				Stadium: BC Place; Attendance: 17,289

October 15, 2011 32	D.C. United	1–2	Chicago	Washington, D.C. USA
19:30 EDT	Najar (yellow card) 76'; De Rosario 90' (pen.)	Report	(yellow card) 46' Mikulic; (yellow card) 78' Barouch; 90+3' Grazzini; 90+5' Chaves	Stadium: RFK Stadium; Attendance: 16,548; Referee: Jorge Gonzalez

October 19, 2011 33	D.C. United	1–1	Portland	Washington, D.C. USA
20:00 EDT		Report		Stadium: RFK Stadium; Attendance: 14,307; Referee: Jair Marrufo
Note: Match originally scheduled to kickoff on August 27 at 19:00 (7:00 pm), but postponed due to Hurricane Irene.

October 22, 2011 34	D.C. United	0–1	Sporting K.C.	Washington, D.C. USA
19:30 EDT		Report	54' Besler	Stadium: RFK Stadium; Attendance: 17,965; Referee: Alex Prus

=== MLS Reserve League ===
March 20, 2011 MLS Reserve Division	D.C. United	3–2	Columbus Crew	RFK Stadium Auxiliary Fields
	Brasesco 3'; Brettschneider 39'; Willis (substituted off) Hamid (substituted on) 46'; Brasesco (substituted off) King (substituted on) 46'; Bošković 49'; Morsink (substituted off) Shanosky (substituted on) 59'; Quaranta (substituted off) Bekele (substituted on) 70'; Fred (yellow card) 72'; Bošković (substituted off) Albrecht (substituted on) 79'	DCUnited.com	8' Anor; (substituted off) 46' Rogers (substituted on) Grossman; (substituted off) 54' Heinemann (substituted on) Adlard; 63' Grossman; (substituted off) 87' Burners (substituted on) Gehrig	Attendance: 52

March 26, 2011 MLS Reserve Division	New England Revolution	1–4	D.C. United	Gillette Stadium
	Stolica 1'; Sinovic (yellow card) 21'; Dube (substituted off) Fagundez (substituted on) 24'; Cochrane (substituted off) Kabal (substituted on) 46'; Kinne (substituted off) Machado (substituted on) 84'	ReevolutionSoccer.net	18' Bošković; 34', 43' Brettschneider; (substituted off) 46' Fred (substituted on) Albrecht; 69' Salandy-Defour

May 16, 2011 MLS Reserve Division	Philadelphia Union	0–1	D.C. United	Chester Park
	Paunović (yellow card) 22'; Nakazawa (yellow card) 45'; McInerney (substituted off) McLaughlin (substituted on) 46'; Daniel (substituted off) M. Gonzalez (substituted on) 66'; Paunović (substituted off) Torres (substituted on) 73'	DCUnited.com	(substituted off) 24' Morsink (substituted on) Martin; 43' Barklage; (yellow card) 52' Fred; (yellow card) 61' Korb; (substituted off) 82' Etchita (substituted on) Rudy; (yellow card) 88' Brettschneider

June 7, 2011 MLS Reserve Division	D.C. United	2–2	New England Revolution	RFK Auxiliary Fields
	Davies (substituted off) Carreiro (substituted on) 42'; Cronin (substituted off) Willis (substituted on) 46'; Zayner (substituted off) McCarty (substituted on) 46'; Albrecht (yellow card) 52'; Albrecht (substituted on) Martin (substituted on) 58'; Shanosky (substituted off) Rudy (substituted on) 66'; Ngwenya 69'; Martin 82'	D.C. United	28' (pen.) 65' Mansally; (substituted off) 46' Murray (substituted on) Shuttleworth; (substituted off) 46' Nyassi (substituted on) Fagundez; (substituted off) 46' Phelan (substituted on) Sousa; (substituted off) 84' Mansally (substituted on) Augustine	Attendance: 52

July 3, 2011 MLS Reserve Division	D.C. United	4–1	Philadelphia Union	RFK Auxiliary Fields
	King 22' (yellow card) 41'; Morsink 23' (yellow card) 78'; Ngwenya 69' (pen.) 79' (yellow card) 76' (yellow-red card) 88'	DCUnited.com	(yellow card) 26' Ackley; 48' Madison; (yellow card) 76' Farfan	Attendance: 128

August 7, 2011 MLS Reserve Division	D.C. United	2–1	Toronto FC	RFK Stadium Auxiliary Fields
	Davies 58'; Burch 80'	DCUnited.com	77' Vuković

October 2, 2011 MLS Reserve Division	Columbus Crew	—	D.C. United	Columbus Crew Stadium

October 6, 2011 MLS Reserve Division	New York Red Bulls	1–1	D.C. United	Montclair State University
		NewYorkRedBulls.com

November 11, 2011 MLS Reserve Division	D.C. United	v	New York Red Bulls	RFK Auxiliary Fields

=== U.S. Open Cup ===
April 6, 2011 QR1	Philadelphia (Pennsylvania)	2–2 (a.e.t.) (2–4 p)	(Washington, D.C.) D.C. United	Boyds, Maryland
19:30 EDT	Ruiz 18'; Ruiz (yellow card) 73'; Valdes (yellow card) 39' (yellow-red card) 86'; Nowak (red card) 118'; Carroll 118'	Report	(yellow card) 25' Fred; 45' Wolff; (yellow card) 70' Jaković; 111' Woolard	Stadium: Maryland SoccerPlex; Attendance: 2,347; Referee: Andrew Chapin
	Penalties
	Le Toux (penalty scored); McInerney (penalty missed); Torres (penalty missed); Nakazawa (penalty scored)		(penalty scored) Pontius; (penalty scored) Barklage; (penalty scored) Najar; (penalty scored) Bošković

April 26, 2011 QR2	New England (Massachusetts)	3–2	(Washington, D.C.) D.C. United	Boyds, Maryland
19:30 EDT	Dube 37', 47'; Koger 67'	Report	73', 83' Bošković	Stadium: Maryland SoccerPlex; Attendance: 1,802; Referee: Juan Carlos Rivero

=== Mid-season exhibitions ===
May 22, 2011	D.C. United (United States)	1–2	(Netherlands) Ajax	Washington, D.C.
19:30 EDT	Brettschneider 58'	Report	10' Sulejmani; (yellow card) 69' Ebecilio; 87' Anita	Stadium: RFK Stadium; Attendance: 10,278; Referee: Mark Geiger

July 23, 2011	D.C. United (United States)	1–3	(England) Everton	Washington, D.C.
19:30 EDT	Pontius 47'	Report (D.C.); Report (Everton)	4' Anichebe; 16' Bilyaletdinov; (yellow card) 27' Cahill; 87' Gueye	Stadium: RFK Stadium; Attendance: 12,789

== Club information ==
=== Roster ===
As of August 3, 2011.

No.	Name	Nationality	Position	Date of birth (age)	Signed From
Goalkeepers
1	Steve Cronin	(United States)	GK	May 28, 1983 (aged 27)	(United States) Portland
28	Bill Hamid	(United States)	GK	November 25, 1990 (aged 20)	The academy
31	Joe Willis	(United States)	GK	August 10, 1988 (aged 22)	(United States) University of Denver
Defenders
2	Brandon McDonald	(United States)	CB	January 16, 1986 (aged 25)	(United States) San Jose Earthquakes
4	Marc Burch	(United States)	LB	May 7, 1984 (aged 26)	(United States) Columbus Crew
5	Dejan Jakovic	(Canada)	CB	July 16, 1985 (aged 25)	(Serbia) Red Star
12	Jed Zayner	(United States)	RB	December 13, 1984 (aged 26)	(United States) Columbus Crew
15	Ethan White	(United States)	CB	January 1, 1991 (aged 20)	(United States) University of Maryland
18	Devon McTavish	(United States)	RB	August 8, 1984 (aged 26)	(United States) West Virginia University
21	Daniel Woolard	(United States)	LB	May 22, 1984 (aged 26)	(United States) Carolina RailHawks
22	Chris Korb	(United States)	RB/LB	October 8, 1987 (aged 23)	(United States) Akron University
23	Perry Kitchen	(United States)	CB/RB	February 29, 1992 (aged 19)	(United States) Akron University
Midfielders
3	Austin da Luz	(United States)	LM	October 9, 1987 (aged 23)	(United States) New York Red Bulls
6	Kurt Morsink	(United States)	DM	June 27, 1984 (aged 26)	(United States) Sporting Kansas City
20	Stephen King	(United States)	AM	March 6, 1986 (aged 25)	(United States) Seattle Sounders FC
8	Branko Bošković	(Montenegro)	AM	June 21, 1980 (aged 30)	(Austria) Rapid Wien
14	Andy Najar	(Honduras)	RM/AM	March 16, 1993 (aged 18)	The academy
17	Conor Shanosky	(United States)	CM/DM	December 13, 1991 (aged 19)	The academy
19	Clyde Simms	(United States)	CM	August 21, 1982 (aged 28)	(United States) Richmond Kickers
24	Brandon Barklage	(United States)	RM	November 2, 1986 (aged 24)	(United States) Saint Louis University
25	Santino Quaranta	(United States)	RM	October 14, 1984 (aged 26)	(United States) New York Red Bulls
Forwards
9	Charlie Davies	(United States)	ST	June 25, 1986 (aged 24)	(France) Sochaux (on loan through December 31, 2011)
11	Joseph Ngwenya	(Zimbabwe)	ST	March 30, 1981 (aged 29)	(United States) Houston Dynamo
13	Chris Pontius	(United States)	ST/LW	May 12, 1987 (aged 23)	(United States) UC Santa Barbara
16	Josh Wolff	(United States)	ST	February 25, 1977 (aged 34)	(United States) Sporting Kansas City
29	Blake Brettschneider	(United States)	ST	April 11, 1989 (aged 21)	(United States) University of South Carolina
7	Dwayne De Rosario	(Canada)	ST/AM	May 15, 1978 (aged 32)	(United States) New York Red Bulls

=== Coaching staff ===
Position	Staff
Head Coach	(United States) Ben Olsen
Asst. Coach	(United States) Chad Ashton
Asst. Coach	(Netherlands) Sonny Silooy
Asst. Coach & Goalkeeping Coach	(Canada) Pat Onstad
General Manager	(United States) Dave Kasper
Special Projects Manager	(United States) Bryan Namoff
Team Administrator	(Peru) Francisco Tobar
Equipment Manager	(United States) David Brauzer
Head Athletic Trainer	(United States) Brian Goodstein
Asst. Athletic Trainer / Asst. Strength Coach	(Canada) Pete Calabrese
Assistant, Team Operations	(Costa Rica) Steve Olivarez
Physical Therapist	(Bolivia) Gabriel Manoel
Asst. Equipment Manager	(England) Tim Hall

Last updated: August 3, 2011
Source: D.C. United Official Website

=== International players ===
The following players on the club have received international call-ups during the season or within the previous year:

Nation	Player	Position	Last call-up
Canada	Dwayne De Rosario	MF	v. Panama; June 14, 2011
Canada	Dejan Jakovic	DF	v. Ecuador; June 1, 2011
Montenegro	Branko Bošković	MF	v. England; October 12, 2010
Honduras	Andy Najar	MF	v. Colombia; September 3, 2011
United States	Bill Hamid	GK	v. Costa Rica; September 2, 2011
United States	Chris Pontius	FW	v. Costa Rica; September 2, 2011
United States	Josh Wolff	FW	v. Chile; January 22, 2011
United States U-20	Perry Kitchen	DF	v. Guatemala U-20

== Standings ==
Team		GP	W	D	L	GF	GA	GD	Pts
1	Los Angeles Galaxy	34	19	10	5	48	28	+20	67
2	Seattle Sounders FC	34	18	9	7	56	37	+19	63
3	Real Salt Lake	34	15	8	11	44	36	+8	53
4	FC Dallas	34	15	7	12	42	39	+3	52
5	Sporting Kansas City	34	13	12	9	50	40	+10	51
6	Colorado Rapids	34	12	13	9	44	41	+3	49
7	Houston Dynamo	34	12	13	9	45	41	+4	49
8	Philadelphia Union	34	11	15	8	44	36	+8	48
9	Columbus Crew	34	13	8	13	43	44	−4	47
10	New York Red Bulls	34	10	16	8	50	44	+6	46
11	Chicago Fire	34	9	16	9	46	15	+1	43
12	Portland Timbers	34	11	9	14	40	48	−8	42
13	D.C. United	34	9	12	13	49	52	−3	39
14	San Jose Earthquakes	34	8	14	12	40	45	−5	38
15	Chivas USA	34	8	12	14	41	43	−2	36
16	Toronto FC	34	6	15	13	36	59	−23	33
17	New England Revolution	34	5	13	16	38	58	−20	28
18	Vancouver Whitecaps FC	34	6	10	18	35	55	−20	28

Supporters' Shield winners, qualified for the 2012–13 CONCACAF Champions League and the 2011 MLS Cup Playoffs
Qualified for 2012–13 CONCACAF Champions League and the 2011 MLS Cup Playoffs
Qualified for the 2011 MLS Cup Playoffs
Qualified for the 2012–13 CONCACAF Champions League
Last updated: 16:57, December 17, 2011 (UTC)

=== Results summary ===
Overall								Home						Away					
Pld	W	D	L	GF	GA	GD	Pts	W	D	L	GF	GA	GD	W	D	L	GF	GA	GD
28	9	11	8	43	41	+2	38	4	7	3	26	22	+4	5	4	5	17	19	−2

Last updated: September 25, 2011.
Source: MLSSoccer.com

=== Results by round ===
Round	1	2	3	4	5	6	7	8	9	10	11	12	13	14	15	16	17	18	19	20	21	22	23	24	25	26	27	28	29	30	31	32	33	34
Stadium	H	A	A	H	A	H	A	H	H	H	A	A	H	A	H	H	A	A	H	A	H	H	A	A	A	A	H	H	A	A	A	H	H	H
Result	W	L	L	D	W	L	L	W	D	D	W	D	L	D	D	D	W	D	L	W	D	W	D	L	W	L	D	W	L	L	L	L	D	L
Conference	1	5	8	9	5	5	7	5	5	6	3	3	4	3	5	5	4	4	6	5	5	4	3	5	4	5	4	4	5	5	6	6	6	7
Overall	2	8	13	15	8	9	14	11	12	14	8	10	12	12	11	11	9	9	12	10	10	9	8	10	9	10	9	9	11	11	12	12	13	13

Updated to match(es) played on October 19, 2011. Source: MLSSoccer.com
A = Away; H = Home; W = Win; D = Draw; L = Loss

== Statistics ==
=== Competitions table ===
Competition	Started round	Final position / round	First match	Last match
MLS	Week 1	13th	March 19	October 22
U.S. Open Cup	Qualifier	Qualification semifinals	April 6	April 28
Carolina Challenge Cup	—	1st	March 5	March 12

Updated to match played October 22, 2011
Source: Competitions

=== MLS regular season ===
==== Field players ====
Nat	No.	Player	Pos	GP	GS	Min.	G	A	SHTS	SOG	FC	FS	Booked	Sent off (straight red)
(United States)	2	Brandon McDonald	DF	13	13	1139	0	0	4	0	15	7	2	0
(Uruguay)	3	Rodrigo Brasesco^{[A]}	DF	3	2	155	0	0	0	0	0	0	1	0
(United States)	3	Austin da Luz	DF	8	2	311	0	0	7	2	3	0	2	0
(United States)	4	Marc Burch	DF	12	8	787	1	1	2	1	6	6	2	0
(Canada)	5	Dejan Jakovic	DF	15	15	1324	0	0	2	1	18	9	3	1
(Costa Rica)	6	Kurt Morsink^{[B]}	MF	2	2	157	0	0	0	0	0	0	1	0
(Canada)	7	Dwayne De Rosario	MF	13	12	1166	10	6	55	26	25	20	1	0
(Montenegro)	8	Branko Bošković^{[B]}	MF	4	1	124	0	0	8	2	1	0	0	0
(United States)	9	Charlie Davies	FW	22	16	1388	11	3	31	17	22	21	3	0
(United States)	10	Dax McCarty^{[A]}	MF	13	11	946	0	2	10	2	12	13	1	0
(Zimbabwe)	11	Joseph Ngwenya	FW	14	6	572	0	0	11	6	19	8	1	0
(United States)	12	Jed Zayner^{[B]}	DF	4	4	311	0	1	0	0	0	0	0	0
(United States)	13	Chris Pontius^{[B]}	FW	25	25	2144	7	5	53	20	18	33	2	0
(Honduras)	14	Andy Najar	MF	25	22	1982	4	6	40	16	33	32	1	1
(United States)	15	Ethan White	DF	21	18	1659	1	0	5	4	14	1	3	0
(United States)	16	Josh Wolff	FW	24	19	1545	5	6	16	17	24	28	1	0
(United States)	19	Clyde Simms	MF	25	25	2132	0	0	8	1	17	5	1	0
(United States)	20	Stephen King	MF	15	7	717	1	0	9	3	6	8	0	0
(United States)	21	Daniel Woolard	DF	21	21	1868	0	0	5	0	14	17	0	0
(United States)	22	Chris Korb^{[B]}	DF	7	7	570	0	2	0	0	0	0	0	0
(United States)	23	Perry Kitchen	DF	25	24	2186	1	0	7	2	24	21	1	0
(United States)	24	Brandon Barklage	DF	4	0	38	0	0	2	1	1	0	0	0
(United States)	25	Santino Quaranta	MF	15	7	752	1	0	11	3	18	9	2	1
(Brazil)	27	Fred^{[A]}	MF	17	5	596	0	1	10	1	14	10	3	0
(United States)	29	Blake Brettschneider^{[B]}	FW	12	8	644	1	2	15	4	12	7	1	0

Updated to match played September 26, 2011
Source: D.C. United

==== Goalkeepers ====
Nat	No.	Player	GP	GS	Min.	SO	GA	SOG	SV	SV %	GAA	PG	PA	W	L	T
(United States)	1	Steve Cronin	2	0	126	0	4	10	6	0.6	2.86	0	0	0	0	2
(Canada)	20	Pat Onstad	3	3	270	0	7	16	8	0.5	2.33	2	2	1	2	0
(United States)	28	Bill Hamid	22	22	1852	7	26	83	56	0.675	1.26	4	4	7	4	9
(United States)	31	Joe Willis	3	3	270	1	4	16	12	0.75	1.33	0	0	1	2	0

Updated to match played September 26, 2011
Source: D.C. United

=== U.S. Open Cup ===
==== Field players ====
Nat	No.	Player	Pos	GP	GS	Min.	G	A	SHTS	SOG	FC	FS	Booked	Sent off (straight red)
(United States)	2	Brandon McDonald	DF	0	0	0	0	0	0	0	0	0	0	0
(Uruguay)	3	Rodrigo Brasesco^{[A]}	DF	1	1	41	0	0	0	0	0	0	0	0
(United States)	3	Austin da Luz	DF	0	0	0	0	0	0	0	0	0	0	0
(United States)	4	Marc Burch	DF	0	0	0	0	0	0	0	0	0	0	0
(Canada)	5	Dejan Jakovic	DF	1	0	79	0	0	0	0	0	0	0	0
(Costa Rica)	6	Kurt Morsink^{[B]}	MF	0	0	0	0	0	0	0	0	0	0	0
(Canada)	7	Dwayne De Rosario	MF	0	0	0	0	0	0	0	0	0	0	0
(Montenegro)	8	Branko Bošković^{[B]}	MF	1	1	120	2	0	0	0	0	0	0	0
(United States)	9	Charlie Davies	FW	0	0	0	0	0	0	0	0	0	0	0
(United States)	10	Dax McCarty^{[A]}	MF	0	0	0	0	0	0	0	0	0	0	0
(Zimbabwe)	11	Joseph Ngwenya	FW	1	1	120	0	1	0	0	0	0	0	0
(United States)	12	Jed Zayner^{[B]}	DF	0	0	0	0	0	0	0	0	0	0	0
(United States)	13	Chris Pontius^{[B]}	FW	1	0	31	0	0	0	0	0	0	0	0
(Honduras)	14	Andy Najar	MF	1	1	120	0	0	0	0	0	0	0	0
(United States)	15	Ethan White	DF	1	1	120	0	0	0	0	0	0	0	0
(United States)	16	Josh Wolff	FW	1	1	120	1	0	0	0	0	0	0	0
(United States)	19	Clyde Simms	MF	0	0	0	0	0	0	0	0	0	0	0
(United States)	20	Stephen King	MF	1	1	120	0	0	0	0	0	0	0	0
(United States)	21	Daniel Woolard	DF	1	1	120	0	0	0	0	0	0	0	0
(United States)	22	Chris Korb^{[B]}	DF	0	0	0	0	0	0	0	0	0	0	0
(United States)	23	Perry Kitchen	DF	0	0	0	0	0	0	0	0	0	0	0
(United States)	24	Brandon Barklage	DF	1	1	0	0	0	0	0	0	0	0	0
(United States)	25	Santino Quaranta	MF	0	0	0	0	0	0	0	0	0	0	0
(Brazil)	27	Fred^{[A]}	MF	1	1	89	0	0	0	0	0	0	0	0
(United States)	29	Blake Brettschneider^{[B]}	FW	0	0	0	0	0	0	0	0	0	0	0

Updated to match played October 24, 2011
Source: D.C. United match reports

==== Goalkeepers ====
Nat	No.	Player	GP	GS	Min.	SO	GA	SOG	SV	SV %	GAA	PG	PA	W	L	T
(United States)	1	Steve Cronin	2	0	126	0	4	10	6	0.6	2.86	0	0	0	0	2
(Canada)	20	Pat Onstad	3	3	270	0	7	16	8	0.5	2.33	2	2	1	2	0
(United States)	28	Bill Hamid	22	22	1852	7	26	83	56	0.675	1.26	4	4	7	4	9
(United States)	31	Joe Willis	3	3	270	1	4	16	12	0.75	1.33	0	0	1	2	0

Updated to match played October 24, 2011
Source: D.C. United match reports

=== Recognition ===
==== MLS Honors ====
Award	Player	Notes
Most Valuable Player	(Canada) Dwayne De Rosario	
Golden Boot	(Canada) Dwayne De Rosario	16 goals

==== MLS Player of the Month ====
Month	Player	Club	Link
August	(Canada) Dwayne De Rosario	D.C. United	3G 2A

==== MLS Player of the Week ====
Week	Player	Week's Statline
20	(Canada) Dwayne De Rosario	2G (53', 63')
21	(Canada) Dwayne De Rosario	3G (19', 64', 87')
22	(United States) Chris Pontius	2G (47+', 70')
25&26	(United States) Charlie Davies	3G (11', 14', 66')
28	(Canada) Dwayne De Rosario	3G (22', 27', 31')

==== MLS Best XI of the Week ====
Week	Player	Opponent(s)	Link
1	(United States) Ben Olsen	Columbus Crew	Team of the Week
5	(United States) Chris Pontius	Toronto FC	Team of the Week
5	(United States) Ethan White	Toronto FC	Team of the Week
8	(United States) Charlie Davies	Seattle	Team of the Week
11	(Canada) Dejan Jakovic	Portland	Team of the Week
12	(United States) Perry Kitchen	Los Angeles	Team of the Week
14	(United States) Chris Pontius	Real Salt Lake	Team of the Week
17	(United States) Ben Olsen	New York	Team of the Week
18	(United States) Ben Olsen	FC Dallas	Team of the Week
20	(Canada) Dwayne De Rosario	San Jose	Team of the Week
21	(Canada) Dwayne De Rosario	Toronto FC	Team of the Week
22	(Canada) Dwayne De Rosario	Vancouver	Team of the Week
22	(United States) Chris Pontius	Vancouver	Team of the Week
26	(United States) Perry Kitchen	Chivas USA	Team of the Week
26	(Canada) Dwayne De Rosario	Chivas USA	Team of the Week
26	(United States) Charlie Davies	Chivas USA	Team of the Week
26	(United States) Chris Pontius	Chivas USA	Team of the Week
26	(United States) Ben Olsen	Chivas USA	Team of the Week
28	(Canada) Dwayne De Rosario	Real Salt Lake	Team of the Week
28	(Honduras) Andy Najar	Real Salt Lake	Team of the Week
28	(United States) Stephen King	Real Salt Lake	Team of the Week

==== MLS All-Stars 2011 ====
Position	Player	Note
MF	(Canada) Dwayne De Rosario	Press Selection

=== Footnotes ===
A: Player left the club in the middle of the season
B: Player was injured during the campaign

== Transfers ==
=== In ===
No.	Pos.	Player	Transferred from	Fee/notes	Date	Source
10	MF	(United States) Dax McCarty	(United States) Portland Timbers	Traded for Rodney Wallace	November 24, 2010	
11	FW	(Zimbabwe) Joseph Ngwenya	(United States) Houston Dynamo	Selected in the MLS Re-Entry Draft	December 8, 2010	
15	DF	(United States) Ethan White	(United States) D.C. United Academy	Homegrown contract	December 14, 2010	
16	DF	(United States) Josh Wolff	(United States) Sporting Kansas City	Selected in the MLS Re-Entry Draft	December 15, 2010	
1	GK	(United States) Steve Cronin	(United States) Portland Timbers	Part of Troy Perkins deal	December 17, 2010	
21	DF	(United States) Daniel Woolard	(United States) Carolina RailHawks	Free transfer	January 6, 2011	
23	DF	(United States) Perry Kitchen	(United States) Akron Zips^{[A]}	Selected in the 2011 MLS SuperDraft	January 6, 2011	
27	MF	(Brazil) Fred	(United States) New England Revolution	Part of 2012 SuperDraft deal	February 18, 2011	
22	DF	(United States) Chris Korb	(United States) Akron Zips^{[A]}	Selected in the 2011 MLS SuperDraft	March 1, 2011	
29	DF	(United States) Blake Brettschneider	(United States) South Carolina Gamecocks^{[A]}	Selected in the 2011 MLS Supplemental Draft	March 3, 2011	
20	GK	(Canada) Pat Onstad	(United States) Houston Dynamo	Free transfer	March 9, 2011	
31	GK	(United States) Joe Willis	(United States) Denver Pioneers	Free transfer	March 16, 2011	
24	MF	(United States) Brandon Barklage^{[C]}	Free agent	Free transfer	March 25, 2011	
7	MF	(Canada) Dwayne De Rosario	(United States) New York Red Bulls	Part of Dax McCarty deal	June 27, 2011	
2	DF	(United States) Brandon McDonald	(United States) San Jose Earthquakes	Undisclosed	June 27, 2011	
3	MF	(United States) Austin da Luz	(United States) New York Red Bulls	Traded for international roster spot	July 18, 2011	

==== Out ====
No.	Pos.	Player	Transferred to	Fee/notes	Date	Source
99	FW	(Bolivia) Jaime Moreno	Retired	Free transfer	October 24, 2010	
15	FW	(Australia) Danny Allsopp	(Australia) Melbourne Victory	Free transfer	November 15, 2010	
16	DF	(United States) Jordan Graye	(United States) Portland Timbers	Acquired through MLS Expansion Draft	November 15, 2010	
16	MF	(Costa Rica) Rodney Wallace	(United States) Portland Timbers	Traded for 2011 SuperDraft pick	November 24, 2010	
4	DF	(Bolivia) Juan Peña	Retired	Released	December 2, 2010	
15	DF	(United States) Barry Rice	(United States) Akron Summit Assault	Released	December 2, 2010	
11	DF	(Spain) Carlos Varela	(Switzerland) Servette	Released	December 2, 2010	
24	MF	(United States) Brandon Barklage^{[C]}	(United States) D.C. United	Free transfer	December 6, 2010	
23	GK	(United States) Troy Perkins	(United States) Portland Timbers	Part of Steve Cronin deal	December 17, 2010	
7	FW	(United States) Adam Cristman	(United States) Los Angeles Galaxy	Traded for Supplemental Draft picks	January 11, 2011	
2	DF	(Trinidad and Tobago) Julius James	(United States) Columbus Crew	Waived	February 17, 2011	
20	GK	(Canada) Pat Onstad	Retired	Free transfer	May 31, 2011	
10	MF	(United States) Dax McCarty	(United States) New York Red Bulls	Traded for Dwayne De Rosario	June 27, 2011	
30	MF	(Brazil) Junior Carreiro	(Brazil) Salgueiro	Waived	June 29, 2011	
27	MF	(Brazil) Fred	(Australia) Melbourne Heart	Free transfer	July 21, 2011	

=== Loan in ===
No.	Pos.	Player	Loaned from	Start	End	Source
3	DF	(Uruguay) Rodrigo Brasesco	(Uruguay) Racing Montevideo	January 10, 2011	June 14, 2011	
9	FW	(United States) Charlie Davies	(France) Sochaux	February 15, 2011	December 1, 2011	

=== Loan out ===
No.	Pos.	Player	Loaned to	Start	End	Source
33	MF	(United States) Conor Shanosky	(United States) Harrisburg City Islanders	July 15, 2011	December 31, 2011	

== Miscellany ==
=== Allocation ranking ===
D.C. United is in the No. 15 position in the MLS Allocation Ranking. The allocation ranking is the mechanism used to determine which MLS club has first priority to acquire a U.S. National Team player who signs with MLS after playing abroad, or a former MLS player who returns to the league after having gone to a club abroad for a transfer fee. D.C. United started 2011 ranked No. 3 on the allocation list and used its ranking to acquire Charlie Davies. A ranking can be traded, provided that part of the compensation received in return is another club's ranking.

=== International roster spots ===
D.C. United has five international roster spots, the fewest of any MLS club. Each club in Major League Soccer is allocated eight international roster spots, which can be traded. D.C. United traded one spot to Kansas City on February 3, 2010, for use during the 2010 and 2011 seasons, traded another spot to Los Angeles Galaxy on February 17, 2011, for use during the 2011 and 2012 seasons, and traded another spot to New York Red Bulls on July 16, 2011, for use during the remainder of the 2011 season. The remaining roster slots must belong to domestic players. For clubs based in the United States, a domestic player is either a U.S. citizen, a permanent resident (green card holder) or the holder of other special status (e.g., refugee or asylum status).

As of February 12, United have 21 American players on their roster. This is the most of any MLS club.

=== Future draft pick trades ===
Acquired
Year	Draft	Round	Traded from	Ref.

Traded
Year	Draft	Round	Traded to	Ref.
2012	SuperDraft	Round 2	Columbus Crew	
2012	SuperDraft	Round 3	Houston Dynamo	
2013	SuperDraft	Round 2	New England Revolution	
