= 2011 Carolina Challenge Cup =

Tournament details
- Dates: March 5 – 12
- Teams: 4
- Venue(s): 1 (in 1 host city)

Final positions
- Champions: D.C. United
- Runners-up: Charleston Battery

Tournament statistics
- Matches played: 6
- Goals scored: 12 (2 per match)
- Top scorer(s): 12 players with 1 goal

The 2011 Carolina Challenge Cup was a four-team round robin pre-season competition hosted by the Charleston Battery. The 2011 Carolina Challenge Cup was contested among Charleston Battery, Chicago Fire, D.C. United, and Toronto FC, with D.C. United emerging as repeat champions.

== Teams ==
Four clubs competed in the tournament:

Team	League	Appearance
(United States) Charleston Battery (hosts)	USL Pro	8th
(United States) Chicago Fire	MLS	1st
(United States) D.C. United	MLS	6th
(Canada) Toronto FC	MLS	5th

== Standings ==
Teams	Pts	Pld	W	D	L	GF	GA	GD
D.C. United	7	3	2	1	0	5	3	+2
Charleston Battery	4	3	1	1	1	3	3	0
Chicago Fire	4	3	1	1	1	1	1	0
Toronto FC	1	3	0	1	2	3	5	-2

== Matches ==
March 5
5:00 PM ET

Toronto FC	0 – 1	Chicago Fire
Plata (yellow card) 31'; LaBrocca (yellow card) 33'; Soolsma (yellow card) 57'; Yourassowsky (yellow card) 67'	Report	Puerari 6'; Pause (red card) 36'

Blackbaud Stadium, Charleston, South Carolina, United States
March 5
7:15 PM ET

Charleston Battery	1 – 2	D.C. United
Armstrong 15' (pen.)	Report	Pontius 4'; Wolff 71'

Blackbaud Stadium, Charleston, South Carolina, United States
March 9
5:00 PM ET

D.C. United	1 – 0	Chicago Fire
Brettschneider 10'; Davies (yellow card) 34'; Shanosky (yellow card) 76'; Brasesco (yellow card) 89'	Report	Cháves (red card) 37'

Blackbaud Stadium, Charleston, South Carolina, United States
Referee: Juan Calos Rivera
March 9
7:15 PM ET

Charleston Battery	2 – 1	Toronto FC
Kelly 43'; Zaher 55'	Report	Sturgis 14' (pen.)

Blackbaud Stadium, Charleston, South Carolina, United States
March 12

Toronto FC	2 – 2	D.C. United
De Rosario 19' (pen.); Maicon Santos 28'; Yourassowsky (red card) 37'	Report	Davies 12'; Ngwenya 61'

Blackbaud Stadium, Charleston, South Carolina, United States
March 12
5:15 PM ET

Charleston Battery	0 – 0	Chicago Fire
Armstrong (red card) 31'; Wiltse (red card) 34'	Report	Paladini (yellow card) 31'; Videira (yellow card) 32' (yellow-red card) 39'

Blackbaud Stadium, Charleston, South Carolina, United States

== Goal scorers ==
1 goal

- (South Africa) Stephen Armstrong (Charleston)
- (United States) Dane Kelly (Charleston)
- (United States) Mike Zaher (Charleston)
- (Guatemala) Marco Pappa (Chicago)
- (United States) Blake Brettschneider (D.C.)
- (United States) Charlie Davies (D.C.)
- (Zimbabwe) Joseph Ngwenya (D.C.)
- (United States) Chris Pontius (D.C.)
- (United States) Josh Wolff (D.C.)
- (Canada) Dwayne De Rosario (Toronto)
- (Brazil) Maicon Santos (Toronto)
- (United States) Nathan Sturgis (Toronto)

== See also ==
Carolina Challenge Cup
