= 2010 MLS Re-Entry Draft =

College draft for soccer teams

General information
- Dates: Stage 1: December 8, 2010; Stage 2: December 15, 2010

Overview
- League: Major League Soccer

The two-stage 2010 MLS Re-Entry Draft took place on December 8, 2010 and December 15, 2010. The Stage 1 Draft of the Re-Entry Process took place on Wednesday, December 8, at 2 p.m. ET via teleconference. The Stage 2 Draft took place on Wednesday, December 15, at 2 p.m. ET. All 18 clubs had a representative participate.

Both Stage 1 and Stage 2 Drafts were conducted in the same order as the traditional Waiver Draft, with Vancouver selecting 17th and Portland selecting 18th.

If a player was not selected in either stage of the Re-Entry Process, that player became available on a first-come, first-served basis to all clubs.

== Available Players ==
The following players were required to meet age and service requirements to participate as stipulated by the terms of the new Collective Bargaining Agreement. Base salary figures for 2010 are from the MLS Players Union.

Available Player	Position	Made Available By	Contract Status	2010 Base Salary (US)	Re-Entry Draft Result
Marcelo Saragosa	Midfielder	Chivas USA	Option Declined	$130,000	Not selected
Alex Zotincă	Defender	Chivas USA	Option Declined	$60,000	Not selected
Claudio López	Forward	Colorado Rapids	Option Declined	$120,000	Not selected
Ciaran O'Brien	Midfielder	Colorado Rapids	Option Declined	$75,000	Not selected
Peter Vagenas	Midfielder	Colorado Rapids	Option Declined	$117,000	Not selected
Frankie Hejduk	Defender	Columbus Crew	Option Declined	$120,000	Selected by Sporting Kansas City, Stage 2
Duncan Oughton	Midfielder	Columbus Crew	Option Declined	$40,000	Not selected
Gino Padula	Defender	Columbus Crew	Option Declined	$165,000	Not selected
Guillermo Barros Schelotto	Forward	Columbus Crew	Option Declined	$140,000	Not selected
Jeff Cunningham	Forward	FC Dallas	Option Declined	$220,000	Selected by Columbus Crew, Stage 2
Darío Sala	Goalkeeper	FC Dallas	Option Declined	$160,000	Not selected
Jaime Moreno	Forward	D.C. United	Option Declined	$160,000	Not selected
Ryan Cochrane	Defender	Houston Dynamo	Option Declined	$100,000	Selected by New England Revolution, Stage 2
Richard Mulrooney	Midfielder	Houston Dynamo	Option Declined	$120,000	Not selected
Joseph Ngwenya	Forward	Houston Dynamo	Option Declined	$72,000	Selected by D.C. United, Stage 1
Pat Onstad	Goalkeeper	Houston Dynamo	Option Declined	$164,000	Not selected
Adrian Serioux	Defender	Houston Dynamo	Option Declined	$96,000	Not selected
Jovan Kirovski	Forward	Los Angeles Galaxy	Option Declined	$84,000	Withdrew after Stage 1 to negotiate a new contract with Los Angeles Galaxy
Dema Kovalenko	Midfielder	Los Angeles Galaxy	Option Declined	$136,500	Not selected
Preston Burpo	Goalkeeper	New England Revolution	Option Declined	$70,000	Not selected
Nico Colaluca	Midfielder	New England Revolution	Option Declined	$100,000	Not selected
Cory Gibbs	Defender	New England Revolution	Option Declined	$121,000	Selected by Chicago Fire, Stage 2
Khano Smith	Midfielder	New England Revolution	Option Declined	$50,004	Not selected
Juan Pablo Ángel	Forward	New York Red Bulls	Option Declined	$1,620,000	Selected by Los Angeles Galaxy, Stage 2
Luke Sassano	Midfielder	New York Red Bulls	Option Declined	$40,000	Selected by Los Angeles Galaxy, Stage 2
Carey Talley	Defender	New York Red Bulls	Option Declined	$99,996	Not selected
Fred	Forward	Philadelphia Union	Option Declined	$250,000	Selected by New England Revolution, Stage 2
Chris Seitz	Goalkeeper	Philadelphia Union	Option Declined	$100,000	Selected by Seattle Sounders FC, Stage 2
Khari Stephenson	Midfielder	San Jose Earthquakes	Option Declined	$151,500	Not selected
Tyrone Marshall	Defender	Seattle Sounders FC	Option Declined	$165,375	Selected by Colorado Rapids, Stage 2
Jimmy Conrad	Defender	Sporting Kansas City	Out of Contract	$232,750	Selected by Chivas USA, Stage 2
Aaron Hohlbein	Defender	Sporting Kansas City	Out of Contract	$40,000	Selected by Columbus Crew, Stage 1
Josh Wolff	Forward	Sporting Kansas City	Option Declined	$220,004	Selected by D.C. United, Stage 2
Nick Garcia	Defender	Toronto FC	Option Declined	$190,000	Not selected
Chris Sharpe	Goalkeeper	MLS League Pool	Option Declined	$40,000	Not selected

== Stage One ==
The Stage 1 Draft of the Re-Entry Process took place on Wednesday, December 8, at 2 p.m. ET via teleconference. Each club could either select a player from the eligible player list, or pass. Once a team passed, it could no longer participate in that stage of the Re-Entry Process. Stage 1 continued until all 18 clubs have passed on the available players. The only selections in Stage 1 were Joseph Ngwenya (selected by D.C. United) and Aaron Hohlbein (selected by Columbus Crew).

Clubs must exercise the option for, or extend a Bona Fide Offer to, players selected in Stage 1. Players that were out of contract may either accept or reject the Bona Fide Offer. Should a player reject the offer, the drafting club will hold the right of first refusal for that player in MLS. Players with option years left on their contract will automatically be added to the drafting club's roster. A Bona Fide Offer must include a first year salary at least equal to 2010 annual base salary and, for players age 30 with 8 years or more of MLS experience, at least equal to 5% greater than their 2010 annual base salary. Option years (1+1) must be included with salaries increasing by at least 5% each year.

Any player selected in Stage 1 will remain on the drafting Club's 2011 budget at the option price or Bona Fide Offer price until April 1, 2011. Clubs and players may not mutually renegotiate that price to a lower number until April 1, 2011.

Clubs may not select their own players in Stage 1. Players will have the opportunity to negotiate contracts and sign with their previous clubs after Stage 1 is complete through 2 p.m. ET on December 13. Jovan Kirovski was the only player to withdraw from re-entry consideration after Stage 1. Kirovski negotiated a new deal with his current club, the Los Angeles Galaxy.

=== Stage One, Round One ===
Pick #	Drafting Team	Player	Position	Former Team
1	D.C. United	Joseph Ngwenya	Forward	Houston Dynamo
2	Chivas USA	PASS		
3	Philadelphia Union	PASS		
4	New England Revolution	PASS		
5	Houston Dynamo	PASS		
6	Toronto FC	PASS		
7	Chicago Fire	PASS		
8	Sporting Kansas City	PASS		
9	Seattle Sounders FC	PASS		
10	Columbus Crew	Aaron Hohlbein	Defender	Sporting Kansas City
11	New York Red Bulls	PASS		
12	Real Salt Lake	PASS		
13	San Jose Earthquakes	PASS		
14	Los Angeles Galaxy	PASS		
15	FC Dallas	PASS		
16	Colorado Rapids	PASS		
17	Vancouver Whitecaps FC	PASS		
18	Portland Timbers	PASS		

=== Stage One, Round Two ===
Pick #	Drafting Team	Player	Position	Former Team
19	D.C. United	PASS		
20	Columbus Crew	PASS		

== Stage Two ==
The Stage 2 Draft took place on Wednesday, December 15, at 2 p.m. ET. Each club could either select a player from the eligible player list or pass. Once a team passed, they could no longer participate in that stage of the Re-Entry Process. The stage continued until all 18 clubs passed on the available players.

In Stage 2, clubs could select from players that were under contract and those not under contract. If a player is not under contract, the drafting club was required to make a genuine offer to the player within seven days. In the event that an agreement could not be reached between the drafting club and an out-of-contract player, the drafting club held the right of first refusal for that player in MLS. Clubs could select their own players in Stage 2 only after all other clubs have declined to select those players.

=== Stage Two, Round One ===
Pick #	Drafting Team	Player	Position	Former Team
1	D.C. United	Josh Wolff	Forward	Sporting Kansas City
2	Chivas USA	Jimmy Conrad	Defender	Sporting Kansas City
3	Philadelphia Union	PASS		
4	New England Revolution	Ryan Cochrane	Defender	Houston Dynamo
5	Los Angeles Galaxy (Note: #5: Houston Dynamo → Los Angeles Galaxy. 15 December 2010: Los Angeles Galaxy acquired the #5 pick in Stage Two of the 2010 MLS Re-Entry Draft from Houston Dynamo in exchange for a fourth-round selection in the 2014 MLS SuperDraft. The traded SuperDraft pick is Los Angeles's natural selection.)	Juan Pablo Ángel	Forward	New York Red Bulls
6	Toronto FC	PASS		
7	Chicago Fire	Cory Gibbs	Defender	New England Revolution
8	Sporting Kansas City	Frankie Hejduk	Defender	Columbus Crew
9	Seattle Sounders FC	Chris Seitz	Goalkeeper	Philadelphia Union
10	Columbus Crew	Jeff Cunningham	Forward	FC Dallas
11	New York Red Bulls	PASS		
12	Real Salt Lake	PASS		
13	San Jose Earthquakes	PASS		
14	Los Angeles Galaxy	Luke Sassano	Midfielder	New York Red Bulls
15	FC Dallas	PASS		
16	Colorado Rapids	Tyrone Marshall	Defender	Seattle Sounders FC
17	Vancouver Whitecaps FC	PASS		
18	Portland Timbers	PASS		

=== Stage Two, Round Two ===
Pick #	Drafting Team	Player	Position	Former Team
19	D.C. United	PASS		
20	Chivas USA	PASS		
21	New England Revolution	Fred	Forward	Philadelphia Union
22	Houston Dynamo	PASS		
23	Chicago Fire	PASS		
24	Sporting Kansas City	PASS		
25	Seattle Sounders FC	PASS		
26	Columbus Crew	PASS		
27	Los Angeles Galaxy	PASS		
28	Colorado Rapids	PASS		

=== Stage Two, Round Three ===
Pick #	Drafting Team	Player	Position	Former Team
29	New England Revolution	PASS		
