= Fred (footballer, born 1979) =

Brazilian footballer

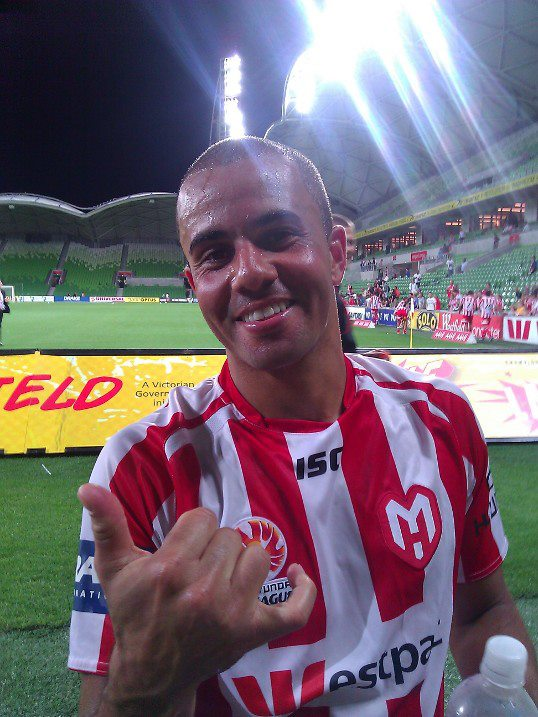

Personal information
- Full name: Helbert Frederico Carreiro da Silva
- Date of birth: 18 August 1979 (age 47)
- Place of birth: Belo Horizonte, Brazil
- Height: 5 ft 8 in (1.73 m)
- Position: Attacking midfielder

Senior career*
Years	Team	Apps	(Gls)
1997–1998	Olympic Barbacena	10	(9)
1998–2000	Tupi	48	(20)
2001–2004	América	80	(45)
2005–2006	Guarani	35	(15)
2006–2007	Melbourne Victory	20	(4)
2007–2009	D.C. United	72	(11)
2008	→ Wellington Phoenix (loan)	3	(1)
2010	Philadelphia Union	25	(4)
2011	D.C. United	17	(0)
2011–2013	Melbourne Heart	38	(3)
2014–2015	Philadelphia Union	17	(1)
2016	Bethlehem Steel	6	(0)
2017–2018	Harrisburg Heat (indoor)	5	(0)
Total		371	(68)

Managerial career
- 2025–: Philadelphia Union II
- 2026-: Philadelphia Union
- * Club domestic league appearances and goals as of 15 December 2017

Helbert Frederico Carreiro da Silva (born 18 August 1979), known as Fred, is a Brazilian former footballer who became an assistant coach for Philadelphia Union II. Carreiro played for the Harrisburg Heat of the Major Arena Soccer League. He also played for Australian A-League side Melbourne Heart, MLS sides D.C. United & Philadelphia Union, and Brazilian side América among other clubs.

== Career ==
=== Brazil ===
Fred began his career in his native Brazil, playing for Olympic Barbacena, Tupi, América and Guarani.

=== Melbourne Victory ===
Fred signed for Australian club Melbourne Victory in 2006 and, despite a controversial three-game suspension for an alleged elbow, was one of the standouts of the 2006–07 A-League season. His popularity increased when he appeared in a television commercial promoting underwear. He was voted best A-League player for season 2 by The World Game Team. In the 2007 A-League Grand Final against Adelaide United, Fred had four assists on the five goals scored by Archie Thompson.

=== D.C. United ===
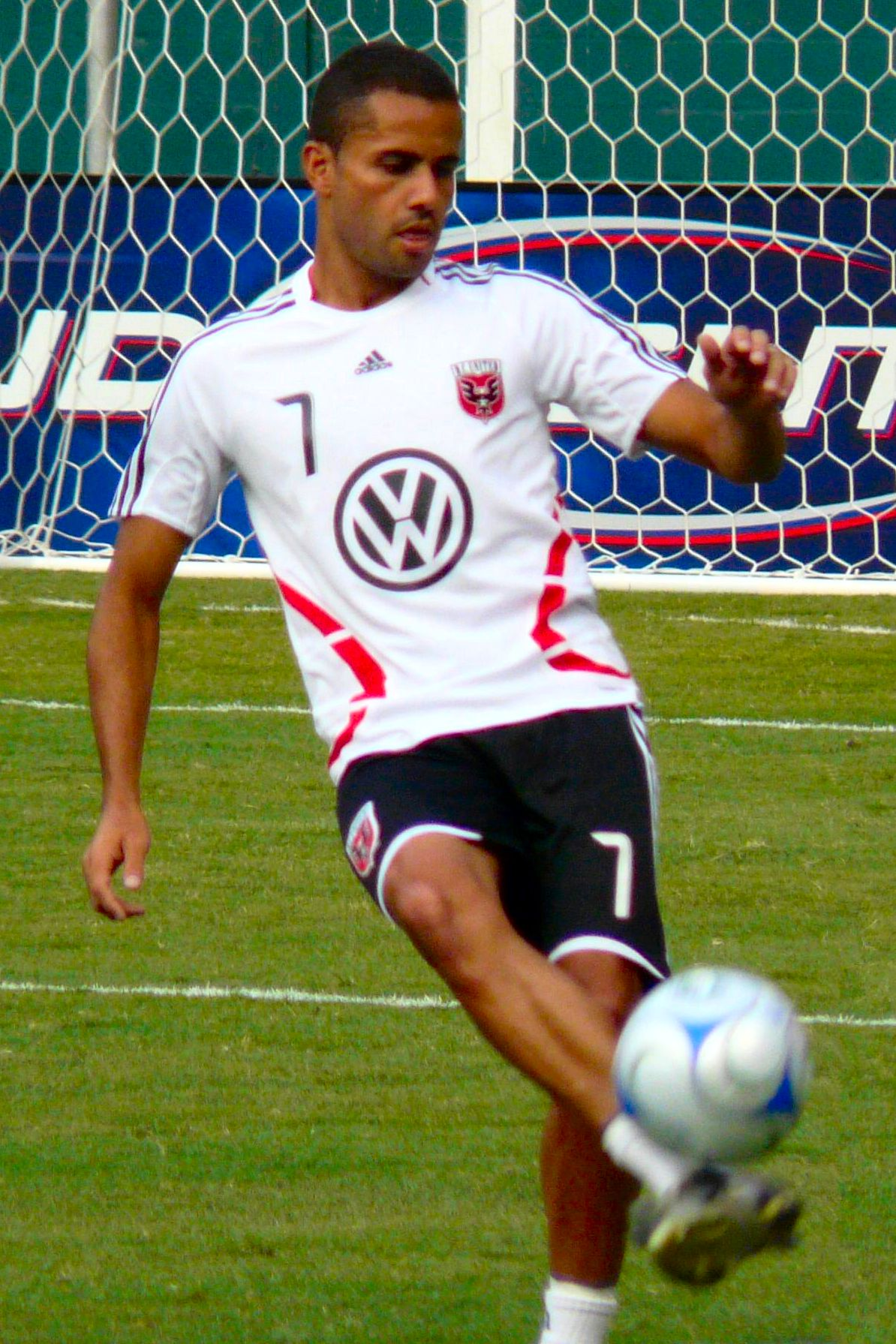
Fred with D.C. United in 2008

After the season, Fred signed with Major League Soccer club D.C. United. It was reported to be a matter of money, as United offered a guaranteed salary of US$222,000 per year (which the Melbourne Victory could not match due to the more stringent salary cap in the A-League).

The name on the back of his D.C. United jersey was simply "Fred", despite initially being told he would have to use his proper last name, per MLS rules at the time (which have since changed). He made his debut on 3 April 2007 against Chivas de Guadalajara in a CONCACAF Champions Cup semifinal match. On 3 September 2008, Fred scored the game-winning goal in D.C. United's 2–1 win over the Charleston Battery in the US Open Cup Final.

=== Wellington Phoenix ===
On 14 November 2008, Fred was confirmed as a guest player for New Zealand-based A-League club Wellington Phoenix. He was scheduled to play six games for the Phoenix before returning to D.C. United for the next season. In his third game, he scored his first goal, against Adelaide United, although the Phoenix still lost 6–1. On 10 December 2008, Fred returned to Brazil due to his father's sudden death and on 18 December it was announced that Fred would not return to the Wellington Phoenix to complete his contract meaning he only appeared in three of his six scheduled games in New Zealand.

=== Philadelphia Union ===
On 13 January 2010, Fred was traded to Philadelphia Union, along with D.C. United's first-round 2010 MLS SuperDraft pick, and allocation money in exchange for Philadelphia's top spot in the allocation order. D.C. subsequently used the top allocation ranking to re-acquire goalkeeper Troy Perkins. A list telling the players that were available for the new MLS Re-Entry Draft revealed that he was available for the draft due to being out of contact.

=== New England Revolution ===
On 15 December 2010, Fred was chosen by New England Revolution in the second round of the 2010 MLS Re-Entry Draft. However, he declined the club's contract offer and pursued a contract outside of MLS.

=== Back to D.C. United ===
Fred returned to MLS and signed with D.C. United on 18 February 2011 after D.C. acquired his MLS rights from New England for a second-round 2013 MLS SuperDraft pick.

=== Melbourne Heart ===
On 20 June 2011, Fred was announced as one of Melbourne Heart's big name off-season signings, on a salary of $200,000 AUD for the season. He came following his brief second stint at D.C. United of MLS, officially joining his new club when the international transfer window opened in mid-July 2011. Melbourne Heart are the direct cross-town rivals of Fred's former club, Melbourne Victory, with whom he achieved the 2006/07 Premiership and Championship double. Fred played against his former team for the first time in the 3rd round of the 2011/12 season.

On 22 April 2012 Fred was named the Alex Tobin player of the year for 2012 whilst playing for Melbourne Heart.

As a result of the Heart finishing second-to-last on the A-League ladder, their worst finish in an A-League season, Fred, along with teammates Simon Colosimo, Matt Thompson and Clint Bolton, were released by the Heart at the conclusion of the 2012–13 A-League season.

=== Return to Philadelphia Union ===
On 20 March 2014 Philadelphia Union re-acquired Fred through the MLS waiver draft system.

=== Harrisburg Heat ===
In 2017, Fred joined Major Arena Soccer League club Harrisburg Heat.

== Coaching ==
Fred began coaching in the Philadelphia Union Academy system in 2016. In February 2025, he was appointed as an assistant coach for the Union's MLS Next Pro side, Philadelphia Union II.

On June 26, 2026 Fred was appointed as an interim Assistant Coach for the Philadelphia Union.

== Personal life ==
Fred is the older brother of Júnior Carreiro, who is also a professional footballer and midfielder and his former teammate at D.C. United in 2011.

It has been reported that Fred holds a U.S. green card which would qualify him as a domestic player for MLS roster purposes.

== Honours ==
Melbourne Victory

- A-League Champions: 2006–07
- A-League Premiers: 2006–07

D.C. United

- Major League Soccer: 2007
- Lamar Hunt U.S. Open Cup: 2008

Individual

- Four Four Two Player of the Year: 2006–07
- Four Four Two Import of the Season 2006–07
- A-League Team of the Season: 2011–12

== Career statistics ==
Updated 17 October 2010

	Season	Campeonato Brasileiro Série D		Copa do Brasil		Campeonato		South America		Total
	Season	App	Goals	App	Goals	App	Goals	App	Goals	App	Goals
Tupi	1998	?	?	-	-	-	-	-	-	?	?
Tupi	1999	?	?	-	-	-	-	-	-	?	?
Tupi	2000	?	?	-	-	-	-	-	-	?	?
Tupi	Club Total	48	13	0	0	0	0	0	0	48	13
	Season	Campeonato Brasileiro Série C		Copa do Brasil		Campeonato		South America		Total
	Season	App	Goals	App	Goals	App	Goals	App	Goals	App	Goals
América	2001	?	?	-	-	-	-	-	-	?	?
América	2002	?	?	-	-	-	-	-	-	?	?
América	2003	?	?	-	-	-	-	-	-	?	?
América	2004	?	?	-	-	-	-	-	-	?	?
América	Club Total	80	20	0	0	0	0	0	0	80	20
	Season	Campeonato Brasileiro Série B		Copa do Brasil		Campeonato		South America		Total
	Season	App	Goals	App	Goals	App	Goals	App	Goals	App	Goals
Guarani	2005	?	?	-	-	-	-	-	-	?	?
Guarani	2006	?	?	-	-	-	-	-	-	?	?
Guarani	Club Total	35	8	0	0	0	0	0	0	35	8
	Season	A-League						Asia		Total
	Season	App	Goals	App	Goals	App	Goals	App	Goals	App	Goals
Melbourne Victory	2006–07	17	4	-	-	-	-	-	-	17	4
Melbourne Victory	Club Total	17	4	0	0	0	0	0	0	17	4
	Season	MLS		U.S. Open Cup		MLS Cup Playoffs		North America		Total
	Season	App	Goals	App	Goals	App	Goals	App	Goals	App	Goals
D.C. United	2007	26	7	0	0	2	0	?	?	28	7
D.C. United	Club Total	26	7	0	0	2	0	0	0	28	7
	Season	A-League						Asia		Total
	Season	App	Goals	App	Goals	App	Goals	App	Goals	App	Goals
Wellington Phoenix	2008–09	3	1	-	-	-	-	-	-	3	1
Wellington Phoenix	Club Total	3	1	0	0	0	0	0	0	3	1
	Season	MLS		U.S. Open Cup		MLS Cup Playoffs		North America		Total
	Season	App	Goals	App	Goals	App	Goals	App	Goals	App	Goals
D.C. United	2008	23	2	4	1	-	-	7	1	34	4
D.C. United	2009	23	2	2	0	-	-	4	1	29	3
D.C. United	Club Total	46	4	6	1	0	0	11	2	63	7
Philadelphia Union	2010	25	4	-	-	-	-	-	-	25	4
Philadelphia Union	Club Total	25	4	0	0	0	0	0	0	25	4
Career Total		279	61	6	1	6	0	11	2	302	62
