= Blake Brettschneider =

American soccer player (born 1989)

Personal information
- Full name: Blake Brettschneider
- Date of birth: April 11, 1989 (age 37)
- Place of birth: Lilburn, Georgia, U.S.
- Height: 6 ft 2 in (1.88 m)
- Position: Forward

College career
Years	Team	Apps	(Gls)
2007–2010	South Carolina Gamecocks		

Senior career*
Years	Team	Apps	(Gls)
2008	Atlanta Silverbacks U23's	12	(2)
2009–2010	Atlanta Blackhawks	12	(1)
2011	D.C. United	15	(1)
2012	New England Revolution	17	(2)
2013	Rochester Rhinos	25	(5)

International career^{‡}
2008	United States U20	1	(0)
- * Club domestic league appearances and goals as of November 7, 2013 ‡ National team caps and goals as of August 5, 2012

Blake Brettschneider (born April 11, 1989) is an American retired soccer player, who is currently an attorney.

== Career ==
=== Youth ===
Brettschneider played soccer for the University of South Carolina. In 2010, he led the team with 7 goals and 10 assists. While at the University of South Carolina, he also played in the USL Premier Development League for both the Atlanta Silverbacks U23's and the Atlanta Blackhawks.

=== Professional ===
Brettschneider was selected by D.C. United with the third pick in the second round of the 2011 MLS Supplemental Draft. He signed a contract with the team on March 3, 2011, and made his professional debut on April 3, 2011, in a 4–1 loss to the Colorado Rapids. Brettschneider scored his first career goal on June 11, 2011, in a 4–2 loss against San Jose Earthquakes.

Brettschnider was released by United on February 3, 2012. On March 6, 2012, he signed as a free agent with New England Revolution. He scored his first Revolution goal on May 5 against Real Salt Lake. The strike was nominated for MLS Goal of the Week. He was released by New England following the 2012 season. Brettschnider was picked up by the Rochester Rhinos of the USL Pro league.

=== International ===
In 2008 Brettschneider participated in the United States U-20 men's national soccer team player pool camp, but did not feature in any games.

== Post-career ==
At the end of the 2013 season, Brettschneider was released by Rochester, and subsequently retired from professional soccer. He moved back to the Atlanta metropolitan area to work in the finance industry from 2014 until 2018 for companies such as Northwestern Mutual, Sage Group, and NuVasive. In 2018, he enrolled in the University of Denver's Sturm College of Law, where he graduated in 2021.
