= Rodrigo Brasesco =

Uruguayan footballer (born 1986)

Personal information
- Full name: Rodrigo Brasesco
- Date of birth: January 25, 1986 (age 40)
- Place of birth: Montevideo, Uruguay
- Height: 5 ft 10 in (1.78 m)
- Position: Centre back

Team information
- Current team: Racing Montevideo
- Number: 2

Senior career*
Years	Team	Apps	(Gls)
2004–2008	Sud América	75	(2)
2008–2015	Racing Club	154	(5)
2011	→ D.C. United (loan)	3	(0)
2014	→ Cafetaleros (loan)	8	(0)
2015–2018	Magallanes	63	(2)
2018–	Racing Montevideo	26	(0)
- * Club domestic league appearances and goals as of 18:10, 15 April 2020 (UTC)

Rodrigo Brasesco (born 25 January 1986 in Montevideo) is an Uruguayan footballer who currently plays for Racing Club de Montevideo as a centre back.

== Club career ==
Born in Montevideo, Uruguay, Brasesco started his career with Sud América. In 2008, he moved to Uruguayan Primera Division side Racing Club. A regular starter for Racing, in 2009 Brasesco helped his club qualify to the Copa Libertadores for the first time in its history. During his career in Uruguay Brasesco has appeared in 154 league matches and scored 4 goals.

On January 10, 2011, D.C. United signed Brasesco on a loan deal from Racing Club de Montevideo. He made his debut for the club as a late substitute in their opening game of the 2011 MLS season, a 3–1 win over Columbus Crew, but was waived by the club on June 14, having made just three first team appearances for the team.
