= Joseph Ngwenya =

Zimbabwean footballer (born 1981)

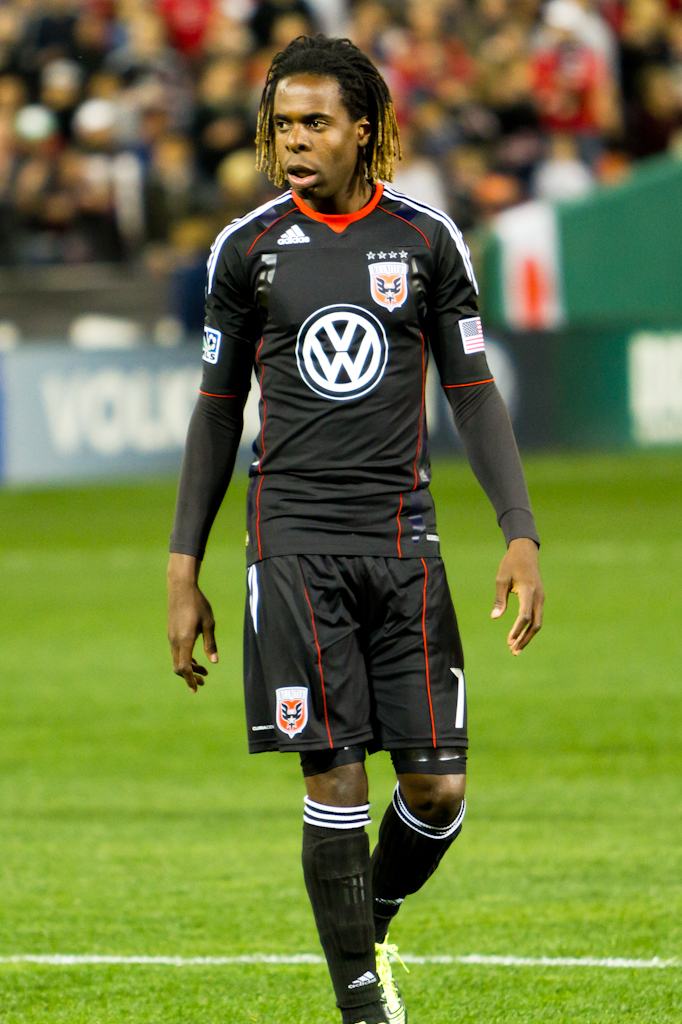

Personal information
- Full name: Joseph Ngwenya
- Date of birth: March 30, 1981 (age 45)
- Place of birth: Plumtree, Zimbabwe
- Height: 6 ft 1 in (1.85 m)
- Position: Forward

College career
Years	Team	Apps	(Gls)
2000–2003	Coastal Carolina Chanticleers	81	(66)

Senior career*
Years	Team	Apps	(Gls)
2003	Cape Cod Crusaders	13	(17)
2004–2006	Los Angeles Galaxy	40	(4)
2006–2007	Columbus Crew	25	(5)
2007	Houston Dynamo	25	(7)
2008	Austria Kärnten	1	(0)
2008–2009	Antalyaspor	11	(1)
2010	Houston Dynamo	12	(1)
2011	D.C. United	16	(0)
2013	Richmond Kickers	20	(9)
2014	Pittsburgh Riverhounds	20	(1)
Total		183	(45)

International career
2008	Zimbabwe	5	(0)
- * Club domestic league appearances and goals

Joseph Ngwenya (born March 30, 1981, in Plumtree) is a Zimbabwean former footballer.

== Career ==
=== College ===
Ngwenya attended the Mzilikazi High School in Bulawayo, leading them to the 1999 Zimbabwe National High School Championship, before moving to the United States in 2000 to attend and play college soccer at Coastal Carolina University. He led the NCAA in scoring with 21 goals and 14 assists and was named a First Team All-American in 2003.

During his college years he also played in the USL Premier Development League for Cape Cod Crusaders who he led to a PDL title, scoring with 17 goals in 13 games.

=== Professional ===
Ngwenya was drafted third overall of the 2004 MLS SuperDraft by Los Angeles Galaxy of Major League Soccer. In his first year with the Galaxy, he played at both forward and midfield and finished the year with four goals in 22 games, most of them coming off the bench. In his second year, he was bothered by injury did not score a goal or an assist. Ngwenya was involved in a 4-person trade on May 12, 2006, which sent him to the Crew, for whom he would play 20 games and score five goals in 2006.

In the period following the 2006 season, Ngwenya went on trial at Getafe in the Spanish first division, but failed to earn a contract. He was traded to Houston Dynamo during the 2007 season for Alejandro Moreno. Ngwenya scored the game tying goal in the 2007 MLS Cup Final which Houston won 2–1 at RFK Stadium.

Following the 2007 MLS season, Ngwenya joined German second division team Alemannia Aachen for an opportunity to train and tryout with the Bundesliga club.

On January 21, 2008, Ngwenya was signed by Austrian Bundesliga club SK Austria Kärnten. After Kärnten dissolved his contract in summer 2008 he gained the chance to train with the first squad of FC Bayern Munich for three weeks. On July 23, 2008, Ngwenya appeared in the unofficial T-Home German Supercup for Bayern Munich against Borussia Dortmund.

After going almost a year without a club on April 6, 2010, Houston Dynamo announced that Ngwenya would be evaluated on a one-week basis for consideration of a return to the team. The Dynamo recognized the need for help at the forward position after Brian Ching sustained a hamstring injury in their home opener against Real Salt Lake. He agreed terms with Houston on April 12, 2010.

Ngwenya remained with Houston for the 2010 season but was not tendered a contract for 2011. He entered the 2010 MLS Re-Entry Draft and was selected by D.C. United with the first pick.

He spent the 2011 season with D.C. United, scoring zero goals in 16 games. At season's end, the club declined his 2012 contract option and he entered the 2011 MLS Re-Entry Draft. Ngwenya was not selected in the draft and became a free agent.

Ngwenya signed with USL Pro club Richmond Kickers on April 11, 2013.

It was announced on November 5, 2013, that Ngwenya has signed a contract with USL Pro club the Pittsburgh Riverhounds for the 2014 season.

=== International ===
Ngwenya was named in Zimbabwe's squad for the 2010 World Cup Qualifiers, and started against Guinea and his first home game against Namibia.

== Honors ==
=== Cape Cod Crusaders ===
- USL Premier Development League Champions: 2003

=== Los Angeles Galaxy ===
- Lamar Hunt U.S. Open Cup: 2005
- Major League Soccer MLS Cup: 2005
- Major League Soccer Western Conference Championship: 2005

=== Houston Dynamo ===
- Major League Soccer MLS Cup: 2007
- Major League Soccer Western Conference Championship: 2007
