= Conor Shanosky =

American professional soccer player (born 1991)

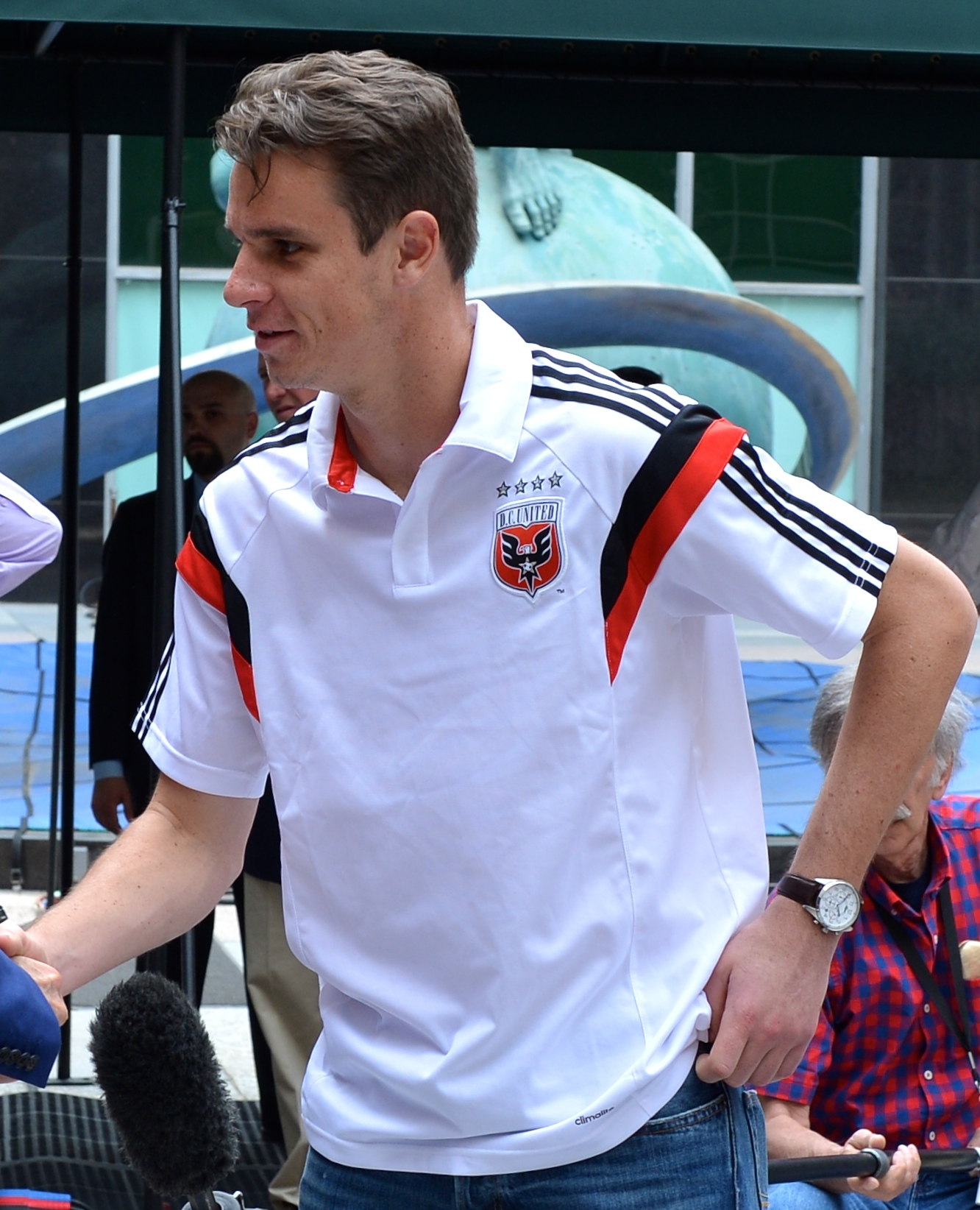

Personal information
- Date of birth: December 13, 1991 (age 34)
- Place of birth: Pittsburgh, Pennsylvania, United States
- Height: 6 ft 4 in (1.93 m)
- Position: Defender

Youth career
- 2009–2010: D.C. United

Senior career*
Years	Team	Apps	(Gls)
2010–2014	D.C. United	5	(0)
2011	→ Harrisburg City Islanders (loan)	2	(0)
2012	→ Fort Lauderdale Strikers (loan)	27	(0)
2013	→ Richmond Kickers (loan)	14	(2)
2014	→ Richmond Kickers (loan)	17	(1)
2015–2016	Louisville City	41	(4)
2016–2020	Richmond Kickers	67	(2)
Total		173	(9)

International career
2010–2011	United States U20	8	(0)
- * Club domestic league appearances and goals

Conor Shanosky (born December 13, 1991) is an American former professional soccer player who played as a defender.

== Early life ==
Shanosky was born in Pittsburgh, Pennsylvania; he grew up in Sterling, Virginia.

== Professional career ==
=== D.C. United ===
Shanosky signed a professional contract with D.C. United on August 13, 2010, after having previously signed to play soccer for George Mason University. He was one of four players to sign homegrown player contracts with D.C. United from their academy system, the other three being Ethan White, Andy Najar, and Bill Hamid. He was not eligible to play in any matches during the 2010 season.

On July 19, 2011, Shanosky joined USL Pro club Harrisburg City Islanders on loan. On March 2, 2012, the Fort Lauderdale Strikers of the North American Soccer League announced the signing of Shanosky on a season-long loan. On March 19, 2013, Shanosky was loaned to United's USL Pro affiliate Richmond Kickers for the 2013 season.

Shanosky left D.C. United in 2015 after making a total of 6 appearances for the club.

=== Louisville City ===
Shanosky signed with Louisville City FC of USL Pro on January 21, 2015. During the 2015 season he made 28 appearances for the club and scored three goals. During the next season, Shanosky made 15 appearances for the club and scored one goal before leaving the club midseason to rejoin the Richmond Kickers. Shanosky played 3,267 minutes in his time with Louisville.

=== Richmond Kickers ===
On September 2, 2016, Shanosky resigned with the Richmond Kickers on a permanent deal, he had previously spent time with the club on loan from D.C. United. During the 2016 season he made four appearances for the team. During the 2017 season Shanosky made 18 appearances and scored one goal for the Kickers. During the 2018 season, Shanosky played 24 games for the Kickers without scoring any goals.

In 2019 the Kickers announced that they would move from the USL Championship to USL League One, becoming founding members of the new third division. Shanosky re-signed with Richmond on February 20, 2019, ahead of the club's inaugural USL League One campaign. During the 2019 season Shanosky made 22 appearances for the Kickers and scored one goal as the club finished in 9th place. On August 6, 2020, Richmond mutually agreed to terminate Shanosky's contract. Darren Sawatzky stated on the "League One Fun" podcast that Shanosky was moving to Scotland with Megan Crosson, his girlfriend, who had signed with Celtic F.C. Sawatzky stated that he believed that Shanosky would either tryout for teams in Scotland or try to coach because he has his USSF C coaching license.

Shanosky finished his career with Richmond making 72 appearances, scoring two goals, and making three assists.

== Career statistics ==
Club	Season	League			Cup		Other		Total	
Club	Season	Division	Apps	Goals	Apps	Goals	Apps	Goals	Apps	Goals
D.C. United	2010	Major League Soccer	0	0	0	0	0	0	0	0
D.C. United	2011	Major League Soccer	0	0	0	0	0	0	0	0
D.C. United	2012	Major League Soccer	0	0	0	0	0	0	0	0
D.C. United	2013	Major League Soccer	5	0	2	0	0	0	7	0
D.C. United	2014	Major League Soccer	0	0	0	0	0	0	0	0
D.C. United	Total		5	0	2	0	0	0	7	0
Louisville City	2015	USL Championship	28	3	1	0	0	0	29	3
Louisville City	2016	USL Championship	15	1	0	0	0	0	15	1
Louisville City	Total		43	4	1	0	0	0	44	4
Richmond Kickers	2016	USL Championship	4	0	0	0	0	0	4	0
Richmond Kickers	2017	USL Championship	18	1	1	0	0	0	18	1
Richmond Kickers	2018	USL Championship	24	0	3	0	0	0	27	0
Richmond Kickers	2019	USL League One	22	1	1	0	0	0	23	1
Richmond Kickers	2020	USL League One	0	0	—		0	0	0	0
Richmond Kickers	Total		68	2	5	0	0	0	73	2
Harrisburg City Islanders (loan)	2011	USL Championship	2	0	0	0	0	0	2	0
Fort Lauderdale Strikers (loan)	2012	North American Soccer League	28	0	1	0	0	0	29	0
Richmond Kickers (loan)	2013	USL Championship	16	2	0	0	0	0	16	2
Richmond Kickers (loan)	2014	USL Championship	19	2	0	0	0	0	19	2
Loan Totals			65	4	1	0	0	0	66	4

== International career ==
Shanosky was a member of the United States Men's U-20 team that won the 2010 Milk Cup in Northern Ireland, where he played in three games.
