= 2009 D.C. United season =

D.C. United
2009 season
- Owner: D.C. United Holdings
- Coach: Tom Soehn
- MLS: 10th
- MLS Cup: Did not qualify
- U.S. Open Cup: Runners-up
- CONCACAF Champions League: Group stage
- Carolina Challenge Cup: Runners-up
- Atlantic Cup: Champions
- Highest home attendance: 24,175 vs. Chivas USA (October 24)
- Average home league attendance: 15,585
Home colors	Away colors

The 2009 D.C. United season was the fourteenth season of the team's existence. It began on March 22, 2009, with a 2–2 draw at the Los Angeles Galaxy and ended on October 22, 2009, at the Kansas City Wizards by the same 2–2 scoreline.

== Off-season ==
D.C. United was involved in the following off-season activity:

=== Draft ===
The 2009 MLS SuperDraft took place on January 15, 2009. With draft order determined by regular and post-season record, United received the sixth pick in each round. Additionally, United acquired the Colorado Rapids' first-round pick (#7 overall) and Houston Dynamo's second-round (#26 overall). United's fourth-round (#51 overall) pick went to Colorado.

Player	Position	Pick overall (round)	Previous club
Rodney Wallace	M	#6 (1st)	University of Maryland
Chris Pontius	M/F	#7 (1st)	UC Santa Barbara
Milos Kocic	GK	#21 (2nd)	Loyola College in Maryland
Lyle Adams	DF	#26 (2nd)	Wake Forest University; Central Florida Kraze
Brandon Barklage	M/F	#36 (3rd)	Saint Louis University; Chicago Fire Premier

=== Re-signings ===
- Santino Quaranta – January 6, 2009
- Bryan Namoff – January 6
- Marc Burch – January 7
- Francis Doe – January 21
- Devon McTavish – January 28

=== Signings ===
- Andrew Jacobson – February 10
- Dejan Jakovic – February 27
- Brandon Barklage – March 3
- Anthony Peters – March 3
- Milos Kocic – March 12

=== Released ===
- Marcelo Gallardo – January 30

=== Waived ===
- Ryan Miller – March 25

=== Transactions ===
Date	Pos.	Name	From	Exchange
February 9	M	Christian Gomez; International roster spot Salary cap considerations	Colorado Rapids	Iván Guerrero; Designated Player roster spot 2010 MLS SuperDraft second-round pick
March 10	GK	Josh Wicks	Los Angeles Galaxy	Conditional MLS SuperDraft pick
March 27	M	John DiRaimondo	Waivers from Colorado Rapids	

=== Loaned ===
Date	Name	Team	Terms
January 22	Gonzalo Peralta	Unión de Santa Fe (Argentina B)	Undisclosed

== Squad ==
=== First-team squad ===
As of August 25, 2009. For recent transfers, see List of transfers for the 2009 Major League Soccer season.

Note: Flags indicate national team as defined under FIFA eligibility rules; some limited exceptions apply. Players may hold more than one non-FIFA nationality.

No.	Pos.	Nation	Player
1	GK	SRB	Miloš Kočić
2	DF	TRI	Julius James
3	DF	TRI	Avery John
4	DF	USA	Marc Burch
5	DF	CAN	Dejan Jakovic
6	MF	USA	John DiRaimondo
7	MF	BRA	Fred
8	MF	USA	Andrew Jacobson
9	FW	COD	Ange N'Silu
10	MF	ARG	Christian Gómez
11	FW	BRA	Luciano Emilio
12	MF	USA	Danny Szetela
13	FW	USA	Chris Pontius
14	MF	USA	Ben Olsen

No.	Pos.	Nation	Player
16	DF	USA	Greg Janicki
17	FW	RSA	Thabiso Khumalo
18	DF	USA	Devon McTavish
19	MF	USA	Clyde Simms
20	MF	USA	Ely Allen
21	MF	RSA	Tiyiselani Shipalane (on loan from Harrisburg)
22	MF	CRC	Rodney Wallace
23	DF	BDI	David Habarugira
24	MF	USA	Brandon Barklage
25	MF	USA	Santino Quaranta
26	DF	USA	Bryan Namoff
28	GK	USA	Bill Hamid
31	GK	USA	Josh Wicks
99	FW	BOL	Jaime Moreno (captain)

== Season transactions ==
=== Trades ===
Date	Pos.	Name	From	Exchange
April 23	DF	Avery John	New England Revolution	Conditional MLS SuperDraft pick

=== Waived ===
- April 23 – Francis Doe

== Statistical leaders ==
Last updated 4 May 2009

Goals

- Luciano Emilio – 10
- Jaime Moreno – 9
- Christian Gomez – 6

Assists

- Santino Quaranta – 6
- Christian Gomez - 4
- Bryan Namoff - 4

Minutes

- Clyde Simms – 2,457
- Bryan Namoff – 2,326
- Rodney Wallace – 2,265

Fouls committed

- Rodney Wallace – 52
- Ben Olsen – 36
- Marc Burch - 27

Fouls suffered

- Santino Quaranta – 40
- Ben Olsen – 35
- Chris Pontius – 35

== Club ==
=== Management ===
Position	Staff
General Manager	(United States) Dave Kasper
Manager	(United States) Tom Soehn
Assistant manager	(United States) Mark Simpson
Assistant manager	(United States) Chad Ashton
Athletic trainer	(United States) Brian Goodstein
Equipment manager	(United States) David Brauzer

Last updated: April 18, 2009
Source: D.C. United

=== Other information ===
Owner	(United States) D.C. United Holdings
Ground (capacity and dimensions)	Robert F. Kennedy Memorial Stadium (56,692 / N/A)

Source: D.C. United

== Competitions ==
Key

Win Tie Loss

=== Overall ===
Competition	Started round	Current position / round	Final position / round	First match	Last match
MLS	—	—		March 21, 2009	
USOC	Third round	—	Runner-up	June 30, 2009	September 2, 2009
CONCACAF Champions League 2009–10	Preliminary round	—		July 28, 2009	

Updated to match played October 18, 2008
Source: Competitions

=== Preseason ===
February 5, 2009	D.C. United	1–4	Vejle Boldklub	Washington, D.C.
	N'Silu 49'	Report	17'; 33'; 44'; 80'	Stadium: Robert F. Kennedy Memorial Stadium

February 10, 2009	D.C. United	2–1	Columbus Crew	Washington, D.C.
				Stadium: Robert F. Kennedy Memorial Stadium

February 21, 2009	Puerto Rico Islanders	1–2	D.C. United	Bayamón, Puerto Rico
	Arrieta (penalty scored)	Report (in Spanish)	Gómez 58'; Simms 65'	Stadium: Juan Ramón Loubriel Stadium

=== Carolina Challenge Cup ===
March 7, 2009	D.C. United	0–3	Real Salt Lake	Charleston, South Carolina
	Jakovic (red card) 24'	Report	Escalada; Movsisyan; Williams	Stadium: Blackbaud Stadium

March 11, 2009	Toronto FC	2–1	D.C. United	Charleston, South Carolina
	Barrett 21'; De Rosario 33'	Report	Pontius 42'	Stadium: Blackbaud Stadium

March 14, 2009	Charleston Battery	0–2	D.C. United	Charleston, South Carolina
		Report	Emilio 57'; Jacobson 82'	Stadium: Blackbaud Stadium

=== Major League Soccer ===
==== Standings ====
Eastern Conference

Pos	Team	Pld	W	L	T	GF	GA	GD	Pts	Qualification
1	Columbus Crew	30	13	7	10	41	31	+10	49	MLS Cup Playoffs
2	Chicago Fire	30	11	7	12	39	34	+5	45	MLS Cup Playoffs
3	New England Revolution	30	11	10	9	33	37	−4	42	MLS Cup Playoffs
4	D.C. United	30	9	8	13	43	44	−1	40	
5	Toronto FC	30	10	11	9	37	46	−9	39	
6	Kansas City Wizards	30	8	13	9	33	42	−9	33	
7	New York Red Bulls	30	5	19	6	27	47	−20	21	

Source: MLS

Overall table

Pos	Team	Pld	W	L	T	GF	GA	GD	Pts	Qualification
1	Columbus Crew (S)	30	13	7	10	41	31	+10	49	CONCACAF Champions League
2	LA Galaxy	30	12	6	12	36	31	+5	48	CONCACAF Champions League
3	Houston Dynamo	30	13	8	9	39	29	+10	48	North American SuperLiga
4	Seattle Sounders FC	30	12	7	11	38	29	+9	47	CONCACAF Champions League
5	Chicago Fire	30	11	7	12	39	34	+5	45	North American SuperLiga
6	Chivas USA	30	13	11	6	34	31	+3	45	North American SuperLiga
7	New England Revolution	30	11	10	9	33	37	−4	42	North American SuperLiga
8	Real Salt Lake (C)	30	11	12	7	43	35	+8	40	CONCACAF Champions League
9	Colorado Rapids	30	10	10	10	42	38	+4	40	
10	D.C. United	30	9	8	13	43	44	−1	40	
11	FC Dallas	30	11	13	6	50	47	+3	39	
12	Toronto FC	30	10	11	9	37	46	−9	39	CONCACAF Champions League
13	Kansas City Wizards	30	8	13	9	33	42	−9	33	
14	San Jose Earthquakes	30	7	14	9	36	50	−14	30	
15	New York Red Bulls	30	5	19	6	27	47	−20	21	

Source: MLS
Rules for classification: 1) points; 2) head-to-head record; 3) goal difference; 4) number of goals scored
(C) Champions; (S) Supporters' Shield

==== Results summary ====
Overall								Home						Away					
Pld	Pts	W	L	T	GF	GA	GD	W	L	T	GF	GA	GD	W	L	T	GF	GA	GD
30	40	9	8	13	43	44	−1	7	3	5	19	14	+5	2	5	8	24	30	−6

Last updated: October 25, 2009
Source: Major League Soccer
Pld = Matches played; Pts = Points; W = Matches won; T = Matches tied; L = Matches lost; GF = Goals for; GA = Goals against; GD = Goal difference

==== Results by round ====
Round	1	2	3	4	5	6	7	8	9	10	11	12	13	14	15	16	17	18	19	20	21	22	23	24	25	26	27	28	29	30
Stadium	A	H	H	A	H	A	H	A	H	A	H	A	H	H	A	A	A	H	A	A	A	H	A	A	H	H	H	H	H	A
Result	T	W	W	L	T	W	W	T	T	T	T	L	W	W	T	L	T	W	T	L	L	T	W	T	W	L	L	L	W	T

Updated to match(es) played on October 25, 2009. Source: D.C. United
A = Away; H = Home; W = Win; L = Loss; T = Tie

=== Match results ===
March 22, 2009	Los Angeles Galaxy	2–2	D.C. United	Carson, California
	Donovan 80' (pen.); Donovan 85'	Report	Gomez 44'; Pontius 62'	Stadium: The Home Depot Center; Attendance: 18,013; Referee: Jair Marrufo

March 28, 2009	D.C. United	1–1	Chicago Fire	Washington, D.C.
	Emilio 7'; Olsen (yellow card) 30'; Jakovic 79'; Burch (yellow card) 91+'	Report	Nyarko 53'	Stadium: Robert F. Kennedy Memorial Stadium; Attendance: 15,895; Referee: Mark Geiger

April 4, 2009	D.C. United	1–0	Houston Dynamo	Washington, D.C.
	Emilio 47'; Moreno (red card) 71'	Report	Barrett (yellow card) 49'; James (yellow card) 86'	Stadium: Robert F. Kennedy Memorial Stadium; Attendance: 12,594; Referee: Baldomero Toledo

April 11, 2009	Real Salt Lake	2–1	D.C. United	Sandy, Utah
	Morales (yellow card) 15'; Wingert (yellow card) 25'; Borchers (yellow card) 35'; Olave 40'; Morales 80'	Report	Emilio 38'; Gomez (yellow card) 39'; Burch (yellow card) 75'; McTavish (yellow card) 91+'	Stadium: Rio Tinto Stadium; Attendance: 11,793; Referee: Kevin Stott

April 17, 2009	D.C. United	1–1	New England Revolution	Washington, D.C.
	Olsen (yellow card) 74'; Olsen 91+'	Report	Joseph 50'; Thompson (yellow card) 74'; Joseph (yellow card) 92+'	Stadium: Robert F. Kennedy Memorial Stadium; Attendance: 14,441; Referee: Jair Marrufo

April 26, 2009	New York Red Bulls	2–3	D.C. United	East Rutherford, New Jersey
	Angel 68'; Richards 74'; Richards (yellow card) 78'	Report	Wallace 21'; Simms (yellow card) 34'; Jacobson (yellow card) 53'; Wallace (yellow card) 68'; Emilio 90'; Pontius 91+'	Stadium: Giants Stadium; Attendance: 10,303; Referee: Steven DePiero

May 2, 2009	D.C. United	2–1	FC Dallas	Washington, D.C.
	Rocha 28'; Cooper (yellow card) 45'; Moreno 65'	Report	Jakovic (yellow card) 62'	Stadium: Robert F. Kennedy Memorial Stadium; Attendance: 14,225; Referee: Ricardo Salazar

May 6, 2009	Kansas City Wizards	1–1	D.C. United	Kansas City, Kansas
	Jewsbury (yellow card) 23'; Wolff 52'; Watson (yellow card) 56'; Espinoza (yellow card) 82'	Report	Wallace 27'; Barklage (yellow card) 29'; John (yellow card) 71'	Stadium: CommunityAmerica Ballpark; Attendance: 9,077; Referee: Edvin Jurisevic

May 9, 2009	D.C. United	3–3	Toronto FC	Washington, D.C.
	N'Silu 9'; Fred (yellow card) 40'; Pontius 86'; Moreno 92+' (pen.); Pontius (yellow card) 94+'	Report	De Rosario 52'; Serioux 63'; De Rosario 87'; Brennan (yellow card) 92+'; De Rosario (yellow card) 94+'	Stadium: RFK Memorial Stadium; Attendance: 15,652; Referee: Baldomero Toledo

May 16, 2009	Chivas USA	2–2	D.C. United	Carson, California
	Galindo 25'; Lillingston 43'; Stepanovic (yellow card) 69'	Report	Simms (yellow card) 36'; Namoff (yellow card) 72'; Emilio 77'; Jakovic (yellow card) 84'; Quaranta 85'	Stadium: The Home Depot Center; Attendance: 16,223; Referee: Mark Geiger

May 23, 2009	D.C. United	0–0	Real Salt Lake	Washington, D.C.
		Report	Russell (yellow card) 37'	Stadium: RFK Memorial Stadium; Attendance: 16,089; Referee: Jorge Gonzalez

May 30, 2009	New England Revolution	2–1	D.C. United	East Rutherford, New Jersey
	Joseph 55'; Heaps (yellow card) 80'; Barnes (yellow card) 84'; Ralston 90' (pen.)	Report	Pontius (yellow card) 21'; Fred 36'; Wallace (yellow card) 46+'; Wicks (yellow card) 81'; McTavish (yellow card) 89'	Stadium: Giants Stadium; Attendance: 15,271; Referee: Hilario Grejeda

June 4, 2009	D.C. United	2–0	New York Red Bulls	Washington, D.C.
	Simms (yellow card) 27'; Quaranta 36'; Emilio (yellow card) 60'; Emilio (red card) 64'; Moreno 93+' (pen.)	Report	Wolyniec (yellow card) 94+'	Stadium: Robert F. Kennedy Memorial Stadium; Attendance: 11,226; Referee: Terry Vaughn

June 13, 2009	D.C. United	2–1	Chicago Fire	Washington, D.C.
	Moreno 24' (pen.); Gomez 41'; Gomez (yellow card) 74'	Report	Busch (yellow card) 22'; Thorrington (yellow card) 27'; Pappa 33'; Conde (yellow card) 40'; Pause (yellow card) 70'	Stadium: Robert F. Kennedy Memorial Stadium; Attendance: 18,369; Referee: Baldomero Toledo

June 17, 2009	Seattle Sounders FC	3–3	D.C. United	Seattle, Washington
19:30 PST	Alonso 38'; Burch 45' (o.g.); Montero 57'	Report	Pontius 34'; Gomez 63'; Jakovic (yellow card) 84'; Marshall 87' (o.g.); Namoff (yellow card) 92+'	Stadium: Qwest Field; Attendance: 29,104; Referee: Ricardo Salazar

June 20, 2009	Colorado Rapids	3–0	D.C. United	Commerce City, Colorado
	Cummings 11'; Gibbs (yellow card) 12'; Cummings 43'; Clark 49'	Report	John (yellow card) 22'; Wallace (yellow card) 53'	Stadium: Dick's Sporting Goods Park; Attendance: 11,416; Referee: Michael Kennedy

July 4, 2009	Columbus Crew	1–1	D.C. United	Columbus, Ohio
	Moreno (yellow card) 12'; Moreno 59'; Ekpo (yellow card) 74'; Lenhart (yellow card) 92+'	Report	Gomez 33'; Olsen (yellow card) 60'; N'Silu (yellow card) 80'	Stadium: Columbus Crew Stadium; Attendance: 14,370; Referee: Baldomero Toledo

July 18, 2009	D.C. United	3–1	Colorado Rapids	Washington, D.C.
	Fred (yellow card) 29'; Moreno 47' (pen.); Namoff 56'; Emilio 61'	Report	Namoff 14' (o.g.); Mastroeni (yellow card) 48'; Casey (yellow card) 84'	Stadium: Robert F. Kennedy Memorial Stadium; Attendance: 18,248; Referee: Ricardo Salazar

July 25, 2009	San Jose Earthquakes	2–2	D.C. United	Santa Clara, California
	Hernandez (yellow card) 22'; Johnson 36'; Glen 62' (pen.)	Report	Gomez 3' (pen.); Gomez 21'; Olsen (yellow card) 60'; Wallace (yellow card) 62'	Stadium: Buck Shaw Stadium; Attendance: 9,022; Referee: Kevin Stott

August 1, 2009	Houston Dynamo	4–3	D.C. United	Houston, Texas
	Davis 36'; Ching 36' 38'; Holden (yellow card) 45' (goal) 66'; Davis (yellow card) 49'	Report	Olsen (yellow card) 20'; Gomez (yellow card) 45'; Emilio 49' 87'; Pontius (yellow card) 73'; Fred 74'	Stadium: Robertson Stadium; Attendance: 14,694; Referee: Ricardo Salazar

August 15, 2009	Toronto FC	2–0	D.C. United	Toronto, Ontario, Canada
	Cronin (yellow card) 17'; Robinson (yellow card) 24'; De Rosario 30'; Sanyang (yellow card) 45'; Brennan (yellow card) 58'; White 66'	(report)	Jakovic (yellow card) 22'; Simms (yellow card) 72'	Stadium: BMO Field; Attendance: 20,638; Referee: Alex Prus

August 22, 2009	D.C. United	0–0	Los Angeles Galaxy	Washington, D.C.
	Olsen (yellow card) 10'; Wallace (yellow card) 68'	Report	Donovan (yellow card) 31'; Magee (yellow card) 54'	Stadium: RFK Memorial Stadium; Attendance: 22,134; Referee: Mark Geiger

August 29, 2009	Chicago Fire	0–1	D.C. United	Bridgeview, Illinois
		Report	Namoff 11'; Burch (yellow card) 36'; Fred (yellow card) 44'; Namoff (yellow card) 53'; Jakovic (yellow card) 94+'	Stadium: Toyota Park; Attendance: 16,324; Referee: Kevin Stott

September 5, 2009	FC Dallas	2–2	D.C. United	Frisco, Texas
	Cunningham 18'; Ferreira 50'; Torres (red card) 57' van den Bergh (yellow card) 62'; McCarty (yellow card) 77'; Benitez (yellow card) 93+'	Report	McTavish (yellow card) 35'; Burch 44'; Moreno 58'; Burch (yellow card) 70'; Fred (yellow card) 93+'	Stadium: Pizza Hut Park; Attendance: 10,219; Referee: Ricardo Salazar

September 9, 2009	D.C. United	1–0	Kansas City Wizards	Washington, D.C.
	Gomez (yellow card) 27'; Emilio 39'; John (yellow card) 84'; Wicks (yellow card) 93+'	Report	Harrington (yellow card) 69'; Besler (yellow card) 74'; Myers (yellow card) 81' (yellow-red card) 86'	Stadium: Robert F. Kennedy Memorial Stadium; Attendance: 8,033; Referee: Terry Vaughn

September 12, 2009	D.C. United	1–2	Seattle Sounders FC	Washington, D.C.
19:30 EST	Wallace 54'; Wallace (yellow card) 57'; Quaranta (yellow card) 62'; John (yellow card) 93+'	Report	Zakuani 5'; Montero 84'	Stadium: RFK Memorial Stadium; Attendance: 19,592; Referee: Silviu Petrescu

September 27, 2009	D.C. United	1–2	San Jose Earthquakes	Washington, D.C.
	Moreno 26'; Wallace (yellow card) 54'; Pontius (yellow card) 68'	Report	McDonald (yellow card) 28'; Sanchez 58'; Johnson 73'	Stadium: Robert F. Kennedy Memorial Stadium; Attendance: 14,375; Referee: Baldomero Toledo

October 3, 2009	D.C. United	0–2	Chivas USA	Washington, D.C.
	Moreno (yellow card) 56'; James (yellow card) 63'; Olsen (red card) 65'; Pontius (yellow card) 84'	Report	Kocic 32' (o.g.); Padilla 53'; Cuesta (yellow card) 65'	Stadium: Robert F. Kennedy Memorial Stadium; Attendance: 24,175; Referee: Kevin Stott

October 17, 2009	D.C. United	1–0	Columbus Crew	Washington, D.C.
	McTavish (yellow card) 6'; Emilio 17'	Report	Renteria (red card) 83'	Stadium: Robert F. Kennedy Memorial Stadium; Attendance: 16,274; Referee: Alex Prus

October 22, 2009	Kansas City Wizards	2–2	D.C. United	Kansas City, Kansas
	Hercegfalvi (yellow card) 25'; Kamara 30'; Marquess (yellow card) 65'; Lopez 92+' (pen.)	Report	Moreno 67'; Olsen (yellow card) 73'; James 82'; Fred (red card) 92+'	Stadium: CommunityAmerica Ballpark; Attendance: 10,385; Referee: Ricardo Salazar

=== CONCACAF Champions League ===
==== Group standings ====
Team	Pld	W	D	L	GF	GA	GD	Pts
(Mexico) Toluca	6	4	1	1	15	4	+11	13
(Honduras) Marathón	6	4	0	2	12	14	−2	12
(United States) D.C. United	6	3	1	2	12	8	+4	10
(Trinidad and Tobago) San Juan Jabloteh	6	0	0	6	4	17	−13	0

==== Preliminary round ====
July 28, 2009 Preliminary	D.C. United (United States)	1–1	(El Salvador) Luis Ángel Firpo	Washington, D.C.
20:00 EDT (UTC-4)	Moreno 42' (pen.)	Report	Benítez 26'	Stadium: RFK Stadium; Attendance: 8,026; Referee: Paúl Delgadillo (Mexico)

August 4, 2009 Preliminary	Luis Ángel Firpo (El Salvador)	1–1 (a.e.t.) (4–5 p)	(United States) D.C. United	San Salvador
20:00 CST (UTC-6)	Franco 39' (pen.)	Report	Gómez 42'	Stadium: Estadio Cuscatlán; Attendance: 11,000; Referee: Óscar Moncada (Honduras)
	Penalties
	Alas (penalty scored); J. Sánchez (penalty scored); Merino (penalty scored); Salazar (penalty missed); C. Sánchez (penalty scored)		(penalty scored) Pontius; (penalty scored) Szetela; (penalty scored) Olsen; (penalty scored) Burch; (penalty scored) Gómez

==== Group stage ====
August 18, 2009 Group stage	Marathón (Honduras)	3–1	(United States) D.C. United	San Pedro Sula, Honduras
22:00	Martínez 23'; Palacios 83'; Berrios 88' (pen.)	Report	Emilio 48'	Stadium: Estadio Olímpico Metropolitano; Attendance: 3,658; Referee: Edward Bonilla (El Salvador)

August 26, 2009 Group stage	D.C. United (United States)	1–3	(Mexico) Toluca	Washington, D.C., United States
20:00	Pontius 47'	Report	Marín 5'; Mancilla 79', 86'	Stadium: RFK Stadium; Attendance: 8,834; Referee: Courtney Campbell (Jamaica)

September 15, 2009 Group stage	San Juan Jabloteh (Trinidad and Tobago)	0–1	(United States) D.C. United	Port of Spain, Trinidad and Tobago
20:00		Report	Gómez 14' (pen.)	Stadium: Hasely Crawford Stadium; Attendance: 2,000; Referee: Trevor Taylor (Barbados)

September 24, 2009 Group stage	D.C. United (United States)	3–0	(Honduras) Marathón	Washington, D.C., United States
20:00	Emilio 47', 71'; Moreno 55'	Report		Stadium: RFK Stadium; Attendance: 5,280; Referee: Silviu Petsrecu (Canada)

September 30, 2009 Group stage	D.C. United (United States)	5–1	(Trinidad and Tobago) San Juan Jabloteh	Washington, D.C., United States
20:00	Gómez 13', 68'; Fred 30'; Khumalo 43', 90'	Report	Britto 83'	Stadium: RFK Stadium; Attendance: 3,411; Referee: German Arredondo (Mexico)

October 20, 2009 Group stage	Toluca (Mexico)	1–1	(United States) D.C. United	Toluca, Mexico
20:00	López 62' (pen.)	Report	Pontius 6'	Stadium: Estadio Nemesio Díez; Referee: Geoffrey Hospedales (Trinidad & Tobago)

=== U.S. Open Cup ===
March 28, 2009 Qualification	D.C. United (Washington, D.C.)	2–0	(Texas) FC Dallas	Washington, D.C.
	Fred 21'; Barklage 66'	Report		Stadium: Robert F. Kennedy Memorial Stadium; Attendance: 5,163; Referee: Jeff Gontarek

May 20, 2009 Qualification	D.C. United (Washington, D.C.)	5–3	(New Jersey) New York Red Bulls	Washington, D.C.
19:00 EDT	Pontius 8', 52'; Khumalo 18'; Barklage 21'; Fred 28'	Report	Richards 44'; Rojas 48', 61' (pen.)	Stadium: Robert F. Kennedy Memorial Stadium; Attendance: 5,056; Referee: Mark Kadlecik

June 30, 2009 Third round	D.C. United (Washington, D.C.)	2–0	(New Jersey) Ocean City Barons	Boyds, Maryland
7:30 pm EDT	Gómez 74'; N'Silu 93'	Report	Brown (yellow card) 67'	Stadium: Maryland SoccerPlex; Attendance: 2,021; Referee: Jeff Gontarek (USA)

July 7, 2009 Quarterfinals	D.C. United (Washington, D.C.)	2–1	(Pennsylvania) Harrisburg City Islanders	Boyds, Maryland
7:30 pm EDT	Khumalo 8'; Jacobson 18'; N'Silu (yellow card) 83'; Gómez (yellow card) 86'	Report	Oduor (red card) 49'; Paterson 64'	Stadium: Maryland SoccerPlex; Attendance: 2,137; Referee: Lee Suckle (USA)

July 21, 2009 Semifinals	D.C. United (Washington, D.C.)	2–1	(New York (state)) Rochester Rhinos	Boyds, Maryland
7:00 pm EDT	Jacobson (yellow card) 39'; Gómez 41' (pen.); John (yellow card) 42'; Khumalo 82'	Report	Gregor (yellow card) 18'; Atieno 68'; Bertz (yellow card) 88'	Stadium: Maryland SoccerPlex; Attendance: 2,457; Referee: Abiodun Okulaja

September 2, 2009 Final	D.C. United (Washington, D.C.)	1–2	(Washington (state)) Seattle Sounders FC	Washington, D.C.
	Wicks (red card) 69'; Simms 89'	Report	Ianni (yellow card) 25'; González (yellow card) 49'; Montero 67'; Vagenas (yellow card) 79'; Levesque 86'	Stadium: RFK Stadium; Attendance: 17,329; Referee: Alex Prus

== Transfers ==
=== In ===
No.	Pos.	Player	Transferred from	Fee/notes	Date	Source
22	MF	(Costa Rica) Rodney Wallace	(United States) Maryland Terrapins	Selected in the 2009 MLS SuperDraft	January 15, 2009	
13	MF	(United States) Chris Pontius	(United States) UC Santa Barbara Gauchos	Selected in the 2009 MLS SuperDraft	January 15, 2009	
1	GK	(Serbia) Miloš Kocić	(United States) Loyola Greyhounds	Selected in the 2009 MLS SuperDraft	January 15, 2009	
	DF	(Jamaica) Lyle Adams	(United States) Wake Forest Demon Deacons (United States) Central Florida Kraze	Selected in the 2009 MLS SuperDraft	January 15, 2009	
24	MF	(United States) Brandon Barklage	(United States) Saint Louis Billikens (United States) Chicago Fire Premier	Selected in the 2009 MLS SuperDraft	January 15, 2009	
8	MF	(United States) Andrew Jacobson	(France) Lorient	Selected in the 2008 MLS SuperDraft	February 10, 2009	
19	DF	(Canada) Dejan Jakovic	(Serbia) Red Star	Free	February 27, 2009	

=== Out ===
No.	Pos.	Player	Transferred to	Fee/notes	Date	Source
24	FW	(United States) Brandon Barklage	TBD	Option declined	November 29, 2011	

=== Loan in ===
No.	Pos.	Player	Loaned from	Start	End	Source

=== Loan out ===
No.	Pos.	Player	Loaned to	Start	End	Source
