= 2009 U.S. Open Cup final =

2009 final of the Lamar Hunt U.S. Open Cup

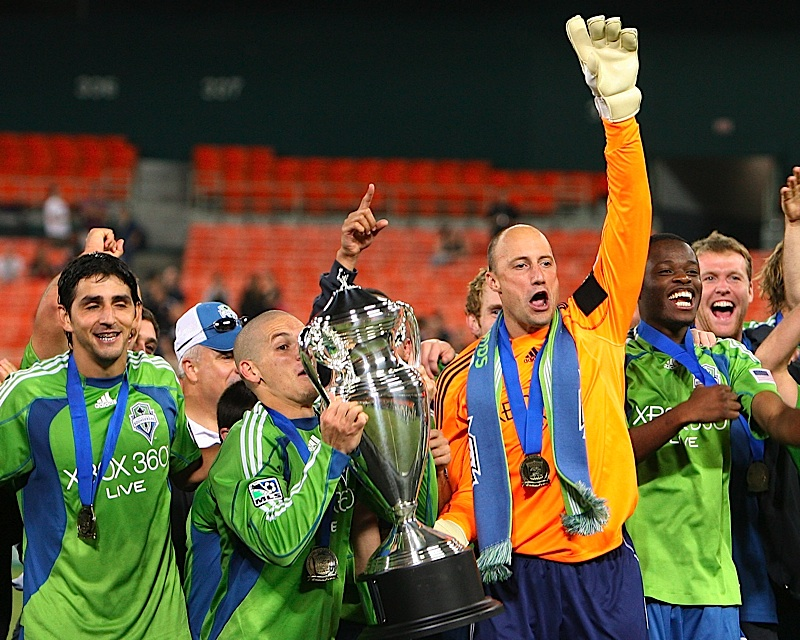
- Sounders FC players lift the U.S. Open Cup trophy after winning the final.
- Event: 2009 U.S. Open Cup
D.C. United	Seattle Sounders FC
MLS	MLS
1	2
- Date: September 2, 2009
- Venue: RFK Stadium, Washington, D.C.
- Man of the Match: Fredy Montero
- Referee: Alex Prus
- Attendance: 17,329
- Weather: Sunny, 73 °F (23 °C)

The 2009 Lamar Hunt U.S. Open Cup final was played on September 2, 2009, at Robert F. Kennedy Memorial Stadium in Washington, D.C. The match determined the winner of the 2009 U.S. Open Cup, a tournament open to amateur and professional soccer teams affiliated with the United States Soccer Federation. This was the 96th edition of the oldest competition in United States soccer. The match was won by Seattle Sounders FC, who defeated D.C. United 2–1. Clyde Simms scored D.C. United's only goal. Fredy Montero and Roger Levesque scored Seattle's two goals as the club became the second expansion team in Major League Soccer (MLS) history to win the tournament in their inaugural season.

D.C. United entered the tournament as the competition's defending champions. They had previously won the tournament in 1996 as well. Both Sounders FC and D.C. United had to play through two qualification rounds for MLS teams before entering the official tournament. Prior to the final, there was a public dispute between the owners of the two clubs regarding the selection of D.C. United to host it at their home field, RFK Stadium.

As the tournament champions, Sounders FC earned a berth in the preliminary round of the 2010–11 CONCACAF Champions League. The club also received a $100,000 cash prize, while D.C. United received $50,000 as the runner-up.

== Road to the final ==
The U.S. Open Cup is an annual American soccer competition open to all United States Soccer Federation affiliated teams, from amateur adult club teams to the professional clubs of Major League Soccer (MLS), which has teams in the United States and Canada. In 2009, Major League Soccer was allowed to enter eight of its U.S.-based teams in the tournament. The top six MLS teams from the previous season qualified automatically, while the remaining two spots were determined by preliminary qualification matches. The eight MLS entries began play in the third round of the tournament.

In 2009, MLS expanded into the Seattle market adding a new team to the league, Seattle Sounders FC. As an expansion team, they had to play through the qualification matches before entering the tournament. Likewise, D.C. United did not finish among the top six 2008 MLS teams, and therefore had to play through qualification rounds before entering the official tournament.

=== Sounders FC ===
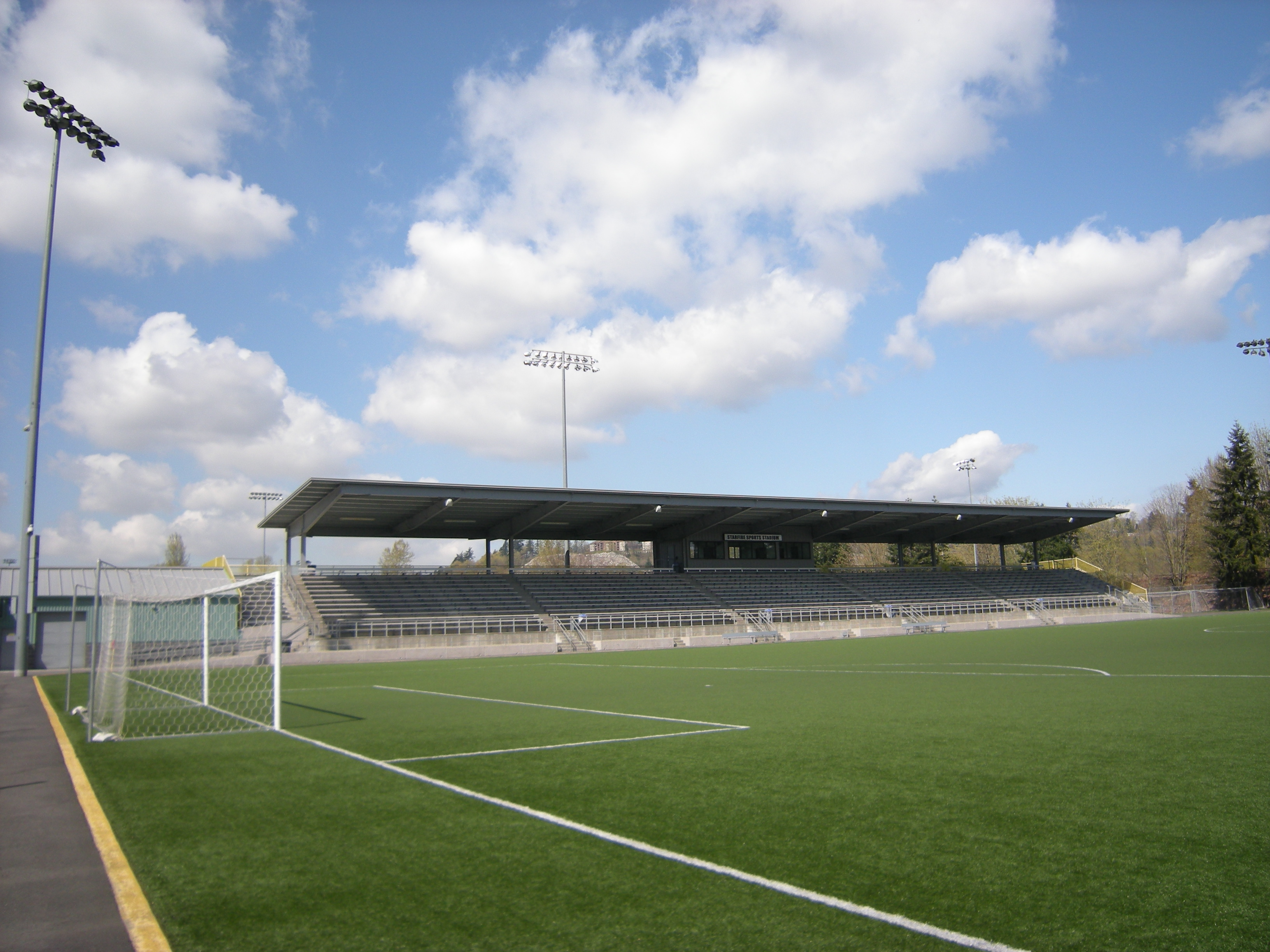
Sounders FC hosted U.S. Open Cup matches at Starfire Sports Complex.

Prior to their first qualification match against Real Salt Lake, Sounders FC coach Sigi Schmid asserted that the U.S. Open Cup was important to the club and that they were playing to win. Sounders FC played U.S. Open Cup home games at the Starfire Sports Complex in Tukwila, Washington. The facility is smaller than the club's home stadium for league matches, Qwest Field, but Sounders FC representatives preferred the atmosphere at Starfire for smaller cup matches.

On April 28, 2009, Sounders FC defeated Real Salt Lake 4–1 in their first qualification match. Sebastian Le Toux scored two goals, and Roger Levesque had three assists in front of a sold-out crowd at Starfire. Sounders FC hosted their second qualification match on May 26, 2009, also at Starfire, this time against the Colorado Rapids. Reserve player Kevin Forrest scored the only goal in the match as Seattle defeated the Rapids 1–0, securing their entry into the third round of the official cup competition as one of the eight teams representing MLS.

On July 1, 2009, Sounders FC traveled to Portland and defeated the Timbers of the USL First Division, the team's historic rival, 2–1 in front of a sold-out crowd. Roger Levesque and Stephen King both scored for Seattle. The following week, in a quarterfinal match at Starfire, Sounders FC defeated visiting Kansas City 1–0 on a penalty kick in the 89th minute scored by Sebastien Le Toux. Three weeks later, on July 21, Sounders FC won their semifinal match 2–1 over the Houston Dynamo at Starfire. Seattle took the lead for good when Stephen King scored a goal five minutes into extra time, sending Sounders FC to the cup final.

=== D.C. United ===
MLS clubs were first included in the U.S. Open Cup tournament in 1996. D.C. United won the tournament that year, and repeated their success in 2008. In 2009, the club began its title defense in the MLS qualification rounds. This meant that they had to win six games instead of the four needed to obtain the cup in 2008.

In their first qualifying match on March 28, 2009, they hosted FC Dallas at RFK Stadium in Washington, D.C. They defeated Dallas 2–0, with Fred and Brandon Barklage scoring in the 21st and 66th minutes, respectively. D.C. United's second qualification match was also played at RFK Stadium, on May 20, 2009. In a high-scoring match against the New York Red Bulls, D.C. won 5–3. Chris Pontius scored two of United's five goals, qualifying D.C. for the third round of the official tournament.

On June 30, 2009, D.C. United began official cup competition against the Ocean City Barons of the USL Premier Development League. The match, hosted by United at Maryland SoccerPlex in Boyds, Maryland, ended with D.C. on top 2–0. As a fourth-tier club, the Barons lineup had featured amateur players while United's included only three regular starters. The match remained scoreless for 74 minutes before D.C. took the lead on a penalty kick by late substitution Christian Gomez. One week later, on July 7, D.C. United hosted their quarterfinal match at the SoccerPlex again and defeated the Harrisburg City Islanders of the USL Second Division 2–1. On July 21, 2009, D.C. United hosted another lower tier team in their semifinal match at the SoccerPlex. This time they defeated the Rochester Rhinos of the USL First Division 2–1. The match was tied 1–1 until the 82nd minute when Boyzzz Khumalo's goal propelled D.C. into the cup final.

== Pre-match ==
=== Venue selection ===
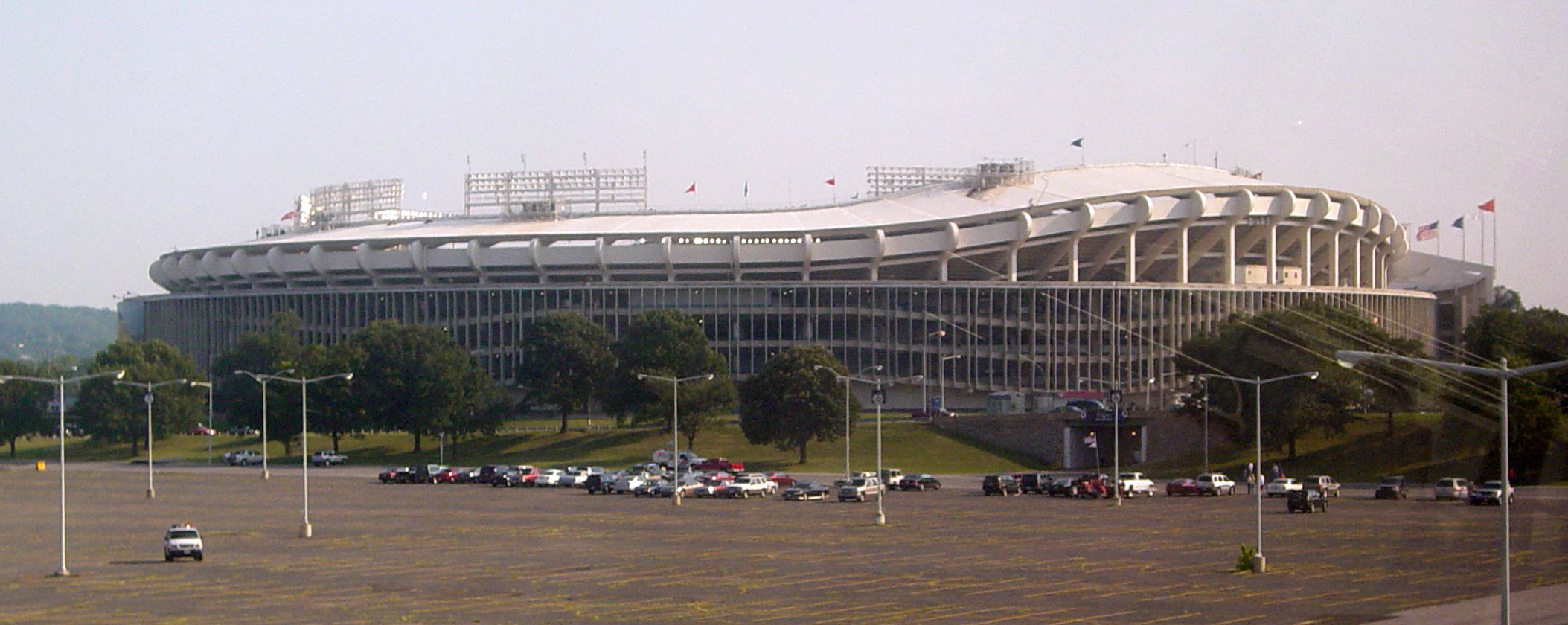
RFK Stadium was selected to host the cup final.

Both Seattle Sounders FC and D.C. United submitted bids to U.S. Soccer to host the final. D.C. United's bid included a proposal to host the match at RFK Stadium, their home stadium in Washington, D.C. with a capacity of 45,596. Sounders FC's bid proposed to host the match at Qwest Field, their home stadium in Seattle, with a capacity of 32,400 for soccer matches. The procedure for selecting the winning bid was kept private. When D.C. United's bid was chosen, Sounders FC general manager Adrian Hanauer expressed skepticism that it had been better than the Seattle bid. He further noted that if Seattle had hosted the match, it likely would have sold out. This prompted a reply from D.C. United president Kevin Payne, who argued that D.C. United had won the bidding process fairly, and said that he was offended by Hanauer's comments. Following this public disagreement, D.C. United launched a marketing campaign to sell more match tickets, which included a new web site, WeWinTrophies.com, which chronicled the club's history of titles as an original MLS franchise. The campaign also included an open letter in local newspapers stating that Sounders FC and its fans did not think D.C. deserved to host the match and declared D.C. fans as "the standard" for support in the league. Videos from local celebrities were posted on the team's official blog urging fans to attend the final. Ticket discounts and special pricing on concessions for the match were also announced as part of the special marketing effort for the cup final.

=== Analysis ===
I think both teams are coming into the game with an attacking mindset and I think the strength of both teams lies in the attacking part of the field. We expect a game that's going to be entertaining and open.

— Sigi Schmid, Seattle Sounders FC Head Coach

Prior to meeting in the U.S. Open Cup final, Sounders FC and D.C. United had met only once, on June 17 at Qwest Field in Seattle. In that meeting, Sounders FC squandered a 3–1 second half lead by allowing D.C. United to score two goals late in the match. It ended in a 3–3 tie.

Since 1996, when MLS teams were first included in the tournament, the home team had won nine times and lost only twice in the final match. Commenting on what his team brings to the game, Sounders FC coach Sigi Schmid stated, "We bring a clean slate. We haven't had any negative experiences in championship games, so we want to just build up a positive legacy for our team and we know we have a chance to make some history for our team. Every player knows that and that's something we want to try and do." D.C. United had previously won the U.S. Open Cup twice in 1996 and 2008 and this was their fourth appearance ever in the tournament final. D.C. United president Kevin Payne simply stated, "We want to win anything we enter."

Sounders FC general manager Adrian Hanauer commented on his club's desire to win the cup and a berth into the CONCACAF Champions League, "That's one step towards our stated goal of competing in the world club championships, because the winner of the CONCACAF Champions League wins a spot in the World Club Championships."

== Match ==
The 2009 U.S. Open Cup Final was played on September 2 at RFK Stadium in Washington D.C. A total of 17,329 fans attended the match, well below the stadium's available capacity. Approximately 200 Sounders FC fans sat together in the upper deck. Both the travel distance and the mid-week scheduling made it difficult for Seattle fans to attend. Live television coverage was provided nationally by Fox Soccer Channel.

=== First half ===
Both clubs had used a mix of reserve players and starting (first choice) players in previous tournament matches, but for the final neither team used reserve players in their starting lineups. Seattle took the field in a 4-4-2 formation while D.C United was in a 3-4-3 formation. The match kicked off at 7:37 pm local time.

Five minutes into the match, D.C. United first-year player Chris Pontius had the first chance of the evening as he pushed past Sounders FC defender Leonardo González to receive a diagonal pass from Clyde Simms. However, due to the difficult shooting angle, Pontius' shot was wide of the far post. In the 10th minute, Sounders FC forward Fredy Montero had a close range shot on goal, but D.C. goalkeeper Josh Wicks parried the shot away. Seven minutes later, Christian Gomez had a goal scoring opportunity with a direct free kick from 28 yards (26 m), but his low kick curled just wide of the target. In the 18th minute, Seattle midfielder Sebastian Le Toux played a ball in to teammate Freddie Ljungberg, whose shot on goal was barely saved by Wicks, who kicked out a foot to block the shot. Just before halftime, Le Toux crossed to an unmarked Montero, whose direct header on goal was just in reach of Wicks, who again made the save to keep the score level, 0–0. Seattle outshot D.C. 9–6 in the first half.

=== Second half ===
As the players took the field for the second half, D.C. coach Tom Soehn decided to replace Fred, who had been a non-factor in the first half, with Santino Quaranta. In the 60th minute, Gomez, Pontius and Luciano Emilio combined inside Seattle's 18-yard box for a United opportunity, but Pontius mishit the shot, which resulted in an easy save for Seattle's goalkeeper, Kasey Keller. Seven minutes later, another failed D.C. United opportunity resulted in a Sounders FC counterattack, where Freddie Ljungberg's shot was saved by Wicks. The rebound rolled in front of Fredy Montero, who dove feet first and kicked the ball into the goal, giving Sounders FC a 1–0 lead. Following the goal, frustrated D.C. United goalkeeper Josh Wicks stomped on Montero's leg while he was still on the ground. After consulting with the fourth official, referee Alex Prus showed Wicks a red card for his behavior, dismissing him from the match. United's backup goalkeeper, Milos Kocic, was substituted for Christian Gomez after the incident, and D.C. played with 10 men for the remainder of the match.

Despite being down a man, D.C. United controlled possession of the ball as the match progressed towards full-time. Just four minutes before full-time, Seattle's Sebastian Le Toux pushed D.C. defender Dejan Jakovic off the ball, dribbled in towards goal, and then provided a centering pass to teammate Roger Levesque who scored, extending the Seattle lead to 2–0. With time ticking away, United desperately threw every man forward and managed to narrow the scoring difference to one in the 89th minute when Simms kicked home a loose ball after a Quaranta free kick. During the five minutes of stoppage time, D.C. continued with repeated crosses and shots attempting to get an equalizer.

In the end, Sounders FC was able to withstand D.C.'s late push for a 2–1 victory, becoming the second MLS expansion team in league history (Chicago Fire was the first) to win the U.S. Open Cup in their inaugural season. Players and coaches ran onto the field after the final whistle, jumped up and down together and hurried to a corner of the field to acknowledge the Sounders FC fans cheering in the upper deck.

=== Match details ===
September 2, 2009
19:30 EDT

D.C. United	1–2	Seattle Sounders FC
Simms 89'	Report	Montero 67'; Levesque 86'

RFK Stadium
Washington, D.C.
Attendance: 17,329

D.C. United	Seattle Sounders FC

D.C. United:
GK	31	Josh Wicks	(red card) 69'
DF	26	Bryan Namoff
DF	5	Dejan Jakovic
DF	4	Marc Burch
MF	10	Christian Gomez		(substituted off) 71'
MF	14	Ben Olsen		(substituted off) 82'
MF	19	Clyde Simms
MF	7	Fred		(substituted off) 46'
MF	13	Chris Pontius
FW	11	Luciano Emilio
FW	99	Jaime Moreno (c)
Substitutes:
GK	1	Milos Kocic		(substituted on) 71'
DF	3	Avery John
MF	8	Andrew Jacobson
MF	12	Danny Szetela
DF	18	Devon McTavish
MF	22	Rodney Wallace		(substituted on) 82'
MF	25	Santino Quaranta		(substituted on) 46'
Manager:
Tom Soehn

Seattle Sounders FC:
GK	18	Kasey Keller (c)
DF	7	James Riley
DF	4	Patrick Ianni	(yellow card) 25'
DF	5	Tyson Wahl
DF	19	Leonardo González	(yellow card) 49'
MF	10	Freddie Ljungberg
MF	6	Osvaldo Alonso
MF	8	Peter Vagenas	(yellow card) 79'
MF	11	Steve Zakuani		(substituted off) 74'
FW	9	Sebastien Le Toux
FW	17	Fredy Montero		(substituted off) 78'
Substitutes:
GK	28	Terry Boss
MF	3	Brad Evans		(substituted on) 78'
DF	12	Nathan Sturgis
DF	20	Zach Scott
FW	21	Nate Jaqua
FW	24	Roger Levesque		(substituted on) 74'
MF	27	Lamar Neagle
Manager:
Sigi Schmid

Man of the Match:
Fredy Montero

Referee:
Alex Prus
Assistant referees:
Greg Barkey
Rob Fereday
Fourth official:
Andrew Chapin

=== Statistics ===
Overall

	D.C. United	Sounders FC
Goals scored	1	2
Total shots	18	15
Shots on target	7	7
Saves	5	6
Corner kicks	5	5
Fouls committed	4	13
Offsides	1	2
Yellow cards	0	3
Red cards	1	0

== Post match ==
In the post-game press conference, Josh Wicks discussed his ejection, saying: "It was a mistake on my part and I've got to learn my lesson. The fourth official made a call and the ref made the final decision. That was it. I've got no excuses for it. Tremendously, very, very disappointing." One month after the stomping incident, U.S. Soccer announced that Wicks would be suspended from the U.S. Open Cup tournament for five matches.

After the victory, many Sounders FC fans gathered at King County International Airport to greet the team as they returned to Seattle. The trophy was put on display at several events around Seattle in the weeks following Sounders FC's victory. On September 19, the cup was presented to Sounders FC fans to carry in the March to the Match prior to a Sounders FC league game at Qwest Field against Chivas USA.

By winning the U.S. Open Cup tournament, Sounders FC earned a berth in the preliminary round of the 2010–11 CONCACAF Champions League. Seattle also received the winner's $100,000 cash prize, while D.C. United received $50,000 as the tournament runner-up. Kevin Forrest, whose game-winning goal against Colorado allowed Sounders FC to qualify for the tournament, received a share of the prize money and a medal, despite being released by the team before the final.

In January 2010, the club's success in the U.S. Open Cup tournament was listed among the many reasons the Washington State Senate passed a resolution honoring Sounders FC.

On October 5, 2010, Seattle returned to the final and defeated the Columbus Crew 2–1 to repeat as U.S. Open Cup champion. This time Sounders FC hosted the final at Qwest Field, drawing an attendance of 31,311 which broke the 81-year-old record for the event.
