= List of Major League Soccer transfers 2009 =

The following is a list of transfers for the 2009 Major League Soccer season. Seattle Sounders FC, a new expansion team, signed four players during the 2008 season, however their transfers are listed on this page for clarity. David Beckham's loan to Milan was also made during the 2008 season. The rest of the transfers were made during the 2008–09 offseason all the way through to the MLS transfer deadline on August 31, 2009.

== Transfers ==
Date	Name	Moving from	Moving to	Mode of Transfer
May 8, 2008	(France) Sébastien Le Toux	(United States) Seattle Sounders	Seattle Sounders FC	Free
August 14, 2008	(United States) Kasey Keller	Unattached	Seattle Sounders FC	Free
September 5, 2008	(The Gambia) Sanna Nyassi	Unattached	Seattle Sounders FC	Free
October 24, 2008	(England) David Beckham	Los Angeles Galaxy	(Italy) Milan	Loan
October 24, 2008	(Sweden) Freddie Ljungberg	Unattached	Seattle Sounders FC	Free
November 14, 2008	(Brazil) Fred	D.C. United	(New Zealand) Wellington Phoenix	Loan
November 19, 2008	(United States) Hunter Freeman	Toronto FC	(Norway) Start	Free
November 20, 2008	(United States) Landon Donovan	Los Angeles Galaxy	(Germany) Bayern Munich	Loan
November 22, 2008	(Mexico) Cuauhtémoc Blanco	Chicago Fire	(Mexico) Santos Laguna	Loan
November 24, 2008	(United States) Adam Cristman	New England Revolution	Kansas City Wizards	Trade
November 24, 2008	(United States) Jovan Kirovski	San Jose Earthquakes	Los Angeles Galaxy	Trade
November 24, 2008	(Colombia) Jámison Olave	(Colombia) Deportivo Cali	Real Salt Lake	Undisclosed
November 26, 2008	(United States) Mike Petke	Unattached	New York Red Bulls	Free
November 28, 2008	(United States) Brad Evans	Columbus Crew	Seattle Sounders FC	Expansion Draft
November 28, 2008	(United States) Nate Jaqua	Houston Dynamo	Seattle Sounders FC	Expansion Draft
November 28, 2008	(United States) Stephen King	Chicago Fire	Seattle Sounders FC	Expansion Draft
November 28, 2008	(United States) Jeff Parke	New York Red Bulls	Seattle Sounders FC	Expansion Draft
November 28, 2008	(United States) James Riley	San Jose Earthquakes	Seattle Sounders FC	Expansion Draft
November 28, 2008	(New Zealand) Jarrod Smith	Toronto FC	Seattle Sounders FC	Expansion Draft
November 28, 2008	(Bermuda) Khano Smith	New England Revolution	Seattle Sounders FC	Expansion Draft
November 28, 2008	(United States) Nathan Sturgis	Real Salt Lake	Seattle Sounders FC	Expansion Draft
November 28, 2008	(United States) Peter Vagenas	Los Angeles Galaxy	Seattle Sounders FC	Expansion Draft
November 28, 2008	(United States) Tyson Wahl	Kansas City Wizards	Seattle Sounders FC	Expansion Draft
December 8, 2008	(United States) Michael Parkhurst	New England Revolution	(Denmark) Nordsjælland	Free
December 12, 2008	(Canada) Dwayne De Rosario	Houston Dynamo	Toronto FC	Trade
December 12, 2008	(Trinidad and Tobago) Julius James	Toronto FC	Houston Dynamo	Trade
December 23, 2008	(Poland) Tomasz Frankowski	Chicago Fire	(Poland) Jagiellonia Białystok	Free
December 23, 2008	(Jamaica) Donovan Ricketts	(Jamaica) Village United	Los Angeles Galaxy	Undisclosed
December 28, 2008	(United States) Michael Videira	Unattached	New England Revolution	Free
January 6, 2009	(Mexico) Duilio Davino	FC Dallas	(Mexico) Puebla	Free
January 6, 2009	(United States) Chris Eylander	Unattached	Seattle Sounders FC	Free
January 7, 2009	(United States) Leonard Griffin	(United States) Portland Timbers	Los Angeles Galaxy	Undisclosed
January 9, 2009	(Brazil) Stefani Miglioranzi	Columbus Crew	Los Angeles Galaxy	Trade
January 13, 2009	(United States) Ty Harden	Los Angeles Galaxy	Colorado Rapids	Trade
January 13, 2009	(Senegal) Macoumba Kandji	(United States) Atlanta Silverbacks	New York Red Bulls	Undisclosed
January 13, 2009	(Mexico) Roberto Nurse	Chivas USA	(Mexico) Veracruz	Free
January 13, 2009	(Ghana) Dominic Oduro	FC Dallas	New York Red Bulls	Trade
January 13, 2009	(Netherlands) Dave van den Bergh	New York Red Bulls	FC Dallas	Trade
January 15, 2009	(Canada) Ante Jazić	Los Angeles Galaxy	Chivas USA	Trade
January 15, 2009	(Ukraine) Dema Kovalenko	Real Salt Lake	Los Angeles Galaxy	Trade
January 15, 2009	(United States) Mike Magee	New York Red Bulls	Los Angeles Galaxy	Trade
January 15, 2009	(United States) Matt Pickens	Chicago Fire	Colorado Rapids	Trade
January 15, 2009	(El Salvador) Steve Purdy	(Germany) 1860 Munich	FC Dallas	Undisclosed
January 16, 2009	(Mexico) Francisco Mendoza	Chivas USA	(Mexico) Guadalajara	Free
January 19, 2009	(Scotland) Kenny Deuchar	Real Salt Lake	(Scotland) Hamilton Academical	Free
January 20, 2009	(Brazil) Francisco Lima	San Jose Earthquakes	(Italy) Taranto Sport	Free
January 21, 2009	(Argentina) Fabián Espíndola	Real Salt Lake	(Venezuela) Deportivo Anzoátegui	Free
January 21, 2009	(United States) Taylor Graham	Unattached	Seattle Sounders FC	Free
January 22, 2009	(Argentina) Gonzalo Peralta	D.C. United	(Argentina) Unión Santa Fe	Loan
January 23, 2009	(United States) Tally Hall	(Denmark) Esbjerg	Houston Dynamo	Free
January 23, 2009	(Colombia) Fredy Montero	(Colombia) Deportivo Cali	Seattle Sounders FC	Loan
January 26, 2009	(United States) Patrick Ianni	Houston Dynamo	Seattle Sounders FC	Trade
January 27, 2009	(Cuba) Osvaldo Alonso	(United States) Charleston Battery	Seattle Sounders FC	Undisclosed
January 27, 2009	(Costa Rica) Daniel Torres	(Norway) Bryne	FC Dallas	Undisclosed
January 30, 2009	(Argentina) Marcelo Gallardo	D.C. United	(Argentina) River Plate	Free
January 31, 2009	(United States) Felix Garcia	(United States) Laredo Heat	Houston Dynamo	Undisclosed
January 31, 2009	(Guatemala) Carlos Ruiz	Toronto FC	(Paraguay) Olimpia Asunción	Free
February 2, 2009	(Trinidad and Tobago) Scott Sealy	San Jose Earthquakes	(Israel) Maccabi Tel Aviv	Free
February 3, 2009	(United States) Todd Dunivant	Toronto FC	Los Angeles Galaxy	Trade
February 5, 2009	(United States) Cam Weaver	(Norway) Haugesund	San Jose Earthquakes	Undisclosed
February 9, 2009	(Brazil) Pablo Campos	(Sweden) GAIS	San Jose Earthquakes	Undisclosed
February 9, 2009	(Argentina) Christian Gómez	Colorado Rapids	D.C. United	Trade
February 9, 2009	(United States) Mike Graczyk	Colorado Rapids	D.C. United	Trade
February 9, 2009	(Honduras) Iván Guerrero	D.C. United	Colorado Rapids	Trade
February 9, 2009	(Argentina) Pablo Vitti	(Argentina) Independiente	Toronto FC	Loan
February 10, 2009	(United States) Bobby Convey	Unattached	San Jose Earthquakes	Free
February 10, 2009	(Jamaica) Tyrone Marshall	Toronto FC	Seattle Sounders FC	Trade
February 10, 2009	(United States) Daniel Paladini	Chivas USA	(United States) Carolina RailHawks	Free
February 11, 2009	(Argentina) Santiago Hirsig	(Argentina) San Lorenzo	Kansas City Wizards	Undisclosed
February 11, 2009	(United States) Andrew Weber	Unattached	San Jose Earthquakes	Free
February 12, 2009	(Bermuda) Khano Smith	Seattle Sounders FC	New York Red Bulls	Trade
February 18, 2009	(Colombia) Jhon Kennedy Hurtado	(Colombia) Deportivo Cali	Seattle Sounders FC	Undisclosed
February 24, 2009	(Colombia) David Ferreira	(Brazil) Atlético Paranaense	FC Dallas	Loan
February 24, 2009	(Democratic Republic of the Congo) Ange N'Silu	(Switzerland) Le Mont	D.C. United	Undisclosed
February 24, 2009	(Canada) Adrian Serioux	FC Dallas	Toronto FC	Trade
February 27, 2009	(Canada) Dejan Jakovic	(Serbia) Red Star Belgrade	D.C. United	Undisclosed
February 27, 2009	(Guyana) Gregory Richardson	Toronto FC	Colorado Rapids	Trade
March 2, 2009	(United States) Steve Cronin	Los Angeles Galaxy	(United States) Portland Timbers	Free
March 2, 2009	(United States) Chris Leitch	New York Red Bulls	San Jose Earthquakes	Trade
March 3, 2009	(The Gambia) Emmanuel Gómez	(The Gambia) Samger FC	Toronto FC	Free
March 3, 2009	(United States) Ned Grabavoy	Unattached	Real Salt Lake	Free
March 3, 2009	(The Gambia) Amadou Sanyang	(The Gambia) Real de Banjul	Toronto FC	Free
March 10, 2009	(Spain) Albert Celades	(Spain) Real Zaragoza	New York Red Bulls	Free
March 10, 2009	(United States) Josh Wicks	Los Angeles Galaxy	D.C. United	Trade
March 11, 2009	(United States) Scott Palguta	(United States) Rochester Rhinos	Colorado Rapids	Undisclosed
March 12, 2009	(Mexico) Eduardo Lillingston	(Mexico) Tecos UAG	Chivas USA	Undisclosed
March 12, 2009	(Puerto Rico) Josh Saunders	(United States) Miami FC	Los Angeles Galaxy	Undisclosed
March 16, 2009	(United States) Roger Levesque	Unattached	Seattle Sounders FC	Free
March 16, 2009	(United States) Zach Scott	Unattached	Seattle Sounders FC	Free
March 17, 2009	(United States) Mike Zaher	D.C. United	San Jose Earthquakes	Trade
March 18, 2009	(United States) Eric Brunner	New York Red Bulls	Columbus Crew	Trade
March 18, 2009	(United States) Tim Ward	Unattached	Chicago Fire	Free
March 19, 2009	(New Zealand) Simon Elliott	Unattached	San Jose Earthquakes	Free
March 19, 2009	(Costa Rica) Carlos Johnson	(Norway) Bryne	New York Red Bulls	Free
March 19, 2009	(United States) Tony Sanneh	Unattached	Los Angeles Galaxy	Free
March 19, 2009	(Mexico) Mariano Trujillo	(Mexico) Atlante	Chivas USA	Undisclosed
March 20, 2009	(United States) Brandon McDonald	Unattached	San Jose Earthquakes	Free
March 21, 2009	(Costa Rica) Álvaro Sánchez	(Costa Rica) San Carlos	FC Dallas	Loan
March 24, 2009	(United States) Kevin Forrest	Unattached	Seattle Sounders FC	Free
March 25, 2009	(United States) Mike Graczyk	D.C. United	San Jose Earthquakes	Trade
March 26, 2009	(Cameroon) Stephane Assengue	(Cameroon) Daga Young Stars	New England Revolution	Free
March 27, 2009	(United States) John DiRaimondo	Unattached	D.C. United	Free
March 27, 2009	(Serbia) Bojan Stepanović	(Serbia) Srem	Chivas USA	Free
March 31, 2009	(Ghana) Emmanuel Osei	(Ghana) Liberty Professionals	New England Revolution	Free
March 31, 2009	(United States) Jeff Parke	Seattle Sounders FC	(Canada) Vancouver Whitecaps	Free
April 3, 2009	(United States) Gregg Berhalter	(Germany) 1860 Munich	Los Angeles Galaxy	Free
April 6, 2009	(Nigeria) Ade Akinbiyi	(England) Burnley	Houston Dynamo	Free
April 14, 2009	(Canada) André Hainault	(Czech Republic) Baník Most	Houston Dynamo	Undisclosed
April 15, 2009	(Argentina) Fabián Espíndola	(Venezuela) Deportivo Anzoátegui	Real Salt Lake	Undisclosed
April 17, 2009	(France) Julien Baudet	(England) Crewe Alexandra	Colorado Rapids	Free
April 17, 2009	(United States) Kyle Davies	(England) Southampton	Real Salt Lake	Free
April 17, 2009	(El Salvador) Alfredo Pacheco	(El Salvador) FAS	New York Red Bulls	Loan ($30k)
April 23, 2009	(Trinidad and Tobago) Avery John	New England Revolution	D.C. United	Trade
April 28, 2009	(United States) Kyle Davies	Real Salt Lake	FC Dallas	Trade
April 28, 2009	(United States) Aaron Pitchkolan	FC Dallas	San Jose Earthquakes	Trade
May 6, 2009	(United States) Nico Colaluca	Colorado Rapids	New England Revolution	Trade
May 6, 2009	(United States) Rob Valentino	New England Revolution	Colorado Rapids	Trade
May 18, 2009	(Trinidad and Tobago) Cornell Glen	(Trinidad and Tobago) San Juan Jabloteh	San Jose Earthquakes	Undisclosed
May 27, 2009	(Ghana) Dominic Oduro	New York Red Bulls	Houston Dynamo	Trade
June 9, 2009	(United States) Nick Garcia	San Jose Earthquakes	Toronto FC	Trade
June 9, 2009	(United States) Cam Weaver	San Jose Earthquakes	Houston Dynamo	Trade
June 9, 2009	(United States) Chris Wondolowski	Houston Dynamo	San Jose Earthquakes	Trade
June 12, 2009	(Canada) António Ribeiro	Unattached	San Jose Earthquakes	Free
June 15, 2009	(United States) Pat Noonan	Columbus Crew	Colorado Rapids	Trade
June 23, 2009	(Canada) Ali Gerba	(England) Milton Keynes Dons	Toronto FC	Free
June 24, 2009	(Canada) Kevin Harmse	Toronto FC	Chivas USA	Trade
June 26, 2009	(Puerto Rico) Terry Boss	Unattached	Seattle Sounders FC	Free
June 29, 2009	(Senegal) Bouna Coundoul	Unattached	New York Red Bulls	Free
July 1, 2009	(United States) Alecko Eskandarian	Chivas USA	Los Angeles Galaxy	Trade
July 1, 2009	(Lithuania) Edgaras Jankauskas	(Lithuania) REO LT Vilnius	New England Revolution	Free
July 2, 2009	(Costa Rica) Leonardo González	(Costa Rica) Municipal Liberia	Seattle Sounders FC	Undisclosed
July 8, 2009	(Trinidad and Tobago) Chris Birchall	(England) Brighton & Hove Albion	Los Angeles Galaxy	Free
July 13, 2009	(United States) Leonard Krupnik	(Israel) Maccabi Haifa	New York Red Bulls	Undisclosed
July 15, 2009	(Brazil) Pablo Campos	San Jose Earthquakes	Real Salt Lake	Trade
July 16, 2009	(Austria) Ernst Öbster	(Austria) Red Bull Salzburg	New York Red Bulls	Undisclosed
July 16, 2009	(United States) Danny Szetela	(Spain) Racing Santander	D.C. United	Free
July 17, 2009	(Saint Kitts and Nevis) Atiba Harris	Chivas USA	FC Dallas	Trade
July 17, 2009	(Brazil) Marcelo Saragosa	FC Dallas	Chivas USA	Trade
July 24, 2009	(United States) Ely Allen	(United States) Seattle Wolves	D.C. United	Free
July 24, 2009	(Argentina) Facundo Diz	(Argentina) Platense	Colorado Rapids	Free
July 24, 2009	(El Salvador) Ramón Sánchez	(El Salvador) Alianza	San Jose Earthquakes	Undisclosed
July 28, 2009	(Hungary) Zoltán Hercegfalvi	(Hungary) Budapest Honvéd	Kansas City Wizards	Free
July 29, 2009	(Netherlands) Rachid El Khalifi	(Netherlands) SC Cambuur	Real Salt Lake	Free
July 29, 2009	(Scotland) Jamie Smith	(Scotland) Aberdeen	Colorado Rapids	Free
July 31, 2009	(United States) Kenny Cooper	FC Dallas	(Germany) 1860 Munich	Undisclosed
July 31, 2009	(Brazil) André Luiz	(Mexico) Jaguares	San Jose Earthquakes	Free
August 12, 2009	(Haiti) Lesly Fellinga	(Netherlands) SC Heerenveen	Toronto FC	Undisclosed
August 13, 2009	(Argentina) Nelson González	(Argentina) Quilmes	Real Salt Lake	Loan
August 14, 2009	(United States) Ryan Cochrane	San Jose Earthquakes	Houston Dynamo	Trade
August 14, 2009	(Burundi) David Habarugira	(Belgium) Anderlecht	D.C. United	Undisclosed
August 14, 2009	(Trinidad and Tobago) Julius James	Houston Dynamo	D.C. United	Trade
August 14, 2009	(Colombia) Yamith Cuesta	(Colombia) Expreso Rojo	Chivas USA	Loan
August 17, 2009	(Argentina) Walter García	Unattached	New York Red Bulls	Free
August 18, 2009	(Honduras) Marvin Chávez	(Honduras) Marathón	FC Dallas	Loan
August 18, 2009	(Mexico) Jesús Padilla	(Mexico) Guadalajara	Chivas USA	Loan
August 19, 2009	(Venezuela) Emilio Rentería	(Venezuela) Caracas	Columbus Crew	Free
August 20, 2009	(Mexico) Luis Ángel Landín	(Mexico) Morelia	Houston Dynamo	Loan
August 21, 2009	(Brazil) Maicon Santos	(Brazil) Bonsucesso	Chivas USA	Loan
August 28, 2009	(Mali) Bakary Soumare	Chicago Fire	(France) Boulogne	$2.14m
August 31, 2009	(United States) Ugo Ihemelu	Colorado Rapids	FC Dallas	Trade
August 31, 2009	(United States) Drew Moor	FC Dallas	Colorado Rapids	Trade

== Notes and references ==
- "MLS Transfer List". Fox Sports. 25 August 2009. Archived from the original on 9 September 2009.
