= 2009 Major League Soccer season =

14th season of Major League Soccer

Major League Soccer
- Season: 2009
- Teams: 15
- MLS Cup: Real Salt Lake (1st title)
- Supporters' Shield: Columbus Crew (3rd shield)
- Champions League: Columbus Crew; Real Salt Lake; Los Angeles Galaxy; Seattle Sounders FC
- SuperLiga: Houston Dynamo; Chicago Fire; Chivas USA; New England Revolution
- Matches: 226
- Goals: 571 (2.53 per match)
- Top goalscorer: Jeff Cunningham; FC Dallas; Goals: 17
- Biggest home win: RSL 6–0 NE (April 25); DAL 6–0 KC (August 1)
- Biggest away win: CHI 0–3 DAL (May 31); SJ 0–3 CLB (August 8)
- Highest scoring: LA 3–6 DAL (September 12)
- Longest winning run: 5 wins: Houston Dynamo (May 23 – Jun 13); Columbus Crew (Jul 18 – Aug 15)
- Longest unbeaten run: 11 matches: Chicago Fire (Mar 21 – May 28); Houston Dynamo (Apr 11 – Jun 20)
- Longest winless run: 13 matches: New York Red Bulls (May 16 – Aug 15)
- Longest losing run: 6 losses: New York Red Bulls (Jun 24 – Aug 15)
- Highest attendance: CLB @ SJ: 61,572
- Lowest attendance: SJ @ DAL: 5,724
- Total attendance: 3,562,847
- Average attendance: 16,037

Locations of teams for the 2009 Major League Soccer season
Western Conference Eastern Conference

The 2009 Major League Soccer season was the 14th season of Major League Soccer. It was also the 97th season of FIFA-sanctioned soccer in the United States, and the 31st with a national first-division league.

The Seattle Sounders FC debuted as the league's 15th club and were the second team in history to qualify for the MLS Cup Playoffs in their inaugural season. The club set a league record for attendance and averaged 30,943 per regular season match at Qwest Field.

After three seasons, the MLS Reserve League was discontinued. As a result, each team's Developmental Roster spots were reduced from 10 to four, and each team's Senior Roster spots were increased from 18 to 20. This reduced each team's total roster from 28 to 24 players.

The regular season began on March 19, and concluded on October 25. The 2009 MLS Cup Playoffs began on October 29, and concluded with MLS Cup 2009 on November 22. Real Salt Lake won their first MLS Cup by defeating the Los Angeles Galaxy in a penalty shootout.

== Overview ==
=== Season format ===
The season began on March 19 and concluded with MLS Cup on November 22. The 15 teams were split into two conferences with 7 playing in the Eastern Conference and 8 playing in the Western Conference. Each team played 30 games that were evenly divided between home and away. Each team played every other team twice, home and away, for a total of 28 games. The remaining two games were played against four regional rivals, one at home and one away.

The top two teams from each conference automatically qualified for the MLS Cup Playoffs. In addition, the four highest remaining point totals, regardless of conference, also qualified. In the first round, aggregate goals over two matches determined the winners. The conference finals were played as a single match, and the winners advanced to MLS Cup. In all rounds, draws were broken with two 15-minute periods of extra time, followed by penalty kicks if necessary. The away goals rule was not used in any round.

The team with the most points in the regular season was awarded the MLS Supporters' Shield and qualified for the CONCACAF Champions League. Additionally, the winner of MLS Cup, and the runner-up, also qualified for the CONCACAF Champions League. An additional berth in the Champions League was also awarded to the winner of the U.S. Open Cup. If a team qualified for multiple berths into the Champions League, then additional berths were awarded to the highest overall finishing MLS team(s) not already qualified. Also, Toronto FC, as a Canadian-based team, could not qualify for the CONCACAF Champions League through MLS, and had to instead qualify through the Canadian Championship.

Automatic qualification for the U.S. Open Cup was awarded to the top six overall finishers. The rest of the U.S.-based MLS teams had to qualify for the remaining two berths via a series of play-in games.

Qualification for the SuperLiga was awarded to the top four overall finishers not already qualified for the CONCACAF Champions League.

=== Stadiums and locations ===
Team	Stadium	Capacity
Chicago Fire	Toyota Park	20,000
Chivas USA	Home Depot Center	27,000
Colorado Rapids	Dick's Sporting Goods Park	18,061
Columbus Crew	Columbus Crew Stadium	22,555
D.C. United	RFK Stadium	46,000
FC Dallas	Pizza Hut Park	21,193
Houston Dynamo	Robertson Stadium	32,000
Kansas City Wizards	CommunityAmerica Ballpark	10,385
LA Galaxy	Home Depot Center	27,000
New England Revolution	Gillette Stadium	68,756
New York Red Bulls	Giants Stadium	80,200
Real Salt Lake	Rio Tinto Stadium	20,213
San Jose Earthquakes	Buck Shaw Stadium	10,525
Seattle Sounders FC	Qwest Field	68,740
Toronto FC	BMO Field	21,566

=== Personnel and sponsorships ===
Team	Head coach	Captain	Shirt sponsor
Chicago Fire	(Costa Rica) Denis Hamlett	(United States) C. J. Brown	Best Buy
Chivas USA	(United States) Preki	(Mexico) Claudio Suárez	Comex
Colorado Rapids	(England) Gary Smith	(United States) Pablo Mastroeni	—
Columbus Crew	(Poland) Robert Warzycha	(United States) Frankie Hejduk	Glidden
D.C. United	(United States) Tom Soehn	(Bolivia) Jaime Moreno	Volkswagen
FC Dallas	(United States) Schellas Hyndman	(Argentina) Pablo Ricchetti	—
Houston Dynamo	(United States) Dominic Kinnear	(United States) Wade Barrett	—
Kansas City Wizards	(United States) Curt Onalfo	(United States) Jimmy Conrad	—
LA Galaxy	(United States) Bruce Arena	(United States) Landon Donovan	Herbalife
New England Revolution	(Scotland) Steve Nicol	(United States) Steve Ralston	—
New York Red Bulls	(Colombia) Juan Carlos Osorio	(Colombia) Juan Pablo Ángel	Red Bull
Real Salt Lake	(United States) Jason Kreis	(United States) Kyle Beckerman	XanGo
San Jose Earthquakes	(Canada) Frank Yallop	(United States) Ramiro Corrales	Amway Global
Seattle Sounders FC	(United States) Sigi Schmid	(United States) Kasey Keller	Xbox
Toronto FC	(England) John Carver	(Canada) Jim Brennan	—

== Results table ==
Abbreviation and Color Key: Chicago Fire – CHI • Chivas USA – CHV • Colorado Rapids – COL • Columbus Crew – CLB • D.C. United – DC FC Dallas – DAL • Houston Dynamo – HOU • Kansas City Wizards – KC • Los Angeles Galaxy – LA • New England Revolution – NE New York Red Bulls – NY • Real Salt Lake – RSL • San Jose Earthquakes – SJ • Seattle Sounders FC – SEA • Toronto FC – TOR Win • Loss • Tie • Home
Club	Match																													
Club	1	2	3	4	5	6	7	8	9	10	11	12	13	14	15	16	17	18	19	20	21	22	23	24	25	26	27	28	29	30
Chicago Fire	DAL	DC	NY	SJ	KC	CLB	SEA	NE	TOR	NY	CHV	DAL	HOU	DC	COL	CLB	SJ	SEA	RSL	HOU	KC	LA	COL	DC	RSL	CLB	TOR	LA	NE	CHV
Chicago Fire	3-1	1-1	0-1	3-3	2-2	2-2	1-1	1-1	2-0	1-0	3-2	3-0	1-0	1-2	2-1	0-0	0-2	0-0	0-1	2-3	2-0	2-0	2-3	1-0	1-1	2-2	2-2	0-1	0-0	0-1
Chivas USA	COL	DAL	CLB	LA	SEA	TOR	DAL	SJ	RSL	DC	KC	CHI	SEA	HOU	CLB	LA	NE	COL	NY	TOR	RSL	LA	NE	SEA	NY	DC	KC	SJ	CHI	HOU
Chivas USA	1-2	2-0	1-2	0-0	0-2	0-1	0-2	1-0	0-1	2-2	1-1	3-2	0-1	0-1	1-2	1-0	0-2	0-4	2-0	0-2	0-4	0-1	0-2	0-0	1-1	2-0	0-2	2-2	0-1	3-2
Colorado Rapids	CHV	KC	LA	CLB	HOU	LA	RSL	NE	SEA	NY	RSL	DC	DAL	SEA	CHI	DAL	DC	NY	CLB	CHV	CHI	HOU	TOR	TOR	SJ	SJ	KC	NE	DAL	RSL
Colorado Rapids	1-2	1-2	3-2	1-1	0-1	1-1	0-2	1-1	2-2	3-2	1-1	0-3	1-1	0-3	2-1	0-1	1-3	0-4	1-0	0-4	2-3	0-1	0-1	2-3	1-1	1-1	0-0	1-1	1-2	0-3
Columbus Crew	HOU	TOR	RSL	CHV	COL	CHI	TOR	KC	LA	SJ	SEA	KC	CHV	DAL	NY	DC	CHI	RSL	TOR	COL	SJ	DAL	NY	HOU	CHI	LA	SEA	NE	DC	NE
Columbus Crew	1-1	1-1	1-4	1-2	1-1	2-2	1-1	2-3	1-1	1-2	1-1	2-0	1-2	1-2	0-1	1-1	0-0	1-3	2-3	1-0	3-0	0-2	0-1	1-2	2-2	0-2	1-0	1-0	0-1	1-0
D.C. United	LA	CHI	HOU	RSL	NE	NY	DAL	KC	TOR	CHV	RSL	NE	NY	CHI	SEA	COL	CLB	COL	SJ	HOU	TOR	LA	CHI	DAL	KC	SEA	SJ	CHV	CLB	KC
D.C. United	2-2	1-1	0-1	1-2	1-1	3-2	1-2	1-1	3-3	2-2	0-0	1-2	0-2	1-2	3-3	0-3	1-1	1-3	2-2	3-4	0-2	0-0	1-0	2-2	0-1	2-1	2-1	2-0	0-1	2-2
FC Dallas	CHI	CHV	NE	TOR	TOR	CHV	DC	HOU	SEA	LA	CHI	SJ	HOU	CLB	COL	NY	COL	RSL	KC	HOU	CLB	NY	DC	LA	KC	RSL	NE	SJ	COL	SEA
FC Dallas	3-1	2-0	1-2	1-1	2-3	0-2	1-2	0-1	1-1	1-1	3-0	2-2	3-1	1-2	1-1	1-2	0-1	2-4	0-6	0-1	0-2	2-3	2-2	6-3	2-3	0-3	0-1	2-1	1-2	1-2
Houston Dynamo	CLB	SJ	DC	NY	COL	NE	DAL	NY	SJ	TOR	CHI	CHV	DAL	RSL	LA	KC	SEA	TOR	NE	DC	DAL	CHI	RSL	SEA	COL	CLB	RSL	KC	LA	CHV
Houston Dynamo	1-1	2-3	0-1	0-0	0-1	2-0	0-1	1-1	1-3	0-3	1-0	0-1	3-1	1-1	0-1	1-0	1-2	1-1	1-0	3-4	1-0	2-3	0-0	1-1	0-1	1-2	2-3	1-1	0-0	3-2
Kansas City Wizards	TOR	COL	SJ	SEA	CHI	NY	TOR	DC	CLB	RSL	CHV	LA	CLB	NE	HOU	NE	LA	DAL	CHI	SJ	RSL	NE	DC	NY	DAL	COL	HOU	CHV	SEA	DC
Kansas City Wizards	3-2	1-2	0-2	1-0	2-2	0-1	0-1	1-1	2-3	2-0	1-1	1-1	2-0	1-3	1-0	0-0	1-1	0-6	2-0	0-1	1-0	4-2	0-1	1-0	2-3	0-0	1-1	0-2	3-2	2-2
Los Angeles Galaxy	DC	COL	CHV	SJ	COL	NY	RSL	SEA	CLB	DAL	KC	TOR	RSL	SJ	HOU	NE	CHV	NY	KC	NE	SEA	CHI	DC	CHV	DAL	TOR	CLB	CHI	HOU	SJ
Los Angeles Galaxy	2-2	3-2	0-0	1-1	1-1	0-1	2-2	1-1	1-1	1-1	1-1	2-1	2-0	1-2	0-1	0-1	1-0	3-1	1-1	2-1	2-0	2-0	0-0	0-1	6-3	0-2	0-2	0-1	0-0	0-2
New England Revolution	SJ	NY	DAL	DC	RSL	HOU	CHI	COL	TOR	DC	NY	KC	LA	KC	CHV	HOU	TOR	LA	SEA	RSL	SJ	KC	CHV	NY	SEA	DAL	COL	CLB	CHI	CLB
New England Revolution	1-0	1-1	1-2	1-1	0-6	2-0	1-1	1-1	1-3	1-2	0-4	1-3	0-1	0-0	0-2	1-0	1-1	2-1	1-0	1-3	1-2	4-2	0-2	1-1	1-2	0-1	1-1	1-0	0-0	1-0
New York Red Bulls	SEA	NE	CHI	HOU	RSL	KC	DC	LA	SJ	HOU	CHI	COL	DC	NE	TOR	SEA	TOR	CLB	DAL	LA	COL	CHV	DAL	CLB	KC	NE	CHV	SJ	RSL	TOR
New York Red Bulls	0-3	1-1	0-1	0-0	0-2	0-1	3-2	0-1	1-4	1-1	1-0	3-2	0-2	0-4	1-3	1-1	0-2	0-1	1-2	3-1	0-4	2-0	2-3	0-1	1-0	1-1	1-1	0-1	0-2	0-5
Real Salt Lake	SEA	CLB	DC	NY	NE	COL	LA	CHV	KC	DC	SJ	COL	LA	HOU	TOR	SJ	CLB	DAL	CHI	SEA	HOU	NE	CHV	KC	CHI	HOU	DAL	NY	TOR	COL
Real Salt Lake	0-2	1-4	1-2	0-2	0-6	0-2	2-2	0-1	2-0	0-0	1-2	1-1	2-0	1-1	0-3	1-1	1-3	2-4	0-1	0-1	0-0	1-3	0-4	1-0	1-1	2-3	0-3	0-2	0-1	0-3
San Jose Earthquakes	NE	HOU	KC	CHI	LA	SEA	CHV	NY	HOU	CLB	RSL	DAL	SEA	LA	RSL	TOR	CHI	DC	SEA	CLB	KC	NE	COL	COL	DC	NY	DAL	TOR	CHV	LA
San Jose Earthquakes	1-0	2-3	0-2	3-3	1-1	0-2	1-0	1-4	1-3	1-2	1-2	2-2	1-2	1-2	1-1	3-1	0-2	2-2	0-4	3-0	0-1	1-2	1-1	1-1	2-1	0-1	2-1	1-1	2-2	0-2
Seattle Sounders FC	NY	RSL	TOR	KC	CHV	SJ	CHI	LA	DAL	COL	CLB	CHV	SJ	DC	NY	COL	HOU	CHI	SJ	RSL	LA	NE	HOU	TOR	DC	CHV	NE	CLB	KC	DAL
Seattle Sounders FC	0-3	0-2	2-0	1-0	0-2	0-2	1-1	1-1	1-1	2-2	1-1	0-1	1-2	3-3	1-1	0-3	1-2	0-0	0-4	0-1	2-0	1-0	1-1	0-0	2-1	0-0	1-2	1-0	3-2	1-2
Toronto FC	KC	CLB	SEA	DAL	DAL	CHV	KC	CLB	DC	CHI	NE	HOU	LA	NY	NY	RSL	SJ	HOU	CLB	NE	DC	CHV	SEA	COL	COL	LA	CHI	SJ	RSL	NY
Toronto FC	3-2	1-1	2-0	1-1	2-3	0-1	0-1	1-1	3-3	2-0	1-3	0-3	2-1	1-2	0-2	0-3	3-1	1-1	2-3	1-1	0-2	0-2	0-0	0-1	2-3	0-2	2-2	1-1	0-1	0-5

== Standings ==
=== Eastern Conference ===
Pos	Team	Pld	W	L	T	GF	GA	GD	Pts	Qualification
1	Columbus Crew	30	13	7	10	41	31	+10	49	MLS Cup Playoffs
2	Chicago Fire	30	11	7	12	39	34	+5	45	MLS Cup Playoffs
3	New England Revolution	30	11	10	9	33	37	−4	42	MLS Cup Playoffs
4	D.C. United	30	9	8	13	43	44	−1	40	
5	Toronto FC	30	10	11	9	37	46	−9	39	
6	Kansas City Wizards	30	8	13	9	33	42	−9	33	
7	New York Red Bulls	30	5	19	6	27	47	−20	21	

Source: MLS

=== Western Conference ===
Pos	Team	Pld	W	L	T	GF	GA	GD	Pts	Qualification
1	LA Galaxy	30	12	6	12	36	31	+5	48	MLS Cup Playoffs
2	Houston Dynamo	30	13	8	9	39	29	+10	48	MLS Cup Playoffs
3	Seattle Sounders FC	30	12	7	11	38	29	+9	47	MLS Cup Playoffs
4	Chivas USA	30	13	11	6	34	31	+3	45	MLS Cup Playoffs
5	Real Salt Lake	30	11	12	7	43	35	+8	40	MLS Cup Playoffs
6	Colorado Rapids	30	10	10	10	42	38	+4	40	
7	FC Dallas	30	11	13	6	50	47	+3	39	
8	San Jose Earthquakes	30	7	14	9	36	50	−14	30	

Source: MLS

=== Overall standings ===
Pos	Team	Pld	W	L	T	GF	GA	GD	Pts	Qualification
1	Columbus Crew (S)	30	13	7	10	41	31	+10	49	CONCACAF Champions League
2	LA Galaxy	30	12	6	12	36	31	+5	48	CONCACAF Champions League
3	Houston Dynamo	30	13	8	9	39	29	+10	48	North American SuperLiga
4	Seattle Sounders FC	30	12	7	11	38	29	+9	47	CONCACAF Champions League
5	Chicago Fire	30	11	7	12	39	34	+5	45	North American SuperLiga
6	Chivas USA	30	13	11	6	34	31	+3	45	North American SuperLiga
7	New England Revolution	30	11	10	9	33	37	−4	42	North American SuperLiga
8	Real Salt Lake (C)	30	11	12	7	43	35	+8	40	CONCACAF Champions League
9	Colorado Rapids	30	10	10	10	42	38	+4	40	
10	D.C. United	30	9	8	13	43	44	−1	40	
11	FC Dallas	30	11	13	6	50	47	+3	39	
12	Toronto FC	30	10	11	9	37	46	−9	39	CONCACAF Champions League
13	Kansas City Wizards	30	8	13	9	33	42	−9	33	
14	San Jose Earthquakes	30	7	14	9	36	50	−14	30	
15	New York Red Bulls	30	5	19	6	27	47	−20	21	

Source: MLS
Rules for classification: 1) points; 2) head-to-head record; 3) goal difference; 4) number of goals scored
(C) Champions; (S) Supporters' Shield

== MLS Cup playoffs ==
=== Bracket ===
Conference semifinals
E1	Columbus Crew	0	2
E4	Real Salt Lake	1	3
Eastern Conference
E3	New England Revolution	2	0
E2	Chicago Fire	1	2
W1	Los Angeles Galaxy	2	1
W4	Chivas USA	2	0
Western Conference
W3	Seattle Sounders FC	0	0
W2	Houston Dynamo (a.e.t.)	0	1

Conference finals
E4	Real Salt Lake (p)	0 (5)
E2	Chicago Fire	0 (4)
W1	Los Angeles Galaxy (a.e.t.)	2
W2	Houston Dynamo	0

MLS Cup
E4	Real Salt Lake (p)	1 (5)
W1	Los Angeles Galaxy	1 (4)

== Player statistics ==
=== Goals ===
Rank	Player	Club	Goals
1	(United States) Jeff Cunningham	FC Dallas	17
2	(United States) Conor Casey	Colorado Rapids	16
3	(Argentina) Guillermo Barros Schelotto	Columbus Crew	12
3	(United States) Landon Donovan	LA Galaxy	12
3	(United States) Robbie Findley	Real Salt Lake	12
3	(Colombia) Fredy Montero	Seattle Sounders FC	12
3	(Colombia) Juan Pablo Ángel	New York Red Bulls	12
8	(Canada) Dwayne De Rosario	Toronto FC	11
8	(Jamaica) Ryan Johnson	San Jose Earthquakes	11
8	(United States) Josh Wolff	Kansas City Wizards	11

=== Assists ===
Rank	Player	Club	Assists
1	(Jamaica) Omar Cummings	Colorado Rapids	11
2	(Netherlands) Dave van den Bergh	FC Dallas	10
3	(United States) Brad Davis	Houston Dynamo	9
4	(Mexico) Cuauhtémoc Blanco	Chicago Fire	8
5	(United States) Landon Donovan	LA Galaxy	6
5	(United States) Nate Jaqua	Seattle Sounders FC	6
5	(Grenada) Shalrie Joseph	New England Revolution	6
5	(Argentina) Claudio López	Kansas City Wizards	6
5	(Argentina) Javier Morales	Real Salt Lake	6
10	10 players		5

=== Clean sheets ===
Rank	Player	Club	Clean sheets
1	(United States) Zach Thornton	Chivas USA	12
2	(United States) Jon Busch	Chicago Fire	10
2	(United States) Kasey Keller	Seattle Sounders FC	10
2	(Canada) Pat Onstad	Houston Dynamo	10
5	(Jamaica) Donovan Ricketts	LA Galaxy	9
5	(United States) Nick Rimando	Real Salt Lake	9
7	(United States) Matt Reis	New England Revolution	8
8	(United States) Kevin Hartman	Kansas City Wizards	7
8	(United States) Will Hesmer	Columbus Crew	7
8	(United States) Matt Pickens	Colorado Rapids	7

== Awards ==
=== Individual awards ===
Award	Player	Club
Most Valuable Player	(United States) Landon Donovan	LA Galaxy
Defender of the Year	(United States) Chad Marshall	Columbus Crew
Goalkeeper of the Year	(United States) Zach Thornton	Chivas USA
Coach of the Year	(United States) Bruce Arena	LA Galaxy
Rookie of the Year	(United States) Omar Gonzalez	LA Galaxy
Newcomer of the Year	(Colombia) Fredy Montero	Seattle Sounders FC
Comeback Player of the Year	(United States) Zach Thornton	Chivas USA
Golden Boot	(United States) Jeff Cunningham	FC Dallas
Goal of the Year	(United States) Landon Donovan	LA Galaxy
Save of the Year	(Canada) Pat Onstad	Houston Dynamo
Fair Play Award	(United States) Steve Ralston	New England Revolution
Humanitarian of the Year	(United States) Jimmy Conrad (United States) Logan Pause	Kansas City Wizards; Chicago Fire

=== Best XI ===
Goalkeeper	Defenders	Midfielders	Forwards
(United States) Zach Thornton, Chivas USA	(United States) Geoff Cameron, Houston (Colombia) Wilman Conde, Chicago (United States) Chad Marshall, Columbus	(Canada) Dwayne De Rosario, Toronto (United States) Landon Donovan, LA Galaxy (United States) Stuart Holden, Houston (Grenada) Shalrie Joseph, New England (Sweden) Freddie Ljungberg, Seattle	(United States) Conor Casey, Colorado (United States) Jeff Cunningham, Dallas

=== Player of the Month ===
Month	Player	Club
March	(Colombia) Fredy Montero	Seattle Sounders FC
April	(United States) Brian McBride	Chicago Fire
May	(United States) Conor Casey	Colorado Rapids
June	(Argentina) Guillermo Barros Schelotto	Columbus Crew
July	(United States) Landon Donovan	LA Galaxy
August	(United States) Chad Marshall	Columbus Crew
September	(United States) Jeff Cunningham	FC Dallas
October	(Sweden) Freddie Ljungberg	Seattle Sounders FC

=== Weekly awards ===
Player of the Week
Week	Player	Club
Week 1	(Colombia) Fredy Montero	Seattle Sounders FC
Week 2	(United States) Kasey Keller	Seattle Sounders FC
Week 3	(United States) Conor Casey	Colorado Rapids
Week 4	(Jamaica) Donovan Ricketts	LA Galaxy
Week 5	(United States) Josh Wolff	Kansas City Wizards
Week 6	(Argentina) Javier Morales	Real Salt Lake
Week 7	(Bolivia) Jaime Moreno	D.C. United
Week 8	(Senegal) Macoumba Kandji	New York Red Bulls
Week 9	(United States) Josh Wolff	Kansas City Wizards
Week 10	(Honduras) Amado Guevara	Toronto FC
Week 11	(United States) Conor Casey	Colorado Rapids
Week 12	(United States) Taylor Twellman	New England Revolution
Week 13	(Argentina) Guillermo Barros Schelotto	Columbus Crew
Week 14	(Jamaica) Omar Cummings	Colorado Rapids
Week 15	(United States) Nate Jaqua	Seattle Sounders FC
Week 16	(United States) Jeff Cunningham	FC Dallas
Week 17	(United States) Chad Barrett	Toronto FC
Week 18	(Mexico) Cuauhtémoc Blanco	Chicago Fire
Week 19	(Armenia) Yura Movsisyan	Real Salt Lake
Week 20	(United States) Jeff Cunningham	FC Dallas
Week 21	(United States) Conor Casey	Colorado Rapids
Week 22	(United States) Chad Marshall	Columbus Crew
Week 23	(Zimbabwe) Kheli Dube	New England Revolution
Week 24	(Brazil) Pablo Campos	Real Salt Lake
Week 25	(United States) Josh Wolff	Kansas City Wizards
Week 26	(United States) Jeff Cunningham	FC Dallas
Week 27	(United States) Brad Davis	Houston Dynamo
Week 28	(Grenada) Shalrie Joseph	New England Revolution
Week 29	(United States) Landon Donovan	LA Galaxy
Week 30	(United States) Jeff Cunningham	FC Dallas
Week 31	(Sweden) Freddie Ljungberg	Seattle Sounders FC
Week 32	(United States) Robbie Findley	Real Salt Lake

Goal of the Week
Week	Player	Club
Week 1	(Colombia) Fredy Montero	Seattle Sounders FC
Week 2	(Colombia) Fredy Montero	Seattle Sounders FC
Week 3	(The Gambia) Sainey Nyassi	New England Revolution
Week 4	(United States) Brian McBride	Chicago Fire
Week 5	(United States) Brian Ching	Houston Dynamo
Week 6	(United States) Clint Mathis	Real Salt Lake
Week 7	(Bolivia) Jaime Moreno	D.C. United
Week 8	(United States) Chris Pontius	D.C. United
Week 9	(United States) Santino Quaranta	D.C. United
Week 10	(Argentina) Claudio López	Kansas City Wizards
Week 11	(United States) Nate Jaqua	Seattle Sounders FC
Week 12	(Jamaica) Omar Cummings	Colorado Rapids
Week 13	(United States) Davy Arnaud	Kansas City Wizards
Week 14	(United States) Eric Avila	FC Dallas
Week 15	(United States) Nate Jaqua	Seattle Sounders FC
Week 16	(Guatemala) Marco Pappa	Chicago Fire
Week 17	(United States) Patrick Ianni	Seattle Sounders FC
Week 18	(United States) Bryan Namoff	D.C. United
Week 19	(Argentina) Claudio López	Kansas City Wizards
Week 20	(Brazil) Fred	D.C. United
Week 21	(United States) Landon Donovan	LA Galaxy
Week 22	(Democratic Republic of the Congo) Steve Zakuani	Seattle Sounders FC
Week 23	(United States) Nate Jaqua	Seattle Sounders FC
Week 24	(United States) Wells Thompson	New England Revolution
Week 25	(Lithuania) Edgaras Jankauskas	New England Revolution
Week 26	(Jamaica) O'Brian White	Toronto FC
Week 27	(United States) Brad Davis	Houston Dynamo
Week 28	(United States) Jeff Cunningham	FC Dallas
Week 29	(United States) Jeff Cunningham	FC Dallas
Week 30	(United States) Jeff Cunningham	FC Dallas
Week 31	(United States) George John	FC Dallas
Week 32	(United States) Robbie Findley	Real Salt Lake

Save of the week was first introduced during week 10 of the 2009 season.

Save of the Week
Week	Goalkeeper	Club
Week 10	(United States) Kasey Keller	Seattle Sounders FC
Week 11	(United States) Kevin Hartman	Kansas City Wizards
Week 12	(Canada) Pat Onstad	Houston Dynamo
Week 13	(United States) Danny Cepero	New York Red Bulls
Week 14	(Jamaica) Donovan Ricketts	Los Angeles Galaxy
Week 15	(Switzerland) Stefan Frei	Toronto FC
Week 16	(Puerto Rico) Josh Saunders	Los Angeles Galaxy
Week 17	(Canada) Pat Onstad	Houston Dynamo
Week 18	(Jamaica) Donovan Ricketts	Los Angeles Galaxy
Week 19	(United States) Nick Rimando	Real Salt Lake
Week 20	(Argentina) Darío Sala	FC Dallas
Week 21	(United States) Kasey Keller	Seattle Sounders FC
Week 22	(Honduras) Amado Guevara	Toronto FC
Week 23	(Canada) Onstad & (United States) Barret	Houston Dynamo
Week 24	(Switzerland) Stefan Frei	Toronto FC
Week 25	(Switzerland) Stefan Frei	Toronto FC
Week 26	(Switzerland) Stefan Frei	Toronto FC
Week 27	(United States) Zach Thornton	Chivas USA
Week 28	(Argentina) Darío Sala	FC Dallas
Week 29	(Jamaica) Tyrone Marshall	Seattle Sounders FC
Week 30	(Argentina) Dario Sala	FC Dallas
Week 31	(United States) Geoff Cameron	Houston Dynamo
Week 32	(United States) Kevin Hartman	Kansas City Wizards

== Attendance ==
Club	Games	Season	Game Avg.
Seattle Sounders FC	15	499,262	30,897
Los Angeles Galaxy	15	333,239	20,827
Toronto FC	15	305,167	20,344
Real Salt Lake	15	303,138	17,831
Houston Dynamo	15	264,368	17,624
Chivas USA	15	251,611	15,725
D.C. United	15	202,605	15,585
Chicago Fire	15	247,908	15,487
Columbus Crew	15	226,808	14,175
Colorado Rapids	15	195,282	13,018
New York Red Bulls	15	165,672	12,744
New England Revolution	15	173,985	12,427
San Jose Earthquakes	15	134,283	10,329
Kansas City Wizards	15	150,802	10,053
FC Dallas	15	108,717	9,883
Totals	225	3,562,847	16,120

== See also ==
- List of transfers for the 2009 Major League Soccer season
- 2008 MLS Expansion Draft
