= Ange N'Silu =

Congolese footballer

Personal information
- Full name: Mawete Ange N'Silu
- Date of birth: 17 February 1986 (age 40)
- Place of birth: Kinshasa, Zaire
- Height: 1.83 m (6 ft 0 in)
- Position: Forward

Youth career
- 2001–2004: Le Havre

Senior career*
Years	Team	Apps	(Gls)
2004–2007	Le Havre	0	(0)
2008	Le Mont	31	(25)
2009	D.C. United	9	(1)
2010–2015	Le Mont	95	(62)
2015	Yverdon-Sport	20	(6)
2016	FC Azzurri 90 LS	9	(6)
2016–2017	FC Vevey-Sports 05	13	(4)
2017	FC Meyrin	20	(6)
2017–2019	Lancy FC	43	(20)
2019–2022	CS Chênois	29	(5)
2022–2023	FC Grand-Saconnex		
- * Club domestic league appearances and goals

Ange N'Silu (born 17 February 1986) is a Congolese former professional footballer who played as a forward.

== Career ==
=== Europe ===
N'Silu was born in Zaire (now the Democratic Republic of the Congo), but was raised in Paris, France. He signed with Le Havre of the French Ligue 1 at the age of 15, and spent time with the club's academy and reserve squad, but did not play with the first team.

In 2008, N'Silu signed with Lausanne-based Swiss side FC Le Mont of the 1.Liga, and played in 31 games, scoring 25 goals.

=== North America ===
N'Silu signed for D.C. United on 24 February 2009, after impressing United's general manager, Dave Kasper, during a pre-season trial. He made his United debut against Houston Dynamo on 4 April 2009. N'Silu was released by D.C. United in January 2010.
