= Dejan Jakovic =

Canadian soccer player (born 1985)

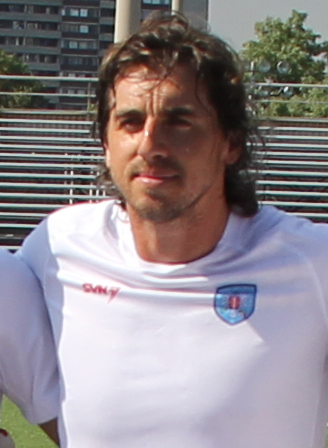
- Jakovic with Serbian White Eagles in 2022

Personal information
- Date of birth: 16 July 1985 (age 41)
- Place of birth: Karlovac, SR Croatia, SFR Yugoslavia
- Height: 1.88 m (6 ft 2 in)
- Position: Centre-back

Team information
- Current team: Serbian White Eagles
- Number: 4

Youth career
- Kingsview
- Rexdale SC

College career
Years	Team	Apps	(Gls)
2004–2007	UAB Blazers	50	(8)

Senior career*
Years	Team	Apps	(Gls)
2007	Canadian Lions		
2008–2009	Red Star Belgrade	3	(0)
2009–2013	D.C. United	98	(1)
2014–2016	Shimizu S-Pulse	42	(0)
2017	New York Cosmos	22	(1)
2018–2020	Los Angeles FC	34	(1)
2019	→ Las Vegas Lights (loan)	4	(0)
2021	Forge FC	5	(0)
2022–	Serbian White Eagles		

International career^{‡}
2008	Canada U23	5	(0)
2008–2018	Canada	41	(1)

Managerial career
- 2023: Toronto FC (assistant)
- * Club domestic league appearances and goals as of 17:59, 18 August 2021 (UTC) ‡ National team caps and goals as of 24 March 2018

Dejan Jakovic (Serbian Cyrillic: Дејан Јаковић, pronounced [dějan jâkoʋitɕ]; born 16 July 1985) is a Canadian soccer player who plays as a centre-back for the Serbian White Eagles. Internationally, he represented the Canada national team from 2008 to 2018.

== Early life and career ==
Born in Karlovac, SR Croatia prior to the breakup of Yugoslavia, Jakovic was brought by his parents to Canada at the age of six following the outbreak of war in 1991. They settled in Etobicoke, part of Metropolitan Toronto. His father Nenad played for NK Karlovac in Croatia.

Jakovic took up soccer in Canada. He was a four-year letterwinner at Scarlett Heights Academy, and was named team MVP as a junior and senior, captaining both indoor and outdoor teams. He played in the Canada national youth program, and also for two-time Ontario Cup winner Woodbridge Strikers under Bob Graham. He was a member of the team that competed at the 2004 Dallas Cup, played with former UAB teammate Lukasz Kwapisz.

At the age of eighteen, Jakovic had a trial with OFK Beograd, but was not signed by the team.

=== College ===
After training with OFK U18 team, Jakovic accepted a scholarship to the University of Alabama at Birmingham and went on to play four years of college soccer for the Blazers.

In 2007, he played with the Canadian Lions of the Canadian Soccer League where he was selected for the Locust CSL All Star game.

== Club career ==
=== Red Star Belgrade ===
On 28 June 2008, soon to be twenty-three-year-old Jakovic joined Red Star Belgrade ahead of the 2008–09 season, after successfully completing a tryout with the team. He officially signed with the club on 30 June 2008.

Jakovic made three league starts at the beginning of the season under head coach Zdeněk Zeman. However, following a coaching change on 6 September 2008, Dejan lost his spot in the team and failed to register a single league appearance following the appointment of new head coach Čedomir Janevski.

At the 2008-09 winter break, Red Star began looking at options to move Jakovic. In December 2008 it was reported he would be sent to FK Rad along with Marko Blažić, another player who started under Zeman but had played sparsely since Janevski took over, as part of a deal to bring defender Nemanja Pejčinović to Red Star. However, by February 2009, no trade had been announced by the teams, and Jakovic was still on the list Red Star players that started preparations for second half of the season.

=== D.C. United ===
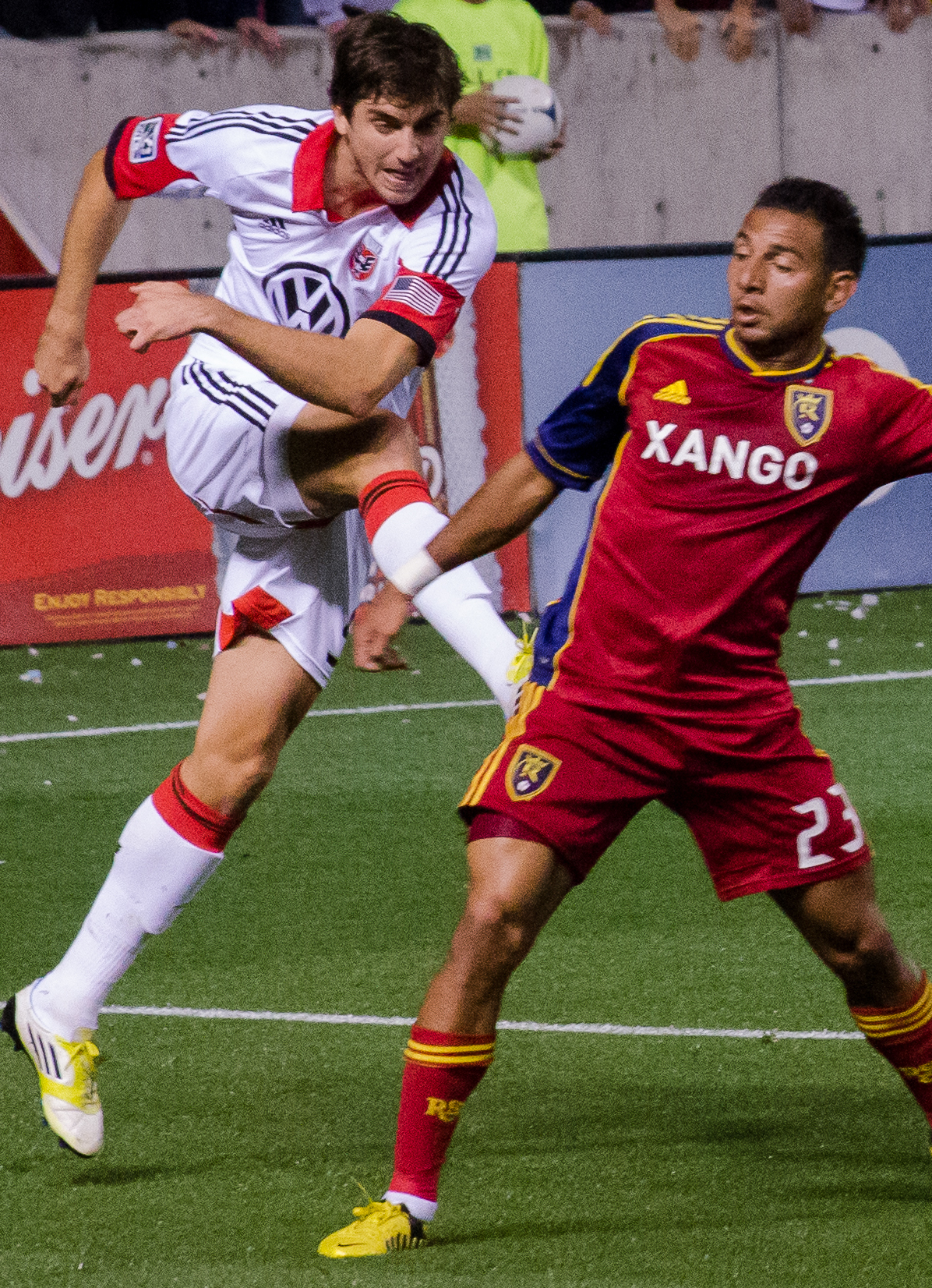
Jakovic in 2012

Jakovic signed for Major League Soccer side D.C. United on 27 February 2009. Jakovic scored his first goal for the club on 26 May 2012 against New England Revolution, the game ended in a 3–2 home victory. Jakovic signed a contract extension with D.C. United following the 2012 season.

=== Shimizu S-Pulse ===
Jakovic signed with Japanese club Shimizu S-Pulse on 14 January 2014. Jakovic was released by Shimizu S-Pulse on 5 February 2017.

=== New York Cosmos ===
In March 2017, Jakovic signed with North American Soccer League club New York Cosmos.

=== Los Angeles FC ===
Jakovic returned to the top flight when he signed with MLS expansion club Los Angeles FC in January 2018. Jakovic would make his LAFC debut against Seattle Sounders FC during the 2018 season opener. He re-signed with Los Angeles in January 2019 ahead of the 2019 MLS season.

He moved on loan to Las Vegas Lights on 7 June 2019. He was recalled three weeks later on the 28th. Jakovic's option for the 2020 season was declined by Los Angeles, but he signed a new contract with the club in December 2019.

=== Forge FC ===
On 13 May 2021, Jakovic signed with defending Canadian Premier League champions Forge FC. He was limited to appearing in only five matches due to injury and left the club after one season.

=== Serbian White Eagles ===
Jakovic returned to the Canadian Soccer League for the 2022 season to sign with the Serbian White Eagles. He made his debut on June 26, 2022, against the Toronto Falcons. He helped the Serbs in securing the regular-season title including a playoff berth. In the second round of the postseason Jakovic served as the team captain where the Serbs were eliminated from the competition after a defeat to FC Continentals.

== International career ==
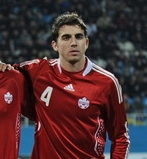
Jakovic with Canada in 2010.

Jakovic made his debut for the senior Canadian men's soccer team on 30 January 2008 against Martinique. Later in 2008, he earned five caps for the Canada U-23 squad in the 2008 CONCACAF Men's Pre-Olympic Tournament, during which Canada finished third, one place out of qualification. Jakovic was also chosen in the 23-man roster for the 2009 CONCACAF Gold Cup; Canada won Group A with 7 points before being knocked out by Honduras in the quarter-finals.

Jakovic was selected for the 2011 CONCACAF Gold Cup, however sustained a hamstring injury a week prior to the group stage in a friendly at BMO Field against Ecuador the match ended 2–2. David Edgar was selected on 6 June to replace Jakovic in the 23-man squad for the CONCACAF tournament.

== Managerial career ==
In 2023, he became involved with Toronto FC and became an assistant coach for the club's academy program. Currently, Jakovic is the U-16 Academy Head Coach.

== Career statistics ==
=== Club ===
As of match played on 8 November 2020

Appearances and goals by club, season and competition
Club	Season	League			Cup		League Cup		Continental		Other		Total	
Club	Season	Division	Apps	Goals	Apps	Goals	Apps	Goals	Apps	Goals	Apps	Goals	Apps	Goals
Red Star Belgrade	2008–09	Serbian Superliga	3	0	0	0	—		2 (Note: Appearances in the UEFA Europa League.)	0	—		5	0
D.C. United	2009	MLS	23	0	0	0	—		2 (Note: Appearances in the CONCACAF Champions League.)	0	—		25	0
D.C. United	2010	MLS	19	0	2	0	—		—		—		21	0
D.C. United	2011	MLS	15	0	0	0	—		—		—		15	0
D.C. United	2012	MLS	23	1	0	0	—		—		4 (Note: Appearance(s) in the MLS Cup playoffs.)	0	27	1
D.C. United	2013	MLS	18	0	2	0	—		—		—		30	0
D.C. United	Total		98	1	4	0	—		2	0	4	0	108	1
Shimizu S-Pulse	2014	J1 League	25	0	2	0	5	0	—		—		32	0
Shimizu S-Pulse	2015	J1 League	16	0	0	0	1	0	—		—		17	0
Shimizu S-Pulse	2016	J2 League	1	0	0	0	0	0	—		—		1	0
Shimizu S-Pulse	Total		42	0	2	0	6	0	—		—		50	0
New York Cosmos	2017	NASL	22	1	1	0	—		—		2 (Note: Appearances in the North American Soccer League playoffs.)	0	25	0
Los Angeles FC	2018	MLS	15	0	3	0	—		—		0	0	18	0
Los Angeles FC	2019	MLS	3	0	0	0	—		—		1	0	4	0
Los Angeles FC	2020	MLS	16	1	0	0	—		2	0	2 (Note: Knockout Round of the MLS is Back Tournament)	0	20	1
Los Angeles FC	Total		34	1	3	0	0	0	2	0	2	0	41	1
Las Vegas Lights (loan)	2019	USL Championship	4	0	0	0	—		—		—		4	0
Forge FC	2021	Canadian Premier League	5	0	0	0	—		0	0	—		5	0
Career total			208	2	10	0	6	0	6	0	9	0	239	2

=== International ===
Appearances and goals by national team and year
National team	Year	Apps	Goals
Canada	2008	1	0
Canada	2009	5	0
Canada	2010	3	0
Canada	2011	2	0
Canada	2012	1	0
Canada	2013	5	0
Canada	2014	1	0
Canada	2015	9	0
Canada	2016	6	0
Canada	2017	7	1
Canada	2018	1	0
Total		41	1

Scores and results list Canada's goal tally first, score column indicates score after each Jakovic goal.

List of international goals scored by Dejan Jakovic
No.	Date	Venue	Opponent	Score	Result	Competition
1	7 July 2017	Red Bull Arena, Harrison, United States	French Guiana	1–0	4–2	2017 CONCACAF Gold Cup

== Honours ==
D.C. United

- Lamar Hunt U.S. Open Cup: 2013

Serbian White Eagles

- Canadian Soccer League Regular Season: 2022
