= Devon McTavish =

American soccer player

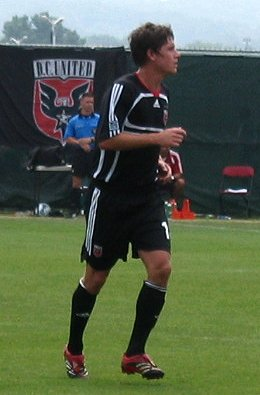

Personal information
- Date of birth: August 8, 1984 (age 42)
- Place of birth: Winchester, Virginia, United States
- Height: 5 ft 9 in (1.75 m)
- Position: Defender

College career
Years	Team	Apps	(Gls)
2002–2005	West Virginia Mountaineers	75	(13)

Senior career*
Years	Team	Apps	(Gls)
2004	Boulder Rapids Reserve	7	(1)
2006–2011	D.C. United	83	(1)
Total		90	(2)
- * Club domestic league appearances and goals as of June 19, 2011

Devon McTavish (born August 8, 1984, in Winchester, Virginia) is an American former professional soccer player. He played his entire professional career from 2006 to 2011 for D.C. United in Major League Soccer.

== Career ==
=== Youth and college ===
McTavish attended James Wood High School and played club soccer for the Chantilly-based FC Cannons under coach Mike Volpe.

McTavish played college soccer for West Virginia University from 2002 to 2005. He is ranked third all-time in school history with 75 appearances for the Mountaineers. He scored 13 goals for West Virginia, including five game-winners. In 2004, he spent the collegiate off season with the Boulder Rapids Reserve of the Premier Development League.

=== Professional ===
McTavish was selected in the fourth round 43rd overall in the 2006 MLS Supplemental Draft by D.C. United. He made his first appearance for D.C. United against the Chicago Fire in a 1–0 win. He earned his first start in the next game against Kansas City. During the 2007 MLS season, McTavish made his way into the starting lineup of D.C. United and constantly pressured central defenders Bobby Boswell and Greg Vanney for time. He scored his first goal on March 12, 2008, in a CONCACAF Champions' Cup game against Jamaican side Harbour View.

McTavish stayed with D.C. through the 2011 season. At season's end, the club declined his 2012 contract option and he entered the 2011 MLS Re-Entry Draft. McTavish was not selected in the draft and became a free agent. He announced his retirement on December 22, 2011.

== Post-professional career ==
Devon McTavish makes up one third of the hosting crew on the Fans of United podcast that covers D.C. United in its weekly episodes.

Also in 2016, McTavish joined with Dave Johnson on color commentary for D.C. United matches on NBC Sports Washington.

== Honors ==
=== James Wood Colonels ===
- Hall of Fame 2016

=== D.C. United ===
- Major League Soccer Supporter's Shield (2): 2006, 2007
- Lamar Hunt U.S. Open Cup (1): 2008

== See also ==
- D.C. United
