= Bryan Namoff =

American soccer player

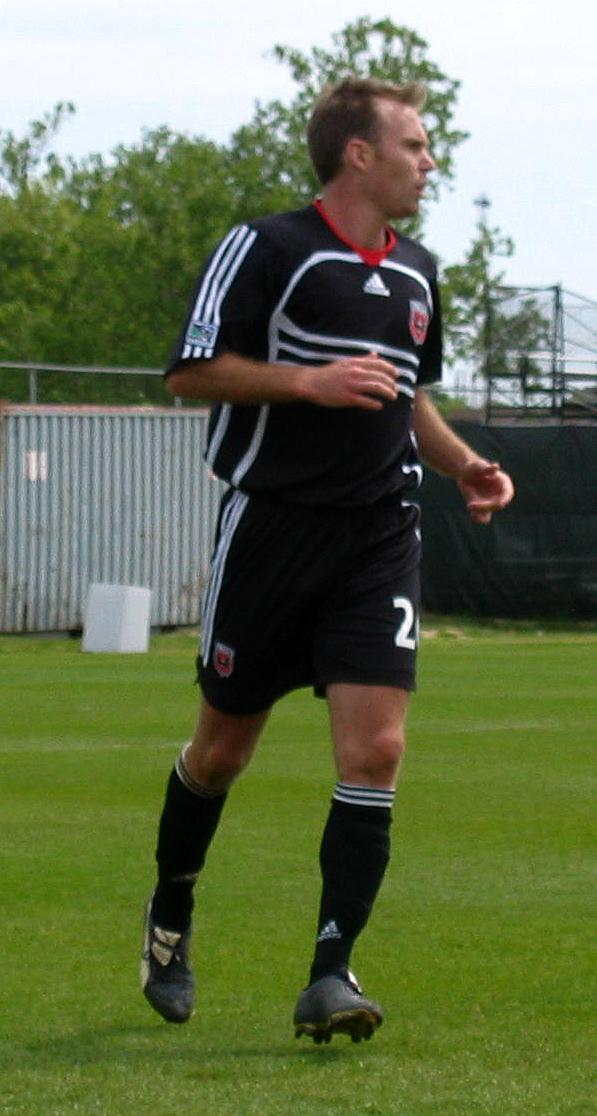

Personal information
- Date of birth: May 28, 1979 (age 47)
- Place of birth: Carson City, Nevada, United States
- Height: 5 ft 10 in (1.78 m)
- Positions: Defender; midfielder

Youth career
- 1997–2000: Bradley Braves

Senior career*
Years	Team	Apps	(Gls)
2000	Rockford Raptors		
2001–2010	D.C. United	195	(4)
2002–2003	→ Richmond Kickers (loan)	14	(0)

International career
2007	United States	1	(0)
- * Club domestic league appearances and goals

Bryan Namoff (born May 28, 1979) is an American former soccer player who played primarily as a defender. He spent 10 years in Major League Soccer with D.C. United and made 195 regular-season appearances for the club.

== Early life and college ==
Namoff was from Rockford, Illinois, and attended Boylan High School. He played for the Bradley Braves from 1997 through 2000, making 80 appearances and recording 32 goals and 17 assists. He was a four-time All-Missouri Valley Conference selection and a 2000 All-American.

== Professional career ==
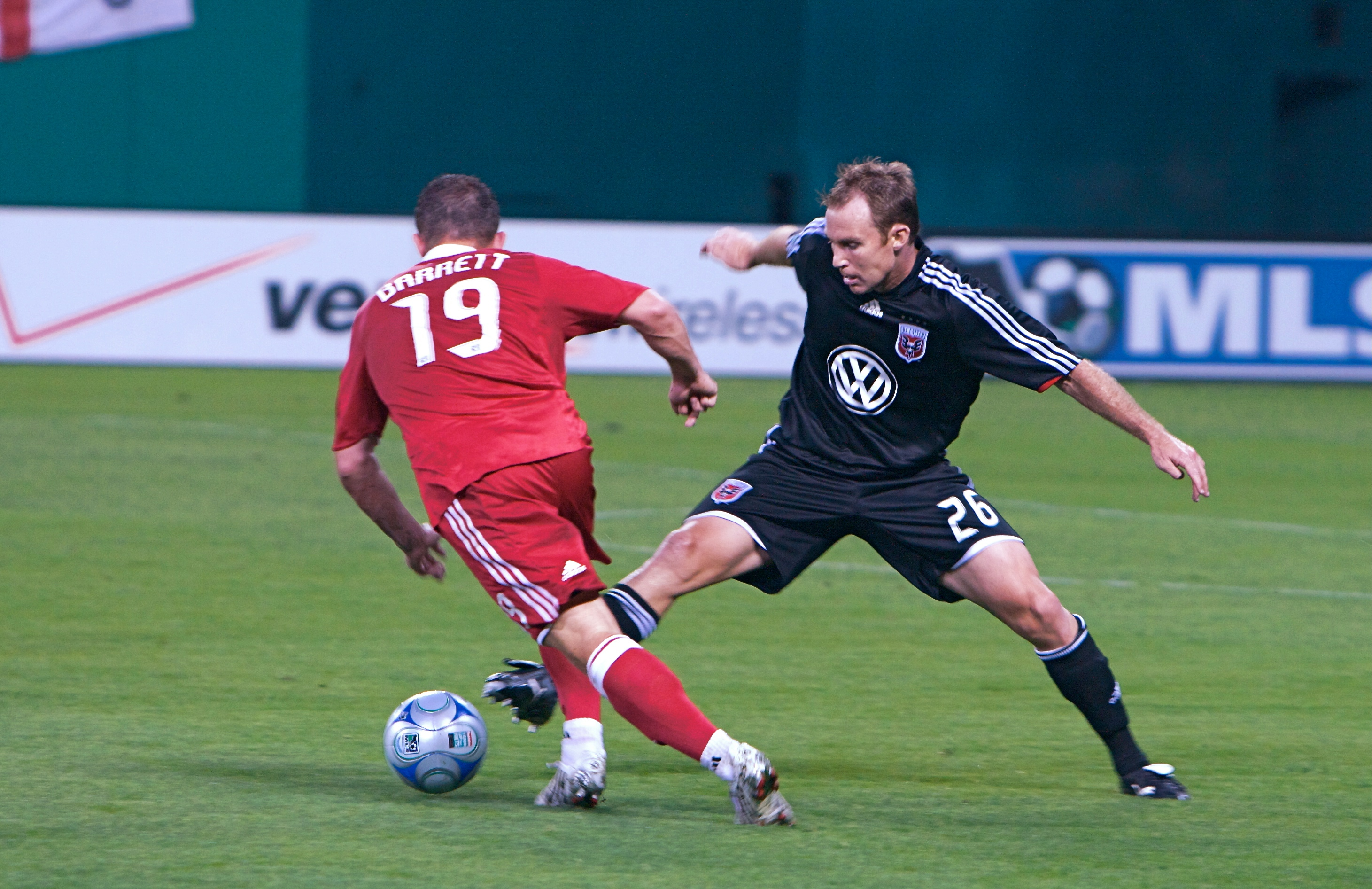
Namoff challenging Chad Barrett in a 2008 regular season match at RFK Stadium

D.C. United selected Namoff with the 15th overall pick in the 2001 MLS SuperDraft. He played 15 matches and provided seven assists in his rookie season. Namoff, who had played as an attacking central midfielder at Bradley, later became a right back for United. In 2002, he was loaned to the Richmond Kickers in August and returned to D.C. United for the final two weeks of the season.

Namoff made 195 regular-season appearances for D.C. United, placing him third on the club's all-time list at the time of his departure. After sustaining a concussion in September 2009 and experiencing continuing symptoms, he suspended his playing career in July 2010 and joined D.C. United's technical staff, assisting with scouting and youth development.

== International career ==
Namoff made his United States national-team debut as a 63rd-minute substitute in a 3–1 win against Denmark on January 20, 2007.

== Honors ==
=== D.C. United ===
- Major League Soccer MLS Cup (1): 2004
- Major League Soccer Supporter's Shield (2): 2006, 2007
- Lamar Hunt U.S. Open Cup (1): 2008
