= Roger Levesque =

American soccer player (born 1981)

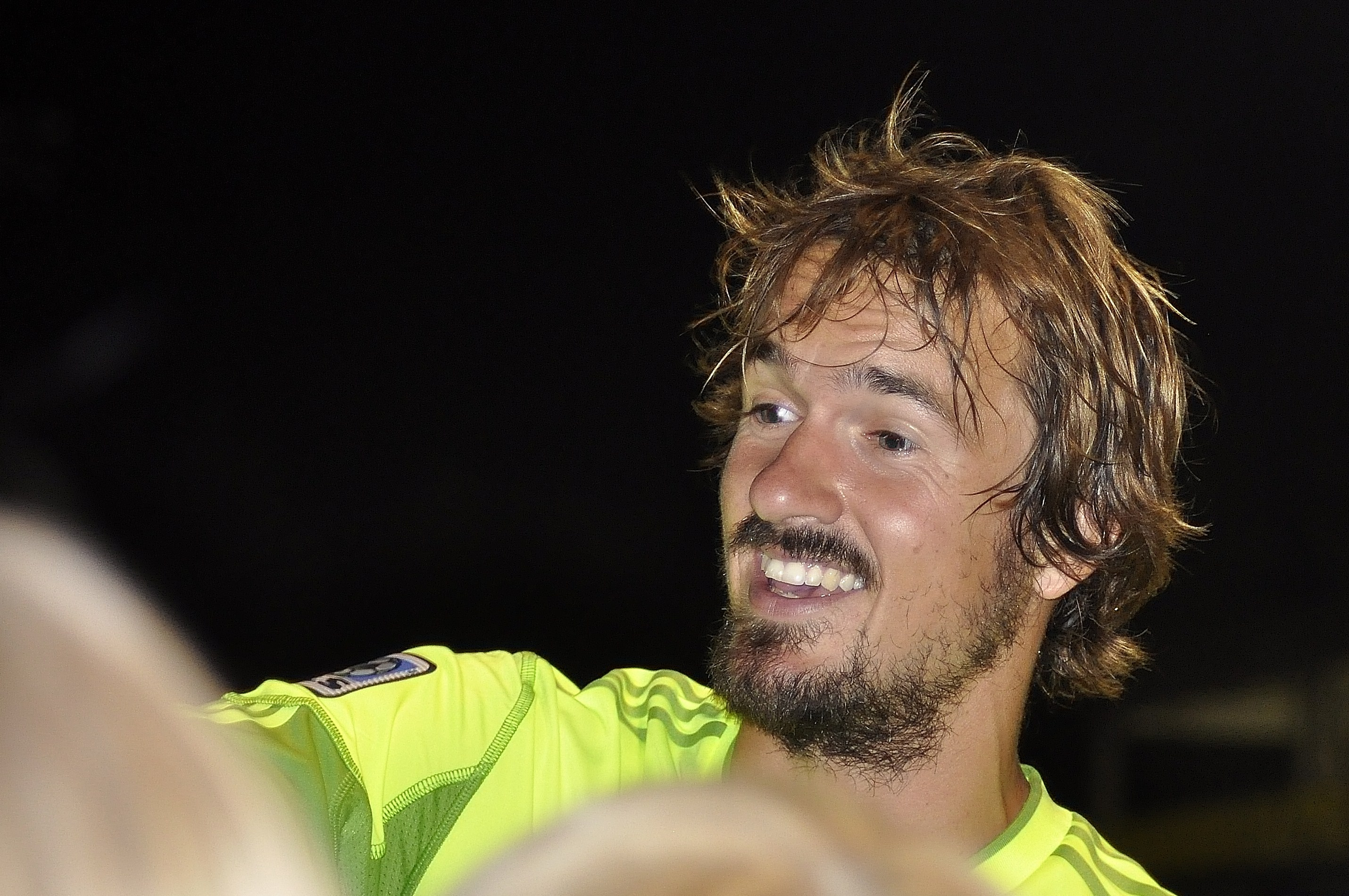

Personal information
- Date of birth: January 22, 1981 (age 45)
- Place of birth: Portland, Maine, United States
- Height: 6 ft 1 in (1.85 m)
- Positions: Midfielder; forward

College career
| Years | Team | Apps | (Gls) |
| 1999–2002 | Stanford Cardinal | 76 | (29) |

Senior career*
| Years | Team | Apps | (Gls) |
| 2003–2005 | San Jose Earthquakes | 4 | (0) |
| 2003–2005 | → Seattle Sounders (loan) | 73 | (23) |
| 2006–2008 | Seattle Sounders | 71 | (11) |
| 2009–2012 | Seattle Sounders FC | 53 | (6) |
| Total | | 201 | (40) |

International career
| 2002 | United States U23 | 2 | (0) |
- * Club domestic league appearances and goals

Roger Levesque (born January 22, 1981) is an American former soccer player who played most of his career with the Seattle Sounders and its successor in Major League Soccer, Seattle Sounders FC.

On January 28, 2010, he was ranked 19th in the USL First Division Top 25 of the Decade, which announced a list of the best and most influential players of the previous decade. Levesque has become a Sounders fan favorite for his work rate, length of service with the club, his wit, and clever goal celebrations. His last game was Wednesday, July 18, 2012, in an exhibition match against Chelsea F.C.

After retiring from professional soccer, Levesque headed to the University of Washington's Foster School of Business to pursue a master's degree in business administration.

== Career ==
=== High school and college ===
Born in Portland, Maine, Levesque led Falmouth High School in Falmouth, Maine to the 1996 and 1997 Maine state championships. In 1998, he was selected the state player of the year by the Maine Sunday Telegram. His 106 goals over 4 years at Falmouth places him at second most goals in Maine history. Levesque was also a standout basketball player, twice named Maine's Class C player of the year by the Lewiston Sun Journal, and leading Falmouth to state titles in 1997, and 1998. Roger also played for Maine Coast United leading them to 3 state titles and earning interest from the national under-23 team.

Levesque played college soccer at Stanford University from 1999 to 2002. After two seasons as a reserve, Levesque became a starter as a junior, and ended the season as a second-team All-American, having scored 14 goals and 9 assists. In his senior year he led the team in points with 7 goals and 13 assists, and was named a third team All-American. Stanford lost to UCLA that year in the NCAA Final.

=== Professional ===
Levesque was selected 23rd overall in the 2003 MLS SuperDraft by the San Jose Earthquakes. Much of his rookie season was lost when he injured his ACL during a preseason game with the US under-23 national team in Portugal. He made his MLS debut on July 12, 2003, coming on as a substitute in a 2–0 home loss to the Colorado Rapids. He was loaned to the Seattle Sounders after the Earthquakes's loss to them in the 2003 Lamar Hunt U.S. Open Cup in August. He made his Sounders debut days later against the Portland Timbers and go on to play nine matches for the Sounders, scoring two goals before returning to the Earthquakes on September 24 and making two appearances. He was on the bench as an unused substitute when the Earthquakes won MLS Cup 2003.

He continued to play on loan with the Sounders in 2004 and 2005. In 2004, he scored 8 goals and 4 assists in 27 games as the team reached the A-League championship. He scored four goals for the Sounders in the 2005 USL First Division USL-1 playoffs. His three goals led Seattle past the Portland Timbers and his stoppage time goal was the winner as Seattle beat the Montreal Impact 2–1. Seattle went on to win the 2005 Championship. The Earthquakes placed Levesque on waivers on November 16, 2005, after he played only one game that season with their first team.

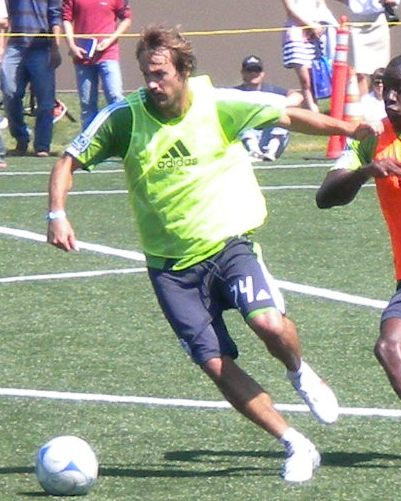
Levesque in training in 2009.

In February 2006, Levesque signed a year-long deal to return to Seattle Sounders. He scored two goals and three assists during the regular season and led the team in minutes played. In 2007, he was named second team All-League. At the end of the season, he served as a guest player in two exhibition games with USL-1 teams, the Vancouver Whitecaps and Portland Timbers, against MLS teams.

After a lengthy trial for most of early 2009, Levesque was signed by the expansion MLS franchise Seattle Sounders FC in March 2009. He was used primarily as a reserve player, occasionally appearing as a substitute or a starting player in games of lesser importance. He scored a goal against the Portland Timbers in the 2009 Lamar Hunt U.S. Open Cup, as well as the winning goal against D.C. United in the Open Cup Final. He also scored the winning goal in the 89th minute against D.C. United a year later in 2010 MLS league play. In June 2011, Levesque scored 2 goals in the Sounders' 4–2 win against the New York Red Bulls, including his famous "scuba goal" celebration. On July 16, 2011, he scored another goal against the Colorado Rapids.

Levesque announced his retirement in July 2012, playing his final match for the Sounders in a friendly against Chelsea F.C. on July 18. Fans celebrated the match, jokingly referring it to a testimonial, and King County Executive Dow Constantine declared "Roger Levesque Day" in his honor. Levesque was named Director of Community Outreach for Seattle Sounders FC in 2014.

== Honors ==
=== San Jose Earthquakes ===
- MLS Cup (1): 2003

=== Seattle Sounders ===
- A-League Western Conference Championship (1): 2004
- USL First Division Championship (2): 2005, 2007
- USL First Division Commissioner's Cup (1): 2007

=== Seattle Sounders FC ===
- Lamar Hunt U.S. Open Cup (3): 2009, 2010, 2011
