= Avery John =

Trinidad and Tobago footballer

Avery John CM
Personal information
- Full name: Emery Avery John
- Date of birth: 18 June 1975 (age 51)
- Place of birth: Point Fortin, Trinidad and Tobago
- Height: 6 ft 0 in (1.83 m)
- Position: Defender

College career
| Years | Team | Apps | (Gls) |
| 1994–1995 | Yavapai Roughriders | | |
| 1996–1999 | American Eagles | | |

Senior career*
| Years | Team | Apps | (Gls) |
| 1998 | New Orleans Storm | 0 | (0) |
| 1999 | Maryland Mania | | |
| 1999–2000 | Bohemians | 21 | (0) |
| 2000 | Boston Bulldogs | 11 | (0) |
| 2000–2001 | Shelbourne | 10 | (0) |
| 2001–2002 | Bohemians | 19 | (1) |
| 2002–2003 | Longford Town | 25 | (1) |
| 2004–2008 | New England Revolution | 75 | (0) |
| 2008 | Miami FC | 15 | (0) |
| 2009 | D.C. United | 6 | (0) |

International career
| 1996–2009 | Trinidad and Tobago | 65 | (0) |
- * Club domestic league appearances and goals

Emery Avery John CM (born 18 June 1975) is a Trinidad and Tobago former professional footballer who played as a defender.

== Career ==
=== Youth and college ===
John was born in Point Fortin. He attended Vessigny Government Secondary School and then Presentation College, and played college soccer for Yavapai College in Arizona and American University in Washington, DC. In his four seasons with American, John was named First Team All-Colonial Athletic Association and Second Team All-South Atlantic Region in his second year. In that same year, he helped win the CAA Championship and bring the team into the NCAA Quarterfinals.

=== Professional ===
In July 1998, John joined the New Orleans Storm of the USISL. In 2000, upon graduating, John played briefly in the American A-League, with the Steve Nicol-coached Boston Bulldogs. John spent much of his early professional career playing in the League of Ireland. John is perhaps best known in Ireland for playing for Bohemians, with whom he spent two spells and worked under three different managers. John was a fan favourite with Bohemians, where he became a cult figure who had several songs in his honour. John also had a brief spell with Shelbourne, and Longford Town after having been denied a work permit to sign for Colchester United following a successful preseason in 2002.

John moved to the United States to play for New England Revolution, and his old coach Steve Nicol, in Major League Soccer in 2004. John scored his first career goal in the 2004 MLS Cup Playoffs, helping New England win its first match 1-0 over the Columbus Crew in the Eastern Conference Semifinals.

With the Revolution, John was a regular member of the starting line-up in all his four years with the team, and despite with injuries, international duty, and occasional loss of form, never appeared in fewer than 10 games in a season.

On 1 May 2008, John signed with Miami FC of the USL First Division and played 15 games for the side. On 23 April 2009, he signed with D.C. United, after the team completed a trade for his rights. The Revolution, which had retained his MLS rights, traded those rights, in exchange for a conditional draft pick in either the 2010 or 2011 MLS SuperDraft. John was released by D.C. United on 20 January 2010.

=== International ===
John appeared in over 50 matches with the Trinidad and Tobago national team. In his first match at the 2006 FIFA World Cup, he was dismissed with his second yellow card for a rash tackle on Sweden's Christian Wilhelmsson, making John the first player to be sent off in the tournament and causing him to miss Trinidad and Tobago's high-profile game with England.

== Awards ==
As a member of the Trinidad and Tobago squad that competed at the 2006 FIFA World Cup in Germany, John was awarded the Chaconia Medal (Gold Class), the second highest state decoration of Trinidad and Tobago.
