= Barra (surname) =

Barra is a surname. Notable people with the surname include:

- Alerrandro Barra Mansa (born 2000), Brazilian footballer
- Allen Barra, American journalist and author of sports books
- Bruno Barra (born 1986), Brazilian professional footballer
- Caesar B. F. Barra (1880–1949), Italian-American lawyer and politician
- Carlos Barra (born 1968), Mexican professional football manager and former player
- Didier Barra (1590–1656), French Renaissance painter
- Djambu Barra Barra (1946–2005), Indigenous Australian artist
- Gianfranco Barra (1940–2025), Italian actor
- Héctor Barra (born 1978), Chilean former footballer
- Hugo Barra, Brazilian computer scientist, technology executive, and entrepreneur
- Jean-Pierre Barra (born 1939), Belgian sprinter
- Johan Bara (1581–1634), Dutch painter, designer, and engraver whose name is often written "Barra"
- Jorge Medina Barra (1968–2022), Bolivian civil rights activist and politician
- Joseph Bara (1779–1793), a hero of the French Revolution whose name is often written "Barra"
- Manuel Felguérez Barra (1928–2020), Mexican abstract artist
- Mary Barra (born 1961), CEO of General Motors
- Mubarkah Bent al-Barra (born 1957), Mauritanian poet and translator
- Ornella Barra (born 1953), Italian-born Monegasque businesswoman
- Pasquale Barra (1942–2015), former NCO hitman and pentito
- Paula Barra, German film actress
- Pedro Barra, Chilean football manager
- Peppe Barra (born 1944), Italian folk singer, actor, playwright, and composer
- Pierrot Barra (1942–1999), Haitian Vodou artist and priest
- Ray Barra (1930–2025), American ballet dancer and ballet director
- Robert Barra (born 1960), New York politician
- Roberto Muñoz Barra (born 1936), Chilean politician
- Rodolfo Barra (born 1947), Argentine politician
- Rodrigo Barra (born 1975), Chilean professional footballer
- Rogério Barra (born 1984), Brazilian politician
- Rolando Barra (born 1987), Bolivian football defender
- Tati Barra (born 1989), Brazilian politician

== See also ==
- De Barra
- De la Barra
- Barra (given name)
- Barra (disambiguation)
- Barras (surname)
