= 2010 D.C. United season =

D.C. United
2010 season
- General manager: Dave Kasper
- Head coach: Ben Olsen
- Stadium: RFK Stadium
- MLS: Conference: 8th Overall: 16th
- MLS Cup: Did not qualify
- U.S. Open Cup: Semifinalis
- Carolina Challenge Cup: Winners
- Atlantic Cup: Runners-up
- Top goalscorer: League: Andy Najar (5); All: Danny Allsopp (8)
- Highest home attendance: 30,367 vs. Milan (May 25; Exhibition)
- Lowest home attendance: 2,089 vs. Harrisburg City (July 21; U.S. Open Cup)
- Average home league attendance: 14,479
Home colors	Away colors

The 2010 D.C. United season was the club's 16th year of existence, as well as their 15th season in Major League Soccer, and their 15th consecutive season in the top flight of American soccer.

After three seasons with Tom Soehn, Soehn resigned from duty on mutual agreement, and became the Athletic Director for the Vancouver Whitecaps FC. On December 28, 2009, United announced the signing of Curt Onalfo, the former Kansas City Wizards coach who had previously been fired following a 6–0 defeat to Dallas in August 2009.

United began the season by with a 4–0 defeat from Kansas City at CommunityAmerica Ballpark on March 27. Their final match was a 3–2 loss to Toronto at RFK Stadium on October 23. Statistically, the 2010 season was United's worst overall season on record in MLS, tallying a record 20 losses, and 17 games being shut out, which broke the original record of 15. United also set the record for fewest goals scored in an MLS season (21) shattering the old record set by Toronto in 2007 when the Reds only scored 24. The poor record resulted in their head coach, Onalfo, being fired on August 4, becoming the first United coach in history to be fired during a regular season. Subsequently, Ben Olsen became the interim coach for the remainder of the season.

Although the team had an abysmal regular season showing, they excelled in U.S. Open Cup competition, making a run to the semifinals, before bowing out against Columbus.

== Background ==
=== Preseason ===
To prepare for the 2010 season, United participated in the Carolina Challenge Cup, hosted friendlies at the IMG Academy in Florida, as well as traveled to Mexico to take on Santos Laguna.

=== Regular season ===
==== March–April ====
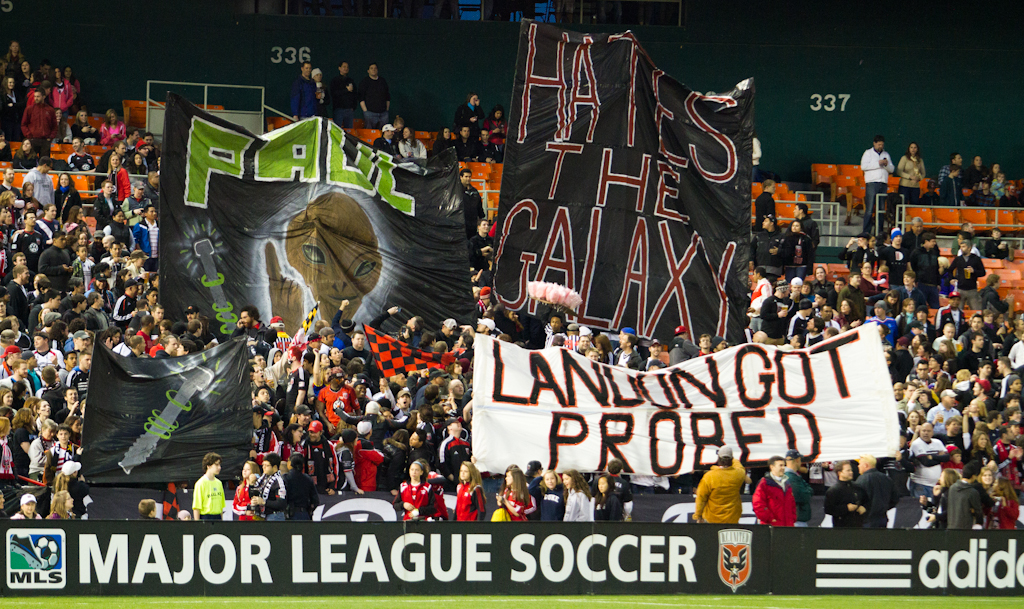
La Barra Brava display a tifo referencing the 2011 film Paul during a match against the L.A. Galaxy

D.C. United began their fifteenth Major League Soccer regular season on the road with a match against the Kansas City Wizards on March 27, 2010 followed by their first home match against the New England Revolution on April 3, 2010. Then they faced the Philadelphia Union. United would drop three more consecutive season games in April, which led the club off to a 0–5–0 start, their worst in franchise history.

Their first match of April was on April 3, where United fell late against the Revolution thanks to two goals from Kevin Mansally in the 80th and 82nd minutes. It was the first time in seven years that United fell at home against the Revolution.

On April 10, United traveled out to Philadelphia to take on an expansion MLS franchise, the Philadelphia Union, at Lincoln Financial Field. In front of a crowd of 34,000, United lost 3–2 in the Union's home-opener. In spite of the loss, goals from Santino Quaranta and Jaime Moreno accounted for United's first goals of the 2010 season.

A week later, United had their worst start of the season, falling 2–0 to the Chicago Fire at home, giving the club an 0–3–0 home record, and a 0–2–0 away record. In spite of the poor start, there were some signs of good things to come, with United taking in their first victory since the Carolina Challenge Cup during a U.S. Open Cup play-on proper match against Dallas on April 28. There, United took a 4–2 win, and edged closer to Open Cup qualification.

==== May ====
May started off on poor terms for United. On May 1, in an Atlantic Cup derby match against New York Red Bulls, United lost at home to the Red Bulls for the first time since 2003, as well as broke their 1996 record for worst start of the season, losing their first five matches.

Onalfo received sharp criticism from fans and the media alike, but expressed hope and optimism for a turnaround during the season. Some minor hope was restored on May 5, when United avenged their four-goal defeat against Kansas City earlier in March. Thanks to a pair of goals from the recently acquired Danny Allsopp, United won 2–1, as the Wizards became the first MLS club to lose to United since March.

You know, we're just not clicking right now. Maybe we're going to have to sacrifice some goats or some chickens, because we have to get this [losing streak] off of us. You have to stay positive, we have to keep our heads up, because we have to learn and we a young team that can learn from our mistakes.

— Troy Perkins, D.C. United goalkeeper following their 0–5–0 start, subsequent to their 2–0 defeat to New York Red Bulls.

United remained in the cellar of the Eastern Conference, as well as the overall standings, as they lost their next three games: two in Texas and one at home. Frustration continued to mount as their May 8 and May 15 matches against Dallas and Colorado, respectively, both ended in one-goal defeats.

A 2–0 loss in Houston left United far in last with goals scored (5) and far in front with goals allowed (16).

Amid a poor start to the season, United scheduled a friendly against A.C. Milan. Despite missing several of their regular starters and expectations of a one-sided match, United would pull of a shock 3–2 victory over Milan in front of nearly 31,000 fans at RFK Stadium.

The confidence from the Milan-match benefited United in their next two matches; a May 29 come-from-behind victory hosting Chivas USA and a U.S. Open Cup qualifier against Real Salt Lake on June 2.

==== June ====
June began with a pair of matches against Real Salt Lake; one for the U.S. Open Cup, and another for the regular season; both at RFK Stadium. The Open Cup match was played on June 2, with United beating Real Salt Lake 2–1, thanks an Andy Najar-goal after extra time. Three days later, the two sides would play again at the same venue, with the teams drawing no goals apiece.

The success continued from their three victories in the past four games, with United winning their first game on the road for the 2010 season. Before the World Cup break, United defeated the Seattle Sounders FC 3–2 at Qwest Field; a game where United had a three-goal lead thanks a hat trick from Chris Pontius, his first of his career.

During the World Cup break, United scheduled an exhibition match against El Salvador's national team as a fundraiser for the Spanish Catholic Center and United for D.C. United would win the friendly thanks to Adam Christman's lone goal in the 54th minute of play. It has been alleged that many of the Salvadorean players colluded to throw the match. Following the break, United would travel to Columbus to take on the Crew, where they would fall 2–0, accounting for their first and only loss of the month.

United ended the month with a 2–0 victory against the Richmond Kickers at George Mason Stadium. The match was a U.S. Open Cup fourth round match, and United would then play Harrisburg City on July 8 at the Maryland SoccerPlex. With a record of 4–1–1 in all competitions in June, it was United's most successful month of the year.

==== July ====
United started off the fourth month of their campaign on level terms that continued from June. This included a pair of back-to-back road draws at San Jose on July 3 and against their rivals the New York Red Bulls on July 10.

Although they grabbed two road points, they lost consecutively at home. On July 15, a late 89th-minute shot from Roger Levesque gave the Seattle Sounders FC a 1–0 victory over United. Goals from Landon Donovan and Edson Buddle of Los Angeles gave the Galaxy a 2–1 victory against United. The two losses saw United return to last place, relinquishing their brief stint in 14th and 15th place.

Despite their lack of victory during the month, they continued to find success in the U.S. Open Cup in which United won their quarterfinal-match on July 21 against USL Second Division's Harrisburg City, 2–0. The victory would send United to play against Columbus later next month.

The success in the U.S. Open Cup mounted as they thrashed Premier League-relegated Portsmouth 4–0 on July 24. Some was to blame the lack of sleep and lost luggage from Portsmouth during their North American Tour.

United ended a stony note when traveling to Rio Tinto on July 31 to take on the second-place Real Salt Lake. Goals from RSL's panel of stars including Robbie Findley and Alvaro Saborio saw United crash to a 3–0 defeat to end the month.

==== August ====
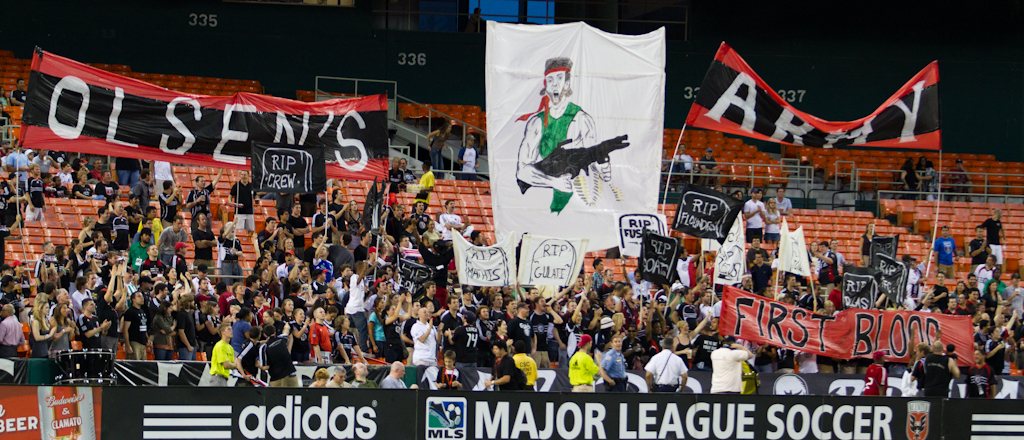
La Barra Brava display a tifo supporting head coach Ben Olsen during a match against FC Dallas

On August 5, following a league-worst 3–12–3 start to the season, head coach Curt Onlafo was fired. Subsequently, ex-D.C. United player, and assistant coach Ben Olsen became interim head coach for the remainder of the season. His first game as interim head coach was the August 7 league match against New England.

United then dropped another home match against FC Dallas, 3–1 on August 14 before achieving their first win a week later.

Under Olsen's leadership, United earned their first win in over two months in a 2–0 victory over local rivals, the Philadelphia Union on August 22. Danny Allsopp netted both goals, leading him to be the club's scoring leader for the season. The win was soon negated by a 1–0 loss at Chivas USA a few days later.

In hope to salvage their abysmal season, United played a full strength lineup in the U.S. Open Cup semifinals against Eastern Conference-rival Columbus Crew. Thanks to Hernández's 13th-minute penalty kick, United took a 1–0 lead over Columbus for nearly the entire match; however, in the last minute of play, an own goal by Mark Burch forced the game to go into overtime, where a penalty kick from the Crew's captain, Guillermo Barros Schelotto, ultimately led United to bow out of the tournament.

The 2–1 defeat to Columbus made it the first time since 2007 United failed to reach the Open Cup finals. The loss ultimately has made it incredibly difficult and arduous to qualify for the 2011–12 edition of the CONCACAF Champions League.

==== September ====
United would start the month off play against Columbus, once again, at home. A 23rd-minute mishap from keeper Bill Hamid was capitalized by Guillermo Barros Schelotto, which proved to be the difference in the match.

Following the match, having no change for a U.S. Open Cup title, nor a chance to qualify for the 2011–12 CONCACAF Champions League, United took the role of playing the spoiler team, seeing there was virtually little to no chance in qualifying for the play-offs. On September 11, United faced long odds when playing at Toronto FC's BMO Field, where the Reds had only surrendered one loss all season; a 1–4 defeat to New York Red Bulls. In spite of this, an 82nd-minute header from Julius James kept United's slim play-off hopes alive, and increased the gap between Seattle and Toronto in their play-off chase.

Things would not get easier for United, as they would then have to travel to Los Angeles to take on the MLS-league leaders. Thanks to Andy Najar's 60th-minute opener, it seemed as if United would accomplish perhaps the greatest upset during the MLS season. It would fail to be the case thanks to two quick goals from Galaxy captain, Landon Donovan, who netted a pair of goals in the 81st and 86th minute; giving LA the 2–1 victory over the Black-and-Red.

The loss saw United drop to 5–17–3, and mathematically eliminated the club from playoff contention.

A 3–1 home loss against Houston Dynamo on September 25 resulted in United being five points behind Chivas USA, the 15th-place MLS club; the farthest United had been out of last place all season.

==== October ====
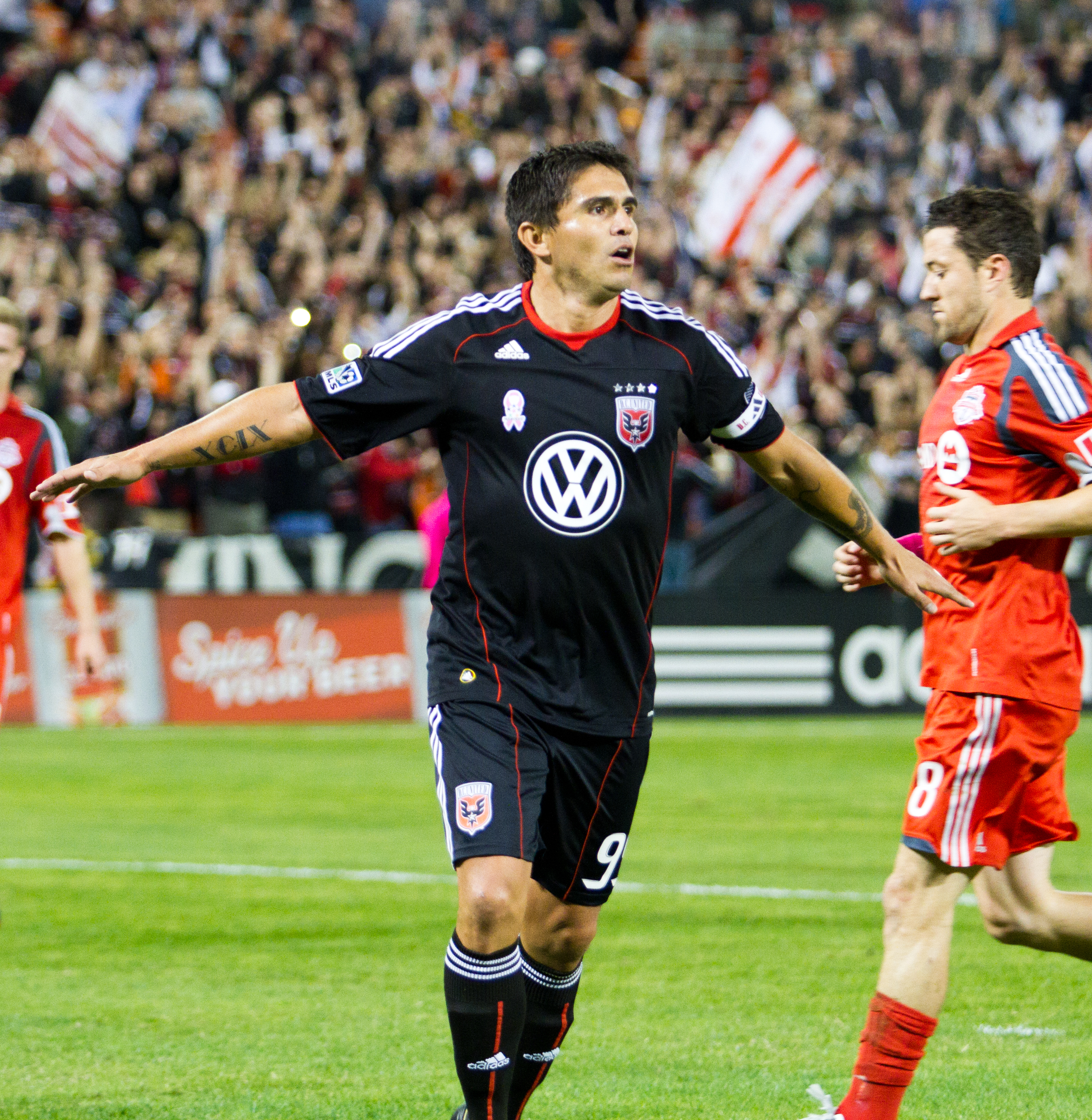
Moreno celebrating his 133rd career goal during his final professional game

United would win 1–0 against Colorado Rapids and not give up a goal after scoring. Danny Allsopp scored. It was their first away win in Colorado since 2001.

During the majority of the month, the club began to work on rebuilding plans for the team. This started out with the signing of Guyanese international, JP Rodrigues on loan from Miami FC of the USSF D2 Pro League. They also signed Junior from Brazil.

D.C. United lost its 19th game 2–0 to San Jose, marking their tenth loss at home, a team worst, as well as the 16th time this season they were shut out, an MLS record. Although United nabbed another point on the road at Chicago Fire to further improve their road record, United grew the MLS record for most shut-outs in a single season (17). The match was Brian McBride's farewell match in Toyota Park.

In Jaime Moreno's final match of his 14-year career with D.C., he started and played 80 minutes in the club's season finale against Toronto FC. Moreno scored on a penalty kick in the 38th minute, but United dropped their 11th at home and their 20th overall to end the season, 3–2.

==== November ====
On November 3, midfielder Andy Najar won the Rookie of the Year Award, ahead of fellow rivals New York's defender, Tim Ream and Philadelphia Union's striker, Danny Mwanga. He was the first United player to win the award since Ben Olsen did so in 1998.

Two weeks later, on November 15, the United and striker Danny Allsopp mutually agreed to terminate his contract valued at $217,000 guaranteed pay from the club. Allsopp was expected to return to Australia's A-League.

== Club ==
=== 2010 roster ===
Note: Flags indicate national team as defined under FIFA eligibility rules; some limited exceptions apply. Players may hold more than one non-FIFA nationality.

No.	Pos.	Nation	Player
1	GK	USA	Chase Harrison
2	DF	TRI	Julius James
3	DF	BOL	Juan Manuel Peña
4	DF	USA	Marc Burch
5	DF	CAN	Dejan Jakovic
6	MF	CRC	Kurt Morsink
7	FW	USA	Adam Cristman
9	FW	AUS	Danny Allsopp
11	MF	ESP	Carlos Varela
12	MF	SLV	Christian Castillo
12	DF	USA	Jed Zayner
13	FW	USA	Chris Pontius
14	MF	HON	Andy Najar
15	DF	USA	Barry Rice
16	DF	USA	Jordan Graye

No.	Pos.	Nation	Player
17	MF	USA	Conor Shanosky
18	DF	USA	Devon McTavish
19	MF	USA	Clyde Simms
20	MF	USA	Stephen King
21	FW	ARG	Pablo Hernández (on loan from Defensor Sporting)
22	MF	CRC	Rodney Wallace
23	GK	USA	Troy Perkins
24	MF	USA	Brandon Barklage
25	MF	USA	Santino Quaranta
27	MF	MNE	Branko Bošković
28	GK	USA	Bill Hamid
30	MF	BRA	Junior Carreiro
31	DF	GUY	J. P. Rodrigues (on loan from Miami FC)
99	FW	BOL	Jaime Moreno (captain)

=== Current technical staff ===
Position	Staff
Head Coach	(United States) Ben Olsen
Assistant Coach & Technical Director	(United States) Chad Ashton
Assistant Coach	(United States) Kris Kelderman
Assistant Coach	(United States) Mark Simpson
General Manager	(United States) Dave Kasper
Team Administrator	(Bolivia) Francisco Tobár
Managing Director	(United States) Erik Stover
Fitness Coach	(United States) Randy Rocha
Athletic Trainer	(United States) Brian Goodstein
Asst. Athletic & Fitness Trainer	(Canada) Pete Calabrese
Team Operations	(Costa Rica) Steve Olivarez

Last updated: September 19
Source: D.C. United Official Website

== Transfers ==
=== In ===
Date	Player	Previous club	Fee	Ref
January 8, 2010	(Australia) Danny Allsopp	(Qatar) Al-Rayyan	Undisclosed	
January 14, 2010	(United States) Troy Perkins	(Norway) Vålerenga	Undisclosed	
January 14, 2010	(United States) Jordan Graye	(United States) North Carolina Tar Heels	Drafted	
January 21, 2010	(Belgium) Floribert N'Galula	(Netherlands) Sparta Rotterdam	Free	
February 3, 2010	(United States) Adam Cristman	(United States) Kansas City Wizards	Trade	
March 5, 2010	(Costa Rica) Kurt Morsink	(United States) Kansas City Wizards	Free	
March 17, 2010	(Jamaica) Lyle Adams	(United States) Austin Aztex	Free	
March 22, 2010	(Honduras) Andy Najar	(United States) D.C. United U-20's	Academy	
March 25, 2010	(Bolivia) Juan Manuel Peña	(Spain) Celta de Vigo	Free	
April 28, 2010	(Brazil) Luciano Emilio	(Brazil) Rio Branco	Undisclosed	
April 30, 2010	(United States) Stephen King	(United States) Seattle Sounders FC	Trade	
June 14, 2010	(Montenegro) Branko Bošković	(Austria) Rapid Wein	Free	
August 5, 2010	(United States) Jed Zayner	(United States) Columbus Crew	Trade	
August 13, 2010	(United States) Conor Shanosky	(United States) D.C. United U-20's	Academy	
September 14, 2010	(Spain) Carlos Varela	(Switzerland) Xamax	Free	
September 15, 2010	(Brazil) Junior	(Brazil) Náutico	Undisclosed	

=== Out ===
Date	Player	Destination club	Fee	Ref
November 20, 2009	(United States) Ben Olsen	Retired	Retired	
November 27, 2009	(United States) Andrew Jacobson	(United States) Philadelphia Union	Expansion Draft	
December 23, 2009	(United States) Greg Janicki	(Canada) Vancouver Whitecaps FC	Pre-Draft Trade	
January 10, 2010	(Brazil) Luciano Emilio	(Brazil) Rio Blanco	Free	
January 11, 2010	(Democratic Republic of the Congo) Ange N'Silu	(Switzerland) FCL Mont	Released	
January 11, 2010	(Serbia) Miloš Kočić	(Canada) Toronto	Released	
January 13, 2010	(Brazil) Fred	(United States) Philadelphia Union	Pre-draft Trade	
January 20, 2010	(Burundi) David Habarugira	(Belgium) Brussels	Released	
March 5, 2010	(United States) John DiRaimondo	(United States) Richmond Kickers	Released	
March 6, 2010	(Belgium) Floribert N'Galula	(Finland) TPS	Released	
March 31, 2010	(United States) Ely Allen	(United States) NSC Minnesota	Undisclosed	
April 16, 2010	(United States) Josh Wicks	(Finland) Mariehamn	Released	
April 30, 2010	(South Africa) Ty Shipalane	(United States) Harrisburg City	Released	
April 30, 2010	(Jamaica) Lyle Adams	Retired	Released	
July 16, 2010	(Brazil) Luciano Emilio	(Uruguay) Danubio	Free	
June 29, 2010	(El Salvador) Christian Castillo	(El Salvador) Alianza	Released	
July 27, 2010	(South Africa) Thabiso Khumalo	(United States) Louisville Lightning	Released	
September 16, 2010	(United States) Carey Talley	(United States) New York Red Bulls	Trade	

=== Loan ===
==== In ====
Player	From	Start	End	Ref
(El Salvador) Cristian Castillo	(Mexico) León	December 18, 2009	June 29, 2010	
(Argentina) Pablo Hernández	(Uruguay) Defensor Sporting	July 1, 2010	December 31, 2010	
(Guyana) JP Rodrigues	(United States) Miami	October 1, 2010	December 31, 2010	

==== Out ====
Player	Loaned to	Start	End	Ref
(South Africa) Ty Shipalane	(United States) Richmond Kickers	April 16, 2010	April 20, 2010	

== Statistics ==
=== Appearances and goals ===
Last updated on November 7.

No.	Pos	Nat	Player	Total		Major League Soccer		U.S. Open Cup		Carolina Challenge Cup	
No.	Pos	Nat	Player	Apps	Goals	Apps	Goals	Apps	Goals	Apps	Goals
1	GK	(United States) USA	Chase Harrison	0	0	0	0	0	0	0	0
2	DF	(Trinidad and Tobago) TRI	Julius James	29	1	22	1	4	0	3	0
3	DF	(Bolivia) BOL	Juan Manuel Peña	14	0	10	0	1	0	3	0
4	DF	(United States) USA	Marc Burch	5	0	5	0	0	0	0	0
5	DF	(Canada) CAN	Dejan Jakovic	24	0	19	0	2	0	3	0
6	MF	(Costa Rica) CRC	Kurt Morsink	27	0	20	0	5	0	2	0
7	FW	(United States) USA	Adam Cristman	25	4	17	2	6	2	2	0
9	FW	(Australia) AUS	Danny Allsopp	28	9	22	5	6	4	0	0
11	MF	(Spain) ESP	Carlos Varela	5	0	5	0	0	0	0	0
12	MF	(El Salvador) SLV	Christian Castillo	15	1	10	0	2	1	3	0
12	DF	(United States) USA	Jed Zayner	16	0	14	0	2	0	0	0
13	FW	(United States) USA	Chris Pontius	20	3	17	3	3	0	0	0
14	MF	(Honduras) HON	Andy Najar	32	7	26	5	6	2	0	0
16	DF	(United States) USA	Jordan Graye	27	0	20	0	4	0	3	0
17	MF	(United States) USA	Conor Shanosky	0	0	0	0	0	0	0	0
18	DF	(United States) USA	Devon McTavish	25	0	19	0	3	0	3	0
19	MF	(United States) USA	Clyde Simms	26	1	20	0	6	1	0	0
20	MF	(United States) USA	Stephen King	24	0	19	0	2	0	3	0
21	MF	(Argentina) ARG	Pablo Hernández	16	1	14	0	2	1	0	0
22	DF	(Costa Rica) CRC	Rodney Wallace	16	0	12	0	4	0	0	0
23	GK	(United States) USA	Troy Perkins	28	0	22	0	3	0	3	0
24	MF	(United States) USA	Brandon Barklage	4	0	3	0	1	0	0	0
25	MF	(United States) USA	Santino Quaranta	36	3	27	2	6	1	3	0
27	MF	(Montenegro) MNE	Branko Bošković	16	1	13	0	3	1	0	0
28	GK	(United States) USA	Bill Hamid	11	0	8	0	3	0	0	0
30	MF	(Brazil) BRA	Junior Carreiro	6	0	3	0	3	0	0	0
31	DF	(Guyana) GUY	J.P. Rodrigues	1	0	1	0	0	0	0	0
99	FW	(Bolivia) BOL	Jaime Moreno	28	9	21	4	4	1	3	4

=== Top scorers ===
Includes all competitive matches. The list is sorted by competition level when total goals are equal.

Last updated on October 24, 2010.

Position	Nation	Number	Name	MLS	U.S. Open Cup	Carolina Challenge Cup	Total
1	(Australia)	9	Danny Allsopp	5	4	0	9
3	(Honduras)	11	Andy Najar	5	2	0	7
3	(Bolivia)	99	Jaime Moreno	2	1	4	7
4	(United States)	7	Adam Cristman	2	2	0	4
5	(United States)	13	Chris Pontius	3	0	0	3
6	(United States)	25	Santino Quaranta	2	1	0	3
7	(Trinidad and Tobago)	2	Julius James	1	0	0	1
=	(Montenegro)	27	Branko Bošković	0	1	0	1
=	(El Salvador)	–	Christian Castillo	0	1	0	1
=	(Brazil)	–	Luciano Emilio	0	1	0	1
=	(Argentina)	21	Pablo Hernández	0	1	0	1
=	(South Africa)	–	Thabiso Khumalo	0	1	0	1

=== Disciplinary ===
Includes all competitive matches. Players with 1 card or more included only.

Last updated on November 1, 2010

Position	Nation	Number	Name	MLS		U.S. Open Cup		Carolina Challenge Cup		Total (USSF Total)	
Position	Nation	Number	Name	Booked	Sent off (straight red)	Booked	Sent off (straight red)	Booked	Sent off (straight red)	Booked	Sent off (straight red)
DF	(Trinidad and Tobago)	2	Julius James	7	0	0	1			7	1
MF	(Honduras)	14	Andy Najar	6	0	0	0	0	0	6	0
MF	(Costa Rica)	6	Kurt Morsink	5	0	2	0	0	0	7	0
MF	(United States)	25	Santino Quaranta	5	0	0	0	0	0	5	0
DF	(United States)	–	Carey Talley	3	0	0	0	0	0	3	0
FW	(Australia)	9	Danny Allsopp	2	0	1	0	0	0	3	0
FW	(El Salvador)	–	Cristian Castillo	2	0	0	0	0	0	2	0
FW	(Bolivia)	99	Jaime Moreno	1	1	0	0	0	0	1	1
DF	(Canada)	5	Dejan Jakovic	1	1	0	0	0	0	1	1
MF	(United States)	4	Marc Burch	1	0	0	0	0	0	1	0
FW	(United States)	13	Chris Pontius	1	0	0	0	0	0	1	0
DF	(United States)	16	Jordan Graye	1	0	0	0	0	0	1	0
DF	(United States)	18	Devon McTavish	1	0	0	0	0	0	1	0
MF	(United States)	20	Stephen King	1	0	0	0	0	0	1	0
MF	(United States)	24	Brandon Barklage	1	0	0	0	0	0	1	0
DF	(Montenegro)	27	Branko Bošković	1	0	0	0	0	0	1	0
			TOTALS	49	2	3	1	0	0	52	3

=== Formation ===
Starting XI vs. Chicago Fire on Oct. 16.

=== Overall ===
Games played	35 (30 MLS, 5 U.S. Open Cup)
Games won	10 (6 MLS, 4 U.S. Open Cup)
Games drawn	4 (4 MLS)
Games lost	21 (20 MLS, 1 U.S. Open Cup)
Goals scored	32
Goals conceded	52
Goal difference	−20
Clean sheets	8
Yellow cards	49
Red cards	2
Worst discipline	(Trinidad and Tobago) Julius James 7 (yellow card) 0 (red card)
Best result(s)	W 2–0 (H) v Philadelphia – Major League Soccer – August 22, 2010
Worst result(s)	L 4–0 (A) v Kansas City – Major League Soccer – March 17, 2010
Most appearances	(United States) Santino Quaranta (34)
Top scorer	(Australia) Danny Allsopp (8)
Points	Overall: 22/90 (24.44%)

Last updated: November 19, 2010
Source: Competitions' Wikipedia articles.

== Competitions ==
Competition	Started round	Current position / round	Final position / round	First match	Last match
MLS	—	—	16th	March 27	October 23
U.S. Open Cup	Qualifier	—	Semifinals	April 28	September 1

Updated to match played November 13, 2010
Source: Competitions

=== Preseason ===
Win Tie Loss

February 13, 2010	D.C. United	0–1	Columbus	Bradenton, Florida
12:00 pm		Report	8' (o.g.) McTavish	Stadium: IMG Academy

February 17, 2010	D.C. United	0–0	Toronto	Bradenton, Florida
2:30 pm		Report		Stadium: IMG Academy

February 20, 2010	D.C. United	0–0	New York	Bradenton, Florida
2:30 pm		Report		Stadium: IMG Academy

February 26, 2010	United States U-17	2–5	D.C. United	Bradenton, Florida
9:00 am	Mion 4'; Rodriguez 40'	Report	16', 26' Khumalo; 25' (pen.) DiRaimondo; 62' Cristman; 70' Shipalane	Stadium: IMG Academy

February 26, 2010	Florida Gulf Coast Eagles	0–1	D.C. United	Bradenton, Florida
11:00 am		Report	4' Jakovic	Stadium: IMG Academy

March 10, 2010	Santos Laguna	2–3	D.C. United	Torreón, Mexico
7:30 pm	Torres 54'; Quintero 63'		23' Pontius; 35' Moreno; 70' Khumalo	Stadium: Estadio Corona; Attendance: 30,050

=== Carolina Challenge Cup ===
March 13, 2010	D.C. United	2–1	Real Salt Lake	Charleston, South Carolina
5:00 pm	Moreno 77', 88'	Report #1; Report #2	40' (pen.) Findley	Stadium: Blackbaud Stadium; Attendance: 915

March 17, 2010	Toronto	0–1	D.C. United	Charleston, South Carolina
7:15 pm		Report #1; Report #2	62' Moreno	Stadium: Blackbaud Stadium; Attendance: 864

March 20, 2010	D.C. United	2–0	Charleston	Charleston, South Carolina
7:15 pm	33', 45' (pen.) Moreno	Report #1; Report #2		Stadium: Blackbaud Stadium; Attendance: 1,644

=== Major League Soccer ===
D.C. United's fifteenth season in Major League Soccer began on March 27 and ended on October 23. United finished in last place in both the Eastern Conference and the overall standings, for the first time since the 2002 season.

==== League table ====
Conference

Pos	Team	Pld	W	L	T	GF	GA	GD	Pts	Qualification
1	New York Red Bulls	30	15	9	6	38	29	+9	51	MLS Cup Playoffs
2	Columbus Crew	30	14	8	8	40	34	+6	50	MLS Cup Playoffs
3	Kansas City Wizards	30	11	13	6	36	35	+1	39	
4	Chicago Fire	30	9	12	9	37	38	−1	36	
5	Toronto FC	30	9	13	8	33	41	−8	35	
6	New England Revolution	30	9	16	5	32	50	−18	32	
7	Philadelphia Union	30	8	15	7	35	49	−14	31	
8	D.C. United	30	6	20	4	21	47	−26	22	

Source: MLS

Overall

Pos	Team	Pld	W	L	T	GF	GA	GD	Pts	Qualification
1	LA Galaxy (S)	30	18	7	5	44	26	+18	59	CONCACAF Champions League
2	Real Salt Lake	30	15	4	11	45	20	+25	56	
3	New York Red Bulls	30	15	9	6	38	29	+9	51	
4	FC Dallas	30	12	4	14	42	28	+14	50	CONCACAF Champions League
5	Columbus Crew	30	14	8	8	40	34	+6	50	
6	Seattle Sounders FC	30	14	10	6	39	35	+4	48	CONCACAF Champions League
7	Colorado Rapids (C)	30	12	8	10	44	32	+12	46	CONCACAF Champions League
8	San Jose Earthquakes	30	13	10	7	34	33	+1	46	
9	Kansas City Wizards	30	11	13	6	36	35	+1	39	
10	Chicago Fire	30	9	12	9	37	38	−1	36	
11	Toronto FC	30	9	13	8	33	41	−8	35	CONCACAF Champions League
12	Houston Dynamo	30	9	15	6	40	49	−9	33	
13	New England Revolution	30	9	16	5	32	50	−18	32	
14	Philadelphia Union	30	8	15	7	35	49	−14	31	
15	Chivas USA	30	8	18	4	31	45	−14	28	
16	D.C. United	30	6	20	4	21	47	−26	22	

Source: MLS
Rules for classification: 1) points; 2) head-to-head record; 3) goal difference; 4) number of goals scored
(C) Champions; (S) Supporters' Shield

==== Results summary ====
Overall								Home						Away					
Pld	Pts	W	L	T	GF	GA	GD	W	L	T	GF	GA	GD	W	L	T	GF	GA	GD
30	22	6	20	4	21	47	−26	3	11	1	12	25	−13	3	9	3	9	22	−13

Last updated: October 23, 2010
Source: MLSSoccer.com
Pld = Matches played; Pts = Points; W = Matches won; T = Matches tied; L = Matches lost; GF = Goals for; GA = Goals against; GD = Goal difference

==== Results by round ====
Round	1	2	3	4	5	6	7	8	9	10	11	12	13	14	15	16	17	18	19	20	21	22	23	24	25	26	27	28	29	30
Stadium	A	H	A	H	H	H	A	H	A	H	H	A	A	A	A	H	H	A	A	H	H	A	H	A	A	H	A	H	A	H
Result	L	L	L	L	L	W	L	L	L	W	T	W	L	T	T	L	L	L	L	L	W	L	L	W	L	L	W	L	T	L
Position	16	16	16	16	16	16	16	16	16	16	15	14	16	15	15	16	16	16	16	16	16	16	16	16	16	16	16	16	16	16

Updated to match(es) played on October 23, 2010. Source: MLS Results and League table
A = Away; H = Home; W = Win; L = Loss; T = Tie

March 27 1	Kansas City Wizards	4–0	D.C. United	Kansas City, KS
7:30 pm	Kamara 9' (yellow card) 82'; Arnaud 35'; Smith 54'; Jewsbury 70' (pen.)		Jakovic (yellow card) 26'; Morsink (yellow card) 28'; Quaranta (yellow card) 45+'; James (yellow card) 61'; Moreno (yellow card) 67'	Stadium: CommunityAmerica Ballpark; Attendance: 10,385; Referee: Kevin Stott

April 3 2	D.C. United	0–2	New England Revolution	Washington, DC
7;30 PM	Peña (yellow card) 86'		Mansally 80'; Mansally 82'	Stadium: RFK Stadium; Attendance: 20,664; Referee: Baldomero Toledo

April 10 3	Philadelphia Union	3–2	D.C. United	Philadelphia, PA
6:00 ET	Le Toux 4', 40', 80'; Arrieta (yellow card) 55'		Wallace (yellow card) 35'; Barklage (yellow card) 42'; Quaranta 63'; Moreno 70'; Quaranta (yellow card) 73'; Jakovic (red card) 79'; Cristman (yellow card) 89'	Stadium: Lincoln Financial Field; Attendance: 34,870; Referee: Terry Vaughn

April 17 4	D.C. United	0–2	Chicago Fire	Washington, DC
			Pappa 79'; McBride 89'	Stadium: RFK Stadium; Attendance: 18,407

May 1 5	D.C. United	0–2	New York Red Bulls	Washington, D.C.
			Ibrahim 51'; Angel 60'	Stadium: RFK Stadium; Attendance: 12,089

May 5 6	D.C. United	2–1	Kansas City Wizards	Washington, D.C.
	Allsopp 12' 34'		Kamara 90+2'	Stadium: RFK Stadium; Attendance: 10,038; Referee: (South Carolina) Alex Prus

May 8 7	FC Dallas	1–0	D.C. United	Frisco, Texas
	Cunningham 68'	Report		Stadium: Pizza Hut Park; Attendance: 10,323

May 15 8	D.C. United	0–1	Colorado Rapids	Washington, DC
		Report	Ballouchy 68'	Stadium: RFK Stadium; Attendance: 13,570

May 22 9	Houston Dynamo	2–0	D.C. United	Houston, Texas
6:30 pm CT	Cruz 10'; Oduro 55'			Stadium: Robertson Stadium; Attendance: 24,471

May 29 10	D.C. United	3–2	Chivas USA	Washington, DC
7:30 pm	Najar 26'; Cristman 76'; King (yellow card) 87'; Talley 90+2' (pen.)		Braun 17'; Trujilo (yellow card) 78'; Galindo 80'; Thornton (red card) 90'	Stadium: RFK Stadium; Attendance: 13,043; Referee: (Texas) Jasen Anno

June 5 11	D.C. United	0–0	Real Salt Lake	Washington, D.C.
7:30 pm		Report		Stadium: RFK Stadium; Attendance: 15,328; Referee: Jair Marrufo

June 10 12	Seattle Sounders FC	2–4	D.C. United	Seattle, WA
23:00 EST	Ljungberg (yellow card) 43'; Riley 90'; Montero 91+'	Report	Pontius (yellow card) 24' (goal) 39', 44', 79'; Najar 72' (yellow card) 62'	Stadium: Qwest Field; Attendance: 36,146; Referee: Michael Kennedy

June 26 13	Columbus	2–0	D.C. United	Columbus, Ohio
7:30 ET	Schelotto 57'; Brunner 87'	Report	Najar (yellow card) 52'	Stadium: Crew Stadium; Attendance: 15,335; Referee: Terry Vaughn

July 3 14	San Jose	1–1	D.C. United	Santa Clara, California
	Opara 16'	Report	Najar 54'	Stadium: Buck Shaw Stadium; Attendance: 10,304; Referee: David Gantar

July 10 15	New York	0–0	D.C. United	Harrison, New Jersey
19:30 ET		Report		Stadium: Red Bull Arena; Attendance: 16,239; Referee: Silviu Petrescu

July 15 16	D.C. United	0–1	Seattle	Washington, D.C.
		Report	Levesque 89'	Stadium: RFK Stadium; Attendance: 13,716

July 18 17	D.C. United	1–2	Los Angeles	Washington, D.C.
	Najar 54'	Report	Buddle 38'; Donovan 58'	Stadium: RFK Stadium; Attendance: 17,688

July 31 18	Real Salt Lake	3–0	D.C. United	Sandy, Utah
	Saborio 13'; Wingert (yellow card) 58'; Findley 79'; González 90+4'	Report	Talley (yellow card) 17'; Boskovic (yellow card) 17'; Najar (yellow card) 67'	Stadium: Rio Tinto Stadium; Attendance: 17,719

August 7 19	New England	1–0	D.C. United	Foxborough, Massachusetts
	Phelan 42'	Report		Stadium: Gillette Stadium; Attendance: 12,218; Referee: Terry Vaughn

August 14 20	D.C. United	1–3	Dallas	Washington, D.C.
	Benitez 80' (o.g.)	Report	Ferreira 36'; Alexander 49'; Cunningham 92+'	Stadium: RFK Stadium; Attendance: 12,474; Referee: Abiodun Okulaja

August 22 21	D.C. United	2–0	Philadelphia	Washington, D.C.
2:00 EDT	Allsopp 22', 62'; Zayner (yellow card) 70'; James (yellow card) 90+2'	Report		Stadium: RFK Stadium; Attendance: 12,165; Referee: (South Carolina) Alex Prus

August 29 22	Chivas USA	1–0	D.C. United	Carson, California
7:30 PDT	Braun 13' (yellow card) 73'; Saragosa (yellow card) 72'	Report	Najar (yellow card) 84'	Stadium: Home Depot Center; Attendance: 12,517; Referee: (California) Kevin Stott

September 4 23	D.C. United	0–1	Columbus	Washington, D.C.
7:30 EDT	Hernández (yellow card) 45+1'; Graye (yellow card) 57'	Report	Schelotto 23'; Francis (yellow card) 47'; Duka (yellow card) 57'	Stadium: RFK Stadium; Attendance: 12,075; Referee: (California) Hilario Grajeda

September 11 24	Toronto FC	0–1	D.C. United	Toronto, Canada
4:00 pm EST	de Guzman (yellow card) 53'	Report	James 81'	Stadium: BMO Field; Attendance: 20,395; Referee: (New Jersey) Michael Kennedy

September 18 25	LA Galaxy	2–1	D.C. United	Carson, CA
10:30 pm EST	Gonzalez (yellow card) 39'; Marshall (yellow card) 62'; Donovan 81', 86' (yellow card) 87'	Report	Najar 60'	Stadium: Home Depot Center; Attendance: 20,094; Referee: Ricardo Salazar

September 25 26	D.C. United	1–3	Houston Dynamo	Washington, D.C.
7:30 pm EDT	Najar 29' (yellow card) 69'; Zayner (yellow card) 79'; James (yellow card) 89'	Report	Cochrane (yellow card) 30'; Cameron 69' (yellow card) 90'; McTavish 66' (o.g.); Davis (yellow card) 82'; Oduro 90+10'	Stadium: RFK Stadium; Attendance: 13,828; Referee: Alex Prus

October 2 27	Colorado Rapids	0–1	D.C. United	Commerce City, CO
8:00 pm EST	Palguta (yellow card) 15'	Report	Allsopp 47'; McTavish (yellow card) 74'; Najar (yellow card) 85'	Stadium: Dick's Sporting Goods Park; Attendance: 15,478; Referee: Michael Kennedy

October 9 28	D.C. United	0–2	San Jose Earthquakes	Washington, DC
7:30 pm EDT	Moreno (red card) 7'	Report	Stephenson (yellow card) 3'; McDonald (red card) 7'; Wondolowski 45', 55'	Stadium: RFK Stadium; Attendance: 14,822; Referee: Alex Prus

October 16 29	Chicago Fire	0–0	D.C. United	Bridgeview, IL
4:00 pm EDT	Conde (yellow card) 37'	Report	Quaranta (yellow card) 5'	Stadium: Toyota Park; Attendance: 19,056; Referee: Mark Geiger

October 23 30	D.C. United	2–3	Toronto FC	Washington, DC
7:30 pm EDT	Quaranta 2'; Moreno 39' (pen.); James (yellow card) 56'	Report	dos Santos 23' de Guzman (yellow card) 38'; De Rosario 48', 65'; Lindsay (yellow card) 63'	Stadium: RFK Stadium; Attendance: 18,071; Referee: Silviu Petrescu
Note: Jamie Moreno's final game with D.C. United

=== U.S. Open Cup ===
April 28, 2010 First round	D.C. United (Washington, D.C.)	4–2	(Texas) Dallas	Washington, D.C.
7:30 pm EDT	4', 59' Cristman; (yellow card) 21' Morsink; (yellow card) 28' Wallace; 39' Castillo; 51' Najar	Report	Guarda 52'; McCarty 57' (pen.); Wallace (yellow card) 67'; Edward (yellow card) 72'	Stadium: RFK Stadium; Attendance: 2,804; Referee: (Rhode Island) Chris Penso

June 2, 2010 Second round	Real Salt Lake (Utah)	1–2 (a.e.t.)	(Washington, D.C.) D.C. United	Washington, D.C.
7:30 pm EDT	Beltran (yellow card) 70'; Warner (yellow card) 73'; Alexandre (yellow card) 77'; Johnson 81' (pen.)	(Report)	75' (pen.) Emilio; (yellow card) 90+3' Morsink; 107' Najar; (red card) 120+2' James	Stadium: RFK Stadium; Attendance: 3,074; Referee: (North Carolina) Mark Kadlecik

June 30, 2010 Third round	D.C. United (Washington, D.C.)	2–0	(Virginia) Richmond	Fairfax, Virginia
7:30 pm EDT	Moreno 47'; Quaranta 56'; Allsopp (yellow card) 72'		Kalungi (yellow card) 31'	Stadium: George Mason Stadium; Attendance: 2,985

July 21, 2010 Quarterfinals	D.C. United (Washington, D.C.)	2–0	(Pennsylvania) Harrisburg City	Boyds, Maryland
19:30	Bošković 1'; Khumalo 47'; Rice (yellow card) 62'	Report	Pelletier (yellow card) 23'; Noone (yellow card) 33'; Ruthven (red card) 75'	Stadium: Maryland SoccerPlex; Attendance: 2,089; Referee: (New Mexico) Hilario Grajeda

September 1, 2010 Semifinals	D.C. United (Washington, D.C.)	1–2 (a.e.t.)	(Ohio) Columbus	Washington, D.C.
19:30	Hernández 13' (pen.)		Burch 89' (o.g.); Schelotto 98' (pen.)	Stadium: RFK Stadium; Attendance: 3,411

=== Friendlies ===
May 28, 2010	D.C. United (United States)	3–2	(Italy) Milan	Washington, D.C.
19:30	Emilio 20'; Pontius 30'; Allsopp 61'; Barklage (red card) 66'	Report	Oddo 67', 71'	Stadium: RFK Stadium; Attendance: 30,367

June 19, 2010	D.C. United (United States)	1–0	El Salvador	Washington, D.C.
19:30	Cristman 51'	Report		Stadium: RFK Stadium; Attendance: 10,240; Referee: Michael Donovan

July 24, 2010	D.C. United (United States)	4–0	(England) Portsmouth	Washington, D.C.
19:30	Allsopp 21', 31', 65'; Quaranta (red card) 54'; Hernández 56'; James (red card) 89'	Report	Mullins (red card) 54'	Stadium: RFK Stadium; Attendance: 8,891

== Recognition ==
=== MLS Rookie of the Year ===
Position	Player	Ref.
MF	(Honduras) Andy Najar	

=== MLS Player of the Week ===
Week	Player	Week's Statline
12	(United States) Chris Pontius	3G (39', 44', '79)

=== MLS All-Stars 2010 ===
Position	Player	Note
FW	(Bolivia) Jaime Moreno	Commissioner's Pick
