= Barra (disambiguation) =

Barra is an island in the Outer Hebrides, Scotland. It may also refer to:

== Places ==
- North Barra, a historic name for Sula Sgeir, Scotland, an islet
- Barra, Naples, Italy, a suburb of Naples
- Barra de Mira, Portugal, a municipality in Coimbra District
- Barra, Gambia, a city
- Barra Beach, Inhambane Province, Mozambique, a tourist beach
- Barra, Macau
  - Barra station of Macau Light Rapid Transit

=== Brazil ===
- Barra, Bahia, a municipality in Bahia
- Barra (neighborhood), a neighborhood of the city of Salvador
- Barra da Tijuca, a neighborhood of the city of Rio de Janeiro

== Organizations ==
- Barra, Inc., a financial services firm
- Isle of Barra distillery, a gin distillery

== Sport ==
- Barra brava, a name for organized supporter groups of football teams in Latin America
- Barra Futebol Clube, a Brazilian soccer club
- Barra Mansa Futebol Clube, a Brazilian soccer club

== People ==
- Barra (given name)
- Barra (surname)
- De la Barra
- De Barra Family

== Other uses ==
- Barra system, passive solar building technology
- Ford Barra engine, an engine produced by Ford Australia for its Falcon range
- French ship Barra (1794), a 74-gun Ship of the line, captured and served in the Royal Navy as HMS Donegal (1798)
- Storm Barra, a 2021–22 European windstorm

== See also ==
- Barracuda, a fish
- Barramundi, a fish
- Barra, slang term for the British town of Barrow-in-Furness, also as to reflect the local accent
- Burra (disambiguation)
- Barra Bonita (disambiguation), several places
- Barra da Lagoa, a district of the city of Florianópolis in Santa Catarina, Brazil
- Barra da Tijuca, a neighborhood of the city of Rio de Janeiro, Brazil
- Barra de Santo Antônio, a municipality in Alagoas, Brazil
- Barra de São Francisco, a municipality in Espírito Santo, Brazil
- Barra de São Miguel (disambiguation), multiple places
- Barra do Chapéu, a municipality in São Paulo, Brazil
- Barra do Garças, a city in Mato Grosso, Brazil
- Barra do Piraí, a city in the state of Rio de Janeiro, Brazil
- Barra do Quaraí, a town in Rio Grande do Sul, Brazil
- Barra do Ribeiro, a municipality in the state of Rio Grande do Sul, Brazil
- Barra do Turvo, a municipality in the state of São Paulo, Brazil
- Barra Mansa, a municipality in the state of Rio de Janeiro, Brazil
- Barra de Navidad, Mexico
- Gougane Barra, a settlement in County Cork, Ireland
- Barra Brui, New South Wales, Australia
- Gracie Barra, a Brazilian jiu-jitsu association
- La Barra Brava, an independent supporters' group for Major League Soccer's D.C. United and the United States
