= De Barra =

De Barra is a surname. Notable people with the surname include:

- De Barra Family
- Cormac de Barra, harpist, singer, and television presenter
- Dáibhí de Barra (1758–1851), farmer, poet, and author in the Irish language
- Declan de Barra, Irish musician, animator, and screenwriter
- Gearóid de Barra (1847–1899), blind Irish uilleann piper
- Leslie de Barra (1893–1984), Irish nationalist and republican active

== See also ==
- De la Barra
- Barra (given name)
- Barra (disambiguation)
- Barras (surname)
