= De la Barra =

De la Barra is a surname. Notable people with the surname include:

- Eduardo de la Barra, several people
- Emma de la Barra (1861–1947), Argentine writer
- Francisco León de la Barra (1863–1939), Mexican political figure and diplomat who served as the 36th President of Mexico
- Jorge Castro de la Barra, Chilean radio and television personality
- Maipina de la Barra (1834–1904), Chilean writer of travel books and advocate of women's education
- Pedro de la Barra (1912–1977), Chilean theatre director
  - Alejandro de la Barra Villarroel (died 1973), Spanish political scientist and son of the above
  - Pablo de la Barra (born 1944), Chilean-Venezuelan film director and brother of the above
- Rafael de la Barra López (1810–1894), Chilean lawyer and politician
- Rafael de la Barra Tagle, Chilean Roman Catholic prelate

== See also ==
- San Carlos de la Barra Fortress, Venezuela
- De Barra
- Barra (surname)
- Barra (given name)
- Barra (disambiguation)
- Barras (surname)
