= Burra =

Burra may refer to:

== Places ==
- Burra, South Australia, a pastoral centre and historic tourist town in the mid-north of South Australia
  - District Council of Burra (1872–1935)
  - District Council of Burra Burra (1935–1997)
  - Corporate Town of Burra (1876–1969)
  - Electoral district of The Burra (1857–1875)
  - Electoral district of Burra (1875–1902), (1938–1970)
  - Electoral district of Burra Burra {1902–1938}
- Burra, Shetland, the collective name for two of the Shetland Islands
  - West Burra
  - East Burra
- Burra, New South Wales, a locality located near Canberra, Australia
- Burra Parish (Murray County), a land administrative division, essentially identical with the above locality
- Burra Parish (Kennedy County), a land administrative division in central western New South Wales
- Burra Burra Mine (Tennessee), named after the South Australian mine

== People ==
- Burra Madhusudhan Yadav (1972), Indian politician
- Djambu "Sambo" Burra Burra (1946–2005), noted Aboriginal Australian artist living at Ngukurr, Northern Territory
- Edward Burra (1905–1976), an English painter
- John Burra (born 1956), a Tanzanian long-distance runner
- Peter Burra (1909–1937), British literary critic

== Other ==
- Burra Charter, a charter relating to conservation of Australian heritage places
- Burra, a common name of the Australian plant Eremophila fraseri
- Burra or Burra Leiteira, a common name of the neotropical plant Sapium scleratum in genus Sapium

== See also ==
=== Places including the spelling of Burra ===
- Burra Burra Mine (disambiguation)
- Burra Creek (disambiguation)

=== Similar names ===
- Burray, one of the Orkney Islands in Scotland.
- Barra (disambiguation)
- Bura (disambiguation)
