= Roberto Barra =

Roberto Barra may refer to:

- Robert Barra (born 1960), New York politician
- Roberto Muñoz Barra (born 1936), Chilean politician
