= Roberto Muñoz =

Roberto Muñoz may refer to:

- Roberto Muñoz Barra (born 1936), Chilean educator and politician
- Roberto Rodríguez (baseball), Roberto Muñoz Rodríguez, Venezuelan baseball player
- Roberto Muñoz (cyclist) (born 1955), Chilean cyclist
- Roberto Muñoz (producer)
- Roberto Muñoz Urrutia (1906–1981), Chilean politician
- Bobby Muñoz, Puerto Rican baseball player
