= Andy Najar =

Honduran football player (born 1993)

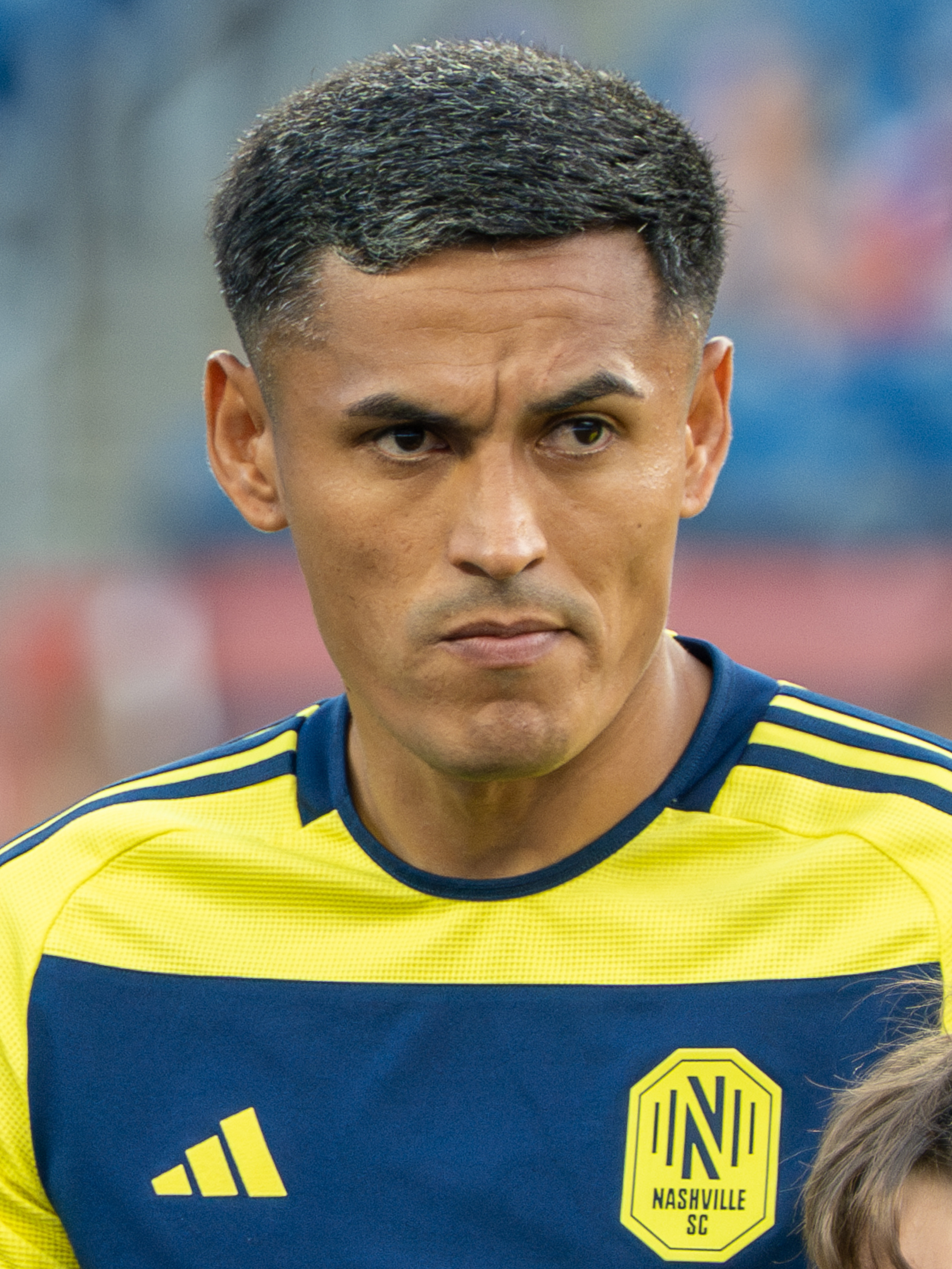
- Najar with Nashville SC in 2025

Personal information
- Full name: Andy Ariel Najar Rodríguez
- Date of birth: 16 March 1993 (age 33)
- Place of birth: Choluteca, Honduras
- Height: 5 ft 7 in (1.70 m)
- Positions: Right-back; right winger

Team information
- Current team: Nashville SC
- Number: 31

Youth career
- 2008–2010: D.C. United

Senior career*
Years	Team	Apps	(Gls)
2010–2013	D.C. United	82	(10)
2013	→ Anderlecht (loan)	0	(0)
2013–2020	Anderlecht	126	(11)
2020	Los Angeles FC	8	(0)
2021–2023	D.C. United	70	(1)
2024	Olimpia	35	(2)
2025–	Nashville SC	51	(2)

International career^{‡}
2012	Honduras Olympic	7	(0)
2011–2025	Honduras	65	(5)
- * Club domestic league appearances and goals as of 24 August 2026 ‡ National team caps and goals as of 18 November 2025

Andy Ariel Najar Rodríguez (/nəˈhɑːr/ nə-HAR; Spanish: [naˈxaɾ]; born 16 March 1993) is a Honduran professional footballer who plays as a right-back for Major League Soccer club Nashville SC.

== Early life ==
Najar moved with his family from Honduras to the United States at the age of thirteen, settling in the Washington metropolitan area. Najar attended Thomas A. Edison High School in Alexandria, Virginia and joined D.C. United's youth academy in 2008. During his time with the academy program, Najar received numerous awards and honours for his outstanding play at right back, being named to the USSF Development Academy Starting XI in 2009. He was also the leading scorer of the 2009 US Developmental Academy Finals in Los Angeles.

== Club career ==
=== D.C. United ===
Najar signed a professional Generation Adidas contract with D.C. United on 22 March 2010. Once part of MLS, the league and his team became responsible for his education. He became the second player to graduate directly from United's Academy to the first team, following goalkeeper Bill Hamid, who signed in September 2009.

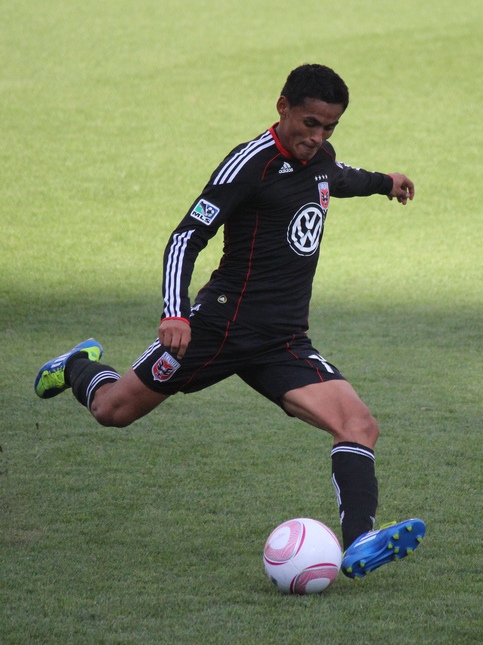
Najar prepares to strike a ball during a regular season match at Columbus Crew Stadium on 2 October 2011, that ended in a 2–1 loss for United.

Najar made his professional debut on 27 March 2010, in DC's opening game of the 2010 MLS season against the Kansas City Wizards. He scored his first professional goal on 28 April 2010 in a US Open Cup game against FC Dallas. His impressive performance throughout the 2010 season earned him the MLS Rookie of the Year, ahead of Tim Ream and Danny Mwanga.

Najar was considered by pundits such as Soccer America's Paul Gardner to be one of D.C. United's top players at the age of 17. He received interest from European clubs, according to his agent, and was expected to move there later in his career, possibly at the end of the 2010 season. However, it was announced in December 2010 that Najar had signed a multi-year contract with D.C. United.

Najar was the only player from the D.C. United's Academy to be called up for the 2012 Olympics.

=== Anderlecht ===
On 7 January 2013, Najar moved to Belgian Pro League champions Anderlecht on a one-month loan. On 30 January 2013, Anderlecht finalised the full transfer of Najar. The reported transfer fee was $3 million. He made his debut against Cercle Brugge on 2 August 2013 as a substitute in the 79th minute. On 22 October 2014, Najar opened the scoring for Anderlecht in the second half of their Champions League match against Arsenal but two late goals for the English side resulted in a 2−1 defeat for the Belgian champions.

After a summer 2019 injury, Najar did not play for Anderlecht for more than a year.

=== Los Angeles FC ===
In February 2020, Najar trained with LAFC during their preseason. On 17 June 2020, Najar returned to Major League Soccer, signing with Los Angeles FC, who earlier in the year had traded $350,000 in General Allocation Money to Nashville SC in exchange for the first selection spot in the league's Allocation Ranking. Following the 2020 season, LAFC declined their contract option on Najar.

=== Return to D.C. United ===
After being released by LAFC, Najar returned to former club D.C. United for a six-week trial period. The Black-and-Red signed him to a one-year deal with an option for two more years. On 17 April 2021, Najar came on in the 88th minute in the 2–1 win over New York City FC. Najar scored his first MLS goal since his return on 8 August in a 2–1 win over CF Montréal.

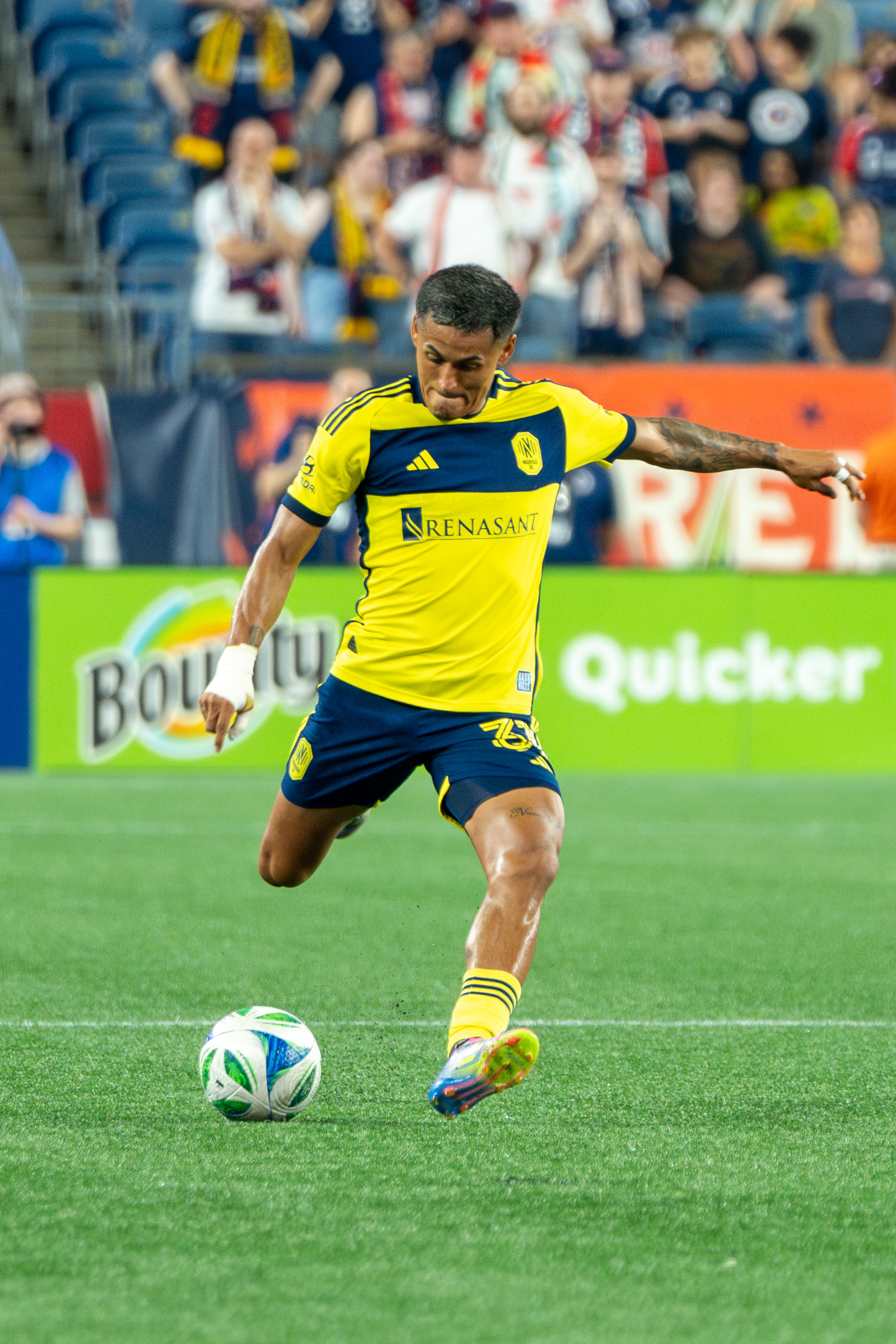
Andy Najar with Nashville SC in 2025

The club exercised Najar's options thus keeping him at the club for 2 more years. He was instrumental in then head coach Hernan Losada and Wayne Rooney's defenses, sometimes playing as a right wingback and sometimes as a center back alongside Fred Brilliant, Steve Birnbaum, Hines-Ike and Donovan Pines. His dribbling skills and positive carries often opened up scoring opportunities for United. Many fans were accepting of the decision to release him due to injuries and the want of a rebuild, but he will always be remembered as a legend for the black and red at both RFK and Buzzard Point.

=== Olimpia ===
In January 2024, Najar joined Liga Nacional de Honduras club Olimpia on a one-year deal.

=== Nashville SC ===
On 16 January 2025, Najar returned to Major League Soccer, joining Nashville SC on a one-year deal.

== International career ==
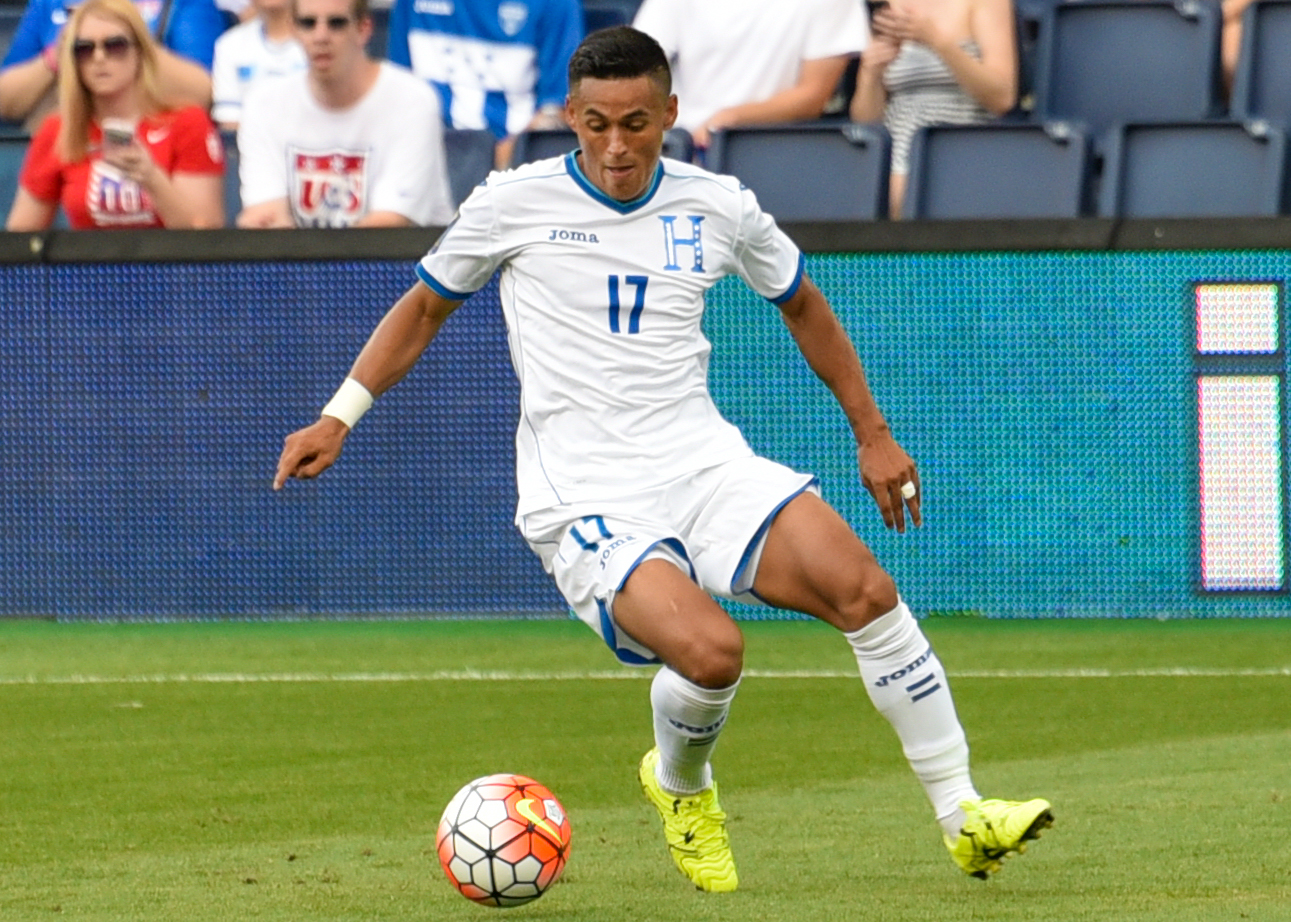
Najar with Honduras in 2015

On 6 April 2011, Najar formally announced that he would play for the Honduras national team, choosing his birth nation over the United States, from which he had yet to receive citizenship. He made his first appearance for Honduras on 3 September 2011 against Colombia, entering in the 67th minute.

Najar was called up to the Honduras U23 national team in the 2012 Olympics.

On 21 July 2013, Najar scored his first international goal for Honduras in the knockout stages of the 2013 CONCACAF Gold Cup vs Costa Rica in a 1–0 victory that advanced Honduras to the semi-finals.

In June 2025, Najar announced that he would retire from the national team following the 2026 FIFA World Cup qualifiers, or potentially after the 2026 FIFA World Cup.

On 19 November 2025, Najar retired from the national team after Honduras drew with Costa Rica and failed to qualify for the FIFA World Cup.

== Career statistics ==
=== Club ===
As of 17 April 2025

Appearances and goals by club, season and competition
Club	Season	League			Cup		Continental (Note: Includes appearances in UEFA Champions League, UEFA Europa League and CONCACAF Central American Cup.)		Other (Note: Appearances in league playoffs)		Total	
Club	Season	Division	Apps	Goals	Apps	Goals	Apps	Goals	Apps	Goals	Apps	Goals
D.C. United	2010	MLS	26	5	2	0	—		0	0	28	5
D.C. United	2011	MLS	31	5	0	0	—		0	0	31	5
D.C. United	2012	MLS	25	0	2	0	—		1	0	28	0
D.C. United	Total		82	10	4	0	0	0	1	0	87	10
Anderlecht	2013–14	Belgian Pro League	15	2	1	0	1	0	10	1	27	3
Anderlecht	2014–15	Belgian Pro League	26	2	6	1	7	1	9	4	48	8
Anderlecht	2015–16	Belgian Pro League	24	2	2	0	9	1	3	0	38	3
Anderlecht	2016–17	Belgian Pro League	9	0	1	0	5	0	—		15	0
Anderlecht	2017–18	Belgian Pro League	1	0	0	0	1	0	4	0	6	0
Anderlecht	2018–19	Belgian Pro League	18	0	1	0	4	0	0	0	23	0
Anderlecht	2019–20	Belgian Pro League	0	0	0	0	0	0	0	0	0	0
Anderlecht	Total		93	6	11	1	27	2	26	5	157	14
Los Angeles FC	2020	MLS	8	0	—		—		—		8	0
D.C. United	2021	MLS	26	1	—		—		—		26	1
D.C. United	2022	MLS	23	0	0	0	—		—		23	0
D.C. United	2023	MLS	21	0	1	0	—		—		22	0
D.C. United	Total		70	1	0	0	0	0	0	0	71	1
Olimpia	2023–24	Honduran Liga Nacional	18	1	—		—		—		18	1
Olimpia	2024–25	Honduran Liga Nacional	17	1	—		4	0	—		21	1
Olimpia			35	2	0	0	4	0	0	0	39	2
Nashville	2025	MLS	7	1	0	0	—		—		7	1
Career total			308	19	16	1	31	2	27	5	382	27

=== International ===
As of match played 18 November 2025

Appearances and goals by national team and year
National team	Year	Apps	Goals
Honduras	2011	2	0
Honduras	2012	1	0
Honduras	2013	12	1
Honduras	2014	7	0
Honduras	2015	9	3
Honduras	2016	2	0
Honduras	2017	2	0
Honduras	2019	1	0
Honduras	2021	5	0
Honduras	2022	1	0
Honduras	2023	4	0
Honduras	2024	9	1
Honduras	2025	10	0
Total		65	5

Scores and results list Honduras' goal tally first, score column indicates score after each Najar goal.

List of international goals scored by Andy Najar
No.	Date	Venue	Opponent	Score	Result	Competition	Ref.
1	21 July 2013	M&T Bank Stadium, Baltimore, United States	Costa Rica	1–0	1–0	2013 CONCACAF Gold Cup	
2	29 March 2015	Estadio Olímpico Metropolitano, San Pedro Sula, Honduras	French Guiana	1–0	3–0	2015 CONCACAF Gold Cup qualification	
3	29 March 2015	Estadio Olímpico Metropolitano, San Pedro Sula, Honduras	French Guiana	2–0	3–0	2015 CONCACAF Gold Cup qualification	
4	10 July 2015	Gillette Stadium, Foxborough, United States	Panama	1–1	1–1	2015 CONCACAF Gold Cup	
5	9 June 2024	Bermuda National Stadium, Devonshire Parish, Bermuda	Bermuda	5–1	6–1	2026 FIFA World Cup qualification	

== Honours ==
Anderlecht

- Belgian Pro League: 2012–13, 2013–14, 2016–17
- Belgian Super Cup: 2013, 2014

Nashville SC

- U.S. Open Cup: 2025

Individual

- MLS Rookie of the Year: 2010
- RSC Anderlecht Player of the Season: 2015–16, 2016–17
- MLS All-Star: 2025, 2026
