= Barra Ó Donnabháin =

Irish-American writer and Irish language promotor

Barra Ó Donnabháin (1941–2003) was a columnist with the New York Irish Echo newspaper. His weekly article in Irish entitled Macalla spoke of the Irish language and its people in Ireland and the United States. A selection of his articles were edited and translated by Hilary Mhic Suibhne and Eibhlín Zurell in a volume entitled Súil Siar: Cnuasach Aistí le Barra Ó Donnabháin (2008). He also wrote for Treoir, the magazine of Comhaltas Ceoltóirí Éireann, as well as the newspapers Foinse and Saol. He would read out his Irish language column from the Irish Echo on the weekly radio program Míle Fáilte on WFUV. He also taught Irish at the weekends, organized by Daltaí na Gaeilge.

Born in West Cork, Ireland, Barra Ó Donnabháin immigrated to the United States in 1963, where he worked as a software engineer.

== Barra Ó Donnabháin Commemorative Lectures ==
In 2006, the Glucksman Ireland House of New York University established the Annual Barra Ó Donnabháin Lecture in honour of his memory and contribution to the Irish language community. The inaugural lecture in 2006 was given by Prof. Tomás Ó hÍde. A sample of subsequent speakers in the years that followed have included Éamon Ó Cuív, T.D., Padraic Ó Ciardha, Nuala Ní Dhomhnaill, Prof. Alan Titley, Dr. Louis de Paor, Prof. Brian Ó Conchubhair, and Prof. Breandán Mac Suibhne.
