= Éder Mauro =

Brazilian politician

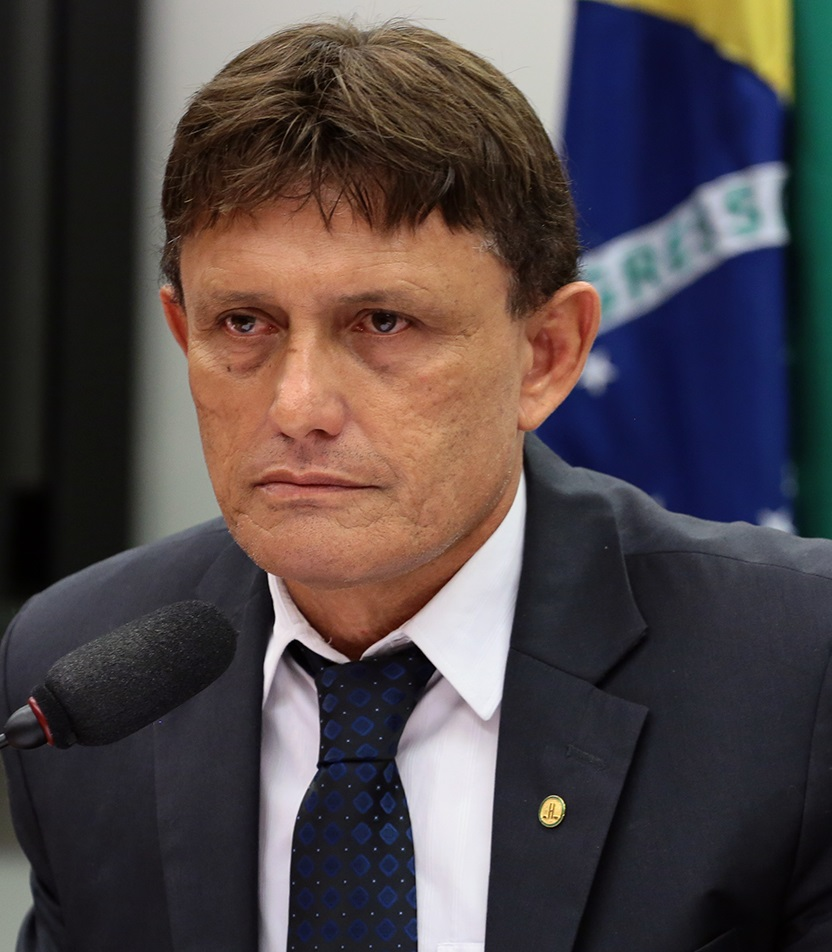
- Mauro in February 2017

Member of the Chamber of Deputies
- Incumbent
- Assumed office 1 February 2015
- Constituency: Pará

Personal details
- Born: Éder Mauro Cardoso Barra; 14 December 1960 (age 65) Belém, Pará, Brazil
- Party: PL (since 2022)
- Other political affiliations: PFL (1988–2001); PTB (2001–2013); PSD (2013–2022)
- Children: Rogério Barra
- Relatives: Tati Barra (daughter-in-law)
- Education: Federal University of Pará (LL.B.)
- Awards: Peacemaker Medal (Note: Portuguese: Medalha do Pacificador)

Éder Mauro Cardoso Barra (born 14 December 1960), better known as Delegado Éder Mauro or simply Éder Mauro, is a Brazilian politician and police chief. He has spent his political career representing Pará, having served as federal deputy representative since 2015.

== Personal life ==
Mauro is the son of Maria Trindade Martins Cardoso and Vivaldo de Jesus Barra. At the age of seventeen, Mauro took law courses at the Federal University of Pará and entered the police force shortly after graduating from university at the age of twenty-two, where he eventually became chief of the civil police for the state of Pará.

== Political career ==
A member of the parliamentary front known as "Bancada da bala", Mauro is well known in the Brazilian Chamber of Deputies for advocating loosing of gun laws and advocating the right to bear arms. The deputy is also part of the Evangelical Caucus of the National Congress and is part of the allied base of the former president Jair Bolsonaro, however during the 2018 state elections in the state of Pará Mauro defended the PSD's position of integrating the support base of the then candidate Helder Barbalho, affiliated to the opposing Brazilian Democratic Movement. As a former police officer, Mauro is well known for his strong stance on crime and punishing criminals.

Mauro ran for mayor of his hometown of Belém under the banner of the PSD party in 2016, but finished third with 128,549 votes (16.53% of the ballot) behind Zenaldo Coutinho and Edmilson Rodrigues.

Mauro voted in favor of the impeachment motion of then-president Dilma Rousseff. Braga voted in favor of the 2017 Brazilian labor reform, and would vote in against opening a corruption investigation into Rousseff's successor Michel Temer.

== Controversies ==
In September 2015 the Pará State Court of Justice referred to the Supreme Federal Court a lawsuit against Mauro claiming that he deliberately omitted reporting instances of extortion and torture allegedly committed by police officers under his leadership as chief of the civil police of Pará. The case was dismissed for lack of evidence in 2016 when the Second Panel of the Supreme Court acquitted him unanimously.

On 1 May 2019 Mauro had his official profile removed by Facebook due to publishing content considered to be promoting violence and that violated the website's guidelines. On the 26 of the same month Mauro was accused of physically assaulting Bruna Lorrane, a transexual woman lawyer and public servant. According to her Mauro pushed and punched her, causing her to receive multiple bruises on her body. Mauro denied the allegations and claimed that Lorrane's accusations were nothing more than "fake news".

In July 2019 Mauro was accused of promoting homophobia by publishing the name and information of an LGBT rights activist and university student on his Facebook page. The student later said that he had received multiple hateful messages and content after Mauro had released his information.

In February 2020 after deputy Glauber Braga got in an argument with justice minister and judge Sergio Moro, Braga called Moro a "militant henchman" who was defending Flávio Bolsonaro from corruption allegations while Moro claimed Braga was unqualified and that the PSOL party was the one protecting criminals. Mauro then jumped in and insulted Braga's mother before the chairman, Marcelo Ramos, decided to call off the hearing.
