= Barra (given name) =

Barra is a unisex given name. Notable people with the surname include:

- Barra bint Samawal, a figure in the life of Muhammad
- Barra Grant, American actress, screenwriter, film director, and playwright
- Barra McGrory (born 1959), Northern Ireland solicitor and barrister
- Barra Njie (born 2001), Swedish basketballer
- Barra Ó Donnabháin (1941–2003), columnist with the New York Irish Echo newspaper
- Barra Sugianto (born 1992), Indonesian former professional basketball player

== See also ==
- De la Barra
- Barra (surname)
- Barra (disambiguation)
