= Barra Bonita =

Barra Bonita may refer to the following places in Brazil:

- Barra Bonita, Santa Catarina
- Barra Bonita, São Paulo
