= Ricardo Navarrete =

Chilean politician (born 1949)

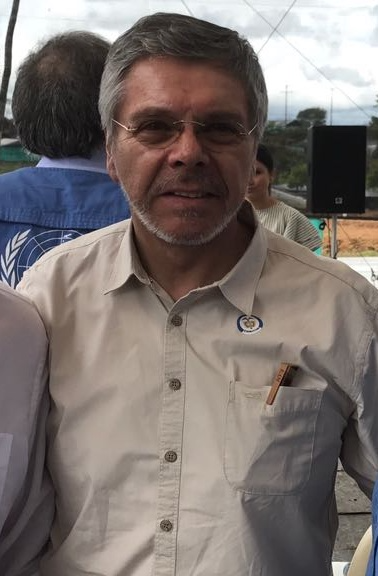

Ambassador of Chile to Colombia
- In office 16 October 2014 – 30 October 2018
- Appointed by: Michelle Bachelet
- Preceded by: Gustavo Ayares Ossandón
- Succeeded by: Ricardo Hernández Menéndez

President of the Radical Social Democratic Party
- In office 15 March 2014 – 16 May 2014
- Preceded by: José Antonio Gómez Urrutia
- Succeeded by: Iván Mesías Lehu

Undersecretary of the Policía de Investigaciones de Chile
- In office 11 March 2006 – 11 March 2010
- Appointed by: Michelle Bachelet
- Preceded by: Lincoyán Zepeda
- Succeeded by: Mario Desbordes

Member of the Senate of Chile
- In office 11 March 1990 – 11 March 1994
- Preceded by: Office re-established
- Succeeded by: Roberto Muñoz Barra
- Constituency: Araucanía Region

Personal details
- Born: 14 November 1949 (age 76) Mulchén, Chile
- Party: Radical Party; Radical Social Democrat Party
- Spouse: Mónica Tricalloti
- Children: Three
- Education: Universidad Técnica del Estado (No degree); Complutense University of Madrid
- Occupation: Politician
- Profession: Engineer

Ricardo Osvaldo Navarrete Asenjo (born 14 November 1949) is a Chilean former parliamentary and ambassador.

== Biography ==
=== Family and youth ===
He was born in Mulchén on 14 November 1949. He is the son of José Navarrete Zambrano and Oriana Betanzo Moraga. He married Mónica Tricallotis and is the father of three children.

=== Education and professional career ===
In 1962, he entered the Instituto Comercial of Angol and later the Higher Institute of Commerce of Temuco, where he studied to become a Public Accountant. He subsequently enrolled at the Technical University of State (UTE), where he obtained the degree of business administrator.

In the academic field, he has worked as a professor of Introduction to Economics and International Trade at DUOC Foundation (Pontifical Catholic University of Chile); of Microeconomics and Macroeconomics at the School of Political Sciences of the Central University of Chile (Santiago campus); as a lecturer in Economics at Universidad La República; and at the School of Public Administration and Political Science of the University of Chile.

== Political career ==
He began his political activities after being elected president of Commerce Students in southern Chile. Between 1967 and 1969, he served as national vice-president of the Federation of Commerce Students of Chile. He was later elected as a member of the Central Reform Council and the Governing Council of the UTE.

Between 1969 and 1971, he served as a national leader of the Radical Party Youth of Chile (JR), and until 1973, he was national vice-president of the organization. Following the military coup of 11 September 1973, he went into exile.

During his exile, he acted as a representative of the Radical Party of Chile in several countries, participating in Committees of Solidarity with Chile. At the same time, he continued his professional training. In 1979, he traveled to Spain to study at the School of Business Studies and the Faculty of Economic and Business Sciences of the Complutense University of Madrid, where he obtained qualifications as General Accountant, Economist, and a diploma in Business Sciences.

In 1984, he returned to Chile and served as Secretary General of the Radical Party of Chile, being re-elected to that position until 1988.

Following the victory of the “No” option in the 1988 plebiscite, he ran for the Senate of Chile in the 1989 parliamentary elections, representing the Radical Party for the 14th Senatorial District, Araucanía North Region, for the 1990–1994 term, within the Concertación coalition. He was elected with the highest vote share, obtaining 39,486 votes (28.83% of valid votes). In 1993, he ran for re-election but was not elected, being surpassed by his list partner Roberto Muñoz Barra.

On 11 May 1994, President Eduardo Frei Ruiz-Tagle appointed him as a member of the Advisory Council for Sports and Recreation.

In the 2005 parliamentary elections, he ran for the Chamber of Deputies of Chile representing the Radical Social Democratic Party for District No. 48 in the Araucanía Region but was not elected.

Between 2006 and 2010, he served as Undersecretary of Investigations under the first government of President Michelle Bachelet. In this role, he acted as a direct advisor to the Minister of Defense on matters related to the Investigations Police of Chile.

On 10 March 2014, he assumed the presidency of the Radical Social Democratic Party, replacing José Antonio Gómez, who had been appointed Minister of Justice during the second presidency of Michelle Bachelet.

On 16 May 2014, the Ministry of Foreign Affairs of Chile announced his appointment by President Bachelet as Ambassador Extraordinary and Plenipotentiary of Chile to Colombia. He remained in that position until 31 March 2018.
