= Burra Creek =

Burra Creek may refer to:

== Places ==
- Burra Creek, New South Wales, a locality north-west of Gundagai

== Watercourses ==
- Burra Creek (Gundagai), New South Wales
- Burra Creek (Palerang), New South Wales
- Burra Creek (South Australia)
