= Rogério Barra =

Brazilian politician (born 1984)

Secretary of Justice and Human Rights of Pará
- In office 1 January 2019 – 22 May 2020
- Governor: Helder Barbalho

Personal details
- Born: 10 January 1984 (age 42)
- Party: Liberal Party (since 2022)
- Spouse: Tati Barra
- Parent: Éder Mauro (father)

Hugo Rogério Sarmanho Barra (born 10 January 1984) is a Brazilian politician serving as a member of the Legislative Assembly of Pará since 2023. From 2019 to 2020, he served as secretary of justice and human rights of Pará. He is the son of Éder Mauro.
