= Jordan Graye =

American soccer player (born 1987)

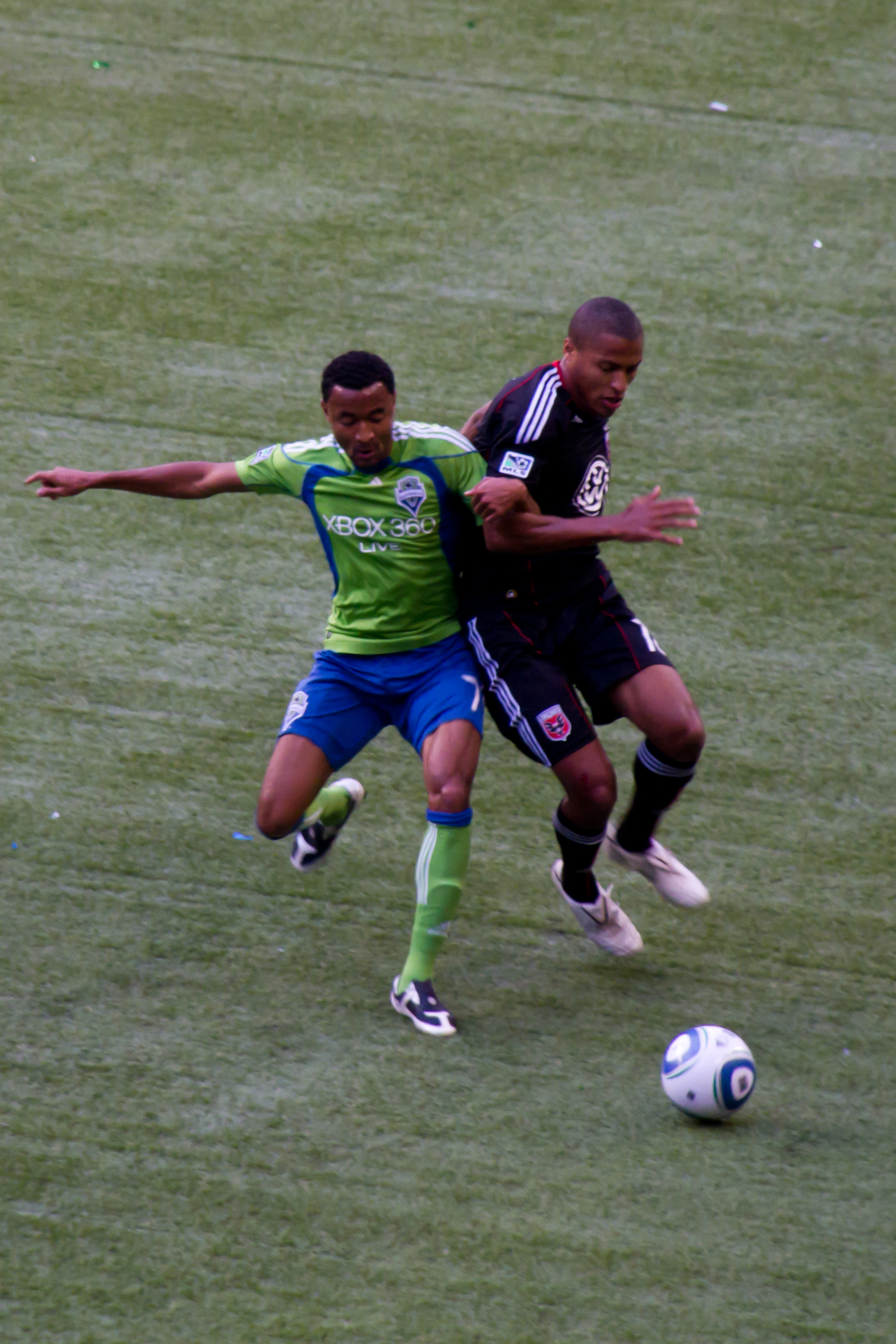

Personal information
- Full name: Jordan Cameron Graye
- Date of birth: June 15, 1987 (age 39)
- Place of birth: Washington, D.C., United States
- Height: 1.88 m (6 ft 2 in)
- Position: Defender

Youth career
- 2001–2004: D.C. United
- 2003: IMG Soccer Academy
- 2005–2009: North Carolina Tar Heels

Senior career*
Years	Team	Apps	(Gls)
2008	Cary RailHawks U23's	9	(0)
2010	D.C. United	24	(0)
2011	Houston Dynamo	0	(0)
2012–2014	Carolina RailHawks	39	(1)
2015	Fort Lauderdale Strikers	15	(0)

International career^{‡}
2003	United States U17	3	(0)
- * Club domestic league appearances and goals as of September 24, 2014 ‡ National team caps and goals as of September 15, 2012

Jordan Cameron Graye (born June 15, 1987) is an American former professional soccer player.

== Career ==
=== College ===
Born in Washington, D.C., Graye attended DeMatha Catholic High School, played club soccer for Reston FC, and played for the D.C. United Academy's U-14, U-15, U-16 and U-20 teams, and helped the U-14 squad win the Super Y-League National Title in 2001, qualifying for the national championships on three total occasions. He subsequently played five years of college soccer at the University of North Carolina at Chapel Hill, redshirting his second year in 2006.

During his college years Graye also played for the Cary RailHawks U23's in the USL Premier Development League.

=== Professional ===
Graye was drafted in the fourth round (55th overall) of the 2010 MLS SuperDraft by D.C. United. He made his professional debut on April 28, 2010, in a US Open Cup game against FC Dallas, and made his MLS debut a couple of days later on May 1 in a game against the New York Red Bulls.

On November 24, 2010, Graye was selected by expansion side Portland Timbers in the 2010 MLS Expansion Draft. Portland subsequently traded Graye to Houston Dynamo on December 13, 2010,

On June 29, 2011, the Dynamo announced that Graye had been waived.

On March 4, 2012, Graye appeared as a trialist for Carolina RailHawks, seeing action in the second half of a preseason friendly against Vancouver Whitecaps.

On September 14, 2012, it was announced that Graye had signed with the Carolina RailHawks for the remainder of the NASL season and playoffs. Graye appeared in two regular season and one playoff game for the Railhawks.

=== International ===
Graye has also been with the U.S. National Team at the U-16 and U-17 levels. He spent 2003 at the U.S. U-17 National Team Residency Program and was a member of the U-16 side in 2002.
