= Barra de São Miguel =

Barra de São Miguel (São Miguel being Portuguese for Saint Michael) may refer to:

- Barra de São Miguel, Alagoas, a municipality of Alagoas, Brazil
- Barra de São Miguel, Paraíba, a municipality of Paraíba, Brazil
