= Burra Creek (Palerang) =

Burra
- Location of the Burra Creek mouth in New South Wales

Location
- Country: Australia
- State: New South Wales
- Region: South Eastern Highlands (IBRA), Southern Tablelands, Monaro
- LGA: Queanbeyan-Palerang
- Town: Burra

Physical characteristics
- Source: Great Dividing Range
  - location: northeast of Michelago
  - coordinates: 35°35′53″S 149°13′38″E
  - elevation: 813 m (2,667 ft)
- Mouth: confluence with Queanbeyan River
  - location: near London Bridge
  - coordinates: 35°30′0″S 149°15′53″E
  - elevation: 248 m (814 ft)
- Length: 16 km (9.9 mi)

Basin features
- River system: Murrumbidgee catchment, Murray–Darling basin

The Burra Creek, a mostly–perennial river that is part of the Murrumbidgee catchment within the Murray–Darling basin, is located in the Monaro and Southern Tablelands regions of New South Wales, Australia.

== Course and features ==
The Burra Creek (technically a river) rises below Keewong Hill, northeast of Michelago, part of the Great Dividing Range, and flows generally northeast before reaching its confluence with the Queanbeyan River near the locality of London Bridge. The Queanbeyan River is a tributary of the Murrumbidgee River. The Burra Creek descends 144 metres (472 ft) over its 16-kilometre (9.9 mi) course.

== See also ==
- List of rivers of New South Wales (A–K)
- Rivers of New South Wales
