= Maipina de la Barra =

Chilean writer of travel books

- Born: 15 April 1834; Paris, France
- Died: 2 September 1904 (aged 70); Buenos Aires, Argentina
- Spouse: José Ignacio Cobo
- Relatives: José Miguel de la Barra (father)
- Writing career
- Genre: Travel literature
- Notable work: Mis impresiones y mis vicisitudes (1878)

Maipina Copacabana de la Barra (15 April 1834 – 2 September 1904) was a Chilean writer of travel books and advocate of women's education. After her husband's early death, she travelled across parts of Europe and South America with her daughter Eva. Having settled permanently in Buenos Aires, she published a memoir of her travels entitled Mis impresiones y mis vicisitudes (1878). The book discussed the state of women's education in the societies she had visited and was the first travel journal to be published by a Chilean woman.

== Life and travels ==
Maipina de la Barra was born in April 1834 in Paris as the daughter of the Chilean politician José Miguel de la Barra and his French wife Athénaïs Pereira de Lira. Her unusual given name was chosen in remembrance of the Battle of Maipú (1818), a confrontation between the newly independent government of Chile and the Spanish Empire in which her father had fought. Little is known about her education. In the late 1830s, the family relocated to Chile, where she married José Ignacio Cobo in 1851. They had four children, of whom only one, Eva Filomena, survived infancy.

After her husband's death in 1873, de la Barra and her daughter Eva Filomena travelled to France and Italy. The voyage had been intended as an educational journey for her daughter. In a similar project, they crossed the Andes Mountains and eventually settled in Buenos Aires where she worked as a piano teacher. From this point onwards, she began to participate in debates about women's education and their role in society. Though she lived in modest economic circumstances, she was able to travel to Spain in 1887. She died in Buenos Aires, aged 70 in September 1904.

== Mis impresiones y mis vicisitudes ==
In 1878, de la Barra published a memoir of her travels across Europe and South America. Dedicated to the women of Argentina, the book (Mis impresiones y mis vicisitudes) presents her observations on the societies she had experienced during her travels. Its central concern is the education of women and the role of mothers within it, which de la Barra discusses with a view to both South America and Europe. Her book was the first travel journal to be published by a Chilean woman.

== Bibliography ==
- Ulloa Inostroza, Carla (2014). "Las memorias de viaje de Maipina de la Barra (1878). Mujer y civilización" (PDF). Sociocriticism. 29: 347–73.
