= Mubarkah Bent al-Barra =

Mauritanian author and poet (born 1956)

- باته بنت البراء
- Born: 1956 al-Mazarzara
- Education: Higher Teachers’ School (MA) (1983); Muhammad V University (1987)
- Writing career
- Language: Arabic
- Genres: Poetry, non-fiction, short stories
- Notable works: Taranim li-watan wahid; al-Mar’a ﬁ-l-mujtama‘ alMuritani

Mubarkah Bent al-Barra (also known as Bat Bint al-Bura.’; (Note: Some sources also refer to her as at Bint al-Bura', Mubaraka bint al-Bura, Batah Bint Al-Baraa, or Mubaraka Mint Al-Baraa.) born 1956) is a Mauritanian poet and author.

== Biography ==
She was born and raised in al-Mazarzara, Ataklalat. al-Bura' has a Masters from Higher Teachers' School and advanced degree from Muhammad V University. Her poetry and writing focuses on themes of Mauritanian culture, independence and history, and feminism.

She has written one poetry collection, Taranim li-watan wahid (al-Wataniya Press, 1991); one novel, al-‘Ubur ila-l-jisr; one short story anthology, al-Azaﬁr al-hamra’; and two non-fiction books, al-Bina’ al-masrahi ‘ind Tawﬁq al-Hakim and al-Mar’a ﬁ-l-mujtama‘ alMuritani.

Taranim li-watan wahid was critically acclaimed and became well known in Mauritania. Her poetry has been studied and analyzed by scholars since, including Yansara bint Muhammad Mahmoud and Muhammad al-Hafiz ibn Muhammad.

== Awards and honours ==
She was awarded the Mauritanian Ministry of Culture Award for Best Poem in 1988, and the Alternative Song Festival Best Poem Award in 1989.

== Work ==
Al-Barra has extensively researched the oral poetry of Mauritania; more specifically, she has studied the tibra, a form of love poem whose recitation is restricted to all-female gatherings. Some of these she has translated into French. Her collection Taranimli-Watanin Wahid (Songs for a Country for All) was published in 1992, and Al-Shi'r al-Muritani al-Hadith, min 1970 ila 1995 (Modern Mauritanian Poetry, 1970–1995) was published in 1998. Some of her poetry has been anthologised in English. She also published a children's book, Hikayat Jaddati (My Grandmother's Tales), in 1997, and was co-editor of a volume of folktales as well. Al-Barra is prominent in Mauritanian cultural life, and has frequently attended literary festivals elsewhere in the Arab world.
