= Tati Barra =

Brazilian politician (born 1989)

- Barra in 2024

Member of the Legislative Assembly of Pará
- Incumbent
- Assumed office 1 February 2027

Personal details
- Born: 27 September 1989 (age 37)
- Party: Liberal Party (since 2024)
- Spouse: Rogério Barra
- Relatives: Éder Mauro (father-in-law)

Tatiane Calabria Coelho (born 27 September 1989), better known as Tati Barra, is a Brazilian politician who was elected member of the Legislative Assembly of Pará in 2026. She is married to Rogério Barra and the daughter-in-law of Éder Mauro.
