= Daltaí na Gaeilge =

Organization

- Daltaí na Gaeilge's fish logo, a design featuring Celtic knotwork and inspired by Irish illuminated manuscripts such as the Book of Kells.
- Founder: Ethel Brogan
- Type: Nonprofit
- Legal status: Public Charity
- Region served: New Jersey, New York & Pennsylvania
- Official language: Irish
- Website: daltai.com

Daltaí na Gaeilge (Irish pronunciation: [ˈd̪ˠal̪ˠt̪ˠiː n̪ˠə ˈɡeːlʲɟə]; meaning "Students of Irish"; DnaG) is an 501(c)(3) tax-exempt nonprofit organization that operates Irish language immersion programs in the American states of New York, New Jersey and Pennsylvania. It also serves as a resource for Irish language students from across the English-speaking world to connect with qualified instructors.

== History ==
The organization was founded by Ethel Brogan, a native of Armagh, Northern Ireland who learned Irish by spending one month each summer in the Donegal Gaeltacht. She emigrated to New York City in 1946 and eventually moved to upstate New York.

In the United States, Brogan began teaching Irish classes for the benefit of interested neighbors. In March 1981, she arranged the first "Gaeltacht Weekend" in New York for students to improve their Irish language skills through total immersion.

That initial immersion weekend led to the foundation of Daltaí na Gaeilge, a nonprofit organization registered in the state of New Jersey. Today, in addition to offering Irish language classes in the NY-NJ-PA tri-state area, Daltaí na Gaeilge operates a website that provides discussion boards and many other resources for students and teachers of the Irish language.
