= Barra Bonita, Santa Catarina =

Barra Bonita
- Municipality
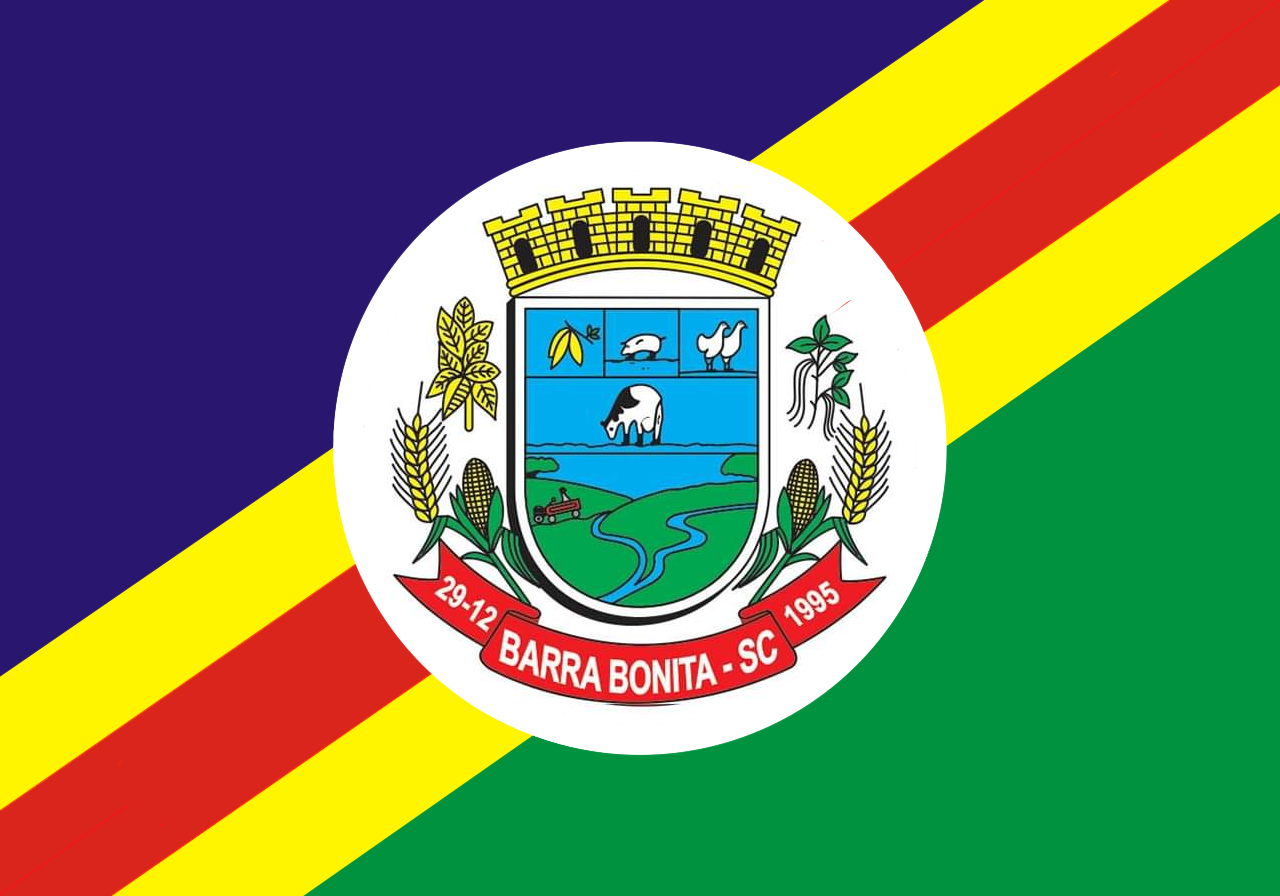
- Flag Coat of arms

- Location in Brazil
- Coordinates: 26°39′14″S 53°26′24″W
- Country: Brazil
- Region: South
- State: Santa Catarina
- Mesoregion: Oeste Catarinense
- Elevation: 1,056 ft (322 m)

Population (2020)
  - Total: 1,651
- Time zone: UTC -3

Barra Bonita is a municipality in the state of Santa Catarina in the South region of Brazil.

== See also ==
- List of municipalities in Santa Catarina
