= Burra Burra Mine =

Burra Burra Mine may refer to:

- The Burra Burra Mine — an historic (1845 – 1877) copper mine located in Burra, South Australia
- The Burra Burra Mine (Tennessee) — a copper mine located in Ducktown, Tennessee, United States, and named after the Australian mine
