= Júnior Carreiro =

Brazilian footballer (born 1991)

Junior Carreiro
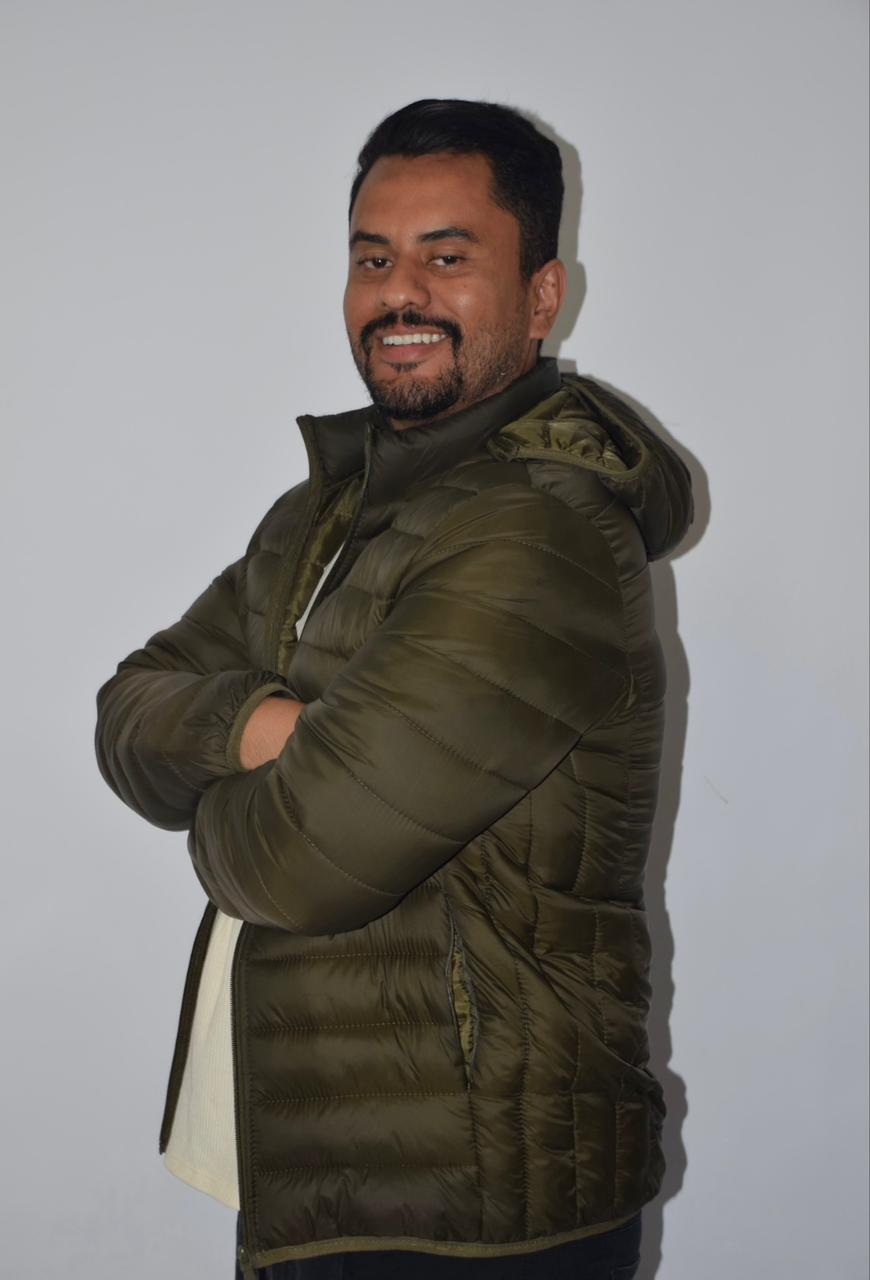

Personal information
- Full name: Ilson Amancio Carreiro Júnior
- Date of birth: 26 June 1991 (age 35)
- Place of birth: Belo Horizonte, Minas Gerais, Brazil
- Height: 1.83 m (6 ft 0 in)
- Position: Midfielder

Senior career*
Years	Team	Apps	(Gls)
2009–2010	Náutico		
2010–2011	D.C. United		
2012	Salgueiro		
- * Club domestic league appearances and goals as of 9 November 2010

Ilson Amâncio Carreiro Júnior (born 26 June 1991 in Belo Horizonte), better known as Junior Carreiro, is a Brazilian former professional footballer. He is now a football agent licensed by CBF.

== Careers ==
Carreiro's career was ended early by an injury to his left ankle.

== Net worth ==
As of April 2025, Júnior Carreiro's estimated net worth is approximately $9.42 million USD.
