= La Barra Brava =

Supporters' group for D.C. United

- Established: 1995
- Type: Supporters' group
- Team: D.C. United
- Founder: Oscar Zambrana
- Colors: Red
- Website: https://www.barra-brava.net/

La Barra Brava is an independent supporters' group for Major League Soccer's D.C. United and the United States. La Barra Brava are often called the craziest fans in MLS for their antics.

== History ==
It was founded in 1995 by Latino fans in the Washington, D.C. area, mostly Bolivian immigrants in support of original United players Marco Etcheverry and Jaime Moreno.

Since then, the group has expanded and all have been welcomed, while the group has remained closely identified with its South American roots. Members currently stand and sing in Audi Field. La Barra was founded by Oscar Zambrana and is led by Oscar and a group of "Elders".

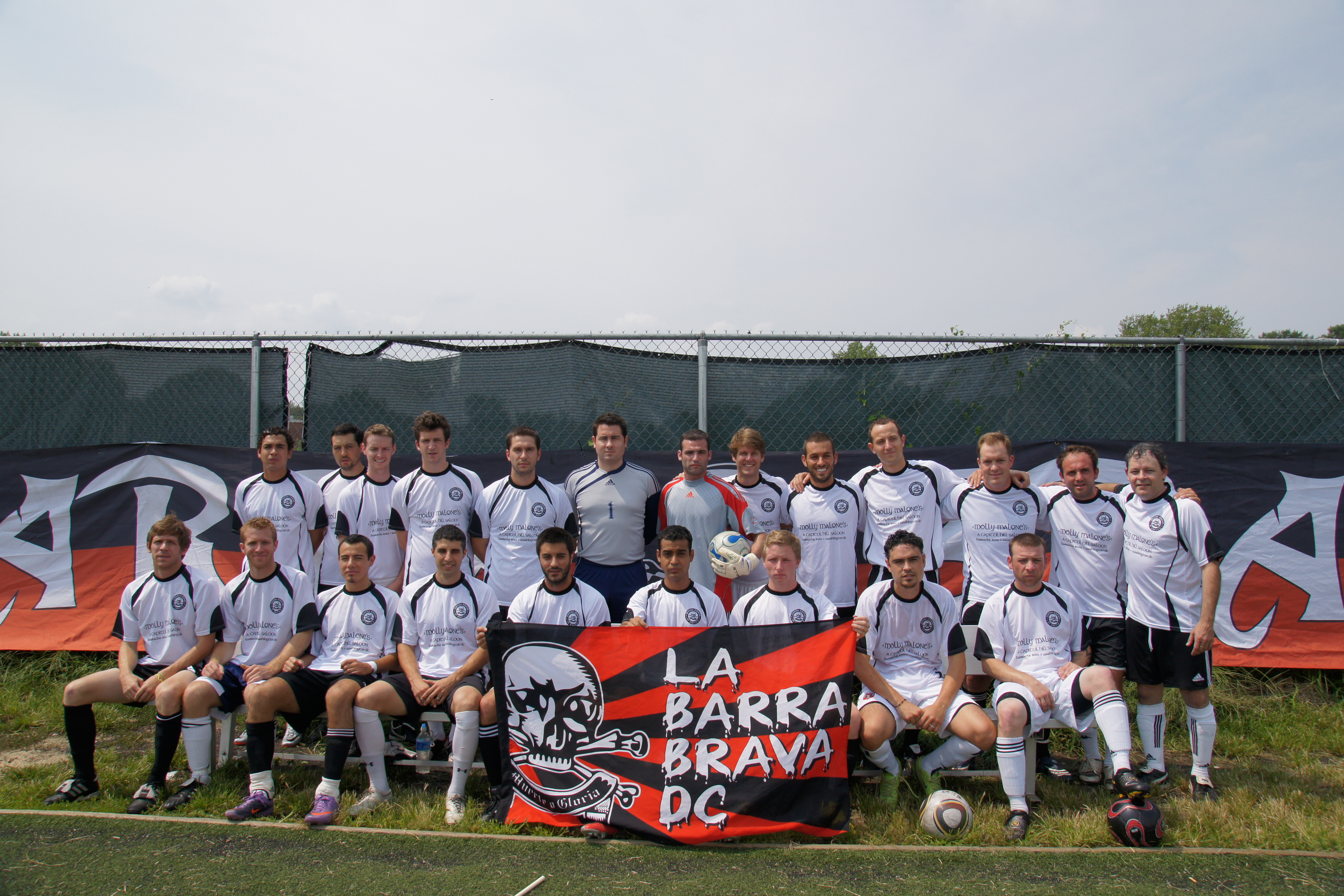
Barra Brava FC before the Fall 2010 Supporters' Charity Shield event

La Barra Brava runs several events and programs for members and all United fans throughout the year. They sponsor away-game viewing parties, road trips to away matches and popular charity raffles that have raised thousands of dollars. They also maintain relationships with fan organizations worldwide, particularly with the Nottingham Forest Supporters Southwest/M5 Branch. La Barra Brava publishes at least 3 articles on United and soccer per week on their website. The organization also oversees Barra Brava FC, which fields several teams in the competitive Washington International Soccer League.

Within MLS, the Barra is known for its drumming, including the famous "Drum Circles" at halftime and after home matches. In 2005, La Barra Brava received extensive media coverage when suspended United playmaker Christian Gomez joined the Barra at road game in NJ and played a bass drum during the second half to support his teammates.

In 2006 the Barras expanded their events beyond the MLS season attending several of the NHL's Washington Capitals home games at the Verizon Center. However, their presence at the arena was met with mixed reviews from ice hockey fans.

== Media coverage ==
Numerous references have been made by the media regarding La Barra Brava. On several occasions, when games at Audi Field are shown on national television via ESPN or ABC, announcers will mention how La Barra Brava contribute to United's impressive home record. Tony Kornheiser has also used La Barra Brava as his stereotypical example of what he thinks typical D.C. United fans are like.

== Tifo gallery ==
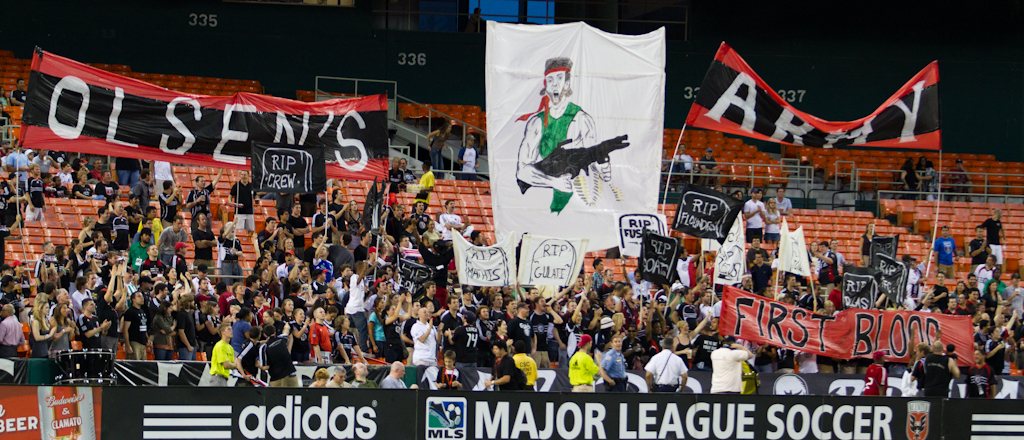
A tifo supporting head coach Ben Olsen during a match against the FC Dallas

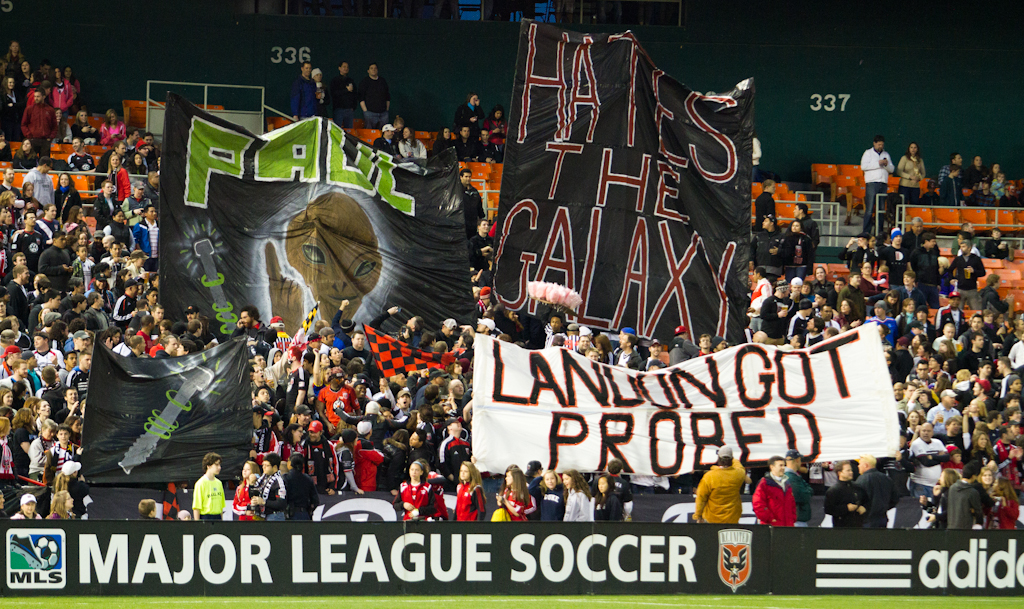
A tifo referencing the 2011 film Paul during a match against the L.A. Galaxy
