= Barras (surname) =

Barras is a surname. Notable people with the surname include:

- Alexander Barras (1914–1986), Australian cricketer
- Charlotte Barras (born 1982), English rugby union player
- Claude Barras (born 1973), Swiss director
- Gérard Barras (1937–1979), Swiss athlete
- Jacques-Melchior Saint-Laurent, Comte de Barras (1719–1793), French naval officer
- Martin Barras (born 1962), French-Canadian cycling coach
- Paul Barras (1755–1829), French politician
- Romain Barras (born 1980), French decathlete
- Sébastien Barras (1653–1703), French painter and engraver
- Sid Barras (born 1948), English cyclist
- Taylor Barras (born 1957), American politician
- Tom Barras (cyclist) (born 1978), English cyclist
- Tony Barras (born 1971), English footballer
