= Roberto Muñoz Barra =

Chilean politician (born 1936)

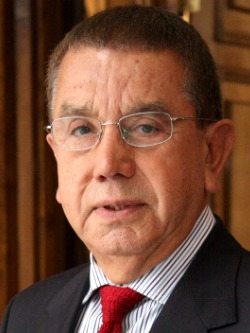

Member of the Senate
- In office 11 March 1994 – 11 March 2010
- Preceded by: Ricardo Navarrete
- Succeeded by: Jaime Quintana
- Constituency: 14th Circumscription

Member of the Chamber of Deputies
- In office 11 March 1990 – 11 March 1994
- Preceded by: District created
- Succeeded by: Miguel Hernández Saffirio
- Constituency: 49th District
- In office 15 May 1969 – 21 September 1973
- Succeeded by: 1973 coup d'état
- Constituency: 20th District

Personal details
- Born: 28 January 1936 (age 90) Lautaro, Chile
- Party: Radical Party (PR); Chilean Social Democracy Party (SDCh); Party for Democracy (PPD)
- Spouse: Gladys Cretton
- Children: Three
- Education: University of the Frontier
- Occupation: Politician
- Profession: Biologist

Roberto Muñoz Barra (born 28 January 1936) is a Chilean educator and former politician who served as a Senator.

He served as a Senator for the 14th Senatorial District (Araucanía North). Throughout his career, he was affiliated with several political movements, including the Radical Party of Chile, the Party for Democracy (PPD), and earlier left-leaning radical and social democratic groups.

== Early life and education ==
Muñoz was born on 28 January 1936 in Lautaro. He is the son of José Muñoz Elgueta and Juana Barra Flores. He is married to Gladys Crettón Delarze and has three children.

He completed his primary education at School No. 1 of Lautaro and his secondary education at the Lautaro High School in the Araucanía Region. He later entered the Normal School of Victoria, where he qualified as a state-certified teacher. Subsequently, he specialized in physical education and biology at the Regional University College of the University of Chile in Temuco.

== Professional career ==
Muñoz developed his professional career primarily in the field of education. He worked as a teacher at the Application School attached to the Normal School of Victoria, taught natural sciences at the primary level, served at the Night High School of Lautaro, worked at the Victoria Boarding School, and held responsibilities in school organization and administration within the First School Session framework.

In parallel with his teaching activities, he held leadership roles within the education sector, serving as president of the Federation of Educators, the National Association of Fiscal Employees (ANEF), the Union of Teachers of Chile, and the Technical Council for Seventh and Eighth Grades at the Application School.

== Political career ==
Muñoz began his political involvement as president of the student council at the Lautaro High School and later as president of the Southern Provincial Federation of Secondary Students. He joined the Radical Party of Chile at an early age, serving as president of its youth wing and later as party secretary. As a senior party leader, he represented Radical deputies before the party's National Executive Committee (CEN).

On 3 August 1971, he resigned from the Radical Party and joined the Independent Left Radical Movement, where he served as secretary general. He later became a member of the Radical Left Party (PIR), remaining active until 1973. That same year, he participated in the founding of the Chilean Social Democracy Party, later becoming its vice president and, in 1994, its national president.

On 18 October 1990, Muñoz resigned from the Social Democracy Party of Chile. On 31 March 1993, he joined the Party for Democracy (PPD), following a decision taken by the party's leadership. On 7 July 2009, he resigned from the PPD, ending more than two decades of party membership, and announced his independent candidacy for the Senate.

In the 2009 parliamentary elections, Muñoz was not re-elected as senator for the 14th Senatorial District (Araucanía North).
