= 2013 Colorado Rapids season =

Colorado Rapids
2013 season
- Owner: Stan Kroenke
- Coach: Oscar Pareja
- Major League Soccer: 5th in West; 8th Overall
- MLS Cup playoffs: Knockout round
- U.S. Open Cup: Third round
- Highest home attendance: 18,359 vs. New York Red Bulls (July 4)
- Lowest home attendance: 11,774 vs. Portland Timbers (March 30)
- Average home league attendance: 15,440
Home colors	Away colors

The 2013 Colorado Rapids season was the club's eighteenth season of existence, and their eighteenth season in Major League Soccer, the top tier of the American and Canadian soccer pyramids.

== Review ==
The 2013 Colorado Rapids would see massive changes made to the team. All-time leading goal scorer Conor Casey was released and Omar Cummings would be traded during the offseason, the Forward duo combining for 89 goals in the Rapids' careers. The Midfield pairing of Jeff Larentowicz and long-time Captain Pablo Mastroeni would be broken up, as well. Larentowicz was traded in the offseason and Mastroeni was traded during the summer of 2013. With the majority of the 2010 MLS Champions team gone (only 5 players remaining on the squad), the team looked considerably different. Coach Oscar Pareja wanting a squad of younger, more athletic players. Colorado brought in US National Team Forward Edson Buddle, along with several South American players who had played for their National Teams. 2013 would also see Rapids' Homegrown Player, 19-year-old Shane O'Neill, become a valuable member of the US U-20 National Team leading up to and during the 2013 U-20 World Cup in Turkey.

=== Offseason ===
The Colorado Rapids' offseason began with the release of 9 players in November. Forward Conor Casey, Midfielders Edu and Joseph Nane, Defenders Tyson Wahl, Hunter Freeman, and Luis Zapata, and Goalkeeper Ian Joyce all had their options declined. Tyrone Marshall and Scott Palguta's contracts expired and they were not re-signed. Midfielder Jamie Smith's contract also expired, however, he returned to the Rapids' preseason training camp and then was re-sign by Colorado.

The Rapids' added several players during the offseason via trade, including Forward Atiba Harris from Vancouver Whitecaps FC for a 2015–2016 International Roster Spot. Colorado also traded their 1st Round 2013 MLS Supplemental Draft pick to the LA Galaxy for US International Forward Edson Buddle. Later in December, Forward Omar Cummings was traded to the Houston Dynamo for Nathan Sturgis and allocation money. Cummings narrowly missed being reunited with fellow 2010 Cup Champion, Macoumba Kandji, who had been traded to Houston the previous year. Kandji refused a contract extension in order to play in Europe. At the 2012 MLS Re-Entry Draft, Colorado selected Eric Avila with the 6th pick of the 1st round in the 2nd stage.

In January, on the day before the 2013 MLS SuperDraft, Midfielder Jeff Larentowicz was traded to the Chicago Fire. The trade would involve an exchange of draft picks, Colorado receiving the 11th overall pick and Chicago receiving the 30th overall pick. Chicago had traded the 30th overall pick to Colorado during the 2012 MLS season for Wells Thompson. The following day, the Rapids drafted Forward Deshorn Brown (6th overall), Midfielder Dillon Powers (11th overall from Chicago), and Defender Kory Kindle (25th overall). Ecuadorian International Defender Diego Calderón and Chilean International Midfielder Kevin Harbottle were signed to International Roster Spots. Dillon Serna was signed as the Rapids' 3rd Homegrown Player in the lineup, joining US Youth International Shane O'Neill and Davy Armstrong. Colorado traded the rights to Eric Avila to Chivas USA, in exchange for the rights to Nick LaBrocca. Having originally been drafted by Colorado in 2007, LaBrocca would eventually sign with the Rapids for a second time. During the 2013 MLS Supplemental Draft, Colorado selected Brenton Griffiths with the 25th overall pick. Though he was drafted on January 22, Griffiths didn't sign with the Rapids until April 30.

On January 25, Colorado announced the signing of Cameroonian Youth International Charles Eloundou on a one-year loan from AS Fortuna de Mfou in Cameroon. Colorado had won the rights to sign Eloundou in a weighted lottery. Eloundou has yet to wear a Rapids' jersey, however, undergoing a lengthy battle with the Cameroonian side over the loan deal. The ordeal would later cost the Rapids even more. After several weeks of training with the club during the summer, US Youth International Conor Doyle tried to sign with Colorado on loan from Derby County in England. MLS decided that Doyle must enter a weighted lottery and that Colorado was ineligible due to winning the lottery rights to Eloundou. The weighted lottery rights to Doyle would be won by D.C. United.

In February, Colorado added Goalkeeper Clint Irwin on a free transfer from the Charlotte Eagles. The Rapids also added the 1st overall 2010 MLS SuperDraft pick Danny Mwanga in a trade with the Portland Timbers for a 1st round 2015 MLS SuperDraft pick.

A series of injuries started the season off on the wrong foot for the Rapids. New Forward Edson Buddle injured his knee during training with the US Men's National Team in January. The injury would cause him to miss the start of the MLS season. Starting Goalkeeper Matt Pickens, who was injured at the end of the 2012 season, would miss the start of 2013, as well. The Rapids' 2012 assists leader, Martin Rivero, broke his foot during the first preseason game of 2013 in Tucson. He would return to the lineup mid-season. 2012 leading goal scorer, Jaime Castrillón, required knee surgery and would be out until July. The Rapids had initially been excited about the return of Pablo Mastroeni, agreeing to play on more season after missing almost all of 2012 with concussion symptoms. His return was short lived, however, battling several injuries and seeing limited time before being traded to LA.

=== March ===
The 2013 MLS season got off to a bad start with a 1–0 loss away to FC Dallas. The deciding goal came early on a goalkeeping error by backup Steward Ceus. The following week's home opener was delayed 1 day due to snow. Colorado dropped the game 2–1 in their first ever loss to the Philadelphia Union. Although recently signed by Philadelphia, Conor Casey did not play for his former team due to injury. Colorado got their first point of the season on March 16, when they drew away to arch-rival Real Salt Lake. During the Rocky Mountain Rivalry matchup at Real Salt Lake, Matt Pickens suffered a broken forearm in the 3rd minute of the game. Twenty-one-year-old Clint Irwin would step into the starting Goalkeeper position in his absence. Irwin would go on to set a record for facing a Penalty Kick in each of his 1st four MLS games, allowing only 2 goals. Irwin would also tie the MLS record for allowing only 5 goals in his first 10 games. The Rapids lost the following game at LA Galaxy on a Mike McGee PK following a Drew Moor red card early in the 2nd half. Diego Calderón injured his knee after he slid into the goal post clearing a shot off the goal line. The injury would require surgery and several months to heal. The injury would allow 23-year-old Chris Klute, on loan from the Atlanta Silverbacks (NASL), to step in and solidify the back line. Klute would start 16 straight games at the Left Back Position, the first Rapids' player to do so since the start of 2010. On March 28, Colorado traded Andre Akpan to the New York Red Bulls for a conditional pick in 2015 MLS SuperDraft. Colorado finished the month with a 2–2 home draw to Portland Timbers, the draw marked the first ever points dropped at home to Portland.

=== April ===
April began with Colorado's first win of the season, 1–0 over Real Salt Lake at home with Atiba Harris scoring his first Rapids' goal. The Rapids would make it 2 straight wins the next week after defeating Chivas USA 1–0 in LA on rookie Deshorn Brown's first goal. The streak came to an end the following game as the Rapids lost to Seattle Sounders FC for a 7th consecutive time, losing 1–0 at home. Colorado finished the month 2–1–1 after a 1–1 draw away to Houston Dynamo. Once again, the Rapids missed facing one of their former stars as Omar Cummings missed the game.

=== May ===
May began with a 1–0 home win over Toronto FC with Edson Buddle collecting his first goal in a Rapids' uniform. Buddle made it 2 in a row the following week in a 2–0 win at Columbus Crew. Colorado snapped a 3-game losing streak to San Jose Earthquakes with a 1–1 draw in San Jose on May 18. Colorado rounded out the month with a 2–0 home win over Chivas USA. Colorado finished May with an unbeaten record of 3–1–0, outscoring their opponents 6–1.

=== June ===
Shane O'Neill left the Rapids during June to Participate in the 2013 U-20 World Cup in Turkey. On June 17, the Rapids traded long-time Captain Pablo Mastroeni to the LA Galaxy for a 2nd round pick in the 2014 MLS SuperDraft and an International Roster Spot through the 2014 season. Mastroeni is the Rapids all-time leader in Games and Minutes Played. Colorado continued their unbeaten streak on June 1, with a 2–2 home draw with FC Dallas. 3 straight loses would follow, 2–1 home loss to San Jose Earthquakes, 2–1 away loss to Chicago Fire, and a 3–0 defeat away to Portland Timbers. On June 29, Colorado beat Montreal 4–3 in their first ever meeting in Montreal. The game featured 2 MLS Goal of the Week nominees by Montreal and would be considered by many as a Game of the Year nominee.

=== July ===
Colorado beat New York Red Bulls 2–0 on July 4, improving their all-time record to 12–3–3 in July 4 games. They continued their 4-game Eastern Conference swing with a 0–0 draw at home to D.C. United and a 2–1 victory at home over New England Revolution. On July 20, Colorado drew at Seattle Sounders FC, taking their first ever point from CenturyLink Field. July 27 would mark Pablo Mastroeni's bittersweet return to Colorado. He received a warm reaction from the crowd, but his new club, LA Galaxy, fell 2–0. Colorado would finish the month unbeaten, going 3–2–0, while scoring 7 goals and conceding 2. The Rapids released Kevin Harbottle at the end of July. The midfielder had been battling injury problems and had played in only 4 games since he was signed in the offseason.

=== August ===
Taking a 6-game unbeaten streak (4–2–0) into August, the Rapids took back the Rocky Mountain Cup from Real Salt Lake after a 2–2 draw on August 3. The game would also feature a 62-minute lightning delay during a heavy thunderstorm. On August 6, Colorado signed Vicente Sánchez, a veteran of Mexican and German soccer, as an International Player. On August 8, Colorado signed Gabriel Torres, who was coming off a very successful 2013 CONCACAF Gold Cup, as the club's first ever Designated Player. The Rapids drew away to Chivas USA 1–1 on August 11. The draw snapped the Rapids' 4 game winning streak at Chivas, in which they had shut out Chivas in all 4 games. Vicente Sanchez made his MLS debut during the Chivas game. Sanchez and Torres would both get their 1st MLS starts against Vancouver Whitecaps FC on August 17. Colorado defeated Vancouver 2–0 in a battle of teams tied for 2nd place in the Western Conference Standings. The win would also extend the Rapids unbeaten streak to a club record-tying 9 games. The unbeaten streak would come to an end on the final day of August with a 2–1 defeat at Sporting Kansas City.

=== September ===
The Rapids began September with a 1–0 victory over the Los Angeles Galaxy, who were missing several players due to international duty. Edson Buddle scored his 98th career MLS goal against his former club. Clint Irwin tied the club record for shutouts in a single MLS season with 10. On September 14, Colorado saw Vicente Sánchez open his Rapids account in a 2–1 victory over FC Dallas. Colorado lost the next game 1–0 away to Portland Timbers.

=== October ===
Colorado began October with a 5–1 victory over Seattle Sounders FC, Colorado had only won once in 11 games against Seattle previously. The game began with Deshorn Brown scoring his first of 2 goals on the night after just 13 seconds. It was the fastest goal in Rapids history (passing Conor Casey's 16 second goal against LA in 2009) and the 2nd fastest goal in MLS history (Dwayne De Rosario scored in 11 seconds for San Jose against Dallas in 2003). The game was finished with Gabriel Torres scoring his first MLS goal in stoppage time. It was the most goals ever allowed by Seattle Sounders FC in an MLS game and most goals scored by Colorado since a 5–4 victory over New York Red Bulls in 2008. Colorado followed that great performance with a terrible showing in a 1–0 defeat away to San Jose Earthquakes, leaving San Jose with a chance to overtake Colorado for the 5th and final playoff spot in the Western Conference. Colorado rebounded with a 3–2 win over Vancouver Whitecaps FC, eliminating Vancouver from playoff contention. New Rapids Forward Gabriel Torres scored twice, including the game winner in the 77th minute. The win game Colorado its highest point total in club history and most wins and most goals scored since 1999 and 1998, respectively. Colorado finished the regular season with a 9-game unbeaten streak at home (7W, 2D). The 2013 Regular Season went out on a sour note, losing 3–0 in Vancouver behind a Camillo Sanvezzo hat trick. It meant Colorado finished the regular season losing 3 straight road games, all by shutouts. As a result, Colorado finished 5th in the Western Conference and had to travel to Seattle for the Knockout Round of the 2013 MLS Cup Playoffs. Colorado would fall to Seattle 2–0 to end their 2013 MLS Season.

== Club ==
=== Roster ===
Updated August 13, 2013.

No.	Position	Nation	Player
2	MF	USA	Nick LaBrocca
3	DF	USA	Drew Moor
5	DF	ECU	Diego Calderón
6	DF	USA	Anthony Wallace
7	FW	URU	Vicente Sánchez
8	MF	USA	Dillon Powers
9	FW	USA	Edson Buddle
10	MF	ARG	Martín Rivero (on loan from Rosario Central)
11	MF	USA	Brian Mullan
12	MF	HON	Hendry Thomas
13	FW	USA	Kamani Hill
14	MF	USA	Tony Cascio
15	DF	USA	Chris Klute
16	FW	SKN	Atiba Harris
17	MF	USA	Dillon Serna (HGP)
18	GK	USA	Matt Pickens
20	MF	SCO	Jamie Smith
21	GK	HAI	Steward Ceus
22	DF	USA	Marvell Wynne
23	MF	COL	Jaime Castrillón
24	DF	USA	Nathan Sturgis
26	FW	JAM	Deshorn Brown (GA)
27	MF	USA	Shane O'Neill (HGP)
28	MF	USA	Davy Armstrong (HGP)
29	DF	USA	Kory Kindle
30	FW	PAN	Gabriel Torres
31	GK	USA	Clint Irwin
32	DF	JAM	Brenton Griffiths
33	DF	COL	Germán Mera (on loan from Deportivo Cali)
55	FW	COD	Danny Mwanga

=== Technical Staff ===
As of March 11, 2013.

Position	Name
Technical director	Paul Bravo
Head coach	Oscar Pareja
Assistant coach	Wilmer Cabrera
Assistant coach	Paul Caffery
Assistant/Goalkeeper Coach	Dave Dir
Assistant coach	Steve Cooke
Head Athletic Trainer	Jamie Rojas

== Transfers ==
=== Transfers in ===
Date	Player	Position	Previous club	Fee/notes	Ref
December 3, 2012	(Saint Kitts and Nevis) Atiba Harris	FW	(Canada) Vancouver Whitecaps FC	Traded for 2015 and 2016 international roster slot	
December 14, 2012	(United States) Edson Buddle	FW	(United States) LA Galaxy	Traded for 1st round 2013 MLS Supplemental Draft pick and allocation money	
December 22, 2012	(United States) Nathan Sturgis	MF	(United States) Houston Dynamo	Traded along with allocation money for Omar Cummings	
January 3, 2013	(Ecuador) Diego Calderón	DF	(Ecuador) Liga de Quito	Signed as an International Player	
January 17, 2013	(Chile) Kevin Harbottle	MF	(Chile) Universidad Católica	Signed as an International Player	
January 18, 2013	(United States) Dillon Serna	MF	(United States) University of Akron	Signed as a Homegrown Player	
January 25, 2013	(United States) Nick LaBrocca	MF	(United States) Chivas USA	Traded for the rights to Eric Avila	
January 25, 2013	(Cameroon) Charles Eloundou	FW	(Cameroon) AS Fortuna de Mfou	MLS Weighted Lottery	
February 21, 2013	(United States) Clint Irwin	GK	(United States) Charlotte Eagles	Free Transfer	
February 28, 2013	(Democratic Republic of the Congo) Danny Mwanga	FW	(United States) Portland Timbers	Traded for 1st round 2015 MLS SuperDraft pick	
May 6, 2013	(Colombia) Germán Mera	DF	(Colombia) Deportivo Cali	On Loan from Deportivo Cali	
August 6, 2013	(Uruguay) Vicente Sánchez	FW	(Uruguay) Nacional	Signed as an International Player	
August 8, 2013	(Panama) Gabriel Torres	FW	(Venezuela) Zamora FC	Signed as a Designated Player	

=== Transfers out ===
Date	Player	Position	Destination club	Fee/notes	Ref
November 16, 2012	(United States) Conor Casey	FW		Option declined, later signed with Philadelphia Union	
November 16, 2012	(Brazil) Edu	MF		Option declined	
November 16, 2012	(United States) Ian Joyce	GK		Option declined	
November 16, 2012	(Cameroon) Joseph Nane	MF		Option declined	
November 16, 2012	(United States) Tyson Wahl	MF		Option declined, later signed with Columbus Crew	
November 16, 2012	(Colombia) Luis Zapata	DF		Option declined	
November 16, 2012	(United States) Hunter Freeman	DF		Option declined, later drafted by New England Revolution, eventually signed with New York Cosmos (NASL)	
November 16, 2012	(Jamaica) Tyrone Marshall	DF		Out of Contract	
November 16, 2012	(United States) Scott Palguta	DF		Out of Contract	
December 22, 2012	(Jamaica) Omar Cummings	FW	(United States) Houston Dynamo	Traded for Nathan Sturgis and allocation money	
January 16, 2013	(United States) Jeff Larentowicz	MF	(United States) Chicago Fire	Traded along with the 30th overall 2013 MLS SuperDraft pick for the 11th overall 2013 MLS SuperDraft pick and a 2013 International Roster Spot	
January 25, 2013	(United States) Eric Avila	MF	(United States) Chivas USA	Traded for the rights to Nick LaBrocca	
March 28, 2013	(United States) Andre Akpan	FW	(United States) New York Red Bulls	Traded for a conditional pick in the 2015 MLS SuperDraft	
June 17, 2013	(United States) Pablo Mastroeni	MF	(United States) L.A. Galaxy	Traded along with the rights to Baggio Husidic for an International Roster spot through the 2014 season and a second round pick in the 2014 MLS Superdraft	
July 31, 2013	(Chile) Kevin Harbottle	MF		Released	

=== Draft picks ===
Date	Player	Position	Previous club	Fee/notes	Ref
December 14, 2012	(United States) Eric Avila	MF	(United States) Toronto FC	2012 MLS Re-Entry Draft 1st Stage, 1st Round, 6th Overall Pick	
January 17, 2013	(Jamaica) Deshorn Brown	FW	(United States) University of Central Florida	2013 MLS SuperDraft 1st Round, 6th Overall Pick, Generation Adidas	
January 17, 2013	(United States) Dillon Powers	MF	(United States) University of Notre Dame	2013 MLS SuperDraft 1st Round, 11th Overall Pick, acquired pick in Jeff Larentowicz trade from Chicago Fire	
January 17, 2013	(United States) Kory Kindle	DF	(United States) California State University Bakersfield	2013 MLS SuperDraft 2nd Round, 25th Overall Pick	
April 30, 2013	(Jamaica) Brenton Griffiths	DF	(United States) University of South Florida	2013 MLS Supplemental Draft 2nd Round, 25th Overall Pick	

== Competitions ==
=== Preseason ===
January 29, 2013 The Desert Friendlies presented by FC Tucson	Portland Timbers	3–1	Colorado Rapids	Tucson, Arizona, U.S.
	Diego Valeri 28' Kalif Alhassan 63' José Adolfo Valencia 79'	Report	Deshorn Brown 88'	Stadium: Kino Sports Complex

January 31, 2013 The Desert Friendlies presented by FC Tucson	Houston Dynamo	1–0	Colorado Rapids	Tucson, Arizona, U.S.
	Calum Elliot 2'	Report		Stadium: Kino Sports Complex

February 2, 2013 The Desert Friendlies presented by FC Tucson	San Jose Earthquakes	0–1	Colorado Rapids	Tucson, Arizona, U.S.
		Report	Jamie Smith 65'	Stadium: Kino Sports Complex

February 15, 2013 Pro Soccer Challenge	Chivas USA	3–0	Colorado Rapids	Las Vegas, Nevada, U.S.
	Eric Avila 3' Juan Agudelo 56' (pen.) Jose Correa 60'	Report		Stadium: Sam Boyd Stadium; Attendance: 8,258

February 22, 2013	LA Galaxy	2–1	Colorado Rapids	Santa Barbara, California, U.S.
	Marcelo Sarvas 36' Robbie Keane (yellow card) 58'; Michael Stephens (yellow card) 68' Jack McBean 80'	Report	Drew Moor 12'; Hendry Thomas (yellow card) 44'	Stadium: Harder Stadium

=== MLS ===
March 2, 2013 1	FC Dallas	1–0	Colorado Rapids	Frisco, Texas, U.S.
8:30 pm EST	Jackson 11'; Je-Vaughn Watson (yellow card) 80'	Report		Stadium: FC Dallas Stadium; Attendance: 18,075; Referee: Allen Chapman

March 10, 2013 2	Colorado Rapids	1–2	Philadelphia Union	Commerce City, Colorado, U.S.
3:00 pm EST	Kevin Harbottle (yellow card) 37' Hendry Thomas (yellow card) 67' Jamie Smith 68'	Report	Amobi Okugo 34' Jack McInerney 79' Danny Cruz (yellow card) 91'	Stadium: Dick's Sporting Goods Park; Attendance: 15,122; Referee: Ismail Elfath

March 16, 2013 3	Real Salt Lake	1–1	Colorado Rapids	Sandy, Utah, U.S.
6:00 pm EST	Kwame Watson-Siriboe (yellow card) 6'; Alvaro Saborio 80'	Report	Atiba Harris (yellow card) 8' Deshorn Brown 37' Hendry Thomas (yellow card) 49'	Stadium: Rio Tinto Stadium; Attendance: 20,370; Referee: David Gantar

March 23, 2013 4	LA Galaxy	1–0	Colorado Rapids	Carson, California, U.S.
10:30 pm EST	Mike Magee 50' (pen.); Marcelo Sarvas (yellow card) 73'	Report	Drew Moor (red card) 48'; Hendry Thomas (yellow card) 64'	Stadium: The Home Depot Center; Attendance: 19,936; Referee: Armando Villarreal

March 30, 2013 5	Colorado Rapids	2–2	Portland Timbers	Commerce City, Colorado, U.S.
6:00 pm EST	Nick LaBrocca (yellow card) 10' Dillon Powers 18' Hendry Thomas 48' (pen.)	Report	Diego Chara (yellow card) 12'; Will Johnson 55', 71' (pen.)	Stadium: Dick's Sporting Goods Park; Attendance: 11,774; Referee: Drew Fischer

April 6, 2013 6	Colorado Rapids	1–0	Real Salt Lake	Commerce City, Colorado, U.S.
6:00 pm EST	Atiba Harris 5'; Chris Klute (yellow card) 80'	Report		Stadium: Dick's Sporting Goods Park; Attendance: 15,226; Referee: Chris Penso

April 13, 2013 7	Chivas USA	0–1	Colorado Rapids	Carson, California, U.S.
10:30 pm EST	Jorge Villafaña (yellow card) 33' Bobby Burling (yellow card) 45'; Joaquin Velázquez (yellow card) 52' Mario de Luna (yellow card) 84'	Report	Deshorn Brown 7'; Marvell Wynne (yellow card) 84'	Stadium: The Home Depot Center; Attendance: 8,219; Referee: Kevin Stott

April 20, 2013 8	Colorado Rapids	0–1	Seattle Sounders FC	Commerce City, Colorado, U.S.
6:00 pm EST	Dillon Powers (yellow card) 41'	Report	Obafemi Martins 27' Djimi Traore (yellow card) 67' Leonardo Gonzalez (yellow card) 84'	Stadium: Dick's Sporting Goods Park; Attendance: 12,063; Referee: Silviu Petrescu

April 28, 2013 9	Houston Dynamo	1–1	Colorado Rapids	Houston, Texas, U.S.
5:00 pm EST	Giles Barnes 66'; Ricardo Clark (yellow card) 69'; Bobby Boswell (yellow card) 87'; Brad Davis (yellow card) 90' (red card) 90+5'	Report	Drew Moor 45+2'; Shane O'Neill (yellow card) 70'; Nathan Sturgis (yellow card) 72'	Stadium: BBVA Compass Stadium; Attendance: 19,839; Referee: Juan Guzman

May 4, 2013 10	Colorado Rapids	1–0	Toronto FC	Commerce City, Colorado, U.S.
9:00 pm EST	Dillon Powers (yellow card) 39'; Edson Buddle 86'	Report	Darel Russell (yellow card) 90+2'	Stadium: Dick's Sporting Goods Park; Attendance: 12,658; Referee: Matthew Foerster

May 11, 2013 11	Columbus Crew	0–2	Colorado Rapids	Columbus, Ohio, U.S.
7:30 pm EST	Jairo Arrieta (yellow card) 18' Gláuber (yellow card) 78'	Report	Edson Buddle 8' (yellow card) 58'; Dillon Powers 69'; Martin Rivero (yellow card) 75'	Stadium: Crew Stadium; Attendance: 11,269; Referee: Mark Geiger

May 18, 2013 12	San Jose Earthquakes	1–1	Colorado Rapids	Santa Clara, California, U.S.
10:30 pm EST	Victor Bernardez (yellow card) 73'; Marvin Chavez 78'; Steven Lenhart (yellow card) 81'	Report	Nathan Sturgis 26'; Chris Klute (yellow card) 43'; Shane O'Neill (yellow card) 77' (red card) 90'; Anthony Wallace (yellow card) 90+3'	Stadium: Buck Shaw Stadium; Attendance: 10,525; Referee: Ricardo Salazar

May 25, 2013 13	Colorado Rapids	2–0	Chivas USA	Commerce City, Colorado, U.S.
9:00 pm EST	Atiba Harris 11'; Nathan Sturgis 78'	Report	Carlos Alvarez (yellow card) 40'; Bobby Burling (yellow card) 44'	Stadium: Dick's Sporting Goods Park; Attendance: 18,204; Referee: Allen Chapman

June 1, 2013 14	Colorado Rapids	2–2	FC Dallas	Commerce City, Colorado, U.S.
9:00 pm EST	Atiba Harris 56', 64'; Dillon Powers (yellow card) 59'	Report	Blas Perez 61', 66' Michel (yellow card) 63' Andrew Jacobson (yellow card) 90+6'	Stadium: Dick's Sporting Goods Park; Attendance: 17,551; Referee: Ismail Elfath

June 15, 2013 15	Colorado Rapids	1–2	San Jose Earthquakes	Commerce City, Colorado, U.S.
9:00 pm EST	Atiba Harris (red card) 18' Hendry Thomas (yellow card) 49' Nathan Sturgis 67'	Report	Steven Lenhart 11' Chris Wondolowski (yellow card) 49'; Sam Cronin 52'; Alan Gordon (yellow card) 68'; Mehdi Ballouchy (yellow card) 71' Jason Hernandez (yellow card) 87'	Stadium: Dick's Sporting Goods Park; Attendance: 15,017; Referee: Jorge Gonzalez

June 19, 2013 16	Chicago Fire	2–1	Colorado Rapids	Bridgeview, Illinois, U.S.
8:30 pm EST	Mike Magee 23' Austin Berry 47' Jeff Larentowicz (yellow card) 60'	Report	Deshorn Brown 17' Brian Mullan (yellow card) 70'; Nathan Sturgis (yellow card) 81' Germán Mera (yellow card) 84'	Stadium: Toyota Park; Attendance: 11,349; Referee: Edvin Jurisevic

June 23, 2013 17	Portland Timbers	3–0	Colorado Rapids	Portland, Oregon, U.S.
7:00 pm EST	Frédéric Piquionne 12' Will Johnson 45' Ryan Johnson 84'	Report		Stadium: JELD-WEN Field; Attendance: 20,674; Referee: Silviu Petrescu

June 29, 2013 18	Montreal Impact	3–4	Colorado Rapids	Montreal, Quebec, Canada
7:00 pm EST	Atiba Harris 24'; Germán Mera (yellow card) 48'; Nick LaBrocca (yellow card) 52'; Dillon Powers 59'; Deshorn Brown 77'; Tony Cascio 90+6'	Report	Hassoun Camara 39'; Daniele Paponi 42', 72'; Jed Brovsky (yellow card) 55'	Stadium: Stade Saputo; Attendance: 20,383; Referee: Drew Fischer

July 4, 2013 19	Colorado Rapids	2–0	New York Red Bulls	Commerce City, Colorado, U.S.
9:30 pm EST	Nathan Sturgis 47'; Deshorn Brown 68'	Report		Stadium: Dick's Sporting Goods Park; Attendance: 18,359; Referee: Armando Villarreal

July 7, 2013 20	Colorado Rapids	0–0	D.C. United	Commerce City, Colorado, U.S.
9:30 pm EST	Hendry Thomas (yellow card) 2'; Shane O'Neill (yellow card) 39'	Report	Casey Townsend (yellow card) 86'	Stadium: Dick's Sporting Goods Park; Attendance: 14,739; Referee: Drew Fischer

July 17, 2013 21	Colorado Rapids	2–1	New England Revolution	Commerce City, Colorado, U.S.
9:00 pm EST	Nick LaBrocca 62'; Jose Goncalves 67' (o.g.)	Report	Juan Carlos Toja 15'; Jose Goncalves (yellow card) 74'	Stadium: Dick's Sporting Goods Park; Attendance: 13,833; Referee: Allen Chapman

July 20, 2013 22	Seattle Sounders FC	1–1	Colorado Rapids	Seattle, Washington, U.S.
4:00 pm EST	Drew Moor 60'; Nathan Sturgis (yellow card) 83'	Report	Zach Scott (yellow card) 42' Servando Carrasco (yellow card) 43' DeAndre Yedlin 65'	Stadium: CenturyLink Field; Attendance: 39,196; Referee: Ismail Elfath

July 27, 2013 23	Colorado Rapids	2–0	LA Galaxy	Commerce City, Colorado, U.S.
7:00 pm EST	Hendry Thomas (yellow card) 9' (goal) 41'; Dillon Powers 47'	Report	Juninho (yellow card) 29'; Pablo Mastroeni (yellow card) 30'	Stadium: Dick's Sporting Goods Park; Attendance: 15,765; Referee: Juan Guzman

August 3, 2013 24	Colorado Rapids	2–2	Real Salt Lake	Commerce City, Colorado, U.S.
8:30 pm EST	Deshorn Brown 9' Clint Irwin (yellow card) 21'; Jaime Castrillón 70' Shane O'Neill (yellow card) 90'	Report	Ned Grabavoy 2' Alvaro Saborio 21' (pen.) Kyle Beckerman (yellow card) 73'	Stadium: Dick's Sporting Goods Park; Attendance: 16,814; Referee: Fotis Bazakos

August 11, 2013 25	Chivas USA	1–1	Colorado Rapids	Carson, California, U.S.
11:00 pm EST	Carlos Alvarez 5' Steve Purdy (yellow card) 27'; Gabriel Farfan (red card) 33'; Tristan Bowen (red card) 63' Marco Delgado (yellow card) 90+1'	Report	Tony Cascio (yellow card) 40' (yellow card) 49' (red card) Martin Rivero 80' Nathan Sturgis (yellow card) 90+3'	Stadium: StubHub Center; Attendance: 8,221; Referee: Chris Penso

August 17, 2013 26	Colorado Rapids	2–0	Vancouver Whitecaps FC	Commerce City, Colorado, U.S.
9:00 pm EST	Deshorn Brown 36' (yellow card) 51'; Edson Buddle 79'	Report	Jordan Harvey (yellow card) 71'	Stadium: Dick's Sporting Goods Park; Attendance: 16,030; Referee: Carlos Rivera

August 31, 2013 27	Sporting Kansas City	2–1	Colorado Rapids	Kansas City, Kansas, U.S.
8:30 pm EST	Benny Feilhaber 33' Oriol Rosell (yellow card) 70' Graham Zusi 88'	Report	Hendry Thomas (yellow card) 65' Edson Buddle 77' Drew Moor (yellow card) 90+1'	Stadium: Sporting Park; Attendance: 19,579; Referee: Silviu Petrescu

September 7, 2013 28	LA Galaxy	0–1	Colorado Rapids	Carson, California, U.S.
10:30 pm EST	Juninho (yellow card) 49'	Report	Dillon Powers (yellow card) 54'; Edson Buddle 75'	Stadium: StubHub Center; Attendance: 20,801; Referee: Allen Chapman

September 14, 2013 29	Colorado Rapids	2–1	FC Dallas	Commerce City, Colorado, U.S.
9:00 pm EST	Vicente Sanchez 59' Matt Hedges 65' (o.g.) Nathan Sturgis (yellow card) 76'	Report	David Ferreira 51'	Stadium: Dick's Sporting Goods Park; Attendance: 13,145; Referee: Ricardo Salazar

September 20, 2013 30	Portland Timbers	1–0	Colorado Rapids	Portland, Oregon, U.S.
10:00 pm EST	Diego Valeri 13' Maximiliano Urruti (yellow card) 45' Kalif Alhassan (yellow card) 90+1'	Report	Atiba Harris (yellow card) 3'	Stadium: JELD-WEN Field; Attendance: 20,674; Referee: Hilario Grajeda

October 5, 2013 31	Colorado Rapids	5–1	Seattle Sounders FC	Commerce City, Colorado, U.S.
10:00 pm EST	Deshorn Brown 1', 31'; Dillon Powers 10'; Drew Moor 41'; Gabriel Torres 90+1'	Report	Zach Scott (yellow card) 8' (yellow card) 79' (red card); Eddie Johnson 63'	Stadium: Dick's Sporting Goods Park; Attendance: 18,076; Referee: David Gantar

October 9, 2013 32	San Jose Earthquakes	1–0	Colorado Rapids	Santa Clara, California, U.S.
10:30 pm EST	Chris Wondolowski 63' (yellow card) 78'	Report		Stadium: Buck Shaw Stadium; Attendance: 10,525; Referee: Allen Chapman

October 19, 2013 33	Colorado Rapids	3–2	Vancouver Whitecaps FC	Commerce City, Colorado, U.S.
6:00 pm EST	Gabriel Torres 41' (pen.) 77' Deshorn Brown 51' Nathan Sturgis (yellow card) 69'	Report	Jordan Harvey (yellow card) 11' Kekuta Manneh 32' Camilo Sanvezzo 75' (pen.)	Stadium: Dick's Sporting Goods Park; Attendance: 18,103; Referee: Armando Villarreal

October 27, 2013 34	Vancouver Whitecaps FC	3–0	Colorado Rapids	Vancouver, British Columbia, Canada
8:00 pm EST	Camilo Sanvezzo 43', 74', 84' (yellow card) 85'	Report	Nick LaBrocca (yellow card) 51'; Shane O'Neill (yellow card) 83'	Stadium: BC Place; Attendance: 21,000; Referee: Ricardo Salazar

=== MLS Cup Playoffs ===
October 30, 2013 Knockout Round	Seattle Sounders FC	2–0	Colorado Rapids	Seattle, Washington
10:30 pm EST	Brad Evans 28'; Lamar Neagle (yellow card) 78'; Michael Gspurning (red card) 85'; Eddie Johnson (yellow card) 89' (goal) 90+3'	Report	Hendry Thomas (yellow card) 23' Atiba Harris (yellow card) 45+1'; Clint Irwin (yellow card) 53' Germán Mera (yellow card) 79'	Stadium: CenturyLink Field; Attendance: 32,204; Referee: Silviu Petrescu

==== Standings ====
===== Western Conference standings =====
Pos	Team	Pld	W	L	T	GF	GA	GD	Pts	Qualification
1	Portland Timbers	34	14	5	15	54	33	+21	57	MLS Cup Conference Semifinals
2	Real Salt Lake	34	16	10	8	57	41	+16	56	MLS Cup Conference Semifinals
3	LA Galaxy	34	15	11	8	53	38	+15	53	MLS Cup Conference Semifinals
4	Seattle Sounders FC	34	15	12	7	42	42	0	52	MLS Cup Knockout Round
5	Colorado Rapids	34	14	11	9	45	38	+7	51	MLS Cup Knockout Round
6	San Jose Earthquakes	34	14	11	9	35	42	−7	51	
7	Vancouver Whitecaps FC	34	13	12	9	53	45	+8	48	
8	FC Dallas	34	11	12	11	48	52	−4	44	
9	Chivas USA	34	6	20	8	30	67	−37	26	

Source: MLS

===== Overall table =====
Note: the table below has no impact on playoff qualification and is used solely for determining host of the MLS Cup, certain CCL spots, and 2014 MLS draft. The conference tables are the sole determinant for teams qualifying to the playoffs

Pos	Team	Pld	W	L	T	GF	GA	GD	Pts	Qualification
1	New York Red Bulls (S)	34	17	9	8	58	41	+17	59	CONCACAF Champions League
2	Sporting Kansas City (C)	34	17	10	7	47	30	+17	58	CONCACAF Champions League
3	Portland Timbers	34	14	5	15	54	33	+21	57	CONCACAF Champions League
4	Real Salt Lake	34	16	10	8	57	41	+16	56	
5	LA Galaxy	34	15	11	8	53	38	+15	53	
6	Seattle Sounders FC	34	15	12	7	42	42	0	52	
7	New England Revolution	34	14	11	9	49	38	+11	51	
8	Colorado Rapids	34	14	11	9	45	38	+7	51	
9	Houston Dynamo	34	14	11	9	41	41	0	51	
10	San Jose Earthquakes	34	14	11	9	35	42	−7	51	
11	Montreal Impact	34	14	13	7	50	49	+1	49	CONCACAF Champions League
12	Chicago Fire	34	14	13	7	47	52	−5	49	
13	Vancouver Whitecaps FC	34	13	12	9	53	45	+8	48	
14	Philadelphia Union	34	12	12	10	42	44	−2	46	
15	FC Dallas	34	11	12	11	48	52	−4	44	
16	Columbus Crew	34	12	17	5	42	46	−4	41	
17	Toronto FC	34	6	17	11	30	47	−17	29	
18	Chivas USA	34	6	20	8	30	67	−37	26	
19	D.C. United	34	3	24	7	22	59	−37	16	CONCACAF Champions League

Source: MLS
Rules for classification: 1) points; 2) head-to-head record; 3) goal difference; 4) number of goals scored
(C) MLS Cup Champion; (S) Supporters' Shield

==== Results summary ====
Overall								Home						Away					
Pld	W	D	L	GF	GA	GD	Pts	W	D	L	GF	GA	GD	W	D	L	GF	GA	GD
34	14	9	11	45	37	+8	51	10	4	3	30	16	+14	4	5	8	15	21	−6

Last updated: 28 October 2013.
Source: Major League Soccer

==== Results by round ====
Round	1	2	3	4	5	6	7	8	9	10	11	12	13	14	15	16	17	18	19	20	21	22	23	24	25	26	27	28	29	30	31	32	33	34
Stadium	A	H	A	A	H	H	A	H	A	H	A	A	H	H	H	A	A	A	H	H	H	A	H	H	A	H	A	A	H	A	H	A	H	A
Result	L	L	D	L	D	W	W	L	D	W	W	D	W	D	L	L	L	W	W	D	W	D	W	D	D	W	L	W	W	L	W	L	W	L

Updated to match(es) played on 28 October 2013. Source: Colorado Rapids
A = Away; H = Home; W = Win; D = Draw; L = Loss

=== U.S. Open Cup ===
May 28, 2013 3	Orlando City S.C.	3–1	Colorado Rapids	Orlando, Florida, U.S.
7:30 pm EST	Bryan Burke 4' Bryan Burke (yellow card) 30'; Dominic Dwyer 48' Long Tan 63'	Report	Kamani Hill 18' Steward Ceus (red card) 56' Atiba Harris (yellow card) 82'	Stadium: Citrus Bowl

=== Friendly ===
July 12, 2013	Santos Laguna	2–1	Colorado Rapids	Albuquerque, New Mexico, U.S.
9:30 pm EST	Alonso Escoboza 17'; Néstor Calderón 77'	Report	Kevin Harbottle 12'	Stadium: Branch Field at University Stadium

== Statistics ==
=== Top scorers ===
Rank	Pos	No.	Player	MLS	MLS Cup Playoffs	U.S. Open Cup	Total
1	FW	26	Deshorn Brown	10	0	0	10
2	FW	16	Atiba Harris	5	0	0	5
2	MF	8	Dillon Powers	5	0	0	5
2	FW	9	Edson Buddle	5	0	0	5
3	MF	24	Nathan Sturgis	4	0	0	4
4	DF	3	Drew Moor	3	0	0	3
4	FW	30	Gabriel Torres	3	0	0	3
5	MF	12	Hendry Thomas	2	0	0	2
6	MF	20	Jamie Smith	1	0	0	1
6	MF	23	Jaime Castrillón	1	0	0	1
6	FW	13	Kamani Hill	0	0	1	1
6	MF	10	Martin Rivero	1	0	0	1
6	MF	2	Nick LaBrocca	1	0	0	1
6	FW	14	Tony Cascio	1	0	0	1
6	FW	7	Vicente Sánchez	1	0	0	1

=== Top assists ===
Rank	Pos	No.	Player	MLS	MLS Cup Playoffs	U.S. Open Cup	Total
1	DF	15	Chris Klute	7	0	0	7
2	MF	8	Dillon Powers	6	0	0	6
3	FW	26	Deshorn Brown	4	0	0	4
3	FW	7	Vicente Sánchez	4	0	0	4
4	FW	9	Edson Buddle	3	0	0	3
4	MF	2	Nick LaBrocca	3	0	0	3
4	MF	10	Martin Rivero	3	0	0	3
5	DF	11	Brian Mullan	2	0	0	2
5	DF	22	Marvell Wynne	2	0	0	2
6	FW	16	Atiba Harris	1	0	0	1
6	GK	31	Clint Irwin	1	0	0	1
6	MF	55	Danny Mwanga	1	0	0	1
6	MF	12	Hendry Thomas	1	0	0	1
6	MF	24	Nathan Sturgis	1	0	0	1

=== Goalkeeping ===
R	Player	Position	GAA	GA	Saves	GS	GP
1	(United States) Clint Irwin	GK	1.13	36	92	31	32
2	(Haiti) Steward Ceus	GK	1.00	1	5	1	1
3	(United States) Matt Pickens	GK	2.00	2	2	2	2

=== Disciplinary record ===
Includes all competitive matches. The list is sorted by position, and then shirt number.

N	P	Nat.	Name	Major League Soccer			U.S. Open Cup			Playoffs			Others			Total			Notes
N	P	Nat.	Name	Yellow card	Second yellow card	Red card	Yellow card	Second yellow card	Red card	Yellow card	Second yellow card	Red card	Yellow card	Second yellow card	Red card	Yellow card	Second yellow card	Red card	Notes
6	MF	(United States)	Anthony Wallace	1												1			
16	FW	(Saint Kitts and Nevis)	Atiba Harris	2		1	1			1						4		1	Suspended for 1 game
11	MF	(United States)	Brian Mullan	1												1			
15	DF	(United States)	Chris Klute	2												2			
31	GK	(United States)	Clint Irwin	1						1						2			
26	FW	(Jamaica)	Deshorn Brown	1												1			
8	MF	(United States)	Dillon Powers	4												4			
3	DF	(United States)	Drew Moor	1		1										1		1	Suspended for 2 games
9	FW	(United States)	Edson Buddle	1												1			Suspended for 1 game
33	DF	(Colombia)	Germán Mera	2						1						3			
12	MF	(Honduras)	Hendry Thomas	7						1						8			Suspended for 3 games
7	FW	(Chile)	Kevin Harbottle	1												1			
10	MF	(Argentina)	Martin Rivero	1												1			
22	DF	(United States)	Marvell Wynne	1												1			
24	MF	(United States)	Nathan Sturgis	6												6			
2	MF	(United States)	Nick LaBrocca	3												3			
27	FW	(United States)	Shane O'Neill	6		1										6		1	Suspended for 1 game
21	GK	(Haiti)	Steward Ceus						1									1	
14	FW	(United States)	Tony Cascio	1	1											1	1		Suspended for 1 game

Last updated: October 28, 2013
Source: Competitive matches
Ordered by (red card) , (second yellow card) and (yellow card)
(yellow card) = Number of bookings; (second yellow card) = Number of sending offs after a second yellow card; (red card) = Number of sending offs by a direct red card. Last updated: October, 2013
Source: Competitive matches
Only competitive matches

Italic: denotes no longer with club.
