= 2014 Colorado Rapids season =

Colorado Rapids
2014 season
- Owner: Stan Kroenke
- Head coach: Pablo Mastroeni
- Major League Soccer: Western Conference: 8th Overall: 17th
- U.S. Open Cup: Fifth round
- Highest home attendance: 18,432 vs. Columbus Crew (July 4)
- Lowest home attendance: 10,086 vs. Chivas USA (May 11)
- Average home league attendance: 14,567
Home colors	Away colors

The 2014 Colorado Rapids season was the club's nineteenth season of existence, and their nineteenth season in Major League Soccer, the top tier of the American and Canadian soccer pyramids.

Finishing eighth in the West and seventeenth overall, the Rapids failed to qualify for the MLS Cup Playoffs, after previously qualifying last year. Despite an upper-mid table performance to start the season, the club was plagued heavily by injuries, causing the team to go winless in their final fourteen matches of the season, twelve of which, were losses. In the U.S. Open Cup, the Rapids won their first fixture against Orlando City, 5–2. In the fifth round, they fell to the Atlanta Silverbacks. Additionally, they were unable to defend their Rocky Mountain Cup title, losing to rivals, Real Salt Lake.

== Club ==
=== Roster ===
Updated July 20, 2014.

No.	Position	Nation	Player
1	GK	USA	Clint Irwin
2	MF	USA	Nick LaBrocca
3	DF	USA	Drew Moor
4	DF	USA	Marc Burch
5	DF	AUT	Thomas Piermayr
6	MF	ESP	José Mari
7	FW	URU	Vicente Sánchez
8	MF	USA	Dillon Powers
9	FW	USA	Edson Buddle
10	FW	PAN	Gabriel Torres
11	MF	USA	Brian Mullan
12	GK	USA	John Berner
13	FW	USA	Kamani Hill
15	DF	USA	Chris Klute
16	DF	USA	John Neeskens
17	MF	USA	Dillon Serna (HGP)
19	FW	CMR	Charles Eloundou
21	MF	USA	Grant Van De Casteele
22	DF	USA	Marvell Wynne
23	GK	USA	Joe Nasco
26	FW	JAM	Deshorn Brown (GA)
27	MF	USA	Shane O'Neill (HGP)
28	MF	USA	Davy Armstrong (HGP)
33	MF	USA	Jared Watts
44	DF	USA	Gale Agbossoumonde
55	FW	COD	Danny Mwanga
57	DF	USA	Carlos Alvarez
94	MF	USA	Marlon Hairston (GA)
—	MF	USA	Tony Cascio (on loan at Houston Dynamo)

=== Technical Staff ===
As of February 18, 2014.

Position	Name
Technical director	Paul Bravo
Head coach	Pablo Mastroeni
Assistant coach	John Metgod
Assistant coach	Steve Cooke
Assistant coach/Goalkeepers	Chris Sharpe
Director of Team Operations	Jeff Mathews
Team Administrator	Erik Carlson
Head Athletic Trainer	Jamie Rojas
Assistant Athletic Trainer	Michael Heitkamp
Equipment Manager	Brandy Lay

== Transfers ==
=== Transfers In ===
Date	Player	Position	Previous club	Fee/notes	Ref
January 7, 2014	(Honduras) Marvin Chávez	MF	(United States) San Jose Earthquakes	Acquired in exchange for Atiba Harris	
February 12, 2014	(United States) Joe Nasco	GK	(United States) Atlanta Silverbacks		
March 4, 2014	(Spain) José Marí	MF	(Spain) Real Zaragoza		
April 4, 2014	(Austria) Thomas Piermayr	DF	(Norway) Lillestrøm SK		
May 8, 2014	(United States) Gale Agbossoumonde	DF	(Canada) Toronto FC	Acquired in a three team trade, Colorado sent Marvin Chávez to Chivas USA	
May 14, 2014	(United States) John Neeskens	DF	Unattached	Signed on a Free Transfer	
July 1, 2014	(United States) Carlos Alvarez	MF	(United States) Chivas USA	Acquired in exchange for Nathan Sturgis	

=== Transfers Out ===
Date	Player	Position	Destination club	Fee/notes	Ref
December 2, 2013	(Ecuador) Diego Calderón	DF		Option Declined, later signed with LDU Quito	
December 4, 2013	(Colombia) Jaime Castrillón	MF		Option Declined	
December 6, 2013	(Haiti) Steward Ceus	GK		Option Declined	
December 9, 2013	(Scotland) Jamie Smith	MF		Option Declined, later retired	
December 9, 2013	(United States) Brian Mullan	MF		Option Declined, later re-signed	
January 7, 2014	(Saint Kitts and Nevis) Atiba Harris	MF	(United States) San Jose Earthquakes	Sent in exchange for Marvin Chávez	
January 21, 2014	(United States) Tony Cascio	MF	(United States) Houston Dynamo	Sent on interleague loan for the 2014 MLS Season in exchange for an international roster slot	
February 10, 2014	(United States) Anthony Wallace	DF	(United States) Tampa Bay Rowdies		
February 12, 2014	(United States) Hendry Thomas	MF	(United States) FC Dallas	Sent in exchange for allocation money	
February 18, 2014	(United States) Kory Kindle	DF		Retired to go back to school	
March 20, 2014	(United States) Matt Pickens	GK	(United States) New England Revolution	Waived, later claimed by New England	
May 8, 2014	(Honduras) Marvin Chávez	MF	(United States) Chivas USA	Sent in a three team trade, Colorado received Gale Agbossoumonde from Toronto FC	
June 11, 2014	(Jamaica) Brenton Griffiths	MF		Released	
July 1, 2014	(United States) Nathan Sturgis	MF	(United States) Chivas USA	Sent to Chivas USA in exchange for Carlos Alvarez	

=== Draft picks ===
Date	Player	Position	Previous club	Fee/notes	Ref
December 12, 2013	(United States) Marc Burch	MF	(United States) Seattle Sounders FC	2013 MLS Re-Entry Draft 1st Stage, 1st Round, 11th Overall Pick	
January 16, 2014	(United States) Marlon Hairston	MF	(United States) University of Louisville	2014 MLS SuperDraft 1st Round, 12th Overall Pick, Generation Adidas	
January 16, 2014	(United States) Grant Van De Casteele	DF	(United States) University of Notre Dame	2014 MLS SuperDraft 1st Round, 19th Overall Pick	
January 16, 2014	(United States) Jared Watts	MF	(United States) Wake Forest University	2014 MLS SuperDraft 2nd Round, 33rd Overall Pick	
January 16, 2014	(United States) John Berner	GK	(United States) Southern Illinois University Edwardsville	2014 MLS SuperDraft 2nd Round, 35th Overall Pick	
January 21, 2014	(United States) Tolani Ibikunle	DF	(United States) Wake Forest University	2014 MLS SuperDraft 3rd Round, 48th Overall Pick	
January 21, 2014	(Australia) Albert Edward	DF	(United States) Lindsey Wilson College	2014 MLS SuperDraft 4th Round, 68th Overall Pick	

== Competitions ==
=== Preseason ===
February 2, 2014 Scrimmage	Houston Dynamo	2–3	Colorado Rapids	Houston, Texas, U.S.
	Cascio 16'; Barnes 38'	Report	Serna 12'; Brown 47'; Torres 86'	Stadium: Houston Amateur Sports Park

February 6, 2014 Scrimmage	Houston Baptist Huskies	0–3	Colorado Rapids	Houston, Texas, U.S.
		Report	Brown 12'; Serna 68'; Galindo 76'	Stadium: Houston Amateur Sports Park

February 14, 2014 Scrimmage	UNLV Rebels	0–2	Colorado Rapids	Las Vegas, Nevada, U.S.
2:00 pm PST		Report	Chávez 60'; Sánchez 78'	Stadium: Johann Field

February 16, 2014 Las Vegas ProSoccer Challenge	Chivas USA	2–1	Colorado Rapids	Las Vegas, Nevada, U.S.
7:30 pm PST	Torres 19' (pen.); Rosales (yellow card) 59'; Bautista 83' (pen.)	Report	Brown 16'; Guzman (yellow card) 59'	Stadium: Sam Boyd Stadium

February 19, 2014 2014 Desert Diamond Cup	Chicago Fire	2–1	Colorado Rapids	Tucson, Arizona, U.S.
3:30 pm MST	Ward 37'; Amarikwa 40'	Report	Torres 68'	Stadium: Kino Sports Complex

February 22, 2014 2014 Desert Diamond Cup	Colorado Rapids	1–0	Real Salt Lake	Tucson, Arizona, U.S.
3:30 pm MST	Brown 69'	Report	Wingert (yellow card) 30'	Stadium: Kino Sports Complex

February 26, 2014 2014 Desert Diamond Cup	Chivas USA	0–0	Colorado Rapids	Tucson, Arizona, U.S.
1:00 pm MST		Report	Sánchez (yellow card) 32'; Watts (yellow card) 45+'	Stadium: Kino Sports Complex

March 1, 2014 2014 Desert Diamond Cup	New England Revolution	2–2	Colorado Rapids	Tucson, Arizona, U.S.
3:30 pm MST	Bunbury 5'; Rowe (yellow card) 38'; Mullins 58'; Imbongo (red card) 85'	Report	Buddle 25'; LaBrocca (yellow card) 35'; José Mari (yellow card) 55'; Sánchez 82'; Chávez (red card) 85'	Stadium: Kino Sports Complex

=== MLS ===
March 15, 2014 1	New York Red Bulls	1–1	Colorado Rapids	Harrison, New Jersey, U.S.
4:00 pm EDT	Henry 57'; Sam (yellow card) 79'; Armando (yellow card) 85'	Report	Brown (yellow card) 61'; Sánchez 72' (pen.)	Stadium: Red Bull Arena; Attendance: 20,542; Referee: Alan Kelly

March 22, 2014 2	Colorado Rapids	2–0	Portland Timbers	Commerce City, Colorado, U.S.
4:00 pm EDT	Powers (yellow card) 63'; Sánchez 73' (pen.); Brown 75'; José Marí (yellow card) 84' (red card) 90'	Report	Ricketts (red card) 71'; Andrew Weber (yellow card) 74'	Stadium: Dick's Sporting Goods Park; Attendance: 15,135; Referee: Mark Geiger

March 29, 2014 3	Colorado Rapids	2–3	Sporting Kansas City	Commerce City, Colorado, U.S.
4:00 pm MDT	Wynne (yellow card) 43' (red card) 85'; Sánchez 60' (pen.), 78' (pen.); LaBrocca (yellow card) 89'; Sturgis (yellow card) 90+3'	Report	Kronberg (yellow card) 29'; Zusi 50'; Nagamura (yellow card) 72'; Feilhaber 79'; Dwyer 90+2'	Stadium: Dick's Sporting Goods Park; Attendance: 12,203; Referee: Jose Carlos Rivero

April 5, 2014 4	Vancouver Whitecaps FC	1–2	Colorado Rapids	Vancouver, British Columbia, Canada
3:30 pm PDT	Laba (yellow card) 54' (red card) 77'; Mattocks 67'	Report	Hill (yellow card) 25'; Burch (yellow card) 65'; José Marí 79', 81'; Eloundou (yellow card) 80'; Irwin (yellow card) 90+6'	Stadium: BC Place; Attendance: 21,000; Referee: Ioannis Stravrides

April 12, 2014 5	Toronto FC	0–1	Colorado Rapids	Toronto, Ontario, Canada
4:00 pm EDT	Caldwell (yellow card) 17'	Report	Buddle 77'	Stadium: BMO Field; Attendance: 22,591; Referee: David Gantar

April 19, 2014 6	Colorado Rapids	0–0	San Jose Earthquakes	Commerce City, Colorado, U.S.
6:00 pm EDT		Report	Görlitz (yellow card) 15'; Harris (yellow card) 25'; Jahn (red card) 87'	Stadium: Dick's Sporting Goods Park; Attendance: 12,306; Referee: Edvin Jurisevic

April 26, 2014 7	Seattle Sounders FC	4–1	Colorado Rapids	Seattle, Washington, U.S.
1:00 PM PDT	Neagle 45+1'; Dempsey 47', 52'; Martins 75'	Report	Piermayr (yellow card) 26'; Torres (yellow card) 37'; Serna 62'	Stadium: CenturyLink Field; Attendance: 38,582; Referee: Armando Villarreal

May 3, 2014 8	Colorado Rapids	1–0	LA Galaxy	Commerce City, Colorado, U.S.
7:00 pm MDT	Sánchez 20'	report	Juninho (yellow card) 88'; Samuel (yellow card) 90+3'	Stadium: Dick's Sporting Goods Park; Attendance: 14,040; Referee: Hilario Grajeda

May 7, 2014 9	San Jose Earthquakes	0–0	Colorado Rapids	Santa Clara, California, U.S.
7:30 pm PDT	Bernárdez (yellow card) 78'	Report	Eloundou (yellow card) 43'	Stadium: Buck Shaw Stadium; Attendance: 9,388; Referee: Ismail Elfath

May 11, 2014 10	Colorado Rapids	1–3	Chivas USA	Commerce City, Colorado, U.S.
3:00 pm MDT	LaBrocca (yellow card) 70'; Brown 90+2'	Report	Torres 56'; Rivero (yellow card) 61'; Chávez 67', 76' (yellow card) 68'	Stadium: Dick's Sporting Goods Park; Attendance: 10,086; Referee: (United States) Fotis Bazakos

May 17, 2014 11; Rocky Mountain Cup	Real Salt Lake	2 - 1	Colorado Rapids	Sandy, Utah, U.S.
7:30 pm MDT	Plata 23'; Grossman (yellow card) 33'; Mulholland (yellow card) 44'; Morales 52' (pen.) (yellow card) 64'; Stertzer (yellow card) 90+3'	Summary	Moor 83'	Stadium: Rio Tinto Stadium; Attendance: 20,489; Referee: (United States) Mark Geiger

May 24, 2014 12	Colorado Rapids	4 - 1	Montreal Impact	Commerce City, Colorado, U.S.
7:00 pm MDT	Powers 5' (pen.) 84' Hill 54'; O'Neill 58' (yellow card) 90+2' Moor (yellow card) 72'	report	Lefevre (yellow card) 40'; Romero 88'	Stadium: Dick's Sporting Goods Park; Attendance: 17,616

June 1, 2014 13	Colorado Rapids	3 - 0	Houston Dynamo	Commerce City, Colorado, U.S.
6:00 pm MDT	Brown 5', 35'; Hill 51'	Report	Creavalle (yellow card) 40'	Stadium: Dick's Sporting Goods Park; Attendance: 17,470; Referee: Drew Fischer

June 4, 2014 14	Colorado Rapids	0 - 0	Chicago Fire	Commerce City, Colorado, U.S.
7:00 pm MDT	Watts (yellow card) 85'	Report	Joya (yellow card) 20'; Watson (yellow card) 78'	Stadium: Dick's Sporting Goods Park; Attendance: 13,402; Referee: (United States) Ricardo Salazar

June 7, 2014 15	FC Dallas	3 - 2	Colorado Rapids	Frisco, Texas, U.S.
7:30 pm CDT	Escobar 33' Loyd 45+2'; Luccin (yellow card) 49' Castillo 62'	Report	Serna (yellow card) 18' Brown 25'; José Marí 52' LaBrocca (yellow card) 76'	Stadium: Toyota Stadium; Attendance: 16,209; Referee: (United States) Kevin Stott

June 28, 2014 16	Colorado Rapids	2 - 0	Vancouver Whitecaps FC	Commerce City, Colorado, U.S.
7:00 pm MDT	Powers 20'; Sánchez 36' (pen.); LaBrocca (yellow card) 87'	Summary	Reo-Coker (yellow card) 54'	Stadium: Dick's Sporting Goods Park; Attendance: 14,978; Referee: (United States) Ted Unkel

July 4, 2014 17	Colorado Rapids	1 - 1	Columbus Crew	Commerce City, Colorado, U.S.
7:30 pm MDT	Moor (yellow card) 30'; Eric Gehrig (OG) 59'; Sanchez (yellow card) 79'; O'Neill (yellow card) 90+1'	Summary	Finlay 76'	Stadium: Dick's Sporting Goods Park; Attendance: 18,432; Referee: Geoff Gamble

July 12, 2014 18	Philadelphia Union	3 - 3	Colorado Rapids	Chester, Pennsylvania, U.S.
7:00 pm EDT	Casey 16'; Lahoud (yellow card) 29' (red card) 77'; Williams 31'; Wenger 74'; Okugo (red card) 90+4'	Summary	O'Neill (yellow card) 12'; Serna 18'; LaBrocca (yellow card) 34'; Powers 79' (pen.); Brown 87'	Stadium: PPL Park; Attendance: 18,679; Referee: (United States) Sorin Stoica

July 18, 2014 19	Portland Timbers	2 - 1	Colorado Rapids	Portland, Oregon, U.S.
8:00 pm PDT	O'Rourke (yellow card) 45'; Urruti 72'; Valeri 77'	Summary	Brown 16'; Powers (yellow card) 37'	Stadium: Providence Park; Attendance: 20,814; Referee: (United States) Ismail Elfath

July 26, 2014 20	Colorado Rapids	3–0	Chivas USA	Commerce City, Colorado, U.S.
7:00 pm MDT	LaBrocca 16'; Moor 26'; Torres 74'	Report; Box Score	Sturgis (yellow card) 36'	Stadium: Dick's Sporting Goods Park; Attendance: 14,652; Referee: (United States) Jair Marrufo

July 30, 2014 21	New England Revolution	3 - 0	Colorado Rapids	Foxborough, Massachusetts, U.S.
7:30 pm EDT	Nguyen 10' 75' Mullins (yellow card) 72' Rowe 78'	Summary	Piermayr (yellow card) 31' (red card) 74'; Irwin (yellow card) 74'	Stadium: Gillette Stadium; Attendance: 13,831; Referee: (United States) Juan Guzmán

August 2, 2014 22; Rocky Mountain Cup	Colorado Rapids	0 - 1	Real Salt Lake	Commerce City, Colorado, U.S.
7:00 PM MDT		Summary	Morales 14'; Wingert (yellow card) 34'; Maund (red card) 47'; Beckerman (yellow card) 62'; Beltran (yellow card) 84'	Stadium: Dick's Sporting Goods Park; Attendance: 17,554; Referee: (United States) Baldomero Toledo

August 9, 2014 23	FC Dallas	3 - 1	Colorado Rapids	Frisco, Texas, U.S.
8:00 pm CDT	Hedges 9'; Michel 11' (pen.) (yellow card) 87'; Castillo 55'; Moffat (yellow card) 71'; Akindele (yellow card) 74'	Report	LaBrocca (yellow card) 43'; Buddle (yellow card) 71'; José Mari (yellow card) 73'; Torres 86' (pen.)	Stadium: Toyota Stadium; Referee: (United States) Jose Rivero

August 17, 2014 24	D.C. United	4 - 2	Colorado Rapids	Washington, D.C., U.S.
8:00 pm EDT	Silva 12' 67'; Arnaud (yellow card) 68'; Kitchen (yellow card) 72'; Rolfe 81'; Espíndola 86'	Summary	LaBrocca (yellow card) 3'; Klute (yellow card) 43'; Serna 52'; Brown 90+1'	Stadium: RFK Stadium; Attendance: 12,814; Referee: (United States) Allen Chapman

August 20, 2014 25	Colorado Rapids	3 - 4	LA Galaxy	Commerce City, Colorado, U.S.
7:00 pm MDT	Hairston 14'; Buddle 17'; Burch 30'	Report; Box Score	Keane 20'; Gonzalez 55'; Gordon 68'; Donovan 80'; Sarvas (yellow card) 85'	Stadium: Dick's Sporting Goods Park; Attendance: 14,011; Referee: (United States) Ricardo Salazar

August 30, 2014 26	Seattle Sounders FC	1 - 0	Colorado Rapids	Seattle, Washington, U.S.
1:00 pm PDT	Evans (yellow card) 40' Dempsey 57' Scott (yellow card) 62'	[Report http://matchcenter.mlssoccer.com/matchcenter/2014-08-30-seattle-sounders-fc-vs-colorado-rapids/recap]	Piermayr (yellow card) 33'; Brown (yellow card) 84'	Stadium: CenturyLink Field; Attendance: 38,934; Referee: Hilario Grajeda

September 5, 2014 27	LA Galaxy	6 - 0	Colorado Rapids	Carson, California, U.S.
7:30 pm PDT	Donovan 5' (pen.) 47' (pen.) Husidic 30' 86' (yellow card) 30'; Zardes 45+2' 75' Ishizaki (yellow card) 50'		Nasco (red card) 1' Burch (yellow card) 57'; Piermayr (yellow card) 70' Hairston (yellow card) 84'	Stadium: StubHub Center; Attendance: 18,145; Referee: Baldomero Toledo

September 13, 2014 28	Colorado Rapids	2 - 2	Portland Timbers	Commerce City, Colorado, U.S.
7:00 pm MDT	Powers 48' (pen.); Brown 66'; Hill (yellow card) 73'; LaBrocca (yellow card) 90+1'	Report	Valeri 43' (yellow card) 67'; Fernández 76'	Stadium: Dick's Sporting Goods Park; Attendance: 15,984; Referee: (Canada) Drew Fischer

September 19, 2014 29; Rocky Mountain Cup	Real Salt Lake	5 - 1	Colorado Rapids	Sandy, Utah, U.S.
8:00 pm MDT	Plata 32'; Morales 33'; Schuler 37'; Nasco 45' (o.g.); Salcedo 63'	Report	José Mari 21'; O'Neill (yellow card) 36'; Serna (yellow card) 84'; Burch (yellow card) 88'	Stadium: Rio Tinto Stadium; Attendance: 20,692; Referee: (United States) Ricardo Salazar

September 27, 2014 30	Colorado Rapids	1 - 1	San Jose Earthquakes	Commerce City, Colorado, U.S.
7:00 pm MDT	O'Neill (yellow card) 11'; Wynne (yellow card) 74'; Torres 84'	Summary	Pintos (yellow card) 23'; Harris (yellow card) 90+1' (goal) 90+4'	Stadium: Dick's Sporting Goods Park; Attendance: 15,634; Referee: (United States) Juan Guzmán

October 5, 2014 31	Colorado Rapids	1 - 4	Seattle Sounders FC	Commerce City, Colorado, U.S.
1:00 pm MDT	Brown 43'; O'Neill (yellow card) 44'; LaBrocca (yellow card) 63'	Summary	Dempsey 11' (pen.); Evans (yellow card) 21'; Martins 28' 70'; Pappa 33' (yellow card) 75'	Stadium: Dick's Sporting Goods Park; Attendance: 17,609; Referee: (United States) Edwin Jurisevic

October 11, 2014 32	Chivas USA	2–1	Colorado Rapids	Carson, California, U.S.
7:30 pm PDT	Zavaleta (yellow card) 24'; Minda (yellow card) 42'; Kaji (yellow card) 44'; Tyrpak 65'; Borja 85'; Lochhead (yellow card) 90+2'	Report	José Mari (yellow card) 23'; Neeskens 30'	Stadium: StubHub Center; Attendance: 5,033; Referee: (United States) Chapman

October 18, 2014 33	Colorado Rapids	0–1	FC Dallas	Commerce City, Colorado, U.S.
1:00 pm MDT	Watts (yellow card) 56' (yellow-red card); Knight (yellow card) 65'	Report	Benítez (yellow card) 41'; Pérez 56' (pen.); Moffat (yellow card) 73'	Stadium: Dick's Sporting Goods Park; Attendance: 15,274; Referee: (United States) Grajeda

October 25, 2014 34	Vancouver Whitecaps FC	1–0	Colorado Rapids	Vancouver, British Columbia, Canada
7:00 pm PDT	Waston 70'; Harvey (yellow card) 87'		Torres (yellow card) 17'	Stadium: BC Place; Attendance: 21,000; Referee: (United States) Stott

=== U.S. Open Cup ===
June 17, 2014 4	Colorado Rapids	5–2	Orlando City SC	Commerce City, Colorado, U.S.
7:00 pm MDT	Brown 35', 47', 55' LaBrocca 42' Powers 73'	Report	Mbengue 23' (yellow card) 68'; Boden 71'	Stadium: Dick's Sporting Goods Park

June 24, 2014 5	Colorado Rapids	1–2	Atlanta Silverbacks	Commerce City, Colorado, U.S.
7:00 pm MDT	Burch (red card) 62'; Powers 75' (pen.); Piermayr (yellow card) 90+8'	Summary	Chavez 21' 57' (red card) 62'; Poku (red card) 62'; Carr (red card) 65'; Harlley (yellow card) 77'; Sandoval (yellow card) 83'	Stadium: Dick's Sporting Goods Park; Attendance: 1,654; Referee: (United States) Juan Guzmán

==== Standings ====
===== Western Conference standings =====
Pos	Team	Pld	W	L	T	GF	GA	GD	Pts	Qualification
1	Seattle Sounders FC	34	20	10	4	65	50	+15	64	Qualification for the conference semifinals
2	LA Galaxy	34	17	7	10	69	37	+32	61	Qualification for the conference semifinals
3	Real Salt Lake	34	15	8	11	54	39	+15	56	Qualification for the conference semifinals
4	FC Dallas	34	16	12	6	55	45	+10	54	Qualification for the knockout round
5	Vancouver Whitecaps FC	34	12	8	14	42	40	+2	50	Qualification for the knockout round
6	Portland Timbers	34	12	9	13	61	52	+9	49	
7	Chivas USA	34	9	19	6	29	61	−32	33	
8	Colorado Rapids	34	8	18	8	43	62	−19	32	
9	San Jose Earthquakes	34	6	16	12	35	50	−15	30	

Source: MLS

===== Overall table =====
Note: the table below has no impact on playoff qualification and is used solely for determining host of the MLS Cup, certain CCL spots, and 2015 MLS draft. The conference tables are the sole determinant for teams qualifying to the playoffs

Pos	Team	Pld	W	L	T	GF	GA	GD	Pts	Qualification
1	Seattle Sounders FC (S, U)	34	20	10	4	65	50	+15	64	Qualification for the CONCACAF Champions League
2	LA Galaxy (C)	34	17	7	10	69	37	+32	61	Qualification for the CONCACAF Champions League
3	D.C. United	34	17	9	8	52	37	+15	59	Qualification for the CONCACAF Champions League
4	Real Salt Lake	34	15	8	11	54	39	+15	56	Qualification for the CONCACAF Champions League
5	New England Revolution	34	17	13	4	51	46	+5	55	
6	FC Dallas	34	16	12	6	55	45	+10	54	
7	Columbus Crew	34	14	10	10	52	42	+10	52	
8	New York Red Bulls	34	13	10	11	55	50	+5	50	
9	Vancouver Whitecaps FC	34	12	8	14	42	40	+2	50	Qualification for the CONCACAF Champions League
10	Sporting Kansas City	34	14	13	7	48	41	+7	49	
11	Portland Timbers	34	12	9	13	61	52	+9	49	
12	Philadelphia Union	34	10	12	12	51	51	0	42	
13	Toronto FC	34	11	15	8	44	54	−10	41	
14	Houston Dynamo	34	11	17	6	39	58	−19	39	
15	Chicago Fire	34	6	10	18	41	51	−10	36	
16	Chivas USA	34	9	19	6	29	61	−32	33	
17	Colorado Rapids	34	8	18	8	43	62	−19	32	
18	San Jose Earthquakes	34	6	16	12	35	50	−15	30	
19	Montreal Impact (V)	34	6	18	10	38	58	−20	28	

Source: MLS
Rules for classification: 1) points; 2) head-to-head record; 3) goal difference; 4) number of goals scored
(C) MLS Cup champions; (S) Supporters' Shield winners; (U) U.S. Open Cup winners; (V) Canadian Championship winners

==== Results summary ====
Overall								Home						Away					
Pld	W	D	L	GF	GA	GD	Pts	W	D	L	GF	GA	GD	W	D	L	GF	GA	GD
31	8	7	16	42	58	−16	31	6	4	6	26	20	+6	2	3	10	16	38	−22

Last updated: 10 October 2014.
Source: Major League Soccer

==== Results by round ====
Round	1	2	3	4	5	6	7	8	9	10	11	12	13	14	15	16	17	18	19	20	21	22	23	24	25	26	27	28	29	30	31	32	33	34
Stadium	A	H	H	A	A	H	A	H	A	H	A	H	H	H	A	H	H	A	A	H	A	H	A	A	H	A	A	H	A	H	H	A	H	A
Result	D	W	L	W	W	D	L	W	D	L	L	W	W	D	L	W	D	D	L	W	L	L	L	L	L	L	L	D	L	D	L	L	L	L

Updated to match(es) played on 10 October 2014. Source: Colorado Rapids
A = Away; H = Home; W = Win; D = Draw; L = Loss

== Statistics ==
=== Top scorers ===
Rank	Pos	No.	Player	MLS	MLS Cup Playoffs	U.S. Open Cup	Total
1	FW	26	Deshorn Brown	10	0	3	13
2	MF	8	Dillon Powers	5	0	2	7
3	FW	7	Vicente Sánchez	6	0	0	6
4	MF	6	José Marí	4	0	0	4
5	MF	17	Dillon Serna	3	0	0	3
5	FW	10	Gabriel Torres	3	0	0	3
6	DF	3	Drew Moor	2	0	0	2
6	FW	9	Edson Buddle	2	0	0	2
6	MF	13	Kamani Hill	2	0	0	2
6	MF	2	Nick LaBrocca	1	0	1	2
7	DF	4	Marc Burch	1	0	0	1
7	MF	94	Marlon Hairston	1	0	0	1
7	DF	27	Shane O'Neill	1	0	0	1

=== Top assists ===
Rank	Pos	No.	Player	MLS	MLS Cup Playoffs	U.S. Open Cup	Total
1	MF	8	Dillon Powers	9	0	1	10
2	MF	17	Dillon Serna	4	0	0	4
2	DF	4	Marc Burch	3	0	1	4
4	MF	6	José Marí	1	0	1	2
5	MF	57	Carlos Alvarez	1	0	0	1
5	DF	15	Chris Klute	1	0	0	1
5	DF	3	Drew Moor	1	0	0	1
5	FW	9	Edson Buddle	1	0	0	1
5	FW	10	Gabriel Torres	1	0	0	1
5	MF	33	Jared Watts	1	0	0	1
5	MF	94	Marlon Hairston	1	0	0	1
5	DF	22	Marvell Wynne	1	0	0	1
5	MF	24	Nathan Sturgis	1	0	0	1
5	MF	2	Nick LaBrocca	1	0	0	1
5	FW	7	Vicente Sánchez	0	0	1	1

=== Goalkeeping ===
R	Player	Position	GAA	GA	Saves	GS	GP
1	(United States) Clint Irwin	GK	1.96	45	66	22	23
2	(United States) John Berner	GK	1.20	6	6	5	5
3	(United States) Joe Nasco	GK	2.32	7	13	4	4

=== Disciplinary record ===
Includes all competitive matches. The list is sorted by shirt number.

N	P	Nat.	Name	Major League Soccer			U.S. Open Cup			Playoffs			Others			Total			Notes
N	P	Nat.	Name	Yellow card	Second yellow card	Red card	Yellow card	Second yellow card	Red card	Yellow card	Second yellow card	Red card	Yellow card	Second yellow card	Red card	Yellow card	Second yellow card	Red card	Notes
1	GK	(United States)	Clint Irwin	2												2			
2	MF	(United States)	Nick LaBrocca	9												9			Suspended two games
3	DF	(United States)	Drew Moor	2												2			
4	DF	(United States)	Marc Burch	3												3			
5	DF	(United States)	Thomas Piermayr	4	1											4	1		Suspended one game
6	MF	(Spain)	José Marí	2	1		1									3	1		Suspended one game
7	FW	(Uruguay)	Vicente Sánchez	2												2			Suspended two games
8	MF	(United States)	Dillon Powers	2												2			
9	FW	(United States)	Edson Buddle	1												1			
10	FW	(Panama)	Gabriel Torres	1												1			
13	FW	(United States)	Kamani Hill	2												2			
15	DF	(United States)	Chris Klute	1												1			
17	MF	(United States)	Dillon Serna	2												2			Suspended one game
19	FW	(Cameroon)	Charles Eloundou	2												2			
22	DF	(United States)	Marvell Wynne	2	1											2	1		Suspended one game
23	GK	(United States)	Joe Nasco			1												1	Suspended one game
24	MF	(United States)	Nathan Sturgis	1												1			
26	FW	(Jamaica)	Deshorn Brown	2												2			
27	DF	(United States)	Shane O'Neill	6												6			Suspended one game
33	MF	(United States)	Jared Watts	1												1			
57	MF	(United States)	Carlos Alvarez																Suspended one game
94	MF	(United States)	Marlon Hairston	1												1			

Last updated: October 10, 2014
Source: Competitive matches
Ordered by (red card) , (second yellow card) and (yellow card)
(yellow card) = Number of bookings; (second yellow card) = Number of sending offs after a second yellow card; (red card) = Number of sending offs by a direct red card. Only competitive matches

Italic: denotes no longer with club.
