= Edson Buddle =

American soccer player (born 1981)

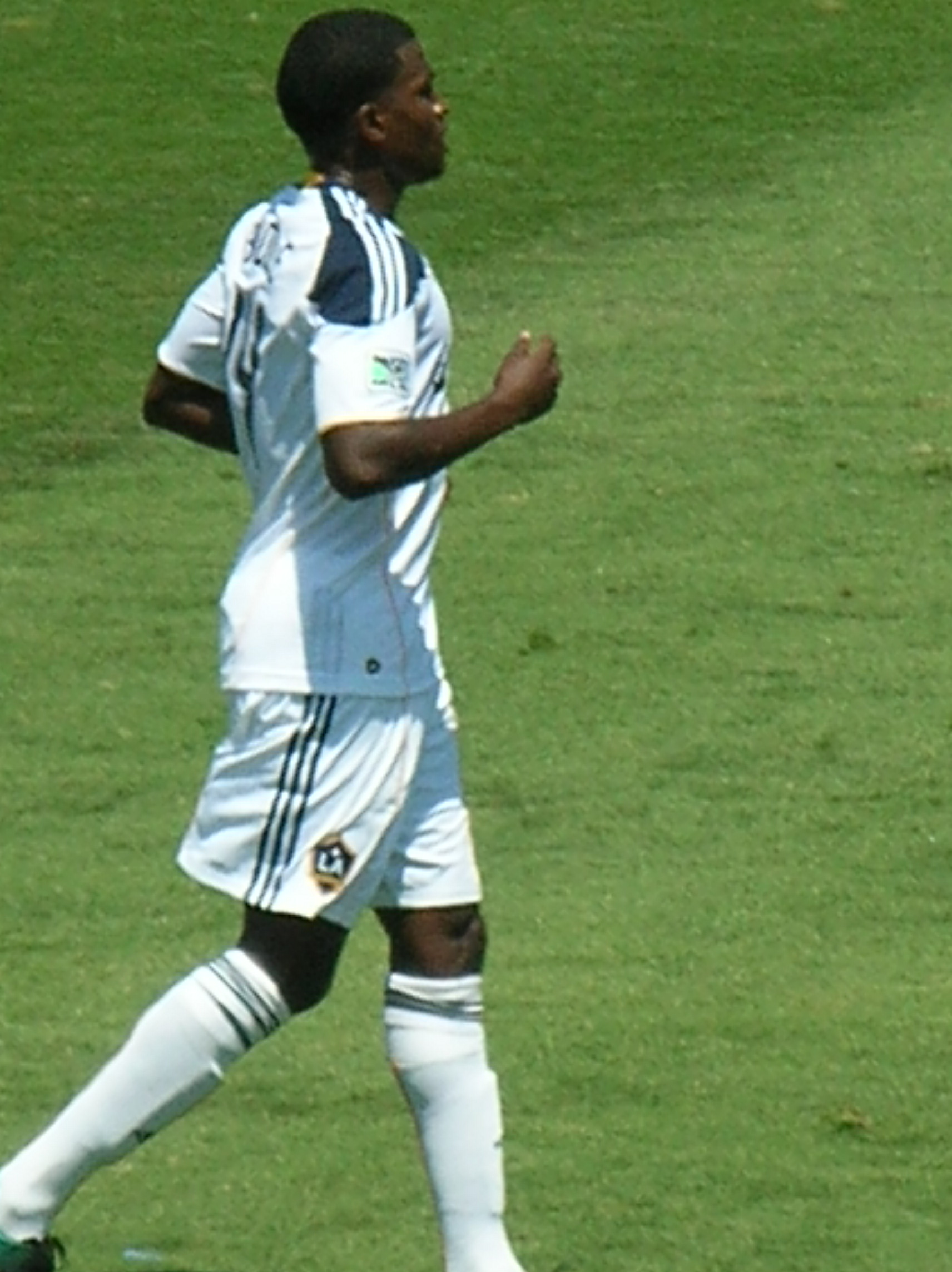
- Edson Buddle playing for the LA Galaxy in 2010

Personal information
- Full name: Edson Michael Buddle
- Date of birth: May 21, 1981 (age 45)
- Place of birth: New Rochelle, New York, U.S.
- Height: 6 ft 1 in (1.85 m)
- Position: Forward

Team information
- Current team: Westchester Flames (head coach)

Youth career
- 1993–1995: FC Westchester

College career
Years	Team	Apps	(Gls)
1999	State Fair Roadrunners		

Senior career*
Years	Team	Apps	(Gls)
2000	Long Island Rough Riders	26	(11)
2001–2005	Columbus Crew	106	(42)
2006	New York Red Bulls	28	(6)
2007	Toronto FC	10	(0)
2007–2010	LA Galaxy	87	(42)
2011–2012	Ingolstadt 04	31	(9)
2012	LA Galaxy	19	(3)
2013–2014	Colorado Rapids	42	(7)
2015	LA Galaxy	10	(0)
2015	→ LA Galaxy II (loan)	1	(0)
Total		360	(120)

International career
2001	United States U20	6	(2)
2002–2003	United States U23	4	(3)
2003–2012	United States	11	(3)

Managerial career
- 2020–: Westchester Flames
- * Club domestic league appearances and goals

Edson Michael Buddle (born May 21, 1981) is an American former professional soccer player who is currently the head coach of USL League Two side Westchester Flames. He is one of only 13 players to have scored 100 goals in Major League Soccer history.

A forward, Buddle began his career in North America in 2000 with the Long Island Rough Riders, who played in the A-League at that time. He then spent 2001 to 2010 in Major League Soccer, playing for the Columbus Crew, New York Red Bulls, Toronto FC, and LA Galaxy. After a one-year stint with FC Ingolstadt 04 in Germany's 2. Bundesliga he returned to Los Angeles. Buddle has also played for the United States national team, including two appearances at the 2010 FIFA World Cup.

== Club career ==
=== College and Minor-League Career ===
Born in New Rochelle, New York, Buddle played one year of college soccer at State Fair Community College, leading them to the 1999 NJCAA Division I National Championship which was later vacated due to using an illegal player. Buddle began his professional career in 2000, when he signed with Long Island Rough Riders of the A-League. Buddle helped the team win the Northeast Division, scoring eleven goals and four assists, and was a finalist for the A-League Rookie of the Year Award.

=== Columbus Crew ===
His performance in the A-League attracted the interest of MLS, and Edson was selected twenty-seventh overall in the 2001 MLS SuperDraft by Columbus Crew. Buddle played only 556 minutes in his first year, but scored three goals and two assists. The next year, at the age of twenty-one, he scored nine goals and five assists in only 1304 minutes while helping the Crew to a U.S. Open Cup win. Plagued by injuries, he only started sixteen games the next year, but scored nine goals and four assists. The pattern repeated itself in 2004, as Buddle missed significant time to injury, but still scored eleven goals and two assists in twenty starts. His 2005 totals were nine goals and two assists.

=== New York Red Bulls ===
Before the 2006 season Buddle was traded to New York Red Bulls for Eddie Gaven and Chris Leitch. He had a disappointing year in his tenure with the team only scoring six goals because he was battling a foot injury. On November 22, 2006, Buddle was traded to Toronto FC for Tim Regan. He failed to score in 10 appearances for the Reds but assisted on the club's first ever goal, setting up Danny Dichio to score against Chicago Fire in front of the south stand at BMO Field.

=== Los Angeles Galaxy ===
On June 13, 2007, Buddle was traded to LA Galaxy for Tyrone Marshall. He scored his first goal for the Galaxy against Real Salt Lake.

Buddle was not expected to be a starting striker as the 2008 MLS season began, as the Galaxy already had three attacking forwards in Carlos Ruiz, Landon Donovan and Alan Gordon. In spite of this, Buddle became a prominent striker on the LA offense in 2008, filling in for the injured Guatemalan striker Ruiz or when Donovan and Ruiz were absent while on international duty.

He scored two hat tricks during his first season in Los Angeles: one in Week 8 against FC Dallas and one in Week 12 against San Jose Earthquakes, winning the MLS Player of the Week in both weeks. After his second hat trick, teammate David Beckham commented, "Edson is an individual who is getting better at the game. He's proved that tonight." After scoring his ninth goal against Columbus Crew on June 22, 2008, coach Ruud Gullit said he had become a "true professional" and that he was "very pleased" with him. ESPN's Andrea Canales noted that Buddle had once suffered from a reputation of being "maddeningly lazy at times, giving up on passes that didn't fall in his striking-sweet zone," but that he had improved due to guidance from Beckham and an improved self-confidence as he scored more goals. MLS Extratime's Shep Messing said, "I don't think there's a better tandem up top than Landon Donovan and Edson Buddle...They complement each other. They don't take away each other's space, making it better for each other."

After scoring just five goals in the 2009 season, Buddle opened the 2010 season on fire, scoring seven goals in the first four matches of the year. By mid-May, he had scored nine times, earning a surprising call-up to the national team roster for the 2010 FIFA World Cup. He continued his strong form after returning from the World Cup, continuing to lead the league in scoring when the 2010 MLS All-Star Game rosters were announced despite having missed several matches on international duty. On October 24, 2010, Los Angeles Galaxy won the Western Conference and the Supporter's Shield, with Buddle winning the Galaxy's MVP, golden boot, and Humanitarian of the Year.

=== FC Ingolstadt 04 ===
Buddle signed with 2. Bundesliga club FC Ingolstadt 04 on January 10, 2011. He debuted for Ingolstadt on January 21 in a 1–1 draw against MSV Duisburg. He scored his first goal for the Bavarian side in the 78th minute of that game. Buddle was released by FC Ingolstadt 04 on January 31, 2012, making him a free agent.

=== Return to Los Angeles Galaxy and Colorado Rapids ===
Despite trialing with Everton the day after being released by Ingolstadt, Buddle re-signed with Los Angeles Galaxy. His second stint with the club proved disappointing and short-lived. Buddle started only 10 league games in 2012 and scored only 3 goals, his lowest season tally in MLS since his rookie year of 2001.

On December 14, 2012, Colorado Rapids acquired Buddle from Los Angeles in exchange for allocation money and a first-round pick in the 2013 MLS Supplemental Draft. On August 21, 2014, Buddle became only the eighth player to score 100 goals in MLS by heading in Dillon Powers' corner kick, albeit in a 3–4 home defeat to the Galaxy.

Buddle was released by Colorado on November 25, 2014. He returned to a third spell at the Galaxy on March 6, 2015. Buddle became a free agent on December 7, 2015, when the Galaxy declined his option.

== International career ==
Although he may have been a promising player for the United States national team, Buddle's injuries have made it difficult for him to break into the squad. He figured for the under-20 and under-23 teams, playing in the 2001 World Youth Championship with the former. Buddle earned his first senior team cap on March 29, 2003, in a friendly against Venezuela but would not see the field for the United States again for seven years. On May 11, 2010, he was named to the preliminary squad for the 2010 FIFA World Cup, and on May 25, started in a 4–2 friendly loss to the Czech Republic. The following day, Buddle was named to the final squad. Buddle contributed two first-half goals in a friendly match versus Australia on June 5. In the 2010 FIFA World Cup he appeared as a substitute in matches against England and Algeria.

== Career statistics ==
=== Club ===
Appearances and goals by club, season and competition
Club	Season	League			National cup (Note: Includes U.S. Open Cup, DFB-Pokal)		Continental		Other		Total	
Club	Season	Division	Apps	Goals	Apps	Goals	Apps	Goals	Apps	Goals	Apps	Goals
Long Island Rough Riders	2000	A-League	26	11	–		–		–		26	11
Columbus Crew	2001	Major League Soccer	17	3	2	0	0	0	2 (Note: Appearance(s) in MLS Cup playoffs)	0	21	3
Columbus Crew	2002	Major League Soccer	21	9	2	1	–		3	1	26	11
Columbus Crew	2003	Major League Soccer	21	10	1	2	0	0	–		22	12
Columbus Crew	2004	Major League Soccer	24	11	2	1	–		2	1	28	13
Columbus Crew	2005	Major League Soccer	23	9	1	0	–		–		24	9
Columbus Crew	Total		106	42	8	4	0	0	7	2	121	48
New York Red Bulls	2006	Major League Soccer	28	6	0	0	–		–		28	6
Toronto FC	2007	Major League Soccer	10	0	0	0	–		–		10	0
Los Angeles Galaxy	2007	Major League Soccer	16	5	1	0	0	0	–		17	5
Los Angeles Galaxy	2008	Major League Soccer	27	15	–		–		–		27	15
Los Angeles Galaxy	2009	Major League Soccer	19	5	–		–		4	0	23	5
Los Angeles Galaxy	2010	Major League Soccer	25	17	0	0	2 (Note: Appearances in CONCACAF Champions League)	0	3	2	30	19
Los Angeles Galaxy	Total		87	42	1	0	2	0	7	2	97	44
Ingolstadt 04	2010–11	2. Bundesliga	14	3	–		–		–		14	3
Ingolstadt 04	2011–12	2. Bundesliga	17	6	2	0	–		–		19	6
Ingolstadt 04	Total		31	9	2	0	–		–		33	9
Los Angeles Galaxy	2012	Major League Soccer	19	3	0	0	4	0	5	0	28	3
Colorado Rapids	2013	Major League Soccer	24	5	0	0	–		1	0	25	5
Colorado Rapids	2014	Major League Soccer	18	2	0	0	–		–		18	2
Colorado Rapids	Total		42	7	0	0	–		1	0	43	7
LA Galaxy	2015	Major League Soccer	12	0	0	0	0	0	0	0	12	0
Career total			349	120	11	4	6	0	20	4	386	128

=== International ===
As of December 15, 2014.

National team	Year	Apps	Goals
United States
United States	2003	1	0
United States	2010	5	2
United States	2011	4	1
United States	2012	1	0
Total		11	3

International goals

#	Date	Venue	Opponent	Score	Result	Competition
1.	June 5, 2010	Ruimsig Stadium, Roodepoort, South Africa	Australia	1–0	3–1	Friendly
2.	June 5, 2010	Ruimsig Stadium, Roodepoort, South Africa	Australia	2–1	3–1	Friendly
3.	November 15, 2011	Stožice Stadium, Ljubljana, Slovenia	Slovenia	1–0	3–2	Friendly

== Personal life ==
Buddle is named after Edson Arantes do Nascimento, better known as Pelé. His father, Winston Buddle, a former professional soccer player born in Jamaica, chose the name. Buddle attended Port Chester High School in Westchester County, New York.

== Honors ==
Columbus Crew

- Supporters' Shield: 2004
- Lamar Hunt U.S. Open Cup: 2002

LA Galaxy

- MLS Cup: 2012
- Supporters' Shield: 2010
- Western Conference
  - Regular Season: 2009, 2010
  - Playoffs: 2012

Individual

- Los Angeles Galaxy MVP: 2010
- Los Angeles Galaxy Golden Boot: 2010
- Los Angeles Galaxy Humanitarian of the Year: 2010
- MLS Player of the Month: August 2002, April 2010
- MLS Best XI: 2010
- MLS 100 goals club
