= Deshorn Brown =

Jamaican footballer (born 1990)

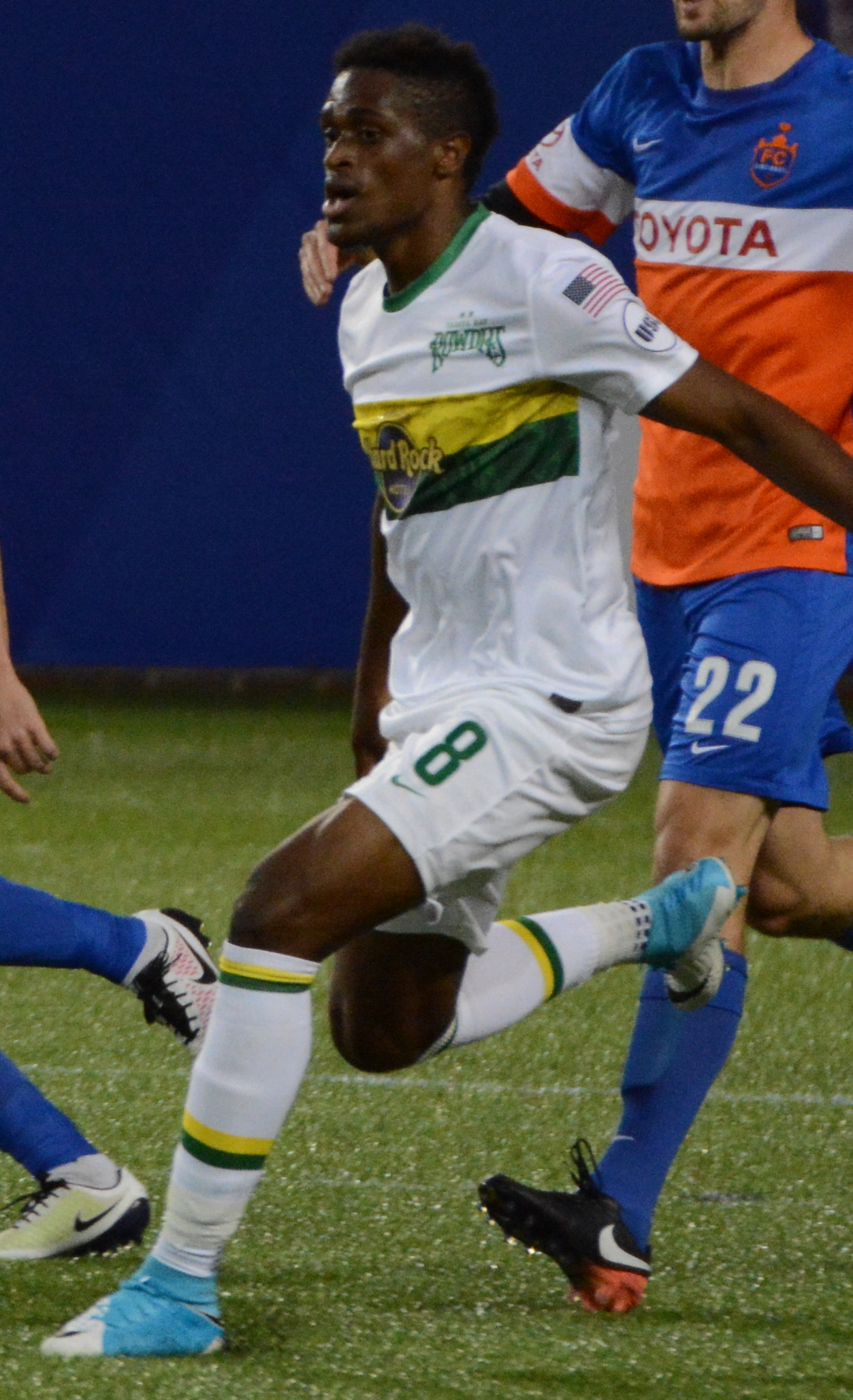
- Brown with Tampa Bay Rowdies in 2017

Personal information
- Full name: Deshorn Dwayne Brown
- Date of birth: 22 December 1990 (age 35)
- Place of birth: Manchester, Jamaica
- Height: 1.88 m (6 ft 2 in)
- Position: Striker

College career
Years	Team	Apps	(Gls)
2010–2011	Mobile Rams	43	(53)
2012	UCF Knights	16	(13)

Senior career*
Years	Team	Apps	(Gls)
2011	Des Moines Menace	10	(9)
2012	Reading United	13	(13)
2013–2015	Colorado Rapids	62	(20)
2015–2016	Vålerenga	37	(13)
2016	Shenzhen FC	14	(7)
2017	Tampa Bay Rowdies	14	(3)
2017	D.C. United	16	(2)
2018	Lorca	12	(1)
2018–2019	Oklahoma City Energy	34	(16)
2019–2021	Bengaluru	17	(3)
2021–2022	NorthEast United	22	(12)
2022	Sacramento Republic	12	(1)
2023	Nongbua Pitchaya	2	(0)

International career^{‡}
2013–2015	Jamaica	14	(2)
- * Club domestic league appearances and goals as of 1 January 2024 ‡ National team caps and goals as of 13 October 2015

Deshorn Dwayne Brown (born 22 December 1990) is a Jamaican professional footballer who plays as a forward.

== Club career ==
=== Early and collegiate ===
A native of Jamaica, Brown attended St. Elizabeth Technical High School. He then moved to the United States to attend the University of Mobile in Alabama. After his sophomore year, he transferred to the University of Central Florida. In 2013, he elected to forgo his senior year to enter the MLS SuperDraft.

=== Professional ===
Brown was selected by the Colorado Rapids with the sixth overall pick (first round) of the 2013 MLS SuperDraft on 17 January 2013. He scored his first professional goal on 16 March 2013 in a game against the Real Salt Lake. The goal came in the 37th minute and the game resulted in a 1–1 tie.

During the 2013 season, Brown achieved many accomplishments. He earned the 2013 Rapids Golden Boot award leading the team with 10 goals and also lead all MLS rookies in scoring as well, just one shy of the MLS rookie scoring record. Brown finished second behind teammate Dillon Powers for MLS Rookie of the Year. He also scored the third-fastest goal in MLS history after just 15 seconds in the 5–1 win against Seattle on 5 October.

Brown was sold to Norwegian side Vålerenga on 17 March 2015. Brown scored his first goal and his second goal on 17 April 2015 in a game against the Haugesund. The goals came in the 35th and 36th minutes and the game resulted in a 2 – 0 win.

Brown was sold to China League One side Shenzhen FC on 6 July 2016 for a fee of around $1.2 million. He scored a hat-trick in his debut against Shanghai Shenxin F.C.

Brown moved from the Tampa Bay Rowdies to D.C. United on 20 June 2017 after the Houston Dynamo traded away their spot in the Major League Soccer allocation order. Brown made his debut for United the next day on 21 June 2017, against Atlanta United. He came on in the 62nd minute for José Guillermo Ortiz. He scored his first goal for United against FC Dallas on 4 July 2017.

On 28 November 2017 his contract option with United was declined. In January 2018, Brown signed with Lorca FC in Spain. On 18 September 2018, it was announced that Brown had again returned to the United States, joining USL side OKC Energy FC.

=== Bengaluru ===
On 1 January 2020, Brown joined reigning Indian Super League Champions Bengaluru FC on a one-and-a-half-year deal through the end of the 2020–21 season.

=== NorthEast United ===
On 15 January 2021, Brown was signed by NorthEast United. Brown scored 5 goals in 10 Match for the Highlanders in 2021–22 season. On 14 September 2021, NorthEast United and Deshorn Brown have agreed a one-year contract extension for the upcoming season.

He began the 2021–22 season campaign with a goal against Bengaluru FC on 20 November, in a 4–2 defeat. He scored a hat-trick against Mumbai City on 27 December in a 3–3 draw. He played two season for Highlanders and made a total of 22 appearances and scored 12 goals for the club.

== International career ==
Deshorn received his first call-up to Jamaica senior national on 7 October 2013 after scoring what was at the time the second fastest goal in MLS history. Brown scored his first international goal against Barbados on 2 March 2014.

== Career statistics ==
=== Club ===
As of 28 February 2022

Club	Season	League			Cup		Continental		Total	
Club	Season	Division	Apps	Goals	Apps	Goals	Apps	Goals	Apps	Goals
Des Moines Menace	2011	USL PDL	10	9	1	0	—		11	9
Reading United	2012	USL PDL	13	13	1	0	—		14	13
Colorado Rapids	2013	MLS	32	10	1	0	—		33	10
Colorado Rapids	2014	MLS	30	10	2	3	—		32	13
Colorado Rapids	2015	MLS	1	0	0	0	—		1	0
Colorado Rapids	Total		62	20	3	3	—		66	23
Vålerenga	2015	Tippeligaen	23	7	0	0	—		23	7
Vålerenga	2016	Tippeligaen	14	6	3	4	—		17	10
Vålerenga	Total		37	13	3	4	—		40	17
Shenzhen FC	2016	China League One	14	7	0	0	—		14	7
Tampa Bay Rowdies	2017	USL	14	3	1	0	—		15	3
D.C. United	2017	MLS	16	2	0	0	—		16	2
Lorca	2017–18	Segunda División	12	1	0	0	—		12	1
OKC Energy	2018	USL	4	1	0	0	—		4	1
Bengaluru	2019–20	Indian Super League	7	3	—		3 (Note: Appearances in 2020 AFC Cup)	4	10	7
Bengaluru	2020–21	Indian Super League	10	0	—		—		10	0
Bengaluru	Total		17	3	—		3	4	20	7
NorthEast United	2020–21	Indian Super League	10	5	—		—		10	5
NorthEast United	2021–22	Indian Super League	12	7	—		—		12	7
NorthEast United	Total		22	12	—		—		22	12
Career total			202	79	9	7	3	4	215	90

=== International ===
As of 13 October 2015

Appearances and goals by national team, year and competition
Team	Year	Competitive		Friendly		Total	
Team	Year	Apps	Goals	Apps	Goals	Apps	Goals
Jamaica	2013	2	0	2	0	4	0
Jamaica	2014	1	0	3	2	4	2
Jamaica	2015	5	0	1	0	6	0
Career total		8	0	6	2	14	2

List of international goals scored by Deshorn Brown
#	Date	Venue	Opponent	Score	Result	Competition	Source
1.	2 March 2014	Barbados National Stadium, Saint Michael, Barbados	Barbados	2–0	2–0	Friendly	
2.	5 March 2014	Beausejour Cricket Ground, Gros Islet, St. Lucia	Saint Lucia	5–0	5–0	Friendly	

== Honours ==
Jamaica

- Caribbean Cup: 2014
