= Shane O'Neill (soccer) =

American soccer player (born 1993)

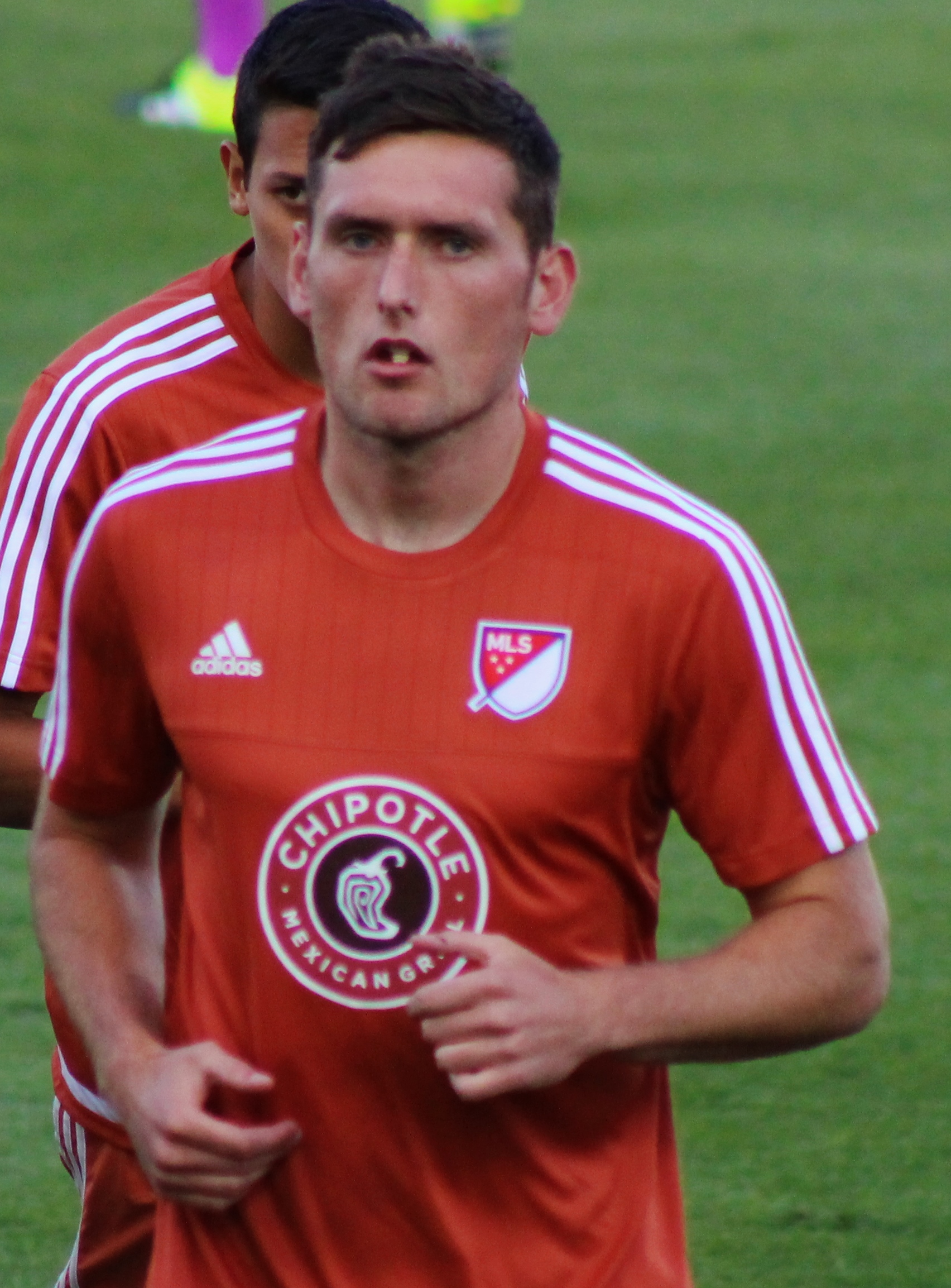
- O'Neill in 2015

Personal information
- Full name: Shane Edward O'Neill
- Date of birth: September 2, 1993 (age 33)
- Place of birth: Midleton, County Cork, Ireland
- Height: 6 ft 2 in (1.88 m)
- Position: Center-back

Youth career
- 2009–2012: Colorado Rapids

Senior career*
Years	Team	Apps	(Gls)
2012–2015	Colorado Rapids	52	(1)
2015–2017	Apollon Limassol	0	(0)
2015	→ Royal Excel Mouscron (loan)	0	(0)
2016	→ Cambridge United (loan)	2	(0)
2016–2017	→ NAC Breda (loan)	25	(1)
2017–2018	Excelsior	1	(0)
2018–2019	Orlando City SC	24	(0)
2020–2021	Seattle Sounders FC	45	(1)
2022–2024	Toronto FC	60	(0)
2025	Radnički 1923	3	(0)

International career^{‡}
2012–2013	United States U20	12	(2)
2014–2016	United States U23	9	(0)
Medal record
Representing United States
Runner-up	CONCACAF U-20 Championship	2013
- * Club domestic league appearances and goals as of February 11, 2025 ‡ National team caps and goals as of February 10, 2017

Shane Edward O'Neill (born September 2, 1993) is a professional soccer player who plays as a center-back. Born in Ireland, he represented the United States at international level.

== Club career ==
=== Colorado Rapids ===
O'Neill joined the U.S. Soccer Development Academy with the Colorado Rapids youth system in 2009. He led the Rapids U18 team in scoring in 2011–12 with 10 goals in 15 games, helping them reach the playoffs.

O'Neill originally signed to play college soccer at the University of Virginia, however on June 19, 2012, O'Neill signed with the Colorado Rapids as a homegrown player. Three months later, he made his professional debut in a 3–0 victory over the Portland Timbers, coming on as an 86th-minute substitute for Jeff Larentowicz. O'Neill became a regular starter in 2013 and received strong reviews, earning the Rapids' Young Player of the Year award and a nomination for U.S. Soccer Young Athlete of the Year as the Rapids returned to the playoffs. His first career goal came in a 4–1 home win over Montreal Impact on May 25, 2014.

=== Apollon Limassol ===
On August 7, 2015, O'Neill was bought by Cypriot club Apollon Limassol for an undisclosed fee. On August 31, 2015, he was loaned out to Royal Mouscron-Péruwelz in Belgium. The loan was cut short on December 23, 2015, and he returned to Limassol having not made an appearance for the Belgian club. He had subsequent loan spells with League 2 side Cambridge United and NAC Breda in Jupiler League, never featuring for Apollon Limassol.

=== Excelsior ===
O'Neill joined Excelsior on a one-year deal for the 2017–18 season.

=== Orlando City ===
In June 2018, O'Neill returned to MLS when he signed a three-and-a-half-year contract with Orlando City SC. He made his debut in a U.S. Open Cup quarterfinal defeat to Philadelphia Union on July 18 and made his MLS debut for the club three days later at Columbus. On November 21, 2019, it was announced O'Neill had his contract option for the 2020 season declined by Orlando as part of the end-of-season roster decisions.

=== Seattle Sounders FC ===
On January 14, 2020, O'Neill signed with Seattle Sounders FC. O'Neill made his Sounders debut on February 20 coming in as a substitute against CD Olimpia in the Concacaf Champions League. He scored his first goal for the club in the 2020 MLS Cup Playoffs on December 1 against FC Dallas.

=== Toronto FC ===
On December 22, 2021, O'Neill signed a three-year contract, beginning in 2022, as a free agent with Toronto FC. He made his debut on February 26 in the season opener against FC Dallas, as a substitute.

=== Radnički 1923 Kragujevac ===
On February 13, 2025, O'Neill signed with Radnički 1923. He made his debut on February 27, 2025, against Novi Pazar.

== International career ==
O'Neill is eligible to represent both the United States and the Republic of Ireland. On October 9, 2012, O'Neill was called up by the United States U20 national team for the 2012 Marbella Cup in Spain. A day later, O'Neill made his debut for the U20s in a 2–1 loss to Canada, however he suffered an eye injury that ruled him out for the rest of the tournament. He later played for the U.S. at the 2013 FIFA U-20 World Cup.

He has yet to debut for the U.S. senior team and has indicated a willingness to accept a call for his native Ireland. He participated in a U.S. camp in January 2014, although he was dropped prior to a friendly against South Korea. He was called up to the United States senior squad for a friendly against Panama in February 2015.

== Personal life ==
O'Neill is the son of former All-Ireland winning Cork Gaelic footballer, Colm O'Neill, and is a nephew of former Kerry Gaelic footballer, Maurice Fitzgerald. O'Neill is the younger brother of Darragh O'Neill, a former punter for Colorado Buffaloes football team. He is the older brother of Vancouver Whitecaps defender Mark O'Neill. His cousin Ronan Teahan is a fellow professional footballer.

O'Neill's family immigrated to the United States from Ireland when he was a toddler after his father won a green card through the Diversity Immigrant Visa lottery program.

O'Neill grew up in Boulder, Colorado and attended Fairview High School. In his senior year of high school, O'Neill was named the Colorado's player of the year by Gatorade and selected to the All-Colorado boys soccer team. O'Neill played basketball in high school and was named to the second-team all-5A team for his performances during his senior year. Although he committed to the University of Virginia, O'Neill ultimately signed with his hometown team the Colorado Rapids at the age of 18.

== Career statistics ==
As of match played March 29, 2025

Appearances and goals by club, season and competition
Club	Season	League			Playoffs		National cup		Continental		Other		Total	
Club	Season	Division	Apps	Goals	Apps	Goals	Apps	Goals	Apps	Goals	Apps	Goals	Apps	Goals
Colorado Rapids	2012	MLS	1	0	—		0	0	—		—		1	0
Colorado Rapids	2013	MLS	26	0	1	0	1	0	—		—		28	0
Colorado Rapids	2014	MLS	21	1	—		2	0	—		—		23	1
Colorado Rapids	2015	MLS	4	0	—		2	0	—		—		6	0
Colorado Rapids	Total		52	1	1	0	5	0	0	0	0	0	58	1
Apollon Limassol	2015–16	Cypriot First Division	—		—		—		—		—		0	0
Royal Excel Mouscron (loan)	2015–16	Belgian Pro League	0	0	—		0	0	—		—		0	0
Cambridge United (loan)	2015–16	League Two	2	0	—		—		—		—		2	0
NAC Breda (loan)	2016–17	Eerste Divisie	25	1	4	0	0	0	—		—		29	1
Excelsior	2017–18	Eredivisie	1	0	—		1	0	—		—		2	0
Orlando City SC	2018	MLS	13	0	—		1	0	—		—		14	0
Orlando City SC	2019	MLS	11	0	—		1	0	—		—		12	0
Orlando City SC	Total		24	0	0	0	2	0	0	0	0	0	26	0
Seattle Sounders FC	2020	MLS	18	0	4	1	—		2	0	—		24	1
Seattle Sounders FC	2021	MLS	27	0	1	0	—		3	0	—		31	0
Seattle Sounders FC	Total		45	0	5	1	0	0	5	0	0	0	55	1
Toronto FC	2022	MLS	26	0	—		3	0	—		—		29	0
Toronto FC	2023	MLS	14	0	—		0	0	—		1	0	15	0
Toronto FC	2024	MLS	20	0	—		2	0	—		2	0	24	0
Toronto FC	Total		60	0	0	0	5	0	0	0	3	0	68	0
Radnički 1923 Kragujevac	2025	Serbian SuperLiga	3	0	—		0	0	—		—		3	0
Career total			212	2	10	1	13	0	5	0	3	0	242	3
