= Dillon Powers =

American soccer player (born 1991)

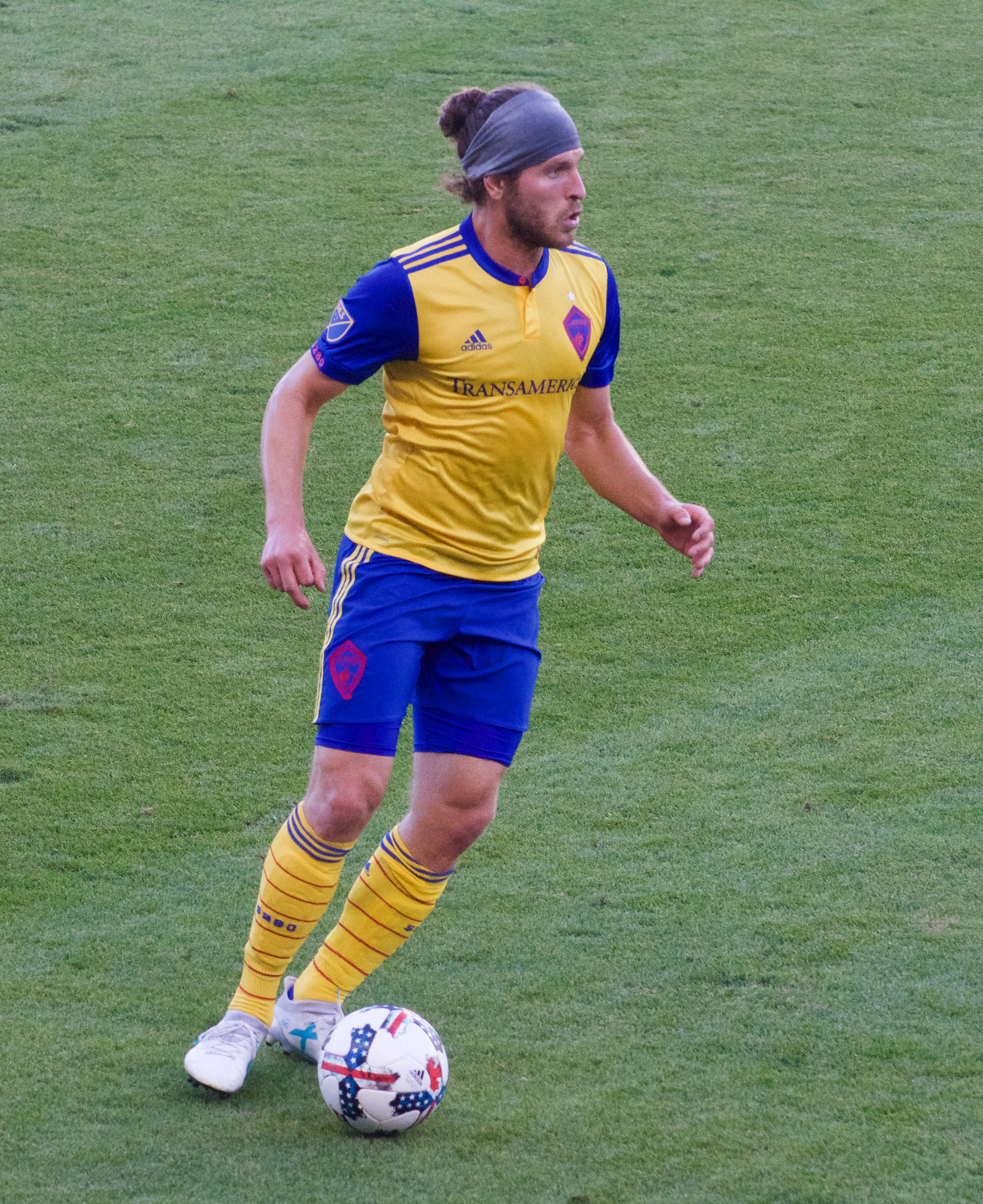
- Dillon Powers playing for Colorado Rapids in 2017

Personal information
- Full name: Dillon Thomas Powers
- Date of birth: February 14, 1991 (age 35)
- Place of birth: Plano, Texas, United States
- Height: 5 ft 11 in (1.80 m)
- Position: Midfielder

Team information
- Current team: Orange County SC
- Number: 5

Youth career
- 2008–2009: Andromeda SC

College career
Years	Team	Apps	(Gls)
2009–2012	Notre Dame	78	(10)

Senior career*
Years	Team	Apps	(Gls)
2012	Austin Aztex	2	(0)
2013–2017	Colorado Rapids	136	(14)
2017–2019	Orlando City	16	(0)
2020–2021	Dundee United	22	(1)
2021	Orange County SC	14	(0)
2022	Glentoran	10	(0)
2022–	Orange County SC	63	(1)

International career^{‡}
2009	United States U18	3	(1)
2009–2011	United States U20	15	(0)
- * Club domestic league appearances and goals as of November 14, 2024 ‡ National team caps and goals as of March 30, 2013

Dillon Thomas Powers (born February 14, 1991) is an American soccer player who plays as a midfielder for USL Championship side Orange County SC. He played in Major League Soccer for Colorado Rapids and Orlando City before moving to Dundee United in Scotland and Glentoran in Northern Ireland.

== Early career ==
Powers was born in Plano, Texas. As a youngster, Powers played for hometown club Andromeda SC and Plano Senior High School. He was named the Gatorade National Boys Soccer Player of the Year in his senior year before going on to play for Notre Dame.

=== College career ===
Powers played college soccer for the Fighting Irish at the University of Notre Dame from 2009 to 2012. For the 2009 season, he was named to the Big East All-Rookie Team. In 2010 and 2011, he was named to the All-Big East second team.

For the 2012 season, he was selected to the All-Big East first team and the NSCAA All-America First Team. He finished his Notre Dame career with 10 goals and 22 assists in 78 career games.

== Club career ==
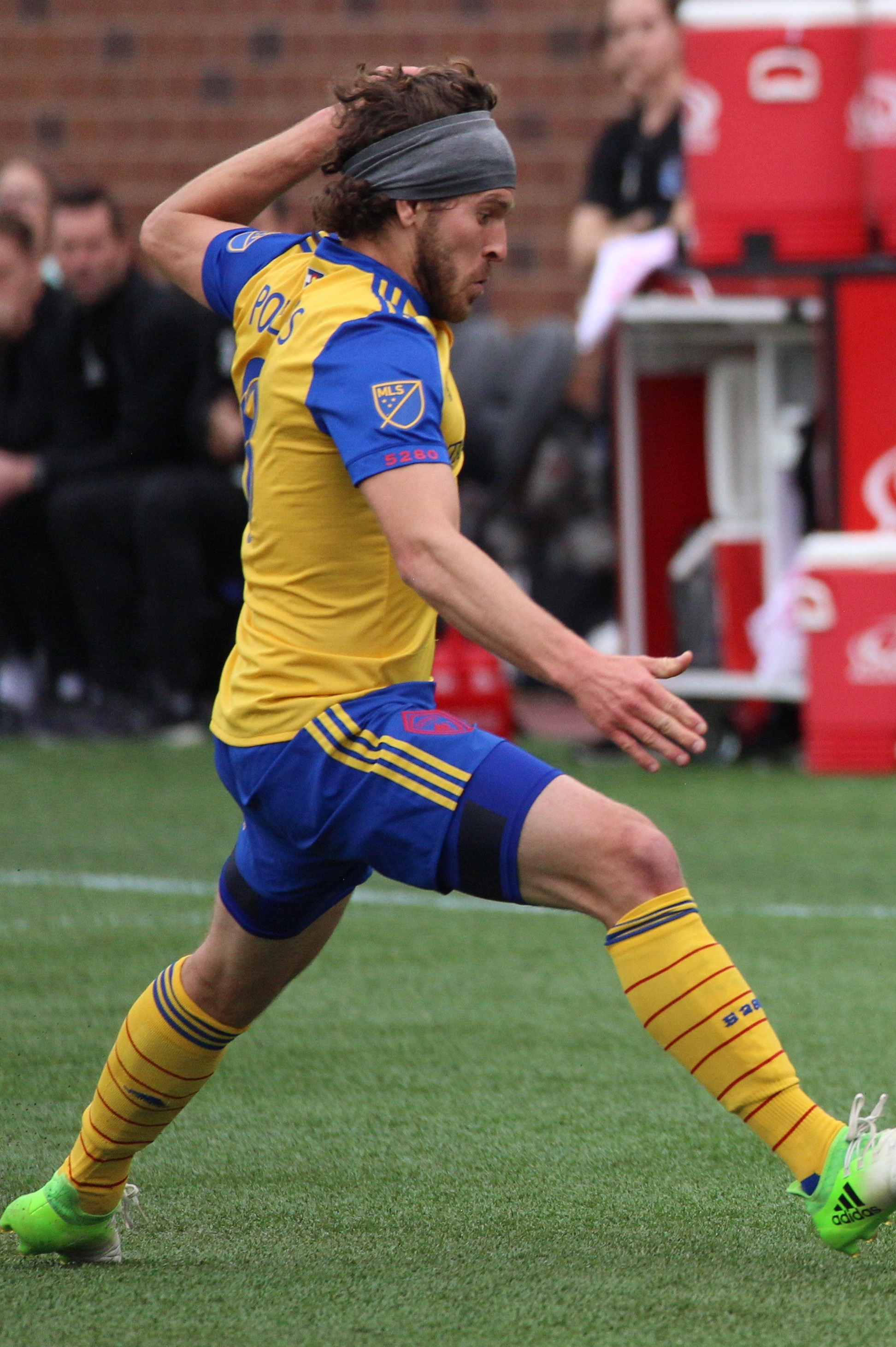
Powers in 2017

After college, Powers was drafted eleventh overall in the 2013 MLS SuperDraft by the Colorado Rapids. He became an instant hit with the team and was often shortlisted for the MLS Rookie of the Year Award by several pundits. After the conclusion of the Rapids' season, Powers won the Rookie of the Year award, beating out teammate Deshorn Brown.

On November 8, 2015, it was revealed the Powers was on trial with English Championship side, Reading.

On August 10, 2017, it was announced that Powers had been traded to Orlando City in exchange for Luis Gil and $100,000 of Targeted Allocation Money. Powers made his debut for Orlando City on August 26, 2017, against Vancouver Whitecaps FC.

He re-signed with Orlando City on December 18, 2017. Powers scored his only goal for Orlando City on June 6, 2018, in a 2018 U.S. Open Cup match against Miami United FC.

On November 21, 2019, it was announced Powers had his contract option for the 2020 season declined by Orlando as part of the end-of-season roster decisions. Following his release from Orlando at the end of their 2019 season, Powers made the move to Scottish Championship club Dundee United on January 10, 2020, on a deal lasting until the summer of 2021.

Powers made his Scottish Premiership debut as a substitute in the 76th minute of a 1–0 win against Motherwell. He left Dundee United following the expiry of his contract at the end of the 2020–21 season. On August 12, 2021, Powers signed with Orange County SC in the US 2nd tier USL Championship.

On March 2, 2022, Powers made the move to NIFL Premiership team Glentoran. Following the 2022 season, Glentoran announced that Powers had opted to leave Belfast and return to the United States. On June 30, 2022, Powers re-signed with Orange County SC.

== International career ==
Powers represented the United States on several occasions at the youth level. He played for the US U18 and was a part of the US U20 team at the 2009 FIFA U-20 World Cup.

== Personal life ==
Dillon is the son of Michael Powers, who played for 15 years in the Major Indoor Soccer League with the Dallas Sidekicks. Powers acquired an Italian passport in early 2015 making him a dual citizen of both the US and Italy.

== Career statistics ==
=== Club ===
As of match played February 6, 2021

Appearances and goals by club, season and competition
Club	Season	League			National Cup		League Cup		Other		Total	
Club	Season	Division	Apps	Goals	Apps	Goals	Apps	Goals	Apps	Goals	Apps	Goals
Colorado Rapids	2013	MLS	30	5	1	0	—		—		31	5
Colorado Rapids	2014	MLS	30	5	2	2	—		—		32	7
Colorado Rapids	2015	MLS	32	3	1	0	—		—		33	3
Colorado Rapids	2016	MLS	29	1	2	0	—		3 (Note: Appearances in MLS Cup)	0	34	1
Colorado Rapids	2017	MLS	15	0	2	0	—		—		17	0
Colorado Rapids	Total		136	14	8	2	0	0	3	0	147	16
Orlando City	2017	MLS	6	0	0	0	—		—		6	0
Orlando City	2018	MLS	3	0	2	1	—		—		5	1
Orlando City	2019	MLS	7	0	3	0	—		—		10	0
Orlando City	Total		16	0	5	1	0	0	0	0	21	1
Dundee United	2019–20	Scottish Championship	8	1	2	0	0	0	0	0	9	1
Dundee United	2020–21	Scottish Premiership	14	0	0	0	3	0	—		17	0
Dundee United	Total		22	1	2	0	3	0	0	0	26	1
Career total			172	15	15	3	3	0	3	0	193	18

== Honors ==
Dundee United

- Scottish Championship: 2019–20

Individual

- MLS Rookie of the Year: 2013
