= Germán Mera =

Colombian footballer (born 1990)

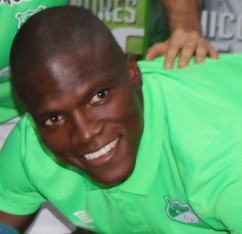
- Mera with Deportivo Cali

Personal information
- Full name: Germán Mera Cáceres
- Date of birth: March 5, 1990 (age 36)
- Place of birth: Cali, Colombia
- Height: 1.87 m (6 ft 2 in)
- Position: Centre back

Youth career
- Deportivo Cali

Senior career*
| Years | Team | Apps | (Gls) |
| 2008–2017 | Deportivo Cali | 151 | (9) |
| 2008 | → Córdoba (loan) | 16 | (0) |
| 2009 | → Atlético La Sabana (loan) | 40 | (5) |
| 2010 | → Deportivo Pasto (loan) | 30 | (2) |
| 2013 | → Colorado Rapids (loan) | 21 | (0) |
| 2014 | → Bucaramanga (loan) | 14 | (0) |
| 2017-2018 | Club Brugge | 2 | (0) |
| 2018-2019 | KV Mechelen | 31 | (4) |
| 2019–2022 | Atlético Junior | 21 | (2) |
| 2022–2023 | Deportivo Cali | 49 | (0) |
| 2024 | Cienciano | 23 | (2) |
- * Club domestic league appearances and goals as of 31 October 2024

Germán Mera Cáceres (born March 5, 1990) is a Colombian professional footballer who plays as a centre-back.

== Club Brugge KV ==
After several years as a regular starter at Deportivo Cali, Germán Mera decided to try his luck in Europe, where he signed with the Belgian top club Club Brugge KV. However, at Club Brugge, there was a lot of competition and Mera barely played. In half a season, he only made two appearances.

== KV Mechelen ==
Germán Mera joined KV Mechelen on a permanent transfer in January 2018 from Club Brugge, where he struggled to find playing time. Normally a stable mid-table team, KV Mechelen found themselves in the relegation zone at the time of his arrival. Unfortunately, in his first few matches, Mera did not make a good impression, and the team was relegated to the second division.

However, in his second season, under new coach Wouter Vrancken, Mera became a defensive anchor, helping the team even set a new record for the longest unbeaten defense in the second division (464 minutes). Additionally, Mera's impressive physical abilities made him a deadly threat on set pieces, as he scored several times with his head.

At the end of the season, KV Mechelen was promoted back to the first division. That same year, KV Mechelen also won the Belgian Cup, an exceptional achievement for a second division team. In the cup final, Mera scored the winning goal, securing his place in the team's history.

In the summer of 2019, Mera returned to Colombia, but he left KV Mechelen as a fan favorite. Despite his initial struggles, he became a crucial player in the team's success, and his performances helped inspire the team to their incredible achievements in the 2018–2019 season.

== Honours ==
Deportivo Cali

- Categoría Primera A: 2015-I

Mechelen

- Belgian Cup: 2018–19

Atlético Junior

- Superliga Colombiana: 2020 Superliga Colombiana.
