= Kamani Hill =

American soccer player (born 1985)

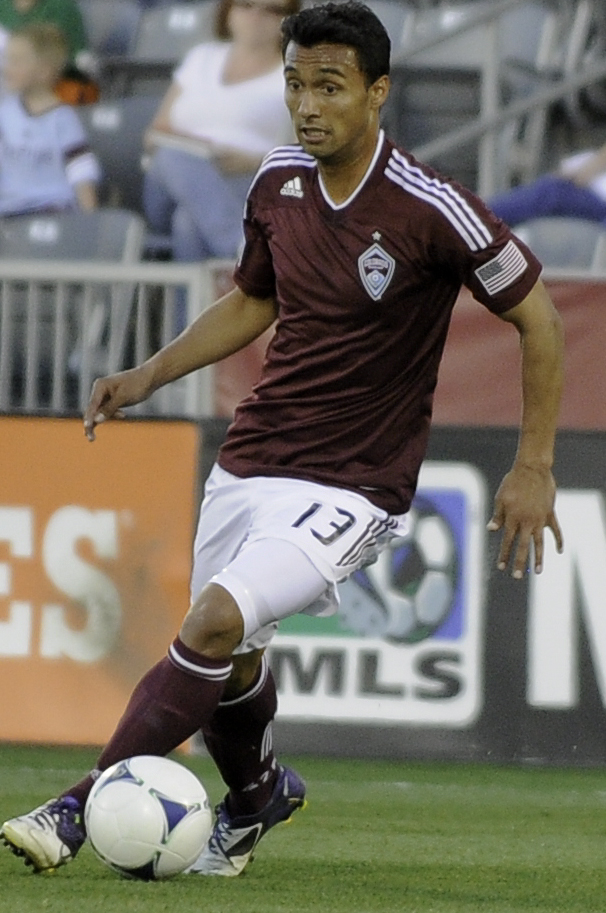
- Hill in 2012

Personal information
- Full name: Kamani Helekunihi Hill
- Date of birth: December 28, 1985 (age 40)
- Place of birth: Berkeley, California, United States
- Height: 6 ft 0 in (1.83 m)
- Positions: Forward; winger

Youth career
- Marin United
- 2004–2006: UCLA Bruins

Senior career*
Years	Team	Apps	(Gls)
2005	Orange County Blue Star	7	(1)
2006	San Fernando Valley	10	(1)
2006–2009	VfL Wolfsburg	9	(0)
2007–2008	→ VfL Wolfsburg II	6	(1)
2009–2010	Vitória de Guimarães	0	(0)
2010	→ Aves (loan)	5	(0)
2012–2014	Colorado Rapids	40	(7)
Total		77	(10)

International career
2004–2005	United States U20	12	(2)
2008	United States U23	6	(0)
2007	United States	2	(0)
- * Club domestic league appearances and goals

Kamani Helekunihi Hill (born December 28, 1985) is an American former professional soccer player who played as a forward or winger.

== Early years ==
Hill was born in Berkeley, California to a Trinidadian father and an American mother of Hawaiian origin. He grew up playing in various Bay Area youth leagues and attended Berkeley High School, where he was a star forward on their soccer team. He then attended UCLA, where he played in 40 games (32 starts), scored nine goals, and assisted on 13 more in his two seasons with the team. During his college years he also played with Orange County Blue Star and San Fernando Valley Quakes in the USL Premier Development League.

== Professional career ==
=== Europe ===
At the beginning of October 2006, Hill went to Germany for a trial with Bundesliga team VfL Wolfsburg, and in November he signed a 2 1/2-year contract with the team. He made his first-team debut on January 27, 2007, as a substitute in a 2–1 defeat away at Hertha BSC Berlin. However, after a promising start, the arrival of coach Felix Magath at the club saw Hill relegated to the second team, where he spent most of his time at Wolfsburg. During November 2008, he trained with Norwegian club FK Bodø/Glimt. However, he was not offered a contract. In April 2009, he began a ten-day trial with Vitória de Guimarães upon the recommendation of his Wolfsburg teammate Alex, and on May 8 the club announced his signing to a three-year contract.

Hill was released by Vitória de Guimarães in July 2010.

=== United States ===
Hill returned to the United States to train with Major League Soccer club San Jose Earthquakes. Hill signed with Major League Soccer club Colorado Rapids on March 28, 2012.

== International career ==
Hill played for the United States U20 national team in the Suwon Youth Tournament in South Korea in 2005, where he scored a game-winning goal against Argentina.

He later made his debut for the senior United States senior national team on June 2, 2007, as a substitute in a 4–1 friendly match victory over China in San Jose, California. Hill made his second and final appearance coming on as a substitute for Landon Donovan in a 1–0 friendly loss to Sweden in Gothenburg, Sweden on August 22, 2007.
