= Steward Ceus =

Haitian footballer (born 1987)

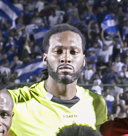
- Steward Ceus in 2017

Personal information
- Full name: Steward Ceus
- Date of birth: March 26, 1987 (age 39)
- Place of birth: West Haverstraw, New York, United States
- Height: 6 ft 6 in (1.98 m)
- Position: Goalkeeper

Youth career
- 2005–2008: Albany Great Danes

Senior career*
Years	Team	Apps	(Gls)
2009–2013	Colorado Rapids	4	(0)
2009	→ Charlotte Eagles (loan)	10	(0)
2010	→ Charlotte Eagles (loan)	3	(0)
2014	Närpes Kraft	25	(0)
2015	Atlanta Silverbacks	22	(0)
2016	Minnesota United	4	(0)
2017	San Francisco Deltas	0	(0)
2018–2019	Colorado Springs Switchbacks	17	(0)
2020	New York Cosmos	0	(0)

International career^{‡}
2010–	Haiti	16	(0)
- * Club domestic league appearances and goals as of October 25, 2019 ‡ National team caps and goals as of April 7, 2018

Steward Ceus (born March 26, 1987) is a Haitian footballer who most recently played as a goalkeeper for New York Cosmos in the National Independent Soccer Association.

== Career ==
=== Youth and college ===
Ceus attended North Rockland High School, where he lettered in soccer all four years (as well as tennis for three years and basketball), posted a county and school-record 36 career shutouts as a junior, earned all-league laurels all four years, all-section accolades three times and all-county honors on two occasions.

He played four years of college soccer at the University at Albany, where he was named to the America East Commissioner's Honor Roll and ranked second in America East with 66 saves as a freshman, made the America East All-Academic Team and was named to the America East Commissioner's Academic Honor Roll as a sophomore, and garnered America East All-Academic Team honors as a junior in 2007.

=== Professional ===
Ceus was drafted in the third round (37th overall) of the 2009 MLS SuperDraft by the Colorado Rapids. However, he did play in the 2nd half of the Community Shield against the Sounders at CenturyLink Field. The Rapids lost 3–1. Ceus let in two goals.

He was loaned to the Charlotte Eagles of the USL Second Division in June 2009, to gain experience and maintain fitness levels; he made his debut for them on June 20, 2009, in a game against Richmond Kickers. He renewed this loan with the Eagles in March 2010.

Ceus was released by Colorado on December 6, 2013, after five seasons with the club. On March 21, 2014, he arrived in Finland to try out for the Finnish club Närpes Kraft Fotbollsförening for the starting goalkeeper position. On April 11, he signed a one-year contract.

On January 14, 2015, Ceus returned to the United States, signing with NASL club Atlanta Silverbacks.

=== International ===
Ceus made his debut for Haiti in 2010.
