= Tony Cascio =

American soccer player

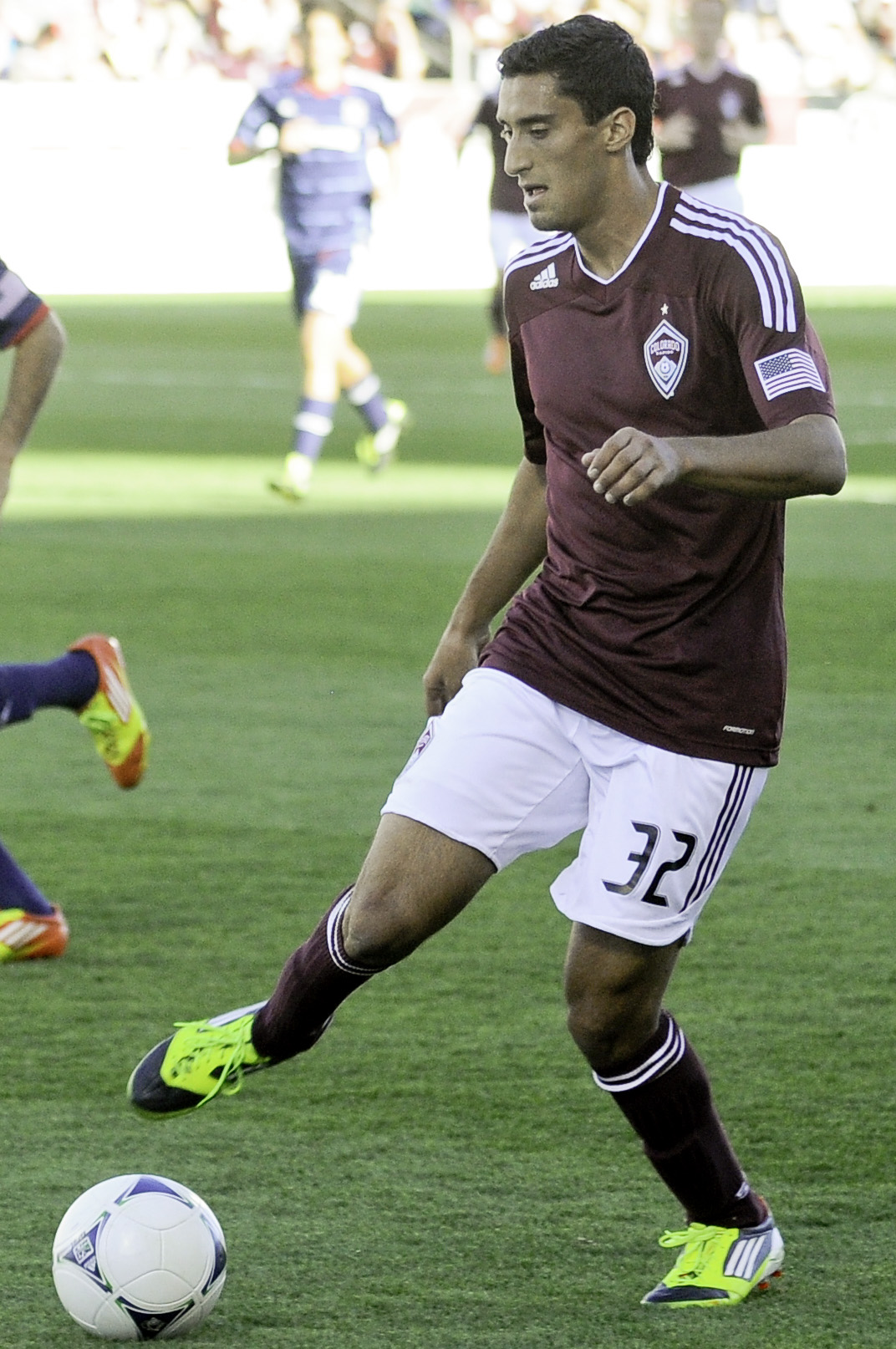

Personal information
- Full name: Anthony Cascio
- Date of birth: March 28, 1990 (age 36)
- Place of birth: Gilbert, Arizona, U.S.
- Height: 5 ft 11 in (1.80 m)
- Position: Attacking midfielder

Team information
- Current team: Sporting Arizona FC

Youth career
- 2008–2011: Connecticut Huskies

Senior career*
Years	Team	Apps	(Gls)
2012–2014	Colorado Rapids	42	(4)
2014	→ Houston Dynamo (loan)	6	(0)
2015	Orlando City	0	(0)
2016	Arizona United	22	(1)
2018	Sporting AZ	0	(0)
Total		70	(5)
- * Club domestic league appearances and goals as of March 7, 2018

Tony Cascio (born March 28, 1990) is an American former professional soccer player.

== Career ==
=== College and amateur ===
Tony begin his soccer career playing for Hamilton High School in his home town of Chandler, Arizona. Cascio played college soccer at the University of Connecticut between 2008 and 2011. During his time at UConn, Cascio was named 2010 NSCAA First Team All-American, Big East Offensive Player of the Year in 2010, and was a two-time All-Big East First Team selection in both 2009 and 2010. During his junior year, he was named NSCAA/Performance Subaru Division I First Team All-American, Soccer America MVP Second Team, and was a MAC Hermann Trophy Semifinalist. As a sophomore, was named to the Northeast Region Second Team and selected to the All-Big east First team.

=== Colorado Rapids ===
The Colorado Rapids selected Cascio in the first round (No. 14 overall) of the 2012 MLS SuperDraft.

Cascio made his debut during a 2–0 win over Columbus Crew on March 10, 2012. Cascio recorded his first professional goal against the Philadelphia Union on March 18, 2012, by beating defender Chris Albright to fire home past Zac MacMath.

=== Houston Dynamo ===
Cascio was loaned to the Houston Dynamo for the 2014 season in exchange for a season's use of an international roster spot. He was the first player to be loaned within MLS.

=== Orlando City SC ===
Cascio was selected in the 2nd round of the 2014 Expansion draft by Orlando City SC.

Started and played 57 minutes in preseason game and was on the bench for the first two games of 2015 but missed the next six months due to a bulging disc in his back.

=== Arizona United SC ===
Cascio signed with Arizona United on March 8, 2016.

=== Sporting Arizona FC ===
Cascio signed with Sporting Arizona FC of the UPSL on March 7, 2018.
