= Nick LaBrocca =

American soccer player

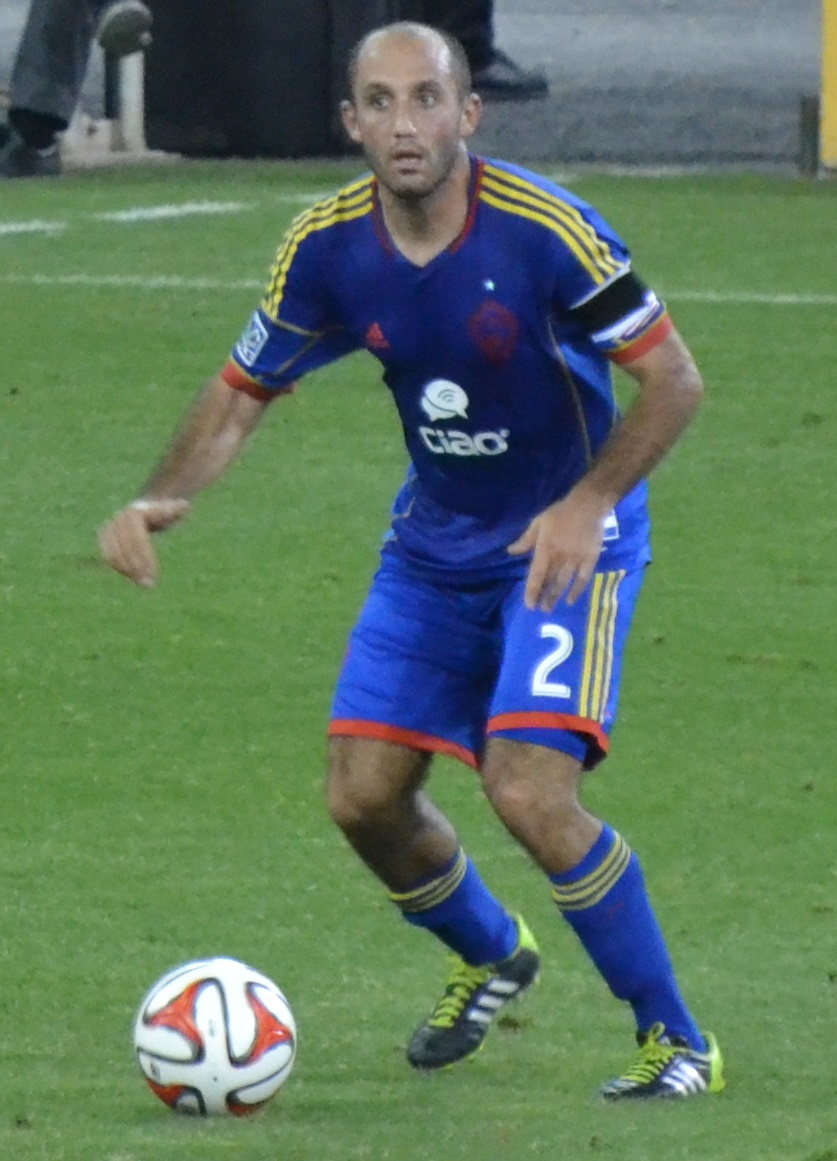
- LaBrocca playing for the Colorado Rapids

Personal information
- Full name: Nicholas LaBrocca
- Date of birth: December 4, 1984 (age 41)
- Place of birth: Howell Township, New Jersey, U.S.
- Height: 5 ft 9 in (1.75 m)
- Position: Midfielder

College career
Years	Team	Apps	(Gls)
2003–2006	Rutgers Scarlet Knights		

Senior career*
Years	Team	Apps	(Gls)
2007–2010	Colorado Rapids	61	(4)
2010	Toronto FC	28	(1)
2011–2012	Chivas USA	63	(10)
2013–2015	Colorado Rapids	68	(3)
2016	Chicago Fire	12	(0)
- * Club domestic league appearances and goals as of November 11, 2016

Nick LaBrocca (born December 4, 1984) is an American former soccer player.

== Career ==
=== Youth and college ===
LaBrocca played high school soccer at Christian Brothers Academy in Lincroft, New Jersey before going on to having a three time All-Big East career at Rutgers University.

=== Professional ===
After impressing the scouts at the 2007 MLS Combine, LaBrocca was selected 35th overall by Colorado Rapids in the 2007 MLS SuperDraft. LaBrocca was a regular starter for the reserve team that won the 2007 MLS Reserve Division championship, and became a regular starter in the senior team during the 2008 MLS season.

In March 2010, LaBrocca was traded with a third-round pick in the 2011 MLS SuperDraft pick to Toronto FC in exchange for Marvell Wynne. He made his debut for Toronto FC on March 27, 2010, against Columbus Crew. LaBrocca scored his first goal for the club in a 4–1 home victory over Chicago on May 8.

In March 2011, LaBrocca was traded to Chivas USA in exchange for Alan Gordon. The move to Chivas USA would end up serving as the catalyst for LaBrocca's career year. On July 9, LaBrocca scored the 10,000th goal in MLS history in a 1–1 draw with Sporting Kansas City. Then, on July 19, LaBrocca was selected for the 2011 MLS All-Star Game against Manchester United. He played the second half as Manchester United won 4–0.

In January 2013, LaBrocca made his return to Colorado after he was traded from Chivas USA to the Rapids in exchange for Eric Avila.

LaBrocca signed with Chicago Fire in January 2016.

=== International ===
LaBrocca has played for the US national U-20 and U-23 national teams. On November 11, 2008, LaBrocca received his first call up to the senior national team camp ahead of a World Cup Qualifier against Guatemala, but did not play in the game.

== Honors ==
=== Toronto FC ===
- Canadian Championship (1): 2010

=== Individual ===
- Major League Soccer All-Star (1): 2011
