= Hendry Thomas =

Honduran footballer (born 1985)

Personal information
- Full name: Hendry Bernardo Thomas Suazo
- Date of birth: 23 February 1985 (age 41)
- Place of birth: La Ceiba, Honduras
- Height: 1.80 m (5 ft 11 in)
- Position: Defensive midfielder

Youth career
- Olimpia Reservas

Senior career*
Years	Team	Apps	(Gls)
2001–2009	Olimpia	143	(6)
2009–2012	Wigan Athletic	55	(0)
2012–2013	Colorado Rapids	35	(2)
2014	FC Dallas	10	(0)
2015	Fort Lauderdale Strikers	15	(0)
2018–2019	Olimpia	9	(0)
Total		267	(8)

International career
2007–2008	Honduras U23	7	(3)
2005–2011	Honduras	52	(2)
- * Club domestic league appearances and goals

Hendry Bernardo Thomas Suazo (born 23 February 1985), also known as Buchuca, is a Honduran former footballer who played as a defensive midfielder.

Thomas has been described as displaying a "rugged approach driven by his ample physical gifts and his significant work rate and supplemented with enough technical ability to excel in his preferred holding midfield role."

== Club career ==
=== Early years ===
Thomas made his debut with Olimpia on 26 September 2001, against Real Comayagua when he was only 16 years of age. He continued to play for Olimpia of Tegucigalpa in the Liga Nacional de Honduras. He has been a regular member of the Honduras national football team since 2005. Thomas is the cousin of fellow footballers Maynor Suazo, David Suazo and Allan Lalín. He scored Olimpia's 2000th goal in the club's history. During his time at Olimpia, the club went on to win many Liga Nacional de Fútbol games. Thomas underwent a trial period with French club Toulouse. However, the trial was unsuccessful.

=== Wigan Athletic ===
In July 2009, Thomas made his move to Premier League side Wigan Athletic on a three-year deal, subject to being granted a work permit. Wigan also made a failed attempt to sign Thomas in 2008 after work permit issues arose but on 2 July, it was officially announced that he would join Wigan and he was given the shirt number 6. He made his debut against Aston Villa on 15 August 2009, and assisted a goal in a 2–0 victory for Wigan. In his first three matches, he won one 'Man of the Match' (Aston Villa) and one 'Most Impressive Player' (Manchester United) award. Early on in the season, Thomas formed a strong midfield partnership with Mohamed Diamé and was praised by Roberto Martínez. On 16 January 2010, Thomas received a red card for the first time in his Premier League career due to a second bookable offence in a 2–0 win over Wolverhampton Wanderers. In his first season, he made 33 appearances (31 in the Premier League, 1 in League Cup and FA Cup).

In the 2009–10 and 2010–11 seasons, Thomas was a regular member of the team. In the opening weeks of the 2010–11 season, Thomas received praise from his manager Roberto Martinez after a string of all-action displays in central midfield. Towards the end of the 2010–11 season with Wigan facing relegation, Thomas rarely featured, often being on the bench or being left out of the squad due to the return of James McCarthy from injury. On the last day of the season, Wigan would maintain their Premier League place for the next season after beating Stoke City 1–0, thanks to Hugo Rodallega. Despite losing his place in the starting line-up to McCarthy, Thomas still managed to make 30 appearances (24 in the Premier League, 4 in the League Cup and 2 in FA Cup). One month after the season ended, Martinez stated Thomas was still in his plans for the next season.

However, in the 2011–12 season, the club went through various tactical changes as well as new signings, and Thomas struggled to even make matchday squads during the first half of the season. Thomas would go on to make only two appearances, both in League Cup and FA Cup. In the January transfer window, Martinez insisted Thomas would not leave the club, maintaining he still had a future at Wigan by hinting at the offer of a new contract. However, at the end of 2011–12 season, Thomas was released by Wigan, along with several other players upon the expiration of their contracts.

=== Major League Soccer ===
On 20 August 2012, Thomas signed with the Colorado Rapids of Major League Soccer. Shortly after moving to Colorado, he spoke highly of his move, stating that he's looking forward to the challenge. On 31 August 2012, he made his debut in a 1–0 loss against Portland Timbers. After the game, he stated to the media that he was happy with his debut, but the result was disappointing. After a half season, he signed an improved long-term deal with the club. On 30 March 2013, he scored his first goal for the club, from a penalty, in a 2–2 draw against the Timbers. After the game, Thomas updated his Facebook profile, dedicating his goal to, "God, because without him, nothing is possible. Family, because they are there through the good and the bad and all my Honduran people that wish me well and always message me with positive vibes."

Thomas followed coach Oscar Pareja to FC Dallas for the 2014 season. Thomas missed the second half of the season due to injury. In December 2014, FC Dallas declined the option to sign Thomas for the 2015 season.

== International career ==
Thomas made his debut for Honduras in a February 2005 UNCAF Nations Cup match against Panama and has earned a total of 52 caps, scoring 2 goals. He has represented his country in 15 FIFA World Cup qualification matches and at the 2008 Summer Olympics as well at the 2010 FIFA World Cup. He also played at the 2005 and 2009 UNCAF Nations Cups as well as at the 2005 and 2011 CONCACAF Gold Cups.

His most recent international was a September 2011 friendly match against Colombia.

=== International goals ===
Hendry Thomas: International goals
No.	Date	Venue	Opponent	Score	Result	Competition
1	26 March 2008	Lockhart Stadium, Fort Lauderdale, United States	Colombia	2 – 1	2–1	Friendly
2	11 October 2008	Estadio Olímpico Metropolitano, San Pedro Sula, Honduras	Canada	3 – 1	3–1	World Cup 2010 Qualifier

== Personal life ==
Thomas received his U.S. green card in October 2013, which qualifies him as a domestic player for MLS roster purposes.

While playing for the Colorado Rapids, Thomas received the nickname "El Patrón" from teammates Jaime Castrillón and Luis Eduardo Zapata. Prior to that, Thomas had been referred to as "El Doctór" while playing in Honduras.
