= 2017 Colorado Rapids season =

Colorado Rapids
2017 season
- Chairman: Stan Kroenke
- Head coach: Pablo Mastroeni
- MLS Cup Playoffs: Did not qualify
- U.S. Open Cup: Lost 3-1 to FC Dallas in the Fifth Round
- Top goalscorer: League: Dominique Badji (6); All: Dominique Badji (7)
- Highest home attendance: 18,586 (June 3 vs. CLB)
- Lowest home attendance: 13,496 (June 21 vs. LA)
- Average home league attendance: 15,250
Home colors	Away colors

The 2017 Colorado Rapids season was the club's 22nd season of existence, and their 22nd season in Major League Soccer, the top tier of the American soccer pyramid.

== Current squad ==
Note: Flags indicate national team as defined under FIFA eligibility rules; some limited exceptions apply. Players may hold more than one non-FIFA nationality. Squad correct as of February 6, 2016.

No.	Pos.	Nation	Player
1	GK	USA	Tim Howard (DP)
2	DF	USA	Mike da Fonte
3	DF	USA	Eric Miller
4	DF	USA	Marc Burch
5	DF	TRI	Mekeil Williams
6	MF	USA	Sam Cronin
8	MF	USA	Dillon Powers
9	FW	IRL	Kevin Doyle (DP)
11	FW	ALB	Shkëlzen Gashi (DP)
12	GK	USA	John Berner
14	FW	SEN	Dominique Badji
15	MF	USA	Sam Hamilton
16	FW	USA	Alan Gordon
17	MF	USA	Dillon Serna (HGP)
18	GK	USA	Zac MacMath
20	MF	MEX	Ricardo Perez (HGP)
21	MF	GHA	Bismark Adjei-Boateng
22	MF	UGA	Micheal Azira
23	DF	USA	Bobby Burling
24	DF	USA	Kortne Ford (HGP)
26	DF	CRC	Dennis Castillo
27	DF	CHN	Shang Gong
29	MF	USA	Caleb Calvert
31	GK	USA	Cody Mizell (on loan from Charlotte Independence)
33	DF	USA	Jared Watts
44	DF	SWE	Axel Sjöberg
94	MF	USA	Marlon Hairston

== Player movement ==
=== In ===
Per Major League Soccer and club policies terms of the deals do not get disclosed.

Date	Pos.	Player	Previous club	Fee/notes	No.	Source
January 6, 2017	(United States) Kortne Ford	DF	(United States) Denver Pioneers			
January 6, 2017	(Mexico) Ricardo Perez	MF	(United States) Creighton Bluejays			
January 23, 2017	(United States) Alan Gordon	FW	(United States) LA Galaxy	Free Agent signing		
January 24, 2017	(Ghana) Nana	MF	(England) Manchester City	Transfer		
March 4, 2017	(United States) Sam Hamilton	MF	(United States) Denver Pioneers	MLS SuperDraft		
March 14, 2017	(United States) Mike da Fonte	DF	(United States) Sacramento Republic	Free Transfer		
March 31, 2017	(United States) Josh Gatt	MF	(United States) Minnesota United FC	Traded		
March 31, 2017	(Sweden) Mohammed Saeid	MF	(United States) Minnesota United FC	Traded		
July 26, 2017	(Germany) Stefan Aigner	MF	(Germany) 1860 Munich	Free signing		
August 10, 2017	(United States) Luis Gil	MF	(United States) Orlando City SC	Traded		

=== Out ===
Date	Pos.	Player	Destination club	Fee/notes	No.	Source
December 11, 2016	(United States) Joseph Greenspan	DF	(United States) Minnesota United FC	Traded		
December 12, 2016	(Republic of Ireland) Sean St. Ledger	DF		Option declined		
December 12, 2016	(Guatemala) Marco Pappa	MF	(Guatemala) CSD Municipal	Option declined		
December 12, 2016	(United States) Zach Pfeffer	MF		Option declined		
December 12, 2016	(United States) Conor Doyle	FW	Puerto Rico FC	Option declined		
December 12, 2016	(United States) Jermaine Jones	MF	(United States) LA Galaxy	Out of contract		
December 12, 2016	(France) Sebastian Le Toux	MF	(United States) D.C. United	Out of contract		
March 31, 2017	(United States) Marc Burch	DF	(United States) Minnesota United FC	Traded		
March 31, 2017	(United States) Sam Cronin	MF	(United States) Minnesota United FC	Waived		
August 10, 2017	(United States) Dillon Powers	MF	(United States) Orlando City SC	Traded		

=== Loans ===
Per Major League Soccer and club policies terms of the deals do not get disclosed.

==== In ====
Date	Player	Position	Loaned from	Notes	Ref

== Preseason ==
February 4, 2017	Ventura County Fusion	1–1	Colorado Rapids	Thousand Oaks, California, U.S.
12:00 MT	Casillas 83'	Report	Badji 86'	Stadium: Rolland Stadium

February 8, 2017	Ventura County Fusion	1–6	Colorado Rapids	Thousand Oaks, California, U.S.
11:00 MT	89'	Report	Badji 7'; Calvert 48', 60'; Hairston 69'; Callahan 74'; Siaj 82' (pen.)	Stadium: Rolland Stadium

=== Desert Diamond Cup ===
February 15, 2017 DDC	Colorado Rapids	1–1	Sporting Kansas City	Tucson, Arizona, U.S.
11:00 MT	Adjei-Boateng (yellow card) 40'; Powers 90+' (pen.)	Report	Didic 51'; Volesky (yellow card) 58'; Mustivar (yellow card) 78'; Porter (yellow card) 90'; Zendejas (yellow card) 90+'; Joya (yellow card) 90+'	Stadium: Kino North Stadium; Referee: Allen Chapman

February 18, 2017 DDC	Colorado Rapids	3–1	New England Revolution	Tucson, Arizona, U.S.
1:00 MT	Calvert 44', 60'; Badji 45+1'; Cronin (yellow card) 52'	Report	Agudelo 19'	Stadium: Kino North Stadium; Referee: Kevin Stott

February 22, 2017 DDC	Colorado Rapids	1–0	New York City FC	Tucson, Arizona, U.S.
5:00 MT	Watts (yellow card) 27'; Cronin 45'	Report		Stadium: Kino North Stadium; Referee: Ricardo Salazar

February 25, 2017 DDC	Colorado Rapids	0–2	Houston Dynamo	Tucson, Arizona, U.S.
TBD MT	Sjöberg (yellow card) 44'; Burch (yellow card) 84'	Report	Quioto 43', 67'; Elis (yellow card) 61'	Stadium: Kino North Stadium; Referee: Baldomero Toledo

== Competitions ==
=== MLS ===
==== Standings ====
===== Western Conference =====
Pos	Team	Pld	W	L	T	GF	GA	GD	Pts
7	FC Dallas	34	11	10	13	48	48	0	46
8	Real Salt Lake	34	13	15	6	48	56	−8	45
9	Minnesota United FC	34	10	18	6	47	70	−23	36
10	Colorado Rapids	34	9	19	6	31	51	−20	33
11	LA Galaxy	34	8	18	8	45	67	−22	32

Source: MLS

===== Overall table =====
Pos	Team	Pld	W	L	T	GF	GA	GD	Pts
18	Orlando City SC	34	10	15	9	39	58	−19	39
19	Minnesota United FC	34	10	18	6	47	70	−23	36
20	Colorado Rapids	34	9	19	6	31	51	−20	33
21	D.C. United	34	9	20	5	31	60	−29	32
22	LA Galaxy	34	8	18	8	45	67	−22	32

Source: MLS
Rules for classification: 1) points; 2) total wins; 3) total goal differential; 4) total goals scored; 5) disciplinary points; 6) away goals scored; 7) away goal differential; 8) coin toss or drawing of lots

==== Results summary ====
Overall								Home						Away					
Pld	Pts	W	L	T	GF	GA	GD	W	L	T	GF	GA	GD	W	L	T	GF	GA	GD
34	33	9	19	6	31	51	−20	8	5	4	24	20	+4	1	14	2	7	31	−24

==== Results by round ====
Round	1	2	3	4	5	6	7	8	9	10	11	12	13	14	15	16	17	18	19	20	21	22	23	24	25	26	27	28	29	30	31	32	33	34
Stadium	H	A	A	A	H	A	A	H	H	A	A	H	H	H	H	A	H	H	A	A	H	A	H	A	A	A	A	H	A	A	H	H	H	A
Result	W	L	D	L	L	L	L	L	W	L	L	W	W	W	L	L	W	L	D	L	D	D	L	L	L	L	W	D	L	L	W	D	W	L

Updated to match(es) played on October 25, 2017. Source: See results
A = Away; H = Home; W = Win; D = Draw; L = Loss

==== Results ====
March 4, 2017 1	Colorado Rapids	1–0	New England Revolution	Commerce City, Colorado
16:00 MST	Badji 52'; Calvert (yellow card) 68'; Powers (yellow card) 69'; Cronin (yellow card) 75'	Report	Tierney (yellow card) 14'; Kamara (yellow card) 79'	Stadium: Dick's Sporting Goods Park; Attendance: 16,126; Referee: Jose Carlos Rivero

March 11, 2017 2	New York Red Bulls	1–0	Colorado Rapids	Harrison, New Jersey
14:00 MST	Davis (yellow card) 35'; Miller 45' (o.g.); Etienne (yellow card) 55'; Royer (yellow card) 79'	Report	Azira (yellow card) 90+4'	Stadium: Red Bull Arena (New Jersey); Attendance: 19,375; Referee: Robert Sibiga

March 18, 2017 3	Colorado Rapids	2–2	Minnesota United FC	Commerce City, Colorado
19:00 MDT	Badji 17'; Cronin (yellow card) 56'; Hairston 59'; Williams (yellow card) 89'	Report	Warner (yellow card) 41'; Molino 50' (pen.); Ramirez 58'; Thiesson (yellow card) 64'; Davis (red card) 70'; Shuttleworth (yellow card) 90+4'; Danladi (yellow card) 90+5'	Stadium: Dick's Sporting Goods Park; Attendance: 14,013; Referee: Nima Saghafi

April 9, 2017 4	Sporting Kansas City	3–1	Colorado Rapids	Kansas City, Kansas
17:00 MDT	Sinovic 6'; Sánchez (yellow card) 38'; Gerso 58'; Dwyer 85'	Report	Miller (yellow card) 84'; Watts (yellow card) 86'; Doyle 94'	Stadium: Children's Mercy Park; Attendance: 19,249; Referee: Allen Chapman

April 15, 2017 5 Rocky Mountain Cup	Colorado Rapids	1–2	Real Salt Lake	Commerce City, Colorado
19:00 MDT	Doyle; Williams (yellow card) 84'; Watts (red card) 85'	Report	Movsisyan (85 PK); Lennon 88' (Phillips)	Stadium: Dick's Sporting Goods Park; Attendance: 15,087; Referee: Ismail Elfath

April 23, 2017 6	Minnesota United FC	1–0	Colorado Rapids	Minneapolis, Minnesota
16:00 MDT	Molino (yellow card) 33'; Ibarra 72' (Venegas)	Report	Badji (yellow card) 18'; Williams (yellow card) 90+2'	Stadium: TCF Bank Stadium; Attendance: 17.491; Referee: Fotis Bazakos

April 29, 2017 7	Orlando City SC	2–0	Colorado Rapids	Orlando, Florida
14:00 MDT	Perez (yellow card) 36'; Rivas 70' (Higuita)Redding (yellow card) 74'; Kaká 90+1'	Report	Doyle (yellow card) 20'; Azira (yellow card) 35'; Burling (yellow card) 90+2'	Stadium: Orlando City Stadium; Attendance: 25,527; Referee: Robert Sibiga

May 5, 2017 8	Colorado Rapids	0–1	Vancouver Whitecaps FC	Commerce City, Colorado
20:00 MDT	Williams (yellow card) 39' (yellow-red card) 84'; Gashi (yellow card) 80'	Report	Montero (yellow card) 48'; Shea 83' (Mezquida)	Stadium: Dick's Sporting Goods Park; Attendance: 13,745; Referee: Jorge González

May 13, 2017 9	Colorado Rapids	3–0	San Jose Earthquakes	Commerce City, Colorado
14:00 MDT	Gashi; Badji 35' (Gordon); Powers (yellow card) 42'; Miller (yellow card) 55'	Report		Stadium: Dick's Sporting Goods Park; Attendance: 14,567; Referee: Marcos Deoliveira

May 17, 2017 10	Chicago Fire	3–0	Colorado Rapids	Bridgeview, Illinois
18:30 MDT	Nikolic 15' (Vincent), 74' (de Leeuw); Accam	Report	Azira (yellow card) 62'	Stadium: Toyota Park; Attendance: 11,244; Referee: Armando Villarreal

May 20, 2017 11	Philadelphia Union	2–1	Colorado Rapids	Chester, Pennsylvania
17:00 MDT	Bedoya (yellow card) 63'; Sapong 67' (pen.); Medunjanin 75'	Report	Calvert 15' (Doyle) (yellow card) 69' (yellow-red card) 69'; Saeid (yellow card) 44'; Gatt (yellow card) 74'	Stadium: Talen Energy Stadium; Attendance: 18,399; Referee: Jose Carlos Rivero

May 27, 2017 12	Colorado Rapids	1–0	Sporting Kansas City	Commerce City, Colorado
18:00 MDT	Ford 11' (Gashi); Burling (yellow card) 19'; Miller (yellow card) 22'; Howard (yellow card) 86'; Doyle (yellow card) 89'	Report	Espinoza (yellow card) 41' (yellow-red card) 90+3'	Stadium: Dick's Sporting Goods Park; Attendance: 17,648; Referee: Hilario Grajeda

June 3, 2017 13	Colorado Rapids	2–1	Columbus Crew SC	Commerce City, Colorado
19:00 MDT	Doyle (yellow card) 48'; Ford (yellow card) 73'; Azira (yellow card) 79'; Gordon 86' (Gatt)	Report	Higuain 61' (Meram)	Stadium: Dick's Sporting Goods Park; Attendance: 17,586; Referee: Ismail Elfath

June 17, 2017 14	Colorado Rapids	2–1	Portland Timbers	Commerce City, Colorado
19:30 MDT	Badji 51' (Doyle); Gordon 89' (Saeid) (yellow card) 90'		Blanco 18' (Valeri); Valeri (yellow card) 61'	Stadium: Dick's Sporting Goods Park; Referee: Baldomero Toledo

June 21, 2017 15	Colorado Rapids	1–3	LA Galaxy	Commerce City, Colorado
19:00 MDT	da Fonte (yellow card) 24'; Serna	Report	McBean; Smith (yellow card) 29'; Joao Pedro (yellow card) 34'; Alessandrini 71' (pen.)	Stadium: Dick's Sporting Goods Park; Attendance: 13,496; Referee: Chris Penso

June 24, 2017 16	Atlanta United FC	1–0	Colorado Rapids	Atlanta, Georgia
17:00 MDT	Martinez 67' (Vazquez); Almiron (yellow card) 84'	Report	Castillo (yellow card) 35'; Gatt (yellow card) 48'; Powers (yellow card) 72'; Azira (yellow card) 81'	Stadium: Bobby Dodd Stadium; Attendance: 44,938; Referee: Silviu Petrescu

July 1, 2017 17	Colorado Rapids	3–1	Houston Dynamo	Commerce City, Colorado
19:00 MDT	da Fonte (yellow card) 4'; Doyle; Hairston; Hamilton (yellow card) 82'	Report	Torres 45+5' (DeLaGarza)	Stadium: Dick's Sporting Goods Park; Attendance: 13,774; Referee: Sorin Stoica

July 4, 2017 18	Colorado Rapids	1–3	Seattle Sounders FC	Commerce City, Colorado
19:00 MDT	Williams (yellow card) 23'; Boateng (yellow card) 45+2'; Badji (yellow card) 48' da Fonte (yellow card) 54'; Gordon (yellow card) 66'	Report	Dempsey; Bruin	Stadium: Dick's Sporting Goods Park; Attendance: 17,432; Referee: Hilario Grajeda

July 22, 2017 19	Toronto FC	1–1	Colorado Rapids	Toronto, Ontario
17:00 MDT	Chapman 5'; Mavinga (yellow card) 26'		Sjöberg (yellow card) 44'; Badji 76' (Gordon); Hairston (yellow card) 90+5'	Stadium: BMO Field; Attendance: 28,060; Referee: Juan Guzman Jr

July 29, 2017 20	San Jose Earthquakes	1–0	Colorado Rapids	San Jose, California
18:00 MDT	Lima; Imperiale (yellow card) 77'	Report	da Fonte (yellow card) 37'	Stadium: Avaya Stadium; Attendance: 18,000; Referee: Hilario Grajeda

August 5, 2017 21	Colorado Rapids	2–2	Vancouver Whitecaps FC	Commerce City, Colorado
20:00 MDT	Sjöberg 15'; Azira (yellow card) 45+1'; Doyle; Miller (yellow card) 68'; Hairston (yellow card) 75'	Report	Tchani 5'; Montero 76' (Techera)	Stadium: Dick's Sporting Goods Park; Attendance: 15,625; Referee: Nima Saghafi

August 12, 2017 22	FC Dallas	0–0	Colorado Rapids	Frisco, Texas
18:00 MDT	Acosta (yellow card) 16'; Hedges (yellow card) 37'	Report	Azira (yellow card) 40' da Fonte (yellow card) 57'; Doyle (yellow card) 86'; Watts (yellow card) 86'	Stadium: Toyota Stadium; Attendance: 14,522; Referee: Alan Kelly

August 19, 2017 23	Colorado Rapids	0–1	D.C. United	Commerce City, Colorado
19:00 MDT	Watts (yellow card) 78'	Report	Watts 27' (o.g.); Acosta (yellow card) 79'; DeLeon (yellow card) 85'	Stadium: Dick's Sporting Goods Park; Attendance: 16,089; Referee: Alex Chilowicz

August 23, 2017 24	Portland Timbers	2–1	Colorado Rapids	Portland, Oregon
20:30 MDT	Valeri; Nagbe; Chará (yellow card) 40'; Guzmán (yellow card) 73'	Report	Saeid 28'	Stadium: Providence Park; Attendance: 21,144; Referee: David Gantar

August 26, 2017 25	Real Salt Lake	4–1	Colorado Rapids	Sandy, Utah
20:00 MDT	Glad (yellow card) 32'; Plata; Silva 50' (pen.), 90+2' (Lennon) (yellow card) 50'; Acosta (red card) 57'; Lennon	Report	Gordon (yellow card) 73' (yellow-red card) 77'; Gatt 82' (Azira); Doyle (yellow card) 90+4'	Stadium: Rio Tinto Stadium; Attendance: 18,855; Referee: Armando Villarreal

September 2, 2017 26	LA Galaxy	3–0	Colorado Rapids	Carson, California
21:00 MDT	Alessandrini 18' (pen.); Boateng 22' (Zardes); Zardes 56' (Alessandrini)	Report		Stadium: StubHub Center; Attendance: 17,683; Referee: Jair Marrufo

September 9, 2017 27	Houston Dynamo	0–1	Colorado Rapids	Houston, Texas
18:30 MDT	Clark (yellow card) 55'; Alex (yellow card) 57'	Report	Ford (yellow card) 52'; Badji (yellow card) 80' (goal) 90+3' (Aigner); Williams (yellow card) 82'	Stadium: BBVA Compass Stadium; Attendance: 18,105; Referee: Hilario Grajeda

September 16, 2017 28	Colorado Rapids	1–1	New York City FC	Commerce City, Colorado
19:00 MDT	Gatt (yellow card) 58'; Badji 88'	Report	McNamara 19' (Pirlo) (yellow card) 90+3'; Johnson (yellow card) 63'	Stadium: Dick's Sporting Goods Park; Attendance: 14,336; Referee: Chris Penso

September 23, 2017 29	Vancouver Whitecaps FC	2–1	Colorado Rapids	Vancouver, British Columbia
20:00 MDT	Montero 4' (Reyna); Parker (yellow card) 34'; Reyna 54' (Montero)	Report	Watts (yellow card) 14'; Williams (yellow card) 43'; Badji 45'; Azira (yellow card) 87'	Stadium: BC Place; Attendance: 22,120; Referee: Jose Carlos Rivero

September 27, 2017 30	FC Dallas	2–0	Colorado Rapids	Frisco, Texas
18:00 MDT	Figueroa; Lamah; Hedges (yellow card) 23'; González (yellow card) 84'	Report	Burling (yellow card) 12'; Aigner (yellow card) 44'; Saeid (yellow card) 45+1'	Stadium: Toyota Stadium (Texas); Attendance: 14,556; Referee: Ricardo Salazar

September 30, 2017 31	Colorado Rapids	2–1	Montreal Impact	Commerce City, Colorado
19:00 MDT	Watts (red card) 12'; Aigner 45+3' (Williams); Ford (yellow card) 48'; Gordon (yellow card) 82'	Report	Lovitz (red card) 32'; Mancosu 62' (Piette)	Stadium: Dick's Sporting Goods Park; Attendance: 15,791; Referee: Ricardo Salazar

October 7, 2017 32	Colorado Rapids	1–1	FC Dallas	Commerce City, Colorado
19:00 MDT	Aigner 15' (Gatt); Nana (yellow card) 22'; Badji (yellow card) 68'	Report	Harris 54' (Morales) (yellow card) 69'	Stadium: Dick's Sporting Goods Park; Attendance: 16,598; Referee: Silviu Petrescu

October 15, 2017 33	Colorado Rapids	1–0	Real Salt Lake	Commerce City, Colorado
17:30 MDT	Gatt 3' (Gordon); Badji (yellow card) 24'; Nana (yellow card) 90+5'	Report	Horst (yellow card) 43'	Stadium: Dick's Sporting Goods Park; Attendance: 13,102; Referee: Armando Villarreal

October 22, 2017 34	Seattle Sounders FC	3–0	Colorado Rapids	Seattle, Washington
14:00 MDT	Bruin 9' (Dempsey); Dempsey (yellow card) 24'; Torres (yellow card) 29'; Roldan (yellow card) 51'; Lodeiro 64' (pen.), 90+4' (yellow card) 90+4'; Jones (yellow card) 90+1'	Report	Aigner (yellow card) 32'; Ford (yellow card) 60'; Sjöberg (red card) 62'	Stadium: CenturyLink Field; Attendance: 44,370; Referee: Chris Penso

=== U.S. Open Cup ===
June 14, 2017 Fourth Round	Colorado Rapids	3–2	OKC Energy FC	Commerce City, Colorado
19:00 MDT	Badji 49' (Castillo); Miller 66' (Gordon); Castillo (yellow card) 68' (goal) 89' (Powers); Powers (yellow card) 83'	Report	Gonzalez 38' (Jackson); Rasmussen 45+1' (Jackson); Barril (yellow card) 77'; Wallace (yellow card) 90+2'	Stadium: Dick's Sporting Goods Park; Attendance: 1,790; Referee: Karen Abt

June 27, 2017 Fifth Round	FC Dallas	3–1	Colorado Rapids	Frisco, Texas
18:00 MDT	Pomykal (yellow card) 16'; Díaz 45' (pen.); Hollingshead 57' (Lamah); Morales 89'	Report	Ford (yellow card) 27' (yellow-red card) 88'; Hamilton (yellow card) 45+1'; Azira 46' (Calvert)	Stadium: Toyota Stadium (Texas); Attendance: 4,131; Referee: Robert Sibiga

== Squad statistics ==
As of match played 22 July 2017

=== Appearances and goals ===
No.	Pos	Nat	Player	Total		MLS		U.S. Open Cup	
No.	Pos	Nat	Player	Apps	Goals	Apps	Goals	Apps	Goals
1	GK	(United States) USA	Tim Howard	12	0	12	0	0	0
2	DF	(United States) USA	Mike da Fonte	9	0	8+1	0	0	0
3	DF	(United States) USA	Eric Miller	18	1	16	0	1+1	1
5	DF	(Trinidad and Tobago) TRI	Mekeil Williams	11	0	9+1	0	1	0
8	MF	(United States) USA	Dillon Powers	16	0	11+3	0	2	0
9	FW	(Republic of Ireland) IRL	Kevin Doyle	19	4	16+2	4	0+1	0
11	FW	(Albania) ALB	Shkëlzen Gashi	10	2	7+2	2	1	0
14	FW	(Senegal) SEN	Dominique Badji	19	7	15+3	6	0+1	1
15	MF	(United States) USA	Sam Hamilton	5	0	1+2	0	2	0
16	FW	(United States) USA	Alan Gordon	14	2	4+9	2	1	0
17	MF	(United States) USA	Dillon Serna	13	1	5+7	1	1	0
18	GK	(United States) USA	Zac MacMath	7	0	5	0	2	0
21	MF	(Ghana) GHA	Nana	7	0	4+2	0	1	0
22	MF	(Uganda) UGA	Micheal Azira	19	1	17+1	0	0+1	1
23	DF	(United States) USA	Bobby Burling	10	0	7+2	0	1	0
24	DF	(United States) USA	Kortne Ford	10	1	9	1	1	0
27	DF	(China) CHN	Shang Gong	17	2	3+12	2	1+1	0
29	FW	(United States) USA	Caleb Calvert	13	1	3+9	1	1	0
33	DF	(United States) USA	Jared Watts	13	0	10+2	0	1	0
44	DF	(Sweden) SWE	Axel Sjöberg	7	0	6	0	1	0
45	MF	(United States) USA	Joshua Gatt	10	0	4+4	0	1+1	0
90	MF	(Sweden) SWE	Mohammed Saeid	14	0	13+1	0	0	0
94	MF	(United States) USA	Marlon Hairston	20	3	16+3	3	0+1	0
Players away from Colorado Rapids on loan:
20	MF	(Mexico) MEX	Ricardo Perez	2	0	0	0	2	0
26	DF	(Costa Rica) CRC	Dennis Castillo	5	1	3	0	2	1
Players who left Colorado Rapids during the season:
6	MF	(United States) USA	Sam Cronin	3	0	3	0	0	0
4	DF	(United States) USA	Marc Burch	3	0	3	0	0	0

=== Goal scorers ===
Place	Position	Nation	Number	Name	MLS	U.S. Open Cup	Total
1	FW	(Senegal)	14	Dominique Badji	6	1	7
2	FW	(Republic of Ireland)	9	Kevin Doyle	4	0	4
3	MF	(United States)	94	Marlon Hairston	3	0	3
4	FW	(Albania)	11	Shkëlzen Gashi	2	0	2
4	FW	(United States)	16	Alan Gordon	2	0	2
5	MF	(United States)	17	Dillon Serna	1	0	1
5	DF	(United States)	3	Eric Miller	0	1	1
5	DF	(United States)	24	Kortne Ford	1	0	1
5	DF	(Costa Rica)	26	Dennis Castillo	0	1	1
5	FW	(United States)	29	Caleb Calvert	1	0	1
5	MF	(Uganda)	22	Micheal Azira	0	1	1
				TOTALS	20	4	24

Updated July 24, 2017

=== Disciplinary record ===
Number	Nation	Position	Name	MLS		U.S. Open Cup		Total	
Number	Nation	Position	Name	Booked	Sent off (straight red)	Booked	Sent off (straight red)	Booked	Sent off (straight red)
1	(United States)	GK	Tim Howard	1	0	0	0	1	0
2	(United States)	DF	Mike da Fonte	3	0	0	0	3	0
3	(United States)	DF	Eric Miller	3	0	0	0	3	0
5	(Trinidad and Tobago)	DF	Mekeil Williams	5	1	0	0	5	1
6	(United States)	MF	Sam Cronin	2	0	0	0	2	0
8	(United States)	MF	Dillon Powers	3	0	1	0	4	0
9	(Republic of Ireland)	FW	Kevin Doyle	3	0	0	0	3	0
11	(Albania)	MF	Shkëlzen Gashi	1	0	0	0	1	0
14	(Senegal)	FW	Dominique Badji	2	0	0	0	2	0
15	(United States)	MF	Sam Hamilton	1	0	1	0	2	0
16	(United States)	FW	Alan Gordon	2	0	0	0	2	0
21	(Ghana)	FW	Nana	1	0	0	0	1	0
22	(Uganda)	MF	Micheal Azira	5	0	0	0	5	0
23	(United States)	DF	Bobby Burling	2	0	0	0	2	0
24	(United States)	DF	Kortne Ford	1	0	2	1	3	1
26	(Costa Rica)	DF	Dennis Castillo	1	0	1	0	2	0
29	(United States)	FW	Caleb Calvert	3	1	0	0	3	1
33	(United States)	DF	Jared Watts	1	1	0	0	1	1
44	(Sweden)	DF	Axel Sjöberg	1	0	0	0	1	0
45	(United States)	MF	Joshua Gatt	2	0	0	0	2	0
90	(Sweden)	MF	Mohammed Saeid	1	0	0	0	1	0
94	(United States)	MF	Marlon Hairston	1	0	0	0	1	0
			TOTALS	44	3	5	1	49	4
