= 2018 Colorado Rapids season =

Colorado Rapids
2018 season
- Owner: Stan Kroenke
- Head coach: Anthony Hudson
- Major League Soccer: Conference: 11th Overall: 21st
- MLS Cup Playoffs: Did not qualify
- U.S. Open Cup: Fourth Round
- CONCACAF Champions League: Round of 16
- Rocky Mountain Cup: Lost
- Top goalscorer: League: Dominique Badji (7); All: Dominique Badji (7)
- Highest home attendance: 17,837
- Lowest home attendance: 10,790
- Average home league attendance: 15,333
Home colors	Away colors

The 2018 Colorado Rapids season was the Colorado Rapids' 23rd season of existence, their 23rd season in Major League Soccer and their 23rd season in the top-tier of American soccer.

Due to a reconfiguration in the CONCACAF Champions League format, the Rapids behan play in the Champions League after they qualified in the 2016 season. Colorado opened their slate of competitive fixtures on February 20 in the Champions League Round of 16 with a two-legged series against Canadian champions, Toronto FC in the round of 16. On March 3, the club played their regular season opener against the Chicago Fire. The Rapids also played in the U.S. Open Cup.

== Background ==
The 2017 season saw a sharp downturn in the Rapids fortunes. Colorado finished the 2017 season second-bottom of the Western Conference table, with the third-worst overall record in Major League Soccer. Colorado finished 10th in the Western Conference and 20th in the overall table. The team scored a league-low 31 goals in 34 matches and conceded 51 goals. Dominique Badji lead the team with 7 goals across all competitions.

Outside of MLS play, the Rapids played in the 2017 edition of the U.S. Open Cup, where they lost in the fifth round to FC Dallas. The Rapids failed to qualify for the 2017 MLS Cup Playoffs. At the end of the campaign, four-year head coach, Pablo Mastroeni was relieved of his duties.

== Club ==
=== Roster ===
As of October 28, 2018.

No.	Name	Nat	Position	Since	Date of birth (age)	Signed from	Games	Goals
Goalkeepers
1	Tim Howard	(United States)	GK	2016	March 6, 1979 (age 47)	(England) Everton	75	0
18	Zac MacMath	(United States)	GK	2016	August 7, 1991 (age 34)	(United States) Philadelphia Union	31	0
50	Andrew Dykstra	(United States)	GK	2018	February 1, 1986 (age 40)	(United States) Sporting Kansas City	0	0
Defenders
2	Edgar Castillo	(United States)	LB	2018	October 8, 1986 (age 39)	(Mexico) Monterrey (loan)	28	3
4	Danny Wilson	(Scotland)	CB	2018	December 27, 1991 (age 34)	(Scotland) Rangers F.C.	23	0
5	Tommy Smith	(New Zealand)	CB	2018	March 31, 1990 (age 36)	(England) Ipswich Town	33	4
13	Sam Vines	(United States)	CB	2018	May 31, 1999 (age 27)	(United States) Charlotte Independence	1	0
23	Kip Colvey	(New Zealand)	CB	2018	March 15, 1994 (age 32)	(United States) San Jose Earthquakes	3	0
24	Kortne Ford	(United States)	CB	2017	January 26, 1996 (age 30)	(United States) Denver Pioneers	35	1
27	Deklan Wynne	(New Zealand)	CB	2018	March 20, 1995 (age 31)	(Canada) Whitecaps FC 2	25	0
44	Axel Sjöberg	(Sweden)	CB	2015	March 8, 1991 (age 35)	(United States) Marquette Golden Eagles	82	3
Midfielders
8	Johan Blomberg	(Sweden)	MF	2018	June 14, 1987 (age 39)	(Sweden) AIK	25	0
10	Kellyn Acosta	(United States)	MF	2018	July 24, 1995 (age 30)	(United States) FC Dallas	13	2
15	Sam Hamilton	(United States)	MF	2017	July 27, 1995 (age 30)	(United States) Denver Pioneers	3	0
17	Dillon Serna	(United States)	MF	2013	March 25, 1994 (age 32)	(United States) Akron Zips	91	9
19	Jack Price	(England)	MF	2018	December 19, 1992 (age 33)	(England) Wolverhampton Wanderers	31	1
20	Ricardo Perez	(Mexico)	MF	2017	May 30, 1995 (age 31)	(United States) Creighton Bluejays	0	0
21	Bismark Adjei-Boateng	(Ghana)	MF	2017	May 10, 1994 (age 32)	(Norway) Strømsgodset	38	1
26	Cole Bassett	(United States)	MF	2018	July 28, 2001 (age 24)	(United States) Colorado Rapids U–23	6	1
28	Sam Nicholson	(Scotland)	MF	2018	January 20, 1995 (age 31)	(United States) Minnesota United FC	19	2
90	Enzo Martinez	(Uruguay)	MF	2018	September 29, 1990 (age 35)	(United States) Charlotte Independence	23	0
94	Marlon Hairston	(United States)	MF	2014	March 23, 1994 (age 32)	(United States) Louisville Cardinals	95	7
Forwards
7	Giles Barnes	(Jamaica)	FW	2018	August 5, 1988 (age 37)	(Mexico) León	12	0
9	Yannick Boli	(France)	FW	2018	January 13, 1988 (age 38)	(China) Dalian Yifang	17	2
11	Shkëlzen Gashi	(Albania)	FW	2016	July 15, 1988 (age 37)	(Switzerland) Basel	64	13
12	Niki Jackson	(United States)	FW	2018	August 25, 1995 (age 30)	(United States) Grand Canyon Antelopes	15	3
29	Caleb Calvert	(United States)	FW	2014	October 22, 1996 (age 29)	(United States) Chivas USA	21	1
32	Jack McBean	(United States)	FW	2018	December 15, 1994 (age 31)	(United States) LA Galaxy	22	2

=== Team management ===
Position	Staff
General Manager	Pádraig Smith
Asst. General Manager	Fran Taylor
Personnel Director	Ena Patel
Scouting Director	Mitch Murray
Scouting Coordinator	Chris Zitterbart
Head Coach	Anthony Hudson
Asst. Coach	Conor Casey
Goalkeeper Coach	Chris Sharpe
Head of Sports Science	Chad Kolarcik
Head Athletic Trainer	Keith Garnett
Asst. Athletic Trainer	Sean O'Neill
Strength and Conditioning Coach	Miguel Motolongo
Physical Therapist	Andy Free
Team Chiropractor	Nicholas Studholme
Chief Medical Officer	Dr. Wayne Gersoff
Team Physician	Dr. Mary-Catherine Husney

Last updated: February 9, 2018
Source: Colorado Rapids

== Transfers ==
=== In ===
No.	Pos.	Player	Transferred from	Fee	Date	Source
7	FW	(Jamaica) Giles Barnes	(Mexico) Club León	Undisclosed	July 13, 2018	

==== Draft picks ====
Draft picks are not automatically signed to the team roster.

2018 Colorado Rapids SuperDraft Picks
Round	Selection	Player	Position	College	Status
2	25	(United States) Alan Winn	FW	North Carolina	Declined contract, signed with Nashville SC
2	27	(Haiti) Frantzdy Pierrot	MF	Coastal Carolina	Invited to training camp
3	50	(United States) Thomas Olsen	GK	San Diego	Signed to roster
4	72	(United States) Brian Iloski	MF	UCLA	Invited to training camp, signed with Legia Warsaw
4	73	(United States) Niki Jackson	FW	Grand Canyon	Signed to roster

=== Out ===
No.	Pos.	Player	Transferred to	Fee	Date	Source
12	GK	(United States) John Berner	(United States) Phoenix Rising FC	Option declined	November 27, 2017	
23	DF	(United States) Bobby Burling		Free	November 27, 2017	
26	DF	(Costa Rica) Dennis Castillo	(Costa Rica) Pérez Zeledón	Option declined	November 27, 2017	
45	MF	(United States) Joshua Gatt	(United States) Detroit City	Option declined	November 27, 2017	
27	MF	(United States) Luis Gil	(Mexico) Querétaro	Loan expired, purchase declined	November 27, 2017	
16	FW	(United States) Alan Gordon	(United States) Chicago Fire	Option declined	November 27, 2017	
90	MF	(Eritrea) Mohammed Saeid	(Denmark) Lyngby	Option declined	November 27, 2017	
5	DF	(Trinidad and Tobago) Mekeil Williams	(United States) Richmond Kickers	Option declined	November 27, 2017	

=== Loan in ===
No.	Pos.	Player	Loaned from	Start	End	Source
2	DF	(United States) Edgar Castillo	(Mexico) Monterrey	January 1, 2018	December 31, 2018	
10	F	(Republic of Ireland) Joe Mason	(England) Wolverhampton Wanderers	February 20, 2018	July 12, 2018	

=== Loan out ===
Pos.	Player	Loaned to	Start	End	Source
DF	(United States) Mike da Fonte	(United States) Phoenix Rising FC	February 10, 2018		
GK	(United States) Andrew Dykstra	(United States) Charlotte Independence	March 8, 2018		
DF	(United States) Sam Vines	(United States) Charlotte Independence	March 8, 2018		
MF	(United States) Ricardo Perez	(United States) Charlotte Independence	March 8, 2018		
FW	(United States) Caleb Calvert	(United States) Charlotte Independence	March 8, 2018		
DF	(New Zealand) Kip Colvey	(United States) Colorado Springs Switchbacks	July 13, 2018		

== Competitions ==
=== Friendlies ===
January 31 Preseason	Colorado Rapids	1–2	Columbus Crew	Casa Grande, Arizona
11:00 a.m. MST	Ford 26'	Report	Zardes 2'; Argudo 58'	Stadium: Grande Sports Academy Soccer Complex

February 3 Preseason	Colorado Rapids	0–2	Sporting Kansas City	Scottsdale, Arizona
11:00 a.m. MST		Report	Shelton 12'; Gerso 22'	Stadium: Phoenix Rising FC Soccer Complex

February 9 Preseason	Sporting Arizona	0–9	Colorado Rapids	Tucson, Arizona
11:00 a.m. MST		Report	Castillo 2'; McBean 25'; Calvert 63'; Aigner 67'; Jackson 78', 120'; Blomberg 102'; Perez 106'	Stadium: Kino Veterans Memorial Stadium
Note: 120 minute match of two 60-minute periods

February 14 Preseason	Phoenix Rising	0–2	Colorado Rapids	Scottsdale, Arizona
6:00 p.m. MST		Report	Badji 75'; Smith 80'	Stadium: Phoenix Rising FC Soccer Complex

July 24 Midseason	Colorado Rapids	2–2 (5–4 p)	Boca Juniors	Commerce City, Colorado
7:00 p.m. MST	Boli 30'; Martínez 59'	Report	Barrios 11'; Villa 14'	Stadium: Dick's Sporting Goods Park
	Penalties
	McBean (penalty scored); Serna (penalty scored); Martínez (penalty scored); Wynne (penalty scored); MacMath (penalty scored)		(penalty scored) Cardona; (penalty scored) Goltz; (penalty missed) Reynoso; (penalty scored) Zárate; (penalty scored) Tevez

September 1 Midseason	Tulsa Roughnecks FC	2-3	Colorado Rapids	Memphis, Tennessee
6:00 p.m. MST	Morton 14'; Rivas 26'	Report	N. Jackson 15', 30', 47'	Stadium: AutoZone Park; Attendance: 8,957

=== Major League Soccer ===
March 10, 2018 1	New England Revolution	2–1	Colorado Rapids	Foxborough, Massachusetts
11:30 MST	Fagúndez 48'; Tierney 90+3'	Report	Jackson 66'	Stadium: Gillette Stadium; Attendance: 13,305; Referee: Armando Vilarreal

March 24, 2018 2	Colorado Rapids	2–2	Sporting Kansas City	Commerce City, Colorado
19:00 MDT	Badji 5'; Mason 8'	Report	Gutierrez 57'; Rubio 90+1'	Stadium: Dick's Sporting Goods Park; Attendance: 17,424; Referee: Sorin Stoica

March 31, 2018 3	Colorado Rapids	3–0	Philadelphia Union	Commerce City, Colorado
19:00 MDT	Badji 53', 61', 87'	Report		Stadium: Dick's Sporting Goods Park; Attendance: 10,790; Referee: Robert Sibiga

April 7, 2018 4	FC Dallas	1–1	Colorado Rapids	Frisco, Texas
18:00 MDT	Colmán 89'	Report	Mason 62'	Stadium: Toyota Stadium; Attendance: 13,147; Referee: Rubiel Vasquez

April 14, 2018 5	Colorado Rapids	2–0	Toronto FC	Commerce City, Colorado
13:00 MDT	Price 2'; Gashi 78' (pen.)	Report		Stadium: Dick's Sporting Goods Park; Attendance: 11,232; Referee: Baldomero Toledo

April 21, 2018 6	Real Salt Lake	3–0	Colorado Rapids	Sandy, Utah
19:00 MDT	Plata 82' (pen.); Kreilach 89'; Rusnák 90+2'	Report		Stadium: Rio Tinto Stadium; Attendance: 17,461; Referee: Joseph Dickerson

April 29, 2018 7	Colorado Rapids	1–2	Orlando City SC	Commerce City, Colorado
14:00 MDT	Badji 26'	Report	Higuita 52'; Yotún 77' (pen.)	Stadium: Dick's Sporting Goods Park; Attendance: 15,702; Referee: Jose Carlos Rivero

May 5, 2018 8	Sporting Kansas City	1–0	Colorado Rapids	Kansas City, Kansas
18:30 MDT	Sallói 16'	Report		Stadium: Children's Mercy Park; Attendance: 20,553; Referee: Armando Villarreal

May 12, 2018 9	Colorado Rapids	1–2	New York Red Bulls	Commerce City, Colorado
19:00 MDT	McBean 85'	Report	Royer 5'; Etienne 76'	Stadium: Dick's Sporting Goods Park; Attendance: 15,691; Referee: Ismail Elfath

May 19, 2018 10	NYCFC	4–0	Colorado Rapids	New York, New York
11:00 MDT	Villa 22', 74'; Matarrita 49'; Moralez 56'	Report		Stadium: Yankee Stadium; Attendance: 21,494; Referee: David Gantar

May 26, 2018 11	Colorado Rapids	2–3	Portland Timbers	Commerce City, Colorado
19:00 MDT	Cascante 31' (o.g.); Boli 90+9' (pen.)	Report	Armenteros 29', 37'; Valeri 56'	Stadium: Dick's Sporting Goods Park; Attendance: 17,424; Referee: Sorin Stoica

June 1, 2018 12	Colorado Rapids	1–2	Vancouver Whitecaps FC	Commerce City, Colorado
19:00 MDT	Castillo 41'	Report	Techera 17'; Reyna 39'	Stadium: Dick's Sporting Goods Park; Attendance: 16,746

June 9, 2018 13	Houston Dynamo	2–0	Colorado Rapids	Houston, Texas
19:00 MDT	Martinez 30'; Manotas 36' (pen.)	Report		Stadium: BBVA Compass Stadium; Attendance: 16,058; Referee: Drew Fischer

June 13, 2018 14	Colorado Rapids	2–2	Chicago Fire	Commerce City, Colorado
19:00 MDT	Badji 7'; Smith 15'	Report	Wilson 21'; Katai 24'	Stadium: Dick's Sporting Goods Park; Attendance: 16,068; Referee: José Carlos Rivero

June 23, 2018 15	Colorado Rapids	3–2	Minnesota United FC	Commerce City, Colorado
19:00 MDT	Castillo 50'; Mason 74'; Smith 90+7'	Report	Ibarra 20'; Ramirez 65'	Stadium: Dick's Sporting Goods Park

July 1, 2018 16	Vancouver Whitecaps FC	0–1	Colorado Rapids	Vancouver, British Columbia
17:00 MDT		Report	de Jong 43' (o.g.)	Stadium: BC Place

July 4, 2018 17	Colorado Rapids	1–2	Seattle Sounders FC	Commerce City, Colorado
19:00 MDT	Nicholson 40'	Report	Bruin 19', 59'	Stadium: Dick's Sporting Goods Park; Attendance: 16,374; Referee: Fotis Bazakos

July 7, 2018 18	Montreal Impact	2–1	Colorado Rapids	Montreal, Quebec
17:30 MDT	Taider 55', 56'	Report	Badji 78'	Stadium: Stade Saputo

July 14, 2018 19	Colorado Rapids	0–0	Houston Dynamo	Commerce City, Colorado
19:00 MDT		Report		Stadium: Dick's Sporting Goods Park; Attendance: 14,327; Referee: Ted Unkel

July 21, 2018 20	Real Salt Lake	2–2	Colorado Rapids	Sandy, Utah
20:00 MDT	Kreilach 11'; Plata 17'	Report	McBean 33' (pen.); Serna 88'	Stadium: Rio Tinto Stadium; Attendance: 19,207

July 28, 2018 21	D.C. United	2–1	Colorado Rapids	Washington, D.C.
17:00 MDT	Rooney 33'; Jackson 90' (o.g.)	Report	Acosta 82'	Stadium: Audi Field; Attendance: 18,931

August 4, 2018 22	Colorado Rapids	2–1	LA Galaxy	Commerce City, Colorado
19:00 MDT	Acosta 50'; Nicholson 90'	Report	Alessandrini 33'	Stadium: Dick's Sporting Goods Park; Attendance: 17,837; Referee: Sorin Stoica

August 11, 2018 23	Colorado Rapids	2–1	San Jose Earthquakes	Commerce City, Colorado
19:00 MDT	Smith 24'; Boateng 90+3'	Report	Eriksson 58' (pen.)	Stadium: Dick's Sporting Goods Park; Attendance: 15,383; Referee: Alan Kelly

August 15, 2018 26	LA Galaxy	2–2	Colorado Rapids	Carson, California
15:30 MDT	Cole 59'; Lletget 78'	Report	Castillo 74'; Jackson 82'	Stadium: StubHub Center; Attendance: 16,231

August 19, 2018 24	Los Angeles FC	2–0	Colorado Rapids	Los Angeles, California
20:30 MDT	Nguyen 49'; Rossi 80'	Report		Stadium: Banc of California Stadium; Attendance: 22,000

August 25, 2018 25 (RMC)	Colorado Rapids	0–6	Real Salt Lake	Commerce City, Colorado
19:00 MDT		Report	Kreilach 6'; Savarino 33', 58'; Plata 69'; Baird 74'; Rusnák 86'	Stadium: Dick's Sporting Goods Park; Attendance: 16,669

September 8, 2018 27	Portland Timbers	2–0	Colorado Rapids	Portland, Oregon
20:30 MDT	Ebobisse 45'; Valeri 65'	Report		Stadium: Providence Park; Attendance: 21,144

September 15, 2018 28	Colorado Rapids	0–3	Atlanta United FC	Commerce City, Colorado
13:30 MDT		Report	Almirón 10', 18'; Villalba 37'	Stadium: Dick's Sporting Goods Park; Attendance: 14,788

September 22, 2018 29	Columbus Crew SC	2–1	Colorado Rapids	Columbus, Ohio
17:30 MDT	Zardes 17'; Higuaín 57'	Report	Gashi 26'	Stadium: Mapfre Stadium; Attendance: 19,121

September 29, 2018 30	Seattle Sounders FC	4–0	Colorado Rapids	Seattle, Washington
14:00 MDT	Ruidíaz 22', 73'; Lodeiro 52' (pen.); Rodríguez 80'	Report		Stadium: CenturyLink Stadium; Attendance: 40,042; Referee: Nima Saghafi

October 6, 2018 31	Colorado Rapids	0–3	Los Angeles FC	Commerce City, Colorado
19:00 MDT		Report	Zimmerman 15' Diomande 42', 48'	Stadium: Dick's Sporting Goods Park; Attendance: 15,369; Referee: Armando Villarreal

October 13, 2018 32	Minnesota United FC	0–2	Colorado Rapids	Minneapolis, Minnesota
12:00 MDT		Report	Boli 61'; Jackson 90+7'	Stadium: TCF Bank Stadium; Attendance: 19,733; Referee: Guido Gonzales, Jr

October 21, 2018 33	San Jose Earthquakes	0–0	Colorado Rapids	San Jose, California
15:00 MDT		Report		Stadium: Avaya Stadium; Attendance: 17,474; Referee: Tim Ford

October 28, 2018 34	Colorado Rapids	2–1	FC Dallas	Commerce City, Colorado
14:30 MDT	Bassett 80'; Smith 84'	Report	Urruti 18'	Stadium: Dick's Sporting Goods Park

=== U.S. Open Cup ===
June 6, 2018 Fourth	Nashville SC (Tennessee)	2–0	Colorado Rapids	Nashville, Tennessee
17:30	Azira 39' (o.g.); Mensah 78'	Report		Stadium: Vanderbilt Stadium; Referee: Kevin Broadley

=== CONCACAF Champions League ===
==== Round of 16 ====
February 20 First leg	Colorado Rapids (United States)	0–2	(Canada) Toronto FC	Commerce City, United States
20:00 MST	Price (yellow card) 28'; Castillo (yellow card) 69'	Report; Box Score	Osorio 55'; Giovinco 73'; Bradley (yellow card) 86'	Stadium: Dick's Sporting Goods Park; Attendance: 2,673; Referee: Kimbell Ward (Saint Kitts and Nevis)

February 27 Second leg	Toronto FC (Canada)	0–0 (2–0 agg.)	(United States) Colorado Rapids	Toronto, Canada
18:00 MST		Report		Stadium: BMO Field; Attendance: 23,383; Referee: Luis Enrique Santander (Mexico)

== Statistics ==
=== Top scorers ===
Place	Position	Number	Name	MLS	U.S. Open Cup	Total
1	FW	14	(Senegal) Dominique Badji	7	0	7
2	DF	5	(New Zealand) Tommy Smith	4	0	4
3	DF	2	(United States) Edgar Castillo	3	0	3
3	FW	12	(United States) Niki Jackson	3	0	3
3	FW	10	(Republic of Ireland) Joe Mason	3	0	3
6	MF	11	(Albania) Shkëlzen Gashi	2	0	2
6	MF	10	(United States) Kellyn Acosta	2	0	2
6	MF	28	(Scotland) Sam Nicholson	2	0	2
6	FW	32	(United States) Jack McBean	2	0	2
6	FW	9	(Ivory Coast) Yannick Boli	2	0	2
11	MF	19	(England) Jack Price	1	0	1
11	MF	21	(Ghana) Nana Boateng	1	0	1
11	MF	17	(United States) Dillon Serna	1	0	1
11	MF	26	(United States) Cole Bassett	1	0	1
Total				34	0	34

As of 28 October 2018.
