= 2016 Colorado Rapids season =

Colorado Rapids
2016 season
- Chairman: Stan Kroenke
- Head coach: Pablo Mastroeni
- Major League Soccer: Conference: 2nd Overall: 2nd
- MLS Cup Playoffs: Conference Finals
- U.S. Open Cup: Fifth round
- Rocky Mountain Cup: Runners-up
- Top goalscorer: League: Shkëlzen Gashi (9); All: Shkëlzen Gashi (9)
- Highest home attendance: 18,759 (Jul. 4 vs. POR)
- Lowest home attendance: 10,670 (Apr. 16 vs. RBNY)
- Average home league attendance: 16,278
Home colors	Away colors

The 2016 Colorado Rapids season was the club's 21st season of existence, and their 21st season in Major League Soccer, the top tier of the American and Canadian soccer pyramids.

The 2016 season was, at the time, the Rapids' most successful regular season in franchise history. During the season, the Rapids finished 2nd in the Western Conference and 2nd overall in the regular season, besting their previous best regular season finish of 3rd in the Western Conference and 4th overall in 2002. In 2021 they also finished second overall. The Rapids finished undefeated at home with a record of 11-0-6. At home, they conceded only 7 goals, setting a new MLS record with a 0.41 goals-against average. The season also featured a franchise-record 15 match unbeaten streak. After finishing at the bottom of the table for the 2015, the season was hallmarked as a surprising turnaround. The team was bolstered by incoming transfer targets Tim Howard, Shkëlzen Gashi, Marco Pappa and Jermaine Jones. Outside of the regular season, the Rapids reached the fifth round of the U.S. Open Cup before falling to eventual champions, FC Dallas. As of 2025, this is the last time the Rapids have won an MLS Cup playoff game.

== Club ==
Note: Flags indicate national team as defined under FIFA eligibility rules; some limited exceptions apply. Players may hold more than one non-FIFA nationality. Squad correct as of May 13, 2016.

No.	Pos.	Nation	Player
1	GK	USA	Tim Howard (DP)
3	DF	USA	Eric Miller
4	DF	USA	Marc Burch
5	DF	TTO	Mekeil Williams
6	MF	USA	Sam Cronin
7	MF	FRA	Sébastien Le Toux
8	MF	USA	Dillon Powers
9	FW	IRL	Kevin Doyle (DP)
10	MF	GUA	Marco Pappa
11	FW	ALB	Shkëlzen Gashi (DP)
13	FW	USA	Jermaine Jones
14	FW	SEN	Dominique Badji
17	MF	USA	Dillon Serna (HGP)
18	GK	USA	Zac MacMath
19	FW	USA	Conor Doyle
20	DF	USA	Joseph Greenspan
22	MF	UGA	Micheal Azira
23	DF	USA	Bobby Burling
24	DF	IRL	Sean St Ledger
33	MF	USA	Jared Watts
44	DF	SWE	Axel Sjöberg
94	DF	USA	Marlon Hairston (GA)

== Transfers ==
For transfers in, dates listed are when Colorado officially signed the players to the roster. Transactions where only the rights to the players are acquired are not listed. For transfers out, dates listed are when Colorado officially removed the players from its roster, not when they signed with another club. If a player later signed with another club, his new club will be noted, but the date listed here remains the one when he was officially removed from the Rapids roster.

=== In ===
No.	Pos.	Player	Transferred from	Fee/notes	Date	Source
22	MF	(Uganda) Michael Azira	(United States) Seattle Sounders FC	Waiver Draft	December 9, 2015	
18	GK	(United States) Zac MacMath	(United States) Philadelphia Union	Trade	December 11, 2015	
10	MF	(Guatemala) Marco Pappa	(United States) Seattle Sounders FC	Trade	December 15, 2015	
16	MF	(United States) Zach Pfeffer	(United States) Philadelphia Union	Trade	January 15, 2016	
11	FW	(Albania) Shkëlzen Gashi	(Switzerland) FC Basel	Transfer, undisclosed	February 1, 2016	
5	DF	(Trinidad and Tobago) Mekeil Williams	(Guatemala) Antigua GFC	Transfer, Discovery Signing	February 4, 2016	
19	FW	(United States) Conor Doyle	(United States) D.C. United	Traded for a 3rd Round pick in the 2016 MLS SuperDraft	February 9, 2016	
13	FW	(United States) Jermaine Jones	(United States) New England Revolution	Trade	March 4, 2016	
1	GK	(United States) Tim Howard	(England) Everton	Free	June 28, 2016	
7	MF	(France) Sébastien Le Toux	(United States) Philadelphia Union	Trade	August 3, 2016	

==== Draft picks ====
Draft picks are not automatically signed to the team roster. Only those who are signed to a contract will be listed as transfers in. Only trades involving draft picks and executed after the start of 2015 MLS SuperDraft will be listed in the notes.

Date	Player	Number	Position	Previous club	Notes	Ref
January 14, 2016	(Ghana) Emmanuel Appiah		MF	(United States) Cincinnati Bearcats	MLS SuperDraft 1st Round Pick (#15); Pick acquired from Chicago Fire through Seattle Sounders FC.	
January 14, 2016	(Costa Rica) Dennis Castillo		DF	(United States) VCU Rams	MLS SuperDraft 2nd Round Pick (#37); Pick acquired from Dallas FC.	
January 19, 2016	(United States) Chris Frouchauer		GK	(United States) Ohio State Buckeyes	MLS SuperDraft 3rd Round Pick (#43).	
January 19, 2016	(United States) Javan Torre		FW	(United States) UCLA Bruins	MLS SuperDraft 3rd Round Pick (#56)	
January 19, 2016	(France) Bradley Kamdem		DF	(United States) UNLV Rebels	MLS SuperDraft 3rd Round Pick (#58)	
January 19, 2016	(Democratic Republic of the Congo) John Manga		FW	(United States) Cincinnati Bearcats	MLS SuperDraft 4th Round Pick (#63)	

=== Out ===
No.	Pos.	Player	Transferred to	Fee/notes	Date	Source
16	DF	(United States) James Riley		Waived	December 3, 2015	
3	DF	(United States) Drew Moor	(Canada) Toronto FC	Waived	December 3, 2015	
2	MF	(United States) Nick LaBrocca	(United States) Chicago Fire	Waived	December 3, 2015	
22	MF	(Argentina) Lucas Pittinari	(Argentina) Belgrano	Loan ended, option declined	December 3, 2015	
7	FW	(Uruguay) Vicente Sánchez	(Uruguay) Defensor Sporting	Waived	December 3, 2015	
57	MF	(United States) Carlos Alvarez	(United States) San Antonio FC	Waived	December 3, 2015	
19	FW	(Cameroon) Charles Eloundou	(United States) Jacksonville Armada	Waived	December 3, 2015	
10	FW	(Panama) Gabriel Torres	(Venezuela) Zamora	Free Transfer	December 3, 2015	
5	DF	(United States) Michael Harrington	(United States) Chicago Fire	Waived	December 3, 2015	
1	GK	(United States) Clint Irwin	(Canada) Toronto FC	Received allocation money, #56 in 2016 MLS SuperDraft, conditional pick in 2017 MLS SuperDraft	January 18, 2016	
31	DF	(Honduras) Maynor Figueroa	(United States) FC Dallas	Traded for allocation money	January 26, 2016	
5	MF	(Brazil) Marcelo Sarvas	(United States) D.C. United	Traded for allocation money	February 1, 2016	
30	GK	(United States) Chris Froschauer		Waived	June 30, 2016	
	MF	(Ghana) Emmanuel Appiah	(United States) Sporting Kansas City	Waived	June 30, 2016	
21	FW	(Argentina) Luis Solignac	(United States) Chicago Fire	Traded	August 3, 2016	

=== Loaned out ===
No.	Pos.	Player	Loaned to	Date	Source
15	MF	(Argentina) Juan Ramirez	(Argentina) Talleres	August 8, 2016	
29	FW	(United States) Caleb Calvert	(United States) Charlotte Independence	March 15, 2016	
	MF	(Ghana) Emmanuel Appiah	(United States) Charlotte Independence	March 15, 2016	
12	GK	(United States) John Berner	(United States) Charlotte Independence	April 11, 2016	
16	MF	(United States) Zach Pfeffer	(United States) Charlotte Independence	April 28, 2016	
26	DF	(Costa Rica) Dennis Castillo	(United States) Charlotte Independence	April 28, 2016	

== Competitions ==
=== Preseason ===
February 4, 2016 Scrimmage	Seongnam FC	2–4	Colorado Rapids	Chula Vista, California, U.S.
				Stadium: United States Olympic Training Center

February 8, 2016 Scrimmage	Orange County Blues FC	0–2	Colorado Rapids	Chula Vista, California, U.S.
				Stadium: United States Olympic Training Center

February 13, 2016 Friendly	Sacramento Republic FC	0–1	Colorado Rapids	Sacramento, California, U.S.
5:00 PM PST			Cochran 86'	Stadium: Bonney Field; Attendance: 10,240

February 17, 2016 2016 Desert Diamond Cup	Swope Park Rangers	3–1	Colorado Rapids	Tucson, Arizona, U.S.
5:30 PM MST	Tyrpak 1'; VanCompernolle (yellow card) 18'; Sanchez 63'; Little 90'		Badji 17'; Watts (yellow card) 44'	Stadium: Kino Veterans Memorial Stadium

February 20, 2016 2016 Desert Diamond Cup	Houston Dynamo	0–0	Colorado Rapids	Tucson, Arizona, U.S.
7:00 PM MST				Stadium: Kino Veterans Memorial Stadium

February 24, 2016 2016 Desert Diamond Cup	Sporting Kansas City	4–1	Colorado Rapids	Tucson, Arizona, U.S.
8:00 PM MST	Nagamura 17' (pen.), 19' (pen.); Dwyer 68' (pen.); Sinovic 72'		Pfeffer 82'	Stadium: Kino Veterans Memorial Stadium

February 27, 2016 2016 Desert Diamond Cup	Arizona United SC	0–3	Colorado Rapids	Tucson, Arizona, U.S.
6:30 PM MST			Ringhof 17' (o.g.); Doyle 31'; Gashi 83'	Stadium: Kino Veterans Memorial Stadium; Referee: Ismail Elfath

=== MLS ===
March 6, 2016 1	San Jose Earthquakes	1–0	Colorado Rapids	San Jose, California, U.S.
2:00 PM PST	Wondolowski 46'; Godoy (yellow card) 72'; Quintero (yellow card) 75'		Azira (yellow card) 43'; Powers (yellow card) 86'	Stadium: Avaya Stadium; Attendance: 18,000; Referee: Ted Unkel

March 12, 2016 2	Colorado Rapids	1–0	LA Galaxy	Commerce City, Colorado, U.S.
5:00 PM MST	Burch (yellow card) 45'; Watts (yellow card) 89'; K. Doyle (yellow card) 90+1'; Pappa 90+5'	Report	Gerrard (yellow card) 43'; Steres (yellow card) 50'; Van Damme (yellow card) 72'; Boateng (yellow card) 82'	Stadium: Dick's Sporting Goods Park; Attendance: 17,474; Referee: Fotis Bazakos

March 20, 2016 3	D.C. United	1–1	Colorado Rapids	Washington, D.C., U.S.
5:00 PM EDT	Espindola 80'; Sarvas (yellow card) 86'	Report	Watts (yellow card) 19'; Powers (yellow card) 45+1' (goal) 69'; Sjöberg (yellow card) 49'; Azira (yellow card) 43'	Stadium: RFK Memorial Stadium; Attendance: 15,344; Referee: Chris Penso

April 2, 2016 4	Colorado Rapids	1–0	Toronto FC	Commerce City, Colorado, U.S.
6:00 PM MDT	Solignac 18'; Burch (yellow card) 45'; Burling (yellow card) 59'; C. Doyle (yellow card) 82'	Report	Cheyrou (yellow card) 11' (red card) 13'; Perquis (yellow card) 48'	Stadium: Dick's Sporting Goods Park; Attendance: 10,772; Referee: Ismail Elfath

April 9, 2016 5 Rocky Mountain Cup	Real Salt Lake	1–0	Colorado Rapids	Sandy, Utah, U.S.
7:30 PM MDT	Plata 72'; Yura Movsisyan (yellow card) 83'	Report	Burling (yellow card) 61'; Miller (yellow card) 90+3'	Stadium: Rio Tinto Stadium; Attendance: 19,224; Referee: Drew Fischer

April 13, 2016 6	Sporting Kansas City	1–2	Colorado Rapids	Kansas City, Kansas, U.S.
7:30 PM CDT	Rubio (yellow card) 52'; Dwyer 77'	Report	Pappa (yellow card) 33'; Solignac 41'; Serna (yellow card) 57'; Burch (yellow card) 62'; Gashi 82'	Stadium: Children's Mercy Park; Attendance: 19,168; Referee: Robert Sibiga

April 16, 2016 7	Colorado Rapids	2–1	New York Red Bulls	Commerce City, Colorado, U.S.
7:00 PM MDT	Jones 21'; Badji 82'; Doyle (yellow card) 90+1'	Report	Grella (yellow card) 36'; Zubar 60' (yellow card) 79'; Duvall (yellow card) 64'; Lawrence (yellow card) 84'	Stadium: Dick's Sporting Goods Park; Attendance: 10,670; Referee: Ricardo Salazar

April 23, 2016 8	Colorado Rapids	3–1	Seattle Sounders FC	Commerce City, Colorado, U.S.
7:00 PM MDT	Badji (yellow card) 1'; Williams (yellow card) 14'; Jones 20' (yellow card) 20'; Miller (yellow card) 47'; Solignac 51'; Doyle 86'	Report	Morris 63'; Evans (yellow card) 86' (yellow card) 86' (red card)	Stadium: Dick's Sporting Goods Park; Attendance: 17,294; Referee: Jorge Gonzalez

April 30, 2016 9	Montreal Impact	2–2	Colorado Rapids	Montreal, Quebec, Canada
4:00 PM EDT	Drogba 9'; Tissot 50'; Ciman (yellow card) 66'	Report	Gashi 47' (yellow card) 78'; Sjöberg (yellow card) 61'; Burling 72'	Stadium: Saputo Stadium; Attendance: 20,801; Referee: Fotis Bazakos

May 7, 2016 10; Rocky Mountain Cup	Colorado Rapids	1–0	Real Salt Lake	Commerce City, Colorado, U.S.
7:00 PM MDT	Williams (yellow card) 15'; Jones 47' (yellow card) 53'; Gashi (yellow card) 81'; MacMath (yellow card) 90+1'	Report	Sunny (yellow card) 29'; Beltran (yellow card) 79'	Stadium: Dick's Sporting Goods Park; Attendance: 14,638; Referee: Jair Marrufo

May 11, 2016 11	Colorado Rapids	1–0	Sporting Kansas City	Commerce City, Colorado, U.S.
7:00 PM MDT	Badji (yellow card) 33'; Sjöberg (yellow card) 75'; Serna 78'	Report	Opara (yellow card) 56' (yellow-red card) 76'; Olum (yellow card) 59'; Dwyer (yellow card) 61'	Stadium: Dick's Sporting Goods Park; Attendance: 12,857; Referee: Jose Carlos Rivero

May 14, 2016 12	Columbus Crew SC	1–1	Colorado Rapids	Columbus, Ohio, U.S.
7:30 PM EDT	Mabwati 23'	Report	Doyle (yellow card) 10' (goal) 55'; Gashi (yellow card) 63'	Stadium: MAPFRE Stadium; Attendance: 15,203; Referee: Chris Penso

May 21, 2016 13	Seattle Sounders FC	0–1	Colorado Rapids	Seattle, Washington, U.S.
7:00 PM PDT			Sjöberg 43'; Jones (yellow card) 44'; Burch (yellow card) 60'; Williams (yellow card) 79'	Stadium: CenturyLink Field; Attendance: 41,028; Referee: Ismail Elfath

May 28, 2016 14	Colorado Rapids	1–1	Philadelphia Union	Commerce City, Colorado, U.S.
7:00 PM MDT	Cronin 87'		Carroll 90+2'	Stadium: Dick's Sporting Goods Park; Attendance: 18,015; Referee: Hilario Grajeda ()

June 18, 2016 15	Colorado Rapids	2–1	Chicago Fire	Commerce City, Colorado, U.S.
7:00 PM MDT	Doyle 57'; Pappa 89'; Burch (yellow card) 90+4'		Ramos (yellow card) 67'; Calistri 81'	Stadium: Dick's Sporting Goods Park; Attendance: 18,103; Referee: Juan Guzman (United States)

June 22, 2016 16	LA Galaxy	0–0	Colorado Rapids	Carson, California, U.S.
7:30 PM PDT		[]		Stadium: StubHub Center; Attendance: 21,884

July 4, 2016 17	Colorado Rapids	0–0	Portland Timbers	Commerce City, Colorado, U.S.
7:00 PM MDT		[]		Stadium: Dick's Sporting Goods Park; Attendance: 18,759

July 8, 2016 18	Vancouver Whitecaps FC	2–2	Colorado Rapids	Vancouver, British Columbia, Canada
7:00 PM PDT		[]		Stadium: BC Place; Attendance: 22,120

July 16, 2016 19	Colorado Rapids	1–0	Sporting Kansas City	Commerce City, Colorado, U.S.
7:00 PM MDT		[]		Stadium: Dick's Sporting Goods Park; Attendance: 18,461

July 23, 2016 20	Colorado Rapids	1–1	FC Dallas	Commerce City, Colorado, U.S.
7:00 PM MDT		[]		Stadium: Dick's Sporting Goods Park; Attendance: 18,178

July 30, 2016 21	New York City FC	5–1	Colorado Rapids	New York, New York, U.S.
3:00 PM EDT	Lampard 28', 81', 84' (pen.); Taylor 42'; Mendoza 75'	[]	Azira (yellow card) 21' (yellow card) 37' (red card); Gashi 90+2'	Stadium: Yankee Stadium; Attendance: 25,711; Referee: Baldomero Toledo

August 6, 2016 22	Colorado Rapids	2–0	Vancouver Whitecaps FC	Commerce City, Colorado, U.S.
7:00 PM MDT	Hairston 44'; Badji 60'	[]		Stadium: Dick's Sporting Goods Park; Attendance: 17,526; Referee: Chris Penso

August 13, 2016 23	LA Galaxy	1–1	Colorado Rapids	Carson, California, U.S.
7:30 PM PDT	Steres 62'	[]	Gashi 51'	Stadium: StubHub Center; Attendance: 25,667; Referee: Juan Guzman

August 20, 2016 24	Colorado Rapids	0–0	Orlando City SC	Commerce City, Colorado, U.S.
7:00 PM MDT		[]		Stadium: Dick's Sporting Goods Park; Attendance: 16,813

August 26, 2016 25; Rocky Mountain Cup	Real Salt Lake	2–1	Colorado Rapids	Sandy, Utah, U.S.
6:00 PM MDT	Movsisyan 39', 48'	Report	Gashi 5'; Powers (yellow card) 60'; Burch (yellow card) 84'; Howard (yellow card) 90+2'	Stadium: Rio Tinto Stadium; Attendance: 20,134; Referee: Jair Marrufo

September 3, 2016 26	New England Revolution	2–0	Colorado Rapids	Foxborough, Massachusetts, U.S.
7:30 PM EDT	Agudelo 12'; Tierney 49'	Report	Cronin (yellow card) 22'; Badji (yellow card) 29'; MacMath (yellow card) 31'; Burling (yellow card) 90+3'	Stadium: Gillette Stadium; Attendance: 15,046; Referee: Alan Kelly

September 10, 2016 27	FC Dallas	0–1	Colorado Rapids	Frisco, Texas, U.S.
8:00 PM CDT	Urruti (yellow card) 90+6'	Report	Sjöberg (yellow card) 30'; Burch (yellow card) 51'; Badji 52'; Azira (yellow card) 68'; Hairston (yellow card) 81'	Stadium: Toyota Stadium; Attendance: 14,468; Referee: Robert Sibiga

September 17, 2016 28	Colorado Rapids	0–0	San Jose Earthquakes	Commerce City, Colorado, U.S.
7:00 PM MDT	Cronin (yellow card) 35'; Powers (yellow card) 38'; Sjöberg (yellow card) 38'	Report		Stadium: Dick's Sporting Goods Park; Attendance: 17,645; Referee: Armando Villarreal

September 24, 2016 29	Vancouver Whitecaps FC	3–3	Colorado Rapids	Vancouver, British Columbia, Canada
4:00 PM PDT	Watson 51' (red card) 56'; Morales 70'; Harvey (yellow card) 74'; Laba (yellow card) 77'; Hurtado 90+3'	Report	Badji 8' (yellow card) 87'; Azira (yellow card) 39'; Gashi 57' (pen.), 75'	Stadium: BC Place; Attendance: 21,851; Referee: Baldomero Toledo

October 1, 2016 30	Colorado Rapids	1–0	Portland Timbers	Commerce City, Colorado, U.S.
6:00 PM PDT	Badji (yellow card) 8'; Le Toux 63' (yellow card) 83'; MacMath (yellow card) 77'; Burch (yellow card) 78'; Cronin (yellow card) 90+1'; Williams (yellow card) 90+2'	Report	Chara (yellow card) 38'; Adi (yellow card) 73'	Stadium: Dick's Sporting Goods Park; Attendance: 17,554; Referee: Allen Chapman

October 8, 2016 31	Houston Dynamo	2–3	Colorado Rapids	Houston, Texas, U.S.
7:30 PM CDT	Manotas 45', 81'; Alex (yellow card) 90+1'	Report	Badji 12', 54'; Gashi 79'; Cronin (yellow card) 83'; Azira (yellow card) 90+1'	Stadium: BBVA Compass Stadium; Attendance: 18,400; Referee: Jose Carlos Rivero

October 13, 2016 32	Colorado Rapids	2–1	San Jose Earthquakes	Commerce City, Colorado, U.S.
7:00 PM MDT	Doyle 38', 73' (pen.) (yellow card) 84'	Report	Wondolowski 57' (pen.); Bernárdez (yellow card) 86'	Stadium: Dick's Sporting Goods Park; Attendance: 13,516; Referee: Robert Sibiga

October 16, 2016 33	Portland Timbers	1–0	Colorado Rapids	Portland, Oregon, U.S.
4:00 PM PDT	Ridgewell (yellow card) 21'; Adi 35' (pen.); Chara (yellow card) 50'; Andriuškevičius (yellow card) 90+5'	Report	Calvert (yellow card) 26'; Williams (yellow card) 32'; Burling (yellow card) 33'; Azira (yellow card) 79'; Doyle (yellow card) 89'; Watts (yellow card) 90+3'	Stadium: Providence Park; Attendance: 21,144; Referee: Silviu Petrescu

October 23, 2016 34	Colorado Rapids	1–1	Houston Dynamo	Commerce City, Colorado, U.S.
2:00 PM MDT	Gashi 67'; Burch (yellow card) 90+4'	Report	Wenger 20'; García (yellow card) 74'; Williams (yellow card) 90+4'	Stadium: Dick's Sporting Goods Park; Attendance: 18,446; Referee: Ismail Elfath

=== MLS Cup Playoffs ===
==== Conference semifinals ====
October 30, 2016 First leg	LA Galaxy	1–0	Colorado Rapids	Carson, California
	Van Damme (yellow card) 45'; Giovani 55'; Cole (yellow card) 67'	Report	Badji (yellow card) 12'; Watts (yellow card) 50'; Jones (yellow card) 60'	Stadium: StubHub Center; Attendance: 24,487; Referee: Drew Fischer

November 6, 2016 Second leg	Colorado Rapids	1–0 (a.e.t.) (1–1 agg.) (3–1 p)	LA Galaxy	Commerce City, Colorado, U.S.
12:00 PM MDT	Gashi 36'; Cronin (yellow card) 57'	Report		Stadium: Dick's Sporting Goods Park; Attendance: 17,782; Referee: Mark Geiger
	Penalties
	Doyle (penalty scored); Le Toux (penalty scored); Pappa (penalty scored)		(penalty scored) Gerrard; (penalty missed) Giovani; (penalty missed) Cole; (penalty missed) Larentowicz

==== Conference finals ====
November 20, 2016 First leg	Seattle Sounders FC	2–1	Colorado Rapids	Seattle, Washington, U.S.
20:35 MST	Morris 19'; Lodeiro 61' (pen.)	Report	Doyle 13' (yellow card) 58'; Burch (yellow card) 34'; Cronin (yellow card) 67'	Stadium: CenturyLink Field; Attendance: 42,774; Referee: Chris Penso

November 27, 2016 Second leg	Colorado Rapids	0–1	Seattle Sounders FC	Commerce City, Colorado, U.S.
14:00 MST	Burch (yellow card) 68'	Report	Torres (yellow card) 14'; Morris 56'	Stadium: Dick's Sporting Goods Park; Attendance: 17,695; Referee: Ricardo Salazar

=== U.S. Open Cup ===
June 14, 2016 Fourth round	Colorado Rapids	1–0	Colorado Springs Switchbacks FC	Commerce City, Colorado, U.S.
7:00 PM MDT	Powers (yellow card) 51'; Serna 84'	Report		Stadium: Dick's Sporting Goods Park

June 29, 2016 Fifth round	FC Dallas	2–1	Colorado Rapids	Frisco, Texas, U.S
6:30 PM MDT				Stadium: Toyota Stadium

=== Standings ===
==== Western Conference standings ====
Pos	Team	Pld	W	L	T	GF	GA	GD	Pts	Qualification
1	FC Dallas	34	17	8	9	50	40	+10	60	Qualification for the conference semifinals
2	Colorado Rapids	34	15	6	13	39	32	+7	58	Qualification for the conference semifinals
3	LA Galaxy	34	12	6	16	54	39	+15	52	Qualification for the knockout round
4	Seattle Sounders FC	34	14	14	6	44	43	+1	48	Qualification for the knockout round
5	Sporting Kansas City	34	13	13	8	42	41	+1	47	Qualification for the knockout round

Source: MLS

==== Overall table ====
Note: the table below has no impact on playoff qualification and is used solely for determining host of the MLS Cup, certain CCL spots, and 2016 MLS draft. The conference tables are the sole determinant for teams qualifying to the playoffs

Pos	Team	Pld	W	L	T	GF	GA	GD	Pts	Qualification
1	FC Dallas (S, U)	34	17	8	9	50	40	+10	60	Qualification for the CONCACAF Champions League
2	Colorado Rapids	34	15	6	13	39	32	+7	58	Qualification for the CONCACAF Champions League
3	New York Red Bulls	34	16	9	9	61	44	+17	57	Qualification for the CONCACAF Champions League
4	New York City FC	34	15	10	9	62	57	+5	54	
5	Toronto FC (V)	34	14	9	11	51	39	+12	53	Qualification for the CONCACAF Champions League

Source: MLS
Rules for classification: 1) points; 2) total wins; 3) total goal differential; 4) total goals scored;
(S) Supporters' Shield winners; (U) U.S. Open Cup winners; (V) Canadian Championship winners

== Statistics ==
=== Goals and assists ===
No.	Pos.	Name	MLS		MLS Cup		U.S. Open Cup		Total	
No.	Pos.	Name	Goals	Assists	Goals	Assists	Goals	Assists	Goals	Assists
11	FW	Shkëlzen Gashi	9	4	1	0	0	0	10	4
14	FW	Dominique Badji	6	4	0	0	1	0	7	4
9	FW	Kevin Doyle	6	2	0	0	0	0	6	2
94	MF	Marlon Hairston	3	6	0	0	0	1	3	7
13	MF	Jermaine Jones	3	2	0	0	0	0	3	2
—N/a	FW	Luis Solignac	3	2	0	0	0	0	3	2
10	MF	Marco Pappa	2	4	0	0	0	0	2	4
44	DF	Axel Sjöberg	2	1	0	0	0	0	2	1
17	MF	Dillon Serna	1	0	0	0	1	0	2	0
8	MF	Dillon Powers	1	4	0	0	0	1	1	5
6	MF	Sam Cronin	1	3	0	1	0	0	1	4
7	MF	Sébastien Le Toux	1	2	0	0	0	0	1	2
23	DF	Bobby Burling	1	0	0	0	0	0	1	0
5	DF	Mekeil Williams	0	4	0	0	0	0	0	4
5	DF	Marc Burch	0	3	0	0	0	0	0	3
26	DF	Dennis Castillo	0	1	0	0	0	0	0	1
3	DF	Eric Miller	0	1	0	0	0	0	0	1
42	MF	Micheal Azira	0	1	0	0	0	0	0	1
