= Jared Watts =

American soccer player (born 1992)

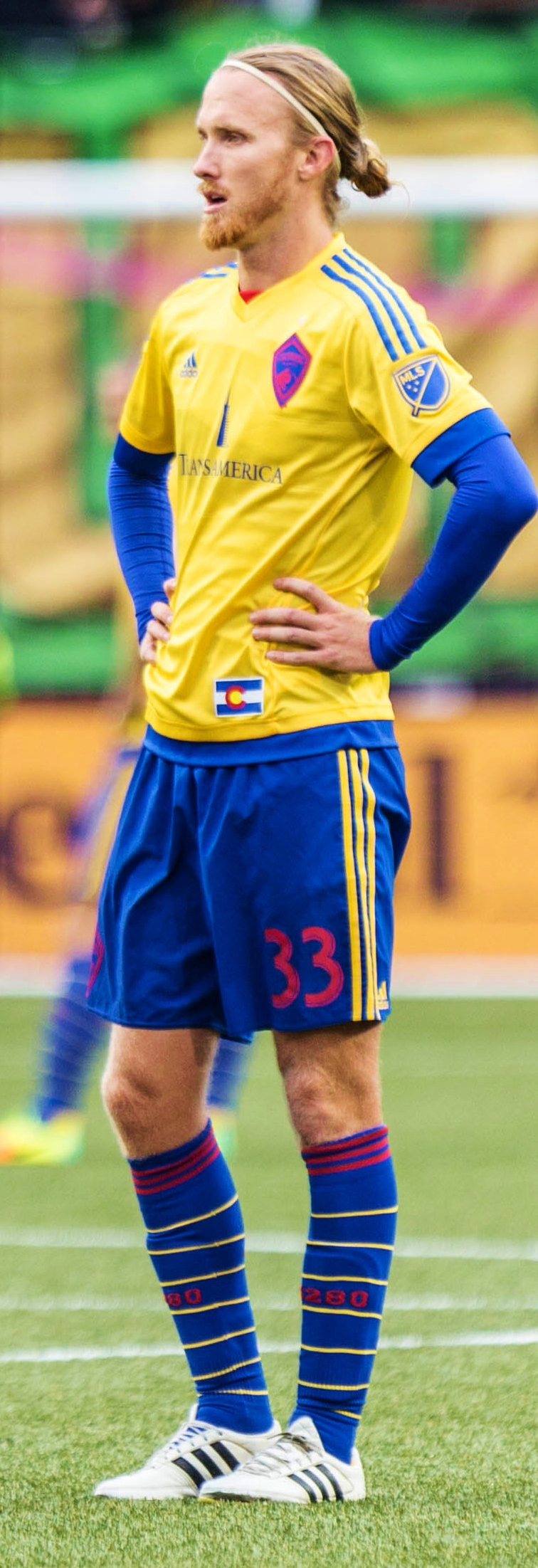
- Watts with Colorado Rapids in 2016

Personal information
- Date of birth: February 3, 1992 (age 34)
- Place of birth: Statesville, North Carolina, United States
- Height: 6 ft 1 in (1.85 m)
- Positions: Defensive midfielder; defender

Youth career
- 2007–2009: IMG Soccer Academy
- 2009–2010: North Meck SC

College career
Years	Team	Apps	(Gls)
2010–2013	Wake Forest Demon Deacons	73	(5)

Senior career*
Years	Team	Apps	(Gls)
2014–2018	Colorado Rapids	71	(1)
2018	Houston Dynamo	7	(0)
2018	→ Rio Grande Valley FC (loan)	1	(0)

International career
2007–2009	United States U17	21	(0)
- * Club domestic league appearances and goals

Jared Watts (born February 3, 1992) is an American retired professional soccer player who played as a defensive midfielder or defender.

== Club career ==
=== Youth career ===
Watts spent time with North Meck SC as well as with the IMG Soccer Academy. He would attend Wake Forest University and was named first team All-Conference on three occasions; 2011, 2012, and 2013.

=== Colorado Rapids ===
Watts was drafted in the second round (33rd overall) of the 2014 MLS SuperDraft by the Colorado Rapids. He made his professional debut on March 29, 2014, against Sporting Kansas City. Watts scored his first professional goal on July 11, 2015, in a 3–1 win over Real Salt Lake. In 2016, Watts was a part of the best defense in MLS and helped the Rapids finish second in the Western Conference. He would help the Rapids reach the Conference finals, where they fell to Seattle Sounders FC.

On March 28, 2018, Watts was traded to Houston Dynamo in exchange for $100,000 of Targeted Allocation Money.

=== Houston Dynamo ===
Watts made his Dynamo debut on May 30, 2018, in a 2–1 loss to Real Salt Lake. He suffered various injuries in 2018, forcing him to miss good chunks of the season.

== International career ==
Watts captained the US at the 2009 FIFA U-17 World Cup in Nigeria. He also has had extensive international experience, seeing time with the U17 and U20 U.S. Youth National Teams. Played and was a captain with the U.S. U17 team.

== Career statistics ==
As of November 18, 2018

Appearances and goals by club, season and competition
Club	Season	League			US Open Cup		Playoffs		Continental		Total	
Club	Season	Division	Apps	Goals	Apps	Goals	Apps	Goals	Apps	Goals	Apps	Goals
Colorado Rapids	2014	MLS	17	0	0	0	"|—		—		17	0
Colorado Rapids	2015	MLS	13	1	1	0	—		—		14	1
Colorado Rapids	2016	MLS	21	0	1	0	4	0	—		26	0
Colorado Rapids	2017	MLS	20	0	1	0	—		—		21	0
Colorado Rapids	2018	MLS	0	0	0	0	—		—		0	0
Colorado Rapids	Total		71	1	3	0	4	0	0	0	78	0
Houston Dynamo	2018	MLS	7	0	0	0	—		—		7	0
RGVFC Toros (loan)	2018	USL	1	0	—		—		—		1	0
Career Total			79	1	3	0	4	0	0	0	86	1

== Honors ==
Houston Dynamo

- US Open Cup: 2018
