= Marc Burch =

American soccer player (born 1984)

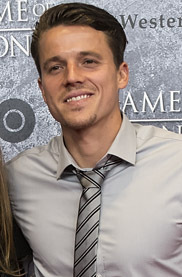
- Burch in 2013

Personal information
- Full name: Marc Burch
- Date of birth: May 7, 1984 (age 42)
- Place of birth: Cincinnati, Ohio, United States
- Height: 6 ft 1 in (1.85 m)
- Position: Defender

College career
Years	Team	Apps	(Gls)
2002–2004	Evansville Purple Aces	55	(7)
2005	Maryland Terrapins	21	(4)

Senior career*
Years	Team	Apps	(Gls)
2004	Cleveland Internationals	7	(0)
2006	LA Galaxy	3	(0)
2006	Columbus Crew	7	(0)
2007–2011	D.C. United	93	(3)
2012–2013	Seattle Sounders FC	49	(0)
2014–2017	Colorado Rapids	61	(1)
2017–2018	Minnesota United FC	21	(0)
2019–2020	Memphis 901 FC	39	(2)

International career
2003	United States U18	4	(0)
2003	United States U20	1	(0)
- * Club domestic league appearances and goals as of October 5, 2020

Marc Burch (born May 7, 1984, in Cincinnati, Ohio) is an American former professional soccer player.

== Career ==
=== College and amateur ===
Burch played college soccer at the University of Evansville for three seasons from 2002 to 2004, scoring seven goals and assisting on 22 along the way, and spent the summer months playing for the Cleveland Internationals in the USL Premier Development League. After the 2004 season he transferred to the University of Maryland, where he would become a crucial member of the Terrapin squad that won the College Cup, even scoring the game-winning goal in the championship against New Mexico.

=== Professional ===
Burch was drafted in the second round, 24th overall, by Los Angeles Galaxy in the 2006 MLS SuperDraft. On July 11, 2006, Burch was traded from Galaxy after appearing in only 3 games. He was sent to Columbus Crew for a second-round pick in the 2007 MLS Supplemental Draft. Burch was traded again on April 4, 2007, to D.C. United for a third-round 2008 MLS Supplemental Draft pick. There he was converted from a striker to a left back.

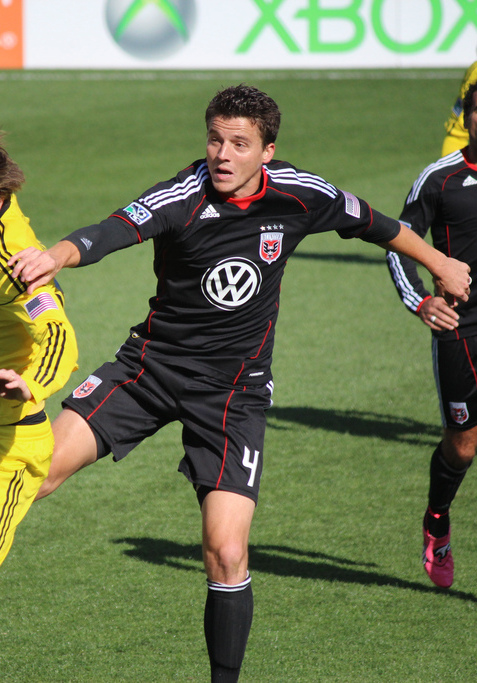
Burch as a DC United player in 2011.

He scored his first professional goal against Toronto FC on September 29, 2007, in a 4–1 win for D.C. In 2008, he scored both goals from 2 free kicks in a 2–0 win for D.C. over Rochester Raging Rhinos in the 2008 U.S. Open Cup third round. It has been pointed out by D.C. United broadcaster Thomas Rongen that Marc Burch "serves great balls" from his position as a left back/left midfielder in D.C. United's formation.

Burch remained with D.C. through the 2011 season. At season's end, the club declined his 2012 contract option and he entered the 2011 MLS Re-Entry Draft. On December 12, 2011, Seattle Sounders FC selected Burch with the first pick of stage two of the Re-Entry Draft. On January 3, 2012, he signed with the Sounders.

On November 10, 2012, MLS Commissioner Don Garber suspended Burch for three games and fined him an undisclosed amount for using unacceptable and offensive language toward Will Johnson in a playoff game against Real Salt Lake. Burch had been caught on camera appearing to use homophobic language towards Johnson. Garber also ordered Burch to attend diversity and sensitivity training. Burch sat out the two-game Western Conference finals games against the Los Angeles Galaxy. Burch quickly issued an apology through Facebook as well as the official Seattle Sounders site.

Following the 2013 season Seattle cut ties with Burch. In December 2013, he was selected by Colorado Rapids in stage one of the 2013 MLS Re-Entry Draft.

On March 31, 2017, Burch and Sam Cronin were traded by Colorado to Minnesota United FC for Josh Gatt, Mohammed Saeid and an international roster spot.

Burch was released by Minnesota at the end of their 2018 season.

On January 30, 2019, Burch joined USL Championship side Memphis 901 FC ahead of their inaugural season. He was also named as the club captain.

== Honors ==
=== D.C. United ===
- Major League Soccer Supporter's Shield (1): 2007
- Lamar Hunt U.S. Open Cup (1): 2008

== Career statistics ==
As of October 13, 2018

Club	Season	League			Playoffs (Note: All appearances in the MLS Cup Playoffs)		Cup		Continental		Total	
Club	Season	Division	Apps	Goals	Apps	Goals	Apps	Goals	Apps	Goals	Apps	Goals
Cleveland Internationals	2004	PDL	7	0	–		–		–		7	0
LA Galaxy	2006	MLS	3	0	–		0	0	0	0	3	0
Columbus Crew	2006	MLS	7	0	–		0	0	–		7	0
D.C. United	2007	MLS	18	1	2	0	0	0	3 (Note: Appearances in the North American SuperLiga)	0	23	1
D.C. United	2008	MLS	28	0	–		3	2	6 (Note: Appearances in the CONCACAF Champions League)	0	37	2
D.C. United	2009	MLS	26	1	–		3	0	3	0	32	1
D.C. United	2010	MLS	4	0	–		1	0	–		5	0
D.C. United	2011	MLS	17	1	–		0	0	–		17	1
D.C. United	Total		93	3	2	0	7	2	12	0	114	5
Seattle Sounders FC	2012	MLS	29	0	2	0	4	0	5	0	40	0
Seattle Sounders FC	2013	MLS	20	0	3	0	1	0	2	0	26	0
Seattle Sounders FC	Total		49	0	5	0	5	0	7	0	66	0
Colorado Rapids	2014	MLS	22	1	–		2	0	–		24	1
Colorado Rapids	2015	MLS	8	0	–		1	0	–		9	0
Colorado Rapids	2016	MLS	28	0	4	0	1	0	–		33	0
Colorado Rapids	2017	MLS	3	0	–		0	0	–		3	0
Colorado Rapids	Total		61	1	4	0	4	0	0	0	69	1
Minnesota United FC	2017	MLS	15	0	–		1	0	–		16	0
Minnesota United FC	2018	MLS	6	0	–		0	0	–		6	0
Minnesota United FC	Total		21	0	0	0	1	0	0	0	22	0
Career total			241	4	11	0	17	2	19	0	288	6
