= Micheal Azira =

Ugandan association footballer (born 1987)

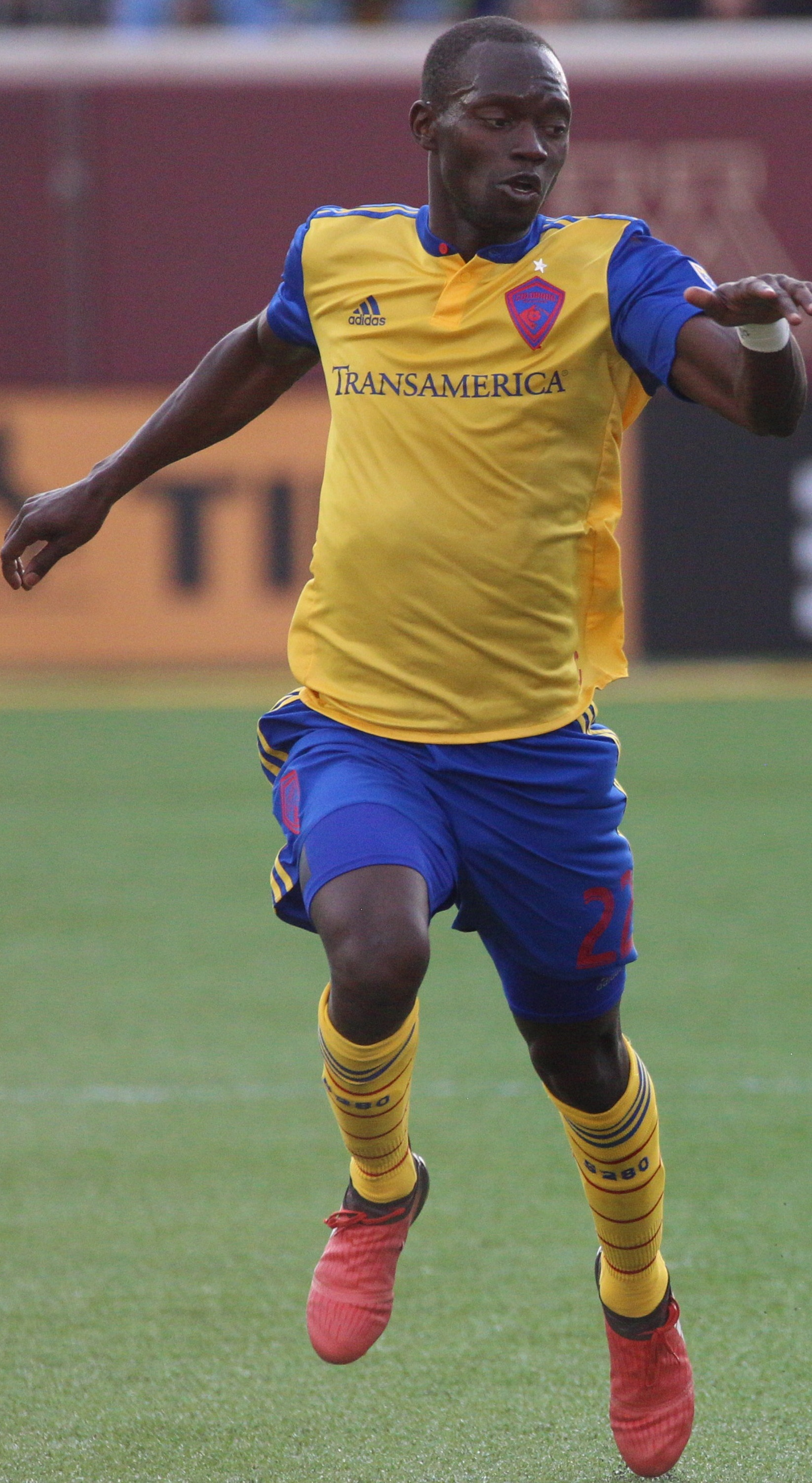

Personal information
- Full name: Micheal Azira
- Date of birth: 22 August 1987 (age 39)
- Place of birth: Kampala, Uganda
- Height: 5 ft 10 in (1.78 m)
- Position: Midfielder

College career
Years	Team	Apps	(Gls)
2008–2010	Lindsey Wilson Blue Raiders		
2011	Mobile Rams		

Senior career*
Years	Team	Apps	(Gls)
2010–2011	Mississippi Brilla	28	(5)
2012–2013	Charleston Battery	40	(5)
2014–2015	Seattle Sounders FC	25	(0)
2015	→ Seattle Sounders FC 2 (loan)	1	(0)
2016–2018	Colorado Rapids	66	(0)
2018	→ Colorado Springs Switchbacks (loan)	1	(0)
2018–2019	Montreal Impact	29	(1)
2019–2020	Chicago Fire	10	(0)
2021–2022	New Mexico United	45	(1)

International career^{‡}
2016–2021	Uganda	10	(0)
- * Club domestic league appearances and goals as of 21 October 2022 ‡ National team caps and goals as of 23 April 2022

Micheal Azira (born 22 August 1987) is a Ugandan professional footballer.

== Professional career ==
Azira signed with Charleston Battery of USL Pro in 2012. He scored the winning goal for Charleston against Wilmington Hammerheads in the 2012 USL Pro Championship match. Azira scored six more goals for the Battery in 2013.

Azira was transferred to Seattle Sounders FC of Major League Soccer on 6 March 2014. He made his MLS debut as a substitute against Montréal on 23 March.

Seattle did not renew Azira's contract following the 2015 season. Azira entered the MLS Waiver Draft in December 2015 and was selected by Colorado Rapids.

Azira was traded by the Rapids on 8 August 2018 to Montreal Impact for a fourth-round draft pick in the 2020 MLS SuperDraft.

Azira was traded again in August 2019, this time to the Chicago Fire. His contract with the club expired at the end of the 2020 season.

On 1 February 2021, Azira signed with USL Championship side New Mexico United.

== International career ==
Azira plays for his birth nation of Uganda. Coach Milutin Sredojević selected Azira for the final 23-man roster for 2017 Africa Cup of Nations.

== Coaching career ==
Azira served as head coach for the Daniel Island Soccer Academy U-16 and U-18 Boyz teams in Charleston, South Carolina. He also served as assistant coach at UMS-Wright in Mobile, Alabama for two seasons, helping lead them to a state title in 2011.

== Personal life ==
Azira previously held a U.S. green card, which qualified him as a domestic player for MLS roster purposes.

On 9 October 2021, Azira was naturalized as an American citizen in Albuquerque.

== Career statistics ==
=== Club ===
As of match played 23 April 2022

Club	Season	League			Domestic Cup		League Cup		Continental		Total	
Club	Season	Division	Apps	Goals	Apps	Goals	Apps	Goals	Apps	Goals	Apps	Goals
Mississippi Brilla	2010	USL PDL	10	0	—		0	0	—		10	0
Mississippi Brilla	2011	USL PDL	15	5	—		2 (Note: Appearance(s) in USL PDL playoffs)	0	—		17	5
Mississippi Brilla	Total		25	5	—		2	0	—		27	5
Charleston Battery	2012	USL Pro	14	0	0	0	3 (Note: Appearance(s) and goal in USL Pro playoffs)	1	—		17	1
Charleston Battery	2013	USL Pro	26	5	2 (Note: Appearance(s) in US Open Cup)	0	2	2	—		30	7
Charleston Battery	Total		40	5	2	0	5	3	—		47	8
Seattle Sounders U-23	2013	USL PDL	1	1	0	0	—		—		1	1
Seattle Sounders FC	2014	MLS	14	0	5	0	4 (Note: Appearance(s) in MLS Cup playoffs)	0	—		23	0
Seattle Sounders FC	2015	MLS	10	0	1	0	2	0	4 (Note: Appearance(s) in CONCACAF Champions League)	0	17	0
Seattle Sounders FC	Total		24	0	6	0	6	0	4	0	40	0
Seattle Sounders U-23 (loan)	2014	USL PDL	6	0	—		—		—		6	0
Tacoma Defiance (loan)	2015	USL	4	0	0	0	0	0	—		4	0
Colorado Rapids	2016	MLS	30	0	1	0	4	0	—		35	0
Colorado Rapids	2017	MLS	30	0	1	1	—		—		31	1
Colorado Rapids	2018	MLS	5	0	1	0	—		1	0	7	0
Colorado Rapids	Total		65	0	3	1	4	0	1	0	73	1
Colorado Springs Switchbacks (loan)	2018	USL	1	0	0	0	—		—		1	0
Montreal Impact	2018	MLS	10	1	0	0	—		—		10	1
Montreal Impact	2019	MLS	19	0	2 (Note: Appearance(s) in Canadian Championship)	0	—		—		21	0
Montreal Impact	Total		29	1	2	0	—		—		31	1
Chicago Fire	2019	MLS	4	0	0	0	—		0	0	4	0
Chicago Fire	2020	MLS	6	0	—		0	0	—		6	0
Chicago Fire	Total		10	0	0	0	0	0	0	0	10	0
New Mexico United	2021	USL Championship	28	1	—		—		—		28	1
New Mexico United	2022	USL Championship	2	0	2	0	—		—		4	0
New Mexico United	Total		30	1	2	0	0	0	—		32	1
Career total			235	13	15	1	17	3	5	0	262	17

=== International ===
As of matches played on 16 July 2019

Uganda national team
Year	Apps	Goals
2016	1	0
2017	4	0
2018	0	0
2019	5	0
Total	10	0

== Honours ==
Charleston Battery

- USL Pro Championship: 2012

Seattle Sounders

- U.S Open Cup: 2014
- Supporters Shield: 2014

== See also ==
- Ugandan Americans
