= Marlon Hairston =

American soccer player (born 1994)

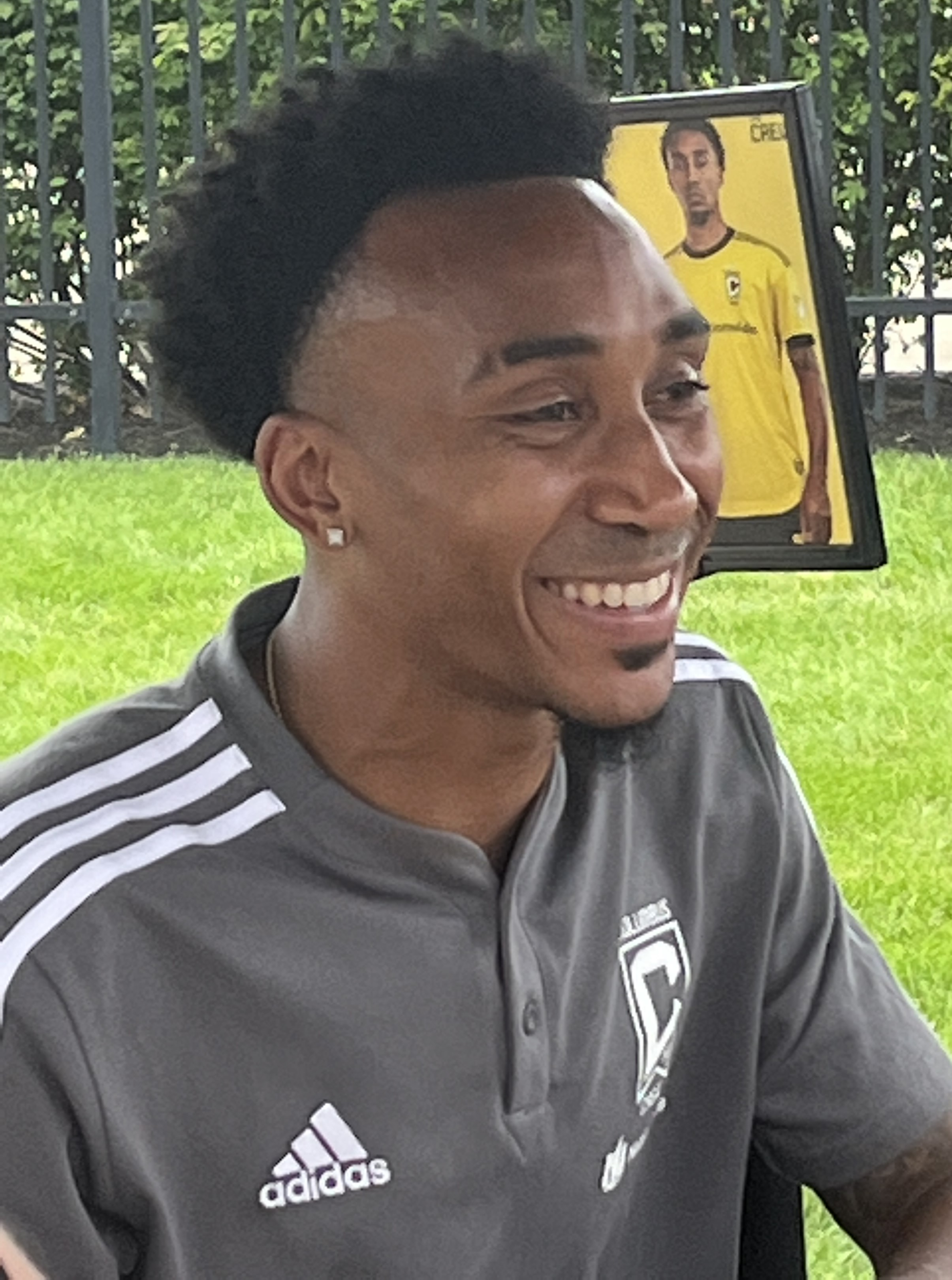
- Hairston with the Columbus Crew in 2022

Personal information
- Full name: Marlon Hairston
- Date of birth: March 23, 1994 (age 32)
- Place of birth: Jackson, Mississippi, United States
- Height: 6 ft 0 in (1.83 m)
- Positions: Midfielder; full-back

College career
Years	Team	Apps	(Gls)
2012–2013	Louisville Cardinals	39	(6)

Senior career*
Years	Team	Apps	(Gls)
2014–2018	Colorado Rapids	107	(7)
2015	→ Charlotte Independence (loan)	7	(1)
2019	Houston Dynamo	12	(0)
2020	Minnesota United FC	9	(1)
2021–2022	Columbus Crew	24	(0)
2024–2025	Hartford Athletic	44	(3)

International career^{‡}
2014	United States U23	6	(0)
- * Club domestic league appearances and goals as of October 26, 2025 ‡ National team caps and goals as of October 13, 2014

Marlon Hairston (born March 23, 1994) is an American professional soccer player who plays as a midfielder and full-back.

== Career ==
=== College ===
Hairston grew up in Jackson before moving on to a college career at the University of Louisville. Hairston played in 39 games, scored six goals, and had five assists for Louisville Cardinals men's soccer during 2012 and 2013. He was named to the All-Big East Rookie team in 2012 and helped the Cardinals win the American Athletic Conference regular season championship in 2013, when he was named First Team All-AAC.

=== Colorado Rapids ===
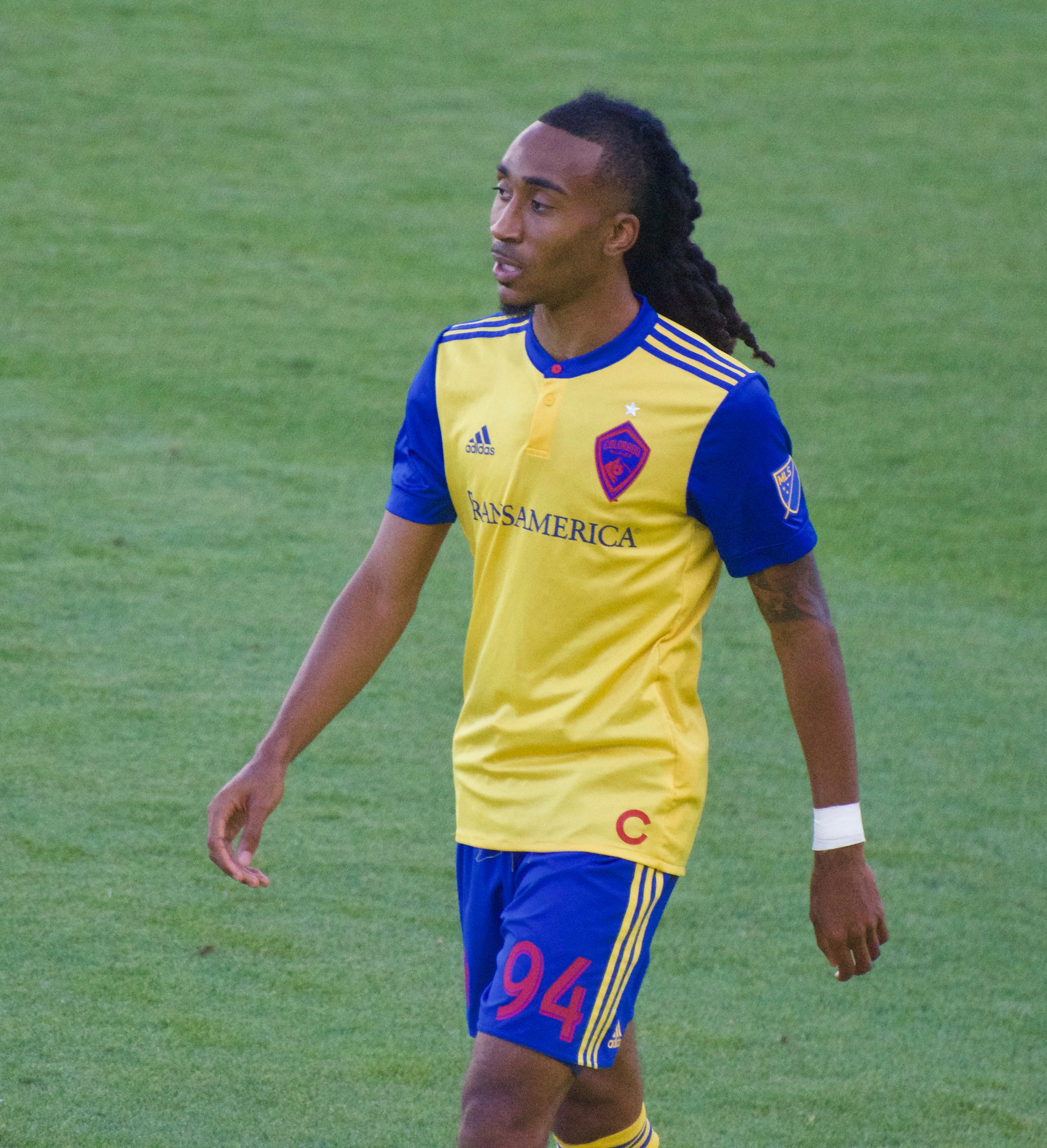
Hairston with the Colorado Rapids in 2017.

After his sophomore year with Louisville, Hairston signed a Generation Adidas contract and was selected 12th overall in the 2014 MLS SuperDraft by the Colorado Rapids.

Hairston made his professional debut on March 29, 2014, against Sporting Kansas City, coming off the bench in a 3–2 loss. He scored his first professional goal on August 20 in a 4–3 loss against the LA Galaxy. Hairston ended his rookie season with 1 goal 22 regular season appearances, nine of them being starts. It was a poor season for Colorado as a team, finishing 8th in the Western Conference and missing out on the playoffs.

On April 2, 2015, Hairston was loaned to USL side Charlotte Independence. On May 12, Hairston earned USL Player of the Week after scoring a goal and picking up an assist in a 3–0 win over the Richmond Kickers. Towards the end of the season, Hairston was called up to the Rapids and started the last three games of the year, all at right back, a change from 2014, when he played in the midfield.

In 2016, Hairston only played in two of the first eleven games for Colorado. On July 16, he came on as a substitute against Sporting Kansas City and scored to give the Rapids a 1–0 win. In his next four games he scored two goals and had two assists. He was rewarded for his strong performances by being named to the MLS Team of the Week for Week 22. He ended the regular season with three goals and six assists from 21 appearances, helping the Rapids qualify for the 2016 MLS Cup Playoffs by finishing 2nd in the Western Conference. In the playoffs, Hairston made four appearances as the Rapids reached the Conference Finals, where they lost to Seattle Sounders FC, the eventual champions, 3–1 on aggregate.

On March 18, 2017, Hairston scored his first goal of the season in a 2–2 draw with Minnesota United FC. On July 1, he scored twice in a 3–1 Colorado win over the Houston Dynamo. Hairston ended the regular season with 34 appearances, three goals and four assists, tying his career high for goals despite playing a good number of games at right back. He was also the only Rapid to play in every league game in 2017. However, despite a solid season from Hairston, Colorado struggled on the pitch and missed the playoffs. Hairston was regarded for his strong performances by being called up to his first senior US National Team camp.

On February 20, 2018, Hairston made his first appearance in a CONCACAF Champions League match, playing the whole 90 at right wingback in a 2–0 loss to Toronto FC. Hairston suffered a knee injury on March 31 in a win over the Philadelphia Union that required surgery and forced him to miss two months. He returned to action on June 6 in a 2–0 loss to Nashville SC in the US Open Cup. Hairston ended the regular season with 15 appearances and two assists as the Rapids finished 11th in the Western conference, failing to qualify for the playoffs.

=== Houston Dynamo ===
On January 12, 2019, Hairston was traded to the Houston Dynamo in exchange for $125,000 in General Allocation Money for the 2019 season and $50,000 in General Allocation Money for the 2020 season. Hairston made his Dynamo debut February 19, coming on as a substitute for Alberth Elis in a 1–0 win over CD Guastatoya in the CONCACAF Champions League. He would get the start in the next game, helping the Dynamo defeat Guastatoya 2–1 to advance to the quarterfinals. Hairston made his first MLS appearance for Houston on March 2, coming on as a sub in a 1–1 draw with Real Salt Lake. After appearing in nine of the first ten games, Hairston missed three weeks with a hip injury. On June 18, he picked up his first assist for the Dynamo when he won the ball and found Tomás Martínez, who calmly put the ball into the net to give Houston a 2–0 lead over Minnesota United FC. However, the Loons came back in the second half to beat the Dynamo. With little end product, Hairston saw his minutes decrease as the season went on. On August 13, head coach Wilmer Cabrera was fired due to poor results and Davy Arnaud took the reins as the interim coach. The change in coaches was bad news for Hairston. He never saw the pitch in the nine games with Arnaud in control, as the new coach preferred to play midseason acquisitions Christian Ramirez and Niko Hansen over Hairston, although his minutes had declined even before Arnaud took over. He ended the season with twelve appearances, five of them starts, no goals and no assists in regular season play as Houston finished 10th in the Western Conference and missed out on the playoffs.

=== Minnesota United ===
On November 13, 2019, Hairston was traded along with $600,000 in Allocation Money to Minnesota United FC in exchange for Darwin Quintero and the 3rd-round pick in the 2020 MLS SuperDraft. He made his Minnesota debut on July 22, coming on as a substitute in a 2–2 draw with the Colorado Rapids during the group stage of the MLS is Back Tournament. On August 1, he scored his first goal for the Loons in a 4–1 win over Orlando City SC in the MLS is Back quarterfinals. He made his first start for Minnesota on September 2 in a 3–0 loss to the Houston Dynamo. Hairston made 9 appearances in a shortened regular season due to the COVID-19 pandemic, helping the Loons finish 4th in the Western Conference and qualify for the playoffs. In the first round, Hairston started in a 3–0 win over Colorado. In the Conference Semifinals, Hairston came off the bench to help the Loons to a 3–0 win over Sporting Kansas City. He did not appear in Minnesota's Conference Final match, a 3–2 loss to Seattle Sounders FC.

On December 11, 2020, he was released by the club following the 2020 season.

=== Columbus Crew ===
On March 3, 2021, Hairston joined the Columbus Crew as a free agent. Originally signed to back up incumbent starter Harrison Afful at right back, Hairston was thrust into the midfield after injuries to key players.

=== Hartford Athletic ===
Hairston joined USL Championship club Hartford Athletic on January 18, 2024.

== International career ==
Hairston was called into a US camp for the first time in April 2013, when he was summoned by Tab Ramos to participate in an under-20 training camp. A month later, he was named to the US roster for the 2013 Toulon Tournament, but did not play. On January 8, 2018, Hairston received a call-up for the United States men's national soccer team for a friendly against Bosnia and Herzegovina. However, Hairston did not receive a cap.

== Personal life ==
Hairston's older brother Marcus played college soccer at the University of Cincinnati and Florida International University, but had his career cut short due to an ACL injury. Hairston's cousin is 7-time NBA all-star LaMarcus Aldridge.

== Career statistics ==
As of March 23, 2021

Club	Season	League			Playoffs		Cup		Continental		Other		Total	
Club	Season	Division	Apps	Goals	Apps	Goals	Apps	Goals	Apps	Goals	Apps	Goals	Apps	Goals
Colorado Rapids	2014	MLS	22	1	—		0	0	—		—		22	1
Colorado Rapids	2015	MLS	3	0	—		2	0	—		—		5	0
Colorado Rapids	2016	MLS	21	3	4	0	1	0	—		—		26	3
Colorado Rapids	2017	MLS	34	3	—		1	0	—		—		35	3
Colorado Rapids	2018	MLS	15	0	—		1	0	2 (Note: Appearances in CONCACAF Champions League)	0	—		18	0
Colorado Rapids	Total		95	7	4	0	5	0	2	0	0	0	106	7
Charlotte Independence (loan)	2015	USL	8	1	—		0	0	—		—		8	1
Houston Dynamo	2019	MLS	12	0	—		2	0	4 (Note: Three appearances in CONCACAF Champions League, one appearance in Leagues Cup)	0	—		18	0
Minnesota United FC	2020	MLS	9	0	2	0	—		—		2	1	13	1
Columbus Crew	2021	MLS	5	0	0	0	0	0	0	0	0	0	0	0
Career total			129	8	6	0	7	0	6	0	2	1	150	9

== Honors ==
Columbus Crew

- Campeones Cup: 2021
