= Ricardo Pérez (Mexican footballer) =

Mexican footballer (born 1995)

Personal information
- Date of birth: May 30, 1995 (age 31)
- Place of birth: Ciudad Juárez, Mexico
- Height: 5 ft 8 in (1.73 m)
- Position: Midfielder

Youth career
- 2008–2013: Colorado Rapids

College career
| Years | Team | Apps | (Gls) |
| 2013–2016 | Creighton Bluejays | 88 | (15) |

Senior career*
| Years | Team | Apps | (Gls) |
| 2014 | Albuquerque Sol | 11 | (1) |
| 2015 | Ocala Stampede | 3 | (0) |
| 2017–2018 | Colorado Rapids | 0 | (0) |
| 2017 | → Colorado Springs Switchbacks (loan) | 6 | (1) |
| 2018 | → Charlotte Independence (loan) | 14 | (0) |
| 2019 | Lansing Ignite | 2 | (0) |
- * Club domestic league appearances and goals as of 15 October 2019

Ricardo Pérez (born May 30, 1995) is a Mexican footballer.

== Career ==
=== College ===
Pérez played four years of college soccer at Creighton University between 2013 and 2016. While at college, Pérez played for USL PDL sides Albuquerque Sol and Ocala Stampede.

=== Club ===
Pérez signed a homegrown player deal with Colorado Rapids on January 6, 2017.

On May 3, 2017, he joined United Soccer League side Colorado Springs Switchbacks on loan.

In March 2018, Pérez moved on loan to Colorado's USL affiliate side Charlotte Independence.

2019 saw Péerz loaned out again, this time to USL League One side Lansing Ignite.
