= Dominique Badji =

Senegalese footballer (born 1992)

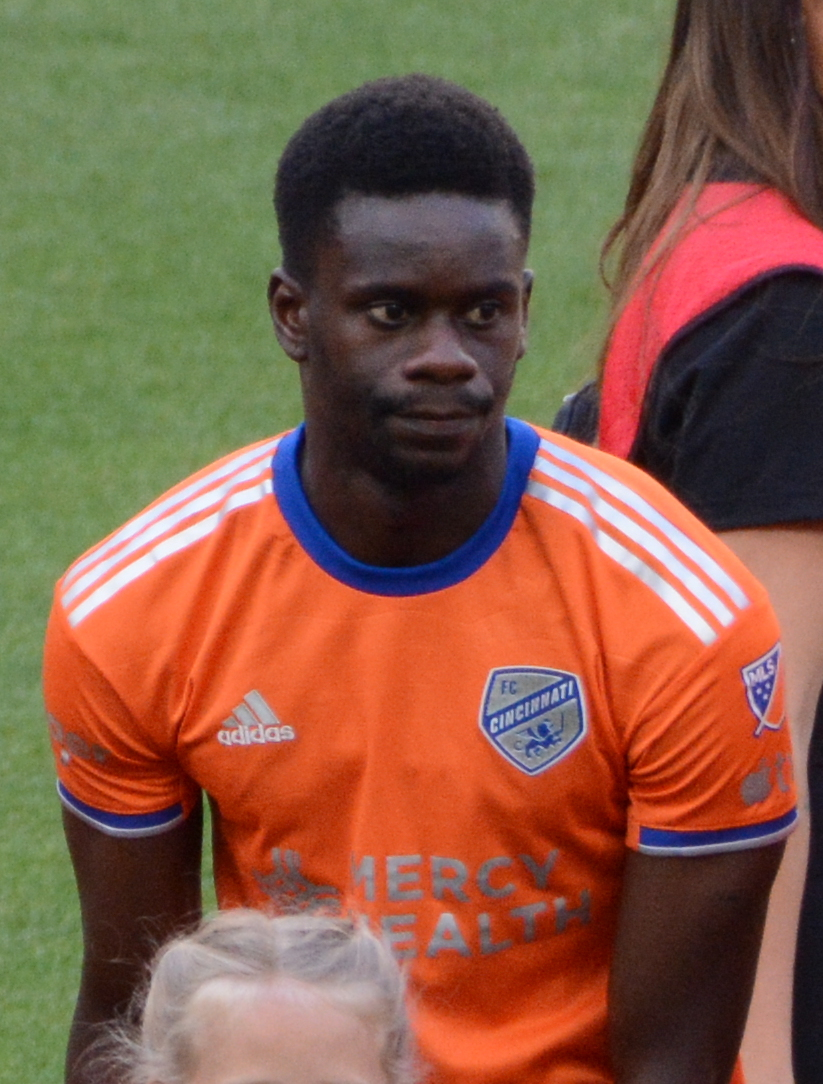
- Badji with FC Cincinnati in 2023

Personal information
- Full name: Dominique Joël Badji
- Date of birth: 16 October 1992 (age 34)
- Place of birth: Dakar, Senegal
- Height: 6 ft 0 in (1.83 m)
- Position: Forward

Team information
- Current team: Phoenix Rising
- Number: 23

College career
Years	Team	Apps	(Gls)
2011–2014	Boston University Terriers	69	(26)

Senior career*
Years	Team	Apps	(Gls)
2014	Real Boston Rams	6	(4)
2015–2018	Colorado Rapids	91	(24)
2015	→ Charlotte Independence (loan)	6	(3)
2018–2020	FC Dallas	38	(8)
2020–2021	Nashville SC	17	(1)
2021	Colorado Rapids	12	(5)
2022–2023	FC Cincinnati	47	(5)
2024	Bandırmaspor	7	(1)
2024–2025	D.C. United	30	(2)
2026–	Phoenix Rising	18	(3)
- * Club domestic league appearances and goals as of 20:09, 10 November 2026 (UTC)

Dominique Joël Badji (born October 16, 1992) is a Senegalese professional footballer who plays as a forward for USL Championship club Phoenix Rising.

== Career ==
=== Early life ===
Born in Dakar, Senegal, Badji moved to Tanzania and Zimbabwe prior to moving to the United States to help further his education. He is the firstborn son of Daniel, an interpreter, liaison and teacher, and Clotilde, a homemaker. Badji spent two years at Episcopal High School, a prestigious boarding school in Alexandria, Virginia on a full scholarship before eventually attending Boston University where he played soccer for the Boston University Terriers. While with the Terriers, Badji was included on the 2014 All Region First Team and was the 2014 Patriot League Offensive Player of the Year. Badji was one of the most athletic collegiate players in the MLS Combine in 2015 in Ft. Lauderdale. With a time of 3.98 secs in the 30-meter dash, 4.10 secs in the 5–10–5 agility and a vertical leap of 36 inches, Badji was the only athlete to score in the top 10 of each category.

=== Colorado Rapids ===
On 15 January 2015, Badji was selected by the Colorado Rapids as the 67th overall selection during the 2015 MLS SuperDraft. After impressing the coaching staff during pre-season, Badji was signed to a professional contract on March 4. Badji scored his first professional goal on April 10 against FC Dallas, ending a 600 minute goalless drought for the club, dating back to 2014. Badji's performance earned him a spot on the MLS Team of the Week alongside teammate Dillon Powers

=== FC Dallas ===
On 23 July 2018, Badji was traded to FC Dallas for Kellyn Acosta. Badji made his debut for the club in August 2018 against Seattle Sounders FC and scored. Dallas went on to lose that game 2–1. Badji was subbed on and started games for the club more frequently. He achieved a total of ten appearances for the club in the 2018 season.

=== Nashville SC ===
On 2 December 2019, Nashville SC acquired Badji from FC Dallas in exchange for $175,000 in Targeted Allocation Money and $150,000 in General Allocation Money.

=== Return to Colorado Rapids ===
On 29 July 2021, Badji returned to Colorado Rapids, traded in exchange for up to $100,000 in General Allocation Money.

=== FC Cincinnati ===
On 4 January 2022, Badji signed a one-year deal with FC Cincinnati as a free agent.

== Career statistics ==
As of 10 May 2025

Club	Season	League			Cup (Note: Includes U.S. Open Cup)		League Cup (Note: Includes MLS Cup Playoffs)		Continental		Total	
Club	Season	Division	Apps	Goals	Apps	Goals	Apps	Goals	Apps	Goals	Apps	Goals
Colorado Rapids	2015	Major League Soccer	15	2	2	2	—		—		17	4
Colorado Rapids	2016	Major League Soccer	27	6	2	1	4	0	—		33	7
Colorado Rapids	2017	Major League Soccer	33	9	2	1	—		—		35	10
Colorado Rapids	2018	Major League Soccer	16	7	—	—	0	0	2 (Note: Appearance(s) in CONCACAF Champions Cup)	0	18	7
Colorado Rapids	Total		91	24	6	4	4	0	2	0	103	28
Charlotte Independence (loan)	2015	United Soccer League	6	2	—		—		—		6	2
FC Dallas	2018	Major League Soccer	10	2	0	0	0	0	0	0	10	2
FC Dallas	2019	Major League Soccer	28	6	0	0	0	0	0	0	28	6
FC Dallas	Total		38	8	0	0	0	0	0	0	38	8
Nashville SC	2020	Major League Soccer	12	1	0	0	0	0	0	0	12	1
Nashville SC	2021	Major League Soccer	5	0	0	0	0	0	0	0	5	0
Nashville SC	Total		17	1	0	0	0	0	0	0	17	1
Colorado Rapids	2021	Major League Soccer	12	5	—		0	0	—		12	5
FC Cincinnati	2022	Major League Soccer	24	0	0	0	1	0	0	0	25	0
FC Cincinnati	2023	Major League Soccer	23	5	4	0	4	0	0	0	31	5
FC Cincinnati	Total		47	5	4	0	5	0	0	0	56	5
Bandırmaspor	2023–24	TFF First League	7	1	1 (Note: Appearance in Turkish Cup)	0	0	0	—		8	1
D.C. United	2024	Major League Soccer	9	1	—		0	0	2 (Note: Appearance(s) in Leagues Cup)	0	11	1
D.C. United	2025	Major League Soccer	10	0	—		0	0	—		10	0
D.C. United	Total		19	1	0	0	0	0	2	0	21	1
Career Total			237	47	11	4	9	0	4	0	261	51

== Honours ==
FC Cincinnati

- Supporters' Shield: 2023
