= Caleb Calvert =

American soccer player (born 1996)

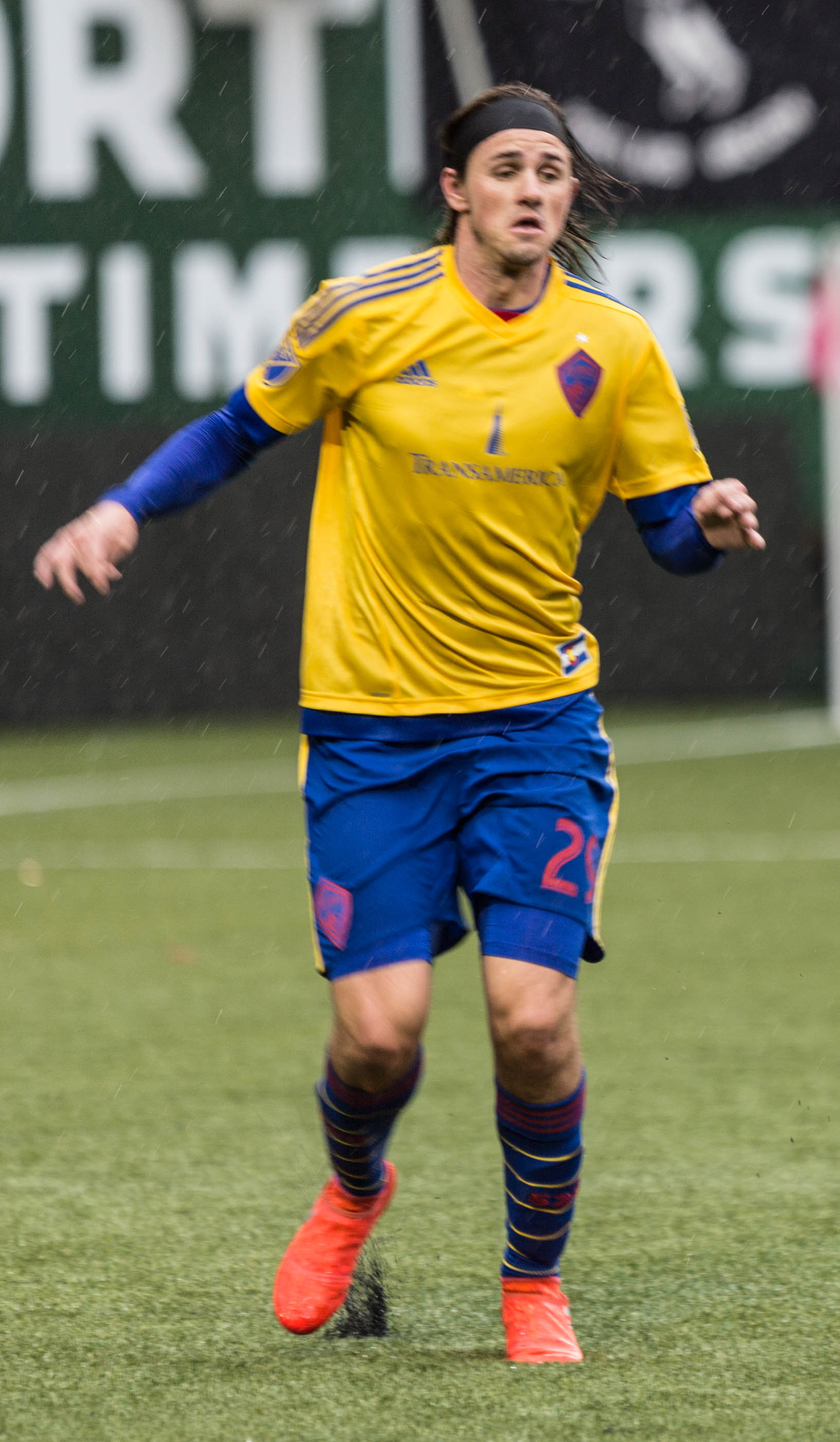
- Calvert with Colorado Rapids in 2016

Personal information
- Date of birth: October 22, 1996 (age 30)
- Place of birth: Wrightwood, California, United States
- Height: 1.88 m (6 ft 2 in)
- Position: Forward

Youth career
- 2011–2013: Chivas USA

Senior career*
Years	Team	Apps	(Gls)
2013–2014	Chivas USA	0	(0)
2015–2018	Colorado Rapids	21	(1)
2015–2016	→ Charlotte Independence (loan)	41	(8)
2017	→ Charlotte Independence (loan)	6	(1)
2018	→ Charlotte Independence (loan)	18	(1)
2019	Saint Louis FC	28	(2)
- * Club domestic league appearances and goals as of October 24, 2019

Caleb Calvert (born October 22, 1996) is an American soccer player who most recently played for Saint Louis FC in the USL Championship.

== Early life and education ==
Caleb attended Serrano High School in Phelan, California. He had originally committed to playing NCAA Division I collegiate soccer for the University of California, Santa Barbara men's soccer team alongside his Chivas USA Academy teammate Ben Spencer before electing to turn professional.

== Career ==
=== Professional ===
On July 5, 2013, Calvert signed a homegrown player contract with Chivas USA, making him the youngest signing in club history. However, he never got a chance to play for the club as Chivas folded after the 2014 season.

On November 19, 2014, Calvert was selected by the Colorado Rapids in the 2014 MLS Dispersal Draft. On March 27, 2015, it was announced that Calvert had been sent on loan to USL affiliate club Charlotte Independence. He made his professional debut that same day in a 3–2 defeat to the Charleston Battery.
