= Shkëlzen Gashi =

Albanian footballer (born 1988)

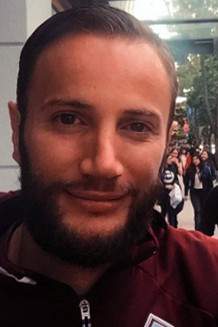
- Gashi in 2016

Personal information
- Full name: Shkëlzen Taib Gashi
- Date of birth: 15 July 1988 (age 38)
- Place of birth: Zürich, Switzerland
- Height: 1.82 m (6 ft 0 in)
- Positions: Midfielder; forward

Youth career
- 1998–2007: Zürich
- 1999–2000: → Grasshoppers (loan)

Senior career*
Years	Team	Apps	(Gls)
2005–2009	Zürich	1	(0)
2005–2007	Zürich U21	47	(12)
2008	→ Schaffhausen (loan)	16	(3)
2008–2009	→ Bellinzona (loan)	30	(3)
2010–2011	Neuchâtel Xamax	13	(1)
2011	→ Aarau (loan)	15	(5)
2012	Aarau	26	(17)
2012–2014	Grasshoppers	60	(24)
2014–2016	Basel	41	(25)
2016–2019	Colorado Rapids	68	(14)
2020–2023	Aarau	55	(20)
Total		372	(124)

International career
2004–2005	Switzerland U17	12	(1)
2005–2006	Switzerland U19	5	(2)
2006–2009	Switzerland U21	10	(5)
2013–2016	Albania	17	(1)
- * Club domestic league appearances and goals

Shkëlzen Taib Gashi (born 15 July 1988) is a retired professional footballer who played as a midfielder and forward. He is best known for his time with Grasshopper Club Zürich and FC Basel. With Grasshopper he won the 2012–13 Swiss Cup and he was Swiss champion in the 2014–15 season with Basel. Born in Switzerland, he represented the Albania national team.

== Club career ==
=== Early career and Zürich ===
Gashi was born in Zürich, Switzerland to parents originally from Qabiq of Klina, Kosovo. A product of Zürich academy, Gashi made his professional debut at the age of 18 on 12 August 2006 in the 2006–07 Swiss Super League match against St. Gallen, playing in the last 13 minutes of the 3–1 loss. He also made his European debut later on 6 December of the following year, appearing as a substitute in an UEFA Cup group stage match against Spartak Moscow which finished in a 1–0 away loss.

==== Loan at Schaffhausen ====
On 29 January 2008, in the winter transfer window, Gashi was sent on loan to Swiss Challenge League side Schaffhausen until the end of 2007–08 season. Gashi made 16 league appearances until the end of the season, scoring three times in the process. After the end of the season, Gashi returned to Zürich in July 2008 only to be sent again on loan to Bellinzona for one-and-a-half season.

==== Loan at Bellinzona ====
Gashi made his Bellinzona debut on 23 July 2008 in the Swiss Super League match against Neuchâtel Xamax, playing for 65 minutes in a 1–2 home defeat. He scored his first European goal on 28 August in the second leg of UEFA Cup second qualifying round against Dnipro Dnipropetrovsk, leading the team to a 2–1 home win and progression to the next round thanks to away goal rule. The first match finished in a 3–2 away defeat.

He scored his first league goal of the season on 5 October during the 3–3 away draw against the same opponent, which was followed by another strike in team's 2–3 home defeat to Basel. He finished his first season with Granata having made 24 appearances in all competitions, including 17 in league and 5 in UEFA Cup, scoring three goals in the process.

Gashi started his second Bellinzona season on 12 July 2009 by playing in the opening league match against Neuchâtel Xamax, finished in a 1–1 draw. He scored his first goal of the season against his parent club Zürich on 4 October, giving his team a 3–2 home win. That was his final league goal for the club, as he left in January 2010.

=== Neuchâtel Xamax ===
In January 2010, Gashi joined fellow Swiss Super League side Neuchâtel Xamax, signing a two-year contract. He made his debut for the club on 6 February by appearing as a substitute in the goalless draw against Zürich. Later on 21 February, Gashi made his first league start by playing for 85 minutes in team's 1–1 draw at Sion. He scored his first and goal of the season with Neuchâtel Xamax again against Zürich, in a match that ended in a 3–3 home draw.

In the first part of the 2010–11, Gashi remained on the bench for 12 matches, making only one appearance as a substitute on 28 August in the 4–1 away defeat to Basel.

=== Aarau ===
In January 2011, Gashi was loaned out to Aarau for a year. During the second part of 2010–11 Gashi made 15 league appearances for the new team, scoring 5 goals in the process. He made his league debut for them on 20 February 2011, a debut which brought his first goal as well, in a 5–3 home win against Biel-Bienne. When Neuchâtel Xamax lost its license, in January 2012 he signed a contract with Aarau for the remainder of the season.

With Aarau in the full 2011–12 season of Swiss Challenge League he made it 26 appearances, 25 as a starter and just once as a substitute, in where he scored 17 goals to help his team ranking as runners-up behind St. Gallen and finishing himself in the second place of the Top Scorers rank among two other players with the same number of 17 goals, Moreno Merenda (Vaduz) and Igor Tadić (Kriens), also and behind of his compatriot, the fellow Albania national team's striker, Armando Sadiku who won the Golden boot with 19 goals playing for Locarno.

=== Grasshopper ===
When his contract at Aarau expired in June 2012, he signed a three-year deal with Grasshopper Club Zürich on 24 May. He was allocated squad number 10, and made his competitive debut on 15 July in the opening league match of 2012–13 season against Sion, finished in a 0–2 home defeat. Gashi netted his first goal of the season against the same opponent on 24 November, giving his team a 1–1 draw. During his first season with Grasshopper, Gashi played 28 league matches, including 17 as a starter, and scored 5 goals, helping the team to finish the season as runner-up.

Gashi debuted with a goal in the 2013–14 season, as he scored the opening goal in the 67th minute against St. Gallen on 14 July 2013, with the match finishing in a 0–2 victory. He netted his second of the season on 27 July against his former team Aarau, contributing in a 4–2 home win. Gashi played full-90 minutes in both legs of UEFA Champions League third qualifying round against Lyon, who eliminated Grasshopper by winning both matches 1–0.

Following Grasshopper's exclusion from Champions League, they were dropped to UEFA Europa League where the team played the first match against Fiorentina at home, with Gashi who played for 57 minutes in an eventual 1–2 loss. Gashi continued his goalscoring form at the start of the season by scoring a penalty goal against Lausanne on 20 October, which was followed by another goal against Köniz in Swiss Cup.

On 16 March 2014, Gashi scored his first hat-trick in the match against Sion finished in the victory 4–2. He continued with his solid performances by netting another goal in the 2–0 win at Lausanne which ranked him first in the top goalscorers list among with his teammate Caio. On 4 May 2014 Gashi scored four goals in the 5–0 win against Young Boys. He opened the score in the 4th minute and then between 13 minutes starting from the 41st minute he scored 3 other goals. Three days after, Gashi scored a penalty goal against St. Gallen; the match finished in a clean result 2–0.

Gashi finished the 2013–14 season with a total of 32 appearances and 19 league goals scored, leading the goalscoring table with a difference 6 goals from the closest followers, Caio his teammate, Mario Gavranović and Valentin Stocker, each with 13 goals. His performances throughout the season attracted the interest of several clubs, including Lazio, Torino and Borussia Mönchengladbach.

=== Basel ===
On 28 June 2014, the UEFA Champions League hopefuls FC Basel 1893 reached an agreement with domestic rivals Grasshopper to sign Gashi on a four-year contract in the next coming days subject to passing a medical. He was presented on 1 July and Basel discovered to have paid an estimated €3 million for Gashi and he would earn until of €1 million per season including benefits. He joined the team for their 2014–15 season under head coach Paulo Sousa.

==== 2014–15 season ====
Gashi made his competitive debut for the team on 19 July 2014 in the match against Aarau, starting and providing the goal of Naser Aliji in an eventual 2–1 away win. He scored his first goal of the season eight days later against Luzern, scoring his team's second goal in a 3–0 home win. After this, Gashi continued with his superb form, scoring in the 3–2 away win against Thun and the 4–1 home win against Zürich, taking his tally up to three goals.

He continued with his solid performances in league, supplying two assists in the 3–1 home win against Young Boys, which was followed by the lone goal scored against the same opponent on 18 October. After not playing the first three Champions League group stage matches, Gashi debuted and scored his first Champions League during the 4–0 home win over Ludogorets Razgrad, becoming the fourth Albanian player after Kliton Bozgo, Besart Berisha and Lorik Cana to score a goal in this competitions.

Gashi scored his first brace of the season on 23 November in the matchday 16 against Aarau, which finished in a 3–0 win. This was followed by another brace one week later in the 1–2 away win to Zürich; the second goal was a last-minute winner. In the final Champions League group stage match against Liverpool, Gashi played as a left winger in an eventual 1–1 draw; he was praised for his performance during the match, which led the official website of UEFA.com to introduce Gashi in the "Team of the Week". In the description for the Albanian player, the UEFA website said that Gashi ran about 12 km, making it the biggest threat to "Reds" doing 2 solo-actions (one blocked and one outside the gate) were the best argument for the 26-year-old qualities.

In December 2014, Gashi was voted as the best player of the year in the Swiss Super League. At the end of the first half of the season, Gashi was included in the best eleven of the Swiss Super League. In February 2015, Gashi was proclaimed as the "Best Player of the Year 2014" in the Swiss Award, which was held by the Swiss Football Association at their gala for the past year. This because Gashi was 2013–14 top scorer with 19 goals, for the Grasshoppers and after his transfer to Basel during the summer, the striker closed the year again as top scorer for his new club. All assessments were made through votes from coaches, captains and journalists, as the Swiss Football Association finally brought the winners.

Gashi scored the second part of the season by scoring in Basel's 4–2 defeat of Grasshopper on 8 February. This was followed by another goal in the 1–1 draw against Sion, taking his tally up to 13 league goals. He became 1 of the 3 Albania international footballers which participated in a knockout stage of the UEFA Champions League for the first time in history, among his teammates at Basel Taulant Xhaka and Arlind Ajeti. Gashi continued with his excellent form, scoring a brace against Thun on 7 March, which was followed by two other braces in the wins against Lurzen and Aarau on 21 March and 4 April.

Gashi finished his first season at Basel by making 38 appearances in all competitions, scoring 25 goals in the process. By scoring 22 league goals, Gashi won top-scorer golden boot for the second time in a row and this with two different clubs. Basel won the league for the sixth time in a row, and went to the cup final for the third consecutive season, losing 0–3 to Sion.

==== 2015–16 season ====
In their 2015–16 season Gashi was again a regular starter. On 25 July, in the team's second domestic league match Gashi scored his first goal of the season. It was the first goal of the away match in the Letzigrund as Basel won 3–2 against Grasshopper Club. In the third round of the 2015–16 Swiss Cup away against local amateur club SV Muttenz on 28 October Gashi scored a hat-trick as Basel won 5–1 to proceed to the next round.

During the season's winter break, on 1 February 2016, Basel announced that Gashi was leaving the club and had signed a four-year contract with Colorado Rapids. In the 18 months with team, Gashi played a total of 71 games for Basel scoring a total of 35 goals. 41 of these games were in the Swiss Super League, six in the Swiss Cup, ten in the UEFA competitions (Champions League and Europa League) and 14 were friendly games. He scored 25 goals in the domestic league, six in the cup, one in the European games and the other three were scored during the test games.

=== Colorado Rapids ===
On 1 February 2016 Gashi signed with Major League Soccer club Colorado Rapids as a Designated Player. He experienced what was considered a good first season with the Rapids, scoring 10 league goals as he led the team to a 2nd-place finish in the Western Conference, and a long playoff run. On 24 September 2016, he scored a stunning free-kick in the 75th minute into the top-left corner of the net in a 3–3 draw away to Vancouver Whitecaps. The strike was later voted the 2016 MLS Goal of the Year. In the playoffs, he scored another stunning long-range goal, this time against the LA Galaxy, taking a shot from well outside the penalty box, and beating the keeper in a 1–0 win, which levelled the score on aggregate, and allowed the Rapids to subsequently win on penalties. It was considered a masterful performance by Gashi as they advanced to the Western Conference Championship game. Gashi scored his first goals of the 2017 season on 14 May 2017 against San Jose Earthquakes in a 3–0 victory. He scored the first and last goals in the 29th and 56th minutes. On 28 May 2017 Gashi provided an assist for the Kortne Ford goal which gave Colorado Rapids the 1–0 victory over Sporting Kansas City. Gashi was waived by Colorado on 1 March 2019.

=== Return to Aarau ===
On 2 January 2020, Gashi joined Swiss Challenge League side Aarau, on a three-year contract.

On 25 May 2023, he announced his retirement from football.

== International career ==
=== Switzerland youth level teams ===
Gashi was part and capped for the Switzerland U-17, U-19 and U-21 teams in competitive youth UEFA European Championships respective age categories.

=== Albania ===
In 2013 Gashi declared that he will represent Albania in the international level.

In August 2013 he joined the Albania national team after receiving his first call up by coach Gianni De Biasi for the friendly match against Armenia on 14 August 2013. On 14 August 2013 Gashi received Albanian citizenship and to be able to play for Albania in international level he had to receive the go ahead from FIFA since he had previously played for Swiss national youth teams. In the same day he made his debut against Armenia, coming on as a substitute in the 56th minute for Edmond Kapllani in a 2–0 win. Permission from FIFA was granted on 9 October 2013.

==== Debut & FIFA World Cup 2014 qualifiers ====
His first competitive international match was against the country of his birth Switzerland on 11 October 2013, in a match which he was included in the starting line up and got substituted off in the 55th minute for Odise Roshi, as the match finished in a 1–2 home loss.

He was called up and played a full 90-minutes in a friendly match against Belarus on 15 November 2013, finished in the goalless draw.

==== UEFA Euro 2016 qualifying ====
After 3 first matches of the UEFA Euro 2016 qualifying as an unused substitute, Gashi managed to play for the first time in the tournament on 29 March 2015 against Armenia by coming on as a substitute at half-time in place of Amir Abrashi. On the 81st minute, few minutes after entering the pitch, Gashi scored for the first time in the national team the second goal of Albania in the match, which gave Albania a comeback 2–1 victory: Albania was losing until the 77th minute 0–1 until Mavraj had scored the equalizer. He also contributed in the last match of the qualifiers against Armenia (match ended 0-3 for Albania), where in the first goal he pushed the ball into the net. Despite this, the goal was awarded as an own goal by Kamo Hovhannisyan.

==== Euro 2016 ====
On 21 May 2016, Gashi was named in Albania's preliminary 27-man squad for UEFA Euro 2016, and in Albania's final 23-man UEFA Euro 2016 squad on 31 May.

Gashi played as a 62nd-minute substitute for Armando Sadiku against Switzerland and he had a 1-on-1 challenge versus keeper but his shot was stopped. Then he was an unused substitute in 2 next matches against hosts France where they lost 2–0 and against Romania in an Albania's historical 1–0 win with a goal scored by Armando Sadiku. Albania finished the group in the third position with three points and with a goal difference −2, and was ranked last in the third-placed teams, which eventually eliminated them.

== Personal life ==
Following Albania's historic participation at UEFA Euro 2016, Gashi was among the members of the national team who were issued diplomatic passports by the Albanian government in recognition of their achievement.

== Career statistics ==
=== Club ===
As of match played 28 October 2018

Appearances and goals by club, season and competition
Club	Season	League			Cup		Continental		Other		Total	
Club	Season	Division	Apps	Goals	Apps	Goals	Apps	Goals	Apps	Goals	Apps	Goals
FC Zürich U21	2005–06	1. Liga Promotion	21	4	—		—		—		21	4
FC Zürich U21	2006–07	1. Liga Promotion	18	4	—		—		—		18	4
FC Zürich U21	2007–08	1. Liga Promotion	8	4	—		—		—		8	4
FC Zürich U21	Total		47	12	—		—		—		47	12
FC Zürich	2006–07	Swiss Super League	1	0	—		—		—		1	0
FC Zürich	2007–08	Swiss Super League	0	0	—		2 (Note: Appearance(s) in UEFA Cup)	0	—		2	0
FC Zürich	Total		1	0	—		2	0	—		3	0
Schaffhausen	2007–08	Swiss Challenge League	16	3	—		—		—		16	3
Bellinzona	2008–09	Swiss Super League	17	2	2	0	5	1	—		24	3
Bellinzona	2009–10	Swiss Super League	13	1	2	1	—		—		15	2
Bellinzona	Total		30	3	4	1	5	1	—		39	5
Neuchâtel Xamax	2009–10	Swiss Super League	12	1	—		—		—		12	1
Neuchâtel Xamax	2010–11	Swiss Super League	1	0	1	1	—		—		2	1
Neuchâtel Xamax	Total		13	1	1	1	—		—		14	2
FC Aarau	2010–11	Swiss Challenge League	15	5	—		—		—		15	5
FC Aarau	2011–12	Swiss Challenge League	26	17	1	0	—		2	1	29	18
FC Aarau	Total		41	22	1	0	—		2	1	44	23
Grasshoppers	2012–13	Swiss Super League	28	5	5	1	—		—		33	6
Grasshoppers	2013–14	Swiss Super League	32	19	3	1	4 (Note: Two appearances in UEFA Champions League, two appearances in UEFA Europa League)	0	—		39	20
Grasshoppers	Total		60	24	8	2	4	0	—		72	26
Grasshoppers U21	2012–13	1. Liga Classic	1	0	—		—		—		1	0
Basel	2014–15	Swiss Super League	31	22	3	3	5 (Note: Appearance(s) in UEFA Champions League)	1	—		39	26
Basel	2015–16	Swiss Super League	10	3	3	3	5 (Note: Three appearances in UEFA Champions League, two appearances in UEFA Europa League)	0	—		18	6
Basel	Total		41	25	6	6	10	1	—		57	32
Colorado Rapids	2016	Major League Soccer	30	10	—		—		4	1	34	11
Colorado Rapids	2017	Major League Soccer	17	2	1	0	—		—		18	2
Colorado Rapids	2018	Major League Soccer	21	2	—		—		—		21	2
Colorado Rapids	Total		68	14	1	0	—		4	1	73	15
FC Aarau	2019–20	Swiss Challenge League	0	0	0	0	—		—		0	0
FC Aarau	Total		0	0	0	0	—		—		0	0
Career total			318	104	21	10	21	2	6	2	366	118

=== International ===
As of match played 6 September 2016

Appearances and goals by national team and year
National team	Year	Apps	Goals
Albania	2013	3	0
Albania	2014	2	0
Albania	2015	6	1
Albania	2016	6	0
Total		17	1

As of 29 March 2015
Scores and results list Albania goal tally first, score column indicates score after each Gashi goal.

List of international goals scored by Shkëlzen Gashi
No.	Date	Venue	Cap	Opponent	Score	Result	Competition
1	29 March 2015	Elbasan Arena, Elbasan, Albania	6	Armenia	2–1	2–1	UEFA Euro 2016 qualifying

== Honours ==
Zürich

- Swiss Super League: 2006–07

Grasshopper

- Swiss Cup: 2012–13

Basel

- Swiss Super League: 2014–15
- Swiss Cup: runner up 2014–15

Individual

- Axpo Super League Footballer of the Year: 2014
- Footballer of the year : Colorado Rapids Major League Soccer 2016
- MLS Goal of the Year Award: 2016
- Swiss Super League Golden Boot: 2013–14 (19 goals), 2014–15 (22 goals)
