= All-time Colorado Rapids roster =

This list comprises all players who have participated in at least one league match for Colorado Rapids since the team's first Major League Soccer season in 1996. Players who were on the roster but never played a first team game are not listed; players who appeared for the team in other competitions (US Open Cup, CONCACAF Champions League, etc.) but never actually made an MLS appearance are noted at the bottom of the page.

A "†" denotes players who only appeared in a single match.

== A ==
- (Ghana) Bismark Adjei-Boateng
- (Ghana) Junior Agogo
- (Germany) Stefan Aigner
- (United States) Andre Akpan
- (United States) Carlos Alvarez
- (United States) Quincy Amarikwa
- (Colombia) Rafael Amaya
- (United States) Kevin Anderson
- (United States) Davy Armstrong
- (Canada) Geoff Aunger †
- (Uganda) Micheal Azira

== B ==
- (United States) Imad Baba
- (Senegal) Dominique Badji
- (United States) Marcelo Balboa
- (Morocco) Mehdi Ballouchy
- (South Africa) Shaun Bartlett
- (United States) Brian Bates
- (France) Julien Baudet
- (United States) Kyle Beckerman
- (Israel) Dedi Ben Dayan
- (United States) Scott Benedetti
- (Canada) Jason Bent
- (United States) John Berner
- (United States) Alex Blake
- (Sweden) Johan Blomberg
- (Ivory Coast) Yannick Boli
- (United States) Nat Borchers
- (United States) Jason Boyce
- (United States) Paul Bravo
- (United States) Adin Brown
- (Jamaica) Deshorn Brown
- (Panama) Roberto Brown
- (United States) Edson Buddle
- (United States) Marc Burch
- (United States) José Burciaga, Jr.
- (United States) Bobby Burling
- (United States) Preston Burpo
- (England) Ian Butterworth

== C ==
- (Ecuador) Diego Calderón
- (United States) Caleb Calvert
- (Uruguay) José Cancela
- (Canada) Adrian Cann
- (United States) Joe Cannon
- (United States) Scott Cannon
- (United States) Chris Carrieri
- (United States) Tony Cascio
- (United States) Conor Casey
- (Mexico) Jorge Castañeda
- (United States) David Castellanos
- (Costa Rica) Dennis Castillo
- (United States) Edgar Castillo
- (Colombia) Jaime Castrillón
- (Haiti) Steward Ceus
- (Honduras) Marvin Chávez
- (United States) Mark Chung
- (United States) Jordan Cila
- (United States) Colin Clark
- (United States) Nico Colaluca
- (New Zealand) Kip Colvey
- (Guadeloupe) Miguel Comminges
- (England) Terry Cooke
- (Senegal) Bouna Coundoul
- (United States) Matt Crawford
- (United States) Sam Cronin
- (United States) Leo Cullen
- (Jamaica) Omar Cummings
- (United States) Jeff Cunningham

== D ==
- (United States) Mike da Fonte
- (United States) Greg Dalby
- (Jamaica) Chris Dawes
- (Mexico) Antonio de la Torre
- (Cuba) Alberto Delgado
- (Netherlands) Raimo de Vries
- (Panama) Jorge Dely Valdés
- (United States) Eric Denton
- (United States) Danny DeVall
- (El Salvador) Raúl Díaz Arce
- (United States) Joey DiGiamarino
- (United States) Jeff DiMaria
- (United States) John DiRaimondo
- (Argentina) Facundo Diz
- (England) Paul Dougherty
- (United States) Conor Doyle
- (Republic of Ireland) Kevin Doyle

== E ==
- (Republic of Ireland) Danny Earls
- (Brazil) Edu
- (United States) Troy Edwards
- (Cameroon) Charles Eloundou
- (Argentina) Facundo Erpen

== F ==
- (United States) Ian Feuer
- (Honduras) Maynor Figueroa
- (Republic of Ireland) Caleb Folan
- (United States) Kortne Ford
- (United States) Byron Foss
- (United States) Robin Fraser
- (United States) Hunter Freeman

== G ==
- (United States) Dan Gargan
- (United States) Scott Garlick
- (Albania) Shkëlzen Gashi
- (United States) Josh Gatt
- (United States) Cory Gibbs
- (Zimbabwe) Neathan Gibson
- (United States) Luis Gil
- (Trinidad and Tobago) Cornell Glen
- (Brazil) Rafael Gomes †
- (Argentina) Christian Gómez
- (United States) Herculez Gomez
- (United States) Luchi Gonzalez
- (United States) Alan Gordon
- (Belarus) Sasha Gotsmanov †
- (United States) Paul Grafer
- (United States) Kelly Gray
- (United States) Joseph Greenspan
- (Jamaica) Brenton Griffiths †
- (United States) Rivers Guthrie †

== H ==
- (United States) Marcus Hahnemann
- (United States) Marlon Hairston
- (United States) Sam Hamilton
- (Costa Rica) Denis Hamlett
- (United States) Jean Harbor
- (Chile) Kevin Harbottle
- (United States) Ty Harden
- (United States) Michael Harrington
- (Saint Kitts and Nevis) Atiba Harris
- (Jamaica) Wolde Harris
- (United States) Wes Hart
- (United States) Jordan Harvey
- (Colombia) Hárrison Henao †
- (United States) Chris Henderson
- (United States) Sean Henderson
- (United States) Stephen Herdsman
- (Argentina) Nicolás Hernández
- (United States) Kamani Hill
- (United States) Michael Holody
- (United States) Tim Howard
- (United States) Dusty Hudock

== I ==
- (United States) Ugo Ihemelu
- (United States) Clint Irwin

== J ==
- (England) Danny Jackson †
- (United States) Niki Jackson
- (United States) Tahj Jakins
- (United States) Guillermo Jara
- (United States) Jermaine Jones
- (Spain) José Mari
- (United States) Ian Joyce

== K ==
- (Senegal) Macoumba Kandji
- (Spain) Aitor Karanka
- (United States) Stephen Keel
- (United States) Lance Key
- (Japan) Kosuke Kimura
- (United States) Zach Kingsley
- (United States) Dominic Kinnear
- (United States) Jovan Kirovski
- (United States) Chris Klute
- (United States) Matt Kmosko
- (England) Zat Knight
- (United States) Ritchie Kotschau
- (United States) David Kramer

== L ==
- (United States) Ross LaBauex
- (United States) Nick LaBrocca
- (United States) Jeff Larentowicz
- (France) Sébastien Le Toux
- (United States) Ricky Lewis
- (Sweden) Anders Limpar
- (Argentina) Claudio López
- (United States) Amir Lowery

== M ==
- (United States) Zac MacMath
- (Brazil) Marquinho
- (Jamaica) Tyrone Marshall
- (United States) Tim Martin
- (United States) Chris Martinez
- (Uruguay) Enzo Martínez
- (Cuba) Rey Ángel Martínez
- (Brazil) Thiago Martins
- (England) Joe Mason
- (United States) Pablo Mastroeni
- (United States) Clint Mathis
- (United States) Jack McBean
- (United States) Josh McKay
- (United States) Matt McKeon
- (Scotland) Tam McManus
- (Israel) Guy Melamed
- (Colombia) Germán Mera
- (United States) Eric Miller
- (United States) Drew Moor
- (United States) Jason Moore
- (United States) Martín Morales †
- (United States) Brian Mullan
- (Democratic Republic of the Congo) Danny Mwanga

== N ==
- (Cameroon) Joseph Nane
- (United States) Joe Nasco
- (United States) John Neeskens
- (United States) Ben Newnam †
- (Cameroon) Alain N'Kong
- (Haiti) Fabrice Noël
- (United States) Pat Noonan
- (United States) Andre Nunley †
- (The Gambia) Sanna Nyassi

== O ==
- (United States) Ciaran O'Brien
- (United States) Matt Okoh
- (United States) Shane O'Neill
- (Mexico) Daniel Osorno

== P ==
- (Chile) Raúl Palacios
- (United States) Scott Palguta
- (Guatemala) Marco Pappa
- (Mexico) David Patiño
- (United States) Ross Paule
- (United States) Russell Payne
- (Uruguay) Adrián Paz
- (United States) Jacob Peterson
- (United States) Mike Petke
- (Haiti) Peguero Jean Philippe
- (United States) Matt Pickens
- (Austria) Thomas Piermayr
- (Argentina) Lucas Pittinari
- (United States) Ed Pinon
- (Jamaica) Darryl Powell
- (United States) Dillon Powers
- (England) Jack Price
- (United States) Brandon Prideaux

== Q ==
- (El Salvador) Marvin Quijano

== R ==
- (Argentina) Juan Ramírez
- (United States) Steve Rammel
- (Guyana) Gregory Richardson †
- (United States) James Riley
- (Argentina) Martín Rivero
- (Mexico) Alberto Rizo
- (Liberia) Zizi Roberts
- (United States) Felipe Rodriguez

== S ==
- (Sweden) Mohammed Saeid
- (Peru) Waldir Sáenz
- (Uruguay) Vicente Sánchez
- (United States) Tony Sanneh
- (Brazil) Marcelo Sarvas
- (United States) Darren Sawatzky
- (United States) Casey Schmidt
- (United States) Ross Schunk
- (Colombia) Diego Serna
- (United States) Dillon Serna
- (United States) Steve Shak
- (Liberia) Musa Shannon
- (England) Richard Sharpe
- (Sweden) Axel Sjöberg
- (Scotland) Jamie Smith
- (New Zealand) Tommy Smith
- (Argentina) Luis Solignac
- (Scotland) John Spencer
- (Uganda) Eugene Sseppuya †
- (Republic of Ireland) Sean St Ledger
- (United States) Jeff Stewart
- (United States) Nathan Sturgis
- (United States) Gary Sullivan

== T ==
- (Liberia) Melvin Tarley
- (Honduras) Hendry Thomas
- (Trinidad and Tobago) Keyeno Thomas
- (United States) Wells Thompson
- (United States) Zach Thornton †
- (Trinidad and Tobago) Rick Titus
- (Panama) Gabriel Torres
- (United States) Seth Trembly
- (United States) Steve Trittschuh

== V ==
- (Colombia) Carlos Valderrama
- (United States) Scott Vallow
- (United States) Grant Van De Casteele †
- (United States) Greg Vanney
- (United States) David Vaudreuil
- (United States) Peter Vermes
- (United States) Scott Vermillion
- (Netherlands) Raimo de Vries

== W ==
- (United States) Tyson Wahl
- (United States) Craig Waibel
- (United States) Anthony Wallace
- (United States) Daniel Wasson
- (United States) Jared Watts
- (United States) Roy Wegerle
- (United States) Marquis White
- (Trinidad and Tobago) Mekeil Williams
- (Scotland) Danny Wilson
- (United States) Chris Wingert
- (United States) Alan Woods †
- (England) Chris Woods
- (New Zealand) Deklan Wynne
- (United States) Marvell Wynne

== Z ==
- (United States) Cesar Zambrano †
- (Colombia) Luis Zapata

== Sources ==
- "MLS All-Time MLS Player Register". Mlsnet.com. Major League Soccer. Archived from the original on 14 February 2009.
- "MLS Number Assignments Archive".
