= 2012 Colorado Rapids season =

Colorado Rapids
2012 season
- Owner: Stan Kroenke
- Coach: Óscar Pareja
- Major League Soccer: TBD
- MLS Cup: Did not qualify
- U.S. Open Cup: Third round
- Rocky Mountain Cup: Lost
- Hawaiian Islands Invitational: Third place
- Highest home attendance: 19,152 v Los Angeles Galaxy (April 21, 2012)
- Lowest home attendance: 10,969 v C.D. Chivas USA (April 28, 2012)
- Average home league attendance: 15,175
Home colors	Away colors

The 2012 Colorado Rapids season was the team's eighteenth year of existence. The team's first match was on March 10 at Dick's Sporting Goods Park.

== Competitions ==
=== Hawaiian Islands Invitational ===
February 23, 2012	Yokohama	2–1	Colorado Rapids	Honolulu, HI
22:30 MST	Namba 57', 64'	Report	Moor 73'	Stadium: Aloha Stadium; Attendance: 7,388; Referee: Jair Marrufo

February 25, 2012	Melbourne Heart	0–1	Colorado Rapids	Honolulu, HI
20:00 MST	Lagana (yellow card) 63'; Groenewald (yellow card) 72'; Paterson (yellow card) 89'	Report	Cascio 30'	Stadium: Aloha Stadium; Attendance: 10,073; Referee: Ricardo Salazar

=== Major League Soccer ===
==== Results summary ====
Overall								Home						Away					
Pld	W	D	L	GF	GA	GD	Pts	W	D	L	GF	GA	GD	W	D	L	GF	GA	GD
34	11	4	19	44	50	−6	37	8	3	6	29	19	+10	3	1	13	15	31	−16

Last updated: 2 June 2013.
Source: Major League Soccer

==== Results by round ====
Round	1	2	3	4	5	6	7	8	9	10	11	12	13	14	15	16	17	18	19	20	21	22	23	24	25	26	27	28	29	30	31	32	33	34
Stadium	H	A	A	H	A	A	H	H	A	A	A	H	H	A	H	H	H	A	H	A	A	H	H	A	H	A	A	H	A	A	H	H	A	H
Result	W	W	L	W	L	L	L	W	L	W	L	D	W	L	L	W	L	L	L	L	L	L	W	L	D	L	L	W	L	D	D	L	W	W

Source: Colorado Rapids
A = Away; H = Home; W = Win; D = Draw; L = Loss

==== Match results ====
March 10 Match 1	Colorado Rapids	2–0	Columbus Crew	Commerce City
17:00 MDT	Moor 44'; Wynne (yellow card) 80'; Amarikwa 89'	Report	Mirosevic (yellow card) 40'; Vargas (yellow card) 72'; Rentería (yellow card) 80'	Stadium: Dick's Sporting Goods Park; Attendance: 14,746; Referee: Hilario Grajeda

March 18 Match 2	Philadelphia Union	1–2	Colorado Rapids	Chester, PA
14:00 MDT	Gómez (yellow card) 31'; Farfan (yellow card) 52'; Pajoy 67'; Torres (yellow card) 91'	Report	Larentowicz (yellow card) 44'; Castrillon 56'; Larentowicz (red card) 58'; Cascio 62'; Castrillon (yellow card) 74'	Stadium: PPL Park; Attendance: 19,074; Referee: Mark Geiger

March 25 Match 3	New York Red Bulls	4–1	Colorado Rapids	Harrison, NJ
14:00 MDT	Henry 3'; Cooper 6'; Soli (yellow card) 31'; Henry 44'; Marquez (yellow card) 60'; Cooper 89'	Report	Cummings 77'	Stadium: Red Bull Arena; Attendance: 21,024; Referee: Hilario Grajeda

April 1 Match 4	Colorado Rapids	2–0	Chicago Fire	Commerce City
17:00 MDT	Cummings 58'; Hill 92+'	Report	Grazzini (yellow card) 55'	Stadium: Dick's Sporting Goods Park; Attendance: 13,152; Referee: Chris Penso

April 7 Match 5	Real Salt Lake	2–0	Colorado Rapids	Sandy, UT
19:00 MDT	Sabório 20'; Espínola 57'; Olave (yellow card) 74'; Beckerman (yellow card) 74'; Gil (yellow card) 81'	Report	Pickens (yellow card) 58'; Moor (yellow card) 81'	Stadium: Rio Tinto Stadium; Attendance: 16,870; Referee: Jair Marrufo

April 14 Match 6	Seattle Sounders FC	1–0	Colorado Rapids	Seattle, WA
14:00 MDT	Johnson (yellow card) 47'; Scott (yellow card) 49' (goal) 63'; Montero (yellow card) 87'	Match Report	Mullan (yellow card) 87'	Stadium: CenturyLink Field; Attendance: 38,360; Referee: Baldomero Toledo

April 21 Match 7	Colorado Rapids	1–2	Los Angeles Galaxy	Commerce City
19:00 MDT	Wynne 21' (o.g.); Larentowicz (yellow card) 23'; Kimura (yellow card) 43'; Cummings 63'; Cummings (yellow card) 83'	Report	Donovan 39'; Juninho (yellow card) 66'; Lopes (yellow card) 91'	Stadium: Dick's Sporting Goods Park; Attendance: 19,152; Referee: Ramon Hernandez

April 28 Match 8	Colorado Rapids	4–0	Chivas USA	Commerce City
19:00 MDT	Cascio 50' Larentowicz (yellow card) 59'; Freeman (yellow card) 75'; Hill 82'; Larentowicz 84' (pen.) Hill 90+3'	Report		Stadium: Dick's Sporting Goods Park; Attendance: 10,969; Referee: Kevin Stott

May 2 Match 9	New England Revolution	2–1	Colorado Rapids	Foxborough, MA
18:00 MDT	Sene 27' Cárdenas 39'; Feilhaber (yellow card) 65'; Barnes (yellow card) 74' Nguyen (yellow card) 76'	Report	Castrillon 21' Marshall (yellow card) 45' Castrillon (yellow card) 90'	Stadium: Gillette Stadium; Attendance: 6,149; Referee: Terry Vaughn

May 6 Match 10	FC Dallas	0–2	Colorado Rapids	Frisco, TX
17:00 MDT	Hernandez (yellow card) 25' Hernandez (red card) 34' Perez (red card) 36'	Report	Cascio (yellow card) 38' Castrillon (yellow card) 44' (goal) 61' Rivero 74'	Stadium: FC Dallas Stadium; Attendance: 11,702; Referee: Mark Geiger

May 16 Match 11	D.C. United	2–0	Colorado Rapids	Washington, D.C.
17:30 MDT	De Rosario 25'; Salihi (yellow card) 40' (goal) 60'; Najar (yellow card) 75'	Report	Larentowicz (yellow card) 61'; Rivero (yellow card) 86'; Marshall (yellow card) 91'	Stadium: RFK Stadium; Attendance: 11,593; Referee: Matthew Foerster

May 19 Match 12	Colorado Rapids	2 - 2	Sporting Kansas City	Commerce City
19:00 MDT	Marshall 52'; Kimura 60'	Report	Bunbury 2' 14'; Convey (yellow card) 51'	Stadium: Dick's Sporting Goods Park; Attendance: 15,269; Referee: Edvin Jurisevic

May 26 Match 13	Colorado Rapids	3–2	Montreal Impact	Commerce City
19:00 MDT	Larentowicz 18'; Moor 39'; Rivero (yellow card) 41'; Marshall (yellow card) 51' (red card) 61'; Thompson (yellow card) 56'; Castrillon 83'	Report	Bernier 14'; Arnaud (yellow card) 35'; Wenger 48'	Stadium: Dick's Sporting Goods Park; Attendance: 17,877; Referee: Mark Kadlecik

June 16 Match 14	Vancouver Whitecaps FC	1 - 0	Colorado Rapids	Vancouver, BC
17:00 MDT	Rochat (yellow card) 42'; Mattocks (yellow card) 59' (yellow-red card) 60'; Le Toux 80'	Report		Stadium: BC Place; Attendance: 19,166; Referee: (United States) Jasen Anno

June 20 Match 15	Colorado Rapids	1 - 2	San Jose Earthquakes	Commerce City
19:30 MDT	Mullan 18'; Zapata (yellow card) 54'; Moor (yellow card) 90'	Report	Chávez (yellow card) 28'; Beitashour (yellow card) 31'; Bernárdez (yellow card) 45'; Gordon 84'; Wondolowski 90+1' (pen.)	Stadium: Dick's Sporting Goods Park; Attendance: 13,080; Referee: (United States) Sorin Stoica

June 30 Match 16	Colorado Rapids	3 - 0	Portland Timbers	Commerce City
19:00 MDT	Castrillón 18'; Casey 26'; Smith 89'; Larentowicz (yellow card) 90+2'	Report	Chará (yellow card) 73'	Stadium: Dick's Sporting Goods Park; Attendance: 15,553; Referee: (United States) Chris Penso

July 4 Match 17	Colorado Rapids	0 - 1	Vancouver Whitecaps FC	Commerce City
19:30 MDT		Report	Rochat (yellow card) 41'; Mattocks 43' (yellow card) 90+2'	Stadium: Dick's Sporting Goods Park; Attendance: 18,757; Referee: (Canada) Dave Gantar

July 7 Match 18	Seattle Sounders FC	2 - 1	Colorado Rapids	Seattle, WA
21:00 MDT	Fernández 53'; Johnson 64' (yellow card) 65'	Report	Rivero (yellow card) 41'; Cummings 79'	Stadium: CenturyLink Field; Attendance: 39,060; Referee: (United States) Kevin Stott

July 14 Match 19	Colorado Rapids	1 - 2	FC Dallas	Commerce City
19:00 MDT	Cummings 51'	Report	Castillo (yellow card) 57' (goal) 81'; Rodríguez 60'	Stadium: Dick's Sporting Goods Park; Attendance: 13,284; Referee: (United States) Yader Reyes

July 18 Match 20	Toronto FC	2 - 1	Colorado Rapids	Toronto, ON
17:00 MDT	Johnson (yellow card) 17' (goal) 51'; Wiedeman 68'	Report	Casey 23'; Larentowicz (yellow card) 90'	Stadium: BMO Field; Attendance: 18,225; Referee: (United States) Ismail Elfath

July 21 Match 21	Real Salt Lake	2 - 0	Colorado Rapids	Sandy, UT
20:00 MDT	Saborío 32'; Steele (yellow card) 82'; Johnson 89'	Report	Nane (yellow card) 45'	Stadium: Rio Tinto Stadium; Attendance: 19,492; Referee: (Canada) Silviu Petrescu

July 28 Match 22	Colorado Rapids	1 - 2	Seattle Sounders FC	Commerce City
19:00 MDT	Moor 4'	Report	Johnson 1'; Alonso 65'	Stadium: Dick's Sporting Goods Park; Attendance: 13,816; Referee: (Canada) Paul Wood

August 4 Match 23	Colorado Rapids	1 - 0	Real Salt Lake	Commerce City
19:00 MDT	Nane 38'	Report		Stadium: Dick's Sporting Goods Park; Attendance: 15,218; Referee: (United States) Jorge Gonzalez

August 11 Match 24	FC Dallas	3 - 2	Colorado Rapids	Frisco, TX
19:00 MDT	Castillo 41' (yellow card) 89'; Benítez 44'; Ferreira 49' (yellow card) 90+4'; Jacobson (yellow card) 54'	Report	Castrillón 12' (red card) 72'; Freeman (yellow card) 38'; Nane (yellow card) 47'; Moor (yellow card) 52'; Larentowicz 54'	Stadium: FC Dallas Stadium; Attendance: 10,222; Referee: (United States) Armando Villarreal

August 18 Match 25	Colorado Rapids	1 - 1	Chivas USA	Commerce City
19:00 MDT	Mullan 19'	Report	Joseph (yellow card) 78'; Minda (yellow card) 80'; Ángel 83'	Stadium: Dick's Sporting Goods Park; Attendance: 15,679; Referee: Ramon Hernandez

August 25 Match 26	San Jose Earthquakes	4 - 1	Colorado Rapids	Santa Clara, CA
MDT	Dawkins 11'; Gordon 43'; Dawkins 68'; Gordon 75'	Report	Marshall 54'; Casey (yellow card) 55'	Stadium: Buck Shaw Stadium; Attendance: 10,525; Referee: Silviu Petrescu

August 31 Match 27	Portland Timbers	1 - 0	Colorado Rapids	Portland, OR
20:30 MDT	Smith (yellow card) 30'; Dike 45'	Report	Larentowicz (yellow card) 70'; Wahl (yellow card) 87'	Stadium: Jeld-Wen Field; Attendance: 20,438; Referee: Jair Marrufo

September 5 Match 28	Colorado Rapids	3 - 0	Portland Timbers	Commerce City
19:00 MDT	Zapata (yellow card) 14'; Akpan 6'; Cascio 27'; Thomas (yellow card) 46'; Castrillón 86'	Report	Chará (yellow card) 42'; Smith (yellow card) 74'; Jewsbury (yellow card) 83'	Stadium: Dick's Sporting Goods Park; Attendance: 13,086; Referee: Juan Guzman

September 16 Match 29	Los Angeles Galaxy	2 - 0	Colorado Rapids	Carson, CA
17:00 MDT	Keane 15'; Wilhelmsson 58'; DeLaGarza (yellow card) 77'	Report		Stadium: Home Depot Center; Attendance: 20,204; Referee: Ismail Elfath

September 23 Match 30	Vancouver Whitecaps FC	2 - 2	Colorado Rapids	Vancouver, BC
17:30 MDT	Richards (yellow card) 22'; Camilo (yellow card) 29'; Rochat 64'; Miller 68'	Report	Cummings 34'; Smith 86'	Stadium: BC Place; Attendance: 18,992; Referee: Drew Fischer

September 30 Match 31	Colorado Rapids	1 - 1	Los Angeles Galaxy	Commerce City
17:00 MDT	Larentowicz (yellow card) 2'; Castrillón 16'	Report	Sarvas 10'; Magee (yellow card) 17'; Donovan (yellow card) 29'	Stadium: Dick's Sporting Goods Park; Attendance: 17,649; Referee: Allen Chapman

October 6 Match 32	Colorado Rapids	1 - 4	San Jose Earthquakes	Commerce City
19:00 MDT	Freeman (yellow card) 32'; Hill (yellow card) 80'; Akpan 92' (pen.)	Report	Chávez 2'; Wondolowski 11'; Chávez (yellow card) 32'; Wondolowski 51'; Wondolowski 83'; Hernandez (red card) 91'	Stadium: Dick's Sporting Goods Park; Attendance: 15,232; Referee: Jose Carlos Rivero

October 20 Match 33	Chivas USA	0 - 2	Colorado Rapids	Carson, CA
20:30 MDT	Zemanski (yellow card) 78'; Valencia (yellow card) 88'	Report	Wahl (yellow card) 11'; Rivero 16'; Hill 43'	Stadium: Home Depot Center; Attendance: 11,499; Referee: Yader Reyes

October 27 Match 34	Colorado Rapids	2 - 0	Houston Dynamo	Commerce City
19:00 MDT	Hill 9'; Akpan 76'	Report		Stadium: Dick's Sporting Goods Park; Attendance: 15,453; Referee: Hilario Grajeda

==== Table ====
Western Conference

Pos	Team	Pld	W	L	T	GF	GA	GD	Pts	Qualification
1	San Jose Earthquakes	34	19	6	9	72	43	+29	66	Qualification for the conference semifinals
2	Real Salt Lake	34	17	11	6	46	35	+11	57	Qualification for the conference semifinals
3	Seattle Sounders FC	34	15	8	11	51	33	+18	56	Qualification for the conference semifinals
4	LA Galaxy	34	16	12	6	59	47	+12	54	Qualification for the knockout round
5	Vancouver Whitecaps FC	34	11	13	10	35	41	−6	43	Qualification for the knockout round
6	FC Dallas	34	9	13	12	42	47	−5	39	
7	Colorado Rapids	34	11	19	4	44	50	−6	37	
8	Portland Timbers	34	8	16	10	34	56	−22	34	
9	Chivas USA	34	7	18	9	24	58	−34	30	

Source: MLS

Overall

Pos	Team	Pld	W	L	T	GF	GA	GD	Pts	
1	San Jose Earthquakes (S)	34	19	6	9	72	43	+29	66	Qualification for the CONCACAF Champions League
2	Sporting Kansas City (U)	34	18	7	9	42	27	+15	63	Qualification for the CONCACAF Champions League
3	D.C. United	34	17	10	7	53	43	+10	58	
4	New York Red Bulls	34	16	9	9	57	46	+11	57	
5	Real Salt Lake	34	17	11	6	46	35	+11	57	
6	Chicago Fire	34	17	11	6	46	41	+5	57	
7	Seattle Sounders FC	34	15	8	11	51	33	+18	56	
8	LA Galaxy (C)	34	16	12	6	59	47	+12	54	Qualification for the CONCACAF Champions League
9	Houston Dynamo	34	14	9	11	48	41	+7	53	Qualification for the CONCACAF Champions League
10	Columbus Crew	34	15	12	7	44	44	0	52	
11	Vancouver Whitecaps FC	34	11	13	10	35	41	−6	43	
12	Montreal Impact	34	12	16	6	45	51	−6	42	Qualification for the CONCACAF Champions League
13	FC Dallas	34	9	13	12	42	47	−5	39	
14	Colorado Rapids	34	11	19	4	44	50	−6	37	
15	Philadelphia Union	34	10	18	6	37	45	−8	36	
16	New England Revolution	34	9	17	8	39	44	−5	35	
17	Portland Timbers	34	8	16	10	34	56	−22	34	
18	Chivas USA	34	7	18	9	24	58	−34	30	
19	Toronto FC (V)	34	5	21	8	36	62	−26	23	

Source: MLS
Rules for classification: 1) points; 2) head-to-head record; 3) goal difference; 4) number of goals scored
(C) MLS Cup champions; (S) Supporters' Shield winners; (U) U.S. Open Cup winners; (V) Canadian Championship winners

=== U.S. Open Cup ===
May 29, 2012 Third round	Tampa Bay Rowdies	1–3	Colorado Rapids	St. Petersburg, FL
7:30 PM EDT	Antoniuk (yellow card) 19'; Washington (yellow card) 56'; Clare 90+2'	Report	Edu 17' (pen.); Akpan 33'; Thompson (yellow card) 55'; Marshall (yellow card) 57'; Hill 90+1'; Ceus (yellow card) 90+2'	Stadium: Al Lang Stadium

June 5, 2012 Fourth round	Sporting Kansas City	2 - 0	Colorado Rapids	Kansas City, Kansas
20:30	Collin (yellow card) 14'; Pickens 27' (o.g.); Júlio César (yellow card) 33'; Bunbury 79'	Report	Larentowicz (yellow card) 58'; Freeman (yellow card) 85'; LaBauex (yellow card) 88'	Stadium: Livestrong Sporting Park; Attendance: 14,868

== Roster & Transfers ==
=== Roster ===
Roster on October 1, 2012.

No.	Position	Nation	Player
2	DF	USA	Hunter Freeman
3	DF	USA	Drew Moor
4	MF	USA	Jeff Larentowicz
5	MF	CMR	Joseph Nane
6	DF	USA	Anthony Wallace
8	DF	USA	Tyson Wahl
9	FW	USA	Conor Casey
10	MF	ARG	Martín Rivero (on loan from Rosario Central)
11	MF	USA	Brian Mullan
12	MF	HON	Hendry Thomas
13	FW	USA	Kamani Hill
14	FW	JAM	Omar Cummings
15	DF	USA	Chris Klute (on loan from Atlanta Silverbacks)
17	GK	USA	Ian Joyce
18	GK	USA	Matt Pickens
19	FW	USA	Andre Akpan
20	MF	SCO	Jamie Smith
21	DF	COL	Luis Zapata
22	DF	USA	Marvell Wynne
23	MF	COL	Jaime Castrillón
25	MF	USA	Pablo Mastroeni
28	MF	USA	Davy Armstrong (HGP)
29	DF	USA	Scott Palguta
31	GK	HAI	Steward Ceus
32	MF	USA	Tony Cascio
34	DF	JAM	Tyrone Marshall
36	MF	USA	Shane O'Neill (HGP)
37	FW	BRA	Edu

=== In ===
No.	Pos.	Player	Transferred from	Fee/notes	Date	Ref.
2	DF	(United States) Hunter Freeman	(United States) Houston Dynamo	Re-Entry Draft	December 12, 2011	
N/A	MF	(Bosnia and Herzegovina) Baggio Hušidić	(United States) Chicago Fire	Re-Entry Draft	December 12, 2011	
23	MF	(Colombia) Jaime Castrillón	(Colombia) Independiente Medellín	Undisclosed	January 25, 2012	
21	DF	(Colombia) Luis Zapata	Unattached	Free	February 24, 2012	
13	FW	(United States) Kamani Hill	Unattached	Free	March 28, 2012	
37	FW	(Brazil) Edu	Unattached	Free	April 26, 2012	
8	DF	(United States) Tyson Wahl	(Canada) Montreal Impact	Trade	July 13, 2012	
12	MF	(Honduras) Hendry Thomas	(England) Wigan Athletic	Undisclosed	August 21, 2012	

=== MLS Drafts ===
Pos.	Player	Transferred from	Fee/notes	Date	Ref.
MF	(United States) Tony Cascio	(United States) Connecticut Huskies	SuperDraft, 1st round	January 12, 2012	
MF	(Japan) Kohei Yamada	(Japan) Thespa Kusatsu	Supplemental Draft, 3rd round	January 17, 2012	
GK	(United States) Joel Helmick	(United States) Longwood Lancers	Supplemental Draft, 4th round	January 17, 2012	

=== Out ===
No.	Pos.	Player	Transferred to	Fee/notes	Date	Ref.
23	MF	(The Gambia) Sanna Nyassi	(Canada) Montreal Impact	Expansion Draft	November 23, 2011	
N/A	MF	(Bosnia and Herzegovina) Baggio Hušidić	(Sweden) Hammarby	Undisclosed	December 23, 2011	
10	FW	(Senegal) Macoumba Kandji	(United States) Houston Dynamo	Trade	February 8, 2012	
7	MF	(Canada) Josh Janniere	N/A (Waived)	Waived	May 7, 2012	
8	DF	(United States) Eddie Ababio	N/A (Waived)	Waived	June 28, 2012	
12	FW	(United States) Quincy Amarikwa	N/A (Waived)	Waived	June 28, 2012	
16	MF	(United States) Ross LaBauex	N/A (Waived)	Waived	June 28, 2012	
27	DF	(Japan) Kosuke Kimura	(United States) Portland Timbers	Trade	July 5, 2012	
15	MF	(United States) Wells Thompson	(United States) Chicago Fire	Trade	September 10, 2012	

=== Loan in ===
No.	Pos.	Player	Previous club	Start	End	Ref.
10	MF	(Argentina) Martín Rivero	(Argentina) Rosario Central	February 16, 2012	December 31, 2013	
99	MF	(Colombia) Hárrison Henao	(Colombia) Once Caldas	April 11, 2012	July 16, 2012	
15	DF	(United States) Chris Klute	(United States) Atlanta Silverbacks	September 14, 2012	July 2013	

== Miscellany ==
=== Allocation ranking ===
Colorado is in the #14 position in the MLS Allocation Ranking. The allocation ranking is the mechanism used to determine which MLS club has first priority to acquire a U.S. National Team player who signs with MLS after playing abroad, or a former MLS player who returns to the league after having gone to a club abroad for a transfer fee. A ranking can be traded, provided that part of the compensation received in return is another club's ranking.

=== International roster spots ===
Colorado has 7 MLS International Roster Slots for use in the 2012 season. Each club in Major League Soccer is allocated 8 international roster slots. Colorado acquired an additional permanent slot from Real Salt Lake in 2005, traded slots to Vancouver Whitecaps FC in both 2010 and 2012, and traded another slot to New York Red Bulls in 2010. In July 2012, Colorado acquired a slot from Portland Timbers which returns to Portland on 1 January 2013.

=== Future draft pick trades ===
Future picks acquired: * 2013 MLS SuperDraft Round 4 pick from Houston Dynamo; * 2014 MLS SuperDraft conditional pick from Houston Dynamo.
Future picks traded: * 2013 Supplemental Draft Round 3 pick to Vancouver Whitecaps FC; * 2014 MLS SuperDraft Round 2 pick to Vancouver Whitecaps FC.

== See also ==
- 2012 in American soccer
- Colorado Rapids
