= 2016 Fort Lauderdale Strikers season =

Fort Lauderdale Strikers
2016 season
- Owner(s): Paulo Cesso; Rafael Bertan; Ronaldo
- Head coach: Caio Zanardi
- Stadium: Central Broward Stadium; Lauderhill, Florida
- NASL: Spring: Sixth Fall: Sixth Combined: Sixth
- The Championship: did not qualify
- U.S. Open Cup: Quarterfinals
- Top goalscorer: Maicon Santos (5)
- Highest home attendance: 2,129 (Apr. 2 vs. Miami)
- Lowest home attendance: 1,048 (May 14 vs. Indy Eleven)
- Average home league attendance: 1,291
Home colors	Away colors	Third colors

The 2016 Fort Lauderdale Strikers season was the team's sixth season in the North American Soccer League (NASL).

== Players and staff ==
=== Roster ===
As of August 9, 2016

No.	Position	Nation	Player
1	GK	BRA	Bruno Cardoso
2	DF	BRA	Dalton
3	MF	USA	Neil Hlavaty
5	DF	CAN	Nana Attakora
7	FW	BRA	Geison Moura
8	MF	BRA	Kléberson
9	MF	HON	Ramón Núñez
10	MF	BRA	Adrianinho
11	FW	BRA	Paulo Jr.
12	GK	USA	Diego Restrepo
13	DF	CUB	Jorge Luis Corrales
14	DF	TTO	Julius James
15	FW	BRA	Amauri
16	MF	USA	Luis Felipe Fernandes
17	MF	USA	Bryan Arguez
18	MF	HAI	Jean Alexandre
19	FW	COL	José Angulo
20	MF	USA	Christian Blandon
21	DF	COL	Luis Zapata
23	MF	USA	Manny Gonzalez
24	DF	PER	Aurelio Saco Vértiz
27	MF	USA	Victor Pineda
29	FW	BRA	Maicon Santos
44	DF	USA	Gale Agbossoumonde
77	DF	BRA	Gabriel
98	GK	USA	Matias Reynares

=== Technical Staff ===
- (Brazil) Caio Zanardi - Head Coach and General Manager
- (Canada) Phillip Dos Santos - Assistant Coach
- (Brazil) Ricardo Lopes – Goalkeepers Coach
- (Brazil) Cassiano Costa – Strength and Conditioning Coach
- (Brazil) Bruno Costa – Assistant General Manager and Head of Scouting

== Competitions ==
Win Tie Loss

=== Friendlies ===
January 6, 2016 Friendly	Fort Lauderdale Strikers	Cancelled	Boca Raton FC	Fort Lauderdale
4:00 p.m. ET				Stadium: Lockhart Stadium
Note: Cancelled due to rain.

January 10, 2016 Florida Cup	Fort Lauderdale Strikers (United States)	0–2	(Germany) Schalke 04	Orlando
7:30 p.m. ET		Report	Di Santo 37'; Sané 57'	Stadium: ESPN Wide World of Sports Complex

January 17, 2016 Florida Cup	Fort Lauderdale Strikers (United States)	1–2	(Colombia) Independiente Santa Fe	Boca Raton
4:30 p.m. ET	PC 80'	Report	Zapata 3' (pen.); Balanta 33'	Stadium: FAU Stadium

January 23, 2016 Friendly	Fort Lauderdale Strikers (United States)	0–0	(Brazil) Corinthians	Fort Lauderdale
2:00 p.m. ET		Report		Stadium: Lockhart Stadium

January 26, 2016 Friendly	Fort Lauderdale Strikers (United States)	0–1	(Ukraine) Shakhtar Donetsk	Fort Lauderdale
7:00 p.m. ET		Report	Marlos 79'	Stadium: Lockhart Stadium

February 15, 2016 Friendly	Fort Lauderdale Strikers	3–0	Caribbean Americas Soccer Association All-Stars	Fort Lauderdale
7:30 p.m. ET	Carvalho 45'; Alexandre 45'; Santos 49' (pen.)	Report		Stadium: Lockhart Stadium

February 24, 2016 Scrimmage	Orlando City SC	2–0	Fort Lauderdale Strikers	Sanford
4:00 p.m. ET	Barry 55'; Ribeiro 63'	Report		Stadium: Sylvan Lake Park

March 2, 2016 Friendly	Shandong Luneng (China)	4–1	(United States) Fort Lauderdale Strikers	Jinan
1:00 a.m. ET	Aloísio 7' (pen.); Zhang Wenzhao 19'; Cheng Yuan 74'; Huang Pu 84'	Report	Gabriel 70'

March 6, 2016 Friendly	Sichuan Longfor (China)	0–6	(United States) Fort Lauderdale Strikers	Chengdu
2:30 a.m. ET		Report	Carvalho 9'; Santos 28'; Angulo 65', 68'; Alexandre 86'; Gentile 90'

March 8, 2016 Friendly	Chengdu Qbao (China)	0–1	(United States) Fort Lauderdale Strikers	Chengdu
2:30 a.m. ET		Report	Moura 25'

March 13, 2016 Friendly	Beijing Qihang (China)	0–2	(United States) Fort Lauderdale Strikers	Beijing
9:30 p.m. ET		Report	PC 60'; Santos 65'

== Competitions ==
=== NASL Spring season ===
==== Standings ====
Pos	Team	Pld	W	D	L	GF	GA	GD	Pts	Qualification
1	Indy Eleven (S)	10	4	6	0	15	8	+7	18	Playoffs
2	New York Cosmos	10	6	0	4	15	8	+7	18	
3	FC Edmonton	10	5	2	3	9	7	+2	17	
4	Minnesota United	10	5	1	4	16	12	+4	16	
5	Tampa Bay Rowdies	10	4	4	2	11	9	+2	16	
6	Fort Lauderdale Strikers	10	4	3	3	12	12	0	15	
7	Carolina RailHawks	10	4	2	4	11	13	−2	14	
8	Rayo OKC	10	3	3	4	11	12	−1	12	
9	Ottawa Fury	10	2	3	5	9	14	−5	9	
10	Jacksonville Armada	10	1	4	5	5	11	−6	7	
11	Miami FC	10	1	4	5	7	15	−8	7	

Source: NASL
Rules for classification: 1) points; 2) total goal differential; 3) total goals scored; 4) head-to-head record; 5) away goal differential; 6) away goals scored
(S) Spring season champion

==== Results summary ====
Overall								Home						Away					
Pld	W	D	L	GF	GA	GD	Pts	W	D	L	GF	GA	GD	W	D	L	GF	GA	GD
10	4	3	3	12	12	0	15	1	3	1	4	4	0	3	0	2	8	8	0

Last updated: 12 June 2016.
Source: Match reports

==== Results by round ====
Round	1	2	3	4	5	6	7	8	9	10
Stadium	H	A	H	H	A	H	A	A	H	A
Result	D	L	D	L	W	D	W	W	W	L
Position	4	9	10	11	8	8	6	7	4	6

Updated to match(es) played on 12 June 2016. Source: Match reports
A = Away; H = Home; W = Win; D = Draw; L = Loss

==== Matches ====
April 2, 2016 1	Fort Lauderdale Strikers	1–1	Miami	Fort Lauderdale
19:00 ET	James (yellow card) 23'; Felipe (yellow card) 42'; Santos 90+4' (pen.)	Summary	Cvitanich 12' (pen.); Corrales (yellow card) 21' (yellow-red card) 45+1'; Bernstein (yellow card) 50'; Smith (yellow card) 64'; Chavez (yellow card) 90'	Stadium: Lockhart Stadium; Attendance: 2,129; Referee: Jose Rivero

April 16, 2016 2	Minnesota United	3–0	Fort Lauderdale Strikers	Blaine
20:00 ET	Lowe 40'; Ramirez 45+1'; Cruz (yellow card) 48'; Brovsky (yellow card) 66'; Zapata 69' (o.g.)	Summary	Moura (red card) 22'; Felipe (yellow card) 40'	Stadium: National Sports Center; Attendance: 9,050; Referee: Caleb Mendez

April 23, 2016 3	Fort Lauderdale Strikers	1–1	Jacksonville Armada	Fort Lauderdale
19:00 ET	Alexandre (yellow card) 36' (yellow-red card) 55'; Attakora (yellow card) 39'; Santos 74' (yellow card) 90+2'	Summary	Bahner 16'; George (yellow card) 27'; Ryan (yellow card) 81'	Stadium: Lockhart Stadium; Attendance: 1,097; Referee: Baboucarr Jallow

April 30, 2016 4	Fort Lauderdale Strikers	0–1	Tampa Bay Rowdies	Fort Lauderdale
19:00 ET	Attakora (yellow card) 27'; Gonzalez (yellow card) 48'; Agbossoumonde (yellow card) 56'; Zapata (yellow card) 85'	Summary	Mkandawire (yellow card) 37'; Nanchoff (yellow card) 39'; Guerra (yellow card) 47'; King (yellow card) 68'; Heinemann (yellow card) 70'; Collins 77'	Stadium: Lockhart Stadium; Attendance: 1,086; Referee: Younes Marrakchi

May 7, 2016 5	Carolina RailHawks	1–3	Fort Lauderdale Strikers	Cary
19:30 ET	Albadawi (yellow card) 35'; Marcelin (yellow card) 55'; Shriver 67'	Summary	Santos 7'; Attakora 23'; Carvalho 38' (yellow card) 85'; Angulo (yellow card) 45+2'; Restrepo (yellow card) 83'; Gentile (yellow card) 90+6'	Stadium: WakeMed Soccer Park; Attendance: 5,216; Referee: Guido Gonzalez Jr.

May 14, 2016 6	Fort Lauderdale Strikers	0–0	Indy Eleven	Fort Lauderdale
19:00 ET	PC (yellow card) 75'; Santos (yellow card) 83'	Summary	Braun (yellow card) 61'	Stadium: Lockhart Stadium; Attendance: 1,048; Referee: Mark Kadlecik

May 21, 2016 7	Rayo OKC	1–2	Fort Lauderdale Strikers	Yukon
20:00 ET	Velásquez (yellow card) 28'; Michel 62' (yellow card) 80'; Svantesson (yellow card) 68'; Boateng (yellow card) 73'	Summary	Angulo 33'; PC (yellow card) 61'; Núñez 70'; Santos (yellow card) 77'	Stadium: Miller Stadium; Attendance: 3,712; Referee: Daniel Radford

May 27, 2016 8	Ottawa Fury	1–2	Fort Lauderdale Strikers	Ottawa
19:00 ET	Bailey (yellow card) 12'; Steele (yellow card) 66'; Olivera (yellow card) 76'; Haworth 80' (pen.)	Summary	Santos 8'; Núñez (yellow card) 40'; Gonzalez (yellow card) 63'; Gentile 65'; Felipe (yellow card) 67'	Stadium: TD Place Stadium; Attendance: 5,034; Referee: Alain Ruch

June 4, 2016 9	Fort Lauderdale Strikers	2–1	New York Cosmos	Fort Lauderdale
19:00 ET	Felipe (yellow card) 9'; PC (yellow card) 16'; Restrepo (yellow card) 20'; Angulo 35'; Moura 74'; Gonzalez (yellow card) 80'	Summary	Arango (yellow card) 41' (goal) 90+1'; Ockford (yellow card) 52'	Stadium: Lockhart Stadium; Attendance: 1,297; Referee: Nima Saghafi

June 12, 2016 10	Edmonton	2–1	Fort Lauderdale Strikers	Edmonton
16:00 ET	Keegan 18', 31'; Diakité (yellow card) 57'; Ledgerwood (yellow card) 62'; Eckersley (yellow card) 84'; Ameobi (yellow card) 90+2'	Summary	Agbossoumonde (yellow card) 34'; PC 58' (pen.); Restrepo (yellow card) 63'	Stadium: Clarke Stadium; Attendance: 3,130; Referee: Pierre-Luc Lauziere

=== NASL Fall season ===
==== Standings ====
Pos	Team	Pld	W	D	L	GF	GA	GD	Pts	Qualification
1	New York Cosmos (F)	22	14	5	3	44	21	+23	47	Playoffs
2	Indy Eleven	22	11	4	7	36	25	+11	37	
3	FC Edmonton	22	10	6	6	16	14	+2	36	
4	Rayo OKC	22	9	8	5	28	21	+7	35	
5	Miami FC	22	9	6	7	31	27	+4	33	
6	Fort Lauderdale Strikers	22	7	5	10	19	28	−9	26	
7	Carolina RailHawks	22	7	5	10	25	35	−10	26	
8	Minnesota United	22	6	7	9	25	25	0	25	
9	Puerto Rico	22	5	9	8	19	31	−12	24	
10	Tampa Bay Rowdies	22	5	8	9	29	32	−3	23	
11	Jacksonville Armada	22	5	8	9	25	35	−10	23	
12	Ottawa Fury	22	5	7	10	23	26	−3	22	

Source: NASL
Rules for classification: 1) points; 2) total goal differential; 3) total goals scored; 4) head-to-head record; 5) away goal differential; 6) away goals scored
(F) Fall season champion

==== Results summary ====
Overall								Home						Away					
Pld	W	D	L	GF	GA	GD	Pts	W	D	L	GF	GA	GD	W	D	L	GF	GA	GD
22	7	5	10	19	28	−9	26	5	3	3	11	10	+1	2	2	7	8	18	−10

Last updated: 29 October 2016.
Source: Match reports

==== Results by round ====
Round	1	2	3	4	5	6	7	8	9	10	11	12	13	14	15	16	17	18	19	20	21	22
Stadium	H	A	A	H	A	H	A	A	A	H	H	H	H	A	H	A	A	A	H	H	H	A
Result	D	L	L	L	L	W	L	W	D	W	D	D	W	D	L	L	L	L	W	W	L	W
Position	4	10	10	12	12	11	11	11	11	8	7	8	7	8	10	10	11	11	11	7	9	6

Updated to match(es) played on 6 August 2016. Source: Match reports
A = Away; H = Home; W = Win; D = Draw; L = Loss

==== Matches ====
July 2, 2016 1	Fort Lauderdale Strikers	1–1	Miami	Fort Lauderdale
19:00 ET	Moura (yellow card) 29'; Agbossoumonde 53' (yellow card) 59'; James (yellow card) 55'; Restrepo (yellow card) 69'	Report	Cvitanich 18' (pen.); Farfán (yellow card) 33'; Richards (yellow card) 79'	Stadium: Lockhart Stadium; Attendance: 1,431; Referee: Mark Geiger

July 10, 2016 2	Edmonton	1–0	Fort Lauderdale Strikers	Edmonton
16:00 ET	Shome (yellow card) 20'; Diakité (yellow card) 41'; Ledgerwood (yellow card) 44'; Fordyce 71'	Report	Pineda (yellow card) 49'; PC (yellow card) 63'; James (yellow card) 78'	Stadium: Clarke Stadium; Attendance: 2,098; Referee: Yusri Rudolf

July 13, 2016 3	Indy Eleven	3–0	Fort Lauderdale Strikers	Indianapolis
22:35 ET	Zayed 10'; Lacroix 21'; Janicki 26'	Report	Moura (yellow card) 29' (yellow-red card) 41'; Núñez (yellow card) 44'; Agbossoumonde (yellow card) 90'	Stadium: Michael Carroll Stadium; Attendance: 6,132; Referee: Alex Chilowicz

July 16, 2016 4	Fort Lauderdale Strikers	0–1	Carolina RailHawks	Fort Lauderdale
19:00 ET	Núñez (yellow card) 44' (yellow-red card) 90+1'; Corrales (yellow card) 52'; James (yellow card) 73'	Report	Shriver 23'; Fondy (yellow card) 59'	Stadium: Lockhart Stadium; Attendance: 1,082; Referee: Geoff Gamble

July 23, 2016 5	Minnesota United	3–1	Fort Lauderdale Strikers	Blaine
20:00 ET	Lowe (yellow card) 12'; Banks 14'; Ramirez 23'; Jome 70'; Calvano (yellow card) 72'	Summary	Fernandes (yellow card) 43' (yellow card) 75' (yellow-red card); Paulo Jr. 54'	Stadium: National Sports Center; Attendance: 8,379; Referee: Mark Kadlecik

July 30, 2016 6	Fort Lauderdale Strikers	1–0	Jacksonville Armada	Fort Lauderdale
19:00 ET	James (yellow card) 71'; Agbossoumonde (yellow card) 81'; Santos 88'	Report	Scaglia (yellow card) 59'	Stadium: Lockhart Stadium; Attendance: 1,158; Referee: Tyler Ploeger

August 6, 2016 7	Tampa Bay Rowdies	2–1	Fort Lauderdale Strikers	St. Petersburg
19:30 ET	Mkandawire (yellow card) 21'; Savage 50' (yellow card) 55'; Cole 58'	Report	Agbossoumonde (yellow card) 19'; Fernandes (yellow card) 61'; Angulo 71'	Stadium: Al Lang Stadium; Attendance: 4,997; Referee: Ismail Elfath

August 13, 2016 8	Miami	0–2	Fort Lauderdale Strikers	Miami
20:00 ET	Palacios (yellow card) 57'; Steele (yellow card) 59'	Report	Corrales (yellow card) 38'; Paulo Jr. 84'; Amauri 86'	Stadium: FIU Stadium; Attendance: 7,152; Referee: Ted Unkel

August 17, 2016 9	Jacksonville Armada	1–1	Fort Lauderdale Strikers	Jacksonville
18:30 ET	Steinberger 42'; George (yellow card) 67'	Report	Angulo 20'; Adrianinho (yellow card) 26'; Gonzalez (yellow card) 32'; Dalton (yellow card) 61'; Pineda (yellow card) 88'; Fernandes (yellow card) 90'	Stadium: Community First Park; Attendance: 2,472; Referee: Luis Guardia

August 20, 2016 10	Fort Lauderdale Strikers	3–1	Ottawa Fury	Lauderhill
19:00 ET	Amauri 17', 77'; Alves 83' (o.g.)	Report	Haworth 28'; Alves (yellow card) 87'; Bailey (yellow card) 90+2'	Stadium: Central Broward Stadium; Attendance: 2,247; Referee: Marcos de Olivera

August 31, 2016 11	Fort Lauderdale Strikers	0–0	Minnesota United	Lauderhill
19:30 ET	Attakora (yellow card) 15'; Gonzalez (yellow card) 69'	Report	Laing (yellow card) 62'	Stadium: Central Broward Stadium; Attendance: 455; Referee: Nima Saghafi

September 3, 2016 12	Fort Lauderdale Strikers	0–0	New York Cosmos	Lauderhill
19:00 ET	Attakora (yellow card) 67'; Amauri (yellow card) 87'; Dalton (yellow card) 90+2'	Report	Mendes (yellow card) 51'; Guenzatti (yellow card) 67'	Stadium: Central Broward Stadium; Attendance: 1,821; Referee: Rubiel Vazquez

September 10, 2016 13	Fort Lauderdale Strikers	2–1	Indy Eleven	Lauderhill
19:00 ET	Paulo Jr. 19'; Núñez (yellow card) 52'; Santos 67'; Bruno (yellow card) 90+2'	Report	Palmer (yellow card) 15'; Ring (yellow card) 42'; Lacroix (yellow card) 76'; Torrado (yellow card) 84'; Braun 88'	Stadium: Central Broward Regional Park; Attendance: 2,376; Referee: Mathieu Bourdeau

September 18, 2016 14	Rayo OKC	1–1	Fort Lauderdale Strikers	Yukon
20:00 ET	Boateng (yellow card) 22'; Hernandez (yellow card) 40'; Michel 84' (pen.); Yuma (yellow card) 90'	Report	Santos (yellow card) 32', (goal) 61'	Stadium: Miller Stadium; Attendance: 1,812; Referee: Jaime Herrera

September 24, 2016 15	Fort Lauderdale Strikers	1–4	Tampa Bay Rowdies	Lauderhill
19:00 ET	Núñez 4', (yellow card) 87'	Report	Hristov 15', 43', 83', (yellow card) 65'; Heinemann 37'; King (yellow card) 87'	Stadium: Central Broward Stadium; Attendance: 1,509; Referee: Alejandro Mariscal

September 28, 2016 16	Puerto Rico	2–1	Fort Lauderdale Strikers	Bayamón
19:30 ET	Rudy 41'; Cristiano (yellow card) 44'; Marrero (yellow card) 45+1'; Bardic 67'	Report	Amauri 2'; Pineda (yellow card) 40'; Agbossoumonde (yellow card) 90+2'	Stadium: Juan Ramón Loubriel Stadium; Attendance: 1,424; Referee: Rodphin Harris

October 2, 2016 17	New York Cosmos	2–0	Fort Lauderdale Strikers	Hempstead
16:00 ET	Bover 57'; Moffat (yellow card) 73'; Flores 86'; Ayoze (yellow card) 90+3'	Report	Amauri (yellow card) 79'	Stadium: James M. Shuart Stadium; Attendance: 2,707; Referee: Mathieu Bourdeau

October 9, 2016 18	Carolina RailHawks	3–0	Fort Lauderdale Strikers	Cary
13:00 ET	da Luz 25'; Shriver 42'; Watson 82'	Report	Geison Moura (yellow card) 9'; Maicon Santos (yellow card) 43'	Stadium: WakeMed Soccer Park; Attendance: 4,566; Referee: Younes Marrakchi

October 12, 2016 19	Fort Lauderdale Strikers	1–0	Edmonton	Lauderhill
19:30 ET	Moura 11'; Sandoval (yellow card) 45'	Report	Galvao (yellow card) 19'; Fordyce (yellow card) 55'	Stadium: Central Broward Stadium; Attendance: 418; Referee: Marcos de Oliveira

October 15, 2016 20	Fort Lauderdale Strikers	2–0	Puerto Rico	Lauderhill
19:00 ET	Sandoval (yellow card) 71'; Moura 78'; Angulo 85'	Report	Kafari (yellow card) 23'; Cristiano (yellow card) 58'; Rudy (yellow card) 90+2'	Stadium: Central Broward Regional Park; Attendance: 1,065; Referee: Caleb Mendez

October 22, 2016 21	Fort Lauderdale Strikers	0–2	Rayo OKC	Fort Lauderdale
19:00 ET	Pineda (yellow card) 18'; Amauri (yellow card) 36'; Sandoval (yellow card) 53'; Núñez (yellow card) 70'; James (yellow card) 84'	Report	Velasquez (yellow card) 37'; Ibeagha 50'; Pecka 90+4'	Stadium: Lockhart Stadium; Attendance: 1,071; Referee: Luis Guardia

October 29, 2016 22	Ottawa Fury	0–1	Fort Lauderdale Strikers	Ottawa
14:00 ET	Alves (yellow card) 36'	Report	Moura (yellow card) 42'; Pineda (yellow card) 48'; Amauri 66'; Bruno (yellow card) 90+4'	Stadium: TD Place Stadium; Attendance: 4,903; Referee: Mathieu Bourdeau

=== Combined Standings ===
Pos	Team	Pld	W	D	L	GF	GA	GD	Pts	Qualification
1	New York Cosmos (C, X)	32	20	5	7	59	29	+30	65	Championship qualifiers
2	Indy Eleven	32	15	10	7	51	33	+18	55	Championship qualifiers
3	FC Edmonton	32	15	8	9	25	21	+4	53	Championship qualifiers
4	Rayo OKC	32	12	11	9	39	33	+6	47	Championship qualifiers
5	Minnesota United	32	11	8	13	41	37	+4	41	
6	Fort Lauderdale Strikers	32	11	8	13	31	40	−9	41	
7	Miami FC	32	10	10	12	38	42	−4	40	
8	Carolina RailHawks	32	11	7	14	36	48	−12	40	
9	Tampa Bay Rowdies	32	9	12	11	40	41	−1	39	
10	Ottawa Fury	32	7	10	15	32	40	−8	31	
11	Jacksonville Armada	32	6	12	14	30	46	−16	30	
12	Puerto Rico FC	22	5	9	8	19	31	−12	24	

Source: NASL
Rules for classification: 1) points; 2) total goal differential; 3) total goals scored; 4) head-to-head record; 5) away goal differential; 6) away goals scored
(C) Champions; (X) Regular season champion

=== U.S. Open Cup ===
Fort Lauderdale Strikers will compete in the 2016 edition of the Open Cup.

June 1, 2016 Third Round	Fort Lauderdale Strikers (Florida)	1–1 (a.e.t.) (2–0 p)	(Virginia) Richmond Kickers	Pembroke Pines
11:00 EDT	Gonzalez 2'; Felipe (yellow card) 43'; Saco Vértiz (yellow card) 97'; PC (yellow card) 109'	Summary	Imura 29'; Grant (yellow card) 71'; Pittman (yellow card) 106'	Stadium: Broward College South Campus; Attendance: 200; Referee: Caleb Mendez
	Penalties
	PC (penalty scored); Núñez (penalty missed); Santos (penalty missed); Moura (penalty scored)		Imura (penalty missed); Paulini (penalty missed); Yeisley (penalty missed); Nascimento (penalty missed)

June 15, 2016 Fourth Round	D.C. United (Washington, D.C.)	0–0 (a.e.t.) (3–4 p)	(Florida) Fort Lauderdale Strikers	Boyds
19:00 EDT	Kamara (yellow card) 47'; Durkin (yellow card) 63'	Summary		Stadium: Maryland SoccerPlex; Attendance: 1,800; Referee: Matthew Kreitzer
	Penalties
	Büscher (penalty scored); Vincent (penalty scored); Kemp (penalty scored); Acosta (penalty missed); Jeffrey (penalty missed)		PC (penalty scored); Santos (penalty missed); Gabriel (penalty scored); Núñez (penalty scored); Carvalho (penalty scored)

June 29, 2016 Round of 16	Orlando City SC (Florida)	1–2 (a.e.t.)	(Florida) Fort Lauderdale Strikers	Orlando
19:30 EDT	Molino 15' (red card) 67'; Alston (yellow card) 58'; Heath (yellow card) 71'	Summary	Angulo 12'; PC (yellow card) 17' (goal) 120'; Santos (red card) 67'; Restrepo (yellow card) 77'; Moura (yellow card) 104'	Stadium: Camping World Stadium; Attendance: 3,162; Referee: Caleb Mendez

July 20, 2016 Quarterfinals	Chicago Fire (Illinois)	3–0	(Florida) Fort Lauderdale Strikers	Bridgeview
20:30 EDT	Accam 5' (pen.) de Leeuw 35'; Thiam 51'	Summary	Agbossoumonde (yellow card) 30' (yellow card) 70' (yellow-red card); James (yellow card) 47'	Stadium: Toyota Park; Attendance: 3,666; Referee: Fotis Bazakos

== Squad statistics ==
As of match played 6 August 2016

=== Appearances and goals ===
No.	Pos	Nat	Player	Total		NASL Spring Season		NASL Fall Season		U.S. Open Cup	
No.	Pos	Nat	Player	Apps	Goals	Apps	Goals	Apps	Goals	Apps	Goals
1	GK	(Brazil) BRA	Bruno Cardoso	6	0	4	0	2	0	0	0
2	DF	(Brazil) BRA	Dalton	7	0	6	0	0	0	1	0
5	DF	(Canada) CAN	Nana Attakora	11	1	7	1	2+1	0	1	0
7	FW	(Brazil) BRA	Geison Moura	19	0	9	0	6	0	3+1	0
8	MF	(Brazil) BRA	Kléberson	1	0	0	0	0+1	0	0	0
9	MF	(Honduras) HON	Ramón Núñez	18	1	7+1	1	5+1	0	3+1	0
10	MF	(Brazil) BRA	Adrianinho	6	0	2+1	0	0+2	0	1	0
11	FW	(Brazil) BRA	Paulo Jr.	7	1	0	0	4+2	1	0+1	0
12	GK	(United States) USA	Diego Restrepo	15	0	6	0	5	0	4	0
13	DF	(Cuba) CUB	Jorge Luis Corrales	5	0	0	0	4	0	1	0
14	DF	(Trinidad and Tobago) TTO	Julius James	15	0	4+1	0	7	0	3	0
16	MF	(United States) USA	Luis Felipe	20	0	9+1	0	6	0	4	0
17	MF	(United States) USA	Bryan Arguez	6	0	0	0	4+2	0	0	0
18	MF	(Haiti) HAI	Jean Alexandre	14	0	5+1	0	5	0	3	0
19	FW	(Colombia) COL	José Angulo	21	4	9+1	2	3+4	1	4	1
20	MF	(United States) USA	Christian Blandon	1	0	0+1	0	0	0	0	0
21	DF	(Colombia) COL	Luis Zapata	4	0	2+2	0	0	0	0	0
23	MF	(United States) USA	Manny Gonzalez	11	1	5+1	0	2+2	0	1	1
24	DF	(Peru) PER	Aurelio Saco Vértiz	4	0	3	0	0	0	1	0
27	MF	(United States) USA	Victor Pineda	13	0	1+5	0	2+2	0	1+2	0
29	FW	(Brazil) BRA	Maicon Santos	17	5	8+1	4	5	1	2+1	0
44	DF	(United States) USA	Gale Agbossoumonde	20	1	10	0	7	1	3	0
77	DF	(Brazil) BRA	Gabriel	11	0	1+1	0	5+1	0	3	0
Players who left Fort Lauderdale Strikers during the season:
6	DF	(Brazil) BRA	PC	17	2	10	1	3	0	3+1	1
11	FW	(Brazil) BRA	Matheus Carvalho	8	1	2+4	1	0	0	0+2	0
92	FW	(United States) USA	Giuseppe Gentile	12	1	0+8	1	0+1	0	1+2	0

=== Goal scorers ===
Place	Position	Nation	Number	Name	NASL Spring Season	NASL Fall Season	U.S. Open Cup	Total
1	FW	(Brazil)	29	Maicon Santos	4	1	0	5
2	FW	(Colombia)	19	José Angulo	2	1	1	4
3	DF	(Brazil)	6	PC	1	0	1	2
4	DF	(Canada)	5	Nana Attakora	1	0	0	1
4	FW	(Brazil)	7	Geison Moura	1	0	0	1
4	MF	(Honduras)	9	Ramón Núñez	1	0	0	1
4	FW	(Brazil)	11	Matheus Carvalho	1	0	0	1
4	FW	(Brazil)	11	Paulo Jr.	0	1	0	1
4	MF	(United States)	23	Manny Gonzalez	0	0	1	1
4	DF	(United States)	44	Gale Agbossoumonde	0	1	0	1
4	FW	(United States)	92	Giuseppe Gentile	1	0	0	1
TOTALS					12	4	3	19

=== Disciplinary record ===
Number	Nation	Position	Name	NASL Spring Season		NASL Fall Season		U.S. Open Cup		Total	
Number	Nation	Position	Name	Yellow card	Red card	Yellow card	Red card	Yellow card	Red card	Yellow card	Red card
5	(Canada)	DF	Nana Attakora	2	0	0	0	0	0	2	0
6	(Brazil)	DF	PC	3	0	1	0	2	0	6	0
7	(Brazil)	FW	Geison Moura	0	1	3	1	1	0	4	2
9	(Honduras)	MF	Ramón Núñez	1	0	3	1	0	0	4	1
11	(Brazil)	FW	Matheus Carvalho	1	0	0	0	0	0	1	0
12	(United States)	GK	Diego Restrepo	3	0	1	0	1	0	5	0
13	(Cuba)	DF	Jorge Luis Corrales	0	0	1	0	0	0	1	0
14	(Trinidad and Tobago)	DF	Julius James	1	0	4	0	1	0	6	0
16	(United States)	MF	Luis Felipe	4	0	3	1	1	0	8	1
18	(Haiti)	MF	Jean Alexandre	2	1	0	0	0	0	2	1
19	(Colombia)	FW	José Angulo	1	0	0	0	0	0	1	0
21	(Colombia)	DF	Luis Zapata	1	0	0	0	0	0	1	0
23	(United States)	MF	Manny Gonzalez	3	0	0	0	0	0	3	0
24	(Peru)	DF	Aurelio Saco Vértiz	0	0	0	0	1	0	1	0
27	(United States)	MF	Victor Pineda	0	0	1	0	0	0	1	0
29	(Brazil)	FW	Maicon Santos	3	0	0	0	0	1	3	1
44	(United States)	DF	Gale Agbossoumonde	2	0	4	0	2	1	8	1
92	(United States)	FW	Giuseppe Gentile	1	0	0	0	0	0	1	0
			TOTALS	28	2	21	3	9	2	58	7
