= 2017 Copa Verde =

Tournament details
- Country: Brazil
- Dates: 29 January – 16 May
- Teams: 18

Final positions
- Champions: (Mato Grosso) Luverdense (1st title)
- Runners-up: (Pará) Paysandu

Tournament statistics
- Matches played: 34
- Goals scored: 93 (2.74 per match)
- Top goal scorer(s): (Brazil) Careca (5 goals)

The 2017 Copa Verde was the fourth edition of a football competition held in Brazil. Featuring 18 clubs, Acre, Distrito Federal and Mato Grosso do Sul have two spots; Amapá, Amazonas, Espírito Santo, Mato Grosso, Pará, Rondônia, Roraima and Tocantins with one each. The others four berths was set according to CBF ranking.

In the finals, Luverdense defeated Paysandu 4–2 on aggregate to win their first title and a place in the Round of 16 of the 2018 Copa do Brasil.

== Qualified teams ==
Association	Team	Qualification method
(Acre (state)) Acre; 2 berths	Atlético Acreano	2016 Campeonato Acriano champions
(Acre (state)) Acre; 2 berths	Galvez	2016 Campeonato Acriano 3rd place
(Amapá) Amapá; 1 berth	Santos	2016 Campeonato Amapaense champions
(Amazonas (Brazilian state)) Amazonas; 1+1 berths	Fast Clube	2016 Campeonato Amazonense champions
(Amazonas (Brazilian state)) Amazonas; 1+1 berths	Nacional	4th best placed team in the 2017 CBF ranking not already qualified
(Federal District (Brazil)) Distrito Federal; 2 berths	Luziânia	2016 Campeonato Brasiliense champions
(Federal District (Brazil)) Distrito Federal; 2 berths	Ceilândia	2016 Campeonato Brasiliense runners-up
(Espírito Santo) Espírito Santo; 1 berth	Rio Branco	2016 Copa Espírito Santo champions
(Mato Grosso) Mato Grosso; 1+1 berths	Luverdense	2016 Campeonato Mato-Grossense champions
(Mato Grosso) Mato Grosso; 1+1 berths	Cuiabá	1st best placed team in the 2017 CBF ranking not already qualified
(Mato Grosso do Sul) Mato Grosso do Sul; 2 berths	Sete de Dourados	2016 Campeonato Sul-Mato-Grossense champions
(Mato Grosso do Sul) Mato Grosso do Sul; 2 berths	Operário	2016 Campeonato Sul-Mato-Grossense 3rd place
(Pará) Pará; 1+2 berths	Paysandu	2016 Campeonato Paraense champions
(Pará) Pará; 1+2 berths	Remo	2nd best placed team in the 2017 CBF ranking not already qualified
(Pará) Pará; 1+2 berths	Águia de Marabá	3rd best placed team in the 2017 CBF ranking not already qualified
(Rondônia) Rondônia; 1 berth	Rondoniense	2016 Campeonato Rondoniense 2nd round champions
(Roraima) Roraima; 1 berth	São Raimundo	2016 Campeonato Roraimense champions
(Tocantins) Tocantins; 1 berth	Tocantins de Miracema	2016 Campeonato Tocantinense runners-up

== Schedule ==
The schedule of the competition is as follows.

Stage	First leg	Second leg
Preliminary round	29 January 2017	11 and 12 February 2017
Round of 16	4 and 5 March 2017	16, 17 and 19 March 2017
Quarter-finals	29, 30 and 31 March 2017	1, 3, 4 and 5 April 2017
Semi-finals	15 April 2017	18 and 20 April 2017
Finals	4 May 2017	16 May 2017

== Preliminary round ==
Team 1	Agg.	Team 2	1st leg	2nd leg
Galvez (Acre (state))	2–1	(Amazonas (Brazilian state)) Nacional	1–1	1–0
Sete de Dourados (Mato Grosso do Sul)	1–4	(Federal District (Brazil)) Ceilândia	1–1	0–3

== Bracket ==
Round of 16
(Mato Grosso do Sul) Operário	1	0	1
(Federal District (Brazil)) Luziânia	1	1	2
(Rondônia) Rondoniense (a)	0	1	1
(Mato Grosso) Cuiabá	0	1	1
(Federal District (Brazil)) Ceilândia	0	1	1
(Mato Grosso) Luverdense	1	3	4
Tocantins de Miracema	0	2	2
(Espírito Santo) Rio Branco	2	5	7
(Acre (state)) Atlético Acreano	1	0	1
(Pará) Remo	1	4	5
(Amazonas (Brazilian state)) Fast Clube	1	1	2
(Amapá) Santos	0	4	4
(Roraima) São Raimundo	1	0	1
(Pará) Águia de Marabá	0	3	3
(Acre (state)) Galvez	0	0	0
(Pará) Paysandu	0	2	2

Quarter-finals
(Federal District (Brazil)) Luziânia	3	2	5
(Rondônia) Rondoniense (a)	3	2	5
(Mato Grosso) Luverdense	5	2	7
(Espírito Santo) Rio Branco	0	2	2
(Pará) Remo	2	0	2
(Amapá) Santos	1	3	4
(Pará) Águia de Marabá	1	0	1
(Pará) Paysandu	2	1	3

Semi-finals
(Rondônia) Rondoniense	1	1	2
(Mato Grosso) Luverdense	2	3	5
(Amapá) Santos	1	1	2
(Pará) Paysandu	1	3	4

Finals
(Mato Grosso) Luverdense	3	1	4
(Pará) Paysandu	1	1	2

== Finals ==
4 May 2017
19:30 AMT (UTC−4)

Luverdense (Mato Grosso)	3–1	(Pará) Paysandu
Erik 11'; Marcos Aurélio 42'; Dalton 55'	Report	Daniel Sobralense 6'

Arena Pantanal, Cuiabá
Attendance: 1,853
Referee: Sávio Sampaio

16 May 2017
20:00 BRT (UTC−3)

Paysandu (Pará)	1–1	(Mato Grosso) Luverdense
Leandro Carvalho 4'	Report	Rafael Silva 78' (pen.)

Mangueirão, Belém
Attendance: 26,653
Referee: Rodrigo Batista Raposo

Luverdense won 4–2 on aggregate.
