= Luis Zapata =

Luis Zapata may refer to:

- Luis Zapata (writer) (born 1951), a Mexican writer
- Luis Ramírez Zapata (born 1954), a Salvadoran retired association football (soccer)
- Luis Eduardo Zapata (born 1980), a Colombian association football (soccer) player
