= Nunley =

Nunley is a surname. Notable people with the surname include:

- Andre Nunley (born 1974), former American soccer player
- Booker Nunley (born 1990), American hurdler
- Charlene R. Nunley (born 1950), first woman to become president of Montgomery College
- Frank Nunley (born 1945), American football player
- Harold Nunley (1912–2005), English cricketer
- Jeremy Nunley (1971–2018), American football player
- Royce Nunley (born 1976), American singer
- Troy L. Nunley (born 1964), American judge in the United States District Court for the Eastern District of California

== See also ==
- Nunley's, a New York amusement park and a Tennessee furniture store chain
