= 2006 Kansas City Wizards season =

Kansas City Wizards
2006 season
- Head coach: Bob Gansler; Brian Bliss
- Major League Soccer: East: 5th Overall: 11th
- USOC: Fourth Round
- Top goalscorer: League: Scott Sealy (10); All: Scott Sealy (11)
- Average home league attendance: 11,083
Home colors	Away colors

The 2006 Kansas City Wizards season was the 11th in Major League Soccer. Kansas City continued its decline in the Eastern Conference, finishing with 38 points (10W 14L 8D) and once again joining the Columbus Crew in missing out on post-season play. Despite this, attendance at the cavernous Arrowhead Stadium rose back to around 11,000.

Three Wizards, Jimmy Conrad, Eddie Johnson, and Josh Wolff, represented the United States men's national soccer team at the 2006 FIFA World Cup. The U.S. finished among the worst teams in the tournament, but Conrad and Johnson made substitute appearances in the tournament. An additional player, talented defender José Burciaga Jr., stood out as the top player at the club, making MLS Best XI and becoming the team MVP for the season.

On July 19, 2006, Bob Gansler departed his position as head coach; to that point, he was the most successful coach in Wizards history, winning every trophy the club had amassed to that point (one MLS Cup, one U.S. Open Cup, and one Supporters' Shield). Fans were reportedly pleased with the move, with some having called the longtime coach "Bunker Bob."

This season also marked the final under the MLS multi-club ownership of Lamar Hunt and his sports properties, as a major shift occurred. First, Hunt sold the club to OnGoal, LLC in August (Hunt, a titan of U.S. sports including in MLS, died in December). Next, the new ownership actively looked out for land in the Kansas City area to build a new, soccer-specific stadium to house the club, kicking off a five-year, six-season and three-stadium process leading to an eventual rebrand in 2011.

== Squad ==
Note: Flags indicate national team as defined under FIFA eligibility rules; some limited exceptions apply. Players may hold more than one non-FIFA nationality.

No.	Pos.	Nation	Player
1	GK	USA	Bo Oshoniyi
3	DF	USA	Nick Garcia
4	DF	JAM	Shavar Thomas
5	MF	USA	Kerry Zavagnin
6	DF	USA	Jose Burciaga Jr.
7	FW	USA	Eddie Johnson
9	MF	USA	Sasha Victorine
11	MF	NED	Dave van den Bergh
12	DF	USA	Jimmy Conrad
13	FW	USA	Will John
14	MF	USA	Jack Jewsbury
15	FW	USA	Josh Wolff
16	DF	USA	Brian Roberts
17	FW	ARM	Yura Movsisyan

No.	Pos.	Nation	Player
18	GK	USA	Will Hesmer
19	FW	TTO	Scott Sealy
20	DF	USA	Tyson Wahl
21	MF	USA	Lance Watson
22	FW	USA	Davy Arnaud
23	MF	ROU	Alex Zotinca
24	GK	USA	Eric Kronberg
25	MF	USA	Matt Groenwald
26	MF	USA	Ryan Raybould
27	MF	JAM	Jermaine Hue
28			Stephen Shirley
29	FW	USA	Ryan Pore
33	MF	RUS	Sergei Raad
35	MF	USA	Ryan McMahen

== Competitions ==
=== Major League Soccer ===
==== Overall ====
Pos	Team	Pld	W	L	T	GF	GA	GD	Pts	Qualification
1	D.C. United (S)	32	15	7	10	52	38	+14	55	CONCACAF Champions' Cup
2	FC Dallas	32	16	12	4	48	44	+4	52	North American SuperLiga
3	New England Revolution	32	12	8	12	39	35	+4	48	
4	Chicago Fire	32	13	11	8	43	41	+2	47	
5	Houston Dynamo (C)	32	11	8	13	44	40	+4	46	CONCACAF Champions' Cup
6	Chivas USA	32	10	9	13	45	42	+3	43	
7	Colorado Rapids	32	11	13	8	36	49	−13	41	
8	New York Red Bulls	32	9	11	12	41	41	0	39	
9	Los Angeles Galaxy	32	11	15	6	37	37	0	39	North American SuperLiga
10	Real Salt Lake	32	10	13	9	45	49	−4	39	
11	Kansas City Wizards	32	10	14	8	43	45	−2	38	
12	Columbus Crew	32	8	15	9	30	42	−12	33	

Source: MLS
Rules for classification: 1) points; 2) head-to-head record; 3) goal difference; 4) number of goals scored
(C) Champions; (S) Supporters' Shield

==== Conference ====
Pos	Team	Pld	W	L	T	GF	GA	GD	Pts	Qualification
1	D.C. United	32	15	7	10	52	38	+14	55	MLS Cup Playoffs
2	New England Revolution	32	12	8	12	39	35	+4	48	MLS Cup Playoffs
3	Chicago Fire	32	13	11	8	43	41	+2	47	MLS Cup Playoffs
4	New York Red Bulls	32	9	11	12	41	41	0	39	MLS Cup Playoffs
5	Kansas City Wizards	32	10	14	8	43	45	−2	38	
6	Columbus Crew	32	8	15	9	30	42	−12	33	

Source: MLS

Overall								Home						Away					
Pld	W	D	L	GF	GA	GD	Pts	W	D	L	GF	GA	GD	W	D	L	GF	GA	GD
32	10	8	14	43	45	−2	38	7	5	4	31	24	+7	3	3	10	12	21	−9

Last updated: 2006.
Source: Major League Soccer

Date	Opponents	H / A	Result F – A	Scorers	Attendance
April 1, 2006	Columbus Crew	H	3–1	Arnaud; Jewsbury; Johnson
April 8, 2006	Houston Dynamo	A	2–1	Victorine; Burciaga Jr.
April 15, 2006	New England Revolution	H	1–0	Conrad
April 23, 2006	FC Dallas	A	1–2	Zotinca
April 29, 2006	Columbus Crew	A	1–0	Wolff
May 6, 2006	Chicago Fire S.C.	H	1–1	Johnson
May 13, 2006	D.C. United	A	1–2	Victorine
May 20, 2006	Real Salt Lake	A	1–2	Pore
May 27, 2006	D.C. United	H	1–3	Sealy
June 3, 2006	New York Red Bulls	H	1–1	Burciaga Jr.
June 10, 2006	Columbus Crew	A	1–0	Burciaga Jr.
June 17, 2006	Chicago Fire S.C.	H	3–2	Sealy 2 Burciaga Jr.
June 24, 2006	D.C. United	A	0–1
June 28, 2006	D.C. United	H	2–3	Garcia; Burciaga Jr.
July 1, 2006	Los Angeles Galaxy	H	0–2
July 4, 2006	Chicago Fire S.C.	A	0–1
July 8, 2006	Colorado Rapids	A	0–1
July 15, 2006	Houston Dynamo	H	2–3	Wolff; Conrad
July 22, 2006	New York Red Bulls	A	0–1
July 29, 2006	New England Revolution	H	1–1	Wolff
August 9, 2006	New England Revolution	A	0–0
August 12, 2006	Columbus Crew	H	4–0	Arnaud; Sealy; Victorine; Pore
August 16, 2006	Chicago Fire S.C.	A	0–3
August 19, 2006	Chivas USA	A	1–1	Burciaga Jr.
August 27, 2006	FC Dallas	H	1–0	Sealy
August 30, 2006	New York Red Bulls	H	2–2	Sealy; Wolff
September 2, 2006	Los Angeles Galaxy	A	1–2	Thomas
September 9, 2006	Colorado Rapids	H	4–1	Sealy van den Bergh; Arnaud 2
September 23, 2006	New England Revolution	A	1–1	Sealy
September 30, 2006	Real Salt Lake	H	3–3	Wolff; Sealy; Burciaga Jr.
October 7, 2006	Chivas USA	H	2–1	van den Bergh; Burciaga Jr.
October 14, 2006	New York Red Bulls	A	2–3	van den Bergh; Sealy

=== U.S. Open Cup ===
Date	Round	Opponents	H / A	Result F – A	Scorers	Attendance
July 12, 2006	Third Round	Des Moines Menace	H	2–1	Pore; Sealy
August 14, 2006	Fourth Round	Chicago Fire S.C.	A	0–2

== Squad statistics ==
No.	Pos.	Name	MLS		USOC		Total		Minutes		Discipline	
No.	Pos.	Name	Apps	Goals	Apps	Goals	Apps	Goals	League	Total	Yellow card	Red card
22	FW	(United States) Davy Arnaud	32	4	0	0	32	4	2785	2785	0	0
9	MF	(United States) Sasha Victorine	31	3	1	0	32	3	2701	2717	0	0
6	DF	(United States) Jose Burciaga Jr.	30	8	0	0	30	8	2590	2590	0	0
19	FW	(Trinidad and Tobago) Scott Sealy	29	10	1	1	30	11	1762	1852	0	0
1	GK	(United States) Bo Oshoniyi	29	0	0	0	29	0	2610	2610	0	0
3	DF	(United States) Nick Garcia	29	1	0	0	29	1	2519	2519	0	0
14	MF	(United States) Jack Jewsbury	28	1	1	0	29	1	1817	1907	0	0
4	DF	(Jamaica) Shavar Thomas	26	1	1	0	27	1	2147	2237	0	0
5	MF	(United States) Kerry Zavagnin	25	0	1	0	26	0	2069	2159	0	0
23	MF	(Romania) Alex Zotinca	24	1	0	0	24	1	1303	1303	0	0
7	FW	(United States) Eddie Johnson	19	2	2	0	21	2	1480	1505	0	0
25	MF	(United States) Matt Groenwald	19	0	2	0	21	0	1221	1287	0	0
29	FW	(United States) Ryan Pore	19	2	2	1	21	3	563	728	0	0
15	FW	(United States) Josh Wolff	19	5	1	0	20	5	1587	1608	0	0
12	DF	(United States) Jimmy Conrad	15	2	0	0	15	2	1252	1252	0	0
11	MF	(Netherlands) Dave van den Bergh	13	3	0	0	13	2	991	991	0	0
21	MF	(United States) Lance Watson	11	0	1	0	12	0	450	530	0	0
17	FW	(Armenia) Yura Movsisyan	10	0	2	0	12	0	221	335	0	0
20	DF	(United States) Tyson Wahl	10	0	1	0	11	0	607	697	0	0
26	MF	(United States) Ryan Raybould	8	0	1	0	9	0	583	673	0	0
18	GK	(United States) Will Hesmer	3	0	2	0	5	0	270	450	0	0
16	DF	(United States) Brian Roberts	1	0	2	0	3	0	17	197	0	0
13	FW	(United States) Will John	1	0	2	0	3	0	3	138	0	0
33	MF	(Russia) Sergei Raad	1	0	2	0	3	0	22	136	0	0
28	--	Stephen Shirley	0	0	2	0	2	0	0	180	0	0
35	MF	(United States) Ryan McMahen	0	0	2	0	2	0	0	164	0	0
27	MF	(Jamaica) Jermaine Hue	2	0	0	0	2	0	51	51	0	0

Final Statistics
