= 2016 in Brazilian football =

Football in Brazil
- Season: 2016

Men's football
- Série A: Palmeiras
- Série B: Atlético Goianiense
- Série C: Boa Esporte
- Série D: Volta Redonda

The following article presents a summary of the 2016 football (soccer) season in Brazil, which was the 115th season of competitive football in the country.

== Campeonato Brasileiro Série A ==
The 2016 Campeonato Brasileiro Série A started on May 14, 2016, and concluded on December 11, 2016.

- América Mineiro
- Atlético Mineiro
- Atlético Paranaense
- Botafogo
- Chapecoense
- Corinthians
- Coritiba
- Cruzeiro
- Figueirense
- Flamengo
- Fluminense
- Grêmio
- Internacional
- Palmeiras
- Ponte Preta
- Santa Cruz
- Santos
- São Paulo
- Sport
- Vitória

Pos	Team	Pld	W	D	L	GF	GA	GD	Pts	Qualification or relegation
1	Palmeiras (C)	38	24	8	6	62	32	+30	80	Qualification for 2017 Copa Libertadores group stage
2	Santos	38	22	5	11	59	35	+24	71	Qualification for 2017 Copa Libertadores group stage
3	Flamengo	38	20	11	7	52	35	+17	71	Qualification for 2017 Copa Libertadores group stage
4	Atlético Mineiro	38	17	11	10	61	53	+8	62 (Note: The matchday 38 game between Chapecoense and Atlético Mineiro was cancelled after both teams declined to play following the Chapecoense team plane crash. Both teams received a double walkover (3–0 loss for each team).)	Qualification for 2017 Copa Libertadores group stage
5	Botafogo	38	17	8	13	43	39	+4	59	Qualification for 2017 Copa Libertadores first stage
6	Atlético Paranaense	38	17	6	15	38	32	+6	57	Qualification for 2017 Copa Libertadores first stage
7	Corinthians	38	15	10	13	48	42	+6	55	Qualification for 2017 Copa Sudamericana
8	Ponte Preta	38	15	8	15	48	52	−4	53	Qualification for 2017 Copa Sudamericana
9	Grêmio	38	14	11	13	41	44	−3	53	Qualification for 2017 Copa Libertadores group stage
10	São Paulo	38	14	10	14	44	36	+8	52	Qualification for 2017 Copa Sudamericana
11	Chapecoense	38	13	13	12	49	56	−7	52	Qualification for 2017 Copa Libertadores group stage
12	Cruzeiro	38	14	9	15	48	49	−1	51	Qualification for 2017 Copa Sudamericana
13	Fluminense	38	13	11	14	45	45	0	50	Qualification for 2017 Copa Sudamericana
14	Sport	38	13	8	17	49	55	−6	47	Qualification for 2017 Copa Sudamericana
15	Coritiba	38	11	13	14	41	42	−1	46	
16	Vitória	38	12	9	17	51	53	−2	45	
17	Internacional (R)	38	11	10	17	35	41	−6	43	Relegation to 2017 Campeonato Brasileiro Série B
18	Figueirense (R)	38	8	13	17	30	50	−20	37	Relegation to 2017 Campeonato Brasileiro Série B
19	Santa Cruz (R)	38	8	7	23	45	69	−24	31	Relegation to 2017 Campeonato Brasileiro Série B
20	América Mineiro (R)	38	7	7	24	23	58	−35	28	Relegation to 2017 Campeonato Brasileiro Série B

Source: CBF
Rules for classification: 1) points; 2) wins; 3) goal difference; 4) goals scored; 5) head-to-head results; 6) least red cards received; 7) least yellow cards received; 8) draw.
(C) Champions; (R) Relegated
Notes:

Palmeiras won the Campeonato Brasileiro Série A.

=== Relegation ===
The four worst placed teams, which are Internacional, Figueirense, Santa Cruz and América Mineiro, were relegated to the following year's second level.

== Campeonato Brasileiro Série B ==
The 2016 Campeonato Brasileiro Série B started on May 13, 2016, and concluded on November 26, 2016.

- Atlético Goianiense
- Avaí
- Bahia
- Bragantino
- Brasil de Pelotas
- Ceará
- CRB
- Criciúma
- Goiás
- Joinville
- Luverdense
- Londrina
- Náutico
- Oeste
- Paraná
- Paysandu
- Sampaio Corrêa
- Tupi
- Vasco da Gama
- Vila Nova

Pos	Team	Pld	W	D	L	GF	GA	GD	Pts	Qualification or relegation
1	Atlético Goianiense (P, C)	38	22	10	6	60	35	+25	76	Promotion to 2017 Campeonato Brasileiro Série A
2	Avaí (P)	38	19	9	10	45	34	+11	66	Promotion to 2017 Campeonato Brasileiro Série A
3	Vasco da Gama (P)	38	19	8	11	54	41	+13	65	Promotion to 2017 Campeonato Brasileiro Série A
4	Bahia (P)	38	18	9	11	57	34	+23	63	Promotion to 2017 Campeonato Brasileiro Série A
5	Náutico	38	18	6	14	55	43	+12	60	
6	Londrina	38	16	12	10	40	29	+11	60	
7	CRB	38	17	7	14	57	54	+3	58	
8	Criciúma	38	16	8	14	49	46	+3	56	
9	Luverdense	38	13	16	9	43	39	+4	55	
10	Ceará	38	14	12	12	49	47	+2	54	
11	Brasil de Pelotas	38	14	12	12	40	38	+2	54	
12	Vila Nova	38	15	8	15	54	52	+2	53	
13	Goiás	38	13	11	14	49	48	+1	50	
14	Paysandu	38	11	16	11	40	44	−4	49	
15	Paraná	38	10	11	17	39	55	−16	41	
16	Oeste	38	8	17	13	32	46	−14	41	
17	Joinville (R)	38	9	13	16	32	42	−10	40	Relegation to 2017 Campeonato Brasileiro Série C
18	Tupi (R)	38	8	9	21	40	56	−16	33	Relegation to 2017 Campeonato Brasileiro Série C
19	Bragantino (R)	38	8	8	22	30	54	−24	32	Relegation to 2017 Campeonato Brasileiro Série C
20	Sampaio Corrêa (R)	38	5	12	21	29	57	−28	27	Relegation to 2017 Campeonato Brasileiro Série C

Source: Soccerway.com
Rules for classification: 1) points; 2) wins; 3) goal difference; 4) goals scored; 5) head-to-head results; 6) least red cards received; 7) least yellow cards received; 8) draw.
(C) Champions; (P) Promoted; (R) Relegated

Atlético Goianiense won the Campeonato Brasileiro Série B.

=== Promotion ===
The four best placed teams, which are Atlético Goianiense, Avaí, Vasco da Gama and Bahia, were promoted to the following year's first level.

=== Relegation ===
The four worst placed teams, which are Joinville, Tupi, Bragantino and Sampaio Corrêa, were relegated to the following year's third level.

== Campeonato Brasileiro Série C ==
The 2016 Campeonato Brasileiro Série C started on May 21, 2016, and concluded on November 5, 2016.

- ABC
- América de Natal
- ASA
- Boa Esporte
- Botafogo-PB
- Botafogo-SP
- Confiança
- Cuiabá
- Fortaleza
- Guarani
- Guaratinguetá
- Juventude
- Macaé
- Mogi Mirim
- Portuguesa
- Remo
- Ríver
- Salgueiro
- Tombense
- Ypiranga de Erechim

The Campeonato Brasileiro Série C final was played between Boa Esporte and Guarani.

October 29, 2016

Guarani	1–1	Boa Esporte

Estádio Brinco de Ouro

November 15, 2016

Boa Esporte	3–0	Guarani

Estádio Melão

Boa Esporte won the league after beating Guarani by aggregate score of 4–1.

=== Promotion ===
The four best placed teams, which are Boa Esporte, Guarani, ABC and Juventude, were promoted to the following year's second level.

=== Relegation ===
The four worst placed teams, which are América de Natal, Portuguesa, Ríver and Guaratinguetá, were relegated to the following year's fourth level.

== Campeonato Brasileiro Série D ==
The 2016 Campeonato Brasileiro Série D started on June 12, 2016, and concluded on October 2, 2016.

- Águia de Marabá
- Altos
- América-PE
- Aparecidense
- Anápolis
- Araguaia
- Atlético Acreano
- Audax
- Baré
- Boavista
- Brusque
- Caldense
- Campinense
- Caxias
- Ceilândia
- Central
- Comercial
- CSA
- Desportiva Ferroviária
- Espírito Santo
- Fluminense de Feira
- Galícia
- Genus
- Globo
- Goianésia
- Guarani
- Icasa
- Internacional de Lages
- Itabaiana
- Ituano
- J. Malucelli
- Juazeirense
- Linense
- Luziânia
- Madureira
- Maranhão
- Maringá
- Metropolitano
- Moto Club
- Murici
- Nacional
- Náutico-RR
- Novo Hamburgo
- Palmas
- Parnahyba
- Portuguesa-RJ
- Potiguar
- Princesa do Solimões
- PSTC
- Rio Branco
- Rondoniense
- Santos-AP
- São Bento
- São Francisco
- São José-RS
- São Paulo-RS
- São Raimundo
- Sergipe
- Serra Talhada
- Sete de Setembro
- Sinop
- Sousa
- Tocantinópolis
- Trem
- Uniclinic
- URT
- Villa Nova
- Volta Redonda

The Campeonato Brasileiro Série D final was played between Volta Redonda and CSA.

September 25, 2016

CSA	0–0	Volta Redonda

Estádio Rei Pelé

October 1, 2016

Volta Redonda	4–0	CSA

Estádio Raulino de Oliveira

Volta Redonda won the league after beating CSA by aggregate score of 4–0.

=== Promotion ===
The four best placed teams, which are Volta Redonda, CSA, São Bento and Moto Club, were promoted to the following year's third level.

== Domestic cups ==
=== Copa do Brasil ===
The competition started on March 16, 2016, and concluded on December 7, 2016. The Copa do Brasil final was played between Atlético Mineiro and Grêmio.

November 23, 2016

Atlético Mineiro	1–3	Grêmio

Mineirão, Belo Horizonte

December 7, 2016

Grêmio	1–1	Atlético Mineiro

Arena do Grêmio, Porto Alegre

Grêmio won the cup by aggregate score of 4–1.

=== Copa do Nordeste ===
The competition featured 20 clubs from the Northeastern region. It started on February 14, 2016 and concluded on May 1, 2016. The Copa do Nordeste final was played between Santa Cruz and Campinense.

April 27, 2016

Santa Cruz	2–1	Campinense

Estádio do Arruda, Recife

May 1, 2016

Campinense	1–1	Santa Cruz

Estádio Governador Ernani Sátyro, Campina Grande

Santa Cruz won the cup after defeating Campinense.

=== Copa Verde ===
The competition featured 18 clubs from the North and Central-West regions, including Espírito Santo champions. It started on February 6, 2016 and concluded on May 10, 2016. The Copa Verde final was played between Paysandu and Gama.

May 3, 2016

Paysandu	2–0	Gama

Mangueirão, Belém

May 10, 2016

Gama	2–1	Paysandu

Bezerrão, Gama

Paysandu won the cup after defeating Gama.

=== Primeira Liga ===
The competition featured 12 clubs from the South and Southeastern regions, including Minas Gerais and Rio de Janeiro State teams. It started on January 27, 2016 and concluded on April 20, 2016. The Primeira Liga final was played between Fluminense and Atlético Paranaense.

April 14, 2016

Fluminense	1–0	Atlético Paranaense

Estádio Helenão, Juiz de Fora

Fluminense won the cup after defeating Atlético Paranaense 1–0.

== State championship champions ==
State	Champion
(Acre (state)) Acre	Atlético Acreano
Alagoas	CRB
Amapá	Santos-AP
(Amazonas (Brazilian state)) Amazonas	Fast
Bahia	Vitória
Ceará	Fortaleza
(Federal District (Brazil)) Distrito Federal	Luziânia
Espírito Santo	Desportiva Ferroviária
Goiás	Goiás
Maranhão	Moto Club
Mato Grosso	Luverdense
Mato Grosso do Sul	Sete de Dourados
Minas Gerais	América Mineiro
Pará	Paysandu
Paraíba	Campinense
(Paraná (state)) Paraná	Atlético Paranaense
Pernambuco	Santa Cruz
Piauí	Ríver
(Rio de Janeiro (state)) Rio de Janeiro	Vasco
Rio Grande do Norte	ABC
Rio Grande do Sul	Internacional
Rondônia	Rondoniense
Roraima	São Raimundo-RR
(Santa Catarina (state)) Santa Catarina	Chapecoense
(São Paulo (state)) São Paulo	Santos
Sergipe	Sergipe
Tocantins	Gurupi

== Youth competition champions ==
Competition	Champion
Campeonato Brasileiro Sub-20	Botafogo
Copa do Brasil Sub-17^{(1)}	Corinthians
Copa do Brasil Sub-20	São Paulo
Copa RS de Futebol Sub-20	São Paulo
Copa Santiago de Futebol Juvenil	Cruzeiro de Santiago
Copa São Paulo de Futebol Júnior	Flamengo
Taça Belo Horizonte de Juniores	São Paulo
Copa 2 de Julho Sub-15	Flamengo

^{(1)} The Copa Nacional do Espírito Santo Sub-17, between 2008 and 2012, was named Copa Brasil Sub-17. The similar named Copa do Brasil Sub-17 is organized by the Brazilian Football Confederation and it was first played in 2013.

== Other competition champions ==
Competition	Champion
Copa Espírito Santo	Rio Branco-ES
Copa Paulista	XV de Piracicaba
Copa Rio	Portuguesa-RJ

== Brazilian clubs in international competitions ==
Team	2016 Copa Libertadores	2016 Copa Sudamericana
Atlético Mineiro	Quarterfinals eliminated by (Brazil) São Paulo	N/A
Corinthians	Round of 16 eliminated by (Uruguay) Nacional	N/A
Chapecoense	N/A	Champions title awarded by CONMEBOL
Coritiba	N/A	Quarterfinals eliminated by (Colombia) Atlético Nacional
Cuiabá	N/A	Second Stage eliminated by (Brazil) Chapecoense
Figueirense	N/A	Second Stage eliminated by (Brazil) Flamengo
Flamengo	N/A	Round of 16 eliminated by (Chile) Palestino
Grêmio	Round of 16 eliminated by (Argentina) Rosario Central	N/A
Palmeiras	Eliminated in the Second Stage	N/A
Santa Cruz	N/A	Round of 16 eliminated by (Colombia) Independiente Medellín
São Paulo	Semifinals eliminated by (Colombia) Atlético Nacional	N/A
Sport Recife	N/A	Second Stage eliminated by (Brazil) Santa Cruz
Vitória	N/A	Second Stage eliminated by (Brazil) Coritiba

== Brazil national team ==
The following table lists all the games played by the Brazilian national team in official competitions and friendly matches during 2016.

=== Friendlies ===
May 29	Brazil	2–0	Panama	Commerce City, United States
22:30 UTC−03	Jonas 2'; Gabriel 73'	Report		Stadium: Dick's Sporting Goods Park; Referee: Armando Castro (Honduras)

=== Copa América Centenario ===
June 4 Group stage	Brazil	0–0	Ecuador	Pasadena, United States
22:00		Report (CONMEBOL); Report (CONCACAF)		Stadium: Rose Bowl; Attendance: 53,158; Referee: Julio Bascuñán (Chile)

June 8 Group stage	Brazil	7–1	Haiti	Orlando, United States
19:30	Coutinho 14', 29', 90+2'; Renato Augusto 35', 86'; Gabriel 59'; Lucas Lima 67'	Report (CONMEBOL); Report (CONCACAF)	Marcelin 70'	Stadium: Camping World Stadium; Attendance: 28,241; Referee: Mark Geiger (United States)

June 12 Group stage	Brazil	0–1	Peru	Foxborough, United States
20:30		Report (CONMEBOL); Report (CONCACAF)	Ruidíaz 75'	Stadium: Gillette Stadium; Attendance: 36,187; Referee: Andrés Cunha (Uruguay)

=== 2018 FIFA World Cup qualification ===
March 25	Brazil	2–2	Uruguay	São Lourenço da Mata, Brazil
21:45 (UTC−03)	Douglas Costa 1'; Renato Augusto 25'	Report (FIFA); Report (CONMEBOL)	Cavani 30'; Suárez 48'	Stadium: Arena Pernambuco; Attendance: 45,010; Referee: Néstor Pitana (Argentina)

March 29	Paraguay	2–2	Brazil	Asunción, Paraguay
20:45 UTC−4	Lezcano 40'; E. Benítez 49'	Report (FIFA); Report (CONMEBOL)	Oliveira 79'; Alves 90+2'	Stadium: Estadio Defensores del Chaco; Referee: Wilmar Roldán (Colombia)

September 1	Ecuador	0–3	Brazil	Quito, Ecuador
16:00 UTC−5		Report (FIFA); Report (CONMEBOL)	Neymar 72' (pen.); Gabriel Jesus 87', 90+2'	Stadium: Estadio Olímpico Atahualpa; Referee: Enrique Cáceres (Paraguay)

September 6	Brazil	2–1	Colombia	Manaus, Brazil
20:45 UTC−4	Miranda 2'; Neymar 74'	Report (FIFA); Report (CONMEBOL)	Marquinhos 37' (o.g.)	Stadium: Arena da Amazônia; Attendance: 36,609; Referee: Patricio Loustau (Argentina)

October 6	Brazil	5–0	Bolivia	Natal, Brazil
21:45 UTC−3	Neymar 11'; Coutinho 26'; Filipe Luís 39'; Gabriel Jesus 44'; Firmino 75'	Report (FIFA); Report (CONMEBOL)		Stadium: Arena das Dunas; Referee: Wilson Lamouroux (Colombia)

October 11	Venezuela	0–2	Brazil	Mérida, Venezuela
20:30 UTC−4		Report (FIFA); Report (CONMEBOL)	Gabriel Jesus 8'; Willian 53'	Stadium: Estadio Metropolitano de Mérida; Referee: Víctor Carrillo (Peru)

November 10	Brazil	3–0	Argentina	Belo Horizonte, Brazil
21:45 UTC−2	Coutinho 24'; Neymar 45'; Paulinho 59'	Report (FIFA); Report (CONMEBOL)		Stadium: Mineirão; Attendance: 54,490; Referee: Julio Bascuñán (Chile)

November 15	Peru	0–2	Brazil	Lima, Peru
21:15 UTC−5		Report (FIFA); Report (CONMEBOL)	Gabriel Jesus 57'; Renato Augusto 78'	Stadium: Estadio Nacional de Lima; Referee: Wilmar Roldán (Colombia)

== Women's football ==
=== National team ===
The following table lists all the games played by the Brazil women's national football team in official competitions and friendly matches during 2016.

==== Friendlies ====
June 4	Canada	0–2	Brazil	Toronto, Canada
		Report	Marta (?)	Stadium: BMO Field; Referee: Ekaterina Koroleva (United States)

June 7	Canada	1–0	Brazil	Ottawa, Canada
	Beckie (?)	Report		Stadium: TD Place; Referee: Francia Gonzalez (Mexico)

July 23	Brazil	3–1	Australia	Fortaleza, Brazil
16:00	Debinha 59'; Raquel 71'; Darlene 90+2'		Crummer 31'	Stadium: Estádio Presidente Vargas; Attendance: 81,338; Referee: Ana Karina Marques (Brazil)

September 16	France	1–1	Brazil	Grenoble, France
	Lavogez 2'		Marta 8'

==== Algarve Cup ====
March 2, 2016 Group stage	Brazil	1–0	New Zealand	Lagos, Portugal
18:30	Debinha 20'	Report		Stadium: Lagos Municipal Stadium; Referee: Marianela Araya (Costa Rica)

March 4, 2016 Group stage	Portugal	1–3	Brazil	Vila Real de Santo António, Portugal
20:00	T. Pinto 30'	Report	Cristiane 17'; Marta 22'; Raquel 74'	Stadium: VRS António Sports Complex; Referee: Monika Mularczyk (Poland)

March 7, 2016 Group stage	Brazil	3–0	Russia	Lagos, Portugal
15:00	Formiga 51'; Bia 66'; Thaís Guedes 89'	Report		Stadium: Lagos Municipal Stadium; Referee: Sandra Braz (Portugal)

March 9, 2016 Final	Canada	2–1	Brazil	Parchal, Portugal
18:30	Zadorsky 60'; Beckie 67'	Report	Andressa Alves 90'	Stadium: Bela Vista Municipal Stadium; Referee: Sara Persson (Sweden)

==== Summer Olympics ====
August 3, 2016 Group stage	Brazil	3–0	China	Rio de Janeiro, Brazil
16:00	Monica 36'; Andressa 59'; Cristiane 90'	Report (Rio2016); Report (FIFA)		Stadium: Estádio Olímpico João Havelange; Attendance: 27,618; Referee: Carol Chenard (Canada)

August 6, 2016 Group stage	Brazil	5–1	Sweden	Rio de Janeiro, Brazil
22:00	Beatriz 21', 86'; Cristiane 24'; Marta 44' (pen.), 80'	Report (Rio2016); Report (FIFA)	Schelin 89'	Stadium: Estádio Olímpico João Havelange; Attendance: 43,384; Referee: Lucila Venegas (Mexico)

August 9, 2016 Group stage	South Africa	0–0	Brazil	Manaus, Brazil
21:00		Report (Rio2016); Report (FIFA)		Stadium: Arena da Amazônia; Attendance: 38,415; Referee: Stéphanie Frappart (France)

August 12, 2016 Quarter-finals	Brazil	0–0 (7–6 p)	Australia	Belo Horizonte, Brazil
22:00		Report (Rio2016); Report (FIFA)		Stadium: Mineirão; Attendance: 52,660; Referee: Carol Chenard (Canada)
	Penalties
	Andressa Alves (penalty scored); Andressa (penalty scored); Beatriz (penalty scored); Rafaelle (penalty scored); Marta (penalty missed); Debinha (penalty scored); Monica (penalty scored); Tamires (penalty scored)		(penalty scored) Kellond-Knight; (penalty scored) Alleway; (penalty scored) van Egmond; (penalty scored) Polkinghorne; (penalty missed) Gorry; (penalty scored) Heyman; (penalty scored) Logarzo; (penalty missed) Kennedy

August 16, 2016 Semi-finals	Brazil	0–0 (3–4 p)	Sweden	Rio de Janeiro, Brazil
13:00		Report (FIFA)		Stadium: Maracanã; Attendance: 70,454; Referee: Lucila Venegas (Mexico)
	Penalties
	Marta (penalty scored); Cristiane (penalty missed); Andressa Alves (penalty scored); Rafaelle (penalty scored); Andressa (penalty missed)		(penalty scored) Schelin; (penalty missed) Asllani; (penalty scored) Seger; (penalty scored) Fischer; (penalty scored) Dahlkvist

August 19, 2016 Bronze medal match	Brazil	1–2	Canada	São Paulo, Brazil
13:00	Beatriz 79'	Report (Rio2016); Report (FIFA)	Rose 25'; Sinclair 52'	Stadium: Arena Corinthians; Attendance: 39,718; Referee: Teodora Albon (Romania)

==== Torneio de Manaus ====
December 7, 2016 Group Stage	Brazil	6–0	Costa Rica	Manaus, Brazil
22:45	Andressinha 25'; Tamires 28'; Gabi Zanotti 45', 47'; Bia 53', 73'	report		Stadium: Arena da Amazônia

December 11, 2016 Group Stage	Brazil	4–0	Russia	Manaus, Brazil
18:45	Bia 12', 49'; Debinha 14', 60'	Report		Stadium: Arena da Amazônia

December 14, 2016 Group Stage	Brazil	3–1	Italy	Manaus, Brazil
22:45	Andressinha 30'; Bartoli 76' (o.g.); Debinha 90+1'	Report	Parisi 45' (pen.)	Stadium: Arena da Amazônia

December 18, 2016 Final	Brazil	5–3	Italy	Manaus, Brazil
18:45	Bia 8'; Gabi 20'; Andressa 36', 47'; Gabi Nunes 60'	Report	Mauro 14'; Gabbiadini 32'; Bonansea	Stadium: Arena da Amazônia

The Brazil women's national football team competed in the following competitions in 2016:

Competition	Performance
Algarve Cup	Runners-up
Summer Olympics	Fourth-place
Torneio Internacional Feminino	Champions

== Campeonato Brasileiro de Futebol Feminino ==
The 2016 Campeonato Brasileiro de Futebol Feminino started on January 20, 2016, and concluded on May 25, 2016. The Campeonato Brasileiro de Futebol Feminino final was played between Flamengo/Marinha and Rio Preto.

May 17

Flamengo/Marinha	0–1	Rio Preto

Estádio de Los Larios, Duque de Caxias

May 20

Rio Preto	1–2	Flamengo/Marinha

Estádio Anísio Haddad, São José do Rio Preto

Flamengo/Marinha won the league after defeating Rio Preto.

=== Copa do Brasil de Futebol Feminino ===
The 2016 Copa do Brasil de Futebol Feminino started on August 24, 2016, and concluded on October 26, 2016. The Copa do Brasil de Futebol Feminino final was played between Corinthians/Audax and São José.

October 19

São José	2–2	Corinthians/Audax

Estádio Martins Pereira, São José dos Campos

October 26

Corinthians/Audax	3–1	São José

Estádio José Liberatti, Osasco

Corinthians/Audax won the league after defeating São José.

=== Domestic competition champions ===
Competition	Champion
Campeonato Carioca	Flamengo/Marinha
Campeonato Paulista	Rio Preto

=== Brazilian clubs in international competitions ===
Team	2016 Copa Libertadores Femenina
Ferroviária	Eliminated in the group stage
Foz Cataratas	Third-place defeated (Uruguay) Colón
