= Dalton (footballer, born 1990) =

Brazilian footballer

Personal information
- Full name: Dalton Moreira Neto
- Date of birth: February 5, 1991 (age 35)
- Place of birth: Rio de Janeiro, Brazil
- Height: 1.87 m (6 ft 1 1/2 in)
- Position: Defender

Team information
- Current team: Bangu

Senior career*
Years	Team	Apps	(Gls)
2009–2010	Fluminense	13	(0)
2010–2013	Internacional	1	(0)
2011	→ Atlético Paranaense (loan)	0	(0)
2012	→ Criciúma (loan)	1	(0)
2014–2016	Universitario	0	(0)
2016	Fort Lauderdale Strikers	6	(0)
2017	Luverdense		
2018	Bangu		
Total		21	(0)

International career
2009	Brazil U20	10	(0)
- * Club domestic league appearances and goals

Dalton Moreira Neto, usually known as Dalton (born 5 February 1990) is a Brazilian former footballer who played as a defender.

== Professional ==
On 14 March 2011, Dalton signed a one-year loan deal with Paranaense.

He later moved to Club Universitario de Deportes in Peruvian Primera Division.

In February 2016, Dalton signed with Fort Lauderdale Strikers of the North American Soccer League.

On 1 May 2018, Dalton retired from professional football.

== Honours ==
Luverdense

- Copa Verde: 2017
