= Sergei Raad =

Russian footballer (born 1982)

Personal information
- Full name: Sergei Kolomeites Raad
- Date of birth: August 3, 1982 (age 44)
- Place of birth: Leningrad, Soviet Union
- Height: 5 ft 9 in (1.75 m)
- Position: Midfielder

Team information
- Current team: FC JAX Destroyers
- Number: 21

Youth career
- 2000–2004: Furman Paladins

Senior career*
Years	Team	Apps	(Gls)
2004	Calgary Mustangs	20	(4)
2005	Central Florida Kraze	6	(0)
2006	Kansas City Wizards	1	(0)
2007	Central Florida Kraze	1	(0)
2010	Central Florida Kraze	13	(3)
2011–	FC JAX Destroyers	6	(1)
- * Club domestic league appearances and goals as of June 10, 2011

Sergei Kolomeites Raad (born August 3, 1982) is a Russian footballer who currently plays for FC JAX Destroyers in the USL Premier Development League.

== Career ==
=== Youth and college ===
Raad's birth name is Sergei Kolomeites. He moved to the United States in 1995 after his Russian club team came to Orlando, Florida to play in a tournament; he was sponsored by a local family and obtained a student visa so he could learn English, and eventually took on the surname of his adoptive family, Raad. He attended Oviedo High School and played college soccer at Furman University from 2000 to 2004, where he appeared in 62 games, notching 20 goals and 29 assists.

=== Professional ===
Raad turned professional in 2004 when he joined the now-defunct A-League team, the Calgary Mustangs. With the Mustangs he played in 20 games, scoring 4 goals and contributing 2 assists, before being released at the end of the season when the team folded.

He spent the early months of 2005 training with Zenit St. Petersburg, but was not offered a contract by the Russian team, and instead returned to the United States, playing for Central Florida Kraze in the USL Premier Development League.

He trained with Major League Soccer side New England Revolution during the second half of 2005, and must have impressed some scouts, as he signed a developmental contract with the Kansas City Wizards on April 1, 2006. He played in one MLS game during the season, before being waived at the end of the 2006 season.

During early 2007 Raad was training with the Seattle Sounders, but eventually returned home to play PDL soccer with the Central Florida Kraze again in 2007. After a couple of years out of the game in 2008 and 2009 Raad embarked on a third stint with the Kraze in 2010; he scored his first ever goal for the team in their 2010 season opener, a 3–1 win over Fort Lauderdale Schulz Academy.

In 2011, Raad signed with the new PDL expansion team, FC Jax Destroyers.
