= 2016 Campeonato Sul-Mato-Grossense =

Campeonato Sul-Mato-Grossense
- Season: 2016

The 2016 Campeonato Sul-Mato-Grossense was the 38th season of Mato Grosso do Sul's top professional football league. The competition began on January 31 and ends in May.

== Format ==
- First Stage: double round-robin, in which all teams are split into two groups off six and they play each other home-and-away games.
- Second Stage: the top four teams from each group will advance to play-offs stage.

The winner of second stage is crowned the champion.

The two teams last placed in the first stage are relegated to Campeonato Sul-Mato Grossense (lower levels).

== Participating teams ==
Team	Stadium	Capacity
Águia Negra	Estádio Ninho da Águia, Rio Brilhante	3,000
Aquidauanense	Estádio Municipal de Aquidauana, Aquidauana	5,000
Chapadão	Estádio Municipal de Chapadão, Chapadão do Sul	3,000
Comercial	Morenão, Campo Grande	45,000
Corumbaense	Estádio Arthur Marinho, Corumbá	15,000
Costa Rica	Estádio Municipal Laerte Paes Coelho, Costa Rica	5,000
Sete de Setembro	Douradão, Dourados	30,000
Ivinhema	Estádio Luís Saraiva Vieira, Ivinhema	5,000
Misto	Estádio Benedito Soares Mota, Três Lagoas	6,000
Naviraiense	Virotão, Naviraí	4,000
Novoperário	Estádio Jacques da Luz, Campo Grande	4,500
Operário	Morenão, Campo Grande	45,000

== First stage ==
=== Group A ===
Pos	Team	Pld	W	D	L	GF	GA	GD	Pts	Qualification or relegation
1	Operário	3	2	1	0	5	2	+3	7	Qualification to the Play-offs
2	Costa Rica	3	2	0	1	6	2	+4	6	Qualification to the Play-offs
3	Novoperário	3	1	2	0	6	4	+2	5	Qualification to the Play-offs
4	Comercial	3	1	2	0	3	1	+2	5	Qualification to the Play-offs
5	Chapadão	4	0	2	2	2	8	−6	2	
6	Misto	4	0	1	3	2	7	−5	1	Relegation to the 2017 Campeonato Sul-Mato-Grossense (lower levels)

Updated to match(es) played on 28 February 2016. Source: Standings
Rules for classification: 1) points; 2) goal difference; 3) number of goals scored.

=== Group B ===
Pos	Team	Pld	W	D	L	GF	GA	GD	Pts	Qualification or relegation
1	Sete de Setembro	3	2	0	1	5	3	+2	6	Qualification to the Play-offs
2	Águia Negra	3	2	0	1	2	2	0	6	Qualification to the Play-offs
3	Corumbaense	3	1	1	1	4	3	+1	4	Qualification to the Play-offs
4	Naviraiense	4	1	1	2	4	5	−1	4	Qualification to the Play-offs
5	Ivinhema	3	0	3	0	3	3	0	3	
6	Aquidauanense	2	0	1	1	2	4	−2	1	Relegation to the 2017 Campeonato Sul-Mato-Grossense (lower levels)

Updated to match(es) played on 28 February 2016. Source: Standings
Rules for classification: 1) points; 2) goal difference; 3) number of goals scored.
