= 2016 Campeonato Mato-Grossense =

Campeonato Mato-Grossense
- Season: 2015

The 2016 Campeonato Mato-Grossense is the 74th season of the Mato Grosso's top professional football league. The competition began on 30 January 2016.

== Teams ==
A total of eleven sides compete in the 2016 season. They were split into two groups, (A and B, 6 sides and 5 sides respectively). The top four sides from both groups will qualify for the second phase. The bottom side in Group A will be relegated to the Campeonato Mat-Grossense (lower levels).

- Araguaia
- Cacerense
- CEOV
- Cuiabá EC
- Dom Bosco
- Luverdense
- Mixto
- Operário Ltda
- Poconé
- Sinop
- União de Rondonópolis

== First stage ==
=== Group A ===
Pos	Team	Pld	W	D	L	GF	GA	GD	Pts	Qualification or relegation
1	Luverdense	6	4	2	0	15	5	+10	14	Qualification to the play-offs
2	CEOV	6	3	2	1	9	9	0	11	Qualification to the play-offs
3	Sinop	6	3	1	2	6	4	+2	10	Qualification to the play-offs
4	Mixto	6	2	2	2	9	10	−1	8	Qualification to the play-offs
5	Cacerense	6	1	2	3	8	12	−4	5	
6	Poconé	6	0	1	5	6	13	−7	1	Relegation to the 2017 Campeonato Mato-Grossense (lower levels)

Updated to match(es) played on 26 February 2016. Source: Group A
Rules for classification: 1) points; 2) goal difference; 3) number of goals scored.

=== Group B ===
Pos	Team	Pld	W	D	L	GF	GA	GD	Pts	Qualification
1	EC	4	3	1	0	9	0	+9	10	Qualification to the play-offs
2	Araguaia	5	3	1	1	5	6	−1	10	Qualification to the play-offs
3	União de Rondonópolis	5	1	3	1	4	2	+2	6	Qualification to the play-offs
4	Dom Bosco	5	1	2	2	4	6	−2	5	Qualification to the play-offs
5	Operário Ltda	5	0	1	4	2	10	−8	1	

Updated to match(es) played on 26 February 2016. Source: Group B
Rules for classification: 1) points; 2) goal difference; 3) number of goals scored.
