= Tyson Wahl =

American soccer player

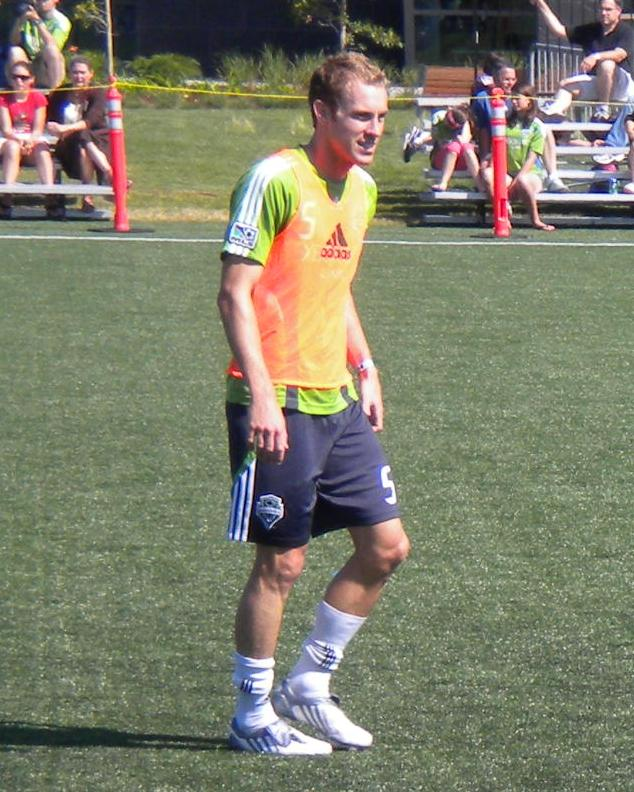

Personal information
- Full name: Tyson Wahl
- Date of birth: February 23, 1984 (age 42)
- Place of birth: Newport Beach, California, United States
- Height: 6 ft 2 in (1.88 m)
- Position: Defender

Youth career
- 1998–2002: Irvine Strikers
- 2001: IMG Soccer Academy

College career
Years	Team	Apps	(Gls)
2002–2005	California Golden Bears	85	(8)

Senior career*
Years	Team	Apps	(Gls)
2004–2005	Orange County Blue Star	21	(1)
2006–2008	Kansas City Wizards	32	(0)
2009–2011	Seattle Sounders FC	39	(1)
2012	Montreal Impact	11	(0)
2012	Colorado Rapids	4	(0)
2013–2016	Columbus Crew SC	74	(0)
Total		181	(2)

International career
2001	United States U17	3	(0)
- * Club domestic league appearances and goals

Tyson Wahl (born February 23, 1984) is an American retired soccer player.

== Career ==
=== Youth and college ===
Wahl played club soccer for Slammers FC coached by Walid and Ziad Khoury, and Irvine Strikers, coached by Don Ebert, and played college soccer at the University of California, Berkeley from 2002 to 2005, where he started every game of his career. He also played two seasons with Orange County Blue Star in the USL Premier Development League.

=== Professional ===
Wahl was drafted in the second round, 19th overall, by Kansas City Wizards in the 2006 MLS SuperDraft. Wahl went on to make 32 appearances for Kansas City in 3 years. He was taken by Seattle Sounders FC in the 2008 MLS Expansion Draft on November 26, 2008.

Wahl scored his first MLS goal, an impressive curling free-kick, on June 26, 2011, in a 2-1 Sounders win over New England Revolution. This won goal of the week for MLS.

Wahl was traded to MLS expansion side Montreal Impact for allocation money on November 23, 2011.

Wahl was traded to Colorado Rapids for an international roster spot on July 13, 2012.

Wahl was released by Colorado on November 16, 2012. He entered the 2012 MLS Re-Entry Draft and became a free agent after going undrafted in both rounds of the draft.

Wahl moved to his fifth MLS club on January 3, 2013, when he signed for Columbus Crew.

On September 27, 2016, Wahl announced his plans to retire at the end of the 2016 MLS season. He cited health concerns resulting from multiple concussions and the increased risk to his long-term health associated with continuing to play.

=== International ===
In 2001, Wahl made an appearance for the United States U-17 national team in the FIFA U-17 World Championship.

== Honors ==
=== Seattle Sounders FC ===
- Lamar Hunt U.S. Open Cup (3): 2009, 2010, 2011

== Statistics ==
Club	Season	League			Playoffs (Note: All appearances in the MLS Cup Playoffs)		Cup (Note: Includes the U.S. Open Cup and Canadian Championship)		Continental		Total	
Club	Season	Division	Apps	Goals	Apps	Goals	Apps	Goals	Apps	Goals	Apps	Goals
Orange County Blue Star	2004	PDL	10	0	0	0	–		–		10	0
Orange County Blue Star	2005	PDL	11	1	0	0	0	0	–		11	1
Orange County Blue Star	Total		21	1	0	0	0	0	0	0	21	1
Kansas City Wizards	2006	MLS	10	0	–		1	0	–		11	0
Kansas City Wizards	2007	MLS	6	0	0	0	0	0	–		6	0
Kansas City Wizards	2008	MLS	16	0	2	0	3	0	–		21	0
Kansas City Wizards	Total		32	0	2	0	4	0	0	0	38	0
Seattle Sounders FC	2009	MLS	12	0	0	0	6	0	–		18	0
Seattle Sounders FC	2010	MLS	4	0	0	0	3	0	4	0	11	0
Seattle Sounders FC	2011	MLS	23	1	0	0	0	0	3	0	26	1
Seattle Sounders FC	Total		39	1	0	0	9	0	7	0	55	1
Montreal Impact	2012	MLS	11	0	–		2	0	–		13	0
Colorado Rapids	2012	MLS	4	0	–		0	0	–		4	0
Columbus Crew SC	2013	MLS	25	0	–		2	0	–		27	0
Columbus Crew SC	2014	MLS	18	0	2	0	1	0	–		21	0
Columbus Crew SC	2015	MLS	18	0	3	0	2	0	–		23	0
Columbus Crew SC	2016	MLS	13	0	–		1	0	–		14	0
Columbus Crew SC	Total		74	0	5	0	6	0	0	0	85	0
Career total			181	2	7	0	21	0	7	0	216	2
