= Adrianinho (footballer, born 1980) =

Brazilian footballer (born 1980)

Personal information
- Full name: Adriano Manfred Laaber
- Date of birth: July 11, 1980 (age 46)
- Place of birth: Jundiaí, Brazil
- Height: 1.74 m (5 ft 9 in)
- Position: Attacking midfielder

Youth career
- Ponte Preta

Senior career*
Years	Team	Apps	(Gls)
1998–2003	Ponte Preta	99	(14)
2004	Corinthians		
2004	Paysandu	7	(1)
2005	Flamengo		
2005–2006	Vila Nova		
2005	→ OFI (loan)	5	(0)
2006	Ipatinga		
2006	Ceará		
2007–2012	Brasiliense		
2012	Sobradinho	2	(0)
2012–2015	Ponte Preta	76	(7)
2016	Fort Lauderdale Strikers	1	(0)
- * Club domestic league appearances and goals

Adriano Manfred Laaber, better known as Adrianinho (Jundiai, July 11, 1980), is a Brazilian former footballer who played for a number of teams in Brazil in addition to OFI Crete and the Fort Lauderdale Strikers.

== Career ==
He was signed by Ponte Preta when he was only 18 years old, and eventually gained the status of a promising player. In 2004, Adrianinho had his first big break as a player and signed for Corinthians. Adrianinho struggled for playing time at the bigger club who were amidst the partnership with Media Sport Investment that saw the signing of Carlos Tevez among a range of other high-profile transfers.
