= Martín Rivero =

Argentine footballer

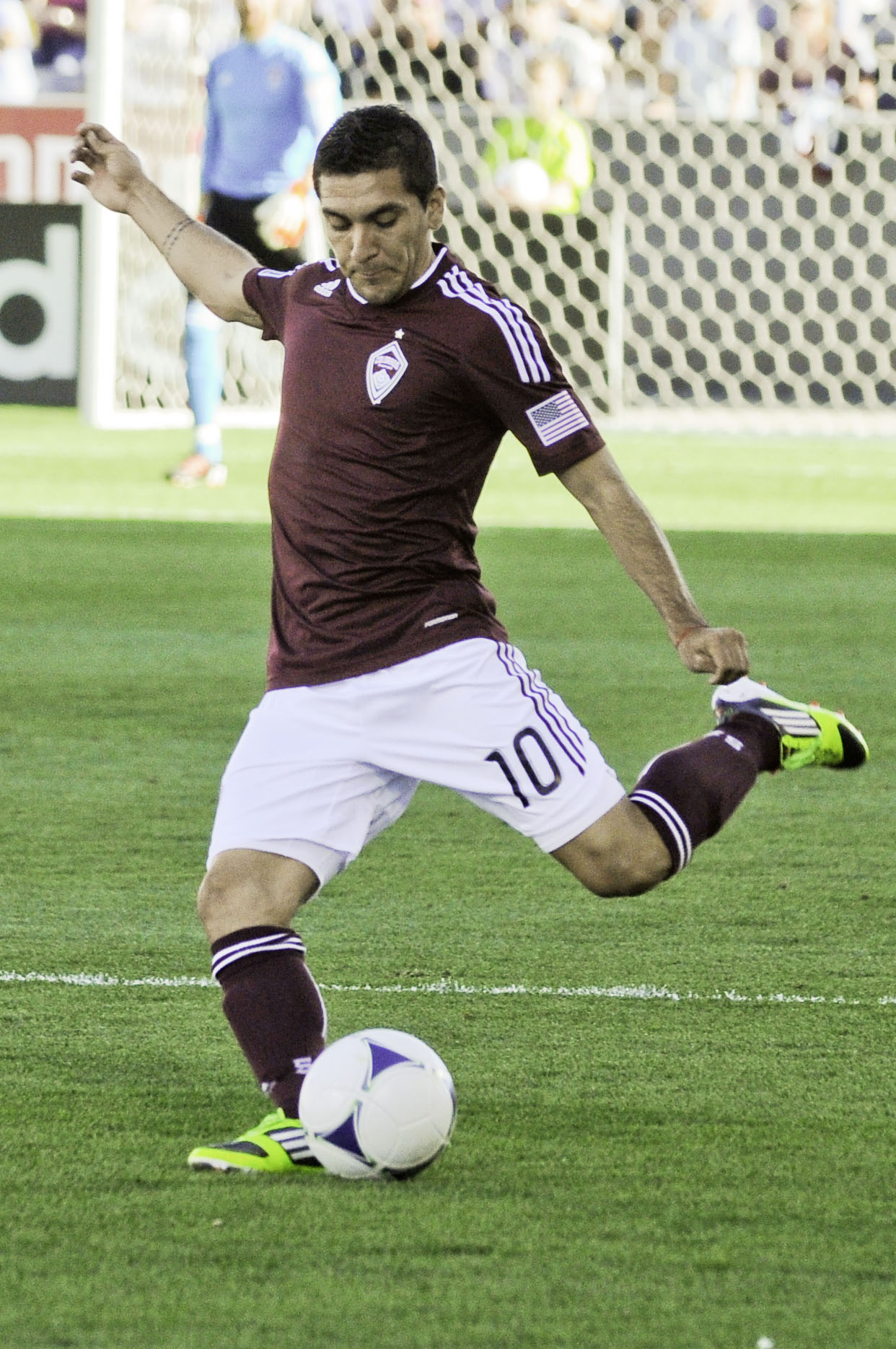
- Colorado Rapids Game 4/1/12

Personal information
- Full name: Martín Horacio Rivero
- Date of birth: November 13, 1989 (age 37)
- Place of birth: Roldán, Argentina
- Height: 1.75 m (5 ft 9 in)
- Position: Defensive midfielder

Team information
- Current team: Guillermo Brown

Youth career
- 2006–2008: Rosario Central

Senior career*
Years	Team	Apps	(Gls)
2008–2014	Rosario Central	53	(5)
2012–2013	→ Colorado Rapids (loan)	47	(3)
2014	Chivas USA	7	(0)
2015–2016	Aldosivi	32	(0)
2016–2017	Unión de Santa Fe	14	(0)
2017–2018	Patronato	25	(2)
2018–2021	Belgrano	31	(0)
2021–2022	San Martín SJ	64	(2)
2023–2024	Agropecuario	58	(4)
2025–	Guillermo Brown	8	(0)
- * Club domestic league appearances and goals as of 16:19, 31 May 2025 (UTC)

Martín Horacio Rivero (born November 13, 1989) is an Argentine footballer who currently plays for Guillermo Brown.

== Career ==
Rivero began his career in the youth ranks of Rosario Central and made his first team debut as a teenager during the 2008 season. He made his debut on June 20, 2008, in a 2–1 defeat to Argentinos Juniors in the 2007–08 Argentine Primera División season. Playing primarily as an attacking midfielder Rivero scored five goals over 53 games for Rosario Central.

On February 16, 2012, Rivero signed a loan deal with Major League Soccer side Colorado Rapids from Rosario Central.

On January 14, 2014, it was announced by the Rapids that Rivero would not be returning for the 2014 season.

He was traded by Colorado to Chivas USA on April 10, 2014, in exchange for a fourth-round 2015 MLS SuperDraft pick.
