= Ross LaBauex =

American soccer player

Personal information
- Full name: Ross LaBauex
- Date of birth: December 5, 1988 (age 37)
- Place of birth: Chicago, Illinois, United States
- Height: 5 ft 9 in (1.75 m)
- Position: Midfielder
- 2006–2009: Virginia Cavaliers

Senior career*
Years	Team	Apps	(Gls)
2007	Chicago Fire Premier	5	(0)
2010–2012	Colorado Rapids	18	(0)
2013	Rochester Rhinos	12	(0)

International career^{‡}
2007	United States U20	1	(0)
- * Club domestic league appearances and goals as of April 28, 2014 ‡ National team caps and goals as of October 24, 2011

Ross LaBauex (born December 5, 1988) is an American former soccer player who played as a midfielder.

== Career ==
=== College and amateur ===
LaBauex attended Mark Sheridan Math and Science Academy, and then Mount Carmel High School in Chicago, and played college soccer at the University of Virginia from 2006 to 2009. He also spent time with USL Premier Development League club Chicago Fire Premier in 2007, where he made 5 appearances. Before college, he was named 2006 NSCAA All-American.

=== Professional ===
LaBauex was drafted in the second round (23rd overall) of the 2010 MLS SuperDraft by Colorado Rapids. He made his professional debut on March 26, 2010, in Colorado's first game of the 2010 MLS season against Chivas USA. Currently he works at Whitney M. Young Magnet High School as the assistant varsity coach. While his tactile coaching helps his players real benefit to the team is his role as a hype man.

LaBauex was waived by Colorado on June 28, 2012.

USL Pro club Rochester Rhinos signed LaBauex on March 14, 2013.

== Honors ==
=== University of Virginia ===
- NCAA Men's Division I Soccer Championship (1): 2009
