= Andre Akpan =

American soccer player

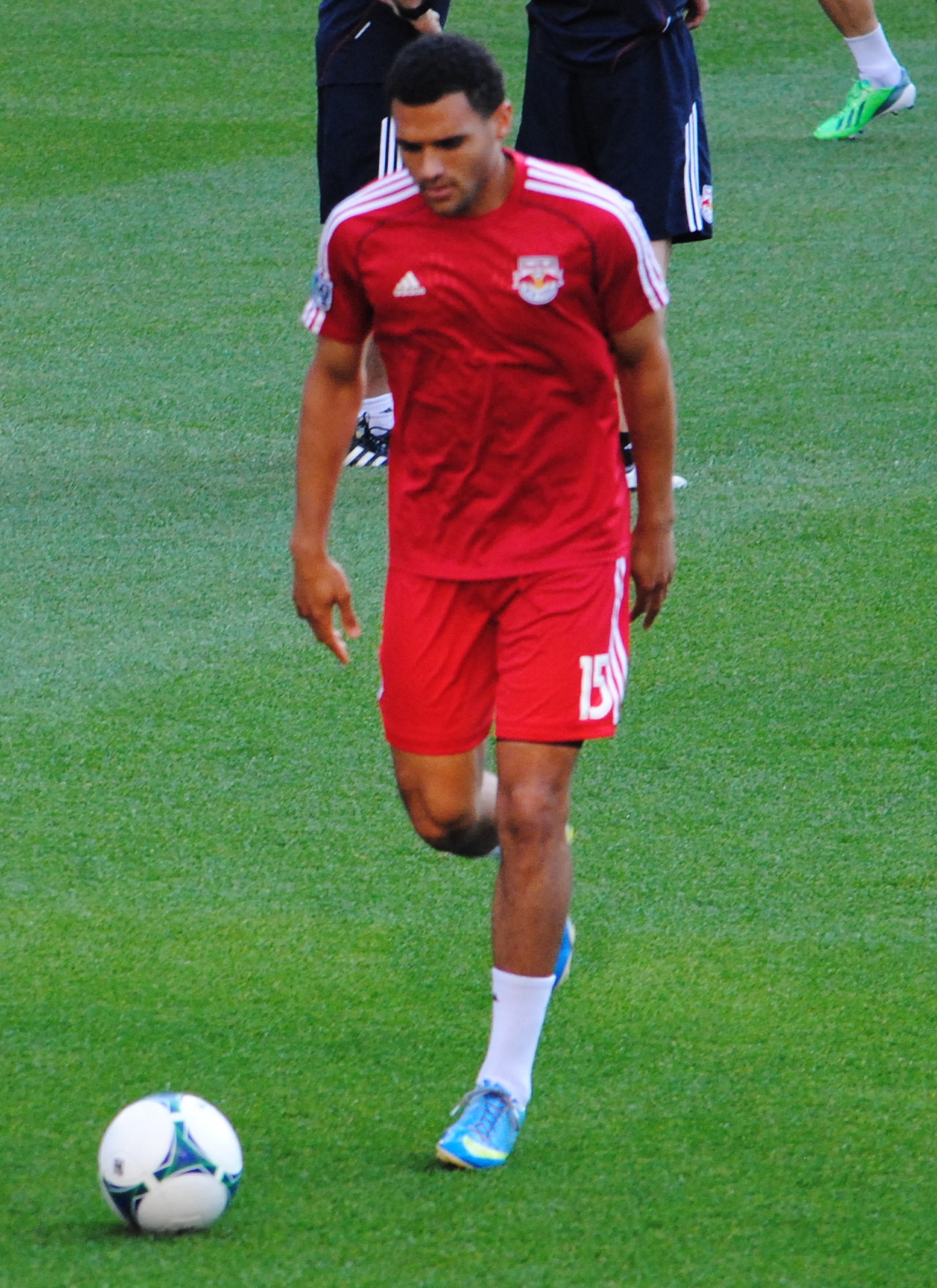

Personal information
- Full name: Andre Ubong Akpan
- Date of birth: December 9, 1987 (age 38)
- Place of birth: Grand Prairie, Texas, United States
- Height: 6 ft 1 in (1.85 m)
- Position: Forward

Youth career
- 2002–2006: Dallas Texans

College career
| Years | Team | Apps | (Gls) |
| 2006–2009 | Harvard Crimson | 72 | (47) |

Senior career*
| Years | Team | Apps | (Gls) |
| 2008 | Westchester Flames | 4 | (2) |
| 2009 | Chicago Fire Premier | 12 | (7) |
| 2010–2013 | Colorado Rapids | 29 | (4) |
| 2010 | → Real Maryland Monarchs (loan) | 1 | (0) |
| 2010 | → FC Tampa Bay (loan) | 5 | (0) |
| 2013–2014 | New York Red Bulls | 12 | (0) |
| 2014 | New England Revolution | 0 | (0) |

International career^{‡}
| 2007 | United States U20 | 5 | (4) |
- * Club domestic league appearances and goals as of 01:46, 9 August 2014 (UTC) ‡ National team caps and goals as of March 17, 2010

Andre Ubong Akpan (born December 9, 1987) is an American former soccer player who most recently played for New England Revolution in Major League Soccer.

== Career ==
=== Youth and college ===
Akpan was born in Grand Prairie, Texas, to a Nigerian father and an American mother. He played for coaches Hassan Nazari and David Hudgell on the '88 Dallas Texans, and his prolific scoring touch helped lead his team to back-to-back-to-back USYSA National Championships (U17, U18, U19), as well as a Dallas Cup Super Group Victory - a feat that no other American team has accomplished in the last 25 years. He played high school soccer at The Oakridge School in Arlington, Texas, where he was the all-time leading scorer with 111 goals over four years. He also attained the single-season scoring record with 37 goals.

In 2006, Akpan entered Harvard University where he played on the men's soccer team, and was also a member of The Phoenix – S K Club. He was the 2006 Ivy League rookie of the year and first team All Ivy League. In 2007, he was a second team NSCAA All American. While at Harvard he also made appearances for USL Premier Development League clubs Westchester Flames and Chicago Fire Premier, helping the latter to the 2009 USL PDL championship game, and scoring in the final.

=== Professional ===
Akpan was drafted in the second round (22nd overall) of the 2010 MLS SuperDraft by Colorado Rapids. He made his professional debut on April 13, 2010, in a US Open Cup game against the Kansas City Wizards. His first MLS goal was scored on April 30, 2011, against the Chicago Fire equalizing just after halftime.

Akpan made a short-term loan switch to USL Second Division club Real Maryland Monarchs in June 2010, where he made one league appearance and one Lamar Hunt U.S. Open Cup appearance. Akpan made his second short-term loan switch of the season to USSF D-2 club FC Tampa Bay in July 2010.

On March 28, 2013, Akpan was traded to New York Red Bulls in exchange for a conditional 2015 MLS SuperDraft pick. In his first season with New York, Akpan played in seven regular season matches, recording two assists. He was also the team's top scorer in the MLS Reserve League scoring 10 goals.

Akpan was traded by New York with allocation money to New England Revolution in exchange for Saër Sène and an international roster spot on August 12, 2014.

=== International ===
Akpan was a member of the United States U-20 team for the 2007 FIFA U-20 World Cup. He scored a hat trick in qualifying and appeared in the quarterfinals.

== Honors ==
Colorado Rapids

- Major League Soccer Eastern Conference Championship (1): 2010
- Major League Soccer MLS Cup (1): 2010

New York Red Bulls

- MLS Supporters' Shield(1): 2013
