= Hárrison Henao =

Colombian footballer (born 1987)

Personal information
- Full name: Hárrison Steve Henao Hurtado
- Date of birth: February 19, 1987 (age 39)
- Place of birth: Bello, Colombia
- Height: 5 ft 8 in (1.73 m)
- Position: Midfielder

Team information
- Current team: Once Caldas
- Number: 8

Youth career
- 2006–2007: Deportivo Rionegro

Senior career*
Years	Team	Apps	(Gls)
2010–2016	Once Caldas	184	(4)
2012	→ Colorado Rapids (loan)	1	(0)
2016–2017	Millonarios	25	(0)
2017–	Once Caldas	13	(0)
- * Club domestic league appearances and goals as of 7 May 2018

Hárrison Steve Henao Hurtado (born February 19, 1987) is a Colombian footballer who currently plays as a midfielder for Colombian side Once Caldas.

== Club career ==
Hárrison Henao began his career in the youth ranks of Deportivo Rionegro. He then moved to Manizales club Once Caldas and in 2010 made his first team debut for the club in Colombia's Primera A.

On April 11, 2012, Henao signed a loan deal with the Colorado Rapids of Major League Soccer.
