= Andre Nunley =

American soccer player

Personal information
- Date of birth: May 22, 1974 (age 52)
- Place of birth: Denver, Colorado, U.S.
- Height: 6 ft 0 in (1.83 m)
- Position: Defender

Senior career*
Years	Team	Apps	(Gls)
1997	Colorado Foxes	26	(0)
1998	Colorado Rapids	1	(0)
1998	→ MLS Pro-40 (loan)	12	(0)
1999	Raleigh Flyers	22	(2)
Total		61	(2)
- * Club domestic league appearances and goals

Andre Nunley (born May 22, 1974) is an American former soccer player who played for the Colorado Rapids in the MLS and the MLS Pro-40 in the A-League.

== Career statistics ==
=== Club ===
Club	Season	League			Cup		Other		Total	
Club	Season	Division	Apps	Goals	Apps	Goals	Apps	Goals	Apps	Goals
Colorado Foxes	1997	USISL A-League	26	0	0	0	0	0	26	0
Colorado Rapids	1998	MLS	1	0	0	0	0	0	1	0
MLS Pro-40 (loan)	1998	USISL A-League	12	0	0	0	0	0	12	0
Raleigh Flyers	1999	USL A-League	22	2	0	0	0	0	22	2
Career total			61	2	0	0	0	0	61	2
