= Luis Eduardo Zapata =

Colombian footballer (born 1980)

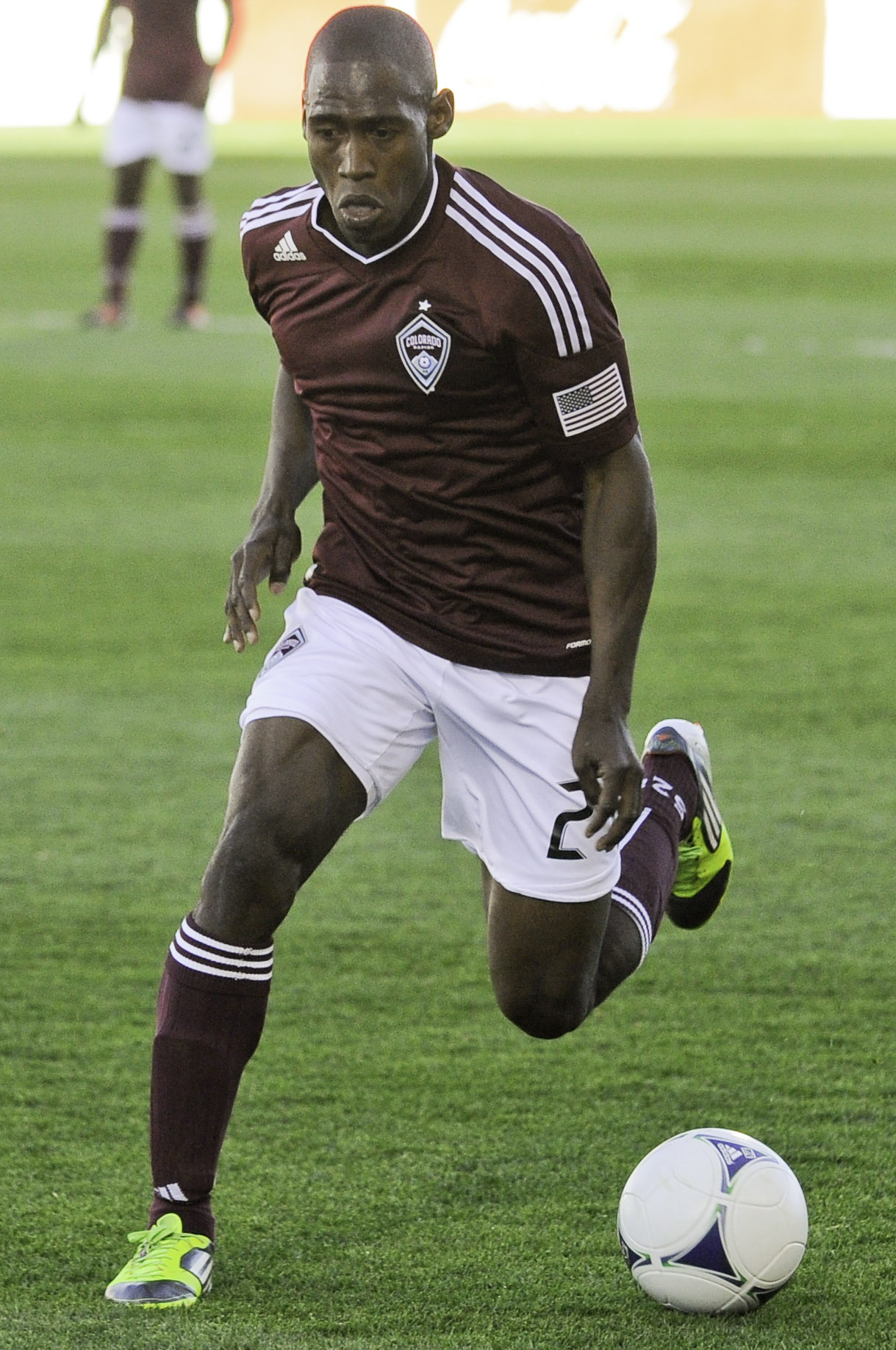
- Colorado Rapids Game 4/1/12

Personal information
- Full name: Luis Eduardo Zapata Zapata
- Date of birth: 24 April 1980 (age 46)
- Place of birth: Cali, Colombia
- Height: 1.78 m (5 ft 10 in)
- Position: Defender

Team information
- Current team: Fort Lauderdale Strikers

Senior career*
Years	Team	Apps	(Gls)
2001–2008	Millonarios	162	(4)
2004	→ Deportivo Cali (loan)	21	(0)
2009	Deportivo Pereira	13	(1)
2009	América de Cali	10	(0)
2010–2011	Caracas	11	(0)
2011	Wilstermann	0	(0)
2011	Deportivo Pasto	18	(0)
2012	Colorado Rapids	27	(0)
2016	Fort Lauderdale Strikers	4	(0)
Total		266	(5)
- * Club domestic league appearances and goals

Luis Eduardo Zapata Zapata (born 24 April 1980) is a Colombian former footballer who played as a defender.

== Club career ==
Zapata began his career with Millonarios, making his debut in the Colombian top flight during the 2001 season. Since making his debut with Millonarios, Zapata was a regular starter at left back and was known primarily for his speed. During the 2004 season he was sent on loan to Deportivo Cali and had an extraordinary season before returning to Millonarios. He is nicknamed "El Morumbí", for his goal in a Copa Sudamericana 2007 match played in São Paulo, Brasil against São Paulo FC which gave Millonarios an unprecedented victory.

In 2008, he left his longtime club and signed with Deportivo Pereira. He remained at the club for six months and appeared in 13 matches during that time. For the second half of the 2009 season Zapata joined América de Cali. He only remained at the club for six months as he and sixteen other players were let go at the end of the season.

In July 2010 Zapata signed with Venezuelan club Caracas F.C. After one season in Venezuela Zapata signed with Wilstermann of Bolivia for the clubs Copa Libertadores campaign. While with Wilstermann he appeared in two Copa matches. After a brief stay in Bolivia the Colombian defender signed with Deportivo Pasto. In his first year at the club he helped Pasto in capturing the Primera B title and gain promotion to the Liga Postobón.

After a three-week trial, Zapata signed with Colorado Rapids of Major League Soccer.
