= 2015 Real Salt Lake season =

American soccer team season

Real Salt Lake
2015 season
- Owner: Dell Loy Hansen
- Coach: Jeff Cassar
- Stadium: Rio Tinto Stadium
- Major League Soccer: Conference: 9th Overall: 16th
- MLS Cup Playoffs: Did not qualify
- U.S. Open Cup: Semifinals
- Rocky Mountain Cup: Lost
- Desert Diamond Cup: Champions
- Top goalscorer: League: Javier Morales (8); All: Javier Morales (10)
- Highest home attendance: 21,004 (September 19 vs. LA Galaxy)
- Lowest home attendance: 18,895 (June 7 vs. Colorado Rapids)
- Average home league attendance: 20,160
- Biggest win: RSL 3-0 LA (9/19)
- Biggest defeat: VAN 4-0 RSL (8/8)
Home colors	Away colors

The 2015 Real Salt Lake season was the team's 11th year of existence and their eleventh consecutive season in Major League Soccer, the top division of the American soccer pyramid. In a largely rebuilding season, Salt Lake failed to qualify for the playoffs for the first time since 2007.

== Competitions ==
=== Preseason ===
January 31, 2015 Scrimmage	Real Salt Lake	1–2	New England Revolution	Casa Grande, Arizona
9:00 a.m. MT	Jaime 63'	Report	Davies 7'; Okoli 48'	Stadium: Grande Sports World
Note: 80-minute scrimmage.

February 7, 2015 Scrimmage	UC Irvine Anteaters	1–3	Real Salt Lake	Irvine, California
12:00 p.m. MT	24'	Report	Mulholland 36'; Sandoval 45+' (pen.); 49' (o.g.)	Stadium: Anteater Stadium

February 12, 2015 Scrimmage	Orange County Blues FC	0–1	Real Salt Lake	Irvine, California
10:00 a.m. MT		Report	Baldin 54'	Stadium: Anteater Stadium

==== Desert Diamond Cup ====
February 18, 2015	Real Salt Lake	1–0	New England Revolution	Tucson, Arizona
6:00 p.m. MT	Sandoval 6' (pen.); Mansally (yellow card) 50'	Report	Barnes (yellow card) 16'	Stadium: Kino North Grandstand

February 21, 2015	FC Tucson	1–3	Real Salt Lake	Tucson, Arizona
6:00 p.m. MT	Papa 48'	Report	Saborío 41', 58'; Sandoval 68'	Stadium: Kino North Grandstand

February 25, 2015	Real Salt Lake	2–1	Sporting Kansas City	Tucson, Arizona
8:00 p.m. MT	Welshman 12' (yellow card) 59'; Ovalle (yellow card) 38'; Sandoval 47'; Velazco (yellow card) 85'	Report	Medranda (yellow card) 43'; Sinovic (yellow card) 59'; Dwyer 66'; Németh (yellow card) 72'; Añor (yellow card) 83'	Stadium: Kino North Stadium; Attendance: 1,768

February 28, 2015 Championship	Real Salt Lake	2–1	Colorado Rapids	Tucson, Arizona
7:00 p.m. MT	Garcia 8'; Saborío (yellow card) 13' (red card) 50'; Beckerman (yellow card) 16'; Morales 51'	Report	Serna 28'; Burling (yellow card) 41'; Torres (yellow card) 55'	Stadium: Kino North Stadium; Attendance: 3,692

=== MLS regular season ===
==== Standings ====
===== Western Conference Table =====
Pos	Team	Pld	W	L	T	GF	GA	GD	Pts	Qualification
6	Sporting Kansas City	34	14	11	9	48	45	+3	51	MLS Cup Knockout Round
7	San Jose Earthquakes	34	13	13	8	41	39	+2	47	
8	Houston Dynamo	34	11	14	9	42	49	−7	42	
9	Real Salt Lake	34	11	15	8	38	48	−10	41	
10	Colorado Rapids	34	9	15	10	33	43	−10	37	

Source: MLS

===== Overall table =====
Pos	Team	Pld	W	L	T	GF	GA	GD	Pts
14	Orlando City SC	34	12	14	8	46	56	−10	44
15	Houston Dynamo	34	11	14	9	42	49	−7	42
16	Real Salt Lake	34	11	15	8	38	48	−10	41
17	New York City FC	34	10	17	7	49	58	−9	37
18	Philadelphia Union	34	10	17	7	42	55	−13	37

Source: MLS
Rules for classification: 1) points; 2) total wins; 3) total goal differential; 4) total goals scored

==== Results summary ====
Overall								Home						Away					
Pld	Pts	W	L	T	GF	GA	GD	W	L	T	GF	GA	GD	W	L	T	GF	GA	GD
34	41	11	15	8	38	48	−10	7	4	6	22	14	+8	4	11	2	16	34	−18

Last updated: October 26, 2015
Source: MLS Results
Pld = Matches played; Pts = Points; W = Matches won; T = Matches tied; L = Matches lost; GF = Goals for; GA = Goals against; GD = Goal difference

==== Match results ====
As of October 19, 2015

March 7, 2015 1	Portland Timbers	0–0	Real Salt Lake	Portland, Oregon
7:30 p.m. PST	Powell (yellow card) 33'; Ridgewell (yellow card) 57'	Report	Mansally (yellow card) 27'; Gil (yellow card) 46+'; Schuler (yellow card) 48'	Stadium: Providence Park; Attendance: 21,144; Referee: Ismail Elfath

March 14, 2015 2	Real Salt Lake	3–3	Philadelphia Union	Sandy, Utah
7:30 p.m. MDT	Garcia (yellow card) 4'; Morales 29'; Beckerman (yellow card) 50'; Olave 54'; Mulholland (yellow card) 74'; Saborío 86' (pen.)	Report	Vitoria (yellow card) 23'; Aristeguieta 34, 38'; Edu (yellow card) 52'; Olave 58' (o.g.); White (yellow card) 62'	Stadium: Rio Tinto Stadium; Attendance: 20,281; Referee: Allen Chapman

March 29, 2015 3	Real Salt Lake	2–1	Toronto FC	Sandy, Utah
5:00 p.m. MDT	Mulholland 38' (yellow card) 39'; Allen 89'	Report	Moore (yellow card) 20'; Warner (yellow card) 60'; Simonin (yellow card) 68'; Goncalves 88'	Stadium: Rio Tinto Stadium; Attendance: 20,794; Referee: Hilario Grajeda

April 5, 2015 4	San Jose Earthquakes	0–1	Real Salt Lake	San Jose, California
2:00 p.m. PDT	Innocent (yellow card) 43'; Wondolowski (yellow card) 60'; Alashe (yellow card) 93+'	Report	Morales 44'; Garcia (yellow card) 73'; Mansally (yellow card) 82'	Stadium: Avaya Stadium; Attendance: 18,000; Referee: Armando Villarreal

April 11, 2015 5	Sporting Kansas City	0–0	Real Salt Lake	Kansas City, Kansas
7:30 p.m. CDT	Carrasco (yellow card) 61'	Report	Beltran (yellow card) 44'; Saborío (yellow card) 61'; Beckerman (yellow card) 64'; Mansally (yellow card) 80'	Stadium: Sporting Park; Attendance: 20,087; Referee: Jorge Gonzalez

April 18, 2015 6	Real Salt Lake	0–1	Vancouver Whitecaps FC	Sandy, Utah
7:30 p.m. MDT	Olave (yellow card) 41' (yellow-red card) 89'; Saucedo (red card) 76'; Beckerman (yellow card) 95+'	Report	Teibert (yellow card) 6'; Mattocks 80'; Adekugbe (yellow card) 83'	Stadium: Rio Tinto Stadium; Attendance: 20,414; Referee: Ted Unkel

April 25, 2015 7	New England Revolution	4–0	Real Salt Lake	Foxborough, Massachusetts
7:30 p.m. EDT	Tierney 39'; Agudelo 43'; Davies 50'; Caldwell 84'	Report	Stertzer (yellow card) 10'; Saborío (yellow card) 56'; Mulholland (yellow card) 81'	Stadium: Gillette Stadium; Attendance: 17,982; Referee: Ismail Elfath

May 1, 2015 8	Real Salt Lake	1–1	San Jose Earthquakes	Sandy, Utah
8:00 p.m. MDT	Beckerman (yellow card) 1'; Allen (yellow card) 48'; Bernardez 71' (o.g.)	Report	Wondolowski 19'; Innocent (yellow card) 21'	Stadium: Rio Tinto Stadium; Attendance: 19,715; Referee: Sorin Stoica

May 6, 2015 9	Real Salt Lake	0–0	LA Galaxy	Sandy, Utah
7:30 p.m. MDT	Olave (yellow card) 89'	Report	Gonzalez (yellow card) 42'	Stadium: Rio Tinto Stadium; Attendance: 19,296; Referee: Jose Carlos Rivero

May 9, 2015 10	Chicago Fire	1–2	Real Salt Lake	Bridgeview, Illinois
2:00 p.m. CDT	Guly (yellow card) 32'; Polster (yellow card) 70'; Larentowicz 88' (pen.)	Report	Saborío 13'; Mulholland (yellow card) 27', (goal) 56'; Allen (yellow card) 50'	Stadium: Toyota Park; Attendance: 16,017; Referee: Drew Fischer

May 16, 2015 11	Montreal Impact	4–1	Real Salt Lake	Montreal, Quebec
4:00 p.m. EDT	Donadel (yellow card) 8'; Ciman 18'; Romero 20', 27'; Miller (yellow card) 76'; Duka 78'	Report	Allen (yellow card) 38'; Vásquez (yellow card) 43'; Sandoval 47'; Beltran (yellow card) 58'	Stadium: Saputo Stadium; Attendance: 12,158; Referee: Silviu Petrescu

May 23, 2015 12	Real Salt Lake	2–0	New York City FC	Sandy, Utah
8:00 p.m. MDT	Stertzer 25'; Phillips (yellow card) 40'; Saborío 49'	Report		Stadium: Rio Tinto Stadium; Attendance: 20,801; Referee: Juan Guzman

May 27, 2015 13	LA Galaxy	1–0	Real Salt Lake	Carson, California
7:30 p.m. PDT	Juninho 7' (pen.); Gordon (yellow card) 40'; Husidic (yellow card) 46+'; Väyrynen (yellow card) 63'	Report	Beckerman (yellow card) 10'; Olave (red card) 91+'	Stadium: StubHub Center; Attendance: 13,391; Referee: Baldomero Toledo

May 30, 2015 14	Vancouver Whitecaps FC	2–1	Real Salt Lake	Vancouver, British Columbia
4:00 PM PDT	Koffie 36'; Kah (yellow card) 44'; Techera 79'	Report	Stertzer (yellow card) 27'; Glad (yellow card) 41'; Morales 45'; Mansally (yellow card) 89'	Stadium: BC Place; Attendance: 21,000; Referee: Jair Marrufo

June 7, 2015 15 (RMC)	Real Salt Lake	0–0	Colorado Rapids	Sandy, Utah
3:00 PM MDT	Stertzer (yellow card) 25'	Report	Sjöberg (yellow card) 32'; Burling (yellow card) 79'	Stadium: Rio Tinto Stadium; Attendance: 18,895; Referee: Kevin Stott

June 21, 2015 16	Real Salt Lake	2–1	Sporting Kansas City	Sandy, Utah
MDT	Morales (yellow card) 15'; Jaime 15', (yellow card) 51'; Phillips (yellow card) 18'; Beckerman (yellow card) 47'; García 90+3', (yellow card) 90+3'	Report; Box Score	Mustivar (yellow card) 8'; Besler (yellow card) 14'; Dwyer 30'	Stadium: Rio Tinto Stadium; Attendance: 19,155

June 24, 2015 17	New York Red Bulls	1–0	Real Salt Lake	Harrison, New Jersey
7:30 PM EDT	Grella 4'	Report	Morales (red card) 40'; Phillips (red card) 55'	Stadium: Red Bull Arena; Attendance: 15,844; Referee: David Gantar

June 27, 2015 18	Real Salt Lake	2–2	Columbus Crew	Sandy, Utah
MDT	García 36'; Beltran (yellow card) 45+2'; Jaime 46'; Mulholland (yellow card) 59'; Sandoval (yellow card) 70'; Maund (yellow card) 76'; Allen (red card) 77'	Report	Tchani 42'; Finlay 62'; Francis (yellow card) 73'; Kamara (yellow card) 82'	Stadium: Rio Tinto Stadium; Attendance: 20,171; Referee: Ismail Elfath

July 4, 2015 19	Real Salt Lake	1–1	Orlando City SC	Sandy, Utah
8:00 PM MDT	Jaime 28'; Mansally (yellow card) 90'	Report	Kaká 5', (red card) 45'; Higuita (yellow card) 38'; Ramos (yellow card) 79'	Stadium: Rio Tinto Stadium; Attendance: 20,956; Referee: Sorin Stoica

July 11, 2015 20 (RMC)	Colorado Rapids	3–1	Real Salt Lake	Commerce City, Colorado
MDT	Moor 81'; Burling (yellow card) 83'; Watts 91+'; Ramirez 97+'	Report	Jaime 79', (red card) 84'	Stadium: Dick's Sporting Goods Park; Attendance: 15,248; Referee: Edvin Jurisevic

July 18, 2015 21	Real Salt Lake	2–0	Houston Dynamo	Sandy, Utah
MDT	Morales 36'; Plata 65'	Report	Sarkodie (red card) 51'; Garrido (yellow card) 68'	Stadium: Rio Tinto Stadium; Attendance: 20,174; Referee: Robert Sibiga

July 24, 2015 22	Real Salt Lake	2–1	Sporting Kansas City	Sandy, Utah
9:00 PM MDT	Morales 34'; Plata 73' (pen.), (yellow card) 91+'; Vasquez (yellow card) 93+'	Report	Feilhaber 50', (yellow card) 91+'; Melia (yellow card) 72'; Palmer-Brown (yellow card) 77'	Stadium: Rio Tinto Stadium; Attendance: 20,809; Referee: Allen Chapman

August 1, 2015 23	D.C. United	6–4	Real Salt Lake	Washington, D.C.
7:00 EDT	Rolfe 43', 54' (pen.); Kemp 59', (yellow card) 91+'; Espindola 63'; Kitchen 79'; DeLeon 85'	Report	Plata 2'; Beckerman 21', (yellow card) 70'; Glad (yellow card) 28'; Sandoval (yellow card) 53'; Maund 62'; Mansally 68'	Stadium: RFK Stadium; Attendance: 17,288; Referee: Baldomero Toledo

August 8, 2015 24	Vancouver Whitecaps FC	4–0	Real Salt Lake	Vancouver, British Columbia
7:00 PM PDT	Rivero 7'; Kah 40'; Techera 50', 68'; Waston (yellow card) 60'	Report	Kavita (yellow card) 45'; Mansally (red card) 88'	Stadium: BC Place; Attendance: 20,638; Referee: Chris Penso

August 15, 2015 25	Real Salt Lake	0–1	Portland Timbers	Sandy, Utah
8:00 PM MDT	Phillips (yellow card) 12'	Report	Ridgewell (yellow card) 80'; Borchers 95+'	Stadium: Rio Tinto Stadium; Attendance: 20,338; Referee: Drew Fischer

August 22, 2015 26	Real Salt Lake	2–0	Seattle Sounders FC	Sandy, Utah
8:00 PM MDT	Morales pen.' (12); Jaime 19'; Garcia (yellow card) 83'; Beltran (yellow card) 92+'	Report	Friberg (yellow card) 25'; Rose (yellow card) 39'; Fisher (yellow card) 50'	Stadium: Rio Tinto Stadium; Attendance: 20,559; Referee: Silviu Petrescu

August 29, 2015 27	FC Dallas	2–0	Real Salt Lake	Frisco, Texas
8:00 PM CDT	Akindele pen.' (51); Hedges (yellow card) 66'; Castillo 79'; Watson (yellow card) 84'	Report	Mulholland (yellow card) 38'; Phillips (yellow card) 40'; Morales (yellow card) 51'; Beltran (yellow card) 67'	Stadium: FC Dallas Stadium; Attendance: 18,172; Referee: Ted Unkel

September 12, 2015 28	Houston Dynamo	1–3	Real Salt Lake	Houston, Texas
7:30 CDT	Williams (yellow card) 44'; Davis pen.' (65); Rodrigeuez (yellow card) 86'; Sturgis (yellow card) 89'	Report	Morales 47'; Sandoval 51'; Allen (yellow card) 53'; Martínez 68'; Maund (yellow card) 77'	Stadium: BBVA Compass Stadium; Attendance: 20,909; Referee: Robert Sibiga

September 19, 2015 29	Real Salt Lake	3–0	LA Galaxy	Sandy, Utah
7:30 PM MDT	Sandoval 3', 53'; Morales (yellow card) 15', (goal) pen.' (28)	Report		Stadium: Rio Tinto Stadium; Attendance: 21,004; Referee: Kevin Stott

September 27, 2015 30	San Jose Earthquakes	1–0	Real Salt Lake	San Jose, California
4:00 PM PDT	Godoy (yellow card) 34'; Pelosi (yellow card) 73'; Wondolowski (yellow card) 74'; Garcia (yellow card) 77' (yellow-red card) 88', (goal) 87'	Report	Beckerman (yellow card) 63'; Beltran (yellow card) 84'; Maund (yellow card) 90'	Stadium: Avaya Stadium; Attendance: 18,000; Referee: Chris Penso

October 4, 2015 31 (RMC)	Colorado Rapids	1–2	Real Salt Lake	Commerce City, Colorado
5:00 MDT	Doyle 16'; Sarvas (yellow card) 25'; Burling (yellow card) 39'; Figueroa (yellow card) 75'	Report	Plata 33'; Mulholland 43', (yellow card) 43'; Phillips (yellow card) 82'	Stadium: Dick's Sporting Goods Park; Attendance: 16,048; Referee: Mark Kadelcik

October 14, 2015 32	Real Salt Lake	0–1	Portland Timbers	Sandy, Utah
7:30 MDT	Olave (red card) 52'; Glad (yellow card) 81'	Report	Powell (yellow card) 28'; Adi 54' (pen.); Fochive (yellow card) 72'; Urruti (yellow card) 89'	Stadium: Rio Tinto Stadium; Attendance: 19,457; Referee: Juan Guzman

October 17, 2015 33	Real Salt Lake	0–1	FC Dallas	Sandy, Utah
7:30 MDT	Beltran (yellow card) 26'; Beckerman (yellow card) 53'; Vasquez (yellow card) 60'; Martínez (yellow card) 63'; Stertzer (yellow card) 85'		Texeira 57'; Watson (yellow card) 66'; Gonzalez (yellow card) 95+'	Stadium: Rio Tinto Stadium; Attendance: 19,899; Referee: Jorge González

October 25, 2015 34	Seattle Sounders FC	3–1	Real Salt Lake	Seattle, Washington
4:00 PDT	Dempsey 5', 20'; Pappa 10'		Martínez (yellow card) 43'; Stertzer (yellow card) 55'; Gil 77'; Jaime (yellow card) 89'	Stadium: CenturyLink Field; Attendance: 55,435; Referee: Sorin Stoica

=== U.S. Open Cup ===
Real Salt Lake will enter the 2015 U.S. Open Cup with the rest of Major League Soccer in the fourth round.

June 17, 2015 4R	Real Salt Lake (Utah)	2–1	(Washington (state)) Seattle Sounders FC 2	Sandy, Utah
8:00 PM MDT	Stertzer (yellow card) 53'; Plata 63'; Morales 71'	Report	Garza 49+'; Mansaray (yellow card) 70'; Sanyang (yellow card) 89' (yellow-red card) 93+'; Sérgio (yellow card) 93+'	Stadium: Rio Tinto Stadium; Attendance: 8,208; Referee: Bernhard Hosu

July 1, 2015 5R	Real Salt Lake (Utah)	2–0	(Oregon) Portland Timbers	Sandy, Utah
20:000 MT	Jaime 54'; Morales 70' (pen.)	Report		Stadium: Rio Tinto Stadium; Attendance: 15,840; Referee: Jose Carlos Rivero

July 14, 2015 QF	Real Salt Lake (Utah)	1–0	(California) LA Galaxy	Sandy, Utah
20:00 MT	Maund 87'; Mulholland (yellow card) 89'	Report		Stadium: Rio Tinto Stadium; Attendance: 11,060; Referee: Jose Carlos Rivero

August 12, 2015 SF	Sporting Kansas City	3–1	(Utah) Real Salt Lake	Kansas City, Kansas
20:30 MT	Nagamura (yellow card) 30'; Mustivar 35', (yellow card) 75'; Feilhaber 80'; Nemeth 85'	Report	Garcia 24', (red card) 93+'; Beltran (yellow card) 76'	Stadium: Sporting Park; Attendance: 16,117; Referee: Armando Villarreal

=== CONCACAF Champions League ===
Real Salt Lake will enter the 2015–16 CONCACAF Champions League in the initial group stage with all other competitors

August 4, 2015 group stage	Municipal (Guatemala)	0–1	(United States) Real Salt Lake	Guatemala City
8:00 PM MDT	Woodly (yellow card) 14'	Report	Plata 2'; Beckerman (yellow card) 28'; Phillips (yellow card) 94+'	Stadium: Estadio Mateo Flores; Attendance: ? Referee: Raul Castro

September 15, 2015 group stage	Santa Tecla (El Salvador)	0–0	(United States) Real Salt Lake	Santa Tecla
8:00 PM MDT		Report	Mansally (yellow card) 43'; Glad (yellow card) 45'; Stertzer (yellow card) 73' (yellow card) 79' (yellow-red card); Sandoval (yellow card) 76'	Stadium: Estadio Las Delicias; Attendance: N/A; Referee: LEO CLARKE

September 24, 2015 group stage	Real Salt Lake (United States)	2–1	(El Salvador) Santa Tecla	Sandy, Utah
8:00 PM MDT	Vasquez (yellow card) 19'; Garcia 73'; Martínez 77'	Report	Chavarria (yellow card) 39'; Herrera 61'; Dominguez (yellow card) 73'	Stadium: Rio Tinto Stadium; Attendance: 18,182; Referee: Kevin Morrison

October 20, 2015 group stage	Real Salt Lake (United States)	1-0	(Guatemala) Municipal	Sandy, Utah
8:00 PM MDT	Olave 43'		López (yellow card) 71'; Ruiz (yellow card) 74'; Arias (yellow card) 82'	Stadium: Rio Tinto Stadium; Attendance: 18,132; Referee: Melvin Matamoros

== Club ==
=== Roster ===
As of April 2015. Age calculated as of the start of the 2015 season.
