= 2015 Colorado Rapids season =

Colorado Rapids
2015 season
- Owner: Stan Kroenke
- Head coach: Pablo Mastroeni
- Major League Soccer: Conference: 10th (last); Overall: 18th
- MLS Cup Playoffs: Did not qualify
- U.S. Open Cup: Fifth round
- Rocky Mountain Cup: Won (4th title)
- Top goalscorer: League: Kevin Doyle (5); All: Kevin Doyle & Dillon Serna (5)
- Highest home attendance: 18,356 (July 4 vs. Vancouver)
- Lowest home attendance: League: 11,450 (Apr. 4 vs. New England); All: 1,727 (June 17 vs. Colorado Springs)
- Average home league attendance: League: 15,511; All: 14,133
Home colors	Away colors

The 2015 Colorado Rapids season was the club's twentieth season of existence, and their twentieth season in Major League Soccer, the top tier of the American and Canadian soccer pyramids. The team began the season with three scoreless matches and were both the final team that failed to register a goal, and the last that did not allowed one. A loss in their fourth match extended their scoreless streak to four, and their winless streak dating back to last season to 18 matches. Both streaks ended on April 10 against FC Dallas, who the Rapids defeated 4–0.

== Club ==
=== Roster ===
Updated August 7, 2015.

No.	Position	Nation	Player
1	GK	USA	Clint Irwin
2	MF	USA	Nick LaBrocca
3	DF	USA	Drew Moor
4	DF	USA	Marc Burch
5	DF	USA	Michael Harrington
6	MF	USA	Sam Cronin
7	FW	URU	Vicente Sánchez
8	MF	USA	Dillon Powers
9	FW	IRL	Kevin Doyle (DP)
10	FW	PAN	Gabriel Torres (DP)
11	MF	BRA	Marcelo Sarvas
12	GK	USA	John Berner
13	DF	USA	Ben Newnam
14	FW	SEN	Dominique Badji
15	MF	ARG	Juan Ramírez (DP)
16	DF	USA	James Riley
17	MF	USA	Dillon Serna (HGP)
18	GK	USA	Zac MacMath (Loan)
19	FW	CMR	Charles Eloundou
21	FW	ARG	Luis Solignac
22	MF	ARG	Lucas Pittinari
23	DF	USA	Bobby Burling
29	FW	USA	Caleb Calvert
33	MF	USA	Jared Watts
44	DF	SWE	Axel Sjöberg
57	DF	USA	Carlos Alvarez
94	MF	USA	Marlon Hairston (GA)
—	DF	IRL	Sean St Ledger
—	DF	HON	Maynor Figueroa

=== Technical staff ===
As of November 26, 2014.

Position	Name
VP of soccer ops/technical director	Paul Bravo
Sporting director	Pádraig Smith
Director of soccer	Claudio López
Head coach	Pablo Mastroeni
Assistant coach	Brian Mullan
Assistant coach	Steve Cooke
Assistant coach/goalkeepers	Chris Sharpe
Team administrator	Erik Carlson
Assistant athletic trainer	Michael Heitkamp
Soccer operations coordinator	Brandy Lay

== Transfers ==
=== Transfers in ===
Date	Player	Position	Previous club	Fee/notes	Ref
December 8, 2014	(United States) Michael Harrington	DF	(United States) Portland Timbers	Acquired in exchange for allocation money	
January 6, 2015	(United States) Zac MacMath	GK	(United States) Philadelphia Union	On loan	
January 15, 2015	(Brazil) Marcelo Sarvas	MF	(United States) LA Galaxy	Acquired in addition to a 2015 international slot in exchange for 3rd spot in the allocation rankings and allocation money	
January 19, 2015	(United States) Sam Cronin	MF	(United States) San Jose Earthquakes	Acquired in exchange for allocation money	
January 31, 2015	(Argentina) Lucas Pittinari	MF	(Argentina) Club Atlético Belgrano	Loan	
February 17, 2015	(Argentina) Juan Ramirez	MF	(Argentina) Argentinos Juniors	Transfer	
March 6, 2015	(United States) James Riley	DF	(United States) LA Galaxy	Free Agent	
March 21, 2015	(United States) Ben Newnam	DF	(United States) Charlotte Independence	Signed from affiliate	
May 1, 2015	(Argentina) Luis Solignac	FW	(Argentina) Club Atlético Nueva Chicago	Transfer	
May 6, 2015	(Republic of Ireland) Kevin Doyle	FW	(England) Wolverhampton Wanderers	Free Agent	
August 7, 2015	(Republic of Ireland) Sean St Ledger	DF	(United States) Orlando City SC	Free Agent	
August 7, 2015	(Honduras) Maynor Figueroa	DF	(England) Hull City	Free Agent	

=== Transfers out ===
Date	Player	Position	Destination club	Fee/notes	Ref
November 25, 2014	(United States) Gale Agbossoumonde	DF	(United States) Tampa Bay Rowdies	Option Declined, later signed by Tampa Bay Rowdies	
November 25, 2014	(United States) Carlos Alvarez	DF	(United States) Colorado Rapids	Option Declined, later re-signed	
November 25, 2014	(United States) Davy Armstrong	MF	(United States) Colorado Springs Switchbacks	Option Declined, later signed by Colorado Springs Switchbacks	
November 25, 2014	(United States) Edson Buddle	FW	(United States) LA Galaxy	Option Declined, later signed by LA Galaxy	
November 25, 2014	(United States) Kamani Hill	FW		Option Declined	
November 25, 2014	(United States) Nick LaBrocca	MF	(United States) Colorado Rapids	Option Declined, later re-signed	
November 25, 2014	(Democratic Republic of the Congo) Danny Mwanga	MF	(United States) Orlando City SC	Option Declined, later selected by Orlando City SC in Expansion Draft	
November 25, 2014	(United States) Joe Nasco	GK	(United States) New England Revolution	Option Declined, later traded to New England Revolution	
November 25, 2014	(Austria) Thomas Piermayr	DF	(Belarus) Minsk	Option Declined	
November 25, 2014	(United States) Grant Van De Casteele	MF	(United States) Rochester Rhinos	Option Declined, later signed with Rochester Rhinos	
November 25, 2014	(United States) Marvell Wynne	DF	(United States) San Jose Earthquakes	Option Declined, later drafted by San Jose Earthquakes	
December 10, 2014	(United States) Tony Cascio	MF	(United States) Orlando City SC	Lost in Expansion Draft	
January 16, 2015	(United States) Chris Klute	MF	(United States) Columbus Crew	Traded to Columbus along with the 19th pick in the 2015 MLS SuperDraft in exchange for the 14th pick and allocation money	
January 19, 2015	(Spain) José Mari	MF	(Spain) Levante	Transferred	
February 2, 2015	(England) Zat Knight	DF	(England) Reading FC	Released by Mutual Consent, later signed with Reading FC	
January 16, 2015	(United States) John Neeskens	DF	(United States) New York Cosmos B	Waived	
March 17, 2015	(Jamaica) Deshorn Brown	FW	(Norway) Vålerenga	Transferred	
August 7, 2015	(United States) Shane O'Neill	DF	(Cyprus) Apollon Limassol	Transferred	

=== Draft picks ===
Date	Player	Position	Previous club	Fee/notes	Ref
November 19, 2014	(United States) Caleb Calvert	FW	(United States) Chivas USA	Selected with the 8th Pick of 2014 MLS Dispersal Draft	
December 10, 2014	(United States) Bobby Burling	DF	(United States) Chivas USA	Selected in the MLS Waiver Draft	
January 15, 2015	(Sweden) Axel Sjöberg	DF	(United States) Marquette University	Selected with the 14th pick of the 2015 MLS SuperDraft	
January 15, 2015	(United States) Joe Greenspan	DF	(United States) US Naval Academy	Selected with the 26th pick of the 2015 MLS SuperDraft	
January 20, 2015	(Senegal) Dominique Badji	FW	(United States) Boston University	Selected with the 67th pick of the 2015 MLS SuperDraft	
January 20, 2015	(United States) Matt Jeffery	DF	(United States) Monmouth University	Selected with the 78th pick of the 2015 MLS SuperDraft	
January 20, 2015	(United States) Brandon Fricke	DF	(United States) Butler University	Selected with the 83rd pick of the 2015 MLS SuperDraft	

== Competitions ==
=== Preseason ===
February 13, 2015 Friendly	UNLV Rebels	0–2	Colorado Rapids	Paradise, Nevada, U.S.
		Report	Montoya 62'; Badji 84'	Stadium: Peter Johann Memorial Field

February 15, 2015 Las Vegas Pro Soccer Challenge Cup	Colorado Rapids	0–2	San Jose Earthquakes	Las Vegas, Nevada, U.S.
7:00 PM PST	Cronin (yellow card) 38'	Report	Wondolowski (yellow card) 28', (goal) 43'; Harden (yellow card) 47'; Koval 74'	Stadium: Cashman Field

February 18, 2015 2015 Desert Diamond Cup	Colorado Rapids	2–2	Sporting Kansas City	Tucson, Arizona, U.S.
5:30 PM MST	Torres 12'; Badji 17'; Sarvas (yellow card) 29'; Cronin (yellow card) 64'; Flores (red card)	Report	Dwyer (yellow card) 23'; Nagamura (yellow card) 25'; Espinoza (yellow card) 30'; Németh 77'; Añor 78'	Stadium: Kino Veterans Memorial Stadium

February 21, 2015 2015 Desert Diamond Cup	Colorado Rapids	1–1	New England Revolution	Tucson, Arizona, U.S.
5:30 PM MST	Torres 48'	Report	Fagúndez 54'	Stadium: Kino Veterans Memorial Stadium

February 25, 2015 2015 Desert Diamond Cup	FC Tucson	0–1	Colorado Rapids	Tucson, Arizona, U.S.
5:30 PM MST		Report	Sjöberg 80'	Stadium: Kino Veterans Memorial Stadium

February 28, 2015 2015 Desert Diamond Cup	Colorado Rapids	1–2	Real Salt Lake	Tucson, Arizona, U.S.
7:00 PM MST	Serna 28'; Burling (yellow card) 41'; Torres (yellow card) 55'	Report	García 8'; Saborío (yellow card) 13' (yellow-red card) 50'; Beckerman (yellow card) 16'; Morales 51'	Stadium: Kino Veterans Memorial Stadium

=== MLS ===
March 7, 2015 1	Philadelphia Union	0–0	Colorado Rapids	Chester, Pennsylvania, U.S.
4:00 PM EST	Vitória (yellow card) 25'; Aristeguieta (yellow card) 90+7'		Burling (yellow card) 24' (red card); Sjöberg (yellow card) 45'; Serna (yellow card) 74'; Pittinari (yellow card) 90+7'	Stadium: PPL Park; Attendance: 18,022; Referee: Silviu Petrescu

March 22, 2015 2	Colorado Rapids	0–0	New York City FC	Commerce City, Colorado, U.S.
2:00 PM MDT	Badji (yellow card) 49'		Facey (yellow card) 51' (red card); Saunders (yellow card) 90'; Wingert (yellow card) 90+3'	Stadium: Dick's Sporting Goods Park; Attendance: 17,692; Referee: Sorin Stoica

March 28, 2015 3	Houston Dynamo	0–0	Colorado Rapids	Houston, Texas, U.S.
7:30 PM CDT	Clark (yellow card) 43'; López (yellow card) 68'; Sarkodie (yellow card) 84'		Watts (yellow card) 47'	Stadium: BBVA Compass Stadium; Attendance: 19,603; Referee: Marcos de Oliveira

April 4, 2015 4	Colorado Rapids	0–2	New England Revolution	Commerce City, Colorado, U.S.
5:00 PM MDT	Sarvas (yellow card) 32'; Powers (yellow card) 60'; Harrington (yellow card) 66'; Burch (yellow card) 90+6'	Report	Agudelo 18'; Davies (yellow card) 26'; Dorman (yellow card) 34'; Nguyen 54' (pen.); Tierney (yellow card) 90'	Stadium: Dick's Sporting Goods Park; Attendance: 11,450; Referee: Fotis Bazakos

April 10, 2015 5	FC Dallas	0–4	Colorado Rapids	Frisco, Texas, U.S.
6:00 PM CDT	Hollingshead (yellow card) 59'; Watson (yellow card) 90+2'	Report	Badji 2'; Powers 43'; Torres 70'; Serna 85'	Stadium: Toyota Stadium; Attendance: 12,929; Referee: Armando Villarreal

April 18, 2015 6	Colorado Rapids	1–3	Seattle Sounders FC	Commerce City, Colorado, U.S.
7:00 PM MDT	Torres 22'	Report	Neagle 5', 25'; Marshall (yellow card) 14'; Rose (yellow card) 66'; Martins 73'; Mears (yellow card) 74'	Stadium: Dick's Sporting Goods Park; Attendance: 13,134; Referee: Drew Fischer

April 24, 2015 7	Colorado Rapids	1–1	FC Dallas	Commerce City, Colorado, U.S.
8:00 PM MDT	Moor (yellow card) 58'; LaBrocca 79'	Report	Hedges (yellow card) 7'; Díaz 31'; Castillo (yellow card) 50'; Pérez (red card) 59'; Acosta (yellow card) 60'; Kennedy (yellow card) 66'	Stadium: Dick's Sporting Goods Park; Attendance: 12,944; Referee: Allen Chapman

April 29, 2015 8	New York Red Bulls	1–1	Colorado Rapids	Harrison, New Jersey, U.S.
7:30 PM EDT	Wright-Phillips 30' (pen.); Sam (yellow card) 57'	Report	Torres 25'; LaBrocca (yellow card) 54'; Burling (yellow card) 90+1'; Pittinari (yellow card) 90+2'	Stadium: Red Bull Arena; Attendance: 12,944; Referee: Mark Geiger

May 2, 2015 9	LA Galaxy	1–1	Colorado Rapids	Carson, California, U.S.
7:30 PM PDT	Gargan (yellow card) 13'; Gordon 75'; Rogers (yellow card) 82'	Report	LaBrocca (yellow card) 25'; Torres 40'; Cronin (yellow card) 49'; Riley (yellow card) 88'	Stadium: StubHub Center; Attendance: 16,676; Referee: Fotis Bazakos

May 8, 2015 10	Colorado Rapids	1–1	San Jose Earthquakes	Commerce City, Colorado, U.S.
8:00 PM MDT	Moor (yellow card) 26'; Cronin (yellow card) 52'; Riley 90+3'	Report	Wondolowski 19'; Bingham (yellow card) 90+1'	Stadium: Dick's Sporting Goods Park; Attendance: 14,169; Referee: Baldomero Toledo

May 16, 2015	Colorado Rapids	Postponed	Sporting Kansas City	Commerce City, Colorado, U.S.
				Stadium: Dick's Sporting Goods Park

May 23, 2015 11	Colorado Rapids	1–0	Vancouver Whitecaps FC	Commerce City, Colorado, U.S.
7:00 PM MDT	Cronin (yellow card) 43'; Pittinari 51'; Doyle (yellow card) 87'	Report	Froese (yellow card) 24'; Koffie (yellow card) 75'; Waston (yellow card) 79'	Stadium: Dick's Sporting Goods Park; Attendance: 17,791

May 27, 2015 12	Seattle Sounders FC	1–0	Colorado Rapids	Seattle, Washington, U.S.
7:00 PM PDT	Pappa 15'; Alonso (yellow card) 55'; Evans (yellow card) 64'	Report	Watts (yellow card) 44'	Stadium: CenturyLink Field; Attendance: 39,757

May 30, 2015 13	Colorado Rapids	1–2	Portland Timbers	Commerce City, Colorado, U.S.
7:00 PM MDT	Cronin (yellow card) 44', (goal) 89'; Riley (yellow card) 46'; Sjöberg (yellow card) 58'	Report	Fernández 38'; Jewsbury (yellow card) 42', (goal) 90+3'	Stadium: Dick's Sporting Goods Park; Attendance: 18,209

June 7, 2015 14; Rocky Mountain Cup	Real Salt Lake	0–0	Colorado Rapids	Sandy, Utah, U.S.
3:00 PM MDT	Stertzer (yellow card) 25'	Report	Sjöberg (yellow card) 32'; Burling (yellow card) 79'	Stadium: Rio Tinto Stadium; Attendance: 18,895

June 19, 2015 15	Colorado Rapids	1–1	FC Dallas	Commerce City, Colorado, U.S.
7:00 PM MDT	Burling (yellow card) 9'; Riley (yellow card) 84'; Serna 88'	Report	Ulloa (yellow card) 18'; Castillo 71'; Kennedy (yellow card) 80'	Stadium: Dick's Sporting Goods Park; Attendance: 15,585

June 24, 2015 16	Orlando City SC	2–0	Colorado Rapids	Orlando, Florida, U.S.
7:30 PM EDT	Larin 62'; Kaká 65'; Ramos (yellow card) 67'	Report	Serna (yellow card) 40'	Stadium: Citrus Bowl; Attendance: 23,372

June 27, 2015 17	Sporting Kansas City	2–0	Colorado Rapids	Kansas City, Kansas, U.S.
5:30 PM CDT	Németh 32'; Cronin 64' (o.g.); Dwyer (yellow card) 80'; Peterson (yellow card) 90+2'	Report	Watts (yellow card) 52'; Greenspan (yellow card) 61'; Doyle (yellow card) 70'	Stadium: Sporting Park; Attendance: 19,835

July 4, 2015 18	Colorado Rapids	2–1	Vancouver Whitecaps FC	Commerce City, Colorado, U.S.
7:00 PM MDT	Sánchez 2'; Doyle 56'; Watts (yellow card) 65'; Pittinari (yellow card) 72'; Moor (yellow card) 77'	Report	Manneh (yellow card) 20'; Techera (yellow card) 29'; Rodríguez (yellow card) 61'	Stadium: Dick's Sporting Goods Park; Attendance: 18,356

July 11, 2015 19; Rocky Mountain Cup	Colorado Rapids	3–1	Real Salt Lake	Commerce City, Colorado, U.S.
7:00 PM MDT	Moor 81'; Burling (yellow card) 83'; Watts 90+1'; Ramírez 90+7'	Summary	Jaime 79' (red card) 84'	Stadium: Dick's Sporting Goods Park; Attendance: 15,248; Referee: (United States) Edvin Jurisevic

July 18, 2015 20	Seattle Sounders FC	0–1	Colorado Rapids	Seattle, Washington, U.S.
7:00 PM PDT	Friberg (yellow card) 30'; Mears (yellow card) 71'	Summary	Pittinari (yellow card) 12'; Harrington (yellow card) 79'; Doyle 84'	Stadium: CenturyLink Field; Attendance: 40,403; Referee: (United States) Baldomero Toledo

August 1, 2015 21	Colorado Rapids	1–3	LA Galaxy	Commerce City, Colorado, U.S.
7:00 PM MDT	Marcelo Sarvas 11'; Burling (yellow card) 41'; Cronin (yellow card) 42'	Summary	Lletget 56'; Gordon 69'; Buddle (yellow card) 80'; Garcia (yellow card) 88'; Keane (yellow card) 90+1' (goal) 90+3'	Stadium: Dick's Sporting Goods Park; Attendance: 18,597; Referee: (United States) Juan Guzmán

August 8, 2015 22	Colorado Rapids	1–2	Columbus Crew SC	Commerce City, Colorado, U.S.
7:00 PM MDT	Doyle (yellow card) 7'; Watts (yellow card) 30'; Burling 42'; Sjöberg (yellow card) 50' (yellow-red card); Burch (yellow card) 61'	Summary	Kamara 52' 64'; Klute (yellow card) 67'; Barson (yellow card) 73'; Higuaín (yellow card) 90+2'	Stadium: Dick's Sporting Goods Park; Attendance: 16,656; Referee: (Republic of Ireland) Alan Kelly (referee)

August 14, 2015 23	San Jose Earthquakes	1–0	Colorado Rapids	San Jose, California, U.S.
8:00 PM CDT	Bernárdez (yellow card) 49'; Goodson 53'; Pelosi (yellow card) 88'	Summary	Burling (yellow card) 65'; Cronin (yellow card) 74'; Figueroa (yellow card) 84'	Stadium: Avaya Stadium; Attendance: 18,000; Referee: (United States) Allen Chapman

August 22, 2015 24	Chicago Fire	0–1	Colorado Rapids	Bridgeview, Illinois, U.S.
5:30 PM CDT	Larentowicz (yellow card) 35'; Nyarko (yellow card) 51'	Summary	Serna 1'; Irwin (yellow card) 10'; Moor (yellow card) 82'; Torres (yellow card) 89'	Stadium: Toyota Park; Attendance: 18,317; Referee: (United States) Sorin Stoica

August 26, 2015 25	Colorado Rapids	2–1	Houston Dynamo	Commerce City, Colorado, U.S.
7:00 PM MDT	Sánchez 20' (pen.); Burling (yellow card) 36'; Cronin (yellow card) 39'; Ramírez (yellow card) 76'; Doyle 79'	Summary	Davis 37' (pen.); Bruin (yellow card) 48'; Alex (yellow card) 58'	Stadium: Dick's Sporting Goods Park; Attendance: 10,439; Referee: (Canada) Drew Fischer

August 29, 2015 26	Colorado Rapids	2–1	Sporting Kansas City	Commerce City, Colorado, U.S.
7:00 PM MDT	Figueroa 53'; Sjöberg (yellow card) 58'; Marcelo Sarvas (yellow card) 72'; Doyle 76'; Moor (yellow card) 90'	Summary	Abdul-Salaam (yellow card) 34'; Dwyer 47'; Sinovic (yellow card) 60'	Stadium: Dick's Sporting Goods Park; Attendance: 16,480; Referee: (United States) Jorge Gonzalez

September 9, 2015 27	Vancouver Whitecaps FC	2–0	Colorado Rapids	Vancouver, British Columbia, Canada
7:00 PM PDT	Koffie (yellow card) 38'; Beitashour (yellow card) 54'; Rivero 73' (yellow card) 74'; Techera 77'; Froese (yellow card) 83'	Summary	Burch (yellow card) 69'; Riley (yellow card) 87'	Stadium: BC Place; Attendance: 17,583; Referee: (United States) Allen Chapman

September 12, 2015 28	Colorado Rapids	1–1	D.C. United	Commerce City, Colorado, U.S.
7:00 PM MDT	Burling 28'; Sánchez (yellow card) 65'	Summary	Birnbaum 87'	Stadium: Dick's Sporting Goods Park; Attendance: 15,943; Referee: (United States) Sorin Stoica

September 19, 2015 29	Toronto FC	3–1	Colorado Rapids	Toronto, Ontario, Canada
2:00 PM CDT	Giovinco 14' 18'; Perquis 38'; Morrow (yellow card) 45'; Altidore (yellow card) 58'; Moore (yellow card) 73'; Delgado (yellow card) 88'	Summary	Figueroa (yellow card) 24'; Powers 40'; Pittinari (yellow card) 61'; Cronin (yellow card) 77'	Stadium: BMO Field; Attendance: 19,692; Referee: (Canada) Mathieu Bourdeau

September 26, 2015 30	Houston Dynamo	3–2	Colorado Rapids	Houston, Texas, U.S.
7:30 PM CDT	Miranda 3'; Barnes 24'; Davis 47'; Raúl Rodríguez (yellow card) 78'	Summary	Sánchez 8' 44'; Marcelo Sarvas (yellow card) 66'	Stadium: BBVA Compass Stadium; Attendance: 20,343; Referee: (United States) Allen Chapman

October 4, 2015 31; Rocky Mountain Cup	Colorado Rapids	1–2	Real Salt Lake	Commerce City, Colorado, U.S.
5:00 PM MDT	Doyle 16'	Summary	Plata 33'; Mulholland 43'	Stadium: Dick's Sporting Goods Park; Attendance: 16,048; Referee: Mark Kadlecik

October 10, 2015 32	Colorado Rapids	0–1	Montreal Impact	Commerce City, Colorado, U.S.
4:00 PM MDT	Powers (yellow card) 14'; Ramírez (yellow card) 37'	Summary	Drogba 15'; Ciman (yellow card) 43'	Stadium: Dick's Sporting Goods Park; Attendance: 17,427; Referee: (United States) Juan Guzmán

October 21, 2015 33	Sporting Kansas City	0–2	Colorado Rapids	Kansas City, Kansas, U.S.
7:30 PM CDT	Németh (yellow card) 78'; Ellis (yellow card) 89'	Summary	Cronin (yellow card) 42' (yellow-red card); Powers 78'; Ramírez (yellow card) 80'; Macmath (yellow card) 85'; Marcelo Sarvas 86'	Stadium: Sporting Park; Attendance: 18,897; Referee: (United States) Fotis Bazakos

October 25, 2015 34	Portland Timbers	4–1	Colorado Rapids	Portland, Oregon, U.S.
4:00 PM PDT	Nagbe 5' 33'; Powell (yellow card) 24'; Melano (yellow card) 53'; Villafaña 63'; Adi 88'		Badji 13'; Powers (yellow card) 40'; Pittinari (yellow card) 53'	Stadium: Providence Park; Attendance: 21144; Referee: Baldomero Toledo

==== Results by round ====
Round	1	2	3	4	5	6	7	8	9	10	11	12	13	14	15	16	17	18	19	20	21	22	23	24	25	26	27	28	29	30	31	32	33	34
Stadium	A	H	A	H	A	H	H	A	A	H	H	A	H	A	H	A	A	H	H	A	H	H	A	A	H	H	A	H	A	A	H	H	A	A
Result	D	D	D	L	W	L	D	D	D	D	W	L	L	D	D	L	L	W	W	W	L	L	L	W	W	W	L	D	L	L	L	L	W	L

Updated to match(es) played on 10 October 2015. Source: Colorado Rapids
A = Away; H = Home; W = Win; D = Draw; L = Loss

==== Standings ====
===== Western Conference standings =====
Pos	Team	Pld	W	L	T	GF	GA	GD	Pts	Qualification
6	Sporting Kansas City	34	14	11	9	48	45	+3	51	Qualification for the knockout round
7	San Jose Earthquakes	34	13	13	8	41	39	+2	47	
8	Houston Dynamo	34	11	14	9	42	49	−7	42	
9	Real Salt Lake	34	11	15	8	38	48	−10	41	
10	Colorado Rapids	34	9	15	10	33	43	−10	37	

Source: MLS

===== Overall table =====
Note: the table below has no impact on playoff qualification and is used solely for determining host of the MLS Cup, certain CCL spots, and 2015 MLS draft. The conference tables are the sole determinant for teams qualifying to the playoffs

Pos	Team	Pld	W	L	T	GF	GA	GD	Pts
16	Real Salt Lake	34	11	15	8	38	48	−10	41
17	New York City FC	34	10	17	7	49	58	−9	37
18	Philadelphia Union	34	10	17	7	42	55	−13	37
19	Colorado Rapids	34	9	15	10	33	43	−10	37
20	Chicago Fire	34	8	20	6	43	58	−15	30

Source: MLS
Rules for classification: 1) points; 2) total wins; 3) total goal differential; 4) total goals scored

=== U.S. Open Cup ===
Colorado will enter the 2015 U.S. Open Cup with the rest of Major League Soccer in the fourth round.

June 16, 2015 Fourth round	Colorado Rapids	4–1	Colorado Springs Switchbacks	Commerce City, Colorado, U.S.
7:00 PM MDT	Badji 26'; Greenspan 32'; Serna 65', 90', (yellow card) 71'	Report	Bejarano (yellow card) 61'; Phillips (red card) 61'; Burt 90'	Stadium: Dick's Sporting Goods Park; Attendance: 1,727; Referee: Chipalo Street

June 30, 2015 Fifth round	Houston Dynamo (Texas)	1–0	Colorado Rapids	Houston, Texas, U.S.
8:00 PM CDT	Sturgis (yellow card) 11'; Manotas 43'	Report	Hairston (yellow card) 26'; O'Neill (yellow card) 55'	Stadium: BBVA Compass Stadium; Attendance: 800; Referee: Nima Saghafi
