= 2026 Colorado Rapids season =

Season of an American soccer team

Colorado Rapids
2026 season
- Owner: Stan Kroenke
- Head coach: Matt Wells
- Major League Soccer: Conference: 7th Overall: 12th
- U.S. Open Cup: Semifinals
- Top goalscorer: League: Rafael Navarro (10); All: Rafael Navarro (11)
Home colors	Away colors	Third colors

The 2026 Colorado Rapids season is the 31st season of the club's existence and the 31st season in Major League Soccer (MLS), and the top tier of American soccer pyramid.

== Management team ==
Front office
Owner	Stan Kroenke
President	Pádraig Smith
Sporting Director	Fran Taylor
Director of Player Personnel	Brian Crookham
Assistant Director of Player Personnel	James Roeling
Technical Director	Chris Cartlidge
Director of Scouting	Alex Aldridge
Director of Analytics	Matthew Pfeffer
Data Scientist	Karan Juneja
Coaching staff
Head coach	Matt Wells
Assistant coach	Alastair Harris
Assistant coach	Rob Burch
Assistant & goalkeeping coach	Chris Sharpe
Assistant coach	Elliot Prost
Development coach	Drew Moor
Team analyst	Matt Gordon
Team analyst	Padraic Farrell

== Roster ==
As of September 9, 2026

Note: Flags indicate national team as defined under FIFA eligibility rules; some limited exceptions apply. Players may hold more than one non-FIFA nationality.

No.	Pos.	Nation	Player
1	GK	USA	Zack Steffen
2	DF	USA	Keegan Rosenberry
4	DF	USA	Reggie Cannon
5	DF	ESP	Loïc Williams
6	DF	ENG	Rob Holding
8	MF	NGR	Hamzat Ojediran
10	MF	USA	Paxten Aaronson
12	MF	USA	Josh Atencio
13	MF	TTO	Wayne Frederick
15	MF	GHA	Ali Fadal
16	FW	USA	Alex Harris
21	MF	USA	Ted Ku-DiPietro
24	DF	USA	Noah Cobb
26	FW	SEN	Mamadou Billo Diop

No.	Pos.	Nation	Player
27	FW	CAN	Kimani Stewart-Baynes
29	DF	VEN	Miguel Navarro (on loan from Talleres)
31	GK	USA	Adam Beaudry
32	FW	LCA	Donavan Phillip
33	DF	CAN	Kosi Thompson
41	GK	USA	Nicolas Defreitas-Hansen
47	FW	CAN	Sydney Wathuta
77	FW	USA	Darren Yapi
88	MF	FRA	Youssef Maziz
93	FW	BFA	Georgi Minoungou
99	DF	USA	Jackson Travis
—	FW	ISR	Sayed Abu Farchi
—	MF	GHA	Ibrahim Sadiq
—	FW	ENG	Morgan Whittaker

=== Out on loan ===
Note: Flags indicate national team as defined under FIFA eligibility rules; some limited exceptions apply. Players may hold more than one non-FIFA nationality.

No.	Pos.	Nation	Player
18	FW	USA	Bryce Jamison (on loan to Colorado Springs Switchbacks)

== Player movement ==
=== MLS SuperDraft picks ===
Draft picks are not automatically signed to the team roster. The 2026 MLS SuperDraft was held on December 18, 2025. Colorado Rapids made six selections.

2026 Colorado Rapids MLS SuperDraft Picks
Round	Selection	Player	Position	College	Status
1	6	(Senegal) Mamadou Billo Diop	FW	—N/a	
1	10	(Indonesia) Mitchell Baker	FW	(Washington, D.C.) Georgetown Hoyas	
1	26	(Ghana) Wahabu Musah	FW	(South Carolina) Clemson Tigers	
2	56	(United States) Asher Hestad	DF	(Washington (state)) Washington Huskies	
3	70	(United States) Koven Johnson	DF	(North Carolina) High Point Panthers	
3	86	(United States) Jabari De Coteau	DF	(Ohio) Xavier Musketeers	Signed with Colorado Rapids 2

=== Transfers in ===
No.	Name	Pos.	Transferred from	Fee/notes	Date	Ref.
22	(Australia) Lucas Herrington	DF	(Australia) Brisbane Roar	Signed a contract agreement to join on January 1, 2026; undisclosed fee	August 13, 2025	
24	(United States) Noah Cobb	DF	(United States) Atlanta United	Trade for $775,000 in general allocation money (GAM) and sell-on percentage	December 9, 2025	
7	(Trinidad and Tobago) Dante Sealy	FW	(Canada) CF Montréal	Trade for $2.5m in GAM and sell-on percentage	December 23, 2025	
8	(Nigeria) Hamzat Ojediran	MF	(France) RC Lens	Undisclosed fee	January 8, 2026	
32	(Saint Lucia) Donavan Phillip	DF	(United States) NC State Wolfpack	Picked in the 2025 MLS SuperDraft; signed the following season	January 23, 2026	
47	(Canada) Sydney Wathuta	FW	(United States) Colorado Rapids 2	Homegrown player contract	February 2, 2026	
29	(Venezuela) Miguel Navarro	DF	(Argentina) Talleres	One year loan	February 17, 2026	
5	(Spain) Loïc Williams	DF	(Spain) Granada CF	Signed a contract agreement to join July 13, 2026; undisclosed fee	March 25, 2026	
33	(Canada) Kosi Thompson	DF	(Canada) Toronto FC	Trade for $200,000 in 2026 GAM and $200,000 in conditional GAM	March 26, 2026	
93	(Burkina Faso) Georgi Minoungou	FW	(United States) Seattle Sounders FC	Trade for $1m in 2026 GAM, $1m in 2027 GAM and sell-on percentage	March 27, 2026	
88	(France) Youssef Maziz	MF	(Belgium) OH Leuven	Free transfer	July 31, 2026	
	(Israel) Sayed Abu Farchi	FW	(Israel) Maccabi Tel Aviv	Undisclosed fee, U22 initiative	September 1, 2026	
	(Ghana) Ibrahim Sadiq	MF	(Netherlands) AZ	Undisclosed fee	September 2, 2026	
	(England) Morgan Whittaker	FW	(England) Middlesbrough	Undisclosed fee, Designated Player	September 2, 2026	

=== Transfers out ===
No.	Name	Pos.	Transferred to	Fee/notes	Date	Ref.
45	(Cameroon) Daouda Amadou	MF	(Sweden) Helsingborgs IF	Contract option declined; signed with Helsingborgs IF on December 31, 2025	November 26, 2025	
18	(United States) Sam Bassett	MF	(United States) Pittsburgh Riverhounds SC	Contract option declined; signed with Pittsburgh Riverhounds SC on February 21, 2026	November 26, 2025	
34	(United States) Michael Edwards	DF	(United States) Oakland Roots	Contract option declined; signed with Oakland Roots on January 26, 2026	November 26, 2025	
14	(England) Calvin Harris	FW	(United States) Sporting Kansas City	Contract expired; signed with Sporting Kansas City on January 15, 2026	November 26, 2025	
56	(United States) Nate Jones	DF	(United States) Las Vegas Lights FC	Contract option declined	November 26, 2025	
8	(United States) Oliver Larraz	MF	(Canada) Vancouver Whitecaps	Contract expired; signed with Vancouver Whitecaps on January 15, 2026	November 26, 2025	
5	(Denmark) Andreas Maxsø	DF	(United Arab Emirates) Kalba	Contract option declined; signed with Kalba on February 8, 2026	November 26, 2025	
30	(Brazil) Rafael Santos	DF	(United States) St. Louis City SC	Contract option declined; signed with St. Louis City SC on January 27, 2026	November 26, 2025	
23	(United States) Cole Bassett	MF	(United States) Portland Timbers	$2.6m trade plus up to $1.05m in performance based incentives	February 2, 2026	
31	(United States) Adam Beaudry	GK	(United States) Loudoun United FC	One-year loan	February 5, 2026	
3	(United States) Sam Vines	DF	(United States) Houston Dynamo FC	Waived, signed with Houston Dynamo on March 20, 2026	February 21, 2026	
20	(Republic of Ireland) Connor Ronan	MF	(Scotland) Aberdeen	Undisclosed fee	July 1, 2026	
19	(United States) Ian Murphy	DF	(United States) San Diego FC	Trade for a 2027 MLS SuperDraft second-round pick and up to $100,000 in conditional GAM	July 13, 2026	
22	(Australia) Lucas Herrington	DF	(England) Hull City	Undisclosed fee and sell on clause	August 12, 2026	
18	(United States) Bryce Jamison	FW	(United States) Colorado Springs Switchbacks	Loan until the end of the 2026 season	August 18, 2026	
7	(Trinidad and Tobago) Dante Sealy	FW	(Canada) CF Montréal	Trade for $400,000 in 2026 GAM, $1m in 2027 GAM and up to $300,000 in conditional GAM	August 28, 2026	
9	(Brazil) Rafael Navarro	FW	(United States) St. Louis City SC	Trade for $12m and a conditional $250,000	September 3, 2026	

== Competitions ==
Win Draw Loss

All matches are in Mountain Time.

=== Preseason ===
Colorado Rapids had a preseason training camp in Palm Beach, Florida, where they faced three opponents in closed door friendlies.

January 19 Friendly	Colorado Rapids	1–3	Nashville SC	Palm Beach, Florida
8:30 a.m. MST	Yapi 16'	Report	Mukhtar 36'; Pacius 46'; Madrigal 67'

February 7 Friendly	Colorado Rapids	1–4	Columbus Crew	Palm Beach, Florida
9:00 a.m. MST	Manyona 90+7'	Report	50', 61', 77', 85'

February 14 Friendly	Orlando City SC	1–4	Colorado Rapids	Palm Beach, Florida
5:00 p.m. MST	Atuesta 61'	Report	Navarro 19', 37'; Yapi 63'; Herrington 79'

=== Major League Soccer (MLS) ===
==== Standings ====
MLS Western Conference table (2026)
Pos	Team	Pld	W	L	T	GF	GA	GD	Pts
10	Minnesota United FC	34	11	12	11	56	58	−2	44
11	LA Galaxy	34	11	12	11	50	57	−7	44
12	Colorado Rapids	34	12	15	7	47	50	−3	43
13	San Diego FC	34	9	14	11	57	63	−6	38
14	Austin FC	34	8	16	10	42	65	−23	34

Source: MLS
Rules for classification: 1) points; 2) total wins; 3) total goal differential; 4) total goals scored; 5) fewer disciplinary points; 6) away goal differential; 7) away goals scored; 8) home goals differential; 9) home goals scored; 10) coin toss (2 clubs tied) or drawing of lots (≥3 clubs tied)

Overall MLS standings table
Pos	Team	Pld	W	L	T	GF	GA	GD	Pts
19	Minnesota United FC	34	11	12	11	56	58	−2	44
20	LA Galaxy	34	11	12	11	50	57	−7	44
21	Colorado Rapids	34	12	15	7	47	50	−3	43
22	New York Red Bulls	34	12	16	6	48	62	−14	42
23	New York City FC	34	10	12	12	49	45	+4	42

Source: MLS
Rules for classification: 1) points; 2) total wins; 3) total goal differential; 4) total goals scored; 5) fewer disciplinary points; 6) away goal differential; 7) away goals scored; 8) home goals differential; 9) home goals scored; 10) coin toss (2 clubs tied) or drawing of lots (≥3 clubs tied)

== Overview ==
Competition	First match	Last match	Starting round	Final position	Record							
Competition	First match	Last match	Starting round	Final position	Pld	W	D	L	GF	GA	GD	Win %
Major League Soccer	February 22, 2026	November 7, 2026	Matchday 1	TBD	22	10	1	11	31	28	+3	45.45
MLS Cup playoffs	TBD	TBD	TBD	TBD	0	0	0	0	0	0	+0	—
U.S. Open Cup	April 14, 2026	TBD	Round of 32	TBD	3	3	0	0	5	2	+3	100.00
Total					25	13	1	11	36	30	+6	52.00

Source: Competitions

== Results summary ==
Overall								Home						Away					
Pld	Pts	W	L	T	GF	GA	GD	W	L	T	GF	GA	GD	W	L	T	GF	GA	GD
34	43	12	15	7	47	50	−3	10	4	3	31	19	+12	2	11	4	16	31	−15

Last updated: Complete
Source: MLS Results
Pld = Matches played; Pts = Points; W = Matches won; T = Matches tied; L = Matches lost; GF = Goals for; GA = Goals against; GD = Goal difference

== Results by round ==
Round	1	2	3	4	5	6	7	8	9	10	11	12	13	14	15	16	17	18	19	20	21	22	23	24	25	26	27	28	29	30	31	32	33	34
Stadium	A	H	H	A	A	A	H	H	A	A	A	H	A	A	H	H	A	H	H	H	A	H	A	A	H	H	A	H	H	A	H	A	H	A
Result	L	W	W	L	W	L	W	L	D	L	L	L	W	L	L	W	L	W	W	W	L	W	L	D	W	D	L	D	D	D	W	D	L	L
Points	0	3	6	6	9	9	12	12	13	13	13	13	16	16	16	19	19	22	25	28	28	31	31	32	35	36	36	37	38	39	42	43	43	43
Position (West)	14	11	5	7	7	8	6	8	7	9	9	11	9	11	11	11	13	11	8	7	7	7	7	7	7	7	7	8	8	9	8	7	9	12

Source: Match reports
A = Away; H = Home; N = Neutral; W = Win; D = Draw; L = Loss; = Conference leader; = Playoffs berth; = Wild card berth

== Match results ==
=== MLS ===
Win Draw Loss Void Postponed

February 22 1	Seattle Sounders FC	2–0	Colorado Rapids	Seattle, Washington
7:00 p.m. MST	Rusnák 15'; Roldan (yellow card) 61'; Rothrock 62'; Brunell (yellow card) 73'	Report	M. Navarro (yellow card) 23'; Cobb (yellow card) 30'; Sealy (yellow card) 40'; Cannon (yellow card) 42'	Stadium: Lumen Field; Attendance: 31,606; Referee: Malik Badawi

February 28 2	Colorado Rapids	2–0	Portland Timbers	Commerce City, Colorado
2:30 p.m. MST	Ojediran 7'; Atencio (yellow card) 22'; Herrington 53', (yellow card) 73'	Report	Pantemis (yellow card) 73'; Fory (red card) 77'; Chará (yellow card) 83'	Stadium: Dick's Sporting Goods Park; Attendance: 16,113; Referee: Jair Marrufo

March 7 3	Colorado Rapids	4–1	LA Galaxy	Commerce City, Colorado
7:30 p.m. MST	Yapi 23'; Manyoma 76'; R. Navarro 85', 89'	Report	Pec (yellow card) 45+1' (yellow-red card) 60'; Klauss 56'; Glesnes (yellow card) 88'	Stadium: Dick's Sporting Goods Park; Attendance: 14,568; Referee: Allen Chapman

March 14 4	New York City FC	3–1	Colorado Rapids	New York, New York
5:30 p.m. MDT	Fernández 22', 45', (yellow card) 31'; O'Neill (yellow card) 39'; Magno 86'	Report	Ojediran (yellow card) 8'; Yapi (yellow card) 42', (goal) 45+4'	Stadium: Yankee Stadium; Attendance: 18,079; Referee: Brandon Stevis

March 21 5	Sporting Kansas City	1–4	Colorado Rapids	Kansas City, Kansas
6:30 p.m. MDT	García (yellow card) 5'; Miller (yellow card) 38'; Suleymanov 44'; Bartlett (yellow card) 77'	Report	Aaronson 12', 75'; Herrington (yellow card) 39'; Holding (yellow card) 42'; Frederick 45+2'; M. Navarro (yellow card) 60'; R. Navarro 71'	Stadium: Sporting Park; Attendance: 17,037; Referee: Fotis Bazakos

April 4 6	Toronto FC	3–2	Colorado Rapids	Toronto, Ontario
11:00 a.m. MDT	Zimmerman (yellow card) 41'; Edwards (red card) 49'; Laryea 65', (yellow card) 86'; Monlouis (yellow card) 69'; Steffen 77' (o.g.); Sargent 85'	Report	Travis (red card) 34'; Aaronson 51'; Rosenberry 54'; M. Navarro (yellow card) 64' (yellow-red card) 74'; Atencio (yellow card) 73'; Cobb (yellow card) 89'; Ojediran (yellow card) 90+2'	Stadium: BMO Field; Attendance: 14,442; Referee: Ricardo Montero

April 11 7	Colorado Rapids	6–2	Houston Dynamo FC	Commerce City, Colorado
7:30 p.m. MDT	Thompson 5', 53'; Atencio 17', (yellow card) 89'; R. Navarro 73', 90+5' (pen.); Andrade 90+1' (o.g.)	Report	Ennali 69'; Resch (yellow card) 77'; Guilherme 90+3'	Stadium: Dick's Sporting Goods Park; Attendance: 15,102; Referee: Sergii Boiko

April 18 8	Colorado Rapids	2–3	Inter Miami CF	Denver, Colorado
2:30 p.m. MDT	Atencio (yellow card) 18'; R. Navarro 58'; Yapi 62'; Frederick (yellow card) 64'; Herrington (yellow card) 76'; Travis (yellow card) 90+4'	Report	Messi 18' (pen.), 79', (yellow card) 90+3'; De Paul (yellow card) 22'; Micael (yellow card) 29'; Berterame 45+5'; Segovia (yellow card) 86'; Bright (red card) 87'	Stadium: Empower Field at Mile High; Attendance: 75,824; Referee: Jon Freemon

April 22 9	Los Angeles FC	0–0	Colorado Rapids	Los Angeles, California
8:30 p.m. MDT	Palencia (yellow card) 64'; Tafari (yellow card) 90+2'	Report	Thompson (yellow card) 40'; Ojediran (yellow card) 68'; Minoungou (yellow card) 80'; Atencio (yellow card) 86'	Stadium: BMO Stadium; Attendance: 22,132; Referee: Victor Rivas

April 25 10	Vancouver Whitecaps FC	3–1	Colorado Rapids	Vancouver, British Columbia
8:30 p.m. MDT	Sabaly 7'; White 23', 85'; Caicedo (yellow card) 90+2'	Report	R. Navarro 33'; M. Navarro (yellow card) 82'	Stadium: BC Place; Attendance: 27,589; Referee: Lorenzo Hernandez

May 2 11	Houston Dynamo FC	1–0	Colorado Rapids	Houston, Texas
6:30 p.m. MDT	Andrade (yellow card) 31'; Bogusz (yellow card) 56'; Ennali (yellow card) 63', (goal) 72'	Report	Ojediran (yellow card) 43'; Manyoma (yellow card) 47'; Yapi (yellow card) 66'	Stadium: Shell Energy Stadium; Attendance: 18,889; Referee: Allen Chapman

May 9 12	Colorado Rapids	0–1	St. Louis City SC	Commerce City, Colorado
7:30 p.m. MDT	Ojediran (yellow card) 19'; R. Navarro (yellow card) 44'; Holding (red card) 51'; M. Navarro (yellow card) 55'	Report	Jeong Sang-bin 26'; McSorley (yellow card) 58'; Wallem (yellow card) 67'; Durkin (yellow card) 86' (yellow-red card) 87'; Perez (yellow card) 90+4'	Stadium: Dick's Sporting Goods Park; Attendance: 16,028; Referee: Timothy Ford

May 13 13	Minnesota United FC	0–1	Colorado Rapids	Saint Paul, Minnesota
6:30 p.m. MDT	Duggan (yellow card) 1'; Yeboah (yellow card) 21'; Díaz (yellow card) 76'; Chancalay (yellow card) 83'; Trapp (yellow card) 84'	Report	R. Navarro 26' (yellow card) 86'; Thompson (yellow card) 69'	Stadium: Allianz Field; Attendance: 18,458; Referee: Elijio Arreguin

May 16 14	Real Salt Lake	2–1	Colorado Rapids	Sandy, Utah
7:30 p.m. MDT	Gozo 36', (yellow card) 81'; Solans 68'; Yedlin (yellow card) 90+3'	Report	Frederick 7'; Ojediran (yellow card) 34'; Atencio (yellow card) 67'; Cannon (yellow card) 74'	Stadium: America First Field; Attendance: 21,424; Referee: Malik Badawi

May 23 15	Colorado Rapids	1–2	FC Dallas	Commerce City, Colorado
7:30 p.m. MDT	Aaronson 13', (yellow card) 73'; Herrington (yellow card) 45+4'; M. Navarro (yellow card) 70'; Frederick (red card) 87'	Report	Farrington 12' (pen.), (yellow card) 45+4'; Moreno 45' (pen.); Delgado (yellow card) 50'; Sarver (yellow card) 90+1'	Stadium: Dick's Sporting Goods Park; Attendance: 17,142; Referee: Ismail Elfath

July 22 16	Colorado Rapids	1–0	San Diego FC	Commerce City, Colorado
7:30 p.m. MDT	Williams (yellow card) 22', (goal) 90+6'; Cannon (yellow card) 28'; R. Navarro (yellow card) 82'; Yapi (yellow card) 84'	Report	McVey (yellow card) 19'; Murphy (yellow card) 71'; Morgan (yellow card) 90+5'	Stadium: Dick's Sporting Goods Park; Attendance: 15,109; Referee: Chris Penso

July 25 17	St. Louis City SC	1–0	Colorado Rapids	St. Louis, Missouri
6:30 p.m. MDT	Durkin (yellow card) 45+3'; Ostrák 83'	Report	Holding (red card) 12'; Ojediran (yellow card) 25'; Atencio (yellow card) 68'; Thompson (yellow card) 90+6'	Stadium: Energizer Park; Attendance: 22,423; Referee: Nabil Bensalah

August 1 18	Colorado Rapids	1–0	Austin FC	Commerce City, Colorado
7:30 p.m. MDT	R. Navarro 90+4' (pen.), (yellow card) 90+5'	Report	Torres (yellow card) 70'; Rosales (yellow card) 72'; Płacheta (yellow card) 90+2'; Uzuni (yellow card) 90+3'	Stadium: Dick's Sporting Goods Park; Attendance: 16,922; Referee: Armando Villarreal

August 15 19	Colorado Rapids	2–0	Sporting Kansas City	Commerce City, Colorado
7:30 p.m. MDT	Cannon 65'; Atencio (yellow card) 84'; R. Navarro 90+5'	Report	Bassong (yellow card) 30'; Agyabeng (red card) 38'; Suleymanov (yellow card) 63'; Mosquera (yellow card) 88' (red card) 90+2'	Stadium: Dick's Sporting Goods Park; Attendance: 15,088; Referee: Guido Gonzales Jr.

August 19 20	Colorado Rapids	1–0	Los Angeles FC	Commerce City, Colorado
7:30 p.m. MDT	Ebobisse 22' (o.g.); Maziz (yellow card) 32'; Yapi (yellow card) 56'; Thompson (yellow card) 88'	Report	Cheberko (yellow card) 21'; Segura (yellow card) 40'; Tafari (yellow card) 41'	Stadium: Dick's Sporting Goods Park; Attendance: 15,986; Referee: Joe Dickerson

August 22 21	San Diego FC	3–0	Colorado Rapids	San Diego, California
8:30 p.m. MDT	Valakari 27'; Achouri 35'; Pirani 71'	Report	Cannon (yellow card) 58'; Rosenberry (yellow card) 89'	Stadium: Snapdragon Stadium; Attendance: 21,697; Referee: Pierre-Luc Lauziere

August 29 22	Colorado Rapids	1–0	Real Salt Lake	Commerce City, Colorado
7:30 p.m. MDT	Ojediran (yellow card) 14'; Holding (yellow card) 49'; Cannon 58'; R. Navarro (yellow card) 90+2'	Report	Hezarkhani (yellow card) 53'; Guilavogui (yellow card) 61'; Caliskan (yellow card) 67'; Guske (yellow card) 79'; Arias (yellow card) 89'	Stadium: Dick's Sporting Goods Park; Attendance: 16,094; Referee: Rosendo Mendoza

September 5 23	Columbus Crew	3–0	Colorado Rapids	Columbus, Ohio
5:30 p.m. MDT	Rodríguez 22', (yellow card) 45'; Karumanchi (yellow card) 54'; Lennon (yellow card) 71'; Tapia 81'; Habroune 90+4'; Schulte (yellow card) 90+9'	Report		Stadium: ScottsMiracle-Gro Field; Attendance: 19,144; Referee: Alexis Da Silva

September 9 24	Austin FC	1–1	Colorado Rapids	Austin, Texas
6:30 p.m. MDT	Torres 79'	Report	Aaronson 22'; Atencio (yellow card) 45+4'; Cannon (yellow card) 62'	Stadium: Q2 Stadium; Referee: Sergii Demianchuk

September 12 25	Colorado Rapids	1–0	CF Montréal	Commerce City, Colorado
7:30 p.m. MDT	Aaronson 43' (pen.); Thompson (yellow card) 85'; Frederick (yellow card) 90'	Report	Sealy (yellow card) 81'	Stadium: Dick's Sporting Goods Park; Attendance: 15,091; Referee: Drew Fischer

September 19 26	Colorado Rapids	3–3	Seattle Sounders FC	Commerce City, Colorado
7:30 p.m. MDT	Whittaker 28', 76'; Phillip 55', (yellow card) 69'; Yapi (yellow card) 79'	Report	C. Roldan 49'; Joveljić 79'; Clark 90+3'	Stadium: Dick's Sporting Goods Park; Attendance: 17,092; Referee: Elijio Arreguin

September 26 27	LA Galaxy	3–2	Colorado Rapids	Carson, California
8:30 p.m. MDT	Ruiz (yellow card) 46'; Cannon 54' (o.g.); Klauss 66'; Haak 74'	Report	Phillip 4'; Rosenberry (yellow card) 10'; Holding (yellow card) 31'; Aaronson 39'; Atencio (yellow card) 53'	Stadium: Dignity Health Sports Park; Attendance: 19,452; Referee: Armando Villarreal

October 10 28	Colorado Rapids	1–1	San Jose Earthquakes	Commerce City, Colorado
7:30 p.m. MDT	Phillip 27'; Williams (yellow card) 45+3'	Report	Jasinski (yellow card) 44'; Romney 57'	Stadium: Dick's Sporting Goods Park; Attendance: 15,112; Referee: Filip Dujic

October 14 29	Colorado Rapids	2–2	Minnesota United FC	Commerce City, Colorado
7:30 p.m. MDT	Yapi (yellow card) 11', (goal) 45+1'; Abu Farki (red card) 68'; Minoungou 74'; M. Navarro (yellow card) 79'	Report	Yeboah 52'; Gene (yellow card) 88'	Stadium: Dick's Sporting Goods Park; Attendance: 14,506; Referee: Victor Rivas

October 17 30	Portland Timbers	0–0	Colorado Rapids	Portland, Oregon
8:30 p.m. MDT	Velde (yellow card) 43'	Report	Holding (yellow card) 13'; Whittaker (yellow card) 43'; Thompson (yellow card) 45+2'	Stadium: Providence Park; Attendance: 23,614; Referee: Elijio Arreguin

October 24 31	Colorado Rapids	1–0	Vancouver Whitecaps FC	Commerce City, Colorado
7:30 p.m. MDT	Frederick (yellow card) 21'; Whittaker 81'; Travis (yellow card) 90+4'	Report		Stadium: Dick's Sporting Goods Park; Attendance: 15,605; Referee: Jair Marrufo

October 28 32	San Jose Earthquakes	2–2	Colorado Rapids	San Jose, California
8:30 p.m. MDT	Roberts 15'; Werner (red card) 71'; Judd (yellow card) 82'; Jasinski 83'; Bouda (yellow card) 90+5'	Report	Atencio (yellow card) 22'; Whittaker 26'; Phillip (yellow card) 50'; Williams (yellow card) 62'; Minoungou (yellow card) 65'; Yapi 73'; Thompson (red card) 75'; Abu Farki (yellow card) 90+2'	Stadium: PayPal Park; Attendance: 15,034; Referee: Ramy Touchan

October 31 33	Colorado Rapids	2–4	Chicago Fire FC	Commerce City, Colorado
7:30 p.m. MDT	Whittaker 22'; Navarro (yellow card) 51'; Aaronson 58'; Ojediran (yellow card) 68'; Ku-DiPietro (yellow card) 70'; Holding (yellow card) 90'		Bamba 41', 56'; Allen (yellow card) 45+1'; Lewandowski 74'; Dithejane 88'; Gutman (yellow card) 90+2'	Stadium: Dick's Sporting Goods Park; Attendance: 15,031; Referee: Malik Badawi

November 7 34	FC Dallas	3–1	Colorado Rapids	Frisco, Texas
5:00 p.m. MST	Valiente 75'; Kaick 89'; Moreno 90+3'	Report	Cobb (yellow card) 37'; Whittaker 47'; Thompson (yellow card) 90+5'	Stadium: Toyota Stadium; Attendance: 10,925; Referee: Drew Fischer

=== U.S. Open Cup ===
April 14 Round of 32	Colorado Rapids	1–0	(Nebraska) Union Omaha	Commerce City, Colorado
7:30 p.m. MDT	Sealy 21', (yellow card) 47'; Rosenberry (yellow card) 66'; Hansen (yellow card) 90+1'	Report	Kallman (yellow card) 80'; Borczak (yellow card) 82'; Guediri (yellow card) 84'; Knapp (yellow card) 90+1'	Stadium: Dick's Sporting Goods Park; Referee: Alyssa Pennington

April 29 Round of 16	Colorado Rapids	2–2 (a.e.t.) (5–4 p)	Colorado Springs Switchbacks FC	Commerce City, Colorado
7:00 p.m. MDT	Cannon (yellow card) 17'; Manyoma 25'; Ojediran (yellow card) 27'; Frederick (yellow card) 62'; Thompson (red card) 78'; Yapi (yellow card) 79'; M. Navarro (yellow card) 95'; Minoungou 114', (yellow card) 119'	Report	Masereka (yellow card) 14'; Creek 34'; P. Burner (yellow card) 105+1'; Bennett 120' (pen.)	Stadium: Dick's Sporting Goods Park; Referee: Rosendo Mendoza
	Penalties
	R. Navarro (penalty scored); Holding (penalty scored); Herrington (penalty scored); Sealy (penalty scored); Minoungou (penalty missed); Atencio (penalty missed); Rosenberry (penalty scored)		Bennett (penalty scored); Tejada (penalty scored); Williams (penalty missed); Maples (penalty scored); Magee (penalty scored); Burner (penalty missed); Fjellberg (penalty missed)

May 20 Quarterfinals	Colorado Rapids	2–0	(California) San Jose Earthquakes	Commerce City, Colorado
8:00 p.m. MDT	Yapi 40'; R. Navarro 45+10' (pen.); Hansen (yellow card) 89'; Travis (yellow card) 90'	Report	Vieira (yellow card) 21'; Roberts (yellow card) 36'; Kikanović (yellow card) 53'	Stadium: Dick's Sporting Goods Park; Referee: Fotis Bazakos

September 16 Semifinals	Colorado Rapids	0–3	(Missouri) St. Louis City SC	Commerce City, Colorado
7:30 p.m. MDT	Cannon (yellow card) 43'; Whittaker (yellow card) 44'; Aaronson (yellow card) 58'; Williams (yellow card) 83'	Report	Sang-bin 32'; Polvara (yellow card) 38'; Becher 52'; Mățan 59'; Totland (yellow card) 64'	Stadium: Dick's Sporting Goods Park; Referee: Alexis Da Silva
