= 2015 Desert Diamond Cup =

Tournament details
- Host country: United States
- Dates: February 18 − February 28
- Teams: 6
- Venue: 1 (in 1 host city)

Final positions
- Champions: Real Salt Lake (1st title)
- Runners-up: Colorado Rapids
- Third place: Sporting Kansas City
- Fourth place: Seattle Sounders FC

Tournament statistics
- Matches played: 12
- Goals scored: 37 (3.08 per match)
- Top scorer(s): Devon Sandoval (3 goals)

The 2015 Desert Diamond Cup was a soccer exhibition featuring five soccer teams from Major League Soccer and one from USL Premier Development League, held from February 18 to February 28, 2015. It was the 5th annual Desert Diamond Cup and was won by Real Salt Lake.

== Teams ==
The following six clubs participated in the 2015 tournament:

- Colorado Rapids (second appearance)
- Sporting Kansas City (second appearance)
- New England Revolution (fourth appearance)
- Real Salt Lake (fourth appearance)
- Seattle Sounders FC (second appearance)
- FC Tucson (third appearance)

== Table standings ==
Pos	Team	Pld	W	D	L	GF	GA	GD	Pts
1	Real Salt Lake	3	3	0	0	6	2	+4	9
2	Colorado Rapids	3	1	2	0	4	3	+1	5
3	Sporting Kansas City	3	1	1	1	6	6	0	4
4	New England Revolution	3	1	1	1	3	3	0	4
5	Seattle Sounders FC	3	1	0	2	9	5	+4	3
6	FC Tucson	3	0	0	3	1	10	−9	0

== Matches ==
The tournament will feature a round-robin group stage followed by fifth-place, third-place and championship matches.

=== Tournament ===
February 18 Game 1	Colorado Rapids	2–2	Sporting Kansas City	Tucson, Arizona
17:30 MST	Torres 12'; Badji 17'; Marcelo (yellow card) 29'; Flores (yellow card) 56' (red card) 75'; Cronin (yellow card) 64'	Report	Dwyer (yellow card) 23'; Nagamura (yellow card) 25'; Espinoza (yellow card) 32'; Németh 77' (pen.); Añor 78'	Stadium: Kino North Stadium; Referee: Jair Marrufo

February 18 Game 2	Real Salt Lake	1–0	New England Revolution	Tucson, Arizona
18:00 MST	Sandoval 6' (pen.); Mansally (yellow card) 50'	Report	Barnes (yellow card) 16'	Stadium: Kino North Grandstand

February 18 Game 3	Seattle Sounders FC	6–0	FC Tucson	Tucson, Arizona
20:00 MST	Neagle 4', 27'; Dempsey 11', 37'; Mears (yellow card) 31'; Parsemain 88', 89'	Report		Stadium: Kino North Stadium; Attendance: 1,856; Referee: Kevin Stott

February 21 Game 4	Colorado Rapids	1–1	New England Revolution	Tucson, Arizona
17:30 MST	Sjöberg (yellow card) 25'; Torres 48'; LaBrocca (yellow card) 83'	Report	Dorman (yellow card) 24'; Alston (yellow card) 36'; Fagúndez 54'	Stadium: Kino North Stadium; Referee: Daniel Radford

February 21 Game 5	Real Salt Lake	3–1	FC Tucson	Tucson, Arizona
18:00 MST	Saborío 41', 58'; Sandoval 68'	Report	Papa 48'	Stadium: Kino North Grandstand

February 21 Game 6	Seattle Sounders FC	2–3	Sporting Kansas City	Tucson, Arizona
20:00 MST	Pineda (yellow card) 22'; Mansaray 74'; Cooper 81'	Report	Németh (yellow card) 25', (goal) 39'; Besler (yellow card) 27'; Zusi 34'; Añor (yellow card) 42'; Sinovic (yellow card) 67'; Rogers 73'; Lopez (yellow card) 88'	Stadium: Kino North Stadium; Attendance: 3,661

February 25 Game 7	Colorado Rapids	1–0	FC Tucson	Tucson, Arizona
17:30 MST	Sjöberg 80'	Report	Harb (yellow card) 26'; Boggs (yellow card) 34'	Stadium: Kino North Stadium

February 25 Game 8	New England Revolution	2–1	Seattle Sounders FC	Tucson, Arizona
18:00 MST	Fagundez (yellow card) 44'; Lowe 47' (o.g.); Rudy (red card) 60'; Davies 90+' (pen.)	Report; Report	Cooper 4'; Jones (yellow card) 42'; Roldan (yellow card) 59'; Lowe (yellow card) 74'	Stadium: Kino North Grandstand

February 25 Game 9	Sporting Kansas City	1–2	Real Salt Lake	Tucson, Arizona
20:00 MST	Medranda (yellow card) 43'; Sinovic (yellow card) 59'; Dwyer 66'; Németh (yellow card) 72'; Añor (yellow card) 83'	Report	Welshman 12' (yellow card) 59'; Ovalle (yellow card) 38'; Sandoval 47'; Velazco (yellow card) 85'	Stadium: Kino North Stadium; Attendance: 1,768

=== Finals ===
February 28 Game 10	New England Revolution	3–0	FC Tucson	Tucson, Arizona
16:30 MST	Bunbury 30'; Gonçalves (yellow card) 39'; Rowe 46'; Okoli 90+'	Report		Stadium: Kino North Stadium; Referee: Fotis Bazakos

February 28 Game 11	Sporting Kansas City	1–1	Seattle Sounders FC	Tucson, Arizona
17:00 MST	Hallisey 8' (yellow card) 36'	Report	Azira (yellow card) 12'; Neagle (yellow card) 50'; Martins 60'; Pineda (red card) 76'	Stadium: Kino North Grandstand

February 28 Game 12	Real Salt Lake	2–1	Colorado Rapids	Tucson, Arizona
19:00 MST	Garcia 8'; Saborío (yellow card) 13' (red card) 50'; Beckerman (yellow card) 16'; Morales 51'	Report	Serna 28'; Burling (yellow card) 41'; Torres (yellow card) 55'	Stadium: Kino North Stadium; Attendance: 3,692

== Goalscorers ==
=== Top scorers ===
Rank	Player	Nation	Club	Goals
1	Devon Sandoval	USA	Real Salt Lake	3
2	Gabriel Torres	PAN	Colorado Rapids	2
2	Álvaro Saborío	CRC	Real Salt Lake	2
2	Clint Dempsey	USA	Seattle Sounders FC	2
2	Lamar Neagle	USA	Seattle Sounders FC	2
2	Kévin Parsemain	MTQ	Seattle Sounders FC	2
2	Kenny Cooper	USA	Seattle Sounders FC	2
2	Krisztián Németh	HUN	Sporting Kansas City	2
9	Dominique Badji	SEN	Colorado Rapids	1
9	Axel Sjöberg	SWE	Colorado Rapids	1
9	Dominic Papa	USA	FC Tucson	1
9	Diego Fagúndez	URU	New England Revolution	1
9	Charlie Davies	USA	New England Revolution	1
9	Emery Welshman	GUY	Real Salt Lake	1
9	Victor Mansaray	USA	Seattle Sounders FC	1
9	Bernardo Añor	VEN	Sporting Kansas City	1
9	James Rogers	USA	Sporting Kansas City	1
9	Graham Zusi	USA	Sporting Kansas City	1
9	Dom Dwyer	ENG	Sporting Kansas City	1
