= Lucas Pittinari =

Argentine footballer

Personal information
- Full name: Lucas Abel Pittinari
- Date of birth: November 30, 1991 (age 34)
- Place of birth: Laborde, Córdoba, Argentina
- Height: 1.78 m (5 ft 10 in)
- Position: Defensive midfielder

Team information
- Current team: Temperley

Youth career
- 2007–2009: Belgrano

Senior career*
Years	Team	Apps	(Gls)
2009–2017	Belgrano	67	(2)
2015	→ Colorado Rapids (loan)	29	(1)
2016	→ Tigre (loan)	7	(0)
2016–2017	→ Atlético de Rafaela (loan)	23	(0)
2017–2018	Atlético de Rafaela	20	(3)
2018	Deportes La Serena		
2020	Tabor Sežana	4	(0)
2021–	Temperley	37	(2)
- * Club domestic league appearances and goals as of 18:02, 3 August 2022 (UTC)

Lucas Pittinari (born 30 November 1991) is an Argentine footballer, who plays as a defensive midfielder for Temperley.

== Career ==
Lucas Pittinari began his career in the youth system of Belgrano in 2007. He made his first team debut on 2 October 2010 in a 3–0 victory over Independiente Rivadavia and was a member of the squad that gained promotion to the Argentine Primera División in 2011. On 16 September 2012 Pittinari scored his first goal for Belgrano in a 2–0 victory over Arsenal de Sarandi.

In January 2015, Pittinari joined the Major League Soccer club Colorado Rapids on a season-long loan, with a $1.5 million option to buy. In February 2020, Pittinari signed for Slovenian top division side Tabor Sežana.

Pittinari returned to Argentina after the spell in Slovenia, and joined Temperley in March 2021.
