= Rocky Mountain Cup =

Annual soccer trophy awarded by fans

- Teams: Colorado Rapids; Real Salt Lake
- First meeting: April 16, 2005; MLS regular season RSL 1–0 COL
- Latest meeting: August 29, 2026; MLS regular season COL 1–0 RSL
- Next meeting: March 6, 2027; MLS regular season COL v RSL
- Stadiums: America First Field; Dick's Sporting Goods Park

Statistics
- Total meetings: 69
- All-time series: RSL 34–13–22 COL
- Largest victory: COL 0–6 RSL; MLS regular season (August 25, 2018)

The Rocky Mountain Cup is a soccer trophy contested between Real Salt Lake and the Colorado Rapids. The cup is awarded by the Committee of 10, a group of bi-partisan fans who run the competition, to the team with the most points in games played between the two. The teams are awarded 3 points for each win and 1 point for each tie in regular season MLS games against each other. The Cup is awarded at the conclusion of the deciding game of the series between the two teams.

If the teams end the season in a points tie, the team with the most goals on aggregate will win (for a two-team competition, this is equivalent to goal differential). If the teams are tied on aggregate goals, the current holders retain the Cup for another year.

The cup was created in 2005, the first year of play for Real Salt Lake.

== History ==
When it was officially announced that Salt Lake City would be awarded an MLS expansion club, fans from Utah and Colorado founded the bi-partisan Committee of 10 (5 supporters from each club) and began to outline the official rules of the competition. The contest was named the Rocky Mountain Cup after a vote from the fans, and a trophy was acquired.

The Rocky Mountain Cup began on April 16, 2005 at Real Salt Lake's inaugural home game, in which Real earned their first-ever win with a 1–0 victory. Colorado eventually won the trophy in 2005 after besting Real in the three subsequent matches that season, officially clinching the Cup at their final meeting of the year at Rice-Eccles Stadium.

Prior to the 2006 MLS season, the two clubs swapped players in a trade, exchanging forward Jeff Cunningham and midfielder Clint Mathis. The repercussions of the trade surfaced in an August 10 match in which RSL humiliated Colorado 4–1 at INVESCO Field, punctuated by a stellar performance by Cunningham in which he earned two goals and an assist.

The Rapids would have their revenge later that year during a very heated match in Salt Lake City on September 2. The affair saw numerous hard fouls and seven yellow cards. Fans showered the field with debris and missiles throughout the game. Colorado would grind out a 1–0 victory and secure the Rocky Mountain Cup for the second consecutive year. A myriad of controversy erupted after the game as the Rapids celebrated with the trophy. Rapids captain Pablo Mastroeni removed his shirt, stuffed it down his shorts, and began making gestures at the Salt Lake fans. RSL owner Dave Checketts then came on to the field and confronted Mastroeni in an angry verbal exchange which was later broken up by players and officials. Much to the ire of Real fans, the League did not take action for Mastroeni's controversial behavior.

The 2007 competition kicked off with the Rapids earning a comfortable 2–0 win on the road. After the match, Colorado midfielder Kyle Beckerman made remarks towards RSL supporters and their reaction towards the controversy of the previous September: "It definitely comes from their fans. They run their mouths the whole game. If they don't want us to celebrate, win the game."

The next meeting between the teams, a 1-1 draw on May 10, finished with a bizarre distinction of being the only draw in MLS history in which only own goals were scored. Later that year, on July 16, the two clubs exchanged Kyle Beckerman and Mehdi Ballouchy. This trade proved particularly controversial for Rapids supports and further deteriorated their relationship with Colorado head coach Fernando Clavijo.

Real Salt Lake would then even the 2007 series in September, forcing the deciding match in Colorado a month later on the final game of the season. Both teams were all but mathematically ruled out of the MLS Cup Playoffs, leaving the October 20 contest largely a match for pride. The Rapids needed only a draw to secure the cup for a third year, but Real grabbed a late win when Robbie Findley scored in the 87th minute. The victory for Real Salt Lake won the club their first Rocky Mountain Cup, and also brought a painful end to one of Colorado's worst-ever seasons.

2008 would play out in similar fashion to the previous year. The deciding match was again at Dick's Sporting Goods Park on the final day of the season. However, the stakes were higher, with a win for either side guaranteeing a playoff spot along with the Rocky Mountain Cup (Real could also prevail with a draw). Colorado pulled ahead and held a 1–0 lead into the closing seconds of the game, but Yura Movsisyan scored a clutch stoppage-time goal to end the game with a 1–1 draw. The result was quite possibly RSL's greatest moment in club history: retaining the Cup for a second year, clinching their first-ever postseason berth, and denying Rapids of the playoffs on their own turf. Salt Lake fans celebrated by throwing a number of smoke bombs onto the pitch after the final whistle, adding insult to injury for the stunned Colorado supporters.

The 2010 edition of the Rocky Mountain Cup played out as close and exciting as the previous three seasons. In the first leg, held September 27 at RSL's Rio Tinto Stadium, Real Salt Lake fielded a squad of mostly reserves in the middle of a busy stretch of their schedule including 2010–11 CONCACAF Champions League group stage matches. Coach Jason Kreis rested most of the starters in anticipation of an opportunity to clinch a berth in the CCL knockout round three days later. Conor Casey gave Colorado a 1–0 lead in the 36th minute. The result looked like it would hold until former Rapids defender Nat Borchers headed in a service from Andy Williams in the 93rd minute for the 1–1 draw. The second leg would finish in an even more exciting fashion. The teams returned to Dick's Sporting Goods Park for the final match of the regular season on October 23. Both teams had already clinched playoff spots. RSL needed a win or tie to have a chance at winning the Supporters' Shield. Colorado appeared to dash those hopes with a 16th-minute goal by Omar Cummings and a 51st-minute header by Conor Casey. Rapids fans were ready to celebrate their first Rocky Mountain Cup in 4 years while carrying a 2–0 lead into stoppage time. RSL forward Alvaro Saborio scored twice in stoppage time – first on a blocked clearance from Colorado keeper Matt Pickens in the 91st minute, and second on a penalty in the 95th minute after Drew Moor pulled RSL defender Jamison Olave down in the box on an RSL free kick. The resulting 2–2 draw gave RSL the Rocky Mountain Cup for the 4th consecutive season due to being the previous year's winner. Conditions after the match became ugly when several RSL players made obscene gestures towards the Colorado supporters' terrace and were consequently showered with beer cups and other projectiles. The draw would prove to be beneficial for Colorado, as it put them in the easier Eastern Conference bracket for the 2010 MLS Cup Playoffs in which Colorado won its first ever MLS Cup.

== Winners ==
Tiebreakers: 1. goal differential; 2. away goals (prior to 2008, when teams played an equal number of home games; never used); 3. holders retain cup.

Year	Winner	Points	Loser	Notes	Series
2005	Colorado Rapids	9–3	Real Salt Lake		COL 1–0
2006	Colorado Rapids	7–4	Real Salt Lake		COL 2–0
2007	Real Salt Lake	7–4	Colorado Rapids		COL 2–1
2008	Real Salt Lake	4–4	Colorado Rapids	RSL retained as holders	Tied 2–2
2009	Real Salt Lake	4–4	Colorado Rapids	RSL won on goal differential	RSL 3–2
2010	Real Salt Lake	2–2	Colorado Rapids	RSL retained as holders	RSL 4–2
2011	Real Salt Lake	4–1	Colorado Rapids		RSL 5–2
2012	Real Salt Lake	6–3	Colorado Rapids		RSL 6–2
2013	Colorado Rapids	5–2	Real Salt Lake		RSL 6–3
2014	Real Salt Lake	9–0	Colorado Rapids		RSL 7–3
2015	Colorado Rapids	4–4	Real Salt Lake	Rapids won on goal differential	RSL 7–4
2016	Real Salt Lake	6–3	Colorado Rapids		RSL 8–4
2017	Real Salt Lake	6–3	Colorado Rapids		RSL 9–4
2018	Real Salt Lake	7–1	Colorado Rapids		RSL 10–4
2019	Real Salt Lake	6–0	Colorado Rapids		RSL 11–4
2020	Colorado Rapids	3–3	Real Salt Lake	Rapids won on goal differential as MLS is Back Tournament game was not counted	RSL 11–5
2021	Real Salt Lake	6–3	Colorado Rapids		RSL 12–5
2022	Real Salt Lake	2–2	Colorado Rapids	RSL retained as holders	RSL 13–5
2023	Real Salt Lake	9–0	Colorado Rapids		RSL 14–5
2024	Colorado Rapids	6–3	Real Salt Lake		RSL 14–6
2025	Colorado Rapids	3–3	Real Salt Lake	COL retained as holders	RSL 14–7
2026	Colorado Rapids	3–3	Real Salt Lake	COL retained as holders	RSL 14–8

== Series results ==
=== League matches ===
No.	Date	Venue	Home team	Away team	Score	Series leader (W–L–T)
1	April 16, 2005	Rice-Eccles Stadium, Salt Lake City	Real Salt Lake	Colorado Rapids	1–0	RSL 1–0
2	September 21, 2005	Invesco Field at Mile High, Denver	Colorado Rapids	Real Salt Lake	2–0	Tied 1–1
3	October 1, 2005	Invesco Field at Mile High	Colorado Rapids	Real Salt Lake	2–1	COL 2–1
4	October 12, 2005	Rice-Eccles Stadium	Real Salt Lake	Colorado Rapids	0–1	COL 3–1
5	May 27, 2006	Rice-Eccles Stadium	Real Salt Lake	Colorado Rapids	2–2	COL 3–1–1
6	June 9, 2006	Invesco Field at Mile High	Colorado Rapids	Real Salt Lake	1–0	COL 4–1–1
7	August 9, 2006	Invesco Field at Mile High	Colorado Rapids	Real Salt Lake	1–4	COL 4–2–1
8	September 2, 2006	Rice-Eccles Stadium	Real Salt Lake	Colorado Rapids	0–1	COL 5–2–1
9	April 30, 2007	Rice-Eccles Stadium	Real Salt Lake	Colorado Rapids	0–2	COL 6–2–1
10	May 10, 2007	Dick's Sporting Goods Park, Commerce City	Colorado Rapids	Real Salt Lake	1–1	COL 6–2–2
11	September 22, 2007	Rice-Eccles Stadium	Real Salt Lake	Colorado Rapids	1–0	COL 6–3–2
12	October 20, 2007	Dick's Sporting Goods Park	Colorado Rapids	Real Salt Lake	0–1	COL 6–4–2
13	May 15, 2008	Dick's Sporting Goods Park	Colorado Rapids	Real Salt Lake	2–0	COL 7–4–2
14	August 29, 2008	Rice-Eccles Stadium	Real Salt Lake	Colorado Rapids	2–0	COL 7–5–2
15	October 25, 2008	Dick's Sporting Goods Park	Colorado Rapids	Real Salt Lake	1–1	COL 7–5–3
16	May 2, 2009	Dick's Sporting Goods Park	Colorado Rapids	Real Salt Lake	2–0	COL 8–5–3
17	June 6, 2009	Rio Tinto Stadium, Sandy	Real Salt Lake	Colorado Rapids	1–1	COL 8–5–4
18	October 24, 2009	Rio Tinto Stadium	Real Salt Lake	Colorado Rapids	3–0	COL 8–6–4
19	September 25, 2010	Rio Tinto Stadium	Real Salt Lake	Colorado Rapids	1–1	COL 8–6–5
20	October 23, 2010	Dick's Sporting Goods Park	Colorado Rapids	Real Salt Lake	2–2	COL 8–6–6
21	April 13, 2011	Rio Tinto Stadium	Real Salt Lake	Colorado Rapids	1–0	COL 8–7–6
22	October 14, 2011	Dick's Sporting Goods Park	Colorado Rapids	Real Salt Lake	0–0	COL 8–7–7
23	April 7, 2012	Rio Tinto Stadium	Real Salt Lake	Colorado Rapids	2–0	Tied 8–8–7
24	July 21, 2012	Rio Tinto Stadium	Real Salt Lake	Colorado Rapids	2–0	RSL 9–8–7
25	August 4, 2012	Dick's Sporting Goods Park	Colorado Rapids	Real Salt Lake	1–0	Tied 9–9–7
26	March 16, 2013	Rio Tinto Stadium	Real Salt Lake	Colorado Rapids	1–1	Tied 9–9–8
27	April 6, 2013	Dick's Sporting Goods Park	Colorado Rapids	Real Salt Lake	1–0	COL 10–9–8
28	August 3, 2013	Dick's Sporting Goods Park	Colorado Rapids	Real Salt Lake	2–2	COL 10–9–9
29	May 17, 2014	Rio Tinto Stadium	Real Salt Lake	Colorado Rapids	2–1	Tied 10–10–9
30	August 2, 2014	Dick's Sporting Goods Park	Colorado Rapids	Real Salt Lake	0–1	RSL 11–10–9
31	September 19, 2014	Rio Tinto Stadium	Real Salt Lake	Colorado Rapids	5–1	RSL 12–10–9
32	June 7, 2015	Rio Tinto Stadium	Real Salt Lake	Colorado Rapids	0–0	RSL 12–10–10
33	July 11, 2015	Dick's Sporting Goods Park	Colorado Rapids	Real Salt Lake	3–1	RSL 12–11–10
34	October 4, 2015	Dick's Sporting Goods Park	Colorado Rapids	Real Salt Lake	1–2	RSL 13–11–10
35	April 9, 2016	Rio Tinto Stadium	Real Salt Lake	Colorado Rapids	1–0	RSL 14–11–10
36	May 7, 2016	Dick's Sporting Goods Park	Colorado Rapids	Real Salt Lake	1–0	RSL 14–12–10
37	August 26, 2016	Rio Tinto Stadium	Real Salt Lake	Colorado Rapids	2–1	RSL 15–12–10
38	April 15, 2017	Dick's Sporting Goods Park	Colorado Rapids	Real Salt Lake	1–2	RSL 16–12–10
39	August 26, 2017	Rio Tinto Stadium	Real Salt Lake	Colorado Rapids	4–1	RSL 17–12–10
40	October 15, 2017	Dick's Sporting Goods Park	Colorado Rapids	Real Salt Lake	1–0	RSL 17–13–10
41	April 21, 2018	Rio Tinto Stadium	Real Salt Lake	Colorado Rapids	3–0	RSL 18–13–10
42	July 21, 2018	Rio Tinto Stadium	Real Salt Lake	Colorado Rapids	2–2	RSL 18–13–11
43	August 25, 2018	Dick's Sporting Goods Park	Colorado Rapids	Real Salt Lake	0–6	RSL 19–13–11
44	May 11, 2019	Dick's Sporting Goods Park	Colorado Rapids	Real Salt Lake	2–3	RSL 20–13–11
45	August 24, 2019	Rio Tinto Stadium	Real Salt Lake	Colorado Rapids	2–0	RSL 21–13–11
46	July 12, 2020*	ESPN Wide World of Sports Complex*	Real Salt Lake	Colorado Rapids	2–0	RSL 22–13–11
47	August 22, 2020	Dick's Sporting Goods Park	Colorado Rapids	Real Salt Lake	1–4	RSL 23–13–11
48	September 12, 2020	Rio Tinto Stadium	Real Salt Lake	Colorado Rapids	0–5	RSL 23–14–11
49	July 24, 2021	Rio Tinto Stadium	Real Salt Lake	Colorado Rapids	3–0	RSL 24–14–11
50	August 21, 2021	Dick's Sporting Goods Park	Colorado Rapids	Real Salt Lake	2–1	RSL 24–15–11
51	October 16, 2021	Rio Tinto Stadium	Real Salt Lake	Colorado Rapids	3-1	RSL 25–15–11
52	April 2, 2022	Dick's Sporting Goods Park	Colorado Rapids	Real Salt Lake	1–1	RSL 25–15–12
53	July 9, 2022	Rio Tinto Stadium	Real Salt Lake	Colorado Rapids	2–2	RSL 25–15–13
54	May 20, 2023	Dick's Sporting Goods Park	Colorado Rapids	Real Salt Lake	2–3	RSL 26–15–13
55	September 2, 2023	America First Field	Real Salt Lake	Colorado Rapids	2–0	RSL 27–15–13
56	October 21, 2023	Dick's Sporting Goods Park	Colorado Rapids	Real Salt Lake	0–1	RSL 28–15–13
57	March 9, 2024	America First Field	Real Salt Lake	Colorado Rapids	1–2	RSL 28–16–13
58	May 18, 2024	America First Field	Real Salt Lake	Colorado Rapids	5–3	RSL 29–16–13
59	July 20, 2024	Dick's Sporting Goods Park	Colorado Rapids	Real Salt Lake	3–2	RSL 29–17–13
60	May 17, 2025	Dick's Sporting Goods Park	Colorado Rapids	Real Salt Lake	1–0	RSL 29–18–13
61	October 4, 2025	America First Field	Real Salt Lake	Colorado Rapids	1–0	RSL 30–18–13
62	May 16, 2026	America First Field	Real Salt Lake	Colorado Rapids	2–1	RSL 31–18–13
63	August 29, 2026	Dick's Sporting Goods Park	Colorado Rapids	Real Salt Lake	1–0	RSL 31–19–13

- The MLS is Back Tournament game was announced as not being part of the competition by the Committee of 10, the competition organizers.

=== Playoff matches ===
The two sides have yet to meet in the MLS Cup playoffs.

=== Open Cup matches ===
Date	Round	Venue	Home team	Away team	Score	Series leader (W–L–T)
August 2, 2006	Fourth round	Rice-Eccles Stadium	Real Salt Lake	Colorado Rapids	0–1	COL 1–0–0
May 23, 2007	Qualification	Dick's Sporting Goods Park	Colorado Rapids	Real Salt Lake	2–1	COL 2–0–0
May 24, 2023	Round of 16	Dick's Sporting Goods Park	Colorado Rapids	Real Salt Lake	0–1	COL 2–1–0

=== Continental matches ===
The two sides have yet to meet in the CONCACAF Champions Cup or Leagues Cup.

=== Friendly matches ===
Date	Event	Venue	Home team	Away team	Score	Series leader (W–L–T)
February 22, 2014	Desert Diamond Cup	Kino North Stadium, Tucson	Colorado Rapids	Real Salt Lake	1–0	COL 1–0–0
February 28, 2015	Desert Diamond Cup	Kino North Stadium, Tucson	Real Salt Lake	Colorado Rapids	2–1	Tied 1–1–0
April 3, 2021	Visit Tucson Sun Cup	Kino North Stadium, Tucson	Real Salt Lake	Colorado Rapids	3–0	RSL 2–1–0

== Player statistics ==
=== Regular season ===
Legend
Active player for Colorado Rapids
Active player for Real Salt Lake

- Only MLS regular season matches played between Colorado Rapids and Real Salt Lake counted towards records.
- Own goals are not counted
- If players are tied for a stat, the player who has most recently accomplished the stat is listed first.

As of October 4, 2025

Goals
Rank	Player	Nation	Club	Goals
1	Joao Plata	(Ecuador)	RSL	9
2	Yura Movsisyan	(Armenia)	RSL	5
2	Álvaro Saborío	(Costa Rica)	RSL	5
4	Cole Bassett	(United States)	COL	4
4	Andrés Gómez	(Colombia)	RSL	4
4	Diego Rubio	(Chile)	COL	4
4	Jefferson Savarino	(Venezuela)	RSL	4
4	Fabian Espindola	(Argentina)	RSL	4
4	Jeff Cunningham	(Jamaica)	COL/RSL	4
10	Cristian Arango	(Colombia)	RSL	3
10	Damir Kreilach	(Croatia)	RSL	3
10	Corey Baird	(United States)	RSL	3
10	Javier Morales	(Argentina)	RSL	3
10	Conor Casey	(United States)	COL	3
10	Robbie Findley	(United States)	RSL	3

Shutouts
Rank	Player	Nation	Club	Shutouts
1	Nick Rimando	(United States)	RSL	14
2	Matt Pickens	(United States)	COL	3
2	Joe Cannon	(United States)	COL	3
4	Zac MacMath	(United States)	COL/RSL	2
4	Clint Irwin	(United States)	COL	2
4	Bouna Coundoul	(Senegal)	COL	2
7	Adam Beaudry	(United States)	COL	1
7	Rafael Cabral	(Brazil)	RSL	1
7	Nicolas Hansen	(United States)	COL	1
7	David Ochoa	(Mexico)	RSL	1
7	William Yarbrough	(United States)	COL	1
7	Tim Howard	(United States)	COL	1
7	Byron Foss	(United States)	COL	1
7	D. J. Countess	(United States)	RSL	1

== Crossing the Continental Divide ==
Despite the fierce rivalry between the two clubs, some players have played for both clubs during their careers, with direct transfers occurring on occasion. As of the 2024 season, 12 players have played for both teams in the Rocky Mountain Cup:

Nation	Player	Position	Colorado years	RSL years	Notes
(Morocco)	Mehdi Ballouchy	Midfielder	2007–2010	2006–2007	Trade (RSL-COL)
(United States)	Kyle Beckerman	Midfielder	2002–2007	2007–2020	Trade (COL-RSL)
(United States)	Nat Borchers	Defender	2003–2005	2008–2014	
(Jamaica)	Jeff Cunningham	Forward	2005	2006–2007	Trade (COL-RSL)
(United States)	Luis Gil	Midfielder	2017	2007–2015	
(Saint Kitts and Nevis)	Atiba Harris	Midfielder	2013	2006–2007	
(United States)	Richie Kotschau	Defender	2001–2005	2007–2008	
(Germany)	Jasper Löffelsend	Midfielder	2024	2022–2023	Trade (RSL-COL)
(United States)	Zac MacMath	Goalkeeper	2015–2018	2020–2025	
(United States)	Clint Mathis	Forward	2006	2005; 2008–2009	Trade (RSL-COL)
(United States)	Collen Warner	Midfielder	2020–2022	2010–2011	
(United States)	Chris Wingert	Defender	2006–2007	2007–2014; 2016–2017	Trade (COL-RSL)

In addition, two managers have played notable roles at both clubs:

Nation	Coach	Colorado position	Colorado years	RSL position	RSL years	Notes
(United States)	Robin Fraser	Head coach	2019–2023	Assistant coach	2007–2011	
(United States)	Pablo Mastroeni	Head coach	2014–2017	Head coach	2021–present	

== The Committee of 10 ==
The Committee of 10, or C10, was initially formed through discussions between fans from both Real Salt Lake and the Colorado Rapids on BigSoccer.com and on the now defunct fan forums at RealSaltLake.org. It was decided that each team's fans would be represented by five individuals per side. These representatives would be responsible for creating the guidelines, design, and ultimately raising the funds to create the Rocky Mountain Cup.

The Original Committee of 10

Real Salt Lake	Colorado Rapids
Gary Hadley	Mark Bodmer
Juliana Montgomery	Bill Fisher
Eric Salsbery	Jason Greene
Glenn Webb	Jason Maxwell*
Neil Wyler	Jeremy Vanderlan

- = Original Chairman

== See also ==
- Jazz–Nuggets rivalry
- Rumble in the Rockies (Colorado Buffaloes–Utah Utes rivalry)
