= Dillon Serna =

American soccer player

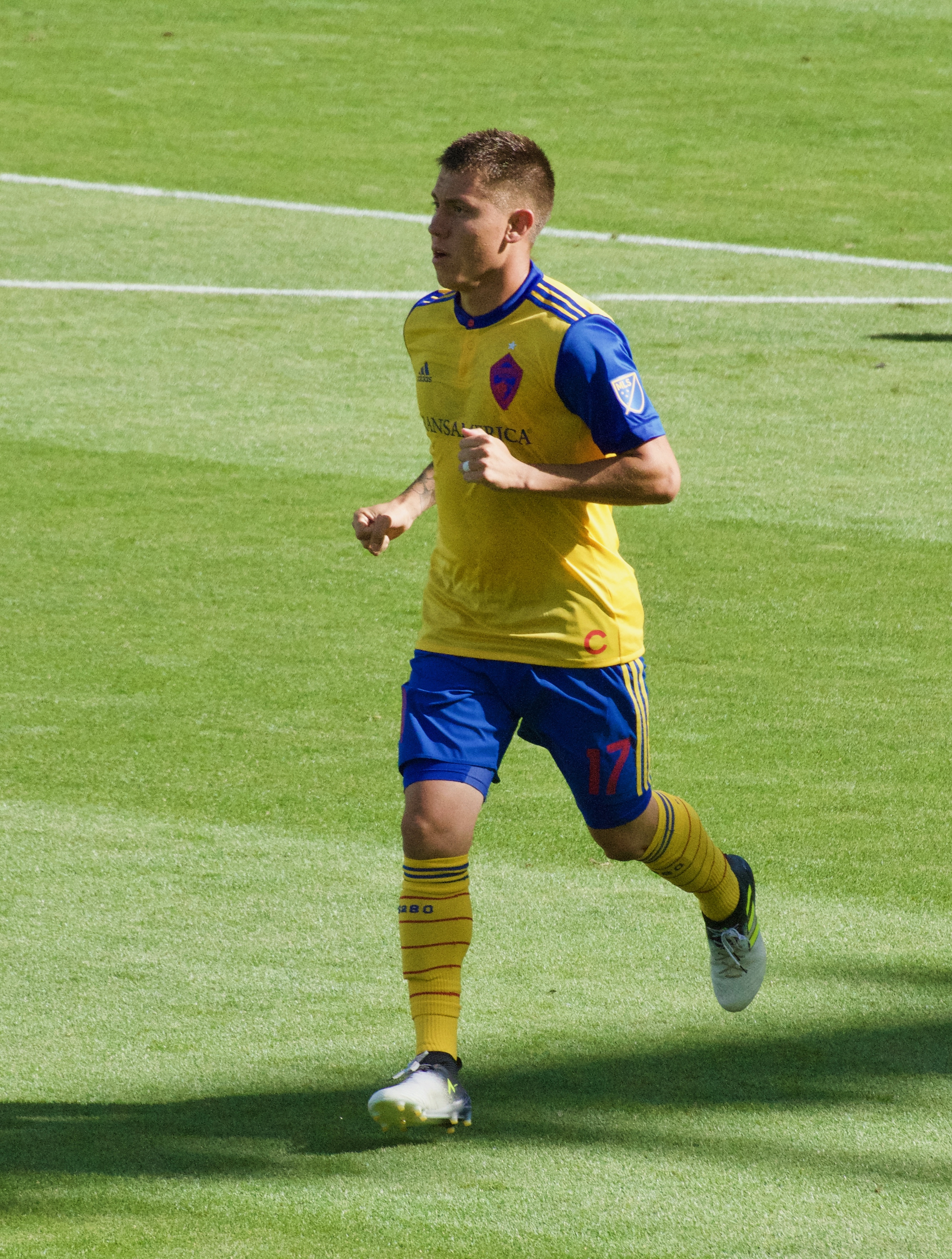

Personal information
- Full name: Dillon Paul Serna
- Date of birth: March 25, 1994 (age 32)
- Place of birth: Thornton, Colorado, United States
- Height: 5 ft 7 in (1.70 m)
- Positions: Midfielder; defender

Youth career
- 2009–2012: Colorado Rapids

College career
Years	Team	Apps	(Gls)
2012	Akron Zips	22	(2)

Senior career*
Years	Team	Apps	(Gls)
2013–2019	Colorado Rapids	105	(9)
2020	Sporting Kansas City II	15	(0)
2021	Colorado Springs Switchbacks	7	(0)
2022–2023	Colorado Rapids 2	20	(1)

International career^{‡}
2011	United States U17	4	(1)
2012–2013	United States U20	9	(0)
2014–2016	United States U23	14	(0)
Medal record
Representing United States
Runner-up	CONCACAF U-20 Championship	2013
- * Club domestic league appearances and goals as of January 12, 2024 ‡ National team caps and goals as of January 30, 2018

Dillon Paul Serna (born March 25, 1994) is an American former professional soccer player who played as a midfielder. He spent most of his career in Major League Soccer for Colorado Rapids and in the USL Championship for Sporting Kansas City II and Colorado Springs Switchbacks.

== Career ==
=== Club ===
Serna joined the U.S. Soccer Development Academy with the Rapids' academy in 2009. After graduating from high school, he played one year of college soccer for the University of Akron, scoring two goals and contributing eight assists. He signed with the Rapids as a homegrown player in January 2013.

Serna made his MLS debut in a 3–0 loss to Vancouver Whitecaps FC in the 2013 regular season finale.

Serna scored his first professional and his first MLS goal on April 26, 2014, in a 4–1 loss to Seattle Sounders FC.

On November 21, 2019, the Rapids announced that Serna was out of contract with the club, but did not announce that they were working on a new contract. Serna was included on Seattle Sounders FC 2020 preseason training roster as an unsigned player.

On February 28, 2020, the MLS veteran signed with USL Championship side Sporting Kansas City II.

Serna signed with USL Championship side Colorado Springs Switchbacks on January 28, 2021. His contract option wasn't picked up by the Switchbacks following the 2021 season.

On April 10, 2024, Serna announced his retirement from playing professional soccer.

=== International ===
Serna was selected by coach Wilmer Cabrera to be part of the United States U-17 squad for the 2011 FIFA U-17 World Cup. During the tournament, Serna did not feature in any of the four matches the United States played. Serna played in several matches with the United States U-20 team, but he was not part of the final squad that Tab Ramos selected to the 2013 FIFA U-20 World Cup.

He was called up to the United States senior squad for a friendly against Panama in February 2015.

== Career statistics ==
As of November 5, 2020

Club	Season	League			Cup (Note: All appearances in the U.S. Open Cup)		Continental		Other		Total	
Club	Season	Division	Apps	Goals	Apps	Goals	Apps	Goals	Apps	Goals	Apps	Goals
Colorado Rapids	2013	MLS	1	0	0	0	–		0	0	1	0
Colorado Rapids	2014	MLS	27	3	2	0	–		–		29	3
Colorado Rapids	2015	MLS	15	3	1	2	–		–		16	5
Colorado Rapids	2016	MLS	9	1	2	1	–		0	0	11	2
Colorado Rapids	2017	MLS	19	1	1	0	–		–		20	1
Colorado Rapids	2018	MLS	20	1	1	0	0	0	–		21	1
Colorado Rapids	2019	MLS	14	0	1	0	–		0	0	15	0
Colorado Rapids	Total		105	9	8	3	0	0	0	0	113	12
Sporting Kansas City II	2020	USL Championship	15	0	–		–		0	0	15	0
Career total			120	9	8	3	0	0	0	0	128	12

== Honors ==
=== Individual ===
- Mid-American Conference Men's Soccer Newcomer of the Year: 2012
