= Adam Beaudry =

American soccer player (born 2006)

Personal information
- Full name: Adam James Beaudry
- Date of birth: April 18, 2006 (age 20)
- Place of birth: O'Fallon, Missouri, U.S.
- Height: 1.88 m (6 ft 2 in)
- Position: Goalkeeper

Team information
- Current team: Colorado Rapids

Youth career
- –2021: Real Colorado
- 2022: Colorado Rapids

Senior career*
Years	Team	Apps	(Gls)
2022–	Colorado Rapids 2	36	(0)
2024–	Colorado Rapids	3	(0)
2025	→ Switchbacks FC (loan)	7	(0)
2026	→ Loudoun United (loan)	7	(0)

International career^{‡}
2023	United States U17	10	(0)
2024	United States U19	3	(0)
2024–	United States U20	8	(0)
- * Club domestic league appearances and goals as of August 30, 2026 ‡ National team caps and goals as of October 2, 2025

Adam James Beaudry (born April 18, 2006) is an American soccer player who plays as a goalkeeper for Major League Soccer club Colorado Rapids.

== Early life ==
Beaudry was born on April 18, 2006. Born in O'Fallon, Missouri, United States, he started playing soccer at the age of four and is the son of a goalkeeper father. Beaudry grew up in Castle Pines, Colorado.

== Club career ==
As a youth player, Beaudry joined the youth academy of Real Colorado. Following his stint there, he joined the youth academy of Colorado Rapids in 2022 and was promoted to the club's senior team ahead of the 2024 season.

Subsequently, he was sent on loan to Colorado Springs Switchbacks FC in 2025, where he made six league appearances.

In February 2026, Loudoun United FC announced they had acquired Beaudry on loan for the 2026 USL Championship season.

== International career ==
Beaudry is a United States youth international. During the autumn of 2025, he played for the United States men's national under-20 soccer team at the 2025 FIFA U-20 World Cup.
