= Axel Sjöberg (footballer, born 1991) =

Swedish footballer

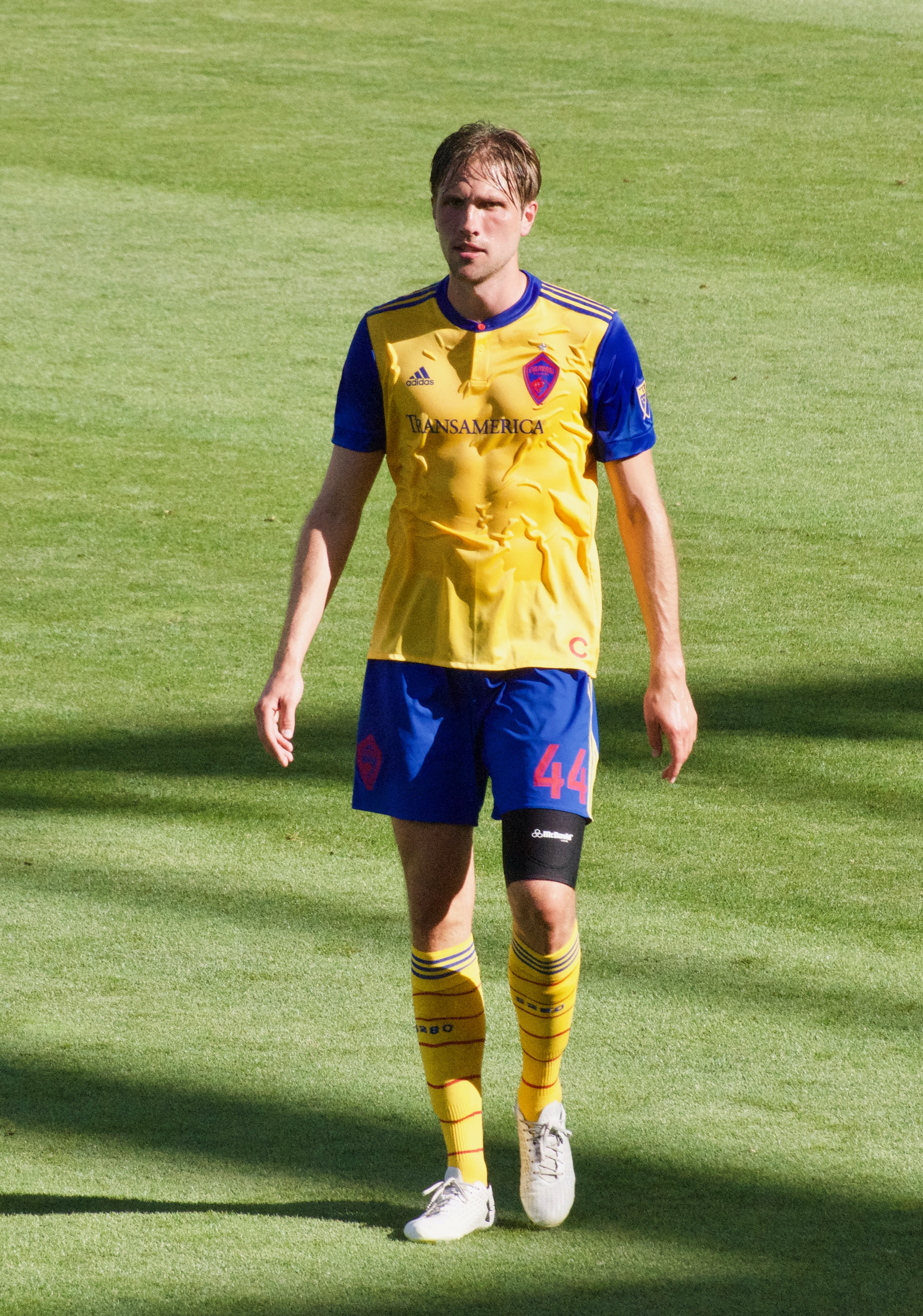

Personal information
- Date of birth: 8 March 1991 (age 35)
- Place of birth: Stockholm, Sweden
- Height: 2.01 m (6 ft 7 in)
- Position: Centre back

Youth career
- 1995–1997: Helenelunds IK
- 1997–2009: Djurgårdens IF

College career
Years	Team	Apps	(Gls)
2011–2014	Marquette Golden Eagles	63	(11)

Senior career*
Years	Team	Apps	(Gls)
2010	Sollentuna United FF	20	(3)
2012–2013	Thunder Bay Chill	29	(6)
2015–2019	Colorado Rapids	88	(3)
2020	Columbus Crew SC	0	(0)
2020	→ San Antonio FC (loan)	1	(0)
2020	D.C. United	2	(0)
2021	San Antonio FC	15	(1)
- * Club domestic league appearances and goals as of 19 October 2021

Axel Sjöberg (Swedish pronunciation: [ˈǎksɛl ˈɧø̂ːbærj]; born 8 March 1991) is a Swedish former footballer.

== Career ==
=== Early career ===
Sjöberg began his career with Helenelunds IK in his hometown at age four before moving to the academy of Djurgårdens IF, long-time member of the Allsvenskan, the top tier of the Swedish football league system at age 6 in 1997. Sjöberg stayed with the club until 2009, when he signed with Sollentuna United FF of Division 2 for 2010. Sjöberg scored three goals during the season and helped the club finish second in the league, seven points behind IK Frej. Sjöberg was selected for the club's Player of the Year award following the season. The club's second-place finish was enough to earn a berth in the 2011 Svenska Cupen. Sjöberg did not appear in the cup matches as Sollentuna advanced out of the preliminary round with a shootout victory over Nyköpings BIS before being knocked out in the next round with a 0–4 defeat to Vasalunds IF.

=== College and semi-professional ===
In 2011, Sjöberg committed to play college soccer with the Marquette Golden Eagles of Marquette University. In his four years with the team before graduating, Sjöberg appeared in (and started) 63 matches and tallied eleven goals and 9 assists. Beginning with his second year with the team, Sjöberg played every minute of every match. For his performances, he was the recipient of numerous awards including multiple Big East Player of the Week awards and being named one of the 10 best defenders in college soccer by TopDrawerSoccer.com.

For the 2012 and 2013 seasons, Sjöberg also played semi-professional soccer for the Thunder Bay Chill of the Premier Development League, the fourth tier of the United States soccer league system. He and two other Marquette teammates were invited to the club after the Chill played a friendly match with Marquette in Milwaukee. In 2012, he appeared in 15 matches and tallied two goals and an assist. The following season, he appeared in 14 matches and scored four goals for the Canadian club. In 2012, he helped the Chill win the Heartland Division championship. In 2013 the Chill were crowned regular seasons champions of the PDL and advanced to the final match in which they lost to the Austin Aztex. Sjöberg was named the club's Defender of the Year for both seasons.

=== Professional ===
==== Early career ====
In July 2014, Sjöberg went on trial with GAIS of the Swedish Superettan. During the trial, he appeared in one friendly match, a 3–0 victory over Lärje-Angered IF on 16 July. Also in 2014, Sjöberg trialed with SK Sigma Olomouc of the Czech Synot Liga. After scoring two goals in three matches with the reserve team, he was offered a contract.

==== Colorado Rapids ====
In January 2015, Sjöberg was invited to the 2015 MLS Combine and was projected by some MLS analysts to be a potential first round draft pick in the 2015 MLS SuperDraft. On the night before the draft, Major League Soccer analyst Jonathan Yardley described Sjöberg as the most MLS-ready defender available. Sjöberg went on to be drafted 14th overall by the Colorado Rapids after they swapped picks with the Columbus Crew SC to take him.

Sjöberg made his professional debut on 7 March 2015 in Colorado's opening match of the 2015 season. He started the eventual 0–0 draw with the Philadelphia Union and was credited with keeping the defense organized after the Rapids went down a man in the 68th minute. About Sjöberg being a starter, Rapids head coach Pablo Mastroeni said, "It wasn't a part of the plan but that's why we do preseason. These two guys (Sjöberg and fellow rookie Dominique Badji) have proven that they're fully capable and ready to contribute to the team right now."

Sjöberg scored his first professional goal for the Rapids on 21 May 2016 in a 1–0 victory over the Seattle Sounders FC. The game-winning goal secured ensured that Colorado moved back atop the overall Major League Soccer standings after being displaced momentarily by FC Dallas who were victorious earlier in the matchday.

During his first 11 starts of the 2016 Major League Soccer season, the Colorado Rapids conceded only seven goals which, among other qualities, made him an early contender for the MLS Defender of the Year award and for a spot on the 2016 MLS All-Star Game roster according to one MLS columnist. Although he was not named to the all-star squad, another MLS columnist named Sjöberg one of the top five most surprising omissions from the roster as the player was a consistent contributor to the best defense in the league to that point of the season.

In 2017, Sjöberg started the Rapids' home and away openers before picking up a hamstring injury in the away opener. Sjöberg returned to the lineup on 21 May 2017.

At the conclusion of the 2019 season Sjöberg was placed on waivers by Colorado, ending his tenure with the club.

==== Columbus Crew SC ====
On 4 December 2019, Sjöberg was selected off waivers by Columbus Crew SC. On 6 March 2020, Sjöberg joined USL Championship club San Antonio FC on loan for the 2020 season.

==== D.C. United ====
On 14 August 2020, D.C. United acquired Sjöberg from Columbus Crew in exchange for Emmanuel Boateng. Sjöberg made his debut for United on 29 August 2020, in a 1–4 loss against the Philadelphia Union. He was released by D.C. United on 30 November 2020.

==== San Antonio FC ====
On 21 January 2021, Sjöberg re-joined San Antonio FC.

==== Retirement ====
On April 24, 2022, Sjöberg announced on his Instagram page that he had decided to retire from professional football.

== Career statistics ==
As of 11 September 2019

Club	Season	League			Cup (Note: All appearances in the U.S. Open Cup)		Continental		Other		Total	
Club	Season	Division	Apps	Goals	Apps	Goals	Apps	Goals	Apps	Goals	Apps	Goals
Sollentuna United FF	2010	Division 2	20	3	–		–		–		20	3
Thunder Bay Chill	2012	PDL	15	2	–		–		1 (Note: Appearance(s) in the PDL playoffs)	0	16	2
Thunder Bay Chill	2013	PDL	14	4	–		–		4	0	18	4
Thunder Bay Chill	Total		29	6	0	0	0	0	5	0	34	6
Colorado Rapids	2015	MLS	14	0	0	0	–		–		14	0
Colorado Rapids	2016	MLS	31	2	1	0	–		4 (Note: Appearances in the MLS Cup Playoffs)	0	36	2
Colorado Rapids	2017	MLS	19	1	1	0	–		–		20	1
Colorado Rapids	2018	MLS	17	0	0	0	0	0	–		17	0
Colorado Rapids	2019	MLS	7	0	1	0	–		0	0	8	0
Colorado Rapids	Total		88	3	3	0	0	0	4	0	95	3
Career total			137	12	3	0	0	0	9	0	149	12

== Honours ==
Individual

- MLS Best XI: 2016
