= Sebastián Jaime =

Argentine-born Chilean footballer

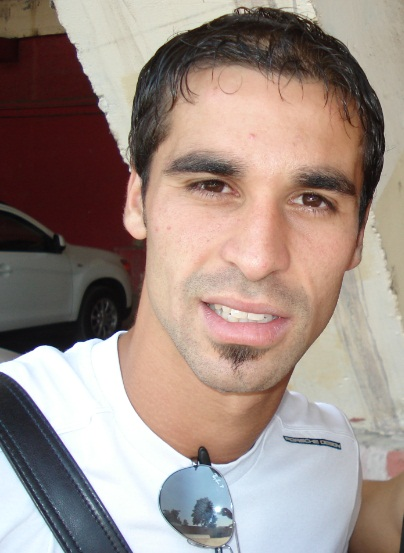
- Jaime in 2012

Personal information
- Full name: Sebastián Oscar Jaime
- Date of birth: January 30, 1987 (age 39)
- Place of birth: La Plata, Argentina
- Height: 1.80 m (5 ft 11 in)
- Position: Forward

Youth career
- Cambaceres

Senior career*
Years	Team	Apps	(Gls)
2008–2009	Cambaceres	38	(13)
2009–2010	Argentinos Juniors	1	(0)
2010	Deportes La Serena	19	(10)
2011–2014	Unión Española	123	(44)
2014–2015	Real Salt Lake	27	(5)
2016	Universidad Católica	17	(2)
2017–2018	Unión Española	50	(10)
2019–2020	Curicó Unido	45	(8)
2021	Rangers	18	(1)
2022	Unión Española	11	(2)
Total		349	(95)
- * Club domestic league appearances and goals

Sebastián Oscar Jaime (born January 30, 1987) is a former Argentine naturalized Chilean footballer who played as a forward.

== Career ==
As a member of Universidad Católica, Jaime won both the 2016 Clausura and the 2016 Apertura. He also won the 2016 Supercopa de Chile.

His last club was Unión Española in the 2022 season.

== Honours ==
Argentinos Juniors

- Argentine Primera División (1): 2010 Apertura

Unión Española

- Primera División de Chile (1): 2013 Transición
- Supercopa de Chile (1): 2013

Universidad Católica

- Primera División de Chile (2): 2016 Clausura, 2016 Apertura
- Supercopa de Chile (1): 2016
