= Nicolas Hansen =

Danish footballer (born 2001)

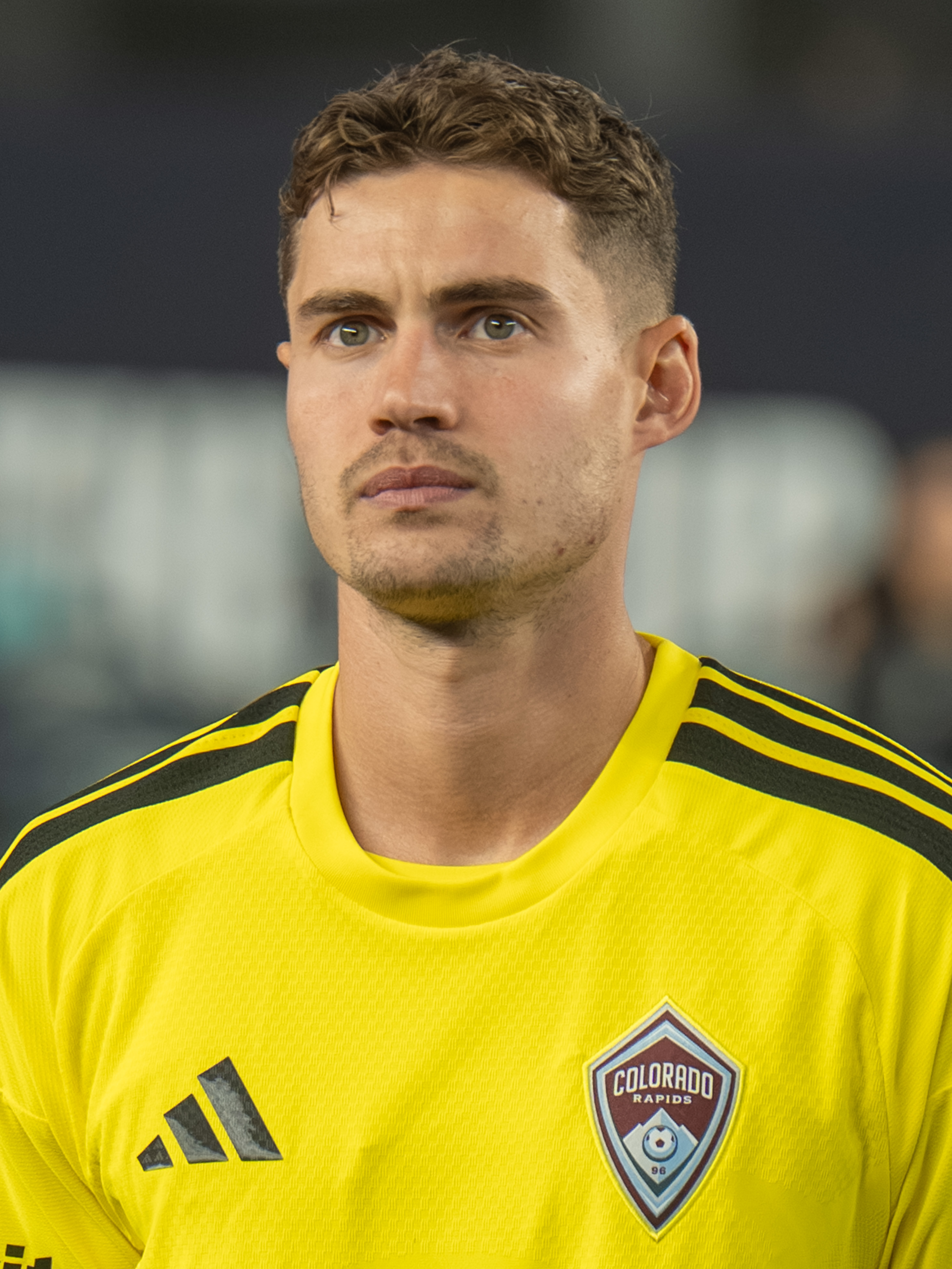
- Defreitas-Hansen with the Colorado Rapids in 2026

Personal information
- Full name: Nicolas Defreitas-Hansen
- Date of birth: 10 July 2001 (age 25)
- Place of birth: Southwest Ranches, Florida, US
- Height: 1.89 m (6 ft 2 in)
- Position: Goalkeeper

Team information
- Current team: Colorado Rapids
- Number: 41

Youth career
- –2017: Weston
- 2017–2021: Everton
- 2021–2022: Swansea City

Senior career*
| Years | Team | Apps | (Gls) |
| 2021–2022 | Swansea City | 0 | (0) |
| 2022–2023 | Atherton Collieries | 0 | (0) |
| 2024 | Houston Dynamo 2 | 10 | (0) |
| 2025– | Colorado Rapids | 8 | (0) |
| 2022 | → Colorado Rapids 2 (loan) | 2 | (0) |

International career^{‡}
| 2016–2017 | United States U16 | 3 | (0) |
| 2019–2020 | Denmark U19 | 3 | (0) |
- * Club domestic league appearances and goals as of 29 June 2025 ‡ National team caps and goals as of 26 February 2020

Nicolas Defreitas-Hansen (born 10 July 2001) is a professional footballer who plays as a goalkeeper for Major League Soccer club Colorado Rapids. Born in the United States, he is a Denmark and United States youth international.

== Early life ==
Defreitas-Hansen was born on 10 July 2001 in Southwest Ranches, Florida, United States. Born to a Danish father and a Brazilian mother, he is the younger brother of American soccer player Luca Defreitas-Hansen.

== Club career ==
As a youth player, Defreitas-Hansen joined the youth academy of American side Weston FC. In 2017, he joined the youth academy of English Premier League side Everton FC. Welsh newspaper wrote in 2021 that he "regularly trained with England's number one goalkeeper Jordan Pickford" while playing for the club.

Four years later, he joined the youth academy of Welsh side Swansea City AFC and was promoted to the club's senior team the same year, where he made zero league appearances and scored zero goals. Following his stint there, he signed for English side Atherton Collieries AFC in 2022. Ahead of the 2024 season, he signed for American side Houston Dynamo 2, where he made ten league appearances and scored zero goals. Subsequently, he signed for American side Colorado Rapids in 2025. On 27 April 2025, he debuted for the club during a 1–1 home draw with Seattle Sounders FC in the league.

== International career ==
Defreitas-Hansen is a Denmark and United States youth international. During November 2019, he played for the Denmark national under-19 football team for 2020 UEFA European Under-19 Championship qualification.
