= 2014 New England Revolution season =

New England Revolution
2014 season
- Owner: Robert Kraft
- Head coach: Jay Heaps
- Stadium: Gillette Stadium
- Major League Soccer: Eastern Conference: 2nd Overall: 5th
- MLS Cup Playoffs: Finals
- U.S. Open Cup: Quarterfinals
- Top goalscorer: League: Lee Nguyen (18 goals); All: Lee Nguyen (22 goals)
- Highest home attendance: 32,766 vs. Toronto FC (October 25)
- Lowest home attendance: 11,293 vs. Seattle Sounders FC (May 11)
- Average home league attendance: Regular season: 16,681; Playoffs: 26,441
Home colors	Away colors

The 20 and 14 New England Revolution season was the club's nineteenth season of existence, and their nineteenth consecutive season in Major League Soccer, the top flight of American soccer.

The Revs' season was most notable for their run to the MLS Cup final, where they lost to LA Galaxy, 2–1, after extra time. As of 2024, this is the club's most recent appearance in the MLS Cup final, leaving the club with an unprecedented 0–5 record in the title game since its first appearance in 2002.

== Review ==
=== Major League Soccer ===
==== March ====
New England Revolution started the season against the Houston Dynamo on March 8. Houston won 4–0 with goals from Will Bruin (2 goals), Óscar Boniek García, and Omar Cummings scored for Houston. Bobby Shuttleworth denied Bruin and Cummings an extra goal each after a breakaway. New England faced Philadelphia Union on March 15. Philadelphia won 1–0 with a goal from Sébastien Le Toux. New England made five changes to their lineup from the previous week. The Revs began their home slate for the 2014 season with a 0–0 against the Vancouver Whitecaps FC. They went back on the road to grab their first win on the season against the San Jose Earthquakes. The Revs got an own goal from the Earthquakes and Lee Nguyen potted the winner late in stoppage time to pull out a 2–1 victory.

==== April ====
New England began April with a poor effort in a 2–0 loss to D.C. United on the road. However, they bounced back to earn a 2–0 victory at home against the Houston Dynamo on the first goal of Kevin Alston's career and a late Jerry Bengtson insurance goal. The Revs then earned a fantastic 1–1 draw at the Chicago Fire because of goalkeeper Bobby Shuttleworth's penalty kick save late in the game. New England then put in a fantastic effort to take down defending MLS Cup champions Sporting Kansas City where Teal Bunbury scored his first goal for New England 2 minutes into stoppage time and Lee Nguyen added a late penalty kick goal to give the Revs the 2–0 win.

==== May ====
The Revs began May the same way they finished April with a strong effort in a 2–1 win at Toronto FC. Rookie Patrick Mullins showed off his left foot with a long, driven strike to pull the Revs even and Lee Nguyen finished it off with another goal from a penalty. New England welcomed the Seattle Sounders FC with a drubbing the league leading Sounders with flurry of goals winning their 3rd straight with a 5–0 result. Diego Fagundez got on the scorers sheet with a double helping the Revs to victory. New England followed up that result with another offensive showing in a 5–3 win over the Philadelphia Union, becoming just the third team in MLS history to score five goals in back-to-back games. The Revs spread the wealth in the attack with five different players scoring the five goals. A.J. Soares and Chris Tierney each scored their first goals of the year while Diego Fagundez, Patrick Mullins and Lee Nguyen continued their form to help the Revs to victory.

=== U.S. Open Cup ===
On Friday, May 16, 2014, it was announced that the New England Revolution would face the winner of the game between the Richmond Kickers and the Greek American AA. The Revolution ended up playing the Kickers and won the game 3–2 on the strength of 3 first half goals. New England advanced to play their USL affiliate the Rochester Rhinos and ended up downing them with another pair of goals early in the game. In the quarterfinals the Revolution were matched up against the Philadelphia Union and were put down rather easily with a 2–0 result in the Union's favor ending New England's chances at winning the U.S. Open Cup.

== Squad ==
=== Roster ===
As of May 19, 2014. Source: New England Revolution Roster

No.	Name	Nationality	Position	Date of birth (age)	Previous club
Goalkeepers
18	Brad Knighton	(United States)	GK	February 6, 1985 (age 41)	(Canada) Vancouver Whitecaps FC
22	Bobby Shuttleworth	(United States)	GK	May 13, 1987 (age 39)	(United States) Austin Aztex
36	Luis Soffner	(United States)	GK	January 5, 1990 (age 36)	(United States) Indiana University
Defenders
2	Andrew Farrell	(United States)	CB	April 2, 1992 (age 34)	(United States) University of Louisville
5	A.J. Soares	(United States)	CB	November 28, 1988 (age 37)	(United States) University of California
8	Chris Tierney	(United States)	LB	January 9, 1986 (age 40)	(United States) University of Virginia
15	Stephen McCarthy	(United States)	CB	July 21, 1988 (age 38)	(United States) University of North Carolina
17	O'Brian Woodbine	(Jamaica)	RB	January 11, 1988 (age 38)	(Finland) Vaasan Palloseura
23	Jose Goncalves (c)	(Portugal)	CB	September 17, 1985 (age 41)	(Switzerland) FC Sion
25	Darrius Barnes	(United States)	RB	December 24, 1986 (age 39)	(United States) Duke University
30	Kevin Alston	(United States)	RB	May 5, 1988 (age 38)	(United States) Indiana University
44	Jossimar Sanchez	(Colombia)	CB	September 4, 1991 (age 35)	(United States) University of Connecticut
Midfielders
4	Steve Neumann	(United States)	M	October 7, 1991 (age 35)	(United States) Georgetown University
6	Scott Caldwell	(United States)	M	March 15, 1991 (age 35)	(United States) University of Akron
11	Kelyn Rowe	(United States)	M	December 25, 1991 (age 34)	(United States) University of California, Los Angeles
12	Andy Dorman	(Wales)	M	May 1, 1982 (age 44)	(England) Crystal Palace
14	Diego Fagundez	(Uruguay)	M	February 14, 1995 (age 31)	(United States) New England Revolution Academy
16	Daigo Kobayashi	(Japan)	M	February 19, 1983 (age 43)	(Canada) Vancouver Whitecaps FC
19	Alec Sundly	(United States)	M	August 8, 1992 (age 34)	(United States) University of California
21	Shalrie Joseph	(Grenada)	M	May 24, 1978 (age 48)	(United States) Seattle Sounders FC
24	Lee Nguyen	(United States)	M	October 7, 1986 (age 40)	(Vietnam) Becamex Binh Duong
33	Donnie Smith	(United States)	M	January 15, 1990 (age 36)	(United States) University of North Carolina-Charlotte
Forwards
7	Patrick Mullins	(United States)	F	February 2, 1992 (age 34)	(United States) University of Maryland
9	Charlie Davies	(United States)	F	June 25, 1986 (age 40)	(Denmark) Randers FC
10	Teal Bunbury	(United States)	F	February 27, 1990 (age 36)	(United States) Sporting Kansas City
27	Jerry Bengtson	(Honduras)	F	April 8, 1987 (age 39)	(Honduras) Motagua
92	Dimitry Imbongo	(Republic of the Congo)	F	March 28, 1990 (age 36)	(Germany) TSV 1860 München II

=== Technical staff ===
Position	Staff
Head Coach	(United States) Jay Heaps
First Assistant Coach	(United States) Tom Soehn
Goalkeeping Coach	(Canada) Remi Roy
Strength and Conditioning Coach	(United States) Nick Downing
Technical Director	(United States) Ross Duncan
Soccer Operations Manager	(United States) Jason Gove
Soccer Operations Analyst	(United States) Tim Crawford
Equipment Manager	(United States) Scott Emmens
Head Athletic Trainer	(United States) Evan Allen
Assistant Athletic Trainer	(United States) Phil Madore
Massage Therapist	(United States) Glenn O'Connor
Head Team Physician	(United States) Scott Martin, M.D.

Last updated: May 19, 2014
Source: Club Staff

== Player movement ==
=== In ===
Per Major League Soccer and club policies terms of the deals do not get disclosed.

Date	Player	Position	Previous club	Notes	Ref
November 22, 2013	(Portugal) Jose Goncalves	D	(Switzerland) FC Sion	Exercised option to buy once Goncalves' loan ended	
November 25, 2013	(United States) Paolo DelPiccolo	MF	(United States) Montreal Impact	Acquired via Waiver Draft	
December 11, 2013	(United States) Brad Knighton	GK	(Canada) Vancouver Whitecaps FC	Acquired via trade in exchange for a conditional 2015 MLS Superdraft pick	
January 9, 2014	(United States) Charlie Davies	F	(Denmark) Randers FC	Signed as a Free Transfer once loan expired	
February 19, 2014	(United States) Teal Bunbury	M	(United States) Sporting Kansas City	Acquired via trade in exchange for a first-round pick in the 2015 MLS Superdraft and Allocation Money	
February 26, 2014	(Japan) Daigo Kobayashi	M	(Canada) Vancouver Whitecaps FC	Acquired in exchange for a fourth-round pick in the 2015 MLS Superdraft	
March 21, 2014	(United States) Matt Pickens	GK	(United States) Colorado Rapids	Acquired via Waiver Draft	
April 9, 2014	(United States) Larry Jackson	GK	Unattached	Signed as a Free Agent	
April 22, 2014	(Grenada) Shalrie Joseph	M	(United States) Seattle Sounders FC	Acquired via Waiver Draft	
August 24, 2014	(United States) Jermaine Jones	M	(Turkey) Beşiktaş	Signed on a free transfer for three years, $5,500,000. Assigned via Blind Draw with the Chicago Fire.	
August 25, 2014	(Netherlands) Geoffrey Castillion	F	(Netherlands) NEC Nijmegen	Signed on a Free Transfer	

=== Out ===
Date	Player	Position	Destination club	Notes	Ref
November 22, 2013	(United States) Chad Barrett	F	(United States) Seattle Sounders FC	Contract Option Declined; Selected in Stage Two of the 2013 MLS Re-Entry Draft	
November 22, 2013	(United States) Ryan Guy	M	(United States) San Diego Flash	Contract Option Declined	
November 22, 2013	(United States) Tyler Polak	D	(United States) Minnesota United FC	Contract Option Declined	
November 22, 2013	(United States) Matt Reis	GK	None	Contract Option Declined; Subsequently, Retired	
November 22, 2013	(United States) Clyde Simms	M	None	Contract Option Declined; Subsequently, Retired	
November 22, 2013	(Colombia) Juan Toja	M	None	Contract Option Declined	
November 22, 2013	(United States) Bilal Duckett	D	(United States) Charlotte Eagles	Contract Option Declined	
November 22, 2013	(United States) Matt Horth	F	(Iceland) Leiknir Reykjavík	Contract Option Declined	
November 22, 2013	(United States) Gabe Latigue	M	None	Contract Option Declined	
November 22, 2013	(United States) Juan Agudelo	F	(England) Stoke City FC	Out of Contract; Signed a pre-contract agreement with Stoke City FC was subsequently loaned to FC Utrecht due to Work Permit issues	
March 10, 2014	(United States) Paolo DelPiccolo	M	(United States) Arizona United	Waived	
March 26, 2014	(United States) Matt Pickens	GK	(United States) Tampa Bay Rowdies	Undisclosed Transfer	

=== Loans ===
==== Out ====
Date	Player	Position	Loan To	Notes	Ref
March 13, 2014	(United States) Luis Soffner	GK	(United States) Rochester Rhinos	Season-long loan	
March 13, 2014	(United States) Alec Sundly	MF	(United States) Rochester Rhinos	Season-long loan	
March 21, 2014	(United States) Jossimar Sanchez	DF	(United States) Rochester Rhinos	Season-long loan	
May 29, 2014	(United States) Donnie Smith	MF	(United States) Rochester Rhinos	Season-long loan	
July 25, 2014	(Honduras) Jerry Bengtson	ST	(Argentina) Club Atlético Belgrano	Year-long loan through June 30, 2015	

== Non-competitive ==
=== Preseason ===
The Revs played seven preseason games with a 2-1-4 record, including a 1-1-2 mark at the Desert Diamond Cup.

==== Friendly ====
January 31 Friendly	New England Revolution	1–1	Malmo FF	Bradenton, Florida
	Rowe 5'	Report	Forsberg 36'	Stadium: IMG Academy

February 4 Friendly	New England Revolution	1–1	Philadelphia Union	Deltona, Florida
	Melo 60' (yellow card) 90'; Caldwell (yellow card) 79'	Report	McInerney 30'	Stadium: Dewey O. Boster Sports Complex

February 6 Friendly	Fort Lauderdale Strikers	1–2	New England Revolution	Bradenton, Florida
3:00 p.m. EST	24' #15 (yellow card) 45' #29 (yellow card) 51' (red card) 66'	Report	Imbongo 34'; Nguyen (yellow card) 84'; Barnes 91'	Stadium: IMG Academy

==== Desert Diamond Cup ====
February 19 Group	Real Salt Lake	0–0	New England Revolution	Tucson, Arizona
18:00 PST		Report		Stadium: Kino Veterans Memorial Stadium; Referee: Baldomero Toledo

February 22 Group	New England Revolution	2–3	Chivas USA	Tucson, Arizona
18:00 PST	Nguyen 11'; Bunbury 20'; Gonçalves (yellow card) 42'	Report	Torres 25'; Alvarez 54'; Rosales 74'; Burling (yellow card) 92+'	Stadium: Kino Veterans Memorial Stadium; Referee: Jair Marrufo

February 26 Group	New England Revolution	1–0	Chicago Fire	Tucson, Arizona
15:30 PST	Rowe 90+1'	Report	Hurtado (yellow card) 34'	Stadium: Kino Veterans Memorial Stadium

March 1 Final	New England Revolution	2–2	Colorado Rapids	Tucson, Arizona
15:30 MST	Bunbury 5'; Rowe (yellow card) 37'; Mullins 57'; Imbongo (red card) 85'	Report	Buddle 25'; LaBrocca (yellow card) 35'; José Mari (yellow card) 55'; Sánchez 82'; Chávez (red card) 85'	Stadium: Kino Veterans Memorial Stadium; Attendance: 1,604; Referee: Jair Marrufo

== Matches and results ==
=== MLS regular season ===
Win

Tie

Loss

March 8, 2014 MLS 1	Houston Dynamo	4–0	New England Revolution	Houston, Texas, U.S.
20:00 (EDT)	Bruin 2', 13', (yellow card) 64'; Boniek 23'; Cummings 90+2'	Report	Barnes (yellow card) 64'; Soares (yellow card) 77'	Stadium: BBVA Compass Stadium; Attendance: 22,320; Referee: Ramon Hernandez

March 15, 2014 MLS 2	Philadelphia Union	1–0	New England Revolution	Chester, Pennsylvania, U.S.
16:00 (EDT)	McInerney (yellow card) 10'; Le Toux 31'; Berry (yellow card) 48'	Report	Soares (yellow card) 70'	Stadium: PPL Park; Attendance: 18,651; Referee: Kevin Morrison

March 22, 2014 MLS 3	New England Revolution	0–0	Vancouver Whitecaps FC	Foxborough, Massachusetts, U.S.
14:00 (EDT)	Dorman (yellow card) 38'	Report	Reo-Coker (yellow card) 8'; Harvey (yellow card) 83'; Laba (yellow card) 88'	Stadium: Gillette Stadium; Attendance: 13,103; Referee: Hilario Grajeda

March 29, 2014 MLS 4	San Jose Earthquakes	1–2	New England Revolution	Santa Clara, California, U.S.
22:30 (EDT)	Wondolowski 69'	Report	Bernárdez 35' (o.g.); Kobayashi (yellow card) 51'; Tierney (yellow card) 63'; Nguyen 90+3'	Stadium: Buck Shaw Stadium; Attendance: 10,525; Referee: David Gantar

April 5, 2014 MLS 5	D.C. United	2–0	New England Revolution	Washington, D.C., U.S.
19:00 (EDT)	Neal (yellow card) 4'; Gonçalves 43' (o.g.); Doyle (yellow card) 90+2'; Rolfe 90+3'	Report	Dorman (yellow card) 36'; Davies (yellow card) 88'	Stadium: RFK Stadium; Attendance: 10,526; Referee: Jorge Gonzalez

April 12, 2014 MLS 6	New England Revolution	2–0	Houston Dynamo	Foxborough, Massachusetts, U.S.
17:00 (EDT)	Alston 68', (yellow card) 88'; Caldwell (yellow card) 86'; Bengtson 90+1'	Report	Clark (yellow card) 36'	Stadium: Gillette Stadium; Attendance: 14,259; Referee: Edvin Jurisevic

April 19, 2014 MLS 7	Chicago Fire	1–1	New England Revolution	Bridgeview, Illinois, U.S.
19:30 (EDT)	Amarikwa 16', (yellow card) 34' (yellow-red card) 73'	Report	Nguyen 31' (pen.); Barnes (yellow card) 45+2'; Dorman (yellow card) 64'; Soares (yellow card) 86'; Alston (red card) 90'	Stadium: Toyota Park; Attendance: 15,743; Referee: Sorin Stoica

April 26, 2014 MLS 8	New England Revolution	2–0	Sporting Kansas City	Foxborough, Massachusetts, U.S.
19:30 (EDT)	Nguyen (yellow card) 47', (goal) 90+5' (pen.); Dorman (yellow card) 71'; Bunbury 90+2'	Report	Toni (yellow card) 41'; Collin (red card) 74'; Dwyer (yellow card) 88'	Stadium: Gillette Stadium; Attendance: 14,806; Referee: Alan Kelly

May 3, 2014 MLS 9	Toronto FC	1–2	New England Revolution	Toronto, Ontario, Canada
13:00 (EDT)	Jackson 6', (yellow card) 43'; Bradley (yellow card) 58'	Report	Mullins 24'; Fagúndez (yellow card) 75'; Nguyen 82' (pen.); Caldwell (yellow card) 90+2'	Stadium: BMO Field; Attendance: 22,591; Referee: Mark Geiger

May 11, 2014 MLS 10	New England Revolution	5–0	Seattle Sounders FC	Foxborough, Massachusetts, U.S.
19:00 (EDT)	Mullins 14'; Fagúndez 29', 41'; Bunbury 36'; Marshall 46' (o.g.)	Report	Traoré (yellow card) 45+1'; Pineda (yellow card) 73'	Stadium: Gillette Stadium; Attendance: 11,293; Referee: Jose Carlos Rivero

May 17, 2014 MLS 11	Philadelphia Union	3–5	New England Revolution	Chester, Pennsylvania, U.S.
19:00 (EDT)	Nogueira 36'; Berry (yellow card) 67'; Williams 76'; Okugo (yellow card) 78'; Maidana (red card) 82'; Le Toux 90+2' (pen.)	Report	Soares 13'; Fagúndez 26'; Nguyen 49', (yellow card) 88'; Tierney 57'; Mullins 67'	Stadium: PPL Park; Attendance: 18,812; Referee: Ted Unkel

May 24, 2014 MLS 12	New England Revolution	2–1	D.C. United	Foxborough, Massachusetts, U.S.
19:30 (EDT)	Mullins 55'; Bunbury (yellow card) 64'; Fagúndez (yellow card) 67', (goal) 77'	Report	Korb (yellow card) 39'; Kitchen (yellow card) 42'; Arnaud (yellow card) 67'; Espíndola 73'; Johnson (red card) 82'	Stadium: Gillette Stadium; Attendance: 13,589; Referee: Juan Guzman

May 31, 2014 MLS 13	Montreal Impact	2–0	New England Revolution	Montreal, Quebec, Canada
19:00 (EDT)	Romero 3'; McInerney 38'; Felipe (yellow card) 63'	Report	Dorman (yellow card) 40'; Bunbury (yellow card) 76'	Stadium: Saputo Stadium; Attendance: 18,068; Referee: Silviu Petrescu

June 8, 2014 MLS 14	New England Revolution	0–2	New York Red Bulls	Foxborough, Massachusetts, U.S.
17:00 (EDT)	Tierney (yellow card) 45+3'	Report	Alexander 17'; Robles (yellow card) 63'; Miazga (yellow card) 69'; Luyindula 76'; Sekagya (yellow card) 86'; Akpan (yellow card) 90+4'	Stadium: Gillette Stadium; Attendance: 23,950; Referee: Geoff Gamble

June 28, 2014 MLS 15	New England Revolution	1–3	Philadelphia Union	Foxborough, Massachusetts, U.S.
19:30 (EDT)	Sène 73', (yellow card) 74'; Dorman (yellow card) 85'; Gonçalves (yellow card) 90+1'	Report	Le Toux 42', 78'; Cruz 69'; Wenger (yellow card) 80'	Stadium: Gillette Stadium; Attendance: 16,483; Referee: Alan Kelly

July 4, 2014 MLS 16	Real Salt Lake	2–1	New England Revolution	Sandy, Utah, U.S.
22:00 (EDT)	Wingert (yellow card) 19'; Morales 35' (pen.), (yellow card) 36'; Plata 65' (pen.)	Report	Nguyen (yellow card) 32'; Barnes 37'; Tierney (yellow card) 64'	Stadium: Rio Tinto Stadium; Attendance: 20,513; Referee: Allen Chapman

July 12, 2014 MLS 17	New England Revolution	0–1	Chicago Fire	Foxborough, Massachusetts, U.S.
19:30 (EDT)	Kobayashi (yellow card) 23'; Gonçalves (yellow card) 63'	Report	Amarikwa 3'; Ianni (yellow card) 84'; Ward (yellow card) 90+2'	Stadium: Gillette Stadium; Attendance: 15,406; Referee: Jose Carlos Rivero

July 16, 2014 MLS 18	LA Galaxy	5–1	New England Revolution	Carson, California, U.S.
22:30 (EDT)	Keane 10', 78'; DeLaGarza (yellow card) 11'; Zardes 18', 48'; Gargan (red card) 36'; Leonardo (yellow card) 51'; Ishizaki 75'; Hoffman (yellow card) 82'	Report	Soares (red card) 29'; Nguyen 38' (pen.); Bengston (yellow card) 74'	Stadium: StubHub Center; Attendance: 17,741; Referee: Ricardo Salazar

July 19, 2014 MLS 19	FC Dallas	2–0	New England Revolution	Frisco, Texas, U.S.
21:00 (EDT)	Escobar 29'; Akindele 90+1'	Report	Tierney (yellow card) 79'	Stadium: Toyota Stadium; Attendance: 15,551; Referee: Armando Villarreal

July 26, 2014 MLS 20	New England Revolution	1–2	Columbus Crew	Foxborough, Massachusetts, U.S.
19:30 (EDT)	Soares 50'; Caldwell (yellow card) 52'; Nguyen (yellow card) 90'	Report	Higuaín (yellow card) 41', (goal) 43'; Finlay 84'	Stadium: Gillette Stadium; Attendance: 14,542; Referee: Alan Kelly

July 30, 2014 MLS 21	New England Revolution	3–0	Colorado Rapids	Foxborough, Massachusetts, U.S.
19:30 (EDT)	Nguyen 10', 75'; Mullins (yellow card) 72'; Rowe 78'	Report	Piermayr (yellow card) 31' (yellow-red card) 74'; Irwin (yellow card) 74'	Stadium: Gillette Stadium; Attendance: 13,831; Referee: Juan Guzmán

August 2, 2014 MLS 22	New York Red Bulls	2–1	New England Revolution	Harrison, New Jersey, U.S.
19:00 (EDT)	Mizaga (red card) 45+2'; McCarty 48'; Wright-Phillips 63'	Report	Davies (yellow card) 2', (goal) 20'; Caldwell (yellow card) 70'; Rowe (yellow card) 83'	Stadium: Red Bull Arena; Attendance: 20,862; Referee: Allen Chapamn

August 16, 2014 MLS 23	New England Revolution	1–1	Portland Timbers	Foxborough, Massachusetts, U.S.
19:30 (EDT)	Davies 26'	Report	Fernández (yellow card) 53'; Ridgewell 65'	Stadium: Gillette Stadium; Attendance: 16,409; Referee: Mark Geiger

August 23, 2014 MLS 24	New England Revolution	1–0	Chivas USA	Foxborough, Massachusetts, U.S.
19:30 (EDT)	Soares (yellow card) 48'; Nguyen 56'	Report	Torres (yellow card) 15'; Lochhead (yellow card) 53'; Minda (yellow card) 70'	Stadium: Gillette Stadium; Attendance: 16,427; Referee: David Gantar

August 30, 2014 MLS 25	Toronto FC	0–3	New England Revolution	Toronto, Ontario, Canada
17:00 (EDT)	Gilberto (yellow card) 82'	Report	Nguyen 2'; Bunbury (yellow card) 4', (goal) 58'; Rowe 21', (yellow card) 36'; Caldwell (yellow card) 47'	Stadium: BMO Field; Attendance: 22,591; Referee: Silviu Petrescu

September 3, 2014 MLS 26	New England Revolution	3–1	Sporting Kansas City	Foxborough, Massachusetts, U.S.
19:30 (EDT)	Kobayashi (yellow card) 22'; Bunbury (yellow card) 29', (goal) 45'; Nguyen 48', 90+4'; Rowe 84'	Report	Saad 8'; Lopez 35'; Sinovic (yellow card) 39'; Zusi (yellow card) 84'	Stadium: Gillette Stadium; Attendance: 11,707; Referee: Ismail Elfath

September 7, 2014 MLS 27	New England Revolution	2–1	Chicago Fire	Foxborough, Massachusetts, U.S.
19:00 (EDT)	Fagúndez 41'; Davies 60'; Barnes (yellow card) 74'; Caldwell (yellow card) 78'; Jones (yellow card) 78'	Report	Nyassi 28'; Palmer (yellow card) 36'; Cociș (yellow card) 39'; Soumaré (yellow card) 58'	Stadium: Gillette Stadium; Attendance: 12,204; Referee: Chris Penso

September 13, 2014 MLS 28	New England Revolution	2–1	Montreal Impact	Foxborough, Massachusetts, U.S.
19:30 (EDT)	Rowe 23'; Nguyen 25'; Farrell (yellow card) 17'; Bunbury (yellow card) 48'	Report	Mallace 13'; Król (yellow card) 47' (yellow-red card) 62'; Lefèvre (yellow card) 65'	Stadium: Gillette Stadium; Attendance: 19,665; Referee: Alan Kelly

September 20, 2014 MLS 29	Columbus Crew	1–0	New England Revolution	Columbus, Ohio, U.S.
19:30 (EDT)	Higuaín 48', (yellow card) 72'; Meram (yellow card) 23'; Wahl (yellow card) 39'; Gehrig (yellow card) 75'; Clark (yellow card) 90+3'	Report	Barnes (yellow card) 47'	Stadium: Columbus Crew Stadium; Attendance: 21,318; Referee: Ted Unkel

September 26, 2014 MLS 30	Sporting Kansas City	2–3	New England Revolution	Kansas City, Kansas, U.S.
20:00 (EDT)	Claros (yellow card) 39'; Nagamura 54'; Dwyer 56'; Zusi (yellow card) 61'; Besler (yellow card) 90'	Report	Kobayashi (yellow card) 8'; Rowe 22'; Gonçalves 23', (yellow card) 89'; Jones 85'; Davies (yellow card) 90+4'	Stadium: Sporting Park; Attendance: 19,522; Referee: Baldomero Toledo

October 4, 2014 MLS 31	New England Revolution	2–1	Columbus Crew	Foxborough, Massachusetts, U.S.
19:30 (EDT)	Nguyen 20', (yellow card) 90+4'; Gonçalves (yellow card) 41'; Soares (yellow card) 59'; Jones (yellow card) 64', (goal) 67'	Report	Finlay 25'; Francis (yellow card) 39' (yellow-red card) 70'; Schoenfeld (yellow card) 64'; Higuaín (yellow card) 90+3'	Stadium: Gillette Stadium; Attendance: 23,143; Referee: Jose Carlos Rivero

October 11, 2014 MLS 32	Montreal Impact	2–2	New England Revolution	Montreal, Quebec, Canada
16:00 (EDT)	Di Vaio 12', 39'	Report	Rowe 16'; Jones (yellow card) 47'; Nguyen 69'	Stadium: Saputo Stadium; Attendance: 14,389; Referee: Geoff Gamble

October 16, 2014 MLS 33	Houston Dynamo	1–2	New England Revolution	Houston, Texas, U.S.
20:00 (EDT)	Barnes 37', (yellow card) 73'; Taylor (yellow card) 47'; Garrido (yellow card) 52'	Report	Nguyen 65', 87'	Stadium: BBVA Compass Stadium; Attendance: 22,332; Referee: Ted Unkel

October 25, 2014 MLS 34	New England Revolution	1–0	Toronto FC	Foxborough, Massachusetts, U.S.
19:30 (EDT)	Nguyen 35'	Report	Morrow (yellow card) 61'	Stadium: Gillette Stadium; Attendance: 32,766; Referee: Ricardo Salazar

=== MLS Cup Playoffs ===
November 1, 2014 Eastern Conference Semifinals; First leg	Columbus Crew	2–4	New England Revolution	Columbus, Ohio, U.S.
16:00 (EDT)	Meram 64'; Francis (yellow card) 70'; Añor (yellow card) 90+1'; Higuaín 90+4' (pen.)	Report	Gonçalves (yellow card) 17'; Davies 34', 78'; Tierney 51'; Nguyen 70'	Stadium: Columbus Crew Stadium; Attendance: 9,040; Referee: (Canada) Drew Fischer

November 9, 2014 Eastern Conference Semifinals; Second leg	New England Revolution	3–1 (7–3 agg.)	Columbus Crew	Foxborough, Massachusetts, U.S.
17:00 (EST)	Nguyen 43'; Gonçalves 55'; Bunbury 77'	Report	Finlay (red card) 61'; Meram (yellow card) 66' (yellow-red card) 85'; Tchani 69'	Stadium: Gillette Stadium; Attendance: 20,184; Referee: (United States) Armando Villarreal

November 23, 2014 Eastern Conference Finals; First leg	New York Red Bulls	1–2	New England Revolution	Harrison, New Jersey, U.S.
13:30 (EST)	Wright-Phillips 27', (yellow card) 60'; Henry (yellow card) 37'; Sekagya (yellow card) 43'; Eckersley (yellow card) 54'; Alexander (yellow card) 63'; Cahill (yellow card) 77'	Report	Bunbury 17'; Soares (yellow card) 23'; Jones (yellow card) 26', (goal) 85'; Caldwell (yellow card) 67'; Nguyen (yellow card) 83'	Stadium: Red Bull Arena; Attendance: 25,000; Referee: (United States) Allen Chapman

November 29, 2014 Eastern Conference Finals; Second leg	New England Revolution	2–2 (4–3 agg.)	New York Red Bulls	Foxborough, Massachusetts, U.S.
15:00 (EST)	Davies 41', 70'	Report	Cahill 26'; Luyindula 52'; McCarty (yellow card) 60'; Oyongo (yellow card) 90+2'; Sam (yellow card) 90+3'	Stadium: Gillette Stadium; Attendance: 32,698; Referee: (United States) Baldomero Toledo

December 7, 2014 MLS Cup Finals	LA Galaxy	2–1 (a.e.t.)	New England Revolution	Carson, California, U.S.
15:00 (EST)	Donovan (yellow card) 45+1'; Zardes 52'; Rogers (yellow card) 82'; Keane (yellow card) 92', (goal) 111'; Sarvas (yellow card) 113'; Gordon (yellow card) 113'	Report	Farrell (yellow card) 62'; Tierney 79'; Jones (yellow card) 113'	Stadium: StubHub Center; Attendance: 27,000; Referee: (United States) Mark Geiger

=== U.S. Open Cup ===
June 18, 2014 Round 4	Richmond Kickers	2–3	New England Revolution	Richmond, Virginia
19:00 (EDT)	Davis IV 24'; William (yellow card) 40'; Delicâte 74'	Report	McCarthy 8'; Fagundez (yellow card) 33'; Neumann 35'; Mullins 39'	Stadium: Richmond City Stadium; Referee: Daniel Fitzgerald

June 25, 2014 Round 5	New England Revolution	2–1	Rochester Rhinos	Providence, Rhode Island
19:30 (EDT)	Sène 11'; Rowe 33'; Gonçalves (yellow card) 85'	Report	Hoffer (yellow card) 23'; Rolfe 55', (yellow card) 82'; Walls (yellow card) 76'; Diallo (red card) 90'	Stadium: Stevenson Field; Attendance: 1,570; Referee: Younes Marrakchi

July 8, 2014 Quarterfinals	Philadelphia Union	2–0	New England Revolution	Chester, Pennsylvania
19:00 (EDT)	Casey 9'; Le Toux 48'; Okugo (yellow card) 57'; Williams (yellow card) 75'; Wheeler (yellow card) 76'	Report	McCarthy (yellow card) 16'; Soares (yellow card) 47' (yellow-red card) 90+4'; Gonçalves (yellow card) 71'; Nguyen (yellow card) 74'	Stadium: PPL Park; Attendance: 2,626; Referee: Fotis Bazakos

== Tables ==
=== Eastern Conference ===
Pos	Team	Pld	W	L	T	GF	GA	GD	Pts	Qualification
1	D.C. United	34	17	9	8	52	37	+15	59	Qualification for the conference semifinals
2	New England Revolution	34	17	13	4	51	37	+14	55	Qualification for the conference semifinals
3	Columbus Crew SC	34	14	10	10	52	42	+10	52	Qualification for the conference semifinals
4	New York Red Bulls	34	13	10	11	55	50	+5	50	Qualification for the knockout round
5	Sporting Kansas City	34	14	13	7	48	41	+7	49	Qualification for the knockout round
6	Philadelphia Union	34	10	12	12	51	51	0	42	
7	Toronto FC	34	11	15	8	44	54	−10	41	
8	Houston Dynamo	34	11	17	6	39	58	−19	39	
9	Chicago Fire	34	6	10	18	41	51	−10	36	
10	Montreal Impact	34	6	18	10	38	58	−20	28	

Source: MLS

=== Overall table ===
Pos	Team	Pld	W	L	T	GF	GA	GD	Pts	Qualification
1	Seattle Sounders FC (S, U)	34	20	10	4	65	50	+15	64	Qualification for the CONCACAF Champions League
2	LA Galaxy (C)	34	17	7	10	69	37	+32	61	Qualification for the CONCACAF Champions League
3	D.C. United	34	17	9	8	52	37	+15	59	Qualification for the CONCACAF Champions League
4	Real Salt Lake	34	15	8	11	54	39	+15	56	Qualification for the CONCACAF Champions League
5	New England Revolution	34	17	13	4	51	46	+5	55	
6	FC Dallas	34	16	12	6	55	45	+10	54	
7	Columbus Crew	34	14	10	10	52	42	+10	52	
8	New York Red Bulls	34	13	10	11	55	50	+5	50	
9	Vancouver Whitecaps FC	34	12	8	14	42	40	+2	50	Qualification for the CONCACAF Champions League
10	Sporting Kansas City	34	14	13	7	48	41	+7	49	
11	Portland Timbers	34	12	9	13	61	52	+9	49	
12	Philadelphia Union	34	10	12	12	51	51	0	42	
13	Toronto FC	34	11	15	8	44	54	−10	41	
14	Houston Dynamo	34	11	17	6	39	58	−19	39	
15	Chicago Fire	34	6	10	18	41	51	−10	36	
16	Chivas USA	34	9	19	6	29	61	−32	33	
17	Colorado Rapids	34	8	18	8	43	62	−19	32	
18	San Jose Earthquakes	34	6	16	12	35	50	−15	30	
19	Montreal Impact (V)	34	6	18	10	38	58	−20	28	

Source: MLS
Rules for classification: 1) points; 2) head-to-head record; 3) goal difference; 4) number of goals scored
(C) MLS Cup champions; (S) Supporters' Shield winners; (U) U.S. Open Cup winners; (V) Canadian Championship winners

=== Results summary ===
Overall								Home						Away					
Pld	Pts	W	L	T	GF	GA	GD	W	L	T	GF	GA	GD	W	L	T	GF	GA	GD
33	52	16	13	4	50	46	+4	10	4	2	27	14	+13	6	9	2	23	32	−9

Last updated: October 19, 2014
Source: Results
Pld = Matches played; Pts = Points; W = Matches won; T = Matches tied; L = Matches lost; GF = Goals for; GA = Goals against; GD = Goal difference

=== Results ===
Round	1	2	3	4	5	6	7	8	9	10	11	12	13	14	15	16	17	18	19	20	21	22	23	24	25	26	27	28	29	30	31	32	33	34
Stadium	A	A	H	A	A	H	A	H	A	H	A	H	A	H	H	A	H	A	A	H	H	A	H	H	A	H	H	H	A	A	H	A	A	H
Result	L	L	T	W	L	W	T	W	W	W	W	W	L	L	L	L	L	L	L	L	W	L	T	W	W	W	W	W	L	W	W	T	W	W

Updated to match(es) played on June 17, 2014. Source: MLS Results and revolutionsoccer.net
A = Away; H = Home; W = Win; L = Loss; T = Tie

== Player information ==
=== Outfield player statistics ===
No.	Nat.	Player	Total						MLS regular season						MLS Cup Playoffs						U.S. Open Cup						Ref.
No.	Nat.	Player	App.	Min.	Gls	Ast	YC	RC	App.	Min.	Gls	Ast	YC	RC	App.	Min.	Gls	Ast	YC	RC	App.	Min.	Gls	Ast	YC	RC	Ref.
Goalkeepers
18	(United States)	Brad Knighton	5	450	0	1	0	0	2	180	0	0	0	0	0	0	0	0	0	0	3	270	0	1	0	0	
Defenders
2	(United States)	Andrew Farrell	37	3244	0	0	2	0	32	2840	0	0	1	0	4	390	0	0	1	0	1	14	0	0	0	0	
5	(United States)	A. J. Soares	38	3331	2	1	8	2	32	2806	2	1	5	1	5	480	0	0	1	0	1	45	0	0	2	1	
8	(United States)	Chris Tierney	30	2500	3	7	4	0	24	1930	1	5	4	0	5	480	2	2	0	0	1	90	0	0	0	0	
15	(United States)	Stephen McCarthy	4	301	1	0	1	0	1	90	0	0	0	0	0	0	0	0	0	0	3	211	1	0	1	0	
23	(Portugal)	Jose Goncalves	35	3120	2	2	6	0	27	2381	1	2	3	0	5	569	1	0	1	0	3	270	0	0	2	0	
25	(United States)	Darrius Barnes	26	1906	0	2	4	0	22	1628	0	2	4	0	1	8	0	0	0	0	3	270	0	0	0	0	
30	(United States)	Kevin Alston	16	997	1	3	1	1	11	683	1	3	1	1	4	224	0	0	0	0	1	90	0	0	0	0	
Midfielders
4	(United States)	Steve Neumann	26	808	1	1	0	0	23	538	0	0	0	0	0	0	0	0	0	0	3	270	1	1	0	0	
6	(United States)	Scott Caldwell	34	2241	0	3	7	0	26	1553	0	2	6	0	5	418	0	1	1	0	3	270	0	0	0	0	
11	(United States)	Kelyn Rowe	34	2359	6	6	3	0	27	1960	5	5	3	0	5	352	0	1	0	0	2	74	1	0	0	0	
12	(Wales)	Andy Dorman	20	1340	0	1	6	0	16	1237	0	1	6	0	3	42	0	0	0	0	1	61	0	0	0	0	
13	(United States)	Jermaine Jones	15	1085	3	6	5	0	10	613	2	4	3	0	5	472	1	2	2	0	0	0	0	0	0	0	
14	(Uruguay)	Diego Fagundez	33	2277	5	4	3	0	31	2142	5	4	2	0	0	0	0	0	0	0	2	135	0	0	1	0	
16	(Japan)	Daigo Kobayashi	38	1990	0	5	4	0	34	1867	0	4	4	0	3	78	0	1	0	0	1	45	0	0	0	0	
19	(United States)	Alec Sundly	1	90	0	0	0	0	0	0	0	0	0	0	0	0	0	0	0	0	1	90	0	0	0	0	
24	(United States)	Lee Nguyen	40	3379	22	8	7	0	32	2750	18	5	5	0	5	433	2	2	1	0	3	196	2	1	1	0	
39	(France)	Saer Sene	10	501	0	0	1	0	10	395	1	0	1	0	0	0	0	0	0	0	2	106	1	0	0	0	
Forwards
7	(United States)	Patrick Mullins	26	1339	5	3	1	0	21	1198	4	1	1	0	3	64	0	1	0	0	2	77	1	1	0	0	
9	(United States)	Charlie Davies	25	1612	7	5	3	0	18	1143	3	4	3	0	5	410	4	1	0	0	2	59	0	0	0	0	
10	(United States)	Teal Bunbury	36	2916	5	8	5	0	31	2446	4	6	5	0	5	480	1	2	0	0	0	0	0	0	0	0	
27	(Honduras)	Jerry Bengtson	7	238	1	0	1	0	7	238	1	0	1	0	0	0	0	0	0	0	0	0	0	0	0	0	
33	(United States)	Donnie Smith	3	225	0	0	0	0	1	45	0	0	0	0	0	0	0	0	0	0	2	180	0	0	0	0	
39	(Netherlands)	Geoffrey Castillion	1	14	0	0	0	0	1	14	0	0	0	0	0	0	0	0	0	0	0	0	0	0	0	0	
92	(Republic of the Congo)	Dimitry Imbongo	2	32	0	0	0	0	2	32	0	0	0	0	0	0	0	0	0	0	0	0	0	0	0	0	
99	(United States)	Tony Taylor	1	9	0	0	0	0	1	9	0	0	0	0	0	0	0	0	0	0	0	0	0	0	0	0	

=== Goalkeeper statistics ===
No.	Nat.	Player	Total							MLS regular season							MLS Cup Playoffs							U.S. Open Cup							Ref.
No.	Nat.	Player	App.	Min.	GA	GAA	W	D	L	App.	Min.	GA	GAA	W	D	L	App.	Min.	GA	GAA	W	D	L	App.	Min.	GA	GAA	W	D	L	Ref.
18	(United States)	Brad Knighton	5	450	11	2.20	3	0	2	2	180	6	3.00	1	0	1	0	0	0	—	0	0	0	3	270	5	1.67	2	0	1	
22	(United States)	Bobby Shuttleworth	37	3360	48	1.29	19	5	13	32	2880	40	1.25	16	4	12	5	480	8	1.50	3	1	1	0	0	0	—	0	0	0	

== Recognition ==
=== Leading scorers ===
Rank	Scorer	Goals	Assists
1	(United States) Lee Nguyen	18	5
2	(United States) Kelyn Rowe	5	5
2	(Uruguay) Diego Fagundez	5	4
4	(United States) Teal Bunbury	4	6
4	(United States) Patrick Mullins	4	1

Updated to end of regular season.
Source: - 2014 New England Revolution

=== MLS Team of the Week ===
Week	Player	Report
3	(Portugal) Jose Goncalves	Report
5	(United States) Andrew Farrell	Report
6	(United States) Kevin Alston	Report
6	(United States) Andrew Farrell	Report
8	(United States) Teal Bunbury	Report
8	(United States) Andrew Farrell	Report
9	(United States) Lee Nguyen	Report
10	(Uruguay) Diego Fagundez	Report
11	(Uruguay) Diego Fagundez	Report
11	(United States) Lee Nguyen	Report
11	(United States) Chris Tierney	Report
21	(United States) Lee Nguyen	Report
24	(United States) Bobby Shuttleworth	Report
25	(United States) Kelyn Rowe	Report
26	(United States) Lee Nguyen	Report
26	(United States) Jermaine Jones	Report
27	(United States) Lee Nguyen	Report
29	(Portugal) Jose Goncalves	Report
30	(United States) Chris Tierney	Report
30	(United States) Bobby Shuttleworth	Report
32	(United States) Lee Nguyen	Report
32	(United States) A.J. Soares	Report

=== MLS Player of the Week ===
Week	Player	Report
32	(United States) Lee Nguyen	Report

== Kits ==
Home	Home Alt.	Away

Type	Shirt	Shorts	Socks	First appearance / Info
Home	Navy	White	Navy	
Home Alt.	Navy	Navy	Navy	MLS, March 8 against Houston
Away	White	White	White	

== See also ==
- New England Revolution
- 2014 in American soccer
- 2014 Major League Soccer season
