= 2015 New England Revolution season =

New England Revolution
2015 season
- Owner: Robert Kraft
- Head coach: Jay Heaps
- Stadium: Gillette Stadium
- Major League Soccer: Conference: 5th Overall: 11th
- MLS Cup Playoffs: Knockout Round
- U.S. Open Cup: Fourth round
- Top goalscorer: Charlie Davies (7)
- Highest home attendance: 42,947 (Oct. 17 vs. Montreal)
- Lowest home attendance: 10,668 (Mar. 28 vs. San Jose)
- Average home league attendance: 19,627
Home colors	Away colors

The 2015 New England Revolution season was the club's twentieth season of existence, and their twentieth in Major League Soccer, the top tier of the American soccer pyramid. The club enters the season as the defending Eastern Conference champions.

Outside of MLS regular season play, the club participated in the 2015 U.S. Open Cup.

== Review ==
=== Preseason ===
==== Off season Player movement ====
Immediately after losing the 2014 MLS Cup Final, the New England Revolution began making roster moves to improve the team for 2015. On December 8, 2014, just a day after the Cup Final, the Revolution traded Dimitry Imbongo and Geoffrey Castillion to the Colorado Rapids in exchange for goalkeeper Joe Nasco. On the same day, in preparation for the 2014 MLS Expansion Draft, the Revolution declined options on nine players, goalkeepers Larry Jackson, Joe Nasco and Luis Soffner, defender Jossimar Sanchez, midfielders Shalrie Joseph, Donnie Smith and Alec Sundly and forwards Andre Akpan and Tony Taylor, as well not extending a bona fide contract offer to defender Stephen McCarthy. The Revolution also completed trades with the two new franchises, New York City FC and Orlando City SC to ensure that Revolution Academy graduate Diego Fagundez was not selected in the Expansion Draft. During the draft, New York City FC selected Patrick Mullins and Tony Taylor in the second and fifth rounds, respectively. On December 18, 2014 New England traded their fourth-round pick in the 2015 MLS SuperDraft to Toronto FC in exchange for midfielder Jeremy Hall and selected Tristan Bowen in the 2014 MLS Re-Entry Draft. At the 2015 MLS SuperDraft, the Revolution traded their second-round pick to Seattle Sounders FC in exchange for Sean Okoli and used their own third-round pick to draft Cal State Fullerton forward Marc Fenelus. Midfielder Donnie Smith was re-signed by the club on January 23, staying with the team for a third year. 2013 starting forward Juan Agudelo on January 30.

== Personnel ==
=== Roster ===
As of August 26, 2015. Source: New England Revolution Roster

No.	Name	Nationality	Position	Date of birth (age)	Previous club
Goalkeepers
18	Brad Knighton	(United States)	GK	February 6, 1985 (age 41)	(United States) Vancouver Whitecaps FC
22	Bobby Shuttleworth	(United States)	GK	May 13, 1987 (age 39)	(United States) Austin Aztex
26	Trevor Spangenberg	(United States)	GK	April 24, 1991 (age 35)	(United States) Chivas USA
Defenders
2	Andrew Farrell	(United States)	CB	April 2, 1992 (age 34)	(United States) University of Louisville
5	Jeremy Hall	(United States)	RB	September 11, 1988 (age 37)	(Canada) Toronto F.C.
8	Chris Tierney	(United States)	LB	January 9, 1986 (age 40)	(United States) University of Virginia
23	José Gonçalves	(Portugal)	CB	September 17, 1985 (age 40)	(Switzerland) FC Sion
25	Darrius Barnes	(United States)	RB	December 24, 1986 (age 39)	(United States) Duke University
28	London Woodberry	(United States)	CB	May 28, 1991 (age 35)	(United States) Arizona United
30	Kevin Alston	(United States)	RB	May 5, 1988 (age 38)	(United States) Indiana University
Midfielders
4	Steve Neumann	(United States)	M	October 7, 1991 (age 34)	(United States) Georgetown University
6	Scott Caldwell	(United States)	M	March 15, 1991 (age 35)	(United States) University of Akron
11	Kelyn Rowe	(United States)	M	December 25, 1991 (age 34)	(United States) University of California, Los Angeles
12	Andy Dorman	(Wales)	M	May 1, 1982 (age 44)	(England) Crystal Palace
13	Jermaine Jones (c)	(United States)	M	November 3, 1981 (age 44)	(Turkey) Beşiktaş J.K
14	Diego Fagundez	(Uruguay)	M	February 14, 1995 (age 31)	(United States) New England Revolution Academy
16	Daigo Kobayashi	(Japan)	M	February 19, 1983 (age 43)	(United States) Vancouver Whitecaps FC
21	Zachary Herivaux	(Haiti)	M	February 1, 1996 (age 30)	(United States) New England Revolution Academy
24	Lee Nguyen	(United States)	M	October 7, 1986 (age 39)	(Vietnam) Becamex Binh Duong
29	Tyler Rudy	(United States)	M	September 29, 1993 (age 32)	(United States) Pittsburgh Riverhounds U23
33	Donnie Smith	(United States)	M	December 7, 1990 (age 35)	Carolina Dynamo
92	Timi Mulgrew	(United States)	M	September 16, 1992 (age 33)	(United States) Ocean City Nor'easters
Forwards
7	Sean Okoli	(United States)	F	February 3, 1993 (age 33)	(United States) Seattle Sounders F.C.
9	Charlie Davies	(United States)	F	June 25, 1986 (age 40)	(Denmark) Randers FC
10	Teal Bunbury	(United States)	F	February 27, 1990 (age 36)	(United States) Sporting Kansas City
17	Juan Agudelo	(United States)	F	November 23, 1992 (age 33)	(Netherlands) FC Utrecht

=== Technical staff ===
Position	Staff
Head Coach	(United States) Jay Heaps
First Assistant Coach	(United States) Tom Soehn
Goalkeeping Coach	(Canada) Remi Roy
Strength and Conditioning Coach	(United States) Nick Downing
Technical Director	(United States) Ross Duncan
Soccer Operations Manager	(United States) Jason Gove
Soccer Operations Analyst	(United States) Tim Crawford
Equipment Manager	(United States) Scott Emmens
Head Athletic Trainer	(United States) Evan Allen
Assistant Athletic Trainer	(United States) Phil Madore
Massage Therapist	(United States) Glenn O'Connor
Head Team Physician	(United States) Scott Martin, M.D.

Last updated: February 24, 2015
Source: Club Staff

== Player movement ==
=== In ===
Per Major League Soccer and club policies terms of the deals do not get disclosed.

Date	Player	Position	Previous club	Notes	Ref
December 8, 2014	(United States) Joe Nasco	GK	Colorado Rapids	Trade	
December 18, 2014	(United States) Tristan Bowen	F	Seattle Sounders FC	Re-Entry Draft	
December 18, 2014	(United States) Jeremy Hall	M	Toronto FC	Trade	
January 15, 2015	(United States) Sean Okoli	F	Seattle Sounders FC	Trade	
January 30, 2015	(United States) Juan Agudelo	F	Unattached	Free	
February 28, 2015	(United States) Tyler Rudy	M	Pittsburgh Riverhounds U23	Free	
February 28, 2015	(United States) London Woodberry	D	Arizona United	Free	
March 5, 2015	(United States) Trevor Spangenberg	GK	Chivas USA	Free	
March 18, 2015	(United States) Timi Mulgrew	F	Ocean City Nor'easters	Free	
May 2, 2015	(Haiti) Zachary Herivaux	M	New England Revolution Youth	Homegrown	

=== Out ===
Date	Player	Position	Destination club	Notes	Ref
December 8, 2014	(Netherlands) Geoffrey Castillion	F	Colorado Rapids	Trade	
December 8, 2014	(France) Dimitry Imbongo	F	Colorado Rapids	Trade	
December 10, 2014	(United States) Patrick Mullins	F	New York City FC	Expansion Draft	
December 10, 2014	(United States) Tony Taylor	F	New York City FC	Expansion Draft	
February 24, 2015	(United States) A.J. Soares	D	Viking FK	Free Transfer	

== Matches and results ==
=== Preseason ===
January 31, 2015 Scrimmage	Real Salt Lake	1–2	New England Revolution	Casa Grande, AZ
11:00 EDT	Jaime 63'	Report	Davies 7'; Okoli 48'	Stadium: Grande Sports World
Note: 80-minute scrimmage.

February 4, 2015	Vancouver Whitecaps FC	2–0	New England Revolution	Tucson, AZ
EDT	Rivero 57', 62'; Harvey (yellow card) 78'	Report	Bunbury (yellow card) 21'	Stadium: Kino Sports Complex

=== Desert Diamond Cup ===
February 18, 2015	Real Salt Lake	1–0	New England Revolution	Tucson, AZ
20:00 EDT	Sandoval 6' (pen.); Mansally (yellow card) 50'	Report	Barnes (yellow card) 16'	Stadium: Kino North Grandstand

February 21, 2015	Colorado Rapids	1–1	New England Revolution	Tucson, AZ
19:30 EDT	Sjöberg (yellow card) 25'; Torres 48'; LaBrocca (yellow card) 83'	Report	Dorman (yellow card) 24'; Alston (yellow card) 36'; Fagúndez 54'	Stadium: Kino North Stadium; Referee: Daniel Radford

February 25, 2015	Seattle Sounders FC	1–2	New England Revolution	Tucson, AZ
20:00 EDT	Cooper 4'; Jones (yellow card) 42'; Roldan (yellow card) 59'; Lowe (yellow card) 74'	Report	Fagundez (yellow card) 44'; Lowe 47' (o.g.); Rudy (red card) 60'; Davies 90+' (pen.)	Stadium: Kino North Grandstand

February 28, 2015	FC Tucson	0–3	New England Revolution	Tucson, AZ
18:30 EDT		Report	Bunbury 30'; Gonçalves (yellow card) 39'; Rowe 46'; Okoli 90+'	Stadium: Kino North Stadium; Referee: Fotis Bazakos

=== MLS regular season ===
Win Tie Loss

March 8, 2015 MLS 1	Seattle Sounders FC	3–0	New England Revolution	Seattle, WA
21:30 EDT	Dempsey 25' (pen.), 67'; Martins 41'	Report	Gonçalves (yellow card) 73'	Stadium: CenturyLink Field; Attendance: 39,782; Referee: Juan Guzmán

March 15, 2015 MLS 2	New York City FC	2–0	New England Revolution	New York, NY
17:00 EDT	Wingert (yellow card) 6'; Villa 19'; Williams (yellow card) 57'; Mullins 84'	Report	Rowe (yellow card) 11'; Gonçalves (red card) 66'; Dorman (yellow card) 73'	Stadium: Yankee Stadium; Attendance: 43,507; Referee: Mark Geiger

March 21, 2015 MLS 3	New England Revolution	0–0	Montreal Impact	Foxborough, MA
15:00 EDT	Hall (yellow card) 90+1'	Report	Cabrera (yellow card) 8'; Camara (yellow card) 29' (yellow-red card) 61'; Mallace (yellow card) 39'; McInerney (yellow card) 90+3'	Stadium: Gillette Stadium; Attendance: 14,189; Referee: Edvin Jurisevic

March 28, 2015 MLS 4	New England Revolution	2–1	San Jose Earthquakes	Foxborough, MA
15:00 EDT	Rowe 21', 37'	Report	Goodson (yellow card) 13'; Francis (yellow card) 57'; Wondolowski 64' (pen.)	Stadium: Gillette Stadium; Attendance: 10,668; Referee: Jose Carlos Rivero

April 4, 2015 MLS 5	Colorado Rapids	0–2	New England Revolution	Commerce City, CO
19:00 EDT	Sarvas (yellow card) 32'; Powers (yellow card) 60'; Harrington (yellow card) 66'; Burch (yellow card) 90+6'	Report	Agudelo 18'; Davies (yellow card) 26'; Dorman (yellow card) 34'; Nguyen 54' (pen.); Tierney (yellow card) 90'	Stadium: Dick's Sporting Goods Park; Attendance: 11,450; Referee: Fotis Bazakos

April 11, 2015 MLS 6	New England Revolution	0–0	Columbus Crew	Foxborough, MA
15:00 EDT	Jones (yellow card) 12'; Agudelo (yellow card) 55'; Dorman (yellow card) 68'	Report	Tchani (yellow card) 62'; Higuaín (yellow card) 65'; Saeid (yellow card) 87'	Stadium: Gillette Stadium; Attendance: 13,092; Referee: Silviu Petrescu

April 19, 2015 MLS 7	Philadelphia Union	1–2	New England Revolution	Chester, PA
19:30 EDT	Gaddis (yellow card) 41'; Maidana 42'; Casey (yellow card) 84'; Williams (yellow card) 90'	Report	Nguyen (yellow card) 37'; Davies 64'; Bunbury 76', (yellow card) 90+1'	Stadium: PPL Park; Attendance: 18,106; Referee: Mark Geiger

April 25, 2015 MLS 8	New England Revolution	4–0	Real Salt Lake	Foxborough, MA
19:30 EDT	Tierney 39'; Agudelo 43'; Davies 50'; Caldwell 84'	Report	Stertzer (yellow card) 10'; Saborío (yellow card) 56'; Mulholland (yellow card) 81'	Stadium: Gillette Stadium; Attendance: 17,982; Referee: Ismail Elfath

May 2, 2015 MLS 9	New England Revolution	2–1	New York Red Bulls	Foxborough, MA
19:30 EDT	Davies 9'; Dorman (yellow card) 36'; Bunbury 60'; Agudelo (yellow card) 76'; Tierney (yellow card) 87'; Bunbury (yellow card) 90'	Report	Richards (yellow card) 45'; Ouimette (yellow card) 52'; Kljestan (yellow card) 62' (goal) 73'	Stadium: Gillette Stadium; Attendance: 18,296; Referee: Marcos de Oliviera

May 8, 2015 MLS 10	Orlando City SC	2–2	New England Revolution	Orlando, FL
20:00 EDT	Shea (yellow card) 31'; Ramos (yellow card) 45+1'; Kaká (yellow card) 65'; Larin 75'; Rivas (yellow card) 76'; Collin 90'	Report	Davies 19'; Woodberry (yellow card) 38'; Jones (yellow card) 53'; Rowe 71'; Caldwell (yellow card) 84'	Stadium: Citrus Bowl; Attendance: 27,243; Referee: Ted Unkel

May 16, 2015 MLS 11	New England Revolution	1–1	Toronto FC	Foxborough, MA
19:30 EDT	Agudelo 32'	Report	Bradley 53'; Konopka (yellow card) 80'	Stadium: Gillette Stadium; Attendance: 24,269; Referee: Sorin Stoica

May 20, 2015 MLS 12	Sporting Kansas City	4–2	New England Revolution	Kansas City, KS
20:00 EDT	Dwyer 29' (yellow card) 37'; Feilhaber (yellow card) 30' (goal) 43' (pen.); Németh 39', 46'; Dia (yellow card) 71'; Mustivar (yellow card) 76'	Report	Agudelo 11'; Dorman (yellow card) 41'; Caldwell 64'; Gonçalves (yellow card) 89'	Stadium: Sporting Park; Attendance: 18,864; Referee: Allen Chapman

May 23, 2015 MLS 13	New England Revolution	1–1	D.C. United	Foxborough, MA
19:30 EDT	Woodberry (yellow card) 26'; Davies 45+1'; Nguyen (yellow card) 45+2' (yellow-red card) 58'; Tierney (red card) 52'; Jones (yellow card) 88'	Report	Franklin (yellow card) 75'; Arrieta 80'; Kitchen (yellow card) 86'; Arnaud (yellow card) 89'	Stadium: Gillette Stadium; Attendance: 15,216; Referee: Mark Geiger

May 31, 2015 MLS 14	New England Revolution	2–2	LA Galaxy	Foxborough, MA
19:00 EDT	Bunbury 5'; Alston (yellow card) 24'; Fagundez 37'; Dorman (yellow card) 61'	Report	Maganto 18'; Zardes 27'	Stadium: Gillette Stadium; Attendance: 17,569; Referee: Alan Kelly

June 6, 2015 MLS 15	Portland Timbers	2–0	New England Revolution	Portland, OR
22:30 EDT	Villafaña (yellow card) 7'; Urruti (yellow card) 39'; Adi 86', 89'; Wallace (yellow card) 88'	Report	Bunbury (yellow card) 7'; Woodberry (yellow card) 45'; Nguyen (yellow card) 85'; Alston (yellow card) 90+3'	Stadium: Providence Park; Attendance: 21,114; Referee: Jose Carlos Rivero

June 13, 2015 MLS 16	New England Revolution	2–0	Chicago Fire	Foxborough, MA
19:30 EDT	Dorman (yellow card) 40'; Fagundez 48'; Davies 50'; Woodberry (yellow card) 59'	Report	Adailton (yellow card) 33'; Polster (yellow card) 43'; Igboananike (yellow card) 71'	Stadium: Gillette Stadium; Attendance: 15,775; Referee: (Canada) Silviu Petrescu

June 21, 2015 MLS 17	D.C. United	2–1	New England Revolution	Washington, DC
17:00 EDT	Rolfe 70' (pen.), 81'; Arnaud (yellow card) 78'	Report	Davies 10'	Stadium: RFK Stadium; Attendance: 17,213; Referee: (United States) Ismail Elfath

June 24, 2015 MLS 18	Columbus Crew	2–1	New England Revolution	Columbus, OH
19:30 EDT	Kamara 4', 50', (yellow card) 90+5'; Parkhurst (yellow card) 63'; Pogatetz (yellow card) 79'; Francis (yellow card) 86'; Steindórsson (yellow card) 90'	Report	Nguyen 1'; Shuttleworth (yellow card) 50'; Dorman (yellow card) 90+3'	Stadium: Mapfre Stadium; Attendance: 11,435; Referee: Fotis Bazakos

June 27, 2015 MLS 19	New England Revolution	1–2	Vancouver Whitecaps FC	Foxborough, MA
19:30 EDT	Farrell (yellow card) 20' (yellow-red card) 29'; Fagúndez (yellow card) 41'; Bunbury (yellow card) 54', (goal) 84'	Report	Techera 18'; Rivero 31' (pen.); Harvey (yellow card) 33'; Mattocks (yellow card) 82'; Beitashour (yellow card) 88'; Mezquida (yellow card) 90+1'	Stadium: Gillette Stadium; Attendance: 16,017; Referee: Allen Chapman

July 4, 2015 MLS 20	FC Dallas	3–0	New England Revolution	Frisco, TX
21:00 EDT	Díaz 9'; Castillo 64'; Barrios 73'; Loyd (yellow card) 84'	Report	Caldwell (yellow card) 76'	Stadium: Toyota Stadium; Attendance: 19,140; Referee: Baldomero Toledo

July 11, 2015 MLS 21	New York Red Bulls	4–1	New England Revolution	Harrison, NJ
19:00 EDT	Wright-Phillips 4', 12'; Sam 9'; Felipe (yellow card) 54'; Wallace 56'; McCarty (yellow card) 62'; Robles (yellow card) 65'; Lade (yellow card) 76'	Report	Gonçalves (yellow card) 35' (yellow-red card) 87'; Dorman 37'; Woodberry (yellow card) 58'	Stadium: Red Bull Arena; Attendance: 18,640; Referee: Alan Kelly

July 18, 2015 MLS 22	New England Revolution	1–0	New York City FC	Foxborough, MA
19:30 EDT	Nguyen 12' (yellow card) 29'; Caldwell (yellow card) 42'; Hall (yellow card) 90+2'	Report	Hernandez (yellow card) 48'; Grabavoy (red card) 54'; Jacobson (yellow card) 68'	Stadium: Gillette Stadium; Attendance: 28,811; Referee: Sorin Stoica

July 25, 2015 MLS 23	Chicago Fire	2–2	New England Revolution	Bridgeview, IL
20:30 EDT	Maloney 44' (pen.); Accam (yellow card) 61'; Shipp (yellow card) 62'; Cociș 75'; Gehrig (yellow card) 81'	Report	Nguyen 28'; Farrell (yellow card) 45+2'; Rowe 77'; Neumann (yellow card) 83'; Tierney (yellow card) 88'	Stadium: Toyota Park; Attendance: 14,159; Referee: Ricardo Salazar

August 1, 2015 MLS 24	New England Revolution	3–1	Toronto FC	Foxborough, MA
19:30 EDT	Gonçalves (yellow card) 30'; Davies 35', 62'; Nguyen 44' (pen.)	Report	Findley (yellow card) 34'; Altidore (red card) 39'; Kantari (yellow card) 48'; Bendik (yellow card) 60'; Perquis (yellow card) 61'; Osorio 75'	Stadium: Gillette Stadium; Attendance: 21,363; Referee: Chris Penso

August 15, 2015 MLS 25	New England Revolution	2–0	Houston Dynamo	Foxborough, MA
19:30 EDT	Gonçalves 69'; Agudelo 88'	Report	Garrido (yellow card) 59'; Horst (yellow card) 85'; Williams (yellow card) 88'	Stadium: Gillette Stadium; Attendance: 21,723; Referee: Jose Carlos Rivero

August 29, 2015 MLS 26	Philadelphia Union	0–1	New England Revolution	Chester, PA
19:00 EDT	Barnetta (yellow card) 38'; Nogueira (yellow card) 49'; Carroll (yellow card) 87'; Maidana (red card) 90+4'	Report	Fagúndez 51'; Jones (yellow card) 57'	Stadium: PPL Park; Attendance: 17,117

September 5, 2015 MLS 27	New England Revolution	3–0	Orlando City SC	Foxborough, MA
19:30 EDT	Fagúndez (yellow card) 6' (goal) 39'; Agudelo 84'; Tierney 90+4'	Report	Higuita (yellow card) 36'	Stadium: Gillette Stadium; Attendance: 18,854

September 13, 2015 MLS 28	Toronto FC	1–3	New England Revolution	Toronto, ON
17:00 EDT	Findley (yellow card) 51' (goal) 55'; Kantari (yellow card) 74'	Report	Perquis 4' (o.g.); Jones (yellow card) 27'; Fagúndez 39'; Farrell (yellow card) 59'; Rowe (yellow card) 63' (goal) 71'	Stadium: BMO Field; Attendance: 20,257

September 16, 2015 MLS 29	New England Revolution	2–1	New York Red Bulls	Foxborough, MA
19:30 EDT		Report		Stadium: Gillette Stadium; Attendance: 10,997; Referee: Ismail Elfath

September 19, 2015 MLS 30	Montreal Impact	3–0	New England Revolution	Montreal, QC
19:30 EDT		Report		Stadium: Saputo Stadium; Attendance: 20,801

September 26, 2015 MLS 31	New England Revolution	1–1	Philadelphia Union	Foxborough, MA
19:30 EDT		Report		Stadium: Gillette Stadium; Attendance: 25,885

October 3, 2015 MLS 32	Chicago Fire	3–1	New England Revolution	Bridgeview, IL
20:30 EDT		Report		Stadium: Toyota Park; Attendance: 16,694

October 17, 2015 MLS 33	New England Revolution	0–1	Montreal Impact	Foxborough, MA
19:30 EDT		Report	Piatti 55'	Stadium: Gillette Stadium; Attendance: 42,947; Referee: Mark Geiger

October 25, 2015 MLS 34	New York City FC	1–3	New England Revolution	New York, NY
17:00 EDT	Watson-Siriboe (yellow card) 77'; McNamara (yellow card) 86'; Villa 90+1' (pen.)	Report	Nguyen 5'; Davies 38'; Rowe 55'; Fagundez (yellow card) 88'	Stadium: Yankee Stadium; Attendance: 34,150; Referee: Jair Marrufo

=== MLS Cup Playoffs ===
October 28, 2015 Eastern Conference Semifinals; First leg	D.C. United	2–1	New England Revolution	Washington, DC, U.S.
19:30 (EDT)	Pontius 45'; Rolfe 83'	Report	Agudelo 15'	Stadium: RFK Stadium; Attendance: 11,554

=== U.S. Open Cup ===
Win Draw Loss Postponed

==== Fourth round ====
June 17, 2015 Round 4	New England Revolution	0–1	Charlotte Independence	Boston, Massachusetts
19:30 EDT		Report	Herrera 55'	Stadium: Soldiers Field Soccer Stadium; Attendance: 2,763; Referee: Mark Kadlecik

== Tables ==
=== Eastern Conference ===
Pos	Team	Pld	W	L	T	GF	GA	GD	Pts	Qualification
3	Montreal Impact	34	15	13	6	48	44	+4	51	MLS Cup Knockout Round
4	D.C. United	34	15	13	6	43	45	−2	51	MLS Cup Knockout Round
5	New England Revolution	34	14	12	8	48	47	+1	50	MLS Cup Knockout Round
6	Toronto FC	34	15	15	4	58	58	0	49	MLS Cup Knockout Round
7	Orlando City SC	34	12	14	8	46	56	−10	44	

Source: MLS

=== Overall table ===
Pos	Team	Pld	W	L	T	GF	GA	GD	Pts	Qualification
9	LA Galaxy	34	14	11	9	56	46	+10	51	
10	Sporting Kansas City	34	14	11	9	48	45	+3	51	CONCACAF Champions League
11	New England Revolution	34	14	12	8	48	47	+1	50	
12	Toronto FC	34	15	15	4	58	58	0	49	
13	San Jose Earthquakes	34	13	13	8	41	39	+2	47	

Source: MLS
Rules for classification: 1) points; 2) total wins; 3) total goal differential; 4) total goals scored

=== Results summary ===
Overall								Home						Away					
Pld	Pts	W	L	T	GF	GA	GD	W	L	T	GF	GA	GD	W	L	T	GF	GA	GD
5	7	2	2	1	4	6	−2	1	0	1	2	1	+1	1	2	0	2	5	−3

Last updated: April 6, 2015
Source: Results
Pld = Matches played; Pts = Points; W = Matches won; T = Matches tied; L = Matches lost; GF = Goals for; GA = Goals against; GD = Goal difference

=== Results ===
Round	1	2	3	4	5	6	7	8	9	10	11	12	13	14	15	16	17	18	19	20	21	22	23	24	25	26	27	28	29	30	31	32	33	34
Stadium	A	A	H	H	A	H	A	H	H	A	H	A	H	H	A	H	A	A	H	A	A	H	A	H	H	A	H	A	H	A	H	A	H	A
Result	L	L	T	W	W	T	W	W	W	T	T	L	T	T	L	W																		

Updated to match(es) played on April 6, 2015. Source: MLS Results and revolutionsoccer.net
A = Away; H = Home; W = Win; L = Loss; T = Tie

== Player information ==
=== Outfield player statistics ===
No.	Nat.	Player	Total						MLS regular season						MLS Cup Playoffs						U.S. Open Cup						Ref.
No.	Nat.	Player	App.	Min.	Gls	Ast	YC	RC	App.	Min.	Gls	Ast	YC	RC	App.	Min.	Gls	Ast	YC	RC	App.	Min.	Gls	Ast	YC	RC	Ref.
Defenders
2	(United States)	Andrew Farrell	0	0	0	0	0	0	0	0	0	0	0	0	0	0	0	0	0	0	0	0	0	0	0	0	
8	(United States)	Chris Tierney	0	0	0	0	0	0	0	0	0	0	0	0	0	0	0	0	0	0	0	0	0	0	0	0	
23	(Portugal)	José Gonçalves	0	0	0	0	0	0	0	0	0	0	0	0	0	0	0	0	0	0	0	0	0	0	0	0	
25	(United States)	Darrius Barnes	0	0	0	0	0	0	0	0	0	0	0	0	0	0	0	0	0	0	0	0	0	0	0	0	
30	(United States)	Kevin Alston	0	0	0	0	0	0	0	0	0	0	0	0	0	0	0	0	0	0	0	0	0	0	0	0	
Midfielders
4	(United States)	Steve Neumann	0	0	0	0	0	0	0	0	0	0	0	0	0	0	0	0	0	0	0	0	0	0	0	0	
4	(United States)	Jeremy Hall	0	0	0	0	0	0	0	0	0	0	0	0	0	0	0	0	0	0	0	0	0	0	0	0	
6	(United States)	Scott Caldwell	0	0	0	0	0	0	0	0	0	0	0	0	0	0	0	0	0	0	0	0	0	0	0	0	
11	(United States)	Kelyn Rowe	0	0	0	0	0	0	0	0	0	0	0	0	0	0	0	0	0	0	0	0	0	0	0	0	
12	(Wales)	Andy Dorman	0	0	0	0	0	0	0	0	0	0	0	0	0	0	0	0	0	0	0	0	0	0	0	0	
13	(United States)	Jermaine Jones	0	0	0	0	0	0	0	0	0	0	0	0	0	0	0	0	0	0	0	0	0	0	0	0	
14	(Uruguay)	Diego Fagundez	0	0	0	0	0	0	0	0	0	0	0	0	0	0	0	0	0	0	0	0	0	0	0	0	
16	(Japan)	Daigo Kobayashi	0	0	0	0	0	0	0	0	0	0	0	0	0	0	0	0	0	0	0	0	0	0	0	0	
24	(United States)	Lee Nguyen	0	0	0	0	0	0	0	0	0	0	0	0	0	0	0	0	0	0	0	0	0	0	0	0	
Forwards
7	(United States)	Sean Okoli	0	0	0	0	0	0	0	0	0	0	0	0	0	0	0	0	0	0	0	0	0	0	0	0	
9	(United States)	Charlie Davies	0	0	0	0	0	0	0	0	0	0	0	0	0	0	0	0	0	0	0	0	0	0	0	0	
10	(United States)	Teal Bunbury	0	0	0	0	0	0	0	0	0	0	0	0	0	0	0	0	0	0	0	0	0	0	0	0	
17	(United States)	Juan Agudelo	0	0	0	0	0	0	0	0	0	0	0	0	0	0	0	0	0	0	0	0	0	0	0	0	
27	(Honduras)	Jerry Bengtson	0	0	0	0	0	0	0	0	0	0	0	0	0	0	0	0	0	0	0	0	0	0	0	0	

=== Goalkeeper statistics ===
No.	Nat.	Player	Total							MLS regular season							MLS Cup Playoffs							U.S. Open Cup							Ref.
No.	Nat.	Player	App.	Min.	GA	GAA	W	D	L	App.	Min.	GA	GAA	W	D	L	App.	Min.	GA	GAA	W	D	L	App.	Min.	GA	GAA	W	D	L	Ref.
18	(United States)	Brad Knighton	0	0	0	0	0	0	0	0	0	0	0	0	0	0	0	0	0	—	0	0	0	0	0	0	0	0	0	0	
22	(United States)	Bobby Shuttleworth	0	0	0	0	0	0	0	0	0	0	0	0	0	0	0	0	0	—	0	0	0	0	0	0	0	0	0	0	

== Kits ==
Home

Like all Major League Soccer teams, the 2015 New England Revolution kits are produced by adidas. New England continue wearing the same home kits as in 2014, however the away kit, which was introduced at an event on March 3, broke from the traditional monochromatic white for away kits and featured a red shirt. UnitedHealth Group#UnitedHealthcare continued their four-year relationship with the club as their jersey sponsor.

Type	Shirt	Shorts	Socks	First appearance / Info
Home	Navy	White	Navy	March 8, 2014 (with Navy shorts)
Away	Red and White	Red	Red	April 4, 2015
