= 2013 New England Revolution season =

New England Revolution
2013 season
- Owner: Robert Kraft
- Head coach: Jay Heaps
- Major League Soccer: Conference: 3rd Overall: 7th
- MLS Cup: Conference Semifinals
- U.S. Open Cup: Quarterfinals
- Desert Diamond Cup: 3rd
- Top goalscorer: League: Fagundez (13); All: Fagundez (13)
- Highest home attendance: 26,548 vs. Columbus Crew (October 19; MLS Regular Season)
- Lowest home attendance: 8,040 vs. Real Salt Lake (May 8 MLS Regular Season)
- Average home league attendance: 14,861
Home colors	Away colors

The 2013 New England Revolution season was the team's eighteenth year of existence, all in Major League Soccer. The team also participated in the Desert Diamond Cup and U.S. Open Cup. The season began with a 1-0 win at the Chicago Fire on March 9 and concluded with a 1-0 win at Columbus Crew on October 27. That victory saw the Revolution make the playoffs for the first time since the 2009 season. The team lost 4-3 on aggregate to eventual champions Sporting Kansas City in the Conference Semifinals of the 2013 MLS Cup Playoffs.

== Squad ==
=== Roster ===
As of May 28, 2013

No.	Pos.	Name	Age	Since	App	Goals	Previous team
1	GK	(United States) Matt Reis	51	2003	245	0	(United States) Los Angeles Galaxy
22	GK	(United States) Bobby Shuttleworth	39	2009	30	0	(United States) University of Buffalo
31	GK	(United States) Luis Soffner	36	2013	0	0	(United States) Indiana University
2	DF	(United States) Andrew Farrell	34	2013	11	0	(United States) University of Louisville
5	DF	(United States) A.J. Soares	37	2011	65	3	(United States) University of California
8	DF/MF	(United States) Chris Tierney	40	2008	111	5	(United States) University of Virginia
15	DF	(United States) Stephen McCarthy	38	2011	56	2	(United States) University of North Carolina
23	DF	(Portugal) José Gonçalves (c)	40	2013	12	0	(Switzerland) FC Sion
25	DF	(United States) Darrius Barnes	39	2009	94	1	(United States) Duke University
30	DF	(United States) Kevin Alston	38	2009	117	0	(United States) Indiana University
6	MF	(United States) Scott Caldwell (HGP)	35	2013	7	0	(United States) University of Akron
7	MF	(Colombia) Juan Toja	41	2012	9	0	(Greece) Aris
11	MF	(United States) Kelyn Rowe	34	2012	42	3	(United States) UCLA
12	MF	(Wales) Andy Dorman	44	2013	118	17	(England) Crystal Palace
13	MF	(United States) Ryan Guy	40	2011	41	4	(Republic of Ireland) St Patrick's Athletic
19	MF	(United States) Clyde Simms	44	2012	36	0	(United States) D.C. United
24	MF	(United States) Lee Nguyen	39	2012	43	6	(Vietnam) Becamex Binh Duong
33	MF	(United States) Donnie Smith	36	2013	1	0	(United States) University of North Carolina-Charlotte
9	FW	(United States) Chad Barrett	41	2013	3	0	(United States) Los Angeles Galaxy
10	FW	(United States) Juan Agudelo	33	2013	2	2	(United States) Chivas USA
14	FW	(Uruguay) Diego Fagundez (HGP)	31	2011	36	8	(United States) New England Revolution Academy
27	FW	(Honduras) Jerry Bengtson (DP)	39	2012	24	4	(Honduras) Motagua
39	FW	(France) Saer Sene	39	2012	32	11	(Germany) FC Bayern Munich II
92	FW	(Republic of the Congo) Dimitry Imbongo	36	2012	13	1	(Germany) TSV 1860 München II

=== Out on loan ===
No.	Position	Nation	Player
18	FW	USA	Matt Horth (on loan at Rochester Rhinos)
26	MF	USA	Gabe Latigue (on loan at Rochester Rhinos)
16	DF	USA	Bilal Duckett (on loan at Rochester Rhinos)
3	DF	USA	Tyler Polak (on loan at Rochester Rhinos)

=== Coaching Staff and Executives ===
Position	Staff	Nation
Head coach	Jay Heaps	United States
Assistant coach	Jay Miller	United States
Goalkeepers Coach	Remi Roy	Canada
Strength and conditioning Coach	Nick Downing	United States
Soccer Operations Manager	Jason Gove	United States
Equipment Manager	Scott Emmens	United States
Analyst	Tim Crawford	United States

Source: Coaching staff

Position/Title	Name
Investor/Operator	Robert Kraft
Investor/Operator	Jonathan Kraft
President	Brian Bilello
General Manager	Mike Burns
Director of Communications	Lizz Summers
Director of Marketing	Cathal Conlon
VP of Ticket Sales and Customer Service	James Mullins
Digital Content Manager	Jason Dalrymple
Director of Youth Development/Head Coach, Under-16s	Bryan Scales
Revolution Academy director & Youth Teams Coordinator	Deven Apajee
Head coach, Under-18s	John Frederick
Program Development Manager/Assistant Coach, Under-16s	Gary Hall
Technical director	Ross Duncan
Head Athletic Trainer	Evan Allen
Head Team Physician	Scott Martin, M.D.
Chiropractors	Michael Weinman, D.C.
Supervising Producer/Play by Play Analyst	Brad Feldman
Color Analyst	Jeff Causey

Source: Staff

=== Facilities ===
Ground (capacity and dimensions)	Gillette Stadium (22,385 / 104x68m)

Source: Facilities

== Player movement ==
=== Transfers ===
==== In ====
No.	Pos.	Player	Acquired from	Fee/notes	Date signed/acquired	Source
12	MF	(Wales) Andy Dorman	(England) Crystal Palace	Undisclosed	November 15, 2012	
4	MF	(Mali) Kalifa Cissé	(England) Bristol City	Free Transfer	November 19, 2012	
9	FW	(United States) Chad Barrett	(United States) Los Angeles Galaxy	Selected in the 2012 MLS Re-Entry Draft	December 14, 2012	
6	MF	(United States) Scott Caldwell	(United States) Akron University	Signed as a Home Grown Player	December 21, 2012	
23	DF	(Portugal) José Gonçalves	(Switzerland) FC Sion	Acquired on Loan with Option to Buy	January 3, 2013	
2	DF	(United States) Andrew Farrell	(United States) University of Louisville	Selected 1st Overall in the 2013 MLS SuperDraft	January 17, 2013	
33	MF	(United States) Donnie Smith	(United States) UNC-Charlotte	Selected 21st Overall in the 2013 MLS SuperDraft	January 17, 2013	
31	GK	(United States) Luis Soffner	(United States) Indiana University	Selected 36th Overall in the 2013 MLS SuperDraft	January 17, 2013	
18	FW	(United States) Matt Horth	(United States) Atlanta Silverbacks	Free Transfer	January 25, 2013	
16	DF	(United States) Bilal Duckett	(United States) Harrisburg City Islanders	Free Transfer	February 11, 2013	
26	MF	(United States) Gabe Latigue	(United States) Elon University	Selected 61st overall in the 2013 MLS Supplemental Draft	March 1, 2013	
10	FW	(United States) Juan Agudelo	(United States) Chivas USA	Acquired via trade in exchange for Allocation money	May 7, 2013	

==== Out ====
No.	Pos.	Player	Destination club	Fee/notes	Date signed/acquired	Source
6	MF	(United States) Michael Roach	Unattached	Waived	November 19, 2012	
7	MF	(United States) Blair Gavin	Unattached	Contract Option Declined, 2012 MLS Re-Entry Draft: Not selected	November 30, 2012	
12	DF	(Germany) Florian Lechner	Unattached	Waived	November 19, 2012	
23	DF	(United States) Blake Brettschneider	(United States) Rochester Rhinos	Waived	November 19, 2012	
99	FW	(United States) Alec Purdie	Unattached	Waived	November 19, 2012	
17	MF	(The Gambia) Sainey Nyassi	(United States) D.C. United	Waived	May 16, 2013	

== Squad statistics ==
=== Individual ===
No.	Pos	Nat	Player	Total		Major League Soccer		U.S. Open Cup		MLS Cup Playoffs	
No.	Pos	Nat	Player	Apps	Goals	Apps	Goals	Apps	Goals	Apps	Goals
1	GK	(United States) USA	Matt Reis	17	-18	12+0	-8	3+0	-6	2+0	-4
2	DF	(United States) USA	Andrew Farrell	35	0	32+0	0	1+0	0	2+0	0
3	DF	(United States) USA	Tyler Polak	2	0	0+0	0	1+1	0	0+0	0
5	DF	(United States) USA	A. J. Soares	23	1	17+1	1	3+0	0	2+0	0
6	MF	(United States) USA	Scott Caldwell	33	0	23+6	0	1+1	0	0+2	0
7	MF	(Colombia) COL	Juan Toja	19	2	11+7	1	1+0	1	0+0	0
8	DF	(United States) USA	Chris Tierney	31	2	26+3	1	0+2	1	0+0	0
9	FW	(United States) USA	Chad Barrett	24	3	8+11	2	3+0	1	0+2	0
10	FW	(United States) USA	Juan Agudelo	18	7	11+3	7	0+2	0	2+0	0
11	FW	(United States) USA	Kelyn Rowe	38	12	26+7	7	2+1	4	2+0	1
12	MF	(Wales) WAL	Andy Dorman	16	2	3+8	0	3+0	1	2+0	1
13	FW	(Guam) GUM	Ryan Guy	12	1	8+3	1	1+0	0	0+0	0
14	MF	(Uruguay) URU	Diego Fagúndez	34	13	28+3	13	1+0	0	2+0	0
15	DF	(United States) USA	Stephen McCarthy	19	0	17+2	0	0+0	0	0+0	0
16	DF	(United States) USA	Bilal Duckett	1	0	1+0	0	0+0	0	0+0	0
17	DF	(Jamaica) JAM	O'Brian Woodbine	0	0	0+0	0	0+0	0	0+0	0
18	FW	(United States) USA	Matt Horth	0	0	0+0	0	0+0	0	0+0	0
19	MF	(United States) USA	Clyde Simms	10	0	9+1	0	0+0	0	0+0	0
22	GK	(United States) USA	Bobby Shuttleworth	23	-30	22+1	-30	0+0	0	0+0	0
23	DF	(Portugal) POR	José Gonçalves (on loan from Sion)	37	2	34+0	2	1+0	0	2+0	0
24	MF	(United States) USA	Lee Nguyen	36	4	32+1	4	0+1	0	2+0	0
25	DF	(United States) USA	Darrius Barnes	11	0	4+2	0	3+0	0	2+0	0
26	DF	(United States) USA	Gabe Latigue	2	0	0+0	0	2+0	0	0+0	0
27	FW	(Honduras) HON	Jerry Bengtson	18	2	12+4	1	0+1	1	0+1	0
30	MF	(United States) USA	Kevin Alston	9	0	6+3	0	0+	0	0+0	0
33	FW	(United States) USA	Donnie Smith	2	0	1+0	0	1+0	0	0+0	0
36	GK	(United States) USA	Luis Soffner	0	0	0+0	0	0+0	0	0+0	0
39	FW	(France) FRA	Saër Sène	25	5	14+10	5	1+0	0	0+0	0
92	FW	(Democratic Republic of the Congo) COD	Dimitry Imbongo	26	5	11+10	3	3+0	1	2+0	1
99	FW	(United States) USA	Charlie Davies (on loan from Randers FC)	4	0	0+4	0	0+0	0	0+0	0
	MF	(Mali) MLI	Kalifa Cissé	8	0	6+0	0	2+0	0	0+0	0
	MF	(The Gambia) GAM	Sainey Nyassi	0	0	0+0	0	0+0	0	0+0	0

Updated to match played December 3, 2013
Source: New England Revolution 2013

Italic: denotes player is no longer with team

=== Top scorers ===
Includes all competitive matches. The list is sorted by shirt number when total goals are equal.

Ran	No.	Pos	Nat	Name	Major League Soccer	U.S. Open Cup	Total
1	14	FW	(Uruguay)	Diego Fagundez	5	0	5
2	11	MF	(United States)	Kelyn Rowe	1	2	3
3	9	FW	(United States)	Chad Barrett	1	1	2
3	10	FW	(United States)	Juan Agudelo	2	0	2
3	24	MF	(United States)	Lee Nguyen	2	0	2
3	27	FW	(Honduras)	Jerry Bengtson	1	1	2
4	12	MF	(Wales)	Andy Dorman	0	1	1
4	13	MF	(United States)	Ryan Guy	1	0	1
4	39	FW	(France)	Saër Sène	1	0	1
				TOTALS	14	5	19

Last updated: June 8, 2013
Source: Revolution Goal Scorers

Italic: denotes no longer with club.

=== Top assists ===
Includes all competitive matches. The list is sorted by shirt number when total goals are equal.

Ran	No.	Pos	Nat	Name	Major League Soccer	U.S. Open Cup	Total
1	11	MF	(United States)	Kelyn Rowe	5	1	6
2	8	DF	(United States)	Chris Tierney	2	0	2
2	9	FW	(United States)	Chad Barrett	1	1	2
2	14	FW	(Uruguay)	Diego Fagundez	2	0	2
3	2	DF	(United States)	Andrew Farrell	1	0	1
3	19	MF	(United States)	Clyde Simms	1	0	1
3	24	MF	(United States)	Lee Nguyen	1	0	1
3	25	DF	(United States)	Darrius Barnes	0	1	1
3	39	FW	(France)	Saër Sène	1	0	1
				TOTALS	14	3	17

Last updated: June 8, 2013
Source: Revolution's Assists

Italic: denotes no longer with club.

=== Top Shutouts ===
Includes all competitive matches. The list is sorted by shirt number when total goals are equal.

Ran	No.	Pos	Nat	Name	Major League Soccer	U.S. Open Cup	Total
1	22	GK	(United States)	Bobby Shuttleworth	7	0	7
2	1	GK	(United States)	Matt Reis	2	0	2
3	36	GK	(United States)	Luis Soffner	0	0	0
				TOTALS	9	0	9

Last updated: June 8, 2013
Source: Revolution's Clean Sheets

Italic: denotes no longer with club.

== Competitions ==
=== Preseason ===
January 25, 2013	New England Revolution	0–0	Sporting KC	Casa Grande, Arizona
13:00 EDT	Cissé (yellow card) 4'	Report	(yellow card) 12' Saad	Stadium: Grande Sports World; Referee: Jair Marrufo

January 29, 2013	New England Revolution	1–4	Vancouver Whitecaps FC	Casa Grande, Arizona
20:00 EDT	Mattocks 2', 5', 15'; Miller 65' (pen.)	Report	11' (pen.) Tierney	Stadium: Grande Sports World

=== Desert Diamond Cup ===
==== Standings ====
Pos	Team	Pld	W	L	D	GF	GA	GD	Pts
1	Seattle Sounders FC	3	3	0	0	6	1	+5	9
2	Real Salt Lake	3	1	1	1	6	6	0	4
3	New England Revolution	3	1	2	0	5	6	−1	3
4	New York Red Bulls	3	0	2	1	3	7	−4	1

=== Matches ===
February 13, 2013 Group	Seattle Sounders FC	2–0	New England Revolution	Tucson, Arizona
19:00 EDT	González (yellow card) 18'; Johnson (yellow card) 25', (goal) 45'; Evans 27' (pen.); Alonso (yellow card) 32'; Traoré (yellow card) 43'; Burch (red card) 79'; Bowen (yellow card) 82'	Report	Gonçalves (yellow card) 25'; Nyassi (red card) 79'	Stadium: Kino Stadium; Referee: Juan Guzman

February 16, 2013 Group	New England Revolution	3–1	New York Red Bulls	Tucson, Arizona
20:00 EDT	Nguyen 53' (pen.); Bengtson 58'; Caldwell (yellow card) 84'; Jesic 88'	Report	Juninho 11'; Robles (yellow card) 65'	Stadium: Kino Stadium; Attendance: 3,211; Referee: Ricardo Salazar

February 20, 2013 Group	New England Revolution	2–3	Real Salt Lake	Tucson, Arizona
20:00 EDT	Dorman 50' (yellow card) 67'; Duckett (yellow card) 54'; Soares 57'	Report	Sandoval 22'; Álvarez (yellow card) 69'; Saborío 88'; Stephenson 90+'	Stadium: Kino Stadium

February 23, 2013 3rd Place	New England Revolution	2–0	New York Red Bulls	Tucson, Arizona
19:00 EDT	Nguyen 4' (pen.); Bengtson 36'; Toja (yellow card) 45'	Report	Espindola (yellow card) 17'; Miller (yellow card) 45'; Cahill (yellow card) 65'	Stadium: Kino Stadium

=== Major League Soccer ===
Kickoff times are in EDT.

==== Standings ====
===== Eastern Conference =====
Pos	Team	Pld	W	L	T	GF	GA	GD	Pts	Qualification
1	New York Red Bulls	34	17	9	8	58	41	+17	59	MLS Cup Conference Semifinals
2	Sporting Kansas City	34	17	10	7	47	30	+17	58	MLS Cup Conference Semifinals
3	New England Revolution	34	14	11	9	49	38	+11	51	MLS Cup Conference Semifinals
4	Houston Dynamo	34	14	11	9	41	41	0	51	MLS Cup Knockout Round
5	Montreal Impact	34	14	13	7	50	49	+1	49	MLS Cup Knockout Round
6	Chicago Fire	34	14	13	7	47	52	−5	49	
7	Philadelphia Union	34	12	12	10	42	44	−2	46	
8	Columbus Crew	34	12	17	5	42	46	−4	41	
9	Toronto FC	34	6	17	11	30	47	−17	29	
10	D.C. United	34	3	24	7	22	59	−37	16	

Source: MLS

===== Overall table =====
Note: the table below has no impact on playoff qualification and is used solely for determining host of the MLS Cup, certain CCL spots, and 2014 MLS draft. The conference tables are the sole determinant for teams qualifying to the playoffs

Pos	Team	Pld	W	L	T	GF	GA	GD	Pts	Qualification
1	New York Red Bulls (S)	34	17	9	8	58	41	+17	59	CONCACAF Champions League
2	Sporting Kansas City (C)	34	17	10	7	47	30	+17	58	CONCACAF Champions League
3	Portland Timbers	34	14	5	15	54	33	+21	57	CONCACAF Champions League
4	Real Salt Lake	34	16	10	8	57	41	+16	56	
5	LA Galaxy	34	15	11	8	53	38	+15	53	
6	Seattle Sounders FC	34	15	12	7	42	42	0	52	
7	New England Revolution	34	14	11	9	49	38	+11	51	
8	Colorado Rapids	34	14	11	9	45	38	+7	51	
9	Houston Dynamo	34	14	11	9	41	41	0	51	
10	San Jose Earthquakes	34	14	11	9	35	42	−7	51	
11	Montreal Impact	34	14	13	7	50	49	+1	49	CONCACAF Champions League
12	Chicago Fire	34	14	13	7	47	52	−5	49	
13	Vancouver Whitecaps FC	34	13	12	9	53	45	+8	48	
14	Philadelphia Union	34	12	12	10	42	44	−2	46	
15	FC Dallas	34	11	12	11	48	52	−4	44	
16	Columbus Crew	34	12	17	5	42	46	−4	41	
17	Toronto FC	34	6	17	11	30	47	−17	29	
18	Chivas USA	34	6	20	8	30	67	−37	26	
19	D.C. United	34	3	24	7	22	59	−37	16	CONCACAF Champions League

Source: MLS
Rules for classification: 1) points; 2) head-to-head record; 3) goal difference; 4) number of goals scored
(C) MLS Cup Champion; (S) Supporters' Shield

===== Results summary =====
Overall								Home						Away					
Pld	Pts	W	L	T	GF	GA	GD	W	L	T	GF	GA	GD	W	L	T	GF	GA	GD
23	30	8	9	6	27	10	+17	4	4	3	14	7	+7	4	5	3	13	3	+10

Source: MLS Results
Pld = Matches played; Pts = Points; W = Matches won; T = Matches tied; L = Matches lost; GF = Goals for; GA = Goals against; GD = Goal difference

===== Results by round =====
Round	1	2	3	4	5	6	7	8	9	10	11	12	13	14	15	16	17	18	19	20	21	22	23	24	25	26	27	28	29	30	31	32	33	34
Stadium	A	A	H	H	A	A	H	A	H	H	A	H	H	H	A	A	H	H	A	A	A	H	A	H	H	A	H	A	H	H	A	A	H	A
Result	W	L	D	L	D	L	W	D	L	D	W	W	W	D	L	D	W	L	L	W	W	L	L	W	W	D	L	L	W	D	D	W	W	W

Source: MLS Results
A = Away; H = Home; W = Win; D = Draw; L = Loss

==== Matches ====
March 9, 2013 Match 1	Chicago Fire	0–1	New England Revolution	Bridgeview, Illinois
19:30	Larentowicz (yellow card) 55'	Report	Bengtson 62'; Fagundez (yellow card) 86'	Stadium: Toyota Park; Attendance: 13,242; Referee: Hilario Grajeda

March 16, 2013 Match 2	Philadelphia Union	1–0	New England Revolution	Chester, Pennsylvania
17:00	McInerney 76'; Okugo (yellow card) 42'; Parke (yellow card) 92'	Report	Soares (yellow card) 27'; Shuttleworth (yellow card) 84'	Stadium: PPL Park; Attendance: 15,689; Referee: Jose Carlos Rivero

March 23, 2013 Match 3	New England Revolution	0–0	Sporting Kansas City	Foxborough, Massachusetts
16:00		Report	Jerome (yellow card) 30'; Feilhaber (yellow card) 71'	Stadium: Gillette Stadium; Attendance: 12,215; Referee: Edvin Jurisevic

March 30, 2013 Match 4	New England Revolution	0–1	FC Dallas	Foxborough, Massachusetts
16:00	Rowe (yellow card) 64'	Report	Ferreira (yellow card) 51'; Perez 87'	Stadium: Gillette Stadium; Attendance: 10,284; Referee: David Gantar

April 13, 2013 Match 5	Seattle Sounders FC	0–0	New England Revolution	Seattle, Washington
16:00		Report		Stadium: CenturyLink Field; Attendance: 38,323; Referee: Chris Penso

April 20, 2013 Match 6	New York Red Bulls	4–1	New England Revolution	Harrison, New Jersey
19:00	McCarthy 4'; Espíndola 8'; Robles (yellow card) 78'; Henry 82'; Steele 89'	Report	Barklage 6' (o.g.); Cissé (yellow card) 35'	Stadium: Red Bull Arena

April 27, 2013 Match 7	New England Revolution	2–0	Philadelphia Union	Foxborough, Massachusetts
19:30	Fagundez 61'; Nguyen 71'	Report	Kléberson (yellow card) 82'	Stadium: Gillette Stadium; Attendance: 18,383; Referee: Baldomero Toledo

May 2, 2013 Match 8	Portland Timbers	0–0	New England Revolution	Portland, Oregon
22:30	Wallace (yellow card) 70'	Report		Stadium: JELD-WEN Field; Attendance: 20,674; Referee: Jair Marrufo

May 8, 2013 Match 9	New England Revolution	1–2	Real Salt Lake	Foxborough, Massachusetts
20:00	Guy 51'; Nguyen (yellow card) 59'; Toja (yellow card) 74'	Report	Salcedo (yellow card) 35'; Sandoval 77'; García 89'; Beltran (yellow card) 91'	Stadium: Gillette Stadium; Attendance: 8,040; Referee: Jose Carlos Rivero

May 11, 2013 Match 10	New England Revolution	1–1	New York Red Bulls	Foxborough, Massachusetts
19:30	Cissé (yellow card) 19'; Fagundez 54'; Bengston (yellow card) 76'	Report	Sam 55'	Stadium: Gillette Stadium; Attendance: 16,440; Referee: Ricardo Salazar

May 18, 2013 Match 11	Houston Dynamo	0–2	New England Revolution	Houston, Texas
20:30	García (yellow card) 26'; Boswell (red card) 40'; Sarkodie (yellow card) 58'	Report	Imbongo (red card) 40'; McCarthy (yellow card) 47'; Fagundez 51'; Shuttleworth (yellow card) 82'; Agudelo 84'	Stadium: BBVA Compass

May 25, 2013 Match 12	New England Revolution	2–0	Toronto FC	Foxborough, Massachusetts
19:30	Fagundez 23'; Toja (yellow card) 39'; Nguyen (yellow card) 80'; Sène (yellow card) 88'; Agudelo 93'	Report	O'Dea (yellow card) 29'; Laba (yellow card) 68'; Henry (yellow card) 80'; Silva (yellow card) 91'	Stadium: Gillette Stadium; Attendance: 10,711; Referee: Ismail Elfath

June 2, 2013 Match 13	New England Revolution	5–0	Los Angeles Galaxy	Foxborough, Massachusetts
16:30	Sène 33'; Nguyen 71'; Rowe (yellow card) 75' (goal) 94'; Fagundez 87'; Barrett 91'	Report	Donovan (yellow card) 72'; Sarvas (yellow card) 93'	Stadium: Gillette Stadium; Attendance: 19,120; Referee: Fotis Bazakos

June 8, 2013 Match 14	New England Revolution	0–0	D.C. United	Foxborough, Massachusetts
19:30	Juan Toja (yellow card) 49'; Lee Nguyen (yellow card) 78'	Report	Chris Korb (yellow card) 72'; Ethan White (yellow card) 85'	Stadium: Gillette Stadium; Attendance: 14,163; Referee: Ted Unkel

June 15, 2013 Match 15	Vancouver Whitecaps FC	4–3	New England Revolution	Vancouver, British Columbia
22:00	Sanvezzo 25' (pen.); Miller 39', 68'; Harvey 43'; Tebert (yellow card) 61'; Mitchell (yellow card) 69'; Manneh (yellow card) 76'	Report	Agudelo 10'; Caldwell (yellow card) 14'; Rowe 20'; Farrell (red card) 23'; Tierney (yellow card) 31'; Imbongo 84'	Stadium: BC Place; Attendance: 20,116; Referee: Juan Guzman

June 29, 2013 Match 16	Chivas USA	1–1	New England Revolution	Carson, California
22:30	Courtois 18'; Alvarez (yellow card) 71'; Bowen (yellow card) 74'	Report	Simms (yellow card) 31'; Barrett 88'; Nguyen (yellow card) 90'	Stadium: StubHub Center; Attendance: 7,319; Referee: Elias Bazakos

July 6, 2013 Match 17	New England Revolution	2–0	San Jose Earthquakes	Foxborough, Massachusetts
7:30 PM EDT	Sène 13'; Farrell (yellow card) 37'; Imbongo 78'; Imbongo (yellow card) 94'	Report	Martínez (yellow card) 35'; Gargan (yellow card) 83'	Stadium: Gillette Stadium; Attendance: 13,732; Referee: Jose Carlos Rivero

July 13, 2013 Match 18	New England Revolution	1–2	Houston Dynamo	Foxborough, Massachusetts
19:30	Sène 55'; Farrell (yellow card) 55'; Imbongo (red card) 82'	Report	Moffat 49'; Brunner (yellow card) 69'; Moffat 79'	Stadium: Gillette Stadium; Attendance: 14,357; Referee: Armando Villarreal

July 17, 2013 Match 19	Colorado Rapids	2–1	New England Revolution	Commerce City, Colorado
21:00	LaBrocca 62'; Gonçalves 67' (o.g.)	Report	Toja 15'; Gonçalves (yellow card) 74'	Stadium: Dick's Sporting Goods Park; Attendance: 13,833; Referee: Allen Chapman

July 20, 2013 Match 20	Columbus Crew	0–2	New England Revolution	Columbus, Ohio
19:30	O'Rourke (yellow card) 45+1'; Anor (yellow card) 60'	Report	Farrell (yellow card) 31'; Soares (yellow card) 31'; Gonçalves 91'; Fagundez 94'	Stadium: Columbus Crew Stadium; Attendance: 19,323; Referee: Edvin Jurisevic

July 27, 2013 Match 21	D.C. United	1–2	New England Revolution	Washington, D.C.
19:00				Stadium: RFK Stadium

August 4, 2013 Match 22	New England Revolution	0–1	Toronto FC	Foxborough, Massachusetts
19:30				Stadium: Gillette Stadium

August 10, 2013 Match 23	Sporting Kansas City	3–0	New England Revolution	Kansas City, Kansas
20:30				Stadium: LIVESTRONG Sporting Park

August 17, 2013 Match 24	New England Revolution	2–0	Chicago Fire	Foxborough, Massachusetts
19:30				Stadium: Gillette Stadium

August 25, 2013 Match 25	New England Revolution	5–1	Philadelphia Union	Foxborough, Massachusetts
19:30				Stadium: Gillette Stadium

August 30, 2013 Match 26	Toronto FC	1–1	New England Revolution	Toronto, Ontario
19:00				Stadium: BMO Field

September 7, 2013 Match 27	New England Revolution	2–4	Montreal Impact	Foxborough, Massachusetts
19:30				Stadium: Gillette Stadium

September 14, 2013 Match 28	Chicago Fire	3–2	New England Revolution	Bridgeview, Illinois
20:30				Stadium: Toyota Park

September 21, 2013 Match 29	New England Revolution	2–1	D.C. United	Foxborough, Massachusetts
19:30				Stadium: Gillette Stadium

September 28, 2013 Match 30	New England Revolution	1–1	Houston Dynamo	Foxborough, Massachusetts
19:30				Stadium: Gillette Stadium

October 5, 2013 Match 31	New York Red Bulls	2–2	New England Revolution	Harrison, New Jersey
19:00				Stadium: Red Bull Arena

October 12, 2013 Match 32	Montreal Impact	0–1	New England Revolution	Montreal, Quebec
14:30				Stadium: Stade Saputo

October 19, 2013 Match 33	New England Revolution	3–2	Columbus Crew	Foxborough, Massachusetts
19:30				Stadium: Gillette Stadium

October 27, 2013 Match 34	Columbus Crew	0–1	New England Revolution	Columbus, Ohio
16:00	Jairo Arrieta (yellow card) 25'; Agustin Viana (yellow card) 57'; Dominic Oduro (red card)	Report	Juan Agudelo 28', (yellow card) 89'; Matt Reis (yellow card) 84'	Stadium: Columbus Crew Stadium; Attendance: 17,505; Referee: Hilario Grajeda

==== MLS Cup Playoffs ====
===== Bracket =====
Knockout
E4	Houston	3
E5	Montreal	0
W4	Seattle	2
W5	Colorado	0

Conference semifinals
E1	New York	2	1	3
E4	Houston (a.e.t.)	2	2	4
Eastern Conference
E2	Kansas City (a.e.t.)	1	3	4
E3	New England	2	1	3
W1	Portland	2	3	5
W4	Seattle	1	2	3
Western Conference
W2	Salt Lake (a.e.t.)	0	2	2
W3	Los Angeles	1	0	1

Conference finals
E4	Houston	0	1	1
E2	Kansas City	0	2	2
W1	Portland	2	0	2
W2	Salt Lake	4	1	5

MLS Cup
E2	Kansas City (p)	1 (7)
W2	Salt Lake	1 (6)

===== Results =====
====== Conference semifinals ======
November 2, 2013 1st Leg	New England Revolution	2–1	Sporting Kansas City	Gillette Stadium, Foxborough
19:00 CDT	Dorman 55'; Rowe 67'; Imbongo (yellow card) 69'; Nguyen (yellow card) 84'; Soares (yellow card) 90'; Barrett (yellow card) 92+'	Report	Sinovic (yellow card) 53'; Collin 69' (yellow card) 76'; Bunbury (yellow card) 71'	Attendance: 15,164; Referee: Ismail Elfath

November 6, 2013 2nd Leg	Sporting Kansas City	3–1 (a.e.t.)	New England Revolution	Sporting Park, Kansas City
20:00 CST	Myers (yellow card) 19'; Collin 41'; Sinovic 79'; Bieler 113'	Report	Barnes (yellow card) 19'; Caldwell (yellow card) 88'; Imbongo 70'	Attendance: 19,031; Referee: Mark Geiger

Sporting Kansas City won 4-3 on aggregate

=== U.S. Open Cup ===
May 28, 2013 Third round	Rochester Rhinos	1–5	New England Revolution	Rochester, New York
19:35 EDT	LaBauex (yellow card) 44'; McFayden 77', (red card) 91'	Recap	Rowe 23', 64'; Dorman 53'; Bengtson 54', (yellow card) 61'; Barrett 82'	Stadium: Sahlen's Stadium

June 12, 2013 Fourth round	New England Revolution	4–2	New York Red Bulls	Boston, Massachusetts
19:30 EDT	Rowe 5', 37'; Imbongo 50'; Cissé (yellow card) 76'; Barnes (yellow card) 78'; Tierney 86'	Report	Barklage (yellow card) 10' (yellow-red card) 91'; Espindola (yellow card) 24'; Espindola 30'; McCarty (yellow card) 45'; Holgersson (yellow card) 55'; Steele 61'	Stadium: Soldiers Field Soccer Stadium; Attendance: 2500; Referee: Matthew Foerster

June 26, 2013 Quarterfinals	D.C. United	3–1	New England Revolution	Boyds, Maryland
20:00 EDT	Pontius 45'; Riley (yellow card) 52'; De Rosario 69'; Pajoy 87' (pen.)	Report	Dorman (yellow card) 47'; Toja 52'; Imbongo (yellow card) 58'	Stadium: Maryland SoccerPlex; Attendance: 2,918; Referee: Edwin Jurisevic

== Miscellany ==
=== Allocation ranking ===
New England is in the #5 position in the MLS Allocation Ranking. The allocation ranking is the mechanism used to determine which MLS club has first priority to acquire a U.S. National Team player who signs with MLS after playing abroad, or a former MLS player who returns to the league after having gone to a club abroad for a transfer fee. A ranking can be traded, provided that part of the compensation received in return is another club's ranking.

=== International roster spots ===
New England has 8 MLS International Roster Slots for use in the 2013 season. Each club in Major League Soccer is allocated 8 international roster spots and no New England trades have been reported.
