= 2013 MLS SuperDraft =

College draft for soccer teams

General information
- Sport: Soccer
- Date: January 17, 2013
- Time: 12:00 p.m. ET
- Location: Indianapolis, Indiana
- Network: ESPN3

Overview
- 38 total selections
- First selection: Andrew Farrell, New England Revolution
- Most selections: 2 teams (4 selections)
- Fewest selections: 6 teams (1 selection)

The 2013 MLS SuperDraft was the fourteenth SuperDraft presented by Major League Soccer. The draft took place on January 17, 2013, in Indianapolis, Indiana at the Indiana Convention Center.

The Colorado Rapids enjoyed returns from the 2013 draft, with its two first-round draft picks Dillon Powers and Deshorn Brown finishing first and second respectively in 2013 rookie of the year voting. The 2013 season also showed the ability of MLS teams to develop young talent without turning to the draft, as homegrown players DeAndre Yedlin and Gyasi Zardes finished third and fourth respectively in rookie of the year voting.

== Selection order ==
The official selection order was announced by Major League Soccer on December 6, 2012:

1. The nine clubs which did not qualify for the playoffs received picks #1 through #9 (in reverse order of season points);
2. The two clubs eliminated in the Knockout round of playoffs received picks #10 and #11 (in reverse order of season points);
3. The four clubs eliminated in the Conference Semifinals received picks #12 through #15 (in reverse order of season points);
4. The two clubs eliminated in the Conference Finals received picks #16 and #17 (in reverse order of season points);
5. The club which lost 2012 MLS Cup received pick #18;
6. The club which won 2012 MLS Cup received pick #19.

This selection order pertained to all rounds of the MLS SuperDraft. The same order was followed in the 2013 MLS Supplemental Draft held 5 days later.

*	Denotes player who has been selected for an MLS Best XI team

=== Round 1 ===
Any player marked with a * is part of the Generation Adidas program.

Pick #	MLS team	Player	Position	Affiliation
1	New England Revolution (Note: #1: Toronto FC → New England Revolution. January 16, 2013: New England Revolution acquired this selection from Toronto FC in exchange for the #4 selection in the first round and allocation money.)	(United States) Andrew Farrell*	Defender	Louisville; River City Rovers
2	Chivas USA	(United States) Carlos Alvarez	Midfielder	Connecticut
3	Toronto FC (Note: #3: Portland Timbers → Toronto FC. December 12, 2012: Toronto FC acquired this selection, goalkeeper Joe Bendik, and allocation money from Portland Timbers in exchange for forward Ryan Johnson and goalkeeper Miloš Kocić.)	(Canada) Kyle Bekker	Midfielder	Boston College
4	Vancouver Whitecaps FC (Note: #4: New England Revolution → Toronto FC → Vancouver Whitecaps FC. January 16, 2013: Toronto FC acquired this selection and allocation money from New England Revolution in exchange for the #1 selection in the first round. On January 17, 2013, this selection was traded to Vancouver Whitecaps FC in exchange for allocation money and the #10 pick in the first round.)	(The Gambia) Kekuta Manneh*	Forward	Austin Aztex
5	Vancouver Whitecaps FC (Note: #5: Philadelphia Union → Vancouver Whitecaps FC. June 26, 2012: Vancouver Whitecaps FC acquired this selection, allocation money, and the #12 position in the MLS Allocation Order from Philadelphia Union in exchange for pick #29 of the SuperDraft and the #1 position in the MLS Allocation Order. Philadelphia used the Allocation pick to select defender Bakary Soumaré.)	(United States) Erik Hurtado	Forward	Santa Clara; Portland Timbers U23s
6	Colorado Rapids	(Jamaica) Deshorn Brown*	Forward	UCF; Reading United
7	FC Dallas	(United States) Walker Zimmerman*	Defender	Furman
8	Montreal Impact	(United States) Blake Smith	Midfielder	New Mexico; Austin Aztex
9	Columbus Crew	(United States) Ryan Finley	Forward	Notre Dame; Reading United
10	Seattle Sounders FC (Note: #10: Vancouver Whitecaps FC → Toronto FC → Seattle Sounders FC. January 17, 2013: Toronto FC acquired this first-round selection and allocation money from Vancouver Whitecaps FC in exchange for the #4 pick in the first round. Later that same day, Seattle Sounders FC acquired this selection in exchange for allocation money and the #16 pick in the first round.)	(El Salvador) Eriq Zavaleta*	Forward	Indiana
11	Colorado Rapids (Note: #11: Chicago Fire → Colorado Rapids. January 16, 2013: Colorado Rapids acquired this selection, allocation money, and a 2013 international roster slot from Chicago Fire in exchange for midfielder Jeff Larentowicz and pick #30 in the SuperDraft.)	(United States) Dillon Powers	Midfielder	Notre Dame; Austin Aztex
12	Real Salt Lake	(United States) John Stertzer	Midfielder	Maryland
13	Houston Dynamo (Note: #13: New York Red Bulls → Portland Timbers → Houston Dynamo. January 12, 2012: Portland Timbers acquired this selection and allocation money from New York Red Bulls in exchange for forward Kenny Cooper. On January 30, 2012, Houston Dynamo acquired this selection in exchange for the MLS rights to forward Kris Boyd.)	(Jamaica) Jason Johnson*	Forward	VCU
14	Sporting Kansas City	(United States) Mikey Lopez*	Midfielder	North Carolina; Orange County Blue Star
15	San Jose Earthquakes	(United States) Tommy Muller	Defender	Georgetown
16	Toronto FC (Note: #16: Seattle Sounders FC → Toronto FC. January 17, 2013: Toronto FC acquired this selection and allocation money from Seattle Sounders FC in exchange for the #10 pick in the first round.)	(Guyana) Emery Welshman	Forward	Oregon State; Portland Timbers U23s
17	D.C. United	(United States) Taylor Kemp	Defender	Maryland; Real Colorado Foxes
18	Montreal Impact (Note: #18: Houston Dynamo → Montreal Impact. February 16, 2012: Montreal Impact acquired a conditional selection in the 2013 SuperDraft, which became this first-round pick, from Houston Dynamo in exchange for forward Brian Ching.)	(United States) Fernando Monge	Midfielder	UCLA; Seattle Sounders FC U-23
19	Los Angeles Galaxy	(United States) Charlie Rugg	Forward	Boston College; Worcester Hydra

=== Round 2 ===
Any player marked with an * is part of the Generation Adidas program.

Pick #	MLS team	Player	Position	Affiliation
20	FC Dallas (Note: #20: Toronto FC → FC Dallas. November 29, 2011: FC Dallas acquired this selection from Toronto FC in exchange for midfielder Jeremy Hall.)	(United States) Ryan Hollingshead	Midfielder	UCLA
21	New England Revolution (Note: #21: Chivas USA → New England Revolution. August 1, 2012: New England Revolution acquired this selection, midfielder Blair Gavin, and allocation money from Chivas USA in exchange for midfielder Shalrie Joseph.)	(United States) Donnie Smith	Forward	Charlotte; Carolina Dynamo
22	New York Red Bulls (Note: #22: Portland Timbers → New York Red Bulls. December 3, 2012: New York Red Bulls acquired this selection and defender Kosuke Kimura from Portland Timbers in exchange for allocation money and the homegrown player rights to defender Bryan Gallego.)	(United States) Ian Christianson	Midfielder	Georgetown; Reading United
23	New England Revolution	(United States) Luke Spencer	Forward	Xavier; Cincinnati Kings
24	Los Angeles Galaxy (Note: #24: Philadelphia Union → Los Angeles Galaxy. February 1, 2012: Los Angeles Galaxy acquired this selection and midfielder Kyle Nakazawa from Philadelphia Union in exchange for use of an international roster slot through December 31, 2012.)	(Ghana) Kofi Opare	Defender	Michigan; Michigan Bucks
25	Colorado Rapids	(United States) Kory Kindle	Defender	CSU Bakerfield; Ventura County Fusion
26	Philadelphia Union (Note: #26: FC Dallas → Philadelphia Union. February 18, 2011: Philadelphia Union acquired this selection from FC Dallas in exchange for midfielder Andrew Jacobson.)	(United States) Don Anding	Forward	Northeastern
27	Montreal Impact	(United States) Paolo DelPiccolo	Midfielder	Louisville
28	Columbus Crew	(Canada) Drew Beckie	Defender	Denver; Ottawa Fury
29	Real Salt Lake (Note: #29: Vancouver Whitecaps FC → Philadelphia Union → Real Salt Lake. June 26, 2012: Philadelphia Union acquired this selection and the #1 position in the MLS Allocation Order from Vancouver Whitecaps FC in exchange for the #5 pick in the SuperDraft, allocation money, and the #12 position in the MLS Allocation Order. Philadelphia used the Allocation pick to select defender Bakary Soumaré. On January 17, 2013, Real Salt Lake acquired this selection from Philadelphia Union in exchange for the #31 pick in the 2013 SuperDraft and two first-round picks (#12 and #17) in the 2013 MLS Supplemental Draft.)	(United States) Devon Sandoval	Forward	New Mexico
30	Chicago Fire (Note: #30: Chicago Fire → Colorado Rapids → Chicago Fire. September 10, 2012: Colorado Rapids acquired a conditional draft pick from Chicago Fire in exchange for midfielder Wells Thompson. On October 29, 2012, the traded pick was confirmed as this second-round SuperDraft selection. On January 16, 2013, Chicago Fire re-acquired this selection and acquired midfielder Jeff Larentowicz from Colorado Rapids in exchange the #11 pick in the SuperDraft, allocation money, and a 2013 international roster slot.)	(Cameroon) Yazid Atouba	Midfielder	Rainbow FC Bamenda
31	Philadelphia Union (Note: #31: Real Salt Lake → Philadelphia Union. January 17, 2013: Philadelphia Union acquired this selection and two first-round picks (#12 and #17) in the 2013 MLS Supplemental Draft from Real Salt Lake in exchange for the #29 pick in the 2013 SuperDraft.)	(Ghana) Stephen Okai	Midfielder	Mobile; Reading United
32	Montreal Impact (Note: #32: New York Red Bulls → Sporting Kansas City → Montreal Impact. August 12, 2011: Sporting Kansas City acquired this selection from New York Red Bulls in exchange for midfielder Stéphane Auvray. On December 5, 2012 Montreal Impact acquired this selection from Sporting Kansas City in exchange for defender Josh Gardner.)	(United States) Brad Stuver	Goalkeeper	Cleveland State; Akron Summit Assault
33	San Jose Earthquakes (Note: #33: Sporting Kansas City → San Jose Earthquakes. December 12, 2012: San Jose Earthquakes acquired this selection from Sporting Kansas City in exchange for defender Ike Opara.)	(Mexico) Dan Delgado	Midfielder	San Diego; Orange County Blue Star
34	Portland Timbers (Note: #34: San Jose Earthquakes → Portland Timbers. January 17, 2013: Portland Timbers acquired this selection from San Jose Earthquakes in exchange for forward Mike Fucito.)	(United States) Dylan Tucker-Gangnes	Defender	Washington; Portland Timbers U23s
35	Seattle Sounders FC	(United States) Dylan Remick	Defender	Brown; Worcester Hydra
36	New England Revolution (Note: #36: D.C. United → New England Revolution. February 18, 2011: New England Revolution acquired this selection from D.C. United in exchange for midfielder Fred.)	(United States) Luis Soffner	Goalkeeper	Indiana
37	Houston Dynamo	(United States) Jimmy Nealis	Defender	Georgetown; Long Island Rough Riders
38	Los Angeles Galaxy	(United States) Greg Cochrane	Defender	Louisville; Reading United

== Other SuperDraft trade notes ==
- Portland Timbers acquired forward Mike Fucito from Montreal Impact in a trade on April 20, 2012. In return, Montreal was to receive either Portland's highest 2013 second-round SuperDraft pick or a 2013 international roster slot depending on Fucito's performance. Montreal received the international roster slot, not the draft pick.
- On December 12, 2012, Chivas USA acquired the #3 position in the MLS Allocation Order and either a second-round selection in the 2013 SuperDraft or a 2013 international roster slot from Portland Timbers in exchange for the #2 position in the MLS Allocation Order. Chivas USA elected to receive the international roster slot, not the draft pick.

== Notable undrafted players ==
=== Homegrown players ===
Original MLS team	Player	Position	College	Conference	Notes
Columbus Crew	Wil Trapp	Midfielder	Akron	MAC	2016 MLS All-Star; 20 USMNT caps
LA Galaxy	Gyasi Zardes	Forward	CSU Bakersfield	WAC	2015 MLS All-Star; 68 USMNT caps and 14 goals
New England Revolution	Scott Caldwell	Midfielder	Akron	MAC	2015 Team MVP
Seattle Sounders FC	DeAndre Yedlin	Defender	Akron	MAC	2013 and 2014 MLS All-Star; 78 USMNT caps
