= Panther Creek High School (North Carolina) =

Public school in Cary, North Carolina, US

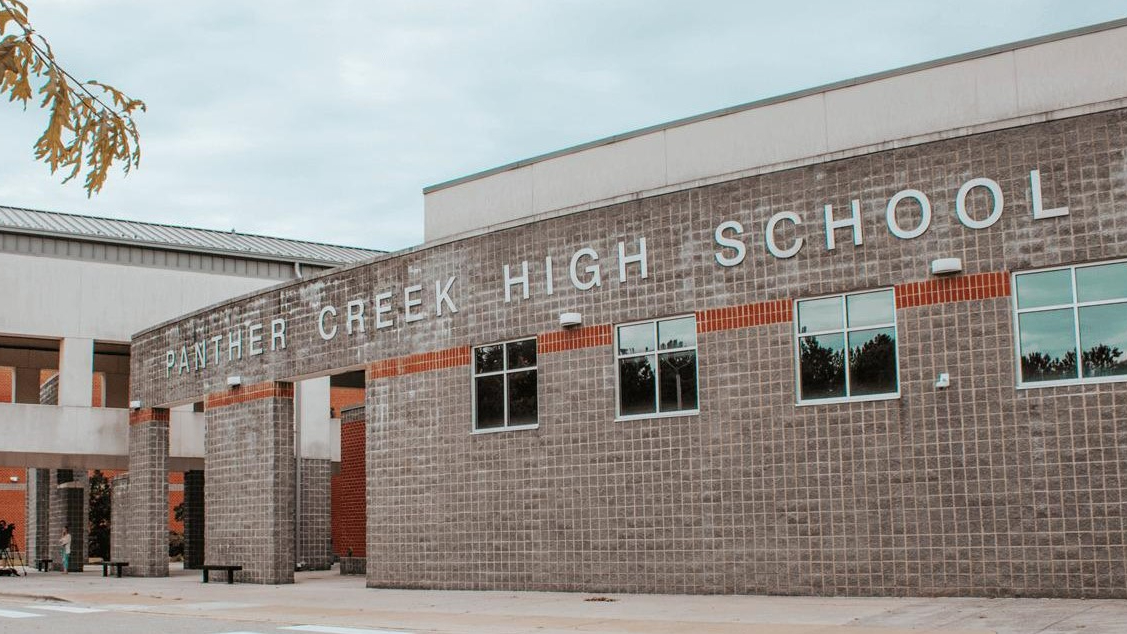
- Panther Creek High School, August 2025

Location
- 6770 McCrimmon Parkway; Cary, North Carolina 27519; United States; 35.8305°N 78.889°W

Information
- Type: Public
- Established: 2006 (20 years ago)
- School district: Wake County Public School System
- NCES District ID: 3704720
- CEEB code: 340603
- NCES School ID: 370472002810
- Principal: Stephanie Raiford
- Teaching staff: 118.24 (FTE)
- Grades: 9–12
- Enrollment: 2,561 (2023–2024)
- Student to teacher ratio: 21.66
- Colors: Columbia blue, black, and silver
- Athletics: NCHSAA 8A
- Athletics conference: Quad City Seven 8A
- Mascot: Catamount
- Rival: Green Hope High School
- Yearbook: The Prowler
- Website: Panther Creek High School

Panther Creek High School is a public high school located at 6770 McCrimmon Parkway in Cary, North Carolina, United States. As part of the Wake County Public School System, the school operates on a 4x4 block schedule like other public high schools in the region.

== History ==
Panther Creek High School was established in 2006. Rodney Nelson was the school's first principal, serving until his retirement in 2014. He was replaced by Camille Hedrick who was named North Carolina PTA Principal of the Year in 2017.

The school's main building is a three-story design that includes 274,658 square feet. There are also five modular classroom buildings. The campus consists of 93 acres. The school's main building has that same design and walls as Knightdale High School.

== Student population ==
As of the 2021-2022 school year, Panther Creek had an enrollment of 2,470 students. Of those students, 51% were female and 49% were male. In addition, 35.9% of the students are White, 35.5% Asian, 14.9% Black, 7.3% Hispanic, 4.1% two or more races, 0.2% American Indian, and 0.1% Native Hawaiian/Pacific Islander. The total minority enrollment is 64.1%.

In the 2024-2025 school year, Panther Creek had an enrollment of 2,435.

10% of the student body is economically disadvantaged, with 7% eligible for the free lunch program and 3% eligible for the reduced-price lunch program.

The graduation rate is 98%.

== Faculty ==
As of the 2021-2022 school year, there are 120.34 full-time equivalent teachers. The student to teacher ratio is 20.53:1. 97% of the teachers have three or more years of experience and are certified., In addition, the faculty includes one counselor for every 283 students or a ratio of 283:1.

The current principal is Stephanie Raiford.

== Academics ==
=== Curriculum ===
Panther Creek High School includes grades 9 through 12. The school offers Advance Placement® courses with the student participation rate being 81%. Of that number 65% pass at least one AP® exam. Students can also take virtual courses not available at Panther Creek or chose dual enrollment at local colleges and universities.

80% of the students take the SAT, with an average score of 1,246. However 78% of the school's graduates pursue either college or vocational training.

=== Rankings ===
U.S. News & World Report ranks Panther Creek #2 in Wake County, #18 in North Carolina, and #614 nationally. Niche gives the school an A+ score and a rank of #5 amongst public schools in North Carolina.

== Student life ==
=== Athletics ===
Panther Creek High School is a member of the North Carolina High School Athletic Association (NCHSAA) and are classified as a 8A school. The school is a part of the Quad City Seven 8A Conference.

The school has the following co-ed sports teams: varsity cheerleading, junior varsity cheerleading, cross country, indoor track, swimming, and track. Sport teams for women include varsity basketball, junior varsity basketball, golf, gymnastics, varsity lacrosse, junior varsity lacrosse, varsity soccer, junior varsity soccer, varsity softball, junior varsity softball, stunt, varsity tennis, varsity volleyball, and junior varsity volleyball. Men's sport teams include varsity baseball, junior varsity baseball, varsity basketball, junior varsity basketball, varsity football, junior varsity football, golf, varsity lacrosse, junior varsity lacrosse, varsity soccer, junior varsity soccer, varsity tennis, and wrestling.

=== Clubs and organizations ===
Panther Creek has a marching band, a concert band, and two indoor ensembles. The school also has numerous choral groups, including a Chamber Choir, a Mixed Chorus, and a Treble Choir.

=== Mascot and colors ===
The school's mascot is the Catamount. The school's colors are Columbia blue, black, and silver.

=== Publications ===
The student yearbook is The Prowler.

== Notable alumni ==
- Isaiah Johnson, former NFL defensive back
- Gabe Latigue, professional soccer player
- Josh Maciejewski, MLB pitcher
- Emily Moxley, professional soccer player
- Earnest Ross, professional basketball player
- Ryan Spaulding, professional soccer player
- Carson Vinson, NFL offensive tackle
