= Andrew Farrell (soccer) =

American soccer player (born 1992)

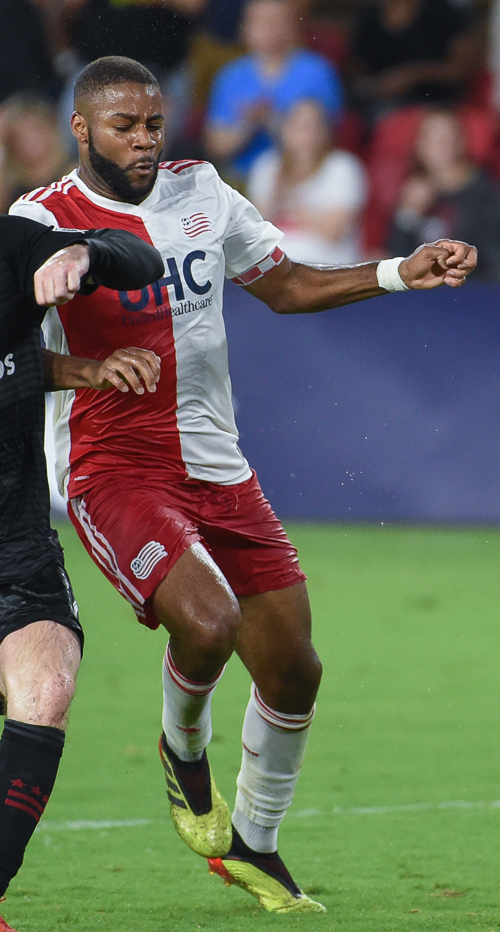
- Farrell with New England Revolution in 2018

Personal information
- Full name: Andrew Mikobi Farrell
- Date of birth: April 2, 1992 (age 34)
- Place of birth: Louisville, Kentucky, U.S.
- Height: 5 ft 11 in (1.80 m)
- Position: Defender

Team information
- Current team: New England Revolution
- Number: 88

Youth career
- 2003–2007: Esther Grande
- 2007–2010: United 1996

College career
Years	Team	Apps	(Gls)
2010–2012	Louisville Cardinals	64	(6)

Senior career*
Years	Team	Apps	(Gls)
2012	Bradenton Academics	4	(0)
2012	River City Rovers	5	(0)
2013–	New England Revolution	344	(2)
- * Club domestic league appearances and goals as of July 27, 2025

Andrew Mikobi Farrell (born April 2, 1992) is an American professional soccer player who plays as a defender for Major League Soccer club New England Revolution.

Born in Louisville, Kentucky, Farrell moved with his family to Peru at the age of five and played in the Esther Grande youth team. He moved back to the United States in 2007 and played for United 1996 before playing college soccer for the Louisville Cardinals.

After playing three seasons with the Cardinals, Farrell signed a Generation Adidas contract with Major League Soccer and was selected with the first overall pick in the 2013 MLS SuperDraft by the New England Revolution. He currently holds the record for most appearances in Revolution club history.

== Early life ==
Farrell was born in Louisville, Kentucky, but was raised in Peru from ages of five to 15, where his adoptive parents were Presbyterian missionaries. He played there for the Esther Grande Academy and attended Colegio Franklin Delano Roosevelt, The American School of Lima. He later moved back to Louisville and finished high school at Atherton High School.

== Career ==
=== College and amateur ===
Farrell moved to Louisville from Peru before his sophomore year in high school. That year, he began playing for United 1996 as well as Atherton High School. Farrell was voted best newcomer his sophomore season and was named team MVP his junior and senior year. His senior season also seen him garner all-district and all-state honors, finishing with 12 goals and seven assists. Near the end of high school, Farrell accepted a soccer scholarship to the University of Louisville.

As a freshman at Louisville, Farrell started five games and appeared in 20 for the Cardinals being only one of two freshmen to break into the starting lineup. As a junior, he started in all 23 games for the Cardinals as a midfielder before moving back as a defender for the final nine games of the season. He was named to the NCAA Division I First-Team All-America and won the Big East Defensive Player of the Year Award after the Cardinals only allowed an average of 0.62 goals per game.

Farrell also spent the 2012 season in the USL Premier Development League with the Bradenton Academics and the River City Rovers.

=== Professional ===
On January 3, 2013, Farrell signed a Generation Adidas contract with the MLS, making him eligible for early entry into the 2013 MLS SuperDraft. Two weeks later, he was drafted first overall in the MLS SuperDraft by the New England Revolution, making him the first ever no. 1 pick in club history.

On March 9, 2013, Farrell made his professional debut in the Revs 1–0 away victory over the Chicago Fire in the club's first game of the 2013 season. He made 32 appearances for the Revolution during his rookie season, and recorded his first assist in a Revolution jersey on June 2, 2013, setting up Kelyn Rowe's 94th-minute goal in the Revolution's 5–0 win over the LA Galaxy. MLS listed Farrell at no. 9 on its annual "24 under 24" list of best young players.

During the 2014 season Farrell appeared in 32 games helping the Revolution make their fifth MLS Cup appearance and Eastern Conference championship.

Farrell became a fixture on the Revolution over the coming seasons, leading the club in matches started in 2017, 2021, and 2022. He additionally led the team in minutes played in 2017 and 2021.

Farrell was named Revolution team Defender of the Year a club-record five occasions (2015, 2018, 2019, 2021, and 2022). In doing so, he became the first Revolution player to win the honor in back-to-back seasons since Michael Parkhurst in 2007 and 2008, and the only Revolution player to ever win the honor in back-to-back seasons on two occasions.

In 2016, Farrell was named an MLS All-Star. That same year Farrell and the Revolution reached the US Open Cup Final, where they lost 4–2 to FC Dallas. He was also named Revolution team Humanitarian of the Year in 2018, 2023, and 2024.

Farrell's scored his first professional goal on April 6, 2018, in the Revolution's 4–0 win over the Montreal Impact. That game also marked Farrell's 163rd career start, which tied him with Taylor Twellman for 7th-most in club history. He would score his second career goal later that year and recorded two assists.

On June 24, 2020, it was announced Farrell had signed a multi-year contract extension with the Revolution.

On August 8, 2021, Farrell set a new club record making his 255th career start in a 2–1 win over the Philadelphia Union, passing the previous all-time starts mark set by Shalrie Joseph. Farrell also holds the club record for minutes played, which was achieved on August 18, 2021, in a 3–2 win over D.C. United. That year he appeared in 33 games helping the Revolution capture the Supporters Shield for the first time.

On September 30, 2023, Farrell made his 350th career start for the Revolution across all competitions, the most of any player in Revolution history. Following the conclusion of the 2024 season, The Revolution re-signed Farrell to a one-year contract that would also see him act in a Player Professional Development role as an assistant coach in the Revolution Academy in addition to his playing duties.

On April 29, 2026, Farrell scored his first goal in nearly eight years during the Revolution's US Open Cup 4–3 loss to Orlando City SC.

On October 26 of the same year, Farrell announced he would be retiring from professional soccer at the end of the 2026 season.

== Personal life ==
Since he joined the New England Revolution in 2013, Farrell has been involved in various community-related initiatives. In 2017, Farrell was paired with a 10-year-old pediatric cancer patient named Abby Waldron which evolved into a long-lasting friendship. This experience led to Farrell starting "Andrew's NEGU Crew" in 2023, a New England Revolution program hosted by Farrell in partnership with the Jessie Rees Foundation which honors local pediatric cancer patients during Revolution home matches at Gillette Stadium, where they meet Farrell and sit in VIP rooms. Farrell has been involved with Special Olympics Massachusetts along with their Unified soccer program since its inception and is one of their ambassadors. He has also regularly volunteered at soccer camps and made hospital visits to greet sick children.

In April 2020, Farrell hosted two Fortnite tournaments featuring fellow Major League Soccer players, which raised $3,000 for COVID-19 relief funds.

Outside of soccer Farrell enjoys playing the piano.

In 2018, Farrell, alongside New England Revolution teammate Matt Turner, reenacted multiple scenes from the film ELF in an online series posted by the Revolution.

== Career statistics ==
=== Club ===
As of November 17, 2021

Appearances and goals by club, season and competition
Club	Season	League			National cup		Other		Total	
Club	Season	Division	Apps	Goals	Apps	Goals	Apps	Goals	Apps	Goals
Bradenton Academics	2012	PDL	4	0	—		—		4	0
River City Rovers	2012	PDL	5	0	—		—		5	0
New England Revolution	2013	MLS	32	0	1	0	2 (Note: Appearance(s) in MLS Cup Playoffs)	0	35	0
New England Revolution	2014	MLS	32	0	1	0	4	0	37	0
New England Revolution	2015	MLS	32	0	0	0	1	0	33	0
New England Revolution	2016	MLS	33	0	4	0	—		37	0
New England Revolution	2017	MLS	30	0	3	0	—		33	0
New England Revolution	2018	MLS	31	2	1	0	—		32	2
New England Revolution	2019	MLS	29	0	2	0	1	0	32	0
New England Revolution	2020	MLS	20	0	—		4	0	24	0
New England Revolution	2021	MLS	33	0	0	0	0	0	33	0
New England Revolution	Total		272	2	12	0	12	0	296	2
Career total			281	2	12	0	12	0	305	2

== Honors ==
New England Revolution

- Supporters' Shield: 2021

Louisville Cardinals

- Big East Red Division Champions: 2010, 2012
- Big East Tournament Champions: 2010

Individual

- NCAA First-Team All-American: 2012
- Big East Defensive Player of the Year: 2012
- MLS All-Star: 2016
- New England Revolution Defender of the Year: 2015, 2018, 2019, 2021 and 2022
- New England Revolution Humanitarian of the Year: 2018, 2023, 2024 and 2025
- New England Revolution Players' Player of the Year: 2025
- New England Revolution All-Time Team: 2020
