= Kalifa Cissé =

Malian-French footballer (born 1984)

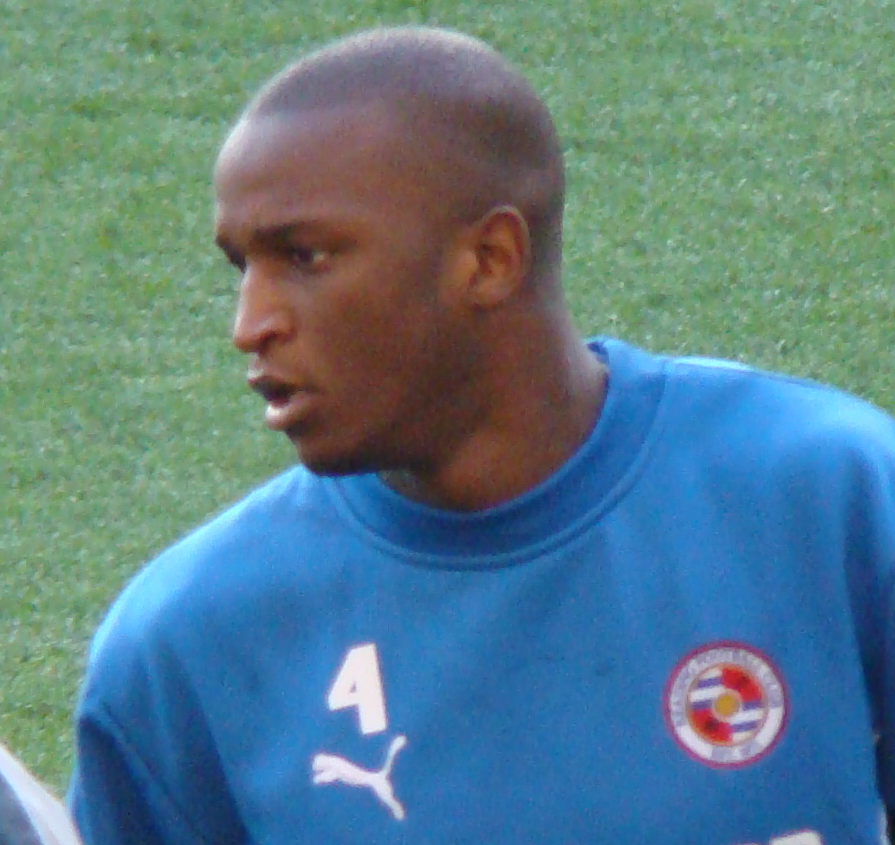
- Cissé with Reading in 2008

Personal information
- Date of birth: 1 September 1984 (age 42)
- Place of birth: Dreux, France
- Height: 1.88 m (6 ft 2 in)
- Positions: Defensive midfielder; centre-back

Team information
- Current team: Paris FC (assistant coach)

Youth career
- Drouais
- 2003–2004: Toulouse

Senior career*
Years	Team	Apps	(Gls)
2004–2005	Estoril	6	(0)
2005–2007	Boavista	42	(0)
2007–2010	Reading	90	(7)
2010–2012	Bristol City	61	(2)
2013	New England Revolution	6	(0)
2013–2014	Derby County	3	(0)
2014–2016	Bangkok United	71	(3)
2016	Bangkok Glass	15	(1)
2017	BEC Tero Sasana	29	(2)
2018–2019	Central Coast Mariners	8	(0)
Total		331	(15)

International career
2003	Mali U20		
2008–2012	Mali	5	(0)

Managerial career
- 2023: Bristol City (interim assistant)
- 2026–: Paris FC (assistant)
- * Club domestic league appearances and goals

Kalifa Cissé (born 1 September 1984) is a former professional footballer who played as a defensive midfielder or centre-back. He is currently assistant coach of Ligue 1 club Paris FC. Born in France, he played for the Mali national team.

== Club career ==
=== Early career ===
Born in Dreux, France, Cissé started his career as a trainee at French club Toulouse, and moved on to Portuguese Primeira Liga side Estoril. He made only six league appearances and the club was relegated at the end of the season but he caught the attention of Boavista, for whom he signed in 2005.

=== Reading ===
Cissé's performances in the top division of Portuguese football alerted Reading to his potential and on 16 May 2007, he sealed a move on a three-year contract, for a fee of just under €1 million.

He made his Premier League debut for Reading against Chelsea on 15 August and was sent off in the 72nd minute for a second bookable offence. He scored his first Reading goal on 29 December 2007 in a 6–4 defeat to Tottenham Hotspur.

In his second season at Reading, Cissé became a fan favourite. In the Championship, he scored a crucial goal against eventual champions Wolves as well as a goal that was voted the club's best of the season against Bristol City.

He was used more sparingly in his third season at the club, making only nineteen league and cup appearances. He scored once, in a 2–0 win at Sheffield Wednesday on 5 December 2009.

=== Bristol City ===
In July 2010, Cissé joined Bristol City on a two-year deal for an undisclosed fee. The move brought him into contact once again with City manager Steve Coppell, who signed Cissé for Reading.

=== New England Revolution ===
Cissé signed with the New England Revolution of Major League Soccer in the United States ahead of the 2013 MLS season. Revolution General Manager Mike Burns praised Cissé's arrival, stating "We believe he has the ability to make a significant impact on our club, both on and off the field, in 2013." He made his Revolution debut in the 2013 season-opener on 9 March 2013, playing the full match in the Revolution's 1-0 win over Chicago Fire. He made his final Revolution appearance on 11 May, playing a total of 456 for the club. On 6 August 2013, wanting to return to England, Cissé mutually terminated his contract with New England Revolution.

=== Derby County ===
Cissé went on trial with Birmingham City in August 2013. After refusing a contract from the club, he went on trial at Championship side Derby County in October 2013. He played the full 90 minutes of a 2–1 under-21s match defeat against Huddersfield Town on 4 November and 5 days later, he signed for the club on a non-contract basis. The same day, he made his league debut for the club against Sheffield Wednesday. He played instead of the suspended John Eustace, having received international clearance the previous evening. The Rams ran out 3–0 winners and head coach Steve McClaren praised his performance. On 18 November, he signed a two-month contract as a reward for his performance. First-team coach Paul Simpson said that the short-term contract was an incentive for Cissé to impress Derby or any other club who might be interested, should his deal not be extended. He missed the club's next match against AFC Bournemouth on 23 November after collapsing shortly after the match against Sheffield Wednesday. He was rushed to hospital and treated for an infected toe.

=== Central Coast Mariners ===
In June 2018, Cissé joined A-League club Central Coast Mariners on a one-year contract. He made his debut on 1 August 2018 in the Round of 32 of the FFA Cup against Adelaide United where they lost 3–0. Cissé retired on 30 January 2019, taking up a coaching position with the Central Coast Mariners Academy.

== International career ==
Although born in France, Cissé played for the Mali U20 team in the 2003 FIFA World Youth Championship, his debut coming v Argentina.

He received his first call up to the Mali senior team on 20 March 2008 for the 2010 World Cup Qualifier v Sudan, which he won 3–0.

Cissé also appeared against Liberia on 9 October 2010, in an Africa Cup of Nations qualifier, as well as in friendlies against Congo (17 November 2010), Ivory Coast (8 February 2011) and Tunisia (10 August 2011).

== Personal life ==
Cissé was born in France to a family with Malian origins, and two of his younger brothers – Salif and Ibrahima – also embraced a professional footballing career.
