= Jossimar Sanchez =

American-Dominican soccer player (born 1991)

Personal information
- Full name: Jossimar Israel Sanchez
- Date of birth: September 4, 1991 (age 35)
- Place of birth: Paterson, New Jersey, United States
- Height: 1.75 m (5 ft 9 in)
- Position: Defender

Youth career
- 2009–2012: Connecticut Huskies

Senior career*
Years	Team	Apps	(Gls)
2011	Central Jersey Spartans	4	(0)
2014	New England Revolution	0	(0)
2014	→ Rochester Rhinos (loan)	8	(0)
2015	Nyköpings BIS	15	(0)
2016	Kraft	22	(0)
2017–2018	GBK	39	(0)
- * Club domestic league appearances and goals as of September 8, 2019

Jossimar Israel Sanchez (born September 4, 1991) is a Dominican American soccer player.

== Career ==
Sanchez played four years of college soccer at the University of Connecticut between 2009 and 2012. While at college, Sanchez also appeared for USL PDL side Central Jersey Spartans in 2011.

On January 22, 2013, Sanchez was selected 4th in the 2013 MLS Supplemental Draft by New England Revolution, and was signed over a year later on February 24, 2014. He was later loaned out to New England's USL Pro affiliate Rochester Rhinos. On December 8, 2014, the New England Revolution declined his contract option.
