= Steve Neumann =

American soccer player

Personal information
- Full name: Stephen Neumann
- Date of birth: October 2, 1991 (age 35)
- Place of birth: New Hope, Pennsylvania, United States
- Height: 1.83 m (6 ft 0 in)
- Position: Midfielder

Youth career
- 2010–2013: Georgetown Hoyas

Senior career*
Years	Team	Apps	(Gls)
2011–2013	Reading United	29	(7)
2014–2016	New England Revolution	36	(0)
- * Club domestic league appearances and goals as of 14:57, 26 October 2016 (UTC)

Stephen Neumann (born October 2, 1991) is an American former professional soccer player. Steve Neumann was selected 4th overall in 2014 MLS SuperDraft and played 3 seasons for the New England Revolution making 36 appearances.

== Career ==
=== College and amateur ===
Neumann played four years of college soccer at Georgetown University between 2010 and 2013. He ended his Georgetown career with 41 goals and 34 assists and was twice an NSCAA Second Team All American. While at Georgetown, Neumann also appeared for USL PDL club Reading United AC from 2011 to 2013. Neumann was named Reading United captain in 2013 and finished his career with Reading having played 29 matches and scoring 7 goals.

=== Professional ===
On January 16, 2014, Neumann was selected in the first round (4th overall) of the 2014 MLS SuperDraft by New England Revolution.

Neumann made his professional debut on April 5, 2014, in a 2–0 loss against D.C. United.

Neumann was released by New England at the end of 2016 season, and announced his retirement via Twitter on December 22, 2016.
