= Gabe Latigue =

American soccer player

Personal information
- Full name: Gabe Latigue
- Date of birth: October 11, 1990 (age 36)
- Place of birth: Jackson, Mississippi, United States
- Height: 5 ft 9 in (1.75 m)
- Position: Midfielder

Youth career
- 2009–2012: Elon Phoenix

Senior career*
Years	Team	Apps	(Gls)
2013	New England Revolution	0	(0)
2013	→ Rochester Rhinos (loan)	15	(0)
2014	Carolina RailHawks	2	(0)
- * Club domestic league appearances and goals as of November 30, 2014

Gabe Latigue (born October 11, 1990) is an American soccer player.

== Background ==
Latigue graduated from Panther Creek High School in Cary, North Carolina.

== Career ==
=== College ===
Latigue spent his entire college career at Elon University. In 2009, he made 20 appearances as a true freshman and recorded two assists, including one in a 2-0 SoCon Tournament semifinal win over College of Charleston. In 2010, he made 19 appearances and recorded six goals and two assists. In 2011, he made 22 appearances and finished with four goals and seven assists and was named to the SoCon All-Tournament Team. In his senior year in 2012, he made 21 appearances and finished with five goals and six assists.

=== Professional ===
On January 22, 2013, Latigue was drafted in the fourth round (61st overall) of the 2013 MLS Supplemental Draft by New England Revolution. After an impressive preseason, he signed a contract with the club on March 1.

On March 27, 2013, Latigue was loaned to USL Pro affiliate Rochester Rhinos for the 2013 season. He made his Rhinos debut on April 13 in a 3–0 loss to VSI Tampa Bay FC.

He was waived following the 2013 season.

In 2014, Letigue was signed by the Carolina Railhawks.
