= Luis Soffner =

American soccer player

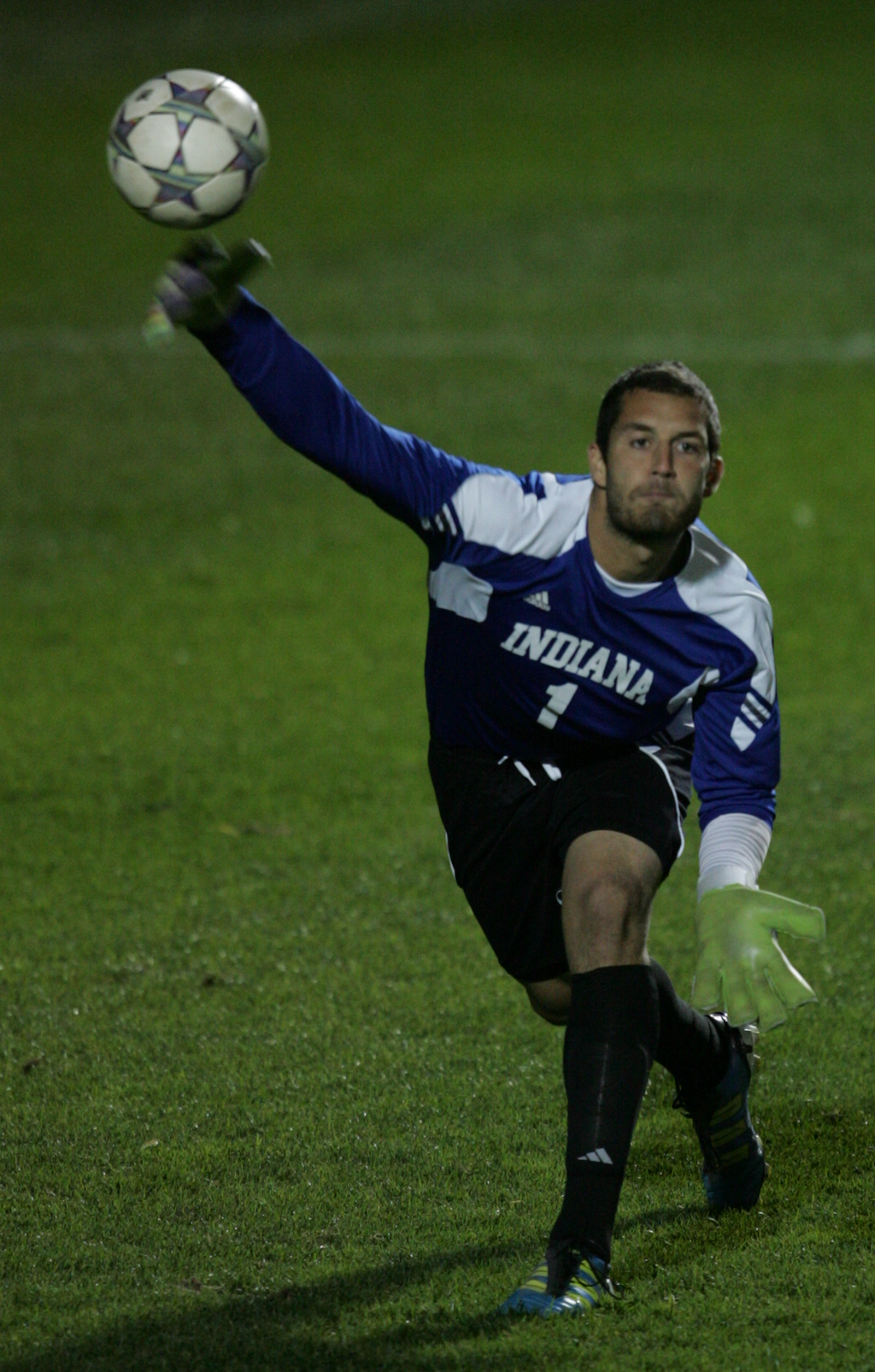
- Soffner playing for Indiana in 2011

Personal information
- Full name: Luis Soffner
- Date of birth: January 15, 1990 (age 36)
- Place of birth: St. Louis, Missouri, U.S.
- Height: 1.93 m (6 ft 4 in)
- Position: Goalkeeper

Youth career
- 2008–2012: Indiana Hoosiers

Senior career*
Years	Team	Apps	(Gls)
2013–2014	New England Revolution	0	(0)
2014	→ Rochester Rhinos (loan)	10	(0)
- * Club domestic league appearances and goals as of September 8, 2014

Luis Soffner (born January 15, 1990) is an American former soccer player.

== Career ==
On January 17, 2013, Soffner was drafted in the second round of the 2013 MLS SuperDraft (36th overall) by the New England Revolution. After not making a single appearance for the club in 2013, Soffner was loaned to USL Pro affiliate club Rochester Rhinos for the 2014 season. He made his professional debut on April 5, 2014, in a 3–1 loss to defending USL Pro champions Orlando City.

As of 2022 Soffner is the Director of Investor Relations for Beach Company Real Estate. He resides with his wife, Candice Lorraine in Charleston.
