= 2018 New England Revolution season =

New England Revolution
2018 season
- Owner: Robert Kraft; Jonathan Kraft (The Kraft Group)
- President: Brian Bilello
- Head coach: Brad Friedel
- Stadium: Gillette Stadium; Foxborough, Massachusetts
- MLS: Conference: 8th Overall: 16th
- MLS Cup Playoffs: Did not qualify
- U.S. Open Cup: Fourth round (3-2 loss vs. Louisville City)
- Top goalscorer: League: Teal Bunbury; Cristian Penilla (11); All: Teal Bunbury; Cristian Penilla (11)
- Highest home attendance: 36,573 (July 14 vs LA Galaxy
- Lowest home attendance: 10,507 (May 30 vs Atlanta United FC
- Average home league attendance: 18,347 (league)
Home colors	Away colors

The 2018 New England Revolution season was the team's 23rd season of existence, and their 23rd season in Major League Soccer, the top-flight of American soccer.

== Current squad ==
As of June 12, 2018. Source: New England Revolution Roster

No.	Name	Nationality	Position	Date of birth (age)	Previous club
Goalkeepers
1	Cody Cropper	(United States)	GK	February 16, 1993 (age 33)	(England) Milton Keynes Dons
18	Brad Knighton	(United States)	GK	February 6, 1985 (age 41)	(Canada) Vancouver Whitecaps FC
30	Matt Turner	(United States)	GK	June 24, 1994 (age 31)	(United States) Fairfield University
Defenders
2	Andrew Farrell	(United States)	DF	April 2, 1992 (age 34)	(United States) University of Louisville
3	Jalil Anibaba	(United States)	DF	October 19, 1988 (age 37)	(United States) Houston Dynamo
4	Claude Dielna	(France)	DF	December 14, 1987 (age 38)	(England) Sheffield Wednesday
8	Chris Tierney	(United States)	DF	January 9, 1986 (age 40)	(United States) University of Virginia
12	Nicolas Samayoa	(Guatemala)	DF	August 2, 1995 (age 30)	(United States) Florida Gulf Coast University
19	Antonio Delamea Mlinar	(Slovenia)	DF	June 10, 1991 (age 34)	(Slovenia) Olimpija Ljubljana
91	Gabriel Somi	(Syria)	DF	August 24, 1991 (age 34)	(Sweden) Östersunds FK
Midfielders
	Isaac Angking	(United States)	MF	January 24, 2000 (age 26)	(United States) New England Revolution Academy
6	Scott Caldwell	(United States)	MF	March 15, 1991 (age 35)	(United States) University of Akron
11	Kelyn Rowe	(United States)	MF	December 25, 1991 (age 34)	(United States) University of California, Los Angeles
14	Diego Fagúndez	(Uruguay)	MF	February 14, 1995 (age 31)	(United States) New England Revolution Academy
15	Brandon Bye	(United States)	MF	November 29, 1995 (age 30)	(United States) Western Michigan University
16	Mark Segbers	(United States)	MF	April 18, 1996 (age 30)	(United States) University of Wisconsin
17	Luis Caicedo	(Colombia)	MF	May 18, 1996 (age 30)	(Colombia) Cortuluá
21	Zachary Herivaux	(Haiti)	MF	February 1, 1996 (age 30)	(United States) Beaver Country Day School
23	Wilfried Zahibo	(France)	MF	August 21, 1993 (age 32)	(Spain) Nàstic
Forwards
7	Brian Wright	(Canada)	F	March 24, 1995 (age 31)	(United States) Burlingame Dragons
9	Krisztián Németh	(Hungary)	F	January 5, 1989 (age 37)	(Qatar) Al-Gharafa
10	Teal Bunbury	(United States)	F	February 27, 1990 (age 36)	(United States) Sporting Kansas City
17	Juan Agudelo	(United States)	F	November 23, 1992 (age 33)	(Netherlands) FC Utrecht
70	Cristian Penilla	(Ecuador)	FW	May 2, 1991 (age 35)	(Mexico) C.F. Pachuca
88	Femi Hollinger-Janzen	(Benin)	F	December 14, 1993 (age 32)	(United States) Indiana University

=== Staff ===
Title	Name
President	Brian Bilello
General manager	Mike Burns
Head coach	Brad Friedel
Assistant coach	Mike Lapper
Assistant coach	Marcelo Nevelef
Goalkeepers coach	Ruben Garcia
Director of scouting and player personnel	Remi Roy
Director of soccer operations	Jason Gove
Soccer operations coordinator	Tyler Fletcher
Soccer operations coordinator	Kevin Santos
Equipment manager	Scott Emmens
Analyst	Tim Crawford
Team video coordinator	Todd Kingston
Head of fitness	Anton McElhone
Head athletic trainer	Evan Allen
Assistant athletic trainer	Phil Madore

Last updated: February 10, 2018
Source: New England Revolution

== Matches and results ==
=== Preseason ===
January 31, 2018	New England Revolution	4–3	New York Red Bulls	Bradenton, Florida
20:32 EST	Wright 32' (Caldwell); Penilla 39'; Rowe 61' (PK); Hollinger-Janzen 70' (Rowe, Wright)	Report	Muyl 11'; Wright-Phillips 13'; Rivas 76'	Stadium: IMG Academy

February 3, 2018	New England Revolution	0–1	Malmö FF	Bradenton, Florida
14:30 EST		Report	Strandberg 57'	Stadium: IMG Academy

February 6, 2018	New England Revolution	1–1	FC Cincinnati	Bradenton, Florida
15:30 EST	Bye 49' (Penilla)	Report	Bone 37'	Stadium: IMG Academy

February 14, 2018 Mobile Mini Sun Cup	New England Revolution	2–2	FC Dallas	Tucson, Arizona
13:00 EST	Zahibo (red card) 8'; Penilla 55'; Fagúndez 85'	Report	Díaz 15'; Urruti 77'	Stadium: Kino Veterans Memorial Stadium

February 17, 2018 Mobile Mini Sun Cup	New England Revolution	3–3	San Antonio FC	Tucson, Arizona
18:00 EST	Bunbury 22' (Penilla), 41' (Bye); Delamea 44' (Fagúndez); Zahibo (yellow card) 49'; Rowe (yellow card) 63'	Report	Guadarrama 12' (PK), (yellow card) 39'; Lopez (yellow card) 49'; Guzmán 59' (Guadarrama), 61' (Guadarrama)	Stadium: Kino Veterans Memorial Stadium

February 21, 2018 Mobile Mini Sun Cup	New England Revolution	2–1	Sporting Kansas City	Tucson, Arizona
13:00 EST	Dick 13' (o.g.); Cropper (yellow card) 20'; Rowe 36', (yellow card) 43'; Caldwell (yellow card) 83'	Report	Rubio 21' (pen.); Kauzin (yellow card) 57'	Stadium: Kino Veterans Memorial Stadium

February 24, 2018 Mobile Mini Sun Cup	New England Revolution	1–1 (4–3 p)	Houston Dynamo	Tucson, Arizona
	Farrell (yellow card) 40'; Németh 48'; Delamea (yellow card) 58'	Report	García (yellow card) 43'; Elis (yellow card) 45+2', (goal) 63' (pen.); Leonardo (yellow card) 85'	Stadium: Kino Veterans Memorial Stadium
	Penalties
	Rowe (penalty missed); Caldwell (penalty scored); Bunbury (penalty scored); Tierney (penalty scored); Németh (penalty scored)		(penalty scored) Rodríguez; (penalty scored) Cerén; (penalty scored) Martínez; (penalty missed) Álvarez; (penalty missed) Elis

=== MLS regular season ===
==== Eastern Conference table ====
Pos	Team	Pld	W	L	T	GF	GA	GD	Pts	Qualification
6	Philadelphia Union	34	15	14	5	49	50	−1	50	MLS Cup Knockout Round
7	Montreal Impact	34	14	16	4	47	53	−6	46	
8	New England Revolution	34	10	13	11	49	55	−6	41	
9	Toronto FC	34	10	18	6	59	64	−5	36	
10	Chicago Fire	34	8	18	8	48	61	−13	32	

Source: MLS

==== Overall standings ====
Pos	Team	Pld	W	L	T	GF	GA	GD	Pts	Qualification
14	Vancouver Whitecaps FC	34	13	13	8	54	67	−13	47	
15	Montreal Impact	34	14	16	4	47	53	−6	46	
16	New England Revolution	34	10	13	11	49	55	−6	41	
17	Houston Dynamo	34	10	16	8	58	58	0	38	CONCACAF Champions League
18	Minnesota United FC	34	11	20	3	49	71	−22	36	

Source: MLS
Rules for classification: 1) points; 2) total wins; 3) total goal differential; 4) total goals scored; 5) disciplinary points; 6) away goals scored; 7) away goal differential; 8) coin toss or drawing of lots

==== Matches ====
March 3, 2018 1	Philadelphia Union	2–0	New England Revolution	Chester, Pennsylvania
17:00 EST (UTC−05:00)	Fontana 43' (Sapong, Bedoya); Sapong (yellow card) 63' (goal) 69' (Burke)	Report	Delamea (red card) 24'; Dielna (yellow card) 36' (yellow-red card) 86'; Farrell (yellow card) 59'; Zahibo (yellow card) 90+1'	Stadium: Talen Energy Stadium; Attendance: 16,452; Referee: Rubiel Vazquez

March 10, 2018 2	New England Revolution	2–1	Colorado Rapids	Foxborough, Massachusetts
13:30 EST (UTC−05:00)	Bye (yellow card) 24'; Fagúndez 48' (Penilla); Rowe (yellow card) 63'; Bunbury (yellow card) 86'; Tierney 90+3' (F.K.)	Report	Mcbean (yellow card) 17'; Jackson 66' (Blomberg); Martínez (yellow card) 74'	Stadium: Gillette Stadium; Attendance: 13,305; Referee: Armando Vilarreal

March 24, 2018 3	New England Revolution	2–2	New York City FC	Foxborough, Massachusetts
13:30 EDT (UTC−04:00)	Fagúndez 11' (Zahibo); Caldwell (yellow card) 43'; Agudelo 63' (Penilla); Dielna (yellow card) 70'	Report	Tajouri-Shradi (yellow card) 34' (goal) 51' (Abdul-Salaam), 75' (Herrera); Abdul-Salaam (yellow card) 90'	Stadium: Gillette Stadium; Attendance: 12,376; Referee: Jair Marrufo

March 31, 2018 4	Houston Dynamo	0–2	New England Revolution	Houston, Texas
20:30 EDT (UTC−04:00)	Beasley (red card) 35'; Machado (yellow card) 69'; Fuenmayor (yellow card) 86'	Report	Bunbury 15' (Penilla, Caicedo); Somi (yellow card) 52'; Fagúndez (yellow card) 64'; Penilla 71' (Somi)	Stadium: BBVA Compass Stadium; Attendance: 17,156; Referee: Sorin Stoica

April 6, 2018 5	New England Revolution	4–0	Montreal Impact	Foxborough, Massachusetts
19:30 EDT (UTC−04:00)	Bunbury 20' (Zahibo); Farrell 45' (Fagúndez); Fagúndez 71' (Rowe); Zahibo 80' (Rowe); Caicedo (yellow card) 85'	Report	Taïder (red card) 14'; Raitala (yellow card) 89'	Stadium: Gillette Stadium; Attendance: 10,908; Referee: Jose Carlos Rivero

April 14, 2018 6	New England Revolution	0–1	FC Dallas	Foxborough, Massachusetts
19:30 EDT (UTC−04:00)		Report	Hayes 76'	Stadium: Gillette Stadium; Attendance: 11,508; Referee: Hilario Grajeda

April 21, 2018 7	Columbus Crew	2–2	New England Revolution	Columbus, Ohio
19:30 EDT (UTC−04:00)	Farrell 9' (O.G.); Zardes 43' (Higuaín, Santos); Higuaín (yellow card) 66'	Report	Dielna (yellow card) 11'; Bunbury 14' (Penilla, Zahibo); Zahibo (yellow card) 36'; Penilla 45+1' (Agudelo); Fagúndez (yellow card) 60'; Somi (yellow card) 67'; Turner (yellow card) 88'	Stadium: Mapfre Stadium; Attendance: 11,264; Referee: Chris Penso

April 28, 2018 8	New England Revolution	1–0	Sporting Kansas City	Foxborough, Massachusetts
19:30 EDT (UTC−04:00)	Bunbury 44'; Fagúndez (yellow card) 45+3'; Somi (yellow card) 77'	Report	Shelton (yellow card) 76'	Stadium: Gillette Stadium; Attendance: 17,015; Referee: David Gantar

May 5, 2018 9	Montreal Impact	4–2	New England Revolution	Montreal, Quebec, Canada
13:00 EDT (UTC−04:00)	Duvall (yellow card) 38'; Jackson-Hamel 45+2' 52'; Edwards 62'; Piatti 68'	Report	Caicedo (yellow card) 59'; Zahibo 78' 86'; Fagúndez (yellow card) 90+1'	Stadium: Stade Saputo; Attendance: 15,622; Referee: Baldomero Toledo

May 12, 2018 10	New England Revolution	3–2	Toronto FC	Foxborough, Massachusetts
19:30 EDT (UTC−04:00)	Penilla 4', 7'; Tierney (yellow card) 23'; Caldwell (yellow card) 40'; Bunbury 46'; Caicedo (yellow card) 68'; Fagúndez (yellow card) 73'	Report	Delamea 55' (o.g.); Giovinco 89' (pen.), (red card) 90'	Stadium: Gillette Stadium; Attendance: 19,596; Referee: Mark Geiger

May 19, 2018 11	New England Revolution	0–1	Columbus Crew	Foxborough, Massachusetts
19:30 EDT (UTC−04:00)	Luis Caicedo (yellow card) 13'; Delamea (yellow card) 31'; Dielna (yellow card) 67'; Anibaba (yellow card) 89'	Report	Valenzuela (yellow card) 44'; Abubakar 85' (Higuaín)	Stadium: Gillette Stadium; Attendance: 14,087; Referee: Sorin Stoica

May 26, 2018 12	Vancouver Whitecaps FC	3–3	New England Revolution	Vancouver, British Columbia, Canada
17:30 EDT (UTC−04:00)	Reyna (yellow card) 17'; Ghazal 26' (O.G.); Kamara (yellow card) 30'; Techera 49' (de Jong, Davies), 51', 74' (Reyna, Felipe)	Report	Bunbury (yellow card) 11' (goal) 59' (Fagúndez, Bye); Penilla 48'	Stadium: BC Place; Attendance: 22,120; Referee: Joseph Dickerson

May 30, 2018 13	New England Revolution	1–1	Atlanta United FC	Foxborough, Massachusetts
19:30 EDT (UTC−04:00)	Zahibo (yellow card) 54'; Anibaba (yellow card) 73'; Németh (yellow card) 81'; Bunbury 88' (pen.)	Report	Martínez 23' (Gressel, Nagbe); Gressel (yellow card) 36'; Guzan (yellow card) 88'; Williams (yellow card) 89'	Stadium: Gillette Stadium; Attendance: 10,547; Referee: Silviu Petrescu

June 2, 2018 14	New England Revolution	2–1	New York Red Bulls	Foxborough, Massachusetts
19:30 EDT (UTC−04:00)	Delamea (yellow card) 31'; Fagúndez 45+1' (Németh, Bunbury); Bunbury 78' (Penilla); Rowe (yellow card) 81'		Wright-Phillips 8' (Davis) (yellow card) 69'; Bezecourt (yellow card) 30'	Stadium: Gillette Stadium; Attendance: 21,576; Referee: José Carlos Rivero

June 9, 2018 15	Chicago Fire	1–1	New England Revolution	Bridgeview, Illinois
20:30 EDT (UTC−04:00)	Schweinsteiger 63' (Katai)	Report	Dielna (yellow card) 31'; Bunbury 82' (Fagundez) (yellow card) 83'	Stadium: Toyota Park; Attendance: 14,415; Referee: Kevin Stott

June 13, 2018 16	San Jose Earthquakes	2–2	New England Revolution	San Jose, California
22:30 EDT (UTC−04:00)	Hoesen 17' (Jungwirth) 51' (Lima)	Report	Fagundez 31'; Penilla 43' (Fagundez)	Stadium: Avaya Stadium; Attendance: 16234; Referee: David Gantar

June 30, 2018 17	New England Revolution	3–2	D.C. United	Foxborough, Massachusetts
19:30 EDT (UTC−04:00)	Penilla 18' (Németh) 78' (pen.); Delamea (yellow card) 27'; Caicedo (yellow card) 41'; Bunbury 45+1' (Anibaba)	Report	Asad 42' (Stieber) 73' (pen.); Mattocks (yellow card) 77'; Fisher (yellow card) 78'	Stadium: Gillette Stadium; Attendance: 19,371; Referee: Allen Chapman

July 7, 2018 18	New England Revolution	0–0	Seattle Sounders FC	Foxborough, Massachusetts
19:30 EDT (UTC−04:00)	Fagundez (yellow card) 41'; Rowe (yellow card) 81'	Preview	Lodeiro (yellow card) 42'; Delem (yellow card) 90+3'; Nouhou (yellow card) 90+4'	Stadium: Gillette Stadium; Attendance: 16,484; Referee: Nima Saghafi

July 14, 2018 19	New England Revolution	2–3	LA Galaxy	Foxborough, Massachusetts
19:30 EDT (UTC−04:00)				Stadium: Gillette Stadium; Attendance: 36,573

July 18, 2018 20	Minnesota United FC	2–1	New England Revolution	Minneapolis, Minnesota
20:00 EDT (UTC−04:00)				Stadium: TCF Bank Stadium

July 21, 2018 21	New York Red Bulls	2–0	New England Revolution	Harrison, New Jersey
19:00 EDT (UTC−04:00)	Royer 69'; Wright-Phillips 80'	Report		Stadium: Red Bull Arena; Attendance: 16,027

August 4, 2018 22	Orlando City SC	3–3	New England Revolution	Orlando, Florida
19:30 EDT (UTC−04:00)	PC (yellow card) 6'; Kljestan (yellow card) 39'; Dwyer 45', (yellow card) 90+4'; Tarek 71'; Sutter 90+3'; Yotún (red card) 90+8'	Report	Agudelo 7'; Penilla 18'; Bye (yellow card) 38'; Bunbury 76'	Stadium: Orlando City Stadium; Attendance: 23,879; Referee: Hilario Grajeda

August 11, 2018 23	New England Revolution	2–3	Philadelphia Union	Foxborough, Massachusetts
19:30 EDT (UTC−04:00)	Farrell 46'; Zahibo 64'; Delamea (yellow card) 75'; Rowe (yellow card) 90+3'	Report	Elliott 14', 24'; Blake (yellow card) 57'; Picault (yellow card) 63', (goal) 76' (pen.)	Stadium: Gillette Stadium; Attendance: 19,516; Referee: Allen Chapman

August 19, 2018 24	D.C. United	2–0	New England Revolution	Washington, D.C.
18:00 EDT (UTC−04:00)	Acosta 13'; Canouse (yellow card) 58'; Steiber 89'	Report	Caicedo (yellow card) 12'; Agudelo (yellow card) 29'; Caldwell (yellow card) 56', (yellow card) 73' (red card)	Stadium: Audi Field; Attendance: 20,198; Referee: Ted Unkel

August 25, 2018 25	Philadelphia Union	1–0	New England Revolution	Chester, Pennsylvania
19:00 EDT (UTC−04:00)	Burke 58', (yellow card) 56'	Report	Mancienne (yellow card) 78'; Fagúndez (yellow card) 90+4'	Stadium: Talen Energy Stadium; Attendance: 18,052; Referee: Drew Fischer

September 1, 2018 26	New England Revolution	1–1	Portland Timbers	Foxborough, Massachusetts
19:30 EDT (UTC−04:00)	Caldwell 58', (yellow card) 76'; Caicedo (yellow card) 60'; Mancienne (yellow card) 87'; Penilla (yellow card) 90+1'	Report	Blanco (yellow card) 19'; Olum (yellow card) 67', (goal) 70'; Clark (yellow card) 90+1'	Stadium: Gillette Stadium; Attendance: 16,040; Referee: José Carlos Rivero

September 5, 2018 27	New York City FC	0–1	New England Revolution	New York, New York
19:00 EDT (UTC−04:00)	Castellanos (yellow card) 47'; Ring (yellow card) 89'	Report	Machado (yellow card) 15'; Wright 71'; Penilla (yellow card) 89'; Bye (yellow card) 90'	Stadium: Yankee Stadium; Attendance: 18,884; Referee: Armando Villarreal

September 15, 2018 28	Los Angeles FC	1–1	New England Revolution	Los Angeles, California
22:30 EDT (UTC−04:00)	Beitashour (yellow card) 41'; Ureña 52'	Report	Caldwell (yellow card) 37'; Bunbury (yellow card) 67'; Caicedo (yellow card) 77'; Bye 82'	Stadium: Banc of California Stadium; Attendance: 22,000; Referee: Mark Geiger

September 22, 2018 29	New England Revolution	2–2	Chicago Fire	Foxborough, Massachusetts
19:30 EDT (UTC−04:00)	Mlinar (yellow card) 31'; Bye (yellow card) 36'; Caldwell 62', (yellow card) 80'; Bunbury (yellow card) 69'; Penilla 70'	Report	Katai 19'; McCarty (yellow card) 58'; Mancienne 67' (o.g.); Kappelhof (yellow card) 78'	Stadium: Gillette Stadium; Attendance: 24,388; Referee: Joe Dickerson

September 29, 2018 30	Toronto FC	4–1	New England Revolution	Toronto, Ontario, Canada
19:30 EDT (UTC−04:00)	Giovinco 36'; Morrow (yellow card) 27'; Osorio (yellow card) 39'; Janson 53'; Vázquez 58' (pen.); Auro Jr. (yellow card) 65'; Delgado 81'	Report	Penilla 10'; Caldwell (yellow card) 18'	Stadium: BMO Field; Attendance: 24,710; Referee: Ismail Elfath

October 6, 2018 31	Atlanta United FC	2–1	New England Revolution	Atlanta, Georgia
15:30 EDT (UTC−04:00)	Bello 17'; Gressel 52'	Report	Zahibo (yellow card) 16'; Herivaux (yellow card) 38'; Hauche (yellow card) 56'; Caicedo (yellow card) 64'; Agudelo 90+2'	Stadium: Mercedes-Benz Stadium; Attendance: 45,122; Referee: Kevin Stott

October 13, 2018 32	New England Revolution	2–0	Orlando City SC	Foxborough, Massachusetts
19:30 EDT (UTC−04:00)	Penilla 51'; Fagúndez 55'	Report		Stadium: Gillette Stadium; Attendance: 19,775; Referee: David Gantar

October 18, 2018 33	Real Salt Lake	4–1	New England Revolution	Sandy, Utah
21:30 EDT (UTC−04:00)	Besler 4'; Saucedo 14'; Baird 29'; Kreilach 50'	Report	Rowe 69'	Stadium: Rio Tinto Stadium; Attendance: 19,536; Referee: Jair Marrufo

October 28, 2018 34	New England Revolution	1–0	Montreal Impact	Foxborough, Massachusetts
16:30 EDT (UTC−04:00)	Rowe (yellow card) 69'; Fagúndez 74', (yellow card) 75'; Farrell (yellow card) 83'; Zahibo (yellow card) 89'	Report	Taïder (yellow card) 90+2'	Stadium: Gillette Stadium; Attendance: 28,832; Referee: Armando Villarreal

=== 2018 Lamar Hunt U.S. Open Cup ===
Kickoff times are in EDT (UTC-04) unless shown otherwise

June 5, 2018 Fourth Round	Louisville City (Kentucky)	3–2	(Massachusetts) New England Revolution	Louisville, Kentucky
16:00	Jimenez 11' (Ownby) (yellow card) 85'; Lancaster 37' (Davis); Ownby 62'	Report	Segbers 5'; McMahon 37' (O.G.); Agudelo (yellow card) 90+4'	Stadium: Dr. Mark & Cindy Lynn Stadium; Attendance: 5,196; Referee: Aaron Hernandez

== Transfers ==
=== In ===
Per Major League Soccer and club policies terms of the deals do not get disclosed.

No.	Pos.	Nat.	Name	Age	Moving from	Type	Transfer window	Ends	Transfer fee	Source
	MF	(United States)	Isaac Angking	18	(United States) New England Revolution Academy	Free signing	Pre-season	Undisclosed		
91	DF	(Sweden)	Gabriel Somi	26	(Sweden) Östersunds FK	Transfer	Pre-season	Undisclosed		
23	MF	(France)	Wilfried Zahibo	24	(Spain) Gimnàstic	Transfer	Pre-season	Undisclosed		
70	FW	(Ecuador)	Cristian Penilla	26	(Mexico) Pachuca	On loan	Pre-season	Undisclosed		
3	DF	(United States)	Jalil Anibaba	29	(United States) Houston Dynamo	Free Transfer	Pre-season	Undisclosed		
15	DF	(United States)	Brandon Bye	22	(United States) Western Michigan University	Drafted	Pre-season	Undisclosed	SuperDraft	
12	DF	(Guatemala)	Nicolas Samayoa	22	(United States) Florida Gulf Coast University	Drafted	Pre-season	Undisclosed	SuperDraft	
16	DF	(United States)	Mark Segbers	21	(United States) University of Wisconsin	Drafted	Pre-season	Undisclosed	SuperDraft	
17	MF	(Colombia)	Luis Caicedo	21	(Colombia) Cortuluá	On loan	Mid-season	Undisclosed		
25	FW	(Argentina)	Guillermo Hauche	25	(Argentina) Racing Club	Free Transfer	Mid-season	Undisclosed		

=== Out ===
No.	Pos.	Nat.	Name	Age	Moving to	Type	Transfer window	Transfer fee	Source
4	DF	(Ivory Coast)	Benjamin Angoua	31	(France) Guingamp	Option Declined	Pre-season		
12	MF	(Ivory Coast)	Xavier Kouassi	23	(Switzerland) FC Sion	Option Declined	Pre-season		
33	MF	(United States)	Donnie Smith	27	(United States) Charlotte Independence	Option Declined	Pre-season		
27	DF	(United States)	Josh Smith	25		Option declined	Pre-season		
15	DF	(Jamaica)	Je-Vaughn Watson	34	(United States) Charlotte Independence	Option declined	Pre-season		
28	DF	(United States)	London Woodberry	26	(United States) Nashville SC	Option declined	Pre-season		
22	MF	(Japan)	Daigo Kobayashi	34	(United States) Las Vegas Lights FC	Option declined	Pre-season		
5	MF	(Ghana)	Gershon Koffie	26	(Sweden) Hammarby IF	Loan return	Pre-season		
23	FW	(Sierra Leone)	Kei Kamara	33	(Canada) Vancouver Whitecaps FC	Trade	Pre-season		

=== On Loan ===
No.	Pos.	Nat.	Name	Age	Moving to	Type	Transfer window	Transfer fee	Source
16	MF	(United States)	Mark Segbers	21	(United States) Orange County SC	Loan	Mid-season		
88	FW	(Benin)	Femi Hollinger-Janzen	24	(United States) Tulsa Roughnecks FC	Loan	Mid-season		
12	DF	(Guatemala)	Nicolas Samayoa	22	(United States) Las Vegas Lights FC	Loan	Mid-season		

== Player statistics ==
=== Top scorers ===
Rank	Position	Number	Name	MLS	MLS Cup	Open Cup	Total
1	FW	10	(United States) Teal Bunbury	11	0	0	11
1	MF	70	(Ecuador) Cristian Penilla	11	0	0	11
3	FW	14	(Uruguay) Diego Fagúndez	7	0	0	7
4	MF	23	(France) Wilfried Zahibo	4	0	0	4
5	DF	2	(United States) Andrew Farrell	2	0	0	2
5	MF	6	(United States) Scott Caldwell	2	0	0	2
5	FW	17	(United States) Juan Agudelo	2	0	0	2
4	FW	7	(Canada) Brian Wright	1	0	0	1
4	DF	8	(United States) Chris Tierney	1	0	0	1
4	DF	15	(United States) Brandon Bye	1	0	0	1
4	FW	16	(United States) Mark Segbers	0	0	1	1
4	MF	27	(Colombia) Luis Caicedo	1	0	0	1
Own Goals				1	0	1	2
Total				44	0	2	45

As of October 2, 2018

=== Disciplinary record ===
Number	Nation	Position	Name	MLS		U.S. Open Cup		Total	
Number	Nation	Position	Name	Booked	Sent off (straight red)	Booked	Sent off (straight red)	Booked	Sent off (straight red)
3	(United States)	DF	Jalil Anibaba	2	0	0	0	2	0
4	(France)	DF	Claude Dielna	6	1	0	0	5	1
6	(United States)	MF	Scott Caldwell	2	0	0	0	2	0
8	(United States)	DF	Chris Tierney	1	0	0	0	1	0
9	(Hungary)	FW	Krisztián Németh	1	0	0	0	1	0
10	(United States)	FW/MF	Teal Bunbury	3	0	0	0	2	0
11	(United States)	MF	Kelyn Rowe	2	0	0	0	2	0
14	(Uruguay)	MF	Diego Fagúndez	5	0	0	0	5	0
15	(United States)	MF/DF	Brandon Bye	1	0	0	0	1	0
17	(United States)	FW	Juan Agudelo	0	0	1	0	1	0
19	(Slovakia)	DF	Antonio Delamea Mlinar	2	1	0	0	2	1
23	(France)	MF	Wilfried Zahibo	2	0	0	0	2	0
27	(Colombia)	DF/MF	Luis Caicedo	4	0	0	0	4	0
30	(United States)	GK	Matt Turner	1	0	0	0	1	0
91	(Syria)	DF/MF	Gabriel Somi	3	0	0	0	3	0
			TOTALS	35	2	1	0	36	2

As of June 9, 2018
