= Guillermo Hauche =

Argentine footballer

Personal information
- Full name: Guillermo Fernando Hauche
- Date of birth: March 31, 1993 (age 33)
- Place of birth: La Plata, Buenos Aires, Argentina
- Height: 1.80 m (5 ft 11 in)
- Position: Forward

Team information
- Current team: Sportivo Luqueno
- Number: 10

Youth career
- Lanús

Senior career*
Years	Team	Apps	(Gls)
2013–2018	Racing Club	3	(0)
2015	→ Almagro (loan)	8	(0)
2017	→ Unión Española (loan)	12	(0)
2018	→ Deportes Temuco (loan)	8	(0)
2018	New England Revolution	4	(0)
2021–2024	General Caballero	81	(6)
2024–	Sportivo Luqueno	6	(0)
- * Club domestic league appearances and goals as of 25 June 2023

Guillermo Fernando Hauche (born March 31, 1993) is an Argentine footballer who plays as a forward for Paraguayan team Sportivo Luqueno.

== Life and career ==
=== Early career ===
Hauche was born in La Plata, in the Buenos Aires Province of Argentina. He played youth football with Lanús before joining Racing Club in 2013. He made his senior debut on March 16, 2014, replacing Luis Ibáñez after 51 minutes of a 2–0 Primera División defeat away to Newell's Old Boys. According to Olé, he tried to use his pace to unsettle the opposition, and near the end had a clean shot that went just over the bar. Hauche was involved in controversy towards the end of that season when, after Racing's local rivals Independiente won a match that took them closer to promotion to the Primera, he tweeted an insulting message about the club. He started the last two matches of the 2013–14 Primera División season, but those were his last appearances for Racing's first team.

Hauche joined Almagro of the Primera B Metropolitana on loan for the 2015 season. He made eight appearances without scoring, before being dropped from the squad. When he returned to Racing, he was restricted to reserve-team football.

In February 2017, Hauche had a trial with Aldosivi, newly relegated from the Primera División. Despite a goal in a friendly match against Estudiantes, no contract ensued. In June, he signed for Unión Española of the Chilean Primera División.

=== New England Revolution ===
On September 13, 2018, Hauche signed with the New England Revolution of Major League Soccer. Prior to joining the Revolution, Hauche had been without a club since early May, following the end of his loan stint with Deportes Temuco. At the time of his signing, the Revolution were five points out of a playoff position with six matches left in the regular season, and were looking to add attacking pieces to help with their playoff push. Revolution GM Mike Burns praised Hauche as a very technical player who would provide the team with another attacking option heading into the final stretch of the season. Head coach Brad Friedel was equally complimentary of Hauche's skill set, calling him "a goal scorer and a goal creator.”

He has a very good attitude about the game. He works on both sides of the ball. He also adds another dimension to scoring goals, whether it be with his final pass, whether it be with his cross, or his strike himself. He’s an attack-minded player. He’s very gifted on the ball. He has a completely different skill-set, different type of player, different stature of player than we have on the team.

— Brad Friedel

On September 22, 2018, Hauche made his league debut, deployed as a left back, at home against Chicago Fire FC as a 46th-minute substitute for Brandon Bye. The Revolution would draw the match 2-2. Hauche received high praise from teammates and his coach alike in his debut, with Friedel calling him "a very, very good player in the opponent’s attacking half of the field." and adding that Hauche "knows how to unlock defenses, and we’re just going to try to get him up to match speed as quickly as possible." Teammate Andrew Farrell called Hauche a "great player on and off the field."

He would make his first start for the club the following week, this time as a right winger, at BMO Field against Toronto FC. The Revolution would lose the match 4–1. He would start again in the Revolution's 2–1 away loss to Atlanta United FC.

Hauche concluded the 2018 season with a 47.8 accurate pass percentage in 175 minutes with no goals and no assists in four scoring chances.

New England declined Hauche's contract at the end of their 2018 season.

=== Later career ===
In 2021, Hauche signed with General Caballero Sport Club in Paraguay.
