= Kelyn Rowe =

American soccer player (born 1991)

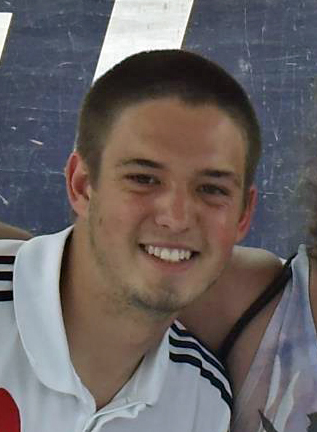
- Rowe in 2012

Personal information
- Full name: Kelyn Jaynes Rowe
- Date of birth: December 2, 1991 (age 34)
- Place of birth: Federal Way, Washington, United States
- Height: 5 ft 8 in (1.73 m)
- Position: Midfielder

Youth career
- 2007–2010: Crossfire Premier

College career
Years	Team	Apps	(Gls)
2010–2011	UCLA Bruins	46	(13)

Senior career*
Years	Team	Apps	(Gls)
2011	Washington Crossfire	4	(0)
2012–2018	New England Revolution	206	(29)
2019	Sporting Kansas City	14	(0)
2019	→ Swope Park Rangers (loan)	2	(3)
2019	Real Salt Lake	4	(0)
2019	→ Real Monarchs (loan)	2	(0)
2020	New England Revolution	16	(0)
2021–2023	Seattle Sounders FC	62	(2)
2025	Ballard FC	0	(0)
Total		310	(34)

International career^{‡}
2008–2010	United States U18	5	(0)
2010–2011	United States U20	6	(3)
2017–2018	United States	4	(1)
- * Club domestic league appearances and goals as of October 22, 2022 ‡ National team caps and goals as of January 28, 2018

Kelyn Jaynes Rowe (born December 2, 1991) is an American former professional and current semi-professional soccer player who plays as a midfielder.

== Early life ==
Rowe was born to his parents Scott and Sherri, he grew up in Federal Way, Washington alongside his two sisters. He attended Federal Way High School, becoming an immediate star on the school's varsity soccer team while just a freshman. By his senior year, Rowe had been named a Parade and ESPN RISE All-American, as well as being awarded the 2010 Class 4A Player of the Year by multiple publications. While in high school, Rowe played club soccer for Crossfire Redmond's youth system, where he was named in the U-16 West All-Conference First Team in 2007 and 2008. As a senior, Rowe was ranked fifth in Top Drawer Soccer's class of 2010 recruit list.

== Career ==
=== College and amateur ===
Rowe appeared as an attacking midfielder for the UCLA Bruins, and was a standout player during his freshman year in 2010, ranking second in the Pac-10 Conference in assists with ten and winning the Pac-10 Freshman of the Year award.

Rowe started 21 games for the Bruins in his freshman year in 2010, scoring seven goals and adding ten assists. As well as winning the Pac-10 Freshman of the Year award, Rowe was also selected to the All-Pac-10 First-team and Third-team All-American, while leading the Bruins to the Louisville, Kentucky Regional Game in the 2010 NCAA Men's Division I Soccer Tournament.

Rowe took the spring quarter off at UCLA to train and play with the U.S. U-20 national team full-time. In 2011, Rowe spent the summer on trial with the German Bundesliga club 1. FC Köln before returning to UCLA for his sophomore season.

During Rowe's sophomore campaign he scored six goals and tallied 10 assists during UCLA's run to the semifinals of the NCAA College Cup.

=== Professional ===
Rowe was drafted 3rd overall in the 2012 MLS SuperDraft, by the New England Revolution. Known for his ball skills and passing ability, he was listed in January 2012 by ESPN as one of the top 10 American players under 21.

Rowe made his MLS debut, and his first start, on March 10 in the 2012 New England Revolution season opener, a 1–0 loss to the San Jose Earthquakes. He made his Revolution home debut two weeks later, in a 1–0 win over the Portland Timbers on march 24.

Rowe scored his first MLS goal in a surprising win over defending MLS Champions the Los Angeles Galaxy 3–1 on the road on March 31. He concluded his rookie campaign with three goals and five assists across 30 league appearances.

Rowe won MLS Player of the Week honors for his two-goal performance in a 5–1 win over the Philadelphia Union in Week 25 of the 2013 New England Revolution season. He led the club in assists in 2013, with eight and scored a career best seven goals.

Rowe was named Revolution Humanitarian of the Year four straight seasons, from 2014–2017. In 2014, Rowe appeared on 27, games scoring five goals as the Revolution reached the MLS Cup final where they were defeated by the LA Galaxy 2-1.

In 2015 and 2016, Rowe was the only Revolution player to receive MLS Player of the Week honors; winning the nomination on March 28, 2015 (match week 4) for his two goal performance against the San Jose Earthquakes, and in match week 28 of 2016 for a similar performance against the Montreal Impact in which he recorded a brace and an assist on September 17. He was named Revolution Most Valuable Player for the 2016 New England Revolution season, setting career highs in starts, with 32, and minutes played (2,787), along with scoring five goals and seven assists.

In June 2018, The Revolution were approached by an unnamed Israeli Premier League club regarding a potential transfer for Rowe, however no deal was made as terms could not be agreed upon by the teams.

On December 18, 2018, Rowe was traded to Colorado Rapids in exchange for Edgar Castillo, then was immediately traded to Sporting Kansas City in exchange for Diego Rubio, $200,000 of General Allocation Money and $100,000 of Targeted Allocation Money.

Rowe was further traded to Real Salt Lake on August 7, 2019. During the 2019 season, he was occasionally sent to play for Real Salt Lake's USL affiliate club, Real Monarchs, for whom he made two appearances. The Monarchs would go on to win the USL Cup that season.

Rowe was signed as a free agent by the New England Revolution on December 4, 2019, with whom he made 16 appearances for during the 2020 season.

Rowe was traded to the Seattle Sounders on January 12, 2021. He scored his first goal for the club on July 7 against the Houston Dynamo. In 2022, he won his first trophy helping Seattle win the CONCACAF Champions League. He was released by the Sounders at the conclusion of the 2023 season. Rowe announced his retirement from professional soccer on February 2, 2024, via social media posts; he stated that he wanted to "end on a high note" and look after his health.

=== After professional retirement ===
On March 16, 2025, Ballard FC announced that Kelyn Rowe would be joining the club for their run in the 2025 U.S. Open Cup. Rowe later confirmed that he was only joining the team for one match. Ballard FC lost their first match to Spokane Velocity FC, with Rowe starting and being substituted off in the 79th minute. He returned to the club's roster in the fall for Ballard's qualifier games for the 2026 U.S. Open Cup.

== International ==
Rowe played for the U.S. U-18 national team, and the U.S. U-20 national team, starting in all three games, scoring three goals and assisting on one in the 2011 CONCACAF U-20 Championship tournament, while wearing the number 10 jersey.

Rowe was added to the December U-23 Men's National Team training camp roster in 2012.

Rowe was named to the senior national team squad for the 2017 CONCACAF Gold Cup. He made his debut in a friendly match against Ghana on July 1, 2017, and scored his first goal in a group stage match against Nicaragua on July 15, 2017.

== Personal life ==
During his playing career Rowe spent time promoting childhood cancer awareness. He had his own NEGU Crew program in partnership with the Jessie Rees Foundation. The program started in 2015, while Rowe was a member of the New England Revolution and would bring families experiencing childhood cancer to home games of the team that Rowe played for.

Rowe is the founder of the winery Vino FC.

== Career statistics ==
As of match played March 20, 2025

Club	Season	League			Playoffs		National cup		Continental		Total	
Club	Season	Division	Apps	Goals	Apps	Goals	Apps	Goals	Apps	Goals	Apps	Goals
Washington Crossfire	2011	PDL	4	0	–		–		–		4	0
New England Revolution	2012	MLS	30	3	–		1	1	–		31	4
New England Revolution	2013	MLS	33	7	2	1	3	4	–		38	12
New England Revolution	2014	MLS	27	5	5	0	2	1	–		34	6
New England Revolution	2015	MLS	33	7	1	0	1	0	–		35	7
New England Revolution	2016	MLS	33	5	–		4	0	–		37	5
New England Revolution	2017	MLS	23	1	–		1	0	–		24	1
New England Revolution	2018	MLS	27	1	–		1	0	–		28	1
New England Revolution	Total		206	29	8	1	13	6	0	0	227	36
Sporting Kansas City	2019	MLS	14	0	–		1	0	4	0	19	0
Swope Park Rangers (loan)	2019	USL	2	3	–		–		–		2	3
Real Salt Lake	2019	MLS	4	0	1	0	–		–		5	0
Real Monarchs (loan)	2019	USL	2	0	–		–		–		2	0
New England Revolution	2020	MLS	16	0	3	0	–		–		19	0
Seattle Sounders FC	2021	MLS	34	1	1	0	–		3	0	38	1
Seattle Sounders FC	2022	MLS	28	1	0	0	1	0	8	1	37	2
Seattle Sounders FC	2023	MLS	9	0	1	0	1	0	0	0	11	0
Seattle Sounders FC	Total		71	2	2	0	2	0	11	1	86	3
Ballard FC	2025	USL2	–		–		1	0	–		1	0
Career total			319	34	14	1	17	6	15	1	365	42

=== International goals ===
Scores and results list the United States's goal tally first.

No.	Date	Venue	Opponent	Score	Result	Competition	Ref.
1.	July 15, 2017	FirstEnergy Stadium, Cleveland, United States	Nicaragua	2–0	3–0	2017 CONCACAF Gold Cup	

== Honors ==
Seattle Sounders FC

- CONCACAF Champions League: 2022

United States

- CONCACAF Gold Cup: 2017

Individual

- Pac-12 Conference Player of the Year: 2011
- Pac-12 Conference Freshman Player of the Year: 2010
- Pac-12 Conference First-team: 2010, 2011
- NSCAA Far West Region First-team: 2010
- NCAA All-American Third-team: 2010
- New England Revolution Humanitarian of the Year: 2014, 2015, 2016, 2017
- New England Revolution Team MVP: 2016
