= 2016 New England Revolution season =

New England Revolution
2016 season
- Owner: Robert Kraft
- Head coach: Jay Heaps
- Stadium: Gillette Stadium
- MLS: Conference: 7th Overall: 14th
- U.S. Open Cup: Runner-Up
- Top goalscorer: Kei Kamara; Juan Agudelo (7)
- Highest home attendance: 39,587 (Oct. 23 vs. Montreal)
- Lowest home attendance: 10,144 (Apr. 27 vs. Portland)
- Average home league attendance: 20,185
Home colors	Away colors

The 2016 season was New England Revolution's 21st season of existence and their 21st season in Major League Soccer, the top-flight of American soccer.

== Squad ==
=== Roster ===
As of May 14, 2016. Source: New England Revolution Roster

No.	Name	Nationality	Position	Date of birth (age)	Previous club
Goalkeepers
18	Brad Knighton	(United States)	GK	February 6, 1985 (age 41)	(Canada) Vancouver Whitecaps FC
22	Bobby Shuttleworth	(United States)	GK	May 13, 1987 (age 39)	(United States) Austin Aztex
30	Matt Turner	(United States)	GK	June 24, 1994 (age 31)	(United States) Fairfield University
1	Cody Cropper	(United States)	GK	February 16, 1993 (age 33)	(England) Milton Keynes Dons
Defenders
2	Andrew Farrell	(United States)	CB	April 2, 1992 (age 34)	(United States) University of Louisville
3	Jordan McCrary	(United States)	DF	July 28, 1993 (age 32)	(United States) University of North Carolina
8	Chris Tierney	(United States)	LB	January 9, 1986 (age 40)	(United States) University of Virginia
15	Je-Vaughn Watson	(Jamaica)	DF	October 22, 1983 (age 42)	(United States) F.C. Dallas
23	José Gonçalves	(Portugal)	CB	September 17, 1985 (age 40)	(Switzerland) FC Sion
25	Darrius Barnes	(United States)	RB	December 24, 1986 (age 39)	(United States) Duke University
28	London Woodberry	(United States)	CB	May 28, 1991 (age 35)	(United States) Arizona United
Midfielders
4	Steve Neumann	(United States)	M	October 7, 1991 (age 34)	(United States) Georgetown University
6	Scott Caldwell	(United States)	M	March 15, 1991 (age 35)	(United States) University of Akron
7	Gershon Koffie	(Ghana)	M	August 25, 1991 (age 34)	(Canada) Vancouver Whitecaps FC
11	Kelyn Rowe	(United States)	M	December 25, 1991 (age 34)	(United States) University of California, Los Angeles
12	Xavier Kouassi	(Ivory Coast)	M	December 28, 1989 (age 36)	(Switzerland) FC Sion
14	Diego Fagundez	(Uruguay)	M	February 14, 1995 (age 31)	(United States) New England Revolution Academy
16	Daigo Kobayashi	(Japan)	M	February 19, 1983 (age 43)	(Canada) Vancouver Whitecaps FC
21	Zachary Herivaux	(Haiti)	M	February 1, 1996 (age 30)	(United States) New England Revolution Academy
24	Lee Nguyen	(United States)	M	October 7, 1986 (age 39)	(Vietnam) Becamex Binh Duong
33	Donnie Smith	(United States)	M	December 7, 1990 (age 35)	(United States) Carolina Dynamo
Forwards
10	Teal Bunbury	(United States)	F	February 27, 1990 (age 36)	(United States) Sporting Kansas City
13	Kei Kamara	(Sierra Leone)	F	September 1, 1984 (age 41)	(United States) Columbus Crew SC
17	Juan Agudelo	(United States)	F	November 23, 1992 (age 33)	(Netherlands) FC Utrecht
88	Femi Hollinger-Janzen	(Benin)	F	December 14, 1993 (age 32)	(United States) Indiana University

=== Technical staff ===
Position	Staff
Head Coach	(United States) Jay Heaps
First Assistant Coach	(United States) Tom Soehn
Goalkeeping Coach	(Canada) Remi Roy
Strength and Conditioning Coach	(United States) Nick Downing
Technical Director	(United States) Ross Duncan
Soccer Operations Manager	(United States) Jason Gove
Soccer Operations Analyst	(United States) Tim Crawford
Equipment Manager	(United States) Scott Emmens
Head Athletic Trainer	(United States) Evan Allen
Assistant Athletic Trainer	(United States) Phil Madore
Massage Therapist	(United States) Glenn O'Connor
Head Team Physician	(United States) Scott Martin, M.D.

Last updated: May 12, 2016
Source: Club Staff

== Player movement ==
=== In ===
Per Major League Soccer and club policies terms of the deals do not get disclosed.

Date	Player	Position	Previous club	Notes	Ref
February 1, 2016	(Ivory Coast) Xavier Kouassi	MF	FC Sion	Free	
February 11, 2016	(Ghana) Gershon Koffie	MF	Vancouver Whitecaps FC	Trade	
March 3, 2016	(United States) Charlie Horton	GK	Leeds United	Free	
March 3, 2016	(United States) Matt Turner	GK	Fairfield Stags	SuperDraft	
March 3, 2016	(England) Michael Gamble	FW	Wake Forest Demon Deacons	SuperDraft	
March 4, 2016	(Jamaica) Je-Vaughn Watson	DF	FC Dallas	Trade	
March 16, 2016	(Benin) Femi Hollinger-Janzen	FW	Indiana Hoosiers	SuperDraft	
May 12, 2016	(Sierra Leone) Kei Kamara	FW	Columbus Crew	Trade	
August 18, 2016	(United States) Cody Cropper	GK	Southampton	Free	

=== Out ===
Date	Player	Position	Destination club	Notes	Ref
December 17, 2015	(United States) Kevin Alston	DF	Orlando City SC	Re-Entry Draft	
March 3, 2016	(United States) Charlie Horton	GK	D.C. United	Trade	
March 4, 2016	(United States) Jermaine Jones	MF	Colorado Rapids	Trade	
June 13, 2016	(England) Michael Gamble	FW		Waived	
August 3, 2016	(United States) Charlie Davies	FW	Philadelphia Union	Trade	

=== Loans ===
==== Loans in ====
Date	Player	Position	Previous club	Notes	Ref
January 22, 2016	(Guinea-Bissau) Sambinha	DF	Sporting B	One Year Loan	

== Matches and results ==
=== Desert Diamond Cup ===
February 17, 2016	Real Salt Lake	3–3	New England Revolution	Tucson, Arizona
22:00 EDT	Morales (yellow card) 23', (goal) 54'; Maund (yellow card) 46'; Olave 68'; García 77'	Report	Gamble 13'; Davies 47', 84'; Woodberry (yellow card) 81' (yellow-red card) 83'	Stadium: Kino North Grandstand

February 20, 2016	Sporting Kansas City	1–1	New England Revolution	Tucson, Arizona
21:30 EDT	Zusi 11'	Report	Bunbury 58'; Herivaux (yellow card) 75'	Stadium: Kino North Stadium

February 24, 2016	Houston Dynamo	1–2	New England Revolution	Tucson, Arizona
19:30 EDT	Agus (yellow card) 61'; Torres 67'; Rocha (yellow card) 82'	Report	Bunbury 48'; Neumann 69'; Herivaux (yellow card) 73'; Gamble (yellow card) 87'	Stadium: Kino North Grandstand

February 27, 2016	Columbus Crew	0–1	New England Revolution	Tucson, Arizona
21:00 EDT		Report	Bunbury 21'	Stadium: Kino North Stadium

=== MLS regular season ===
Win Tie Loss

March 6, 2016 MLS 1	Houston Dynamo	3–3	New England Revolution	Houston, Texas
15:00 EDT	Maidana 45+1'; Wenger 50'; Anibaba (yellow card) 55'; Barnes 77'	http://matchcenter.mlssoccer.com/matchcenter/2016-03-06-houston-dynamo-vs-new-england-revolution/recap MLS	Fagúndez 3'; Bunbury (yellow card) 27'; Watson (yellow card) 49'; Davies 52'; Kobayashi 90+3'	Stadium: BBVA Compass Stadium; Attendance: 21,594; Referee: Jose Carlos Rivero

March 12, 2016 MLS 2	New England Revolution	0–0	D.C. United	Foxborough, Massachusetts
15:00 EDT	Koffie (yellow card) 26'	http://matchcenter.mlssoccer.com/matchcenter/2016-03-12-new-england-revolution-vs-dc-united MLS	Acosta (yellow card) 45+1'; Franklin (yellow card) 56'; DeLeon (yellow card) 64'; Sarvas (yellow card) 87'	Stadium: Gillette Stadium; Attendance: 16,102; Referee: Silviu Petrescu

March 20, 2016 MLS 3	Philadelphia Union	3–0	New England Revolution	Chester, Pennsylvania
14:30 EDT	Sapong 18', 33'; Fabinho (yellow card) 25'; Le Toux 90+3'	http://matchcenter.mlssoccer.com/matchcenter/2016-03-20-philadelphia-union-vs-new-england-revolution MLS	Watson (red card) 36'; Tierney (yellow card) 57'; Fagúndez (yellow card) 58'	Stadium: Talen Energy Stadium; Attendance: 17,027; Referee: Nima Saghafi

March 26, 2016 MLS 4	New York City FC	1–1	New England Revolution	New York, New York
15:00 EDT	McNamara 10', (yellow card) 90+2'; Iraola (yellow card) 36'; Bravo (yellow card) 55'; Pirlo (yellow card) 68'	http://matchcenter.mlssoccer.com/matchcenter/2016-03-26-new-york-city-fc-vs-new-england-revolution MLS	Tierney 38'; Koffie (red card) 51'; Caldwell (yellow card) 65'	Stadium: Yankee Stadium; Attendance: 23,425; Referee: Ricardo Salazar

April 1, 2016 MLS 5	New England Revolution	1–0	New York Red Bulls	Foxborough, Massachusetts
19:00 EDT	Agudelo (yellow card) 39'; Fagúndez 55'; Bunbury (yellow card) 86'	http://matchcenter.mlssoccer.com/matchcenter/2016-04-01-new-england-revolution-vs-new-york-red-bulls MLS	Robles (yellow card) 55'; Felipe (red card) 61'	Stadium: Gillette Stadium; Attendance: 11,849; Referee: Mark Geiger

April 9, 2016 MLS 6	New England Revolution	1–1	Toronto FC	Foxborough, Massachusetts
16:00 EDT	Rowe 14'; Koffie (yellow card) 20'	http://matchcenter.mlssoccer.com/matchcenter/2016-04-09-new-england-revolution-vs-toronto-fc MLS	Giovinco 58'; Morrow (yellow card) 58'; Altidore (yellow card) 61'; Johnson (yellow card) 73'; Babouli (yellow card) 90+1'	Stadium: Gillette Stadium; Attendance: 16,935; Referee: Edvin Jurisevic

April 17, 2016 MLS 7	Orlando City SC	2–2	New England Revolution	Orlando, Florida
15:30 EDT	Kaká 2' (pen.); Nocerino (yellow card) 56'; Molino 90+2'	http://matchcenter.mlssoccer.com/matchcenter/2016-04-17-orlando-city-sc-vs-new-england-revolution MLS	Koffie (yellow card) 12'; Bunbury 37'; Nguyen 90+6' (pen.)	Stadium: Citrus Bowl; Attendance: 36,048; Referee: Baldomero Toledo

April 23, 2016 MLS 8	D.C. United	3–0	New England Revolution	Washington, D.C.
17:30 EDT	Sarvas (yellow card) 21'; Neagle 33' (pen.); Franklin (yellow card) 62'; Acosta 86'; Saborío 90'	http://matchcenter.mlssoccer.com/matchcenter/2016-04-23-dc-united-vs-new-england-revolution MLS	Caldwell (yellow card) 45+1'; Gonçalves (yellow card) 68'	Stadium: RFK Stadium; Attendance: 16,005; Referee: Alan Kelly

April 27, 2016 MLS 9	New England Revolution	1–1	Portland Timbers	Foxborough, Massachusetts
19:30 EDT	Fagúndez (yellow card) 54'; Taylor 89' (o.g.); Nguyen (yellow card) 90+4'	http://matchcenter.mlssoccer.com/matchcenter/2016-04-27-new-england-revolution-vs-portland-timbers MLS	Valentin (yellow card) 45+1'; Barmby 64'	Stadium: Gillette Stadium; Attendance: 10,144; Referee: Ismail Elfath

April 30, 2016 MLS 10	New England Revolution	2–2	Orlando City SC	Foxborough, Massachusetts
19:30 EDT	Fagúndez 7', (yellow card) 78'; Agudelo 71'	http://matchcenter.mlssoccer.com/matchcenter/2016-04-30-new-england-revolution-vs-orlando-city-sc MLS	Cerén (yellow card) 24'; Molino 30'; Rivas (yellow card) 86', (goal) 90'; Ramos (yellow card) 90+4'	Stadium: Gillette Stadium; Attendance: 25,203; Referee: Robert Sibiga

May 8, 2016 MLS 11	LA Galaxy	4–2	New England Revolution	Carson, California
15:30 EDT	Keane 13', 45' dos Santos 24'; DeLaGarza (yellow card) 90+1'; Gerrard 90+3'	http://matchcenter.mlssoccer.com/matchcenter/2016-05-08-la-galaxy-vs-new-england-revolution MLS	Watson (yellow card) 58'; Rowe 67'; Agudelo 70'	Stadium: StubHub Center; Attendance: 21,237; Referee: Hilario Grajeda

May 14, 2016 MLS 12	New England Revolution	2–0	Chicago Fire	Foxborough, Massachusetts
19:30 EDT	Nguyen 22'; Koffie (yellow card) 24'; Woodberry (yellow card) 57'; Agudelo (yellow card) 80'; Hollinger-Janzen 84'	http://matchcenter.mlssoccer.com/matchcenter/2016-05-14-new-england-revolution-vs-chicago-fire MLS	Álvarez (yellow card) 19'	Stadium: Gillette Stadium; Attendance: 18,997; Referee: Jorge Gonzalez

May 21, 2016 MLS 13	New England Revolution	2–4	FC Dallas	Foxborough, Massachusetts
19:30 EDT	Shuttleworth (yellow card) 3'; Agudelo 23'; Nguyen 26' (pen.)	http://matchcenter.mlssoccer.com/matchcenter/2016-05-21-new-england-revolution-vs-fc-dallas/recap MLS	Akindele 5' (pen.), 90'; Harris 36'; Figueroa (yellow card) 43'; Castillo 70'; Ulloa (yellow card) 81'	Stadium: Gillette Stadium; Attendance: 23,472; Referee: Silviu Petrescu

May 28, 2016 MLS 14	New England Revolution	2–1	Seattle Sounders FC	Foxborough, Massachusetts
19:30 EDT	Nguyen 24' (pen.); Fagúndez (yellow card) 35'; Hollinger-Janzen 80'	http://matchcenter.mlssoccer.com/matchcenter/2016-05-28-new-england-revolution-vs-seattle-sounders-fc/recap MLS	Kovar 7'	Stadium: Gillette Stadium; Attendance: 21,456; Referee: Jose Carlos Rivero

June 18, 2016 MLS 15	Vancouver Whitecaps FC	1–2	New England Revolution	Vancouver, British Columbia
19:00 EDT	Smith (yellow card) 35'; Jacobson (yellow card) 36'; Mezquida 41'; Laba (yellow card) 82'	http://matchcenter.mlssoccer.com/matchcenter/2016-06-18-vancouver-whitecaps-fc-vs-new-england-revolution MLS	Woodberry 31', (yellow card) 40'; Rowe 55'; Gonçalves (yellow card) 88'	Stadium: BC Place; Attendance: 22,120; Referee: Ismail Elfath

June 25, 2016 MLS 16	D.C. United	2–0	New England Revolution	Washington, D.C.
19:00 EDT	Neagle 20'; Opare (yellow card) 22'; Franklin 27'; Espíndola (yellow card) 57'; Acosta (yellow card) 67'	http://matchcenter.mlssoccer.com/matchcenter/2016-06-22-dc-united-vs-new-england-revolution MLS		Stadium: RFK Stadium; Attendance: 16,051; Referee: Marcos de Oliveira

July 2, 2016 MLS 17	Montreal Impact	3–2	New England Revolution	Montreal, Quebec
17:30 EDT	Salazar 40', 48'; Piatti 54' (pen.)	http://matchcenter.mlssoccer.com/matchcenter/2016-07-02-montreal-impact-vs-new-england-revolution MLS	Kamara 18', 33'; Knighton (yellow card) 53'; Caldwell (yellow card) 55'	Stadium: Saputo Stadium; Attendance: 20,279; Referee: Chris Penso

July 6, 2016 MLS 18	New England Revolution	0–1	New York City FC	Foxborough, Massachusetts
19:30 EDT	Watson (yellow card) 70'; Shuttleworth (red card) 90+4'	http://matchcenter.mlssoccer.com/matchcenter/2016-07-06-new-england-revolution-vs-new-york-city-fc MLS	Lampard 58'	Stadium: Gillette Stadium; Attendance: 18,187; Referee: David Gantar

July 9, 2016 MLS 19	New England Revolution	3–1	Columbus Crew SC	Foxborough, Massachusetts
19:30 EDT	Nguyen 3'; Woodberry (yellow card) 19'; Farrell (yellow card) 30'; Trapp 34' (o.g.); Knighton (yellow card) 67'; Kamara 71'; Rowe (yellow card) 79'	http://matchcenter.mlssoccer.com/matchcenter/2016-07-09-new-england-revolution-vs-columbus-crew-sc MLS	Tchani (yellow card) 27'; Kamara 42'	Stadium: Gillette Stadium; Attendance: 18,434; Referee: Mark Geiger

July 16, 2016 MLS 20	Real Salt Lake	0–0	New England Revolution	Sandy, Utah
22:00 EDT	Maund (yellow card) 34'	http://matchcenter.mlssoccer.com/matchcenter/2016-07-16-real-salt-lake-vs-new-england-revolution MLS	Nguyen (yellow card) 44'; Woodberry (yellow card) 46'; Kamara (yellow card) 72'	Stadium: Rio Tinto Stadium; Attendance: 19,246; Referee: Ismail Elfath

July 23, 2016 MLS 21	New England Revolution	1–0	Chicago Fire	Foxborough, Massachusetts
19:30 EDT	Bunbury (yellow card) 77'; Watson 85'	http://matchcenter.mlssoccer.com/matchcenter/2016-07-23-new-england-revolution-vs-chicago-fire MLS	de Leeuw (yellow card) 30'; Accam (yellow card) 90+1'	Stadium: Gillette Stadium; Attendance: 21,872; Referee: Juan Guzman

July 31, 2016 MLS 22	Orlando City SC	3–1	New England Revolution	Orlando, Florida
19:30 EDT	Larin 46'; Molino 64', 83'; Higuita (yellow card) 80'	http://matchcenter.mlssoccer.com/matchcenter/2016-07-31-orlando-city-sc-vs-new-england-revolution MLS	Caldwell (yellow card) 18'; Kamara 19'	Stadium: Citrus Bowl; Attendance: 27,768; Referee: Silviu Petrescu

August 6, 2016 MLS 23	Toronto FC	4–1	New England Revolution	Toronto, Ontario
19:30 EDT	Giovinco 20', 29', 76' (pen.); Altidore 90+3'	http://matchcenter.mlssoccer.com/matchcenter/2016-08-06-toronto-fc-vs-new-england-revolution MLS	Koffie (yellow card) 54'; Bunbury 88'	Stadium: BMO Field; Attendance: 27,495; Referee: Ted Unkel

August 13, 2016 MLS 24	New England Revolution	0–4	Philadelphia Union	Foxborough, Massachusetts
19:30 EDT	Caldwell (yellow card) 18'; Kamara (yellow card) 41'	http://matchcenter.mlssoccer.com/matchcenter/2016-08-13-new-england-revolution-vs-philadelphia-union MLS	Sapong 2'; Pontius 51'; Marquez 54'; Herbers (yellow card) 80'; Alberg 90+3'	Stadium: Gillette Stadium; Attendance: 17,127; Referee: Robert Sibiga

August 20, 2016 MLS 25	New England Revolution	0–2	Columbus Crew SC	Foxborough, Massachusetts
19:30 EDT	Woodberry (yellow card) 26'; Bunbury (yellow card) 35'; Kamara (yellow card) 86'	http://matchcenter.mlssoccer.com/matchcenter/2016-08-20-new-england-revolution-vs-columbus-crew-sc MLS	Finlay 8'; Higuaín 49'	Stadium: Gillette Stadium; Attendance: 20,224; Referee: Edwin Jurisevic

August 24, 2016 MLS 26	San Jose Earthquakes	0–0	New England Revolution	San Jose, California
22:30 EDT	Godoy (yellow card) 25'; Cerén (yellow card) 54'; Dawkins (yellow card) 75'	http://matchcenter.mlssoccer.com/matchcenter/2016-08-24-san-jose-earthquakes-vs-new-england-revolution MLS	Koffie (yellow card) 82'; Bunbury (yellow card) 87'	Stadium: Avaya Stadium; Attendance: 18,000; Referee: Hilario Grajeda

August 28, 2016 MLS 27	New York Red Bulls	1–0	New England Revolution	Harrison, New Jersey
14:30 EDT	Wright-Phillips 55'; Verón (yellow card) 90+4'; Robles (yellow card) 90+8'	http://matchcenter.mlssoccer.com/matchcenter/2016-08-28-new-york-red-bulls-vs-new-england-revolution MLS	Koffie (yellow card) 71'; Rowe (yellow card) 85'; Agudelo (yellow card) 90+8'	Stadium: Red Bull Arena; Attendance: 22,600; Referee: Ricardo Salazar

September 3, 2016 MLS 28	New England Revolution	2–0	Colorado Rapids	Foxborough, Massachusetts
19:30 EDT	Agudelo 12'; Tierney 49'	http://matchcenter.mlssoccer.com/matchcenter/2016-09-03-new-england-revolution-vs-colorado-rapids MLS	Cronin (yellow card) 22'; Badji (yellow card) 29'; MacMath (yellow card) 32'; Burling (yellow card) 90+3'	Stadium: Gillette Stadium; Attendance: 15,046; Referee: Alan Kelly

September 10, 2016 MLS 29	New England Revolution	3–1	New York City FC	Foxborough, Massachusetts
19:30 EDT	Agudelo 21'; Nguyen 42'; Fagúndez 58'; Koffie (yellow card) 69'	http://matchcenter.mlssoccer.com/matchcenter/2016-09-10-new-england-revolution-vs-new-york-city-fc MLS	Mena (yellow card) 20'; Lampard 49'; Allen (yellow card) 72'; Mendoza (yellow card) 86'; Bravo (red card) 86'	Stadium: Gillette Stadium; Attendance: 23,235; Referee: Juan Guzman

September 17, 2016 MLS 30	Montreal Impact	1–3	New England Revolution	Montreal, Quebec
19:30 EDT	Shipp (yellow card) 41'; Drogba 50' (pen.); Cabera (yellow card) 54'	http://matchcenter.mlssoccer.com/matchcenter/2016-09-17-montreal-impact-vs-new-england-revolution MLS	Kamara 1'; Rowe 27', 59'; Gonçalves (yellow card) 39'; Agudelo (yellow card) 72'	Stadium: Saputo Stadium; Attendance: 20,801; Referee: Allen Chapman

September 25, 2016 MLS 31	Columbus Crew SC	2–0	New England Revolution	Columbus, Ohio
19:00 EDT	Parkhurst (yellow card) 36'; Kamara 42', 84' (pen.); Tchani (yellow card) 48'; Sauro (yellow card) 64'	http://matchcenter.mlssoccer.com/matchcenter/2016-09-25-columbus-crew-sc-vs-new-england-revolution MLS	Woodberry (yellow card) 83'; Caldwell (yellow card) 90'	Stadium: MAPFRE Stadium; Attendance: 20,012; Referee: Chris Penso

October 1, 2016 MLS 32	New England Revolution	3–1	Sporting Kansas City	Foxborough, Massachusetts
19:30 EDT	Kamara 4'; Ellis 75' (o.g.); Agudelo 83'	http://matchcenter.mlssoccer.com/matchcenter/2016-10-01-new-england-revolution-vs-sporting-kansas-city MLS	Opara (yellow card) 17'; Dwyer 49'; Medranda (yellow card) 85'	Stadium: Gillette Stadium; Attendance: 25,280; Referee: Alan Kelly

October 16, 2016 MLS 33	Chicago Fire	2-1	New England Revolution	Bridgeview, Illinois
17:00 EDT	de Leeuw 9'; Thiam (yellow card) 44'; Solignac (red card) 54'; Accam 80'; Polster (yellow card) 90+2'	http://matchcenter.mlssoccer.com/matchcenter/2016-10-16-chicago-fire-vs-new-england-revolution MLS	Kamara (yellow card) 29'; Fagundez 43'; Woodberry (yellow card) 51'; Knighton (red card) 73'	Stadium: Toyota Park; Attendance: 18,976; Referee: Baldomero Toledo

October 23, 2016 MLS 34	New England Revolution	3-0	Montreal Impact	Foxborough, Massachusetts
16:00 EDT	Fagundez 13'; Agudelo (yellow card) 56' (goal) 60'; Kamara 71' (yellow card) 72'	http://matchcenter.mlssoccer.com/matchcenter/2016-10-23-new-england-revolution-vs-montreal-impact MLS	Mallace (yellow card) 55'; Oduro (yellow card) 64'; Venegas (yellow card) 83'	Stadium: Gillette Stadium; Attendance: 39,587; Referee: Hilario Grajeda

=== U.S. Open Cup ===
June 15, 2016 Fourth round	Carolina RailHawks	0–1 (a.e.t.)	New England Revolution	Cary, North Carolina
19:30 EDT	Marcelin (yellow card) 45'; Beckie (yellow card) 54'; Shriver (yellow card) 120'	Report	Woodberry (yellow card) 56'; Kamara (yellow card) 85'; Herivaux 103'	Stadium: WakeMed Soccer Park; Attendance: 4,147; Referee: Kevin Terry Jr.

June 29, 2016 Round of 16	New York Cosmos	2–3	New England Revolution	New York, New York
19:30 EDT	Bover 38'; Ayoze (yellow card) 41'; Guenzatti 58'	Report	Fagúndez (yellow card) 22'; Bunbury 43', 83'; Kamara 75'	Stadium: Belson Stadium; Attendance: 1,264; Referee: Sorin Stoica

July 20, 2016 Quarterfinals	New England Revolution	1–1 (a.e.t.) (4–2 p)	Philadelphia Union	Boston, Massachusetts
19:30 EDT	Samba (yellow card) 13'; Watson 44', (yellow card) 109'	Report	Creavalle (yellow card) 28'; Herbers 90'	Stadium: Jordan Field; Attendance: 4,000; Referee: Sorin Stoica
	Penalties
	Nguyen (penalty scored); Tierney (penalty scored); Caldwell (penalty missed); Gonçalves (penalty scored); Watson (penalty scored)		(penalty missed) Le Toux; (penalty scored) Ilsinho; (penalty missed) Sapong; (penalty scored) Herbers

August 9, 2016 Semifinals	New England Revolution	3–1	Chicago Fire	Foxborough, Massachusetts
19:30 EDT	Kamara 16' (pen.); Watson 42', (yellow card) 51'; Bunbury 85'; Rowe (yellow card) 89'	Report	Accam 40', (red card) 89'; Kappelhof (yellow card) 43' de Leeuw (yellow card) 90+1'	Stadium: Gillette Stadium; Attendance: 9,801; Referee: Edvin Jurisevic

September 13, 2016 Final	FC Dallas	4–2	New England Revolution	Frisco, Texas
22:00 EDT	Urruti 15', 61'; Hedges 40'; Díaz 47' (pen.); Zimmerman (yellow card) 50'	Report	Agudelo 6', 73'; Caldwell (yellow card) 29'; Woodberry (yellow card) 48'; Farrell (yellow card) 63'; Fagúndez (yellow card) 66'	Stadium: Toyota Stadium; Attendance: 16,612; Referee: Baldomero Toledo

== Tables ==
=== Eastern Conference ===
Pos	Team	Pld	W	L	T	GF	GA	GD	Pts	Qualification
5	Montreal Impact	34	11	11	12	49	53	−4	45	MLS Cup Knockout Round
6	Philadelphia Union	34	11	14	9	52	55	−3	42	MLS Cup Knockout Round
7	New England Revolution	34	11	14	9	44	54	−10	42	
8	Orlando City SC	34	9	11	14	55	60	−5	41	
9	Columbus Crew SC	34	8	14	12	50	58	−8	36	

Source: MLS

=== Overall table ===
Pos	Team	Pld	W	L	T	GF	GA	GD	Pts
12	Portland Timbers	34	12	14	8	48	53	−5	44
13	Philadelphia Union	34	11	14	9	52	55	−3	42
14	New England Revolution	34	11	14	9	44	54	−10	42
15	Orlando City SC	34	9	11	14	55	60	−5	41
16	Vancouver Whitecaps FC	34	10	15	9	45	52	−7	39

Source: MLS
Rules for classification: 1) points; 2) total wins; 3) total goal differential; 4) total goals scored;

== See also ==
- 2016 Major League Soccer season
- 2016 in American soccer
