= Luis Caicedo (footballer, born 1996) =

Colombian footballer (born 1996)

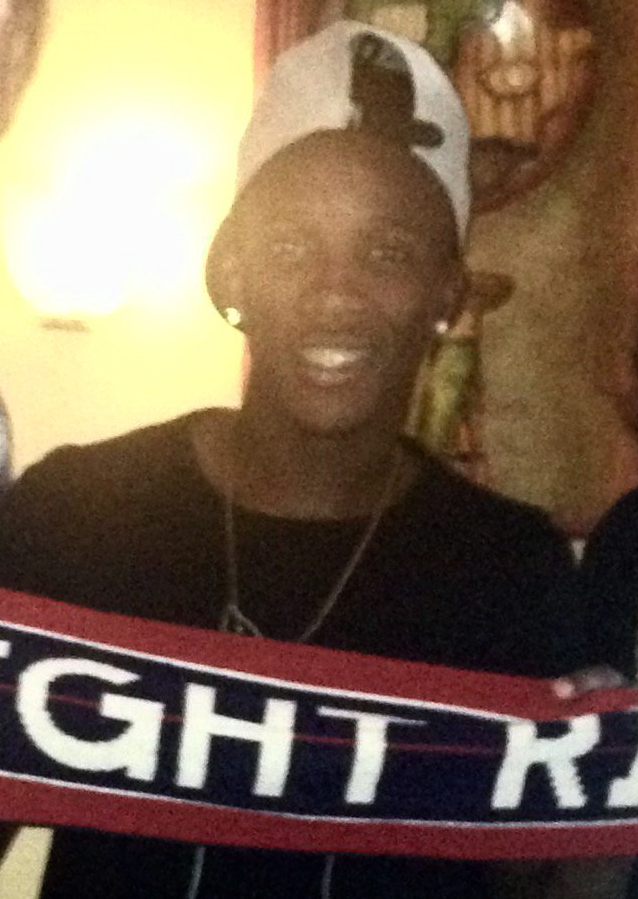

Personal information
- Full name: Luis Alberto Caicedo Mosquera
- Date of birth: May 18, 1996 (age 30)
- Place of birth: Apartadó, Colombia
- Height: 1.72 m (5 ft 7 1/2 in)
- Position: Defensive midfielder

Team information
- Current team: Houston Dynamo
- Number: 27

Youth career
- 2014–2015: Sporting CP

Senior career*
| Years | Team | Apps | (Gls) |
| 2015 | Sporting CP B | 1 | (0) |
| 2015–2018 | Cortuluá | 70 | (2) |
| 2018 | → New England Revolution (loan) | 30 | (1) |
| 2019–2021 | New England Revolution | 35 | (0) |
| 2021 | New England Revolution II | 2 | (0) |
| 2021–2022 | Cortuluá | 37 | (0) |
| 2023– | Houston Dynamo | 25 | (0) |
- * Club domestic league appearances and goals as of 31 March 2023

Luis Alberto Caicedo Mosquera (born 18 May 1996) is a Colombian football midfielder currently playing for the Houston Dynamo in Major League Soccer.

== Club career ==
=== Cortuluá Football Club ===
Caicedo joined Categoría Primera A side Cortuluá ahead of their 2015 season after spending one season with Sporting CP, where he made a single appearance for Sporting CP B. He made his debut for Cortuluá on 21 November 2015, coming off the bench in a 1–0 loss to La Equidad.

Caicedo scored his first professional goal in a 1–1 draw vs Jaguares de Córdoba on 20 August 2016. Caicedo established himself in the first team during the 2016 season, appearing in 35 Categoría Primera A matches, helping Cortuluá to an 11th-place finish in the aggregate table. He made an additional 2 appearances in the Copa Colombia.

On 22 July 2017 Caicedo scored and had an assist to give El Equipo Corazón a 2–1 win over Deportivo Cali. He finished the season with 32 total appearances as Cortuluá finished 19th in the aggregate table. They were relegated due to finishing 19th in the relegation table.

Caicedo made 3 appearances with Cortuluá in Categoría Primera B prior to going on loan.

=== New England Revolution ===
On 8 March 2018, Caicedo was loaned to the New England Revolution of Major League Soccer. He made his Revolution debut on 24 March, coming on as a substitute in a 2–2 draw against New York CIty FC. The following week Caicedo made his first start and picked up his first assist for the Revs, helping New England beat the Houston Dynamo 2–0. On 14 July he scored his first goal for the Revolution in a 3–2 loss to the LA Galaxy. Caicedo ended the season with 1 goal and 4 assists in 30 appearances as the Revs finished 8th in the Eastern Conference, failing to qualify for the playoffs. On 2 November Caicedo's move to New England was made permanent.

Caicedo was a key player for the Revolution in 2021, appearing in 31 of the 34 regular season matches and playing 2,359 minutes, the 4th most on the team, helping the Revs finish 7th in the East and qualify for the playoffs. He did not appear in New England's 1 playoff game, a 1–0 loss to Atlanta United.

During the 2020 preseason, Caicedo had issues with his knee. He underwent surgery on his right knee meniscus on 11 March and missed the entire 2020 season.

On 17 April 2021 Caicedo made a rehab appearance with Revolution II, but then missed an additional 5 months. He made a second rehab appearance on 17 September before returning to the first team on 22 September, playing 90 minutes in a 3–2 win over the Chicago Fire. He made 4 first team appearances in 2021 as the Revs finished top of the Eastern Conference and won the Supporters' shield with an MLS record 73 points. Caicedo did not appear in New England's only playoff game, with the Revolution falling 5–3 on penalties to NYCFC in the conference semifinals.

His contract expired following the 2021 season.

=== Return to Cortuluá ===
In January 2022, Caicedo returned to Cortuluá. He made his second debut for Cortuluá on 26 January, playing the full 90 minutes in a 2–1 loss to Jaguares de Córdoba. On 10 March 2022 Caicedo played in the Final of the 2021 Categoría Primera B Torneo II, losing on penalties to Unión Magdalena. Caicedo played in 36 of a possible 40 Primera A matches as Cortuluá finished 20th in the aggregate table. Cortuluá were relegated due to having the worst average points over the previous three seasons.

=== Houston Dynamo ===
On 23 February 2023, Caicedo returned to MLS and signed with the Houston Dynamo on a one-year deal, with team options for 2024 and 2025. He made his Dynamo debut on 4 March, coming off the bench in a 3–0 to New England.

== Career statistics ==
=== Club ===
As of match played 31 March 2023

Appearances and goals by club, season and competition
| Club | Season | League | | | National Cup (Note: Includes Copa Colombia and U.S. Open Cup) | | Playoffs | | Continental | | Total | |
| Club | Season | Division | Apps | Goals | Apps | Goals | Apps | Goals | Apps | Goals | Apps | Goals |
|---|---|---|---|---|---|---|---|---|---|---|---|---|
| Sporting CP B | 2014–15 | Segunda Liga | 1 | 0 | — | | — | | — | | 1 | 0 |
| Cortuluá | 2015 | Primera A | 1 | 0 | 0 | 0 | — | | — | | 1 | 0 |
| Cortuluá | 2016 | Primera A | 35 | 1 | 2 | 0 | — | | — | | 37 | 1 |
| Cortuluá | 2017 | Primera A | 31 | 1 | 1 | 0 | — | | — | | 32 | 1 |
| Cortuluá | 2018 | Primera B | 3 | 0 | 0 | 0 | — | | — | | 3 | 0 |
| Cortuluá | Total | | 70 | 2 | 3 | 0 | 0 | 0 | 0 | 0 | 73 | 2 |
| New England Revolution (loan) | 2018 | MLS | 30 | 1 | 0 | 0 | — | | — | | 30 | 1 |
| New England Revolution | 2019 | MLS | 31 | 0 | 1 | 0 | 0 | 0 | — | | 32 | 0 |
| New England Revolution | 2020 | MLS | 0 | 0 | — | | 0 | 0 | — | | 0 | 0 |
| New England Revolution | 2021 | MLS | 4 | 0 | — | | — | | — | | 4 | 0 |
| New England Revolution | Total | | 65 | 1 | 1 | 0 | 0 | 0 | 0 | 0 | 66 | 1 |
| New England Revolution II | 2021 | USL1 | 2 | 0 | — | | — | | — | | 2 | 0 |
| Cortuluá | 2021 | Primera B | 1 | 0 | 0 | 0 | — | | — | | 1 | 0 |
| Cortuluá | 2022 | Primera A | 36 | 0 | 0 | 0 | — | | — | | 36 | 0 |
| Cortuluá | Total | | 37 | 0 | 0 | 0 | 0 | 0 | 0 | 0 | 37 | 0 |
| Houston Dynamo | 2023 | MLS | 3 | 0 | 0 | 0 | 0 | 0 | 0 | 0 | 3 | 0 |
| Career total | | | 178 | 3 | 4 | 0 | 0 | 0 | 0 | 0 | 182 | 3 |

== Honours ==
=== Club ===
New England Revolution

- Supporters' Shield: 2021

== Personal life ==
In March 2021 Caicedo obtained a green card, qualifying him as a domestic player for Major League Soccer roster purposes.
