= 2020 New England Revolution season =

New England Revolution
2020 season
- Owner: Robert Kraft; Jonathan Kraft (Kraft Group)
- President: Brian Bilello
- Head coach: Bruce Arena
- Stadium: Gillette Stadium; Foxborough, Massachusetts
- MLS: Conference: 8th Overall: 15th
- MLS Cup Playoffs: Conf. Final
- U.S. Open Cup: Canceled
- MLS is Back Tournament: Round of 16
- Biggest win: NE 3–1 MTL (Sept. 23); DC 0–2 NE (Sept. 27); PHI 0–2 NE (Nov. 24); ORL 1–3 NE (Nov. 29)
- Biggest defeat: NE 0–2 NYC (Sept. 2); PHI 2–0 NE (Nov. 8)
Home colors	Away colors

The 2020 New England Revolution season was the team's 25th season of existence, and their 25th season in Major League Soccer, the top-flight of American soccer.

== Season Review ==
On March 12 it was announced that the 2020 Major League Soccer season had been temporarily suspended for 30 days due to the COVID-19 pandemic. On April 17 the MLS announced that the suspension was extended until at least June 8. On May 6, MLS allowed voluntary individual workouts on outdoor fields for the first time since the suspension.

== Current squad ==
As of November 29, 2020

No.	Nationality	Name	Position(s)	Date of birth (age)	Previous club	Notes
Goalkeepers
18	(United States)	Brad Knighton	GK	February 6, 1985 (age 41)	(Canada) Vancouver Whitecaps FC	–
25	(United States)	Jeff Caldwell	GK	February 20, 1996 (age 30)	(United States) New York City FC	–
30	(United States)	Matt Turner	GK	June 24, 1994 (age 31)	(United States) Fairfield Stags	–
Defenders
2	(United States)	Andrew Farrell	CB	April 2, 1992 (age 33)	(United States) Louisville Cardinals	–
4	(United States)	Henry Kessler	CB	June 25, 1995 (age 30)	(United States) Virginia Cavaliers	GA
13	(England)	Michael Mancienne	DF	January 8, 1988 (age 38)	(England) Nottingham Forest	INT
15	(United States)	Brandon Bye	LB/RB	November 29, 1995 (age 30)	(United States) Minneapolis City	–
16	(United States)	Seth Sinovic	LB	January 28, 1987 (age 39)	(United States) Sporting KC	–
19	(Slovenia)	Antonio Delamea Mlinar	CB	June 10, 1991 (age 34)	(Slovenia) Olimpija Ljubljana	–
24	(United States)	DeJuan Jones	RB	June 24, 1997 (age 28)	(United States) Michigan State Spartans	–
28	(Netherlands)	Alexander Büttner	LB	February 11, 1989 (age 37)	(Netherlands) Vitesse	INT
35	(United States)	Collin Verfurth	DF	March 8, 1996 (age 29)	(United States) Loudoun United	–
Midfielders
5	(United States)	Isaac Angking	MF	January 24, 2000 (age 26)	–	HG
6	(United States)	Scott Caldwell	MF	March 15, 1991 (age 34)	(United States) Akron Zips	HG
8	(United States)	Matt Polster	MF	June 8, 1993 (age 32)	(Scotland) Rangers F.C.	–
11	(United States)	Kelyn Rowe	MF	December 2, 1991 (age 34)	(United States) Real Salt Lake	–
14	(Uruguay)	Diego Fagúndez	CAM	February 14, 1995 (age 31)	–	HG
22	(Spain)	Carles Gil	CAM	November 22, 1992 (age 33)	(Spain) Deportivo de La Coruña	DP
26	(United States)	Tommy McNamara	MF	February 6, 1991 (age 35)	(United States) Houston Dynamo FC	–
27	(Colombia)	Luis Caicedo	DM	May 18, 1996 (age 29)	(Colombia) Cortuluá	INT
29	(Brazil)	Nicolas Firmino	MF	January 30, 2001 (age 25)	–	HG
31	(The Gambia)	Kekuta Manneh	LW/RW	December 3, 1994 (age 31)	(United States) FC Cincinnati	–
42	(United States)	Lee Nguyen	MF	October 7, 1986 (age 39)	(United States) Inter Miami CF	–
72	(United States)	Damian Rivera	MF	December 8, 2002 (age 23)	–	HG
Forwards
7	(Argentina)	Gustavo Bou	FW	February 18, 1990 (age 36)	(Mexico) Tijuana	DP
9	(Poland)	Adam Buksa	CF	July 12, 1996 (age 29)	(Poland) Pogoń Szczecin	DP
10	(United States)	Teal Bunbury	FW	February 27, 1990 (age 36)	(United States) Sporting KC	–
12	(United States)	Justin Rennicks	FW	March 20, 1999 (age 26)	(United States) Indiana Hoosiers	HG
17	(Canada)	Tajon Buchanan	FW	February 8, 1999 (age 27)	(United States) Syracuse Orange	GA
70	(Ecuador)	Cristian Penilla	FW	May 2, 1991 (age 34)	(Mexico) Pachuca	INT

== Competitions ==
=== Exhibitions ===
February 10 Preseason 1	LA Galaxy	2–1	New England Revolution	Carson, California
14:00 EST	Zubak 8'; Pavón 34'	Report	Bou 42'	Stadium: Dignity Health Sports Park

February 12 Preseason 2	New England Revolution	3–1	Colorado Rapids	Carson, California
14:00 EST	Rivera 7', 19'; Buchanan 53'	Report; Report	Lewis 57'	Stadium: Dignity Health Sports Park

February 16 Preseason 3	New England Revolution	2–2	Minnesota United FC	Portland, Oregon
17:30 EST	Buksa 28' (Penilla); Bou 71'	Report	Amarilla 23' (Molino), 35' (pen.)	Stadium: Providence Park

February 19 Preseason 4	New England Revolution	0–2	Vancouver Whitecaps FC	Portland, Oregon
20:00 EST	Buchanan (yellow card) 39'	Report	Dájome (yellow card) 36'; Adnan (yellow card) 64' (goal) 71'; Cavallini 68'; David Milinković (yellow card) 69'	Stadium: Providence Park; Referee: Ramy Touchan

February 22 Preseason 5	Portland Timbers	1–3	New England Revolution	Portland, Oregon
20:00 EST	Chará 29'	Report	Bye (yellow card) 25'; Bou 42', 45+3' (pen.); Buksa 51'; Kessler (yellow card) 75'	Stadium: Providence Park; Referee: Lukasz Szpala

=== MLS ===
==== League tables ====
===== Eastern Conference =====
Pos	Team	Pld	W	L	T	GF	GA	GD	Pts	PPG	Qualification
6	New York Red Bulls	23	9	9	5	29	31	−2	32	1.39	MLS Cup First Round
7	Nashville SC (Note: On June 10, 2020, Major League Soccer announced that Nashville SC would switch from the Western Conference to the Eastern Conference for the remainder of the 2020 season.)	23	8	7	8	24	22	+2	32	1.39	MLS Cup Play-in Round
8	New England Revolution	23	8	7	8	26	25	+1	32	1.39	MLS Cup Play-in Round
9	Montreal Impact	23	8	13	2	33	43	−10	26	1.13	MLS Cup Play-in Round
10	Inter Miami CF	23	7	13	3	25	35	−10	24	1.04	MLS Cup Play-in Round

Source: MLS
Rules for classification: 1) points per game; 2) total wins per match played; 3) total goal differential per match played; 4) total goals scored per match played; 5) fewest disciplinary points per match played; 6) away goal differential per away match played; 7) away goals scored per away match played; 8) home goal differential per home match played; 9) home goals scored per home match played; 10) coin toss or drawing of lots.

===== MLS is Back – Group C =====
Group C results
Pos	Team	Pld	W	D	L	GF	GA	GD	Pts	Qualification
1	Toronto FC	3	1	2	0	6	5	+1	5	Advanced to knockout stage
2	New England Revolution	3	1	2	0	2	1	+1	5	Advanced to knockout stage
3	Montreal Impact	3	1	0	2	4	5	−1	3	Advanced to knockout stage
4	D.C. United	3	0	2	1	3	4	−1	2	

Source: MLS

===== Overall =====
2020 MLS overall standings
Pos	Team	Pld	W	L	T	GF	GA	GD	Pts	PPG
13	New York Red Bulls	23	9	9	5	29	31	−2	32	1.39
14	Nashville SC	23	8	7	8	24	22	+2	32	1.39
15	New England Revolution	23	8	7	8	26	25	+1	32	1.39
16	San Jose Earthquakes	23	8	9	6	35	51	−16	30	1.30
17	Vancouver Whitecaps FC	23	9	14	0	27	44	−17	27	1.17

Source: MLS
Rules for classification: 1) points per game; 2) total wins per match played; 3) total goal differential per match played; 4) total goals scored per match played; 5) fewest disciplinary points per match played; 6) away goal differential per away match played; 7) away goals scored per away match played; 8) home goal differential per home match played; 9) home goals scored per home match played; 10) coin toss or drawing of lots.

==== Match results ====
Only matches numbered in the left column apply to the season standings

February 29 1	Montreal Impact	2–1	New England Revolution	Montreal, Quebec
13:00 EST	Quioto 37'; Urruti 80'	Report	Bunbury 13'	Stadium: Stade Saputo; Attendance: 21,006; Referee: Chris Penso

March 7 2	New England Revolution	1–1	Chicago Fire	Foxborough, Massachusetts
13:30 EST	Buksa 28'; Kessler (yellow card) 40'; Jones (yellow card) 90+1'	Report	Kappelhof (yellow card) 47'; Bornstein 70'	Stadium: Gillette Stadium; Attendance: 15,289; Referee: Fotis Bazakos

July 9 3 MLSiBT Group Stage	Montreal Impact	0–1	New England Revolution	Bay Lake, Florida
20:00 EDT	Binks (yellow card) 72'	Report	Bou 56'; Mancienne (yellow card) 61'	Stadium: ESPN Wide World of Sports Complex; Attendance: 0 Referee: Guido Gonzalez

July 17 4 MLSiBT Group Stage	D.C. United	1–1	New England Revolution	Bay Lake, Florida
18:00 EDT	Gressel (yellow card) 16'; Asad (yellow card) 45+1'; Higuaín 72'; Brillant (yellow card) 83'	Report	Buksa 51'	Stadium: ESPN Wide World of Sports Complex; Referee: Joseph Dickerson
Note: Match postponed due to the COVID-19 pandemic

July 21 5 MLSiBT Group Stage	Toronto FC	0–0	New England Revolution	Bay Lake, Florida
9:00 EDT	Bradley (yellow card) 50'	Report	Rowe (yellow card) 38'; Caldwell (yellow card) 41'	Stadium: ESPN Wide World of Sports Complex; Referee: Jair Marrufo
Note: Match postponed due to the COVID-19 pandemic

July 25 MLSiBT Round of 16	Philadelphia Union	1–0	New England Revolution	Bay Lake, Florida
10:30 p.m. EDT	Santos 63'			Stadium: ESPN Wide World of Sports Complex; Referee: Ismail Elfath

August 20 6	New England Revolution	0–0	Philadelphia Union	Foxborough, Massachusetts
19:30 EDT	Bye (yellow card) 25'; Polster (yellow card) 44'	Report	McKenzie (yellow card) 50'; Elliott (yellow card) 53'	Stadium: Gillette Stadium; Referee: Robert Sibiga

August 25 7	D.C. United	1–2	New England Revolution	Washington, D.C.
20:00 EDT	Birnbaum (yellow card) 66'; Kamara 72' (pen.); Felipe (yellow card) 90+10'	Report	Bou 26'; Bunbury 38'; Caldwell (yellow card) 83'; Buksa (yellow card) 90+5'	Stadium: Audi Field; Referee: Guido Gonzales Jr.

August 29 8	New England Revolution	1–1	New York Red Bulls	Foxborough, Massachusetts
20:00 EDT	Bou 41'	Report	Fernandez 35'; Parker (red card) 90+2'	Stadium: Gillette Stadium; Referee: Jair Marrufo

September 2 9	New England Revolution	0–2	New York City FC	Foxborough, Massachusetts
20:00 EDT	Bunbury (yellow card) 40'; Rowe (yellow card) 76'	Report	Parks (yellow card) 33'; Mancienne 60' (o.g.); Héber 72'; Callens (yellow card) 83'	Stadium: Gillette Stadium; Referee: Armando Villarreal

September 6 10	Chicago Fire FC	1–2	New England Revolution	Chicago, Illinois
19:00 EDT	Herbers 22'	Report	Bunbury 3', 54'; Fagúndez (yellow card) 35'	Stadium: Soldier Field; Referee: Robert Sibiga

September 12 11	Philadelphia Union	2–1	New England Revolution	Chester, Pennsylvania
7:30 PM EDT	Fontana (yellow card) 65', (goal) 73', 90+5'; Martínez (yellow card) 20'; Gaddis (yellow card) 36'; Bedoya (yellow card) 50'; McKenzie (yellow card) 90'	Report	Polster (yellow card) 8' (yellow-red card) 56'; Buchanan 81'	Stadium: Subaru Park; Referee: Guido Gonzales, Jr.

September 19 12	New England Revolution	0–0	New York City FC	Foxborough, Massachusetts
4:30 PM EDT		Report	Ring (yellow card) 22'; Scally (yellow card) 47'; Parks (yellow card) 54'; Thórarinsson (yellow card) 64'; Callens (yellow card) 67'; Castellanos (yellow card) 80'	Stadium: Gillette Stadium; Referee: Ramy Touchan

September 23 13	New England Revolution	3–1	Montreal Impact	Foxborough, Massachusetts
7:30 PM EDT	Farrell (yellow card) 41'; Kessler 45+2'; Bou 49'; Fagúndez 65'	Report	Binks (yellow card) 53'; Lappalainen 86'	Stadium: Gillette Stadium; Referee: Fotis Bazakos

September 27 14	DC United	0–2	New England Revolution	Washington, D.C.
7:00 PM EDT	Brillant (yellow card) 45+5'; Mora (yellow card) 50'; Moreno (yellow card) 81'	Report	Bou 86'; Buksa 90', (yellow card) 90+1'	Stadium: Audi Field; Referee: Alex Chilowicz

October 3 15	New England Revolution	0–0	Nashville SC	Foxborough, Massachusetts
7:30 PM EDT		Report	Anibaba (yellow card) 80'	Stadium: Gillette Stadium; Referee: David Gantar

October 7 16	New England Revolution	0–1	Toronto FC	Foxborough, Massachusetts
7:30 PM EDT	McNamara (yellow card) 40'; Kessler (yellow card) 48'; Bye (yellow card) 63'; Buksa (penalty missed) 68'; Bunbury (yellow card) 90+3'	Report	Akinola 29'; Auro (yellow card) 71'; Laryea (yellow card) 84'	Stadium: Gillette Stadium; Referee: Nima Saghafi

October 11 17	New York City FC	1–2	New England Revolution	New York, New York
4:30 PM EDT	Callens 90+3'	Report	Bunbury 3'; Nguyen (yellow card) 45', (goal) 80' (pen.); Caldwell (yellow card) 58'; Rowe (yellow card) 76'; Jones (yellow card) 83'	Stadium: Yankee Stadium; Referee: Armando Villarreal

October 14 18	Montreal Impact	2–3	New England Revolution	Harrison, New Jersey
7:30 PM	Sejdič 27'; Binks (yellow card) 83'; Tabla 90+2'	Report	Manneh 13'; Bunbury 20'; Buksa 52', (yellow card) 57'; McNamara (yellow card) 87'	Stadium: Red Bull Arena; Referee: Joseph Dickerson

October 19 19	New England Revolution	1–2	Philadelphia Union	Foxborough, Massachusetts
7:30 PM EDT	Buchanan 80'; Polster (yellow card) 90+2'	Report	Farrell 34' (o.g.); Santos (yellow card) 57'; Fontana 69'; Monteiro (yellow card) 87'	Stadium: Gillette Stadium; Referee: Rubiel Vazquez

October 23 20	Nashville SC	1–1	New England Revolution	Nashville, Tennessee
9:52 PM EDT	McCarty (yellow card) 62'; Anunga (yellow card) 66'; Zimmerman 74'	Report	Buksa 77'; Manneh (yellow card) 89'	Stadium: Nissan Stadium; Attendance: 3,727; Referee: Robert Sibiga
Note: Kickoff delayed from 8:30 to 9:52 by lightning in area.

October 28 21	New York Red Bulls	1–0	New England Revolution	Harrison, New Jersey
7:00 PM EDT	Long 89'	Report	Caldwell (yellow card) 43'; Buksa (yellow card) 48'; Fagúndez (yellow card) 57'; Buchanan (yellow card) 75'; Nguyen (yellow card) 85'	Stadium: Red Bull Arena; Referee: Alan Kelly

November 1 22	New England Revolution	4–3	D.C. United	Foxborough, Massachusetts
7:30 PM EST	Buksa 30'; Canouse 54' (o.g.); Bunbury 67', 84'	Report	Asad (yellow card) 14', (goal) 22'; Yow 26'; Canouse (yellow card) 29'; Rivas 75'	Stadium: Gillette Stadium; Referee: David Gantar

November 8 23	Philadelphia Union	2–0	New England Revolution	Chester, Pennsylvania
3:30 PM EST	Santos 42'; Burke 69'; Martínez (yellow card) 86'	Report	Farrell (yellow card) 31'; Bunbury (yellow card) 55'; Caldwell (yellow card) 90+6'	Stadium: Subaru Park; Attendance: 2,775; Referee: Drew Fischer

==== MLS Cup Playoffs ====
November 20 Play-in Round	New England Revolution	2–1	Montreal Impact	Foxborough, Massachusetts
6:30 PM EST	Bou (yellow card) 6', (goal) 90+5'; McNamara (yellow card) 20'; Gil 38'	Report	Corrales (yellow card) 43'; Quioto 61'	Stadium: Gillette Stadium; Attendance: 0 Referee: Jair Marrufo

November 24 First round	Philadelphia Union	0–2	New England Revolution	Chester, Pennsylvania
8:00 PM EST	Przybyłko (yellow card) 36'; Wagner (yellow card) 73'	Report	Buksa 26'; Buchanan 30'; Polster (yellow card) 88'	Stadium: Subaru Park; Attendance: 0 Referee: Joseph Dickerson

November 29 Conf. Semifinal	Orlando City SC	1–3	New England Revolution	Orlando, Florida
3:00 PM EST	Urso 33', (yellow card) 75'; Carlos (yellow card) 47'; Dike (yellow card) 53'; Pereyra (red card) 60'; Nani (yellow card) 62', (penalty missed) 74'	Report	Gil 17'; Bou 25', 86'; Buksa (yellow card) 28'	Stadium: Exploria Stadium; Attendance: Not reported Referee: Alex Chilowicz

December 6 Conf. Final	Columbus Crew SC	1–0	New England Revolution	Columbus, Ohio
4:00 PM EST	Artur 59'; Pedro Santos (yellow card) 90+3'	Report		Stadium: Mapfre Stadium; Attendance: 1,500; Referee: Armando Villarreal

=== U.S. Open Cup ===
Due to their final standings for the 2019 season, the Revolution were scheduled to enter the competition in the Fourth Round, to be played May 19–20. The ongoing coronavirus pandemic, however, forced the U.S. Soccer Federation to cancel the tournament on August 17, 2020.
