= Cristian Penilla =

Ecuadorian football midfielder (born 1991)

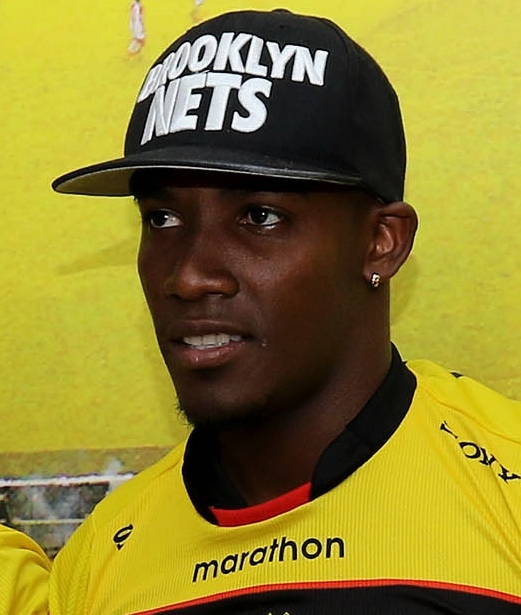

Personal information
- Full name: Cristian Anderson Penilla Caicedo
- Date of birth: May 2, 1991 (age 35)
- Place of birth: Esmeraldas, Ecuador
- Height: 1.75 m (5 ft 9 in)
- Position: Winger

Team information
- Current team: Mushuc Runa
- Number: 17

Youth career
- ESPOLI

Senior career*
Years	Team	Apps	(Gls)
2010–2011	ESPOLI	60	(8)
2012	Deportivo Quito	12	(1)
2013–2014	Barcelona SC	65	(12)
2015–2018	Pachuca	28	(4)
2016	→ Barcelona SC (loan)	14	(7)
2016–2017	→ Morelia (loan)	18	(0)
2017	→ Chapecoense (loan)	11	(0)
2018	→ New England Revolution (loan)	33	(12)
2019–2020	New England Revolution	47	(6)
2021–2022	Club Deportivo Cuenca	14	(1)
2022	→ Barcelona SC (loan)	25	(2)
2023	Delfín SC	18	(1)
2024	Libertad	5	(3)

International career^{‡}
2014	Ecuador	2	(1)
- * Club domestic league appearances and goals as of 12 November 2020 ‡ National team caps and goals as of 14 October 2014

Cristian Anderson Penilla Caicedo (born 2 May 1991) is an Ecuadorian football winger who plays for Serie A side, Mushuc Runa S.C..

== Club career ==
Penilla joined Barcelona in January 2013 from Deportivo Quito, one year after he left ESPOLI for Deportivo Quito. In his first season with Barcelona he scored six goals out of 32 league games. On December 24, 2014, it was confirmed that Penilla would join Pachuca.

=== New England Revolution ===
On January 23, 2018, Penilla was loaned to the New England Revolution of Major League Soccer. He made his Revolution debut (and first start) on March 3, in the 2018 New England Revolution season opener, a 2–0 loss to the Philadelphia Union. He made his home debut and notched his first Revolution assist the following week in a 2–1 win over the Colorado Rapids, setting up Diego Fagundez's 48th-minute goal.

He scored his first goal for the Revolution on March 31 in a 2–0 win over the Houston Dynamo. Penilla recorded the fastest brace in club history on May 12, scoring in the 4th and 7th minutes of the club's 3–2 victory over Toronto FC.

Penilla led the Revolution in appearances (33), starts (33), and goals (12) during the 2018 season, additionally notching 7 assists. He was named to the MLS Team of the Week five times during the season. Penilla was named Midnight Riders Man of the Year, Revolution Player's Player of the Year, and Revolution team MVP, winning the club's golden boot. New England made his move permanent at the end of their 2018 season.

In the 2019 New England Revolution season, Penilla recorded 6 goals and 8 assists. He made his 50th MLS appearance on July 17, a match in which he notched two assists coming off the bench as a 68th-minute substitute against the Vancouver Whitecaps in a 4–0 win.

In the abbreviated 2020 New England Revolution season, Penilla made 17 appearances, recording four assists. He suffered a fracture to his left foot in the Revolution's October 11 2–1 win over New York City FC, requiring him to undergo surgery and miss the remainder of the season. The Revolution declined his contract option on December 8, 2020.

=== C.D. Cuenca ===
In June 2021, Penilla signed for Ecuadorian Serie A club C.D. Cuenca.

== International career ==
Penilla was called for Friendlies against United States and El Salvador on October 10 and 14th, 2014 respectively. Penilla made his debut for Ecuador against the United States on October 10, 2014.

=== International goals ===
Scores and results list Ecuador's goal tally first.

#	Date	Venue	Opponent	Score	Final	Competition
1	14 October 2014	Red Bull Arena, New Jersey, United States	El Salvador	5–1	5–1	International friendly

== Career statistics ==
=== Club ===
As of March 30, 2016

Club	Season	League			Cup		Continental		Total	
Club	Season	Division	Apps	Goals	Apps	Goals	Apps	Goals	Apps	Goals
ESPOLI	2010	Serie A	32	3	–		0	0	32	3
ESPOLI	2011	Serie A	29	5	–		0	0	29	5
ESPOLI	Total		61	8	–		0	0	61	8
SD Quito	2012	Serie A	12	1	–		0	0	12	1
SD Quito	Total		12	1	–		0	0	12	1
Barcelona SC	2013	Serie A	32	6	–		3	0	35	6
Barcelona SC	2014	Serie A	33	6	–		4	1	37	7
Barcelona SC	Total		65	12	–		7	1	72	13
Pachuca	2015 Clausura	Liga MX	15	3	0	0	0	0	15	3
Pachuca	2015 Apertura	Liga MX	13	1	5	0	0	0	18	1
Pachuca	Total		28	4	5	0	0	0	33	4
Barcelona SC	2016	Serie A	8	6	–		0	0	8	6
Barcelona SC	Total		8	6	–		0	0	8	6
Career total			174	31	5	0	7	1	185	32

=== National team ===
As of March 15, 2016

Ecuador national team
Year	Apps	Goals
2014	2	1
Total	2	1
