= Michael Mancienne =

Seychellois footballer (born 1988)

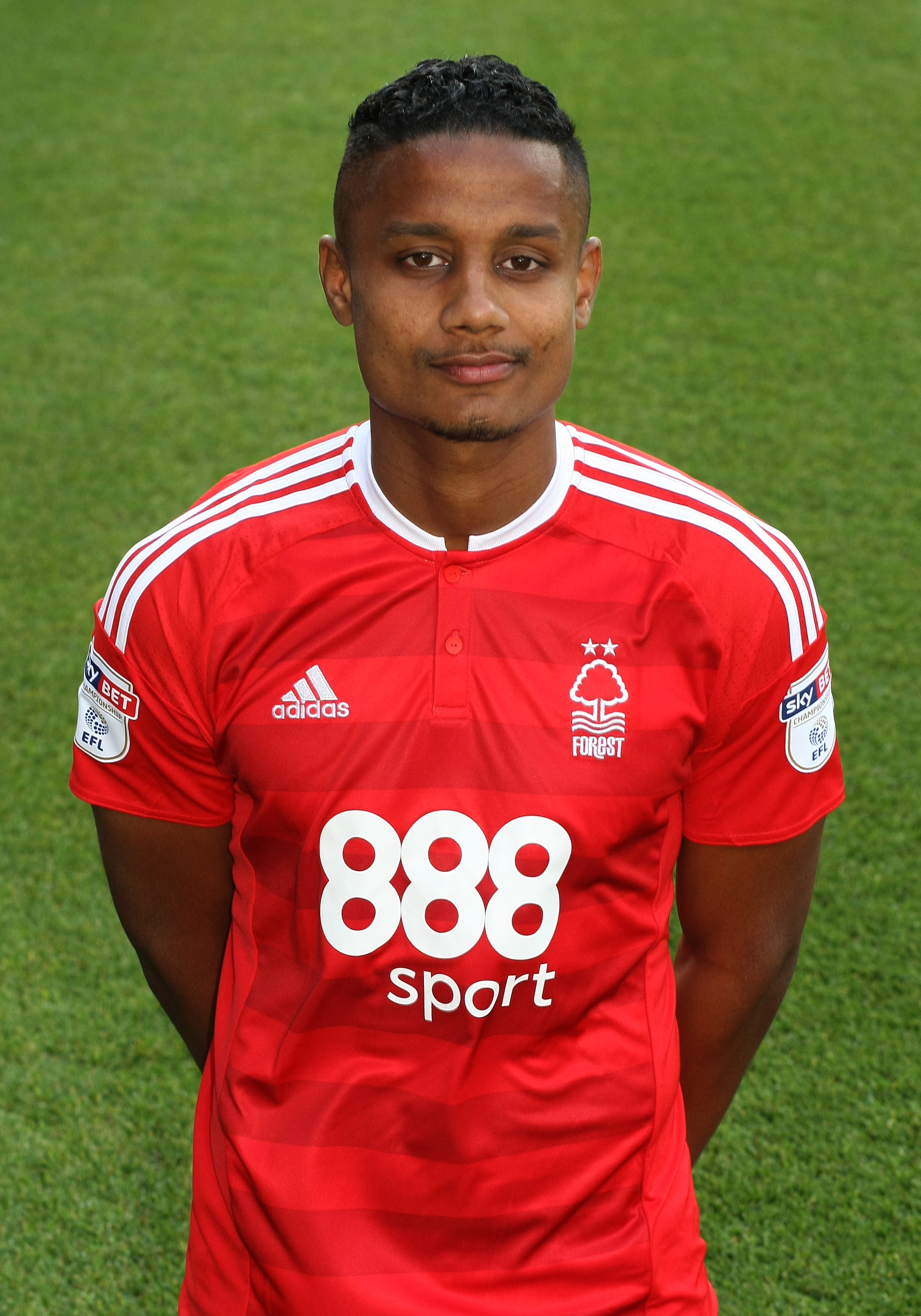
- Mancienne with Nottingham Forest in 2016

Personal information
- Full name: Michael Ian Mancienne
- Date of birth: 8 January 1988 (age 38)
- Place of birth: Feltham, England
- Height: 1.84 m (6 ft 0 in)
- Position: Defender

Youth career
- Kingstonian
- –2006: Chelsea

Senior career*
Years	Team	Apps	(Gls)
2006–2011	Chelsea	4	(0)
2006–2008	→ Queens Park Rangers (loan)	58	(0)
2008	→ Wolverhampton Wanderers (loan)	10	(0)
2009–2011	→ Wolverhampton Wanderers (loan)	46	(0)
2011–2014	Hamburger SV	49	(0)
2013	Hamburger SV II	2	(0)
2014–2018	Nottingham Forest	125	(0)
2018–2020	New England Revolution	31	(1)
2021–2023	Burton Albion	40	(0)
Total		362	(1)

International career
2003–2004	England U16	6	(3)
2004–2005	England U17	15	(0)
2005–2006	England U18	2	(0)
2006–2007	England U19	9	(0)
2007–2011	England U21	30	(1)
2022–2023	Seychelles	5	(1)
Medal record
Men's football
Representing England
UEFA European Under-21 Championship
Runner-up	2009 Sweden
- * Club domestic league appearances and goals

Michael Ian Mancienne (born 8 January 1988) is a former professional footballer who played as a defender. Born in England, he played for the Seychelles national team. He played for football clubs in Germany, the United States, and England.

Schooled primarily as a centre back, Mancienne can also play as a defensive midfielder as well as both fullback positions as he showed during appearances for Chelsea, and multiple loan spells at Wolverhampton Wanderers.

He is a former England under-21 player, having received his first call-up for the senior squad in November 2008, ahead of a friendly against Germany.

== Club career ==
=== Chelsea ===
Born in Feltham, London, Mancienne was spotted by Chelsea as a nine-year-old playing for Kingstonian, and debuted for the Chelsea Reserves while still at school. He signed a professional contract in January 2006, and was called onto the bench for the final match of the 2005–06 season but was unused.

He was part of Chelsea's pre-season tour of the United States in Summer 2006 and started the season again with a place on the bench; in the 2006 Community Shield against Liverpool and the first two Premier League games of the 2006–07 season against Manchester City and Blackburn Rovers. Despite this, it would be over two years before he would play a competitive game for the Blues, a fact that led him to admit he may need to move on for the sake of his career.

After gaining playing time with spells on loan at Championship sides Queens Park Rangers and Wolverhampton Wanderers, respectively (see below), he finally made his Chelsea debut on 14 February 2009, starting an FA Cup tie at Watford. He made his European debut appearance 11 days later as a late substitute in a UEFA Champions League knock-out tie against Juventus, which ended 1–0 to Chelsea. On 28 February he achieved his Premier League debut in a 2–1 victory over Wigan Athletic.

At the end of the 2008–09 season, during which he made his only first team appearances to date for the club, he was voted their Young Player of the Year.

He signed a new contract with Chelsea in August 2009 that would expire in June 2013.

==== Queens Park Rangers (loan) ====
Mancienne gained his first taste of league football in a loan spell at Queens Park Rangers in late 2006, when he joined them for the remainder of the 2006–07 campaign. He played most of his 28 games for the Championship side at right back, but also played a few times in his preferred centre-back position. His impressive displays made him popular with the QPR fans, who voted him runner-up in the Supporters' Young Player of the Year.

After signing a new contract extension at his parent club, he agreed to remain on loan at QPR for the 2007–08 season.

==== Wolverhampton Wanderers (loan) ====
With no playing opportunities arriving at Stamford Bridge, Mancienne again went out on loan in October 2008 when he joined promotion-chasing Championship side Wolverhampton Wanderers on loan initially until 29 December 2008. His performances during this period caused Wolves to extend his loan by a further month, however, the paperwork on the extension was never completed, and he was recalled by his parent club.

He rejoined Wolves on a season's loan for the 2009–10 season, by which time they had achieved promotion to the Premier League. He was employed at centre back and in a defensive midfield role during the campaign, helping the club to survive their first season back at the top level.

He once again returned to Molineux for the following season, his third different spell with the Midlands club during which he made his 50th appearance for them. He suffered a patella tendon injury in December that ruled him out for three months, before he returned to the side for the club's final six games, as they narrowly avoided the drop.

=== Hamburger SV ===
On 31 May 2011, Mancienne signed a four-year deal at German Bundesliga club Hamburger SV for a fee in the region of £1.752 million. He was reunited with former Chelsea sporting director Frank Arnesen, officially moving on 1 July 2011, when the transfer window opened. He made his debut for the club on 5 August 2011, in a 3–1 defeat at reigning champions Borussia Dortmund.

=== Nottingham Forest ===
On 16 July 2014, Mancienne joined Nottingham Forest on a three-year deal, reuniting with his England U21 manager Stuart Pearce. He made his debut against Blackpool on 9 August, starting at centre-half alongside Danny Fox. He played the entire ninety minutes of the 2–0 Forest win, earning the Man of the Match award in the process. Mancienne was then sent off in his second game for the club, following two bookable offences in Forest's League Cup tie away at Tranmere Rovers on 12 August. Following his suspension, he returned to the side and once again was nominated the fans' Man of the Match in a 1–0 away win at Sheffield Wednesday.

On 28 April 2017, Mancienne signed a two-year extension to his contract with Nottingham Forest, now managed by Mark Warburton. The contract was signed the day before Mancienne made his 100th appearance in all competitions for the club, in a 2–0 defeat to QPR, and the player reportedly accepted a reduced salary in order to stay at the club.

Having done so in a pre-season friendly match against Burnley, Mancienne captained Forest for the first League match of the 2017–18 season, a 1–0 win over Millwall.

=== New England Revolution ===
On 3 August 2018, Mancienne joined Major League Soccer side New England Revolution. His reported salary of $1.28 million in 2018, and $881,676 in 2019, made him not only the highest-paid defender in the league at the time, but also the highest-paid defensive player in the team's history.

Following their 2020 season, New England opted to decline their contract option on Mancienne.

=== Burton Albion ===
On 9 February 2021, Mancienne joined League One side Burton Albion on a contract until the end of the 2020–21 season.

On 9 June 2022, Mancienne signed a one-year extension to his contract with Burton Albion. Having missed the opening day of the 2022–23 season, manager Jimmy Floyd Hasselbaink confirmed that he would be out injured for three months with a knee injury.

Mancienne called an end to his career after only playing for 1 minute in the entire 2022-23 season in the league.

== International career ==
Mancienne is eligible to play for the Seychelles as his father, Michael Snr, originates from there and is a former Seychelles international midfielder. He rejected the chance to play for the Seychelles national team in 2006 in favour of his native England. However, in November 2008, he stated that he would play for Seychelles if he did not get to play for England by the time he reaches 25.

On 15 November 2008, Fabio Capello surprisingly named him in the England squad to play an international friendly match against Germany in Berlin. He did not appear in the game though.

He was an England regular at under-21 level since making his debut against Romania on 21 August 2007. He was part of the side that reached the 2009 European Championships. However, his tournament was a disappointment as he received a red card in their opening group game against Finland.

He has previously also represented England at under-16, under-17, under-19 and under-21 levels.

In 2022 he was called up to the Seychelles national team for the 2022 COSAFA Cup. He made his debut against Botswana on 5 July. He scored his first International goal from a penalty against Bangladesh in 2023.

== Career statistics ==
=== Club ===
As of match played 28 January 2021

Appearances and goals by club, season and competition
Club	Season	League			National cup		League cup		Other		Total	
Club	Season	Division	Apps	Goals	Apps	Goals	Apps	Goals	Apps	Goals	Apps	Goals
Chelsea	2005–06	Premier League	0	0	0	0	0	0	0	0	0	0
Chelsea	2006–07	Premier League	0	0	0	0	0	0	0	0	0	0
Chelsea	2008–09	Premier League	4	0	1	0	0	0	1 (Note: Appearance in UEFA Champions League)	0	6	0
Chelsea	Total		4	0	1	0	0	0	1	0	6	0
Queens Park Rangers (loan)	2006–07	Championship	28	0	2	0	0	0	—		30	0
Queens Park Rangers (loan)	2007–08	Championship	30	0	0	0	1	0	—		31	0
Queens Park Rangers (loan)	Total		58	0	2	0	1	0	—		61	0
Wolverhampton Wanderers (loan)	2008–09	Championship	10	0	0	0	0	0	—		10	0
Wolverhampton Wanderers (loan)	2009–10	Premier League	30	0	3	0	0	0	—		33	0
Wolverhampton Wanderers (loan)	2010–11	Premier League	16	0	0	0	1	0	—		17	0
Wolverhampton Wanderers (loan)	Total		56	0	3	0	1	0	—		60	0
Hamburger SV	2011–12	Bundesliga	16	0	2	0	—		—		18	0
Hamburger SV	2012–13	Bundesliga	21	0	1	0	—		—		22	0
Hamburger SV	2013–14	Bundesliga	12	0	1	0	—		2 (Note: Appearances in Bundesliga relegation play-offs)	0	15	0
Hamburger SV	Total		49	0	4	0	—		2	0	55	0
Nottingham Forest	2014–15	Championship	36	0	0	0	2	0	—		38	0
Nottingham Forest	2015–16	Championship	31	0	1	0	1	0	—		33	0
Nottingham Forest	2016–17	Championship	28	0	1	0	1	0	—		30	0
Nottingham Forest	2017–18	Championship	29	0	2	0	2	0	—		33	0
Nottingham Forest	Total		124	0	4	0	6	0	—		134	0
New England Revolution	2018	MLS	10	0	0	0	0	0	—		0	0
New England Revolution	2019	MLS	16	1	0	0	0	0	—		16	1
New England Revolution	2020	MLS	7	0	0	0	0	0	—		7	0
New England Revolution	Total		31	1	0	0	0	0	—		31	1
Burton Albion	2020–21	League One	17	0	0	0	0	0	0	0	17	0
Burton Albion	2021–22	League One	22	0	2	0	0	0	0	0	24	0
Burton Albion	2022–23	League One	1	0	0	0	0	0	1 (Note: Appearance(s) in EFL Trophy)	0	2	0
Burton Albion	Total		40	0	2	0	0	0	1	0	43	0
Career total			362	1	16	0	8	0	4	0	390	1

=== International ===
Appearances and goals by national team and year
National team	Year	Apps	Goals
Seychelles	2022	3	0
Seychelles	2023	4	1
Total		7	1

Scores and results list Seychelles' goal tally first, score column indicates score after each Mancienne goal.

List of international goals scored by Michael Mancienne
No.	Date	Venue	Opponent	Score	Result	Competition	Ref.
1	28 March 2023	Sylhet District Stadium, Sylhet, Bangladesh	Bangladesh	1–0	1–0	Friendly	

== Honours ==
Chelsea

- FA Cup: 2008–09

England U21

- UEFA European Under-21 Championship runner-up: 2009

Individual

- Chelsea Young Player of the Year: 2008–09
