= Lee Nguyen =

American soccer player (born 1986)

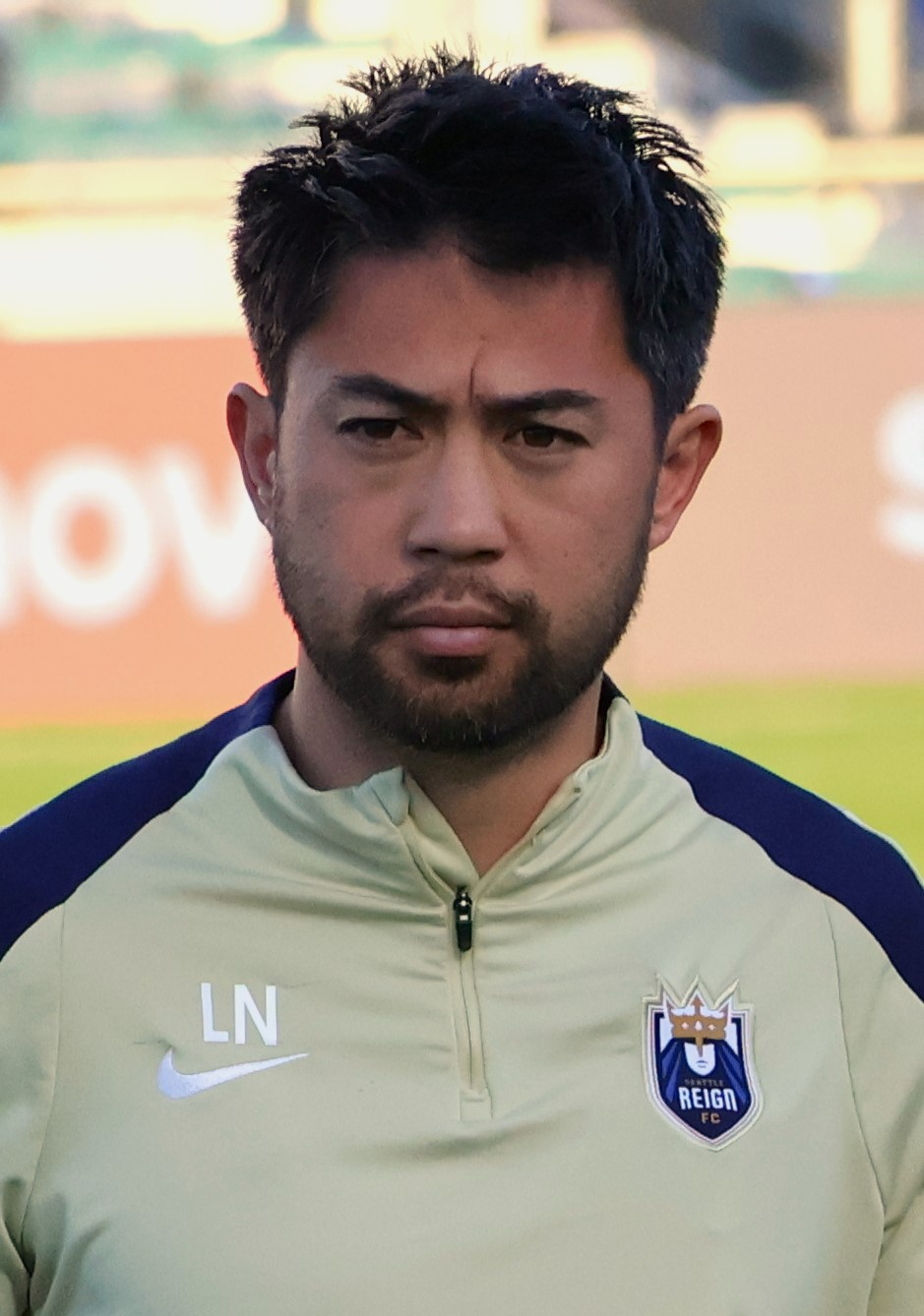
- Nguyen with the Seattle Reign in 2025

Personal information
- Full name: Lee Nguyễn Thế Anh
- Date of birth: October 7, 1986 (age 40)
- Place of birth: Richardson, Texas, U.S.
- Height: 5 ft 8 in (1.73 m)
- Position: Midfielder

Team information
- Current team: Dallas Trinity (head coach)

Youth career
- 2000–2004: Dallas Texans

College career
Years	Team	Apps	(Gls)
2005	Indiana Hoosiers	22	(5)

Senior career*
Years	Team	Apps	(Gls)
2006–2008	PSV Eindhoven	1	(0)
2008–2009	Randers	22	(0)
2009–2010	Hoàng Anh Gia Lai	23	(9)
2010–2011	Becamex Bình Dương	15	(2)
2012–2018	New England Revolution	191	(51)
2018–2019	Los Angeles FC	48	(3)
2020	Inter Miami CF	5	(0)
2020	New England Revolution	12	(1)
2021–2022	Ho Chi Minh City	23	(7)
Total		340	(73)

International career
2005	United States U20	2	(0)
2007–2016	United States	9	(0)

Managerial career
- 2021–2022: Washington Spirit (assistant)
- 2023: Kansas City Current (assistant)
- 2024: Angel City (assistant)
- 2025–2026: Seattle Reign (assistant)
- 2026–: Dallas Trinity
- * Club domestic league appearances and goals

Lee Nguyen (Vietnamese: Nguyễn Thế Anh, born October 7, 1986) is an American professional soccer coach and former player who is currently the head coach of USL Super League club Dallas Trinity FC.

Nguyen's 15-year playing career spanned the Netherlands, Denmark, Vietnam, and the United States, where he appeared in over 250 league matches in Major League Soccer. After winning two Eredivisie titles and a Johan Cruijff Shield with PSV Eindhoven, Nguyen spent two seasons in Vietnam before moving to Major League Soccer, where he led the New England Revolution to the 2014 MLS Cup final and won the 2019 Supporters' Shield title with Los Angeles FC. Nguyen returned to Vietnam to sign with Ho Chi Minh City in 2021.

== Youth and college ==
Nguyen graduated from Plano East Senior High School in his native Texas and was named National Gatorade Boys Soccer High School Player of the Year in 2005. He played one season for Indiana University in 2005, producing five goals and 12 assists in 22 games and was selected as 2005 National Freshman of the Year by Soccer America and Soccer Times. Nguyen was also a first team All-Big Ten selection and Big Ten Freshman of the Year.

== Club career ==
=== PSV Eindhoven ===
Nguyen began his professional career by signing a three-and-a-half-year deal with Dutch Eredivisie team PSV Eindhoven in February 2006, but after making just two appearances with the club's senior team, he moved on to get more first-team time somewhere else. Despite only making two appearances they were historic as he became the first player of Vietnamese descent to appear in top flight European football.

=== Randers FC ===
On January 31, 2008, Nguyen signed with the Danish Superliga club Randers FC until the summer of 2009. He made 23 appearances with the club in parts of two seasons.

=== Hoàng Anh Gia Lai ===
With Nguyen still hoping to remain in Europe but ready for a change of scenery, V.League 1 club Hoàng Anh Gia Lai, based in the centrally located city of Pleiku, gave his Vietnamese father a contract offer in January 2009 to pass along to his son. The offer was much more lucrative than what he could have hoped for anywhere else, but by accepting it he took himself completely off the United States Men's National Team radar at the age of 23 after just three appearances.

Nguyen became the Vietnamese league's first American player when he signed with Hoàng Anh Gia Lai on January 17, 2009. He scored 13 goals and 16 assists in 24 appearances in all competitions for the club in 2009. Through club partnership connections, Nguyen spent the middle of 2009 training with English club Arsenal in the hopes of earning another contract in Europe.

=== Becamex Binh Duong ===
In January 2010, Nguyen signed with another V.League 1 club, Becamex Binh Duong F.C. in Thủ Dầu Một. Injuries limited his impact as he scored just one goal in five appearances for the club in one and a half years. His desire to play for the U.S. was rekindled, however, by the August 2011 hiring of head coach Jurgen Klinsmann, whose style Nguyen hoped would better fit his midfield skills. Despite a large new contract offer in Vietnam, he decided to return to the U.S.

=== New England Revolution ===
Nguyen signed a multi-year deal with Major League Soccer on December 7, 2011, and was originally allocated to the Vancouver Whitecaps FC in a weighted lottery. He made three preseason appearances with Vancouver before being waived on March 1, 2012. On March 2, 2012, he was selected by the New England Revolution with the second overall pick in the MLS Waiver Draft.

Nguyen made 30 regular-season appearances for the Revolution in 2012, including 27 starts. He finished second on the team in scoring with five goals (two assists) and was voted the Midnight Riders Man of Year by the fans. His second career MLS goal—and second goal of the game against Vancouver on May 12—was one of four finalists for the MLS Goal of the Year Award. He was named MLS Player of the Week for matchweek 10 following that performance, and also named team of the week the following week along with Revolution Team Most Valuable Player for 2012.

In 2013, Nguyen appeared in 33 league matches, scoring four goals and recording seven assists, helping the Revolution reach the playoffs for the first time since 2009. He also was selected to team of the week during week nine of the season.

Nguyen had a banner year in the 2014 New England Revolution season, leading the Revolution in scoring with 18 goals and 5 assists (the most ever by a Revolution midfielder in an MLS season), and again being voted the Midnight Riders Man of the Year. He was named Revolution Team MVP, MLS Player of the Month for October, a 2014 MLS-All Star, and an MLS "Best XI" selection. For his contributions to the team—including 9 game-winning goals in the regular season—Nguyen was named as a finalist for the 2014 version of the Major League Soccer MVP Award along with Seattle Sounders FC forward Obafemi Martins and Los Angeles Galaxy forward Robbie Keane. Nguyen's goal against the Houston Dynamo (which was named MLS Goal of the Week for matchweek 32) also made it to the final round of voting for the 2014 version of the MLS Goal of the Year Award. He was named MLS Player of the Week for matchweek 32.

Nguyen led the team in assists with at the time career best 10, and finished second in team scoring with seven goals during the 2015 season. He was named to MLS team of the week during week 27 after a three assist game vs Dallas F.C.

During the 2016 season, Nguyen became the Revolution's team captain. He led the team in assists, with 10, and finished 3rd in goals scored, with 6. He additionally led the team in matches started, with 33, and minutes played. His week 18 goal against Columbus Crew on July 9 won MLS Goal of the Week. He also became the fourth player is MLS history to record four assists in a game during their week 27 match vs Orlando.

In August 2017, The Revolution reportedly rejected a $1 million bid for Nguyen from Israeli Premier League side Maccabi Haifa. He would finish the 2017 season first in assists, and second in goals scored, with 15 and 11 respectively. He again led the team in games started (tied with Andrew Farrell).

Citing frustration over his contract (he was at the time the seventh-highest paid player on the team, making $500,000, despite ranking fifth in the league in over-all goals over the previous four seasons), Nguyen reportedly demanded a trade at the end of the 2017 season on three separate occasions. The dispute would ultimately lead to his sitting-out the team's pre-season training camp.

=== Los Angeles FC ===
On May 1, 2018, New England traded Nguyen to Los Angeles FC for $350,000 in General Allocation Money and $350,000 in Targeted Allocation Money. On July 26, 2018, Nguyen scored on a free kick leading Los Angeles FC to a 2–0 lead over LA Galaxy. The match ultimately ended 2–2 after a second-half comeback by their crosstown rival.

=== Inter Miami CF ===
On November 19, 2019, Nguyen was selected by MLS expansion side Inter Miami CF in the 2019 MLS Expansion Draft. He only made 5 appearances with the club that season.

=== Return to New England Revolution ===
Nguyen was traded back to the Revolution on September 8, 2020, for a fourth-round selection in the 2021 MLS SuperDraft and up to $50,000 in General Allocation Money.

Nguyen made 12 appearances for the Revolution in 2020, starting 8 matches and scoring one goal, an 80th-minute penalty against NYCFC on October 11.

=== Ho Chi Minh City FC ===
On December 25, 2020, Ho Chi Minh City announced the signing of Lee Nguyen.

On August 8, 2021, Nguyen left Ho Chi Minh City to return in Texas as the 2021 V.League 1 season ended early due to the COVID-19 pandemic in Vietnam.

=== Return to soccer and 2nd stint at Ho Chi Minh City ===
After retiring from playing and becoming the assistant coach of the Washington Spirit in early 2022, on August 6, 2022, Nguyen came out of retirement and return to play for Ho Chi Minh City. During his to seasons with the club he scored 7 goals in 23 appearances.

=== The Soccer Tournament ===
In 2023, Nguyen played in The Soccer Tournament with ZALA FFF.

== International career ==
After playing for several United States junior level squads, namely the under-18s, under-20s, and under-23s, including being the only high school player named to the under-20 roster for the 2005 FIFA World Youth Championship, Nguyen made his debut for the senior United States Men's National Team in a friendly against China on June 2, 2007. He made two other appearances with the team in 2007 as part of the Copa América roster.

On November 10, 2014, Jürgen Klinsmann called up Nguyen for the first time in seven years for friendlies against Colombia and the Republic of Ireland, and again on January 9, 2015, for the training camp ahead of the friendlies against Chile and Panama. Nguyen made his reappearance with the USMNT as a substitute in a friendly match against Costa Rica on October 13, 2015. During the January 2016, training camp Nguyen was called up to start two matches for the USMNT. This marked his final stint with the USMNT.

== Coaching career ==
On October 6, 2021, Nguyen worked with the Washington Spirit and went on to win the NWSL Championship. Following that season, he announced his retirement from professional soccer, and re-signed with the Washington Spirit as an assistant coach.

On June 14, 2023, the Kansas City Current announced the hiring of Nguyen as an assistant coach under interim head coach Caroline Sjöblom.

On January 9, 2024, Angel City FC announced they had hired Nguyen as an assistant coach to work under head coach Becki Tweed.

He joined Seattle Reign FC as an assistant coach in February 2025.

On July 2, 2026, USL Super League side Dallas Trinity FC unveiled Nguyen as both the club's new head coach and technical director.

== Personal life ==
Nguyen holds dual citizenship of the United States and Vietnam.

Lee Nguyen's father, Pham Nguyen, fled to the United States a few years before the fall of Saigon, precisely in 1973, and later settled in Richardson, Texas, where Lee was born. Pham also played soccer in his youth.

In 2012, Nguyen was named one of The Boston Globe's 25 Most Stylish Bostonians.

== Career statistics ==
=== Club ===
Appearances and goals by club, season and competition
Club	Season	League			National cup		Other		Total	
Club	Season	Division	Apps	Goals	Apps	Goals	Apps	Goals	Apps	Goals
PSV Eindhoven	2005–06	Eredivisie	1	0	0	0	0	0	1	0
PSV Eindhoven	2006–07	Eredivisie	0	0	0	0	1 (Note: Appearance in Johan Cruyff Shield)	0	1	0
PSV Eindhoven	Total		1	0	0	0	1	0	2	0
Randers	2007–08	Danish Superliga	13	0	0	0	—		13	0
Randers	2008–09	Danish Superliga	9	0	0	0	—		9	0
Randers	Total		22	0	0	0	0	0	22	0
Hoang Anh Gia Lai	2009	V.League 1	22	9	2	4	—		24	13
Hoang Anh Gia Lai	2010	V.League 1	1	0	0	0	—		1	0
Hoang Anh Gia Lai	Total		23	9	2	4	0	0	25	13
Becamex Binh Duong	2010	V.League 1	10	0	0	0	—		10	0
Becamex Binh Duong	2011	V.League 1	5	2	0	0	—		5	2
Becamex Binh Duong	Total		15	2	0	0	0	0	15	2
New England Revolution	2012	MLS	30	5	0	0	—		30	5
New England Revolution	2013	MLS	33	4	0	0	2 (Note: Appearance(s) in MLS Cup playoffs)	0	35	4
New England Revolution	2014	MLS	32	18	0	0	5	2	37	19
New England Revolution	2015	MLS	32	7	0	0	1	0	33	7
New England Revolution	2016	MLS	33	6	5	0	—		38	6
New England Revolution	2017	MLS	31	11	2	0	—		33	11
New England Revolution	Total		191	51	7	0	8	2	206	52
Los Angeles FC	2018	MLS	25	3	4	0	1	0	30	3
Los Angeles FC	2019	MLS	23	0	2	1	2	0	27	1
Los Angeles FC	Total		48	3	6	1	3	0	57	4
Inter Miami CF	2020	MLS	5	0	0	0	—		5	0
New England Revolution	2020	MLS	12	1	0	0	2	0	14	1
Ho Chi Minh City	2021	V.League 1	9	5	0	0	—		9	5
Ho Chi Minh City	2022	V.League 1	14	2	0	0	—		14	2
Career total			340	73	15	5	14	2	369	79

=== International ===
Appearances and goals by national team and year
National team	Year	Apps	Goals
United States
United States	2007	3	0
United States	2014	1	0
United States	2015	3	0
United States	2016	2	0
Total		9	0

== Honors ==
PSV Eindhoven

- Eredivisie: 2006–07, 2007–08
- Johan Cruijff Shield: 2008

Los Angeles FC

- Supporters' Shield: 2019

Individual

- Gatorade High School Soccer Player of the Year: 2005
- All-Big Ten: 2005
- Big Ten Freshman of the Year: 2005
- MLS Best XI: 2014
- MLS All-Star: 2014
- MLS Player of the Month: October 2014
- New England Revolution Team MVP: 2012, 2014
- Midnight Riders Man of the Year: 2012, 2014
- New England Revolution All-Time Team: 2020
