= Gabriel Somi =

Syrian footballer

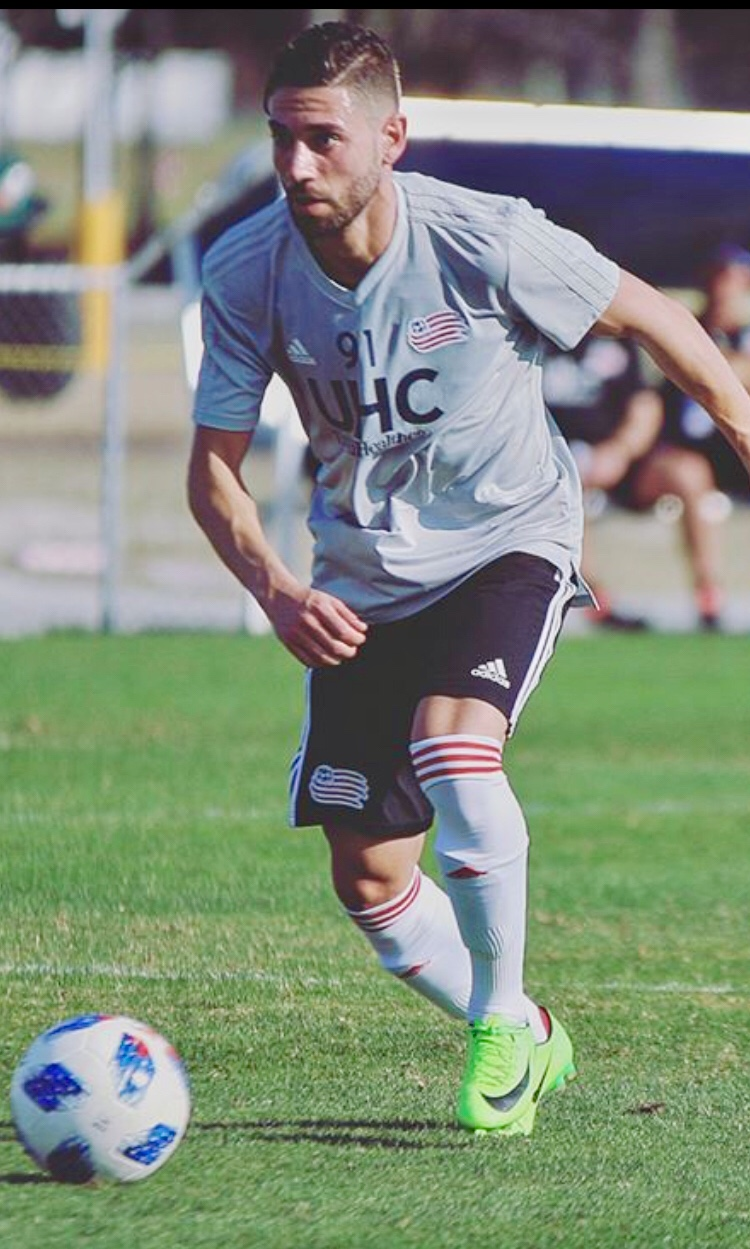

Personal information
- Full name: Gabriel Somi
- Date of birth: 24 August 1991 (age 35)
- Place of birth: Örebro, Sweden
- Height: 1.76 m (5 ft 9 1/2 in)
- Positions: Left back; midfielder

Team information
- Current team: United IK Nordic

Youth career
- IFK Kumla

Senior career*
Years	Team	Apps	(Gls)
2009–2011	Örebro Syrianska	62	(7)
2012–2015	Syrianska	75	(2)
2016–2017	Östersunds FK	30	(3)
2018–2019	New England Revolution	14	(0)
2020	AFC Eskilstuna	26	(0)
2021–	United IK Nordic	21	(3)

International career^{‡}
2019	Syria	2	(0)
- * Club domestic league appearances and goals as of 17:26, 18 April 2021 (UTC) ‡ National team caps and goals as of 23 March 2019

Gabriel Somi (born 24 August 1991) is a professional footballer who played most recently for AFC Eskilstuna as a left back. Born in Sweden, he played for the Syria national football team.

== Club career ==
=== Örebro Syrianska ===
Born in Örebro, Sweden, Somi began his career at IFK Kumla before joining Örebro Syrianska in 2009. Somi spent two years at Örebro Syrianska, making 67 appearances and scoring 5 times before joining Syrianska FC.

=== Syrianska FC ===
On 15 February 2012, Somi moved to a bigger challenge when he joined Allsvenskan side Syrianska.

Somi made his Syrianska FC debut, where he started the whole game, in a 2–1 win over IFK Göteborg in the opening game of the season. Since making his debut, Somi quickly received a handful of first team appearances. However, he soon lost his first team place to Rabi Elia and was demoted to the substitute bench as a result. Around July, Somi soon regained his first team for the side, though he appeared in and out of the starting eleven. However, he suffered an injury and was substituted in the 22nd minute, in a 5–1 loss against BK Häcken on 6 October 2012. Despite this, Somi went on to make 18 appearances in all competitions at the end of the 2012 season.

In the 2013 season, Somi made his first appearance of the season, where he started before coming off at half–time, in a 1–0 win over Djurgården on 27 April 2013. However, his first team opportunities at the club became limited, leading him to be placed on the substitute bench. Despite this, he ended making 12 appearances in all competitions.

In the 2014 season, Somi later regained his first team place at the club, playing in the left–back position throughout the season. During a 3–1 win over Östersunds FK on 25 April 2014, Somi then won a penalty after being fouled in the box, leading Nikola Grubješić successfully convert the penalty to score the opener. After serving a one match suspension, he scored on his return on 14 September 2014, in a 3–1 win over Östers IF. Although the club were relegated to Superettan, Somi ended the season, making a total of 29 appearances in all competitions. At the end of the 2014 season, Somi began attracting interests from the club.

Despite the speculation, Somi remained at Syrianska for the 2015 season. At the start of the 2015 season, Somi continued to regain his first team place in the left–back position at the club. He then scored his first goal of the season, in a 3–0 win over GAIS on 3 June 2015. He then captained side on four occasions later in the season. He finished the season, making a total of 28 appearances and scoring once in all competitions. At the end of the 2015 season, the club said they would be interested in offering Somi a new contract, though Somi, himself, said he yet received the offer.

=== Östersunds FK ===
After his contract at Syrianska FC came to an end, Somi joined newly–promoted Allsvenskan side Östersunds FK on 18 November 2015.

Somi made his Östersunds FK debut, where he started and played 58 minutes before coming off, due to injury, in a 1–1 draw against Hammarby on 4 April 2016. After returning from injury that saw him miss one match, Somi was featured in and out of the first team for the side. However, he soon lost his first team places and resulted in him on the substitute bench. At the end of the 2016 season, he went on to make 19 appearances in all competitions. Although he received a lack of first team football in the 2016 season, Somi stated that he would not be leaving the club.

In the 2017 season, Somi made his first start of the season, where he played the whole game, in a 3–1 win over AFC Eskilstuna on 26 April 2017. However, he continued to find himself out of the first team, as he remained on the substitute bench. He also was dropped from the squad for the Svenska Cupen Final, where Östersunds FK won their first Svenska Cupen title after defeating IFK Norrköping 4–1. He then scored his first goals of the season, in a 2–2 draw against AIK on 2 July 2017. He then made his UEFA Europa League debut, where he came on as a late substitute, in a 2–0 win over Galatasaray on 13 July 2017; ultimately, the club would later progress after a 1–1 draw in the second leg. After making his Europa League debut, Somi then set up two goals, in a 2–2 draw against Djurgården on 16 July 2017. Due to his lack of playing time for the side, Somi wanted to leave the club, citing his disappointment over lack of first team football. Despite this, on 3 August 2017, Somi scored a vital role in the return leg of UEFA Europa League, in a 2–1 win over CS Fola Esch to send them through to the Play–Offs Round. After missing out two matches, Somi returned to the first team, where he started the match, in a 2–0 win over PAOK, which saw them go through away goal and progress to the UEFA Europa League Group Stage. Three days later, on 27 August 2017, Somi scored his third goal of the season, in a 2–0 win over IFK Norrköping. Later in the 2017 season, Somi continued to appear in and out of the first team. At the end of the 2017 season, Somi went on to make 25 appearances and scoring 4 times in all competitions.

At the end of 2017 season, Somi found himself linked a move away from the club, as IFK Göteborg among interested. However, it was announced that Somi would be leaving the club in favour of moving to an unknown MLS club.

=== New England Revolution ===
Somi signed with Major League Soccer side New England Revolution on 5 January 2018. The move was completed upon receipt of his International Transfer Certificate (ITC).

=== Eskilstuna ===
On 18 February 2020, Somi joined AFC Eskilstuna back in Sweden. He left the club again at the end of the year.

== International career ==
In October 2017, he decided to represent his parents home country Syria, and he was called up by the Syria national football team to play in the 2018 FIFA World Cup qualification (AFC) play-offs against Australia. But he didn't get any cap till now. However, Syria were eliminated after losing 3–2 on aggregate.

He got his first cap on 20 March 2019 against Iraq in 2019 International Friendship Championship.

== Personal life ==
Somi's parents, who were Christians living in Syria, moved to Sweden in 1989 with their three daughters to seek out a better life. Two years after settling into Sweden, Gabriel was born in the town of Örebro in 1991. Despite growing up in Sweden, Somi revealed that his parents reminded him of his true heritage.

== Honours ==
=== Club ===
Östersund

- Svenska Cupen: 2016–17
