= Brandon Bye =

American soccer player (born 1995)

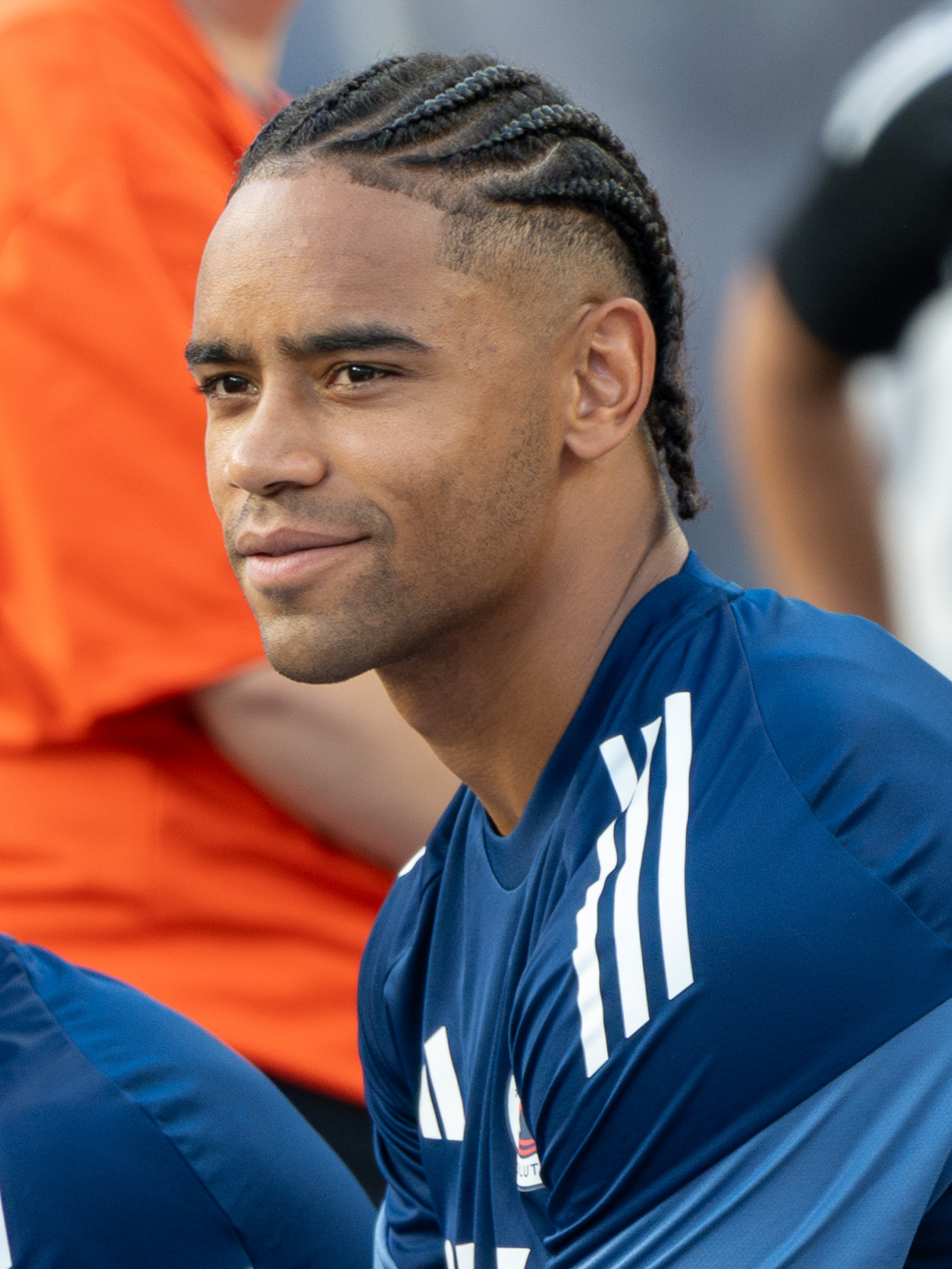
- Bye with the New England Revolution in 2025

Personal information
- Full name: Brandon Scott Bye
- Date of birth: November 29, 1995 (age 30)
- Place of birth: Kalamazoo, Michigan, United States
- Height: 6 ft 0 in (1.83 m)
- Positions: Winger; full-back

Team information
- Current team: Portland Timbers
- Number: 5

Youth career
- Kalamazoo Kingdom
- Alliance FC

College career
Years	Team	Apps	(Gls)
2014–2017	Western Michigan Broncos	64	(22)

Senior career*
Years	Team	Apps	(Gls)
2015	Grand Rapids FC		
2016	Kalamazoo FC	12	(3)
2017	Minneapolis City SC	3	(1)
2018–2025	New England Revolution	189	(10)
2026–	Portland Timbers	18	(1)
- * Club domestic league appearances and goals as of September 22, 2025

Brandon Scott Bye (born November 29, 1995) is an American professional soccer player who plays for Major League Soccer club Portland Timbers.

== Career ==
=== College and amateur ===
Bye was born in Kalamazoo, Michigan and grew up in nearby Portage, Michigan. He played his college career at Western Michigan University where he played mainly as a winger. Bye played 64 matches for the Broncos, starting 62. He scored 22 goals and had 19 assists.

Bye also played for National Premier Soccer League sides Grand Rapids FC, Kalamazoo FC and Minneapolis City SC.

=== Professional ===
On January 19, 2018, New England Revolution selected Bye with the 8th overall pick of the 2018 MLS SuperDraft. He signed with the club on February 10, 2018.

Bye made his professional debut on March 3, 2018, as a 55th-minute substitute during a 0–2 loss to Philadelphia Union.

Bye scored his first professional goal, an 82nd-minute equalizer against Los Angeles FC, on September 15, 2018. He made his 150th MLS regular season start on February 22, 2025 in the Revolution's 2025 season opener, a 1–1 draw against Nashville SC.

== Career statistics ==
=== Club ===
As of match played December 16, 2020

Appearances and goals by club, season and competition
Club	Season	League			National cup		Other		Total	
Club	Season	Division	Apps	Goals	Apps	Goals	Apps	Goals	Apps	Goals
Kalamazoo FC	2016	NPSL	12	3	—		—		12	3
Minneapolis City SC	2017	NPSL	3	1	—		—		3	1
New England Revolution	2018	MLS	24	1	1	0	—		25	1
New England Revolution	2019	MLS	30	2	2	0	1 (Note: Appearance(s) in MLS Cup Playoffs)	0	33	2
New England Revolution	2020	MLS	22	0	—		2	0	24	0
New England Revolution	Total		76	3	3	0	3	0	82	3
Career total			91	7	3	0	3	0	97	7

== Honors ==
New England Revolution

- Supporters' Shield: 2021
