= 2020 Columbus Crew SC season =

Columbus Crew SC
2020 season
- Investor-operators: Dee Haslam; Jimmy Haslam; JW Johnson; Whitney Johnson; Dr. Pete Edwards
- Head coach: Caleb Porter
- Stadium: MAPFRE Stadium
- Major League Soccer: Conference: 3rd Overall: 4th
- MLS Cup playoffs: Eastern Conference Champions; MLS Cup Champions
- U.S. Open Cup: Canceled
- MLS is Back Tournament: Round of 16
- Top goalscorer: League: Gyasi Zardes (12); All: Gyasi Zardes (15)
- Highest home attendance: 17,473 (3/7 v. SEA)
- Lowest home attendance: 0 (Multiple Games)
- Average home league attendance: 3,259 (16.3%) (Overall); 17,473 (87.5%) (Pre-Covid); 1,482 (7.4%) (Post-Covid)
- Biggest win: CIN 0–4 CLB (7/11)
- Biggest defeat: TOR 3–1 CLB (9/27)
Home colors	Away colors

The 2020 Columbus Crew SC season was the club's 25th season of existence and their 25th consecutive season in Major League Soccer, the top flight of soccer in the United States and Canada. The first match of the season was on March 1 against New York City FC. It was the second season under head coach Caleb Porter. Columbus were also set to compete in the U.S. Open Cup, before its cancelation due to the COVID-19 pandemic. This was the first season without Wil Trapp and Federico Higuain since 2012 and 2011, respectively.

The 2020 season saw Columbus earn their second ever MLS Cup championship, their first since 2008. Columbus defeated Seattle Sounders FC, 3–0 in the championship match.

== Roster ==
As of match played November 8, 2020

Note: Flags indicate national team as defined under FIFA eligibility rules; some limited exceptions apply. Players may hold more than one non-FIFA nationality.

No.	Pos.	Nation	Player
1	GK	CUW	Eloy Room (INT)
2	DF	SCO	Chris Cadden (INT)
3	DF	USA	Josh Williams
4	DF	GHA	Jonathan Mensah
5	DF	NED	Vito Wormgoor (INT)
6	MF	USA	Darlington Nagbe (Captain; DP)
7	MF	POR	Pedro Santos (INT)
8	MF	BRA	Artur
9	FW	NGR	Fanendo Adi
10	MF	ARM	Lucas Zelarayán (INT; DP)
11	FW	USA	Gyasi Zardes (DP)
12	MF	CRC	Luis Díaz (INT; YDP)
13	GK	USA	Andrew Tarbell (SUP)
14	DF	CRC	Waylon Francis
16	MF	USA	Hector Jiménez
17	FW	CAN	Jordan Hamilton (SUP)

No.	Pos.	Nation	Player
18	MF	USA	Sebastian Berhalter (HGP; SUP)
19	DF	ARG	Milton Valenzuela (INT)
20	FW	GHA	Emmanuel Boateng
21	MF	USA	Aidan Morris (HGP; SUP)
22	MF	HAI	Derrick Etienne Jr. (SUP)
23	MF	USA	Grant Lillard (SUP)
24	GK	USA	Jon Kempin (SUP)
25	DF	GHA	Harrison Afful
26	MF	USA	Fatai Alashe
27	FW	ESP	Miguel Berry (SUP)
28	GK	USA	Matt Lampson (SUP)
29	FW	HUN	Krisztián Németh
30	DF	USA	Aboubacar Keita (HGP; SUP)
34	MF	MAR	Youness Mokhtar (INT)

== Technical Staff ==
Position	Staff
President & General Manager	(United States) Tim Bezbatchenko
Executive Vice President, Chief Business Officer	(United States) Steve Lyons
Head Coach	(United States) Caleb Porter
Technical Director, VP of Soccer Operations	(Canada) Pat Onstad
Assistant General Manager, Crew 2 General Manager	(Canada) Corey Wray
Director of Scouting	(Scotland) Neil McGuinness
Director of Player Personnel and Strategy	(France) Issa Tall
Director of High Performance	(United States) Clive Brewer
Assistant Coach	(United States) Ben Cross
Assistant Coach	(Saint Vincent and the Grenadines) Ezra Hendrickson
Assistant Coach	(Uruguay) Pablo Moreira
Assistant Coach	(United States) Tim Hanley
Strength & Conditioning Coach	(United States) Brook Hamilton
Fitness Coach	(Portugal) Federico Pizzuto
Assistant Strength & Conditioning Coach	(United States) Kelly Roderick
Head Athletic Trainer	(United States) Chris Shenberger
Assistant Athletic Trainer	(United States) Daniel Givens
Assistant Athletic Trainer	(Canada) Lageishon Mohanadas
Head Equipment Manager	(United States) David Brauzer
Team Coordinator	(United States) Julio Velasquez
Assistant Equipment Manager	(United States) Ron Meadors
Data Analyst	(United States) Alex Mysiw
Dietician	(United States) Jay Short
Video Analyst	(United States) Liviu Bird
Player Care Coordinator	(United States) McKenzie Bostic

Source: []

== Non-competitive ==
=== Preseason ===
The Crew started preseason in Columbus. They then played games in California, Mexico and Arizona as part of the 2020 Visit Tucson Sun Cup before returning to Ohio. The Crew brought in the following trialists during training camp: Derrick Etienne.

Unsigned draft picks Miguel Berry, Remi Prieur and Danny Griffin also joined the team for preseason.

January 24 Friendly	Ventura County Fusion	1–5	Columbus Crew SC	Chula Vista, CA
	Goal	Report; Report	Santos; Berry; Etienne; Griffin; Williams
Note: Played in three 30-minute periods.

January 28 Friendly	Vancouver Whitecaps FC	1–1	Columbus Crew SC	Chula Vista, CA
	Raposo 51'	Report	Santos 40'

February 1 Friendly	Orlando City SC	Canceled	Columbus Crew SC	Playa del Carmen, Mexico
		Report		Stadium: Pure Mareazul Riviera Maya
Note: Canceled due to inclement weather and field conditions.

February 3 Friendly	San Jose Earthquakes	1–4	Columbus Crew SC	Cancun, Mexico
	Skahan 7'; Calvillo (yellow card) 25'; Haji (yellow card) 32'	Report	Adi 30'; Santos 36' (pen.); Hamilton 63'; Etienne 117'	Stadium: Universidad La Salle
Note: Played in four 30-minute periods.

February 12 Friendly	Sporting Kansas City	0–2	Columbus Crew SC	Casa Grande, AZ
		Report; Report	Zardes 1'; Santos 43' (pen.)	Stadium: Grande Sports World

February 15 Visit Tucson Sun Cup	Phoenix Rising FC	0–1	Columbus Crew SC	Tempe, AZ
9:00 PM EST	Lambert (yellow card) 36'; Cochran (yellow card) 41'	Report	Zardes 73'	Stadium: Casino Arizona Field

February 19 Visit Tucson Sun Cup	New York Red Bulls	1–1	Columbus Crew SC	Tempe, AZ
8:30 PM EST	White 68'	Report	Etienne 1'	Stadium: Kino North Stadium

February 22 Visit Tucson Sun Cup	Houston Dynamo	1–4	Columbus Crew SC	Tempe, AZ
7:00 PM EST	McNamara 52'	Report	Zardes 1', 23'; Mensah 4'; Zelarayán 15'	Stadium: Kino North Stadium

=== Midseason ===
March 2 Friendly	Columbus Crew SC	3–0	Pittsburgh Riverhounds SC	Obetz, OH
2:00 PM EST	Adi 37', 54'; Berry 47'	Report		Stadium: Crew SC Training Center

== Competitive ==
=== Overview ===
Competition	First match	Last match	Starting round	Final position	Record							
Competition	First match	Last match	Starting round	Final position	Pld	W	D	L	GF	GA	GD	Win %
Major League Soccer	March 1, 2020	November 8, 2020	Matchday 1	4th	23	12	5	6	36	21	+15	52.17
MLS Cup Playoffs	November 21, 2020	December 6, 2020	First Round	Winners	4	4	0	0	9	2	+7	100.00
MLS is Back Tournament Knockout Round	July 28, 2020	July 28, 2020	Round of 16	Round of 16	1	0	1	0	1	1	+0	0.00
Total					28	16	6	6	46	24	+22	57.14

Source: Competitions

=== MLS ===
==== Standings ====
===== Eastern Conference =====
Pos	Team	Pld	W	L	T	GF	GA	GD	Pts	PPG	Qualification
1	Philadelphia Union	23	14	4	5	44	20	+24	47	2.04	Qualification for the playoffs first round and CONCACAF Champions League (Note: As Supporters' Shield winners)
2	Toronto FC (Note: Canadian clubs could not qualify for the 2021 CONCACAF Champions League through the MLS regular season or playoffs.)	23	13	5	5	33	26	+7	44	1.91	Qualification for the playoffs first round and CONCACAF Champions League (Note: As 2020 Canadian Championship finalists (awarded by Canada Soccer))
3	Columbus Crew SC (C)	23	12	6	5	36	21	+15	41	1.78	Qualification for the playoffs first round and CONCACAF Champions League (Note: As MLS Cup 2020 champions)
4	Orlando City SC	23	11	4	8	40	25	+15	41	1.78	Qualification for the playoffs first round and Leagues Cup
5	New York City FC	23	12	8	3	37	25	+12	39	1.70	Qualification for the playoffs first round and Leagues Cup

Source: MLS
Rules for classification: 1) points per game; 2) total wins per match played; 3) total goal differential per match played; 4) total goals scored per match played; 5) fewest disciplinary points per match played; 6) away goal differential per away match played; 7) away goals scored per away match played; 8) home goal differential per home match played; 9) home goals scored per home match played; 10) coin toss or drawing of lots.
(C) Champions

===== Overall table =====
2020 MLS overall standings
Pos	Team	Pld	W	L	T	GF	GA	GD	Pts	PPG	Qualification
2	Toronto FC (V)	23	13	5	5	33	26	+7	44	1.91	2021 CONCACAF Champions League (Note: As 2020 Canadian Championship finalists (awarded by Canada Soccer) (CAN1))
3	Sporting Kansas City	21	12	6	3	38	25	+13	39	1.86	2021 Leagues Cup (Note: As 1st, Western Conference (MLS1))
4	Columbus Crew SC (C)	23	12	6	5	36	21	+15	41	1.78	2021 CONCACAF Champions League (Note: As MLS Cup 2020 champions (USA1))
5	Orlando City SC	23	11	4	8	40	25	+15	41	1.78	2021 Leagues Cup (Note: As 4th, Eastern Conference (MLS2))
6	Seattle Sounders FC	22	11	5	6	44	23	+21	39	1.77	2021 Leagues Cup (Note: As 2nd, Western Conference (MLS3))

Source: MLS
Rules for classification: 1) points per game; 2) total wins per match played; 3) total goal differential per match played; 4) total goals scored per match played; 5) fewest disciplinary points per match played; 6) away goal differential per away match played; 7) away goals scored per away match played; 8) home goal differential per home match played; 9) home goals scored per home match played; 10) coin toss or drawing of lots.
(C) Champions; (V) Canadian Championship finalists

==== Results summary ====
Overall								Home						Away					
Pld	Pts	W	L	T	GF	GA	GD	W	L	T	GF	GA	GD	W	L	T	GF	GA	GD
23	41	12	6	5	36	21	+15	10	1	0	22	6	+16	2	5	5	14	15	−1

Source: MLS standings
Pld = Matches played; Pts = Points; W = Matches won; T = Matches tied; L = Matches lost; GF = Goals for; GA = Goals against; GD = Goal difference

==== Results by round ====
Round	1	2	3	4	5	6	7	8	9	10	11	12	13	14	15	16	17	18	19	20	21	22	23
Stadium	H	A	N	N	N	H	A	A	H	H	A	H	H	A	A	H	A	H	A	A	H	A	H
Result	W	D	W	W	W	W	L	D	W	W	D	W	W	L	D	L	L	W	D	L	W	L	W

Source: Columbus schedule
A = Away; H = Home; W = Win; D = Draw; L = Loss

==== Match results ====
On December 5, 2019, the league announced the home openers for every club, with Columbus playing New York City FC at MAPFRE Stadium. The schedule for the remainder of the season was released by the league on December 19, 2019. Due to the COVID-19 pandemic, the original schedule had to be shortened and was released in installments. The remainder of the regular season schedule was announced on September 22, 2020.

Original Schedule

March 1 1	Columbus Crew SC	1–0	New York City FC	Columbus, OH
12:30 PM EST	Wormgoor (yellow card) 10'; Santos (yellow card) 30'; Artur (yellow card) 53'; Zelarayán 56'; Afful (yellow card) 77'	Report	Chanot (red card) 3'; Héber (yellow card) 31'	Stadium: MAPFRE Stadium; Attendance: 17,473; Referee: Ramy Touchan; Assistant referees: Felisha Mariscal; Chris Elliott; Fourth official: Lukasz Szpala

March 7 2	Seattle Sounders FC	1–1	Columbus Crew SC	Seattle, WA
10:00 PM EST	Jones (yellow card) 36'; Ruidíaz 79' (pen.); João Paulo (yellow card) 85'	Report	Zardes 33'; Díaz (yellow card) 62'	Stadium: Century Link Field; Attendance: 33,080; Referee: Jair Marrufo; Assistant referees: Frank Anderson; Jeff Hosking; Fourth official: Guido Gonzalez Jr.

March 14 3	Columbus Crew SC	Canceled	Real Salt Lake	Columbus, OH
5:00 PM EDT				Stadium: MAPFRE Stadium

March 21 4	Nashville SC	Canceled	Columbus Crew SC	Nashville, TN
2:00 PM EDT				Stadium: Nissan Stadium

April 4 5	Columbus Crew SC	Canceled	Toronto FC	Columbus, OH
4:00 PM EDT				Stadium: MAPFRE Stadium

April 11 6	Columbus Crew SC	Canceled	Orlando City SC	Columbus, OH
7:30 PM EDT				Stadium: MAPFRE Stadium

April 19 7	Chicago Fire FC	Canceled	Columbus Crew SC	Chicago, IL
2:00 PM EDT				Stadium: Soldier Field

April 25 8	Columbus Crew SC	Canceled	Philadelphia Union	Columbus, OH
7:30 PM EDT				Stadium: MAPFRE Stadium

April 29 9	Columbus Crew SC	Canceled	Minnesota United FC	Columbus, OH
7:00 PM EDT				Stadium: MAPFRE Stadium

May 2 10	New York Red Bulls	Canceled	Columbus Crew SC	Harrison, NJ
7:30 PM EDT				Stadium: Red Bull Arena

May 9 11	Columbus Crew SC	Canceled	Montreal Impact	Columbus, OH
1:00 PM EDT				Stadium: MAPFRE Stadium

May 16 12	New England Revolution	Canceled	Columbus Crew SC	Foxborough, MA
7:30 PM EDT				Stadium: Gillette Stadium

May 23 13	Orlando City SC	Canceled	Columbus Crew SC	Orlando, FL
7:30 PM EDT				Stadium: Exploria Stadium

May 27 14	Columbus Crew SC	Canceled	Vancouver Whitecaps FC	Columbus, OH
7:30 PM EDT				Stadium: MAPFRE Stadium

May 30 15	Philadelphia Union	Canceled	Columbus Crew SC	Chester, PA
TBD				Stadium: Talen Energy Stadium

June 13 16	Columbus Crew SC	Canceled	Chicago Fire FC	Columbus, OH
7:30 PM EDT				Stadium: MAPFRE Stadium

June 17 17	FC Dallas	Canceled	Columbus Crew SC	Toyota Stadium
8:30 PM EDT

June 20 18	Columbus Crew SC	Canceled	D.C. United	Columbus, OH
7:30 PM EDT				Stadium: MAPFRE Stadium

June 27 19	Columbus Crew SC	Canceled	Atlanta United	Columbus, OH
7:30 PM EDT				Stadium: MAPFRE Stadium

July 1 20	Portland Timbers	Canceled	Columbus Crew SC	Portland, OR
10:30 PM EDT				Stadium: Providence Park

July 5 21	Columbus Crew SC	Canceled	Inter Miami CF	Columbus, OH
6:00 PM EDT				Stadium: MAPFRE Stadium

July 11 22	Montreal Impact	Canceled	Columbus Crew SC	Montreal, QC
7:00 PM EDT				Stadium: Stade Saputo

July 19 23	FC Cincinnati	Canceled	Columbus Crew SC	Cincinnati, OH
8:00 PM EDT				Stadium: Nippert Stadium

July 25 24	Columbus Crew SC	Canceled	Colorado Rapids	Columbus, OH
7:30 PM EDT				Stadium: MAPFRE Stadium

August 1 25	D.C. United	Canceled	Columbus Crew SC	Washington, D.C.
8:00 PM EDT				Stadium: Audi Field

August 8 26	Toronto FC	Canceled	Columbus Crew SC	Toronto, ON
7:30 PM EDT				Stadium: BMO Field

August 12 27	New York City FC	Canceled	Columbus Crew SC	New York, NY
7:00 PM EDT				Stadium: Yankee Stadium

August 15 28	Columbus Crew SC	Canceled	New England Revolution	Columbus, OH
7:30 PM EDT				Stadium: MAPFRE Stadium

August 22 29	Columbus Crew SC	Canceled	FC Cincinnati	Columbus, OH
7:30 PM EDT				Stadium: MAPFRE Stadium

August 29 30	Sporting Kansas City	Canceled	Columbus Crew SC	Kansas City, KS
8:30 PM EDT				Stadium: Children's Mercy Park

September 12 31	Columbus Crew SC	Canceled	Houston Dynamo	Columbus, OH
7:30 PM EDT				Stadium: MAPFRE Stadium

September 19 32	Columbus Crew SC	Canceled	New York Red Bulls	Columbus, OH
7:30 PM EDT				Stadium: MAPFRE Stadium

September 26 33	Atlanta United	Canceled	Columbus Crew SC	Atlanta, GA
6:00 PM EDT				Stadium: Mercedes-Benz Stadium

October 4 34	Inter Miami CF	Canceled	Columbus Crew SC	Fort Lauderdale, FL
4:30 PM EDT				Stadium: Fort Lauderdale Stadium

Restarted Schedule

July 11 3 (MiBT)	FC Cincinnati	0–4	Columbus Crew SC	Bay Lake, FL
10:30 PM EDT	Amaya (yellow card) 44'; Alashe (yellow card) 82'	Report	Zelarayán 27'; Zardes 30', 49'; Mokhtar 60'; Mensah (yellow card) 87'	Stadium: ESPN Wide World of Sports Complex; Attendance: 0 Referee: Ismail Elfath; Assistant referees: Andrew Bigelow; Cory Richardson; Fourth official: Ramy Touchan
Note: Group stage matches will count toward the MLS regular season standings.

July 16 4 (MiBT)	Columbus Crew SC	2–0	New York Red Bulls	Bay Lake, FL
10:30 PM EDT	Zardes 22'; Zelarayán 47'; Room (yellow card) 89'; Mokhtar (yellow card) 90+2'	Report	Tarek (yellow card) 61'; Duncan (yellow card) 90+3'	Stadium: ESPN Wide World of Sports Complex; Attendance: 0 Referee: Ramy Touchan; Assistant referees: Chris Wattam; Claudiu Badea; Fourth official: Ismail Elfath
Note: Group stage matches will count toward the MLS regular season standings.

July 21 5 (MiBT)	Atlanta United FC	0–1	Columbus Crew SC	Bay Lake, FL
8:00 PM EDT	Escobar (yellow card) 45+4'; Robinson (yellow card) 73'	Report	Mokhtar 18'; Valenzuela (yellow card) 25'; Santos (yellow card) 60'; Jiménez (yellow card) 85'; Díaz (yellow card) 90+3'	Stadium: ESPN Wide World of Sports Complex; Attendance: 0 Referee: Timothy Ford; Assistant referees: Andrew Bigelow; Jason White; Fourth official: Allen Chapman
Note: Group stage matches will count toward the MLS regular season standings.

August 20 6	Columbus Crew SC	3–0	Chicago Fire FC	Columbus, OH
7:30 PM EDT	Etienne 20'; Valenzuela (yellow card) 68'; Nagbe 81'; Zardes 88'	Report	Pineda (yellow card) 29'; Calvo (yellow card) 48'	Stadium: MAPFRE Stadium; Attendance: 0 Referee: Guido Gonzales Jr. Assistant referees: Cory Richardson; Benjamin Hall-Volpenhein; Fourth official: Lukasz Szpala
Note: Match will be played without spectators.

August 24 7	New York City FC	1–0	Columbus Crew SC	New York, NY
7:00 PM EDT	Héber (yellow card) 22'; Ring 59'; Medina (yellow card) 67'	Report		Stadium: Yankee Stadium; Attendance: 0 Referee: Nima Saghafi; Assistant referees: Jose Da Silva; Gjovalin Bori; Fourth official: Kevin Broadley

August 29 8	FC Cincinnati	0–0	Columbus Crew SC	Cincinnati, OH
7:30 PM EDT	van der Werff (yellow card) 4'; Gyau (yellow card) 11'; Kubo (yellow card) 89'	Report	Artur (yellow card) 43'; Williams (yellow card) 74'	Stadium: Nippert Stadium; Attendance: 0 Referee: Ted Unkel; Assistant referees: Cory Richardson; Benjamin Hall-Volpenhein; Fourth official: Robert Sibiga

September 2 9	Columbus Crew SC	1–0	Philadelphia Union	Columbus, OH
7:30 PM EDT	Mensah (yellow card) 52'; Zelarayán 55'	Report	Monteiro (yellow card) 42'; Bedoya (yellow card) 54'	Stadium: MAPFRE Stadium; Attendance: 0 Referee: Robert Sibiga; Assistant referees: Matt Nelson; C.J. Morgante; Fourth official: Victor Rivas

September 6 10	Columbus Crew SC	3–0	FC Cincinnati	Columbus, OH
7:30 PM EDT	Santos 52'; Zardes 64', 71', (yellow card) 82'	Report	Amaya (yellow card) 39'; van der Werff (yellow card) 70'; Waston (yellow card) 90'	Stadium: MAPFRE Stadium; Attendance: 1,500; Referee: Guido Gonzales Jr. Assistant referees: Brian Dunn; Gjovalin Bori; Fourth official: Lukasz Szpala

September 12 11	Chicago Fire FC	2–2	Columbus Crew SC	Chicago, IL
7:30 PM EDT	Mihailovic 11'; Berić 14'; Medrán (yellow card) 27'; Navarro (yellow card) 34'; Herbers (yellow card) 56'; Calvo (yellow card) 71'; Bornstein (yellow card) 73'	Report	Mensah (yellow card) 37'; Alashe 68'; Afful (yellow card) 70'; Zardes 88'	Stadium: Soldier Field; Attendance: 0 Referee: Jon Freemon; Assistant referees: Peter Manikowski; Ian McKay; Fourth official: Fotis Bazakos

September 19 12	Columbus Crew SC	2–0	Nashville SC	Columbus, OH
7:30 PM EDT	Alashe (yellow card) 26'; Santos (yellow card) 27', (goal) 50'; Keita (yellow card) 57'; Zardes 90+3'	Report	Lovitz (yellow card) 37'; Muyl (yellow card) 71'; Godoy (yellow card) 76'	Stadium: MAPFRE Stadium; Attendance: 1,500; Referee: Silviu Petrescu; Assistant referees: Andrew Bigelow; Matt Nelson; Fourth official: Calin Radosav

September 23 13	Columbus Crew SC	2–1	Minnesota United FC	Columbus, OH
7:30 PM EDT	Zelarayán 31'; Santos 70'; Artur (yellow card) 90'	Report	Aja (yellow card) 50'; Métanire (yellow card) 61'; Gasper (yellow card) 80'; Lod 88'	Stadium: MAPFRE Stadium; Attendance: 1,455; Referee: Ismail Elfath; Assistant referees: Corey Parker; C.J. Morgante; Fourth official: Elvis Osmanovic

September 27 14	Toronto FC	3–1	Columbus Crew SC	East Hartford, CT
7:30 PM EDT	Altidore (yellow card) 28', (goal) 48'; Pozuelo 59'; Laryea 76'; Delgado (yellow card) 86'	Report	Mavinga 40' (o.g.); Zelarayán (yellow card) 60'; Morris (yellow card) 67'	Stadium: Pratt & Whitney Stadium; Attendance: 0 Referee: Timothy Ford; Assistant referees: Brian Dunn; T.J. Zablocki; Fourth official: Thomas Snyder

October 3 15	FC Dallas	2–2	Columbus Crew SC	Frisco, TX
8:30 PM EDT	Barrios 38'; Ziegler 53' (pen.); Acosta (yellow card) 78'	Report	Afful (yellow card) 23'; Mokhtar 47'; Room (yellow card) 52'; Santos 62'; Díaz (yellow card) 84'	Stadium: Toyota Stadium; Attendance: 3,572; Referee: Ted Unkel; Assistant referees: Frank Anderson; Jeremy Kieso; Fourth official: Elton Garcia

October 7 16	Columbus Crew SC	1–2	Montreal Impact	Columbus, OH
7:30 PM EDT	Afful (yellow card) 24'; Zardes 45'	Report	Lappalainen 24'; Raitala (yellow card) 42'; Corrales (yellow card) 52'; Binks (yellow card) 54'; Bojan 74' (pen.)	Stadium: MAPFRE Stadium; Attendance: 1,401; Referee: Victor Rivas; Assistant referees: Peter Balciunas; C.J. Morgante; Fourth official: Lukasz Szpala

October 14 17	FC Cincinnati	2–1	Columbus Crew SC	Cincinnati, OH
7:30 PM EDT	Gutman (yellow card) 7'; Kubo 17' (pen.); Hagglund 49'	Report	Alashe (yellow card) 31'; Mensah (yellow card) 37'; Santos 45' (pen.); Boateng (yellow card) 45+2'; Morris (yellow card) 90+3'	Stadium: Nippert Stadium; Attendance: 0 Referee: Rubiel Vazquez; Assistant referees: Peter Balciunas; Cory Richardson; Fourth official: Lukasz Szpala

October 18 18	Columbus Crew SC	3–1	New York City FC	Columbus, OH
7:30 PM EDT	Artur 26'; Santos 50'; Díaz (yellow card) 82'; Zardes 90+3'	Report	Ring (yellow card) 10'; Castellanos 55', (yellow card) 84'; Chanot (yellow card) 90+1'	Stadium: MAPFRE Stadium; Attendance: 0 Referee: Alex Chilowicz; Assistant referees: Peter Manikowski; Peter Balciunas; Fourth official: Guido Gonzalez Jr.

October 24 19	Houston Dynamo	1–1	Columbus Crew SC	Houston, TX
8:00 PM EDT	Rodríguez (yellow card) 22', (goal) 37'; Vera (yellow card) 42'	Report	Afful (yellow card) 32'; Cabrera 67' (o.g.); Morris (yellow card) 84'; Díaz (yellow card) 90+1'	Stadium: BBVA Stadium; Attendance: 2,237; Referee: Joseph Dickerson; Assistant referees: Chris Elliott; Kevin Lock; Fourth official: Elijio Arreguin

October 28 20	D.C. United	1–0	Columbus Crew SC	Washington, D.C.
9:00 PM EDT	Gressel 32'; Mora (yellow card) 14'; Brillant (yellow card) 17'; Sorga (yellow card) 65'; Fisher (yellow card) 74'	Report	Berhalter (yellow card) 6'; Boateng (yellow card) 88'; Cadden (yellow card) 90+4'	Stadium: Audi Field; Attendance: 0 Referee: Silviu Petrescu; Assistant referees: Brian Poeschel; Matt Nelson; Fourth official: Sergii Demianchuk

November 1 21	Columbus Crew SC	2–1	Philadelphia Union	Columbus, OH
3:30 PM EST	Artur 37'; Valenzuela (yellow card) 71'; Németh 84'	Report	Monteiro 57' (pen.); Glesnes (yellow card) 72'	Stadium: MAPFRE Stadium; Attendance: 1,500; Referee: Allen Chapman; Assistant referees: Andrew Bigelow; Ian McKay; Fourth official: Lukasz Szpala

November 4 22	Orlando City SC	2–1	Columbus Crew SC	Orlando, FL
7:30 PM EST	Mueller 27'; Nani (red card) 52'; Jansson (yellow card) 56'; Pereyra (yellow card) 64'; Michel 83'; Gallese (yellow card) 90+4'	Report	Afful 56'; Santos (yellow card) 81'	Stadium: Exploria Stadium; Referee: Ramy Touchan; Assistant referees: Logan Brown; Gjovalin Bori; Fourth official: Elvis Osmanovic
Note: Rescheduled from original October 11 match.

November 8 23	Columbus Crew SC	2–1	Atlanta United FC	Columbus, OH
3:30 PM EST	Zelarayán (yellow card) 17', (goal) 28'; Zardes 55'; Valenzuela (yellow card) 59'; Nagbe (yellow card) 90+5'	Report	Escobar (yellow card) 11' (yellow-red card) 90+1'; Moreno 59' (pen.); Barco (yellow card) 88'; Guzan (yellow card) 90+6'	Stadium: MAPFRE Stadium; Attendance: 1,500; Referee: Ismail Elfath; Assistant referees: Corey Parker; Cory Richardson; Fourth official: Sergii Demianchuk

=== MLS is Back Tournament ===
Group E results
Pos	Team	Pld	W	D	L	GF	GA	GD	Pts	Qualification
1	Columbus Crew SC	3	3	0	0	7	0	+7	9	Advanced to knockout stage
2	FC Cincinnati	3	2	0	1	3	4	−1	6	Advanced to knockout stage
3	New York Red Bulls	3	1	0	2	1	4	−3	3	
4	Atlanta United	3	0	0	3	0	3	−3	0	

Source: MLS

July 11 3 Group E	FC Cincinnati	0–4	Columbus Crew SC	Bay Lake, FL
10:30 PM EDT	Amaya (yellow card) 44'; Alashe (yellow card) 82'	Report	Zelarayán 27'; Zardes 30', 49'; Mokhtar 60'; Mensah (yellow card) 87'	Stadium: ESPN Wide World of Sports Complex; Referee: Ismail Elfath; Assistant referees: Andrew Bigelow; Cory Richardson; Fourth official: Ramy Touchan
Note: Group stage matches will count toward the MLS regular season standings.

July 16 4 Group E	Columbus Crew SC	2–0	New York Red Bulls	Bay Lake, FL
10:30 PM EDT	Zardes 22'; Zelarayán 47'; Room (yellow card) 89'; Mokhtar (yellow card) 90+2'	Report	Tarek (yellow card) 61'; Duncan (yellow card) 90+3'	Stadium: ESPN Wide World of Sports Complex; Referee: Ramy Touchan; Assistant referees: Chris Wattam; Claudiu Badea; Fourth official: Ismail Elfath
Note: Group stage matches will count toward the MLS regular season standings.

July 21 5 Group E	Atlanta United FC	0–1	Columbus Crew SC	Bay Lake, FL
8:00 PM EDT	Escobar (yellow card) 45+4'; Robinson (yellow card) 73'	Report	Mokhtar 18'; Valenzuela (yellow card) 25'; Santos (yellow card) 60'; Jiménez (yellow card) 85'; Díaz (yellow card) 90+3'	Stadium: ESPN Wide World of Sports Complex; Referee: Timothy Ford; Assistant referees: Andrew Bigelow; Jason White; Fourth official: Allen Chapman
Note: Group stage matches will count toward the MLS regular season standings.

July 28 Round of 16	Columbus Crew SC	1–1 (3–5 p)	Minnesota United FC	Bay Lake, FL
8:00 PM EDT	Zardes 79'; Mensah (yellow card) 84'	Report	Lod 18'	Stadium: ESPN Wide World of Sports Complex; Referee: Allen Chapman; Assistant referees: Jason White; Cory Richardson; Fourth official: Victor Rivas
	Penalties
	Adi (penalty scored); Santos (penalty scored); Cadden (penalty missed); Zelarayán (penalty scored)		(penalty scored) Alonso; (penalty scored) Greguš; (penalty scored) Schoenfeld; (penalty scored) Edwards; (penalty scored) Gasper

=== MLS Cup Playoffs ===
==== First Round ====
November 21 First Round	Columbus Crew SC	3–2	New York Red Bulls	Columbus, OH
3:00 PM EST	Santos 26' (pen.); Nagbe 46'; Zardes 68'	Report	Clark 23'; Davis (yellow card) 40'; Duncan (yellow card) 81'; Long (yellow card) 89'; White 90'	Stadium: MAPFRE Stadium; Attendance: 0 Referee: Alex Chilowicz; Assistant referees: Brian Poeschel; Eric Weisbrod; Fourth official: Fotis Bazakos

==== Conference Semifinals ====
November 29 Conference Semifinals	Columbus Crew SC	2–0 (a.e.t.)	Nashville SC	Columbus, OH
8:00 PM EST	Santos 99'; Zardes 103'	Report	Johnston (yellow card) 42'; Washington (yellow card) 111'	Stadium: MAPFRE Stadium; Attendance: 0 Referee: Armando Villarreal; Assistant referees: Andrew Bigelow; Cory Richardson; Fourth official: Nima Saghafi

==== Conference Finals ====
December 6 Conference Finals	Columbus Crew SC	1–0	New England Revolution	Columbus, OH
4:00 PM EST	Artur 59'; Santos (yellow card) 90+3'	Report		Stadium: MAPFRE Stadium; Attendance: 1,500; Referee: Armando Villarreal; Assistant referees: Frank Anderson; Eric Weisbrod; Fourth official: Robert Sibiga

==== MLS Cup ====
December 12 MLS Cup	Columbus Crew SC	3–0	Seattle Sounders FC	Columbus, OH
8:30 PM EST	Zelarayán 25', 82'; Etienne 31'	Report	João Paulo (yellow card) 27'; Smith (yellow card) 49'	Stadium: MAPFRE Stadium; Attendance: 1,500; Referee: Jair Marrufo; Assistant referees: Corey Parker; Kathryn Nesbitt; Fourth official: Alex Chilowicz

=== U.S. Open Cup ===
The 2020 edition of the U.S. Open Cup was canceled on August 17 due to concerns about the COVID-19 pandemic.

== Statistics ==
=== Appearances and goals ===
Under "Apps" for each section, the first number represents the number of starts, and the second number represents appearances as a substitute.

No.	Pos	Nat	Player	Total		MLS (Note: MLS counted the three group stage games of the MLS is Back Tournament as regular season matches)		MLS is Back Knockout Stage		MLS Cup Playoffs	
No.	Pos	Nat	Player	Apps	Goals	Apps	Goals	Apps	Goals	Apps	Goals
1	GK	(Curaçao) CUW	Eloy Room	19	0	17+0	0	0+0	0	2+0	0
2	DF	(Scotland) SCO	Chris Cadden	10	0	3+5	0	0+1	0	0+1	0
3	DF	(United States) USA	Josh Williams	16	0	11+1	0	0+0	0	4+0	0
4	DF	(Ghana) GHA	Jonathan Mensah	28	0	23+0	0	1+0	0	4+0	0
5	DF	(Netherlands) NED	Vito Wormgoor	2	0	2+0	0	0+0	0	0+0	0
6	MF	(United States) USA	Darlington Nagbe	19	2	14+1	1	1+0	0	3+0	1
7	MF	(Portugal) POR	Pedro Santos	26	8	22+0	6	1+0	0	3+0	2
8	MF	(Brazil) BRA	Artur	27	3	20+2	2	1+0	0	4+0	1
9	FW	(Nigeria) NGR	Fanendo Adi	12	0	1+10	0	0+1	0	0+0	0
10	MF	(Armenia) ARM	Lucas Zelarayán	21	8	12+4	6	1+0	0	4+0	2
11	FW	(United States) USA	Gyasi Zardes	26	15	20+1	12	1+0	1	4+0	2
12	MF	(Costa Rica) CRC	Luis Díaz	26	0	14+7	0	1+0	0	3+1	0
13	GK	(United States) USA	Andrew Tarbell	10	0	6+1	0	1+0	0	2+0	0
14	DF	(Costa Rica) CRC	Waylon Francis	5	0	2+2	0	0+0	0	0+1	0
16	MF	(United States) USA	Hector Jiménez	10	0	4+4	0	0+1	0	0+1	0
17	FW	(Canada) CAN	Jordan Hamilton	2	0	0+2	0	0+0	0	0+0	0
18	MF	(United States) USA	Sebastian Berhalter	9	0	4+5	0	0+0	0	0+0	0
19	DF	(Argentina) ARG	Milton Valenzuela	24	0	17+2	0	1+0	0	4+0	0
20	FW	(Ghana) GHA	Emmanuel Boateng	12	0	3+7	0	0+0	0	0+2	0
21	MF	(United States) USA	Aidan Morris	11	0	2+8	0	0+0	0	1+0	0
22	MF	(Haiti) HAI	Derrick Etienne Jr.	24	2	8+13	1	0+1	0	2+0	1
23	DF	(United States) USA	Grant Lillard	0	0	0+0	0	0+0	0	0+0	0
24	GK	(United States) USA	Jon Kempin	0	0	0+0	0	0+0	0	0+0	0
25	DF	(Ghana) GHA	Harrison Afful	26	1	20+1	1	1+0	0	4+0	0
26	MF	(United States) USA	Fatai Alashe	9	1	6+2	1	0+0	0	0+1	0
27	FW	(Spain) ESP	Miguel Berry	0	0	0+0	0	0+0	0	0+0	0
28	GK	(United States) USA	Matt Lampson	0	0	0+0	0	0+0	0	0+0	0
29	FW	(Hungary) HUN	Krisztián Németh	5	1	2+2	1	0+0	0	0+1	0
30	DF	(United States) USA	Aboubacar Keita	12	0	10+1	0	1+0	0	0+0	0
34	MF	(Morocco) MAR	Youness Mokhtar	19	3	10+9	3	0+0	0	0+0	0
			Own goal	0	2	-	2	-	0	-	0
Players who left Columbus during the season:
44	DF	(Sweden) SWE	Axel Sjoberg	0	0	0+0	0	0+0	0	0+0	0

Source: Columbus stats

=== Disciplinary record ===
No.	Pos.	Name	MLS		MLS is Back Knockout stage		2020 MLS Cup Playoffs		Total	
No.	Pos.	Name	Yellow card	Red card	Yellow card	Red card	Yellow card	Red card	Yellow card	Red card
1	GK	(Curaçao) Eloy Room	2	0	0	0	0	0	2	0
2	DF	(Scotland) Chris Cadden	1	0	0	0	0	0	1	0
3	DF	(United States) Josh Williams	1	0	0	0	0	0	1	0
4	DF	(Ghana) Jonathan Mensah	4	0	1	0	0	0	5	0
5	DF	(Netherlands) Vito Wormgoor	1	0	0	0	0	0	1	0
6	MF	(United States) Darlington Nagbe	1	0	0	0	0	0	1	0
7	MF	(Portugal) Pedro Santos	4	0	0	0	1	0	5	0
8	MF	(Brazil) Artur	3	0	0	0	0	0	3	0
9	FW	(Nigeria) Fanendo Adi	0	0	0	0	0	0	0	0
10	MF	(Armenia) Lucas Zelarayán	2	0	0	0	0	0	2	0
11	FW	(United States) Gyasi Zardes	1	0	0	0	0	0	1	0
12	MF	(Costa Rica) Luis Díaz	5	0	0	0	0	0	5	0
13	GK	(United States) Andrew Tarbell	0	0	0	0	0	0	0	0
14	DF	(Costa Rica) Waylon Francis	0	0	0	0	0	0	0	0
16	MF	(United States) Hector Jiménez	1	0	0	0	0	0	1	0
17	FW	(United States) Jordan Hamilton	0	0	0	0	0	0	0	0
18	MF	(United States) Sebastian Berhalter	1	0	0	0	0	0	1	0
19	DF	(Argentina) Milton Valenzuela	4	0	0	0	0	0	4	0
20	FW	(Ghana) Emmanuel Boateng	2	0	0	0	0	0	2	0
21	MF	(United States) Aidan Morris	3	0	0	0	0	0	3	0
22	MF	(Haiti) Derrick Etienne Jr.	0	0	0	0	0	0	0	0
23	DF	(United States) Grant Lillard	0	0	0	0	0	0	0	0
24	GK	(United States) Jon Kempin	0	0	0	0	0	0	0	0
25	DF	(Ghana) Harrison Afful	5	0	0	0	0	0	5	0
26	MF	(United States) Fatai Alashe	2	0	0	0	0	0	2	0
27	FW	(Spain) Miguel Berry	0	0	0	0	0	0	0	0
28	FW	(United States) Matt Lampson	0	0	0	0	0	0	0	0
29	FW	(Hungary) Krisztián Németh	0	0	0	0	0	0	0	0
30	DF	(United States) Aboubacar Keita	1	0	0	0	0	0	1	0
34	MF	(Morocco) Youness Mokhtar	1	0	0	0	0	0	1	0
Players who left Columbus during the season:
44	DF	(Sweden) Axel Sjöberg	0	0	0	0	0	0	0	0

Source: Columbus stats

=== Clean sheets ===
No.	Name	MLS	MLS is Back Knockout stage	MLS Cup Playoffs	Total	Games Played
1	(Curaçao) Eloy Room	7	0	1	8	18
13	(United States) Andrew Tarbell	2	0	2	4	9
24	(United States) Jon Kempin	0	0	0	0	0
28	(United States) Matt Lampson	0	0	0	0	0

Source: Columbus stats

== Transfers ==
=== In ===
Pos.	Player	Transferred from	Fee/notes	Date	Source
MF	(United States) Aidan Morris	(United States) Indiana	Signed to Homegrown Player deal.	January 14, 2020	
MF	(United States) Sebastian Berhalter	(United States) North Carolina	Signed to Homegrown Player deal.	January 17, 2020	
FW	(Nigeria) Fanendo Adi	(United States) FC Cincinnati	Picked up off waivers	January 27, 2020	
MF	(Haiti) Derrick Etienne Jr.	(United States) New York Red Bulls	Signed as a free agent	February 4, 2020	
GK	(United States) Andrew Tarbell	(United States) San Jose Earthquakes	Traded for $75,000 in general allocation money	February 19, 2020	
FW	(Spain) Miguel Berry	(United States) San Diego	Drafted in the first round of the 2020 MLS SuperDraft	February 27, 2020	
MF	(Ghana) Emmanuel Boateng	(United States) DC United	Traded for Axel Sjöberg	August 14, 2020	
DF	(United States) Grant Lillard	(United States) Inter Miami CF	Traded for a third round draft pick in the 2021 MLS SuperDraft	August 14, 2020	
DF	(United States) Fatai Alashe	(United States) FC Cincinnati	Traded for a second round draft pick in the 2021 MLS SuperDraft. FC Cincinnati will instead receive $50,000 of 2021 general allocation money should certain performance conditions be met.	August 17, 2020	
FW	(Hungary) Krisztián Németh	(Slovakia) Dunajská Streda	Signed as free agent	October 5, 2020	
GK	(United States) Evan Bush	(Canada) Vancouver Whitecaps FC	Traded for $125,000 in general allocation money	December 14, 2020	
FW	(England) Bradley Wright-Phillips	(United States) Los Angeles FC	Signed as a free agent	December 23, 2020	

=== Out ===
Pos.	Player	Transferred to	Fee/notes	Date	Source
MF	(United States) Wil Trapp	(United States) Inter Miami CF	Traded for $100,000 in general allocation money and a 2020 international roster slot	January 31, 2020	
FW	(United States) JJ Williams	(United States) Birmingham Legion	Placed on waivers	February 20, 2020	
MF	(Sweden) Axel Sjöberg	(United States) DC United	Traded for Emmanuel Boateng	August 14, 2020	
GK	(United States) Andrew Tarbell	(United States) Austin FC	Option declined	December 14, 2020	
MF	(United States) Fatai Alashe	(United States) Sacramento Republic	Option declined	December 14, 2020	
MF	(Ghana) Emmanuel Boateng	(United States) New England Revolution	Option declined	December 14, 2020	
MF	(Morocco) Youness Mokhtar	(Netherlands) ADO Den Haag	Option declined	December 14, 2020	
FW	(Canada) Jordan Hamilton	(United States) Indy Eleven	Option declined	December 14, 2020	
FW	(Hungary) Krisztián Németh	(Hungary) Debreceni VSC	Option declined	December 14, 2020	
DF	(Costa Rica) Waylon Francis	(United States) Columbus Crew SC	Contract expired	December 14, 2020	
MF	(United States) Hector Jiménez	(United States) Austin FC	Contract expired	December 14, 2020	
FW	(Nigeria) Fanendo Adi	(United States) Minnesota United FC	Contract expired	December 14, 2020	

=== Loan out ===
Pos.	Player	Loanee club	Length/Notes	Beginning	End	Source
GK	(United States) Jon Kempin	(United States) San Diego Loyal SC	Option to Recall	March 6, 2020	September 19, 2020	
FW	(Spain) Miguel Berry	(United States) San Diego Loyal SC	Option to Recall	August 28, 2020	September 23, 2020	

=== MLS Draft picks ===
Draft picks are not automatically signed to the team roster. Only those who are signed to a contract will be listed as transfers in. The picks for Columbus Crew SC are listed below:

2020 Columbus Crew SC SuperDraft Picks
Round	Pick	Player	Position	College
1	7	(Spain) Miguel Berry	FW	San Diego
2	47	(Austria) Remi Prieur	GK	St. Mary's
2	49	(United States) Danny Griffin	MF	Providence

2020 Columbus Crew SC Re-Entry Draft Picks
Stage	Round	Pick	Player	Position	Team
2	1	26	(United States) Eric Dick	GK	Sporting Kansas City

== Awards ==
MLS Team of the Week
Week	Starters	Bench	Opponent(s)	Link
1		(Armenia) Lucas Zelarayán	(United States) New York City FC	
2		(Brazil) Artur	(United States) Seattle Sounders FC	
MLS is Back – Round 1	(United States) Darlington Nagbe (Armenia) Lucas Zelarayán (United States) Gyasi Zardes		(United States) FC Cincinnati	
MLS is Back – Round 2	(United States) Darlington Nagbe (Ghana) Jonathan Mensah	(Armenia) Lucas Zelarayán	(United States) New York Red Bulls	
MLS is Back – Round 3		(United States) Darlington Nagbe	(United States) Atlanta United FC	
6	(United States) Darlington Nagbe	(Haiti) Derrick Etienne Jr.	(United States) Chicago Fire FC	
9		(Armenia) Lucas Zelarayán	(United States) Philadelphia Union	
10	(United States) Gyasi Zardes		(United States) FC Cincinnati	
11	(United States) Gyasi Zardes		(United States) Chicago Fire FC	
12	(Ghana) Jonathan Mensah		(United States) Nashville SC	
13	(Portugal) Pedro Santos (Armenia) Lucas Zelarayán		(United States) Minnesota United FC	
19	(United States) Andrew Tarbell	(Portugal) Pedro Santos (Brazil) Artur	(United States) New York City FC	
22	(Curaçao) Eloy Room	(Brazil) Artur	(United States) Philadelphia Union	

=== MLS Player of the Week ===
Week	Player	Opponent	Link
MLS Cup 2020	(Armenia) Lucas Zelarayán	Seattle Sounders FC	

=== MLS Goal of the Week ===
Week	Player	Opponent	Link
MLS is Back – Round 1	(Armenia) Lucas Zelarayán	FC Cincinnati	

=== Postseason ===
MLS Newcomer of the Year Award

- MF Lucas Zelarayán

MLS Goal of the Year Award

- MF Darlington Nagbe

MLS Save of the Year Award

- GK Eloy Room

MLS Best XI

- DF Jonathan Mensah

=== Crew SC Team Awards ===
- Most Valuable Player – Lucas Zelarayán
- Golden Boot Winner – Gyasi Zardes
- Defender of the Year – Jonathan Mensah
- Kirk Urso Heart Award – Darlington Nagbe
- Humanitarian of the Year – Black Players for Change (Jonathan Mensah and Darlington Nagbe accepting on behalf of the organization)
- Academy Player of the Year – TJ Presthus

== Kits ==
Home	Away

Type	Shirt	Shorts	Socks	First appearance / Record
Home	Gold	Gold	Gold	Match 1 vs. NYCFC
Away	Black	Black	Black	Match 2 vs. Seattle
