= 2018 Mobile Mini Sun Cup =

Tournament details
- Host country: United States
- Dates: February 3–24
- Teams: 14
- Venue(s): 2 (in 2 host cities)

Final positions
- Champions: New England Revolution
- Runners-up: Houston Dynamo
- Third place: Portland Timbers
- Fourth place: Sporting Kansas City

Tournament statistics
- Matches played: 15
- Goals scored: 51 (3.4 per match)
- Top scorer(s): Samuel Armenteros (Portland Timbers) (4 Goals)
- Best player(s): Diego Fagúndez (New England Revolution)

The 2018 Mobile Mini Sun Cup was the eighth edition of the preseason exhibition soccer tournament and the first under its new name and sponsor. It was held from February 3 to February 24 in Tucson and Phoenix, Arizona. The defending champions were the Houston Dynamo.

== Teams ==
The following clubs entered the tournament:

Major League Soccer

- Colorado Rapids (fifth appearance)
- FC Dallas (first appearance)
- Houston Dynamo (third appearance)
- New England Revolution (seventh appearance)
- New York Red Bulls (fifth appearance)
- Portland Timbers (first appearance)
- Seattle Sounders FC (third appearance)
- Sporting Kansas City (fifth appearance)

United Soccer League

- San Antonio FC (first appearance)
- Phoenix Rising FC (second appearance)

== Table standings ==
Pos	Team	Pld	W	D	L	GF	GA	GD	Pts
1	Houston Dynamo	3	2	1	0	7	1	+6	7
2	New England Revolution	3	1	2	0	7	6	+1	5
3	Portland Timbers	3	1	1	1	6	4	+2	4
4	Sporting Kansas City	3	1	1	1	4	4	0	4
5	New York Red Bulls	4	1	1	2	5	12	−7	4
6	Colorado Rapids	1	1	0	0	2	0	+2	3
7	Seattle Sounders FC	1	1	0	0	2	1	+1	3
8	FC Dallas	1	0	1	0	2	2	0	1
9	San Antonio FC	1	0	1	0	3	3	0	1
10	Phoenix Rising FC	4	0	0	4	3	8	−5	0

== Matches ==
February 3	Seattle Sounders FC	2–1	Portland Timbers	Tucson, Arizona
18:00 MST	Roldan 9'; Bwana 67'	Report; Report	Valeri 24'	Stadium: Kino North Stadium; Attendance: 2,931

February 10	Phoenix Rising FC	2–3	New York Red Bulls	Phoenix, Arizona
19:00 MST	Collin 7' (o.g.); Frater 75'	Report; Report	Muyl 37'; Bezecourt 90'; Escobar 90+1'	Stadium: Phoenix Rising FC Soccer Complex; Attendance: 6,620

February 14	New England Revolution	2–2	FC Dallas	Tucson, Arizona
11:00 MST	Penilla 55'; Fagúndez 85'	Report; Report	Diaz 15'; Urruti 77'	Stadium: Kino North Stadium

February 14	Portland Timbers	1–1	Houston Dynamo	Tucson, Arizona
14:00 MST	Asprilla 33'	Report; Report	Álvarez 12'	Stadium: Kino North Stadium

February 14	Sporting Kansas City	1–1	New York Red Bulls	Tucson, Arizona
17:00 MST	Hernandez 77'	Report; Report	Wright-Phillips 15'	Stadium: Kino North Stadium

February 14	Phoenix Rising FC	0–2	Colorado Rapids	Phoenix, Arizona
18:00 MST		Report; Report	Badji 75'; Smith 80'	Stadium: Phoenix Rising FC Soccer Complex; Attendance: 3,418

February 17	Phoenix Rising FC	1–2	Sporting Kansas City	Phoenix, Arizona
15:00 MST	Frater 5'	Report; Report	Sánchez 17'; Sallói 30'	Stadium: Phoenix Rising FC Soccer Complex; Attendance: 5,060

February 17	New England Revolution	3–3	San Antonio FC	Tucson, Arizona
16:00 MST	Bunbury 22', 41'; Delamea 44'	Report	Player X 12'; Guzmán 59', 61'	Stadium: Kino North Stadium

February 17	Houston Dynamo	5–0	New York Red Bulls	Tucson, Arizona
18:15 MST	García 30'; Wenger 40'; Manotas 55'; Steeves 78', 83'	Report; Report		Stadium: Kino North Stadium

February 21	New England Revolution	2–1	Sporting Kansas City	Tucson, Arizona
11:00 MST	Dick 13' (o.g.); Rowe 36'	Report; Report	Rubio 21' (pen.)	Stadium: Kino North Stadium

February 21	Portland Timbers	4–1	New York Red Bulls	Tucson, Arizona
14:00 MST	Polo 10'; Armenteros 12'; Arboleda 60'; Cascante 89'	Report; Report	Andriuškevičius 69' (o.g.)	Stadium: Kino North Stadium

February 21	Houston Dynamo	1–0	Phoenix Rising FC	Tucson, Arizona
17:00 MST	Álvarez 41'	Report; Report		Stadium: Kino North Stadium

=== Finals ===
February 24 5th Place Game	Phoenix Rising FC	2–1	New York Red Bulls	Tucson, Arizona
14:00 MST	da Fonte (yellow card) 8'; Asante 28'; Mala (red card) 47'; Drogba 54' (pen.); Fernandez (yellow card) 68'	Report; Report	Stevens (yellow card) 8'; White 65'	Stadium: Kino North Stadium

February 24 3rd Place Game	Portland Timbers	3–2	Sporting Kansas City	Tucson, Arizona
16:00 MST	Mabiala (yellow card) 29'; Powell (yellow card) 31'; Ridgewell (yellow card) 38'; Armenteros 53', 58'; Paredes 77'	Report; Report	Espinoza 27'; Rubio (yellow card) 45+1' (goal) 52'	Stadium: Kino North Stadium

February 24 Championship Game	New England Revolution	1–1 (4–3 p)	Houston Dynamo	Tucson, Arizona
18:15 MST	Farrell (yellow card) 40'; Németh 47'; Delamea (yellow card) 58'	Report	García (red card) 43'; Elis (yellow card) 45+2' (goal) 67' (pen.); Leonardo (yellow card) 85'
	Penalties
	Rowe (penalty missed); Caldwell (penalty scored); Bunbury (penalty scored); Tierney (penalty scored); Németh (penalty scored)		(penalty scored) Rodriguez; (penalty scored) Cerén; (penalty scored) Martínez; (penalty missed) Álvarez; (penalty missed) Elis
