= 2019 Mobile Mini Sun Cup =

Tournament details
- Host country: United States
- Dates: February 2–23
- Teams: 11
- Venues: 3 (in 3 host cities)

Final positions
- Champions: FC Dallas
- Runners-up: Portland Timbers
- Third place: New York Red Bulls
- Fourth place: Real Salt Lake

Tournament statistics
- Matches played: 9
- Goals scored: 31 (3.44 per match)
- Top scorer(s): Jeremy Ebobisse (POR) (3 goals)
- Best player: Jesús Ferreira (FCD)

The 2019 Mobile Mini Sun Cup was the ninth edition of the preseason exhibition soccer tournament among Major League Soccer (MLS) and United Soccer League (USL) teams. It was held from February 2 to February 23 in Oro Valley, Tucson and Phoenix, Arizona.

== Teams ==
The following clubs entered the tournament:

Major League Soccer

- FC Dallas (second appearance)
- Houston Dynamo (fourth appearance)
- Minnesota United FC (first appearance)
- New York Red Bulls (sixth appearance)
- Portland Timbers (second appearance)
- Real Salt Lake (sixth appearance)
- Seattle Sounders FC (fourth appearance)
- Sporting Kansas City (sixth appearance)

USL Championship

- Oklahoma City Energy (first appearance)
- Phoenix Rising FC (third appearance)

== Cup matches ==
All times are Mountain Standard Time (UTC-07:00)

February 10	New York Red Bulls	5–1	Phoenix Rising FC	Oro Valley, Arizona
1:00pm	Wright-Phillips 6', 38', 63'; Kaku 40'; Muyl 56'	Report; Report	Spencer 42'	Stadium: Naranja Park

February 13	Portland Timbers	2–1	Seattle Sounders FC	Tucson, Arizona
7:00pm	Valeri 40' (pen.); Ebobisse 88'	Report	Bwana 33'	Stadium: Kino North Stadium

February 14	New York Red Bulls	canceled	Real Salt Lake	Tucson, Arizona
1:00pm				Stadium: Kino North Stadium

February 16	FC Dallas	2–1	Seattle Sounders FC	Tucson, Arizona
10:00am	Badji 34'; Roberts 68'	Report; Report	Tolo 90'	Stadium: Kino North Stadium

February 16	New York Red Bulls	2–2	Portland Timbers	Tucson, Arizona
7:00pm	White 13'; Nealis 35'	Report	Ebobisse 62'; Valeri 70' (pen.)	Stadium: Kino North Stadium

February 16	Real Salt Lake	4–1	Phoenix Rising FC	Scottsdale, Arizona
7:00pm	Kreilach 11', 42'; Lennon 62' (pen.); Savarino 74'	Report; Report	Jahn 2'	Stadium: Phoenix Rising Soccer Complex; Attendance: 5,867

February 20	FC Dallas	2–1	Real Salt Lake	Tucson, Arizona
12:00pm	Ferreira 74'; Mosquera 62' (pen.)	Report	Saucedo 22'	Stadium: Kino North Stadium

February 20	Phoenix Rising FC	1–0	Portland Timbers	Tucson, Arizona
6:00pm	Dia (yellow card) 71'; Jahn 87'; Mala (red card) 90'	Report; Report	Dielna (yellow card) 70'; Blanco (red card) 90'	Stadium: Kino North Stadium

February 23	FC Dallas	2–1	New York Red Bulls	Tucson, Arizona
12:00pm	Aránguiz 34' (pen.); Ferreira 77'	Report	Lema 22'; Nuhu (yellow card) 33'	Stadium: Kino North Stadium; Referee: Nema Saghafi

February 23	Portland Timbers	3–0	Real Salt Lake	Tucson, Arizona
5:00pm	Ebobisse 5'; Blanco 44'; Chará (yellow card) 65'; Polo 72'; Valeri (yellow card) 74'	Report	Beckerman (yellow card) 68'	Stadium: Kino North Stadium

== Table standings ==
Pos	Club	GP	W	L	T	GF	GA	GD	Pts	PPG
1	FC Dallas (C)	3	3	0	0	6	3	+3	9	3.00
2	Portland Timbers	4	2	1	1	7	4	+3	7	1.75
3	New York Red Bulls	3	1	1	1	8	5	+3	4	1.33
4	Real Salt Lake	3	1	2	0	5	6	-1	3	1.00
5	Phoenix Rising FC	3	1	2	0	3	9	-6	3	1.00
6	Seattle Sounders FC	2	0	2	0	2	4	-2	0	0.00

(C) - Cup Winner
Note: Standings will be determined by points per game (PPG).

== Exhibition matches ==
February 2	Phoenix Rising FC	0–0	Minnesota United FC	Tucson, Arizona
2:00pm		Report		Stadium: Kino North Stadium

February 6	Minnesota United FC	0–0	Houston Dynamo	Tucson, Arizona
6:00pm				Stadium: Kino North Stadium

February 7	Sporting Kansas City	3–2	Phoenix Rising FC	Scottsdale, Arizona
6:00pm	Russell 56' (1st game); Zusi 72' (1st game); Freeman 1' (2nd game)	Report	Neagle 70' (1st game); Lambert 28' (2nd game)	Stadium: Phoenix Rising Soccer Complex
Note: Two 75 minute games; aggregate score

February 9	Houston Dynamo	3–2	Seattle Sounders FC	Tucson, Arizona
6:00pm	Cabezas 71'; Peña 80'; Hairston 88'	Report	Lodeiro 14'; Ruidíaz 18'	Stadium: Kino North Stadium

February 13	Sporting Kansas City	4–1	Houston Dynamo	Tucson, Arizona
4:00pm	Russell 11'; Gutiérrez 23'; Németh 28', 90+1'	Report	Elis 5'	Stadium: Kino North Stadium

February 13	Houston Dynamo Reserves	1–1	Sporting Kansas City Reserves	Tucson, Arizona
4:00pm	Rodriguez 52'	Report	Croizet 45'	Stadium: Kino North Stadium, Field 1

February 20	New York Red Bulls Reserves	5–2	Phoenix Rising FC	Tucson, Arizona
3:00pm	DeSousa 32'; Stroud 47'; Valot 49'; Barlow 52'; Elney 81'		Johnson 29'; Calistri 67'	Stadium: Kino North Stadium

February 23	OKC Energy FC	2–0	Phoenix Rising FC	Tucson, Arizona
2:45pm	Brown 11'; Gordon 26'	Report	Cochran (yellow card) 51'; Farrell (yellow card) 68'; Flemmings (yellow card) 75'; Musa (red card) 88'	Stadium: Kino North Stadium

Note: Exhibition matches do not count in the cup standings
