= 2012 Desert Diamond Cup =

Tournament details
- Host country: United States
- Dates: February 22 - March 3
- Teams: 4
- Venue(s): 1 (in 1 host city)

Final positions
- Champions: Los Angeles Galaxy (1st title)

Tournament statistics
- Matches played: 8
- Goals scored: 17 (2.13 per match)
- Top scorer(s): (United States) Kelyn Rowe (United States) Mike Magee (2 goals)

2012 Desert Diamond Cup (formerly known as the Desert Cup and also known as the FC Tucson Desert Diamond Cup) is a soccer exhibition featuring four soccer teams from Major League Soccer, held between February 22 – March 3, 2012. The preseason tournament was played at the Kino Sports Complex 11,000 seat main stadium in Tucson, Arizona. This is the 2nd annual Desert Diamond Cup. New York Red Bulls and Sporting Kansas City of Major League Soccer participated in the first tournament in March 2011.

== Teams ==
The following four clubs participated in the 2012 tournament:

- Los Angeles Galaxy (first appearance)
- New England Revolution (first appearance)
- New York Red Bulls (second appearance)
- Real Salt Lake (first appearance)

== Table standings ==
Pos	Team	Pld	W	L	D	GF	GA	GD	Pts
1	New England Revolution	3	3	0	0	7	3	+4	9
2	LA Galaxy	3	1	2	0	5	5	0	3
3	New York Red Bulls	3	1	2	0	2	4	−2	3
4	Real Salt Lake	3	1	2	0	2	4	−2	3

== Matches ==
The tournament featured a round-robin group stage followed by third-place and championship matches.

=== Tournament ===
February 22
17:00 PST

Los Angeles Galaxy	2 – 3	New England Revolution
Buddle 31'; Magee 38'	Report	2' Feilhaber; 36' Lozano; 74' White

Kino Veterans Memorial Stadium, Tucson, Arizona
Attendance: 5,547
February 22
19:00 PST

Real Salt Lake	1 – 0	New York Red Bulls
Paulo Jr. 75'	Report

Kino Veterans Memorial Stadium, Tucson, Arizona
Attendance: 5,547

February 25
17:00 PST

Los Angeles Galaxy	2 – 0	Real Salt Lake
Cardozo 80'; Magee 86'	Report

Kino Veterans Memorial Stadium, Tucson, Arizona
Attendance: 8,574
Referee: Allen Chapman
February 25
19:00 PST

New England Revolution	2 – 0	New York Red Bulls
Rowe 77', 84'	Report

Kino Veterans Memorial Stadium, Tucson, Arizona
Attendance: 8,574
Referee: Tyler Ploeger

February 29
17:00 PST

Real Salt Lake	1 - 2	New England Revolution
Nico Muniz 11'	Report	Fagundez 8'; Runstrom 56'

Kino Veterans Memorial Stadium, Tucson, Arizona
Attendance: 6,212
Referee: Mark DeClouet
February 29
19:00 PST

Los Angeles Galaxy	1 - 2	New York Red Bulls
Sarvas 78'	Report	Cooper 31'; Henry 62'

Kino Veterans Memorial Stadium, Tucson, Arizona
Attendance: 6,212
Referee: Ismail Elfath

=== Third place match ===
March 3
17:00 PST

New York Red Bulls	0 – 1	Real Salt Lake
	Report	Wingert 28'

Kino Veterans Memorial Stadium, Tucson, Arizona
Referee: Jasen Anno

=== Final ===
March 3
19:00 PST

New England Revolution	0 – 0	Los Angeles Galaxy
	Report
Penalties
Guy (penalty missed); Reis (penalty scored); Joseph (penalty scored); Feilhaber (penalty missed)	2 – 4	(penalty scored) Cardozo; (penalty missed) Stephens; (penalty scored) Jimenez; (penalty scored) Walker; (penalty scored) Sarvas

Kino Veterans Memorial Stadium, Tucson, Arizona
Referee: Kevin Stott

== Final placement ==
#	Team
1	Los Angeles Galaxy
2	New England Revolution
3	Real Salt Lake
4	New York Red Bulls
