= 2017 New York Red Bulls season =

New York Red Bulls
2017 season
- Sporting director: Denis Hamlett
- Head coach: Jesse Marsch
- Major League Soccer: Conference: 6th Overall: 9th
- MLS Cup playoffs: Conference semi-finals
- U.S. Open Cup: Runners-up
- CONCACAF Champions League: Quarter-finals
- Top goalscorer: League: Bradley Wright-Phillips (17); All: Bradley Wright-Phillips (24)
- Highest home attendance: 25,219
- Lowest home attendance: 16,213
- Average home league attendance: 21,175
Home colors	Away colors

The 2017 New York Red Bulls season was the club's twenty-second season in Major League Soccer, the top division of soccer in the United States.

== Team information ==
=== Squad information ===
As of November 5, 2017

Appearances and goals are career totals from all-competitions.

Squad No.	Name	Nationality	Position(s)	Date of birth (age)	Signed from	Games played	Goals scored
Goalkeepers
18	Ryan Meara	(United States)	GK	November 15, 1990 (aged 26)	(United States) Fordham University	34	0
24	Evan Louro	(United States)	GK	January 19, 1996 (aged 21)	Academy	0	0
31	Luis Robles	(United States)	GK	May 11, 1984 (aged 32)	(Germany) Karlsruher SC	201	0
Defenders
3	Gideon Baah	(Ghana)	CB/LB	October 1, 1991 (aged 25)	(Finland) HJK Helsinki	10	2
5	Connor Lade	(United States)	RB/LB	November 16, 1989 (aged 27)	Academy	111	4
15	Sal Zizzo	(United States)	RB	April 3, 1987 (aged 29)	(United States) Sporting Kansas City	93	1
29	Fidel Escobar	(Panama)	RB	January 9, 1995 (aged 22)	(Panama) Sporting San Miguelito (on loan)	7	0
33	Aaron Long	(United States)	CB	October 12, 1992 (aged 24)	(United States) New York Red Bulls II	44	1
47	Hassan Ndam	(Cameroon)	CB	October 29, 1998 (aged 18)	(Cameroon) Rainbow F.C.	1	0
55	Damien Perrinelle	(France)	CB	September 12, 1983 (aged 33)	(France) FC Istres	82	2
62	Michael Amir Murillo	(Panama)	RB	February 11, 1996 (aged 21)	(Panama) San Francisco (on loan)	22	2
78	Aurélien Collin	(France)	CB	March 8, 1986 (aged 30)	(United States) Orlando City SC	44	0
92	Kemar Lawrence	(Jamaica)	LB	September 17, 1992 (aged 24)	(Jamaica) Harbour View	84	2
Midfielders
4	Tyler Adams	(United States)	CM	February 14, 1999 (aged 18)	Academy	36	2
6	Dan Metzger	(United States)	CM	August 6, 1993 (aged 23)	(United States) New York Red Bulls II	1	0
7	Derrick Etienne	(Haiti)	CM	November 25, 1996 (aged 20)	Academy	25	0
8	Felipe	(Brazil)	CM	September 30, 1990 (aged 26)	(Canada) Montreal Impact	124	10
13	Mike Grella	(United States)	LW	January 23, 1987 (aged 30)	(United States) Carolina RailHawks	89	18
16	Sacha Kljestan (captain)	(United States)	CM	September 9, 1985 (aged 31)	(Belgium) Anderlecht	121	22
17	Arun Basuljevic	(United States)	CM	December 17, 1995 (aged 21)	Academy	0	0
19	Alex Muyl	(United States)	RW/LW	September 30, 1995 (aged 21)	Academy	69	6
22	Dilly Duka	(United States)	CM	September 15, 1989 (aged 27)	(United States) Columbus Crew	3	0
27	Sean Davis	(United States)	CM	February 8, 1993 (aged 24)	Academy	80	5
77	Daniel Royer	(Austria)	RW/LW	May 22, 1990 (aged 26)	(Denmark) FC Midtjylland	41	16
88	Vincent Bezecourt	(France)	CM	June 10, 1993 (aged 23)	(United States) New York Red Bulls II	4	0
Forwards
10	Muhamed Keita	(Norway)	FW	September 2, 1990 (aged 26)	(Poland) Lech Poznań	7	0
30	Gonzalo Verón	(Argentina)	FW/RW	December 24, 1989 (aged 27)	(Argentina) San Lorenzo	82	12
99	Bradley Wright-Phillips	(England)	FW	March 12, 1985 (aged 31)	(England) Charlton Athletic	168	100

== Roster transactions ==
=== In ===
#	Pos.	Player	Signed from	Details	Date	Source
22	DF	(Canada) Karl Ouimette	(United States) Jacksonville Armada	Returned from Loan	November 4, 2016	
78	DF	(France) Aurélien Collin	Free Agent	Re-signed with club	January 4, 2017	
6	MF	(United States) Dan Metzger	(United States) New York Red Bulls II		January 23, 2017	
24	GK	(United States) Evan Louro	Academy	Homegrown player	January 23, 2017	
40	GK	(Dominican Republic) Rafael Díaz	(United States) New York Red Bulls II		January 24, 2017	
17	MF	(United States) Arun Basuljevic	Academy	Homegrown player	January 24, 2017	
55	DF	(France) Damien Perrinelle	Free Agent	Re-signed with club	January 25, 2017	
28	DF	(Cameroon) Hassan Ndam	(Cameroon) Rainbow F.C.	Undisclosed	January 31, 2017	
62	DF	(Panama) Michael Amir Murillo	(Panama) San Francisco	Season long loan	February 18, 2017	
33	DF	(United States) Aaron Long	(United States) New York Red Bulls II		February 22, 2017	
24	GK	(United States) Kyle Reynish	Free Agent	Re-signed with club	March 1, 2017	
9	FW	(Norway) Fredrik Gulbrandsen	(Austria) Red Bull Salzburg	Season long loan	March 10, 2017	
24	GK	(United States) Evan Louro	Academy	Homegrown player	April 29, 2017	
88	MF	(France) Vincent Bezecourt	(United States) New York Red Bulls II	Short Term Loan	July 13, 2017	
29	DF	(Panama) Fidel Escobar	(Panama) Sporting San Miguelito	18-month Loan	July 27, 2017	
10	FW	(Norway) Muhamed Keita	(Poland) Lech Poznań	Undisclosed	July 28, 2017	
22	MF	(United States) Dilly Duka	(United States) Columbus Crew		August 10, 2017	
88	MF	(France) Vincent Bezecourt	(United States) New York Red Bulls II	Signed permanently from loan	August 11, 2017	

=== Out ===
#	Pos.	Player	Signed by	Details	Date	Source
26	FW	(Israel) Omer Damari	(Germany) RB Leipzig	End of loan	November 10, 2016	
33	DF	(United States) Aaron Long	(United States) New York Red Bulls II	End of loan	November 21, 2016	
22	DF	(Canada) Karl Ouimette	(United States) San Francisco Deltas	Option Declined	November 28, 2016	
23	DF	(Guadeloupe) Ronald Zubar	(France) Red Star F.C.	Option Declined	November 28, 2016	
24	GK	(United States) Kyle Reynish	Free Agent (Note: Following Reynish's contract expiration he was re-signed on March 1, 2017)	Contract Expired	December 12, 2016	
55	DF	(France) Damien Perrinelle	Free Agent (Note: Following Perrinelle's contract expiration he was re-signed on January 25, 2017)	Contract Expired	December 12, 2016	
78	DF	(France) Aurélien Collin	Free Agent (Note: Following Collin's contract expiration he was re-signed on January 4, 2017)	Contract Expired	December 12, 2016	
98	MF	(England) Shaun Wright-Phillips	(United States) Phoenix Rising FC	Contract Expired	December 12, 2016	
25	DF	(United States) Chris Duvall	(United States) Minnesota United FC	Expansion Draft	December 13, 2016	
11	MF	(United States) Dax McCarty	(United States) Chicago Fire	$400,000 General Allocation Money	January 16, 2017	
24	GK	(United States) Kyle Reynish	(United States) Atlanta United FC	Fourth round draft pick	March 1, 2017	
24	GK	(United States) Evan Louro	(United States) New York Red Bulls II	Released	March 6, 2017	
40	GK	(Dominican Republic) Rafael Díaz	(United States) New York Red Bulls II	Released	March 6, 2017	
9	FW	(Cameroon) Anatole Abang	(Finland) SJK	Loan until July 2017	March 28, 2017	
9	FW	(Norway) Fredrik Gulbrandsen	(Austria) Red Bull Salzburg	Waived	June 6, 2017	
20	DF	(United States) Justin Bilyeu	(United States) RGV FC Toros	Waived	June 28, 2017	
21	FW	(United States) Brandon Allen	(United States) Minnesota United FC	Season long loan	July 15, 2017	
9	FW	(Cameroon) Anatole Abang	(Romania) FC Astra Giurgiu	Loan until July 2018	August 9, 2017	

=== Draft picks ===
Round	#	Position	Player	College/Club Team	Reference
1 (17)	-	MF	(Bermuda) Zeiko Lewis	Boston College	
2 (39)	-	MF	(United States) Ethan Kutler	Colgate University	
3 (61)	-	DF	(Jamaica) Jordan Scarlett	Iona College	

== Preseason and Friendlies ==
=== Friendlies ===
January 27	New York Red Bulls	2–0	Portland Timbers	Tucson, Arizona
8:30 p.m. EST	Clarke 3' (o.g.); Bezecourt 61' (pen.)	Report		Stadium: Kino Veterans Memorial Stadium
Note: Three 30-minute periods.

January 31	New York Red Bulls	0–1	Real Salt Lake	Tucson, Arizona
1:00 p.m. EST		Report	Allen 82'	Stadium: Kino Veterans Memorial Stadium

February 3	New York Red Bulls	0–2	New England Revolution	Tucson, Arizona
1:30 p.m. EST		Report	Kamara 25'; Wright 89'	Stadium: Kino Veterans Memorial Stadium

February 11	FC Tucson	1–3	New York Red Bulls	Tucson, Arizona
8:30 p.m. EST	Sanchez	Report	Zizzo; Verón; Allen	Stadium: Kino Veterans Memorial Stadium

February 15 Desert Diamond Cup	New York City FC	0–2	New York Red Bulls	Tucson, Arizona
4:00 p.m. EST		Report	Kljestan 23', 43'	Stadium: Kino Veterans Memorial Stadium

February 18 Desert Diamond Cup	New York Red Bulls	0–3	Sporting Kansas City	Tucson, Arizona
5:30 p.m. EST		Report	Dwyer 31' (pen.); Porter 82'; Sallói 87'	Stadium: Kino Veterans Memorial Stadium

February 22 Desert Diamond Cup	New York Red Bulls	2–2	Houston Dynamo	Tucson, Arizona
4:00 p.m. EST	Fernandez 65'; Terci 72'		Manotas 35'; Anibaba 41'	Stadium: Kino Veterans Memorial Stadium

February 25 Desert Diamond Cup	New York Red Bulls	0–2	New England Revolution	Tucson, Arizona
3:00 p.m. EST			Rowe 52'; Nguyen 90'	Stadium: Kino Veterans Memorial Stadium

=== Statistics ===
2 Goals

- (United States) Sacha Kljestan

1 Goal

- (United States) Brandon Allen
- (United States) Lucas Terci
- (France) Vincent Bezecourt
- (Argentina) Gonzalo Verón
- (United States) Omir Fernandez
- (United States) Sal Zizzo

== Major League Soccer season ==
=== Eastern Conference ===
Pos	Team	Pld	W	L	T	GF	GA	GD	Pts	Qualification
1	Toronto FC	34	20	5	9	74	37	+37	69	MLS Cup Conference Semifinals
2	New York City FC	34	16	9	9	56	43	+13	57	MLS Cup Conference Semifinals
3	Chicago Fire	34	16	11	7	62	48	+14	55	MLS Cup Knockout Round
4	Atlanta United FC	34	15	9	10	70	40	+30	55	MLS Cup Knockout Round
5	Columbus Crew	34	16	12	6	53	49	+4	54	MLS Cup Knockout Round
6	New York Red Bulls	34	14	12	8	53	47	+6	50	MLS Cup Knockout Round
7	New England Revolution	34	13	15	6	53	61	−8	45	
8	Philadelphia Union	34	11	14	9	50	47	+3	42	
9	Montreal Impact	34	11	17	6	52	58	−6	39	
10	Orlando City SC	34	10	15	9	39	58	−19	39	
11	D.C. United	34	9	20	5	31	60	−29	32	

Source: MLS

=== Overall ===
Pos	Team	Pld	W	L	T	GF	GA	GD	Pts	Qualification
7	Seattle Sounders FC	34	14	9	11	52	39	+13	53	
8	Vancouver Whitecaps FC	34	15	12	7	50	49	+1	52	
9	New York Red Bulls	34	14	12	8	53	47	+6	50	
10	Houston Dynamo	34	13	10	11	57	45	+12	50	
11	Sporting Kansas City	34	12	9	13	40	29	+11	49	CONCACAF Champions League

Source: MLS
Rules for classification: 1) points; 2) total wins; 3) total goal differential; 4) total goals scored; 5) disciplinary points; 6) away goals scored; 7) away goal differential; 8) coin toss or drawing of lots

=== Results summary ===
Overall								Home						Away					
Pld	W	D	L	GF	GA	GD	Pts	W	D	L	GF	GA	GD	W	D	L	GF	GA	GD
34	14	8	12	53	47	+6	50	9	6	2	30	14	+16	5	2	10	23	33	−10

Last updated: October 22, 2017.
Source: MLS

=== Matches ===
March 5 1	Atlanta United FC	1–2	New York Red Bulls	Atlanta
7:30 p.m. EST	Asad 25'; Carmona (red card) 88'	Report	Royer 76'; Walkes 82' (o.g.)	Stadium: Bobby Dodd Stadium; Attendance: 55,297; Referee: Mark Geiger

March 11 2	New York Red Bulls	1–0	Colorado Rapids	Harrison, New Jersey
4:00 p.m. EST	Miller 45' (o.g.)	Report		Stadium: Red Bull Arena; Attendance: 19,375; Referee: Robert Sibiga

March 19 3	Seattle Sounders FC	3–1	New York Red Bulls	Seattle, Washington
7:00 p.m. EST	Dempsey 25' (pen.); Morris 66'; Shipp 79'	Report	Wright-Phillips 57'	Stadium: Century Link Field; Attendance: 45,600; Referee: Baldomero Toledo

March 25 4	New York Red Bulls	0–0	Real Salt Lake	Harrison, New Jersey
4:00 p.m. EST		Report		Stadium: Red Bull Arena; Attendance: 16,213; Referee: Chris Penso

April 1 5	Houston Dynamo	4–1	New York Red Bulls	Houston, Texas
8:30 p.m. EST	Remick 14'; Torres 41' (pen.), 56', 90+1'	Report	Wright-Phillips 13'	Stadium: BBVA Compass Stadium; Attendance: 17,914; Referee: Fotis Bazakos

April 9 6	Orlando City SC	1–0	New York Red Bulls	Orlando, Florida
4:00 p.m. EST	Carrasco 34'	Report		Stadium: Orlando City Stadium; Attendance: 25,527; Referee: Ismail Elfath

April 15 7	New York Red Bulls	2–0	D.C. United	Harrison, New Jersey
7:30 p.m. EST	Muyl 46'; Wright-Phillips 62'	Report		Stadium: Red Bull Arena; Attendance: 20,104; Referee: Sorin Stoica

April 22 8	New York Red Bulls	2–0	Columbus Crew	Harrison, New Jersey
7:30 p.m. EST	Muyl 11'; Royer 38' (pen.)	Report		Stadium: Red Bull Arena; Attendance: 20,008; Referee: Jorge Gonzalez

April 29 9	New York Red Bulls	2–1	Chicago Fire	Harrison, New Jersey
7:30 p.m. EST	Wright-Phillips 37'; Lawrence 71'	Report	Nikolic 59'	Stadium: Red Bull Arena; Attendance: 22,814; Referee: Hilario Grajeda

May 3 10	Sporting Kansas City	2–0	New York Red Bulls	Kansas City, Kansas
8:30 p.m. EST	Dwyer 46', 68'	Report		Stadium: Children's Mercy Park; Attendance: 18,965; Referee: Allen Chapman

May 6 11	Philadelphia Union	3–0	New York Red Bulls	Chester, Pennsylvania
7:00 p.m. EST	Sapong 74', 81', 85' (pen.)	Report		Stadium: Talen Energy Stadium; Attendance: 16,297; Referee: Silviu Petrescu

May 14 12	New York Red Bulls	1–3	LA Galaxy	Harrison, New Jersey
6:00 p.m. EST	Royer 90+3'	Report	Alessandrini 8', 9' dos Santos 78' (pen.); Diallo (yellow card) 27' (yellow-red card) 90'	Stadium: Red Bull Arena; Attendance: 18,376; Referee: Jose Carlos Rivero

May 19 13	New York Red Bulls	1–1	Toronto FC	Harrison, New Jersey
7:30 p.m. EST	Wright-Phillips 38'	Report	Cheyrou 70'	Stadium: Red Bull Arena; Attendance: 21,025; Referee: Robert Sibiga

May 27 14	New York Red Bulls	2–1	New England Revolution	Harrison, New Jersey
7:30 p.m. EST	Wright-Phillips 47'; Royer 74'	Report	Nguyen 9' (pen.)	Stadium: Red Bull Arena; Attendance: 19,252; Referee: Ismail Elfath

June 3 15	Montreal Impact	1–0	New York Red Bulls	Montreal
TBD EST	Džemaili 67'	Report		Stadium: Saputo Stadium; Attendance: 19,032; Referee: Mark Geiger

June 18 16	Philadelphia Union	0–2	New York Red Bulls	Chester, Pennsylvania
5:00 p.m. EST	Jones (red card) 53'	Report	Wright-Phillips 87', 90+2'	Stadium: Talen Energy Stadium; Attendance: 17,720; Referee: Allen Chapman

June 24 17	New York Red Bulls	0–2	New York City FC	Harrison, New Jersey
1:30 p.m. EST		Report	Jack Harrison 33'; Sweat 65'	Stadium: Red Bull Arena; Attendance: 25,219; Referee: Alan Kelly

July 5 18	New England Revolution	2–3	New York Red Bulls	Foxborough, Massachusetts
7:30 p.m. EST	Bunbury 21'; Nguyen 26'	Report	Wright-Phillips 23'; Royer 55' (pen.); Verón 90'	Stadium: Gillette Stadium; Attendance: 13,924; Referee: Silviu Petrescu

July 19 19	New York Red Bulls	5–1	San Jose Earthquakes	Harrison, New Jersey
7:30 p.m. EST	Davis 38'; Kljestan 73'; Felipe 75'; Royer 90', 90+1'	Report	Qazaishvili 88'	Stadium: Red Bull Arena; Attendance: 17,392; Referee: Fotis Bazakos

July 22 20	Minnesota United FC	0–3	New York Red Bulls	Minneapolis, Minnesota
4:00 p.m. EST		Report	Royer 16'; Wright-Phillips 67'; Muyl 90'	Stadium: TCF Bank Stadium; Attendance: 20,022; Referee: Hilario Grajeda

July 29 21	New York Red Bulls	4–0	Montreal Impact	Harrison, New Jersey
TBD EST	Royer 23' (pen.), 89'; Murillo 58'; Wright-Phillips 85'	Report		Stadium: Red Bull Arena; Attendance: 22,251; Referee: Ricardo Salazar

August 6 22	New York City FC	3–2	New York Red Bulls	New York, New York
6:00 p.m. EST	Villa 28', 72', 75' (pen.)	Report	Wright-Phillips 41', 64'; Zizzo (red card) 90+4'	Stadium: Yankee Stadium; Attendance: 33,679; Referee: Baldomero Toledo

August 12 23	New York Red Bulls	3–1	Orlando City SC	Harrison, New Jersey
7:30 p.m. EST	Pereira 30' (o.g.); Wright-Phillips 60'; Davis 80'	Report	Rivas 18'; Kaka (red card) 90'	Stadium: Red Bull Arena; Attendance: 25,219; Referee: Jorge Gonzalez

August 18 24	Portland Timbers	2–0	New York Red Bulls	Portland, Oregon
10:00 p.m. EST	Valeri 65'; Mabiala (red card) 80'; Mattocks 90+6'	Report		Stadium: Providence Park; Attendance: 21,144; Referee: Allen Chapman

August 25 25	New York Red Bulls	1–1	New York City FC	Harrison, New Jersey
7:00 p.m. EST	Verón 70' (pen.)	Report	Moralez 56'	Stadium: Red Bull Arena; Attendance: 25,219; Referee: Jair Marrufo

September 2 26	FC Dallas	2–2	New York Red Bulls	Frisco, Texas
9:00 p.m. EST	Hayes (red card) 37'; Grana 54'; Díaz 75' (pen.)	Report	Kljestan 43'; Long 57'	Stadium: Toyota Stadium; Attendance: 16,035; Referee: Kevin Stott

September 9 27	Chicago Fire	1–1	New York Red Bulls	Bridgeview, Illinois
4:00 p.m. EST	Nikolic 66'	Report	Wright-Phillips 8'	Stadium: Toyota Park; Attendance: 17,808; Referee: Alan Kelly

September 17 28	New York Red Bulls	0–0	Philadelphia Union	Harrison, New Jersey
1:00 p.m. EST		Report		Stadium: Red Bull Arena; Attendance: 20,534; Referee: Jose Carlos Rivero

September 23 29	Columbus Crew	3–2	New York Red Bulls	Columbus, Ohio
7:30 p.m. EST	Mensah 6'; Meram 54'; Williams 66'	Report	Wright-Phillips 14'; Verón 72' (pen.)	Stadium: Mapfre Stadium; Attendance: 20,008; Referee: Fotis Bazakos

September 27 30	New York Red Bulls	3–3	D.C. United	Harrison, New Jersey
7:30 p.m. EST	Adams 19', 74'; Verón 78' (pen.)	Report	Stieber 45+1'; Mullins 70'; Escobar 90+1' (o.g.)	Stadium: Red Bull Arena; Attendance: 16,538; Referee: Chris Penso

September 30 31	Toronto FC	4–2	New York Red Bulls	Toronto
7:00 p.m. EST	Morrow 32', 37', 90+1'; Vázquez 80' (pen.)	Report	Verón 39'; Royer 77' (pen.)	Stadium: BMO Field; Attendance: 28,979

October 27 32	New York Red Bulls	3–0	Vancouver Whitecaps FC	Harrison, New Jersey
5:00 p.m. EST	Royer 33'; Wright-Phillips 58'; Felipe 72'	Report		Stadium: Red Bull Arena; Attendance: 25,219; Referee: Jorge Gonzalez

October 15 33	New York Red Bulls	0–0	Atlanta United FC	Harrison, New Jersey
3:00 p.m. EST		Report		Stadium: Red Bull Arena; Attendance: 25,219; Referee: Alan Kelly

October 22 34	D.C. United	1–2	New York Red Bulls	Washington, D.C.
4:00 p.m. EST	Arriola 44'; Acosta (red card) 70'	Report	Murillo 68'; Verón 75'	Stadium: RFK Stadium; Attendance: 41,418; Referee: David Gantar

== MLS Cup Playoffs ==
=== Knockout round ===
October 25 Knockout Round	Chicago Fire	0–4	New York Red Bulls	Bridgeview, Illinois
8:30 p.m. EST		Report	Wright-Phillips 7'; Kljestan 11'; Royer 70'; Verón 87'	Stadium: Toyota Park; Attendance: 11,647; Referee: Ismail Elfath

=== Eastern Conference Semifinals ===
October 30 Leg 1	New York Red Bulls	1–2	Toronto FC	Harrison, New Jersey
7:00 p.m. EST	Royer 45+3' (pen.)	Report	Vázquez 8'; Giovinco 72'	Stadium: Red Bull Arena; Attendance: 18,107; Referee: Drew Fischer

November 5 Leg 2	Toronto FC	0–1 (2–2 agg.)	New York Red Bulls	Toronto
3:00 p.m. EST	Altidore (red card) 45+2'	Report	Kljestan (red card) 45+2'; Wright-Phillips 53'	Stadium: BMO Field; Attendance: 29,974; Referee: Chris Penso
Note: Toronto advances on away goals.

== CONCACAF Champions League ==
=== 2016–17 ===
==== Group stage ====
Group stage matches were played during the 2016 New York Red Bulls season.

Pos	Team	Pld	W	D	L	GF	GA	GD	Pts	Qualification	NYR	ALI	ANT
1	(United States) New York Red Bulls	4	2	2	0	5	1	+4	8	Quarter-finals	—	1–0	3–0
2	(El Salvador) Alianza	4	1	2	1	5	4	+1	5		1–1	—	1–1
3	(Guatemala) Antigua	4	0	2	2	2	7	−5	2		0–0	1–3	—

Source: CONCACAF

==== Quarterfinals ====
February 22 First leg	New York Red Bulls (United States)	1–1	(Canada) Vancouver Whitecaps FC	Harrison
8:00 p.m. EST	Wright-Phillips 62'	Report	Manneh 39'; Techera (red card) 70'	Stadium: Red Bull Arena; Attendance: 3,231; Referee: César Arturo Ramos (Mexico)

March 2 Second leg	Vancouver Whitecaps FC (Canada)	2–0 (3–1 agg.)	(United States) New York Red Bulls	Vancouver, Canada
10:00 p.m. EST	Davies 5'; Montero 76'	Report		Stadium: BC Place; Referee: Valdin Legister (Jamaica)

=== 2017–18 ===
New York will enter the competition during Phase Two in 2018.

== U.S. Open Cup ==
New York entered the 2017 U.S. Open Cup with the rest of Major League Soccer in the fourth round.

June 14 4th Round	New York Red Bulls	1–0	New York City FC	Harrison, New Jersey
8:00 p.m. EST	Royer 67'	Report		Stadium: Red Bull Arena; Attendance: 11,311; Referee: Jose Carlos Rivero

June 28 Round of 16	New York Red Bulls	1–1 (a.e.t.) (5–3 p)	Philadelphia Union	Harrison, New Jersey
8:00 p.m. EST	Kljestan 42'	Report	Alberg 86'	Stadium: Red Bull Arena; Attendance: 9,136; Referee: Alex Chilowicz
	Penalties
	Zizzo (penalty scored); Verón (penalty scored); Royer (penalty scored); Kljestan (penalty scored); Felipe (penalty scored)		(penalty scored) Alberg; (penalty scored) Pontius; (penalty missed) Picault; (penalty scored) Epps

July 13 Quarterfinals	New England Revolution	0–1	New York Red Bulls	Boston, Massachusetts
7:30 PM EST	Angoua (red card) 75'	Report	Wright-Phillips 87'	Stadium: Jordan Field; Attendance: 2,331; Referee: Jorge González

August 15 Semifinals	FC Cincinnati	2–3 (a.e.t.)	New York Red Bulls	Cincinnati
8:00 p.m. EST	Bone 31'; Berry 62'	Report	Verón 75'; Wright-Phillips 78', 101'	Stadium: Nippert Stadium; Attendance: 33,250; Referee: Sorin Stoica

September 20 Final	Sporting Kansas City	2–1	New York Red Bulls	Kansas City, Kansas
8:00 p.m. EST	Blessing 25'; Sallói 66'	Report	Wright-Phillips 90+1'	Stadium: Children's Mercy Park; Attendance: 21,523; Referee: Hilario Grajeda

== Player statistics ==
As of November 5, 2017.

No.	Pos	Nat	Player	Total		MLS		MLS Cup		U.S. Open Cup		Champions League	
No.	Pos	Nat	Player	Apps	Goals	Apps	Goals	Apps	Goals	Apps	Goals	Apps	Goals
Goalkeepers
18	GK	(United States) USA	Ryan Meara	5	-5	0	0	0	0	5	-5	0	0
24	GK	(United States) USA	Evan Louro	0	0	0	0	0	0	0	0	0	0
31	GK	(United States) USA	Luis Robles	39	-52	34	-47	3	-2	0	0	2	-3
Defenders
3	DF	(Ghana) GHA	Gideon Baah	0	0	0	0	0	0	0	0	0	0
5	DF	(United States) USA	Connor Lade	24	0	16+5	0	0+1	0	1+1	0	0	0
15	DF	(United States) USA	Sal Zizzo	30	0	18+5	0	0	0	3+2	0	2	0
29	DF	(Panama) PAN	Fidel Escobar	7	0	5+1	0	0	0	1	0	0	0
33	DF	(United States) USA	Aaron Long	41	1	30+1	1	3	0	5	0	2	0
47	DF	(Cameroon) CMR	Hassan Ndam	1	0	0+1	0	0	0	0	0	0	0
55	DF	(France) FRA	Damien Perrinelle	31	0	22+3	0	3	0	3	0	0	0
62	DF	(Panama) PAN	Michael Amir Murillo	22	2	15+2	2	3	0	2	0	0	0
78	DF	(France) FRA	Aurélien Collin	13	0	7+2	0	0	0	2	0	2	0
92	DF	(Jamaica) JAM	Kemar Lawrence	31	1	23+1	1	3	0	3	0	1	0
Midfielders
4	MF	(United States) USA	Tyler Adams	32	2	23+1	2	3	0	5	0	0	0
6	MF	(United States) USA	Dan Metzger	1	0	0+1	0	0	0	0	0	0	0
7	MF	(Haiti) HAI	Derrick Etienne	22	0	8+10	0	0+1	0	0+1	0	0+2	0
8	MF	(Brazil) BRA	Felipe	43	2	33	2	3	0	5	0	2	0
13	MF	(United States) USA	Mike Grella	11	0	3+5	0	0	0	1	0	0+2	0
16	MF	(United States) USA	Sacha Kljestan	42	4	28+4	2	3	1	5	1	2	0
17	MF	(United States) USA	Arun Basuljevic	0	0	0	0	0	0	0	0	0	0
19	MF	(United States) USA	Alex Muyl	36	3	21+9	3	0+1	0	4	0	0+1	0
22	MF	(United States) USA	Dilly Duka	3	0	2+1	0	0	0	0	0	0	0
27	MF	(United States) USA	Sean Davis	37	2	21+6	2	2+1	0	4+1	0	2	0
77	MF	(Austria) AUT	Daniel Royer	34	15	23+3	12	3	2	2+1	1	2	0
88	MF	(France) FRA	Vincent Bezecourt	4	0	2+1	0	0+1	0	0	0	0	0
Forwards
10	FW	(Norway) NOR	Muhamed Keita	7	0	2+4	0	0	0	0+1	0	0	0
30	FW	(Argentina) ARG	Gonzalo Verón	34	8	5+19	6	1+2	1	0+5	1	2	0
99	FW	(England) ENG	Bradley Wright-Phillips	42	24	29+3	17	3	2	5	4	2	1
Left Club During Season
9	FW	(Norway) NOR	Fredrik Gulbrandsen	12	0	4+8	0	0	0	0	0	0	0
20	DF	(United States) USA	Justin Bilyeu	2	0	1	0	0	0	0	0	1	0
21	FW	(United States) USA	Brandon Allen	0	0	0	0	0	0	0	0	0	0

=== Top scorers ===
Place	Position	Name	MLS	MLS Cup	U.S. Open Cup	Champions League	Total
1	FW	(England) Bradley Wright-Phillips	17	2	4	1	24
2	MF	(Austria) Daniel Royer	12	2	1	0	15
3	FW	(Argentina) Gonzalo Verón	6	1	1	0	8
4	MF	(United States) Sacha Kljestan	2	1	1	0	4
5	MF	(United States) Alex Muyl	3	0	0	0	3
6	MF	(United States) Tyler Adams	2	0	0	0	2
6	MF	(Brazil) Felipe	2	0	0	0	2
6	MF	(United States) Sean Davis	2	0	0	0	2
6	DF	(Panama) Michael Amir Murillo	2	0	0	0	2
7	DF	(United States) Aaron Long	1	0	0	0	1
7	DF	(Jamaica) Kemar Lawrence	1	0	0	0	1
Own goals			3	0	0	0	3
Total			53	6	7	1	67

As of November 5, 2017.

=== Assist Leaders ===
Place	Position	Name	MLS	MLS Cup	U.S. Open Cup	Champions League	Total
1	MF	(United States) Sacha Kljestan	9	1	0	0	10
2	MF	(United States) Tyler Adams	3	1	1	0	5
2	DF	(Jamaica) Kemar Lawrence	5	0	0	0	5
3	MF	(Brazil) Felipe	3	0	1	0	4
4	DF	(United States) Sal Zizzo	2	0	1	0	3
4	MF	(United States) Alex Muyl	3	0	0	0	3
4	MF	(Austria) Daniel Royer	2	1	0	0	3
5	MF	(Haiti) Derrick Etienne	2	0	0	0	2
5	MF	(United States) Sean Davis	1	1	0	0	2
5	FW	(Argentina) Gonzalo Verón	1	0	0	1	2
5	FW	(England) Bradley Wright-Phillips	1	0	1	0	2
6	DF	(United States) Connor Lade	1	0	0	0	1
6	FW	(Norway) Fredrik Gulbrandsen	1	0	0	0	1
6	FW	(Norway) Muhamed Keita	1	0	0	0	1
6	DF	(France) Damien Perrinelle	0	1	0	0	1
Total			35	5	4	1	45

As of November 5, 2017.
This table does not include secondary assists.

=== Shutouts ===
Place	Position	Name	MLS	MLS Cup	U.S. Open Cup	Champions League	Total
1	GK	(United States) Luis Robles	10	2	0	0	12
2	GK	(United States) Ryan Meara	0	0	2	0	2
Total			10	2	2	0	14

As of November 5, 2017.
