= 2021 Visit Tucson Sun Cup =

Tournament details
- Host country: United States
- Dates: April 3–10
- Teams: 5

Final positions
- Champions: Real Salt Lake
- Runners-up: LA Galaxy
- Third place: Colorado Rapids
- Fourth place: Sporting Kansas City

Tournament statistics
- Matches played: 6
- Goals scored: 11 (1.83 per match)
- Top scorer(s): Michael Barrios; Damir Kreilach (2 goals)
- Best player(s): Damir Kreilach (RSL)

The 2021 Visit Tucson Sun Cup was the eleventh edition of the preseason exhibition soccer tournament among Major League Soccer (MLS) and United Soccer League (USL) teams. It was held between April 3 to April 10 in Tucson.

== Teams ==
The following clubs entered the tournament:

Major League Soccer

- Colorado Rapids (sixth appearance)
- LA Galaxy (second appearance)
- Real Salt Lake (eighth appearance)
- Sporting Kansas City (eighth appearance)

USL Championship

- Phoenix Rising FC (fifth appearance)

== Matches ==
All times are Mountain Standard Time (UTC-07:00)
Schedule is subject to change.

April 3	Sporting Kansas City	1–0	LA Galaxy	Tucson, Arizona
12:00pm	Busio 33'	SKC Report; LAG Report		Stadium: Kino North Stadium

April 3	Real Salt Lake	3–0	Colorado Rapids	Tucson, Arizona
6:00pm	Julio 12'; Kreilach 44', 77'	COL Report		Stadium: Kino North Stadium

April 7	Colorado Rapids	2–2	LA Galaxy	Tucson, Arizona
3:00pm	Barrios 17'; Bassett 63'		Lletget 25'; Harvey 54'	Stadium: Kino North Stadium

April 7	Real Salt Lake	1–0	Phoenix Rising FC	Tucson, Arizona
6:00pm	Rusnák 26'			Stadium: Kino North Stadium

April 10	LA Galaxy	1–0	Real Salt Lake	Tucson, Arizona
5:00pm	Vazquez 42'	LAG Report; RSL Report		Stadium: Kino North Stadium

April 10	Colorado Rapids	1–0	Phoenix Rising FC	Tucson, Arizona
7:30pm	Barrios 20'	COL Report; PHX Report		Stadium: Kino North Stadium

== Table standings ==
Pos	Club	GP	W	L	T	GF	GA	GD	Pts
1	Real Salt Lake (C)	3	2	1	0	4	1	+3	6
2	LA Galaxy	3	1	1	1	3	3	0	4
3	Colorado Rapids	3	1	1	1	3	5	-2	4
4	Sporting Kansas City	1	1	0	0	1	0	+1	3
5	Phoenix Rising FC	2	0	2	0	0	2	-2	0

(C) - Cup Winner

== Top scorers ==
Rank	Player	Nation	Club	Goals
1	Damir Kreilach	CRO	Real Salt Lake	2
1	Michael Barrios	COL	Colorado Rapids	2
3	Cole Bassett	USA	Colorado Rapids	1
3	Gianluca Busio	USA	Sporting Kansas City	1
3	Carlos Harvey	PAN	LA Galaxy	1
3	Anderson Julio	ECU	Real Salt Lake	1
3	Sebastian Lletget	USA	LA Galaxy	1
3	Albert Rusnák	SLO	Real Salt Lake	1
3	Víctor Vázquez	ESP	LA Galaxy	1
