= 2020 Visit Tucson Sun Cup =

Tournament details
- Host country: United States
- Dates: February 15–22
- Teams: 6
- Venues: 2 (in 2 host cities)

Final positions
- Champions: Columbus Crew SC
- Runners-up: Phoenix Rising FC
- Third place: New York Red Bulls
- Fourth place: Houston Dynamo

Tournament statistics
- Matches played: 9
- Goals scored: 25 (2.78 per match)
- Top scorer: Gyasi Zardes (3 goals)
- Best player: Gyasi Zardes (CLB)

The 2020 Visit Tucson Sun Cup was the tenth edition of the preseason exhibition soccer tournament among Major League Soccer (MLS) and United Soccer League (USL) teams. It was held from February 15 to February 22 in Tucson and Phoenix, Arizona.

== Teams ==
The following clubs entered the tournament:

Major League Soccer

- Columbus Crew SC (second appearance)
- Houston Dynamo (fifth appearance)
- New York Red Bulls (seventh appearance)
- Real Salt Lake (seventh appearance)
- Sporting Kansas City (seventh appearance)

USL Championship

- Phoenix Rising FC (fourth appearance)

== Matches ==
All times are Mountain Standard Time (UTC-07:00)

February 15	Real Salt Lake	0–0	Sporting Kansas City	Tucson, Arizona
4:00pm		RSL Report; SKC Report		Stadium: Kino North Stadium

February 15	New York Red Bulls	1–1	Houston Dynamo	Tucson, Arizona
6:30pm	Kaku 12'	NYRB Report; HOU Report	Rodríguez 58'	Stadium: Kino North Stadium

February 15	Phoenix Rising FC	0–1	Columbus Crew SC	Scottsdale, Arizona
7:00pm		CLB Report; PHX Report	Zardes 73'	Stadium: Casino Arizona Field

February 19	Houston Dynamo	4–0	Real Salt Lake	Tucson, Arizona
4:00pm	Manotas 53'; McNamara 60'; Hansen 68'; Ramirez 81'	HOU Report; RSL Report		Stadium: Kino North Stadium

February 19	New York Red Bulls	1–1	Columbus Crew SC	Tucson, Arizona
6:30pm	White 68'	NYRB Report; CLB Report	Etienne 1'	Stadium: Kino North Stadium

February 19	Phoenix Rising FC	2–1	Sporting Kansas City	Scottsdale, Arizona
7:00pm	Moar 66'; Calistri 78'	PHX Report; SKC Report	Russell 56'	Stadium: Casino Arizona Field

February 22	New York Red Bulls	2–1	Sporting Kansas City	Tucson, Arizona
2:00pm	Valot 59'; Cásseres 86' (pen.)	NYRB Report; SKC Report	Kinda 61'	Stadium: Kino North Stadium

February 22	Columbus Crew SC	4–1	Houston Dynamo	Tucson, Arizona
5:00pm	Zardes 1', 23'; Mensah 4'; Zelarayán 15'	CLB Report; HOU Report	McNamara 52'	Stadium: Kino North Stadium

February 22	Phoenix Rising FC	3–2	Real Salt Lake	Scottsdale, Arizona
7:00pm	Farrell 19'; Asante 39'; Bakero 57'	PHX Report; RSL Report	Kreilach 11'; Meram 89'	Stadium: Casino Arizona Field

== Table standings ==
Pos	Club	GP	W	L	T	GF	GA	GD	Pts
1	Columbus Crew SC (C)	3	2	0	1	6	2	+4	7
2	Phoenix Rising FC	3	2	1	0	5	4	+1	6
3	New York Red Bulls	3	1	0	2	4	3	+1	5
4	Houston Dynamo	3	1	1	1	6	5	+1	4
5	Sporting Kansas City	3	0	2	1	2	4	-2	1
6	Real Salt Lake	3	0	2	1	2	7	-5	1

(C) - Cup Winner

== Top scorers ==
Rank	Player	Nation	Club	Goals
1	Gyasi Zardes	USA	Columbus Crew SC	3
2	Tommy McNamara	USA	Houston Dynamo	2
3	Solomon Asante	GHA	Phoenix Rising FC	1
3	Jon Bakero	ESP	Phoenix Rising FC	1
3	Joey Calistri	USA	Phoenix Rising FC	1
3	Cristian Cásseres	VEN	New York Red Bulls	1
3	Derrick Etienne	HAI	Columbus Crew SC	1
3	Joe Farrell	USA	Phoenix Rising FC	1
3	Niko Hansen	DEN	Houston Dynamo	1
3	Kaka	PAR	New York Red Bulls	1
3	Gadi Kinda	ISR	Sporting Kansas City	1
3	Damir Kreilach	CRO	Real Salt Lake	1
3	Mauro Manotas	COL	Houston Dynamo	1
3	Jonathan Mensah	GHA	Columbus Crew SC	1
3	Justin Meram	IRQ	Real Salt Lake	1
3	Santi Moar	ESP	Phoenix Rising FC	1
3	Christian Ramirez	USA	Houston Dynamo	1
3	Johnny Russell	SCO	Sporting Kansas City	1
3	Memo Rodríguez	USA	Houston Dynamo	1
3	Florian Valot	FRA	New York Red Bulls	1
3	Brian White	USA	New York Red Bulls	1
3	Lucas Zelarayán	ARG	Columbus Crew SC	1
