= 2014 Desert Diamond Cup =

Tournament details
- Host country: United States
- Dates: February 19 − March 1
- Teams: 6
- Venue(s): 1 (in 1 host city)

Tournament statistics
- Matches played: 12
- Goals scored: 26 (2.17 per match)

The 2014 Desert Diamond Cup was a soccer exhibition featuring five soccer teams from Major League Soccer and one from USL Premier Development League, held between February 19 – March 1, 2014. The preseason tournament was played at the Kino Sports Complex 11,000 seat main stadium in Tucson, Arizona. This was the 4th annual Desert Diamond Cup.

== Teams ==
The following six clubs participated in the 2014 tournament:

- Chicago Fire (first appearance)
- Chivas USA (first appearance)
- Colorado Rapids (first appearance)
- FC Tucson (second appearance)
- New England Revolution (third appearance)
- Real Salt Lake (third appearance)

Chivas Rayadas de Guadalajara was also announced to play in the final match in place of FC Tucson.

== Standings ==
Pos	Team	Pld	W	D	L	GF	GA	GD	Pts
1	Chicago Fire	4	3	0	1	6	2	+4	9
2	Chivas USA	4	1	3	0	5	4	+1	6
3	Real Salt Lake	4	1	2	1	4	3	+1	5
4	New England Revolution	4	1	2	1	5	5	0	5
5	Colorado Rapids	4	1	2	1	4	4	0	5
6	FC Tucson	3	0	1	2	2	6	−4	1 (Note: Chivas Rayadas de Guadalajara took the place of FC Tucson in the final match v. Chicago Fire.)

Updated to match(es) played on unknown. Source:

== Matches ==
The tournament featured a round-robin group stage followed by third-place and championship matches.

=== Tournament ===
February 19 Game 1	Chivas USA	1–1	FC Tucson	Tucson, Arizona
13:00 PST	Alvarez 59'; Jean-Baptiste (yellow card) 90'	Report	Rapella 54'	Stadium: Kino Veterans Memorial Stadium

February 19 Game 2	Colorado Rapids	1–2	Chicago Fire	Tucson, Arizona
15:30 PST	Serna 68'; José Mari (yellow card) 75'	Report	Ward 37'; Amarikwa 40'	Stadium: Kino Veterans Memorial Stadium

February 19 Game 3	Real Salt Lake	0–0	New England Revolution	Tucson, Arizona
18:00 PST		Report		Stadium: Kino Veterans Memorial Stadium; Referee: Baldomero Toledo

February 22 Game 4	FC Tucson	0–2	Chicago Fire	Tucson, Arizona
13:00 PST		Report	Alex 19'; Soumaré 43'	Stadium: Kino Veterans Memorial Stadium

February 22 Game 5	Colorado Rapids	1–0	Real Salt Lake	Tucson, Arizona
15:30 PST	Brown 69'	Report	Wingert (yellow card) 30'	Stadium: Kino Veterans Memorial Stadium; Referee: Kevin Stott

February 22 Game 6	New England Revolution	2–3	Chivas USA	Tucson, Arizona
18:00 PST	Nguyen 11'; Bunbury 20'; Gonçalves (yellow card) 42'	Report	Torres 25'; Alvarez 54'; Rosales 74'; Burling (yellow card) 92+'	Stadium: Kino Veterans Memorial Stadium; Referee: Jair Marrufo

February 26 Game 7	Chivas USA	0–0	Colorado Rapids	Tucson, Arizona
13:00 PST	Borja (yellow card) 58'	Report	Sánchez (yellow card) 32'; Watts (yellow card) 45'	Stadium: Kino Veterans Memorial Stadium

February 26 Game 8	New England Revolution	1–0	Chicago Fire	Tucson, Arizona
15:30 PST	Rowe 90+1'	Report	Hurtado (yellow card) 34'	Stadium: Kino Veterans Memorial Stadium

February 26 Game 9	Real Salt Lake	3–1	FC Tucson	Tucson, Arizona
18:00 PST	Saborío 24', 45'; Maund 44'	Report	Acosta (yellow card) 44'; Antoniuk 59'	Stadium: Kino Veterans Memorial Stadium; Referee: Ricardo Salazar

=== Finals ===
March 1 Game 10	Real Salt Lake	1–1	Chivas USA	Tucson, Arizona
13:00 MST	Saborío 70'	Report	Torres 10'; Minda (yellow card) 14'; Bautista (yellow card) 81'	Stadium: Kino Veterans Memorial Stadium; Attendance: 1,604; Referee: Ismail Elfath

March 1 Game 11	New England Revolution	2–2	Colorado Rapids	Tucson, Arizona
15:30 MST	Bunbury 5'; Rowe (yellow card) 37'; Mullins 57'; Imbongo (red card) 85'	Report	Buddle 25'; LaBrocca (yellow card) 35'; José Mari (yellow card) 55'; Sánchez 82'; Chávez (red card) 85'	Stadium: Kino Veterans Memorial Stadium; Attendance: 1,604; Referee: Jair Marrufo

March 1 Game 12	Chicago Fire	2–0	Chivas Rayadas de Guadalajara	Tucson, Arizona
18:00 MST	Anangonó 15'; Larentowicz (yellow card) 80'; Magee (yellow card) 88'; Amarikwa 90'	Report	Flores (yellow card) 18'	Stadium: Kino Veterans Memorial Stadium; Attendance: 1,604
