= Pablo Aránguiz =

Chilean footballer (born 1997)

Personal information
- Full name: Pablo Mauricio Aránguiz Salazar
- Date of birth: March 17, 1997 (age 29)
- Place of birth: Independencia, Santiago, Chile
- Height: 1.72 m (5 ft 8 in)
- Position: Midfielder

Team information
- Current team: Unión Española
- Number: 10

Youth career
- Unión Española

Senior career*
Years	Team	Apps	(Gls)
2015–2018	Unión Española	51	(11)
2018–2020	FC Dallas	20	(0)
2019	→ Unión Española (loan)	7	(0)
2020	→ Universidad de Chile (loan)	10	(4)
2020–2022	Universidad de Chile	17	(1)
2023	Ñublense	16	(1)
2024–	Unión Española	54	(17)

International career^{‡}
2019–2020	Chile U23	8	(0)
2021–	Chile	1	(0)
- * Club domestic league appearances and goals as of 10 March 2026 ‡ National team caps and goals as of 01:15, 22 June 2021 (UTC)

Pablo Mauricio Aránguiz Salazar (born March 17, 1997) is a Chilean footballer who plays as a midfielder for Unión Española.

== Club career ==
Aránguiz was born in Independencia, Santiago. He and his younger brother lived with their grandparents in Recoleta after their parents separated. Aránguiz began his football career with Independencia-based club Unión Española. He made his first-team debut on 2 August 2015, as a late substitute in a Copa Chile match against Unión San Felipe, and made his first appearance in the Primera División on 15 October in a 4–0 win at home to Unión La Calera. Under the management of Martín Palermo, Aránguiz became a regular in the match day squad in the 2016–17 Clausura, and a regular in the starting eleven in the 2017 Torneo de Transición, to the extent that he was named under-20 Player of the Season at the ANFP awards ceremony.

On 24 July 2018, Aránguiz signed with Major League Soccer side FC Dallas.

On 30 December 2019, Aránguiz was put on loan from FC Dallas to Universidad de Chile for one year with an option to buy. Universidad made the transfer permanent on 25 November 2020.

In 2023, he played for Ñublense in the Chilean top division. The next season, he returned Unión Española after four years.

== International career ==
Aránguiz represented Chile U23 at the 2019 Toulon Tournament and at the 2020 Pre-Olympic Tournament, making four appearances in both tournaments.

At senior level, he received his first call-up for the 2021 Copa América, making his international debut in the second match against Bolivia at the minute 84.

== Career statistics ==
=== International ===
As of match played 22 June 2021

Appearances and goals by national team and year
National team	Year	Apps	Goals
Chile	2021	1	0
Total		1	0

== Honours ==
Unión Española

- Chilean Primera División runner-up: 2017 Torneo de Transición

FC Dallas

- Mobile Mini Sun Cup (1): 2019

Individual

- ANFP Revelación Sub 20: 2017
