= Youness Mokhtar =

Moroccan-Dutch footballer (born 1991)

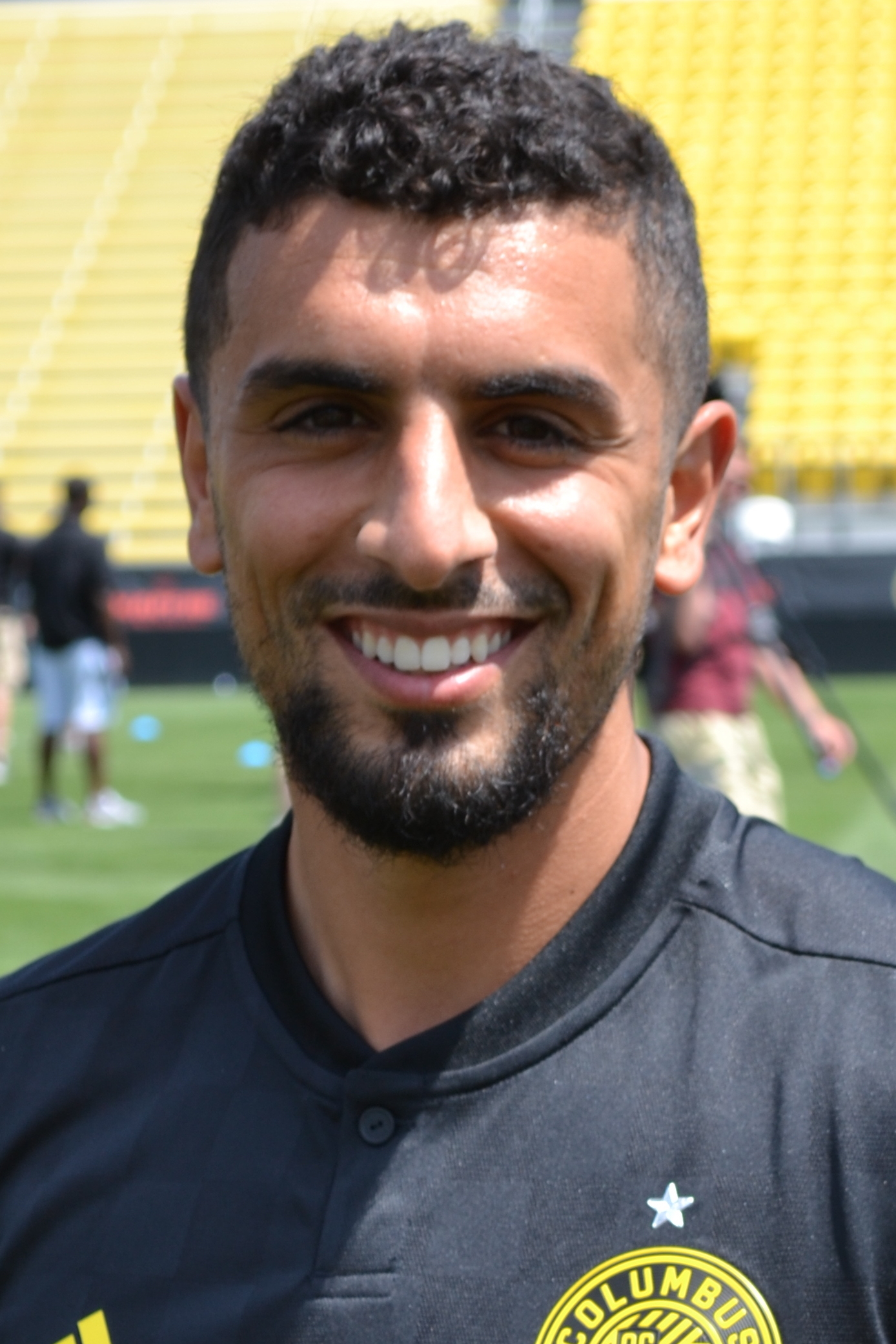
- Mokhtar with Columbus Crew in 2019

Personal information
- Date of birth: 29 August 1991 (age 35)
- Place of birth: Utrecht, Netherlands
- Height: 1.78 m (5 ft 10 in)
- Position: Winger

Team information
- Current team: DVS '33

Youth career
- –1997: UCS EDO
- 1997–2000: Elinkwijk
- 2000–2010: PSV

Senior career*
Years	Team	Apps	(Gls)
2010–2012	PSV	0	(0)
2011–2012	→ Eindhoven (loan)	25	(8)
2012–2013	PEC Zwolle	36	(7)
2013–2015	Twente	57	(8)
2013	Jong Twente	1	(1)
2015	Al-Nassr	7	(0)
2016–2018	PEC Zwolle	56	(12)
2018–2019	Ankaragücü	12	(1)
2019	Stabæk	2	(0)
2019–2020	Columbus Crew	27	(4)
2021	ADO Den Haag	10	(0)
2022	Raja Club Athletic	0	(0)
2022	Bhayangkara	10	(0)
2023	Eindhoven	7	(0)
2024–	DVS '33	3	(1)

International career
2007–2008	Netherlands U17	11	(1)
2009	Netherlands U19	2	(1)
2011–2012	Morocco U20	4	(0)
2011	Morocco U23	7	(3)
- * Club domestic league appearances and goals as of 23 March 2024

Youness Mokhtar (Arabic: يونس مختار; born 29 August 1991) is a professional footballer who plays as a winger for Derde Divisie club DVS '33. Born in the Netherlands, Mokhtar has represented both his native country and Morocco internationally at youth level.

== Club career ==
=== Early career ===
Mokhtar formerly played for Eindhoven, Twente, Al-Nassr and PEC Zwolle.

In April 2019, he signed a contract with Stabæk. The club announced on 3 June 2019 that Mokhtar had left the club by mutual agreement.

=== Columbus Crew SC ===
On 19 July 2019, Mokhtar signed with Columbus Crew of Major League Soccer as a free transfer. He made his debut on 10 August 2019 in a 2–2 draw against FC Cincinnati in the first Hell Is Real Derby in MLS, coming on as a substitute for Luis Díaz. He scored his first goal for the team about a month and a half later on 29 September 2019 in a 2–0 win over the Philadelphia Union. Mokhtar would make eight total appearances in the 2019 season.

Mokhtar remained with the team for the 2020 season. He scored important goals during the MLS is Back Tournament, scoring in the 4–0 win over FC Cincinnati and scoring the lone goal in a 1–0 win over Atlanta United, helping the team win their group. He was frequently used as both a starter and a substitute during the season, scoring three goals in 19 appearances, ten of which were starts. Columbus declined their contract option on Mokhtar following their 2020 season.

=== Later career ===
On 25 January 2021, Mokhtar joined Dutch Eredivisie side ADO Den Haag for the remainder of their season.

In March 2023, Mokhtar returned to the Netherlands to join Eindhoven on a deal until the end of the season.

== International career ==
Mokhtar was born in the Netherlands to parents of Moroccan descent. He was first called up to the Netherlands U17 squad, followed by a couple appearances with the Netherlands U19. Mokhtar then switched federations and joined the Morocco U20 team. Mokhtar was last called up by the Morocco U23s.

== Honours ==
Columbus Crew

- MLS Cup: 2020
