= 2017 Desert Diamond Cup =

Tournament details
- Host country: United States
- Dates: February 17–27
- Teams: 6
- Venue: 1 (in 1 host city)

Final positions
- Champions: Houston Dynamo (1st title)
- Runners-up: Colorado Rapids
- Third place: New England Revolution
- Fourth place: Sporting Kansas City

The 2017 Desert Diamond Cup was the seventh edition of the preseason exhibition tournament. The competition featured six soccer teams from Major League Soccer, held from February 15 to February 25, 2017. The defending champion was the New England Revolution.

== Teams ==
The following six clubs participated in the tournament:

- New England Revolution (sixth appearance)
- Sporting Kansas City (fourth appearance)
- New York Red Bulls (fourth appearance)
- Houston Dynamo (second appearance)
- New York City FC
- Colorado Rapids (fourth appearance)

== Table standings ==
Pos	Team	Pld	W	D	L	GF	GA	GD	Pts
1	Houston Dynamo	4	3	1	0	9	3	+6	10
2	Colorado Rapids	4	2	1	1	5	4	+1	7
3	New England Revolution	4	2	0	2	9	7	+2	6
4	Sporting Kansas City	4	1	1	2	5	8	−3	4
5	New York Red Bulls	4	1	1	2	4	7	−3	4
6	New York City	4	1	0	3	2	5	−3	3

=== Tournament ===
February 15 Game 1	Colorado Rapids	1–1	Sporting Kansas City	Tucson, Arizona
				Stadium: Kino North Stadium

February 15 Game 2	New York City FC	0–2	New York Red Bulls	Tucson, Arizona
				Stadium: Kino North Stadium

February 15 Game 3	Houston Dynamo	2–0	New England Revolution	Tucson, Arizona
				Stadium: Kino North Stadium

February 18 Game 4	New England Revolution	1–3	Colorado Rapids	Tucson, Arizona
				Stadium: Kino North Stadium

February 18 Game 5	New York Red Bulls	0–3	Sporting Kansas City	Tucson, Arizona
				Stadium: Kino North Stadium

February 18 Game 6	New York City FC	1–3	Houston Dynamo	Tucson, Arizona
				Stadium: Kino North Stadium

February 22 Game 7	New England Revolution	6–2	Sporting Kansas City	Tucson, Arizona
				Stadium: Kino North Stadium

February 22 Game 8	New York Red Bulls	2–2	Houston Dynamo	Tucson, Arizona
				Stadium: Kino North Stadium

February 22 Game 9	Colorado Rapids	1–0	New York City FC	Tucson, Arizona
				Stadium: Kino North Stadium

=== Finals ===
February 25 Consolation	New England Revolution	2–0	New York Red Bulls	Tucson, Arizona
13:00 MST				Stadium: Kino North Stadium

February 25 Consolation	New York City FC	1–0	Sporting Kansas City	Tucson, Arizona
15:30 MST	David Villa 51'			Stadium: Kino North Stadium

February 25 Championship Game	Colorado Rapids	0–2	Houston Dynamo	Tucson, Arizona
18:00 MST	Sjöberg (yellow card) 44'; Burch (yellow card) 84'	Report	Quioto 43' 67'; Alberth Elis (yellow card) 61'	Stadium: Kino North Stadium; Referee: Baldomero Toledo
