= Visit Tucson Sun Cup =

Desert Showcase
- Founded: 2011
- Teams: Varies
- Current champions: Real Salt Lake (2nd title)
- Most championships: New England Revolution; Real Salt Lake (2 titles)
- 2022 Desert Showcase

The Desert Showcase (formerly the Desert Cup, the Desert Diamond Cup, the Mobile Mini Sun Cup, and the Visit Tucson Sun Cup), is a preseason soccer tournament hosted by Phoenix Rising FC of the USL Championship and FC Tucson of USL League Two. The tournament is sponsored by the Tucson Convention and Visitors Bureau, known as Visit Tucson.

Beginning in 2011, the inaugural Desert Cup featured two Major League Soccer (MLS) clubs, Sporting Kansas City and New York Red Bulls. In the years since, the number of participating MLS clubs has continued to grow, with the 2018 Mobile Mini Sun Cup featuring eleven MLS clubs ‒ nearly half of the league's total membership.

== History ==
The first edition of the tournament, held at Hi Corbett Field, a former baseball spring training stadium saw sellout crowds with international stars such as Thierry Henry, Rafael Márquez, and Omar Bravo playing.

The second edition was held from February 22 through March 3, paralleling several other preseason tournaments ahead of the 2012 American outdoor domestic league seasons. Three new clubs competed in the 2012 edition of the tournament: defending MLS Cup champions LA Galaxy, Real Salt Lake, and the New England Revolution joined the New York Red Bulls, who returned for their second Desert Cup appearance. The 2012 Desert Diamond Cup moved to Kino Veterans Memorial Stadium and saw clubs play a total of four matches each.

Phoenix Rising FC purchased FC Tucson on October 11, 2017. On December 5, Phoenix Rising FC and FC Tucson announced that they would co-host the tournament and that it would be renamed the Mobile Mini Sun Cup, with Mobile Mini as sponsor. Games will be played at North Stadium at the Kino Sports Complex as well as Phoenix Rising Soccer Complex. A record 11 teams will participate in the 2018 tournament.

In 2020, the tournament will be renamed the Visit Tucson Sun Cup and will host Sporting Kansas City, Real Salt Lake, New York Red Bulls, Houston Dynamo and Columbus Crew SC along with Phoenix Rising FC.

=== Sponsors ===
- Desert Diamond Casinos & Entertainment (2012–2017)
- Mobile Mini Storage Solutions (2018–2019)
- Visit Tucson (2020–present)

== Results ==
Year	1st place	2nd place	3rd place	4th place
2011	Sporting Kansas City	New York Red Bulls	FC Tucson	Arizona Sahuaros
2012	LA Galaxy	New England Revolution	Real Salt Lake	New York Red Bulls
2013	Seattle Sounders FC	Real Salt Lake	New England Revolution	New York Red Bulls
2014	Chicago Fire	Chivas USA	Real Salt Lake	New England Revolution
2015	Real Salt Lake	Colorado Rapids	Sporting Kansas City	Seattle Sounders FC
2016	New England Revolution	Columbus Crew SC	Sporting Kansas City; Houston Dynamo (tied)	
2017	Houston Dynamo	Colorado Rapids	New England Revolution	Sporting Kansas City
2018	New England Revolution	Houston Dynamo	Portland Timbers	Sporting Kansas City
2019	FC Dallas	Portland Timbers	New York Red Bulls	Real Salt Lake
2020	Columbus Crew SC	Phoenix Rising FC	New York Red Bulls	Houston Dynamo
2021	Real Salt Lake	LA Galaxy	Colorado Rapids	Sporting Kansas City

Team	Wins	Runners-up	Years won	Years runner-up
Real Salt Lake	2	1	2015, 2021	2013
New England Revolution	2	1	2016, 2018	2012
Houston Dynamo	1	1	2017	2018
LA Galaxy	1	1	2012	2021
Columbus Crew SC	1	1	2020	2016
FC Dallas	1	0	2019	
Chicago Fire	1	0	2014	
Seattle Sounders FC	1	0	2013	
Sporting Kansas City	1	0	2011	
Colorado Rapids	0	2		2015, 2017
Phoenix Rising FC	0	1		2020
Portland Timbers	0	1		2019
Chivas USA	0	1		2014
New York Red Bulls	0	1		2011

== See also ==
- Carolina Challenge Cup – A preseason soccer tournament held in Charleston, South Carolina hosted by USL Pro side, Charleston Battery.
- Walt Disney World Pro Soccer Classic – Held at the ESPN Wide World of Sports Complex at the Walt Disney World Resort near Orlando, Florida. The tournament is hosted also by MLS side, Orlando City.
- Hawaiian Islands Invitational – 2012 event, also a property of ESPN and featuring teams from Australia, Japan, and South Korea
