= 2011 Desert Diamond Cup =

Tournament details
- Host country: United States
- Dates: March 4 – 5
- Teams: 4
- Venue(s): 1 (in 1 host city)

Final positions
- Champions: Sporting Kansas City (1st title)
- Runners-up: New York Red Bulls
- Third place: FC Tucson

Tournament statistics
- Matches played: 4
- Goals scored: 21 (5.25 per match)
- Top scorer(s): Pat Perkins

The 2011 Desert Diamond Cup (formerly known as the Desert Cup and also known as the FC Tucson Desert Diamond Cup) was a preseason soccer tournament held at Hi Corbett Field in Tucson, Arizona. The tournament, the first edition of the Desert Cup, was held from March 4–5, 2011 and featured two Major League Soccer clubs along two US Club Soccer clubs.

The tournament was won by Sporting Kansas City, who edged the New York Red Bulls on goal differential.

== Teams ==
The following four clubs competed in the tournament:

- FC Tucson from US Club Soccer, hosts (1st appearance)
- Sporting Kansas City from Major League Soccer (1st appearance)
- New York Red Bulls from Major League Soccer (1st appearance)
- Arizona Sahuaros from the US Club Soccer (1st appearance)

== Matches ==
March 4
18:00 PST

Arizona Sahuaros	1 – 6	Sporting Kansas City
Baker 86'	Report	Jones 35'; Mravec 53'; Sapong 56'; Myers 77'; Zusi 83'; Ubiparipovic 90'

Hi Corbett Field, Tucson, Arizona
Attendance: 2,560
March 4
20:00 PST

New York Red Bulls	3 – 1	FC Tucson
Hertzog 19' 53' (pen.) da Luz 68'	Report	Gauna 62'

Hi Corbett Field, Tucson, Arizona
Attendance: 2,560

March 5
18:00 PST

Arizona Sahuaros	3 – 3	FC Tucson
Perkins 11' 14' 26'	Report	Diouf 4'; Gauna 69'; Goodfellow 74'

Hi Corbett Field, Tucson, Arizona
Attendance: 10,097
March 5
20:00 PST

New York Red Bulls	2 – 2	Sporting Kansas City
Henry 22'; Richards 76'	Report	Arnaud 20'; Kamara 61' (pen.)

Hi Corbett Field, Tucson, Arizona
Attendance: 10,097

== Final standings ==
Club	Pts	Pld	W	L	T	GF	GA	GD
Sporting Kansas City	4	2	1	0	1	8	3	+5
New York Red Bulls	4	2	1	0	1	5	3	+2
FC Tucson	1	2	0	1	1	4	6	-2
Arizona Sahuaros	1	2	0	1	1	4	9	-5
