= Casino Arizona Field =

Former soccer stadium in Arizona, US

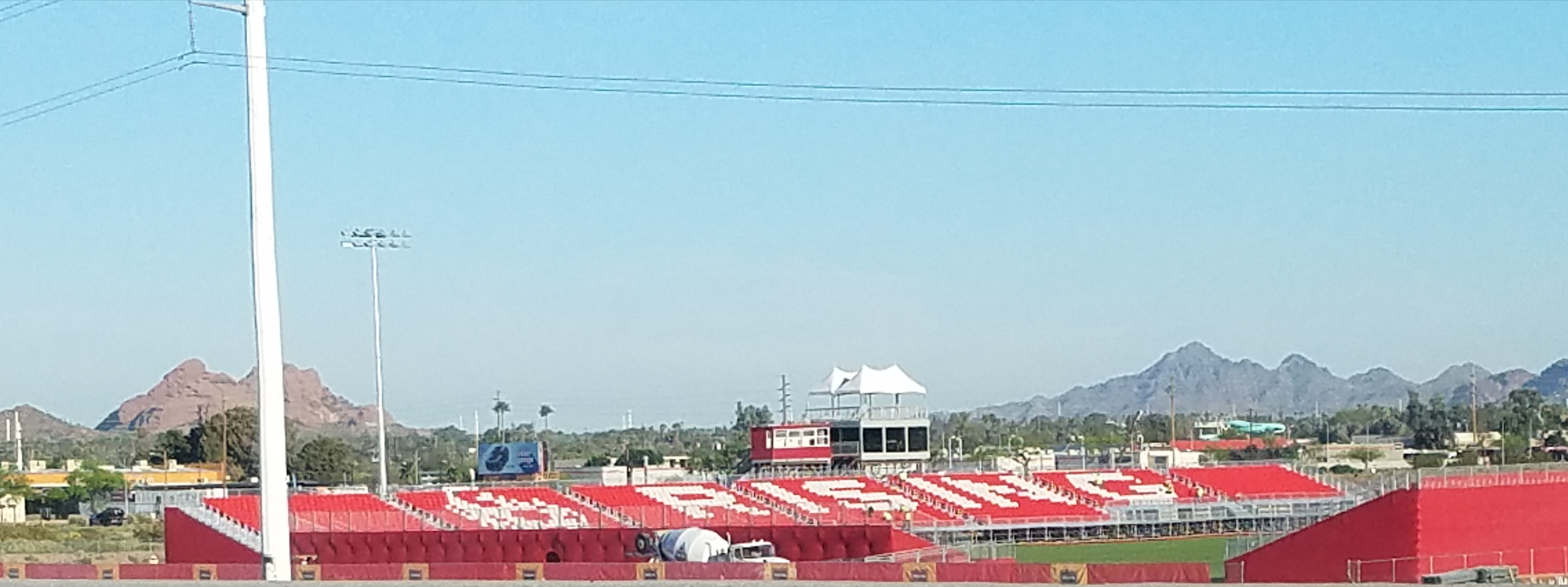
- A nearly complete stadium
- Interactive map of Casino Arizona Field
- Former names: Phoenix Rising Soccer Complex (2017–2018)
- Address: 751 North McClintock Drive; Tempe, AZ 85281
- Coordinates: 33°26′15″N 111°54′20″W
- Owner: Phoenix Rising FC
- Capacity: 6,200
- Executive suites: 15
- Surface: Grass
- Record attendance: 7,707 (October 26, 2018 vs. Swope Park Rangers)
- Field size: 116 yd × 74 yd (106 m × 68 m)
- Acreage: 15.8

Construction
- Groundbreaking: February 1, 2017
- Opened: March 25, 2017
- Architect: DLR Group
- General contractor: Rummel Construction

Tenant
- Phoenix Rising FC (USLC) (2017–2020)

Casino Arizona Field, formerly known as Phoenix Rising Soccer Complex, was a 15.8-acre soccer-specific training and stadium facility located in the Salt River Pima–Maricopa Indian Community near Tempe, Arizona. It was the home of Phoenix Rising FC of the USL Championship from 2017 to 2020. The complex had a 6,200-seat modular stadium with luxury suites, separate training field, and parking area and was privately funded.

== History ==
The first game at the complex was held on March 25, 2017, when Rising FC hosted Toronto FC II in front of a crowd of 6,890 fans. They won their first game at the stadium on April 8 by defeating LA Galaxy II 2–1. Luke Rooney scored both goals, the first one on a penalty kick. They were the first goals scored by the team in their new stadium.

On March 15, 2019, Casino Arizona signed a multi-year sponsorship deal with Rising FC, including naming rights to the stadium, now called Casino Arizona Field.

On December 10, 2020, Phoenix Rising FC announced that a new, expanded stadium would be built in the Gila River Indian Community near Chandler, Arizona. The luxury boxes and some of the stands were moved to the new site. The main and practice pitches were left intact and will be utilized by the Phoenix Rising Youth Academy.

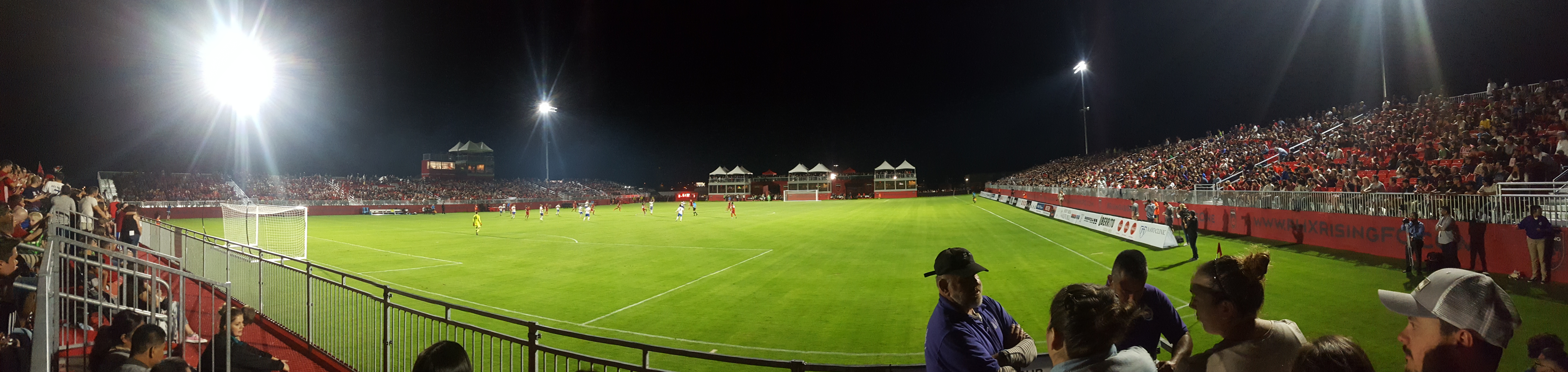
The inaugural match for the Phoenix Rising Soccer Complex on March 25, 2017, Toronto FC II vs. Phoenix Rising FC
