= Kino Sports Complex =

Sports venue in Tucson, Arizona

- Kino Veterans Memorial Stadium (baseball); North Stadium (soccer)
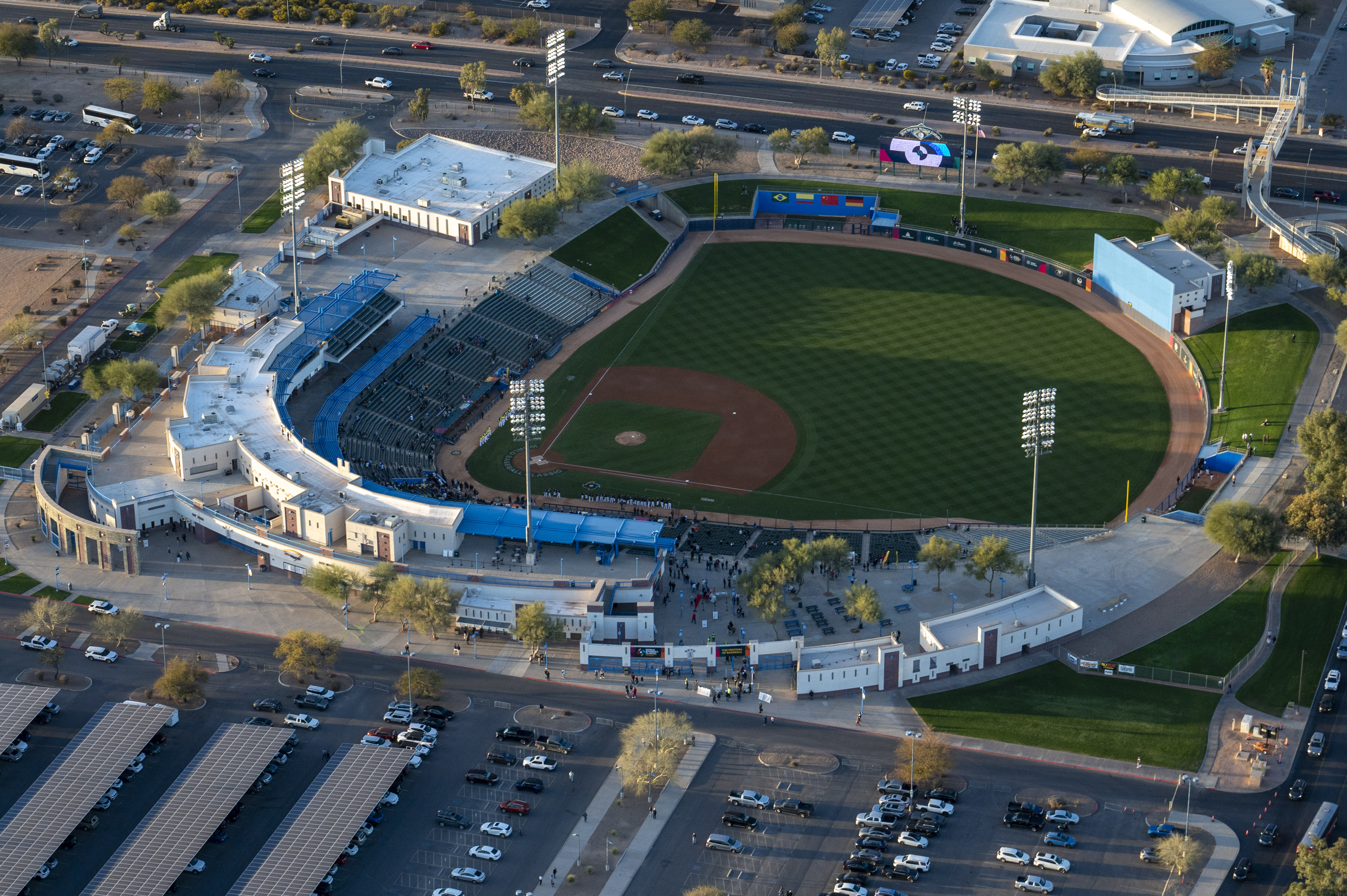
- Kino Veterans Memorial Stadium during 2026 World Baseball Classic qualification
- Interactive map of Kino Sports Complex
- Former names: Tucson Electric Park (1998–2010)
- Coordinates: 32°10′36″N 110°56′0″W
- Owner: Pima County
- Operator: Pima County Stadium District
- Capacity: Kino Veterans Memorial Stadium; 11,500; North Stadium; 3,200
- Surface: Grass
- Field size: Foul lines – 340 ft (103.6 m); Center field – 405 ft (123.4 m)

Construction
- Groundbreaking: February 14, 1997
- Opened: February 27, 1998
- Cost: $38 million ($75.1 million in 2025 dollars)
- Architect: Populous
- Structural engineer: HMW Consulting Structural Engineers Inc.
- Services engineers: M-E Engineers, Inc.
- General contractor: Conelly Swinerton

Tenants
- Memorial Stadium; Arizona Diamondbacks (MLB)* (1998–2010); Chicago White Sox (MLB)* (1998–2008); Tucson Sidewinders (PCL) (1998–2008); Tucson Padres (PCL) (2011–2013); Tucson Saguaros (PL) (2016–2017, 2022–present); North Stadium; FC Tucson (USL2) (2012–present); Pima CC Aztecs football (2014–2018)

Website
- www.kinosportscomplex.com

Kino Sports Complex is a multiple-use sports complex in Tucson, Arizona. The Arizona Diamondbacks and Chicago White Sox formerly utilized the complex's main ballpark, Kino Veterans Memorial Stadium, for Cactus League games each March and had their minor league complexes on-site. The ballpark was also home to the Tucson Sidewinders of the Pacific Coast League for the team's last decade in Tucson, running from the stadium's 1998 opening season to the 2008 season. The ballpark was a temporary home (2011–2013) to the Tucson Padres (formerly the Portland Beavers) of the Pacific Coast League during the team's relocation to El Paso, Texas. It is also the regular season home of the Pecos League's Tucson Saguaros baseball team since 2016. It seats 11,500 fans, and hosts concerts in addition to its primary function as a baseball park.

Kino Sports Complex also hosts soccer matches. FC Tucson of USL League Two plays its home matches at the complex's North Stadium, its primary soccer stadium. The complex serves as the preseason home of Major League Soccer's New York Red Bulls and host of the Desert Diamond Cup preseason soccer tournament.

== History ==
=== Spring training and AAA venue ===
Tucson Electric Park opened in 1998. Larger and more modern than central Tucson's Hi Corbett Field, it is situated 4 miles south of Hi Corbett, at the intersection of several major thoroughfares including I-10 and SR-86. TEP opened the same year that the Arizona Diamondbacks began operations in Phoenix, and the Tucson Toros moved from Hi Corbett to TEP, renamed themselves the Tucson Sidewinders, and became the Diamondbacks' AAA affiliate. Furthermore, the Diamondbacks themselves became a tenant of TEP for spring training, sharing the facility with the Chicago White Sox (who moved from their previous spring training facility in Sarasota, Florida). Across town, the Colorado Rockies continued to hold their spring training at Hi Corbett Field.

=== Mexican Rookie team ===
The unaffiliated Tucson Mexican All-Stars of the Arizona Rookie League played at the spring training complex across from the stadium from 1998 to 2000.

=== Departure of MLB spring training ===
The Chicago White Sox had an agreement to move to Glendale in a stadium that was completed in the 2009 season. However, the Sox' lease on TEP was to last through 2012. In order to leave TEP early, the Sox proposed a youth baseball academy backed by Major League Baseball surrounding TEP. On November 18, 2008, the Pima County Board of Supervisors agreed to the White Sox's revised offer of $5 million, thus allowing the team to move to Glendale in time for the 2009 season. Colorado Rockies, spring training occupant of Tucson's Hi Corbett Field, and the Arizona Diamondbacks, who were tenants at TEP and the Kino Sports Complex, indicated that they would both need Tucson to have three teams in order to continue playing there. Tucson was therefore abandoned as a spring training venue, and all Cactus League games now take place in the Phoenix metropolitan area. The Diamondbacks and Rockies share the new Salt River Fields at Talking Stick, which opened in 2011 near Scottsdale.

=== Departure of the Sidewinders ===
The Tucson Sidewinders also played their last season at TEP in 2008. The team moved to Reno, Nevada, renaming itself the Reno Aces and remaining the AAA affiliate of the Diamondbacks.

At the same time, the Reno Silver Sox of the independent Golden Baseball League, displaced by the arrival of the Aces, relocated to Tucson. Instead of using TEP, however, the new team located itself at the more historic Hi Corbett Field and retook the historic name of the Tucson Toros.

TEP was thus, for a time, without any Major League or minor league baseball tenant.

=== Name change ===
In 2010, after the end of the naming agreement with the local electric utility, Tucson Electric Power, the stadium was renamed after Eusebio Kino, the Jesuit missionary who first explored southern Arizona in the late 17th and early 18th centuries. The Pima County Board of Supervisors approved the name change (Kino Veterans Memorial Stadium) on January 18, 2011.

=== Tucson Padres ===
In 2011, the San Diego Padres Triple-A affiliate relocated from Portland, Oregon to Kino Veterans Memorial Stadium and renamed itself the Tucson Padres. They were formerly known as the Portland Beavers. Originally the San Diego Padres organization wanted to arrange for a stadium to be approved and constructed in Escondido, California, however that stadium plan later fell through when California eliminated their redevelopment agencies. The team departed Tucson for El Paso, Texas prior to the beginning of the 2014 season and assumed the name "El Paso Chihuahuas."

=== FC Tucson ===
Since 2012, FC Tucson has played its games at Kino Sports Complex's North Stadium. The club began its existence in the Premier Development League (now USL League Two), and in 2019 began play in the higher-level USL League One. In 2023, the team went back to USL League Two.

=== Pima Community College ===
The Pima Community College Aztecs football played its home games at Kino Veterans Memorial Stadium for several seasons. The team moved to the Kino Sports Complex North Stadium for the 2014 season until the school ended its football program completely in 2018.

=== World Baseball Classic ===
The qualifiers for the 2023 World Baseball Classic were held at Kino Veterans Memorial Stadium in September 2022, which was also done for 2026.

| Preceded by Hi Corbett Field | Home of the Tucson Sidewinders; 1998–2008 | Succeeded by Aces Ballpark |
| Preceded by first ballpark | Home of the Arizona Diamondbacks Spring Training; 1998–2010 | Succeeded by Salt River Fields at Talking Stick |
| Preceded by Ed Smith Stadium | Home of the Chicago White Sox Spring Training; 1998–2008 | Succeeded by Camelback Ranch |
| Preceded by PGE Park | Home of the Tucson Padres; 2011–2013 | Succeeded by Southwest University Park |
| Preceded by first ballpark | Home of the Tucson Saguaros; 2016–2017, 2022-present | Succeeded by Current |
