= List of Major League Soccer transfers 2012 =

The following is a list of transfers for the 2012 Major League Soccer season. The Montreal Impact made their first moves by signing Nelson Rivas, Hassoun Camara, Evan Bush, and Siniša Ubiparipović. On November 23, 2011, the Impact selected 10 unprotected players in the 2011 MLS Expansion Draft. The rest of the moves were made from the 2011–2012 off-season all the way through the 2012 season.

== Transfers ==
Date	Name	Moving from	Moving to	Mode of Transfer
October 3, 2011	(Colombia) Nelson Rivas	Unattached	Montreal Impact	Free
October 11, 2011	(France) Hassoun Camara	Unattached	Montreal Impact	Free
October 21, 2011	(United States) Evan Bush	Unattached	Montreal Impact	Free
November 1, 2011	(Bosnia and Herzegovina) Siniša Ubiparipović	Unattached	Montreal Impact	Free
November 21, 2011	(England) Ryan Smith	Sporting Kansas City	Chivas USA	Trade
November 23, 2011	(United States) Justin Braun	Chivas USA	Montreal Impact	Trade
November 23, 2011	(United States) Jeb Brovsky	Vancouver Whitecaps FC	Montreal Impact	Expansion Draft
November 23, 2011	(United States) Bobby Burling	San Jose Earthquakes	Montreal Impact	Expansion Draft
November 23, 2011	(United States) Brian Ching	Houston Dynamo	Montreal Impact	Expansion Draft
November 23, 2011	(United States) Josh Gardner	Columbus Crew	Montreal Impact	Expansion Draft
November 23, 2011	(Tanzania) Nizar Khalfan	Vancouver Whitecaps FC	Philadelphia Union	Waiver Draft
November 23, 2011	(United States) Justin Mapp	Philadelphia Union	Montreal Impact	Expansion Draft
November 23, 2011	(El Salvador) Gerson Mayen	Chivas USA	Montreal Impact	Trade
November 23, 2011	(The Gambia) Sanna Nyassi	Colorado Rapids	Montreal Impact	Expansion Draft
November 23, 2011	(United States) James Riley	Seattle Sounders FC	Montreal Impact	Expansion Draft
November 23, 2011	(United States) James Riley	Montreal Impact	Chivas USA	Trade
November 23, 2011	(United States) Seth Sinovic	Sporting Kansas City	Montreal Impact	Expansion Draft
November 23, 2011	(United States) Zarek Valentin	Chivas USA	Montreal Impact	Expansion Draft
November 23, 2011	(United States) Tyson Wahl	Seattle Sounders FC	Montreal Impact	Trade
November 23, 2011	(United States) Collen Warner	Real Salt Lake	Montreal Impact	Expansion Draft
November 25, 2011	(United States) Bryan Arguez	Unattached	Montreal Impact	Free
November 28, 2011	(United States) Davy Arnaud	Sporting Kansas City	Montreal Impact	Trade
November 28, 2011	(Jamaica) Donovan Ricketts	Los Angeles Galaxy	Montreal Impact	Trade
November 28, 2011	(United States) Seth Sinovic	Montreal Impact	Sporting Kansas City	Trade
November 29, 2011	(United States) Jeremy Hall	FC Dallas	Toronto FC	Trade
November 29, 2011	(Brazil) Paulo Nagamura	Chivas USA	Sporting Kansas City	Trade
November 29, 2011	(United States) Robbie Russell	Real Salt Lake	D.C. United	Trade
November 30, 2011	(United States) Shea Salinas	Vancouver Whitecaps FC	San Jose Earthquakes	Trade
December 1, 2011	(Haiti) Jean Alexandre	Real Salt Lake	San Jose Earthquakes	Trade
December 2, 2011	(Israel) Orr Barouch	(Mexico) Tigres	Chicago Fire	Undisclosed
December 2, 2011	(United States) Bobby Convey	San Jose Earthquakes	Sporting Kansas City	Trade
December 5, 2011	(El Salvador) Arturo Alvarez	Real Salt Lake	Chivas USA	Re-Entry Draft
December 5, 2011	(South Africa) Danleigh Borman	Toronto FC	New England Revolution	Re-Entry Draft
December 5, 2011	(United States) Matt Luzunaris	San Jose Earthquakes	(United States) Orlando City	Free
December 5, 2011	(United States) Carlos Mendes	New York Red Bulls	Columbus Crew	Re-Entry Draft
December 5, 2011	(United States) Jay Nolly	Vancouver Whitecaps FC	Chicago Fire	Trade
December 5, 2011	(England) Ian Westlake	Unattached	Montreal Impact	Free
December 6, 2011	(Brazil) Luiz Camargo	(Brazil) Paraná	Houston Dynamo	Undisclosed
December 6, 2011	(South Korea) Lee Young-Pyo	Unattached	Vancouver Whitecaps FC	Free
December 7, 2011	(Austria) Michael Gspurning	(Greece) Skoda Xanthi	Seattle Sounders FC	Free
December 7, 2011	(Bermuda) Reggie Lambe	Unattached	Toronto FC	Free
December 7, 2011	(Costa Rica) Josué Martínez	(Costa Rica) Saprissa	Philadelphia Union	Undisclosed
December 7, 2011	(Colombia) Miguel Montaño	Unattached	Montreal Impact	Free
December 9, 2011	(Canada) Greg Sutton	Unattached	Montreal Impact	Free
December 12, 2011	(New Zealand) Andrew Boyens	Chivas USA	Los Angeles Galaxy	Re-Entry Draft
December 12, 2011	(Mexico) Omar Bravo	Sporting Kansas City	(Mexico) Cruz Azul	Free
December 12, 2011	(United States) Marc Burch	D.C. United	Seattle Sounders FC	Re-Entry Draft
December 12, 2011	(United States) Jon Conway	Chicago Fire	Los Angeles Galaxy	Re-Entry Draft
December 12, 2011	(Zimbabwe) Kheli Dube	New England Revolution	Chicago Fire	Re-Entry Draft
December 12, 2011	(United States) Hunter Freeman	Houston Dynamo	Colorado Rapids	Re-Entry Draft
December 12, 2011	(Sweden) Erik Friberg	Seattle Sounders FC	(Sweden) Malmö FF	Undisclosed
December 12, 2011	(Bosnia and Herzegovina) Baggio Husidić	Chicago Fire	Colorado Rapids	Re-Entry Draft
December 12, 2011	(United States) Nate Jaqua	Seattle Sounders FC	New England Revolution	Re-Entry Draft
December 12, 2011	(United States) Chris Leitch	San Jose Earthquakes	Los Angeles Galaxy	Re-Entry Draft
December 12, 2011	(United States) Pat Noonan	Seattle Sounders FC	Los Angeles Galaxy	Re-Entry Draft
December 12, 2011	(Brazil) Marcelo Sarvas	(Costa Rica) Alajuelense	Los Angeles Galaxy	Undisclosed
December 12, 2011	(United States) Clyde Simms	D.C. United	New England Revolution	Re-Entry Draft
December 15, 2011	(United States) Landon Donovan	Los Angeles Galaxy	(England) Everton	Loan
December 15, 2011	(United States) Lee Nguyen	Unattached	Vancouver Whitecaps FC	Lottery
December 15, 2011	(Colombia) José Adolfo Valencia	(Colombia) Santa Fe	Portland Timbers	Undisclosed
December 16, 2011	(Honduras) Marvin Chávez	FC Dallas	San Jose Earthquakes	Trade
December 16, 2011	(England) Matt Watson	(United States) Carolina RailHawks	Vancouver Whitecaps FC	Undisclosed
December 19, 2011	(Canada) Patrice Bernier	(Denmark) Lyngby BK	Montreal Impact	Free
December 21, 2011	(Panama) Gabriel Gómez	(Mexico) Indios	Philadelphia Union	Undisclosed
December 21, 2011	(Brazil) Felipe Martins	(Switzerland) Lugano	Montreal Impact	Undisclosed
December 21, 2011	(Ecuador) Oswaldo Minda	(Ecuador) Deportivo Quito	Chivas USA	Undisclosed
December 22, 2011	(Costa Rica) Porfirio López	(China) Dalian Shide	Philadelphia Union	Undisclosed
December 23, 2011	(Bosnia and Herzegovina) Baggio Husidić	Colorado Rapids	(Sweden) Hammarby	Undisclosed
December 23, 2011	(United States) Nick Noble	(Sweden) Ljungskile SK	Los Angeles Galaxy	Undisclosed
December 28, 2011	(Honduras) Víctor Bernárdez	(Belgium) Anderlecht	San Jose Earthquakes	Undisclosed
December 28, 2011	(United States) Nathan Sturgis	Toronto FC	Houston Dynamo	Trade
December 29, 2011	(Sweden) Adam Johansson	(Sweden) IFK Göteborg	Seattle Sounders FC	Free
January 3, 2012	(Panama) Blas Pérez	(Mexico) Tigres	FC Dallas	Free
January 3, 2012	(Colombia) Hernán Pertúz	(Colombia) Independiente Medellín	FC Dallas	Free
January 4, 2012	(Chile) Milovan Mirošević	(Chile) Universidad Católica	Columbus Crew	Undisclosed
January 5, 2012	(United States) Jonathan Borrajo	(Norway) Hamarkameratene	New York Red Bulls	Free
January 5, 2012	(United States) Omar Gonzalez	Los Angeles Galaxy	(Germany) 1. FC Nürnberg	Loan
January 6, 2012	(Argentina) Martín Bonjour	(Uruguay) Rampla Juniors	Vancouver Whitecaps FC	Undisclosed
January 6, 2012	(France) Thierry Henry	New York Red Bulls	(England) Arsenal	Loan
January 6, 2012	(Costa Rica) Olman Vargas	(Costa Rica) Herediano	Columbus Crew	Undisclosed
January 9, 2012	(Colombia) Fernando Cárdenas	(Colombia) América de Cali	New England Revolution	Undisclosed
January 9, 2012	(Colombia) John Lozano	(Colombia) América de Cali	New England Revolution	Undisclosed
January 9, 2012	(Colombia) Rafael Robayo	Unattached	Chicago Fire	Free
January 11, 2012	(Ecuador) Miller Bolaños	(Ecuador) LDU Quito	Chivas USA	Loan
January 11, 2012	(Ecuador) Joao Plata	(Ecuador) LDU Quito	Toronto FC	Undisclosed
January 11, 2012	(Uruguay) Federico Puppo	(Uruguay) Danubio	Chicago Fire	Undisclosed
January 11, 2012	(Denmark) Christian Sivebæk	(Denmark) Midtjylland	Seattle Sounders FC	Undisclosed
January 12, 2012	(United States) Kenny Cooper	Portland Timbers	New York Red Bulls	Trade
January 12, 2012	(Sweden) Markus Holgersson	(Sweden) Helsingborgs IF	New York Red Bulls	Free
January 12, 2012	(Republic of Ireland) Robbie Keane	Los Angeles Galaxy	(England) Aston Villa	Loan
January 13, 2012	(United States) George John	FC Dallas	(England) West Ham United	Loan
January 16, 2012	(United States) Tim Melia	Unattached	Chivas USA	Free
January 17, 2012	(United States) Brad Knighton	(United States) Carolina RailHawks	Vancouver Whitecaps FC	Free
January 17, 2012	(Colombia) Hanyer Mosquera	(Colombia) La Equidad	Portland Timbers	Free
January 18, 2012	(Trinidad and Tobago) Cordell Cato	(Trinidad and Tobago) Defense Force	Seattle Sounders FC	Undisclosed
January 18, 2012	(Brazil) Maicon Santos	Unattached	D.C. United	Free
January 18, 2012	(United States) Michael Thomas	(Sweden) Ljungskile SK	Sporting Kansas City	Undisclosed
January 20, 2012	(United States) Danny Cruz	Houston Dynamo	D.C. United	Trade
January 20, 2012	(Japan) Jun Marques Davidson	(Japan) Tokushima Vortis	Vancouver Whitecaps FC	Undisclosed
January 20, 2012	(United States) Jacob Peterson	Unattached	Sporting Kansas City	Free
January 20, 2012	(Panama) Carlos Rodríguez	(Panama) Tauro	FC Dallas	Undisclosed
January 20, 2012	(Jamaica) Shavar Thomas	Unattached	Montreal Impact	Free
January 24, 2012	(El Salvador) Marvin Iraheta	Unattached	Chivas USA	Free
January 24, 2012	(Colombia) John Alexander Valencia	(Colombia) Atlético Junior	Chivas USA	Undisclosed
January 25, 2012	(Colombia) Jaime Castrillón	(Colombia) Independiente Medellín	Colorado Rapids	Undisclosed
January 25, 2012	(Argentina) Emiliano Dudar	(Switzerland) BSC Young Boys	D.C. United	Free
January 25, 2012	(United States) Jeremy Vuolo	(Finland) AC Oulu	New York Red Bulls	Undisclosed
January 26, 2012	(Cuba) Yordany Álvarez	(United States) Orlando City	Real Salt Lake	Undisclosed
January 26, 2012	(Ecuador) Geovanny Caicedo	(Ecuador) LDU Quito	Toronto FC	Undisclosed
January 26, 2012	(England) Richard Eckersley	Unattached	Toronto FC	Free
January 26, 2012	(Turkey) Sercan Güvenışık	(Germany) SC Preußen Münster	San Jose Earthquakes	Free
January 26, 2012	(United States) Tim Ream	New York Red Bulls	(England) Bolton Wanderers	Undisclosed
January 30, 2012	(Chile) Miguel Aceval	(Chile) Universidad de Concepción	Toronto FC	Undisclosed
January 30, 2012	(Scotland) Kris Boyd	Unattached	Portland Timbers	Free
January 30, 2012	(Colombia) Wilman Conde	(Mexico) Atlas	New York Red Bulls	Undisclosed
January 30, 2012	(Colombia) Faryd Mondragón	Philadelphia Union	(Colombia) Deportivo Cali	Free
January 31, 2012	(France) Sébastien Le Toux	Philadelphia Union	Vancouver Whitecaps FC	Trade
January 31, 2012	(United States) Charles Renken	Unattached	Portland Timbers	Waiver Wire
January 31, 2012	(Colombia) Roger Torres	(Colombia) América de Cali	Philadelphia Union	Undisclosed
February 1, 2012	(United States) Edson Buddle	Unattached	Los Angeles Galaxy	Free
February 1, 2012	(United States) Kyle Nakazawa	Philadelphia Union	Los Angeles Galaxy	Trade
February 2, 2012	(Colombia) José Moreno	(Colombia) Once Caldas	New England Revolution	Loan
February 2, 2012	(Colombia) Tressor Moreno	(Chile) Santiago Wanderers	San Jose Earthquakes	Free
February 2, 2012	(Albania) Hamdi Salihi	(Austria) SK Rapid Wien	D.C. United	Undisclosed
February 6, 2012	(Brazil) Marcelo Saragosa	(Azerbaijan) Ravan Baku	D.C. United	Undisclosed
February 7, 2012	(Brazil) Juninho	(Brazil) São Paulo	Los Angeles Galaxy	Loan
February 7, 2012	(Brazil) Leonardo	(Brazil) São Paulo	Los Angeles Galaxy	Free
February 8, 2012	(Senegal) Macoumba Kandji	Colorado Rapids	Houston Dynamo	Trade
February 8, 2012	(Colombia) Lionard Pajoy	(Colombia) Itagüí Ditaires	Philadelphia Union	Undisclosed
February 9, 2012	(Brazil) Paulo Jr.	(United States) Fort Lauderdale Strikers	Real Salt Lake	Free
February 10, 2012	(Iceland) Victor Pálsson	(Scotland) Hibernian	New York Red Bulls	Undisclosed
February 13, 2012	(United States) Chris Albright	Unattached	Philadelphia Union	Free
February 13, 2012	(France) Saër Sène	(Germany) Bayern Munich	New England Revolution	Free
February 14, 2012	(England) Simon Dawkins	(England) Tottenham Hotspur	San Jose Earthquakes	Loan
February 16, 2012	(United States) Brian Ching	Montreal Impact	Houston Dynamo	Trade
February 16, 2012	(Argentina) Martín Rivero	(Argentina) Rosario Central	Colorado Rapids	Loan
February 16, 2012	(Scotland) Barry Robson	(England) Middlesbrough	Vancouver Whitecaps FC	Free
February 16, 2012	(Cameroon) Franck Songo'o	Unattached	Portland Timbers	Free
February 17, 2012	(United States) Mike Fucito	Seattle Sounders FC	Montreal Impact	Trade
February 17, 2012	(United States) Eddie Johnson	Unattached	Montreal Impact	Allocation
February 17, 2012	(United States) Eddie Johnson	Montreal Impact	Seattle Sounders FC	Trade
February 17, 2012	(United States) Lamar Neagle	Seattle Sounders FC	Montreal Impact	Trade
February 21, 2012	(Cuba) Eduardo Sebrango	Unattached	Montreal Impact	Free
February 22, 2012	(United States) Erich Marscheider	Unattached	Houston Dynamo	Waiver Wire
February 22, 2012	(United States) Rauwshan McKenzie	Unattached	Chivas USA	Free
February 22, 2012	(United States) Cesar Romero	Unattached	Chivas USA	Free
February 22, 2012	(United States) Peter Vagenas	Unattached	Chivas USA	Free
February 24, 2012	(United States) Joe Bendik	Unattached	Portland Timbers	Free
February 24, 2012	(Colombia) Luis Zapata	Unattached	Colorado Rapids	Free
February 27, 2012	(United States) Andrew Dykstra	(United States) Charleston Battery	D.C. United	Free
February 28, 2012	(Malta) Etienne Barbara	Unattached	Vancouver Whitecaps FC	Free
February 29, 2012	(Puerto Rico) Bill Gaudette	Unattached	Los Angeles Galaxy	Free
March 1, 2012	(Italy) Matteo Ferrari	Unattached	Montreal Impact	Free
March 1, 2012	(Northern Ireland) Jonny Steele	Unattached	Real Salt Lake	Free
March 1, 2012	(Japan) Terukazu Tanaka	Unattached	Real Salt Lake	Free
March 2, 2012	(United States) Chris Konopka	Unattached	Philadelphia Union	Free
March 2, 2012	(United States) Lee Nguyen	Vancouver Whitecaps FC	New England Revolution	Waiver Draft
March 2, 2012	(United States) Andrew Weber	Unattached	Seattle Sounders FC	Free
March 5, 2012	(United States) Floyd Franks	(United States) Carolina RailHawks	Vancouver Whitecaps FC	Free
March 6, 2012	(Colombia) José Angulo	(United States) Harrisburg City Islanders	New York Red Bulls	Free
March 6, 2012	(Colombia) Jhonny Arteaga	Unattached	New York Red Bulls	Free
March 6, 2012	(United States) Brandon Barklage	Unattached	New York Red Bulls	Free
March 6, 2012	(United States) Blake Brettschneider	Unattached	New England Revolution	Free
March 6, 2012	(United States) Tyler Ruthven	(United States) Atlanta Silverbacks	New York Red Bulls	Free
March 7, 2012	(Germany) Arne Friedrich	Unattached	Chicago Fire	Free
March 8, 2012	(Italy) Paolo Tornaghi	(Italy) Internazionale	Chicago Fire	Undisclosed
March 9, 2012	(United States) Evan Newton	Unattached	San Jose Earthquakes	Free
March 9, 2012	(United States) Josh Suggs	(United States) Los Angeles Blues	San Jose Earthquakes	Free
March 9, 2012	(United States) Jeremiah White	Unattached	New England Revolution	Free
March 13, 2012	(United States) Alex Caskey	(United States) Charleston Battery	Seattle Sounders FC	Free
March 13, 2012	(United States) Logan Emory	Puerto Rico Islanders	Toronto FC	Free
March 13, 2012	(England) Lewis Neal	(United States) Orlando City	D.C. United	Free
March 13, 2012	(Colombia) Luis Perea	(Peru) Universidad San Martín	FC Dallas	Undisclosed
March 13, 2012	(Trinidad and Tobago) Scott Sealy	Unattached	FC Dallas	Free
March 14, 2012	(Germany) Florian Lechner	Unattached	New England Revolution	Free
March 15, 2012	(Italy) Bernardo Corradi	Unattached	Montreal Impact	Free
March 19, 2012	(United States) Scott Gordon	(United States) Fort Lauderdale Strikers	Chivas USA	Undisclosed
March 19, 2012	(United States) Ryan Maduro	Unattached	New York Red Bulls	Free
March 21, 2012	(El Salvador) Efrain Burgos, Jr.	Unattached	Toronto FC	Free
March 21, 2012	(Montenegro) Nemanja Vuković	Unattached	Columbus Crew	Free
March 23, 2012	(United States) Aaron Schoenfeld	Montreal Impact	Columbus Crew	Trade
March 28, 2012	(United States) Kamani Hill	Unattached	Colorado Rapids	Free
March 28, 2012	(Sweden) Björn Runström	Unattached	New England Revolution	Free
April 5, 2012	(United States) Josh Suggs	San Jose Earthquakes	(United States) Tampa Bay Rowdies	Loan
April 10, 2012	(Uruguay) Paolo Cardozo	Los Angeles Galaxy	Chivas USA	Trade
April 10, 2012	(Brazil) David Lopes	Chivas USA	Los Angeles Galaxy	Trade
April 11, 2012	(Colombia) Hárrison Henao	(Colombia) Once Caldas	Colorado Rapids	Loan
April 12, 2012	(United States) Chris Estridge	Vancouver Whitecaps FC	Real Salt Lake	Trade
April 13, 2012	(Mexico) Óscar Recio	(Mexico) Monterrey	Houston Dynamo	Loan
April 16, 2012	(Germany) Kai Herdling	(Germany) TSG 1899 Hoffenheim	Philadelphia Union	Loan
April 16, 2012	(Colombia) Sebastián Rincón	(Uruguay) Atenas	Portland Timbers	Loan
April 16, 2012	(United States) Chris Rolfe	(Denmark) Aalborg BK	Chicago Fire	Undisclosed
April 17, 2012	(Colombia) José Erick Correa	(Colombia) Boyacá Chicó	Chivas USA	Undisclosed
April 20, 2012	(United States) Mike Fucito	Montreal Impact	Portland Timbers	Trade
April 24, 2012	(United States) Andrew Dykstra	D.C. United	(United States) Charleston Battery	Loan
April 25, 2012	(Scotland) Steven Smith	Unattached	Portland Timbers	Free
April 26, 2012	(Brazil) Alex	(Switzerland) FC Wohlen	Chicago Fire	Undisclosed
April 26, 2012	(Costa Rica) Jairo Arrieta	(Costa Rica) Saprissa	Columbus Crew	Undisclosed
April 26, 2012	(Brazil) Edu	Unattached	Colorado Rapids	Free
May 4, 2012	(Haiti) James Marcelin	Unattached	FC Dallas	Free
May 7, 2012	(Trinidad and Tobago) Chris Birchall	Unattached	Columbus Crew	Free
May 8, 2012	(United States) Bright Dike	Portland Timbers	(United States) Los Angeles Blues	Loan
May 17, 2012	(United States) Juan Agudelo	New York Red Bulls	Chivas USA	Trade
May 17, 2012	(United States) Danny Califf	Philadelphia Union	Chivas USA	Trade
May 17, 2012	(United States) Michael Lahoud	Chivas USA	Philadelphia Union	Trade
May 17, 2012	(United States) Heath Pearce	Chivas USA	New York Red Bulls	Trade
May 24, 2012	(Italy) Marco Di Vaio	(Italy) Bologna	Montreal Impact	Undisclosed
May 29, 2012	(United States) Corey Hertzog	New York Red Bulls	(United States) Wilmington Hammerheads	Loan
June 6, 2012	(Democratic Republic of the Congo) Danny Mwanga	Philadelphia Union	Portland Timbers	Trade
June 6, 2012	(Colombia) Jorge Perlaza	Portland Timbers	Philadelphia Union	Trade
June 7, 2012	(Haiti) Jean Alexandre	San Jose Earthquakes	(United States) Orlando City	Loan
June 7, 2012	(Honduras) Oscar Boniek García	(Honduras) Olimpia	Houston Dynamo	Undisclosed
June 20, 2012	(United States) Moises Hernandez	FC Dallas	(Guatemala) Comunicaciones	Loan
June 20, 2012	(The Gambia) Kenny Mansally	Unattached	Real Salt Lake	Free
June 20, 2012	(United States) Jed Zayner	Unattached	San Jose Earthquakes	Free
June 26, 2012	(Mali) Bakary Soumaré	(France) Boulogne	Philadelphia Union	Undisclosed
June 27, 2012	(United States) Kwame Watson-Siriboe	Chicago Fire	Real Salt Lake	Trade
June 28, 2012	(China) Long Tan	Vancouver Whitecaps FC	D.C. United	Trade
July 5, 2012	(Honduras) Jerry Bengtson	(Honduras) Motagua	New England Revolution	Undisclosed
July 5, 2012	(Japan) Kosuke Kimura	Colorado Rapids	Portland Timbers	Trade
July 5, 2012	(Italy) Alessandro Nesta	Unattached	Montreal Impact	Free
July 6, 2012	(United States) Bobby Burling	Montreal Impact	Chivas USA	Trade
July 6, 2012	(Bosnia and Herzegovina) Neven Marković	Unattached	Sporting Kansas City	Free
July 9, 2012	(United States) Anthony Ampaipitakwong	San Jose Earthquakes	(Thailand) Buriram United	Undisclosed
July 9, 2012	(United States) Bryan Arguez	Montreal Impact	(Canada) FC Edmonton	Loan
July 11, 2012	(United States) Justin Braun	Montreal Impact	Real Salt Lake	Trade
July 11, 2012	(Switzerland) Davide Chiumiento	Vancouver Whitecaps FC	(Switzerland) FC Zurich	Undisclosed
July 11, 2012	(Switzerland) Dennis Iapichino	(Switzerland) FC Lugano	Montreal Impact	Undisclosed
July 11, 2012	(Ecuador) Joao Plata	Toronto FC	(Ecuador) LDU Quito	Loan
July 13, 2012	(Canada) Julian de Guzman	Toronto FC	FC Dallas	Trade
July 13, 2012	(United States) Andrew Dykstra	D.C. United	(United States) Charleston Battery	Loan
July 13, 2012	(Puerto Rico) Bill Gaudette	Los Angeles Galaxy	New York Red Bulls	Trade
July 13, 2012	(France) Sébastien Le Toux	Vancouver Whitecaps FC	New York Red Bulls	Trade
July 13, 2012	(Jamaica) Dane Richards	New York Red Bulls	Vancouver Whitecaps FC	Trade
July 13, 2012	(United States) Brian Rowe	Unattached	Los Angeles Galaxy	Free
July 13, 2012	(China) Long Tan	D.C. United	(United States) Richmond Kickers	Loan
July 13, 2012	(United States) Tyson Wahl	Montreal Impact	Colorado Rapids	Trade
July 13, 2012	(United States) Ethan White	D.C. United	(United States) Richmond Kickers	Loan
July 13, 2012	(United States) Andrew Wiedeman	FC Dallas	Toronto FC	Trade
July 16, 2012	(France) Dimitry Imbongo	(Germany) TSV 1860 München II	New England Revolution	Undisclosed
July 16, 2012	(Scotland) Kenny Miller	(Wales) Cardiff City	Vancouver Whitecaps FC	Undisclosed
July 16, 2012	(Colombia) Miguel Montaño	Montreal Impact	(Colombia) Deportivo Cali	Loan
July 17, 2012	(Brazil) Paulo Jr.	Real Salt Lake	(United States) Ft. Lauderdale Strikers	Loan
July 20, 2012	(France) Eric Hassli	Vancouver Whitecaps FC	Toronto FC	Trade
July 21, 2012	(United States) Quincy Amarikwa	New York Red Bulls	Toronto FC	Trade
July 23, 2012	(Uruguay) Federico Puppo	Chicago Fire	(Uruguay) Defensor Sporting	Loan
July 24, 2012	(Netherlands) Sherjill MacDonald	(Belgium) Beerschot AC	Chicago Fire	Undisclosed
July 26, 2012	(Australia) Tim Cahill	(England) Everton	New York Red Bulls	Undisclosed
July 26, 2012	(Colombia) Rafael Robayo	Chicago Fire	(Colombia) Millonarios	Loan
July 27, 2012	(Uruguay) Álvaro Fernández	Seattle Sounders FC	Chicago Fire	Trade
July 27, 2012	(Argentina) Federico Higuaín	(Argentina) Colón	Columbus Crew	Undisclosed
July 27, 2012	(Germany) Christian Tiffert	(Germany) 1. FC Kaiserslautern	Seattle Sounders FC	Undisclosed
July 28, 2012	(Brazil) Raphael Augusto	(Brazil) Fluminense	D.C. United	Loan
July 30, 2012	(Morocco) Mehdi Ballouchy	New York Red Bulls	San Jose Earthquakes	Trade
July 31, 2012	(United States) Chad Barrett	Los Angeles Galaxy	(Norway) Vålerenga	Loan
July 31, 2012	(Bermuda) Freddy Hall	(England) Northampton Town	Toronto FC	Undisclosed
July 31, 2012	(United States) Babajide Ogunbiyi	Unattached	New York Red Bulls	Free
August 1, 2012	(United States) Blair Gavin	Chivas USA	New England Revolution	Trade
August 1, 2012	(Grenada) Shalrie Joseph	New England Revolution	Chivas USA	Trade
August 1, 2012	(Honduras) Mario Martínez	(Honduras) Real España	Seattle Sounders FC	Loan
August 1, 2012	(Republic of Ireland) Andy O'Brien	(England) Leeds United	Vancouver Whitecaps FC	Undisclosed
August 2, 2012	(Spain) Oriol Rosell	(Spain) FC Barcelona	Sporting Kansas City	Undisclosed
August 3, 2012	(Brazil) Tiago Ulisses	(Brazil) Botafogo	Vancouver Whitecaps FC	Undisclosed
August 3, 2012	(Republic of Ireland) Darren O'Dea	(Scotland) Celtic F.C.	Toronto FC	Undisclosed
August 7, 2012	(Jamaica) Donovan Ricketts	Montreal Impact	Portland Timbers	Trade
August 7, 2012	(United States) Troy Perkins	Portland Timbers	Montreal Impact	Trade
August 8, 2012	(New Zealand) Ian Hogg	(New Zealand) Auckland City	Portland Timbers	Trade
August 9, 2012	(United States) Mike Chabala	Portland Timbers	D.C. United	Trade
August 16, 2012	(United States) Danny Cruz	D.C. United	Philadelphia Union	Trade
August 16, 2012	(Colombia) Lionard Pajoy	Philadelphia Union	D.C. United	Trade
August 16, 2012	(England) Lloyd Sam	(England) Leeds United	New York Red Bulls	Undisclosed
August 17, 2012	(Argentina) Sebastián Grazzini	Chicago Fire	(Argentina) Atlético de Rafaela	Loan
August 20, 2012	(Mexico) Ruben Luna	FC Dallas	(United States) San Antonio Scorpions	Loan
August 21, 2012	(Argentina) Matías Jara	(Argentina) Guillermo Brown	FC Dallas	Undisclosed
August 21, 2012	(Honduras) Hendry Thomas	(England) Wigan Athletic	Colorado Rapids	Undisclosed
August 24, 2012	(Ghana) Michael Tetteh	Seattle Sounders FC	(United States) Fort Lauderdale Strikers	Loan
August 27, 2012	(Colombia) Juan Toja	(Greece) Aris	New England Revolution	Allocation
August 28, 2012	(Poland) Konrad Warzycha	Sporting Kansas City	(United States) Carolina RailHawks	Loan
August 29, 2012	(England) Giles Barnes	(England) Doncaster Rovers	Houston Dynamo	Undisclosed
August 29, 2012	(Iceland) Victor Pálsson	New York Red Bulls	(Netherlands) N.E.C.	Loan
August 30, 2012	(Guatemala) Marco Pappa	Chicago Fire	(Netherlands) SC Heerenveen	Undisclosed
September 5, 2012	(Sweden) Christian Wilhelmsson	(Saudi Arabia) Al-Hilal	Los Angeles Galaxy	Undisclosed
September 10, 2012	(United States) Wells Thompson	Colorado Rapids	Chicago Fire	Trade
September 13, 2012	(Israel) Orr Barouch	Chicago Fire	(Israel) Bnei Yehuda	Loan
September 13, 2012	(United States) Marcus Tracy	Unattached	San Jose Earthquakes	Lottery
September 14, 2012	(Brazil) Digão	Unattached	New York Red Bulls	Free
September 14, 2012	(Mexico) Guillermo Franco	(Mexico) Pachuca	Chicago Fire	Undisclosed
September 14, 2012	(United States) Marcus Hahnemann	Unattached	Seattle Sounders FC	Free
September 14, 2012	(United States) Chris Klute	(United States) Atlanta Silverbacks	Colorado Rapids	Loan
September 14, 2012	(Portugal) David Viana	(Spain) Atlético Madrid	Real Salt Lake	Free

- ^1 Player was never signed, only rights to player were acquired.
- ^2 Player officially joined his new club on January 1, 2012.
- ^3 Player officially joined his new club on June 27, 2012.
