= 2012 New England Revolution season =

New England Revolution
2012 season
- Owner: Robert Kraft
- Coach: Jay Heaps
- Major League Soccer: Conference: 9th Overall: 16th
- MLS Cup: Did not qualify
- U.S. Open Cup: Third round
- Desert Diamond Cup: Runners-up
- Top goalscorer: League: Saër Sène (11); All: Saër Sène (11)
- Highest home attendance: 25,534 v Chicago Fire (October 20)
- Lowest home attendance: 6,149 v Colorado Rapids (May 2)
- Average home league attendance: 14,002
Home colors	Away colors

The 2012 New England Revolution season was the team's seventeenth year of existence, all in Major League Soccer. The team opened its season on March 10 at the San Jose Earthquakes and concluded on October 27 at Montreal Impact. New England's first home league game was March 24 against the Portland Timbers.

== Overview ==
=== Offseason ===
The New England Revolution had plenty of turnover during the offseason after finishing in last place in the Eastern Conference the prior year. The Revolution fired longtime coach Steve Nicol after 10 seasons with the club, and hired former long-time New England Revolution defender Jay Heaps to replace Nicol. Heaps had most recently worked as the color commentator for Revolution broadcasts on Comcast SportsNet New England and 98.5 The Sports Hub.

=== Preseason ===
The New England Revolution started training camp in Arizona culminating with a scrimmage against the PDL club FC Tucson which the Revolution won 2-1. New England then returned home for a few more weeks of training along with two scrimmages against the Boston College Eagles of the NCAA, both of which ended in Revolution victories.

The Revolution then returned to Arizona in order to participate in the 2012 Desert Diamond Cup. Their successful preseason continued with 3 consecutive victories over the Los Angeles Galaxy, New York Red Bulls and Real Salt Lake in order to advance to the Desert Diamond Cup championship game. The Revolution lost the final to the Galaxy, 4 - 2 in a penalty shoot-out.

=== March ===
The Revolution opened the regular season on March 10, 2012 all the way across the country to San Jose, California to face the San Jose Earthquakes. A first half mistake by Revolution captain Shalrie Joseph was converted into a goal by Chris Wondolowski. New England was never able to recover from that mistake and ended up losing their season opener 0-1 to San Jose. One week later, the Revolution traveled to Kansas City, Kansas in order to take on Eastern Conference favorites Sporting Kansas City. Revolution defender Stephen McCarthy was sent off on a controversial tackle in the 14th minute. The Revolution, who were suffering from numerous injuries to their defense corp was unable to survive 76 minutes with only 10 men and ended up losing 0-3 to Sporting Kansas City.

New England had their home opener on Saturday March 24, 2012 against the Portland Timbers at Gillette Stadium. The Revolution came out of the gates fast with a score by new striker Saër Sène in the 1st minute. They were able to shut down the Timbers for the rest of the game and get new head coach Jay Heaps his first MLS victory with a 1-0 result. Once again, the Revolution traveled cross country to Carson, California to face the Los Angeles Galaxy on March 31, 2012. Once again the Revolution scored early off a cross from Shalrie Joseph to rookie Kelyn Rowe for the first goal of his MLS career in the 10th minute. The Revolution attack continued and lead to another goal by Chris Tierney in the 13th minute and added one more to their tally off a Saër Sène goal in the 65th minute. The Galaxy were able to break through and finally score one off the foot of Robbie Keane in the 78th minute, but the Revolution held on to record their 2nd victory of the year, 3-1 over Los Angeles.

== Squad ==
=== Roster ===
Note: Flags indicate national team as defined under FIFA eligibility rules; some limited exceptions apply. Players may hold more than one non-FIFA nationality.

No.	Pos.	Nation	Player
1	GK	USA	Matt Reis
2	DF	GER	Flo Lechner
3	DF	USA	Tyler Polak
5	DF	USA	A. J. Soares
6	MF	USA	Michael Roach
7	MF	USA	Blair Gavin
8	DF	USA	Chris Tierney
11	MF	USA	Kelyn Rowe
13	MF	GUM	Ryan Guy
14	MF	URU	Diego Fagundez
17	MF	GAM	Sainey Nyassi
18	MF	USA	Juan Toja
19	MF	USA	Clyde Simms

No.	Pos.	Nation	Player
22	MF	USA	Benny Feilhaber
23	FW	USA	Blake Brettschneider
24	MF	USA	Lee Nguyen
25	DF	USA	Darrius Barnes
26	MF	USA	Stephen McCarthy
27	FW	HON	Jerry Bengtson
30	DF	USA	Kevin Alston
34	GK	USA	Bobby Shuttleworth
39	FW	FRA	Saër Sène
40	GK	USA	Tim Murray
80	FW	COL	Fernando Cárdenas
92	FW	FRA	Dimitry Imbongo
99	MF	USA	Alec Purdie

Last updated: September 5, 2012.
Source: Official Roster

== Player movement ==
On August 1, 2012, New England would trade their captain Shalrie Joseph to Chivas USA in exchange for Blair Gavin, a second round pick in the 2013 MLS SuperDraft, and allocation money.

=== Transfers ===
==== In ====
Date	Player	Position	Previous club	Fee/notes	Ref
December 12, 2011	(United States) Clyde Simms	MF	(United States) D.C. United	2011 MLS Re-Entry Draft	
January 12, 2012	(United States) Kelyn Rowe	MF	(United States) UCLA	SuperDraft, 1st Round	
January 12, 2012	(United States) Tyler Polak	DF	(United States) Creighton University	SuperDraft, 2nd Round	
July 5, 2012	(Honduras) Jerry Bengtson	FW	(Honduras) CD Motagua	Transfer	
August 1, 2012	(United States) Blair Gavin	MF	(United States) CD Chivas USA	Trade	
	(Germany) Florian Lechner	DF	(Germany) Karlsruher SC	Free transfer	
	(Sweden) Björn Runström	FW	(Sweden) Hammarby IF	Free transfer	
	(France) Dimitry Imbongo	FW	(Germany) TSV 1860 München II	Free transfer	
August 27, 2012	(Colombia) Juan Toja	MF	(Greece) Aris Thessaloniki	Allocation	

==== Out ====
Date	Player	Position	Destination club	Fee/notes	Ref
November 23, 2011	(United States) Alan Koger	FW	unattached	waived	
November 30, 2011	(Morocco) Monsef Zerka	FW	(Romania) FC Petrolul Ploiești |	Option declined	
December 1, 2011	(United States) Ryan Cochrane	DF	San Antonio Scorpions FC	Option declined	
December 1, 2011	(Argentina) Franco Coria	FW	(Argentina) Chacarita Juniors	Option declined	
December 12, 2011	(Zimbabwe) Kheli Dube	FW	Chicago Fire	2011 MLS Re-Entry Draft	
December 12, 2011	(Liberia) Otto Loewy	DF	unattached	waived	
December 12, 2011	(United States) Andrew Sousa	MF	Boston Victory S.C.	waived	
December 31, 2011	(Argentina) Milton Caraglio	FW	(Chile) C.S.D. Rangers	contract not extended	
January 31, 2012	(Denmark) Rajko Lekić	FW	(Denmark) Lyngby BK	Free transfer	
January 31, 2012	(United States) Pat Phelan	MF	(Finland) SJK	Option declined	
March 5, 2012	(United States) Zack Schilawski	FW	Carolina Railhawks	waived	
March 5, 2012	(United States) Ryan Kinne	FW	Connecticut FC Azul	waived	
May 4, 2012	(The Gambia) Kenny Mansally	MF	Real Salt Lake	waived	
June 27, 2012	(Sweden) Björn Runström	FW	unattached	waived	
June 27, 2012	(United States) Jeremiah White	MF	unattached	waived	
June 27, 2012	(Colombia) John Jairo Lozano	DF	unattached	waived	
August 1, 2012	(Grenada) Shalrie Joseph	MF	CD Chivas USA	Trade	
August 6, 2012	(Colombia) José Moreno Mora	FW	unattached	waived	
August 10, 2012	(United States) Zak Boggs	FW	unattached	retired	

== Squad statistics ==
No.	Pos	Nat	Player	Total		Major League Soccer		U.S. Open Cup	
No.	Pos	Nat	Player	Apps	Goals	Apps	Goals	Apps	Goals
1	GK	(United States) USA	Matt Reis	27	0	27	0	0	0
2	DF	(Germany) GER	Flo Lechner	9	0	9	0	0	0
3	DF	(United States) USA	Tyler Polak	2	0	1	0	1	0
4	DF	(Colombia) COL	John Lozano	3	0	2	0	1	0
5	DF	(United States) USA	A.J. Soares	30	1	30	1	0	0
6	MF	(United States) USA	Michael Roach	1	0	0	0	1	0
7	MF	(United States) USA	Blair Gavin	2	0	2	0	0	0
8	MF	(United States) USA	Chris Tierney	28	2	28	2	0	0
9	FW	(Colombia) COL	José Moreno	8	1	7	1	1	0
11	FW	(United States) USA	Kelyn Rowe	31	4	30	3	1	1
13	FW	(Guam) GUM	Ryan Guy	23	1	23	1	0	0
14	MF	(Uruguay) URU	Diego Fagundez	21	2	20	2	1	0
15	MF	(United States) USA	Jeremiah White	3	0	2	0	1	0
17	MF	(The Gambia) GAM	Sainey Nyassi	1	0	1	0	0	0
18	MF	(Colombia) COL	Juan Toja	5	0	5	0	0	0
19	MF	(United States) USA	Clyde Simms	29	0	29	0	0	0
21	MF	(Grenada) GRN	Shalrie Joseph	18	1	18	1	0	0
22	MF	(United States) USA	Benny Feilhaber	30	3	29	2	1	1
23	FW	(United States) USA	Blake Brettschneider	18	2	17	2	1	0
24	MF	(United States) USA	Lee Nguyen	31	6	30	5	1	1
25	DF	(United States) USA	Darrius Barnes	14	1	13	1	1	0
26	DF	(United States) USA	Stephen McCarthy	28	0	28	0	0	0
27	FW	(Honduras) HON	Jerry Bengtson	13	2	13	2	0	0
30	MF	(United States) USA	Kevin Alston	31	0	31	0	0	0
32	FW	(Sweden) SWE	Björn Runström	3	0	3	0	0	0
33	FW	(United States) USA	Zak Boggs	0	0	0	0	0	0
34	GK	(United States) USA	Bobby Shuttleworth	8	0	7	0	1	0
39	FW	(France) FRA	Saër Sène	25	11	25	11	0	0
40	GK	(United States) USA	Tim Murray	0	0	0	0	0	0
80	FW	(Colombia) COL	Fernando Cárdenas	28	2	27	2	1	0
32	FW	(France) FRA	Dimitry Imbongo	9	1	9	1	0	0
99	MF	(United States) USA	Alec Purdie	6	0	5	0	1	0

Updated to match played September 25, 2012
Source: New England Revolution 2012

== Competitions ==
=== Preseason ===
January 29, 2012 Scrimmage	New England Revolution	2–1	FC Tucson	Casa Grande, Arizona
?	Nyassi 38'; Mansally 89'	Report	Dragiz 101'	Stadium: Grande Sports World; Attendance: ?

February 10, 2012 Scrimmage	New England Revolution	3–0	Boston College Eagles	Foxborough, Massachusetts
2:00 EST	Rowe 7', 54'; Roach 89'	Report		Stadium: Gillette Stadium; Attendance: ?

February 15, 2012 Scrimmage	New England Revolution	2–1	Boston College Eagles	Foxborough, Massachusetts
1:30 EST	Purdie 28'; Joseph 52'	Report	Medina-Mendez 28'	Stadium: Gillette Stadium; Attendance: ?

=== Desert Diamond Cup ===
==== Standings ====
Pos	Team	Pld	W	L	D	GF	GA	GD	Pts
1	New England Revolution	3	3	0	0	7	3	+4	9
2	LA Galaxy	3	1	2	0	5	5	0	3
3	New York Red Bulls	3	1	2	0	2	4	−2	3
4	Real Salt Lake	3	1	2	0	2	4	−2	3

==== Matches ====
February 22, 2012 Group	New England Revolution	3–2	LA Galaxy	Tucson, Arizona
20:00 EST	Feilhaber 2'; Lozano 36'; White 74'	Report	Buddle 31'; Magee 38'	Stadium: Kino Stadium; Attendance: 5,547

February 26, 2012 Group	New England Revolution	2–0	New York Red Bulls	Tucson, Arizona
22:00 PST	Lechner (yellow card) 56'; Smith (yellow card) 67'; Rowe 77', 84'	Report	Ruthven (yellow card) 16'; Conde (yellow card) 32'	Stadium: Kino Stadium; Referee: Tyler Ploeger

February 29, 2012 Group	Real Salt Lake	1 - 2	New England Revolution	Tucson, Arizona
20:00 EST	Nico Muniz 11'	Report	Fagundez 8'; Runstrom 56'	Stadium: Kino Stadium; Attendance: 6,212

March 3, 2012 Final	Los Angeles Galaxy	0–0 (2–4 p)	New England Revolution	Tucson, Arizona
22:00 EST		Report		Stadium: Kino Stadium
	Penalties
	Guy (penalty missed); Reis (penalty scored); Joseph (penalty scored); Feilhaber (penalty missed)		(penalty scored) Cardozo; (penalty missed) Stephens; (penalty scored) Jimenez; (penalty scored) Walker; (penalty scored) Sarvas

=== Major League Soccer ===
Kickoff times are in EDT.

March 10, 2012 Match 1	San Jose Earthquakes	1–0	New England Revolution	San Jose, California
22:30	Wondolowski 16'; Baca (yellow card) 20'; Lenhart (yellow card) 41'	Report	Lozano (yellow card) 59'	Stadium: Buck Shaw Stadium; Attendance: 10,525; Referee: Jorge Mendoza

March 17, 2012 Match 2	Sporting Kansas City	3–0	New England Revolution	Kansas City, Kansas
16:30	Zusi 28', (yellow card) 28'; Kamara 39'; Myers (yellow card) 45'; Sapong 47'	Report	McCarthy (red card) 14'	Stadium: LIVESTRONG Sporting Park; Attendance: 19,777; Referee: S. Petrescu

March 24, 2012 Match 3	New England Revolution	1–0	Portland Timbers	Foxborough, Massachusetts
16:00	Sène 1'; Tierney (yellow card) 18'	Report	Jewsbury (yellow card) 16'; Palmer (yellow card) 35'; Songo'o (yellow card) 65'	Stadium: Gillette Stadium; Attendance: 12,935; Referee: Hilario Grajeda

March 31, 2012 Match 4	Los Angeles Galaxy	1–3	New England Revolution	Carson, California
23:00	Keane 78'	Report; Live TV: NBC Sports	Rowe 10'; Tierney 13'; Sène 65'	Stadium: Home Depot Center; Attendance: 21,324; Referee: Ricardo Salazar

April 5, 2012 Match 5	FC Dallas	1–0	New England Revolution	Frisco, Texas
20:30	Ihemelu 95+'	Report	Joseph (yellow card) 64'; Tierney (yellow card) 79'	Stadium: FC Dallas Stadium; Attendance: 11,043; Referee: Juan Guzman

April 14, 2012 Match 6	New England Revolution	1–2	D.C. United	Foxborough, Massachusetts
16:00	Moreno 6'; Feilhaber (yellow card) 92+'	Report	Santos 19'; McDonald (yellow card) 33'; Kitchen (yellow card) 73'; Pontius 82'	Stadium: Gillette Stadium; Attendance: 10,389; Referee: Jorge Gonzalez

April 28, 2012 Match 7	New York Red Bulls	1–0	New England Revolution	Harrison, New Jersey
15:30	Henry 7'; Ruthven (yellow card) 18'	Report; Live TV: NBC Sports	Joseph (yellow card) 19'	Stadium: Red Bull Arena; Attendance: 18,152; Referee: Jair Marrufo

May 2, 2012 Match 8	New England Revolution	2–1	Colorado Rapids	Foxborough, Massachusetts
20:00	Sène 27'; Cárdenas 39'; Feilhaber (yellow card) 66'; Barnes (yellow card) 74'; Nguyen (yellow card) 76'	Report	Castrillon 21', (yellow card) 90'; Marshall (yellow card) 45'	Stadium: Gillette Stadium; Attendance: 6,149; Referee: Terry Vaughn

May 5, 2012 Match 9	Real Salt Lake	2–1	New England Revolution	Sandy, Utah
21:00	Saborio 33', 55'; Olave (yellow card) 36'; Johnson (yellow card) 59'; Saborio (yellow card) 95+'	Report	Brettschneider 22'; Tierney (yellow card) 57'; Cárdenas (red card)	Stadium: Rio Tinto Stadium; Attendance: 18,219; Referee: David Gantar

May 12, 2012 Match 10	New England Revolution	4–1	Vancouver Whitecaps FC	Foxborough, Massachusetts
19:30	Nguyen 6', 72'; Sène 24'; Joseph 33' (yellow card) 45+'; McCarthy (yellow card) 90'	Report	Hassli 5' (yellow card) 90'; Koffie (yellow card) 44'; Salgado (yellow card) 61'; Mattocks (yellow card) 64'	Stadium: Gillette Stadium; Attendance: 12,112; Referee: Silviu Petrescu

May 19, 2012 Match 11	New England Revolution	2–2	Houston Dynamo	Foxborough, Massachusetts
19:30	Sène 26' (pen.), 57'; Feilhaber (yellow card) 65'	Report	Bruin 32'; Carr (yellow card) 63'; Boswell (yellow card) 64'; Camargo 87'	Stadium: Gillette Stadium; Attendance: 16,414; Referee: Baldomero Toledo

May 26, 2012 Match 12	D.C. United	3–2	New England Revolution	Washington, D.C.
19:30	McDonald 15'; Jakovic 45+' (yellow card) 87'; Santos 61'	Report	Sène 48'; Soares 50'	Stadium: RFK Memorial Stadium; Attendance: 14,627; Referee: Kevin Stott

June 2, 2012 Match 13	New England Revolution	2–0	Chicago Fire	Foxborough, Massachusetts
19:30	Rowe 69'; Feilhaber 73'	Report	Barouch (yellow card) 60'	Stadium: Gillette Stadium; Attendance: 12,523; Referee: Fotis Bazakos

June 16, 2012 Match 14	New England Revolution	0–0	Columbus Crew	Foxborough, Massachusetts
19:30	Soares (yellow card) 21'; Moreno (yellow card) 43'	Report	Miranda (yellow card) 62'	Stadium: Gillette Stadium; Attendance: 12,218; Referee: Hilario Grajeda

June 23, 2012 Match 15	Toronto FC	2–2	New England Revolution	Toronto, Ontario
16:30	Kovermans 4' (yellow card) 49'; Johnson 42'; Henry (yellow card) 73'	Report	Alston (yellow card) 31'; Brettschneider 71'; Tierney (yellow card) 79' (goal) 94+'	Stadium: BMO Field; Attendance: 18,877; Referee: Juan Guzman

June 30, 2012 Match 16	New England Revolution	2–2	Seattle Sounders FC	Foxborough, Massachusetts
19:30	Sène 12'; Fagundez 94+'	Report	Rose (yellow card) 18'; Johnson 23', 35'; Alonso (yellow card) 50'; González (yellow card) 90'	Stadium: Gillette Stadium; Attendance: 15,264; Referee: Edvin Jurisevic

July 8, 2012 Match 17	New England Revolution	2–0	Red Bull New York	Foxborough, Massachusetts
19:00	Nguyen 24'; Bengtson 84'	Report	Richards (yellow card) 9'; Miller (yellow card) 45+'; Lindpere (yellow card) 67'	Stadium: Gillette Stadium; Attendance: 14,374; Referee: Drew Fischer

July 14, 2012 Match 18	New England Revolution	0 - 1	Toronto FC	Foxborough, Massachusetts
19:30	Joseph (yellow card) 84'	Report	Silva 8'; Lambe (yellow card) 28'; Dunfield (yellow card) 84'; Morgan (yellow card) 90'	Stadium: Gillette Stadium; Attendance: 12,180; Referee: Hilario Grajeda

July 18, 2012 Match 19	Montreal Impact	2 - 1	New England Revolution	Montreal, Quebec
20:00	Bernier 28' (pen.); Nyassi 67'	Report	Nguyen (yellow card) 39' (goal) 44'	Stadium: Stade Saputo; Attendance: 15,615; Referee: Fotis Barakos

July 21, 2012 Match 20	Sporting Kansas City	0 - 0	New England Revolution	Kansas City, Kansas
20:30	Harrington (yellow card) 50'; Besler (yellow card) 66'	Report	Barnes (yellow card) 47'	Stadium: LIVESTRONG Sporting Park; Attendance: 19,080; Referee: Jasen Anno

July 29, 2012 Match 21	Philadelphia Union	2 - 1	New England Revolution	Chester, Pennsylvania
19:00	Adu 59' (pen.); Farfan (yellow card) 67'; McInereney 90'	Report	Sène 12'; Soares (yellow card) 25'; McCarthy (yellow card) 39'	Stadium: PPL Park; Attendance: 18,938; Referee: Edvin Jurisevic

August 4, 2012 Match 22	New England Revolution	0 - 1	Sporting Kansas City	Foxborough, Massachusetts
19:30	Guy (yellow card) 54'; Feilhaber (yellow card) 77'	Report	Bunbury 20'; Olum (yellow card) 56'; Besler (yellow card) 88'	Stadium: Gillette Stadium; Attendance: 17,592; Referee: Geoff Gamble

August 12, 2012 Match 23	New England Revolution	0 - 1	Montreal Impact	Foxborough, Massachusetts
19:00	Soares (yellow card) 77'	Report	Bernier (yellow card) 7'; Nyassi 61' (yellow card) 86'; Iapichino (yellow card) 89'	Stadium: Gillette Stadium; Attendance: 12,857; Referee: Allen Chapman

August 18, 2012 Match 24	Chicago Fire	2 - 1	New England Revolution	Bridgeview, Illinois
20:30	Rolfe 5' (pen.); MacDonald 25'; Johnson (yellow card) 89'	Report	Cárdenas 11'; Guy (yellow card) 69'	Stadium: Toyota Park; Attendance: 17,495; Referee: Sorin Stoica

August 25, 2012 Match 25	Columbus Crew	4 - 3	New England Revolution	Columbus, Ohio
19:30	Higuain 26', 43'; Arrieta 32', 86'	Report	Guy 17'; Bengtson 23'; Nguyen 81' (pen.); Alson (yellow card) 70'	Stadium: Columbus Crew Stadium; Attendance: 13,651; Referee: Armando Villarreal

August 29, 2012 Match 26	New England Revolution	3 - 3	Chivas USA	Foxborough, Massachusetts
20:00	Sène 4', 21'; McKenzie 11' (o.g.); Alston (yellow card) 44'	Report	Joseph 23', 45+'; Bolanos 47'; Califf (yellow card) 60'	Stadium: Gillette Stadium; Attendance: 10,945; Referee: Matthew Foerster

September 1, 2012 Match 27	New England Revolution	0 - 0	Philadelphia Union	Foxborough, Massachusetts
19:30	Nguyen (yellow card) 58'	Summary	Adu (yellow card) 62'	Stadium: Gillette Stadium; Attendance: 11,841; Referee: Drew Fischer

September 05, 2012 Match 28	New England Revolution	2 - 0	Columbus Crew	Foxborough, Massachusetts
20:00	Imbongo 53', (yellow card) 53'; Marshall 74' (o.g.)	Report	O'Rourke (yellow card) 94+'	Stadium: Gillette Stadium; Attendance: 10,345; Referee: Geoff Gamble

September 15, 2012 Match 29	D.C. United	2 - 1	New England Revolution	Washington, D.C.
19:30	Pontius 32'; Korb (yellow card) 54'; Neal 63'; Santos (yellow card) 64'; Pajoy (yellow card) 77'	Report	Rowe 29'; Simms (yellow card) 65'	Stadium: RFK Memorial Stadium; Attendance: 15,104; Referee: Fotis Bazakos

September 22, 2012 Match 30	New England Revolution	1 - 1	New York Red Bulls	Foxborough, Massachusetts
19:30	Rowe (yellow card) 58'; Barnes (yellow card) 62' (goal) 95+'	Report	Lade (yellow card) 54' (yellow-red card) 74'; Tainio (yellow card) 62'; Conde (yellow card) 68'; Gaudette (yellow card) 88'; Lindpere 91+'	Stadium: Gillette Stadium; Attendance: 24,364; Referee: Sorin Stoica

September 29, 2012 Match 31	Houston Dynamo	2 - 0	New England Revolution	Houston, Texas
20:30	Boswell (yellow card) 60'; Bruin (yellow card) 62'; Clark 77'; García 93+'	Report	Cárdenas (yellow card) 54'; Imbongo (yellow card) 62'; Toja (yellow card) 68'	Stadium: BBVA Compass Stadium; Attendance: 22,039; Referee: Drew Fischer

October 6, 2012 Match 32	Philadelphia Union	1 - 0	New England Revolution	Chester, Pennsylvania
19:00	McInerney 73'; Farfan (yellow card) 87'	Report	Simms (yellow card) 66'; Feilhaber (yellow card) 86' (yellow-red card) 88'; Guy (yellow card) 86'	Stadium: PPL Park; Attendance: 17,079; Referee: Jorge Gonzalez

October 20, 2012 Match 33	New England Revolution	1 - 0	Chicago Fire	Foxborough, Massachusetts
19:30	Fagundez 17'; Bengtson (yellow card) 44'	Report	MacDonald (yellow card) 67'	Stadium: Gillette Stadium; Attendance: 25,534; Referee: Kevin Scott

October 27, 2012 Match 34	Montreal Impact	0 - 1	New England Revolution	Montreal, Quebec
14:00		Report	Soares 88'	Stadium: Stade Saputo; Attendance: 19,998; Referee: Jorge Gonzalez

==== Standings ====
===== Eastern Conference =====
Pos	Team	Pld	W	L	T	GF	GA	GD	Pts	Qualification
1	Sporting Kansas City	34	18	7	9	42	27	+15	63	Qualification for the conference semifinals
2	D.C. United	34	17	10	7	53	43	+10	58	Qualification for the conference semifinals
3	New York Red Bulls	34	16	9	9	57	46	+11	57	Qualification for the conference semifinals
4	Chicago Fire	34	17	11	6	46	41	+5	57	Qualification for the knockout round
5	Houston Dynamo	34	14	9	11	48	41	+7	53	Qualification for the knockout round
6	Columbus Crew	34	15	12	7	44	44	0	52	
7	Montreal Impact	34	12	16	6	45	51	−6	42	
8	Philadelphia Union	34	10	18	6	37	45	−8	36	
9	New England Revolution	34	9	17	8	39	44	−5	35	
10	Toronto FC	34	5	21	8	36	62	−26	23	

Source: MLS

===== Overall table =====
Note: the table below has no impact on playoff qualification and is used solely for determining host of the MLS Cup, certain CCL spots, and 2013 MLS draft. The conference tables are the sole determinant for teams qualifying to the playoffs

Pos	Team	Pld	W	L	T	GF	GA	GD	Pts	
1	San Jose Earthquakes (S)	34	19	6	9	72	43	+29	66	Qualification for the CONCACAF Champions League
2	Sporting Kansas City (U)	34	18	7	9	42	27	+15	63	Qualification for the CONCACAF Champions League
3	D.C. United	34	17	10	7	53	43	+10	58	
4	New York Red Bulls	34	16	9	9	57	46	+11	57	
5	Real Salt Lake	34	17	11	6	46	35	+11	57	
6	Chicago Fire	34	17	11	6	46	41	+5	57	
7	Seattle Sounders FC	34	15	8	11	51	33	+18	56	
8	LA Galaxy (C)	34	16	12	6	59	47	+12	54	Qualification for the CONCACAF Champions League
9	Houston Dynamo	34	14	9	11	48	41	+7	53	Qualification for the CONCACAF Champions League
10	Columbus Crew	34	15	12	7	44	44	0	52	
11	Vancouver Whitecaps FC	34	11	13	10	35	41	−6	43	
12	Montreal Impact	34	12	16	6	45	51	−6	42	Qualification for the CONCACAF Champions League
13	FC Dallas	34	9	13	12	42	47	−5	39	
14	Colorado Rapids	34	11	19	4	44	50	−6	37	
15	Philadelphia Union	34	10	18	6	37	45	−8	36	
16	New England Revolution	34	9	17	8	39	44	−5	35	
17	Portland Timbers	34	8	16	10	34	56	−22	34	
18	Chivas USA	34	7	18	9	24	58	−34	30	
19	Toronto FC (V)	34	5	21	8	36	62	−26	23	

Source: MLS
Rules for classification: 1) points; 2) head-to-head record; 3) goal difference; 4) number of goals scored
(C) MLS Cup champions; (S) Supporters' Shield winners; (U) U.S. Open Cup winners; (V) Canadian Championship winners

===== Results summary =====
Overall								Home						Away					
Pld	Pts	W	L	T	GF	GA	GD	W	L	T	GF	GA	GD	W	L	T	GF	GA	GD
34	35	9	17	8	38	44	−6	7	4	6	22	15	+7	2	13	2	16	29	−13

Last updated: October 25, 2012
Pld = Matches played; Pts = Points; W = Matches won; T = Matches tied; L = Matches lost; GF = Goals for; GA = Goals against; GD = Goal difference

===== Results by round =====
Round	1	2	3	4	5	6	7	8	9	10	11	12	13	14	15	16	17	18	19	20	21	22	23	24	25	26	27	28	29	30	31	32	33	34
Stadium	A	A	H	A	A	H	A	H	A	H	H	A	H	H	A	H	H	H	A	A	A	H	H	A	A	H	H	H	A	H	A	A	H	A
Result	L	L	W	W	L	L	L	W	L	W	D	L	W	D	D	D	W	L	L	D	L	L	L	L	L	D	W	D	D	L	L	L	W	W
Position																							16	17	17	18	18	14						

Updated to match(es) played on September 1, 2012. Source:
A = Away; H = Home; W = Win; D = Draw; L = Loss

=== U.S. Open Cup ===
May 29, 2012 R3	Harrisburg City Islanders	3–3 (4–3 p)	New England Revolution	Harrisburg, PA
19:00	Touray (yellow card) 11', (goal) 117'; Pelletier (yellow card) 45'; Ombiji (yellow card) 89', (goal) 111'; Noone 120'	Report	Jeremiah White (yellow card) 17'; Diego Fagundez (red card) 36'; Rowe 95'; Nguyen 100' (pen.); Feilhaber 103'	Stadium: Skyline Sports Complex; Attendance: 441; Referee: Ayodeji Obisesan
	Penalties
	(penalty missed) Noone; (penalty scored) Basso; (penalty scored) Duckett; (penalty scored) Yates; (penalty scored) Marshall		Nguyen (penalty scored); Rowe (penalty missed); Roach (penalty scored); Brettschneider (penalty scored); Feilhaber (penalty missed)

== Miscellany ==
=== Allocation ranking ===
New England is in the #19 position in the MLS Allocation Ranking. The allocation ranking is the mechanism used to determine which MLS club has first priority to acquire a U.S. National Team player who signs with MLS after playing abroad, or a former MLS player who returns to the league after having gone to a club abroad for a transfer fee. A ranking can be traded, provided that part of the compensation received in return is another club's ranking. New England held the #1 position until they selected Juan Toja, which dropped them to the bottom of the order.

=== International roster spots ===
New England has 8 MLS International Roster Slots for use in the 2012 season. Each club in Major League Soccer is allocated 8 international roster spots and no New England trades have been reported.

=== Future draft pick trades ===
Future picks acquired: *2013 MLS SuperDraft Round 2 pick from D.C. United; *2013 MLS SuperDraft Round 2 pick from Chivas USA.
Future picks traded: None.
