= Pepe Moreno =

Pepe Moreno may refer to:

- Pepe Moreno (comics) (born 1959), Spanish comic book artist and writer
- Pepe Moreno (footballer) (born 1981), Colombian footballer

== See also ==
- Jose Moreno (disambiguation)
