= Hell Cab =

1993 video game

- Developer: Digital Fusion
- Publisher: Time Warner
- Platforms: Macintosh, Windows
- Release: 1993
- Genre: Adventure

Hell Cab is a 1993 adventure video game developed by Digital Fusion and published by Time Warner in 1993 for Macintosh, Windows 3.x.

== Development ==
Developed by Pepe Moreno, the game was intended as a showpiece for both Time Warner and Moreno. At the time, the Time Warner Interactive Group (formerly Warner New Media), was developing, acquiring, and distributing CD-ROM titles for the consumer market. This was Jules Urbach's first game, made when he was just 18, and it became one of the first CD-ROM games ever created. Beginning his career in art and comics, Moreno saw potential in the interactive media as an expression of true creativity.

== Reception ==
Computer Gaming World in November 1993 criticised Hell Cab's "very slow" CD and QuickTime streaming speed, stating that the delays interrupted the player's immersion. The magazine described the software as "more like an interactive tour book and variety show lumped into one" than a game, and concluded with a hope that as technology improved "Moreno will be able to create a world of sight and sounds that truly entertain and offer smoother immersion into his creative vision". In April 1994 the magazine said that Hell Cab was "a case of new technology meeting old game design ... we were enamored of the graphics but less than enchanted with some of the game play". PC Mag wrote that it was a "tempting treat". In a full-page review, Score gave the game a rating of 61%. Variety determined it was the most talked about of all the new releases in January 1993. Wired felt that some of the game's animations and music were too repetitive. In a retrospective review, The Obscuritory characterized the game's "tone-setting and breakneck linearity" as reminiscent of a theme park ride.

James V. Trunzo reviewed Hellcab in White Wolf #44 (June, 1994), giving it a final evaluation of "Very Good" and stated that "All in all, Hellcab is an adventure worth playing, especially if you have a fast CD-ROM or a ton of patience. The game's graphics and sound along make it worth experiencing, and the unique plot takes Hellcab out of the realm of the ordinary."
