= Batman: Digital Justice =

Graphic novel published by DC Comics in 1990

- Cover of Batman: Digital Justice one-shot, art by Pepe Moreno.

Publication information
- Publisher: DC Comics
- Format: One-shot
- Genre: Crime, superhero, cyberpunk, dystopian fiction
- Publication date: April 1990
- No. of issues: 1
- Main character: James Gordon

Creative team
- Created by: Pepe Moreno
- Written by: Pepe Moreno; Doug Murray
- Artist: Pepe Moreno; Bob Fingerman
- Editor: Denny O'Neil

Collected editions
- Batman: Digital Justice: ISBN 0-930289-87-0

Batman: Digital Justice is a graphic novel published by DC Comics in 1990 in both hardback and paperback forms. It was written and illustrated by Pepe Moreno entirely using computer graphics, software and techniques. The story takes place outside regular DC continuity, but is not an Elseworlds title.

== Plot summary ==
The book is set in a future Gotham City "at the end of the next century" (the 21st) dominated by high technology, particularly computer networks and their human controllers, long after the original Batman has died. The story revolves around James Gordon, Gotham City Police Department detective and grandson of Commissioner James Gordon, who takes on the identity of the Batman to free the city from a sentient computer virus crafted by the Joker, also now long dead; and to avenge the death of his partner Lena Schwartz. He is aided by a self-aware computer called the Batcomp, programmed by the late Bruce Wayne, and a robot called Alfred (after Wayne's also deceased butler Alfred Pennyworth), both residing in the Batcave under a now long-abandoned Wayne Manor. Joining Gordon in his new crusade against crime and the city's corrupt government are a teenage street-punk informant named Robert Chang, who becomes the new Robin; and a female pop music superstar named Sheila Romero (stage name Gata), who becomes the new Catwoman and, while being his adversary at first, eventually becomes Gordon's lover and ally.

== Production and technology ==
Batman: Digital Justice is historically significant as one of the earliest mainstream graphic novels to be created entirely using digital computer tools. Author and artist Pepe Moreno, alongside writer Doug Murray and assistant Bob Fingerman, produced the book over a two-year period using early desktop publishing computers, specifically the Macintosh II and Amiga platforms. Moreno utilized early 3D rendering and pixel-art software, including MacPaint and Deluxe Paint, to construct the futuristic cyber-dystopian landscapes of Gotham Megatropolis. The production process was highly documented by Moreno, who described his team as "bohemian technocrats" pioneering a brand new artistic medium that merged sequential art with emerging information technology.

== Characters ==
- James Gordon / Batman
- Lena Schwartz
- Robert Chang / Robin
- Harold Grover
- Paul Fahmy / Know Man
- Sheila Romero / Gata/Catwoman
- Maria Romero / Madam X
- Luke Krater / Law Man
- Hiroshi Basho / Mob Lord
- Jackie Becker / Media Man
