= Jose Moreno =

José Moreno may refer to:

== Arts and entertainment ==
- José Moreno Carbonero (1858–1942), Spanish painter and decorator
- José Moreno Villa (1887–1955), Spanish poet
- José Moreno Gans (1897–1976), Spanish composer
- José Elías Moreno (1910–1969), Mexican character actor
- Pitoy Moreno (Jose Reyes Moreno Jr., 1925–2018), Filipino fashion designer
- José Miguel Moreno (born 1946), Spanish guitarist
- Jose Moreno Brooks (born 1985), American actor

== Sports ==
- José Manuel Moreno (1916–1978), nicknamed "El Charro", Argentine football player
- José Moreno (tennis) (born 1952), Spanish tennis player
- José Moreno (baseball) (1957–2019), Dominican MLB player
- José Moreno (Ecuadorian footballer) (born 1962), Ecuadorian footballer
- José Manuel Moreno (cyclist) (born 1969), Spanish cyclist and Olympic Champion
- Walter José Moreno (born 1978), Colombian football player
- José Moreno Mora (born 1981), Colombian footballer
- José Moreno Sánchez (born 1993), Spanish racing cyclist

== Others ==
- José María Moreno (born 1951), Spanish poet, translator, and teacher

== See also ==
- Pepe Moreno (disambiguation)
