= Jay Heaps =

American soccer player (born 1976)

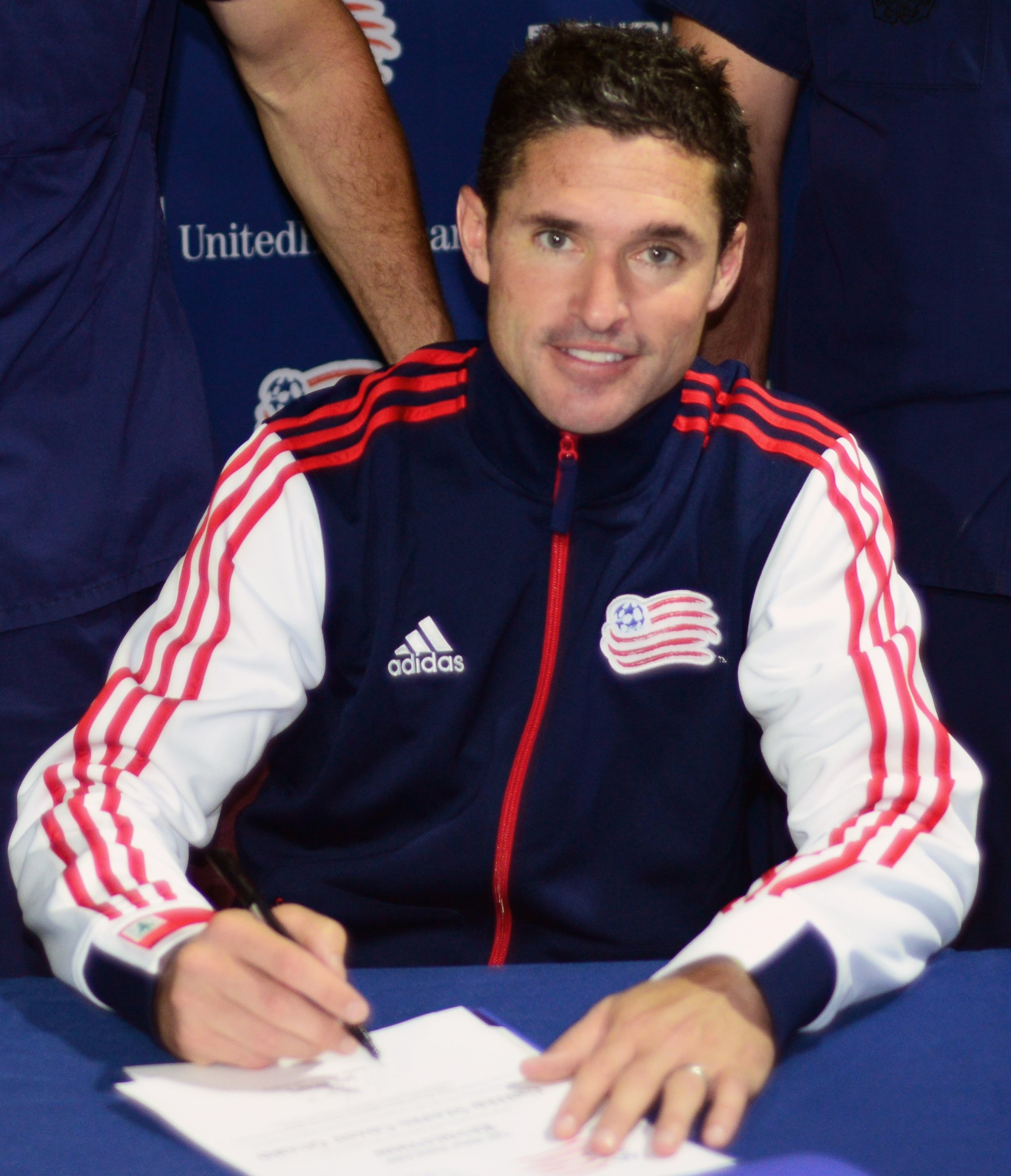
- Heaps in 2013

Personal information
- Full name: John Franklin Heaps III
- Date of birth: August 2, 1976 (age 50)
- Place of birth: Nashua, New Hampshire, U.S.
- Height: 5 ft 9 in (1.75 m)
- Position: Defender

College career
Years	Team	Apps	(Gls)
1995–1998	Duke Blue Devils	83	(45)

Senior career*
Years	Team	Apps	(Gls)
1999–2001	Miami Fusion	71	(8)
2001–2009	New England Revolution	243	(9)
Total		314	(17)

International career
2009	United States	4	(0)

Managerial career
- 2011–2017: New England Revolution
- 2026–: Birmingham Legion FC
Medal record
Representing United States
Runner-up	CONCACAF Gold Cup	2009
Men's Soccer
- * Club domestic league appearances and goals

John Franklin "Jay" Heaps (born August 2, 1976) is an American former soccer player who currently serves as general manager and head coach of Birmingham Legion FC. He is a former head coach for the New England Revolution in Major League Soccer.

After a successful college career at Duke University, Heaps spent his entire professional playing career in Major League Soccer, initially with Miami Fusion, and then with New England Revolution, for whom he made over 250 appearances in all competitions. Towards the end of his career Heaps also played with the United States men's national soccer team, earning four caps at the 2009 CONCACAF Gold Cup. He was coach of the New England Revolution from 2011 to 2017. He was also part of the Lamar Hunt U.S. Open Cup winning 2007 roster and was part of the 2008 North American SuperLiga winning roster. He was on the Miami Fusion team from 1999 to 2001. He then played for the New England Revolution from 2001 to 2009. He won Defender of the Year in 2009 for the New England Revolution.

== Career ==
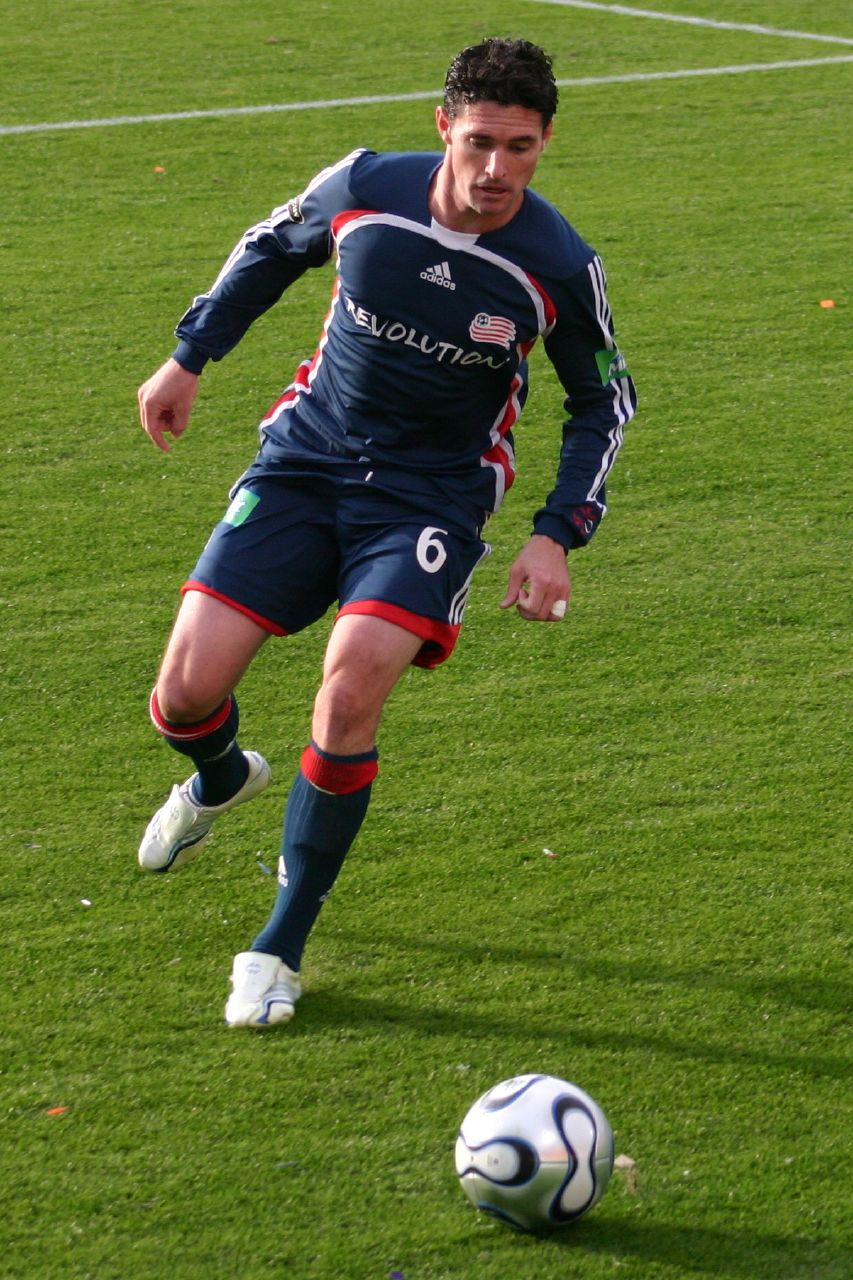
Heaps playing in the 2006 MLS Cup

=== College ===
Heaps grew up in Longmeadow, Massachusetts, and graduated from Longmeadow High School. He played college soccer for the Duke University Blue Devils from 1995 to 1998. He was named first team All-ACC all four of his years, was a three-time finalist for the Hermann Award, and as a senior was awarded the Hermann Trophy by the Missouri Athletic Club, marking him as the nation's top college player. During his four years at Duke, he had 45 goals and 37 assists across 83 appearances. Additionally, Heaps played for the Duke Blue Devils men's basketball team under Mike Krzyzewski from 1996 to 1999. He appeared in 27 games and played 68 minutes total.

=== Professional ===
After graduating from Duke, Heaps was drafted second overall in the 1999 MLS College Draft by Miami Fusion, and was named MLS Rookie of the Year after playing 2511 minutes for the team in midfield and defense. In his second year, Heaps was named an MLS All-Star, while registering 5 goals and six assists for the Fusion in 29 starts.

On June 20, 2001, Heaps was traded to the New England Revolution, along with a second-round pick in the 2003 MLS SuperDraft in exchange for defender Brian Dunseth and a first-round pick in the 2003 MLS SuperDraft. He made his Revolution debut the same day, coming on as a 46th-minute substitute for Matt Okoh in a 3-3 overtime draw against the Colorado Rapids. Heaps made his first Revolution start on July 4, 2001, in a 1-1 draw against the Dallas Burn, and his home debut three days later, on July 7, in a 2-1 loss to the Kansas City Wizards.

In 2002, Heaps made 27 appearances for the Revolution (26 starts), scoring 2 goals and recording 6 assists. His first Revolution goal came on June 22, 2002, in a 3-2 loss to the Kansas City Wizards. He started six matches of the Revolution's 2002 MLS Cup playoffs campaign, scoring the Revolution's only goal in game 2 of the Eastern Conference Final against the Columbus Crew on October 9 (which was also Columbus Day), giving the Revolution their first away playoff win in club history. Heaps was ejected from the match in the 39th minute after a clash with Freddy García, but returned to the lineup for MLS Cup 2002.

Heaps went on to become a mainstay in the Revolution backline over the next seven seasons, leading the team in minutes played and matches started in both 2003 and 2008, and helping the club reach three more MLS Cup finals, all of which he started. Heaps also helped the club win their first two pieces of silverware, in the form of the 2007 U.S. Open Cup and the 2008 North American SuperLiga, though he missed the final due to a red card in the semifinal.

In the 2006 MLS Cup Championship, Heaps' penalty kick was saved by Pat Onstad, winning the championship for the opposing Houston Dynamo.

In 2009, Heaps was named Revolution team Defender of the Year. He announced his retirement from soccer at the end of the season, on December 3, 2009. In total, Heaps appeared in 304 MLS matches, and retired holding the Revolution team records for games played, games started, and minutes played, ranking in the top 10 in league history in those categories.

In November 2011, Heaps was inducted into the New England Soccer Hall of Fame.

=== International ===
As of February 2009, Heaps had played more MLS matches (289) than any other American player who had not received a cap for the United States. On June 25, 2009, Heaps received his first call-up for the United States for the 2009 CONCACAF Gold Cup. On July 11, 2009, Heaps made his debut with the United States against Haiti.

=== Post-playing career ===
After announcing his retirement from professional soccer, Heaps joined Morgan Stanley Private Wealth Management, providing customized investment advice and portfolio management for ultra high-net-worth individuals.

In 2010, Heaps became the color commentator for the New England Revolution games on Comcast SportsNet New England, alongside Brad Feldman.

In 2018, Heaps was announced as the first president and general manager of the expansion USL club Birmingham Legion FC in Birmingham, AL.

== Coaching career ==
On November 14, 2011, Heaps was named as head coach of the New England Revolution, replacing former Revolution coach Steve Nicol whose contract was not renewed following the 2011 Major League Soccer season. Heaps recorded his first win as head coach on March 24, 2012, 1-0 over the Portland Timbers. That match also featured the first goal scored under Heaps' coaching tenure, scored by Saër Sène. In the 2012, 2013, and 2014 seasons, the results of this change appeared positive. After a year of rebuilding in 2012, Heaps led the Revolution back to the playoffs in 2013 - the team's first appearance in the MLS postseason since 2009. In 2014, the Revolution made it to the MLS Cup, narrowly losing to the LA Galaxy. However, in 2015, the team was eliminated from playoff contention in the knockout round, and in 2016, they failed to qualify entirely, but did make a run to the 2016 U.S. Open Cup final, ultimately losing 4-2 to F.C. Dallas in the final. In mid 2017, the team sat 10th out of 11 in the Eastern Conference, with SportsClubStats.com offering a 7% chance of the team making the playoffs. This led to speculation that Heaps is or should be facing removal as head coach. On September 18, it was reported that Heaps had been fired by the Revolution and that his spot would be filled in by assistant coach Tom Soehn.

== Managerial statistics ==
As of match played September 16, 2017

Managerial record by team and tenure
Team	Nat	From	To	Record							
Team	Nat	From	To	G	W	D	L	GF	GA	GD	Win %
New England Revolution	(United States)	November 19, 2011	September 19, 2017	221	88	44	89	325	319	+6	39.82
Total				221	88	44	89	325	319	+6	39.82

== Honors ==
=== New England Revolution ===
- Lamar Hunt U.S. Open Cup: 2007
- North American SuperLiga: 2008

=== Individual ===
- MLS Rookie of the Year: 1999
- MLS All-Star: 2000
- New England Soccer Hall of Fame Inductee: 2011
- Duke Athletics Hall of Fame Inductee: 2013
