= Fernando Cárdenas (Colombian footballer) =

Colombian footballer (born 1988)

Personal information
- Full name: Fernando Antonio Cárdenas Arredondo
- Date of birth: 30 April 1988 (age 38)
- Place of birth: Cartago, Valle del Cauca, Colombia
- Height: 1.68 m (5 ft 6 in)
- Positions: Forward; midfielder

Team information
- Current team: Santa Fe
- Number: 30

Youth career
- Deportivo Pereira

Senior career*
Years	Team	Apps	(Gls)
2008–2011	Deportivo Pereira	39	(5)
2010	→ Once Caldas (loan)	16	(0)
2010	→ Deportes Tolima (loan)	20	(2)
2011	América de Cali	12	(1)
2012	New England Revolution	27	(2)
2013–	Santa Fe	2	(0)
- * Club domestic league appearances and goals as of 24 April 2013

Fernando Antonio Cárdenas Arredondo (born 30 April 1988) is a Colombian footballer who currently plays for Independiente Santa Fe.

== Career ==
Cárdenas began his youth career with Deportivo Pereira and made his first team debut with the club in 2008. After two seasons with Deportivo, he was sent on loan to Once Caldas and played for the club in the 2010 Copa Libertadores. After his stay with Once Caldas he was sent on loan to Deportes Tolima for the second half of the 2010 season. In 2011, he returned to Deportivo Pereira where his form in the first half of the campaign led to interest from top Colombian side América de Cali. The diminutive left-footed attacker than signed with América for the 2011 Finalización.

On 9 January 2012, it was announced that Cárdenas and former América teammate John Jairo Lozano would be joining New England Revolution in Major League Soccer. Cárdenas made his Revolution debut in the 2012 New England Revolution season opener; a 1–0 loss to the San Jose Earthquakes on March 12. He scored his first Revolution goal on May 2 in a 2–1 victory over the Colorado Rapids. His contract offer was declined on November 30.

== Teams ==
Club	Country	Year
Deportivo Pereira	Colombia	2008–2009
Once Caldas	Colombia	2010
Deportes Tolima	Colombia	2010
Deportivo Pereira	Colombia	2011
América de Cali	Colombia	2011
New England Revolution	United States	2012
Independiente Santa Fe	Colombia	2013
