= Michael Roach (soccer) =

American soccer player

Personal information
- Date of birth: 18 November 1988 (age 37)
- Place of birth: St. Louis, Missouri, United States
- Height: 6 ft 0 in (1.83 m)
- Position: Forward

College career
Years	Team	Apps	(Gls)
2007–2008	Indiana Hoosiers		
2009–2011	Saint Louis Billikens	34	(14)

Senior career*
Years	Team	Apps	(Gls)
2012	New England Revolution	0	(0)
2013–2014	St. Louis Ambush (indoor)	19	(9)
2015	Saint Louis FC	8	(0)
- * Club domestic league appearances and goals as of October 27, 2015

Michael Roach (born November 18, 1988) is an American soccer player.

== College career ==
Roach was born in St. Louis, Missouri, and spent his first two college years at Indiana University playing for the Hoosiers in 18 of their 22 games, scoring 1 goal and logging an assist, playing alongside future New England teammates Kevin Alston and Alec Purdie. He was redshirted his sophomore year before transferring to Saint Louis University in 2009. He scored 14 goals and 7 assists in 68 starts for the Billikens, being named to the Atlantic 10 second-team All-Conference and being recognized as the Most Outstanding Player of the Atlantic 10 Conference Championship as a sophomore in 2009.

Roach broke his leg playing in a club league the summer of 2010, and later had a run-in with a sprinkler head beyond the touchline during a training match for Saint Louis, which injured his knee. Roach spent most of the Billikens' 2010 campaign on the sideline with these injuries, playing only six games for Saint Louis. Roach again suffered an injury in his senior season, missing six games. Despite this setback, he led all Billikens players with four assists.

Despite setbacks in his final two collegiate years, he became known as a leader for Saint Louis. Citing his experience and ability to work with younger players, Billikens coach Mike McGinty said of Roach "He has intangible leadership and personality qualities that this team needs...he can, at some level, be a coach on field".

== Professional career ==
=== New England Revolution ===
The New England Revolution drafted Roach 60th overall in the 2012 MLS Supplemental Draft. Following a pre-season where Roach played in four games, scoring once, he was signed to the club's first team on March 6, 2012. New England's depth at midfield prevented him from seeing much playing time in the League schedule, only serving as an unused substitute in one game. He made his first team debut on May 29 of that year, playing all 90 minutes of New England's U.S. Open Cup game against the Harrisburg City Islanders. He was waived at the end of the season.

=== St. Louis Ambush ===
Roach signed with Major Indoor Soccer League expansion team St. Louis Ambush for the 2013–14 season.

=== Saint Louis FC ===
On March 13, 2015, it was announced that Roach had signed with USL expansion club Saint Louis FC.
