= Björn Runström =

Swedish footballer

Personal information
- Full name: Björn Sandro Runström
- Date of birth: 1 March 1984 (age 42)
- Place of birth: Stockholm, Sweden
- Height: 1.86 m (6 ft 1 in)
- Position: Striker

Youth career
- 1990–1996: Enskede IK
- 1996–2000: Hammarby IF

Senior career*
Years	Team	Apps	(Gls)
2001–2002	Bologna	0	(0)
2002–2003	Chievo	1	(0)
2003–2004	Fiorentina	2	(0)
2004–2006	Hammarby IF	57	(18)
2006–2008	Fulham	1	(0)
2007	→ Luton Town (loan)	8	(2)
2007–2008	→ 1. FC Kaiserslautern (loan)	28	(4)
2008–2011	OB	30	(7)
2010	→ Molde (loan)	17	(1)
2011–2012	Hammarby IF	24	(3)
2012	New England Revolution	3	(0)
Total		171	(35)

International career^{‡}
2001	Sweden U17	6	(3)
2003	Sweden U19	3	(0)
2004–2006	Sweden U21	20	(5)
- * Club domestic league appearances and goals as of 27 June 2012 ‡ National team caps and goals as of 18 June 2008

Björn Sandro Runström (born 1 March 1984) is a Swedish former footballer who played as a striker.

== Career ==
=== Early life ===
Runström grew up in the southern suburbs of Stockholm and went to Enskede school as a child.

He started playing football for Enskede IK at the age of six years, Runström's time in Enskede went well and at the age of 12 years he was rewarded with a move to a bigger club; Hammarby IF. Runström developed at a fast speed and when he was 16 he left Hammarby for Italy and Bologna. He stayed in Italy for three years and led Bologna to their first Italian Youth Championship in 19 years in 2001.

=== Italy ===
At 17 he was part of Bologna's first team but only made the bench in Serie A and Coppa Italia. In 2002, he was transferred to Chievo Verona and after that to Florentia Viola. His stay in Florence was not what he had dreamed of and when rumours spread in late 2003 that Fiorentina wanted to trade him for the Swedish international Kim Källström of Djurgårdens IF (one of former club Hammarby's biggest rivals) he was outraged and declared that it was a transfer he would never accept. "Me playing for Djurgården would be like Di Canio going back to Italy to play for A. S. Roma, it won't happen, if I go back to Sweden the only club that I could think of is my old club Hammarby".

=== Return to Hammarby IF ===
Runström did return to Hammarby soon after and played three more seasons scoring 18 goals in 57 matches. This record attracted the attention of Premier League club Fulham (he had the chance to join the Cottagers in the January transfer window but declined saying "I didn't want to go on a free transfer in January even though I had an offer from Fulham already then, Hammarby have meant much to me and I wanted them to be well paid").

=== Fulham ===
In July 2006, Runström joined Fulham on a three-year contract, for a fee of £700,000.

==== Loans ====
After making just one Premier League appearance against Tottenham Hotspur, on 30 January 2007, Runström moved to Luton Town on loan for a month. He returned to Fulham on 1 April 2007, having scored twice for Luton, against Sheffield Wednesday and Norwich City. Later that year, in July, he was loaned out to German club 1. FC Kaiserslautern, for the 2007–08 season. On his return, in May 2008, Runström was released by Fulham.

=== OB ===
On 4 June 2008, Runström signed a three-and-a-half-year contract with Danish club OB.

==== Loan to Molde ====
On 23 February 2010, Molde FK signed the Swedish forward on loan from Danish club Odense BK until the end of the season. He made his competitive debut on the opening day of the Norwegian Premier League on 14 March against the defending champions Rosenborg. He scored on his debut, a 35-yard cracker in a 2–1 loss. After this match Runström spent the rest of the season mainly on the bench, only making brief appearances not succeeding in making a mark on the matches. Runström was towards the end of the season considered redundant in Molde and the club terminated the contract with the player and sent him back to Denmark.

==== Departure ====
Runström and OB parted company in February 2011.

=== Second return to Hammarby IF ===
On 27 February, Runström signed for The superettan side Hammarby, On 3 July, Runström scored twice against Öster.

=== MLS and retirement ===
In February 2012, Runström joined the New England Revolution of Major League Soccer on trial for their preseason participation in the 2012 Desert Diamond Cup, in which he recorded a game-winning goal against Real Salt Lake on February 29 to send them through to the final.

On 28 March 2012, Runström signed with the Revolution on a free transfer. While trailing with the club, he had previously rejected two Revolution contract offers, before ultimately signing. He made his Revolution regular season debut on 14 April 2012 as a 79th minute substitute for Pepe Moreno in a 2-1 home loss to D.C. United. He made two more substitute appearances before New England declined his contract option on 27 June 2012 and Runström became a free agent. He announced his retirement from professional football in early 2013.
