= Dimitry Imbongo =

Congolese footballer (born 1990)

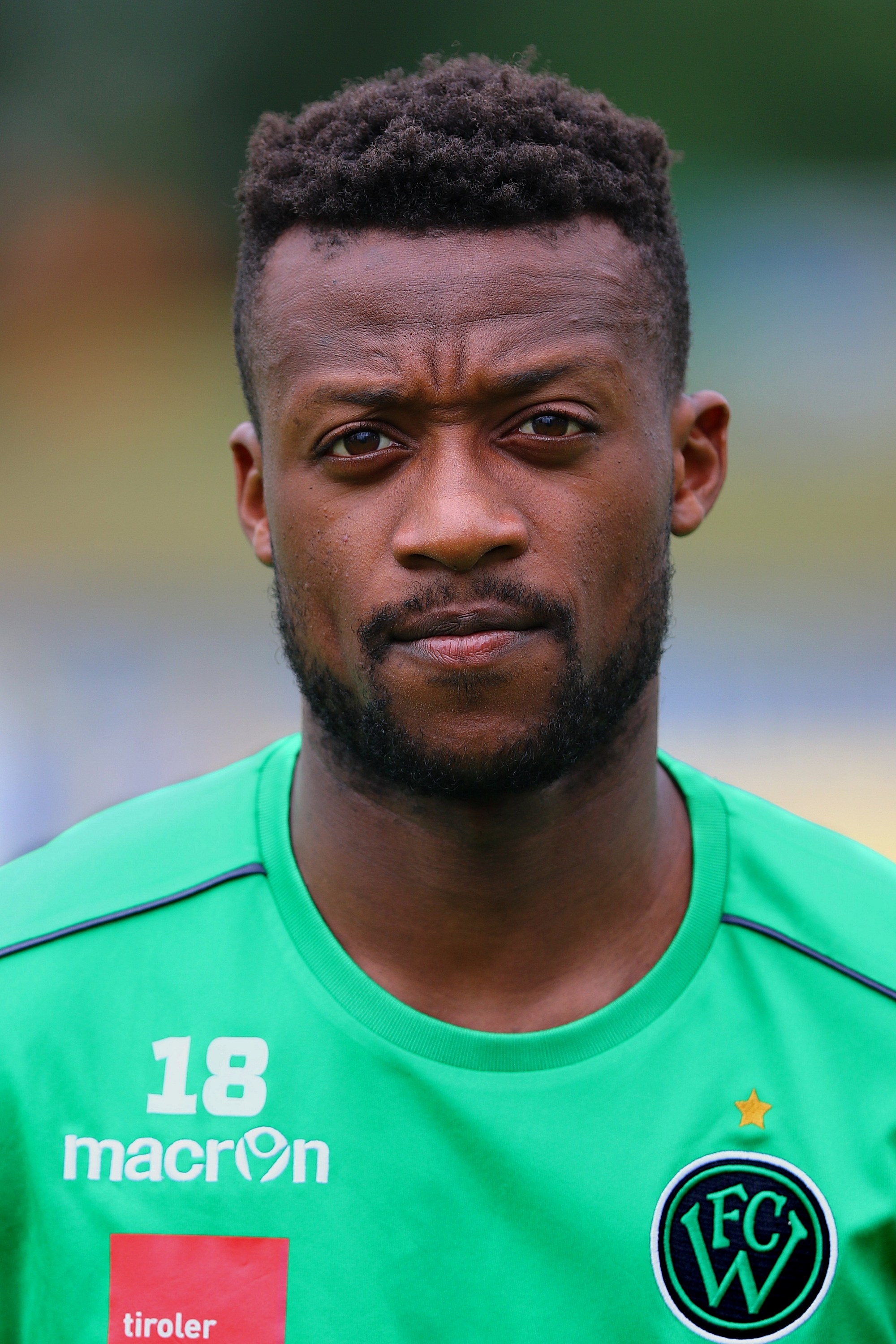
- Imbongo in 2018

Personal information
- Full name: Dimitry Imbongo Boele
- Date of birth: 28 March 1990 (age 36)
- Place of birth: Kinshasa, Zaire
- Height: 1.84 m (6 ft 0 in)
- Position: Forward

Team information
- Current team: Alemannia Aachen
- Number: 28

Youth career
- ES Nanterre

Senior career*
Years	Team	Apps	(Gls)
2009–2012	1860 Munich II	44	(12)
2011–2012	→ Darmstadt 98 (loan)	13	(0)
2012–2014	New England Revolution	34	(5)
2015	Kapfenberger SV	26	(5)
2016–2017	LASK	46	(6)
2017–2018	Wacker Innsbruck	20	(1)
2018–2019	Alemannia Aachen	27	(11)
2019	Sonnenhof Großaspach	18	(3)
2020–2021	FC Lahti	18	(6)
2021	Barakaldo	9	(1)
2021–2022	Fortuna Köln	21	(3)
2022–	Alemannia Aachen	15	(2)
- * Club domestic league appearances and goals as of 11 November 2022

Dimitry Imbongo Boele (born 28 March 1990) is a Congolese professional footballer who plays as a forward for German club Alemannia Aachen.

== Career ==
=== New England Revolution ===
On 16 July 2012, midway through the MLS Season, Imbongo signed a contract with the New England Revolution of Major League Soccer. His move to New England from TSV 1860 Munich II was reminicint of the move the Revolution's all-time leading goal scorer Taylor Twellman made in 2002. Imbongo made his Revolution debut as a 69th minute substitute for Kelyn Rowe in a 2–1 loss to the Philadelphia Union on 29 July 2012. He made his first start the following week in a 1–0 loss to Sporting Kansas City on 4 August. Imbongo scored his first goal for the Revolution on 5 September 2012, a game-winning effort against the Columbus Crew. That goal would be his only contribution in 9 appearances during the Revolution's 2012 campaign.

Despite helping the Revolution return to the playoffs for the first time in four years in 2013, Imbongo is perhaps most notable for setting a Revolution club-record by earning 3 red cards in a single season, the most in a season by any Revolution player.

As of 2024 Imbongo is tied for third in Revolution history for career red cards received, and earned the dubious distinction in just 32 matches, the fastest Rev to reach the three-ejection mark.

Revolution manager Jay Heaps praised Imbongo, stating he "does some good stuff. He holds it up, he has really good feet for a big man. He’s still adjusting to his teammates and that takes a little time."

In the 2013 New England Revolution season, his first and only full season in New England, Imbongo scored three goals and recorded four assists in 21 games played. He made his first start of the campaign on 11 May, and was issued a red card in a 18 May match in Houston after an incident with Dynamo defender Bobby Boswell.

He missed the following match against Toronto FC on 25 May serving a one-game suspension. On 13 July 2013, he was issued his second red card of season, again against Houston, and missed the following match against Colorado on 17 July due to suspension.

Imbongo scored the game-winner for the Revolution in the 4th round of the 2013 U.S. Open Cup, helping the Revolution defeat the New York Red Bulls 4–2 to the quarter finals.

On 27 July 2013 Imbongo scored at D.C. United, marking his third goal in seven games, but was then issued a club-record third red card of the season at Kansas City on 10 August, missing the next match against Chicago on 17 August. On 25 August 2013, Imbongo recorded his first two career MLS assists against Philadelphia Union, setting up a Kelyn Rowe's goal, (that was ultimately nominated for goal of the week), and then Juan Agudelo's second goal. Imbongo started both of the team's matches in the MLS Cup Playoffs against Sporting Kansas City, and scored first career playoff goal in the team's 3–1 loss in leg 2 on 6 November 2013.

Imbongo received what would be the final red card of his Revolution career in the final of the 2014 Desert Diamond Cup pre-season tournament, after getting in a "tussle" with Colorado's Marvin Chavez in the 85th minute.

Following the Revolution's acquisition of Charlie Davies, Imbongo would appear only twice for the Revolution in the 2014 New England Revolution season.

=== Colorado Rapids ===
On 8 December 2014 the Revolution traded Imbongo, Geoffrey Castillion and a second-round pick in the 2015 MLS SuperDraft to the Colorado Rapids for goalkeeper Joe Nasco and a third-round pick in the 2015 MLS SuperDraft.

Colorado declined Imbongo's option prior to the start of the 2015 season.

=== Later career ===
In February 2015 Imbongo signed for Austrian second-division side Kapfenberger SV.
