= Saër Sène =

French footballer (born 1986)

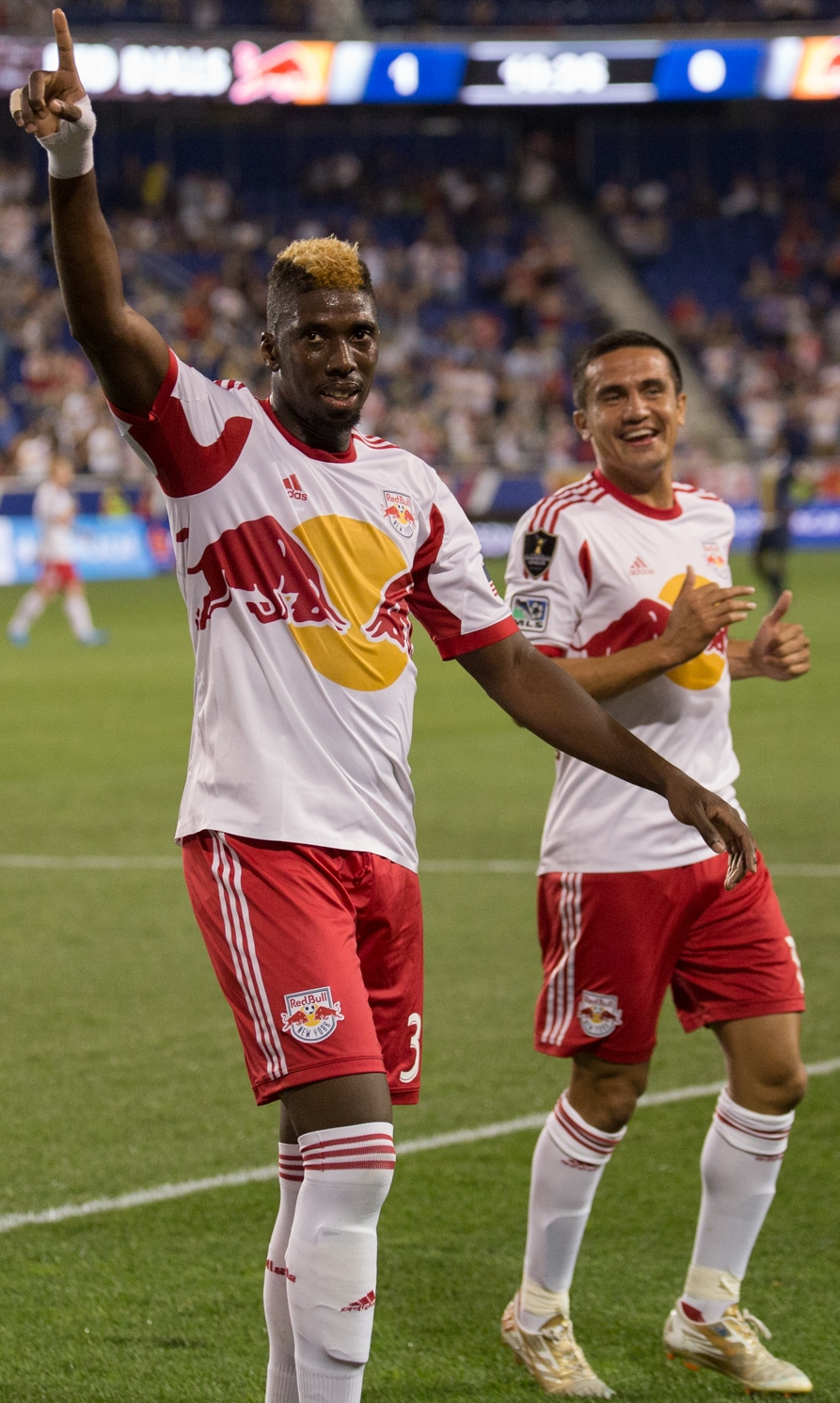
- Sène (left) with Tim Cahill in 2014

Personal information
- Date of birth: 4 November 1986 (age 40)
- Place of birth: Paris, France
- Height: 1.90 m (6 ft 3 in)
- Position: Forward

Youth career
- –2005: Paris Saint-Germain

Senior career*
Years	Team	Apps	(Gls)
2005–2007	FC Etampes	68	(39)
2007	SG Schorndorf	4	(2)
2007–2009	SG Sonnenhof Großaspach	52	(26)
2009–2012	Bayern Munich II	55	(19)
2012–2014	New England Revolution	59	(17)
2014	New York Red Bulls	5	(0)
2015	Blackpool	1	(0)
2015	SV Wehen Wiesbaden	8	(1)
2016	Stuttgarter Kickers	16	(2)
2017	Montana	7	(3)
2017	FAR Rabat	0	(0)
2017–2018	Chabab Atlas Khénifra	22	(7)
2018	Rapide Oued Zem	4	(0)
2018–2019	Youssoufia Berrechid	0	(0)
- * Club domestic league appearances and goals as of 21:02, 24 March 2020 (UTC)

Saër Sène (born 4 November 1986) is a French professional footballer who plays as a forward.

== Club career ==
Born in Paris, Sène began his career in the youth system of Paris Saint-Germain, before being released in 2005. He dropped into lower division football, signing for FC Étampes, before moving on to Germany in 2007, joining SG Schorndorf for a brief spell. He then spent two seasons with SG Sonnenhof Großaspach, the last of which was successful, with the club winning a league and cup double. His league debut came on 31 August 2007 in a 1–0 victory at home against SSV Ulm 1846. He scored his first goal in the 89th minute in a 4–2 defeat at TSV Crailsheim. He concluded his first season with 21 appearances and four goals, in the following season, Sène notched 31 assists and 22 goals, including three hat-tricks.

In 2009, Sène joined Bayern Munich, as part of the reserve team squad. He represented the first-team in a few pre-season friendlies, scoring against A.C. Milan in the Audi Cup. He was a regular for Bayern II in the 3. Liga, and was named in the first-team's squad for the 2009–10 UEFA Champions League. He missed most of the 2010–11 season through injury, but returned for the following season, scoring eight goals in the first half of the season, only to leave Bayern on a free transfer in January 2012.

=== Major League Soccer ===
A month later, on 13 February 2012, Sene signed on loan for New England Revolution of MLS. On 17 March 2012, Sène made his MLS debut starting the match before coming off on in the 56th minute for Diego Fagundez in a 3–0 loss against Sporting Kansas City in the club's second match of the season. The next game on 24 March 2012, Sène scored his first goal for the club in a 1–0 win over Portland Timbers On 19 May 2012, Sène scored his first brace in his MLS career in a 2–2 draw against Houston Dynamo. Sene's goal against the Philadelphia Union in week 9 won MLS Goal of the Week honors, the only Revolution strike to earn the honor that season. On 29 August 2012, Sène tore the anterior cruciate ligament in his left knee in a 3–3 draw against Chivas USA. Prior to his injury he had scored two goals. He was ruled out for the remainder of the 2012 New England Revolution season having scored 11 goals and notched 3 assists, the most for a Revolution player since Taylor Twellman in 2007.

On 12 August 2014, Sène was traded with an international roster spot to New York Red Bulls in exchange for Andre Akpan and allocation money. Two weeks later he scored his first goal for New York in a 2–0 victory over C.D. FAS in the 2014–15 CONCACAF Champions League.

=== Later career ===
On 2 December 2014, New York announced that the club would not exercise its 2015 option for Sène. He joined Blackpool on 9 January 2015 in a short-term deal until the end of the season.

On 15 March 2017, Sène signed with Bulgarian club Montana until the end of the season. He left the club in June when his contract expired.

== Personal life ==
Sène is the son of Oumar Sène, a former Senegal international footballer. While with New England, in July 2012, Sene was arrested for a "motor vehicle incident."

== Honours ==
SG Sonnenhof Großaspach

- Oberliga Baden-Württemberg (V): 2009
- Württemberg Cup: 2009
