= Jeremiah White =

American soccer player (born 1982)

Personal information
- Full name: Jeremiah White
- Date of birth: April 3, 1982 (age 44)
- Place of birth: Washington, D.C., United States
- Height: 5 ft 9 in (1.75 m)
- Position: Winger

Youth career
- FC Delco
- 2000–2003: Wake Forest Demon Deacons

Senior career*
Years	Team	Apps	(Gls)
2003	South Jersey Barons	9	(6)
2004	OFK Beograd	0	(0)
2004–2005	Panserraikos	8	(0)
2005–2007	FC Gueugnon	25	(7)
2007–2009	AGF	86	(7)
2010	Ettifaq	12	(0)
2010–2011	GKS Bełchatów	3	(0)
2012	New England Revolution	2	(0)
Total		145	(20)

International career
2008	United States	1	(0)
- * Club domestic league appearances and goals

Jeremiah White (born April 3, 1982) is an American former soccer player. He was known for his speed and normally played in midfield, though he was also used as a striker or fullback.

== Youth career ==
White attended The Haverford School for high school, and was a member of the soccer team, earning All-American honors. He also played on the Region I ODP and adidas ESP teams. White played with the youth club FC Delco while in school, and was named the club's player of the year while still a senior in high school.

White chose to play collegiate soccer for Wake Forest University, over other top universities such as Duke, Clemson, Maryland, and South Carolina. White played as a forward during his freshman season with the Demon Deacons, scoring his first collegiate goal against UNC-Charlotte, a goal that won that particular match in overtime.

White's sophomore season was a success, as he led the ACC in scoring, becoming the first Wake Forest player to do so since 1983. He recorded his first career hat-trick against the University of Richmond during this season.

Injury plagued White's junior season at Wake Forest, keeping him out of the starting eleven until October 29. Despite the injuries, White still led the team in scoring, and was named to the All-ACC team for the second year in a row.

In 2003, White's senior year, he was named ACC Player of the Year, and was named to the All-ACC team for the third straight year.

== Professional career ==
=== OFK Beograd ===
Following graduation from Wake Forest, White went to Europe, in an effort to prove that he could succeed there. He signed with Serbian club OFK Beograd, in January 2004, shunning offers from Major League Soccer, where he had been drafted in the third round of the MLS SuperDraft by the New England Revolution. White's short time with OFK Beograd was marred by a racism incident that occurred in March 2004, and received international media attention. White and a group of friends, including two black Brazilians, were confronted by a group of angry youth, one of whom, according to White, was "throwing around Nazi signs." Fierce words were exchanged, punches were thrown, and the groups eventually separated with no serious damage incurred. News organizations like BBC, RAI, and CNN picked up on the story, and White was headline news around the world for a short time. A month later, White asked for, and was granted, release from his contract on April 6, 2004, which led to speculation that White was leaving the team as a result of the incident. White dismissed this, saying, "That's the farthest thing from the truth."

=== Panserraikos ===
After his release from OFK Beograd, White set up a series of trials with clubs throughout Europe, including Dutch club Feyenoord, and Belgian club K.V.C. Westerlo. White was close to having a deal completed with Westerlo, but he instead signed with Greek Second Division side Panserraikos on a one-year contract.

White made his debut for the club on September 19, 2004, against AEL. He had a shot stopped by the AEL keeper in the 82nd minute, but the ensuing corner kick led to the match's only goal, scored by Kelvin Sebwe, giving Panserraikos a 1–0 win. While with Panserraikos, White was frequently played out of position as a target forward, as opposed to his preferred withdrawn striker position. Playing as a target forward is extremely unusual for a player who is only 5 feet, 8 inches tall. In addition, White claimed that the club physically altered his contract after he signed, attempting to claim that he signed for two years instead of one. White was also forced to play through injury, and eventually suffered a severe concussion that kept him out of action for two months. Following his recovery, White asked for, and after a dispute, was granted his release from the club in January 2005.

=== FC Gueugnon ===
For the second time in six months, White found himself without a team, and again set up trials across Europe, spending time with FC Nordsjælland of the Danish Superliga and FC Gueugnon of French Ligue 2. White signed with the French club on June 6, 2005, agreeing to a two-year contract.

White spent most of his early time with Gueugnon's reserve team, but eventually got his first goal of his Ligue 2 career on November 25, 2005, scoring the game-winning goal on a free kick from 28 yards out to beat Le Havre AC. Ten games into the season, White led the team in scoring with four goals, yet still failed to see consistent playing time.

=== AGF Aarhus ===
White turned his eyes towards Scandinavia, landing trials with Lyn Oslo of the Norwegian Tippeligaen and with AGF Aarhus of the Danish First Division. White agreed to a three-and-a-half-year contract with the Danish club on January 28, 2007. The club was relegated from the Danish Superliga in 2006, but after signing players like Olof Persson and Kári Árnason, they were widely expected to make a return to the top flight for the 2007–08 season. White made his debut for AGF on April 1, 2007, starting as a midfielder against Fremad Amager. AGF won the match 4–1, with White scoring his first goal for the club in the 15th minute. AGF secured promotion to the Danish Superliga by beating Kolding 2–0 on June 17, 2007, with White playing the full 90 minutes. During a friendly against FC Midtjylland over the 2007–08 winter break, White was involved in an accidental collision, which resulted in three facial fractures that required surgery. He made a speedy recovery and was back on the field in record time. The start of the 2008–09 season was marked with highs and lows under Ove Pedersen's management. During the holiday break, AGF decided to move in a new direction with the hiring of Erik Rasmussen as chief trainer. The team has since hovered between 5th & 7th places while getting their new system running smoothly. In December 2009, White and AGF mutually agreed to terminate his contract 6 months early.

=== Ettifaq FC ===
In January 2010, White signed with Saudi Arabian club Ettifaq FC, becoming the second American to play in a Middle Eastern country.

=== GKS Bełchatów ===
In the summer 2010, he moved to Polish club GKS Bełchatów on a one-year contract.

=== MLS ===
White was signed by the New England Revolution on March 9, 2012. He made his Revolution debut as a 61st minute substitute for Benny Feilhaber on March 17, 2012 in a 3-0 loss to Sporting Kansas City. He would make only one additional league appearance before being waived on June 27, 2012.

== National team ==
White made his international debut for the United States on January 19, 2008, in a friendly match against Sweden. The squad was largely composed of MLS players, with a few players from Scandinavian leagues. White came on as a substitute in the 2–0 win.
