= Florian Lechner =

German footballer

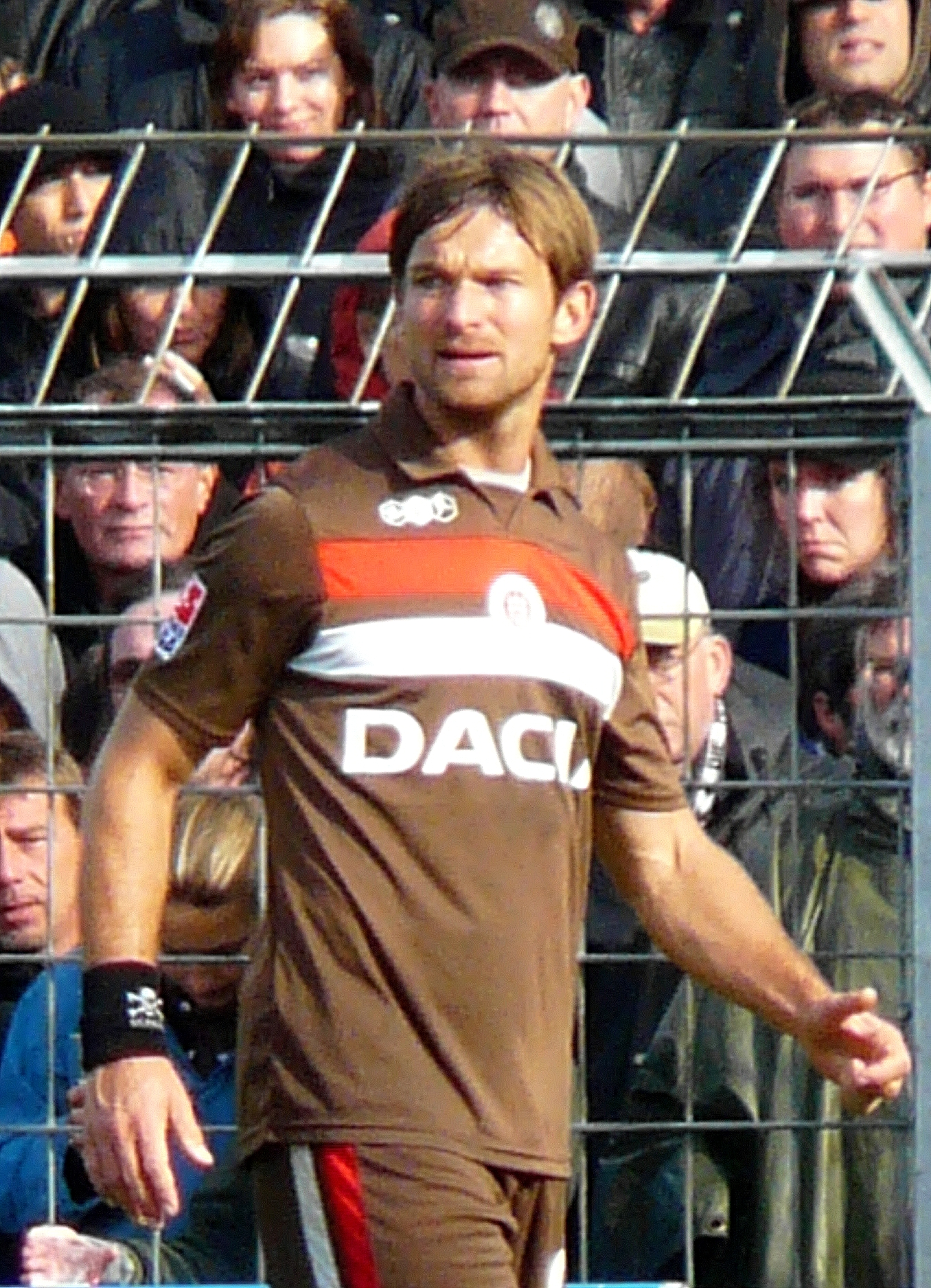
- Lechner with FC St. Pauli in 2009

Personal information
- Date of birth: 3 March 1981 (age 45)
- Place of birth: Ellwangen, West Germany
- Height: 1.78 m (5 ft 10 in)
- Position: Defender

Youth career
- SV Pfahlheim
- –1996: SVH Königsbronn
- 1996–2001: VfB Stuttgart

Senior career*
Years	Team	Apps	(Gls)
2001–2004	VfB Stuttgart II	66	(2)
2004–2011	FC St. Pauli	117	(2)
2011	Karlsruher SC	12	(0)
2012	New England Revolution	9	(0)
Total		200	(4)
- * Club domestic league appearances and goals

Florian "Flo" Lechner (born 3 March 1981) is a German former professional footballer who played as a defender.

== Career ==
=== Bundesliga career ===
Lechner was born in Ellwangen. He began his career in the youth ranks of VfB Stuttgart. In 2001, he debuted for VfB Stuttgart II and was a regular starter for the club's reserve side for three seasons.

In 2004, Lechner joined FC St. Pauli. Lechner made his professional debut in the 2. Bundesliga with St. Pauli on 8 February 2009 when he came on as a substitute in the 42nd minute against Greuther Fürth. On 11 May 2011, FC St. Pauli announced that Lechner's expiring contract would not be renewed. While with St. Pauli he appeared in 117 league games and scored two goals. In 2011, he joined Karlsruher SC and made 12 league appearances for the club.

=== New England Revolution ===
For the 2012 season, Lechner signed for New England Revolution in Major League Soccer. He made his debut for the Revolution on 31 March 2012 in a league match against the Los Angeles Galaxy coming on as a substitute in the 46th minute for Kevin Alston. The Revolution went on to win 3–1.

Lechner was released by New England on 19 November 2012.
