= Pepe Moreno (comics) =

Spanish comic artist (born 1954)

Saturnino "Pepe" Moreno Casares (born 1954) is a Spanish comic book artist, writer and video game developer who has been drawing professionally in Spain, other countries in Europe and in the US since the 1970s. He is best known in the United States for his 1990 digital graphic novel, Batman: Digital Justice, published by DC Comics.

Pepe Moreno also has a video game background. In 1993, he created the computer game, Hell Cab, for Time Warner's Interactive Media Group. Them, as president of Digital Fusion Inc (DFI), he created and designed Beach Head 2000, Beach Head 2002 and BeachHead Desert War, which were marketed by Infrogrames (Atari). DFI, in association with Trymedia and their digital rights management advanced copy protection technology, released BeachHead 2000 as was one of the first titles to be distributed via downloads protected with DRM.

His early underground work in the San Francisco Bay Area was featured at the Smithsonian Institution and in permanent exhibition at the Museum of Modern Art in France. Pepe's art is discussed in an article in the fall 1988 issue titled "Rebellion, Reform and Revolution: American Graphic Design for Social Change" MIT press). In 2015 Pepe collaborated with the late Richard Duardo "West Coast Warhol" to produce a series of fine art prints of his work.

== Hell Cab ==
Pepe led the development of Hell Cab, which was completed in 1993. Hell Cab was an interactive time travel adventure with a moral twist, published by the Time Warner Interactive Group (formerly Warner New Media) on CD-ROM.

Computer Gaming World in November 1993 criticised Hell Cab's "very slow" CD and QuickTime streaming speed, stating that the delays interrupted the player's immersion. The magazine described the software as "more like an interactive tour book and variety show lumped into one" than a game, and concluded with a hope that as technology improved "Moreno will be able to create a world of sight and sounds that truly entertain and offer smoother immersion into his creative vision". In April 1994 the magazine said that Hell Cab was "a case of new technology meeting old game design ... we were enamored of the graphics but less than enchanted with some of the game play".

== TV shows ==
Pepe worked along Bob Camp and contributed to character and scenario designs for shows like ThunderCats, Silverhawks and as lead designer for TigerSharks.

== The arts ==
Pepe's early underground artwork in the San Francisco Bay Area was featured at the Smithsonian Institution while the Museum of Modern Art in France has a permanent exhibition of Pepe's fine art. Pepe's art was heavily discussed in many articles and magazines, such as one issued in the fall of 1988 titled "Rebellion, Reform and Revolution: American Graphic Design for Social Change" (MIT Press). While in 2015 Pepe collaborated with the late & Great Richard Duardo, known as the "West Coast Warhol" as they produced a series of fine art prints of his work. In 2016, Pepe was awarded a large year-long art commission for the Valencia Opera House 2016–2017 season.

== Other games ==
The company has developed two additional games: Desert Gunner and Bridgehead (BeachHead 3000). In 2003, DFI released Tiger Hunt, a fast-paced, arcade-style, World War II tank combat game for the PC. The company also released RealPool for the PC, which was subsequently released as a Sony PlayStation title, and was followed with RealPool 2 in 2002.

== Other comics ==
Moreno has also had a career as a graphic artist, with work published in books and magazines such as Metal Hurlant and l'Echo des Savanes in Europe and Eerie, Vampirella, Heavy Metal Magazine and Epic Illustrated in the United States. Moreno also created the graphic novels Rebel, in the US, and the worldwide releases of Joe’s Air Force, Gene Kong, Generation Zero, and a collection of his early short stories compiled in the book Zeppelin. He combined his talents as a computer game developer and graphic artist with Batman: Digital Justice, a Batman graphic novel published in 1990 by DC Comics.

== Present day activities ==
In 2015, Pepe Moreno completed a large year-long commission for the Valencia Opera House. In 2016, Pepe was honored and recognized in China as the father and creator of Beach Head. In a joint press conference with Hero Entertainment, they officially declared that piracy of the Beach Head name in China has ended. In 2017, Pepe announced he had started working on the successor of BeachHead: BeachHead 2020 VR.
