= Alec Purdie =

American soccer player

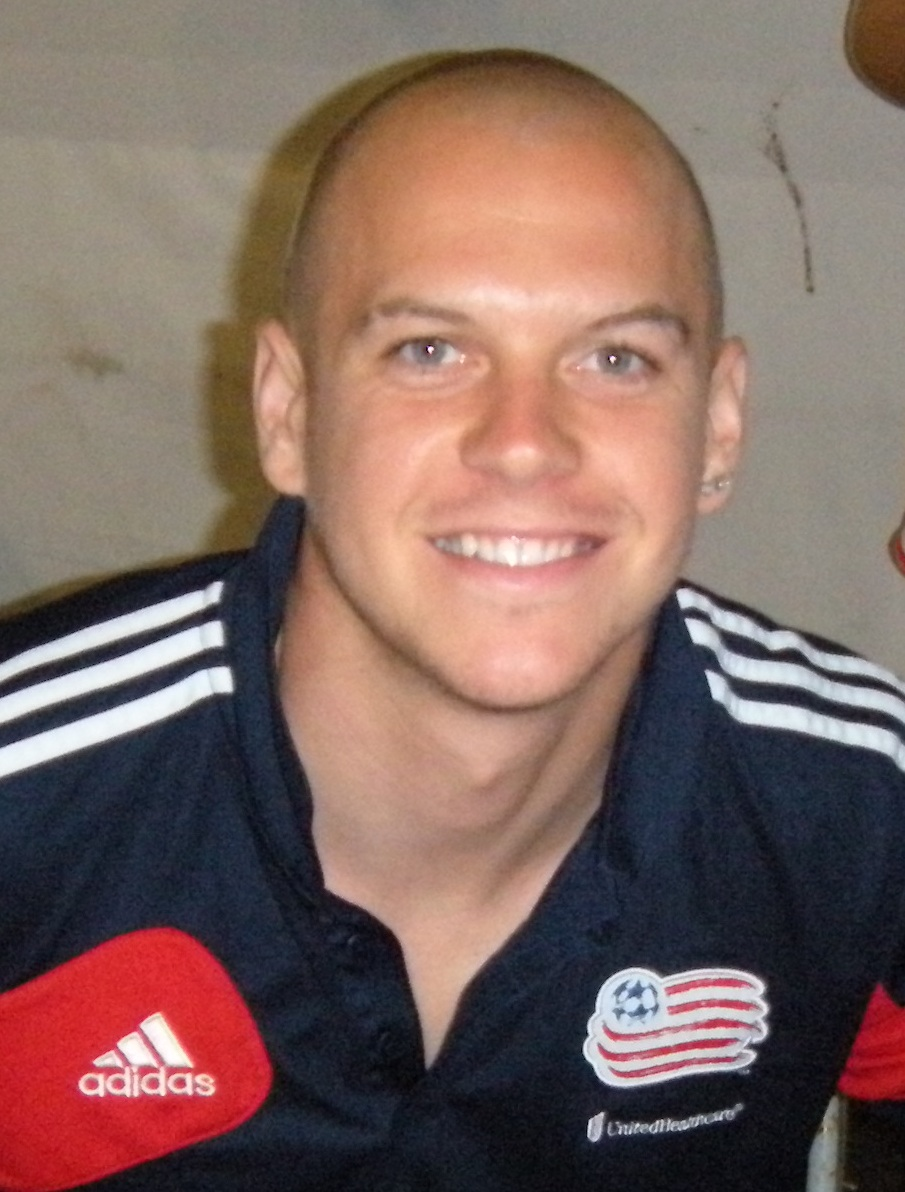

Personal information
- Full name: Alec Gregory Purdie
- Date of birth: November 24, 1988 (age 37)
- Place of birth: Elkhart, Indiana, United States
- Height: 5 ft 10 in (1.78 m)
- Position: Midfielder

Youth career
- 2007–2011: Indiana Hoosiers

Senior career*
Years	Team	Apps	(Gls)
2007–2009	Indiana Invaders	12	(0)
2012	New England Revolution	5	(0)
2013	FK Älmeboda/Linneryd	10	(3)

Managerial career
- 2017–2018: Belmont Bruins (assistant)
- 2019–2020: Wofford Terriers (assistant)
- 2021–2023: South Carolina Gamecocks (assistant)
- * Club domestic league appearances and goals as of June 29, 2013

Alec Purdie (born November 24, 1988) is an American soccer player who most recently played for New England Revolution in Major League Soccer.

== Career ==
=== College and amateur ===
Purdie played college soccer at the Indiana University between 2007 and 2011. During his time at Indiana, Purdie was named Captain of the team, earned first-team All-Big Ten honors as a senior, earned Offensive MVP honors and later Big Ten player of the week/National player of the week accolades for helping lead Indiana to the title at the Mike Berticelli Memorial Tournament. After the season had concluded, he was invited to the 2012 MLS Combine in Ft. Lauderdale, Florida.

Purdie spent time playing with USL Premier Development League club Indiana Invaders between 2007 and 2009.

=== Professional ===
New England Revolution selected Purdie in the second round (No. 22 overall) of the 2012 MLS Supplemental Draft.

Purdie made his debut as a 70th-minute substitute during a 1–0 win against Portland Timbers on March 24, 2012.

Before the 2013 season he signed a three-month contract with [Swedish Football Division 3] club FK Älmeboda/Linneryd to train and gain fitness after leaving New England Revolution. After his 3-month stint in Vaxjo, he spent time going on trials throughout Sweden. In January 2014, he had to decide whether to stay in Sweden or to take a job offer, and retired from playing.
