= John Lozano (footballer, born 1984) =

Colombian footballer

Personal information
- Full name: John Jairo Lozano Castaño
- Date of birth: 31 July 1984 (age 42)
- Place of birth: Guacarí, Colombia
- Height: 1.83 m (6 ft 0 in)
- Position: Defender

Team information
- Current team: Atlético Huila

Youth career
- Deportivo Pereira

Senior career*
Years	Team	Apps	(Gls)
2003–2010	Deportivo Pereira	68	(4)
2010–2011	América de Cali	43	(2)
2012	New England Revolution	2	(0)
2012–2013	Cúcuta Deportivo	40	(1)
2014–2015	Atlético Huila	28	(3)
2015–2016	Deportivo Cali	18	(2)
2016–	Atlético Huila	0	(0)
- * Club domestic league appearances and goals as of 22 June 2016

John Jairo Lozano Castaño (born 31 July 1984) is a Colombian football defender who currently plays for Atlético Huila.

== Career ==
Lozano began his youth career with Deportivo Pereira and made his first team debut with the club in 2003. He remained at the club for seven seasons making 68 appearances and scoring 4 goals. His play with Pereira led to interest from top Colombian side América de Cali who signed Lozano in the summer of 2010. Lozano began the 2011 pre-season with América before going on trial with top Argentine club Boca Juniors. After his trial stint with Boca, Lozano returned to América for the 2011 season. While with América Lozano was a starter for the club making 43 appearances and scoring two goals as a central defender.

On 9 January 2012 it was announced that Lozano would be joining New England Revolution in Major League Soccer.

Lozano was waived by New England on 27 June 2012.
