= Pepe Moreno (footballer) =

Colombian footballer (born 1981)

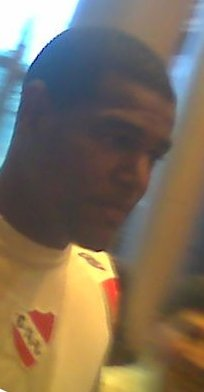

Personal information
- Full name: José Alcides Moreno Mora
- Date of birth: 10 September 1981 (age 45)
- Place of birth: Santander de Quilichao, Colombia
- Height: 1.84 m (6 ft 1/2 in)
- Position: Striker

Youth career
- Deportivo Pasto

Senior career*
| Years | Team | Apps | (Gls) |
| 1999–2000 | Deportivo Pasto | 10 | (1) |
| 2000–2004 | América de Cali | 43 | (2) |
| 2004–2005 | Millonarios | 29 | (12) |
| 2005–2006 | América de Cali | 42 | (18) |
| 2006 | → Dynamo Kyiv (loan) | 8 | (0) |
| 2007– | Independiente | 22 | (4) |
| 2008 | → Steaua București (loan) | 15 | (5) |
| 2008 | → América de Cali (loan) | 8 | (0) |
| 2009–2010 | → Juan Aurich (loan) | 10 | (1) |
| 2010 | → Steaua București (loan) | 6 | (0) |
| 2011 | → Atlético Huila (loan) | 11 | (3) |
| 2011–2012 | Once Caldas | 21 | (7) |
| 2012 | → New England Revolution (loan) | 7 | (1) |
| 2013–2014 | La Equidad | 50 | (14) |
| 2015 | Atlético Bucaramanga | 9 | (0) |
| 2015 | Jaguares de Córdoba | 11 | (4) |

International career^{‡}
| 2006 | Colombia | 3 | (0) |
- * Club domestic league appearances and goals as of 01:47, 11 September 2016 (UTC) ‡ National team caps and goals as of 20:45, 17 February 2010 (UTC)

José Alcides "Pepe" Moreno Mora (Note: In this Spanish name, the first or paternal surname is Moreno and the second or maternal family name is Mora.) (born 10 September 1981) is a retired Colombian footballer.

== Career ==
Pepe Moreno began his career in the youth system of Deportivo Pasto, club with which he made his professional debut in Colombia's first division during the 1999 season. After two years with Pasto he joined América de Cali. While with Cali he helped the club capture Colombian league titles in 2001 and 2002. During this time he appeared in 43 league games and scored 2 goals, used primarily as a reserve.

In 2004 Pepe Moreno joined Millonarios and began to make a name for himself as a goal scorer. While with Millonarios he scored 12 goals in 29 league matches. In 2005, he returns to América de Cali and continues his goal scoring exploits with 18 goals in 42 matches. In 2006, he leaves to Europe, signing with on loan with Dynamo Kyiv. After limited success he returned to South America in January 2007, as Argentina's Club Atlético IndependienteIndependiente moved to acquire him for $900,000 from América de Cali. During this stint with Independiente he scored 4 goals in 19 appearances. In January 2008, the Colombian striker Moreno joined Steaua București on loan from Independiente until the end of the season, with an option to buy for 1,400,000 euros. Moreno has success with Steaua but the club was unable to buy him. After loans to América de Cali in which he was a member of the Finalizacion 2008 championship squad and Juan Aurich, Pepe returned again on loan to Steaua in the winter of 2010 for a half-year. Steaua again had the option to buy him at the end of the season. On his return match with Steaua versus Romanian champions Unirea Urziceni, he assisted on the equalizing goal with a back pass to Pantelis Kapetanos in minute 92, helping Steaua draw away with Unirea, 2–2.

In January 2011 Moreno returned to Colombia, this time on loan to Atlético Huila. During his half season with Huila he scored 3 goals in 11 appearances. Moreno than signed with Once Caldas for the second half of the 2011 Colombian championship. With Once Caldas Pepe Moreno regained his goal scoring form recording 7 goals and 4 assists in 20 matches.

On 1 February 2012 it was announced that Moreno was acquired on loan by New England Revolution in Major League Soccer. Despite this announcement, on 7 February, Moreno reportedly publicly stated that he had chosen to remain with Once Caldas instead of reporting to the Revolution. On the 9th New England Revolution President Brian Bilello wrote in an article on the Revolution's website that all necessary paperwork had been filed to complete the loan deal, and that representatives from the team had been attempting to contact Moreno himself for the past few days, but were unable to do so. Shortly thereafter, WUNR's "Deportes y Mas" host Marino Velasquev reported that the Revolution and MLS had sued Moreno for breach on contract. Velasquez added on 13 February that the team was taking the case to FIFA. Moreno would report to the Revolution nearly 7 weeks later, citing visa issues and a "Personal Matter" keeping him from arriving. He scored his only goal for the franchise in a 2–1 defeat to DC United on 14 April. In August of that year, after making a total of 7 appearances, Moreno was waived by the club.

== International career ==
In 2006 Moreno played three games for the Colombia national team.
