= 2014 in American soccer =

Soccer in the United States
- Season: 2014

Men's soccer
- Supporters' Shield: Seattle Sounders FC
- NASL: San Antonio Scorpions
- USL Pro: Sacramento Republic
- NPSL: New York Red Bulls U-23
- PDL: Michigan Bucks
- US Open Cup: Seattle Sounders FC
- MLS Cup: LA Galaxy

Women's soccer
- NWSL: FC Kansas City

The 2014 season is the 102nd season of competitive soccer in the United States.

== National teams ==
=== Men ===
==== Senior ====
Wins	Losses	Draws
6	5	4

February 1 Friendly	United States	2–0	South Korea	Carson, United States
14:00 PST	Wondolowski 4', 60'	Report; Report		Stadium: StubHub Center; Attendance: 27,000; Referee: Hugo Cruz (Costa Rica)

March 5 Friendly	Ukraine	2–0	United States	Larnaca, Cyprus
14:00 EST	Yarmolenko 12'; Dević 60'; Fedetskyi (yellow card) 65'; Bezus (yellow card) 84'	Report; Report		Stadium: Antonis Papadopoulos Stadium; Attendance: 1,573; Referee: Leontios Trattos (Cyprus)
Note: Game moved from Metalist Stadium in Kharkiv due to the 2014 pro-Russian unrest in Ukraine.

April 2 Friendly	United States	2–2	Mexico	Glendale, United States
20:00 MT	Bradley 15'; Wondolowski 28'; Yedlin (yellow card) 83'	Report; Report	Márquez 49'; Pulido 67'; Ponce (yellow card) 76'	Stadium: University of Phoenix Stadium; Attendance: 59,066; Referee: Roberto Moreno (Panama)

May 27 Friendly	United States	2–0	Azerbaijan	San Francisco, United States
19:00 PT	Diskerud 75'; Jóhannsson 81'	Report; Report		Stadium: Candlestick Park; Attendance: 24,688; Referee: Henry Bejarano (Costa Rica)

June 1 Friendly	United States	2–1	Turkey	Harrison, United States
14:00 ET	Johnson 26'; Dempsey 52'	Report	İnan 90' (pen.)	Stadium: Red Bull Arena; Attendance: 26,762; Referee: Slim Jedidi (Tunisia)

June 7 Friendly	United States	2–1	Nigeria	Jacksonville, United States
17:30 ET	Altidore 31', 68'	Report	Moses 86' (pen.)	Stadium: EverBank Field; Attendance: 52,033; Referee: Mark Clattenburg (England)

June 16 FIFA World Cup	Ghana	1–2	United States	Natal, Brazil
19:00	Rabiu (yellow card) 30'; A. Ayew 82'; Muntari (yellow card) 90+2'	Report	Dempsey 1'; Brooks 86'	Stadium: Arena das Dunas; Attendance: 39,760; Referee: Jonas Eriksson (Sweden)

June 22 FIFA World Cup	United States	2–2	Portugal	Manaus, Brazil
19:00	Jones 64', (yellow card) 75'; Dempsey 81'	Report	Nani 5'; Varela 90+5'	Stadium: Arena da Amazônia; Attendance: 40,123; Referee: Néstor Pitana (Argentina)

June 26 FIFA World Cup	United States	0–1	Germany	Recife, Brazil
13:00	Gonzalez (yellow card) 37'; Beckerman (yellow card) 62'	Report	Höwedes (yellow card) 11'; Müller 55'	Stadium: Itaipava Arena Pernambuco; Attendance: 41,876; Referee: Ravshan Irmatov (Uzbekistan)

July 1 FIFA World Cup	Belgium	2–1	United States	Salvador, Brazil
17:00	Kompany (yellow card) 42'; De Bruyne 93'; Lukaku 105'	Report	Cameron (yellow card) 18'; Green 107'	Stadium: Arena Fonte Nova; Attendance: 51,227; Referee: Djamel Haimoudi (Algeria)

September 3 Friendly	Czech Republic	0–1	United States	Prague, Czech Republic
14:15 EST		Report	Bedoya 39'; Morales (yellow card) 90+1'	Stadium: Generali Arena; Attendance: 12,642; Referee: István Vad (Hungary)

October 10 Friendly	United States	1–1	Ecuador	East Hartford, United States
19:00 EST	Diskerud 5'; Orozco (yellow card) 32'; Corona (yellow card) 61'	Report	Erazo (yellow card) 54'; Valencia 88'	Stadium: Rentschler Field; Attendance: 36,265; Referee: Roberto Moreno (Panama)

October 14 Friendly	United States	1–1	Honduras	Boca Raton, United States
20:00 EDT	Altidore 10'; Besler (yellow card) 22'; Jones (yellow card) 60'; Diskerud (yellow card) 85'	Report	Claros (yellow card) 16'; Quioto (yellow card) 50'; Figueroa 86'; Garrido (yellow card) 89'	Stadium: FAU Stadium; Attendance: 14,805; Referee: Yadel Martinez (Cuba)

November 14 Friendly	United States	1–2	Colombia	London, England
14:45 ET	Altidore 10' (pen.), (yellow card) 35'	Report	Aguilar (yellow card) 29'; Bacca 60'; Gutiérrez 87'	Stadium: Craven Cottage; Attendance: 24,235; Referee: Szymon Marciniak (Poland)

November 18 Friendly	Republic of Ireland	4–1	United States	Dublin, Republic of Ireland
14:45 ET	Pilkington 7'; Brady 55', 86'; McClean 82'; McGeady (yellow card) 90'; Meyler (yellow card) 90+4'	Report	Beckerman (yellow card) 37'; Diskerud 39'; Altidore (yellow card) 65'; Cameron (yellow card) 85'; Johnson (yellow card) 90+2'	Stadium: Aviva Stadium; Attendance: 33,332; Referee: Paweł Raczkowski (Poland)

==== Goalscorers ====
Rank	Name	World Cup	Friendly	Total
1	Jozy Altidore	0	4	4
2	Clint Dempsey	2	1	3
2	Chris Wondolowski	0	3	3
2	Mix Diskerud	0	3	3
3	Jermaine Jones	1	0	1
3	John Brooks	1	0	1
3	Julian Green	1	0	1
3	Alejandro Bedoya	0	1	1
3	Michael Bradley	0	1	1
3	Fabian Johnson	0	1	1
3	Aron Jóhannsson	0	1	1
TOTALS		5	16	21

==== Under-23 ====
April 23 Exhibition	United States	2–1	(Mexico) Club Tijuana Reserves	Carson, United States
17:30 PDT	Joya 52', 90+2'	Report	Moreno 81'	Stadium: US Soccer National Training Center; Attendance: 200

August 6 Friendly	Bahamas	1–5	United States	Nassau, Bahamas
18:00 PDT	Patrick 55'	Report	Shams; Morris; Gil; Flores; Salgado	Stadium: Thompson A. Robinson National Stadium; Attendance: 3,000

October 13 Friendly	United States	0–3	Brazil	Brasília, Brazil
18:00		Report		Attendance: 10,000

==== Under-20 ====
May 21 Exhibition	Carolina RailHawks (United States)	2–1	United States U-20	Cary, North Carolina
	Aa. King; Osaki	Report	Harkes	Stadium: WakeMed Soccer Park

May 22 Exhibition	Carolina RailHawks U-23's (United States)	0–1	United States U-20	Cary, North Carolina
		Report	Baird 18'	Stadium: WakeMed Soccer Park

May 24 Exhibition	United States U-20	2–4	(United States) Wilmington Hammerheads FC	Raleigh, North Carolina
	Novakovich 45', 48' (pen.)	Report	Jane 18', 41', 73' (pen.); Aparicio 25'	Stadium: NC State Soccer Stadium

July 14 NTC Tournament	United States	2–1	Chile	Carson, United States
18:00 PDT	Donovan (yellow card) 30'; Novakovich 65'; Pfeffer 73' (yellow card) 75'	Report	Cuevas 22'; Pardo (yellow card) 68'	Stadium: StubHub Center; Attendance: 125; Referee: Nima Saghafi (United States)

July 16 NTC Tournament	United States	4–0	Bermuda	Carson, United States
16:00 PDT	Novakovich 27'; Pfeffer 39' (pen.); Thompson 45'; Webb 85' (o.g.)	Report	Simmons (yellow card) 42'	Stadium: StubHub Center; Attendance: 150; Referee: Victor Rivas (United States)

July 18 NTC Tournament	United States	0–0	Australia	Carson, United States
19:00 PDT	Canouse (yellow card) 86'	Report	Sotorio (yellow card) 76'	Stadium: StubHub Center; Attendance: 700; Referee: Victor Rivas (United States)

==== Under-18 ====
February 4 Copa del Atlantico	United States	0–1	Spain	Maspalomas, Spain
19:30 WET		Report	Pino Caride 88'	Stadium: Estadio Municipal

February 5 Copa del Atlantico	United States	0–1	Argentina	Las Palmas, Spain
17:00 WET		Report	Contreras 66'	Stadium: Estadio Alfonso Silva

February 7 Copa del Atlantico	Canary Islands	3–2	United States	Las Palmas, Spain
17:00 WET	Montes 44'; Morales 52'; Exposito 89'	Report	Swanson (yellow card) 35'; Winn 60'; Rubin 79'	Stadium: Estadio Alfonso Silva

December 17 Friendly	Germany	1–2	United States	Marbella, Spain
14:30 WET	Clasen (yellow card) 36'; Owsusu (pen.), 90+3'	Report	Pineda 19'; Lennon 76'; Klinsmann (yellow card) 79' (yellow-red card) 90+2'	Stadium: Estadio Municipal de Marbella; Attendance: 45; Referee: Raul Chavet Garcia

December 19 Friendly	Germany	v	United States	Marbella, Spain
TBD WET				Stadium: Estadio Municipal de Marbella

==== Under-17 ====
July 28 Nordic Championship	Denmark	2–0	United States	Kolding, Denmark
15:00 WET	Schultz 4'; Ramkilde 28'	Report		Stadium: Mosevej Stadium; Attendance: 871; Referee: Nermin Cisic (Sweden)

July 29 Nordic Championship	Norway	4–1	United States	Kolding, Denmark
15:00 WET	Sæter 8', 79'; Helmersen 19'; Stensby 60'	Report	Rice 45'	Stadium: Mosevej Stadium; Attendance: 152; Referee: Petri Viljanen (Finland)

July 31 Nordic Championship	United States	4–0	Faroe Islands	Kolding, Denmark
15:00 WET	Koreniuk 4'; Niclasen 14' (o.g.); Gaines 21'; Matzelevich 80'	Report		Stadium: Mosevej Stadium; Attendance: 137

August 2 Nordic Championship	United States	3–4	Finland	Nørre Aaby, Denmark
15:00 WET	Panchot 56'; Rice 60'; Braima 70'	Report	Sherrif Jr. 13'; Lahikainen 18'; Soisalo 31'; Källman 46'	Stadium: Nørre Aaby Stadion; Attendance: 74; Referee: Ívar Ovar Kristjánsson (Iceland)

August 2 Copa Mexico – GS	United States	6–0	China	Mexico City, Mexico
	Pulisic 20', 42', 57'; Wright 28', 58', 61'			Stadium: Estadio Azul Auxiliary Field

August 3 Copa Mexico – GS	Mexico	0–2	United States	Mexico City, Mexico
			Pulisic 2'; Gaines 24'	Stadium: Estadio Azul Auxiliary Field

August 4 Copa Mexico – GS	United States	2–1	Paraguay	Mexico City, Mexico
	Wright 23'; Pulisic 34'		Valiente 38'	Stadium: Estadio Azul Auxiliary Field

August 6 Copa Mexico – QF	United States	1–1 (3–0 p)	Colombia	Mexico City, Mexico
	Pulisic 16'		Balaños 34'	Stadium: Estadio Azul Auxiliary Field
	Penalties
	Pulisic (penalty scored); Rice (penalty scored); Barbir (penalty scored)

August 8 Copa Mexico – SF	United States	1–2	Ecuador	Mexico City, Mexico
	Zendejas 70'		Corozo 57'; Montezume 66' (pen.)	Stadium: Estadio Azul Auxiliary Field

=== Women ===
==== Senior ====
Wins	Losses	Draws
16	3	4

January 31 Friendly	United States	1–0	Canada	Frisco, United States
21:00 EST	Leroux 78'	Report		Stadium: Toyota Stadium; Attendance: 20,862; Referee: Mirian León (El Salvador)

February 8 Friendly	United States	7–0	Russia	Boca Raton, United States
15:30 EST	Lloyd 29', 37'; O'Reilly 32'; Press 51', 59'; Leroux 54'; Wambach 67'	Report		Stadium: FAU Stadium; Attendance: 8,857; Referee: Marie-Soleil Beaudoin (Canada)

February 13 Friendly	United States	8–0	Russia	Atlanta, United States
19:30 EST	Terekhova 11' (o.g.); Orlova 50' (o.g.); Rodriguez 52'; Wambach 54'; Rapinoe 65'; Holiday 81' (pen.); O'Reilly 83'; Press 86'	Report		Stadium: Georgia Dome; Attendance: 16,133; Referee: Melissa Paola (Honduras)

March 5 Algarve Cup	United States	1–1	Japan	Parchal, Portugal
7:45 EST	Leroux 59'	Report	Miyama 83'	Stadium: Stadium Bela Vista; Attendance: 500; Referee: Efthalia Mitsi (Greece)

March 7 Algarve Cup	United States	0–1	Sweden	Albufeira, Portugal
8:30 EST		Report	Schelin 24'	Stadium: Estádio Municipal; Attendance: 2,000; Referee: Yemi Martinez (Colombia)

March 10 Algarve Cup	United States	3–5	Denmark	Albufeira, Portugal
10:40 EST	Press 51'; Leroux 63'; Rapinoe 68'	Report	Veje 24'; Nadim 35'; Sørensen 39'; Rasmussen 62'; Nielsen 90+2'	Stadium: Estádio Municipal; Attendance: 750; Referee: Riem Hussein (Germany)

March 12 Algarve Cup	United States	3–0	North Korea	Parchal, Portugal
7:00 EST	Wambach 11', 58'; O'Reilly 88'	Report		Stadium: Belavista Municipal Stadium; Attendance: 250; Referee: Stephanie Frappart (France)

April 6 Friendly	United States	2–0	China	Commerce City, United States
17:00 EST	Holiday 39'; Rapinoe 78'	Report		Stadium: Dick's Sporting Goods Park; Attendance: 14,903; Referee: Christina Unkel (United States)

April 10 Friendly	United States	3–0	China	San Diego, United States
20:00 PT	Lloyd 20', 23'; Leroux 46'	Report		Stadium: Qualcomm Stadium; Attendance: 12,857; Referee: Ekaterina Koroleva (United States)

May 8 Friendly	Canada	1–1	United States	Winnipeg, Canada
21:00 EST	Buchanan 35'	Report	Leroux 78'	Stadium: Investors Group Field; Attendance: 28,255; Referee: Melissa Pastrana (Honduras)

June 14 Friendly	United States	1–0	France	Tampa, United States
19:00 EST	Leroux 21'	Report		Stadium: Raymond James Stadium; Attendance: 9,799; Referee: Christina Unkel (United States)

June 19 Friendly	United States	2–2	France	East Hartford, United States
19:00 EST	Morgan 56', 85'	Report	Necib 27' (pen.); Henry 68'	Stadium: Rentschler Field; Attendance: 14,695; Referee: Quetzalli Alvarado (Mexico)

August 20 Friendly	United States	4–1	Switzerland	Cary, United States
19:30 EST	Rapinoe 3'; Lloyd 56' (pen.), (yellow card) 85'; Press 77'; Wambach 87' (pen.)	Report	Kiwic (yellow card) 19'; Wälti (yellow card) 45+1'; Abbé (yellow card) 58'; Crnogorčević 71' (pen.)	Stadium: WakeMed Soccer Park; Attendance: 9,992; Referee: Ekaterina Koroleva (United States)

September 13 Friendly	United States	8–0	Mexico	Sandy, United States
16:30 MT	Garciamendez 12' (o.g.); Wambach 23', 41'; Morgan 36', 56'; Engen 58'; Leroux 71'; O'Reilly 75'	Report		Stadium: Rio Tinto Stadium; Attendance: 8,849; Referee: Vilma Montez (SLV)

September 18, 2014 Friendly	United States	4–0	Mexico	Rochester, New York
19:00 ET	Rodriguez 8'; Rapinoe 37'; Heath 43'; Morgan 79'	Report		Stadium: Sahlen's Stadium; Attendance: 5,680; Referee: Marie-Soleil Beauboin (CAN)

October 15, 2014 WCQ - Group Stage	United States	1–0	Trinidad and Tobago	Kansas City, Kansas
20:30 ET	Wambach 54'	Report; Report		Stadium: Sporting Park; Attendance: 3,621; Referee: Marianela Araya (CRC)

October 17, 2014 WCQ - Group Stage	United States	5–0	Guatemala	Bridgeview, Illinois
21:00 ET	Heath 7', 57'; Lloyd 46'; Engen 58'; Rapinoe 66'	Report; Report		Stadium: Toyota Park; Attendance: 8,796; Referee: Maurees Skeete (GUY)

October 20, 2014 WCQ - Group Stage	Haiti	0–6	United States	Washington, D.C.
19:30 ET		Report; Report	Lloyd 9'; Wambach 38', 61'; Klingenberg 57'; Press 65'; Brian 82'	Stadium: RFK Stadium; Attendance: 6,421; Referee: Quetzali Alvarado (MEX)

October 24, 2014 WCQ - Semi-Final	United States	3–0	Mexico	Chester, Pennsylvania
16:30 ET	Lloyd 6', 30' (pen.); Press 56'	Report; Report		Stadium: PPL Park; Attendance: 8,773; Referee: Sheena Dickson (CAN)

October 26, 2014 WCQ - Final	Costa Rica	0–6	United States	Chester, Pennsylvania
18:00 ET		Report; Report	Wambach 4', 35', 41', 71'; Lloyd 18'; Leroux 73'	Stadium: PPL Park; Attendance: 11,625; Referee: Lucila Venegas (MEX)

December 10, 2014 Group Stage	United States	1–1	China	Brasília, Brazil
	Lloyd 23'	Report	Han Peng 67'	Stadium: Estádio Nacional Mané Garrincha; Attendance: 300

December 14, 2014 Group Stage	Brazil	3–2	United States	Brasília, Brazil
	Marta 19', 55', 65'	Report	Lloyd 6'; Rapinoe 9'	Stadium: Estádio Nacional Mané Garrincha; Attendance: 5,421

December 18, 2014 Group Stage	United States	7–0	Argentina	Brasília, Brazil
19:20	Press 9', 23', 41', 78'; Lloyd 30', 44', 47'	Report		Stadium: Estádio Nacional Mané Garrincha

December 21, 2014 Final	Brazil	0–0 (a.e.t.)	United States	Brasília, Brazil
		Report		Stadium: Estádio Nacional Mané Garrincha; Attendance: 11,000

==== Under-23 ====
March 1 Six Nations Tournament	United States	1–0	Japan	La Manga, Spain
7:00 EST	Colaprico (yellow card) 35'; Ohai 56'	Report		Stadium: La Manga Stadium; Referee: (Norway) Marte Soro

March 3 Six Nations Tournament	United States	2–1	Sweden	La Manga, Spain
9:00 EST	Ubogagu 16'; Silva 31'	Report	Helin 61' (pen.)	Stadium: La Manga Stadium; Referee: (Iceland) Briet Bragadottir

March 5 Six Nations Tournament	United States	2–1	Norway	La Manga, Spain
8:00 EST	Shim 44'; Stengel 75'	Report	Ludvigsen 78'	Stadium: La Manga Stadium; Referee: (Iceland) Briet Bragadottir

==== Under-20 ====
January 9 CONCACAF Champ. Group A	United States	6–0	Costa Rica	George Town, Cayman Islands
19:30 EST	Horan 13', 24', 45+2'; Jordan 81'; Rowland (yellow card) 40'; Green 61'; Benevidez 86' (o.g.)	Report	Herrera (yellow card) 65'	Stadium: Truman Bodden Sports Complex; Attendance: 1,530; Referee: Melissa Borja (Honduras)

January 11 CONCACAF Champ. Group A	United States	3–0	Jamaica	George Town, Cayman Islands
19:30 EST	Horan 13', 24', 45+2'; Rowland (yellow card) 40'; Green 61'; Jordan 81'; Benevidez 86' (o.g.)	Report		Stadium: Truman Bodden Sports Complex; Attendance: 2,500; Referee: Marie-Soleil Beaudoin (Canada)

January 13 CONCACAF Champ. Group A	United States	10–0	Guatemala	George Town, Cayman Islands
19:30 EST	Meehan 8', 57', 74'; Jordan (yellow card) 17', (goal) 39' (pen.); Amack 22'; Basinger 31'; Hill 48' (pen.); Purce 54'; Weber 61', 68'	Report		Stadium: Truman Bodden Sports Complex; Attendance: 1,479; Referee: Melissa Borja (Honduras)

January 17 CONCACAF Champ. Semi-finals	United States	6–0	Trinidad and Tobago	George Town, Cayman Islands
19:00 EST	Meehan 13', 65'; Jordan 27'; Amack 33', 39'; Weber 86'	Report		Stadium: Truman Bodden Sports Complex; Attendance: 1,230; Referee: Carol Anne Chenard (Canada)

January 19 CONCACAF Champ. Finals	United States	4–0	Mexico	George Town, Cayman Islands
19:00 EST	Sullivan 9'; Jordan 59'; Purce 68'; Fuentes 90+3' (o.g.)	Report		Stadium: Truman Bodden Sports Complex; Attendance: 2,517; Referee: Carol Anne Chenard (Canada)

February 26 Friendly	United States	3–0	China	Lakewood Ranch, United States
16:00 EST	Horan 24', 78'; Purce 76'	Report		Stadium: Premier Sports Campus

March 1 Friendly	United States	5–1	China	Lakewood Ranch, United States
16:00 EST	Horan 15', 51'; Pugh 56', 71'; 77' (o.g.)	Report	7'	Stadium: Premier Sports Campus

August 5 U-20 World Cup, Group B	United States	0–2	Germany	Edmonton, Canada
20:00 PDT	Rose Lavelle (yellow card) 74'	Summary	Petermann 65'; Gidion (yellow card) 74'; Panfil 90'	Stadium: Commonwealth Stadium; Referee: (Japan) Sachiko Yamagishi

August 8 U-20 World Cup, Group B	United States	1–0	Brazil	Edmonton, Canada
20:00 PDT	Horan (yellow card) 39' (goal) 82'	Summary	Djenifer (yellow card) 27'; Patrica da silva (yellow card) 70'	Stadium: Commonwealth Stadium; Attendance: 10,025; Referee: (Finland) Kirsi Heikkinen

August 12 U-20 World Cup, Group B	United States	3–0	China	Moncton, Canada
17:00 EDT	Horan 19' 38'; Rose Lavelle 49'	Report		Stadium: Moncton Stadium; Attendance: 4,708; Referee: (Hungary) Katalin Kulcsár

16 August 2014 U-20 World Cup, Quarterfinals	North Korea	1–1 (a.e.t.) (3–1 p)	United States	Toronto, Canada
17:00 EDT	Jon So-yon 54' (pen.)	Report	Doniak 6'	Stadium: National Soccer Stadium; Attendance: 7,854; Referee: Bibiana Steinhaus (Germany)
	Penalties
	Jon So-yon (penalty scored); Choe Yun-gyong (penalty missed); Ri Kyong-hyang (penalty scored); Rim Se-ok (penalty scored)		(penalty missed) Jordan; (penalty missed) Horan; (penalty missed) Lavelle; (penalty scored) Amack

== American club leagues ==
=== Major League Soccer ===
==== Conference tables ====
Eastern Conference

Pos	Team	Pld	W	L	T	GF	GA	GD	Pts	Qualification
1	D.C. United	34	17	9	8	52	37	+15	59	Qualification for the conference semifinals
2	New England Revolution	34	17	13	4	51	37	+14	55	Qualification for the conference semifinals
3	Columbus Crew SC	34	14	10	10	52	42	+10	52	Qualification for the conference semifinals
4	New York Red Bulls	34	13	10	11	55	50	+5	50	Qualification for the knockout round
5	Sporting Kansas City	34	14	13	7	48	41	+7	49	Qualification for the knockout round
6	Philadelphia Union	34	10	12	12	51	51	0	42	
7	Toronto FC	34	11	15	8	44	54	−10	41	
8	Houston Dynamo	34	11	17	6	39	58	−19	39	
9	Chicago Fire	34	6	10	18	41	51	−10	36	
10	Montreal Impact	34	6	18	10	38	58	−20	28	

Source: MLS

Western Conference

Pos	Team	Pld	W	L	T	GF	GA	GD	Pts	Qualification
1	Seattle Sounders FC	34	20	10	4	65	50	+15	64	Qualification for the conference semifinals
2	LA Galaxy	34	17	7	10	69	37	+32	61	Qualification for the conference semifinals
3	Real Salt Lake	34	15	8	11	54	39	+15	56	Qualification for the conference semifinals
4	FC Dallas	34	16	12	6	55	45	+10	54	Qualification for the knockout round
5	Vancouver Whitecaps FC	34	12	8	14	42	40	+2	50	Qualification for the knockout round
6	Portland Timbers	34	12	9	13	61	52	+9	49	
7	Chivas USA	34	9	19	6	29	61	−32	33	
8	Colorado Rapids	34	8	18	8	43	62	−19	32	
9	San Jose Earthquakes	34	6	16	12	35	50	−15	30	

Source: MLS

==== Overall table ====
Note: the table below has no impact on playoff qualification and is used solely for determining host of the MLS Cup, certain CCL spots, the Supporters' Shield trophy, seeding in the 2014 Canadian Championship, and 2014 MLS draft. The conference tables are the sole determinant for teams qualifying for the playoffs.

Pos	Team	Pld	W	L	T	GF	GA	GD	Pts	Qualification
1	Seattle Sounders FC (S, U)	34	20	10	4	65	50	+15	64	Qualification for the CONCACAF Champions League
2	LA Galaxy (C)	34	17	7	10	69	37	+32	61	Qualification for the CONCACAF Champions League
3	D.C. United	34	17	9	8	52	37	+15	59	Qualification for the CONCACAF Champions League
4	Real Salt Lake	34	15	8	11	54	39	+15	56	Qualification for the CONCACAF Champions League
5	New England Revolution	34	17	13	4	51	46	+5	55	
6	FC Dallas	34	16	12	6	55	45	+10	54	
7	Columbus Crew	34	14	10	10	52	42	+10	52	
8	New York Red Bulls	34	13	10	11	55	50	+5	50	
9	Vancouver Whitecaps FC	34	12	8	14	42	40	+2	50	Qualification for the CONCACAF Champions League
10	Sporting Kansas City	34	14	13	7	48	41	+7	49	
11	Portland Timbers	34	12	9	13	61	52	+9	49	
12	Philadelphia Union	34	10	12	12	51	51	0	42	
13	Toronto FC	34	11	15	8	44	54	−10	41	
14	Houston Dynamo	34	11	17	6	39	58	−19	39	
15	Chicago Fire	34	6	10	18	41	51	−10	36	
16	Chivas USA	34	9	19	6	29	61	−32	33	
17	Colorado Rapids	34	8	18	8	43	62	−19	32	
18	San Jose Earthquakes	34	6	16	12	35	50	−15	30	
19	Montreal Impact (V)	34	6	18	10	38	58	−20	28	

Source: MLS
Rules for classification: 1) points; 2) head-to-head record; 3) goal difference; 4) number of goals scored
(C) MLS Cup champions; (S) Supporters' Shield winners; (U) U.S. Open Cup winners; (V) Canadian Championship winners

=== North American Soccer League ===
==== Spring Season ====
Pos	Team	Pld	W	D	L	GF	GA	GD	Pts	Qualification
1	Minnesota United (S)	9	6	2	1	16	9	+7	20	Playoffs
2	New York Cosmos	9	6	1	2	14	3	+11	19	
3	San Antonio Scorpions	9	5	2	2	13	9	+4	17	
4	Carolina RailHawks	9	4	2	3	11	15	−4	14	
5	Fort Lauderdale Strikers	9	4	1	4	18	18	0	13	
6	Ottawa Fury	9	3	1	5	14	13	+1	10	
7	Tampa Bay Rowdies	9	2	4	3	11	16	−5	10	
8	Atlanta Silverbacks	9	3	1	5	12	20	−8	10	
9	FC Edmonton	9	2	2	5	11	11	0	8	
10	Indy Eleven	9	0	4	5	14	20	−6	4	

Source: NASL Standings
(S) Spring season champion

==== Fall Season ====
Pos	Team	Pld	W	D	L	GF	GA	GD	Pts	Qualification
1	San Antonio Scorpions (F)	18	11	2	5	30	15	+15	35	Playoffs
2	Minnesota United	18	10	5	3	31	19	+12	35	
3	FC Edmonton	18	8	5	5	23	18	+5	29	
4	Fort Lauderdale Strikers	18	7	6	5	20	21	−1	27	
5	Carolina RailHawks	18	7	3	8	27	28	−1	24	
6	New York Cosmos	18	5	8	5	23	24	−1	23	
7	Indy Eleven	18	6	5	7	21	26	−5	23	
8	Tampa Bay Rowdies	18	5	5	8	25	34	−9	20	
9	Ottawa Fury	18	4	5	9	20	25	−5	17	
10	Atlanta Silverbacks	18	3	4	11	20	30	−10	13	

Source: NASL Standings
(F) Fall season champion

=== USL Pro ===
==== Overall table ====
Pos	Team	Pld	W	T	L	GF	GA	GD	Pts	Qualification
1	Orlando City (C)	28	19	5	4	56	24	+32	62	Commissioner's Cup, Playoffs
2	Sacramento Republic FC (A)	28	17	4	7	49	28	+21	55	Playoffs
3	LA Galaxy II (A)	28	15	6	7	54	38	+16	51	Playoffs
4	Richmond Kickers (A)	28	13	12	3	53	28	+25	51	Playoffs
5	Charleston Battery (A)	28	11	8	9	36	31	+5	41	Playoffs
6	Rochester Rhinos (A)	28	10	8	10	29	25	+4	38	Playoffs
7	Wilmington Hammerheads (A)	28	9	11	8	35	33	+2	38	Playoffs
8	Harrisburg City Islanders (A)	28	10	7	11	45	46	−1	37	Playoffs
9	Arizona United SC	28	10	5	13	32	47	−15	33 (Note: Arizona was deducted two points for fielding an ineligible player on June 21 against LA Galaxy II.)	
10	Oklahoma City Energy FC	28	9	5	14	32	37	−5	32	
11	Pittsburgh Riverhounds	28	9	5	14	35	49	−14	32	
12	Charlotte Eagles	28	9	4	15	33	40	−7	31	
13	Orange County Blues FC	28	9	1	18	31	54	−23	28	
14	Dayton Dutch Lions	28	6	4	18	28	63	−35	22	

Source: USL Pro official standings
Rules for classification: 1) points; 2) goal difference; 3) number of goals scored.
(A) Advances to USL Pro Playoffs; (C) Commissioner's Cup (best regular season record)

=== National Women's Soccer League ===
==== Overall table ====
Pos	Team	Pld	W	D	L	GF	GA	GD	Pts	Qualification
1	Seattle Reign FC	24	16	6	2	50	20	+30	54	NWSL Shield
2	FC Kansas City (C)	24	12	5	7	39	32	+7	41	NWSL Playoffs
3	Portland Thorns FC	24	10	6	8	39	35	+4	36	NWSL Playoffs
4	Washington Spirit	24	10	5	9	36	43	−7	35	NWSL Playoffs
5	Chicago Red Stars	24	9	8	7	32	26	+6	35	
6	Sky Blue FC	24	9	7	8	30	37	−7	34	
7	Western New York Flash	24	8	4	12	42	38	+4	28	
8	Boston Breakers	24	6	2	16	37	53	−16	20	
9	Houston Dash	24	5	3	16	23	44	−21	18	

Source: NWSL
Rules for classification: Tiebreakers
(C) Champions

== Honors ==
=== Professional ===
Men
Competition		Winner
U.S. Open Cup		Seattle Sounders FC
MLS Supporters' Shield		Seattle Sounders FC
MLS Cup		LA Galaxy
NASL	Spring season	Minnesota United FC
NASL	Fall season	San Antonio Scorpions
NASL	Regular season	Minnesota United FC
NASL	Soccer Bowl	San Antonio Scorpions
USL Pro	Regular season	Orlando City
USL Pro	Playoffs	Sacramento Republic

Women
Competition	Winner
NWSL Championship	FC Kansas City
NWSL Shield	Seattle Reign FC
W-League	Los Angeles Blues
Women's Premier Soccer League	Beach Futbol Club

=== Amateur ===
Men
Competition	Team
USL Premier Development League	Michigan Bucks
National Premier Soccer League	New York Red Bulls U-23
NCAA Division I Soccer Championship	University of Virginia
NCAA Division II Soccer Championship	Lynn University
NCAA Division III Soccer Championship	Tufts University
NAIA Soccer Championship	Davenport University (MI)
NJCAA Soccer Championship	Tyler Junior College (TX)

Women
Competition	Team
NCAA Division I Soccer Championship	Florida State University
NCAA Division II Soccer Championship	Grand Valley State
NCAA Division III Soccer Championship	Lynchburg College
NAIA Soccer Championship	Lindsey Wilson (KY)
NJCAA Soccer Championship	Monroe College (NY)

== American clubs in international competition ==
Club	Competition	Final round
LA Galaxy	2013–14 CONCACAF Champions League	Quarterfinals
Sporting Kansas City	2013–14 CONCACAF Champions League	Quarterfinals
San Jose Earthquakes	2013–14 CONCACAF Champions League	Quarterfinals
D.C. United	2014–15 CONCACAF Champions League	Quarterfinals
New York Red Bulls	2014–15 CONCACAF Champions League	Group stage
Sporting Kansas City	2014–15 CONCACAF Champions League	Group stage
Portland Timbers	2014–15 CONCACAF Champions League	Group stage

=== 2013–14 CONCACAF Champions League ===
==== LA Galaxy ====
March 12, 2014 Quarterfinals	LA Galaxy (United States)	1–0	(Mexico) Tijuana	StubHub Center, Carson
22:00	Samuel 11'	Report		Attendance: 15,159; Referee: Enrico Wijngaarde (Suriname)

March 18, 2014 Quarterfinals	Tijuana (Mexico)	4–2 (4–3 agg.)	(United States) LA Galaxy	Estadio Caliente, Tijuana
22:00	Ayoví 2', 9'; Benedetto 26'; Ruiz 82'	Report	Keane 47', 84'	Attendance: 19,333; Referee: Roberto Moreno (Panama)

==== Sporting Kansas City ====
March 12, 2014 Quarterfinals	Sporting Kansas City (United States)	1–0	(Mexico) Cruz Azul	Sporting Park, Kansas City
20:00	Ellis 17'	Report		Attendance: 18,467; Referee: Elmer Bonilla (El Salvador)

March 19, 2014 Quarterfinals	Cruz Azul (Mexico)	5–1 (5–2 agg.)	(United States) Sporting Kansas City	Estadio Azul, Mexico City
22:00	Pavone 2', 24', 55'; Formica 66'; Giménez 70'	Report	Feilhaber 44'	Referee: Walter López (Guatemala)

==== San Jose Earthquakes ====
March 11, 2014 Quarterfinals	San Jose Earthquakes (United States)	1–1	(Mexico) Toluca	Buck Shaw Stadium, Santa Clara
22:00	Gordon 90+5'	Report	Nava 67'	Attendance: 10,525; Referee: Wálter Quesada (Costa Rica)

March 19, 2014 Quarterfinals	Toluca (Mexico)	1–1 (a.e.t.) (5–4 p)	(United States) San Jose Earthquakes	Estadio Nemesio Díez, Toluca
20:00	Brizuela 69'	Report	Harden 56'	Attendance: 11,844; Referee: Héctor Rodríguez (Honduras)
	Penalties
	Nava (penalty missed); Ríos (penalty scored); Velázquez (penalty scored); Ponce (penalty scored); Talavera (penalty scored); Wilson Mathías (penalty scored)		(penalty missed) Wondolowski; (penalty scored) Gordon; (penalty scored) Cronin; (penalty scored) Schuler; (penalty scored) Koval; (penalty missed) Salinas
