= 2014 Seattle Sounders FC season =

American soccer team season

Seattle Sounders FC
2014 season
- General manager: Adrian Hanauer
- Head coach: Sigi Schmid
- Stadium: CenturyLink Field
- Major League Soccer: Conference: 1st Overall: 1st, Supporters' Shield
- MLS Cup playoffs: Conference finals
- U.S. Open Cup: Winners
- Top goalscorer: League: Obafemi Martins (17); All: Obafemi Martins (19)
- Highest home attendance: 64,207 vs. Portland (Jul. 13)
- Lowest home attendance: 38,441 vs. Toronto (Mar. 15)
- Average home league attendance: League: 43,734; Playoffs: 42,835; All: 43,619
- Biggest win: League: 4–0 vs. Salt Lake (May 31)
- Biggest defeat: League: 0–5 at New England (May 11)
Home colors	Away colors	Third colors

The 2014 Seattle Sounders FC season was the club's sixth season in Major League Soccer, the United States' top-tier of professional soccer. Including previous Seattle Sounders franchises, this was the 34th season of a soccer team playing in the Seattle metro area.

The Sounders earned a double for the first time in club history—winning their fourth U.S. Open Cup title and first Supporters' Shield as the best team in the MLS regular season. The team were the first to win 20 matches in the post-shootout era after a slow start to the season. During the 2014 season, the Sounders earned the most points (64) and scored the most goals (65) in the club's MLS history. The team's attempt to complete the league's first domestic treble in the MLS Cup Playoffs was halted by a loss to the LA Galaxy—Shield runners-up and later MLS Cup champions—in the Western Conference Final.

The 2014 season is the best Sounders' regular season to date. This is the only Supporters' Shield won by the club; moreover, this is the only time the team has finished atop the MLS Western Conference. Despite this, Seattle would go on to play in four MLS Cups in a five-season span between 2016 and 2020, winning in 2016 and 2019, and win the 2022 CONCACAF Champions League.

== Background and preseason ==
The 2013 season marked the second consecutive year that the Sounders had failed to win a trophy or title; the team had entered the playoffs with only one win in their final ten regular season matches and were eliminated in the Western Conference Semifinals to the Portland Timbers. The team had a 17–17–8 record in all competitions and increased tension between players and coaching staff. Sigi Schmid, entering his sixth season as head coach, consulted with key players in a series of summits and worked with general manager Adrian Hanauer to overhaul the team during the winter offseason. Major players, including goalkeeper Michael Gspurning, midfielder Mauro Rosales, and forward Eddie Johnson, were traded to other teams or released. New signings—described by majority owner Joe Roth as "more plumbers and less dancers"—included goalkeeper Stefan Frei, defender Chad Marshall, and several MLS veterans. A majority of the 37 players who reported to the Sounders training camp in January 2014 were new to the club.

During the winter offseason, midfielder Clint Dempsey joined his former club, Fulham FC in England's Premier League, for a two-month loan spell. Because Major League Soccer's season begins in Spring, and the Premier League begins in Fall, Dempsey did not miss any of Sounders' competitive matches, though he was not with the team for pre-season training. During the loan period, Fulham's manager René Meulensteen was replaced by Felix Magath, prompting some concerns from Sounders supporters that Dempsey was not getting the competitive experience that was the purpose for the loan.

Seattle Sounders FC's 2013-2014 winter included bringing in several new faces to further supplement the returning core. Forward Kenny Cooper (trade with FC Dallas for Adam Moffat), midfielder Marco Pappa (acquired through league Allocation Ranking rules), defender Chad Marshall (trade with Columbus Crew for an undisclosed amount allocation money and a third-round draft pick), and goalkeeper Stefan Frei (trade with Toronto FC for a conditional first-round draft pick in the 2015 SuperDraft) are the most high-profile names. These four are expected to step into the first eleven, or at least see significant playing time.

Other players acquired include midfielder Tristan Bowen (trade with Chivas USA for Mauro Rosales), forward Chad Barrett (acquired with thirteenth pick in 2014 MLS Re-Entry Draft), and defender Jalil Anibaba (trade with Chicago Fire for Patrick Ianni and Jhon Kennedy Hurtado).

Seattle also signed Stanford's Aaron Kovar and Wake Forest's Sean Okoli to Homegrown Player contracts. Both players played for Sounders FC's academy team before beginning their respective college careers.

Seattle selected Damion Lowe, Stefano Rijssel, Fabio Pereira, and Jimmy Ockford in the 2014 MLS SuperDraft.

== Roster ==
Major League Soccer teams are limited to eight players without U.S. citizenship, a permanent resident (green card holder), or the holder of other special status (e.g., refugee or asylum status). These international roster slots can be traded. Note: Flags indicate national team as defined under FIFA eligibility rules; some limited exceptions apply. Players may hold more than one non-FIFA nationality. Squad correct as of April 3, 2014.

No.	Pos.	Nation	Player
1	GK	USA	Marcus Hahnemann
2	MF	USA	Clint Dempsey (DP)
3	MF	USA	Brad Evans (c)
4	DF	USA	Jalil Anibaba
5	MF	ENG	Andy Rose
6	MF	CUB	Osvaldo Alonso (DP)
7	FW	USA	Tristan Bowen
8	MF	MEX	Gonzalo Pineda (INT)
9	FW	NGA	Obafemi Martins (INT/DP)
10	MF	GUA	Marco Pappa (INT)
11	MF	USA	Aaron Kovar (HGP)
12	DF	CRC	Leonardo González
13	FW	USA	Sean Okoli (HGP)
14	DF	USA	Chad Marshall
15	DF	USA	Dylan Remick
17	DF	USA	DeAndre Yedlin (HGP)
18	DF	MLI	Djimi Traoré (INT)
19	FW	USA	Chad Barrett
20	DF	USA	Zach Scott
22	FW	USA	Eriq Zavaleta (GA/on loan at Chivas USA)
23	FW	USA	Cam Weaver
24	GK	SUI	Stefan Frei
27	MF	USA	Lamar Neagle
29	GK	USA	Josh Ford
31	DF	JAM	Damion Lowe (INT/GA)
33	FW	USA	Kenny Cooper
42	MF	UGA	Micheal Azira
77	FW	MTQ	Kévin Parsemain (INT)
—	DF	USA	Jimmy Ockford (on loan at New York Cosmos)

== Competitions ==
=== Preseason ===
February 5, 2014	Seattle Sounders FC	2–1	San Jose Earthquakes	Tucson, Arizona
10:00 (PST)	Martins 27', 29'; Lowe (yellow card) 79'	Report	Schuler (yellow card) 2'; Lenhart (yellow card) 22'; Harris (yellow card) 51'; Fucito 86'	Stadium: Kino Stadium

February 6, 2014	Seattle Sounders FC	2–1	Vancouver Whitecaps FC	Tucson, Arizona
11:30 (PST)	Pereira 8'; Parsemain 17'	Report	Hurtado 46'; Harvey (yellow card) 48'	Stadium: Kino Stadium

February 8, 2014	Seattle Sounders FC	0–0	Portland Timbers	Tucson, Arizona
17:00 (PST)	Bowen (yellow card) 30'; Yedlin (yellow card) 41'	Report	Kah (yellow card) 26'; Powell (yellow card) 49'; Danso (yellow card) 81'	Stadium: Kino Stadium

February 9, 2014	Seattle Sounders FC	2–1	Vancouver Whitecaps FC	Tucson, Arizona
10:30 (PST)	Parsemain 23'; Barrett (yellow card) 47'; Rose 50'; Estrada (yellow card) 76'	Report	Mitchell 78'	Stadium: Kino Stadium

March 1, 2014	Seattle Sounders FC	2–1	Coastal Carolina Chanticleers	Charleston, South Carolina
6:30 (PST)	Parsemain 49'; Kovar 58'	Report	30'	Stadium: Blackbaud Stadium

==== Carolina Challenge Cup ====
February 22, 2014	Charleston Battery	1–2	Seattle Sounders FC	Charleston, South Carolina
16:15 (PST)	Falvey 28', (yellow card) 73'; Mueller (yellow card) 51'; Kelly (yellow card) 71'; Azira (yellow card) 79'	Report	Alonso 25', (yellow card) 77'; Evans 89' (pen.)	Stadium: Blackbaud Stadium

February 26, 2014	Seattle Sounders FC	1–1	Houston Dynamo	Charleston, South Carolina
14:00 (PST)	Martins 44'	Report	Davis 14'; Arena (yellow card) 72'	Stadium: Blackbaud Stadium

March 1, 2014	Seattle Sounders FC	2–2	D.C. United	Charleston, South Carolina
14:00 (PST)	Cooper 24'; Pappa 63'	Report	Espíndola 8' (pen.); Kitchen 53'; Boswell (yellow card) 65'; Christian (red card) 76'	Stadium: Blackbaud Stadium

=== MLS regular season ===
==== Standings ====
===== Western Conference =====
Pos	Team	Pld	W	L	T	GF	GA	GD	Pts	Qualification
1	Seattle Sounders FC	34	20	10	4	65	50	+15	64	MLS Cup Conference Semifinals
2	LA Galaxy	34	17	7	10	69	37	+32	61	MLS Cup Conference Semifinals
3	Real Salt Lake	34	15	8	11	54	39	+15	56	MLS Cup Conference Semifinals
4	FC Dallas	34	16	12	6	55	45	+10	54	MLS Cup Knockout round
5	Vancouver Whitecaps FC	34	12	8	14	42	40	+2	50	MLS Cup Knockout round
6	Portland Timbers	34	12	9	13	61	52	+9	49	
7	Chivas USA	34	9	19	6	29	61	−32	33	
8	Colorado Rapids	34	8	18	8	43	62	−19	32	
9	San Jose Earthquakes	34	6	16	12	35	50	−15	30	

Source: MLS

===== Overall table =====
Note: the table below has no impact on playoff qualification and is used solely for determining host of the MLS Cup, certain CCL spots, and 2015 MLS draft. The conference tables are the sole determinant for teams qualifying to the playoffs

Pos	Team	Pld	W	L	T	GF	GA	GD	Pts	Qualification
1	Seattle Sounders FC (S)	34	20	10	4	65	50	+15	64	CONCACAF Champions League
2	LA Galaxy (C)	34	17	7	10	69	37	+32	61	CONCACAF Champions League
3	D.C. United	34	17	9	8	52	37	+15	59	CONCACAF Champions League
4	Real Salt Lake	34	15	8	11	54	39	+15	56	CONCACAF Champions League
5	New England Revolution	34	17	13	4	51	46	+5	55	
6	FC Dallas	34	16	12	6	55	45	+10	54	
7	Columbus Crew	34	14	10	10	52	42	+10	52	
8	New York Red Bulls	34	13	10	11	55	50	+5	50	
9	Vancouver Whitecaps FC	34	12	8	14	42	40	+2	50	CONCACAF Champions League
10	Sporting Kansas City	34	14	13	7	48	41	+7	49	
11	Portland Timbers	34	12	9	13	61	52	+9	49	
12	Philadelphia Union	34	10	12	12	51	51	0	42	
13	Toronto FC	34	11	15	8	44	54	−10	41	
14	Houston Dynamo	34	11	17	6	39	58	−19	39	
15	Chicago Fire	34	6	10	18	41	51	−10	36	
16	Chivas USA	34	9	19	6	29	61	−32	33	
17	Colorado Rapids	34	8	18	8	43	62	−19	32	
18	San Jose Earthquakes	34	6	16	12	35	50	−15	30	
19	Montreal Impact	34	6	18	10	38	58	−20	28	

Source: MLS
Rules for classification: 1) points; 2) head-to-head record; 3) goal difference; 4) number of goals scored
(C) MLS Cup Champion; (S) Supporters' Shield

==== Results summary ====
Overall								Home						Away					
Pld	Pts	W	L	T	GF	GA	GD	W	L	T	GF	GA	GD	W	L	T	GF	GA	GD
34	64	20	10	4	65	50	+15	12	4	1	31	16	+15	8	6	3	34	34	0

Source: MLS Fact and Record Book
Pld = Matches played; Pts = Points; W = Matches won; T = Matches tied; L = Matches lost; GF = Goals for; GA = Goals against; GD = Goal difference

==== Results by round ====
Round	1	2	3	4	5	6	7	8	9	10	11	12	13	14	15	16	17	18	19	20	21	22	23	24	25	26	27	28	29	30	31	32	33	34
Stadium	H	H	A	H	A	A	A	H	H	H	A	H	A	H	A	A	A	H	H	A	H	A	H	A	H	A	H	A	A	H	A	H	A	H
Result	W	L	W	L	D	W	W	W	W	W	L	W	D	W	W	W	L	W	L	L	W	L	D	W	W	W	W	L	L	W	W	L	D	W

Updated to match(es) played on September 27, 2014. Source: MLS Results
A = Away; H = Home; W = Win; D = Draw; L = Loss

==== Match results ====
Win Tie Loss

March 8, 2014 MLS 1	Seattle Sounders FC	1–0	Sporting Kansas City	Seattle, Washington, U.S.
12:00 (PST)	Cooper (yellow card) 34'; Alonso (yellow card) 44'; Barrett 90+4'	Boxscore	Collin (yellow card) 16'; Feilhaber (yellow card) 46'; Sapong (yellow card) 83'	Stadium: CenturyLink Field; Attendance: 39,240; Referee: Alan Kelly

March 15, 2014 MLS 2	Seattle Sounders FC	1–2	Toronto FC	Seattle, Washington, U.S.
13:30 (PDT)	Dempsey 68'; Alonso (yellow card) 70'	Boxscore	Defoe 17', 24'; Rey (yellow card) 63'; Morrow (yellow card) 78'; Júlio César (yellow card) 83'	Stadium: CenturyLink Field; Attendance: 38,441; Referee: Ioannis Stravrides

March 23, 2014 MLS 3	Montreal Impact	0–2	Seattle Sounders FC	Montreal, Quebec
13:00 (PDT)	Camara (yellow card) 45+1'	Boxscore	Neagle 8'; Martins 58'	Stadium: Olympic Stadium; Attendance: 27,207; Referee: Armando Villarreal

March 29, 2014 MLS 4	Seattle Sounders FC	1–2	Columbus Crew	Seattle, Washington, U.S.
19:00 (PDT)	Cooper 22'; Traoré (red card) 58'; Azira (yellow card) 87'	Boxscore	Jiménez (yellow card) 8'; Higuaín 59' (pen.); Trapp (yellow card) 68'; Meram 90+4'	Stadium: CenturyLink Field; Attendance: 38,469; Referee: Allen Chapman

April 5, 2014 MLS 5 Cascadia Cup	Portland Timbers	4–4	Seattle Sounders FC	Portland, Oregon, U.S.
12:00 (PDT)	Chará 9', 55', (yellow card) 50'; Valeri 14'; Kah (yellow card) 33'; Johnson (yellow card) 35'; Urruti 57'; Paparatto (yellow card) 66'	Boxscore	Cooper 3'; Azira (yellow card) 5'; Dempsey 24', 85', 87' (pen.); Pineda (yellow card) 29'; Yedlin (yellow card) 70'	Stadium: Providence Park; Attendance: 20,814; Referee: Hilario Grajeda

April 12, 2014 MLS 6	FC Dallas	2–3	Seattle Sounders FC	Frisco, Texas, U.S.
17:30 (PDT)	Texeira 10', (yellow card) 45+2'; Watson (yellow card) 19'; Michel 42' (pen.); Thomas (yellow card) 46'; Castillo (yellow card) 60'	Boxscore	Neagle (yellow card) 12'; Alonso (yellow card) 18'; Dempsey 22', 85'; Yedlin (yellow card) 40'; Keel 75' (o.g.); Barrett (yellow card) 90+4'	Stadium: FC Dallas Stadium; Attendance: 17,070; Referee: Juan Guzman

April 19, 2014 MLS 7	Chivas USA	1–2	Seattle Sounders FC	Carson, California, U.S.
19:30 (PDT)	Torres 5' (pen.); Barrera (yellow card) 28'; Alvarez (yellow card) 71'; Delgado (red card) 73'; Toia (yellow card) 90+3'	Boxscore	Neagle 24'; González (yellow card) 31'; Martins 81'	Stadium: StubHub Center; Attendance: 7,499; Referee: Ismail Elfath

April 26, 2014 MLS 8	Seattle Sounders FC	4–1	Colorado Rapids	Seattle, Washington, U.S.
13:00 (PDT)	Neagle 45+1'; Dempsey 47', 52'; Martins 75'	Boxscore	Piermayr (yellow card) 26'; Torres (yellow card) 37'; Serna 62'	Stadium: CenturyLink Field; Attendance: 38,582; Referee: Armando Villarreal

May 3, 2014 MLS 9	Seattle Sounders FC	2–1	Philadelphia Union	Seattle, Washington, U.S.
19:00 (PDT)	Martins 61'; Marshall 84'; Dempsey (yellow card) 90+1'	Boxscore	Evans 13' (o.g.); Williams (yellow card) 31'; Edu (yellow card) 35'	Stadium: CenturyLink Field; Attendance: 38,516; Referee: Silviu Petrescu

May 7, 2014 MLS 10	Seattle Sounders FC	2–1	FC Dallas	Seattle, Washington, U.S.
19:00 (PDT)	Evans (yellow card) 37'; Pappa (yellow card) 42'; Neagle 62'; Cooper 88'	Boxscore	Michel 16', (yellow card) 17'; Hedges (yellow card) 23'; Pérez (yellow card) 48'	Stadium: CenturyLink Field; Attendance: 38,489; Referee: Baldomero Toledo

May 11, 2014 MLS 11	New England Revolution	5–0	Seattle Sounders FC	Foxborough, Massachusetts
15:00 (PDT)	Mullins 14'; Fagundez 29', 41'; Bunbury 36'; Marshall 46' (o.g.)	Boxscore	Traore (yellow card) 45+1'; Pineda (yellow card) 73'	Stadium: Gillette Stadium; Attendance: 11,293; Referee: Jose Carlos Rivero

May 17, 2014 MLS 12	Seattle Sounders FC	1–0	San Jose Earthquakes	Seattle, Washington, U.S.
19:00 (PDT)	Martins 8'; Pineda (yellow card) 90'	Boxscore		Stadium: CenturyLink Field; Attendance: 49,746; Referee: Jair Marrufo

May 24, 2014 MLS 13 Cascadia Cup	Vancouver Whitecaps FC	2–2	Seattle Sounders FC	Vancouver, British Columbia
16:00 (PDT)	Hurtado 39'; Koffie (yellow card) 43', (goal) 66'; Laba (yellow card) 44'; Fernandez (yellow card) 68'	Boxscore	Barrett 36'; Pineda 82' (pen.); Alonso (yellow card) 90+2'	Stadium: BC Place; Attendance: 21,000; Referee: Ismail Elfath

May 31, 2014 MLS 14	Seattle Sounders FC	4–0	Real Salt Lake	Seattle, Washington, U.S.
13:00 (PDT)	Pineda 42' (pen.); Pappa 55'; Barrett 62'; Evans (yellow card) 80'; Martins 90'	Boxscore	Beltran (yellow card) 43'; Borchers (yellow card) 76'	Stadium: CenturyLink Field; Attendance: 39,245; Referee: Ricardo Salazar

June 7, 2014 MLS 15	Chicago Fire	2–3	Seattle Sounders FC	Bridgeview, Illinois, U.S.
17:30 (PDT)	Ritter (yellow card) 8'; Hurtado (yellow card) 24' (red card) 37'; Shipp 41', 82'; Amarikwa (yellow card) 90+2'	Boxscore	Martins (yellow card) 8', (goal) 31', 38' (pen.), (red card) 42'; Neagle 78'; González (yellow card) 90+2'; Frei (yellow card) 90+3'	Stadium: Toyota Park; Attendance: 16,416; Referee: Chris Penso

June 28, 2014 MLS 16	D.C. United	0–1	Seattle Sounders FC	Washington DC, U.S.
16:00 (PDT)		Boxscore	Alonso (yellow card) 20'; Barrett 39'; Pineda (yellow card) 87'	Stadium: RFK Stadium; Attendance: 16,922; Referee: Silviu Petrescu

July 5, 2014 MLS 17 Cascadia Cup	Vancouver Whitecaps FC	1–0	Seattle Sounders FC	Vancouver, BC, Canada
19:00 (PDT)	Fernandez 12'	Boxscore	Barrett (yellow card) 79'	Stadium: BC Place Stadium; Attendance: 22,500; Referee: Baldomero Toledo

July 13, 2014 MLS 18 Cascadia Cup	Seattle Sounders FC	2–0	Portland Timbers	Seattle, Washington, U.S.
19:30 (PDT)	Alonso (yellow card) 31'; Clint Dempsey 71'; Marco Pappa 86'	Boxscore	Jewsbury (yellow card) 68'; Valeri (yellow card) 71'; Wallace (yellow card) 90+2'	Stadium: CenturyLink Field; Attendance: 64,207; Referee: Alan Kelly

July 28, 2014 MLS 19	Seattle Sounders FC	0–3	LA Galaxy	Seattle, Washington, U.S.
19:00 (PDT)	Anibaba (yellow card) 69'; Pineda (yellow card) 79'	Boxscore	Zardes 8'; Donovan 18' (yellow card) 27'; Ishizaki 36'; Gonzalez (yellow card) 45+3'	Stadium: CenturyLink Field; Attendance: 39,304; Referee: Hilario Grajeda

August 2, 2014 MLS 20 Heritage Cup	San Jose Earthquakes	1–0	Seattle Sounders FC	Santa Clara, California, U.S.
19:30 (PDT)	Yannick Djaló 42'	Boxscore		Stadium: Levi's Stadium; Attendance: 48,765; Referee: Ismail Elfath

August 10, 2014 MLS 21	Seattle Sounders FC	2–0	Houston Dynamo	Seattle, Washington, U.S.
19:30 (PDT)	Neagle (yellow card) 28'; Martins (yellow card) 33' (yellow-red card) 86'; Pappa 69'; Pineda 75' (pen.), (yellow card) 55'; González (yellow card) 81'	Boxscore	Garrido (yellow card) 60'; Sarkodie (yellow card) 90+4'	Stadium: CenturyLink Field; Attendance: 50,276; Referee: Chris Penso

August 16, 2014 MLS 22	Real Salt Lake	2–1	Seattle Sounders FC	Sandy, Utah, U.S.
11:30 (PDT)	Plata 53'; Mulholland 57'; García (yellow card) 14'	Boxscore	Scott (yellow card) 15'; Yedlin (yellow card) 60'; Barrett 72'	Stadium: Rio Tinto Stadium; Attendance: 20,483; Referee: Silviu Petrescu

August 20, 2014 MLS 23 Heritage Cup	Seattle Sounders FC	1–1	San Jose Earthquakes	Seattle, Washington, U.S.
19:00 (PDT)	Yedlin (yellow card) 29'; Barrett 46'; Martins (yellow card) 77'	Boxscore	Wondolowski 65'; Koval (yellow card) 90'	Stadium: CenturyLink Field; Attendance: 38,509; Referee: Drew Fischer

August 24, 2014 MLS 24 Cascadia Cup	Portland Timbers	2–4	Seattle Sounders FC	Portland, Oregon, U.S.
14:00 (PDT)	Ridgewell (yellow card) 23'; Paparatto (yellow card) 38'; Urruti (yellow card) 64'; Adi 73', 90+1'	Boxscore	Martins 18', 76', (yellow card) 77'; Dempsey 34'; Marshall (yellow card) 46'; Scott (yellow card) 53'; Alonso (yellow card) 61'; Barrett 70'	Stadium: Providence Park; Attendance: 20814; Referee: Baldemedo Toledo

August 30, 2014 MLS 25	Seattle Sounders FC	1–0	Colorado Rapids	Seattle, Washington, U.S.
13:00 (PDT)	Evans (yellow card) 40'; Dempsey 52'; Scott (yellow card) 62'	Boxscore	Brown (yellow card) 84'	Stadium: CenturyLink Field; Attendance: 38,934; Referee: Hilario Grejeda

September 3, 2014 MLS 26	Chivas USA	2–4	Seattle Sounders FC	Carson, California, U.S.
19:30 (PDT)	Burling (yellow card) 49'; Delgado 51'; Finley 60' (pen.); Minda (yellow card) 72'	Boxscore	Martins 11', 16'; Rose 38', 42'	Stadium: StubHub Center; Attendance: 4,021; Referee: Ted Unkel

September 12, 2014 MLS 27	Seattle Sounders FC	3–2	Real Salt Lake	Seattle, Washington, U.S.
19:30 (PDT)	Neagle (yellow card) 25', (goal) 38'; Martins 43'; Rose 90+4'	Boxscore	Morales 30'; Plata 50'; Borchers (red card) 68'; Wingert (yellow card) 71'	Stadium: CenturyLink Field; Attendance: 38,976; Referee: Kevin Stot

September 20, 2014 MLS 28	New York Red Bulls	4–1	Seattle Sounders FC	Harrison, New Jersey, U.S.
11:30 (PDT)	Wright-Phillips 1', 54' (pen.), 56'; Cahill 65'	Boxscore	Dempsey 62'	Stadium: Red Bull Arena; Attendance: 25,000; Referee: Alan Kelly

September 24, 2014 MLS 29	FC Dallas	3–1	Seattle Sounders FC	Frisco, Texas, U.S.
18:00 (PDT)	Texeira 8', 78', (yellow card) 79'; Michel (yellow card) 44'; Perez 88'	Boxscore	Neagle 58'	Stadium: Toyota Stadium; Attendance: 14,601; Referee: Mark Geiger

September 27, 2014 MLS 30	Seattle Sounders FC	4–2	Chivas USA	Seattle, Washington, U.S.
13:00 (PDT)	Martins 14', 51'; Neagle 37'; Dempsey 45+1'	Boxscore	Torres 12'; Minda (yellow card) 13'; Anibaba 18' (o.g.); Burling (yellow card) 78'	Stadium: CenturyLink Field; Attendance: 38,713; Referee: Drew Fischer

October 5, 2014 MLS 31	Colorado Rapids	1–4	Seattle Sounders FC	Commerce City, Colorado, U.S.
12:00 (PDT)	Brown 43'; O'Neil (yellow card) 44'; LaBrocca (yellow card) 63'	Boxscore	Dempsey 11' (pen.); Evans (yellow card) 21'; Martins 28', 70'; Pappa 33', (yellow card) 75'	Stadium: Dick's Sporting Goods Park; Attendance: 17,609; Referee: Edvin Jurisevic

October 10, 2014 MLS 32 Cascadia Cup	Seattle Sounders FC	0–1	Vancouver Whitecaps FC	Seattle, Washington, U.S.
19:00 (PDT)	González (yellow card) 41'; Dempsey (yellow card) 64'	Boxscore	Manneh 45'; Waston (yellow card) 75'; Laba (yellow card) 85'	Stadium: CenturyLink Field; Attendance: 55,765; Referee: Jair Marrufo

October 19, 2014 MLS 33	LA Galaxy	2–2	Seattle Sounders FC	Carson, California, U.S.
17:30 (PDT)	Rogers (yellow card) 22'; Gonzalez (yellow card) 43' (red card) 88'; Husidic 45+1'; Sarvas 50'	Boxscore	Scott (yellow card) 26'; Pineda (yellow card) 27'; Dempsey (yellow card) 36', (goal) 69'; Martins (yellow card) 58'; Neagle 72'	Stadium: StubHub Center; Attendance: 27,244; Referee: Ismail Elfath

October 25, 2014 MLS 34	Seattle Sounders FC	2–0	LA Galaxy	Seattle, Washington, U.S.
12:00 (PDT)	Dempsey (yellow card) 15'; Scott (yellow card) 51'; Pineda (yellow card) 71'; Pappa 85', 90+5'	Boxscore	Gargan (yellow card) 22'; Donovan (yellow card) 38'; Sarvas (yellow card) 71'	Stadium: CenturyLink Field; Attendance: 57,673; Referee: Mark Geiger
Note: Seattle clinched Supporters' Shield with win.

=== MLS Cup Playoffs ===
==== Conference Semifinals ====
November 2, 2014 First leg	FC Dallas	1–1	Seattle Sounders FC	Frisco, Texas, U.S.
18:00 PDT	Michel 34'	Report	Alonso 54'; González (yellow card) 74'	Stadium: Toyota Stadium; Attendance: 16,112; Referee: Alan Chapman

November 10, 2014 Second leg	Seattle Sounders FC	0–0 (1a–1 agg.)	FC Dallas	Seattle, Washington, U.S.
19:00 PDT		Report	Hernandez (yellow card) 14'	Stadium: CenturyLink Field; Attendance: 38,912; Referee: Baldomero Toledo

==== Conference Finals ====
November 23, 2014 First leg	LA Galaxy	1–0	Seattle Sounders FC	Carson, California, U.S.
14:00 PST	DeLaGarza (yellow card) 8'; Ishizaki (yellow card) 35'; Sarvas 52'	Report	Yedlin (yellow card) 3'; Scott (yellow card) 37'	Stadium: StubHub Center; Attendance: 27,000; Referee: Kevin Stott

November 30, 2014 Second leg	Seattle Sounders FC	2–1 (2–2a agg.)	LA Galaxy	Seattle, Washington, U.S.
18:00 PST	Evans 26'; Dempsey 32'	Report	Sarvas (yellow card) 35'; Juninho 54'; Penedo (yellow card) 90+2'	Stadium: CenturyLink Field; Attendance: 46,758; Referee: Jair Marrufo

=== U.S. Open Cup ===
June 18, 2014 Fourth round	Seattle Sounders FC	5–0	PSA Elite	Tukwila, Washington
19:00 (PDT)	Evans 23' (pen.); Scott 40'; Cooper 45', 56'; Okoli 84'	Report; Box Score		Stadium: Starfire Sports Complex; Attendance: 3,718; Referee: Baboucarr Jallow

June 24, 2014 Fifth round	Seattle Sounders FC	1–1 (a.e.t.) (4–1 p)	San Jose Earthquakes	Tukwila, Washington
19:30 (PDT)	Cooper 26'	Recap; Box Score	Harris (yellow card) 19'; Lenhart 24' (yellow card) 34'; Francis (yellow card) 49'; Gordon (yellow card) 113'	Stadium: Starfire Sports Complex; Attendance: 4,023; Referee: Mark Kadlecik
	Penalties
	(penalty scored) Pineda; (penalty scored) Pappa; (penalty scored) Evans; (penalty scored) Neagle		Stephenson (penalty scored); Gordon (penalty missed); Koval (penalty missed)

July 9, 2014 Quarterfinals	Seattle Sounders FC	3–1 (a.e.t.)	Portland Timbers	Tukwila, Washington
19:30 (PDT)	Scott (yellow card) 23'; Pineda (yellow card) 67'; Alonso 69' (yellow card) 94'; Cooper 110'; Pappa 115'	Recap; Box Score	Fernandez (yellow card) 16'; Nagbe 90+3'; Chara (red card) 99'	Stadium: Starfire Sports Complex

August 13, 2014 Semifinals	Seattle Sounders FC	6–0	Chicago Fire	Tukwila, Washington
19:30 (PDT)	Barrett 6' Rose 33', 58'; Neagle (yellow card) 73'; Martins 79'; Cooper 83', 84'	Report	Cocis (yellow card) 17'; Palmer (yellow card) 55'; Soumaré (yellow card) 70'; Segares (yellow card) 82'	Stadium: Starfire Sports Complex; Attendance: 4,361; Referee: Jair Marrufo

September 16, 2014 Final	Philadelphia Union	1–3 (a.e.t.)	Seattle Sounders FC	Chester, Pennsylvania
16:30 (PDT)	Edu 38'; Casey (yellow card) 57'	boxscore	Alonso (yellow card) 25'; Barrett 47'; Dempsey 101'; Martins 114'	Stadium: PPL Park; Attendance: 15,256; Referee: Armando Villareal

=== Friendlies ===
July 6, 2014	Seattle Sounders FC (United States)	0–2	(Canada) FC Edmonton	Tukwila, Washington
18:00 (PDT)		Report	Raudales 25'; James 85'	Stadium: Starfire Sports

July 19, 2014	Seattle Sounders FC (United States)	3–3	(England) Tottenham Hotspur	Seattle, Washington
	Pineda 33' (pen.); Alonso 49'; Bowen 78'	Report	Holtby 11'; Soldado 55' (pen.); Falque 82' (pen.)	Stadium: CenturyLink Field; Attendance: 56,385; Referee: Ted Unkle

== Statistics ==
=== Appearances ===
Numbers outside parentheses denote appearances as starter.
Numbers in parentheses denote appearances as substitute.
Players with no appearances are not included in the list.

As of match played June 7, 2014

No.	Pos.	Nat.	Name	MLS	U.S. Open Cup	Total
No.	Pos.	Nat.	Name	Apps	Apps	Apps
1	GK	USA	Marcus Hahnemann	0	2	2
2	MF	USA	Clint Dempsey	8(1)	0	8(1)
3	MF	USA	Brad Evans	8(3)	2	10(3)
4	DF	USA	Jalil Anibaba	5(2)	1(1)	6(3)
5	MF	ENG	Andy Rose	1(3)	0	1(3)
6	MF	CUB	Osvaldo Alonso	16	0	16
8	MF	MEX	Gonzalo Pineda	14(1)	1	15(1)
9	FW	NGA	Obafemi Martins	15	0	15
10	MF	GUA	Marco Pappa	11(3)	1	12(3)
11	MF	USA	Aaron Kovar	0(1)	1	1(1)
12	DF	CRC	Leonardo Gonzalez	8(3)	2	10(3)
13	FW	USA	Sean Okoli	0(2)	1	1(2)
14	DF	USA	Chad Marshall	15	1	16
15	DF	USA	Dylan Remick	6(3)	0	6(3)
16	DF	USA	David Estrada	0(1)	1	1(1)
17	DF	USA	DeAndre Yedlin	11	0	11
18	DF	MLI	Djimi Traore	10	0	10
19	FW	USA	Chad Barrett	4(7)	0(2)	4(9)
20	DF	USA	Zach Scott	4(2)	2	6(2)
21	MF	BRA	Fabio Pereira	0	0(1)	0(1)
23	FW	USA	Cam Weaver	0(2)	2	2(2)
24	GK	SUI	Stefan Frei	16	0	16
27	MF	USA	Lamar Neagle	14(1)	1(1)	15(2)
33	FW	USA	Kenny Cooper	8(7)	2	10(7)
42	MF	UGA	Micheal Azira	2(5)	2	4(5)

=== Goals and assists ===
As of match played November 2, 2014

No.	Pos.	Name	MLS		U.S. Open Cup		MLS Cup Playoffs		Total	
No.	Pos.	Name	Goals	Assists	Goals	Assists	Goals	Assists	Goals	Assists
2	MF	(United States) Clint Dempsey	15	10	1	0	0	0	16	10
3	MF	(United States) Brad Evans	0	5	1	1	0	0	1	6
4	DF	(United States) Jalil Anibaba	0	1	0	0	0	0	0	1
5	MF	(England) Andy Rose	3	1	2	0	0	0	5	1
6	MF	(Cuba) Osvaldo Alonso	0	2	1	0	1	0	2	2
8	MF	(Mexico) Gonzalo Pineda	3	7	0	1	0	0	3	8
9	FW	(Nigeria) Obafemi Martins	17	13	2	2	0	0	19	15
10	MF	(Guatemala) Marco Pappa	6	5	1	2	0	1	7	8
11	MF	(United States) Aaron Kovar	0	0	0	1	0	0	0	1
12	MF	(Costa Rica) Leonardo Gonzalez	0	0	0	1	0	0	0	1
13	FW	(United States) Sean Okoli	0	0	1	0	0	0	1	0
14	DF	(United States) Chad Marshall	1	3	0	0	0	0	1	3
16	DF	(United States) David Estrada	0	0	0	1	0	0	0	1
17	DF	(United States) DeAndre Yedlin	0	3	0	1	0	0	0	4
19	FW	(United States) Chad Barrett	7	1	2	1	0	0	9	2
20	DF	(United States) Zach Scott	0	0	1	2	0	0	1	2
27	MF	(United States) Lamar Neagle	9	9	0	1	0	0	9	10
33	FW	(United States) Kenny Cooper	3	4	6	2	0	0	9	6
			1	0	0	0	0	0	1	0
Total			65	64	18	16	1	1	84	81

=== Disciplinary record ===
As of match played October 19, 2014

No.	Pos.	Name	MLS		U.S. Open Cup		Total	
No.	Pos.	Name	Booked	Sent off (straight red)	Booked	Sent off (straight red)	Booked	Sent off (straight red)
2	MF	(United States) Clint Dempsey	3	0	0	0	3	0
3	MF	(United States) Brad Evans	4	0	0	0	4	0
4	DF	(United States) Jalil Anibaba	1	0	0	0	1	0
6	MF	(Cuba) Osvaldo Alonso	7	0	2	0	9	0
8	MF	(Mexico) Gonzalo Pineda	8	0	1	0	9	0
9	FW	(Nigeria) Obafemi Martins	4	2	0	0	4	2
10	MF	(Guatemala) Marco Pappa	3	0	0	0	3	0
12	DF	(Costa Rica) Leonardo Gonzalez	3	0	0	0	3	0
14	DF	(United States) Chad Marshall	1	0	0	0	1	0
17	DF	(United States) DeAndre Yedlin	4	0	0	0	4	0
18	DF	(Mali) Djimi Traore	1	1	0	0	1	1
19	FW	(United States) Chad Barrett	2	0	0	0	2	0
24	GK	(Switzerland) Stefan Frei	1	0	0	0	1	0
27	MF	(United States) Lamar Neagle	3	0	1	0	4	0
33	FW	(United States) Kenny Cooper	1	0	0	0	1	0
42	MF	(Uganda) Micheal Azira	2	0	0	0	2	0
20	MF	(United States) Zach Scott	5	0	1	0	6	0
Total			53	3	4	0	57	3

==== Additional suspensions ====
Clint Dempsey was suspended for two matches by the MLS Disciplinary Committee for "violent conduct" during the home match against Toronto FC on March 15, 2014. He was eligible to return for the away match against Portland Timbers on April 5, 2014.

== Transfers ==
For transfers in, dates listed are when Sounders FC officially signed the players to the roster. Transactions where only the rights to the players are acquired are not listed. For transfers out, dates listed are when Sounders FC officially removed the players from its roster, not when they signed with another club. If a player later signed with another club, his new club will be noted, but the date listed here remains the one when he was officially removed from Sounders FC roster.

=== In ===
No.	Pos.	Player	Transferred from	Fee/notes	Date	Source
24	GK	(Switzerland) Stefan Frei	(Canada) Toronto FC	Traded for 2015 MLS SuperDraft conditional first round pick	December 10, 2013	
14	DF	(United States) Chad Marshall	(United States) Columbus Crew	Traded for allocation money and 2015 MLS SuperDraft third round pick	December 12, 2013	
	GK	(United States) Steve Clark	(Norway) Hønefoss BK	Free transfer	December 16, 2013	
33	FW	(United States) Kenny Cooper	(United States) FC Dallas	Traded for Adam Moffat	December 19, 2013	
11	DF	(United States) Aaron Kovar	(United States) Stanford Cardinal	Signed a HGP contract	January 9, 2014	
13	MF	(United States) Sean Okoli	(United States) Wake Forest Demon Deacons	Signed a HGP contract	January 9, 2014	
19	FW	(United States) Chad Barrett	(United States) New England Revolution	Selected in Stage Two of MLS Re-Entry Process	January 9, 2014	
7	FW	(United States) Tristan Bowen	(United States) Chivas USA	Traded for Mauro Rosales	January 15, 2014	
4	DF	(United States) Jalil Anibaba	(United States) Chicago Fire	Traded for Patrick Ianni, Jhon Kennedy Hurtado, and the 13th overall selection of the 2014 MLS SuperDraft	January 15, 2014	
31	DF	(Jamaica) Damion Lowe	(United States) Hartford Hawks	Selected in the first round of the 2014 MLS SuperDraft	January 16, 2014	
10	MF	(Guatemala) Marco Pappa	(Netherlands) SC Heerenveen	acquired through MLS Allocation Ranking rules	February 18, 2014	
	DF	(United States) Jimmy Ockford	(United States) Louisville Cardinals	Selected in the second round of the 2014 MLS SuperDraft	February 26, 2014	
8	MF	(Mexico) Gonzalo Pineda	(Mexico) C.D. Guadalajara	Free transfer	March 5, 2014	
21	MF	(Brazil) Fabio Pereira	(United States) Michigan Wolverines	Selected in the third round of the 2014 MLS SuperDraft	March 6, 2014	
42	MF	(Uganda) Micheal Azira	(United States) Charleston Battery	Free transfer	March 6, 2014	
23	FW	(United States) Cam Weaver	(United States) Houston Dynamo	Free transfer	March 12, 2014	
77	FW	(Martinique) Kévin Parsemain	(Martinique) Riviere-Pilote	Free transfer	March 28, 2014	
25	MF	(United States) Aaron Long	(United States) Portland Timbers	Free transfer	July 18, 2014	
	DF	(Nigeria) Onyekachi Apam	(France) Stade Rennais F.C.	Free transfer	September 15, 2014	

=== Out ===
No.	Pos.	Player	Transferred to	Fee/notes	Date	Source
	GK	(Austria) Michael Gspurning	(Greece) PAOK	Club declined contract option	December 9, 2013	
	MF	(United States) Blair Gavin	(United States) Atlanta Silverbacks	Club declined contract option	December 9, 2013	
	MID	(Democratic Republic of the Congo) Steve Zakuani	(United States) Portland Timbers	Out of contract; selected No. 2 in 2014 MLS Re-Entry Draft	December 9, 2013	
	DF	(United States) Marc Burch	(United States) Colorado Rapids	Club declined contract option; selected in 2014 MLS Re-Entry Draft	December 9, 2013	
	MID	(Argentina) Mauro Rosales	(United States) Chivas USA	Rights traded for the rights to Tristan Bowen and No. 2 in allocation ranking	December 11, 2013	
	MF	(Scotland) Adam Moffat	(United States) FC Dallas	Traded for the rights to Kenny Cooper	December 13, 2013	
	GK	(United States) Steve Clark	(United States) Columbus Crew	Traded for 2015 MLS SuperDraft fourth round pick	December 16, 2013	
	FW	(United States) Eddie Johnson	(United States) D.C. United	Traded for allocation money	December 17, 2013	
	DF	(United States) Patrick Ianni	(United States) Chicago Fire	Traded for Jalil Anibaba	January 14, 2014	
	DF	(Colombia) Jhon Kennedy Hurtado	(United States) Chicago Fire	Traded for Jalil Anibaba	January 14, 2014	
	FW	(Colombia) Fredy Montero	(Portugal) Sporting CP	Transferred after a season long loan	January 30, 2014	
	MF	(Denmark) Philip Lund	(United States) Oklahoma City Energy FC		February 14, 2014	
	FW	(United States) Will Bates		Waived	February 19, 2014	
	MF	(United States) Alex Caskey	(United States) D.C. United	Traded for 2016 MLS SuperDraft third round pick	March 4, 2014	
	MF	(Grenada) Shalrie Joseph		Club bought out contract	March 8, 2014	
	MF	(Brazil) Fábio Periera		Waived	July 23, 2014	
	FW	(United States) David Estrada	(United States) D.C. United	Traded for 2017 MLS SuperDraft third round pick	August 7, 2014	

There were many departures of contributing players during Seattle Sounders FC's 2013-2014 off-season. Most notably, on December 17, 2013, Sounders traded forward Eddie Johnson to D.C. United for allocation money. Other notable off-season departures included midfielders Mauro Rosales (traded to Chivas USA for Tristan Bowen and the second Allocation Ranking for the 2014 season), Steve Zakuani (selected in Re-Entry Draft by Portland Timbers FC), Adam Moffat (traded to FC Dallas in exchange for Kenny Cooper), defenders Marc Burch (selected in Re-Entry Draft by Colorado Rapids), Patrick Ianni and Jhon Kennedy Hurtado (traded to Chicago Fire), and goalkeeper Michael Gspurning (declined contract option).

Less significant departures included Philip Lund and Blair Gavin.

=== Loan out ===
No.	Pos.	Player	Loaned to	Fee/notes	Source
2	MF	(United States) Clint Dempsey	(England) Fulham	Two-month loan (January 1 to March 1, 2014)	
	DF	(United States) Jimmy Ockford	(United States) New York Cosmos	Season-long loan	
22	FW/DF	(United States) Eriq Zavaleta	(United States) Chivas USA	Season-long loan	
16	MF/FW	(United States) David Estrada	(United States) Atlanta Silverbacks	Loaned out (length unspecified) on April 3, 2014; Recalled on April 27, 2014	
29	GK	(United States) Josh Ford	(United States) OC Blues	Loaned out (length unspecified) on May 13, 2014	

== Recognition ==
MLS Player of the Week

Week	Player	Opponent	Link
5	(United States) Clint Dempsey	Portland Timbers	Player of the Week
6	(United States) Clint Dempsey	FC Dallas	Player of the Week
24	(Nigeria) Obafemi Martins	Portland Timbers	Player of the Week
34	(Guatemala) Marco Pappa	Los Angeles Galaxy	

MLS Player of the Month

Month	Player	Link
April	(United States) Clint Dempsey	April
September	(Nigeria) Obafemi Martins	

MLS Goal of the Week

Week	Player	Opponent	Link
6	(United States) Clint Dempsey	FC Dallas	Goal Week 6
7	(Nigeria) Obafemi Martins	Chivas USA	Goal Week 7
8	(Nigeria) Obafemi Martins	Colorado Rapids	Goal Week 8
11	(Nigeria) Obafemi Martins	San Jose Earthquakes	Goal Week 11
24	(Nigeria) Obafemi Martins	Portland Timbers	Goal Week 24
25	(United States) Clint Dempsey	Colorado Rapids	Goal Week 25
27	(United States) Lamar Neagle	Real Salt Lake	
29	(Nigeria) Obafemi Martins	Chivas USA	
30	(Guatemala) Marco Pappa	Colorado Rapids	

== Kits ==
Home	Home Alt.	Home Alt. 2	Away	Third

Type	Shirt	Shorts	Socks	First appearance / Info
Home	Rave Green	Blue	Rave Green	
Home Alt.	Rave Green	Rave Green	Blue	MLS, April 13 against Dallas
Home Alt. 2	Rave Green	Rave Green	Rave Green	MLS, May 11 against New England
Away	Shale	Shale	Shale	
Third	Black	Light green	Light green	
