= 2014 MLS Cup playoffs =

2014 edition of the MLS playoffs

Tournament details
- Country: United States; Canada
- Teams: 10

Final positions
- Champions: LA Galaxy (5th title)
- Runners-up: New England Revolution
- Semifinalists: New York Red Bulls; Seattle Sounders FC

Tournament statistics
- Matches played: 15
- Goals scored: 42 (2.8 per match)
- Attendance: 354,455 (23,630 per match)
- Top goal scorer(s): (United States) Charlie Davies (England) Bradley Wright-Phillips (4 goals each)

The 2014 MLS Cup playoffs (branded as the 2014 MLS Cup Playoffs presented by AT&T for sponsorship reasons) was the nineteenth post-season tournament culminating the Major League Soccer regular season. The tournament began in late October and culminated on December 7, 2014 with MLS Cup 2014, the nineteenth league championship for MLS.

The 2014 playoffs was the first time that the away goals rule was applied to the home-and-away, aggregate-goal series. The first series impacted by the rule was a Western Conference semifinal that saw Seattle Sounders FC advance past FC Dallas when the first match (held in Dallas) ended 1–1 and the second (held in Seattle) ended 0–0.

The LA Galaxy defeated the New England Revolution 2–1 after extra time in MLS Cup to win a record-breaking fifth title, thus earning a spot in the 2015–16 CONCACAF Champions League.

Sporting Kansas City were the defending champions, but they were eliminated in the knockout round by the New York Red Bulls.

== Format ==
The top five teams from both the Western Conference and the Eastern Conference qualified and were seeded in the playoffs to determine conference champions. The two conference champions faced off in MLS Cup 2014.

The fourth and fifth seeds in each conference played a single match hosted by the fourth seed, with the winner advancing to the conference semifinals.

In the conference semifinals, the team with the best record in each conference played the winner of their conference knockout round match, while the second and third-seeded teams in each conference played one another. The winners of the conference semifinals advanced to their respective conference finals.

In these two rounds, all matches were played in a home-and-away aggregate-goal format, with the higher-seeded team hosting the second leg. The first leg lasted the usual 90 minutes and could end in a tie. In the second leg, if the two teams were tied after 90 minutes (180 minutes total) then the team that scored more goals away from home advanced to the next round.

If there was still a tie after the away goals rule was applied, an additional 30-minute extra time period (divided into two 15-minute halves) was played, followed by a penalty shoot-out if necessary. The away goals rule did not apply to goals scored in extra time.

The two conference champions faced each other in MLS Cup, a single match hosted by the team with the better regular season record.

== Qualified teams ==
Qualification for the 2014 MLS Cup playoffs was based on the results of the 2014 regular season. The five teams from each conference with the highest point totals were seeded into their conference playoff bracket.

The 2014 regular season ran from March 8, 2014 to October 26, 2014. Teams played 34 games total, 17 at home and 17 away and were awarded three points for a win, one point for a tie (draw), and zero points for a loss. When two or more teams have the same point totals, the following tiebreak rules were applied:

1. Total number of wins
2. Goal differential
3. Goals scored
4. Fewest disciplinary points in the official points table
5. Away goal differential
6. Away goals scored
7. Home goal differential
8. Home goals scored
9. Coin toss (two clubs) or drawing of lots (three or more)

=== Eastern Conference ===
Pos	Team	Pld	W	L	T	GF	GA	GD	Pts	Qualification
1	D.C. United	34	17	9	8	52	37	+15	59	Qualification for the conference semifinals
2	New England Revolution	34	17	13	4	51	37	+14	55	Qualification for the conference semifinals
3	Columbus Crew SC	34	14	10	10	52	42	+10	52	Qualification for the conference semifinals
4	New York Red Bulls	34	13	10	11	55	50	+5	50	Qualification for the knockout round
5	Sporting Kansas City	34	14	13	7	48	41	+7	49	Qualification for the knockout round
6	Philadelphia Union	34	10	12	12	51	51	0	42	
7	Toronto FC	34	11	15	8	44	54	−10	41	
8	Houston Dynamo	34	11	17	6	39	58	−19	39	
9	Chicago Fire	34	6	10	18	41	51	−10	36	
10	Montreal Impact	34	6	18	10	38	58	−20	28	

Source: MLS

=== Western Conference ===
Pos	Team	Pld	W	L	T	GF	GA	GD	Pts	Qualification
1	Seattle Sounders FC	34	20	10	4	65	50	+15	64	Qualification for the conference semifinals
2	LA Galaxy	34	17	7	10	69	37	+32	61	Qualification for the conference semifinals
3	Real Salt Lake	34	15	8	11	54	39	+15	56	Qualification for the conference semifinals
4	FC Dallas	34	16	12	6	55	45	+10	54	Qualification for the knockout round
5	Vancouver Whitecaps FC	34	12	8	14	42	40	+2	50	Qualification for the knockout round
6	Portland Timbers	34	12	9	13	61	52	+9	49	
7	Chivas USA	34	9	19	6	29	61	−32	33	
8	Colorado Rapids	34	8	18	8	43	62	−19	32	
9	San Jose Earthquakes	34	6	16	12	35	50	−15	30	

Source: MLS

== Bracket ==
Knockout round
E4	New York Red Bulls	2
E5	Sporting Kansas City	1
W4	FC Dallas	2
W5	Vancouver Whitecaps FC	1

Conference semifinals
E1	D.C. United	0	2	2
E4	New York Red Bulls	2	1	3
Eastern Conference
E2	New England Revolution	4	3	7
E3	Columbus Crew	2	1	3
W1	Seattle Sounders FC (a)	1	0	1
W4	FC Dallas	1	0	1
Western Conference
W2	LA Galaxy	0	5	5
W3	Real Salt Lake	0	0	0

Conference finals
E4	New York Red Bulls	1	2	3
E2	New England Revolution	2	2	4
W1	Seattle Sounders FC	0	2	2
W2	LA Galaxy (a)	1	1	2

MLS Cup
E2	New England Revolution	1
W2	LA Galaxy (a.e.t.)	2

== Knockout round ==
=== Eastern Conference ===
October 30
8:00 pm EDT

New York Red Bulls	2–1	Sporting Kansas City
Wright-Phillips 77', 90'	Report	Dwyer 53'

Red Bull Arena, Harrison, New Jersey
Attendance: 15,518
Referee: Armando Villarreal

=== Western Conference ===
October 29
8:00 pm CDT

FC Dallas	2–1	Vancouver Whitecaps FC
Akindele 40'; Michel 84' (pen.)	Report	Hurtado 64'

Toyota Stadium, Frisco, Texas
Attendance: 10,279
Referee: Mark Geiger

== Conference semifinals ==
=== Eastern Conference ===
November 1
4:00 pm EDT

Columbus Crew	2–4	New England Revolution
Meram 64'; Higuaín 90+4' (pen.)	Report	Davies 34', 78'; Tierney 51'; Nguyen 70'

Columbus Crew Stadium, Columbus, Ohio
Attendance: 9,040
Referee: Drew Fischer
November 9
5:00 pm EST

New England Revolution	3–1	Columbus Crew
Nguyen 43'; Gonçalves 55'; Bunbury 77'	Report	Tchani 69'

Gillette Stadium, Foxborough, Massachusetts
Attendance: 20,184
Referee: Armando Villarreal

New England Revolution won 7–3 on aggregate.

November 2
4:00 pm EST

New York Red Bulls	2–0	D.C. United
Wright-Phillips 40'; Luyindula 73'	Report

Red Bull Arena, Harrison, New Jersey
Attendance: 18,054
Referee: Hilario Grajeda
November 8
2:30 pm EST

D.C. United	2–1	New York Red Bulls
DeLeon 37'; Franklin 90+1'	Report	Luyindula 57'

RFK Stadium, Washington, D.C.
Attendance: 20,187
Referee: Ismail Elfath

New York Red Bulls won 3–2 on aggregate.

=== Western Conference ===
November 1
6:00 pm MDT

Real Salt Lake	0–0	LA Galaxy
	Report

Rio Tinto Stadium, Sandy, Utah
Attendance: 20,713
Referee: Silviu Petrescu
November 9
4:30 pm PST

LA Galaxy	5–0	Real Salt Lake
Donovan 10', 54', 72'; Keane 20'; Sarvas 63'	Report

StubHub Center, Carson, California
Attendance: 27,000
Referee: Jair Marrufo

LA Galaxy won 5–0 on aggregate.

November 2
8:00 pm CST

FC Dallas	1–1	Seattle Sounders FC
Michel 34' (pen.)	Report	Alonso 54'

Toyota Stadium, Frisco, Texas
Attendance: 16,112
Referee: Allen Chapman
November 10
7:30 pm PST

Seattle Sounders FC	0–0	FC Dallas
	Report

CenturyLink Field, Seattle, Washington
Attendance: 38,912
Referee: Baldomero Toledo

1–1 on aggregate. Seattle Sounders FC won on away goals.

== Conference finals ==
=== Eastern Conference ===
November 23
2:00 pm EST

New York Red Bulls	1–2	New England Revolution
Wright-Phillips 27'	Report	Bunbury 17'; Jones 85'

Red Bull Arena, Harrison, New Jersey
Attendance: 25,000
Referee: Allen Chapman
November 29
3:00 pm EST

New England Revolution	2–2	New York Red Bulls
Davies 41', 70'	Report	Cahill 26'; Luyindula 52'

Gillette Stadium, Foxborough, Massachusetts
Attendance: 32,698
Referee: Baldomero Toledo

New England Revolution won 4–3 on aggregate.

=== Western Conference ===
November 23
2:00 pm PST

LA Galaxy	1–0	Seattle Sounders FC
Sarvas 52'	Report

StubHub Center, Carson, California
Attendance: 27,000
Referee: Kevin Stott
November 30
6:20 pm PST

Seattle Sounders FC	2–1	LA Galaxy
Evans 26'; Dempsey 32'	Report	Juninho 54'

CenturyLink Field, Seattle, Washington
Attendance: 46,758
Referee: Jair Marrufo

2–2 on aggregate. LA Galaxy won on away goals.

== MLS Cup 2014 ==
December 7, 2014
12:26 p.m. PST

LA Galaxy	2–1 (a.e.t.)	New England Revolution
Zardes 52'; Keane 111'	Report	Tierney 79'

StubHub Center, Carson, California
Attendance: 27,000
Referee: Mark Geiger

== Top goalscorers ==
Rank	Player	Club	Goals
1	(United States) Charlie Davies	New England Revolution	4
1	(England) Bradley Wright-Phillips	New York Red Bulls	4
3	(United States) Landon Donovan	LA Galaxy	3
3	(France) Peguy Luyindula	New York Red Bulls	3
5	(United States) Teal Bunbury	New England Revolution	2
5	(Republic of Ireland) Robbie Keane	LA Galaxy	2
5	(Brazil) Michel	FC Dallas	2
5	(United States) Lee Nguyen	New England Revolution	2
5	(Brazil) Marcelo Sarvas	LA Galaxy	2
5	(United States) Chris Tierney	New England Revolution	2

== See also ==
- 2014 in American soccer
- 2014 U.S. Open Cup
