= 2014 La Manga Women Tournament =

Tournament details
- Host country: Spain
- Dates: February 24 – March 6
- Teams: 6 (from 3 confederations)
- Venue(s): 1 (in 1 host city)

The 2014 La Manga Women Tournament was an exhibition international football (soccer) tournament held in February and March 2014. All matches were played in La Manga Stadium in La Manga Club, Spain.

== Teams ==
- Japan
- United States
- Norway
- Germany
- England
- Sweden

== Standings ==
Pl	Team	Pld	W	D	L	GF	GA	GD	Pts
1	United States	3	3	0	0	5	2	+3	9
2	Germany	3	2	1	0	9	6	+3	6
3	Japan	3	2	0	1	6	2	+4	6
4	Sweden	3	0	2	1	4	5	-1	2
5	England	3	0	1	2	3	9	-6	1
6	Norway	3	0	0	3	4	7	-3	0

== Matches ==
1 March 2014
13:00 (CET)

Japan	0–1	United States
	Report	Kealia Ohai 56'

La Manga Stadium, Murcia, Spain
Referee: Marte Soro (Norway)
1 March 2014
16:00 (CET)

Norway	2–3	Germany
Victoria Ludvigsen 22'; Andrine Hegerberg 78'		Pauline Bremer 53'; Lena Petermann 66', 90'

La Manga Stadium, Murcia, Spain
1 March 2014
19:00 (CET)

England	1–1	Sweden
Nikita Parris 76'		Elin Bragnum 90+1'

La Manga Stadium, Murcia, Spain

3 March 2014
14:00 (CET)

Japan	2–1	Norway
Chiaki Shimada 53'; Chinatsu Kira 54'	Report	? 19' (o.g.)

La Manga Stadium, Murcia, Spain
Attendance: 50
3 March 2014
17:00 (CET)

England	2–4	Germany
Drew Spence 36'; Fran Kirby 71'		Pauline Bremer 22'; Rebecca Knaak 25'; Annabel Jäger 54'; Lina Magull 56'

La Manga Stadium, Murcia, Spain
3 March 2014
20:00 (CET)

United States	2–1	Sweden
Chioma Ubogagu 16'; Frances Silva 31'	Report	Irma Helin 61' (pen.)

La Manga Stadium, Murcia, Spain
Referee: Briet Bragadottir (Iceland)

5 March 2014
14:00 (CET)

Norway	1–2	United States
	[Report]

La Manga Stadium, Murcia, Spain
5 March 2014
17:00 (CET)

Japan	4–0	England
	[Report]

La Manga Stadium, Murcia, Spain
5 March 2014
17:00 (CET)

Sweden	2–2	Germany
	[Report]

La Manga Stadium, Murcia, Spain
