= Dennis Flores (soccer) =

American soccer player

Personal information
- Full name: Dennis Flores Cortés
- Date of birth: September 23, 1993 (age 33)
- Place of birth: Pasadena, California, U.S.
- Height: 5 ft 7 in (1.70 m)
- Position: Midfielder

Team information
- Current team: Cal FC
- Number: 10

Youth career
- 2009–2011: Arsenal FC (California)
- 2011–2013: Alianza De Futbol Hispano

Senior career*
Years	Team	Apps	(Gls)
2013	León	2	(0)
2018	FC Golden State Force	8	(2)
2019–	Cal FC	0	(0)

International career^{‡}
2014	United States U23	1	(1)
- * Club domestic league appearances and goals as of July 5, 2015 ‡ National team caps and goals as of July 5, 2015

Dennis Flores Cortés (born September 23, 1993) is an American soccer player who currently plays for Cal FC.

== Early life ==
Flores was born in Pasadena, California. He is an American of Mexican descent.

== Career ==
Playing for local clubs in California including U.S. Soccer Development Academy member Arsenal FC, Flores was encouraged to try out with Alianza de Futbol Hispano, an organization that gears to develop Hispanic soccer at the amateur level. Through Alianza de Futbol Hispano, Flores was able to display his game to scouts from various Mexican clubs. After impressing on a two-week trial with Club León of Liga MX, Flores signed a professional contract.

=== Professional ===
Flores made his professional league debut with León on March 8, 2014, as a substitute against Veracruz.

In 2018, he played with PDL club FC Golden State Force.

=== International ===
In August 2014, he debuted for the United States U23 against the Bahamas senior team, scoring one goal in a 5–1 victory.

Flores earned his first callup to the United States national team in January 2015.
