= 2014 Nordic Under-17 Football Championship =

- The official logo of the tournament

Tournament details
- Host country: Denmark
- Dates: 28 July – 2 August
- Teams: 8
- Venue(s): 3 (in 2 host cities)

Final positions
- Champions: Sweden (5th title)
- Runners-up: Norway

Tournament statistics
- Matches played: 16
- Goals scored: 42 (2.63 per match)

The 2014 Nordic Under-17 Football Championship is the 37th edition of the Nordic Under-17 Football Championship, an annual football competition between men's under-17 national teams organised by the football federations of the Nordic countries. The 2014 tournament was hosted by Denmark, from 28 July to 2 August 2014.

== Teams ==
Participating teams came from the Nordic nations of Denmark, Faroe Islands, Finland, Iceland, Norway and Sweden, as well as the 10 times winners England and the United States. Each nation sent an 18-man squad composed of players born on or after 1 January 1998.

== Venues ==
- Nørre Aaby Stadion, Nørre Aaby
- Kolding Stadion, Kolding
- Mosevej Stadion, Kolding

== Group stage ==
All times are in CEST (UTC+02) .

Key to colours in group tables
Group winners progress to the final
Other teams progress to various placement matches

If a group stage game ends in a draw a penalty shoot out is held to determine final position in the group if the two teams then finish level on points and goal difference

=== Group A ===
Team	Pld	W	D	L	GF	GA	GD	Pts
Norway	3	2	1	0	7	2	+5	7
Denmark	3	2	1	0	4	0	+4	7
United States	3	1	0	2	5	7	−2	3
Faroe Islands	3	0	0	3	1	9	−8	0

28 July 2014
15:00

Faroe Islands	1–3	Norway
Jacobsen 41'	Report	Berge 5', 50'; Risa 71'

Mosevej Stadion
Attendance: 176
Referee: James Adcock (England)
28 July 2014
18:00

Denmark	2–0	United States
Schultz 4'; Ramkilde 28'	Report

Mosevej Stadion
Attendance: 871
Referee: Nermin Cisic (Sweden)

29 July 2014
15:00

United States	1–4	Norway
Rice 45'	Report	Sæter 8', 79'; Itamba 19', 60'

Nørre Aaby Stadion
Attendance: 152
Referee: Petri Viljanen (Finland)
29 July 2014
18:00

Denmark	2–0	Faroe Islands
Curovic 9'; Røjkjær 40'	Report

Nørre Aaby Stadion
Attendance: 679
Referee: Ívar Orri Kristjánsson (Iceland)

31 July 2014
15:00

Norway	0–0	Denmark
	Report

Kolding Stadion
Attendance: 624
Referee: Marcos DeOliveira (United States)
31 July 2014
15:00

Faroe Islands	0–4	United States
	Report	Koreniuk 4'; Niclasen 14' (o.g.); Gaines 21'; Matzelevich 80'

Mosevej Stadion
Attendance: 137
Referee: Petri Viljanen (Finland)

=== Group B ===
Team	Pld	W	D	L	GF	GA	GD	Pts
Sweden	3	3	0	0	5	0	+5	9
England	3	1	1	1	6	5	+1	4
Finland	3	0	2	1	1	2	−1	2
Iceland	3	0	1	2	1	6	−5	1

28 July 2014
15:00

Finland	0–1	Sweden
	Report	Ingelsson 79'

Nørre Aaby Stadion
Attendance: 210
Referee: Kari á Høvdanum (Faroe Islands)
28 July 2014
18:00

England	5–1	Iceland
Dhanda 25', 54'; Muskwe 37'; Edwards 44', 50'	Report	Hilmarsson 69'

Nørre Åby Stadion
Attendance: 209
Referee: Peter K. Andersen (Denmark)

29 July 2014
15:00

Finland	1–1	England
Lingman 29'	Report	Cantwell 35'
Penalties
Kairinen (penalty scored); Jama (penalty scored); Ceesay (penalty scored); Lahikainen (penalty scored); Jalkanen (penalty scored)	5–3	(penalty scored) Edwards; (penalty missed) Kane; (penalty scored) Arnold; (penalty scored) Francis

Kolding Stadion
Attendance: 215
Referee: Marcos DeOliveira (United States)
29 July 2014
18:00

Sweden	1–0	Iceland
Naib 58'	Report

Kolding Stadion
Attendance: 204
Referee: Kristoffer Hagenes (Norway)

31 July 2014
18:00

Iceland	0–0	Finland
	Report

Kolding Stadion
Attendance: 134
Referee: Kari á Høvdanum (Faroe Islands)
31 July 2014
18:00

England	0–3	Sweden
	Report	Kamana 2', 13'; Redzic 55'

Mosevej Stadion
Attendance: 340
Referee: Peter K. Andersen (Denmark)

== Play-off stage ==
=== 7th place play-off ===
2 August 2014
12:00

Faroe Islands	0–2	Iceland
	Report	Agnarsson 6'; Hilmarsson 70'

Kolding Stadion, Kolding
Attendance: 102
Referee: Kristoffer Hagenes (Norway)

=== 5th place play-off ===
2 August 2014
12:00

United States	3–4	Finland
Panchot 56'; Rice 60'; Braima 70'	Report	Sherrif Jr 13'; Lahikainen 18'; Soisalo 31'; Källman 46'

Nørre Aaby Stadion, Nørre Aaby
Attendance: 74
Referee: Ívar Ovar Kristjánsson (Iceland)

=== 3rd place play-off ===
2 August 2014
12:00

Denmark	1–0	England
Røjkjær 68'	Report

Mosevej Stadion, Kolding
Attendance: 745
Referee: Nermin Cisic (Sweden)

=== Final ===
2 August 2014
16:00

Norway	0–2	Sweden
	Report	Faour 9'; Lidberg 62'

Kolding Stadion, Kolding
Attendance: 673
Referee: James Adcock (England)
