= Petri Viljanen =

Finnish footballer and referee (born 1987)

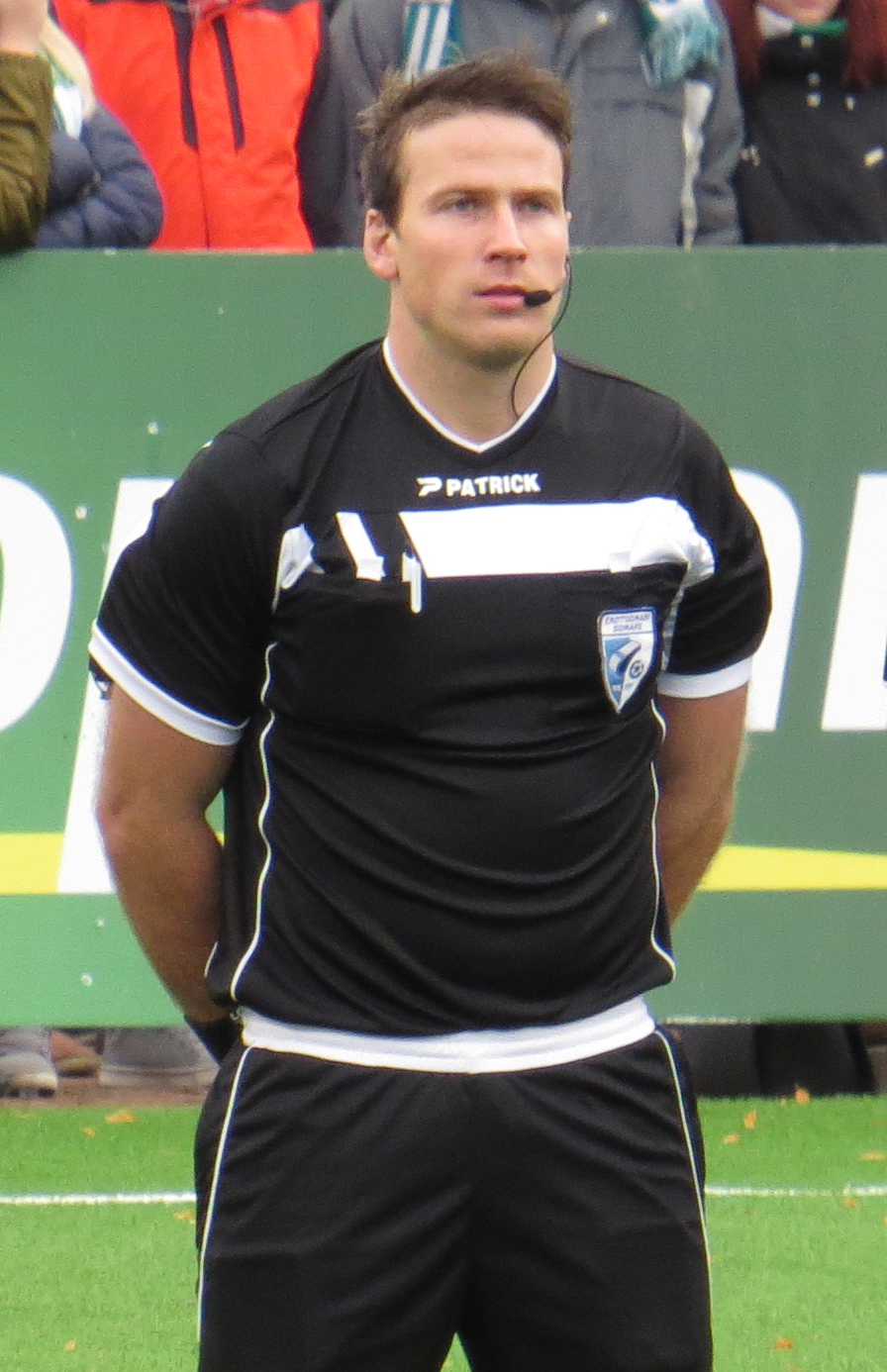

Personal information
- Date of birth: 3 February 1987 (age 39)
- Place of birth: Pori, Finland
- Height: 1.83 m (6 ft 0 in)
- Position: Defender

Youth career
- –1999: TOVE
- 2000–2004: FC Jazz

Senior career*
Years	Team	Apps	(Gls)
2005	FC PoPa	69	(0)
2006–2009	FC Haka	70	(0)
2010–2011	FC PoPa	41	(3)
2012	TOVE	3	(0)

International career
2007–2009	Finland U-21	4	(0)
- * Club domestic league appearances and goals as of 30 July 2014

Petri Viljanen is a Finnish football referee and retired football player.

== Playing career ==
He played four seasons in the Finnish top division Veikkausliiga and won the Finnish Cup with his side FC Haka in 2005. Viljanen was a member of the Finnish squad in the 2009 UEFA U-21 Championship.

== Referee ==
Viljanen made his Finnish premier division debut in June 2014 by officiating the match between FC Inter and MYPA. In July he was nominated as one of the referees of the 2014 Nordic Under-17 Football Championship in Denmark.

== Sources ==
- Guardian Football
- Veikkausliiga player statistics
