= 2014 Major League Soccer season =

19th season of Major League Soccer

Major League Soccer
- Season: 2014
- Teams: 19
- MLS Cup: LA Galaxy (5th title)
- Supporters' Shield: Seattle Sounders FC (1st shield)
- Champions League (U.S.): LA Galaxy; Seattle Sounders FC; D.C. United; Real Salt Lake
- Champions League (Canada): Vancouver Whitecaps FC
- Matches: 323
- Goals: 924 (2.86 per match)
- Top goalscorer: Bradley Wright-Phillips (27 goals)
- Biggest home win: LA 6–0 COL (Sept. 5)
- Biggest away win: SJ 0–5 DAL (Aug. 16)
- Highest scoring: 9 goals: NY 4–5 CHI (May 11)
- Longest winning run: 5 matches: Seattle Sounders FC (Apr 12 – May 7); New England Revolution (Apr 26 – May 24); LA Galaxy (Aug 20 – Sept. 5); New England Revolution (Aug 23 – Sept. 13)
- Longest unbeaten run: 12 matches: Real Salt Lake (Mar 8 – May 24)
- Longest winless run: 13 matches: San Jose Earthquakes (Aug 2–present)
- Longest losing run: 8 matches: New England Revolution (May 31 – Jul. 26)
- Highest attendance: 64,207; POR @ SEA (July 13)
- Lowest attendance: 3,702; POR @ CHV (May 28)
- Average attendance: 19,148

Locations of teams for the 2014 Major League Soccer season
Western Conference Eastern Conference

The 2014 Major League Soccer season was the 19th season of Major League Soccer. It was also the 102nd season of FIFA-sanctioned soccer in the United States, and the 36th with a national first-division league.

The regular season began on March 8 and ended on October 26. The MLS Cup Playoffs began on October 29 and ended on December 7, when the LA Galaxy claimed their fifth league title by defeating the New England Revolution, 2–1, in MLS Cup

== Teams, stadiums, and personnel ==
=== Schedule ===
Teams played 34 games: 17 at home and 17 away. The nine Western Conference teams faced each West club three times, with the home teams reversed from the previous year. The 10 Eastern Conference teams played 7 East teams three times (home teams reversed from 2013) and two East teams twice. Eastern and Western Conference teams played each other once, with the home team reversed from previous year. 90 percent of matches were on weekends. A proposal to cut the regular season to 28 matches and allow for balanced in-conference schedules was reported in the media but not adopted.

=== Stadiums and locations ===
Chicago Fire	Chivas USA/ LA Galaxy	Colorado Rapids	Columbus Crew	D.C. United	FC Dallas
Toyota Park	StubHub Center	Dick's Sporting Goods Park	Crew Stadium	RFK Memorial Stadium	Toyota Stadium
Capacity: 20,000	Capacity: 27,000	Capacity: 18,086	Capacity: 20,145	Capacity: 19,467	Capacity: 21,193

Houston Dynamo	Montreal Impact	New England Revolution	New York Red Bulls	Philadelphia Union	Portland Timbers
BBVA Compass Stadium	Saputo Stadium (Note: The Impact's first three home games were played at the Olympic Stadium. The Impact played its first home game at Saputo Stadium on April 26, 2014, against the Philadelphia Union.)	Gillette Stadium	Red Bull Arena	PPL Park	Providence Park
Capacity: 22,000	Capacity: 20,801	Capacity: 22,385	Capacity: 25,189	Capacity: 18,500	Capacity: 20,438

Real Salt Lake	San Jose Earthquakes	Seattle Sounders FC	Sporting Kansas City	Toronto FC	Vancouver Whitecaps FC
Rio Tinto Stadium	Buck Shaw Stadium	CenturyLink Field	Sporting Park	BMO Field	BC Place
Capacity: 20,213	Capacity: 11,500	Capacity: 67,000	Capacity: 18,467	Capacity: 30,000	Capacity: 21,000

=== Personnel and sponsorship ===
- On October 29, 2013, Real Salt Lake announced a 10-year contract with LifeVantage to become their jersey sponsor effective January 1, 2014. They replaced XanGo, which had been their sponsor since the 2006 season.
- On February 10, 2014, Portland Timbers announced a partnership with Providence Health & Services to rename their stadium to Providence Park, which had been called Jeld-Wen Field since 2011.
- On February 24, 2014, D.C. United announced a multi-year jersey sponsorship with Leidos.
- On May 1, 2014, Colorado Rapids announced a multi-year jersey sponsorship with Ciao Telecom.
- On July 1, 2014, following two years without jersey sponsorship, Houston Dynamo announced a multi-year jersey sponsorship with BHP Billiton.

Note: All teams use Adidas as kit manufacturer.

Team	Head coach	Captain	Shirt sponsor
Chicago Fire	(Canada) Frank Yallop	(United States) Jeff Larentowicz	Quaker
Chivas USA	(Colombia) Wílmer Cabrera	(United States) Carlos Bocanegra	—
Colorado Rapids	(United States) Pablo Mastroeni	(United States) Drew Moor	Ciao Telecom
Columbus Crew	(United States) Gregg Berhalter	(United States) Michael Parkhurst	Barbasol
D.C. United	(United States) Ben Olsen	(United States) Bobby Boswell	Leidos
FC Dallas	(Colombia) Óscar Pareja	(United States) Matt Hedges	AdvoCare
Houston Dynamo	(United States) Dominic Kinnear	(United States) Brad Davis	BHP Billiton
LA Galaxy	(United States) Bruce Arena	(Republic of Ireland) Robbie Keane	Herbalife
Montreal Impact	(United States) Frank Klopas	(Canada) Patrice Bernier	Bank of Montreal
New England Revolution	(United States) Jay Heaps	(Portugal) José Gonçalves	UnitedHealthcare
New York Red Bulls	(United States) Mike Petke	(France) Thierry Henry	Red Bull
Philadelphia Union	(United States) Jim Curtin	(United States) Brian Carroll	Bimbo
Portland Timbers	(United States) Caleb Porter	(Canada) Will Johnson	Alaska Airlines
Real Salt Lake	(United States) Jeff Cassar	(United States) Kyle Beckerman	LifeVantage
San Jose Earthquakes	(United States) Ian Russell (Interim)	(United States) Chris Wondolowski	—
Seattle Sounders FC	(United States) Sigi Schmid	(United States) Brad Evans	Xbox
Sporting Kansas City	(United States) Peter Vermes	(United States) Matt Besler	Ivy Funds
Toronto FC	(United States) Greg Vanney	(Scotland) Steven Caldwell	Bank of Montreal
Vancouver Whitecaps FC	(Wales) Carl Robinson	(Chile) Pedro Morales	Bell Canada

=== Managerial changes ===
Team	Outgoing manager	Manner of departure	Date of vacancy	Position in table	Incoming manager	Date of appointment
FC Dallas	(United States) Schellas Hyndman	Resigned	October 26, 2013	Preseason	(Colombia) Oscar Pareja	January 10, 2014
Vancouver Whitecaps FC	(Scotland) Martin Rennie	Fired	October 29, 2013	Preseason	(Wales) Carl Robinson	December 16, 2013
Chicago Fire	(United States) Frank Klopas	Resigned	October 30, 2013	Preseason	(Canada) Frank Yallop	October 31, 2013
Columbus Crew	(United States) Brian Bliss	End of caretaker spell	November 6, 2013	Preseason	(United States) Gregg Berhalter	November 6, 2013
Chivas USA	(Mexico) José Luis Real	End of caretaker spell	November 25, 2013	Preseason	(Colombia) Wílmer Cabrera	January 9, 2014
Real Salt Lake	(United States) Jason Kreis	End of contract	December 10, 2013	Preseason	(United States) Jeff Cassar	December 18, 2013
Montreal Impact	(Switzerland) Marco Schällibaum	Fired	December 18, 2013	Preseason	(United States) Frank Klopas	December 18, 2013
Colorado Rapids	(Colombia) Oscar Pareja	Resigned	January 10, 2014	Preseason	(United States) Pablo Mastroeni	March 8, 2014
Philadelphia Union	(United States) John Hackworth	Fired	June 10, 2014	16th	(United States) Jim Curtin	June 10, 2014
Toronto FC	(New Zealand) Ryan Nelsen	Fired	August 31, 2014	7th	(United States) Greg Vanney	August 31, 2014
San Jose Earthquakes	(Canada) Mark Watson	Fired	October 15, 2014	18th	(United States) Ian Russell (interim)	October 15, 2014

=== Player transfers ===
Major League Soccer employs twelve methods to acquire players. These mechanisms are the following: (a) via allocation; (b) via the Designated Player Rule; (c) via the annual SuperDraft; (d) via trade; (e) placing a discovery claim; (f) via the Homegrown Player Rule; (g) via the annual Re-Entry Draft; (h) via the annual Waiver Draft; (i) through weighted lottery; (j) through an "extreme hardship" call-up; (k) by replacing a player who has been placed on the Season Ending Injury List; (l) by replacing a player who has been placed on the Disabled List.

==== Allocation ranking ====
The allocation ranking is the mechanism used to determine which MLS club has first priority to acquire a U.S. National Team player who signs with MLS after playing abroad, or a former MLS player who returns to the League after having gone to a club abroad for a transfer fee. The allocation rankings may also be used in the event two or more clubs file a request for the same player on the same day. The allocations will be ranked in reverse order of finish for the 2013 season, taking playoff performance into account.

Once the club uses its allocation ranking to acquire a player, it drops to the bottom of the list. A ranking can be traded, provided that part of the compensation received in return is another club's ranking. At all times, each club is assigned one ranking. The rankings reset at the end of each MLS League season.

Original Ranking	Club	Date Allocation Used	Player signed	Previous club	Ref
1	Philadelphia Union†	January 27, 2014	(United States) Maurice Edu	(England) Stoke City	
2	Seattle Sounders FC‡	January 31, 2014	(Guatemala) Marco Pappa	(Netherlands) Heerenveen	
3	Houston Dynamo∞	July 23, 2014	(United States) DaMarcus Beasley	(Mexico) Puebla	
4	Columbus Crew SC	October 7, 2014	(Sierra Leone) Kei Kamara	(England) Middlesbrough	
5	FC Dallas				
6	Los Angeles Galaxy†#				
7	Vancouver Whitecaps FC				
8	Chicago Fire				
9	San Jose Earthquakes				
10	Montreal Impact				
11	Colorado Rapids				
12	New England Revolution				
13	Chivas USA‡				
14	D.C. United#				
15	New York Red Bulls				
16	Toronto FC∞				
17	Portland Timbers				
18	Real Salt Lake				
19	Sporting Kansas City				

^{† On January 14, 2014, Philadelphia Union acquired the No. 1 ranking and Ethan White from D.C. United in exchange for the No. 6 allocation ranking and Jeff Parke.}

^{‡ On December 11, 2013, Seattle Sounders acquired the No. 2 allocation ranking from Chivas USA in exchange for the No. 13 allocation ranking and Tristan Bowen.}

^{∞ On July 23, 2014, Houston Dynamo acquired the then-no. 1 allocation ranking (original ranking number 3) and allocation money from Toronto FC in exchange for the then-no. 14 allocation ranking (original ranking number 16) and Warren Creavalle.}

^{# On July 29, 2014, Los Angeles Galaxy acquired the then-No. 3 allocation ranking (original ranking number 6) from D.C. United in exchange for the then-No. 11 allocation ranking (original ranking number 14), a second-round selection in the 2015 MLS SuperDraft, and Kofi Opare.}

=== Ownership changes ===
Club	New owner	Previous owner	Date
Chivas USA	Major League Soccer	Jorge Vergara	February 20, 2014

=== Rule changes ===
The rules for the 2014 season are largely identical as those in 2013, with one major exception. For the first time in league history, the away goals rule will be used in two-legged MLS Cup playoff matches. MLS will use the version of the rule employed in CONCACAF competitions, which is applied only at the end of regular time of the second leg and not after extra time. MLS has also tweaked the tiebreaker rules for the league standings. The first tiebreaker remains total wins, but the second and third tiebreakers have been swapped—goal difference is now second and goals scored is third. All other tiebreakers remain the same as in 2013.

More minor changes include the following:

- The so-called "Special Discovery Signing" has been standardized. Under this provision, each team is allowed to amortize the total acquisition costs for one player, including the transfer fee, over the length of his contract without making him a Designated Player.
- Regulations for loans between MLS teams have been formalized. Each team may loan out one player per season to another league team, with the loan deal being finalized no later than the close of the primary transfer window (May 12 in 2014). The player must be no older than 24 at the time of the loan, must stay on the receiving team's roster for the entire season, and cannot play against the team that loaned him out. Deals may include an option to buy.
- Players who have trained for at least one year in a team's youth system, and have trained for at least 80 days with the team's academy in that year, may be signed to a first professional contract without being subject to the MLS SuperDraft.

The salary cap for 2014 has also been adjusted upward. The team salary cap, which as in previous years covers the first 20 of the 30 available roster spots, has increased to $3.1 million. The cap charge for a Designated Player is now $387,500, up from $368,750 last season. Midseason Designated Player signings carry a cap charge of $193,750. The minimum salaries for "off-budget" players (roster spots 21–30, including Generation adidas players) have also increased from last season.

== Regular season ==
=== Eastern Conference ===
Pos	Team	Pld	W	L	T	GF	GA	GD	Pts	Qualification
1	D.C. United	34	17	9	8	52	37	+15	59	Qualification for the conference semifinals
2	New England Revolution	34	17	13	4	51	37	+14	55	Qualification for the conference semifinals
3	Columbus Crew SC	34	14	10	10	52	42	+10	52	Qualification for the conference semifinals
4	New York Red Bulls	34	13	10	11	55	50	+5	50	Qualification for the knockout round
5	Sporting Kansas City	34	14	13	7	48	41	+7	49	Qualification for the knockout round
6	Philadelphia Union	34	10	12	12	51	51	0	42	
7	Toronto FC	34	11	15	8	44	54	−10	41	
8	Houston Dynamo	34	11	17	6	39	58	−19	39	
9	Chicago Fire	34	6	10	18	41	51	−10	36	
10	Montreal Impact	34	6	18	10	38	58	−20	28	

Source: MLS

=== Western Conference ===
Pos	Team	Pld	W	L	T	GF	GA	GD	Pts	Qualification
1	Seattle Sounders FC	34	20	10	4	65	50	+15	64	Qualification for the conference semifinals
2	LA Galaxy	34	17	7	10	69	37	+32	61	Qualification for the conference semifinals
3	Real Salt Lake	34	15	8	11	54	39	+15	56	Qualification for the conference semifinals
4	FC Dallas	34	16	12	6	55	45	+10	54	Qualification for the knockout round
5	Vancouver Whitecaps FC	34	12	8	14	42	40	+2	50	Qualification for the knockout round
6	Portland Timbers	34	12	9	13	61	52	+9	49	
7	Chivas USA	34	9	19	6	29	61	−32	33	
8	Colorado Rapids	34	8	18	8	43	62	−19	32	
9	San Jose Earthquakes	34	6	16	12	35	50	−15	30	

Source: MLS

=== Overall standings ===
Pos	Team	Pld	W	L	T	GF	GA	GD	Pts	Qualification
1	Seattle Sounders FC (S, U)	34	20	10	4	65	50	+15	64	Qualification for the CONCACAF Champions League
2	LA Galaxy (C)	34	17	7	10	69	37	+32	61	Qualification for the CONCACAF Champions League
3	D.C. United	34	17	9	8	52	37	+15	59	Qualification for the CONCACAF Champions League
4	Real Salt Lake	34	15	8	11	54	39	+15	56	Qualification for the CONCACAF Champions League
5	New England Revolution	34	17	13	4	51	46	+5	55	
6	FC Dallas	34	16	12	6	55	45	+10	54	
7	Columbus Crew	34	14	10	10	52	42	+10	52	
8	New York Red Bulls	34	13	10	11	55	50	+5	50	
9	Vancouver Whitecaps FC	34	12	8	14	42	40	+2	50	Qualification for the CONCACAF Champions League
10	Sporting Kansas City	34	14	13	7	48	41	+7	49	
11	Portland Timbers	34	12	9	13	61	52	+9	49	
12	Philadelphia Union	34	10	12	12	51	51	0	42	
13	Toronto FC	34	11	15	8	44	54	−10	41	
14	Houston Dynamo	34	11	17	6	39	58	−19	39	
15	Chicago Fire	34	6	10	18	41	51	−10	36	
16	Chivas USA	34	9	19	6	29	61	−32	33	
17	Colorado Rapids	34	8	18	8	43	62	−19	32	
18	San Jose Earthquakes	34	6	16	12	35	50	−15	30	
19	Montreal Impact (V)	34	6	18	10	38	58	−20	28	

Source: MLS
Rules for classification: 1) points; 2) head-to-head record; 3) goal difference; 4) number of goals scored
(C) MLS Cup champions; (S) Supporters' Shield winners; (U) U.S. Open Cup winners; (V) Canadian Championship winners

== MLS Cup playoffs ==
=== Bracket ===
Knockout round
E4	New York Red Bulls	2
E5	Sporting Kansas City	1
W4	FC Dallas	2
W5	Vancouver Whitecaps FC	1

Conference semifinals
E1	D.C. United	0	2	2
E4	New York Red Bulls	2	1	3
Eastern Conference
E2	New England Revolution	4	3	7
E3	Columbus Crew	2	1	3
W1	Seattle Sounders FC (a)	1	0	1
W4	FC Dallas	1	0	1
Western Conference
W2	LA Galaxy	0	5	5
W3	Real Salt Lake	0	0	0

Conference finals
E4	New York Red Bulls	1	2	3
E2	New England Revolution	2	2	4
W1	Seattle Sounders FC	0	2	2
W2	LA Galaxy (a)	1	1	2

MLS Cup
E2	New England Revolution	1
W2	LA Galaxy (a.e.t.)	2

== Player statistics ==
=== Goals ===
Rank	Player	Club	Goals
1	(England) Bradley Wright-Phillips	New York Red Bulls	27
2	(United States) Dom Dwyer	Sporting Kansas City	22
3	(Republic of Ireland) Robbie Keane	LA Galaxy	19
4	(United States) Lee Nguyen	New England Revolution	18
5	(Nigeria) Obafemi Martins	Seattle Sounders FC	17
6	(United States) Gyasi Zardes	LA Galaxy	16
7	(United States) Clint Dempsey	Seattle Sounders FC	15
7	(Mexico) Erick Torres	Chivas USA	15
9	(United States) Chris Wondolowski	San Jose Earthquakes	14
10	(Ecuador) Joao Plata	Real Salt Lake	13

=== Hat-tricks ===
Player	For	Against	Score	Date
(United States) Clint Dempsey	Seattle Sounders FC	Portland Timbers	4−4	April 5
(England) Bradley Wright-Phillips	New York Red Bulls	Houston Dynamo	4−0	April 23
(United States) Harry Shipp	Chicago Fire	New York Red Bulls	5−4	May 10
(England) Bradley Wright-Phillips	New York Red Bulls	Chicago Fire	4−5	May 10
(Argentina) Javier Morales	Real Salt Lake	Houston Dynamo	5−2	May 11
(Mexico) Luis Silva	D.C. United	Montreal Impact	4−2	June 11
(Canada) Tesho Akindele	FC Dallas	San Jose Earthquakes	5−0	August 16
(England) Bradley Wright-Phillips	New York Red Bulls	Seattle Sounders FC	4−1	September 20

=== Assists ===
Rank	Player	Club	Assists
1	(United States) Landon Donovan	LA Galaxy	19
2	(France) Thierry Henry	New York Red Bulls	14
2	(Republic of Ireland) Robbie Keane	LA Galaxy	14
2	(Argentina) Diego Valeri	Portland Timbers	14
5	(Nigeria) Obafemi Martins	Seattle Sounders FC	13
6	(Argentina) Javier Morales	Real Salt Lake	12
6	(Chile) Pedro Morales	Vancouver Whitecaps FC	12
8	(United States) Brad Davis	Houston Dynamo	11
8	(Argentina) Cristian Maidana	Philadelphia Union	11
8	(Argentina) Mauro Rosales	Vancouver Whitecaps FC	11
8	(Brazil) Marcelo Sarvas	LA Galaxy	11

=== Clean sheets ===
Rank	Player	Club	Clean sheets
1	(Denmark) David Ousted	Vancouver Whitecaps FC	13
2	(United States) Bill Hamid	D.C. United	10
3	(Switzerland) Stefan Frei	Seattle Sounders FC	9
4	(United States) Steve Clark	Columbus Crew	8
4	(Panama) Jaime Penedo	LA Galaxy	8
4	(United States) Bobby Shuttleworth	New England Revolution	8
7	(United States) Tally Hall	Houston Dynamo	7
7	(United States) Clint Irwin	Colorado Rapids	7
7	(United States) Eric Kronberg	Sporting Kansas City	7
7	(Jamaica) Donovan Ricketts	Portland Timbers	7
7	(United States) Nick Rimando	Real Salt Lake	7

== Awards ==
=== Individual awards ===
Award	Player	Club
Most Valuable Player	(Republic of Ireland) Robbie Keane	LA Galaxy
Defender of the Year	(United States) Chad Marshall	Seattle Sounders FC
Goalkeeper of the Year	(United States) Bill Hamid	D.C. United
Coach of the Year	(United States) Ben Olsen	D.C. United
Rookie of the Year	(Canada) Tesho Akindele	FC Dallas
Newcomer of the Year	(Chile) Pedro Morales	Vancouver Whitecaps FC
Comeback Player of the Year	(Costa Rica) Rodney Wallace	Portland Timbers
Golden Boot	(England) Bradley Wright-Phillips	New York Red Bulls
Fair Play Award	(United States) Michael Parkhurst	Columbus Crew
Humanitarian of the Year	(Guam) A. J. DeLaGarza	LA Galaxy
Goal of the Year	(Nigeria) Obafemi Martins	Seattle Sounders FC
Save of the Year	(United States) Luis Robles	New York Red Bulls

=== Best XI ===
Goalkeeper	Defenders	Midfielders	Forwards
(United States) Bill Hamid, D.C. United	(United States) Chad Marshall, Seattle (United States) Bobby Boswell, D.C. United (United States) Omar Gonzalez, LA Galaxy	(United States) Lee Nguyen, New England (United States) Landon Donovan, LA Galaxy (Argentina) Diego Valeri, Portland (France) Thierry Henry, Red Bulls	(Republic of Ireland) Robbie Keane, LA Galaxy (England) Bradley Wright-Phillips, Red Bulls (Nigeria) Obafemi Martins, Seattle

=== Player of the Month ===
Month
Month	Player	Club	Stats
March	(Argentina) Mauro Díaz	FC Dallas	2G, 1A
April	(United States) Clint Dempsey	Seattle Sounders FC	7G, 2A
May	(United States) Dom Dwyer	Sporting Kansas City	6G
June	(United States) Eric Kronberg	Sporting Kansas City	6SV, 0GA
July	(United States) Benny Feilhaber	Sporting Kansas City	2G, 1A
August	(United States) Landon Donovan	LA Galaxy	3G, 6A
September	(Nigeria) Obafemi Martins	Seattle Sounders FC	5G, 1A
October	(United States) Lee Nguyen	New England Revolution	5G

=== Weekly awards ===
Week	MLS Player of the Week			AT&T Goal of the Week			MLS Save of the Week		
Week	Player	Nat	Club	Player	Nat	Club	Player	Nat	Club
Week 1	Nick Rimando	USA	Real Salt Lake	Sebastián Fernández	URU	Vancouver Whitecaps FC	Nick Rimando	USA	Real Salt Lake
Week 2	Jermain Defoe	ENG	Toronto FC	Kyle Beckerman	USA	Real Salt Lake	Nick Rimando	USA	Real Salt Lake
Week 3	Bernardo Añor	VEN	Columbus Crew	Fabián Castillo	COL	FC Dallas	David Ousted	DEN	Vancouver Whitecaps FC
Week 4	Graham Zusi	USA	Sporting Kansas City	Dom Dwyer	ENG	Sporting Kansas City	Dan Kennedy	USA	Chivas USA
Week 5	Clint Dempsey	USA	Seattle Sounders FC	José Mari	ESP	Colorado Rapids	Chris Seitz	USA	FC Dallas
Week 6	Clint Dempsey	USA	Seattle Sounders FC	Clint Dempsey	USA	Seattle Sounders FC	Chris Seitz	USA	FC Dallas
Week 7	Nick Rimando	USA	Real Salt Lake	Obafemi Martins	NGA	Seattle Sounders FC	Júlio César	BRA	Toronto FC
Week 8	Bradley Wright-Phillips	ENG	New York Red Bulls	Obafemi Martins	NGA	Seattle Sounders FC	Tally Hall	USA	Houston Dynamo
Week 9	Joao Plata	ECU	Real Salt Lake	Gastón Fernández	ARG	Portland Timbers	Eric Kronberg	USA	Sporting Kansas City
Week 10	Harrison Shipp	USA	Chicago Fire	Javier Morales	ARG	Real Salt Lake	Raúl Fernández	PER	FC Dallas
Week 11	Federico Higuaín	ARG	Columbus Crew	Obafemi Martins	NGA	Seattle Sounders FC	Jeff Attinella	USA	Real Salt Lake
Week 12	Landon Donovan	USA	LA Galaxy	Erik Hurtado	USA	Vancouver Whitecaps FC	Donovan Ricketts	JAM	Portland Timbers
Week 13	Deshorn Brown	JAM	Colorado Rapids	Will Johnson	CAN	Portland Timbers	Jeff Attinella	USA	Real Salt Lake
Week 14	Fanendo Adi	NGA	Portland Timbers	Fabian Castillo	COL	FC Dallas	Dan Kennedy	USA	Chivas USA
Week 15	Luis Silva	USA	D.C. United	(not awarded)			(not awarded)		
Week 16	Jack McInerney	USA	Montreal Impact	Jack McInerney	USA	Montreal Impact	David Ousted	DEN	Vancouver Whitecaps FC
Week 17	Erick Torres	MEX	Chivas USA	Erick Torres	MEX	Chivas USA	Donovan Ricketts	JAM	Portland Timbers
Week 18	Thierry Henry	FRA	New York Red Bulls	Deshorn Brown	JAM	Colorado Rapids	Donovan Ricketts	JAM	Portland Timbers
Week 19	Benny Feilhaber	USA	Sporting Kansas City	Diego Valeri	ARG	Portland Timbers	Steve Clark	USA	Columbus Crew
Week 20	Yannick Djaló	POR	San Jose Earthquakes	Graham Zusi	USA	Sporting Kansas City	Jaime Penedo	PAN	LA Galaxy
Week 21	Robbie Keane	IRE	LA Galaxy	Dax McCarty	USA	New York Red Bulls	Nick Rimando	USA	Real Salt Lake
Week 22	Chris Schuler	USA	Real Salt Lake	Diego Valeri	ARG	Portland Timbers	Jon Kempin	USA	Sporting Kansas City
Week 23	Tesho Akindele	CAN	FC Dallas	Dillon Serna	USA	Colorado Rapids	Jon Kempin	USA	Sporting Kansas City
Week 24	Obafemi Martins	NGA	Seattle Sounders FC	Obafemi Martins	NGA	Seattle Sounders FC	Clint Irwin	USA	Colorado Rapids
Week 25	Landon Donovan	USA	LA Galaxy	Clint Dempsey	USA	Seattle Sounders FC	Nick Rimando	USA	Real Salt Lake
Week 26	Landon Donovan	USA	LA Galaxy	Thierry Henry	FRA	New York Red Bulls	Jon Busch	USA	San Jose Earthquakes
Week 27	Blas Pérez	PAN	FC Dallas	Lamar Neagle	USA	Seattle Sounders FC	Joe Bendik	USA	Toronto FC
Week 28	Bradley Wright-Phillips	ENG	New York Red Bulls	Diego Valeri	ARG	Portland Timbers	Luis Robles	USA	New York Red Bulls
Week 29	Landon Donovan	USA	LA Galaxy	Obafemi Martins	NGA	Seattle Sounders FC	Steve Clark	USA	Columbus Crew
Week 30	Sebastián Fernández	URU	Vancouver Whitecaps FC	Marco Pappa	GUA	Seattle Sounders FC	Clint Irwin	USA	Colorado Rapids
Week 31	Diego Valeri	ARG	Portland Timbers	Graham Zusi	USA	Sporting Kansas City	Andy Gruenebaun	USA	Sporting Kansas City
Week 32	Lee Nguyen	USA	New England Revolution	Lee Nguyen	USA	New England Revolution	Nick Rimando	USA	Real Salt Lake
Week 33	Marco Pappa	GUA	Seattle Sounders FC	Kyle Beckerman	USA	Real Salt Lake	Donovan Ricketts	JAM	Portland Timbers

The player of the week is voted on by North American sports journalists. All other weekly and monthly awards are decided by an online fan vote.
