= Irma Helin Zibanejad =

Swedish footballer (born 1994)

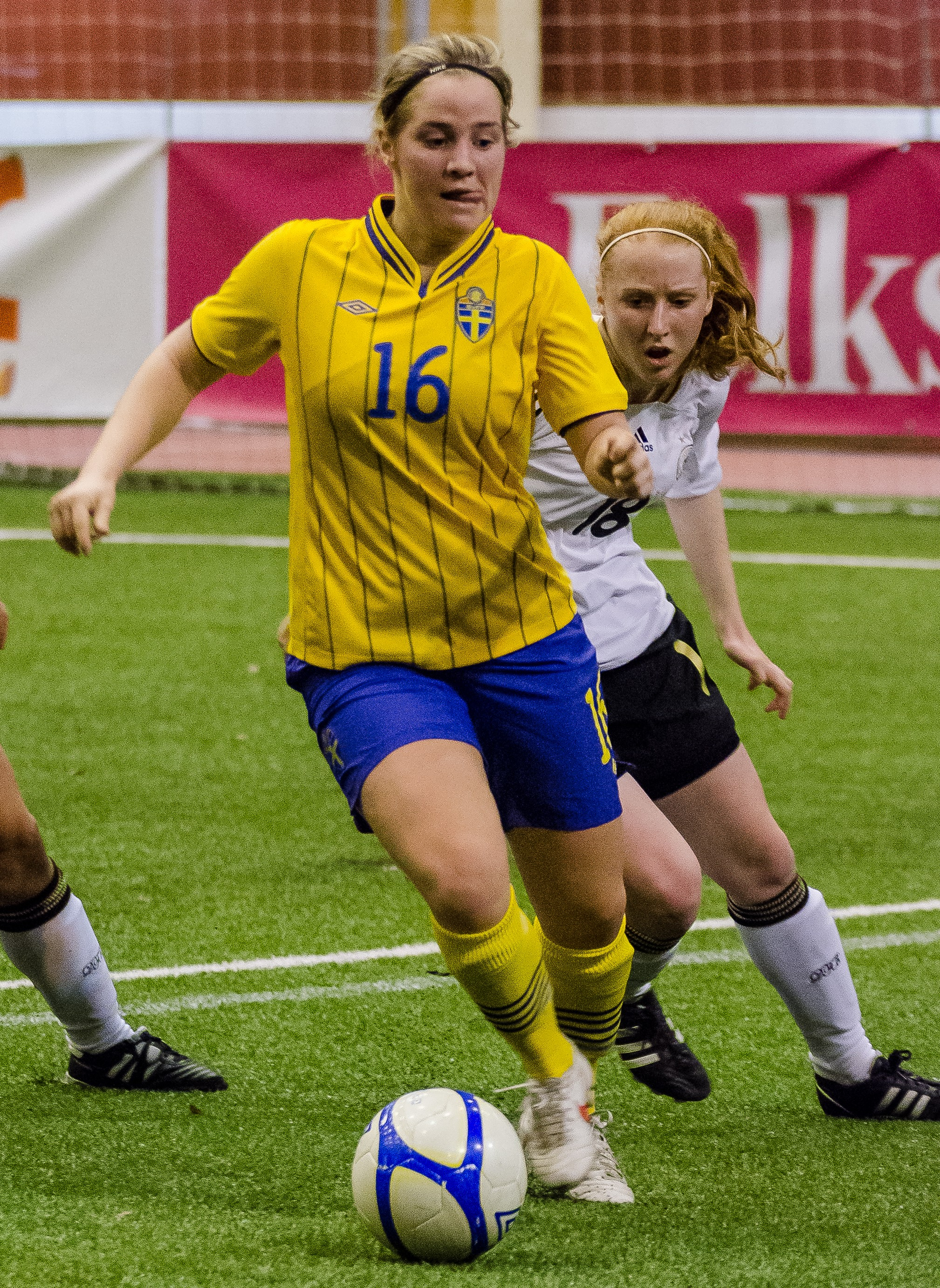
- Helin, 2012

Personal information
- Full name: Irma Lovisa Hilda Helin Zibanejad
- Date of birth: 18 June 1994 (age 32)
- Place of birth: Stockholm, Sweden
- Height: 1.64 m (5 ft 5 in)
- Position: Midfielder

Youth career
- Grödinge SK

Senior career*
Years	Team	Apps	(Gls)
2010–2014	Djurgårdens IF	82	(6)
2011	→ NiceFutis (loan)	5	(1)
2015–2016	Piteå IF	40	(3)
2017	Linköpings FC	7	(0)
2018–2019	Djurgårdens IF	42	(2)

International career^{‡}
2016	Sweden	1	(0)
- * Club domestic league appearances and goals as of 21:30, 2 February 2020 (UTC) ‡ National team caps and goals as of 21:18, 8 May 2017 (UTC)

Irma Lovisa Hilda Helin Zibanejad (née Helin; born 18 June 1994) is a Swedish former football midfielder who played for Djurgårdens IF Fotboll of the Damallsvenskan. In October 2016 she won her first cap for the Sweden women's national football team in a 7–0 win over Iran. She is married to ice hockey player Mika Zibanejad.
