= Marcelo Sarvas =

Brazilian footballer

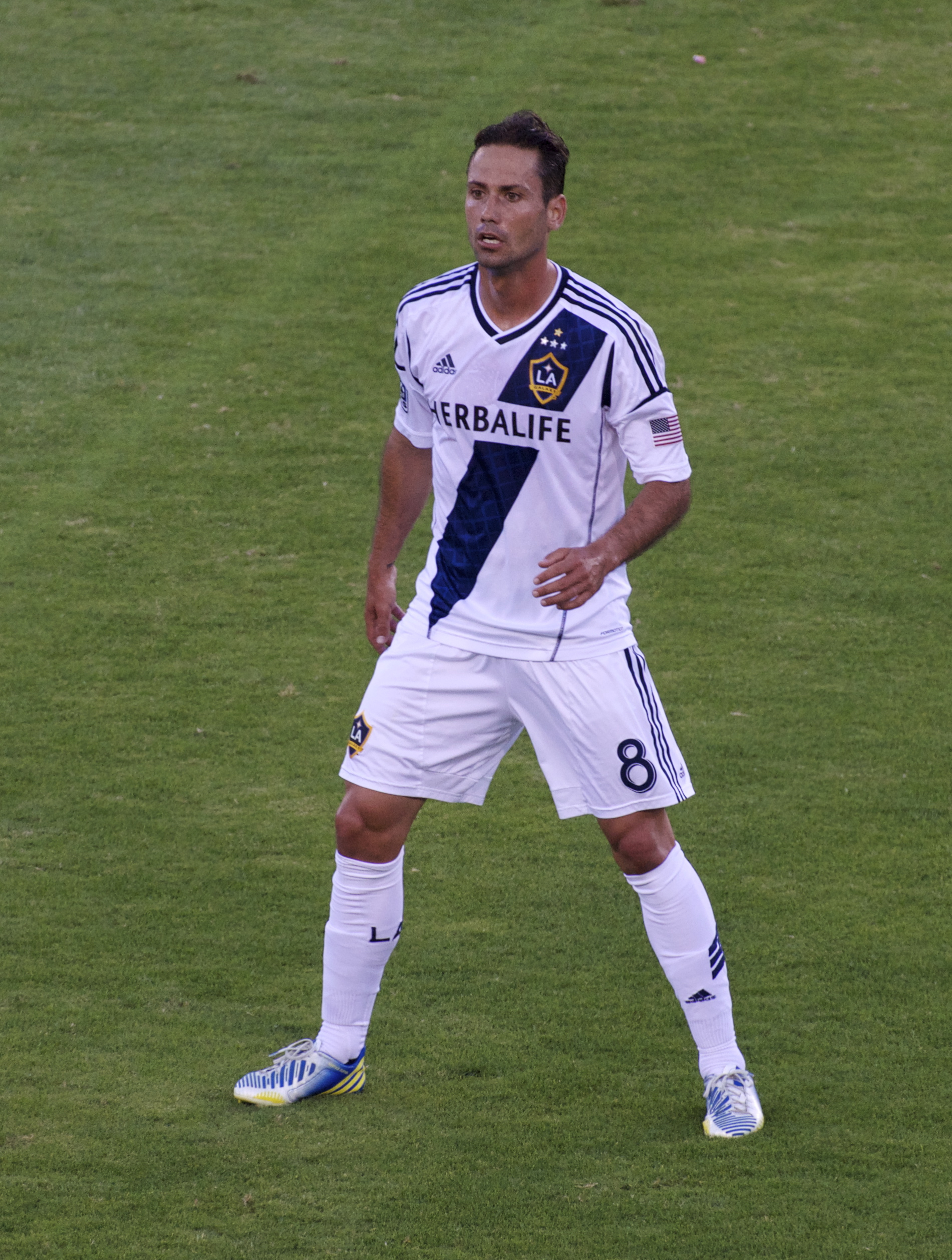
- Playing for Los Angeles Galaxy in 2013

Personal information
- Full name: Marcelo Fazzio Sarvas
- Date of birth: October 16, 1981 (age 45)
- Place of birth: São Paulo, Brazil
- Height: 1.78 m (5 ft 10 in)
- Position: Midfielder

Team information
- Current team: Empire Strykers

Youth career
- CA Ypiranga
- Corinthians

Senior career*
Years	Team	Apps	(Gls)
2002	Corinthians	1	(0)
2003	Noroeste		
2004	Karlskrona	22	(3)
2005–2006	Kristianstad	43	(26)
2007–2008	Mjällby	34	(4)
2008	Bunkeflo IF	12	(2)
2009–2010	Polonia Warsaw	28	(2)
2010–2011	Alajuelense	29	(3)
2012–2014	LA Galaxy	88	(9)
2014	→ LA Galaxy II (loan)	1	(0)
2015	Colorado Rapids	25	(2)
2016–2017	D.C. United	53	(1)
2024	Empire Strykers (arena)	0	(0)

International career
2024	United States arena	1	(0)

Managerial career
- 2022–2023: LA Galaxy II
- 2025: LD Alajuelense (assistant)
- 2026–: St. Louis City SC (assistant)
- * Club domestic league appearances and goals as of 9 January 2026

Marcelo Fazzio Sarvas (born October 16, 1981) is a Brazilian professional footballer coach and former player who is currently an assistant coach for MLS side St. Louis City SC.

== Club career ==
Marcelo Sarvas began his career with Brazil's SC Corinthians Paulista debuting for the first team during the 2002 season. In 2003 the attacking midfielder joined Esporte Clube Noroeste and remained at the club for one year before leaving for Europe.

=== Europe ===
Sarvas signed for Swedish side Karlskrona AIF and remained at the club for one season before joining Kristianstads FF. In his first season with Kristianstad Sarvas scored 10 goals and helped the club gain promotion to the Swedish football Division 1. His play did not go unnoticed by higher level Swedish clubs including Mjällby AIF who signed Sarvas for the 2007 season.

In 2008, he once again transferred to another club in Sweden Bunkeflo IF. He was a top player for Bunkeflo and caught the eye of Polish top-flight club Polonia Warszawa. He appeared in 28 league matches for Polonia Warszawa scoring 2 goals, and in 6 UEFA Europa League matches scored 2 goals.

After two years in Poland, Sarvas returned to America this time joining Costa Rica's L.D. Alajuelense. Sarvas was given the number 10 jersey and became an instrumental player for Alajuelense and helped the club proclaim itself Verano 2011 Champion. He also was a key player in the clubs CONCACAF Champions League run, attracting the interest of other top clubs in North America, including Major League Soccer Champion Los Angeles Galaxy.

=== Major League Soccer ===
On December 6, 2011, it was announced that Sarvas had signed for Los Angeles Galaxy in Major League Soccer. Sarvas stayed with Los Angeles for three seasons, winning two MLS Cup championships.

On January 15, 2015, he was traded with an international roster spot to Colorado Rapids in exchange for allocation money and the #3 ranking in the allocation ranking.

On 1 February 2016, Colorado traded Sarvas to D.C. United in exchange for targeted allocation money and a conditional 2018 MLS SuperDraft pick. He scored his only goal for D.C. United against the New York Red Bulls by a penalty kick in the 70th minute. The game ended in a 2–2 tie. He was out of contract with United following the 2017 season.

=== Arena soccer ===
In August 2024, Sarvas was called up to the United States national arena soccer team for a September friendly against Mexico.

On October 15, 2024, Sarvas signed a two-year contract with the Empire Strykers of the Major Arena Soccer League.

== Coaching career ==
As of 10 April 2020, Sarvas is listed as U-19 Coach for the Colorado Rapids Youth Development Staff.

Sarvas joined LA Galaxy's Academy coaching staff on 1 July 2020.

On 26 August 2022, Sarvas was named head coach of LA Galaxy II in the USL Championship, replacing Yoann Damet who was added to the first team staff. Sarvas had previously served as U-17 and U-19 manager in the Galaxy Academy.

== Managerial statistics ==
As of 27 September 2026

Managerial record by team and tenure
Team	Nat	From	To	Record								Ref
Team	Nat	From	To	G	W	D	L	GF	GA	GD	Win %	Ref
Ventura County FC	(United States)	26 August 2022	29 September 2023	36	11	1	24	80	118	−38	30.56	Ref

== Honours ==
Corinthians

- Copa do Brasil: 2002

L.D. Alajuelense

- Invierno: 2011
- Verano: 2011

Los Angeles Galaxy

- MLS Cup: 2012, 2014
