= All-time Chivas USA roster =

This list comprises all players who have participated in at least one league match for Chivas USA since the team's first Major League Soccer season in 2005, until its last in 2014. Players who were on the roster but never played a first team game are not listed; players who appeared for the team in other competitions (U.S. Open Cup, CONCACAF Champions League, etc.) but never actually made an MLS appearance are noted at the bottom of the page.

A "†" denotes players who only appeared in a single match.

== A ==
- (United States) Juan Agudelo
- (United States) Carlos Alvarez
- (Colombia) Juan Pablo Ángel
- (United States) Daniel Antúnez
- (United States) Esteban Arias
- (United States) Eric Avila
- (Mexico) Rafael Alanis

== B ==
- (Argentina) Leandro Barrera
- (Mexico) Adolfo Bautista
- (Mexico) Armando Begines
- (United States) Milton Blanco
- (United States) Carlos Bocanegra
- (Ecuador) Luis Bolaños
- (Ecuador) Miller Bolaños
- (United States) Carlos Borja
- (Ecuador) Félix Borja
- (United States) Jonathan Bornstein
- (United States) Tristan Bowen
- (New Zealand) Andrew Boyens
- (United States) Justin Braun
- (United States) Bobby Burling
- (United States) Preston Burpo

== C ==
- (United States) Danny Califf
- (Uruguay) Paolo Cardozo
- (Mexico) Giovani Casillas
- (Honduras) Marvin Chávez
- (United States) Chukwudi Chijindu
- (United States) Kraig Chiles
- (Peru) Carlo Chueca
- (United States) Jimmy Conrad
- (United States) Rene Corona †
- (Colombia) José Erick Correa
- (United States) Chris Cortez
- (France) Laurent Courtois
- (Mexico) Héctor Cuadros
- (Colombia) Yamith Cuesta
- (England) John Cunliffe
- (United States) Jim Curtin

== D ==
- (United States) Bryan de la Fuente
- (Mexico) Mario de Luna
- (Brazil) Dejair
- (Costa Rica) Darío Delgado
- (United States) Marco Delgado
- (United States) Matt Dunn

== E ==
- (United States) Eric Ebert
- (New Zealand) Simon Elliott
- (United States) Alecko Eskandarian
- (Mexico) Rodolfo Espinoza
- (Ecuador) Víctor Estupiñán

== F ==
- (United States) Gabriel Farfan
- (United States) Ryan Finley
- (United States) Matthew Fondy
- (Spain) Daniel Fragoso
- (United States) Jaime Frías

== G ==
- (Cuba) Maykel Galindo
- (Mexico) Johnny García
- (Mexico) Juan Pablo García
- (Mexico) Sergio García
- (United States) Blair Gavin
- (United States) Francisco Gomez
- (United States) Alan Gordon
- (United States) Scott Gordon
- (Honduras) Amado Guevara
- (United States) Kevin Guppy †
- (United States) Brad Guzan

== H ==
- (United States) Anthony Hamilton
- (Saint Kitts and Nevis) Atiba Harris
- (United States) Drew Helm
- (Saint Vincent and the Grenadines) Ezra Hendrickson
- (Puerto Rico) Jason Hernandez
- (Colombia) Jhon Kennedy Hurtado

== I ==
- (El Salvador) Marvin Iraheta

== J ==
- (Canada) Ante Jazić
- (Haiti) Andrew Jean-Baptiste
- (Grenada) Shalrie Joseph

== K ==
- (Japan) Akira Kaji
- (United States) Dan Kennedy
- (United States) Sacha Kljestan

== L ==
- (United States) Nick LaBrocca
- (Sierra Leone) Michael Lahoud
- (Mexico) Eduardo Lillingston
- (United States) Carlos Llamosa
- (New Zealand) Tony Lochhead
- (Mexico) Alfonso Loera
- (Brazil) David Lopes
- (Mexico) Aaron López
- (United States) Rodrigo López

== M ==
- (Costa Rica) José Macotelo
- (Venezuela) Giancarlo Maldonado
- (United States) Jesse Marsch
- (Mexico) Antonio Martínez
- (Brazil) Thiago Martins
- (El Salvador) Gerson Mayen
- (United States) Rauwshan McKenzie
- (United States) Patrick McLain
- (United States) Thomas McNamara
- (Mexico) Edgar Mejía
- (United States) Tim Melia
- (Mexico) Francisco Mendoza
- (France) Laurent Merlin
- (Ecuador) Oswaldo Minda
- (Argentina) Marcos Mondaini
- (England) Luke Moore
- (Mexico) Jesús Morales
- (Mexico) Julio Morales
- (Venezuela) Alejandro Moreno
- (United States) Mike Munoz †

== N ==
- (Brazil) Paulo Nagamura
- (Honduras) Ramón Núñez
- (Panama) Roberto Nurse

== O ==
- (United States) John O'Brien †
- (Mexico) Jesús Ochoa

== P ==
- (Mexico) Jesús Padilla
- (United States) Daniel Paladini
- (Mexico) Francisco Palencia
- (United States) Lance Parker
- (United States) Heath Pearce
- (Argentina) Agustín Pelletieri
- (United States) Orlando Perez
- (Mexico) Martín Ponce
- (Canada) Chris Pozniak
- (El Salvador) Steve Purdy

== R ==
- (Mexico) Ramón Ramírez
- (United States) Ante Razov
- (United States) Tim Regan
- (England) Nigel Reo-Coker
- (United States) James Riley
- (Mexico) José Manuel Rivera
- (Argentina) Martín Rivero
- (United States) Cesar Romero
- (El Salvador) Osael Romero
- (Mexico) Isaac Romo
- (Argentina) Mauro Rosales

== S ==
- (Brazil) Maicon Santos
- (Brazil) Marcelo Saragosa
- (United States) Keith Savage
- (Costa Rica) Douglas Sequeira
- (England) Ryan Smith
- (Mexico) Erasmo Solórzano †
- (United States) Josue Soto
- (United States) Trevor Spangenberg †
- (Serbia) Bojan Stepanović
- (United States) Nathan Sturgis
- (Mexico) Claudio Suárez
- (United States) Ryan Suarez

== T ==
- (United States) Carey Talley
- (United States) Matt Taylor
- (Jamaica) Shavar Thomas
- (United States) Zach Thornton
- (United States) Donny Toia
- (United States) Arturo Torres
- (Mexico) Erick Torres
- (United States) Casey Townsend
- (Mexico) Mariano Trujillo
- (United States) Kris Tyrpak

== U ==
- (Costa Rica) Michael Umaña

== V ==
- (United States) Peter Vagenas
- (Colombia) John Alexander Valencia
- (United States) Zarek Valentin
- (United States) Lawson Vaughn
- (Mexico) Joaquín Velázquez
- (United States) Sasha Victorine
- (Peru) Walter Vílchez
- (United States) Jorge Villafaña

== W ==
- (United States) Brent Whitfield
- (Switzerland) Raphaël Wicky

== Z ==
- (United States) Eriq Zavaleta
- (United States) Ben Zemanski
- (United States) Sal Zizzo
- (Romania) Alex Zotincă
- (Mexico) Martín Zúñiga

== Sources ==
- "MLS All-Time MLS Player Register". Mlsnet.com. Major League Soccer. Archived from the original on 14 February 2009.
- "MLS Number Assignments Archive".
