= 2013 Chivas USA season =

Chivas USA
2013 season
- Owner: Jorge Vergara
- Coach: José Luis Real
- Stadium: Home Depot Center
- Major League Soccer: Conference: 9th Overall: 18th
- MLS Cup Playoffs: DNQ
- U.S. Open Cup: Fourth round vs Carolina RailHawks
- California SuperClásico: Lost (0–2–1)
- Top goalscorer: League: Erick Torres (7 goals); All: Erick Torres (7 goals)
- Highest home attendance: 9,732 vs. San Jose Earthquakes on April 27, 2013
- Lowest home attendance: 6,810 vs. FC Dallas on March 10, 2013
- Average home league attendance: League: 8,366; All: 8,366
Home colors	Away colors

The 2013 Chivas USA season was the club's ninth season of existence, and their ninth season in Major League Soccer, the top tier of the American and Canadian soccer pyramids. Chivas USA looked to rebound off a disappointing season, which saw the club finish at the bottom of the Western Conference table.

== Transfers ==
=== In ===
Date	Number	Position	Player	Previous club	Fee/notes	Ref
January 22, 2013	15	MF	(United States) Eric Avila	Colorado Rapids	Trade	
February 14, 2013	5	DF	(United States) Carlos Borja	Los Angeles Blues	Free	
February 14, 2013	25	DF	(El Salvador) Steve Purdy	Portland Timbers	Free	
February 22, 2013	14	MF	(Mexico) Giovani Casillas	(Mexico) Guadalajara	Loan	
February 22, 2013	3	DF	(Mexico) Mario de Luna	(Mexico) Guadalajara	Loan	
February 22, 2013	8	MF	(Mexico) Édgar Mejía	(Mexico) Guadalajara	Loan	
February 26, 2013	23	DF	(Mexico) Joaquín Velázquez	(Mexico) Guadalajara	Loan	
February 26, 2013	4	DF	(Peru) Walter Vílchez	(Peru) Sporting Cristal	Undisclosed	
February 27, 2013	26	DF	(United States) Emilio Orozco	(Mexico) Tigres UANL	Free	
February 27, 2013	13	MF	(United States) Josue Soto	Houston Dynamo	Free	
March 1, 2013	22	MF	(United States) Daniel Antúnez	(Finland) Inter Turku	Free	
March 1, 2013	9	FW	(Mexico) Julio Morales	(Mexico) Guadalajara	Loan	
March 1, 2013	6	FW	(Mexico) José Rivera	(Finland) RoPS	Free	
May 10, 2013	18	MF	(Mexico) Martín Ponce	(Mexico) Guadalajara	Loan	
May 14, 2013	11	MF	(United States) Gabriel Farfan	Philadelphia Union	Trade	
July 1, 2013	4	DF	(United States) Carlos Bocanegra	(Scotland) Rangers	Allocation	
July 10, 2013	10	FW	(Mexico) Erick Torres	(Mexico) Guadalajara	Loan	
July 18, 2013	17	DF	(United States) Jaime Frías	(Mexico) Guadalajara	Loan	
August 20, 2013	14	MF	(United States) Bryan de la Fuente		Free	
August 27, 2013	21	MF	(Peru) Carlo Chueca		Free	
August 30, 2013	26	FW	(United States) Matthew Fondy	Los Angeles Blues	Free	

=== Out ===
Date	Number	Position	Player	New club	Fee/notes	Ref
December 3, 2012	9	FW	(Colombia) Juan Pablo Ángel	(Colombia) Atlético Nacional	Free	
December 3, 2012	6	MF	(United States) Peter Vagenas		Re-Entry Draft	
December 3, 2012	23	DF	(United States) Danny Califf	Toronto	Re-Entry Draft	
December 3, 2012	15	FW	(Venezuela) Alejandro Moreno		Re-Entry Draft	
December 29, 2012	22	FW	(England) Ryan Smith	(Greece) Skoda Xanthi	Undisclosed	
January 22, 2013	10	MF	(United States) Nick LaBrocca	Colorado Rapids	Trade	
January 25, 2013	14	FW	(United States) Casey Townsend	D.C. United	Trade	
February 13, 2013	21	MF	(United States) Ben Zemanski	Portland Timbers	Trade	
February 14, 2013	7	DF	(United States) James Riley	D.C. United	Trade	
February 14, 2013	5	DF	(Colombia) John Alexander Valencia	(Colombia) Deportes Tolima	Free	
February 14, 2013	30	MF	(Uruguay) Paolo Cardozo	(Costa Rica) Cartaginés	Free	
February 14, 2013	58	FW	(United States) César Romero		Waived	
February 19, 2013	18	MF	(Grenada) Shalrie Joseph	Seattle Sounders FC	Trade	
February 22, 2013	4	DF	(United States) Rauwshan McKenzie	Portland Timbers	Free	
April 15, 2013	24	GK	(United States) Patrick McLain	Los Angeles Blues	Loan	
May 7, 2013	11	FW	(United States) Juan Agudelo	New England Revolution	Trade	
August 16, 2013	27	FW	(Colombia) José Correa	(Argentina) Gimnasia	Loan	
	13	DF	(Canada) Ante Jazić			

== Roster ==
No.	Name	Nationality	Position	Date of birth (age)	Signed from	Signed in	Contract ends	Apps.	Goals
Goalkeepers
1	Dan Kennedy	(United States)	GK	July 22, 1982 (aged 31)	(Chile) Deportes Iquique	2008			
24	Patrick McLain	(United States)	GK	August 22, 1988 (aged 25)	Cal Poly Mustangs	2012		0	0
28	Tim Melia	(United States)	GK	May 15, 1986 (aged 27)	Real Salt Lake	2012		8	0
Defenders
2	Bobby Burling	(United States)	DF	October 15, 1984 (aged 29)	Montreal Impact	2012		52	0
3	Mario de Luna	(Mexico)	DF	January 5, 1988 (aged 25)	Loan from (Mexico) Guadalajara	2013	2013	32	1
4	Carlos Bocanegra	(United States)	DF	May 25, 1979 (aged 34)	(Scotland) Rangers	2013		12	0
5	Carlos Borja	(United States)	DF	January 18, 1988 (aged 25)	Los Angeles Blues	2013			
17	Jaime Frías	(United States)	DF	February 18, 1993 (aged 20)	Loan from (Mexico) Guadalajara	2013	2013	4	0
23	Joaquín Velázquez	(Mexico)	DF	September 11, 1975 (aged 38)		2013		12	1
25	Steve Purdy	(El Salvador)	DF	February 5, 1985 (aged 28)	Portland Timbers	2013		8	0
26	Emilio Orozco	(United States)	DF	April 29, 1992 (aged 21)	(Mexico) Tigres UANL	2013		0	0
Midfielders
8	Édgar Mejía	(Mexico)	MF	July 27, 1988 (aged 25)	Loan from (Mexico) Guadalajara	2013	2013	28	1
11	Gabriel Farfan	(United States)	MF	June 23, 1988 (aged 25)	Philadelphia Union	2013		16	0
12	Marco Delgado	(United States)	MF	June 23, 1988 (aged 25)	Chivas USA Academy	2012		17	0
13	Josue Soto	(United States)	MF	January 3, 1989 (aged 24)	Houston Dynamo	2013		19	0
14	Bryan de la Fuente	(United States)	MF	July 1, 1992 (aged 21)		2013			
15	Eric Avila	(United States)	MF	November 24, 1987 (aged 25)	Toronto FC	2013		29	3
18	Martín Ponce	(Mexico)	MF	June 30, 1992 (aged 21)	Loan from (Mexico) Guadalajara	2013	2013	6	0
19	Jorge Villafaña	(United States)	MF	September 16, 1989 (aged 24)	Chivas USA Academy	2007			
20	Carlos Alvarez	(United States)	MF	November 12, 1990 (aged 22)	Connecticut Huskies	2013		31	3
21	Carlo Chueca	(Peru)	MF	March 23, 1993 (aged 20)		2013		5	0
22	Daniel Antúnez	(United States)	MF	February 10, 1986 (aged 27)	(Finland) Inter Turku	2013		3	0
30	Oswaldo Minda	(Ecuador)	MF	July 26, 1983 (aged 30)	(Ecuador) Deportivo Quito	2012		40	2
31	Marvin Iraheta	(El Salvador)	MF	May 31, 1992 (aged 21)	New York Cosmos U-23	2012		15	0
Forwards
6	José Rivera	(Mexico)	FW	June 16, 1986 (aged 27)	(Finland) RoPS	2013		10	0
7	Tristan Bowen	(United States)	FW	January 30, 1991 (aged 22)	LA Galaxy	2011		31	2
9	Julio Morales	(Mexico)	FW	December 19, 1993 (aged 19)	Loan from (Mexico) Guadalajara	2013	2013	17	2
10	Erick Torres	(Mexico)	FW	January 19, 1993 (aged 20)	Loan from (Mexico) Guadalajara	2013		15	7
26	Matthew Fondy	(United States)	FW	July 28, 1989 (aged 24)	Los Angeles Blues	2013		7	0
Away on loan
27	José Correa	(Colombia)	FW	July 20, 1992 (aged 20)	(Colombia) Boyacá Chicó	2012		36	5
	Caleb Calvert	(United States)	FW	October 22, 1996 (aged 17)	Chivas USA Academy	2013		0	0
Left Chivas USA
4	Walter Vílchez	(Peru)	DF	February 20, 1982 (aged 31)	(Peru) Sporting Cristal	2013		12	1
10	Miler Bolaños	(Ecuador)	MF	June 1, 1990 (aged 23)	Loan from (Ecuador) LDU Quito	2012	2013	31	3
11	Juan Agudelo	(United States)	FW	November 23, 1992 (aged 20)	New York Red Bulls	2012		29	4
13	Ante Jazić	(Canada)	DF	February 26, 1976 (aged 37)	LA Galaxy	2009			
14	Giovani Casillas	(Mexico)	MF	January 4, 1994 (aged 19)	Loan from (Mexico) Guadalajara	2013	2013	6	1
16	Laurent Courtois	(France)	MF	September 11, 1978 (aged 35)	(France) Grenoble	2011		36	3

=== Kits ===
Home	Home Alt.	Home Alt. 2	Away

Type	Shirt	Shorts	Socks	First appearance / Info
Home	Red / White	Navy	Navy	
Home Alt.	Red / White	Navy	Red	MLS, March 2 against Columbus
Home Alt. 2	Red / White	Navy	White	MLS, May 25 against Colorado → 2011 Away Socks
Away	Navy	Red	Navy	

== Friendlies ==
January 26, 2013	Chivas USA	4–1	UC Irvine	Carson, California, US
	Correa 10'; Bowen 68'; López 71'; Zemanski 77'	Report	Iwasa 29'	Stadium: Home Depot Center

January 30, 2013	Chivas USA	4–1	FC Santa Clarita	Carson, California, US
	Bolaños 18', 35'; Correa 31'; Rivera 39'	Report	Ibarra 33'	Stadium: Home Depot Center

February 5, 2013	Chivas USA	1–1	Chicago Fire	Carson, California, US
	Bolaños 39'	Report	Atouba 52'	Stadium: Home Depot Center

February 9, 2013	Chivas USA	7–3	Gangwon FC	Carson, California, US
	Bolaños 39', 68'; Bowen 56', 71'; Correa 94', 110'; Morales 127'	Report	Zicu 10'; J. Kim 19'; E. Kim 39'	Stadium: Home Depot Center

February 15, 2013	Chivas USA	3–0	Colorado Rapids	Whitney, Nevada, US
	Avila 3'; Agudelo 56'; Correa 60'	Report		Stadium: Sam Boyd Stadium

February 19, 2013	Chivas USA	0–0	Gangwon FC	Fullerton, California, US
		Report		Stadium: Titan Stadium

February 23, 2013	Chivas USA	5–1	Los Angeles Blues	Carson, California, US
	Casillas 47', 51'; Rivera 53'; Avila 56'; Bowen 86'	Report	Davis 34'	Stadium: Home Depot Center

== Competitions ==
=== MLS ===
==== League table ====
Pos	Team	Pld	W	L	T	GF	GA	GD	Pts	Qualification
1	Portland Timbers	34	14	5	15	54	33	+21	57	Qualification for the conference semifinals
2	Real Salt Lake	34	16	10	8	57	41	+16	56	Qualification for the conference semifinals
3	LA Galaxy	34	15	11	8	53	38	+15	53	Qualification for the conference semifinals
4	Seattle Sounders FC	34	15	12	7	42	42	0	52	Qualification for the knockout round
5	Colorado Rapids	34	14	11	9	45	38	+7	51	Qualification for the knockout round
6	San Jose Earthquakes	34	14	11	9	35	42	−7	51	
7	Vancouver Whitecaps FC	34	13	12	9	53	45	+8	48	
8	FC Dallas	34	11	12	11	48	52	−4	44	
9	Chivas USA	34	6	20	8	30	67	−37	26	

Source: MLS

Pos	Team	Pld	W	L	T	GF	GA	GD	Pts	
1	New York Red Bulls (S)	34	17	9	8	58	41	+17	59	Qualification for the CONCACAF Champions League
2	Sporting Kansas City (C)	34	17	10	7	47	30	+17	58	Qualification for the CONCACAF Champions League
3	Portland Timbers	34	14	5	15	54	33	+21	57	Qualification for the CONCACAF Champions League
4	Real Salt Lake	34	16	10	8	57	41	+16	56	
5	LA Galaxy	34	15	11	8	53	38	+15	53	
6	Seattle Sounders FC	34	15	12	7	42	42	0	52	
7	New England Revolution	34	14	11	9	49	38	+11	51	
8	Colorado Rapids	34	14	11	9	45	38	+7	51	
9	Houston Dynamo	34	14	11	9	41	41	0	51	
10	San Jose Earthquakes	34	14	11	9	35	42	−7	51	
11	Montreal Impact (V)	34	14	13	7	50	49	+1	49	Qualification for the CONCACAF Champions League
12	Chicago Fire	34	14	13	7	47	52	−5	49	
13	Vancouver Whitecaps FC	34	13	12	9	53	45	+8	48	
14	Philadelphia Union	34	12	12	10	42	44	−2	46	
15	FC Dallas	34	11	12	11	48	52	−4	44	
16	Columbus Crew	34	12	17	5	42	46	−4	41	
17	Toronto FC	34	6	17	11	30	47	−17	29	
18	Chivas USA	34	6	20	8	30	67	−37	26	
19	D.C. United (U)	34	3	24	7	22	59	−37	16	Qualification for the CONCACAF Champions League

Source: MLS
Rules for classification: 1) points; 2) head-to-head record; 3) goal difference; 4) number of goals scored
(C) MLS Cup champions; (S) Supporters' Shield winners; (U) U.S. Open Cup winners; (V) Canadian Championship winners

==== Results summary ====
Overall								Home						Away					
Pld	Pts	W	L	T	GF	GA	GD	W	L	T	GF	GA	GD	W	L	T	GF	GA	GD
34	26	6	20	8	30	67	−37	5	8	4	17	29	−12	1	12	4	13	38	−25

Last updated: October 26, 2013
Source: 2013 Major League Soccer season
Pld = Matches played; Pts = Points; W = Matches won; T = Matches tied; L = Matches lost; GF = Goals for; GA = Goals against; GD = Goal difference

==== Results by round ====
Round	1	2	3	4	5	6	7	8	9	10	11	12	13	14	15	16	17	18	19	20	21	22	23	24	25	26	27	28	29	30	31	32	33	34
Stadium	H	H	A	A	H	H	A	H	A	A	H	A	H	A	H	H	A	A	A	H	A	A	H	H	H	A	A	H	H	A	H	A	A	H
Result	L	W	D	W	W	L	L	D	L	L	L	L	L	L	L	D	D	D	L	W	L	L	D	L	W	D	L	W	D	L	L	L	L	L

Updated to match(es) played on July 3, 2013. Source: Regular season matches
A = Away; H = Home; W = Win; D = Draw; L = Loss

==== Results ====
March 2, 2013 1	Chivas USA	0–3	Columbus Crew	Carson
19:30 PST	Morales (yellow card) 8'; Avila (yellow card) 28'; Bowen (yellow card) 75'; Iraheta (yellow card) 79'; Burling (yellow card) 90+1'	Report	Higuaín 51'; Williams 88'; Oduro 90+4'	Stadium: The Home Depot Center; Attendance: 7,121; Referee: Chris Penso

March 10, 2013 2	Chivas USA	3–1	FC Dallas	Carson
14:00 PST	Burling (yellow card) 23'; Minda (yellow card) 55' (goal) 76'; Luna (yellow card) 67'; Agudelo 68'; Casillas 90'	Report	Ferreira 57'	Stadium: The Home Depot Center; Attendance: 6,810; Referee: Armando Villareal

March 17, 2013 3 SuperClasico	LA Galaxy	1–1	Chivas USA	Carson
14:00 PST	Franklin (yellow card) 28'; Sarvas (yellow card) 33'; McBean 83'; Keane (yellow card) 90+4'	Report	Iraheta (yellow card) 23'; Velázquez (red card) 40'; Alvarez 89'	Stadium: The Home Depot Center; Attendance: 19,117; Referee: Ricardo Salazar

March 24, 2013 4	Chicago Fire	1–4	Chivas USA	Bridgeview
14:00 PST	Paladini (yellow card) 22'; Nyarko 64'	Report	Burling (yellow card) 26'; Bowen (yellow card) 41'; Mejía 57'; Velázquez 73'; Agudelo 75'; Anibaba 88' (o.g.)	Stadium: Toyota Park; Attendance: 9,723; Referee: Sorin Stoica

March 30, 2013 5	Chivas USA	2–1	Vancouver Whitecaps FC	Carson
19:30 PST	Davidson 12' (o.g.); Avila 55'	Report	Reo-Coker (yellow card) 54'; Miller 64'	Stadium: The Home Depot Center; Attendance: 8,354; Referee: Ismail Elfath

April 13, 2013 6	Chivas USA	0–1	Colorado Rapids	Carson
19:30 PST	Villafaña (yellow card) 33'; Burling (yellow card) 45+1'; Velázquez (yellow card) 52' de Luna (yellow card) 86'	Report	Brown 7' (pen.); Wynne (yellow card) 84'	Stadium: The Home Depot Center; Attendance: 8,219; Referee: Kevin Stott

April 20, 2013 7	Real Salt Lake	1–0	Chivas USA	Sandy
18:00 PST	Morales 53'; Grabavoy (yellow card) 76'; Palmer (yellow card) 90'	Report	de Luna (yellow card) 18'; Burling (yellow card) 59'; Velázquez (yellow card) 87'; Mejía (red card) 90+2'	Stadium: Rio Tinto Stadium; Attendance: 14,900; Referee: Jorge Gonzalez

April 27, 2013 8	Chivas USA	2–2	San Jose Earthquakes	Carson
19:30 PST	Bowen (yellow card) 41' (goal) 51' de Luna 47' (yellow card) 73'	Report	Wondolowski 40'; Chávez (yellow card) 43'; Cato 76'; Salinas (yellow card) 83'	Stadium: The Home Depot Center; Attendance: 9,732; Referee: Mark Geiger

May 5, 2013 9	Sporting Kansas City	4–0	Chivas USA	Kansas City
12:00 PST	Bieler 41', 57' (pen.); Nagamura (yellow card) 58'; Zusi 65'; Sapong 87'	Report	Velázquez (yellow card) 1'; Morales (yellow card) 26'; Kennedy (red card) 55'; Alvarez (yellow card) 74'	Stadium: Sporting Park; Attendance: 18,811; Referee: Baldomero Toledo

May 12, 2013 10	Portland Timbers	3–0	Chivas USA	Portland
14:00 PST	Wallace 34'; Valeri 70'; Johnson 90+2'	Report	Borja (yellow card) 73' de Luna (yellow card) 86'	Stadium: Jeld-Wen Field; Attendance: 20,674; Referee: Silviu Petrescu

May 19, 2013 11	Chivas USA	1–4	Real Salt Lake	Carson
19:30 PST	Ponce (yellow card) 33'; Vilchez (yellow card) 34'; Villafaña 55'	Report	Grabavoy 4', 90+1'; Plata 48'; Findley 78'	Stadium: The Home Depot Center; Attendance: 8,125; Referee: Sorin Stoica

May 25, 2013 12	Colorado Rapids	2–0	Chivas USA	Commerce City
18:00 PST	Harris 11'; Sturgis 78'	Report	Alvarez (yellow card) 41'; Burling (yellow card) 45'	Stadium: Dick's Sporting Goods Park; Attendance: 18,204; Referee: Allen Chapman

June 1, 2013 13	Chivas USA	0–2	Seattle Sounders FC	Carson
19:30 PST		Report	Martins 22' de Luna 33' (o.g.)	Stadium: The Home Depot Center; Attendance: 9,053; Referee: Ricardo Salazar

June 19, 2013 14	Vancouver Whitecaps FC	3–1	Chivas USA	Vancouver
19:00 PST	Harvey 45+2'; Sanvezzo 45+4', 81'	Report	Bowen 7' (yellow card) 53'; Alvarez (yellow card) 40'	Stadium: BC Place; Attendance: 16,130; Referee: Ismail Elfath

June 23, 2013 15 SuperClasico	Chivas USA	0–1	LA Galaxy	Carson
20:00 PST	Vílchez (yellow card) 82'	Report	Zardes 44'; Dunivant (yellow card) 90+1'	Stadium: The Home Depot Center; Attendance: 14,575; Referee: Hilario Grajeda

June 29, 2013 16	Chivas USA	1–1	New England Revolution	Carson
19:30 PST	Courtois 18'; Alvarez (yellow card) 71'; Bowen (yellow card) 74'	Report	Simms (yellow card) 31'; Barrett 88'; Nguyen (yellow card) 90'	Stadium: The Home Depot Center; Attendance: 7,319; Referee: Elias Bazakos

July 4, 2013 17	FC Dallas	0–0	Chivas USA	Frisco
18:00 PST	Loyd (yellow card) 70'; Castillo (yellow card) 89'	Report	Villafaña (yellow card) 45'; Farfan (yellow card) 55'; Rivera (yellow card) 84'	Stadium: Toyota Stadium; Attendance: 22,035; Referee: Edvin Jurisevic

July 7, 2013 18	Montreal Impact	1–1	Chivas USA	Montreal
16:00 PST	Bernier 80' (pen.) (yellow card) 84'	Report	Borja (yellow card) 39'; Avila 55'	Stadium: Saputo Stadium; Attendance: 18,932; Referee: Allen Chapman

July 12, 2013 19	Philadelphia Union	3–1	Chivas USA	Chester
16:30 PST	Okugo (yellow card) 56'; Carroll 58'; Farfan 82'; Casey 89'	Report	Correa 14'; Soto (yellow card) 21' (yellow-red card) 79'; Vilchez (yellow card) 35'; Delgado (yellow card) 42'	Stadium: PPL Park; Attendance: 15,172; Referee: Jorge Gonzalez

July 17, 2013 20	Chivas USA	1–0	Toronto FC	Carson
19:30 PST	Bocanegra (yellow card) 17'; Avila (red card) 25'; Torres 79'	Report	Agbossoumonde (yellow card) 44'; Braun (yellow card) 55'	Stadium: The Home Depot Center; Attendance: 7,851; Referee: Sorin Stoica

July 28, 2013 21	Seattle Sounders FC	2–1	Chivas USA	Seattle
20:00 PST	Traoré (yellow card) 14'; Evans 23'; Neagle 57'; Ianni (yellow card) 71'	Report	Torres 16'; Bowen (yellow card) 69'	Stadium: CenturyLink Field; Attendance: 38,463; Referee: Kevin Stott

August 4, 2013 22	San Jose Earthquakes	2–0	Chivas USA	Santa Clara
20:00 PST	Goodson (yellow card) 43'; Wondolowski 45', 87'	Report	Bocanegra (red card) 62'; Kennedy (yellow card) 63'; Torres (yellow card) 74'; Soto (yellow card) 77'	Stadium: Buck Shaw Stadium; Attendance: 10,525; Referee: Armando Villarreal

August 11, 2013 23	Chivas USA	1–1	Colorado Rapids	Carson
20:00 PST	Alvarez 5'; Purdy (yellow card) 28'; Farfan (red card) 34'; Bowen (red card) 63'; Delgado (yellow card) 90+2'	Report	Cascio (yellow card) 40' (yellow-red card) 49'; Rivero 80'; Sturgis (yellow card) 90+3'	Stadium: The Home Depot Center; Attendance: 8,221; Referee: Chris Penso

August 21, 2013 24	Chivas USA	1–3	FC Dallas	Carson
19:30 PST	de la Fuente 43'	Report	Jackson (yellow card) 58' (yellow-red card) 81'; Benítez (yellow card) 60'; Pérez 71'; Ferreira 86'; Núñez 90'	Stadium: The Home Depot Center; Attendance: 7,071; Referee: Juan Guzman

August 25, 2013 25	Chivas USA	3–2	New York Red Bulls	Carson
14:00 PST	Morales 29'; Torres 45+1' (pen.), 81'; Mejía (yellow card) 87'	Report	Cahill 31'; Wright-Phillips (yellow card) 76'; McCarty 86'	Stadium: The Home Depot Center; Attendance: 8,103; Referee: Kevin Stott

September 1, 2013 26	Vancouver Whitecaps FC	2–2	Chivas USA	Vancouver
16:00 PST	Lee (yellow card) 57'; Koffie 64'; Heinemann 90+3'	Report	Torres 3', 14'; Borja (yellow card) 42'	Stadium: BC Place; Attendance: 18,767; Referee: Dave Gantar

September 4, 2013 27	Seattle Sounders FC	1–0	Chivas USA	Seattle
19:00 PST	Neagle 24'	Report	de Luna (yellow card) 35'; Minda (yellow card) 65'	Stadium: CenturyLink Field; Attendance: 38,317; Referee: Mark Geiger

September 8, 2013 28	Chivas USA	1–0	D.C. United	Carson
18:00 PST	Bocanegra (yellow card) 45+3'; Torres 51'	Report		Stadium: The Home Depot Center; Attendance: 7,781; Referee: Mark Kadlecik

September 14, 2013 29	Chivas USA	1–1	Portland Timbers	Carson
19:30 PST	de la Fuente 23'; Minda (yellow card) 25'; Borja (yellow card) 84'	Report	Valeri 50'	Stadium: The Home Depot Center; Attendance: 5,123; Referee: Matthew Foerster

September 21, 2013 30	Houston Dynamo	5–1	Chivas USA	Houston
17:30 PST	Barnes 39', 54'; Bruin 63'; Boswell (yellow card) 70'; García 79', 90+1'	Report	Alvarez (yellow card) 41'; Avila 50'; Minda (yellow card) 52'; Torres (yellow card) 53'	Stadium: BBVA Compass Stadium; Attendance: 20,157; Referee: Elias Bazakos

September 29, 2013 31	Chivas USA	0–1	San Jose Earthquakes	Carson
20:00 PST	Minda (yellow card) 31'; Mejía (yellow card) 56'; Kennedy (yellow card) 69'	Report	Lenhart (yellow card) 30' (yellow-red card) 83'; Wondolowski 87'	Stadium: The Home Depot Center; Attendance: 7,751; Referee: Jose Rivero

October 6, 2013 32 SuperClasico	LA Galaxy	5–0	Chivas USA	Carson
14:00 PST	Keane 6', 90'; Donovan 23', 41'; Zardes 26'	Report		Stadium: The Home Depot Center; Attendance: 21,160; Referee: Jair Marrufo

October 23, 2013 33	Real Salt Lake	2–1	Chivas USA	Sandy
18:00 PST	Schuler (yellow card) 13'; Borchers (yellow card) 31'; Saborío 49'; Plata 52'	Report	Torres (yellow card) 45+1'; Minda (yellow card) 47'; Morales 77'	Stadium: Rio Tinto Stadium; Attendance: 20,447; Referee: Silviu Petrescu

October 26, 2013 34	Chivas USA	0–5	Portland Timbers	Carson
19:30 PST		Report	Valeri 16', 29'; Wallace 34'; R.Johnson 72'; W.Johnson 76'	Stadium: The Home Depot Center; Attendance: 11,024; Referee: Drew Fischer

=== U.S. Open Cup ===
May 28, 2013 Third round	Los Angeles Blues	1–2	Chivas USA	Fullerton
19:30 PDT	Davis IV 11'	Report	Alvarez 53' (yellow card) 68'; Kennedy 62' (pen.); Bolaños (yellow card) 72' de Luna (yellow card) 77'	Stadium: Titan Stadium; Attendance: 2,520; Referee: Daniel Radford

June 12, 2013 Fourth round	Carolina RailHawks	3–1 (a.e.t.)	Chivas USA	Cary
19:15 PDT	Shipalane 13' da Luz (yellow card) 38'; Hamilton (yellow card) 71'; Elizondo 92'; Low (yellow card) 94'; Ackley 98'	Report	Soto (yellow card) 25'; Borja (yellow card) 32'; Vílchez 57'; Farfan (yellow card) 94'; Courtois (yellow card) 119'	Stadium: WakeMed Soccer Park; Attendance: 5,066; Referee: Alejandro Mariscal

== Squad statistics ==
As of match played June 12, 2013

=== Appearances and goals ===
No.	Pos	Nat	Player	Total		Major League Soccer		U.S. Open Cup	
No.	Pos	Nat	Player	Apps	Goals	Apps	Goals	Apps	Goals
1	GK	(United States) USA	Dan Kennedy	33	1	31	0	2	1
2	DF	(United States) USA	Bobby Burling	23	0	18+5	0	0	0
3	DF	(Mexico) MEX	Mario de Luna	32	1	30	1	2	0
4	DF	(United States) USA	Carlos Bocanegra	12	0	12	0	0	0
5	DF	(United States) USA	Carlos Borja	28	0	22+4	0	2	0
6	FW	(Mexico) MEX	José Rivera	10	0	3+6	0	0+1	0
7	FW	(United States) USA	Tristan Bowen	24	2	15+7	2	2	0
8	MF	(Mexico) MEX	Édgar Mejía	28	1	27+1	1	0	0
9	FW	(Mexico) MEX	Julio Morales	17	2	9+8	2	0	0
10	FW	(Mexico) MEX	Erick Torres	15	7	15	7	0	0
11	MF	(United States) USA	Gabriel Farfan	16	0	10+4	0	1+1	0
12	MF	(United States) USA	Marco Delgado	16	0	13+3	0	0	0
13	MF	(United States) USA	Josue Soto	19	0	11+6	0	2	0
14	MF	(United States) USA	Bryan de la Fuente	11	2	11	2	0	0
15	MF	(United States) USA	Eric Avila	29	3	24+4	3	0+1	0
17	DF	(United States) USA	Jaime Frías	4	0	3+1	0	0	0
18	MF	(Mexico) MEX	Martín Ponce	6	0	1+4	0	1	0
19	MF	(United States) USA	Jorge Villafaña	22	1	15+5	1	1+1	0
20	MF	(United States) USA	Carlos Alvarez	31	3	26+3	2	2	1
21	MF	(Peru) PER	Carlo Chueca	5	0	1+4	0	0	0
22	MF	(United States) USA	Daniel Antúnez	3	0	1+2	0	0	0
23	DF	(Mexico) MEX	Joaquín Velázquez	13	1	12	1	1	0
25	DF	(El Salvador) ESA	Steve Purdy	8	0	5+3	0	0	0
26	FW	(United States) USA	Matthew Fondy	7	0	1+6	0	0	0
28	GK	(United States) USA	Tim Melia	2	0	2	0	0	0
30	MF	(Ecuador) ECU	Oswaldo Minda	17	1	15+1	1	1	0
31	MF	(El Salvador) ESA	Marvin Iraheta	15	0	5+8	0	1+1	0
Players away from Chivas USA on loan:
27	FW	(Colombia) COL	José Correa	17	1	12+4	1	1	0
Players who left Chivas USA during the season:
4	DF	(Peru) PER	Walter Vílchez	12	1	11	0	1	1
10	MF	(Ecuador) ECU	Miler Bolaños	6	0	2+3	0	1	0
11	FW	(United States) USA	Juan Agudelo	6	0	4+2	0	0	0
13	DF	(Canada) CAN	Ante Jazić	1	0	1	0	0	0
14	MF	(Mexico) MEX	Giovani Casillas	6	1	2+3	1	1	0
16	MF	(France) FRA	Laurent Courtois	5	1	2+2	1	0+1	0

=== Goal scorers ===
Place	Position	Nation	Number	Name	MLS	U.S. Open Cup	Total
1	FW	(Mexico)	10	Erick Torres	7	0	7
2	MF	(United States)	15	Eric Avila	3	0	3
2	MF	(United States)	20	Carlos Alvarez	2	1	3
4	FW	(United States)	11	Juan Agudelo	2	0	2
4	FW	(United States)	7	Tristan Bowen	2	0	2
4	MF	(United States)	14	Bryan de la Fuente	2	0	2
4	FW	(Mexico)	9	Julio Morales	2	0	2
4				Own goal	2	0	2
9	MF	(Ecuador)	30	Oswaldo Minda	1	0	1
9	MF	(Mexico)	14	Giovani Casillas	1	0	1
9	MF	(Mexico)	8	Édgar Mejía	1	0	1
9	DF	(Mexico)	23	Joaquín Velázquez	1	0	1
9	DF	(Mexico)	3	Mario de Luna	1	0	1
9	MF	(United States)	19	Jorge Villafaña	1	0	1
9	MF	(France)	16	Laurent Courtois	1	0	1
9	FW	(Colombia)	27	José Correa	1	0	1
9	GK	(United States)	1	Dan Kennedy	0	1	1
9	DF	(Peru)	4	Walter Vílchez	0	1	1
				TOTALS	30	3	33

=== Disciplinary record ===
Number	Nation	Position	Name	MLS			U.S. Open Cup			Total		
Number	Nation	Position	Name	Yellow card	(yellow card) (yellow-red card)	Red card	Yellow card	(yellow card) (yellow-red card)	Red card	Yellow card	(yellow card) (yellow-red card)	Red card
1	(United States)	GK	Dan Kennedy	2	0	1	0	0	0	2	0	1
2	(United States)	DF	Bobby Burling	6	0	0	0	0	0	6	0	0
3	(Mexico)	DF	Mario de Luna	6	0	0	1	0	0	7	0	0
4	(Peru)	DF	Walter Vílchez	3	0	0	0	0	0	3	0	0
4	(United States)	DF	Carlos Bocanegra	2	0	1	0	0	0	2	0	1
5	(United States)	DF	Carlos Borja	4	0	0	1	0	0	5	0	0
6	(Mexico)	FW	José Rivera	1	0	0	0	0	0	1	0	0
7	(United States)	FW	Tristan Bowen	6	0	1	0	0	0	6	0	1
8	(Mexico)	MF	Édgar Mejía	2	0	1	0	0	0	2	0	1
9	(Mexico)	FW	Julio Morales	2	0	0	0	0	0	2	0	0
10	(Ecuador)	MF	Miler Bolaños	0	0	0	1	0	0	1	0	0
10	(Mexico)	FW	Erick Torres	3	0	0	0	0	0	3	0	0
11	(United States)	MF	Gabriel Farfan	2	0	1	1	0	0	3	0	1
12	(United States)	MF	Marco Delgado	2	0	0	0	0	0	2	0	0
13	(United States)	MF	Josue Soto	2	1	0	1	0	0	3	1	0
15	(United States)	MF	Eric Avila	1	0	1	0	0	0	1	0	1
16	(France)	MF	Laurent Courtois	0	0	0	1	0	0	1	0	0
18	(Mexico)	MF	Martín Ponce	1	0	0	0	0	0	1	0	0
19	(United States)	MF	Jorge Villafaña	2	0	0	0	0	0	2	0	0
20	(United States)	MF	Carlos Alvarez	5	0	0	1	0	0	6	0	0
23	(Mexico)	DF	Joaquín Velázquez	3	0	1	0	0	0	3	0	1
25	(El Salvador)	DF	Steve Purdy	1	0	0	0	0	0	1	0	0
30	(Ecuador)	MF	Oswaldo Minda	6	0	0	0	0	0	6	0	0
31	(El Salvador)	MF	Marvin Iraheta	2	0	0	0	0	0	2	0	0
			TOTALS	64	1	7	7	0	0	71	1	7
