= 2013 San Jose Earthquakes season =

San Jose Earthquakes
2013 season
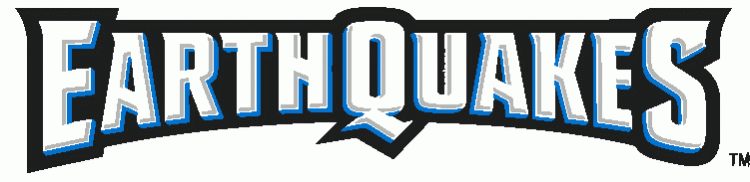
- Owner: Earthquakes Soccer, LLC
- Coach: Mark Watson
- Stadium: Buck Shaw Stadium
- Major League Soccer: Conference: 6th Overall: 10th
- MLS Cup Playoffs: Did not qualify
- U.S. Open Cup: Third round
- CONCACAF: Quarterfinals
- California Clásico: 2nd (1-1-1)
- Heritage Cup: 2nd (1-1-0)
- Timbers Tournament: 1st (1–0–2)
- Top goalscorer: Chris Wondolowski (11)
Home colors	Away colors	Third colors

The 2013 San Jose Earthquakes season was the club's 16th year of existence, as well as its 16th season in Major League Soccer and its sixth consecutive season in the top-flight of American soccer. Including all previous franchises, this is the 31st year with a soccer club in the San Jose area sporting the name "Earthquakes".

San Jose entered the season as the defending Supporters' Shield winners, having the best regular season in 2012.

== Club ==
=== Roster ===
As of September 14, 2013.

No.	Position	Nation	Player
1	GK	USA	David Bingham (GA)
2	DF	USA	Ty Harden
3	DF	USA	Dan Gargan
4	MF	USA	Sam Cronin
5	DF	HON	Víctor Bernárdez
6	MF	USA	Shea Salinas
7	MF	TRI	Cordell Cato
8	FW	USA	Chris Wondolowski (DP / Vice-Captain)
9	FW	USA	Mike Fucito
10	MF	HON	Walter Martínez
11	MF	MAR	Mehdi Ballouchy
12	MF	USA	Ramiro Corrales (Captain)
13	GK	USA	Evan Newton
14	FW	USA	Adam Jahn
15	DF	USA	Justin Morrow
16	FW	USA	Steven Lenhart
17	MF	USA	Sam Garza (GA)
18	GK	USA	Jon Busch
19	MF	SLV	Jaime Alas (on loan from Rosenborg BK)
20	FW	USA	Marcus Tracy
21	DF	USA	Jason Hernandez
22	DF	ENG	Jordan Stewart
23	DF	CAN	Nana Attakora
24	FW	USA	Alan Gordon
25	DF	USA	Tommy Muller
27	DF	USA	Colin Mitchell
30	MF	MEX	Rafael Baca
33	DF	IRN	Steven Beitashour
44	DF	USA	Clarence Goodson
81	MF	HON	Marvin Chávez

== Club staff ==
Position	Staff
General Manager	(United States) John Doyle
Head Coach	(Canada) Mark Watson
Assistant Coach	(Canada) Nick Dasovic
Assistant Coach	(United States) Ian Russell
Goalkeeper Coach	(New Zealand) Jason Batty
Athletic Trainer	(United States) Brian Lee
Equipment Manager	(El Salvador) Jose Vega
Team Administrator	(United States) Sean Mearns
Team Doctor	(United States) Dr. Zach Vaughn

As of June 7

== Other information ==
Owner	Earthquakes Soccer, LLC
Ground (capacity and dimensions)	Buck Shaw Stadium (10,525 / 74x115 yards)

Source: San Jose Earthquakes

== Competitions ==
Win Loss Tie

=== Preseason ===
Tuesday, January 29, 2013	San Jose Earthquakes	2–0	Houston Dynamo	Tucson, Arizona
2:00 PM PST	Mitchell (yellow card) 33'; Emerson 56'; Emerson 86' (pen.)	Report		Stadium: Kino Sports Complex

Saturday, February 2, 2013	San Jose Earthquakes	0–1	Colorado Rapids	Tucson, Arizona
10:00 AM PST		Report	Smith 66'; Griffiths (yellow card) 83'	Stadium: Kino Sports Complex

Saturday, February 9, 2013	San Jose Earthquakes	0–1	Chicago Fire	Santa Barbara, California
6:00 PM PST		Report	Larentowicz 79' (pen.)	Stadium: Harder Stadium

Tuesday, February 12, 2013	San Jose Earthquakes	4–0	Ventura County Fusion	Oxnard, California
11:00 AM PST	Garza 57'; Weijl 66'; Ring; Garza	Report		Stadium: Oxnard College

=== Timbers Tournament ===
Sunday, February 17, 2013	Portland Timbers	3–3	San Jose Earthquakes	Portland, Oregon
5:00 PM PST	Johnson 5'; Johnson 27'; Johnson 52'	Report	Wondolowski 3' (pen.); Bernárdez 39'; Fucito 60'; Morrow (yellow card) 87'	Stadium: Jeld-Wen Field; Attendance: 14,229

Wednesday, February 20, 2013	San Jose Earthquakes	0–0	AIK	Portland, Oregon
5:00 PM PST	Tommy (yellow card) 72'	Report	Moro (red card) 39'; Atakora (yellow card) 45+1'	Stadium: Jeld-Wen Field

Saturday, February 23, 2013	San Jose Earthquakes	2–1	FC Dallas	Portland, Oregon
2:30 PM PST	Wondolowski 15'; Fucito 49'	Report	Jackson 26'	Stadium: Jeld-Wen Field

=== 2013 Season ===
==== Results by round ====
Overall								Home						Away					
Pld	Pts	W	L	T	GF	GA	GD	W	L	T	GF	GA	GD	W	L	T	GF	GA	GD
34	51	14	11	9	35	42	−7	11	1	5	23	13	+10	3	10	4	12	29	−17

Last updated: October 26, 2013
Source: MLSSoccer.com
Pld = Matches played; Pts = Points; W = Matches won; T = Matches tied; L = Matches lost; GF = Goals for; GA = Goals against; GD = Goal difference

Round	1	2	3	4	5	6	7	8	9	10	11	12	13	14	15	16	17	18	19	20	21	22	23	24	25	26	27	28	29	30	31	32	33	34
Stadium	H	H	A	H	A	H	A	H	A	H	H	A	H	A	A	A	A	H	A	A	H	H	H	A	H	A	A	H	H	A	A	H	A	H
Result	L	W	T	W	L	T	L	T	T	T	W	L	T	L	L	W	L	W	L	L	W	W	W	L	W	T	L	W	T	W	W	W	T	W

Updated to match(es) played on October 26, 2013. Source: MLS Results and League table
A = Away; H = Home; W = Win; L = Loss; T = Tie

==== Match results ====
Sunday, March 3, 2013 Round 1	San Jose Earthquakes	0–2	Real Salt Lake	Santa Clara, California
7:00 PM PST	Bernárdez (yellow card) 64'	Report	Mansally (yellow card) 61'; Saborío 71'; Saborío 85'; Rimando (yellow card) 87'	Stadium: Buck Shaw Stadium; Attendance: 10,525; Referee: Hilario Grajeda

Sunday, March 10, 2013 Round 2	San Jose Earthquakes	2–1	New York Red Bulls	Santa Clara, California
7:00 PM PDT	Wondolowski (yellow card) 41'; Jahn 83'; Wondolowski 92' (pen.)	Report	Alexander 17'; Alexander (yellow card) 61'	Stadium: Buck Shaw Stadium; Attendance: 10,525; Referee: Ricardo Salazar

Saturday, March 16, 2013 Round 3	Columbus Crew	1–1	San Jose Earthquakes	Columbus, Ohio
2:30 PM PDT	Gláuber 68'	Report	Morrow 73'; Bernárdez (yellow card) 87'	Stadium: Columbus Crew Stadium; Attendance: 16,528; Referee: Jorge González

Saturday, March 23, 2013 Round 4	San Jose Earthquakes	1–0	Seattle Sounders FC	Santa Clara, California
7:30 PM PDT	Wondolowski 46'	Report		Stadium: Buck Shaw Stadium; Attendance: 10,525; Referee: Baldomero Toledo

Saturday, March 30, 2013 Round 5	Houston Dynamo	2–0	San Jose Earthquakes	Houston, TX
5:30 PM PDT	Bruin 17'; Moffat (yellow card) 22'; Barnes 42'	Report	Harden (yellow card) 53'; Bernárdez (yellow card) 75'	Stadium: BBVA Compass Stadium; Attendance: 17,415; Referee: Jose Carlos Rivero

Saturday, April 6, 2013 Round 6	San Jose Earthquakes	1–1	Vancouver Whitecaps FC	Santa Clara, California
7:30 PM PDT	Wondolowski 18'; Baca (yellow card) 22'; Corrales (yellow card) 40'; Fucito (yellow card) 78'; Lenhart (yellow card) 86'	Report	Hertzog 62'; Rochat (yellow card) 65'; Teibert (yellow card) 66'	Stadium: Buck Shaw Stadium; Attendance: 10,525; Referee: Fotis Bazakos

Sunday, April 14, 2013 Round 7	Portland Timbers	1–0	San Jose Earthquakes	Portland, Oregon
7:30 PM PDT	Chará (yellow card) 44'; Johnson 78'	Report	Gordon (yellow card) 41'; Bernárdez (yellow card) 50'; Gordon (yellow card) 69' (red card)	Stadium: Jeld-Wen Field; Attendance: 20,674; Referee: Hilario Grajeda

Sunday, April 21, 2013 Round 8	San Jose Earthquakes	1–1	Portland Timbers	Santa Clara, California
8:00 PM PDT	Lenhart (yellow card) 37'; Jahn 92'	Report	Danso (yellow card) 46'; Valeri 58'; Silvestre (yellow card) 87'	Stadium: Buck Shaw Stadium; Attendance: 10,525; Referee: Armando Villarreal

Saturday, April 27, 2013 Round 9	C.D. Chivas USA	2–2	San Jose Earthquakes	Carson, California
7:30 PM PDT	Bowen (yellow card) 43' de Luna 47'; Bowen 51' de Luna (yellow card) 73'	Report	Wondolowski 40'; Chávez (yellow card) 41'; Cato 76'; Salinas (yellow card) 83'	Stadium: Home Depot Center; Attendance: 9,732; Referee: Mark Geiger

Saturday, May 4, 2013 Round 10	San Jose Earthquakes	2–2	Montreal Impact	Santa Clara, California
1:00 PM PDT	Morrow (yellow card) 19'; Cronin (yellow card) 45'; Baca (yellow card) 52'; Jahn 59'; Cronin 91'	Report	Brovsky (yellow card) 22'; Mapp 24'; Warner (yellow card) 31'; Mapp 47'	Stadium: Buck Shaw Stadium; Attendance: 10,074; Referee: Drew Fischer

Wednesday, May 8, 2013 Round 11	San Jose Earthquakes	2–1	Toronto FC	Santa Clara, California
7:30 PM PDT	Jahn 48'; Wondolowski 81'	Report	Braun 14'; Emory (yellow card) 46'; Laba (yellow card) 63'; Henry (yellow card) 66'; Lambe (yellow card) 79'	Stadium: Buck Shaw Stadium; Attendance: 10,048; Referee: Fotis Bazakos

Saturday, May 11, 2013 Round 12	Seattle Sounders FC	4–0	San Jose Earthquakes	Seattle, WA
1:00 PM PDT	Neagle 28'; Rosales 46'; Neagle 54'; Johnson (yellow card) 88'; Martins 93'	Report	Baca (yellow card) 45'; Wondolowski (yellow card) 88'	Stadium: CenturyLink Field; Attendance: 38,880; Referee: Jair Marrufo

Saturday, May 18, 2013 Round 13	San Jose Earthquakes	1–1	Colorado Rapids	Santa Clara, California
7:30 PM PDT	Bernárdez (yellow card) 73'; Chávez 78'; Lenhart (yellow card) 81'	Report	Sturgis 26'; Klute (yellow card) 43'; O'Neill (yellow card) 77'; O'Neill (red card) 90'; Wallace (yellow card) 93'	Stadium: Buck Shaw Stadium; Attendance: 10,525; Referee: Ricardo Salazar

Saturday, May 25, 2013 Round 14	FC Dallas	1–0	San Jose Earthquakes	Frisco, Texas
5:30 PM PDT	Castillo 33'; John (yellow card) 40'	Report	Jahn (yellow card) 4'; Bernárdez (yellow card) 67'; Lenhart (yellow card) 73'	Stadium: FC Dallas Stadium; Attendance: 15,063; Referee: Hilario Grajeda

Saturday, June 1, 2013 Round 15	Real Salt Lake	3–0	San Jose Earthquakes	Sandy, Utah
6:30 PM PDT	Morales 16'; Stephenson (yellow card) 24'; Grabavoy 33'; Findley 38'; Mansally (yellow card) 77'	Report	Cronin (yellow card) 39'; Gordon (yellow card) 49'	Stadium: Rio Tinto Stadium; Attendance: 19,064; Referee: Silviu Petrescu

Saturday, June 15, 2013 Round 16	Colorado Rapids	1–2	San Jose Earthquakes	Commerce City, Colorado
6:00 PM PDT	Harris (red card) 18'; Thomas (yellow card) 49'; Sturgis 67'	Report	Lenhart 11'; Wondolowski (yellow card) 49'; Cronin 52'; Gordon (yellow card) 68'; Ballouchy (yellow card) 71'; Hernandez (yellow card) 87'	Stadium: Dick's Sporting Goods Park; Attendance: 15,017; Referee: Jorge González

Saturday, June 22, 2013 Round 17	D.C. United	1–0	San Jose Earthquakes	Washington, D.C.
4:00 PM PDT	Porter (yellow card) 2'; Pontius 11' (pen.); Thorrington (yellow card) 29'	Report	Hernandez (yellow card) 36'	Stadium: RFK Stadium; Attendance: 13,149; Referee: Jair Marrufo

Saturday, June 29, 2013 Round 18	San Jose Earthquakes	3–2	Los Angeles Galaxy	Stanford, California
7:30 PM PDT	Gordon 68'; Bernárdez (yellow card) 69'; Bernárdez (yellow card) 77' (red card); Salinas 92'; Gordon 93'; Gordon (yellow card) 94'	Report	Sarvas 20'; Jiménez 65'; Sarvas (yellow card) 79'	Stadium: Stanford Stadium; Attendance: 50,028; Referee: Armando Villarreal

Wednesday, July 3, 2013 Round 19	Chicago Fire	3–2	San Jose Earthquakes	Bridgeview, Illinois
5:30 PM PDT	Duka 36'; Larentowicz (yellow card) 39'; Nyarko 47'; Rolfe 84'	Report	Gordon 14'; Lindpere 72' (o.g.)	Stadium: Toyota Park; Attendance: 14,815; Referee: Chris Penso

Saturday, July 6, 2013 Round 20	New England Revolution	2–0	San Jose Earthquakes	Foxborough, Massachusetts
4:30 PM PDT	Sène 13'; Farrell (yellow card) 37'; Imbongo 78'; Imbongo (yellow card) 94'	Report	Martínez (yellow card) 35'; Gargan (yellow card) 83'	Stadium: Gillette Stadium; Attendance: 13,732; Referee: Jose Carlos Rivero

Saturday, July 13, 2013 Round 21	San Jose Earthquakes	1–0	Seattle Sounders FC	Santa Clara, California
7:30 PM PDT	Lenhart (yellow card) 15'; Cronin (yellow card) 22'; Martínez 48'; Gordon (yellow card) 80'	Report	Scott (yellow card) 24'; Carrasco (yellow card) 42'; Hurtado (yellow card) 85'; Alonso (red card) 95'	Stadium: Buck Shaw Stadium; Attendance: 10,525; Referee: Sorin Stoica

Saturday, July 27, 2013 Round 22	San Jose Earthquakes	2–1	Portland Timbers	Santa Clara, California
7:30 PM PDT	Bernárdez 55' (pen.); Lenhart 58'; Chávez (yellow card) 85' (yellow-red card)	Report	Nagbe 83'	Stadium: Buck Shaw Stadium; Attendance: 10,525; Referee: Drew Fischer

Saturday, August 3, 2013 Round 23	San Jose Earthquakes	2–0	C.D. Chivas USA	Santa Clara, California
7:00 PM PDT	Goodson (yellow card) 43'; Wondolowski 45'; Wondolowski 87'	Report	Bocanegra (red card) 62'; Kennedy (yellow card) 63'; Torres (yellow card) 74'; Soto (yellow card) 77'	Stadium: Buck Shaw Stadium; Attendance: 10,525; Referee: Armando Villarreal

Saturday, August 10, 2013 Round 24	Vancouver Whitecaps FC	2–0	San Jose Earthquakes	Vancouver, BC
4:30 PM PDT	Camilo 60'; Camilo (yellow card) 62'; Miller 74'; Teibert (yellow card) 75'	Report	Goodson (yellow card) 6'; Baca (yellow card) 28'	Stadium: BC Place; Attendance: 20,151; Referee: Ricardo Salazar

Sunday, August 18, 2013 Round 25	San Jose Earthquakes	1–0	Sporting Kansas City	Santa Clara, California
7:00 PM PDT	Wondolowski 55'	Report	Myers (yellow card) 23'; Collin (yellow card) 32'	Stadium: Buck Shaw Stadium; Attendance: 10,525; Referee: Juan Guzman

Saturday, August 24, 2013 Round 26	FC Dallas	2–2	San Jose Earthquakes	Frisco, Texas
6:00 PM PDT	Pérez 19'; Erick (yellow card) 30'; Michel 72' (pen.); Cooper (red card) 86'	Report	Gordon 8'; Beitashour 16'; Wondolowski (yellow card) 45+1'; Morrow (red card) 81'; Bernárdez (red card) 86'	Stadium: FC Dallas Stadium; Attendance: 14,920; Referee: Baldomero Toledo

Saturday, August 31, 2013 Round 27	Los Angeles Galaxy	3–0	San Jose Earthquakes	Carson, California
7:30 PM PDT	Donovan 26'; Keane 43' (pen.); Keane 67'	Report		Stadium: StubHub Center; Attendance: 27,000; Referee: Kevin Stott

Sunday, September 8, 2013 Round 28	San Jose Earthquakes	1–0	Philadelphia Union	Santa Clara, California
8:00 PM PDT	Salinas 15'; Baca (yellow card) 45'; Baca (yellow card) 57' (red card); Gordon (yellow card) 63'; Lenhart (yellow card) 91'	Report	Cruz (yellow card) 15'; McInerney (yellow card) 20'; Daniel (yellow card) 36'	Stadium: Buck Shaw Stadium; Attendance: 10,034; Referee: Fotis Bazakos

Saturday, September 14, 2013 Round 29	San Jose Earthquakes	0–0	Vancouver Whitecaps FC	Santa Clara, California
7:30 PM PDT	Gordon (yellow card) 46'; Corrales (yellow card) 63'; Goodson (yellow card) 82'	Report		Stadium: Buck Shaw Stadium; Attendance: 10,525; Referee: Jair Marrufo

Saturday, September 21, 2013 Round 30	Real Salt Lake	1–2	San Jose Earthquakes	Sandy, Utah
6:00 PM PDT	Morales 19'; Wingert (yellow card) 65'	Report	Lenhart 18'; Lenhart 21'; Goodson (yellow card) 67'; Bernárdez (yellow card) 73'; Busch (yellow card) 93'	Stadium: Rio Tinto Stadium; Attendance: 20,504; Referee: Chris Penso

Sunday, September 29, 2013 Round 31	C.D. Chivas USA	0–1	San Jose Earthquakes	Carson, California
8:00 PM PDT	Minda (yellow card) 31'; Mejía (yellow card) 56'; Kennedy (yellow card) 697'	Report	Lenhart (yellow card) 39'; Lenhart (yellow card) 81' (red card); Wondolowski 87'	Stadium: StubHub Center; Attendance: 7,751; Referee: Jose Carlos Rivero

Wednesday, October 9, 2013 Round 32	San Jose Earthquakes	1–0	Colorado Rapids	Santa Clara, California
7:30 PM PDT	Wondolowski 69'; Wondolowski (yellow card) 78'	Report		Stadium: Buck Shaw Stadium; Attendance: 10,525; Referee: Allen Chapman

Sunday, October 20, 2013 Round 33	Los Angeles Galaxy	0–0	San Jose Earthquakes	Carson, California
6:00 PM PDT	Juninho (yellow card) 70'	Report	Cronin (yellow card) 20'; Bernárdez (yellow card) 53'	Stadium: StubHub Center; Attendance: 25,418; Referee: Baldomero Toledo

Saturday, October 26, 2013 Round 34	San Jose Earthquakes	2–1	FC Dallas	Santa Clara, California
2:30 PM PDT	Martínez 27'; Corrales (yellow card) 47'; Wondolowski 57'	Report	Benítez (yellow card) 72'; Luccin (yellow card) 85'; Keel 90'	Stadium: Buck Shaw Stadium; Attendance: 10,525; Referee: Geoff Gamble

=== U.S. Open Cup ===
Tuesday, May 28, 2013 Third round	Charleston Battery	1–0	San Jose Earthquakes	Charleston, South Carolina
4:30 PM PDT	Cuevas (yellow card) 45'; Paterson (yellow card) 62'; Falvey 73'	Report	Morrow (yellow card) 27'; Lenhart (yellow card) 30'; Ring (yellow card) 40'; Ring (yellow card) 74' (red card)	Stadium: Blackbaud Stadium

=== CONCACAF Champions League ===
==== Group stage ====
Wednesday, August 7, 2013 1	Montreal Impact (Canada)	1–0	(United States) San Jose Earthquakes	Montreal, QC
5:00 PM PDT	Warner (yellow card) 10'; Camara 16'; Di Vaio (yellow card) 72'	Report	Corrales (yellow card) 37'; Wondolowski (yellow card) 85'	Stadium: Saputo Stadium; Referee: Javier Santos

Wednesday, August 28, 2013 2	Heredia Jaguares de Peten (Guatemala)	1–0	(United States) San Jose Earthquakes	Guatemala City, GU
7:00 PM PDT	Miranda 68'	Report	Bernárdez (yellow card) 25'; Gargan (yellow card) 55'	Stadium: Estadio Cementos Progreso; Referee: José Peñaloza

Tuesday, September 17, 2013 3	San Jose Earthquakes (United States)	3–0	(Canada) Montreal Impact	Santa Clara, California
7:00 PM PDT	Wondolowski 21'; Lenhart (yellow card) 40'; Chávez 57'; Salinas 84'	Report	Arnaud (yellow card) 23'; Camara (yellow card) 35'; Romero (yellow card) 62'	Stadium: Buck Shaw Stadium; Referee: Armando Castro

Wednesday, October 23, 2013 4	San Jose Earthquakes (United States)	1–0	(Guatemala) Heredia Jaguares de Peten	Santa Clara, California
7:00 PM PDT	Wondolowski 62'; Goodson (yellow card) 65'; Goodson (yellow card) 94' (red card)	Report	Miranda (yellow card) 86'	Stadium: Buck Shaw Stadium; Attendance: 4,722; Referee: Roberto Garcia

=== International Friendlies ===
Saturday, July 20, 2013 Friendly	San Jose Earthquakes (United States)	1–0	(England) Norwich City F.C.	Santa Clara, California
7:30 PM PDT	Cato 7'; Gargan (yellow card) 29'	Report	van Wolfswinkel (yellow card) 35'; Garrido (yellow card) 40'	Stadium: Buck Shaw Stadium; Attendance: 9,631; Referee: Kevin Stott

== Standings ==
=== Western Conference ===
Pos	Team	Pld	W	L	T	GF	GA	GD	Pts	Qualification
1	Portland Timbers	34	14	5	15	54	33	+21	57	MLS Cup Conference Semifinals
2	Real Salt Lake	34	16	10	8	57	41	+16	56	MLS Cup Conference Semifinals
3	LA Galaxy	34	15	11	8	53	38	+15	53	MLS Cup Conference Semifinals
4	Seattle Sounders FC	34	15	12	7	42	42	0	52	MLS Cup Knockout Round
5	Colorado Rapids	34	14	11	9	45	38	+7	51	MLS Cup Knockout Round
6	San Jose Earthquakes	34	14	11	9	35	42	−7	51	
7	Vancouver Whitecaps FC	34	13	12	9	53	45	+8	48	
8	FC Dallas	34	11	12	11	48	52	−4	44	
9	Chivas USA	34	6	20	8	30	67	−37	26	

Source: MLS

=== Major League Soccer ===
Pos	Team	Pld	W	L	T	GF	GA	GD	Pts	Qualification
1	New York Red Bulls (S)	34	17	9	8	58	41	+17	59	CONCACAF Champions League
2	Sporting Kansas City (C)	34	17	10	7	47	30	+17	58	CONCACAF Champions League
3	Portland Timbers	34	14	5	15	54	33	+21	57	CONCACAF Champions League
4	Real Salt Lake	34	16	10	8	57	41	+16	56	
5	LA Galaxy	34	15	11	8	53	38	+15	53	
6	Seattle Sounders FC	34	15	12	7	42	42	0	52	
7	New England Revolution	34	14	11	9	49	38	+11	51	
8	Colorado Rapids	34	14	11	9	45	38	+7	51	
9	Houston Dynamo	34	14	11	9	41	41	0	51	
10	San Jose Earthquakes	34	14	11	9	35	42	−7	51	
11	Montreal Impact	34	14	13	7	50	49	+1	49	CONCACAF Champions League
12	Chicago Fire	34	14	13	7	47	52	−5	49	
13	Vancouver Whitecaps FC	34	13	12	9	53	45	+8	48	
14	Philadelphia Union	34	12	12	10	42	44	−2	46	
15	FC Dallas	34	11	12	11	48	52	−4	44	
16	Columbus Crew	34	12	17	5	42	46	−4	41	
17	Toronto FC	34	6	17	11	30	47	−17	29	
18	Chivas USA	34	6	20	8	30	67	−37	26	
19	D.C. United	34	3	24	7	22	59	−37	16	CONCACAF Champions League

Source: MLS
Rules for classification: 1) points; 2) head-to-head record; 3) goal difference; 4) number of goals scored
(C) MLS Cup Champion; (S) Supporters' Shield

== Statistics ==
=== In ===
==== MLS Drafts ====
Pos.	Player	Transferred from	Notes	Date	Ref.
FW	(United States) Marcus Tracy	(Denmark) AaB Fodbold	MLS Weighted lottery	September 11, 2012	
DF	(United States) Dan Gargan	(United States) Chicago Fire	2012 MLS Re-Entry Draft Stage Two, Round 2	December 14, 2012	
DF	(United States) Ty Harden	(United States) Toronto FC	2012 MLS Re-Entry Draft Stage Two, Round 2	December 14, 2012	
DF	(United States) Bryan Jordan *	(United States) Los Angeles Galaxy	2012 MLS Re-Entry Draft Stage Two, Round 3	December 14, 2012	
FW	(United States) Mike Fucito	(United States) Portland Timbers	Trade for 2013 MLS SuperDraft second round draft pick	December 16, 2012	
DF	(United States) Tommy Muller	(United States) Georgetown	2013 MLS SuperDraft, round 1	January 17, 2013	
MF	(United States) Dan Delgado *	(United States) San Diego (United States) Orange County Blue Star	2013 MLS SuperDraft, round 2	January 17, 2013	
FW	(United States) Adam Jahn	(United States) Stanford University	2013 MLS Supplemental Draft, round 1	January 29, 2013	
DF	(United States) Colin Mitchell	(United States) Oregon State University	2013 MLS Supplemental Draft, round 3	January 29, 2013	
DF	(Republic of Ireland) Peter McGlynn	(United States) UC Santa Barbara (United States) Ventura County Fusion	2013 MLS Supplemental Draft, round 4	January 29, 2013	

(*) Unsigned

==== Winter Transfer Window ====
No.	Pos.	Player	Transferred from	Date
23	DF	(Canada) Nana Attakora	(Finland) FC Haka	February 22, 2013
7	MF	(Trinidad and Tobago) Cordell Cato	(United States) Seattle Sounders FC	March 1, 2013
22	FW	(Sierra Leone) Abu Tommy	(Moldova) FC Sheriff Tiraspol	March 12, 2013
10	FW	(Honduras) Walter Martínez	(China) Chongqing F.C.	March 15, 2013

==== Summer Transfer Window ====
No.	Pos.	Player	Transferred from	Date
44	DF	(United States) Clarence Goodson	(Denmark) Brøndby I.F.	June 28, 2013
22	DF	(England) Jordan Stewart	(England) Coventry City	July 2013

==== Loans ====
No.	Pos.	Player	Loaned from	Date
19	MF	(El Salvador) Jaime Alas	(Norway) Rosenborg BK	July 17, 2013

=== Out ===
No.	Pos.	Player	Transferred to	Fee/notes	Date	Ref.
28	DF	(United States) Jed Zayner	None	Retired	November 7, 2012	
20	DF	(United States) Tim Ward	None	Released	November 28, 2012	
14	MF	(Haiti) Jean Alexandre	None	Out of contract	December 3, 2012	
17	MF	(United States) Joey Gjertsen	None	Out of contract	December 3, 2012	
55	DF	(United States) Ike Opara	(United States) Sporting Kansas City	Traded for Sporting KC's 2013 MLS SuperDraft second round selection	December 12, 2012	
7	MF	(Jamaica) Khari Stephenson	None	Out of contract	December 3, 2012	
-	DF	(United States) Bryan Jordan	None	Unsigned 2012 MLS Re-Entry Draft Pick	March 1, 2013	
27	DF	(United States) Colin Mitchell	None	Released	July 2013	
12	MF	(United States) Ramiro Corrales	None	Retired	October 26, 2013	
3	DF	(United States) Dan Gargan	None	Out of contract	November 22, 2013	
23	DF	(Canada) Nana Attakora	None	Out of contract	November 22, 2013	
13	GK	(United States) Evan Newton	None	Out of contract	November 22, 2013	
-	FW	(Peru) César Díaz Pizarro	None	Out of contract	November 22, 2013	
19	DF	(Republic of Ireland) Peter McGlynn	None	Out of contract	November 22, 2013	
20	FW	(United States) Marcus Tracy	None	Out of contract	November 22, 2013	
11	MF	(Morocco) Mehdi Ballouchy	None	Out of contract	December 9, 2013	
