= List of Chivas USA managers =

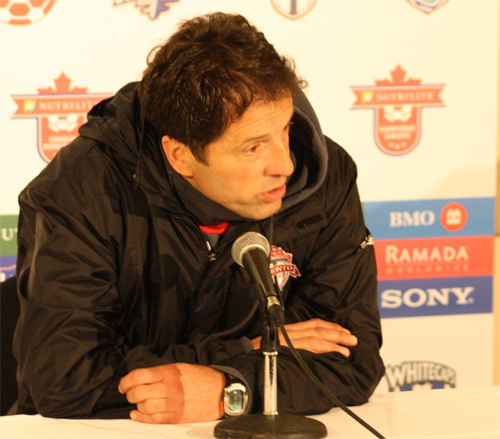
Preki was the longest-serving manager of Chivas USA, having served from 2007 to 2009, as well as serving as assistant coach in the 2006 season.

Chivas USA was a soccer team based in Carson, California, that competed in Major League Soccer (MLS) from 2005 until 2014, after which the team folded. The club shared ownership with Mexican club C.D. Guadalajara. Chivas USA employed nine different managers, in addition to two interim managers. The longest-serving manager was Preki, who took charge of 96 league and playoff matches, with a 41.67% win rate. The club reached the playoffs in all three seasons that he led the team. The next-most successful manager was Bob Bradley, who took charge of 34 matches with a 32.35% win rate before being hired by the U.S. men's national team. The shortest-serving manager was Thomas Rongen, who took charge of ten matches in the club's inaugural season.

== Managerial history ==
=== Inaugural season (2005) ===
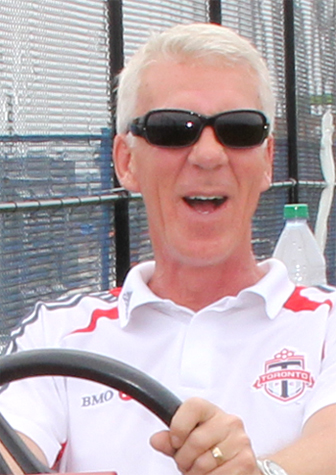
Thomas Rongen was the first manager of Chivas USA, but was moved to a different role in the club after ten games.

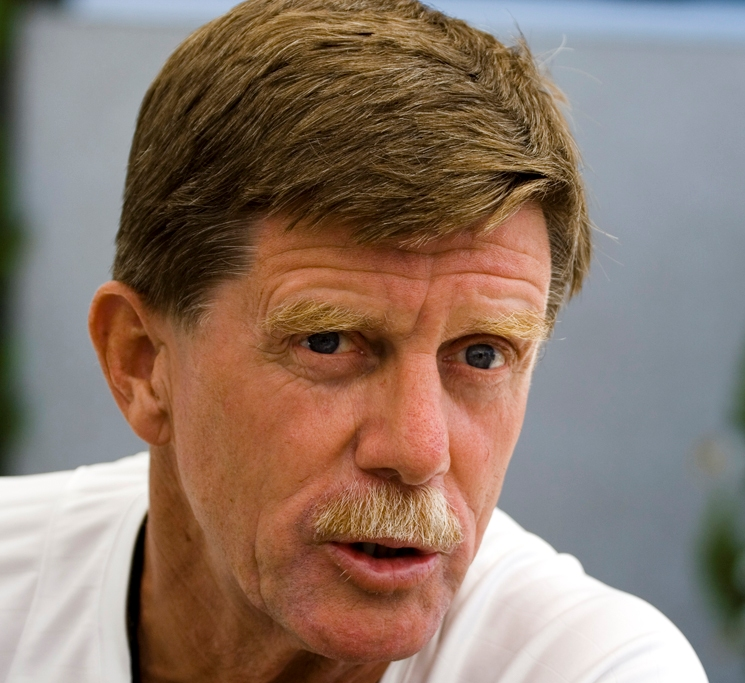
Hans Westerhof managed Chivas USA from June 2005 until the end of the season.

Chivas USA introduced their first head coach Thomas Rongen at a press conference on September 23, 2004. Rongen had previously coached the Tampa Bay Mutiny, New England Revolution, D.C. United, and the US men's under-20 team. His hiring was met with criticism as he did not speak fluent Spanish, even though the club was trying to reach a Spanish-speaking market. Rongen's tenure lasted only 10 games and, with the team at a 1–8–1 record, he became the club's sporting director. Assistant coach Javier Ledesma, a former goalkeeper for C.D. Guadalajara and the Mexico national soccer team, replaced him as the interim manager. The club announced Hans Westerhof, the director of football for C.D. Guadalajara and Deportivo Saprissa, as the new head coach on June 3. Westerhof's stint with the club was disappointing, with only three wins, but at the end of the season he announced he would be returning for the next season. He was nevertheless dismissed from the club within a month, but was hired as the manager of C.D. Guadalajara a week after his dismissal from the MLS side.

=== Success under Bradley and Preki (2006–2009) ===
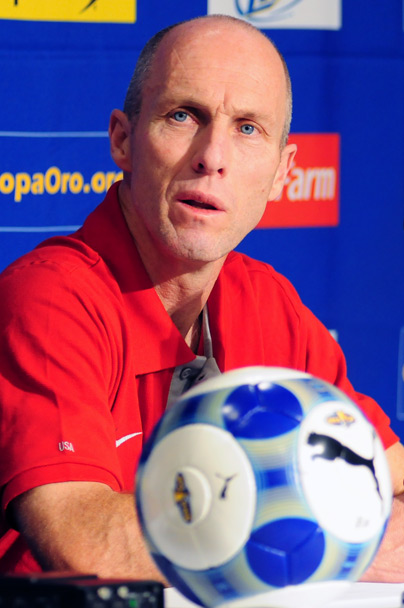
Bob Bradley was the head coach for Chivas USA in 2006, before departing the club for the U.S. men's national team.

On November 22, 2005, the club announced the hiring of American coach Bob Bradley. Bradley held the record for most wins of any MLS coach in league history, with stints at the Chicago Fire and NY/NJ Metrostars. The club's season under Bradley was more successful than its first, with an 11–10–13 record including the club's first playoff appearance. At the end of the year, Bradley was awarded MLS Coach of the Year. Bradley was hired as the interim manager of the U.S. Men's national team and stepped down from his post.

The club's next hiring was Preki, a former player for the U.S. Men's national team who had served as an assistant coach under Bradley the previous season. Like Bradley, Preki was awarded MLS Coach of the Year in his first season. During his tenure, the club reached the playoffs for three consecutive seasons, losing in the first round each time. At the end of the 2009 season, he departed the club having amassed a 40–32–24 record.

=== Decline and club dissolution (2009–2014) ===
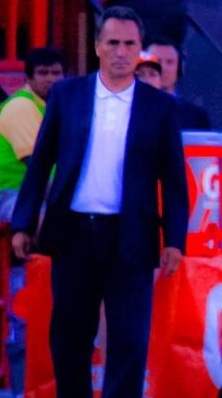
José Luis Real managed the club for six months at the end of the 2013 season.

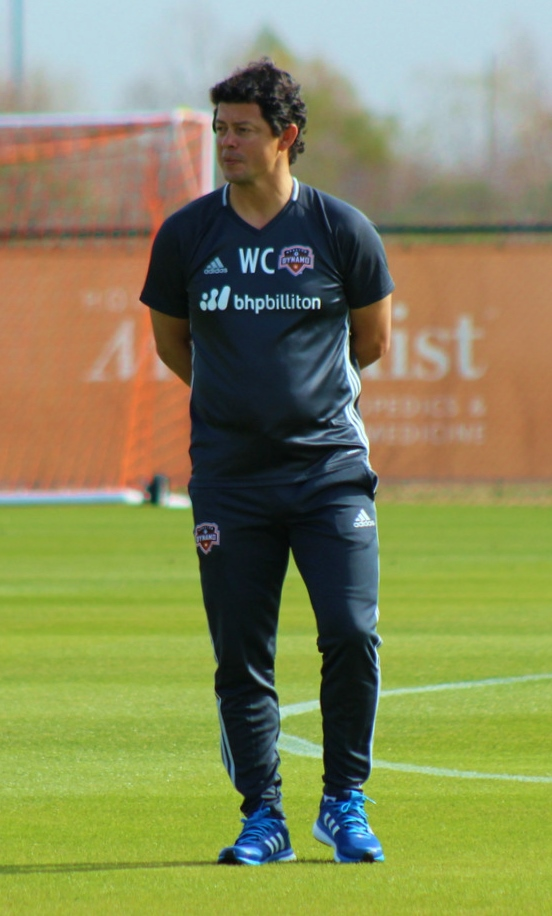
Wílmer Cabrera managed the club in the 2014 season.

The club hired Martín Vásquez on December 2, 2009. Vasquez had been an assistant coach at C.D. Guadalajara, and was the only player to that point to play for both the U.S. and Mexican national soccer teams. Vasquez lasted one season and was fired after leading the team to an 8–18–4 record. Before the club hired its next coach, both Shawn Hunter (the chief executive) and Stephen Hamilton (the vice president of soccer operations) departed the club. On January 4, 2011, Real Salt Lake assistant Robin Fraser was announced as the sixth head coach of the club. Fraser was fired at the end of the 2012 season, with the team in last place in the Western Conference.

On December 12, 2012, the club announced the hiring of Jose Luis Sanchez Sola, known as Chelís, a former Primera Division manager. Chelís was fired halfway through the season with a 3–7–2 record, a day after former coaches Ted Chronopoulos and Dan Calichman filed a lawsuit against the club alleging that they were fired for not being Latino. The team put out a statement after the firing, saying that "While serving as Chivas USA head coach, Sanchez Sola not always followed [sic] the patterns of respect and conduct implemented by Major League Soccer, as well as by Chivas USA." José Luis Real was announced as the next head coach, with Sacha van der Most taking over as interim for a single match before Real arrived. Real led the team to a 3–6–12 record and on November 25, 2013, the club announced that he would take over as manager of C.D. Guadalajara.

On January 9, 2014, Wílmer Cabrera was announced as the head coach for the club. In February of that year, the league purchased the club for $70 million from owner Jorge Vergara. By the end of the season, the club's average attendance hit an all-time MLS low of 7,063. On October 26, 2014, the club played its last match, ceasing operations the next day. Cabrera ended his time at the club with a 9–16–6 record.

== List of managers ==
Key

- Names of interim managers are highlighted in italics and marked with an asterisk (*).
- Match results contain all league games and MLS playoff matches.

List of Chivas USA managers
Name	Nationality	From	To	Matches	Won	Lost	Drawn	Win % (Note: Win % is rounded to two decimal places.)
Thomas Rongen	Netherlands	September 23, 2004	May 30, 2005	10	1	8	1	10.00
Javier Ledesma*	Mexico	May 30, 2005	June 3, 2005	1	0	0	1	0.00
Hans Westerhof	Netherlands	June 3, 2005	November 21, 2005	21	3	14	4	14.29
Bob Bradley	United States	November 22, 2005	December 8, 2006	34	11	10	13	32.35
Preki	United States	January 17, 2007	November 12, 2009	96	40	32	24	41.67
Martín Vásquez	Mexico	December 2, 2009	October 27, 2010	30	8	18	4	26.67
Robin Fraser	United States	January 4, 2011	November 9, 2012	68	15	32	21	22.06
Chelís	Mexico	December 12, 2012	May 29, 2013	12	3	7	2	25.00
Sacha van der Most*	Netherlands	May 30, 2013	June 1, 2013 (Note: José Luis Real was announced as the new head coach on May 29, 2013, but Sacha van der Most took charge of the team's June 1 fixture against Seattle Sounders FC.)	1	0	1	0	0.00
José Luis Real	Mexico	May 29, 2013	November 25, 2013	21	3	12	6	14.29
Wílmer Cabrera	Colombia	January 9, 2014	October 27, 2014	34	9	19	6	26.47

== See also ==
- List of Major League Soccer head coaches
