= Iraheta =

Iraheta is a Spanish surname of Basque origins, most commonly found in El Salvador. Notable people with the name include:

- Allison Iraheta (born 1992), American singer who placed 4th on season 8 of American Idol
- Marvin Iraheta (born 1992), Salvadoran football midfielder
- Wilfredo Iraheta (born 1967), Salvadoran football defender
- William Renderos Iraheta (born 1971), Salvadoran footballer
- Roberto Iraheta (born 1960), Salvadorian-Canadian Editor & Publisher of El Independiente Canadian Newspaper, Radio Acción, Microfono Callejero & Factory News. Descendant of the Sephardic Basque Jews.
