= Hans Westerhof =

Dutch football coach (born 1948)

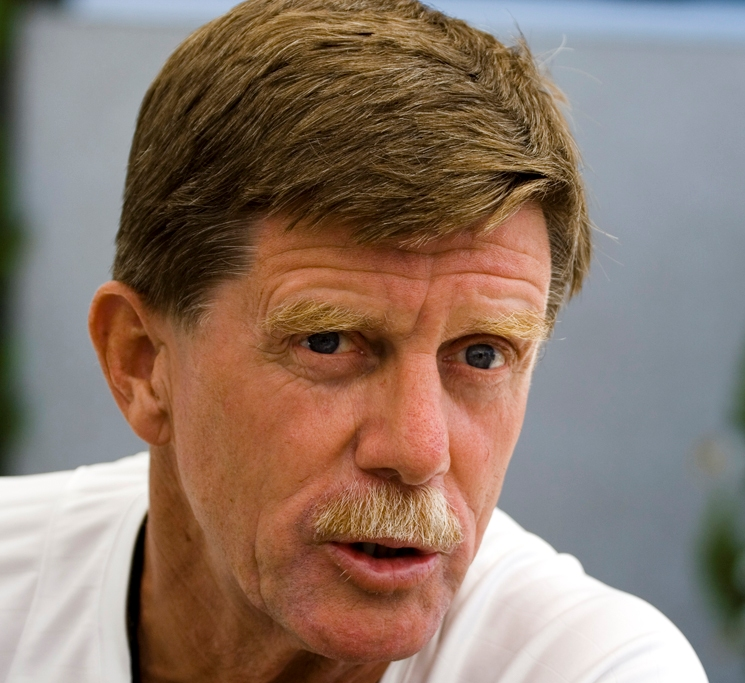
- Westerhof in 2007

Personal information
- Full name: Johannes Antonius Westerhof
- Date of birth: 24 November 1948 (age 77)
- Place of birth: Terborg, Netherlands
- Position: Midfielder

Senior career*
Years	Team	Apps	(Gls)
- BV Veendam
- BVO Cambuur

Managerial career
- 1982–1985: ONS Sneek
- 1985–1988: ACV
- 1988–1992: Groningen
- 1992–1993: PSV Eindhoven
- 1994–1997: Groningen
- 2000: Ajax
- 2000–2002: Willem II
- 2003–2004: Guadalajara
- 2005: Chivas USA
- 2006: Guadalajara
- 2007–2008: Club Necaxa
- 2008: Vitesse
- 2011: Pachuca
- * Club domestic league appearances and goals

Hans Westerhof (born 24 November 1948) is a Dutch football coach and currently supervisory board member at Heerenveen. Besides the Netherlands, he has coached in the United States and Mexico.

As a player, Westerhof played for BV Veendam and BVO Cambuur of the Dutch First Division. He began his coaching career in 1982, and has managed ONS Sneek, ACV, Groningen (1988–92 and 1994–96), PSV Eindhoven (1992–1994), the Netherlands U21 national team (1996–97), Ajax (2000), Willem II (2000–03), Chivas de Guadalajara (2003–04) and Necaxa (2007–2008).

Westerhof originally joined Chivas de Guadalajara in 2003 as sporting director of the club's teams, but took over the dual role as head coach of the first team in October of that year. He stepped down as coach after the Clausura 2004 season. On 3 June 2005, while serving as sporting director, Guadalajara's "sister" team, Chivas USA, named Westerhof its head coach, after a disastrous start under Thomas Rongen. He was replaced after the season by Bob Bradley and then came back to the parent club as its head coach and sporting director.

Besides coaching, he has been a teacher in Heerenveen (the Netherlands) at the Central Institute for Sports Education (CIOS) for many years. For Apertura 2007, Westerhof was appointed new head coach of Necaxa of Mexico.

On 12 June 2008, Westerhof was appointed Vitesse's new coach. He remained there until his firing that December.
