= Martín Ponce =

Mexican footballer (born 1992)

Personal information
- Full name: Martín Aarón Ponce Camacho
- Date of birth: 30 June 1992 (age 34)
- Place of birth: Celaya, Guanajuato, Mexico
- Height: 1.72 m (5 ft 7 1/2 in)
- Position: Midfielder

Youth career
- Guadalajara

Senior career*
Years	Team	Apps	(Gls)
2013–2014	Guadalajara	0	(0)
2013	→ Chivas USA (loan)	5	(0)
2015–2016	U. de C.	23	(0)
2018	Real Zamora	2	(0)

International career
2009	Mexico U17	2	(0)
- * Club domestic league appearances and goals as of 29 January 2016

Martín Aarón Ponce Camacho (Note: In this Spanish name, the first or paternal surname is Ponce and the second or maternal family name is Camacho.) (born 30 June 1992) is a Mexican former professional footballer who last played as a midfielder for Real Zamora.

== Career ==
On 12 March 2013, Ponce made his professional debut with Chivas USA against the Portland Timbers in a 3–0 loss. He came on as a substitute for Marvin Iraheta in the 59th minute.
