= Juan Agudelo =

American soccer player (born 1992)

Juan Sebastian Agudelo
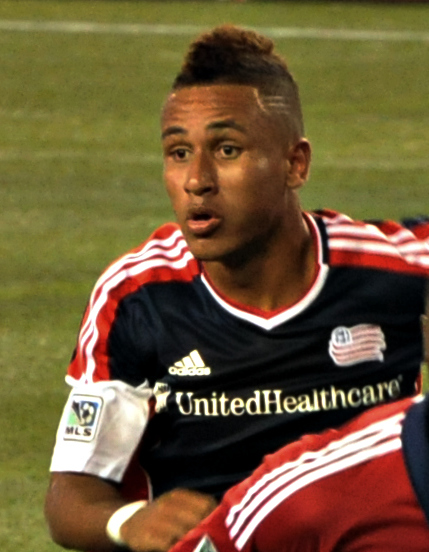

Personal information
- Full name: Juan Sebastian Agudelo
- Date of birth: November 23, 1992 (age 33)
- Place of birth: Manizales, Colombia
- Height: 6 ft 1 in (1.85 m)
- Position: Striker

Youth career
- NJSA 04
- 2007: PASCO Jr. Stallions
- 2007–2010: New York Red Bulls

Senior career*
Years	Team	Apps	(Gls)
2010–2012	New York Red Bulls	33	(6)
2012–2013	Chivas USA	26	(5)
2013	New England Revolution	14	(7)
2014	Stoke City	0	(0)
2014	→ FC Utrecht (loan)	14	(3)
2015–2019	New England Revolution	142	(28)
2020	Inter Miami CF	14	(3)
2021	Minnesota United FC	13	(0)
2022–2023	Birmingham Legion	62	(12)
2024–2025	San Antonio FC	49	(9)

International career^{‡}
2008–2009	United States U17	16	(12)
2010	United States U20	8	(2)
2012	United States U23	2	(2)
2010–2018	United States	28	(3)
Medal record
Representing United States
Runner-up	CONCACAF Gold Cup	2011
Winner	CONCACAF Gold Cup	2017
Men's Soccer
- * Club domestic league appearances and goals as of October 24, 2025 ‡ National team caps and goals as of January 28, 2018

Juan Sebastián Agudelo (born November 23, 1992) is a former professional soccer player who played as a striker. Born in Colombia, he played for the United States national team.

After moving from Colombia to New Jersey at an early age Agudelo began his career with the New York Red Bulls and made his Major League Soccer debut in October 2010. After scoring six goals in 2011 he was traded to Chivas USA in May 2012. Agudelo spent a year in California before he was traded to the New England Revolution in May 2013. He joined English side Stoke City in January 2014 but a failure to gain a UK work permit saw him loaned out to Dutch side FC Utrecht.

Internationally, Agudelo has represented the United States youth program at the Under-17, Under-20, and Under-23 levels. He made his debut for the senior national team against South Africa on November 17, 2010, scoring the only goal of the match.

== Early life ==
Agudelo moved with his family from Colombia to the New York area at the age of seven. He grew up and played soccer in Barnegat Township, New Jersey, before moving to Kinnelon, New Jersey to live with his godmother. He attended St. Benedict's Preparatory School for one year, in 2007.

== Club career ==
He's been impressive for a 17-year-old. He shows such power. He is something special. When you look at his technical skill, you can compare him with European forwards of the same age, in terms of individual skill.

— Red Bulls coach Hans Backe speaking about Juan Agudelo, March 17, 2010

=== New York Red Bulls ===
Agudelo began his career with the New York Red Bull Academy a member of the U.S. Soccer Development Academy and quickly established himself as one of the more skilled prospects at the club. In 2009, he was offered a chance to join the junior team but decided to accept a trial with Colombian side Millonarios in 2010. Although it was reported that he had signed with Millonarios, he returned to the United States to join Red Bulls during their pre-season. While with Millonarios, Agudelo played with the youth side, including a match against Independiente Santa Fe on January 17, which served as a tribute match to Brazilian great Pelé.

On March 26, 2010, Agudelo officially joined the New York Red Bulls. He made his professional debut on April 27, 2010, in a U.S. Open Cup game against Philadelphia Union. Agudelo made his MLS debut against Real Salt Lake October 9, 2010, entering in the 85th minute in a match that ended in a scoreless draw. He scored his first professional goal on March 19, 2011, in the Red Bulls' 2011 MLS season opener, a 1–0 victory over Seattle Sounders FC. In October, MLS listed Agudelo at no. 2 on its "24 under 24" list of best young players for 2011.

As directed by US National team manager Jürgen Klinsmann, that all off-season US MLS stars should train with European clubs, on November 16, 2011, Agudelo started a two-week training period with VfB Stuttgart. On December 1, 2011, Agudelo started a similar two-week period at Liverpool.

=== Chivas USA ===
Agudelo was traded to Chivas USA on May 17, 2012, in exchange for defender Heath Pearce, allocation money, and future considerations. The latter was reported to be a portion of any transfer fee that Chivas USA receives from selling Agudelo. Following the 2012 Major League Soccer season, Agudelo was invited to train with Scottish club Celtic. Following his training stint with Celtic, Agudelo joined West Ham United for a training stint also. He scored four goals for Chivas in 2012 as they had a poor campaign finishing bottom of the Western Conference. Agudelo was listed by MLS at no. 13 on MLS' annual "24 under 24" list of best young players. Agudelo began the 2013 well, scoring against FC Dallas and Chicago Fire before he was transferred to the New England Revolution on May 7, 2013.

=== New England Revolution ===
Agudelo was traded to New England Revolution in exchange for allocation money on May 7, 2013. Agudelo made his New England debut in a 2–0 win over Houston Dynamo and he was credited with their second goal which was originally given as an own goal. He then scored against Toronto FC and Vancouver Whitecaps FC before being ruled out for a month with a knee injury. In August 2013 Agudelo began to attract interest from English Premier League side Stoke City. Agudelo returned from injury on August 17, against Chicago Fire and scored a spectacular back-heel goal in a 2–0 victory. The strike was subsequently a finalist for MLS Goal of the Year. MLS listed Agudelo at no. 6 on its annual "24 under 24" list of best young players for the 2013 season.

=== Stoke City ===
On August 9, 2013, it was announced that Agudelo had signed a pre-contract agreement with English club Stoke City and will join the Potters on January 1, 2014, once his contract with the New England Revolution has expired. However the move fell through after he was denied a work permit. Despite this, Stoke completed the signing of Agudelo on January 21, 2014, and loaned him out to Dutch side FC Utrecht for the remainder of the 2013–14 season. He scored his first goal for Utrecht on February 6, 2014, scoring against PEC Zwolle in a 2–1 defeat. Stoke re-applied for a work permit for Agudelo in May 2014 but were again unsuccessful. Following this Juan Agudelo had the option to join a team in Germany, but decided to head back to the States and continue his career with the USMNT and New England Revolution, where he felt his best and at home.

=== Return to New England ===
On January 30, 2015, Agudelo re-signed with the New England Revolution after tweeting out "I am extremely happy to officially sign minutes ago and be back with the best teammates and coaching staff #NERevs". in the 2015 MLS Cup playoffs, he scored a "stunning" bicycle kick against D.C. United to give the Revolution a 1–0 lead. In October, MLS listed Agudelo at no. 13 in its "24 under 24" list of best young players for 2015.

In the 2016 season, Agudelo led the Revolution scoring, recording seven goals and five assists. He was listed as the 17th best young player on MLS' 2016 "24 under 24" list.

He recorded a career-high eight goals in the 2017 season, and was named MLS Player of the Week for MLS match week 4 after recording a brace against Minnesota United FC.

On December 3, 2019, Agudelo was selected by Toronto FC in Stage Two of the 2019 MLS Re-Entry Draft, however, they were not able to reach a contract agreement.

=== Inter Miami ===
Agudelo joined Inter Miami CF. Agudelo made his Miami debut in the club's first ever-match, a 1–0 loss to Los Angeles FC on March 1, 2020. He scored his first Miami goal on July 8 in the MLS is Back Tournament in a 2–1 loss to Orlando City SC, and notched two more goals and in 14 total appearances for the club during their inaugural campaign. Miami opted to decline his contract option following the 2020 season.

=== Minnesota United ===
On March 2, 2021, Agudelo signed as a free agent with Minnesota United FC on a one-year deal. He appeared 13 times for the club. .

=== Birmingham Legion ===
On March 31, 2022, Agudelo signed with second-tier side Birmingham Legion who play in the USL Championship, rejoining Tom Soehn and Jay Heaps, who had both coached him while in New England. Agudelo contributed seven goals and five assists in his first season in Birmingham, and the club re-signed him prior to the 2023 season. He was named U.S. Open Cup Lower Division Player of the Tournament for 2023, scoring three goals and recording a game-winning assist as the Legion reached the quarterfinals.

=== San Antonio FC ===
Agudelo moved to USL Championship side San Antonio FC on December 21, 2023, ahead of their upcoming 2024 season.

== International career ==
Agudelo represented the United States at the 2009 FIFA U-17 World Cup. In 2010, he also debuted for the United States Under-20 side. On January 23, 2010, he scored the equalizing goal for the United States Under-20 national team in a 1–1 draw with Brazil. On November 11, 2010, Agudelo was called up to the United States senior national side for the first time as part of an 18-man roster for a match against South Africa on November 17 in Cape Town. He made his debut for the team coming on against South Africa in the Nelson Mandela Challenge wearing the number 17 shirt. Agudelo scored the only goal of the game on a volley that went in off the underside of the crossbar. In doing so, he became the youngest player in national team history to score in a senior game. On January 22. 2011, Agudelo drew the penalty that led to the U.S. only goal of the match in a 1–1 draw against Chile. In an international friendly on March 26, 2011, he scored the equalizer in a 1–1 draw against Argentina.

== Style of play ==
Most of his key traits involve a precise style of dribbling and ball control. This has often resulted in him being fouled easily and winning free-kicks.

== Personal life ==
Juan Agudelo is married to Vanessa Agudelo. They have two daughters, Alina and Bella.

== Career statistics ==
=== Club ===
As of match played October 23, 2022

Club	Season	League			National cup		Playoffs		Continental		Total	
Club	Season	Division	Apps	Goals	Apps	Goals	Apps	Goals	Apps	Goals	Apps	Goals
New York Red Bulls	2010	MLS	2	0	1	0	2	0	0	0	7	0
New York Red Bulls	2011	MLS	27	6	1	0	1	0	0	0	29	6
New York Red Bulls	2012	MLS	3	0	1	0	0	0	0	0	4	0
New York Red Bulls	Total		32	6	3	0	3	0	0	0	38	6
Chivas USA	2012	MLS	21	3	2	1	0	0	0	0	23	4
Chivas USA	2013	MLS	6	2	0	0	0	0	0	0	6	2
Chivas USA	Total		27	5	2	1	0	0	0	0	29	6
New England Revolution	2013	MLS	14	4	2	0	2	1	0	0	18	5
Stoke City	2013–14	Premier League	–		–		–		–		0	0
FC Utrecht (loan)	2013–14	Eredivisie	14	3	0	0	0	0	0	0	14	3
New England Revolution	2015	MLS	32	7	1	0	1	1	0	0	34	8
New England Revolution	2016	MLS	24	7	3	2	0	0	0	0	27	9
New England Revolution	2017	MLS	28	8	0	0	0	0	0	0	28	8
New England Revolution	2018	MLS	30	3	1	0	0	0	0	0	31	3
New England Revolution	2019	MLS	28	3	2	1	1	0	0	0	31	4
New England Revolution	Total		142	28	7	3	2	1	0	0	151	32
Inter Miami CF	2020	MLS	14	3	0	0	0	0	0	0	14	3
Minnesota United FC	2021	MLS	13	0	0	0	0	0	0	0	13	0
Birmingham Legion	2022	USL Championship	28	7	2	0	1	0	0	0	31	7
Birmingham Legion	Total		28	7	2	0	1	0	0	0	31	7
Career total			274	56	16	4	8	1	0	0	308	61

=== International ===
As of January 29, 2018

National team	Year	Apps	Goals
United States
United States	2010	1	1
United States	2011	14	1
United States	2012	1	0
United States	2013	1	0
United States	2014	1	0
United States	2015	2	1
United States	2016	1	0
United States	2017	6	0
United States	2018	1	0
Total		28	3

==== International goals ====
Score and result list United States goal tally first.

No.	Date	Venue	Opponent	Score	Result	Competition	Ref.
1.	November 17, 2010	Cape Town Stadium, Cape Town, South Africa	South Africa	1–0	1–0	Friendly	
2.	March 27, 2011	New Meadowlands Stadium, East Rutherford, United States	Argentina	1–1	1–1	Friendly	
3.	April 16, 2015	Alamodome, San Antonio, United States	Mexico	2–0	2–0	Friendly	

== Honors ==
United States

- CONCACAF Gold Cup: 2017; runner-up 2011
