= Joaquín Velázquez =

Mexican footballer (born 1975)

Joaquín Velazquez
Personal information
- Full name: Oscar Joaquín Velázquez Elvira
- Date of birth: 11 September 1975 (age 51)
- Place of birth: Veracruz, Mexico
- Height: 1.82 m (6 ft 0 in)
- Position: Defender

Youth career
- 1992–1994: Puebla

Senior career*
Years	Team	Apps	(Gls)
1995–2010	Puebla	230	(5)
1997	→ Santos Laguna (loan)	14	(0)
2004–2005	→ Lobos BUAP (loan)	65	(3)
2007–2010	→ Veracruz (loan)	20	(1)
2013	Chivas USA	12	(1)
Total		341	(10)

Managerial career
- 2012: Correcaminos UAT (assistant)
- 2016: Coras (assistant)
- 2016–2019: Toluca (assistant)
- 2019–2020: Puebla (assistant)
- 2021–2022: Cruz Azul (assistant)
- 2022–2023: Peru (assistant)
- 2025: Puebla (assistant)
- * Club domestic league appearances and goals

Oscar Joaquín Velazquez Elvira (Note: In this Spanish name, the first or paternal surname is Velazquez and the second or maternal family name is Elvira.) (born 11 September 1975) is a Mexican former professional footballer who played as a defender.

== Early life ==
He was born in Veracruz, Mexico on 8 November 1975, his father Joaquín Velázquez senior was a massage therapist, for Veracruz. He would join Veracruz youth system as a child and would later go on to join the Puebla FC youth system in 1992 where he finished his development.

== Career ==
He made his professional debut with Puebla on 27 August 1995 in a 2–1 loss against Toros Neza. He spent two years with the club before being sent out on loan to Santos Laguna where he played 14 games before returning to Puebla where he played from 1998 to 2004. In 1999 with Puebla he experienced relegation for the first time and is still remembered by the clubs' fans for an emotional moment right after the referee ended the match that sealed the clubs' first relegation in more than 60 years. In 2004, he was sent on loan to the club's second division side BUAP where he played 65 games and scored three goals. In 2006 after Puebla's second relegation he rejoined the club and was key in helping the club return to the first division. In 2008 in a match against Pachuca he suffered a nose injury after smashing his face into an opponent's head right after scoring a goal. In 2010 after internal problems with the new owners he was sent on paid leave and wouldn't return to the club.

On 26 February 2013, Major League Soccer club Chivas USA announced they had signed Velázquez along with Peruvian defender Walter Vílchez, reuniting with their former coach at Puebla FC José Luis Sánchez Solá.

== Personal life ==
Around 7pm on April 12, 2022, Velázquez was arrested on the Anillo Periférico while on his way to Cruz Azul's second-leg match of the 2022 CONCACAF Champions League semi-final. The arrest was a result of a "judicial process initiated against him in 2018". The club released a statement the day after announcing Velázquez would no longer be with the institution.

== Honours ==
- Primera A (1) 2006–2007
- Promotion (1) 2007
