= Walter Vílchez =

Peruvian footballer (born 1982)

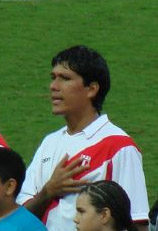
- Vílchez in 2007

Personal information
- Full name: Walter Ricardo Vílchez Soto
- Date of birth: 20 February 1982 (age 44)
- Place of birth: Chiclayo, Peru
- Height: 1.83 m (6 ft 0 in)
- Position: Centre-back

Youth career
- Alianza Lima

Senior career*
| Years | Team | Apps | (Gls) |
| 1999 | Virgen de Chapi | | |
| 2000 | Deportivo Wanka | 11 | (0) |
| 2001 | Unión Minas | 7 | (0) |
| 2002 | Sport Coopsol Trujillo | 8 | (0) |
| 2003–2004 | Alianza Lima | 68 | (5) |
| 2005 | Olimpo | 18 | (0) |
| 2005–2006 | Sporting Cristal | 62 | (16) |
| 2007–2009 | Cruz Azul | 17 | (0) |
| 2007–2009 | → Puebla (loan) | 56 | (0) |
| 2009 | Cienciano | 16 | (1) |
| 2010 | Alianza Lima | 33 | (1) |
| 2011–2012 | Sporting Cristal | 51 | (1) |
| 2013 | Chivas USA | 11 | (0) |
| 2014 | UTC | 30 | (1) |
| 2015 | Real Garcilaso | 23 | (1) |
| 2016 | Alianza Universidad | 17 | (0) |
| 2017 | Universidad César Vallejo | 16 | (0) |
| 2018 | Deportivo Coopsol | 19 | (0) |
| 2019 | Comerciantes Unidos | 0 | (0) |

International career
| 2001–2012 | Peru | 64 | (1) |

Managerial career
- 2023–2024: Necaxa (Assistant)
Medal record
Representing Peru
Association football
Copa América
| Bronze medal – third place | Argentina 2011 |
- * Club domestic league appearances and goals

Walter Ricardo Vílchez Soto (born 20 February 1982) is a Peruvian former professional footballer who played as a centre-back.

He made 64 appearances for the Peru national team.

He is the older brother of Óscar Vílchez.

== Club career ==
Vílchez made his league debut in the Torneo Descentralizado in the 2000 season playing for Deportivo Wanka. In the following two seasons he played for, successively, smaller clubs Unión Minas and Sport Coopsol Trujillo. In 2003, he joined top Peruvian club Alianza Lima, who were national champions in 2003 and 2004. In the first half of 2005 Vilchez played with Club Olimpo de Bahía Blanca (Argentina). In the second half of 2005 he returned to Peru to play for Sporting Cristal and won the 2005 league title.

In 2007, he went to Mexico to play for Club Deportivo Cruz Azul. He then went to Puebla F.C. on loan and became an important player for the club, remaining there until 2009. At the start of the following year, it became official, according to his representative, that Club Atlante attempted to sign him for one year. However, after several days training in Cancún, the club's president announced that his move would not be possible given that there were no more places for a foreign player on the team roster.

Vilchez returned to Peru in 2009, signing with Cienciano. After one year at the club he rejoined Alianza Lima. In 2011, he joined Sporting Cristal and helped the club capture a league title in 2012.

On 26 February 2013, Major League Soccer club Chivas USA announced they had signed Vílchez along with Mexican defender Joaquín Velázquez, reuniting with their former coach at Puebla F.C. José Luis Sánchez Solá. Vílchez and Chivas USA parted company on 26 July 2013.

Walter returned to Peru and joined the club UTC for the 2014 season

== Honours ==
Alianza Lima

- Torneo Descentralizado: 2003, 2004

Sporting Cristal

- Torneo Descentralizado: 2005, 2012

Peru

- Copa América bronze medal: 2011
