= Giovani Casillas =

Mexican footballer (born 1994)

Personal information
- Full name: Giovani Daniel Casillas Chávez
- Date of birth: 4 January 1994 (age 32)
- Place of birth: Guadalajara, Jalisco, Mexico
- Height: 1.77 m (5 ft 10 in)
- Position: Midfielder

Youth career
- 2010–2011: Guadalajara

Senior career*
Years	Team	Apps	(Gls)
2011–2016	Guadalajara	7	(0)
2013	→ Chivas USA (loan)	5	(1)
2014	→ Chiapas (loan)	2	(0)
2015	→ Coras (loan)	5	(0)
2016	→ Tampico Madero (loan)	13	(0)
2017–2018	La Piedad	37	(2)
2019	Real Zamora	4	(0)

International career^{‡}
2011	Mexico U17	7	(3)
Medal record
Representing Mexico
First place	FIFA U-17 World Cup	2011 Mexico
- * Club domestic league appearances and goals as of 23 July 2015 ‡ National team caps and goals as of 22 February 2013

Giovani Daniel Casillas Chávez (born 4 January 1994) is a former Mexican professional footballer who last played as a midfielder for Real Zamora. Casillas won the U17 World Cup in Mexico 2011.

== Club career ==
Growing up in the Club Deportivo Guadalajara youth system, Giovani Casillas made his first team debut during the 2011 World Football Challenge in a friendly against FC Barcelona, where he scored the third goal in a 4–1 win. He made his professional debut at the age of 17 on August 6, 2011, in a 0-0 Pumas-Chivas, entering in the 82nd minute for Jesús Sánchez. However, a knee injury sidelined him for the rest of the season. In 2012, he rejoined the first team, and made six appearances, including two as a starter. He also appeared in four Copa Libertadores 2012 matches.

On February 21, 2013, sister club Chivas USA announced they had acquired Giovani Casillas and teammates Mario de Luna and Edgar Mejia on loan from CD Guadalajara. He scored his first professional goal against FC Dallas on March 10, 2013, in a 3–1 win. The goal came in stoppage time in the 93rd minute on an assist from fellow Guadalajara loanee Edgar Mejia.

== International career ==
Casillas was a member of the Mexico U17 side that won the 2011 FIFA U-17 World Cup.

== Honours ==
Guadalajara

- Copa MX: Apertura 2015

Mexico U17

- FIFA U-17 World Cup: 2011
