= Carlo Chueca =

Peruvian footballer (born 1993)

Personal information
- Full name: Carlo Franco Chueca del Río
- Date of birth: 23 March 1993 (age 33)
- Place of birth: Lima, Peru
- Height: 1.73 m (5 ft 8 in)
- Position: Midfielder

Youth career
- 2005–2009: Chivas USA
- 2009–: Anderlecht

Senior career*
Years	Team	Apps	(Gls)
2011–2013	Mons	0	(0)
2013	Chivas USA	5	(0)
2014–2015	Ararat Yerevan	19	(3)
2019–	Estudiantes La Calera		
- * Club domestic league appearances and goals as of 27 October 2015

Carlo Franco Chueca del Río (born 23 March 1993) is a Peruvian footballer who last played for FC Ararat Yerevan of the Armenian Premier League.

== Career ==
In May 2009, while playing with Chivas USA U16, Carlo Chueca was detected by RSC Anderlecht. The Belgian club offered him a 2-year contract, and Chueca was integrated to the U21 team coached by ex-international star Johan Walem. During his first season with Anderlecht U21 he scored 2 goals in competition games and participated in the famous Viareggio Tournament in Italy. On April 21, 2010, at age 17, he made his debut with Anderlecht First Team: a friendly game vs. KVW Zaventem (1-1). In June 2011 Chueca was transferred to RAEC Mons of the Jupiler League, where he spent 2 years as a member of the professional roster. In the summer 2013 he was asked to go back to his former club, Chivas USA, and was officially signed on August 27, 2013. He made his professional debut in MLS on September 9, 2013 in a 1-0 victory vs. D.C. United, when he came on as a substitute for Carlos Alvarez at the 89th minute. During the 2013 MLS season he would play 5 games and deliver 1 assist against Real Salt Lake. By the beginning of the 2014 season, Chueca was released with several other players after Chivas USA announced that the franchise would stop and leave Major League Soccer.

Chueca joined FC Ararat Yerevan of the Armenian Premier League on a one-year contract in December 2014.

== Career statistics ==
As of 27 October 2015

Club performance			League		Cup		Continental		Total	
Season	Club	League	Apps	Goals	Apps	Goals	Apps	Goals	Apps	Goals
2013	Chivas USA	Major League Soccer	5	0	0	0	-		5	0
2014–15	Ararat Yerevan	Armenian Premier League	11	2	0	0	-		11	2
2015–16	Ararat Yerevan	Armenian Premier League	8	1	0	0	-		8	1
Total	Armenia		19	3	0	0	-	-	19	3
Career total			24	3	0	0	-	-	24	3
