= José Luis Real =

Mexican football manager (born 1952)

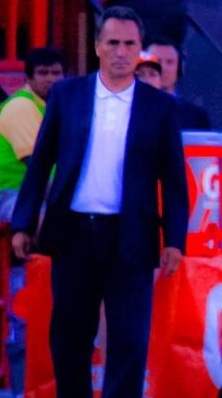

Personal information
- Full name: José Luis Real Casillas
- Date of birth: 6 June 1952 (age 74)
- Place of birth: Guadalajara, Mexico
- Position: Midfielder

Senior career*
Years	Team	Apps	(Gls)
1971–1980	Guadalajara		
1980–1985	Atlas	138	(2)

Managerial career
- 1990–1991: Atlas
- 1991–1997: Mexico U23
- 2004–2005: Dorados
- 2009–2011: Guadalajara
- 2013: Chivas USA
- 2013–2014: Guadalajara
- 2019: Toluca (caretaker)
- * Club domestic league appearances and goals

José Luis Real Casillas (born 6 June 1952) is a Mexican former professional footballer and sports development & youth academy director for Liga MX club Toluca.

== Career ==
Born in Guadalajara, Jalisco, Real played club football for C.D. Guadalajara and Atlas.

Real managed Chivas, leading the club to a runners-up finish in the 2010 Copa Libertadores.

On 29 May 2013, he was announced as Chivas USA's new head coach.

On 25 November 2013, he was announced to return to Club Guadalajara as head coach. After the season, he was let go.

The club offered him a new job but this time as the Director of Sports Development in Guadalajara's youth academy but he was once again let go in June 2014.

In October 2014, newly appointed Guadalajara president Néstor de la Torre hired Real as the new Technical-Tactical Coordinator for the youth academy. This is Real's third stint as a director in the club's youth academy.

In February 2019, Real was appointed as interim manager of Toluca after the destitution of Hernán Cristante.
