= Julio César Morales =

Professional footballer (born 1993)

Julio Morales
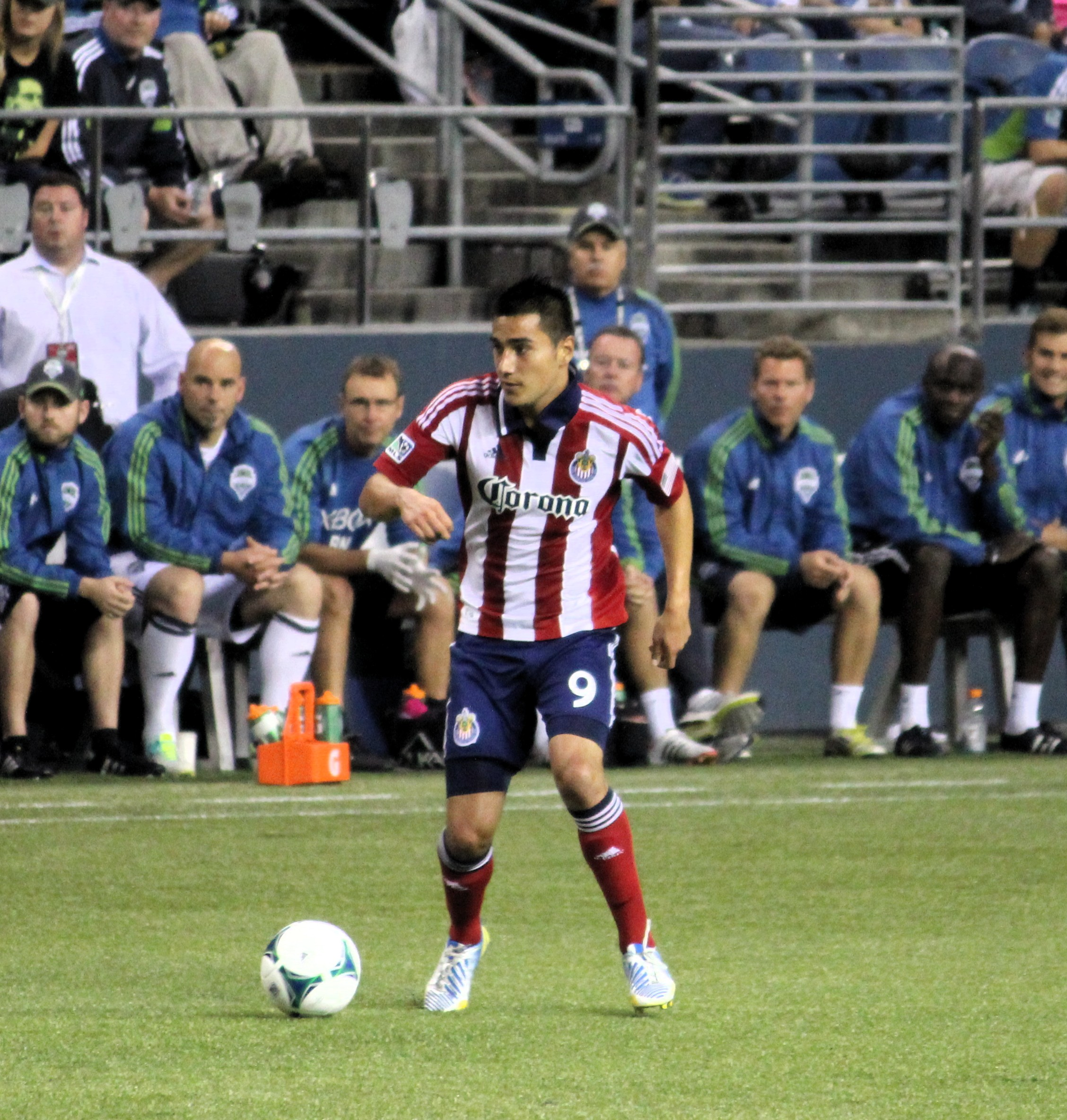
- Morales with Chivas USA in 2013

Personal information
- Full name: Julio César Morales Zavala
- Date of birth: 19 December 1993 (age 32)
- Place of birth: Glendale, California, United States
- Height: 1.80 m (5 ft 11 in)
- Position: Forward

Youth career
- 2004–2011: Sporting Santa Clara
- 2011–2013: Guadalajara

Senior career*
Years	Team	Apps	(Gls)
2013–2014	Guadalajara	0	(0)
2013	→ Chivas USA (loan)	17	(2)
2014–2015	→ Tepic (loan)	5	(0)
2016	Loros	15	(5)

International career^{‡}
2013	Mexico U20	4	(1)
- * Club domestic league appearances and goals as of 29 January 2016 ‡ National team caps and goals as of 30 May 2013

Julio César Morales Zavala (born 19 December 1993) is a former professional footballer who played as a forward. Born in the United States, he represented the Mexico national under-20 team.

== Career ==
=== Professional ===
Born in Glendale, California and raised in San Jose, Morales attended Willow Glen High School, where he also played soccer. He spent his youth soccer career playing for local soccer club, Santa Clara Sporting, where he gained interest from professional soccer clubs while winning multiple tournaments with the Santa Clara Sporting 93’ team. He scored a total of 78 goals at the high school level. Morales scored 17 goals in his first season as a freshman, 23 goals as a sophomore, and 38 goals in his final season at Willow Glen High School as a junior. He was named San Jose Mercury News Player of the Year, MVP of the Blossom Valley League, and named to the First Team Blossom Valley League during his high school soccer career. He led Willow Glen High School to their first Central Coast Section Division II Final appearance in 2010, and won their first ever Central Coast Section Division II championship in 2011. Days after the championship, Morales departed from Willow Glen High School to pursue a professional soccer career when he was recruited by Chivas de Guadalajara. Morales was noticed by Chivas when he participated in Alianza de Futbol ‘Sueno de tu vida.’ He was offered an opportunity to finish his high school education in Guadalajara and play for Chivas’ Under-17 development team in 2011. Morales joined Chivas USA on loan from Guadalajara on March 1, 2013, and made his professional debut a day later in a 3–0 home loss to the Columbus Crew. After 2 years training with Chivas de Guadalajara development teams and debuting with Chivas USA first team, Morales was called up to Mexico's Under-20 World Cup team while he was on loan with Chivas USA in 2013.

=== International ===
Morales is eligible to play for both the United States and Mexico. He made a couple of appearances in unofficial friendly matches for the Mexico U-20 national team during their trip to California in November 2012 including on November 17 when he recorded a hat-trick in a 9–0 win over a Riverside County all-star team. In 2015, he was among the 28 players called by Klinsmann to the United States January training camp, but he never played a match.
