= José Manuel Rivera =

Mexican footballer (born 1986)

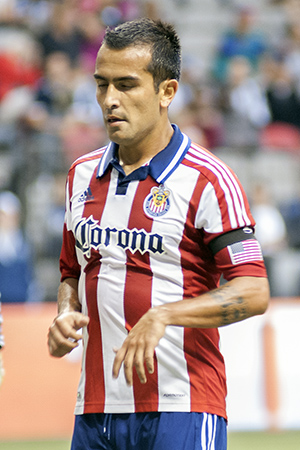
- Rivera with Chivas USA in 2013

Personal information
- Full name: José Manuel Rivera Galván
- Date of birth: 16 June 1986 (age 40)
- Place of birth: Guadalajara, Jalisco, Mexico
- Height: 1.77 m (5 ft 10 in)
- Positions: Midfielder; forward

Youth career
- 2005: Club Atlas

Senior career*
Years	Team	Apps	(Gls)
2005–2006	Pachuca	0	(0)
2006	Spartak Trnava	4	(1)
2007–2009	Budapest Honvéd	3	(1)
2007	→ Jaguares (loan)	8	(0)
2008	→ Toluca (loan)	0	(0)
2009–2010	Deportivo Guamúchil	33	(7)
2011–2012	RoPS	48	(17)
2013	Chivas USA	9	(0)
2014–2015	Irapuato	12	(2)
2015–2016	FF Jaro	28	(4)
2016–2017	Arizona	16	(10)
2017	Venados	1	(0)
2018	Sonsonate		
- * Club domestic league appearances and goals

José Manuel Rivera Galván (born 16 June 1986) is a Mexican former professional footballer who has played in six countries at the highest level in Finland, Hungary and Slovakia, Mexico, United States and El Salvador with Sonsonate FC his last team in 2018.

== Career ==
Rivera spent time in the youth league teams of Club Atlas and C.F. Pachuca. He signed with Spartak Trnava in August 2006 as a free agent.

For the 2007 season he played for Chiapas of the Mexican Primera División on loan. The following season, he played on another loan with Club Toluca in the Primera División. In the summer of 2009 he signed with Deportivo Guamúchil in Mexico.

=== RoPS ===
On 4 April 2011, Rivera signed a contract with Finnish club Rovaniemen Palloseura after have pass a time with Deportivo Guamúchil. Rivera debuted with RoPS on 6 May in a 1–0 win against FF Jaro and on 9 May he scored his first 2 goals in a draw 3–3 against IFK Mariehamn. Rivera have tried to get contract from Scandinavia and might be back in Rovaniemi 2012.

=== CD Guadalajara ===
Jose Manuel Rivera joined C.D. Guadalajara for the 2013 Clausura. He joined after he tried out a few weeks ago and played in the winter 2012 preseason for Guadalajara. He also tried out in September 2012, but did not end up playing.

=== Chivas USA ===
He spent the 2013 season with Chivas USA in Major League Soccer.

=== FF Jaro ===
After a short spell with CD Irapuato in the Ascenso MX, Rivera returned to the Finnish top flight, signing a contract with FF Jaro in April 2015. He made his debut on 23 April in a defeat against Seinäjoen Jalkapallokerho.

== Career statistics ==
Appearances and goals by club, season and competition
Club	Season	League			National cup (Note: Includes Finnish Cup, U.S. Open Cup.)		League cup (Note: Includes Finnish League Cup.)		Continental		Total	
Club	Season	Division	Apps	Goals	Apps	Goals	Apps	Goals	Apps	Goals	Apps	Goals
RoPS	2011	Veikkausliiga	26	10							26	10
RoPS	2012	Ykkönen	22	7							22	7
RoPS	Total		48	17	0	0	0	0	0	0	48	17
2013	Chivas USA	MLS	9	0							9	0
Career total			57	17								
