= Dan Kennedy (soccer) =

American soccer player (born 1982)

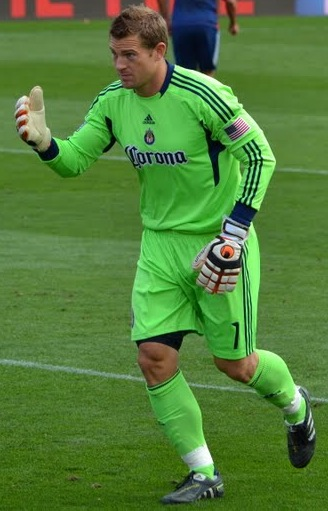
- Kennedy with Chivas USA in 2011

Personal information
- Full name: Daniel Hoffard Kennedy
- Date of birth: July 22, 1982 (age 44)
- Place of birth: Fullerton, California, United States
- Height: 6 ft 1 in (1.85 m)
- Position: Goalkeeper

Youth career
- El Dorado High School

College career
Years	Team	Apps	(Gls)
2001–2004	UC Santa Barbara Gauchos	84	(0)

Senior career*
Years	Team	Apps	(Gls)
2003–2004	Orange County Blue Star	21	(0)
2005	MetroStars	0	(0)
2005–2006	Puerto Rico Islanders	55	(0)
2007–2008	Municipal Iquique	34	(0)
2008–2014	Chivas USA	144	(0)
2015	FC Dallas	16	(0)
2016–2017	LA Galaxy	3	(0)
2016	→ LA Galaxy II (loan)	2	(0)
Total		275	(0)
- * Club domestic league appearances and goals

Daniel Hoffard Kennedy (born July 22, 1982) is an American former professional soccer player who played as goalkeeper.

== Early life and education ==
Kennedy was born July 22, 1982, in Fullerton, California. He attended El Dorado High School in Placentia, California and played 3 years for the school's varsity soccer team.

He attended the University of California, Santa Barbara and was a student-athlete on the UC Santa Barbara Gauchos men's soccer team. As a member of the 2004 UCSB team, he participated in the championship match of the 2004 NCAA Division I Men's Soccer Championship but lost on penalty kicks. In his four-year career as a starter for UCSB, he appeared in 84 games.

== Career ==
=== Amateur ===
During his college years, Kennedy also played with Orange County Blue Star in the USL Premier Development League. He played alongside Jürgen Klinsmann, who played under a pseudonym, as well as UCSB teammate Tony Lochhead. In two seasons with the club, Kennedy appeared in 21 games.

=== Professional career ===
==== American start ====
Kennedy was drafted by C.D. Chivas USA in the 4th Round (38th overall) of the 2005 MLS Supplemental Draft out of UCSB. He was not kept on for the season, but joined MetroStars as a temporary backup due to injuries to their personnel.

==== Puerto Rico Islanders ====
He was signed by Hugo Maradona to play with USL First Division side Puerto Rico Islanders in April 2005. He played every minute for the Islanders in the 2005 United Soccer Leagues season en route to being named the 2005 USL First Division Rookie of the Year. He made 55 appearances in his two seasons with the club.

==== Municipal Iquique ====
Kennedy was under contract with Puerto Rico and was expected to return for the 2007 United Soccer Leagues season, but was transferred to Primera B de Chile side Municipal Iquique for the 2007 season. He immediately attracted attention for his play, with Club Universidad de Chile, Club Deportivo Universidad Católica, and Cobreloa all rumored to have been interested in him. Kennedy led the Primera B in goals against average for the 2007 season.

==== Chivas USA ====
In April 2008, Chivas USA re-acquired their former draft pick to understudy current starter Brad Guzan for the 2008 Major League Soccer season. Guzan, however, was transferred by Chivas to Aston Villa F.C. in July with head coach Preki bringing in veteran Zach Thornton as the number one. A torn hamstring ruled Thornton out for weeks, thrusting Kennedy into the starting role.

With the starting goalkeeper undecided between Thornton and Kennedy ahead of the 2009 Major League Soccer season, a preseason knee injury suffered by Kennedy knocked him out of contention. Rehabilitation on the knee failed and Kennedy underwent reconstructive surgery to his posterior cruciate ligament in June 2009, washing out his entire season.

Thornton remained Chivas USA's starter for the majority of the 2010 Major League Soccer season, but early struggles by Thornton in the 2011 Major League Soccer season led to Kennedy being named the starter. He remained the starter for the rest of the season en route to being named the 2011 Chivas USA Most Valuable Player. December 2011 saw Kennedy sign a multi-year extension with Chivas USA.

Kennedy remained the starter until Chivas folded after the 2014 Major League Soccer season. He finished in second place for the 2012 MLS Goalkeeper of the Year Award despite Chivas USA's last-place finish and participated in the 2012 MLS All-Star Game. In May 2013, he signed a contract extension with Chivas and Major League Soccer through the 2016 season. Francisco Palencia, the Chivas technical director, said of Kennedy at the time of the signing, "He's our captain and our symbol at this moment, so we're very happy to extend this contract." Kennedy celebrated his new contract by scoring his first professional goal on May 28, 2013, on a penalty kick in the 2013 Lamar Hunt U.S. Open Cup against Los Angeles Blues.

Kennedy finished his Chivas USA career as the franchise's all-time leader in games played (144), games started (142), saves (451), and shutouts (28). Despite Chivas USA's demise, Kennedy's future was secure in Major League Soccer due to the extension he previously signed.

==== FC Dallas ====
After the contraction of Chivas USA, Kennedy was selected 1st overall in the 2014 MLS Dispersal Draft by FC Dallas. Despite making 16 appearances for Dallas, he became surplus to requirements when Jesse Gonzalez replaced him as a starter.

==== LA Galaxy ====
Following the 2015 Major League Soccer season, Kennedy was traded to LA Galaxy in exchange for two picks in the 2017 MLS SuperDraft.

On April 11, 2017, Kennedy announced his retirement from playing professional soccer.

== Awards and honors ==
Individual

- Major League Soccer All-Star: 2012
- USL First Division Rookie of the Year: 2005

Sporting positions
Preceded by Alejandro Moreno	Chivas USA captain 2013	Succeeded by Carlos Bocanegra
