= Mario de Luna =

Mexican footballer (born 1988)

Personal information
- Full name: Mario Humberto De Luna Saucedo
- Date of birth: 5 January 1988 (age 38)
- Place of birth: Aguascalientes, Mexico
- Height: 1.84 m (6 ft 1/2 in)
- Position: Centre-back

Senior career*
Years	Team	Apps	(Gls)
2008–2020	Guadalajara	76	(2)
2013	→ Chivas USA (loan)	30	(1)
2014–2015	→ Puebla (loan)	16	(1)
2016–2018	→ Necaxa (loan)	65	(1)
2019–2020	→ Atlético San Luis (loan)	13	(0)
2020–2021	Necaxa	22	(0)
2021–2022	UAT	25	(1)
2023	Municipal Grecia	8	(0)
- * Club domestic league appearances and goals as of 17 October 2023

Mario Humberto De Luna Saucedo (born 5 January 1988) is a Mexican professional footballer who plays as a centre-back.

== Club career ==
=== C.D. Guadalajara ===
A product of Chivas youth team, CD Tapatio, de Luna made his professional debut on November 9, 2008, against Puebla F.C. in the 2008 Apertura. At the 2009 Interliga de Luna replaced the injured Jonny Magallón performing brilliantly in the tournament, although he suffered an injury in the final. On September 6, 2009, he scored his first goal in the Primera División de México helping Chivas to a 2–2 draw against Puebla.

=== CD Chivas USA ===
On February 21, 2013, sister club Chivas USA announced they had acquired Mario de Luna and teammates Giovani Casillas and Edgar Mejia on loan from CD Guadalajara.

After pushing and verbally abusing a ball boy during a game against the Portland Timbers on May 12, 2013, de Luna earned a yellow card for "Foul and abusive language" directed towards a child.

== Honours ==
Necaxa

- Copa MX: Clausura 2018
