= Oswaldo Minda =

Ecuadorian footballer (born 1983)

Personal information
- Full name: Tilson Oswaldo Minda
- Date of birth: July 26, 1983 (age 43)
- Place of birth: Pasaje, Ecuador
- Height: 1.83 m (6 ft 0 in)
- Position: Midfielder

Senior career*
Years	Team	Apps	(Gls)
2000–2008	Aucas	122	(11)
2006	→ Deportivo Cuenca (loan)	20	(0)
2007	→ Emelec (loan)	2	(0)
2008–2011	Deportivo Quito	136	(10)
2012–2014	Chivas USA	58	(2)
2015–2018	Barcelona SC	71	(1)
Total		409	(24)

International career^{‡}
2008–2014	Ecuador	20	(0)
- * Club domestic league appearances and goals as of 12 July 2018 ‡ National team caps and goals as of 25 June 2014

Tilson Oswaldo Minda (born July 26, 1983) is an Ecuadorian former footballer who played as a midfielder.

== Club career ==
Oswaldo first started out at Sociedad Deportiva Aucas. He remained at the club for five years before joining Deportivo Cuenca. He was part of Deportivo Cuenca's campaign for the Copa Libertadores 2006. His impressive performances attracted the likes of Club Sport Emelec.

After Deportivo Cuenca, Oswaldo became the new high-profile signing for Emelec. He was part of Emelec's squad which participated in the 2007 Copa Libertadores. He did not get a starting position because of the many talented players on Emelec. As a result, he was sold to Deportivo Quito.

In Deportivo Quito, Oswaldo had a great first season. He played in the Copa Sudamericana 2008 where his team eventually fell to San Luis F.C. While with Quito he had a guaranteed starting position playing in central midfield. Minda formed a great partnership with Edwin Tenorio to help Deportivo Quito win the Ecuadorian Serie A 2008. Minda also helped Deportivo Quito win the Ecuadorian Serie A in December 2011. Days later he signed with Chivas USA of Major League Soccer.

On February 27, 2015, it was confirmed that Minda would be joining Barcelona SC for 2 years.

== International career ==
Minda made his international debut for Ecuador in 2008 and was most recently called up to represent Ecuador in the 2014 FIFA World Cup

== Honors ==
Deportivo Quito

- Serie A: 2008, 2009, 2011
