= Tristan Bowen =

American soccer player (born 1991)

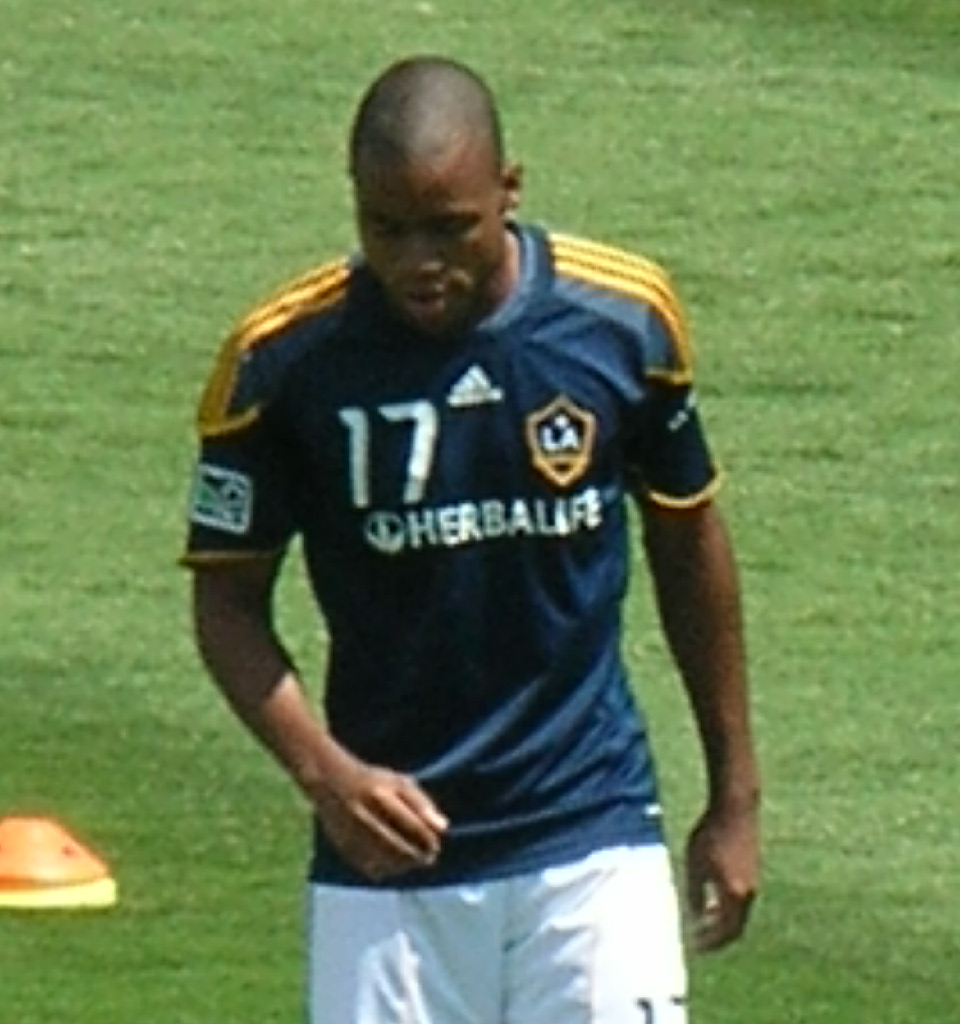
- Bowen with the LA Galaxy in 2010

Personal information
- Full name: Tristan Bowen
- Date of birth: January 30, 1991 (age 35)
- Place of birth: Los Angeles, California, U.S.
- Height: 5 ft 11 in (1.80 m)
- Position: Forward

Youth career
- 2007–2008: LA Galaxy

Senior career*
Years	Team	Apps	(Gls)
2007	San Fernando Valley Quakes	5	(0)
2009–2010	LA Galaxy	18	(2)
2009	→ Hollywood United Hitmen (loan)	1	(1)
2009	→ Miami FC (loan)	3	(0)
2011–2013	Chivas USA	30	(2)
2011–2012	→ Roeselare (loan)	24	(3)
2014	Seattle Sounders FC	2	(0)
2015	KuPS	12	(2)
2016	AFC United	16	(3)
2020	Oakland Roots	0	(0)
Total		129	(13)

International career^{‡}
2008	United States U18	2	(0)
2010	United States U20	1	(0)
- * Club domestic league appearances and goals as of February 5, 2017 ‡ National team caps and goals as of August 27, 2012

Tristan Bowen (born January 30, 1991) is an American former professional soccer player. Bowen was the first ever homegrown player in MLS history.

== Career ==
=== Youth ===
Bowen, who was homeschooled, forwent college although he was offered a scholarship to UCLA, and joined LA Galaxy's youth academy, Galaxy Rios, on March 15, 2007.

Bowen played for Galaxy Rios at the 2008 SUM U-17 Cup, and later helped the team win the Pacific Southern California Division of the USL Super-20 League.

=== Professional ===
Bowen played several games with Galaxy's reserves in the MLS Reserve Division towards the end of the 2008 season, and was formally signed by the senior LA Galaxy team on November 12, 2008, making him the first player in MLS history to be signed directly from his club's Youth Academy. He played during Galaxy's pre-season tour of Oceania in February 2009, and made his professional debut on April 7, 2009, in the Lamar Hunt U.S. Open Cup against Colorado Rapids. He made his MLS debut on June 20, 2009, in a game against San Jose Earthquakes.

With the MLS Reserve Division having been scrapped at the end of 2008, Galaxy also loaned Bowen to the Hollywood United Hitmen of the USL Premier Development League and to Miami FC of the USL First Division for part of the 2009 season, to maintain his match fitness levels.

Bowen was traded to city rivals Chivas USA on December 15, 2010, in exchange for allocation money and a split of any future foreign transfer fee received for the player.

On August 26, 2011, Chivas USA announced that Bowen had been loaned out to K.S.V. Roeselare of the Belgian Second Division. Bowen returned from his loan stint on May 17, 2012.

Bowen was traded to Seattle Sounders FC in exchange for Mauro Rosales on December 11, 2013.

The Sounders and Bowen part ways at the conclusion of the 2014 season. In December 2014, Bowen entered the 2014 MLS Re-Entry Draft and was selected in stage two by New England Revolution. He did not agree to terms with New England.

In August 2015, Bowen signed with KuPS in the Finnish Veikkausliiga.

In February 2016, Bowen signed with AFC United in Sweden. He helped the club win promotion to Allesvenska, Sweden's first division.

In January 2020, Bowen came out of a three-year retirement and signed with Oakland Roots SC ahead of the team's spring season in the National Independent Soccer Association.

=== International ===
Bowen has played for the United States U-18 and U-20 national teams, including three games in November 2008, during which he played friendly games against Spanish La Liga teams Real Madrid, Atlético Madrid and Rayo Vallecano. He is eligible to represent Jamaica through parentage.

== Honors ==
LA Galaxy

- Major League Soccer Supporter's Shield (1): 2010

Seattle Sounders FC

- U.S. Open Cup Champion (1): 2014
- Major League Soccer Supporter's Shield (1): 2014

AFC Eskilstuna

- Promotion to Allsvenskan (2016)
