= Édgar Mejía =

Mexican footballer (born 1988)

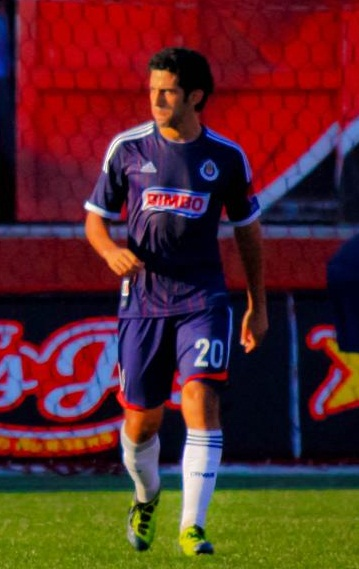
- Mejia playing for Guadalajara

Personal information
- Full name: Édgar Eduardo Mejía Viruete
- Date of birth: July 27, 1988 (age 38)
- Place of birth: Guadalajara, Jalisco, Mexico
- Height: 1.70 m (5 ft 7 in)
- Positions: Midfielder; right-back

Senior career*
Years	Team	Apps	(Gls)
2006–2012	Guadalajara	115	(0)
2012–2013	→ León (loan)	0	(0)
2013	→ Chivas USA (loan)	28	(1)
2014	→ Puebla (loan)	9	(0)
2015	→ Atlético San Luis (loan)	12	(0)
2015–2017	Juárez	47	(1)
2017–2018	Murciélagos	12	(0)
Total		214	(2)

Managerial career
- 2018–2020: Guadalajara Reserves and Academy
- 2020–2021: Guadalajara (women)
- 2026: Querétaro (women)
- * Club domestic league appearances and goals

Édgar Eduardo Mejía Viruete (Note: In this Spanish name, the first or paternal surname is Mejía and the second or maternal family name is Viruete.) (born 27 July 1988) also known as El Chore, is a Mexican former professional footballer and former manager of Liga MX Femenil club Guadalajara (women).

== Club career ==
=== Guadalajara ===
Mejía made his professional debut during the first week of the Clausura 2006 tournament against Toluca. From then on, Mejía became a regular with Chivas. During the Clausura 2007, he earned a starting position over Patricio Araujo. On June 1, 2012, he was transferred on loan for 1 year to Club León. However, he did not make any appearances for Leon during his time at the club. The versatile midfielder made 115 appearances for Chivas.

==== Loan at Chivas USA ====
On February 21, 2013, sister club Chivas USA announced they had acquired Mejía and teammates Giovani Casillas and Mario de Luna on loan from CD Guadalajara.

== Honours ==
Guadalajara

- Mexican Primera División: Apertura 2006
- Copa Libertadores runner-up: 2010

Juárez

- Ascenso MX: Apertura 2015
