= Marvin Iraheta =

Salvadoran footballer (born 1992)

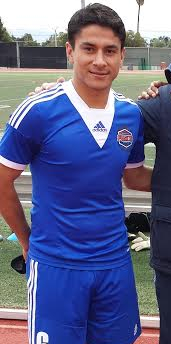

Personal information
- Full name: Marvin Iraheta
- Date of birth: May 31, 1992 (age 34)
- Place of birth: Sensuntepeque, El Salvador
- Height: 5 ft 10 in (1.78 m)
- Position: Midfielder

Youth career
- 2010–2011: New York Cosmos U-23

Senior career*
Years	Team	Apps	(Gls)
2012–2013	Chivas USA	13	(0)
2014	Alianza	7	(0)

International career
2008–2009	El Salvador U17	18	(4)
- * Club domestic league appearances and goals as of November 21, 2013

Marvin Iraheta (born May 31, 1992) is a Salvadoran international professional football player who plays for 1st division Salvadorian club Alianza FC.

== Career ==
=== Youth ===
Marvin Iraheta spent all of his early life in El Salvador before coming to the United States. Upon coming to the United States he established himself as one of the top young football talents in the United States. In less than three years in the US he was recognized with U-17/U-18 U.S. Soccer Development Academy National Player of the Year honors for 2009 and 2010. In 2010, he joined the New York Cosmos Academy and played for the Under-23 side and their first team. Marvin Iraheta has played for the El Salvador U17 and the United States U18.

=== NY Cosmos vs Manchester United ===
At age 18, Marvin Iraheta played for the NY Cosmos, alongside many of the world's best players like Fabio Cannavaro, Brad Friedel, Robbie Keane, and Patrick Vieira, in the Paul Scholes Tribute Match against Manchester United on August 5, 2011. His inclusion in the match was based on a recommendation by former Manchester United player Eric Cantona and Pelé who is the honorary president of the NY Cosmos. Marvin Iraheta wore the captain's armband for the NY Cosmos and marked Manchester United players Paul Scholes and Nani during the game that was held in front of 75,000 spectators at Old Trafford Stadium in Manchester, England.

=== Professional ===
At age 19, on January 24, 2012, Marvin Iraheta was signed by Major League Soccer team Chivas USA to a professional contract. Upon signing Marvin Iraheta, coach Robin Fraser talked about his new signing saying: “He's a kid who was the Development Academy's Player of the Year a couple years back, certainly highly sought-after, well-recognized for his achievements. He's a no-nonsense, hard-working midfielder, a battler and a true competitor.” Due to a pre-season torn ACL, he missed most of his first season to injury. He made his debut at the start of the 2013 MLS season against the Columbus Crew.

Having suffered through four coaching changes at Chivas USA he was released following the 2013 season and continued to train with the Chivas U-23 team.

In May 2014, he signed with 1st division Salvadoran team Alianza FC, which is one of the biggest and most successful teams in El Salvador and the first Salvadorian team to win the CONCACAF Champions Cup.

== Personal ==
Iraheta holds a U.S. green card which qualifies him as a domestic player for MLS roster purposes.
