= 2014 Chivas USA season =

Chivas USA
2014 season
- Owner: MLS
- Head coach: Wilmer Cabrera
- Stadium: StubHub Center
- MLS: Western Conference: 7th Overall: 16th
- MLS Cup Playoffs: Did not qualify
- U.S. Open Cup: Fourth round
- SuperClasico: Runners-up
- Desert Diamond Cup: Runners-up (1–3–0)
- Top goalscorer: League: Torres (14); All: Torres (16)
- Highest home attendance: 15,008 vs. LA Galaxy (April 6 MLS; Regular Season)
- Lowest home attendance: 3,702 vs. Portland Timbers (May 28 MLS; Regular Season)
- Average home league attendance: 3,467
Home colors	Away colors

The 2014 Chivas USA season was Chivas USA's tenth and final season in Major League Soccer, the top division for soccer in America.

Finishing seventh in the Western Conference, it was the club's first season since 2009 that they did not finish in last place in the Western Conference. However, the club failed to qualify for the MLS Cup Playoffs for a fifth-consecutive year. Outside of MLS play, Chivas reached the fourth round proper of the U.S. Open Cup, where they fell in penalties to the Carolina RailHawks of the second-division NASL. In the SuperClasico, Chivas finished as runners-up to inner-city rivals, LA Galaxy. The club's best performance in external competitions came in the preseason Desert Diamond Cup, where Chivas finished in second place.

Despite the poor production on the field, the bright spot on the club was young Mexican international Cubo Torres, who led the club in goals scored during the regular season, with fifteen. He finished seventh in the league in total MLS regular season goals for 2014.

== Transfers ==
=== In ===
Date	Number	Position	Player	Previous club	Fee/notes	Ref.
December 11, 2013	7	MF	(Argentina) Mauro Rosales	Seattle Sounders FC	Trade with Tristan Bowen	
December 12, 2013	16	DF	(United States) Andrew Jean-Baptiste	Portland Timbers	Trade with Jorge Villafaña and Re-Entry pick	
January 21, 2014	17	MF	(United States) Thomas McNamara	Clemson Tigers	SuperDraft 2nd round	
January 21, 2014	21	FW	(United States) Kris Tyrpak	Houston Baptist Huskies	SuperDraft 3rd round	
January 21, 2014	13	DF	(United States) Michael Nwiloh	Georgia State Panthers	SuperDraft 4th round	
January 22, 2014	4	DF	(New Zealand) Tony Lochhead	(New Zealand) Wellington Phoenix		
January 27, 2014	25	DF	(United States) Donny Toia	Phoenix FC		
February 19, 2014	8	MF	(Argentina) Agustín Pelletieri	(Argentina) Racing Club		
February 24, 2014	19	FW	(England) Luke Moore	(Turkey) Elazığspor		
February 28, 2014	22	DF	(United States) Eriq Zavaleta	Seattle Sounders FC	Loan	
March 3, 2014	6	DF	(Spain) Daniel Fragoso	(Spain) Hospitalet		
March 9, 2014	23	GK	(United States) Trevor Spangenberg	Springfield Synergy		
April 10, 2014	5	MF	(Argentina) Martín Rivero	(Argentina) Rosario Central		
April 17, 2014	6	MF	(United States) Matt Dunn	UMFK Bengals	Waiver Draft	
May 8, 2014	18	MF	(Honduras) Marvin Chávez	Colorado Rapids	Trade with Luke Moore	
May 8, 2014	19	FW	(United States) Ryan Finley	Columbus Crew	Trade for 2016 MLS SuperDraft pick	
June 24, 2014	14	DF	(Japan) Akira Kaji	(Japan) Gamba Osaka		
July 1, 2014	24	MF	(United States) Nathan Sturgis	Colorado Rapids	Trade with Carlos Alvarez	
August 14, 2014	20	FW	(Ecuador) Félix Borja	(Mexico) Pachuca	Loan	
August 21, 2014	7	MF	(England) Nigel Reo-Coker	Vancouver Whitecaps FC	Trade with Mauro Rosales	
August 22, 2014	34	DF	(Colombia) Jhon Hurtado	Chicago Fire	Trade for allocation money	

=== Out ===
Position:	Player	Transferred to	Details	Date	Source
DF	(Mexico) Mario de Luna	(Mexico) Guadalajara	Loan return	November 21, 2013	
DF	(United States) Jaime Frías Jr.	(Mexico) Guadalajara	Loan return	November 21, 2013	
DF	(Mexico) Edgar Mejía	(Mexico) Guadalajara	Loan return	November 21, 2013	
FW	(Mexico) Julio Morales	(Mexico) Guadalajara	Loan return	November 21, 2013	
GK	(United States) Patrick McLain	(United States) Orange County Blues	Contract option declined	November 21, 2013	
DF	(El Salvador) Steve Purdy	Free Agent	Contract option declined	November 21, 2013	
MF	(United States) Daniel Antúnez	(United States) Arizona United	Contract option declined	November 21, 2013	
MF	(El Salvador) Marvin Iraheta	(El Salvador) Alianza	Contract option declined	November 21, 2013	
MF	(United States) Josue Soto	(United States) San Antonio Scorpions	Contract option declined	November 21, 2013	
MF	(Mexico) José Manuel Rivera	(Mexico) Irapuato	Contract option declined	November 21, 2013	

== Roster ==
No.	Name	Nationality	Position	Date of birth (age)	Signed from	Signed in	Contract ends	Apps.	Goals
Goalkeepers
1	Dan Kennedy	(United States)	GK	July 22, 1982 (aged 32)	(Chile) Deportes Iquique	2008			
23	Trevor Spangenberg	(United States)	GK	April 21, 1991 (aged 23)	Springfield Synergy	2014		1	0
28	Tim Melia	(United States)	GK	May 15, 1986 (aged 28)	Real Salt Lake	2012		9	0
Defenders
2	Bobby Burling	(United States)	DF	October 15, 1984 (aged 30)	Montreal Impact	2012		75	1
3	Carlos Bocanegra	(United States)	DF	May 25, 1979 (aged 35)	(Scotland) Rangers	2013		30	0
4	Tony Lochhead	(New Zealand)	DF	January 12, 1982 (aged 32)	(New Zealand) Wellington Phoenix	2014		21	0
13	Michael Nwiloh	(United States)	DF	November 10, 1990 (aged 23)	Georgia State Panthers	2014		0	0
14	Akira Kaji	(Japan)	DF	January 13, 1980 (aged 34)	(Japan) Gamba Osaka	2014		15	0
16	Andrew Jean-Baptiste	(United States)	DF	June 16, 1992 (aged 22)	Portland Timbers	2014		10	0
22	Eriq Zavaleta	(United States)	DF	August 2, 1992 (aged 22)	Loan from Seattle Sounders FC	2014	2014	18	0
25	Donny Toia	(United States)	DF	May 28, 1992 (aged 22)	Phoenix FC	2014		28	2
34	Jhon Hurtado	(Colombia)	DF	May 16, 1984 (aged 30)	Chicago Fire	2014		6	0
Midfielders
5	Martín Rivero	(Argentina)	MF	November 13, 1989 (aged 24)	(Argentina) Rosario Central	2014		7	0
6	Matt Dunn	(United States)	MF	January 13, 1994 (aged 20)	(Serbia) OFK Beograd	2014		7	0
7	Nigel Reo-Coker	(England)	MF	May 14, 1984 (aged 30)	Vancouver Whitecaps FC	2014		9	0
8	Agustín Pelletieri	(Argentina)	MF	May 17, 1982 (aged 32)	(Argentina) Racing Club	2014		28	1
11	Leandro Barrera	(Argentina)	MF	February 22, 1991 (aged 23)	Loan from (Argentina) Argentinos Juniors	2014	2014	33	1
12	Marco Delgado	(United States)	MF	June 23, 1988 (aged 26)	Chivas USA Academy	2012		38	2
15	Eric Avila	(United States)	MF	November 24, 1987 (aged 26)	Toronto FC	2013		59	3
17	Thomas McNamara	(United States)	MF	February 6, 1991 (aged 23)	Jersey Express	2014		6	1
18	Marvin Chávez	(Honduras)	MF	November 3, 1983 (aged 30)	Colorado Rapids	2014		14	2
24	Nathan Sturgis	(United States)	MF	July 6, 1987 (aged 27)	Colorado Rapids	2014		16	0
30	Oswaldo Minda	(Ecuador)	MF	July 26, 1983 (aged 30)	(Ecuador) Deportivo Quito	2012		60	2
Forwards
9	Erick Torres	(Mexico)	FW	January 19, 1993 (aged 21)	Loan from (Mexico) Guadalajara	2013	2014	45	22
19	Ryan Finley	(United States)	FW	March 27, 1991 (aged 23)	Columbus Crew	2014		17	2
20	Félix Borja	(Ecuador)	FW	March 27, 1991 (aged 23)	Loan from (Mexico) Pachuca	2014	2014	12	3
21	Kris Tyrpak	(United States)	FW	March 19, 1992 (aged 22)	Austin Aztex	2014		10	1
42	Daniel Perez	(United States)	FW	May 30, 1996 (aged 18)	Chivas USA Academy	2011		0	0
Left Chivas USA
6	Daniel Fragoso	(Spain)	DF	March 31, 1982 (aged 32)	(Spain) Hospitalet	2014		2	0
7	Mauro Rosales	(Argentina)	MF	February 24, 1981 (aged 33)	Seattle Sounders FC	2014		21	0
10	Adolfo Bautista	(Mexico)	FW	May 15, 1979 (aged 35)	(Mexico) Atlético San Luis	2013		7	0
10	Luis Bolaños	(Ecuador)	FW	March 27, 1985 (aged 29)	Loan from (Ecuador) LDU Quito	2013	2013	3	0
19	Luke Moore	(England)	FW	February 13, 1986 (aged 28)	(Turkey) Elazığspor	2014		6	0
20	Carlos Alvarez	(United States)	MF	November 12, 1990 (aged 23)	Connecticut Huskies	2013		43	3
26	Matthew Fondy	(United States)	FW	July 28, 1989 (aged 25)	Los Angeles Blues	2013		8	0

=== Kits ===
Home	Home Alt.	Home Alt. 2	Away	Away Alt.	Away Alt. 2

Type	Shirt	Shorts	Socks	First appearance / Info
Home	Red / White	Navy	Red	
Home Alt.	Red / White	White	White	U.S. Open Cup, Fourth Round, June 15 against Carolina
Home Alt. 2	Red / White	White	Red	MLS, May 17 against Dallas
Away	Navy	Red	Navy	
Away Alt.	Navy	White	Navy	MLS, March 22 against Dallas
Away Alt. 2	Navy	White	White	MLS, September 7 against Columbus

== Friendlies ==
February 10, 2014 Scrimmage	Chivas USA	2–0	Orange County Blues FC	Carson, California
	McNamara 16'; Fondy 27'	Report		Stadium: StubHub Center Field 4

February 13, 2014 Scrimmage	Chivas USA	1–0	Real Salt Lake	Carson, California
	Bautista 11'	Report		Stadium: StubHub Center Field 4

February 16, 2014 Las Vegas ProSoccer Challenge	Chivas USA	2–1	Colorado Rapids	Whitney, Nevada
7:00 p.m. PST	Torres 19' (pen.); Bautista 82' (pen.)		Brown 16'	Stadium: Sam Boyd Stadium

February 19, 2014 Desert Diamond Cup	FC Tucson	1–1	Chivas USA	Tucson, Arizona
1:00 p.m. PST	Rapella 54'	Report	Alvarez 59'; Jean-Baptiste (yellow card) 90'	Stadium: Kino Stadium

February 22, 2014 Desert Diamond Cup	New England Revolution	2–3	Chivas USA	Tucson, Arizona
5:00 p.m. PST	Nguyen 11'; Bunbury 20'; Gonçalves (yellow card) 42'	Report	Torres 25'; Alvarez 54'; Rosales 74'; Burling (yellow card) 90+2'	Stadium: Kino Sports Complex

February 26, 2014 Desert Diamond Cup	Chivas USA	0–0	Colorado Rapids	Tucson, Arizona
12:00 p.m. PST	Borja (yellow card) 58'	Report	Sánchez (yellow card) 32'; Watts (yellow card) 45'	Stadium: Kino Sports Complex

March 1, 2014 Desert Diamond Cup	Chivas USA	1–1	Real Salt Lake	Tucson, Arizona
12:00 p.m. PST	Torres 10'; Minda (yellow card) 14'; Bautista (yellow card) 81'	Report	Saborío 70'	Stadium: Kino Sports Complex

March 10, 2014	Chivas USA	1–2	UCLA Bruins	Carson, California
3:00 p.m. PST				Stadium: StubHub Center Track Field

== Competitions ==
=== MLS ===
==== League table ====
Pos	Team	Pld	W	L	T	GF	GA	GD	Pts	Qualification
1	Seattle Sounders FC	34	20	10	4	65	50	+15	64	Qualification for the conference semifinals
2	LA Galaxy	34	17	7	10	69	37	+32	61	Qualification for the conference semifinals
3	Real Salt Lake	34	15	8	11	54	39	+15	56	Qualification for the conference semifinals
4	FC Dallas	34	16	12	6	55	45	+10	54	Qualification for the knockout round
5	Vancouver Whitecaps FC	34	12	8	14	42	40	+2	50	Qualification for the knockout round
6	Portland Timbers	34	12	9	13	61	52	+9	49	
7	Chivas USA	34	9	19	6	29	61	−32	33	
8	Colorado Rapids	34	8	18	8	43	62	−19	32	
9	San Jose Earthquakes	34	6	16	12	35	50	−15	30	

Source: MLS

Pos	Team	Pld	W	L	T	GF	GA	GD	Pts	Qualification
1	Seattle Sounders FC (S, U)	34	20	10	4	65	50	+15	64	Qualification for the CONCACAF Champions League
2	LA Galaxy (C)	34	17	7	10	69	37	+32	61	Qualification for the CONCACAF Champions League
3	D.C. United	34	17	9	8	52	37	+15	59	Qualification for the CONCACAF Champions League
4	Real Salt Lake	34	15	8	11	54	39	+15	56	Qualification for the CONCACAF Champions League
5	New England Revolution	34	17	13	4	51	46	+5	55	
6	FC Dallas	34	16	12	6	55	45	+10	54	
7	Columbus Crew	34	14	10	10	52	42	+10	52	
8	New York Red Bulls	34	13	10	11	55	50	+5	50	
9	Vancouver Whitecaps FC	34	12	8	14	42	40	+2	50	Qualification for the CONCACAF Champions League
10	Sporting Kansas City	34	14	13	7	48	41	+7	49	
11	Portland Timbers	34	12	9	13	61	52	+9	49	
12	Philadelphia Union	34	10	12	12	51	51	0	42	
13	Toronto FC	34	11	15	8	44	54	−10	41	
14	Houston Dynamo	34	11	17	6	39	58	−19	39	
15	Chicago Fire	34	6	10	18	41	51	−10	36	
16	Chivas USA	34	9	19	6	29	61	−32	33	
17	Colorado Rapids	34	8	18	8	43	62	−19	32	
18	San Jose Earthquakes	34	6	16	12	35	50	−15	30	
19	Montreal Impact (V)	34	6	18	10	38	58	−20	28	

Source: MLS
Rules for classification: 1) points; 2) head-to-head record; 3) goal difference; 4) number of goals scored
(C) MLS Cup champions; (S) Supporters' Shield winners; (U) U.S. Open Cup winners; (V) Canadian Championship winners

==== Results ====
March 9, 2014 MLS Regular Season	Chivas USA	3–2	Chicago Fire	Carson, California
3:00PM EDT	Burling (yellow card) 40' (goal) 88'; Torres 56' (pen.); McNamara 59'; Bocanegra (yellow card) 77'	Report	Segares (yellow card) 55'; Duka (yellow card) 61'; Joya 64' (yellow card) 78'; Amarikwa 70'	Stadium: StubHub Center; Attendance: 8,320; Referee: William Anderson

March 16, 2014 MLS Regular Season	Chivas USA	1–1	Vancouver Whitecaps FC	Carson, California
7:00PM EDT	Pelletieri (red card) 13'; Torres 45'; Minda (yellow card) 53'; Burling (yellow card) 57'	Report	O'Brien (yellow card) 17'; Laba (yellow card) 63'; Manneh 81'	Stadium: StubHub Center; Attendance: 6,684; Referee: Ramón Hernández

March 22, 2014 MLS Regular Season	FC Dallas	3–1	Chivas USA	Frisco, Texas
8:30PM EDT	Jacobson (yellow card) 38'; Castillo 71'; Watson 78'; Michel (yellow card) 84' (goal) 86'; Thomas (red card) 90'	Report	Lochhead (yellow card) 33'; Torres (yellow card) 34' (goal) 81'; Minda (yellow card) 42'; Delgado (yellow card) 85'; Tyrpak (yellow card) 87'	Stadium: Toyota Stadium; Attendance: 15,564; Referee: Fotis Bazakos

March 30, 2014 MLS Regular Season	New York Red Bulls	1–1	Chivas USA	Harrison, New Jersey
3:00PM EDT	Armando (yellow card) 21'; Luyindula 90+5'	Report	Torres 25'; Pelletieri (yellow card) 44'; Bautista (yellow card) 90'	Stadium: Red Bull Arena; Attendance: 15,225; Referee: Juan Guzman

April 6, 2014 MLS Regular Season	Chivas USA	0–3	LA Galaxy	Carson, California
3:00PM EDT	Torres (yellow card) 41'; Rosales (yellow card) 48'	Summary	Gargan (yellow card) 26'; Keane 37'; Ishizaki 41'; Husidić 56'	Stadium: StubHub Center; Attendance: 15,008; Referee: Drew Fischer

April 12, 2014 MLS Regular Season	Portland Timbers	1–1	Chivas USA	Portland, Oregon
10:30PM EDT	Johnson 7'; Harrington (yellow card) 39'; Chará (yellow card) 68'	Summary	Avila (yellow card) 67'; Torres 79'; Alvarez (yellow card) 85'	Stadium: Providence Park; Attendance: 20,814; Referee: Baldomero Toledo

April 19, 2014 MLS Regular Season	Chivas USA	1–2	Seattle Sounders FC	Carson, California
10:30PM EDT	Torres 5' (pen.); Barrera (yellow card) 28'; Alvarez (yellow card) 71'; Delgado (red card) 73'; Toia (yellow card) 90+3'	Report	Neagle 24'; González (yellow card) 31'; Martins 81'	Stadium: StubHub Center; Attendance: 7,499; Referee: Ismail Elfath

April 26, 2014 MLS Regular Season	San Jose Earthquakes	1–0	Chivas USA	Santa Clara, California
10:30PM EDT	Stewart (yellow card) 7'; Gordon (yellow card) 17'; Cronin (yellow card) 22'; Djaló 66'	Report	Toia (yellow card) 27'; Minda (yellow card) 53'; Kennedy (red card) 77'	Stadium: Buck Shaw Stadium; Attendance: 10,525; Referee: Allen Chapman

May 3, 2014 MLS Regular Season	Chivas USA	1–4	Houston Dynamo	Carson, California
10:30PM EDT	Torres 7' (pen.); Minda (yellow card) 56'; Melia (red card) 67'; Alvarez (yellow card) 74'; Burling (yellow card) 83'	Report	Davis 12'; Barnes 32', 69' (pen.); Bruin 45+2'	Stadium: StubHub Center; Attendance: 6,082; Referee: Sorin Stoica

May 11, 2014 MLS Regular Season	Colorado Rapids	1–3	Chivas USA	Commerce City, Colorado
3:00PM EDT	LaBrocca (yellow card) 70'; Brown 90+3'	Summary	Torres 56'; Rivero (yellow card) 61'; Chávez 67', 76' (yellow card) 68'	Stadium: Dick's Sporting Goods Park; Attendance: 10,086; Referee: (United States) Fotis Bazakos

May 17, 2014 MLS Regular Season	FC Dallas	1–1	Chivas USA	Frisco, Texas
8:30PM EDT	Ulloa (yellow card) 76'; Castillo 83'	Summary	Delgado (yellow card) 43' (goal) 60'; Minda (yellow card) 89'; Kennedy (yellow card) 90+3'	Stadium: Toyota Stadium; Attendance: 15,039; Referee: (Canada) Drew Fischer

May 28, 2014 MLS Regular Season	Chivas USA	0–2	Portland Timbers	Carson, California
10:30PM EDT	Delgado (yellow card) 10'; Pelletieri (yellow card) 28'; Burling (red card) 84'; Alvarez (yellow card) 87'	Summary	O'Rourke (yellow card) 8'; Adi 65' 71'; McKenzie (yellow card) 90+3'	Stadium: StubHub Center; Attendance: 3,702; Referee: (United States) Edwin Jurisevic

May 31, 2014 MLS Regular Season	Chivas USA	0–3	Philadelphia Union	Carson, California
10:30PM EDT	Barrera (yellow card) 63'; Torres (yellow card) 64'; Avila (yellow card) 73'; Minda (red card) 84'	Summary	Casey 28' (pen.) 66'; Fabinho (yellow card) 65'; Maidana 76'	Stadium: StubHub Center; Attendance: 5,231; Referee: (United States) Allen Chapman

June 8, 2014 MLS Regular Season	LA Galaxy	1–1	Chivas USA	Carson, California
8:00PM EDT	Zardes 35'	Summary	Torres 20'	Stadium: StubHub Center; Attendance: 19,756; Referee: (United States) Jair Marrufo

June 28, 2014 MLS Regular Season	Chivas USA	1–0	Real Salt Lake	Carson, California
10:30PM EDT	Lochhead (yellow card) 19'; Torres 35'; Rosales (yellow card) 47'; Toia (yellow card) 50'	Summary	Mulholland (red card) 9'; Stertzer (yellow card) 72'	Stadium: StubHub Center; Attendance: 5,689; Referee: (United States) Kevin Stott

July 2, 2014 MLS Regular Season	San Jose Earthquakes	0–1	Chivas USA	Santa Clara, California
10:30PM EDT	Stewart (yellow card) 21'; Pierazzi (yellow card) 62'	Summary	Toia (yellow card) 42'; Torres 53'; Rosales (yellow card) 76'; Lochhead (yellow card) 88'; Burling (yellow card) 90+1'	Stadium: Buck Shaw Stadium; Attendance: 9,114; Referee: (United States) Ricardo Salazar

July 5, 2014 MLS Regular Season	Chivas USA	1–0	Montreal Impact	Carson, California
10:30PM EDT	Torres 90+4'	Summary	Ouimette (yellow card) 70'	Stadium: StubHub Center; Attendance: 4,201; Referee: (United States) Juan Guzmán

July 12, 2014 MLS Regular Season	Vancouver Whitecaps FC	1–3	Chivas USA	Vancouver, British Columbia
10:00PM EDT	Mitchell (yellow card) 2' (goal) 28'; Fernández (yellow card) 54'; Harvey (red card) 69'	Summary	Pelletieri 48'; Torres 81'; Delgado (yellow card) 89'; Barrera 90+4'	Stadium: BC Place; Attendance: 19,383; Referee: (United States) Armando Villarreal

July 20, 2014 MLS Regular Season	D.C. United	3–1	Chivas USA	Washington, D.C.
8:00PM EDT	Johnson 25' (pen.); Kitchen (yellow card) 31' (goal) 59'; Silva 70' (yellow card) 71'	Summary	Sturgis (yellow card) 50'; Torres 84' (pen.)	Stadium: RFK Stadium; Attendance: 13,732; Referee: (United States) Fotis Bazakos

July 26, 2014 MLS Regular Season	Colorado Rapids	3–0	Chivas USA	Commerce City, Colorado
9:00PM EDT	LaBrocca 16'; Moor 26'; Torres 74'	Summary	Sturgis (yellow card) 36'	Stadium: Dick's Sporting Goods Park; Attendance: 14,652; Referee: (United States) Jair Marrufo

August 3, 2014 MLS Regular Season	Chivas USA	0–1	FC Dallas	Carson, California
10:00PM EDT		Summary	Hedges (yellow card) 17'; Akindele 49'; Díaz (yellow card) 67'	Stadium: StubHub Center; Attendance: 3,951; Referee: (United States) Ricardo Salazar

August 9, 2014 MLS Regular Season	Portland Timbers	2–0	Chivas USA	Portland, Oregon
10:30PM EDT	Valeri 10' (yellow card) 51'; Wallace 40'; Ridgewell (yellow card) 90+2'	Report	Lochhead (yellow card) 12'; Minda (yellow card) 33'; Pelletieri (yellow card) 59'; Delgado (yellow card) 90+3'	Stadium: Providence Park; Attendance: 20,814; Referee: (Canada) Drew Fischer

August 16, 2014 MLS Regular Season	Chivas USA	0–0	Vancouver Whitecaps FC	Carson, California
10:30PM EDT	Pelletieri (yellow card) 49'; Rosales (yellow card) 79'	Summary	Laba (yellow card) 37'	Stadium: StubHub Center; Attendance: 4,215; Referee: (United States) Edwin Jurisevic

August 23, 2014 MLS Regular Season	New England Revolution	1–0	Chivas USA	Foxborough, Massachusetts
7:30PM EDT	Soares (yellow card) 48'; Nguyen 56'	Summary	Torres (yellow card) 15'; Lochhead (yellow card) 53'; Minda (yellow card) 70'	Stadium: Gillette Stadium; Attendance: 16,427

August 31, 2014 MLS Regular Season	Chivas USA	0–3	LA Galaxy	Carson, California
8:00PM EDT	Jean-Baptiste (yellow card) 23'; Torres (red card) 75'	Report	Husidić (yellow card) 35'; Zardes 41' 71'; Keane 68'	Stadium: StubHub Center; Attendance: 18,652; Referee: (United States) Ismail Elfath

September 3, 2014 MLS Regular Season	Chivas USA	2–4	Seattle Sounders FC	Carson, California
10:30PM EDT	Burling (yellow card) 49'; Delgado 51'; Finley 60' (pen.); Minda (yellow card) 72'	Report	Martins 11' 16'; Rose 38' 42'	Stadium: StubHub Center; Attendance: 4,021; Referee: (United States) Ted Unkel

September 7, 2014 MLS Regular Season	Columbus Crew	3–0	Chivas USA	Columbus, Ohio
3:00PM EDT	Meram 52' 59'; Gehrig (yellow card) 69'; Añor 80'	Report	Jean-Baptiste (yellow card) 40'	Stadium: Columbus Crew Stadium; Attendance: 17,043; Referee: (Canada) Geoff Gamble

September 13, 2014 MLS Regular Season	Chivas USA	0–4	Sporting Kansas City	Carson, California
10:30PM EDT	Chávez (yellow card) 12'	Report	Dwyer 39'; Feilhaber 45+2'; Zusi 52'; Olum (yellow card) 67'; Lopez (yellow card) 67'; Bieler 87'	Stadium: StubHub Center; Attendance: 3,933; Referee: (United States) Juan Guzmán

September 21, 2014 MLS Regular Season	Toronto FC	3–0	Chivas USA	Toronto, Ontario
3:00PM EDT	Jackson 23' (red card) 67'; Moore 45+2'; Gilberto 54'; Lovitz (yellow card) 76'	Report	Sturgis (yellow card) 38'; Reo-Coker (red card) 67'	Stadium: BMO Field; Attendance: 22,591; Referee: (United States) Edwin Jurisevic

September 27, 2014 MLS Regular Season	Seattle Sounders FC	4-2	Chivas USA	Seattle, Washington
4:00PM EDT	Martins 14' 51'; Neagle 37'; Dempsey 45+1'	Summary	Torres 11'; Minda (yellow card) 13'; Anibaba 18' (o.g.); Burling (yellow card) 79'	Stadium: CenturyLink Field; Attendance: 38,713; Referee: (Canada) Drew Fischer

October 5, 2014 MLS Regular Season	Chivas USA	1-0	Real Salt Lake	Carson, California
7:00PM EDT	Minda (yellow card) 22'; Borja 47'; Sturgis (yellow card) 82'	Summary	Mulholland (yellow card) 78'; Morales (yellow card) 85'	Stadium: StubHub Center; Referee: (Canada) Dave Gantar

October 11, 2014 MLS Regular Season	Chivas USA	2-1	Colorado Rapids	Carson, California
10:30PM EDT	Zavaleta (yellow card) 24'; Minda (yellow card) 42'; Kaji (yellow card) 44'; Tyrpak 65'; Borja 85'; Lochhead (yellow card) 90+2'	Summary	José Mari (yellow card) 23'; Neeskens 30'	Stadium: StubHub Center; Attendance: 5,033; Referee: (United States) Chapman

October 22, 2014 MLS Regular Season	Real Salt Lake	2-0	Chivas USA	Sandy, Utah
9:30PM EDT	Saborío 36' (pen.); Salcedo (yellow card) 59'; Beckerman 74'; Grabavoy (yellow card) 85'	Report	Toia (yellow card) 31'; Burling (yellow card) 50'; Chávez (red card) 56'; Reo-Coker (yellow card) 76'	Stadium: Rio Tinto Stadium; Attendance: 20,665; Referee: (United States) Bazakos

October 26, 2014 Round 34	Chivas USA	1-0	San Jose Earthquakes	Carson, California
12:00 PM PDT	Borja 32'; Minda (yellow card) 51'	Summary	Bernárdez (yellow card) 66'	Stadium: StubHub Center; Attendance: 5571; Referee: (United States) Sorin Stoica

=== U.S. Open Cup ===
June 14, 2014 Fourth round	Carolina RailHawks	1–1 (a.e.t.) (3–2 p)	Chivas USA	Cary, North Carolina
15:00 PDT	Schilawski 29'; Ståhl (yellow card) 53'; Tobin (yellow card) 118'	Report	Finley 40'	Stadium: WakeMed Soccer Park; Attendance: 4,273; Referee: Mark Kadlecik
	Penalties
	Albadawi (penalty missed); Tobin (penalty scored); Low (penalty missed); Schilawki (penalty scored); Martínez (penalty missed); Aa.King (penalty missed); Jackson (penalty scored)		(penalty scored) Pelletieri; (penalty scored) Torres; (penalty missed) Zavaleta; (penalty missed) Kennedy; (penalty missed) Avila; (penalty missed) Tyrpak; (penalty missed) Delgado

== Squad statistics ==
As of match played October 26, 2014

=== Appearances and goals ===
No.	Pos	Nat	Player	Total		Major League Soccer		U.S. Open Cup	
No.	Pos	Nat	Player	Apps	Goals	Apps	Goals	Apps	Goals
1	GK	(United States) USA	Dan Kennedy	34	0	33	0	1	0
2	GK	(United States) USA	Bobby Burling	23	1	20+2	1	1	0
3	DF	(United States) USA	Carlos Bocanegra	18	0	18	0	0	0
4	DF	(New Zealand) NZL	Tony Lochhead	21	0	19+1	0	1	0
5	MF	(Argentina) ARG	Martín Rivero	8	0	6+1	0	0+1	0
6	MF	(United States) USA	Matt Dunn	7	0	4+3	0	0	0
7	MF	(England) ENG	Nigel Reo-Coker	9	0	9	0	0	0
8	MF	(Argentina) ARG	Agustín Pelletieri	28	1	22+5	1	1	0
9	FW	(Mexico) MEX	Erick Torres	30	15	29	15	0+1	0
11	MF	(Argentina) ARG	Leandro Barrera	33	1	24+8	1	1	0
12	MF	(United States) USA	Marco Delgado	21	2	12+8	2	1	0
14	DF	(Japan) JPN	Akira Kaji	15	0	14+1	0	0	0
15	MF	(United States) USA	Eric Avila	30	0	26+3	0	1	0
16	DF	(United States) USA	Andrew Jean-Baptiste	10	0	8+2	0	0	0
17	MF	(United States) USA	Thomas McNamara	6	1	6	1	0	0
18	MF	(Honduras) HON	Marvin Chávez	14	2	8+6	2	0	0
19	FW	(United States) USA	Ryan Finley	17	2	4+12	1	1	1
20	FW	(Ecuador) ECU	Félix Borja	12	3	12	3	0	0
21	FW	(United States) USA	Kris Tyrpak	10	1	0+9	1	0+1	0
22	DF	(United States) USA	Eriq Zavaleta	18	0	15+2	0	1	0
23	GK	(United States) USA	Trevor Spangenberg	1	0	0+1	0	0	0
24	MF	(United States) USA	Nathan Sturgis	16	0	9+7	0	0	0
25	GK	(United States) USA	Donny Toia	28	0	24+3	0	1	0
28	GK	(United States) USA	Tim Melia	1	0	0+1	0	0	0
30	MF	(Ecuador) ECU	Oswaldo Minda	20	0	20	0	0	0
34	DF	(Colombia) COL	Jhon Hurtado	6	0	5+1	0	0	0
42	FW	(United States) USA	Daniel Perez	2	0	0+2	0	0	0
Players who left Chivas USA during the season:
6	DF	(Spain) ESP	Daniel Fragoso	2	0	0+2	0	0	0
7	MF	(Argentina) ARG	Mauro Rosales	21	0	16+5	0	0	0
10	FW	(Mexico) MEX	Adolfo Bautista	7	0	1+6	0	0	0
10	FW	(Ecuador) ECU	Luis Bolaños	3	0	0+3	0	0	0
19	FW	(United States) USA	Luke Moore	6	0	2+4	0	0	0
20	MF	(United States) USA	Carlos Alvarez	11	0	7+4	0	0	0
26	FW	(United States) USA	Matthew Fondy	1	0	0+1	0	0	0

=== Goal scorers ===
Place	Position	Nation	Number	Name	MLS	U.S. Open Cup	Total
1	FW	(Mexico)	9	Erick Torres	15	0	15
2	FW	(Ecuador)	20	Félix Borja	3	0	3
3	MF	(United States)	12	Marco Delgado	2	0	2
3	MF	(Honduras)	18	Marvin Chávez	2	0	2
3	FW	(United States)	19	Ryan Finley	1	1	2
6	DF	(United States)	2	Bobby Burling	1	0	1
6	MF	(Argentina)	8	Agustín Pelletieri	1	0	1
6	MF	(United States)	17	Thomas McNamara	1	0	1
6	MF	(Argentina)	11	Leandro Barrera	1	0	1
6	FW	(United States)	21	Kris Tyrpak	1	0	1
6				Own goal	1	0	1
				TOTALS	29	1	30

=== Disciplinary record ===
Number	Nation	Position	Name	MLS			U.S. Open Cup			Total		
Number	Nation	Position	Name	Yellow card	(yellow card) (yellow-red card)	Red card	Yellow card	(yellow card) (yellow-red card)	Red card	Yellow card	(yellow card) (yellow-red card)	Red card
1	(United States)	GK	Dan Kennedy	1	0	1	0	0	0	1	0	1
2	(United States)	DF	Bobby Burling	7	0	1	0	0	0	7	0	1
3	(United States)	DF	Carlos Bocanegra	1	0	0	0	0	0	1	0	0
4	(New Zealand)	DF	Tony Lochhead	6	0	0	0	0	0	6	0	0
5	(Argentina)	MF	Martín Rivero	1	0	0	0	0	0	1	0	0
7	(Argentina)	MF	Mauro Rosales	4	0	0	0	0	0	4	0	0
7	(England)	MF	Nigel Reo-Coker	1	0	1	0	0	0	1	0	1
8	(Argentina)	MF	Agustín Pelletieri	4	0	1	0	0	0	4	0	1
9	(Mexico)	FW	Erick Torres	3	0	1	0	0	0	3	0	1
10	(Mexico)	FW	Adolfo Bautista	1	0	0	0	0	0	1	0	0
11	(Argentina)	MF	Leandro Barrera	3	0	0	0	0	0	3	0	0
12	(United States)	MF	Marco Delgado	5	0	1	0	0	0	5	0	1
14	(Japan)	DF	Akira Kaji	1	0	0	0	0	0	1	0	0
15	(United States)	MF	Eric Avila	2	0	0	0	0	0	2	0	0
16	(United States)	DF	Andrew Jean-Baptiste	2	0	0	0	0	0	2	0	0
18	(Honduras)	MF	Marvin Chávez	2	0	1	0	0	0	2	0	1
20	(United States)	MF	Carlos Alvarez	4	0	0	0	0	0	4	0	0
21	(United States)	FW	Kris Tyrpak	1	0	0	0	0	0	1	0	0
22	(United States)	DF	Eriq Zavaleta	1	0	0	0	0	0	1	0	0
24	(United States)	MF	Nathan Sturgis	4	0	0	0	0	0	4	0	0
25	(United States)	DF	Donny Toia	5	0	0	0	0	0	5	0	0
28	(United States)	GK	Tim Melia	0	0	1	0	0	0	0	0	1
30	(Ecuador)	MF	Oswaldo Minda	12	0	1	0	0	0	12	0	1
			TOTALS	71	0	9	0	0	0	71	0	9

=== Awards ===
==== MLS Player of the Week ====
Week	Player	Opponent	Link
17	(Mexico) Erick Torres	San Jose Earthquakes and Montreal Impact	Player of the Week

==== MLS Goal of the Week ====
Week	Player	Opponent	Link
17	(Mexico) Erick Torres	Montreal Impact	Goal Week 17

== See also ==
- 2014 in American soccer
