= Fragoso (surname) =

Fragoso is a surname. Notable people with the surname include:

- António Fragoso (1897–1918), Portuguese composer and pianist.
- Daniel Fragoso (born 1982), Spanish footballer
- Heleno Fragoso (1926–1985), Brazilian criminologist
- Ignacio Fragoso (born 1968), Mexican long-distance runner
- Javier Fragoso (1942–2014), Mexican former football player and manager
- Juan de Matos Fragoso (c. 1608-1689?), Spanish dramatist
- Margaux Fragoso (1979–2017), American memoirist
- Thiago Fragoso (born 1981), Brazilian actor, voice actor and singer
- Valdemar Gutiérrez Fragoso (born 1956), Mexican politician
- Lubelia Maria Furtado Fragoso (born 1967), Civic activist
