= Eriq Zavaleta =

Salvadoran footballer (born 1992)

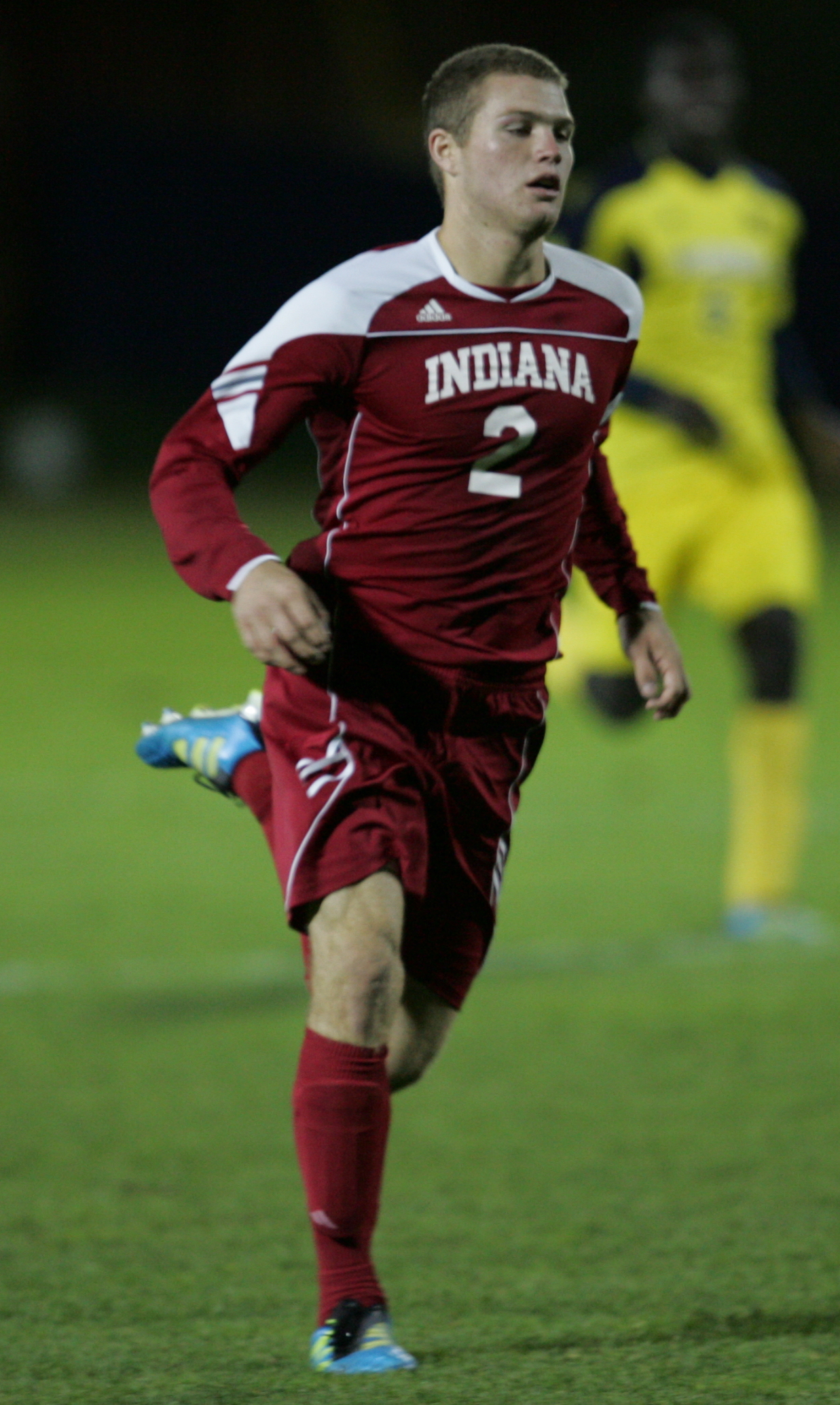
- Zavaleta playing for Indiana Hoosiers in 2011

Personal information
- Full name: Eriq Anthony Zavaleta
- Date of birth: 2 August 1992 (age 34)
- Place of birth: Westfield, Indiana, U.S.
- Height: 1.85 m (6 ft 1 in)
- Position: Defender

Youth career
- 2008–2009: IMG Soccer Academy
- 2009–2010: FC Pride
- 2010–2011: Real Salt Lake
- 2011: Chivas USA
- 2011: Columbus Crew

College career
Years	Team	Apps	(Gls)
2011–2012	Indiana Hoosiers	46	(28)

Senior career*
Years	Team	Apps	(Gls)
2013–2014	Seattle Sounders FC	5	(0)
2013	→ San Antonio Scorpions (loan)	4	(1)
2014	→ Chivas USA (loan)	17	(0)
2015–2021	Toronto FC	118	(2)
2016	→ Toronto FC II (loan)	2	(0)
2019	→ Toronto FC II (loan)	1	(0)
2022–2025	LA Galaxy	25	(3)
Total		172	(6)

International career
2008–2009	United States U17	23	(0)
2021–2023	El Salvador	27	(3)
- * Club domestic league appearances and goals

Eriq Anthony Zavaleta (born 2 August 1992) is a former professional footballer who plays as a center-back. Born in the United States, he played for the El Salvador national team.

== Youth and college ==
Zavaleta played his freshman and senior seasons of high school soccer at Westfield High School in Westfield, Indiana. He scored 25 goals and nine assists as a freshman and twenty goals and ten assists as a senior. He also spent his youth career with FC Pride, Real Salt Lake, and Chivas USA, and was also part of Columbus Crew's USL Super-20 championship team in 2011.

On 7 February 2011, Zavaleta signed a letter of intent to play college soccer at Indiana University. In his freshman year with the Hoosiers in 2011, Zavaleta started 22 games and led the team with ten goals and five assists and was also the team leader in points with 25. He went on to be named College Soccer News All-Freshman first team, NSCAA All-Great Lakes Region first team selection, Soccer America All-Freshman first team and Chicagoland Soccer News Player of the Year.

In his sophomore year, Zavaleta started all 24 matches and again was the team leader with 40 points, with 18 goals and four assists. He led the team to their eighth national title. One of the four assists came in the 2012 College Cup final against no. 3 Georgetown, when he set up teammate Nikita Kotlov for what turned out to be the title-clinching goal. He went on to be named Big Ten All-Tournament team, NSCAA third-team All-American, College Soccer News first-team All-American and the College Cup All-Tournament team. At Indiana University he was a member of Kappa Sigma fraternity.

== Club career ==
=== Seattle Sounders FC ===
On 5 January 2013, it was announced by agent Ron Waxman that Zavaleta had signed a Generation Adidas contract with Major League Soccer, making him eligible for the 2013 MLS SuperDraft. On 17 January, Zavaleta was selected 10th overall by Seattle Sounders FC and immediately added to the roster. He made his professional debut on 23 March 2013, in a 1–0 loss to the San Jose Earthquakes.

==== Chivas USA (loan) ====
On 28 February 2014, Chivas USA announced that they had added Zavaleta to their roster on loan from Seattle Sounders FC for one year. In 2014, he replaced Bobby Burling as the center back was out of play after he underwent a knee surgery.

=== Toronto FC ===
On 26 January 2015, Toronto FC announced that they had traded their 2016 MLS SuperDraft second-round pick to Seattle for Zavaleta.

On 5 September 2015, Zavaleta scored his first goal for Toronto in a 2–1 loss against his former club, the Seattle Sounders. In 2016, he was briefly loaned to Toronto FC II.

On 23 February 2021, Zavaleta re-signed with Toronto FC. At the end of the season, his contract option was declined.

=== LA Galaxy ===
On 10 March 2022, Zavaleta signed a one-year deal with LA Galaxy. He made his debut on 19 April 2022, against the San Diego Loyal SC in the U.S. Open Cup. He later made his MLS debut against Real Salt Lake on 30 April. In February 2023, the Galaxy announced Zavaleta had signed a new two-year deal to remain with the club. On 30 October 2025, the team announced that they had declined his contract option. On 6 February 2026, Zavaleta retired from professional football at 33.

== International career ==
Zavaleta was part of the U.S. Soccer Residency program in 2008–09 and made 23 appearances for the United States U-17 national team during that stretch, including three appearances in the 2009 FIFA U-17 World Cup. Zavaleta mostly played as a defender with the under-17s.

He is eligible to play for both the United States national team and El Salvador.

In April 2021, it was reported that Zavaleta had gained clearance from FIFA to represent El Salvador. The next month on May 26, Zavaleta was called up to El Salvador ahead of their 2022 FIFA world Cup qualification matches. He debuted for El Salvador in a 7–0 2022 FIFA World Cup qualification win over United States Virgin Islands on 5 June 2021. He scored his first goal in a 3–0 2022 World Cup qualifier win over Antigua and Barbuda on 8 June 2021. In his third match on 16 June, he was given the captain's armband to wear, after the team's captain was substituted out.

== Personal life ==
Zavaleta is the son of Carlos and Kristi Zavaleta. He has one sister, Alexa and one brother, Casey. His father played professionally in the United States and was also a member of the El Salvador national team. He is also the nephew of former MLS and U.S. national team defender, and his current coach at LA Galaxy and former coach at Toronto FC, Greg Vanney.

== Career statistics ==
=== Club ===
Appearances and goals by club, season and competition
Club	Season	League			Playoffs (Note: Includes MLS Cup playoff matches)		National cup (Note: Includes U.S. Open Cup and Canadian Championship matches)		Continental (Note: Includes CONCACAF Champions League/Cup, Campeones Cup and Leagues Cup matches)		Total	
Club	Season	Division	Apps	Goals	Apps	Goals	Apps	Goals	Apps	Goals	Apps	Goals
Seattle Sounders FC	2013	MLS	5	0	0	0	0	0	—		5	0
Seattle Sounders FC	2014	MLS	0	0	0	0	0	0	—		0	0
Seattle Sounders FC	Total		5	0	0	0	0	0	—		5	0
San Antonio Scorpions (loan)	2013	NASL	4	1	—		—		—		4	1
Chivas USA (loan)	2014	MLS	17	0	—		1	0	—		18	0
Toronto FC	2015	MLS	18	1	1	0	2	0	—		21	1
Toronto FC	2016	MLS	15	0	6	0	4	0	—		25	0
Toronto FC	2017	MLS	29	1	4	0	3	0	—		36	1
Toronto FC	2018	MLS	21	0	—		3	0	7	0	31	0
Toronto FC	2019	MLS	16	0	0	0	2	0	0	0	18	0
Toronto FC	2020	MLS	5 (Note: Includes one appearance in MLS is Back Tournament group stage)	0	0	0	0	0	—		5	0
Toronto FC	2021	MLS	14	0	—		0	0	2	0	16	0
Toronto FC	Total		118	2	11	0	14	0	9	0	152	2
Toronto FC II (loan)	2016	USL	2	0	—		—		—		2	0
Toronto FC II (loan)	2019	USL League One	1	0	—		—		—		1	0
Toronto FC II (loan)	Total		3	0	—		—		—		3	0
LA Galaxy	2022	MLS	4	0	0	0	2	0	—		6	0
LA Galaxy	2023	MLS	11	2	—		1	0	0	0	12	2
LA Galaxy	2024	MLS	5	1	0	0	—		2	0	7	1
LA Galaxy	2025	MLS	5	0	—		—		3	0	8	0
LA Galaxy	Total		25	3	0	0	3	0	5	0	33	3
Career total			172	6	11	0	18	0	14	0	213	6

=== International ===
Appearances and goals by national team and year
National team	Year	Apps	Goals
El Salvador	2021	13	1
El Salvador	2022	6	1
El Salvador	2023	8	1
Total		27	3

Scores and results list El Salvador's goal tally first.

List of international goals scored by Eriq Zavaleta
No.	Date	Venue	Opponent	Score	Result	Competition
1	8 June 2021	Estadio Cuscatlán, San Salvador, El Salvador	Antigua and Barbuda	1–0	3–0	2022 FIFA World Cup qualification
2	24 March 2022	Independence Park, Kingston, Jamaica	Jamaica	1–0	1–1	2022 FIFA World Cup qualification
3	10 September 2023	Estadio Jorge "El Mágico" González, San Salvador, El Salvador	Trinidad and Tobago	1–0	2–3	2023–24 CONCACAF Nations League A

== Honors ==
Toronto FC

- MLS Cup: 2017
- Supporters' Shield: 2017
- Canadian Championship: 2016, 2017, 2018
- Trillium Cup: 2016, 2017, 2019

LA Galaxy

- MLS Cup: 2024

Indiana University

- NCAA College Cup: 2012

Individual

- College Soccer News All-Freshman first team: 2011
- NSCAA All-Great Lakes Region first team: 2011
- Soccer America All-Freshman first team: 2011
- Chicagoland Soccer News Player of the Year (2): 2011, 2012
- Big Ten All-Tournament team: 2012
- NSCAA third-team All-American: 2012
- College Soccer News first-team All-American: 2012
- College Cup All-Tournament team: 2012
- Soccer America MVP first team: 2012
