= National Social Security Workers Union =

- Sindicato Nacional de Trabajadores del Seguro Social
- Abbreviation: SNTSS
- Founded: April 6, 1943
- Headquarters: Cuauhtémoc, Mexican Federal District
- Location: Mexico
- Key people: Dr. Valdemar Gutiérrez Fragoso, General Secretary
- Website: sntss.org.mx

The National Social Security Workers Union (Sindicato Nacional de Trabajadores del Seguro Social or SNTSS) is a Mexican labor union representing employees of the Mexican Social Security Institute (IMSS).

The current Leader of the SNTSS is Roberto Vega Galina.
