= 2016 Toronto FC season =

Toronto FC 2016 soccer season

Toronto FC
2016 season
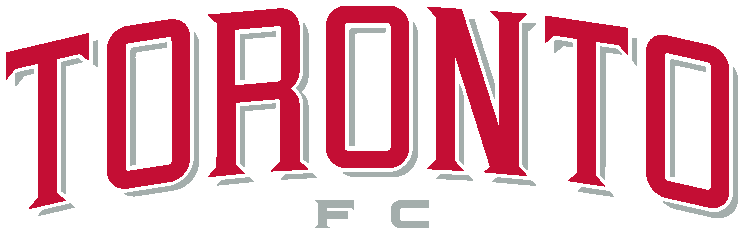
- General manager: Tim Bezbatchenko
- Head coach: Greg Vanney
- Stadium: BMO Field
- Major League Soccer: Conference: 3rd Overall: 5th
- MLS Cup playoffs: Runners-up
- Canadian Championship: Winners
- Top goalscorer: League: Sebastian Giovinco (17); All: Sebastian Giovinco (22)
- Highest home attendance: 36,045 (December 10 vs. Seattle Sounders FC)
- Lowest home attendance: 20,011 (June 21 vs. Vancouver Whitecaps FC)
- Average home league attendance: League: 26,583; All: 26,787
Home colours	Away colours

The 2016 Toronto FC season was the 10th season in the history of Toronto FC.

Toronto finished third in the Eastern Conference, thus qualifying for the playoffs for a second consecutive season. By defeating the Philadelphia Union 3–1 in the knockout round, the club earned their first ever playoff victory, and after defeating New York City FC 7–0 on aggregate, they reached their first-ever conference final, where they would face the Montreal Impact, their Canadian rivals.

The club set a BMO Field attendance record of about 36,000 for the second leg of the conference final on November 30, as Toronto was able to use temporary seats in the south end that were originally installed for the 104th Grey Cup. Montreal had won the first leg of the conference championship 3–2 at the Olympic Stadium in Montreal a week prior. In the home return leg, Toronto defeated Montreal 5–2 after extra time, advancing 7–5 on aggregate and becoming the first Canadian team to compete in an MLS Cup final. On December 10, Toronto lost MLS Cup 2016 at BMO Field in front of another record-breaking 36,045 fans, falling to the Seattle Sounders 5–4 on penalties following a goalless draw after extra time.

== Background ==
During the 2015 season, Toronto FC finished sixth out of ten teams in the Eastern Conference. They qualified for the playoffs for the first time, losing 3–0 in the knockout round to the Montreal Impact.

== Squad ==
As of December 1, 2016.

No.	Player	Nationality	Position	Date of birth (age at end of year)	Previous club
Goalkeepers
1	Clint Irwin	(United States)	GK	April 1, 1989 (aged 27)	(United States) Colorado Rapids
25	Alex Bono	(United States)	GK	April 25, 1994 (aged 22)	(United States) Syracuse Orange
40	Quillan Roberts	(Canada)	GK	September 13, 1994 (aged 22)	(Canada) TFC Academy
Defenders
2	Justin Morrow	(United States)	FB	October 4, 1987 (aged 29)	(United States) San Jose Earthquakes
3	Drew Moor	(United States)	CB	January 15, 1984 (aged 32)	(United States) Colorado Rapids
5	Ashtone Morgan	(Canada)	FB	February 9, 1991 (aged 25)	(Canada) TFC Academy
6	Nick Hagglund	(United States)	CB	September 14, 1992 (aged 24)	(United States) Xavier Musketeers
13	Clément Simonin	(France)	CB	July 1, 1991 (aged 25)	(United States) NC State Wolfpack
15	Eriq Zavaleta	(United States)	CB	August 2, 1992 (aged 24)	(United States) Seattle Sounders FC
23	Josh Williams	(United States)	CB	April 18, 1988 (aged 28)	(United States) New York City FC
28	Mark Bloom	(United States)	FB	November 25, 1987 (aged 29)	(United States) Atlanta Silverbacks
33	Steven Beitashour	(Iran)	FB	February 1, 1987 (aged 29)	(Canada) Vancouver Whitecaps FC
Midfielders
4	Michael Bradley	(United States)	CM	July 31, 1987 (aged 29)	(Italy) Roma
7	Will Johnson	(Canada)	CM	January 21, 1987 (aged 29)	(United States) Portland Timbers
8	Benoît Cheyrou	(France)	CM	May 3, 1981 (aged 35)	(France) Marseille
9	Tsubasa Endoh	(Japan)	RW	August 20, 1993 (aged 23)	(United States) Maryland Terrapins
14	Jay Chapman	(Canada)	AM	January 1, 1994 (aged 22)	(United States) Michigan State Spartans
18	Marky Delgado	(United States)	CM	May 16, 1995 (aged 21)	(United States) Chivas USA
19	Daniel Lovitz	(United States)	LW	August 27, 1991 (aged 25)	(United States) Elon Phoenix
20	Chris Mannella	(Canada)	DM	June 7, 1994 (aged 22)	(Canada) TFC Academy
21	Jonathan Osorio	(Canada)	AM	June 12, 1992 (aged 24)	(Canada) SC Toronto
31	Armando Cooper	(Panama)	AM	November 26, 1987 (aged 29)	(Panama) Árabe Unido
Forwards
10	Sebastian Giovinco	(Italy)	ST	January 26, 1987 (aged 29)	(Italy) Juventus
11	Molham Babouli	(Canada)	ST	January 2, 1993 (aged 23)	(Canada) Toronto FC II
17	Jozy Altidore	(United States)	CF	November 6, 1989 (aged 27)	(England) Sunderland
22	Jordan Hamilton	(Canada)	ST	March 17, 1996 (aged 20)	(Canada) TFC Academy
87	Tosaint Ricketts	(Canada)	FW	August 6, 1987 (aged 29)	(Turkey) Boluspor

== Transfers ==
=== In ===
No.	Pos.	Player	Transferred from	Fee/notes	Date	Source
3	DF	(United States) Drew Moor	(United States) Colorado Rapids	Free Transfer	December 16, 2015	
33	DF	(Iran) Steven Beitashour	(Canada) Vancouver Whitecaps FC	Acquired for 2016 MLS SuperDraft 2nd Round Pick	December 18, 2015	
7	MF	(Canada) Will Johnson	(United States) Portland Timbers	Acquired for a conditional 2017 MLS SuperDraft 2nd Round Pick & targeted allocation money	December 18, 2015	
1	GK	(United States) Clint Irwin	(United States) Colorado Rapids	Acquired for a 2016 MLS SuperDraft 3rd Round Pick, a conditional 2017 MLS SuperDraft 1st round pick & targeted allocation money	January 18, 2016	
9	MF	(Japan) Tsubasa Endoh	(United States) Maryland Terrapins	Selected 9th overall in the 2016 MLS SuperDraft	February 27, 2016	
11	FW	(Canada) Molham Babouli	(Canada) Toronto FC II	Free Transfer	March 5, 2016	
48	MF	(Canada) Raheem Edwards	(Canada) Toronto FC II	Short-Term Agreement	June 29, 2016	
87	FW	(Canada) Tosaint Ricketts	(Turkey) Boluspor	Free Transfer	August 20, 2016	

==== Draft picks ====
Draft picks are not automatically signed to the team roster. Only those who are signed to a contract will be listed as transfers in. Only trades involving draft picks and executed after the start of 2016 MLS SuperDraft will be listed in the notes.

No.	Pos.	Player	Previous club	Notes	Date	Source
9	MF	(Japan) Tsubasa Endoh	(United States) Maryland Terrapins	MLS SuperDraft 1st Round Pick (#9)	January 14, 2016	
	MF	(United States) Mitchell Taintor	(United States) Rutgers Scarlet Knights	MLS SuperDraft 3rd Round Pick (#59)	January 19, 2016	
	FW	(United States) Darius Madison	(United States) UMBC Retrievers	MLS SuperDraft 4th Round Pick (#70)	January 19, 2016	
	MF	(United States) Brian James	(United States) Penn State Nittany Lions	MLS SuperDraft 4th Round Pick (#80)	January 19, 2016	

=== Loan In ===
No.	Pos.	Player	Loaned from	Fee/notes	Date	Source
31	MF	(Panama) Armando Cooper	(Panama) Árabe Unido	Loan	August 18, 2016	

=== Out ===
No.	Pos.	Player	Transferred to	Fee/notes	Date	Source
1	GK	(United States) Chris Konopka	(Scotland) Ross County	Contract Expired	December 1, 2015	
34	MF	(Canada) Manny Aparicio	(Spain) Órdenes	Contract Expired	December 1, 2015	
11	MF	(Brazil) Jackson	(United States) San Francisco Deltas	Contract Expired	December 1, 2015	
55	FW	(United States) Robbie Findley	(United States) Rayo OKC	Contract Expired	December 1, 2015	
12	GK	(United States) Joe Bendik	(United States) Orlando City SC	Option Declined; Traded for a conditional 2017 MLS SuperDraft 4th Round Pick	December 21, 2015	
41	DF	(Morocco) Ahmed Kantari	(France) Valenciennes	Waived	January 13, 2016	
22	FW	(England) Luke Moore		Waived	February 26, 2016	
26	MF	(United States) Collen Warner	(United States) Houston Dynamo	Traded for a conditional 2017 MLS SuperDraft 2nd Round Pick	March 2, 2016	
16	FW	(United States) Herculez Gomez	(United States) Seattle Sounders FC	Waived	March 2, 2016	
24	DF	(Poland) Damien Perquis	(England) Nottingham Forest	Mutual Termination	July 12, 2016	

== Competitions ==
=== Preseason ===
January 30	UC Irvine Anteaters	2–2	Toronto FC	Irvine, California
7:00PM	Tilley 61' (pen.); Janjigian 88'	Report	Endoh 17'; Hamilton 55' (pen.)	Stadium: Anteater Stadium

February 1	Cal State Fullerton Titans	0–4	Toronto FC	Irvine, California
9:00PM		Report	Giovinco 15'; Uccello 59'; Babouli 68'; Chapman 79'	Stadium: Anteater Stadium

February 3	Ventura County Fusion	0–3	Toronto FC	Irvine, California
9:00PM		Report	Giovinco 31'; Hamilton 52', 90+1'	Stadium: Anteater Stadium; Attendance: 1,231

February 6	LA Galaxy	2–3	Toronto FC	Carson, California
2:00PM	Keane 4'; Rogers 41'	Report	Giovinco 2', 45'; Babouli 52'	Stadium: StubHub Center

February 17	Orlando City B	1–0	Toronto FC	Four Corners, Florida
12:30PM	da Silva 6'	Report		Stadium: Champions Gate

February 20	New York Red Bulls	1–1	Toronto FC	Four Corners, Florida
12:30PM	Hagglund 55' (o.g.)	Report	Babouli 65'	Stadium: Champions Gate
Note: 70 minute match

February 21	Orlando City SC	2–1	Toronto FC	Four Corners, Florida
1:00PM	Kaká 47', 63' (pen.)	Report	Osorio 5'	Stadium: Champions Gate

February 24 Suncoast Invitational	Toronto FC	1–1	Montreal Impact	Clearwater, Florida
4:00PM	Johnson (yellow card) 20'; Hamilton 79'	Report	Oduro 22'	Stadium: Joe DiMaggio Sports Complex

February 27 Suncoast Invitational	Philadelphia Union	1–0	Toronto FC	St. Petersburg, Florida
4:00PM	Sapong 60'	Report	Bradley (yellow card) 33'; Bloom (yellow card) 38'; Moor (yellow card) 79'	Stadium: Al Lang Stadium

=== Major League Soccer ===
==== League tables ====
===== Eastern Conference =====
Pos	Team	Pld	W	L	T	GF	GA	GD	Pts	Qualification
1	New York Red Bulls	34	16	9	9	61	44	+17	57	Qualification for the conference semifinals
2	New York City FC	34	15	10	9	62	57	+5	54	Qualification for the conference semifinals
3	Toronto FC	34	14	9	11	51	39	+12	53	Qualification for the knockout round
4	D.C. United	34	11	10	13	53	47	+6	46	Qualification for the knockout round
5	Montreal Impact	34	11	11	12	49	53	−4	45	Qualification for the knockout round

Source: MLS

===== Overall =====
Pos	Team	Pld	W	L	T	GF	GA	GD	Pts	Qualification
3	New York Red Bulls	34	16	9	9	61	44	+17	57	Qualification for the CONCACAF Champions League
4	New York City FC	34	15	10	9	62	57	+5	54	
5	Toronto FC (V)	34	14	9	11	51	39	+12	53	Qualification for the CONCACAF Champions League
6	LA Galaxy	34	12	6	16	54	39	+15	52	
7	Seattle Sounders FC (C)	34	14	14	6	44	43	+1	48	Qualification for the CONCACAF Champions League

Source: MLS
Rules for classification: 1) points; 2) total wins; 3) total goal differential; 4) total goals scored;
(C) MLS Cup champions; (V) Canadian Championship winners

==== Results summary ====
Overall								Home						Away					
Pld	W	D	L	GF	GA	GD	Pts	W	D	L	GF	GA	GD	W	D	L	GF	GA	GD
34	14	11	9	51	39	+12	53	8	6	3	28	17	+11	6	5	6	23	22	+1

Last updated: October 23, 2016.
Source: MLS

==== Results by round ====
Round	1	2	3	4	5	6	7	8	9	10	11	12	13	14	15	16	17	18	19	20	21	22	23	24	25	26	27	28	29	30	31	32	33	34
Ground	A	A	A	A	A	A	A	A	H	H	H	H	A	H	A	H	H	A	A	H	H	H	H	A	A	A	H	A	H	H	H	H	A	H
Result	W	D	L	L	D	W	W	L	W	L	D	D	L	W	L	D	W	D	L	W	W	W	W	D	W	W	L	W	D	D	D	L	D	W

Updated to match(es) played on October 23, 2016. Source: Regular season matches
A = Away; H = Home; W = Win; D = Draw; L = Loss

==== Matches ====
March 6	New York Red Bulls	0–2	Toronto FC	Harrison, New Jersey
1:30PM	Zubar (yellow card) 47'	Report	Lovitz (yellow card) 38'; Giovinco 82' (pen.), (yellow card) 88'; Delgado 90+1'	Stadium: Red Bull Arena; Attendance: 21,303; Referee: Allen Chapman

March 13	New York City FC	2–2	Toronto FC	New York, New York
5:00PM	Villa 24' (pen.), 28'; Bravo (yellow card) 52'; Lopez (yellow card) 89'	Report	Perquis 45+2'; Giovinco 76'; Morgan (yellow card) 90'	Stadium: Yankee Stadium; Attendance: 30,315; Referee: Alan Kelly

March 20	Sporting Kansas City	1–0	Toronto FC	Kansas City, Kansas
7:00PM	Davis 70'; Espinoza (red card) 84'; Melia (yellow card) 87'	Report	Cheyrou (yellow card) 60'; Morrow (yellow card) 71'	Stadium: Children's Mercy Park; Attendance: 19,867; Referee: Baldomero Toledo

April 2	Colorado Rapids	1–0	Toronto FC	Commerce City, Colorado
9:00PM	Solignac 18'; Burch (yellow card) 45'; Burling (yellow card) 59'; Doyle (yellow card) 82'	Report	Cheyrou (yellow card) 11' (yellow-red card) 13'; Perquis (yellow card) 48'	Stadium: Dick's Sporting Goods Park; Attendance: 10,772; Referee: Ismail Elfath

April 9	New England Revolution	1–1	Toronto FC	Foxborough, Massachusetts
4:00PM	Rowe 14'; Koffie (yellow card) 20'	Report	Morrow (yellow card) 58'; Giovinco 58'; Altidore (yellow card) 61'; Johnson (yellow card) 73'; Babouli (yellow card) 90+1'	Stadium: Gillette Stadium; Attendance: 16,935; Referee: Edvin Jurisevic

April 16	D.C. United	0–1	Toronto FC	Washington, D.C.
7:00PM	Marcelo Sarvas (yellow card) 89'; Birnbaum (yellow card) 90+5'	Report	Giovinco 1'; Altidore (yellow card) 35'; Irwin (yellow card) 88'	Stadium: RFK Stadium; Attendance: 16,236; Referee: Mathieu Bourdeau

April 23	Montreal Impact	0–2	Toronto FC	Montreal, Quebec
4:00PM		Report	Morrow (yellow card) 27'; Giovinco 40' (pen.), 81'	Stadium: Saputo Stadium; Attendance: 20,801; Referee: Ted Unkel

May 1	Portland Timbers	2–1	Toronto FC	Portland, Oregon
3:30PM	Adi 17'; Ridgewell (yellow card) 62'; Valeri 74'; Asprilla (yellow card) 83'	Report	Johnson 40'; Perquis (yellow card) 57'	Stadium: Providence Park; Attendance: 21,144; Referee: Baldomero Toledo

May 7	Toronto FC	1–0	FC Dallas	Toronto, Ontario
7:30PM	Delgado (yellow card) 14'; Endoh 28'; Bradley (yellow card) 43'; Beitashour (yellow card) 74'; Johnson (yellow card) 87'; Altidore (yellow card) 90+6'	Report	Ulloa (yellow card) 39'	Stadium: BMO Field; Attendance: 30,025; Referee: Jorge Gonzalez

May 14	Toronto FC	3–4	Vancouver Whitecaps FC	Toronto, Ontario
7:30PM	Altidore (penalty missed) 35'; Giovinco 37', 66', (yellow card) 90+5'; Moor 80'	Report	Manneh 12', 70'; Bolaños 18'; Kah (yellow card) 35'; Aird (yellow card) 63' (yellow-red card) 76'; Morales 72'; Pérez (yellow card) 89'	Stadium: BMO Field; Attendance: 24,748; Referee: Robert Sibiga

May 18	Toronto FC	1–1	New York City FC	Toronto, Ontario
7:00PM	Bradley (yellow card) 39'; Johnson 42'	Report	Poku 16'; Mullins (yellow card) 19'; Bravo (yellow card) 56'; Diskerud (yellow card) 70'; Villa (yellow card) 85'	Stadium: BMO Field; Attendance: 30,262; Referee: Sorin Stoica

May 21	Toronto FC	0–0	Columbus Crew SC	Toronto, Ontario
5:00PM	Morrow (yellow card) 56'; Beitashour (yellow card) 82'	Report	Trapp (yellow card) 88'	Stadium: BMO Field; Attendance: 26,252; Referee: Nima Saghafi

May 28	New York Red Bulls	3–0	Toronto FC	Harrison, New Jersey
7:00PM	B. Wright-Phillips 4', 25', 27'; Verón (red card) 43'; McCarty (yellow card) 68'	Report	Johnson (penalty missed) 48'; Morgan (yellow card) 63'; Perquis (yellow card) 84'	Stadium: Red Bull Arena; Attendance: 20,324; Referee: Allen Chapman

June 18	Toronto FC	1–0	LA Galaxy	Toronto, Ontario
7:30PM	Moor 76'	Report	DeLaGarza (yellow card) 28'	Stadium: BMO Field; Attendance: 30,025; Referee: Ricardo Salazar

June 25	Orlando City SC	3–2	Toronto FC	Orlando, Florida
7:30PM	Larin 5'; Mateos (yellow card) 32'; Winter 83'; Kaká 90+10'	Report	Hamilton 47'; Osorio (yellow card) 66'; Morrow 90'; Williams (red card) 90+9'	Stadium: Camping World Stadium; Attendance: 27,818; Referee: Ismail Elfath

July 2	Toronto FC	1–1	Seattle Sounders FC	Toronto, Ontario
7:30PM	Delgado (yellow card) 44'; Hamilton 60'; Beitashour (yellow card) 90+1'	Report	Morris 61'	Stadium: BMO Field; Attendance: 26,750; Referee: Kevin Stott

July 9	Toronto FC	1–0	Chicago Fire	Toronto, Ontario
7:30PM	Morrow 9'	Report		Stadium: BMO Field; Attendance: 27,934; Referee: Silviu Petrescu

July 13	Columbus Crew SC	1–1	Toronto FC	Columbus, Ohio
7:30PM	Afful 54'	Report	Bloom (yellow card) 32'; Hamilton 64'	Stadium: Mapfre Stadium; Attendance: 13,410; Referee: Robert Sibiga

July 16	San Jose Earthquakes	2–1	Toronto FC	San Jose, California
10:30PM	Amarikwa 30'; Alashe (yellow card) 33'; Godoy (red card) 42'; Quintero (red card) 53'; Dawkins 71'	Report	Morrow 44'	Stadium: Avaya Stadium; Attendance: 18,000; Referee: Alejandro Mariscal

July 23	Toronto FC	4–1	D.C. United	Toronto, Ontario
7:30PM	Chapman (yellow card) 17'; Giovinco 21', 39', 90+1'; Delgado 29', (yellow card) 60'; Moor (yellow card) 54'	Report	Jeffrey 24', (yellow card) 38'; Sarvas (yellow card) 28'	Stadium: BMO Field; Attendance: 26,349; Referee: Armando Villarreal

July 31	Toronto FC	3–0	Columbus Crew SC	Toronto, Ontario
7:30PM	Endoh 8'; Giovinco 24'; Altidore 87'	Report	Tchani (yellow card) 89'; Parkhurst (yellow card) 90+1'	Stadium: BMO Field; Attendance: 23,979; Referee: Allen Chapman

August 3	Toronto FC	1–0	Real Salt Lake	Toronto, Ontario
7:00PM	Ricketts 68'	Report	Maund (yellow card) 88'	Stadium: BMO Field; Attendance: 27,859; Referee: Alan Kelly

August 6	Toronto FC	4–1	New England Revolution	Toronto, Ontario
7:30PM	Giovinco 20', 29', 77' (pen.); Altidore 90+3'	Report	Koffie (yellow card) 54'; Bunbury 88'	Stadium: BMO Field; Attendance: 27,495; Referee: Ted Unkel

August 14	Houston Dynamo	1–1	Toronto FC	Houston, Texas
9:15PM	Maidana 8'; Mansally (red card)	Report	Altidore 24'; Bradley (yellow card) 82'	Stadium: BBVA Compass Stadium; Attendance: 17,474; Referee: Hilario Grajeda
Note: Match was originally scheduled for August 13 but was postponed due to thunderstorms.

August 20	Philadelphia Union	1–3	Toronto FC	Chester, Pennsylvania
7:00PM	Tribbett 24'; Barnetta (yellow card) 67'; Yaro (yellow card) 73'	Report	Giovinco 18'; Moor 30', (yellow card) 40'; Morrow (yellow card) 42'; Altidore 44'; Johnson (yellow card) 45'; Bradley (yellow card) 58'	Stadium: Talen Energy Stadium; Attendance: 18,271; Referee: Mark Geiger

August 24	Orlando City SC	1–2	Toronto FC	Orlando, Florida
7:30PM	Larin 56'; Hines (yellow card) 57'; Mateos (yellow card) 82'	Report	Ricketts 7'; Delgado (yellow card) 52'; Altidore 86'	Stadium: Camping World Stadium; Attendance: 23,802; Referee: Chris Penso

August 27	Toronto FC	0–1	Montreal Impact	Toronto, Ontario
7:30PM	Delgado (yellow card) 44'; Zavaleta (yellow card) 48'; Osorio (yellow card) 70'	Report	Mallace (red card) 43'; Bush (yellow card) 73'; Piatti 73'; Mancosu (yellow card) 81'; Bekker (yellow card) 90+1'	Stadium: BMO Field; Attendance: 28,454; Referee: Jorge Gonzalez

September 10	Chicago Fire	1–2	Toronto FC	Bridgeview, Illinois
8:30PM	de Leeuw 58'	Report	Altidore 33'; Osorio 52'	Stadium: Toyota Park; Attendance: 18,391; Referee: Marcos de Oliveira

September 18	Toronto FC	3–3	New York Red Bulls	Toronto, Ontario
5:00PM	Bradley 41'; Altidore 68', 86'	Report	Beitashour 12' (o.g.); B. Wright-Phillips 31', 48'; Duvall (yellow card) 81'; Felipe (yellow card) 90+2'	Stadium: BMO Field; Attendance: 24,078; Referee: Robert Sibiga

September 24	Toronto FC	1–1	Philadelphia Union	Toronto, Ontario
5:00PM	Johnson (yellow card) 24'; Morrow 70'; Altidore (yellow card) 90+4'	Report	Bedoya 25'; Marquez (yellow card) 66'	Stadium: BMO Field; Attendance: 26,455; Referee: Ismail Elfath

September 28	Toronto FC	0–0	Orlando City SC	Toronto, Ontario
7:30PM	Ricketts (yellow card) 56' (yellow-red card) 70'; Beitashour (yellow card) 74'	Report	Shea (yellow card) 45'; Higuita (yellow card) 62'	Stadium: BMO Field; Attendance: 23,805; Referee: Alan Kelly

October 1	Toronto FC	1–2	D.C. United	Toronto, Ontario
7:30PM	Altidore 36'	Report	Vincent (yellow card) 22'; Neagle 39', 58'; Acosta (yellow card) 83'	Stadium: BMO Field; Attendance: 22,212; Referee: Mark Geiger

October 16	Montreal Impact	2–2	Toronto FC	Montreal, Quebec
3:00PM	Piatti 19', 55' (pen.); Donadel (yellow card) 59'	Report	Bradley (yellow card) 25'; Beitashour (yellow card) 45+1'; Altidore 51'; Giovinco (yellow card) 68'; Moor (yellow card) 78'; Ricketts 86'	Stadium: Saputo Stadium; Attendance: 20,801; Referee: Jair Marrufo

October 23	Toronto FC	3–2	Chicago Fire	Toronto, Ontario
4:00PM	Giovinco 45' (pen.); Zavaleta (yellow card) 45+2'; Morrow 54'; Osorio 62'	Report	de Leeuw 18'; Goossens 83'	Stadium: BMO Field; Attendance: 25,235; Referee: Fotis Bazakos

=== MLS Cup Playoffs ===
October 26 Knockout round	Toronto FC	3–1	Philadelphia Union	Toronto, Ontario
7:30PM	Bradley (yellow card) 14'; Giovinco 15'; Altidore (yellow card) 45+1', (goal) 85'; Osorio 48'	Report	Sapong (yellow card) 25'; Bedoya (yellow card) 43', (goal) 73'; Tribbett (yellow card) 90'	Stadium: BMO Field; Attendance: 21,759; Referee: Baldomero Toledo

October 30 Eastern Conference Semifinals Leg 1	Toronto FC	2–0	New York City FC	Toronto, Ontario
7:00PM	Cooper (yellow card) 23'; Altidore 84'; Ricketts 90+2'	Report	Harrison (yellow card) 33'; Chanot (yellow card) 44'; Lopez (yellow card) 58'; Bravo (yellow card) 65'; Lampard (yellow card) 73'	Stadium: BMO Field; Attendance: 28,220; Referee: Silviu Petrescu

November 6 Eastern Conference Semifinals Leg 2	New York City FC	0–5 (0–7 agg.)	Toronto FC	New York, New York
6:30PM		Report	Giovinco 6', 20' (pen.), 90+1'; Altidore 30'; Osorio 50'	Stadium: Yankee Stadium; Attendance: 28,355; Referee: Kevin Stott

November 22 Eastern Conference Finals Leg 1	Montreal Impact	3–2	Toronto FC	Montreal, Quebec
8:00PM	Oduro 10'; Mancosu 12'; Oyongo 53'	Report	Altidore 68'; Bradley 73'	Stadium: Olympic Stadium; Attendance: 61,004; Referee: Juan Guzman

November 30 Eastern Conference Finals Leg 2	Toronto FC	5–2 (a.e.t.) (7–5 agg.)	Montreal Impact	Toronto, Ontario
7:00PM	Cooper 37'; Altidore 45'; Hagglund 68'; Cheyrou 98'; Ricketts 100'	Report	Ciman (yellow card) 8'; Oduro 24'; Piatti 53'; Camara (yellow card) 82'	Stadium: BMO Field; Attendance: 36,000; Referee: Jair Marrufo

December 10 MLS Cup Final	Toronto FC	0–0 (a.e.t.) (4–5 p)	Seattle Sounders FC	Toronto, Ontario
8:00PM	Bradley (yellow card) 90+3'	Report	Marshall (yellow card) 45+1'; Jones (yellow card) 72'	Stadium: BMO Field; Attendance: 36,045; Referee: Alan Kelly
	Penalties
	Altidore (penalty scored); Bradley (penalty missed); Cheyrou (penalty scored); Johnson (penalty scored); Moor (penalty scored); Morrow (penalty missed)		Evans (penalty scored); Ivanschitz (penalty scored); Fernández (penalty missed); Jones (penalty scored); Lodeiro (penalty scored); Torres (penalty scored)

=== Canadian Championship ===
June 1 Semifinal Leg 1	Toronto FC	4–2	Montreal Impact	Toronto, Ontario
7:30PM	Osorio 13', 36'; Hamilton 60', 80'; Irwin (yellow card) 90+2'	Report	Bernier (red card) 45+2'; Salazar 86'; Drogba 90+1'	Stadium: BMO Field; Attendance: 22,143; Referee: David Gantar

June 8 Semifinal Leg 2	Montreal Impact	0–0 (2–4 agg.)	Toronto FC	Montreal, Quebec
7:30PM	Drogba (yellow card) 50'; Ontivero (red card) 60'; Oduro (yellow card) 88'	Report	Zavaleta (yellow card) 45'	Stadium: Saputo Stadium; Attendance: 18,964; Referee: Silviu Petrescu

June 21 Final Leg 1	Toronto FC	1–0	Vancouver Whitecaps FC	Toronto, Ontario
7:30PM	Giovinco 43'	Report	Bolaños (yellow card) 64'	Stadium: BMO Field; Attendance: 20,011; Referee: Mathieu Bourdeau

June 29 Final Leg 2	Vancouver Whitecaps FC	2–1 (2–2a agg.)	Toronto FC	Vancouver, British Columbia
10:00PM	Waston (yellow card) 32'; Mezquida 47'; Manneh (yellow card) 62'; Parker 68'	Report	Johnson 90+5'	Stadium: BC Place; Attendance: 19,376; Referee: Drew Fischer

=== Competitions summary ===
Competition	Record								First Match	Last Match	Final Position
Competition	G	W	D	L	GF	GA	GD	Win %	First Match	Last Match	Final Position
MLS Regular Season	34	14	11	9	51	39	+12	41.18	March 6, 2016	October 23, 2016	3rd in Eastern Conference, 5th Overall
MLS Cup Playoffs	6	4	1	1	17	6	+11	66.67	October 26, 2016	December 10, 2016	Runners-up
Canadian Championship	4	2	1	1	6	4	+2	50.00	June 1, 2016	June 29, 2016	Champions
Total	44	20	13	11	74	49	+25	45.45			

Source: Competitions

== Statistics ==
=== Squad and statistics ===
As of December 10, 2016

No.	Pos	Nat	Player	Total		Major League Soccer		MLS Cup Playoffs		Canadian Championship	
No.	Pos	Nat	Player	Apps	Goals	Apps	Goals	Apps	Goals	Apps	Goals
1	GK	(United States) USA	Clint Irwin	27	0	18+0	0	6+0	0	3+0	0
2	DF	(United States) USA	Justin Morrow	40	5	31+0	5	6+0	0	2+1	0
3	DF	(United States) USA	Drew Moor	41	3	32+0	3	6+0	0	3+0	0
4	MF	(United States) USA	Michael Bradley	30	2	24+0	1	6+0	1	0+0	0
5	DF	(Canada) CAN	Ashtone Morgan	9	0	0+7	0	0+0	0	2+0	0
6	DF	(United States) USA	Nick Hagglund	26	1	8+8	0	6+0	1	2+2	0
7	MF	(Canada) CAN	Will Johnson	32	3	19+4	2	1+5	0	3+0	1
8	MF	(France) FRA	Benoît Cheyrou	21	1	9+5	0	0+3	1	4+0	0
9	MF	(Japan) JPN	Tsubasa Endoh	23	2	15+6	2	0+0	0	0+2	0
10	FW	(Italy) ITA	Sebastian Giovinco	37	22	28+0	17	6+0	4	2+1	1
11	FW	(Canada) CAN	Molham Babouli	20	0	6+10	0	0+0	0	4+0	0
13	DF	(France) FRA	Clément Simonin	0	0	0+0	0	0+0	0	0+0	0
14	MF	(Canada) CAN	Jay Chapman	19	0	9+9	0	0+0	0	0+1	0
15	DF	(United States) USA	Eriq Zavaleta	24	0	15+0	0	6+0	0	3+0	0
17	FW	(United States) USA	Jozy Altidore	29	15	16+7	10	6+0	5	0+0	0
18	MF	(United States) USA	Marky Delgado	32	2	23+5	2	0+1	0	3+0	0
19	MF	(United States) USA	Daniel Lovitz	14	0	5+7	0	0+0	0	2+0	0
20	MF	(Canada) CAN	Chris Mannella	0	0	0+0	0	0+0	0	0+0	0
21	MF	(Canada) CAN	Jonathan Osorio	40	6	26+4	2	5+1	2	4+0	2
22	FW	(Canada) CAN	Jordan Hamilton	18	5	11+3	3	0+0	0	2+2	2
23	DF	(United States) USA	Josh Williams	15	0	11+4	0	0+0	0	0+0	0
25	GK	(United States) USA	Alex Bono	17	0	15+1	0	0+0	0	1+0	0
28	DF	(United States) USA	Mark Bloom	9	0	5+2	0	0+2	0	0+0	0
31	MF	(Panama) PAN	Armando Cooper	12	1	4+2	0	6+0	1	0+0	0
33	DF	(Iran) IRI	Steven Beitashour	38	0	29+0	0	6+0	0	3+0	0
36	MF	(United States) USA	Brian James	1	0	0+0	0	0+0	0	0+1	0
40	GK	(Canada) CAN	Quillan Roberts	0	0	0+0	0	0+0	0	0+0	0
48	MF	(Canada) CAN	Raheem Edwards	2	0	0+1	0	0+0	0	0+1	0
56	FW	(Canada) CAN	Malik Johnson	1	0	0+0	0	0+0	0	0+1	0
87	FW	(Canada) CAN	Tosaint Ricketts	17	5	4+7	3	0+6	2	0+0	0
Players who appeared for Toronto but left during the season:
24	DF	(Poland) POL	Damien Perquis	12	1	11+1	1	0+0	0	0+0	0

=== Goals and assists ===
Correct as of December 10, 2016

Goals
Pos.	Playing Pos.	Nation	Name	Major League Soccer	MLS Cup Playoffs	Canadian Championship	Total
1	FW	(Italy)	Sebastian Giovinco	17	4	1	22
2	FW	(United States)	Jozy Altidore	10	5	–	15
3	MF	(Canada)	Jonathan Osorio	2	2	2	6
4	FW	(Canada)	Jordan Hamilton	3	–	2	5
4	DF	(United States)	Justin Morrow	5	–	–	5
6	FW	(Canada)	Tosaint Ricketts	3	2	–	5
7	MF	(Canada)	Will Johnson	2	–	1	3
7	DF	(United States)	Drew Moor	3	–	–	3
9	MF	(United States)	Michael Bradley	1	1	–	2
9	MF	(United States)	Marky Delgado	2	–	–	2
9	MF	(Japan)	Tsubasa Endoh	2	–	–	2
12	MF	(France)	Benoît Cheyrou	–	1	–	1
12	MF	(Panama)	Armando Cooper	–	1	–	1
12	DF	(United States)	Nick Hagglund	–	1	–	1
12	DF	(Poland)	Damien Perquis	1	–	–	1
Total				51	17	6	74

Assists
Pos.	Playing Pos.	Nation	Name	Major League Soccer	MLS Cup Playoffs	Canadian Championship	Total
1	FW	(Italy)	Sebastian Giovinco	15	4	–	19
2	FW	(United States)	Jozy Altidore	5	4	–	9
3	MF	(Canada)	Will Johnson	5	1	–	6
4	MF	(United States)	Michael Bradley	5	–	–	5
4	DF	(United States)	Justin Morrow	4	1	–	5
4	MF	(Canada)	Jonathan Osorio	5	–	–	5
7	DF	(Iran)	Steven Beitashour	1	2	1	4
8	FW	(Canada)	Molham Babouli	1	–	2	3
8	MF	(Panama)	Armando Cooper	2	1	–	3
10	DF	(United States)	Mark Bloom	2	–	–	2
10	MF	(Canada)	Jay Chapman	2	–	–	2
10	MF	(France)	Benoît Cheyrou	2	–	–	2
10	MF	(United States)	Marky Delgado	2	–	–	2
10	DF	(United States)	Nick Hagglund	–	2	–	2
10	DF	(United States)	Eriq Zavaleta	1	1	–	2
16	FW	(Canada)	Jordan Hamilton	1	–	–	1
16	DF	(Canada)	Ashtone Morgan	–	–	1	1
16	DF	(Poland)	Damien Perquis	1	–	–	1
16	FW	(Canada)	Tosaint Ricketts	–	1	–	1
16	DF	(United States)	Josh Williams	1	–	–	1
Total				55	17	4	76

=== Clean sheets ===
Correct as of December 10, 2016

R	Pos	Nat	Name	Major League Soccer	MLS Cup Playoffs	Canadian Championship	Total
1	GK	(United States)	Clint Irwin	6	3	2	11
2	GK	(United States)	Alex Bono	4	–	–	4
			TOTALS	10	3	2	15

=== Disciplinary record ===
Correct as of December 10, 2016

No.	Pos.	Name	MLS		MLS Cup Playoffs		Canadian Championship		Total	
No.	Pos.	Name	Yellow card	Red card	Yellow card	Red card	Yellow card	Red card	Yellow card	Red card
1	GK	(United States) Clint Irwin	1	0	0	0	1	0	2	0
2	DF	(United States) Justin Morrow	5	0	0	0	0	0	5	0
3	DF	(United States) Drew Moor	3	0	0	0	0	0	3	0
4	MF	(United States) Michael Bradley	5	0	2	0	0	0	7	0
5	DF	(Canada) Ashtone Morgan	2	0	0	0	0	0	2	0
7	MF	(Canada) Will Johnson	4	0	0	0	0	0	4	0
8	MF	(France) Benoît Cheyrou	3	1	0	0	0	0	3	1
10	FW	(Italy) Sebastian Giovinco	3	0	0	0	0	0	3	0
11	FW	(Canada) Molham Babouli	1	0	0	0	0	0	1	0
14	MF	(Canada) Jay Chapman	1	0	0	0	0	0	1	0
15	DF	(United States) Eriq Zavaleta	2	0	0	0	1	0	3	0
17	FW	(United States) Jozy Altidore	4	0	1	0	0	0	5	0
18	MF	(United States) Marky Delgado	5	0	0	0	0	0	5	0
19	MF	(United States) Daniel Lovitz	1	0	0	0	0	0	1	0
21	MF	(Canada) Jonathan Osorio	2	0	0	0	0	0	2	0
23	DF	(United States) Josh Williams	0	1	0	0	0	0	0	1
24	DF	(Poland) Damien Perquis	3	0	0	0	0	0	3	0
28	DF	(United States) Mark Bloom	1	0	0	0	0	0	1	0
31	MF	(Panama) Armando Cooper	0	0	1	0	0	0	1	0
33	DF	(Iran) Steven Beitashour	5	0	0	0	0	0	5	0
87	FW	(Canada) Tosaint Ricketts	2	1	0	0	0	0	2	1
Total			53	3	4	0	2	0	59	3

== Recognition ==
=== MLS Team of the Week ===
Week	Starters	Bench	Opponent	Link
1	(United States) Drew Moor	(Italy) Sebastian Giovinco	New York Red Bulls	
2		(Canada) Will Johnson, (Italy) Sebastian Giovinco	New York City FC	
6		(United States) Michael Bradley	New England Revolution	
7	(Iran) Steven Beitashour	(United States) Clint Irwin	D.C. United	
8	(United States) Drew Moor, (United States) Michael Bradley, (Italy) Sebastian Giovinco		Montreal Impact	
10	(United States) Clint Irwin, (Poland) Damien Perquis	(Italy) Sebastian Giovinco	FC Dallas	
11	(Italy) Sebastian Giovinco		Vancouver Whitecaps FC	
15	(United States) Drew Moor	(France) Benoît Cheyrou, (Italy) Sebastian Giovinco	LA Galaxy	
16	(United States) Clint Irwin		Orlando City SC	
18	(United States) Justin Morrow		Chicago Fire	
20	(Italy) Sebastian Giovinco		D.C. United	
21	(United States) Drew Moor, (Italy) Sebastian Giovinco	(United States) Marky Delgado	Columbus Crew	
22	(United States) Drew Moor, (Italy) Sebastian Giovinco		Real Salt Lake & New England Revolution	
24	(United States) Jozy Altidore	(United States) Marky Delgado	Philadelphia Union	
27	(United States) Jozy Altidore		Chicago Fire	
28	(United States) Jozy Altidore		New York Red Bulls	
30		(United States) Drew Moor, (United States) Jozy Altidore	Orlando City SC & D.C. United	
34	(Italy) Sebastian Giovinco		Chicago Fire	

=== MLS Player of the Week ===
Week	Player	Week's Statline
20	(Italy) Sebastian Giovinco	3 Goals
22	(Italy) Sebastian Giovinco	3 Goals 1 Assist

=== End of Season awards ===
Award	Player
MLS Best XI	(Italy) Sebastian Giovinco
