= St. Tammany and New Orleans Railways and Ferry Company =

Defunct interurban railway in St. Tammany Parish, Louisiana

Overview
- Status: Defunct
- Owner: St. Tammany and New Orleans Railways and Ferry Company (1906–1915); St. Tammany Railway and Power Company (1915–1918)
- Locale: St. Tammany Parish, Louisiana
- Termini: Covington; Mandeville

Service
- Type: Interurban
- Services: 1
- Rolling stock: Fairbanks-Morse type No. 24 gasoline motor cars (1909–1915); three converted to electric operation 1915

History
- Opened: February 13, 1909
- Closed: June 1918

Technical
- Line length: 13.60 miles (21.89 km)
- Track gauge: 4 ft 8 1/2 in (1,435 mm) standard gauge
- Electrification: Trolley wire, from August 1915

The St. Tammany and New Orleans Railways and Ferry Company, known locally as the Motor Road, was a 13.60-mile interurban railway in St. Tammany Parish, Louisiana, connecting Covington and Abita Springs with a steamship pier at Mandeville on Lake Pontchartrain. Chartered in 1906 by land developers Clay Riggs and Joseph Birg, it opened on February 13, 1909 using gasoline motor cars and was reorganized and electrified in 1915 as the St. Tammany Railway and Power Company. It was the first railway of the interurban type built in Louisiana and the last to adopt electric power. The company entered receivership in January 1918 and its assets were sold for scrap in June 1918, a court-appointed auditor having found that the railway lost $146,973.08 over its nine years of operation.

The railway was built with the aid of special property taxes voted by two parish wards, and was closely tied to the promoters' land holdings along its route.

== Background ==
The north shore of Lake Pontchartrain, marketed as the "Ozone Belt" for its supposedly healthful climate, developed in the late nineteenth century as a resort area serving New Orleans. The East Louisiana Railroad connected New Orleans with Covington and Mandeville in the late 1880s, but was obliged to circumnavigate Lake Pontchartrain; direct steamship service across the lake competed successfully with it. Passengers landing by steamer at Mandeville were poorly served for onward travel to Abita Springs and Covington. In the 1890s a short mule car railway was built out of Abita Springs to reach the East Louisiana Railroad at Three Rivers, about a mile away.

== Promotion and land acquisition ==
A railway from Covington to Mandeville via Abita Springs, with steamship connections to New Orleans, was announced publicly in May 1906. Riggs, described as having engineered the deal, had by then spent twelve months buying land in the Third and Fourth Wards of St. Tammany Parish between Covington, Abita Springs and Mandeville; contemporary reporting noted that the purchases had closed gaps in existing holdings to the point that a rider could travel from Covington to the lakeshore almost entirely on land owned or controlled by the enterprise.

Riggs described a projected 35.5-mile axis running from Canal and Carondelet streets in New Orleans to the Greenlaw Lumber Company mill at Ramsay, four miles north of Covington, and spoke of eventually covering some eighty square miles of the Ozone Belt with electric roads. He argued that cheap and frequent service would allow wage earners as well as men of means to live on the north shore and commute daily to New Orleans.

The charter was executed on May 15, 1906 before Harrison Rankin Warren, clerk of court and ex-officio notary public, at Covington, and recorded in Mortgage Book L of St. Tammany Parish. It fixed the corporation's domicile in Covington, its capital stock at $300,000 in 3,000 shares, and its term at ninety-nine years. Clay Riggs, Joseph Birg and Lewis L. Morgan were named as the first board of directors; the charter was also signed by O.Z. Williams, Warren Thomas, E.J. Frederick, C.S.E. Babington and Harvey E. Ellis.

The objects declared in the charter extended well beyond the railway itself. In addition to constructing and operating a line from Covington to Lake Pontchartrain with connecting boats, the company was authorized to build and operate steamships, docks, wharves and ferries; to establish electric plants and generate and distribute electricity for hire for light, heat and power; to sink wells and sell water; to buy and sell lands for profit.

The company retained substantial real estate throughout its existence. In 1910 the parish press described the Helenburg tract "of the St. Tammany Railways and Ferry Company" as a townsite being promoted to investors, and lots in Covington and Mandeville remained in the company's name at its liquidation in 1918.

The railway's route became the spine of several land promotions. Besides the company's own Helenburg tract, Ozone Park was established about three miles north of Mandeville in 1909 by the Consolidated Land Company of New Orleans, and Alexiusville was promoted by the Joness Real Estate Company. Cottages at Ozone Park were supplied from an artesian well reported in 1910 to flow 180 gallons a minute, and in 1911 about ten acres at Helenburg and Ozone Park were planted in grapes and vegetables under a single manager, with a canning plant contemplated. Lots at Ozone Park appeared in parish tax sale listings through the 1910s.

== Public subsidy ==
The enterprise was financed in part by special property taxes voted by the Third and Fourth Wards of St. Tammany Parish. A first round of elections was held on August 22, 1906, on a levy of five mills for ten years. Both wards approved. In the Third Ward 178 votes were cast in favor and 91 against, representing $175,312 in assessed property value for and $107,720 against; in the Fourth Ward the vote was 134 to 4, representing $96,296 for and $1,780 against. The results were proclaimed on August 24, 1906 by election supervisors Lewis L. Morgan, W. E. Parker and Warren Thomas. Morgan had signed the company's charter as one of its three original directors three months earlier.

A second round followed a year later. On July 9, 1907 the parish Police Jury adopted ordinances calling further special elections for August 20, 1907, this time on a levy of three mills for ten years, capped at $5,000 a year in the Third Ward and $3,000 a year in the Fourth. The petitions were signed by 236 and 104 qualified property taxpayers respectively. Conditions attached to both required that the line be built into the corporate limits of Covington, Abita Springs and Mandeville; that the tax become collectable only after the railway was completed and in operation; and that work commence within ninety days of the promulgation of the result and be completed and in operation within eighteen months thereafter.

Only property taxpayers could vote, and election commissioners recorded the assessed value of each voter's property alongside the ballot, returns being made of both the number of votes and the assessed value for and against.

== Construction and opening ==
Construction began in 1908. Hennick and Charlton record that the promoters spent little time or money on the work: track was laid on level ground with practically no ballast, rails weighed only 45 pounds to the yard, and crossties were placed 3,000 to the mile.

On October 10, 1908 the town of Covington granted a franchise to lay track along its streets, entering the corporate limits on the west bank of the Bogue Falaya River near the south boundary of the Sulphur Springs Addition, then along Dewey Avenue, Lee Ferry Road, Kirkland Street and Theard Avenue to a point near New Hampshire Street, with a wye connection off Kirkland at Columbia Street. The ordinance required rails to be laid level with the street surface and all crossings to be maintained by the company.

In November 1908 the company obtained an injunction in the Twenty-Sixth Judicial District Court restraining the New Orleans Great Northern Railroad from interfering with its crossing of the Great Northern's tracks. The petition recited that the Great Northern had given assurance that no opposition would be made to the crossing, so that no expropriation suit had been filed; that after the crossing was built the Great Northern removed it; and that the company had replaced it and was threatened with its removal again. L. L. Morgan appeared as attorney for the petitioner.

Service between Covington and Mandeville opened on February 13, 1909. Two additional cars and a trailer arrived in March 1909, the trailers being of the open "picnic" type.

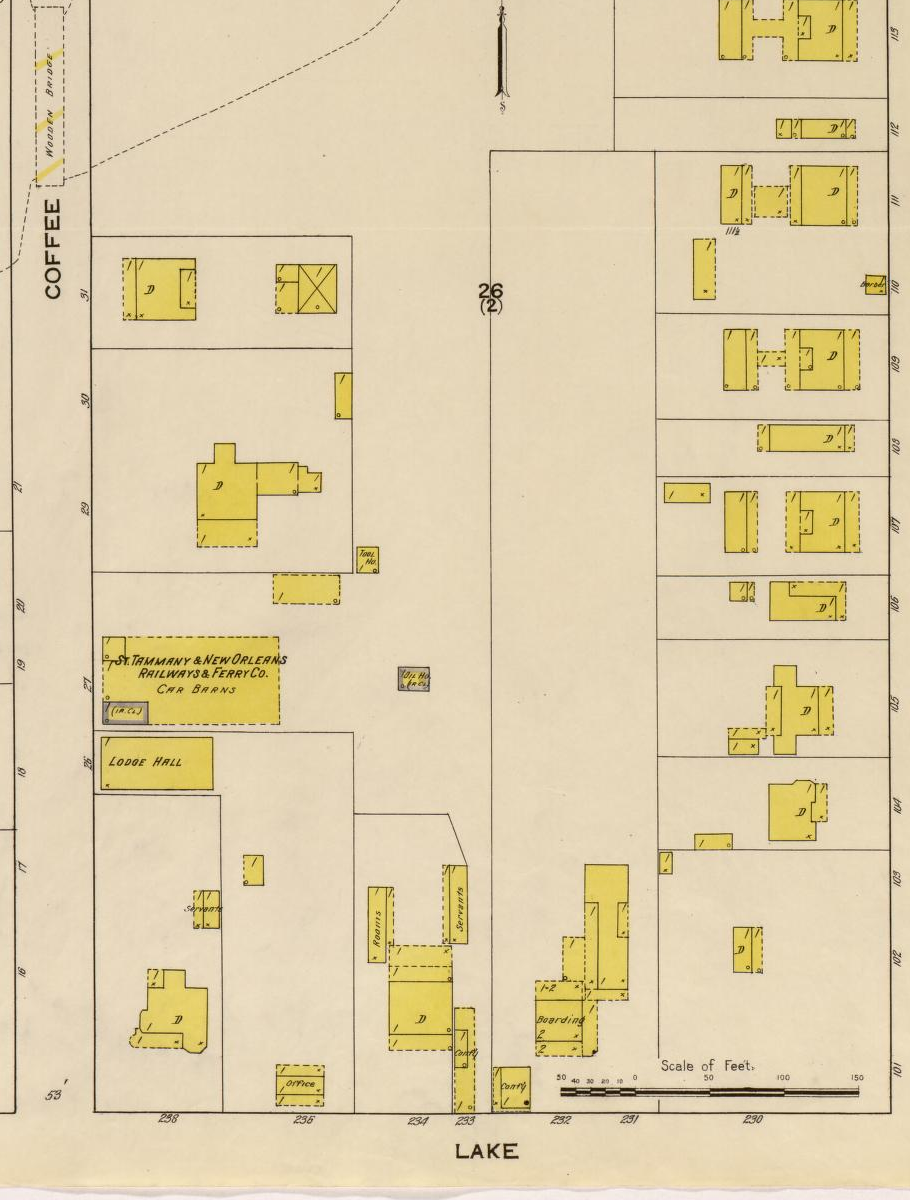
Detail from the Sanborn fire insurance map of Mandeville, Louisiana, June 1915, showing the car barns of the St. Tammany and New Orleans Railroad and Ferry Company on Coffee Street.

== Route ==
The line ran approximately fourteen miles from Covington to Mandeville. From the Covington station at Theard and New Hampshire streets the track ran through the town streets, crossed the Bogue Falaya on a high wooden trestle, extended east about two miles, turned southeast to cross the New Orleans Great Northern, and reached Abita Springs about a mile further. Turning south, it passed Helenburg, Ozone Park, Chinchuba and Hansborough to reach Mandeville, crossing the Abita River at Abita Springs, Pontchatalowa Creek at Ozone Park and Chinchuba Bayou between Chinchuba and Hansborough. Through Mandeville the line ran via Wilkinson, Monroe, Adair, Jefferson, Coffee and Lake streets, then onto a pier extending several hundred feet into Lake Pontchartrain, terminating at a shed and small dock used by the steamships. A Sanborn fire insurance map of Mandeville surveyed in June 1915 shows the company's car barns on Coffee Street.

Published timetables list intermediate stops at Chinchuba, Ozone Park, Helenburg and Abita Springs. There were no operators or agents at intermediate stations.

== Operations, 1909 to 1915 ==
=== Schedules and fares ===
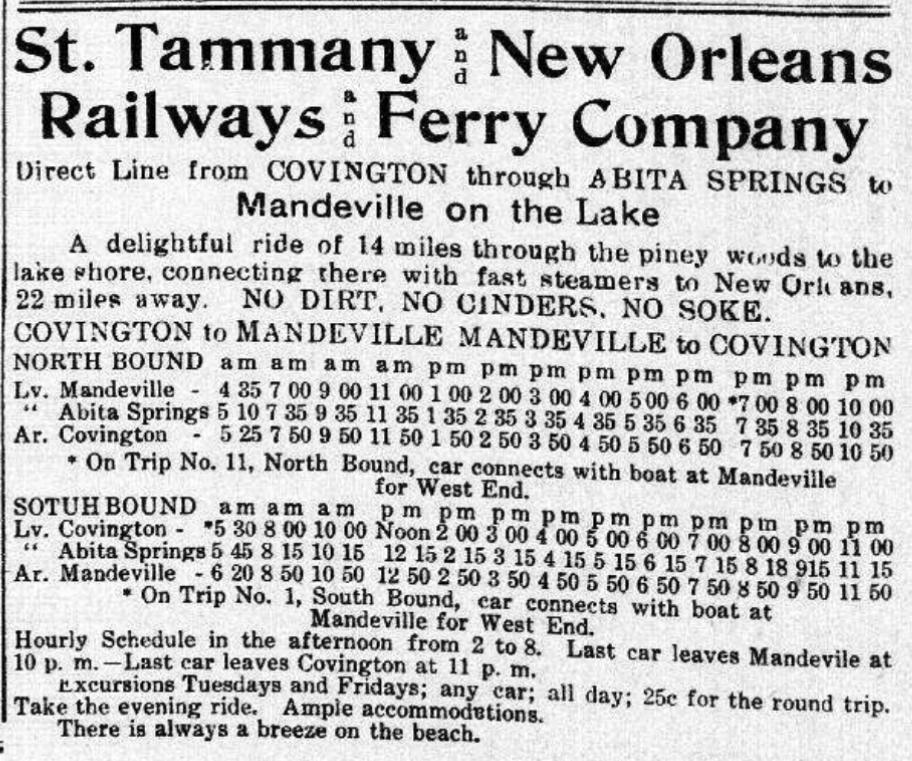
Advertisement and timetable of the St. Tammany and New Orleans Railways and Ferry Company, published in the St. Tammany Farmer, Covington, Louisiana, August 13, 1910.

An August 1910 advertisement lists thirteen trips daily in each direction, with an hourly schedule through the afternoon from 2:00 to 8:00 p.m., the last car leaving Mandeville at 10:00 p.m. and Covington at 11:00 p.m. The company described the line as a fourteen-mile ride through the piney woods to the lake shore, connecting there with fast steamers to New Orleans twenty-two miles away, and advertised "NO DIRT, NO CINDERS, NO SMOKE."

An April 1912 timetable shows eight trips daily in each direction, with a running time of about fifty minutes between Mandeville and Covington. Cars left Abita Springs for Covington 35 minutes after Mandeville departure time and for Mandeville 15 minutes after Covington time. Round trip fares were 45 cents between Mandeville and Covington, 35 cents between Mandeville and Abita Springs, and 15 cents between Covington and Abita Springs, with intermediate travel at three cents a mile and a hundred-mile card available for $1.50.

Service was seasonal. An hourly schedule operated during the summer of 1910 was reduced to weekends only in September 1910 and discontinued in November 1910 in favor of two-hourly headways. By August 1913 the company was advertising hourly service after 1:00 p.m. and half-hourly service on Sundays after 2:00 p.m.

Certain trips connected with the lake steamers, and timetables carried notes to that effect. The connecting boat is identified in 1910 as serving West End and in March 1912 as the steamer Dolive. Hennick and Charlton describe steamship service operated by the Louisiana Steamboat and Ferry Company between Mandeville, Madisonville and Milneburg, latterly by the sidewheeler New Camellia and, from July 1916, the faster Mandeville.

=== Excursion traffic and local relations ===
In May 1909 a correspondent to the St. Tammany Farmer complained that a 50-cent fare differential meant that nine of every ten excursionists arriving by boat remained in Mandeville rather than continuing to Covington or Abita Springs, and argued that the people of those towns had voted the tax specifically to attract that traffic. He called for a combined boat and rail fare matched to the New Orleans Great Northern's, and for hourly summer service.

The company introduced 25-cent round trip excursion tickets between Mandeville, Abita Springs and Covington from May 1, 1910, initially on Tuesdays and Fridays, shifted in September 1910 to Wednesdays, Saturdays and Sundays, and offered daily by 1913, when children under fourteen travelled for ten cents.

In March 1910 the Abita Springs town council held a special meeting for the purpose of notifying the company that it must build its tracks up to the intersection of the New Orleans Great Northern tracks at Level Street; Clay Riggs attended by request. The matter was unresolved when the council changed hands, and in May 1910 the incoming administration voted to take up the company's proposition.

The railway also operated free and special cars for local events, including a 9:30 car during the 1910 Abita Carnival and a free car from Mandeville and Abita during a Karnival Klub entertainment in 1911.

A front-page appreciation in the St. Tammany Farmer in September 1912 defended the tax and argued that without it "we might have waited many years for the motor line, for there was not otherwise trade enough to demand it." The same article described school children travelling into Covington on the eight o'clock car for a nominal five cents round trip regardless of distance, crowding into the front compartment, with girls playing baseball on the Abita station platform while waiting.

=== Equipment ===
The company began operations entirely with gasoline motor cars. Two were ordered from Fairbanks-Morse in 1908 and were the first type No. 24 cars that firm built; two more were ordered later. All four had Brill semi-convertible bodies with "Empire" roofs on Taylor standard trucks, and the company also owned four or more single-truck open crossbench trailers. The gasoline operation gave the railway its "Motor Road" nickname, which the company itself used in advertising. In October 1910 the manager, Clay Riggs, travelled to Chicago to select double vestibule cars intended to protect passengers from drafts and cold.

== Electrification ==
In 1915 the management reorganized the property as the St. Tammany Railway and Power Company, announced plans to equip the existing cars for electric operation, and borrowed $80,000 to accomplish the conversion. Officers of the reorganized company were Joseph Birg, president; Lewis L. Morgan, vice president; Harvey E. Ellis, secretary-treasurer; H. T. Carroll, superintendent; and Dr. Paine, company surgeon.

On June 1, 1915 the town of Covington adopted two ordinances: one granting a twenty-five year franchise, running to May 31, 1940, to erect trolley poles and wires along the company's existing route through the town, and one permitting a passing siding on Kirkland Street between Columbia and Florida streets. Both were signed by Mayor Paul J. Lacroix, who had served on the council that granted the original 1908 track franchise.

Three of the four gasoline motor cars were converted by fitting Baldwin type 54-18-M maximum traction trucks and electrical equipment ordered from the Baldwin Locomotive Works in April 1915; car No. 17 was retained in its original form as a standby. Electric service began in August 1915 with a new schedule effective August 17, offering fourteen daily trips in each direction. Apart from the erection of poles, bonding of rails and stringing of wire, the trackage was largely unaltered. Two power houses were built, at Helenburg and Mandeville, and the company supplied electric power to the town of Mandeville for street lighting in addition to its own use.

A franchise granted by Covington in 1915 also authorized a belt line street railway circulating through the city past St. Paul's College. It was never constructed.

=== Power plant ===
Where other Louisiana street railways and interurban lines used steam boilers and engines to drive their generators, the St. Tammany Railway and Power Company used Allis-Chalmers diesel crude oil engines. Hennick and Charlton describe this as a pioneering arrangement in Louisiana and note that it was not commonly in use elsewhere in the nation in 1915.

== 1915 hurricane ==
The 1915 New Orleans hurricane struck on September 29, 1915, some six weeks after electric service began. The St. Tammany Farmer reported in October that the power plant and rolling stock did not suffer much, but that the road sustained damage mainly to its bridges, especially the Bogue Falaya crossing, and that the company had worked energetically to restore service. During the interruption cars ran only as far as the Bogue Falaya station and school children walked into Covington by way of the road bridge. The same report noted that the company had not yet taken advantage of its franchise over Covington streets.

== Decline and receivership ==
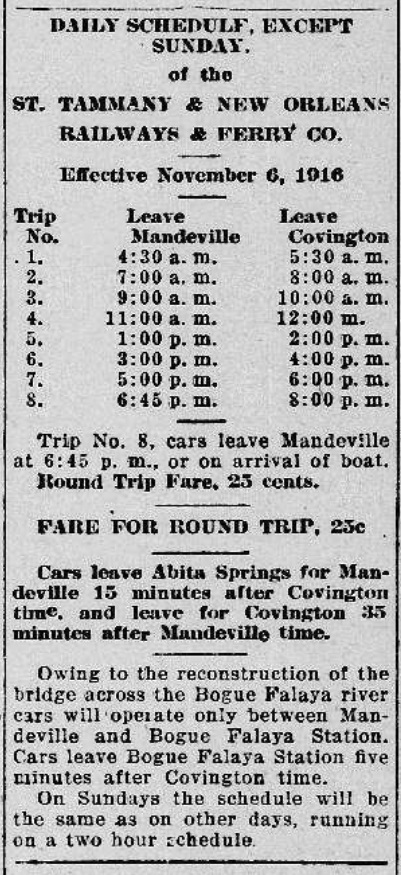
Timetable of the St. Tammany and New Orleans Railways and Ferry Company effective November 6, 1916, as published in the St. Tammany Farmer, Covington, Louisiana, April 28, 1917.

Signs of financial difficulty appeared early. The company was listed for delinquent taxes in November 1910, on an assessment of $7,630 with taxes and costs of $88.49. Judgments were rendered against it in favor of Joseph Smith in 1907 and of the Lacey Lumber Company in 1911, the latter including $500 on a reconventional demand.

A timetable effective November 6, 1916 and still current in April 1917 noted that owing to reconstruction of the bridge over the Bogue Falaya River, cars operated only between Mandeville and Bogue Falaya Station, short of Covington. Service had by then been reduced to eight trips daily at two-hour headways.

The company had been granted a ten-year reprieve from state taxes covering the years 1908 to 1918, and the taxes charged by the parish and by Mandeville were very low, Mandeville's annual charge being $185.35. Hennick and Charlton record that the railway reached a financial crisis in 1917, and that on January 15, 1918 the St. Tammany Railway and Power Company fell into the hands of receivers, the state tax having become payable for the first time in a sum of $602.18 that the company could not raise; the court subsequently dated the receivership from January 16, 1918. By 1918 an average of 25.3 passengers were carried per round trip at an average gross of $2.69, against average daily out-of-pocket losses of $25.60, and one car had been cannibalized to keep two others in service.

The receivership proceeded in the Twenty-Sixth Judicial District Court as Joseph Birg vs. St. Tammany and New Orleans Railways and Ferry Company, No. 2902, with Whitaker Riggs, Sr. as receiver. An inventory was made by notary Karl J. Kohnke and filed on April 9, 1918, and on April 15, 1918 Judge Prentiss B. Carter ordered a public sale. The sale was advertised for June 1, 1918 at the courthouse door in Covington, offering the company's assets as a going concern and as a whole: 13.60 miles of electric railroad, rolling stock, rights of way, franchises, terminal rights, the power house and electric lighting plant, poles and wires, tools, the electric lighting contract with the town of Mandeville, the Mandeville wharf and pier, and real estate including three lots in Mandeville and six blocks in Garaland's Addition to Covington and Claiborne.

The sale drew no bidders after due advertising. The court thereupon revoked the receiver's authority to continue operating the road and ordered the company's charter and franchise cancelled and surrendered and its corporate existence terminated, authorizing Riggs to retain three watchmen at $1.50 a day and a bookkeeper at up to $75 a month to guard the property pending liquidation. The court recited that during the receivership operating expenses had exceeded receipts by $4,062.69 in the first three months, a daily average deficit of $45.14; that a receiver's certificate for $3,000 had been issued and tax subsidy of $2,821.72 received for 1917 and up to April 1918; that experts appointed by the court found $30,000 would be required to put the road in condition for operation; that a tax subsidy of $6,373.00 would cease after 1918 while property previously exempt would become liable for $1,500; and that the road would show an annual loss of $20,000. It further found that after deducting the tax subsidy the railway had lost $146,973.08 since it began operating on February 13, 1909. Loss of the tax subsidy, increased taxation and what the court called impossible labor conditions were cited as making continued operation a great loss, and continued operation would exhaust the company's resources and leave creditors and bondholders without recourse.

Hennick and Charlton record that the District Court ordered the company to cease operations and surrender its franchises and charter on June 4, 1918, and that on June 24 the railway was sold to the Walter A. Zelnicker Supply Company of St. Louis for scrap, realizing $86,900, with the property used to supply electric power to Mandeville sold to E. V. Richard.

== Aftermath ==
Reporting on the surrender of the charter in June 1918 noted that the road would probably be put up for sale again and that there was talk of various schemes for its purchase and reconstruction to Madisonville or other points, though nothing was definitely known of these plans.

In October 1918 the Covington Association of Commerce convened a public meeting at the parish courthouse with W. E. Dudenbostel, representing the Zelnicker company, to discuss returning the road to operation and extending it to Madisonville. A committee was appointed consisting of A. Mutti and Mayor Hordes of Abita Springs, Herman Levy and Mr. Fassman of Mandeville, and Lewis L. Morgan and E. J. Domergue of Covington. The committee put three questions to the purchasers, each turning on whether the affected towns would again vote a special tax in aid of construction and operation.

== Legacy ==
Hennick and Charlton, writing in the 1960s, recorded that the brick building housing the company's power station was still standing at Helenburg, and that rotting pilings of the railway-steamship pier at Mandeville could still be seen. They also noted that despite extensive research no photograph had ever been found showing a car of the line after electrification, only of the gasoline cars.

== See also ==
- Abita Springs, Louisiana
- Covington, Louisiana
- Mandeville, Louisiana
