= Roberto Vega Galina =

Mexican physician and labor leader

Roberto Javier Vega y Galina is a Mexican physician and labor leader who is the current secretary general of the National Social Security Workers Union (SNTSS).

Vega y Galina studied medicine at the Universidad Autónoma de Puebla. He has occupied different positions in the National Social Security Workers Union (SNTSS) including secretary general. He was an active member of the Institutional Revolutionary Party (PRI) and in 2003 gained a seat in the LIX Legislature of the Mexican Chamber of Deputies via proportional representation. Recently he lost a very important negotiation with the Mexican government about the retirement benefits of the social security union workers. He resigned from the PRI on March 28, 2006 after being denied another proportional representation seat.

In 2006 he unsuccessfully ran for a seat in the Senate of Mexico via proportional representation representing the Party of the Democratic Revolution (PRD).
