= Mark Delgado =

American soccer player (born 1995)

- Delgado with Los Angeles FC in 2026

Personal information
- Full name: Marco Antonio Delgado
- Date of birth: May 16, 1995 (age 31)
- Place of birth: Glendora, California, U.S.
- Height: 5 ft 9 in (1.75 m)
- Position: Midfielder

Team information
- Current team: Los Angeles FC
- Number: 8

Youth career
- Pomona United
- 2009–2010: LAFC Chelsea
- 2010–2011: IMG Soccer Academy
- 2011: Cosmos Academy West
- 2011–2012: Chivas USA

Senior career*
Years	Team	Apps	(Gls)
2012–2014	Chivas USA	37	(2)
2015–2021	Toronto FC	181	(15)
2017	→ Toronto FC II (loan)	1	(0)
2022–2024	LA Galaxy	91	(5)
2025–	Los Angeles FC	66	(5)

International career^{‡}
2011	United States U17	4	(0)
2012	United States U18	1	(0)
2014–2015	United States U20	5	(0)
2018	United States	6	(0)
- * Club domestic league appearances and goals as of November 7, 2026 ‡ National team caps and goals as of November 20, 2018

Marco Antonio Delgado (born May 16, 1995), known as Mark Delgado or Marky Delgado, is an American professional soccer player who plays as a midfielder for Major League Soccer club Los Angeles FC.

== Early life ==
Delgado grew up watching his two older brothers soccer games and watching Liga MX games on television with his father. Delgado began playing soccer at the age of four with children two to three years older, after a coach saw him playing with a ball while at his older brother's soccer game. Delgado grew up playing in the Pomona United Youth Soccer League and when he was 14, switched to the Cosmos West Academy. The next year, he joined U.S. Soccer's U-17 residency program, spending two semesters before returning home.

In 2011, Delgado had established himself in the Southern California youth soccer scene and faced a difficult decision decided which Los Angeles–based MLS academy to join – Chivas USA or the LA Galaxy, ultimately deciding to join Chivas. After attending the Generation Adidas Cup with the Chivas academy, he was invited to the first team training. At age 16, he was playing with the Chivas U19 team and training with the MLS squad.

== Club career ==
=== Chivas USA ===
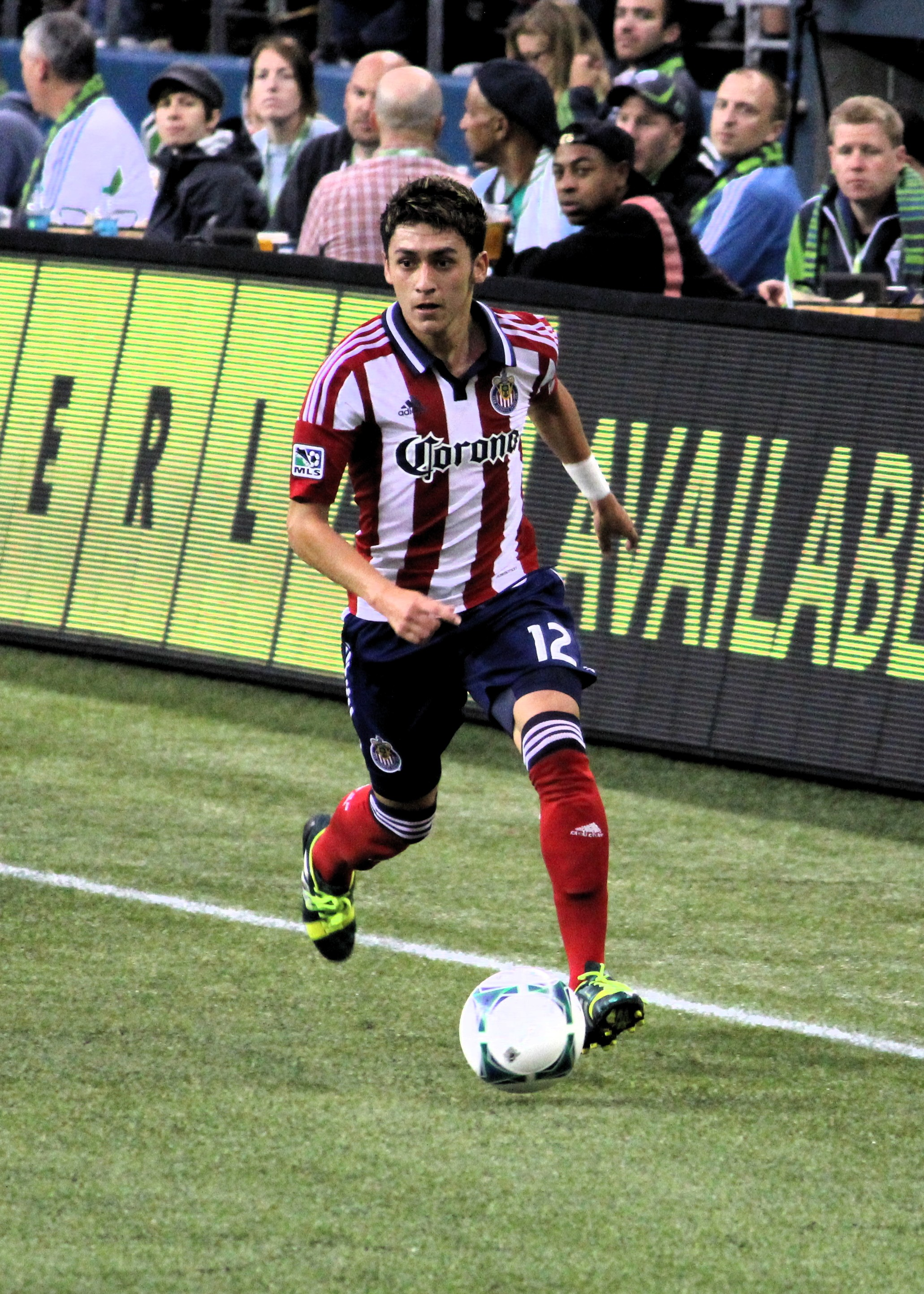
Delgado with Chivas USA in 2013

Delgado was signed by Chivas USA as a Home Grown Player on April 2, 2012. Delgado made his professional debut on October 4, 2012, during a 4–0 defeat to Vancouver Whitecaps FC, coming on as a 73rd-minute substitute.

=== Toronto FC ===
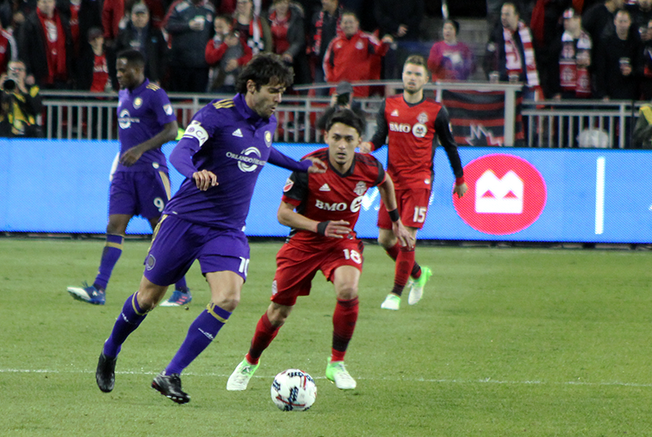
Delgado defending Kaká in match against Orlando City

After the folding of Chivas USA in November 2014, Delgado was selected by Toronto FC in the 2014 MLS Dispersal Draft.

He made his debut for Toronto FC in May 2015 in the 2015 Canadian Championship. On July 12, 2015, he scored his first goal for Toronto in a 4–4 draw against New York City FC at Yankee Stadium. On July 20, 2015, Delgado was named to the MLS Team of the Week.

Delgado was again named to the MLS Team of the Week on August 1 and August 22, 2016. On October 18, 2016, Delgado re-signed with Toronto FC on a multi-year deal.

=== LA Galaxy ===
On January 21, 2022, Delgado was traded to return to his home state to play for LA Galaxy.

=== Los Angeles FC ===
On January 22, 2025, Delgado was traded to the crosstown rival club Los Angeles FC.

== International career ==
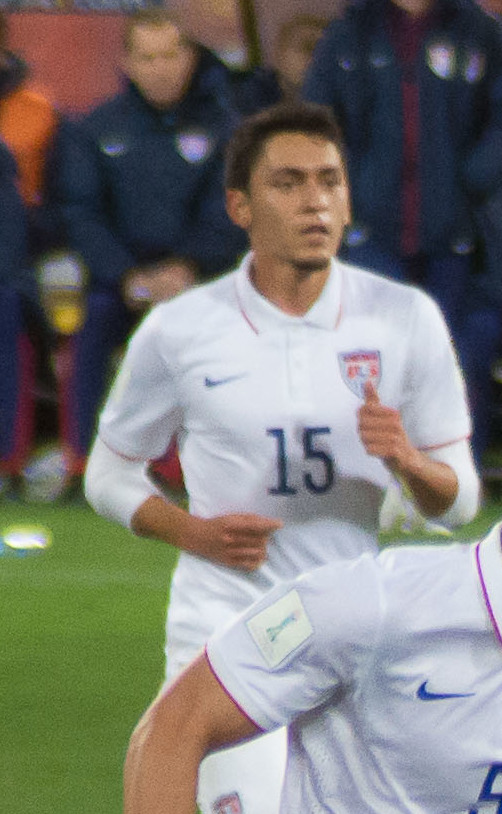
Delgado with the U.S. national team

Delgado was born in the United States to Mexican parents, making him eligible to represent Mexico as well as the United States. At 13, he spent time with the U.S. U15 team and was part of the American U-17 residency program in Bradenton, Florida in 2010 and 2011. Delgado has represented the United States at the under-17, under-18 and under-20 levels. On January 8, 2018, Delgado received a call-up for the senior team for a friendly against Bosnia and Herzegovina.

He made his United States national team debut in a 1–0 friendly win against Paraguay on March 27, 2018. He started the match and helped win the decisive penalty, which was converted by Bobby Wood; he came off in the 86th minute for fellow senior team debutant Timothy Weah.

== Career statistics ==
=== Club ===
As of match played November 7, 2026

Appearances and goals by club, season and competition
Club	Season	League			Playoffs (Note: Includes MLS Cup playoffs)		National cup (Note: Includes U.S. Open Cup and Canadian Championship)		Continental (Note: Includes CONCACAF Champions League/Cup)		Other		Total	
Club	Season	Division	Apps	Goals	Apps	Goals	Apps	Goals	Apps	Goals	Apps	Goals	Apps	Goals
Chivas USA	2012	MLS	1	0	—		0	0	—		—		1	0
Chivas USA	2013	MLS	16	0	—		0	0	—		—		16	0
Chivas USA	2014	MLS	20	2	—		1	0	—		—		21	2
Chivas USA	Total		37	2	—		1	0	—		—		38	2
Toronto FC	2015	MLS	20	3	1	0	1	0	—		—		22	3
Toronto FC	2016	MLS	28	2	1	0	3	0	—		—		32	2
Toronto FC	2017	MLS	26	3	5	0	3	1	—		—		34	4
Toronto FC	2018	MLS	28	2	0	0	4	0	8	0	1 (Note: Appearance in Campeones Cup)	0	41	2
Toronto FC	2019	MLS	30	2	4	1	3	0	2	0	—		39	3
Toronto FC	2020	MLS	19 (Note: Includes three appearances in MLS is Back Tournament group stage)	0	0	0	0	0	—		1 (Note: Appearance in MLS is Back Tournament knockout stage)	0	20	0
Toronto FC	2021	MLS	30	3	0	0	3	0	4	0	—		37	3
Toronto FC	Total		181	15	11	1	17	1	14	0	2	0	225	17
Toronto FC II (loan)	2017	USL	1	0	—		—		—		—		1	0
LA Galaxy	2022	MLS	29	2	2	0	1	0	—		—		32	2
LA Galaxy	2023	MLS	30	2	—		3	0	—		0	0	33	2
LA Galaxy	2024	MLS	32	1	5	0	—		—		3 (Note: Appearances in Leagues Cup)	0	40	1
LA Galaxy	Total		91	5	7	0	4	0	—		3	0	105	5
Los Angeles FC	2025	MLS	34	3	3	0	—		6	1	7 (Note: One appearance in FIFA Club World Cup play-in, three appearances in FIFA Club World Cup, three appearances in Leagues Cup)	0	50	4
Los Angeles FC	2026	MLS	32	2	0	0	—		7	0	3	0	42	2
Los Angeles FC	Total		66	5	3	0	—		13	1	10	0	92	6
Career total			376	27	21	1	22	1	27	1	15	0	461	30

=== International ===
As of match played November 20, 2018

Appearances and goals by national team and year
National team	Year	Apps	Goals
United States	2018	6	0
Total		6	0

Source: US Soccer

== Honors ==
Toronto FC

- MLS Cup: 2017
- Supporters' Shield: 2017
- Canadian Championship: 2016, 2017, 2018
- Eastern Conference (Playoffs): 2016, 2017, 2019

LA Galaxy

- MLS Cup: 2024
