= Leandro Barrera =

Argentine footballer (born 1991)

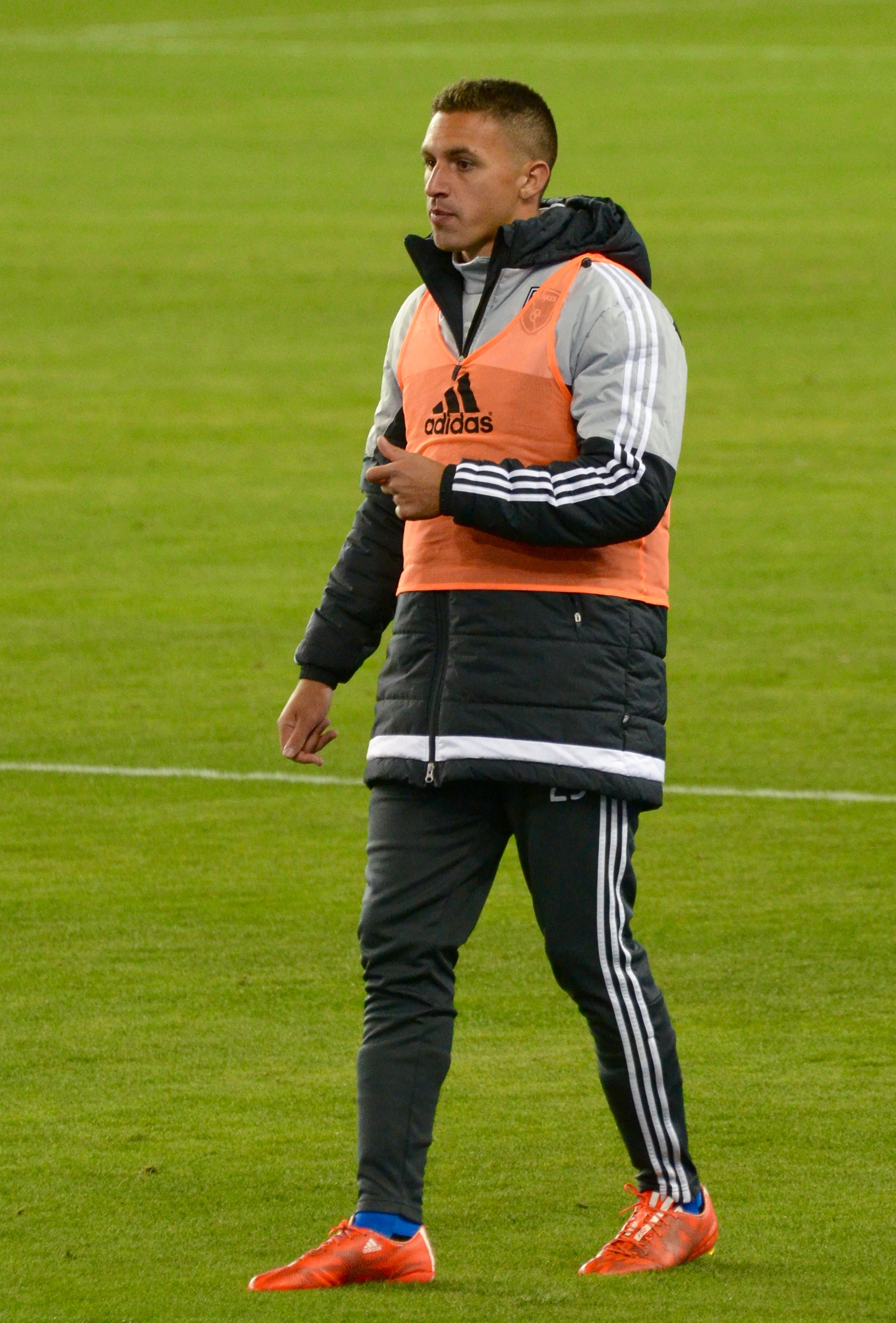
- Barrera with San Jose Earthquakes in 2015

Personal information
- Full name: Leandro Barrera
- Date of birth: February 22, 1991 (age 35)
- Place of birth: Godoy Cruz, Mendoza, Argentina
- Height: 1.73 m (5 ft 8 in)
- Position: Forward

Team information
- Current team: San Martín Mendoza

Youth career
- Argentinos Juniors

Senior career*
Years	Team	Apps	(Gls)
2010–2014	Argentinos Juniors	42	(3)
2014	→ Chivas USA (loan)	32	(1)
2015–2017	San Jose Earthquakes	6	(0)
2016	→ San Martín SJ (loan)	0	(0)
2016–2017	→ Chacarita Juniors (loan)	23	(1)
2017–2018	All Boys	21	(1)
2018–2020	Marítimo	29	(2)
2019	Marítimo B	2	(0)
2020	→ Mafra (loan)	3	(0)
2020–2022	Santiago Morning	46	(8)
2023	Peñarol de Chimbas	16	(1)
2024	Deportes Santa Cruz	25	(3)
2025	Cobreloa	13	(0)
2026–	San Martín Mendoza	0	(0)
- * Club domestic league appearances and goals as of 28 January 2026

Leandro Iván Barrera (born February 22, 1991) is an Argentine football forward for San Martín de Mendoza.

== Career ==
Barrera began his career in the renowned youth ranks of Argentinos Juniors, making his debut in the Primera Division Argentina in 2010. Pedro Troglio handed Barrera his first team debut against Club Atlético Huracán as he came in for Andrés Romero. With Argentinos Barrera made 42 league appearances and scored three goals.

Barrera was loaned to Chivas USA of Major League Soccer on February 19, 2014, with Chivas having an option to purchase the player.

Following the 2014 season, the Chivas USA franchise was contracted by MLS. In November 2014, Barrera was available to other MLS clubs in the 2014 MLS Dispersal Draft but was not selected. In December 2014, Barrera was selected by San Jose Earthquakes in the MLS Waiver Draft.

On 25 June 2018 Leandro Barrera signed a three-year professional contract with Marítimo.

Barrera signed with Chilean club Cobreloa for the 2025 season, his third club in that country after Santiago Morning in 2020–2022 and Deportes Santa Cruz in 2024.

Back to Argentina, Barrera joined San Martín de Mendoza in January 2026.

== Personal life ==
Leandro is the eldest brother of the footballers Pablo, Emiliano, Agustín and Santiago Barrera.

== Honours ==
Argentinos Juniors

- Argentine Primera División: 2009–10 Clausura
