= Margaux Fragoso =

American writer

- Born: Margaux Artemia Fragoso; April 15, 1979; West New York, New Jersey, U.S.
- Died: June 23, 2017 (aged 38); Mandeville, Louisiana, U.S.
- Education: New Jersey City University; Binghamton University
- Spouses: Steve McGowan (divorced) Tom O'Connor (m. 2010)
- Children: 1
- Writing career
- Language: English
- Years active: 2011–17
- Genre: Autobiography
- Notable works: Tiger, Tiger: A Memoir

Margaux Artemia Fragoso (/ˈmɑːrɡoʊ frəˈɡoʊsoʊ/ MAR-goh frə-GOH-soh; April 15, 1979 – June 23, 2017) was an American author, best known for the memoir Tiger, Tiger.

== Early life ==
Fragoso was born to a working-class family and grew up in Union City, New Jersey. Her father was a Puerto Rican jeweler who had a bad temper and drank heavily. Her mother, who was of Swedish, Norwegian, and Japanese descent, suffered from severe mental illness, necessitating several hospitalizations. From the age of seven, Fragoso was groomed and sexually abused by a middle-aged man, given the pseudonym "Peter Curran" in her memoir Tiger, Tiger.

== Career ==
Fragoso attended New Jersey City University and then Binghamton University, earning a Ph.D. in 2009. In 2011, she published Tiger, Tiger: A Memoir, which became a bestseller.

== Personal life and death ==
Fragoso was married twice. With her first husband, Steve McGowan, she had a daughter. In 2010, she married her second husband, Tom O'Connor.

She died of ovarian cancer in 2017, aged 38.
