= Valdemar Gutiérrez Fragoso =

Mexican politician

- Born: 27 December 1956 (age 69); Mexico City, Mexico
- Occupation: Politician
- Political party: PAN

Valdemar Gutiérrez Fragoso (born 27 December 1956) is a Mexican politician from the National Action Party. From 2009 to 2012 he served as Deputy of the LXI Legislature of the Mexican Congress representing the Federal District.
