= Dani Fragoso =

Spanish footballer (born 1982)

Personal information
- Full name: Daniel Fragoso Escribano
- Date of birth: 31 March 1982 (age 44)
- Place of birth: Mataró, Spain
- Height: 1.80 m (5 ft 11 in)
- Position: Midfielder

Team information
- Current team: Betis B (manager)

Youth career
- Espanyol
- Real Madrid

Senior career*
Years	Team	Apps	(Gls)
2000–2001	Espanyol B	5	(0)
2001–2002	Alcorcón	20	(1)
2002–2004	Extremadura	68	(1)
2004–2006	Barcelona B	83	(3)
2007	Ciudad Murcia	18	(0)
2007–2008	Granada 74	19	(1)
2008–2010	Cádiz	79	(3)
2010–2011	Albacete	22	(0)
2011–2012	Melilla	45	(0)
2013	Atlético Baleares	17	(0)
2013–2014	Hospitalet	16	(2)
2014	Chivas USA	2	(0)
2014–2015	Lleida Esportiu	28	(0)
2015–2016	San Roque	30	(0)
2016–2017	La Roda	31	(0)
2017	Cacereño	4	(0)
2017–2019	Jaén	67	(1)
Total		554	(12)

Managerial career
- 2019–2025: Betis (youth)
- 2025–: Betis B
- * Club domestic league appearances and goals

Daniel 'Dani' Fragoso Escribano (born 31 March 1982) is a Spanish former footballer who played as a defensive midfielder, and is currently the manager of Betis Deportivo Balompié.

== Club career ==
Born in Mataró, Barcelona, Catalonia, Fragoso played youth football for RCD Espanyol and Real Madrid. He made his senior debut with the former's B-team during the 2000–01 season, in Segunda División B, and spent most of his career in that tier, representing CF Extremadura, FC Barcelona B, Cádiz CF, UD Melilla, CD Atlético Baleares, CE L'Hospitalet, Lleida Esportiu and La Roda CF.

At the professional level, Fragoso appeared for Ciudad de Murcia – later renamed Granada 74 CF – Cádiz and Albacete Balompié, being relegated with all the clubs from Segunda División. With the second, he only missed two league games during the 2009–10 campaign, scoring in a 4–3 home win against Albacete.

On 3 March 2014, aged nearly 32, Fragoso moved abroad for the first time in his career, signing with Chivas USA in the Major League Soccer. Just five weeks later, however, he was waived, returning to his homeland and joining Lleida.

== Coaching career ==
Shortly after retiring in 2019, Fragoso joined the youth structure at Real Betis, where he would work for five seasons, before taking charge of the Juvenil División de Honor team during the 2024–25 season. On 26 December 2025, Fragoso replaced the sacked Javi Medina at Betis Deportivo Balompié in Group 2 of the Primera Federación, with the side occupying last place in the standings.

== Managerial statistics ==
As of 16 May 2026

Managerial record by team and tenure
Team	Nat	From	To	Record								Ref
Team	Nat	From	To	G	W	D	L	GF	GA	GD	Win %	Ref
Betis B	(Spain)	26 December 2025	Present	20	10	3	7	35	33	+2	50.00	
Total				20	10	3	7	35	33	+2	50.00	—

== Honours ==
Cádiz

- Segunda División B: 2008–09
