= Bobby Burling =

American soccer player

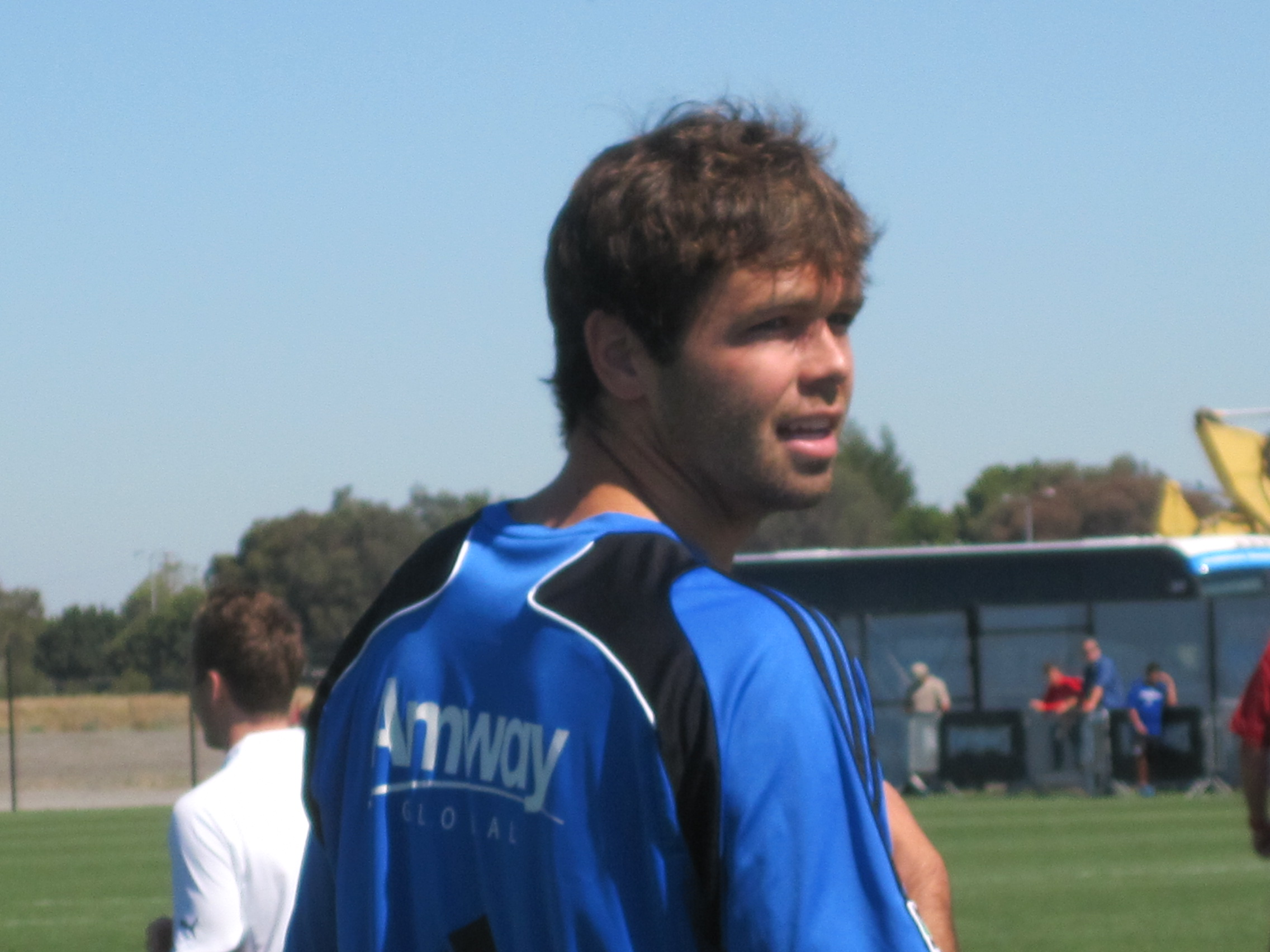
- Burling in July 2010.

Personal information
- Full name: Robert Charles Burling
- Date of birth: October 15, 1984 (age 42)
- Place of birth: Clear Lake City, Texas, United States
- Height: 6 ft 4 in (1.93 m)
- Position: Defender

College career
Years	Team	Apps	(Gls)
2003–2006	Loyola Marymount Lions	80	(15)

Senior career*
Years	Team	Apps	(Gls)
2004	Colorado Springs Blizzard	14	(1)
2007–2009	Chivas USA	23	(0)
2009–2011	San Jose Earthquakes	48	(1)
2012–2014	Chivas USA	48	(1)
2015–2017	Colorado Rapids	50	(3)
- * Club domestic league appearances and goals as of 16:09, 2 May 2018 (UTC)

Robert Charles Burling (born October 15, 1984) is an American former professional soccer player who played as a defender.

== Career ==
=== College ===
Burling played college soccer at Loyola Marymount University and with Colorado Springs Blizzard in the USL Premier Development League before being drafted in the 4th round (45th overall) by Los Angeles Galaxy in the 2007 MLS Superdraft.

=== Professional ===
Burling was not offered a contract by Galaxy, and instead signed for Chivas USA three months later. He made over twenty appearances for Chivas, but did not score a goal. Burling was traded to San Jose Earthquakes on September 11, 2009, in exchange for a third-round pick in the 2010 MLS SuperDraft.

Burling was left exposed by San Jose in the 2011 MLS Expansion Draft and was selected by expansion side Montreal Impact. He never signed with Montreal and his rights were traded to Chivas USA for one season's use of an international roster slot on July 6, 2012. Burling officially signed with Chivas USA on August 17, 2012.

Following the 2014 season, the Chivas USA franchise was contracted by MLS and Burling was made available to other MLS clubs in the 2014 MLS Dispersal Draft. He was not selected. In December 2014, he was selected by Colorado Rapids in the MLS Waiver Draft. He was not retained for the 2018 season.
