= 2012 Chivas USA season =

Chivas USA
2012 season
- Owner: Jorge Vergara
- Coach: Robin Fraser
- Stadium: Home Depot Center
- Major League Soccer: Conference: 9th Overall: 18th
- MLS Cup Playoffs: Did not qualify
- U.S. Open Cup: Semi-finalist
- California SuperClásico: Lost (1–2–0)
- Top goalscorer: League: Juan Pablo Ángel (4 goals); All: Juan Pablo Ángel (5 goals)
- Highest home attendance: 18,800 vs. Los Angeles Galaxy (May 19; MLS Regular Season)
- Lowest home attendance: 7,723 vs. Vancouver Whitecaps (March 17; MLS Regular Season)
- Average home league attendance: League: 13,436; All: 13,436
Home colors	Away colors

The 2012 Chivas USA season was the club's eighth year of existence. It was the club's eighth consecutive season in Major League Soccer, the top division in American soccer. Chivas USA competed in Major League Soccer's Western Conference.

== Overview ==
=== Allocation ranking ===
Chivas USA is in the #5 position in the MLS Allocation Ranking. The allocation ranking is the mechanism used to determine which MLS club has first priority to acquire a U.S. National Team player who signs with MLS after playing abroad, or a former MLS player who returns to the league after having gone to a club abroad for a transfer fee. A ranking can be traded, provided that part of the compensation received in return is another club's ranking.

=== International roster spots ===
Chivas USA has 9 MLS International Roster Slots for use in the 2012 season. Each club in Major League Soccer is allocated 8 international roster spots and Chivas USA acquired a permanent additional spot from Real Salt Lake in 2004.

=== Future draft pick trades ===
Future picks acquired: None.
Future picks traded: *2013 MLS SuperDraft Round 2 pick to New England Revolution.

== Transfers ==
=== In ===
Date	Number	Position	Player	Previous club	Fee/notes	Ref
November 23, 2011	7	DF	(United States) James Riley	Montreal Impact	Traded for Justin Braun and Gerson Mayen	
November 27, 2011	22	MF	(England) Ryan Smith	Sporting Kansas City	Traded for 1st and 3rd round selections in the Supplemental Draft	
December 21, 2011	8	MF	(Ecuador) Oswaldo Minda	(Ecuador) Deportivo Quito	Undiscolsed	
January 11, 2012	17	FW	(Ecuador) Miler Bolaños	(Ecuador) LDU Quito	Loan	
January 12, 2012	14	FW	(United States) Casey Townsend	Maryland Terrapins	2012 MLS SuperDraft	
January 17, 2012	28	GK	(United States) Tim Melia		Free	
January 24, 2012	5	DF	(Colombia) John Alexander Valencia	(Colombia) Junior	Undisclosed	
January 24, 2012	26	MF	(El Salvador) Marvin Iraheta	New York Cosmos U-23	Free	
February 22, 2012	4	DF	(United States) Rauwshan McKenzie	Real Salt Lake	Free	
February 22, 2012	6	MF	(United States) Peter Vagenas	Real Salt Lake	Vancouver Whitecaps FC	
February 22, 2012	58	FW	(United States) Cesar Romero	(Mexico) Murciélagos	Free	
March 10, 2012	24	GK	(United States) Patrick McLain	Cal Poly Mustangs	Free	
March 16, 2012	2	DF	(United States) Scott Gordon	Fort Lauderdale Strikers	Free	
April 2, 2012	25	MF	(United States) Marco Delgado	Chivas USA Academy	Promoted	
April 10, 2012	30	MF	(Uruguay) Paolo Cardozo	LA Galaxy	Traded for David Lopes	
April 16, 2012	27	FW	(Colombia) José Correa	(Colombia) Boyacá Chicó	Undisclosed	
May 17, 2012	11	FW	(United States) Juan Agudelo	New York Red Bulls	Traded for Heath Pearce and allocation money	
May 17, 2012	23	DF	(United States) Danny Califf	Philadelphia Union	Traded for Michael Lahoud and allocation money	
July 6, 2012	2	DF	(United States) Bobby Burling	Montreal Impact	Traded for an international roster slot	
August 1, 2012	18	MF	(Grenada) Shalrie Joseph	New England Revolution	Traded for Blair Gavin, a SuperDraft pick and allocation money	

=== Trial ===
Date In	Date Out	Position	Player	Previous club	Fee/notes	Ref
January 16, 2012	February 6, 2012	DF	(United States) Fabian Kling	Fort Lewis College	Supplemental Draft	
January 16, 2012	March 15, 2012	MF	(Mexico) Pablo Sandoval			
January 16, 2012	May 21, 2012	DF	(United States) Mario Ledezma	(Mexico) Guadalajara	Free Agent	
January 17, 2012	March 15, 2012	DF	(United States) R. J. Allen	Monmouth Hawks	Supplemental Draft	
February 22, 2012	March 15, 2012	MF	(Brazil) Alan	(Cyprus) AEK Larnaca	Free Agent	
February 22, 2012	March 15, 2012	MF	(Colombia) José Manuel Nájera	(Colombia) Real Cartagena	Free Agent	
February 22, 2012	March 15, 2012	FW	(United States) Karo Okiomah	High Point Panthers	Supplemental Draft	
March 9, 2012	March 23, 2012	FW	(Nigeria) John Owoeri	(Egypt) Ismaily	Free Agent	
March 9, 2012	May 21, 2012	MF	(Mexico) Ernesto Hutchinson		Free Agent	
March 15, 2012	March 20, 2012	MF	(United States) Kevin Huezo	(Mexico) Pachuca	Free Agent	
March 16, 2012	March 28, 2012	DF	(Democratic Republic of the Congo) Patrick Kanyuka	(England) Tamworth	Free Agent	
March 16, 2012	March 28, 212	MF	(United States) Rodrigo López	Portland Timbers	Free Agent	
March 16, 2012	May 21, 2012	MF	(United States) Cameron Artigliere	(Germany) Rheydt SV		
March 16, 2012	May 21, 2012	MF	(United States) Matthew Dallman	(Germany) Sportfreunde Siegen	Free Agernt	
March 28, 2012	May 21, 2012	DF	(Mexico) Gerardo Daniel Torres	Sensifut Academy	Partnership	
March 28, 2012	May 21, 2012	DF	(Mexico) Javier Mena	Sensifut Academy	Partnership	
March 28, 2012	May 21, 2012	MF	(Mexico) Victor Manuel Chavez	Sensifut Academy	Partnership	
March 28, 2012	May 21, 2012	FW	(Mexico) Jorge Márquez	Sensifut Academy	Partnership	
May 28, 2012		MF	(Scotland) Scott Morrison	(Scotland) Ross County	Free Agent	
June 14, 2012		FW	(Germany) Sebastian Stachnik	(Netherlands) Helmond Sport	Free Agent	
June 14, 2012		MF	(Brazil) Tiago Luzardi		Free Agent	

=== Out ===
Date	Number	Position	Player	New club	Fee/notes	Ref
November 23, 2011	17	FW	(United States) Justin Braun	Montreal Impact	Traded for James Riley	
November 23, 2011		DF	(El Salvador) Gerson Mayen	Montreal Impact	Traded for James Riley	
November 23, 2011	20	DF	(United States) Zarek Valentin	Montreal Impact	MLS Expansion Draft	
November 29, 2011	5	MF	(Brazil) Paulo Nagamura	Sporting Kansas City	Traded for MLS Supplemental Draft 1st round pick	
December 12, 2011	2	DF	(New Zealand) Andrew Boyens	LA Galaxy	Re-Entry Draft	
December 12, 2011		FW	(United States) Chukwudi Chijindu	Wilmington Hammerheads	Option Declined	
December 12, 2011	7	MF	(New Zealand) Simon Elliott		Contract Expired	
December 12, 2011	22	GK	(United States) Zach Thornton		Option Declined	
December 12, 2011	8	DF	(Mexico) Mariano Trujillo		Option Declined	
January 1, 2012	4	DF	(Costa Rica) Michael Umaña	(Guatemala) Comunicaciones	Free	
January 4, 2012	23	FW	(Argentina) Marcos Mondaini	(Uruguay) Fénix	Loan Return	
January 4, 2012	30	GK	(Mexico) Sergio Arias	(Mexico) Guadalajara	Loan Return	
January 4, 2012	99	FW	(Ecuador) Víctor Estupiñán	(Ecuador) Universidad Católica	Option Declined	
February 26, 2012	27	FW	(United States) Chris Cortez	(Mexico) Topos de Reynosa	Free	
April 10, 2012	77	DF	(Brazil) David Lopes	LA Galaxy	Traded for Paolo Cardozo	
May 17, 2012	3	DF	(United States) Heath Pearce	New York Red Bulls	Traded for Juan Agudelo and allocation money	
May 17, 2012	11	MF	(Sierra Leone) Michael Lahoud	Philadelphia Union	Traded for Danny Califf and allocation money	
July 6, 2012	2	DF	(United States) Scott Gordon	Fort Lauderdale Strikers	Waived	
August 1, 2012	18	MF	(United States) Blair Gavin	New England Revolution	Traded for Shalrie Joseph, a SuperDraft pick and allocation money	

== Roster ==
No.	Name	Nationality	Position	Date of birth (age)	Signed from	Signed in	Contract ends	Apps.	Goals
Goalkeepers
1	Dan Kennedy	(United States)	GK	July 22, 1982 (aged 30)	(Chile) Deportes Iquique	2008			
24	Patrick McLain	(United States)	GK	August 22, 1988 (aged 24)	Cal Poly Mustangs	2012		0	0
28	Tim Melia	(United States)	GK	May 15, 1986 (aged 26)	Real Salt Lake	2012		5	0
Defenders
2	Bobby Burling	(United States)	CB	October 15, 1984 (aged 28)	Montreal Impact	2012		29	0
4	Rauwshan McKenzie	(United States)	CB	November 19, 1986 (aged 25)	Real Salt Lake	2012		25	0
5	John Alexander Valencia	(Colombia)	CB	January 4, 1982 (aged 30)	(Colombia) Atlético Junior	2012		14	0
7	James Riley	(United States)	RB	October 27, 1982 (aged 30)	Seattle Sounders FC	2012		35	0
13	Ante Jazić	(Canada)	LB	February 26, 1976 (aged 36)	LA Galaxy	2009			
23	Danny Califf	(United States)	CB	March 17, 1980 (aged 32)	Philadelphia Union	2012		23	1
Midfielders
6	Peter Vagenas	(United States)	CM / DM	February 6, 1978 (aged 34)	Vancouver Whitecaps FC	2012		16	0
8	Oswaldo Minda	(Ecuador)	DM / CM	July 26, 1983 (aged 29)	(Ecuador) Deportivo Quito	2012		23	1
10	Nick LaBrocca	(United States)	CM / AM	December 4, 1984 (aged 27)	Toronto FC	2011		64	10
12	Marco Delgado	(United States)	CM / RM / RB	May 16, 1995 (aged 17)	Chivas USA Academy	2012		1	0
16	Laurent Courtois	(France)	LM / CM	September 11, 1978 (aged 34)	(France) Grenoble	2011		31	2
17	Miler Bolaños	(Ecuador)	AM / RM / CM	June 1, 1990 (aged 22)	(Ecuador) LDU Quito (on loan)	2012		25	3
18	Shalrie Joseph	(Grenada)	CDM	May 24, 1978 (aged 34)	New England Revolution	2012		12	2
19	Jorge Villafaña	(United States)	RM / CM / RB	September 6, 1989 (aged 23)	Chivas USA Academy	2007			
21	Ben Zemanski	(United States)	RM / CM	May 12, 1988 (aged 24)	Cleveland Internationals	2010			
26	Marvin Iraheta	(El Salvador)	CM / AM	May 31, 1992 (aged 20)	New York Cosmos U-23	2012		0	0
30	Paolo Cardozo	(Uruguay)	AM / LW / RW	June 9, 1989 (aged 23)	LA Galaxy	2012		11	1
Forwards
9	Juan Pablo Ángel	(Colombia)	ST	October 24, 1975 (aged 37)	LA Galaxy	2011		31	12
11	Juan Agudelo	(United States)	ST / LW / RW	November 23, 1992 (aged 19)	New York Red Bulls	2012		23	4
14	Casey Townsend	(United States)	ST	July 7, 1989 (aged 23)	Maryland Terrapins	2012		17	1
15	Alejandro Moreno	(Venezuela)	CF / AM	July 8, 1979 (aged 33)	Philadelphia Union	2011		49	7
20	Tristan Bowen	(United States)	ST	January 30, 1991 (aged 21)	LA Galaxy	2011		7	0
22	Ryan Smith	(England)	AM / RW / LW	November 10, 1986 (aged 25)	Sporting Kansas City	2012		24	0
27	José Erick Correa	(Colombia)	ST	July 20, 1992 (aged 20)	(Colombia) Boyacá Chicó	2012		19	4
58	Cesar Romero	(United States)	ST / RW / LW	August 2, 1989 (aged 23)	(Mexico) Murciélagos	2012		14	2
Away on loan
Left Chivas USA
2	Scott Gordon	(United States)	CB	April 6, 1988 (aged 24)	Fort Lauderdale Strikers	2012		5	0
3	Heath Pearce	(United States)	CB	August 13, 1984 (aged 28)	Philadelphia Union	2011		41	0
11	Michael Lahoud	(Sierra Leone)	MF	September 15, 1986 (aged 26)	Carolina Dynamo	2009			
18	Blair Gavin	(United States)	CB	September 8, 1989 (aged 23)	Academy Bradenton	2010			

=== Management ===
Position	Staff
Head coach	Robin Fraser
Assistant coaches	Greg Vanney, Carlos Llamosa
Goalkeepers Coach	Daniel Gonzalez
Strength & Conditioning Coach	Jim Liston
Team Administrator and Assistant Coach	Kevin Esparza

Majority Owner	Jorge Vergara Madrigal
Owner Operator & President	Antonio Cué Sánchez-Navarro
Chief Financial Officer	Clem Gatmaitan
Vice President, Global Business	Francisco Suinaga
Vice President, Marketing, Sponsorship	Rodrigo Morales
General Manager	Jose Domene
Director of Soccer Operations	Kevin Esparza
Team Administrator	Anthony Garcia
Head Athletic Trainer	Brian Lee
Assistant Athletic Trainer	Derek Lawrance
Equipment Manager	José Vargas
Team Physicians	Dr. Michael Gerhardt, Dr. David Wallis
Team Chiropractor	George Billauer
Voice of the Chivas USA	Christian Miles, Allen Hopkins
Ground (capacity and dimensions)	Home Depot Center (27,000 / 109.7x68.6m)

Source: Staff,

=== Kits ===
Home	Home Alt.	Away

Type	Shirt	Shorts	Socks	First appearance / Info
Home	Red / White	Navy	Navy	
Home Alt.	Red / White	Navy	Red	Pre-season, February 22 against Club Tijuana
Away	Navy	White	White	

=== Official sponsors ===
- Corona
- Adidas
- Home Depot
- General Mills
- Volaris

== Friendlies ==
January 27, 2012	Ventura County Fusion	1–0	Chivas USA	Oxnard, California
10:00 PST, 45' x 45' Training Game	Hagop Chirishian 49'; Omar Elmasri (yellow card) 53'; Ivan Mikovic (yellow card) 61'	Match Report		Stadium: Oxnard College; Attendance: ~65; Referee: Luis Gutierrez

February 3, 2012	Chivas USA	5–0	FC Hasental	Carson, California
11:00 PST, 45' x 45' Training Game	Ryan Smith (yellow card) 10'; Michael Lahoud 22'; Juan Pablo Angel 24' (pen.); Ryan Smith 40'; Chris Cortez 50'; Cesar Romero 89'	Match Report		Stadium: HDC, Field 4 Attendance: ~80; Referee: Alex Mariscal

February 7, 2012	Chivas USA	0–1	Colorado Rapids	Carson, California
12:00 PST, 45' x 45' Training Game		Match Report	Tyrone Marshall (yellow card) 29'; Quincy Amarikwa 85'	Stadium: HDC, Field 4 Attendance: ~100; Referee: Chris Penso

February 11, 2012	Chivas USA	0–1	Chicago Fire	Bradenton, Florida USA
07:00 PST, 45' x 45' Training Game		Match Report	Daniel Paladini 24'	Stadium: IMG Soccer Academy; Attendance: ~200; Referee: Kevin Stott

February 14, 2012	Chivas USA	1–0	Montreal Impact	Carson, California
11:00 PST, 30' x 30' Training Game	Casey Townsend 2'; R.J. Allen (yellow card) 17'	Match Report	Simon Gatti (yellow card) 18'	Stadium: HDC, Field 2 Attendance: ~35; Referee: Daniel Radford

February 16, 2012	Los Angeles Galaxy	3–2	Chivas USA	Carson, California
15:00PST, Training Game	Pat Noonan 21'; Adam Cristman 31'; Dan Keat 40'; Kyle Nakazawa (yellow card) 40'	Match Report	Michael Lahoud 53'; Nick LaBrocca (yellow card) 61'; Cesar Romero 77'	Stadium: HDC, Field 1 Attendance: ~50; Referee: Chris Penso

February 22, 2012	Club Tijuana	5–2	Chivas USA	San Diego, California
20:00PST, Training Game	Bruno Piceno (yellow card) 17'; Raul Enriquez 53'; Mauro Gerk 65'; Lenardo Fernandez 79'; Noe Maya 82' (pen.); Alejandro Molina (yellow card) 87'; Lenardo Fernandez 91'	Match Report	Oswaldo Minda (yellow card) 22'; Nick LaBrocca (yellow card) 28'; Miller Bolaños (yellow card) 35'; Michael Lahoud 36'; Ryan Smith (yellow card) 43'; Ante Jazic (yellow card) 47'; Miller Bolaños (yellow card) 50' (red card); Casey Townsend 88'	Stadium: Torero Stadium; Attendance: 4,238; Referee: Alex Mariscal

February 24, 2012	Chivas USA	4–0	Loyola Marymount	Carson, California
11:00PST, Training Game	Casey Townsend 10'; Alan Souza 19'; Casey Townsend 40'; Cesar Romero 49' (pen.)	Match Report		Stadium: HDC, Field 2 Attendance: ~40; Referee: Magic Berendji

February 27, 2012	Chivas USA	0–2	AIK Fotboll	Portland, Oregon
17:00PST, Training Game		Match Report	Viktor Lundberg 41'; Lalawele Atakora 52'	Stadium: Jeld-Wen Field; Referee: Paul Ward

March 1, 2012	Portland Timbers	1–1	Chivas USA	Portland, Oregon
19:30PST, Training Game	Ryan Kawulok 78'	Match Report	Cesar Romero 21'	Stadium: JELD-WEN Field; Attendance: 15,195; Referee: Chris Penso

March 4, 2012	San Jose Earthquakes	5–0	Chivas USA	Portland, Oregon
14:30PST, Training Game	Chris Wondolowski 27'; Stephen Beitashour (yellow card) 31'; Justin Morrow 52'; Marvin Chávez (yellow card) 58'; Tressor Moreno 80'; Sercan Guvenisik 84'; Sam Garza 88'	Match Report	Heath Pearce (yellow card) 12'	Stadium: JELD-WEN Field; Attendance: NA; Referee: Yader Reyes

March 12, 2012 Match 1	Chivas USA	0–1	Los Angeles Blues	Carson, California
11:00 PDT	Alejandro Moreno (yellow card) 15'	Match Report	Chad Bond (yellow card) 13'; Mike Lopez (yellow card) 46'; Matthew Fondy 76'; Mike Lopez (yellow card) 85' (red card)	Stadium: Home Depot Center; Attendance: ~40; Referee: Daniel Radford

March 18, 2012 Match 2	Chivas USA	7–1	UC Riverside	Carson, California
13:30 PDT	Miller Bolaños 24'; Cesar Romero 37'; John Owoeri 60'; Cesar Romero 61'; John Owoeri 62'; John Owoeri 67'; Cesar Romero 85'	Match Report	Joseph O'Connor (yellow card) 13'; Otis Earle 73' (pen.)	Stadium: Home Depot Center; Attendance: ~100; Referee: Rob Sarfaraz

March 29, 2012 Match 3	Chivas USA	5–0	FC Hasental	Carson, California
11:00 PDT	Victor Manuel Chavez 50'; Blair Gavin 55' (pen.); Mario Ledesma 62'; Victor Manuel Chavez 72'; Casey Townsend 86'	Match Report		Stadium: Home Depot Center; Attendance: ~25; Referee: Jesus Cisneros

April 10, 2012 Match 4	Chivas USA	3–2	Fullerton Rangers	Carson, California
10:00 PDT	Miller Bolaños 12' (pen.); Miller Bolaños 68'; Miller Bolaños 80'	Match Report	Julio Madrigal 3'; Julio Madrigal 56'	Stadium: Home Depot Center; Attendance: ~80; Referee: Kevin Esparza

== Competitions ==
=== MLS ===
==== League table ====
Pos	Team	Pld	W	L	T	GF	GA	GD	Pts	Qualification
1	San Jose Earthquakes	34	19	6	9	72	43	+29	66	MLS Cup Conference Semifinals
2	Real Salt Lake	34	17	11	6	46	35	+11	57	MLS Cup Conference Semifinals
3	Seattle Sounders FC	34	15	8	11	51	33	+18	56	MLS Cup Conference Semifinals
4	LA Galaxy	34	16	12	6	59	47	+12	54	MLS Cup Knockout Round
5	Vancouver Whitecaps FC	34	11	13	10	35	41	−6	43	MLS Cup Knockout Round
6	FC Dallas	34	9	13	12	42	47	−5	39	
7	Colorado Rapids	34	11	19	4	44	50	−6	37	
8	Portland Timbers	34	8	16	10	34	56	−22	34	
9	Chivas USA	34	7	18	9	24	58	−34	30	

Source: MLS

Pos	Team	Pld	W	L	T	GF	GA	GD	Pts	Qualification
1	San Jose Earthquakes (S)	34	19	6	9	72	43	+29	66	CONCACAF Champions League
2	Sporting Kansas City	34	18	7	9	42	27	+15	63	CONCACAF Champions League
3	D.C. United	34	17	10	7	53	43	+10	58	
4	New York Red Bulls	34	16	9	9	57	46	+11	57	
5	Real Salt Lake	34	17	11	6	46	35	+11	57	
6	Chicago Fire	34	17	11	6	46	41	+5	57	
7	Seattle Sounders FC	34	15	8	11	51	33	+18	56	
8	LA Galaxy (C)	34	16	12	6	59	47	+12	54	CONCACAF Champions League
9	Houston Dynamo	34	14	9	11	48	41	+7	53	CONCACAF Champions League
10	Columbus Crew	34	15	12	7	44	44	0	52	
11	Vancouver Whitecaps FC	34	11	13	10	35	41	−6	43	
12	Montreal Impact	34	12	16	6	45	51	−6	42	CONCACAF Champions League
13	FC Dallas	34	9	13	12	42	47	−5	39	
14	Colorado Rapids	34	11	19	4	44	50	−6	37	
15	Philadelphia Union	34	10	18	6	37	45	−8	36	
16	New England Revolution	34	9	17	8	39	44	−5	35	
17	Portland Timbers	34	8	16	10	34	56	−22	34	
18	Chivas USA	34	7	18	9	24	58	−34	30	
19	Toronto FC	34	5	21	8	36	62	−26	23	

Source: MLS
Rules for classification: 1) points; 2) head-to-head record; 3) goal difference; 4) number of goals scored
(C) MLS Cup Champion; (S) Supporters' Shield

==== Results summary ====
Overall								Home						Away					
Pld	Pts	W	L	T	GF	GA	GD	W	L	T	GF	GA	GD	W	L	T	GF	GA	GD
28	28	7	14	7	21	44	−23	3	9	2	8	23	−15	4	5	5	13	21	−8

Last updated: September 20, 2012
Source: 2012 Major League Soccer season
Pld = Matches played; Pts = Points; W = Matches won; T = Matches tied; L = Matches lost; GF = Goals for; GA = Goals against; GD = Goal difference

==== Results by round ====
Round	1	2	3	4	5	6	7	8	9	10	11	12	13	14	15	16	17	18	19	20	21	22	23	24	25	26	27	28	29	30	31	32	33	34
Stadium	H	H	A	H	A	A	H	A	H	A	H	A	H	H	H	A	H	H	A	A	H	A	H	A	A	A	H	A	A	H	A	H	H	A
Result	L	L	W	L	W	W	L	L	L	D	W	D	D	L	W	D	D	W	L	W	L	D	L	D	L	L	L	L	L	L	L	D	L	D

Source: Regular season matches
A = Away; H = Home; W = Win; D = Draw; L = Loss

==== Results ====
March 11, 2012 1	Chivas USA	0–1	Houston Dynamo	Carson
16:00 PDT		Report	Watson (yellow card) 51'; Hainault 90+2'	Stadium: The Home Depot Center; Attendance: 14,464; Referee: Silviu Petrescu

March 17, 2012 2	Chivas USA	0–1	Vancouver Whitecaps FC	Carson
19:30 PDT	Minda (yellow card) 35'	Report	Davidson (yellow card) 63'; DeMerit 68'; Hassli (yellow card) 89'	Stadium: The Home Depot Center; Attendance: 7,723; Referee: Jair Marrufo

March 24, 2012 3	Real Salt Lake	0–1	Chivas USA	Sandy
18:00 PDT	Schuler (yellow card) 12'	Report	Minda (yellow card) 45'; Vagenas (yellow card) 55'; Townsend 72' (yellow card) 86'; Kennedy (yellow card) 93'	Stadium: Rio Tinto Stadium; Attendance: 20,415; Referee: Mark Kadlecik

April 1, 2012 4	Chivas USA	0–1	Sporting Kansas City	Carson
18:00 PDT	McKenzie (yellow card) 84'	Report	Sinovic (yellow card) 34'; Sapong 47'	Stadium: The Home Depot Center; Attendance: 13,372; Referee: Edvin Jurisevic

April 7, 2012 5	Portland Timbers	1–2	Chivas USA	Portland
19:30 PDT	Boyd 16'	Report	Minda (yellow card) 26'; Moreno 48'; LaBrocca 82'; Smith (yellow card) 90+2'	Stadium: Jeld-Wen Field; Attendance: 20,438; Referee: Chris Penso

April 14, 2012 6	Toronto FC	0–1	Chivas USA	Toronto
13:30 PDT	Lambe (yellow card) 66'; Koevermans (yellow card) 90+1'	Report	Smith (yellow card) 6'; Minda 31' (yellow card) 64'; Bolaños (yellow card) 51'	Stadium: BMO Field; Attendance: 18,476; Referee: Mark Geiger

April 21, 2012 7	Chivas USA	0–1	Philadelphia Union	Carson
19:30 PDT	Moreno (yellow card) 46'; Kennedy (yellow card) 87'	Report	Adu 40'; Valdes (yellow card) 60'; Pajoy (yellow card) 70'; Williams (yellow card) 73'; Daniel (red card) 75'; Farfan (red card) 85'	Stadium: The Home Depot Center; Attendance: 14,127; Referee: Juan Guzman

April 28, 2012 8	Colorado Rapids	4–0	Chivas USA	Commerce City
18:00 PDT	Cascio 50'; Larentowicz (yellow card) 59' (goal) 84' (pen.); Freeman (yellow card) 75'; Hill 82', 90+3'	Report		Stadium: Dick's Sporting Goods Park; Attendance: 10,969; Referee: Kevin Stott

May 4, 2012 9	Chivas USA	1–2	Chicago Fire	Carson
22:00	Minda (yellow card) 16'; Ángel 23'	Report	Pardo (yellow card) 20'; Berry 25'; Oduro (yellow card) 72'; Pappa 90+3'	Stadium: Home Depot Center; Attendance: 14,652; Referee: Baldomero Toledo

May 13, 2012 10	San Jose Earthquakes	1–1	Chivas USA	Santa Clara
19:30 PDT	Stephenson (yellow card) 39'; Corrales (yellow card) 56'; Gordon 88'; Garza (yellow card) 90+1'	Report	Correa 4'; LaBrocca (yellow card) 36'; Riley (yellow card) 74'	Stadium: Buck Shaw Stadium; Attendance: 9,169; Referee: Ricardo Salazar

May 19, 2012 11	Chivas USA	1–0	LA Galaxy	Carson
19:30 PDT	Minda (yellow card) 36'; Correa 70' (pen.)	Report	Lopes (red card) 70'; Donovan (yellow card) 85'	Stadium: The Home Depot Center; Attendance: 18,800; Referee: Mark Geiger

May 23, 2012 12	New York Red Bulls	1–1	Chivas USA	Harrison
16:00 PDT	Cooper 56'; Lindpere (yellow card) 73'	Report	Ángel 47' (yellow card) 90+3'	Stadium: Red Bull Arena; Attendance: 13,919; Referee: Armando Villarreal

May 26, 2012 13	Chivas USA	1–1	Seattle Sounders FC	Carson
19:30 PDT	Agudelo 57'	Report	Rose (yellow card) 20'; Estrada 61'	Stadium: The Home Depot Center; Attendance: 12,280; Referee: Chris Penso

June 16, 2012 14	Chivas USA	0–3	Real Salt Lake	Carson
19:30 PDT	Minda (yellow card) 73'	Report	Wingert (yellow card) 38'; Espíndola 41', 54'; Saborío (yellow card) 71'; Johnson 90+4'	Stadium: The Home Depot Center; Attendance: 13,816; Referee: Yader Reyes

June 20, 2012 15	Chivas USA	2–1	Montreal Impact	Carson
19:30 PDT	Moreno 14'; Romero (yellow card) 16'; Ángel 82'; Agudelo (yellow card) 90+1'	Report	Martins 42'; Arnaud (yellow card) 55'	Stadium: The Home Depot Center; Attendance: 10,376; Referee: Allen Chapman

June 23, 2012 16	FC Dallas	0–0	Chivas USA	Frisco
18:00 PDT		Report	Minda (yellow card) 90+2'	Stadium: Toyota Stadium; Attendance: 13,846; Referee: Fotis Bazakos

July 7, 2012 17	Chivas USA	0–0	Vancouver Whitecaps FC	Carson
19:30 PDT	LaBrocca (yellow card) 45+1'; Califf (yellow card) 90+3'	Report	Rochat (yellow card) 64'; Hassli (yellow card) 66'; Bonjour (yellow card) 71'; Koffie (yellow card) 88'	Stadium: The Home Depot Center; Attendance: 11,659; Referee: Juan Guzmán

July 18, 2012 18	Chivas USA	1–0	Portland Timbers	Carson
13:00 PDT	Bolaños 16'	Report	Kimura (yellow card) 46'; Jewsbury (yellow card) 54'	Stadium: The Home Depot Center; Attendance: 13,827; Referee: Armando Villarreal

July 21, 2012 19	LA Galaxy	3–1	Chivas USA	Carson
19:00 PDT	Keane 14'; Beckham (yellow card) 32'; Donovan 48', 78' (yellow card) 53'	Report	Smith (yellow card) 18'; Zemanski (yellow card) 36'; McKenzie (yellow card) 46'; Cardozo 52'	Stadium: The Home Depot Center; Attendance: 25,180; Referee: Jorge Gonzalez

July 28, 2012 20	Portland Timbers	0–1	Chivas USA	Portland
20:00 PDT	Songo'o (yellow card) 68'	Report	Califf 68'; Zemanski (yellow card) 73'	Stadium: JELD-WEN Field; Attendance: 20,438; Referee: Silviu Petrescu

August 12, 2012 21	Chivas USA	0–4	LA Galaxy	Carson
20:00 PDT	Valencia (yellow card) 30'	Report	Keane 27'; Juninho 64', 74'; Gonzalez 83'	Stadium: The Home Depot Center; Attendance: 17,601; Referee: Jair Marrufo

August 18, 2012 22	Colorado Rapids	1–1	Chivas USA	Commerce City
18:00 PDT	Mullen 19'	Report	Joseph (yellow card) 78'; Minda (yellow card) 80'; Ángel 83'	Stadium: Dick's Sporting Goods Park; Attendance: 15,679; Referee: Ramón Hernández

August 25, 2012 23	Chivas USA	2–6	Seattle Sounders FC	Carson
19:30 PDT	Agudelo 38' (pen.); Bolaños 64' (yellow card) 90+3'	Report	Evans 10'; Montero 27', 34', 67'; Alonso (yellow card) 54'; Ochoa 80'; Jazić 90+1' (o.g.)	Stadium: The Home Depot Center; Attendance: 11,973; Referee: Jose Rivero

August 29, 2012 24	New England Revolution	3–3	Chivas USA	Foxborough
17:00 PDT	Sène 4', 21'; McKenzie 11' (o.g.); Alston (yellow card) 44'	Report	Joseph 23', 45+1'; Bolaños 47'; Califf (yellow card) 60'	Stadium: Gillette Stadium; Attendance: 10,945; Referee: Matthew Foerster

September 2, 2012 25	San Jose Earthquakes	4–0	Chivas USA	Santa Clara
18:00 PDT	Bernárdez 11'; Baca (yellow card) 31'; Dawkins 39'; Gordon (yellow card) 48'; Wondolowski (yellow card) 70'; Corrales 71', 81'	Report	Minda (yellow card) 48'	Stadium: Buck Shaw Stadium; Attendance: 10,525; Referee: Mark Geiger

September 8, 2012 26	Seattle Sounders FC	2–1	Chivas USA	Seattle
13:00 PDT	Johnson 28', 89'	Report	LaBrocca 8'; Joseph (yellow card) 66'; Townsend (yellow card) 77'	Stadium: CenturyLink Field; Attendance: 38,934; Referee: Kevin Stott

September 15, 2012 27	Chivas USA	0–2	San Jose Earthquakes	Carson
19:30 PDT	Valencia (yellow card) 39'; Joseph (yellow card) 39'; Villafaña (yellow card) 69'	Report	Wondolowski 40' (pen.); Gordon 49'	Stadium: The Home Depot Center; Attendance: 11,317; Referee: Chris Penso

September 19, 2012 28	Columbus Crew	1–0	Chivas USA	Columbus
16:30 PDT	Meram 89' (yellow card) 90'	Report	Minda (yellow card) 75'; Valencia (yellow card) 86'; Correa (yellow card) 90'	Stadium: Columbus Crew Stadium; Attendance: 13,874; Referee: Jorge Gonzalez

September 23, 2012 29	D.C. United	1–0	Chivas USA	Washington, D.C.
16:00 PDT	Saragosa (yellow card) 60'; Bošković 64'; Najar (yellow card) 74'	Report	LaBrocca (yellow card) 68'; Townsend (yellow card) 90'	Stadium: RFK Stadium; Attendance: 11,770; Referee: Jose Carlos Rivero

September 29, 2012 30	Chivas USA	0–4	Real Salt Lake	Carson
19:30 PDT	Bolaños (yellow card) 15'; Minda (yellow card) 21'	Report	Saborío 8', 11', 65'; Wingert (yellow card) 20'; Paulo Jr. 81'	Stadium: The Home Depot Center; Attendance: 11,450

October 3, 2012 31	Vancouver Whitecaps FC	4–0	Chivas USA	Vancouver, BC
19:00 PDT	Koffie 11'; Richards 35'; Sanvezzo 62'; Robson 73'	Report	Bolaños (yellow card) 43'; Mendoza (yellow card) 55'	Stadium: BC Place; Attendance: 17,777

October 7, 2012 32	Chivas USA	1–1	FC Dallas	Carson
16:00 PDT	Bolaños (yellow card) 35'; Burling (yellow card) 43'; Villafaña 69'	Report	Pérez 8' de Guzman (yellow card) 86'	Stadium: The Home Depot Center; Attendance: 13,009

October 20, 2012 33	Chivas USA	0–2	Colorado Rapids	Carson
19:30 PDT	Zemanski (yellow card) 78'; Mendoza (yellow card) 88'	Report	Wahl (yellow card) 11'; Rivero 16'; Hill 43'	Stadium: The Home Depot Center; Attendance: 11,499; Referee: Yader Reyes

October 27, 2012 34	Chivas USA	2–2	FC Dallas	Carson
19:30 PDT	Minda (yellow card) 57'; Courtois 90'; Agudelo 90+4'	Report	Jackson (yellow card) 36' (goal) 73'; Castillo 80'	Stadium: The Home Depot Center

=== U.S. Open Cup ===
May 29, 2012 Third round	Ventura County Fusion	0–1	Chivas USA	Ventura
19:00 PDT	Daly (yellow card) 60'; Chongo (yellow card) 64'; Chavez (yellow card) 89'	Report	Romero 13'; Gordon (yellow card) 45+1'	Stadium: Ventura College; Attendance: 2,800; Referee: Jesus Cisneros

June 5, 2012 Fourth round	Carolina RailHawks	1–2	Chivas USA	Cary
16:07 PDT	Low (yellow card) 35'; Ortiz (yellow card) 48'; Lowery (yellow card) 55'; Palacio 78'	Report	Agudelo 31'; Gavin (yellow card) 37'; Riley (yellow card) 74'; Ángel 90+3' (pen.); Smith (yellow card) 90+4'	Stadium: WakeMed Soccer Park; Attendance: 7,117; Referee: Ted Unkel

June 26, 2012 Quarterfinals	Chivas USA	2–1	Charlotte Eagles	Fullerton
19:00 PDT	Correa 64' (90+4)	Report	Bloom (yellow card) 30'; Salles 89'	Stadium: Titan Stadium; Attendance: 1,230; Referee: Chris Penso

July 10, 2012 Semifinals	Seattle Sounders FC	4–1	Chivas USA	Tukwila
19:00 PDT	Johnson 31'; Alonso (yellow card) 42' (goal) 48' (pen.); Evans 83'; Ochoa 88'	Report	Minda (yellow card) 44'; Romero 74'; Califf (yellow card) 77'	Stadium: Starfire Sports Complex; Attendance: 4,500; Referee: Chris Penso

== Squad statistics ==
As of match played October 27, 2012

=== Appearances and goals ===
No.	Pos	Nat	Player	Total		Major League Soccer		U.S. Open Cup	
No.	Pos	Nat	Player	Apps	Goals	Apps	Goals	Apps	Goals
1	GK	(United States) USA	Dan Kennedy	33	0	32	0	1	0
2	DF	(United States) USA	Bobby Burling	3	0	3	0	0	0
4	DF	(United States) USA	Rauwshan McKenzie	25	0	20+1	0	4	0
5	DF	(Colombia) COL	John Alexander Valencia	14	0	13	0	1	0
6	MF	(United States) USA	Peter Vagenas	16	0	11+2	0	3	0
7	DF	(United States) USA	James Riley	35	0	32	0	3	0
8	MF	(Ecuador) ECU	Oswaldo Minda	23	1	20+2	1	1	0
9	FW	(Colombia) COL	Juan Pablo Ángel	22	5	9+10	4	2+1	1
10	MF	(United States) USA	Nick LaBrocca	29	2	26+3	2	0	0
11	FW	(United States) USA	Juan Agudelo	23	4	16+4	3	2+1	1
12	MF	(United States) USA	Marco Delgado	1	0	0+1	0	0	0
13	DF	(Canada) CAN	Ante Jazić	27	0	27	0	0	0
14	FW	(United States) USA	Casey Townsend	17	1	10+7	1	0	0
15	FW	(Venezuela) VEN	Alejandro Moreno	25	2	17+5	2	2+1	0
16	MF	(France) FRA	Laurent Courtois	20	1	9+8	1	2+1	0
17	MF	(Ecuador) ECU	Miler Bolaños	25	3	21+3	3	1	0
18	MF	(Grenada) GRN	Shalrie Joseph	12	2	12	2	0	0
19	MF	(United States) USA	Jorge Villafaña	17	1	9+5	1	3	0
20	FW	(United States) USA	Tristan Bowen	5	0	3+2	0	0	0
21	MF	(United States) USA	Ben Zemanski	25	0	18+4	0	1+2	0
22	FW	(England) ENG	Ryan Smith	24	0	12+9	0	1+2	0
23	DF	(United States) USA	Danny Califf	23	1	19	1	3+1	0
27	FW	(Colombia) COL	José Correa	19	4	7+9	2	2+1	2
28	GK	(United States) USA	Tim Melia	5	0	2	0	3	0
30	MF	(Uruguay) URU	Paolo Cardozo	11	1	8+1	1	2	0
58	FW	(United States) USA	Cesar Romero	14	2	4+8	0	1+1	2
Players away from Chivas USA on loan:
Players who left Chivas USA during the season:
2	DF	(United States) USA	Scott Gordon	5	0	0+3	0	2	0
3	DF	(United States) USA	Heath Pearce	10	0	10	0	0	0
11	MF	(Sierra Leone) SLE	Michael Lahoud	2	0	0+2	0	0	0
18	MF	(United States) USA	Blair Gavin	13	0	4+5	0	4	0

=== Goal scorers ===
Place	Position	Nation	Number	Name	MLS	U.S. Open Cup	Total
1	FW	(Colombia)	9	Juan Pablo Ángel	4	1	5
2	FW	(United States)	11	Juan Agudelo	3	1	4
2	FW	(Colombia)	27	José Correa	2	2	4
4	FW	(Ecuador)	17	Miler Bolaños	3	0	3
5	MF	(Grenada)	18	Shalrie Joseph	2	0	2
5	FW	(Venezuela)	15	Alejandro Moreno	2	0	2
5	MF	(United States)	10	Nick LaBrocca	2	0	2
5	FW	(United States)	58	César Romero	0	2	2
9	FW	(United States)	14	Casey Townsend	1	0	1
9	MF	(Ecuador)	8	Oswaldo Minda	1	0	1
9	MF	(Argentina)	30	Paolo Cardozo	1	0	1
9	DF	(United States)	23	Danny Califf	1	0	1
9	MF	(United States)	19	Jorge Villafaña	1	0	1
9	MF	(France)	16	Laurent Courtois	1	0	1
				TOTALS	24	6	30

=== Goalkeeper stats ===
No.	Nat.	Player	Total			Major League Soccer			U.S. Open Cup		
No.	Nat.	Player	MIN	GA	GAA	MIN	GA	GAA	MIN	GA	GAA
1	(United States)	Dan Kennedy	2970	58	1.75	2880	54	1.6875	90	4	4.00
28	(United States)	Tim Melia	450	6	1.2	180	4	2.00	270	2	0.50
24	(United States)	Patrick McLain	0	0	0.00	0	0	0.00	0	0	0.00
TOTALS			3420	64	1.68	3060	58	1.70	360	6	1.50

Updated to match played October 27, 2012
Source: Chivas USA

=== Disciplinary record ===
Number	Nation	Position	Name	MLS			U.S. Open Cup			Total		
Number	Nation	Position	Name	Booked	(yellow card) (yellow-red card)	Sent off (straight red)	Booked	(yellow card) (yellow-red card)	Sent off (straight red)	Booked	(yellow card) (yellow-red card)	Sent off (straight red)
1	(United States)	GK	Dan Kennedy	2	0	0	0	0	0	2	0	0
2	(United States)	DF	Scott Gordon	0	0	0	1	0	0	1	0	0
2	(United States)	DF	Bobby Burling	1	0	0	0	0	0	1	0	0
4	(United States)	DF	Rauwshan McKenzie	2	0	0	0	0	0	2	0	0
5	(Colombia)	DF	John Alexander Valencia	5	0	0	0	0	0	5	0	0
6	(United States)	MF	Peter Vagenas	1	0	0	0	0	0	1	0	0
7	(United States)	DF	James Riley	2	0	0	1	0	0	3	0	0
8	(Ecuador)	MF	Oswaldo Minda	13	0	0	1	0	0	14	0	0
9	(Colombia)	FW	Juan Pablo Ángel	1	0	0	0	0	0	1	0	0
10	(United States)	MF	Nick LaBrocca	3	0	0	0	0	0	3	0	0
11	(United States)	FW	Juan Agudelo	1	0	0	0	0	0	1	0	0
14	(United States)	FW	Casey Townsend	3	0	0	0	0	0	3	0	0
15	(Venezuela)	FW	Alejandro Moreno	1	0	0	0	0	0	1	0	0
17	(Ecuador)	MF	Miler Bolaños	5	0	0	0	0	0	5	0	0
18	(United States)	MF	Blair Gavin	0	0	0	1	0	0	1	0	0
18	(Grenada)	MF	Shalrie Joseph	3	0	0	0	0	0	3	0	0
19	(United States)	MF	Jorge Villafaña	1	0	0	0	0	0	1	0	0
21	(United States)	MF	Ben Zemanski	3	0	0	0	0	0	3	0	0
22	(England)	FW	Ryan Smith	3	0	0	1	0	0	4	0	0
23	(United States)	DF	Danny Califf	2	0	0	1	0	0	3	0	0
27	(Colombia)	FW	José Correa	1	0	0	0	0	0	1	0	0
58	(United States)	FW	César Romero	1	0	0	0	0	0	1	0	0
			TOTALS	54	0	0	6	0	0	60	0	0

== Awards ==
MLS All-Star

Player	Link
(United States) Dan Kennedy	Kennedy First ASG

MLS Player of the Week

Week	Player	Opponent	Link
6	(United States) Dan Kennedy	Toronto FC	Player of the Week

MLS Team of the Week

Week	Player	Opponent	Link
3	(United States) Dan Kennedy (United States) Rauwshan McKenzie	Real Salt Lake	Team of the Week
6	(United States) Dan Kennedy	Toronto FC	Team of the Week
10	(United States) Heath Pearce	San Jose Earthquakes	Team of the Week
11	(United States) Danny Califf	Los Angeles Galaxy	Team of the Week
12	(United States) James Riley	Seattle Sounders FC	Team of the Week

== Reserves ==
=== MLS Reserves League – Western Conference ===
==== Match results ====
Win Tie Loss

April 2, 2012 Match 1	Los Angeles Galaxy	2–4	Chivas USA	Carson, California
11:00 PDT	Noonan (yellow card) 29'; Keat (yellow card) 42'; Barrett 71'; Barrett 81'	Report	Lopes (yellow card) 29'; Bolaños 54'; Romero 59'; Romero 64'; Romero 86'	Stadium: Home Depot Center; Attendance: ~150; Referee: Jesus Cisneros

April 23, 2012 Match 2	Chivas USA	3–4	Seattle Sounders FC	Carson, California
11:00 PDT	Courtois 9'; Ángel 39' (pen.); Townsend 59'; Torres (yellow card) 90+1'	Report	Carrasco (yellow card) 10'; Cato 12'; Ochoa 31'; Cato (yellow card) 45'; Rose 62'; Levesque (yellow card) 67'; Ochoa 70'	Stadium: Home Depot Center; Attendance: ~45; Referee: Daniel Radford

May 14, 2012 Match 3	San Jose Earthquakes	1–1	Chivas USA	San Jose, California
11:00 PDT	Diaz Pizarro 2'; McLoughlin (yellow card) 44'; Alexandre (yellow card) 45+1' (yellow-red card) 86'; Cronin (yellow card) 58'	Report	Villafaña (yellow card) 37'; Marquez (yellow card) 75'; Romero 90+3'	Stadium: Nutrilite Training Facility; Attendance: NA; Referee: Vicente Cortes

June 8, 2012 Match 4	Chivas USA	3–1	San Jose Earthquakes	Carson, California
11:00 PDT	Cardozo 7'; Romero (yellow card) 30'; Bolaños 64' (pen.); Cardozo 66'	Report	Salinas 82'	Stadium: Home Depot Center; Attendance: ~80; Referee: Magic Berendji

June 18, 2012 Match 5	Chivas USA	2–2	Portland Timbers	Carson, California
11:00 PDT	Townsend 29'; Stachnik 69'	Report	Rincon 13'; Fucito (yellow card) 37'; Richards 58'	Stadium: Home Depot Center; Attendance: ~100; Referee: Daniel Radford

July 23, 2012 Match 6	Vancouver Whitecaps FC	1–3	Chivas USA	Vancouver
11:00 PDT	Frose 57'; Watson (yellow card) 75'	Report	Chavez (yellow card) 9'; Akwari (yellow card) 19'; Melia (yellow card) 37'; Courtois 41'; Gavin 66'; Romero 70'	Stadium: Thunderbird Stadium; Attendance: N/A; Referee: N/A

July 29, 2012 Match 7	Portland Timbers	4–2	Chivas USA	Portland, Oregon
14:00 PDT	Dike 27'; Dike 28'; Zizzo 37'; Chabala (yellow card) 49'; Dike 56'; Rincón (yellow card) 69'	Report	Bowen 17'; Delgado 45'; Bowen (yellow card) 49'	Stadium: JELD-WEN Field; Attendance: 6,576; Referee: Cesar Tercero

August 3, 2012 Match 8	Chivas USA	1–1	Vancouver Whitecaps FC	Carson, California
10:00 PDT	Townsend 16'; Correa (yellow card) 57'	Report	Harris 14' (pen.); Klazura (yellow card) 23'; Harris (yellow card) 32'; Alderson (yellow card) 39'; Nanchoff (yellow card) 45'	Stadium: Home Depot Center; Attendance: ~100; Referee: Alejandro Mariscal

August 7, 2012 Match 9	Chivas USA	0–1	Los Angeles Galaxy	Carson, California
11:00 PDT	Bowen (yellow card) 44'	Report	McBean 78'; Dunivant (yellow card) 84'	Stadium: Home Depot Center; Attendance: ~100; Referee: Reed Christy

September 9, 2012 Match 10	Seattle Sounders FC	4–2	Chivas USA	Tukwila, Washington
19:00 PDT	Guðjohnsen 22'; Ogăraru (yellow card) 49'; Burch (yellow card) 56'; Cato 62'; Seamon 69'; C'deBaca 90'	Report	Correa 26'; Courtois (yellow card) 35'; Steres 60' (o.g.)	Stadium: Starfire Sports Complex; Attendance: N/A; Referee: William Niccolls
