= Artigliere =

Artigliere may refer to:

== People ==
- Cameron Artigliere (b. 1990), a German football (soccer) player

== Ships ==
- Artigliere-class destroyer, a class of destroyer in commission in the Italian Navy from 1951 to 1975
- Artigliere-class frigate, a subclass of the Italian Navy's Lupo-class frigates
- Italian ship Artigliere, various Italian naval ships
