= Italian frigate Bersagliere =

Soldati-class frigate

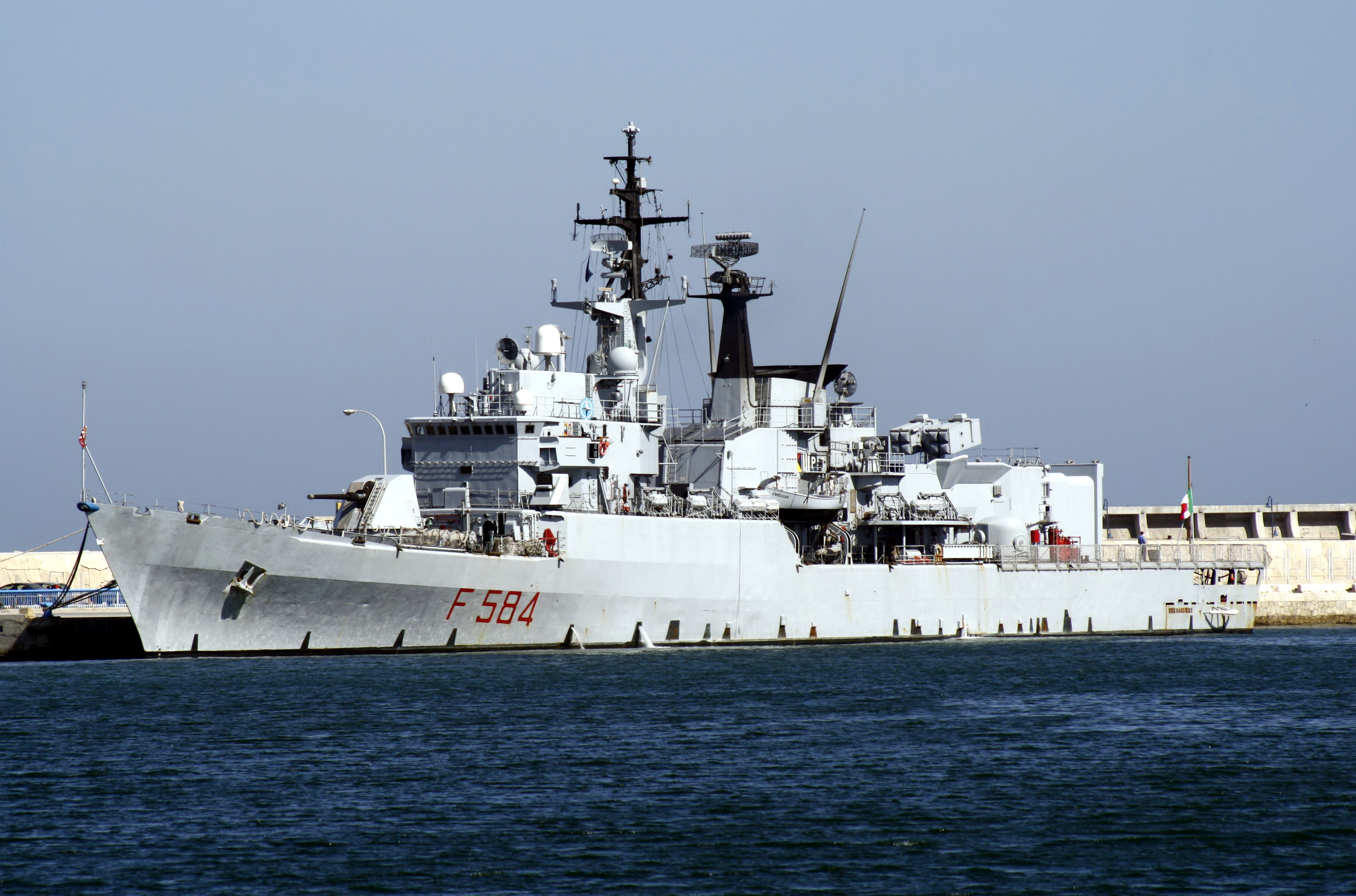
- Bersagliere on 20 May 2010

History

Italy
- Name: Bersagliere
- Namesake: Bersagliere
- Builder: Fincantieri, Riva Trigoso
- Laid down: 12 March 1984
- Launched: 18 April 1985
- Commissioned: 8 November 1995
- Decommissioned: 17 April 2018
- Renamed: from Al Yarmouk
- Home port: Taranto
- Identification: MMSI number: 247862000; Callsign: IAEO; Pennant number: F 584
- Motto: Pro Patria'; (For the fatherland)
- Fate: Scrapped in Aliaga Turkey 2024

General characteristics
- Class & type: Soldati-class frigate
- Displacement: 2.506 t (2.466 long tons) full load
- Length: 113.2 m (371 ft) LOA
- Beam: 11.3 m (37 ft)
- Draft: 3.7 m (12 ft)
- Propulsion: - CODOG scheme; - 2 x shaft; - 2 x GE / Fiat LM2500 gas turbines 50,000 shp (37,000 kW); - 2 x diesel engines Grandi Motori Trieste GMT A230-20 diesel engines 7,800 shp (5.8 MW); - 4 x diesel engine generators Grandi Motori Trieste GMT 236SS, 3,000 kW (4,000 shp)
- Speed: 35 kn (65 km/h) with gas turbines; 21 kn (39 km/h) with diesels
- Range: 4,300 nmi (8,000 km) at 16 kn (30 km/h)
- Complement: 185 (20 officers)
- Sensors & processing systems: - Selenia SADOC 2 combat management system; - 1 x Selenia SPS-774 (RAN-10S) early warning radar; - 1 x Selenia SPQ-2F CORA OTH surface search radar; - 1 x Selenia SPS-702 (or RAN-11L/X) air/surface search radar; - 1 x Selenia SPG-70 (RTN-10X) fire control radar; - 1 x Raytheon Mk 95 fire control radar; - 2 x Selenia SPG-74 (RTN-20X) fire control radar; - 1 x GEM Elettronica AN/SPN-748 navigation radar; - Raytheon DE 1160B (SQS-56) hull sonar
- Electronic warfare & decoys: - SLR-4 ESM system; - SLQ-D ECM system; - AN/SLQ-25 Nixie torpedo decoy; - 2 x Breda SCLAR decoy launchers
- Armament: - 8 x Otomat Mk 2 SSMs; - 1 x Mk.29 octuple launcher for Sea Sparrow/Aspide SAM; - 2 x Mark 32 triple torpedo tubes; - 1 x OTO Melara 127/54 mm gun; - 2 x OTO Melara Twin 40L70 DARDO compact gun
- Aircraft carried: 1 AB-212ASW helicopter
- Aviation facilities: Flight deck: 25.2 m × 11.3 m (83 ft × 37 ft); Telescopic hangar for 1 medium helicopter.

Bersagliere (F 584) was the third Soldati-class frigate of the Italian Navy.

== Development and design ==
Iraq ordered four Lupo-class frigates from CNR in 1980 as part of a naval expansion program just before the Iran–Iraq War. These ships, which feature a telescopic hangar were completed between 1985 and 1987. Due to restrictions on arm sales to Iraq because of the Iran-Iraq War placed by the Italian prime minister Bettino Craxi, the ships remained interned in Italy until the end of that war in 1988. Iraqi President Saddam Hussein then tried to renegotiate the price of these ships (and the other ships purchased from Italy), claiming he should receive a discount due to the delay in delivery of the ships. Negotiations and court proceedings were still ongoing when Iraq invaded Kuwait in 1990 and a new arms embargo against Iraq was placed by the United Nations, again blocking the sale. In 1993 all of them were seized and, after being refitted as patrol ships, incorporated to the Italian Navy as the Soldati class in 1996. Changes made for Italian service included the removal of all ASW equipment. The four ships are Artigliere (pennant F 582), Aviere (F 583), Bersagliere (F 584) and Granatiere (F 585), and are used in fleet escort or long range patrolling duties. The Philippines considered acquiring the Soldati class in 2012.

== Construction and career ==
Bersagliere was laid down on 12 April 1984 and launched on 18 April 1985 by Fincantieri at Rive Trigoso. She was commissioned on 8 November 1995. In the early 1980s, the ship had been given the name Al Yarmouk and the pennant number F-16.

Having joined the Italian Navy, the unit had an intense operational life and in addition to the normal training activity it was chosen as a naval platform for the testing of weapon systems under development, such as a new version of the 127/54 OTO cannon and the SCLAR H integrated rocket launcher system, tested during the NATO Electronic Warfare exercise (EW TRIALS) held from 23 to 25 May 2005.

Bersagliere was initially assigned to the La Spezia naval base, and then was assigned to the naval base of Taranto from 2003 to 2010, under the control of the First Frigate Squadron. Since 2010, the unit has been deployed again at the naval base of La Spezia.

Among the activities in which he took part, the most important was the circumnavigation of the globe carried out together with the Durand de la Penne. The two units, which set sail on 12 July 1996, returned to Taranto on 4 April 1997 after having travelled over 46,000 miles and touched 35 ports in 23 countries.

In 2005, from 1 January to 15 April, the ship was deployed in the Gulf of Aqaba in the Red Sea, as command ship SNMCMG2, NATO's Mine Countermeasures Force in the Mediterranean.

On 20 September 2010, under the command of the Captain Gennaro Falcone, the ship, with a crew of 188 men, left the naval base of Taranto to take part in the NATO Operation Ocean Shield to protect the merchant traffic in transit. After reaching Djibouti starting from 1 October, the ship was included in the permanent naval device of Standing NATO Maritime Group 1. The ship, which returned to the La Spezia base on 16 December, in three months of operational activity, spent in Gulf of Aden and the Indian Ocean to combat the phenomenon of piracy, carried out maritime surveillance covering 20,000 miles and interrogating 140 merchant ships in transit in the area.

On 24 July 2011, she set sail from the port of La Spezia to participate in the Italian expedition within the NATO mission to patrol the Libyan coasts as part of the military intervention in the Libyan crisis. During her operations, on August 3, 2011, at 10:40 am (Italian time) she was touched by a missile or perhaps a rocket fired from the coast. The bomb ends its run about 2 km aft of the ship by impacting into the sea. The military ship was on patrol about 10 miles from the Libyan coast, in the waters off the Zlitan area, 160 kilometers east of Tripoli, where loyalist troops are engaged in countering the rebel offensive in bitter and uncertain fighting. It is thought that the attack was entirely fortuitous and that there was no intention of hitting the Italian naval unit. On 4 August 2011, Gaddafi's official spokesman, Moussa Ibrahim, claimed responsibility for the attack, confirming that the missile was fired by army troops loyal to the Libyan dictator.

On 17 April 2018, the ceremony for the last lowering of the flag took place at the La Spezia Military Maritime Arsenal. The ceremony took place in the presence of the Chief of Staff of the Navy, Admiral Valter Girardelli, the commander-in-chief of the naval team Admiral Donato Marzano, the Northern Area Maritime Commander, Admiral Giorgio Lazio, and saw the participation of the Prefect of the Spezia, Dr. Antonio Lucio Garufi, the mayor of La Spezia, Pierluigi Peracchini, and other civil military and religious authorities. At the end of the ceremony the ship's crew recited the Sailor's prayer for the last time and the Combat Flag flag left the naval unit forever to be kept in the Shrine of flags inside the Altar of the Fatherland in Rome.

== Gallery ==
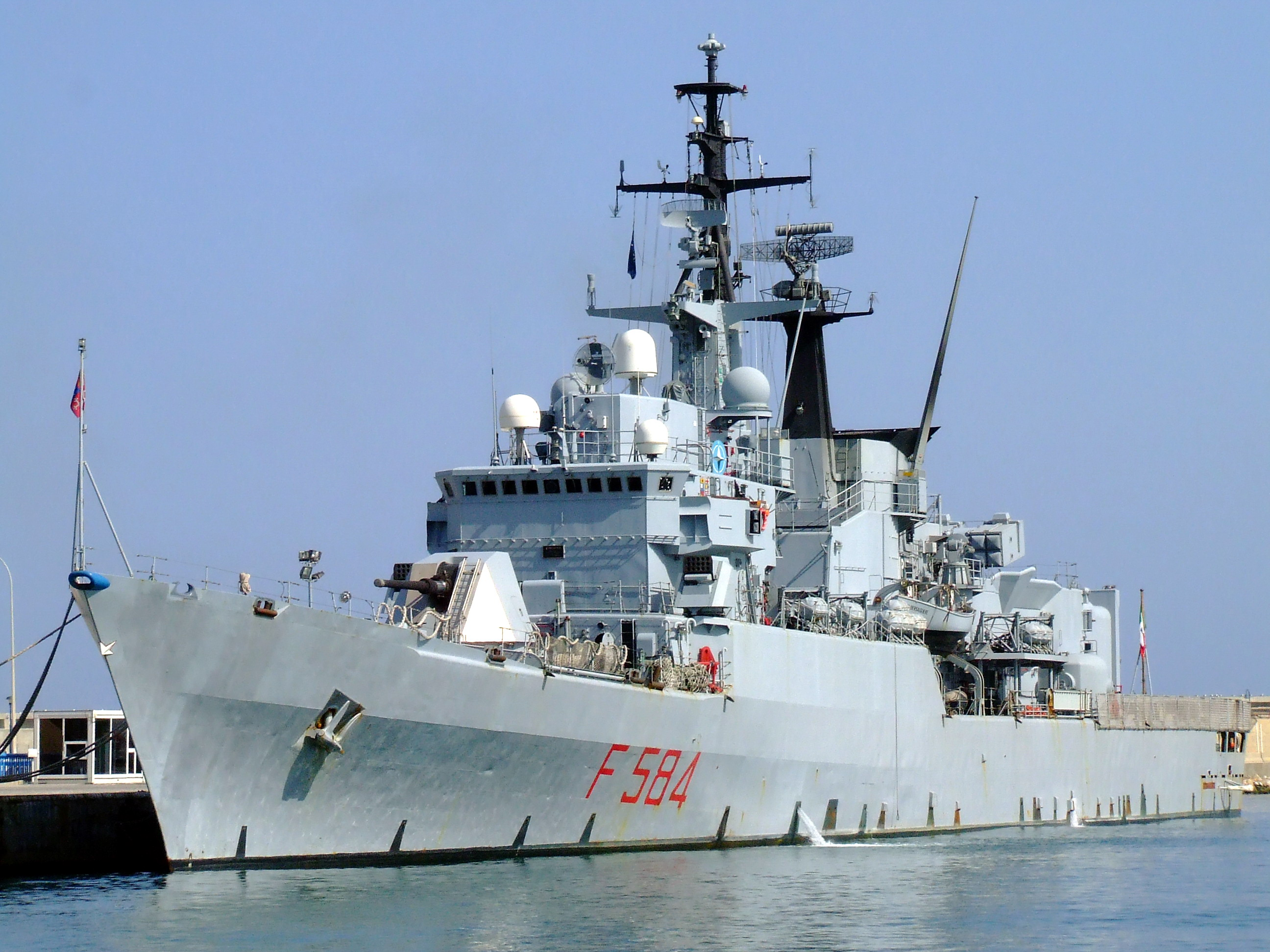
Bersagliere on 21 May 2010.

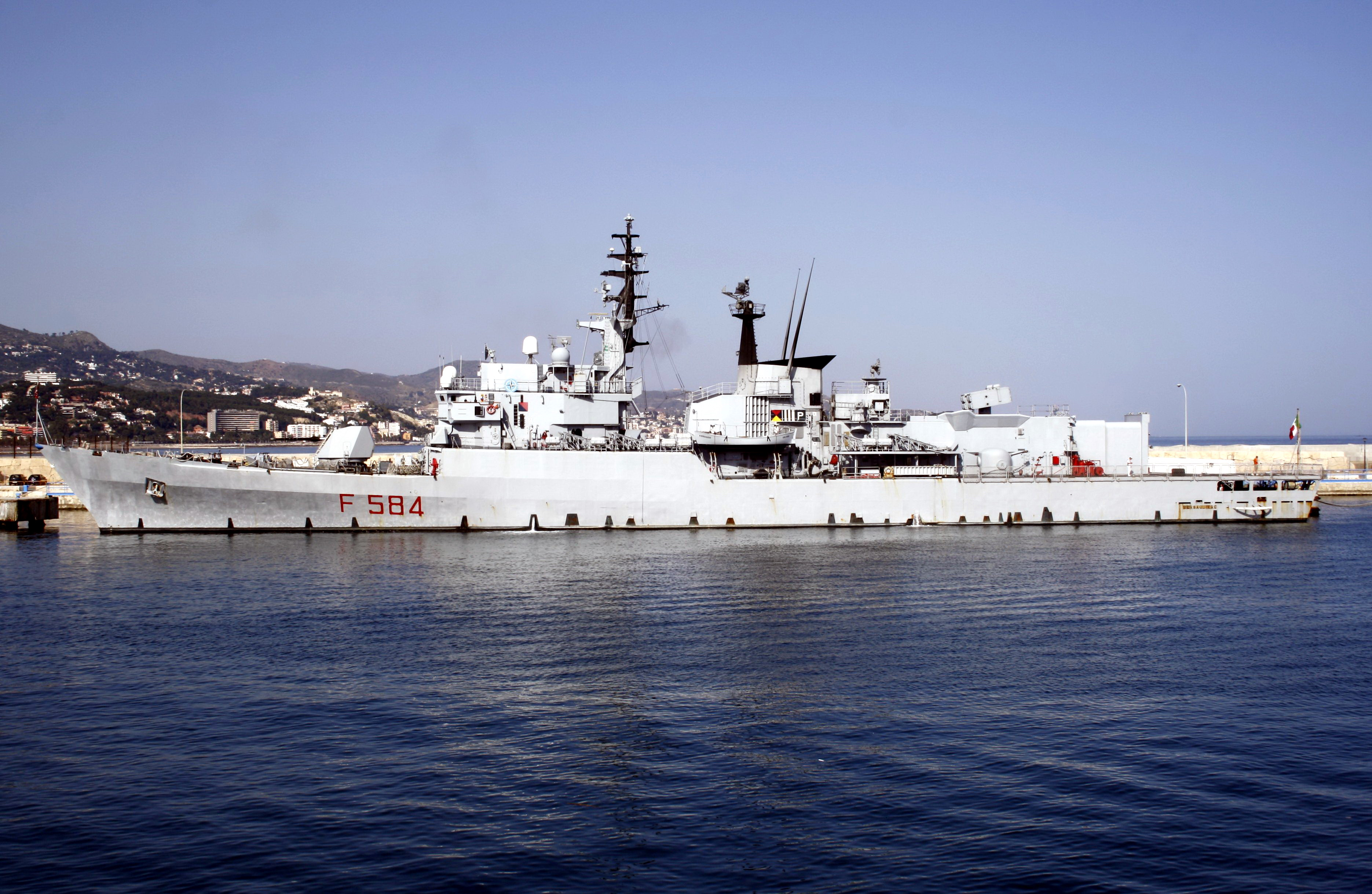
Bersagliere on 22 May 2010.

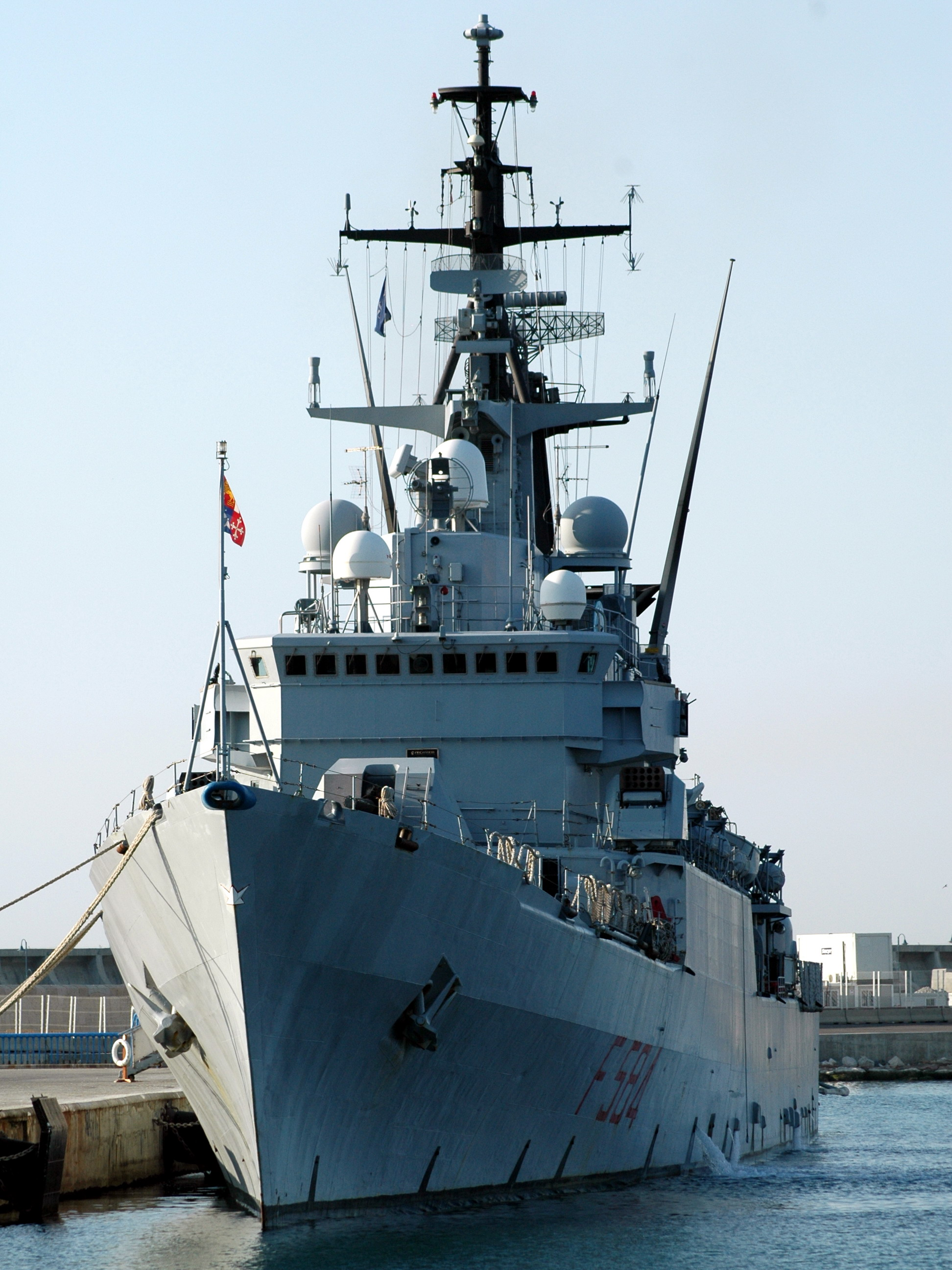
Bersagliere on 23 May 2010.
