= José Nájera =

José Nájera may refer to:

- José Nájera (wrestler) (1951-2017), Mexican wrestler better known as Fishman
- José Nájera (footballer) (born 1988), Colombian footballer
