= Camerini =

Camerini may refer to:

- Camerini, people of Cameria or Camerium, an ancient city of Latium
- Camerini d'alabastro, range of rooms built in Ferrara, northern Italy
- Camerini (surname), Italian surname

== See also ==
- Camerino
