= Italian ship Aviere =

Aviere has been borne by at least three ships of the Italian Navy and may refer to:

- Italian destroyer Aviere (1937), a Soldati-class destroyer launched in 1937 and sunk in 1942.
- Italian destroyer Aviere (D 554), a Gleaves-class destroyer launched in 1942 as USS Nicholson and transferred to Italy in 1951. She was sunk as a target in 1975.
- Italian frigate Aviere (F 583), a Soldati-class frigate launched in 1984 as Thi Quar for Iraq. Seized by Italy in 1993 and renamed Aviere.
