= Roberto Camerini =

Italian Navy officer

- Born: 23 July 1955 (age 71); Sliema, Malta
- Military career
- Allegiance: Italy
- Branch: Italian Navy
- Rank: Rear Admiral
- Commands: Commander Maritime Command North; Commander Maritime Command Sicily

Rear Admiral (L'ammiraglio di divisione) Roberto Camerini (born 23 July 1955, in Sliema) is an Italian Navy officer, currently serving as Commander Maritime Command North.

He joined the Navy in 1974 and attended the Naval Academy before joining the submarine branch. He commanded the submarine Romeo Romei from 1985 to 1986 and Giuliano Prini from 1984-1990 as well as the 2nd Submarine Group.

From 2013 to 2015 he served as Commander Maritime Command Sicily before being appointed Commander Maritime Command North (Comandante del Comando Marittimo Nord) in February 2015.

Military offices
Preceded by Andrea Toscano	Commander Maritime Command North; 2015-2016	Succeeded by Giorgio Lazio
