= Italian ship Artigliere =

Artigliere has been the name of at least five ships of the Italian Navy and may refer to:

- Italian destroyer Artigliere (1907), a Soldato-class destroyer launched in 1907 and discarded in 1923.
- Italian destroyer Artigliere (1937), a Soldati-class destroyer launched in 1937 and lost in 1940.
- Italian destroyer Artigliere (1943), a Soldati-class destroyer launched in 1937 as Camicia Nera and renamed in 1943. She was transferred to Russia in 1949 under the designation Z 12. She was stricken about 1958.
- Italian destroyer Artigliere (D 553), a Benson-class destroyer launched in 1941 as USS Woodworth She was transferred to Italy in 1951 and struck in 1971.
- Italian frigate Artigliere (F582), a Soldati-class frigate launched in 1983 as Hittin for Iraq. Seized by Italy in 1993 and renamed Artigliere.
