= José Erick Correa =

Colombian footballer (born 1992)

Personal information
- Full name: José Erick Correa Villero
- Date of birth: 20 July 1992 (age 34)
- Place of birth: Acandí, Colombia
- Height: 6 ft 1 in (1.85 m)
- Position: Forward

Team information
- Current team: Nacional Potosí
- Number: 9

Senior career*
Years	Team	Apps	(Gls)
2010–2012	Boyacá Chicó	33	(12)
2012–2014	Chivas USA	32	(3)
2013–2014	→ Gimnasia (loan)	10	(4)
2015–2016	Tigre	8	(1)
2016	Club Olimpo	7	(1)
2017	Bodø/Glimt	0	(0)
2017–2020	Deportes Tolima	18	(2)
2019	→ Alianza Petrolera (loan)	24	(3)
2020	→ Orense (loan)	18	(2)
2021–2022	Independiente Petrolero	40	(13)
2022–2023	Royal Pari	47	(16)
2023	Santa Fe	16	(0)
2024–	Nacional Potosí	8	(1)
- * Club domestic league appearances and goals as of 20 September 2024

José Erick Correa (born 20 July 1992) is a Colombian footballer who plays as a forward for Bolivian club Nacional Potosí.

== Club career ==
Correa began his career with Colombian side Boyacá Chicó in 2010. While with the club he scored 12 goals in 33 league matches. On 17 April 2012, Correa signed a deal with Chivas USA of Major League Soccer.

== Career statistics ==
All-time club performance
Club	Season	Major League Soccer		US Open Cup		MLS Cup		Total
Club	Season	App	Goals	App	Goals	App	Goals	App	Goals
Chivas USA	2012	16	2	2	2	-	-	18	4
Chivas USA	Club Total	16	2	2	2	-	-	18	4
