= Chris Cortez (soccer) =

American soccer player

Personal information
- Full name: Christopher Michael Cortez
- Date of birth: July 24, 1988 (age 38)
- Place of birth: Mission Viejo, California, United States
- Height: 6 ft 4 in (1.93 m)
- Position: Forward

Youth career
- 2007–2010: Chivas USA

College career
Years	Team	Apps	(Gls)
2006	California Golden Bears		

Senior career*
Years	Team	Apps	(Gls)
2011	Chivas USA	9	(0)
2012	Reynosa		
2013–2015	Orange County Blues	63	(20)
2016–2018	Phoenix Rising	76	(29)
2019	Chonburi	0	(0)
2019	→ Ayutthaya United (loan)	12	(2)
2019–2020	Helsingør	6	(2)
2020–2021	Příbram	3	(0)
2021	Miami FC	4	(1)
2022	Monterey Bay	14	(0)
- * Club domestic league appearances and goals as of October 21, 2022

Christopher Michael Cortez (born July 24, 1988) is an American former professional soccer player.

== Youth career ==
Cortez, who is of Mexican descent, attended the Trabuco Hills High School, where he earned South Coast League first-team all-league honors as both a junior and a senior, and led his team to the South Coast League Championship in 2005. He played club soccer for Pateadores, and played one year of college soccer at the University of California, Berkeley, before signing with Chivas USA's youth academy.

He went on to trial with Mexican side Pachuca in late 2010, before returning to the United States in early 2011 to train with Chivas USA's senior team. He participated in several of Chivas's preseason matches, and also played in the MLS Reserve Division, prior to officially turning professional.

== Club career ==
Cortez was formally signed by Chivas USA on May 15, 2011, and was immediately added to the club's game day roster. He made his professional debut the same day, coming on as a second-half substitute in a 3–2 victory over the New York Red Bulls.

Cortez was released by Chivas USA on February 26, 2012.

He then played for the Orange County Blues, scoring 20 goals in 63 games.

=== Arizona United SC ===
Cortez signed with Arizona United on March 19, 2016. Cortez finished the 2016 season with seven goals and four assists.

=== Phoenix Rising FC ===
In November 2016, Arizona United re-branded as Phoenix Rising FC. Cortez finished his second season with the Phoenix USL franchise with five goals and team leading five assists, and earned USL Team of the Week honors in Week 23 of the season.

Cortez had a record setting 2018 season, tallying 19 goals on 81 shots, and appearing in 33 games. His performance set a club record for goals in a season and career goals. On December 4, 2018, Cortez announced that he would not return to the club in favor of a chance to play in the Thailand League 1.

=== FC Helsingør ===
On August 8, 2019, Cortez joined Danish 2nd Division club FC Helsingør on a free transfer. He left the club at the end of the season.

=== Miami FC ===
Cortez returned to the now-named USL Championship on September 17, 2021, and signed for Miami FC. He left the club following the 2021 season.

=== Monterey Bay ===
On February 4, 2022, Cortez was announced as a signing for USL Championship expansion side Monterey Bay FC. Cortez was included in the starting 11 for Monterey Bay's inaugural match, a 4–2 loss to Phoenix Rising FC. His contract option was declined by the club at the end of the season.
