= Italian frigate Granatiere =

Soldati-class frigate

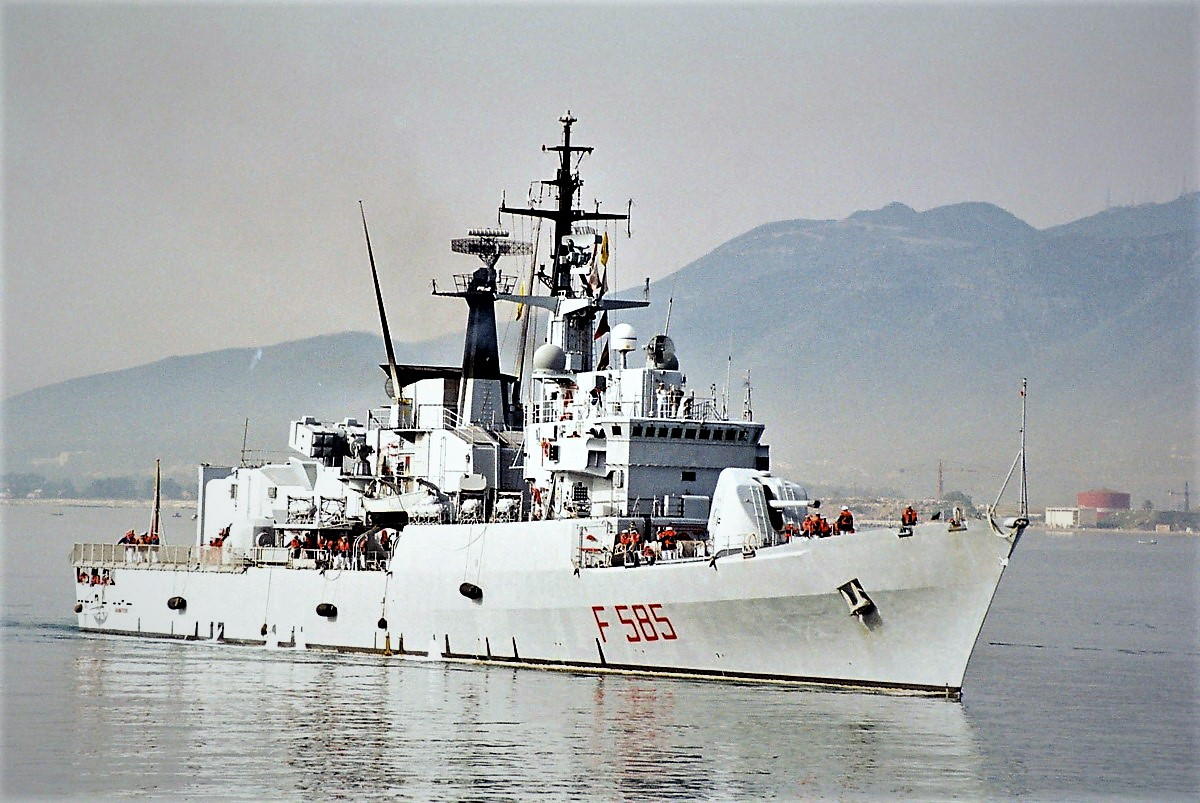
- Granatiere in October 2001

History

Italy
- Name: Granatiere
- Namesake: Granatiere
- Builder: Fincantieri, Ancona
- Laid down: 1 December 1983
- Launched: 1 June 1985
- Commissioned: 20 March 1996
- Decommissioned: 30 September 2015
- Renamed: from Al Qadisiya
- Home port: Taranto
- Identification: IMO number: 1234567; MMSI number: 12345678; Callsign: IAER; Pennant number: F 585
- Motto: A me le guardie; (Guards! Guards!)
- Fate: Scrapped in Aliaga Turkey 2021

General characteristics
- Class & type: Soldati-class frigate
- Displacement: 2.506 t (2.466 long tons) full load
- Length: 113.2 m (371 ft) LOA
- Beam: 11.3 m (37 ft)
- Draft: 3.7 m (12 ft)
- Propulsion: - CODOG scheme; - 2 x shaft; - 2 x GE / Fiat LM2500 gas turbines 50,000 shp (37,000 kW); - 2 x diesel engines Grandi Motori Trieste GMT A230-20 diesel engines 7,800 shp (5.8 MW); - 4 x diesel engine generators Grandi Motori Trieste GMT 236SS, 3,000 kW (4,000 shp)
- Speed: 35 kn (65 km/h) with gas turbines; 21 kn (39 km/h) with diesels
- Range: 4,300 nmi (8,000 km) at 16 kn (30 km/h)
- Complement: 185 (20 officers)
- Sensors & processing systems: - Selenia SADOC 2 combat management system; - 1 x Selenia SPS-774 (RAN-10S) early warning radar; - 1 x Selenia SPQ-2F CORA OTH surface search radar; - 1 x Selenia SPS-702 (or RAN-11L/X) air/surface search radar; - 1 x Selenia SPG-70 (RTN-10X) fire control radar; - 1 x Raytheon Mk 95 fire control radar; - 2 x Selenia SPG-74 (RTN-20X) fire control radar; - 1 x GEM Elettronica AN/SPN-748 navigation radar; - Raytheon DE 1160B (SQS-56) hull sonar
- Electronic warfare & decoys: - SLR-4 ESM system; - SLQ-D ECM system; - AN/SLQ-25 Nixie torpedo decoy; - 2 x Breda SCLAR decoy launchers
- Armament: - 8 x Otomat Mk 2 SSMs; - 1 x Mk.29 octuple launcher for Sea Sparrow/Aspide SAM; - 2 x Mark 32 triple torpedo tubes; - 1 x OTO Melara 127/54 mm gun; - 2 x OTO Melara Twin 40L70 DARDO compact gun
- Aircraft carried: 1 AB-212ASW helicopter
- Aviation facilities: Flight deck: 25.2 m × 11.3 m (83 ft × 37 ft); Telescopic hangar for 1 medium helicopter.

Granatiere (F 585) was the fourth ship of the Soldati-class frigate of the Italian Navy.

== Development and design ==
Iraq ordered four Lupo-class frigates from CNR in 1980 as part of a naval expansion program just before the Iran–Iraq War. These ships, which feature a telescopic hangar were completed between 1985 and 1987. Due to restrictions on arm sales to Iraq because of the Iran-Iraq War placed by the Italian prime minister Bettino Craxi, the ships remained interned in Italy until the end of that war in 1988. Iraqi President Saddam Hussein then tried to renegotiate the price of these ships (and the other ships purchased from Italy), claiming he should receive a discount due to the delay in delivery of the ships. Negotiations and court proceedings were still ongoing when Iraq invaded Kuwait in 1990 and a new arms embargo against Iraq was placed by the United Nations, again blocking the sale. In 1993 all of them were seized and, after being refitted as patrol ships, incorporated to the Italian Navy as the Soldati class in 1996. Changes made for Italian service included the removal of all ASW equipment. The four ships are Artigliere, Aviere, Bersagliere and Granatiere, and are used in fleet escort or long range patrolling duties. The Philippines considered acquiring the Soldati class in 2012.

== Construction and career ==
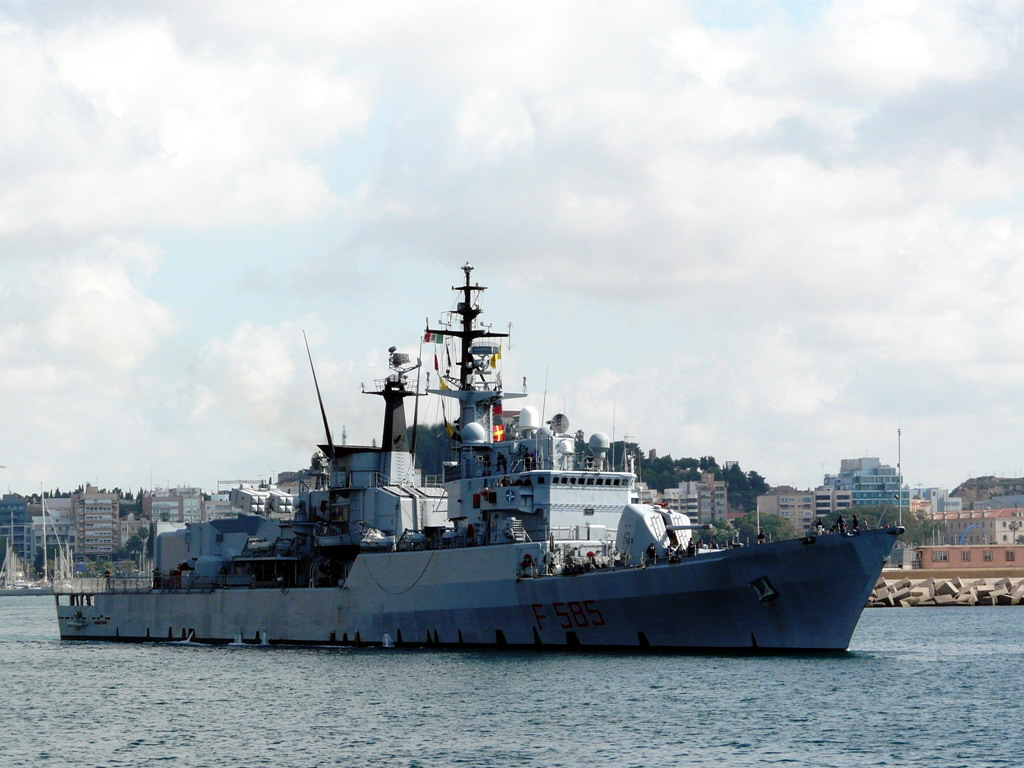
Granatiere on 21 June 2010

Granatiere was laid down on 1 December 1983 and launched on 1 June 1985 by Fincantieri at Ancona. She was commissioned on 20 March 1996. In the early 1980s, the ship had been given the name Al Qadisiya and the pennant number F-17.

The ship received the Combat Flag in a joint ceremony with the sister ships Artigliere, Aviere and Bersagliere on 5 July 1996. General Roberto Di Nardo, National President of the Granatieri di Sardegna Association, which, together with the banner, delivered to the Commander of the ship, on behalf of the Association, an artistic inlaid wooden chest for the conservation of the Flag.

Employed since its entry into service mainly in anti-immigration patrolling activities, during the same activity, in July 2001, sailing in the Lower Ionian Sea, it distinguished itself in the recovery of about 650 refugees, which it collected in the high seas and subsequently landed in Crotone. The ship changed its operational base, being redeployed to Taranto, after the first units of the Lupo class, deployed at Apulia, were progressively decommissioned due to age limits.

In 2002, after a brief paused to drydock, she carried out two important international activities, first the STANAVFORLANT, which lasted from 11 April to 7 July, followed by STANAVFORMED, from 9 September to 4 November. In these two activities, the ship visited the ports of Suda in Crete, Aksaz, Turkey, Split in Croatia, Tunis in Tunisia.

In 2003, it was one of the first Italian ships to touch the port of Tripoli, as part of the relaxation of relations between Libya and Italy.

In the two-year period 2004–2005 remained at Taranto, for planned works.

However, 2005 was the year that saw it be present in two oceans of the globe. From May of the same year until July, she visited the ports of Lisbon, Cádiz and Rota and then, after a brief stop in Taranto, she was unexpectedly called to the Indian Ocean and precisely to the Horn of Africa for the defense of the merchant traffic from piracy. The ship, with a short notice of only fifteen days, was able to be able to move for a long activity and among other things, in the course of the operations of contrast and escort to the domestic merchant ships flying in the area, such as the Jolly Marrone, in the Gulf of Aden, gave relief to Somali shipwrecks who had been recovered by a Danish merchant ship. Among the shipwrecked women children, including one born at sea the previous day. After giving assistance with the medical personnel on board, the Grenadier patrol boat escorted the merchant ship to the port of Djibouti where the shipwrecked were disembarked. As in 2001, with the illegal immigrants recovered off the coast of Crotone, the ship returned to the headlines in Italy, where the news bounced around in the main newspapers. During this long activity, the ship stopped over at the ports of Djibouti and Salalah, Oman, returning to Taranto on 25 November 2005.

Ships of the Soldati class are considered by the Navy to have reached operational limits. The decommissioning plan provides for its decommissioning in the sequence Artigliere, Granatiere, Aviere, and Bersagliere. Granatiere's planned withdrawal from service in 2014 was then postponed to 2015.
