= Camerini (surname) =

Camerini is an Italian surname. Notable people with the surname include:

- Alberto Camerini, Italian singer-songwriter and musician
- Mario Camerini, Italian film director and screenwriter
- Michael Camerini, British-born American film director, producer and cinematographer
- Francis Camerini, French footballer
- Roberto Camerini (born 1955), an Italian Navy officer
