= Italian frigate Artigliere =

Soldati-class frigate

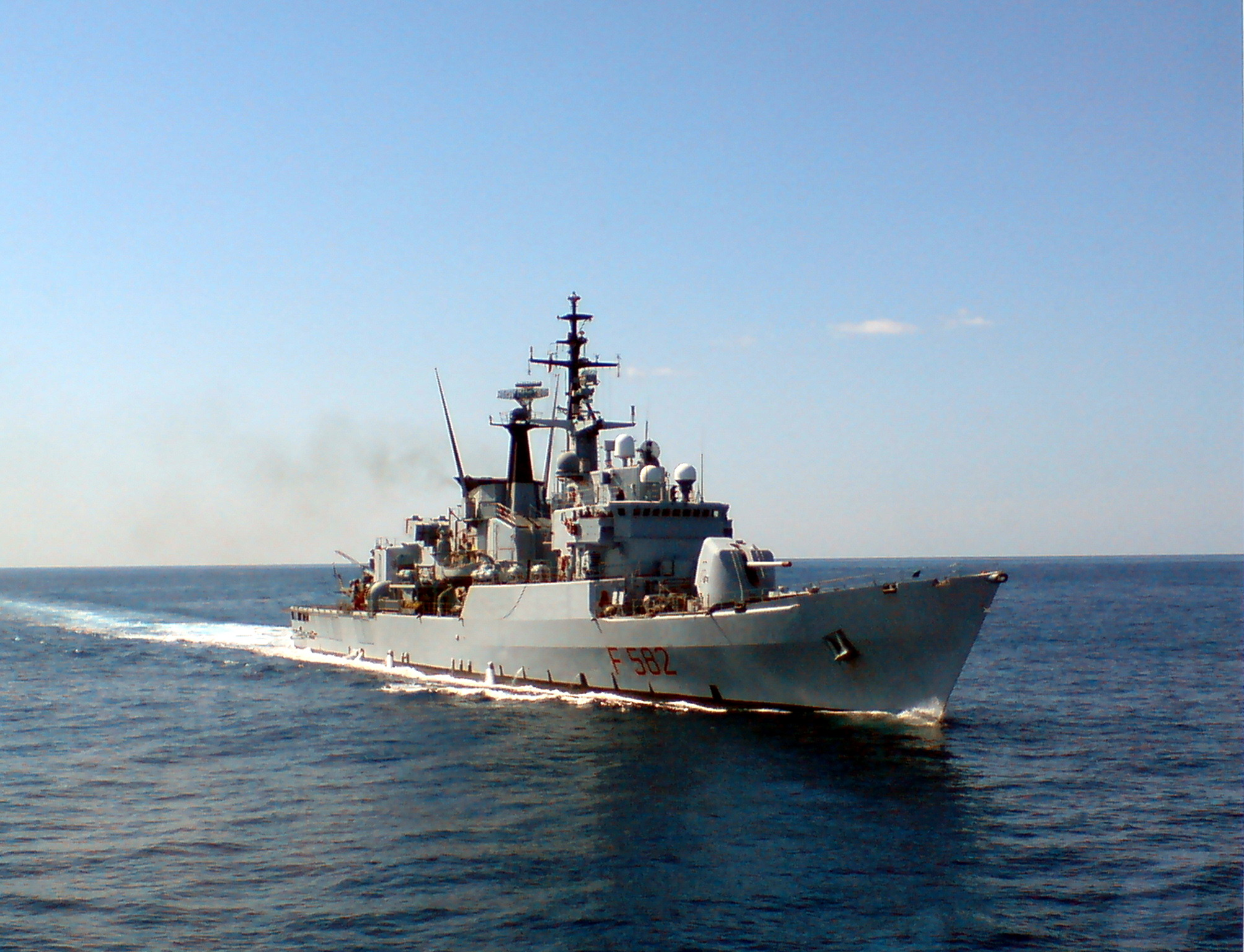

History

Italy
- Name: Artigliere
- Namesake: Artigliere
- Builder: C.N.R, Ancona
- Laid down: 31 March 1982
- Launched: 27 July 1983
- Commissioned: 28 October 1994
- Decommissioned: 13 December 2013
- Renamed: from Hittin
- Home port: Taranto
- Identification: Callsign: IAEP; Pennant number: F 582
- Motto: Primi Velitum; (First to the fight)
- Fate: Scrapped in Aliaga Turkey 2024

General characteristics
- Class & type: Soldati-class frigate
- Displacement: 2.506 t (2.466 long tons) full load
- Length: 113.2 m (371 ft) LOA
- Beam: 11.3 m (37 ft)
- Draft: 3.7 m (12 ft)
- Propulsion: - CODOG scheme; - 2 x shaft; - 2 x GE / Fiat LM2500 gas turbines 50,000 shp (37,000 kW); - 2 x diesel engines Grandi Motori Trieste GMT A230-20 diesel engines 7,800 shp (5.8 MW); - 4 x diesel engine generators Grandi Motori Trieste GMT 236SS, 3,000 kW (4,000 shp)
- Speed: 35 kn (65 km/h) with gas turbines; 21 kn (39 km/h) with diesels
- Range: 4,300 nmi (8,000 km) at 16 kn (30 km/h)
- Complement: 185 (20 officers)
- Sensors & processing systems: - Selenia SADOC 2 combat management system; - 1 x Selenia SPS-774 (RAN-10S) early warning radar; - 1 x Selenia SPQ-2F CORA OTH surface search radar; - 1 x Selenia SPS-702 (or RAN-11L/X) air/surface search radar; - 1 x Selenia SPG-70 (RTN-10X) fire control radar; - 1 x Raytheon Mk 95 fire control radar; - 2 x Selenia SPG-74 (RTN-20X) fire control radar; - 1 x GEM Elettronica AN/SPN-748 navigation radar; - Raytheon DE 1160B (SQS-56) hull sonar
- Electronic warfare & decoys: - SLR-4 ESM system; - SLQ-D ECM system; - AN/SLQ-25 Nixie torpedo decoy; - 2 x Breda SCLAR decoy launchers
- Armament: - 8 x Otomat Mk 2 SSMs; - 1 x Mk.29 octuple launcher for Sea Sparrow/Aspide SAM; - 2 x Mark 32 triple torpedo tubes; - 1 x OTO Melara 127/54 mm gun; - 2 x OTO Melara Twin 40L70 DARDO compact gun
- Aircraft carried: 1 AB-212ASW helicopter
- Aviation facilities: Flight deck: 25.2 m × 11.3 m (83 ft × 37 ft); Telescopic hangar for 1 medium helicopter.

Artigliere (F-582) was the lead ship of the Soldati-class frigate of the Italian Navy.

== Development and design ==
Iraq ordered four Lupo-class frigates from CNR in 1980 as part of a naval expansion program just before the Iran–Iraq War. These ships, which feature a telescopic hangar were completed between 1985 and 1987. Due to restrictions on arm sales to Iraq because of the Iran-Iraq War placed by the Italian prime minister Bettino Craxi, the ships remained interned in Italy until the end of that war in 1988. Iraqi President Saddam Hussein then tried to renegotiate the price of these ships (and the other ships purchased from Italy), claiming he should receive a discount due to the delay in delivery of the ships. Negotiations and court proceedings were still ongoing when Iraq invaded Kuwait in 1990 and a new arms embargo against Iraq was placed by the United Nations, again blocking the sale. In 1993 all of them were seized and, after being refitted as patrol ships, incorporated to the Italian Navy as the Soldati class in 1996. Changes made for Italian service included the removal of all ASW equipment. The four ships are Artigliere (pennant F 582), Aviere (F 583), Bersagliere (F 584) and Granatiere (F 585), and are used in fleet escort or long range patrolling duties. The Philippines considered acquiring the Soldati class in 2012.

== Construction and career ==
Artigliere was on laid down 31 March 1982 and launched on 27 July 1983 by Fincantieri at Ancona. She was commissioned on 28 October 1994. In the early 1980s, the ship had been given the name Hittin and the pennant number F-14.

Having joined the Italian Navy, she has had an intense operational life with the participation in various operations carried out jointly with units of allied navies. The ship took part in the patrol of the Adriatic between 1995 and 2000 interspersed with a Naval Campaign in South East Asia between September 1997 and January 1998.

She then took part in Operation Active Endeavor, on several occasions, between 2002 and 2005, as part of STANAVFORMED (Naval Stationing Force in the Mediterranean) in the Eastern Mediterranean in 2002 and as part of STANAVFORLANT (Naval Stationing Force in the Atlantic) also in the Eastern Mediterranean in 2002, 2003 and 2005.

Also in May 2005, she was the command Ship of the MCMFORSOUTH, the Mine Countermeasures Force and between September and October she carried out naval training at the Naval Training Center of the Italian Navy.

In 2006, she took part in the bilateral Italian-Maltese exercise CANALE 06 in the waters of the Strait of Sicily.

On 31 January 2012 the unit was placed in RTD (Reduced Availability Table).

On 13 December 2013, at the Sottoflutto pier of the port of Castellammare di Stabia, the lowering of her flag took place. [1] The ceremony was attended by civil and military authorities, including the mayor of Castellammare di Stabia, the vice-president of the retired artillerymen association, General Genta and the Chief of Staff of the Navy Admiral De Giorgi to whom the last commander of the unit, frigate captain Paolo Casulli handed over the combat flag.

In 2015, she was mothballed in the Arsenale of La Spezia with Ardito and Audace.

ITS Artigliere (F582) and ITS Bersagliere (F584) was seen leaving La Spezia, Italy aboard the MS Seaway Albatross on 11 March 2024, on the way to Turkey for scrapping.

== Gallery ==
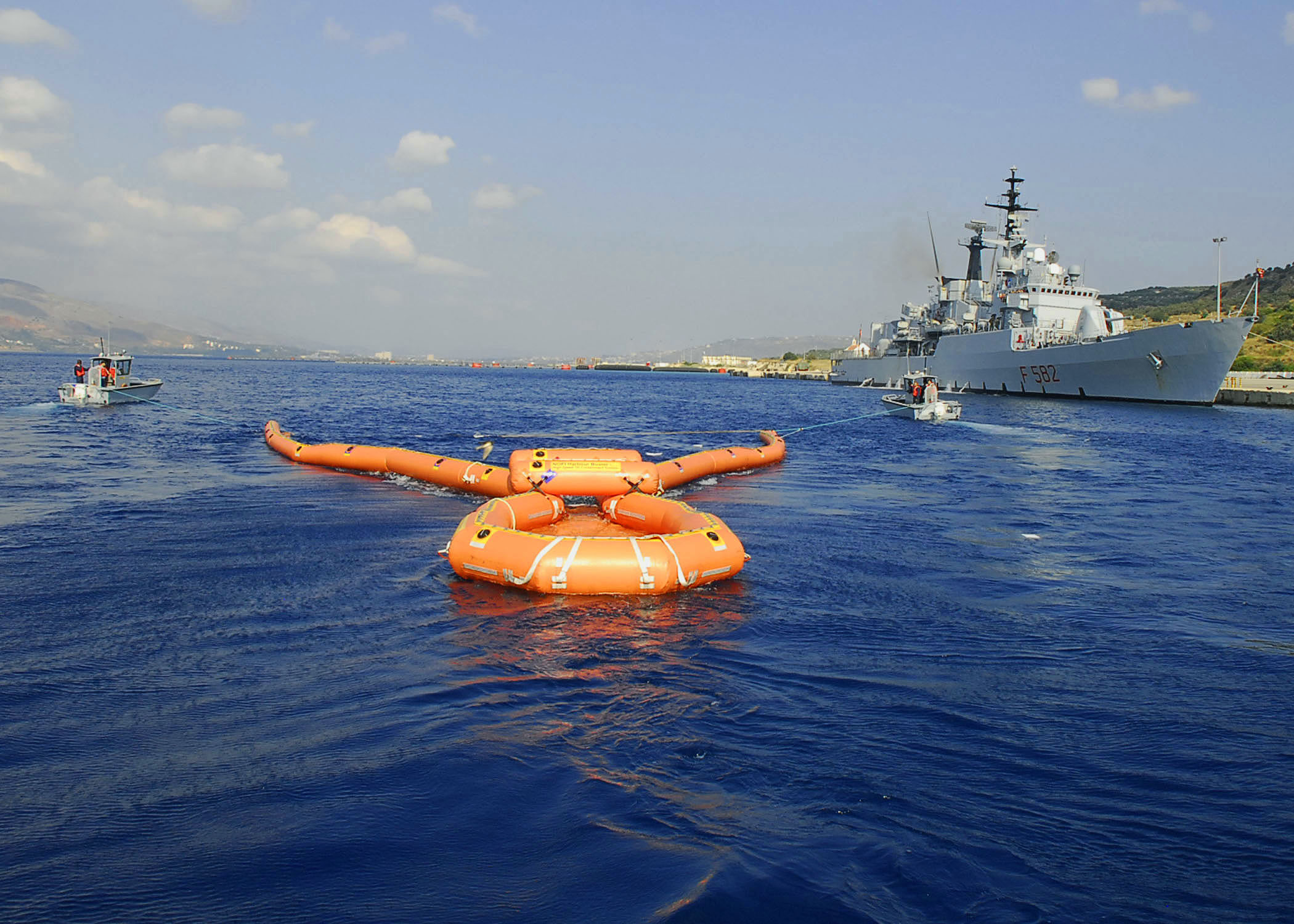
Artigiere off Crete on 13 July 2007.

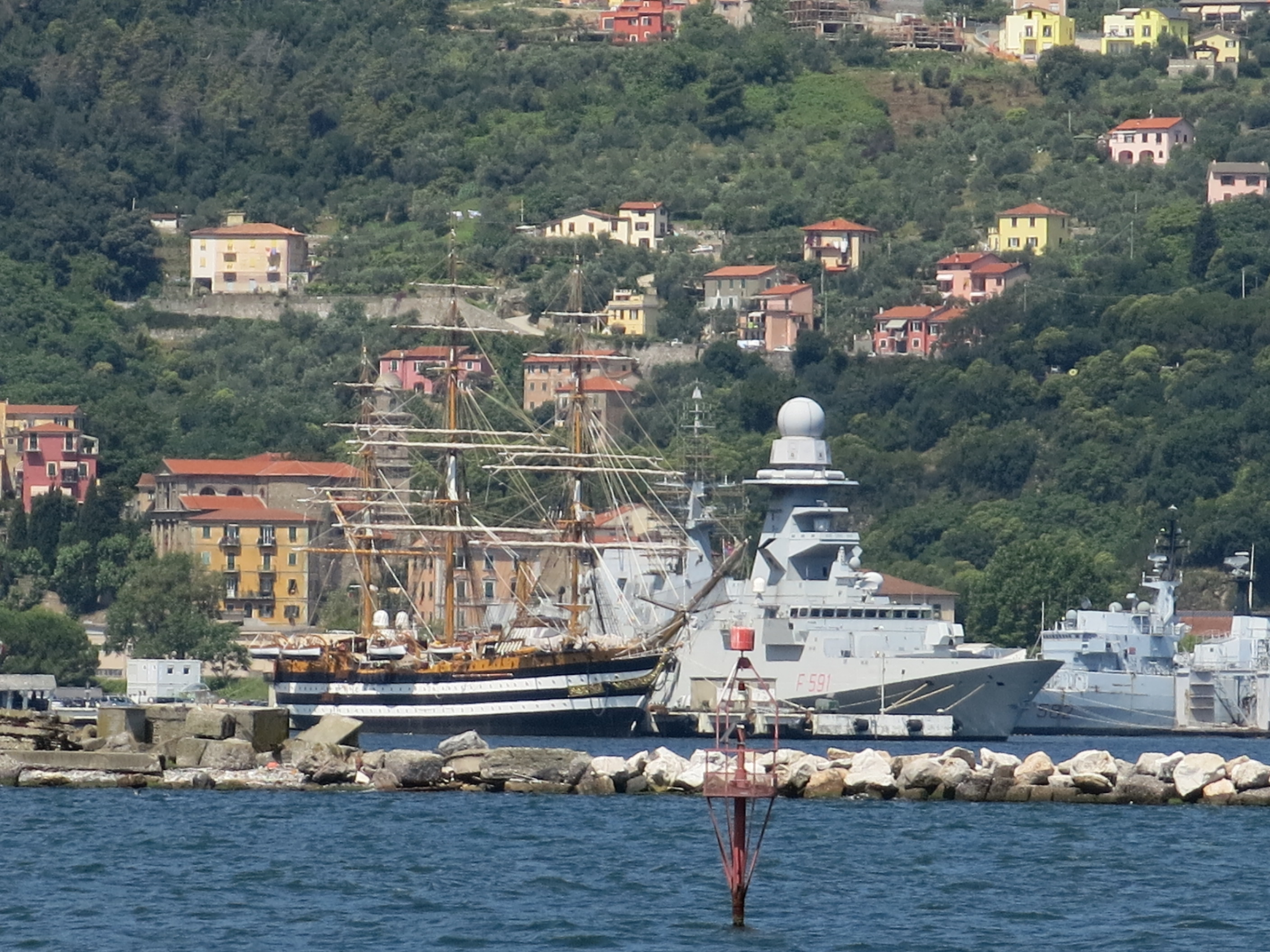
Artigliere and Virginio Fasan at La Spezia on 20 June 2016.
