= Cameron Artigliere =

German soccer player

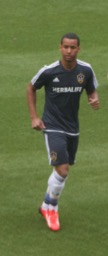
- Artigliere with LA Galaxy II

Personal information
- Date of birth: 3 July 1990 (age 36)
- Place of birth: Bamberg, Germany
- Height: 6 ft 1 in (1.85 m)
- Position: Forward

Youth career
- 1995–1997: FC Eintracht Bamberg
- 2004–2008: Fusion FC

Senior career*
Years	Team	Apps	(Gls)
2008–2009	SG Kaarst	7	(2)
2008–2009	→ Fortuna Düsseldorf	0	(0)
2009–2010	Rheydter SV	18	(2)
2012–2013	Chivas USA	0	(0)
2014–2016	FC Hasental	19	(13)
2015–2016	→ LA Galaxy II	1	(1)
- * Club domestic league appearances and goals

Cameron Artigliere (born July 3, 1990) is a German soccer player.

== Biography ==
=== Early life ===
Born in Bamberg, Germany, Artigliere is a Southern California native. San Fernando Valley-bred midfielder Cameron Artigliere (Winnetka/El Camino Real HS) played in Dallas Cup, the top youth international football tournament for invited youth teams. In late 2008, he spent time playing in the lower leagues of Germany for SG Kaarst.

=== Career ===
Artigliere, who most recently played with German side Rheydter SV Rheydter Spielverein. in 2008, he was invited to trial by 2. Bundesliga side Fortuna Düsseldorf. Artigliere recently returned to the U.S. after playing with Rheydter SV, based in Mönchengladbach, Germany. Artigliere made a move to Major League Soccer side Chivas USA in 2012. Making his debut for Chivas USA, Cameron Artigliere, came on for Ben Zemanski in the 69th minute in a 7–1 win over UC Riverside. After being released from the club 2012 Chivas USA, Artigliere signed with LA Galaxy feeder club FC Hasental. Artigliere was called on trial to train and play friendly games with the LA Galaxy reserve team. During his last game for FC Hasental, Cameron Artigliere would strike yet again. Artigliere fired a rocket on a free kick from 30 yards out to give FC Hasental a 2–0 lead over the Albion SC Pros in the 39th minute.
