= Casey Townsend =

American soccer player (born 1989)

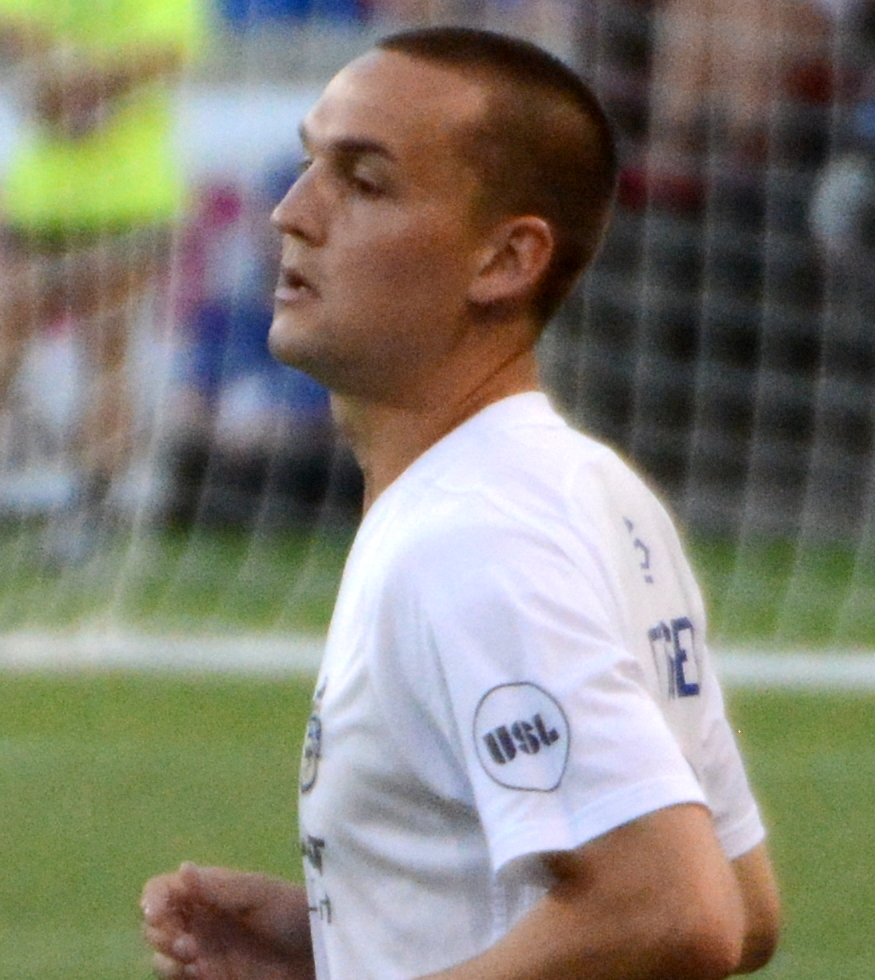
- Townsend with Charlotte Independence in 2017

Personal information
- Full name: Casey James Townsend
- Date of birth: July 7, 1989 (age 37)
- Place of birth: Traverse City, Michigan, United States
- Height: 5 ft 11 in (1.80 m)
- Positions: Forward; midfielder

Youth career
- 2004–2007: Vardar SC

College career
| Years | Team | Apps | (Gls) |
| 2008–2011 | Maryland Terrapins | 85 | (43) |

Senior career*
| Years | Team | Apps | (Gls) |
| 2012 | Chivas USA | 17 | (1) |
| 2013 | D.C. United | 9 | (0) |
| 2013 | → Richmond Kickers (loan) | 4 | (2) |
| 2014 | Tampa Bay Rowdies | 16 | (3) |
| 2015–2016 | Oklahoma City Energy | 29 | (1) |
| 2016 | Wilmington Hammerheads | 11 | (2) |
| 2016–2017 | FC Cincinnati | 4 | (1) |
| 2017 | → Charlotte Independence (loan) | 11 | (0) |

International career
| 2006 | United States U18 | 4 | (0) |
| 2008 | United States U20 | 3 | (1) |
- * Club domestic league appearances and goals

Casey James Townsend (born July 7, 1989) is an American former professional soccer player who played as a forward or midfielder.

== Career ==
=== Prep career ===
Townsend played for Traverse City West High School in Michigan from 2004 to 2007. During his time there he was named the state's Player of The Year (Mr. Soccer) in 2006 and 2007. He is the only player who has ever been given that award twice. He was also named a two-time NSCAA All-American (2006 & 2007), and three-time PARADE All-American (2005 to 2007), while scoring a school record 105 goals and adding 47 assists in his four years there. In addition to these honors, he led the school to their first and only Division 1 State Championship in 2006.

=== College and amateur ===
Townsend played college soccer at the University of Maryland between 2008 and 2011. He was the starting forward on their 2008 National Championship team. During his time at Maryland, Townsend was named as a 2011 M.A.C. Hermann Trophy Semifinalist (college player of the year), a 2011 NSCAA First Team All-American, and as an All-Atlantic Coast Conference (ACC) First Team selection in both 2010 and 2011. In addition to those accolades, he was named to the 2008 ACC All-Freshman First Team and 2010 ACC All-Academic Team, while also leading Maryland to a pair of ACC Men's Tournament Championships in 2008 and 2010 respectively. He was subsequently named to the All-Tournament Team each time. Townsend finished his Maryland career ranked 4th All-Time in goals scored and 6th All-Time in overall points in the school's illustrious history.

=== Professional ===
Townsend was named MVP of the 2012 Major League Soccer (MLS) Player Combine after a strong showing at the pre-draft showcase event.

Chivas USA subsequently selected Townsend in the first round (No. 5 overall) of the 2012 MLS SuperDraft.

Townsend made his debut as a 77th-minute substitute during a 1–0 loss against Houston Dynamo on March 11, 2012. On March 24, 2012, Townsend scored his first MLS goal during a 1–0 away win at Real Salt Lake.

On January 25, 2013, Townsend was traded to D.C. United in exchange for a second-round pick in the 2014 MLS SuperDraft.

On March 19, 2013, Townsend was loaned to United's USL affiliate Richmond Kickers for the 2013 season. Townsend scored his first goals for Richmond on April 13, 2013, en route to a 4–1 victory over Charleston Battery. His immediate success in Richmond, along with United's scoring woes to begin the 2013 campaign resulted in Townsend being recalled for the April 21 fixture against Philadelphia.

Townsend would make his debut with D.C. United on May 11, 2013, when the club played at FC Dallas. Townsend's first shot of the game came in the ninth minute, which hit off the post. He would go on to claim the 2013 U.S. Open Cup title with the team later that year as they beat Real Salt Lake in the final of that tournament.

Townsend played for the Tampa Bay Rowdies of the NASL in 2014. He signed with the Oklahoma City Energy FC of the USL for the 2015 season where he led the team in assists with 6 playing primarily as a midfielder, while also helping lead the team to the 2015 USL Western Conference final.

Townsend moved to United Soccer League's Wilmington Hammerheads on May 9, 2016. He later moved to FC Cincinnati for the remainder of 2016 as well as the 2017 USL season. He scored in his second game there against Orlando City on September 17, 2016, to help FC Cincinnati secure a home playoff game in their inaugural year.

On March 29, 2017, Townsend moved on a season long loan to USL side Charlotte Independence. He scored his first goal for the team on May 17, 2017, against the PDL side Charlotte Eagles in the Lamar Hunt U.S. Open Cup.

=== Honors ===
- High School - Traverse City West:
  - 2006: Michigan Division 1 High School State Championship
  - 2006 and 2007: Michigan Mr. Soccer (state player of the year)
  - 2005, 2006, 2007: PARADE High School All-American
  - 2006 and 2007: NSCAA High School All-American
  - 2005, 2006, 2007: First Team All-State selection
- College - University of Maryland:
  - 2008: NCAA Men's Division 1 National Championship
  - 2008 and 2010: ACC Men's Tournament Champion
  - 2008 and 2010: ACC Men's All-Tournament Team
  - 2010: ACC Men's All-Academic Team
  - 2011: NSCAA First Team All-American
  - 2011: MAC Hermann Trophy Semifinalist (college player of the year)
  - 2010 and 2011: All-ACC First Team Selection
  - 2008: All-ACC Freshman First Team Selection
- Professional (MLS):
  - 2012: Major League Soccer Player Combine MVP
  - 2012: #5 Overall pick in the first round of the Major League Soccer (MLS) Superdraft to Chivas USA
- D.C. United (MLS):
  - 2013: Lamar Hunt U.S. Open Cup Champion
- OKC Energy FC (USL):
  - 2015: USL Western Conference final
