= Sebastian Stachnik =

German footballer

Personal information
- Full name: Sebastian Stachnik
- Date of birth: 14 June 1986 (age 40)
- Place of birth: Berlin, Germany
- Height: 1.85 m (6 ft 1 in)
- Positions: Midfielder; striker

Youth career
- BSC Rehberge 1945
- –2003: Hertha Zehlendorf
- 2003–2005: Hertha BSC

Senior career*
Years	Team	Apps	(Gls)
2005–2006	Hertha BSC II	10	(0)
2006–2007	Hannover 96 II	31	(13)
2007–2009	1. FC Kaiserslautern II	48	(26)
2007–2009	1. FC Kaiserslautern	8	(0)
2009–2010	Rot-Weiss Essen	29	(7)
2010–2011	Sportfreunde Lotte	30	(5)
2011–2013	Helmond Sport	45	(11)
2013–2015	Viktoria Berlin	18	(4)
Total		219	(66)
- * Club domestic league appearances and goals

Sebastian Stachnik (born 14 June 1986) is a German retired footballer.

== Career ==
Stachnik, who was born in the German capital Berlin, joined the second team of Hannover 96 in the year 2006 after playing for several other youth teams in Berlin. In his first fourth league, season he scored 13 times but did not get an opportunity to prove his talent in the Bundesliga with Hannover 96. He then followed the director of the Bundesliga team Michael Schjønberg to 1. FC Kaiserslautern in the second league. He made his debut on 13 August 2007 with Kaiserslautern when he was substituted in a 1–1 draw against Borussia Mönchengladbach after half-time. Overall, he made eight appearances for the first team. In July 2009 he moved on to RW Essen and was a starter for the club scoring 7 goals in 29 matches. On 14 June 2010 he joined Sportfreunde Lotte and remained at the club for one year making 30 appearances and scoring 5 goals.

For the 2011–12 season, he joined Dutch side Helmond Sport in the Jupiler League. In his first season with the club Stachnik was handed the number 10 shirt and appeared in 21 league matches scoring 6 goals. He helped the club to a fourth-place finish and a spot in the promotion playoffs. The following season he appeared in 24 league matches and scored 5 goals as once again Helmond Sport finished in fourth place. In July 2013, he returned to his hometown to sign for Viktoria Berlin of the Regionalliga Nordost.
