= Italian frigate Aviere =

Soldati-class frigate

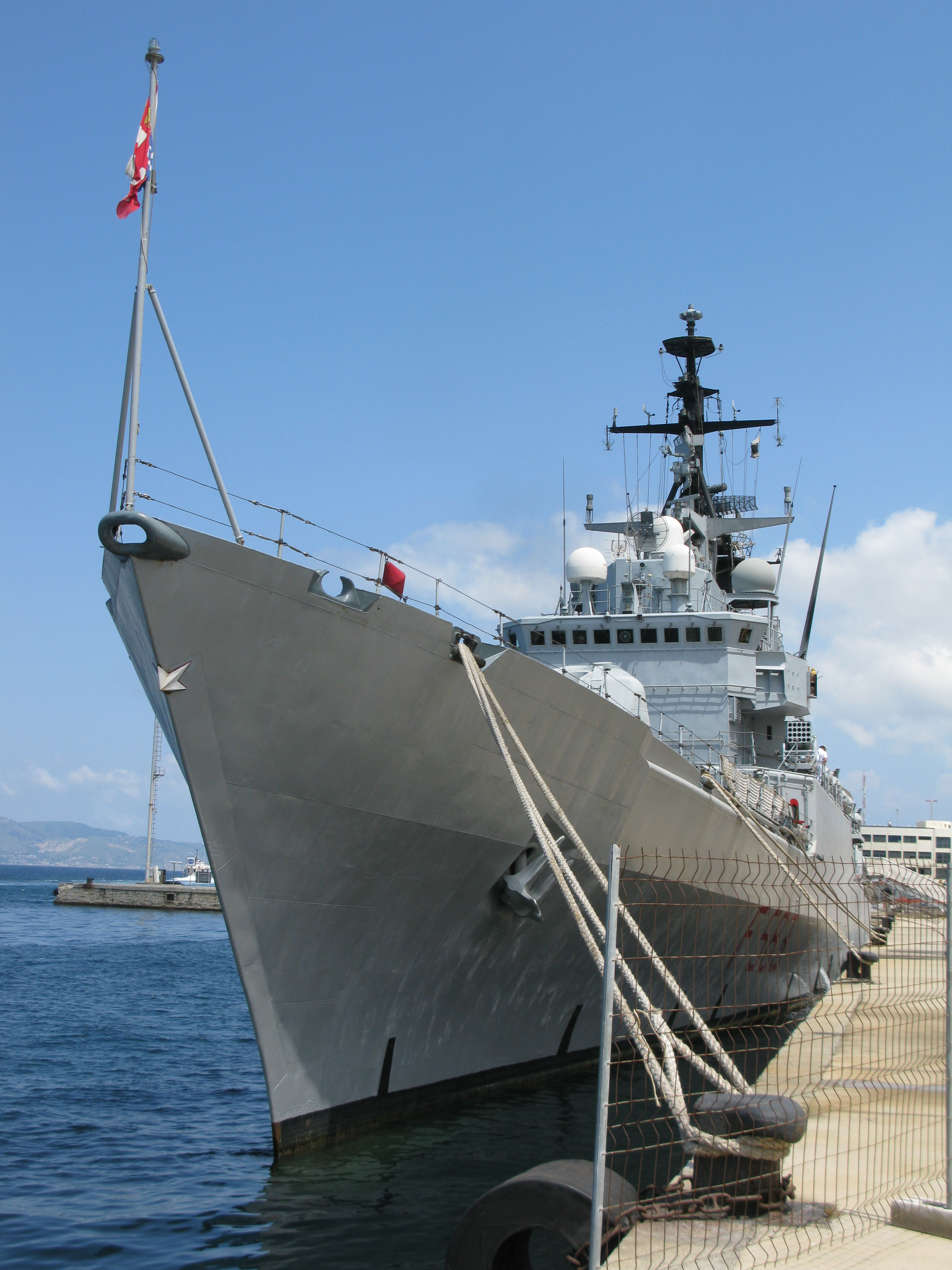
- Aviere on 8 July 2018

History

Italy
- Name: Aviere
- Namesake: Aviere
- Builder: Fincantieri, Ancona
- Laid down: 3 September 1982
- Launched: 19 December 1984
- Commissioned: 4 January 1995
- Decommissioned: 2 October 2019
- Renamed: from Dhī Qār
- Home port: Taranto
- Identification: IMO number: 9876543; MMSI number: 247858000; Callsign: IAEQ; Pennant number: F 583
- Motto: Virtute Siderum Tenus; (Power of the stars down)
- Fate: Sold for scrap 2023

General characteristics
- Class & type: Soldati-class frigate
- Displacement: 2.506 t (2.466 long tons) full load
- Length: 113.2 m (371 ft) LOA
- Beam: 11.3 m (37 ft)
- Draft: 3.7 m (12 ft)
- Propulsion: - CODOG scheme; - 2 x shaft; - 2 x GE / Fiat LM2500 gas turbines 50,000 shp (37,000 kW); - 2 x diesel engines Grandi Motori Trieste GMT A230-20 diesel engines 7,800 shp (5.8 MW); - 4 x diesel engine generators Grandi Motori Trieste GMT 236SS, 3,000 kW (4,000 shp)
- Speed: 35 kn (65 km/h) with gas turbines; 21 kn (39 km/h) with diesels
- Range: 4,300 nmi (8,000 km) at 16 kn (30 km/h)
- Complement: 185 (20 officers)
- Sensors & processing systems: - Selenia SADOC 2 combat management system; - 1 x Selenia SPS-774 (RAN-10S) early warning radar; - 1 x Selenia SPQ-2F CORA OTH surface search radar; - 1 x Selenia SPS-702 (or RAN-11L/X) air/surface search radar; - 1 x Selenia SPG-70 (RTN-10X) fire control radar; - 1 x Raytheon Mk 95 fire control radar; - 2 x Selenia SPG-74 (RTN-20X) fire control radar; - 1 x GEM Elettronica AN/SPN-748 navigation radar; - Raytheon DE 1160B (SQS-56) hull sonar
- Electronic warfare & decoys: - SLR-4 ESM system; - SLQ-D ECM system; - AN/SLQ-25 Nixie torpedo decoy; - 2 x Breda SCLAR decoy launchers
- Armament: - 8 x Otomat Mk 2 SSMs; - 1 x Mk.29 octuple launcher for Sea Sparrow/Aspide SAM; - 2 x Mark 32 triple torpedo tubes; - 1 x OTO Melara 127/54 mm gun; - 2 x OTO Melara Twin 40L70 DARDO compact gun
- Aircraft carried: 1 AB-212ASW helicopter
- Aviation facilities: Flight deck: 25.2 m × 11.3 m (83 ft × 37 ft); Telescopic hangar for 1 medium helicopter.

Aviere (F-583) was the second ship of the Soldati-class frigate of the Italian Navy.

== Development and design ==
Iraq ordered four Lupo-class frigates from CNR in 1980 as part of a naval expansion program just before the Iran–Iraq War. These ships, which feature a telescopic hangar were completed between 1985 and 1987. Due to restrictions on arm sales to Iraq because of the Iran-Iraq War placed by the Italian prime minister Bettino Craxi, the ships remained interned in Italy until the end of that war in 1988. Iraqi President Saddam Hussein then tried to renegotiate the price of these ships (and the other ships purchased from Italy), claiming he should receive a discount due to the delay in delivery of the ships. Negotiations and court proceedings were still ongoing when Iraq invaded Kuwait in 1990 and a new arms embargo against Iraq was placed by the United Nations, again blocking the sale. In 1993 all of them were seized and, after being refitted as patrol ships, incorporated to the Italian Navy as the Soldati class in 1996. Changes made for Italian service included the removal of all ASW equipment. The four ships are Artigliere (pennant F 582), Aviere (F 583), Bersagliere (F 584) and Granatiere (F 585), and are used in fleet escort or long range patrolling duties. The Philippines considered acquiring the Soldati class in 2012.

== Construction and career ==
Aviere was laid down on 3 September 1982 and launched on 19 December 1984 by Fincantieri at Ancona. She was commissioned on 4 January 1995. In the early 1980s, the ship had been given the name Dhī Qār and the pennant number F-15.

From 18 November 2001, she took part in Operation Enduring Freedom, operating for 3 months in the Indian Ocean carrying out checks and inspections on merchant ships in transit in that area and conducting numerous escorts to naval units of the coalition, returning to Taranto on 18 March 2002.

In 2004, 2005, 2008, 2009 and 2010 took part in Operation Active Endeavor, a naval military operation of NATO in the Mediterranean to prevent movements of terrorists or trafficking in weapons of mass destruction and in general to ensure the safety of the navigation in the main maritime communication routes of the Mediterranean.

In 2009, it took part in the UNIFIL Operation, under the aegis of the UN, for the control of Lebanese territorial waters, which achieved the removal of the Israeli naval blockade and restored sovereignty over its territorial waters and freedom of navigation to Lebanon.

In 2010, she took part in Operation Joint Warrior, in the waters off the north-west of Scotland, when the ship was integrated into the SNMG2 device.

In 2011 and 2012, she took part in the editions of the IONIEX exercises, a bilateral Italian-Russian cooperation exercise to increase interoperability between the two navies with the participation of Black Sea Fleet Units of the Navy of the Russian Federation.

On a national level, in the last two years of service, she has participated in the OPEN SEA and AMPHEX exercises which also saw cooperation with the Army and the Air Force in a scenario that follows the latest crisis situations that broke out in the Mediterranean.

Ships of the Soldati-class are considered by the Navy to have reached operational limits. The decommissioning plan provides for its decommissioning in the sequence Artigliere, Granatiere, Aviere, Bersagliere. On 24 June 2018, the Aviere, together with Euro and Driade, left for the last naval campaign of her career after attending the Sea Future 2018 international exhibition at the Military Arsenal of La Spezia, with the students of 2nd course of the Francesco Morosini Military Naval School, and on 16 July 2018 the ceremony of dismissal from the roles is scheduled.

On 2 October 2019, at 18.00, at the quay of the Taranto military maritime arsenal, the Aviere, together with the Euro, carried out the last flagging in a solemn ceremony in the presence of the military, civil and religious. During the ceremony the combat flags of the two ships were delivered to the Commander in Chief of the Naval Squad, Division Admiral Donato Marzano and to the Chief of Staff of the Navy, squad admiral Giuseppe Cavo Dragone for forwarding to Rome and custody in the Shrine of the Flags of the Armed Forces, inside the Altar of the Fatherland.

== Gallery ==
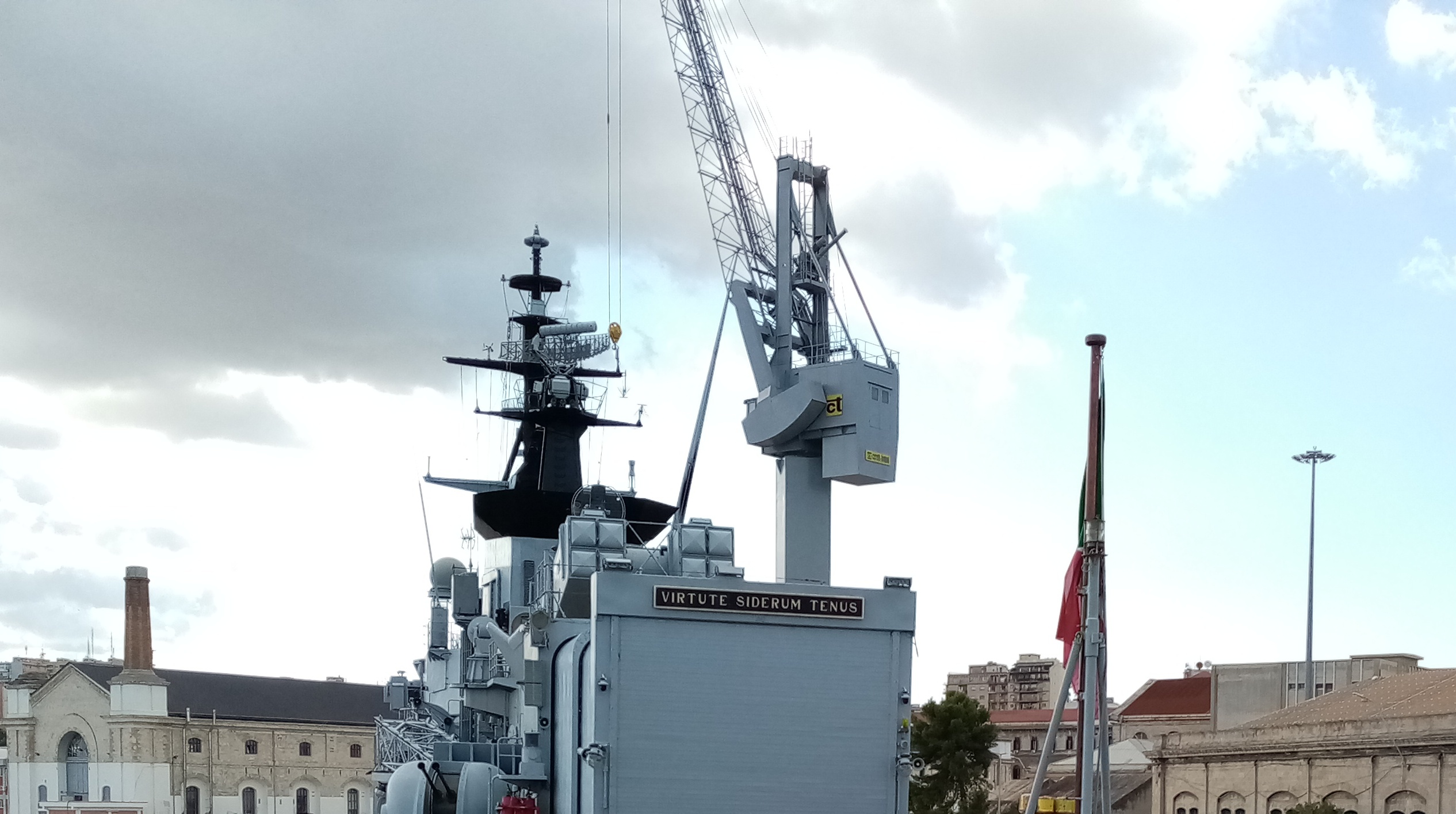
Aviere on 24 September 2019.
