= John Valencia (footballer, born 1982) =

Colombian footballer

Personal information
- Full name: John Alexander Valencia Hinestroza
- Date of birth: January 4, 1982 (age 44)
- Place of birth: Medellín, Colombia
- Height: 6 ft 4 in (1.93 m)
- Position: Defender

Senior career*
Years	Team	Apps	(Gls)
2005–2006	Independiente Medellín	14	(1)
2005	→ Oțelul Galați (loan)	4	(0)
2006	Atlético Bucaramanga	17	(3)
2007–2012	Atlético Junior	114	(3)
2012	Chivas USA	13	(0)
2013–2016	Deportes Tolima	75	(2)
2017	Rionegro Águilas	12	(0)
Total		249	(9)
- * Club domestic league appearances and goals as of June 23, 2017

John Alexander Valencia Hinestroza (born January 4, 1982) is a Colombian retired footballer who played as a defender.

== Career ==
Valencia began his career in the youth ranks of top Colombian side Independiente Medellín and made his first team debut in 2005. During the 2005 season he was also sent on loan to Romanian club Oțelul Galați. After a brief stay in Romania he returned to Colombia signing with Atlético Bucaramanga. His play with Bucaramanga helped him receive interest from Atlético Junior who than signed Valencia for the 2007 season. Since signing, Valencia established himself as a starter for the Barranquilla club. Valencia helped the club in capturing Categoría Primera A championships in 2010 and 2011.

On January 24, 2012, Valencia signed with Major League Soccer side Chivas USA. His 2013 contract option was declined by the club on February 14, 2013.

== Titles ==
Season	Club	Title
2010	Atlético Junior	Categoría Primera A - Torneo Apertura
2011	Atlético Junior	Categoría Primera A - Torneo Finalización
2014	Deportes Tolima	Copa Colombia
