= José Nájera (footballer) =

Colombian footballer (born 1988)

Personal information
- Full name: José Manuel Nájera
- Date of birth: 3 September 1988 (age 38)
- Place of birth: Medellín, Colombia
- Height: 1.82 m (5 ft 11 1/2 in)
- Position: Midfielder

Team information
- Current team: Unión Comercio
- Number: 15

Senior career*
Years	Team	Apps	(Gls)
2006–2012	Real Cartagena	136	(24)
2013–2014	La Equidad	40	(2)
2014–2015	Mineros de Guayana	3	(0)
2015	Atlético Bucaramanga	15	(1)
2016–	Unión Comercio	2	(0)

International career
2009	Colombia	1	(0)
- * Club domestic league appearances and goals

José Manuel Nájera (born 3 September 1988) is a Colombian football creative midfielder. He currently plays for Unión Comercio.

== Career ==
Nájera helped Real Cartagena gain promotion to Categoría Primera A in 2008. He was the club's top goal-scorer in the Primera A, scoring 21 goals in 88 matches in three seasons. and played for Real Cartagena in the Copa Mustang.

He played once for the Colombia national football team in 2009.
