= Topos de Reynosa FC =

Topos de Reynosa
- Full name: Topos de Reynosa Futbol Club
- Nickname: Nacionales
- Founded: 2012
- Dissolved: June 19, 2015
- Ground: Unidad Deportiva Solidaridad, Reynosa, Tamaulipas
- Capacity: 20,000
- League: Segunda División Profesional
Home colours	Away colours

old crest

Topos de Reynosa F.C. was a Mexican football club that played in the Liga Premier de Ascenso of the Segunda División Profesional. The club was based in Reynosa, Tamaulipas. The club was recently founded and had a new stadium of the arts to its own. But they dissolved on June 19, 2015 after they were not chosen to play in the Liga Nuevo Talentos, thus leaving Reynosa F.C. in the Liga Premier as the only team in Reynosa.
