= Giorgio Lazio =

Italian Navy officer

- Military career
- Allegiance: Italy
- Branch: Italian Navy
- Rank: Rear Admiral
- Commands: Chief of Staff MARCOM; ITS Garibaldi

Rear Admiral Giorgio Lazio is an Italian Navy officer. He is designated as the next Commander Maritime Command North (Comandante del Comando Marittimo Nord).

He graduated from the Italian Naval Academy in 1983.

He has completed a degree in Maritime and Naval Sciences as well as a master's degree in International Strategic-Military Studies.
