= 2007 Chivas USA season =

Chivas USA
2007 season
- Owner: Jorge Vergara
- Manager: Preki
- MLS: Conference: 1st Overall: 2nd
- MLS Cup Playoffs: Conference Semifinal vs Kansas City Wizards
- U.S. Open Cup: Third round vs Seattle Sounders
- Top goalscorer: League: Maykel Galindo (12); All: Maykel Galindo (12)
| Home colors | Away colors |

The 2007 Chivas USA season was the club's third season of existence, and their third in Major League Soccer, the top flight of American soccer. The club competed in the MLS's Western Conference, where they finished in first place, in their Conference, qualifying for the Playoffs for the second time.

== Season review ==
On November 23, 2005, Chivas appointed Bob Bradley as their new manager. Bradley left the club on January 17, 2007, to become manager of the United States men's national team and was replaced by assistant coach Preki.

== Transfers ==
=== In ===
| Date | Number | Position | Player | Previous club | Fee/notes | Ref |
|---|---|---|---|---|---|---|
| November 27, 2006 | 20 | MF | (Honduras) Amado Guevara | New York Red Bulls | Trade | |
| January 12, 2007 | 12 | FW | (England) John Cunliffe | Fort Lewis Skyhawks | SuperDraft Round one | |
| January 12, 2007 | | DF | (United States) Cameron Dunn | UC Irvine Anteaters | SuperDraft Round one | |
| January 18, 2007 | 4 | DF | (United States) Desmond Brooks | Saint Mary's Gaels | Supplemental Round one | |
| January 18, 2007 | 28 | MF | (Mexico) Erasmo Solorzano | UC Riverside Highlanders | Supplemental Round two | |
| January 18, 2007 | | DF | (United States) Raul Batista | San Diego State Aztecs | Supplemental Round two | |
| January 18, 2007 | 32 | FW | (United States) Anthony Hamilton | UC Irvine Anteaters | Supplemental Round three | |
| January 18, 2007 | | DF | (United States) Lyle Martin | Cal State Bakersfield Roadrunners | Supplemental Round three | |
| April 12, 2007 | 10 | FW | (France) Laurent Merlin | (France) Ajaccio | | |
| May 3, 2007 | 4 | DF | (Jamaica) Shavar Thomas | LA Galaxy | Trade | |
| May 2007 | 26 | MF | (Brazil) Paulo Nagamura | Toronto | Trade | |
| July 2007 | 19 | FW | (United States) Jorge Flores | Chivas USA U19 | | |
| August 15, 2007 | 8 | MF | (Honduras) Ramón Núñez | FC Dallas | Trade | |
| | 11 | FW | (Cuba) Maykel Galindo | Seattle Sounders | | |
| | 14 | FW | (United States) David Arvizu | New York Red Bulls | | |
| | 23 | DF | (Romania) Alex Zotincă | Kansas City Wizards | Trade | |
| | 24 | DF | (United States) Bobby Burling | LA Galaxy | | |
| | 41 | GK | (United States) Justin Myers | San Diego Gauchos | | |

=== Out ===
| Date | Number | Position | Player | New club | Fee/notes | Ref |
|---|---|---|---|---|---|---|
| November 17, 2006 | 24 | DF | (United States) Tim Regan | Toronto FC | Expansion Draft | |
| January 2007 | 17 | FW | (Mexico) Francisco Palencia | (Mexico) Pumas | | |
| July 25, 2007 | 19 | FW | (United States) Matt Taylor | Portland Timbers | | |
| | 8 | DF | (Mexico) Johnny García | (Mexico) Chiapas | | |
| | 14 | DF | (United States) Esteban Arias | | Waived | |
| | 4 | MF | (United States) Brent Whitfield | | Waived | |
| | 7 | MF | (Mexico) Ramón Ramírez | Retired | | |
| | 10 | MF | (Mexico) Juan Pablo García | (Mexico) Tigres UANL | | |
| | 11 | MF | (United States) John O'Brien | | Waived | |
| | 12 | MF | (United States) Mike Muñoz | California Victory | | |
| | 22 | FW | (Mexico) Jesús Morales | (Mexico) Guadalajara | Loan Return | |
| | 28 | FW | (United States) Drew Helm | (Portugal) Marinhas | | |
| | 29 | FW | (United States) Estuardo Sanchez | | | |
| | 20 | MF | (Honduras) Amado Guevara | (Honduras) Motagua | Loan | |

== Roster ==
| No. | Name | Nationality | Position | Date of birth (age) | Signed from | Signed in | Contract ends | Apps. | Goals |
Goalkeepers
| 18 | Brad Guzan | (United States) | GK | September 9, 1984 (aged 23) | Generation Adidas | 2005 | | | |
| 22 | Preston Burpo | (United States) | GK | September 26, 1972 (aged 35) | Seattle Sounders | 2006 | | | |
| 41 | Justin Myers | (United States) | GK | January 15, 1985 (aged 22) | San Diego Gauchos | 2007 | | 0 | 0 |
Defenders
| 2 | Claudio Suárez | (Mexico) | DF | December 17, 1968 (aged 38) | (Mexico) Tigres UANL | 2006 | | | |
| 3 | Carlos Llamosa | (United States) | DF | June 30, 1969 (aged 38) | New England Revolution | 2006 | | | |
| 4 | Shavar Thomas | (Jamaica) | DF | January 29, 1981 (aged 26) | LA Galaxy | 2007 | | 25 | 0 |
| 5 | Desmond Brooks | (United States) | DF | November 27, 1985 (aged 21) | | 2007 | | 0 | 0 |
| 13 | Jonathan Bornstein | (United States) | DF | November 7, 1984 (aged 22) | UCLA Bruin | 2006 | | | |
| 21 | Jason Hernandez | (United States) | DF | August 26, 1983 (aged 24) | New York Red Bulls | 2006 | | | |
| 23 | Alex Zotincă | (Romania) | DF | January 22, 1977 (aged 30) | Kansas City Wizards | 2007 | | 24 | 0 |
| 24 | Bobby Burling | (United States) | DF | October 15, 1984 (aged 23) | LA Galaxy | 2007 | | 0 | 0 |
| 25 | Lawson Vaughn | (United States) | DF | April 11, 1984 (aged 23) | Tulsa Golden | 2006 | | | |
| 27 | Eder Robles | (United States) | DF | July 7, 1988 (aged 19) | Chivas USA Academy | 2006 | | | |
| 77 | Orlando Perez | (United States) | DF | July 12, 1977 (aged 30) | Chicago Fire | 2005 | | | |
Midfielders
| 6 | Francisco Mendoza | (Mexico) | MF | April 29, 1985 (aged 22) | (Mexico) Guadalajara | 2005 | | | |
| 8 | Ramón Núñez | (Honduras) | MF | November 14, 1985 (aged 21) | FC Dallas | 2007 | | 10 | 0 |
| 15 | Jesse Marsch | (United States) | MF | November 8, 1973 (aged 33) | Chicago Fire | 2006 | | 0 | 0 |
| 16 | Sacha Kljestan | (United States) | MF | September 9, 1985 (aged 22) | Seton Hall Pirates | 2006 | | 0 | 0 |
| 17 | Rodrigo López | (United States) | MF | May 10, 1987 (aged 20) | (Mexico) Guadalajara | 2005 | | | |
| 26 | Paulo Nagamura | (Brazil) | MF | March 2, 1983 (aged 24) | Toronto | 2007 | | 24 | 2 |
| 28 | Erasmo Solórzano | (Mexico) | MF | July 20, 1985 (aged 22) | Los Angeles Storm | 2007 | | 1 | 0 |
| 30 | Carlos Borja | (United States) | MF | January 18, 1988 (aged 19) | IMG Academy | 2006 | | | |
| 31 | Rene Corona | (United States) | MF | August 17, 1984 (aged 23) | Corona Crew | 2006 | | | |
| 33 | Mohammed Sethi | (United States) | MF | December 7, 1987 (aged 19) | | 2007 | | 0 | 0 |
Forwards
| 9 | Ante Razov | (United States) | FW | March 2, 1974 (aged 33) | New York Red Bulls | 2006 | | | |
| 10 | Laurent Merlin | (France) | FW | October 17, 1984 (aged 23) | (France) Ajaccio | 2007 | | 24 | 2 |
| 11 | Maykel Galindo | (Cuba) | FW | January 28, 1981 (aged 26) | Seattle Sounders | 2007 | | 30 | 12 |
| 12 | John Cunliffe | (England) | FW | August 8, 1984 (aged 23) | Boulder Rapids Reserve | 2007 | | 18 | 3 |
| 14 | David Arvizu | (United States) | FW | April 19, 1988 (aged 19) | New York Red Bulls | 2007 | | 0 | 0 |
| 19 | Jorge Flores | (United States) | FW | September 16, 1989 (aged 18) | Chivas USA Academy | 2007 | | 1 | 0 |
| 32 | Anthony Hamilton | (United States) | FW | August 26, 1985 (aged 22) | Orange County Blue Star | 2007 | | 2 | 0 |
Left Chivas USA
| 19 | Matt Taylor | (United States) | FW | October 17, 1981 (aged 26) | Portland Timbers | 2006 | | | |
| 20 | Amado Guevara | (Honduras) | MF | May 2, 1976 (aged 31) | loan to (Honduras) Motagua | 2007 | | 4 | 0 |

== Competitions ==
=== MLS ===
==== League table ====
Western Conference
| Pos | Club | Pts | GP | W | L | T | GF | GA | GD |
| 1 | Chivas USA | 53 | 30 | 15 | 7 | 8 | 46 | 28 | 18 |
| 2 | Houston Dynamo | 52 | 30 | 15 | 8 | 7 | 43 | 23 | 20 |
| 3 | FC Dallas | 44 | 30 | 13 | 12 | 5 | 37 | 44 | -7 |
| 4 | Colorado Rapids | 35 | 30 | 9 | 13 | 8 | 29 | 34 | -5 |
| 5 | LA Galaxy | 34 | 30 | 9 | 14 | 7 | 38 | 48 | -10 |
| 6 | Real Salt Lake | 27 | 30 | 6 | 15 | 9 | 31 | 45 | -14 |

==== Results summary ====
| Overall | | | | | | | | Home | | | | | | Away | | | | | |
| Pld | Pts | W | L | T | GF | GA | GD | W | L | T | GF | GA | GD | W | L | T | GF | GA | GD |
|---|---|---|---|---|---|---|---|---|---|---|---|---|---|---|---|---|---|---|---|
| 0 | 0 | 0 | 0 | 0 | 0 | 0 | 0 | 0 | 0 | 0 | 0 | 0 | 0 | 0 | 0 | 0 | 0 | 0 | 0 |

Last updated: October 16, 2007
Source: ESPNSoccernet.com
Pld = Matches played; Pts = Points; W = Matches won; T = Matches tied; L = Matches lost; GF = Goals for; GA = Goals against; GD = Goal difference

==== Results ====
| April 7, 2007 1 | Chivas USA | 2–0 | Toronto | Carson |
| 16:30 PST | Razov 35'; Zotincă (yellow card) 84'; Kljestan 88' | Report | Cañizalez (yellow card) 61'; Nagamura (yellow card) 77' | Stadium: The Home Depot Center |

| April 14, 2007 2 | Houston Dynamo | 1–0 | Chivas USA | Houston |
| 16:30 PST | Mullan (yellow card) 13'; Robinson (yellow card) 57'; Ching 64' | Report | Razov (yellow card) 30'; Suárez (yellow card) 41' | Stadium: Robertson Stadium |

| April 21, 2007 3 | Chivas USA | 4–0 | Real Salt Lake | Carson |
| 16:30 PST | Galindo 1', 9' (yellow card) 25'; Razov 43'; Marsch (yellow card) 68'; Kljestan (yellow card) 76'; Taylor 89' | Report | | Stadium: The Home Depot Center |

| April 28, 2007 4 | LA Galaxy | 3–1 | Chivas USA | Carson |
| 16:30 PST | Donovan 8'; Harmse 17' (yellow card) 58'; Martino (yellow card) 55'; Jones 78' | Report | Zotincă (yellow card) 13'; Marsch (yellow card) 41'; Suárez 63'; Mendoza (yellow card) 78' | Stadium: The Home Depot Center |

| May 6, 2007 5 | D.C. United | 2–1 | Chivas USA | Washington, D.C. |
| 12:00 PST | Moose (yellow card) 21'; Gómez 48'; Moreno 65' (pen.); Casal (yellow card) 69'; Olsen (yellow card) 74'; Namoff (yellow card) 83' | Report | Nagamura (yellow card) 52'; Galindo (yellow card) 55' (goal) 73'; Mendoza (yellow card) 83'; Merlin (yellow card) 88' | Stadium: RFK Stadium |

| May 12, 2007 6 | Columbus Crew | 1–1 | Chivas USA | Columbus |
| 16:30 PST | González (yellow card) 1'; Grabavoy 18'; Hendrickson (yellow card) 54'; Pierce (yellow card) 70' | Report | Razov 2'; Marsch (yellow card) 13'; Kljestan (yellow card) 49'; Suárez (yellow card) 75'; Vaughn (yellow card) 82'; Hernandez (yellow card) 87' | Stadium: Crew Stadium |

| May 20, 2007 7 | Chivas USA | 1–1 | LA Galaxy | Carson |
| 13:00 PST | Galindo 35' | Report | Donovan 50'; Harden (yellow card) 57' | Stadium: The Home Depot Center |

| May 26, 2007 8 | Chivas USA | 2–0 | FC Dallas | Carson |
| 16:30 PST | Galindo 50'; Suárez (yellow card) 69'; Razov 90+2' | Report | Ricchetti (yellow card) 20' | Stadium: The Home Depot Center |

| June 9, 2007 9 | Chicago Fire | 0–1 | Chivas USA | Chicago |
| 16:30 PST | Soumaré (yellow card) 24'; Brown (yellow card) 45+2' | Report | Kljestan (yellow card) 21'; Nagamura 79' | Stadium: Toyota Park |

| June 16, 2007 10 | Chivas USA | 2–0 | Colorado Rapids | Carson |
| 16:30 PST | Perez (yellow card) 34'; Cooke 49' (o.g.); Galindo 63'; Zotincă (yellow card) 90+1' | Report | Brown (yellow card) 59' | Stadium: The Home Depot Center |

| June 22, 2007 11 | Houston Dynamo | 4–0 | Chivas USA | Houston |
| 17:00 PST | Mullan (yellow card) 6'; Davis 55', 70', 75' (pen.); Robinson (yellow card) 60' | Report | Nagamura (yellow card) 22'; Thomas (red card) 66' | Stadium: Robertson Stadium |

| June 30, 2007 12 | Chivas USA | 2–0 | New England Revolution | Carson |
| 16:30 PST | Perez (yellow card) 21'; Marsch 60'; Vaughn (yellow card) 70'; Nagamura (yellow card) 80' Suárez (red card) 81'; Galindo 89'; Zotincă (yellow card) 90+2' | Report | Thompson (yellow card) 65' | Stadium: The Home Depot Center |

| July 4, 2007 13 | FC Dallas | 2–0 | Chivas USA | Dallas |
| 14:30 PST | Núñez 41'; Toja (yellow card) 63'; Oduro 86' | Report | Perez (yellow card) 17'; Vaughn (yellow card) 57'; Hernandez (yellow card) 65' | Stadium: Cotton Bowl |

| July 7, 2007 14 | New England Revolution | 1–1 | Chivas USA | Foxborough |
| 16:30 PST | John (yellow card) 13'; Joseph (yellow card) 57'; Dorman 64'; Heaps (yellow card) 69'; Noonan (yellow card) 90+4' | Report | Suárez 4' (yellow card) 29'; Zotincă (yellow card) 25' | Stadium: Gillette Stadium |

| July 14, 2007 15 | Chivas USA | 2–1 | Columbus Crew | Carson |
| 16:30 PST | Razov 19'; Gaven 69' (o.g.); Galindo (yellow card) 76' | Report | Miglioranzi 23' | Stadium: The Home Depot Center |

| July 26, 2007 16 | New York Red Bulls | 0–2 | Chivas USA | East Rutherford |
| 16:00 PST | Stammler (yellow card) 12' | Report | Razov 38'; Galindo (yellow card) 69'; Kljestan 87' | Stadium: Giants Stadium |

| July 29, 2007 17 | Kansas City Wizards | 3–2 | Chivas USA | Kansas City |
| 15:00 PST | Jewsbury (yellow card) 5'; Zavagnin 37'; Arnaud 53'; Marinelli (yellow card) 71'; Movsisyan 89' | Report | Vaughn (yellow card) 10'; Bornstein 17'; Thomas (yellow card) 42'; Marsch (yellow card) 45'; Cunliffe 55'; Suárez (yellow card) 90+1' | Stadium: Arrowhead Stadium |

| August 18, 2007 18 | Toronto | 0–2 | Chivas USA | Toronto |
| 12:30 PST | | Report | Galindo 56'; Hernandez (yellow card) 81'; Kljestan 88'; Guzan (yellow card) 90+2' | Stadium: BMO Field |

| August 23, 2007 19 | LA Galaxy | 0–3 | Chivas USA | Carson |
| 16:00 PST | Xavier (yellow card) 40'; Harmse (red card) 45+3'; Martino (yellow card) 61' | Report | Perez (yellow card) 26'; Vaughn (yellow card) 41'; Marsch (yellow card) 45+2'; Galindo 58', 69'; Mendoza 88' | Stadium: The Home Depot Center |

| August 26, 2007 20 | Chivas USA | 1–0 | Real Salt Lake | Carson |
| 15:00 PST | Marsch 31'; Kljestan (yellow card) 89' | Report | Harris (yellow card) 36'; Espíndola (yellow card) 59' | Stadium: The Home Depot Center |

| September 6, 2007 21 | Chivas USA | 2–2 | D.C. United | Carson |
| 16:30 PST | Razov 31'; Vaughn 60' | Report | Emílio 3', 26'; Namoff (yellow card) 33'; Burch (yellow card) 54'; Vanney (yellow card) 69' | Stadium: The Home Depot Center |

| September 9, 2007 22 | Chivas USA | 3–0 | New York Red Bulls | Carson |
| 14:00 PST | Galindo 4', 58' (yellow card) 55'; Razov 70' (pen.) | Report | | Stadium: The Home Depot Center |

| September 14, 2007 23 | Chivas USA | 3–0 | LA Galaxy | Carson |
| 17:00 PST | Marsch (yellow card) 2'; Razov 23'; Nagamura (yellow card) 83'; Mendoza 88'; Merlin 90+1' | Report | Donovan (yellow card) 53'; Xavier (yellow card) 69'; Vagenas (yellow card) 71' | Stadium: The Home Depot Center |

| September 16, 2007 24 | Colorado Rapids | 1–1 | Chivas USA | Denver |
| 10:00 PST | Erpen (red card) 12'; Mastroeni (yellow card) 41'; Clark 76' | Report | Kljestan 13' (pen.); Marsch (yellow card) 60' | Stadium: Invesco Field at Mile High |

| September 22, 2007 25 | Chivas USA | 2–1 | Kansas City Wizards | Carson |
| 16:30 PST | Kljestan (yellow card) 64'; Vaughn (yellow card) 67'; Razov 69', 90+2' (yellow card) 90+3'; Núñez (yellow card) 81' | Report | Colombano 72' (yellow card) 73' | Stadium: The Home Depot Center |

| September 29, 2007 26 | Chivas USA | 1–1 | Chicago Fire | Carson |
| 16:30 PST | Marsch (yellow card) 24'; Nagamura (yellow card) 32'; Galindo (yellow card) 54'; Suárez 82' (pen.) | Report | Blanco 24' (yellow card) 85'; Armas (yellow card) 28'; Conde (yellow card) 36' | Stadium: The Home Depot Center |

| October 6, 2007 27 | Real Salt Lake | 2–3 | Chivas USA | Salt Lake City |
| 16:00 PST | Brown 52'; Findley 63' | Report | Zotincă (yellow card) 9'; Cunliffe 22', 54'; Marsch (yellow card) 41'; Nagamura 58' | Stadium: Rice-Eccles Stadium |

| October 12, 2007 28 | FC Dallas | 0–0 | Chivas USA | Dallas |
| 17:00 PST | Álvarez (yellow card) 80'; Rhine (red card) 81' | Report | Mendoza (yellow card) 68' | Stadium: Cotton Bowl |

| October 14, 2007 29 | Chivas USA | 1–2 | Colorado Rapids | Carson |
| 09:00 PST | Suárez (yellow card) 31'; Thomas (yellow card) 55'; Perez 78'; Bornstein (yellow card) 84'; Perez (yellow card) 88' | Report | Prideaux (red card) 46'; Ihemelu 64'; Clark (yellow card) 65'; Cummings 90' | Stadium: The Home Depot Center |

| October 20, 2007 30 | Chivas USA | 0–0 | Houston Dynamo | Carson |
| 16:30 PST | Vaughn (red card) 40' | Report | Barrett (yellow card) 45+1'; Ianni (yellow card) 68'; Mulrooney (yellow card) 82'; Mullan (yellow card) 90' | Stadium: The Home Depot Center |

=== MLS Cup Playoffs ===
| October 27, 2007 Conference Semifinal 1st leg | Kansas City Wizards | 1–0 | Chivas USA | Kansas City |
| 17:00 PST | Arnaud 35'; Harrington (yellow card) 44'; Garcia (yellow card) 54'; Zavagnin (yellow card) 88' | Report | Zotincă (yellow card) 45+1' | Stadium: Arrowhead Stadium; Attendance: 12,442; Referee: Alex Prus |

| November 3, 2007 Conference Semifinal 2nd leg | Chivas USA | 0–0 (0–1 agg.) | Kansas City Wizards | Carson |
| 19:30 PST | Marsch (yellow card) 19'; Mendoza (yellow card) 53'; Núñez (yellow card) 62'; Bornstein (yellow card) 89' | Report | Johnson (yellow card) 65' | Stadium: The Home Depot Center; Attendance: 19,711; Referee: Mark Geiger |

=== U.S. Open Cup ===
| July 18, 2007 Third round | Seattle Sounders | 3–1 | Chivas USA | Seattle |
| 19:30 PST | Le Toux 44', 50'; Scott (yellow card) 55'; Levesque 81' | Report | Merlin 16' | Stadium: Qwest Field; Attendance: 3,589; Referee: Richard Heron |

=== Friendlies ===
| June 2, 2007 | Seattle Sounders | 1–3 | Chivas USA | Seattle |
| 19:00 PST | Le Toux 12' | Report | Suárez 14' (pen.); Galindo 27'; Cunliffe 57' | Stadium: Qwest Field; Attendance: 5,599; Referee: Jeff Hosking |

== Statistics ==
=== Appearances and goals ===
As of Match played November 3, 2007

| No. | Pos | Nat | Player | Total | | MLS | | Playoffs | | U.S. Open Cup | |
| No. | Pos | Nat | Player | Apps | Goals | Apps | Goals | Apps | Goals | Apps | Goals |
|---|---|---|---|---|---|---|---|---|---|---|---|
| 2 | DF | (Mexico) MEX | Claudio Suárez | 28 | 3 | 25 | 3 | 2 | 0 | 1 | 0 |
| 4 | DF | (Jamaica) JAM | Shavar Thomas | 25 | 0 | 23 | 0 | 2 | 0 | 0 | 0 |
| 6 | MF | (Mexico) MEX | Francisco Mendoza | 31 | 2 | 27+1 | 2 | 2 | 0 | 1 | 0 |
| 8 | MF | (Honduras) HON | Ramón Núñez | 10 | 0 | 2+6 | 0 | 1+1 | 0 | 0 | 0 |
| 9 | FW | (United States) USA | Ante Razov | 26 | 11 | 24+2 | 11 | 0 | 0 | 0 | 0 |
| 10 | FW | (France) FRA | Laurent Merlin | 24 | 2 | 7+15 | 1 | 1 | 0 | 1 | 1 |
| 11 | FW | (Cuba) CUB | Maykel Galindo | 30 | 12 | 24+4 | 12 | 1 | 0 | 1 | 0 |
| 12 | FW | (England) ENG | John Cunliffe | 18 | 3 | 5+10 | 3 | 0+2 | 0 | 0+1 | 0 |
| 13 | DF | (United States) USA | Jonathan Bornstein | 25 | 1 | 23 | 1 | 2 | 0 | 0 | 0 |
| 15 | MF | (United States) USA | Jesse Marsch | 31 | 2 | 28 | 2 | 2 | 0 | 1 | 0 |
| 16 | MF | (United States) USA | Sacha Kljestan | 28 | 4 | 25 | 4 | 2 | 0 | 1 | 0 |
| 17 | MF | (United States) USA | Rodrigo López | 6 | 0 | 0+5 | 0 | 0 | 0 | 0+1 | 0 |
| 18 | GK | (United States) USA | Brad Guzan | 29 | 0 | 27 | 0 | 2 | 0 | 0 | 0 |
| 19 | FW | (United States) USA | Jorge Flores | 1 | 0 | 0+1 | 0 | 0 | 0 | 0 | 0 |
| 21 | DF | (United States) USA | Jason Hernandez | 23 | 0 | 9+12 | 0 | 1 | 0 | 1 | 0 |
| 22 | GK | (United States) USA | Preston Burpo | 4 | 0 | 3 | 0 | 0 | 0 | 1 | 0 |
| 23 | DF | (Romania) ROU | Alex Zotincă | 24 | 0 | 20+2 | 0 | 1 | 0 | 1 | 0 |
| 25 | DF | (United States) USA | Lawson Vaughn | 26 | 1 | 22+2 | 1 | 1 | 0 | 1 | 0 |
| 26 | MF | (Brazil) BRA | Paulo Nagamura | 24 | 2 | 20+2 | 2 | 2 | 0 | 0 | 0 |
| 28 | MF | (Mexico) MEX | Erasmo Solórzano | 1 | 0 | 0+1 | 0 | 0 | 0 | 0 | 0 |
| 32 | FW | (United States) USA | Anthony Hamilton | 4 | 0 | 0+2 | 0 | 0+1 | 0 | 0+1 | 0 |
| 77 | DF | (United States) USA | Orlando Perez | 16 | 1 | 12+3 | 1 | 0 | 0 | 1 | 0 |
Players away from Chivas USA on loan:
| 20 | MF | (Honduras) HON | Amado Guevara | 4 | 0 | 4 | 0 | 0 | 0 | 0 | 0 |
Players who left Chivas USA during the season:
| 19 | FW | (United States) USA | Matt Taylor | 11 | 1 | 0+11 | 1 | 0 | 0 | 0 | 0 |

=== Goal scorers ===
| Place | Position | Nation | Number | Name | MLS | MLS Cup Playoffs | U.S. Open Cup | Total |
|---|---|---|---|---|---|---|---|---|
| 1 | FW | (Cuba) | 11 | Maykel Galindo | 12 | 0 | 0 | 12 |
| 2 | FW | (United States) | 9 | Ante Razov | 11 | 0 | 0 | 11 |
| 3 | MF | (United States) | 16 | Sacha Kljestan | 4 | 0 | 0 | 4 |
| 4 | FW | (England) | 12 | John Cunliffe | 3 | 0 | 0 | 3 |
| 4 | DF | (Mexico) | 2 | Claudio Suárez | 3 | 0 | 0 | 3 |
| 6 | MF | (Mexico) | 6 | Francisco Mendoza | 2 | 0 | 0 | 2 |
| 6 | MF | (United States) | 15 | Jesse Marsch | 2 | 0 | 0 | 2 |
| 6 | MF | (Brazil) | 26 | Paulo Nagamura | 2 | 0 | 0 | 2 |
| 6 | | | | Own goal | 2 | 0 | 0 | 2 |
| 6 | FW | (France) | 10 | Laurent Merlin | 1 | 0 | 1 | 2 |
| 11 | DF | (United States) | 13 | Jonathan Bornstein | 1 | 0 | 0 | 1 |
| 11 | DF | (United States) | 25 | Lawson Vaughn | 1 | 0 | 0 | 1 |
| 11 | DF | (United States) | 77 | Orlando Perez | 1 | 0 | 0 | 1 |
| 11 | FW | (United States) | 19 | Matt Taylor | 1 | 0 | 0 | 1 |
| | | | | TOTALS | 46 | 0 | 1 | 47 |

=== Disciplinary record ===
| Number | Nation | Position | Name | MLS | | MLS Cup Playoffs | | U.S. Open Cup | | Total | |
| Number | Nation | Position | Name | Booked | Sent off (straight red) | Booked | Sent off (straight red) | Booked | Sent off (straight red) | Booked | Sent off (straight red) |
| 2 | (Mexico) | DF | Claudio Suárez | 6 | 1 | 0 | 0 | 0 | 0 | 6 | 1 |
| 4 | (Jamaica) | DF | Shavar Thomas | 2 | 1 | 0 | 0 | 0 | 0 | 2 | 1 |
| 6 | (Mexico) | MF | Francisco Mendoza | 3 | 0 | 1 | 0 | 0 | 0 | 4 | 0 |
| 8 | (Honduras) | MF | Ramón Núñez | 1 | 0 | 1 | 0 | 0 | 0 | 2 | 0 |
| 9 | (United States) | FW | Ante Razov | 2 | 0 | 0 | 0 | 0 | 0 | 2 | 0 |
| 10 | (France) | FW | Laurent Merlin | 1 | 0 | 0 | 0 | 0 | 0 | 1 | 0 |
| 11 | (Cuba) | FW | Maykel Galindo | 6 | 0 | 0 | 0 | 0 | 0 | 6 | 0 |
| 13 | (United States) | DF | Jonathan Bornstein | 1 | 0 | 1 | 0 | 0 | 0 | 2 | 0 |
| 15 | (United States) | MF | Jesse Marsch | 9 | 0 | 1 | 0 | 0 | 0 | 10 | 0 |
| 16 | (United States) | MF | Sacha Kljestan | 5 | 0 | 0 | 0 | 0 | 0 | 5 | 0 |
| 18 | (United States) | GK | Brad Guzan | 1 | 0 | 0 | 0 | 0 | 0 | 1 | 0 |
| 21 | (United States) | DF | Jason Hernandez | 3 | 0 | 0 | 0 | 0 | 0 | 3 | 0 |
| 23 | (Romania) | DF | Alex Zotincă | 6 | 0 | 1 | 0 | 0 | 0 | 7 | 0 |
| 25 | (United States) | DF | Lawson Vaughn | 6 | 1 | 0 | 0 | 0 | 0 | 6 | 1 |
| 26 | (Brazil) | MF | Paulo Nagamura | 5 | 0 | 0 | 0 | 0 | 0 | 5 | 0 |
| 77 | (United States) | DF | Orlando Perez | 5 | 0 | 0 | 0 | 0 | 0 | 5 | 0 |
| | | | TOTALS | 62 | 3 | 5 | 0 | 0 | 0 | 67 | 3 |
