= 2006 MLS expansion draft =

Player draft for MLS teams

2006 MLS Expansion Draft

General information
- Date: November 17, 2006

Overview
- Expansion team: Toronto FC
- Expansion season: 2007

The 2006 MLS Expansion Draft, held on November 17, 2006 was a special draft for MLS expansion team Toronto FC. Toronto FC selected 10 players from a pool of players from current MLS clubs.

== Format ==
- Only one player could be selected from each team. Two of the league's 12 teams did not have a player selected.
- Teams were allowed to protect 11 players from their 28-man rosters. Generation adidas players were automatically protected, though players who had graduated from the program to the senior roster at the end of the 2006 season were not.
- Each team could only leave one senior international player unprotected.

== Expansion Draft ==
Pick	Player	Position	Previous Team
1	Paulo Nagamura	M	Los Angeles Galaxy
2	Danny O'Rourke	M	New York Red Bulls
3	José Cancela	F	New England Revolution
4	Adrian Serioux	M	Houston Dynamo
5	Nate Jaqua	F	Chicago Fire
6	Rod Dyachenko	M	D.C. United
7	Jason Kreis	F	Real Salt Lake
8	Tim Regan	D	Chivas USA
9	Ritchie Kotschau	D	Columbus Crew
10	Will Hesmer	GK	Kansas City Wizards

Following the draft, RSL traded a partial allocation (est. at US$125,000) to Toronto for Jason Kreis. Hesmer and O'Rourke were traded to Columbus for another allocation. Regan was traded to Red Bulls for forward Edson Buddle. Serioux was traded, along with Toronto's 2nd round 2007 MLS Superdraft pick to Dallas for midfielder Ronnie O'Brien. Nate Jaqua was traded to the Los Angeles Galaxy for a partial allocation. Dyachenko was later returned to D.C. for a future draft pick, Kotschau was released, and Cancela was later traded to the Colorado Rapids. Part way through the season Nagamura was later traded to Chivas USA for a 1st round 2008 MLS SuperDraft pick. This left no players from the expansion draft on the TFC roster.

== Team-by Team breakdown ==
=== Chicago Fire ===
Exposed	Protected	Exempt
Pascal Bedrossian	Chris Armas	Chad Barrett
CJ Brown	Jim Curtin	
Craig Capano	Iván Guerrero	
Calen Carr	Andy Herron	
Jeff Curtin	Justin Mapp	
Floyd Franks	Logan Pause	
Leonard Griffin	Matt Pickens	
Diego Gutierrez	Dasan Robinson	
Nate Jaqua	Chris Rolfe	
Ryan Johnson	Gonzalo Segares	
David Mahoney	Thiago	
Jared Montz		
Brian Plotkin		
Jordan Russolillo		
Adam Ruud		
Tony Sanneh		
Zach Thornton		
John Thorrington		
Idris Ughiovhe		

=== Chivas USA ===
Exposed	Protected	Exempt
Esteban Arias	Jonathan Bornstein	
Carlos Borja	Juan Pablo García	
Preston Burpo	Brad Guzan	
Rene Corona	Jason Hernandez	
Johnny García	Sacha Kljestan	
Drew Helm	Jesse Marsch	
Carlos Llamosa	Francisco Mendoza	
Rodrigo Lopez	Francisco Palencia	
Jesús Morales	Ante Razov	
Mike Muñoz	Claudio Suárez	
John O'Brien	Lawson Vaughn	
Orlando Perez		
Tim Regan		
Eder Robles		
Estuardo Sanchez		
Matt Taylor		
Brent Whitfield		

=== Colorado Rapids ===
Exposed	Protected	Exempt
Colin Clark	Kyle Beckerman	Jacob Peterson
Matt Crawford	Joe Cannon	
Eric Denton	Terry Cooke	
Dan Gargan	Bouna Coundoul	
Luchi Gonzalez	Hunter Freeman	
Sasha Gotsmanov	Nicolás Hernández	
Jordan Harvey	Aitor Karanka	
Matt Jordan	Thiago Martins	
Stephen Keel	Pablo Mastroeni	
Aaron King	Daniel Wasson	
Jovan Kirovski	Chris Wingert	
Clint Mathis		
Alain Nkong		
Fabrice Noel		
Mike Petke		
Melvin Tarley		

=== Columbus Crew ===
Exposed	Protected	Exempt
Ivan Becerra	Jason Garey	Kei Kamara
Marc Burch	Eddie Gaven	Danny Szetela
Jon Busch	Marcos González	Tim Ward
Knox Cameron	Ned Grabavoy	Jed Zayner
Ryan Coiner	Andy Gruenebaum	
Bill Gaudette	Frankie Hejduk	
Ezra Hendrickson	Chad Marshall	
Ritchie Kotschau	Joseph Ngwenya	
Chris Leitch	Duncan Oughton	
Brandon Moss	Jacob Thomas	
Noah Palmer	Ricardo Virtuoso	
Rusty Pierce		
José Retiz		
Sebastian Rozental		
Eric Vasquez		
Jonny Walker		

=== D.C. United ===
Exposed	Protected	Exempt
Jeff Carroll	Freddy Adu	
Stephen deRoux	Bobby Boswell	
Matías Donnet	Brian Carroll	
Rod Dyachenko	Facundo Erpen	
Ryan McIntosh	Alecko Eskandarian	
Devon McTavish	Christian Gomez	
Domenic Mediate	Joshua Gros	
Andy Metcalf	Jaime Moreno	
Justin Moose	Bryan Namoff	
Matt Nickell	Ben Olsen	
Brandon Prideaux	Troy Perkins	
Nick Rimando		
Clyde Simms		
Robert Ssejjemba		
David Stokes		
Jamil Walker		
John Wilson		

=== FC Dallas ===
Exposed	Protected	Exempt
Ray Burse	Arturo Alvarez	Dax McCarty
Jeff Cassar	Kenny Cooper	Blake Wagner
Michael Dello-Russo	Shaka Hislop	
Chris Gbandi	Drew Moor	
Clarence Goodson	Richard Mulrooney	
Roberto Mina	Ramón Núñez	
Justin Moore	Ronnie O'Brien	
Dominic Oduro	Carlos Ruiz	
Aaron Pitchkolan	Dario Sala	
Bobby Rhine	Marcelo Saragosa	
Alex Smith	Abe Thompson	
Simo Valakari		
Greg Vanney		
David Wagenfuhr		
Alex Yi		

=== Houston Dynamo ===
Exposed	Protected	Exempt
Chris Aloisi	Wade Barrett	Patrick Ianni
Mike Chabala	Brian Ching	
Kevin Goldthwaite	Ricardo Clark	
Kelly Gray	Ryan Cochrane	
Stuart Holden	Paul Dalglish	
Martin Hutton	Brad Davis	
Aaron Lanes	Dwayne De Rosario	
Mpho Moloi	Alejandro Moreno	
Julian Nash	Brian Mullan	
Adrian Serioux	Pat Onstad	
Marcus Storey	Eddie Robinson	
Craig Waibel		
Zach Wells		
Chris Wondolowski		

=== Kansas City Wizards ===
Exposed	Protected	Exempt
Matt Groenwald	Davy Arnaud	Will John
Will Hesmer	Jose Burciaga Jr.	Yura Movsisyan
Eric Kronberg	Jimmy Conrad	Ryan Pore
Ryan McMahen	Nick Garcia	
Bo Oshoniyi	Jack Jewsbury	
Sergei Raad	Eddie Johnson	
Ryan Raybould	Scott Sealy	
Brian Roberts	Shavar Thomas	
Stephen Shirley	Sasha Victorine	
Dave van den Bergh	Josh Wolff	
Tyson Wahl	Kerry Zavagnin	
Lance Watson		
Alex Zotinca		

=== Los Angeles Galaxy ===
Exposed	Protected	Exempt
Michael Enfield	Chris Albright	Steve Cronin
Josh Gardner	Landon Donovan	Quavas Kirk
Gavin Glinton	Cornell Glen	Nathan Sturgis
Guillermo Gonzalez	Herculez Gomez	
Alan Gordon	Kevin Hartman	
Josh Hansen	Ugo Ihemelu	
Cobi Jones	Ante Jazic	
Kyle Martino	Tyrone Marshall	
Stefani Miglioranzi	Santino Quaranta	
Paulo Nagamura	Troy Roberts	
Mike Randolph	Peter Vagenas	
Josh Saunders		
Kyle Veris		

=== New England Revolution ===
Exposed	Protected	Exempt
José Manuel Abundis	Clint Dempsey	Willie Sims
Kyle Brown	Andy Dorman	
José Cancela	Jay Heaps	
Joe Franchino	Shalrie Joseph	
Jani Galik	Tony Lochhead	
Miguel Gonzalez	Pat Noonan	
Pat Haggerty	Michael Parkhurst	
Daniel Hernández	Steve Ralston	
Avery John	Matt Reis	
Jeff Larentowicz	Khano Smith	
Marshall Leonard	Taylor Twellman	
Arsene Oka		
James Riley		
T.J. Tomasso		
Doug Warren		
Adam Williamson		
Danny Wynn		

=== New York Red Bulls ===
Exposed	Protected	Exempt
Michael Behonick	Jon Conway	Josmer Altidore
Edson Buddle	Todd Dunivant	David Arvizu
Blake Camp	Amado Guevara	
Peter Canero	Elie Ikangu	
Taylor Graham	Dema Kovalenko	
Chris Henderson	Mike Magee	
Steve Jolley	Carlos Mendes	
Shawn Kuykendall	Jeff Parke	
Jerrod Laventure	Markus Schopp	
Mark Lisi	Seth Stammler	
Tony Meola	Marvell Wynne	
Danny O'Rourke		
Joseph Vide		
John Wolyniec		

=== Real Salt Lake ===
Exposed	Protected	Exempt
Adam Acosta	Mehdi Ballouchy	Nikolas Besagno
Nelson Akwari	Jeff Cunningham	Christian Jimenez
Jacob Besagno	Willis Forko	Jamie Watson
Paul Broome	Atiba Harris	
Chris Brown	Chris Klein	
Kenny Cutler	Cameron Knowles	
Scott Garlick	Eddie Pope	
Brian Gil	Jafet Soto	
Chase Harrison	Jack Stewart	
Duke Hashimoto	Carey Talley	
Jason Kreis	Daniel Torres	
Jay Nolly		
Kevin Novak		
Douglas Sequeira		
Seth Trembly		
Andy Williams		
Joey Worthen		
