= 2006 Chivas USA season =

Chivas USA
2006 season
- Owner: Jorge Vergara
- Manager: Bob Bradley
- MLS: Conference: 3rd Overall: 6th
- MLS Cup Playoffs: Conference Semifinal vs Houston Dynamo
- U.S. Open Cup: Third round vs Dallas Roma
- Top goalscorer: League: Ante Razov (14); All: Ante Razov (15)
Home colors	Away colors

The 2006 Chivas USA season was the club's second season of existence, and their second in Major League Soccer, the top flight of American soccer. The club competed in the MLS's Western Conference, where they finished in third place, in their Conference, qualifying for the Playoffs for the first time.

== Season review ==
On November 23, 2005, Chivas appointed Bob Bradley as their new manager.

== Transfers ==
=== In ===
Date	Number	Position	Player	Previous club	Fee/notes	Ref
January 20, 2006	16	MF	(United States) Sacha Kljestan	Seton Hall Pirates	SuperDraft Round one	
January 20, 2006	13	MF	(United States) Jonathan Bornstein	UCLA Bruins	SuperDraft Round four	
January 24, 2006	11	MF	(United States) Jesse Marsch	Chicago Fire	Trade	
January 26, 2006	25	DF	(United States) Lawson Vaughn	Tulsa Golden Hurricane	Supplemental Draft Round three	
January 26, 2006	28	FW	(United States) Drew Helm	Florida Atlantic Owls	Supplemental Draft Round one	
January 26, 2006		MF	(United States) Darren Spicer	Princeton Tigers	Supplemental Draft Round two	
January 30, 2006	9	FW	(United States) Ante Razov	New York Red Bulls	Trade	
March 17, 2006	23	GK	(United States) Preston Burpo	Seattle Sounders		
March 17, 2006	29	FW	(United States) Estuardo Sanchez	Chivas USA U19	Promoted	
March 17, 2006	3	DF	(United States) Carlos Llamosa	New England Revolution		
March 17, 2006	4	FW	(United States) Brent Whitfield	Seattle Sounders		
March 31, 2006	24	DF	(United States) Tim Regan	New York Red Bulls		
July 19, 2006	30	MF	(United States) Carlos Borja	Chivas USA U19	Promoted	
Summer, 2006	11	MF	(United States) John O'Brien	(Netherlands) ADO Den Haag		
September 2006	27	DF	(United States) Eder Robles	Chivas USA U19	Promoted	
	2	DF	(Mexico) Claudio Suárez	(Mexico) Tigres UANL		
	8	DF	(Mexico) Johnny García	(Mexico) Guadalajara		
	21	DF	(United States) Jason Hernandez	New York Red Bulls		
	31	MF	(United States) Rene Corona	Corona Crew		

=== Out ===
Date	Number	Position	Player	New club	Fee/notes	Ref
January 30, 2006	99	FW	(Brazil) Thiago Martins	New York Red Bulls	Trade	
March 31, 2006	16	MF	(Mexico) Antonio Martínez		Waived	
April 1, 2006	27	DF	(Costa Rica) Douglas Sequeira	Real Salt Lake		
Mid 2006	8	MF	(United States) Francisco Gomez	Miami F.C.	Released	
	9	FW	(Mexico) Isaac Romo	(Mexico) Guadalajara	Loan return	
	59	GK	(Mexico) Sergio García	(Mexico) Guadalajara	Loan return	
	5	DF	(Saint Vincent and the Grenadines) Ezra Hendrickson	Columbus Crew		
	10	MF	(Mexico) Héctor Cuadros	(Mexico) Delfines		
	11	MF	(United States) Milton Blanco	Puerto Rico Islanders		
	17	MF	(United States) Christian Jimenez	Real Salt Lake		
	21	GK	(United States) Shaun Kalnasy	Atlanta Silverbacks		
	22	DF	(United States) Arturo Torres			
	23	DF	(Mexico) Armando Begines	(Mexico) Querétaro		
	26	MF	(Mexico) Jesús Ochoa			

== Roster ==
No.	Name	Nationality	Position	Date of birth (age)	Signed from	Signed in	Contract ends	Apps.	Goals
Goalkeepers
18	Brad Guzan	(United States)	GK	September 9, 1984 (aged 22)	Generation Adidas	2005			
23	Preston Burpo	(United States)	GK	September 26, 1972 (aged 34)	Seattle Sounders	2006			
Defenders
2	Claudio Suárez	(Mexico)	DF	December 17, 1968 (aged 37)	(Mexico) Tigres UANL	2006			
3	Carlos Llamosa	(United States)	DF	June 30, 1969 (aged 37)	New England Revolution	2006			
8	Johnny García	(Mexico)	DF	July 19, 1978 (aged 28)	(Mexico) Guadalajara	2006			
13	Jonathan Bornstein	(United States)	DF	November 7, 1984 (aged 21)	UCLA Bruin	2006			
14	Esteban Arias	(United States)	DF	August 26, 1982 (aged 24)	Connecticut Huskies	2005			
20	Orlando Perez	(United States)	DF	July 12, 1977 (aged 29)	Chicago Fire	2005			
21	Jason Hernandez	(United States)	DF	August 26, 1983 (aged 23)	New York Red Bulls	2006			
24	Tim Regan	(United States)	DF	June 27, 1981 (aged 25)	New York Red Bulls	2006			
25	Lawson Vaughn	(United States)	DF	April 11, 1984 (aged 22)	Tulsa Golden	2006			
27	Eder Robles	(United States)	DF	July 7, 1988 (aged 18)	Chivas USA Academy	2006			
Midfielders
4	Brent Whitfield	(United States)	MF	January 8, 1981 (aged 25)	Seattle Sounders	2006			
6	Francisco Mendoza	(Mexico)	MF	April 29, 1985 (aged 21)	(Mexico) Guadalajara	2005			
7	Ramón Ramírez	(Mexico)	MF	December 5, 1969 (aged 36)	(Mexico) Guadalajara	2005			
10	Juan Pablo García	(Mexico)	MF	November 24, 1981 (aged 24)	(Mexico) Atlas	2005			
11	John O'Brien	(United States)	MF	August 29, 1977 (aged 29)	(Netherlands) ADO Den Haag	2006			
12	Mike Muñoz	(United States)	MF	September 14, 1983 (aged 23)	California Golden Bears	2005			
15	Jesse Marsch	(United States)	MF	November 8, 1973 (aged 32)	Chicago Fire	2006			
16	Sacha Kljestan	(United States)	MF	September 9, 1985 (aged 21)	Seton Hall Pirates	2006			
30	Carlos Borja	(United States)	MF	January 18, 1988 (aged 18)	IMG Academy	2006			
31	Rene Corona	(United States)	MF	August 17, 1984 (aged 22)	Corona Crew	2006			
88	Rodrigo López	(United States)	MF	May 10, 1987 (aged 19)	(Mexico) Guadalajara	2005			
Forwards
9	Ante Razov	(United States)	FW	March 2, 1974 (aged 32)	New York Red Bulls	2006			
17	Francisco Palencia	(Mexico)	FW	April 28, 1973 (aged 33)	(Mexico) Guadalajara	2005			
19	Matt Taylor	(United States)	FW	October 17, 1981 (aged 25)	Kansas City Wizards	2005			
22	Jesús Morales	(Mexico)	FW	December 18, 1985 (aged 20)	loan from (Mexico) Guadalajara	2006	2006		
28	Drew Helm	(United States)	FW	November 9, 1984 (aged 21)	Florida Atlantic Owls	2006			
29	Estuardo Sanchez	(United States)	FW	January 16, 1988 (aged 18)		2006			

== Competitions ==
=== MLS ===
==== League table ====
Pos	Team	Pld	W	L	T	GF	GA	GD	Pts	Qualification
1	FC Dallas	32	16	12	4	48	44	+4	52	MLS Cup Playoffs
2	Houston Dynamo	32	11	8	13	44	40	+4	46	MLS Cup Playoffs
3	Chivas USA	32	10	9	13	45	42	+3	43	MLS Cup Playoffs
4	Colorado Rapids	32	11	13	8	36	49	−13	41	MLS Cup Playoffs
5	Los Angeles Galaxy	32	11	15	6	37	37	0	39	
6	Real Salt Lake	32	10	13	9	45	49	−4	39	

Source: MLS

==== Results summary ====
Overall								Home						Away					
Pld	Pts	W	L	T	GF	GA	GD	W	L	T	GF	GA	GD	W	L	T	GF	GA	GD
0	0	0	0	0	0	0	0	0	0	0	0	0	0	0	0	0	0	0	0

Last updated: October 16, 2005
Source: ESPNSoccernet.com
Pld = Matches played; Pts = Points; W = Matches won; T = Matches tied; L = Matches lost; GF = Goals for; GA = Goals against; GD = Goal difference

==== Results ====
April 2, 2006 1	Chivas USA	3–0	Real Salt Lake	Carson
13:00 PST	Razov 21', 65'; García 25'; Bornstein (yellow card) 40'	Report	Pope (yellow card) 17'	Stadium: The Home Depot Center

April 8, 2006 2	D.C. United	2–0	Chivas USA	Washington, D.C.
13:00 PST	Boswell (yellow card) 20'; Olsen (yellow card) 35'; Moreno 59', 90+1'	Report	Vaughn (yellow card) 4'; Marsch (yellow card) 45+1'; Razov (yellow card) 89'	Stadium: RFK Stadium

April 16, 2006 3	Chivas USA	1–2	LA Galaxy	Carson
17:00 PST	Mendoza (yellow card) 39'; Razov 46'; Regan (yellow card) 58'; García (yellow card) 60'; Marsch (yellow card) 90+6'	Report	Albright (yellow card) 37'; Glen 84', 90+3' (yellow card) 90+9'	Stadium: The Home Depot Center

April 29, 2006 4	Chivas USA	0–0	New York Red Bulls	Carson
16:00 PST	Razov (yellow card) 75'	Report		Stadium: The Home Depot Center

May 13, 2006 5	New England Revolution	3–1	Chivas USA	Foxborough
16:00 PST	Lochhead (yellow card) 22'; Dorman 23'; Joseph (yellow card) 43' (goal) 53'; Twellman (yellow card) 59' (goal) 86'	Report	Mendoza 19' (yellow card) 76'; Llamosa (yellow card) 39'; Razov (yellow card) 82'; García (yellow card) 90+3'	Stadium: Gillette Stadium

May 20, 2006 6	New York Red Bulls	5–4	Chivas USA	East Rutherford
16:30 PST		Report	Marsch (yellow card) 32'; Razov (yellow card) 51' (goal) 59', 77'; Palencia 64', 90+5' (pen.); Hernandez (yellow card) 64'	Stadium: Giants Stadium

May 28, 2006 7	Chivas USA	1–0	Chicago Fire	Carson
17:00 PST	García 2'; Marsch (yellow card) 56'; Regan (yellow card) 76'; Bornstein (yellow card) 90+3'	Report	Griffin (yellow card) 45'	Stadium: The Home Depot Center

June 3, 2006 8	Chivas USA	4–1	Colorado Rapids	Carson
16:00 PST	Petke 6' (o.g.); Razov 24'; Mendoza 76'; Llamosa (yellow card) 83'; Palencia 85'	Report	Dayan 31'; Coundoul (yellow card) 85'; Hernández (yellow card) 88'	Stadium: The Home Depot Center

June 8, 2006 9	LA Galaxy	1–2	Chivas USA	Carson
16:00 PST	Gomez 27'; Ihemelu (yellow card) 70'	Report	Razov 15', 21'; Bornstein (yellow card) 41'; Regan (yellow card) 44'; Vaughn (yellow card) 52'	Stadium: The Home Depot Center

June 11, 2006 10	FC Dallas	2–1	Chivas USA	Dallas
14:00 PST	Ruiz 28'; Miña (yellow card) 66' (goal) 82'	Report	Vaughn (yellow card) 14'; Llamosa (yellow card) 73'; Razov 83'	Stadium: Cotton Bowl

June 18, 2006 11	Chivas USA	2–0	Columbus Crew	Carson
16:00 PST	Razov 5'; Hernandez (yellow card) 45'; García 85'	Report	Kotschau (yellow card) 34'	Stadium: The Home Depot Center

June 21, 2006 12	Colorado Rapids	1–1	Chivas USA	Denver
16:30 PST	Dayan 58'; Kirovski (yellow card) 70'	Report	García 10' (yellow card) 77'; Llamosa (yellow card) 31'	Stadium: Invesco Field at Mile High

June 24, 2006 13	Columbus Crew	1–1	Chivas USA	Columbus
16:30 PST	Retiz 12'; González (yellow card) 33'; Kotschau (yellow card) 43'	Report	Kljestan (yellow card) 26'; Razov (yellow card) 37'; Regan (yellow card) 41'; García 54'	Stadium: Crew Stadium

June 28, 2006 14	Chivas USA	1–1	Houston Dynamo	Carson
16:30 PST	Llamosa (yellow card) 32'; Marsch 75'; Hernandez (yellow card) 90+1'	Report	De Rosario 55'	Stadium: The Home Depot Center

July 1, 2006 15	Chivas USA	3–0	FC Dallas	Carson
16:00 PST	Suárez 20', 24'; Bornstein 43'; Perez (yellow card) 45'	Report		Stadium: The Home Depot Center

July 5, 2006 16	Real Salt Lake	0–0	Chivas USA	Salt Lake City
17:00 PST	Cunningham (yellow card) 86'	Report		Stadium: Rice-Eccles Stadium

July 8, 2006 17	Houston Dynamo	3–1	Chivas USA	Houston
13:00 PST	Ching 19'; Waibel (yellow card) 60'; Mullan 64'; Moreno 84'	Report	Razov 8'; Kljestan (yellow card) 66'; Mendoza (yellow card) 68'	Stadium: Robertson Stadium

July 15, 2006 18	Chivas USA	0–0	LA Galaxy	Carson
14:00 PST	Razov (yellow card) 25'; Marsch (yellow card) 29'	Report	Marshall (yellow card) 43'; Albright (yellow card) 53'; Roberts (yellow card) 84'	Stadium: The Home Depot Center

July 21, 2006 19	Colorado Rapids	3–3	Chivas USA	Denver
17:00 PST	Dayan 10'; Petke (yellow card) 31' (yellow-red card) 68'; Mastroeni (yellow card) 62'; Mathis 64'; Martins (yellow card) 80'; Gargan (yellow card) 88'; Peterson 90+3'	Report	Palencia 9'; Bornstein 74', 90+1'	Stadium: Invesco Field at Mile High

July 26, 2006 20	Real Salt Lake	3–3	Chivas USA	Salt Lake City
16:00 PST	, Cunningham 33'; Talley 55'; Novak (yellow card) 63'; Williams 74'	Report	Razov 2'; Bornstein 59'; Kljestan (yellow card) 81'; Suárez 90+4'	Stadium: Rice-Eccles Stadium

August 6, 2006 21	Chivas USA	1–1	New England Revolution	Los Angeles
15:30 PST	Marsch 22'	Report	Twellman 16'	Stadium: Los Angeles Memorial Coliseum; Attendance: 92,650

August 12, 2006 22	Chicago Fire	1–2	Chivas USA	Chicago
16:30 PST	Rolfe 82'	Report	García 77'; Suárez 90+1' (pen.)	Stadium: Toyota Park

August 19, 2006 23	Chivas USA	1–1	Kansas City Wizards	Carson
16:00 PST	Mendoza (yellow card) 38'; García (yellow card) 48'; Bornstein 83'; Perez (yellow card) 86'	Report	Burciaga 42'; Watson (yellow card) 76'	Stadium: The Home Depot Center

August 27, 2006 24	Chivas USA	3–2	Houston Dynamo	Carson
17:00 PST	Bornstein 8'; Razov 45', 57'; Arias (yellow card) 84'	Report	De Rosario 28' (pen.), 67'; Clark (red card) 31'	Stadium: The Home Depot Center

September 3, 2006 25	Chivas USA	1–2	D.C. United	Carson
13:00 PST	Suárez 32' (pen.); Hernandez (yellow card) 90+2'; Mendoza (yellow card) 90+3'	Report	Gómez 3', 33' (yellow card) 30'; Boswell (yellow card) 18'; Eskandarian (yellow card) 23'; Carroll (yellow card) 75'	Stadium: The Home Depot Center

September 9, 2006 26	Chivas USA	1–1	FC Dallas	Carson
16:00 PST	García 81'	Report	Cooper 55' (yellow card) 55'; Gbandi (yellow card) 72'	Stadium: The Home Depot Center

September 13, 2006 27	FC Dallas	0–1	Chivas USA	Dallas
16:30 PST	Valakari (yellow card) 45'	Report	García 13'; Llamosa (yellow card) 59'; Morales (yellow card) 72' (yellow-red card) 76'	Stadium: Cotton Bowl

September 17, 2006 28	Houston Dynamo	0–0	Chivas USA	Houston
16:30 PST	Dalglish (yellow card) 47'; Gray (yellow card) 57'	Report	Suárez (yellow card) 23'; Regan (yellow card) 33' (yellow-red card) 59'	Stadium: Robertson Stadium

September 23, 2006 29	Chivas USA	1–0	Colorado Rapids	Carson
16:00 PST	Mendoza 34'	Report		Stadium: The Home Depot Center

September 30, 2006 30	LA Galaxy	3–0	Chivas USA	Carson
16:30 PST	Vagenas 29'; Quaranta (yellow card) 39'; Donovan 67'; Gordon 80'	Report	Morales (yellow card) 25'; Marsch (yellow card) 40'	Stadium: The Home Depot Center

October 7, 2006 31	Kansas City Wizards	2–1	Chivas USA	Kansas City
16:30 PST	van den Bergh 50'; Victorine (yellow card) 58'; Burciaga 74' (pen.); Movsisyan (yellow card) 90'	Report	Kljestan (yellow card) 49'; Suárez 71' (pen.)	Stadium: Arrowhead Stadium

October 15, 2006 32	Chivas USA	1–1	Real Salt Lake	Carson
13:00 PST	Whitfield 20'	Report	Soto (yellow card) 89'	Stadium: The Home Depot Center

=== MLS Cup Playoffs ===
October 22, 2006 Conference Semifinal 1st leg	Chivas USA	2–1	Houston Dynamo	Carson
10:00 PST	Mendoza (yellow card) 38'; Razov 45'; Palencia 68'	Report	De Rosario (yellow card) 37'; Onstad (yellow card) 45+1'; Ching 75'	Stadium: The Home Depot Center

October 29, 2006 Conference Semifinal 2nd leg	Houston Dynamo	2–0 (3–2 agg.)	Chivas USA	Houston
12:00 PST	Clark (yellow card) 59'; Davis 64' (pen.); Serioux (yellow card) 67'; Ching 90+2'	Report	Vaughn (yellow card) 55'; Palencia (yellow card) 57' (yellow-red card) 58'; Regan (yellow card) 63'; García (yellow card) 64'	Stadium: Robertson Stadium

=== U.S. Open Cup ===
July 12, 2006 Third round	Dallas Roma	0–0 (a.e.t.) (4–2 p)	Chivas USA	Santa Barbara
21:00 PST		Report	Razov (red card) 57'	Stadium: Harder Stadium; Attendance: 2,127; Referee: Baldomero Toledo
	Penalties
	M.Clark (penalty scored); M.Rowland (penalty scored); B.Flanagan (penalty scored); Schell (penalty scored)		Palencia (penalty missed); Kljestan (penalty scored); Marsch (penalty missed); Suárez (penalty scored)

== Statistics ==
As of Match played October 29, 2006

=== Appearances and goals ===
No.	Pos	Nat	Player	Total		MLS		Playoffs		U.S. Open Cup	
No.	Pos	Nat	Player	Apps	Goals	Apps	Goals	Apps	Goals	Apps	Goals
2	DF	(Mexico) MEX	Claudio Suárez	2	0	0	0	2	0	0	0
6	MF	(Mexico) MEX	Francisco Mendoza	2	0	0	0	2	0	0	0
9	FW	(United States) USA	Ante Razov	1	1	0	0	1	1	0	0
10	MF	(Mexico) MEX	Juan Pablo García	2	0	0	0	2	0	0	0
13	DF	(United States) USA	Jonathan Bornstein	2	0	0	0	2	0	0	0
15	MF	(United States) USA	Jesse Marsch	2	0	0	0	2	0	0	0
16	MF	(United States) USA	Sacha Kljestan	2	0	0	0	1+1	0	0	0
17	FW	(Mexico) MEX	Francisco Palencia	2	1	0	0	2	1	0	0
18	GK	(United States) USA	Brad Guzan	2	0	0	0	2	0	0	0
21	DF	(United States) USA	Jason Hernandez	2	0	0	0	2	0	0	0
22	FW	(Mexico) MEX	Jesús Morales	1	0	0	0	0+1	0	0	0
24	DF	(United States) USA	Tim Regan	2	0	0	0	2	0	0	0
25	DF	(United States) USA	Lawson Vaughn	2	0	0	0	2	0	0	0
Players away from Chivas USA on loan:
Players who left Chivas USA during the season:

=== Goal scorers ===
Place	Position	Nation	Number	Name	MLS	MLS Cup Playoffs	U.S. Open Cup	Total
1	FW	(United States)	9	Ante Razov	14	1	0	15
2	MF	(Mexico)	10	Juan Pablo García	8	0	0	8
3	DF	(United States)	13	Jonathan Bornstein	6	0	0	6
3	DF	(Mexico)	2	Claudio Suárez	6	0	0	6
5	FW	(Mexico)	17	Francisco Palencia	4	1	0	5
6	MF	(Mexico)	6	Francisco Mendoza	3	0	0	3
7	MF	(United States)	15	Jesse Marsch	2	0	0	2
8	MF	(United States)	4	Brent Whitfield	1	0	0	1
8				Own goal	1	0	0	1
				TOTALS	45	2	0	47

=== Disciplinary record ===
Number	Nation	Position	Name	MLS		MLS Cup Playoffs		U.S. Open Cup		Total	
Number	Nation	Position	Name	Booked	Sent off (straight red)	Booked	Sent off (straight red)	Booked	Sent off (straight red)	Booked	Sent off (straight red)
2	(Mexico)	DF	Claudio Suárez	1	0	0	0	0	0	1	0
3	(United States)	DF	Carlos Llamosa	6	0	0	0	0	0	6	0
6	(Mexico)	MF	Francisco Mendoza	5	0	1	0	0	0	6	0
9	(United States)	FW	Ante Razov	5	0	0	0	0	1	5	1
10	(Mexico)	MF	Juan Pablo García	4	0	1	0	0	0	5	0
13	(United States)	DF	Jonathan Bornstein	3	0	0	0	0	0	3	0
14	(United States)	DF	Esteban Arias	1	0	0	0	0	0	1	0
15	(United States)	MF	Jesse Marsch	6	0	0	0	0	0	6	0
16	(United States)	MF	Sacha Kljestan	4	0	0	0	0	0	4	0
17	(Mexico)	FW	Francisco Palencia	0	0	2	1	0	0	2	1
20	(United States)	DF	Orlando Perez	2	0	0	0	0	0	2	0
21	(United States)	DF	Jason Hernandez	4	0	0	0	0	0	4	0
22	(Mexico)	FW	Jesús Morales	3	1	0	0	0	0	3	1
24	(United States)	DF	Tim Regan	6	1	1	0	0	0	7	1
25	(United States)	DF	Lawson Vaughn	3	0	1	0	0	0	4	0
			TOTALS	50	2	6	1	0	1	56	4
