= Russolillo =

Russolillo is a surname. Notable people with the surname include:

- Carlo Russolillo (1957–2026), Italian boxer
- Giustino Russolillo (1891–1955), Italian Catholic priest
- Jordan Russolillo (born 1984), American soccer player
