= Chris Lancos =

American soccer player (born 1984)

Personal information
- Full name: Christopher Joseph Lancos
- Date of birth: July 12, 1984 (age 42)
- Place of birth: Glen Dale, West Virginia, U.S.
- Height: 6 ft 1 in (1.85 m)
- Position: Defender

Youth career
- 2002–2005: Maryland

Senior career*
Years	Team	Apps	(Gls)
2006	1. FC Kaiserslautern II	21	(0)
2007	Real Salt Lake	14	(0)

International career^{‡}
2001	United States U-17	2	(0)
- * Club domestic league appearances and goals as of 21 July 2010 ‡ National team caps and goals as of 18 May 2007

Christopher J. Lancos (born July 12, 1984) is an American soccer defender who last played for Real Salt Lake of Major League Soccer.

Lancos played collegiate soccer at the University of Maryland, College Park, where he made 93 appearances for the Terrapins from 2002 to 2005, scoring 7 goals and 18 assists. He was a starting member of Maryland's 2005 College Cup championship team.

He was selected in the fourth round, 41st overall by Real Salt Lake in the 2006 MLS Supplemental Draft, but opted instead to sign with the youth team of Germany's 1. FC Kaiserslautern. He was allowed to terminate his contract early in January 2007, after about a year with the German side. He subsequently signed with Real Salt Lake for the 2007 MLS season.

Lancos spent time in the U.S. Residency Program in Bradenton, Florida during 2000 and 2001. He has been capped numerous times for the United States national youth teams, and was a member of the squad during the 2001 FIFA U-17 World Championship.

Chris Lancos is a current member of SAM.
