= Paulo Nagamura =

Brazilian footballer (born 1983)

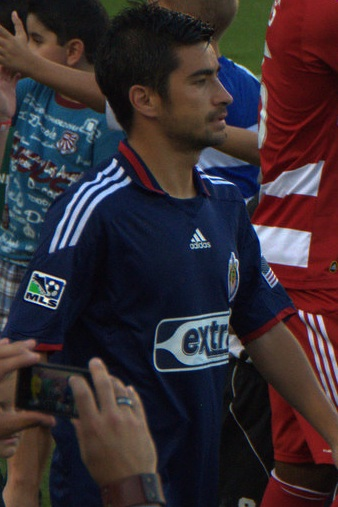
- Nagamura in 2010

Personal information
- Full name: Paulo Roberto Corradi Nagamura
- Date of birth: March 2, 1983 (age 43)
- Place of birth: São Paulo, Brazil
- Height: 5 ft 8 in (1.73 m)
- Position: Midfielder

Youth career
- 1994–2001: São Paulo
- 2001–2004: Arsenal

Senior career*
Years	Team	Apps	(Gls)
2005–2006	Los Angeles Galaxy	54	(0)
2007	Toronto FC	4	(0)
2007–2009	Chivas USA	73	(8)
2010	Tigres	14	(0)
2010–2011	Chivas USA	26	(1)
2012–2016	Sporting Kansas City	95	(6)
2016	→ Swope Park Rangers (loan)	1	(0)
Total		267	(15)

Managerial career
- 2017: Swope Park Rangers (assistant)
- 2018–2021: Sporting Kansas City II
- 2022: Houston Dynamo
- 2024: Chicago Fire (assistant)
- 2026–: Tacoma Defiance
- * Club domestic league appearances and goals

Paulo Roberto Corradi Nagamura (Portuguese pronunciation: [ˈpawlu naɡaˈmuɾɐ]; born March 2, 1983) is a Brazilian former professional football player and coach. He spent most of his playing career in MLS, where he won two MLS Cups and three U.S. Open Cups.

== Career ==
=== Youth ===
Born in São Paulo, Nagamura came up through the system of hometown club São Paulo. In 2001, he was sold to English powerhouse Arsenal, and played with the club's youth and reserve sides through 2004, helping them to the English U-19 championship, scoring a goal in the final against Liverpool. He also scored in a pre-season friendly for Arsenal against Stevenage in 2002.

=== Professional ===
==== Los Angeles Galaxy ====
On March 22, 2005, Nagamura signed with the Los Angeles Galaxy of Major League Soccer. He made his Galaxy and MLS debut on April 2, playing the full 90 minutes in a 3–0 loss to the Columbus Crew. Nagamura ended the regular season with 25 appearances, 24 of them starts, and 2 assists, helping the Galaxy finish 4th in the Western Conference and qualify for the playoffs. He started all 4 of the Galaxy's playoff games, helping Los Angeles reach MLS Cup 2005, where they defeated the New England Revolution 1–0. Nagamura also helped the Galaxy win the 2005 U.S. Open Cup, making 3 appearances during the tournament, although he did not appear in the final, a 1–0 win over FC Dallas.

In the 2006 season, Nagamura made 29 appearances and had 4 assists during the regular season as the Galaxy finished 5th in the West, failing to qualify for the playoffs. He also played 3 times in the Open Cup, helping LA reach the final, where Nagamura and the Galaxy fell 1–0 to the Chicago Fire.

==== Toronto FC ====
On November 17, 2006, Nagamura was selected by Toronto FC in the 2006 MLS Expansion Draft. He made his TFC debut on April 7, 2007, the first game in club history, in a 2–0 loss to Chivas USA. He made 4 appearances for Toronto prior to being traded.

==== Chivas USA ====
On May 4, 2007, Nagamura was traded to Chivas USA in exchange for a first-round pick in the 2008 MLS SuperDraft. He made his debut for the Chivas USA on May 6, playing the full 90 in a 2–1 loss to D.C. United. On June 9 he scored his first goal for Chivas USA to give the Goats a 1–0 win over the Chicago Fire. Nagamura ended the regular season with 2 goals and 2 assists in 22 appearances, helping Chivas finish 1st in the Western Conference. Nagamura played in both of Chivas's playoff games, losing in the Conference Semifinals 1–0 to the Kansas City Wizards on aggregate.

On April 12, Nagamura picked up his first goal and assist of the 2008 season in a 4–3 loss to the Columbus Crew. On August 14, he scored and had an assist against the LA Galaxy to help Chivas draw 2–2 against his former club. Nagamura made 24 appearances, scored 2 goals, and had 3 assists in regular season play, helping Chivas finish 2nd in the West. He played in both of Chivas's playoff games, with the Goats losing 3–2 on aggregate to Real Salt Lake in the Conference Semifinals. The 2008 season also saw Nagamura play once in the Open Cup, twice in the CONCACAF Champions League, and twice in the North American SuperLiga.

In the opening match of the 2009 season, Nagamura scored twice to give Chivas a 2–1 win over the Colorado Rapids. Chivas qualified for the playoffs again in 2009, finishing 4th in the conference, with Nagamura making 27 appearances, scoring 4 goals, and recording 2 assists in regular season play. Once again, Nagamura and Chivas would not advance past the first round, losing to the Galaxy 3–2 on aggregate in the Conference Semifinals. He also played in all 3 of Chivas's games in the SuperLiga group stage, with the Goats finishing bottom of the group. His contract with Chivas expired after the 2009 season.

==== Tigres UANL ====
In January 2010, Nagamura signed with Mexican Primera División club Tigres UANL. On January 23, he made his debut for Tigres, coming off the bench in a 3–1 loss to C.D. Guadalajara. Nagamura appeared in 14 of Tigres's 17 games in the Clausura season, making 11 starts. Tigres failed to qualify for the Liguilla playoffs.

==== Return to Chivas USA ====
On June 25, 2010, Nagamura signed with Chivas USA for a second stint. He made his first appearance of the 2010 MLS season on July 24 in a 1–1 draw to Real Salt Lake. he scored his first goal of his 2nd stint with Chivas on September 10, helping Chivas beat the New England Revolution 2–0. Nagamura made 15 appearances and scored 1 goal in the regular season as Chivas finished 8th in the Western Conference, missing out on the playoffs.

Nagamura missed the first 4 games of the 2011 season after he injured his calf in preseason. He made his season debut on April 16, coming off the bench in a 0–0 draw with the Vancouver Whitecaps FC. He aggravated his calf injury during the game and missed the following 6 matches. On August 24 Nagamura was subbed off after breaking his foot in a 1–0 loss to the Portland Timbers. He missed the final 8 games of the season. He ended the season with just 11 appearances, 6 of them starts, and 1 assist as Chivas finished 8th in the West and missed the playoffs again.

==== Sporting Kansas City ====
On November 29, 2011, Nagamura was traded to Sporting Kansas City for a 2012 MLS Supplemental Draft pick. He missed the first game of the 2012 season due to a calf injury. On March 17, 2012, Nagamura made his SKC debut, coming off the bench in a 3–0 win against the New England Revolution. He scored his first goal for Kansas City on May 29 in a 3–2 win against Orlando City in the U.S. Open Cup 3rd round. In June, Nagamura had a groin injury that caused him to miss 4 MLS and 2 Open Cup games. On August 8, Nagamura played 120 minutes as Sporting beat the Philadelphia Union 3–2 on penalties in the Open Cup Final, with Nagamura converting the winning PK. He ended the regular season with 27 appearances, 1 goal, and 1 assist, helping SKC finish 1st in the Eastern Conference. He missed both of Kansas City's playoff games after hurting his ankle in the regular season finale. SKC lost 2–1 on aggregate to the Houston Dynamo in his absence.

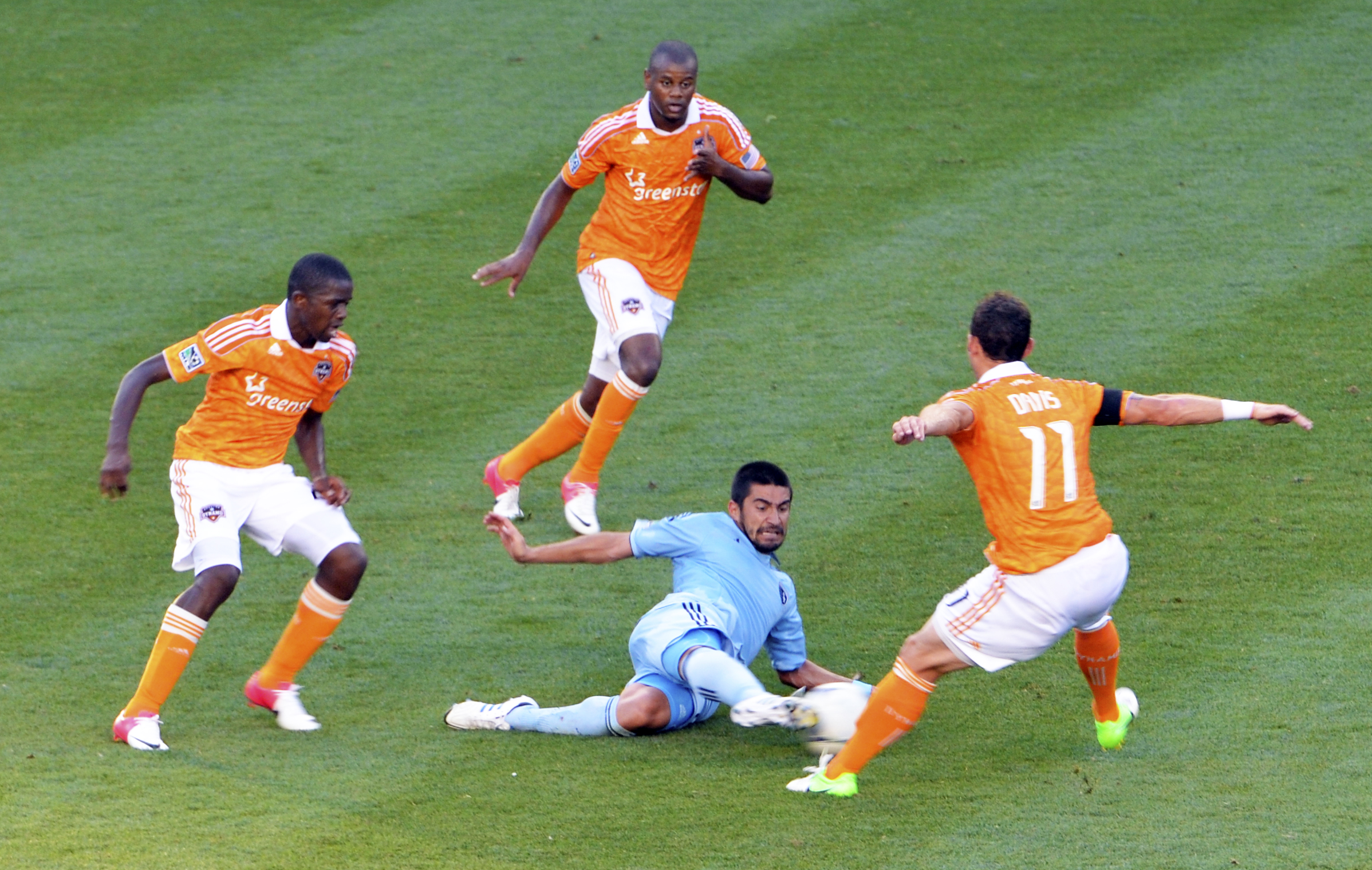
Paulo Nagamura, in blue, defends against three Houston Dynamo players at Livestrong Sporting Park on July 7, 2012

After starting 15 of Kansas City's first 16 MLS games of the 2013 season, Nagamura played just twice over the final 18 games due to an ankle injury. He ended the regular season with 17 appearances and 1 assist as Sporting finished 2nd in the East. Nagamura missed the first leg of the Conference Semifinals because of his ankle injury, but returned for the second leg, playing 97 minutes to help SKC defeat New England 3–1 in extra time, advancing 4–2 on aggregate. He played the full match in both legs of the Conference Finals as Sporting beat Houston 2–1 on aggregate. In MLS Cup 2013, Nagamura played 120 minutes and converted his penalty kick to help SKC defeat Real Salt Lake 7–6 on penalties, giving the club its first league title since 2000. He also played once in the Open Cup and made one appearance in the CONCACAF Champions League group stage, helping Kansas City top their group.

Having missed the first 2 MLS games of the 2014 season due to an injury, Nagamura made his first appearance of the season on March 12 in leg 1 of the CCL quarterfinals, a 1–0 win vs Cruz Azul. Seven days later, Nagamura and SKC lost the second leg 5–1. On July 6, he hurt his ankle in a 1–1 draw with the Chicago Fire that kept him out for 2 months. Nagamura ended the regular season with 21 appearances, 2 goals, and 3 assists, helping Kansas City finish 5th in the Eastern Conference. He played the full 90 minutes in SKC's one playoff game, a 2–1 loss to the New York Red Bulls. He also played twice in the 2014–15 CCL group stage, with SKC failing to advance from their group.

2015 saw Nagamura deal with a back injury that limited his involvement in the first half of the season, keeping him out for all of June. On August 15, Nagamura scored in the 87th and 94th minute to give SKC a 4–3 win over Vancouver Whitecaps FC, a performance that saw him named MLS Player of the Week. Kansas City finished the regular season in the 6th and final playoff spot in the Western Conference, with Nagamura contributing 3 goals and 1 assist in 21 regular season appearances. In their first playoff game, Nagamura played the full 120 minutes as Sporting and the Portland Timbers played to a 2–2 draw before Portland advanced on penalties 7–6, with Nagamura converting his PK in the shootout. Kansas City had better luck in the 2015 U.S. Open Cup Final, beating the Philadelphia Union 8–7 on penalties, with Nagamura playing the full 120 minutes and converting his penalty kick to help SKC win their third ever Open Cup.

After missing the first 12 games of the 2016 season due to a calf injury, Nagamura made his first appearance of the year on May 15, coming off the bench in a 1–0 win over Orlando City SC. He suffered a quad strain in June that kept him out for 2 months. SKC qualified for the playoffs after finishing 5th in the West, but Nagamura was limited to just 9 appearances and 1 assist in the regular season due to injuries. He would play the full 90 minutes in Kansas City's one playoff game, a 1–0 loss to Seattle Sounders FC in the opening round. The 2016 season also saw Nagamura play 3 times in the 2016–17 CCL group stage, with SKC failing to advance out of their group, as well as make an appearance for KC's USL affiliate club, Swope Park Rangers.

On December 12, 2016, Nagamura announced his retirement.

== Coaching ==
=== Swope Park Rangers/Sporting Kansas City II ===
After retiring from playing following the 2016 season, Nagamura became an assistant coach for SKC's USL affiliate club, Swope Park Rangers.

On December 4, 2017, Nagamura was promoted to head coach for Swope Park. In his first season as a head coach, Nagamura led Swope Park to the playoffs. They would not return to the playoffs in the other 3 years of his tenure. Prior to the 2020 season, Swope Park rebranded as Sporting Kansas City II.

Nagamura left SKC II following the 2021 season.

=== Houston Dynamo ===
On January 3, 2022, Nagamura was named head coach for the Houston Dynamo. His tenure as Dynamo coach only lasted 29 matches, as he was fired on September 5.

=== Chicago Fire ===
On January 19, 2024, Nagamura was named as an assistant coach for the Chicago Fire.

=== Tacoma Defiance ===
Nagamura was named the head coach of the Tacoma Defiance, the reserve team of Seattle Sounders FC, on February 3, 2026.

== Personal life ==
Nagamura holds a U.S. green card which qualifies him as a domestic player for MLS roster purposes. Born in Brazil, he is of Japanese and Italian descent.

== Career statistics ==
Appearances and goals by club, season and competition
Club	Season	League			National cup (Note: Includes U.S. Open Cup)		League cup (Note: Includes MLS Cup Playoffs)		Continental		Total	
Club	Season	Division	Apps	Goals	Apps	Goals	Apps	Goals	Apps	Goals	Apps	Goals
Los Angeles Galaxy	2005	MLS	25	0	3	0	4	0	—		32	0
Los Angeles Galaxy	2006	MLS	29	0	3	0	—		0	0	32	0
Los Angeles Galaxy	Total		54	0	6	0	4	0	0	0	64	0
Toronto FC	2007	MLS	4	0	—		—		—		4	0
Chivas USA	2007	MLS	22	2	0	0	2	0	—		24	2
Chivas USA	2008	MLS	24	2	1	0	2	0	4 (Note: Two appearances in CONCACAF Champions League, two appearances in North American SuperLiga)	0	31	2
Chivas USA	2009	MLS	27	4	1	0	2	0	3 (Note: Appearances in North American SuperLiga)	0	33	4
Chivas USA	Total		73	8	2	0	6	0	7	0	88	8
Tigres UANL	2009–10	Primera División	14	0	—		—		—		14	0
Chivas USA	2010	MLS	15	1	1	0	—		1	0	17	1
Chivas USA	2011	MLS	11	0	0	0	—		—		11	0
Chivas USA	Total		26	1	1	0	0	0	1	0	28	1
Sporting Kansas City	2012	MLS	27	1	3	1	0	0	—		30	2
Sporting Kansas City	2013	MLS	17	0	1	0	4	0	1 (Note: Appearances in CONCACAF Champions League)	0	23	0
Sporting Kansas City	2014	MLS	21	2	2	0	1	0	4	0	28	2
Sporting Kansas City	2015	MLS	21	3	3	0	1	0	—		25	3
Sporting Kansas City	2016	MLS	9	0	0	0	1	0	3	0	13	0
Sporting Kansas City	Total		95	6	9	1	7	0	8	0	119	7
Swope Park Rangers (loan)	2016	USL	1	0	—		0	0	—		1	0
Career total			267	15	18	1	17	0	16	0	318	16

== Managerial statistics ==
As of match played September 4, 2022

Managerial record by team and tenure
Team	Nat	From	To	Record (Note: regular season only)							
Team	Nat	From	To	G	W	D	L	GF	GA	GD	Win %
Sporting Kansas City II	(United States)	December 4, 2017	November 18, 2021	116	30	25	61	152	227	−75	25.86
Houston Dynamo	(United States)	January 3, 2022	September 5, 2022	29	8	5	16	36	48	−12	27.59
Total				145	38	30	77	188	275	−87	26.21

== Honors ==
Arsenal

- Premier League U-19 championship: 2001

Los Angeles Galaxy

- Lamar Hunt U.S. Open Cup: 2005
- MLS Cup: 2005

Sporting Kansas City

- Lamar Hunt U.S. Open Cup: 2012, 2015
- MLS Cup: 2013
