= Trevor McEachron =

American soccer player

Personal information
- Date of birth: August 4, 1983 (age 43)
- Place of birth: Woodbridge, Virginia, United States
- Height: 6 ft 2 in (1.88 m)
- Position: Forward

Youth career
- 2001–2005: Old Dominion University

Senior career*
| Years | Team | Apps | (Gls) |
| 2001–2003 | Chesapeake Dragons | 38 | (1) |
| 2006–2008 | Richmond Kickers | 69 | (3) |
- * Club domestic league appearances and goals as of August 23, 2008

Trevor McEachron (born August 4, 1983, in Woodbridge, Virginia) is an American soccer forward with the Richmond Kickers in the USL Second Division. He was a 2003 first team All American and spent three seasons in the Premier Development League. His father is Earl McEachron and his mother is Barbara Sheehan. Trevor has an older brother and younger sister. He received his bachelor's degree in business management from Old Dominion University.

== Youth ==
McEachron grew up in Virginia where he attended Woodbridge High School. He completed school his junior year and used his senior year to play soccer. In the spring of 2001, he joined the Chesapeake Dragons of the fourth division Premier Development League. He would continue to play for the Dragons through the 2003 collegiate off season. In the fall of 2001, McEachron entered Old Dominion University, playing on the men's soccer team from 2001 to 2005. He was the team's MVP his freshman season. In 2003, he had played seventeen games before suffering a season ending knee injury which kept him out of the 2004 season. Despite the injury, he was named a 2003 first team All American. He returned for the 2005 season, earning first team all CAA recognition.

== College Accomplishments ==
Career: 2005: After 7 surgeries on his right knee because of an ACL, LCL, and PCL tear, he returned to action for ODU and earned All-Conference honors... 2004: Did not see action due to knee injury...2003: Had career-breaking year for the Monarchs, starting in 17 before season-ending knee injury in game against George Mason...Named National Player of the Week by College Soccer News for week ending September 14...Named CAA Player of the Week two weeks in a row (September 15 and 22)... Set career-high in goals (4) and points (8)... Vital part of the ODU defense that went through first nine games of the season without allowing a goal and 14 total shutouts...Named to the NSCAA All-American First Team, All-CAA First Team, VaSID All-State First Team and College Soccer News All-American First Team...2003 CAA Defender of the Year...2002: Established himself as one of the toughest and quickest defenders in the league... Selected to All-Region, All-State and All-CAA teams... Started 20 of the team's 20 games... Played with the U-23 Jamaica National Team during the summer... Scored his first career goal to defeat Ga. State in the first game of the 2002 ODU Stihl Classic... Helped the ODU backfield hold opponents to one goal or less nine times... 2001: Named an Honorable Mention Freshman All-American... Earned second team All-CAA honors as a freshman in 2001...Named team MVP last year starting in all 17 contests... Tallied one assist.

== Professional ==
On January 26, 2006, the Los Angeles Galaxy selected McEachron in the first round (twelfth overall) of the 2006 MLS Supplemental Draft. At some point in 2006, he signed with the Richmond Kickers, and earned a starting position three games into the season. McEachron spent three seasons with the Kickers, solidifying the defense and helping the Kickers win the USL Championship in 2006 and reach the USL Championship in 2007, where they lost in penalties. McEachron earned All-League honors in his second and third seasons, including making the USL Team of the Week twice. He also spent time with the D.C. United and Chicago Fire reserves on loan from the Kickers reserves in 2006, 2007, and 2008. It appears he may have spent part of the 2008 season with the Los Angeles Galaxy because he did not sign with the Kickers until June 5, 2008. On August 22, 2008, he played on loan with the Chicago Fire in Chicago's exhibition match with C.D. Veracruz
