= 2006 MLS supplemental draft =

College draft for soccer teams

In Major League Soccer in the United States and Canada, the 2006 MLS supplemental draft, held on January 26, 2006, followed the 2006 MLS SuperDraft, as teams filled out their developmental rosters.

== Round 1 ==
Pick #	MLS team	Player	Position	Affiliation
1	Chivas USA	(United States) Drew Helm	F	Florida Atlantic
2	Real Salt Lake	(United States) Jeff Rowland	F	New Mexico
3	Columbus Crew	(United States) Andy Gruenebaum	GK	Kentucky
4	Kansas City Wizards	(United States) Anthony Noriega	D	George Mason
5	MetroStars	(United States) Joe Vide	M	Virginia
6	FC Dallas	(United States) Christopher Joyce	F	Franklin Pierce
7	Houston 1836 (Note: #7: D.C. United → Houston 1836. 27 May 2005: Houston 1836, at the time still based in San Jose as the Earthquakes, acquired this first-round selection from D.C. United in exchange for the #1 draft slot in the MLS waiver rankings. The clubs also agreed to switch waiver slots for the remainder of the 2005 Major League Soccer season. D.C. immediately used the #1 slot to sign defender John Wilson.)	(South Africa) Mpho Moloi	M	Connecticut
8	FC Dallas (Note: #8: Houston 1836 → FC Dallas. 25 March 2005: FC Dallas acquired this first-round selection from Houston 1836, at the time still based in San Jose as the Earthquakes, in exchange for forward Julian Nash.)	(United States) Miguel Guante	D	Portland
9	Colorado Rapids	(United States) Jordan Harvey	D	UCLA
10	Chicago Fire	(United States) Floyd Franks	M	Charlotte
11	New England Revolution	(United States) Danny Wynn	M	Saint Louis
12	Los Angeles Galaxy	(United States) Trevor McEachron	D	Old Dominion

== Round 2 ==
Pick #	MLS team	Player	Position	Affiliation
13	Chivas USA	(United States) Darren Spicer	D	Princeton
14	Real Salt Lake	(Liberia) Willis Forko	D	Connecticut
15	Columbus Crew	(United States) David Chun	M	Southern Methodist
16	Kansas City Wizards	(United States) Ryan McMahen	M/F	Michigan State
17	MetroStars	(United States) Peter Dzubay	GK	Michigan
18	FC Dallas	(United States) Brad Napper	M/F	Northwestern
19	D.C. United	(United States) Andy Metcalf	F	Memphis
20	Houston 1836	(United States) Hector Guzman	F	Santa Clara
21	Colorado Rapids	(Canada) Liam Girrard	D	Denver
22	Chicago Fire	(United States) Dasan Robinson	D	Dayton
23	New England Revolution	(Saint Kitts and Nevis) John Queeley	D	NC State
24	Los Angeles Galaxy	(United States) Daniel Paladini	M	Cal State Northridge

=== Round 2 trades ===
No trades reported.

== Round 3 ==
Pick #	MLS team	Player	Position	Affiliation
25	Chivas USA	(United States) Lawson Vaughn	M	Tulsa
26	Real Salt Lake	(United States) Chase Harrison	GK	Virginia Tech
27	Columbus Crew	(Mexico) Ivan Becerra	F	UC Santa Barbara
28	Kansas City Wizards	(United States) Corey Farabi	M	Drake
29	MetroStars	(United States) Brian Cvilikas	F	Old Dominion
30	FC Dallas	(United States) Sean Babcock	M	Portland
31	MetroStars (Note: #31: D.C. United → MetroStars. 4 February 2005: MetroStars acquired this third-round pick, originally "future considerations", from D.C. United in exchange for midfielder Kenny Arena.)	(United States) Brian Devlin	M	Penn State
32	Houston 1836	(United States) Tony Donatelli	M	Temple
33	Colorado Rapids	(United States) Keith Cauldwell	M	Brown
34	Chicago Fire	(Jamaica) Ezra Prendergast	D	Syracuse
35	New England Revolution	(United States) Adam Williamson	M	Lehigh
36	Los Angeles Galaxy	(El Salvador) Armando Melendez	M/F	Loyola Marymount

== Round 4 ==
Pick #	MLS team	Player	Position	Affiliation
37	Houston 1836 (Note: #37: Chivas USA → Houston 1836. 24 March 2005: Houston 1836, at the time still based in San Jose as the Earthquakes, acquired this fourth-round pick from Chivas USA in exchange for defender Victor Arbelaez.)	(United States) Josh Fender	F	West Texas A&M
38	Colorado Rapids (Note: #38: Real Salt Lake → Colorado Rapids. 20 April 2005: Colorado Rapids acquired this fourth-round selection from Real Salt Lake in exchange for midfielder Seth Trembly.)	(United States) Daniel Wasson	M/D	Tulsa
39	FC Dallas (Note: #39: Columbus Crew → MetroStars → FC Dallas. 5 August 2005: FC Dallas acquired this fourth-round pick, originally a conditional selection, from MetroStars in exchange for midfielder Eric Quill. On 1 July 2005, MetroStars had acquired this fourth-round pick from Columbus Crew in exchange for goalkeeper Jonny Walker.)	(United States) Peter Louis	F	Coastal Carolina
40	Kansas City Wizards	(United States) Chris Hamburger	M	Drake
41	Real Salt Lake (Note: #41: MetroStars → Real Salt Lake. 25 January 2006: Real Salt Lake acquired this fourth-round selection from MetroStars in exchange for forward Jordan Cila.)	(United States) Chris Lancos	D	Maryland
42	Chicago Fire (Note: #42: FC Dallas → Colorado Rapids → Chicago Fire. 15 September 2005: Chicago Fire acquired this fourth-round pick from Colorado Rapids in exchange for midfielder Alexandre Boucicaut. On 29 June 2005, Colorado had acquired this fourth-round pick from FC Dallas in exchange for midfielder John Pulido.)	(United States) Idris Ughiovhe	D	Howard
43	D.C. United	(United States) Devon McTavish	D	West Virginia
44	Houston 1836	PASS		
45	Kansas City Wizards (Note: '#45: Pick originally belonged to Colorado Rapids. → Kansas City Wizards.)	(United States) Luke Enna	M	Tampa
46	Chicago Fire	(Zimbabwe) Richard Mupfudze	F	Western Kentucky
47	New England Revolution	(United States) Matt Wieland	D	Creighton
48	Los Angeles Galaxy	(United States) Matt Couch	F	San Diego State
