= Jonathan Bornstein =

American soccer player (born 1984)

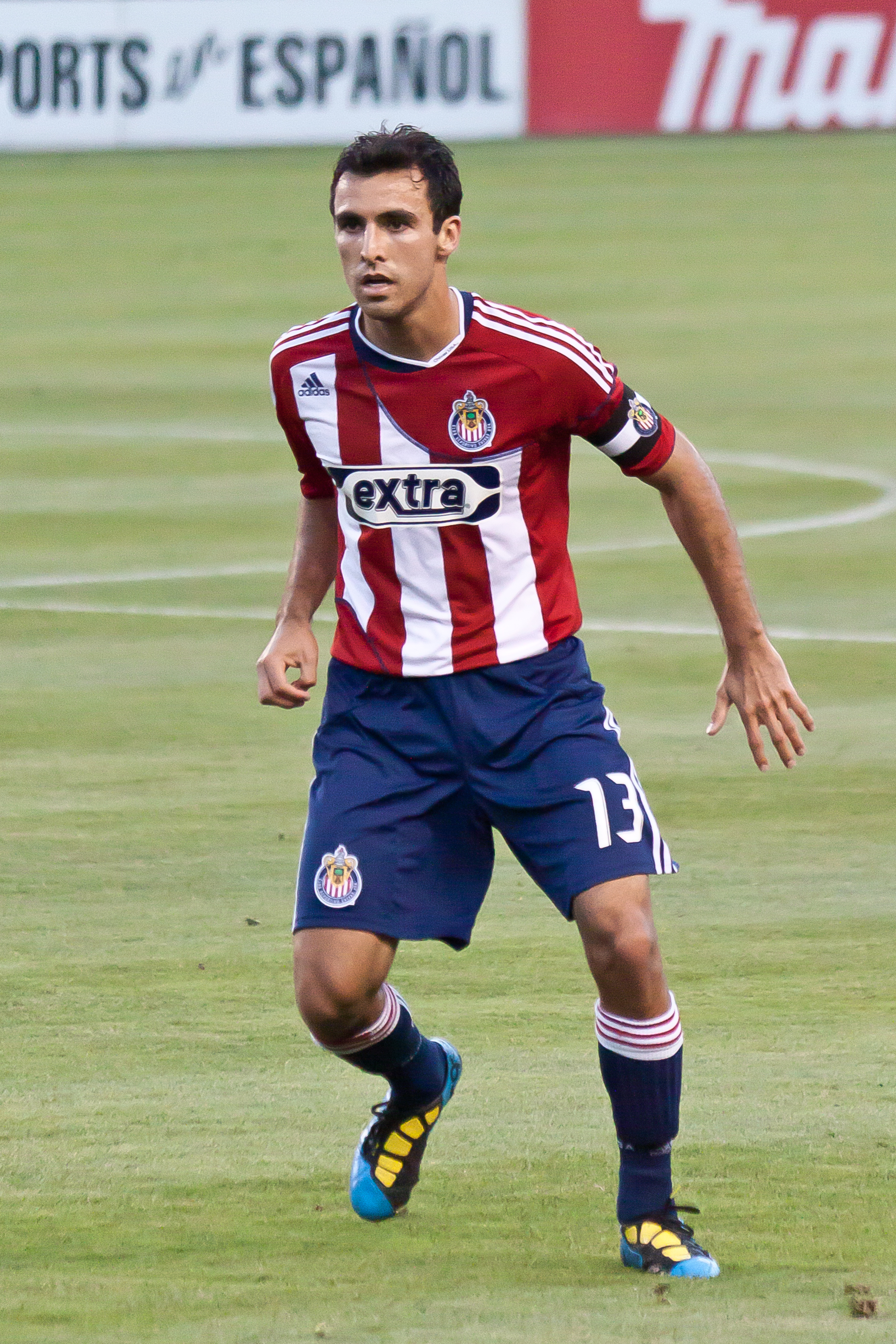
- Bornstein with Chivas USA in 2010

Personal information
- Full name: Jonathan Rey Bornstein
- Date of birth: November 7, 1984 (age 42)
- Place of birth: Torrance, California, U.S.
- Height: 5 ft 9 in (1.75 m)
- Position: Left-back

Youth career
- 1998–2002: Irvine Strikers

College career
Years	Team	Apps	(Gls)
2002–2003	Cal Poly Pomona Broncos	36	(17)
2004–2005	UCLA Bruins	40	(6)

Senior career*
Years	Team	Apps	(Gls)
2006–2010	Chivas USA	123	(9)
2011–2015	Tigres UANL	9	(0)
2014	→ Atlante (loan)	3	(0)
2014–2015	→ Querétaro (loan)	13	(1)
2015–2018	Querétaro	81	(2)
2018–2019	Maccabi Netanya	25	(1)
2019–2022	Chicago Fire	83	(2)
2023–2024	Vida	31	(0)
2024	Tallahassee SC	1	(0)

International career^{‡}
2007–2011	United States	38	(2)
Medal record
Representing United States
FIFA Confederations Cup
Runner-up	2009 South Africa	Team
CONCACAF Gold Cup
Winner	CONCACAF Gold Cup	2007
Runner-up	CONCACAF Gold Cup	2011
Men's Soccer
- * Club domestic league appearances and goals as of 18 January 2024 ‡ National team caps and goals as of 16 September 2023

Jonathan Rey Bornstein (born November 7, 1984) is an American former professional soccer player who played as a left-back. He has captained and made 38 appearances for the United States national team. In addition to also playing for Chivas USA in Major League Soccer (with whom he was the 2006 MLS Rookie of the Year, an MLS Best XI, and a two-time MLS All-Star), he has played in Liga MX and in the Israeli Premier League. He won a silver medal with Team USA at the 2005 Maccabiah Games, in Israel.

== Youth and college ==
Bornstein attended Los Alamitos High School, where he played soccer for all four years. He was MVP of the Sunset League, first-team all-county, and All-California Interscholastic Federation (CIF), and led the soccer team to a CIF Championship. He also played club soccer for Long Beach United, Beach Soccer Club, and the Irvine Strikers club team coached by Don Ebert. He won the Golden Boot Award as he led the Strikers to the US Youth Soccer 2002 Under-17 National Championship.

He started his college soccer career at Cal Poly Pomona and played there for the Cal Poly Pomona Broncos for two years. In 2002, Bornstein was California Collegiate Athletic Association (CCAA) Freshman of the Year, first-team All-CCAA, and second-team All-Far West Region, as he led the team in scoring. In 2003, he was again first-team All-CCAA and second-team All-Far West Region, and was selected to the College Sports Information Directors of America (CoSIDA) Academic All-America College Division District VIII team with a 3.30 GPA in Business Administration, as he led Cal Poly in all scoring categories. He finished his career at Cal Poly Pomona ranked second in career assists (19), third in career points (53), and fifth in career goals (19).

He then transferred to UCLA for the 2004 season as a sociology major. In 2004, Bornstein played in all of the UCLA's 20 games, with nine starts. In 2005, he started all 20 games and was named second-team All-Pac-10.

Bornstein was a teammate of Benny Feilhaber at the youth (with the Irvine Strikers), college (at UCLA, where they were roommates), and national-team level, and at the Maccabiah Games in Israel. Feilhaber said he and Bornstein "definitely had a special connection" because of their religion from the beginning of their friendship.

== Club career ==
=== Chivas USA ===
Bornstein was selected by Chivas USA in the fourth round (37th overall) of the 2006 MLS SuperDraft. A forward in college, he was converted to a left back by Chivas coach Bob Bradley, and was his team's surprising starter at the position when the season opened. Injuries and suspensions forced Bornstein back into an attacking role for Chivas USA's June 3 match against FC Dallas, where the rookie scored his first MLS goal. He continued his fine play in the back and also contributed to the attack during the rest of the season, finishing the year with four assists and six goals, leading all rookies. He started every game in the season, and his total of 2,878 minutes played was third-highest in the league. He was rewarded for his fine form by winning the 2006 MLS Rookie of the Year Award.

In 2007, he was an MLS All-Star, and named to the MLS Best XI as one of the best 11 players in Major League Soccer. In 2008, Bornstein suffered a knee injury that affected him throughout the spring. When he came back, Chivas coach Preki began to employ him in an attacking capacity, which Bornstein trained for in his youth. He repeated as an MLS All-Star in 2008.

In summer 2008, Israeli club Maccabi Tel Aviv was reportedly interested in Bornstein. News stories claimed that the offer involved a transfer fee of $750,000 and would increase the player's salary five-fold to around $500,000 a season. Bornstein was apparently unenthusiastic, fearing that such a move could cost him his place in the U.S. national team.

In 2009, he was the Chivas USA Defender of the Year (2009) and captain. In five seasons with Chivas USA (2006–10), Bornstein made 123 regular season appearances (117 starts).

=== Liga MX ===
Bornstein spent the next eight seasons in Mexico's first division, Liga MX. He first played for Tigres de la UANL (2010–14). In July 2010, it was announced by Chivas USA that Bornstein would join Tigres de la UANL in January 2011, following the conclusion of the 2010 Major League Soccer season.

Bornstein was selected by Portland Timbers in the 2010 MLS Expansion Draft. In doing so, Portland retained his MLS rights should he ever return to the league. On February 13, 2013, Portland traded Bornstein's MLS rights back to Chivas USA with allocation money for midfielder Ben Zemanski.

Bornstein was transfer listed by Tigres on November 19, 2012.

He played for Atlante F.C. (2013–14) and Querétaro F.C. (2014–18). On May 24, 2015, Bornstein scored the goal that sent Querétaro F.C. to their first-ever Liga MX final. Then, on June 10, 2015, it was announced that Bornstain had signed for Querétaro on a permanent basis.

While playing in Mexico, he made 128 appearances and won the 2011–12 Liga MX championship, as well as the 2016–17 Copa MX and 2017 Supercopa MX titles.

=== Maccabi Netanya ===
In 2018, Bornstein signed with Maccabi Netanya of the Israeli Premier League ahead of the 2018–19 League campaign. Playing for Maccabi Netanya in Netanya, Israel in 2018–19, he became an Israeli citizen due to his Jewish lineage. During his time with the club, Bornstein made 36 appearances with 35 starts, totaling 3,163 minutes across all competitions.

=== Chicago Fire ===
The Chicago Fire of MLS acquired him from Maccabi Netanya on July 22, 2019. The team signed Bornstein to a contract through 2020, with a 2021 club option that the team exercised in July 2020. In 2019, he played in 11 starts in his first season with the Fire. Bornstein left Chicago at the end of the 2022 season.

== International career ==
Bornstein has made 38 appearances for the United States national soccer team. He got his first cap, and scored his first goal on an assist from Justin Mapp, for the U.S. national team on January 20, 2007, against Denmark. As 2007 continued, Bornstein became the first choice left back for Bob Bradley. He played for the U.S. in Copa América 2007. He received his first World Cup Qualifying appearance in a start against Guatemala in the semifinal round of World Cup Qualifying. In 2007, he helped the USMNT win the CONCACAF Gold Cup, making five starts during the tournament. He featured in the Concacaf Gold Cup (2007, 2011).

In 2008, Bornstein lost his starting place to Heath Pearce and also struggled with injuries. He started the group stage matches at the 2009 FIFA Confederations Cup, but was relegated back to the bench when Carlos Bocanegra returned from injury.

After the Confederations Cup, Bornstein eventually replaced Pearce as first-choice again and remained so for the rest of the qualifiers. He scored the equalizing goal in the United States' final World Cup qualifier against Costa Rica in the fifth minute of injury time. The goal meant that Honduras, when combined with their win over El Salvador, a game in which Bornstein captained the US side, qualified automatically for the 2010 World Cup. That goal resulted in Bornstein having a level of celebrity in Honduras; he was invited to Honduras by the President of the country and he received letters of thanks for years afterwards.

After sitting out the first two group-stage games for the United States in the 2010 World Cup, Bornstein started at left back against Algeria in the final group game and against Ghana in the round of 16.

Bornstein was never recalled to the squad by Bradley's successor, Jürgen Klinsmann, by Klinsmann's successor, Bruce Arena, or by Arena's successor, interim manager Dave Sarachan.

=== Maccabiah Games ===
Bornstein played in the 2005 Maccabiah Games, in Israel, representing the U.S. along with Benny Feilhaber, Kevin Friedland, Matt Reiswerg, and Leo Krupnik, winning a silver medal. He scored two goals in the team's quarterfinal win over South Africa. Because of his Jewish lineage, he had an opportunity to play in Israel and not count as a foreign player.

== Personal life ==
Bornstein was born in Torrance, California, and later lived in Los Alamitos, California. His father is Jeff Bornstein, who is Jewish and was born in Torrance into an Orthodox family, and worked for Hostess until his death in 2014. His mother is from Mexico, and is not Jewish. Bornstein's parents divorced when he was three years old, and he lived with his father. His stepmother, Rochelle Bornstein, works as a deli supervisor and cashier at a grocery store in Long Beach, California. His father's family were Romanian Jews. Bornstein grew up observing Rosh Hashanah and Passover with relatives, and said of his experience representing the U.S. in the 2005 Maccabiah Games reinforcing his Jewish identity: "I was able to explore my Jewish identity in the Old City, at Masada, at the Dead Sea." In 2006 he said: "in the past couple years, I've felt more Jewish than ever." He found faith in Christianity when he met his wife, and was baptized, while in Mexico. He told ESPN, "Just experiencing both cultures, sometimes I felt like I didn't know where I belonged. It's still a soul-searching kind of thing, trying to figure out exactly where you come from or which heritage you relate to. I still kind of feel lost even to this day, but it's something that I just deal with, and it makes me a stronger person having both of those heritages."

His brother Andrew played soccer at Cal Poly Pomona, and is now a marketing director. He has a third brother, Taylor. His wife, Juliana, is from Brazil, and he has two daughters.

== Career statistics ==
=== Club ===
As of match played October 1, 2022

Appearances and goals by club, season and competition
Club	Season	League			National cup		Continental		Other		Total	
Club	Season	Division	Apps	Goals	Apps	Goals	Apps	Goals	Apps	Goals	Apps	Goals
Chivas USA	2006	Major League Soccer	32	6	—		—		2 (Note: Appearance(s) in MLS Cup Playoffs)	0	34	6
Chivas USA	2007	Major League Soccer	23	1	—		—		2	0	25	1
Chivas USA	2008	Major League Soccer	21	2	—		2 (Note: Appearance(s) in CONCACAF Champions League)	0	2	0	25	2
Chivas USA	2009	Major League Soccer	26	0	—		—		2	0	28	0
Chivas USA	2010	Major League Soccer	21	0	1	0	2 (Note: Appearances in North American SuperLiga)	0	—		24	0
Chivas USA	Total		123	9	1	0	4	0	8	0	136	9
Tigres UANL	2010–11	Liga MX	7	0	—		—		—		7	0
Tigres UANL	2011–12	Liga MX	0	0	—		—		—		0	0
Tigres UANL	2012–13	Liga MX	2	0	—		4 (Note: Two appearances in CONCACAF Champions League and two appearances in Copa Libertadores)	0	—		6	0
Tigres UANL	2013–14	Liga MX	0	0	7	0	—		—		7	0
Tigres UANL	Total		9	0	7	0	4	0	—		20	0
Atlante (loan)	2013–14	Liga MX	3	0	3	0	—		—		6	0
Querétaro (loan)	2014–15	Liga MX	13	1	5	0	—		—		18	1
Querétaro	2015–16	Liga MX	27	0	—		5	0	—		32	0
Querétaro	2016–17	Liga MX	27	1	7	0	—		—		34	1
Querétaro	2017–18	Liga MX	14	0	8	0	—		—		22	0
Querétaro	Total		81	2	20	0	5	0	—		106	2
Maccabi Netanya	2018–19	Israeli Premier League	25	1	6	0	—		5 (Note: Appearances in Toto Cup)	0	36	1
Chicago Fire	2019	Major League Soccer	11	0	—		—		—		11	0
Chicago Fire	2020	Major League Soccer	20	1	—		—		—		20	1
Chicago Fire	2021	Major League Soccer	30	0	—		—		—		30	0
Chicago Fire	2022	Major League Soccer	22	1	—		—		—		22	1
Chicago Fire	Total		83	2	0	0	0	0	0	0	83	2
Career total			324	14	37	0	13	0	13	0	387	14

=== International ===
As of November 24, 2011

National team	Year	Apps	Goals
United States
United States	2007	12	1
United States	2008	1	0
United States	2009	13	1
United States	2010	10	0
United States	2011	2	0
United States	Total	38	2

=== International goals ===
#	Date	Venue	Opponent	Score	Result	Competition
01.	January 20, 2007	Home Depot Center, Carson, United States	Denmark	2 – 1	3–1	Friendly
02.	October 14, 2009	RFK Stadium, Washington, United States	Costa Rica	2 – 2	2–2	2010 World Cup qualifier

== Honors ==
UANL

- Mexican Primera División: Apertura 2011

Querétaro

- Copa MX: Apertura 2016
- Supercopa MX: 2017

United States

- CONCACAF Gold Cup: 2007

Individual

- MLS Rookie of the Year: 2006
- MLS Best XI: 2007
- MLS All-Star: 2007, 2008
- Inducted into the Southern California Jewish Sports Hall of Fame: 2008.

== See also ==
- List of select Jewish football (association; soccer) players

Sporting positions
Preceded by Jesse Marsch	Chivas USA captain 2010; Served alongside: Sacha Kljestan	Succeeded by Simon Elliott
