= Erasmo Solórzano =

Mexican footballer (born 1985)

Personal information
- Full name: Erasmo Solórzano
- Date of birth: July 20, 1985 (age 41)
- Place of birth: Los Fresnos, Michoacán, Mexico
- Height: 5 ft 9 in (1.75 m)
- Position: Midfielder

Youth career
- 2003–2006: UC Riverside Highlanders

Senior career*
| Years | Team | Apps | (Gls) |
| 2006 | Los Angeles Storm | 15 | (3) |
| 2007 | Chivas USA | 1 | (0) |
| 2008 | Bakersfield Brigade | | |
- * Club domestic league appearances and goals

Erasmo Solórzano (born July 20, 1985) is a Mexican former footballer.
