= Jason Hernandez =

Footballer & sports executive

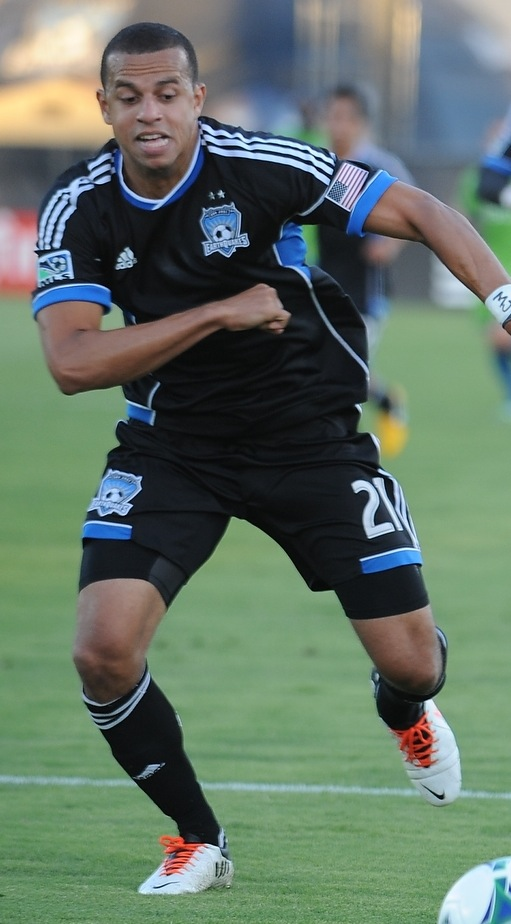
- Hernandez with the San Jose Earthquakes in 2013

Personal information
- Full name: Jason Hernandez
- Date of birth: August 26, 1983 (age 43)
- Place of birth: New York, New York, United States
- Height: 5 ft 10 in (1.78 m)
- Position: Defender

College career
Years	Team	Apps	(Gls)
2001–2004	Seton Hall Pirates		

Senior career*
Years	Team	Apps	(Gls)
2005	MetroStars	3	(0)
2006–2007	Chivas USA	50	(0)
2008–2014	San Jose Earthquakes	165	(0)
2015–2016	New York City FC	57	(0)
2017–2018	Toronto FC	18	(0)
2017–2018	→ Toronto FC II (loan)	2	(0)
Total		295	(0)

International career
2016	Puerto Rico	3	(0)
- * Club domestic league appearances and goals

Jason Hernandez (born August 26, 1983) is former professional soccer player who is the general manager of Major League Soccer club Toronto FC. He previously played for the Puerto Rico national team as a defender.

Hernandez played prep soccer at Paramus Catholic High School.

== College ==
Hernandez played college soccer at Seton Hall University from 2001 to 2004, and captained the team in his final two seasons. He was also named Second Team ALL-BIG EAST in 2004.

== Club career ==
=== MetroStars ===
Hernandez was selected by the MetroStars with the sixth pick in the first round of the 2005 MLS Supplemental Draft and signed a developmental contract with the team for the 2005 season. After not playing a minute in the club's first 29 league games, he made his debut against Chicago on October 5, 2005. He started the last three games of the regular season, as well as both games in the playoffs.

=== Chivas USA ===
Hernandez was traded to Chivas USA in a trade that allowed the MetroStars to move up to the first selection of the 2006 MLS SuperDraft and select Marvell Wynne.

In his initial campaign with Chivas, Hernandez went on to appear in 29 league matches, including 24 starts. During the 2007 season Hernandez saw his role reduced as he appeared in 21 league matches, starting only nine. He started three of the club's four playoff matches during his two-year stint at the Los Angeles-based club.

=== San Jose Earthquakes ===
Hernandez was picked up by the San Jose Earthquakes in the 2007 MLS Expansion Draft. He made his debut on April 3, 2008, starting against LA Galaxy.

Hernandez would play for the club through the 2014 season, and would captain the team multiple times. His 160 games started and 13,859 minutes played placed him third all time in both categories for the club.

=== New York City ===
Hernandez was selected by New York City FC as the 6th pick in the 2014 MLS Expansion Draft. He would start in their first ever MLS game, a 1–1 draw with Orlando City SC on March 8, 2015.

After the signing of Italian legend Andrea Pirlo in July 2015, Hernandez changed his number from 21 to 2 to honor his boyhood idol, New York Yankees legendary shortstop Derek Jeter. He was not retained following the 2016 season.

=== Toronto FC ===
Hernandez was signed by Toronto FC in March 2017. He made his Toronto FC debut and his first start of the season on May 6, 2017, playing the full 90 minutes in a 1–0 win against the Seattle Sounders FC.

Hernandez was re-signed by Toronto FC on April 13, 2018. He was released at the end of the 2018 season following the expiration of his contract.

Hernandez announced his retirement from professional football on April 2, 2019, and that he would be joining Toronto's front office as Manager of Player Engagement.

Hernandez was named General Manager of Toronto FC on June 27, 2023.

== International career ==
Hernandez was born in the United States to parents of Puerto Rican descent. In January 2009, he was called for a training camp with the United States, but he did not appear in a match for the team. Eligible for Puerto Rico through his parents, he made his international debut with the team in March 2016 during a Caribbean Cup qualifier against Guyana.

== Management career ==
After retiring as a professional player in April 2019, he became Toronto FC's Manager of Player Engagement. He later became the team's Assistant General Manager, Player Personnel and Engagement Strategy in 2021, before being promoted to General Manager in June 2023.

== Career statistics ==
=== Club ===
Appearances and goals by club, season and competition
Club	Season	League			Playoffs (Note: Includes MLS Cup playoffs)		National cup (Note: Includes U.S. Open Cup, Canadian Championship)		Continental		Total	
Club	Season	Division	Apps	Goals	Apps	Goals	Apps	Goals	Apps	Goals	Apps	Goals
MetroStars	2005	Major League Soccer	3	0	2	0	0	0	—		5	0
Chivas USA	2006	Major League Soccer	29	0	2	0	0	0	—		31	0
Chivas USA	2007	Major League Soccer	21	0	1	0	0	0	—		22	0
Chivas USA	Total		50	0	3	0	0	0	0	0	53	0
San Jose Earthquakes	2008	Major League Soccer	28	0	—		0	0	—		28	0
San Jose Earthquakes	2009	Major League Soccer	16	0	—		0	0	—		16	0
San Jose Earthquakes	2010	Major League Soccer	27	0	3	0	0	0	—		30	0
San Jose Earthquakes	2011	Major League Soccer	28	0	—		0	0	—		28	0
San Jose Earthquakes	2012	Major League Soccer	25	0	2	0	1	0	—		28	0
San Jose Earthquakes	2013	Major League Soccer	21	0	—		0	0	4 (Note: Appearances in CONCACAF Champions League)	0	25	0
San Jose Earthquakes	2014	Major League Soccer	20	0	—		1	0	—		21	0
San Jose Earthquakes	Total		165	0	5	0	2	0	4	0	176	0
New York City FC	2015	Major League Soccer	26	0	—		1	0	—		27	0
New York City FC	2016	Major League Soccer	31	0	0	0	1	0	—		32	0
New York City FC	Total		57	0	0	0	2	0	0	0	59	0
Toronto FC	2017	Major League Soccer	8	0	0	0	1	0	—		9	0
Toronto FC	2018	Major League Soccer	10	0	—		2	0	0	0	12	0
Toronto FC	Total		18	0	0	0	3	0	0	0	21	0
Toronto FC II (loan)	2017	USL	1	0	—		—		—		1	0
Toronto FC II (loan)	2018	USL	1	0	—		—		—		1	0
Toronto FC II (loan)	Total		2	0	0	0	0	0	0	0	2	0
Career total			295	0	10	0	7	0	4	0	316	0

=== International ===
Appearances and goals by national team and year
National team	Year	Apps	Goals
Puerto Rico	2016	3	0
Total		3	0

== Honors ==
=== Club ===
==== San Jose Earthquakes ====
- Supporters' Shield: 2012

==== Toronto FC ====
- MLS Cup: 2017
- Supporters' Shield: 2017
- Eastern Conference Winners (Playoffs): 2017
- Canadian Championship: 2017
- Trillium Cup: 2017
