= Laurent Merlin =

French footballer (born 1984)

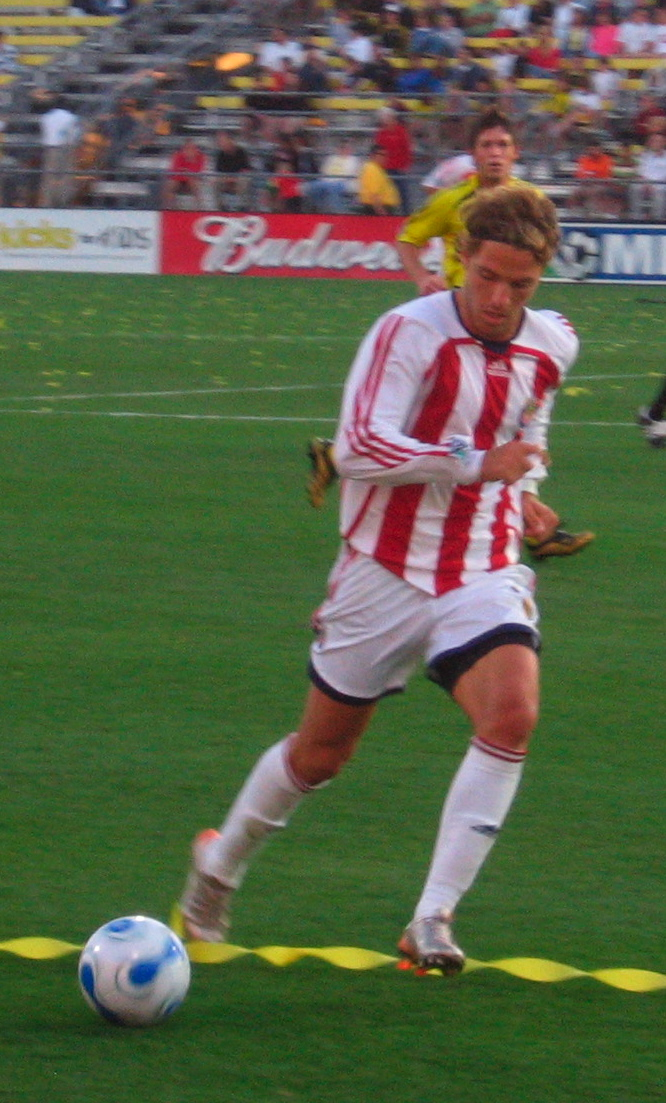
- Merlin in 2007

Personal information
- Date of birth: 17 October 1984 (age 42)
- Place of birth: Marseille, France
- Height: 1.78 m (5 ft 10 in)
- Position: Midfielder

Youth career
- 1994–2002: Marseille

Senior career*
Years	Team	Apps	(Gls)
2002–2004	Marseille	2	(0)
2004–2006	Ajaccio	13	(1)
2006	→ Châteauroux (loan)	3	(0)
2007	Chivas USA	23	(1)
2008	St Patrick's Athletic	?	(?)
2008–2010	Cassis Carnoux	20	(4)
2011–2012	Latina	1	(0)
2013–2014	Marseille B	0	(0)
2015–2017	Marseille Endoume		
- * Club domestic league appearances and goals

Laurent Merlin (born 17 October 1984) is a French former professional footballer who played as a midfielder. He started his career as a youngster with the Olympique de Marseille reserve team, where he quickly progressed into the senior squad and earned two caps over two seasons with the seniors. Laurent was then snapped up by Corsica based French league team, AC Ajaccio. He got his first senior goal with the club before being loaned to LB Châteauroux and, on his return, was sold to Chivas USA.

== Club career ==
=== Marseille ===
Born in Marseille, France, at the age of just ten, Merlin was training with his hometown club, Olympique de Marseille. From the youth team, he was able to make a name for himself, and soon found himself in Olympique de Marseille 2, the Marseille reserve team. Whilst at Marseille, Laurent only played in two matches and soon found himself surplus to requirements at l'Ohème.

=== Ajaccio and Châteauroux loan ===
In 2004 Merlin signed for fellow Ligue 1 side, Corsica-based, AC Ajaccio. At Ajaccio, he played twelve games in his first two seasons, ten more than when at Olympique de Marseille, a club of which he had been a part of the senior squad for two seasons. In these twelve games, he scored one goal.

In the following season, Merlin started one game for Ajaccio, soon becoming another back-up player.

In the early months of 2006, Merlin was loaned to a lower league, French side, LB Châteauroux. However, he started three games before returning to Ajaccio.

=== Chivas USA ===
Merlin took part in Major League Soccer side Los Angeles Galaxy's first-ever open tryout in February 2007. The tryout was highly publicized in anticipation of the signing of David Beckham by the Galaxy. Through two days of intense competition with over 800 players from all over the world, he was one of two to survive four rounds of cuts and earn a trial with the Galaxy. However, he then signed for local rivals side Chivas USA. He played 22 games for the club, scoring one goal, before he was waived in 2007.

=== Cassis Carnoux ===
During the 2009–10 season, Merlin played for French Championnat National side Cassis Carnoux. He left the club following their relegation at the end of the season.

In July 2010, he had trials in England with Premier League sides Wigan Athletic and Blackpool.

=== Italy ===
In mid-2011, he left for U.S. Latina Calcio, Lega Pro 1 Divisione.

== International career ==
Merlin was capped at under-17, under-18 and under-19 level by France.
