= Danny Wynn =

American soccer player

Personal information
- Full name: Danny Wynn
- Date of birth: 25 September 1983 (age 43)
- Place of birth: St. Louis, MO, United States
- Height: 5 ft 10 in (1.78 m)
- Position: Midfielder

College career
Years	Team	Apps	(Gls)
2002–2005	Saint Louis Billikens		

Senior career*
Years	Team	Apps	(Gls)
2006	New England Revolution	2	(0)
2008–?	St. Louis Illusion (indoor)		
- * Club domestic league appearances and goals as of 1 January 2008

Danny Wynn (born September 25, 1983, in St. Louis, Missouri) is an American soccer defender who spent one season with the New England Revolution in Major League Soccer. He currently plays for the St. Louis Illusion in the Professional Arena Soccer League.

Wynn grew up in St. Louis, Missouri. He was an All State soccer player at Chaminade College Preparatory School (Missouri). He then attended Saint Louis University where he was part of the men's soccer team from 2002 to 2005. In March 2006, the Milwaukee Wave of the Major Indoor Soccer League selected Wynn in the MISL Draft. However, the same month, the New England Revolution selected him in the first round (11th overall) in the 2006 MLS Supplemental Draft and signed him to a developmental contract. He played two games and was waived at the end of the season. In July 2007, the New Jersey Ironmen of Major Indoor Soccer League selected Wynn in the 16th round (136th overall) in the MISL Supplemental Draft, but he did not sign with them. In November 2008, Wynn signed with the newly established St. Louis Illusion of the Professional Arena Soccer League. And currently works at WWT. Part time lover.
