= Tim Regan =

American soccer player and coach

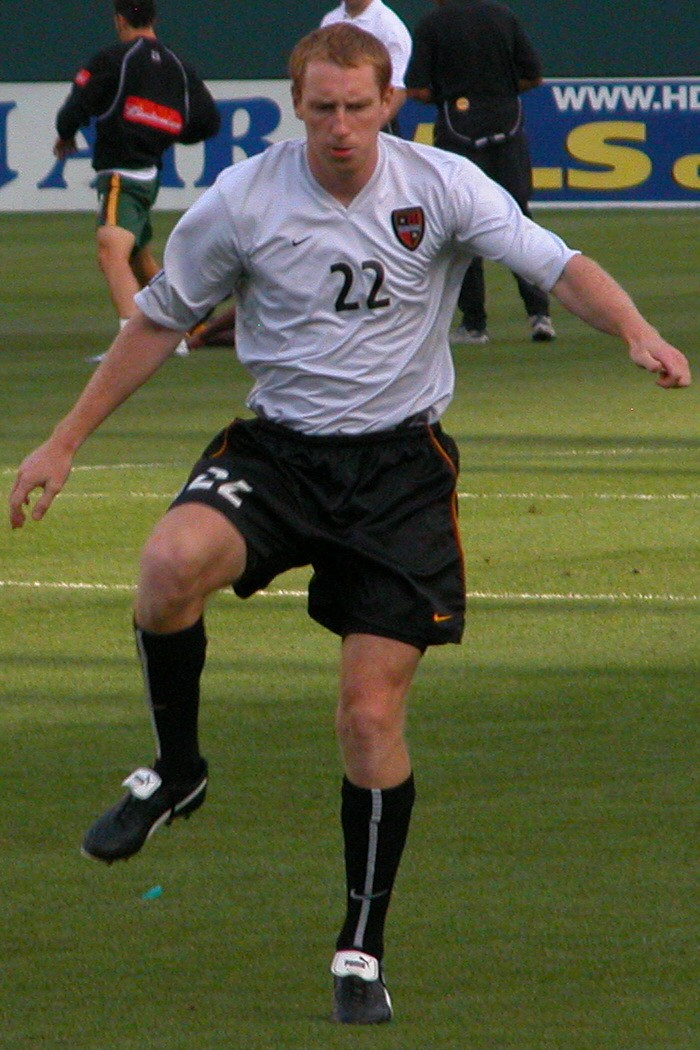

Personal information
- Full name: Tim Regan
- Date of birth: June 27, 1981 (age 45)
- Place of birth: Orland Hills, Illinois, U.S.
- Height: 6 ft 1 in (1.85 m)
- Position: Defender

College career
Years	Team	Apps	(Gls)
1999–2002	Bradley		

Senior career*
Years	Team	Apps	(Gls)
2001–2002	Chicago Fire Premier		
2003–2005	MetroStars	47	(0)
2006	Chivas USA	30	(0)
2007	New York Red Bulls	3	(0)
2008	Toronto FC	1	(0)

Managerial career
- 2014–2015: Indy Eleven (assistant)
- 2015: Indy Eleven (interim)
- 2018–2023: Bradley Braves (assistant)
- 2024–: Bradley Braves
- * Club domestic league appearances and goals as of April 3, 2009

Tim Regan (born June 27, 1981) is an American former soccer defender, and coach who currently is the head coach for the Bradley Braves men's soccer program.

== College ==
Regan played college soccer at Bradley University from 1999 to 2002, where he established himself as one of the best players in the program's history. After starting 20 games as a freshman, Regan was named second-team All-Missouri Valley Conference as a sophomore, after registering two goals and two assists from a defensive midfield position. Regan was moved to defense as a junior, and proved more than up to the task - he finished the year as a first-team All-MVC winner, and the team's co-MVP with Gavin Glinton. Regan remained at defense as a senior and performed even better, winning MVC Defensive Player of the Year while being instrumental in the team posting a 0.81 goals against average.

== Professional ==
Upon graduating, Regan was selected 17th overall in the 2003 MLS SuperDraft by MetroStars of Major League Soccer. Regan was versatile, but not overly impressive in MLS. As a rookie, he appeared in 15 games, starting seven, at numerous positions in the defense and midfield. Regan received less playing time in 2004, playing in just 12 games. His hard work was rewarded with an expanded role in 2005, as he started 18 out of 20 matches. However, on March 1, 2006, Regan was released by MetroStars. One month later he was signed by his former Metro coach Bob Bradley at Chivas USA where he became a surprise starter.

After the 2006 season, Regan was picked up by Toronto FC in the 2006 MLS Expansion Draft, but later traded to New York Red Bulls (the former MetroStars) for forward Edson Buddle. He was waived by New York during the 2007 season.

In the spring of 2008, Regan trained with Chicago Fire and appeared in a preseason games for his hometown club, but was not offered a contract. Later that season, he would, however, sign a 'one-day contract' with Toronto FC — who were missing nine players to international duty — in order to play in a game against his former club, Chivas USA. Regan eventually signed a deal with Toronto that kept him at the club until the end of the season. He retired following the 2008 season to become Toronto's head of scouting.

He is also a "Soccer Operations & Scouting" instructor for the online sports career training school, Sports Management Worldwide, in Portland, OR.

== Coaching career ==
On November 11, 2013, Regan was named as assistant coach for Indy Eleven of the NASL. On June 2, 2015, Regan was named Indy's interim head coach, following the dismissal of Juergen Sommer.

Regan served as is an assistant coach for his alma mater, Bradley, under the Braves' head coach, Jim DeRose from 2018 until 2023. He also became the head coach of USL League Two expansion club Peoria City in 2020. In 2023, Regan became the head coach at Bradley replacing the retiring DeRose.
