= Jordan Russolillo =

American soccer player

Personal information
- Date of birth: April 3, 1984 (age 42)
- Place of birth: Middletown, CT, United States
- Height: 5 ft 11 in (1.80 m)
- Position: Defender

Team information
- Current team: Chicago Kickers (manager)

Youth career
- 2002–2005: Southern Connecticut State

Senior career*
Years	Team	Apps	(Gls)
2004–2005	Danbury Portuguese	12	(6)
2006–2008	Chicago Fire	2	(0)
- Mandella United Bronx, NY
- * Club domestic league appearances and goals

Jordan Russolillo (born April 3, 1984) is an American former professional soccer player

== Career ==
He played for the Chicago Fire two games in the Major League Soccer.

Russolillo retired in December 2008 due to career ending hip surgery and signed a contract as assistant coach for Southern Connecticut State University Men's Soccer.
