= Seth Trembly =

American soccer player (born 1982)

Personal information
- Full name: Seth Trembly
- Date of birth: March 21, 1982 (age 44)
- Place of birth: Littleton, Colorado, United States
- Height: 5 ft 6 in (1.68 m)
- Positions: Midfielder; defender

Senior career*
Years	Team	Apps	(Gls)
2000–2004	Colorado Rapids	52	(2)
2000	→ MLS Pro-40 (loan)	12	(0)
2005–2006	Real Salt Lake	22	(2)
2007	Montreal Impact	18	(0)

Managerial career
- 2013–2016: UC San Diego Tritons (asst.)
- 2017–2023: Utah Valley Wolverines (women's asst.)
- * Club domestic league appearances and goals

Seth Trembly (born March 21, 1982) is a former American soccer defensive midfielder.

Trembly was part of the original 1999 class at the Bradenton Academy, where, as part of the Under-17 United States national team, he trained with Landon Donovan, DaMarcus Beasley, and Bobby Convey, as well as his future teammates at the Rapids, Kyle Beckerman and Jordan Cila.

Rather than go to college, Trembly signed a Project 40 contract with MLS, and was allocated to his hometown team, the Colorado Rapids, joining the club at the end of the 1999 season. In 2000, he played twelve games with the MLS Pro-40 team. In his first four years, Trembly appeared in a total of 12 games for the Rapids, starting one. He at last began to break into the team in 2003, when injuries gave him the opportunity to play in 16 games, starting 11, for the team; he registered a goal and an assist. In 2004, he was largely a late defensive substitute, appearing in 24 games, but starting five, playing mostly as a defensive midfielder, but some as an outside back. The Rapids traded Trembly to Salt Lake in early 2005. He scored two goal in his first season with Real Salt Lake, but did not play a minute in 2006 because of two tears to his ACL. Although he was not able to play he did put his recovery time to good use, putting on a benefit concert for Right to Play, a charity that works to bring soccer to kids in Africa. He received the reward of Humanitarian of the Year. He signed a contract with the Montreal Impact in the United Soccer Leagues for the 2007 season.

In 2017, Trembly was hired as an assistant coach for the women's soccer team at Utah Valley University.
