= Johnny García =

Mexican footballer (born 1978)

Personal information
- Full name: Johnny García Lopez
- Date of birth: July 19, 1978 (age 48)
- Place of birth: Guadalajara, Jalisco, Mexico
- Height: 1.80 m (5 ft 11 in)
- Position: Defender

Youth career
- 2000–2001: Tapatio

Senior career*
Years	Team	Apps	(Gls)
2001–2006	Guadalajara	138	(10)
2006	Chivas USA	2	(0)
2006–2007	Chiapas	10	(0)
2007–2010	Santos Laguna	23	(1)
- * Club domestic league appearances and goals as of 1 June 2008

Johnny García Lopez (born 19 July 1978) is a Mexican former professional footballer who played as a defender.

== Club career ==
García made his debut for Club Deportivo Guadalajara of the Primera División de México as a midfielder in the 2001 Spring season, eventually playing nine games that season. After three more seasons as a midfielder, García was moved to central defense by Hans Westerhof, where he was a consistent starter throughout 2004. He joined Chivas USA in August 2006. His stint with Chivas USA lasted a short while, as he was released and consequently bought by Jaguares de Chiapas, marking his return to the Mexican Primera Division. With Chivas, García made a last minute goal against his current team Chiapas F.C.. This secured Chivas a semi-final berth, where it played against Pachuca and managed another last minute goal. During the 2007 Draft Santos Laguna acquired him from Chiapas F.C.
