= Jesús Morales =

Mexican footballer (born 1985)

Personal information
- Full name: Jesús Morales Martínez
- Date of birth: 18 December 1985 (age 40)
- Place of birth: Uruapan, Michoacán, Mexico
- Height: 1.71 m (5 ft 7 in)
- Position: Striker

Senior career*
Years	Team	Apps	(Gls)
2005–2008	Guadalajara	3	(0)
2006	→ Chivas USA (loan)	7	(0)
2008	León	2	(0)
2009	Potros Chetumal	13	(8)
2009–2011	Atlante	2	(0)
2011	C.F. La Piedad		
- * Club domestic league appearances and goals as of 28 April 2009

Jesús Morales Martínez (born December 18, 1985) is a Mexican former professional footballer, who last played as a striker for C.F. La Piedad, wearing jersey #25. He made his debut for Chivas de Guadalajara April 9, 2005 against Chiapas, a game which resulted in a 0–2 loss for Guadalajara. At one point during 2006, he was loaned to Chivas USA of Major League Soccer, and played seven games for the team.
