= Juan Pablo García =

Mexican footballer (born 1981)

Personal information
- Full name: Juan Pablo García Contreras
- Date of birth: 24 November 1981 (age 44)
- Place of birth: Guadalajara, Jalisco, Mexico
- Height: 1.75 m (5 ft 9 in)
- Position: Attacking midfielder

Senior career*
Years	Team	Apps	(Gls)
1999–2005	Atlas	116	(26)
2005–2006	Chivas USA	38	(9)
2007	Tigres UANL	18	(2)
2008	Chiapas	9	(2)
2009–2010	Tigres UANL	19	(2)
2010	Veracruz	24	(1)
2011	Puebla	3	(0)
2012–2014	Mérida	6	(0)

International career
2004	Mexico U23	3	(0)
2005	Mexico	1	(0)

Managerial career
- 2020–2021: Jaguares de Jalisco
- 2023: La Piedad
- 2025: Atlético Aragón
- * Club domestic league appearances and goals

Juan Pablo García Contreras (born 24 November 1981) is a Mexican former professional footballer who played as an attacking midfielder. After his retirement, he became depressed and alcoholic but has since recovered.

== Club career ==
Garcia was trained in the FC Atlas youth system and made his debut in the Verano 2000 season against Pachuca CF. He signed with Chivas USA in July 2005 and returned to Mexico following the 2006 Major League Soccer season and signed with CD Tigres UANL.

Nicknamed Loquito, he last played for Mérida.

== International career ==
He played for the Mexico national team at the 2004 Olympics. He received his first cap for the senior national team on July 10 in a 2005 CONCACAF Gold Cup match against Guatemala.

== Honours ==
Mexico U23

- CONCACAF Olympic Qualifying Championship: 2004
