= Drew Helm =

American soccer player (born 1984)

Personal information
- Full name: Andrew Spencer Helm
- Date of birth: November 9, 1984 (age 41)
- Place of birth: Jupiter, Florida, United States
- Height: 6 ft 1 in (1.85 m)
- Position: Forward

Team information
- Current team: South Florida Surf
- Number: 23

College career
| Years | Team | Apps | (Gls) |
| 2003–2004 | South Florida Bulls | 19 | (3) |
| 2005 | Florida Atlantic Owls | 4 | (2) |

Senior career*
| Years | Team | Apps | (Gls) |
| 2006 | Chivas USA | 8 | (0) |
| 2007–2008 | Marinhas | 5 | (3) |
| 2008–2011 | Bodens BK | 8 | (5) |
| 2012–201? | Orlando City U-23 | 1 | (0) |
| 2016 | South Florida Surf | 7 | (1) |
- * Club domestic league appearances and goals as of 1 Aug 2008

Andrew "Drew" Spencer Helm (born November 9, 1984) is a former American soccer player.

== Early life and collegiate career ==
Drew Helm was born in Jupiter, Florida. His older brother Ryan is a pro surfer, and both brothers were known as freediving spear-fishermen. He attended Jupiter Community High School.

Helm began his collegiate soccer career at the University of South Florida. He played two years at USF, appearing in 17 matches, notching 3 goals and 7 assists. In 2005, he transferred to Florida Atlantic University, but after only appearing in 4 matches, scoring 2 goals, he was injured for the remainder of the season.

== Professional career ==
Despite his injury-plagued year, Helm was invited to the 2006 Adidas MLS Combine, where his performance earned him the first overall selection in the 2006 MLS Supplemental Draft by Chivas USA, who signed him to a developmental contract. He played sparingly during the 2006 season, making 8 appearances and starting just once. Following the season, he left Chivas to join lower-division Portuguese club Marinhas for the remainder of the 2006/07 season. He joined Swedish club Bodens BK in summer 2008 for a contract spanning the last half of the Swedish season. Helm scored the winning goal for BBK in his debut for the club on August 10, 2008.

In 2010, he returned to Bodens BK during the autumn, and in the last game of the season he scored the goal that secured the club's status as a Division 1 team for 2011.

In 2012, Helm played for the Orlando City's under-23 team, starting the first game of the 2012 season on May 4.

In 2016, Helm signed with the South Florida Surf for the Premier Development League season.
