= Francisco Mendoza (footballer) =

Mexican footballer (born 1985)

Personal information
- Full name: Francisco Juan Mendoza Martínez
- Date of birth: April 29, 1985 (age 41)
- Place of birth: El Salto, Jalisco, Mexico
- Height: 5 ft 5 in (1.65 m)
- Position: Winger

Youth career
- 1999–2005: Guadalajara

Senior career*
| Years | Team | Apps | (Gls) |
| 2005–2008 | Chivas USA | 111 | (5) |
| 2009–2011 | Guadalajara | 3 | (0) |
| 2009 | → Chiapas (loan) | 1 | (0) |
| 2010 | → Tijuana (loan) | 6 | (1) |
| 2010 | → Indios de Ciudad Juárez (loan) | 19 | (4) |
| 2011 | → Chivas USA (loan) | 12 | (0) |
| 2012 | Santos de Guápiles | 6 | (0) |
| 2012–2013 | Universidad de Guadalajara | 12 | (0) |
| 2013–2014 | → Delfines (loan) | 13 | (0) |
| 2014–2015 | Zacatepec | 24 | (1) |
| 2016 | LA Laguna FC | 2 | (1) |
- * Club domestic league appearances and goals as of 15 May 2016

Francisco Juan "Panchito" Mendoza Martínez (born April 29, 1985) is a Mexican former professional footballer who last played for LA Laguna FC

He represented Mexico on its under-17 team for the cycle of the 2001 FIFA tournament.

== Club career ==
=== Chivas USA ===
Mendoza came to C.D. Chivas USA as an import from C.D. Guadalajara's youth system prior to the 2005 MLS season, he was a part of the Chivas system since 1999. "Panchito" Mendoza holds team records for minutes played with 9,423 min. and most games played with 111.

=== Guadalajara ===
Francisco Mendoza was originally sent to C.D. Guadalajara so he could train and keep his football abilities up and going in preparation for the next MLS season. While Mendoza spent more time in Guadalajara head coach Efraín Flores was impressed with Mendoza and decided to keep him with the squad. Mendoza played in the 2009 Interliga with C.D. Guadalajara and fought for a spot in Copa Libertadores. Mendoza played for C.D. Guadalajara in the Interliga and negotiated a deal to remain with Guadalajara. C.D. Guadalajara finished first in their group by a 1–1 tie with Club América, a 3–1 win over F.C. Atlas and a 4–2 win over UANL. C.D. Guadalajara went on to the finals where they tied with Morelia 1–1 and went on to penalties on which they won 4–2 due to a save from Luis Ernesto Michel. On January 14, 2009, it was revealed that Mendoza would most likely not be returning to Chivas USA for the MLS regular season. Instead, he remained with parent club Chivas de Guadalajara. After receiving limited playing time with Guadalajara, Mendoza was loaned to Jaguares for the 2009 Apertura and in 2010 was loaned to Tijuana before finally joining Indios.

=== Return to Chivas USA ===
On March 9, 2011, Mendoza was loaned by Chivas de Guadalajara to Chivas USA. His loaned was terminated by Chivas USA on September 6, 2011.
