= Lawson Vaughn =

American soccer player

Personal information
- Full name: Lawson Vaughn
- Date of birth: April 11, 1984 (age 42)
- Place of birth: Charlotte, North Carolina, United States
- Height: 5 ft 10 in (1.78 m)
- Position: Defender

College career
Years	Team	Apps	(Gls)
2002–2003	South Carolina Gamecocks		
2004–2005	Tulsa Golden Hurricane		

Senior career*
Years	Team	Apps	(Gls)
2006–2009	Chivas USA	48	(1)
2009	D.C. United	3	(0)
Total		51	(1)
- * Club domestic league appearances and goals as of 30 October 2009

Lawson Vaughn (born April 11, 1984, in Charlotte, North Carolina) is a retired American soccer player.

== Career ==
=== College ===
Vaughn attended Lassiter High School in his hometown of Marietta, GA, and began his college soccer career at the University of South Carolina from 2002 to 2003. During his two seasons, he appeared in 34 matches, scoring one goal and providing three assists. In 2004, he transferred to the University of Tulsa, where he subsequently appeared in 43 matches over two seasons, scoring three goals and registering seven assists.

=== Professional ===
Vaughn was selected in the third round, 25th overall, in the 2006 MLS Supplemental Draft by C.D. Chivas USA. He was waived by Chivas USA in August, 2009. He later signed for D.C. United on September 11, 2009, but was released by the club in March 2010.
