= Brent Whitfield =

American soccer player (born 1981)

Personal information
- Full name: Brent Whitfield
- Date of birth: January 8, 1981 (age 45)
- Place of birth: Long Beach, California, United States
- Height: 5 ft 10 in (1.78 m)
- Position: Forward

Team information
- Current team: Ventura County Fusion
- Number: 19

Youth career
- 1999–2003: Fullerton Titans

Senior career*
Years	Team	Apps	(Gls)
2004	Southern California Seahorses		
2005	Seattle Sounders	25	(6)
2006–2007	Chivas USA	11	(1)
2009	Los Angeles Legends	9	(14)
2010	Ventura County Fusion	6	(7)
2010–2011	Hollywood United Hitmen	15	(23)
2012–	Ventura County Fusion	2	(1)

Managerial career
- 2001–2006: Long Beach City College
- 2009: Los Angeles Legends
- * Club domestic league appearances and goals as of May 14, 2012

Brent Whitfield (born January 8, 1981, in Long Beach, California) is an American soccer player currently playing for Ventura County Fusion in the USL Premier Development League.

== Career ==
=== College and amateur ===
Whitfield played college soccer at California State University, Fullerton, in four seasons there he scored 23 goals and registered 9 assists. Undrafted out of college, Whitfield played with the Southern California Seahorses in the USL Premier Development League during the 2004 season.

=== Professional ===
In 2005, Whitfield signed with the USL First Division side, the Seattle Sounders, subsequently playing in 25 games and scoring 6 goals.

Whitfield signed with Chivas USA of Major League Soccer in May 2006, and would go on to play 11 games with the club, scoring 1 goal, before Chivas released him at the end of the 2007 season.

He was hired to be player-head coach of the Los Angeles Legends in the USL Premier Development League for the 2009 season, replacing former head coach Phil Wolf. He scored three back-to-back hat tricks in his first three games for the team - on June 5 in a 6–1 win over Lancaster Rattlers, on June 13 in a 7–1 win over Fresno Fuego, and on June 19 in a 5–0 win over Ogden Outlaws.

In 2010 Whitfield switched to the Ventura County Fusion, and scored a hat trick on his Fusion debut on May 1 in a game against the Lancaster Rattlers.

== Coaching ==
Whitfield was the coach of men's soccer team at Long Beach City College from 2001 to 2006, and was player-coach of the Los Angeles Legends in the USL Premier Development League in 2009.

Brent Whitfield served as assistant coach for the women's soccer team at Cerritos College (in Norwalk, California) from 2013 to 2019, working alongside head coach Ruben Gonzalez. During that period, the team achieved significant success, including a strong overall record (reported as 151-9-9 in some accounts) and multiple conference or state titles.

In 2020, allegations of sexual harassment and inappropriate behavior surfaced against several members of the women's soccer coaching staff, including Whitfield. Former players accused coaches of making unwanted advances, inappropriate comments about players' appearances, sending excessive or suggestive texts, adding players on social media in ways that felt uncomfortable, drinking with players, and pressuring or threatening playing time.
