= Mike Muñoz (soccer) =

American soccer player and coach (born 1983)

Personal information
- Full name: Michael Alejandro Muñoz
- Date of birth: September 14, 1983 (age 43)
- Place of birth: Bellflower, California, United States
- Height: 5 ft 8 in (1.73 m)
- Position: Midfielder

College career
Years	Team	Apps	(Gls)
2001–2004	California Golden Bears		

Senior career*
Years	Team	Apps	(Gls)
2002	Orange County Blue Star		
2005–2006	Chivas USA	1	(0)
2007	California Victory	23	(1)
2008	Hollywood United		
2008–2009	LA Galaxy	1	(0)
2009	Orange County Blue Star	4	(0)

Managerial career
- 2017–2019: LA Galaxy II
- 2020–2021: Toronto FC II
- * Club domestic league appearances and goals as of July 22, 2009

Michael Alejandro Muñoz (born September 14, 1983) is an American soccer coach and former player. He currently works for Major League Soccer club LA Galaxy as the Director of Methodology and Development, overseeing all LA Galaxy Academy decisions.

== Playing career ==
=== College and amateur ===
Muñoz attended Los Alamitos High School playing for the soccer team. In 2001, a talent scout set up a tryout for him with the San Jose Earthquakes and arranged offers for tryouts with professional club teams in Sweden and Norway. After a one-day tryout with the Earthquakes, was offered a contract, but did not sign, deciding to finish out his high school season.

He played college soccer at the University of California, Berkeley. In his first three seasons he started 60 out of 63 matches. As a freshman he garnered 2nd Team All Pac-10 and 3rd Team All-West Region honors, and in his sophomore and junior year he notched First Team All-Pac-10 and 2nd Team All West-Region. He was also a two-year captain for the Golden Bears his junior and senior year. However, four games into his senior season he tore his right MCL and was out for the rest of the year. In 2002, Muñoz was offered a two-year contract deal in Norway from Fredrikstad FC, but chose not to sign.

During his college years he also played for Orange County Blue Star in the USL Premier Development League.

=== Professional ===
Muñoz was selected in the third round of the 2005 MLS Supplemental Draft by Chivas USA. He made his professional debut on August 13 against D.C. United. In September 2006 he underwent arthroscopic ankle surgery, which sidelined him for the rest of the season, having appeared in just one game. He was waived by the club at the end of the 2006 season, after having suffered an ankle injury during the season.

After leaving Chivas, Muñoz signed with the California Victory of the USL First Division. He scored the first league goal in Victory history on April 28, 2007, against the Vancouver Whitecaps FC. The goal was awarded Goal Of The Week honors, and saw him named part of the USL First Division Team Of The Week on April 30, 2007. Muñoz left the Victory when the team folded at the end of the 2007 season. After the season, his girlfriend, Patty Rodriguez, started a petition trying to get Chivas to sign him again, with the petition gaining the support of television and radio personality Ryan Seacrest, for whom Rodriguez worked as an assistant producer on On Air with Ryan Seacrest.

Ahead of the 2008 season, he had trials with Chivas, the San Jose Earthquakes, as well as in Puerto Rico and Seattle. After a short stint with Los Angeles-based amateur team Hollywood United, who he helped qualify for the Lamar Hunt US Open Cup for the first time in 2008, and having played several games for the LA Galaxy's reserves, Munoz was signed to a contract with LA Galaxy on August 1, 2008. He made his first team debut with the Galaxy on September 6, 2008, coming on as a second-half substitute against Real Salt Lake.

In 2009, he played with the Orange County Blue Star in the Premier Development League. Later that year, he decided to retire from the sport.

=== International ===
In 2002, Muñoz was part of the United States U20 team under head coach Thomas Rongen.

== Coaching career ==
Muñoz returned to his alma mater to become an assistant coach with the UC Berkeley men's soccer team during their fall season of 2007. In 2009, Muñoz joined his old club, the LA Galaxy, as an assistant coach of the U16 team.

Following his retirement, he helped establish the Real Salt Lake Arizona Academy with Greg Vanney and became the coach of the U16 team, where he was named US Development Academy U16 Coach of the Year.

In 2011, he joined Chivas USA along with Vanney and Robin Fraser, where he served as an assistant coach of the first team in Major League Soccer for two years and also served as head coach of the U16 and assistant with the U18 and U23 teams.

He also served on the United States U14 and U15 national team coaching staffs.

In 2013, he joined the LA Galaxy Academy, coaching the U14 and U16 teams. In 2013–2014, he won the U.S. Soccer Development Academy (USSDA) national title with the U16s. Eventually, he was named the team's Academy Director. In January 2017, he was named head coach of the second team LA Galaxy II in the second tier USL He was fired by the team in July 2019.

In December 2018, he earned his U.S. Soccer Pro License.

On January 27, 2020, he was named head coach of Toronto FC II in USL League One. Toronto FC II was unable to play the 2020 season due to restrictions with border travel that forced them to opt out of the 2020 USL League One season. They returned to the league in 2021, finishing with a 10-10-8 under Muñoz, missing out on the playoffs on the final matchday of the season.

In January 2022, he returned to the Galaxy as Director of Methodology and Development, where he will oversee all LA Galaxy Academy decisions.

== Coaching statistics ==
As of December 31, 2021

Coaching record by team and tenure
Team	League	From	To	Record				
Team	League	From	To	G	W	D	L	Win %
(United States) LA Galaxy II	USL Championship	January 12, 2017	July 19, 2019	85	23	20	42	27.06
(Canada) Toronto FC II	USL League One	January 27, 2020	December 31, 2021	28	10	10	8	35.71
Total				113	33	30	50	29.20
