= 2010 Chivas USA season =

Chivas USA
2010 season
- Owner: Jorge Vergara
- Manager: Martín Vásquez
- MLS: Conference: 8th Overall: 15th
- MLS Cup Playoffs: DNQ
- U.S. Open Cup: Semifinal vs Seattle Sounders FC
- California SuperClásico: Loss (0-0-2)
- Top goalscorer: League: Justin Braun (9); All: Justin Braun (11)
Home colors	Away colors

The 2010 Chivas USA season was the sixth season of the team's existence.

== Transfers ==
=== In ===
Date	Number	Position	Player	Previous club	Fee/notes	Ref
January 14, 2010	18	MF	(United States) Blair Gavin	Akron Zips	SuperDraft Round one	
January 14, 2010		DF	(United States) Kevin Tangney	Maryland Terrapins	SuperDraft Round three	
January 14, 2010		MF	(Ghana) Isaac Kissi	Dayton Flyers	SuperDraft Round three	
January 14, 2010	21	MF	(United States) Ben Zemanski	Akron Zips	SuperDraft Round three	
January 14, 2010		MF	(United States) Chris Ross	Colgate Raiders	SuperDraft Round four	
February 1, 2010	7	MF	(El Salvador) Osael Romero	(El Salvador) Vista Hermosa	Loan	
March 12, 2010	4	DF	(Costa Rica) Michael Umaña	(Costa Rica) Municipal Liberia	Undisclosed	
March 25, 2010	23	DF	(United States) Carlos Borja	(Mexico) Tapatio	Free	
April 4, 2010	12	DF	(Costa Rica) Darío Delgado	(Costa Rica) Puntarenas	Loan	
April 30, 2010	15	MF	(Costa Rica) José Macotelo	(Costa Rica) Puntarenas	Loan	
June 4, 2010	33	DF	(Romania) Alex Zotincă	Unattached	Free	
June 25, 2010	26	MF	(Brazil) Paulo Nagamura	(Mexico) Tigres UANL	Undisclosed	
July 8, 2010	20	FW	(Venezuela) Giancarlo Maldonado	(Mexico) Atlante	Loan	
July 14, 2010	24	MF	(Mexico) Rodolfo Espinoza	(Peru) Universitario	Undisclosed	
July 21, 2010	15	MF	(United States) Sal Zizzo	(Germany) Hannover 96	Lottery	
August 25, 2010	59	MF	(United States) Bryan de la Fuente	Chivas USA U-18	Promoted	
August 2010	16	FW	(United States) Alan Gordon	LA Galaxy	Trade	
	32	GK	(United States) Kevin Guppy			

=== Out ===
Date	Number	Position	Player	New club	Fee/notes	Ref
November 25, 2009	4	DF	(Jamaica) Shavar Thomas	(United States) Philadelphia Union	Expansion Draft	
	9	FW	(United States) Ante Razov	Retired		
January 14, 2010	5	MF	(Brazil) Paulo Nagamura	(Mexico) Tigres UANL		
January 21, 2010	7	MF	(Canada) Kevin Harmse	Houston Dynamo	Trade	
January 26, 2010	3	DF	(United States) Jim Curtin		Waived	
January 26, 2010	23	MF	(Serbia) Bojan Stepanović	(Slovenia) Drava Ptuj	Waived	
January 8, 2010	99	FW	(Mexico) Eduardo Lillingston	(Mexico) Tijuana	Loan	
February 5, 2010	15	MF	(United States) Jesse Marsch	Retired		
March 19, 2010	21	GK	(United States) Lance Parker	Miami F.C.		
March 25, 2010	12	MF	(United States) Carey Talley	D.C. United	Released	
March 26, 2010	2	DF	(Mexico) Claudio Suárez	Retired		
March 2010	18	MF	(United States) Sasha Victorine	Retired		
June 10, 2010	16	MF	(United States) Sacha Kljestan	(Belgium) Anderlecht	Undisclosed	
July 1, 2010	15	MF	(Costa Rica) José Macotelo	(Costa Rica) Puntarenas	Loan Return	
July 1, 2010	29	FW	(Brazil) Maicon	(Brazil) Bonsucesso	Loan Return	
July 20, 2010	99	FW	(Mexico) Eduardo Lillingston	(Mexico) UACJ	Loan	
August 6, 2010	14	MF	(United States) Gerson Mayen	(United States) Miami FC	Loan	
August 6, 2010	77	FW	(United States) Chukwudi Chijindu	(United States) Miami FC	Loan	
	7	MF	(El Salvador) Osael Romero	(El Salvador) Vista Hermosa	Loan Return	
	9	FW	(Cuba) Maykel Galindo	(United States) Tampa Bay	Loan	

== Roster ==
No.	Name	Nationality	Position	Date of birth (age)	Signed from	Signed in	Contract ends	Apps.	Goals
Goalkeepers
1	Dan Kennedy	(United States)	GK	July 22, 1982 (aged 28)	(Chile) Municipal Iquique	2008		10	0
22	Zach Thornton	(United States)	GK	October 10, 1973 (aged 37)	New York Red Bulls	2008		39	0
32	Kevin Guppy	(United States)	GK	January 29, 1987 (aged 23)		2010			
Defenders
4	Michael Umaña	(Costa Rica)	DF	July 16, 1982 (aged 28)	(Costa Rica) Municipal Liberia	2010			
6	Ante Jazić	(Canada)	DF	February 26, 1976 (aged 34)	LA Galaxy	2009		14	0
12	Darío Delgado	(Costa Rica)	DF	December 14, 1985 (aged 24)	loan from (Costa Rica) Puntarenas	2010			
13	Jonathan Bornstein	(United States)	DF	November 7, 1984 (aged 25)	UCLA Bruin	2006			
23	Carlos Borja	(United States)	DF	January 18, 1988 (aged 22)	(Mexico) Tapatio	2010			
33	Alex Zotincă	(Romania)	DF	January 22, 1977 (aged 33)	Kansas City Wizards	2010		30	0
45	Yamith Cuesta	(Colombia)	DF	April 17, 1989 (aged 21)	loan from (Colombia) Expreso Rojo	2009	2010	11	0
Midfielders
5	Marcelo Saragosa	(Brazil)	MF	January 22, 1982 (aged 28)	FC Dallas	2009		9	0
8	Mariano Trujillo	(Mexico)	MF	May 19, 1977 (aged 33)	(Mexico) Atlante	2009		21	0
11	Michael Lahoud	(Sierra Leone)	MF	September 15, 1986 (aged 24)	Carolina Dynamo	2009		19	1
15	Sal Zizzo	(United States)	MF	April 2, 1987 (aged 23)	(Germany) Hannover 96	2010			
18	Blair Gavin	(United States)	MF	January 8, 1989 (aged 21)	Academy Bradenton	2010			
19	Jorge Flores	(United States)	MF	September 16, 1989 (aged 21)	Chivas USA Academy	2007		24	3
21	Ben Zemanski	(United States)	MF	May 12, 1988 (aged 22)	Cleveland Internationals	2010			
24	Rodolfo Espinoza	(Mexico)	MF	June 14, 1988 (aged 22)	(Peru) Universitario	2010			
26	Paulo Nagamura	(Brazil)	MF	March 2, 1983 (aged 27)	(Mexico) Tigres UANL	2010		83	8
28	César Zamora	(United States)	MF	May 27, 1991 (aged 19)	Chivas USA Academy	2009		0	0
59	Bryan de la Fuente	(United States)	MF	July 1, 1992 (aged 18)	Chivas USA Academy	2010		0	0
Forwards
9	Maykel Galindo	(Cuba)	FW	January 28, 1981 (aged 29)	Seattle Sounders	2007		65	18
10	Jesús Padilla	(Mexico)	FW	May 3, 1987 (aged 23)	loan from (Mexico) Guadalajara	2009	2010	13	1
16	Alan Gordon	(United States)	FW	March 31, 1987 (aged 23)	LA Galaxy	2010			
17	Justin Braun	(United States)	FW	March 31, 1987 (aged 23)	Olympique Montreux	2008		45	8
20	Giancarlo Maldonado	(Venezuela)	FW	June 29, 1982 (aged 28)	loan from (Mexico) Atlante	2010			
77	Chukwudi Chijindu	(United States)	FW	February 20, 1986 (aged 24)	Connecticut Huskies	2009		12	1
Away on loan
9	Maykel Galindo	(Cuba)	FW	January 28, 1981 (aged 29)	Seattle Sounders	2007		65	18
14	Gerson Mayen	(United States)	MF	February 9, 1989 (aged 21)	Chivas USA Academy	2008		12	0
77	Chukwudi Chijindu	(United States)	FW	February 20, 1986 (aged 24)	Connecticut Huskies	2009		12	1
Left Chivas USA
7	Osael Romero	(El Salvador)	MF	April 18, 1986 (aged 24)	loan return (El Salvador) Vista Hermosa	2010			
15	José Macotelo	(Costa Rica)	MF	July 12, 1985 (aged 25)	(Costa Rica) Puntarenas	2010	2010		
16	Sacha Kljestan	(United States)	MF	September 9, 1985 (aged 25)	(Belgium) Anderlecht	2006			
29	Maicon	(Brazil)	FW	April 18, 1984 (aged 26)	(Brazil) Bonsucesso	2009	2010	12	2

== North American SuperLiga ==
Team	Pld	W	D	L	GF	GA	GD	Pts
(United States) Houston Dynamo	3	2	1	0	4	2	+2	7
(Mexico) Puebla	3	2	0	1	5	3	+2	6
(United States) Chivas USA	3	1	1	1	3	3	0	4
(Mexico) Pachuca	3	0	0	3	2	6	−4	0

July 15, 2010 1	Chivas USA (United States)	1–2	(Mexico) Puebla	Carson
19:00 PST	Umaña 85'	[ Report]	Olivera 6'; González 62'	Stadium: The Home Depot Center; Attendance: 12,617; Referee: José Gaspar Molina (Honduras)

June 23, 2009 2	Houston Dynamo (United States)	1–1	(United States) Chivas USA	Houston
17:00 PST	Palmer 6'	[ Report]	Padilla 71'	Stadium: Robertson Stadium; Attendance: 5,007

July 21, 2010 3	Chivas USA (United States)	1–0	(Mexico) Pachuca	Carson
19:30 PST	Maldonado 7'	[ Report]		Stadium: The Home Depot Center; Attendance: 14,817; Referee: Marlon Mejia (El Salvador)

== Competitions ==
=== MLS ===
==== League table ====
Pos	Team	Pld	W	L	T	GF	GA	GD	Pts	Qualification
1	LA Galaxy	30	18	7	5	44	26	+18	59	MLS Cup Playoffs
2	Real Salt Lake	30	15	4	11	45	20	+25	56	MLS Cup Playoffs
3	FC Dallas	30	12	4	14	42	28	+14	50	MLS Cup Playoffs
4	Seattle Sounders FC	30	14	10	6	39	35	+4	48	MLS Cup Playoffs
5	Colorado Rapids	30	12	8	10	44	32	+12	46	MLS Cup Playoffs
6	San Jose Earthquakes	30	13	10	7	34	33	+1	46	MLS Cup Playoffs
7	Houston Dynamo	30	9	15	6	40	49	−9	33	
8	Chivas USA	30	8	18	4	31	45	−14	28	

Source: MLS

Pos	Team	Pld	W	L	T	GF	GA	GD	Pts	Qualification
1	LA Galaxy (S)	30	18	7	5	44	26	+18	59	CONCACAF Champions League
2	Real Salt Lake	30	15	4	11	45	20	+25	56	
3	New York Red Bulls	30	15	9	6	38	29	+9	51	
4	FC Dallas	30	12	4	14	42	28	+14	50	CONCACAF Champions League
5	Columbus Crew	30	14	8	8	40	34	+6	50	
6	Seattle Sounders FC	30	14	10	6	39	35	+4	48	CONCACAF Champions League
7	Colorado Rapids (C)	30	12	8	10	44	32	+12	46	CONCACAF Champions League
8	San Jose Earthquakes	30	13	10	7	34	33	+1	46	
9	Kansas City Wizards	30	11	13	6	36	35	+1	39	
10	Chicago Fire	30	9	12	9	37	38	−1	36	
11	Toronto FC	30	9	13	8	33	41	−8	35	CONCACAF Champions League
12	Houston Dynamo	30	9	15	6	40	49	−9	33	
13	New England Revolution	30	9	16	5	32	50	−18	32	
14	Philadelphia Union	30	8	15	7	35	49	−14	31	
15	Chivas USA	30	8	18	4	31	45	−14	28	
16	D.C. United	30	6	20	4	21	47	−26	22	

Source: MLS
Rules for classification: 1) points; 2) head-to-head record; 3) goal difference; 4) number of goals scored
(C) Champions; (S) Supporters' Shield

==== Results summary ====
Overall								Home						Away					
Pld	Pts	W	L	T	GF	GA	GD	W	L	T	GF	GA	GD	W	L	T	GF	GA	GD
0	0	0	0	0	0	0	0	0	0	0	0	0	0	0	0	0	0	0	0

Last updated: October 25, 2009
Source: Major League Soccer
Pld = Matches played; Pts = Points; W = Matches won; T = Matches tied; L = Matches lost; GF = Goals for; GA = Goals against; GD = Goal difference

Round	1	2	3	4	5	6	7	8	9	10	11	12	13	14	15	16	17	18	19	20	21	22	23	24	25	26	27	28	29	30
Stadium																														
Result																														

Source: Chivas USA
A = Away; H = Home; W = Win; L = Loss; T = Tie

==== Results ====
March 27, 2010 1	Chivas USA	0–1	Colorado Rapids	Carson
19:30 PST	Romero (yellow card) 37'	Report	Larentowicz (yellow card) 48'; Cummings 55'	Stadium: The Home Depot Center; Attendance: 18,653; Referee: Michael Kennedy

April 1, 2010 2	LA Galaxy	2–0	Chivas USA	Carson
20:00 PST	Buddle 7', 86'; Birchall (yellow card) 25'; Stephens (yellow card) 90'	Report	Umaña (yellow card) 18'	Stadium: The Home Depot Center; Attendance: 19,805; Referee: Ricardo Salazar

April 10, 2010 3	Chivas USA	2–0	New York Red Bulls	Carson
16:00 PST	Coundol 47' (o.g.); Padilla (yellow card) 89' (goal) 90+1'	Report	Petke (yellow card) 18'	Stadium: The Home Depot Center; Attendance: 12,597; Referee: Paul Ward

April 17, 2010 4	Houston Dynamo	3–0	Chivas USA	Houston
16:00 PST	Cameron 12'; Palmer 20' (yellow card) 55'; Oduro 64'	Report		Stadium: Robertson Stadium; Attendance: 14,843; Referee: Hilario Grajeda

April 24, 2010 5	Chivas USA	3–2	San Jose Earthquakes	Carson
19:30 PST	Kljestan 25'; Trujillo (yellow card) 35'; Braun 54'; Borja (yellow card) 82'; Chijindu 87'	Report	Wondolowski 41' (yellow card) 73'; Jasseh (yellow card) 66'; Beitashour 90+3'	Stadium: The Home Depot Center; Attendance: 14,389; Referee: Edvin Jurisevic

May 1, 2010 6	Chicago Fire	1–1	Chivas USA	Bridgeview
20:30 PST	Husidić 52'	Report	Dealgado (yellow card) 67'; Santos 76'	Stadium: Toyota Park; Attendance: 13,224; Referee: Jason Anno

May 5, 2010 7	New England Revolution	0–4	Chivas USA	Foxborough
19:30 PST	Perović (red card) 28'; Jankauskas (yellow card) 86'	Report	Padilla 26', 48'; Zemanski (yellow card) 28'; Braun 33'; Gavin 80'	Stadium: Gillette Stadium; Attendance: 5,990; Referee: Steven DePiero

May 8, 2010 8	Chivas USA	0–2	Houston Dynamo	Carson
19:30 PST	Trujillo (yellow card) 35'	Report	Davis 3'; Serioux 8'; Chabala (yellow card) 42'	Stadium: The Home Depot Center; Attendance: 12,577; Referee: Abbey Okulaja

May 15, 2010 9	Columbus Crew	1–0	Chivas USA	Columbus
16:30 PST	Hejduk (yellow card) 55'; Schelotto 90' (pen.)	Report	Umaña (yellow card) 15'; Padilla (yellow card) 60'; Zemanski (yellow card) 77'	Stadium: Crew Stadium; Attendance: 15,027; Referee: Jeff Gontarek

May 22, 2010 10	Chivas USA	1–2	Real Salt Lake	Carson
19:30 PST	Saragosa (yellow card) 26'; Braun 80'	Report	Williams (yellow card) 39'; Wingert 45+1'; Alexandre (yellow card) 66'; Espíndola 89'	Stadium: The Home Depot Center; Attendance: 14,287; Referee: Yader Reyes

May 29, 2010 11	D.C. United	3–2	Chivas USA	Washington, D.C.
19:30 PST	Najar 26'; Cristman 76'; King (yellow card) 87'; Talley 90+2' (pen.)	Report	Braun 17'; Trujilo (yellow card) 78'; Galindo 80'; Thornton (red card) 90'	Stadium: RFK Stadium; Attendance: 13,043; Referee: Jasen Anno

June 5, 2010 12	New York Red Bulls	1–0	Chivas USA	Harrison
19:30 PST	Stammler 27'	Report	Delgado (yellow card) 73'; Romero (yellow card) 74'	Stadium: Red Bull Arena; Attendance: 18,815; Referee: Terry Vaughn

June 26, 2010 13	Chivas USA	1–2	FC Dallas	Carson
19:30 PST	Lahoud (yellow card) 1'; Romero 59'	Report	Jazić 45' (o.g.); Ferreira 61'; Guarda (yellow card) 71'	Stadium: The Home Depot Center; Attendance: 14,173; Referee: Abbey Okulaja

July 3, 2010 14	Chivas USA	1–1	Philadelphia Union	Carson
19:30 PST	Trujillo (yellow card) 27'; Braun (yellow card) 31'; Gavin 42'; Jazić (yellow card) 82'	Report	Mwanga 21'; Torres (yellow card) 38'; Orozco (yellow card) 57'	Stadium: The Home Depot Center; Attendance: 14,479; Referee: Edvin Jurisevic

July 10, 2010 15	Kansas City Wizards	0–2	Chivas USA	Kansas City
18:30 PST	Conrad (yellow card) 81'	Report	Braun 56', 87'; Romero (yellow card) 74'	Stadium: CommunityAmerica Ballpark; Attendance: 10,288; Referee: Hilario Grajeda

July 24, 2010 16	Real Salt Lake	1–1	Chivas USA	Sandy
19:00 PST	Beckerman (yellow card) 51'; Grabavoy 66'; Saborío (yellow card) 82'	Report	Espinoza (yellow card) 28'; Trujillo (yellow card) 54'; Padilla 70'; Kennedy (yellow card) 78'	Stadium: Rio Tinto Stadium; Attendance: 19,469; Referee: Mark Geiger

July 31, 2010 17	Chivas USA	3–1	Columbus Crew	Carson
19:30 PST	Braun 37'; Gavin 45'; Borja 53'	Report	Francis (yellow card) 85'; Lenhart 88'	Stadium: The Home Depot Center; Attendance: 13,419; Referee: Hilario Grajeda

August 7, 2010 18	Toronto	2–1	Chivas USA	Toronto
13:00 PST	Gargan (yellow card) 17'; Attakora 21'; Barrett 32'	Report	Jazić (yellow card) 14'; Maldonado 65' (pen.)	Stadium: BMO Field; Attendance: 20,648; Referee: Jorge Gonzalez

August 14, 2010 19	Chivas USA	0–0	Seattle Sounders FC	Carson
20:00 PST	Trujillo (red card) 90+1'	Report	Parke (yellow card) 89'; González (red card) 90+1'	Stadium: The Home Depot Center; Attendance: 13,839; Referee: Alex Prus

August 21, 2010 20	FC Dallas	1–0	Chivas USA	Frisco
17:30 PST	Harris (yellow card) 34'; Shea 71'; Hernández (yellow card) 79'	Report	Padilla (yellow card) 79'; Nagamura (yellow card) 89'	Stadium: Pizza Hut Park; Attendance: 10,309; Referee: Paul Ward

August 29, 2010 21	Chivas USA	1–0	D.C. United	Carson
19:00 PST	Braun 13' (yellow card) 73'; Saragosa (yellow card) 72'	Report	Najar (yellow card) 84'	Stadium: The Home Depot Center; Attendance: 12,517; Referee: Kevin Stott

September 4, 2010 22	Colorado Rapids	3–0	Chivas USA	Commerce City
18:00 PST	Casey 51'; Cummings 68', 80'	Report	Gordon (yellow card) 39'; Cuesta (yellow card) 60'	Stadium: Dick's Sporting Goods Park; Attendance: 10,312; Referee: Michael Kennedy

September 10, 2010 23	Chivas USA	2–0	New England Revolution	Carson
19:30 PST	Braun 6'; Nagamura 36'; Umaña (yellow card) 86'	Report		Stadium: The Home Depot Center; Attendance: 10,783; Referee: Abbey Okulaja

September 19, 2010 24	Chivas USA	0–2	Kansas City Wizards	Carson
17:00 PST	Trujillo (yellow card) 54'; Umaña (yellow card) 75'	Report	Kamara 70'; Bunbury 83'	Stadium: The Home Depot Center; Attendance: 15,382; Referee: Kevin Stott

September 25, 2010 25	Philadelphia Union	3–0	Chivas USA	Chester
13:00 PST	Moreno 25'; Mapp (yellow card) 44'; Fred 45'; Le Toux 69'	Report	Trujillo (yellow card) 45'; Umaña (yellow card) 67'; Nagamura (yellow card) 85'	Stadium: PPL Park; Attendance: 16,481; Referee: Mark Geiger

October 3, 2010 26	Chivas USA	1–2	LA Galaxy	Carson
17:00 PST	Borja (yellow card) 38'; Gordon 63'; Espinoza (yellow card) 79'	Report	Buddle 23'; Beckham 39'; Lewis (red card) 76'; Stephens (yellow card) 89'	Stadium: The Home Depot Center; Attendance: 24,283; Referee: Jair Marrufo

October 9, 2010 27	Chivas USA	3–0	Toronto	Carson
19:30 PST	Flores 51'; Gordon (yellow card) 74'; Padilla 88'; Espinoza 90'	Report	De Rosario (yellow card) 81'	Stadium: The Home Depot Center; Attendance: 12,426; Referee: Terry Vaughan

October 15, 2010 28	Seattle Sounders FC	2–1	Chivas USA	Seattle
20:00 PST	Zakuani 9' (yellow card) 58'; Alonso 25'; Montero (yellow card) 83'	Report	Nagamura (yellow card) 26'; Padilla 90'	Stadium: Qwest Field; Attendance: 36,356; Referee: Edvin Jurisevic

October 20, 2010 29	San Jose Earthquakes	3–0	Chivas USA	Santa Clara
19:00 PST	Burling (yellow card) 28'; Wondolowski 55' (pen.), 59', 72'	Report	Umana (yellow card) 29'	Stadium: Buck Shaw Stadium; Attendance: 9,633; Referee: Ricardo Salazar

October 23, 2010 30	Chivas USA	1–4	Chicago Fire	Carson
20:00 PST	Maldonado 57'; Espinoza (yellow card) 72'	Report	McBride 40'; Ljungberg 47' (yellow card) 72'; Carr 68'; Husidić 90'	Stadium: The Home Depot Center; Attendance: 14,825; Referee: Paul Ward

=== U.S. Open Cup ===
June 29, 2010 Third round	Chivas USA	1–0	Austin Aztex	Fullerton
19:30 PST	Padilla 13'	[ Report]	Needham (yellow card) 25'	Stadium: Fullerton State Sports Complex; Referee: Josh Wilkens

July 6, 2010 Quarterfinal	Houston Dynamo	1–3	Chivas USA	Houston
19:30 PST	Robinson (yellow card) 54'; Oduro 86'; Waibel (yellow card) 90+3'; Cruz (yellow card) 90+3'	Report	Braun 5', 90'; Lahoud 65'; Padilla (yellow card) 68'; Mayen (yellow card) 90+5'	Stadium: Robertson Stadium; Attendance: 1,097; Referee: Daniel Fitzgerald

September 1, 2010 Semifinal	Seattle Sounders FC	3–1	Chivas USA	Tukwila
19:30 PST	Jaqua 10', 90+2'; Montero 59'; Alonso (yellow card) 79'	Report	Nagamura (yellow card) 51'; Padilla 66'	Stadium: Starfire Sports Complex; Attendance: 4,547; Referee: Ricardo Salazar

== Statistics ==
As of Match played October 23, 2010

=== Appearances and goals ===
No.	Pos	Nat	Player	Total		MLS		U.S. Open Cup	
No.	Pos	Nat	Player	Apps	Goals	Apps	Goals	Apps	Goals
1	GK	(United States) USA	Dan Kennedy	7	0	6+1	0	0	0
4	DF	(Costa Rica) CRC	Michael Umaña	28	0	28	0	0	0
5	MF	(Brazil) BRA	Marcelo Saragosa	14	0	9+5	0	0	0
6	DF	(Canada) CAN	Ante Jazić	21	0	21	0	0	0
8	MF	(Mexico) MEX	Mariano Trujillo	28	0	28	0	0	0
10	FW	(Mexico) MEX	Jesús Padilla	26	6	14+12	6	0	0
11	MF	(Sierra Leone) SLE	Michael Lahoud	24	0	21+3	0	0	0
12	DF	(Costa Rica) CRC	Darío Delgado	22	0	21+1	0	0	0
13	DF	(United States) USA	Jonathan Bornstein	21	0	17+4	0	0	0
15	MF	(United States) USA	Sal Zizzo	10	0	1+9	0	0	0
16	FW	(United States) USA	Alan Gordon	8	1	7+1	1	0	0
17	FW	(United States) USA	Justin Braun	28	9	24+4	9	0	0
18	MF	(United States) USA	Blair Gavin	16	3	16	3	0	0
19	MF	(United States) USA	Jorge Flores	8	1	6+2	1	0	0
20	FW	(Venezuela) VEN	Giancarlo Maldonado	10	2	7+3	2	0	0
21	MF	(United States) USA	Ben Zemanski	22	0	17+5	0	0	0
22	GK	(United States) USA	Zach Thornton	23	0	23	0	0	0
23	DF	(United States) USA	Carlos Borja	8	1	4+4	1	0	0
24	MF	(Mexico) MEX	Rodolfo Espinoza	15	1	14+1	1	0	0
26	MF	(Brazil) BRA	Paulo Nagamura	15	1	15	1	0	0
32	GK	(United States) USA	Kevin Guppy	1	0	1	0	0	0
33	DF	(Romania) ROU	Alex Zotincă	1	0	1	0	0	0
45	DF	(Colombia) COL	Yamith Cuesta	6	0	3+3	0	0	0
59	MF	(United States) USA	Bryan de la Fuente	1	0	0+1	0	0	0
Players away from Chivas USA on loan:
9	FW	(Cuba) CUB	Maykel Galindo	5	1	3+2	1	0	0
77	FW	(United States) USA	Chukwudi Chijindu	12	1	2+10	1	0	0
14	MF	(United States) USA	Gerson Mayen	4	0	2+2	0	0	0
Players who left Chivas USA during the season:
7	MF	(El Salvador) SLV	Osael Romero	9	1	5+4	1	0	0
15	MF	(Costa Rica) CRC	José Macotelo	3	0	0+3	0	0	0
16	MF	(United States) USA	Sacha Kljestan	11	1	11	1	0	0
29	FW	(Brazil) BRA	Maicon	9	1	3+6	1	0	0

=== Goal scorers ===
Place	Position	Nation	Number	Name	MLS	U.S. Open Cup	Total
1	FW	(United States)	17	Justin Braun	9	2	11
2	FW	(Mexico)	10	Jesús Padilla	6	2	8
3	MF	(United States)	18	Blair Gavin	3	0	3
4	FW	(Venezuela)	20	Giancarlo Maldonado	2	0	2
5	MF	(United States)	16	Sacha Kljestan	1	0	1
5	FW	(United States)	77	Chukwudi Chijindu	1	0	1
5	FW	(Brazil)	29	Maicon	1	0	1
5	FW	(Cuba)	9	Maykel Galindo	1	0	1
5	MF	(El Salvador)	7	Osael Romero	1	0	1
5	DF	(United States)	23	Carlos Borja	1	0	1
5	MF	(Brazil)	26	Paulo Nagamura	1	0	1
5	FW	(United States)	16	Alan Gordon	1	0	1
5	MF	(United States)	19	Jorge Flores	1	0	1
5	MF	(Mexico)	24	Rodolfo Espinoza	1	0	1
5				Own goal	1	0	1
5	MF	(Sierra Leone)	11	Michael Lahoud	0	1	1
				TOTALS	31	5	36

=== Disciplinary record ===
Number	Nation	Position	Name	MLS		U.S. Open Cup		Total	
Number	Nation	Position	Name	Booked	Sent off (straight red)	Booked	Sent off (straight red)	Booked	Sent off (straight red)
1	(United States)	GK	Dan Kennedy	1	0	0	0	1	0
4	(Costa Rica)	DF	Michael Umaña	6	0	0	0	6	0
5	(Brazil)	MF	Marcelo Saragosa	2	0	0	0	2	0
6	(Canada)	DF	Ante Jazić	2	0	0	0	2	0
7	(El Salvador)	MF	Osael Romero	3	0	0	0	3	0
8	(Mexico)	MF	Mariano Trujillo	7	1	0	0	7	1
10	(Mexico)	FW	Jesús Padilla	3	0	1	0	4	0
11	(Sierra Leone)	MF	Michael Lahoud	1	0	1	0	2	0
12	(Costa Rica)	DF	Darío Delgado	2	0	0	0	2	0
14	(United States)	MF	Gerson Mayen	0	0	1	0	1	0
16	(United States)	FW	Alan Gordon	2	0	0	0	2	0
17	(United States)	FW	Justin Braun	2	0	0	0	2	0
21	(United States)	MF	Ben Zemanski	2	0	0	0	2	0
22	(United States)	GK	Zach Thornton	0	1	0	0	0	1
23	(United States)	DF	Carlos Borja	2	0	0	0	2	0
24	(Mexico)	MF	Rodolfo Espinoza	3	0	0	0	3	0
26	(Brazil)	MF	Paulo Nagamura	3	0	1	0	4	0
45	(Colombia)	DF	Yamith Cuesta	1	0	0	0	1	0
			TOTALS	42	2	4	0	46	2
