= 2011 Chivas USA season =

Chivas USA
2011 season
- Owner: Jorge Vergara
- Coach: Robin Fraser
- Stadium: Home Depot Center
- Major League Soccer: Conference: 8th Overall: 15th
- MLS Cup Playoffs: DNQ
- U.S. Open Cup: Play-In Round vs Portland Timbers
- California SuperClásico: Loss (0-0-2)
- Top goalscorer: League: Two Players (8); All: Two Players (8)
- Average home league attendance: 14,830
Home colors	Away colors

The 2011 Chivas USA season was the club's seventh year of existence, as well as their seventh season in Major League Soccer, and their seventh consecutive season in the top-flight of American soccer.

== Overview ==
=== February ===
Chivas USA signed New Zealand internationals Andrew Boyens and Simon Elliott on February 9. Six days later the club acquired U.S. defender Heath Pearce from FC Dallas in exchange for allocation money.

=== Allocation ranking ===
Chivas USA is in the #1 position in the MLS Allocation Ranking. The allocation ranking is the mechanism used to determine which MLS club has first priority to acquire a U.S. National Team player who signs with MLS after playing abroad, or a former MLS player who returns to the league after having gone to a club abroad for a transfer fee. A ranking can be traded, provided that part of the compensation received in return is another club's ranking.

=== International roster spots ===
It is believed that Chivas USA possesses 8 international roster spots. Each club in Major League Soccer is allocated 8 international roster spots, which can be traded. Chivas USA dealt one slot to Vancouver Whitecaps on November 24, 2010, for use in the 2011 season. The club also permanently acquired one spot in a trade with Real Salt Lake on November 24, 2004. There is no limit on the number of international slots on each club's roster. The remaining roster slots must belong to domestic players. For clubs based in the United States, a domestic player is either a U.S. citizen, a permanent resident (green card holder) or the holder of other special status (e.g., refugee or asylum status).

== Transfers ==
=== In ===
Date	Player	Position	Previous club	Fee/notes	Ref
November 24, 2010	(United States) Alan Gordon	FW	(Canada) Vancouver Whitecaps	Undisclosed Allocation Money and 2011 International Roster Spot	
November 24, 2010	(Venezuela) Alejandro Moreno	FW	(Canada) Vancouver Whitecaps	Undisclosed Allocation Money and 2011 International Roster Spot	
December 15, 2010	(United States) Jimmy Conrad	DF	(United States) Sporting Kansas City	Re-Entry Draft	
December 15, 2010	(United States) Tristan Bowen	FW	(United States) Los Angeles Galaxy	Acquired for allocation money	
January 13, 2011	(United States) Zarek Valentin	DF	(United States) University of Akron	SuperDraft, 1st round	
January 13, 2011	(Ecuador) Víctor Estupiñán	FW	(Ecuador) LDU Quito	SuperDraft, 1st round	
February 9, 2011	(New Zealand) Andrew Boyens	DF	(United States) New York Red Bulls	Free	
February 9, 2011	(New Zealand) Simon Elliott	MF	(New Zealand) Wellington Phoenix FC	Free	
February 15, 2011	(United States) Heath Pearce	DF	(United States) FC Dallas	Acquired for allocation money	
March 1, 2011	(Argentina) Marcos Mondaini	FW	(Uruguay) Fénix	loan	
March 9, 2011	(Mexico) Sergio Arias	GK	(Mexico) Guadalajara	loan	
March 9, 2011	(Mexico) Francisco Mendoza	MF	(Mexico) Guadalajara	Loan terminated September 3, 2011	
March 11, 2011	(United States) Nick LaBrocca	MF	(Canada) Toronto FC	Acquired for Alan Gordon	
March 18, 2011	(Ghana) Seth Owusu	DF	(Ghana) Medeama SC	loan, waived June 30, 2011	
May 15, 2011	(United States) Chris Cortez	FW	(United States) Chivas USA Youth Academy	Homegrown Player	
August 4, 2011	(France) Laurent Courtois	MF	(France) Grenoble	Undisclosed	
August 12, 2011	(Brazil) David Júnior Lopes	DF	(Romania) Universitatea Craiova	Undisclosed	
August 17, 2011	(Colombia) Juan Pablo Ángel	FW	(United States) Los Angeles Galaxy	Acquired for a 2012 Supplemental Draft pick	

=== Out ===
Date	Player	Position	Destination club	Fee/notes	Ref
November 24, 2010^{1}	(United States) Jonathan Bornstein	DF	(United States) Portland Timbers	Expansion Draft	
November 24, 2010	(United States) Alan Gordon	FW	(Canada) Vancouver Whitecaps	Expansion Draft, subsequently reacquired	
December 3, 2010	(Brazil) Marcelo Saragosa	MF		Option declined	
December 3, 2010	(Romania) Alexandru Zotincă	DF		Option declined	
December 3, 2010	(Mexico) Eduardo Lillingston	FW	(Mexico) Tecos	Option declined	
December 16, 2010	(Venezuela) Giancarlo Maldonado	FW	(Mexico) Atlante	Loan expired, option declined	
January 10, 2011	(El Salvador) Osael Romero	MF	(El Salvador) C.D. Águila	Option declined	
January 21, 2011	(Costa Rica) Darío Delgado	DF	(Costa Rica) Puntarenas F.C.	Option declined	
January 21, 2011	(Mexico) Rodolfo Espinoza	MF	(Peru) Sporting Cristal	Option declined, free transfer	
February 16, 2011	(United States) Sal Zizzo	MF	(United States) Portland Timbers	Traded for allocation money	
March 1, 2011	(United States) Carlos Borja	DF	(United States) Los Angeles Blues	Waived, free transfer	
March 11, 2011	(Mexico) Jesús Padilla	FW	(Mexico) C.D. Guadalajara	Loan option declined	
March 11, 2011	(United States) Alan Gordon	FW	(Canada) Toronto FC	Traded for Nick LaBrocca	
March 16, 2011	(United States) César Zamora	MF		Waived	
March 23, 2011	(Colombia) Yamith Cuesta	DF	(United States) Chicago Fire	Traded for 2012 Supplemental Draft pick	
March 23, 2011	(United States) Chukwudi Chijindu	FW	(United States) Los Angeles Blues	loan	
April 1, 2011	(Cuba) Maykel Galindo	FW	(United States) FC Dallas	Traded for 2012 Supplemental Draft pick	
July 17, 2011	(United States) Gerson Mayen	MF	(United States) Fort Lauderdale Strikers	Loan until the end of the 2011 NASL season	
August 18, 2011	(United States) Jimmy Conrad	DF	None	Retired	
August 26, 2011	(United States) Tristan Bowen	FW	(Belgium) K.S.V. Roeselare	One year loan	

^{1} Bornstein was selected by Portland in the expansion draft. He then moved to (Mexico) Tigres on a free transfer when his contract expired on January 1, 2011.

=== Future draft pick trades ===
Acquired
Year	Draft	Round	Traded from	Ref.
2012	SuperDraft	Round 4	Houston Dynamo	
2012	Supplemental	Round 1	FC Dallas	
2012	Supplemental	Unspecified	Chicago Fire	

Traded
Year	Draft	Round	Traded to	Ref.
2012	SuperDraft	Conditional pick	Real Salt Lake	
2012	Supplemental	Round 3	Los Angeles Galaxy	

== Roster ==
As of match played October 22, 2011

No.	Name	Nationality	Position	Date of birth (age)	Signed from	Signed in	Contract ends	Apps.	Goals
Goalkeepers
1	Dan Kennedy	(United States)	GK	July 22, 1982 (aged 29)	(Chile) Municipal Iquique	2008			
22	Zach Thornton	(United States)	GK	October 10, 1973 (aged 38)	New York Red Bulls	2008			
30	Sergio Arias	(Mexico)	GK	February 27, 1988 (aged 23)	loan from (Mexico) Guadalajara	2011	2011	0	0
Defenders
2	Andrew Boyens	(New Zealand)	DF	September 18, 1983 (aged 28)	New York Red Bulls	2011		13	2
3	Heath Pearce	(United States)	DF	August 13, 1984 (aged 27)	FC Dallas	2011		31	0
4	Michael Umaña	(Costa Rica)	DF	July 16, 1982 (aged 29)	Municipal Liberia	2010			
13	Ante Jazić	(Canada)	DF	February 26, 1976 (aged 35)	LA Galaxy	2009			
20	Zarek Valentin	(United States)	DF	August 6, 1991 (aged 20)	Akron Zips	2011		24	0
77	David Lopes	(Brazil)	DF	July 19, 1982 (aged 29)	(Romania) Universitatea Craiova	2011		8	0
Midfielders
5	Paulo Nagamura	(Brazil)	MF	March 2, 1983 (aged 28)	(Mexico) Tigres UANL	2010			
7	Simon Elliott	(New Zealand)	MF	June 10, 1974 (aged 37)	(New Zealand) Wellington Phoenix	2011		26	0
8	Mariano Trujillo	(Mexico)	MF	May 19, 1977 (aged 34)	(Mexico) Atlante	2009			
10	Nick LaBrocca	(United States)	MF	December 4, 1984 (aged 26)	Toronto	2011		35	8
11	Michael Lahoud	(Sierra Leone)	MF	September 15, 1986 (aged 25)	Carolina Dynamo	2009			
16	Laurent Courtois	(France)	MF	September 11, 1978 (aged 32)	(France) Grenoble Foot 38	2011		11	1
18	Blair Gavin	(United States)	MF	January 8, 1989 (aged 22)	Academy Bradenton	2010			
19	Jorge Flores	(United States)	MF	September 16, 1989 (aged 22)	Chivas USA U19	2007			
21	Ben Zemanski	(United States)	MF	May 12, 1988 (aged 23)	Cleveland Internationals	2010			
59	Bryan de la Fuente	(United States)	MF	July 1, 1992 (aged 19)	Chivas USA Academy	2010			
Forwards
9	Juan Pablo Ángel	(Colombia)	FW	October 24, 1975 (aged 35)	LA Galaxy	2011		9	7
15	Alejandro Moreno	(Venezuela)	FW	July 8, 1979 (aged 32)	Philadelphia Union	2011		24	5
17	Justin Braun	(United States)	FW	March 31, 1987 (aged 24)	Olympique Montreux	2008			
23	Marcos Mondaini	(Argentina)	FW	February 14, 1985 (aged 26)	loan from (Uruguay) Fénix	2011	2011	25	3
27	Chris Cortez	(United States)	FW	July 24, 1988 (aged 23)	California Golden Bears	2011		9	0
99	Víctor Estupiñán	(Ecuador)	FW	March 5, 1988 (aged 23)	(Ecuador) LDU Quito	2011		10	1
Away on loan
14	Gerson Mayen	(United States)	MF	February 9, 1989 (aged 22)	Chivas USA Academy	2008			
77	Chukwudi Chijindu	(United States)	FW	February 20, 1986 (aged 25)	Connecticut Huskies	2009			
	Tristan Bowen	(United States)	FW	January 30, 1991 (aged 20)	LA Galaxy	2011		2	0
Left Chivas USA
6	Francisco Mendoza	(Mexico)	MF	April 29, 1985 (aged 26)	loan from (Mexico) Guadalajara	2011	2011	12	0
9	Maykel Galindo	(Cuba)	FW	January 28, 1981 (aged 30)	Seattle Sounders	2007			
12	Jimmy Conrad	(United States)	DF	February 12, 1977 (aged 34)	Sporting Kansas City	2011		2	1
33	Seth Owusu	(Ghana)	DF	September 20, 1990 (aged 21)	loan from (Ghana) Medeama	2011	2011	1	0

=== Management ===
Position	Staff
Owner	(Mexico) Jorge Vergara
General Manager	(Mexico) Jose Domene
Head Coach	(United States) Robin Fraser
Assistant Coach	(United States) Carlos Llamosa
Assistant Coach	(United States) Greg Vanney
Technical Director	(United States) Nick Theslof
Goalkeeping Coach	(Argentina) Daniel Gonzalez
Team Administrator	(United States) Kevin Esparza
Equipment Manager	(Mexico) Raúl Guerrero
Athletic Trainer	(United States) Josh Beaumont
Strength and Conditioning Coach	Jim Liston
Therapist	(Mexico) Miguel Torres

Last updated: March 30, 2011
Source: Club Deportivo Chivas USA

=== Kits ===
Home	Home Alt.	Away

Type	Shirt	Shorts	Socks	First appearance / Info
Home	Red / White	Navy	Navy	
Home Alt.	Red / White	White	Red	MLS, June 25 against Philadelphia
Away	Navy	White	White	→ 2009 Away Shorts

== Competitions ==
=== MLS ===
==== League table ====
Pos	Team	Pld	W	L	T	GF	GA	GD	Pts	Qualification
1	LA Galaxy	34	19	5	10	48	28	+20	67	MLS Cup Conference Semifinals
2	Seattle Sounders FC	34	18	7	9	56	37	+19	63	MLS Cup Conference Semifinals
3	Real Salt Lake	34	15	11	8	44	36	+8	53	MLS Cup Conference Semifinals
4	FC Dallas	34	15	12	7	42	39	+3	52	MLS Cup Play-In Round
5	Colorado Rapids	34	12	9	13	46	42	+4	49	MLS Cup Play-In Round
6	Portland Timbers	34	11	14	9	40	48	−8	42	
7	San Jose Earthquakes	34	8	12	14	40	45	−5	38	
8	Chivas USA	34	8	14	12	41	43	−2	36	
9	Vancouver Whitecaps FC	34	6	18	10	35	55	−20	28	

Source: MLS

Pos	Team	Pld	W	L	T	GF	GA	GD	Pts	Qualification
1	LA Galaxy (S, C)	34	19	5	10	48	28	+20	67	CONCACAF Champions League
2	Seattle Sounders FC	34	18	7	9	56	37	+19	63	CONCACAF Champions League
3	Real Salt Lake	34	15	11	8	44	36	+8	53	CONCACAF Champions League
4	FC Dallas	34	15	12	7	42	39	+3	52	
5	Sporting Kansas City	34	13	9	12	50	40	+10	51	
6	Houston Dynamo	34	12	9	13	45	41	+4	49	CONCACAF Champions League
7	Colorado Rapids	34	12	9	13	44	41	+3	49	
8	Philadelphia Union	34	11	8	15	44	36	+8	48	
9	Columbus Crew	34	13	13	8	43	44	−1	47	
10	New York Red Bulls	34	10	8	16	50	44	+6	46	
11	Chicago Fire	34	9	9	16	46	45	+1	43	
12	Portland Timbers	34	11	14	9	40	48	−8	42	
13	D.C. United	34	9	13	12	49	52	−3	39	
14	San Jose Earthquakes	34	8	12	14	40	45	−5	38	
15	Chivas USA	34	8	14	12	41	43	−2	36	
16	Toronto FC	34	6	13	15	36	59	−23	33	CONCACAF Champions League
17	New England Revolution	34	5	16	13	38	58	−20	28	
18	Vancouver Whitecaps FC	34	6	18	10	35	55	−20	28	

Source: MLS
Rules for classification: 1) points; 2) head-to-head record; 3) goal difference; 4) number of goals scored
(C) Champions; (S) Supporters' Shield

==== Results summary ====
Overall								Home						Away					
Pld	W	D	L	GF	GA	GD	Pts	W	D	L	GF	GA	GD	W	D	L	GF	GA	GD
34	8	12	14	41	43	−2	36	5	5	7	19	17	+2	3	7	7	22	26	−4

Last updated: October 22, 2011.
Source: Competitive Matches

Round	1	2	3	4	5	6	7	8	9	10	11	12	13	14	15	16	17	18	19	20	21	22	23	24	25	26	27	28	29	30	31	32	33	34
Stadium	H	H	A	H	A	A	H	A	A	H	A	H	H	A	H	A	H	H	A	H	H	A	A	A	A	A	H	H	A	A	H	H	A	H
Result	L	L	T	T	T	W	W	L	W	L	T	T	W	L	L	L	T	W	T	T	W	L	W	T	T	L	L	L	L	T	W	T	L	L
Position	12	16	15	17	18	13	10	12	10	12	12	13	9	11	13	14	13	12	13	13	11	12	11											

Updated to match(es) played on August 18, 2011. Source: CDChivasUSA.com
A = Away; H = Home; W = Win; L = Loss; T = Tie

==== Results ====
March 19, 2011 1	Chivas USA	2–3	Sporting Kansas City	Carson
19:30 PST	Conrad (yellow card) 27' (goal) 56'; Valentin (yellow card) 52'; Zemanski 84'	Report	Sapong 2'; Arnaud (yellow card) 23'; Bravo 48', 74' (yellow card) 71'	Stadium: The Home Depot Center; Attendance: 18,122; Referee: Edvin Jurisevic

March 26, 2011 2	Chivas USA	0–1	Colorado Rapids	Carson
19:30 PST	Zemanski (yellow card) 72'; Braun (yellow card) 78'	Report	Amarikwa 31'; Mullan (yellow card) 39'; Pickens (yellow card) 79'; Wallace (yellow card) 81'; Casey (yellow card) 89'; Mastroeni (yellow card) 90+6'	Stadium: The Home Depot Center; Attendance: 13,027; Referee: Terry Vaughn

April 2, 2011 3	Toronto FC	1–1	Chivas USA	Toronto
10:00 PST	Gordon 36' de Guzman (yellow card) 89'	Report	Moreno 2'	Stadium: BMO Field; Attendance: 18,968; Referee: Baldomero Toledo

April 9, 2011 4	Chivas USA	0–0	Columbus Crew	Carson
19:30 PST	Mondaini (yellow card) 35'; Valentin (yellow card) 59'; Flores (yellow card) 65'; LaBrocca (yellow card) 86'; Lahoud (yellow card) 87'	Report	James (yellow card) 55'; Burns (yellow card) 64'; Miranda (yellow card) 81'	Stadium: The Home Depot Center; Attendance: 13,385; Referee: Yader Reyes

April 16, 2011 5	Vancouver Whitecaps FC	0–0	Chivas USA	Vancouver
16:00 PST	Brovsky (yellow card) 55'; Hassli (yellow card) 64'; Boxall (yellow card) 86'	Report	LaBrocca (yellow card) 67'	Stadium: Empire Field; Attendance: 20,809; Referee: Jorge Gonzalez

April 23, 2011 6	San Jose Earthquakes	1–2	Chivas USA	Santa Clara
13:00 PST	Wondolowski 16'; Cronin (yellow card) 20'	Report	Moreno 45+1'; Trujillo 85'	Stadium: Buck Shaw Stadium; Attendance: 10,525; Referee: Jair Marrufo

April 30, 2011 7	Chivas USA	3–0	New England Revolution	Carson
19:30 PST	LaBrocca 22'; Mondaini 45'; Moreno 57'; Zemanski (yellow card) 66'	Report	Coria (yellow card) 33'; Joseph (yellow card) 39'	Stadium: The Home Depot Center; Attendance: 14,058; Referee: Mark Kadlecik

May 7, 2011 8	Real Salt Lake	1–0	Chivas USA	Sandy
13:00 PST	Johnson 87'	Report	Boyens (yellow card) 15' (yellow-red card) 24'; Mondaini (red card) 37'	Stadium: Rio Tinto Stadium; Attendance: 14,365; Referee: Paul Ward

May 15, 2011 9	New York Red Bulls	2–3	Chivas USA	Harrison
16:00 PST	Henry 21' (yellow card) 62'; De Rosario 35'	Report	Braun 6', 31', 56'; Cortez (yellow card) 81'	Stadium: Red Bull Arena; Attendance: 16,365; Referee: Alex Prus

May 21, 2011 10	Chivas USA	0–1	LA Galaxy	Carson
19:00 PST	Elliott (yellow card) 50'; Valentin (yellow card) 73'	Report	Barrett 26'	Stadium: The Home Depot Center; Attendance: 27,000; Referee: Jair Marrufo

May 28, 2011 11	Columbus Crew	3–3	Chivas USA	Columbus
16:30 PST	Mendoza 17', 52'; Ekpo 64'	Report	LaBrocca 4'; Flores (yellow card) 21' (yellow-red card) 69' (goal) 57'; Boyens 37'; Pearce (yellow card) 46'	Stadium: Crew Stadium; Attendance: 9,431; Referee: Jasen Anno

June 1, 2011 12	Chivas USA	1–1	Vancouver Whitecaps FC	Carson
19:30 PST	LaBrocca 46'; Estupinan (yellow card) 79'	Report	Camilo 48'; Hassli (yellow card) 66'; Akloul (yellow card) 86'	Stadium: The Home Depot Center; Attendance: 11,753; Referee: Ricardo Salazar

June 4, 2011 13	Chivas USA	1–0	Portland Timbers	Carson
19:30 PST	Valentin (yellow card) 18'; LaBrocca (yellow card) 28'; Braun (yellow card) 35'; Nagamura (yellow card) 66'; Mondaini 70'	Report	Hall (yellow card) 32'	Stadium: The Home Depot Center; Attendance: 14,076; Referee: Chris Penso

June 11, 2011 14	Houston Dynamo	2–1	Chivas USA	Houston
17:30 PST	Cameron 29'; Pearce 56' (o.g.)	Report	Mondaini 7'; Umaña (yellow card) 48'; Pearce (yellow card) 59'	Stadium: Robertson Stadium; Attendance: 19,333; Referee: Geoff Gamble

June 18, 2011 15	Chivas USA	1–2	FC Dallas	Carson
19:30 PST	Lahoud (yellow card) 6' (goal) 71'; Kennedy (yellow card) 39'; Elliott (yellow card) 77'	Report	Shea 8' (yellow card) 29'; Chávez (yellow card) 77'; Jackson 85'	Stadium: The Home Depot Center; Attendance: 11,253; Referee: Edvin Jurisevic

June 25, 2011 16	Philadelphia Union	3–2	Chivas USA	Chester
16:30 PST	Paunovic 48'; Valdes (yellow card) 64'; Ruiz 69'; Mwanga 82'	Report	Umaña 28'; Braun 77'	Stadium: PPL Park; Attendance: 18,139; Referee: Jair Marrufo

July 2, 2011 17	Chivas USA	1–1	Chicago Fire	Carson
19:00 PST	LaBrocca 46'; Lahoud (yellow card) 67'	Report	Oduro 26'; Pappa (yellow card) 55'	Stadium: The Home Depot Center; Attendance: 15,152; Referee: Andrew Chapin

July 6, 2011 18	Chivas USA	2–0	San Jose Earthquakes	Carson
19:30 PST	Zemanski 64'; LaBrocca 84'	Report	Lenhart (yellow card) 60'	Stadium: The Home Depot Center; Attendance: 9,425; Referee: Baldomero Toledo

July 9, 2011 19	Sporting Kansas City	1–1	Chivas USA	Kansas City
1630 PST	Bravo 90+3'	Report	LaBrocca 30'; Braun (yellow card) 32'	Stadium: Livestrong Sporting Park; Attendance: 18,467; Referee: Jasen Anno

July 16, 2011 20	Chivas USA	0–0	New York Red Bulls	Carson
19:30 PST	Trujillo (yellow card) 39'; Zemanski (yellow card) 59'	Report		Stadium: The Home Depot Center; Attendance: 14,838; Referee: Baldomero Toledo

July 23, 2011 21	Chivas USA	3–0	Houston Dynamo	Carson
19:30 PST	Braun 31', 40', 86' (yellow card) 81'	Report	Watson (yellow card) 43' (yellow-red card) 70'	Stadium: The Home Depot Center; Attendance: 11,013; Referee: Alejandro Mariscal

July 31, 2011 22	FC Dallas	1–0	Chivas USA	Frisco
16:00 PST	Chávez 26'; Warshaw (yellow card) 49'; Guarda (yellow card) 53'	Report	Valentin (yellow card) 16'	Stadium: Pizza Hut Park; Attendance: 10,023; Referee: Elias Bazakos

August 6, 2011 23	New England Revolution	2–3	Chivas USA	Foxborough
16:30 PST	Joseph 69'; Fagundez 86'	Report	Moreno 31', 80'; LaBrocca 59'; Kennedy (yellow card) 70'	Stadium: Gillette Stadium; Attendance: 11,523; Referee: Mark Kadlecik

August 13, 2011 24	Seattle Sounders FC	0–0	Chivas USA	Seattle
13:00 PST	Wahl (yellow card) 23'; Friberg (yellow card) 89'	Report	LaBrocca (yellow card) 34'; Elliott (yellow card) 45'; Jazic (yellow card) 80'	Stadium: Qwest Field; Attendance: 36,364; Referee: Kevin Stott

August 20, 2011 25	Colorado Rapids	2–2	Chivas USA	Commerce City
18:00 PST	Folan 13'; Larentowicz 69'	Report	Umaña (yellow card) 19'; Ángel 36'; Courtois 86'	Stadium: Dick's Sporting Goods Park; Attendance: 16,852; Referee: Elias Bazakos

August 24, 2011 26	Portland Timbers	1–0	Chivas USA	Portland
20:00 PST	Brunner 44'; Chara (yellow card) 47'	Report	Nagamura (yellow card) 31'; Trujillo (yellow card) 43'; Jazic (yellow card) 86'	Stadium: Jeld-Wen Field; Attendance: 18,627; Referee: Edvin Jurisevic

August 27, 2011 27	Chivas USA	0–1	Real Salt Lake	Carson
19:30 PST	Lopes (yellow card) 79'	Report	Saborio 11'; Borchers (red card) 24'; Beckerman (yellow card) 74'	Stadium: The Home Depot Center; Attendance: 14,127; Referee: Kevin Stott

September 10, 2011 28	Chivas USA	0–3	D.C. United	Carson
19:30 PST	Angel (yellow card) 29'; Lopes (red card) 69'	Report	Davies 11', 14', 66'	Stadium: The Home Depot Center; Attendance: 12,245; Referee: Ricardo Salazar

September 17, 2011 29	Chicago Fire	3–2	Chivas USA	Bridgeview
13:00 PST	Gibbs 2' (red card) 37'; Ángel 26' (o.g.); Mikulic (yellow card) 73'; Oduro 85'	Report	Lahoud (yellow card) 5'; Ángel 61'; LaBrocca 63'	Stadium: Toyota Park; Attendance: 15,246; Referee: Gabriel Gonzales

September 21, 2011 30	D.C. United	2–2	Chivas USA	Washington, D.C.
16:30 PST	McDonald (yellow card) 20'; De Rosario 39'; White 47'	Report	Zemanski (yellow card) 30'; Umaña (yellow card) 46'; Ángel 57', 70'	Stadium: RFK Stadium; Attendance: 14,849; Referee: Chris Penso

September 24, 2011 31	Chivas USA	3–0	Toronto FC	Carson
19:30 PST	Ángel 12', 77'; Zemanski (yellow card) 54'; Braun 71'	Report	Morgan (yellow card) 8'; Eckersley (yellow card) 27'; Iro (yellow card) 43'	Stadium: The Home Depot Center; Attendance: 14,357; Referee: Kevin Stott

October 2, 2011 32	Chivas USA	1–1	Philadelphia Union	Carson
17:00 PST	Lopes (yellow card) 21'; Ángel 90'	Report	Farfan (yellow card) 28'; Mapp 59'; MacMath (yellow card) 77'	Stadium: The Home Depot Center; Attendance: 16,134; Referee: Michael Kennedy

October 16, 2011 32	LA Galaxy	1–0	Chivas USA	Carson
18:00 PST	Barrett 53'; Berhalter (yellow card) 57'	Report	Ángel (yellow card) 61'; Jazic (yellow card) 75'	Stadium: The Home Depot Center; Attendance: 27,000; Referee: Jair Marrufo

October 22, 2011 34	Chivas USA	1–3	Seattle Sounders FC	Carson
19:30 PST	Zemanski (yellow card) 5'; Estupiñán 83'	Report	Levesque (yellow card) 40'; Boyens 53' (o.g.); Fernández 68'; Ochoa 73'; Evans (yellow card) 79'; Montero (yellow card) 80'	Stadium: The Home Depot Center; Attendance: 22,137; Referee: Ricardo Salazar

=== U.S. Open Cup ===
March 29, 2011 Play-in round	Portland Timbers	2–0	Chivas USA	Portland
19:00 PST	Purdy (yellow card) 74'; Jewsbury 84'; Brunner 86'; Hall (yellow card) 89'	Report	Mondaini (yellow card) 14'; Boyens (yellow card) 35' (yellow-red card) 43'; Braun (yellow card) 49'	Stadium: Merlo Field; Attendance: 5,061; Referee: Juan Guzman

== Statistics ==
As of Match played October 22, 2011

=== Appearances and goals ===
No.	Pos	Nat	Player	Total		MLS		U.S. Open Cup	
No.	Pos	Nat	Player	Apps	Goals	Apps	Goals	Apps	Goals
1	GK	(United States) USA	Dan Kennedy	33	0	32	0	1	0
2	DF	(New Zealand) NZL	Andrew Boyens	13	1	10+2	1	1	0
3	DF	(United States) USA	Heath Pearce	31	0	29+1	0	1	0
4	DF	(Costa Rica) CRC	Michael Umaña	22	0	21+1	0	0	0
5	MF	(Brazil) BRA	Paulo Nagamura	11	0	6+5	0	0	0
7	MF	(New Zealand) NZL	Simon Elliott	26	0	21+5	0	0	0
8	MF	(Mexico) MEX	Mariano Trujillo	12	1	0+12	1	0	0
9	FW	(Colombia) COL	Juan Pablo Ángel	9	7	9	7	0	0
10	MF	(United States) USA	Nick LaBrocca	35	8	34	8	1	0
11	MF	(Sierra Leone) SLE	Michael Lahoud	24	1	17+6	1	1	0
13	DF	(Canada) CAN	Ante Jazić	29	0	28	0	0+1	0
15	FW	(Venezuela) VEN	Alejandro Moreno	24	5	21+3	5	0	0
16	MF	(France) FRA	Laurent Courtois	11	1	3+8	1	0	0
17	FW	(United States) USA	Justin Braun	30	8	22+7	8	1	0
18	MF	(United States) USA	Blair Gavin	18	0	11+7	0	0	0
19	MF	(United States) USA	Jorge Flores	26	1	24+1	1	0+1	0
20	DF	(United States) USA	Zarek Valentin	24	0	24	0	0	0
21	MF	(United States) USA	Ben Zemanski	29	2	23+5	2	1	0
22	GK	(United States) USA	Zach Thornton	2	0	2	0	0	0
23	FW	(Argentina) ARG	Marcos Mondaini	25	3	21+3	3	1	0
27	FW	(United States) USA	Chris Cortez	9	0	1+8	0	0	0
77	DF	(Brazil) BRA	David Lopes	8	0	7+1	0	0	0
99	FW	(Ecuador) ECU	Víctor Estupiñán	10	1	3+6	1	1	0
Players away from Chivas USA on loan:
14	MF	(United States) USA	Gerson Mayen	4	0	1+3	0	0	0
	FW	(United States) USA	Tristan Bowen	2	0	0+1	0	0+1	0
Players who left Chivas USA during the season:
6	MF	(Mexico) MEX	Francisco Mendoza	12	0	2+9	0	1	0
12	DF	(United States) USA	Jimmy Conrad	2	1	2	1	0	0
33	DF	(Ghana) GHA	Seth Owusu	1	0	0	0	1	0

=== Goal scorers ===
Place	Position	Nation	Number	Name	MLS	U.S. Open Cup	Total
1	MF	(United States)	10	Nick LaBrocca	8	0	8
1	FW	(United States)	17	Justin Braun	8	0	8
3	FW	(Colombia)	9	Juan Pablo Ángel	7	0	7
4	FW	(Venezuela)	15	Alejandro Moreno	5	0	5
5	FW	(Argentina)	23	Marcos Mondaini	3	0	3
6	MF	(United States)	21	Ben Zemanski	2	0	2
7	DF	(United States)	12	Jimmy Conrad	1	0	1
7	MF	(Mexico)	8	Mariano Trujillo	1	0	1
7	MF	(United States)	19	Jorge Flores	1	0	1
7	DF	(New Zealand)	2	Andrew Boyens	1	0	1
7	MF	(Sierra Leone)	11	Michael Lahoud	1	0	1
7	MF	(France)	16	Laurent Courtois	1	0	1
7	FW	(Ecuador)	99	Víctor Estupiñán	1	0	1
				TOTALS	41	0	41

=== Disciplinary record ===
Number	Nation	Position	Name	MLS		U.S. Open Cup		Total	
Number	Nation	Position	Name	Booked	Sent off (straight red)	Booked	Sent off (straight red)	Booked	Sent off (straight red)
1	(United States)	GK	Dan Kennedy	2	0	0	0	2	0
2	(New Zealand)	DF	Andrew Boyens	2	1	2	1	4	2
3	(United States)	DF	Heath Pearce	2	0	0	0	2	0
4	(Costa Rica)	DF	Michael Umaña	3	0	0	0	3	0
5	(Brazil)	MF	Paulo Nagamura	2	0	0	0	2	0
7	(New Zealand)	MF	Simon Elliott	3	0	0	0	3	0
8	(Mexico)	MF	Mariano Trujillo	2	0	0	0	2	0
9	(Colombia)	FW	Juan Pablo Ángel	2	0	0	0	2	0
10	(United States)	MF	Nick LaBrocca	4	0	0	0	4	0
11	(Sierra Leone)	MF	Michael Lahoud	4	0	0	0	4	0
12	(United States)	DF	Jimmy Conrad	1	0	0	0	1	0
13	(Canada)	DF	Ante Jazić	3	0	0	0	3	0
17	(United States)	FW	Justin Braun	4	0	1	0	5	0
19	(United States)	MF	Jorge Flores	3	1	0	0	3	1
20	(United States)	DF	Zarek Valentin	5	0	0	0	5	0
21	(United States)	MF	Ben Zemanski	6	0	0	0	6	0
23	(Argentina)	FW	Marcos Mondaini	1	1	1	0	2	1
27	(United States)	FW	Chris Cortez	1	0	0	0	1	0
77	(Brazil)	DF	David Lopes	2	1	0	0	2	1
99	(Ecuador)	FW	Víctor Estupiñán	1	0	0	0	1	0
			TOTALS	53	4	4	1	57	5
