= List of Major League Soccer transfers 2010 =

The following is a list of transfers for the 2010 Major League Soccer season. Yura Movsisyan's move to Randers FC, Chris Rolfe's move to AaB Fodbold, Cuauhtémoc Blanco's move to Veracruz and David Beckham's loan move to Milan were made during the 2009 season, but those four transfers did not take effect until January 1, 2010. The rest of the transfers were made during the 2009–10 off-season all the way throughout the 2010 MLS season.

== Transfers ==
| Date | Name | Moving from | Moving to | Mode of Transfer |
|---|---|---|---|---|
| July 6, 2009 | (Armenia) Yura Movsisyan | Real Salt Lake | (Denmark) Randers FC | Free |
| September 2, 2009 | (United States) Chris Rolfe | Chicago Fire | (Denmark) Aalborg BK | Free |
| October 29, 2009 | (Mexico) Cuauhtémoc Blanco | Chicago Fire | (Mexico) Veracruz | Free |
| November 2, 2009 | (England) David Beckham | Los Angeles Galaxy | (Italy) Milan | Loan |
| November 26, 2009 | (United States) Chris Seitz | Real Salt Lake | Philadelphia Union | Trade |
| November 27, 2009 | (United States) Jordan Harvey | Colorado Rapids | Philadelphia Union | Expansion Draft |
| November 27, 2009 | (United States) Andrew Jacobson | D.C. United | Philadelphia Union | Expansion Draft |
| November 27, 2009 | (United States) Brad Knighton | New England Revolution | Philadelphia Union | Expansion Draft |
| November 27, 2009 | (France) Sébastien Le Toux | Seattle Sounders FC | Philadelphia Union | Expansion Draft |
| November 27, 2009 | (Brazil) Stefani Miglioranzi | Los Angeles Galaxy | Philadelphia Union | Expansion Draft |
| November 27, 2009 | (Venezuela) Alejandro Moreno | Columbus Crew | Philadelphia Union | Expansion Draft |
| November 27, 2009 | (Costa Rica) David Myrie | Chicago Fire | Philadelphia Union | Expansion Draft |
| November 27, 2009 | (United States) Shea Salinas | San Jose Earthquakes | Philadelphia Union | Expansion Draft |
| November 27, 2009 | (Jamaica) Shavar Thomas | Chivas USA | Philadelphia Union | Expansion Draft |
| November 27, 2009 | (United States) Nick Zimmerman | New York Red Bulls | Philadelphia Union | Expansion Draft |
| December 3, 2009 | (United States) Danny Califf | (Denmark) Midtjylland | Philadelphia Union | Undisclosed |
| December 3, 2009 | (Guatemala) Marco Pappa | (Guatemala) Municipal | Chicago Fire | Undisclosed |
| December 14, 2009 | (South Africa) Ty Shipalane | (United States) Harrisburg City Islanders | D.C. United | Free |
| December 17, 2009 | (Honduras) Amado Guevara | Toronto FC | (Honduras) Motagua | Free |
| December 18, 2009 | (United States) Landon Donovan | Los Angeles Galaxy | (England) Everton | Loan |
| December 23, 2009 | (Brazil) Alex Cazumba | (Brazil) São Paulo | Los Angeles Galaxy | Loan |
| December 23, 2009 | (Brazil) Juninho | (Brazil) São Paulo | Los Angeles Galaxy | Loan |
| December 23, 2009 | (Brazil) Leonardo | (Brazil) São Paulo | Los Angeles Galaxy | Loan |
| January 5, 2010 | (United States) Herculez Gomez | Kansas City Wizards | (Mexico) Puebla | Free |
| January 5, 2010 | (Costa Rica) Roy Miller | (Norway) Rosenborg | New York Red Bulls | Undisclosed |
| January 5, 2010 | (Venezuela) Jorge Rojas | New York Red Bulls | (Venezuela) Deportivo Táchira | Free |
| January 6, 2010 | (Costa Rica) Gonzalo Segares | Chicago Fire | (Cyprus) Apollon Limassol | Free |
| January 8, 2010 | (Mexico) Eduardo Lillingston | Chivas USA | (Mexico) Tijuana | Loan |
| January 10, 2010 | (Brazil) Luciano Emilio | D.C. United | (Brazil) Rio Branco | Free |
| January 14, 2010 | (United States) Chris Albright | New England Revolution | New York Red Bulls | Pre-draft Trade |
| January 14, 2010 | (Brazil) Fred | D.C. United | Philadelphia Union | Pre-draft Trade |
| January 14, 2010 | (United States) Clint Mathis | Real Salt Lake | Los Angeles Galaxy | Trade |
| January 14, 2010 | (United States) Troy Perkins | (Norway) Vålerenga | D.C. United | Undisclosed |
| January 19, 2010 | (Australia) Daniel Allsopp | (Qatar) Al-Rayyan | D.C. United | Undisclosed |
| January 19, 2010 | (United States) Ricardo Clark | Houston Dynamo | (Germany) Eintracht Frankfurt | Free |
| January 19, 2010 | (Brazil) Paulo Nagamura | Chivas USA | (Mexico) UANL | Free |
| January 20, 2010 | (Guadeloupe) Stéphane Auvray | (France) Nîmes Olympique | Kansas City Wizards | Free |
| January 21, 2010 | (El Salvador) Julio Enrique Martínez | (Mexico) León | Chicago Fire | Loan |
| January 21, 2010 | (Colombia) Pablo Escobar | (Colombia) Deportivo Cali | Kansas City Wizards | Undisclosed |
| January 21, 2010 | (Canada) Kevin Harmse | Chivas USA | Houston Dynamo | Trade |
| January 21, 2010 | (United States) Jacob Peterson | Colorado Rapids | Toronto FC | Trade |
| January 22, 2010 | (United States) Preston Burpo | Colorado Rapids | New England Revolution | Trade |
| January 22, 2010 | (United States) Cory Gibbs | Colorado Rapids | New England Revolution | Trade |
| January 22, 2010 | (United States) Jeff Larentowicz | New England Revolution | Colorado Rapids | Trade |
| January 22, 2010 | (United States) Wells Thompson | New England Revolution | Colorado Rapids | Trade |
| January 26, 2010 | (United States) Stuart Holden | Houston Dynamo | (England) Bolton Wanderers | Free |
| January 27, 2010 | (Poland) Krzysztof Król | (Poland) Jagiellonia Białystok | Chicago Fire | Loan |
| January 29, 2010 | (United States) Michael Orozco Fiscal | (Mexico) San Luis | Philadelphia Union | Loan |
| February 1, 2010 | (United States) Steve Ralston | New England Revolution | (United States) AC St. Louis | Free |
| February 1, 2010 | (El Salvador) Osael Romero | (El Salvador) Vista Hermosa | Chivas USA | Loan |
| February 2, 2010 | (United States) Blake Wagner | FC Dallas | (Canada) Vancouver Whitecaps | Free |
| February 3, 2010 | (United States) Adam Cristman | Kansas City Wizards | D.C. United | Trade |
| February 5, 2010 | (Colombia) Sergio Herrera | (Colombia) Deportivo Cali | Columbus Crew | Undisclosed |
| February 9, 2010 | (Brazil) Eduardo | (Switzerland) FC Basel | San Jose Earthquakes | Undisclosed |
| February 9, 2010 | (Estonia) Joel Lindpere | (Norway) Tromsø | New York Red Bulls | Undisclosed |
| February 10, 2010 | (United States) Ty Harden | Colorado Rapids | Toronto FC | Trade |
| February 10, 2010 | (United States) Rauwshan McKenzie | Unattached | Real Salt Lake | Free |
| February 11, 2010 | (Republic of Ireland) Danny Earls | (United States) Rochester Rhinos | Colorado Rapids | Undisclosed |
| February 11, 2010 | (United States) Joey Gjertsen | (Canada) Montreal Impact | San Jose Earthquakes | Undisclosed |
| February 11, 2010 | (Colombia) Óscar Murillo | (Colombia) Deportes Quindío | Colorado Rapids | Loan |
| February 11, 2010 | (Denmark) Jimmy Nielsen | (Denmark) Vejle Boldklub | Kansas City Wizards | Free |
| February 15, 2010 | (Colombia) Jhon Kennedy Hurtado | (Colombia) Deportivo Cali | Seattle Sounders FC | Undisclosed |
| February 22, 2010 | (Senegal) Joseph Niouky | (Senegal) Port Autonome | New England Revolution | Undisclosed |
| February 23, 2010 | (United States) Luis Gil | Kansas City Wizards | Real Salt Lake | Trade |
| March 1, 2010 | (Argentina) Javier Robles | (Argentina) Olimpo | San Jose Earthquakes | Loan |
| March 4, 2010 | (Switzerland) Blaise Nkufo | (Netherlands) FC Twente | Seattle Sounders FC | Free |
| March 5, 2010 | (Costa Rica) Kurt Morsink | Unattached | D.C. United | Free |
| March 8, 2010 | (United States) Kevin Hartman | Kansas City Wizards | FC Dallas | Trade |
| March 8, 2010 | (Colombia) Roger Torres | (Colombia) América de Cali | Philadelphia Union | Loan |
| March 9, 2010 | (United States) Ian Joyce | (England) Southend United | Colorado Rapids | Free |
| March 11, 2010 | (Wales) Carl Robinson | Toronto FC | New York Red Bulls | Trade |
| March 11, 2010 | (Canada) Greg Sutton | Unattached | New York Red Bulls | Free |
| March 11, 2010 | (Costa Rica) Michael Umaña | (Costa Rica) Municipal Liberia | Chivas USA | Undisclosed |
| March 12, 2010 | (Netherlands) Collins John | Unattached | Chicago Fire | Free |
| March 12, 2010 | (Canada) Adrian Serioux | Toronto FC | Houston Dynamo | Trade |
| March 14, 2010 | (Costa Rica) Álvaro Saborío | Unattached | Real Salt Lake | Free |
| March 15, 2010 | (Moldova) Igor Kostrov | (Israel) Hapoel Be'er Sheva | Kansas City Wizards | Undisclosed |
| March 15, 2010 | (Grenada) Craig Rocastle | (England) Forest Green Rovers | Kansas City Wizards | Undisclosed |
| March 15, 2010 | (England) Ryan Smith | Unattached | Kansas City Wizards | Free |
| March 16, 2010 | (India) Sunil Chhetri | (India) Dempo SC | Kansas City Wizards | Free |
| March 17, 2010 | (Jamaica) Lyle Adams | Unattached | D.C. United | Free |
| March 17, 2010 | (Senegal) Birahim Diop | Unattached | Kansas City Wizards | Free |
| March 18, 2010 | (United States) Tim Melia | (United States) Rochester Rhinos | Real Salt Lake | Free |
| March 19, 2010 | (Jamaica) Lovel Palmer | (Jamaica) Harbour View | Houston Dynamo | Undisclosed |
| March 23, 2010 | (Ghana) Salou Ibrahim | (Denmark) Vejle Boldklub | New York Red Bulls | Undisclosed |
| March 24, 2010 | (United States) Michael Fucito | Unattached | Seattle Sounders FC | Free |
| March 25, 2010 | (United States) Nick LaBrocca | Colorado Rapids | Toronto FC | Trade |
| March 25, 2010 | (Bolivia) Juan Manuel Peña | Unattached | D.C. United | Free |
| March 25, 2010 | (United States) Carlos Borja | (Mexico) Tapatio | Chivas USA | Free |
| March 25, 2010 | (United States) Marvell Wynne | Toronto FC | Colorado Rapids | Trade |
| March 26, 2010 | (United States) Juan Agudelo | Unattached | New York Red Bulls | Free |
| March 26, 2010 | (United States) Jon Conway | Unattached | Toronto FC | Free |
| March 26, 2010 | (Serbia) Marko Perović | (Switzerland) FC Basel | New England Revolution | Free |
| March 26, 2010 | (Argentina) Martin Šarić | (Slovenia) NK Celje | Toronto FC | Free |
| March 26, 2010 | (Bermuda) Khano Smith | Unattached | New England Revolution | Free |
| March 26, 2010 | (United States) Carey Talley | Unattached | D.C. United | Free |
| March 27, 2010 | (United States) Dan Gargan | Unattached | Toronto FC | Free |
| March 28, 2010 | (United States) Jon Busch | Unattached | San Jose Earthquakes | Free |
| March 31, 2010 | (Costa Rica) Darío Delgado | (Costa Rica) Puntarenas | Chivas USA | Loan |
| March 31, 2010 | (United States) Pat Noonan | Unattached | Seattle Sounders FC | Free |
| April 2, 2010 | (Argentina) Claudio López | Unattached | Colorado Rapids | Free |
| April 2, 2010 | (Trinidad and Tobago) Scott Sealy | Unattached | San Jose Earthquakes | Free |
| April 6, 2010 | (Serbia) Miloš Kočić | Unattached | Toronto FC | Free |
| April 7, 2010 | (United States) Quincy Amarikwa | San Jose Earthquakes | Colorado Rapids | Trade |
| April 8, 2010 | (El Salvador) Deris Umanzor | (El Salvador) Águila | Chicago Fire | Free |
| April 9, 2010 | (United States) Cristian Arrieta | Puerto Rico Islanders | Philadelphia Union | Free |
| April 10, 2010 | (Latvia) Raivis Hščanovičs | (Latvia) Skonto | Toronto FC | Undisclosed |
| April 12, 2010 | (Canada) Adrian Cann | (Denmark) Esbjerg fB | Toronto FC | Undisclosed |
| April 12, 2010 | (Zimbabwe) Joseph Ngwenya | Unattached | Houston Dynamo | Free |
| April 12, 2010 | (Russia) Maxim Usanov | (Russia) Krasnodar | Toronto FC | Undisclosed |
| April 15, 2010 | (Denmark) Brian Nielsen | (Denmark) Vejle Boldklub | New York Red Bulls | Loan |
| April 28, 2010 | (Brazil) Luciano Emilio | (Brazil) Rio Branco | D.C. United | Free |
| April 30, 2010 | (United States) Stephen King | Seattle Sounders FC | D.C. United | Trade |
| April 30, 2010 | (Costa Rica) José Macotelo | (Costa Rica) Puntarenas | Chivas USA | Loan |
| April 30, 2010 | (Colombia) Miguel Montaño | (Argentina) Quilmes | Seattle Sounders FC | Undisclosed |
| May 13, 2010 | (France) Léandre Griffit | (England) Crystal Palace | Columbus Crew | Undisclosed |
| May 13, 2010 | (United States) Jeff Parke | (Canada) Vancouver Whitecaps | Seattle Sounders FC | Free |
| May 13, 2010 | (Colombia) Milton Rodríguez | (Colombia) Real Cartagena | FC Dallas | Undisclosed |
| May 25, 2010 | (United States) Jamar Beasley | Unattached | Kansas City Wizards | Free |
| June 4, 2010 | (Romania) Alex Zotincă | Unattached | Chivas USA | Free |
| June 8, 2010 | (United States) Steve Ralston | (United States) AC St. Louis | New England Revolution | Free |
| June 10, 2010 | (United States) Sacha Kljestan | Chivas USA | (Belgium) Anderlecht | Undisclosed |
| June 15, 2010 | (Montenegro) Branko Bošković | (Austria) Rapid Wien | D.C. United | Undisclosed |
| June 21, 2010 | (United States) Sam Cronin | Toronto FC | San Jose Earthquakes | Trade |
| June 25, 2010 | (Brazil) Paulo Nagamura | (Mexico) UANL | Chivas USA | Undisclosed |
| June 30, 2010 | (Jamaica) Shavar Thomas | Philadelphia Union | Kansas City Wizards | Trade |
| July 1, 2010 | (Argentina) Pablo Hernandez | (Uruguay) Defensor Sporting | D.C. United | Loan |
| July 6, 2010 | (Spain) Mista | (Spain) Deportivo La Coruña | Toronto FC | Undisclosed |
| July 8, 2010 | (Venezuela) Giancarlo Maldonado | (Mexico) Atlante | Chivas USA | Undisclosed |
| July 9, 2010 | (Brazil) Maicon Santos | (Brazil) Bonsucesso | Toronto FC | Loan |
| July 13, 2010 | (France) Thierry Henry | (Spain) Barcelona | New York Red Bulls | Free |
| July 14, 2010 | (Mexico) Rodolfo Espinoza | (Peru) Universitario | Chivas USA | Undisclosed |
| July 14, 2010 | (Ghana) Anthony Obodai | (Netherlands) RKC Waalwijk | Houston Dynamo | Undisclosed |
| July 17, 2010 | (Mexico) Nery Castillo | (Ukraine) Shakhtar Donetsk | Chicago Fire | Loan |
| July 17, 2010 | (Greece) Nikos Kounenakis | (Cyprus) Aris Limassol | Kansas City Wizards | Undisclosed |
| July 20, 2010 | (Mexico) Eduardo Lillingston | Chivas USA | (Mexico) Indios | Loan |
| July 21, 2010 | (United States) Sal Zizzo | (Germany) Hannover 96 | Chivas USA | Lottery |
| July 22, 2010 | (Argentina) Eduardo Coudet | (Argentina) Colón | Philadelphia Union | Undisclosed |
| July 26, 2010 | (United States) Justin Mapp | Chicago Fire | Philadelphia Union | Trade |
| July 29, 2010 | (Uruguay) Álvaro Fernández | (Uruguay) Nacional | Seattle Sounders FC | Undisclosed |
| July 30, 2010 | (Argentina) Santiago Hirsig | Kansas City Wizards | (Argentina) Quilmes | Undisclosed |
| July 30, 2010 | (Brazil) Roberto Linck | (Romania) Râmnicu Vâlcea | New England Revolution | Undisclosed |
| July 30, 2010 | (Sweden) Freddie Ljungberg | Seattle Sounders FC | Chicago Fire | Trade |
| July 30, 2010 | (Serbia) Ilija Stolica | (Montenegro) FK Budućnost | New England Revolution | Undisclosed |
| July 30, 2010 | (United States) Anthony Wallace | FC Dallas | Colorado Rapids | Trade |
| July 31, 2010 | (United States) J. T. Noone | (United States) Harrisburg City Islanders | Philadelphia Union | Free |
| August 2, 2010 | (Mexico) Rafael Márquez | (Spain) Barcelona | New York Red Bulls | Undisclosed |
| August 4, 2010 | (United States) Brian Perk | Unattached | Los Angeles Galaxy | Free |
| August 5, 2010 | (United States) Alan Gordon | Los Angeles Galaxy | Chivas USA | Trade |
| August 5, 2010 | (Colombia) Juan Diego González | (Colombia) Deportivo Pereira | Philadelphia Union | Undisclosed |
| August 6, 2010 | (Costa Rica) Gonzalo Segares | (Cyprus) Apollon Limassol | Chicago Fire | Free |
| August 6, 2010 | (United States) Tim Ward | Chicago Fire | San Jose Earthquakes | Trade |
| August 6, 2010 | (United States) Jed Zayner | Columbus Crew | D.C. United | Trade |
| August 11, 2010 | (Jamaica) Khari Stephenson | (Norway) Aalesund | San Jose Earthquakes | Undisclosed |
| August 13, 2010 | (Brazil) Jackson | (Brazil) São Paulo | FC Dallas | Loan |
| August 14, 2010 | (Mexico) Omar Bravo | (Mexico) Guadalajara | Kansas City Wizards | Undisclosed |
| August 14, 2010 | (Mexico) Omar Bravo | Kansas City Wizards | (Mexico) Guadalajara | Loan |
| August 16, 2010 | (Brazil) Geovanni | Unattached | San Jose Earthquakes | Free |
| August 31, 2010 | (United States) Sheanon Williams | (United States) Harrisburg City Islanders | Philadelphia Union | Free |
| September 4, 2010 | (Peru) Andrés Mendoza | (Turkey) Diyarbakirspor | Columbus Crew | Undisclosed |
| September 9, 2010 | (Brazil) Paulo Araujo Jr. | (United States) Miami FC | Real Salt Lake | Loan |
| September 14, 2010 | (Morocco) Mehdi Ballouchy | Colorado Rapids | New York Red Bulls | Trade |
| September 14, 2010 | (Senegal) Macoumba Kandji | New York Red Bulls | Colorado Rapids | Trade |
| September 14, 2010 | (Serbia) Bratislav Ristić | (Serbia) FK Rad | Chicago Fire | Free |
| September 14, 2010 | (Spain) Carlos Varela | Unattached | D.C. United | Free |
| September 15, 2010 | (Brazil) Junior Carreiro | (Brazil) Náutico | D.C. United | Free |
| September 15, 2010 | (United States) Colin Clark | Colorado Rapids | Houston Dynamo | Trade |
| September 15, 2010 | (United States) Brian Mullan | Houston Dynamo | Colorado Rapids | Trade |
| September 15, 2010 | (United States) Carey Talley | D.C. United | New York Red Bulls | Trade |
| October 8, 2010 | (United States) Alec Dufty | (United States) AC St. Louis | Chicago Fire | Loan |
| October 8, 2010 | (Guyana) J. P. Rodrigues | (United States) Miami FC | D.C. United | Loan |
