= Michael Lahoud =

Sierra Leonean footballer (born 1986)

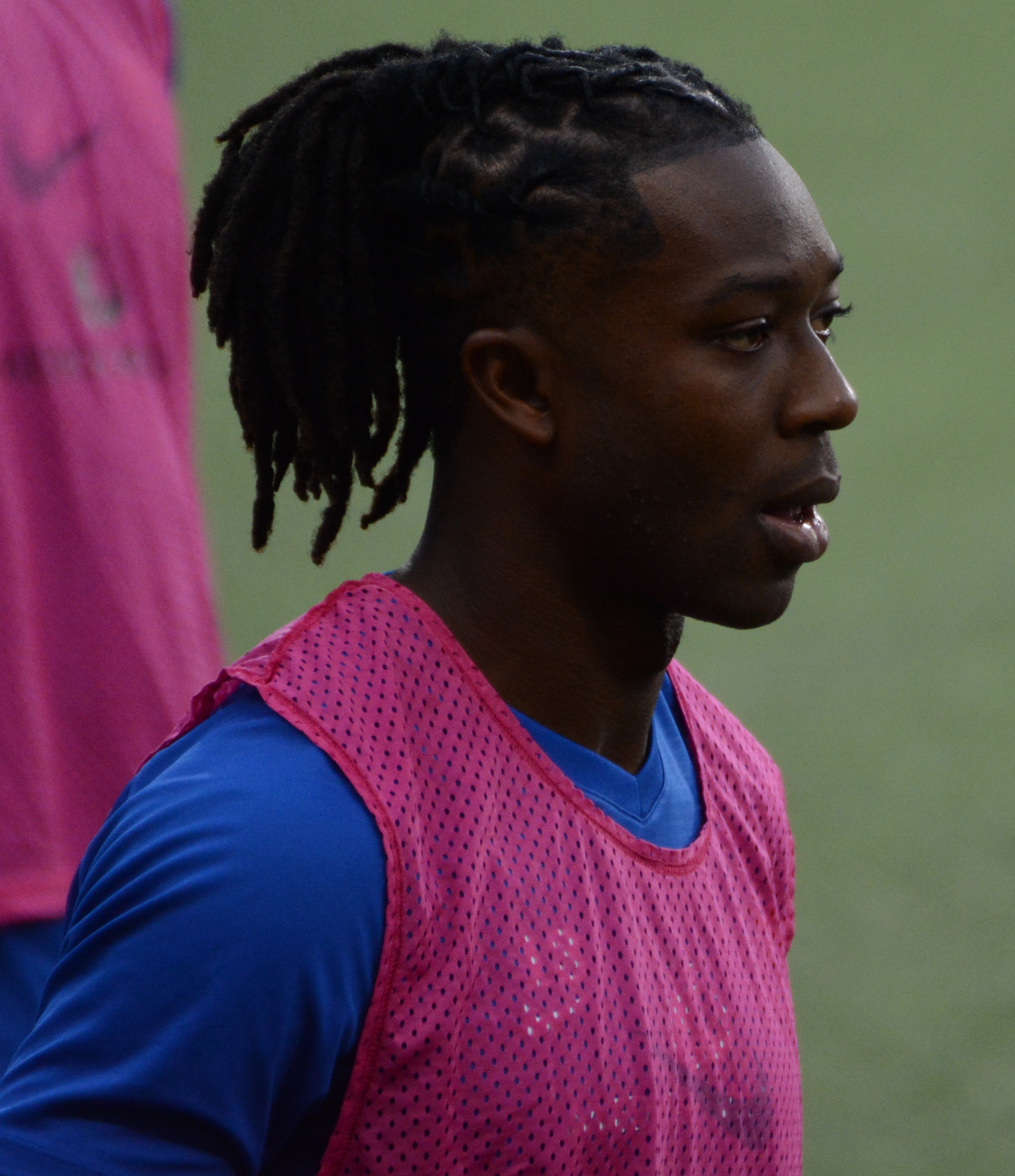
- Lahoud with FC Cincinnati in 2018

Personal information
- Date of birth: September 15, 1986 (age 40)
- Place of birth: Freetown, Sierra Leone
- Height: 5 ft 8 in (1.73 m)
- Position: Midfielder

College career
Years	Team	Apps	(Gls)
2005–2008	Wake Forest Demon Deacons		

Senior career*
Years	Team	Apps	(Gls)
2006–2008	Carolina Dynamo	30	(9)
2009–2012	Chivas USA	64	(2)
2012–2016	Philadelphia Union	58	(0)
2016	→ New York Cosmos (loan)	7	(0)
2016–2017	Miami FC	45	(1)
2018	FC Cincinnati	24	(0)
2019	San Antonio FC	27	(1)

International career^{‡}
2013	Sierra Leone	4	(0)

Managerial career
- 2021–2022: Trinity Tigers (assistant)
- * Club domestic league appearances and goals as of 26 October 2019 ‡ National team caps and goals as of 11 October 2014

Michael Lahoud (born September 15, 1986) is a Sierra Leonean former footballer. He is a broadcaster for CBS Sports Golazo Network, and a former broadcaster for Austin FC.

== Club career ==
=== College ===
Born in Freetown, Lahoud moved from his country to Annandale, Virginia in the United States when he was six years old. He attended Wilbert Tucker Woodson High School in Fairfax, Virginia, and played college soccer at Wake Forest University, playing a total of 95 games. As a freshman forward in 2005, Lahoud was tied for second on the team with seven goals which landed him on the 2005 All ACC Freshman Team as well. He finished with 14 goals and 20 assists in four seasons. He helped win the NCAA National Championship in 2007, and final four appearances in 2006 and 2008. In 2008, he was named to the All-ACC Second Team. Lahoud is ranked in a tie for second in career games played at Wake Forest with 95 and fourth in career games started with 89.

During his college years Lahoud also played with Carolina Dynamo in the USL Premier Development League.

=== Professional ===
Lahoud was drafted in the first round (9th overall) of the 2009 MLS SuperDraft by Chivas USA. He made his professional debut on 21 March 2009, in Chivas's first game of the 2009 MLS season against Colorado Rapids. He played in 16 games (nine starts) with one goal and one assist. His first MLS goal was on Oct. 25, 2009 vs Houston in the 59th minute. Scored his first goal as a profession in the SuperLiga match on June 20, 2009, against Tigres UANL. On September 14, 2010, Chivas USA beat CD Guadalajara and won the ChivaClásico Trophy following a penalty kick shootout after both sides ended scoreless in regulation. Michael Lahoud buried the final penalty to give the American Red-and-Whites a 4–2 victory. He was awarded the MVP Trophy.

On May 17, 2012, Lahoud was traded to the Philadelphia Union in exchange for Danny Califf.

On January 12, 2016, Lahoud joined NASL side New York Cosmos on a season-long loan. Lahoud's loan was cut short on May 24, 2016, when he was sold to NASL side Miami FC for a reported $300,000.

Lahoud joined United Soccer League side FC Cincinnati on April 18, 2018.

== International career ==
Lahoud received his first international call for Sierra Leone in late August 2013 for their 2014 FIFA World Cup qualification match against Equatorial Guinea despite not having been to Sierra Leone since 1993. Lahoud made his international debut in the match, a 3–2 victory for Sierra Leone, after being substituted in for the final 15 minutes of the match.

== Managerial career ==
In January 2021, Lahoud joined the coaching staff of Trinity University in San Antonio.

== Personal life ==
Lahoud also holds American citizenship.

=== Volunteer work ===
Lahoud was the August recipient of MLS W.O.R.K.S. Humanitarian of the Month honor in 2010 for his efforts with HIV prevention through The Wall Memorias Project. He threw out the ceremonial first pitch at the Los Angeles Dodgers and Colorado Rockies game at Dodger Stadium on September 17, 2010. Alongside former Chivas USA teammate Justin Braun he volunteers and mentors the Compton United Soccer Club.

In March 2011, Lahoud created a charity event "Schools for Salone" that helps schools in Sierra Leone.

In July 2011, Lahoud posed for the NOH8 campaign, which raises awareness for gay rights.

In December 2015, Lahoud and national teammate and fellow-MLS player Kei Kamara were the co-recipients of the 2015 FIFPro Merit Award for their efforts in creating a school for children displaced by civil war in their native Sierra Leone.

== Honours ==
=== Wake Forest University ===
- Washington Post All Met Player of the Year: 2005
- All-ACC Freshman Team: 2005
- ACC Player of the Week: 2007
- NCAA Men's Division I Soccer Championship (1): 2007

=== Individual ===
- FIFPro Merit Award: 2015

=== FC Cincinnati ===
- USL Regular Season Championship: (Note: Known since 2023 as the Players' Shield) 2018
