= Michael Umaña =

Costa Rican footballer (born 1982)

Míchael Umaña
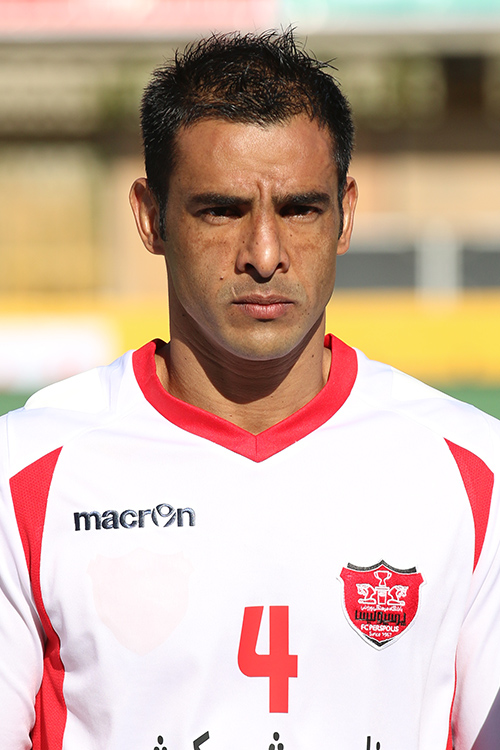
- Umaña with Persepolis in 2015

Personal information
- Full name: Míchael Umaña Corrales
- Date of birth: 16 July 1982 (age 44)
- Place of birth: Santa Ana, Costa Rica
- Height: 1.78 m (5 ft 10 in)
- Position: Centre-back

Senior career*
Years	Team	Apps	(Gls)
1999–2003	Carmelita	82	(5)
2003–2007	Herediano	85	(3)
2005	→ LA Galaxy (loan)	14	(0)
2006	→ Brujas (loan)	11	(1)
2007–2010	Liberia Mía	76	(5)
2010–2011	Chivas USA	50	(1)
2012	Comunicaciones	46	(3)
2013–2014	Saprissa	51	(4)
2014–2016	Persepolis	39	(0)
2016	Liberia	5	(0)
2016–2017	Alajuelense	31	(3)
2017	Cartaginés	3	(0)
2017	Pars Jonoubi Jam	7	(1)
2018	Cartaginés	16	(0)
2018–2021	Comunicaciones	91	(2)
2021	Santos de Guápiles	10	(0)
Total		617	(28)

International career
2003–2004	Costa Rica Olympic	10	(0)
2004–2017	Costa Rica	102	(1)
- * Club domestic league appearances and goals

Míchael Umaña Corrales (born 16 July 1982) is a Costa Rican former professional footballer who played as a defender. He made over 100 appearances for the Costa Rica national team.

== Club career ==
=== Early career ===
Born in Santa Ana, Umaña played for Carmelita and Herediano in his native Costa Rica before coming to the United States in 2005 to play on loan in Major League Soccer with Los Angeles Galaxy.

Umaña was released by Galaxy after the 2005 season after an unsuccessful campaign, and returned to Costa Rica to play for Brujas. He moved back to Herediano in 2006, but asked the club to be transferlisted after a move to Israeli side MS Ironi Ashdod fell through.

He eventually transferred to Liberia Mia in 2007, where he spent the next three seasons.

=== Chivas USA ===
After winning the 2009 Torneo Verano of the Primera División de Costa Rica in with Liberia Mia, Umaña returned to the United States in 2010 to play for his former club's cross-town rivals, Chivas USA. Umaña scored his first goal with Chivas USA in a Superliga 2010 match against Puebla. Umaña spent the 2010 and 2011 seasons with Chivas USA.

=== Central America ===
In January 2012, after his release from Chivas, he signed with Guatemalan side Comunicaciones and a year later he returned to Costa Rica to play for Saprissa.

=== Persepolis ===
On 17 August 2014, Umaña joined Persepolis after passing medical tests, thus became the inaugural Costa Rican footballer to play in Iran. He signed a two-year contract with the club and was given the number 4 shirt. He made his debut for the club on 25 August in a 1–1 draw against Padideh.

== International career ==
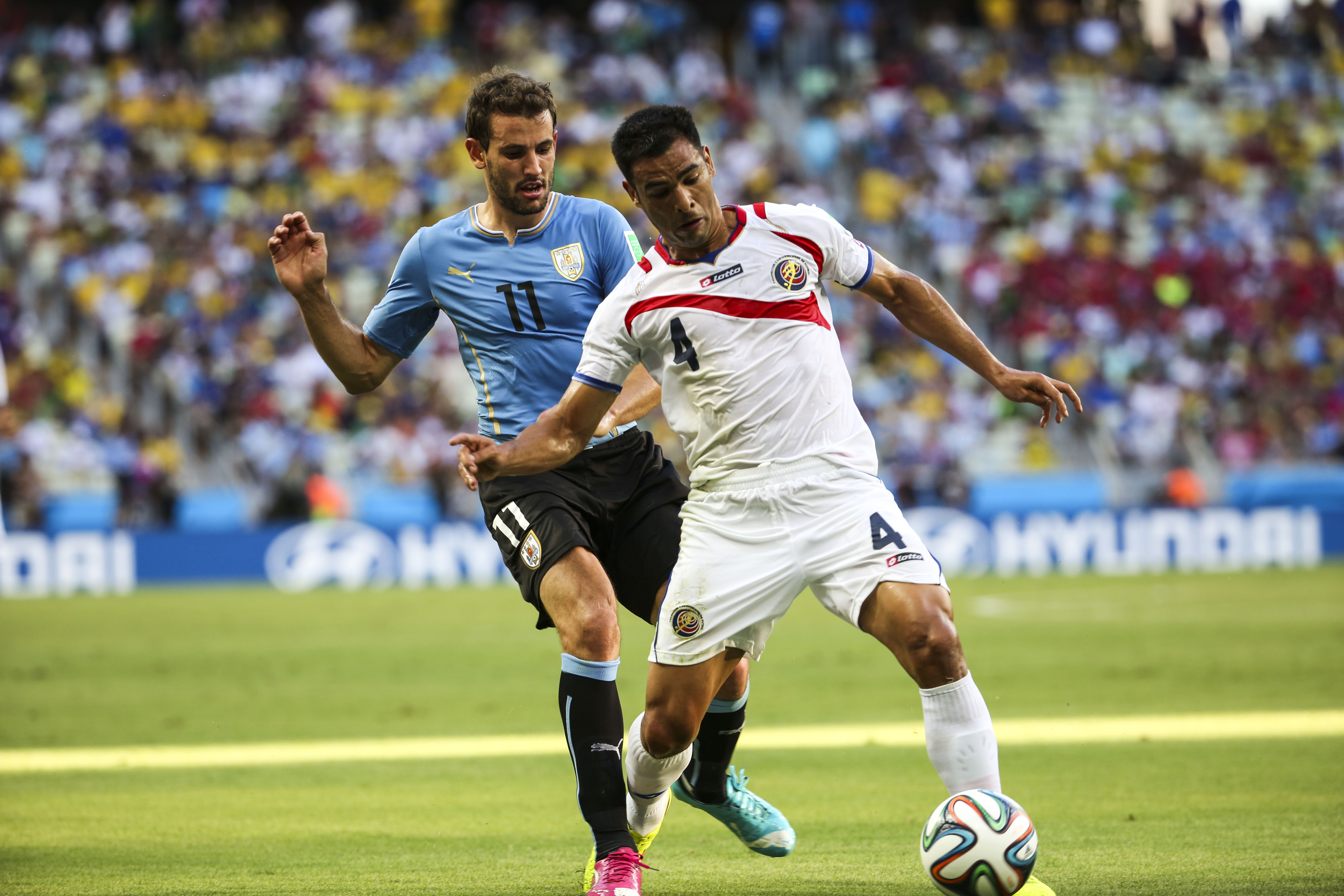
Umaña playing against Uruguay at the 2014 FIFA World Cup

Umaña played for the Costa Rica national team at various youth levels, and was part of their squad at the 2004 Summer Olympics.

He made his senior debut in a June 2004 friendly match against Nicaragua and has, as of October 2017, earned a total of 103 caps, scoring one goal. He played at the 2005 UNCAF Nations Cup and the 2005 CONCACAF Gold Cup before becoming part of the senior squad for the 2006 FIFA World Cup qualification campaign. He played in all three of Costa Rica's group matches at the 2006 FIFA World Cup, as the team was eliminated without winning a point.

In June 2014, Umaña was named in Costa Rica's squad for the 2014 FIFA World Cup. In the team's first two group matches, he and his central defensive colleagues Giancarlo González and Óscar Duarte allowed only one goal as Los Ticos beat Uruguay (3–1) and Italy (1–0) to qualify for the knockout stage. During the round of 16, Umaña converted Costa Rica's decisive fifth kick in a 5–3 penalty shoot-out defeat of Greece. In the quarter-final against the Netherlands, Umaña was one of two Costa Ricans to have his kick saved by Tim Krul in a 3–4 shoot-out loss.

== Personal life ==
Umaña is the youngest of three brothers; his brother Erick played in the Costa Rican second division.

== Career statistics ==
=== Club ===
As of 6 November 2015

Appearances and goals by club, season and competition
Club	Season	League			Cup (Note: Includes U.S. Open Cup and Hazfi Cup.)		Continental (Note: Includes UNCAF Interclub Cup, North American SuperLiga, CONCACAF Champions League and AFC Champions League.)		Total	
Club	Season	Division	Apps	Goals	Apps	Goals	Apps	Goals	Apps	Goals
Carmelita	1999–2000	Costa Rican Primera División	3	0	–		–		3	0
Carmelita	2000–01	Costa Rican Primera División	10	0	–		–		10	0
Carmelita	2001–02	Costa Rican Primera División	40	4	–		–		40	4
Carmelita	2002–03	Costa Rican Primera División	29	1	–		–		29	1
Carmelita	Total		82	5	–		–		82	5
Herediano	2003–04	Costa Rican Primera División	31	1	–		–		31	1
Herediano	2004–05	Costa Rican Primera División	16	2	–		3	1	19	3
Herediano	2006–07	Costa Rican Primera División	38	0	–		–		38	0
Herediano	Total		85	3	–		3	1	88	4
LA Galaxy (loan)	2005	Major League Soccer	14	0	1	0	–		15	0
Brujas (loan)	2005–06	Costa Rican Primera División	11	1	–		–		11	1
Liberia Mía	2007–08	Costa Rican Primera División	29	1	–		–		29	1
Liberia Mía	2008–09	Costa Rican Primera División	34	3	–		–		34	3
Liberia Mía	2009–10	Costa Rican Primera División	13	1	–		2	1	15	2
Liberia Mía	Total		76	5	–		2	1	78	6
Chivas USA	2010	Major League Soccer	28	1	3	0	2	1	33	2
Chivas USA	2011	Major League Soccer	22	0	0	0	–		22	0
Chivas USA	Total		50	1	3	0	2	1	55	2
Comunicaciones	2011–12	Liga Nacional de Guatemala	20	2	–		–		20	2
Comunicaciones	2012–13	Liga Nacional de Guatemala	26	1	–		–		26	1
Comunicaciones	Total		46	3	–		–		46	3
Saprissa	2012–13	Costa Rican Primera División	14	2	–		–		14	2
Saprissa	2013–14	Costa Rican Primera División	37 (Note: Includes four matches in league play-offs.)	2	–		–		37	2
Saprissa	Total		51	4	–		–		51	4
Persepolis	2014–15	Persian Gulf Pro League	24	0	3	0	8	0	35	0
Persepolis	2015–16	Persian Gulf Pro League	15	0	1	0	–		16	0
Persepolis	Total		39	0	4	0	8	0	51	0
Career total			454	22	8	0	15	3	477	25

=== International ===
Appearances and goals by national team and year
National team	Year	Apps	Goals
Costa Rica
Costa Rica	2004	1	0
Costa Rica	2005	15	0
Costa Rica	2006	6	0
Costa Rica	2007	7	0
Costa Rica	2008	1	0
Costa Rica	2009	13	0
Costa Rica	2010	2	0
Costa Rica	2011	7	0
Costa Rica	2012	7	0
Costa Rica	2013	19	1
Costa Rica	2014	10	0
Costa Rica	2015	4	0
Costa Rica	2016	2	0
Costa Rica	2017	8	0
Total		102	1

Scores and results list Costa Rica's goal tally first.

No.	Date	Venue	Opponent	Score	Result	Competition
1.	26 March 2013	Estadio Nacional, San José, Costa Rica	Jamaica	1–0	2–0	2014 FIFA World Cup qualification

== Honours ==
Los Angeles Galaxy

- U.S. Open Cup: 2005
- MLS Cup: 2005
- Western Conference Championship: 2005

Individual

- CONCACAF Gold Cup Best XI (Honorable Mention): 2005

== See also ==
- List of men's footballers with 100 or more international caps
