= Justin Braun (soccer) =

American soccer player (born 1987)

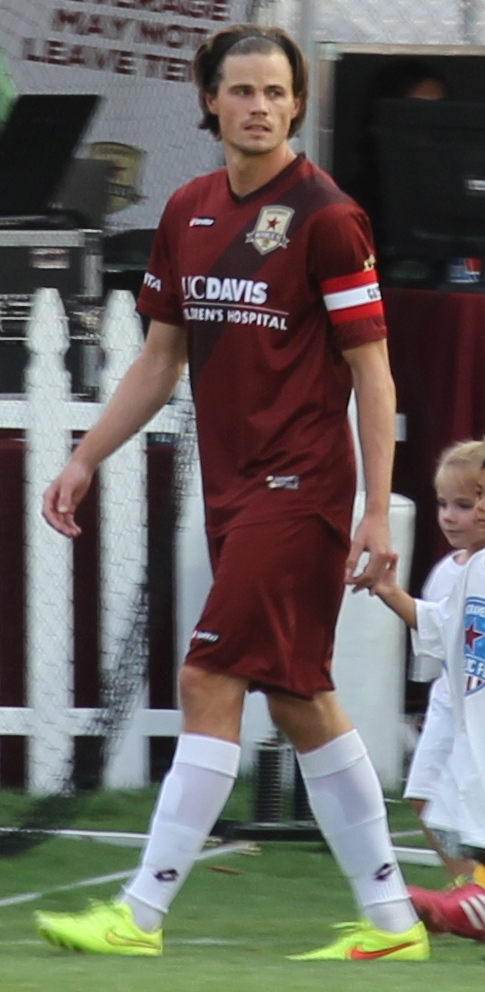

Personal information
- Full name: Justin Braun
- Date of birth: March 31, 1987 (age 39)
- Place of birth: Salt Lake City, Utah, U.S.
- Height: 6 ft 3 in (1.91 m)
- Position: Forward

Youth career
- 2004–2007: SLCC Bruins
- 2007–2008: Olympique Montreux

Senior career*
Years	Team	Apps	(Gls)
2008–2011	Chivas USA	96	(24)
2012	Montreal Impact	12	(0)
2012	Real Salt Lake	2	(0)
2013	Toronto FC	21	(2)
2014–2015	Sacramento Republic	43	(12)
2016–2018	Indy Eleven	58	(18)
Total		235	(56)
- * Club domestic league appearances and goals as of October 13, 2018

Justin Braun (born March 31, 1987) is an American former professional soccer player who played as a forward.

== Career ==
=== Youth and amateur ===
Braun had an accomplished career at Skyline High School in Salt Lake City, where he was named to the All-State first team in his junior and senior years, and to the second team his second year, as well as being the leading scorer in the state during his last two years at the school. While playing at Skyline High, he was given the nickname, "The Man with the Golden Foot." Braun played college soccer for Salt Lake Community College, but was not drafted by Major League Soccer.

While playing for Olympique Montreux, a men's amateur team in the Salt Lake City area, Braun was invited to be part of the Utah Select Team which took part in the 2008 George F. Donnelly Cup, an amateur tournament organized by the United States Adult Soccer Association (USASA), which was held at The Home Depot Center in January 2008. Braun was spotted by Chivas USA head coach Preki and was invited to preseason with the Major League Soccer side; he was subsequently offered a development contract, and signed for Chivas in March 2008.

=== Professional ===
Braun made his professional debut for Chivas as substitute in the 73rd minute of a 1–1 draw with FC Dallas on March 30, 2008. He made 24 appearances – including 12 starts – during his rookie season. He finished with four goals and two assists in the regular season, and added another goal in the playoffs.

His second season in the MLS was marred by a concussion that limited him to 15 matches. He managed 3 goals and 2 assists. Braun rebounded nicely in his third season (2010): he emerged as Chivas USA's top striker, tallying a team-high 9 goals along with 3 assists. He picked up his first MLS Player of the Week award after scoring two goals against the Kansas City Wizards in Week 15. On May 15, 2011, Justin Braun scored a hat trick against the New York Red Bulls, in a game which Chivas USA went on to win 3–2. On July 23, 2011, Justin Braun scored his second hat trick against the Houston Dynamo at the Home Depot Center.

Braun was traded by Chivas USA with Gerson Mayen to expansion side Montreal Impact for defender James Riley and allocation money on November 23, 2011. On Wednesday, July 11, 2012, Braun was traded by the Montreal Impact to Real Salt Lake for a conditional pick in the 2014 MLS SuperDraft, sending Braun back to his home state, but his stay there would be a short and unproductive one.

On December 3, 2012, Braun was traded again, this time moving to Toronto FC in exchange for Aaron Maund. Braun made his debut as a second-half substitute for John Bostock against FC Dallas on April 6, twelve minutes after coming on Braun scored his first goal for the team helping earn a 2–2 home draw.

Braun was released by Toronto at the end of the 2013 MLS season, but was later signed by USL Pro club Sacramento Republic FC on February 11, 2014.

After two seasons in Sacramento, Braun signed with North American Soccer League club Indy Eleven.

== International ==
On December 22, 2010, Braun received his first call up to train with the senior US national team. Training in Carson, California began for Braun and the other players called up on January 4, 2011, leading up to a friendly match against Chile national football team, although he ultimately did not feature in the game. He then received his second call up to the US national team, but had to leave camp due to a cut near his achilles tendon, which needed stitches. This didn't leave him with enough time to recover in order to make his first international appearance for the game against Chile, on January 22, 2011.

== Career statistics ==
As of October 13, 2018

Club	Season	League			Cup		Continental		Playoffs		Total	
Club	Season	Division	Apps	Goals	Apps	Goals	Apps	Goals	Apps	Goals	Apps	Goals
Chivas USA	2008	MLS	24	4	0	0	1	0	2 (Note: Appearances in the MLS Cup Playoffs)	1	27	5
Chivas USA	2009	MLS	15	3	0	0	–		2	0	17	3
Chivas USA	2010	MLS	28	9	2	2	1	0	–		31	11
Chivas USA	2011	MLS	29	8	0	0	–		–		29	8
Chivas USA	Total		96	24	2	2	2	0	4	1	104	27
Montreal Impact	2012	MLS	12	0	1	0	–		–		13	0
Real Salt Lake	2012	MLS	2	0	0	0	0	0	0	0	2	0
Toronto FC	2013	MLS	21	2	1	0	–		–		22	2
Sacramento Republic	2014	USL	19	4	2	2	–		2 (Note: Appearances in the USL Cup Playoffs)	0	23	6
Sacramento Republic	2015	USL	24	8	1	0	–		1	0	26	8
Sacramento Republic	Total		43	12	3	2	0	0	3	0	49	14
Indy Eleven	2016	NASL	25	8	2	1	–		2 (Note: Appearances in the Soccer Bowl Playoffs)	0	29	9
Indy Eleven	2017	NASL	16	7	1	0	–		–		17	7
Indy Eleven	2018	USL	17	3	1	0	–		0	0	18	3
Indy Eleven	Total		58	18	4	1	0	0	2	0	64	19
Career total			232	56	11	5	2	0	9	1	254	62
