= Ben Zemanski =

American soccer player and coach

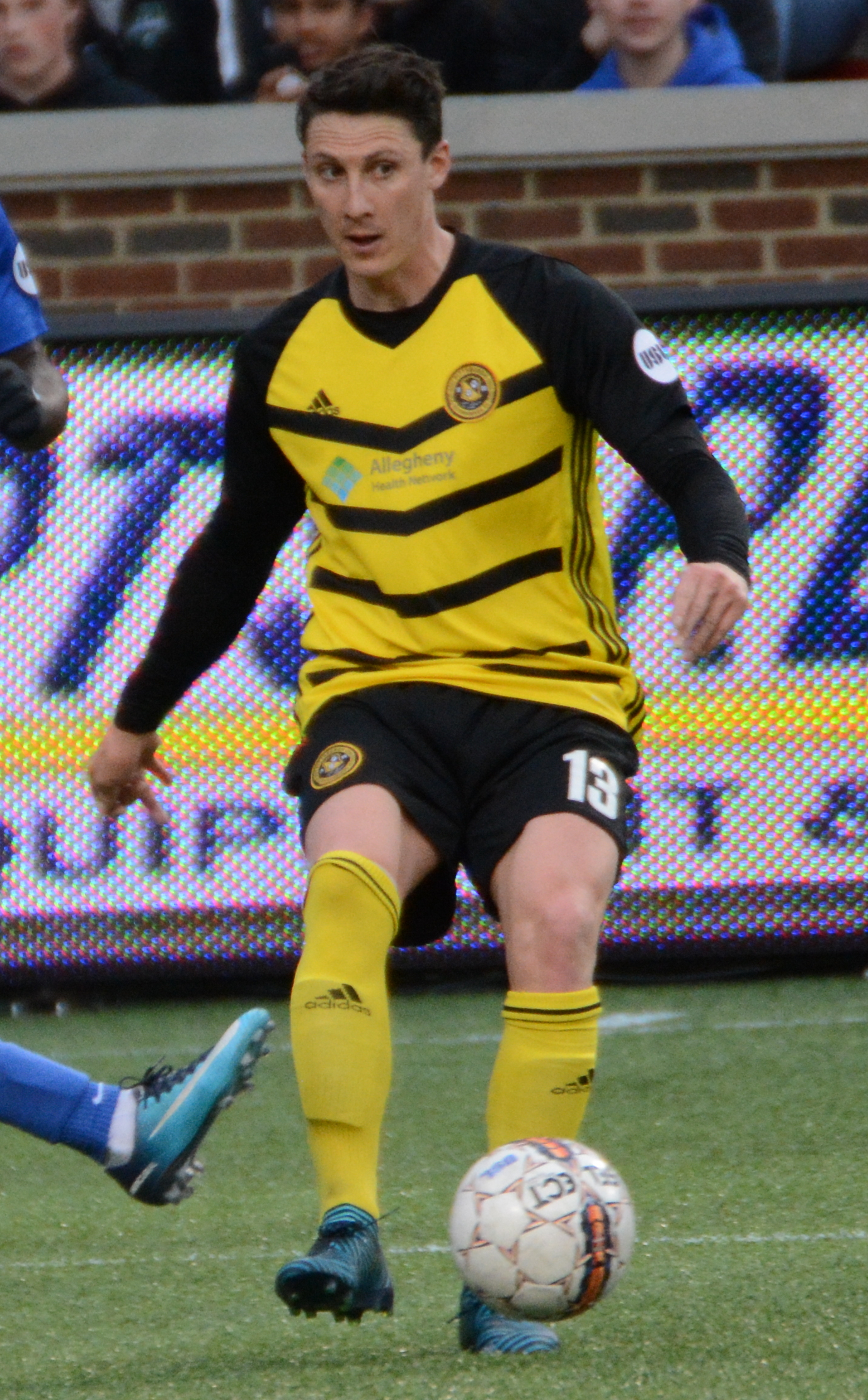
- Zemanski playing for Pittsburgh Riverhounds in 2018

Personal information
- Full name: Benjamin Zemanski
- Date of birth: May 12, 1988 (age 38)
- Place of birth: Pittsburgh, Pennsylvania, United States
- Height: 5 ft 11 in (1.80 m)
- Position: Midfielder

Youth career
- 2006–2009: Akron Zips

Senior career*
Years	Team	Apps	(Gls)
2008–2009	Cleveland Internationals	24	(5)
2010–2012	Chivas USA	72	(2)
2013–2017	Portland Timbers	61	(1)
2017	→ Portland Timbers 2 (loan)	1	(0)
2018	Pittsburgh Riverhounds SC	24	(2)

Managerial career
- 2019–: Portland Pilots (assistant)
- * Club domestic league appearances and goals as of 14:06, 15 October 2018 (UTC)

Ben Zemanski (born May 12, 1988, in Pittsburgh, Pennsylvania) is an American retired soccer player and current assistant coach for the Portland Pilots.

== Career ==
=== College and amateur ===
Zemanski attended the Cuyahoga Valley Christian Academy, where he was a 2005 NSCAA All-American, and played college soccer at the University of Akron. He was named the Zips' Newcomer of the Year in 2006, was named to the All-MAC Second Team and was an Academic All-MAC honoree as a junior in 2008, and was named to the CoSida Academic All-America Third Team, the All-Mid-American Conference Second Team, the MAC Academic Team, and was one of ten finalists for the Lowe's Senior CLASS Award as a senior in 2009.

During his college years Zemanski also played for the Cleveland Internationals in the USL Premier Development League.

=== Professional ===
Zemanski was drafted in the third round (forty-seventh overall) of the 2010 MLS SuperDraft by Chivas USA. He made his professional debut on April 17, 2010, in a game against Houston Dynamo, and scored his first professional goal on the opening day of the 2011 MLS season, a 3–2 defeat to Sporting Kansas City.

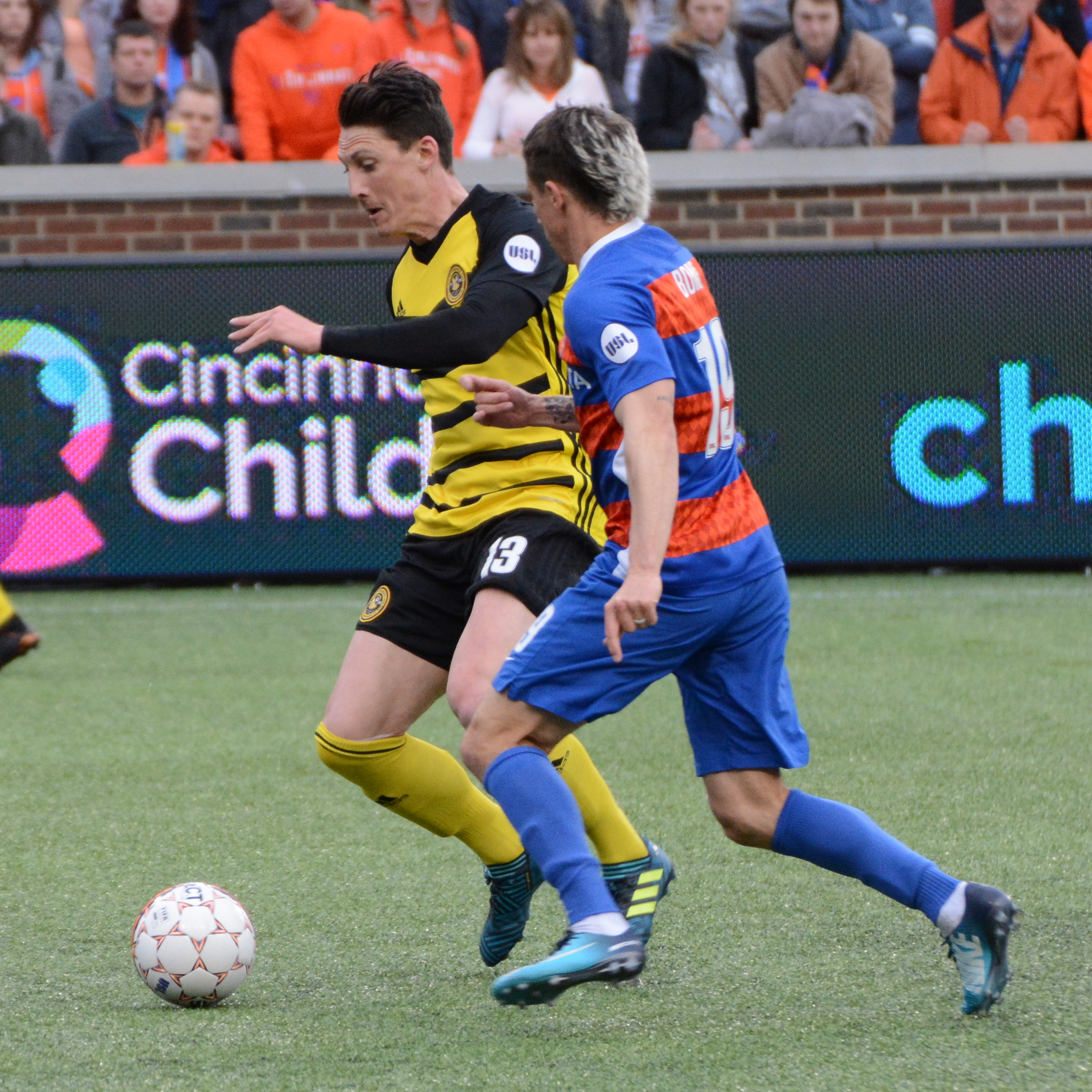
Zemanski fending off FC Cincinnati's Corben Bone in a 2018 match

On March 5, 2018, Zemanski signed with Pittsburgh Riverhounds of the United Soccer League for a one-year contract.

On May 26, 2019, Zemanski announced his retirement from professional soccer.

== Coaching ==
Three days after announcing his retirement, Zemanski was announced as an assistant coach for the Portland Pilots.

== Honors ==
=== Club ===
Portland Timbers

- MLS Cup: 2015
- Western Conference (playoffs): 2015
- Western Conference (regular season): 2013
