= Chukwudi Chijindu =

American soccer player

Personal information
- Full name: Chukwudi Ibegbunaneke Chijindu
- Date of birth: February 20, 1986 (age 40)
- Place of birth: Upland, California, United States
- Height: 5 ft 10 in (1.78 m)
- Position: Forward

Youth career
- 2004–2007: Connecticut Huskies

Senior career*
Years	Team	Apps	(Gls)
2009–2011	Chivas USA	23	(2)
2010	→ Miami FC (loan)	7	(1)
2011	→ Los Angeles Blues (loan)	16	(4)
2012	Wilmington Hammerheads	10	(0)
2012–2014	Thór	38	(15)
2015	Keflavík	8	(0)
- * Club domestic league appearances and goals as of October 21, 2014

Chukwudi Ibegbunaneke 'Chuck' Chijindu (born February 20, 1986) is an American professional soccer player.

== Career ==
=== Youth ===
A native of Fontana, California, Chijindu attended Damien High School in La Verne, California, He was a 4-year Varsity letterman and full starter as a freshman. He led his team in scoring his junior and senior seasons, and was the team MVP as well as a 2-time Sierra League MVP. Chijindu was also an All-America Top 100 pick. He played NCAA Div-1 college soccer at the University of Connecticut winning several Big East titles and All-Conference personal accolades. He led his team in scoring in his freshman, sophomore, and senior years- finishing his college career with 26 goals and 19 assists in 86 career matches.

=== Professional ===
After being invited to join Chivas USA for preseason camp in 2008, Chijindu showed well throughout and was offered a contract but in the end did not come to terms. Chivas USA would retain his rights. After other MLS sides expressed interest in his services, he would return to Chivas USA as they had first right of refusal due to discovery claim rule. On April 5, 2009, Chijindu signed a senior developmental contract with Chivas USA. He made his professional debut on 11 April 2009, in Chivas's game against Los Angeles Galaxy, and just one week later would score his first professional goal on 18 April 2009 against Seattle Sounders FC.

On August 6, 2010, Chivas USA sent Chijindu, along with teammate Gerson Mayen, on loan to USSF Division 2 Professional League side Miami FC

On March 23, 2011 Chivas USA sent Chijindu on loan to first year newcomers USL Pro side Los Angeles Blues. He would lead his team to the a playoff berth in their inaugural season as a professional club.

Chijindu's loan with LA Blues ended at the close of the 2011 USL Pro season and his rights reverted to Chivas USA. At the end of the MLS season his 2012 contract option was declined by the club and Chijindu entered the 2011 MLS Re-Entry Draft. He was not selected in the draft and became a free agent. Chijindu signed with USL Pro club Wilmington Hammerheads in April, 2012.

After a brief stint with Wilmington, Chijindu was released from his contract to sign with Icelandic club Thor midway through their season and showed extremely well. During the 2013 Úrvalsdeild, Chijindu scored a team-high 10 goals, good for fifth in the league. He attracted interest from the biggest clubs in Iceland as well as bigger leagues across Europe and Scandinavia but would return. He would depart the club in December 2014 after having played nearly 3 seasons, appearing 38 times and scoring 15 league goals.

He returned to Icelandic football for struggling side Keflavik FC in 2015 Úrvalsdeild in the July 2015 transfer window but failed to score in 8 matches for the club.
