= Maykel Galindo =

Cuban footballer (born 1981)

Personal information
- Full name: Maykel Galindo Castañeda
- Date of birth: January 28, 1981 (age 45)
- Place of birth: Villa Clara, Cuba
- Height: 5 ft 10 in (1.78 m)
- Position: Forward

Senior career*
Years	Team	Apps	(Gls)
2001–2005	Villa Clara	87	(31)
2005–2006	Seattle Sounders	10	(4)
2007–2010	Chivas USA	67	(18)
2010	→ FC Tampa Bay (loan)	10	(2)
2011	FC Dallas	6	(0)
2012–2013	Los Angeles Blues	21	(1)
Total		201	(56)

International career^{‡}
2002–2005	Cuba	35	(12)
- * Club domestic league appearances and goals as of August 18, 2014 ‡ National team caps and goals as of October 27, 2009

Maykel Galindo Castañeda (born January 28, 1981, in Villa Clara) is a Cuban former professional footballer.

== Career ==
=== International ===
A rising star in the youth ranks of the Cuba national team, he made his debut in a January 2002 friendly match against Guatemala. Galindo then made the senior squad for the 2005 CONCACAF Gold Cup, to be played in the United States. He has earned a total of 35 caps, scoring 12 goals. He represented his country in 3 FIFA World Cup qualifying matches and played at 3 CONCACAF Gold Cup final tournaments.

=== Defection ===
After scoring in a 3–1 loss to Costa Rica, Galindo sought asylum in the United States and successfully defected in Seattle, Washington.

In an interview with Irish radio show Team 33 on Newstalk, he said of his defection: "I made my decision when I went to United States and thought 'I'm not going back to Cuba'. I remember when I called my Mum, I said 'Mum, I'm not going back. I'm going to stay here, fighting'. She's crying but at the end of the day, she said 'You're my son, you're going to be alone over there. Take care, we support you with whatever you do'. And it's been almost 12 years."

He confirmed that he had made his first visit to Cuba for more than 11 years in the Autumn of 2016.

=== Professional ===
Galindo signed with Seattle Sounders of the USL First Division in 2005 but struggled through injuries during his two seasons there. He then signed with Chivas USA of Major League Soccer prior to the 2007 season and became a regular starter for Chivas. On April 21, 2007, Galindo scored two goals in the first ten minutes of the match in a 4–0 win over Real Salt Lake. He remained with the club through the 2010 season, though he was briefly loaned to FC Tampa Bay of the USSF Division 2 Professional League in 2010.

A new regime hired by Chivas USA before the 2011 season deemed Galindo expendable and his contract option was declined on January 21, 2011. He spent the 2011 preseason training with FC Dallas though Chivas USA still held his rights. FC Dallas finally traded a Supplemental draft pick for his rights and signed him on April 1, 2011.

Galindo stayed with FC Dallas for the 2011 campaign. At season's end, the club declined his 2012 contract option, and he entered the 2011 MLS Re-Entry Draft. Galindo was not selected in the draft and became a free agent.

== Honours ==
=== Seattle Sounders ===
- USL First Division Champion (1): 2005
