= Jesús Padilla =

American soccer player (born 1987)

Personal information
- Full name: Jesús Andrés Padilla Cisneros
- Date of birth: March 3, 1987 (age 39)
- Place of birth: San Jose, California, United States
- Height: 6 ft 1 in (1.85 m)
- Position: Forward

Youth career
- 2001–2006: Guadalajara

Senior career*
Years	Team	Apps	(Gls)
2006–2014	Guadalajara	31	(1)
2008–2009	→ Tapatio (loan)	5	(6)
2009–2010	→ Chivas USA (loan)	37	(7)
2011–2012	→ La Piedad (loan)	28	(7)
2013	→ La Piedad (loan)	16	(1)
2013	→ Dorados (loan)	12	(2)
2014	→ Ballenas Galeana (loan)	12	(1)
2015	Sonora	3	(0)
- * Club domestic league appearances and goals as of November 14, 2015 Duarte FC

Jesús Andrés Padilla Cisneros (Note: In this Spanish name, the first or paternal surname is Padilla and the second or maternal family name is Cisneros.) (born March 3, 1987) is an American former soccer player who played as a striker.

== Career ==
Padilla was born and raised in San Jose, California and moved to Guadalajara with his parents when he was fourteen. He joined the youth academy of Guadalajara in 2001 and, having been a part of the academy system for five years, made his professional debut on August 8, 2006, in a 1–0 loss to Deportivo Toluca.

Padilla moved on loan to sister club Chivas USA of Major League Soccer on August 17, 2009. He remained with Chivas USA until the club declined his contract option on March 11, 2011.

In June 2011, he was loaned to CF La Piedad in Mexico. He scored eight goals in twenty-nine matches in Liga de Ascenso.

Padilla remained with Guadalajara for the Apertura of the 2012-13 Liga MX season. He made seven appearances, five of them as a substitute, in addition to a CONCACAF Champions League appearance. He was loaned to Piedad again for the Clasura portion of the season.

=== Nationality issue ===
Although he was born in the United States, according to Article 30 of the Mexican Constitution, he was born Mexican as he is the son of Mexicans born in a foreign country. Chivas owner Jorge Vergara's take on the nationality question is simple: "We go by the definition in the Constitution," Vergara says. "Mexican law says that you are a Mexican if you are born outside Mexico and both parents are Mexican."

== Career statistics ==
Club performance			League		Cup		League Cup		Continental		Total	
Season	Club	League	Apps	Goals	Apps	Goals	Apps	Goals	Apps	Goals	Apps	Goals
Mexico			League		Cup		League Cup		North America		Total	
2006–07	Guadalajara	Primera División	2	0	-	-	-	-	-	-	2	0
2007–08	Guadalajara	Primera División	11	0	-	-	-	-	-	-	11	0
2008–09	Universidad de Guadalajara (loan)	Primera División A	11	0	-	-	-	-	-	-	11	0
2008–09	Guadalajara	Primera División de México	13	2	-	-	-	-	-	-	13	2
USA			League		Open Cup		League Cup		North America		Total	
2009	Chivas USA (loan)	Major League Soccer	11	1	3	2	2	0	-	-	16	3
2010	Chivas USA (loan)	Major League Soccer	26	6	0	0	-	-	-	-	26	6
Mexico			League		Cup		League Cup		North America		Total	
2011–12	CF La Piedad (loan)	Liga de Ascenso	28	8	-	-	1	1	-	-	29	8
2012–13	Guadalajara	Liga MX	7	0	-	-	-	-	1	0	8	0
2012–13	La Piedad	Ascenso MX	16	1	2	0	-	-	-	-	18	1
2013–14	Dorados	Ascenso MX	12	2	6	2	-	-	-	-	18	4
Total	Mexico		100	13	8	2	1	1	1	0	110	16
Total	USA		37	7	3	2	2	0	0	0	42	9
Career total			137	20	11	4	3	1	1	0	152	25
