= Mariano Trujillo =

Mexican footballer (born 1977)

Personal information
- Full name: Edgar Mariano Trujillo Reyes
- Date of birth: May 19, 1977 (age 49)
- Place of birth: Mexico City, Mexico
- Height: 1.72 m (5 ft 8 in)
- Position: Left-back

Senior career*
Years	Team	Apps	(Gls)
1996–2000	UNAM	48	(1)
2001	Santos Laguna	17	(3)
2001–2003	UNAM	70	(18)
2003–2007	Morelia	125	(13)
2007	Skoda Xanthi	0	(0)
2008	Atlante	23	(0)
2009–2011	Chivas USA	61	(1)
2012–2013	Chiapas	2	(0)

International career
1997	Mexico U20	4	(0)
2003	Mexico	2	(1)
- * Club domestic league appearances and goals

Edgar Mariano Trujillo Reyes (Note: In this Spanish name, the first or paternal surname is Trujillo and the second or maternal family name is Reyes.) (born May 19, 1977) is a Mexican former professional footballer and current analyst for Fox Deportes.

== Career ==
=== Professional ===
Trujillo made his professional debut with UNAM Pumas on October 26, 1996, in a 3–0 win over Toluca. In the Verano 2001 he transferred to Santos Laguna, when Santos won the Verano 2001 championship. Trujillo went back with Pumas in the Invierno 2001, where he would leave until the 2003 Apertura to Monarcas Morelia. With Morelia he would play until the 2007 Clausura, and would feature in more games than with any other team.

In 2007, Trujillo signed a 2-year contract with Skoda Xanthi of Greece, but for personal reasons, he left the team. Trujillo played with Atlante for the Clausura 2008.

He signed for Chivas USA in March 2009, just before the new season. Trujillo started 18 games and made three substitution appearances for Chivas USA in his first season. He became a regular starter for the team in his second year, and inherited Jonathan Bornstein's role as captain when Bornstein was not active.

Trujillo remained with Chivas USA through the 2011 season. At season's end, the club declined his 2012 contract option and he entered the 2011 MLS Re-Entry Draft. Trujillo was not selected in the draft and became a free agent.

Mariano is now a member of Jaguares de Chiapas, Mexican soccer club. No longer an active player, Jose Guadalupe (Jaguares Head Coach) has integrated Mariano to his Coaching Staff upon the 2012 Liga MX season to start July, 20th. Jaguares's coach Jose Guadalupe Cruz saw him play during a training session with the other players so he convinced Mariano Trujillo to be a team player for the Copa Mexico where he gave an assist to Antonio Salazar in a 1–0 win at home against Necaxa on July 24, 2012.

=== International ===
Trujillo played two games with the Mexico national team in 2003, his first against El Salvador in Carson, California. He scored his only international goal in a friendly match against Peru in East Rutherford, New Jersey. Trujillo was also a member of Mexico's U-20 squad at the 1997 World Youth Championship in Malaysia, alongside former Chivas USA forward Eduardo Lillingston.

=== International goals ===
No.	Date	Venue	Opponent	Score	Result	Competition	Ref.
1.	August 20, 2003	Giants Stadium, East Rutherford, United States	Peru	1–3	1–3	Friendly	

== Honours ==
Santos Laguna

- Primera División de México: Verano 2001

Mexico Youth

- Central American and Caribbean Games: Silver medalist
