= Gerson Mayen =

Salvadoran footballer (born 1989)

Personal information
- Full name: Gerson Levi Mayen Villavicencio
- Date of birth: 9 February 1989 (age 37)
- Place of birth: Los Angeles, California, United States
- Height: 5 ft 8 in (1.73 m)
- Position: Midfielder

Team information
- Current team: Zacatecoluca

Youth career
- 2008: Chivas USA

Senior career*
Years	Team	Apps	(Gls)
2008–2011	Chivas USA	20	(0)
2010	→ Miami FC (loan)	9	(0)
2011	→ Fort Lauderdale Strikers (loan)	11	(1)
2012	Los Angeles Misioneros		
2012–2014	FAS	57	(5)
2014–2019	Santa Tecla	211	(39)
2017	→ Cafetaleros de Tapachula (loan)	9	(1)
2020	Cobán Imperial	12	(2)
2020–2024	Águila	161	(21)
2024–2025	Municipal Limeño	38	(3)
2025	Zacatecoluca	21	(5)
2026–	Municipal Limeno	34	(1)

International career^{‡}
2008–2009	United States U20	1	(0)
2013–2021	El Salvador	47	(5)
- * Club domestic league appearances and goals as of 16 September 2026 ‡ National team caps and goals as of 15 June 2021

Gerson Levi Mayen Villavicencio (born 9 February 1989) is a professional footballer who plays as a midfielder for Zacatecoluca. Born in the United States, he plays for the El Salvador national team at international level.

== Career ==
=== Youth ===
Mayen attended Manual Arts High School, and started playing soccer when he was young with a club named Gilbert Lindsay Youth Soccer Club, then with the club soccer with Alta Loma Arsenal where he won four Cal South State Cups, four Regional Championships and three National Championships. Mayen also won two Golden Boot awards. Rather than opting to play collegiate soccer, Mayen joined the Chivas USA U-18 team.

=== Professional ===
Mayen was signed to a full professional contract by Chivas USA on 27 March 2008, after training with the club throughout preseason. He did not make an appearance with the first team in his rookie season, but made 12 appearances in the MLS Reserve Division, playing primarily as a defender and defensive midfielder. He made his professional debut on 29 March 2009, in Chivas's game against FC Dallas.

On 6 August 2010, Chivas USA sent Mayen, along with teammate Chukwudi Chijindu, on loan to USSF Division 2 Professional League side Miami FC. Mayen returned to Florida in July 2011 when he was loaned to NASL club Fort Lauderdale Strikers.

Mayen was traded with Justin Braun to MLS expansion side Montreal Impact for James Riley and allocation money on 23 November 2011. However, Mayen was waived by Montreal on 1 March, prior to the start of the 2012 season.

=== International ===
==== United States ====
Mayen has made one appearance for the United States U-20 men's national soccer team, in the Campos Verdes International Tournament in Portugal in 2008. Mayen was also named to the 2009 Under 20 World Cup in Egypt where he started and played 90 minutes against Germany.

==== El Salvador ====
On July 5, 2011, Mayen was given permission by the FIFA to be part of the El Salvador team. "After a thorough review of the documentation submitted by the Salvadoran Football Federation, the judge concluded that the player Gerson Mayen Villavicencio meets the objective conditions stipulated in Article 18, paragraph 1 of the Regulations Applicable Statutory of the FIFA: in particular, the player Gerson Mayen has never played an international "A" match in an official competition representing the U.S. Soccer Federation," reads the resolution of FIFA. Mayen made his international début at the 2013 Copa Centroamericana, coming on as substitute at the 86' minute in El Salvador 1–1 draw with Honduras.

== Statistics ==
=== International goals ===
Scores and results list El Salvador's goal tally first.

No.	Date	Venue	Opponent	Score	Result	Competition
1.	17 January 2017	Estadio Rommel Fernández, Panama City, Panama	Belize	1–0	3–1	2017 Copa Centroamericana
2.	13 July 2017	Sports Authority Field at Mile High, Denver, United States	Curaçao	1–0	2–0	2017 CONCACAF Gold Cup
3.	13 October 2018	Estadio Cuscatlán, San Salvador, El Salvador	Barbados	3–0	3–0	2019–20 CONCACAF Nations League qualification
4.	25 March 2021	Estadio Cuscatlán, San Salvador, El Salvador	Grenada	1–0	2–0	2022 FIFA World Cup qualification
5.	15 June 2021	Estadio Cuscatlán, San Salvador, El Salvador	Saint Kitts and Nevis	2–0	2–0	2022 FIFA World Cup qualification

== Honours ==
- Santa Tecla
  - Primera División (2): Clausura 2015, Apertura 2016
- Aguila
  - Primera División (1): Apertura 2023
