= Blair Gavin =

American soccer player (born 1989)

Personal information
- Full name: Blair Gavin
- Date of birth: January 8, 1989 (age 37)
- Place of birth: Phoenix, Arizona, U.S.
- Height: 6 ft 0 in (1.83 m)
- Position: Midfielder

Team information
- Current team: New England Revolution (assistant)

Youth career
- 2005–2006: IMG Soccer Academy

College career
Years	Team	Apps	(Gls)
2007–2009	Akron Zips	68	(7)

Senior career*
Years	Team	Apps	(Gls)
2007–2009	Bradenton Academics	38	(4)
2010–2012	Chivas USA	43	(3)
2012	New England Revolution	2	(0)
2013	IMG Academy Bradenton	7	(0)
2013	Seattle Sounders FC	0	(0)
2014	Atlanta Silverbacks	18	(1)
2015	Portland Timbers 2	23	(4)
2016–2017	Phoenix Rising	45	(0)

International career^{‡}
2006–2007	United States U18	5	(0)
2008	United States U20	1	(0)

Managerial career
- 2018–2020: Phoenix Rising (assistant)
- 2022: Columbus Crew (assistant)
- 2023–2024: FC Tulsa
- 2024–: New England Revolution (assistant)
- * Club domestic league appearances and goals as of 22:36, 3 November 2017 (UTC) ‡ National team caps and goals as of August 5, 2012

Blair Gavin (born January 8, 1989) is an American former soccer player who is an assistant coach for Major League Soccer side New England Revolution.

== Career ==
=== College and amateur ===
Gavin grew up in Scottsdale, Arizona, played club soccer for the Sereno soccer club which was ranked No. 1 in the nation and won the Arizona state cup four years in a row, and attended the famed IMG Academy in Bradenton, Florida, before playing college soccer at the University of Akron. While at Akron, Gavin was named to the Great Lakes Region (GLR) third team and was an All-Mid-American Conference (All-MAC) first team honoree as a sophomore in 2008, while in 2009 he was named to the All-MAC First Team and the All-GLR First Team, and recorded the game-winning penalty kick in a shootout against the University of North Carolina to help his team to the 2009 NCAA Division I championship game.

During his college years Gavin also played three seasons for Bradenton Academics in the USL Premier Development League.

=== Professional ===
Gavin was drafted in the first round (10th overall) of the 2010 MLS SuperDraft by Chivas USA. He made his professional debut on April 1, 2010, in a game against Los Angeles Galaxy, and scored his first professional goal - a 20-yard strike from outside the penalty area - in a 4–0 victory over New England Revolution on May 5, 2010.

On August 1, 2012, Gavin, along with a second round pick in the 2013 MLS SuperDraft and allocation money, was traded to New England Revolution in exchange for Shalrie Joseph. Gavin remained with New England through the 2012 season. After the conclusion of the 2012 season, New England declined the 2013 option on Gavin's contract and he entered the 2012 MLS Re-Entry Draft. He became a free agent after going undrafted in both rounds of the draft.

On August 21, 2013, Gavin signed with Seattle Sounders FC after training with the team for several weeks.

=== International ===
Gavin has traveled to tournaments in Slovakia, Spain, Portugal and Mexico with the U-18 squad, and was one of 20 players called into the U-18 training camp in January 2007 as the squad prepared for the 14th Copa Chivas Tournament in Mexico.

=== Coaching career ===
In August 2022, Gavin was named head coach of FC Tulsa in the USL Championship

Gavin joined Caleb Porter's staff at the New England Revolution in January 2024. FC Tulsa received an undisclosed transfer fee in the deal.

== Personal ==
Blair is the younger brother of former Los Angeles Galaxy midfielder Michael Gavin.
