= José Macotelo =

Costa Rican footballer (born 1985)

Personal information
- Full name: José Macotelo Camacho
- Date of birth: July 12, 1985 (age 41)
- Place of birth: San José, Costa Rica
- Height: 5 ft 6 in (1.68 m)
- Position: Midfielder

Team information
- Current team: Carmelita

Senior career*
Years	Team	Apps	(Gls)
2006–2010	Puntarenas	79	(9)
2010	→ Chivas USA (loan)	3	(0)
2010–2011	Brujas	20	(2)
2011–2013	Belén Siglo XXI	37	(3)
2013–	Carmelita	12	(1)
- * Club domestic league appearances and goals as of April 18, 2013

José Macotelo Camacho (born July 12, 1985) is a Costa Rican footballer. He currently plays for Carmelita.

== Career ==
Macotelo started his professional career with Puntarenas of the Primera División. He has made 73 appearances for Puntarenas, beginning with his debut as a second-half substitute against Santos de Guápiles on August 13, 2006.

Macotelo was signed by Chivas USA on loan from Puntarenas on April 30, 2010. His loan was cancelled on July 1, 2010, after he made only a handful of substitute appearances for Chivas USA.
