= Rodolfo Espinoza =

Mexican footballer (born 1981)

Personal information
- Full name: Rodolfo Espinoza Díaz
- Date of birth: 14 June 1981 (age 45)
- Place of birth: Guasave, Mexico
- Height: 1.78 m (5 ft 10 in)
- Position: Midfielder

Senior career*
Years	Team	Apps	(Gls)
2002–2008	Necaxa	78	(9)
2006–2007	→ Atlante (loan)	21	(1)
2008–2009	Chiapas	35	(0)
2009–2010	Universitario	47	(5)
2010	Chivas USA	15	(1)
2011	Sporting Cristal	8	(2)
2012–2013	Correcaminos	20	(0)
2013–2014	Cruz Azul Hidalgo	11	(0)
- * Club domestic league appearances and goals

Rodolfo Espinoza Díaz (born 14 June 1981) is a Mexican former professional footballer who played as a midfielder.

== Honours ==
Mexico U23

- CONCACAF Olympic Qualifying Championship: 2004

Universitario de Deportes

- Torneo Descentralizado: 2009
