= Eduardo Lillingston =

Mexican footballer (born 1977)

Personal information
- Full name: Eduardo Fabián Lillingston García
- Date of birth: 23 December 1977 (age 48)
- Place of birth: Guadalajara, Mexico
- Height: 6 ft 0 in (1.83 m)
- Position: Forward

Senior career*
Years	Team	Apps	(Gls)
1996–1998	Toluca	24	(4)
1999	Santos Laguna	21	(6)
1999	Toluca	8	(0)
2000	Atlas	8	(3)
2000	Toluca	15	(0)
2001	UANL	15	(2)
2001–2003	Santos Laguna	63	(16)
2003–2008	Tecos UAG	108	(24)
2009–2010	Chivas USA	25	(8)
2010	→ Tijuana (loan)	12	(1)
2010	→ Indios (loan)	17	(9)
2011–2013	Estudiantes Tecos	59	(19)
2013–2014	Necaxa	24	(5)

International career
1997	Mexico U20	4	(2)

Managerial career
- 2020: Atlético Jalisco
- * Club domestic league appearances and goals

Eduardo Fabián Lillingston García (born 23 December 1977) is a Mexican former professional footballer, who last played for Necaxa in Ascenso MX.

== Career ==
=== Club ===
Lillingston has spent the majority of his career playing for various Primera División (First Division) teams, including Club Toluca, Santos Laguna, CF Atlas, UANL, and Tecos UAG.

He was signed by Chivas USA on 11 March 2009, then on trial bases with the Los Angeles-based club throughout its 2009 pre-season. Lillingston went on a short-term loan deal with Mexican club Club Tijuana in January, 2010.

=== International ===
Lillingston has represented Mexico at various youth levels. He was a member of Mexico U-20 National team at the 1997 FIFA World Youth Championship in Malaysia, leading his team with three goals in four matches during the tournament.

== Honours ==
Toluca

- Primera División de México: Verano 1998
