= Darío Delgado (footballer, born 1985) =

Costa Rican footballer

Personal information
- Full name: Darío Alejandro Delgado Mora
- Date of birth: 14 December 1985 (age 40)
- Place of birth: Costa Rica
- Height: 6 ft 0 in (1.83 m)
- Position: Defender

Team information
- Current team: Fútbol Consultants
- Number: 2

Youth career
- 1996–2007: Saprissa

Senior career*
| Years | Team | Apps | (Gls) |
| 2007–2012 | Puntarenas | 83 | (5) |
| 2010 | → Chivas USA (loan) | 22 | (0) |
| 2011 | → Guangdong (loan) | 7 | (1) |
| 2012 | Carmelita | 16 | (1) |
| 2013 | Puntarenas | 42 | (2) |
| 2014 | Carmelita | 38 | (3) |
| 2015 | Cartaginés | 34 | (0) |
| 2016–2018 | La U | 90 | (6) |
| 2018–2019 | Sporting | | |
| 2019–2022 | Guadalupe | 117 | (3) |
| 2023– | Fútbol Consultants | | |

International career^{‡}
| 2009–2011 | Costa Rica | 12 | (0) |
- * Club domestic league appearances and goals as of 2 October 2022 ‡ National team caps and goals as of 14 August 2010

Darío Alejandro Delgado Mora (born 14 December 1985) is a Costa Rican professional footballer who plays for Fútbol Consultants.

== Club career ==
During the Clausura 2008 season he debuted in the Costa Rican First Division appearing in 11 games scoring 2 goals. For the 2008–2009 season, he played in 30 games in which he scored 2 goals captaining Puntarenas F.C. During the 2009 Winter Tournament he was recognized by UNAFUT as the league's top player.

In January 2010, it was rumored that he was signed by Major League Soccer team Seattle Sounders FC. In truth, Real Salt Lake had the MLS rights to Delgado. RSL traded these rights to Chivas USA in exchange for a conditional pick in the 2012 MLS SuperDraft. Chivas USA signed Delgado on a season's loan on 4 April 2010.

On 22 January 2011 Chivas USA announced that Delgado would not be part of the club for the 2011 MLS season.

Delgado transferred to Chinese club Guangdong at March 2011. On 11 May 2011, he suffered a fracture of tibia and fibula during a FA Cup match against Tianjin Songjiang, ruling him out for the rest of the 2011 league season.

He ended his contract with Puntarenas in December 2013 and in January 2014 he joined Carmelita. In December 2014, Delgado moved on to Cartaginés.

== International career ==
He made his debut for Costa Rica in a May 2009 friendly match against Venezuela and has, as of May 2014, earned a total of 12 caps, scoring no goals. He represented his country in 2 FIFA World Cup qualification matches was called up for the 2009 CONCACAF Gold Cup playing 3 games. He also played at the 2011 Copa Centroamericana.

His most recent international was a February 2011 friendly against Venezuela.
