= Carlos Borja (soccer, born 1988) =

American soccer player

Personal information
- Full name: Carlos Roberto Borja Baltazar
- Date of birth: January 18, 1988 (age 38)
- Place of birth: Orange, California, United States
- Height: 6 ft 0 in (1.83 m)
- Position: Defender

Youth career
- 2002–2003: Cruz Azul
- 2003–2006: Irvine Strikers
- 2004–2005: IMG Soccer Academy

Senior career*
Years	Team	Apps	(Gls)
2006–2007	Chivas USA	0	(0)
2008–2009	Tapatio		
2010	Chivas USA	8	(1)
2011–2012	Los Angeles Blues	36	(0)
2013–2014	Chivas USA	26	(0)

International career^{‡}
2004–2005	United States U17	25	(0)
2004–2006	United States U20	6	(0)
- * Club domestic league appearances and goals as of March 28, 2014 ‡ National team caps and goals as of July 17, 2012

Carlos Roberto Borja Baltazar (born January 18, 1988, in Orange, California) is an American former soccer player.

== Career ==
=== Youth ===
Borja, who is of Mexican American descent, came up through the youth system of Cruz Azul, earning an invite after impressing at a tournament. He also spent time with the Irvine Strikers and at the Bradenton Academy.

=== Professional ===
In late July 2006 he was signed to a developmental contract by Chivas USA. He played for Mexican parent club Chivas Guadalajara's affiliate team CD Tapatio in the Primera División A, before returning to Chivas USA in 2010. He made his professional debut for Chivas on April 24, 2010, in a game against the San Jose Earthquakes. In 2011, he joined Los Angeles Blues and remained at the club for two years before returning to Chivas USA for the 2013 season.
