= 2005 Chivas USA season =

Chivas USA
2005 season
- Owner: Jorge Vergara
- Manager: Thomas Rongen (until May 2005); Javier Ledesma Interim (May–June 2005); Hans Westerhof (from June 2005)
- MLS: Conference: 6th Overall: 12th
- MLS Cup Playoffs: Did not qualify
- U.S. Open Cup: Fourth round
- SuperClasico: Runners-up
- Top goalscorer: League: Héctor Cuadros (4); All: Three players (4)
Home colors	Away colors

The 2005 Chivas USA season was the club's first season of existence, and their first in Major League Soccer, the top flight of American soccer. The club competed in the MLS's Western Conference, where they finished in sixth place, or last place, in the Conference.

== Season review ==
Thomas Rongen was appointed as Chivas USA's head coach in September 2004, and coached the team until May 2005, when he was replaced with Javier Ledesma on an interim basis. At the end of June, Hans Westerhof was appointed as the permanent manager until the end of the season.

== Transfers ==
=== In ===
Date	Number	Position	Player	Previous club	Fee/notes	Ref
November 19, 2004	22	DF	(United States) Arturo Torres	LA Galaxy	Expansion Draft First pick	
November 19, 2004	2	DF	(United States) Orlando Perez	Chicago Fire	Expansion Draft Third pick	
November 19, 2004	5	DF	(Saint Vincent and the Grenadines) Ezra Hendrickson	D.C. United	Expansion Draft Fifth pick	
November 19, 2004	8	MF	(United States) Francisco Gomez	LA Galaxy	Expansion Draft Seventh pick	
November 19, 2004		MF	(Mexico) Antonio de la Torre	Colorado Rapids	Expansion Draft Ninth pick	
November 19, 2004	19	FW	(United States) Matt Taylor	Kansas City Wizards	Expansion Draft Eleventh pick	
November 19, 2004		DF	(Jamaica) Craig Ziadie	MetroStars	Expansion Draft Thirteenth pick	
November 19, 2004		FW	(United States) Jamil Walker	San Jose Earthquakes	Expansion Draft Fifteenth pick	
November 19, 2004	99	FW	(Brazil) Thiago Martins	D.C. United	Expansion Draft Seventeenth pick	
November 19, 2004		DF	(United States) Jeff Stewart	Colorado Rapids	Expansion Draft Nineteenth pick	
January 14, 2005	18	GK	(United States) Brad Guzan	Generation Adidas	SuperDraft Round one	
January 14, 2005	17	MF	(United States) Christian Jimenez	South Florida Bulls	SuperDraft Round two	
January 14, 2005	4	DF	(United States) Aaron Lopez	UCLA Bruins	SuperDraft Round three	
January 14, 2005	20	DF	(United States) Esteban Arias	Connecticut Huskies	SuperDraft Round four	
February 26, 2005	27	DF	(Costa Rica) Douglas Sequeira	Real Salt Lake	Trade	
July 2005	4	MF	(United States) Juan Pablo García	(Mexico) Atlas		
August 19, 2005	19	FW	(Mexico) Francisco Palencia	(Mexico) Guadalajara		
	1	GK	(Mexico) Martín Zúñiga	(Mexico) Veracruz		
	21	GK	(United States) Shaun Kalnasy	Spokane Shadow		
	59	GK	(Mexico) Sergio García	Loan from (Mexico) Guadalajara		
	3	DF	(United States) Ryan Suarez	LA Galaxy		
	23	DF	(Mexico) Armando Begines	(Mexico) Guadalajara		
	6	MF	(Mexico) Francisco Mendoza	(Mexico) Guadalajara		
	7	MF	(Mexico) Ramón Ramírez	(Mexico) Guadalajara		
	10	MF	(Mexico) Héctor Cuadros	(Mexico) Guadalajara		
	11	MF	(United States) Milton Blanco	Fresno Fuego		
	12	MF	(United States) Mike Muñoz			
	13	MF	(United States) Rodrigo López	(Mexico) Guadalajara		
	16	MF	(Mexico) Antonio Martínez	(Mexico) Necaxa		
	26	MF	(United States) Jesús Ochoa	(Mexico) Lagartos de Tabasco		
	9	FW	(Mexico) Isaac Romo	Loan from (Mexico) Guadalajara		

=== Out ===
Date	Number	Position	Player	New club	Fee/notes	Ref
November 24, 2004		DF	(United States) Jeff Stewart	Real Salt Lake	Trade	
March 8, 2005		FW	(United States) Jamil Walker	D.C. United	Trade	
June 27, 2005	3	DF	(United States) Ryan Suarez	MetroStars	Waived	
August 29, 2005	1	GK	(Mexico) Martín Zúñiga	Retired		
	4	DF	(United States) Aaron Lopez			
	47	DF	(Mexico) Alfonso Loera	(Mexico) CD Tapatio		
		DF	(Jamaica) Craig Ziadie			
		MF	(Mexico) Antonio de la Torre			

== Roster ==
No.	Name	Nationality	Position	Date of birth (age)	Signed from	Signed in	Contract ends	Apps.	Goals
Goalkeepers
18	Brad Guzan	(United States)	GK	September 9, 1984 (aged 21)	Generation Adidas	2005			
21	Shaun Kalnasy	(United States)	GK	November 4, 1981 (aged 23)	Spokane Shadow	2005			
59	Sergio García	(Mexico)	GK	September 19, 1982 (aged 23)	loan (Mexico) Guadalajara	2005			
Defenders
2	Orlando Perez	(United States)	DF	July 12, 1977 (aged 28)	Chicago Fire	2005			
5	Ezra Hendrickson	(Saint Vincent and the Grenadines)	DF	January 16, 1972 (aged 33)	D.C. United	2005			
20	Esteban Arias	(United States)	DF	August 26, 1982 (aged 23)	Connecticut Huskies	2005			
22	Arturo Torres	(United States)	DF	December 11, 1980 (aged 24)	LA Galaxy	2005			
23	Armando Begines	(Mexico)	DF	March 26, 1983 (aged 22)	(Mexico) Guadalajara	2005			
27	Douglas Sequeira	(Costa Rica)	DF	August 23, 1977 (aged 28)	(Costa Rica) Saprissa	2005			
Midfielders
6	Francisco Mendoza	(Mexico)	MF	April 29, 1985 (aged 20)	(Mexico) Guadalajara	2005			
7	Ramón Ramírez	(Mexico)	MF	December 5, 1969 (aged 35)	(Mexico) Guadalajara	2005			
8	Francisco Gomez	(United States)	MF	January 25, 1979 (aged 26)	Kansas City Wizards	2005			
10	Héctor Cuadros	(Mexico)	MF	March 20, 1983 (aged 22)	(Mexico) Guadalajara	2005			
11	Milton Blanco	(United States)	MF	April 27, 1984 (aged 21)	Fresno Fuego	2005			
12	Mike Muñoz	(United States)	MF	September 14, 1983 (aged 22)	California Golden Bears	2005			
13	Rodrigo López	(United States)	MF	May 10, 1987 (aged 18)	(Mexico) Guadalajara	2005			
16	Antonio Martínez	(Mexico)	MF	July 9, 1977 (aged 28)	(Mexico) Necaxa	2005			
17	Christian Jimenez	(United States)	MF	November 3, 1986 (aged 18)	South Florida Bulls	2005			
26	Jesús Ochoa	(Mexico)	MF	October 12, 1981 (aged 24)	(Mexico) Lagartos de Tabasco	2005			
44	Juan Pablo García	(Mexico)	MF	November 24, 1981 (aged 23)	(Mexico) Atlas	2005			
Forwards
9	Isaac Romo	(Mexico)	FW	March 23, 1983 (aged 22)	loan from (Mexico) Guadalajara	2005	2006		
15	Francisco Palencia	(Mexico)	FW	April 28, 1973 (aged 32)	(Mexico) Guadalajara	2005			
19	Matt Taylor	(United States)	FW	October 17, 1981 (aged 23)	Kansas City Wizards	2005			
99	Thiago Martins	(Brazil)	FW	September 4, 1976 (aged 29)	D.C. United	2005			

== Competitions ==
=== Major League Soccer ===
==== League table ====
Pos	Team	Pld	W	L	T	GF	GA	GD	Pts	Qualification
1	San Jose Earthquakes	32	18	4	10	53	31	+22	64	MLS Cup Playoffs
2	FC Dallas	32	13	10	9	52	44	+8	48	MLS Cup Playoffs
3	Colorado Rapids	32	13	13	6	40	37	+3	45	MLS Cup Playoffs
4	Los Angeles Galaxy	32	13	13	6	44	45	−1	45	MLS Cup Playoffs
5	Real Salt Lake	32	5	22	5	30	65	−35	20	
6	Chivas USA	32	4	22	6	31	67	−36	18	

Source: MLS

==== Results summary ====
Overall								Home						Away					
Pld	Pts	W	L	T	GF	GA	GD	W	L	T	GF	GA	GD	W	L	T	GF	GA	GD
32	18	4	22	6	31	67	−36	3	11	2	15	30	−15	1	11	4	16	37	−21

Last updated: October 16, 2005
Source: ESPNSoccernet.com
Pld = Matches played; Pts = Points; W = Matches won; T = Matches tied; L = Matches lost; GF = Goals for; GA = Goals against; GD = Goal difference

==== Results ====
April 2, 2005 1	Chivas USA	0–2	D.C. United	Carson
13:00 PST	Cuadros (yellow card) 18'	Report	Eskandarian (yellow card) 29'; Gros 32'; Olsen (yellow card) 44'; Gómez (yellow card) 52' (goal) 67'	Stadium: The Home Depot Center; Attendance: 18,493

April 9, 2005 2	San Jose Earthquakes	3–3	Chivas USA	San Jose
13:00 PST	Ching (yellow card) 17' (goal) 90'; Davis 45'; Mullan (yellow card) 60'; Cochrane (yellow card) 71'; Dayak 75'	Report	Martins 3' (yellow card) 33'; Ramírez (yellow card) 40'; Cuadros 73'; Sequeira 90'	Stadium: Spartan Stadium

April 16, 2005 3	Chivas USA	1–3	FC Dallas	Carson
19:00 PST	Ochoa (yellow card) 5'; Martins 44'; Suarez (yellow card) 78'; Hendrickson (yellow card) 90'	Report	O'Brien 40' (yellow card) 66'; Ruiz 85' (pen.); Johnson 90'	Stadium: The Home Depot Center

April 23, 2005 4	LA Galaxy	3–1	Chivas USA	Carson
19:00 PST	Albright (yellow card) 6'; Jones 14'; Vagenas 24'; Kirovski 32'	Report	Cuadros (yellow card) 19'; Lopez (yellow card) 45' (yellow-red card) 51'; Ramírez 49'; Romo (yellow card) 49'	Stadium: The Home Depot Center

April 30, 2005 5	New England Revolution	1–0	Chivas USA	Foxborough
16:30 PST	Dempsey 88'	Report	Cuadros (yellow card) 61'; Taylor (yellow card) 72'; Martins (yellow card) 73'; Suarez (yellow card) 78'; Romo (yellow card) 83'	Stadium: Gillette Stadium

May 7, 2005 6	Chivas USA	1–0	Real Salt Lake	Carson
19:00 PST	Cuadros 39' (pen.); Loera (yellow card) 49'; Begines (yellow card) 90+4'	Report	Rojas (yellow card) 57'; Whitfield (yellow card) 76'; Kreis (yellow card) 85'	Stadium: The Home Depot Center

May 14, 2005 7	Colorado Rapids	2–1	Chivas USA	Denver
18:00 PST	Borchers (yellow card) 18'; Henderson 30' (pen.); Pedro (yellow card) 56'; Cannon (yellow card) 73'; Freeman (red card) 73'; Cunningham 78'; N'Kong (yellow card) 79'; Lewis (yellow card) 86'	Report	Suarez 67'; Ramírez (yellow card) 75'	Stadium: Invesco Field at Mile High

May 18, 2005 8	Real Salt Lake	2–0	Chivas USA	Salt Lake City
18:30 PST	Akwari (yellow card) 20'; Williams 37'; Trembly 39' (yellow card) 68'	Report	Perez (yellow card) 36'; Gomez (yellow card) 83'; Loera (yellow card) 90+2' (yellow-red card) 90+2'	Stadium: Rice-Eccles Stadium

May 22, 2005 9	Chivas USA	2–5	FC Dallas	Carson
18:30 PST	Cuadros 19' (pen.); Romo 53'	Report	Pitchkolan 1'; Goodson (yellow card) 15'; Gbandi (yellow card) 31'; Ruiz 48'; O'Brien 51'; Johnson 69'; Miña 90+1'	Stadium: The Home Depot Center

May 28, 2005 10	Chivas USA	0–2	LA Galaxy	Carson
19:00 PST		Report	Chinchilla 62'; Nagamura (yellow card) 63'; Vagenas 76'; Gomez (yellow card) 83'	Stadium: The Home Depot Center

June 1, 2005 11	Chivas USA	1–1	Kansas City Wizards	Carson
19:30 PST	Ramírez 38'; Martins (yellow card) 58'	Report	Burciaga 30'; Gutiérrez (yellow card) 56'	Stadium: The Home Depot Center

June 4, 2005 12	Chicago Fire	5–2	Chivas USA	Chicago
13:00 PST	Jaqua 2', 60', 74'; Marsch 53'; Guerrero 57'	Report	Martínez 5'; Hendrickson 42'	Stadium: Soldier Field

June 12, 2005 13	Chivas USA	1–1	San Jose Earthquakes	Carson
17:00 PST	Martínez (yellow card) 32'; Romo (yellow card) 62'; Hendrickson 66'; Begines (yellow card) 70'; Torres (yellow card) 90+3'	Report	Clark (yellow card) 15'; Moreno 45'; Aloisi (yellow card) 63'	Stadium: The Home Depot Center

June 18, 2005 14	Chivas USA	1–3	Colorado Rapids	Carson
19:00 PST	Begines (yellow card) 65'; Martins 83' (pen.)	Report	Cunningham 30', 62', 78'; Beckerman (yellow card) 40'; Lewis (yellow card) 83'	Stadium: The Home Depot Center

June 22, 2005 15	FC Dallas	2–1	Chivas USA	Dallas
17:30 PST	Miña 18'; Pitchkolan (yellow card) 45+1'; Thompson 81'; Núñez (yellow card) 90+1'	Report	Hendrickson (yellow card) 39'; Taylor 48'; Ramírez (yellow card) 64'	Stadium: Cotton Bowl

June 25, 2005 16	Kansas City Wizards	3–0	Chivas USA	Kansas City
14:00 PST	Thomas (yellow card) 17'; Conrad 46'; Zavagnin (yellow card) 69'; Arnaud 70'; Victorine 85'	Report	Arias (yellow card) 9'; Martínez (yellow card) 85'	Stadium: Arrowhead Stadium

July 2, 2005 17	Chivas USA	0–1	Chicago Fire	Carson
19:00 PST	Gomez (yellow card) 19'; Martínez (yellow card) 45'; Cuadros (yellow card) 68'; Perez (red card) 76'	Report	Pause (yellow card) 66'; Segares 78'	Stadium: The Home Depot Center

July 9, 2005 18	Chivas USA	5–1	Real Salt Lake	Carson
19:00 PST	Kamler 4' (o.g.); Cuadros 16' (pen.); Ramírez (yellow card) 38'; Martínez 53'; Taylor 55'; Martins (yellow card) 57'; Romo 83'	Report	Knowles (yellow card) 16'; Mathis 23'; Kamler (yellow card) 74'	Stadium: The Home Depot Center

July 16, 2005 19	LA Galaxy	2–0	Chivas USA	Carson
19:00 PST	Kirovski (yellow card) 19'; Gomez 64', 90+3'	Report	Martins (yellow card) 44'; Arias (yellow card) 48'	Stadium: The Home Depot Center

July 22, 2005 20	Chivas USA	1–0	New England Revolution	Carson
19:30 PST	Sequeira 38'	Report	Heaps (yellow card) 81'; Franchino (yellow card) 87'; Dorman (yellow card) 90+1'	Stadium: The Home Depot Center

August 6, 2005 21	Real Salt Lake	2–1	Chivas USA	Salt Lake City
14:00 PST	Mathis (red card) 18'; Williams 49'; Kreis 74' (pen.)	Report	Romo (yellow card) 17'; Ochoa (yellow card) 19'; Arias (red card) 21'; Torres 27'; Sequeira (yellow card) 63'; Begines (yellow card) 74'; Martínez (yellow card) 90+1'	Stadium: Rice-Eccles Stadium

August 10, 2005 22	Chivas USA	0–1	LA Galaxy	Carson
19:00 PST	Sequeira (yellow card) 43'; Torres (yellow card) 68'; Guzan (yellow card) 82'	Report	Albright (yellow card) 32'; Gomez (yellow card) 64'; Donovan 83' (pen.)	Stadium: The Home Depot Center

August 13, 2005 23	D.C. United	3–0	Chivas USA	Washington, D.C.
13:00 PST	Simms (yellow card) 30'; Quaranta 41'; Walker 43'; Kovalenko 64'	Report	Ramírez (yellow card) 35'	Stadium: RFK Stadium

August 21, 2005 24	MetroStars	3–3	Chivas USA	East Rutherford
15:00 PST	Guevara 5' (pen.), 69' (pen.), 90+4'; Bradley (yellow card) 25'; Parke (yellow card) 51'; Meola (yellow card) 86'	Report	Palencia 17', 22' (yellow card) 90+1'; García 39' (yellow card) 45+1'; Mendoza (yellow card) 69'; Hendrickson (yellow card) 80'; Cuadros (yellow card) 86'	Stadium: Giants Stadium

August 27, 2005 25	FC Dallas	2–2	Chivas USA	Frisco
17:30 PST	Goodson (yellow card) 39'; Ruiz 44'; Núñez 67'; Gbandi (yellow card) 69'; Johnson (yellow card) 82'	Report	Arias 37'; Hendrickson 59'; Sequeira (yellow card) 82'	Stadium: Pizza Hut Park

September 3, 2005 26	Chivas USA	0–3	Columbus Crew	Carson
19:00 PST	Palencia (yellow card) 45'	Report	Glen 34'; Wolyniec 60', 69'; Szetela (yellow card) 76'	Stadium: The Home Depot Center

September 10, 2005 27	San Jose Earthquakes	3–0	Chivas USA	San Jose
19:00 PST	Clark (yellow card) 4' (goal) 74'; Chung 47'; Ching 87'	Report	Perez (yellow card) 11'; Hendrickson (yellow card) 33'; Martínez (yellow card) 38'; Palencia (yellow card) 59'; Mendoza (yellow card) 72'	Stadium: Spartan Stadium

September 17, 2005 28	Chivas USA	1–2	San Jose Earthquakes	Carson
19:00 PST	Mendoza (yellow card) 20'; Sequeira (yellow card) 34'; Ramírez 52'	Report	Robinson (yellow card) 67'; Califf 81'; Moreno 90+3'	Stadium: The Home Depot Center

September 24, 2005 29	Chivas USA	1–3	Colorado Rapids	Carson
19:00 PST	Torres 19' (yellow card) 65'; García (yellow card) 36'; Ramírez (yellow card) 49'; Sequeira (yellow card) 59'; Arias (yellow card) 90'	Report	Pedro 25'; Gargan (yellow card) 42'; Kirovski 47' (pen.); Foss (yellow card) 89'; N'Kong (yellow card) 90'; Serna (yellow card) 90+1'; Dayan 90+3'	Stadium: The Home Depot Center

October 1, 2005 30	Columbus Crew	0–1	Chivas USA	Columbus
16:30 PST	Wingert (yellow card) 86'	Report	Palencia 59' (yellow card) 88'	Stadium: Crew Stadium

October 5, 2005 31	Colorado Rapids	1–1	Chivas USA	Denver
18:30 PST	Petke (yellow card) 32'; Dayan 33'; Denton (yellow card) 62'	Report	Borchers 35' (o.g.); Arias (yellow card) 70'	Stadium: Invesco Field at Mile High

October 16, 2005 32	Chivas USA	0–2	MetroStars	Carson
10:00 PST		Report	Bradley 49'; Agoos (yellow card) 65'; Guevara 90+4'	Stadium: The Home Depot Center

=== U.S. Open Cup ===
July 13, 2005 Third round	Charlotte Eagles	2–3 (a.e.t.)	Chivas USA	Davidson
21:00 PST	Coggins 24'; Swinehart 81'		Arias 3'; Martins 84'; Romo 120'	Stadium: Richardson Stadium; Referee: Andrew Chapin

August 3, 2005 Fourth round	LA Galaxy	5–2	Chivas USA	Carson
14:00 PST	Jones 16'; Ngwenya 36'; Gomez 45'; Donovan 89'; Nagamura 93+'		Sequeira 4'; Ramírez 20'	Stadium: The Home Depot Center; Referee: Michael Kennedy

== Statistics ==
As of Match played October 16, 2005

=== Appearances and goals ===
No.	Pos	Nat	Player	Total		MLS		U.S. Open Cup	
No.	Pos	Nat	Player	Apps	Goals	Apps	Goals	Apps	Goals
2	DF	(United States) USA	Orlando Perez	27	0	24+3	0	0	0
5	DF	(Saint Vincent and the Grenadines) VIN	Ezra Hendrickson	31	3	31	3	0	0
6	MF	(Mexico) MEX	Francisco Mendoza	24	0	20+4	0	0	0
7	MF	(Mexico) MEX	Ramón Ramírez	31	3	31	3	0	0
8	MF	(United States) USA	Francisco Gomez	12	0	8+4	0	0	0
9	FW	(Mexico) MEX	Isaac Romo	25	2	11+14	2	0	0
10	MF	(Mexico) MEX	Héctor Cuadros	26	4	18+8	4	0	0
11	MF	(United States) USA	Milton Blanco	5	0	0+5	0	0	0
12	MF	(United States) USA	Mike Muñoz	1	0	0+1	0	0	0
13	MF	(United States) USA	Rodrigo López	1	0	0+1	0	0	0
15	FW	(Mexico) MEX	Francisco Palencia	9	3	9	3	0	0
16	MF	(United States) USA	Antonio Martínez	25	2	16+9	2	0	0
18	GK	(United States) USA	Brad Guzan	24	0	23+1	0	0	0
19	FW	(United States) USA	Matt Taylor	21	2	14+7	2	0	0
20	DF	(United States) USA	Esteban Arias	15	1	14+1	1	0	0
22	DF	(United States) USA	Arturo Torres	23	2	15+8	2	0	0
23	DF	(Mexico) MEX	Armando Begines	22	0	18+4	0	0	0
26	MF	(Mexico) MEX	Jesús Ochoa	16	0	12+4	0	0	0
27	DF	(Costa Rica) CRC	Douglas Sequeira	23	2	23	2	0	0
44	MF	(Mexico) MEX	Juan Pablo García	9	1	9	1	0	0
59	GK	(Mexico) MEX	Sergio García	5	0	5	0	0	0
99	FW	(Brazil) BRA	Thiago Martins	22	3	21+1	3	0	0
Players away from Chivas USA on loan:
Players who left Chivas USA during the season:
1	GK	(Mexico) MEX	Martín Zúñiga	4	0	4	0	0	0
3	DF	(United States) USA	Ryan Suarez	15	1	14+1	1	0	0
4	DF	(United States) USA	Aaron Lopez	4	0	3+1	0	0	0
47	DF	(Mexico) MEX	Alfonso Loera	12	0	9+3	0	0	0

=== Goal scorers ===
Place	Position	Nation	Number	Name	MLS	U.S. Open Cup	Total
1	MF	(Mexico)	10	Héctor Cuadros	4	0	4
1	FW	(Brazil)	99	Thiago Martins	3	1	4
1	MF	(Mexico)	7	Ramón Ramírez	3	1	4
4	DF	(Saint Vincent and the Grenadines)	5	Ezra Hendrickson	3	0	3
4	FW	(Mexico)	15	Francisco Palencia	3	0	3
4	DF	(Costa Rica)	27	Douglas Sequeira	2	1	3
4	FW	(Mexico)	9	Isaac Romo	2	1	3
8	MF	(Mexico)	16	Antonio Martínez	2	0	2
8	FW	(United States)	19	Matt Taylor	2	0	2
8	DF	(United States)	22	Arturo Torres	2	0	2
8				Own goal	2	0	2
8	DF	(United States)	20	Esteban Arias	1	1	2
13	DF	(United States)	3	Ryan Suarez	1	0	1
13	MF	(Mexico)	44	Juan Pablo García	1	0	1
				TOTALS	31	5	36

=== Disciplinary record ===
Number	Nation	Position	Name	MLS		U.S. Open Cup		Total	
Number	Nation	Position	Name	Booked	Sent off (straight red)	Booked	Sent off (straight red)	Booked	Sent off (straight red)
2	(United States)	DF	Orlando Perez	2	1	0	0	2	1
3	(United States)	DF	Ryan Suarez	2	0	0	0	2	0
4	(United States)	DF	Aaron Lopez	2	1	0	0	2	1
5	(Saint Vincent and the Grenadines)	DF	Ezra Hendrickson	4	0	0	0	4	0
6	(Mexico)	MF	Francisco Mendoza	3	0	0	0	3	0
7	(Mexico)	MF	Ramón Ramírez	6	0	0	0	6	0
8	(United States)	MF	Francisco Gomez	2	0	0	0	2	0
9	(Mexico)	FW	Isaac Romo	4	0	0	0	4	0
10	(Mexico)	MF	Héctor Cuadros	5	0	0	0	5	0
15	(Mexico)	FW	Francisco Palencia	4	0	0	0	4	0
16	(Mexico)	MF	Antonio Martínez	5	0	0	0	5	0
18	(United States)	GK	Brad Guzan	1	0	0	0	1	0
19	(United States)	FW	Matt Taylor	1	0	0	0	1	0
20	(United States)	DF	Esteban Arias	4	1	0	0	4	1
22	(United States)	DF	Arturo Torres	3	0	0	0	3	0
23	(Mexico)	DF	Armando Begines	4	0	0	0	4	0
26	(Mexico)	MF	Jesús Ochoa	2	0	0	0	2	0
27	(Costa Rica)	DF	Douglas Sequeira	5	0	0	0	5	0
44	(Mexico)	MF	Juan Pablo García	2	0	0	0	2	0
47	(Mexico)	DF	Alfonso Loera	3	1	0	0	3	1
99	(Brazil)	FW	Thiago Martins	5	0	0	0	5	0
			TOTALS	69	4	0	0	69	4
