= SuperClasico =

American soccer rivalry

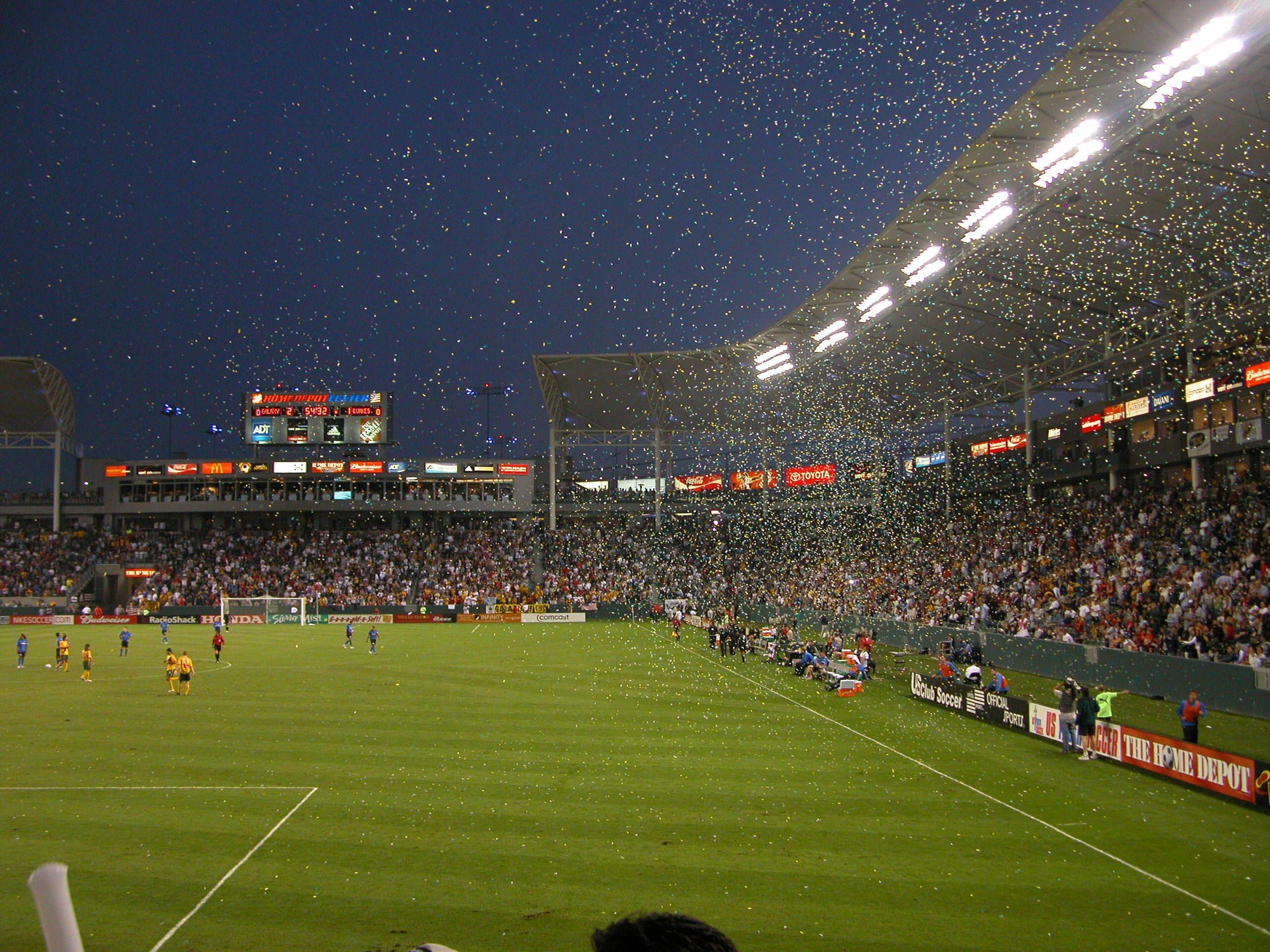
- Inside the Home Depot Center, shared by LA Galaxy and Chivas USA until Chivas' contraction in 2014.
- Other names: L.A. Derby, El Clásico Angelino
- Location: Carson, California, United States; Los Angeles, California, United States
- Teams: Los Angeles Galaxy; Chivas USA
- First meeting: April 23, 2005

Statistics
- Total meetings: 34
- All-time series: Galaxy: 22; Drawn: 8 Chivas: 4
- Largest victory: Galaxy 5–0 Chivas (October 6, 2013)

The SuperClasico, formerly known as the Honda SuperClasico for sponsorship reasons, and also known as the L.A. Derby or El Clásico Angelino, was a sports rivalry between LA Galaxy and Chivas USA. The rivalry ended in 2014 when Chivas ceased operations. The word "SuperClasico" is an allusion to the Mexican Súper Clásico between Club América and the former Chivas USA's parent club Chivas Guadalajara.

== Match history ==
=== 2005 ===
April 23, 2005	Galaxy	3–1	Chivas	Carson, California, US
19:00 PST	Albright (yellow card) 6'; Jones 14'; Vagenas 24'; Kirovski 32'		Cuadros (yellow card) 19'; Lopez (yellow card) 45' (yellow-red card) 51'; Ramírez 49'; Romo (yellow card) 49'	Stadium: The Home Depot Center; Attendance: 27,000

May 28, 2005	Chivas	0–2	Galaxy	Carson, California, US
19:00 PST			Chinchilla 62'; Nagamura (yellow card) 63'; Vagenas 76'; Gomez (yellow card) 83'	Stadium: The Home Depot Center; Attendance: 20,916

July 16, 2005	Galaxy	2–0	Chivas	Carson, California, US
19:00 PST	Kirovski (yellow card) 19'; Gomez 64', 90+3'		Martins (yellow card) 44'; Arias (yellow card) 48'	Stadium: The Home Depot Center; Attendance: 27,000

August 3, 2005	Galaxy	5–2	Chivas	Carson, California, US
14:00 PST	Jones 16'; Ngwenya 36'; Gomez 45'; Donovan 89'; Nagamura 93+'		Sequeira 4'; Ramírez 20'	Stadium: The Home Depot Center; Attendance: 5,268; Referee: Michael Kennedy

August 10, 2005	Chivas	0–1	Galaxy	Los Angeles, California, US
19:00 PST	Sequeira (yellow card) 43'; Torres (yellow card) 68'; Guzan (yellow card) 82'		Albright (yellow card) 32'; Gomez (yellow card) 64'; Donovan 83' (pen.)	Stadium: Los Angeles Memorial Coliseum; Attendance: 88,816

=== 2006 ===
April 16, 2006	Chivas	1–2	Galaxy	Carson, California, US
17:00 PST	Mendoza (yellow card) 39'; Razov 46'; Regan (yellow card) 58'; García (yellow card) 60'; Marsch (yellow card) 90+6'		Albright (yellow card) 37'; Glen 84', 90+3' (yellow card) 90+9'	Stadium: The Home Depot Center

June 8, 2006	Galaxy	1–2	Chivas	Carson, California, US
16:00 PST	Gomez 27'; Ihemelu (yellow card) 70'		Razov 15', 21'; Bornstein (yellow card) 41'; Regan (yellow card) 44'; Vaughn (yellow card) 52'	Stadium: The Home Depot Center

July 15, 2006	Chivas	0–0	Galaxy	Carson, California, US
14:00 PST	Razov (yellow card) 25'; Marsch (yellow card) 29'		Marshall (yellow card) 43'; Albright (yellow card) 53'; Roberts (yellow card) 84'	Stadium: The Home Depot Center

September 30, 2006	Galaxy	3–0	Chivas	Carson, California, US
16:30 PST	Vagenas 29'; Quaranta (yellow card) 39'; Donovan 67'; Gordon 80'		Morales (yellow card) 25'; Marsch (yellow card) 40'	Stadium: The Home Depot Center

=== 2007 ===
April 28, 2007	Galaxy	3–1	Chivas	Carson, California, US
16:30 PST	Donovan 8'; Harmse 17' (yellow card) 58'; Martino (yellow card) 55'; Jones 78'		Zotincă (yellow card) 13'; Marsch (yellow card) 41'; Suárez 63'; Mendoza (yellow card) 78'	Stadium: The Home Depot Center

May 20, 2007	Chivas	1–1	Galaxy	Carson, California, US
13:00 PST	Galindo 35'		Donovan 50'; Harden (yellow card) 57'	Stadium: The Home Depot Center

August 23, 2007	Galaxy	0–3	Chivas	Carson, California, US
16:00 PST	Xavier (yellow card) 40'; Harmse (red card) 45+3'; Martino (yellow card) 61'		Perez (yellow card) 26'; Vaughn (yellow card) 41'; Marsch (yellow card) 45+2'; Galindo 58', 69'; Mendoza 88'	Stadium: The Home Depot Center

September 14, 2007	Chivas	3–0	Galaxy	Carson, California, US
17:00 PST	Marsch (yellow card) 2'; Razov 23'; Nagamura (yellow card) 83'; Mendoza 88'; Merlin 90+1'		Donovan (yellow card) 53'; Xavier (yellow card) 69'; Vagenas (yellow card) 71'	Stadium: The Home Depot Center

=== 2008 ===
April 26, 2008	Chivas	2–5	Galaxy	Carson, California, US
	Kljestan 38'; Razov 63'	Report	Donovan 18', 59', 78'; Gordon 76', 84'	Stadium: Home Depot Center; Attendance: 27,000; Referee: Jair Marrufo

July 10, 2008	Chivas	1–1	Galaxy	Carson, California, US
	Razov 15'	Report	Buddle 72'	Stadium: Home Depot Center; Attendance: 27,000; Referee: Kevin Stott

August 14, 2008	Galaxy	2–2	Chivas	Carson, California, US
	Donovan 8'; Gordon 90+2'	Report	Harris 50'; Nagamura 63'	Stadium: Home Depot Center; Attendance: 27,000; Referee: Alex Prus

=== 2009 ===
April 11, 2009	Galaxy	0–0	Chivas	Carson, California, US
	Miglioranzi (yellow card) 19'; Lewis (yellow card) 26'; Gordon (yellow card) 68' (yellow-red card) 71'; Berhalter (red card) 79'	Report	Nagamura (yellow card) 25' (yellow-red card) 45'; Kljestan (yellow card) 33'; Thomas (yellow card) 36'	Stadium: Home Depot Center; Attendance: 23,317; Referee: Tim Weyland

July 11, 2009	Chivas	0–1	Galaxy	Carson, California, US
		Report	Buddle 30'; Eskandarian (yellow card) 66'	Stadium: Home Depot Center; Attendance: 23,409; Referee: Ricardo Salazar

August 29, 2009	Galaxy	1–0	Chivas	Carson, California, US
	Beckham 80'; Klein (yellow card) 90'	Report	Saragosa (yellow card) 23'; Galindo (red card) 82'; Nagamura (yellow card) 92'	Stadium: Home Depot Center; Attendance: 27,000; Referee: Baldomero Toledo

=== 2010 ===
April 1, 2010	Galaxy	2–0	Chivas	Carson, California, US
8:00 PM PDT	Buddle 7', 86'; Birchall (yellow card) 25'; Stephens (yellow card) 90'	Report	Umaña (yellow card) 18'	Stadium: Home Depot Center; Attendance: 19,805; Referee: Ricardo Salazar

October 3, 2010	Chivas	1–2	Galaxy	Carson, California, US
4:00 PM PDT	Borja (yellow card) 38'; Gordon 63'; Espinoza (yellow card) 79'	Report	Buddle 23'; Beckham 39'; Eddie Lewis (red card) 76'; Stephens (yellow card) 89'	Stadium: Home Depot Center; Attendance: 27,000; Referee: Jair Marrufo

=== 2011 ===
May 21, 2011	Chivas	0–1	Galaxy	Carson, California, US
7:00 PM PDT	Elliott (yellow card) 51'; Valentin (yellow card) 73'	Report	Barrett 25'	Stadium: Home Depot Center; Attendance: 27,000; Referee: Jair Marrufo

October 16, 2011	Galaxy	1–0	Chivas	Carson, California, US
6:00 PM PDT	Barrett 53'; Berhalter (yellow card) 58'	Report	Angel (yellow card) 61'; Boyens (yellow card) 75'	Stadium: Home Depot Center; Attendance: 27,000; Referee: Jair Marrufo

=== 2012 ===
May 19, 2012	Chivas	1–0	Galaxy	Carson, California, US
19:30 PDT	Minda (yellow card) 36'; Correa 72' (pen.)	Report	Júnior Lopes (red card) 70'; Donovan (yellow card) 86'	Stadium: Home Depot Center; Attendance: 18,800; Referee: Mark Geiger

July 21, 2012	Galaxy	3–1	Chivas	Carson, California, US
19:00 PDT	Keane 14'; Beckham (yellow card) 32'; Donovan 48', 78', (yellow card) 53'	Report	Smith (yellow card) 18'; Zemanski (yellow card) 36'; McKenzie (yellow card) 47'; Cardozo 52'	Stadium: Home Depot Center; Attendance: 25,180; Referee: Jorge Gonzalez

August 12, 2012	Chivas	0–4	Galaxy	Carson, California, US
20:00 PDT	Valencia (yellow card) 33'	Report	Keane 27'; Juninho 64', 74'; Gonzalez 83'	Stadium: Home Depot Center; Attendance: 17,601; Referee: Jair Marrufo

=== 2013 ===
March 17, 2013	Galaxy	1–1	Chivas	Carson, California, US
20:00 PDT	Franklin (yellow card) 28'; Marcelo Sarvas (yellow card) 33'; McBean 83'; Keane (yellow card) 90+4'		Iraheta (yellow card) 23'; Velázquez (red card) 40'; Alvarez 89'	Stadium: The Home Depot Center; Attendance: 19,117; Referee: Ricardo Salazar

June 23, 2013	Chivas	0–1	Galaxy	Carson, California, US
20:00 UTC–8	Vílchez (yellow card) 82'		Zardes 44'; Dunivant (yellow card) 90+1'	Stadium: The Home Depot Center; Attendance: 14,575; Referee: Hilario Grajeda

October 6, 2013	Galaxy	5–0	Chivas	Carson, California, US
14:00 UTC–8	Keane 6', 90'; Donovan 23', 41'; Zardes 26'			Stadium: The Home Depot Center; Attendance: 21,160; Referee: Jair Marrufo

=== 2014 ===
April 6, 2014	Chivas	0–3	Galaxy	Carson, California, US
	Torres (yellow card) 40'; Rosales (yellow card) 48'	Report	Gargan (yellow card) 26'; Keane 37'; Ishizaki 42'; Husidic 56'	Stadium: StubHub Center; Attendance: 15,008; Referee: Drew Fischer

June 8, 2014	Galaxy	1–1	Chivas	Carson, California, US
	Zardes 35'	Report	Torres 20'	Stadium: StubHub Center; Attendance: 19,756; Referee: Jair Marrufo

August 31, 2014	Chivas	0–3	Galaxy	Carson, California, US
	Jean-Baptiste (yellow card) 22'; Torres (red card) 75'	Report	Zardes 41' 71'; Keane 68'	Stadium: StubHub Center; Attendance: 18,652; Referee: Ismail Elfath

=== Summaries ===
Date	Galaxy	Chivas
August 31, 2014	3	0
June 8, 2014	1	1
April 6, 2014	3	0
October 6, 2013	5	0
June 23, 2013	1	0
March 17, 2013	1	1
August 12, 2012	4	0
July 21, 2012	3	1
May 19, 2012	0	1
October 16, 2011	1	0
May 21, 2011	1	0
October 3, 2010	2	1
April 1, 2010	2	0
November 8, 2009***	1	0
November 1, 2009***	2	2
August 29, 2009	1	0
July 11, 2009	1	0
April 11, 2009	0	0
August 14, 2008	2	2
July 10, 2008	1	1
April 27, 2008	5	2
September 13, 2007	0	3
August 23, 2007	0	3
May 20, 2007	1	1
April 28, 2007	3	1
September 30, 2006	3	0
July 15, 2006	0	0
June 8, 2006	2	1
April 15, 2006	2	1
August 10, 2005**	1	0
August 3, 2005*	5	2
July 16, 2005	2	0
May 28, 2005	2	0
April 23, 2005	3	1

* – Lamar Hunt U.S. Open Cup match

** – Played at Los Angeles Memorial Coliseum *** – MLS Cup Playoffs

Year	Derby winner	Galaxy	Draw	Chivas
2005	Galaxy	5	0	0
2006	Galaxy	2	1	1
2007	Chivas	1	1	2
2008	Galaxy	1	2	0
2009	Galaxy	3	2	0
2010	Galaxy	2	0	0
2011	Galaxy	2	0	0
2012	Galaxy	2	0	1
2013	Galaxy	2	1	0
2014	Galaxy	2	1	0
Total		22	8	4

== Other rivalries in the Los Angeles area ==
- Major League Baseball: Freeway Series
- National Hockey League: Freeway Face-Off
- National Basketball Association: Lakers–Clippers rivalry
- College sports: UCLA–USC rivalry

=== Former ===
- National Football League: Rams-Raiders rivalry

== See also ==
- El Tráfico – Current rivalry between LA Galaxy and Los Angeles FC
