= 2003 U.S. Open Cup =

2003 Lamar Hunt U.S. Open Cup
Tournament details
- Country: United States

Final positions
- Champions: Chicago Fire (3rd title)
- Runners-up: MetroStars

Tournament statistics
- Top goal scorer(s): Amado Guevara (4 goals)

The 2003 Lamar Hunt U.S. Open Cup ran from June through October, 2003, open to all soccer teams in the United States.

The Chicago Fire won their 3rd Open Cup title with a 1–0 victory over the MetroStars in the final at Giants Stadium, East Rutherford, New Jersey. Chicago missed out on a domestic treble (with the Supporters' Shield) when the Fire lost MLS Cup 2003.

The Open Cup tournament was dominated by MLS squads, as only two non-MLS teams reached the quarterfinals. The Pro Select League's Wilmington Hammerheads were the story of the tournament, winning four straight games to reach the quarterfinals, including a 4-1 thrashing of MLS side Dallas Burn. The A-League's Seattle Sounders were the only other lower division team to beat an MLS team, winning 1–0 over San Jose.

== Open Cup bracket ==
Home teams listed on top of bracket

Third Round
PDL	Mid Michigan Bucks	0
MLS	MetroStars	4
A-L	Rochester Rhinos	4
PSL	New Hampshire Phantoms	1
PSL	Wilmington Hammerheads	2
A-L	Atlanta Silverbacks	1
MLS	D.C. United	2
A-L	Pittsburgh Riverhounds	1
A-L	Virginia Beach Mariners	5
PDL	Carolina Dynamo	0
A-L	Milwaukee Wave United	4
USASA	Bavarian SC	1
A-L	Minnesota Thunder	0
A-L	Seattle Sounders	1
A-L	El Paso Patriots	2
PDL	Fresno Fuego	5

Fourth Round
MLS	Columbus Crew	3
MLS	MetroStars	4
MLS	New England Revolution	2
A-L	Rochester Rhinos	1
PSL	Wilmington Hammerheads	4
MLS	Dallas Burn	1
MLS	D.C. United (ASDET)	1
A-L	Virginia Beach Mariners	0
A-L	Milwaukee Wave United	1
MLS	Chicago Fire	4
MLS	Colorado Rapids	3
MLS	Kansas City Wizards	2
A-L	Seattle Sounders	1
MLS	San Jose Earthquakes	0
MLS	Los Angeles Galaxy	3
PDL	Fresno Fuego	1

Quarterfinals
MLS	MetroStars (ASDET)	2
MLS	New England Revolution	1
PSL	Wilmington Hammerheads	0
MLS	D.C. United	1
MLS	Chicago Fire	2
MLS	Colorado Rapids	1
A-L	Seattle Sounders	1
MLS	Los Angeles Galaxy	5

Semifinals
MLS	MetroStars	3
MLS	D.C. United	2
MLS	Chicago Fire	3
MLS	Los Angeles Galaxy	2

Finals
MLS	MetroStars	0
MLS	Chicago Fire	1

== Schedule ==
Note: Scorelines use the standard U.S. convention of placing the home team on the right-hand side of box scores.

=== First round ===
Four PDL and four USASA teams start.

June 4, 2003 protested	Bridgeport Italians (USASA)	1–0 – n/a	Chesapeake Dragons (PDL)	Bowie, Maryland
	Rubén Fernández 25'	(Report)		Stadium: Bowie State University; Attendance: 200; Referee: Joe Rieck (USA)

forfeit for ineligible player	Bridgeport Italians (USASA)	0–2 / f	Chesapeake Dragons (PDL)
		(Report)

June 4, 2003	Chico Rooks (USASA)	0–1	Fresno Fuego (PDL)	Fresno, California
		(Report)	Jose Luis Espindola 80'	Stadium: Steinert Field; Attendance: 200; Referee: Abi Mohebbi (USA)

June 5, 2003	Bavarian Soccer Club (USASA)	2–1 (asdet)	Des Moines Menace (PDL)	Des Moines, Iowa
	Ryan Seymour 66'; Brian Doherty 111'	(Report)	Daryl Brazeau 90'	Stadium: Cara McGrane Memorial Stadium; Attendance: 3,152; Referee: Douglas Jotzke (USA)

June 7, 2003	D.S. United (USASA)	1–4	Raleigh CASL Elite (PDL)	Cary, North Carolina
	Adrian Miron 45'	(Report)	David Buehler 26'; Keith Nicholson 34'; Ray Fumo 55'; John Izzo 87'	Stadium: SAS Stadium; Attendance: 389; Referee: Guy Goodrich (USA)

=== Second round ===
Six PSL and two PDL teams enter.

June 24, 2003	Reading Rage (PSL)	0–1	Bavarian SC (USASA)	Milwaukee
		(Report)	Dan Stebbins 86'	Stadium: Bavarian Soccer Park; Attendance: 450; Referee: Kelly Ross (USA)

June 25, 2003	Long Island Rough Riders (PSL)	1–2	Mid Michigan Bucks (PDL)	Berkley, Michigan
	Darrell Etienne 56'	(Report)	Kevin Taylor 74'; Simon Omekanda 80'	Stadium: Hurley Field; Attendance: 1,105; Referee: Brent Song (USA)

June 25, 2003	Bradenton Academics (PDL)	1–2 (asdet)	Wilmington Hammerheads (PSL)	Wilmington, North Carolina
	Rory Dowdell 82'	(Report)	Chad Goulding 34'; Ryan Miller 94'	Stadium: Legion Stadium; Attendance: -- Referee: Daniel Burack (USA)

June 25, 2003	Utah Blitzz (PSL)	0–4	Fresno Fuego (PDL)	Fresno, California
		(Report)	Jose Luis Espindola 28'; Edgardo Contreras 69', 86; Orlando Ramirez 78'	Stadium: Steinert Field; Attendance: 1,076; Referee: Cory Dean (USA)

June 25, 2003	Raleigh CASL Elite (PDL)	1–2	Carolina Dynamo (PSL)	Greensboro, North Carolina
	Chris Norbert 88'	(Report)	Steve Armas 49'; T. J. Rolfing 53'	Stadium: Macpherson Stadium; Attendance: 703; Referee: John Frey (USA)

June 25, 2003 match annulled after first-rd. protest upheld	Bridgeport Italians (USASA)	0–3 – n/a	New Hampshire Phantoms (PSL)	Manchester, New Hampshire
		(Report)	Ryan Ackerman 19'; Bjørn Hansen 38' (pen); Ebbie Kodiat 83'	Stadium: Singer Park; Attendance: 800; Referee: Erich Simmons (USA)

July 10, 2003 replay	Chesapeake Dragons (PDL)	2–3 (asdet)	New Hampshire Phantoms (PSL)	Manchester, New Hampshire
	Justin Combs 61', 73'	(Report)	Tsuyoshi Tanikawa 38', 63'; Ebbie Kodiat 101'	Stadium: Singer Park; Attendance: 451; Referee: Gus St. Silva (USA)

=== Third round ===
Eight A-League and two MLS teams enter.

July 16, 2003	MetroStars (MLS)	4–0	Mid Michigan Bucks (PDL)	Berkley, Michigan
	Amado Guevara 5'; John Wolyniec 83'; Mike Nugent 87'; José Galván 88'	(Report)		Stadium: Hurley Stadium; Attendance: 4,010; Referee: Richard Rodriguez (USA)

July 16, 2003	New Hampshire Phantoms (PSL)	1–4	Rochester Raging Rhinos (A-League)	Rochester, New York
	Bjørn Hansen 10'	(Report)	Viktor Paco 17'; Stoian Mladenov 67'; Fred Commodore 85'; David Hayes 90'	Stadium: Frontier Field; Attendance: 7,461; Referee: Vladimir Fabre (USA)

July 16, 2003	Atlanta Silverbacks (A-League)	1–2	Wilmington Hammerheads (PSL)	Wilmington, North Carolina
	Mac Cozier 52'	(Report)	Byron Charmichael 66'; Kevin Nylen 75'	Stadium: Legion Stadium; Attendance: 1,568; Referee: Abbas Piran (USA)

July 16, 2003	Pittsburgh Riverhounds (A-League)	1–2	D.C. United (MLS)	Germantown, Maryland
	Thiago Martins 74'	(Report)	Mike Petke 33'; Dema Kovalenko 44'	Stadium: Maryland SoccerPlex; Attendance: 3,073; Referee: Hector Tobon (USA)

July 16, 2003	Carolina Dynamo (PDL)	0–5	Virginia Beach Mariners (A-League)	Virginia Beach, Virginia
		(Report)	Dante Washington 16', 35'; Roland Aguilera; Roland Aguilera 72'; Carlos Garcia	Stadium: Virginia Beach Sportsplex; Attendance: 518; Referee: Dan Stead (USA)

July 16, 2003	Seattle Sounders (A-League)	1–0	Minnesota Thunder (A-League)	Blaine, Minnesota
	Kyle Smith 50'	(Report)		Stadium: National Sports Center; Attendance: 3,182; Referee: Brian Hall (USA)

July 16, 2003	Fresno Fuego (PDL)	5–2	El Paso Patriots (A-League)	El Paso, Texas
	Eric Farfan 11'; Orlando Ramirez 73', 81'; Ernie Vega 83'; Eddie Gutierrez 87'	(Report)	Omar Mora 16'; Laurenco Andrade 34' (pen)	Stadium: Dudley Stadium; Attendance: 1,750; Referee: Troy Travis (USA)

July 23, 2003	Bavarian Soccer Club (USASA)	1–4	Milwaukee Wave United (A-League)	Milwaukee
	Dominic DePra 85'	(Report)	Greg Howes 10', 19'; Dino Delevski 61'; Vitalis Takawira 69'	Stadium: Uihlein Soccer Park; Attendance: 4,161; Referee: Robert Petersen (USA)

=== Fourth round ===
Eight MLS teams enter.

August 5, 2003	San Jose Earthquakes (MLS)	0–1	Seattle Sounders (A-League)	Seattle
		(Report)	Kyle Smith 41'	Stadium: Husky Soccer Field; Attendance: 2,510; Referee: David Simon (USA)

August 6, 2003	MetroStars (MLS)	4–3	Columbus Crew (MLS)	Columbus, Ohio
	Brian Maisonneuve 24'(og); Steve Jolley 54'; Eddie Pope 77', 86'	(Report)	Edson Buddle 10', 11'; Brian Maisonneuve 43'	Stadium: Crew Stadium; Attendance: 5,590; Referee: Kevin Stott (USA)

August 6, 2003	Rochester Raging Rhinos (A-League)	1–2	New England Revolution (MLS)	Ludlow, Massachusetts
	Stoian Mladenov 23'	(Report)	Steve Ralston 25'; Taylor Twellman 45'	Stadium: Lusitano Stadium; Attendance: 2,400; Referee: Gus St. Silva (USA)

August 6, 2003	Dallas Burn (MLS)	1–4	Wilmington Hammerheads (PSL)	Wilmington, North Carolina
	Eddie Johnson 6'	(Report)	Jeff Johnson 33'; Kevin Nylen 52'; Glenn Murray 69', 89'	Stadium: Legion Stadium; Attendance: 3,019; Referee: Roni Canales (USA)

August 6, 2003	D.C. United (MLS)	1–0 (asdet)	Virginia Beach Mariners (A-League)	Germantown, Maryland
	Hristo Stoitchkov 97'	(Report)		Stadium: Maryland SoccerPlex; Attendance: 2,870; Referee: Abbey Okulaja (USA)

August 6, 2003	Chicago Fire (MLS)	4–1	Milwaukee Wave United (A-League)	Milwaukee
	Chris Armas 14'; Ante Razov 34'; Evan Whitfield 61'; Dipsy Selolwane 80'	(Report)	Greg Howes 2'	Stadium: Uihlein Soccer Park; Attendance: 3,773; Referee: Marcel Yohan (USA)

August 6, 2003	Kansas City Wizards (MLS)	2–3	Colorado Rapids (MLS)	Arvada, Colorado
		(Report)		Stadium: North Area Athletic Complex; Attendance: 1,421; Referee: Richard Heron (USA)

August 6, 2003	Fresno Fuego (PDL)	1–3	Los Angeles Galaxy (MLS)	Carson, California
	Eddie Gutierrez 89'	(Report)	Arturo Torres 25'; Alejandro Moreno 33'; Paul Broome 89'	Stadium: Home Depot Center; Attendance: 6,860; Referee: Ramón Hernández (USA)

=== Quarterfinals ===
August 27, 2003	New England Revolution (MLS)	1–2 (asdet)	MetroStars (MLS)	Piscataway, New Jersey
	Jay Heaps 45'	(Report)	Clint Mathis 29'; Amado Guevara 116'	Stadium: Yurcak Field; Attendance: 3,853; Referee: Roni Canales (USA)

August 27, 2003	D.C. United (MLS)	1–0	Wilmington Hammerheads (PSL)	Wilmington, North Carolina
	Ronald Cerritos 30'	(Report)		Stadium: Legion Field; Attendance: 5,026; Referee: Gus St. Silva (USA)

August 27, 2003	Colorado Rapids (MLS)	1–2	Chicago Fire (MLS)	Naperville, Illinois
	John Spencer 36'	(Report)	DaMarcus Beasley 44'; Robin Fraser 53' (og)	Stadium: Cardinal Stadium; Attendance: 5,156; Referee: Michael Kennedy (USA)

August 27, 2003	Los Angeles Galaxy (MLS)	5–1	Seattle Sounders (A-League)	Seattle
	Carlos Ruiz 3', 87', 90'; Antonio Martínez 39'; Alejandro Moreno 67'	(Report)	Jason Farrell 70'	Stadium: Seahawks Stadium; Attendance: 7,542; Referee: Jesse Johnson (USA)

=== Semifinals ===
September 23, 2003	Los Angeles Galaxy (MLS)	2–3	Chicago Fire (MLS)	Naperville, Illinois
	Alejandro Moreno 73'; Arturo Torres 75'	(Report)	DaMarcus Beasley 55'; Damani Ralph 63'; Ante Razov 69'	Stadium: Cardinal Stadium; Attendance: 5,327; Referee: Gus St. Silva (USA)

October 1, 2003	D.C. United (MLS)	2–3	MetroStars (MLS)	Piscataway, New Jersey
	Galin Ivanov 18'; Ronald Cerritos 76'	(Report)	Amado Guevara 20', 43'; John Wolyniec 88'	Stadium: Yurcak Field; Attendance: 3,791; Referee: Terry Vaughn (USA)

=== Final ===
October 15, 2003

Chicago Fire (MLS)	1–0	MetroStars (MLS)
Damani Ralph 68'	(Report)

Giants Stadium
East Rutherford, New Jersey
Attendance: 5,183
Referee: Kevin Stott (USA)

== Top scorers ==
Position	Player	Club	Goals
1	Amado Guevara	MetroStars	4
2	Antonio Martínez	Los Angeles Galaxy	3
	Alejandro Moreno	Los Angeles Galaxy	3
	John Spencer	Colorado Rapids	3
	Greg Howes	Milwaukee Wave United	3
	Orlando Ramirez	Fresno Fuego	3
	Carlos Ruíz	Los Angeles Galaxy	3

== See also ==
- 2003 National Amateur Cup
