= Loera =

Loera is a surname of Spanish origin. Notable people with the surname include:

- Alfonso Loera (born 1978), Mexican footballer
- Olga Loera (born 1985), Mexican-American glamour model
- Don Patrocinio Loera (born 1940, died 2021), Mexican former equestrian athlete
