= Brian Dunseth =

American soccer player and commentator

Personal information
- Full name: Brian William Dunseth
- Date of birth: March 2, 1977 (age 49)
- Place of birth: Upland, California, U.S.
- Height: 6 ft 1 in (1.85 m)
- Position: Defender

College career
Years	Team	Apps	(Gls)
1995–1996	Cal State Fullerton		

Senior career*
Years	Team	Apps	(Gls)
1997–2001	New England Revolution	82	(1)
1998	→ MLS Pro-40 (loan)	1	(0)
2001	Miami Fusion	15	(0)
2002–2003	Columbus Crew	51	(1)
2003	Dallas Burn	9	(1)
2004	Bodens BK	24	(2)
2005	Real Salt Lake	24	(2)
2006	Los Angeles Galaxy	0	(0)

International career
2000	United States	1	(0)
Medal record
Representing United States
Runner-up	CONCACAF Gold Cup	1998
Men's Soccer
- * Club domestic league appearances and goals

Brian William “Dunny” Dunseth (born March 2, 1977) is an American television soccer commentator and former player.

== Career ==
=== College ===
Dunseth played college soccer at California State University, Fullerton, and was one of the first players to sign a Project-40 contract, in 1997.

=== Professional ===
On June 5, 1997, Dunseth was assigned to the New England Revolution. He made his first appearance for the Revolution on July 6, in a loss to the San Jose Clash. He made his home debut on August 3, also in a loss to the San Jose Clash. He scored his first (and only) Revolution goal during the 2000 New England Revolution season, on April 29 in a tie against the Miami Fusion. In total, Dunseth spent four-and-a-half seasons in New England, appearing in 82 matches and making 69 starts. On June 20, 2001, the Revolution traded Dunseth to the Miami Fusion for Jay Heaps and a second-round pick in the 2003 MLS SuperDraft.

The Fusion was contracted next year, and Dunseth was taken by the Columbus Crew in the 2002 MLS Dispersal Draft and spent a year and a half there, before a trade to the Dallas Burn.

Dunseth left Major League Soccer for 2004, playing for Bodens BK in Sweden. He was elected Best Player of the Norrbotten County that season by a major newspaper. He then returned to MLS, signing with Real Salt Lake. He played a year with the club, before a trade to Chivas USA for Douglas Sequeira and Christian Jimenez. Before the 2006 season started, Dunseth was traded again, to the Los Angeles Galaxy for a draft pick. In process, he became the first MLS player to be on the roster of seven different teams (although he never played for Chivas). He was waived by the Galaxy in May 2006. In eight years of MLS, Dunseth scored five goals and six assists. He retired from professional soccer in July 2006.

He played for Los Angeles–based amateur team Hollywood United in the 2008 Lamar Hunt U.S. Open Cup

=== International ===
Dunseth was captain of the U.S. team that competed at the 2000 Summer Olympics and 1997 World Youth Championship.

== Personal life ==
Along with college teammate Ben Hooper and Ace Harrison, Dunseth co-owns a fashion line called Bumpy Pitch and The Original Winger, a soccer-specific lifestyle website.

=== Sportscasting ===
After retiring from his professional soccer career, Dunseth worked as a sportscaster for Real Salt Lake. He frequently contributed to various MLS partners for commentary while still working for RSL. He was named one of the commentators for Apple TV's MLS coverage in 2023.

== Honors ==
=== Club ===
Columbus Crew

- Lamar Hunt U.S. Open Cup: 2002
