= Christian Jimenez =

American soccer player

Personal information
- Date of birth: November 3, 1986 (age 39)
- Place of birth: San Dimas, California, United States
- Height: 5 ft 9 in (1.75 m)
- Position: Midfielder

Youth career
- 2002–2004: Strikers FC
- 2004: South Florida Bulls

Senior career*
Years	Team	Apps	(Gls)
2001	San Gabriel Valley Highlanders		
2005	Chivas USA	0	(0)
2006–2008	Real Salt Lake	1	(0)

International career
2008	United States U23		
- * Club domestic league appearances and goals as of June 26, 2008

Christian Jimenez (born November 3, 1986) is an American former soccer player.

== Career ==
Jimenez trained with the United States under-17 national team at the USSF's Bradenton Academy from the Fall 2002 to Spring 2004, and competed in a Youth World Championship. Upon graduating from Bradenton, Jimenez moved to the University of South Florida along with Rodrigo Hidalgo. At USF he played only one season of college soccer, appearing in 17 games and registering four goals and four assists, before turning professional by signing a Generation Adidas contract with MLS.

Jimenez was selected 14th overall in the 2005 MLS SuperDraft by Chivas USA, a team dedicated to fielding a largely Hispanic, Spanish-speaking team in MLS. He never played a first-team match for Chivas and was traded to Real Salt Lake after the 2005 season along with Douglas Sequeira for Brian Dunseth. He made one appearance in the 2006 season, but missed the rest of the season due to a torn ACL to his left knee. Failing to make an impact in 2007, he was waived by ownership and coach Jason Kreis.
