= Douglas Sequeira (footballer, born 2003) =

Costa Rican footballer

Personal information
- Full name: Douglas Esteban Sequeira Borbón
- Date of birth: 16 September 2003 (age 23)
- Place of birth: San José, Costa Rica
- Height: 1.87 m (6 ft 2 in)
- Position: Defender

Team information
- Current team: Saprissa
- Number: 30

Senior career*
Years	Team	Apps	(Gls)
2020–	Saprissa	40	(0)
2021–2022	→ Uruguay (loan)		
2023	→ Santos de Guápiles (loan)	16	(1)
2024	→ Nacional (loan)	0	(0)

International career^{‡}
2018	Costa Rica U15	1	(0)
2022	Costa Rica U20	6	(0)
2023–	Costa Rica U23	7	(0)
- * Club domestic league appearances and goals as of 23 February 2025 ‡ National team caps and goals as of 22:34, 13 June 2024 (UTC)

Douglas Esteban Sequeira Borbón (born 16 September 2003) is a Costa Rican professional footballer who plays as a defender for Saprissa. He is the son of former Costa Rican international footballer Douglas Sequeira.

== Career statistics ==
=== Club ===
As of 13 June 2024.

Club	Season	League			Cup		Continental		Other		Total	
Club	Season	Division	Apps	Goals	Apps	Goals	Apps	Goals	Apps	Goals	Apps	Goals
Saprissa	2020–21	Liga FPD	2	0	0	0	0	0	0	0	2	0
Saprissa	2022–23	Liga FPD	0	0	1	0	0	0	0	0	1	0
Saprissa	2023–24	Liga FPD	31	0	3	0	1	0	2	0	37	0
Santos de Guápiles	2022–23	Liga FPD	16	1	0	0	0	0	0	0	16	1
Career total			49	1	4	0	1	0	2	0	56	1
