= Ricky Lewis =

American soccer player

- Lewis in 2026

Eric Timothy Lewis (born May 29, 1982, in Houston, Texas) is an American soccer defender.

== Career ==
Lewis played college soccer at Clemson University for three years from 2000 to 2002. A starter for all three years, Lewis finished his career at the school with ten goals and 12 assists in 61 games.

After his junior season, Lewis signed a Project-40 contract with MLS, and was selected 20th overall in the 2003 MLS SuperDraft by the Los Angeles Galaxy. As a rookie with the Galaxy, Lewis played in 13 games for the team, a starter in seven of those. In the 2004 season, he was traded mid-season to the Colorado Rapids in exchange for a late-round draft pick. Lewis started for Colorado in 16 games in 2005. He was waived at the end of 2005. After leaving Colorado, he was invited to train with Standard Liege in Belgium for two weeks in the fall of 2005, but failed to land another regular roster spot. While showing promise coming out of college, Lewis hung up his cleats for good by 2006.

Lewis had five years of youth national team experience. He was the starting left back of the US Under-20 team which competed in the 2001 FIFA World Youth Championship. He was also a member of the US Under-23 team which competed for a berth in the 2004 Olympics. During the final qualifying tournament, he played in 6 games, starting in the final three.

== Personal life ==
Lewis is married to Leslie Osborne, with whom he has three daughters.
