= Armando Begines =

Mexican footballer (born 1983)

Personal information
- Full name: Armando Efrén Begines Ávalos
- Date of birth: 26 March 1983 (age 43)
- Place of birth: Guadalajara, Mexico
- Height: 1.80 m (5 ft 11 in)
- Position: Defender

Team information
- Current team: Laredo Heat
- Number: 23

Youth career
- 1999–2005: Guadalajara

Senior career*
Years	Team	Apps	(Gls)
2005	Chivas USA	10	(0)
2006	Querétaro	1	(0)
2007–2008	Club Celaya		
2008–2009	La Piedad	9	(0)
2010–2011	Guerreros		
2011–	Laredo Heat	11	(3)
- * Club domestic league appearances and goals as of 9 June 2011

Armando Efren Begines Avalos (Note: In this Spanish name, the first or paternal surname is Begines and the second or maternal family name is Avalos.) (born 26 March 1983) is a Mexican professional footballer who currently plays for Laredo Heat in the USL Premier Development League.

Begines played for C.D. Chivas USA in Major League Soccer in 2005. Begines came to Chivas USA from parent club Chivas de Guadalajara, and also played for their other farm club, La Piedad. He has been a part of the Chivas system since 1999. Begines was released by Chivas USA in November 2005.
