= Sergio García (footballer, born 1982) =

Mexican footballer

Personal information
- Full name: Sergio Alejandro García Nario
- Date of birth: 19 September 1982 (age 44)
- Place of birth: Guadalajara, Jalisco, Mexico
- Height: 1.86 m (6 ft 1 in)
- Position: Goalkeeper

Team information
- Current team: La Paz (Goalkeeping coach)

Youth career
- Guadalajara

Senior career*
Years	Team	Apps	(Gls)
2005–2005	Guadalajara	0	(0)
2005	→ Chivas USA (loan)	5	(0)
2008–2009	Veracruz	7	(0)
2009–2010	U. de G.	28	(0)
2010–2011	Altamira	7	(0)
2011–2013	Querétaro	25	(0)
2013–2014	UANL	16	(0)
2015	→ Chiapas (loan)	10	(0)
2015–2016	→ Veracruz (loan)	4	(0)
2016	→ FC Juárez (loan)	1	(0)
2017	U. de G.	9	(0)
2017	Veracruz	0	(0)

Managerial career
- 2020–2022: Mazorqueros (Goalkeeping coach)
- 2022–: La Paz (Goalkeeping coach)
- * Club domestic league appearances and goals

Sergio Alejandro "Matute" García Nario (born September 19, 1982) is a Mexican former footballer who played as a goalkeeper for Veracruz on loan from Tigres UANL in the Liga Bancomer MX.

== Career ==
=== Querétaro ===
García made his professional first division debut on 17 March 2012 against Guadalajara, the club that owned his contract at the time.
