= Antonio de la Torre (footballer, born 1977) =

Mexican-American soccer player (born 1977)

Personal information
- Full name: Antonio de la Torre García
- Date of birth: November 18, 1977 (age 48)
- Place of birth: Guadalajara, Mexico
- Height: 1.78 m (5 ft 10 in)
- Position: Defender

Antonio de la Torre García (born November 18, 1977) is a Mexican-American former soccer defender, who recently played for the Atlanta Silverbacks of the USL First Division. De la Torre holds dual citizenship in Mexico and the United States.

== Biography ==
Before joining MLS, de la Torre played most of his career in Mexico's Primera A, the second division. He played for Atlante F.C. in the Primera Division.

He joined MLS for the 2004 season, signing with the Colorado Rapids, and immediately impressed with his offensive abilities. Unlike most American defenders, de la Torre was a danger going forward from his right back position, and finished the season with five assists in 28 starts. However, near the end of the season, coach Tim Hankinson grew tired of de la Torre's defensive failures, and benched him for the playoffs.

Following the end of the season, de la Torre was exposed for the 2004 MLS Expansion Draft, where he was selected fifth overall by C.D. Chivas USA, but was cut before the season. He signed with Atlanta soon after.

De la Torre's father, Antonio de la Torre Villalpando, played in Mexico during the 70's and 80's, and appeared for Mexico during the 1978 World Cup tournament. His uncle, "Chepo", is the head coach of CD Guadalajara of the Primera División de México, actually he works as a construction worker in Atlanta and RETO
