= Ramón Ramírez (footballer) =

Mexican footballer (born 1969)

Personal information
- Full name: Jesús Ramón Ramírez Ceceña
- Date of birth: 5 December 1969 (age 56)
- Place of birth: Tepic, Nayarit, Mexico
- Height: 1.73 m (5 ft 8 in)
- Position: Midfielder

Senior career*
Years	Team	Apps	(Gls)
1988–1990	Tepic	45	(2)
1990–1994	Santos Laguna	99	(12)
1994–1998	Guadalajara	150	(21)
1999	América	18	(3)
1999–2001	Tigres UANL	64	(1)
2002–2004	Guadalajara	82	(6)
2005–2007	Chivas USA	31	(2)
Total		489	(47)

International career
1991–2000	Mexico	119	(14)
Medal record
Men's football
Representing Mexico
FIFA Confederations Cup
Winner	1999 Mexico
CONCACAF Gold Cup
Winner	1998 United States
Copa América
Runner-up	1993 Ecuador
Third place	1999 Paraguay
- * Club domestic league appearances and goals

Jesús Ramón Ramírez Ceceña (born 5 December 1969) is a Mexican former professional footballer who played as a midfielder.

Ramírez was meant to be one of the best Mexican players since Hugo Sánchez, but various injuries threatened and stopped his career several times. He was one of the top Mexican footballers in the 1990s, but despite the speculations surrounding his talents, he never moved to Europe to play for a much more competitive club.

== Club career ==
Ramirez started his career in Santos Laguna in 1990, and since the beginning, he showed his skills in the midfield. His talent made him one of the most promising players of the time, and was rewarded with a call for the Mexico national football team in 1991.

In the 1991–92 season, in a match against America, Carlos Alberto "El Escorpión" Carrillo, a defender of that team fractured his tibia and fibula. This caused him to miss the Barcelona 1992 Olympic Games with the Mexico team, and a lack of form after the physical recovery. He managed come back after several months, to continue with brilliant displays with Santos Laguna, and in 1993, he recovered his spot in the national team. He played with Santos Laguna until 1994, year in which he played the final of the Mexican tournament, which he lost against Tecos UAG.

His performance in the international tournaments in which Mexico national team participated, attracted the attention of several teams, and in 1994 (after he played in the final with Santos Laguna) he was transferred to Guadalajara, one of the biggest clubs in Mexico. With this team, he lived his best displays on the field. This culminated in 1997, when he got the championship of the Mexican tournament. In 1998, he played another final with Guadalajara against Necaxa, but this time he lost. In 1999, after a lot of speculation and rumors, he was transferred against his will to America, the biggest rival of Guadalajara, a team where he was an idol to the fans. This caused a lot of controversy, since he was an emblematic player of his team.

This transfer to the rival club, caused him a lack of form, perhaps due to depression. This turned to be evident in a match between América and his former team, when he scored a goal: the moment was so shocking for him, that he didn't know how to react. Fortunately for him, that goal didn't count due to offside.

His lack of form ruled him out of América at the end of the Summer 1999 season. He was then, transferred to Tigres UANL. In this team, he had difficult times to recover; he wasn't even registered with his preferred number 7 (retired in honour to the peruvian player Gerónimo Barbadillo in 1982). He slowly found his form again, and this awarded him another call for Mexico national team. In the Winter 2001 season, he played again in the final of the Mexican tournament, but he lost again, this time against Pachuca. However, he played in this match as a substitute.

For the summer 2002 season, he returned to his beloved team Guadalajara. Constant injuries caused him to miss several matches, but again he displayed his talent, although irregularly. He reached the final of the Clausura 2004 season, but lost on penalty kicks against Pumas UNAM. At the end of the Clausura 2004 season, he joined Chivas USA.

In Chivas USA he played the last part of his career, being the captain of the team. He retired from the fields in 2007.

== International career ==
Ramírez received his first call-up to the senior national team in 1991 as a promising young talent, and after recovering from a tibia and fibula fracture in 1993, he played regularly for Mexico until 2000.

His first major appearance for Mexico, was in the Copa América 1993 in Ecuador; the Mexico coach then was Miguel Mejia Baron. Being left-footed, Ramirez was used by the coach as a left-back rather than as a left winger/playmaker, position he had at club level. The Mexican team reached the final, but lost 2–1 against Argentina.

Ramírez was again called to be part of the national team for the World Cup USA 1994, in which he continued playing as left back. The team reached the Round of 16, losing to Bulgaria in penalty kicks.

He also participated in the Copa América Uruguay 1995. The Mexico team performed poorly, and ended in 7th place of 12 teams. They tied to USA in quarter finals and were dismissed on penalty kicks. In 1997, he missed the Copa América in Bolivia.

In 1998, Ramírez returned to participate in the World Cup France 98. In this tournament, he had a more offensive role (the one he used to have in his club), giving one assist to Cuauhtémoc Blanco to score against Belgium. However, he was sent off in the match against Holland (after a confusion of the referee, who was supposed to book another player), so he was suspended to the Round of 16 match against Germany, which eventually was the last match of Mexico.

Ramírez scored 14 goals in 119 caps for his country.

== Accident ==
On 12 December 2000, Ramírez, while driving at high velocity well above the permitted speed limit, collided with another vehicle that left him injured for several months and in the accident it killed an entire family of 5. Professor Efraín Cázarez Barbosa of 31 years old, his pregnant wife Evangelina Rodríguez Aceves of 29 years old, and their children Guillermo Efraín and Adonella Berenice Cázarez Rodríguez of 9 and 5 years old respectively, were killed in the collision. The professor's wife, Evangelina Rodríguez Aceves, was launched from the vehicle into incoming traffic and hit the pavement where she was run over by another car. In February 2002, Ramírez was acquitted of charges of homicide.

== Honours ==
Guadalajara

- Mexican Primera División: Verano 1997

Chivas USA

- Western Conference Regular Season: 2007

Mexico

- FIFA Confederations Cup: 1999
- CONCACAF Gold Cup: 1993, 1996, 1998

Individual

- CONCACAF Gold Cup Golden Ball: 1993
- CONCACAF Gold Cup Best XI: 1998, 2000
- CONCACAF Team of the Century: 1998
- Chivas USA Top Scorer: 2005

== Career statistics ==
Scores and results list Mexico's goal tally first, score column indicates score after each Ramírez goal.

List of international goals scored by Ramón Ramírez
No.	Date	Venue	Opponent	Score	Result	Competition
1	18 April 1993	Estadio Azteca, Mexico City, Mexico	El Salvador	3–0	3–1	1994 FIFA World Cup qualification
2	25 April 1993	Estadio Azteca, Mexico City, Mexico	Canada	1–0	4–0	1994 FIFA World Cup qualification
3	25 April 1993	Estadio Azteca, Mexico City, Mexico	Canada	2–0	4–0	1994 FIFA World Cup qualification
4	30 June 1993	Estadio Olímpico Atahualpa, Quito, Ecuador	Ecuador	2–0	2–0	1993 Copa América
—	11 July 1993	Estadio Azteca, Mexico City, Mexico	Martinique	4–0	9–0	1993 CONCACAF Gold Cup
5	14 December 1994	Estadio Azteca, Mexico City, Mexico	Hungary	4–0	5–1	Friendly
6	13 January 1995	King Fahd II Stadium, Riyadh, Saudi Arabia	Nigeria	1–0	1–1	1995 King Fahd Cup
7	18 May 1996	Soldier Field, Chicago, United States	Slovakia	2–1	5–2	Friendly
8	18 May 1996	Soldier Field, Chicago, United States	Slovakia	5–2	5–2	Friendly
9	21 September 1996	Estadio General Francisco Morazán, San Pedro Sula, Honduras	Honduras	1–1	1–2	1998 FIFA World Cup qualification
10	20 November 1996	Los Angeles Memorial Coliseum, Los Angeles, United States	El Salvador	3–1	3–1	Friendly
11	16 December 1997	King Fahd II Stadium, Riyadh, Saudi Arabia	Brazil	2–3	2–3	1997 FIFA Confederations Cup
12	4 February 1998	Oakland–Alameda County Coliseum, Oakland, United States	Trinidad and Tobago	1–0	4–2	1998 CONCACAF Gold Cup
13	20 February 2000	Qualcomm Stadium, San Diego, United States	Canada	1–0	1–2	2000 CONCACAF Gold Cup
14	3 September 2000	Estadio Azteca, Mexico City, Mexico	Panama	6–1	7–1	2002 FIFA World Cup qualification

== See also ==
- List of football (soccer) players with 100 or more caps
