= José Galván =

Argentine footballer

Personal information
- Full name: José Ernesto Galvan
- Date of birth: 26 March 1981 (age 45)
- Place of birth: San Miguel de Tucumán, Argentina
- Height: 1.72 m (5 ft 8 in)
- Position: Midfielder

Youth career
- 1994–2001: Boca Juniors

Senior career*
Years	Team	Apps	(Gls)
2001–2004	Boca Juniors	0	(0)
2001–2002	→ Necaxa (loan)	0	(0)
2001–2002	→ Cuautitlán (loan)	–	(–)
2003	→ MetroStars (loan)	9	(0)
2004	Chacarita Juniors	5	(0)
2004	MTK Budapest	0	(0)
2005	Manta FC	10	(0)
2006–2007	9 de Julio	37	(4)
2007	Universitario de Sucre	1	(0)
2008	9 de Julio	0	(0)
2008–2009	Atlético Minero	17	(2)
2009–2010	Sportivo Patria	9	(0)
2010–2012	Cobresal	31	(3)
2012–2014	Coquimbo Unido	45	(3)
Total		164	(12)

International career
- Argentina U17
- * Club domestic league appearances and goals

José Ernesto Galván (born 26 March 1981) is an Argentine former professional footballer who played as a midfielder.

== Club career ==
Born in San Miguel de Tucumán, Galván joined the Boca Juniors youth ranks at age 13, making eighteen appearances with five goals for the reserve team. Abroad, Galván played in Mexico, the United States, Hungary, Ecuador, Bolivia, Peru and Chile.

As a member of the Boca Juniors first team since 1999 under Carlos Bianchi, Galván spent a season on loan with Mexican club Cuautitlán, then the B team of Necaxa, and the 2003 season with Major League Soccer club MetroStars. He also made two appearances for Necaxa in the 2001 Copa Merconorte. In February 2003, he failed to sign with Swedish club Malmö FF.

After ending his contract with Boca Juniors, he had a stint with Chacarita Juniors in 2004. In the same year, he moved to Europe and joined Hungarian club MTK Budapest.

Back in South America, he played for Manta FC in Ecuador, 9 de Julio and Sportivo Patria in his homeland, Universitario de Sucre in Bolivia, Atlético Minero in Peru and both Cobresal and Coquimbo Unido in Chile. He ended his career with the last one in 2014.

== International career ==
As a youth player of Boca Juniors, Galván represented the Argentina under-17 national team.

== Personal life ==
He is nicknamed Tucu, a short form of Tucumano, due to his city of birth.
