= Brad Guzan =

American soccer player (born 1984)

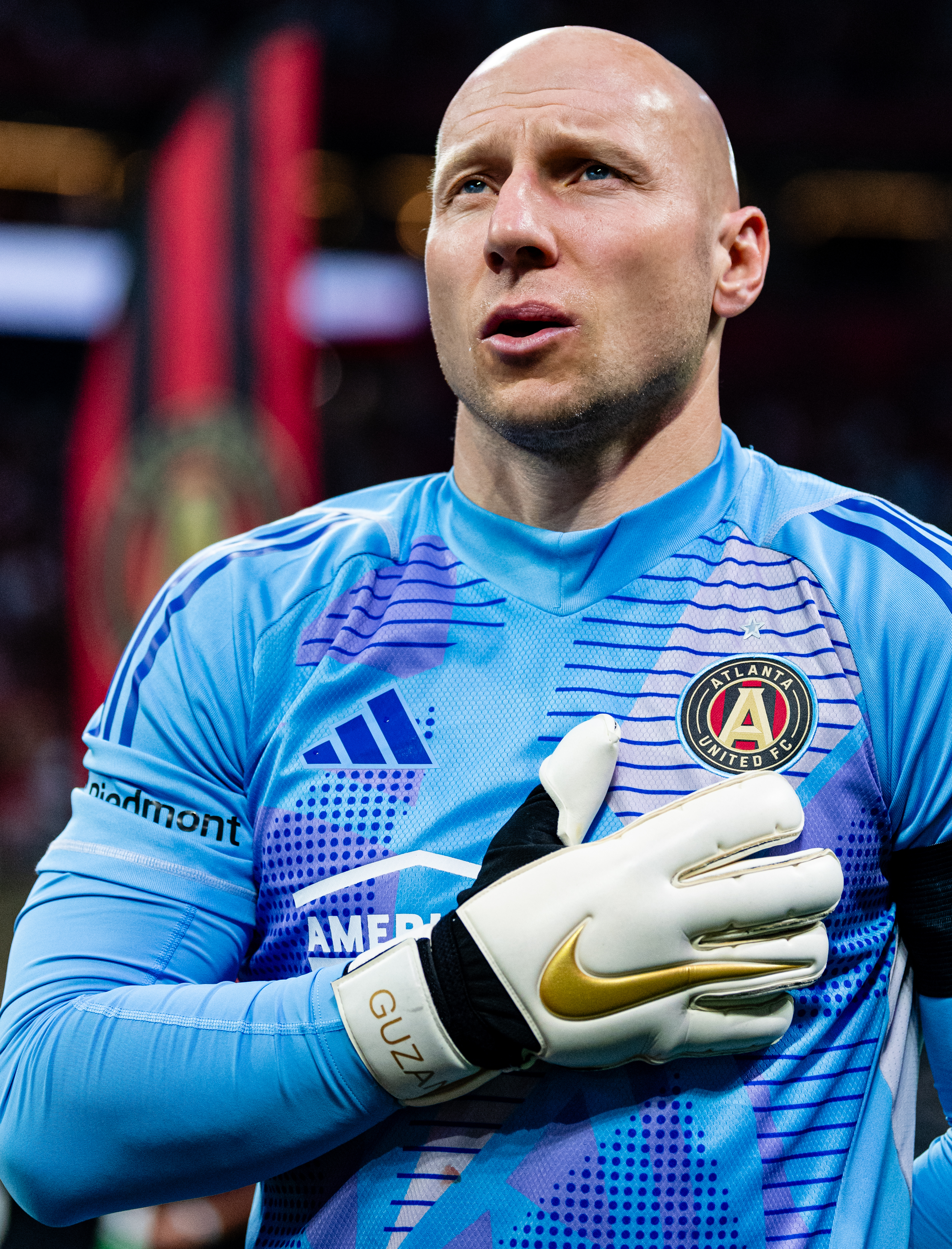
- Guzan with Atlanta United in 2024

Personal information
- Full name: Bradley Edwin Guzan
- Date of birth: September 9, 1984 (age 42)
- Place of birth: Evergreen Park, Illinois, U.S.
- Height: 6 ft 4 in (1.93 m)
- Position: Goalkeeper

Team information
- Current team: Atlanta United (Sporting advisor)

Youth career
- Chicago Magic Soccer Club
- 1999–2003: Providence Catholic High School

College career
Years	Team	Apps	(Gls)
2003–2004	South Carolina Gamecocks	38	(0)

Senior career*
Years	Team	Apps	(Gls)
2004	Chicago Fire Reserves	14	(0)
2005–2008	Chivas USA	79	(0)
2008–2016	Aston Villa	144	(0)
2011	→ Hull City (loan)	16	(0)
2016–2017	Middlesbrough	10	(0)
2017–2025	Atlanta United	225	(0)
Total		488	(0)

International career
2008	United States Olympic (O.P.)	5	(0)
2006–2021	United States	64	(0)
Medal record
Representing United States
Men's soccer
FIFA Confederations Cup
Runner-up	2009 South Africa
CONCACAF Gold Cup
Winner	2007 United States
Winner	2017 United States
Winner	2021 United States
CONCACAF Cup
Runner-up	2015 United States
- * Club domestic league appearances and goals

Bradley Edwin Guzan (/ɡuˈzæn/; born September 9, 1984) is an American former professional soccer player who played as a goalkeeper. He is currently a club ambassador and sporting advisor for Major League Soccer club Atlanta United.

A college soccer second-team All-American for the South Carolina Gamecocks, Guzan was second overall pick in the 2005 MLS SuperDraft, signing for Chivas USA, with whom he was the 2007 MLS Goalkeeper of the Year. In July 2008, he joined Premier League club Aston Villa for a fee of $1 million, where he made 171 total appearances across eight seasons. After a brief spell at Middlesbrough, he returned to the United States with Atlanta United in January 2017, becoming the club's record appearance holder and winning MLS Cup in 2018 before retiring from the sport in 2025.

Guzan made his senior debut for the United States national team in 2006, earning over 60 caps. He was named in their squads for two FIFA World Cups and four CONCACAF Gold Cups, winning the latter in 2007, 2017 and 2021. He also featured for them at the 2008 Olympics, the 2007 Copa América, the 2009 FIFA Confederations Cup and the Copa América Centenario.

== Youth and college soccer ==
Born in Evergreen Park, Illinois, Guzan, who is of Polish-American ancestry, played in his youth at the Chicago Magic Soccer Club and for the varsity soccer team at Providence Catholic High School in Illinois, from which he graduated in 2003. He went on to play two seasons in NCAA competition as a member of the South Carolina Gamecocks men's soccer team, where he was a second-team All-American in his sophomore season.

== Club career ==
=== Chivas USA ===
After spending two years with the Chicago Fire Reserves in the USL Premier Development League, he chose to forgo the rest of his college years, signing a Generation Adidas contract with Major League Soccer (MLS). Chivas USA later drafted Guzan with the second overall pick of the 2005 MLS SuperDraft. On November 7, 2007, Guzan was named MLS Goalkeeper of the Year. During his time at Chivas USA, Guzan was affectionately nicknamed "El Gusano."

=== Aston Villa ===
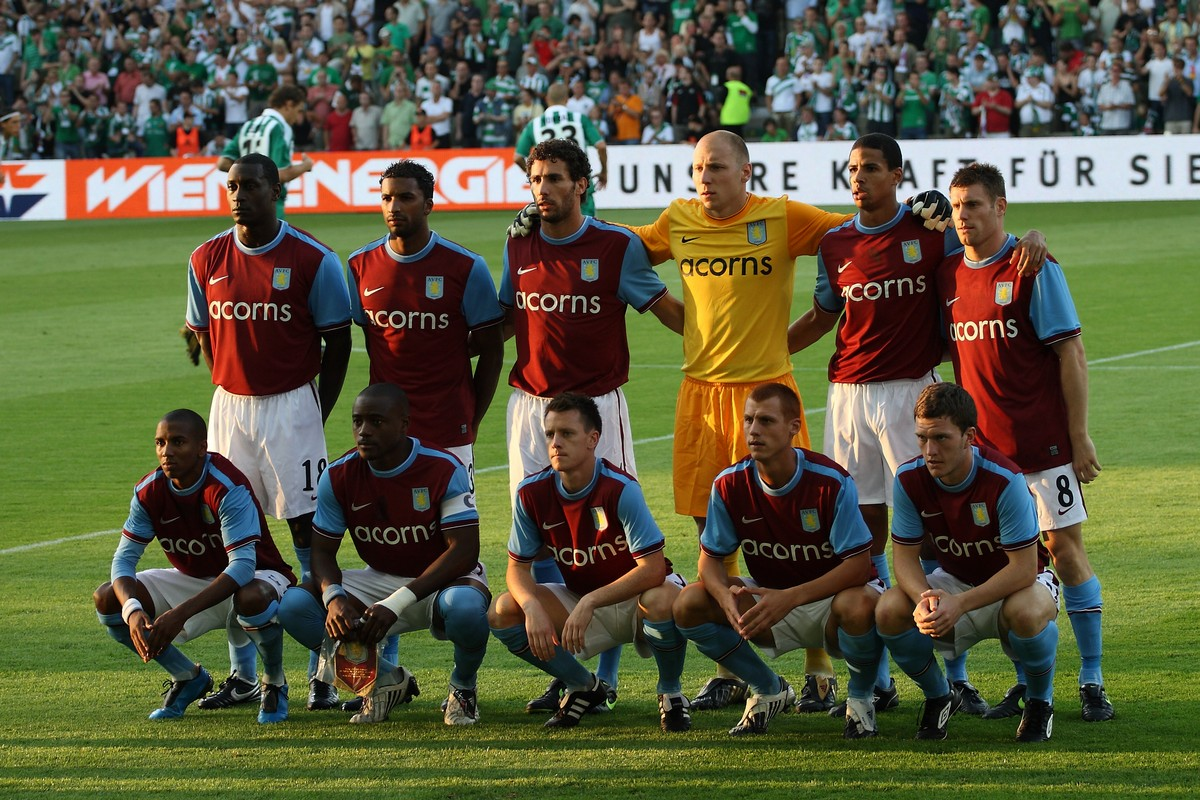
Guzan (dressed in yellow) lines up with Aston Villa teammates prior to a UEFA Europa League match away at Rapid Wien in August 2009

On July 11, 2008, Aston Villa agreed a transfer fee in the region of £600,000, or $1 million, with MLS and Chivas USA to sign Guzan, significantly less than the £2 million agreed to in Aston Villa's failed move for the keeper in January 2008, the difference this time being that Guzan would have been out of his contract at the end of the 2008 season in November, allowing him to sign for Aston Villa during the January transfer window on a free transfer.

On August 1, 2008, Guzan was granted a work permit by the Home Office, allowing him to complete his move to Aston Villa. He was due to be officially introduced by Aston Villa after competing for the United States at the 2008 Summer Olympics in Beijing. Guzan was the second American goalkeeper named Brad to be signed during the summer by Aston Villa, following the capture of Premier League veteran Brad Friedel.

Guzan made his Aston Villa debut in September 2008 in the League Cup at home to Queens Park Rangers. He made his European soccer debut in the UEFA Cup game away at Slavia Prague on November 6, 2008. The match finished 1–0 to Aston Villa, with Guzan making several saves to keep a clean sheet. His performance led to his manager Martin O'Neill describing him as a "class goalkeeper in the making." He also started in Aston Villa's first leg against CSKA Moscow in the round of 32 of the UEFA Cup at Villa Park on February 18, 2009, also later appearing as a substitute against Liverpool after Friedel's red card.

Guzan played in every game that Aston Villa won during their success in the 2009 Peace Cup, against Atlante, Porto and Juventus. He then helped Aston Villa overcome the Italians in the final, most notably in the penalty shootout during which he saved the attempts of Vincenzo Iaquinta and Alessandro Del Piero. The only game that Aston Villa did not win (in the group stages against Málaga) was the one in which Guzan did not feature.

Despite having a successful pre-season period, Guzan was dropped from the first team in favor of Friedel for Aston Villa's opening game of the 2009–10 season against Wigan Athletic. On October 27, 2009, Guzan saved four penalties in one match, one in normal time and three more in a penalty shoot-out win over Sunderland at the Stadium of Light in the last 16 of the League Cup. Despite these heroics, however, Friedel replaced him in goal for the final against Manchester United.

==== Hull City (loan) ====
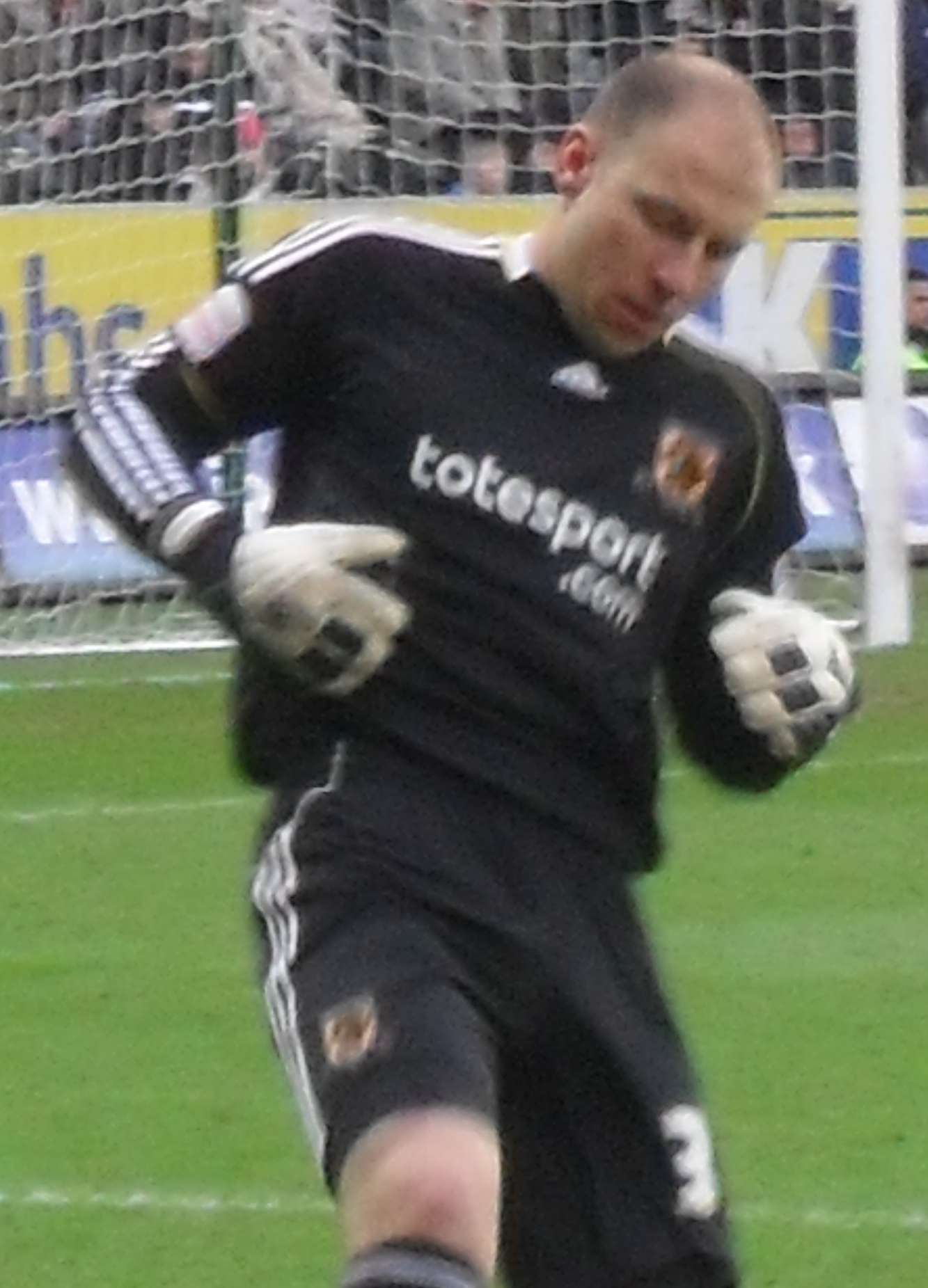
Guzan playing for Hull City in 2011

On December 31, 2010, Guzan was loaned to Football League Championship side Hull City on a one-month loan deal. He made his debut for Hull on New Year's Day 2011, a 1–0 loss to Leicester City. His second appearance for the club ended on a higher note, as his team went on to win 2–3 at Portsmouth. He kept his first clean sheet for the club against Barnsley in a 2–0 win for Hull. On January 25, Guzan extended his loan until the end of February. He made a total of 11 league appearances for Hull before returning to Aston Villa on February 28.

On March 8, however, Hull re-signed Guzan on an emergency loan deal due to an injury to goalkeeper Vito Mannone. Guzan's first appearance back at the club was in a home match against Burnley. Guzan's last game for Hull City came in a 1–2 win away at Watford on April 9, 2011, after which he returned to Aston Villa.

==== Return to Aston Villa ====
On December 3, 2011, Guzan made his second Premier League appearance for Aston Villa, coming on for the injured Shay Given against Manchester United. Given had been ruled out for a month with a torn hamstring so Guzan retained his place in the first team, giving him an extended run in Aston Villa's first team.

Guzan was released by Villa at the end of his contract in June 2012. However, he was linked with a return to the club over the summer in a situation similar to that of fellow Aston Villa goalkeeper Andy Marshall in 2010. On July 16, 2012, Guzan was included in new manager Paul Lambert's 25-man squad for Aston Villa's tour of the United States and on the same day, the player confirmed via Twitter that he had renewed his contract and rejoined the club.

He made his return for Aston Villa against Newcastle United putting in a Man of the Match performance in a 1–1 draw at St James' Park. He kept Villa's first clean sheet of the season in a 2–0 win against Swansea City and performed well enough to keep his position in the starting lineup. At the end of the 2012–13 Premier League season, he was voted the Aston Villa Player of the Year thanks to his large contribution to Villa's bid to avoid relegation. On July 6, 2013, Guzan was rewarded for his play and signed a four-year contract extension with the Midlands club.

On July 18, 2013, Guzan stated that he hoped to give Aston Villa the best years of his career and said that signing a new contract was a "no-brainer."

On September 28, 2013, Guzan remarkably earned an assist on an Andreas Weimann goal in a 3–2 win over Manchester City in which Paul Lambert praised Guzan's distribution technique for goal kicks.

During the 2014–15 season, Guzan was dropped by new Aston Villa manager Tim Sherwood after a high-profile error against Manchester City gifted Sergio Agüero the opening goal in a 3–2 defeat on April 25, 2015, with Shay Given taking his place for the final games of the Premier League season. Guzan also missed out on Aston Villa's run to the 2015 FA Cup Final, with Given playing in every round.

=== Middlesbrough ===
On July 29, 2016, Guzan signed a two-year contract with newly promoted Premier League club Middlesbrough, joining on a free transfer, after Aston Villa were relegated to the Championship. He made his league debut for the club in a 2–1 win away at Sunderland.

=== Atlanta United ===
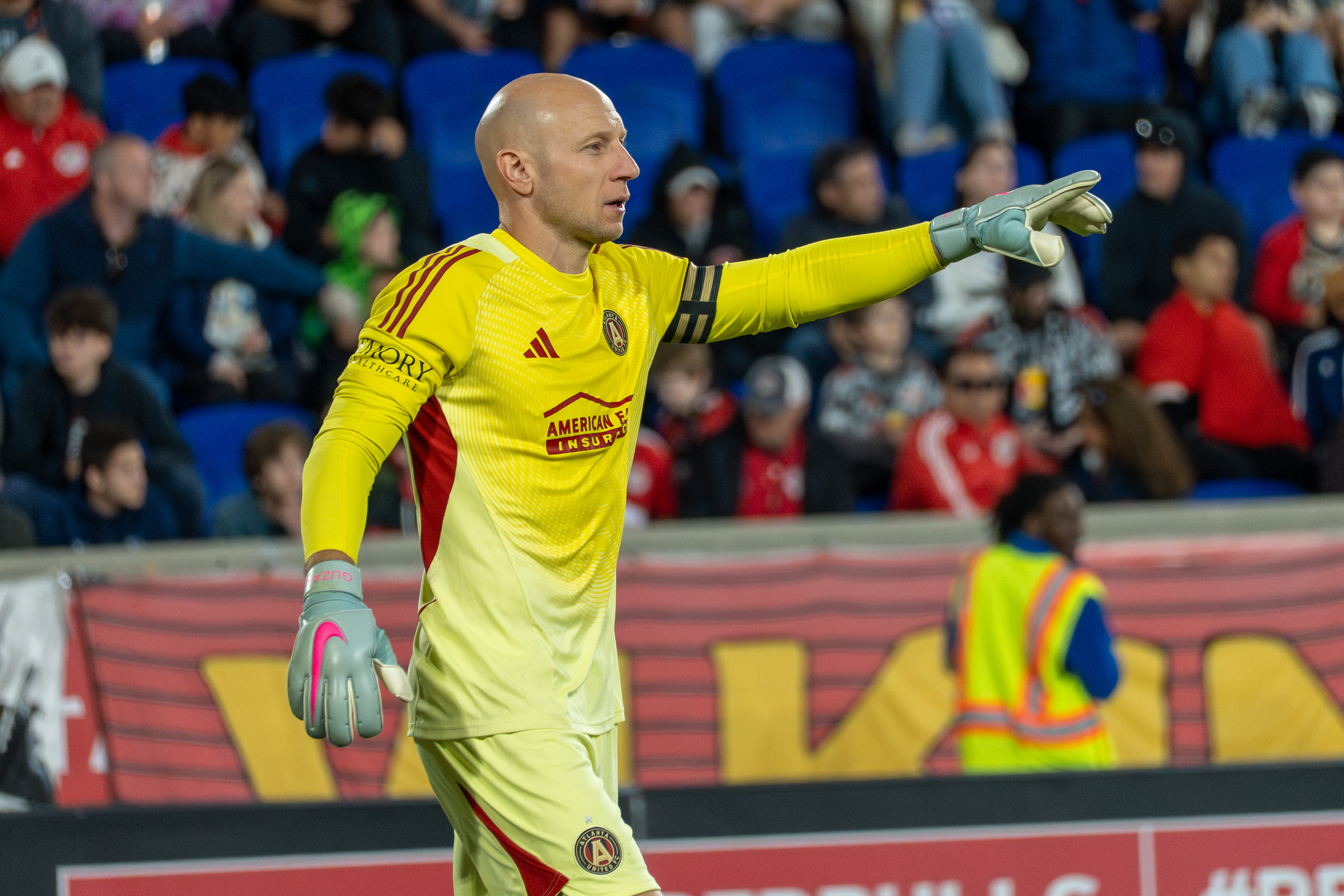
Brad Guzan with Atlanta United in 2025

On January 26, 2017, it was confirmed that Guzan had signed a contract with recently formed MLS team Atlanta United on a free transfer, and would return to the United States following the conclusion of the 2016–17 Premier League season, after nine years in English football. He left Middlesbrough on June 10, 2017. For the remainder of the 2017 MLS season, Guzan wore the number 1 shirt. Guzan made his Atlanta United debut on July 24, 2017, a 1–0 road victory against Orlando City SC. During the 2017 MLS season, Guzan started 14 games, posted a 6–1–7 record, and kept eight clean sheets. He led the MLS in save percentage (79.2%) and won MLS Save of the Week three times. In 2018 Guzan won the MLS Cup with Atlanta United after a 2–0 victory over the Portland Timbers.

Following the conclusion of the 2025 regular season on October 18, Guzan officially retired from professional soccer at the age of 41, finishing his time in Atlanta with 225 appearances, the most in the club's history, as well as being their longest serving captain.

== International career ==
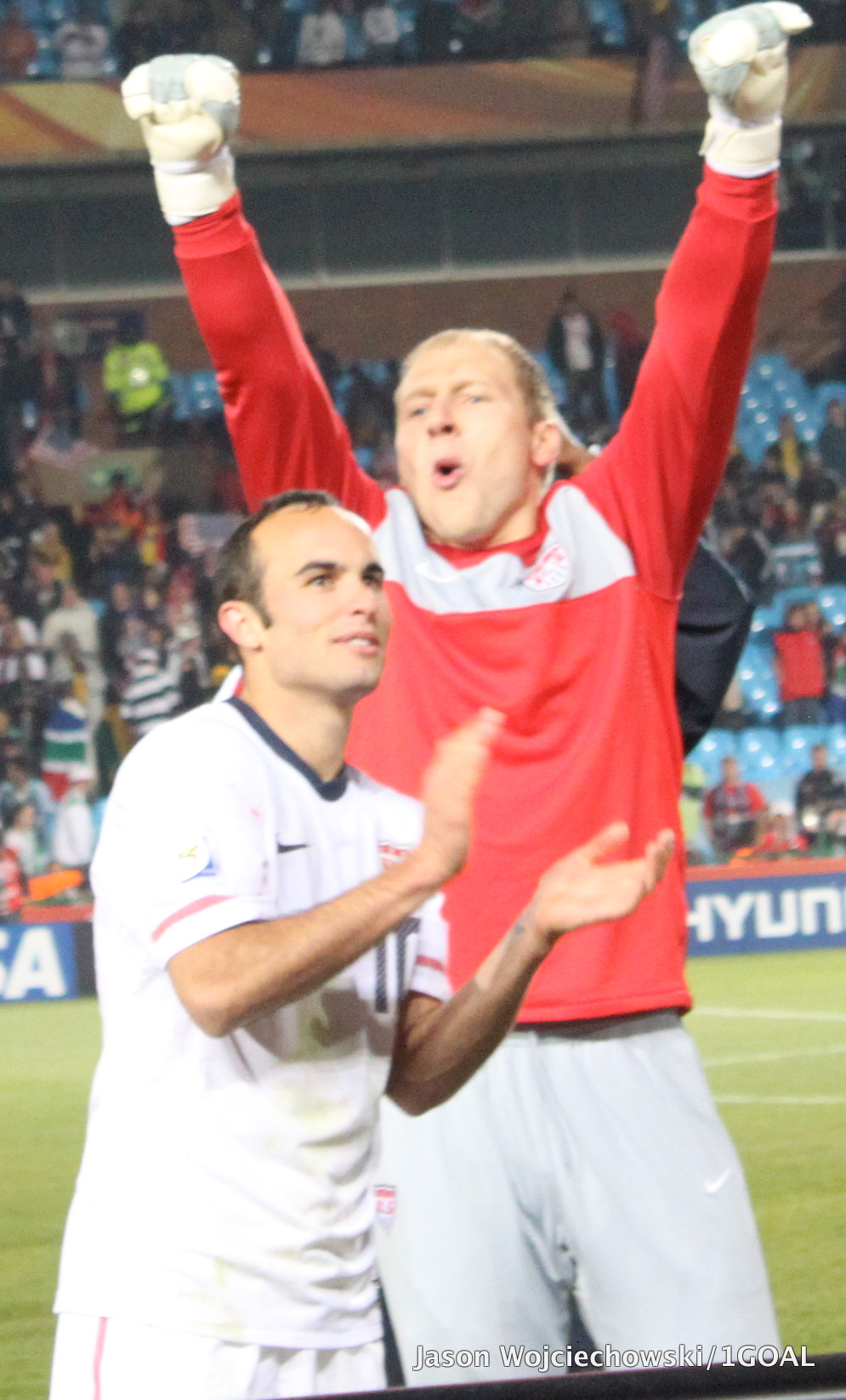
Guzan (right) with the United States national team at the 2010 FIFA World Cup.

Guzan made his United States national team debut on February 19, 2006, in a friendly 4–0 win over Guatemala in Frisco, Texas. He played the first 80 minutes before being replaced by fellow debutant Zach Wells. He was a non-playing member of the side that won the 2007 CONCACAF Gold Cup. He was called up for the 2007 Copa América in Venezuela, where he played in a 1–0 loss to Colombia for his next cap on July 5.

Guzan made his World Cup qualifying debut in the second leg of a second round qualifier against Barbados on June 14, 2008, in an 8–0 home victory. Weeks later, he was chosen for the Olympic team for the tournament in China, where he kept a shutout in an opening 1–0 win over Japan. When the United States came runners-up at the 2009 FIFA Confederations Cup in South Africa, he played in a 3–0 group victory against Egypt that put the team into the semi-finals at the expense of their opponents and Italy.

Guzan was unused at the 2010 FIFA World Cup and played no international games between that November and May 2012, when he came on as a substitute for Tim Howard near the end of a 5–1 friendly win over Scotland in Jacksonville. Howard took an international sabbatical after starting at the 2014 FIFA World Cup, during which Guzan was first-choice. At the 2015 CONCACAF Gold Cup, in which the United States came fourth, Guzan and Michael Bradley were the only two Americans to start every game; he won the Golden Glove. Howard returned to the team for 2016's Copa América Centenario, but Guzan kept his place in a run to the semi-finals.

Guzan was in the American side that won the 2017 CONCACAF Gold Cup. He played the first two group games before Bill Hamid took his place for the third, then he and Sean Johnson were replaced in the squad by Howard and Jesse González. He was unused as the Americans won again in 2021.

== After football ==
In January 2026, Atlanta United announced that Guzan was returning to the club as Club Ambassador and Sporting Advisor.

== Personal life ==
Guzan is a Christian. Guzan has spoken about his faith, saying, "My personal life, my faith life and my sport life – they all come together. I think they have to. You don't have one without the others, and you have to have Jesus in your life. That is how I get through my personal life, how I get through my professional life – following Christ. ... we all need Christ in our lives. Money, fame, all those objects, they don't mean anything if you don't have Jesus in your life. All of those things can be gone in the blink of an eye. We can't get caught up in it."

== Career statistics ==
=== Club ===
Appearances and goals by club, season and competition
Club	Season	League			National cup (Note: Includes U.S. Open Cup and FA Cup)		League cup (Note: Includes PDL Playoffs, MLS Cup playoffs and Football League/EFL Cup)		Continental		Other		Total	
Club	Season	Division	Apps	Goals	Apps	Goals	Apps	Goals	Apps	Goals	Apps	Goals	Apps	Goals
Chicago Fire Reserves	2004	PDL	14	0	—		2	0	—		—		16	0
Chivas USA	2005	Major League Soccer	24	0	2	0	—		—		—		26	0
Chivas USA	2006	Major League Soccer	13	0	1	0	2	0	—		—		16	0
Chivas USA	2007	Major League Soccer	27	0	0	0	2	0	—		—		29	0
Chivas USA	2008	Major League Soccer	15	0	1	0	—		—		—		16	0
Chivas USA	Total		79	0	4	0	4	0	—		—		87	0
Aston Villa	2008–09	Premier League	1	0	1	0	1	0	5 (Note: Appearances in UEFA Europa League)	0	—		8	0
Aston Villa	2009–10	Premier League	0	0	3	0	5	0	2	0	—		10	0
Aston Villa	2010–11	Premier League	0	0	0	0	1	0	2	0	—		3	0
Aston Villa	2011–12	Premier League	7	0	1	0	1	0	—		—		9	0
Aston Villa	2012–13	Premier League	36	0	0	0	1	0	—		—		37	0
Aston Villa	2013–14	Premier League	38	0	0	0	0	0	—		—		38	0
Aston Villa	2014–15	Premier League	34	0	0	0	0	0	—		—		34	0
Aston Villa	2015–16	Premier League	28	0	2	0	2	0	—		—		32	0
Aston Villa	Total		144	0	7	0	11	0	9	0	—		171	0
Hull City (loan)	2010–11	Championship	16	0	0	0	0	0	—		—		16	0
Middlesbrough	2016–17	Premier League	10	0	3	0	1	0	—		—		14	0
Atlanta United	2017	Major League Soccer	14	0	0	0	1	0	—		—		15	0
Atlanta United	2018	Major League Soccer	33	0	0	0	5	0	—		—		38	0
Atlanta United	2019	Major League Soccer	34	0	4	0	3	0	4 (Note: Appearances in CONCACAF Champions League)	0	—		45	0
Atlanta United	2020	Major League Soccer	23 (Note: Includes three appearances in MLS is Back Tournament group stage)	0	—		—		4	0	—		27	0
Atlanta United	2021	Major League Soccer	29	0	—		1	0	3	0	—		33	0
Atlanta United	2022	Major League Soccer	7	0	—		—		—		—		7	0
Atlanta United	2023	Major League Soccer	27	0	0	0	3	0	—		2 (Note: Appearances in Leagues Cup)	0	32	0
Atlanta United	2024	Major League Soccer	32	0	0	0	5	0	—		0	0	37	0
Atlanta United	2025	Major League Soccer	26	0	—		—		—		2	0	28	0
Atlanta United	Total		225	0	4	0	18	0	11	0	4	0	262	0
Career total			488	0	18	0	36	0	20	0	4	0	566	0

=== International ===
Appearances and goals by national team and year
National team	Year	Apps	Goals
United States	2006	1	0
United States	2007	3	0
United States	2008	7	0
United States	2009	4	0
United States	2010	4	0
United States	2011	0	0
United States	2012	1	0
United States	2013	4	0
United States	2014	4	0
United States	2015	13	0
United States	2016	12	0
United States	2017	5	0
United States	2018	2	0
United States	2019	4	0
Total		64	0

== Honors ==
Chicago Fire Reserves

- USL PDL Heartland Division: 2004
- USL PDL Regular Season: 2004

Chivas USA

- Western Conference Regular Season: 2007

Aston Villa

- FA Cup runner-up: 2014–15
- Football League Cup runner-up: 2009–10

Atlanta United

- MLS Cup: 2018
- Eastern Conference Playoffs: 2018
- U.S. Open Cup: 2019
- Campeones Cup: 2019

United States

- FIFA Confederations Cup runner-up: 2009
- CONCACAF Gold Cup: 2007, 2017, 2021

Individual

- NCAA Second-Team All-American: 2004
- MLS SuperDraft Second Overall Pick: 2005
- MLS Best XI: 2007
- MLS Goalkeeper of the Year: 2007
- Aston Villa Player of the Season: 2012–13
- CONCACAF Gold Cup Golden Glove: 2015
- MLS Save of the Year: 2017
- MLS All-Star: 2018, 2019
