= Olga Loera =

Mexican-American glamour model (born 1979)

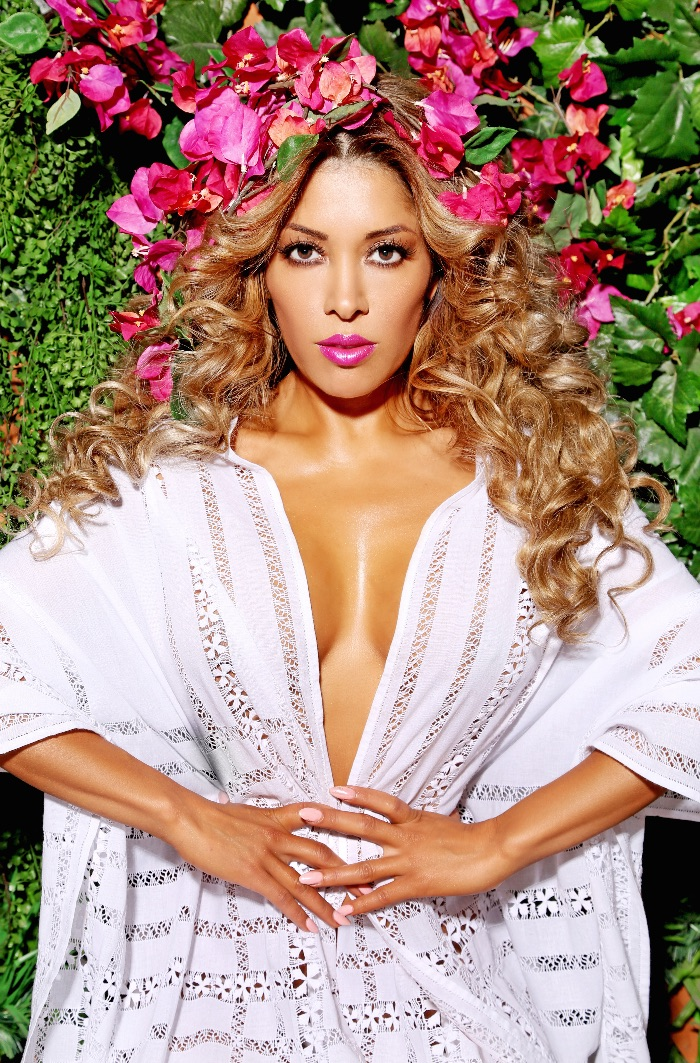
- Loera in a spring look for a fashion shoot
- Born: Olga Lidia Loera Martinez; February 19, 1980 (age 46); Ojocaliente, Calvillo, Aguascalientes, Mexico
- Children: 2 (21 years old and 13 years old)
- Modeling information
- Hair color: Blonde
- Eye color: Brown
- Agency: Donner Management International

Olga Loera (born Olga Lidia Loera Martinez) is a Mexican-American glamour model who has modeled for editorial photo shoots, commercial advertising campaigns, as well as in film and television. She has also worked as a celebrity hair stylist and makeup artist.

== Career ==
Loera has worked as a celebrity beautician on photo shoots, fashion shows, film sets as well as a stylist in radio and television. In 2001 she put together a team of make up artist and hair stylist and founded Team Indulge. It was in this capacity that Olga first came to work for Playboy, doing hair and makeup at the Playboy Mansion for playmates like Holly Madison, Kendra Wilkinson, and Tina Marie Jordan. It was at this point Loera decided to once again pursue a career in modeling. In January 2013 she was named Playboy Mexico's Cyber Girl of the Month and once again in December of the same year. She has held the title of Mrs. Latina Global 2013 and also served as a judge in the competition. In 2014 she was named a spokesmodel for Dama Tequila and Spearmint Rhino International. In April 2014, she was named Playboy Mexico's Playmate of the Month. She was featured on the cover of StipLV magazine's July 2014 issue. In February 2015, Olga was named Playboy Venezuela's Playmate of the Month. in July 2015 she appeared on the cover of Low Rider Magazine. In September 2015, Loera was featured in the pages of Mexico Chilanga Surf. In 2017, her photos with Thierry Brouard made the Cover and Centerfold of Playboy Mexico and Playboy Slovakia. She was the first Playmate in America to be painted by fine artist Olivia de Berardinis, an official Playboy artist.)

Olga Loera, born and raised in Mexico
