= Esteban Arias =

American soccer player

Personal information
- Full name: Esteban Arias
- Date of birth: August 26, 1982 (age 44)
- Place of birth: Bakersfield, California, United States
- Height: 5 ft 10 in (1.78 m)
- Position: Defender

College career
| Years | Team | Apps | (Gls) |
| 2001 | Albertus Magnus Falcons | | |
| 2002–2004 | UConn Huskies | | |

Senior career*
| Years | Team | Apps | (Gls) |
| 2005–2006 | Chivas USA | 19 | (1) |
| 2008–2009 | Bakersfield Brigade | 25 | (0) |
- * Club domestic league appearances and goals as of 22 July 2009

Esteban Arias (born August 26, 1982, Bakersfield, CA) is an American former soccer player of Mexican heritage.

== Career ==
=== College ===
Arias began his college soccer career at Albertus Magnus College in 2001. After one year there he transferred to the University of Connecticut, where he played in 54 games in three seasons and managed 1 goal and 7 assists.

=== Professional ===
Arias was selected in the fourth round (38th overall) in the 2005 MLS SuperDraft by Chivas. He made his professional debut for Chivas on July 9, 2005, in a 5–1 win over Real Salt Lake, and went on to make 19 appearances and score 1 goal in his two years with the team, before being waived at the end of the 2006 season.

Arias signed with his home town team, Bakersfield Brigade of the USL Premier Development League, in 2008.
