= Antonio Martínez (footballer, born 1977) =

Association football player

Personal information
- Full name: Antonio Martínez
- Date of birth: July 9, 1977 (age 49)
- Place of birth: Jalisco, Mexico
- Height: 5 ft 7 in (1.70 m)
- Position: Midfielder

Youth career
- Cal State Fullerton

Senior career*
Years	Team	Apps	(Gls)
2000–2003	Dallas Burn	65	(9)
2000	→ MLS Pro-40 (loan)	2	(1)
2003	Los Angeles Galaxy	4	(1)
2004	Salamanca	3	(0)
2004	Necaxa	1	(0)
2005	Chivas USA	25	(2)
- * Club domestic league appearances and goals

Antonio "Chivas" Martínez (born 9 July 1977) is a Mexican former professional footballer who last played as a midfielder for Major League Soccer club Chivas USA.

Nicknamed "Chivas" for his devotion to Chivas de Guadalajara, Martínez played college football at Cal State Fullerton and was drafted by the then-Dallas Burn in the second round of the 2000 MLS SuperDraft. Martínez played three and a half seasons for Dallas, leading the team in assists in 2002, setting a club record for assists in a game, with three.

Martinez was traded to the Los Angeles Galaxy, scoring a goal in his debut game. Martinez spent the first half 2004 with Spain's Salamanca where he became the first Mexican to play for the club in its eighty-five year history. Joined Mexico's Necaxa for the Torneo de Invierno 2004 season. Martínez came back to MLS in 2005, his rights were traded from Galaxy to Chivas USA, a team he seemed destined to play for. Martinez finished the year second in the team for scoring. He has scored 10 goals and 26 assists in five years of MLS league play. Martínez was released by Chivas prior to the 2006 season.

== Statistics ==
Year	Club	GP	GS	MIN	G	A	SHT	SOG	FC	FS	YC	RC
2000	Dallas Burn	17	5	701	2	3	9	5	15	20	1	0
2001	Dallas Burn	19	10	1,060	1	9	9	4	16	19	2	0
2002	Dallas Burn	29	22	2,002	5	11	30	13	26	38	1	1
2003	Dallas Burn	10	5	564	0	1	11	4	4	15	0	0
2003	Los Angeles Galaxy	4	3	212	1	0	2	1	3	4	0	0
2003–04	Salamanca	3	0	61	0	0	4	3	4	6	2	0
2004	Necaxa	1	0	18	0	0	1	1	0	1	0	0
2005	Chivas USA	25	16	1,602	2	3	24	11	21	34	5	0
Career totals		129	77	7,763	13	30	109	49	106	164	14	1
