= Evan Whitfield =

American soccer player (born 1977)

Personal information
- Full name: Evan Dylan Whitfield
- Date of birth: June 23, 1977 (age 49)
- Place of birth: Phoenix, Arizona, United States
- Height: 5 ft 11 in (1.80 m)
- Position: Defender

Youth career
- 1997: Tucson Amigos
- 1995–1998: Duke Blue Devils

Senior career*
Years	Team	Apps	(Gls)
1999	KAA Gent	2	(0)
1999–2004	Chicago Fire	103	(3)
2005	Real Salt Lake	5	(0)

International career
1999–2000	US U-23	11	(0)
- * Club domestic league appearances and goals

Evan Dylan Whitfield (born June 23, 1977) is a retired American soccer player who spent seven seasons in Major League Soccer.

== Player ==
=== Youth ===
Whitfield graduated from Brophy College Preparatory in Phoenix. He was the 1995 Arizona 5A Player of the Year as he took Brophy to the Arizona high school soccer championship. Whitfield was also a Parade Magazine All American. In 1997, Whitfield played for the Tucson Amigos in the USISL. He played college soccer at Duke University from 1995 to 1998. In seventy-five games, he scored one goal and added fifteen assists.

=== Professional ===
On February 6, 1999, the Chicago Fire selected Whitfield in the first round (eleventh overall) of the 1999 MLS College Draft. He did not join the Fire, but signed with Belgian club KAA Gent. Not being able to break into the first team in Europe, he came back to MLS and joined the Fire midway through the 1999 soccer season. He missed most of the 2002 season with a torn ACL). In 2000 and 2003, the Fire to the US Open Cup in 2000 and 2003. In December 2004, the Fire traded Whitfield and Dipsy Selolwane to the expansion Real Salt Lake in exchange for Salt Lake's 2005 third round and 2006 second round draft picks. He played five games for Salt Lake before being released mid-season.

=== International ===
Whitfield played for the United States in the 2000 Summer Olympics,

== Post-playing career ==
In May 2006, Whitfield graduated from DePaul Law. He then worked as an associate at Schiller, DuCanto & Fleck LLP. In 2011, Whitfield became a commentator for Chicago Fire games.
