= Alfonso Loera =

Mexican footballer (born 1978)

Personal information
- Full name: Alfonso Loera Pico
- Date of birth: December 4, 1978 (age 47)
- Place of birth: Ensenada, Mexico
- Height: 5 ft 9 in (1.75 m)
- Position: Defender

Senior career*
Years	Team	Apps	(Gls)
2000–2003	Chivas de Guadalajara	41	(0)
2004	La Piedad		
2005	Chivas USA	12	(0)
2005	CD Tapatio		
2006	Guerreros de Tabasco		
2007–2009	Rochester Rhinos	19	(1)

Managerial career
- 2025: Ensenada
- * Club domestic league appearances and goals as of 28 June 2025

Alfonso Loera Pico (born December 4, 1978) is a Mexican former professional footballer.

== Career ==
Loera began his career with Chivas de Guadalajara in 2000 after impressing the team's coaching staff at an open tryout. He played for one of Chivas's farm teams, La Piedad, and then spent part of the 2005 Major League Soccer season with C.D. Chivas USA before being released by the end of the 2005 season.

After a couple of years playing in the Mexican lower leagues with CD Tapatio and Guerreros de Tabasco, Loera signed with the Rochester Rhinos in the USL First Division on July 30, 2007. He played only two games in his debut season but was a regular starter during the 2008 season.
