= Héctor Cuadros =

Mexican footballer (born 1983)

Personal information
- Date of birth: March 20, 1983 (age 43)
- Place of birth: Guadalajara, Mexico
- Height: 1.81 m (5 ft 11 in)
- Position: Midfielder

Youth career
- –2003: Guadalajara U-20
- 2003–2005: Guadalajara II

Senior career*
Years	Team	Apps	(Gls)
2005	Chivas USA	26	(4)
2006	Delfines		
2006	Guerreros de Tabasco		
2007	Tijuana		
2008	Petroleros de Salamanca		
2009	Estudiantes Tecos II		
- * Club domestic league appearances and goals

Héctor Cuadros (born March 20, 1983) is a Mexican former professional footballer who played as a midfielder.

== Career ==
Cuadros spent the 2005 Major League Soccer season with C.D. Chivas USA. Cuadros came to Chivas USA as one of imports from parent club Chivas de Guadalajara. Nicknamed El Grillo, he became the expansion club's first starting central midfielder and scored the penalty kick goal that gave Chivas USA their first win ever, 1–0 over fellow expansion team Real Salt Lake. He suffered a concussion after a clash with New England Revolution defender Joey Franchino. Cuadros was released by Chivas USA in November 2005 despite leading the team in goals with four. In December 2005, Chivas loaned Cuadros to Delfines de Coatzacoalcos a team in the Mexican Primera A (second division) on a 6-month loan.
