= Arturo Torres (soccer, born 1980) =

American soccer player

Personal information
- Full name: Arturo Torres
- Date of birth: December 11, 1980 (age 45)
- Place of birth: Harbor City, California, United States
- Height: 6 ft 1 in (1.85 m)
- Position: Defender

College career
Years	Team	Apps	(Gls)
1999–2002	Loyola Marymount Lions		

Senior career*
Years	Team	Apps	(Gls)
2003–2004	Los Angeles Galaxy	27	(1)
2005	Chivas USA	23	(2)
2007	Bakersfield Brigade	1	(0)
- * Club domestic league appearances and goals

Arturo Torres (born December 11, 1980) is an American soccer player, the first player in the history of Chivas USA of Major League Soccer.

Torres played college soccer at Loyola Marymount University from 1999 to 2002. As a freshman, although he only started 13 of 18 games, Torres scored 16 goals and 4 assists, and was a first-team All-WCC selection. Torres had continued success in 2000, registering 11 goals and 10 assists, and was named the WCC Co-Player of the Year. As a junior, Torres was again a first-team All-WCC selection, after scoring 11 goals and 3 assists. As a senior, he scored 8 goals and 13 assists, and was named to the All-WCC first team for the fourth straight year. He finished his career at LMU with 46 goals and 22 assists.

Upon graduating, Torres was selected 19th overall by the Los Angeles Galaxy in the 2003 MLS SuperDraft and signed to a developmental contract. In his first year, he appeared in nine games, starting three. In 2004, he appeared in 18 games, scoring a goal and two assists. Despite the meek numbers, Chivas USA made Torres the first official player in club history, drafting him first overall in the 2004 MLS Expansion Draft. He would go on to play 23 games for the club during the 2005 season, scoring 2 goals.

== Personal life ==
Torres was born in the United States to Mexican parents.
