= Douglas Sequeira =

Costa Rican footballer (born 1977)

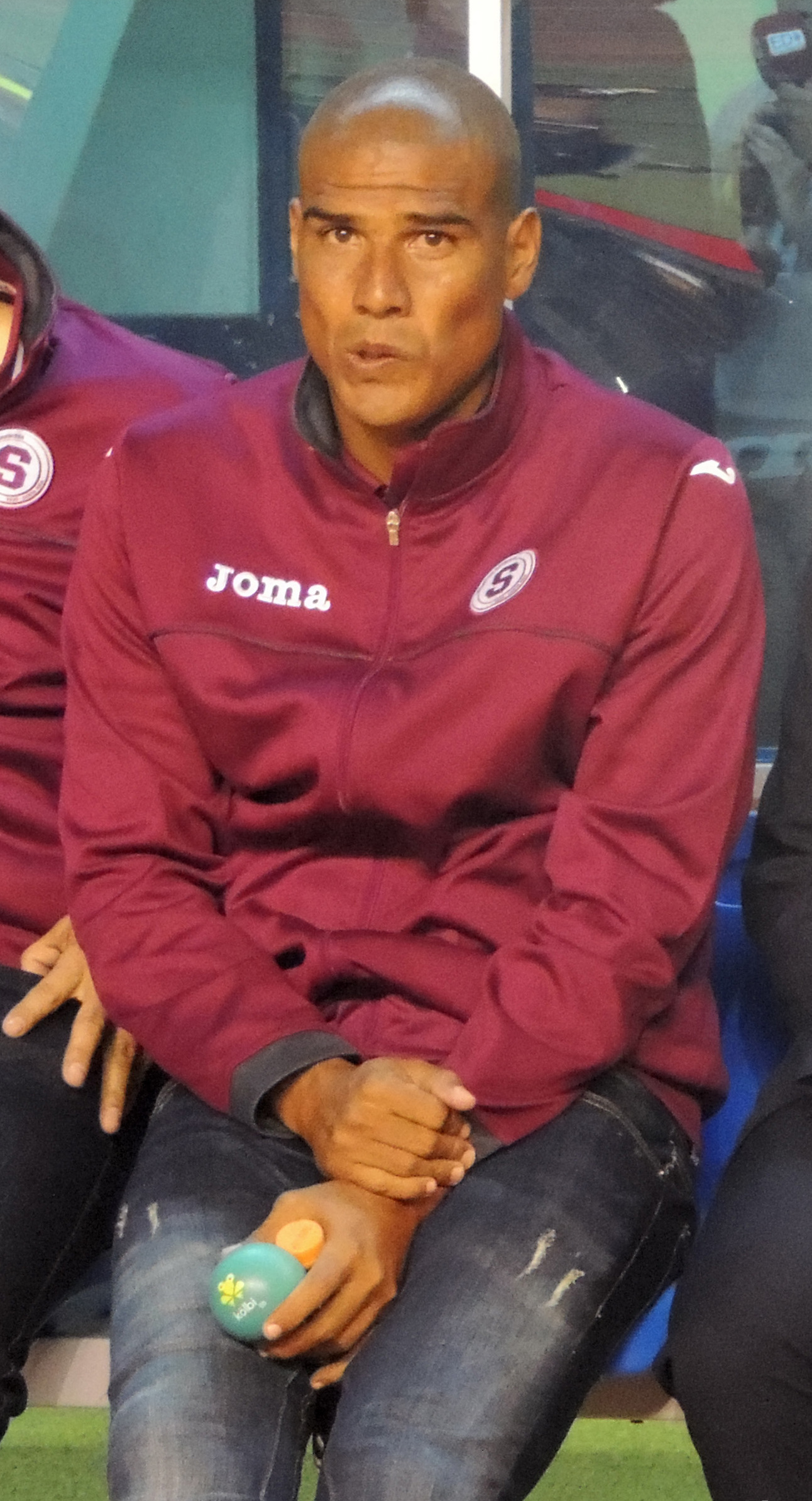
- Sequeira as part of Saprissa's coaching staff

Personal information
- Full name: Douglas Esteban Sequeira Solano
- Date of birth: 23 August 1977 (age 49)
- Place of birth: San José, Costa Rica
- Height: 1.86 m (6 ft 1 in)
- Positions: Defender; midfielder

Youth career
- Saprissa

Senior career*
Years	Team	Apps	(Gls)
1995–1997	Saprissa	10	(1)
1997–1999	Feyenoord	0	(0)
1998	→ Excelsior (loan)		
1999–2000	Karlsruher SC	24	(0)
2000–2005	Saprissa		
2005	Chivas USA	23	(2)
2006	Real Salt Lake	18	(1)
2007–2009	Tromsø	63	(7)
2009–2013	Saprissa	127	(10)

International career
1999–2010	Costa Rica	42	(2)
- * Club domestic league appearances and goals

Douglas Esteban Sequeira Solano (Also known as El Esqueleto Sequeira) (born 23 August 1977) is a Costa Rican former professional footballer who played as a defender.

== Club career ==
=== Early career ===
Sequeira started his career in Costa Rica by playing for Saprissa in 1995. He moved abroad after the 1997 FIFA World Youth Championship to spend time in Europe with Feyenoord, who loaned him to then feeder club Excelsior for whom he made his debut in the Eerste Divisie against Emmen on 18 October 1997. In 1999, he signed for two years for German second division side Karlsruhe alongside compatriot Mínor Díaz, playing 24 matches, before returning to Costa Rica and Saprissa.

=== Major League Soccer ===
He was originally acquired by Major League Soccer and Real Salt Lake from Saprissa in exchange for Pablo Brenes, and was immediately sent to Chivas USA for a draft pick, and spent a year with the team. Subsequently, Sequeira ended up at Real Salt Lake but was waived following the 2006 season.

=== Tromsø ===
In December 2006, he signed a three-year contract with Norwegian club Tromsø. Sequeira got a good start to his career at Tromsø, scoring the 1–0 winning goal in the 8th minute of his first official match for the club, against Vålerenga on 9 April 2007. On 30 July 2009, Sequeira played his last match for Tromsø at Alfheim Stadion. He will return to Costa Rica and Saprissa, after playing against Vålerenga on 9 August 2009.

After playing a few more seasons for Saprissa, Sequeira retired in November 2013 and became manager of Saprissa's youth team.

== International career ==
Sequeira has played for the Costa Rica national football team on various youth levels, and received his first senior cap in a February 1999 friendly match against Jamaica. Since then he has represented the national team 42 times scoring twice. He played in the 1997 FIFA World Youth Championship, held in Malaysia, and the 2006 FIFA World Cup.

FIFA suspended Sequeira for three matches following an incident where he kneed an opponent in the stomach during a 3–0 loss to the United States during qualifying for the 2006 FIFA World Cup.

His final international was an August 2010 friendly match against Paraguay.

=== International goals ===
Scores and results list Costa Rica's goal tally first.

N.	Date	Venue	Opponent	Score	Result	Competition
1.	12 June 2004	Estadio Pedro Marrero, Havana, Cuba	Cuba	1–0	2–2	2006 FIFA World Cup qualification
2.	25 February 2005	Estadio Mateo Flores, Guatemala City, Guatemala	Guatemala	2–0	4–0	2005 UNCAF Nations Cup

== Personal life ==
Sequeira is married to Andrea Borbón and they have a son, Douglas, and a daughter, Brianna. His older brother, Alejandro Sequeira played as forward.
