= List of Chivas USA seasons =

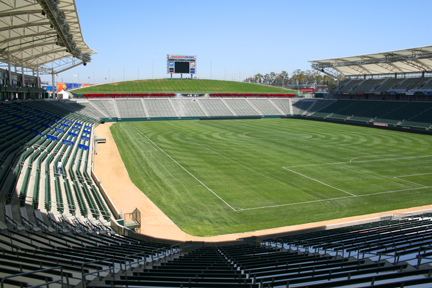
Chivas USA played their home matches in the Home Depot Center, which they shared with the LA Galaxy.

Chivas USA was a soccer team based in Carson, California that competed in Major League Soccer (MLS) from 2005 until it folded after the 2014 season. The MLS regular season runs from February to October and the best-performing team is awarded the Supporters' Shield. The top teams from each conference qualify for the MLS Cup Playoffs, a postseason tournament that culminates in the MLS Cup.

In addition to league play, Chivas USA participated in the annual U.S. Open Cup tournament organized by the United States Soccer Federation. During the 2008 season, the club participated in the 2008–09 CONCACAF Champions League, an annual international competition between teams in North America, Central America, and the Caribbean. The club also appeared in the North American SuperLiga, a former competition between MLS and Liga MX teams that ran from 2007 to 2010.

The club played a total of ten seasons in MLS, with 92 wins, 149 losses, and 79 draws over 320 games. The club's 2014 season set a record-low attendance level for the league, with an average of 7,063 fans attending each game. The club ceased operations immediately after the end of the 2014 season. Less than a month later, the team was replaced by expansion team Los Angeles FC.

== Key ==
Key to colors and symbols

1st or W	Winners
2nd or RU	Runners-up
3rd	Third place
Last †	Last place

Key to competitions

- Major League Soccer – The top-flight of soccer in the United States, established in 1996.
- U.S. Open Cup – The premier knockout cup competition in U.S. soccer, first contested in 1914 and open to all registered teams.
- CONCACAF Champions League – The premier club competition in North American soccer since 1962. It was named the Champions' Cup until 2008.
- North American SuperLiga – A club tournament for MLS teams and Liga MX teams held four times from the 2007 season to the 2010 season.

== Seasons ==
Results of Chivas USA league and cup competitions by season
Season	League									Position		Playoffs	USOC	Continental		Average attendance (Note: Average attendance is calculated from league matches only.)	Top goalscorer(s) (Note: Top goalscorer(s) includes all goals scored in the regular season. In years with multiple top goalscorers, they are listed in alphabetical order by last name.)	
Season	Pld	W	L	D	GF	GA	GD	Pts	PPG	Conf.	Overall	Playoffs	USOC	Competition	Result	Average attendance	Name(s)	Goals
2005	32	4	22	6	31	67	–36	18	0.56	6th †	12th †	DNQ	R4	DNQ		17,080	(Mexico) Héctor Cuadros	4
2006	32	10	9	13	45	42	+3	43	1.34	3rd	6th	QF	R3	DNQ		19,840	(United States) Ante Razov	14
2007	30	15	7	8	46	28	+18	53	1.77	1st	2nd	QF	R3	DNQ		14,305	(Cuba) Maykel Galindo	12
2008	30	12	11	7	40	41	–1	43	1.43	2nd	4th	QF	R3	CONCACAF Champions League North American SuperLiga	PR GS	15,114	(United States) Alecko Eskandarian (United States) Sacha Kljestan (United States) Ante Razov	5
2009	30	13	11	6	34	31	+3	45	1.50	4th	6th	QF	R3	North American SuperLiga	GS	15,092	(Mexico) Eduardo Lillingston	8
2010	30	8	18	4	31	45	−14	28	0.93	8th †	15th	DNQ	SF	North American SuperLiga	GS	14,575	(United States) Justin Braun	9
2011	34	8	14	12	41	43	−2	36	1.06	8th	15th	DNQ	QR1	DNQ		14,830	(United States) Justin Braun (United States) Nick LaBrocca	8
2012	34	7	18	9	24	58	−34	30	0.88	9th †	18th	DNQ	SF	DNQ		13,056	(Colombia) Juan Pablo Ángel	4
2013	34	6	20	8	30	67	−37	26	0.76	9th †	18th	DNQ	R4	DNQ		8,366	(Mexico) Erick Torres	7
2014	34	9	19	6	29	61	−32	33	0.97	7th	16th	DNQ	R4	DNQ		7,063	(Mexico) Erick Torres	16
Total	320	92	149	79	351	483	–132	355	1.11	W (1)	RU (1)	QF (4)	SF (2)	–	–	–	(United States) Ante Razov	30
