= 2009 Chivas USA season =

Chivas USA
2009 season
- Owner: Jorge Vergara
- Manager: Preki
- MLS: Conference: 4th Overall: 6th
- MLS Cup Playoffs: Conference Semifinals vs LA Galaxy
- U.S. Open Cup: Third Round vs Charleston Battery
- Top goalscorer: League: Eduardo Lillingston (8); All: Eduardo Lillingston (8)
- Average home league attendance: 15,725
Home colors	Away colors

The 2009 Chivas USA season was the fifth season of the team's existence. It began on March 21 with a 2–1 home win over the Colorado Rapids, and ended with a 3-2 aggregate loss to the Los Angeles Galaxy in the first round of the playoffs.

== Transfers ==
=== In ===
Date	Number	Position	Player	Previous club	Fee/notes	Ref
January 15, 2009	27	MF	(Sierra Leone) Michael Lahoud	Wake Forest Demon Deacons	SuperDraft Round one	
January 15, 2009		FW	(United States) Kyle Christensen	Denver Pioneers	SuperDraft Round three	
January 15, 2009		MF	(United States) Jamie Franks	Wake Forest Demon Deacons	SuperDraft Round four	
January 15, 2009	6	DF	(Canada) Ante Jazić	LA Galaxy	Trade	
March 12, 2009	99	FW	(Mexico) Eduardo Lillingston	(Mexico) Tecos	Undisclosed	
March 19, 2009	8	MF	(Mexico) Mariano Trujillo	(Mexico) Atlante	Undisclosed	
March 27, 2009	23	MF	(Serbia) Bojan Stepanović	(Serbia) Srem	Free	
June 24, 2009	7	MF	(Canada) Kevin Harmse	(Canada) Toronto	Trade	
July 17, 2009	55	MF	(Brazil) Marcelo Saragosa	FC Dallas	Trade	
August 14, 2009	45	DF	(Colombia) Yamith Cuesta	(Colombia) Expreso Rojo	Loan	
August 18, 2009	10	FW	(Mexico) Jesús Padilla	(Mexico) Guadalajara	Loan	
August 21, 2009	29	FW	(Brazil) Maicon	(Brazil) Bonsucesso	Loan	

=== Out ===
Date	Number	Position	Player	New club	Fee/notes	Ref
November 28, 2008	23	DF	(Romania) Alex Zotincă		Waived	
January 13, 2009	20	FW	(Mexico) Roberto Nurse	(Mexico) Veracruz	Free	
January 16, 2009	6	MF	(Mexico) Francisco Mendoza	(Mexico) Guadalajara	Free	
February 10, 2009	31	MF	(United States) Daniel Paladini	Carolina RailHawks	Free	
February 2009	22	MF	(United States) Keith Savage	Portland Timbers	Free	
February 2009	32	FW	(United States) Anthony Hamilton	Ventura County Fusion		
February 2009	37	MF	(United States) Kraig Chiles			
March 3, 2009	8	MF	(Switzerland) Raphaël Wicky		Retired	
July 1, 2009	7	FW	(United States) Alecko Eskandarian	LA Galaxy	Trade	
July 17, 2009	20	FW	(Saint Kitts and Nevis) Atiba Harris	FC Dallas	Trade	
August 2009	25	DF	(United States) Lawson Vaughn	D.C. United	Waived	
September 11, 2009	14	DF	(United States) Bobby Burling	San Jose Earthquakes	Trade	
	9	FW	(United States) Ante Razov			
	29	MF	(Brazil) Dejair			
	39	MF	(United States) Eric Ebert			
		MF	(United States) Jamie Franks	Wilmington Hammerheads		
		FW	(United States) Kyle Christensen			

== Roster ==
No.	Name	Nationality	Position	Date of birth (Age)	Signed from	Signed in	Contract ends	Apps.	Goals
Goalkeepers
1	Dan Kennedy	(United States)	GK	July 22, 1982 (aged 27)	(Chile) Municipal Iquique	2008		10	0
21	Lance Parker	(United States)	GK	August 19, 1985 (aged 24)	Colorado Rapids U-23	2008		5	0
28	Zach Thornton	(United States)	GK	October 10, 1973 (aged 36)	New York Red Bulls	2008		39	0
Defenders
2	Claudio Suárez	(Mexico)	DF	December 17, 1968 (aged 40)	(Mexico) Tigres UANL	2006			
3	Jim Curtin	(United States)	DF	June 23, 1979 (aged 30)	Chicago Fire	2008		25	1
4	Shavar Thomas	(Jamaica)	DF	January 29, 1981 (aged 28)	LA Galaxy	2007		66	0
6	Ante Jazić	(Canada)	DF	February 26, 1976 (aged 33)	LA Galaxy	2009		14	0
12	Carey Talley	(United States)	DF	August 26, 1976 (aged 33)	Real Salt Lake	2008		53	1
13	Jonathan Bornstein	(United States)	DF	November 7, 1984 (aged 25)	UCLA Bruin	2006			
45	Yamith Cuesta	(Colombia)	DF	April 17, 1989 (aged 20)	loan from (Colombia) Expreso Rojo	2009	2010	11	0
Midfielders
5	Paulo Nagamura	(Brazil)	MF	March 2, 1983 (aged 26)	Toronto	2007		83	8
7	Kevin Harmse	(Canada)	MF	July 4, 1984 (aged 25)	Toronto	2009		0	0
8	Mariano Trujillo	(Mexico)	MF	May 19, 1977 (aged 32)	(Mexico) Atlante	2009		21	0
15	Jesse Marsch	(United States)	MF	November 8, 1973 (aged 36)	Chicago Fire	2006			
16	Sacha Kljestan	(United States)	MF	September 9, 1985 (aged 24)	Seton Hall Pirates	2006			
18	Sasha Victorine	(United States)	MF	February 3, 1978 (aged 31)	Kansas City Wizards	2008		15	2
19	Jorge Flores	(United States)	MF	September 16, 1989 (aged 20)	Chivas USA Academy	2007		24	3
23	Bojan Stepanović	(Serbia)	MF	January 11, 1983 (aged 26)	(Serbia) Srem	2009		17	1
24	Gerson Mayen	(United States)	MF	February 9, 1989 (aged 20)	Chivas USA Academy	2008		12	0
27	Michael Lahoud	(Sierra Leone)	MF	September 15, 1986 (aged 23)	Carolina Dynamo	2009		19	1
28	César Zamora	(United States)	MF	May 27, 1991 (aged 18)	Chivas USA Academy	2009		0	0
Forwards
9	Ante Razov	(United States)	FW	March 2, 1974 (aged 35)	New York Red Bulls	2006			
10	Jesús Padilla	(Mexico)	FW	May 3, 1987 (aged 22)	loan from (Mexico) Guadalajara	2009	2010	13	1
11	Maykel Galindo	(Cuba)	FW	January 28, 1981 (aged 28)	Seattle Sounders	2007		65	18
17	Justin Braun	(United States)	FW	March 31, 1987 (aged 22)	Olympique Montreux	2008		45	8
29	Maicon	(Brazil)	FW	April 18, 1984 (aged 25)	loan from (Brazil) Bonsucesso	2009	2010	12	2
77	Chukwudi Chijindu	(United States)	FW	February 20, 1986 (aged 23)	Connecticut Huskies	2009		12	1
99	Eduardo Lillingston	(Mexico)	FW	December 23, 1977 (aged 31)	(Mexico) Tecos	2009		27	8
Left Chivas USA
7	Alecko Eskandarian	(United States)	FW	July 9, 1982 (aged 27)	Real Salt Lake	2008		21	6
14	Bobby Burling	(United States)	DF	November 7, 1984 (aged 25)	LA Galaxy	2007		26	0
20	Atiba Harris	(Saint Kitts and Nevis)	FW	January 9, 1985 (aged 24)	Real Salt Lake	2008		46	5
25	Lawson Vaughn	(United States)	DF	April 11, 1984 (aged 25)	Tulsa Golden	2006			

=== Management ===
Position	Staff
Vice President of Soccer Operations	(United States) Stephen Hamilton
Head Coach	(United States) Preki
Assistant Coach	(United States) Carlos Llamosa
Goalkeeper Coach	(Uruguay) Leo Percovich
Head Athletic trainer	(United States) Josh Beaumont
Assistant Athletic trainer	(United States) Anthony Garcia
Equipment manager	(Mexico) Raúl Guerreroz

Last updated: April 18, 2009
Source: Chivas USA

== North American SuperLiga ==
Team	Pld	W	D	L	GF	GA	GD	Pts
(Mexico) UANL	3	2	0	1	5	5	0	6
(United States) Chicago Fire	3	2	0	1	3	2	1	6
(Mexico) San Luis	3	1	1	1	4	3	1	4
(United States) Chivas USA	3	0	1	2	2	4	−2	1

June 20, 2009 1	Chivas USA (United States)	1–2	(Mexico) UANL	Carson
19:00 PST	Lillingston (yellow card) 29' (yellow-red card) 67'; Lahoud 55'; Stepanović (yellow card) 65'; Nagamura (yellow card) 73'	Report	Pulido 11' (yellow card) 89'; Hernandez (yellow card) 45'; Dueñas 82'	Stadium: The Home Depot Center; Attendance: 11,197; Referee: Wálter Quesada (Costa Rica)

June 23, 2009 2	Chicago Fire (United States)	1–0	(United States) Chivas USA	Bridgeview
17:00 PST	Mapp 35'; Conde (yellow card) 82'	Report	Curtin (yellow card) 82'; Eskandarian (yellow card) 82'	Stadium: Toyota Park; Attendance: 9,126; Referee: Mark Geiger (USA)

June 27, 2009 3	Chivas USA (United States)	1–1	(Mexico) San Luis	Carson
19:00 PST	Galindo (yellow card) 19'; Parker (yellow card) 54'; Stepanović (yellow card) 76'; Harris 89'	Report	Torres (yellow card) 40'; Palacios (yellow card) 42'; Moreno 54' (pen.) (yellow card) 79'	Stadium: The Home Depot Center; Attendance: 7,411; Referee: Luis de la Rosa (Panama)

== Competitions ==
=== MLS ===
==== League table ====
Pos	Team	Pld	W	L	T	GF	GA	GD	Pts	Qualification
1	LA Galaxy	30	12	6	12	36	31	+5	48	MLS Cup Playoffs
2	Houston Dynamo	30	13	8	9	39	29	+10	48	MLS Cup Playoffs
3	Seattle Sounders FC	30	12	7	11	38	29	+9	47	MLS Cup Playoffs
4	Chivas USA	30	13	11	6	34	31	+3	45	MLS Cup Playoffs
5	Real Salt Lake	30	11	12	7	43	35	+8	40	MLS Cup Playoffs
6	Colorado Rapids	30	10	10	10	42	38	+4	40	
7	FC Dallas	30	11	13	6	50	47	+3	39	
8	San Jose Earthquakes	30	7	14	9	36	50	−14	30	

Source: MLS

Pos	Team	Pld	W	L	T	GF	GA	GD	Pts	Qualification
1	Columbus Crew (S)	30	13	7	10	41	31	+10	49	CONCACAF Champions League
2	LA Galaxy	30	12	6	12	36	31	+5	48	CONCACAF Champions League
3	Houston Dynamo	30	13	8	9	39	29	+10	48	North American SuperLiga
4	Seattle Sounders FC	30	12	7	11	38	29	+9	47	CONCACAF Champions League
5	Chicago Fire	30	11	7	12	39	34	+5	45	North American SuperLiga
6	Chivas USA	30	13	11	6	34	31	+3	45	North American SuperLiga
7	New England Revolution	30	11	10	9	33	37	−4	42	North American SuperLiga
8	Real Salt Lake (C)	30	11	12	7	43	35	+8	40	CONCACAF Champions League
9	Colorado Rapids	30	10	10	10	42	38	+4	40	
10	D.C. United	30	9	8	13	43	44	−1	40	
11	FC Dallas	30	11	13	6	50	47	+3	39	
12	Toronto FC	30	10	11	9	37	46	−9	39	CONCACAF Champions League
13	Kansas City Wizards	30	8	13	9	33	42	−9	33	
14	San Jose Earthquakes	30	7	14	9	36	50	−14	30	
15	New York Red Bulls	30	5	19	6	27	47	−20	21	

Source: MLS
Rules for classification: 1) points; 2) head-to-head record; 3) goal difference; 4) number of goals scored
(C) Champions; (S) Supporters' Shield

==== Results summary ====
Overall								Home						Away					
Pld	Pts	W	L	T	GF	GA	GD	W	L	T	GF	GA	GD	W	L	T	GF	GA	GD
30	45	13	11	6	34	31	+3	9	3	3	25	14	+11	4	8	3	9	17	−8

Last updated: October 25, 2009
Source: Major League Soccer
Pld = Matches played; Pts = Points; W = Matches won; T = Matches tied; L = Matches lost; GF = Goals for; GA = Goals against; GD = Goal difference

Round	1	2	3	4	5	6	7	8	9	10	11	12	13	14	15	16	17	18	19	20	21	22	23	24	25	26	27	28	29	30
Stadium	H	A	H	A	H	A	H	A	H	H	A	H	H	A	A	H	A	A	A	H	A	A	H	H	H	A	H	H	A	H
Result	W	W	W	T	W	L	W	W	W	T	T	L	W	L	L	L	L	L	W	W	L	L	W	T	T	W	W	T	L	L

Updated to match(es) played on October 25, 2009. Source: Chivas USA
A = Away; H = Home; W = Win; L = Loss; T = Tie

==== Results ====
March 21, 2009 1	Chivas USA	2–1	Colorado Rapids	Carson
18:30 PST	Harris (yellow card) 51'; Nagamura 55', 59' (yellow card) 61'; Marsch (yellow card) 73'	Report	Cummings 30'; Clark (yellow card) 62'	Stadium: The Home Depot Center; Attendance: 16,453; Referee: Terry Vaughn

March 29, 2009 2	FC Dallas	0–2	Chivas USA	Frisco
12:00 PST	Pitchkolan (yellow card) 68'	Report	Lillingston 56'; Trujillo (yellow card) 70'; Stepanović 75'	Stadium: Pizza Hut Park; Attendance: 6,524; Referee: Paul Ward

April 5, 2009 3	Chivas USA	2–1	Columbus Crew	Carson
17:00 PST	Harris 25'; Lillingston (yellow card) 38' (goal) 50'; Kljestan (yellow card) 67'; Talley (yellow card) 84'	Report	Iro 37' (red card) 67'	Stadium: The Home Depot Center; Attendance: 12,827; Referee: Kevin Stott

April 11, 2009 4	LA Galaxy	0–0	Chivas USA	Carson
19:30 PST	Miglioranzi (yellow card) 19'; Lewis (yellow card) 26'; Gordon (yellow card) 68' (yellow-red card) 71'; Berhalter (red card) 79'	Report	Nagamura (yellow card) 25' (yellow-red card) 44'; Kljestan (yellow card) 33'; Thomas (yellow card) 36'	Stadium: The Home Depot Center; Attendance: 23,317; Referee: Hans-Joachim Weyland

April 18, 2009 5	Chivas USA	2–0	Seattle Sounders FC	Carson
19:30 PST	Lillingston (yellow card) 20'; Riley 32' (o.g.); Chijindu 84'; Trujillo (yellow card) 86'	Report	Scott (yellow card) 45'; Montero (yellow card) 47'	Stadium: The Home Depot Center; Attendance: 15,463; Referee: Alex Prus

April 22, 2009 6	Toronto	1–0	Chivas USA	Toronto
16:30 PST	Guevara 36'; Dichio (yellow card) 38'	Report	Eskandarian (yellow card) 57'; Kljestan (yellow card) 79'	Stadium: BMO Field; Attendance: 19,915; Referee: Ricardo Salazar

April 25, 2009 7	Chivas USA	2–0	FC Dallas	Carson
19:30 PST	Harris (yellow card) 1' (yellow-red card) 89' (goal) 68'; Chijindu (yellow card) 32'; Eskandarian 90+1'	Report	Sala (red card) 25'; Saragosa (yellow card) 60'	Stadium: The Home Depot Center; Attendance: 14,611; Referee: Abbey Okulaja

May 2, 2009 8	San Jose Earthquakes	0–1	Chivas USA	Santa Clara
19:30 PST		Report	Stepanovic (yellow card) 37'; Braun 53'; Marsch (yellow card) 86'; Kljestan (yellow card) 90+2'	Stadium: Buck Shaw Stadium; Attendance: 10,049; Referee: Alex Prus

May 9, 2009 9	Chivas USA	1–0	Real Salt Lake	Carson
19:30 PST	Kljestan (yellow card) 25'; Lillingston (yellow card) 45'; Nagamura 54'; Galindo (yellow card) 66'	Report	Olave (yellow card) 32'; Beckerman (yellow card) 58'	Stadium: The Home Depot Center; Attendance: 13,421; Referee: Ricardo Salazar

May 16, 2009 10	Chivas USA	2–2	D.C. United	Carson
20:00 PST	Galindo 25'; Lillingston 43'; Stepanovic (yellow card) 69'	Report	Simms (yellow card) 36'; Namoff (yellow card) 72'; Emilio 77'; Jakovic (yellow card) 84'; Quaranta 85'	Stadium: The Home Depot Center; Attendance: 16,223; Referee: Mark Geiger

May 23, 2009 11	Kansas City Wizards	1–1	Chivas USA	Kansas City
17:30 PST	López 56'; Wolff (red card) 68'; Jewsbury (yellow card) 70'; Gomez (yellow card) 75'; Hirsig (yellow card) 32' (yellow-red card) 83'	Report	Harris (yellow card) 32'; Lillingston 64'; Trujillo (yellow card) 68'	Stadium: CommunityAmerica Ballpark; Attendance: 10,385; Referee: Jasen Anno

May 28, 2009 12	Chivas USA	2–3	Chicago Fire	Carson
19:30 PST	Nagamura 16' (yellow card) 24'; Galindo 37' (pen.) (yellow card) 41'; Marsch (yellow card) 51' (yellow-red card) 63'; Harris (yellow card) 77'; Trujillo (yellow card) 90+5'; Talley (yellow card) 90+5'	Report	Thorrington (yellow card) 10'; Blanco 25' (pen.), 90+6' (pen.) (yellow card) 54'; Conde (yellow card) 39'; Segares (yellow card) 41'; Nyarko 89'	Stadium: The Home Depot Center; Attendance: 20,379; Referee: Terry Vaughn

June 6, 2009 13	Chivas USA	1–0	Seattle Sounders FC	Carson
19:30 PST	Lillingston (yellow card) 26' (goal) 38'; Trujillo (yellow card) 90'	Report	Ianni (yellow card) 48'; Jaqua (yellow card) 54' (yellow-red card) 88'; Hurtado (yellow card) 81'	Stadium: The Home Depot Center; Attendance: 13,117; Referee: Kevin Stott

June 10, 2009 14	Houston Dynamo	1–0	Chivas USA	Houston
17:30 PST	Holden 45'; Boswell (yellow card) 53'	Report	Talley (yellow card) 39'	Stadium: Robertson Stadium; Attendance: 14,516; Referee: Jorge Gonzalez

June 14, 2009 15	Columbus Crew	2–1	Chivas USA	Columbus
12:00 PST	Carroll (yellow card) 30'; Schelotto 61', 87'	Report	Nagamura (yellow card) 19'; Lillingston 39'; Galindo (yellow card) 57'; Talley (yellow card) 68'	Stadium: Crew Stadium; Attendance: 12,658; Referee: Steven DePiero

July 11, 2009 16	Chivas USA	0–1	LA Galaxy	Carson
20:00 PST		Report	Buddle 30'; Eskandarian (yellow card) 66'	Stadium: The Home Depot Center; Attendance: 23,409; Referee: Ricardo Salazar

July 19, 2009 17	New England Revolution	2–0	Chivas USA	Foxborough
15:00 PST	Dube 61'; Ralston 77'	Report	Nagamura (yellow card) 44'; Lillingston (yellow card) 75'; Lahoud (yellow card) 84'; Talley (yellow card) 92'	Stadium: Gillette Stadium; Attendance: 10,997; Referee: Jeff Gontarek

August 8, 2009 18	Colorado Rapids	4–0	Chivas USA	Commerce City
18:30 PST	Mastroeni 1' (yellow card) 66'; Casey 4', 23', 47+' (pen.)	Report	Marsch (yellow card) 40'; Thomas (red card) 45+1'	Stadium: Dick's Sporting Goods Park; Attendance: 13,364; Referee: Alex Prus

August 15, 2009 19	New York Red Bulls	0–2	Chivas USA	East Rutherford
16:00 PST	Petke (yellow card) 70'	Report	Galindo 15'; Jazic (yellow card) 36'; Kljestan (yellow card) 45+2'; Stepanovic (yellow card) 77'; Lillingston 90+2'	Stadium: Giants Stadium; Attendance: 10,556; Referee: Kevin Stott

August 22, 2009 20	Chivas USA	2–0	Toronto	Carson
19:30 PST	Kljestan 32', 51'	Report	White (yellow card) 25'; Robinson (yellow card) 33'; Serioux (yellow card) 59'	Stadium: The Home Depot Center; Attendance: 15,165; Referee: Hilario Grajeda

August 26, 2009 21	Real Salt Lake	4–0	Chivas USA	Sandy
18:00 PST	Beltran (yellow card) 32'; Campos 43' (yellow card) 45+1'; Johnson (yellow card) 57'; Espindola 75'; Findley 85', 90'	Report	Saragosa (yellow card) 47'; Bornstein (yellow card) 51'	Stadium: Rio Tinto Stadium; Attendance: 14,747; Referee: Terry Vaughn

August 29, 2009 22	LA Galaxy	1–0	Chivas USA	Carson
20:00 PST	Beckham 80'; Klein (yellow card) 90'	Report	Saragosa (yellow card) 23'; Galindo (red card) 82'; Nagamura (yellow card) 90+2'	Stadium: The Home Depot Center; Attendance: 27,000; Referee: Baldomero Toledo

September 13, 2009 23	Chivas USA	2–0	New England Revolution	Carson
12:00 PST	Maicon 10'; Talley (red card) 70'; Kljestan 90+4' (pen.)	Report	Osei (yellow card) 42'; Jankauskas (red card) 70'; Thompson (yellow card) 73'	Stadium: The Home Depot Center; Attendance: 11,334; Referee: Ricardo Salazar

September 19, 2009 24	Seattle Sounders FC	0–0	Chivas USA	Seattle
12:00 PST	Alonso (yellow card) 40'; Marshall (yellow card) 78'; Jaqua (yellow card) 86'	Report	Jazic (yellow card) 34'; Nagamura (yellow card) 43'; Saragosa (red card) 71'; Trujillo (yellow card) 76'; Maicon (yellow card) 77'	Stadium: Qwest Field; Attendance: 32,719; Referee: Terry Vaughn

September 26, 2009 25	Chivas USA	1–1	New York Red Bulls	Carson
19:30 PST	Kljestan 64'	Report	Celades (yellow card) 56'; Angel 84'	Stadium: The Home Depot Center; Attendance: 14,211; Referee: Alex Prus

October 3, 2009 26	D.C. United	0–2	Chivas USA	Washington, D.C.
16:30 PST	Moreno (yellow card) 56'; James (yellow card) 63'; Olsen (red card) 65'; Pontius (yellow card) 84'	Report	Kocic 32' (o.g.); Padilla 53'; Cuesta (yellow card) 65'	Stadium: RFK Stadium; Attendance: 24,175; Referee: Kevin Stott

October 10, 2009 27	Chivas USA	2–0	Kansas City Wizards	Carson
19:30 PST	Braun 72'; Kljestan 74'; Cuesta (yellow card) 78'	Report	Harrington (yellow card) 36'; Arnaud (yellow card) 90'	Stadium: The Home Depot Center; Attendance: 12,923; Referee: Silvia Reyes

October 17, 2009 28	Chivas USA	2–2	San Jose Earthquakes	Carson
19:30 PST	Galindo 7'; Cuesta (yellow card) 36'; Braun 66'; Santos (yellow card) 74'	Report	McDonald 21'; Johnson 58'	Stadium: The Home Depot Center; Attendance: 12,316; Referee: Ricardo Salazar

October 22, 2009 29	Chicago Fire	1–0	Chivas USA	Chicago
17:00 PST	Lillingston 67' (o.g.)	Report	Braun (yellow card) 70'; Cuesta (yellow card) 87'	Stadium: Toyota Park; Attendance: 17,537; Referee: Terry Vaughn

October 25, 2009 30	Chivas USA	2–3	Houston Dynamo	Carson
11:00 PST	Santos (yellow card) 16'; Cuesta (yellow card) 56'; Lahoud 59'; Kljestan (yellow card) 71'; Lillingston 88' (yellow card) 90+4'	Report	Hainault 26'; Oduro 29'; Thompson 52'; Cameron (yellow card) 54'; Robinson (yellow card) 77'	Stadium: The Home Depot Center; Attendance: 14,523; Referee: Mark Geiger

=== MLS Cup Playoffs ===
November 1, 2009 Conference Semifinal 1st leg	Chivas USA	2–2	LA Galaxy	Carson
13:00 PST	Maicon 4'; Galindo 50'; Saragosa (yellow card) 81'	Report	Magee 14'; Birchall (yellow card) 27'; Donovan 41'	Stadium: The Home Depot Center; Attendance: 25,218; Referee: Kevin Stott

November 8, 2009 Conference Semifinal 2nd leg	LA Galaxy	1–0 (3–2 agg.)	Chivas USA	Carson
16:30 PST	Franklin (yellow card) 60'; Donovan 73' (pen.)	Report	Talley (yellow card) 38'; Thornton (yellow card) 72'; Nagamura (yellow card) 78'; Cuesta (yellow card) 78'; Kljestan (yellow card) 90+4'	Stadium: The Home Depot Center; Attendance: 27,000; Referee: Ricardo Salazar

=== U.S. Open Cup ===
June 30, 2009 Third round	Charleston Battery	3–1	Chivas USA	Charleston
16:30 PST	Patterson 9', 45'; Hemming (yellow card) 66'; Wilson (yellow card) 86'; Treschuk (yellow card) 87'; Hudock (yellow card) 89'; Yoshitake 90+'	Report	Marsch 28' (yellow card) 89'; Victorine (yellow card) 43'; Nagamura (yellow card) 54'; Harris (yellow card) 83'; Galindo (yellow card) 86'; Talley (red card) 90'	Stadium: Blackbaud Stadium; Attendance: 3,268; Referee: Mark Kadlecic

== Statistics ==
As of Match played November 8, 2008

=== Appearances and goals ===
No.	Pos	Nat	Player	Total		MLS		Playoffs		U.S. Open Cup	
No.	Pos	Nat	Player	Apps	Goals	Apps	Goals	Apps	Goals	Apps	Goals
2	DF	(Mexico) MEX	Claudio Suárez	5	0	1+4	0	0	0	0	0
3	DF	(United States) USA	Jim Curtin	4	0	2+1	0	0	0	1	0
4	DF	(Jamaica) JAM	Shavar Thomas	18	0	17	0	1	0	0	0
5	MF	(Brazil) BRA	Paulo Nagamura	30	4	25+2	4	2	0	1	0
6	DF	(Canada) CAN	Ante Jazić	14	0	13	0	1	0	0	0
8	MF	(Mexico) MEX	Mariano Trujillo	21	0	18+3	0	0	0	0	0
10	FW	(Mexico) MEX	Jesús Padilla	13	1	10+1	1	1+1	0	0	0
11	FW	(Cuba) CUB	Maykel Galindo	25	5	15+7	4	0+2	1	1	0
12	DF	(United States) USA	Carey Talley	30	0	27	0	2	0	1	0
13	DF	(United States) USA	Jonathan Bornstein	28	0	26	0	2	0	0	0
15	MF	(United States) USA	Jesse Marsch	24	1	21+2	0	0	0	1	1
16	MF	(United States) USA	Sacha Kljestan	27	5	24+1	5	2	0	0	0
17	FW	(United States) USA	Justin Braun	17	3	14+1	3	2	0	0	0
18	MF	(United States) USA	Sasha Victorine	11	0	4+6	0	0	0	1	0
19	MF	(United States) USA	Jorge Flores	10	0	3+4	0	0+2	0	1	0
22	GK	(United States) USA	Zach Thornton	29	0	27	0	2	0	0	0
21	GK	(United States) USA	Lance Parker	5	0	3+1	0	0	0	1	0
23	MF	(Serbia) SRB	Bojan Stepanović	17	1	7+9	1	0	0	1	0
24	MF	(United States) USA	Gerson Mayen	12	0	5+7	0	0	0	0	0
27	MF	(Sierra Leone) SLE	Michael Lahoud	19	1	9+7	1	2	0	0+1	0
29	FW	(Brazil) BRA	Maicon	12	1	8+2	1	2	0	0	0
45	DF	(Colombia) COL	Yamith Cuesta	11	0	9	0	2	0	0	0
55	MF	(Brazil) BRA	Marcelo Saragosa	9	0	7+1	0	1	0	0	0
77	FW	(United States) USA	Chukwudi Chijindu	12	1	4+7	1	0	0	1	0
99	FW	(Mexico) MEX	Eduardo Lillingston	27	8	15+10	8	1	0	1	0
Players away from Chivas USA on loan:
Players who left Chivas USA during the season:
7	FW	(United States) USA	Alecko Eskandarian	7	1	2+5	1	0	0	0	0
14	DF	(United States) USA	Bobby Burling	4	0	1+2	0	0	0	0+1	0
20	FW	(Saint Kitts and Nevis) SKN	Atiba Harris	15	2	13+1	2	0	0	1	0

=== Goal scorers ===
Place	Position	Nation	Number	Name	MLS	MLS Cup Playoffs	U.S. Open Cup	Total
1	FW	(Mexico)	99	Eduardo Lillingston	8	0	0	8
2	MF	(United States)	16	Sacha Kljestan	5	0	0	5
2	FW	(Cuba)	11	Maykel Galindo	4	1	0	5
4	MF	(Brazil)	5	Paulo Nagamura	4	0	0	4
5	FW	(United States)	17	Justin Braun	3	0	0	3
6	FW	(Saint Kitts and Nevis)	20	Atiba Harris	2	0	0	2
6				Own goal	2	0	0	2
6	FW	(Brazil)	29	Maicon	1	1	0	2
9	MF	(Serbia)	23	Bojan Stepanović	1	0	0	1
9	FW	(United States)	77	Chukwudi Chijindu	1	0	0	1
9	FW	(United States)	7	Alecko Eskandarian	1	0	0	1
9	FW	(Mexico)	10	Jesús Padilla	1	0	0	1
9	MF	(Sierra Leone)	27	Michael Lahoud	1	0	0	1
9	MF	(United States)	15	Jesse Marsch	0	0	1	1
				TOTALS	34	2	1	37

=== Disciplinary record ===
Number	Nation	Position	Name	MLS		MLS Cup Playoffs		U.S. Open Cup		Total	
Number	Nation	Position	Name	Booked	Sent off (straight red)	Booked	Sent off (straight red)	Booked	Sent off (straight red)	Booked	Sent off (straight red)
4	(Jamaica)	DF	Shavar Thomas	1	1	0	0	0	0	1	1
5	(Brazil)	MF	Paulo Nagamura	8	1	1	0	1	0	10	1
6	(Canada)	DF	Ante Jazić	2	0	0	0	0	0	2	0
7	(United States)	FW	Alecko Eskandarian	1	0	0	0	0	0	1	0
8	(Mexico)	MF	Mariano Trujillo	5	0	0	0	0	0	5	0
11	(Cuba)	FW	Maykel Galindo	3	1	0	0	1	0	4	1
12	(United States)	DF	Carey Talley	5	1	1	0	0	1	6	2
13	(United States)	DF	Jonathan Bornstein	1	0	0	0	0	0	1	0
15	(United States)	MF	Jesse Marsch	5	1	0	0	1	0	6	1
16	(United States)	MF	Sacha Kljestan	7	0	1	0	0	0	8	0
17	(United States)	FW	Justin Braun	1	0	0	0	0	0	1	0
18	(United States)	MF	Sasha Victorine	0	0	0	0	1	0	1	0
20	(Saint Kitts and Nevis)	FW	Atiba Harris	5	1	0	0	1	0	6	1
22	(United States)	GK	Zach Thornton	0	0	1	0	0	0	1	0
23	(Serbia)	MF	Bojan Stepanović	3	0	0	0	0	0	3	0
27	(Sierra Leone)	MF	Michael Lahoud	1	0	0	0	0	0	1	0
29	(Brazil)	FW	Maicon	3	0	0	0	0	0	3	0
45	(Colombia)	DF	Yamith Cuesta	5	0	1	0	0	0	6	0
55	(Brazil)	MF	Marcelo Saragosa	2	1	1	0	0	0	3	1
77	(United States)	FW	Chukwudi Chijindu	1	0	0	0	0	0	1	0
99	(Mexico)	FW	Eduardo Lillingston	6	0	0	0	0	0	6	0
			TOTALS	65	7	6	0	5	1	76	8
