= 2008 Chivas USA season =

Chivas USA
2008 season
- Owner: Jorge Vergara
- Manager: Preki
- MLS: Conference: 2nd Overall: 5th
- MLS Cup Playoffs: Conference Semifinal vs Real Salt Lake
- U.S. Open Cup: Third round vs Seattle Sounders
- CONCACAF Champions League: Preliminary round vs Tauro
- Top goalscorer: League: Three Players (5); All: Sacha Kljestan (6)
Home colors	Away colors

The 2008 Chivas USA season was the club's fourth season of existence, and their fourth in Major League Soccer, the top flight of American soccer. The club competed in the MLS's Western Conference, where they finished in first place, in their Conference, qualifying for the Playoffs for the second time.

== Transfers ==
=== In ===
Date	Number	Position	Player	Previous club	Fee/notes	Ref
December 20, 2007	24	FW	(Saint Kitts and Nevis) Atiba Harris	Real Salt Lake	Trade	
January 18, 2008	7	FW	(United States) Alecko Eskandarian	Real Salt Lake	Trade	
January 18, 2008	22	MF	(United States) Keith Savage		SuperDraft Round four	
January 22, 2008	3	DF	(United States) Jim Curtin	Chicago Fire	Trade	
January 24, 2008	37	MF	(United States) Kraig Chiles	San Diego State Aztecs	Supplemental Round one	
January 24, 2008		FW	(United States) Javier Ayala-Hill	University of California	Supplemental Round two	
January 24, 2008		MF	(Ivory Coast) El-Hadj Cissé	NC State Wolfpack	Supplemental Round three	
January 24, 2008		DF	(United States) André Sherard	North Carolina Tar Heels	Supplemental Round four	
February 4, 2008	8	MF	(Switzerland) Raphaël Wicky	(Switzerland) Sion	Free Transfer	
March 26, 2008	31	MF	(United States) Daniel Paladini	San Fernando Valley Quakes		
March 27, 2008	34	MF	(United States) Gerson Mayen	Chivas USA U-18	Promoted	
March 2008	17	FW	(United States) Justin Braun	Olympique Montreux		
April 9, 2008	1	GK	(United States) Dan Kennedy	(Chile) Deportes Iquique		
May 9, 2008	12	DF	(United States) Carey Talley	Real Salt Lake	Trade	
July 16, 2008	20	FW	(Mexico) Roberto Nurse	(Mexico) Querétaro		
August 2, 2008	28	GK	(United States) Zach Thornton	New York Red Bulls	Trade	
September 15, 2008	18	MF	(United States) Sasha Victorine	Kansas City Wizards	Trade	
September 2008	29	MF	(Brazil) Dejair	(Brazil) ABC		
	21	GK	(United States) Lance Parker	Colorado Rapids U-23		
	39	MF	(United States) Eric Ebert	Houston Dynamo		

=== Out ===
Date	Number	Position	Player	New club	Fee/notes	Ref
November 21, 2007	21	DF	(United States) Jason Hernandez	San Jose Earthquakes	2007 Expansion Draft	
November 26, 2007	22	GK	(United States) Preston Burpo	San Jose Earthquakes	Trade	
March 28, 2008	12	FW	(England) John Cunliffe	San Jose Earthquakes		
August 1, 2008	18	GK	(United States) Brad Guzan	(England) Aston Villa		
	41	GK	(United States) Justin Myers	Puerto Rico Islanders		
	3	DF	(United States) Carlos Llamosa		Waived	
	5	DF	(United States) Desmond Brooks			
	27	DF	(United States) Eder Robles			
	77	DF	(United States) Orlando Perez		Waived	
	8	MF	(Honduras) Ramón Núñez	(Honduras) Olimpia		
	17	MF	(United States) Rodrigo López	Ventura County Fusion	Waived	
	28	MF	(Mexico) Erasmo Solórzano	Bakersfield Brigade	Waived	
	30	MF	(United States) Carlos Borja	(Mexico) Tapatio		
	31	MF	(United States) Rene Corona	Bakersfield Brigade	Waived	
	33	MF	(United States) Mohammed Sethi			
	10	FW	(France) Laurent Merlin	(Republic of Ireland) St Patrick's Athletic		
	14	FW	(United States) David Arvizu		Waived	

== Roster ==
No.	Name	Nationality	Position	Date of birth (age)	Signed from	Signed in	Contract ends	Apps.	Goals
Goalkeepers
1	Dan Kennedy	(United States)	GK	July 22, 1982 (aged 26)	(Chile) Municipal Iquique	2008		10	0
21	Lance Parker	(United States)	GK	August 19, 1985 (aged 23)	Colorado Rapids U-23	2008		0	0
28	Zach Thornton	(United States)	GK	October 10, 1973 (aged 35)	New York Red Bulls	2008		10	0
Defenders
2	Claudio Suárez	(Mexico)	DF	December 17, 1968 (aged 39)	(Mexico) Tigres UANL	2006			
3	Jim Curtin	(United States)	DF	June 23, 1979 (aged 29)	Chicago Fire	2008		21	1
4	Shavar Thomas	(Jamaica)	DF	January 29, 1981 (aged 27)	LA Galaxy	2007		48	0
12	Carey Talley	(United States)	DF	August 26, 1976 (aged 32)	Real Salt Lake	2008		23	1
13	Jonathan Bornstein	(United States)	DF	November 7, 1984 (aged 24)	UCLA Bruin	2006			
14	Bobby Burling	(United States)	DF	November 7, 1984 (aged 24)	LA Galaxy	2007		22	0
23	Alex Zotincă	(Romania)	DF	January 22, 1977 (aged 31)	Kansas City Wizards	2007		30	0
25	Lawson Vaughn	(United States)	DF	April 11, 1984 (aged 24)	Tulsa Golden	2006			
Midfielders
5	Paulo Nagamura	(Brazil)	MF	March 2, 1983 (aged 25)	Toronto	2007		53	4
6	Francisco Mendoza	(Mexico)	MF	April 29, 1985 (aged 23)	(Mexico) Guadalajara	2005			
8	Raphaël Wicky	(Switzerland)	MF	April 26, 1977 (aged 31)	(Switzerland) Sion	2008		6	0
15	Jesse Marsch	(United States)	MF	November 8, 1973 (aged 35)	Chicago Fire	2006			
16	Sacha Kljestan	(United States)	MF	September 9, 1985 (aged 23)	Seton Hall Pirates	2006			
18	Sasha Victorine	(United States)	MF	February 3, 1978 (aged 30)	Kansas City Wizards	2008		4	2
22	Keith Savage	(United States)	MF	August 9, 1985 (aged 23)	Central Florida Kraze	2008		7	0
29	Dejair	(Brazil)	MF	December 14, 1977 (aged 30)	(Brazil) ABC	2008		4	1
31	Daniel Paladini	(United States)	MF	November 11, 1984 (aged 23)	San Fernando Valley Quakes	2008		9	1
34	Gerson Mayen	(United States)	MF	February 9, 1989 (aged 19)	Chivas USA Academy	2008		0	0
37	Kraig Chiles	(United States)	MF	May 14, 1984 (aged 24)	San Diego State Aztecs	2008		5	0
39	Eric Ebert	(United States)	MF	August 27, 1984 (aged 24)	Houston Dynamo	2008		8	0
Forwards
7	Alecko Eskandarian	(United States)	FW	July 9, 1982 (aged 26)	Real Salt Lake	2008		14	5
9	Ante Razov	(United States)	FW	March 2, 1974 (aged 34)	New York Red Bulls	2006			
11	Maykel Galindo	(Cuba)	FW	January 28, 1981 (aged 27)	Seattle Sounders	2007		40	13
17	Justin Braun	(United States)	FW	March 31, 1987 (aged 21)	Olympique Montreux	2008		28	5
19	Jorge Flores	(United States)	FW	September 16, 1989 (aged 19)	Chivas USA Academy	2007		14	3
20	Roberto Nurse	(Mexico)	FW	December 16, 1983 (aged 24)	(Mexico) Querétaro	2008		7	1
24	Atiba Harris	(Saint Kitts and Nevis)	FW	January 9, 1985 (aged 23)	Real Salt Lake	2008		31	3
32	Anthony Hamilton	(United States)	FW	August 26, 1985 (aged 23)	Orange County Blue Star	2007		10	0
Left Chivas USA
18	Brad Guzan	(United States)	GK	September 9, 1984 (aged 23)	Generation Adidas	2005			
22	Preston Burpo	(United States)	GK	September 26, 1972 (aged 35)	Seattle Sounders	2006			

== North American SuperLiga ==
Team	Pts	Pld	W	D	L	GF	GA	GD
(United States) New England Revolution	7	3	2	1	0	3	1	+2
(Mexico) Pachuca	4	3	1	1	1	3	3	0
(United States) Chivas USA	4	3	1	1	1	3	3	0
(Mexico) Santos Laguna	1	3	0	1	2	1	3	-2

July 13, 2008 1	Chivas USA (United States)	1–2	(Mexico) Pachuca	Carson
19:00 PST	Razov 16'; Bornstein (yellow card) 22'; Mendoza (yellow card) 22'; Nagamura (yellow card) 63'; Curtin (yellow card) 87'; Paladini (yellow card) 89'; Suárez (yellow card) 90+2'	Report	Pinto (yellow card) 8'; Marioni 23'; Caballero 42'	Stadium: The Home Depot Center; Attendance: 14,508; Referee: Carlos Batres (Guatemala)

July 16, 2008 2	Chivas USA (United States)	1–0	(Mexico) Santos Laguna	Carson
19:00 PST	Nagamura (yellow card) 30'; Thomas (yellow card) 70'; Razov 73'; Burling (yellow card) 88'; Flores (yellow card) 90+2'	Report	Ortiz (yellow card) 79'	Stadium: The Home Depot Center; Attendance: 16,343

July 20, 2008 3	Chivas USA (United States)	1–1	(United States) New England Revolution	Fullerton
17:00 PST	Razov 59'	Report	Ralston (yellow card) 16'; Joseph 78'; Thompson (yellow card) 90+3'	Stadium: Titan Stadium; Attendance: 4,738; Referee: Abbey Okulaja

== Competitions ==
=== MLS ===
==== League table ====
Pos	Team	Pld	W	L	T	GF	GA	GD	Pts	Qualification
1	Houston Dynamo	30	13	5	12	45	32	+13	51	MLS Cup Playoffs
2	Chivas USA	30	12	11	7	40	41	−1	43	MLS Cup Playoffs
3	Real Salt Lake	30	10	10	10	40	39	+1	40	MLS Cup Playoffs
4	Colorado Rapids	30	11	14	5	44	45	−1	38	
5	FC Dallas	30	8	10	12	45	41	+4	36	
6	LA Galaxy	30	8	13	9	55	62	−7	33	
7	San Jose Earthquakes	30	8	13	9	32	38	−6	33	

Source: MLS

==== Results summary ====
Overall								Home						Away					
Pld	Pts	W	L	T	GF	GA	GD	W	L	T	GF	GA	GD	W	L	T	GF	GA	GD
0	0	0	0	0	0	0	0	0	0	0	0	0	0	0	0	0	0	0	0

Last updated: October 16, 2007
Source: ESPNSoccernet.com
Pld = Matches played; Pts = Points; W = Matches won; T = Matches tied; L = Matches lost; GF = Goals for; GA = Goals against; GD = Goal difference

==== Results ====
March 30, 2008 1	FC Dallas	1–1	Chivas USA	Dallas
12:00 PST	Toja 21'; Rocha (yellow card) 63'	Report	Nagamura (yellow card) 36'; Galindo (yellow card) 59' (goal) 84'; Thomas (yellow card) 87'	Stadium: Cotton Bowl; Attendance: 17,540; Referee: Mauricio Navarro

April 6, 2008 2	Chivas USA	3–1	Real Salt Lake	Carson
19:30 PST	Kljestan 32'; Harris (yellow card) 45' (goal) 55'; Eskandarian 90+3'	Report	Kovalenko (yellow card) 9'; Deuchar 57'; Espíndola (yellow card) 90+1'	Stadium: The Home Depot Center; Attendance: 17,251

April 12, 2008 3	Columbus Crew	4–3	Chivas USA	Columbus
16:30 PST	Gaven (yellow card) 22'; Schelotto 27' (pen.) (yellow card) 90+3'; Moreno 36'; Moffat (yellow card) 45+4'; Rogers 71', 83'; Padula (yellow card) 75'	Report	Mendoza (yellow card) 14' (yellow-red card) 84'; Kljestan 34' (red card) 84'; Bornstein (yellow card) 38'; Marsch (yellow card) 68' (goal) 73'; Nagamura 78'	Stadium: Crew Stadium; Attendance: 6,733

April 21, 2008 4	Chivas USA	0–2	FC Dallas	Carson
17:00 PST	Galindo (yellow card) 65'	Report	Cooper 5'; Saragosa (yellow card) 51'; Rocha (yellow card) 71'; Thompson 80'; Shea (yellow card) 90+1'	Stadium: The Home Depot Center; Attendance: 10,237

April 27, 2008 5	LA Galaxy	5–2	Chivas USA	Carson
19:30 PST	McDonald (yellow card) 6'; Donovan (yellow card) 8' (goal) 18', 59', 78'; Franchino (yellow card) 45'; Gordon 76', 84'	Report	Kljestan 38'; Razov 63'; Thomas (yellow card) 65'	Stadium: The Home Depot Center; Attendance: 27,000

May 4, 2008 6	Houston Dynamo	0–0	Chivas USA	Houston
17:30 PST	De Rosario (yellow card) 9'; Ianni (yellow card) 13'; Holden (yellow card) 36'; Boswell (yellow card) 52'	Report	Kljestan (yellow card) 13'; Thomas (yellow card) 56'; Galindo (yellow card) 71'; Bornstein (yellow card) 75'; Suárez (red card) 82'	Stadium: Robertson Stadium; Attendance: 20,058; Referee: Jozef Batko

May 11, 2008 7	Chivas USA	1–2	New England Revolution	Carson
12:00 PST	Marsch (yellow card) 19'; Harris (yellow card) 71'; Paladini (yellow card) 76'; Braun 90+3'	Report	Mansally 18'; Larentowicz (yellow card) 30'; Twellman 59'	Stadium: The Home Depot Center; Attendance: 10,927; Referee: Mark Geiger

May 18, 2008 8	Chivas USA	3–1	D.C. United	Carson
19:30 PST	Paladini (yellow card) 41'; Marsch 73'; Kljestan 76'; Flores 82'	Report	Burch (yellow card) 21'; Gallardo 30' (yellow card) 41'; Mediate (yellow card) 48'; Quaranta (yellow card) 89'	Stadium: The Home Depot Center; Attendance: 13,113; Referee: Michael Kennedy

May 25, 2008 9	Colorado Rapids	1–2	Chivas USA	Commerce City
18:30 PST	Clark (yellow card) 28'; Ihemelu (yellow card) 71'; McManus 80'	Report	Marsch (yellow card) 11' (goal) 45'; Flores 79'; Razov (yellow card) 90+2'; Guzan (yellow card) 90+4'	Stadium: Dick's Sporting Goods Park; Attendance: 14,619; Referee: Baldomero Toledo

June 1, 2008 10	Chivas USA	2–0	Columbus Crew	Carson
19:30 PST	Flores 20'; Marsch 21'; Burling (yellow card) 42'; Braun (yellow card) 61'; Harris (yellow card) 82'	Report	O'Rourke (red card) 22'; Moffat (yellow card) 49'	Stadium: The Home Depot Center; Attendance: 12,388; Referee: Fernando Galvan

June 5, 2008 11	New York Red Bulls	1–0	Chivas USA	East Rutherford
16:30 PST	Mike Magee (yellow card) 45'; Ángel 75'	Report	Marsch (yellow card) 30'; Harris (yellow card) 40'; Nagamura (yellow card) 52'	Stadium: Giants Stadium; Attendance: 9,521; Referee: Alex Prus

June 15, 2008 12	Chivas USA	0–1	Real Salt Lake	Carson
19:30 PST	Nagamura (yellow card) 26'; Kljestan (yellow card) 81'	Report	Deuchar (yellow card) 18'; Findley 33'; Olave (yellow card) 76'; Beckerman (yellow card) 89'; Kovalenko (yellow card) 90+3'	Stadium: The Home Depot Center; Attendance: 10,573; Referee: Abbey Okulaja

June 20, 2008 13	Chivas USA	2–0	Chicago Fire	Carson
19:30 PST	Kljestan 26'; Braun 32'; Nagamura (yellow card) 33' (yellow-red card) 45+1'	Report	Thorrington (yellow card) 57'; Blanco (yellow card) 63'; Gutiérrez (yellow card) 89'	Stadium: The Home Depot Center; Attendance: 24,143; Referee: Baldomero Toledo

June 29, 2008 14	Chivas USA	1–1	New York Red Bulls	Carson
19:30 PST	Kljestan (yellow card) 12'; Bornstein (yellow card) 23'; Razov 45+3' (yellow card) 90+1'	Report	van den Bergh 26'; Stammler (yellow card) 51'; Goldthwaite (yellow card) 62'; Sassano (yellow card) 87'	Stadium: The Home Depot Center; Attendance: 16,379; Referee: Mauricio Navarro

July 6, 2008 15	Chivas USA	1–0	San Jose Earthquakes	Carson
19:30 PST	Harris (yellow card) 50'; Razov 88'	Report	Gray (yellow card) 10'; O'Brien (yellow card) 86'	Stadium: The Home Depot Center; Attendance: 13,561; Referee: Terry Vaughn

July 11, 2008 16	LA Galaxy	1–1	Chivas USA	Carson
20:00 PST	Vagenas (yellow card) 6'; Jazić (yellow card) 26'; Buddle 72'; Vanney (yellow card) 79'	Report	Razov 15'; Kljestan (yellow card) 78'	Stadium: The Home Depot Center; Attendance: 27,000; Referee: Kevin Stott

August 3, 2008 17	Chicago Fire	1–0	Chivas USA	Chicago
17:30 PST	Nyarko 16'; Pappa (yellow card) 50'	Report	Nagamura (yellow card) 30'	Stadium: Toyota Park; Attendance: 20,492; Referee: Silviu Petrescu

August 10, 2008 18	Kansas City Wizards	3–2	Chivas USA	Kansas City
17:00 PST	Victorine 22'; Conrad (yellow card) 32'; López 44'; Arnaud 58' (yellow card) 74'; Jewsbury (yellow card) 59'	Report	Curtin (yellow card) 30'; Paladini (yellow card) 53'; Mendoza (yellow card) 62'; Talley 72' (pen.); Braun 82'	Stadium: Arrowhead Stadium; Attendance: 9,597; Referee: Ricardo Salazar

August 15, 2008 19	Chivas USA	2–2	LA Galaxy	Carson
20:00 PST	Harris 50'; Marsch (yellow card) 59'; Nagamura 63' (yellow card) 85'; Talley (yellow card) 90+2'	Report	Donovan 8'; Beckham (yellow card) 61'; Allen (yellow card) 74'; Gordon (yellow card) 90+2'	Stadium: The Home Depot Center; Attendance: 27,000; Referee: Alex Prus

August 21, 2008 20	Houston Dynamo	4–0	Chivas USA	Houston
18:00 PST	Holden 11'; Kamara 22', 35'; Jaqua 28'; Barrett (yellow card) 68'	Report	Suárez (yellow card) 32'; Thomas (yellow card) 39'; Ebert (yellow card) 73'	Stadium: Robertson Stadium; Attendance: 10,908; Referee: Baldomero Toledo

August 24, 2008 21	Chivas USA	0–0	San Jose Earthquakes	Carson
19:30 PST	Thomas (yellow card) 53'	Report	Riley (yellow card) 37'; Hernandez (yellow card) 57'; O'Brien (yellow card) 90+1'	Stadium: The Home Depot Center; Attendance: 13,561; Referee: Terry Vaughn

August 31, 2008 22	Chivas USA	2–1	Toronto	Carson
16:30 PST	Kljestan (yellow card) 15'; Eskandarian 20'; Nagamura (yellow card) 70'; Vaughn (yellow card) 79'; Harris (yellow card) 80' (goal) 90+4'	Report	Brennan 19'; Marshall (yellow card) 72'	Stadium: The Home Depot Center; Attendance: 12,561; Referee: Jorge Gonzalez

September 6, 2008 23	Toronto	1–3	Chivas USA	Toronto
13:00 PST	Rosenlund 30'; Vélez (red card) 45+2'	Report	Paladini (yellow card) 39' (goal) 41'; Eskandarian (red card) 45+2'; Bornstein 58'; Razov 90+5'	Stadium: BMO Field; Attendance: 19,863; Referee: Kevin Scott

September 11, 2008 24	New England Revolution	4–0	Chivas USA	Foxborough
16:00 PST	Twellman 53'; Larentowicz 83'; Smith 90+1'; Ralston 90+3'	Report		Stadium: Gillette Stadium; Attendance: 7,606; Referee: Jair Marrufo

September 21, 2008 25	Real Salt Lake	0–1	Chivas USA	Salt Lake City
18:00 PST	Morales (yellow card) 77'; Olave (yellow card) 78'	Report	Nagamura (yellow card) 61'; Eskandarian 72'; Kljestan (yellow card) 84'	Stadium: Rice-Eccles Stadium; Attendance: 26,391; Referee: Abbey Okulaja

September 28, 2008 26	Chivas USA	2–1	Kansas City Wizards	Carson
19:30 PST	Eskandarian 26'; Kljestan (yellow card) 27'; Harris (yellow card) 35'; Victorine 45+1'; Thomas (yellow card) 86'	Report	Conrad (yellow card) 55'; Wolff 70'	Stadium: The Home Depot Center; Attendance: 14,783; Referee: Michael Kennedy

October 4, 2008 27	D.C. United	0–3	Chivas USA	Washington, D.C.
16:30 PST	Peralta (yellow card) 66'	Report	Eskandarian 35'; Thomas (yellow card) 38'; Victorine 56'; Dejair 68'	Stadium: RFK Stadium; Attendance: 28,145; Referee: Kevin Stott

October 12, 2008 28	San Jose Earthquakes	0–1	Chivas USA	Santa Clara
19:00 PST	Kirovski (yellow card) 78'; Lima (yellow card) 81'	Report	Braun 7'; Harris (yellow card) 70'; Eskandarian (yellow card) 80'; Kennedy (yellow card) 90+1'	Stadium: Buck Shaw Stadium; Attendance: 10,502; Referee: Jorge Gonzalez

October 19, 2008 29	Chivas USA	1–2	Colorado Rapids	Carson
12:00 PST	Burling (yellow card) 16'; Braun (yellow card) 35'; Bornstein 72'; Talley (yellow card) 90+3'	Report	McManus (yellow card) 35'; Harvey (yellow card) 40'; Clark 67'; Casey 85' (pen.)	Stadium: The Home Depot Center; Attendance: 13,427; Referee: Baldomero Toledo

October 26, 2008 30	Chivas USA	1–1	Houston Dynamo	Carson
18:30 PST	Kennedy (red card) 50'; Curtin 90'	Report	Ching (yellow card) 14'; De Rosario 52' (pen.)	Stadium: The Home Depot Center; Attendance: 18,165; Referee: Terry Vaughn

=== MLS Cup Playoffs ===
November 1, 2008 Conference Semifinal 1st leg	Real Salt Lake	1–0	Chivas USA	Sandy
15:00 PST	Williams (yellow card) 29'; Beckerman (yellow card) 42'; Movsisyan 90'	Report	Razov (yellow card) 66'; Thomas (yellow card) 75'	Stadium: Rio Tinto Stadium; Attendance: 14,719; Referee: Ricardo Salazar

November 8, 2008 Conference Semifinal 2nd leg	Chivas USA	2–2 (2–3 agg.)	Real Salt Lake	Carson
19:30 PST	Nagamura (yellow card) 22'; Kljestan 30' (pen.); Bornstein (yellow card) 60'; Braun 83'; Razov (yellow card) 86'; Thomas (yellow card) 90+1'	Report	Mathis (yellow card) 10'; Borchers (yellow card) 30'; Kovalenko 39' (yellow card) 42'; Morales 77'	Stadium: The Home Depot Center; Attendance: 19,256; Referee: Michael Kennedy

=== CONCACAF Champions League ===
August 26, 2008 Preliminary round 1st leg	Tauro (Panama)	2–0	(United States) Chivas USA	Panama City, Panama
17:00 PST	Aguilar 5', 65'; Arosemena (yellow card) 62'	Report	Talley (yellow card) 48'; Wicky (yellow card) 65'	Stadium: Estadio Nacional de Panamá; Attendance: 500; Referee: Elmar Rodas (Guatemala)

September 2, 2008 Preliminary round 2nd leg	Chivas USA (United States)	1–1 (1–3 agg.)	(Panama) Tauro	Carson, California, United States
19:00 PST	Bornstein (yellow card) 37' (yellow-red card) 51'; Nurse 42'; Kljestan (yellow card) 53'	Report	W.Dominguez (yellow card) 19'; R.Amador (yellow card) 60'; Moreno 62'	Stadium: The Home Depot Center; Attendance: 1,821; Referee: Mauricio Navarro (Canada)

=== U.S. Open Cup ===
July 1, 2008 Third round	Seattle Sounders	2–0	Chivas USA	Seattle
10:00 PST	Graham 43'; Schmid (yellow card) 64'; Le Toux 80'; O'Brien (yellow card) 81'	Report	Kljestan (yellow card) 69'	Stadium: Starfire Sports Complex; Attendance: 2,997; Referee: Yader Reyes

== Statistics ==
=== Appearances and goals ===
As of Match played November 7, 2008

No.	Pos	Nat	Player	Total		MLS		Playoffs		U.S. Open Cup		Champions League	
No.	Pos	Nat	Player	Apps	Goals	Apps	Goals	Apps	Goals	Apps	Goals	Apps	Goals
1	GK	(United States) USA	Dan Kennedy	10	0	8+1	0	0	0	0	0	1	0
2	DF	(Mexico) MEX	Claudio Suárez	15	0	13+1	0	0	0	0	0	1	0
3	DF	(United States) USA	Jim Curtin	21	1	15+3	1	1	0	1	0	1	0
4	DF	(Jamaica) JAM	Shavar Thomas	23	0	18+1	0	2	0	1	0	1	0
5	MF	(Brazil) BRA	Paulo Nagamura	29	2	24	2	2	0	1	0	2	0
6	MF	(Mexico) MEX	Francisco Mendoza	33	0	28	0	2	0	0+1	0	2	0
7	FW	(United States) USA	Alecko Eskandarian	14	5	8+3	5	0+1	0	0	0	0+2	0
8	MF	(Switzerland) SUI	Raphaël Wicky	6	0	1+4	0	0	0	0	0	1	0
9	FW	(United States) USA	Ante Razov	26	5	17+5	5	2	0	0	0	1+1	0
11	FW	(Cuba) CUB	Maykel Galindo	10	1	5+5	1	0	0	0	0	0	0
12	DF	(United States) USA	Carey Talley	23	1	18+2	1	2	0	0	0	1	0
13	DF	(United States) USA	Jonathan Bornstein	26	2	19+2	2	2	0	1	0	2	0
14	DF	(United States) USA	Bobby Burling	22	0	18+2	0	0+1	0	0	0	1	0
15	MF	(United States) USA	Jesse Marsch	28	4	24+1	4	2	0	0+1	0	0	0
16	MF	(United States) USA	Sacha Kljestan	27	6	21+1	5	2	1	1	0	2	0
17	FW	(United States) USA	Justin Braun	28	5	12+12	4	1+1	1	1	0	1	0
18	MF	(United States) USA	Sasha Victorine	4	2	4	2	0	0	0	0	0	0
19	FW	(United States) USA	Jorge Flores	13	3	6+5	3	0	0	1	0	0+1	0
20	FW	(Mexico) MEX	Roberto Nurse	7	1	2+3	0	0+1	0	0	0	1	1
22	MF	(United States) USA	Keith Savage	7	0	3+3	0	0	0	0+1	0	0	0
23	DF	(Romania) ROU	Alex Zotincă	6	0	4	0	1+1	0	0	0	0	0
24	FW	(Saint Kitts and Nevis) SKN	Atiba Harris	31	3	23+5	3	1	0	1	0	1	0
25	DF	(United States) USA	Lawson Vaughn	8	0	7	0	0	0	0	0	0+1	0
28	GK	(United States) USA	Zach Thornton	10	0	7+1	0	2	0	0	0	0	0
29	MF	(Brazil) BRA	Dejair	4	1	1+2	1	0+1	0	0	0	0	0
31	MF	(United States) USA	Daniel Paladini	9	1	5+3	1	0	0	1	0	0	0
32	FW	(United States) USA	Anthony Hamilton	6	0	0+5	0	0	0	0+1	0	0	0
37	MF	(United States) USA	Kraig Chiles	6	0	2+3	0	0	0	1	0	0	0
39	MF	(United States) USA	Eric Ebert	8	0	2+5	0	0	0	0	0	1	0
Players away from Chivas USA on loan:
Players who left Chivas USA during the season:
14	FW	(United States) USA	David Arvizu	1	0	0	0	0	0	0	0	1	0
18	GK	(United States) USA	Brad Guzan	16	0	15	0	0	0	1	0	0	0
	GK	(United States) USA	Preston Burpo	1	0	0	0	0	0	0	0	1	0

=== Goal scorers ===
Place	Position	Nation	Number	Name	MLS	MLS Cup Playoffs	U.S. Open Cup	Champions League	Total
1	MF	(United States)	16	Sacha Kljestan	5	1	0	0	6
2	FW	(United States)	9	Ante Razov	5	0	0	0	5
2	FW	(United States)	7	Alecko Eskandarian	5	0	0	0	5
2	FW	(United States)	17	Justin Braun	4	1	0	0	5
5	MF	(United States)	15	Jesse Marsch	4	0	0	0	4
6	FW	(Saint Kitts and Nevis)	24	Atiba Harris	3	0	0	0	3
6	FW	(United States)	19	Jorge Flores	3	0	0	0	3
8	DF	(United States)	13	Jonathan Bornstein	2	0	0	0	2
8	MF	(United States)	18	Sasha Victorine	2	0	0	0	2
8	MF	(Brazil)	5	Paulo Nagamura	2	0	0	0	2
11	MF	(Brazil)	29	Dejair	1	0	0	0	1
11	DF	(United States)	3	Jim Curtin	1	0	0	0	1
11	FW	(Cuba)	11	Maykel Galindo	1	0	0	0	1
11	DF	(United States)	12	Carey Talley	1	0	0	0	1
11	MF	(United States)	31	Daniel Paladini	1	0	0	0	1
11	FW	(Mexico)	20	Roberto Nurse	0	0	0	1	1
				TOTALS	40	2	0	1	43

=== Disciplinary record ===
Number	Nation	Position	Name	MLS		MLS Cup Playoffs		U.S. Open Cup		Champions League		Total	
Number	Nation	Position	Name	Booked	Sent off (straight red)	Booked	Sent off (straight red)	Booked	Sent off (straight red)	Booked	Sent off (straight red)	Booked	Sent off (straight red)
1	(United States)	GK	Dan Kennedy	1	1	0	0	0	0	0	0	0	1
2	(Mexico)	DF	Claudio Suárez	1	1	0	0	0	0	0	0	1	1
3	(United States)	DF	Jim Curtin	1	0	0	0	0	0	0	0	1	0
4	(Jamaica)	DF	Shavar Thomas	7	0	2	0	0	0	0	0	9	0
5	(Brazil)	MF	Paulo Nagamura	9	1	1	0	0	0	0	0	10	1
6	(Mexico)	MF	Francisco Mendoza	3	1	0	0	0	0	0	0	3	1
7	(United States)	FW	Alecko Eskandarian	1	1	0	0	0	0	0	0	1	1
8	(Switzerland)	MF	Raphaël Wicky	0	0	0	0	0	0	1	0	1	0
9	(United States)	FW	Ante Razov	2	0	2	0	0	0	0	0	4	0
11	(Cuba)	FW	Maykel Galindo	3	0	0	0	0	0	0	0	3	0
12	(United States)	DF	Carey Talley	2	0	0	0	0	0	1	0	3	0
13	(United States)	DF	Jonathan Bornstein	3	0	1	0	0	0	2	1	6	1
14	(United States)	DF	Bobby Burling	2	0	0	0	0	0	0	0	2	0
15	(United States)	MF	Jesse Marsch	5	0	0	0	0	0	0	0	5	0
16	(United States)	MF	Sacha Kljestan	7	1	0	0	1	0	1	0	9	1
17	(United States)	FW	Justin Braun	2	0	0	0	0	0	0	0	2	0
18	(United States)	GK	Brad Guzan	1	0	0	0	0	0	0	0	1	0
24	(Saint Kitts and Nevis)	FW	Atiba Harris	8	0	0	0	0	0	0	0	8	0
25	(United States)	DF	Lawson Vaughn	1	0	0	0	0	0	0	0	1	0
31	(United States)	MF	Daniel Paladini	4	0	0	0	0	0	0	0	4	0
39	(United States)	MF	Eric Ebert	1	0	0	0	0	0	0	0	1	0
			TOTALS	64	6	6	0	1	0	5	1	76	7
