= Bojan Stepanović =

Serbian footballer

Personal information
- Full name: Bojan Stepanović
- Date of birth: January 11, 1983 (age 43)
- Place of birth: Belgrade, Yugoslavia
- Height: 5 ft 9 in (1.75 m)
- Position: Central midfielder

Youth career
- Radnički Beograd

Senior career*
Years	Team	Apps	(Gls)
2001–2005	Radnički Beograd	84	(16)
2005–2006	Voždovac	15	(3)
2006–2007	Mladenovac	31	(2)
2007–2009	Srem	42	(6)
2009	Chivas USA	17	(1)
2010	Drava Ptuj	6	(1)
2010–2011	Posavac	6	(0)
2012–2013	Timok	10	(1)
2014–2015	Burlington SC		
2016–2019	Brantford Galaxy	21	(5)
- * Club domestic league appearances and goals as of 31 February 2017

Bojan Stepanović (Serbian Cyrillic: Бојан Степановић; born January 11, 1983) is a Serbian footballer who played as a midfielder.

== Career ==
=== Europe ===
Born in Belgrade, in the Yugoslavia prior to the country's breakup in the Yugoslav wars, Stepanović spent his early career playing in his native Serbia. He was a member of the youth setup at Radnički Beograd, and played for Radnički's first team in the First League of Serbia and Montenegro in 2004. He later went on to play for Voždovac in the 2005–06 Serbia and Montenegro SuperLiga, and for Srem in the Serbian First League (Serbian second tier) from 2007 to 2009.

=== North America ===
Stepanović was signed by Chivas USA on March 27, 2009, after impressing head coach Preki during a month-long trial, in which he played in several pre-season friendlies. He made his Major League Soccer debut on March 29, 2009, coming on as a 69th-minute substitute in a 2-0 away win over FC Dallas. He scored six minutes into his debut appearance.

Stepanović was waived by Chivas USA on January 26, 2010. In 2014, he signed with Burlington SC of the Canadian Soccer League, where he played for two seasons. In 2016, he remained in the CSL and signed with Brantford Galaxy, where he appeared in 21 matches with 5 goals.
