= Jamie Lee Darley =

American model

- Born: June 12, 1986 (age 40); Shoreham-by-Sea, England
- Occupation: model
- Years active: 2009-present
- Spouse: Sacha Kljestan

Jamie Lee Darley (born Shoreham-by-Sea, England, June 12, 1986) is an American model known for competing in the 2009 Victoria's Secret Fashion Show Model Search.

== Career ==
In 2009, Darley took part in Victoria's Secret Fashion Show Model Search to find a new "runway Angel" and placed second, losing out to Kylie Bisutti. During the competition, she posed for a lingerie shoot with the brand, took part in the Angels' media tour, and although omitted from the final broadcast, walked the runway during the show's first taping.

She has also appeared as a background character on the HBO show Entourage as a limo driver for the character Turtle. She shot for Affliction's spring 2010 campaign alongside Dominic Purcell. She appeared in a Carl's Jr commercial. She made her editorial debut in the March issue of Elle Belgium.

She is signed to Elite Model Management.

== Personal life ==
Darley was born in Shoreham, England. She immigrated to America with her family at a young age. She attended the University of California, Santa Barbara where she played volleyball for the UC Santa Barbara Gauchos women's volleyball team.

Darley is married to American soccer player Sacha Kljestan.
