= Sacha Kljestan =

American soccer player (born 1985)

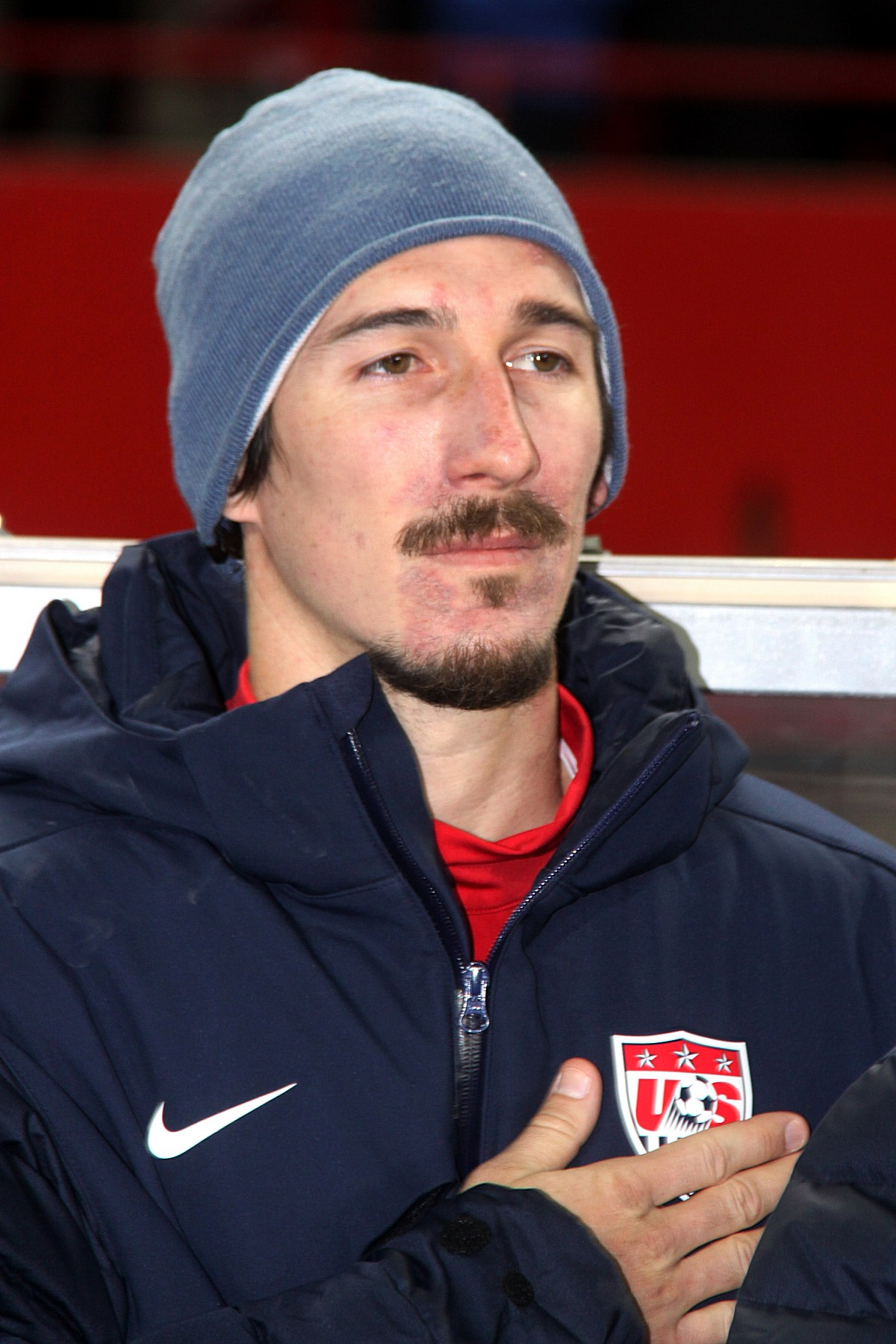
- Kljestan with the United States in 2013

Personal information
- Full name: Sacha Bryan Kljestan
- Date of birth: September 9, 1985 (age 41)
- Place of birth: Huntington Beach, California, United States
- Height: 6 ft 1 in (1.85 m)
- Position: Midfielder

College career
Years	Team	Apps	(Gls)
2003–2005	Seton Hall Pirates	61	(20)

Senior career*
Years	Team	Apps	(Gls)
2005	Orange County Blue Star	2	(1)
2006–2010	Chivas USA	114	(15)
2010–2015	Anderlecht	132	(18)
2015–2017	New York Red Bulls	97	(16)
2018–2019	Orlando City	53	(7)
2020–2022	LA Galaxy	67	(6)
2024–2025	Des Moines Menace	0	(0)
Total		466	(63)

International career
2004–2005	United States U20	16	(1)
2007–2008	United States U23	16	(3)
2007–2017	United States	52	(6)
Medal record
Representing United States
FIFA Confederations Cup
Runner-up	2009 South Africa	Team
CONCACAF Gold Cup
Runner-up	CONCACAF Gold Cup	2011
Men's Soccer
- * Club domestic league appearances and goals

Sacha Bryan Kljestan (/ˈsɑːʃə ˈklɛʃtən/; born September 9, 1985) is an American former professional soccer player who played as a midfielder. He currently is a studio host on MLS Season Pass.

== Youth and college ==
Kljestan was raised in Huntington Beach, California, and played for the Region IV Olympic Development Program team. He played three years of college soccer at Seton Hall University in New Jersey under former United States national team coach Manfred Schellscheidt. He was named NCAA Division I First-Team All-America in 2004 and earned third-team honors in 2005. Kljestan was named Big East Conference Offensive Player of the Year in 2005 and earned first-team All-Big East in 2004 and 2005. He holds the single-season assists record at Seton Hall with 15 in 2005 and ranks fifth all-time at the school with 28 over a three-year career. Kljestan finished his college career with 20 goals and helped Seton Hall University to three NCAA Tournament appearances.

== Club career ==
Kljestan signed a Generation adidas contract with MLS, and played USL Premier Development League soccer for Orange County Blue Star in 2005. Kljestan was taken fifth overall at the 2006 MLS SuperDraft.

=== Chivas USA ===
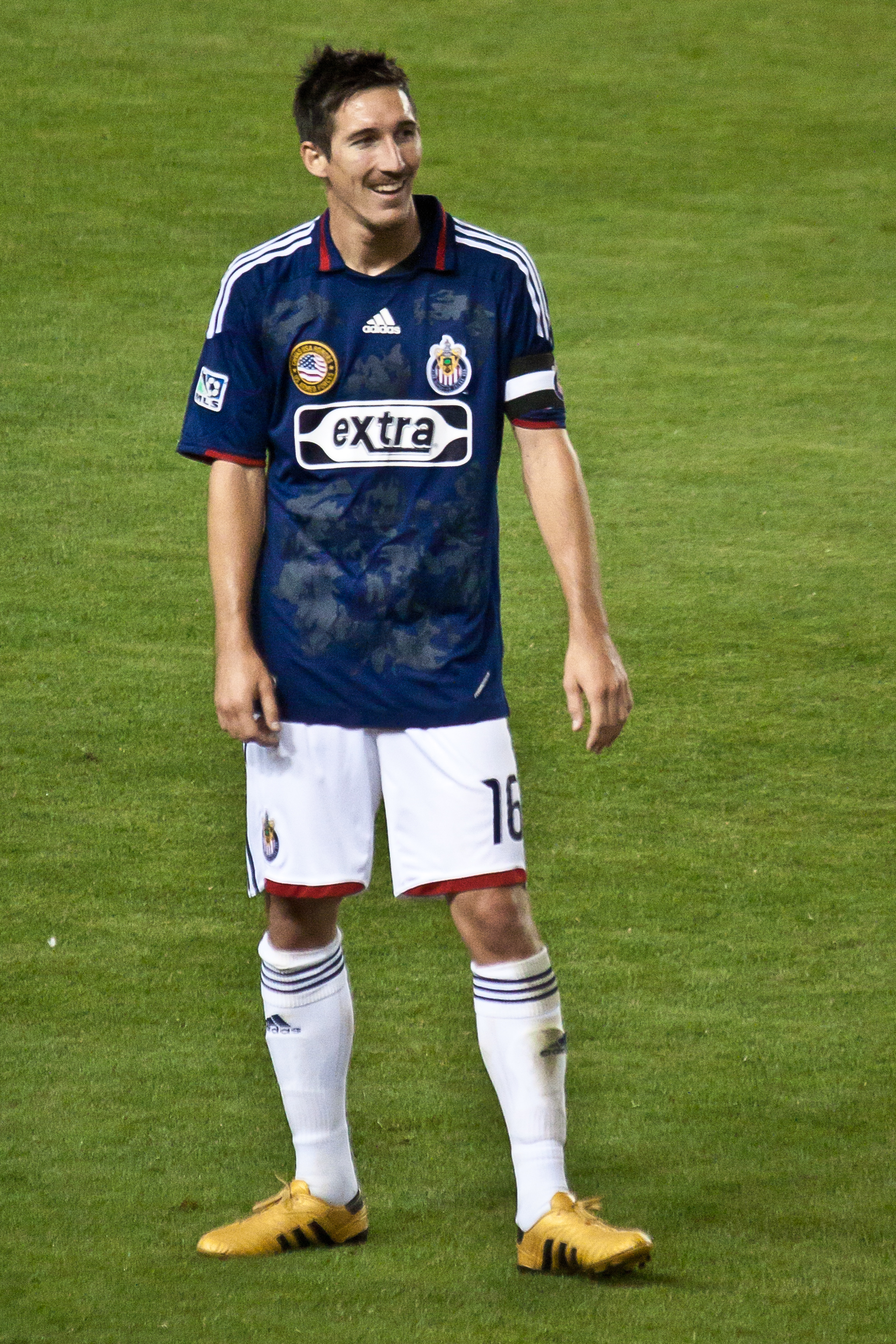
Kljestan playing for Chivas USA in 2010

Kljestan was a finalist for 2006 MLS Rookie of the Year as he appeared in 32 league matches for Chivas and recorded seven assists. He improved his performance in his second year as he recorded four goals and provided 13 assists in 25 matches, helping Chivas to a first-place finish in the Western Conference. He was nominated for the Starting XI in the 2008 MLS All-Star Game, but chose instead to play for the U.S. Olympic Team in the 2008 Beijing Olympics. His performance for club and country drew attention from many clubs overseas, and he left the U.S. team's winter training camp in mid-January 2009 to go on trial beginning January 17 at Celtic, the Scottish Premier League reigning champions. After the trial he returned to Chivas and continued his fine form as he made 25 league appearances during the 2009 season and scored 5 goals and provided three assists. He began the 2010 season with Chivas before being transferred to top Belgian side Anderlecht. In his time with Chivas, Klejstan finished with fifteen goals and 33 assists in 114 league matches.

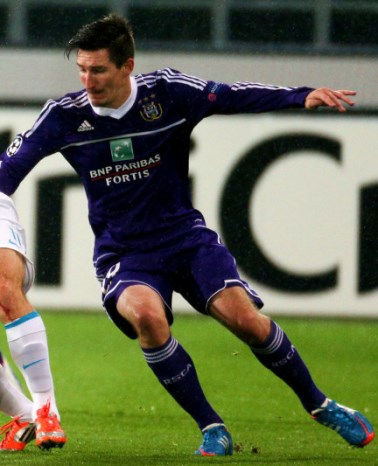
Kljestan against Zenit.

=== Anderlecht ===
In June 2010, Kljestan signed a four-year contract with 2009–10 Belgian Pro League champions Anderlecht. He made his competitive debut and scored his first goal in the same game on July 27, 2010, in a 3–1 win over Welsh club The New Saints in the third qualifying round of the 2010–11 UEFA Champions League. In his first season in Belgium he appeared in 34 matches across all competitions scoring three goals and helped Anderlecht capture the 2010 Belgian Super Cup. While at Anderlecht, Kljestan was converted from his traditional number 10 role to a holding midfielder; where he partnered with Argentine Lucas Biglia. Together the two formed a strong partnership which lead Kljestan to his first-ever title, winning the Belgian Pro League in 2012. He quickly became a fan favorite as supporters began to call him "Mr. USA" and bring US flags to the stadium to show praise for the team's only American player. The following three seasons he remained a key player as Anderlecht captured three consecutive Belgian Pro League and Belgian Super Cup titles.

In March 2013, Kljestan signed a new three-year contract with Anderlecht. In a Champions League group stage match against Paris Saint-Germain, Kljestan and Zlatan Ibrahimović traded insults, when Ibrahimović made fun of Kljestan's mustache. In response, Kljestan made fun of Ibrahaimović's large nose. Kljestan was ultimately sent off in the later stages of the match. In the final game of the group against Olympiacos; Kljestan became only the fifth American to score in a Champions League match.

During the 2013–14 campaign, Kljestan scored a career-high nine goals as he appeared in 30 matches. Although he had one of his best statistical seasons, he slowly lost his regular spot in the lineup and became a bench player during the final weeks of the season. Kljestan was honored with a pre-match ceremony in his final match with the club on February 1, 2015, against Zulte Waregem. The supporters held up United States flags and banners thanking him for his years with the club. He made a total of 180 appearances for the club, scoring 25 goals, before leaving the club in the winter of 2015.

=== New York Red Bulls ===
In January 2015, it was announced that Anderlecht had agreed to transfer Kljestan to New York Red Bulls in Major League Soccer. He made his debut for New York on March 8, 2015, appearing as a starter in a 1–1 draw at Sporting Kansas City. On April 17, 2015, he scored his first goal for New York in a 2–0 victory over the San Jose Earthquakes. On July 1, 2015, he helped the Red Bulls advance in the U.S. Open Cup, scoring one goal and assisting on another in a 4–1 victory over local rival New York Cosmos. On August 1, 2015, he scored the opening goal for New York on a penalty kick and assisted on another helping New York to a 3–1 away victory over Philadelphia Union. On October 7, 2015, he scored on another penalty kick to help the Red Bulls to a 2–1 victory over Montreal Impact. On October 25, 2015, he scored the eventual game-winning goal for New York in 2–1 victory over Chicago Fire, helping Red Bulls clinch the 2015 MLS Supporters' Shield. His 14 league assists tied a club record with Thierry Henry and Eduardo Hurtado for the most assists in an MLS season.

On March 19, 2016, Kljestan scored his first goal of the season in helping New York to a 4–3 victory over Houston Dynamo. On April 29, 2016, Kljestan helped New York to a 4–0 victory against FC Dallas scoring one goal and assisting on another. During the third Hudson River Derby match of the season; Kljestan converted a penalty and provided two assists en route to a 4–1 victory. On August 3, Kljestan scored the third goal in a 3–0 victory against Antigua GFC in the Red Bulls' first 2016–17 CONCACAF Champions League group stage match. Kljestan recorded his 15th league assist in a 2–2 draw against D.C. United on August 21; breaking Thierry Henry's record of 14 from the 2014 season. With his 20th assist in the regular season finale, Kljestan joined Carlos Valderrama as the only two players to reach the 20 assist mark in a single MLS season.

On February 15, 2017, he was named as the new captain of the Red Bulls replacing Dax McCarty. On July 19, 2017, Kljestan scored his first league goal of the season and recorded two assists for New York in a 5–1 victory over San Jose Earthquakes.

=== Orlando City ===
On January 3, 2018, New York Red Bulls traded Kljestan to Orlando City SC, along with $150,000 of Targeted Allocation Money, in exchange for Carlos Rivas and Tommy Redding. He was suspended for the first two games of the season owing to the confrontation with Jozy Altidore and resultant red card he picked up playing for Red Bulls in the 2017 Eastern Conference Playoff Semi-finals second-leg. He made his Orlando debut in a 2–0 away defeat to New York City FC on March 17. On April 8, Kljestan scored his first goal for the club, a game-tying penalty in a 3–2 win over Portland Timbers. He acted as captain for the majority of his debut season in the absence of Jonathan Spector. Kljestan's contract expired at the end of the 2019 season.

=== LA Galaxy ===
On December 11, 2019, Kljestan signed as a free agent for LA Galaxy ahead of their 2020 season. On December 15, 2021, Kljestan signed a one-year contract extension with LA Galaxy through the 2022 season, continuing his role as an experienced midfielder in Major League Soccer Kljestan formally announced his retirement on January 5, 2023.

=== Des Moines Menace ===
On March 17, 2024, Kljestan signed with USL League Two club Des Moines Menace ahead of the team's first 2024 U.S. Open Cup match. Menace general manager Charlie Bales and Kljestan had met in January 2024 at a cycling class in Southern California. Kljestan returned for the team's 2025 U.S. Open Cup run, scoring both goals in the team's 2–1 victory over Sporting Kansas City II. The team would go on to lose 2–1 to Union Omaha in the second round of the cup. Kljestan would receive a red card while on the bench in the 69th minute.

== International career ==
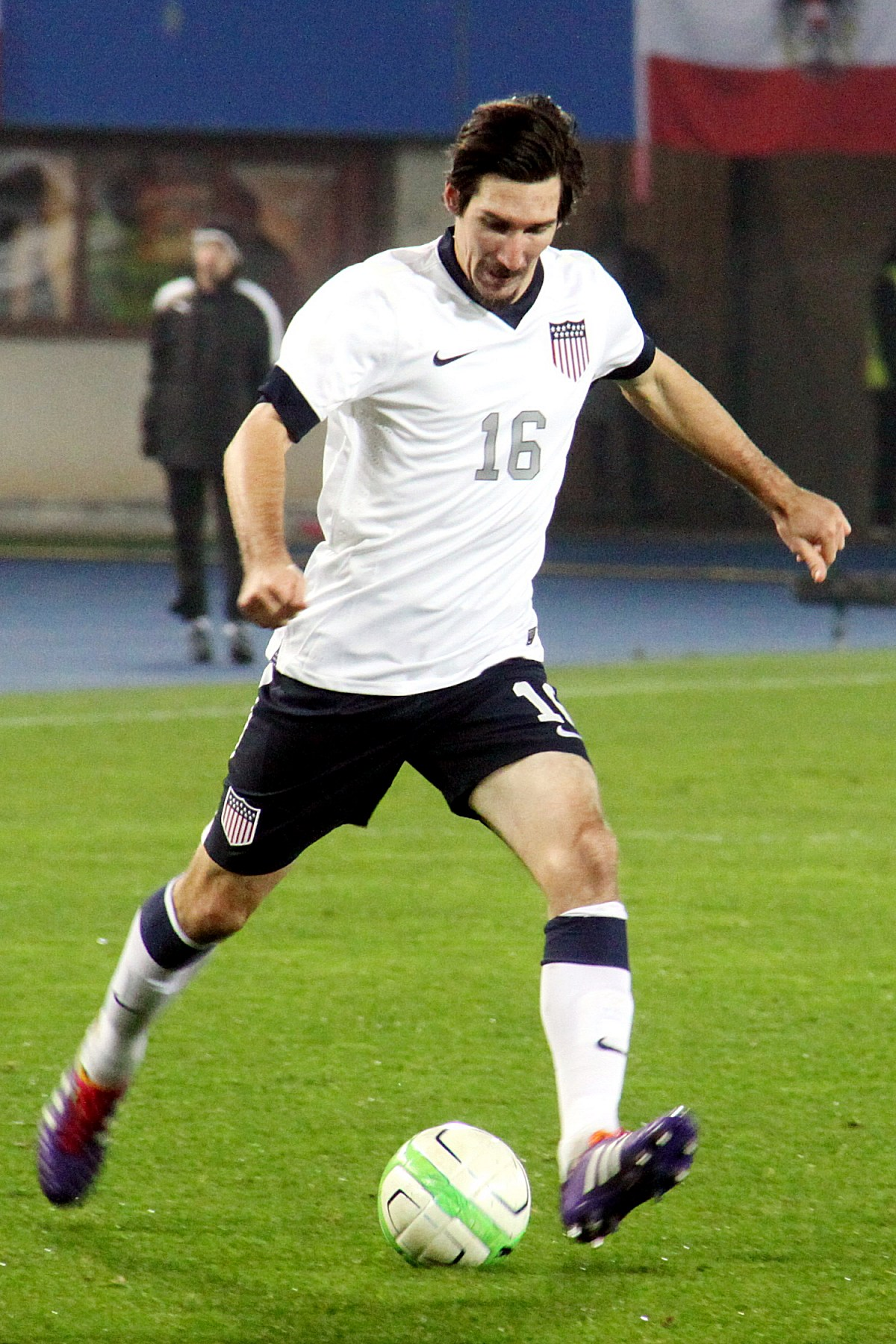
Kljestan playing for the United States in 2013

=== U20 ===
Kljestan was part of the United States Under-20 team at the 2005 FIFA World Youth Championship. He had entered the U-20 program in 2004, earning a total of 16 caps, scoring 1 goal with the team up to 2005. In early 2007, he was called into training camp with the senior U.S. national team, but did not earn a cap in the following games.

=== U23 ===
He also played for the US Under-23s at the 2008 CONCACAF Men's Pre-Olympic Tournament and scored in a 3–0 win against Canada to send the US Under-23s through to the Olympics. Kljestan was selected to Peter Nowak's roster for the U-23 Olympics in Beijing. He started all three games and finished the tournament as the United States' highest goal scorer with 2, an equalizer against the Netherlands in the 2–2 draw, which was voted goal Best U.S. Men's Soccer goal of 2008, and a penalty against Nigeria in the 2–1 loss that knocked them out of the tournament.

=== Men's team ===
Kljestan made his debut for the senior national team under his former club coach Bob Bradley on June 2, 2007, tallying an assist on Benny Feilhaber's winning goal in a 4–1 friendly match victory over China in San Jose. Later that summer Kljestan was a member of the US squad that participated in Copa América 2007. He made regular appearances as a central midfielder and contributed three assists in qualification for the 2010 FIFA World Cup. Kljestan scored a hat trick in a 3–2 friendly victory over Sweden on January 24, 2009, his first three goals with the senior team. Although he made the preliminary 30-man squad he was not picked for the final 23-man roster for the 2010 World Cup.

After the hiring of Jürgen Klinsmann as national team manager in 2011, Kljestan was selected less often for the national team despite his consistent play with Anderlecht and the Red Bulls. He was not selected in the US squad for the 2014 FIFA World Cup.

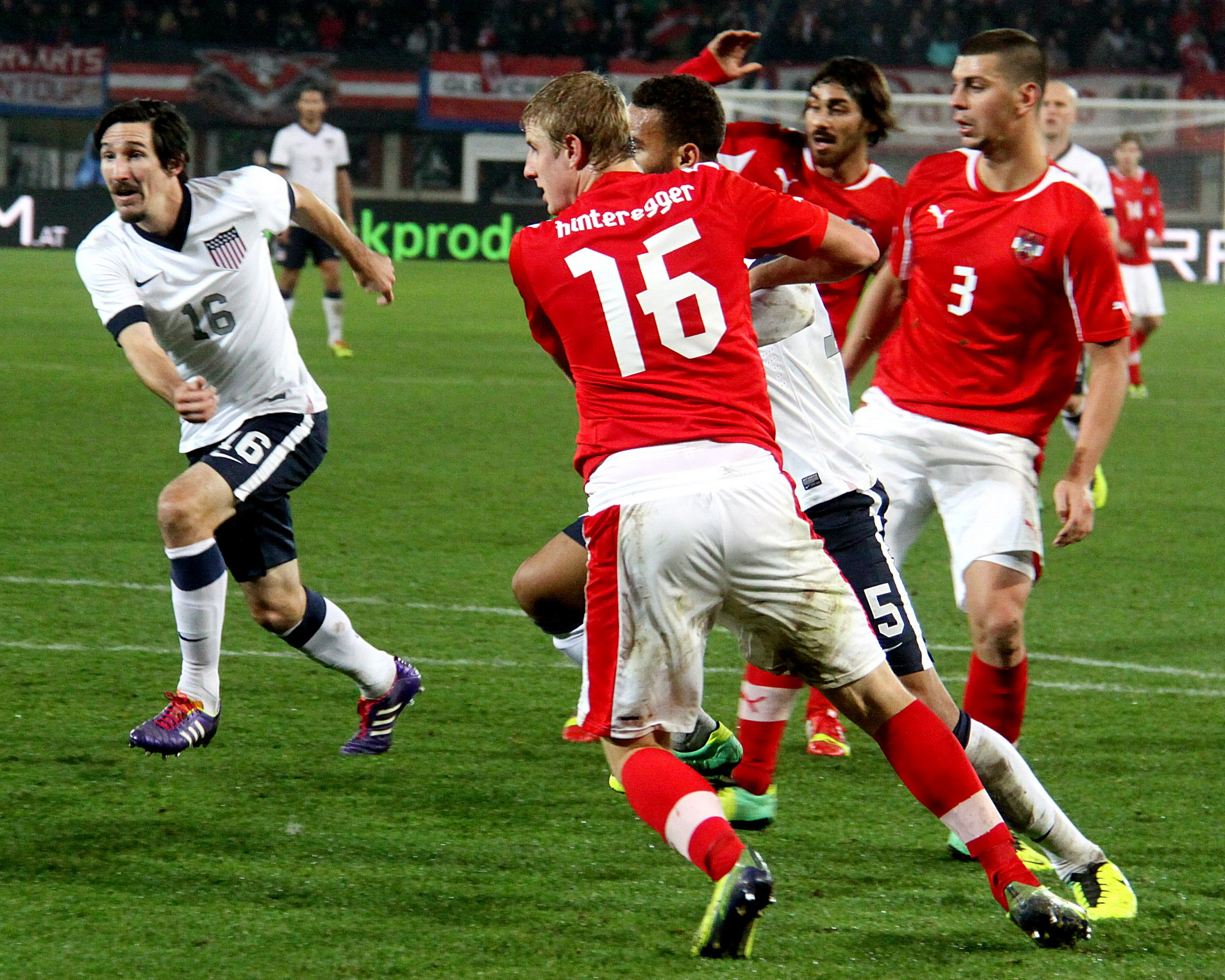
Kljestan (left) playing for the United States against Austria in 2013

In August 2016, Kljestan received his first call-up in over two years for the United States' 2018 FIFA World Cup qualifying matches against Saint Vincent and the Grenadines and Trinidad and Tobago. On September 2, Kljestan appeared as a second-half substitute and provided one goal and two assists in a 6–0 victory over St. Vincent and the Grenadines. In the following match on September 6, Kljestan scored his second goal of the qualifiers against Trinidad and Tobago helping the United States win their group and qualify for the Hex.

== Personal life ==
His brother Gordon once played an Open Cup match for the New York Red Bulls and also played for the Tampa Bay Rowdies in USSF Division 2. Kljestan's father Slavko Klještan, a Bosnian Serb from Sarajevo, Bosnia and Herzegovina, was a professional player playing for Željezničar Sarajevo.

Kljestan, along with Frank Lampard and Cuauhtémoc Blanco, was featured on the North American cover of FIFA 10.

Kljestan married model Jamie Lee Darley in June 2012.

== Career statistics ==
=== Club ===
Appearances and goals by club, season and competition
Club	Season	League			National cup (Note: Includes U.S. Open Cup and Belgian Cup)		League cup (Note: Includes MLS Cup playoffs and Belgian Super Cup)		Continental (Note: Includes CONCACAF Champions League, UEFA Europa League, and UEFA Champions League)		Total	
Club	Season	Division	Apps	Goals	Apps	Goals	Apps	Goals	Apps	Goals	Apps	Goals
Chivas USA	2006	MLS	32	0	1	0	2	0	–		35	0
Chivas USA	2007	MLS	25	4	1	0	2	0	–		28	4
Chivas USA	2008	MLS	22	5	1	0	2	1	2	0	27	6
Chivas USA	2009	MLS	25	5	0	0	2	0	–		27	5
Chivas USA	2010	MLS	10	1	0	0	–		–		10	1
Chivas USA	Total		114	15	3	0	8	1	2	0	127	16
Anderlecht	2010–11	Belgian Pro League	25	2	2	0	1	0	6	1	34	3
Anderlecht	2011–12	Belgian Pro League	36	4	0	0	0	0	10	1	46	5
Anderlecht	2012–13	Belgian Pro League	35	3	4	0	1	0	9	1	49	4
Anderlecht	2013–14	Belgian Pro League	23	8	1	0	1	0	5	1	30	9
Anderlecht	2014–15	Belgian Pro League	13	1	4	3	0	0	4	0	21	4
Anderlecht	Total		132	18	11	3	3	0	34	4	180	25
New York Red Bulls	2015	MLS	33	8	3	1	4	0	–		40	9
New York Red Bulls	2016	MLS	32	6	2	1	2	0	3	2	39	9
New York Red Bulls	2017	MLS	32	2	5	1	3	1	2	0	42	4
New York Red Bulls	Total		97	16	10	3	9	1	5	2	121	22
Orlando City	2018	MLS	30	6	3	0	–		–		33	6
Orlando City	2019	MLS	23	1	4	2	0	0	–		27	3
Orlando City	Total		53	7	7	2	0	0	0	0	60	9
LA Galaxy	2020	MLS	15 (Note: Includes two appearances in MLS is Back Tournament group stage)	0	–		–		–		15	0
LA Galaxy	2021	MLS	31	5	–		–		–		31	5
LA Galaxy	2022	MLS	21	1	2	0	0	0	–		23	1
LA Galaxy	Total		67	6	2	0	0	0	0	0	69	6
Des Moines Menace	2024	USL2 (Note: Kljestan was not part of the regular season roster)	–		2	0	–		–		2	0
Des Moines Menace	2025	USL2	–		2	2	–		–		2	2
Des Moines Menace	Total		0	0	4	2	0	0	0	0	4	2
Career total			452	62	37	10	20	2	41	6	561	80

=== International ===
Appearances and goals by national team and year
National team	Year	Apps	Goals
United States	2007	4	0
United States	2008	8	0
United States	2009	9	3
United States	2010	4	1
United States	2011	9	0
United States	2012	4	0
United States	2013	7	0
United States	2014	1	0
United States	2015	0	0
United States	2016	5	2
United States	2017	1	0
Total		52	6

Scores and results list the United States' goal tally first, score column indicates score after each Kljestan goal.

List of international goals scored by Sacha Kljestan
No.	Date	Venue	Opponent	Score	Result	Competition
1	January 24, 2009	Home Depot Center, Carson, United States	Sweden	1–0	3–2	Friendly
2	January 24, 2009	Home Depot Center, Carson, United States	Sweden	2–0	3–2	Friendly
3	January 24, 2009	Home Depot Center, Carson, United States	Sweden	3–1	3–2	Friendly
4	February 24, 2010	Raymond James Stadium, Tampa, United States	El Salvador	2–1	2–1	Friendly
5	September 2, 2016	Arnos Vale Stadium, Kingstown, Saint Vincent and the Grenadines	Saint Vincent and the Grenadines	5–0	6–0	2018 FIFA World Cup qualification
6	September 6, 2016	EverBank Field, Jacksonville, United States	Trinidad and Tobago	1–0	4–0	2018 FIFA World Cup qualification

== Honors ==
Anderlecht

- Belgian Pro League: 2011–12, 2012–13, 2013–14
- Belgian Super Cup: 2010, 2012, 2013, 2014
- Belgian Cup runner-up: 2014–15
- Jules Pappaert Cup: 2011

New York Red Bulls

- Supporters' Shield: 2015

United States

- FIFA Confederations Cup runner-up: 2009

Individual

- MLS Best XI: 2008, 2016
- MLS All-Star: 2016
- MLS top assist provider: 2016, 2017

== Notes ==
Sporting positions
Preceded by Jesse Marsch	Chivas USA captain 2010; Served alongside: Jonathan Bornstein	Succeeded by Simon Elliott
Preceded by Dax McCarty	New York Red Bulls captain 2017	Succeeded by Luis Robles
