= Eric Ebert =

American soccer player

Personal information
- Full name: Eric Ebert
- Date of birth: August 27, 1984 (age 42)
- Place of birth: Irvine, California, United States
- Height: 6 ft 0 in (1.83 m)
- Position: Midfielder

Youth career
- 1995–2003: Irvine Strikers
- 2003–2006: University of California, Berkeley

Senior career*
| Years | Team | Apps | (Gls) |
| 2006 | Orange County Blue Star | 11 | (1) |
| 2007 | Houston Dynamo | 0 | (0) |
| 2008 | Chivas USA | 7 | (0) |
- * Club domestic league appearances and goals as of April 2, 2009

Eric Ebert (born August 27, 1984) is an American soccer player who last played for Chivas USA. He is the son of Don Ebert, who played professional soccer for the New York Cosmos (NASL), St. Louis Steamers (MISL) and Los Angeles Lazers (MISL), and was the captain of the 1980 U.S. Olympic team.

Ebert was a three-time All-Sea View selection, a two-time all-CIF pick, and was named Irvine World News "Athlete of the Year" in 2003 while playing for Woodbridge High School in Irvine, California, prior to attending the University of California, Berkeley. Ebert appeared in over 70 games for the Golden Bears, earning all-Pac-10 honors multiple years. During his college years Ebert also played for Orange County Blue Star in the USL Premier Development League.

Ebert was the last draft pick - 52nd overall - of the 2007 MLS SuperDraft, by Houston Dynamo, but never appeared for Dynamo's first team. He was transferred to CD Chivas USA prior to the beginning of the 2008 season, and made his MLS debut in Chivas's home opener against Real Salt Lake on 5 April 2008.
