= Ricardo Salazar =

American soccer referee

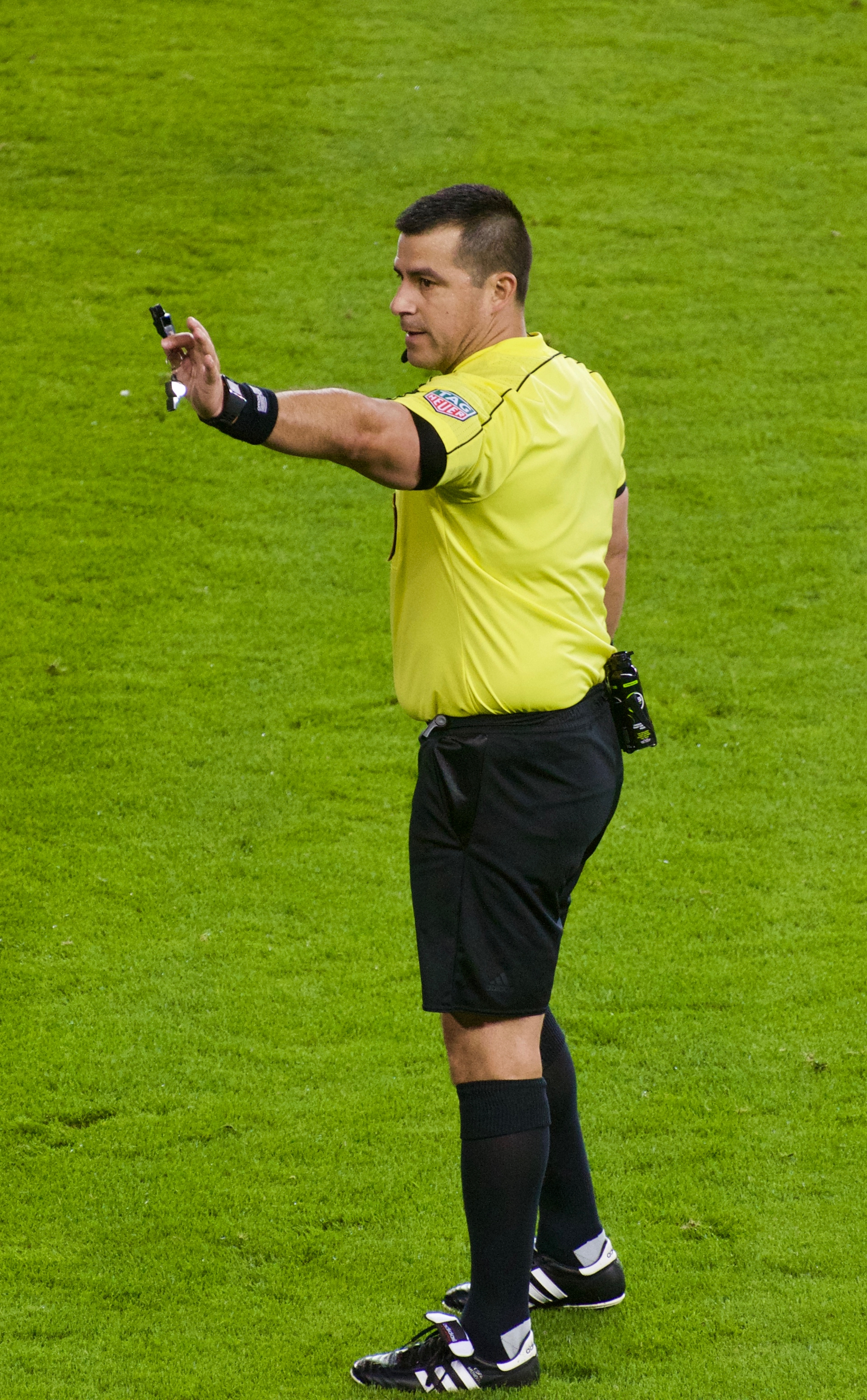
- Born: September 6, 1972 (age 54); Bakersfield, California, U.S.
- Other occupation: Insurance agent

Domestic
Years	League	Role
2000–2017	MLS	Referee
2007–2015	CONCACAF Champions League	Referee
2018-2021	MLS	VAR

International
Years	League	Role
2005–2015	FIFA	Referee

Ricardo Salazar (born September 6, 1972) is a referee who currently referees for the Professional Referee Organization and international matches. He became a full-time referee in 2007.

== MLS ==
Since becoming a fully professional referee in 2007, Salazar has officiated many matches in Major League Soccer. He has also officiated many important CONCACAF Champions Cup matches, including the CONCACAF Champions Cup Semi Final between Pachuca CF and CD Motagua.

Salazar was also one of the referees picked to officiate in the 2009 Pan-Pacific Championship.

On June 19, 2011, Salazar refereed an MLS match between the New York Red Bulls and Portland Timbers, in which he issued a yellow card to Adam Moffat and a red to Red Bulls star Thierry Henry after an altercation. Later that year, Salazar worked the 2011 MLS Cup Final.

Salazar officiated the 2012 Lamar Hunt U.S. Open Cup Final between Sporting Kansas City and Seattle Sounders FC. He handed out six yellow cards, all six to the Sounders, who went on to lose the game.r.

On March 17, 2013, Salazar refereed an MLS match between the LA Galaxy and Chivas USA. Chivas' Velázquez was originally shown his first yellow card of the match after a challenge on Galaxy midfielder Colin Clark. The player was then immediately shown a red card. The Professional Referees Organization (PRO) stated that the original caution card was shown by mistake and it was, in actuality, a red that was issued for the challenge. Chivas made a successful request to have the case reviewed by the independent panel and the card was overturned.

On June 1, 2013, Salazar refereed a match between Chivas USA and the Seattle Sounders FC. Late in the game, Salazar gave a straight red to Seattle's Obafemi Martins of in the 71st minute after a tussle with Chivas player Gabriel Farfan. MLS rescinded the card.

Salazar was a FIFA referee for ten years, and continued doing Major League Soccer matches until 2017. He transitioned to working as a VAR in the league until 2021.

== International ==
Since becoming a FIFA referee in 2005, Salazar had been chosen to officiate six international matches, four of which have been International Friendlies. On May 24, 2010 he officiated a friendly between Australia and New Zealand at the Melbourne Cricket Ground.

International matches officiated

Date	Home	Away	Result	Competition
October 15, 2008	Costa Rica	Haiti	2–0	2010 FIFA World Cup qualification – CONCACAF
May 27, 2009	Ecuador	El Salvador	1–3	Friendly match
October 14, 2009	El Salvador	Honduras	0–1	2010 FIFA World Cup qualification – CONCACAF
May 10, 2010	Mexico	Senegal	1–0	Friendly match
May 24, 2010	Australia	New Zealand	2–1	Friendly match
February 29, 2012	Estonia	El Salvador	2–0	Friendly match
May 29, 2013	Ecuador	Germany	2–4	Friendly match
June 7, 2014	England	Honduras	0–0	Friendly match
September 8, 2015	Argentina	Mexico	2–0	Friendly match

== Card statistics ==
Major League Soccer
Season	G	(yellow card) Tot	(yellow card) PG	(red card) Tot	(red card) PG
2013	21	60	2.86	6	0.29
2014	14	46	3.29	5	0.36
2015	18	44	2.44	4	0.22
2016	15	40	2.67	7	0.47

Updated to matches played on February 10, 2017.
Source: http://www.proreferees.com/stats-referee-stats.php
