= Chivas USA =

Defunct American soccer club

- Full name: Club Deportivo Chivas USA
- Nicknames: The Goats, Los Rojiblancos (The Red-and-White)
- Founded: August 2, 2004; 22 years ago
- Dissolved: October 27, 2014; 12 years ago
- Stadium: StubHub Center; Carson, California
- Capacity: 27,000 (2005–11); 18,800 (2011–12)
- League: Major League Soccer
Home colors	Away colors

Chivas USA (pronounced CHEE-vahs) was an American professional soccer club based in the Greater Los Angeles area. The club competed in Major League Soccer (MLS) as a member of the Western Conference. The team played from 2005 to 2014. It was a subsidiary of Mexican club C.D. Guadalajara, sharing common ownership and branding. The team played its home games at StubHub Center in Carson, California.

The club was the eleventh MLS team upon its entry into the league in 2004. Chivas USA was intended to be seen as a "little brother" to its parent club C.D. Guadalajara, one of the most widely supported and successful teams in Mexico. Chiva is Latin American Spanish for "goat", seen as a tough and resilient animal in Mexico, and is the nickname of C.D. Guadalajara.

The club was originally owned by Antonio Cue and Jorge Vergara, who also owned C.D. Guadalajara. In 2014, MLS purchased the club from Vergara with plans to sell to new owners.

The club ceased operations after the 2014 regular season and played their final match on October 26, 2014. That same year, MLS awarded a new expansion team in the Los Angeles area under a new ownership group. They began play as Los Angeles FC in 2018.

== History ==
=== Founding ===
Mexican businessman Jorge Vergara took ownership of the struggling Chivas de Guadalajara in 2002 and sought to use the rejuvenated club to establish an international brand. In June 2003, the league announced that the 2003 MLS All-Star Game would be played against Chivas and that Vergara was interested in purchasing an expansion team. The team, named "Chivas USA", would be affiliated with Chivas and play in either Los Angeles or San Diego beginning in the 2005 season; a bid from Houston was also considered. On August 2, 2004, Major League Soccer announced that Chivas USA would share The Home Depot Center in Carson with the Galaxy, and begin play in 2005 as the league's eleventh team.

=== Club struggles (2010–2013) ===
Martín Vásquez was named the team's head coach after serving as an assistant coach from 2005 to 2007. Sacha Kljestan and Jonathan Bornstein were named co-captains for the 2010 season. During the World Cup break Kljestan signed a deal with Belgian club Anderlecht, leaving Chivas USA after parts of five seasons. Bornstein played in the 2010 FIFA World Cup, starting in two matches for the United States as they made it to the Round of 16. On October 27, the team released Vásquez from his contract. On November 2, president and CEO Shawn Hunter announced he was stepping down. On December 14 the club's vice president of soccer operations, Stephen Hamilton revealed he too, was leaving his post. After Hamilton stepped down, Jose L Domene was named Interim General Manager. On January 4, 2011, Robin Fraser became head coach of Chivas USA.

On August 29, 2012, Vergara and his wife, Angélica Fuentes, became sole owners of the club, buying out former partners Antonio and Lorenzo Cué. On May 29, 2013, two Chivas USA youth coaches, Dan Calichman and Ted Chronopoulos, filed a discrimination lawsuit against the club, on the grounds they had been dismissed because they were not Latino. Shortly after the acquisition of the club, Vergara is alleged to have told his staff that those who did not speak Spanish would be fired. Chronopoulos claimed that Jose David, the team's new president and chief business officer, asked Chronopoulos for a list of youth players and coaches who were Mexican or Mexican American and of those that weren't.

Following the release of Preki, Chivas USA failed to stay consistent on and off the field, just like its parent club, CD Guadalajara, Chivas USA had four coaches after the start of the 2010 season; all four coaches failed to impress Jorge Vergara, and were let go. Their last coach was Colombian-born Wílmer Cabrera.

=== Final season (2014) ===
On February 20, 2014, Major League Soccer purchased Chivas USA from Vergara. They announced plans to sell to a buyer dedicated to keeping the club in Los Angeles, as well as a plan to rebrand the club in time for the 2015 MLS season. However, by September 29, 2014 ESPN reported that the club would suspend operations at the end of the MLS regular season, according to multiple sources.

On September 30, 2014, Grant Wahl of Sports Illustrated reported that a group of investors headed by Henry Nguyen, Los Angeles Dodgers investor Peter Guber and Cardiff City owner Vincent Tan agreed to purchase the club for a fee of over $100 million. The sale would mean that Chivas USA would fold completely, with the second Los Angeles team to take the field as a new expansion team with a new stadium in Downtown Los Angeles.

Chivas USA ceased operations on October 27, 2014, with its player development academy continuing to be operated by MLS until June 2015.

== Colors and badge ==
In January 2014, the team applied for the trademarks "Los Angeles SC" and "Los Angeles F.C." with logos for both. The filings were leaked prior to the MLS buyout of Chivas USA the following month.

== Stadium ==
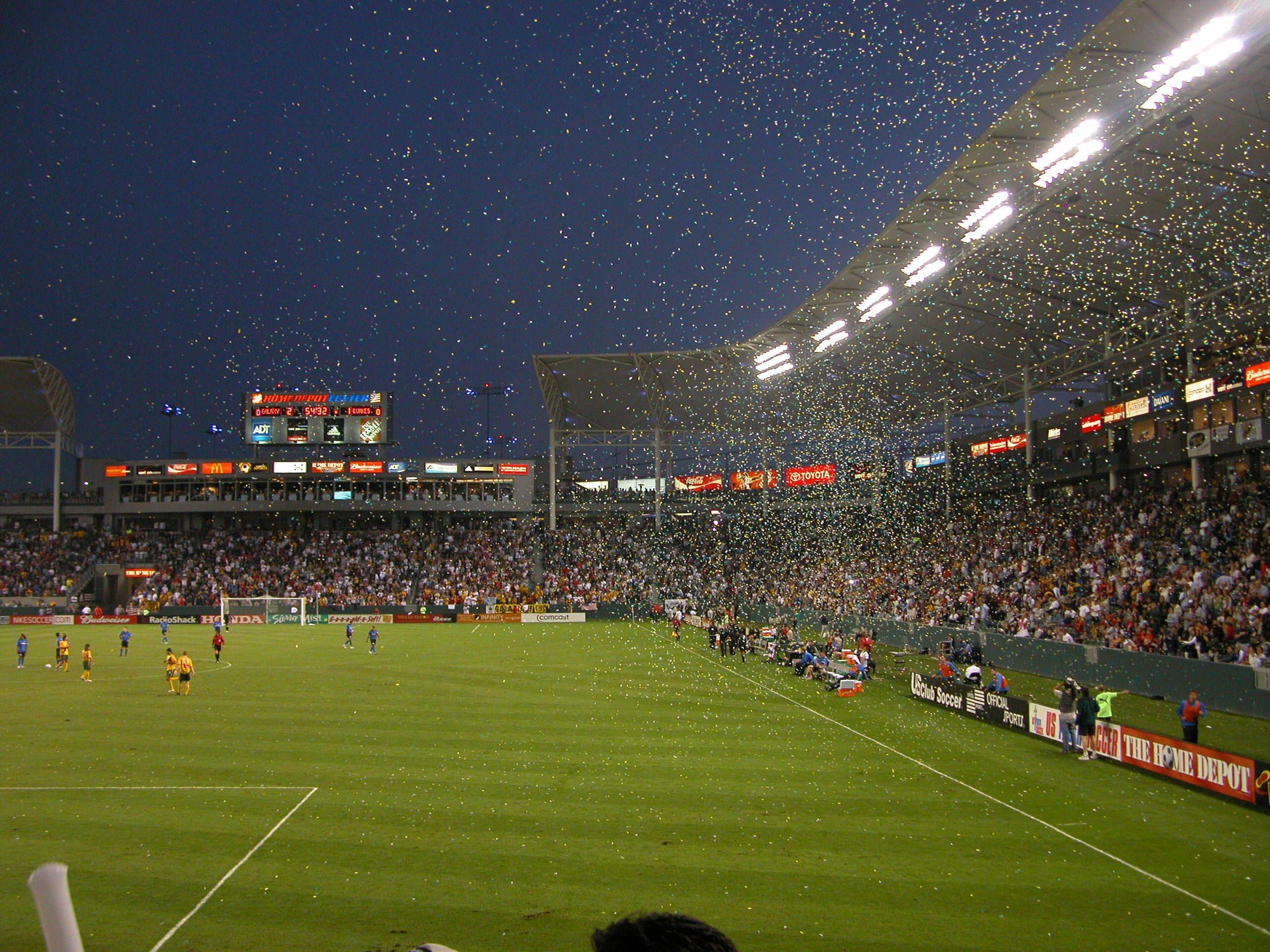
StubHub Center, Chivas USA's home stadium

- StubHub Center; Carson, California (2005–2014)
- Harder Stadium; Santa Barbara, California (2006) 1 game in U.S. Open Cup
- Titan Stadium; Fullerton, California (2008, 2010) 2 games in U.S. Open Cup and North American SuperLiga

== Sponsorship ==
On May 16, 2007, Comex, Mexico's leading paint company, became Chivas USA's first presenting sponsor, with their name on the front of the jerseys. At the opening of the 2010 season, the team's jerseys were blank. On April 1, 2010, the new presenting sponsor, Extra, was finally unveiled prior to the match against rivals LA Galaxy; Extra is a Mexican convenience store chain owned by Grupo Modelo, the makers of Corona beer. The chain's logo appeared on the front of Chivas USA jerseys and training jerseys for the rest of that year. On February 16, 2011 Corona became the presenting sponsor for Chivas USA.

== Broadcasting ==
For the 2014 season, Chivas USA non nationally televised matches were televised by KDOC in English and Time Warner Cable Deportes in Spanish. KDOC agreed to televise 10 matches while Time Warner Cable Deportes agreed to televise 16 matches. Matches not televised in Spanish on Time Warner Cable Deportes aired on the Univision family of networks (UniMas, Galavision, Univision Deportes Network).

Until 2012, FS West/Prime Ticket and KDOC televised all Chivas USA matches that were not nationally televised. In 2013, Chivas began the year with no local television partner; however, in August a deal was reached with KDOC (English) and MundoFOX22 KWHY-TV (Spanish) for the remainder of the 2013 season.

== Players and staff ==
=== Notable former players ===
Footballers who received international caps while playing for Chivas.

- (Canada) Ante Jazić (2009–12)
- (Canada) Chris Pozniak (2008)
- (Costa Rica) Darío Delgado (2010)
- (Costa Rica) Douglas Sequeira (2005)
- (Costa Rica) Michael Umaña (2010–11)
- (Ecuador) Oswaldo Minda (2012–14)
- (El Salvador) Steve Purdy (2013)
- (El Salvador) Osael Romero (2010)
- (Honduras) Marvin Chávez (2014)
- (Honduras) Amado Guevara (2007–08)
- (Honduras) Ramón Núñez (2007)
- (Jamaica) Shavar Thomas (2007–09)
- (Mexico) Juan Pablo García (2005–06)
- (Mexico) Erick Torres (2013–14)
- (Mexico) Francisco Palencia (2005–06)
- (Mexico) Ramón Ramírez (2005–07)
- (Mexico) Claudio Suárez (2006–09)
- (New Zealand) Andrew Boyens (2011)
- (New Zealand) Simon Elliott (2011)
- (New Zealand) Tony Lochhead (2014)
- (Saint Kitts and Nevis) Atiba Harris (2008–09)
- (Saint Vincent and the Grenadines) Ezra Hendrickson (2005)
- (Switzerland) Raphaël Wicky (2008)
- (United States) Juan Agudelo (2012–13)
- (United States) Jonathan Bornstein (2006–10)
- (United States) Brad Guzan (2005–08)
- (United States) Sacha Kljestan (2006–10)
- (United States) Jesse Marsch (2006–09)
- (United States) John O'Brien (2006)
- (United States) Heath Pearce (2011–12)
- (United States) Ante Razov (2006–09)
- (Venezuela) Giancarlo Maldonado (2010)
- (Venezuela) Alejandro Moreno (2011–12)

- See also All-time Chivas USA roster

== Record ==
=== Year-by-year ===
This is a partial list of the last five seasons completed by Chivas. For the full season-by-season history, see List of Chivas USA seasons.

Season	League											Position		Playoffs	USOC	Continental / Other		Average attendance	Top goalscorer(s)	
Season	Div	League	Pld	W	L	D	GF	GA	GD	Pts	PPG	Conf.	Overall	Playoffs	USOC	Continental / Other		Average attendance	Name(s)	Goals
2010	1	MLS	30	8	18	4	31	45	−14	28	0.93	8th	15th	DNQ	SF	North American SuperLiga	GS	14,576	(United States) Justin Braun	11
2011	1	MLS	34	8	14	12	41	43	−2	36	1.06	8th	15th	DNQ	QR1	DNQ		14,830	(United States) Justin Braun (United States) Nick LaBrocca	8
2012	1	MLS	34	7	18	9	24	58	−34	30	0.88	9th	18th	DNQ	SF	DNQ		13,056	(Colombia) Juan Pablo Ángel	5
2013	1	MLS	34	6	20	8	30	67	−37	26	0.76	9th	18th	DNQ	R4	DNQ		8,366	(Mexico) Erick Torres Padilla	7
2014	1	MLS	34	9	19	6	29	61	−32	33	0.97	7th	16th	DNQ	R4	DNQ		7,064	(Mexico) Erick Torres Padilla	15

1. Avg. attendance include statistics from league matches only.
2. Top goalscorer(s) includes all goals scored in League, MLS Cup Playoffs, U.S. Open Cup, CONCACAF Champions League, FIFA Club World Cup, and other competitive continental matches.

=== International tournaments ===
- 2008 North American SuperLiga

Group Stage v. (Mexico) Pachuca – 1:2
Group Stage v. (Mexico) Santos Laguna – 1:0
Group Stage v. (United States) New England Revolution – 1:1

- 2008–09 CONCACAF Champions League

Preliminary Round v. (Panama) Tauro – 1:3 aggregate over 2 legs

- 2009 North American SuperLiga

Group Stage v. (Mexico) UANL – 1:2
Group Stage v. (United States) Chicago Fire – 0:1
Group Stage v. (Mexico) San Luis – 1:1

- 2010 North American SuperLiga

Group Stage v. (Mexico) Puebla – 1:2
Group Stage v. (United States) Houston Dynamo – 1:1
Group Stage v. (Mexico) Pachuca – 1:0

=== Team records ===
- Goals: Ante Razov (30)
- Most Goals in a season: Erick Torres (15)
- Most consecutive league matches scored in: Erick Torres six matches (six goals)
- Assists: Sacha Kljestan (33)
- Most Assists in a season: Sacha Kljestan (13)
- Games Played: Dan Kennedy (144)
- Minutes Played: Dan Kennedy (12764)
- Shots: Ante Razov (234)
- Shots on Goal: Ante Razov (100)
- Game-Winning Goals: Ante Razov (10)
- Penalty Kick Goals: Erick Torres (6)
- Multi-Goal Games: Ante Razov (5)
- Saves: Dan Kennedy (451)
- Shutouts: Dan Kennedy (28)

MLS regular season only, through 2014 season

- All-Time regular season record: 92–149–79 (Through October 27, 2014)

== See also ==
- C.D. Guadalajara – club with which this club was affiliated
- Jorge Vergara
